= List of Please Take Care of My Refrigerator episodes =

This is a list of episodes of the South Korean variety-cooking show Please Take Care of My Refrigerator. The show aired on JTBC every Monday at 21:30 (KST) from November 17, 2014 to November 25, 2019. The show was rebooted on both television and on Netflix, the first episode aired on December 15, 2024.

== Statistics ==
- Horizontally: Win – Lose
- Vertically: Lose – Win
- X = no match

=== Season 1 (2014–2016) ===
Statistic in Season 1

Chefs\Competitors	LYB	SK	CHS	MA	KP	HSC	LWI	OSD	JCW	JHY	LCO	PJW	MGY	Total wins	Total Losses	Final Rank	Notes
Lee Yeon-bok; LYB	(none)	5–3	3–2	3–1	6–1	2–0	2–0	2–1	0–1	3–2	1–0	X	X	29	12	1	+WWL (Note: Lee Yeon-bok won once against Han Sang-hoon and Choi Hyung-jin; lost once against Yeo Kyung-rae.)
Sam Kim; SK	3–5	(none)	5–5	5–4	3–6	0–2	2–1	2–2	3–0	2–1	1–0	0–1	X	28	28	2	+WWL (Note: Sam Kim won once against Yoo Chang-joon; won once and lost once against Raymon Kim.)
Choi Hyun-seok; CHS	2–3	5–5	(none)	3–4	5–1	2–3	0–3	2–3	1–2	1–1	2–1	2–0	X	26	28	3	+WLL (Note: Choi Hyun-seok won once against Lee Jae-hoon; lost once against Motokawa Atsushi and Baek Seung-wook.)
Mihal Ashminov; MA	1–3	4–5	4–3	(none)	4–3	2–4	1–0	4–1	0–2	2–0	2–3	1–1	X	25	26	4	+L (Note: Mihal Ashminov lost once against Park Ri-hye.)
Kim Poong; KP	1–6	6–3	1–5	3–4	(none)	1–2	1–4	2–3	0–2	2–2	2–2	1–1	0–1	21	36	5	+WL (Note: Kim Poong won once against Kim Min-jun; lost once against Lee Sang-min.)
Hong Seok-cheon; HSC	0–2	2–0	3–2	4–2	2–1	(none)	0–2	1–0	3–2	2–0	1–0	1–1	X	19	12	6	
Lee Won-il; LWI	0–2	1–2	3–0	0–1	4–1	2–0	(none)	1–2	0–1	0–2	2–0	2–1	1–0	16	12	7	
Oh Se-deuk; OSD	1–2	2–2	3–2	1–4	3–2	0–1	2–1	(none)	0–1	2–2	0–2	X	X	14	19	8	
Jung Chang-wook; JCW	1–0	0–3	2–1	2–0	2–0	2–3	1–0	1–0	(none)	X	X	1–0	X	12	7	9	
Jung Ho-young; JHY	2–3	1–2	1–1	0–2	2–2	0–2	2–0	2–2	X	(none)	1–0	X	X	11	14	10	
Lee Chan-oh; LCO	0–1	0–1	1–2	3–2	2–2	0–1	0–2	2–0	X	0–1	(none)	1–0	X	9	12	11	
Park Joon-woo; PJW	X	1–0	0–2	1–1	1–1	1–1	1–2	X	0–1	X	0–1	(none)	0–1	5	10	12	
Maeng Gi-yong; MGY	X	X	X	X	1–0	X	0–1	X	X	X	X	1–0	(none)	2	1	13	

=== Season 2 (2017) ===
Statistic in Season 2

Chefs\Competitors	MA	CHS	JBA	JHY	KP	RK	SK	LJH	LWI	LYB	OSD	PGY	YHS	Wins	Losses	Final Rank	Notes
Lee Yeon-bok; LYB	3–0	X	1–0	2–0	2–2	2–2	3–1	0–1	0–1	(none)	X	X	1–2	14 (56.00%)	11	1 (Note: First six ranks were decided by the championship matches' result.)	+LL (Note: Lee Yeon-bok lost once (teamed with Raymon Kim) against Jung Ho-young & Yoo Hyun-soo's team in 3rd Anniversary Special's match; lost once against special chef Gordon Ramsay.)
Raymon Kim; RK	X	1–0	X	2–0	5–0	(none)	2–0	0–1	X	2–2	1–0	X	1–2	14 (70.00%)	6	2	+L (Note: Raymon Kim lost once (teamed with Lee Yeon-bok) against Jung Ho-young & Yoo Hyun-soo's team in 3rd Anniversary Special's match.)
Jung Ho-young; JHY	1–1	X	X	(none)	2–1	0–2	2–1	1–0	X	0–2	1–1	0–1	3–1	12 (54.55%)	10	3	+WW (Note: Jung Ho-young teamed with Yoo Hyun-soo, won once against Lee Yeon-bok & Raymon Kim's team and won once against Sam Kim & Mihal Ashminov's team in 3rd Anniversary Special's match.)
Yoo Hyun-soo; YHS	0–1	0–1	X	1–3	2–1	2–1	0–1	1–1	1–0	2–1	0–3	X	(none)	11 (45.83%)	13	4	+WW (Note: Yoo Hyun-soo teamed with Jung Ho-young, won once against Lee Yeon-bok & Raymon Kim's team and won once against Sam Kim & Mihal Ashminov's team in 3rd Anniversary Special's match.)
Sam Kim; SK	3–0	1–0	X	1–2	1–1	0–2	(none)	1–3	1–1	1–3	0–1	X	1–0	11 (44.00%)	14	5	+WL (Note: Sam Kim teamed with Mihal Ashminov, won once against Kim Poong & Oh Se-deuk's team and lost once against Jung Ho-young & Yoo Hyun-soo's team in 3rd Anniversary Special's match.)
Kim Poong; KP	1–0	0–1	X	1–2	(none)	0–5	1–1	1–1	1–0	2–2	0–1	X	1–2	9 (36.00%)	16	6	+WL (Note: Kim Poong won once against Kim Min-jun; lost once (teamed with Oh Se-deuk) against Sam Kim & Mihal Ashminov's team in 3rd Anniversary Special's match.)
Lee Jae-hoon; LJH	1–1	0–1	X	0–1	1–1	1–0	3–1	(none)	X	1–0	X	X	1–1	8 (57.14%)	6	7	
Oh Se-deuk; OSD	0–1	1–0	X	1–1	1–0	0–1	1–0	X	X	X	(none)	X	3–0	7 (63.64%)	4	8	+L (Note: Oh Se-deuk lost once (teamed with Kim Poong) against Sam Kim & Mihal Ashminov's team in 3rd Anniversary Special's match.)
Mihal Ashminov; MA	(none)	1–0	X	1–1	0–1	X	0–3	1–1	1–0	0–3	1–0	X	1–0	7 (41.18%)	10	9	+WL (Note: Mihal Ashminov teamed with Sam Kim, won once against Kim Poong & Oh Se-deuk's team and lost once against Jung Ho-young & Yoo Hyun-soo's team in 3rd Anniversary Special's match.)
Lee Won-il; LWI	0–1	X	X	X	0–1	X	1–1	X	(none)	1–0	X	X	0–1	2 (33.33%)	4	10	
Choi Hyun-seok; CHS	0–1	(none)	X	X	1–0	0–1	0–1	1–0	X	X	0–1	X	1–0	3 (42.86%)	4	NR	
Joo Bae-an; JBA	X	X	(none)	X	X	X	X	X	X	0–1	X	1–0	X	1 (50.00%)	1	NR	
Park Geon-young; PGY	X	X	0–1	1–0	X	X	X	X	X	X	X	(none)	X	1 (50.00%)	1	NR	

=== Season 3 (2018) ===
Statistic in Season 3

Chefs\Competitors	MA	JHY	JJS	TJ	KHS	KP	RK	SK	LYB	OSD	YHS	Wins	Losses	Final Rank	Notes
Lee Yeon-bok; LYB	2–1	3–0	0–1	X	X	1–2	1–1	1–1	(none)	4–1	2–1	14 (58.33%)	10	1 (Note: First four ranks were decided by the championship matches' result.)	+LL (Note: Lee Yeon-bok teamed with Kim Poong and lost once against team of Motokawa Atsushi & Jung Ho-young in 2018 Yolympic match; Lee also lost once against the challenger, chef Choi Seok-yi, on episode 186.)
Kim Poong; KP	1–0	3–1	1–0	X	X	(none)	2–2	0–2	2–1	2–3	3–1	14 (56.00%)	11	2	+L (Note: Kim Poong teamed with Lee Yeon-bok and lost once against team of Motokawa Atsushi & Jung Ho-young in 2018 Yolympic match.)
Yoo Hyun-soo; YHS	3–0	0–1	1–0	0–1	X	1–3	1–1	4–2	1–2	0–2	(none)	13 (52.00%)	12	3	+WW (Note: Yoo Hyun-soo won once against Dubai chef Benjamin Wan in 2018 Yolympic match; Yoo also won once against North Korean chef Yun Jong Chŏl on episode 203.)
Sam Kim; SK	1–1	3–3	X	1–0	X	2–0	2–1	(none)	1–1	0–2	2–4	13 (52.00%)	12	4	+W (Note: Sam Kim won once against Italian chef Ciro Petrone in 2018 Yolympic match.)
Oh Se-deuk; OSD	2–1	0–1	X	X	X	3–2	1–1	2–0	1–4	(none)	2–0	11 (55.00%)	9	5	
Jung Ho-young; JHY	0–1	(none)	X	X	1–0	1–3	2–0	3–3	0–3	1–0	1–0	10 (50.00%)	10	6	+W (Note: Jung Ho-young teamed with Japanese chef Motokawa Atsushi won once against team of Lee Yeon-bok & Kim Poong in 2018 Yolympic match.)
Raymon Kim; RK	2–2	0–2	0–1	1–0	1–0	2–2	(none)	1–2	1–1	1–1	1–1	10 (43.48%)	13	7	+L (Note: Raymon Kim lost once against American chef Rupert Blease in 2018 Yolympic match.)
Mihal Ashminov; MA	(none)	1–0	X	X	X	0–1	2–2	1–1	1–2	1–2	0–3	6 (35.29%)	11	8	
Jung Ji-seon; JJS	X	X	(none)	X	X	0–1	1–0	X	1–0	X	0–1	2 (50.00%)	2	9	
Tony Jung; TJ	X	X	X	(none)	X	X	0–1	0–1	X	X	1–0	1 (25.00%)	3	10	
Kim Hyung-seok; KHS	X	0–1	X	X	(none)	X	0–1	X	X	X	X	0 (0.00%)	2	11	

=== Season 4 (2019) ===
Statistic in Season 4

Chefs\Competitors	MA	JHY	KP	RK	SK	KSM	LYB	OSD	SH	YHS	Wins	Losses	Final Rank
Raymon Kim; RK	X	2–1	1–2	(none)	3–1	X	3–3	0–1	3–0	2–0	14 (63.64%)	8	1
Sam Kim; SK	1–0	2–0	2–1	1–3	(none)	1–0	2–1	1–3	1–1	2–0	13 (59.09%)	9	2
Lee Yeon-bok; LYB	X	1–1	2–0	3–3	1–2	X	(none)	3–1	1–1	1–1	12 (57.14%)	9	3
Yoo Hyun-soo; YHS	1–0	3–2	1–2	0–2	0–2	1–0	1–1	4–0	0–2	(none)	11 (50.00%)	11	4
Oh Se-deuk; OSD	X	2–1	2–2	1–0	3–1	1–0	1–3	(none)	0–1	0–4	10 (45.45%)	12	5
Jung Ho-young; JHY	1–0	(none)	2–1	1–2	0–2	1–1	1–1	1–2	0–1	2–3	9 (40.91%)	13	6
Kim Poong; KP	X	1–2	(none)	2–1	1–2	0–1	0–2	2–2	1–2	2–1	9 (40.91%)	13	6
Song Hoon; SH	X	1–0	2–1	0–3	1–1	X	1–1	1–0	(none)	2–0	8 (57.14%)	6	8
Kim Seung-min; KSM	X	1–1	1–0	X	0–1	(none)	X	0–1	X	0–1	2 (33.33%)	4	9
Mihal Ashminov; MA	(none)	0–1	X	X	0–1	X	X	X	X	0–1	0 (0.00%)	3	10

=== Season 5 (2024–2025) ===
Statistic in Season 5

Chefs\Competitors	LYB	SK	CHS	KP	JHY	JJS	CKR	EL	KSJ	ITH	PEY	SJW	YNN	FF	Total wins	Total Losses	Final Rank	Notes
Choi Hyun-seok; CHS	X	2–2	(none)	2–1	1–0	0–1	0–1	1–0	2–0	X	3–0	2–1	1–0	0–1	16 (66.67%)	8	1 (Note: First five ranks were decided by the championship matches' result.)	+WLW (Note: Choi Hyun-seok won once against Bae Kyung-jun; lost once against Bae Kyung-jun; Choi won once against Han Li Guang.)
Park Eun-yeong; PEY	1–0	X	0–3	3–0	2–0	0–1	X	X	2–0	0–1	(none)	2–1	0–1	X	12 (63.16%)	7	2	+WW (Note: Park Eun-yeong teamed with Jung Ji-seon and won once against Kim Poong & Im Tae-hoon's team; Park won once against Yeo Kyung-rae)
Jung Ho-young; JHY	X	3–0	0–1	2–1	(none)	X	2–0	X	X	X	0–2	1–2	1–2	1–0	10 (55.56%)	8	3	
Kim Poong; KP	X	0–2	1–2	(none)	1–2	1–1	0–1	X	2–2	X	0–3	1–0	4–0	0–1	10 (37.04%)	17	4	+LLL (Note: Kim Poong lost once against Jang Keun-suk; Kim teamed with Im Tae-hoon and lost once against Jung Ji-seon & Park Eun-yeong's team; Kim teamed with Son Jong-won and lost once against Kwon Sung-jun & Yoon Nam-no's team)
Son Jong-won; SJW	0–1	2–1	1–2	0–1	2–1	0–1	X	X	2–0	X	1–2	(none)	1–0	X	9 (45.00%)	11	5	+LL (Note: Son Jong-won lost once against Takada Yusuke; Son teamed with Kim Poong and lost once against Kwon Sung-jun & Yoon Nam-no's team)
Yoon Nam-no; YNN	X	X	0–1	0–4	2–1	0–1	1–0	0–1	4–0	0–1	1–0	0–1	(none)	X	9 (45.00%)	11	6	+LW (Note: Yoon Nam-no lost once against Joseph Lidgerwood; Yoon teamed with Kwon Sung-jun and won once against Kim Poong & Son Jong-won's team)
Kwon Sung-jun; KSJ	1–0	1–1	0–2	2–2	X	X	1–0	1–0	(none)	X	0–2	0–2	0–4	0–1	8 (34.78%)	15	7	+WLW (Note: Kwon Sung-jun won once against Bae Kyung-jun; Kwon lost once against Antimo Maria Merone; Kwon teamed with Yoon Nam-no and won once against Kim Poong & Son Jong-won's team)
Jung Ji-seon; JJS	X	X	1–0	1–1	X	(none)	X	X	X	1–0	1–0	1–0	1–0	X	7 (87.50%)	1	8	+W (Note: Jung Ji-seon teamed with Park Eun-yeong and won once against Kim Poong & Im Tae-hoon's team)
Sam Kim; SK	X	(none)	2–2	2–0	0–3	X	X	X	1–1	X	X	1–2	X	1–0	7 (43.75%)	9	9	+L (Note: Sam Kim lost once against Antimo Maria Merone)
Lee Yeon-bok; LYB	(none)	X	X	X	X	X	1–0	X	0–1	X	0–1	1–0	X	X	3 (60.00%)	2	10	+W (Note: Lee Yeon-bok won once against Lee Mi-young.)
Fabrizio Ferrari; FF	X	0–1	1–0	1–0	0–1	X	X	X	1–0	X	X	X	X	(none)	3 (50.00%)	3	11	+L (Note: Fabrizio Ferrari lost once against Kim Sohyi.)
Im Tae-hoon; ITH	X	X	X	X	X	0–1	X	X	X	(none)	1–0	X	1–0	X	2 (40.00%)	3	12	+LL (Note: Im Tae-hoon lost once against Yeo Kyung-rae; Im teamed with Kim Poong and lost once against Jung Ji-seon & Park Eun-yeong's team)
Choi Kang-rok; CKR	0–1	X	1–0	1–0	0–2	X	(none)	X	0–1	X	X	X	0–1	X	2 (25.00%)	6	13	+L (Note: Choi Kang-rok lost once against Kim Sohyi.)
Edward Lee; EL	X	X	0–1	X	X	X	X	(none)	0–1	X	X	X	1–0	X	1 (33.33%)	2	14	

=== Season 6 (2026) ===
Statistic in Season 6

Chefs\Competitors	CHS	SK	JHY	KP	SJW	PEY	KSJ	YNN	LMJ	Total wins	Total Losses	Final Rank	Notes
Sam Kim; SK	2–1	(none)	2–2	0–2	0–3	1–0	2–0	1–0	X	9 (45.00%)	11		+LLLW (Note: Sam Kim teamed with Jung Ho-young and lost once against Choi Hyun-seok & Kim Poong's team; Kim teamed with Jung Ho-young and lost once against Kim Poong & Lee Moon-jung's team; Kim teamed up with Kim Poong and lost once against Park Eun-yeong and Son Jong-won's team; Kim won once against Edward Lee)
Son Jong-won; SJW	2–1	3–0	0–1	0–1	(none)	2–1	2–2	2–0	X	13 (61.90%)	8		+WLLW (Note: Son Jong-won won once against Park Eun-yeong, Kwon Sung-jun & Yoon Nam-no's team; Son teamed up with Woo Do-hee and lost once against Choi Hyun-seok and Kim Seon-yeop's team; Son lost once against Yoo Yong-wook; Son teamed up with Park Eun-yeong and won once against Kim Poong and Sam Kim's team)
Jung Ho-young; JHY	2–0	2–2	(none)	2–2	1–0	2–0	0–1	1–1	X	10 (52.63%)	9		+LLL (Note: Jung Ho-young lost once against Choi Kang-rok; Jung teamed with Sam Kim and lost once against Choi Hyun-seok and Kim Poong's team; Jung teamed with Sam Kim and lost once against Kim Poong & Lee Moon-jung's team)
Kim Poong; KP	0–1	2–0	2–2	(none)	1–0	1–2	0–1	1–1	0–1	10 (50.00%)	10		+WWLWL (Note: Kim Poong won once against Kim Si-hyeon; Kim teamed with Choi Hyun-seok and won once against Sam Kim & Jung Ho-young's team; Kim lost once against Yoo Yong-wook; Kim teamed with Lee Moon-jung and won once against Sam Kim & Jung Ho-young's team; Kim teamed up with Sam Kim and lost once against Park Eun-yeong and Son Jong-won's team)
Choi Hyun-seok; CHS	(none)	1–2	0–2	1–0	1–2	1–1	2–2	1–0	X	11 (55.00%)	9		+WWWW (Note: Choi Hyun-seok teamed with Kim Poong and won once against Sam Kim and Jung Ho-young's team; Choi teamed up with Kim Seon-yeop and won once against Son Jong-won and Woo Do-hee's team; Choi teamed up with Kwon Sung-jun and won once against Lee Moon-jung and Park Eun-yeong's team; Choi teamed with Yoon Nam-no and won once against Lee Moon-jung and Park Eun-yeong's team)
Kwon Sung-jun; KSJ	2–2	0–2	1–0	1–0	2–2	X	(none)	2–1	0–1	9 (50.00%)	9		+LW (Note: Kwon Sung-jun teamed with Park Eun-yeong & Yoon Nam-no and lost once against Son Jong-won; Kwon teamed up with Choi Hyun-seok and won once against Lee Moon-jung and Park Eun-yeong's team)
Park Eun-yeong; PEY	1–1	0–1	0–2	2–1	1–2	(none)	X	2–2	0–1	8 (38.10%)	13		+WLLLW (Note: Park Eun-yeong won once against Edward Lee; Park teamed with Kwon Sung-jun & Yoon Nam-no and lost once against Son Jong-won; Park teamed up with Lee Moon-jung and lost once against Choi Hyun-seok and Kwon Sung-jun's team; Park teamed with Lee Moon-jung and lost once against Choi Hyun-seok and Yoon Nam-no's team; Park teamed up with Son Jong-won and won once against Kim Poong and Sam Kim's team)
Yoon Nam-no; YNN	0–1	0–1	1–1	1–1	0–2	2–2	1–2	(none)	X	6 (35.29%)	11		+LW (Note: Yoon Nam-no teamed with Park Eun-yeong & Kwon Sung-jun and lost once against Son Jong-won; Yoon teamed with Choi Hyun-seok and won once against Lee Moon-jung and Park Eun-yeong's team)
Lee Moon-jung; LMJ	X	X	X	1–0	X	1–0	1–0	X	(none)	4 (66.67%)	2		+LWL (Note: Lee Moon-jung teamed with Park Eun-yeong and lost once against Choi Hyun-seok and Kwon Sung-jun's team; Lee teamed with Kim Poong and won once against Sam Kim & Jung Ho-young's team; Lee teamed with Park Eun-yeong and lost once against Choi Hyun-seok and Yoon Nam-no's team)

=== Season 1~4 unity ===
Statistic in Season 1~3 unity

Weekly update (current as of episode 195). Number with * can be changed; if not, it was fixed.

Chefs\Competitors	KP	KHS	RK	MGY	MA	PKY	PJW	SK	OSD	YHS	LYB	LWI	LJH	LCO	JJS	JCW	JHY	JBA	CSY	CHS	TJ	HSC	Wins	Losses	Temporary Rank	Notes
Kim Poong; KP	(none)	X	2–7	0–1	5–5	X	1–1	7–7	4–7	4–3	5–9	2–4	1–1	2–2	1–0	0–2	6–6	X	X	1–6	X	1–2	44 (41.12%)	63	3	
Kim Hyung-seok; KHS	X	(none)	0–1	X	X	X	X	X	X	X	X	X	X	X	X	X	0–1	X	X	X	X	X	0 (0.00%)	2	22	
Raymon Kim; RK	7–2	1–0	(none)	X	2–2	X	X	4–3	2–1	2–4	3–3	X	0–1	X	0–1	X	2–3	X	X	1–0	1–0	X	25 (55.56%)	20	7	
Maeng Gi-yong; MGY	1–0	X	X	(none)	X	X	1–0	X	X	X	X	0–1	X	X	X	X	X	X	X	X	X	X	2 (66.67%)	1	16	
Mihal Ashminov; MA	5–5	X	2–2	X	(none)	X	1–1	5–9	6–3	1–4	2–8	2–0	1–1	2–3	X	0–2	4–2	X	X	5–3	X	2–4	38 (44.71%)	47	4	
Park Geon-young; PGY	X	X	X	X	X	(none)	X	X	X	X	X	X	X	X	X	X	1-0	0-1	X	X	X	X	1 (50.00%)	1	18	
Park Joon-woo; PJW	1–1	X	X	0–1	1–1	X	(none)	1–0	X	X	X	1–2	X	0–1	X	0–1	X	X	X	0–2	X	1–1	5 (33.33%)	10	18	
Sam Kim; SK	7–7	X	3–4	X	9–5	X	0–1	(none)	3–5	3–5	5–9	3–2	1–3	1–0	X	3–0	6–7	X	X	6–5	1–0	0–2	52 (49.06%)	54	2	
Oh Se-deuk; OSD	7–4	X	1–2	X	3–6	X	X	5–3	(none)	5–0	2–6	2–1	X	0–2	X	0–1	3–4	X	X	4–2	X	0–1	32 (50.00%)	32	6	
Yoo Hyun-soo; YHS	3–4	X	4–2	X	4–1	X	X	5–3	0–5	(none)	4–3	1–0	1–1	X	1–0	X	1–4	X	X	0–1	0–1	X	24 (48.98%)	25	9	
Lee Yeon-bok; LYB	9–5	X	3–3	X	8–2	X	X	9–5	6–2	3–4	(none)	2–1	0–1	1–0	0–1	0–1	8–4	1–0	0–1	3–2	X	2–0	57 (63.33%)	33	1	
Lee Won-il; LWl	4–2	X	X	1–0	0–2	X	2–1	2–3	1–2	0–1	1–2	(none)	X	2–0	X	0–1	0–2	X	X	3–0	X	2–0	18 (75.00%)	16	11	
Lee Jae-hoon; LJH	1–1	X	1–0	X	1–1	X	X	3–1	X	1–1	1–0	X	(none)	X	X	X	0–1	X	X	0–2	X	X	8 (53.33%)	7	14	
Lee Chan-oh; LCO	2–2	X	X	X	3–2	X	1–0	0–1	2–0	X	0–1	0–2	X	(none)	X	X	0–1	X	X	1–2	X	0–1	9 (42.86%)	12	13	
Jung Ji-seon; JJS	0–1	X	1–0	X	X	X	X	X	X	0–1	1–0	X	X	X	(none)	X	X	X	X	X	X	X	2 (50.00%)	2	16	
Jung Chang-wook; JCK	2–0	X	X	X	2–0	X	1–0	0–3	1–0	X	1–0	1–0	X	X	X	(none)	X	X	X	2–1	X	2–3	12 (63.16%)	7	12	
Jung Ho-young; JHY	6–6	1–0	3–2	X	2–4	0–1	X	7–6	4–3	4–1	4–8	2–0	1–0	1–0	X	X	(none)	X	X	1–1	X	0–2	33 (49.25%)	34	6	
Joo Bae-an; JBA	X	X	X	X	X	1–0	X	X	X	X	0–1	X	X	X	X	X	X	(none)	X	X	X	X	1 (50.00%)	1	18	
Choi Seok-yi; CSY	X	X	X	X	X	X	X	X	X	X	1–0	X	X	X	X	X	X	X	(none)	X	X	X	1 (100.00%)	0	17	
Choi Hyun-seok; CHS	6–1	X	0–1	X	3–5	X	2–0	5–6	2–4	1–0	2–3	0–3	2–0	2–1	X	1–2	1–1	X	X	(none)	X	2–3	29 (47.54%)	32	7	
Tony Jung; TJ	X	X	0–1	X	X	X	X	0–1	X	1–0	X	X	X	X	X	X	X	X	X	X	(none)	X	1 (33.33%)	2	20	
Hong Seok-cheon; HSC	2–1	X	X	X	4–2	X	1–1	2–0	1–0	X	0–2	0–2	X	1–0	X	3–2	2–0	X	X	3–2	X	(none)	19 (61.29%)	12	10	

== List of episodes ==
(Winner chef's name is in bold)

=== 2014 ===
Episodes 1–7

Episodes 1, 2, 6, 7: Scores are the public votes by hosts, guests and chefs (except two main competitors of each match).

Episode #	Broadcast Date	Guests	Chefs' Cooking Matches		
1	November 17	Robin Deiana, Zhang Yu'an	Jung Chang-wook; **Choi Hyun-seok**; **Sam Kim**	3 — **5**; **5** — 2; **6** — 1	**Hong Seok-cheon**; Kim Poong; Mihal Ashminov
2	November 24	Ahn Jung-hwan, Lee Kyou-hyuk	Hong Seok-cheon; **Sam Kim**; Choi Hyun-seok	0 — **8**; **5** — 2; 1 — **6**	**Jung Chang-wook**; Kim Poong; **Mihal Ashminov**
3	December 1	Kangnam (M.I.B), Sayuri	**Jung Chang-wook**	—	Choi Hyun-seok
4	December 8	Kangnam (M.I.B), Sayuri	Sam Kim; **Hong Seok-cheon**	— —	**Kim Poong**; Mihal Ashminov
5	December 15	Shim Hyung-tak, Hong Jin-ho	Jung Chang-wook	—	**Sam Kim**
6	December 22	Shim Hyung-tak, Hong Jin-ho	**Mihal Ashminov**; **Hong Seok-cheon**	— **6** — 4	Choi Hyun-seok; Kim Poong
7	December 29	Jang Dong-min, Shin Bong-sun	Kim Poong; **Choi Hyun-seok**; **Hong Seok-cheon**	— — **6** — 4	**Jung Chang-wook**; Sam Kim; Mihal Ashminov

=== 2015 ===
Episodes 8–59

Episodes 9, 14: Scores are the public votes by hosts, guests and chefs (except two main competitors of each match). Episode 56: Score of each chef was given by Lee Seung-chul (based on 100 points), like in the music audition show where he was a judge.

Episode #	Broadcast Date	Guests	Chefs' Cooking Matches		
8	January 5	Han Hye-jin, Lee Hyun-yi	**Hong Seok-cheon**	—	Choi Hyun-seok
9	January 12	Han Hye-jin, Lee Hyun-yi	Sam Kim; **Jung Chang-wook**	— **5** — 5	**Kim Poong**; Mihal Ashminov
10	January 19	So Yoo-jin, Kahi	Park Joon-woo; **Hong Seok-cheon**	— —	**Choi Hyun-seok**; Sam Kim
11	January 26	So Yoo-jin, Kahi	**Mihal Ashminov**; **Jung Chang-wook**	— —	Kim Poong; Lee Won-il
12	February 2	Kim Min-jun, Heo Kyung-hwan	Hong Seok-cheon; **Sam Kim**	— —	**Lee Won-il**; Mihal Ashminov
13	February 9	Kim Min-jun, Heo Kyung-hwan	**Choi Hyun-seok**; Kim Poong	— —	Jung Chang-wook; **Park Joon-woo**
14	February 16	Joon Park (g.o.d), Moon Hee-joon	Sam Kim; Hong Seok-cheon	— 3 — **7**	**Mihal Ashminov**; **Jung Chang-wook**
15	February 23	Joon Park (g.o.d), Moon Hee-joon	**Lee Won-il**; **Choi Hyun-seok**	— —	Park Joon-woo; Kim Poong
16	March 2	Kim Ye-won, Soyou (Sistar)	**Jung Chang-wook**; Lee Won-il	— —	Kim Poong; **Park Joon-woo**
17	March 9	Kim Ye-won, Soyou (Sistar)	Hong Seok-cheon; **Choi Hyun-seok**	— —	**Mihal Ashminov**; Sam Kim
18	March 16	Jung Kyung-ho, Yoon Hyun-min	Kim Poong; Jung Chang-wook	— —	**Lee Won-il**; **Sam Kim**
19	March 23	Jung Kyung-ho, Yoon Hyun-min	**Choi Hyun-seok**; **Hong Seok-cheon**	— —	Mihal Ashminov; Park Joon-woo
20	March 30	Lee Kyu-han, Kim Ki-bang	Jung Chang-wook; **Lee Yeon-bok**	— —	**Hong Seok-cheon**; Lee Won-il
21	April 6	Lee Kyu-han, Kim Ki-bang	Mihal Ashminov; **Sam Kim**	— —	**Park Joon-woo**; Kim Poong
22	April 13	Kang Kyun-sung (Noel), Kang Ye-won	Mihal Ashminov; **Jung Chang-wook**	— —	**Kim Poong**; Lee Yeon-bok
23	April 20	Kang Kyun-sung (Noel), Kang Ye-won	Hong Seok-cheon; Choi Hyun-seok	— —	**Park Joon-woo**; **Lee Won-il**
24	April 27	Kim Na-young, Yang Hee-eun	**Jung Chang-wook**; Sam Kim	— —	Mihal Ashminov; **Park Joon-woo**
25	May 4	Kim Na-young, Yang Hee-eun	**Lee Won-il**; **Lee Yeon-bok**	— —	Kim Poong; Choi Hyun-seok
26	May 11	K.Will, Jung Joon-young	**Mihal Ashminov**; Sam Kim	— —	Lee Won-il; **Kim Poong**
27	May 18	K.Will, Jung Joon-young	**Jung Chang-wook**; **Hong Seok-cheon**	— —	Park Joon-woo; Choi Hyun-seok
28	May 25	Jinusean	Maeng Gi-yong; Kim Poong	— —	**Lee Won-il**; **Lee Yeon-bok**
29	June 1	Jinusean	**Sam Kim**; Choi Hyun-seok	— —	Mihal Ashminov; **Jung Chang-wook**
30	June 8	Hong Jin-young, Park Hyun-bin	Jung Chang-wook; Kim Poong	— —	**Sam Kim**; **Maeng Gi-yong**
31	June 15	Hong Jin-young, Park Hyun-bin	**Choi Hyun-seok**; **Hong Seok-cheon**	— —	Park Joon-woo; Mihal Ashminov
32	June 22	Sunny (SNSD), Sungkyu (INFINITE)	Park Joon-woo; Sam Kim	— —	**Maeng Gi-yong**; **Choi Hyun-seok**
33	June 29	Sunny (SNSD), Sungkyu (INFINITE)	Lee Won-il; Mihal Ashminov	— —	**Kim Poong**; **Lee Yeon-bok**
34	July 6	Lena Park, Lee Moon-se	**Lee Won-il**; Choi Hyun-seok	— —	Kim Poong; **Mihal Ashminov**
35	July 13	Lena Park, Lee Moon-se	Jung Chang-wook; Lee Yeon-bok	— —	**Hong Seok-cheon**; **Sam Kim**
36	July 20	BoA, Key (SHINee)	**Lee Won-il**; Choi Hyun-seok	— —	Park Joon-woo; **Oh Se-deuk**
37	July 27	BoA, Key (SHINee)	**Mihal Ashminov**; **Hong Seok-cheon**	— —	Kim Poong; Sam Kim
38	August 3	Kim Young-chul, Choi Hwa-jung	**Sam Kim**; Lee Chan-oh	— —	Lee Won-il; **Hong Seok-cheon**
39	August 10	Kim Young-chul, Choi Hwa-jung	**Mihal Ashminov**; **Lee Yeon-bok**	— —	Park Joon-woo; Kim Poong
40	August 17	Kim Young-ho, Kim Tae-won	**Jung Chang-wook**; **Sam Kim**	— —	Oh Se-deuk; Kim Poong
41	August 24	Kim Young-ho, Kim Tae-won	Hong Seok-cheon; Choi Hyun-seok	— —	**Lee Won-il**; **Lee Yeon-bok**
42	August 31	Big Bang (Taeyang, G-Dragon)	Lee Won-il; Sam Kim	— —	**Oh Se-deuk**; **Choi Hyun-seok**
43	September 7	Big Bang (Taeyang, G-Dragon)	**Kim Poong**; Hong Seok-cheon	— —	Lee Chan-oh; **Lee Yeon-bok**
44	September 14	Kim Young-kwang, Ha Seok-jin	Sam Kim; **Choi Hyun-seok**	— —	**Mihal Ashminov**; Lee Chan-oh
45	September 21	Kim Young-kwang, Ha Seok-jin	**Kim Poong**; Lee Won-il	— —	Park Joon-woo; **Lee Yeon-bok**
46	September 28	Lee Sun-kyun, Im Won-hee	**Mihal Ashminov**; Sam Kim	— —	Kim Poong; **Lee Yeon-bok**
47	October 5	Lee Sun-kyun, Im Won-hee	Hong Seok-cheon; Oh Se-deuk	— —	**Choi Hyun-seok**; **Lee Chan-oh**
48	October 12	Bora (Sistar), Hani (EXID)	Mihal Ashminov; Choi Hyun-seok	— —	**Lee Yeon-bok**; **Sam Kim**
49	October 19	Bora (Sistar), Hani (EXID)	Kim Poong; **Lee Won-il**	— —	**Oh Se-deuk**; Lee Chan-oh
50	October 26	Kang Sue-jin, Seo Jang-hoon	**Choi Hyun-seok**; **Hong Seok-cheon**	— —	Jung Ho-young; Oh Se-deuk
51	November 2	Kang Sue-jin, Seo Jang-hoon	**Sam Kim**; Lee Yeon-bok	— —	Lee Chan-oh; **Kim Poong**
52	November 9	**1st Anniversary Special**; Choi Hyun-seok, Kim Poong	**Hong Seok-cheon**; **Lee Won-il**; Kim Sung-joo	— — —	Mihal Ashminov; Oh Se-deuk; **Jeong Hyeong-don**
53	November 16	**1st Anniversary Special**; Choi Hyun-seok, Kim Poong	Park Joon-woo; Sam Kim; **Choi Hyun-seok**	— — —	**Lee Chan-oh**; **Lee Yeon-bok**; Kim Poong
54	November 23	Shin Seung-hun, Park Chan-ho	Sam Kim; Kim Poong	— —	**Lee Won-il**; **Lee Chan-oh**
55	November 30	Shin Seung-hun, Park Chan-ho	**Hong Seok-cheon**; Choi Hyun-seok	— —	Jung Ho-young; **Oh Se-deuk**
56	December 7	Lee Seung-chul, Lee Ha-nui	Mihal Ashminov; Sam Kim	80 — **85**; 93 — **97**	**Lee Chan-oh**; **Oh Se-deuk**
57	December 14	Lee Seung-chul, Lee Ha-nui	**Kim Poong**; **Choi Hyun-seok**	— —	Jung Ho-young; Lee Yeon-bok
58	December 21	Choi Jung-yoon, Park Jin-hee	**Lee Yeon-bok**; Sam Kim	— —	Lee Chan-oh; **Kim Poong**
59	December 28	Choi Jung-yoon, Park Jin-hee	Choi Hyun-seok; **Mihal Ashminov**	— —	**Lee Won-il**; Oh Se-deuk

=== 2016 ===
Episodes 60–111

Episodes 106–107: Scores are the number of predictions (that who would win) before each match by 100 special spectators at the filming place, but it didn't affect the main guest's final choice.

Episode #	Broadcast Date	Guests	Chefs' Cooking Matches		
60	January 4	Moon Chae-won, Yoo Yeon-seok	Hong Seok-cheon; Lee Yeon-bok	— —	**Choi Hyun-seok**; **Mihal Ashminov**
61	January 11	Moon Chae-won, Yoo Yeon-seok	Kim Poong; **Sam Kim**	— —	**Oh Se-deuk**; Jung Ho-young
62	January 18	Jang Do-yeon, Park Na-rae	**Lee Yeon-bok**; **Lee Won-il**	— —	Oh Se-deuk; Lee Chan-oh
63	January 25	Jang Do-yeon, Park Na-rae	Mihal Ashminov; Choi Hyun-seok	— —	**Kim Poong**; **Sam Kim**
64	February 1	Tablo, Simon Dominic	**Lee Yeon-bok**; Lee Chan-oh	— —	Kim Poong; **Jung Ho-young**
65	February 8	Tablo, Simon Dominic	**Sam Kim**; **Hong Seok-cheon**	— —	Mihal Ashminov; Choi Hyun-seok
66	February 15	Choi Ji-woo, Kim Joo-hyuk	Choi Hyun-seok; **Lee Yeon-bok**	— —	**Lee Chan-oh**; Mihal Ashminov
67	February 22	Choi Ji-woo, Kim Joo-hyuk	Sam Kim; Kim Poong	— —	**Oh Se-deuk**; **Jung Ho-young**
68	February 29	Kim Bum-soo, Leeteuk (Super Junior)	**Mihal Ashminov**; **Choi Hyun-seok**	— —	Lee Chan-oh; Kim Poong
69	March 7	Kim Bum-soo, Leeteuk (Super Junior)	Lee Won-il; Sam Kim	— —	**Jung Ho-young**; **Lee Yeon-bok**
70	March 14	HyunA (4Minute), Jessi	**Hong Seok-cheon**; Choi Hyun-seok	— —	Jung Ho-young; **Lee Yeon-bok**
71	March 21	HyunA (4Minute), Jessi	**Kim Poong**; **Sam Kim**	— —	Lee Chan-oh; Oh Se-deuk
72	March 28	Kim Heung-gook, Lee Chun-soo	Lee Yeon-bok; **Kim Poong**	— —	**Jung Ho-young**; Oh Se-deuk
73	April 4	Kim Heung-gook, Lee Chun-soo	Lee Chan-oh; **Sam Kim**	— —	**Mihal Ashminov**; Choi Hyun-seok
74	April 11	Kim Won-jun, Lee Sang-min	**Choi Hyun-seok**; Mihal Ashminov	— —	Lee Chan-oh; **Oh Se-deuk**
75	April 18	Kim Won-jun, Lee Sang-min	Kim Poong; Sam Kim	— —	**Hong Seok-cheon**; **Lee Yeon-bok**
76	April 25	Han Go-eun, Lee Sung-kyung	Sam Kim; **Lee Yeon-bok**	— —	**Mihal Ashminov**; Jung Ho-young
77	May 2	Han Go-eun, Lee Sung-kyung	Oh Se-deuk; **Choi Hyun-seok**	— —	**Lee Chan-oh**; Kim Poong
78	May 9	Lee Je-hoon, Kim Sung-kyun	**Lee Yeon-bok**; Sam Kim	— —	Hong Seok-cheon; **Kim Poong**
79	May 16	Lee Je-hoon, Kim Sung-kyun	Mihal Ashminov; **Choi Hyun-seok**	— —	**Lee Chan-oh**; Oh Se-deuk
80	May 23	Lee Sung-jae, Yum Jung-ah	Kim Poong; Lee Yeon-bok	— —	**Lee Chan-oh**; **Oh Se-deuk**
81	May 30	Lee Sung-jae, Yum Jung-ah	Choi Hyun-seok; **Sam Kim**	— —	**Mihal Ashminov**; Jung Ho-young
82	June 6	Kim Jong-min (Koyote), Jang Su-won (Sechs Kies)	Oh Se-deuk; **Lee Yeon-bok**	— —	**Jung Ho-young**; Kim Poong
83	June 13	Kim Jong-min (Koyote), Jang Su-won (Sechs Kies)	Mihal Ashminov; **Choi Hyun-seok**	— —	**Lee Chan-oh**; Sam Kim
84	June 20	Twice (Tzuyu, Jeongyeon); Fiestar (Cao Lu, Yezi)	Choi Hyun-seok; Mihal Ashminov	— —	**Jung Ho-young**; **Kim Poong**
85	June 27	Twice (Tzuyu, Jeongyeon); Fiestar (Cao Lu, Yezi)	**Lee Yeon-bok**; **Sam Kim**	— —	Oh Se-deuk; Lee Won-il
86	July 4	Baro (B1A4), Tak Jae-hoon	Hong Seok-cheon; Oh Se-deuk	— —	**Mihal Ashminov**; **Jung Ho-young**
87	July 11	Baro (B1A4), Tak Jae-hoon	**Lee Sang-min**; Lee Yeon-bok	— —	Kim Poong; **Sam Kim**
88	July 18	John Park, Kim Jun-hyun	**Lee Yeon-bok**; Lee Won-il	— —	Kim Poong; **Oh Se-deuk**
89	July 25	John Park, Kim Jun-hyun	**Mihal Ashminov**; Choi Hyun-seok	— —	Jung Ho-young; **Sam Kim**
90	August 1	**Summer Special**; Lee Jae-yoon, Ye Ji-won	Hong Seok-cheon; **Choi Hyun-seok**	— —	**Kim Poong**; Oh Se-deuk
91	August 8	**Summer Special**; Lee Jae-yoon, Ye Ji-won	**Sam Kim**; **Lee Yeon-bok**	— —	Mihal Ashminov; Jung Ho-young
92	August 15	Baek Ji-young, Ji Sang-ryeol	Choi Hyun-seok; Yoo Chang-joon	— —	**Lee Won-il**; **Sam Kim**
93	August 22	Baek Ji-young, Ji Sang-ryeol	**Mihal Ashminov**; Kim Poong	— —	Jung Ho-young; **Oh Se-deuk**
94	August 29	Park Geun-hyung, Kim Mi-sook	Sam Kim; Choi Hyun-seok	— —	**Jung Ho-young**; **Kim Poong**
95	September 5	Park Geun-hyung, Kim Mi-sook	**Mihal Ashminov**; Han Sang-hoon	— —	Oh Se-deuk; **Lee Yeon-bok**
96	September 12	Im Chang-jung, On Joo-wan	Sam Kim; **Park Ri-hye**	— —	**Kim Poong**; Mihal Ashminov
97	September 19	Im Chang-jung, On Joo-wan	**Oh Se-deuk**; Lee Yeon-bok	— —	Jung Ho-young; **Choi Hyun-seok**
98	September 26	Gain (Brown Eyed Girls), Taecyeon (2PM)	**Lee Yeon-bok**; **Kim Poong**	— —	Jung Ho-young; Oh Se-deuk
99	October 3	Gain (Brown Eyed Girls), Taecyeon (2PM)	Sam Kim; **Motokawa Atsushi**	— —	**Mihal Ashminov**; Choi Hyun-seok
100	October 10	100th Episode Special; Sungkyu (INFINITE), Kim Heung-gook	**Choi Hyun-seok**; **Lee Yeon-bok**	— —	Lee Jae-hoon; Choi Hyung-jin
101	October 17	100th Episode Special; Sungkyu (INFINITE), Kim Heung-gook	**Kim Poong**; **Sam Kim**	— —	Kim Min-jun; Raymon Kim
102	October 24	Jackson (Got7), Henry (Super Junior-M)	**Sam Kim**; **Choi Hyun-seok**	— —	Oh Se-deuk; Mihal Ashminov
103	October 31	Jackson (Got7), Henry (Super Junior-M)	**Kim Poong**; **Yeo Kyung-rae**	— —	Jung Ho-young; Lee Yeon-bok
104	November 7	Son Yeon-jae, Cha Tae-hyun	Choi Hyun-seok; **Mihal Ashminov**	— —	**Oh Se-deuk**; Kim Poong
105	November 14	Son Yeon-jae, Cha Tae-hyun	Lee Yeon-bok; **Raymon Kim**	— —	**Jung Ho-young**; Sam Kim
106	November 21	**2nd Anniversary Special**; Lee Dae-ho, Jeong Jun-ha	**Mihal Ashminov**; **Sam Kim**	**45** — 55; **61** — 39	Oh Se-deuk; Choi Hyun-seok
107	November 28	**2nd Anniversary Special**; Lee Dae-ho, Jeong Jun-ha	Lee Won-il; **Lee Yeon-bok**	51 — **49**; **74** — 26	**Jung Ho-young**; Kim Poong
108	December 5	Lee So-ra, Kangta	**Mihal Ashminov**; **Baek Seung-wook**	— —	Oh Se-deuk; Choi Hyun-seok
109	December 12	Lee So-ra, Kangta	Lee Yeon-bok; Kim Poong	— —	**Sam Kim**; **Jung Ho-young**
110	December 19	Gummy, Hwanhee	Mihal Ashminov; Kim Poong	— —	**Choi Hyun-seok**; **Lee Won-il**
111	December 26	Gummy, Hwanhee	**Oh Se-deuk**; **Lee Yeon-bok**	— —	Jung Ho-young; Sam Kim

=== 2017 ===
Episodes 112–161

Episode #	Broadcast Date	Guests	Chefs' Cooking Matches		
112	January 2	Seolhyun (AOA), Yoo Byung-jae	**Lee Jae-hoon**; Raymon Kim	— —	Sam Kim; **Lee Yeon-bok**
113	January 9	Seolhyun (AOA), Yoo Byung-jae	Kim Poong; **Joo Bae-an**	— —	**Choi Hyun-seok**; Park Geon-young
114	January 16	Rain, Alex Chu (Clazziquai)	**Jung Ho-young**; Joo Bae-an	— —	Sam Kim; **Lee Yeon-bok**
115	January 23	Rain, Alex Chu (Clazziquai)	**Raymon Kim**; **Kim Poong**	— —	Choi Hyun-seok; Lee Jae-hoon
116	January 30	**New Year Families Special**; Akdong Musician, Kim Hyung-gyu & Kim Yoon-ah	**Lee Jae-hoon**; Yoo Hyun-soo	— —	Raymon Kim; **Choi Hyun-seok**
117	February 6	**New Year Families Special**; Akdong Musician, Kim Hyung-gyu & Kim Yoon-ah	Oh Se-deuk; **Kim Poong**	— —	**Mihal Ashminov**; Lee Yeon-bok
118	February 13	Yoon Doo-joon (HIGHLIGHT), Lee Si-eon	Yoo Hyun-soo; Lee Jae-hoon	— —	**Mihal Ashminov**; **Choi Hyun-seok**
119	February 20	Yoon Doo-joon (HIGHLIGHT), Lee Si-eon	Jung Ho-young; Sam Kim	— —	**Lee Yeon-bok**; **Kim Poong**
120	February 27	Choi Min-yong, Yoon Jung-soo	**Yoo Hyun-soo**; **Raymon Kim**	— —	Lee Yeon-bok; Kim Poong
121	March 13	Choi Min-yong, Yoon Jung-soo	**Sam Kim**; **Park Geon-young**	— —	Choi Hyun-seok; Jung Ho-young
122	March 20	Jo Se-ho, DinDin	**Jung Ho-young**; **Lee Won-il**	— —	Kim Poong; Lee Yeon-bok
123	March 27	Jo Se-ho, DinDin	**Oh Se-deuk**; Yoon Hyun-soo	— —	Choi Hyun-seok; **Sam Kim**
124	April 3	Jung Yong-hwa (CNBLUE), Roy Kim	**Raymon Kim**; Lee Yeon-bok	— —	Sam Kim; **Kim Poong**
125	April 10	Jung Yong-hwa (CNBLUE), Roy Kim	**Yoo Hyun-soo**; **Mihal Ashminov**	— —	Lee Jae-hoon; Choi Hyun-seok
126	April 17	Lee Deok-hwa, Park Sang-myun	Sam Kim; **Jung Ho-young**	— —	**Lee Yeon-bok**; Lee Jae-hoon
127	April 24	Lee Deok-hwa, Park Sang-myun	Lee Won-il; Mihal Ashminov	— —	**Yoo Hyun-soo**; **Kim Poong**
128	May 1	Bada (S.E.S.), Solbi	**Oh Se-deuk**; **Yoo Hyun-soo**	— —	Sam Kim; Lee Yeon-bok
129	May 8	Bada (S.E.S.), Solbi	**Raymon Kim**; **Mihal Ashminov**	— —	Kim Poong; Jung Ho-young
130	May 15	Lee Soo-kyung, Hyolyn (Sistar)	Mihal Ashminov; Kim Min-jun	— —	**Lee Yeon-bok**; **Kim Poong**
131	May 22	Lee Soo-kyung, Hyolyn (Sistar)	Lee Jae-hoon; Raymon Kim	— —	**Sam Kim**; **Yoo Hyun-soo**
132	May 29	Oh Hyun-kyung, Lee Moon-sik	**Jung Ho-young**; **Raymon Kim**	— —	Sam Kim; Lee Yeon-bok
133	June 5	Oh Hyun-kyung, Lee Moon-sik	**Yoo Hyun-soo**; Lee Won-il	— —	Kim Poong; **Mihal Ashminov**
134	June 12	Kim Sook, Song Eun-i	**Lee Yeon-bok**; **Lee Jae-hoon**	— —	Kim Poong; Mihal Ashminov
135	June 19	Kim Sook, Song Eun-i	**Jung Ho-young**; **Lee Won-il**	— —	Yoo Hyun-soo; Sam Kim
136	June 26	Lee Guk-joo, Kim Yong-man	**Lee Jae-hoon**; **Sam Kim**	— —	Lee Yeon-bok; Mihal Ashminov
137	July 3	Lee Guk-joo, Kim Yong-man	Jung Ho-young; **Oh Se-deuk**	— —	**Kim Poong**; Yoo Hyun-soo
138	July 10	Lee Kyung-kyu, Kim Joon-ho	**Lee Jae-hoon**; **Sam Kim**	— —	Yoo Hyun-soo; Lee Yeon-bok
139	July 17	Lee Kyung-kyu, Kim Joon-ho	**Raymon Kim**; **Oh Se-deuk**	— —	Jung Ho-young; Kim Poong
140	July 24	Jeon So-mi, Lee Tae-gon	**Raymon Kim**; **Mihal Ashminov**	— —	Kim Poong; Lee Jae-hoon
141	July 31	Jeon So-mi, Lee Tae-gon	Jung Ho-young; Sam Kim	— —	**Yoo Hyun-soo**; **Lee Yeon-bok**
142	August 7	Lee Hong-gi (F.T. Island), Kim Seung-soo	**Jung Ho-young**; **Raymon Kim**	— —	Kim Poong; Yoo Hyun-soo
143	August 14	Lee Hong-gi (F.T. Island), Kim Seung-soo	Mihal Ashminov; **Lee Jae-hoon**	— —	**Lee Yeon-bok**; Sam Kim
144	August 21	Kim Min-seok, Kwon Hyuk-soo	**Jung Ho-young**; **Raymon Kim**	— —	Yoo Hyun-soo; Lee Yeon-bok
145	August 28	Kim Min-seok, Kwon Hyuk-soo	**Lee Jae-hoon**; Lee Won-il	— —	Kim Poong; **Sam Kim**
146	September 4	Kim Ji-hoon, Seo Min-jung	Mihal Ashminov; Kim Poong	— —	**Sam Kim**; **Raymon Kim**
147	September 11	Kim Ji-hoon, Seo Min-jung	**Oh Se-deuk**; Jung Ho-young	— —	Yoo Hyun-soo; **Lee Yeon-bok**
148	September 18	Byun Jin-sub, Kim Wan-sun	**Oh Se-deuk**; Jung Ho-young	— —	Yoo Hyun-soo; **Raymon Kim**
149	September 25	Byun Jin-sub, Kim Wan-sun	Kim Poong; Mihal Ashminov	— —	**Lee Yeon-bok**; **Sam Kim**
150	October 9	Jung Sang-hoon, Kim Saeng-min	Sam Kim; Mihal Ashminov	— —	**Lee Yeon-bok**; **Jung Ho-young**
151	October 16	Jung Sang-hoon, Kim Saeng-min	Yoo Hyun-soo; Oh Se-deuk	— —	**Kim Poong**; **Raymon Kim**
152	October 23	Tony An & Kim Jae-duck (Sechs Kies), BTS (Jin & Jimin)	**Oh Se-deuk**; Kim Poong	— —	Jung Ho-young; **Raymon Kim**
153	October 30	Tony An & Kim Jae-duck (Sechs Kies), BTS (Jin & Jimin)	Yoo Hyun-soo; **Lee Jae-hoon**	— —	**Lee Yeon-bok**; Sam Kim
154	November 6	Moon Se-yoon, Yoo Min-sang	Mihal Ashminov; **Yoo Hyun-soo**	— —	**Lee Yeon-bok**; Raymon Kim
155	November 13	Moon Se-yoon, Yoo Min-sang	Jung Ho-young; Lee Won-il	— —	**Sam Kim**; **Kim Poong**
156	November 20	**3rd Anniversary Special**; Park Na-rae, Lee Guk-joo	**Chefs' Matches by Team 2:2**; **Semifinal 1: Park Na-rae's Fridge**		
156	November 20	**3rd Anniversary Special**; Park Na-rae, Lee Guk-joo	**Jung Ho-young** & **Yoo Hyun-soo**	—	Lee Yeon-bok & Raymon Kim
156	November 20	**3rd Anniversary Special**; Park Na-rae, Lee Guk-joo	**Semifinal 2: Lee Guk-joo's Fridge**		
156	November 20	**3rd Anniversary Special**; Park Na-rae, Lee Guk-joo	Kim Poong & Oh Se-deuk	—	**Sam Kim** & **Mihal Ashminov**
156	November 20	**3rd Anniversary Special**; Park Na-rae, Lee Guk-joo	**Final: Lee Guk-joo's Fridge**		
157	November 27	**3rd Anniversary Special**; Park Na-rae, Lee Guk-joo	**Jung Ho-young** & **Yoo Hyun-soo**	—	Sam Kim & Mihal Ashminov
157	November 27	**3rd Anniversary Special**; Park Na-rae, Lee Guk-joo	**MCs' Cooking Match: Park Na-rae's Fridge**		
157	November 27	**3rd Anniversary Special**; Park Na-rae, Lee Guk-joo	**Kim Sung-joo**	—	Ahn Jung-hwan
157	November 27	**3rd Anniversary Special**; Park Na-rae, Lee Guk-joo	**Guests' Cooking Match: Guests' Fridge** (Note: The guest's score is the votes by 2 MCs and 8 chefs.)		
157	November 27	**3rd Anniversary Special**; Park Na-rae, Lee Guk-joo	Park Na-rae	3—**7**	**Lee Guk-joo**
158	December 4	Hong Sung-heon, Oh Seung-hwan	Sam Kim; Kim Poong	— —	**Raymon Kim**; **Yoo Hyun-soo**
159	December 11	Hong Sung-heon, Oh Seung-hwan	Lee Yeon-bok; Oh Se-deuk	— —	**Gordon Ramsay**; **Jung Ho-young**
160	December 18	**Season 2017's Championship Matches**; Kim Seung-soo, Lee Tae-gon	**#5 vs #6 Match**		
160	December 18	**Season 2017's Championship Matches**; Kim Seung-soo, Lee Tae-gon	**Sam Kim**	—	Kim Poong
160	December 18	**Season 2017's Championship Matches**; Kim Seung-soo, Lee Tae-gon	**2017 TOP 2 Ratings' Guests' Match**		
160	December 18	**Season 2017's Championship Matches**; Kim Seung-soo, Lee Tae-gon	Kim Seung-soo	3—**7**	**Lee Tae-gon**
161	December 25	**Season 2017's Championship Matches**; Kim Seung-soo, Lee Tae-gon	**#3 vs #4 Match**		
161	December 25	**Season 2017's Championship Matches**; Kim Seung-soo, Lee Tae-gon	**Jung Ho-young**	—	Yoo Hyun-soo
161	December 25	**Season 2017's Championship Matches**; Kim Seung-soo, Lee Tae-gon	**Champion Match**		
161	December 25	**Season 2017's Championship Matches**; Kim Seung-soo, Lee Tae-gon	**Lee Yeon-bok**	—	Raymon Kim

Remarks

=== 2018 ===
Episodes 162–209

Episode #	Broadcast Date	Guests	Chefs' Cooking Matches		
162	January 1	Monk Hyemin, Jang Seo-hee	Sam Kim; Jung Ho-young	— —	**Yoo Hyun-soo**; **Lee Yeon-bok**
163	January 8	Monk Hyemin, Jang Seo-hee	**Mihal Ashminov**; **Oh Se-deuk**	— —	Raymon Kim; Kim Poong
164	January 15	Defconn, Kim Dong-hyun	**Oh Se-deuk**; **Kim Poong**	— —	Yoo Hyun-soo; Lee Yeon-bok
165	January 22	Defconn, Kim Dong-hyun	**Sam Kim**; **Jung Ji-seon**	— —	Jung Ho-young; Raymon Kim
166	January 29	Lee Kye-in, Kim Shin-young	Jung Ji-seon; Jung Ho-young	— —	**Yoo Hyun-soo**; **Kim Poong**
167	February 5	Lee Kye-in, Kim Shin-young	**Raymon Kim**; **Mihal Ashminov**	— —	Sam Kim; Lee Yeon-bok
168	February 12	**New Year Special**; Alberto Mondi, Sam Okyere	Lee Yeon-bok; Tony Jung	— —	**Yoo Hyun-soo**; **Sam Kim**
169	February 19	**New Year Special**; Alberto Mondi, Sam Okyere	**Raymon Kim**; Oh Se-deuk	— —	Kim Poong; **Mihal Ashminov**
170	February 26	Bae Jong-ok, Park Chul-min	**Tony Jung**; **Oh Se-deuk**	— —	Yoo Hyun-soo; Raymon Kim
171	March 5	Bae Jong-ok, Park Chul-min	Jung Ji-seon; **Jung Ho-young**	— —	**Kim Poong**; Sam Kim
172	March 12	**Yolympic 2018 Special**; Pak Se-ri, Choo Sung-hoon	Raymon Kim; **Sam Kim**	— —	**Rupert Blease**; Ciro Petrone
173	March 19	**Yolympic 2018 Special**; Pak Se-ri, Choo Sung-hoon	**Yoo Hyun-soo**	—	Benjamin Wan
173	March 19	**Yolympic 2018 Special**; Pak Se-ri, Choo Sung-hoon	Lee Yeon bok & Kim Poong	—	**Motokawa Atsushi** & **Jung Ho-young**
174	March 26	Jo Woo-jong, Jang Sung-gyu	**Oh Se-deuk**; **Jung Ho-young**	— —	Yoo Hyun-soo; Raymon Kim
175	April 2	Jo Woo-jong, Jang Sung-gyu	**Lee Yeon-bok**; **Sam Kim**	— —	Mihal Ashminov; Kim Poong
176	April 9	Shindong (Super Junior), Don Spike	Jung Ho-young; **Jung Ji-seon**	— —	**Kim Poong**; Lee Yeon-bok
177	April 16	Shindong (Super Junior), Don Spike	**Raymon Kim**; **Sam Kim**	— —	Oh Se-deuk; Yoo Hyun-soo
178	April 23	Kim Soo-ro, Kim Sung-ryung	Mihal Ashminov; **Oh Se-deuk**	— —	**Sam Kim**; Kim Poong
179	April 30	Kim Soo-ro, Kim Sung-ryung	**Lee Yeon-bok**; Tony Jung	— —	Yoo Hyun-soo; **Raymon Kim**
180	May 7	Kwak Yoon-gy, Kim A-lang	Kim Poong; Mihal Ashminov	— —	**Yoo Hyun-soo**; **Raymon Kim**
181	May 14	Kwak Yoon-gy, Kim A-lang	Jung Ho-young; Lee Yeon-bok	— —	**Sam Kim**; **Oh Se-deuk**
182	May 21	Wanna One (Ong Seong-wu, Kang Daniel), Gugudan (Nayoung, Sejeong)	**Kim Poong**; Yoo Hyun-soo	— —	Raymon Kim; **Sam Kim**
183	May 28	Wanna One (Ong Seong-wu, Kang Daniel), Gugudan (Nayoung, Sejeong)	**Lee Yeon-bok**; Kim Hyung-seok	— —	Oh Se-deuk; **Jung Ho-young**
184	June 11	**World Cup Special**; Choi Yong-soo, Minho (Shinee)	**Oh Se-deuk**; Kim Hyung-seok	— —	Sam Kim; **Raymon Kim**
185	June 25	**World Cup Special**; Choi Yong-soo, Minho (Shinee)	**Kim Poong**; Jung Ho-young	— —	Yoo Hyun-soo; **Lee Yeon-bok**
186	July 2	Kim Ji-woo, Kolleen Park	Kim Poong; **Choi Seok-yi**	— —	**Oh Se-deuk**; Lee Yeon-bok
187	July 9	Kim Ji-woo, Kolleen Park	**Yoo Hyun-soo**; **Mihal Ashminov**	— —	Raymon Kim; Sam Kim
188	July 16	Han Hyun-min, Eric Nam	Mihal Ashminov; Jung Ho-young	— —	**Yoo Hyun-soo**; **Kim Poong**
189	July 23	Han Hyun-min, Eric Nam	**Lee Yeon-bok**; **Oh Se-deuk**	— —	Raymon Kim; Sam Kim
190	July 30	Kim Bo-sung, Ahn Jae-wook	**Jung Ho-young**; **Yoo Hyun-soo**	— —	Kim Poong; Sam Kim
191	August 6	Kim Bo-sung, Ahn Jae-wook	**Lee Yeon-bok**; Mihal Ashminov	— —	Oh Se-deuk; **Raymon Kim**
192	August 13	Seungri (Big Bang), Hwasa (Mamamoo)	Raymon Kim; **Kim Poong**	— —	**Sam Kim**; Oh Se-deuk
193	August 20	Seungri (Big Bang), Hwasa (Mamamoo)	**Jung Ho-young**; Mihal Ashminov	— —	Yoo Hyun-soo; **Lee Yeon-bok**
194	September 3	Microdot, Yang Dong-geun	**Jung Ho-young**; Lee Yeon-bok	— —	Sam Kim; **Kim Poong**
195	September 10	Microdot, Yang Dong-geun	Mihal Ashminov; **Raymon Kim**	— —	**Oh Se-deuk**; Yoo Hyun-soo
196	September 17	Kim Byeong-ok, Park Jun-gyu	**Lee Yeon-bok**; **Jung Ho-young**	— —	Oh Se-deuk; Raymon Kim
197	October 1	Kim Byeong-ok, Park Jun-gyu	Mihal Ashminov; Kim Poong	— —	**Yoo Hyun-soo**; **Sam Kim**
198	October 8	Park Sung-kwang, Byun Jung-soo	**Mihal Ashminov**; **Kim Poong**	— —	Raymon Kim; Yoo Hyun-soo
199	October 15	Park Sung-kwang, Byun Jung-soo	**Jung Ho-young**; Lee Yeon-bok	— —	Oh Se-deuk; **Sam Kim**
200	October 22	Noh Sa-yeon, Kian84	Mihal Ashminov; **Lee Yeon-bok**	— —	**Oh Se-deuk**; Yoo Hyun-soo
201	October 29	Noh Sa-yeon, Kian84	**Raymon Kim**; Jung Ho-young	— —	Kim Poong; **Sam Kim**
202	November 5	Wheesung, Johan Kim	Jung Ho-young; Mihal Ashminov	— —	**Lee Yeon-bok**; **Kim Poong**
203	November 12	Wheesung, Johan Kim	Raymon Kim; Yun Jong Chŏl	— —	**Sam Kim**; **Yoo Hyun-soo**
204	November 19	Han Eun-jung, Byul (Note: Special appearance by Haha on episode 205.)	**Yoo Hyun-soo**; **Mihal Ashminov**	— —	Sam Kim; Jung Ho-young
205	November 26	Han Eun-jung, Byul	Oh Se-deuk; **Raymon Kim**	— —	**Kim Poong**; Lee Yeon-bok
206	December 3	Ha Hyun-woo (Guckkasten), Yoon Do-hyun	**Jung Ho-young**; Mihal Ashminov	— —	Sam Kim; **Yoo Hyun-soo**
207	December 10	Ha Hyun-woo (Guckkasten), Yoon Do-hyun	Oh Se-deuk; Raymon Kim	— —	**Lee Yeon-bok**; **Kim Poong**
208	December 17	**Season 2018's Championship Matches**; Kim Bo-sung, Choo Sung-hoon	**Semifinal 1**		
208	December 17	**Season 2018's Championship Matches**; Kim Bo-sung, Choo Sung-hoon	Yoo Hyun-soo	—	**Kim Poong**
208	December 17	**Season 2018's Championship Matches**; Kim Bo-sung, Choo Sung-hoon	**Semifinal 2**		
208	December 17	**Season 2018's Championship Matches**; Kim Bo-sung, Choo Sung-hoon	**Lee Yeon-bok**	—	Sam Kim
209	December 24	**Season 2018's Championship Matches**; Kim Bo-sung, Choo Sung-hoon	**#3 vs #4 Match**		
209	December 24	**Season 2018's Championship Matches**; Kim Bo-sung, Choo Sung-hoon	**Yoo Hyun-soo**	—	Sam Kim
209	December 24	**Season 2018's Championship Matches**; Kim Bo-sung, Choo Sung-hoon	**Champion Match**		
209	December 24	**Season 2018's Championship Matches**; Kim Bo-sung, Choo Sung-hoon	Kim Poong	—	**Lee Yeon-bok**

=== 2019 ===
Episodes 210–254

Episode #	Broadcast Date	Guests	Chefs' Cooking Matches		
210	January 14	Park Joong-hoon, Shin Hyun-joon	Raymon Kim; **Jung Ho-young**	— —	**Kim Poong**; Yoo Hyun-soo
211	January 21	Park Joong-hoon, Shin Hyun-joon	Mihal Ashminov; **Oh Se-deuk**	— —	**Sam Kim**; Lee Yeon-bok
212	January 28	Son Dam-bi, Kwanghee (ZE:A)	Raymon Kim; **Yoo Hyun-soo**	— —	**Sam Kim**; Lee Yeon-bok
213	February 11	Son Dam-bi, Kwanghee (ZE:A)	**Kim Seung-min**; Oh Se-deuk	— —	Jung Ho-young; **Kim Poong**
214	February 18	Hwang Chi-yeul, Lee Gi-kwang (Highlight)	**Jung Ho-young**; Raymon Kim	— —	Kim Poong; **Lee Yeon-bok**
215	February 25	Hwang Chi-yeul, Lee Gi-kwang (Highlight)	Kim Seung-min; **Oh Se-deuk**	— —	**Yoo Hyun-soo**; Sam Kim
216	March 4	Lee Seung-yoon, Ryu Soo-young	**Raymon Kim**; **Lee Yeon-bok**	— —	Yoo Hyun-soo; Jung Ho-young
217	March 11	Lee Seung-yoon, Ryu Soo-young	Kim Seung-min; Oh Se-deuk	— —	**Sam Kim**; **Kim Poong**
218	March 18	Joo Ho-min, Lee Mal-nyeon	Raymon Kim; Kim Seung-min	— —	**Kim Poong**; **Oh Se-deuk**
219	March 25	Joo Ho-min, Lee Mal-nyeon	Lee Yeon-bok; **Jung Ho-young**	— —	**Sam Kim**; Yoo Hyun-soo
220	April 1	Ahn So-hee, Lee Yi-kyung	Mihal Ashminov; **Raymon Kim**	— —	**Yoo Hyun-soo**; Jung Ho-young
221	April 8	Ahn So-hee, Lee Yi-kyung	**Oh Se-deuk**; **Kim Seung-min**	— —	Sam Kim; Kim Poong
222	April 15	Sam Hammington, Kang Hyung-wook	Lee Yeon-bok; Kim Seung-min	— —	**Raymon Kim**; **Jung Ho-young**
223	April 22	Sam Hammington, Kang Hyung-wook	**Sam Kim**; **Yoo Hyun-soo**	— —	Kim Poong; Oh Se-deuk
224	April 29	Hong Hyun-hee & Jason, Yoo Se-yoon	**Lee Yeon-bok**; Raymon Kim	— —	Sam Kim; **Oh Se-deuk**
225	May 6	Hong Hyun-hee & Jason, Yoo Se-yoon	Yoo Hyun-soo; Mihal Ashminov	— —	**Kim Poong**; **Jung Ho-young**
226	May 13	Kim So-hyun, Jang Yun-jeong	Jung Ho-young; **Oh Se-deuk**	— —	**Sam Kim**; Kim Poong
227	May 20	Kim So-hyun, Jang Yun-jeong	**Lee Yeon-bok**; **Song Hoon**	— —	Raymon Kim; Yoo Hyun-soo
228	May 27	Ko Ji-yong & Heo Yang-im, (Note: Special appearance by their son Ko Seung-jae on episode 228.); Yeo Esther & Hong Hye-geol	**Lee Yeon-bok**; **Raymon Kim**	— —	Oh Se-deuk; Kim Poong
229	June 3	Ko Ji-yong & Heo Yang-im, Yeo Esther & Hong Hye-geol	Song Hoon; **Yoo Hyun-soo**	— —	**Sam Kim**; Jung Ho-young
230	June 10	Kim Soo-yong, Ji Suk-jin	Yoo Hyun-soo; Jung Ho-young	— —	**Sam Kim**; **Oh Se-deuk**
231	June 17	Kim Soo-yong, Ji Suk-jin	**Raymon Kim**; **Song Hoon**	— —	Lee Yeon-bok; Kim Poong
232	June 24	Shinhwa (Jun Jin, Lee Min-woo)	Kim Poong; **Yoo Hyun-soo**	— —	**Lee Yeon-bok**; Oh Se-deuk
233	July 1	Shinhwa (Jun Jin, Lee Min-woo)	Song Hoon; Jung Ho-young	— —	**Raymon Kim**; **Sam Kim**
234	July 8	Chun Woo-hee, Ahn Jae-hong	**Song Hoon**; **Yoo Hyun-soo**	— —	Lee Yeon-bok; Oh Se-deuk
235	July 15	Chun Woo-hee, Ahn Jae-hong	**Jung Ho-young**; **Raymon Kim**	— —	Kim Poong; Sam Kim
236	July 22	Hur Jae, Han Sang-jin	**Raymon Kim**; **Lee Yeon-bok**	— —	Yoo Hyun-soo; Oh Se-deuk
237	July 29	Hur Jae, Han Sang-jin	**Song Hoon**; Kim Poong	— —	Jung Ho-young; **Sam Kim**
238	August 5	Lee Bong-won, Lee Man-gi	Song Hoon; **Oh Se-deuk**	— —	**Kim Poong**; Sam Kim
239	August 12	Lee Bong-won, Lee Man-gi	**Lee Yeon-bok**; Jung Ho-young	— —	Raymon Kim; **Yoo Hyun-soo**
240	August 19	Song Kyung-ah, Oh Jeong-yeon	**Song Hoon**; Oh Se-deuk	— —	Yoo Hyun-soo; **Sam Kim**
241	August 26	Song Kyung-ah, Oh Jeong-yeon	Lee Yeon-bok; Jung Ho-young	— —	**Raymon Kim**; **Kim Poong**
242	September 2	Kang Sung-jin, Park Jung-soo	**Kim Poong**; **Song Hoon**	— —	Sam Kim; Oh Se-deuk
243	September 9	Kang Sung-jin, Park Jung-soo	**Lee Yeon-bok**; **Jung Ho-young**	— —	Yoo Hyun-soo; Raymon Kim
244	September 16	Kang Ki-young, Kim Rae-won	Song Hoon; Yoo Hyun-soo	— —	**Raymon Kim**; **Kim Poong**
245	September 23	Kang Ki-young, Kim Rae-won	Lee Yeon-bok; Jung Ho-young	— —	**Sam Kim**; **Oh Se-deuk**
246	September 30	Lee Yoon-ji, Oh Ji-ho	**Raymon Kim**; Jung Ho-young	— —	Sam Kim; **Yoo Hyun-soo**
247	October 7	Lee Yoon-ji, Oh Ji-ho	Song Hoon; **Oh Se-deuk**	— —	**Lee Yeon-bok**; Kim Poong
248	October 14	Kan Mi-youn, (Note: Special appearance by Hwang Ba-wool) Eugene (S.E.S.)	Jung Ho-young; **Yoo Hyun-soo**	— —	**Raymon Kim**; Kim Poong
249	October 21	Kan Mi-youn, Eugene (S.E.S.)	**Song Hoon**; **Lee Yeon-bok**	— —	Sam Kim; Oh Se-deuk
250	October 28	Park Joon-geum, Boom	Song Hoon; **Jung Ho-young**	— —	**Raymon Kim**; Oh Se-deuk
251	November 4	Park Joon-geum, Boom	Kim Poong; Yoo Hyun-soo	— —	**Lee Yeon-bok**; **Sam Kim**
252	November 11	**5th Anniversary Special**; Chun Jung-myung, Jin Yi-han	**Raymon Kim**; **Jung Ho-young**	— —	Sam Kim; Lee Yeon-bok
253	November 18	**5th Anniversary Special**; Chun Jung-myung, Jin Yi-han	**Song Hoon**; Oh Se-deuk	— —	Kim Poong; **Yoo Hyun-soo**
254	November 25	Highlights			

=== 2024-2025 ===
Episodes 255–307

Episode #	Broadcast Date	Guests	Chefs' Cooking Matches		
255	December 15	Young Tak, Lee Mal-nyeon	**Lee Yeon-bok**; **Choi Hyun-seok**	— —	Lee Mi-young; Edward Lee
256	December 22	Young Tak, Lee Mal-nyeon	**Jung Ho-young**; Kim Poong	— —	Choi Kang-rok; **Park Eun-yeong**
257	January 5	Lee Hee-joon, Song Joong-ki	**Choi Hyun-seok**; **Park Eun-yeong**	— —	Kim Poong; Lee Yeon-bok
258	January 12	Lee Hee-joon, Song Joong-ki	**Jung Ho-young**; Kwon Sung-jun	— —	Choi Kang-rok; **Sam Kim**
259	January 19	Jang Won-young, Lee Eun-ji	**Choi Hyun-seok**; Sam Kim	— —	Kwon Sung-jun; **Son Jong-won**
260	January 26	Jang Won-young, Lee Eun-ji	**Lee Yeon-bok**; Kim Poong	— —	Choi Kang-rok; **Jung Ji-sun**
261	February 2	Son Suk-ku, Hyun Bong-sik	Jung Ho-young; **Kwon Sung-jun**	— —	**Park Eun-yeong**; Edward Lee
262	February 9	Son Suk-ku, Hyun Bong-sik	**Lee Yeon-bok**; Kim Poong	— —	Son Jong-won; **Choi Kang-rok**
263	February 16	Ha Ji-won, Jang Geun-suk	**Sam Kim**; Choi Kang-rok	— —	Kim Poong; **Yoon Nam-no**
264	February 23	Ha Ji-won, Jang Geun-suk	**Choi Hyun-seok**; Lee Yeon-bok	— —	Son Jong-won; **Kwon Sung-jun**
265	March 2	J-Hope, Heo Sung-tae	Yoon Nam-no; Kwon Sung-jun	— —	**Kim Poong**; **Son Jong-won**
266	March 9	J-Hope, Heo Sung-tae	Choi Kang-rok; **Choi Hyun-seok**	— —	**Kim Sohyi**; Sam Kim
267	March 16	Lee Da-hee, Dex	**Son Jong-won**; **Choi Kang-rok**	— —	Yoon Nam-no; Choi Hyun-seok
268	March 23	Lee Da-hee, Dex	**Jung Ho-young**; **Kim Poong**	— —	Sam Kim; Kwon Sung-jun
269	March 30	Cha Jun-hwan, Jung Jae-hyung	Jung Ho-young; **Choi Hyun-seok**	— —	**Yoon Nam-no**; Kim Poong
270	April 6	Cha Jun-hwan, Jung Jae-hyung	**Son Jong-won**; Choi Kang-rok	— —	Sam Kim; **Kwon Sung-jun**
271	April 13	Choi Yang-rak & Paeng Hyun-sook, Park Myung-soo	Park Eun-yeong; **Bae Kyung-jun**	— —	**Jung Ji-sun**; Choi Hyun-seok
272	April 20	Choi Yang-rak & Paeng Hyun-sook, Park Myung-soo	**Fabrizio Ferrari**; Yoon Nam-no	— —	Kwon Sung-jun; **Kim Poong**
273	April 27	Kim Nam-il, Lee Dong-gook	**Choi Hyun-seok**; Kim Poong	— —	Park Eun-yeong; **Fabrizio Ferrari**
274	May 4	Kim Nam-il, Lee Dong-gook	**Joseph Lidgerwood**; Bae Kyung-jun	— —	Yoon Nam-no; **Kwon Sung-jun**
275	May 11	Kim Jae-joong, Choo Sung-hoon	Kim Poong; **Choi Hyun-seok**	— —	**Jang Keun-suk**; Han Li Guang
276	May 18	Kim Jae-joong, Choo Sung-hoon	Kwon Sung-jun; Son Jong-won	— —	**Antimo Maria Merone**; **Takada Yusuke**
277	May 25	Hoshi, Woozi, Mimi	**Kim Sohyi**; Kwon Sung-jun	— —	Fabrizio Ferrari; **Yoon Nam-no**
278	June 1	Hoshi, Woozi, Mimi	**Jung Ji-sun**; **Kim Poong**	— —	Im Tae-hoon; Jung Ho-young
279	June 8	Lee Sedol, Lee Chan-won	Kim Poong; Yoon Nam-no	— —	**Kwon Sung-jun**; **Jung Ji-sun**
280	June 15	Lee Sedol, Lee Chan-won	**Lu Chinglai**; Choi Hyun-seok	— —	Im Tae-hoon; **Fabrizio Ferrari**
281	June 22	Sunwoo Yong-nyeo, Lee Joon	**Choi Hyun-seok**; Fabrizio Ferrari	— —	Bae Kyung-jun; **Jung Ho-young**
282	June 29	Sunwoo Yong-nyeo, Lee Joon	Kwon Sung-jun; **Kim Poong**	— —	**Park Eun-yeong**; Yoon Nam-no
283	July 6	Doh Kyung-soo, Park Byung-eun	**Kim Poong**; Kwon Sung-jun	— —	Son Jong-won; **Yoon Nam-no**
284	June 13	Doh Kyung-soo, Park Byung-eun	**Jung Ho-young**; Choi Hyun-seok	— —	Sam Kim; **Jung Ji-sun**
285	July 20	Jin, Cho Sae-ho	**Choi Hyun-seok**; Yoon Nam-no	— —	Son Jong-won; **Edward Lee**
286	July 27	Jin, Cho Sae-ho	Kim Poong; **Im Tae-hoon**	— —	**Sam Kim**; Park Eun-yeong
287	August 3	Lim Yoona, Ahn Bo-hyun	Kwon Sung-jun; Kim Poong	— —	**Son Jong-won**; **Jung Ho-young**
288	August 10	Lim Yoona, Ahn Bo-hyun	Park Eun-yeong; **Choi Hyun-seok**	— —	**Yoon Nam-no**; Sam Kim
289	August 17	Car, the Garden, Pani Bottle	**Jung Ji-sun**; **Kim Poong**	— —	Son Jong-won; Choi Hyun-seok
290	August 24	Car, the Garden, Pani Bottle	**Jung Ho-young**; Sam Kim	— —	Yoon Nam-no; **Kwon Sung-jun**
291	August 31	Lee Young-ae, Kim Young-kwang	**Park Eun-yeong**; **Jung Ho-young**	— —	Son Jong-won; Sam Kim
292	September 7	Lee Young-ae, Kim Young-kwang	**Choi Hyun-seok**; **Kim Poong**	— —	Yoon Nam-no; Kwon Sung-jun
293	September 14	Chenle, Mark; Felix, Lee Know	Choi Hyun-seok	—	**Sam Kim**
293	September 14	Chenle, Mark; Felix, Lee Know	Kim Poong; Im Tae-hoon	—	**Jung Ji-sun**; **Park Eun-yeong**
294	September 21	Chenle, Mark; Felix, Lee Know	Kwon Sung-jun; Jung Ho-young	— —	**Yoon Nam-no**; **Son Jong-won**
295	September 28	Jo Woo-jin, Park Ji-hwan	Kim Poong; Park Eun-yeong	— —	**Jung Ho-young**; **Son Jong-won**
296	October 6	**Chuseok Special**; Lee Jae Myung, Kim Hea Kyung	Choi Hyun-seok; **Kim Poong**	— —	**Son Jong-won**; Jung Ji-sun
297	October 12	Jo Woo-jin, Park Ji-hwan	**Choi Hyun-seok**; **Im Tae-hoon**	— —	Kwon Sung-jun; Yoon Nam-no
298	October 19	Kwon Yul, Kim Jae-wook	**Park Eun-yeong**; **Choi Hyun-seok**	— —	Lu Chinglai; Jung Ho-young
299	October 26	Kwon Yul, Kim Jae-wook	**Sam Kim**	—	Fabrizio Ferrari
299	October 26	Kwon Yul, Kim Jae-wook	Kim Poong; Son Jong-won	—	**Yoon Nam-no**; **Kwon Sung-jun**
300	November 2	Kwaktube, Joo Woo-jae	**Kim Poong**; Sam Kim	— —	Yoon Nam-no; **Antimo Maria Merone**
301	November 9	Kwaktube, Joo Woo-jae	Jung Ho-young; Kwon Sung-jun	— —	**Son Jong-won**; **Park Eun-yeong**
302	November 23	Tzuyang, Haetnim	Kim Poong; **Sam Kim**	— —	**Kwon Sung-jun**; Son Jong-won
303	November 30	Tzuyang, Haetnim	Jung Ho-young; **Choi Hyun-seok**	— —	**Yoon Nam-no**; Park Eun-yeong
304	December 7	Hyun-jin Ryu, Shin-Soo Choo	Kwon Sung-jun; Kim Poong	— —	**Yoon Nam-no**; **Park Eun-yeong**
305	December 14	Hyun-jin Ryu, Shin-Soo Choo	Choi Hyun-seok; **Jung Ho-young**	— —	**Sam Kim**; Son Jong-won
306	December 21	**2025 Championship Special**; Kim Won-hun, Lee Soo-ji	**Playoffs Round 1**		
306	December 21	**2025 Championship Special**; Kim Won-hun, Lee Soo-ji	Son Jong-won	—	**Park Eun-yeong**
306	December 21	**2025 Championship Special**; Kim Won-hun, Lee Soo-ji	**Playoffs Round 2**		
306	December 21	**2025 Championship Special**; Kim Won-hun, Lee Soo-ji	**Park Eun-yeong**	—	Kim Poong
307	December 28	**2025 Championship Special**; Kim Won-hun, Lee Soo-ji	**Semifinal**		
307	December 28	**2025 Championship Special**; Kim Won-hun, Lee Soo-ji	**Park Eun-yeong**	—	Jung Ho-young
307	December 28	**2025 Championship Special**; Kim Won-hun, Lee Soo-ji	**Champions Match**		
307	December 28	**2025 Championship Special**; Kim Won-hun, Lee Soo-ji	Park Eun-yeong	—	**Choi Hyun-seok**

=== 2026 ===
Episodes 308–347

Episode #	Broadcast Date	Guests	Chefs' Cooking Matches		
308	January 4	Lee Min-jung, Yoo Ji-tae	**Son Jong-won**; Kim Poong	— —	Sam Kim; **Jung Ho-young**
309	January 11	Lee Min-jung, Yoo Ji-tae	**Choi Hyun-seok**; Yoon Nam-no	— —	Kwon Sung-jun; **Park Eun-yeong**
310	January 18	Kim Young-ok, Park Jun-myun	**Sam Kim**; Choi Hyun-seok	— —	Jung Ho-young; **Park Eun-yeong**
311	January 25	Kim Young-ok, Park Jun-myun	**Kim Poong**; Kwon Sung-jun	— —	Yoon Nam-no; **Son Jong-won**
312	February 1	**Chefs' Party + Lunar New Year Special**; Son Jong-won, Kim Poong	**Kwon Sung-jun**; Jung Ho-young	— —	Yoon Nam-no; **Kim Poong**
313	February 15	**Chefs' Party + Lunar New Year Special**; Son Jong-won, Kim Poong	**Sam Kim**; Son Jong-won	— —	Park Eun-yeong; **Choi Hyun-seok**
314	March 1	An Yu-jin, Park Jin-young	**Jung Ho-young**; Kwon Sung-jun	— —	Park Eun-yeong; **Son Jong-won**
315	March 8	An Yu-jin, Park Jin-young	**Sam Kim**; Kim Si-hyeon	— —	Choi Hyun-seok; **Kim Poong**
316	March 15	Choi Min-jeong, Kim Gil-li	**Son Jong-won**; Kim Poong	— —	Choi Hyun-seok; **Park Eun-yeong**
317	March 22	Nana, Kyuhyun	**Yoon Nam-no**; Kwon Sung-jun	— —	Park Eun-yeong; **Sam Kim**
318	March 29	Nana, Kyuhyun	**Choi Kang-rok**; Son Jong-won	— —	Jung Ho-young; **Kim Poong**
319	April 5	Tiffany Young, Hyoyeon	**Son Jong-won**; Edward Lee	— —	Sam Kim; **Park Eun-yeong**
320	April 12	Tiffany Young, Hyoyeon	**Choi Hyun-seok**; Yoon Nam-no	— —	Kim Poong; **Jung Ho-young**
321	April 19	Maggie Kang, Leejung Lee	Sam Kim, Jung Ho-young Park Eun-yeong, Kwon Sung-jun, Jung Ho-young	— —	**Choi Hyun-seok, Kim Poong** **Son Jong-won**
322	April 26	Go Soo, Lee Jong-hyuk	**Kwon Sung-jun**; Yoon Nam-no	— —	Choi Hyun-seok; **Sam Kim**
323	May 3	Go Soo, Lee Jong-hyuk	**Son Jong-won**; Jung Ho-young	— —	Park Eun-yeong; **Kim Poong**
324	May 10	Ko Woo-rim, Kangnam	**Son Jong-won**; Choi Hyun-seok	— —	Yoon Nam-no; **Sam Kim**
325	May 17	Ko Woo-rim, Kangnam	**Kwon Sung-jun**; Kim Poong	— —	Jung Ho-young; **Park Eun-yeong**
326	May 24	Shin Ye-eun, Lee Jun-young	**Choi Hyun-seok**; **Kwon Sung-jun**	— —	Yoon Nam-no; Kim Poong
327	May 31	Shin Ye-eun, Lee Jun-young	Sam Kim; **Son Jong-won**	— —	**Jung Ho-young**; Park Eun-yeong
328	June 7	Park Hang-seo, Choi Yong-soo	Son Jong-won; **Lee Moon-jung**	— —	**Kwon Sung-jun**; Park Eun-yeong
329	June 14	Park Hang-seo, Choi Yong-soo	Sam Kim; **Jung Ho-young**	— —	**Kim Poong**; Choi Hyun-seok
330	June 21	Namkoong Min, Kim Dae-myung	**Lee Moon-jung**; Yoon Nam-no	— —	Kim Poong; **Kwon Sung-jun**
331	June 28	Namkoong Min, Kim Dae-myung	Son Jong-won; **Choi Hyun-seok**	— —	**Jung Ho-young**; Sam Kim
332	July 5	Winter, Karina	**Sam Kim**; **Lee Moon-jung**	— —	Jung Ho-young; Kwon Sung-jun
333	July 12	Winter, Karina	Park Eun-yeong; **Choi Hyun-seok, Kim Seon-yeop**	— —	**Kim Poong**; Son Jong-won, Woo Do-hee
334	July 19	Jang Hang-jun, J.Y. Park	**Yoon Nam-no**; Park Eun-yeong, Lee Moon-jung	— —	Jung Ho-young; **Kwon Sung-jun, Choi Hyun-seok**
335	July 26	Jang Hang-jun, J.Y. Park	**Son Jong-won**; **Yoo Yong-wook**	— —	Sam Kim; Kim Poong
336	August 2	Choi Soo-young, Uhm Jung-hwa	**Kwon Sung-jun**; **Park Eun-yeong**	— —	Choi Hyun-seok; Yoon Nam-no
337	August 9	Choi Soo-young, Uhm Jung-hwa	Son Jong-won; Sam Kim, Jung Ho-young	— —	**Yoo Yong-wook**; **Kim Poong, Lee Moon-jung**
338	August 16	Cho Yeo-jeong, Ha Seok-jin	**Son Jong-won**; Kim Poong	— —	Yoon Nam-no; **Jung Ho-young**
339	August 23	Cho Yeo-jeong, Ha Seok-jin	Park Eun-yeong; Kwon Sung-jun	— —	**Choi Hyun-seok**; **Sam Kim**
340	August 30	**Siblings Special**; Bibi, Kim Na-Kyoung (TripleS), Jonathan Yiombi, Patricia Yiombi	Park Eun-yeong; **Son Jong-won**	— —	**Jung Ho-young**; Choi Hyun-seok
341	September 6	**Siblings Special**; Bibi, Kim Na-Kyoung (TripleS), Jonathan Yiombi, Patricia Yiombi	Kwon Sung-jun; **Kim Poong**	— —	**Yoon Nam-no**; Sam Kim
342	September 13	Son Ye-jin	**Choi Hyun-seok, Yoon Nam-no**; Son Jong-won	— —	Lee Moon-jung, Park Eun-yeong; **Kwon Sung-jun**
343	September 20	**Chuseok Special** Kwon Sung-jun, Yoon Nam-no	**Son Jong-won, Park Eun-yeong**; Choi Hyun-seok	— —	Kim Poong, Sam Kim **Jung Ho-young**
344	September 27	Joo Sang-wook, Chae Jung-an	Kwon Sung-jun; **Jung Ho-young**	— —	**Choi Hyun-seok**; Sam Kim
345	October 4	Joo Sang-wook, Chae Jung-an	Son Jong-won; **Yoon Nam-no**	— —	**Park Eun-yeong**; Kim Poong
346	October 11	Lee Seon-min, Code Kunst	Edward Lee; **Yoon Nam-no**	— —	**Sam Kim**; Park Eun-yeong
347	October 18	Lee Seon-min, Code Kunst	Kwon Sung-jun; **Son Jong-won**	— —	**Kim Poong**; Jung Ho-young
