= The Scent =

- Film poster
- Hangul: 간통을 기다리는 남자
- Hanja: 姦通을 기다리는 男子
- RR: Gantongeul gidarineun namja
- MR: Kant'ongŭl kidarinŭn namja
- Directed by: Kim Hyeong-jun
- Written by: Hwang Seong-gu; Kim Hyeong-jun
- Produced by: Choi Jun-yeong; Lee Min-ho
- Starring: Park Hee-soon; Park Si-yeon
- Cinematography: Choi Young-taek; Yun Tae-gi
- Edited by: Kim Sun-min
- Music by: Yuta
- Production company: Trophy Entertainment
- Distributed by: Showbox
- Release date: April 11, 2012
- Running time: 117 minutes
- Country: South Korea
- Language: Korean
- Box office: US$8.2 million

The Scent (Korean: 간통을 기다리는 남자; RR: Gantongeul gidarineun namja; lit. 'Man Who Waits for Adultery'; also shortened to 간기남; ganginam) is a 2012 South Korean comedy-thriller film starring Park Hee-soon and Park Si-yeon.

Kang Seon-woo is a detective specializing in adultery cases. One day, he investigates the scene of an incident only to find two dead bodies. The only witness is Kim Soo-jin, the dead man's wife. Seon-woo inadvertently become a primary suspect and struggles to prove his innocence.

== Plot ==
For the past two years, while on suspension for adultery with a police chief's wife, detective Kang Seon-woo (Park Hee-soon), has been running a private-eye agency specializing in adultery cases. He's also being sued for divorce by his wife, Hye-young (Cha Soo-yeon). A couple of days before resuming his old job, Seon-u accepts a case from a woman, Kim Soo-jin (Yoon Jae), who wears a particularly alluring perfume. She says her husband, casino billionaire Nam Yeong-gil (Jo Won-hee), is conducting an affair with another woman at a love hotel in Gapyeong, Gyeonggi Province, outside Seoul. Seon-woo checks into an adjoining room in the unmanned hotel and is met there by Soo-jin. Instead of immediately surprising the lovers, Soo-jin invites Seon-woo to a drink and seduces him. Seon-woo wakes up next to her dead body, and in the next room finds the husband also dead. The woman there says her name is also Kim Soo-jin (Park Si-yeon) and the dead man is her husband. Along with his idiot assistant, ex-con Gi-poong (Lee Kwang-soo), Seon-woo cleans the crime scenes and buries the bodies, realizing he's been framed for the double murder. Resuming his job at Jonggu Police Station, Seon-woo investigates the case along with two colleagues: the stubbornly procedural Seo (Kim Jung-tae), who dislikes him, and the easy-going Han Gil-ro (Joo Sang-wook), who admires him. Seon-woo has noticed that Soo-jin wears the same perfume as her dead namesake, and she admits she wanted a divorce from her husband, who used to beat her. Seon-woo questions the dead Soo-jin's boyfriend, gym trainer Lee Jin-guk (Kim Yun-seong), but the trail leads nowhere. As the terrier-like Seo comes up with more evidence that could eventually implicate Seon-woo in the murders, Seon-woo finds himself falling hard for Soo-jin and on a deadline to solve the mystery.

== Cast ==
- Park Hee-soon - Kang Seon-woo
- Park Si-yeon - Kim Soo-jin
- Joo Sang-wook - Detective Han Gil-ro
- Kim Jung-tae - Detective Seo
- Lee Han-wi - Chief detective Sa
- Lee Kwang-soo - Gi-poong
- Cha Soo-yeon - Hye-young
- Kim Yun-seong - Lee Jin-guk
- Jo Won-hee - Nam Yeong-gil
- Yoon Jae - the other Kim Soo-jin
- Kim Gyeong-ryong - Yangpyeong neighborhood association president
- Jeong Hyeong-seok - chief inspector at tribunal
- Shin Hyeon-tak - mud boy man
- Lydia Park - chief inspector at tribunal
- Jeon Soo-kyung - Chinese restaurant manageress
- Jang Hang-jun - Chinese restaurant boss
- Kim Jeong-hak - forensics officer

== Production ==
About her radical nude scene, Park Si-yeon said, "When I first got the script, there was no exposure scene and I did not know that I had to go naked in front of the camera until we started filming. It was tough as I have never done such thing before, but I had several heated discussions with the producer and my co-star Park Hee-soon about these scenes and we did it."

== Box office ==
Despite somewhat negative reception from film critics, the film performed strongly at the box office. In total the film sold 1,246,185 admissions nationwide, with the success of the film largely attributed to Park Si-yeon's numerous nude scenes.
