= Park Si-yeon =

South Korean actress (born 1979)

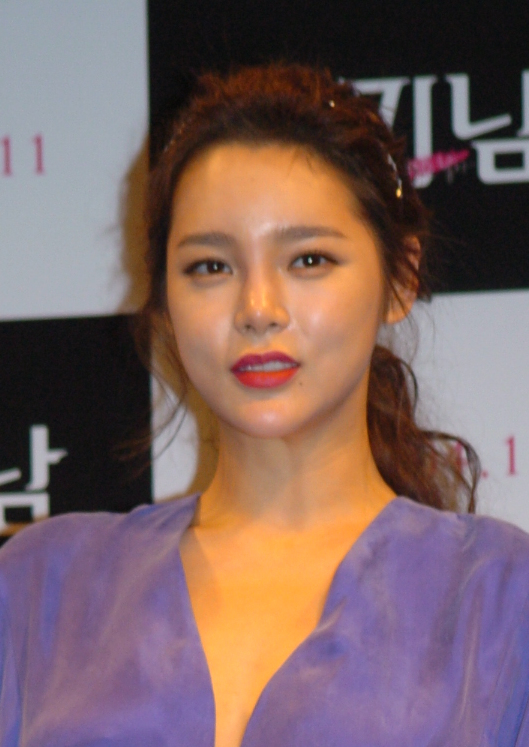
- Born: Park Mi-seon; March 29, 1979 (age 47); Busan, South Korea
- Occupation: Actress
- Years active: 2000–present
- Spouse: Park Sang-hun (m. 2011; div. 2016)
- Children: 2

Korean name
- Hangul: 박미선
- Hanja: 朴美宣
- RR: Bak Miseon
- MR: Pak Misŏn

Stage name
- Hangul: 박시연
- Hanja: 朴是沿
- RR: Bak Siyeon
- MR: Pak Siyŏn

Park Si-yeon (Korean: 박시연; born March 29, 1979), birth name Park Mi-seon, is a South Korean actress and beauty pageant titleholder. She joined the Miss Korea 2000 and used that as a springboard to an acting career, she made her acting debut in China in 2004 appeared in minor roles in several CCTV dramas. In 2005 Park was cast in her first starring role in the Korean drama My Girl, though at the time she was more known for dating actor-singer Eric Mun. As she built her filmography in the following years, Park overcame early criticism of her acting skills and eventually gained respect as an actress in TV series such as Bitter Sweet Life, Coffee House and The Innocent Man, as well as the films The Fox Family, A Love, and The Scent.

== Early life ==
Park Mi-seon was born in Busan, South Korea. As a child, Park displayed a talent for singing, saying, "When I was young, I used to be so shy that I cried when I was told to sing in front of my dad on the Lunar New Year. My mom ended up sending me to a singing academy, hoping it would help me get over my shyness, but the strange thing is that I couldn't sing in front of my mom but I wasn't nervous at all on stage." In 1990, the fifth grader won the top prize in a children's music contest on KBS.

Park began attending college in the United States in 1998, majoring in journalism at Long Island University. In 2000, she took a leave of absence from school and entered in the regional Miss Seoul beauty pageant, placing third, She then competed in the Miss Korea pageant and won the Hanju Travel Agency Award (6th place).

== Career ==
Though her parents initially opposed her pursuing acting, Park took profile pictures of herself and went to various talent agencies. Her profile photos were eventually handed over to a Chinese agency, and several auditions later, this led to Park making her acting debut in China. Using the stage name Park Si-yeon, she appeared in small roles in three CCTV dramas, and also landed an advertising contract with cosmetics company Enprani.

In 2005, Park made her acting debut in her native country of South Korea with the SBS TV drama My Girl, for which she received unanimously bad reviews. But Park continued to work, appearing in more dramas and making her film debut in the 2006 quirky comedy-horror-musical The Fox Family; gradually her acting showed marked improvement. At first constantly struggling to memorize her lines, Park has admitted that she became more relaxed in her approach to acting, and is able to "feel" her characters better. She became known for playing women who drove men to their destruction and misfortune: In the gangster film A Love, the lover of Park's character goes to prison after defending her, in the MBC drama Bitter Sweet Life, she was a gold-digging mistress with a lonely soul, in spy film parody Dachimawa Lee, she was a sexy agent, and in the KBS drama The Slingshot, she sacrifices herself and becomes the enemy's possession in exchange for her boyfriend's freedom. Park smilingly said, "I personally don't like femme fatales. Men should be happy because of women, not unhappy."

For the revival of Drama Special, Park played a bookstore employee who falls in love with a married man in Red Candy. Despite the difficulty of taking part in a one-act drama, Park took it on with her devoted trust in screenwriter Noh Hee-kyung, of whom she is a big fan. "I felt that I had to be in whatever she writes."

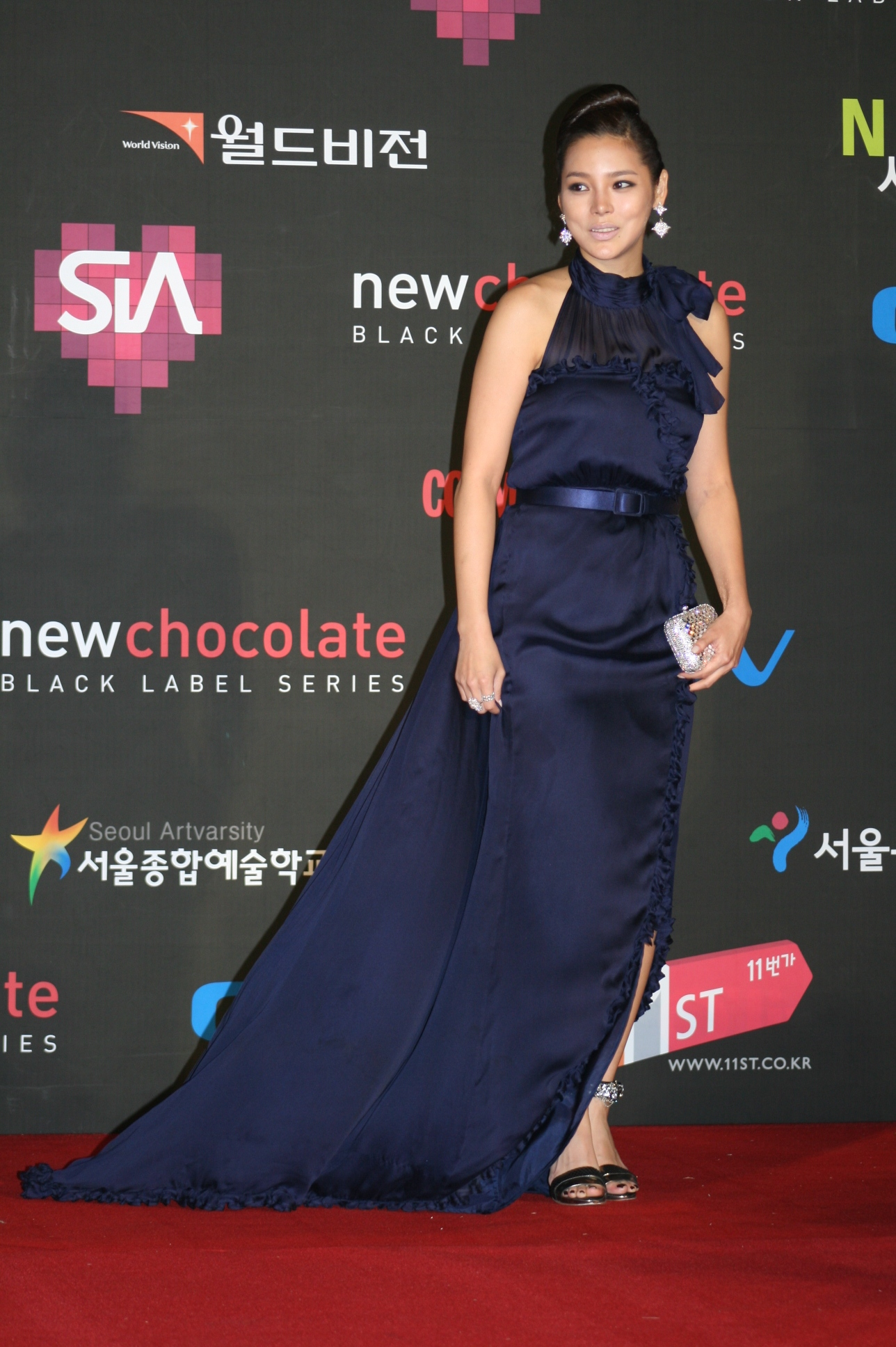
Park in 2009

In 2009, she joined the variety/reality show Family Outing, which features comedians and entertainers dealing with various aspects of rural life. But Park had to leave after six months due to a recurring injury she sustained while filming a previous project.

The series Coffee House was a welcome change for her; after having mainly taken on serious or dark characters, Park said she had been "dying to be in a romantic comedy." Describing Park as "extremely kind," director Pyo Min-soo said he incorporated her real-life personality in writing her character: a bright, cheerful, and caring career woman who at the same time is hardworking, frank and confident. Park said, "Honestly, this is the first time working has been this fun."

In 2010, U.S.-based Korean fashion company Moeim Style announced that Park would be the creative director for U.S. fashion brand TOUCH. As creative director, she oversaw the entire planning process, from design to distribution to production, of the brand's celebrity fashion line. The "celeb line" that she handled included the brands Tulle, Line & Dot, 213 and MK2K.

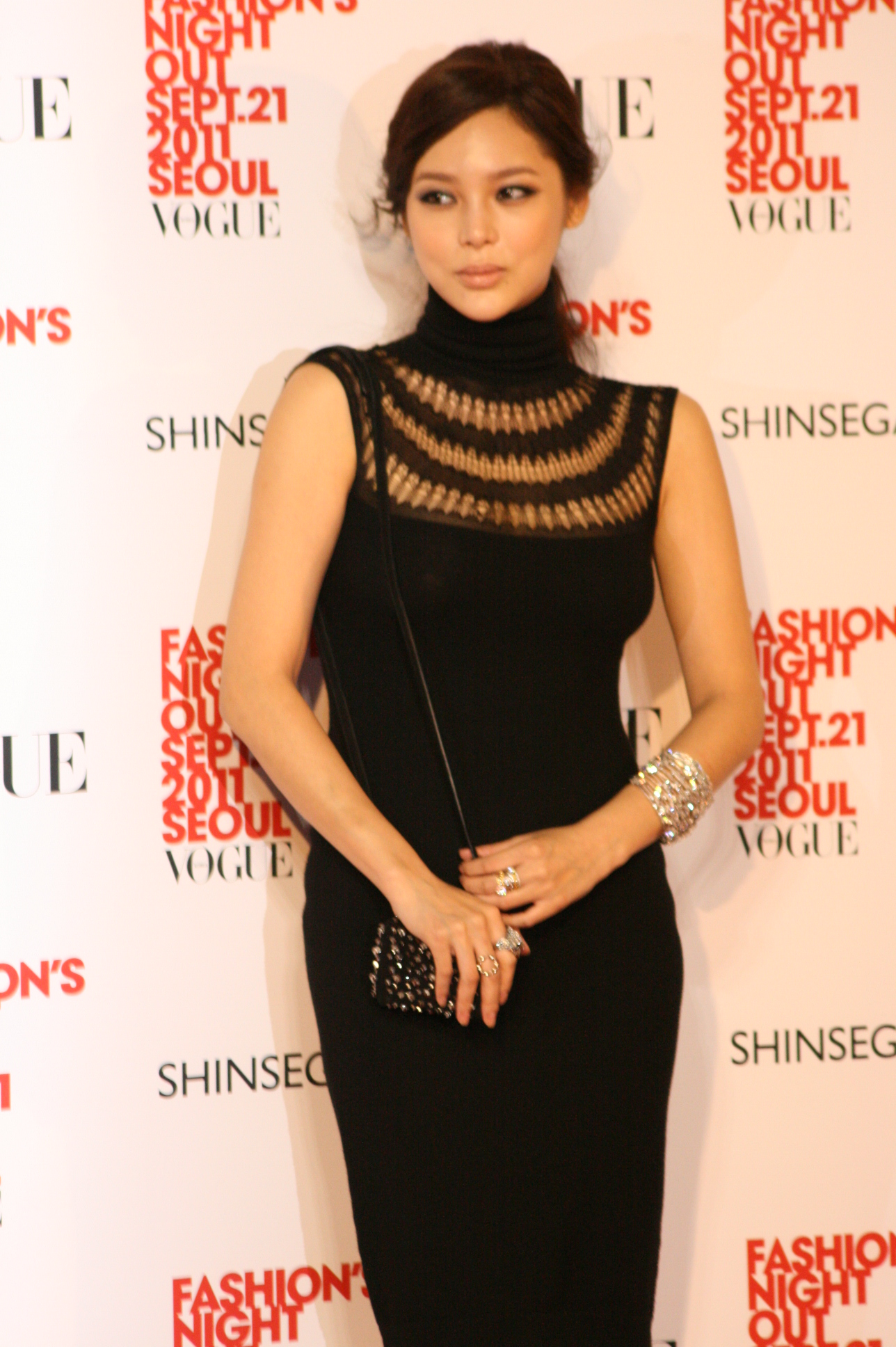
Park at the Vogue Fashion Night Out in 2011

For Christmas 2011, eight actors and actresses from Park's agency Didim531 (then known as Eyagi Entertainment) - including herself, Park Si-hoo, Cho Yeo-jeong and Nam Gyu-ri - recorded a song with no help from professional singers. The track, titled "Winter Story," is a cheerful tune based on the emotions that arise before a love confession, which is made against a winter backdrop. The song was released for sale online on December 5, 2011, and all profits from the song's sales went to charity.

Park made her comeback to the big screen after a two-year hiatus (her last film had been Marine Boy) in 2012's The Scent. She played a seductive woman who is the sole witness to the deaths of her husband and his mistress, whom the detective suspects is the killer yet is drawn to her mystique. Mesmerized while reading the script for the movie, Park said, "I am really excited that I get to play a character that is cool on the outside but is hurt and sad on the inside."

She then starred in the melodrama The Innocent Man, playing a woman who betrays her lover to serve her own ambition and puts him on the path to destructive revenge. Critics have credited Park's mature performance, saying she mastered the character's complicated nature in a way that heightened the tension of the story, and was not overshadowed by leading actors Song Joong-ki and Moon Chae-won.

After giving birth and being indicted for propofol use in 2013, Park returned to television with the 2014 cable drama The Greatest Marriage, in which her character struggles to balance single motherhood and a successful career as an anchorwoman.

In 2015, she made her Hollywood debut in Last Knights, an action film set in medieval times about a band of warriors who seek revenge on a corrupt emperor. She starred alongside Clive Owen, Morgan Freeman, and Korean veteran actor Ahn Sung-ki. With Japanese director Kazuaki Kiriya at the helm, filming took place in the Czech Republic.

In January 2022, it was reported that Park's contract with agency Mystic Story had ended.

== Personal life ==
=== Relationships ===
Park first became known to the Korean public not through her acting roles, but as the girlfriend of popular singer-actor Eric Mun (from K-pop boy band Shinhwa), whom she began dating in 2004. Her relationship with Mun overshadowed her acting career during her early years, with the public commonly identifying her as "Eric's girlfriend". In an interview with The Korea Herald, Park said it took about 10 different roles before the tag of "Eric's girlfriend" vanished from the public's perception of her, adding that the only positive of the tag was that she loved him. The couple broke up in 2007.

In an August 2010 interview with Cosmopolitan, Park said, "These days the thing I most think about is, 'Have I lived well?' I'm happy when I film dramas or movies, but in this kind of life you should turn back and take stock of your life at least once, and I think that time has come. I want to love. I want to marry soon and live boisterously."

On November 19, 2011, at the Seoul Hyatt Hotel, Park married Park Sang-hun, an office worker at a small company. She gave birth to their first child, a daughter, on September 24, 2013. Their second child, also a daughter, was born on November 14, 2015. In May 2016, it was announced that the couple filed for divorce.

=== Legal issues ===
In early 2013, Park was among the celebrities investigated then indicted for illegal use of propofol; Park's agency denied the allegations, saying she took the drug for medical reasons after she injured her back doing action scenes for the films Marine Boy and Dachimawa Lee. During the trial, her doctor testified that she had been taking the drug to treat avascular necrosis at the head of her femur. In October 2013, the Seoul Central District Court found Park guilty of taking propofol 400-500 times over four-and-a-half years (or 8.2 times a month), and she was sentenced to eight months in prison, suspended for two years.

On January 19, 2021, Park was booked by the police for driving under influence when the car she was driving hit the back bumper of another vehicle.

== Filmography ==
=== Television ===
Year	Title	Role
2004	Feng Qiu Huang	Zhuo Wenjun
2005	Han Xue Bao Ma	Gui Shou
2005	Lotus Lantern	San Sheng Mu
2005	My Girl	Kim Se-hyun
2006	Please Come Back, Soon-ae	flight attendant on last airplane
2006	Yeon Gaesomun	Cheon Gwan-nyeo
2006	Hyena	Soo-mi
2007	When Spring Comes	Oh Yeong-joo
2008	On Air	Herself (cameo, episode 3)
2008	Bitter Sweet Life	Hong Da-ae
2009	The Slingshot	Seo Kyung-ah
2010	KBS Drama Special: "Red Candy"	Yoo-hee
2010	Coffee House	Seo Eun-young
2011	The Greatest Love	Kim Hee-jin (cameo, episodes 3–4)
2012	The Innocent Man	Han Jae-hee
2014	The Greatest Marriage	Cha Gi-young
2016	Fantastic	Baek Sul
2018	Should We Kiss First?	Baek Ji-min
2020	When My Love Blooms	Jang Seo-kyung
2020	Birthcare Center	Han Hyo-rin (cameo, episode 4)

=== Film ===
Year	Title	Role
2006	The Fox Family	Fox daughter #1
2007	Zigzag Love	Ra-young
2007	A Love	Mi-ju
2008	Dachimawa Lee	Ma-ri
2008	Marine Boy	Choi Yu-ri
2012	The Scent	Kim Soo-jin
2015	Last Knights	Hannah
TBA	The Mujeogang	Han In-sook

=== Variety shows ===
Year	English title	Notes/Ref.
2009	Family Outing	Main Cast
2017	Guesthouse Daughters	Main Cast
2018	Alien Mom, Alien Dad	Host

=== Music video appearances ===
Year	Song title	Artist
2005	"Habit"	Woo Soo
2006	"Untouchable" [Part 1]	Big 4 (SG Wannabe, Kim Jong-kook, M to M)
2006	"Gone With the Wind" [Part 2]	Big 4 (SG Wannabe, Kim Jong-kook, M to M)
2007	"My Heart Cannot Go On Like This Any Longer"	MC the Max
2009	"After Love"	Park Hyo-shin
2011	"Amazed"	K.Will feat. Supreme Team's Simon Dominic and Sistar's Hyolyn
2011	"Rainy Season"	Choi Jung-in
2011	"No More Perfume on You"	Teen Top

== Awards and nominations ==
Year	Award	Category	Nominated work	Result
2000	Miss Seoul Pageant	—N/a	—N/a	3rd place
2006	27th Blue Dragon Film Awards	Best New Actress	The Fox Family	Nominated
2006	SBS Drama Awards	New Star Award	My Girl	Won
2007	43rd Baeksang Arts Awards	Best New Actress (Film)	The Fox Family	Won
2007	43rd Baeksang Arts Awards	Best New Actress (TV)	When Spring Comes	Nominated
2007	28th Blue Dragon Film Awards	Best Supporting Actress	A Love	Nominated
2007	27th Korean Association of Film Critics Awards	Best New Actress	A Love	Won
2008	5th Max Movie Awards	Best Supporting Actress	A Love	Nominated
2008	29th Blue Dragon Film Awards	Best Supporting Actress	Dachimawa Lee	Nominated
2009	KBS Drama Awards	Excellence Award, Actress in a Mid-length Drama	The Slingshot	Nominated
2009	KBS Drama Awards	Netizen Award, Actress	The Slingshot	Nominated
2009	KBS Drama Awards	Best Couple Award with Park Yong-ha	The Slingshot	Nominated
2010	SBS Drama Awards	Excellence Award, Actress in a Special Planning Drama	Coffee House	Nominated
2010	KBS Drama Awards	Best Actress in a One-Act Drama/Special	Red Candy	Nominated
2012	KBS Drama Awards	Excellence Award, Actress in a Mid-length Drama	The Innocent Man	Nominated
2012	KBS Drama Awards	Netizen Award, Actress	The Innocent Man	Nominated
2018	SBS Drama Awards	Excellence Award, Actress in a Monday-Tuesday Drama	Should We Kiss First	Nominated
