= Alien Mom, Alien Dad =

2018 South Korean television program

- Hangul: 엄마 아빠는 외계인
- Lit.: Mom and Dad Are Aliens
- RR: Eomma appaneun oegyein
- MR: Ŏmma appanŭn oegyein
- Genre: Reality television
- Written by: Lee Ji-yeong, Seong Mi-jeong, Hwang Soo-yeon, Yoo Hye-jin, Lee Yeong-kyeong, Baek Seol-ah, Lee Seung-hyun
- Directed by: Lee Sae-hui
- Starring: Current: Oh Kwang-rok & Oh Si-won; Kim Woo-ri, Kim Ye-rin & Kim Ye-eun; Hwang Shin-hye & Lee Jin-yi; Former: Kim Sung-kyung & Choi Alex MCs: Kim Yong-man; Park Si-yeon; Ji Sang-ryeol; Yang Jae-woong
- Country of origin: South Korea
- Original language: Korean
- No. of episodes: 6

Production
- Producers: Park Ji-ah, Park Yeong-mi, Heo Hye-jin, Jo Jae-yeong, Jo Ahn-ram, Kim Ji-eun, Park Bo-kyeong, Ko Geun-yong, Oh Jeong-hoon, Lee Keon
- Production location: South Korea
- Running time: 80 minutes
- Production company: KBS

Original release
- Network: KBS2, KBS World
- Release: 31 July – 4 September 2018

Alien Mom, Alien Dad (Korean: 엄마 아빠는 외계인) is a South Korean television entertainment program, where celebrities, who are known for their unique personalities, show their daily lives which their children respond and react to.

== Broadcasting period ==
Broadcasting period	Airtime	Duration
31 July 2018 – 4 September 2018	Tuesday at 11:10pm – 12:30am	80 minutes

== Cast ==
Duration	Parent (occupation)	Child(ren)	Notes
2018; Episodes 1–2, 4–6	Oh Kwang-rok (actor)	Son: Oh Si-won	
2018; Episodes 1, 3–6	Kim Woo-ri (stylist)	Daughter: Kim Ye-rin	
2018; Episodes 1, 3–6	Kim Woo-ri (stylist)	Daughter: Kim Ye-eun	
2018; Episodes 2–6	Hwang Shin-hye (actress)	Daughter: Lee Jin-yi	
Duration	MCs		
2018; Episodes 1–6	Kim Yong-man		
2018; Episodes 1–6	Park Si-yeon		
2018; Episodes 1–6	Ji Sang-ryeol		
2018; Episodes 1–6	Yang Jae-woong (psychiatrist)		

=== Former cast ===
Duration	Parent (occupation)	Child(ren)	Notes
2018; Episodes 1–2	Kim Sung-kyung (announcer)	Son: Choi Alex (Choi Jung-tae)	

=== Special cast ===
Duration	Parent (occupation)	Child(ren)	Notes
2018; Episodes 3	Kim Gu-ra (comedian)	Son: MC Gree (Kim Dong-hyeon)	

=== Guest appearances ===
List of guest appearances

Guests	Episode(s)
Won Dong-yeon	2
Park Na-rae (via video call)	3
Park Ho-san	4
Lee Min-woo (Shinhwa)	5
Eddy Kim	6

== Ratings ==
=== 2018 ===
List of ratings (episode 1–6)

Episode	Date	AGB Nielsen Ratings
1	31 July	2.4%
2	7 August	2.7%
3	14 August	2.4%
4	21 August	2.3%
5	28 August	2.3%
6	4 September	1.7%
