= Tough as Iron =

- Theatrical poster
- Directed by: Ahn Gwon-tae
- Written by: Ahn Gwon-tae
- Produced by: Baek Sun-hee; Lee Min-ho; Han Seong-gu; Kang Woo-suk
- Starring: Yoo Ah-in; Kim Hae-sook
- Cinematography: Lee Hyung-deok
- Edited by: Kim Sun-min
- Music by: Jo Yeong-wook
- Production companies: Popcorn Film; The Dream&Pictures; Cinema Service
- Distributed by: CJ Entertainment
- Release date: October 2, 2013
- Running time: 108 minutes
- Country: South Korea
- Language: Korean
- Box office: US$7.9 million

Tough as Iron (Korean: 깡철이; RR: Kkangcheori) is a 2013 South Korean action drama film written and directed by Ahn Gwon-tae, starring Yoo Ah-in and Kim Hae-sook in the title role.

== Plot ==
Gang Cheol (whose name means "iron" in Korean) was once a legendary street gangster in Busan, but he put away his fists and cleaned up his act for the sake of his mother Soon-i, who has dementia. Things are going well for him; he now works as a stevedore at a loading dock and is pursuing a relationship with Soo-ji, a free-spirited woman from Seoul vacationing in the port city. But Soon-i is diagnosed with kidney failure and needs an expensive organ transplant that he cannot afford. Knowing that Cheol is desperate for money, local gang leader Sang-gon proposes that Cheol come work for him and his brother Hwi-gon. At first Cheol refuses, but when his debt-ridden best friend Jong-soo gives the deed to Cheol's house to Sang-gon as collateral for a private loan, he's left with no choice but to get dragged back into Busan's criminal underworld. Cheol is ordered to kill a visiting Japanese Yakuza boss whose death will enable Sang-gon's ascension within the Korean branch of the mob organization.

== Cast ==
- Yoo Ah-in as Gang Cheol
- Kim Hae-sook as Kim Soon-i
- Kim Jung-tae as Sang-gon
- Kim Sung-oh as Hwi-gon
- Jung Yu-mi as Jo Soo-ji
- Lee Si-eon as Jong-soo
- Shin Jung-geun as Yagami
- Bae Seul-ki as Go Jae-sook
- Jang Tae-sung as Lee Byeong-hee
- Kim Byeong-seo as Poloti
- Kim Seo-kyeong as Chyurining
- Choi Young-sung as Adidas
- Song Young-chang as Hwan-gyu
- Kim Hyun-sook as Organ broker
- Go In-beom as Police substation captain
- Lee Jeong-heon as Director of internal medicine department

== Release ==
Tough as Iron opened in South Korean theaters on October 2, 2013. It grossed US$7,889,145 on 1,209,363 admissions.

It also received a limited theatrical release in the United States (October 11, 2013) and Japan (May 2014).
