= Six-Party Talks (TV series) =

- Genre: Talk-variety
- Starring: Lee Kyung-kyu; Kim Yong-man; Park Myung-soo; Kim Hee-chul; Jang Dong-min; Jang Do-yeon
- Country of origin: South Korea
- Original language: Korean
- No. of episodes: 4

Production
- Running time: 80 minutes

Original release
- Network: KBS2
- Release: February 5 – February 26, 2019

Six-Party Talks (Korean: 6자회담) is a variety show program that was aired by KBS2. Originally, the pilot was formed, but the regular formation was canceled.

== Broadcast time ==
Broadcast period	Airtime		Remark
February 5–26, 2019	1	Tuesday 23:10 – 23:50	Pilot
February 5–26, 2019	2	Tuesday 23:50 – 00:30	Pilot

== List of episodes and Ratings ==
Episode	Air Date	Rating
Episode	Air Date	Nationwide
1	February 5, 2019	1.8%
1	February 5, 2019	2.5%
2	February 12, 2019	1.9%
2	February 12, 2019	2.6%
3	February 19, 2019	2.3%
3	February 19, 2019	2.3%
4	February 26, 2019	2.2%
4	February 26, 2019	2.3%
