= Lee Si-eon =

South Korean actor

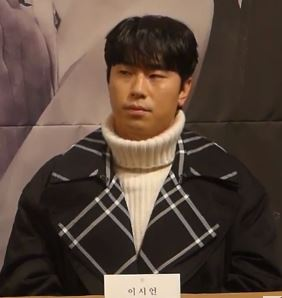
- Lee in December 2019
- Born: Lee Bo-yeon; July 3, 1982 (age 44); Mora-dong, Buk-gu, Busan, South Korea (Currently Mora-dong, Sasang-gu, Busan, South Korea)
- Other name: Lee Shi-un
- Education: Seoul Institute of the Arts – Broadcasting and Entertainment
- Occupation: Actor
- Years active: 2009–present
- Agent: Story J Company
- Spouse: Seo Ji-seung (m. 2021)
- Children: 1

Korean name
- Hangul: 이보연
- Hanja: 李普淵
- RR: I Boyeon
- MR: I Poyŏn

Stage name
- Hangul: 이시언
- Hanja: 李施彦
- RR: I Sieon
- MR: I Siŏn

Lee Si-eon (born Lee Bo-yeon on July 3, 1982) is a South Korean actor and television personality. He is best known for his comic supporting role in the popular campus drama Reply 1997. He is also known for being a cast member of MBC's popular reality TV show I Live Alone until his departure in December 2020.

== Early life and education ==
After graduating from high school in Busan and completing his military service, Lee Si-eon moved to Seoul. In 2005, Lee enrolled in the Broadcasting and Entertainment Department at the Seoul Institute of the Arts, joining a cohort that included Kim Seon-ho from the same department, as well as Kwon Hyuk-soo and Lee Dong-hwi from theater department.

== Career ==
Lee made his television debut in the 2009 drama Friend, Our Legend. He later revealed that the media had initially misreported that a female actress had been cast in his role due to his birth name, Lee Bo-yeon. The drama's director, Kwak Kyung-taek, gave him the stage name "Lee Si-eon" after consulting a naming agency. He continues to use the name throughout his career. He went on to appear in dramas such as Warrior Baek Dong-soo (2011) and The King 2 Hearts (2012).

Lee had his breakthrough with his comic supporting role as Bang Sung-jae in the tvN drama Reply 1997, the first installment of the Reply series created by Shin Won-ho and Lee Woo-jung. His character was known as the "one-man rumor mill" of the group. The series achieved both commercial and critical success, sparking a retro craze in South Korea.

Following the drama's success, on September 15, 2012, Lee, along with co-stars Seo In-guk, Eun Ji-won, and Shin So-yul, hosted an episode of Saturday Night Live Korea, which featured parodies of scenes from their series. A special program on tvN's enews was also aired on September 20, 2012, providing behind-the-scenes footage and bloopers from the set.

He also appeared in the films Tough as Iron (2013) and My Love, My Bride (2014), as well as dramas including Modern Farmer (2014), and Remember - War of the Son (2015).

In 2015, Lee expressed interest in joining the variety show Real Men, citing his experience as a drill instructor during his mandatory military service. He was subsequently invited to participate in the Real Man Manly Men special in November 2016.

Lee was cast in a supporting role in the drama W: Two Worlds, which aired on MBC from July 20 to September 14, 2016. The series explores the intersection of two realms: the real world and an alternate universe within a webtoon, from which it derives its title. Lee portrayed Park Soo-bong, an apprentice to webtoon artist Oh Seong-moo and a confidant of his daughter, Yeon-joo. W received acclaim for its innovative premise, achieving ratings of 11.63% and topping viewership ratings in its time slot throughout its run. Following the success of W, Lee joined the cast of the MBC reality show I Live Alone in September 2016.

He went on to appear in the dramas Man to Man (2017), Into the New World (2017), and Two Cops (2017). Lee credited I Live Alone for helping him land his role in drama Live, noting that writer Noh Hee-kyung cast him after watching him on the reality show. She had initially disliked his acting style, but after seeing him watch TV during an episode, she thought he resembled the character Kang Nam-il. Lee expressed his gratitude for the affection he received through the show, noting that it helped him show a new side of himself as an actor.

== Personal life ==
Lee has been in a relationship with actress Seo Ji-seung since 2017. On November 8, 2021, it was reported that Lee would be getting married in a private ceremony on December 25, 2021, in Jeju. Later that same day, Lee's agency confirmed the report. On May 22, 2026, the couple welcomed their first child, a son.

== Filmography ==
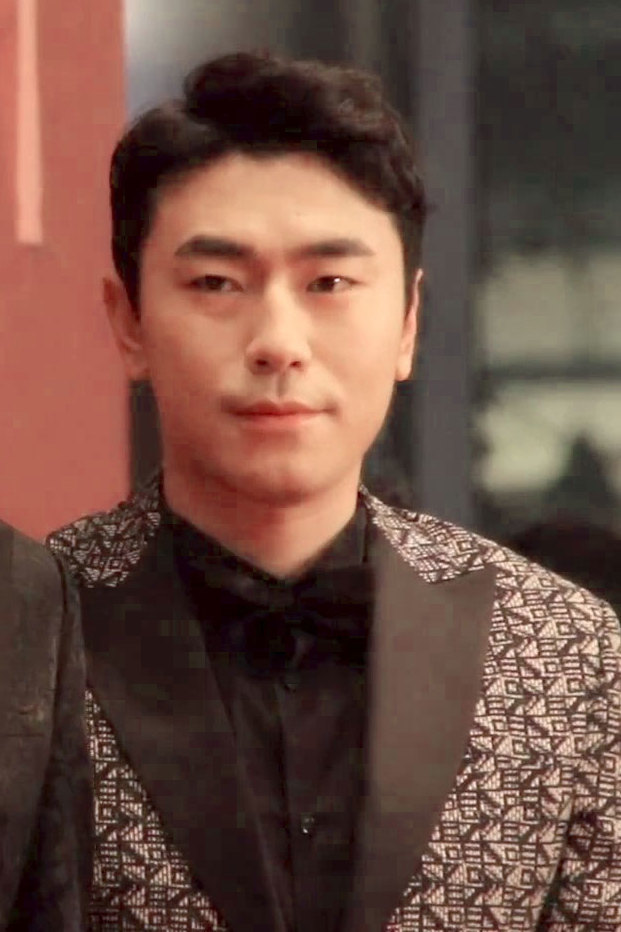
Lee at the 2017 MBC Drama Awards

=== Film ===
Year	Title	Role
2001	Kick the Moon	bit part
2011	Children...	PD Yoon
2011	Perfect Game	senior member of national team/MBC Baseball player (cameo)
2013	Tough as Iron	Jong-soo
2014	My Love, My Bride	Ki-tae
2019	Race to Freedom: Um Bok Dong	Lee Hong-dae
2019	Killed My Wife	Chae Jung-ho
2020	Search Out	Sung-min
2024	Pilot	Captain from the air force (cameo)

=== Television series ===
Year	Title	Role	Network	Notes/Ref.
2009	Friend, Our Legend	Kim Joong-ho	MBC	
2010	Dr. Champ	Heo Taek-woo	SBS	
2011	Paradise Ranch	Secretary Lee	SBS	
2011	Warrior Baek Dong-soo	Daeheung	SBS	
2011–12	Bolder By the Day	Wang Sung-han	MBN	
2012	The King 2 Hearts	Kim Hang-ah's first love	MBC	
2012	Reply 1997	Bang Sung-jae	tvN	
2012–13	Seoyoung, My Daughter	Choi Ho-jung's blind date	KBS2	Cameo
2013	Don't Look Back: The Legend of Orpheus	Kim Dong-soo	KBS2	
2013	The Strange Cohabitation	Gwang-hyun	KBS2	Drama Special
2013	Reply 1994	Bang Sung-jae	tvN	Cameo (Ep. 16)
2013	Eun-guk and the Ugly Duckling	Eun-guk	KBS2	Drama Special
2013	Jin Jin	Kim Kyung-chul	KBS2	Drama Special
2014	The Noblesse	Yoon Shin-joong	JTBC	
2014	Modern Farmer	Yoo Han-cheol	SBS	
2014	Righteous Love		tvN	Cameo
2015	Kill Me, Heal Me	Park Min-jae	MBC	
2015	Hogu's Love	Shin Chung-jae	tvN	
2015	Beating Again	Oh Woo-sik	JTBC	
2015	Webtoon Hero Toondra Show	Text of the Joseon Dynasty	MBC Every 1	
2015–16	Remember	Section Chief Ahn	SBS	
2016	W	Park Soo-bong	MBC	
2017	Three Color Fantasy - The Universe's Star	Grim Reaper	MBC	
2017	Innocent Defendant		SBS	Cameo (Ep. 18)
2017	Good Manager	Prosecutor Park Yong-tae	KBS2	Cameo (Ep. 20)
2017	Whisper	young Kang Yoo-taek	SBS	
2017	Man to Man	Ji Se-hoon	JTBC	
2017	My Sassy Girl	Bang Se-ho	SBS	
2017	Reunited Worlds	Shin Ho-bang	SBS	
2017	Man in the Kitchen	Bong Myung-tae	MBC	
2017	Two Cops	Yong-pal	MBC	
2017	I'm Not a Robot		MBC	Cameo
2018	Live	Kang Nam-il	tvN	
2018	High-End Crush	Section chief Heo	MBN	Web Drama
2018	Player	Lim Byung-min	OCN	
2019	Welcome to Waikiki 2	a reporter	JTBC	Cameo (Ep. 3)
2019	Abyss	Park Dong-cheol	tvN	
2019	Hotel del Luna	an astronaut	tvN	Cameo (Ep. 3)
2019–20	Queen: Love and War	Wal	TV Chosun	
2020	Dinner Mate	Food truck operator	MBC	Cameo (Ep. 3)
2020	Men Are Men	Oh Jak-ga	KBS2	Cameo
2020	Cheat on Me If You Can	Jang Seung-cheol	KBS2	
2021	The Penthouse: War in Life 2	Detective	SBS	Cameo (Ep. 6)
2021	Racket Boys	Busan Citizen	SBS	Cameo (Ep.9)
2022	Crazy Love	Kang Min / Kim Cha-bae	KBS2	
2022	Café Minamdang	Yeo Chul-pal	KBS2	Cameo (Ep.2)
2022	Bad Prosecutor	Go Joong-do	KBS2	

=== Television shows ===
Year	Title	Role	Notes/Ref.
2016	Real Men	Cast member	Manly Men special
2016–2020	I Live Alone	Cast member	
2022	Adventure by Accident	Cast member	with Kian84 and Pani Bottle
2023	You Go to Sydney	Cast member	with Heo Sung-tae, Ahn Bo-hyun and Kwak Tube
2023-2024	Adventure by Accident 3	Cast member	with Kian84, Pani Bottle, and Dex
2025	Adventure by Accident 4	Cast member	with Kian84, Pani Bottle, and Dex

=== Music video appearances ===
Year	Song title	Artist	Ref.
2012	"Have, Don't Have"	Dal Shabet	

== Theater ==
Year	English title	Korean title	Role	Ref.
2021	The Perfect Other	완벽한 타인		
2022	Then and Today	그때도 오늘	Moon-suk	

== Awards and nominations ==
Year	Award	Category	Nominated work	Result
2016	SBS Drama Awards	Special Award, Actor in a Genre Drama	Remember	Nominated
2016	MBC Drama Awards	Best New Actor	W	Nominated
2016	MBC Drama Awards	Best Couple Award (with Kim Eui-sung)	W	Nominated
2016	MBC Entertainment Awards	Male Rookie Award in Variety Show	I Live Alone, Real Men (Season 2)	Nominated
2017	MBC Entertainment Awards	Rookie Award, Variety Category	I Live Alone	Won
2017	MBC Drama Awards	Golden Acting Award, Actor in a Monday-Tuesday Drama	Two Cops	Nominated
2017	SBS Drama Awards	Best Supporting Actor	Reunited Worlds	Nominated
2019	19th MBC Entertainment Awards	Top Excellence Award in Variety Category (Male)	I Live Alone	Nominated
2019	19th MBC Entertainment Awards	Best Teamwork Award	I Live Alone	Won
2020	20th MBC Entertainment Awards	Top Excellence Award in Variety Category – male	I Live Alone	Nominated
