= Marine Boy (film) =

- Theatrical poster
- Directed by: Yoon Jong-seok
- Written by: Yoon Jong-seok
- Produced by: Won Dong-yeon; Kim Ho-seong; Lee Sang-yong
- Starring: Kim Kang-woo; Cho Jae-hyun; Park Si-yeon
- Cinematography: Kim Ji-yong
- Edited by: Steve M. Choe; Kim Chang-ju
- Music by: Jung Jae-il
- Production company: REALies pictures
- Distributed by: CJ Entertainment
- Release date: 5 February 2009
- Running time: 118 minutes
- Country: South Korea
- Language: Korean
- Box office: US$3,923,970

Marine Boy (Korean: 마린보이; RR: Marin boi) is a 2009 South Korean action thriller film. The feature film debut of writer and director Yoon Jong-seok, it stars Kim Kang-woo, Cho Jae-hyun and Park Si-yeon in the lead roles. Marine Boy is the story of a former national swimmer who finds himself in debt, and out of desperation is employed as a mule by a gangster boss, smuggling drugs by sea. Yoon regarded the film's title as a unique point, saying, "There is something beguiling about its duality, how these criminals are called something that romantically calls to mind the popular cartoon Marine Boy or the star swimmer Park Tae-Hwan".

== Plot ==
Former national swimmer Cheon-soo dreams of traveling to Palau, and to fund his trip he works as a swimming instructor by day while gambling at night. But after losing a game of poker he finds himself heavily in debt and a trouble with the loan sharks. Kang, the head of a local drugs syndicate, offers to pay off Cheon-soo's debts; in return, Cheon-soo must work as a "marine boy", a mule who smuggles drugs across the open waters.

Knowing the danger he faces, Cheon-soo tries to make a run for it, but is arrested at the airport by police detective Kim Gae-ko. Kim is intent on capturing Kang and faced with no other choice, Cheon-soo agrees to work as a spy on his behalf. His situation becomes further complicated when he falls for Yu-ri, a jazz singer under Kang's charge and the daughter of Kang's best friend. But Yu-ri suspects Kang of killing her father, and she and Cheon-soo plot to take the drug money for themselves.

== Cast ==
- Kim Kang-woo as Cheon-soo
- Cho Jae-hyun as Company president Kang
- Park Si-yeon as Yu-ri
- Lee Won-jong as Detective Kim Gae-ko
- Um Hyo-sup as Section chief Jo
- Oh Dae-hwan as Coach Lee
- Choi Su-rin as Jazz bar owner
- Yoo Ji-yeon as House Madame
- Park Byung-eun as Ji-ho
- Im Hyeong-gook as Choi Do-wook
- Jo Jae-yoon as Department Head Im
- Kim Joon-bae as Company president Hwang
- Oh Kwang-rok as Doctor Park
- Choi Jung-woo as Gambling man
- Hakuryu as Suzuki

== Production ==
Marine Boy was the debut feature film by writer and director Yoon Jong-seok. Yoon said that he first began thinking about the story after watching a "very moving film noir", which inspired the type of characters he would later write into his script. During casting, he was keen to avoid stereotypes, and for the role of Kang wanted someone who looked more like a businessman than a typical gangster boss, choosing Cho Jae-hyun for that reason. Lead actor Kim Kang-woo had to overcome his fear of water and prepared for his role by undergoing three months of intensive training, which began with learning basic swimming strokes in a pool and progressed to more advanced skills such as scuba diving. Kim went on to film dangerous water sequences without using a stunt double, earning praise from his fellow cast members and the production crew. For her role as a jazz singer, Park Si-yeon received vocal training to improve her performance.

Filming commenced in Seoul on 17 May 2008 with scenes of Cheon-soo and Yu-ri's first meeting, and later moved to Cebu Island in the Philippines. The film's production went through much trial and error due to the crew's lack of experience of filming at sea, and both crew members and actors suffered severe seasickness during filming. From the initial draft of the script in 2004 to the end of production, Marine Boy took more than four years to complete.

== Release ==
Marine Boy was released in South Korea on 5 February 2009 and topped the domestic box office on its opening weekend with 415,360 admissions. As of 8 March, the film had accumulated a total of 833,696 admissions, and as of 22 March had grossed a total of US$3,923,970. Marine Boy was not regarded as a "big hit"; this has been attributed to the release of two other Korean thrillers—The Scam and Handphone—during the same month, placing the three films in competition with each other. Distribution rights for the film in Turkey were sold at the 59th Berlin International Film Festival, and it was one of three Korean films to be screened at the 12th Spring Showcase of the Hawaii International Film Festival.

== Critical response ==
Lee Hyo-won of The Korea Times was critical of Marine Boy for feeling "too Hollywood at times, with expensive cars crashing and featuring straight-to-bed romances", and noted that the film's middle section felt slow after a "fast paced and highly engrossing" beginning. However, Lee praised Cho Jae-hyun for portraying Kang "with ferocious naturalness and surprising tenderness", and credited supporting cast members Lee Won-jong and Oh Kwang-rok for giving the film substance.
