= Kim Yong-man (comedian) =

South Korean comedian (born 1967)

- Born: November 30, 1967 (age 58); Seoul, South Korea
- Spouse: Lee Nam-jeong (m. 1998)
- Children: 1

Comedy career
- Years active: 1991–2013; 2015–present
- Medium: Stand-up, television
- Genres: Observational, Sketch, Wit, Parody, Slapstick, Dramatic, Sitcom

Korean name
- Hangul: 김용만
- RR: Gim Yongman
- MR: Kim Yongman

Kim Yong-man (Korean: 김용만; born November 30, 1967) is a South Korean comedian. He is currently signed with the entertainment agency, FNC Entertainment.

== Education ==
In 2005, Kim was a student at Sungkyunkwan University's School of Art where he aimed to improve his acting skills for his sitcom, Nonstop 5, having previously studied at Seoul Institute of the Arts in 1992.

== Career ==
In 1991, Kim won the Grand Prize in the National College Comedy Contest, making his official debut in the South Korean entertainment industry. In the early 1990s, Kim was a part of a group of comedians who called themselves Team Potato (Korean: 감자골), composed of Kim Gook-jin, Kim Soo-yong and Park Soo-hong, who all debuted in the same year on KBS. It had been reported that Kim himself had been admitted to hospital due to their busy schedule, and Kim Gook-jin attempted to reason with television program producers to lighten their workload. However, this request was not received well by producers, who permanently banned Team Potato from making appearances on television. As a result, in January 1993, the four comedians planned to leave South Korea for the U.S., taking a break from the South Korean entertainment industry.

In 2011, he hosted the 2011 SBS Entertainment Awards, along with Shin Bong-sun and Kim Won-hee. In 2012, Kim became a CEO when he and comedian Kim Soo-yong started an online website called StarLogin, which allows companies and businesses alike to easily contact South Korean celebrities, including entertainers, singers and comedians, for events such as lectures, festivals or corporate events.

After his gambling scandal, Kim had spent nearly three years inactive in the entertainment industry.

In 2015, he became a cast member of tvN's variety television program, Useful Men, making his first appearance on South Korean television since his career break that he took during his gambling scandal.

In October 2021, Kim decided not to renew his contract with FNC Entertainment.

On November 15, 2021, Kim founded the Matched Project (MCP) agency with Ahn Jung-hwan, Kim Sung-joo, and Jung Hyung-don.

== Personal life ==
In March 2013, Kim was investigated for illegally gambling more than 1,000,000,000 KRW (approximately $900,000 USD) online on sports websites, under his manager's bank account. This could be described as the start of the investigations into other South Korean celebrities such as Tak Jae-hoon and Lee Soo-geun, who, along with Kim, were reportedly encouraged to gamble by an individual from their football club. Kim chose to leave the television programs he regularly took part in, including Vitamin, giving himself time to reflect. Kim was officially charged with gambling 1,300,000,000 KRW (approximately $1,170,000 USD) between March 2008 and May 2011, in April 2013. He was given a one-year prison sentence.

Kim, among other South Korean celebrities such as Kim Won-hee and Song Eun-i, is a part of a volunteer group called God is Love Ministry (GIL Ministry), who raise money to provide medical sponsorships for Haitian children with congenital heart disease to travel to South Korea to be medically treated.

== Filmography ==
=== Variety shows ===
==== Current ====
Year	Title	Notes/Ref.
2018–2022	South Korean Foreigners (대한외국인)	Host
2018–present	Hungry Husband	Cast member
2021	Hogu's Secret Tutoring	Host
2021	Let's Play Soccer 2	Host
2022	Tomorrow is a Hero-Kanbu	Host
2022	Treasure Yeojido	Host
2022	Neighborhood Billiards	Host
2022	Taste of Travel	Cast Member
2022	Ahn Jung-hwan's Hidden Qatar	Regular Member
2023	Rural Police Returns (Season 1–2)	Cast Member

==== Former ====
Year	Title	Notes/Ref.
2002–2010	Sunday Night	Cast member/host in various segments
2007	Jiwhaza	Cast member
2007–2008	Line Up	Cast member
2009	Himnaera Him!	Host
2010–2013	Vitamin	Host
2011–2012	Sunday Night	Cast member/host in various segments
2015	Useful Men	Cast member
2016–2018	Carefree Travellers - Season 1	Cast member
2017	Strange Restaurant	Host
2017–2018	Happy Together - Legendary Big Mouth	Cast member
2018	Alien Mom, Alien Dad	Host
2019	Six-Party Talks	MC
2018–2022	Problem Child in House	Cast member

=== Television series ===
Year	Title	Role	Notes/Ref.
2004–2005	Nonstop 5	Kim Yong-man	

== Awards and nominations ==
Year	Award	Category	Nominated work	Result	Ref.
1998	MBC Comedy Daesang	Excellence Award		Won	
1999	MBC Comedy Daesang	Grand Prize		Won	
2000	MBC Comedy Daesang	Daesang		Won	
2001	Baeksang Arts Awards	Best Variety Performer - Male		Won	
2002	MBC Entertainment Awards	Grand Prize		Won	
2003	MBC Entertainment Awards	Grand Prize		Won	
2005	MBC Entertainment Awards	PD's Award		Won	
2007	MBC Entertainment Awards	PD's Award		Won	
2009	SBS Entertainment Awards	Best MC Award - Male		Won	
2010	SBS Entertainment Awards	SBS 20th Anniversary Entertainment Star Award		Won	
2011	SBS Entertainment Awards	Netizen Popularity Award	Jagiya	Nominated	
2018	18th MBC Entertainment Awards	Best Teamwork	Curious Husband's Get Away	Won	
2018	18th MBC Entertainment Awards	Best Couple (with Cha In-pyo)	Curious Husband's Get Away	Nominated	
2018	18th MBC Entertainment Awards	Top Excellence in Variety (Male)	Curious Husband's Get Away	Nominated	
