= Pani Bottle =

South Korean YouTuber (born 1987)

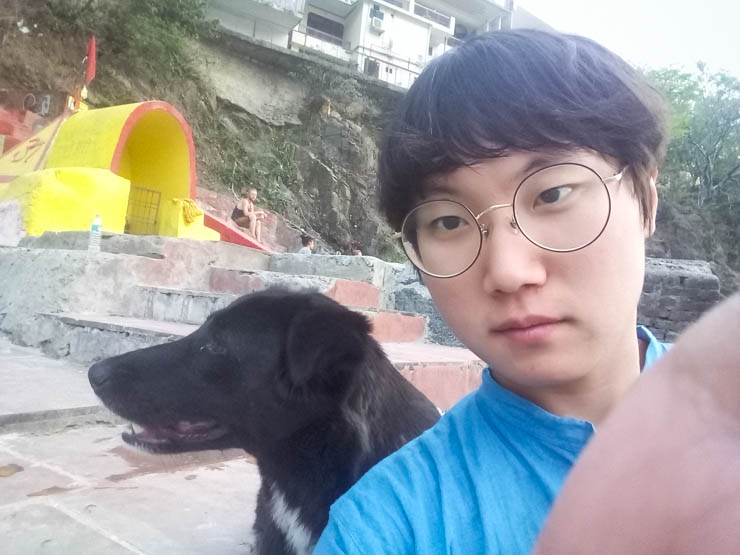
- Pani Bottle in India (2017)
- Born: Park Jae-han; October 26, 1987 (age 38); Chuncheon, Gangwon Province, South Korea

YouTube information
- Channel: @PaniBottle
- Genre: Travel
- Subscribers: 2.56 million
- Views: 693 million
- Last updated: April 2026

Park Jae-han (Korean: 박재한; born October 26, 1987) is a South Korean YouTuber that operates the travel YouTube channel Pani Bottle (빠니보틀). A 2024 news article described him as having the most subscribers of any South Korean travel YouTuber.

== Biography ==
Park was born in Chuncheon, Gangwon Province, South Korea on October 26, 1987. He began uploading videos to YouTube in March 2015. He received his current channel's name, Pani Bottle, after he uploaded a travel video of him in India, during which a water vendor reportedly shouted something that sounded like "pani bottle". A video of his experience on an Indian train was reportedly a turning point in his career, and was widely disseminated by the YouTube algorithm. It went on to receive over 7 million views.

He has since appeared in conventional South Korean television programs.
