= List of Infinite Challenge episodes =

The following is a list of episodes of the Korean reality-variety television comedy series Infinite Challenge (Korean: 무한도전; RR: Muhandojeon). The show's regular run ended on March 31, 2018, after 563 episodes. It was followed by three special episodes that ended on April 21, 2018.

== Series overview ==
Season	Episodes	Originally released	
Season	Episodes	First released	Last released
1	27	April 23, 2005	October 22, 2005
2	26	October 29, 2005	April 29, 2006
3	563	May 6, 2006	March 31, 2018

== Season 1 (2005) ==
Season 1 of Infinite Challenge is called Reckless Challenge (무모한 도전). This season involves the cast members attempting to complete extreme challenges, such as racing against a train. There are 27 episodes in Season 1.

- Regular cast: Yoo Jae-suk, Jung Hung-don and Noh Hong-chul
- Temporary cast: Pyo Young-ho (episodes 1–8), Lee Byeong-jin (episodes 3–5), Park Myung-soo (episodes 5–15), Kim Sung-soo (episodes 8–end) and Lee Kyun (episodes 15–25)
List of Episodes – Season 1

No. overall	No. in season	Title	Original release date	Guest(s)
1	1	"Tug of War with a Bull" (Korean: 황소와 줄다리기)	April 23, 2005	Lee Jung
2	2	"100 Meter Race with a Train" (Korean: 전철과 100m 달리기)	April 30, 2005	Lee Byeong-jin and Lee Kyun
3	3	"Cruise Ship vs Duck Boat" (Korean: 유람선 vs 오리배)	May 7, 2005	Kim Jae-duck
4	4	"Bathroom Drain vs Human Water Pump" (Korean: 목욕탕 자연배수 vs 인간의 물퍼내기)	May 14, 2005	Park Myung-soo
5	5	"Human vs Rescue Dog: Dog Paddle Challenge" (Korean: 인간 vs 구조견, 개헤엄 대결)	May 21, 2005	Eun Ji-won
6	6	"Human vs Laundry Wringer" (Korean: 탈수기 vs 빨래짜기)	May 28, 2005	Kim Sung-soo
7	7	"Human vs Coin Sorting Machine" (Korean: 인간 vs 동전분류기)	June 4, 2005	Haha
8	8	"Holding Out on a Bus" (Korean: 버스 안에서 버티기)	June 11, 2005	Chae Geon
9	9	"Human vs Car Wash: Car Wash Challenge" (Korean: 인간 vs 세차기, 세차 대결)	June 18, 2005	Kim Chang-yeol
10	10	"Water Pump vs Humans: Water Filling Challenge" (Korean: 물 펌프 vs 인간, 물 채우기 대결)	June 25, 2005	Kim Jin
11	11	"Excavator vs Human: Digging Challenge" (Korean: 굴삭기 vs 인간, 흙 퍼담기 대결)	July 2, 2005	Kim Jong-seok
12	12	"Guam Special Part 1: Polynesian Dance Troupe vs Infinite Challenge Waist Dance Challenge" (Korean: 괌 특집 1, 폴리네시안 댄스단 vs 무한도전 허리춤 대결)	July 9, 2005	Lee Byeong-jin
13	13	"Guam Special Part 2: Chamorro People vs Infinite Challenge Push Challenge" (Korean: 괌 특집 2, 차모르족 vs 무한도전팀, 밀어내기 대결)	July 16, 2005	Lee Byeong-jin
14	14	"Firetruck Siren vs Voice" (Korean: 소방차 사이렌 vs 목소리)	July 23, 2005	Lee Kyun
15	15	"Mosquito Repellent vs Human: Mosquito Catching Challenge" (Korean: 모기향 vs 인간, 모기잡기 대결)	July 30, 2005	N/A
16	16	"Don't Scream in a Haunted House" (Korean: 귀신의 집에서 소리 안 지르기)	August 6, 2005	Kim Jong-kook and Jewelry
17	17	"Briquette Stacking Challenge" (Korean: 연탄 옮겨 쌓기 대결)	August 13, 2005	Cha Seung-won
18	18	"Best 5"	August 20, 2005	N/A
19	19	"Bulldozer and Car Rolling Challenge with Lee Beom-soo" (Korean: 이범수와 함께하는 불도저와 차 굴리기 대결)	August 27, 2005	Lee Beom-soo
20	20	"Sled Dog vs Human: Sled Pulling Challenge" (Korean: 썰매견 vs 인간, 썰매끌기 대결)	September 3, 2005	Kim Jong-kook
21	21	"60 Second Challenge" (Korean: 60초 세기 도전)	September 10, 2005	Jeong Jun-ha
22	22	"Infinite Challenge vs Esper Ito" (Korean: 무한도전 vs 에스파이토)	September 17, 2005	Esper Ito
23	23	"Sharapova Challenge Part 1" (Korean: 샤라포바와의 대결 1편)	September 24, 2005	Maria Sharapova and Koo Jun-yup
24	24	"Sharapova Challenge Part 2" (Korean: 샤라포바와의 대결 2편)	October 1, 2005	Maria Sharapova and Koo Jun-yup
25	25	"Arm Wrestling Challenge with 172 High School Girls" (Korean: 여고생 172명과 팔씨름 대결)	October 8, 2005	Gong Hyung-jin
26	26	"Applying Lipstick on a Carnival Ride" (Korean: 놀이기구에서 립스틱 바르기)	October 15, 2005	Sugar
27	27	"Best Scenes from Reckless Challenge" (Korean: 무모한 도전 명장면 베스트)	October 22, 2005	N/A

== Season 2 (2005–2006) ==
Season 2 of Infinite Challenge is split into two parts, with the first 6 episodes called Excessive Challenge (무리한 도전) and the remainder of the season called Infinite Challenge – Master of Quiz (무한도전 퀴즈의달인). In total, there are 26 episodes in Season 2.

- Regular cast: Yoo Jae-suk, Jung Hung-don and Noh Hong-chul
- Temporary cast: Jo Hye-ryun (episodes 1–5), Yoon Jung-soo (episodes 1–5), Kim Sung-soo (episodes 1–7), Lee Yoon-seok (episodes 1–16), Park Myung-soo (episode 5–end), Haha (episode 8–end) and Jeong Jun-ha (episode 21–end)
List of Episodes – Season 2

No. overall	No. in season	Title	Original release date	Guest(s)
28	1	"Swing Baseball Episode" (Korean: 그네야구편)	October 29, 2005	N/A
29	2	"A Race Between a Human and a Horse" (Korean: 인간과 말의 달리기 대결)	November 5, 2005	N/A
30	3	"Fire Truck and Fire Fighting Challenge Part 1" (Korean: 소방차와 불끄기 대결 1편)	November 12, 2005	Bong Tae-gyu
31	4	"Fire Truck and Fire Fighting Challenge Part 2" (Korean: 소방차와 불끄기 대결 2편)	November 19, 2005	Bong Tae-gyu
32	5	"Leaf Sweeper Car and Leaf Sweeping Challenge" (Korean: 낙엽청소차와 낙엽 쓸기 대결)	November 26, 2005	N/A
33	6	"Mental Calculation King vs Infinite Challenge Team" (Korean: 암산왕 vs 무한도전팀)	December 10, 2005	Shindong and Lee Jeong-hee
34	7	"Master of Quiz" (Korean: 퀴즈의 달인)	December 17, 2005	N/A
35	8	"Master of Quiz Christmas Special" (Korean: 크리스마스 특집 퀴즈의 달인)	December 24, 2005	N/A
36	9	"Master of Quiz Year-End Special" (Korean: 연말특집 퀴즈의 달인)	December 31, 2005	N/A
37	10	"Master of Quiz New Year's Special - Who's the Best?" (Korean: 신년특집 퀴즈의 달인 - 얼짱 1위는 누구?)	January 7, 2006	N/A
38	11	"Master of Quiz First Appearance on the Title Screen" (Korean: 퀴즈의 달인 타이틀화면 첫 등장)	January 14, 2006	N/A
39	12	"Master of Quiz - Results of Ulzzang Vote" (Korean: 퀴즈의 달인 - 얼짱 투표 결과)	January 21, 2006	N/A
40	13	"Master of Quiz Korean New Year Special - Which Person Do You Want to Keep as a Pet?" (Korean: 퀴즈의 달인 설특집 - 애완동물로 키우고 싶은 사람은?)	January 28, 2006	N/A
41	14	"Master of Quiz Early Spring Special - Who Can You Proudly Introduce to Your Parents?" (Korean: 퀴즈의 달인 입춘특집 - 부모님께 당당히 소개시킬 수 있는 사람은?)	February 4, 2006	N/A
42	15	"Master of Quiz Valentine's Day Special - Who Looks the Best in a Chocolate Commercial?" (Korean: 퀴즈의 달인 발렌타인데이특집 - 초콜렛CF가 가장 잘 어울리는 멤버)	February 11, 2006	N/A
43	16	"Master of Quiz Graduation Special - Who Was the Cutest Kid?" (Korean: 퀴즈의 달인 졸업특집 - 어린시절 가장 귀여웠을 것 같은 멤버는?)	February 18, 2006	N/A
44	17	"Master of Quiz Lee Hyori Special" (Korean: 퀴즈의 달인 이효리특집)	February 25, 2006	Lee Hyori
45	18	"Master of Quiz Lee Hyori Special 2" (Korean: 퀴즈의 달인 이효리특집 2)	March 4, 2006	Lee Hyori
46	19	"Master of Quiz Lee Kyung-kyu Special" (Korean: 퀴즈의 달인 이경규특집)	March 11, 2006	Lee Kyung-kyu
47	20	"20th Episode Special - Who Studied the Best?" (Korean: 20회 특집 - 공부를 가장 잘했을것 같은 멤버는?)	March 18, 2006	N/A
48	21	"Master of Quiz - Who Will Live a Long Life?" (Korean: 퀴즈의 달인 - 장수할 것 같은 멤버는?)	March 25, 2006	N/A
49	22	"Master of Quiz - Who Best Fits the Title of Pretty Man?" (Korean: 퀴즈의 달인 - 예쁜남자에 제일 잘 어울리는 멤버는?)	April 1, 2006	Voices of Lee Jong-beom and Bae Seul-ki
50	23	"Master of Quiz - Black Day Special, Meeting Your Girlfriend's Parents + Job Interview" (Korean: 퀴즈의 달인 - 블랙데이특집 여자친구 부모님께 인사하기 + 신입면접)	April 8, 2006	Lee Soo-young
51	24	"Master of Quiz - New York Special + Which Member is Likely to Go Solo First?" (Korean: 퀴즈의 달인 - 뉴욕특집 + 가장먼저 솔로탈출 할 것 같은 멤버는?)	April 15, 2006	Tony An
52	25	"Master of Quiz - China Special + Lips That Call for a Kiss?" (Korean: 퀴즈의 달인 - 중국특집 + 키스를 부르는 입술?)	April 22, 2006	Voices of Bae Seul-ki and Lee Da-hae
53	26	"Master of Quiz - Yi Sun-sin Birthday Special + Who Will Have the Prettiest Daughter?" (Korean: 퀴즈의 달인 - 충무공 탄신일 특집 + 가장 예쁜 딸을 낳을것 같은 멤버?)	April 29, 2006	Voice of Kim Min-jin

== Season 3 (2006–2018) ==
This renewed version of the Infinite Challenge (Muhan Dojeon, 무한도전) aired between May 6, 2006, and March 31, 2018. While the other seasons seemed to have some sort of theme, the third season had no overarching theme whatsoever, but rather a different theme every week.

- Regular members : Yoo Jae-suk, Park Myeong-su, Jeong Jun-ha, Haha, Yang Se-hyung, Jo Se-ho
- Former members : Jun Jin, Gil, Noh Hong-chul, Jeong Hyeong-don, Hwang Kwang-hee

=== 2006 ===
List of Episodes - Season 3 (2006) Episodes 1-34

Season 3 (2006)
#	Episodes #	Air Date	Synopsis	Guest/Notes
54	1	May 6, 2006	Golf Putting Challenge (IC versus Michelle Wie ( (United States) Professional Golfer))	Michelle Wie & SS501
55	2	May 13, 2006	Golf Putting Challenge (IC vs. Michelle Wie ( (United States) Professional Golfer))	Michelle Wie & SS501
56	3	May 20, 2006	Space Special	
57	4	May 27, 2006	Wedding Special	
58	5	June 3, 2006	World Cup 2006 Special #1 - World All-Stars	
59	6	June 10, 2006	World Cup 2006 Special #2 - South Korea versus Togo	
60	7	June 17, 2006	World Cup 2006 Special #3 - South Korea versus France	Kim Hyun-Chul
61	8	June 24, 2006	World Cup 2006 Special #4 - South Korea versus Switzerland	
62	9	July 1, 2006	Summer Vacation Special #1 - Hawaii Swimming Pool Special	
63	10	July 8, 2006	Summer Vacation Special #2 - Bali Swimming Pool Special	
64	11	July 15, 2006	Quiz Challenge with Shinhwa #1	Shinhwa
65	12	July 29, 2006	Quiz Challenge with Shinhwa #2	Shinhwa
Programming Concept Change
66	13	August 5, 2006	Summer Evening Features #1 - Deserted School	
67	14	August 12, 2006	Summer Evening Features #2 - Deserted House	
68	15	August 19, 2006	'The Fellowship Of Ice' in Queenstown, New Zealand	
69	16	August 26, 2006	'The Two Hot Springs' Queenstown, New Zealand	Voice of Ji Sang-ryeol
70	17	September 2, 2006	'The Return of the Bare-Faces' in Queenstown, New Zealand	
71	18	September 9, 2006	Fedor Emelianenko Special ( (Russia) Mixed Martial Artist)	Fedor Emelianenko
72	19	September 16, 2006	Fedor Emelianenko Special ( (Russia) Mixed Martial Artist)	Fedor Emelianenko
73	20	September 23, 2006	Please, Be Friendly - Haha & Jeong Hyeong-don 'Break the Ice' #1	
74	21	September 30, 2006	Please, Be Friendly - Haha & Jeong Hyeong-don 'Break the Ice' #2	
75	22	October 7, 2006	Chuseok Special	
76	23	October 14, 2006	Hyeong-don, Let's Play!	
77	24	October 21, 2006	Autumn Picnic Special	
78	25	October 28, 2006	Farming Village Special	
79	26	November 4, 2006	Kim Soo-ro Special - Please be fooled!	Kim Soo-ro
80	27	November 11, 2006	Kim Soo-ro Special - Please be fooled!	Kim Soo-ro
80	27	November 11, 2006	Exam Special	Kim Soo-ro
81	28	November 18, 2006	Infinite Challenge! Supermodel #1	Lie Sang-bong & Song Hwi
82	29	November 25, 2006	Infinite Challenge! Supermodel #2	Lie Sang-bong & Song Hwi
83	30	December 2, 2006	Kimchi Preparation Challenges	Yoo Jae-suk officially confirms he is dating Na Gyeong-eun (MBC's Announcer), respectfully.
84	31	December 9, 2006	Youth Athletic Tournament Special	SS501; In an unaired incident, Park Myeong-su pulls Jeong Jun-ha's pants down in front of hundreds of SS501 fans.
85	32	December 16, 2006	Christmas Special #2	Lee Seung-chul & Kim Tae-hee
86	33	December 23, 2006	Christmas Special #3	Joo Young-hoon
87	34	December 30, 2006	2006 Infinity Challenge Awards	Boom, Ji Sang-ryeol, MC Mong, Kim Mi-jin & Ma Bong-chun

=== 2007 ===
List of Episodes - Season 3 (2007) Episodes 35-85

Season 3 (2007)
#	Episodes #	Air Date	Synopsis	Guest/Notes
88	35	January 1, 2007	New Year Special	
89	36	January 13, 2007	Noh Hong-chul's X-Files - Who owns the 'Red High-Heel' ?	
90	37	January 20, 2007	Infinite Doctors - Examining Jeong Hyeong-don	Jeon Mun-ui, Choi Jun-yeong
91	38	January 27, 2007	1970's-80's Special at the roller rink	
92	39	February 3, 2007	Special Language Training (Paju English village)	Melanie Walters
93	40	February 10, 2007	Alaska Special (Hanamana Song)	Cha Tae-hyun, Tablo, DJ Tukutz
94	41	February 17, 2007	2007 Lunar New Year's Day Special	Jung Il-woo, Kim Hye-seong
95	42	February 24, 2007	MBC Infinite Challenge's 100-minute Debate	
95	42	February 24, 2007	Hanamana Song Music video	
95	42	February 24, 2007	Spicy Chocolate (Hidden Camera)	
95	42	February 24, 2007	Golden Pig Year Special Challenges	
96	43	March 3, 2007	Beginning School Special - Infinite Challenge members become teachers	Seoul Foreign School Girls
97	44	March 10, 2007	Making a Drama Challenge #1	Kim Soo-ro, Jeong Su-young
98	45	March 17, 2007	Making a Drama Challenge #2	Kim Soo-ro, Lee Hyori
99	46	March 24, 2007	Making a Drama Challenge #3 - 'Romance' Part 1 Aired	Lee Hyori
100	47	March 31, 2007	Making a Drama Challenge #4 - 'Romance' Part 2 Aired	Lee Hyori; During the 4th Part 'Drama Challenge', both the popularity of Infinite Challenge and its market share went down
100	47	March 31, 2007	Park Myeong-su's Big Star Show! #1	
101	48	April 7, 2007	Jeong Jun-ha Birthday Hidden Camera	
101	48	April 7, 2007	Park Myeong-su's Big Star Show! #2	
101	48	April 7, 2007	Hyeong-don, Let's Move! - Infinite Challenge members help Jeong Hyeong-don move house #1	
102	49	April 14, 2007	Hyeong-don, Let's Move! - Infinite Challenge members help Jeong Hyeong-don move house #2	
102	49	April 14, 2007	Hanamana Song Festival #1	
103	50	April 21, 2007	Season 3 – 1st Anniversary Special #1: Truth Camera; Challenge 50 - Special Challenges related to the number 50	Park Myeong-su, Jeong Jun-ha, Noh Hong-chul and Haha's managers, Kim Tae-ho (Infinite Challenge PD)
104	51	April 28, 2007	Season 3 – 1st Anniversary Special #2: Group Challenge; Infinite Girls' High School - To challenge the traditional culture of the average South Korean teenage girl	Voice of Kwon Sang-woo
105	52	May 5, 2007	Lee Young-ae Special	Lee Young-ae
106	53	May 12, 2007	Bong-chun Circus Challenge	Kids from Yeongwol County, Donghae, Gangwon
107	54	May 19, 2007	Infinite Miss Korea Pageant	
107	54	May 19, 2007	Choi Ji-woo Special	Choi Ji-woo
108	55	May 26, 2007	Hanamana Song Festival #2	Choreographer Eom Tae-in & Kim Hyun-chul
109	56	June 2, 2007	Rice Planting Special	
110	57	June 9, 2007	Thierry Henry Special #1 ( (France) Soccer Player)	Thierry Henry
111	58	June 16, 2007	Thierry Henry Special #2 ( (France) Soccer Player)	Thierry Henry
112	59	June 23, 2007	A Desert Island Special from El Nido, Philippines #1 - The Curse of the Black Pearl	
113	60	June 30, 2007	A Desert Island Special from El Nido, Philippines #2 - At World's End	
114	61	July 7, 2007	2007 Infinite Challenge North Gangbyeon Road Song Festival #1	Yoon Il-sang, Ahn Jeong-hun
114	61	July 7, 2007	A Deal is a Deal	Noh Hong-chul as promised changes his hairstyle
115	62	July 14, 2007	2007 Infinite Challenge North Gangbyeon Road Song Festival #2	
115	62	July 14, 2007	Infinite Challenge '24' at MBC Headquarters #1	Sung Si-kyung
116	63	July 21, 2007	Infinite Challenge 24 at MBC Headquarters #2: Voluntary Security Service at Midnight; Ridiculous Outdoor Camping in the Lobby	
116	63	July 21, 2007	Midsummer-Day Special: Food Lotto; Cooking Challenge - Infinite Challenge versus Dae Jang Geum	
117	64	July 28, 2007	Comedy 'Silmido' Special: Make Laughter or Die; Mud Wrestling; Saving Private Banana; Finding My Mother – Featuring special guest Na Moon-hee from the cast of High Kick!	Na Moon-hee
118	65	August 4, 2007	American Old West Special: 2007 Infinite News – An in-depth report on why Jeong Jun-ha is always late; Jun-ha Rodeo – Jeong Jun-ha's strength is put to the test; Gunfight at the O.K. Corral; Steal the Gold	
119	66	August 11, 2007	Water Boys Special	Announcer Heo Il-hu, Lee Kyung-kyu and his daughter Lee Ye-rim
120	67	August 18, 2007	Seoul Touring Race #1	
121	68	August 25, 2007	Seoul Touring Race #2	Han Hye-jin
122	69	September 1, 2007	DIY Special #1: Park Myeong-su's Big Star Show!; 'Change' hosted by Jeong Hyeong-don	Yoo Jae-suk's act Yoo Geo-seong (an imitation of Park Myeong-su became widely popular)
123	70	September 8, 2007	DIY Special #2: Han-Ip-man – The members visit several restaurants in Yeouido and taste various meals; Boys without fear – The members aim to overcome their individual fears	
124	71	September 15, 2007	DIY Special #3: Haha's Ask ME Anything - Haha takes phone calls from Elementary, Middle and High School Students	
124	71	September 15, 2007	Sseokso & The City - What is the meaning of fashion?	Fashion Designer Park Man-hyeon
125	72	September 22, 2007	Chuseok Special - Yuna Kim Special ( (South Korea) Figure Skater)	Yuna Kim
126	73	September 29, 2007	Please, Watch Your Mouth - Infinite Challenge Goes to Japan	
127	74	October 6, 2007	Infinite Challenge's Autumn Field Day	
128	75	October 13, 2007	Madness Couples - Find a Relationship between the members and their staff	Managers of Infinite Challenge Cast
128	75	October 13, 2007	Job Interview of Infinite Challenge #1	
129	76	October 20, 2007	A Lesson of Being a Father	Im Ye-jun (baby)
129	76	October 20, 2007	Job Interview of Infinite Challenge #2	Kim Young-hee, Je Yeong-jae, Im Jeong-ah & Gwon seok (MBC Interviewer)
130	77	October 27, 2007	Jun-Hines Ward Special	Choi Jong-hoon (Jeong Jun-ha's manager)
131	78	November 3, 2007	Infinite Challenge's Captain Planet	
132	79	November 10, 2007	Renewable Energy Special	Infinite Challenge Producers, Kim Hyeong-ja, Go Nae-un, Kim Doh-yang
133	80	November 24, 2007	Sport Dance Special #1	Dancer Park Ji-eun
134	81	December 1, 2007	Sport Dance Special #2	Dancer Park Ji-eun
134	81	December 1, 2007	Paris Hilton Special ( (United States) Heiress & Socialite)	Paris Hilton
135	82	December 8, 2007	Sport Dance Special #3	Dancer Park Ji-eun
136	83	December 15, 2007	Calendar 2008 Special	Kim Ok-jeong (Haha's Mother)
137	84	December 22, 2007	Infinite Challenge's 'Thank You Concert' - Preparation	Kyunghee University Music Students
137	84	December 22, 2007	Dawn Caroling - Surprise Wakeup Call	
138	85	December 29, 2007	Infinite Challenge's 'Thank You Concert' Special	Shin Bong-sun, Kim Ok-jeong (Haha's mother)

=== 2008 ===
List of Episodes - Season 3 (2008) Episodes 86-136

Season 3 (2008)
#	Episodes #	Air Date	Synopsis	Guest/Notes
139	86	January 5, 2008	New Year Special #1 - At the Donghae-1 Gas Field	
140	87	January 12, 2008	New Year Special #2 - At the Donghae-1 Gas Field	
141	88	January 19, 2008	Wind of the Palace Cast Special	Lee Seo-jin, Han Ji-min, Han Sang-jin, Lee Jong-su, Maeng Sang-hoon, Jang Hui-ung, Lee Hui-do, Gyeon Gin & Seo Beom-sik
142	89	January 26, 2008	Beijing 2008 Special - Gymnastics Edition	Republic of Korea Men's Gymnastics Team
143	90	February 2, 2008	Where is my Manager's Home ?	Choi Jong-hoon (Jeong Jun-ha's Manager)
143	90	February 2, 2008	Haha's Mother's DdeokGook Special #1	Kim Ok-jeong (Haha's Mother)
144	91	February 9, 2008	Haha's Mother's DdeokGook Special #2	
144	91	February 9, 2008	Special Force's Cold Weather Training Special	Korean Soldiers, Managers of Noh Hong-chul and Haha
145	92	February 16, 2008	Haha Guerilla Concert Special	Lee Yo-won, Han Ji-min, Lee Seo-jin, Han Sang-jin, Lee Jong-su & Ahn Hye-kyeong (Haha's Ex); Haha's last appearance before his military duty.
146	93	February 23, 2008	Infinite Challenge Hello! India #1	
147	94	March 1, 2008	Infinite Challenge Hello! India #2	
148	95	March 8, 2008	Infinite Challenge Hello! India #3	
148	95	March 8, 2008	Team Leader Elections: Infinite News - Park Myeong-su Get's Married!	Voices of Yoon Jong-shin and Kim Ah-joong
149	96	March 15, 2008	Beijing 2008 Special - Wrestling Edition #1	Republic of Korea Men's Wrestling Team, Zo In-sung, voices of Lee Hyuk-jae and So Ji-sub
150	97	March 22, 2008	Beijing 2008 Special - Wrestling Edition #2	Republic of Korea Men's Wrestling Team, Zo In-sung, Park Hwi-sun, Kim Hyun-chul & Lee Un-chae (International Wrestling Referee)
151	98	March 29, 2008	Earth Special Forces - Planting trees in the Gobi Desert	Managers of Park Hyun-bin and Noh Hong-chul
152	99	April 5, 2008	Realise Your Dreams Special	Jeong Seok-gwon (Park Myeong-su's Manager), Choi Jong-hoon (Jeong Jun-ha's Manager), Kim Yu-gon
152	99	April 5, 2008	My Weak Brother's Marriage Special	
153	100	April 12, 2008	100th Episode Special #1: Jeong Jun-ha Eats Noodles at 100 km/Hour	Voice of Han Ji-min
154	101	April 19, 2008	100th Episode Special #2	Former MBC Announcer/President Ohm Ki-Young
155	102	April 26, 2008	Finding Treasures in Gyeongju Special #1	
156	103	May 3, 2008	Finding Treasures in Gyeongju Special #2	
157	104	May 10, 2008	Taean Special - Build a Children's Library	
158	105	May 17, 2008	1st Infinite Challenge Self Created Children's Song Festival	
159	106	May 24, 2008	Beijing 2008 Special - Handball Edition	
160	107	May 31, 2008	Guinness Book of Records Special	
161	108	June 7, 2008	Infinite News - Special Report!	
161	108	June 7, 2008	Visit a family for 24 Hours Special Part 1	
162	109	June 14, 2008	Visit a family for 24 Hours Special Part 2	
163	110	June 21, 2008	Run Away with the Money Bag Special #1	Jun Jin
164	111	June 28, 2008	Run Away with the Money Bag Special #2	Jun Jin
165	112	July 5, 2008	Run Away with the Money Bag Special #3	Jun Jin
165	112	July 5, 2008	Infinity Girls #1	Jun Jin
166	113	July 12, 2008	Infinity Girls #2	Jun Jin
167	114	July 19, 2008	Renewable Energy Special #2	Lee Min-woo & Kim Shin-young; Jun Jin becomes a regular member.
168	115	July 26, 2008	Pirate of the Taerabbean (Taean + Caribbean) Special	Lee Yoon-suk, Yoo Chae-yeong
169	116	August 2, 2008	Get Up!x2 Please Come Early	
169	116	August 2, 2008	Blockbuster Horror Zombie Special	
169	116	August 2, 2008	28 Years Later	
170	117	August 16, 2008	Beijing 2008 Special #1	
171	118	August 23, 2008	Beijing 2008 Special #2	
172	119	August 30, 2008	Beijing 2008 Special #3	
173	120	September 6, 2008	Badminton Challenge: IC members receives a letter of challenge from newly crowned Olympic Badminton Gold Medalists Lee Yong-dae and Lee Hyo-jung	Lee Yong-dae & Lee Hyo-jung
174	121	September 13, 2008	Chuseok Special 2008 - Desperate Housewives	
175	122	September 20, 2008	Punishment Special - Sorry I Couldn't Protect You #1	
175	122	September 20, 2008	Surprise Paparazzi	
176	123	September 27, 2008	Be a PD for a day	
177	124	October 4, 2008	Viewing of the PD Segments: IC members gather to watch and critique the individual filmed segments done in the previous episodes.	
178	125	October 11, 2008	The Great Design Challenge - Design Korea! #1	
179	126	October 18, 2008	The Great Design Challenge - Design Korea! #2	
180	127	October 25, 2008	Be my Manager for a Day #1	
181	128	November 1, 2008	Be my Manager for a Day #2	
182	129	November 8, 2008	The Aerobic Challenge #1 - Aerobics or Aerobic ?	
183	130	November 15, 2008	The Aerobic Challenge #2 - Training Hard	
184	131	November 22, 2008	The Aerobic Challenge #3 - A Fun Day at the Beach ?	
185	132	November 29, 2008	The Aerobic Challenge #4	
186	133	December 6, 2008	2009 Calendar Making #1	
187	134	December 13, 2008	2009 Calendar Making #2	
188	135	December 20, 2008	You & Me Concert #1	Notable performances include Big Bag song "Haru Haru" (a parody on Big Bang) and the instrumental piece presented by the guys, who specially learn an instrument each for the concert.
189	136	December 27, 2008	You & Me Concert #2	Notable performances include Big Bag song "Haru Haru" (a parody on Big Bang) and the instrumental piece presented by the guys, who specially learn an instrument each for the concert.

=== 2009 ===
List of Episodes - Season 3 (2009) Episodes 137-185

Season 3 (2009)
#	Episodes #	Air Date	Synopsis	Guest/Notes
190	137	January 17, 2009	You & Me Concert #3	Notable performances include Big Bag song "Haru Haru" (a parody on Big Bang) and the instrumental piece presented by the guys, who specially learn an instrument each for the concert.
191	138	January 24, 2009	The Great Bobsleigh Challenge #1	
192	139	January 31, 2009	The Great Bobsleigh Challenge #2	Kang Kwang-bae
193	140	February 7, 2009	The Great Bobsleigh Challenge #3	Kang Kwang-bae
194	141	February 14, 2009	Boys Over Flowers Parody	
195	142	February 21, 2009	"Gee" Parody	
195	142	February 21, 2009	New Jobs	
196	143	February 28, 2009	Personality Test and Treatment	Song Hyung-suk (psychoanalyst), Chun Soo-jung (comedian)
197	144	March 7, 2009	Women's Day - What Women Want Special	Girls' Generation
198	145	March 14, 2009	Six Brothers and Sisters	
199	146	March 21, 2009	Korean Dol+I The Search of NHC Number 2	
200	147	March 28, 2009	Project Runaway	
201	148	April 4, 2009	Punishment Day	
202	149	April 11, 2009	Life Theater: Yes or No #1	
203	150	April 18, 2009	Life Theater: Yes or No #2	
204	151	April 25, 2009	Yuna Kim Special ( (South Korea) Figure Skater)	Yuna Kim; Gil becomes a regular member.
205	152	May 2, 2009	Photo Contest - Around the World in a Day ?	
206	153	May 9, 2009	ChunHyang Special	
207	154	May 16, 2009	General Park's Surprise Attack	
208	155	May 23, 2009	Cameo in Queen of Housewives	
209	156	May 30, 2009	Who wants to be a Millionaire #1	
210	157	June 6, 2009	Who wants to be a Millionaire #2	
211	158	June 20, 2009	Pimple Break #1	
212	159	June 27, 2009	Pimple Break #2	
213	160	July 4, 2009	2009 Infinite Challenge Olympic Highway Duet Song Festival #1	Yoon Mi-rae, Tiger JK, Epik High, No Brain, Jessica (Girls' Generation), After School & YB
214	161	July 11, 2009	2009 Infinite Challenge Olympic Highway Duet Song Festival #2	Yoon Mi-rae, Tiger JK, Epik High, No Brain, Jessica (Girls' Generation), After School & YB
215	162	July 18, 2009	2010 Calendar Making #1	
216	163	July 25, 2009	Future Liger's appearance in Show! Music Core and behind the scenes	Tiger JK, Yoon Mi-rae, Kim Sung-soo
216	163	July 25, 2009	Lifeguard Training Special	
217	164	August 1, 2009	Tell Me Your Wish, Park Myeong-su	
218	165	August 8, 2009	Survivor #1	Son Ho-young, Bae Jung-nam, Sangchu (Mighty Mouth), Kim Kyung-jin, K.Will, 2PM (Jae Bum & Junho), Jo Se-ho (as Yang Bae-chu), Park Hwi-sun, Lee Sung-jin; Short appearances by Heo Mi-young, Park Na-rae
219	166	August 15, 2009	Survivor #2	Son Ho-young, Bae Jung-nam, Sangchu (Mighty Mouth), Kim Kyung-jin, K.Will, 2PM (Jae Bum & Junho), Jo Se-ho (as Yang Bae-chu), Park Hwi-sun, Lee Sung-jin
220	167	August 22, 2009	Survivor #3	Son Ho-young, K.Will, Junho (2PM), Jo Se-ho (as Yang Bae-chu), Park Hwi-sun, Lee Sung-jin
220	167	August 22, 2009	Panic Room: IC members are trapped in a Container suspended in the air.; They are then given IQ/Mathematics problems to Solve. If They get the problems wrong, Container will continue to rise	Short appearance by Shin Dong-hoon
221	168	August 29, 2009	Summer Special - Blast to the Past!	
222	169	September 5, 2009	Catch the Tail Race #1	
223	170	September 12, 2009	Catch the Tail Race #2	
224	171	September 19, 2009	Home Shopping Special #1 - Hotseller Guys!: IC members become "goods" for sale	Comedian Ahn Young-mi and actress Yoo Ji-eun
225	172	September 26, 2009	Home Shopping Special #2 - Hotseller Guys!	
226	173	October 3, 2009	TV Channel the Entire Day #1	Park Hwi-sun, Sangchu (Mighty Mouth), K.Will, Kim Kyung-jin
227	174	October 10, 2009	TV Channel the Entire Day #2	Heo Il-woo (commentator), K.Will, Kim Kyung-jin, Sunwoo Yong-nyeo, Lee Kyung-sil, Kim Ji-sun, Jo Hye-ryun, Son Dam-bi (via phone), Lee Hyori (via phone)
228	175	October 17, 2009	Infinite Challenge Long Term Project - Rice Planting Special #1	Bae Kwang-hyuk (village chairman)
229	176	October 24, 2009	Infinite Challenge Long Term Project - Rice Planting Special #2	Choi Jung-hoon, 2PM
230	177	October 31, 2009	Infinite Challenge Long Term Project - Rice Planting Special #3	Kim Bum, Kara, Lee Min-woo (Shinhwa), Mithra Jin & Tablo (Epik High), Byun Ki-soo, Bada, Jewelry; Jun Jin's last recorded episode before entering the army.
231	178	November 7, 2009	Korean Food Challenge #1	
232	179	November 14, 2009	Korean Food Challenge #2	
233	180	November 21, 2009	Korean Food Challenge in New York #1	
234	181	November 28, 2009	Korean Food Challenge in New York #2	
235	182	December 5, 2009	The Devil Wears Gurida not Prada ?	
236	183	December 12, 2009	Goodbye New York	
236	183	December 12, 2009	2010 Calendar Making #2	
237	184	December 19, 2009	2010 Calendar Making #3	
238	185	December 26, 2009	Gangs of New York	

=== 2010 ===
List of Episodes - Season 3 (2010) Episodes 186-229

Season 3 (2010)
#	Episodes #	Air Date	Synopsis	Guest/Notes
239	186	January 2, 2010	Infinite Challenge Photo Exhibition	
239	186	January 2, 2010	Rice Gifting Special - The Good & Close Brothers #1	
240	187	January 9, 2010	Rice Gifting Special - The Good & Close Brothers #2	
240	187	January 9, 2010	Trash Dumping Special - The Quarrelling Brothers #1	
241	188	January 16, 2010	Rice Gifting Special Special - The Good & Close Brothers #3	
241	188	January 16, 2010	Trash Dumping Special - The Quarrelling Brothers #2	
242	189	January 23, 2010	Boxing Special #1	Tenku Tsubasa, Choi Hyunmi
243	190	January 30, 2010	Boxing Special #2	Tenku Tsubasa, Choi Hyunmi
244	191	February 6, 2010	F1 Challenge #1	
245	192	February 13, 2010	New's Year Diet Resolution	
245	192	February 13, 2010	F1 Challenge #2	
246	193	February 20, 2010	Infinite Challenge Legal Eagles : Be Careful of What You Said!: Gil takes Infinite Challenge to the Courtroom!	Choi Dam-bi (lawyer), Jang Jin-young (lawyer), Kim Young-hwan (lawyer), Kim Tae-ho PD
247	194	February 27, 2010	Infinite Challenge Legal Eagles : Be Careful of What You Said!: Gil takes Infinite Challenge to the Courtroom!	Choi Dam-bi (lawyer), Jang Jin-young (lawyer), Kim Young-hwan (lawyer), Jae Young-jae (IC staff), Yoon Sang-young (stylist), Lee Seung-jae (DNA analyst), Kim Je-dong, Lee Hyori
248	195	March 6, 2010	Oh! My Tent Special - Where in the World is Kim Sang-duk #1: The opposing legal teams layout the terms of punishment for each other; Park Myeong-su, Jeong Jun-ha and Gil have to spend 24 hours on the bungee platform.; Yoo Jae-suk, Noh Hong-chul and Jeong Hyeong-don fly to Alaska to search for the mysterious Kim Sang-duk	Kim Je-dong spend the night with the guys
249	196	March 13, 2010	Oh! My Tent Special - Where in the World is Kim Sang-duk #2: The opposing legal teams layout the terms of punishment for each other; Park Myeong-su, Jeong Jun-ha and Gil have to spend 24 hours on the bungee platform.; Yoo Jae-suk, Noh Hong-chul and Jeong Hyeong-don fly to Alaska to search for the mysterious Kim Sang-duk	Kim Je-dong spend the night with the guys
250	197	March 20, 2010	Oh! My Tent Special - Where in the World i Kim Sang-duk #3: The opposing legal teams layout the terms of punishment for each other; Park Myeong-su, Jeong Jun-ha and Gil have to spend 24 hours on the bungee platform.; Yoo Jae-suk, Noh Hong-chul and Jeong Hyeong-don fly to Alaska to search for the mysterious Kim Sang-duk	KARA, K.will, Jung Juri & Jung-in appears for a short visit; Kim Je-dong spend the night with the guys
251	198	March 27, 2010	Gods of Variety #1	Haha returns as a regular member after completing his military duty.
252	199	May 22, 2010	Gods of Variety #2	
252	199	May 22, 2010	The Diet Challenge Results	
253	200	May 29, 2010	200th Episode Anniversary #1	
254	201	June 5, 2010	200th Episode Anniversary #2	
255	202	June 12, 2010	2011 Calendar Model #1	
256	203	June 19, 2010	2011 Calendar Model #2	
257	204	June 26, 2010	Position Rearrangement	
258	205	July 3, 2010	WM7 Wrestling Special #1	
259	206	July 10, 2010	WM7 Wrestling Special #2	
260	207	July 17, 2010	Secret Vacation #1	
260	207	July 17, 2010	WM7 Wrestling Special #3	
261	208	July 24, 2010	WM7 Wrestling Special #4	
261	208	July 24, 2010	Secret Vacation #2	
262	209	July 31, 2010	Infinite Challenge Idol Audition #1	Kangta (H.O.T.), Donghae (Super Junior), Hwang Sang Hoon, f(x); Short appearance by Taecyeon and Wooyoung (2PM), Taemin (Shinee), and Yonghwa (CNBLUE)
262	209	July 31, 2010	WM7 Wrestling Special #5	
263	210	August 7, 2010	WM7 Wrestling Special #6	
263	210	August 7, 2010	Infinite Challenge Idol Audition #2	Kahi; Short appearance by Taecyeon and Wooyoung (2PM), Shinee, Orange Caramel, CNBLUE, 4Minute, Miss A, Infinite
264	211	August 14, 2010	Seven Special #1	
264	211	August 14, 2010	WM7 Wrestling Special #7	
265	212	August 21, 2010	Seven Special #2	
266	213	August 28, 2010	WM7 Wrestling Special #8	
267	214	September 4, 2010	WM7 Wrestling Special #9	
268	215	September 11, 2010	WM7 Wrestling Special #10	
268	215	September 11, 2010	Park Myeong-su's Guerilla Concert	
269	216	September 18, 2010	The Grateful Swallow (Bird)	
270	217	September 25, 2010	Bingo Bus Special	
271	218	October 2, 2010	2011 Calendar Model #3	
272	219	October 9, 2010	2011 Calendar Model #4	
273	220	October 16, 2010	Telepathy Special #1	
274	221	October 23, 2010	Telepathy Special #2	
275	222	October 30, 2010	7 Different View Points Special	
276	223	November 6, 2010	Midnight Survival in Seoul	
277	224	November 20, 2010	2011 Calendar Model #5	
278	225	November 27, 2010	2011 Calendar Model #6	
279	226	December 4, 2010	2011 Calendar Model #7	
280	227	December 11, 2010	Bibimbab Ad and the Point Results	
281	228	December 18, 2010	The Butterfly Effect Special	
282	229	December 25, 2010	Christmas Single Party	

=== 2011 ===
List of Episodes - Season 3 (2011) Episodes 230-282

Season 3 (2011)
#	Episodes #	Air Date	Synopsis	Guest/Notes
283	230	January 1, 2011	End of Year Settlement Write Off Grudges	
284	231	January 8, 2011	Manager Jeong is Buying!	
285	232	January 15, 2011	Life of Someone Else #1 - Park Myeong-su	
286	233	January 22, 2011	The Life of Someone Else #2	
286	233	January 22, 2011	Death Note	
287	234	January 29, 2011	TV Carries Love Special #1	
288	235	February 5, 2011	TV Carries Love Special #2	
289	236	February 12, 2011	Infinite Challenge Winter Olympics Special	
290	237	February 19, 2011	Japan Special #1 - Sea of Okhotsk	
291	238	February 26, 2011	Japan Special #2 - Sea of Okhotsk	
292	239	March 5, 2011	Life or Death Special	
293	240	March 12, 2011	You are Handsome #1	
294	241	March 19, 2011	You are Handsome #2	
295	242	March 26, 2011	You are Handsome #3	
295	242	March 26, 2011	Life of Someone Else #1 - Jeong Jun-ha	
296	243	April 2, 2011	Life of Someone Else #2 - Jeong Jun-ha	
297	244	April 9, 2011	The War of Money Special	
298	245	April 16, 2011	Speed Rowing Special #1	Kim Ji-ho (rowing coach)
299	246	April 23, 2011	Speed Rowing Special #2	Kim Ji-ho (rowing coach), Jeong Jinwoon, Lee Joon, Son Hoyoung, Defconn, Park Geun-sik
300	247	April 30, 2011	Dinner Show #1	Jung Jae-hyung, Lee Juck, Psy, Sweet Sorrow, 10cm, G-Dragon, Bada
301	248	May 7, 2011	Dinner Show #2	Jung Jae-hyung, Lee Juck, Psy, Sweet Sorrow, 10cm, G-Dragon, Bada
301	248	May 7, 2011	Gangs of Seoul #1	Big Bang
302	249	May 14, 2011	Gangs of Seoul #2	Big Bang
303	250	May 21, 2011	Infinite Company Outing	
304	251	May 28, 2011	Relationship Fabrication Team #1	
305	252	June 4, 2011	Relationship Fabrication Team #2	
306	253	June 11, 2011	2011 Infinite Challenge West Coast Expressway Song Festival #1	Jung Jae-hyung, Lee Juck, Psy, Sweet Sorrow, 10cm, G-Dragon, Bada
307	254	June 18, 2011	2011 Infinite Challenge West Coast Expressway Song Festival #2	Jung Jae-hyung, Lee Juck, Psy, Sweet Sorrow, 10cm, G-Dragon, Bada
308	255	June 25, 2011	2011 Infinite Challenge West Coast Expressway Song Festival #3	Jung Jae-hyung, Lee Juck, Psy, Sweet Sorrow, 10cm, G-Dragon, Bada
309	256	July 2, 2011	2011 Infinite Challenge West Coast Expressway Song Festival #4	Jung Jae-hyung, Lee Juck, Psy, Sweet Sorrow, 10cm, G-Dragon, Bada
310	257	July 9, 2011	Speed Rowing Special #3	Kim Ji-ho (rowing coach), Zo In-sung, Jeong Jinwoon
311	258	July 16, 2011	Speed Rowing Special #4	Kim Ji-ho (rowing coach), Jeong Jinwoon, Gary (Leessang), Defconn, Jung Jae-hyung
312	259	July 23, 2011	Speed Rowing Special #5	Kim Ji-ho (rowing coach), Jeong Jinwoon, Gary (Leessang), Defconn, Jung Jae-hyung
313	260	July 30, 2011	Infinite Challenge Classic	So Ji-sub
314	261	August 6, 2011	Speed Rowing Special - Grand Final	
315	262	August 13, 2011	Cancelled in Case of Rain Special #1	Gary (Leessang), Jung Jae-hyung, Defconn
316	263	August 20, 2011	Cancelled in Case of Rain Special #2	Gary (Leessang), Jung Jae-hyung, Defconn
317	264	August 27, 2011	Infinite Challenge Classic - So Ji-sub Returns Special #1	So Ji-sub
318	265	September 3, 2011	Infinite Challenge Classic - So Ji-sub Returns Special #2	So Ji-sub
318	265	September 3, 2011	Speed Special #1	
319	266	September 10, 2011	Chuseok Gift Special	
320	267	September 17, 2011	Speed Special #2	
321	268	September 24, 2011	Speed Special #3	
321	268	September 24, 2011	Hanamana Season 3 #1	Park Hyo-jun, Kim Shin-young, Kim Young-choon, Lee Jung, Go Young-wook, Woo Seung-min, Jung Jae-hyung, Shin Se-kyung
322	269	October 1, 2011	Hanamana Season 3 #2	Park Hyo-jun, Kim Shin-young, Kim Young-choon, Lee Jung, Go Young-wook, Woo Seung-min, Jung Jae-hyung, Shin Se-kyung
323	270	October 8, 2011	Hanamana Season 3 #3	Park Hyo-jun, Kim Shin-young, Kim Young-choon, Lee Jung, Go Young-wook, Woo Seung-min, Jung Jae-hyung, Shin Se-kyung
323	270	October 8, 2011	Infinite Trading Company	
324	271	October 15, 2011	The 2011 Rabbit and the Turtle	
325	272	October 22, 2011	Best Friend #1	
326	273	October 29, 2011	Best Friend #2	
327	274	November 5, 2011	SAT Special	
328	275	November 12, 2011	TV War Special #1	
329	276	November 19, 2011	TV War Special #2	
330	277	November 26, 2011	2012 Calendar Model #1	
331	278	December 3, 2011	Myeong-su is 12 Years Old #1	
332	279	December 10, 2011	Myeong-su is 12 Years Old #2	
333	280	December 17, 2011	Haha VS Hong-chul #1	
333	280	December 17, 2011	Infinite Delivery #1	
334	281	December 24, 2011	Infinite Delivery #2	
334	281	December 24, 2011	I'm A Singer In My Own Right #1	
335	282	December 31, 2011	I'm A Singer In My Own Right #2	

=== 2012 ===
List of Episodes - Season 3 (2012) Episodes 283-310

Season 3 (2012)
#	Episodes #	Air Date	Synopsis	Guest/Notes
336	283	January 7, 2012	I'm A Singer In My Own Right #3	Jung Jae-hyung, Sweet Sorrow, Gaeko, Choiza, Bada, Norazo, Gary, Jung-in, Skull, Kim Sook, Song Eun-i, Kim Bum-soo
337	284	January 14, 2012	Infinite Company End of Year Ceremony	
338	285	January 21, 2012	Infinite Company 2012	
338	285	January 21, 2012	Haha VS Hong-chul #2	
339	286	January 28, 2012	Haha VS Hong-chul #3	
340	287		2012 Infinite News	There was a break of 6 months due to a strike in the company by the reporters and producers; Episode was broadcast online but not Aired
340	287		Highlight of Haha VS Hong-chul	There was a break of 6 months due to a strike in the company by the reporters and producers; Episode was broadcast online but not Aired
341	288	July 28, 2012	Haha VS Hong-chul #4	
341	288	July 28, 2012	Lee Na-young Special #1	Lee Na-young
342	289	August 4, 2012	Lee Na-young Special #2	Lee Na-young
343	290	August 11, 2012	Lee Na-young Special #3	Lee Na-young
343	290	August 11, 2012	Do As You Say #1	
344	291	August 18, 2012	Do As You Say #2	
345	292	August 25, 2012	2012 Infinite News	
345	292	August 25, 2012	You go to Hawaii #1	
346	293	September 1, 2012	You go to Hawaii #2	
347	294	September 8, 2012	You go to Hawaii #3	
347	294	September 8, 2012	As Promised #1	
348	295	September 15, 2012	As Promised #2	
349	296	September 22, 2012	As Promised #3 with Son Yeon-jae	Son Yeon-jae
350	297	September 29, 2012	Infinite Company with G-Dragon #1	G-Dragon
351	298	October 6, 2012	Infinite Company with G-Dragon #2	G-Dragon
352	299	October 13, 2012	Mr. Sun and Miss Moon	
353	300	October 20, 2012	300th Episode Pause Special #1	
354	301	October 27, 2012	300th Episode Pause Special #2	
355	302	November 3, 2012	The Temptations of Ahjummas	
356	303	November 10, 2012	Joint Security Area	
357	304	November 17, 2012	Introducing My Ugly Friends Festival #1	Kim Bum-soo, Kim Young-chul, Kim Je-dong, Kim C, Jo Jung-chi, Yoon Jong-shin, Lee Juck, Defconn, Ko Chang-seok, Kwon Oh-joong, K.Will
358	305	November 24, 2012	Introducing My Ugly Friends Festival #2	Kim Bum-soo, Kim Young-chul, Kim Je-dong, Kim C, Jo Jung-chi, Yoon Jong-shin, Lee Juck, Defconn, Ko Chang-seok, Kwon Oh-joong, Song Joong-ki
359	306	December 1, 2012	Introducing My Ugly Friends Festival #3	Kim Bum-soo, Kim Young-chul, Kim Je-dong, Kim C, Jo Jung-chi, Yoon Jong-shin, Lee Juck, Defconn, Ko Chang-seok, Kwon Oh-joong
360	307	December 8, 2012	The Wedding Bus	Haha's Wedding
361	308	December 15, 2012	Infinite Express #1	
362	309	December 22, 2012	Infinite Express #2	
363	310	December 29, 2012	Infinite Express #3	
363	310	December 29, 2012	How About This ?	

=== 2013 ===
List of Episodes - Season 3 (2013) Episodes 311-362

Season 3 (2013)
#	Episodes #	Air Date	Synopsis	Guest/Notes
364	311	January 5, 2013	Park Myeong-su's How About This? Showcase	
365	312	January 12, 2013	New York Style #1	
366	313	January 19, 2013	New York Style #2	
366	313	January 19, 2013	100-Minute Debate	
367	314	January 26, 2013	Vampire Hunting #1	Kim Bu-seon
368	315	February 2, 2013	Vampire Hunting #2	
368	315	February 2, 2013	2013 Lunar New Year Special	
369	316	February 9, 2013	Baseball Race Game	
370	317	February 16, 2013	Face Off #1	
371	318	February 23, 2013	Face Off #2	
372	319	March 2, 2013	Me 2012 VS Me 2013	
373	320	March 9, 2013	Infinite TAXI	
374	321	March 16, 2013	No StressTH!	
375	322	March 23, 2013	Hawaii Special - Waikiki Brothers #1	
376	323	March 30, 2013	Hawaii Special - Waikiki Brothers #2	
377	324	April 6, 2013	Hawaii Special - Waikiki Brothers #3	
377	324	April 6, 2013	Hide and Seek Special #1	
378	325	April 13, 2013	Hide and Seek Special #2	
379	326	April 20, 2013	Myeong-su is 12 Years Old Special - Lets Go To School~	Kim Kwang-kyu, Kim You-jung Appearance by Daisy Donovan who was reporting on Infinite Challenge for the UK Channel 4 documentary series The Greatest Shows on Earth.
380	327	April 27, 2013	Infinite Company 8th Anniversary Special - The Musical #1	
381	328	May 4, 2013	2013 Bingo! Special	
382	329	May 11, 2013	Korean History TV Lecture Special #1 - Idol Special	
383	330	May 18, 2013	Korean History TV Lecture Special #2	
383	330	May 18, 2013	Going Going Completely Gone #1	
384	331	May 25, 2013	Going Going Completely Gone #2	
385	332	June 1, 2013	Infinite Company 8th Anniversary - The Musical #2	
386	333	June 8, 2013	Infinite Company 8th Anniversary - The Musical #3	
386	333	June 8, 2013	Minority Report #1	
387	334	June 15, 2013	Minority Report #2	
387	334	June 15, 2013	Hey! Where Are We Going ? #1	
388	335	June 22, 2013	Hey! Where Are We Going ? #2	
389	336	June 29, 2013	Minority Report #3	
390	337	July 6, 2013	We Need To Be Funny To Survive!	
391	338	July 13, 2013	Black versus White	
392	339	July 20, 2013	You're Definitely A Man	
393	340	July 27, 2013	The Famous 7 Princess	
394	341	August 3, 2013	Summer Variety Show Camp #1	
395	342	August 10, 2013	Summer Variety Show Camp #2	
396	343	August 17, 2013	Please Take Care Of Infinite Challenge #1	
397	344	August 24, 2013	Please Take Care Of Infinite Challenge #2	
398	345	August 31, 2013	Please Take Care Of Infinite Challenge #3	EXO
398	345	August 31, 2013	Infinite Challenge Cheerleader Team #1	
399	346	September 7, 2013	Infinite Challenge Night Club	BoA, G-Dragon, Kim C, You Hee-yeol, Primary, Rose Motel, Kiha & The Faces
400	347	September 14, 2013	Runaway with the Money Bag 2 - The Attack of the 100 Baldies #1	
401	348	September 21, 2013	Runaway with the Money Bag 2 - The Attack of the 100 Baldies #2	
402	349	September 28, 2013	2013 Infinite Challenge Freeway Song Festival #1 - First Meeting	BoA, G-Dragon, Kim C, You Hee-yeol, Primary, Rose Motel, Kiha & The Faces, Lee Juck
403	350	October 5, 2013	Infinite Challenge Cheerleader Team #2	
404	351	October 12, 2013	2013 Infinite Challenge Freeway Song Festival #2	BoA, G-Dragon, Kim C, You Hee-yeol, Primary, Rose Motel, Kiha & The Faces, Gaeko (Dynamic Duo), Defconn
405	352	October 19, 2013	2013 Infinite Challenge Freeway Song Festival #3	BoA, G-Dragon, Kim C, You Hee-yeol, Primary, Rose Motel, Kiha & The Faces, Sweet Sorrow
406	353	October 26, 2013	2013 Infinite Challenge Freeway Song Festival #4	BoA, G-Dragon, Kim C, You Hee-yeol, Primary, Rose Motel, Kiha & The Faces, Johan Kim, Gaeko (Dynamic Duo), Lee So-ra, Beenzino
407	354	November 2, 2013	2013 Infinite Challenge Freeway Song Festival #5 - The Concert	BoA, G-Dragon, Kim C, You Hee-yeol, Primary, Rose Motel, Kiha & The Faces; Feat. Johan Kim, Defconn, Lee So-ra, Beenzino, Gaeko (Dynamic Duo)
408	355	November 9, 2013	Physiognomy Special #1 & Intro to Jamaica and Milan Project	Skull
409	356	November 16, 2013	Physiognomy Special #2	
409	356	November 16, 2013	Game King Special (Manhunt) #1	Defconn
410	357	November 23, 2013	Game King Special (Manhunt) #2	Defconn
411	358	November 30, 2013	Modeling in Milan & Jamaica Singing Contest	Skull
412	359	December 7, 2013	12th Grade (SATs) & Intro to Lonely Buddy Festival	Defconn
413	360	December 14, 2013	Lonely Buddy Festival #1	Defconn, Kim Young-chul, Ji Sang-ryeol, Kim Je-dong, Oh Na-mi, Kim Ji-min, Park So-young, Park Ji-sun, Yang Pyung (Kiha & The Faces), Sunny (Girls' Generation), Park Soo-hong, Yoon Sang, So Ji-sub, Lee Dong-wook
414	361	December 21, 2013	Lonely Buddy Festival #2	Ji Sang-ryeol, Kim Young-chul, Kim Na-young, Park Hwi-sun, Yang Pyung (Kiha & The Faces), Sunny (Girls' Generation), Daesung (Big Bang), Narsha, Jin Goo, Ryu Seung-soo, Ahn Young-mi, Shin Sung-woo, Kim Je-dong, Hyun Sook, Jo Seung-goo, Jo Se-ho
415	362	December 28, 2013	Lonely Buddy Festival #3	Ji Sang-ryeol, Kim Na-young, Park Hwi-sun, Yang Pyung (Kiha & The Faces), Sunny (Girls' Generation), Daesung (Big Bang), Narsha, Jin Goo, Ryu Seung-soo, Ahn Young-mi, Shin Sung-woo, Jo Se-ho, Nam Chang-hee

=== 2014 ===
List of Episodes - Season 3 (2014) Episodes 363-410

Season 3 (2014)
#	Episodes #	Air Date	Synopsis	Guest/Notes
416	363	January 4, 2014	What If? #1	Jang Yoon-ju, Song Eun-i, Kim Sook
417	364	January 11, 2014	What If? #2	Jang Yoon-ju, Song Eun-i, Kim Sook, Baek Bo-ram, Jeong Ga-eun
418	365	January 18, 2014	What If? #3	Jang Yoon-ju, Je Yeong-jae (PD), Maeng Seung-ji, Park Ji-na (Korean classical musician)
419	366	January 25, 2014	Cheerleading Project 2014	Special appearance by BEAST, 4Minute, Apink, EXO, B1A4 at the end.
420	367	February 1, 2014	Year of the Horse	Jo Se-ho, Maeng Seung-ji, Do Dae-woong
421	368	February 8, 2014	Let's Throw Yuts - Let's Do Laundry Together	Jo Se-ho, Defconn
421	368	February 8, 2014	IC Detective Office	Pyo Chang-won; Special appearance by Hong Jin-young, Hong Seong-bin
422	369	February 22, 2014	Jamaica Special #1	Skull
422	369	February 22, 2014	Jae-suk, Where are we going? #1	
423	370	March 1, 2014	Jamaica Special #2	Skull; Special appearance by Usain Bolt
423	370	March 1, 2014	Jae-suk, Where are we going? #2	
424	371	March 8, 2014	Jamaica Special #3	Skull, TVJ Smile Jamaica Show Hosts and Production Team
424	371	March 8, 2014	Protect the Earth #1	
425	372	March 15, 2014	Protect the Earth! #2	Park Hyung-sik, Lee Sang-hwa
425	372	March 15, 2014	Speed Racer - Preparation Meeting	
426	373	March 22, 2014	Speed Racer #1 - Fast and Furious	Racecar Drivers - Kwon Bom-i, Kim Dong-eun, O Il-gi
427	374	March 29, 2014	Cheerleading Squad #1	Jung Il-woo, Park Shin-hye, Baro
428	375	April 5, 2014	Speed Racer #2	Racecar Drivers - Kwon Bom-i, Kim Dong-eun, O Il-gi
429	376	April 12, 2014	Speed Racer #3	Racecar Drivers - Kwon Bom-i, Kim Dong-eun, O Il-gi
430	377	May 3, 2014	Election 2014 #1 - The Choice	Gil leaves the program due to drunk driving.; Kim Bo-sung
431	378	May 10, 2014	Election 2014 #2 - The Campaign	
432	379	May 17, 2014	Election 2014 #3 - Behind The Scenes Dealings	
433	380	May 24, 2014	Hong-chul! Let's Get Married!	Ji Ho-jin; Subsequent episodes of this project were cancelled due to complaints that the episode blatantly objectified women
433	380	May 24, 2014	Election 2014 #4 - The Vote	
434	381	May 31, 2014	Election 2014 #5 - The Results	
434	381	May 31, 2014	Super Special Meeting with Kim Hee-ae	Kim Hee-ae, Kim Young-chul
435	382	June 7, 2014	We're Hungry Special	Yoon Do-hyun
436	383	June 14, 2014	Cheerleading Squad #2 - Pre Brazil	Jang Yoon-ju, Jung Il-woo, Son Ye-jin, Baro, Lizzy, Ji Sang-ryeol
437	384	June 21, 2014	Cheerleading Squad #3 - World Cup Begins	Jung Il-woo, Son Ye-jin, Baro, Lizzy, Ji Sang-ryeol, Kim Je-dong, Kim Bum-soo, Lee Guk-joo, John Park
438	385	June 28, 2014	Cheerleading Squad #4 - In Brazil	Jung Il-woo, Son Ye-jin, Baro
439	386	July 5, 2014	Speed Racer #4	
440	387	July 12, 2014	Speed Racer #5	
441	388	July 19, 2014	Speed Racer #6	
441	388	July 19, 2014	The Emergency Crisis Response Headquarters	
442	389	July 26, 2014	Bangkok Tour	
443	390	August 2, 2014	Midnight in Seoul	Danny Ahn, Joon Park, Son Hoyoung, Kim Je-dong, Ryu Seung-soo, Nam Chang-hee, Hong Jin-young, Lee Guk-joo, Kim Won-jun
444	391	August 9, 2014	The Heat Wave Era	
445	392	August 16, 2014	The Prisoner's Dilemma #1	
446	393	August 23, 2014	The Prisoner's Dilemma #2	
446	393	August 23, 2014	I Am Your Biggest Fan: Camping Special #1	
447	394	August 30, 2014	I Am Your Biggest Fan: Camping Special #2	
448	395	September 6, 2014	I Am Your Biggest Fan: Camping Special #3	
448	395	September 6, 2014	Radio Day Special #1	
449	396	September 13, 2014	Radio Day Special #2	Jun Hyun-moo, Kim Shin-young, Park Kyung-lim, Bae Chul-soo, Ji Sang-ryeol, Tablo, Jonghyun (SHINee), Sunny Hill
450	397	September 20, 2014	Radio Day Special #3	Jun Hyun-moo, Kim Shin-young, Lee Guk-joo, Lee Dong-wook, So Ji-sub, Park Gyuri, Jo Sungmo, Kim Do-hyang
451	398	October 4, 2014	Radio Day Special #4	Bae Chul-soo, Sunny (Girls' Generation), Tablo, Lee Juck, Jonghyun (SHINee), Byul
452	399	October 11, 2014	Hangul Special	
453	400	October 18, 2014	400th Episode Special: Begin Again #1	
454	401	October 25, 2014	400th Episode Special: Begin Again #2	
455	402	November 1, 2014	Special Exhibitions Episode #1	Lee Hyori, Lee Sang-soon
456	403	November 8, 2014	Special Exhibitions Episode #2: Saturday, Saturday's: I am a Singer	Ock Joo-hyun, Bada, Lee Jae-hoon, Kim Jo-han, Kangta, Shin Hye-sung, Lee Ji-hoon, Kim Jae-duc, Jang Su-won, So Chan-whee, Kim Hyun-jung, Seo Taiji
457	404	November 15, 2014	The War of Money #1	
458	405	November 22, 2014	The War of Money #2	
459	406	November 29, 2014	Extreme Part Time Jobs #1	Cha Seung-won; Noh Hong-chul leaves the program due to drunk driving.
460	407	December 6, 2014	Extreme Part Time Jobs #2	Cha Seung-won
461	408	December 13, 2014	The Giant of Seduction	Seo Jang-hoon
462	409	December 20, 2014	Saturday, Saturday's: I am a Singer #1	Kim Jong-kook, Kim Jung-nam, Jinusean, Bada, Shoo, Seohyun (via phone), Jo Sungmo, Lee Jung-hyun, Yoon Il-sang, Kim Gun-mo
463	410	December 27, 2014	Saturday, Saturday's: I am a Singer #2	Turbo - (Kim Jong-kook & Kim Jung-nam), Kim Hyun-jung, S.E.S. - (Bada & Shoo) with Seohyun, Lee Jung-hyun, So Chan-whee, Jo Sungmo, Kim Gun-mo, Jinusean, Uhm Jung-hwa, Cool with Yewon, Lee Bon

=== 2015 ===
List of Episodes - Season 3 (2015) Episodes 411-460

Season 3 (2015)
#	Episodes #	Air Date	Synopsis	Guest/Notes
464	411	January 3, 2015	Saturday, Saturday's: I am a Singer #3	Lee Bon (MC), Turbo (Kim Jong-kook, Kim Jung-nam), Kim Hyun-jung, S.E.S. (Bada, Shoo) with Seohyun, Cool (Lee Jae-hoon, Kim Sung-soo) with Yewon, So Chan-whee, Jinusean (Jinu, Sean), Jo Sungmo, Lee Jung-hyun, Uhm Jung-hwa, Kim Gun-mo
465	412	January 10, 2015	Home Alone Special	Seo Jang-hoon
466	413	January 24, 2015	I'm an Action Star	Jung Doo-hong, Heo Myeong-haeng
467	414	February 7, 2015	A Hard Day - Battle for the Box #1	
468	415	February 14, 2015	A Hard Day - Battle for the Box #2	
469	416	February 21, 2015	IC's Big Party #1	Seo Jang-hoon, Hyun Joo-yup, Kim Jin, Kim Young-chul, Kim Je-dong, Park Hyuk-kwon, Kang Kyun-sung, Lee Kyu-han, Go Kyung-pyo, Jung Yong-hwa, Seo Eunkwang, Hong Jin-kyung, and Park Seul-gi
470	417	February 28, 2015	IC's Big Party #2	Seo Jang-hoon, Hyun Joo-yup, Kim Jin, Kim Young-chul, Kim Je-dong, Park Hyuk-kwon, Kang Kyun-sung, Lee Kyu-han, Go Kyung-pyo, Jung Yong-hwa, Seo Eunkwang, Hong Jin-kyung, and Park Seul-gi
470	417	February 28, 2015	IC's Small Party	Kim Sung-soo, Pyo Young-ho, Lee Kyun, Jo Hye-ryun, Yoon Jung-soo, and Lee Yoon-suk
471	418	March 7, 2015	IC Daycare Center	Members become daycare teachers for one day; Special guest: Professor Oh Eun-young
472	419	March 14, 2015	Sixth Man - Secret Member #1	Jang Dong-min, Kim Young-chul, Jun Hyun-moo, Defconn, Hwang Kwanghee, Joo Sang-wook
473	420	March 21, 2015	Sixth Man - Secret Member #2	Hong Jin-ho, Lee Seo-jin, Hong Jin-kyung, Henry Lau, Kang Kyun-sung, Kim Ji-seok, Choi Siwon, Seo Jang-hoon, Niel, Kim Ji-hoon, Lee Gi-kwang, Park Jin-young, Yoo Byung-jae, Ryu Jeong-nam, Shin Soohyun
474	421	March 28, 2015	Sixth Man - Secret Member #3	Hwang Kwanghee, Kang Kyun-sung, Jang Dong-min, Hong Jin-kyung, Choi Siwon, Yoo Byung-jae, Seo Jang-hoon, Jun Hyun-moo
475	422	April 4, 2015	Sixth Man - Secret Member #4	Hwang Kwanghee, Kang Kyun-sung, Jang Dong-min, Hong Jin-kyung, Choi Siwon, Yoo Byung-jae, Seo Jang-hoon, Jun Hyun-moo
476	423	April 11, 2015	Sixth Man - Secret Member #5	Hwang Kwanghee, Jang Dong-min, Hong Jin-kyung, Kang Kyun-sung, Choi Siwon, Kang Kyun-sung, Kim Sook, Shin Bong-sun, Yoo Byung-jae, Mino, Lee Hoon, Lee Dong-jun
477	424	April 18, 2015	Sixth Man - Secret Member #6	Hwang Kwanghee, Jang Dong-min, Hong Jin-kyung, Kang Kyun-sung, Choi Siwon, Kim Sook, Shin Bong-sun, Yoo Byung-jae, Kim Bo-sung, Kim Chang-ryeol, Jang Do-yeon, Park Na-rae, Nam Chang-hee, Jo Jung-chi, Simon Yam; Jang Dong-min withdraw from the final voting due to his past misogynistic remarks controversy; Hwang Kwanghee is elected as the new member of Infinite Challenge
478	425	April 25, 2015	Desert Island II #1	
479	426	May 2, 2015	Desert Island II #2	
480	427	May 9, 2015	Welcoming Ceremony #1	
481	428	May 16, 2015	Welcoming Ceremony #2	
482	429	May 23, 2015	Welcoming Ceremony #3	
483	430	May 30, 2015	Extreme Part Time Job: Overseas Edition #1	
484	431	June 6, 2015	Extreme Part Time Job: Overseas Edition #2	
485	432	June 13, 2015	Real Bangkok Tour	
485	432	June 13, 2015	2015 First Half Infinite News	
486	433	June 20, 2015	IC Express Delivery - World Scholarship Quiz	Park Hyung-sik, Uee (voice only), Kim Je-dong
487	434	June 27, 2015	I Need Romance	Uee, Kim Je-dong, Ji Sang-ryeol, Kim Young-chul, Hong Seok-cheon, Song Eun-i, Kim Sook, Shin Bong-sun
488	435	July 4, 2015	2015 Infinite Challenge Yeongdong Expressway Song Festival #1	IU, G-Dragon & Taeyang, Park Jin-Young, Zion.T, Yoon Sang, Band Hyukoh; Yoo Hee-yeol, Lee Juck, Yoon Jong-Shin appeared as judges
489	436	July 11, 2015	2015 Infinite Challenge Yeongdong Expressway Song Festival #2	Musical Guest: IU, G-Dragon & Taeyang, Park Jin-Young, Zion.T, Yoon Sang, Band Hyukoh; Featuring: Yoo Jae-hwan
490	437	July 18, 2015	2015 Infinite Challenge Yeongdong Expressway Song Festival #3	Musical Guest: IU, G-Dragon & Taeyang, Park Jin-Young, Zion.T, Yoon Sang, Band Hyukoh; Featuring: Dok2, The Quiett, Beenzino
491	438	July 25, 2015	2015 Infinite Challenge Yeongdong Expressway Song Festival #4	Musical Guest: IU, G-Dragon & Taeyang, Park Jin-Young, Zion.T, Yoon Sang, Band Hyukoh; Featuring: You Hee-yeol, Lee Juck, Yoo Jae-hwan
492	439	August 1, 2015	2015 Infinite Challenge Yeongdong Expressway Song Festival #5	Musical Guest: IU, G-Dragon & Taeyang, Park Jin-Young, Zion.T, Yoon Sang, Band Hyukoh; Featuring: You Hee-yeol, Lee Juck, Beenzino, Yoo Byung-jae, Yoo Jae-hwan
493	440	August 8, 2015	2015 Infinite Challenge Yeongdong Expressway Song Festival #6	Musical Guest: IU, G-Dragon & Taeyang, Park Jin-Young, Zion.T, Yoon Sang, Band Hyukoh; Featuring: Beenzino, DAVINK, Spacecowboy, Ju Min-Jeong, Hyolyn, Yang Pyung, Yoo Jae-hwan
494	441	August 15, 2015	IC Express Delivery #1	
495	442	August 22, 2015	2015 Infinite Challenge Yeongdong Expressway Song Festival #7 - The Concert	Musical Guest: IU, G-Dragon & Taeyang, Park Jin-Young, Zion.T, Yoon Sang, Band Hyukoh; Featuring: DAVINK, Spacecowboy, Ju Min-Jeong, Hyolyn, Yang Pyung, Lee Juck, Yoo Jae-hwan
496	443	August 29, 2015	IC Express Delivery #2	
497	444	September 5, 2015	IC Express Delivery #3	
498	445	September 12, 2015	IC Express Delivery #4	Special appearance by President of Gabon Ali Bongo Ondimba
499	446	September 19, 2015	One-day Activity Schedule	Each member was given a set amount of money(KRW 10.000) to complete the schedule they planned themselves; Cameo: Hong Jin-kyung, Uhm Jung-hwa, Nam Chang-hee
500	447	September 26, 2015	Weekend Blockbuster	Members participating in dubbing Hollywood film Begin Again for MBC Chuseok Special; Jeong Hyeong-don couldn't participated for the latter part of the project due to pneumonia.; Guest: Ahn Ji-hwan, Bak Seon-yeong, Kim Yeong-seon, Bang Seong-joon, Choi Seok-pil, Lee Woo-shin, Yoon So-ra, Kim Seo-yeong, Jo Hyeon-jeong; Cameo: Kim Dong-wook, Yoo Jae-hwan
501	448	October 3, 2015	2015 Special Project Exhibition	Members were divided into three to come up with ten potential projects for the coming year. The projects were voted by online viewers and MBC PDs and the top three projects will go into production.
501	448	October 3, 2015	War of Idiots: Age of Innocence #1	Hong Jin-kyung, Eun Ji-won
502	449	October 10, 2015	War of Idiots: Age of Innocence #2	Recruitment of the Idiots Avengers Team Guest Members: Hong Jin-kyung, Eun Ji-won, Sol Bi, Shim Hyung-tak, Kan Mi-youn, Chae Yeon, Kim Jong-min
503	450	October 17, 2015	War of Idiots: Age of Innocence #3	Hong Jin-kyung, Eun Ji-won, Sol Bi, Shim Hyung-tak, Kan Mi-youn, Chae Yeon, Kim Jong-min, Park Na-rae
504	451	October 24, 2015	War of Idiots: Age of Innocence #4	Idiot Avenger Guests: Hong Jin-kyung, Eun Ji-won, Sol Bi, Shim Hyung-tak, Kan Mi-youn, Chae Yeon, Kim Jong-min, Park Na-rae; Brainiac Team Guests: Kim Gu-ra, Jun Hyun-moo
505	452	October 31, 2015	Funeral for Park Myeong-su's Laughter & Seeking Laughter Hunter	Funeral Guests: Yoo Jae-hwan, Lee Guk-joo, Park Na-rae, DJ Charles, Jo Se-ho, Kim Shin-young
506	453	November 7, 2015	Infinite Challenge Tour #1	Korean History Tour: Yoo Jae-suk, Hwang Kwanghee, Guest: Eric Nam; Korean Foodie Tour: Jeong Jun-ha, Haha, Guests: Sam Hammington, Sam Okyere, John Park; Korean Romance Tour: Park Myeong-su, Jeong Hyeong-don
507	454	November 14, 2015	Infinite Challenge Tour #2	Guests: Eric Nam, John Park, Yoo Jae-hwan; Jeong Hyeong-don leaves the show indefinitely due to health problems.
508	455	November 21, 2015	Infinite Challenge Dream #1	Members were auctioned off to other MBC produced shows, dramas, movies and radios; Son Yi-cheon - auctioneer, and 24 production teams with a total of 36 production crew
509	456	November 28, 2015	Infinite Challenge Dream #2	My Daughter, Geum Sa-wol - Yoo Jae-suk, Jeon In-hwa, Son Chang-min, Yoon Hyun-min, Baek Jin-hee, Lee Jae-jin (director), Park Ji-hyeon (head director); Daddy You, Daughter Me - Park Myeong-su, Yoon Je-moon, Shim Hyung-tak, Jung So-min, Kim Hyeong-Hyeop (director); Silver Green Home Is Good - Hwang Kwanghee, Choi Jae-hyeok (PD), Jung Jin-soo (reporter), Sung Jae-gyeong (ship captain); Life Risking Romance - Haha, Chen Bolin, Chun Jung-myung, Ha Ji-won, Song Min-gyu (director); My Little Television - Jeong Jun-ha, Nemo (Jeong Jun-ha's wife (voice only)), Kim Gu-ra, Seo Yu-ri, Lee Ha-neul, Park Jin-gyeong (director), Yoon Hee-na (writer)
510	457	December 5, 2015	Infinite Challenge Dream #3	Mystic TV: Surprise - Yoo Jae-suk, Park Myeong-su (Kim Min-jin, Jim Ha-yeong, Matthew Sleight, Vadim Sallayznave, Park Jae-hyeon, Song Yun-sang, Kang Yeong-seong - director, Jeong Seon-hui - Production PD); Find! Delicious TV - Park Myeong-su (Yoo Jae-suk, Jeong Jun-ha, Haha, Hwang Kwanghee(reinforcements), Kang Leo, Hong Jin-young); MBC Documentary Special - Haha (Man Chon (unknown rapper))
510	457	December 5, 2015	Zero Complaints #1	Production team try best to improve the working conditions for the members; Sa Hwa-gyeong (MBC local chief), Lee Ae-ran
511	458	December 12, 2015	Zero Complaints #2	Lee Ae-ran
511	458	December 12, 2015	2015 Second Half Infinite News #1	Dentistry - Jeong Jun-ha, Yoo Jae-suk (Dr. Ahn Sang-cheol); Wig - Park Myeong-su (Director Kim Tae-hwon)
512	459	December 19, 2015	2015 Second Half Infinite News #2	Acting Class- Hwang Kwanghee (Lee Sung-min, Yim Si-wan; SSD (Saturday Saturday Drama) - Park Myeong-su, Jeong Jun-ha, Yoo Jae-suk (Kim Hye-ja)
512	459	December 19, 2015	Wanted by Public #1	8 detectives from Busan Metropolitan Police Agency (2 people per team); Detective Team 1 - Park Seong-hyeon, Moon Hyeong; Detective Team 2 - Lee Do-gyeong, Kim In-tae; Detective Team 3 - Jeong Tae-u, Kang Dae-hyeon; Detective Team 4 - Lee Maeng-yeong, Yoon Mun-seong
513	460	December 26, 2015	Wanted by Public #2	8 detectives from Busan Metropolitan Police Agency (2 people per team); Detective Team 1 - Park Seong-hyeon, Moon Hyeong; Detective Team 2 - Lee Do-gyeong, Kim In-tae; Detective Team 3 - Jeong Tae-u, Kang Dae-hyeon; Detective Team 4 - Lee Maeng-yeong, Yoon Mun-seong

=== 2016 ===
List of Episodes - Season 3 (2016) Episodes 461-513

Season 3 (2016)
#	Episodes #	Air Date	Synopsis	Guest/Notes
514	461	January 2, 2016	Wanted by Public #3	8 detectives from Busan Metropolitan Police Agency (2 people per team); Detective Team 1 - Park Seong-Hyeon, Moon Hyeong; Detective Team 2 - Lee Do-gyeong, Kim In-tae; Detective Team 3 - Jeong Tae-u, Kang Dae-hyeon; Detective Team 4 - Lee Maeng-yeong, Yoon Mun-Seong
515	462	January 9, 2016	Entertainment General Assembly	Two assemblies. One discusses Infinite Challenge, the other discusses TV in general.; First part (IC Assembly) - Kim Tae-ho (Infinite Challenge PD), critics Jeong Deok-Hyun (popular culture critics), Wi Geun-woo (journalist) and Kim Gyo-Seok (TV columnist); Second part (General Assembly): 2015 Variety Superstar: Lee Kyung-kyu (Variety King), Kim Gu-ra, Kim Sung-joo, Yoon Jong-shin, Park Na-rae, Kim Young-chul, Seo Jang-hoon 2016 Variety Potential Talents: Yoon Jung-soo, Kim Sook, Yoo Jae-hwan, MC Gree (son of Kim Gu-ra), Shin Won-ho (via phone)
516	463	January 16, 2016	The Martian	Shim Hyung-tak, PD Park Chang-hun
517	464	January 23, 2016	Letters of Fortune
518	465	January 30, 2016	Variety School: School of Fun	Jack Black, Sam Okyere and Sam Hammington
519	466	February 6, 2016	Introducing My Ugly Friends Festival Season 2 #1	Baekhyun (EXO) (via phone); Short appearance, and invited, but did not appear for festival: Yoo Hae-jin, Kim Young-chul, Jang Hang-jun, You Hee-yeol‚ Bae Cheol-soo; Festival members: Jo Se-ho, Defconn, Kim Soo-yong, Ji Suk-jin, Woo Hyeon, Kim Hee-won, Bobby, Ha Sang-wook, Kim Tae-jin (musician), Lee Chun-soo, Byun Jin-sub, Lee Bong-ju
520	467	February 13, 2016	Introducing My Ugly Friends Festival Season 2 #2	Festival members: Jo Se-ho, Defconn, Kim Soo-yong, Ji Suk-jin, Woo Hyeon, Kim Hee-won, Bobby, Ha Sang-wook, Kim Tae-jin (musician), Lee Chun-soo, Byun Jin-sub, Lee Bong-ju; Additional guest performance: Zion.T
521	468	February 20, 2016	Introducing My Ugly Friends Festival Season 2 #3	Festival members: Jo Se-ho, Defconn, Kim Soo-yong, Ji Suk-jin, Woo Hyeon, Kim Hee-won, Bobby, Ha Sang-wook, Kim Tae-jin (musician), Lee Chun-soo, Byun Jin-sub, Lee Bong-ju
522	469	February 27, 2016	The Bad Memory Eraser #1	Mentors: Cho Chung-min, Kim Byung-hu, Kim Hyun-jung, Yoon Tae-ho, Haemin (Monk)
523	470	March 5, 2016	The Bad Memory Eraser #2	Sam Hammington
523	470	March 5, 2016	The Ratings Special Forces #1	Lee Sang-joo, Lim Sung-eun
524	471	March 12, 2016	The Ratings Special Forces #2	Lee Bong-ju
525	472	March 19, 2016	Master of Hip-Hop - MC Minzy	Zico, DJ Millic
526	473	March 26, 2016	Wedding Singers #1	Sung Si-kyung, Jung Sung-hwa, Jung Sang-hoon, Lee Joon, Yoon Doo-joon, Jung Yong-hwa, Jang Beom-joon
527	474	April 2, 2016	Wedding Singers #2	Kim Hee-ae, Byul
527	474	April 2, 2016	Perfect Sense #1	Zico, Yang Se-hyung
528	475	April 9, 2016	Perfect Sense #2	Zico, Yang Se-hyung; Appearances by GFriend, Charming Choi (magician), and impersonators Jeong Jong-cheol, Jung Sung-ho, Kim Hak-do and Ahn Yoon-sang
529	476	April 16, 2016	Perfect Sense #3
529	476	April 16, 2016	Saturday, Saturday's, I Am A Singer 2: Sechs Kies #1	Sechs Kies
530	477	April 23, 2016	Saturday, Saturday's, I Am A Singer 2: Sechs Kies #2	Sechs Kies
531	478	April 30, 2016	Saturday, Saturday's, I Am A Singer 2: Sechs Kies #3	Sechs Kies
532	479	May 7, 2016	2016 Infinite Company	Yang Se-hyung, Kim Eun-hee, Jang Hang-jun, Jang Won-seok (film producer)
533	480	May 14, 2016	Wedding Singers #3	Jang Beom-joon, Byul, Lee Juck, Kim Hee-ae, Jung Yong-hwa, Yoon Doo-joon, Lee Joon, Jung Sung-hwa, Jung Sang-hoon
534	481	May 21, 2016	Wedding Singers #4	Jang Beom-joon, Byul, Lee Juck, Kim Hee-ae, Jung Yong-hwa, Yoon Doo-joon, Lee Joon, Jung Sung-hwa, Jung Sang-hoon
535	482	May 28, 2016	Wedding Singers #5	Jang Beom-joon, Lee Juck, Kim Hee-ae, Jung Sung-hwa, Jung Sang-hoon, Jo Se-ho
536	483	June 4, 2016	Relay Toon #1	Yang Se-hyung; Comics Artist: Yoon Tae-ho, Joo Ho-min, Byun Ji-min (Super Pink), Lee Mal-nyun, Kim Hee-min (Kian84), Jun Yong-sik (Gaspard)
537	484	June 11, 2016	Relay Toon #2	Yang Se-hyung; Comics Artist: Yoon Tae-ho, Joo Ho-min, Byun Ji-min (Super Pink), Lee Mal-nyun, Kim Hee-min (Kian84), Jun Yong-sik (Gaspard)
538	485	June 18, 2016	What Shall We Do Today? #1	Sam Hammington, Sam Okyere
539	486	June 25, 2016	What Shall We Do Today? #2	Sam Hammington, Sam Okyere
539	486	June 25, 2016	Relay Toon #3	Comics Artist: Kim Hee-min (Kian84)
540	487	July 2, 2016	Living as Yoo Jae-suk VS Living as Park Myeong-su	Yang Se-hyung, Kim Bo-kyung (IC staff), Jang Woo-sung (production assistant), Park Chang-hoon ('The Capable Ones' PD) & Kwon Seok (deputy general manager, MBC)
540	487	July 2, 2016	Relay Toon #4	Yang Se-hyung; Comics Artist: Lee Mal-nyun
541	488	July 9, 2016	Relay Toon #5	Yang Se-hyung; Comics Artist: Jun Yong-sik (Gaspard)
541	488	July 9, 2016	The Wailing #1	Yang Se-hyung
542	489	July 16, 2016	Relay Toon #6	Byun Ji-min (Super Pink)
542	489	July 16, 2016	The Wailing #2	Yang Se-hyung
543	490	July 23, 2016	Relay Toon #7	Comics Artist: Yoon Tae-ho; Yang Se-hyung
543	490	July 23, 2016	Dispute Resolution Committee #1	Yang Se-hyung, Kim Young-chul, Kim Hyun-chul
544	491	July 30, 2016	Relay Toon #8	Yang Se-hyung; Comics Artist: Joo Ho-min
544	491	July 30, 2016	Dispute Resolution Committee #2	Yang Se-hyung, Kim Shin-young
544	491	July 30, 2016	Heart Rate Hide & Seek #1	Yang Se-hyung, Jeong Hee-do (Tarot card master)
545	492	August 6, 2016	2016 Infinite News	Jeong Hyeong-don officially leaves the program after being on hiatus since November 2015.
545	492	August 6, 2016	Heart Rate Hide & Seek #2	Yang Se-hyung
546	493	August 13, 2016	L.A. Special #1	Kim Jong-kook, Zico, GFriend
547	494	August 20, 2016	L.A. Special #2	Yang Se-hyung, Phil Ahn Young (son of Ahn Changho), Philip Ahn Cuddy (grandson of Ahn Changho)
548	495	August 27, 2016	Making-of Infinite Company: Employees in Crisis	Yang Se-hyung, Kim Eun-hee, Jang Hang-jun, Jang Won-seok (film producer), Lee Je-hoon, G-Dragon, Kim Hee-won
549	496	September 3, 2016	Relay Toon: Results	Yang Se-hyung, Kim Yeon-koung
549	496	September 3, 2016	Infinite Company: Employees In Crisis #1	Yang Se-hyung, Jang Hang-jun (director), Kim Eun-hee (playwright), G-Dragon, Son Jong-hak, Kim Hee-won, Shin Dong-mi, Ahn Mi-na, Lee Je-hoon, Jeon Mi-seon, Jun Kunimura, Jun Suk-ho, Kim Hye-soo, Kim Won-hae, Jang Won-seok (executive producer), Park Jun-sik (PD), Lee Yeong-bin (cinematographer), Oh Seok-pil (lighting director)
550	497	September 10, 2016	Relay Toon: Punishment	Yang Se-hyung
550	497	September 10, 2016	Infinite Company: Employees In Crisis #2	Yang Se-hyung, Jang Hang-jun (director), Kim Eun-hee (playwright), Jun Kunimura, G-Dragon, Kim Hwan-hee, Jeong Hyeong-don, Kim Hee-won, Son Jong-hak, Shin Dong-mi, Jun Suk-ho, Ahn Mi-na, Jeon Mi-seon, Lee Je-hoon, Kim Won-hae, Kim Hye-soo, Jang Won-seok (executive producer), Park Jun-sik (PD), Lee Yeong-bin (cinematographer), Oh Seok-pil (lighting director)
551	498	September 17, 2016	Dancing King	EXO, Kyuhyun, Baek Koo-young (choreographer), Yang Se-hyung
552	499	September 24, 2016	War of the Gods #1	Yang Se-hyung, Hwang Jung-min, Jung Woo-sung, Ju Ji-hoon, Kwak Do-won, Jung Man-sik, Kim Won-hae
553	500	October 1, 2016	500th Episode Celebration	Yang Se-hyung
553	500	October 1, 2016	War of the Gods #2	Yang Se-hyung, Hwang Jung-min, Jung Woo-sung, Ju Ji-hoon, Kwak Do-won, Jung Man-sik, Kim Won-hae
554	501	October 8, 2016	Mudori Go #1	Yang Se-hyung, Kang Ma-ae (aerobics instructor), Park Ji-eun (dancer), Choi Song-hwa (dancer), Hwang Hye-young (dancer), Ham Ga-yeon (dancer), Kim Ji-ho (rowing coach)
555	502	October 15, 2016	Mudori Go #2	Yang Se-hyung, Kang Ma-ae (aerobics instructor), Park Ji-eun (dancer), Choi Song-hwa (dancer), Hwang Hye-young (dancer), Ham Ga-yeon (dancer), Kim Ji-ho (rowing coach), Son Star, Jo Kyung-ho (wrestler), Kim Min-ho (wrestler), Han Sang-bong (sky diving instructor), Moon Jung-jun
556	503	October 22, 2016	We Are Men of Nature	Yang Se-hyung
556	503	October 22, 2016	Gravity Special #1	Yang Se-hyung
557	504	October 29, 2016	Gravity Special #2	Yang Se-hyung
558	505	November 5, 2016	Gravity Special #3	Yang Se-hyung, Salizhan Sharipov
558	505	November 5, 2016	War of Idiots: Civil War	Yang Se-hyung
559	506	November 12, 2016	Hip Hop & History Special #1	Yang Se-hyung, Seol Min-seok; Musical Guest: Dok2, Gaeko, BewhY, Song Min-ho, Zico, DinDin
560	507	November 19, 2016	Hip Hop & History Special #2	Yang Se-hyung, Seol Min-seok, Kim Yeong-hyeon (screenwriter), Park Sang-yeon (screenwriter), Cho Jung-rae, Park Kyung-mok (museum director), Jun Chul-hong (screenwriter), Kim Eung-kyo (professor); Musical Guest: Gaeko, BewhY, Song Min-ho, Zico, DinDin
561	508	November 26, 2016	Tears of the Polar Bear #1	Jo Jun-muk (PD), Kim Jin-man (PD), Janice Martin, Kevin Burke
562	509	December 3, 2016	Tears of the Polar Bear #2	Kevin Burke
562	509	December 3, 2016	Yoo Jae-suk's Sad Day	Yang Se-hyung
562	509	December 3, 2016	Santa Academy #1	Yang Se-hyung
563	510	December 10, 2016	Santa Academy #2	Yang Se-hyung
564	511	December 17, 2016	Big Bang Special	Yang Se-hyung, Big Bang
564	511	December 17, 2016	Santa Academy #3	Yang Se-hyung
565	512	December 24, 2016	Santa Academy #4	Yang Se-hyung
565	512	December 24, 2016	Hip Hop & History Special #3	Dok2, Seol Min-seok
566	513	December 31, 2016	Hip Hop & History Special #4	Yang Se-hyung, Seol Min-seok; Musical Guest: Dok2, Gaeko, BewhY, Song Min-ho, Zico; Featuring: DinDin, Oh Hyuk (Hyukoh), Mad Clown, Lee Hi, Kim Jong-wan (Nell)

=== 2017 ===
List of Episodes - Season 3 (2017) Episodes 514-551

Season 3 (2017)
#	Episodes #	Air Date	Synopsis	Guest/Notes
567	514	January 7, 2017	Jeong Jun-ha's Daesang Project	Yang Se-hyung, Lee Kyung-kyu, Kim Jong-min, Shin Ji; Short appearances by Song Eun-jeong (Jun-ha's stylist), Choi Ja-young (MBC Every1 Main PD) (via phone)
568	515	January 14, 2017	What Is Your Name? #1	Yang Se-hyung, Kim Jong-min, Choi Min-yong, Jo Kwon
569	516	January 21, 2017	What Is Your Name? #2	Yang Se-hyung, Baek Chung-kang; Short appearances by Kim Jong-min (via phone), Jackson Wang, Byul (via phone)
570	517	February 18, 2017	Legend #1: Best 5 Characters	Yang Se-hyung; Infinite Challenge went for a 7-week hiatus to normalize the processes necessary to produce the show and to plan future projects. During 4 of those weeks, MBC aired 4 'Legend' episodes that looked back on the show's past with commentary from the members.; The viewers were asked about the best 5 characters created in Infinite Challenge, which were:-; 1. "Myeong-su is 12 Years Old" (Ep.278, 279; 2011); 2. "Infinite Company" (2011–2013); "Infinite Company Outing" (Ep.250; 2011) "Infinite Company with G-Dragon" (Ep.297, 298; 2012) "Infinite Company Musical" (Ep.327, 332, 333; 2013): 3. "The Temptation of Ahjummas" (Ep.302; 2012); 4. "General Park's Surprise Attack" (Ep.154; 2009); 4. "Manager Jeong is Buying!" (Ep.231; 2011)
571	518	February 25, 2017	Legend #2: Best 5 Chase Specials	Yang Se-hyung; The viewers were asked about the best 5 chase specials in Infinite Challenge, which were as follows: 1. "Catch the Tail Race" (Ep.169, 170; 2009); 2. "Run Away With the Money Bag Special" (Ep.110-112; 2008); 3. "Pimple Break" (Ep.158, 159; 2009); 4. "The Quarreling Brothers" (Ep.187, 188; 2010); 5. "Speed Special" (Ep.265, 267, 268; 2011)
572	519	March 4, 2017	Legend #3: Best 5 Real Variety Specials	Yang Se-hyung; The viewers were asked about the best 5 real variety specials in Infinite Challenge, which were as follows.; 1. "A Desert Island Special" (Ep.59, 60; 2007); 2. "Telepathy Special" (Ep.220, 221; 2010); 3. "Life Theater: Yes or No" (Ep.149, 150; 2009); 4. "The Fellowship of Ice" (Ep.15-17; 2006); 5. "Home Alone Special" (Ep.412; 2015)
573	520	March 11, 2017	Legend #4: Best 10 Slapstick Comedy	Yang Se-hyung; The viewers were asked about the best 10 slapstick comedy scenes in Infinite Challenge, which were as follows.; 1. "Rice Planting Special" (Ep.56; 2007); 2. "Kimchi Preparation Challenges" (Ep.30; 2006); 3. "Six Brothers and Sisters" (Ep.145; 2009); 4. "Farming Village Special" (Ep.25; 2006); 5. Heading the Water Balloons (Ep.6; 2006, 58; 2007); 6. "ChunHyang Special" (Ep.153; 2009); 7. "Waikiki Brothers" (Ep.322, 323; 2013); 8. "Badminton Challenge" (Ep.120; 2008); 9. "So Ji-sub Returns Special" (Ep.264; 2011); 10. "Alaska Special" (Ep.40; 2007)
574	521	March 18, 2017	Battle! Hanamana #1	Yang Se-hyung becomes a regular member.
575	522	March 25, 2017	Battle! Hanamana #2	Kim Kyung-ho, Park Wan-kyu, Ha Sang-wook, Kim Tae-jin (musician), Kim Tae-ho (Infinite Challenge PD); At the end of the episode, Hwang Kwanghee said farewell to the viewers. He left the show to serve his military duty.
576	523	April 1, 2017	IC comeback	Hwang Kwanghee's last appearance before his military duty.
576	523	April 1, 2017	People's Assembly #1	5 members from the National Assembly Park Ju-min, Democratic Party of Korea; Kim Hyun-ah, Liberty Korea Party; Lee Yong-ju, People's Party; Oh Shin-hwan, Bareun Party; Lee Jeong-mi, Justice Party
577	524	April 8, 2017	People's Assembly #2	5 members from the National Assembly Park Ju-min, Democratic Party of Korea; Kim Hyun-ah, Liberty Korea Party; Lee Yong-ju, People's Party; Oh Shin-hwan, Bareun Party; Lee Jeong-mi, Justice Party
577	524	April 8, 2017	PyeongChang 2018 Special #1	Park Bo-gum
578	525	April 15, 2017	PyeongChang 2018 Special #2	Park Bo-gum, Lee Yong (Bobsleigh coach), Won Yun-jong, Jun Jung-lin, Oh Jea-han, Kim Jin-soo (bobsledder); Short appearances by Kim Dong-hyeon (luger), Kim Ji-soo (skeleton racer)
579	526	April 22, 2017	PyeongChang 2018 Special #3	Park Bo-gum, Yuna Kim; Ice hockey players: Lee Young-jun, Shin Hyung-yun, Park Kye-hoon; Curling players: Kang Su-yeon, Shin Mi-sung
580	527	April 29, 2017	Truth or Dare Special	Short appearance by Kim Hyung-hee (behavior analyst)
581	528	May 6, 2017	One Fine Day	Seo Hyun-jin
582	529	May 13, 2017	Hidden Card #1	Kim Soo-hyun (via phone); Yang Se-hyung's comedian colleagues: Lee Sang-joon, Yang Bae-cha, Yang Ki-woong, Kim Wan-bae, Kim Seung-hee, Kim Myung-sun, Choi Sun-young, Kim Da-on; Yoo Jae-suk's friend: Noh Hong-chul (via phone); Haha's musician friends: King Kong, M. TySON, Ja Mezz, Jindotgae; Jeong Jun-ha's friend: Park Min-kyu (director)
583	530	May 20, 2017	Hidden Card #2	Yang Se-hyung's comedian colleagues: Yang Ki-woong, Kim Wan-bae, Kim Seung-hee; Haha's musician friends: King Kong, M. TySON, Ja Mezz, Jindotgae; Jeong Jun-ha's friends: Park Min-kyu (director), Noh Hyun-tae, Gil Gun, Bae Chil-soo
583	530	May 20, 2017	Future Entertainment Research Lab #1	Bae Jung-nam, Jinwoo (Winner), Moon Se-yoon, Yoo Byung-jae, DinDin, Crush; Short appearance by Kim Boo-kyung (Infinite Challenge writer)
584	531	May 27, 2017	Future Entertainment Research Lab #2	Bae Jung-nam, Jinwoo (Winner), Moon Se-yoon, Yoo Byung-jae, DinDin, Crush; Short appearance by Kim Yon-ja
585	532	June 3, 2017	2017 Infinite News	Short appearance by Hwang Kwanghee from a pre-recorded footage; Haha's friends: Han Jung-woo, Kye Ji-hyun, Park Geun-sik, Kim Hyun; Han Su-min (Park Myeong-su's wife), Byul
586	533	June 10, 2017	5 Drifted Boys	Paik Seung-ho (via video chat), Lee Sang-yong (Daehan Rafting leader); Short appearance by Hwang Kwanghee from a pre-recorded footage
586	533	June 10, 2017	Soo-hyun, Let's Bowl!	Kim Soo-hyun
587	534	June 17, 2017	Dancing with Hyori #1	Bae Jung-nam, Lee Hyori, Kim Seol-jin
588	535	June 24, 2017	Dancing with Hyori #2	Bae Jung-nam, Lee Hyori, Kim Seol-jin
588	535	June 24, 2017	Soo-hyun, It's a Surprise!	Bae Jung-nam, Kim Soo-hyun
588	535	June 24, 2017	Find the Delicious Food Truck #1	Bae Jung-nam, Kim Soo-hyun
589	536	July 1, 2017	Find the Delicious Food Truck #2	Bae Jung-nam, Kim Soo-hyun, G-Dragon (via phone)
589	536	July 1, 2017	Real Men #1	Bae Jung-nam
590	537	July 8, 2017	Real Men #2	Bae Jung-nam
591	538	July 15, 2017	Real Men #3	Bae Jung-nam
592	539	July 22, 2017	Real Men #4	Bae Jung-nam
592	539	July 22, 2017	An Unexpected Vacation	Managers & stylists of Infinite Challenge members
593	540	July 29, 2017	IC Summer Festival	Kim Shin-young, Hong Jin-kyung; Short appearance by JooE (Momoland)
594	541	August 5, 2017	Stephen Curry Special ( (United States) Basketball Player)	Bae Jung-nam, Nam Joo-hyuk, Seo Jang-hoon, Stephen Curry, Seth Curry, Brian Lee; Commentators: Heo Il-hoo, Choi Yeon-gil
595	542	August 12, 2017	LA LA Land Special #1	Bae Doona, Jack Black; Short appearance by Hwang Kwanghee from a pre-recorded footage; Short appearances by Kkwang PD (All the World's Broadcasts PD), Bae Jung-nam
596	543	August 19, 2017	LA LA Land Special #2	Short appearances by Liz Flahive, Carly Mensch, Michael Kelly, Drew Barrymore, Timothy Olyphant, John Murdy, Scott Clank Merin
597	544	August 26, 2017	IC Night #1: Jeong Jun-ha's Producer 101; Park Myeong-su's Fresh-men; Haha's Short Party	Jeong Jun-ha's guests: short appearances by PD Choi Min-geun, PD Kim Goo-san, PD Park Hyun-seok, PD Park Chang-hun, PD Han Dong-chul, PD Na Young-seok (via phone), PD Choi Young-in, PD Seo Hye-jin; Haha's guests: Yoo Byung-jae, Shorry (Mighty Mouth), Wanna One (Yoon Ji-sung, Ha Sung-woon, Hwang Min-hyun, Ong Seong-wu, Kim Jae-hwan, Park Ji-hoon, Park Woo-jin, Bae Jin-young, Lee Dae-hwi, Lai Kuan-lin), short appearances via phone by Lee Sung-mi, Taeyang (Big Bang), Taeil (Block B)
598	545	September 2, 2017	IC Night #2: Park Myeong-su's Fresh-men; Haha's Short Party; Yoo Jae-suk's Street Talk Show: Wait a Minute; Jeong Jun-ha's Producer 101; Yang Se-hyung's Defeat Yang Se Bari	Haha's guests: Yoo Byung-jae, Shorry (Mighty Mouth), Jo Se-ho, Taeyang (Big Bang), Taeil (Block B), Ha Sung-woon (Wanna One), short appearance by Lee Sung-mi; Yang Se-hyung's guests: Lee Si-eon, Park Na-rae, Lee Hong-gi (F.T. Island), Jung Joon-young, Sechs Kies (Eun Ji-won, Kim Jae-duck), commentators: Jeon Yong-joon, Jeong Joon, short appearance via phone by Shin Hye-sung (Shinhwa)
599	546	November 25, 2017	2017 Infinite News: Microphone On the Move: Wait A Minute; People's Assembly - Bills; PyeongChang 2018 Torch Relay	Jo Se-ho; Wait A Minute: Brief appearances by Kim Jin-ho (Jun-ha's manager), Baek Min-jung (former IC writer); People's Assembly: Park Ju-min, Lee Jeong-mi, Lee Yong-ju, Song Ki-seok, Kim Hyun-ah, Oh Shin-hwan; PyeongChang 2018 Torch Relay: Bae Suzy
600	547	December 2, 2017	Giddy Up! Rafting on Han River	Jo Se-ho; Brief appearance by Lee Sang-yong (Daehan Rafting leader) and brief appearance by Byul via the phone.
600	547	December 2, 2017	2018 College Scholastic Ability Test #1	Jo Se-ho
601	548	December 9, 2017	2018 College Scholastic Ability Test #2	Jo Se-ho
602	549	December 16, 2017	Comedy Ha and Su	Comedy Big League: comedians (Yang Se-chan, Moon Se-yoon‚ Lee Guk-joo‚ Hong Yoon-hwa, Ahn Yang-kyo, Kim Myung-seon, Choi Sung-min, Park Na-rae, Hwang Je-sung, Ha Chun-soo, Lee Yong-jin, Yang Bae-cha), Park Sung-jae (PD), hosts (Shin Young-il, Jeong In-young).
603	550	December 23, 2017	Q&A	Jo Se-ho, Rhyu Si-min, Song Eun-i, Kim Saeng-min, Yoon Jong-shin, Jin Seon-kyu
604	551	December 30, 2017	Here Comes Pacquiao's Fist #1	Jo Se-ho, Yoo Byung-jae, Manny Pacquiao, Choo Dae-Yeob, Ryan Bang

=== 2018 ===
List of Episodes - Season 3 (2018) Episodes 552-563 + 3 Special Episodes

Season 3 (2018)
#	Episodes #	Air Date	Synopsis	Guest/Notes
605	552	January 6, 2018	Here Comes Pacquiao's Fist #2	Jo Se-ho, Yoo Byung-jae, Manny Pacquiao, Ryan Bang, Choo Dae-yeob; Special appearances by commentators (Heo Il-hoo, Lee Sang-ho) and announcer Lee Won-seong
605	552	January 6, 2018	Unanswered Questions - Jo Se-ho's Change of Heart	Jo Se-ho becomes a regular member.; Lee Dong-wook
606	553	January 13, 2018	Ace the Interview	Jo Kyu-sung (Jo Se-ho's father); Interviewers: Cha Yoo-seon, Park Woong-suk, Baek Han-joo, Lee Eun-suk, Lee Tae-young, Han Myung-soo, Park Il-han, Lee Seung-hoon, Park Hee-heon, Kim Hyung-geun, Lee Ju-yeon, Kim Jun-beom
607	554	January 20, 2018	1 Hour Before #1	Haha: Skull (via phone); Yang Se-hyung: Jeju Air flight attendants (Lee Yoon-seok, Kim Il-gwan); Jo Se-ho: MBC News Today PDs (Ryu Do-hyun, Kim Yong-jin, Park Jung-hee), weather forecasters (Lee Gui-joo, Hyun In-ah), MBC News Today announcers (Park Kyung-chu, Im Hyun-ju)
608	555	January 27, 2018	1 Hour Before #2	Kim Seung-ryeol
609	556	February 3, 2018	In & Out	Brief appearance by IU (via phone)
610	557	February 17, 2018	Saturday, Saturday's, I Am A Singer 3: H.O.T. #1	H.O.T; Brief appearance by Park Ji-sun (via phone)
611	558	February 24, 2018	Saturday, Saturday's, I Am A Singer 3: H.O.T. #2	H.O.T; Brief appearances by Park Ji-sun, Kim Shin-young, and choreographers Baek Gu-young, Park Eun-yeob
612	559	March 3, 2018	Jo Se-ho's 100th Day Celebration	
612	559	March 3, 2018	I Wanna Be A Celeb	Celeb Five (Kim Shin-young, Song Eun-i, Shin Bong-sun, Ahn Young-mi, Kim Young-hee); Brief appearance by the Korean women's Curling team (Kim Eun-jung, Kim Kyeong-ae, Kim Seon-yeong, Kim Yeong-mi, Kim Cho-hi)
613	560	March 10, 2018	I Miss You, Friend #1	Kim Je-dong, Ji Sang-ryeol, Kim Min-jong, Kim Jong-min, Nam Chang-hee, Park Na-rae
614	561	March 17, 2018	Curlvengers	Korean women's Curling team (Kim Eun-jung, Kim Kyeong-ae, Kim Seon-yeong, Kim Yeong-mi, Kim Cho-hi, coach Kim Min-jung), commentators (Kim Na-jin, Jang Ban-seok); Brief appearances by Kang Daniel (via phone), Lee Tae-min (via phone)
615	562	March 24, 2018	I Miss You, Friend #2	Kim Je-dong and his family, Monk Do-um, Monk Hye-an; Brief appearances by Ji Sang-ryeol (via phone), Kim Dae-hyun (Jo Se-ho's manager)
616	563	March 31, 2018	I Miss You, Friend #3	Park Na-rae's family; Brief appearances by Park Na-rae (via video & phone), Kim Jong-min (via video), Kim Min-jong (via video & phone), Ji Sang-ryeol (via video)
-	SP1	April 7, 2018	13 Years of Saturdays #1 – 2005–2008	Kwon Seok (Rash Challenge PD), Kim Tae-ho (Infinite Challenge PD), Jang Yong-dae (Infinite Challenge Cinematographer)
-	SP2	April 14, 2018	13 Years of Saturdays #2 – 2008–2012	Kim Tae-ho (Infinite Challenge PD), Lee Kyeong-yeob (Infinite Challenge FD), Jang Yong-dae (Infinite Challenge Cinematographer)
-	SP3	April 21, 2018	13 Years of Saturdays #3 – 2012–2018	Kim Tae-ho (Infinite Challenge PD), Lee Si-yoo (Infinite Challenge costume designer)
