= I Am a Man (TV series) =

- I Am a Man title card
- Also known as: Yoo Jae-suk's I am a Man
- Genre: Talk show, entertainment show
- Directed by: Lee Dong-hoon
- Starring: Yoo Jae-suk; Im Won-hee; Kwon Oh-joong; Jang Dong-min; Heo Kyung-hwan
- Country of origin: South Korea
- Original language: Korean
- No. of seasons: 1 (Provisional)
- No. of episodes: KBS2: 20 + 1 Pilot; KBS World: 20 + 1 Pilot

Production
- Production locations: KBS Annex Building, Yeouido-dong, Seoul
- Camera setup: Multicamera setup
- Running time: 70 minutes
- Production company: Korean Broadcasting System

Original release
- Network: KBS2
- Release: 9 April 2014
- Release: 8 August – 19 December 2014

I Am a Man (Korean: 나는 남자다), also known as Yoo Jae-suk's I am a Man, is a South Korean talk show. Its initial (pilot episode) aired on 7 April 2014. The show's regular broadcast started on 8 August 2014, and ended on 19 December 2014.

The program airs on two channels, KBS2 and KBS World; the latter broadcasts the episodes several days after the former. As of 10 January 2015, there have been 20 episodes aired in KBS2 and 20 episodes on KBS World. The show is hosted by Yoo Jae-suk, Im Won-hee, Kwon Oh-joong, Jang Dong-min, and Heo Kyung-hwan. I Am a Man is intended largely for the male audience; female viewers are "welcome to watch it in secret."

I Am a Man's show theme is a show of men, by the men, for the men.

== Broadcast dates ==
| Broadcast Channel | Broadcast Date | Broadcast Time | Remarks |
|---|---|---|---|
| KBS2 | 9 April 2014 | Wednesday 23:10 – 00:30 | Pilot Episode |
| KBS2 | 8 August 2014 – 19 December 2014 | Friday 23:10 – 00:30 | Regular Episode |
| KBS World | 7 May 2014 | Wednesday 23:10 – 00:30 | Pilot Episode |
| KBS World | 27 August 2014 – 29 October | Wednesday 23:10 – 00:30 | Regular Episode |
| KBS World | 7 November 2014 ~ Present | Saturday 00:10 – 01:30 | Regular Episode |
| KBS World | 27 August 2014 – 2 November | Thursday 07:15 – 08:25; Sunday 15:20 – 16:30 | Re-run Regular Episode |
| KBS World | 10 November 2014 ~ Present | Monday 07:40 – 08:50; Friday 16:20 – 17:30 | Re-run Regular Episode |

Note:

- As of November 2014, some of the KBS World program schedule information may become outdated due to the new program line-up.
- The broadcast time is based on GMT +9 time zone (Korea, Japan, East Timor, Palau).

== Hosts ==
- Yoo Jae-suk
- Im Won-hee
- Kwon Oh-joong
- Jang Dong-min
- Heo Kyung-hwan
- Kim Je-dong (Regular member of I Am a Man Special – Man and women special)

Noh Hong-chul was offered to host the show, but had to be replaced by Kwon Oh-joong as he was unavailable due to the show's schedule conflict with another program he hosts, MBC's I Live Alone. He only appear on I Am a Man pilot episode.

== History ==
I Am a Man replaced Mamma Mia, a family show taken off air after its final episode on 19 March 2014.

One of I Am a Man's original hosts, Noh Hong-chul, was replaced by Kwon Oh-joong as his other show which he is now starring in, MBC's I Live Alone, occupied the same time slot.

TenAsia conducted an interview with I Am a Man's production director (PD) after the filming of I Am a Woman

I Am a Man aired its last episode on 19 December 2014. I Am a Man PD still discuss on extend this show to Season 2.

It was reported that KBS2's new program, Brave Family will take over the broadcast slot of I Am a Man before the show begins its second season.

== Filming location ==
I Am a Man's filming location is the KBS Annex Building located in Yeouido-dong, Seoul. The show is typically recorded on Sunday and aired on Friday.

== Pilot episode ==
The pilot episode of I Am a Man premiered on 9 April 2014 on KBS2, followed by its 7 May 2014 release on KBS World to estimate the show's potential audience. The pilot episode featured Bae Suzy, Yim Si-Wan and Koh Yu-Jin as special guests.

The pilot episode was preceded by a teaser trailer which introduced the hosts and presented the scope of the show.

The AGB Nielsen rating for the pilot episode was 4.1%.

== Regular show ==
The show was included in the KBS2 program lineup and began airing regularly on 8 August 2014 on KBS2, and on 27 August 2014 on KBS World.

== I Am a Woman special ==
I Am a Woman was recorded on 12 October 2014 and subsequently broadcast on 17 October 2014 on KBS2, and on 7 November 2014 on KBS World. The director of I Am a Man, PD Lee Dong Hoon, supervised the production of the I Am a Woman special. The show featured an audience of a hundred women who offered feedback on the I Am a Man show from a feminine perspective. The show reused four discussion topics from the previous I Am a Man episodes.

The special guests/performer for this special show was BEAST, a South Korean dance music group.

== List of I Am a Man episodes ==
| Episodes | Original Broadcast Date | | Theme (In Korean theme) | Guests/ Performers |
| Episodes | KBS World | KBS2 | Theme (In Korean theme) | Guests/ Performers |
|---|---|---|---|---|
| Pilot Episode | 7 May | 9 April | Culminated and came to stay & Tech Man Special (남중 & 남고 & 공대 나온 남자 특집) | Im Si-wan, Bae Suzy, Koh Yu-Jin |
| 1 | 27 August | 8 August | The only man in the world of women/ I'm the only guy at my work (청일점 특집) | Jeon In-hyeok, IU |
| 2 | 3 September | 15 August | What it is like to live as a tune-deaf/ Tone-deaf men who are scared of karaoke (음치 특집) | Kim Yeon-woo, Sistar |
| 3 | 10 September | 22 August | Men Who Lost More Than 10 kg (몸무게 10 kg 이상 감량한 남자 특집) | Moon Hee-joon, Girl's Day |
| 4 | 17 September | 29 August | Men Who Will Be Married Soon (예비 신랑과 그 남자들 특집) | Baek Ji-young, Noel |
| 5 | 24 September | 5 September | Men from the Countryside (상경남 특집) | Kim Yeong-cheol, Jung Eun-ji |
| 6 | 1 October | 12 September | Man with an unusual name (특이한 이름을 가진 남자 특집) | Dong Hyun Kim, Yu Sang Mu, Kara |
| 7 | 8 October | 19 September | Men Who Are Dating/Married To Older Women (연상녀와 결혼(연애)중인 연하남 특집) | Choi Hee, Sam Hammington |
| 8 | 15 October | 26 September | Men Who Look Young or Old (노안 또는 동안남 특집) | Park Eun-young, Son Jin-young |
| 9 (Note: Special appearance by Ahn Cheol-soo from Men from the Countryside and Pastor Ji Sangryeol from Men who Lost more than 10kg) | 22 October | 3 October | Men who look alike (닮은꼴남 특집) | Kim Tae-woo, Lee Guk-joo |
| 10 | 29 October | 10 October | Employment and War (취업준비생남 특집) | Kim Je-dong, Hong Jin-young |
| 11 (Note: 4 out of 10 (as of 10 October) topic theme was used in I Am a Woman special, which is unique name (episode 6), look-alikes (episode 9), tone deaf (episode 2), and girl-only school (pilot episode)) | 7 November | 17 October | I Am a Woman Special show (나는 여자다 특집) | Beast |
| 12 (Note: Park Min Goesu (I Am a Man audience on pilot episode) were invited as the single since birth) | 14 November | 24 October | The Single Man Special (The Single Since The Birth and The Broken-hearted Man) (모태솔로&이별한 남자 특집) | Shin Hyun-joon, Muzie |
| 13 (Note: Due to tight schedule, Dynamic Duo need to leave I Am a Man filming right before the secret talk starts) | 21 November | 31 October | Men who love Hip-Hop and Rock (힙합 그리고 록을 사랑하는 남자) | Dynamic Duo, Lee Yoon-suk, Crying Nut |
| 14 | 28 November | 7 November | Men who have unique jobs (나 이런 일 하는 남자다 특집) | Hong Jin-ho, Eun Ji-won |
| 15 | 5 December | 14 November | I Am a Man special – Men and women special part 1 (Men & women who live on their own) (남녀특집 1편 – 자취남녀 특집) | Kim Na-young, Kim Je-dong |
| 16 (Note: The schedule of broadcast date on 12 December is postponed to 15 December due to The 51st Annual Daejong Film Award was aired by KBS World) | 15 December | 21 November | I Am a Man special – Men and women special part 2 <I Am a Baseball Fanatic Special> (남녀특집 2편 – 프로야구 매니아 특집) | Choi Hee, Lee Jong-beom, Kim Je-dong, Kyung-suk Kim (Taemi), Bak Ki-ryang, Lee Ji-eun, Kang Yuni |
| 17 (Note: This episode is rated as 19 ages above only viewers by KBS2) | 19 December | 28 November | I Am a Man special – Men and women special part 3 <I Am an Alcohol Lover> (남녀특집 3편 – 주당남녀 특집) | Im Chang-jung, Choi Yeo-jin, Kim Je-dong |
| 18 | 26 December | 5 December | I Am a Man special – Men and women special part 4 (Men and Women Who Were Once Innocent) (남녀특집 4편 – 순진했던 남녀) | Kim Je-dong, Clara |
| 19 | 2 January 2015 | 12 December | I Am a Man Special – Men and women special part 5 (Men and women who like to travel/ I Am Wanderlust!) (남녀특집 5편 – 역마살 남녀) | Kim Sook, Song Eun-i, Kim Je-dong |
| 20 | 9 January 2015 | 19 December | Title Match (타이틀 매치 특집) | |

=== Plot ===
Plot summaries for the I Am a Man episodes aired on KBS World

| Episodes | Plot |
|---|---|
| Pilot Episode | 250 men who went to all-male schools and spent their entire lives in an all-male environment share their life experiences. |
| 1 | 147 men who grew up and lived in a female-dominated environment share their joys and agonies. |
| 2 | Tone-deaf men afraid of going to karaoke have their singing abilities assessed by Kim Yeonwoo, a wanna-be singer, and share what it is like to live with tone deafness. |
| 3 | Men who lost more than 10 kg of weight are invited to speak about weight-related issues, and discuss pros and cons of being on a diet. They are joined by a special guest, Moon Heejun. |
| 4 | Soon-to-be-married bachelors talk about marriage. They are joined by a female guest, Baek Jiyoung. |
| 5 | Country boys who moved to Seoul share their thoughts on big city life. They are joined by Kim Yeongcheol, a famous comedian. |
| 6 | Men with unusual names tell their stories. They are joined by two special guests: Yoo Sangmoo, a comedian, and Kim Donghyun, a mixed martial arts fighter. |
| 7 | Men in relationship with an older woman tell stories they wouldn't dare to share with their significant others. |
| 8 | Men who don't look their age tell us about the pros and cons of looking older/younger than you are. |
| 9 | Male celebrity look-alikes share their stories. Special guests include "Gandhi" and "Obama." |
| 10 | Men who had a hard time finding a job discuss their experiences. |
| 11 | In this I Am a Woman special, 100 women join the I Am a Man hosts and tell their stories. |
| 12 | In this 12th episode, 100 single men are talking about their lives being living as Single Since The Birth & The Broken-hearted Man. Guided by Muzie and Shin Hyun-joon as dating expert, they will tell I Am a Man audience on how to attract women. |
| 13 | men who love hip-hop and rock music talk about their love for music |
| 14 | This week, 100 men are invited to talk about their unique jobs. |
| 15 | In this man and women special part 1, from awkward situation between man and women turn into a hilarious situation and the best of the I Am a Man episoded |
| 16 | In this man and women special part 2, I Am a Man hosts meet guys and girls who love Baseball |
| 17 | In this man and women special part 3, they can't live without drinking alcohol. |
| 18 | In this man and women special part 4, I Am a Man hosts meet man and women who were innocent in the past. |
| 19 | In this man and women special part 5, they just not only roamed around Korea, but also all around the world. |
| 20 | Finally, after 20 episode, I Am a Man comes to an end. It's a title match between unique names, look-alikes, tone-deaf and fun-talented people |

== Ratings ==
| Episode Number | Original Broadcast Date | | AGB Nielsen Ratings | Official YouTube Link |
| Episode Number | KBS2 | KBS World | AGB Nielsen Ratings | Official YouTube Link |
|---|---|---|---|---|
| Pilot Episode | 9 April 2014 | 7 May 2014 | 4.1% | |
| 1 | 8 August 2014 | 27 August 2014 | 5.2% | |
| 2 | 15 August 2014 | 3 September 2014 | 4.2% | |
| 3 | 22 August 2014 | 10 September 2014 | 4.3% | |
| 4 | 29 August 2014 | 17 September 2014 | 3.7% | |
| 5 | 5 September 2014 | 24 September 2014 | 5.0% | |
| 6 | 12 September 2014 | 1 October 2014 | 5.8% | |
| 7 | 19 September 2014 | 8 October 2014 | 3.6% | |
| 8 | 26 September 2014 | 15 October 2014 | 3.8% | |
| 9 | 3 October 2014 | 22 October 2014 | 5.1% | |
| 10 | 10 October 2014 | 29 October 2014 | 4.9% | |
| 11 | 17 October 2014 | 7 November 2014 | 6.4% | |
| 12 | 24 October 2014 | 14 November 2014 | 3.5% | |
| 13 | 31 October 2014 | 21 November 2014 | 3.5% | |
| 14 | 7 November 2014 | 28 November 2014 | 4.9% | |
| 15 | 14 November 2014 | 5 December 2014 | 5.7% | |
| 16 | 21 November 2014 | 15 December 2014 | 4.3% | |
| 17 | 28 November 2014 | 19 December 2014 | 5.9% | |
| 18 | 5 December 2014 | 26 December 2014 | 5.3% | |
| 19 | 12 December 2014 | 2 January 2015 | 5.2% | |
| 20 | 19 December 2014 | 9 January 2015 | 5.8% | |

All ratings are from the original episode broadcast on KBS2.

Blue ratings denote the highest numbers the series has garnered.
Red ratings denote the lowest numbers the series has garnered.
(-) denotes that episode has not yet been aired in that channel
Note: Future broadcast dates are subject to change.
