= Kang Kyun-sung =

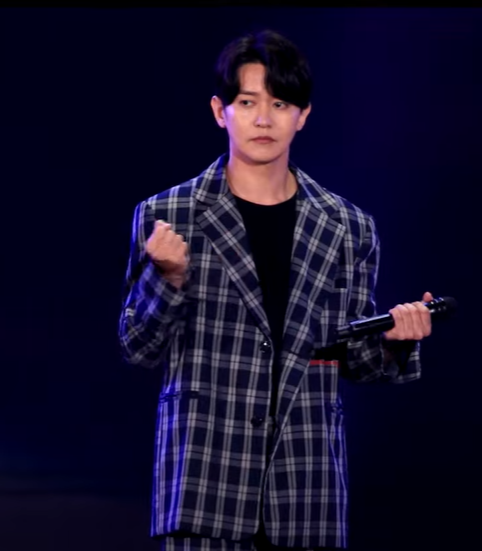

Background information
- Born: 1981 (age 43–44); Seoul, South Korea
- Genres: K-pop, R&B
- Occupation: Singer
- Years active: 2002–present
- Labels: JYP Entertainment; YNB Entertainment
- Member of: Noel
- Formerly of: JYP Nation

Kang Kyun-sung (Korean: 강균성) (born 1981) is a South Korean singer and television personality. He is a member of the boy band Noel and is a cast member in the variety show Off to School. He also appears in the music videos for Sistar's "Shake It" and Bestie's "Excuse Me". He has made appearances on Korean variety shows such as Knowing Bros, Running Man, and more recently South Korean Foreigners.

== Filmography ==
Variety and competition shows

Year	Title	Episode	Role	Notes
2015	King of Mask Singer	1, 17-18	Contestant	As House Out Lion and Smiley Face with Watermelon Seeds

=== Television drama ===
Year	Title	Role	Notes
2012	Reply 1997	young Sung Dong-il	Cameo (Episode 9)
2015	The Lover	Ryu Sung-kyun	Cameo (Episode 1)
2016	The Sound of Your Heart	Himself	Cameo
2018	Welcome to Waikiki	Himself	Cameo (Episode 10)
