= Lee Ae-ran =

North Korean activist

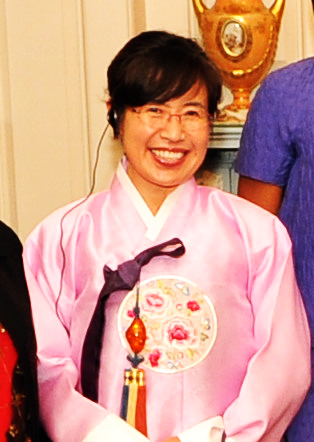

Korean name
- Hangul: 이애란
- Hanja: 李愛蘭
- RR: I Aeran
- MR: I Aeran

Lee Ae-ran (Korean: 이애란; born 1964) is an activist. After her grandparents defected to South Korea, she and her family were sent to a North Korean labor camp. She was imprisoned for eight years. In 1997, she ran away to South Korea after an American relative published a memoir stating that Lee's father was involved in anti-regime efforts.

In 2005, she founded the Global Leadership Scholarship Program, which grants North Korean students scholarships to learn English. In 2008, she became the first North Korean defector to run for a seat in the National Assembly. In 2009, Lee became the first female North Korean defector to earn a doctorate, which she earned from Ewha Womans University in the subject of food and nutrition. Also in 2009, she founded the Hana Defector Women's Organization, an NGO that gives North Korean women living in South Korea job training, childcare, educational support, and human rights training.

By 2012, she was in charge of the North Korean Traditional Food Institute, which gives vocational training to North Korean defectors and tries to bring North and South Korea closer by teaching about the food culture of Pyongyang. Also in 2012, Lee led an 18-day hunger strike in front of the Chinese embassy, against the repatriation of North Korean refugees held in China.

She received a 2010 International Women of Courage award.
