= Noel (band) =

South Korean boyband

- Noel in 2026

Background information
- Origin: South Korea
- Genres: K-pop, R&B
- Years active: 2002–2006, 2011–present
- Labels: JYP Entertainment; ITM Entertainment; YNB Entertainment; C-JeS Entertainment
- Members: Jeon Woo-sung; Lee Sang-gon; Na Sung-ho; Kang Kyun-sung

Noel (Korean: 노을) is a South Korean boy band consisting of Jeon Woo-sung, Lee Sang-gon, Na Sung-ho and Kang Kyun-sung.

== Discography ==
=== Studio albums ===
Title	Album details
Noel	Released: December 27, 2002; Label: JYP Entertainment, Iriver; Formats: CD, download
These Are The Times (아파도 아파도)	Released: May 27, 2004; Label: JYP Entertainment, Iriver; Formats: CD, download
Everything Was You (전부 너였다)	Released: February 10, 2006; Label: JYP Entertainment, Iriver; Formats: CD, download
Time for Love	Released: November 6, 2012; Label: ITM Entertainment, LOEN Entertainment; Formats: CD, download

=== Extended plays ===
Title	Album details	Peak chart positions	Sales
Title	Album details	KOR	Sales
Longing (그리움)	Released: October 26, 2011; Label: ITM Entertainment, LOEN Entertainment; Formats: CD, download	16	KOR: 2,466
Trace (흔적)	Released: November 27, 2013; Label: ITM Entertainment, LOEN Entertainment; Formats: CD, download	19	KOR: 1,092
Invisible Things (보이지 않는 것들)	Released: January 8, 2015; Label: YNB Entertainment, K&C Music; Formats: CD, download	11	KOR: 903

=== Single albums ===
Title	Album details	Peak chart positions	Sales
Title	Album details	KOR	Sales
Fading Away (떠나간다)	Released: April 19, 2012; Label: ITM Entertainment, LOEN Entertainment; Formats: CD, download	24	KOR: 1,364

=== Singles ===
Title	Year	Peak chart positions	Sales	Certifications	Album
Title	Year	KOR	Sales	Certifications	Album
"Even I Grab You" (붙잡고도)	2002	—N/a	—N/a	—N/a	Noel
"Although Ill, Although Ill" (아파도 아파도)	2004	—N/a	—N/a	—N/a	These Are The Times
"Everything Was You" (전부 너였다)	2006	—N/a	—N/a	—N/a	Everything Was You
"I Miss You" (그리워 그리워)	2011	2	KOR: 4,112,356	—N/a	Longing
"Fading Away" (떠나간다)	2012	6	KOR: 1,047,518	—N/a	Fading Away
"Lady" (여인)	2012	21	KOR: 238,539	—N/a	Time For Love
"Things I Couldn't Say" (하지 못한 말)	2012	2	KOR: 1,699,796	—N/a	Time For Love
"Love 911" (반창꼬)	2012	12	KOR: 704,371	—N/a	Non-album singles
"When the Night Comes" (밤이 오는 거리) feat. Dynamic Duo	2013	4	KOR: 498,297	—N/a	Non-album singles
"The Day" (그날이야)	2013	37	KOR: 77,656	—N/a	Non-album singles
"Your Voice" (목소리)	2015	2	KOR: 1,051,983	—N/a	Invisible Things
"In the End" (이별밖에)	2015	10	KOR: 378,889	—N/a	Non-album singles
"Hold My Hand" (손잡아요)	2016	81	KOR: 29,111	—N/a	Non-album singles
"Our Last Day" (그날의 너에게)	2018	88	—N/a	—N/a	Non-album singles
"How About You" (너는 어땠을까)	2018	23	—N/a	—N/a	Star
"Late Night" (늦은 밤 너의 집 앞 골목길에서)	2019	1	—N/a	KMCA: Platinum (Streaming)	Non-album singles
"Suddenly" (문득)	2020	21	—N/a	—N/a	Non-album singles
"Still Around You" (너의 곁에만 맴돌아)	2020	57	—N/a	—N/a	Non-album singles
"Saving All My Love" (지켜줄게)	2020	124	—N/a	—N/a	Non-album singles
"Unhateable" (미워지지가 않아)	2021	108	—N/a	—N/a	Non-album singles
"Saying Goodbye" (잊을 수 있을까)	2022	22	—N/a	—N/a	Non-album singles
"Everything" (그대가 있기에)	2022	87	—N/a	—N/a	Non-album singles
"I Will" (내가 그댈)	2022	170	—N/a	—N/a	Non-album singles
"If We" (우리가 남이 된다면)	2022	143	—N/a	—N/a	Non-album singles
"Please Come Back Again" (다시 와주라)	2023	120	—N/a	—N/a	Non-album singles
"How Are You?" (잘사니)	2023	100	—N/a	—N/a	Non-album singles
"Only" (단)	2024	105	—N/a	—N/a	Non-album singles

== Awards and nominations ==
Award	Year	Category	Nominated work	Result	Ref.
Golden Disc Awards	2021	Digital Bonsang	"Late Night"	Won	
Seoul Music Awards	2021	Best Ballad Award	Noel	Nominated	
