= Donghae-1 gas field =

Natural gas field in the Sea of Japan

- Country: South Korea
- Region: East Sea
- Offshore/onshore: offshore
- Operator: Korea National Oil Corporation

Field history
- Discovery: 1998-07-27
- Start of development: 2001
- Start of production: 2004-07-11

Production
- Current production of gas: 1.4×10^{6} m^{3}/d 50×10^{6} cu ft/d
- Estimated oil in place: 1.2 million barrels (~1.6×10^{5} t)
- Estimated gas in place: 7.1×10^{9} m^{3} 250×10^{9} cu ft

Donghae-1 gas field is located in the East Sea, about 60 kilometers from Ulsan Metropolitan City, South Korea's southern region. It was discovered in 1998 and developed by Korea National Oil Corporation. The natural gas field is operated and owned by Korea National Oil Corporation. The total proven reserves of the Donghae-1 gas field are around 250 billion cubic feet (7.1 billion m^{3}), and production is centered on 50 million cubic feet/day (1.4 million m^{3}).

Finally Donghae-1,2 Gas Field was end of Production on December 31, 2021, due to rapid depletion.

== History ==
- July 27, 1998: Exploration of the 50 km sea continental shelf 6-1 mine southeast of Ulsan Metropolitan City found a high-quality gas layer in four sections between 2,291 and 2,470 m in depth of the whale - v structure.
- 6 June, 1999: Finalized as economical in evaluation drilling.
- 23 Feb, 2000: Donghae-1 Gas Field Development Declaration
- March 15, 2002: Groundbreaking ceremony for gas production facilities.
- 26 Mar, 2003: Discovered an additional gas layer with a reserves of 1 million tonnes
- July 11, 2004: Begin the commercial production from Donghae-1 field 3 production wells (DH1 1P/2P/3P)
- November 5, 2004: Ceremony of completion
- Sep. 2011: Award of concession contract of 6-1C block for Donghae-2 development
- Dec. 2015-Jun. 2016: Donghae-2 production well drilling and production facilities installation
- Jul. 2016: Start Production from Donghae-2 field 1 production well (DH2 1P)
- Dec. 31, 2021: Donghae-1, 2 Production End.

== significance ==
With the development of this gas field, South Korea also joined the ranks of oil-producing countries, and some of the LNG was able to be procured domestically.

Over the 17 years leading up to the end of production on Dec. 31, 2021, it produced 41 million barrels of natural gas(in terms of crude oil) and 3.9 million barrels of Condensate, resulting in an import substitution of about $2.4 billion.

The investment amount is 1.2 trillion won, but the recovery amount is 2.6 trillion won, achieving a 220% recovery rate.
