= Kim Je-dong =

South Korean comedian and television host (born 1974)

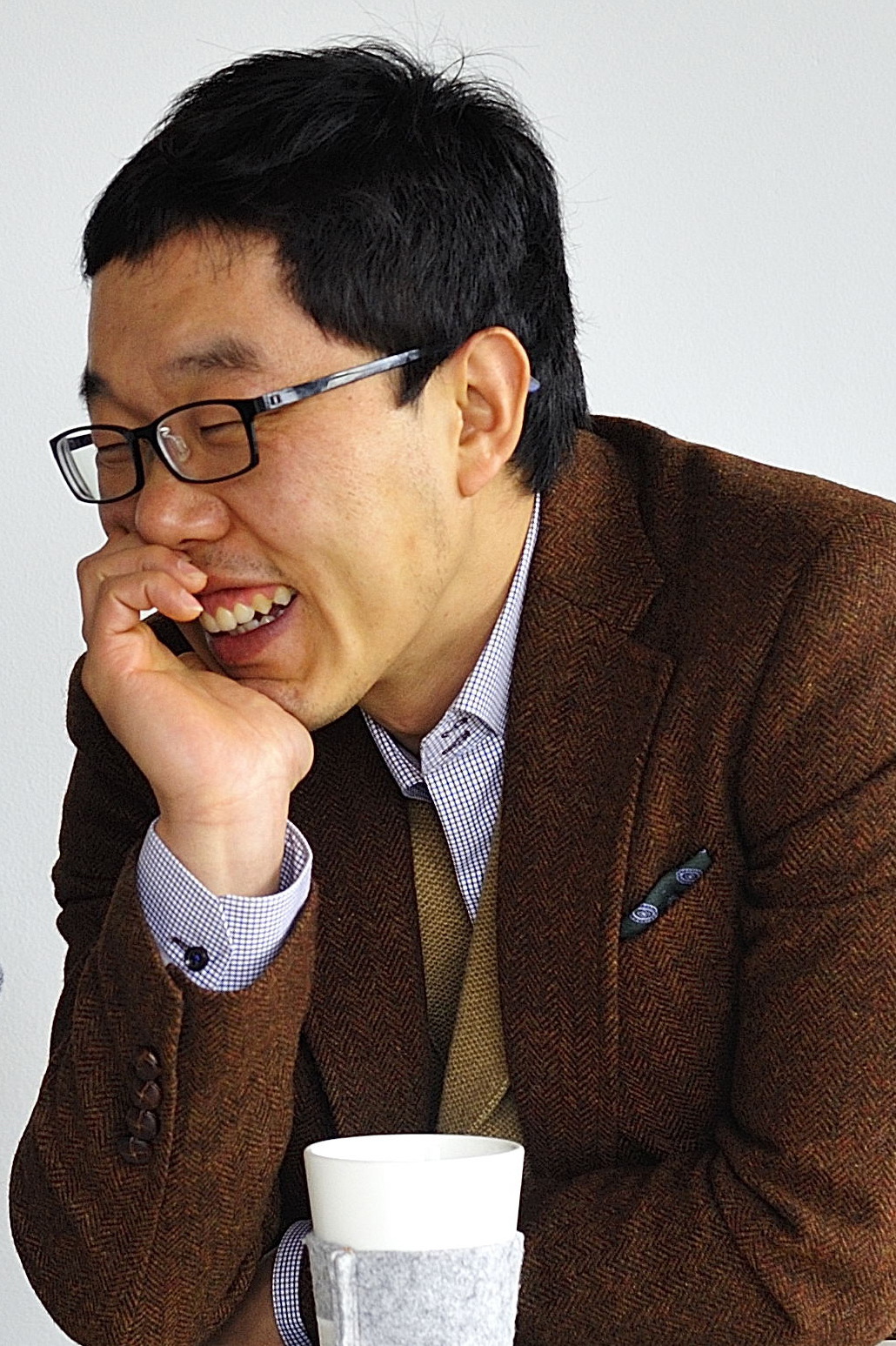
- Born: February 3, 1974 (age 52); Yeongcheon, North Gyeongsang Province, South Korea
- Education: Keimyung College University - Tourism; Sungkonghoe University - Journalism
- Occupations: Comedian, TV host
- Years active: 2002–present
- Agent: Daeum Entertainment

Korean name
- Hangul: 김제동
- Hanja: 金濟東
- RR: Gim Jedong
- MR: Kim Chedong

Kim Je-dong (Korean: 김제동; born February 3, 1974) is a South Korean comedian, variety and talk show host on television.

He is best known for hosting the talk show Healing Camp, Aren't You Happy on SBS.

== Career ==
Kim is also famous for being one of the few "socialtainers" in Korea (a portmanteau of social and entertainer), and has received public support for his social awareness and very controversial comments. Kim has urged people to vote, invested in the crowdfunded political film 26 Years, joined demonstrations for university tuition fee cuts and a reduction in carbon dioxide emissions, participated in flood damage restoration efforts, and has spoken out about cyberbullying, the reinstatement of laid-off shipbuilders at Hanjin Heavy Industries, the Yongsan disaster and the Ssangyong Motors labour strike. He is also known for being a vegetarian, and an eco-conscious advocate of hiking and biking. In 2011, he was included in a list compiled by Yonhap News of celebrities who "habitually" make donations to charity, and he ranked second (71.8%) in a survey of most trustworthy tweeters on political issues.

Despite Kim's reputation as an outspoken liberal, he was invited as one of the hosts of the presidential inauguration ceremony of conservative Lee Myung-bak in 2008. But in 2009, after he hosted the funeral memorial for the late president Roh Moo-hyun, Kim was fired from his highly rated quiz show Star Golden Bell on the state-run broadcasting network KBS. KBS claimed the dismissal was merely part of a program restructuring, but mounting speculation from netizens was that it had been politically motivated, and that Kim and his fellow liberal entertainers were being blacklisted by the Lee Myung-bak government. A year later, Kim had already recorded the first episode of his eponymously named Kim Je-dong Show on cable channel Mnet, but upon learning that Kim would host the upcoming one-year anniversary memorial service for Roh Moo-hyun, the cable company asked the comedian's agency to rethink Kim's participation in the memorial. When the agency refused, Mnet delayed the airing of the talk show's premiere in June 2010, citing rescheduling as the reason. Kim then decided to quit the program on principle. It was revealed in 2012 that Kim was among the TV personalities under illegal surveillance by the National Intelligence Service, causing him fear and anxiety. Despite the dwindling job offers resulting from his political stance, in a lecture in 2011, Kim told KAIST students to maintain humor and happiness amid "merciless reality." Kim said, "We're living in an unfortunate time for citizens right now, but it's a wonderful time to be a comedian. The material is inexhaustible. A reporter asked me why I keep engaging in political activity, and I said that while I haven't done that, comedy will quit politics once politics quits with comedy."

After he lost his jobs at KBS, Kim launched a stand-up show in 2009 at a small Daehak-ro theater. Called "talk concerts," Kim has since held these sold-out shows all over Korea and even in the United States, and in them he shares his views on the absurdities of society and politics, mixing funny anecdotes and insightful observations with biting social criticism.

In February 2010, he began to write for the Kyunghyang Shinmun, a newspaper in Seoul. He conducts witty interviews with experts in diverse fields such as politics, economics, society, and culture. 25 of these interviews were compiled into the 2011 book Kim Je-dong Is Coming to Meet You, and he donated proceeds from the book sales to underprivileged children with no access to cultural activities. He published another book, Kim Je-dong's Arms Around, in 2012.

One of the most popular segments of Kim's act is called "Quotations from Kim Je-dong," in which he makes ad-libbed witty remarks while performing live in response to questions he gets on the spot from the audience. To prepare, Kim said he reads newspapers of all kinds for 70 minutes every day and pastes clippings of editorials into a scrapbook, and writes down his own opinions on them. When asked the secret behind his popularity, he said that "viewers feel a sense of commonality and comfort from me."

== Variety shows ==
- Yoon Do-hyun's Love Letter (KBS, 2002-2005)
- Laughter Club (KBS, 2003-2006)
- 콜롬버스 대발견 (SBS, 2003)
- 청소년 특집 하이스쿨 기고만장 (MBC, 2003)
- 도전! 인간 복사기 (MBC, 2003)
- Ya Shim Man Man: Ten Thousand People Have Been Asked (SBS, 2003)
- 까치가 울면 (MBC, 2003)
- Yoon Do-hyun's 2 O'clock Date (MBC FM4U, 2003)
- Lee So-ra's FM Music City (MBC FM4U, 2003)
- Ock Joo-hyun's On a Starry Night (MBC Standard FM, 2003)
- 미주 이민 100주년 기념 뉴욕한인대잔치 (MBC, 2003)
- Happy Together (KBS, 2003-2004)
- Yoon Do-hyun's Love Letter - Kim Je-dong's Reply Talk (KBS, 2004)
- Real Situation Saturday - X-Man (SBS, 2004)
- 2004 MBC University Music Festival (MBC, 2004)
- Star Golden Bell (KBS, 2004-2009)
- Saturday (MBC, 2005)
- Happy Sunday - 해외입양아 상봉프로젝트 지금 만나러 갑니다 (KBS, 2005)
- 말 달리자 (MBC, 2005-2007)
- Happy Sunday - Choi Min-soo and Kim Je-dong's Manners Zero (KBS, 2006)
- Korea Music Awards (MBC, 2006)
- 설특집 - 전국 개그자랑 웃겨야 산다 (MBC, 2006)
- 특집 응원 Show Korea (MBC, 2006)
- 2006 독일월드컵 최종평가전 감동! 대한민국 (MBC, 2006)
- 느낌표 - 산넘고 물건너 (MBC, 2006-2007)
- Entertainment Weekly (KBS, 2006-2008)
- 환상의 짝꿍 (MBC, 2006-2010)
- Happy Sunday - Cool Times, Game Song (KBS, 2007)
- Sunday Sunday Night - 간다투어 (MBC, 2007)
- Sunday Sunday Night - 불가능은 없다 (MBC, 2007-2008)
- Sunday Sunday Night - 고수가 왔다! (MBC, 2008)
- Super Joint Concert (Mnet/KMTV, 2008)
- Ya Shim Man Man 2 - 예능선수촌 (SBS, 2008)
- Sunday Sunday Night - Rich Artifacts (MBC, 2009)
- 2009 팔도모창 가수왕 (MBC, 2009)
- Kim Je-dong's Golden Compass (SBS, 2009)
- Oh My Tent (MBC, 2009)
- 송년특집 - Goodbye 09 (MBC, 2009)
- 2010 Idol Star Athletics Championships (MBC, 2010)
- MBC Special - 칼라하리의 방랑자, 미어캣과 부시맨 (MBC, 2010)
- Running Man (SBS, 2010-2014); Ep.11, 21, 79, 106, 207
- 7 Day Miracle (MBC, 2010-2011)
- Night After Night (SBS, 2010-2011)
- King of Idol (SBS, 2011)
- 2011 Idol Star Athletics Championships (MBC, 2011)
- MBC Special 2011 신년특집 Ahn Cheol-soo and Park Kyung-chul (MBC, 2011)
- Sunday Night - I Am a Singer (MBC, 2011)
- Healing Camp, Aren't You Happy (SBS, 2011-present)
- 2012 Idol Star Athletics-Swimming Championships (MBC, 2012)
- Hwasin: Controller of the Heart (as Guest)(SBS, 2013)
- 2 Days & 1 Night (KBS, 2014)
- I Am a Man (KBS2, 2014)
- Kim Je-dong's Talk to You (JTBC, 2015)
- Kim Je Dong’s Talk To You 2 (JTBC, 2018-present)

== Radio show ==
Year	Title	Role	Note	Ref.
2021	Lee Sook-young's Love FM	Special DJ	2 August – 5 August	
2022	Kim Tae-hoon's Freeway	Special DJ	13 – 16 December	

== Talk concerts ==
- Kim Je-dong's No Brake Talk Concert - Season 1 (2009-2010)
- Kim Je-dong's No Brake Talk Concert - Season 2 (2010-2011)
- Kim Je-dong's No Brake Talk Concert - Season 3 (2011-2012)
- Kim Je-dong's No Brake Talk Concert - Season 4 (2013)

== Newspaper column ==
- Kyunghyang Shinmun - Kim Je-dong's Talk Talk Talk (2010-present)

== Books ==
- Kim Je-dong Is Coming to Meet You (2011)
- Kim Je-dong's Arms Around (2012)

== Awards and nominations ==
Name of the award ceremony, year presented, category, nominee of the award, and the result of the nomination
Award ceremony	Year	Category	Nominee / Work	Result	Ref.
Baeksang Arts Awards	2004	Best Male Variety Performer	Happy Together	Won	
KBS Entertainment Awards	2003	Best Male Newcomer	Kim Je-dong	Won	
KBS Entertainment Awards	2005	Excellence Award in a Variety Show	I'm Going to See	Won	
KBS Entertainment Awards	2006	Grand Prize (Daesang)	Kim Je-dong	Won	
Korean PD Awards	2010	TV Host Award	Kim Je-dong	Won	
MBC Entertainment Awards	2003	Best Newcomer in a Variety Show	Kim Je-dong	Won	
MBC Entertainment Awards	2003	Merit Award	Kim Je-dong	Won	
MBC Entertainment Awards	2005	Top Excellence Award in a Variety Show	Kim Je-dong	Won	
MBC Entertainment Awards	2007	Top Excellence Award in a Variety Show	Happy Time, Fantastic Mates	Won	
MBC Entertainment Awards	2018	Excellence Award in Radio	Good Morning FM, This Is Kim Je-dong	Won	
MBC Korean Language Awards	2008	Korean Language Expert Award – TV category	Kim Je-dong	Won	
SBS Drama Awards	2003	Special Award for TV MC	Ya Shim Man Man	Won	

=== Honors ===
Name of country or organization, year given, and name of honor or award
Country or organization	Year	Honor / Award	Ref.
Savings Day	2007	Presidential Citation	
