= Good Day (TV program) =

South Korean television program

- Promotional poster
- Hangul: 굿데이
- RR: Gutdei
- MR: Kuttei
- Genre: Variety show; Reality television; Music
- Presented by: G-Dragon
- Starring: Jung Hyung-don; Defconn; Jo Se-ho; Code Kunst
- Theme music composer: Iain Harper & Oswald Allicock
- Opening theme: It's All Good
- Country of origin: South Korea
- Original language: Korean
- No. of episodes: 8

Production
- Running time: 95 minutes
- Production company: TEO

Original release
- Network: MBC TV
- Release: February 16 – April 13, 2025

Good Day (Korean: 굿데이) is a South Korean variety show hosted by G-Dragon, the leader of the band Big Bang. It premiered on MBC TV on February 16, 2025, and is also available for streaming on Disney+ and iQiyi in selected regions.

== Background ==
Heralded as G-Dragon's inaugural solo entertainment show, Good Day—a variety program crafted in the format of a reality show— was helmed by Kim Tae-ho, the renowned producer of Infinite Challenge (2005–2018). It marked the two's first reunion since their long-standing collaborations on the program, including appearances in the show's music competitions and episodes like "Muhan Sangsa". This venture marks Kim's first return to MBC in three years since his last work Hangout with Yoo; before resigning from the broadcasting network in 2021 to establish his own production company TEO that same year.

The program's inception stemmed from an idea proposed by G-Dragon himself, inspired by his aspiration to use music for a "meaningful purpose".

== Overview ==
Good Day is a music project where G-Dragon, the "icon of an era", serves as a music producer. He collaborates with well-known figures from various fields to create a commemorative song for the year. The show will explore the creative process, capturing the transformation of personal stories into music; the song's profits is to be donated to charitable organizations. Furthermore, the venture presents a range of stories centered around G-Dragon, showcasing his daily life and interactions with various individuals from diverse fields.

== Cast ==
- G-Dragon
- Jung Hyung-don
- Defconn
- Jo Se-ho
- Code Kunst

== List of episodes ==
Ep.	Broadcast date	Guest(s)	Remarks	Ref.
1	February 16, 2025	Kian84, Kim Soo-hyun	Special guests: Taeyang, Daesung	
2	February 23, 2025	Hwang Jung-min, Kim Soo-hyun, Hwang Kwang-hee, Jung Hae-in, Im Si-wan, Lee Soo-hyuk		
3	March 2, 2025	Kim Soo-hyun, Jung Hae-in, Hwang Kwang-hee, Im Si-wan, Lee Soo-hyuk, Kian84, Hong Jin-kyung		
4	March 9, 2025	Kian84, Hong Jin-kyung, Ahn Sung-jae, Big Bang (Taeyang, Daesung), BSS		
5	March 16, 2025	Kim Go-eun, Jung Hae-in		
6	March 30, 2025	Aespa, Kian84, Kim Go-eun, BSS (Seungkwan, Hoshi), Ahn Sung-jae, Lee Soo-hyuk, Im Si-wan, Jung Hae-in, Hong Jin-kyung, Hwang Kwang-hee, Hwang Jung-min		
7	April 6, 2025	Aespa, Kian84, Kim Go-eun, BSS (Seungkwan, Hoshi), Ahn Sung-jae, Lee Soo-hyuk, Im Si-wan, Jung Hae-in, Hong Jin-kyung, Hwang Kwang-hee, Hwang Jung-min, CL, Day6, IU		
8	April 13, 2025	To be announced		

== Release ==
The variety show was broadcast domestically on MBC TV starting on February 16, 2025, and for streaming on Disney+ and iQiyi in selected regions. It ended on April 13, after 8 episodes. Following the show, the release of the Good Day 2025 song and music video is scheduled for April 24, and all proceeds will go toward supporting underprivileged children, teens, and communities in need.

In reaction to an ongoing scandal involving Kim Soo-hyun, and after consulting MBC and global OTT platforms airing the show, the production team has decided to edit episode 5 "urgently to remove Kim Soo Hyun's footage" the day before its release, making the episode "approximately 10 minutes shorter than usual and lacked some details", although two days before, on March 13, a representative from the show stated that the filming proceeded as scheduled with Kim Soo-hyun but his participation was minimized. On the 17th, with the controversy still growing, the production company announced via an official statement that they will edit out as much of Kim's screen time as possible going forward, prioritizing viewer reactions. In consequence, the individual recording session sequence involving Kim filmed on March 13 will not be aired, and episode 6, which was scheduled to air on March 23, has been postponed for a week to "reorganize the program".

== Reception ==
=== Viewership ===
Good Day : South Korea viewers per episode (thousands)

Season	Episode number								Average
Season	1	2	3	4	5	6	7	8	Average
1	1026	849	813	652	684	680	645	552	738

Source: Audience measurement performed nationwide by Nielsen Korea.

Average TV viewership ratings
Ep.	Original broadcast date	Average audience share (Nielsen Korea)	
Ep.	Original broadcast date	Nationwide	Seoul
1	February 16, 2025	4.3%	4.9%
2	February 23, 2025	3.6%	4.3%
3	March 2, 2025	3.9%	4.2%
4	March 9, 2025	3.0%	3.5%
5	March 16, 2025	3.1%	3.6%
6	March 30, 2025	3.0%	2.7%
7	April 6, 2025	3.0%	3.3%
8	April 13, 2025	2.7%	2.9%
Average		3.3%	3.7%
In the table above, the blue numbers represent the lowest ratings and the red numbers represent the highest ratings.
