= Hyungdon and Daejun =

South Korean duo

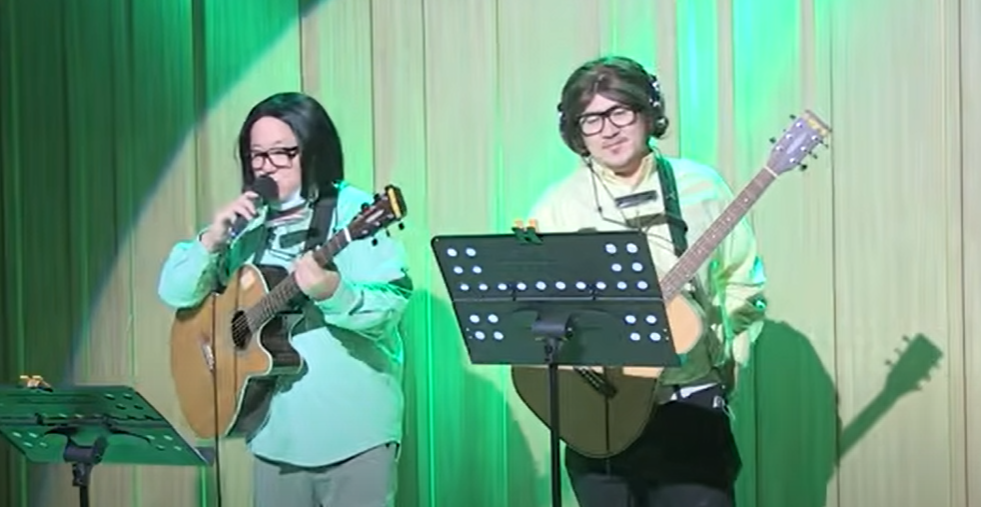
- Hyungdon & Daejune in 2021

Background information
- Origin: Seoul, South Korea
- Genres: Dance; hip hop; Comedy hip hop
- Years active: 2012–present
- Labels: D.I. Music
- Members: Jung Hyung-don; Yoo Dae-jun

Hyungdon and Daejun (Korean: 형돈이와 대준이) is a South Korean duo under D.I. Music consisting of comedic television personalities Jung Hyung-don and Yoo Dae-jun. They debuted on May 29, 2012, with "Olympic Expressway". They released their first EP, Gangstar Rap Bloom 1, on June 5, 2012.

== Discography ==
=== Extended plays ===
| Title | Album details | Peak chart positions | Sales |
| Title | Album details | KOR | Sales |
|---|---|---|---|
| Gangsta Rap Volume 1 (껭스타랩 볼륨1) | Released: June 5, 2012; Label: D.I. Music, LOEN Entertainment; Formats: CD, digital download | 23 | KOR: 1,392 |
| Sweet Gangsta Rap Volume 1 (스윗 껭스타랩 볼륨1) | Released: February 22, 2013; Label: D.I. Music, LOEN Entertainment; Formats: CD, digital download | 18 | KOR: 567 |
| Dark Gangsta Rap Volume 1 (닭크 껭스타랩 볼륨1) | Released: August 28, 2014; Label: D.I. Music, LOEN Entertainment; Formats: CD, digital download | 24 | KOR: 617 |

=== Singles ===
| Title | Year | Peak chart positions | Sales (DL) | Album |
| Title | Year | KOR | Sales (DL) | Album |
|---|---|---|---|---|
| "Olympic Expressway" (올림픽대로) | 2012 | 8 | KOR: 536,568 | Gangsta Rap Volume 1 |
| "The Gloomy Song" (안좋을때 들으면 더 안좋은 노래) | 2012 | 7 | KOR: 1,562,281 | Gangsta Rap Volume 1 |
| "Oh Yeah!" (오,예!) | 2012 | 20 | KOR: 325,191 | Non-album single |
| "Meet Me" (나 좀 만나줘) | 2013 | 36 | KOR: 120,794 | Sweet Gangsta Rap Volume 1 |
| "Get Out" (꺼져) | 2013 | 47 | KOR: 76,046 | Sweet Gangsta Rap Volume 1 |
| "Hemansahang" (희맨사항) | 2013 | 45 | KOR: 72,658 | Sweet Gangsta Rap Volume 1 |
| "Park You" (박규) | 2014 | 33 | KOR: 53,738 | Dark (dalk -chicken) Gangsta Rap Volume 1 |
| "Real Bad Girl" (확실하네) | 2014 | 96 | KOR: 24,621 | Dark (dalk -chicken) Gangsta Rap Volume 1 |
| "Choice" (결정) feat. IU | 2016 | 22 | KOR: 108,632 | Non-album singles |
| "Sexy Side" (예스빠라삐) | 2016 | — | — | Non-album singles |
| "Rap Impossible" (한 번도 안 틀리고 누구도 부르기 어려운 노래) | 2017 | — | — | Non-album singles |
| "Meet The Rose" (장미대선) feat. Lee Jin-ah | 2017 | — | — | Non-album singles |
| "Mountain Rabbit" (산토끼) with Rose Motel | 2017 | — | — | Non-album singles |
| "The King of Math" (중2 수학은 이걸로 끝났다) | 2018 | — | — | Non-album singles |
| "Secret Love Song" (니가 듣고 싶은 말) | 2018 | — | — | Non-album singles |
| "Can't Live Without You" (그대 없이는 못 살아) feat. Kei (Lovelyz) | 2019 | — | — | Non-album singles |
| "MUMBLE" | 2019 | — | — | MUMBLE |
| "Back 2 Me" (그린비 그미) | 2019 | — | — | MUMBLE |
| "Bye Bye Spring" (봄에 내기엔 늦었고 여름에 내기엔 좀 이른 노래) | 2021 | TBA | — | Jack & Dmitri (잭 & 드미츄리) |
| "Help Me, Buddha and Jesus" (처님 오신 날에 만난 기독교 그녀) | 2021 | TBA | — | Jack & Dmitri (잭 & 드미츄리) |
"—" denotes releases that did not chart.

=== Other charted songs ===
| Title | Year | Peak chart positions | Sales (DL) | Album |
| Title | Year | KOR | Sales (DL) | Album |
|---|---|---|---|---|
| "Yes Or No" (되냐 안되냐) | 2012 | 42 | KOR: 227,822 | Gangsta Rap Bloom 1 |
| "Hanshim Cart Bar" (한심포차) | 2012 | 50 | KOR: 178,859 | Gangsta Rap Bloom 1 |
