= Kim Tae-ho (television director) =

South Korean television director (born 1975)

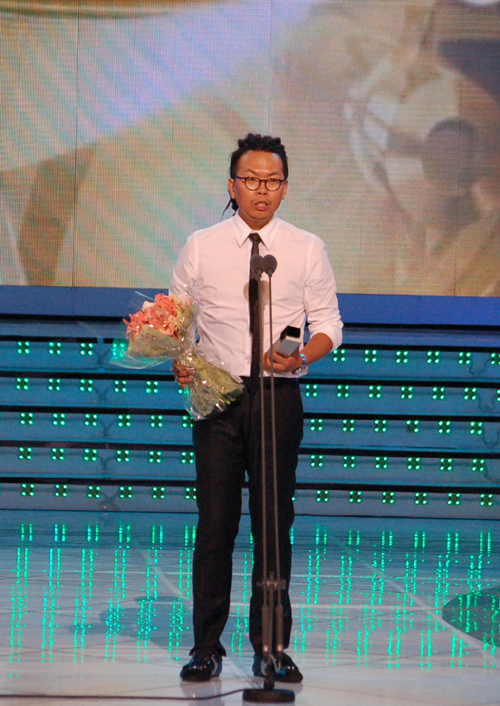
- Kim in 2009
- Born: Kim Tae-ho; May 4, 1975 (age 51); Daecheon (Boryeong), South Chuncheong, South Korea
- Education: Korea University - Bachelor of Journalism
- Occupation: Television director
- Years active: 2002–present
- Notable work: Infinite Challenge, Hangout with Yoo
- Spouse: Unnamed (m. 2009)
- Children: 1

Korean name
- Hangul: 김태호
- Hanja: 金泰浩
- RR: Gim Taeho
- MR: Kim T'aeho
- Website: www.cyworld.com/naomix75

Kim Tae-ho (Korean: 김태호; born May 4, 1975) is a South Korean television director.

== Early life and education ==
Kim was born in Daecheon, South Chungcheong Province (now Boryeong). He attended Daecheon Middle School, before moving to Gongju. South Chungcheong Province, at the age of 15.

He graduated from Kongju National University's College of Education High School and Korea University's Department of Journalism and Broadcasting.

== Career ==
After graduating, Kim joined the Munhwa Broadcasting Corporation (MBC) in 2002 and worked largely on the channel's Sunday night programs aired on Sunday Sunday Night.

He gained prominence amongst viewers as the director of Infinite Challenge due to his use of humorous subtitles and captions. His work on Infinite Challenge has garnered him popular and professional recognition and earned him nominations for various awards.

From September to November 2017 Kim was one of several thousand employees of MBC and KBS who participated in a joint labor union strike over unfair company practices at their respective broadcasting stations. He was reported to have won an award at the annual KCC Broadcasting Awards that August but refused to attend out of solidarity for his colleagues. As a result of the strike, popular programs on both MBC and KBS such as Infinite Challenge, Happy Together, Music Bank, Show! Music Core and others were canceled for up to twelve weeks.

On September 7, 2021, MBC announced that Kim would be leaving MBC by the end of that year.

Kim founded his own production company TEO in 2022 where he is currently the CEO.

== Personal life ==
In July 2009 Kim married his wife, a make-up artist. Their son was born in December 2014.

== Filmography ==
- Infinite Challenge
- Comedy House (Assistant Director)
- Nonstop 4 (Assistant Director)
- Saturday - Rash Challenge (Assistant Director)
- Sunday Sunday Night - Imagine Expedition
- Sunday Sunday Night - Live Cooking Show! Mr. King of Cook
- Sunday Sunday Night - Food Sports Mr. King of Cook
- Super Recommended Saturday - Excessive Challenge
- Super Recommended Saturday - Muhan Dojeon - Master of Quiz
- The Hungry and the Hairy (2020, Netflix)
- Funding Together (같이 펀딩) (August 2019~November 2019)
- Hangout with Yoo (July 2019 – December 2021)
- Seoul Check-in (2022, TVING)
- World Dice Tour^{*3} ^{seasons} (2023-2025, ENA, YouTube)
- My Name is Gabriel (2024, JTBC)
- Good Day (2025, MBC)
- The Secret Friends Club (2026, MBC)
- Crazy Tour (2026, ENA)

== Accolades ==
=== Awards and nominations ===
Ceremony	Year	Category	Work	Result	Ref.
44th Baeksang Arts Awards	2008	Award For Best TV Entertainment Programme	Infinity Challenge	Won	
22nd Korean Producers Grandprix Award	2010	Best TV Entertainment Programme	Infinity Challenge	Co-winner (Note: Award shared with entire directing members of Infinity Challenge))	
20th Korean Broadcasting Award	2008	Award For Best TV Entertainment Programme	Infinity Challenge	Won	
36th Korean Broadcasting Award	2009	Best TV Entertainment Programme	Infinity Challenge	Won	
36th Korean Broadcasting Award	2009	Director For TV Program	Infinity Challenge	Won	
MBC Broadcasting and Entertainment Award	2006	Best Programme; Voted By Netizen	Infinity Challenge	Won	
MBC Broadcasting and Entertainment Award	2007	Best Programme; Voted By Viewers	Infinity Challenge	Won	
MBC Broadcasting and Entertainment Award	2008	Best Programme Voted By Producers	Infinity Challenge	Won	
MBC Broadcasting and Entertainment Award	2009	Best Programme; Voted By Viewers	Infinity Challenge	Won	
MBC Programme Creating Award	2007	Meritorious Service Medal	Infinity Challenge	Won	
MBC Programme Creating Award	2007	Best Programme	Infinity Challenge	Won	
MBC Programme Creating Award	2007	Outstanding Entertainment Programme	Infinity Challenge	Won	
11th National Assembly Award	2010	For Best TV Programme of the Year	Infinity Challenge	Won	
CJ ENM Visionary	2020	Visionary	Kim Tae-ho	Won	

=== State honors ===
Name of country, year given, and name of honor
Country	Year	Honor	Ref.
South Korea (Note: Honors are given at the Korean Popular Culture and Arts Awards, arranged by the Korea Creative Content Agency and hosted by the Ministry of Culture, Sports and Tourism. They are awarded to those who have contributed to the arts and South Korea's pop culture.)	2021	Presidential Commendation	
