= My Name Is Gabriel =

2024 South Korean television show

- Promotional poster
- Hangul: My name is 가브리엘
- RR: My name is Gabeuriel
- MR: My name is Kabŭriel
- Genre: Reality; Travel
- Created by: Kim Tae-ho
- Written by: Jo Mi-hyeon
- Directed by: Kim Tae-ho
- Presented by: Defconn; Lee Hae-ri; Kang Min-kyung
- Starring: Park Bo-gum; Park Myung-soo; Yeom Hye-ran; Ji Chang-wook; Hong Jin-kyung; Dex; Gabi; Jennie
- Country of origin: South Korea
- Original language: Korean
- No. of episodes: 14

Production
- Producers: Kim Tae-ho; Lee Tae-kyung
- Running time: 54–68 minutes

Original release
- Network: JTBC
- Release: June 21 – October 4, 2024

My Name Is Gabriel (Korean: My name is 가브리엘) is a South Korean entertainment program created by Kim Tae-ho. It revolves around celebrities traveling abroad and experiencing the life of another person for 72 hours. It premiered on JTBC on June 21, 2024 for 14 episodes, and was streamed on Disney+ worldwide.

== Overview ==
In a foreign nation where no one recognizes them, well-known South Korean celebrities pretend to be someone else. By doing this, they spend three days living as their alter ego in a whole different culture, even taking on their job. Each experiment ends with them meeting the genuine person who is hiding behind their assumed identity.

== Cast ==
- Park Bo-gum, actor
- Park Myung-soo, comedian
- Yeom Hye-ran, actress
- Jinkyung Hong, model
- Ji Chang-wook, actor
- Dex, entertainer
- Gabi, dancer
- Jennie, singer

== Episodes ==
Episodes	Cast member	Counterpart	Profession	City
1–3	Park Bo-gum	Ruaidhri	Choir leader	Dublin
1–5	Park Myung-soo	Votty	Street vendor	Chiang Mai
4–6	Yeom Hye-ran	Qui Qianyun	Hotpot restaurant manager	Chongqing
7–9	Ji Chang-wook	Pipe	Agave farmer	Tequila, Jalisco
7–9	Jinkyung Hong	Kella	Model volunteer	Kigali
10–12	Dex	Lati	Wine tank manufacturer	Tbilisi
10–13	Gabi	Usiel	Street musician	Mexico City
13–14	Jennie	Maria	Bed and breakfast owner	Near Rome

== Reception ==
Per big data analytics firm Good Data Corporation, Park Bo-gum ranked 2nd in the list of "Most Buzzworthy Performers" (TV and OTT; Entertainment) during the show's premiere week, and ranked 3rd the week after. The show itself ranked 8th in the list of "Most Buzzworthy Programs" (TV and OTT; Entertainment) upon airing.

=== Awards and nominations ===
Award ceremony	Year	Category	Nominee	Result	Ref.
Blue Dragon Series Awards	2025	Best Variety Show	My Name Is Gabriel	Nominated	
Blue Dragon Series Awards	2025	Best Female Entertainer	Gabi	Nominated	
