= Happy Together (talk show) =

Television program

- Poster for Season 4
- Genre: Talk show
- Written by: Lee Min-jeong; Kim Min-ji; Shin Jae-kyung; Yang Gyu-ok; Noh Ji-yeon; Kim Do-eun; Jung Mi-rae
- Directed by: Park Min-jeong; Kim Hyung-seok; Shim Jae-hyun
- Presented by: Yoo Jae-suk; Jun Hyun-moo; Jo Se-ho
- Starring: List of guests
- Country of origin: South Korea
- Original language: Korean
- No. of seasons: 4
- No. of episodes: Special: 4; Season 1: 179; Season 2: 112 + 1 (Pilot); Season 3: 557; Season 4: 77; (list of episodes)

Production
- Executive producer: Lee Se-hee
- Running time: 95 minutes (normal); 90 minutes (special)
- Production company: KBS Entertainment Production

Original release
- Network: KBS2
- Release: November 8, 2001 – April 2, 2020

Happy Together (Korean: 해피투게더) is a South Korean talk show which first ran on November 8, 2001, on KBS2. It was the most popular show on KBS from 2002 to 2003, and continued its success in two more seasons. Happy Together is one of the most popular shows on Korean free-to-air networks which airs every Thursday at 23:05 (KST). The program celebrated its 200th episode during its third season on July 7, 2011.

== Format ==
=== Season 1 ===
Season 1 of Happy Together lasted 4 years from November 8, 2001, to April 28, 2005. It was the most popular season of the Happy Together series, the most popular variety show on KBS from 2002 to 2004, and the most watched on Thursday nights. Season 1 had several different "corners", the most famous being the Metal Tray Karaoke Room, and several other "corners" like Metal Tray Drama, and Do Re Mi "Kong Kong Kong". The early Happy Together was a talk show, and a quiz where the MC's face students for scholarships. Later that was scrapped and the Classroom Talk (책가방토크) and the Metal Tray Karaoke Room were implemented as permanent corners. During the season, the Metal Tray Karaoke Room corner didn't fill up the whole episode, so other games were added to fill the hour. A highlight episode was shown on April 28, 2005, as the finale to Season 1, where ratings were slightly lower than usual.

Slogan: "목요일 밤의 행복한 만남, 해피투게더!" (Thursday nights happy meeting, Happy Together!)

Metal Tray Karaoke Room

In the Metal Tray Karaoke Room (쟁반노래방), the guests would sing a song (usually a children's carol) in 10 turns, during which they have to sing every line correctly. 3 chance cards are available to ease the singing, and as soon as someone makes a mistake, the metal trays suspended above their heads will drop on them.

Metal Tray Drama

The Metal Tray Drama (쟁반극장) featured the two MCs (Shin Dong-yup, Lee Hyori) and two other guests, where they would be divided into two teams (1 MC, 1 guest) and act out a scene from a movie or drama. Usually involving funny antics, anyone who laughs or forgets what to do (known as NG) will be hit by a metal tray.

Do Re Mi Kong Kong Kong

Do Re Mi Kong Kong Kong (도레미 콩콩콩) was a corner which featured the Do Re Mi 7 Siblings (도레미칠남메) which contained the two MCs (Yoo Jae-suk, Kim Je-dong) and five other guests. They would participate in reciting a children's song using a human-sized keyboard hanging from the ceiling. They are each assigned a note (Do, Re, Mi, Fa, So, La, Ti, Do) and would have four chances to correctly play the song by hitting the corresponding key on the keyboard with their heads. If they are wrong, a group of punishers will hit them with a plastic mallet.

=== Season 2 ===
Season 2 was commonly known as Happy Together Friends (해피투게더 프렌즈), where celebrities find their former schoolmates. The program originally began as a pilot which aired in February 2005 titled Friends, hosted by Yoo Jae-suk, Eugene, and Tak Jae-hoon. It eventually combined with Happy Together to become Happy Together Friends. This season wasn't as humorous as the previous season, because most celebrities and schoolmates would usually cry or cherish their time together, greatly reducing the level of laughs. Season 2 ran from May 5, 2005, to June 21, 2007. Season 2 was not as popular as Season 1 but still gained the usual ratings range (10–18%). In Happy Together Friends, 2 celebrities are to find 5 of their schoolmates from a group of 25–40 people. Celebrities had 2 rounds to find their friends, their friends would speak about past events and their interesting stories, where the celebrities would try to clue in on the person. However, the celebrities only see the screen of the MC's and not the audience of schoolmates.

Slogan: "친구가 있어, 행복한 목요일, 해피투게더 프렌즈!" (Because friends are here, Thursday is happy, Happy Together Friends!)

Study Quick, If Incorrect, Metal Trays Will Hit!

In this game, Study Quick, If Incorrect, Metal Trays Will Hit! (벼락치기, 달달 외워~ 못 외우면 쟁반 맞아!) or in the pilot Study Quick, If Incorrect, Raise Your Hands! (벼락치기, 달달 외워~ 못 외우면 손들어!), the two celebrities and their friends will compete for a free dinner after the show so they can catch-up with each other. The object of the game is to correctly identify certain objects/people after studying for 30 minutes. A picture of the object/person is put on to a conveyor belt and it passes through each participant while they are wearing headphones, they must correctly identify what it is or be hit by the Metal Trays (or be forced to raise their hands in the pilot). The team with the most points will win the free dinner. This game was only played 4 times (including the pilot).

=== Season 3 ===
Season 3 which was known as Happy Together: Let's Go To School (해피투게더 학교가자), where the 4 MCs dressed as females (except for Shin Bong-sun, who is female), and participated in school-themed games. Season 3 included a corner from Season 1, where the MCs would play against students in a quiz for a scholarship. This began on July 5, 2007. These proved to be unpopular and were all scrapped in 3 weeks. Now, the show is simply known as Happy Together Season 3 which the corners are Challenge! Memorize Song, and That's You! (그건 너!). These 2 corners proved to be popular, and ratings have gone back to normal. That's You! has been replaced by What is that! (이건 뭐!), where guests bring an item they cherish, and Don't Laugh in the Sauna!, joined the 2 remaining corners that take place in a sauna. In early 2009, Challenge! Memorize Song was removed to save time. Only Don't Laugh in the Sauna! remains, and follows Star Quiz How is that Possible! (스타퀴즈 세상에이럴수가!) which is a quiz about the guests for daily products. On April 25, 2017, the show will undergo a revamp, one significant change is the show will be in the form of a 2-part series because most recordings go overtime.

Slogan: "함께하면 더욱 행복한 목요일 밤, 해피투게더!" (A Thursday night that will be happier if spent together, Happy Together!)

Challenge! Memorize Song

Challenge! Memorize Song (도전! 암기송) took place inside a sauna, where the MCs and guests would need to correctly sing a song (related to your well-being) to escape the sauna. Those who escape the sauna can enjoy food and drinks while watching the rest of the challengers suffer. The last person in the sauna is the loser and receives a painful massage.

Don't Laugh In The Sauna!

In Don't Laugh In The Sauna! (웃지마! 사우나), the hosts "chat" with the guests in a dialect trying to make them laugh. These conversations usually surround what a typical "Korean mother" (아줌마) will talk about, those who laugh will be sprayed by a water gun. Everyone has a plastic clear bowl they can use to protect themselves from the water. This corner takes place in the locker room of the sauna.

== Host ==
=== Season 1 – Happy Together ===
Main host

- Shin Dong-yup (Episodes 1 – 103)
- Yoo Seung-jun (Episodes 1 – 13)
- Lee Hyori (Episodes 23 – 103)
- Yoo Jae-suk (Episodes 104 – 179)
- Kim Je-dong (Episodes 104 – 179)

Special host

- Im Chang-jung (Episode 2)
- Yoo Jae-suk (Episode 4)
- Kim Tae-woo (Episode 13)
- Cha Tae-hyun (Episode 14)
- Kim Jang-hoon (Episode 17)
- Choi Soo-jong (Episodes 21, 23)
- Tim (Episode 132)

=== Season 2 – Happy Together Friends ===
Main host

- Yoo Jae-suk (Pilot, Episodes 1 – 112)
- Eugene (Pilot, Episodes 90 – 112)
- Tak Jae-hoon (Pilot, Episodes 1 – 52)
- Kim Ah-joong (Episodes 1 – 39, 41 – 52)
- Lee Hyori (Episodes 53 – 68, 70 – 89)
- Lee Soo-geun (Note: Both Lee Soo-geun and Shin Bong-sun served as a joint panel and were referred to as Class Presidents (반장).) (Episodes 54 – 104)
- Shin Bong-sun (Episodes 105 – 112)

Special host

- Hyun Young (Episode 69)

=== Season 3 – Happy Together Season 3 ===
Main host

- Yoo Jae-suk (Episodes 1 – 557)
- Park Myeong-su (Episodes 1 – 396, 398 – 425, 427 – 557)
- Park Jun-gyu (Episodes 1 – 28)
- Ji Sang-ryeol (Episodes 1 – 28)
- Shin Bong-sun (Episodes 1 – 357)
- Park Mi-sun (Episodes 29 – 417)
- Kim Shin-young (Episodes 358 – 417)
- Jo Se-ho (Episodes 358 – 557)
- Kim Poong (Episodes 418 – 437)
- Jun Hyun-moo (Episodes 418 – 557)
- Uhm Hyun-kyung (Episodes 438 – 557)
- Kim Soo-yong (Episodes 500 – 554)
- Kim Yong-man (Episodes 500 – 554)
- Ji Suk-jin (Episodes 500 – 554)
- Park Soo-hong (Episodes 501 – 554)

Subsidiary host

- Heo Kyung-hwan
- Choi Hyo-jong
- Jung Beom-gyun
- Kim Won-hyo

Special host

- Jo Woo-jong (Episode 397)
- Defconn (Episode 426)

=== Season 4 – Happy Together Season 4 ===
Main host

- Yoo Jae-suk (Episodes 1 – 77)
- Jun Hyun-moo (Episodes 1 – 77)
- Jo Se-ho (Episodes 1 – 77)
- Jo Yoon-hee (Episodes 10–48, 50–53)

Special host

- Ji Sang-ryeol (Episode 1)
- Minhyun (Wanna One/NU'EST) (Episodes 1, 30)
- JR (NU'EST W) (Episode 2)
- Sejeong (Gugudan) (Episodes 3, 54)
- Woohyun (Infinite) (Episode 4)
- Yook Sung-jae (BtoB) (Episode 7)
- Hwasa (Mamamoo) (Episode 8)
- Kim So-hyun (Episode 9)
- Cha Eun-woo (Astro) (Episode 10)
- Lai Kuan-lin (Episode 23)
- P.O (Block B) (Episodes 24, 52)
- Iz*One (Jang Won-young, Kim Min-ju) (Episode 27)
- Rowoon (SF9) (Episode 28)
- Lee Dong-gun (Episode 49)
- Boom (Episode 55)
- Jang Do-yeon (Episode 56)
- Hong Jin-kyung (Episode 57)
- Kwanghee (ZE:A) (Episode 58)
- Kang Daniel (Episode 59)
- Heo Kyung-hwan (Episode 60)
- Oh Hyun-kyung (Episode 61)
- Kim Kang-hoon (Episode 62)
- So Yoo-jin (Episode 65)
- So Yi-hyun (Episode 66)
- Chun Myung-hoon (NRG) (Episode 68)
- Oh My Girl (Hyojung, Mimi) (Episode 76)

== Competition ==
This programme has received the highest ratings of Thursday night prime-time lineups since its beginning. Every week, between 10 and 25 percent of viewers enjoy its episodes. Due to its popularity, programs on SBS and MBC at the 11:05 pm timeslot have suffered from Happy Together over the years.

SBS's People Searching for Laughter (웃찾사) once dominated Thursday nights in 2005, but ratings went down and it moved to different time slots (Sundays at 6:40 pm and Fridays at 9:55 pm). It later moved back to Thursdays at 11:05 pm in 2008 but ratings were still low, so it moved to Saturdays at 4:10 pm in 2010. Hey Hey Hey Season 2 (헤이헤이헤이 시즌2) began airing in 2006 but was cancelled after 9 months due to low ratings. Mystery Hunters (미스터리 특공대) and Love Generation (연애시대) began airing in 2008 and both were cancelled after 3 months due to low ratings. Entertainment Tonight (한밤의 TV연예) moved to that timeslot on SBS but is suffering from low ratings as well. Over on MBC, Dissatisfaction Zero (불만제로) aired for several years with low ratings and later moved to a new timeslot (Wednesdays at 6:30 pm) in an effort to boost ratings. It was replaced by cheaper news programming, Who Plus (후플러스) and continues to air with low ratings as well.

== Awards and nominations ==
Year	Award	Category	Recipient	Result	Ref.
2002	1st KBS Entertainment Awards	Grand Prize (Daesang)	Shin Dong-yup	Won	
2002	1st KBS Entertainment Awards	Best Program Award	Happy Together	Won	
2002	1st KBS Entertainment Awards	Rookie of the Year Award	Lee Hyori	Won	
2003	2nd KBS Entertainment Awards	Most Outstanding Award in Entertainment Category	Yoo Jae-suk	Won	
2003	2nd KBS Entertainment Awards	Most Outstanding Idea Award	Happy Together – Metal Tray Karaoke Room	Won	
2003	2nd KBS Entertainment Awards	Rookie of the Year Award	Kim Je-dong	Won	
2005	4th KBS Entertainment Awards	Grand Prize (Daesang)	Yoo Jae-suk	Won	
2005	4th KBS Entertainment Awards	Most Outstanding Award in Entertainment Category	Tak Jae-hoon	Won	
2007	6th KBS Entertainment Awards	Viewer's Choice Best Program Award	Happy Together Season 3	Won	
2008	7th KBS Entertainment Awards	Outstanding Award in Entertainment Category	Shin Bong-sun	Won	
2009	8th KBS Entertainment Awards	Outstanding Award in Entertainment Category	Shin Bong-sun	Won	
2009	8th KBS Entertainment Awards	Outstanding Award in Entertainment Category	Park Mi-sun	Won	
2010	9th KBS Entertainment Awards	Best Entertainer Award	Park Myeong-su	Won	
2010	9th KBS Entertainment Awards	Best Teamwork Award	Happy Together Season 3 team	Won	
2011	10th KBS Entertainment Awards	Outstanding Writer Award in Entertainment Category	Jo Ki-bum	Won	
2013	49th Baeksang Arts Awards	Grand Prize (Daesang) for Television	Yoo Jae-suk	Won	
2014	13th KBS Entertainment Awards	Grand Prize (Daesang)	Yoo Jae-suk	Won	
2014	13th KBS Entertainment Awards	Excellence Award in Entertainment Category	Kim Shin-young	Won	
2015	14th KBS Entertainment Awards	Top Excellence Award in Variety Show	Park Myeong-su	Won	
2016	15th KBS Entertainment Awards	Grand Prize (Daesang)	Yoo Jae-suk	Nominated	
2016	15th KBS Entertainment Awards	Viewers' Choice Best Program	Happy Together Season 3	Nominated	
2016	15th KBS Entertainment Awards	Top Excellence Award in Talk Show	Park Myeong-su	Nominated	
2016	15th KBS Entertainment Awards	Excellence Award in Talk Show	Jo Se-ho	Nominated	
2016	15th KBS Entertainment Awards	Excellence Award in Talk Show	Jun Hyun-moo	Won	
2016	15th KBS Entertainment Awards	Rookie Award in Talk Show	Uhm Hyun-kyung	Won	
2016	15th KBS Entertainment Awards	Best Teamwork Award	Happy Together Season 3 team	Won	
2018	16th KBS Entertainment Awards	Grand Prize (Daesang)	Yoo Jae-suk	Nominated	
2018	16th KBS Entertainment Awards	Viewers' Choice Best Program Award	Happy Together Season 4	Nominated	
2018	16th KBS Entertainment Awards	Top Excellence Award in Talk/Show Category	Jun Hyun-moo	Nominated	
2018	16th KBS Entertainment Awards	Excellence Award in Talk/Show Category	Jo Se-ho	Won	
2019	17th KBS Entertainment Awards	Best Teamwork Award	Happy Together Season 4 team	Won	
2019	17th KBS Entertainment Awards	Top Excellence Award in Entertainment	Jo Se-ho	Nominated	
