= Infinite Challenge =

South Korean variety show

- Promotional logo
- Also known as: Infinity Challenge; Muhan Dojeon
- Hangul: 무한도전
- Hanja: 無限挑戰
- RR: Muhandojeon
- MR: Muhandojŏn
- Genre: Reality television
- Created by: Kim Tae-ho (de facto)
- Directed by: Kim Tae-ho (Head dir.); Park Chang-hoon; Cho Wook-hyung; Kang Sung-ah
- Creative director: Kim Gu-san
- Starring: Yoo Jae-suk; Park Myeong-su; Jeong Jun-ha; Haha; Yang Se-hyung; Jo Se-ho
- Country of origin: South Korea
- Original language: Korean
- No. of seasons: 3
- No. of episodes: 563 + 3 specials (list of episodes)

Production
- Producer: Kim Tae-ho
- Camera setup: Multi-camera
- Running time: 75-80 minutes
- Production company: MBC Entertainment Production Division

Original release
- Network: MBC TV, MBC+ Drama, MBC every1
- Release: April 23, 2005 – March 31, 2018

Related
- Infinite Girls (spin-off), The Great Challenge

Infinite Challenge (Korean: 무한도전; RR: Muhandojeon; abbreviated as 무도; Mudo) is a South Korean comedic reality television show that aired on MBC TV from 2005 to 2018. The show was produced by Kim Tae-ho, and starred various entertainers, including Yoo Jae-suk, Park Myung-soo, Jeong Jun-ha, Haha, Jung Hyung-don, Noh Hong-chul, Jun Jin, Yang Se-hyung, Hwang Kwang-hee, Gill, and Jo Se-ho.

Infinite Challenge was marketed as "Korea's first reality-variety show", combining the humorous games of Korean variety shows with the intimate filming style of reality television. Each episode features cast members competing in challenges, including physical competitions and song contests.

Often called "the nation's variety show", Infinite Challenge was consistently popular in South Korea during its 13-year run. In 2008, the show reached its viewership peak, with nearly 30 percent of South Korean television viewers watching the program. The show was voted the country's favorite television program in both 2015 and 2016, according to polls conducted by Gallup Korea. Additionally, the show's song contests, which paired cast members with popular musical artists, spawned multiple top ten hits on the Gaon Digital Chart throughout the 2010s.

== Series overview ==
=== Episodes ===
Season	Episodes	Originally released	
Season	Episodes	First released	Last released
1	27	April 23, 2005	October 22, 2005
2	26	October 29, 2005	April 29, 2006
3	563	May 6, 2006	March 31, 2018

=== Season 1 ===
Infinite Challenge first aired under the name Reckless Challenge (무모한 도전) on April 23, 2005 during MBC TV's Saturday night programming block. The show was marketed as "Korea's first reality-variety show" and features people taking on absurd physical challenges, such as playing tug of war with a bull or racing a subway car. The first season of the show stars Yoo Jae-suk, Jung Hyung-don and Noh Hong-chul as regular cast members, with other cast members appearing occasionally. Guest stars include actor Cha Seung-won and tennis player Maria Sharapova.

=== Season 2 ===
Season 2 began airing on October 29, 2005, and is split into two parts named Excessive Challenge (무리한 도전) and Infinite Challenge – Master of Quiz (무한도전 퀴즈의달인). Excessive Challenge has a similar format to Season 1, while Infinite Challenge – Master of Quiz follows a quiz show format. Park Myung-soo, Jeong Jun-ha, and Haha join Season 1 regulars Yoo Jae-suk, Jung Hyung-don and Noh Hong-chul as cast members in Season 2. Singer Lee Hyori appears as a guest star in this season after a slew of episodes without guests.

=== Season 3 ===
The third season of the show, known simply as Infinite Challenge, began airing on May 6, 2006. Special coverage of 2006 World Cup Germany was featured for the entire month of June 2006, along with some 'Ah-ha' specials (with Shinhwa, for example) at the beginning of each episode. However, on July 8, 2006, the program took its memorable first step as the first 'Real-Variety' television program in Korean television history, with the airing of a segment called 'Please, come early': The six members were asked to come to the recording session on time or experience some form of punishment (일찍 와주길 바래, a part of the 'Please, be...' series see below), combining elements of both Reality TV and Variety programming, including comic characters from each of the Infinite Challenge members, see 'hosts'). Thereafter, the program has created challenges with regard to anything related to real life (excluding some critical issues such as religions and sexual preferences), in outdoor studios, with little use of acting or heavily based plotting. Since December 2, 2006, the program has received the highest ratings of prime-time lineups for Saturday evening.

In January 2012, the program took a 6-month hiatus due to a labor strike conducted by MBC's reporters and producers. During this period, new episodes were not produced and MBC, instead, aired reruns of previous episodes. In November 2015, Infinite Challenge arranged special exhibition and expo titled "Infinite Challenge Expo", in KINTEX. The program took a 7-week hiatus from broadcast in early 2017, which Kim Tae-ho, the main PD, signified as a period to normalize the production process which has been shortened considerably where the production team had less time and always rushed to meet the deadline. The PD also reveals that the program still continues their regular shooting schedules while being off the air.

The program took another 10-week hiatus from September 9, 2017, due to a labor strike by MBC's reporters and producers. During the strike, new episodes were not aired and reruns of previous episodes were broadcast. The strike ended on November 13, and Infinite Challenge returned to regular broadcasting on November 25. In March 2018, the program came to an end marked by the departure of Kim Tae-ho, the lead producer, which was followed by the members. However, after the last episode was aired, the program returned for 3 more weeks where it aired recap specials that pays tribute to the achievements of the program called "13 Years of Saturdays".

=== Recurring segments ===
These segments were featured in multiple episodes over the years due to their popularity.

- "Infinite News" – a parody on news broadcast in which most of the reported stories happened to some or all of the cast members. Those stories revolve around their personal life and tend to balance between facts and the comedic side of them.
- "Infinite Company" – an unscripted skit that parodied on the lives of office employees, similar to The Office. Initially, the skit was a reproduction of the late comedian Kim Hyung-gon work, called President, President, Our President, portraying a situational comedy around a board of directors of a company before it was changed to be about a group of employees in a small department.
- "Ha & Su" – an unscripted situational comedy around the petty quarrels between Jeong Jun-ha and Park Myeong-su, where the latter is aggressive and hot-tempered while the former is timid and simple-minded. In 2011, they were awarded a "Best Couple" award for their dynamic.
- "Jimotmi" – it stands for 지켜주지 못해서 미안해 (jikyeojuji motaeseo mianhae), which means "Sorry I could not look out for you" In this segment, the members play hidden-camera pranks on each other to see how they react to certain contrived situations.
- "Introducing My Ugly Friends Festival" – A segment where the members invited their acquaintances which they considered visually unappealing. Afterwards, the members organize a party where they celebrate with various games.
- "Saturday, Saturday's, I Am A Singer" – Suggested by Park Myeoung-Su and Jeong Jun-ha where the program arranges a stage where old artists were given chances to return and perform their hit songs. Sechs Kies and H.O.T. were able to reunite and came out of retirement through this segment.
- "Please, be..." – a segment which was introduced to instill common principles to all of the members. '"Please, come early"' forces the members to be punctual during filming day as the staff will not inform them when they would film the segment. '"Please, be friendly"', featuring Haha and Jeong Hyeong-don, were created to encourage both members to be more comfortable around each other.
- "Ah-Ha" – a Korean word game in which one member says a word, and the next person must then say that word backwards. Members who failed or made mistakes would be hit over the head. This segment premiered in the 2nd season (Infinite Challenge – The Master of Quiz) and was played occasionally in following seasons.
- "One-flash Telepathy" – after hearing a word which was given from the production booth, each member presented a gesture that would best represent that word. A round is cleared if all six members perform the same gesture and punishments were given when they failed. The original alleged purpose of this segment was to unite the minds of the members; however, they have yet to succeed. Voice narration for this segment was provided by Na Gyeong-eun, an announcer and Yoo Jae-suk's wife.
- Television Advertisements – throughout the episodes, the hosts create some satirical Korean television advertisements.
- Calendar-making Project – the members created a series of unique calendars and donated all profits from these sales to charity. This project has succeeded every season.

=== Special segments ===
Some of the segments of Infinite Challenge also developed into national events with audience participation.

- 2008 Host-in-Chief Elections – after a humorous request by Park Myeong-su to have a new leader in 2008, all Infinite Challenge members and staff held a vote for a new 'host-in-chief' on December 31, 2007, at the nation's own natural gas field near Ulsan. Prior to the election, each member created campaign pledges to encourage voters to vote for them. All entertainment managers, coordinators, MBC staff and the members voted at the South gate of the MBC Headquarters and the votes were counted on the morning of New Year's Day. Afterwards, Park Myeong-su was declared the new host-in-chief, but evidence showed him of tampering the voting box. The new host-in-chief was given 3 weeks to prove his leadership skills. However, after poor performances for 3 whole weeks, Park Myeong-su announced at an Infinite Challenge press conference that he would step down and wait for the new election to take place. In the aftermath, Yoo Jae-suk was appointed as interim host-in-chief on February 2, 2008. The second host-in-chief election was held on February 4, 2008, at the MBC Dream Center in Ilsan and Yoo Jae-suk won the majority of the votes and was once again reinstated as the host-in-chief.
- WM7 – the "Wrestling Muhan 7" project is an attempt by the members to perform at a professional wrestling event. From July 2009, the members started training by inviting Sonstar, junior-professional wrestler and the drummer of Cherry Filter, as their coach and Park Myeong-su as their club leader. After numerous injuries, including a concussion suffered by Jeong Hyeong-don, setbacks and delays, the members finally put on a performance in front of a live audience on August 19, 2010, at Jangchung Gymnasium. It was broadcast over 11 episodes and MBC also released a DVD edition of this challenge, featuring several unaired segments, stories and the full uncut performance.
- Decision 2014 – the show held another host-in-chief election in 2014 where the show elected a host-in-chief with 10 years tenure. These elections mirrored that of actual governmental elections, in an endeavor to promote voter turnout in South Korea's 2014 local elections. Similarly, the members created campaign pledges to attract viewers to vote for them in the preliminary internet polls before the airing of Decision 2014's first episode. The second internet poll was held after the episode aired. After the results of the second poll, Haha and Jeong Jun-ha decided to form a coalition under Jeong Hyeong-don while Park Myeong-su conceded, endorsing Yoo Jae-suk. About 50,000 people, including the members of Infinite Challenge, cast their votes on May 22, 2014, at polling stations in ten major cities (Seoul, Incheon, Daejeon, Daegu, Ulsan, Gwangju, Busan, Jeju, Chuncheon, and Jeonju). Another 34,000 people cast their votes earlier during the preliminary voting round from May 17–18, 2014. During the day of the election, audiences who could not make it to the polling stations were able to vote through a website, resulting in a turnout of 363,047 people online Combining the live polls and the internet votes, Yoo Jae-suk won the election by defeating Noh Hong-chul with 45,310 marginal votes or 8.29% of the combined votes.
- Infinite Challenge Song Festival – beginning in 2007, the members collaborated with musicians to compete in a music festival every two years.

== Hosts ==
=== Former ===
Name	Joined	Nickname	Character Description and Notes
Yoo Jae-suk (유재석, Host-in-chief)	April 2005 – March 2018	Captain Yoo (유반장); The First-in-command (1인자); Nation's MC (국민 MC); The grasshopper (메뚜기); Playboy Yoo/Nal Yoo (날유); The Sun (해님); God Yoo(유느님); Mr. My-Nipples-Below (저쪼아래)	
Park Myung-soo (박명수)	May - July 2005; October 2005 – March 2018	Giant Star/Geo-seong (거성); Father (아버지); The Second-in-command (2인자); The Son of the Devil (악마의 아들); NYSD(뉴욕쇠독); Rash Man(깨방정); Sancho Park (산초박); Alien (외계인); The leafhopper/Rice insect (벼멸구); Worthless older brother (하찮은 형); Unique Myeong-su (고유명수) (A play on 고유명사/"Proper noun"); CEO Park/Park sajang (박사장); Point five (쩜오); Great Park (그레이트 박); Flag Park(박깃발); The odd one out (쭈구리); Peter(피터); Reversal Park (박번복); Ten Jobs (십잡스); Mr. Tricky Park; Winner Park (박대상); One head, Two smell (한 머리 두 냄새); Waiter Park (웨이터 박); Senior Park (박선배); Boy Park (소년명수); Laughter Hunter (웃음 사냥꾼); Three Meals Myeong-su (명수세끼); DJ Park(DJ 박); Laughter dead (웃음 사망꾼)	Park has continuously proclaimed his nickname (Geo-seong, or Giant Star). He is often referred to as "Father" by the rest of the members due to his elderly look and his position as the oldest member of the program. This is especially prevalent when Myeong-su's receding hair is flattened or his make-up is removed. See his page for more details. His (on-air) persona is that of a veteran grumpy "upperclassman" of the other members. He often shouts or reprimands his "underclassmen," usually about humorously trivial matters. Thanks to his current work as the co-host of Infinite Challenge, Park Myeong-su gained more than 250 nicknames throughout his appearances on the program as listed by the netizens.
Jeong Jun-ha (정준하)	March 2006 – March 2018	The Helmet (헬멧), The Lord of Eating (식신); Monster (괴물); The Third-in-command (3인자); Stupid brother (바보형); Mr. Jeong Joong-ang (정중앙씨); Fat-fatso (뚱뚱보); Jjeori Jjang (쩌리짱); Global Moron; Cool Guy(쿨가이); Manager Jeong (정총무); Jeong Jun-yeon-a(정준연아) (Kim Yuna Parody); Somewhat lacking but a good friend (약간 모자라지만 착한 친구); Jonathan(조나단); The Lovester(사랑 전도사, 사랑꾼); Wax drippings Jeong (정촛농); Grandfather (할아버지); Icon of Aging (노화의 아이콘); Variety Show Zombie; Jung Jun Grandfather (정준 할아버지); The man that shook the world through dieting Funeral Photo Jun Ha (영정 준하); The Creation Myth of The Dieting World (다이어트계의 신화창조); Ndotto's Father (도토 아빠); MC Minzy (MC 민지)	His character is mainly defined by 3 things: his size (often referred to as being 0.1 tons, or 100 kilograms), appetite, and a degree of slowness in judgment. His extraordinarily large head (supposedly 8 kg) has gotten him, on a few occasions, called "Chivas Degal" (Degal = is a shortened word for "Degari", a vernacular word for "head"). In the 50th episode special of season 3, he was challenged to eat 50 plates of noodles in five minutes. The plates altogether weighed about 10–30 kg. (He succeeded, but had to go straight to the lavatory and subsequently slept in the back of the studio). On episode 61 of season 3, he went to a hair salon with Hong-chul to curl Hong-chul's hair. He asked a woman who was working there if she knew Jun-ha's name, but she said Joong-ang by mistake. Since that time, the members, including the creator Yoo Jae-suk, have frequently teased him as Mr. Jeong Joong-ang (정중앙씨), which means 'Mr. Square-in-the-middle'.
Haha (하하) (Ha Dong-hoon, 하동훈)	December 2005 – March 2008; March 2010 – March 2018	Shorty (단신); Childhood friend(with Noh Hong-chul) (죽마고우); Little one (꼬마); The M.A. Ha (석사 하하); The Top Little one(상꼬맹이); The Friend Who Lacking If Compared With the One At the Same Age (또래에 비해 떨어지는 친구); Hybrid Sammy Sosa Rio Levy (하이브리드 샘이솟아 리오레이비)	Haha is long considered the cutest and best-looking member of the cast. He is also the most-educated member, having obtained a Master of Arts in Theatre & Film at Daejin University; however, during the episode of the 50th special, he only got 20 points on a 100-point elementary-level spelling test. In episode 62 of season 3, he sang a song called 'A Little Boy's Story' (키작은 꼬마 이야기) as a tribute to his short height, which is a constant target of ridicule among the cast. It was a huge sensation with viewers. Haha temporarily left the show from March 2008 through March 2010 in order to fulfill his mandatory military service. In his final episode before entering the service, Haha performed at a guerrilla concert that was secretly organized by his fellow co-hosts.
Hwang Kwanghee (황광희)	April 2015 – March 2017	Kwanghee	Hwang Kwanghee was the youngest member among the cast of Infinite Challenge while he was on the show. A member of ZE:A idol group, Hwang Kwanghee joined the Infinite Challenge cast in April 2015. He was selected through the Sixth Man project which was held in order to fill the empty position after Noh Hong-chul left the program following a drunk driving incident. Kwanghee left the program in March 2017 in order to fulfill his military duty.
Jun Jin (전진) (Park Chung-Jae, 박충재)	July 2008 – November 2009	Junstin Jinberlake (전스틴); The roll-in kid (굴러들어온 놈); Jan Jin (잔진); The Million Dollar Boy (백만돌이)	In June 2008, Shinhwa member Jun Jin appeared on the show to replace Haha. Jin showed his extraordinary physical talent and was a target for all the other members of Infinite Challenge, who envied his looks and abilities during many challenges.
Gil (길) (Gil Seong-joon, 길성준)	April 2009 – April 2014	Baldy/Ppaakppaaki (빡빡이); Come between-Gil(이간길); Honey jar(꿀단지); Fat-fat-fatso (뚱뚱뚱보); Ip-sae (입새) (as he only brushes his teeth once a day); Gilmeo (길메오) (as a 'cameo' proclaimed by Yoo Jae-suk); Overreacting (무리수); The friend who born unfunny (태생적으로 재미없는 친구); Icon of Betrayal (배신의 아이콘)	Gil made his first appearance on an episode which featured Korean figure skater Kim Yuna in April 2009, ostensibly substituting for Jeong Jun-ha, who had to leave the episode recording early. He remained a de facto member of Infinite Challenge until he became a full member later that year. During the Boxing episodes in January 2010, Gil showed off his 9-year-long training in the sport. Gil is often called the Unfunny Friend due to his inability to ad-lib as quickly as the other co-hosts. On April 23, 2014, Gil was caught by the police due to drunk-driving. Fans of the variety show have been flooding the board with requests for Gil to leave the show for his inappropriate actions. Eventually, the MBC executives announced his leave on the same day.
Noh Hong-chul (노홍철)	April 2005 – November 2014	Stone Kid/Psychopath/Crazykid/Dol+I ('돌+아이'), Childhood friend(with Haha) (죽마고우); Quickmouth (퀵마우스); Noh Jji-rong (노찌롱); Global Fraudster(글로벌 사기꾼); Noh big-jaw(노하관); Fraudster (사기꾼); Affirmation Noh (노긍정); Anal Fistula Patient(치루치루); Dekopon (한라봉); Ppakku (빡구)	'돌+아이/Dol+I' was created by Yoo Jae-suk during episode 22 of season 3. Quickmouth was his original character, due to his ability to speak very rapidly. 돌+아이 (when written without the plus sign) is a Korean curse word meaning psychopath, or an extremely crazy person. Since this is a show watched by families, the staff humorously put a plus (+) sign in the middle to separate the word so its literal meaning becomes 'Stone+Kid' when in actuality it means 'psycho'. On-screen graphics often depict this nickname by displaying a large capital 'I' that looks to be made of stone ('아이' is pronounced like the letter 'I'). Similarly to former member Gil, Noh Hong-chul was caught driving under influence of alcohol on November 7, 2014. Following the incident, Noh Hong-chul released an official apology to the public through MBC. On the afternoon of November 8, MBC announced that Noh Hong-chul would be leaving the show and Infinite Challenge would continue on with the five remaining cast members.
Jeong Hyeong-don (정형돈)	April 2005 – November 2015	Fatso (뚱보); Awkward fatso (어색한 뚱보); Jinsang (진상, nuisance); Jeong Hang-don (정항돈); The Moon (달님); Doni (도니); Crazy Existence (미친존재감); Gaehwadong Orange-Tribe (개화동 오렌지족); Top Four MC (4대천왕)	A comedian by profession before joining the team, Jeong Hyeong-don used to appear in the Korean comedy show Gag Concert (where Do-Re-Mi Trio being one of his many skits). However, over many episodes, he has demonstrated remarkable talent in everything imaginable (for example, catching grapes with his mouth or playing a Korean jump-rope game) except being funny. He is teased by the other members for this. His character is also defined by the ability to make anyone around him feel awkward (as seen in the earlier episode) In November 2015, Jung Hyeong-don had suspended all broadcasting activities for health reasons. On July 29, 2016, Jeong Hyeong-don's label, FNC Entertainment, officially announced that Jeong Hyeong-don would permanently leave the show after a nine-month hiatus from the broadcast due to poor health condition.
Yang Se-hyung (양세형)	March 2017 – March 2018		
Jo Se-ho (조세호)	January - March 2018		
PSY (싸이	January - March 2018		

=== Occasional appearances ===
- There are a number of people who both individually work for this program and irregularly appear with Infinite Challenge members (hosts). They are frequently referred to as 'the 8th member' (제8의 멤버).

Name	Nickname	Occupation	Character Description and Notes
Defconn (데프콘)	Daepho-phone(대포폰); Peh-conn-ie(프콘이)	Singer; Long-time buddy of Jeong Hyeong-don	Since MuDo's 'Rowing challenge' during the Spring-Summer season of 2011, he is the frequent pinch-hitter of this programme, while one or more cast members in absence. Together with Jung Hyung-don, he formed a hip-hop duo "Hyeongdon and Daejoon" (형돈이와 대준이). Defconn was the cast member of KBS2 Sunday variety show, 2 Days & 1 Night Season 3.
Jeong Seok-kwon (정석권)	Manager Jeong (Jeong Sil-jang 정실장) Narrow-mouth Frog Brother (Mangkongei Hyong 맹꽁이형)	Long-time buddy & Entertainment Manager of Park Myeong-su	While serving as a manager, Jeong Sil-jang had aspirations to be a comedian in his own right. Whenever he was given a chance to appear on-screen, he was often ridiculed by other cast members for attempting to constantly outperform others and for overacting in order to gain attention. As such, many of his parts were usually edited out of the final broadcast. To restrain his growing popularity, Park Myeong-su often teasingly ordered that his manager not appear on the show again.
Choi Jong-hun (최종훈)	Choi Co-ordi. (최코디); Almighty Co-ord. Choi (Man-neung Choi-codi /만능 최코디)	Entertainment Manager of Jeong Jun-ha	As Jeong Jun-ha's coordinator, Choi also hoped to become a rising star as a professional actor his common hope of rising stardom (as a professional actor), with a lot of help from Jeong Jun-ha himself. He prepared a bunch of radishes for the members on 'Kimchi Preparation' (S03E30) and 'Jun(Semi-) Hines Ward'(S03E77) episodes well, and he presented his professional agricultural skills on the episodes 'MD Goes to country' (S03E25) and 'Rice-planting' (S03E56).
Kim Oak-jeong (김옥정)	Mrs. Kim (김옥정 여사); Oak-jeong Kim (옥정 킴); Jung d'Oak-jeong (융드옥정, named after her favourite outfit, the Jung Dress)	Mother of Haha	As has been regularly reported by the hosts, Kim has minimal cooking skills and is often humorously featured on the show to feed the cast members. She appeared for the first time in episode 83 of the third season; her closing comment of 'Hit that jackpot!' (Dae-bak Teo-ji-se-yo! 대박 터지세요) became an enormously popular new-year greeting.
Kim Tae-ho (김태호)	Bro. TEO (태호 형); TEO PD (태호 PD)	Executive Producer of Infinite Challenge	A pioneer of Korean entertainment, Kim Tae-ho produces and directs the show. Besides helping to create the unique Real-Variety format, Kim also innovated Korean television by adding unique captions to the show. Although captions are commonplace on Korean variety shows, Kim's captions went beyond simple descriptions or commentary, adding information on cast members' emotions and expressing reactions to the show, giving the captions an interactive feel that aligned with the viewing audience's thoughts. With high sensitivity for fashion, he gained extraordinary popularity when he officially opened his 'Cyworld' webpage. Although his presence is mostly felt through his captioning and occasional off-screen soundbites, he appeared as a witness of the Moot court challenge, which aired on February 20, 2010.
Kim Tae-hee (김태희)	Writer Kim (김태희 작가)	Writer of Infinite Challenge	As a high-profiled co-writer of Infinite Challenge and a Korean actress-namesake, she enjoys her huge popularity from dedicated viewers. During the 'Making a song for X-mas challenge'(S03E33) episode, she became very popular when Noh Hong-chul said that she 'has the posterior of (actress) Kim Tae-hee, but the front of Infinite Challenge.'
Shin Mi-so (신미소)	Miso Co-ordi. (미소코디)	Fashion Co-ordinator of Yoo Jae-suk	A Busan-native who helped assemble Yoo Jae-suk's wardrobe, Shin was also a popular 'guest' on the show. She debuted during a '100-minute Debate' (episode 42 of season 3), in which she was caught falling asleep in the audience. This incident made her name the top online keyword of March 2007. She was also featured when she accidentally broke a set of illuminators when Lee Young-ae appeared on Infinite Challenge (episode 52 of season 3). She eventually appeared as a co-host of 'Madness Couples' (episode 75 of season 3) with the Host-in-chief Yoo Jae-suk. She was known to be able to argue with all six members of the show, earning her the nickname 'Aegis ship.'

== Awards and nominations ==
Year	Award	Category	Recipients	Result	Ref.
2006	6th MBC Entertainment Awards	Grand Prize	Yoo Jae-suk	Won	
2006	6th MBC Entertainment Awards	Best Program – Viewers' Choice	Infinite Challenge	Won	
2006	6th MBC Entertainment Awards	Top Excellence Award in a Variety Show	Park Myung-soo	Won	
2006	6th MBC Entertainment Awards	Excellence Award in a Variety Show	Haha	Won	
2006	6th MBC Entertainment Awards	Best Writer	Moon Eun-ae	Won	
2007	MBC Program Production Awards	Best Program Award	Infinite Challenge	Won	
2007	MBC Program Production Awards	Best Program Award – Variety Category	Infinite Challenge	Won	
2007	MBC Program Production Awards	Achievement Award	Kim Tae-ho	Won	
2007	7th MBC Entertainment Awards	Grand Prize	Infinite Challenge (Yoo Jae-suk, Park Myung-soo, Jeong Jun-ha, Jung Hyung-don, Haha and Noh Hong-chul)	Won	
2007	7th MBC Entertainment Awards	Best Program – Viewers' Choice	Infinite Challenge	Won	
2007	7th MBC Entertainment Awards	Friendship Award	Park Myung-soo	Won	
2007	7th MBC Entertainment Awards	Best Writer	Ju Gi-ppeum	Won	
2008	44th Baeksang Arts Awards	Best Entertainment Program	Infinite Challenge	Won	
2008	44th Baeksang Arts Awards	Best Male Variety Performer	Yoo Jae-suk	Nominated	
2008	89th Korean National Sports Festival	Aerobics Competition – 6-Member General Division	Infinite Challenge (Yoo Jae-suk, Park Myung-soo, Jeong Jun-ha, Jung Hyung-don, Noh Hong-chu and Jun Jin)	2nd Place	
2008	20th Korean Producer Awards	Best Television Variety Program	Infinite Challenge	Won	
2008	8th MBC Entertainment Awards	Excellence Award in a Variety Show	Jung Hyung-don	Won	
2008	8th MBC Entertainment Awards	Best Program – Producers' Choice	Infinite Challenge	Won	
2008	8th MBC Entertainment Awards	Best Entertainer (Special Award)	Jun Jin	Won	
2009	36th Korean Broadcasting Awards	Best Television Director	Kim Tae-ho	Won	
2009	36th Korean Broadcasting Awards	Best Television Variety Program	Infinite Challenge	Won	
2009	9th MBC Entertainment Awards	Grand Prize	Yoo Jae-suk	Won	
2009	9th MBC Entertainment Awards	Excellence Award in a Variety Show	Noh Hong-chul	Won	
2009	9th MBC Entertainment Awards	Best New Entertainer in a Variety Show	Gill	Won	
2009	9th MBC Entertainment Awards	Producers' Award	Infinite Challenge	Won	
2009	9th MBC Entertainment Awards	Best Program – Viewers' Choice	Infinite Challenge	Won	
2009	Melon Music Awards	Best Special Album	Infinite Challenge Olympic Highway Duet Song Festival	Won	
2010	10th MBC Entertainment Awards	Grand Prize	Yoo Jae-suk	Won	
2010	10th MBC Entertainment Awards	Top Excellence Award in a Variety Show	Park Myung-soo	Won	
2010	11th Korean National Assembly Awards	Best Television Program of the Year	Infinite Challenge	Won	
2010	22nd Korean Producer Awards	Best Television Variety Program	Infinite Challenge	Won	
2011	11th MBC Entertainment Awards	Top Excellence Award in a Variety Show	Yoo Jae-suk	Won	
2011	11th MBC Entertainment Awards	Best Couple Award	Park Myung-soo and Jeong Jun-ha	Won (Note: The first male-male couple to have ever won the title.)	
2011	11th MBC Entertainment Awards	Popularity Award	Jung Jae-hyung	Won	
2011	53rd Annual National Rowing Championships	2000m Novice Inn (Special Award)	Infinite Challenge	Won	
2011	Melon Music Awards	Hot Trend Award	West Coast Highway Song Festival	Won	
2012	12th MBC Entertainment Awards	Grand Prize	Park Myung-soo	Won	
2012	12th MBC Entertainment Awards	Producers' Award	Yoo Jae-suk	Won	
2012	12th MBC Entertainment Awards	Best Couple Award	Kim C and Jo Jung-chi	Won	
2013	13th MBC Entertainment Awards	Best Program – Viewers' Choice	Infinite Challenge	Won	
2013	13th MBC Entertainment Awards	Popularity Award	Noh Hong-chul	Won	
2013	13th MBC Entertainment Awards	Best Couple Award	Jung Hyung-don and G-Dragon	Won	
2013	13th MBC Entertainment Awards	Top Excellence Award in a Variety Show	Jung Hyung-don	Won	
2013	49th Baeksang Arts Awards	Grand Prize for Television	Yoo Jae-suk	Won	
2014	14th MBC Entertainment Awards	Grand Prize	Yoo Jae-suk	Won	
2014	14th MBC Entertainment Awards	Best Program – Viewers' Choice	Infinite Challenge	Won	
2014	14th MBC Entertainment Awards	Producers' Award	Haha	Won	
2014	14th MBC Entertainment Awards	Top Excellence Award in a Variety Show	Jeong Jun-ha	Won	
2014	MBC PD's Association	Producer of the Year	Kim Tae-ho	Won	
2015	42nd Korea Broadcasting Awards	Grand Prize	Infinite Challenge	Won (Note: The first variety show to win the award after 16 years.)	
2015	Amnesty International Korean Media Awards 2015	Media Award of the Year	Infinite Challenge	Won	
2015	15th MBC Entertainment Awards	Best Writer Award	Lee Eun-ju	Won	
2015	15th MBC Entertainment Awards	Special Contribution Award	Infinite Challenge	Won	
2015	15th MBC Entertainment Awards	Top Male Excellence for Variety Show	Haha	Won	
2015	15th MBC Entertainment Awards	People's Choice - Best Entertainment Program	Infinite Challenge	Won	
2015	15th MBC Entertainment Awards	Achievement Award	Infinite Challenge (Park Myung-su, Jeong Jun-ha, Yoo Jae-suk, Haha, Hwang Kwanghee)	Won	
2015	51st Baeksang Arts Awards	Best Male Variety Performer	Jung Hyung-don	Nominated	
2016	52nd Baeksang Arts Awards	Best Male Variety Performer	Jeong Jun-ha	Nominated	
2016	16th MBC Entertainment Awards	Grand Prize	Yoo Jae-suk	Won	
2016	16th MBC Entertainment Awards	Grand Prize	Jeong Jun-ha	Nominated	
2016	16th MBC Entertainment Awards	Top Excellence Award in a Variety Show	Jeong Jun-ha	Won	
2016	16th MBC Entertainment Awards	Top Excellence Award in a Variety Show	Yoo Jae-suk	Nominated	
2016	16th MBC Entertainment Awards	Excellence Award in Variety Show	Hwang Kwanghee	Nominated	
2016	16th MBC Entertainment Awards	Program of the Year	Infinite Challenge	Won	
2016	16th MBC Entertainment Awards	Popularity Award	Yang Se-hyung	Won	
2017	17th MBC Entertainment Awards	Grand Prize	Yoo Jae-suk	Nominated	
2017	17th MBC Entertainment Awards	Grand Prize	Park Myeong-su	Nominated	
2017	17th MBC Entertainment Awards	Program of the Year	Infinite Challenge	Nominated	
2017	17th MBC Entertainment Awards	Top Excellence Award in a Variety Show	Yoo Jae-suk	Nominated	
2017	17th MBC Entertainment Awards	Top Excellence Award in a Variety Show	Park Myeong-su	Won	
2017	17th MBC Entertainment Awards	Excellence Award in a Variety Show	Yang Se-hyung	Won	

== Guests ==
=== International ===
Name	Appeared	Occupation	Notes
Esper Itō (エスパー伊東)	Season 1, Episode 22	Japanese comedian	Appeared one episode (Season 1)
Maria Sharapova	Season 1, Episode 23 and 24	Russian tennis player	Appeared two episodes (Season 1)
Michelle Wie	Season 4, Episode 1 and 2	American golfer	Appeared two episodes (Season 4)
Fedor Emelianenko	Season 4 Episode 18 and 19	Russian PRIDE heavyweight champion	Appeared two episodes; he taught each member submission holds - Season 4
Thierry Henry	Season 4, Episode 57 and 58	French football player	Appeared two episodes (Season 4)
Paris Hilton	Season 4, Episode 81	American socialite	Appeared one episode (Season 4)
Tenku Tsubasa (前田睦美)	Season 4, Episode 189 and 190	Japanese boxer	Appeared two episodes (Season 4)
MC Hammer	Season 4, Episode 312	American singer, rapper	Appeared one episode (Season 4), while featuring PSY for Dick Clark's New Year's Rockin' Eve with Ryan Seacrest 2013
Ryan Seacrest	Season 4, Episode 312	American TV show presenter, broadcaster	Appeared one episode (Season 4), while preparing Dick Clark's New Year's Rockin' Eve with Ryan Seacrest 2013, with PSY, Yoo Jae-suk, Noh Hong-chul, and Haha
Daisy Donovan	Season 4, Episode 326	British TV show presenter, broadcaster	Appeared one episode (Season 4), to introduce this programme as one of South Korea's 'traditional television show', to the viewers in the United Kingdom. Her report was eventually shown on Channel 4 television show called "The Greatest Shows on Earth", on July 8, 2013.
Usain Bolt	Season 4, Episode 371	Jamaican sprinter	Appeared one episode (Season 4), among Jamaica special episodes (369-371).
Ali Bongo Ondimba	Season 4, Episode 445	President of Gabon	After meeting and delivering food to the president's long-time chief security officer, Park Sang-chul, Jeong Jun-ha did an interview with the President.
Jack Black	Season 4, Episode 465 and 542	American actor, musician	Appeared two episodes (Season 4)
Stephen Curry	Season 4, Episode 541	American basketball players	Appeared one episode (Season 4)
Seth Curry	Season 4, Episode 541	American basketball players	Appeared one episode (Season 4)
Manny Pacquiao	Season 4, Episode 551 and Episode 552	Filipino boxer, senator	Appeared two episodes (Season 4)

=== Korean ===
Numerous Korean celebrities have appeared on the show due to its popularity. Many of the guests have some relationships with the co-hosts of the show, including:

Korean guests

Actors

- Cha Seung-won
- Cha Tae-hyun
- Gong Hyung-jin
- Bong Tae-gyu
- Choi Ji-woo
- Jo In-sung
- Lee Na-young
- Song Joong-ki
- Jin Goo
- Jang Keun-suk
- Joo Sang-wook
- Kim Min-kyo
- Kim Seul-gi
- Go Kyung-pyo
- Kim Sun-ah
- Yoon Son-ha
- Kim Min-jun
- Kim Soo-ro
- Kim Tae-hee
- Kim Soo-hyun
- Ko Chang-seok
- Lee Young-ae
- Kim Hye-sung
- Jung Il-woo
- Han Hye-jin
- Lee Yo-won
- Han Ji-min
- Lee Seo-jin
- Han Sang-jin
- Lee Jong-soo
- Jeon Won-joo
- Jung Si-ah
- Yoon Sang-hyun
- Choi Cheol-ho
- Oh Ji-ho
- Kwon Oh-joong
- Jung Joon-ho
- Jang Seo-hee
- Kim Bum
- Julien Kang
- Lee Tae-sung
- Kim Ji-hoon
- Park Bo-young
- Park Shin-hye
- Park Bo-gum
- So Ji-sub
- Shin Se-kyung
- Lee Dong-wook
- Kim Hee-ae
- Son Ye-jin
- Kim Hye-soo
- Lee Je-hoon
- Jung Woo-sung
- Hwang Jung-min
- Joo Ji-hoon
- Choi Min-yong
- Bae Jung-nam

Comedians, Entertainers

- Ji Sang-ryeol
- Lee Yoon-suk
- Kim Hyun-chul
- Kim Je-dong
- Shin Bong-sun
- Song Eun-i
- Kim Shin-young
- Baek Bo-ram
- Kim Kyung-jin
- Park Hwi-soon
- Ahn Young-mi
- Byun Ki-soo
- Kim Mi-hwa
- Kim Young-chul
- Lee Guk-joo
- Kim Jong-min
- Moon Se-yoon
- Yoo Byung-jae

Musicians

- Lee Jung
- Cool
  - Kim Seong-su
  - Yoo Chae-young
- Bae Seul-ki
- Hyukoh
- Girls' Generation
  - Jessica
  - Sunny
  - Seohyun
- Turbo
  - Kim Jong-kook
  - Kim Jung-nam
- Lee Hyo-ri
- Brown Eyed Girls
  - Narsha
- Lee Seung-chul
- Joo Young-hoon
- Lee Soo-young
- B1A4
  - Baro
- Shinhwa
- SS501
- Tony An
- Sung Si-kyung
- Jewelry
- Park Jung-ah
- Seo In-young
- Hwangbo
- MC Mong
- Lee Min-woo
- Bbaek Ga
- Wheesung
- Uhm Jung-hwa
- Son Dam-bi
- After School
  - Lizzy
- Lee Jung-hyun
- Tiger JK / Yoon Mi-rae
- No Brain
- YB
- Lee Sung-jin
- Son Ho-young
- 2PM
  - Junho
  - Jaebeom
- Kara
  - Seungyeon
  - Jiyoung
- S.E.S.
  - Bada
  - Shoo
- Epik High
- Eun Ji-won
- Park Hyun-bin
- K.Will
- MBLAQ
  - Lee Joon
- Sangchu
- One Two
- CNBLUE
- Sistar
- Secret
- 4minute
- Orange Caramel
- SHINee
- Kangta
- Super Junior
  - Donghae
  - Siwon
- f(x)
- IU
- GFriend
- Big Bang
- Jung Jae-hyung
- Lee Juck
- Sweet Sorrow
- 10cm
- Psy
- Leessang
  - Gary
- 2AM
  - Jinwoon
  - Jo Kwon
- Park Bom
- Defconn
- All Lies Band
- Go Young-wook
- BoA
- G-Dragon
- Kiha & the Faces
- Infinite
- Kim C
- ZE:A
  - Hyungsik
  - Siwan
- Kim Bum-soo
- John Park
- So Chan-whee
- Jo Sung-mo
- Kim Hyun-jung
- Kim Gun-mo
- Cool
- Jinusean
- Park Jin-young
- Zico
- Sechs Kies
- Dok2
- BewhY
- Gaeko
- EXO
- Winner
  - Mino
  - Jinwoo
- DinDin
- Lee Hi
- Mad Clown
- Kim Jong-wan
- Crush
- H.O.T

Sports/athletes

- Lee Yong-dae / Lee Hyo-jung
- Kim Yeon-ah, international figure skater
- South Korea women's national handball team
- Choi Hyun-mi, WBA Women's Featherweight Champion
- Son Yeon-jae, South Korean rhythmic gymnast
- Lee Sung-yong, Korean Professional Baseball Batter
- Lee Sang-hwa, South Korean long track speed skater

Others

- Ahn Hye-kyung, broadcaster
- Na Kyung-eun, broadcaster, Yoo Jae-Suk's wife
- Choi Moon-soon, then-CEO of MBC
- Ohm Ki-young, then-CEO of MBC
- Lee Sang-bong, fashion designer
- Park Kyung-chu, broadcaster
- Huh Young-man, famed comics artist and writer
- Hong Jin-kyung, model and a CEO of food venture company
- Lee Hye-jung, chef
- Yang Ji-hoon, chef
- Myung Hyun-ji, chef
- Kang Seung-hyun, model
- Choi Dan-bi, lawyer
- Jang Jin-young, lawyer
- Jang Yoon-joo, model (Moderator of 2011 Calendar-making project)
- Bae Hyun-jin, broadcaster

== Hallmark ==
=== Purported foreshadowing of actual events ===
Infinity Challenge is famous for predicting jokes before some events occurred in real life, like The Simpsons. Several episodes predicted the drama Squid Game. Another episode, "Manager Jeong", Haha bought a book called American Prometheus, and about 2 months later, he wrote a book review for the book, but the contents were messy, so he made the members laugh. In 2023, twelve years later, Christopher Nolan made the film Oppenheimer based on that book, Haha became the South Korean public relations ambassador for that movie. Other examples purported as Infinity Challenge predicting the future include the Brexit, Among Us, Hangout with Yoo, Koo Jun-yup and Barbie Hsu's marriage, and Kim Shin-young's Korea Sings MC selected.

The reason why this makes a lot of prophecy is that this program itself is a format in which different special features with different themes were planned every time, and even though it has been several years since the show ended, it enjoys greater popularity than active programs, and there are overflowing sources that are discovered.

== Ratings ==
List of 2007 ratings (episodes 35–85)

Episode	Original airdate	AGB Nielsen Nationwide ratings
35	January 6, 2007	16.0%
36	January 13, 2007	18.5%
37	January 20, 2007	18.5%
38	January 27, 2007	17.8%
39	February 3, 2007	17.5%
40	February 10, 2007	17.2%
41	February 17, 2007	15.6%
42	February 24, 2007	14.9%
43	March 3, 2007	17.7%
44	March 10, 2007	15.1%
45	March 17, 2007	15.2%
46	March 24, 2007	16.6%
47	March 31, 2007	14.2%
48	April 7, 2007	15.4%
49	April 14, 2007	14.7%
50	April 21, 2007	13.4%
51	April 28, 2007	13.0%
52	May 5, 2007	17.2%
53	May 12, 2007	16.0%
54	May 19, 2007	15.3%
55	May 26, 2007	13.1%
56	June 2, 2007	14.0%
57	June 9, 2007	16.1%
58	June 16, 2007	16.0%
59	June 23, 2007	18.6%
60	June 30, 2007	18.8%
61	July 7, 2007	15.8%
62	July 14, 2007	16.4%
63	July 21, 2007	17.7%
64	July 28, 2007	17.6%
65	August 4, 2007	15.6%
66	August 11, 2007	19.9%
67	August 18, 2007	24.1%
68	August 25, 2007	21.9%
69	September 1, 2007	20.0%
70	September 8, 2007	19.3%
71	September 15, 2007	20.7%
72	September 22, 2007	22.4%
73	September 29, 2007	23.5%
74	October 6, 2007	20.5%
75	October 13, 2007	20.4%
76	October 20, 2007	23.1%
77	October 27, 2007	19.5%
78	November 3, 2007	21.2%
79	November 10, 2007	21.9%
80	November 24, 2007	22.4%
81	December 1, 2007	17.6%
82	December 8, 2007	26.1%
83	December 15, 2007	21.3%
84	December 22, 2007	21.3%
85	December 29, 2007	22.3%

List of 2008 ratings (episodes 86–136)

Episode	Original airdate	AGB Nielsen Nationwide ratings
86	January 5, 2008	23.6%
87	January 12, 2008	25.8%
88	January 19, 2008	27.9%
89	January 26, 2008	25.0%
90	February 2, 2008	26.4%
91	February 9, 2008	28.9%
92	February 16, 2008	27.4%
93	February 23, 2008	22.0%
94	March 1, 2008	19.7%
95	March 8, 2008	21.6%
96	March 15, 2008	20.1%
97	March 22, 2008	20.9%
98	March 29, 2008	20.6%
99	April 5, 2008	17.2%
100	April 12, 2008	19.5%
101	April 19, 2008	17.9%
102	April 26, 2008	21.2%
103	May 3, 2008	17.1%
104	May 10, 2008	16.3%
105	May 17, 2008	15.4%
106	May 24, 2008	14.9%
107	May 31, 2008	13.9%
108	June 7, 2008	15.4%
109	June 14, 2008	15.4%
110	June 21, 2008	17.0%
111	June 28, 2008	16.9%
112	July 5, 2008	16.0%
113	July 12, 2008	16.8%
114	July 19, 2008	16.6%
115	July 26, 2008	16.7%
116	August 2, 2008	14.7%
117	August 16, 2008	13.6%
118	August 23, 2008	15.6%
119	August 30, 2008	14.9%
120	September 6, 2008	15.8%
121	September 13, 2008	15.4%
122	September 20, 2008	20.1%
123	September 27, 2008	14.6%
124	October 4, 2008	14.0%
125	October 11, 2008	17.7%
126	October 18, 2008	15.4%
127	October 25, 2008	17.0%
128	November 1, 2008	17.9%
129	November 8, 2008	15.8%
130	November 15, 2008	16.4%
131	November 22, 2008	17.2%
132	November 29, 2008	17.1%
133	December 6, 2008	14.8%
134	December 13, 2008	12.6%
135	December 20, 2008	15.4%
136	December 27, 2008	15.3%

List of 2009 ratings (episodes 137–185)

Episode	Original airdate	AGB Nielsen Nationwide ratings
137	January 17, 2009	12.4%
138	January 24, 2009	15.9%
139	January 31, 2009	15.2%
140	February 7, 2009	17.6%
141	February 14, 2009	14.4%
142	February 21, 2009	16.1%
143	February 28, 2009	16.4%
144	March 7, 2009	16.7%
145	March 14, 2009	13.6%
146	March 21, 2009	14.0%
147	March 28, 2009	14.9%
148	April 4, 2009	13.7%
149	April 11, 2009	14.2%
150	April 18, 2009	16.9%
151	April 25, 2009	19.7%
152	May 2, 2009	15.7%
153	May 9, 2009	12.8%
154	May 16, 2009	16.6%
155	May 30, 2009	13.2%
156	June 6, 2009	13.1%
157	June 13, 2009	12.9%
158	June 20, 2009	17.5%
159	June 27, 2009	14.1%
160	July 4, 2009	15.8%
161	July 11, 2009	17.9%
162	July 18, 2009	15.3%
163	July 25, 2009	14.7%
164	August 1, 2009	12.8%
165	August 8, 2009	16.8%
166	August 15, 2009	16.7%
167	August 22, 2009	15.3%
168	August 29, 2009	14.5%
169	September 5, 2009	16.2%
170	September 12, 2009	15.3%
171	September 19, 2009	15.7%
172	September 26, 2009	17.2%
173	October 3, 2009	14.1%
174	October 10, 2009	14.3%
175	October 17, 2009	14.4%
176	October 24, 2009	16.8%
177	October 31, 2009	18.1%
178	November 7, 2009	18.0%
179	November 14, 2009	18.6%
180	November 21, 2009	15.8%
181	November 28, 2009	17.1%
182	December 5, 2009	15.9%
183	December 12, 2009	15.3%
184	December 19, 2009	13.6%
185	December 26, 2009	13.4%

List of 2010 ratings (episodes 186–209)

Episode	Original airdate	AGB Nielsen Nationwide ratings
186	January 2, 2010	16.5%
187	January 9, 2010	19.5%
188	January 16, 2010	17.4%
189	January 23, 2010	17.1%
190	January 30, 2010	16.3%
191	February 6, 2010	15.2%
192	February 13, 2010	16.2%
193	February 20, 2010	17.5%
194	February 27, 2010	16.8%
195	March 6, 2010	19.3%
196	March 13, 2010	15.6%
197	March 20, 2010	19.0%
198	March 27, 2010	17.2%
199	May 22, 2010	17.2%
200	May 29, 2010	13.9%
201	June 5, 2010	15.6%
202	June 12, 2010	16.1%
203	June 19, 2010	16.0%
204	June 26, 2010	16.5%
205	July 3, 2010	14.4%
206	July 10, 2010	12.9%
207	July 17, 2010	16.8%
208	July 24, 2010	14.3%
209	July 31, 2010	13.6%
210	August 7, 2010	13.5%
211	August 14, 2010	15.7%
212	August 21, 2010	16.3%
213	August 28, 2010	13.5%
214	September 4, 2010	16.2%
215	September 11, 2010	17.5%
216	September 18, 2010	13.8%
217	September 25, 2010	15.8%
218	October 2, 2010	16.0%
219	October 9, 2010	14.0%
220	October 16, 2010	15.4%
221	October 23, 2010	16.3%
222	October 30, 2010	13.3%
223	November 6, 2010	14.4%
224	November 20, 2010	13.2%
225	November 27, 2010	15.0%
226	December 4, 2010	15.1%
227	December 11, 2010	14.5%
228	December 18, 2010	15.2%
229	December 25, 2010	13.5%

List of 2011 ratings (episodes 230–282)

Episode	Original airdate	AGB Nielsen Nationwide ratings
230	January 1, 2011	15.8%
231	January 8, 2011	17.8%
232	January 15, 2011	18.4%
233	January 22, 2011	18.9%
234	January 29, 2011	17.9%
235	February 5, 2011	19.4%
236	February 12, 2011	17.1%
237	February 19, 2011	17.3%
238	February 26, 2011	15.2%
239	March 5, 2011	16.6%
240	March 12, 2011	13.7%
241	March 19, 2011	14.8%
242	March 26, 2011	16.4%
243	April 2, 2011	14.8%
244	April 9, 2011	16.2%
245	April 16, 2011	13.4%
246	April 23, 2011	14.4%
247	April 30, 2011	18.7%
248	May 7, 2011	15.1%
249	May 14, 2011	14.4%
250	May 21, 2011	15.3%
251	May 28, 2011	13.3%
252	June 4, 2011	13.8%
253	June 11, 2011	15.4%
254	June 18, 2011	14.1%
255	June 25, 2011	17.4%
256	July 2, 2011	18.5%
257	July 9, 2011	17.5%
258	July 16, 2011	17.2%
259	July 23, 2011	14.4%
260	July 30, 2011	16.1%
261	August 6, 2011	18.0%
262	August 13, 2011	18.0%
263	August 20, 2011	17.1%
264	August 27, 2011	17.5%
265	September 3, 2011	16.8%
266	September 10, 2011	18.1%
267	September 17, 2011	18.0%
268	September 24, 2011	17.4%
269	October 1, 2011	16.4%
270	October 8, 2011	18.6%
271	October 15, 2011	19.2%
272	October 22, 2011	18.0%
273	October 29, 2011	17.4%
274	November 5, 2011	18.6%
275	November 12, 2011	17.1%
276	November 19, 2011	17.0%
277	November 26, 2011	17.0%
278	December 3, 2011	16.1%
279	December 10, 2011	15.6%
280	December 17, 2011	17.9%
281	December 24, 2011	17.5%
282	December 31, 2011	18.2%

List of 2012 ratings (episodes 283–310)

Episode	Original airdate	AGB Nielsen Nationwide ratings
283	January 7, 2012	20.6%
284	January 14, 2012	17.9%
285	January 21, 2012	17.3%
286	January 28, 2012	19.5%
287	Aired online	Unknown
288	July 28, 2012	10.5%
289	August 4, 2012	13.6%
290	August 11, 2012	12.4%
291	August 18, 2012	14.2%
292	August 25, 2012	14.4%
293	September 1, 2012	12.8%
294	September 8, 2012	14.4%
295	September 15, 2012	14.0%
296	September 22, 2012	14.6%
297	September 29, 2012	14.7%
298	October 6, 2012	15.1%
299	October 13, 2012	13.7%
300	October 20, 2012	15.1%
301	October 27, 2012	14.4%
302	November 3, 2012	13.2%
303	November 10, 2012	12.7%
304	November 17, 2012	16.3%
305	November 24, 2012	15.6%
306	December 1, 2012	15.8%
307	December 8, 2012	15.8%
308	December 15, 2012	14.5%
309	December 22, 2012	15.7%
310	December 29, 2012	14.5%

List of 2013 ratings (episodes 311–362)

Episode	Original airdate	AGB Nielsen Nationwide ratings
311	January 5, 2013	15.5%
312	January 12, 2013	17.3%
313	January 19, 2013	16.4%
314	January 26, 2013	14.7%
315	February 2, 2013	14.6%
316	February 9, 2013	12.8%
317	February 16, 2013	13.7%
318	February 23, 2013	10.9%
319	March 2, 2013	14.2%
320	March 9, 2013	14.9%
321	March 16, 2013	14.7%
322	March 23, 2013	14.4%
323	March 30, 2013	15.3%
324	April 6, 2013	15.0%
325	April 13, 2013	12.5%
326	April 20, 2013	14.1%
327	April 27, 2013	12.0%
328	May 4, 2013	10.6%
329	May 11, 2013	13.4%
330	May 18, 2013	14.3%
331	May 25, 2013	11.6%
332	June 1, 2013	11.4%
333	June 8, 2013	12.5%
334	June 15, 2013	13.5%
335	June 22, 2013	13.3%
336	June 29, 2013	11.9%
337	July 6, 2013	13.2%
338	July 13, 2013	11.9%
339	July 20, 2013	13.1%
340	July 27, 2013	11.3%
341	August 3, 2013	11.7%
342	August 10, 2013	12.2%
343	August 17, 2013	12.7%
344	August 24, 2013	11.7%
345	August 31, 2013	12.0%
346	September 7, 2013	13.7%
347	September 14, 2013	11.5%
348	September 21, 2013	12.3%
349	September 28, 2013	14.4%
350	October 5, 2013	12.3%
351	October 12, 2013	14.4%
352	October 19, 2013	16.1%
353	October 26, 2013	15.0%
354	November 2, 2013	16.8%
355	November 9, 2013	15.0%
356	November 16, 2013	13.5%
357	November 23, 2013	14.3%
358	November 30, 2013	13.7%
359	December 7, 2013	12.7%
360	December 14, 2013	14.7%
361	December 21, 2013	15.8%
362	December 28, 2013	15.6%

List of 2014 ratings (episodes 363–410)

Episode	Original airdate	AGB Nielsen Nationwide ratings
363	January 4, 2014	14.5%
364	January 11, 2014	15.7%
365	January 18, 2014	13.4%
366	January 25, 2014	13.2%
367	February 1, 2014	13.4%
368	February 8, 2014	12.8%
369	February 22, 2014	13.0%
370	March 1, 2014	13.7%
371	March 8, 2014	11.1%
372	March 15, 2014	11.8%
373	March 22, 2014	11.5%
374	March 29, 2014	10.7%
375	April 5, 2014	10.0%
376	April 12, 2014	10.9%
377	May 3, 2014	10.1%
378	May 10, 2014	11.8%
379	May 17, 2014	11.6%
380	May 24, 2014	13.4%
381	May 31, 2014	12.6%
382	June 7, 2014	12.2%
383	June 14, 2014	11.4%
384	June 21, 2014	12.7%
385	June 28, 2014	9.1%
386	July 5, 2014	9.9%
387	July 12, 2014	10.0%
388	July 19, 2014	10.2%
389	July 26, 2014	11.8%
390	August 2, 2014	12.6%
391	August 9, 2014	11.6%
392	August 16, 2014	12.3%
393	August 23, 2014	11.1%
394	August 30, 2014	13.1%
395	September 6, 2014	12.3%
396	September 13, 2014	11.8%
397	September 20, 2014	12.7%
398	October 4, 2014	10.3%
399	October 11, 2014	12.5%
400	October 18, 2014	12.4%
401	October 25, 2014	10.9%
402	November 1, 2014	12.5%
403	November 8, 2014	14.2%
404	November 15, 2014	13.3%
405	November 22, 2014	14.0%
406	November 29, 2014	13.8%
407	December 6, 2014	13.5%
408	December 13, 2014	14.6%
409	December 20, 2014	15.3%
410	December 27, 2014	19.8%

List of 2015 ratings (episodes 411–460)

Episode	Original airdate	AGB Nielsen Nationwide ratings
411	January 3, 2015	22.2%
412	January 10, 2015	14.1%
413	January 24, 2015	13.9%
414	February 7, 2015	12.7%
415	February 14, 2015	13.7%
416	February 21, 2015	13.0%
417	February 28, 2015	13.2%
418	March 7, 2015	13.3%
419	March 14, 2015	12.2%
420	March 21, 2015	13.5%
421	March 28, 2015	13.2%
422	April 4, 2015	15.0%
423	April 11, 2015	12.6%
424	April 18, 2015	12.9%
425	April 25, 2015	12.2%
426	May 2, 2015	11.3%
427	May 9, 2015	11.3%
428	May 16, 2015	11.7%
429	May 23, 2015	10.6%
430	May 30, 2015	13.1%
431	June 6, 2015	13.0%
432	June 13, 2015	12.1%
433	June 20, 2015	16.5%
434	June 27, 2015	13.4%
435	July 4, 2015	15.6%
436	July 11, 2015	14.9%
437	July 18, 2015	16.1%
438	July 25, 2015	15.2%
439	August 1, 2015	14.1%
440	August 8, 2015	14.5%
441	August 15, 2015	15.2%
442	August 22, 2015	21.1%
443	August 29, 2015	15.1%
444	September 5, 2015	16.9%
445	September 12, 2015	14.8%
446	September 19, 2015	14.9%
447	September 26, 2015	16.0%
448	October 3, 2015	13.4%
449	October 10, 2015	14.8%
450	October 17, 2015	13.7%
451	October 24, 2015	14.0%
452	October 31, 2015	14.4%
453	November 7, 2015	14.6%
454	November 14, 2015	11.6%
455	November 21, 2015	14.1%
456	November 28, 2015	13.2%
457	December 5, 2015	13.8%
458	December 12, 2015	12.4%
459	December 19, 2015	12.6%
460	December 26, 2015	14.8%

List of 2016 ratings (episodes 461–513)

Episode	Original airdate	AGB Nielsen Nationwide Ratings
461	January 2, 2016	17.0%
462	January 9, 2016	13.4%
463	January 16, 2016	12.8%
464	January 23, 2016	17.4%
465	January 30, 2016	15.6%
466	February 6, 2016	16.5%
467	February 13, 2016	16.2%
468	February 20, 2016	14.6%
469	February 27, 2016	12.7%
470	March 5, 2016	13.0%
471	March 12, 2016	12.0%
472	March 19, 2016	11.3%
473	March 26, 2016	11.5%
474	April 2, 2016	10.8%
475	April 9, 2016	13.6%
476	April 16, 2016	15.0%
477	April 23, 2016	14.3%
478	April 30, 2016	16.4%
479	May 7, 2016	11.4%
480	May 14, 2016	12.0%
481	May 21, 2016	13.5%
482	May 28, 2016	13.8%
483	June 4, 2016	14.2%
484	June 11, 2016	13.3%
485	June 18, 2016	13.1%
486	June 25, 2016	12.1%
487	July 2, 2016	13.0%
488	July 9, 2016	12.1%
489	July 16, 2016	15.0%
490	July 23, 2016	12.3%
491	July 30, 2016	11.8%
492	August 6, 2016	11.8%
493	August 13, 2016	13.0%
494	August 20, 2016	13.9%
495	August 27, 2016	14.7%
496	September 3, 2016	15.7%
497	September 10, 2016	13.3%
498	September 17, 2016	14.1%
499	September 24, 2016	13.8%
500	October 1, 2016	14.0%
501	October 8, 2016	12.6%
502	October 15, 2016	12.5%
503	October 22, 2016	12.4%
504	October 29, 2016	11.8%
505	November 5, 2016	13.1%
506	November 12, 2016	12.3%
507	November 19, 2016	14.9%
508	November 26, 2016	14.0%
509	December 3, 2016	11.7%
510	December 10, 2016	12.8%
511	December 17, 2016	12.9%
512	December 24, 2016	10.8%
513	December 31, 2016	11.9%

List of 2017 ratings (episodes 514–551)

Episode	Original airdate	AGB Nielsen Nationwide Ratings
514	January 7, 2017	12.5%
515	January 14, 2017	15.4%
516	January 21, 2017	12.6%
517	February 18, 2017	8.9%
518	February 25, 2017	8.0%
519	March 4, 2017	9.0%
520	March 11, 2017	9.1%
521	March 18, 2017	10.8%
522	March 25, 2017	11.2%
523	April 1, 2017	11.4%
524	April 8, 2017	8.9%
525	April 15, 2017	10.2%
526	April 22, 2017	9.8%
527	April 29, 2017	10.8%
528	May 6, 2017	9.6%
529	May 13, 2017	12.0%
530	May 20, 2017	9.8%
531	May 27, 2017	10.2%
532	June 3, 2017	10.0%
533	June 10, 2017	10.9%
534	June 17, 2017	12.5%
535	June 24, 2017	10.1%
536	July 1, 2017	11.7%
537	July 8, 2017	14.5%
538	July 15, 2017	14.9%
539	July 22, 2017	12.1%
540	July 29, 2017	11.1%
541	August 5, 2017	9.8%
542	August 12, 2017	9.6%
543	August 19, 2017	10.8%
544	August 26, 2017	8.8%
545	September 2, 2017	9.2%
546	November 25, 2017	9.8%
547	December 2, 2017	9.6%
548	December 9, 2017	11.9%
549	December 16, 2017	9.8%
550	December 23, 2017	11.2%
551	December 30, 2017	10.4%

List of 2018 ratings (episodes 552–563 + 3 specials)

Episode	Original airdate	AGB Nielsen Nationwide Ratings
552	January 6, 2018	11.4%
553	January 13, 2018	11.7%
554	January 20, 2018	12.7%
555	January 27, 2018	14.3%
556	February 3, 2018	12.5%
557	February 17, 2018	8.3%
557	February 17, 2018	13.6%
558	February 24, 2018	12.5%
558	February 24, 2018	13.0%
559	March 3, 2018	10.8%
560	March 10, 2018	11.3%
561	March 17, 2018	11.0%
561	March 17, 2018	14.3%
562	March 24, 2018	9.6%
562	March 24, 2018	12.8%
563 (End)	March 31, 2018	9.3%
563 (End)	March 31, 2018	11.1%
Special
1	April 7, 2018	5.3%
1	April 7, 2018	6.4%
2	April 14, 2018	5.6%
2	April 14, 2018	7.0%
3	April 21, 2018	3.9%
3	April 21, 2018	5.2%

== The show in popular culture ==
- During the 12th episode (aired on August 16, 2007) of MBC's Monday-night variety programme 'Jippijiggi'(지피지기), comedian Park Su-hong urged Noh Hong-chul, Jeong Hyeong-don, and Ha Ha (members of Infinite Challenge) to create a new comic-variety program called 'Yuhan Dojeon'(유한도전, 有限挑戰, Finite Challenge). However, this was a joke when he attended this program as a guest.
- MBC Drama, MBC's Drama and Entertainment channel on Skylife and Cable TV, has decided to launch a brand-new comic variety show called Infinite Girls (무한걸스), the female edition of Infinite Challenge. Six Korean entertainers including Song Eun-i, Shin Bong-sun, Kim Shin-young, Hwangbo, Baek Bo-ram and Jung Ga-eun serve as the co-hosts of this program. Previous hosts who have already left the show include Ahn Hye-kyung (안혜경, who is former Haha's girlfriend), Kim Hyun-sook (김현숙), Bin-woo (빈우), Kim Ga-yeon and Jung Shi-ah. It aired on September 23, 2007, as a pilot (special) program for Hangawi holidays. Since October 15, 2007, This format went a regular-scheduled programme at the MBC every1, MBC's Cable and Satellite network for comedy and variety shows, eventually.
- On December 27, 2007, the SERI, a well-known economic research institute of South Korea, picked this program as the 6th most-influential product and service of the year 2007, due to its strong public popularity and its own productive characters.
- Infinite Challenge is often mentioned on other similar programs, when guests asking if the staff of the show in question copied the idea for a segment from Infinite Challenge.
- In the first quarter of 2008, the Global Marketing Department of MBC reported that MBC had attempted to sell the format of Infinite Challenge to a European agency in Sweden. This was the first time in Korean television history that such a deal had been made. However, the contract was not finalized, as there were too many characters on the program for the Swedish company to reproduce. Even so, rights to the show were eventually sold to Air France and Qatar Airways' in-flight broadcast.
- The creators of Infinite Challenge filmed an advertisement about Bibimbap which has been shown in Times Square since November 26, 2010. Due to this involvement, the Ministry for Food, Agriculture, Forestry and Fisheries had been put up a Plaque of Honour, to acknowledge MuDo's dedication.
- In 2011, Infinite Challenge held the West Coast Highway Music Festival. At this festival 7 teams participated and everyone got a trophy.
- The show is also famous for its loyal fans, especially from the youth demographic. Despite the show's hiatus of 22 weeks due to MBC's Union Labor Strike in 2012, the show was able to keep its strong popularity with television audiences. It was acclaimed as "the most favorite program in South Korea" numerous times.
- Members of Infinite Challenge cast (Yoo Jae-suk, Park Myeong-su, Jeong Jun-ha, Jeong Hyeong-don, Noh Hong-chul, Haha, Gil) are featured on "Gentleman" music video by Psy.

== International ==
- On June 30, 2015, the rights to air the show was sold to one of the big channels in China; "CCTV-1" proving Infinite Challenge's rise in popularity as a Korean Variety Show Program. The Chinese version of the show started airing in China on December 6, 2015.
- Before the export publication rights to China, the program was already popular throughout Asia. People of the world watched this program by YouTube and the highest hit is 3,202,248 (Infinite Challenge Yeongdong Expressway Song Festival, Hwangtaeji's "Mapsosa".)
- The program went to Japan, China, Thailand, America, Africa, Germany, etc. for filming. Many international celebrities participated in one of the episodes.
- In March 2013, a British TV program called The Greatest Shows on Earth came to Korea to showcase Korean TV, and visited Infinite Challenge on set. The episode aired on Channel 4 on July 8, 2013. While visiting the recording session for Infinite Challenge, presenter Daisy Donovan also went in front of the cameras and guested a sketch segment which was shown on both shows.

== Plagiarism ==
It has been alleged that the show was copied without permission by a Chinese variety program called Go Fighting.

According to production company MBC: "Currently in China, multiple broadcasting and production companies are saying they are personally producing 'Infinite Challenge' or a similar program, causing a disturbance in the market and damaging MBC Contents' image. From hereon, excepting the broadcasting of 'Infinite Challenge' on CCTV1, we will take firm legal action against any behavior that has nothing to do with MBC while making people confused and misunderstand [that program] as MBC's 'Infinite Challenge."
