= The Dynamic Duo (TV program) =

- Promotional poster
- Genre: Variety show
- Directed by: Jeon Sung Ho
- Starring: Lee Kyung-kyu; Park Myeong-su; Kim Gura; Seo Jang-hoon; Eun Ji-won; Kwon Hyuk-soo; Lee Gi-kwang
- Country of origin: South Korea
- Original language: Korean
- No. of episodes: 10

Original release
- Network: tvN
- Release: March 26 – June 2, 2017

The Dynamic Duo (Korean: 공조7), also known as Cooperation 7, is a South Korean variety show distributed and syndicated by tvN every Friday at 23:30 (KST).

== Cast ==
- Lee Kyung-kyu
- Park Myeong-su
- Kim Gura
- Seo Jang-hoon
- Eun Ji-won
- Kwon Hyuk-soo
- Lee Gi-kwang

== Plot ==
Each episode features the cast being paired up into 'duos' and competing in various unscripted challenges in order to determine who is the best duo in entertainment.

== Ratings ==
Episode #	Broadcast Date	AGB Ratings	TNMS Ratings
1	March 26, 2017	1.2%	1.7%
2	April 2, 2017	1.0%	1.4%
3	April 9, 2017	1.0%	1.3%
4	April 16, 2017	0.9%	1.1%
5	April 23, 2017	1.3%	1.5%
6	April 30, 2017	1.0%	1.4%
7	May 12, 2017	1.0%	1.2%
8	May 19, 2017	0.6%	0.9%
9	May 26, 2017	0.9%	0.8%
10	June 2, 2017	0.6%	0.6%
