= The Great Challenge =

- Also known as: Infinite Challenge
- Genre: Comedy, Variety, Reality
- Starring: Tim Le; Sa Beining; Sha Yi; Ethan Juan; Negmat Rahman; Yue Yunpeng
- Country of origin: China
- Original language: Chinese
- No. of episodes: 12

Original release
- Network: CCTV-1; Xing Kong
- Release: December 6, 2015 – March 27, 2016

The Great Challenge (Chinese: 了不起的挑战) was a Chinese variety show that aired between 2015 and 2016. It is a remake of the Korean show Infinite Challenge.

== Members ==
=== Current members ===
- Tim Le
- Sa Beining
- Sha Yi
- Ethan Juan
- Negmat Rahman (Episode 3-12)
- Yue Yunpeng

=== Former members ===
- Hu Qiaohua (Episode 1-2)

== List of episodes ==
List of all episodes
Episode #	Air Date	Synopsis	Guest/Notes
1	December 6, 2015	Yes Or No: Find the Delicious	
2	December 13, 2015	Part-Time Jobs	
3	January 3, 2016	The Great News	The members deliver the news of Hu Qiaohua leaving the show, and introduces the new member Negmet Rahman.
3	January 3, 2016	The Fortune-Gathering Road: Let's Start A Business	Ray Lui (enterprise mentor)
4	January 20, 2016	The Great Firemen	Jin Guobiao (Monitor), Jiang Yuhang (Sergeant)
5	January 24, 2016	Special Movement	Tim Le did not appear due to physical problems. Sun Yang, Zhu Ying (swimming coach), Hangzhou Sports School swimmers
6	January 31, 2016	Life Exchange	
7	February 21, 2016	Protect the Earth	
8	February 28, 2016	Part-Time Jobs II	
9	March 6, 2016	Yue Yunpeng & Sa Beining's Harvest Time	
10	March 13, 2016	Sha Yi Got Scared by A Bamboo Rat	
11	March 20, 2016	Thank You [SP]	
12	March 27, 2016	Traditional Way of Making Pop Corn	
