= Kwon Hyuk-soo (actor) =

South Korean actor, singer, and comedian

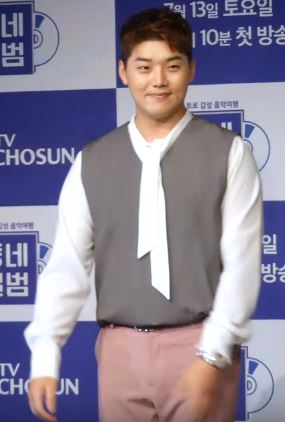
- Kwon in July 2019
- Born: May 6, 1986 (age 40); South Korea
- Education: Seoul Institute of the Arts
- Occupation: Actor
- Agent: Arty Factory (아티팩토리)

Korean name
- Hangul: 권혁수
- Hanja: 權赫洙
- RR: Gwon Hyeoksu
- MR: Kwŏn Hyŏksu

Kwon Hyuk-soo (Korean: 권혁수; born May 6, 1986) is a South Korean actor, singer and comedian. He made his debut on second season of Saturday Night Live Korea and continue to be main cast until season 9.

== Early life and education ==
Kwon Hyuk-soo was born on May 6, 1986. From an early age, he was frequently described as unique and eccentric. Known for his mischievous nature, Kwon celebrated April Fool's Day as his personal holiday during his school years. He enjoyed playing pranks and teasing his friends, often taking the initiative to break the ice at the beginning of each new semester.

In 2005, Kwon enrolled in the Theater Department at the Seoul Institute of the Arts, joining a cohort that included Lee Dong-hwi, from the same department, as well as Lee Si-eon and Kim Seon-ho from other department. Kwon was an exceptional student, earning a 4.43 GPA and a full scholarship after ranking first in his department. He considered the scholarships the best "part-time job" to help him save for tuition following his military service. He served as the 25th president of the school's theater club, "Attempt at Encounter." While working part-time at a theater, he also managed to master both Chinese and Japanese.

== Career ==
After graduating with his bachelor's degree in 2012, Kwon Hyuk-soo made his debut in the second season of Saturday Night Live Korea. He joined the cast upon the recommendation of director Jang Jin, who was his senior from the Seoul Institute of the Arts and had noticed him at a private gathering. This marked the beginning of his career as an actor, singer, and comedian.

== Philanthrophy ==
NGO Good People appointed Kwon Hyuk-soo as a sharing ambassador on August 12, 2020. Kwon's relationship with the organization began in April when he participated in their "Star Mask" campaign, which supported out-of-school, multicultural, and low-income youths affected by COVID-19.

== Filmography ==
=== Films ===
Year	Title	Role
2012	Bystanders	School Bully attacker
2014	My Love, My Bride	pork restaurant deliver guy

=== Television series ===
Year	Title	Role	Notes/Ref.
2015	Let's Eat 2	sexual offender	Guest appearance, Ep. 13
2015	The Superman Age	Bank employee	Guest
2015	Girl of 0AM	Farewell man	Guest
2015	D-Day		
2015	Eating Existence	Lee Hoon Joong	Guest
2016	Dear My Friends	Oh Se-oh	
2016	Lucky Romance	Jo Yoon-bal	
2016	Bring It On, Ghost	Client	Cameo appearance, Ep. 16
2016	Something About 1%	CEO Han	Cameo
2016	Ugly Miss Young-ae 15		
2016	Night Light		
2017	Missing 9	Prosecutor Jo Sung-gook	
2017	Strong Girl Bong-soon	Nizamuddin/Cho Dal-bong	Guest, Ep. 12-13
2017	Circle	Detective Oh	
2018	Come and Hug Me	Kim Jong-hyun	
2018	Devilish Charm		Special appearance
2018	Still 17	CEO Park	Guest, Ep 13-14
2019	Flower Crew: Joseon Marriage Agency	Eunuch	Cameo, Ep 13

=== Web series ===
Year	Title	Role	Notes	Ref.
2021	Replay: The Moment	Lee In-ho	Special appearance	
2022	Returning Student: Grade A, but Love is F	Hyuk-soo		

=== Television shows ===
Year	Title	Role	Ref.
2012	SNL Korea	Main cast	
2016	Singing Battle – Victory	Participant	
2017	The Dynamic Duo	Main cast	
2017	One Night Food Trip 2	Main cast	
2017	Candy In My Ears 2	Main cast	
2021	Saturday Night Live Korea	Main Cast	

=== Web shows ===
Year	Title	Role	Notes	Ref.
2021	Baekdol's Great Escape	Host	with Lee Ji-hoon	
2021	Benjamin Kwon's Imagination Becomes Reality	Kwon Benjamin	with Shin Ki-jin	
2021	God Star	Host		

== Awards and nominations ==
Award	Year	Category	Nominated work	Result
54th Baeksang Arts Awards	2018	Best Variety Performer – Male	SNL Korea	Nominated
tvN10 Awards	2016	Made in tvN, Actor in Variety	SNL Korea	Nominated
tvN10 Awards	2016	Variety "Slave" Award	SNL Korea	Won
