= Bragging Room Guest =

- Promotional poster
- Genre: Liberal arts education
- Starring: Park Myung-soo; Kim Hee-chul
- Country of origin: South Korea
- Original language: Korean
- No. of episodes: 2

Original release
- Network: KBS, KBS2
- Release: March 16 – March 23, 2017

Bragging Room Guest (Korean: 자랑방손님) was a KBS variety show, co-hosted by Park Myung-soo and Kim Hee-chul.

== Format ==
The sheer number of TV and radio programs dedicated in sharing viewers' worries and difficulties seems to convey that most of our lives are filled with shame and regrets over our mistakes and failures. However, mistakes and failures are the fertilizer of success and what make us stronger and better. In Bragging Room Guest, viewers share their life stories in a form of bragging. For the first time in Korea's broadcasting history, the show hosts will film the show at their home, and viewers will be able to communicate with the hosts while watching the live streaming of the show.

== List of episodes ==
Episode	Air Date	Guests	Rating
1	March 16, 2017	Song Hae, Han Hyun-min, Maasung	2.6%
2	March 23, 2017	Kim Bok-Jun, Lee Dae-hoon, Maasung, Choi Byeong-ju	1.9%
