= Park Myung-soo =

South Korean comedian and singer (born 1970)

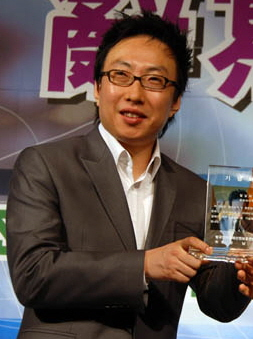
- Park on April 4, 2008
- Born: August 27, 1970 (age 56); Gunsan, South Korea
- Notable work: Member of Infinite Challenge; Singer of "Prince of the Sea"; Host of Happy Together
- Spouse: Han Soo-min (m. 2008)
- Children: Park Min-seo (daughter)

Comedy career
- Years active: 1993–present
- Medium: Stand-up; television presenter; singer; composer; producer; DJ; Philanthropist
- Genre: Comedy

Korean name
- Hangul: 박명수
- Hanja: 朴明洙
- RR: Bak Myeongsu
- MR: Pak Myŏngsu

Park Myung-soo (Korean: 박명수; born August 27, 1970) is a South Korean comedian, MC, singer, and songwriter who debuted on television in 1993, appearing on MBC. He co-hosted the top-rated comic variety programme Infinite Challenge and also hosted the Date at 2 o'clock radio show. He has released several music singles, including "Prince of the Sea", which was covered by LPG in 2007.

== Career ==
=== Infinite Challenge ===
On Infinite Challenge, Park is "the second-in-command" (2인자), putting him below the host-in-chief Yoo Jae-suk, who is "the first-in-command" (1인자). This spawned a running gag in which he often jokes about overthrowing Yoo Jae-suk as leader and becoming "first-in-command" himself. He also called "Rice Insect" (벼멸구), a rival nickname for Yoo Jae-suk's famous "Grasshopper". He also claimed that his nickname should be "Big Star" (거성/巨星 Geoseong). He sometimes tries to make use of his seniority by lecturing the other members on various matters, such as becoming a star; however, they rarely take him seriously.

Another nickname is "Chicken CEO," in reference to the Kyochon chicken shop which he formerly operated. He is currently a Seoul metropolitan manager of Imsil Cheese Pizza restaurant.

In October 2007, Park acquired another nickname, "worthless elder brother" (하찮은 형) after co-host Noh Hong-chul referred to him as a "worthless person with a worthless body" (하찮은 박명수님, 하찮은 몸) in comparison to world-class Figure skater Kim Yuna. Another related nickname is "Father" (아버지) since he is the oldest among another Infinite Challenge members and due to his weak stamina and slowly balding forehead.

Park is famous for his "scolding" repertoire (호통개그), in which he angrily and aggressively scolds his colleagues for usually trivial matters. This led to another nickname, "the Son of Devil" (악마의 아들). A related nickname is "Old Devil", based on co-host Noh Hong-chul's nickname the "Young Devil" received in the "Money Bag" special episode in which te two had stolen a briefcase full of money from Jeong Hyeong-don and subsequently conspired to take it from each other. Another aspect of his character is his tendency to flub words and to misspeak when scolding, leading other members to take him even less seriously.

His character in the show is also known for arguing and quarreling over petty issues with co-host Jeong Jun-ha. Park's hot-tempered on-screen persona is very contrary to Jeong Jun-ha's tactless, simple-minded character that occasionally made the former lose his patience. The unique relationship between Jeong and Park has become an occasional segment called "Ha & Soo". "Ha & Soo" also can be called "Peter & Jonathan" with Park as "Peter" and Jeong as "Jonathan". Another similar nickname is "Red Pepper" (고춧가루) after Jeong joked about him and Park as seasonings ("red pepper and black pepper") for Yoo Jae-suk that being central of the program ("main menu") during Infinite Challenge "Face-Off" special. The two have also won the "Best Couple" award at the 2011 MBC Entertainment Awards, making them the first male-male couple to have ever won the title.

=== Radio ===
Park is also a recognised radio DJ, hosting various radio shows over the past decades. In 2016 and 2021, he received the Best Radio DJ award at the KBS Entertainment Awards for his Cool FM Park Myung-soo's Radio Show.

=== Music career ===
Being an avid fan of electronic music, Park, under the pseudonym "Bangbaedong Wildcat", composed a total of six songs in varied genres, including electronic, medium-tempo dance and mystic melodies. These were showcased by his fellow co-hosts of the program during the Infinite Challenge "Park Myung-soo's How About It" special. Upon the broadcast, his tracks appeared on the real-time music charts for Mnet, Bugs, Naver Music, and Melon, and even ousted out Girls' Generation's newly released "I Got a Boy" track from the first place on the chart for a period of time. Since January 2013, he has been listed as an official composer by the Korea Music Copyright Association (KOMCA) under his "Bangbaedong Wildcat" name.

=== Recognitions ===
Park won his first Daesang, the award given to the entertainer of the year, at the 2012 MBC Entertainment Awards after 20 years of his career as an entertainer.

== Personal life ==
=== Marriage and children ===
On April 8, 2008, Park Myung-soo married his long-time girlfriend, 31-year-old doctor Han Su-min. This was the first time a member of Infinite Challenge has married since the show's inception. Their first child, Park Min-seo, was born in August 2008.

As of December 2009, with the joint co-operation of its enterprise company, he began his tenure as a CEO of a business called "Mohani" (모하니), which sells wigs in shopping malls.

=== Mental health and bullying ===
He confessed that he has suffered from anxiety since he was young due to being bullied severely when he was in school, to the point of being considered a loser by the students who picked on him and to the point where he developed generalized anxiety as consequence.

== Television and radio appearances ==
=== Current programmes ===
Year	Title	Role	Ref.
2010	Undercover Boss (US edition)	Korean Narrator	
2018	We Are the One		
2018	South Korean Foreigners	Host	
2021	Leader's Love	Host	
2021	The Man Who Writes a Wife Card	Host	
2021	A Leader's Day	Cast member	
2021	Doo-Tap Nom	Host with Haha	
2022	Animal Theatre Best Friend	MC with Lee Geum-hee	
2022	Colossus Park Myung-soo	Host with Gabi	
2023	Rice Planting Club	Host	

=== Former programmes ===
Year	Title	Role	Ref.
April – July 2005; October 2005 – 2018	Infinite Challenge	Co-host	
	Come to Play		
2007 – 2018	Happy Together Season 3	Co-host	
	X-man	Joint Panel	
	A CEO that met by Park Myung-soo	Host	
2007 – 2008	Jippijiggi	Co-host	
2006 – 2008	Sunday Sunday Night – Dong-an Club	Co-host	
2008	Brain Battle	Co-host	
2008	Sunday Sunday Night – We Got Married	Co-host	
2008	Economy Vitamin	Joint Panel	
2010	Sunday Sunday Night – Hot Brothers	Host-in-chief	
	Oh My School/100 points out of 100	Host	
2012	Quiz Show Q	Co-host	
2015	Brave Family	A role as Uncle	
2016 – 2017	Fantastic Duo	Regular Panelist	
2017	The Dynamic Duo	Host	
2017	Jobs	Host	
2017	Bragging Room Guest	Host with Kim Hee-chul	
2017 – 2018	All the World's Broadcasts	Host	
2017 – 2020	Salty Tour	Host	
2019	Happy Farmers S3	Cast	
2019	Show! Audio Jockey	AJ	
2019	Six-Party Talks		
2019 – 2020	Rewind	Team Leader	
2021	Soo Mi's Mountain Cabin	Cast member	
2021–2023	Saturday Meals Love	Cast member	
2024	My Name is Gabriel	Cast member	

=== Radio programmes ===
Year	Title	Radio Station
	Park Myung-soo's Fun Fun Radio	MBC FM4U
2008 – 2010	Park Myung-soo's 2 o'clock Date	MBC FM4U
2015 – present	Park Myung-soo's Radio Show	KBS Cool FM

== Discography ==
=== Studio albums ===
- Change (1999)
- Dr. Park (2000)
- Son of Wind (바람의 아들) (2002)
- Ta La La (탈랄라) (2005)

=== Singles ===
Title	Year	Peak chart positions	Sales	Album
Title	Year	KOR	Sales	Album
"Prince of the Sea" (바다의 왕자)	2000	—		Dr. Park
"Son of Wind" (바람의 아들)	2002	—		Son of Wind
"We Love Dokdo"	2005	—		Ta La La
"Deep in the Night (Ta La La)" (탈랄라)	2005	—		Ta La La
"I Love You"	2007	—		Infinite Challenge Gangbyeon Road Concert
"To Fool... From Fool" (바보에게... 바보가)	2008	—		Non-album single
"Cold Noodle" (냉면) (feat. Jessica Jung)	2009	—		Infinite Challenge Olympic Highway Duet Song Festival
"Fyah" (feat. Gill)	2010	20		Non-album singles
"Whale" (고래) (feat. Nicole Jung)	2010	12	KOR: 940,839	Non-album singles
"Having An Affair" (바람났어) (with G-Dragon, feat. Park Bom)	2011	1	KOR: 3,625,939	Infinite Challenge West Coast Highway Music Festival
"Clown" (광대) (feat. Kim Bum-soo)	2012	11	KOR: 685,839	Infinite Challenge I Am a Singer
"Endless Dream" (꿈이었을까) (with Jungyup)	2012	18	KOR: 498,301	Non-album singles
"You're My Girl"	2013	84	KOR: 34,061	Non-album singles
"Aqua Paradise" (아쿠아 파라다이스)	2013	—		Non-album singles
"I Got C" (with Primary, feat. Gaeko)	2013	1	KOR: 602,173	Infinite Challenge Jayu-ro Song Festival
"Myung Soo's Tteokbokki" (명수네 떡볶이) (feat. Lim Kim and UL)	2014	2	KOR: 520,923	Non-album singles
"Don't Go" (with DJ Charles, feat. Kim Shin-young)	2014	—	KOR: 16,468	Non-album singles
"Goodbye PMS" (with Lizzy)	2015	—		Non-album singles
"Fool" (바보야) (with So Chan-whee)	2015	51	KOR: 55,959	Non-album singles
"Leon" (레옹) (with IU)	2015	1	KOR: 1,600,230	Infinite Challenge Yeongdong Expressway Music Festival
"Tarzan" (타잔) (feat. U Jae-hwan and Hye Sung)	2016	—		Non-album single
"Dokdori" (독도리) (with DinDin, feat. Mad Clown)	2016	16	KOR: 234,113	Infinite Challenge Great Legacy
"Saxophone Magic" (with DinDin and Danny Jung, feat. U Jae-hwan and Cho Hee)	2017	—		Non-album singles
"Poison Apple" (독사과) (with Park Na-rae)	2018	—		Non-album singles
"SNS" (with Hyojung)	2018	—		Non-album singles
"Today, Tomorrow and Always Love You" (오늘 내일 그리고 사랑해)	2021	—		Non-album singles
"—" denotes a recording that did not chart.

== Ambassadorship ==
- Ambassadors for Island Day (2022)

== Accolades ==
=== Awards ===
Year presented, name of the award ceremony, award category, nominated work and the result of the nomination
Year	Awards show	Category	Nominated work	Result
1993	MBC Gag Contest	Special Award		Won
2005	5th MBC Entertainment Award	Popular Actor of Show Variety	Infinite Challenge	Won
2006	18th Korea Broadcasting Producers	Comedian Award		Won
2006	6th MBC Entertainment Award	Top Excellence Award (Show/Variety)	Infinite Challenge	Won
2007	7th MBC Entertainment Award	The Grand Prize with Infinite Challenge	Infinite Challenge	Won
2007	7th MBC Entertainment Award	Special Division woojeongsang	Infinite Challenge	Won
2007	7th MBC Entertainment Award	Bizarre special category Awards, Momgaegeu Award	Infinite Challenge	Won
2008	44th Baeksang Arts Awards	TV Entertainment Award	Happy Together	Won
2008	89th National Athletics Competition	Aerobics enthusiasts general portion 6 Artificial second place with Infinite Challenge	Infinite Challenge	Won
2008	8th MBC Entertainment Award	Best Program Award (Infinite Challenge)	Infinite Challenge	Won
2009	Melon Music Awards	Specialty albums – Naengmyun (냉면)		Won
2009	9th MBC Entertainment Award	PD Award with Infinite Challenge	Infinite Challenge	Won
2009	MBC Drama Awards	Excellence radio sector / Good (MC) of Radio	Park Myung-soo's 2 o'clock Date	Won
2010	4th M.net 20's Choice	20's Most Influential Star		Won
2010	A 5th Annual Awards	Best Black collar worker		Won
2010	KBS Entertainment Awards	Best Entertainer Award	Happy Together	Won
2010	KBS Entertainment Awards	Best Teamwork Award with Happy Together	Happy Together	Won
2010	10th MBC Entertainment Award	Best humiliation Award	Infinite Challenge	Won
2010	10th MBC Entertainment Award	Top Excellence Award – Variety Show	Infinite Challenge	Won
2011	11th MBC Entertainment Award	Best Couple Award with Jeong Jun-ha	Infinite Challenge	Won
2011	The 53rd Annual National Rowing Championships	2000m Novice Inn (Special Award) with Infinite Challenge	Infinite Challenge	Won
2012	12th MBC Entertainment Award	Daesang (Grand Prize)	Infinite Challenge, I Am a Singer (season 2), Indulge in Comedy	Won
2013	13th MBC Entertainment Award	Most Popular Program with Infinite Challenge members	Infinite Challenge	Won
2014	14th MBC Entertainment Award	Best entertainment program on viewers Choice with Infinite Challenge	Infinite Challenge	Won
2015	14th KBS Entertainment Awards	Top Excellence Award – Variety Show	Happy Together	Won
2016	15th KBS Entertainment Awards	Best Radio DJ	KBS Cool FM – Park Myung-soo's Radio Show	Won
2017	17th MBC Entertainment Awards	Top Excellence Award – Variety Show	Infinite Challenge	Won
2017	11th SBS Entertainment Awards	Scene Steeler Award	Single Wife	Won
2021	19th KBS Entertainment Awards	DJ of the Year	KBS Cool FM – Park Myung-soo's Radio Show	Won
2022	Brand Customer Loyalty Award 2022	Male Celebrity YouTuber	—N/a	Won

=== State honors ===
Name of country, year given, and name of honor or award
Country	Year	Honor or Award	Ref.
South Korea (Note: Honors are given at the Korean Popular Culture and Arts Awards, arranged by the Korea Creative Content Agency and hosted by the Ministry of Culture, Sports and Tourism. They are awarded to those who have contributed to the arts and South Korea's pop culture.)	2022	Prime Minister's Commendation	

=== Listicles ===
Name of publisher, year listed, name of listicle, and placement
Publisher	Year	Listicle	Placement	Ref.
Forbes	2011	Korea Power Celebrity	39th	

== Notes ==
Awards and achievements
Preceded by Kim Sung-min; Kim Tae-won; Lee Ha-neul	KBS Entertainment Awards for Best Entertainer; 2010	Succeeded by Uhm Tae-woong; Jun Hyun-moo
