= Jung Hyung-don =

South Korean entertainer (born 1978)

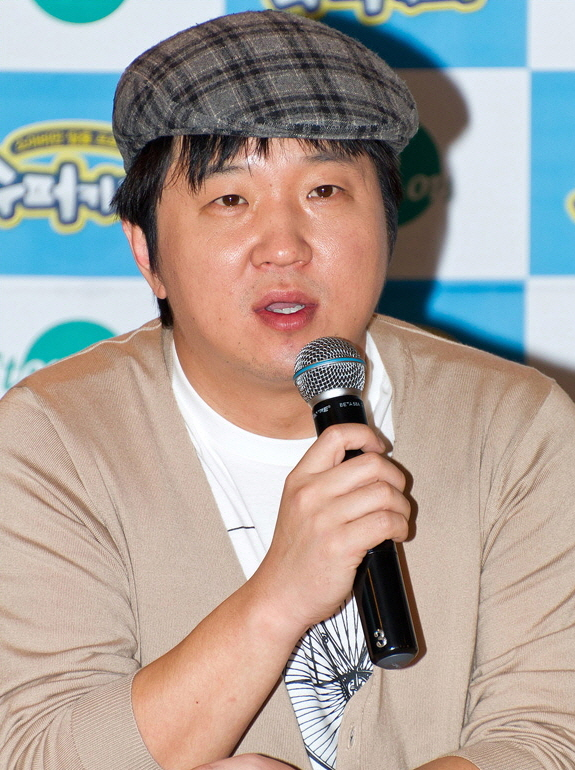
- Jeong in 2011
- Born: March 15, 1978 (age 48); Gimcheon, South Korea
- Spouse: Han Yu-ra (m. 2009)
- Children: 2

Comedy career
- Years active: 2002–present
- Medium: Television, music
- Genres: Physical comedy, comedy music

Korean name
- Hangul: 정형돈
- Hanja: 鄭亨敦
- RR: Jeong Hyeongdon
- MR: Chŏng Hyŏngdon
- Website: Official website

Jung Hyung-don (Korean: 정형돈; born March 15, 1978) is a South Korean comedian and television host. He is best known for his roles on the variety shows Infinite Challenge and Weekly Idol.

== Early life and education ==
Jung was born in Gimcheon in North Gyeongsang Province, South Korea. As a child, he moved with his family to Busan, where he later attended Busan Electronic Technical High School. After graduation, he worked for Samsung Electronics in Suwon for six years before entering the entertainment industry.

== Career ==
Jung made his television debut on the sketch comedy show Gag Concert in 2002. On the show, he performed a sketch called "Do-Re-Mi Trio," in which he and two other comedians sang excerpts of popular songs, adding comedic punch lines to the end.

In 2005, Jung joined the cast of a new variety show called Infinite Challenge. Though the show initially had low viewership ratings, it went on to be a hit, and several of the songs Jung recorded for the show's periodic "song festivals" charted in the top ten of South Korea's music charts.

Jung joined the cast of the first season of the marriage simulation show We Got Married in 2008. He was initially paired with television personality Saori until her departure from the show. He was later paired with singer Taeyeon of Girls' Generation. The match caused an uproar from Girls' Generation fans, in part due to the 11-year age gap between the two entertainers.

In 2011, Jung and rapper Defconn became co-hosts of the new idol-focused reality show Weekly Idol.

=== Hiatus ===
In November 2015, Jung's agency, FNC Entertainment, announced that he was taking a break from all activities due to his anxiety disorder. At the time, he was a cast member or host on several television shows, including Infinite Challenge, Weekly Idol, and Please Take Care of My Refrigerator. Jung officially left the cast of Infinite Challenge in July 2016.

=== Return ===
Jung returned as the co-host of Weekly Idol in October 2016, ending his 11-month break from television activities. In March 2018, both Jung and Defconn left Weekly Idol. In May, they became hosts of the variety show Idol Room.

=== Second hiatus ===
On November 5, 2020, it was announced by Jung's agency FNC Entertainment that he will take another break from all activities due to anxiety disorder relapse. In October 2021, Jung decided not to renew his contract with FNC Entertainment.

On November 15, 2021, Jung founded the Matched Project (MCP) agency with Kim Yong-man, Kim Sung-joo, and Ahn Jung-hwan.

== Personal life ==
Jung married comedy writer Han Yu-ra on September 13, 2009. They have two children, twin daughters, who were born on December 11, 2012.

== Television appearances ==
=== Current programs ===
Year	Title	Role	Notes/Ref.
2018–2020; 2021–present	Problem Child in House (옥탑방의 문제아들)	Cast Member	Episode 1–105, 118-present
2021	Oh Eun-young's Golden Counseling Center	Host	
2022	Surprise: Secret Room	Host	
2022	Neighborhood Billiards	Host	
2022	Ahn Jung-hwan's Hidden Qatar	Regular Member	
2023	Rural Police Returns	Cast Member	Season 1–2
2025	Good Day	Cast Member	

=== Former programs ===
Year	Title	Role	Notes/Ref.
2002	Gag Concert (개그 콘서트)	Co-host	
2005–2007	Imagination Plus (상상플러스)	Co-host	
2005–2016	Infinite Challenge (무한도전)	Co-host	Episode 1–454
2007	Explore TV-Cool Guys (TV탐험 멋진친구들)	Co-host	
2008	Mystery Commandos (미스터리 특공대)	Host	
2009–2010	Sunday Sunday Night (단 하나의 비밀 단비 Only One Secret Danbi)	Co-host	
2011–2015	Weekly Idol (주간 아이돌)	Co-host	with Defconn
2012	GO Show (고쇼)	Co-host	
2013	Ba-ra-dun Bada (바라던 바다)	Co-host	Pilot show
2013	Uh-rap Show! (어랍쇼)	Co-host	
2013	Noon-Ssul-Mi (눈썰미)	Co-host	
2014–2015	Hitmaker (형돈이와 대준이의 히트제조기)	Co-host	with Defconn
2014–2015	Please Take Care of My Refrigerator (냉장고를 부탁해)	Co-host	with Kim Sung-joo
2014–2015	Our Neighborhood Arts and Physical Education (우리동네 예능과 체육의 능력자)	Co-host	
2016–2018	Weekly Idol (주간 아이돌)	Co-host	with Defconn
2016–2018	Carefree Travelers S1 (패키지로 세계일주 - 뭉쳐야 뜬다)	Co-host	
2017–2018	Night Goblin (밤도깨비)	Co-host	
2017–2018	Hyena on the Keyboard (건반 위의 하이에나)	Host	
2018	Dancing High (댄싱하이)	Host	
2018	Road to Paris (파리로 가는 길)	Co-host	Episode 1–2 with Lee Chae-young and Kim Pung
2018–2020	Idol Room (아이돌룸)	Co-host	Episode 1–87, alongside Defconn
2019	Prison Life of Fools (호구들의 감빵생활)	Cast Member	Episode 1–26
2020	Idol on Quiz (퀴즈 위의 아이돌)	Co-host	Episode 1–18 with Jang Sung-kyu
2022	legend festival	Host	
2022	Jump Like a Witch	Host	
2022	Accapella	Host	

=== Drama ===
- Rollercoaster (재밌는TV 롤러코스터, 2009~) Leading actor with Jeong Ga-eun

== Discography ==
=== Singles ===
Title	Year	Peak chart positions	Sales (DL)	Album
Title	Year	KOR	Sales (DL)	Album
As lead artist
"Spring Chicken Soup" (영계백숙)	2012	8	KOR: 565,691+	I'm A Singer in My Own Right
"Gangbuk Gentleman" (강북멋쟁이)	2013	1	KOR: 1,072,090+	Park Myung-soo's How About This?
Collaborations
"Jump" with Luna	2011	70	—N/a	Enjoy Today Rock Project
"The Innocent Macho" (순정마초) with Jung Jae-hyung	2011	5	KOR: 2,190,052+	Infinite Challenge West Coast Highway Festival
"Change The Game" with Defconn, JD	2011	39	KOR: 292,266+	Non-album single
"Going To Try" (해볼라고) with G-Dragon	2013	2	KOR: 790,713+	Infinite Challenge Jayu-ro Song Festival
"Wonderful Barn" (멋진헛간) with Hyukoh	2015	4	KOR: 920,194+	Infinite Challenge Yeongdong Highway Music Festival
"Today" (오늘은) with Solji, Yoo Jae-hwan	2015	32	KOR: 122,522+	Don't Worry Music Vol. 1
"Shall We Walk?" (걸을까) with Yoo Jae-hwan	2015	93	KOR: 24,177+	Don't Worry Music Vol. 2
As featured artist
"Not an Easy Girl" Lizzy feat. Jung Hyung-don	2015	38	KOR: 71,150+	Non-album single
"Spring Fever (Feat. DIN DIN, Jung Hyung-don)" (봄이라서) Choi Ye-na feat. DinDin, Jung Hyung-don	2026			LOVE CATCHER

Infinite Challenge Yeongdong Highway Music Festival

== Awards ==
Year	Awards show	Category	Nominated work	Result
2002	17th KBS Awards Comedian Contest Amateur	Statue	Jung Hyung-don	Won
2003	KBS Entertainment Awards	Best Newcomer Award – Comedy	Jung Hyung-don	Won
2003	KBS Entertainment Awards	Top Excellence Award – Idea (Corner)	Gag Concert: "Doremi"	Won
2004	KBS Entertainment Awards	Excellence Award – Comedy	Gag Concert: "Beautiful Flowers"	Won
2006	MBC Entertainment Awards	Best Program Award	Infinite Challenge (shared with cast members)	Won
2007	MBC Entertainment Awards	Best Program Award	Infinite Challenge (shared with cast members)	Won
2008	MBC Entertainment Awards	Outstanding Male Entertainer	Jung Hyung-don	Won
2008	MBC Entertainment Awards	Best Variety Show	Infinite Challenge (shared with cast members)	Won
2008	89th National Athletic Competition	Aerobic Amateur Club 6-People - 2nd place	Infinite Challenge Team (shared with cast members)	Won
2009	MBC Entertainment Awards	Best Program Award	Infinite Challenge (shared with cast members)	Won
2010	KCTA Cable TV Broadcast Awards	TV Star of the Year	Jung Hyung-don	Won
2010	5th Arena-Audi A-Awards	Top "Black Collar Workers" – Innovation	Infinite Challenge Team	Won
2011	The 53rd National Rowing Championships	2000m Novice Inn (Special Award)	Infinite Challenge Team	Won
2011	MelOn Music Awards	Trend Award	Infinite Challenge Theme – "West Coast Highway Song Festival" (shared with cast members)	Won
2013	MBC Entertainment Awards	Most Popular Program	Infinite Challenge (shared with cast members)	Won
2013	MBC Entertainment Awards	"Best Couple" Award	Jung Hyung-don (with G-Dragon)	Won
2013	MBC Entertainment Awards	High Excellence Award for Variety Shows – Male	Jung Hyung-don	Won
2014	KBS Entertainment Awards	Top Entertainer Award	Cool Kiz on the Block	Won
2014	MBC Entertainment Awards	Entertainment Program of the Year	Infinite Challenge (shared with cast members)	Won
2015	42nd Korea Broadcasting Prizes	Grand Prize	Infinite Challenge (shared with cast members)	Won
2015	51st Paeksang Arts Awards	Best Variety Performer - Male	Jung Hyung-don (for Please Take Care of My Refrigerator, Infinite Challenge)	Nominated
2015	KBS Entertainment Awards	Variety Star Award	Jung Hyung-don	Won
