= Defconn =

South Korean rapper and comedic television personality

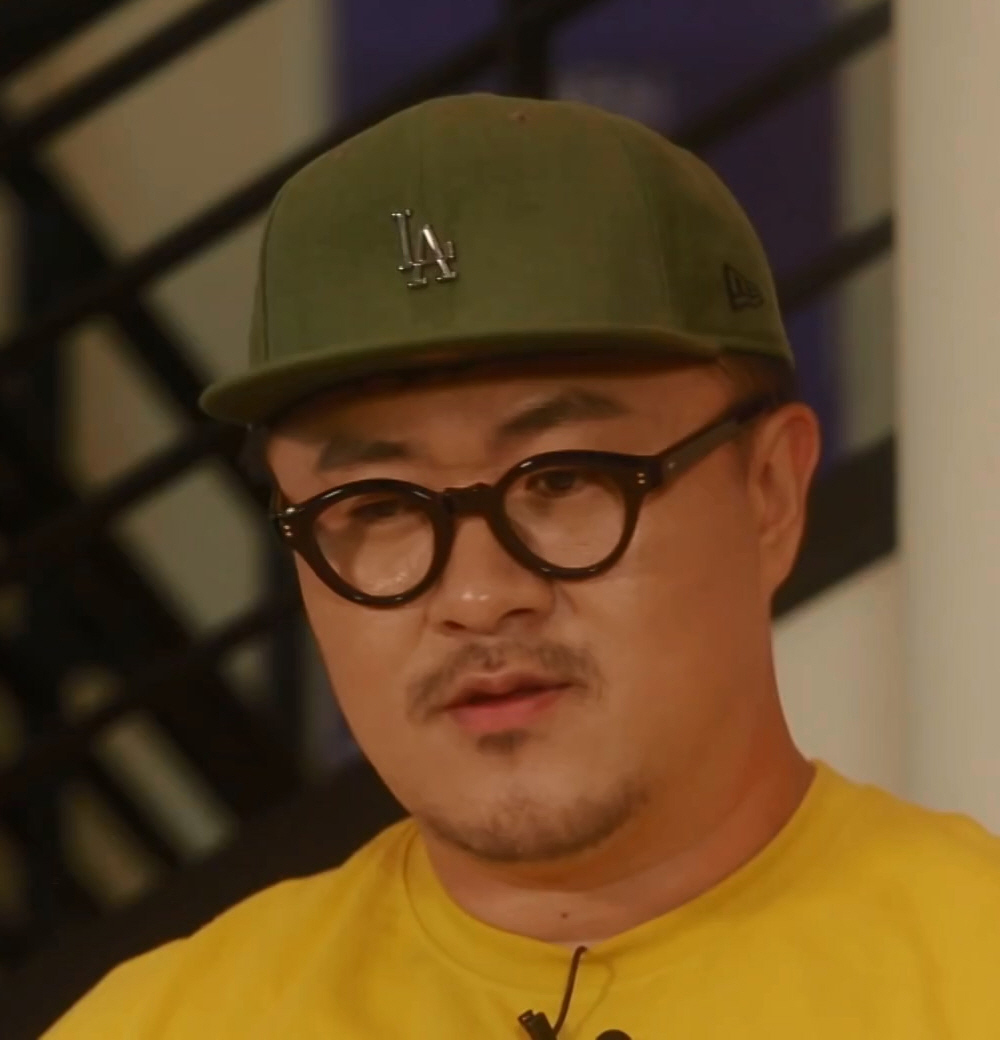
- Defconn in 2016

Background information
- Born: Yoo Dae-joon; November 17, 1976 (age 49); Jeonju, North Jeolla Province, South Korea
- Genres: Hip hop, Rap, K-pop
- Occupations: Rapper; composer; host; television personality; actor
- Instrument: Vocals
- Years active: 1998–present
- Label: SM C&C

Korean name
- Hangul: 유대준
- RR: Yu Daejun
- MR: Yu Taejun

Yoo Dae-joon (Korean: 유대준; November 17th, 1976), known by his stage name Defconn (데프콘), is a South Korean rapper and television personality.

== Biography ==
=== 2004 ===
In 2004, Defconn received the Korean Music Award for "Best Hip-Hop Album". His songs are mostly comical, sometimes involving lyrics about sexual attraction and wishing for more popularity. One song of his, though, centered on the Yangju highway incident in which two South Korean girls lost their lives to an American military tank, which sparked anti-American sentiment in South Korea at the time. He is one of the better known underground rappers in South Korea due to his parallel career as an MC.

=== 2011–present ===
In 2011, he became the host of MBC Every1's Weekly Idol alongside entertainer and comedian Jeong Hyeong-don, a show which was extended from an original six episode special to a weekly show that continues today.

In June 2012, he and Hyungdon formed a hip-hop collaboration called Hyungdon and Daejun.

Defconn is a founding member of MBC's I Live Alone, a documentary-style variety program focusing on the real lifestyles of men who live alone. The "Rainbow Club" – a self-designated nickname for the show's hosts – includes both men who are unmarried and men who live alone because their families live overseas. Defconn left the cast in July 2014, citing that he was moving in with his brother and would no longer be living alone.

In November 2013, Defconn became a cast member for the third season of KBS2's Happy Sunday segment 2 Days & 1 Night, and he remained so until 2019, when the third season ended.

== Discography ==
- Straight from the Streetz (September 2001)
- Lesscon 4 the People (May 13, 2003)
- 1 1-2 Rawyall Flush (October 16, 2003)
- 콘이 삼춘 다이어리 (November 23, 2004)
- City Life (April 13, 2006)
- Mr. Music (July 10, 2007)
- Green Tour (March 5, 2008)
- "Sugar Love" – Single (March 12, 2009)
- Macho Museum (March 16, 2010)
- "King Wang Zzang" (feat. Kim Hee-chul) – Digital single (November 20, 2010)
- "이별병" – Digital single (March 30, 2011)
- The Rage Theater (August 4, 2011)
- Gangsta Rap Volume 1 (June 2012)
- L'Homme Libre Vol. 1 (August 2013)
- I'm Not a Pigeon (April 2015)

=== As featuring artist ===
Title	Year	Peak chart positions	Sales (DL)	Album
Title	Year	KOR	Sales (DL)	Album
"Clap" Drunken Tiger with Haha, Defconn, Kim Jong-kook and G1	2018	—	—N/a	Drunken Tiger X : Rebirth of Tiger JK
"—" denotes releases that did not chart or were not released in that region.

== Filmography ==
=== TV shows ===
Variety

- Weekly Idol (2011–2018)
- 2 Days & 1 Night (2013–2019)
- Her Secret Weapon (host with Boom & Jang Su-won) (2014–2015)
- Hitmaker (with Jeong Hyeong-don) (2014–2015)
- I Live Alone (2013–2014)
- Duet Song Festival (2016–2017)
- Idol Room (with Jeong Hyeong-don) (2018–2020)
- Wanna Play? GG (2019)
- Friendly Variety Show (2020–present)
- Shutdown Fairy (2021)
- I'm SOLO (2021-present)
- Chosun Panstar (2021)
- Capitalism School (2022)
- Accapella (2022)
- I'm SOLO: Love Continues (2022-present) / Spin-off
- Star Birth (2022); Star maker
- Filthy Village (2022) - Host
- My Name is Gabriel - Panelist
- Delicious Guys (2023–present) - Cast Member
- Good Day (2025)

=== Television series ===
- A Poem a Day as Kim Dae-bang (2018)
- Hit the Top as Special Appearance (2017)
- The Wind Blows Where You Wish as Yang Goo-byeong (2015)
- Mom Is Acting Up as Special Appearance (2012)

=== Films ===
- Romantic Movement in Seoul (2010)
- The Beat Goes On (2010)

== Awards ==
Year presented, name of the award ceremony, award category, nominated work and the result of the nomination
Year	Awards show	Category	Nominated work	Result
2013	MBC Entertainment Awards	Popularity Award – Variety Shows	I Live Alone	Won
2014	KBS Entertainment Awards	Excellence Award in a Variety Show – Male	Happy Sunday: 2 Days & 1 Night	Won
2018	KBS Entertainment Awards	Top Excellence Award in a Variety Show – Male	Happy Sunday: 2 Days & 1 Night	Won
