= Jung Dong-ha =

South Korean singer (born 1980)

Jung Dong-ha 정동하
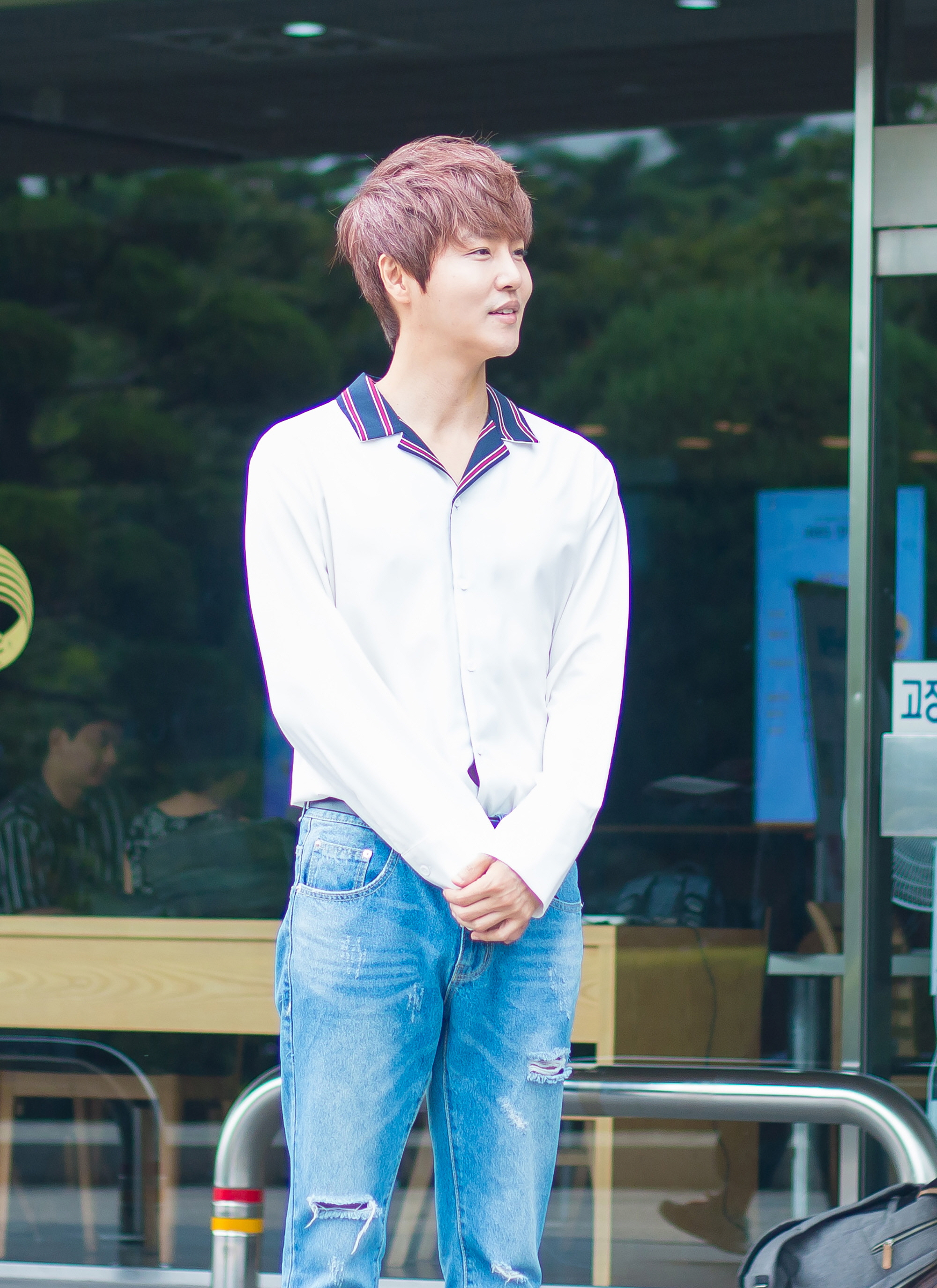
- Jung in August 2017

Background information
- Born: Jung Jae-hwan; April 17, 1980 (age 46); South Korea
- Genre: K-rock
- Occupations: Singer; radio personality; professor
- Labels: Evermore Music; Music1 Company
- Formerly of: Boohwal

- Jung Dong-ha
- Hangul: 정동하
- Hanja: 鄭東河
- RR: Jeong Dongha
- MR: Chŏng Tongha

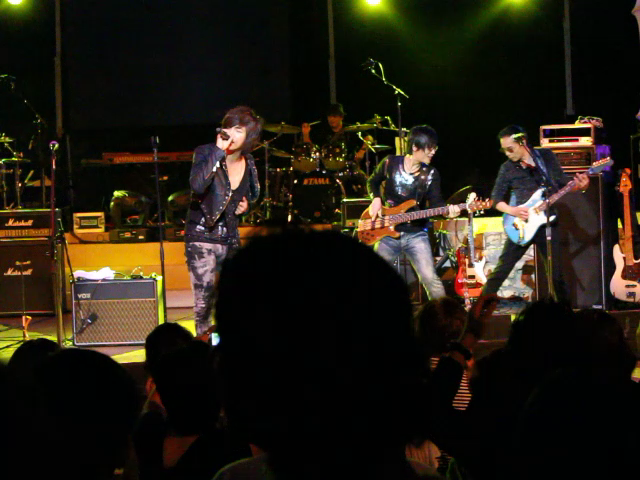
Boohwal performance at a U.S. Concert

Jung Dong-ha (born Jung Jae-hwan on April 17, 1980) is a South Korean singer, radio personality and a vocal major professor at Kyungpook National University. Jung joined as a vocalist of South Korean rock band Boohwal in 2005, after releasing three albums with Boohwal Jung left the band in 2014.

== Biography ==
=== Before debut (1980–2005) ===
==== Education ====
Jung was born in Seoul, South Korea and graduated from Kwanak High School.

==== Background ====
In high school, he was the lead vocalist of a group called Navigator. At his university, he played the vocal-guitar role in a space MHZ, and performed under the group alias Block Driver at clubs Hongik University Rollingstones, Koda, Freebird, and so on. While he was serving in the Korean Army, he had formed his own rock band. After he was discharged from military service, he worked on his music career on his own until he joined Boohwal, which is considered by many to be the living legendary rock group in South Korea. He started his professional music career since then.

==== Motivation in musicianship ====
In an interview, Jung explained that a performance of "Don't Stop Me Now", by Queen, gave such an awe-inspiring impression that it motivated him to become a musician. He explains how amazed he was to experience guitar, bass, drums, and vocal cooperate to create such an amazing sound.

==== Audition ====
After completing military service in 2004, Jung signed with a recording studio of a composer he had befriended and prepared his career further. From there he was recommended to bassist Seo Jae-hyuk and was led to Bohwal's audition. At the time the band was in search of finding a new vocalist. In a radio show Boohwal's leader Kim Tae-won talked about how, in the audition, he heard Jung Dong-ha singing "고해/Gohae/Confession", which is one of well known classic Korean pop song, and was so amazed that he picked him as the new vocal for the band on the spot.

=== After debut (2005–present) ===
==== Debut as the ninth vocalist of rock band Boowhal (2005) ====
In 2005, Jung was initiated as the ninth successor of the legacy of Boohwal vocalists. Jung's name is now listed with Boohwal vocalists Kim Jong-seo, Lee Seung-chul, Kim Jae-ki, Kim Jae-hee, Park Wan-kyu, Kim Ki-yeon, Lee Sung-wook, and Jung Dan. He started his career as a musician with his debut album Seojeong.

==== Freshman of Boohwal (2006–08) ====
In 2006, Jung's second album aka Boohwal's 11th Album Saarang was released. He participated in various drama OST's during years 2007, 2008

==== Boohwal (2009) ====
In 2009, in February, Boohwal's 25th Song Book was released. In May, Jung was featured on a song titled "Aaeburrlae" and in July, he participated in an O.S.T of Korean broadcasting station MBC's Drama Chinku, Urideuluijeonseul. In August, Boohwal's new official album 25th Anniversary: Retrospect I was released. In the new album he co-authored the lyrics of songs named "Thodashi Saarangii" and "OZ". In the O.S.T of Drama Chiku he participated in the composition of the song titled "The Day". Jung joined Korean broadcasting arts performance academy as a vocal trainer in a project called "Hyun Jin-young Go Project". The academy is instituted by the Korean broadcasting station SBS. He took his first step by performing in national tours and making appearances on various media broadcasts. Following that Jung Dong-ha along with Boohwal received the 2009 Mnet Asian Music Awards as the nominee of Best Rock Award, as well as the nominee of Korean Cultural Entertainment Award's Top 10 Singers awards criteria.

==== Marching on (2010–present) ====
In 2010, Jung's vocalist contract with Boohwal was renewed. In February, he was cast as the show host of a music program called "Live H", and started his appearance in the broadcasts. The show is co-produced by Kyung-in TV and Arirang TV. In the program Jung leads the corner named "Hidden Ace", which is a special corner for the program that is scheduled once a month. In March, 25th Anniversary: Retrospect II was released and Jung participated in the supporting album of the 2010 FIFA World Cup called The Shouts of Reds. United Korea. In April, he participated in an OST of a movie called Daehanminguk 1% with a song titled "You and I". In July, he participated in another OST of a game named ARGO with a song titled "Saessangwiiroe". He was also enrolling into the Korea Art College. After the release of the album Purple Wave, single album Geuttaegajigeumiramyeon and collaboration album Nuguhnasaaranguhlhaanda were released. The albums were compiled on the road on a nationwide South Korean tour and the collaboration album includes several former Boohwal vocalists Jung Dan, Park Wan-kyu, and Lee Sung Wook. Another single album song Ghasseumaae Keurin Suhng (Vision in Mind) and Moosa Baekdohngsuu an O.S.T. called The Only Road, alongside his first musical "New Roly Poly" was released. He was also competing in a music program named "Immortal Songs 2 – Singing the Legends" (불후의 명곡).

=== Rock band Boohwal ===
Boohwal is the name of a South Korean rock band formed in 1986. Current members of Boohwal include Kim Tae-won, Seo Jae-hyuk, Chae Jae-min and Jung Dong-ha. Jung is currently the youngest member in Boohwal, presenting as much as fifteen years of age difference. The latest official album of the band 25th Anniversary: Retrospect has two parts, released in August 2009 and March 2010, respectively.

Boohwal Entertainment stated that on January 3, 2014, Jung Dong-Ha would be parting ways with Boohwal as his contract had expired after their eight-year journey. When inquired about why Jung Dong-Ha decided to leave Boohwal even after becoming the longest running vocalist of Boohwal by You Hee-yeol in the KBS musical program You Hee-yeol's Sketchbook, Dong-Ha answered that he wanted to discover a new side of himself and his singing (which he realized after becoming a contestant of KBS's other musical program "Immortal Songs: Singing the Legend"). He further added that even Boohwal needed some fresh changes to take the band to the next level. So his parting from the band came very naturally as his contract expired.

=== Hyun Jin-young Go Project ===
Jung joined the "Hyun Jin-young Go Project" as a vocals trainer. As an academy established by a famous Korean hip hop singer-dancer-producer in 2009, the project has proclaimed to become a full-time music production session assets benefactor to those who are nominated through the project. The project's intent was to help students of music make breakthroughs to penetrate the realm of career in musicianship.

=== Like Book, Like Music: This is Jung Dong Ha ===
On August 25, 2014, Jung made his debut as a radio jockey and DJ in his own radio program called Like Book, Like Music: This is Jung Dong-Ha (책처럼 음악처럼, 정동하입니다 !; Revised Romanization: Chaekcheoreom Eumagcheoreom Jeong Dong-ha Imnida!) in Educational Broadcasting System EBS FM. This was a radio program where Jung captivated his listeners with the power of both music and his voice. The radio program aired from Monday to Saturday, 9 pm to 11 pm via online radio EBS FM 104.5 MHz and EBS Bandi. In the program, Jung listened to the concerns and views of the listeners and even invited various celebrity guests at times to discuss different aspects of life with them. He also chose his own selection of songs and plays for the listeners. The program has been immensely popular and successful, with search hits ranking number one within just a few days of broadcasting and with thousands of daily online chats and conversations about the program.

== Discography ==
=== Studio albums ===
Title	Album details	Peak chart positions	Sales
Title	Album details	KOR	Sales
Crossroad	Released: September 13, 2018; Label: Music1 Company; Formats: CD, digital download	20	KOR: 3,671

=== Extended plays ===
Title	EP details	Peak chart positions	Sales
Title	EP details	KOR	Sales
Begin	Released: October 8, 2014; Label: Evermore Music; Formats: CD, digital download	6	KOR: 4,186
Dream	Released: June 2, 2016; Label: Evermore Music; Formats: CD, digital download	17	KOR: 2,957
Life	Released: October 15, 2017; Label: Evermore Music; Formats: CD, digital download	21	KOR: 2,078
Sketch	Released: September 17, 2019; Label: Music1 Company; Formats: CD, digital download	26	KOR: 2,367

=== Singles ===
Title	Year	Peak chart positions	Album
Title	Year	KOR	Album
"If I"	2014	28	Begin
"Snow, Again" (다시, 눈)	2015	—	Non-album single
"Oh! Love" (오! 사랑)	2016	—	Dream
"Korea"	2016	—	Non-album single
"Now I Know" (사람이) (with Paul Kim)	2017	—	Life
"Your Season" (너의 계절)	2017	—	Life
"Sunshine"	2017	—	Non-album singles
"If You Love" (사랑하면)	2018	—	Non-album singles
"Let Me Go Back" (되돌려 놔줘)	2018	—	Crossroad
"It's You"	2019	—	Sketch
"Waiting to Shine" (밤이 두려워진 건)	2019	—	Sketch
"My Heart Is You" (그게 너였어)	2019	—	Sketch
"What Is Love" (이별을 노래로 만들어 보았습니다)	2019	—	Sketch
"Stay With Me" (그대 밖은 위험해)	2020	—	Non-album singles
"Love"	2020	—	Non-album singles
"Fly Away"	2020	—	Non-album singles
"I Still Love You" (추억은 만남보다 이별에 남아)	2021	40	Non-album singles
"Imagine" (너의 모습)	2021	90	Non-album singles
"Between Love and Breakup" (사랑과 이별 사이)	2021	—	Non-album singles
"The Place at the Time" (단골집)	2022	—	Non-album singles
"Women Can't Talk, Men Don't Know" (여자는 말 못하고, 남자는 모르는 것들)	2023	—	Non-album singles
"Sad Promise" (이미 슬픈 사랑)	2023	—	Non-album singles

=== Soundtrack appearances ===
Title	Year	Album
"Paradise" (파라다이스)	2006	Wolf OST
"My Love Is" (내사랑은)	2006	Great Inheritance OST
"It'll Be Great" (좋을 거야)	2008	Single Dad in Love OST
"The Day"	2009	Friend, Our Legend OST
"You and I" (with Bora of BGH4)	2010	South Korea 1% OST
"Caterpillar" (애벌레)	2012	Iron Bag Mr. Woo-Soo OST
"Just Look at You" (바라보나봐)	2012	Missing You OST
"First Button" (첫 번째 단추)	2013	When a Man Falls in Love OST
"Sad Story" (슬픈 동화)	2013	Don't Look Back: The Legend of Orpheus OST
"Mystery"	2013	Master's Sun OST
"Destiny Sonata" (운명 같은 너)	2014	You Are My Destiny OST
"Waiting On You" (안녕 그 말)	2014	The King's Face OST
"Yolo Man"	2015	Super Daddy Yeol OST
"The Day" (그날까지)	2015	D-Day OST
"To You Again"	2016	Marriage Contract OST
"Don't Leave Me Alone" (날 혼자 두지마)	2016	Hwarang: The Poet Warrior Youth OST
"It's Over You"	2018	When Time Stopped OST
"Fighter" (feat. La.Q)	2019	The Fiery Priest OST
"Take Out My Heart"	2019	Kill It OST
"Everything Passes By" (다 지나가니까)	2020	Once Again OST
"What I Want to Say to You" (너에게 하고 싶은 말)	2021	Police University OST
"Money"	2023	Payback OST
"Live in My Heart" (내 가슴에 살아)	2023	Red Balloon OST
"Rise Again"	2023	My Lovely Boxer OST

== Musical ==
Title	Role	Dates
롤리폴리 – 우리들의 청춘	영민	May–Jun 2012
요셉 어메이징 Joseph and the Amazing Technicolor Dreamcoat	요셉	Feb–Apr 2013
잭 더 리퍼	다니엘	May–Jun 2013
노트르담 드 파리	그랭구와르	Sep–Nov 2013
Dracula	Dracula	Nov 2022–Jan 2023

=== Television ===
Year	Title	Notes
2016	King of Mask Singer	Contestant as "Get Excited Eheradio", episodes 71-80

== Radio program ==
Program	Radio	Timing	First Broadcast	Status
책처럼음악처럼 ,정동하입니다/ Like Book, Like Music: This is Jung Dong-Ha	EBS FM 104.5 MHz and EBS Bandi	Monday through Saturday, 9:00 to 11:00 pm	August 25, 2014	Ongoing

== Motorsports ==
Competition	Class	정동하 Competing Round	Team	Schedule
2013 CJ 헬로모바일 슈퍼레이스 챔피언십	NEXEN N9000	1	인제오토피아 레이싱팀	May 4, 2013
2013 CJ 헬로모바일 슈퍼레이스 챔피언십	NEXEN N9000	4	인제스피디움레이싱팀	August 3, 2013
