= Happy Sunday =

South Korea television series

- Title card
- Also known as: Happy Sunday -The Return of Superman
- Genre: Reality television
- Written by: Shin Yeo-jin; An Ju-hyun; Lee Woo-jung; Kim Hyo-jin; Choi Jae-hyung; Jo Mi-hyun; Kim So-young; Lee Sun-hye; Kim Dae-ju
- Creative directors: KBS Art Vision; Digital Arts Center for Visual Arts
- Starring: Lee Dong-gook; Sam Hammington; Ko Ji-yong; Park Joo-ho
- Narrated by: Lee Won-joon (2004-11-07 – 2008-03-23); Byun Young-hee (2007-04-22 – 2008-09-09); Lee Chul-yong (2008-09-18 – 2008-11-16); Kim Shi-hyang (2008-11-23 – ?)
- Country of origin: South Korea
- Original language: Korean
- No. of episodes: 732

Production
- Executive producers: Lee Min-ho; Cho Seung-wook; Shin Won-ho; Cho Sung-sook; Shin Hyo-jung; Choi Seung-hee; Kim Yang-hwi
- Producer: Kim Young-shik
- Cinematography: Kang Chan-hee
- Editor: Kim Hyo-chan
- Camera setup: Multicamera setup
- Running time: approx. 1 hours 35 minutes (95 minutes)
- Production companies: Koen Media Corporation; Vision Productions

Original release
- Network: KBS2
- Release: November 7, 2004

Related
- 다녀오겠습니다 (KBS Joy)

Happy Sunday (Korean: 해피 선데이) is a Korean reality-variety show shown on the KBS2 network, which competes directly against MBC's Sunday Night and SBS's Good Sunday line-up. Although it has been broadcast since 2003, its line-up of shows has frequently changed, with a complete revamp occurring in Spring of 2007. At that time, three new shows were introduced – Are You Ready, High-Five, and Immortal Songs. Due to its poor reception, Are You Ready quickly evolved into 1 Night 2 Days, with most of its cast intact. In late November 2008, Happy Sunday had a revamp of its shows keeping 1 Night 2 Days as the second segment and bringing back Immortal Songs which was previously liked by viewers. However, in late March, Immortal Songs ended once again and was replaced with Qualifications of Men, making Happy Sunday an all-male cast, with a total of 14 members. In 2013, Qualifications of Men was cancelled and replaced with Star Family Show Mamma Mia. On November 3, 2013 Star Family Show Mamma Mia was moved to Wednesday nights and replaced with The Return of Superman.

Out of the three Sunday night shows, KBS's Happy Sunday, MBC's Sunday Sunday Night and SBS's Good Sunday, only KBS has kept its program as a "whole program". Both MBC and SBS has divided their Sunday night show into two parts, the first segment as one program and the second as another. Both MBC and SBS have done this to record better TV ratings, which is important in South Korean media to prove the show's popularity. The key variety programs which garner Sunday night ratings and are usually compared to one another are KBS Happy Sunday's 1 Night 2 Days, MBC Sunday Sunday Night's Real Men, and SBS Good Sunday's Running Man.

== History ==
During the 1990s KBS2's Sunday program was called Super Sunday (슈퍼선데이). But in February 1998, the name was changed to Joyful Super Sunday TV (슈퍼 TV 일요일은 즐거워). In November 2003, the name was changed again to 101% Sunday (일요일은 101%). On September 13, 2004, voice (dubbing) artist and 2003 KBS Entertainment Awards Grand Prize (Daesang) winner, Jang Jeong-jin (장정진), was recording for The Lord of the Alley (골목의 제왕) segment where he had to eat rice cakes during a game and was later hospitalized. Because of this incident, Jang died a month later (October 11, 2004) due to necrosis ("brain death") and loss of oxygenation to the brain. The segment was abolished and since November 2004, the program has been renamed Happy Sunday.

== Broadcasting times ==
- 2004–2006: 5:55 p.m. - 7:55 p.m.
- 2006–2007: 5:45 p.m. - 7:55 p.m.
- 2007–2008: 5:30 p.m. - 7:55 p.m.
- 2008–2009: 5:25 p.m. - 7:55 p.m.
- 2009–2012: 5:20 p.m. - 7:55 p.m.
- 2012–2019: 4:55 p.m. - 7:55 p.m.

== Current segments ==
=== 1 Night 2 Days Season 4 ===
- Originally aired: August 5, 2007 – March 10, 2019 and since December 2019
- Members: Kim Jong-min, Yeon Jung-hoon, Moon Se-yoon, DinDin, Na In-woo, Yoo Seon-ho
- Former members: Kim Joo-hyuk, Kang Ho-dong, Lee Soo-geun, Eun Ji-won, Lee Seung-gi, Uhm Tae-woong, MC Mong, Kim C, Ji Sang-ryul, Noh Hong-chul,
  Kim Seung-woo, Joo Won, Sung Si-kyung, Yoo Hae-jin, Jung Joon-young, Cha Tae-hyun, Kim Joon-ho, Defconn, Yoon Shi-yoon, Lee Yong-jin, Kim Seon-ho, Ravi

In the segment 1 Night 2 Days (Korean: 1박2일), the members go on an overnight trip to various places of interest in Korea. The aim of the segment is to recommend holiday destinations to its viewers. Throughout the show, there are several mini-games played to see who will eat dinner (as opposed to a simple snack), who will do the chores or work that needs to be done, and who will sleep comfortably.

The show maintains high viewership, with even same-night reruns ranking among the top 20 Sunday night programs.

=== The Return of Superman ===
- Originally aired: November 3, 2013 – present
- Cast:Sam Hammington, Park Joo-ho,
- Non-regular cast: Yang Dong-geun, In Gyo-jin, Oh Ji-ho
- Former cast: Jang Hyun-sung, Kim Jung-tae, Tablo, Song Il-gook, Uhm Tae-woong, Choo Sung-hoon, Lee Beom-soo, Ki Tae-young, Lee Hwi-jae, Bong Tae-gyu, Lee Dong-gook, Ko Ji-yong, Moon Hee Joon

In the segment The Return of Superman (Korean: 슈퍼맨이 돌아왔다), celebrity fathers spend 48 hours with their children without their mothers.

== Former segments ==
=== I'm Going To See ===
- Originally aired: 2005

=== Manners Zero ===
- Originally aired: 2006
- MC: Kim Je-dong, Choi Min-soo

=== Perfect Attendance! Let's Go To School ===
- Originally aired: 2007

=== Cool Times, Game Song ===
- Originally aired: ? – April 29, 2007
- MC: Kim Je-dong, Kang Soo-jung
- Cast: Noh Joo-hyun, Lee Kye-in, Tae Jin-ah, Park Chul, Noh Hong-chul, Yoon Jung-soo

=== Shoot-dori ===
- Originally aired:
- Coach: Jun Jin
- Assistant coach: Kim Jong-min
- Former/honorary coach: Kim Jong-kook
- Honorary Shootdori: Lee Hyun-joon
- Guest assistant coaches: Shin Jung-hwan, Tak Jae-hoon, Jo Hye-ryun, Lee Hae-young
- Supporters: Cha Tae-hyun, Lee Hyori, So Yi-hyun
- Soccer team: Ji Seung-joon, Jo Min-ho, Kim Tae-hoon, Oh Ji-woo, Lee Seung-kwon, Choi Sung-woo, Kim Tae-soo, Jin Hyun-woo

Shoot-dori (means shooting kid, ko:날아라 슛돌이 / Nal Ah Ra Shoot-dori) is a variety show where a group of kids train and practice their football skills to compete with other mini-leagues. It is still airing, however at a different time slot and is no longer a part of Happy Sunday. This program now airs on the KBS N Sports channel. It is into its fourth season with a different cast.

=== Choi Hong-man and Strong Friends ===
- Originally aired: August 13, 2006 – April 29, 2007
- MC: Lee Hwi-jae
- Cast: Choi Hong-man, Lee Soo-geun, Kim Jong-min, Chun Myung-hoon, Lee Jung, Sung Dong-il

K-1 fighter Choi Hong-man and celebrities participate in various physical challenges and games.

=== Heroine 6/Heroine 5 ===
- Originally aired: August 13, 2004 – October 29, 2006
- MC: Jee Seok-jin
- Cast: Hyun Young, Jo Hye-ryun, Jung Sun-hee, Jung Sun-kyung, Jeon Hye-bin, Lee So-yeon, Kim Jong-min, Lee Jung, Shin Jung-hwan
- Former members: Kyung-shil, Ock Joo-hyun, Kang Soo-jung, Choi Yeo-jin, Lee Hye-young
- Production Company: Hoon Media

This show has the style of a school, where male celebrity guests come and firstly try to partner with the heroines of their choice, through dance (usually) or special performances.

=== Are You Ready ===
- Originally aired: May 6, 2007 – July 29, 2007
- MC: Kang Ho-dong
- Cast: Eun Ji-won, Lee Soo-geun, Ji Sang-ryul, Noh Hong-chul, Kim Jong-min

Are You Ready was a variety show where its cast and special guests played games. The first three episodes were games that were related to the Chinese language, while the following episodes leading to its last episodes were physical and logic-based games. Due to low ratings, Are You Ready was replaced by 1 Night 2 Days with its original cast still in place.

=== High-Five/Hi-Five ===
- Originally aired: May 6, 2007 – May 18, 2008
- MC: Jee Seok-jin
- Cast: Jo Hye-ryun, Hyun Young, Park Kyung-lim, Chae Yeon, Lee Jung-min
- Former member: Kim Min-sun

Hosted by Jee Seok-jin, High-Five focuses on having its five female stars try out different jobs; over the course of the show, they have become flight attendants, farmer, stuntwomen, and police officers. Because of the stars' backgrounds, comic twists and events are often added in during training. At the show's start, comedian Jo Hye-ryun, entertainer Hyun Young, singer Chae Yeon, MC Park Kyung-lim, and actress Kim Min-sun were the High-Five stars. Due to filming commitments, Kim had to leave the show on its November 4, 2007 broadcast. She was replaced by news anchor Lee Jung-min. This show was replaced by Delicious Quiz.

=== Delicious Quiz!/A Taste Of Life ===
- Originally aired: June 1, 2008 – September 7, 2008
- MC: Hyun Young, Jo Hye-ryun, Jung Ji-young, Kim Shin-young, Boom, Lee Moo-song, Kim Soo-hyun
- Judges: Lee Byung-jin, Han Joon-hee

The first episode aired June 1, 2008 replacing High-Five, while retaining Hyun Young and Jo Hye-ryun as part of the cast. Delicious Quiz was a food-based variety show where they traveled around Korea visiting famous restaurants or places related to food. The MCs must answer quizzes related to food and get a certain number of questions correct before they are able to eat the food. The show aimed to introduce viewers to the variety of great foods available in Korea. This show was last aired on September 7, 2008 and was replaced by Schoolympic.

=== 2008 Schoolympic ===
- Originally aired: September 14, 2008 – October 26, 2008
- MC: Kang Byung-kyu, Jun Jin, Hyun Young, Boom, Yoo Chae-yeong, Lee Jong-soo, Nichkhun
- Commentators: Lee Byung-jin, Han Joon-hee

The first episode aired September 14, 2008 replacing Delicious Quiz (only Hyun Young was retained). Olympic stars compete in simple yet nostalgic games and activities on a set created to look like a classroom with celebrities as their competitors. The games will require the "athletes" to use simple school necessities like chairs, desks, mops and even buckets. Aiming to bring a more interesting and fun school environment, the show combined elements of sport and school activities with the help of sports stars and celebrities. This show was short lived and it was not replaced; instead, the 2 segments Kko Kko Tours Single♥Single and 1 Night 2 Days both extended their airtime.

=== Kko Kko Tours Single♥Single ===
- Originally aired: September 21, 2008 – November 23, 2008
- MC: Tak Jae-hoon, Shin Jung-hwan

The first episode was aired on September 21, 2008, replacing Immortal Songs. It was co-hosted by former Country Kko Kko band members Shin Jung-hwan and Tak Jae-hoon. Celebrities invite someone they're interested in and get to know them during a trip. Audiences will get to see the true, sensitive side of celebrities as they open their hearts on air. Only 2 trips was aired over a span of 10 episodes. This segment was cancelled due to high production costs and low ratings. The show was replaced with a new season of Immortal Songs which had been previously cancelled.

=== Immortal Songs ===
- Season 1 originally aired: May 6, 2008 – September 14, 2008
- Season 2 originally aired: November 30, 2008 – March 22, 2009
- MC: Tak Jae-hoon, Shin Jung-hwan, Kim Sung-eun

==== Season 1 ====
Immortal Songs (Korean: 불후의 명곡; Hanja: 不朽의 明曲; RR: Bulhu-ui Myeong-gok) was co-hosted by former Country Kko Kko partners Shin Jung-hwan and Tak Jae-hoon. Although the show initially had various co-hosts, Kim Sung-eun became the final permanent host alongside Shin and Tak. The special guest for the week is their "vocal coach", usually a famous Korean singer, although sometimes record producers and composers have appeared as the special guest. During the course of the show, the special guest's top singles (as voted by netizens) are revealed and the "students" must sing karaoke-style. At the end of the show, the best singer/student is chosen by the special guest and receives a special prize. This segment started from Kim Won-joon's episode where he brought in presents on his own accord. The show has typically showcased older singers from the past who may or may not be still active in the entertainment industry, including Lee Seung-chul and Kim Heung-gook. However they have also had episodes featuring more recent artists, including S.E.S., in recognition of their 10th anniversary since debut, as well as Sung Si-kyung just before he left for military service in July 2008. This show aired its final episode on September 14, 2008 and was replaced by Kko Kko Tours Single♥Single.

==== Season 2 ====
Happy Sunday brought back Immortal Songs with the same hosts, Shin Jung-hwan, Tak Jae-hoon and Kim Sung-eun. Its first returning episode began airing November 30, 2008, replacing Kko Kko Tours Single♥Single. Kicking off the second season, Patti Kim was the special guest. Patti Kim was the first Korean artist to be invited and perform on Japan's NHK network as well as The Johnny Carson Show in Las Vegas, United States. In season 1, Patti Kim was one of the guests that they wanted to invite on the show but was unable to. This segment was cancelled in late March 2009 and has since been replaced with Qualifications of Men.

=== Qualifications of Men ===
- Originally aired: March 29, 2009 – April 7, 2013
- Cast: Lee Kyung-kyu, Kim Gook-jin, Kim Tae-won, Lee Yoon-seok, Yoon Hyung-bin, Joo Sang-wook, Kim Jun-ho
- Former members: Kim Sung-min, Lee Jung-jin, Yang Joon-hyuk, Jun Hyun-moo

Qualifications of Men (Korean: 남자의 자격; Hanja: 男子의 資格; also known as Qualifying Men or The Qualities of a Man), replaced the second season of Immortal Songs in late March 2009. It is a show where a group of mostly middle-aged male celebrities try to complete missions (deemed to be of a quality required of a "qualifying man") given by the producer or sometimes thought of by the members.

In the first episodes, the cast joked that their primary aim was not to disturb the ratings of 1 Night 2 Days. However, the show was an unexpected success and rivaled their sister corner 1N2D in the 2009 KBS Entertainment Awards. The cast includes the main MC Lee Kyung-kyu, who made his comeback into the Korean TV industry with this show; Kim Gook-jin, a famous comedian who recently came back from attempting to become a professional golfer; Kim Tae-won, leader of the legendary rock-ballad band Boohwal; Lee Yoon-seok, a comedian known for his doctor's degree and conversely his ridiculously weak strength (though since joining the show, Kim Tae-won has virtually taken over his title of "Weakling of the nation"); Yoon Hyung-bin, a famous comedian from the show Gag Concert who frequently compares himself to Lee Jung-jin, although often to no avail; Yang Joon-hyuk, one of the greatest players in Korean baseball history and currently holds the records for home runs, RBI, and best batting average; and Jun Hyun-moo, a KBS news announcer and reporter known for his variety and comedic skills, who is rising in the entertainment world (also known for his parody of SHINee's "Lucifer" dance).

The cast has been through a variety of physically and emotionally taxing missions, usually spanning over 24 hours, performing the likes of serving mandatory military service again, crying, becoming employees of random companies, not smoking for a day, wake-boarding, singing in a choir, participating in an amusement park parade show, and forming an amateur band. The most memorable moment for the program was when 2 of the members (Kim Gook-jin and former member Kim Sung-min) was selected as a guest for the United States Air Force Thunderbirds Acrobatic Team, during their 2009 Far East Tour at Osan Air Base, in South Korea. For the Choir episodes, both of the Choir team won awards (the most recent was the 2nd Place during the KBS National Choir Contest "The Harmony", with Kim Tae-won as a conductor).

In late 2010, Kim Sung-min was dropped from the program after being arrested for meth use and smuggling. He was sentenced to 2 years and 6 months in prison, suspended for 4 years.

On April 10, 2011, Korean baseball legend Yang Joon-hyuk made his debut as a member of the show.

On May 8, 2011, Lee Jung-jin appeared in his final episode and Jun Hyun-moo became the newest and 7th member of the show.

On July 31, 2012, Yang Joon-hyuk and Jun Hyun-moo left the show, and 2 new members—actor Joo Sang-wook and Gag Concert comedian Kim Jun-ho—joined the crew.

Qualifications of Men initially maintained good ratings; in 2009, it placed second among the most viewed Sunday night programs for 16 weeks with more than 30% viewership ratings. But after four years on air, ratings dropped, until it was overtaken in popularity by MBC's Dad! Where Are We Going?, which premiered in 2013. KBS cancelled the show, and it aired its last episode on April 7, 2013. The show had begun in 2010 under the catchphrase, "101 things to do before you die", but with its cancellation four years later, the show's raison d'être was unfinished, with the program coming to a close before the cast members were able to finish filling out the list of 101 things, only getting up to #94.

=== Star Family Show Mamma Mia ===
- Originally aired: April 14, 2013 – October 27, 2013
- MC: Lee Young-ja, Park Mi-sun, Cho Kyu-hyun
- Former MC: Choi Min-ho

Star Family Show Mamma Mia (Korean: 스타 패밀리쇼 맘마미아; also known simply as Mamma Mia) is a talk show in which Korean celebrities and popular figures bring their mothers. One of the hosts, Choi Min-ho left the show after five episodes; he was replaced by Cho Kyu-hyun beginning May 19, 2013. This segment was moved to Wednesday nights. Mamma Mia was replaced with Superman Return on November 3, 2013. Then, on 18 October, 2013 Kyuhyun had announced to leave the show because of the overlap schedule with 'Radio Star' on MBC. The regular on the show and comedian, Heo Kyung-hwan will replace Kyuhyun's place as the MC of the show.

== Awards ==
Year	Award	Category	Recipient	Nominated work	Ref
2004	3rd KBS Entertainment Awards	Excellence Award, Male MC in a Variety Show	Jee Seok-jin	Happy Sunday	
2005	4th KBS Entertainment Awards	Best Entertainer Award	Kim Jong-kook	Shooting Kid	
2005	4th KBS Entertainment Awards	Excellence Idea Corner Award		I'm Going to See	
2005	4th KBS Entertainment Awards	Excellence Award, Male MC in a Variety Show	Kim Je-dong	I'm Going to See	
2006	5th KBS Entertainment Awards	Excellence Award, Female MC in a Variety Show	Hyun Young	Heroine 6	
2006	5th KBS Entertainment Awards	Best Entertainer Award	Kim Jong-min	Heroine 6	
2006	5th KBS Entertainment Awards	Top Excellence Idea Corner Award		Shooting Kid	
2007	6th KBS Entertainment Awards	Best Entertainer Award	Lee Soo-geun	1 Night 2 Days, Gag Concert "We Need Conversations"	
2007	6th KBS Entertainment Awards	Best Entertainer Award	Kim Sung-eun	Immortal Songs	
2007	6th KBS Entertainment Awards	Excellence Idea Corner Award		Immortal Songs	
2007	6th KBS Entertainment Awards	Top Excellence Idea Corner Award		1 Night 2 Days	
2007	6th KBS Entertainment Awards	Excellence Award, Male MC in a Variety Show	Jee Seok-jin	High-Five	
2007	6th KBS Entertainment Awards	Top Excellence Award, Female MC in a Variety Show	Hyun Young	Heroine 6	
2007	6th KBS Entertainment Awards	Grand Prize (Daesang)	Tak Jae-hoon	Immortal Songs	
2008	20th Korean PD Awards	Best Show Host	Kang Ho-dong	1 Night 2 Days	
2008	44th Baeksang Arts Awards	Grand Prize (Daesang) - TV category	Kang Ho-dong	Happy Sunday	
2008	15th Korea Entertainment Art Awards	Best Comedian	Lee Soo-geun	1 Night 2 Days	
2008	15th Korea Entertainment Art Awards	Best Program		1 Night 2 Days	
2008	7th KBS Entertainment Awards	Best Variety Show Writer	Lee Woo-jung	1 Night 2 Days	
2008	7th KBS Entertainment Awards	Best Newcomer in a Variety Show	Lee Soo-geun	1 Night 2 Days	
2008	7th KBS Entertainment Awards	Top Popularity Award	Lee Seung-gi	1 Night 2 Days	
2008	7th KBS Entertainment Awards	Viewer's Choice Program		Happy Sunday	
2008	7th KBS Entertainment Awards	Grand Prize (Daesang)	Kang Ho-dong	1 Night 2 Days	
2009	21st Korean PD Awards	Best Variety Show		1 Night 2 Days	
2009	8th KBS Entertainment Awards	Top Entertainer Award	Kim Sung-min; Kim Tae-won	Qualifications of Men	
2009	8th KBS Entertainment Awards	Excellence Award, Male MC in a Variety Show	Lee Soo-geun	1 Night 2 Days, Sang Sang Plus Season 2	
2009	8th KBS Entertainment Awards	Viewer's Choice Program		Happy Sunday	
2009	8th KBS Entertainment Awards	Grand Prize (Daesang)	Kang Ho-dong	1 Night 2 Days	
2010	9th KBS Entertainment Awards	Special Merit Award	Kolleen Park	Qualifications of Men	
2010	9th KBS Entertainment Awards	Top Entertainer Award	Eun Ji-won	1 Night 2 Days, Crisis No. 1	
2010	9th KBS Entertainment Awards	Excellence Award, Male MC in a Variety Show	Lee Soo-geun	1 Night 2 Days	
2010	9th KBS Entertainment Awards	Top Excellence Award, Male MC in a Variety Show	Lee Seung-gi	1 Night 2 Days	
2010	9th KBS Entertainment Awards	Viewer's Choice Program		Happy Sunday	
2010	9th KBS Entertainment Awards	Grand Prize (Daesang)	Lee Kyung-kyu	Qualifications of Men	
2011	38th Korea Broadcasting Awards	Best Entertainment TV Program		1 Night 2 Days	
2011	10th KBS Entertainment Awards	Achievement Award	Kang Chan-hee (cameraman)	1 Night 2 Days	
2011	10th KBS Entertainment Awards	Special Merit Award	Kim Tae-won	Qualifications of Men	
2011	10th KBS Entertainment Awards	Best Newcomer in a Variety Show	Yang Joon-Hyuk	Qualifications of Men	
2011	10th KBS Entertainment Awards	Top Entertainer Award	Uhm Tae-woong	1 Night 2 Days	
2011	10th KBS Entertainment Awards	Top Entertainer Award	Jun Hyun-moo	Qualifications of Men	
2011	10th KBS Entertainment Awards	Top Excellence Award, Male MC in a Variety Show	Lee Soo-geun		
2011	10th KBS Entertainment Awards	Grand Prize (Daesang)	Lee Seung-gi; Lee Su-geun; Eun Ji-won; Kim Jong-min; Uhm Tae-woong	1 Night 2 Days	
2012	11th KBS Entertainment Awards	Best Teamwork		Qualifications of Men	
2012	11th KBS Entertainment Awards	Best Variety Show Writer	Choi Jae-hyung	1 Night 2 Days	
2012	11th KBS Entertainment Awards	Best Newcomer in a Variety Show	Joo Won	1 Night 2 Days	
2012	11th KBS Entertainment Awards	Best Newcomer in a Variety Show	Joo Sang-wook	Qualifications of Men	
2012	11th KBS Entertainment Awards	Top Entertainer Award	Cha Tae-hyun	1 Night 2 Days	
2012	11th KBS Entertainment Awards	Top Excellence Award, Male MC in a Variety Show	Kim Seung-woo	1 Night 2 Days, Win Win	
2013	12th KBS Entertainment Awards	Producers' Special Award	Lee Hwi-jae	The Return of Superman	
2013	12th KBS Entertainment Awards	Top Entertainer Award (Variety)	Choo Sunghoon	The Return of Superman	
2013	12th KBS Entertainment Awards	Mobile TV Popularity Award	The children of The Return of Superman	The Return of Superman	
2013	12th KBS Entertainment Awards	Top Excellence Award (Male, Variety)	Cha Tae-hyun	2 Days & 1 Night	
2013	12th KBS Entertainment Awards	Grand Prize (Daesang)	Kim Jun-ho	Gag Concert, 2 Days & 1 Night, The Human Condition	
2014	13th KBS Entertainment Awards	Viewer's Choice Program of the Year		The Return of Superman	
2014	13th KBS Entertainment Awards	Top Excellence Award (Male, Variety)	Choo Sunghoon	The Return of Superman	
2014	13th KBS Entertainment Awards	Producers' Special Award	Lee Hwi-jae	The Return of Superman	
2014	13th KBS Entertainment Awards	Producers' Special Award	Song Il-gook	The Return of Superman	
2014	13th KBS Entertainment Awards	Best Scriptwriter Award	Kim Jung-sun	The Return of Superman	
2014	13th KBS Entertainment Awards	Excellence Award (Variety)	Defconn	2 Days & 1 Night	
2014	13th KBS Entertainment Awards	Best Newcomer Award (Variety)	Kim Joo-hyuk	2 Days & 1 Night	
2014	13th KBS Entertainment Awards	Top Entertainer Award (Variety)	Jung Joon-young	2 Days & 1 Night	
2015	14th KBS Entertainment Awards	Viewer's Choice Program of the Year		2 Days & 1 Night	
2015	14th KBS Entertainment Awards	Top Excellence Award (Variety)	Kim Jong-min	2 Days & 1 Night	
2015	14th KBS Entertainment Awards	Excellence Award (Variety)	Song Il-gook	The Return of Superman	
2015	14th KBS Entertainment Awards	Hot Issue (Variety) Award	Choo Sunghoon	The Return of Superman	
2015	14th KBS Entertainment Awards	Top Entertainer Award (Entertainment)	Lee Dong-gook	The Return of Superman	
2015	14th KBS Entertainment Awards	Top Entertainer Award (Entertainment)	Kim Joo-hyuk	2 Days & 1 Night	
2015	14th KBS Entertainment Awards	Grand Prize (Daesang)	Lee Hwi-jae	The Return of Superman, Vitamin	
2016	43rd Korean Broadcasting Grand Prize Awards	Best Variety Show		2 Days & 1 Night	
2016	15th KBS Entertainment Awards	Viewer's Choice Program of the Year		2 Days & 1 Night	
2016	15th KBS Entertainment Awards	Top Excellence Award (Variety)	Lee Dong-gook	The Return of Superman	
2016	15th KBS Entertainment Awards	Excellence Award (Variety)	Lee Beom-soo	The Return of Superman	
2016	15th KBS Entertainment Awards	Excellence Award (Variety)	Ki Tae-young	The Return of Superman	
2016	15th KBS Entertainment Awards	Best Newcomer Award	Yoon Shi-yoon	2 Days & 1 Night	
2016	15th KBS Entertainment Awards	Writer Award	Jung Sun-young	2 Days & 1 Night	
2016	15th KBS Entertainment Awards	Popularity Award	The children of The Return of Superman	The Return of Superman	
2016	15th KBS Entertainment Awards	Grand Prize (Daesang)	Kim Jong-min	2 Days & 1 Night	

== See also ==
- MBC Sunday Night
- SBS Good Sunday

Awards and achievements
Preceded by Happy Sunday	KBS Entertainment Awards for Best Program Award; 2009	Succeeded by TBD
