= Qualifications of Men =

- Also known as: Man's Qualification; Qualifying Men; The Qualities of a Man; To Be a Man; Who Is the Man; What Makes a Man
- Genre: Reality television
- Written by: Lee Woo-jung
- Directed by: Lee Hwang-seok
- Starring: Lee Kyung-kyu; Kim Gook-jin; Kim Tae-won; Lee Yoon-seok; Kim Jun-ho; Joo Sang-wook; Yoon Hyung-bin
- Country of origin: South Korea
- Original language: Korean
- No. of seasons: 1
- No. of episodes: 205

Production
- Producer: Han Kyung-cheon
- Running time: approx. 60-70 minutes
- Production companies: Hoon Media Corporation; Vision Productions

Original release
- Network: KBS2
- Release: March 29, 2009 – April 7, 2013

Related
- Happy Sunday

Qualifications of Men (Korean: 남자의 자격; RR: Namjaui jagyeok) was a Korean reality-variety show that aired on KBS2 from March 29, 2009 to April 7, 2013 as one of two segments in Happy Sunday.

Subtitled "101 Things a Man Must Do Before He Dies," the show involved a group of male celebrities of different ages and personalities who take on missions that would make them a "real man." The missions range from physical to emotional, and they meet and learn skills from many mentors in different areas.

== Cast ==
=== Former ===
- Lee Kyung-kyu (March 29, 2009 – April 7, 2013)
- Kim Gook-jin (March 29, 2009 – April 7, 2013)
- Kim Tae-won (March 29, 2009 – April 7, 2013)
- Lee Yoon-seok (March 29, 2009 – April 7, 2013)
- Yoon Hyung-bin (March 29, 2009 – April 7, 2013)
- Kim Jun-ho (July 15, 2012 – April 7, 2013)
- Joo Sang-wook (July 15, 2012 – April 7, 2013)
- Kim Sung-min (March 29, 2009 – November 28, 2010)
- Lee Jung-jin (March 29, 2009 – May 8, 2011)
- Yang Joon-hyuk (April 10, 2011 – July 8, 2012)
- Jun Hyun-moo (May 8, 2011 – July 8, 2012)

== Mentors ==
- Episode 1 – 3 (Marry twice, Anti-smoking education) : Lee Oi-soo
- Episode 4 – 5, 10 (Going to an army twice, Tears) : Nam Jin
- Episode 6 – 7 (Nursing a child) : Park Sa-rang
- Episode 12 (Debating) : Kim Sung-soo
- Episode 13 – 14 (Knowledge) : Park Jee-seon
- Episode 15 (Paragliding) : Kwon Chang-jin
- Episode 17 – 18 (Creating an UCC) : Yoo Se-yoon, 2PM
- Episode 18 – 19 (Bicycle trip) : Yoo Se-yoon
- Episode 22 (Wakeboarding) : Lee Kyung-kyu
- Episode 47, 56, 67 – 68 (Making a band) : Kim Tae-won
- Episode 63 – 65, 70 – 74 (Choir) : Kolleen Park
- Episode 93, 121, 135 (Tap dance) : Tap trainer Lee Jung-kwon

== 5 major plans ==
=== 2010 ===
- Hiking Jirisan (completed)
- Get licenses (completed)
- Backpacking (Delayed to 2011)
- Forming a Band (completed)
- Watching the World Cup (completed)

=== 2011 ===
- Backpacking (May 16 – 26, West Australia, completed)
- Having a new hobby (Tap Dancing completed)
- Creating a short film (completed)
- Samul nori (completed)
- Becoming a CEO (completed)

== History ==
As part of Happy Sunday, Qualifications of Men replaced the second season of Immortal Music Classics in late March 2009. In the early episodes, the cast joked that their primary aim was not to disturb the ratings of sister segment 2 Days & 1 Night.

The original cast included the main MC Lee Kyung-kyu, who made his comeback into the Korean TV industry with this show; Kim Gook-jin, a comedian who previously attempted to become a professional golfer; Kim Tae-won, leader of the legendary rock-ballad band Boohwal; Lee Yoon-seok, a comedian known for his doctor's degree and conversely his ridiculously weak strength (though since joining the show, Kim Tae-won took over his title of "Weakling of the nation"); Yoon Hyung-bin, a comedian from the show Gag Concert; and actors Lee Jung-jin and Kim Sung-min.

The cast went through a variety of physically and emotionally taxing missions, usually spanning over 24 hours, performing the likes of serving mandatory military service again, crying, becoming employees of random companies, not smoking for a day, wake-boarding, singing in a choir, participating in an amusement park parade show, and forming an amateur band. The most memorable moment for the program was when 2 of the members (Kim Gook-jin and Kim Sung-min) was selected as a guest for the United States Air Force Thunderbirds Acrobatic Team, during their 2009 Far East Tour at Osan Air Base, in South Korea. For the Choir episodes, both of the Choir teams won awards (with guest Kolleen Park and Kim Tae-won as conductors).

In late 2010, Kim Sung-min was dropped from the program after being arrested for drug use. He was sentenced to 2 years and 6 months in prison for meth use and smuggling, suspended for 4 years.

On April 10, 2011, Korean baseball legend Yang Joon-hyuk (he currently holds the records for home runs, RBI, and best batting average) made his debut as a member of the show.

On May 8, 2011, Lee Jung-jin appeared in his final episode and Jun Hyun-moo became the newest and 7th member of the show. Jun is a KBS news announcer and reporter known for his variety and comedic skills (particularly for his parody of SHINee's "Lucifer" dance).

On July 31, 2012, Yang Joon-hyuk and Jun Hyun-moo left the show, and 2 new members—actor Joo Sang-wook and Gag Concert comedian Kim Jun-ho—joined the crew.

Qualifications of Men initially maintained good ratings; in 2009, it placed second among the most viewed Sunday night programs for 16 weeks with more than 30% viewership ratings. But after four years on air, ratings dropped, until it was overtaken in popularity by MBC's Dad! Where Are We Going?, which premiered in 2013. KBS cancelled the show, and it aired its last episode on April 7, 2013. With its cancellation, the show's raison d'être was unfinished, with the program coming to a close before the cast members were able to finish filling out the list of 101 things, only getting up to #94.

== Broadcasting times ==
Broadcasting times

| Channel | Date | Broadcasting time | |
|---|---|---|---|
| KBS2 | March 29, 2009; October 4, 2009; February 14, 2010; June 20, 2010; February 6, 2011; March 27, 2011; April 17, 2011; May 1, 2011; June 5, 2011; June 19, 2011; July 3, 2011; July 24, 2011; August 28, 2011; September 25, 2011; October 2, 2011; October 16 – November 20, 2011; December 4 – April 7, 2013 | Sunday | 17:10 |
| KBS2 | April 5, 2009 | Sunday | 17:30 |
| KBS2 | May 16, 2010 | Sunday | 16:10 |
| KBS2 | May 30, 2010 | Sunday | 16:25 |
| KBS2 | October 24, 2010 | Sunday | 18:00 |
| KBS2 | November 21, 2010 | Sunday | 17:15 |
| KBS2 | February 27, 2011; March 6, 2011; July 10, 2011; July 31, 2011; September 4, 2011; September 11, 2011; October 9, 2011; November 27, 2011 | Sunday | 17:00 |
| KBS2 | May 8, 2011 | Sunday | 16:50 |
| KBS2 | April 12 – September 27, 2009; October 11 – February 7, 2010; February 21 – May 9, 2010; May 23, 2010; June 6, 2010; June 13, 2010; June 27 – October 17, 2010; October 31 – November 14, 2010; November 28, 2010 – January 30, 2011; February 13, 2011; February 20, 2011; March 13, 2011; March 20, 2011; April 3, 2011; April 10, 2011; April 24, 2011; May 15–29, 2011; June 12, 2011; June 26, 2011; July 17, 2011; August 7–21, 2011; September 18, 2011 | Sunday | 17:20 |

== Awards ==
| Year | Award | Category | Recipient | Ref |
|---|---|---|---|---|
| 2009 | 8th KBS Entertainment Awards | Top Entertainer Award | Kim Sung-min; Kim Tae-won | |
| 2009 | 8th KBS Entertainment Awards | Viewer's Choice Program | Happy Sunday | |
| 2010 | 1st Company Band Festival | Bronze (4th place) | Qualifications of Men | |
| 2010 | 7th Geoje National Choir Competition | Participation Award | Qualifications of Men | |
| 2010 | 47th Asia-Pacific Broadcasting Union General Assembly | Entertainment Award | Qualifications of Men | |
| 2010 | 17th Korean Entertainment Art Awards | Top Excellence Award for Variety Show | Qualifications of Men | |
| 2010 | Korea Communications Standards Commission | Program of the Month (September) | Qualifications of Men | |
| 2010 | Korea Content Awards | Minister's Award, Arts category | Qualifications of Men | |
| 2010 | 방송인상 | Special Award | Qualifications of Men | |
| 2010 | 9th KBS Entertainment Awards | Special Merit Award | Kolleen Park | |
| 2010 | 9th KBS Entertainment Awards | Viewer's Choice Program | Happy Sunday | |
| 2010 | 9th KBS Entertainment Awards | Grand Prize (Daesang) | Lee Kyung-kyu | |
| 2011 | Korean PD Awards | Best Program, TV Variety Show category | Qualifications of Men | |
| 2011 | 1st KBS National Choir Festival: The Harmony | Silver | Qualifications of Men | |
| 2011 | Korean Advertisers Association Awards | Good Program, Variety Show category | Qualifications of Men | |
| 2011 | Korea Tap Festival | Popularity Award | Qualifications of Men | |
| 2011 | Korea Communications Standards Commission | Program of the Month (October) | Qualifications of Men | |
| 2011 | 10th KBS Entertainment Awards | Special Merit Award | Kim Tae-won | |
| 2011 | 10th KBS Entertainment Awards | Best Newcomer in a Variety Show | Yang Joon-hyuk | |
| 2011 | 10th KBS Entertainment Awards | Top Entertainer Award | Jun Hyun-moo | |
| 2011 | KBS 감동대상 | Grand Prize (Daesang) | Qualifications of Men | |
| 2012 | 17th Busan Choral Festival & Competition | Silver, Pop category | Qualifications of Men | |
| 2012 | 11th KBS Entertainment Awards | Best Teamwork | Qualifications of Men | |
| 2012 | 11th KBS Entertainment Awards | Best Newcomer in a Variety Show | Joo Sang-wook | |
