= No Min-woo =

South Korean actor and musician (born 1986)

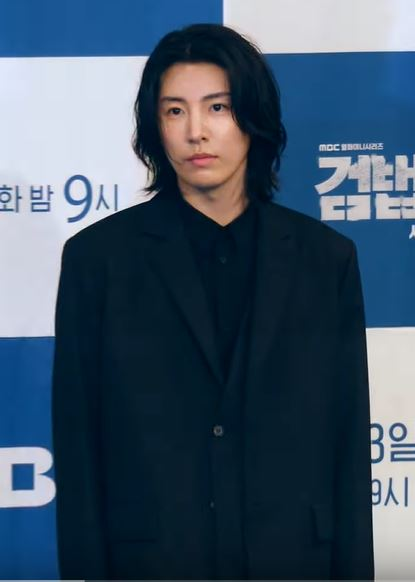
- No in June 2019
- Born: May 29, 1986 (age 40); Japan
- Occupations: Actor; musician; singer; songwriter
- Years active: 2004–present
- Agent: n.CH Entertainment
- Musical career
- Also known as: ICON; MINUE
- Instruments: Piano; guitar; drums; bass guitar; saxophone; vocals
- Years active: 2004–present
- Labels: SM; Core Contents Media; MJ Dreamsys
- Member of: The Midnight Romance
- Formerly of: TraxX; 24/7

Korean name
- Hangul: 노민우
- Hanja: 魯敏宇
- RR: No Minu
- MR: No Minu

No Min-woo (Korean: 노민우; born May 29, 1986) is a South Korean actor, musician, singer and songwriter. He is also known under the stage names ICON and MINUE. He debuted as a drummer in TRAX in 2004, and left the band two years later. In 2008, he began acting in various television series and movies, such as Pasta, My Girlfriend is a Nine-Tailed Fox and Full House Take 2, and he regularly contributes to movie and drama soundtracks. In 2013, No made a comeback as a singer under the stage name ICON. In 2016 he enlisted in the military, and returned in 2018. In 2020, he made a comeback as the lead singer and leader of the newly formed band The Midnight Romance.

== Early life ==
No Min-woo was born in Japan. His mother, then 20 years old, was aspiring to become an enka singer in Japan.

He moved back and forth between Korea and Japan for a long time, and started playing the piano at age 7.

He has a younger brother, No Jeong-hun, who is a singer under the pseudonym I'll.

== Career ==
No made his debut as the drummer (with the stage name Rose) in the rock band TraxX in 2004. Prior to debut, No appeared in "2002 Survival Audition HeeJun vs. KangTa Battle of the Century" with bandmates Typhoon and Attack, as well as Kim Junsu, Super Junior's Sungmin and Eunhyuk.

No left TraxX in 2006, and briefly became a guitarist for The Romantist before it disbanded.

In 2009, he returned to the music scene as the leader of the project group 24/7, with Lee Jang-woo and Hyun Woo. They released the single 24 Hours a Day, 7 Days a Week.

No began pursuing an acting career in 2008 and gained notice with his supporting roles in the 2010 South Korean television series Pasta and My Girlfriend is a Nine-Tailed Fox. He landed his first leading role in the four-episode drama special Rock Rock Rock, a biographical film about the life of Boohwal lead guitarist Kim Tae-won.

In 2011, for his role as a cancer patient in the SBS television series Midas, No lost 9.5 kilograms (21 pounds).

His long-delayed television series Full House Take 2 (a loose sequel to the 2004 hit) secured air dates on Japan's TBS and Korean cable channel SBS Plus in 2012. No was cast as the male lead in the Chinese television series Love Expiration Date, for which he will also serve as OST music director, composing and writing songs for the soundtrack.

In 2012 his contract with Core Contents Media came to an end, and he established his own management company, MJ Dreamsys.

In 2013, on July 1, No released his MV, ROCKSTAR, under his newly opened YouTube channel, officialminewTV.

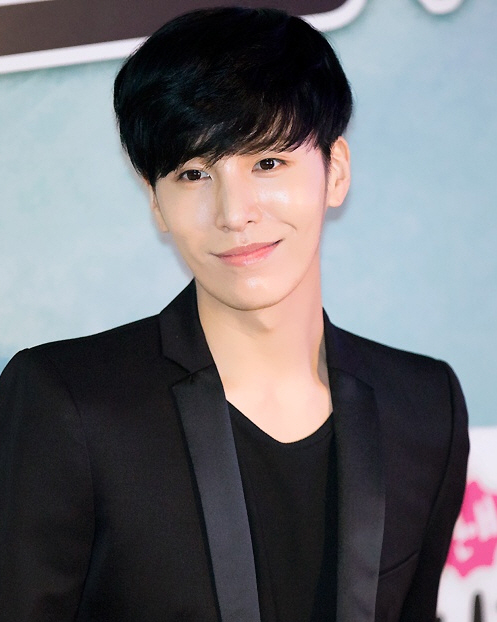
No in 2014

In 2014, No appeared in a minor role in Roaring Currents (released July 30, 2014), which became the highest-grossing film of all time in South Korea. Later in 2014, No played one of the main characters in The Greatest Marriage.

No starred in MBC Dramanet's My Unfortunate Boyfriend, which premiered on April 10, 2015.

In 2019, No played a lead role in the MBC television series Partners for Justice 2 as Jang Chul, a talented but mysterious ER doctor.

On May 17, 2020, his newly formed band The Midnight Romance (stylized in all caps) released their self-titled debut single of the same name which consisted of three songs.

On January 19, 2022 it was confirmed that No signed an exclusive contract with n.CH Entertainment.

=== Lawsuit ===
In April 2015, No filed a lawsuit against his former agency, S.M. Entertainment, as well as reported the agency to the South Korea Fair Trade Commission. Documents from the lawsuit reveal that No originally signed a 17-year exclusive contract with S.M. No sought 100 million KRW for damages resulting from the agency's interference in his career.

On July 21, 2016 No lost his damage suit against S.M as a result of insufficient evidence and the court ruled out the contract between S.M and No invalid.

In June 2018, it was reported No had lost the appeal in his lawsuit against S.M. Entertainment due to the insufficient evidence to the above stated claims.

== Mandatory military service ==
No enlisted for his mandatory military service in October 2016, and was discharged in July 2018.

== Filmography ==
=== Television drama ===
Year	Title	Role	Notes/Ref.
1997	Propose		
2001	Truth		
2008	Detective Mr. Lee	Seo Joo-Heon	
2009	Hilarious Housewives	Noh Min Woo	
2009	Mrs. Town	Jackie Jung's younger lover	
2009	Jung Yak-yong		Cameo
2010	Pasta	Philip	
2010	My Girlfriend Is a Gumiho	Park Dong-joo	
2010	Rock, Rock, Rock	Kim Tae-won	Drama Special Series
2011	Midas	Yoo Myung-joon	
2012	Full House Take 2	Lee Tae-ik	
2013	Monstar	Daniel Park	Cameo (episode 12)
2013	Love Expiration Date	Lee Ti En	
2013	The Blade and Petal	Yeon Namsaeng	
2014	God's Gift: 14 Days	Theo	
2014	The Greatest Marriage	Park Tae-yeon	
2015	My Unfortunate Boyfriend	Yoon Tae-woon	
2015	Eating Existence	Park Byeong	
2019	Partners of Justice 2	Jang Chul / Dr. K	
2022	Behind Every Star	Oh Hyeon	
2023	The Forbidden Marriage	Banju Bantan	Cameo

=== Film ===
Year	Title	Role
2008	Story of Wine	Taek-jin
2008	A Frozen Flower	Min-woo
2011	Ghastly	Cheol-Woong
2014	One Day, First Love Invaded Me	Min-Hyuk
2014	The Admiral: Roaring Currents	Haru

=== Television shows ===
Year	Title	Role	Ref.
2022	Great Seoul Invasion	Consultant	

== Theater ==
Year	English title	Korean title	Role	Ref.
2022	Elisabeth	엘리자벳	Death	

== Discography ==
- The Midnight Romance - 1st debut single of The Midnight Romance (2020)
  - Dream Baby Dream
  - Midnight Romance
  - 해줄래 (IMYT)
- Partners for Justice 2 OST (2019)
  - Dr. K
  - Poison (as composer of the track)
- Jupiter - Digital single (Under the name MINUE) (2018)
  - Intro/Motion Stop
  - Jupiter
  - Trust Me
- Gravity - Japanese Debut Single (Under the name MINUE) (2016)
  - Gravity
  - We rock
  - Believe
- My Unfortunate Boyfriend OST (2015)
  - I Love You
  - Shining Love
- ICON the 1st Single Album (2013)
  - ROCKSTAR
  - Baby
  - Hello
  - Alive
- The Greatest Marriage OST (2014)
  - Crazy Love
- God's Gift: 14 Days OST (2014)
  - Snake Eyes
  - Heaven
- Love Expiration Date OST (2013)
  - 1 Minute 1 Second
- Full House Take 2 OST (2012)
  - Touch (singer)
  - Sad Touch (singer)
  - Hello Hello (singer)
- Midas OST (2011)
  - 슬픈사랑 Seulpheun Sarang (lyricist, singer)
  - 사랑해도 되나요 Sarangaedo doinayo (composer, singer)
- My Girlfriend is a Nine-Tailed Fox OST (2010)
  - Trap
- Story of Wine OST (lyricist, music director, singer; 2009)
  - 자작나무 (Love is you)
  - Even now (Singer:Sunny)
  - Firstsnow
  - Nobody
  - Confession
  - MyPerfect Romance
  - Peaceof Melody
  - Express
- That Guy's Woman (2009)
- Rhapsody Album (2005)
- Blaze Away Album (2005)
- Paradox Album (2004)
- "Scorpio" single (2004)

== Awards and nominations ==
Year	Award	Category	Nominated work	Result	Ref.
2010	KBS Drama Awards	Best Actor in a One-Act/Special/Short Drama	Rock, Rock, Rock	Nominated	
2010	SBS Drama Awards	New Star Award	My Girlfriend Is a Gumiho	Won	
2019	World Star Entertainment Awards 2019	Hallyu Global Award 2019 (Korean Wave Global Award)	Partners for Justice 2	Won	
2019	MBC Drama Awards	Scene Stealer Award	Partners for Justice 2	Won	
2019	MBC Drama Awards	Best Couple Award with Jung Jae-young	Partners for Justice 2	Nominated	
