= The Greatest Marriage =

- Promotional poster
- Also known as: The Best Wedding; The Best Marriage; The Greatest Wedding; Love and Marriage
- Genre: Romance; Drama; Comedy
- Based on: The Greatest Marriage by Jung Yi-joon
- Written by: Go Yoon-hee
- Directed by: Oh Jong-rok
- Starring: Park Si-yeon; Bae Soo-bin; No Min-woo
- Country of origin: South Korea
- Original language: Korean
- No. of episodes: 16

Production
- Production location: Korea
- Production company: C Story

Original release
- Network: TV Chosun
- Release: September 27, 2014 - December 27, 2014

The Greatest Marriage (Korean: 최고의 결혼; RR: Choegoui gyeolhon) is a 2014 South Korean television series based on the novel of the same title by Jung Yi-joon. Starring Park Si-yeon, Bae Soo-bin and No Min-woo, it airs on TV Chosun beginning September 27, 2014.

== Synopsis ==
Cha Ki-young is a popular news anchorwoman. She is smart, capable, glamorous, nationally beloved, and ranked at the top of female college students' "women I want to emulate" lists. Ambitious and confrontational, she doesn't take well to being out-shined, particularly when it comes to her workplace rival, the station's other elite news anchor, Jo Eun-cha.

Jo Eun-cha is a dedicated and driven anchorman. After failing to get elected as an assemblyman, his goal is to return to his job as top news anchor to increase his chances of being elected the next year.

Park Tae-yeon is the only son of a leading chaebol group that owns a news corporation. He studied abroad, but goes against his father's hopes of continuing the family business when he dropped out of business school to go to a culinary school. After graduation, he becomes a reporter who covers the food and lifestyle beat.

Ki-young is dating Tae-yeon, and neither are interested in the idea of marriage. But when Ki-young accidentally becomes pregnant and Tae-yeon refuses to take responsibility, she decides to have the child out of wedlock and raise it on her own as a single mother. This crucial choice takes her from that coveted spot at the top, and she goes from headlining the 9 o'clock news on her own to being the subject of scorn and scandal. Ki-young is replaced by Kang Ha-ni as the co-anchor. Unexpectedly, Eun-cha decides to become a surrogate father to Ki-young's child.

== Cast ==
- Park Si-yeon as Cha Ki-young
- Bae Soo-bin as Jo Eun-cha
- No Min-woo as Park Tae-yeon
- Uhm Hyun-kyung as Hyun Myung-yi
- Jung Ga-yeon as Na Yeon-hee
- Song Young-kyu as Choi Il-joong
- Park Hye-jin as Jung Soon-young
- Park Ji-il as Seo Hoi-pyung
- Kim Jin-ho as Ahn Jong-rak
- Kim Seung-hoon as Kim Ho-nam
- Jo Eun-ji as Park Seon-nyeo
- Jang Ki-yong as Bae Deu-ro
- Lee Jung-gil as Park Kang-rok
- Yoon Mi-ra as Jeon Ryeo-ja
- Heo Joon-seok as Kim Joon-young
- Park So-jin as Lee Yuri
- Lee Young-lan
- Jung Se-hyung
- Choi Jae-sub
- Son Se-bin as Kang Ha-ni

== International broadcast ==
- Vietnam - TV STAR SCTV11 – 01/01/2016
