= Hyun Young =

South Korean entertainer (born 1976)

- Born: Yoo Hyun-young; September 6, 1976 (age 50); Suwon, South Korea
- Education: Yong In University – Environmental Health Sciences; Korea University – Master's degree in Journalism and Mass Communication
- Occupations: Model; presenter; actress; singer
- Years active: 1997–present
- Agent: BomNal Entertainment
- Spouse: Choi Won-hee (m. 2012)
- Children: 1
- Awards: 2008 Seoul City Mayor Prize; 2006 Best Female Star Award; 1997 Super Elite Model Contest

Korean name
- Hangul: 유현영
- RR: Yu Hyeonyeong
- MR: Yu Hyŏnyŏng

Hyun Young (Korean: 현영; born September 6, 1976), born Yoo Hyun-young (유현영), is a South Korean entertainer. She has worked as a model, TV show host, actress, singer, instructor for Public relations and Personal Financial Planning at colleges, companies. Educated at Yong In University and Korea University, she is known for her unusual, almost cartoon-like voice.

== Career ==
=== Television ===
Hyun Young appears in numerous Korean television shows, and was mainstay on KBS's variety show, Heroine 6, since 2005 until the show's final episode in 2007. Since 2007, she has acted as one of the team leaders for the variety show Jiwhaza! ("Burst! Mental concentration"), airing on SBS. She is also one of the main 5 stars on KBS's High-Five, part of its Happy Sunday line-up. She was also part of Introducing a Star's Friend as a presenter.

=== Music ===
Hyun Young has recorded the Korean version of "Dragostea din tei" (otherwise known as the Numa Numa song), titled "Nuna's Dream" ("누나의 꿈"); the "Numa Numa" lyrics are changed to "Nuna Nuna" (the Korean term used by males for an older woman) in 2006. The album did not achieve great sales, nor was the song officially promoted and sung on the music charts. Her video for the single became the most watched music video in 2006, according to M.net. In May 2007, Hyun Young released her second single "Love Revolution" ("연애 혁명"), a cover of Morning Musume's "Renai Revolution 21".

== Personal life ==
Hyun Young married Choi Won-hee at the Sheraton Grande Walkerhill Hotel on March 3, 2012; her husband works at a multi-national financial firm. She gave birth to their first child on August 16, 2012.

During a 2013 investigation into propofol abuse among celebrities, Hyun Young admitted to getting doctor-prescribed injections 42 times between February and December 2011. She was not indicted, and was instead ordered to pay an ₩8 million fine.

== Philanthropy ==
On February 10, 2023, Hyunyoung donated ₩10 million to help 2023 Turkey–Syria earthquake, by donating money through Hope Bridge National Disaster Relief Association.

== Filmography ==
=== Films ===
- 2003 – First Amendment
- 2004 – Father and Son: The Story of Mencius
- 2004 – A Moment to Remember
- 2005 – Marrying the Mafia II (cameo)
- 2005 – Princess Aurora
- 2005 – The Art of Seduction
- 2006 – The Legend of Seven Cutter
- 2006 – Now and Forever (cameo)
- 2006 – Aachi & Ssipak (voice)
- 2006 – My Wife Is a Gangster 3
- 2007 – The Perfect Couple
- 2009 – Fortune Salon
- 2011 – Marrying the Mafia IV: Unstoppable Family
- 2022 – Jajangmyeon Thank you as Kim Hye-jin
- 2023 – One Day Again as Yuri (Independent film)

=== Television dramas ===
- 1997 – SBS Wind's Love
- 2003 – SBS Fairy and Swindler
- 2005 – SBS Hello My Teacher
- 2005 – SBS Fashion 70s
- 2005 – MBC Hello Franceska 3
- 2005 – MBC The Secret Lovers
- 2006 – SBS Bad Family
- 2010 – SBS OB & GY
- 2011 – KBS2 Baby Faced Beauty
- 2011 – SBS Living in Style (cameo)
- 2015 – KBS2 The Producers (cameo)

=== Variety show ===
- 1997 – SBS 이주일 투나잇 쇼 (Week Tonight Show)
- 2002 – MBC 여자를 말한다 (A Woman Says)
- 2005 – 여러분! 고맙습니다 (Your Thanks)
- 2005 – KBS 해피 선데이: 여걸 식스 (Happy Sunday: Heroine 6)
- 2005 – KBS 쇼 파워 비디오 (Show Power Video)
- 2006 – MBC 섹션 TV 연예 통신 (Section TV)
- 2006 – SBS 헤이헤이헤이 2 (Hey Hey Hey 2)
- 2006 – SBS 슈퍼 아이 (Super Eye)
- 2007 – KBS 하이-파이브 (High-Five)
- 2008 – KBS 이 맛에 산다 (Delicious Quiz: A Taste of Life)
- 2011 – SBS Running Man (Episode 31)
- 2020 – MBC King of Mask Singer (Episodes 275–276)
- 2022 - JTBC Knowing Bros (Episode 313)

== Discography ==
=== Singles ===
- March 9, 2006 – "Nuna's Dream" ("누나의 꿈")
- May 2007 – "Love Revolution" ("연애 혁명")

=== Albums ===
- April 28, 2006 – Hyun Young's Gayo Remix : Best of Club Gayo Hits

== Bibliography ==
- Smart Financial Habit (Korean: 현영 언니가 들려 주는 똑똑한 경제 습관)
  Published in October 2008, ISBN 978-89-352-0765-7
- Diary of Financial Technology (Korean: 현영의 재테크 다이어리 : 재테크 전문가도 깜짝 놀란 현영의 재테크 비법)
  Published in May 2008, ISBN 978-89-352-0742-8

== Awards and nominations ==
Name of the award ceremony, year presented, category, nominee of the award, and the result of the nomination
Award ceremony	Year	Category	Nominee / Work	Result	Ref.
Indo Global Film Festival	2022	Best Supporting Actor	Jajangmyeon Thank you	Won	
Luis Bunuel Memorial Awards	2022	Best Supporting Actress	Jajangmyeon Thank you	Won	
