= What's for Dinner? (South Korean TV series) =

Television series

- Promotional poster
- Also known as: Give Me Food; Serve Me
- Genre: Romance; Family
- Directed by: Lee Dae-young; Lee Sang-yeop
- Starring: Ha Hee-ra; Kim Hye-sun; Oh Yoon-ah; Kim Sung-min; Kim Byung-se; Ha Seok-jin
- Country of origin: South Korea
- Original language: Korean
- No. of episodes: 106

Original release
- Network: Munhwa Broadcasting Corporation
- Release: May 25 – October 23, 2009

What's for Dinner? (Korean: 밥줘!; RR: Bapjwo!; also known as Serve Me or Give Me Food) is a South Korean television series that aired on MBC in 2009.

== Cast ==
=== Main cast ===
- Ha Hee-ra as Jo Young-ran
- Kim Hye-sun as Jo Young-shim
- Oh Yoon-ah as Jo Young-mi
- Kim Sung-min as Jung Sun-woo
- Kim Byung-se as Bae Do-suk
- Ha Seok-jin as Kim Yoon-soo

=== Extended cast ===
- Lee Hye-sook as Yoon Mi-hee
- Lee Hyo-choon as Park Soon-ja
- Han In-soo as Hwang Jong-gap
- Choi Soo-rin as Cha Hwa-jin
- Ha Seung-ri as Jung Eun-ji
- Lee Byung-joon as Jo Hyun-tae
- Kwon Oh-min as Bae Woong
- Hong Soo-min as Im Jung-hee
- Kim Young-ki as Kang Hyung-sa
- Cho Yeon-woo as Yoo Joon-hee
- Lee Hyun-woo as Tommy

== See also ==
- List of South Korean television series

== International broadcast ==
- It aired in Vietnam on VTV3 channel from November 18, 2009, called: Tối nay ăn gì?
