= My Unfortunate Boyfriend =

2015 South Korean television series

- Promotional poster
- Hangul: 나의 유감스러운 남자친구
- Hanja: 나의 遺憾스러운 男子親舊
- RR: Naui yugamseureoun namja chingu
- MR: Naŭi yugamsŭrŏun namja ch'in'gu
- Genre: Romance; Comedy; Drama
- Written by: Lee Jae-yoon
- Directed by: Nam Ki-hoon
- Starring: Yang Jin-sung; No Min-woo; Yoon Hak; Han Hye-rin
- Country of origin: South Korea
- Original language: Korean
- No. of episodes: 16

Production
- Production location: Korea
- Running time: 60 minutes Fridays and Saturdays at 20:00 (KST)
- Production company: NK Company

Original release
- Network: MBC Dramanet
- Release: April 10 – May 30, 2015

My Unfortunate Boyfriend (Korean: 나의 유감스러운 남자친구) is a 2015 South Korean television series starring Yang Jin-sung, No Min-woo, Yoon Hak and Han Hye-rin. It aired on MBC Dramanet on Fridays and Saturdays at 20:00 (UTC) for 16 episodes from April 10, 2015, to May 30, 2015.

== Cast ==
=== Main characters ===
- Yang Jin-sung as Yoo Ji-na
- No Min-woo as Yoon Tae-woon
  - Jeon Jin-seo as young Yoo Tae-woon
- Yoon-hak as Kang Hee-chul
- Han Hye-rin as Jung Hye-mi

=== Supporting characters ===
- Yoon Joo-sang as Boss Yoon
- Kil Yong-woo as Hye-mi's father
- Ahn Eun-jung as Soo-ji
- Lee Yong-joo as Man-soo
- Park Jin-joo as Mal-sook
- Kim Jin-geun as Ji-na's father
- Kim Hye-sun as Ji-na's mother
- Cha Joo-young as Cha Ju-young
- Kim Dong-hee as Hong Jang-pyung
- Lee Sang-gu as Secretary Wang
- Heo Jae-ho as Choi Ki-nam
- Kim Do-yeon as Oh Mi-ran
- Kim Hee-won as Woman from Cheongju
- Kim Eun-jung as Julia
- Ahn Ah-young as Geum Ah-young
