= Supernova discography =

- Studio albums: 10
- Extended plays: 1
- Soundtrack albums: 2
- Live albums: 1
- Compilation albums: 6
- Singles: 33
- Video albums: 19
- Music videos: 30

The following is the discography of the South Korean boy band Supernova which consists of ten studio albums, one live album, six compilation albums, one extended play, and thirty-three singles. Known as Choshinsei for their Japanese releases, the group debuted in 2007 with the single "Hit" from their album The Beautiful Stardust in South Korea.

== Albums ==
=== Studio albums ===
Title	Album details	Peak chart positions		Sales
Title	Album details	KOR	JPN	Sales
Korean
The Beautiful Stardust	Released: October 25, 2007; Label: Mnet Media; Format: CD, digital download	— (Note: Under the Recording Industry Association of Korea (RIAK), The Beautiful Stardust debuted and peaked at number 7 on the monthly chart of October 2007.)	—	KOR: 15,677
Japanese
Hana	Released: October 21, 2009; Label: Universal Japan; Format: CD, digital download	—	23	
Six Stars (★★★★★★)	Released: March 3, 2010; Label: Universal Japan; Format: CD, digital download	—	25	
Hop Step Jumping!	Released: September 22, 2010; Label: Universal Japan; Format: CD, digital download	—	13	
4U	Released: October 12, 2011; Label: Universal Japan; Format: CD, digital download	—	3	JPN: 27,110
Go For It!	Released: September 19, 2012; Label: Universal Japan; Format: CD, digital download	—	8	JPN: 28,259
Six	Released: December 3, 2013; Label: Universal Japan; Format: CD, digital download	—	2	JPN: 47,996
7iro	Released: September 9, 2015; Label: Universal Japan; Format: CD+DVD, digital download	—	3	JPN: 26,511
Paparazzi	Released: August 28, 2019; Label: SV; Format: CD, digital download	—	8	JPN: 9,590
Cloud Nine	Released: September 22, 2021; Label: Nippon Columbia; Format: CD, digital download	—	14	JPN: 5,135
"—" denotes releases that did not chart or were not released in that region.

=== Live albums ===
Title	Album details	Peak chart positions
Title	Album details	JPN
Japanese
Choshinsei Live Movie in 3D "Choshinsei Show 2010" Original Soundtrack	Released: April 6, 2011; Label: Universal Japan; Format: CD, digital download	46

=== Compilation albums ===
Title	Album details	Peak chart positions		Sales
Title	Album details	KOR	JPN	Sales
Japanese
Supernova Best	Released: January 26, 2011; Label: Universal Japan; Format: CD, digital download	—	7	
Supernova Collections	Released: December 19, 2012; Label: Universal Japan; Format: CD, digital download	—	15	JPN: 5,115
5 Years Best -Beat-	Released: April 30, 2014; Label: Universal Japan; Format: CD+DVD, digital download	—	8	
5 Years Best -Ballad-	Released: April 30, 2014; Label: Universal Japan; Format: CD+DVD, digital download	—	9	
All Time Best☆2009-2011	Released: May 18, 2016; Label: Universal Japan; Format: CD+DVD, digital download	—	42	
All Time Best☆2012-2016	Released: May 18, 2016; Label: Universal Japan; Format: CD+DVD, digital download	—	41	
"—" denotes releases that did not chart or were not released in that region.

== Extended plays ==
Title	Details	Peak chart positions		Sales
Title	Details	KOR	JPN	Sales
Korean
Time to Shine	Released: August 18, 2010 (KOR), December 22, 2010 (JPN) (Note: Titled as Time To Shine -Japan Special Edition-); Label: Maru Entertainment; Format: CD, digital download	1	46	KOR: 22,411

== Singles ==
Title	Year	Peak chart positions		Sales and certifications	Album
Title	Year	KOR	JPN	Sales and certifications	Album
Korean
"Hit"	2007	—	—		The Beautiful Stardust
"Where Are You?"	2007	—	—		The Beautiful Stardust
"Goodbye"	2007	—	—		The Beautiful Stardust
"Superstar"	2008	—	—		2008 YeonGa Choshinsung (single)
"T.T.L (Time To Love)" (with T-ara)	2009	168	—		Absolute First Album
"T.T.L Listen 2" (with T-ara)	2009	—	—		Absolute First Album
"On Days That I Missed You"	2010	61	—		Time To Shine
"Stupid Love"	2012	64	—		Stupid Love (single)
"She's Gone" (폭풍속으로)	2012	81	—		She's Gone (single)
Japanese
"Kimidake Wo Zutto" (キミだけをずっと)	2009	—	7		Hana
"Hikari" (ヒカリ)	2009	—	15		Hana
"Superstar～Reborn～"	2009	—	13		Hana
"Last Kiss"	2010	—	9		Six Stars
"Magokoro" (まごころ)	2010	—	9		Hop Step Jumping!
"All About You"	2010	—	11		Hop Step Jumping!
"J.P.~Reborn~"	2010	—	13		Hop Step Jumping!
"Evidence of Luv / Get Wild"	2010	—	7	JPN: 11,132	Hop Step Jumping!
"Ai Kotoba" (愛言葉)	2010	—	9		Hop Step Jumping!
"Shining☆Star"	2010	—	7		4U
"Kuriunnare -Kimi ni Aitakute-" (クリウンナレ -キミに会いたくて-)	2011	—	2	JPN: 53,657	4U
"Kimidake Wa Hanasanai" (君だけは離さない)	2011	—	3	JPN: 35,518	4U
"Meki☆Love" (メキ☆ラブ)	2011	—	6	JPN: 21,113	4U
"Stupid Love / Come Back To Me"	2012	—	10		Go For It!
"She's Gone"	2012	—	6		Go For It!
"Da-ki-shi-me-ta-i" (抱・き・し・め・た・い)	2013	—	3	JPN: 47,352	Six
"Winner"	2013	—	3	JPN: 104,361 (Gold)	Six
"Kitto" (きっと)	2015	—	4	JPN: 54,208	7iro
"Blowin'"	2015	—	—		7iro
"Girl Friend"	2015	—	—		7iro
"Chocolate"	2015	—	—		7iro
"Love & Peace"	2015	—	—		7iro
"Matakimito..."	2016	—	3	JPN: 48,166	Non-album single
"Chapter II"	2018	—	3	JPN: 31,605	Non-album single
"—" denotes releases that did not chart or were not released in that region.

== Soundtrack appearances ==
Title	Year	Album
"No Matter What Other Say" (누가 뭐래도)	2010	Jungle Fish Season 2 OST
"The Day of Separation" (이별하는 날)	2011	Sign OST

== Videography ==
=== Video albums ===
Title	Album details	Peak chart positions		Sales
Title	Album details	JPN DVD	JPN Blu-ray	Sales
Japanese
Choshinsei Fes. Vol.1 Six Shooting Star ~Special~	Released: June 3, 2009; Label: Universal Japan; Format: DVD	40	—	
Choshinsei Limited DVD Box ~Japan Debut Year Special~	Released: December 16, 2009; Label: Universal Japan; Format: DVD	105	—	
Choshinsei 1st Live Tour ~Kimi Dake Wo Zutto~	Released: January 20, 2010; Label: Universal Japan; Format: DVD	56	—	
Choshinsei 1st Fan Meeting ~First Love~	Released: March 3, 2010; Label: Independent; Format: DVD	—	—	
Choshinsei X'Mas Tour	Released: July 28, 2010; Label: Jakol; Format: DVD	73	—	
Choshinsei Six Stars With You	Released: September 26, 2010; Label: Jakol; Format: DVD	63	—	
Choshinsei X'Mas Tour 2009	Released: October 6, 2010; Label: Universal Music; Format: DVD	78	—	
Choshinsei Tour 2010 Jumping!	Released: December 22, 2010; Label: Universal Japan; Format: DVD	56	—	
2010 Special Concert in Yokohama	Released: May 18, 2011; Label: Universal Music; Format: DVD	16	—	
Choshinsei Live Movie "Choshinsei Show 2010"	Released: June 15, 2011; Label: Universal Japan; Format: DVD	3	—	
Live Tour 2011 "Pray"	Released: December 14, 2011; Label: Jakol; Format: DVD	21	—	
Live Tour 2011 "Make It" at Tokyo International Forum	Released: December 14, 2011; Label: Jakol; Format: DVD	5	—	
Fan Meeting 2011 "For You" Concert DVD	Released: April 11, 2012; Label: KBS Media; Format: DVD	1	—	JPN: 9,070
Six Stars Best Clips 2009-2011	Released: June 27, 2012; Label: Universal Japan; Format: DVD	10	—	
Fantastic Choshinsei 24/7	Released: September 26, 2013; Label: SPO Entertainment; Format: DVD, Blu-ray	14	38	
Choshinsei Live Tour 2013 "Da-ki-shi-me-ta-i"	Released: March 26, 2014; Label: Universal Music; Format: DVD	18	—	
Choshinsei Live Tour 2013 "Party" Special Edition	Released: May 28, 2014; Label: Universal Music; Format: DVD	4	—	
5 Years Complete Clips and More	Released: June 25, 2014; Label: Universal Music; Format: DVD, Blu-ray	23	49	
Choshinsei Live Tour 2014 Fantastic Heroes in Budokan	Released: May 20, 2015; Label: Warner Music Japan; Format: DVD	5	—	
"—" denotes releases that did not chart or were not released in that region.

=== Music videos ===
List of music videos, showing year released and director
Title	Year	Director(s)
Korean
"Hit"	2007	Cha Eun-taek
"Goodbye"	2007	Cha Eun-taek
"Superstar"	2008	Unknown
"T.T.L (Time To Love)"	2009	Unknown
"T.T.L Listen 2"	2009	Unknown
"On Days That I Missed You"	2010	Cha Eun-taek
"No Matter What Other Say"	2010	Unknown
"The Day of Separation"	2011	Unknown
"Stupid Love"	2012	Hyun Young-sung
"She's Gone"	2012	Unknown
Japanese
"Kimidake Wo Zutto"	2009	Miho Kinomura
"Hikari"	2009	Miho Kinomura
"Superstar～Reborn～"	2009	Miho Kinomura
"Last Kiss"	2010	Toshiro Sonoda
"Magokoro"	2010	Toshiro Sonoda
"All About U"	2010	Toshiro Sonoda
"Evidence of Luv"	2010	Toshiro Sonoda
"Get Wild"	2010	Toshiro Sonoda
"Ai Kotoba"	2010	Toshiro Sonoda
"Shining☆Star"	2010	Park Ji-ho
"Kuriunnare -Kimi ni Aitakute-"	2011	Toshiro Sonoda
"Meki☆Love"	2011	Toshiro Sonoda
"Stupid Love"	2012	Sung Hyun-young
"She's Gone"	2012	Kim Chul
"Okaeri."	2013	Toshiro Sonoda
"Winner"	2013	Kim Chul
"Beautiful"	2014	Toshiro Sonoda
"Everything"	2014	Toshiro Sonoda
"Kitto"	2015	Toshiro Sonoda
"Blowin'"	2015	Toshiro Sonoda
"Matakimito..."	2016	Toshiro Sonoda
"Chapter II"	2018	Unknown
