= Supernova (South Korean group) =

South Korean boy band

- Also known as: Choshinsung; Choshinsei
- Origin: South Korea
- Genres: K-pop; J-pop
- Years active: 2007–2022 (Note: Indefinite hiatus)
- Labels: SV Records; Maroo Entertainment; Universal J; Mnet Media
- Members: Jung Yunhak; Kim Sungje; Kim Kwangsu; Song Jihyuk; Park Geon-il
- Past members: Yoon Sungmo
- Website: supernova-sv.com

Supernova

Chinese name
- Chinese: 超新星
Transcriptions
Standard Mandarin
- Hanyu Pinyin: Chāoxīnxīng

Korean name
- Hangul: 초신성
- Hanja: 超新星
Transcriptions
- Revised Romanization: Chosinseong
- McCune–Reischauer: Ch'osinsŏng

Japanese name
- Kanji: 超新星
Transcriptions
- Revised Hepburn: Chōshinsei

Supernova (Korean: 슈퍼노바; stylized as SUPERNOVA) is a South Korean boy band formed under Mnet Media in 2006. Their most well-known lineup featured Jung Yunhak, Kim Sungje, Kim Kwangsoo, Yoon Sungmo, Song Jihyuk and Park Geonil. The six members specialized in the areas of singing, dance, acting, rap and pop. Supernova officially debuted on September 21, 2007, with their lead single "Hit" from debut album The Beautiful Stardust.

From 2007 to 2018 they were known in Korean as Choshinsung (Korean: 초신성; RR: Chosinseong; MR: Ch'osinsŏng) and in Japanese as Choshinsei (超新星, Chōshinsei); starting in 2018 they are now known everywhere by the English name, written in all caps Latin script.

== History ==
=== Formation ===
Before it became Supernova, it was a 5-member group named GM5. The group composed of Park Geonil, Kim Sung Je, Kim Gwangsu, Song Jihyuk, Han Ji Hoo. In December 2006, there were changes in the lineup; Ji Hoo was removed from the group and replaced by Jung Yoonhak and Kim Jinchul (Jinon of F.Cuz). They performed in the BIG4 Concert as GM6. In December 2006, Kim Jinchul was removed from the group and replaced by an older trainee, Yoon Sungmo.

=== 2007–2009: Debut ===
Supernova made their official debut stage by performing "Hit" on the music program Music Bank on September 21. Supernova released their debut album The Beautiful Stardust on September 25, 2007, with title track "Hit".

On 24 July 2008, the group visited Thailand for the first time, participating in showcases and other events.

On September 14, 2009, Supernova collaborated with T-ara to release a digital single, "T.T.L. (Time to Love)", a hip-hop song with electronic sounds. Among the members, only GeonIl, Kwang Soo and JiHyuk, together with T-ara's SoYeon, Hyomin, EunJung and Jiyeon were involved in this project. During the month of September, the seven of them actively promoted the song on the various music shows. A remix version of the song, "T.T.L. Listen 2", was released on October 9, with the MV featuring all the members from both groups. Even though the rest of the members (from both groups) did not have active parts in the remix version, all 12 participated in the song promotions from October onwards.

Supernova made their Japanese debut in September 2009 with three singles released over three consecutive weeks: "Kimi dake o Zutto", "Hikari", and "Superstar (Reborn)". The first two singles are new releases, while "Superstar (Reborn)" is a Japanese remix of their Korean single "Superstar". They released their first Japanese album, titled Hana, on October 21.

=== 2010–2012: Time to Shine, Stupid Love and She's Gone ===
Supernova released their fourth Japanese single, "Last Kiss", in January 2010. The single's b-side "Ai Uta" (愛唄) is a cover of Japanese hip-hop group, GReeeeN's song of the same name. Supernova's first mini-album Time to Shine was released on August 17 and the music video for the title track was "On Days That I Missed You". A day later, Supernova also released their fifth Japanese single "Shining Star". They held their "Choshinsei Show 2010" in Yokohama Arena on December 21, 2010, with around 13000 fans attended the concert.

In late 2010, five members (except Yoonhak as he was busy filming Love Kimchi) filmed their part for SBS new medical drama Sign. Geonil played "Seo Yoonhyung", leader of popular group, "Voice" who was murdered during the group concert.

In early 2011, each member was focusing on more on individual activities in both Korea and Japan. Sungje was cast in I Really Really Like You with T-ara's Boram. Kwangsoo was cast on Real School sitcom with U-Kiss's Dongho, Kiseop and Eli. Following Sungje, Sungmo was cast in the Coronation Ball musical. Leader Yoonhak made himself busy by preparing for his Japanese drama, Love Kimchi, which was broadcast for NHK's 70th Anniversary. He was also cast in a musical titled Finding Kim Jongwook in Korea. Kwangsoo and Sungmo were both chosen as "K-Pop Zone" MC broadcast by MNet Japan. Jihyuk is also cast in the drama "Bachelor's Vegetable Store" as Yoon Ho-jae.

In October 2011, Yunhak announced temporarily leave for military service. During military service, Yunhak release his first Japanese single "Again" on March 21, 2012. on April 17, 2012, Supernova released their mini album Stupid Love, after a long break from promoting in Korea.

On August 6, Supernova release their single album She's Gone. They made their official comeback in M! Countdown on August 9. When the promotion, Sungje took painkillers to endure the pain he acquired through an ankle injury. On December 19, Supernova released collection album Supernova Collection, which contains 2 discs. The first disc is a compilation of songs from their previous albums and disc two contain 6 solo songs.

=== 2013–2015: Japanese promotions and Funky Galaxy ===
In July 2013, Maroo Entertainment announced that Yunhak would re-join Supernova for Japanese promotion. Supernova's sixth Japanese album Six" was released on December 3, 2013.

Yunhak's second Japanese single "I Love All of You" was released on January 29, 2014, followed by his first Japanese solo album Starting Over on February 19. In August, Sungje announced a temporary break for military service.

Supernova released their 18th Japanese single "Kitto" on March 4, 2015. On May 9, two digital singles "Blowin" and "Girl Friend" was released. Their seventh Japanese album "7iro" (pronounced Nanairo) was released on September 9, which placed first on Japan's Oricon Daily Chart, selling 21,909 copies within the first 24 hours of its release.

A sub-unit, Funky Galaxy debuted on Oct 28, 2015, composed of the rappers, Kwangsu, Jihyuk and Geonil. The leading song from the group's debut self-titled extended play, "Jesus", featured Avu-chan from the Japanese band Queen Bee.

=== 2016–2018: Mandatory military service, solo activities and departure from Maroo ===
Sungmo's second Japanese mini album The Future with U was released on February 2, 2016.

Supernova released their 19th Japanese single ""Matakimito…" on February 24, 2016.

On May 27, 2016, Sungje completed his military service, and shortly after members Kwangsoo, Sungmo, Jihyuk, and Geonil announced their temporary leave for military service.

Yunhak then released his next album Real on June 29, 2016, while Sungje worked on releasing his first solo album It's Time which came out on August 10, 2016.

October 16, 2016, while touring at the "Supernova Live Tour: Bro" it was announced currently active members Yunhak and Sungje will give out a mini album on January 25, 2017. Their first album as a sub-unit was Yours Forever and their second mini album 2Re:M was released on August 30, 2017.

On October 27, 2016, it was announced member Sungje will star in his first South Korean movie. The film later named Guest House was released both in Japan on December 23, 2017, and Korea on Feb 22, 2018.

Yunhak's third solo album The One was released on January 17. 2018.

Supernova have ended their contracts with Maroo Entertainment on June 21, 2018. After becoming free agents, the members with the exception of Sungmo (who has signed with a different agency) opened a new office SV ENT.

On Nov 5, Supernova released their Japanese single "Chapter II", which placed first on Japan's Oricon Daily Chart and fifth on the weekly chart.

In 2018, Yunhak signed a management contract with Korean drama production company Hobakdungkul. He was cast in the upcoming SBS TV Saturday primetime drama Fates and Furies, which is produced by the same company. It will air in December.

=== 2019–present: Sungmo's departure ===
On January 23, 2019, it was confirmed Sungmo would not be returning and Supernova would continue as a five-member group.

== Controversies ==
=== Gambling scandal ===
In 2020, the two oldest members of Supernova, leader Yoonhak and Sungje (both members of both main group and subunit Double Ace) were accused of illegal gambling abroad. The first accusation against them was on September 15, 2020, when Yoonhak and Sungje were accused by Incheon Metropolitan Police Agency of playing baccarat once or twice between 2016 and 2018 in the Philippines, in which they allegedly won 50 million won (almost US$40,000). The second charge against them was in November 2020, when they were accused of illegal online gambling in South Korea, in which according to the charge, they used third parties to act as their avatars so as not to raise suspicions of illegal betting for the South Korean authorities.

=== Extramarital affair allegations ===
In 2021, Kwangsoo (one of the three rappers of Supernova and member of subunit Funky Galaxy), was accused of having an extramarital affair with Shinohara Ryoko, a famous Japanese singer and actress who at that time was married to fellow actor Masachika Ichimura, which led to their divorce and the loss of custody of her two children to her ex-husband (since her alleged affair with Kwangsoo would have motivated their turbulent divorce).

== Members ==
Current (active)

- Jung Yunhak (정윤학), Spica Yunhak (Note: In addition to being a member of the main group, he is also a member of the subunit Double Ace, the vocal subunit of Supernova.)
- Kim Sungje (김성제), Sirius Sungje
- Kim Kwangsoo (김광수), Becrux Kwangsoo (Note: In addition to being a member of the main group, he is also a member of the subunit Funky Galaxy, the rap subunit of Supernova.)
- Jihyuk (Song Hunyong; 송헌용), Acrux Jihyuk (Note: He is the only member of Supernova who uses a different stage name from his birth name: his stage name is Song Ji-hyuk (송지혁), Jihyuk (지혁) or Acrux Jihyuk, while his real name is Song Heon-yong or Song Hun-yong (송헌용).)
- Park Geonil (박건일), Canopus Geonil

Former

- Yoon Sungmo (윤성모), Vega Sungmo (2007–2019)

== Discography ==
=== Korean ===
- The Beautiful Stardust (2007)

=== Japanese ===
- Hana (2009)
- Six Stars (★★★★★★) (2010)
- Hop Step Jumping! (2010)
- 4U (2011)
- Go for It! (2012)
- Six (2013)
- 7iro (2015)
- Paparazzi (2019)
- Cloud Nine (2021)

== Awards ==
Years	Awards
2009	Cyworld Digital Music Awards: Ting's Choice Artist award <TTL>
2011	1st KOMCA Music Award : Hallyu Music Award
2012	26th Golden Disk Awards: K-POP Award in Digital Music
