= Jung Yoon-hak =

South Korean actor

- Born: Jung Yoon-hak; 2 December 1984 (age 41); Seoul, South Korea
- Other names: Yoonhak, Jung Yunhak, Spica Yoonhak
- Education: Kyung Hee University, Aichi University
- Occupations: Actor; model; singer
- Years active: 2007–present
- Agent(s): Stone Music Entertainment, SV ENT
- Known for: My Unfortunate Boyfriend; Bouncer; Fates & Furies

Jung Yoon-hak (Korean: 정윤학) is a South Korean actor, model and singer. He is the leader of Supernova, and member of its sub-unit Double Ace, along with fellow vocalist SungJe. He is known for his lead roles in My Unfortunate Boyfriend, Bouncer and Ichijiku no Mori.

== Personal life ==
On April 3, 2020, it was revealed that Jung Yoon-hak had tested positive for the coronavirus on April 1. He started to show symptoms three days after returning to South Korea from Japan. On April 3, 2020, he was quarantined and was treated at a hospital in Seoul. He recovered from the sickness and returned to his projects.

== Filmography ==
=== Television ===
Year	Title	Role	Ref.
2011	Sign	Boy Band "VOICE" member	
2011	Koisuru Kimchi	Won-joon	
2015	My Unfortunate Boyfriend	Kang Hee Chul	
2017	Bouncer	Hachiro Shinya	
2018-2019	Fates & Furies	Kang Eui Gun	
2023	Flaglia	Yuku	

=== Film ===
Year	Title	Role	Language	Ref.
2011	Our after school	Himself	Korean	
2011	A Love Song For You	Lee	Korean	
2014	Fig forest	Nao	Korean	
2014	The end of the world	Choi Dong Kwon	Korean	
2014	Ichijiku no Mori	Yeong Ho	Korean	

=== Hosting ===
Year	Title	Role	Notes	Ref.
2020	G-EGG	Himself	Main Host	

== Theater ==
Year	English title	Korean title	Role	Ref.
2022	Confession of Murder	살인의 고백	Choi Hyung Goo	
