= Rock, Rock, Rock (TV series) =

2010 South Korean miniseries by KBS

- Promotional poster
- Written by: Park Kyung-sun; Bang Hyo-geum
- Directed by: Lee Won-ik
- Starring: No Min-woo; Hong Ah-reum
- Country of origin: South Korea
- No. of episodes: 4

Production
- Executive producer: Bae Kyung-soo
- Producer: Kang Byung-taek
- Running time: 60 minutes

Original release
- Network: KBS2
- Release: December 11 – December 18, 2010

Rock, Rock, Rock (Korean: 락 락 락) is a 2010 South Korean miniseries produced by KBS about the life of Boohwal founder and rock musician Kim Tae-won, played by No Min-woo. The four-episode musical drama follows Kim's life from middle school to 2003.

== Plot ==
Kim Tae-won (No Min-woo) is an outcast at school, frequently laughed at by his peers. His only escape is newly discovered rock music, introduced to him by his uncle. Tae-won steals his older brother's unused guitar and learns to play a Led Zeppelin song by himself. Later, in high school he becomes the "Jimmy Page" of his neighborhood, showing off his guitar skills in duels and competitions. Being hot-blooded and overly enthusiastic about music and love, he soon becomes known as a hooligan. After losing his first love and going through depression, Tae-won decides to become a rock star, and founds a band named The End, which is soon renamed Boohwal (lit. "Resurrection" or "Rebirth"). After changing vocalists, Tae-won secures a deal with a record company and Boohwal releases its first successful single, Heeya, which becomes an instant hit. But Tae-won feels that his talents are being disregarded, because even though he wrote the song, fans only admire the band's singer. This eventually leads to arguments within the band and Boohwal breaks up. With a new line-up, however, they release a second album, that becomes a complete failure, tossing Tae-won to the edge of drug addiction, depression and serious mental illness. An aspiring singer, Kim Jae-ki pulls Tae-won back to reality, offering his vocals to form Boohwal anew. However, after the album recording, Jae-ki gets into a car accident and dies. Tae-won asks his brother, Jae-hee to take his place and they succeed. Years later Boohwal's first vocalist, the now-successful solo artist Lee Seung-chul asks Tae-won for a collaboration but they part ways once again after only one album. Finally in 2003, Tae-won's songwriting abilities are acknowledged at a popular televised music award ceremony. While celebrating the event at a diner, Tae-won meets an older rocker who calls himself "a third-rate guitarist" (played by the real Kim Tae-won in a cameo).

== Cast ==
- No Min-woo as Kim Tae-won
- Hong Ah-reum as Hyun-joo
- Jang Kyung-ah as Soo-yeon
- Lee Jong-hwan as Lee Seung-chul
- Bang Joong-hyun as Kim Jong-seo
- Devin as Shin Dae-chul
- Kang Doo as Lee Tae-yoon
- No Min-hyuk as Jimi Hendrix
- Kim Jong-seo as Tae-won's uncle
- Ahn Jae-min as Byung-chan
- Kang Shin-ha as Dong-pal
- Jo Sun-hyung as Lee Ji-woong
- Kim Yoon-tae as Seung-chul's manager
- Song Joong-geun
- Joo Ho
- Lee Deok-hee
- Lee Dal-hyung
- Lee Won-hee
- Noh Young-hak as Tae-won's older brother
