= Park Wan-kyu =

South Korean singer

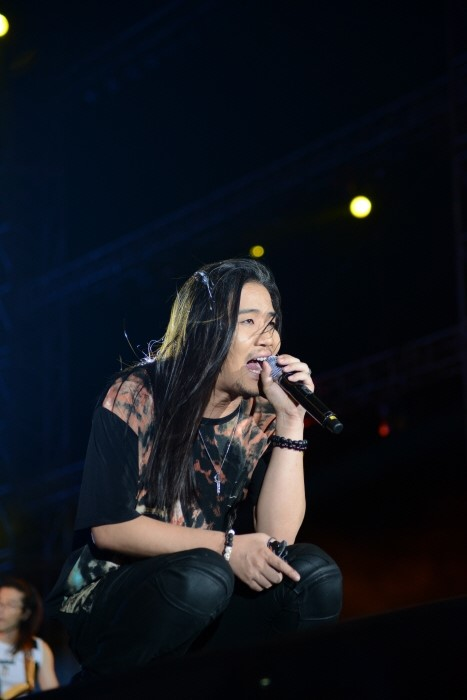
- Park in 2014

Background information
- Born: December 1, 1973 (age 52); Pyeongtaek, South Korea
- Genre: Rock
- Occupations: Singer
- Years active: 1996–present
- Member of: Boohwal

- Park Wan-kyu
- Hangul: 박완규
- Hanja: 朴完奎
- RR: Bak Wangyu
- MR: Pak Wan'gyu

Park Wan-kyu (Korean: 박완규; born December 1, 1973) is a South Korean singer. He was a lead vocalist of the band Boohwal, and left them to release his first solo album, with the title track "Love of a Thousands Years (천 년의 사랑)" that became his signature song in 1999 but returned to the group in 2019 after 22 years.

He has recorded many soundtracks for Korean dramas, and had his first substantial acting role in one in 2013.

== Music career ==
=== Boohwal ===
In 1997, as Boohwal's vocalist he recorded their 5th album, Discovery of Fire with them, singing their title song "Lonely Night," and reunited with them in 2011 for their collaboration project with the song "Secret." When discussing Boohwal's several vocalists, the band's leader Kim Tae-won said he sang with an authentic soulfulness which made his vocals both sad and beautiful. In 2019 he rejoined Boohwal.

=== Television ===
He appeared as a contestant on I Am a Singer and in the concert special "Survival – I am a Singer" at the Expo 2012 in Yeosu.

=== Drama soundtracks and acting ===
He has performed a number of OSTs for K-dramas, including "Always" for Goddess of Marriage in 2013, in which he also acted, playing the part of a legendary rocker on hiatus in the citrus plantations of Jejudo, living as his own boss as a free spirit, with his wife. Others include 2014's "Wind Breeze" for Empress Ki, and a rock ballad "Stop Time" in April 2016 for The Royal Gambler.

== Personal life ==
In September 2011, in an appearance on tvN's show Love Song he talked about his divorce, and expressed an apology to his ex-wife and children.

== Discography ==
=== Studio album ===
- Thousand Years of Love (1999)
- It's Now Or Never (2002)
- Exodus (2006)

=== Greatest hits album ===
- Park Wan Kyu 1999–2006 (2006)

=== Soundtrack appearances ===
Year	Title	TV series
2000	"Tired of Waiting for You"	Look Back in Anger
2001	"Alone"	Cowboy Bebop
2002	"In Another Time"	Fun Movie
2002	"Help Me Love"	Glass Slippers
2003	"Love Is"	I Run
2004	"Judgment Day"	Human Market
2007	"Where You Live"	A Happy Woman
2008	"Fate"	Hong Gil-dong
2008	"Lifetime"	The Kingdom of the Winds
2009	"The Center of the World"	Strike Love
2011	"One Day of Love"	The Princess' Man
2012	"Parting Ways"	God of War
2012	"Here I Stand"	2012 Tving OSL
2013	"A Day"	Hur Jun, The Original Story
2013	"Always"	Goddess of Marriage
2014	"The Wind"	Empress Ki
2016	"Time Stops"	The Royal Gambler

== Filmography ==
=== Television series ===
Year	Title	Role	Network	Notes
2013	Goddess of Marriage	Jung Dae-hyun	SBS	Supporting role
2014	Modern Farmer	President of Rock Club	SBS	Cameo

== Awards and nominations ==
Year	Award	Category	Nominated work	Result	Ref.
2012	Korea Broadcasting Prizes	Singer	Himself	Won	
