= Boohwal =

South Korean rock band

Boohwal(부활)
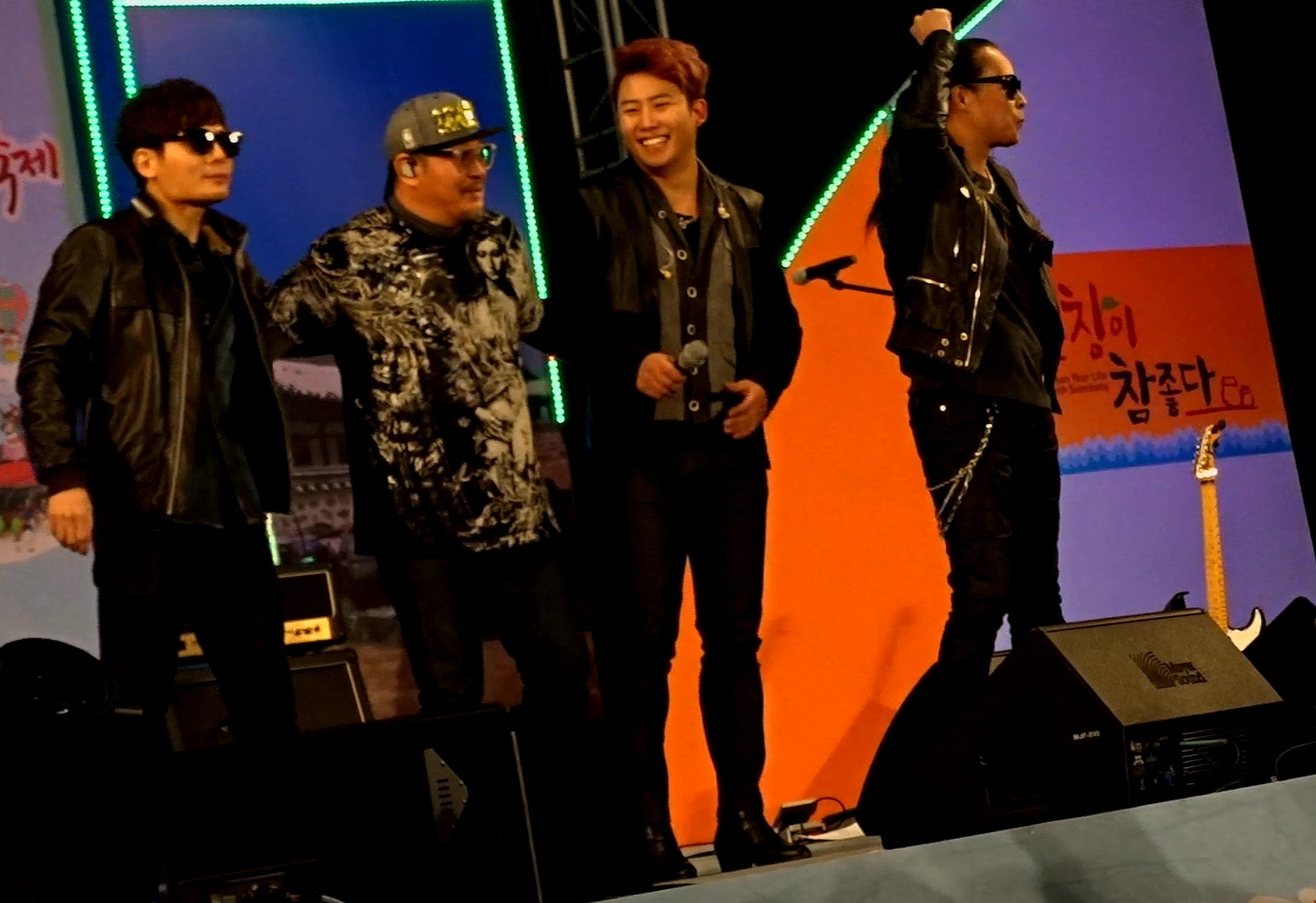
- Boohwal in 2015

Background information
- Origin: South Korea
- Genres: Rock, pop, heavy metal, hard rock
- Years active: 1986–present
- Labels: KT Music (label); Boohwal Entertainment (agency)
- Members: Kim Tae-won (김태원); Lee Yoon Jong (이윤종); Chae Je Min (채제민); Park Wan Kyu (박완규)
- Past members: See Members History
- Website: bornagainent.co.kr

Boohwal (Korean: 부활; lit. 'Born Again') is a South Korean rock band, formed in 1985 by the lead guitarist/songwriter Kim Tae-won.

== History ==
=== Formation and the 1980s ===
Kim Tae-won changed the name of the group from "The End" to "부활" ("Boohwal") in ‘86 following the departure of the vocalist Kim Jong Seo (김종서). They led the heavy metal boom in the 80s along with other bands such as Baekdoosan (백두산), Sinawe (시나위), H2O, and Black Hole (블랙홀). Boohwal, Baekdoosan, and Sinawe were called the ‘Big 3’ by the media as they were all led by talented guitarists (Boohwal – Kim Tae Won, Baekdoosan – Kim Do Kyun 김도균, Sinawe – Shin Dae Chul 신대철), had unique talented vocalists and all aimed to create heavy metal music. However, unlike bands like Sinawe, they have been concentrating more on Korean-style melodic rock ballads, especially after their 3rd album.

After receiving high praises in the underground music scene for their music, they became instantly popular once they released their first major album. The album featured the most popular vocalist to come out of Boohwal, Lee Seung-Cheol (이승철). The title song, "희야" (Heeya) became an instant hit. Kim Tae Won produced bell ringing sounds with his guitar for that song and a number of aspiring guitarists tried to mimick it. The 2nd album, also with Lee Seung Chul, was also a big success. Their success was a result of multiple aspects, including Kim Tae Won's ability to write beautiful songs ranging from rock to ballad, Lee Seung Chul's ability to sing, and Boohwal's overall talent for music. However, Lee Seung Chul and Kim Tae Won went their separate ways in 1988. Kim Tae Won worked on a number of side projects until getting the band together for their 3rd album.

=== 1990s ===
After regrouping, they released their third album in 1993 featuring the hit single “사랑할수록” (Sarang hal soo rok – The More I Love). The album was a success, partly due to the emotional story of Kim Jae Gi (김재기), the original vocalist at the start of the recording, who died in a traffic accident. After the death of Kim Jae Gi, Kim Jae Hee(김재희), who was the younger brother of Kim Jae Gi, was scouted by Kim since his voice color resembled that of his brother. He did not record any of the songs on the third album, but he later became the official vocalist and went on to record the fourth album. Unfortunately, the album was a failure. Kim Jae Hee left Boohwal after the fourth album. Unlike in the 80s, rock music in Korea didn't fare well in the 90s, with the emergence of dance music as the most popular genre of music. Although Kim Tae Won kept Boohwal (부활) from disappearing as other rock bands did during that time, they went through a number of lineup changes.

In 1997, Kim discovered another talented vocalist, Park Wan-kyu and recorded Boohwal's 5th album with their title song "Lonely Night." They succeed making a big hit in the Korean music industry once again. Park did not stay long with Boohwal, and Boohwal started another search for a new vocalist.

=== 2000s ===
In 2002, they teamed up with Lee Seung-Cheol (이승철) again, releasing their eighth album 새, 벽 (Sae Byuk – Bird, Wall). The title song, “Never Ending Story”, was one of the most popular songs that year. With this album they not only regained popularity among the older fans who remember them from the 80s, but also teenagers who thought Lee Seung-cheol was a newcomer. Although most people welcomed the new album, some critics argued that Boohwal's music had become too soft, especially Kim Tae Won's style of playing the guitar.

2005 marked Boohwal's 20th anniversary. They have been one of the most prominent Korean bands, making music for more than 20 years. They continue to create melodic rock with talented vocalists and talented musicians. A number of popular singers went through Boohwal including Kim Jong Seo, Lee Seung Chul, Park Wan-kyu, and others.

2008–2009 was a turning point for Boohwal, when its leader, Kim Tae Won, showed up on a number of different variety shows on MBC, SBS, and KBS. He eventually became a regular on the currently-popular show Qualifications of Men (남자의 자격) , which is the second part of the KBS show Happy Sunday. Also, with their new vocalist, Jung Dong Ha, they started to attract more fans, surprisingly girls.

=== 2010s–present ===
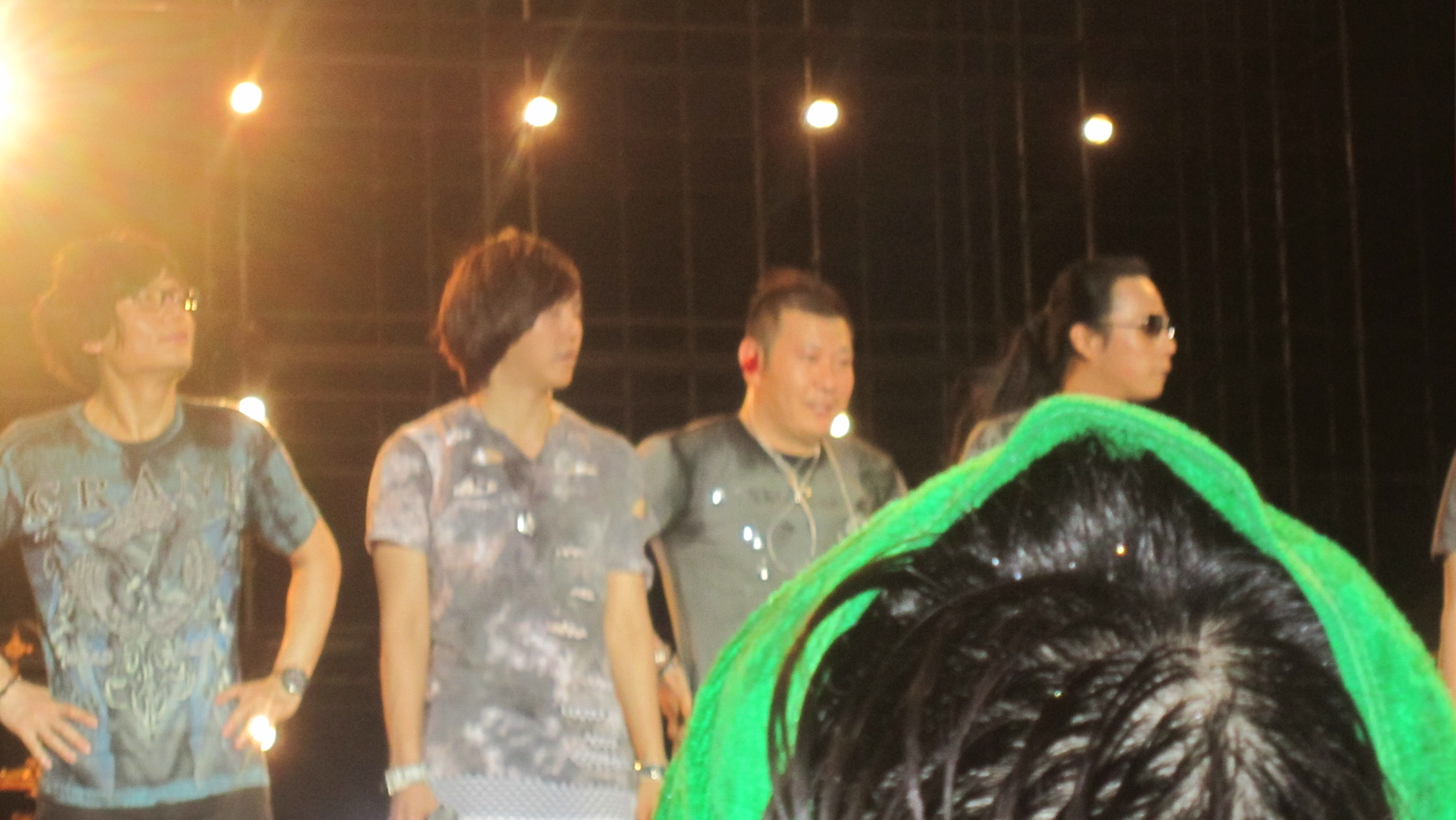
Boohwal in 2011

Disappearing at the end of 2013, they reappeared (reborn) in 2014 with their new vocalist Kim Dong Myung on Immortal Great Songs 2 (TV KBS2) . They's restarted concerts and showing up on the medias.

2015 marked Boohwal's 30th anniversary with 10th vocal Kim Dong Myung. They re- proved their legendary careers.

2015-2016 are good missionary joining years for the public relation songs about longing for reunification of two Koreas (To be ONE & PROLOGUE), spread and use refined words (AS SONGS) and advertise the Korea traditional wine (MAKGEOLI DREAM).

In 2019, the band announced Park Wan-kyu has returned as Boohwal's vocalist.

== Members ==
=== Current members ===
- Park Wan-kyu – vocals
- Kim Tae-won – guitar
- Lee Yoon-jong – bass guitar
- Chae Jae-min – drums

=== Past members ===
Past members are lined up according to their involvement years, and album.

Name	Active Year	Vocal	Guitarist	Bassist	Drummer	Keyboard	Released Album
The End	1984	Lee Tae-yun	Lee Ji-wung Kim Tae-won	Lee Tae-yun	Hwang Tae-sun	-	-
1st Boohwal	1985	Kim Jong-seo	Lee Ji-wung Kim Tae-won	Lee Tae-yun	Hwang Tae-sun	-	-
2nd Boohwal	1985 - 1986	Lee Seung-cheol	Lee Ji-wung Kim Tae-won	Kim Byeong-chan	Hwang Tae-sun	-	Rock Will Never Die (1st album)
3rd Boohwal	1987	Lee Seung-cheol	Kim Tae-won	Jeong Jun-gyo	Kim Seong-tae	Seo Young-jin	Remember (2nd album)
Game	1990	Shin Seong-wu Hong Seong-seok	Kim Tae-won	Hwang Gil-sang	Hwang Tae-sun	Lee Hyeon-ju	Existence
4th Boohwal	1992 - 1993	Kim Jae-ki	Kim Tae-won	Jeong Jun-gyo	Kim Seong-tae	-	Loss of Memory (3rd album)
5th Boohwal	1993 - 1995	Kim Jae-hui	Kim Tae-won	Jeong Jun-gyo	Kim Seong-tae	-	About the Idle Thoughts (4th album)
6th Boohwal	1997	Park Wan-kyu	Kim Tae-won	Jeong Jun-gyo	Jeong Dong-cheol	-	Discovery of Fire (5th album)
7th Boohwal	1999	Kim Ki-yeon	Kim Tae-won	Jeong Jun-gyo	Chae Jae-min	Choi Seung-chan	Ideal Sight (6th album)
8th Boohwal	2000	Lee Seong-wuk	Kim Tae-won	Seo Jae-hyuk	Kim Kwan-jin	Eom Su-han	Color (7th album)
9th Boohwal	2002	Lee Seung-cheol (Guest)	Kim Tae-won	Seo Jae-hyuk	Chae Jae-min	Eom Su-han	A New Day / Dawn (8th album)
10th Boohwal	2003	Jeong Dan	Kim Tae-won	Seo Jae-hyuk	Chae Jae-min	Eom Su-han	Over the Rainbow (9th album)
11th Boohwal	2005 - 2009	Jeong Dong-ha	Kim Tae-won	Seo Jae-hyuk	Chae Jae-min	Eom Su-han	Lyrics (10th album) Love (11th album)
12th Boohwal	2009 - 2012	Jeong Dong-ha	Kim Tae-won	Seo Jae-hyuk	Chae Jae-min	Jang Ji-wan (Guest)	25th Anniversary: Retrospect (12th - Part 1 album) 25th Anniversary: Retrospect II (12th - Part 2 album)
13th Boohwal	2012 - 2014	Jeong Dong-ha	Kim Tae-won	Seo Jae-hyuk	Chae Jae-min	-	Purple Wave (13th album)
14th Boohwal	2014 - 2018	Kim Dong-myung	Kim Tae-won	Seo Jae-hyuk	Chae Jae-min	-	-
15th Boohwal	2019–Present	Park Wan-kyu	Kim Tae-won	Lee Yoon-jong	Chae Jae-min	-	(planned for 14th album)

== Discography ==
=== Studio albums ===
No.	Year	Title
1	1986	Rock Will Never Die (ko)
2	1987	Remember (ko) (회상; Hoesang)
3	1993	Loss of Memory (ko) (기억상실; Gieoksangsil)
4	1995	About the Idle Thoughts (ko) (잡념에 관하여; Jamnyeome gwanhayeo)
5	1997	Discovery of Fire (ko) (불의 발견; Burui balgyeon)
6	1999	Ideal Sight (ko) (이상 시선; Isang siseon)
7	2000	Color (ko)
8	2002	A New Day (ko) (새벽; Saebyeok; 'Dawn')
9	2003	Over the Rainbow (ko)
10	2005	Lyrics (ko) (서정; Seojeong)
11	2006	Love (ko) (사랑; Sarang)
12.1	2009	25th Anniversary: Retrospect (ko)
12.2	2010	25th Anniversary: Retrospect II (ko)
13	2012	Purple Wave

=== Digital Singles ===
Year	Title
2010	Because I Love You (사랑해서 사랑해서; Saranghaeseo saranghaeseo) Note: This song was originally written by Kim Tae-won for Amateur Band mission on Qualifications of Men.
2011	If It Were Now (그때가 지금이라면; Geuttaega jigeumiramyeon)
2011	Castle Drawn in the Heart (Part of Share the Vision album compilation) (가슴에 그린 성; Gaseume geurin seong)
2011	The Only Road (Part of Warrior Baek Dong-soo drama original soundtrack)

=== Collaborations ===
Year	Title	Collaborators
2011	Collaboration Project _ +1 [Secret] (비밀; Bimil)	Park Wan-kyu
2011	Collaboration Project _ +2 [Everybody Love] (누구나 사랑을 한다; Nuguna sarangeul handa)	Jeong Dan • Park Wan-kyu • Lee Seong-wok
2011	Collaboration Project _ +3 [From Separation to Eternity] (이별에서 영원으로; Ibyeoreseo yeongwoneuro)	Yun Si-nae (ko)

== Filmography ==
=== TV appearances ===
Year	Network	Appearance	Roles
2010	KBS	KBS Drama Special Series: Rock, Rock, Rock	Boohwal

=== Commercials ===
Year	Advertisement
1988	Hye-tae HTB Ads for Boritein (Barley Beverages).
2011	STL Evolution ads.

== Awards and nominations ==
=== Mnet Asian Music Awards ===
Year	Category	Work	Result
2002	Best Rock Performance	"Never Ending Story"	Nominated
2009	Best Rock Performance	"I Remember" (생각이 나; Saenggagi na)	Won
2010	Best Band Performance	"What Love Is"	Nominated

=== Other awards ===
- Winner of 10th Grand Prize at the 2009 Korean Cultural Entertainment Grand Prix

== See also ==
- Sinawe
- Kim Tae-won
- Lee Seung-cheol
- Park Wan-kyu
- Qualifications of Men
