= Kim Sung-min (actor) =

South Korean actor (1973–2016)

- 김성민
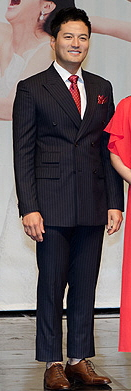
- Kim in 2013
- Born: Kim Sung-taek; February 14, 1973; Seoul, South Korea
- Died: June 26, 2016 (aged 43); Seoul, South Korea
- Education: Seoul National University; Seoul College - Physical and Social Education in Golf
- Occupation: Actor
- Years active: 1995–2014
- Agent: Lobe Entertainment
- Spouse: Lee Han-na (m. 2013)

Korean name
- Hangul: 김성민
- RR: Gim Seongmin
- MR: Kim Sŏngmin

Former name
- Hangul: 김성택
- RR: Gim Seongtaek
- MR: Kim Sŏngt'aek

Kim Sung-min (Korean: 김성민, February 14, 1973 – June 26, 2016) was a South Korean actor.

== Career ==
Kim made his acting debut in 1995, as a member of the theatre troupe Constellation (Korean: 성좌). In 2002, he rose to stardom in the hit television drama Miss Mermaid. Miss Mermaid screenwriter Im Sung-han cast him again in her next drama, Lotus Flower Fairy (also known as Heaven's Fate, 2004). But when Miss Mermaid was exported to Taiwan and the Philippines, foreign viewers had difficulty pronouncing his given name "Sung-taek," so to further build his Korean Wave profile, Kim adopted the stage name Kim Sung-min in 2005. He then starred in leading roles in Single Again and Tears of Diamond.

Comic supporting roles followed in Couple or Trouble (2006) where he played a selfish yet hapless husband to an heiress, and Family's Honor (2008) where he played a playboy twin brother who has an unlikely romance with a tomboyish policewoman. Then Kim surprised audiences by portraying a darker character, an adulterous husband in What's for Dinner? (2009), followed by his first period drama, The Reputable Family (2010). He also appeared in the popular variety-reality show Qualifications of Men, and during its run was selected as a guest by the United States Air Force Thunderbirds on their 2009 Far East Tour at Osan Air Base.

On December 4, 2010, Kim was arrested in a drug scandal which also implicated other celebrities. During police questioning, he admitted to habitually using methamphetamine and marijuana, and smuggling the former substance into Korea. On January 24, 2011, the Seoul High Court sentenced him to four years in prison; upon Kim's appeal, the jail term was reduced to 30 months suspended for four years, along with two years of probation, 120 hours of community service, 40 hours of substance abuse education, and a ₩904,500 fine. Kim was released from a prison in Uiwang, Gyeonggi Province on March 25, 2011. Because of this, he was dropped from Qualifications of Men and went on a hiatus.

After laying low for two years, Kim made his acting comeback in Can We Get Married? in 2012. Due to the conservatism of Korean network television, he has so far appeared solely in cable dramas, including Can't Stand Anymore (2013), and The Three Musketeers (2014) for which he trained in martial arts, horseback riding and the Manchu language for his role as a Qing dynasty general.

On March 11, 2015, Kim was again arrested for purchasing and ingesting methamphetamine. He allegedly bought 0.8 grams on November 24, 2014, from a dealer who had smuggled the drug from Cambodia. During police questioning, Kim claimed that he only used the drug once, and that his relapse had been caused by troubles in his marriage and a slump in his acting career. For illegal drug use and violating his probation, Kim was sentenced to 10 months in prison and a ₩700,000 (US$590) fine.

== Personal life ==
Kim married dentist Lee Han-na on February 20, 2013. Lee is the head of a Gangnam dental clinic and has frequently appeared on television to give dental health advice.

== Death ==
On 24 June 2016, Kim's wife called the police to check on her husband, saying that he had threatened to kill himself following an argument. Police found him attempting suicide by hanging in the bathroom. On 26 June, the police stated Kim, who had been in a coma since 24 June, was diagnosed as brain dead at 2AM KST. The diagnosis was confirmed at 10:15 AM KST, and Kim's family agreed to donate his organs. He was buried on 28 June.

== Filmography ==
=== Television series ===
Year	Title	Role
1998	Hometown of Legends "Wailing Myo"	
1999	Beautiful Choice	
2002	Miss Mermaid	Lee Joo-wang
2003	Women Next Door	Jung-woo
2004	Lotus Flower Fairy	Kim Moo-bin
2005	Single Again	Lee Min-ho
2005	Tears of Diamond	Choi Hyung-min
2006	Couple or Trouble	Billy Park
2008	Before and After: Plastic Surgery Clinic	Choi Yong-woo
2008	On Air	Manager (cameo, episode 21)
2008	Family's Honor	Ha Tae-young
2009	Queen of Housewives	Heo Tae-joon's friend (cameo, episode 16)
2009	What's for Dinner?	Jung Sun-woo
2010	The Reputable Family	Kim Won-il
2010	Coffee House	Airline passenger (cameo)
2012	Can We Get Married?	Do-hyun
2013	Can't Stand Anymore	Hwang Kang-ho
2014	Can We Fall in Love, Again?	Kim Young-ho (cameo, episode 10)
2014	The Three Musketeers	Ingguldai

=== Film ===
Year	Title	Role
2006	Time	Plastic surgeon
2007	The Mafia, the Salesman	Kim Sang-doo
2009	I'm Happy	Hyung-chul
2011	Invasion of Alien Bikini	Director (cameo)
2013	Closet (short film)	
2013	Eating, Talking, Faucking	Bill
2013	The Weight	(cameo)

=== Variety show ===
Year	Title	Notes
2008	SBS Golf: Prism Lessons	Host
2009–2010	Qualifications of Men	Cast member

== Theater ==
Year	Title	Role
2010	Jack the Ripper	Daniel
2010	Black Comedy	
2012	The Sound of Music	
2012–2013	Bedroom Farce	Malcolm
2013	Black Comedy	Georg Bamberger

== Awards and nominations ==
Year	Award	Category	Nominated work	Result
2002	MBC Drama Awards	Best New Actor	Miss Mermaid	Won
2002	MBC Drama Awards	Best Couple Award with Jang Seo-hee	Miss Mermaid	Won
2004	MBC Drama Awards	Excellence Award, Actor	Lotus Flower Fairy	Won
2009	SBS Drama Awards	Best Supporting Actor in a Drama Special	Family's Honor	Nominated
2009	KBS Entertainment Awards	Top Entertainer Award	Qualifications of Men	Won
2010	5th Asia Model Festival Awards	Model Star Award	—N/a	Won
