= Kim Tae-won =

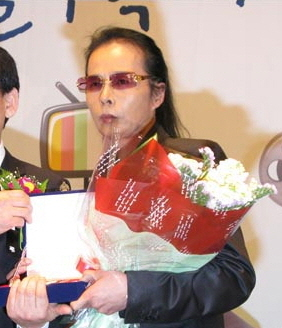
- Kim in April 2010

Background information
- Born: April 12, 1965 (age 61); Yongsan-gu, Seoul, South Korea
- Genres: Heavy metal; hard rock; rock; pop
- Instrument: Guitar
- Years active: 1985–present

Kim Tae-won (김태원, April 12, 1965) is a Korean guitarist with over 40 years of experience in Korean music industry, currently leading one of the most successful rock bands in Korean music history, Boohwal. His life was dramatised in a four episode KBS2 short series Rock, Rock, Rock, where Kim was portrayed by musician-actor No Minwoo.

== Early life ==
He was a talented billiards player, having achieved the level of 300 points as a highschool senior. His guitar skill was even more outstanding: He is said to have been able to play proficiently the guitar riff in Led Zeppelin's "Babe I'm Gonna Leave You" in middle school and the guitar solo of (towards the end of the song) Deep Purple's "Highway Star" at a much faster speed than normal. He slowly rose to fame among fellow students in the Seodaemun area, his home town. He was called "the best guitarist everybody knows".

== Career ==
At 20, he started a rock band called The End with two colleagues, one of whom was Kim Jong-seo who later left the band to join the then more established rock act Sinawe. With The End, he performed covers of western rock songs for audiences in various places in Korea. It was when Jong-Seo joined that the band changed its name into "Boohwal", which means resurrection in Korean. After Kim Jong-seo left the band, Lee Seung-cheol joined as new lead vocalist and they gained huge success with their first hit number, "Heeya (희야)."

Together with Sinawe leader Shin Dae-chul and Baekdoosan's Kim Do-kyun, Kim worked on the guitar musical project D.O.A. and released the album Dead or Alive in 2003.

== Personal life ==
In 2011, Kim was diagnosed with stomach cancer. In one of Qualifications of Men episodes the member had to testing for cancer, but unfortunately Kim's results were positive. Kim underwent surgery to remove the tumor on 16 January, and underwent another one on the 22nd. All of the tumors have been removed successfully, he is now completely cured.

Awards and achievements
Preceded by Lee Seung-gi	KBS Entertainment Awards for Best Entertainer; 2009	Succeeded by Eun Ji-won; Park Myeong-su
