= 2017 MBC Entertainment Awards =

17th edition of award ceremony

- Date: December 29, 2017
- Site: MBC Public Hall, Sangam-dong, Mapo-gu, Seoul
- Hosted by: Kim Hee-chul; Han Hye-jin; Yang Se-hyung

Television coverage
- Network: MBC
- Duration: 200 minutes
- Ratings: 9.9% (Part 1); 12.1% (Part 2)

The 2017 MBC Entertainment Awards presented by Munhwa Broadcasting Corporation (MBC), took place on December 29, 2017, at MBC Public Hall in Sangam-dong, Mapo-gu, Seoul. It was hosted by Kim Hee-chul, Han Hye-jin and Yang Se-hyung. The nominees were chosen from MBC variety, music shows and sitcom that aired from December 2016 to November 2017.

== Nominations and winners ==
(Winners denoted in bold)

Grand Prize (Daesang)	Program of the Year	Scriptwriter of the Year
**Jun Hyun-moo** – **I Live Alone**; Gim Gu-ra – Radio Star; Kim Sung-joo – King of Mask Singer; Park Myeong-su – Infinite Challenge; Park Na-rae – I Live Alone; Yoo Jae-suk – Infinite Challenge	**I Live Alone**; Infinite Challenge; King of Mask Singer; Living Together in Empty Room; Radio Star; Wizard of Nowhere	**Lee Kyung-ha** – **I Live Alone**
Top Excellence Award
Variety Category	Show/Sitcom Category	Radio Category
Male	**Kim Gook-jin** – **Radio Star**, **Section TV**; Gim Gu-ra – Radio Star, King of Mask Singer; Kim Sung-joo – King of Mask Singer; Yoon Jong-shin – Radio Star	**Jung Kyung-mi**, **Park Joon-hyung** – **Park Joon-hyung & Jung Kyung-mi's Two O'clock Hurray!**
**Park Myeong-su** – **Infinite Challenge**, **All Broadcasting in the World**; Jun Hyun-moo – I Live Alone; Kim Soo-ro – Wizard of Nowhere; Yoo Jae-suk – Infinite Challenge	**Kim Gook-jin** – **Radio Star**, **Section TV**; Gim Gu-ra – Radio Star, King of Mask Singer; Kim Sung-joo – King of Mask Singer; Yoon Jong-shin – Radio Star	**Jung Kyung-mi**, **Park Joon-hyung** – **Park Joon-hyung & Jung Kyung-mi's Two O'clock Hurray!**
Female	**Kim Gook-jin** – **Radio Star**, **Section TV**; Gim Gu-ra – Radio Star, King of Mask Singer; Kim Sung-joo – King of Mask Singer; Yoon Jong-shin – Radio Star	**Jung Kyung-mi**, **Park Joon-hyung** – **Park Joon-hyung & Jung Kyung-mi's Two O'clock Hurray!**
**Park Na-rae** – **I Live Alone**; Han Eun-jung – Living Together in Empty Room; Kim Shin-young – Living Together in Empty Room; Lee Guk-joo – We Got Married Season 4, Secretly Greatly	**Kim Gook-jin** – **Radio Star**, **Section TV**; Gim Gu-ra – Radio Star, King of Mask Singer; Kim Sung-joo – King of Mask Singer; Yoon Jong-shin – Radio Star	**Jung Kyung-mi**, **Park Joon-hyung** – **Park Joon-hyung & Jung Kyung-mi's Two O'clock Hurray!**
Excellence Award
Variety Category	Show/Sitcom Category	Radio Category
Male		**Yiruma** – **Yiruma's Golden Disk**; **Seo Kyung-seok** – **Women's Era, We Are Yang Hee-eun & Seo Kyung-seok**
**Henry Lau** – **I Live Alone**, **All Broadcasting in the World**; **Yang Se-hyung** – **Infinite Challenge**; Joo Sang-wook – All Broadcasting in the World; Yoon Jung-soo – Wizard of Nowhere	**Kim Hyun-cheol** – **King of Mask Singer**; Choi Min-yong – King of Mask Singer, Wizard of Nowhere; Lee Yoon-seok – King of Mask Singer; Yang Dong-geun – Borg Mom	**Yiruma** – **Yiruma's Golden Disk**; **Seo Kyung-seok** – **Women's Era, We Are Yang Hee-eun & Seo Kyung-seok**
Female		**Yiruma** – **Yiruma's Golden Disk**; **Seo Kyung-seok** – **Women's Era, We Are Yang Hee-eun & Seo Kyung-seok**
**Han Hye-jin** – **I Live Alone**; Hong Jin-young – Living Together in Empty Room; Lee Soo-kyung – All Broadcasting in the World; Yura – Living Together in Empty Room	**Park Han-byul** – **Borg Mom**; Choi Yeo-jin – Borg Mom; Park Seul-gi – Section TV; Shin Bong-sun – King of Mask Singer	**Yiruma** – **Yiruma's Golden Disk**; **Seo Kyung-seok** – **Women's Era, We Are Yang Hee-eun & Seo Kyung-seok**
Rookie Award
Variety Category	Show/Sitcom Category	Radio Category
Male		**Jeong Yu-mi** – **Jeong Yu-mi's FM Date**; **Moon Cheon-sik** – **Jung Seon-hee & Moon Cheon-sik's Now is the Era of Radio**
**Lee Si-eon** – **I Live Alone**; Kian84 – I Live Alone; Kim Jin-woo – Wizard of Nowhere; Um Ki-joon – Wizard of Nowhere	**Kai** – **King of Mask Singer**; Cha Eun-woo – Show! Music Core; Choi Jung-won – Borg Mom; Sleepy – Section TV	**Jeong Yu-mi** – **Jeong Yu-mi's FM Date**; **Moon Cheon-sik** – **Jung Seon-hee & Moon Cheon-sik's Now is the Era of Radio**
Female		**Jeong Yu-mi** – **Jeong Yu-mi's FM Date**; **Moon Cheon-sik** – **Jung Seon-hee & Moon Cheon-sik's Now is the Era of Radio**
**Han Chae-young** – **Wizard of Nowhere**; Kim Yeon-koung – I Live Alone; Oh Hyun-kyung – Living Together in Empty Room; Sandara Park – Living Together in Empty Room, All Broadcasting in the World	**Seol In-ah** – **Section TV**; Hwang Bo-ra – Borg Mom; Ivy – Borg Mom; Xiyeon – Show! Music Core	**Jeong Yu-mi** – **Jeong Yu-mi's FM Date**; **Moon Cheon-sik** – **Jung Seon-hee & Moon Cheon-sik's Now is the Era of Radio**
Popularity Award	MC Award	PD's Award
**Han Eun-jung** – **Living Together in Empty Room**; **P.O** – **Living Together in Empty Room**	**Lee Sang-min** and **Lee Jae-eun** – **Section TV**	**King of Mask Singer team**
Best Teamwork Award	Achievement Award	Special Award
**Wizard of Nowhere team**	**Kim Gook-jin**, **Yoon Jong-shin**, **Gim Gu-ra**, **Cho Kyu-hyun** – **Radio Star**	**Sohyang** – **King of Mask Singer** (Music Show); **Yoon Jung-soo** – **Wizard of Nowhere** (Variety Show); **Yang Dong-geun** – **Borg Mom** (Sitcom)
Best Couple Award	Scriptwriter of the Year in Radio	Special Award in Radio
**Kian84** and **Park Na-rae** – **I Live Alone**; Gim Gu-ra and Han Eun-jung – Living Together in Empty Room; Jun Hyun-moo and Han Hye-jin – I Live Alone; Kim Tae-won and Yoon Jung-soo – Wizard of Nowhere; P.O and Sandara Park – Living Together in Empty Room; Yang Dong-geun and Park Han-byul – Borg Mom	**Lee Yoon-yong – Park Joon-hyung & Jung Kyung-mi's Two O'clock Hurray!**	**Yang Ji-woon – Home Run Start**; **Park Yoon-kyung – 57 Minutes of Traffic Information**
Achievement Award in Radio	Scriptwriter of the Year in Current Events	Special Award in Current Events
**Im Shin-hyuk – Green Umbrella Children's Foundation**	**Jang Eun-jeong – PD Note**	**Lee Jae-eun – MBC Live Tonight**

== Presenters ==
Order	Presenter	Award	Ref.
1	Kim Young-chul, Kwon Hyuk-soo	Rookie Award, Show/Sitcom Category	
2	Park Myeong-su, Jo Se-ho	Rookie Award, Variety Category	
3	Bae Cheol-soo, Kim Shin-young	Top Excellence/Excellence/Rookie Award, Radio Category	
4	Seo Jang-hoon, Yoon Hoo	Scriptwriter of the Year; PD's Award	
5	Heo Kyung-hwan, Hong Jin-young	MC Award	
6	Gim Gu-ra, Han Eun-jung	Special Award	
7	Yoon Jung-soo, Kim Saeng-min	Popularity Award	
8	Lee Si-eon, Kian84	Best Teamwork Award	
9	Sleepy, Lee Guk-joo	Best Couple Award	
10	Yang Se-hyung, Park Na-rae	Achievement Award	
11	Lee Sang-min, Seol In-ah	Excellence Award, Show/Sitcom Category	
12	Jun Hyun-moo, Han Hye-yeon	Excellence Award, Variety Category	
13	Han Chae-young, Kim Jin-woo (WINNER)	Top Excellence Award, Show/Sitcom Category	
14	Kim Seung-soo, Hani (EXID)	Top Excellence Award, Variety Category	
15	Oh Sang-jin, Kim Sung-ryung	Program of the Year	
16	Yoo Jae-suk	Grand Prize (Daesang)	

== Special performances ==
Order	Artist	Song/Spectacle	Ref.
1	Han Hye-jin	Gashina (가시나) (Original: Sunmi)	
2	Sohyang	Atlantis Princess (아틀란티스 소녀) (Original: BoA)	
3	EXID ft. Park Na-rae	DDD (덜덜덜)	
4	Kim Young-chul & Hong Jin-young	Ring Ring (따르릉)	
