= Han Hye-jin =

Han Hye-jin may refer to:

- Han Hye-jin (actress) (born 1981), South Korean actress
- Han Hye-jin (model) (born 1983), South Korean model
