= Living Together in Empty Room =

2017 South Korean television program

- Also known as: My Unexpected Housemate, Insolent Housemates, Outrageous Roommates
- Genre: Variety show
- Directed by: Choi Yoon-jeong; Jeon Hwi-je; Jo Doo-yeon
- Starring: Various artists
- Country of origin: South Korea
- Original language: Korean
- No. of episodes: 33

Production
- Executive producer: Kim Goo-san
- Running time: 95 minutes
- Production company: MBC

Original release
- Network: MBC
- Release: April 14, 2017 – March 23, 2018

Living Together in Empty Room (Korean: 발칙한 동거 – 빈방 있음; RR: Balchikhan donggeo – binbang isseum), also known as My Unexpected Housemate, is a 2017 South Korean television program starring various artists. After premiering its pilot episodes on January 27 and 28, it officially replaced Duet Song Festival and began to air on MBC on Fridays at 21:50 (KST) starting April 14, 2017. The last episode was broadcast on March 23, 2018.

== Format ==
The program revolves mostly around celebrities who live alone or those who are interested in becoming roommates with other celebrities for a short period of time. The participant's house that the roommate(s) temporarily live in becomes the landlord, while the other member(s) are referred to as tenants. Each time there is a new living arrangement, the first order of business is to go over the lease agreement as a group, specifically, the section of the contract where each person lists up to three terms for their time together as roommates. The terms can be rules/guidelines for the roommates to follow, but usually, the terms are activities that each person would like to experience altogether while living as roommates. Once everyone has agreed upon each other's terms, the contract is signed by all parties and an acceptable amount for rent is negotiated that the tenant(s) will then pay the landlord before they start living together roommates. They will live together for a few days and carry out the contractual provisions.

At the end, they will sincerely think about the memories with each other after living together, and each of them will separately respond to a survey that they will select "YES" or "NO" to become roommates with each other again; the results are announced shortly thereafter. This survey is only symbolic, and not decisive, i.e. all of them select "YES" doesn't mean that they will be roommates again.

== Broadcast timeline ==
Period	Time (KST)	Type
January 27, 2017	Friday at 17:45 – 19:55	Pilot
January 28, 2017	Saturday at 23:15 – 0:45	Pilot
April 14 – July 28, 2017	Fridays at 21:30 – 22:10 (Part 1) 22:10 – 23:05 (Part 2)	Regular
August 4 – September 1, 2017	Fridays at 21:50 – 23:10	Regular
September 8 – December 1, 2017	Not airing due to MBC strike	
December 8, 2017 – March 23, 2018	Fridays at 21:50 – 23:10	Regular

== Cast members ==
#	Landlord	Renters	Episodes	Notes / References
1	Han Eun-jung	Kim Gu-ra	Pilot	Notes Han Eun-jung selected "YES" and Kim Gura selected "NO".
2	P.O (Block B)	Kim Shin-young, Hong Jin-young	Pilot	Notes Each of them selected "YES" for others.
3	WJSN	Oh Se-deuk	Pilot	Notes Each of them selected "YES" for other.
4	Brave Brothers	Yang Se-chan, Jeon So-min	1–4	Notes Each of them selected "YES" for others.
5	Han Eun-jung	Kim Gu-ra	1–4	Notes Han Eun-jung selected "NO" and Kim Gura selected "YES".
6	P.O (Block B)	Kim Shin-young, Hong Jin-young	1–4	Notes Each of them selected "YES" for others.
7	Yoni P & Steve J	Jo Se-ho, P.O (Block B)	4–8	Notes Each of them selected "YES" for others.
8	K.Will	Han Eun-jung	4–8	Notes Each of them selected "YES" for other.
9	Yura (Girl's Day)	Kim Gu-ra, Kim Min-jong	4–8	Notes Yura selected "YES" for others. Kim Gura and Kim Min-jong selected "NO" for each other and "YES" for Yura.
10	Ji Sang-ryeol	Oh Yeon-ah	8–11	Notes Ji Sang-ryeol selected "YES" and Oh Yeon-ah selected "NO".
11	Han Eun-jung	P.O (Block B), Lee Tae-hwan (5urprise)	8–11	Notes Each of them selected "YES" for others.
12	Heechul (Super Junior)	GFriend	8–11	Notes Each of them selected "YES" for other.
13	Ji Sang-ryeol	Oh Hyun-kyung, Kim Gu-ra	12–19, 27–30	Notes Oh Hyun-kyung selected "YES" for each others. Kim Gura selected "NO" for each others. Ji Sang-ryeol selected "YES" for Oh Hyun-kyung and "NO" for Kim Gura. Since episode 27, Ji Sang-ryeol and Kim Gura switched roles, their part was filmed in Japan.
14	Hong Jin-young	iKon (Jinhwan, Bobby), Jin Jeong-seon	12–15	Notes Each of them selected "YES" for others, except Jin Jeong-seon selected "NO" for Bobby and "YES" for others.
15	Jo Se-ho	Sandara Park, P.O (Block B)	12–16	Notes Jo Se-ho and P.O switched roles for the second half of their segment. Each of them selected "YES" for other.
15	P.O (Block B)	Jo Se-ho, Sandara Park	17–18, 20	Notes Jo Se-ho and P.O switched roles for the second half of their segment. Each of them selected "YES" for other.
17	Oh Chang-seok	Jiyeon (T-ara)	16–19	Notes Each of them selected "YES" for other.
18	Yura (Girl's Day)	Kim Min-jong, Sojin (Girl's Day)	19–21	
19	DinDin	Lim Ju-eun, Yoon Doo-joon (Highlight)	20–22	Notes Lim Ju-eun selected "YES" for each others.
20	Sungkyu (Infinite)	Lee Kyung-kyu	21–24, 26–31	
21	Kim Seung-soo	Choi Jung-won	22–25, 31–33	Notes There is their first reunion on television after 14 years since 2003 when they co-starred on SBS's drama Sweetheart. Each of them selected "YES" for other.
22	Cheetah	2PM (Chansung, Wooyoung)	24–26	
23	Yoon Jung-soo	Yook Joong-wan (Rose Motel), Wanna One (Ong Seong-wu, Kim Jae-hwan, Kang Daniel)	25–29	
24	Han Hye-yeon	Jinyoung (Got7), P.O (Block B)	30–33	
25	Solbi	Kim Dong-hyun, Sleepy (Untouchable)	32–33	

== Guest appearance ==
Episode #	Part of cast #	Guest	References
2	5	Seo Jang-hoon	
7–8	9	Sojin (Girl's Day)	
11	12	Kim Shin-young	
20	15	Zico (Block B)	
23	20	Kim Min-seok	
24	20	Microdot	

== Ratings ==
In the table below, the blue numbers represent the lowest ratings and the red numbers represent the highest ratings.

=== 2017 ===
List of ratings in 2017 (Pilot, Episodes 1–23)

Episode #	Broadcast Date	TNmS Ratings	AGB Ratings
Pilot	January 27	5.6%	5.4%
Pilot	January 27	8.4%	8.3%
Pilot	January 28	4.0%	3.8%
Official broadcast
1	April 14	5.1%	5.3%
1	April 14	4.7%	5.5%
2	April 21	4.6%	4.9%
2	April 21	3.8%	4.9%
3	May 5	5.6%	4.9%
3	May 5	3.7%	4.0%
4	May 12	5.3%	5.2%
4	May 12	4.0%	4.3%
5	May 19	5.2%	4.9%
5	May 19	3.8%	3.9%
6	May 26	3.4%	3.7%
7	June 2	4.6%	4.7%
7	June 2	3.9%	4.7%
8	June 9	4.2%	3.9%
8	June 9	4.0%	4.9%
9	June 16	4.1%	3.7%
9	June 16	3.6%	4.5%
10	June 23	4.6%	4.1%
10	June 23	4.1%	4.7%
11	June 30	4.1%	3.8%
11	June 30	3.6%	3.2%
12	July 7	4.6%	4.3%
12	July 7	5.2%	5.9%
13	July 14	4.1%	4.8%
13	July 14	4.4%	4.8%
14	July 21	3.6%	3.5%
14	July 21	4.3%	4.0%
15	July 28	5.1%	4.0%
15	July 28	5.2%	4.7%
16	August 4	4.0%	5.1%
17	August 11	4.3%	4.9%
18	August 18	4.1%	4.5%
19	August 25	4.9%	4.7%
20	September 1	3.5%	3.7%
21	December 8	3.9%	4.3%
22	December 15	4.6%	4.9%
23	December 22	4.0%	3.3%

Remarks

- May 26, 2017: Due to broadcast of 2017 FIFA U-20 World Cup's match between South Korea and England, episode 6 was delayed to broadcast later 30 minutes than usual and in only one part.
- June 2, 2017: Episode 7 was broadcast early at 20:55 (KST).
- Since episode 16, the program broadcast a continuous episode instead of division into two parts per episode.
- September 8 – December 1, 2017: Episode 21 was cancelled due to MBC strike. A special episode, included the highlights of the 1970s trio's part (Oh Hyun-kyung, Kim Gura and Ji Sang-ryeol), was aired instead on September 8.
- December 29, 2017: Episode 24 was cancelled due to broadcast of 2017 MBC Entertainment Awards.

=== 2018 ===
List of ratings in 2018 (Episodes 24–33)

Episode #	Broadcast Date	TNmS Ratings	AGB Ratings
24	January 5, 2018	3.9%	3.6%
25	January 12, 2018	3.9%	3.1%
26	January 19, 2018	3.5%	3.0%
27	January 26, 2018	3.0%	3.0%
28	February 2, 2018	3.1%	3.2%
29	February 16, 2018	3.9%	3.6%
30	February 23, 2018	2.3%	3.0%
31	March 2, 2018	3.5%	3.0%
32	March 16, 2018	3.5%	2.4%
33	March 23, 2018	3.4%	2.3%

Remarks

- February 9, 2018: Episode 29 was cancelled due to broadcast of 2018 Winter Olympics.
- February 23, 2018: Due to broadcast of 2018 Winter Olympics, episode 30 was late aired at 23:55.
- March 9, 2018: Episode 32 was cancelled due to broadcast of 2018 Winter Paralympics opening ceremony.

== Awards and nominations ==
Year	Award	Category	Recipients	Result
2017	17th MBC Entertainment Awards	Program of the Year	Living Together in Empty Room	Nominated
2017	17th MBC Entertainment Awards	Top Excellence Award, Variety Category	Han Eun-jung	Nominated
2017	17th MBC Entertainment Awards	Top Excellence Award, Variety Category	Kim Shin-young	Nominated
2017	17th MBC Entertainment Awards	Excellence Award, Variety Category	Hong Jin-young	Nominated
2017	17th MBC Entertainment Awards	Excellence Award, Variety Category	Yura	Nominated
2017	17th MBC Entertainment Awards	Rookie Award, Variety Category	Oh Hyun-kyung	Nominated
2017	17th MBC Entertainment Awards	Rookie Award, Variety Category	Sandara Park	Nominated
2017	17th MBC Entertainment Awards	Popularity Award	Han Eun-jung	Won
2017	17th MBC Entertainment Awards	Popularity Award	P.O	Won
2017	17th MBC Entertainment Awards	Best Couple Award	Kim Gu-ra & Han Eun-jung	Nominated
2017	17th MBC Entertainment Awards	Best Couple Award	P.O & Sandara Park	Nominated
2018	18th MBC Entertainment Awards	Top Excellence Award in Variety Category	Oh Hyun-kyung	Nominated
2018	18th MBC Entertainment Awards	Excellence Award in Variety Category	Choi Jung-won	Nominated

== See also ==
- Roommate
