= Life Bar =

Korean television entertainment program

- Promotional poster
- Also known as: Tipsy Talk
- Genre: Talk show
- Starring: Shin Dong-yup; Kim Jun-hyun; Kim Hee-chul; Han Hye-jin
- Country of origin: South Korea
- Original language: Korean
- No. of seasons: 2
- No. of episodes: 118

Production
- Running time: 60 minutes
- Production company: SM C&C

Original release
- Network: tvN
- Release: December 8, 2016 – April 11, 2019

Life Bar (Korean: 인생술집; RR: Insaengsuljip) is a South Korean Talk show distributed by tvN every Thursday night at 11:00. Season 1 broadcast its final episode on April 13, 2017. Season 2 premiered on May 18, 2017.

== Format ==
It is a unique talk show where celebrity guests and the three show hosts candidly share their life stories over a drink. The ratings for the show were upped to "19+", making it the only R-rated show on tvN.

Although it is a talk show entertainment program, it contains live drinking scenes. It broadcasts on the 15-year-old broadcast, and it was broadcast by the audience rating of 19 years old or over. However, after the second store, It is broadcasting again with a 15-year-old rating.

permanent segment:

- Masterpiece of Love: A quote to explain your life.

== Broadcaster ==
=== Host ===
Name	Duration	Ref.
Shin Dong-yup	December 8, 2016 – April 11, 2019	
Kim Jun-hyun	December 8, 2016 – July 20, 2017; January 4, 2018 – April 11, 2019	
Kim Hee-chul	May 18, 2017 – April 11, 2019	
Han Hye-jin	June 7, 2018 – April 11, 2019	
Tak Jae-hoon	December 8, 2016 – April 13, 2017	
Eric Nam	February 2 – April 13, 2017	
Yoo Se-yoon	August 3 – December 28, 2017	
Yura	May 18 – December 28, 2017	
Jang Do-yeon	January 4 – May 24, 2018	

=== Employees ===
Name	Duration
Kim Root	May 18 – July 20, 2017
J Model	August 3, 2017 – May 24, 2018
Jin Hae-Sung	June 7, 2018 – April 11, 2019

== List of episodes ==
Year	Episodes	Originally aired	
Year	Episodes	First aired	Last aired
2016	4	December 8, 2016	December 29, 2016
2017	47	January 5, 2017	December 28, 2017
2018	52	January 4, 2018	December 27, 2018
2019	15	January 3, 2019	April 11, 2019

== Ratings ==
In the ratings below, the highest rating for the show will be in red, and the lowest rating for the show will be in blue each year.

=== 2016 ===
List of ratings (episode 1–4)

Episode #	Air Date	AGB Nielsen ratings
Season 1
1	December 8, 2016	1.260%
2	December 15, 2016	0.856%
3	December 22, 2016	1.126%
4	December 29, 2016	0.651%

=== 2017 ===
List of ratings (episode 5–51)

Episode #	Air Date	AGB Nielsen ratings
Season 1
5	January 5, 2017	1.151%
6	January 12, 2017	0.665%
7	January 19, 2017	0.944%
8	January 26, 2017	0.7%
9	February 2, 2017	1.087%
10	February 9, 2017	0.809%
11	February 16, 2017	0.794%
12	February 23, 2017	0.616%
13	March 2, 2017	0.603%
14	March 9, 2017	0.495%
15	March 16, 2017	1.047%
16	March 23, 2017	1.010%
17	March 30, 2017	1.069%
18	April 6, 2017	0.801%
19	April 13, 2017	0.760%
Season 2
20	May 18, 2017	0.987%
21	May 25, 2017	1.270%
22	June 1, 2017	0.870%
23	June 8, 2017	1.449%
24	June 15, 2017	1.597%
25	June 22, 2017	1.632%
26	June 29, 2017	1.077%
27	July 6, 2017	1.259%
28	July 13, 2017	1.468%
29	July 20, 2017	1.132%
30	August 3, 2017	1.431%
31	August 10, 2017	1.239%
32	August 17, 2017	1.561%
33	August 24, 2017	1.361%
34	August 31, 2017	1.206%
35	September 7, 2017	1.731%
36	September 14, 2017	1.185%
37	September 21, 2017	1.032%
38	September 28, 2017	1.491%
39	October 3, 2017	2.197%
40	October 12, 2017	1.183%
41	October 19, 2017	1.155%
42	October 26, 2017	1.065%
43	November 2, 2017	1.784%
44	November 9, 2017	1.253%
45	November 16, 2017	1.334%
46	November 23, 2017	1.459%
47	November 30, 2017	1.499%
48	December 7, 2017	1.439%
49	December 14, 2017	1.761%
50	December 21, 2017	1.149%
51	December 28, 2017	1.604%

=== 2018 ===
List of ratings (episode 52–103)

Episode #	Air Date	AGB Nielsen ratings
Season 2
52	January 4, 2018	1.720%
53	January 11, 2018	1.420%
54	January 18, 2018	1.943%
55	January 25, 2018	1.533%
56	February 1, 2018	2.099%
57	February 8, 2018	2.844%
58	February 15, 2018	2.037%
59	February 22, 2018	1.555%
60	March 1, 2018	1.795%
61	March 8, 2018	1.592%
62	March 15, 2018	1.285%
63	March 22, 2018	1.781%
64	March 29, 2018	1.101%
65	April 5, 2018	1.684%
66	April 12, 2018	1.187%
67	April 19, 2018	1.431%
68	April 26, 2018	0.974%
69	May 3, 2018	1.307%
70	May 10, 2018	1.469%
71	May 17, 2018	1.203%
72	May 24, 2018	0.982%
73	May 31, 2018	2.025%
74	June 7, 2018	1.979%
75	June 14, 2018	2.486%
76	June 21, 2018	1.826%
77	June 28, 2018	2.391%
78	July 5, 2018	1.901%
79	July 12, 2018	2.331%
80	July 19, 2018	2.371%
81	July 26, 2018	2.844%
82	August 2, 2018	1.584%
83	August 9, 2018	2.473%
84	August 16, 2018	2.429%
85	August 23, 2018	2.053%
86	August 30, 2018	2.312%
87	September 6, 2018	2.032%
88	September 13, 2018	1.710%
89	September 20, 2018	1.102%
90	September 27, 2018	1.396%
91	October 4, 2018	2.065%
92	October 11, 2018	1.644%
93	October 18, 2018	1.210%
94	October 25, 2018	1.177%
95	November 1, 2018	2.161%
96	November 8, 2018	2.011%
97	November 15, 2018	1.121%
98	November 22, 2018	1.546%
99	November 29, 2018	3.028%
100	December 6, 2018	2.407%
101	December 13, 2018	2.158%
102	December 20, 2018	1.169%
103	December 27, 2018	1.668%

=== 2019 ===
List of ratings (episode 104–118)

Episode #	Air Date	AGB Nielsen ratings
Season 2
104	January 3, 2019	1.320%
105	January 10, 2019	1.820%
106	January 17, 2019	1.900%
107	January 24, 2019	1.988%
108	January 31, 2019	2.765%
109	February 7, 2019	1.994%
110	February 14, 2019	3.566%
111	February 21, 2019	2.017%
112	February 28, 2019	1.711%
113	March 7, 2019	1.607%
114	March 14, 2019	1.376%
115	March 21, 2019	1.874%
116	March 28, 2019	1.593%
117	April 4, 2019	1.122%
118	April 11, 2019	1.536%

- Note that the show airs on a cable channel (pay TV), which plays part in its slower uptake and relatively small audience share when compared to programs broadcast (FTA) on public networks such as KBS, SBS, MBC or EBS.

== Awards ==
Year	Award	Category	Recipient	Result	Ref.
2017	2018 Korea First Brand Awards	Talk Show	Life Bar	Won	
