= Seo Min-jung =

South Korean actress (born 1979)

- Born: July 11, 1979 (age 47); South Korea
- Education: Ewha Womans University - Bachelor of Laws
- Occupation: Actress
- Years active: 2000–2007; 2017–2019
- Spouse: Ahn Sang-hoon (m. 2007)
- Children: 1

Korean name
- Hangul: 서민정
- Hanja: 徐敏貞
- RR: Seo Minjeong
- MR: Sŏ Minjŏng

Seo Min-jung (Korean: 서민정; born July 11, 1979) is a South Korean actress. She made her entertainment debut in 2000 as a VJ on cable program Music Under Heaven. Seo rose to stardom in the 2006 sitcom Unstoppable High Kick!, playing the role of a teacher whose high school student has a crush on her. After marrying Korean-American dentist Ahn Sang-hoon on August 25, 2007, Seo retired from show business and migrated to New York City. She gave birth to a daughter, Ahn Yae-jin, in 2008.

== Filmography ==
=== Television drama ===
- Honest Living (2002)
- That Summer's Typhoon (2005)
- Love and Ambition (2006)
- High Kick! (2006)

=== Film ===
- Jenny, Juno (2005)
- Arctic Tale (2007) (Korean dubbed narration)

=== Variety show ===
- Taste of Wife, Reality Show, Macomb, New York Life (TV Chosun)
- Music Under Heaven (NTV)
- Hotline School (Mnet)
- Curiosity Paradise (SBS)
- Section TV (MBC)
- King of Mask Singer (MBC)
- Radio Star (MBC)
- In-Laws in Practice (2018, tvN)
- Stranger (JTBC)

== Awards ==
- 2005 SBS Drama Awards: Special Award for Radio (Our Joyful Young Days)
- 2007 Mnet 20's Choice Awards: Best Kiss with Choi Min-yong (Unstoppable High Kick!)
