= Magic Cellphone =

- Promotional Poster
- Also known as: Magic Handphone
- Genre: Web series Romance; Fantasy
- Developed by: Go Dae-hwa
- Written by: Kwon Nam-gi
- Directed by: Kwon Nam-gi; Kim Jae-jong
- Starring: Kim Jin-woo; Park Min-ji; Kwak In-joon
- Country of origin: South Korea
- No. of episodes: 10

Production
- Producers: Im Sung-kyun; Han Sang-pil; Li Mi; Chen Yi
- Running time: 10 minutes
- Production companies: Aura Media; Guan Ya Media

Original release
- Release: July 13 – September 14, 2016

Magic Cellphone (Korean: 마법의 핸드폰; RR: Mabeobui haendeupon) is a 2016 South Korean web series that aired online from July 13, 2016 to September 14, 2016. The SBS drama is a Korean-Chinese joint venture of the production company Aura Media. It aired weekly on Sohu TV.

== Plot ==
The drama revolves around the romance between a man named Oh Tae-ji (Kim Jin-woo), who works at a makeup store, and his first love Lee Ji-hee, who is also known as Latte (Park Min-ji), a new actress who is the subject of attention. They finally meet again when Latte has a fan-sign event at the makeup store where Tae-ji is working at. Later on, Tae-ji will be given a magic cellphone from a mysterious old lady that can be used to protect the person he loves, which is Latte, in the midst of a crisis and he's set on saving her.

== Cast ==
- Kim Jin-woo as Oh Tae-ji
  - Jung Jae-hyuk as young Tae-ji
- Park Min-ji as Lee Ji-hee (Latte)
  - Song Ji-ah as young Ji-hee
- Nam Jung-hee as Ji-hee's grandmother
- Kwak In-joon as Ma Dong-sik
- Kim Mi-so as Chief Jo
- Kim Ki-doo as Kim Ho-chang
- Kang Dong-hwa as Joo-ok
- Kim Sung-gi as Lee Tae-sun
- Moon Soo-ah as Mi-mi
- Han Ji-soo as Rogue Customer 1
- Do Hae as Rogue Customer 2
- Shin Ye-rin as Rogue Customer 3
- Lee Chan-ho as Reporter
