= Wizard of Nowhere =

- Genre: Variety show, Reality show, Travel documentary
- Directed by: Kim Joon-hyun, Seo Jeong-woo
- Starring: Various artists
- Country of origin: South Korea
- Original language: Korean
- No. of episodes: 31 (list of episodes)

Production
- Executive producer: Park Jeong-gyu
- Producer: Ahn Soo-young
- Production location: Multi-countries
- Running time: 70 minutes

Original release
- Network: MBC
- Release: July 30, 2017 – May 27, 2018

Wizard of Nowhere (Korean: 오지의 마법사; RR: Ojiui mabeopsa) is a South Korean travel-reality show on MBC TV that started airing on June 5, 2017. The cast of six, divided into two teams, goes to another country for three days. In those three days, they are given missions to do. Before midnight strikes, they must reach their destination for the day. The cast has no phones or wallets or money with them, or even personal belongings. All they have are the essentials from the producers: sleeping bags, tents, cooking equipment, utensils, and some hiking gear. Most of the time, they rely on hitchhiking to complete strangers to get around.

== Broadcast timeline ==
Episode type	Broadcast date	Broadcast time
Pilot	June 5, 2017	Mondays at 23:00 (KST)
Pilot	June 17, 2017 – July 1, 2017	Saturdays at 23:15 (KST)
Regular	July 30, 2017 – September 3, 2017	Sundays at 18:45 (KST)
Regular	September 10, 2017 – November 12, 2017	Not airing due to MBC Labor Union strike
Regular	November 19, 2017 – May 27, 2018	Sundays at 18:45 (KST)

== Cast ==
=== Regular members ===
Member	Episodes	Corresponding Location
Kim Soo-ro	Pilot 1–4; Regular 1–31	Nepal; Georgia; Kamchatka Peninsula; Sicily; Tasmania; Sri Lanka; Estonia
Um Ki-joon	Pilot 1–4; Regular 1–9, 21–31	Nepal; Georgia; Kamchatka Peninsula; Sri Lanka; Estonia
Yoon Jung-soo	Pilot 1–4; Regular 1–31	Nepal; Georgia; Kamchatka Peninsula; Sicily; Tasmania; Sri Lanka; Estonia
Kim Tae-won	Pilot 1–4; Regular 1–19, 26–31	Nepal; Georgia; Kamchatka Peninsula; Sicily; Estonia
Choi Min-yong	Pilot 2–4; Regular 1–5, 10–20	Nepal; Georgia; Sicily; Tasmania
Kim Jin-woo (WINNER)	Regular 1–25	Georgia; Kamchatka Peninsula; Sicily; Tasmania; Sri Lanka
Han Chae-young	Regular 6–20, 26–31	Kamchatka Peninsula; Sicily; Tasmania; Estonia
Eric Nam	Regular 16–31	Sicily; Tasmania; Sri Lanka; Estonia
Don Spike	Regular 20–31	Tasmania; Sri Lanka; Estonia

=== Guest members ===
Member	Episodes	Corresponding Location
Niel (Teen Top)	Pilot 1–4	Nepal
Kim Yong-woon (Kim Jin-woo's father)	Regular 8–9	Kamchatka Peninsula
Oh Se-deuk	Regular 15–19	Sicily
Yook Joong-wan (Rose Motel)	Regular 21–25	Sri Lanka
Han Hyun-min	Regular 22–25	Sri Lanka

== List of episodes ==
=== Pilot ===
Episode #	Broadcast date	Visited place	Cast member
1–4	June 5, 2017 – July 1, 2017	Nepal	Kim Soo-ro, Um Ki-joon, Yoon Jung-soo; Kim Tae-won, Choi Min-yong, Niel (Teen Top)

=== Regular broadcast ===
Total episode #	Regular episode #	Broadcast date	Visited place	Cast member
5–9	1–5	July 30, 2017 – August 27, 2017	Georgia	Kim Su-ro, Um Ki-joon, Kim Jin-woo (WINNER); Kim Tae-won, Choi Min-yong, Yoon Jung-soo
10–13	6–9	September 3, 2017; November 19, 2017 – December 3, 2017	Kamchatka Peninsula	Yoon Jung-soo, Um Ki-joon, Han Chae-young; Kim Su-ro, Kim Tae-won, Kim Jin-woo, Kim Yong-woon
13–19	9–15	December 3, 2017 – January 14, 2018	Sicily	Yoon Jung-soo, Kim Tae-won, Choi Min-yong, Eric Nam; Kim Su-ro, Kim Jin-woo, Han Chae-young, Oh Se-deuk
20–24	16–20	January 21, 2018 – February 4, 2018; February 25, 2018 – March 4, 2018	Tasmania	Yoon Jung-soo, Han Chae-young, Kim Jin-woo, Don Spike; Kim Su-ro, Choi Min-yong, Eric Nam
25–29	21–25	March 11, 2018; March 25, 2018 – April 15, 2018	Sri Lanka	Kim Su-ro, Um Ki-joon, Eric Nam, Kim Jin-woo; Yoon Jung-soo, Don Spike, Yook Joong-wan (Rose Motel), Han Hyun-min
30–35	26–31	April 22, 2018 – May 27, 2018	Estonia	Kim Tae-won, Yoon Jung-soo, Don Spike, Han Chae-young; Kim Su-ro, Um Ki-joon, Eric Nam

== Ratings ==
In the ratings below, the highest rating for the show will be in red, and the lowest rating for the show will be in blue each year.

=== 2017 ===
List of ratings in 2017 (episodes 1–13)

Episode #	Broadcast date	Average audience share	
Episode #	Broadcast date	AGB Nielsen (Nationwide)	TNmS (Nationwide)
1	July 30, 2017	5.2%	5.1%
2	August 6, 2017	5.9%	6.2%
3	August 13, 2017	5.7%	5.8%
4	August 20, 2017	6.0%	7.5%
5	August 27, 2017	4.9%	6.3%
6	September 3, 2017	5.5%	5.9%
Ten weeks break due to MBC Labor Union strike
7	November 19, 2017	6.1%	5.8%
8	November 26, 2017	6.5%	6.9%
9	December 3, 2017	5.2%	5.6%
10	December 10, 2017	6.3%	7.2%
11	December 17, 2017	7.3%	6.3%
12	December 24, 2017	8.3%	8.8%
13	December 31, 2017	5.9%	5.3%

=== 2018 ===
List of ratings in 2018 (episodes 14–31)

Episode #	Broadcast date	Average audience share	
Episode #	Broadcast date	TNmS (Nationwide)	AGB Nielsen (Nationwide)
14	January 7	6.8%	7.0%
15	January 14	7.2%	6.6%
16	January 21	7.3%	6.3%
17	January 28	7.6%	6.7%
18	February 4	7.4%	7.9%
Two weeks break due to PyeongChang Olympics 2018
19	February 25	7.3%	7.2%
20	March 4	7.4%	6.0%
21	March 11	7.8%	6.6%
—	March 18	No airing of show this week	
22	March 25	8.1%	6.3%
23	April 1	7.2%	6.2%
24	April 8	6.4%	5.8%
25	April 15	6.2%	5.4%
26	April 22	6.8%	5.7%
27	April 29	5.6%	5.9%
28	May 6	5.1%	4.5%
29	May 13	5.7%	4.5%
30	May 20	5.4%	5.0%
31 (End)	May 27	5.0%	5.0%

== Awards and nominations ==
Year	Award	Category	Recipients	Result
2017	17th MBC Entertainment Awards	Program of the Year	Wizard of Nowhere	Nominated
2017	17th MBC Entertainment Awards	Top Excellence Award, Variety Category	Kim Soo-ro	Nominated
2017	17th MBC Entertainment Awards	Excellence Award, Variety Category	Yoon Jung-soo	Nominated
2017	17th MBC Entertainment Awards	Excellence Award, Variety Category	Choi Min-yong	Nominated
2017	17th MBC Entertainment Awards	Rookie Award, Variety Category	Han Chae-young	Won
2017	17th MBC Entertainment Awards	Rookie Award, Variety Category	Um Ki-joon	Nominated
2017	17th MBC Entertainment Awards	Rookie Award, Variety Category	Kim Jin-woo	Nominated
2017	17th MBC Entertainment Awards	Best Teamwork Award	Wizard of Nowhere	Won
2017	17th MBC Entertainment Awards	Special Award (Variety Show)	Yoon Jung-soo	Won
2017	17th MBC Entertainment Awards	Best Couple Award	Kim Tae-won & Yoon Jung-soo	Nominated
