= Park Min-ji =

South Korean actress (born 1989)

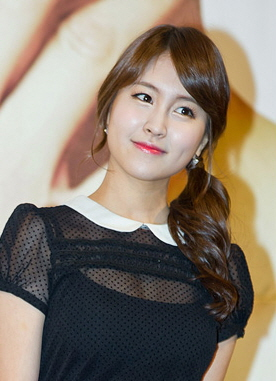
- Park in 2012
- Born: July 22, 1989 (age 37); Nowon District, Seoul, South Korea
- Occupation: Actress
- Years active: 2003–present

Korean name
- Hangul: 박민지
- Hanja: 朴旻智
- RR: Bak Minji
- MR: Pak Minji

Park Min-ji (Korean: 박민지; born July 22, 1989) is a South Korean actress.

== Filmography ==
=== Film ===
Year	Title	Role	Notes
2005	Jenny, Juno	Jenny	
2006	The Peter Pan Formula	Min-ji	
2006	Punch Strike	Min-ah	
2008	His Last Gift	young Min Hye-young	
2008	Do Re Mi Fa So La Ti Do	Shin Na-ri	
2015	Now Playing	So-eun	Segment: "Bribe"
2016	A Man and a Woman	Ha-jung	Magic Phone
2016	Canola	Min-hee	
2018	The Wrath	Wol-ah	
2020	Time to Hunt	Female dealer 3	

=== Television series ===
Year	Title	Role	Network
2005	Nonstop 5	High school girl	MBC
2005	18 vs. 29	young Yoo Hye-chan	KBS2
2006	MBC Best Theater: "I Love You, Ajumma"	Kim Se-ri	MBC
2006	A Salmon's Dream	Goo Ah-ra	KBS2
2006	Fallen Angel Jenny	Jenny	Mnet
2007	Moon Hee	Kim Deul-yi	MBC
2007	My Mom! Super Mom!	Oh Chae-rin	KBS2
2008	You Are My Destiny	Ban Yoon-hee	KBS1
2010	Becoming a Billionaire	Park Kang-sook	KBS2
2012	The Wedding Scheme	Yoo Min-ji	tvN
2012	Quiz of God Season 3	Park Ha-yeong (ep 2)	tvN
2012	The Great Seer	young Ban-ya	SBS
2013	When a Man Falls in Love	Eun-ae	MBC
2014	Miss Hyena	Yeo Shin-yi	Naver TV Cast
2014	Quiz of God 3	Park Ha-yeong (ep 2)	tvN
2016	Cheese in the Trap	Jang Bo-ra	tvN
2016	The Cravings 2		Naver TV Cast
2016	Start Again	Na Young-ja	MBC
2016	Magic Cellphone	Lee Ji-hee (Latte)	Sohu TV
2018	My Contracted Husband, Mr. Oh	Kwon Se-mi	MBC
2018	The Miracle We Met	Ha-jung (Shinhwa Bank Staff)	KBS2
2018	Gangnam Beauty	Ah-reum (ep 2)	JTBC
2018	Ms. Ma, Nemesis	Jung Yoo-jung (photographer)	SBS
2019	Love Affairs in the Afternoon	Go Yoon-ah	Channel A
2020	Brilliant Heritage	Son Bo-mi	KBS1
2020	My Dangerous Wife		MBN
