= Han Hye-jin (model) =

South Korean model

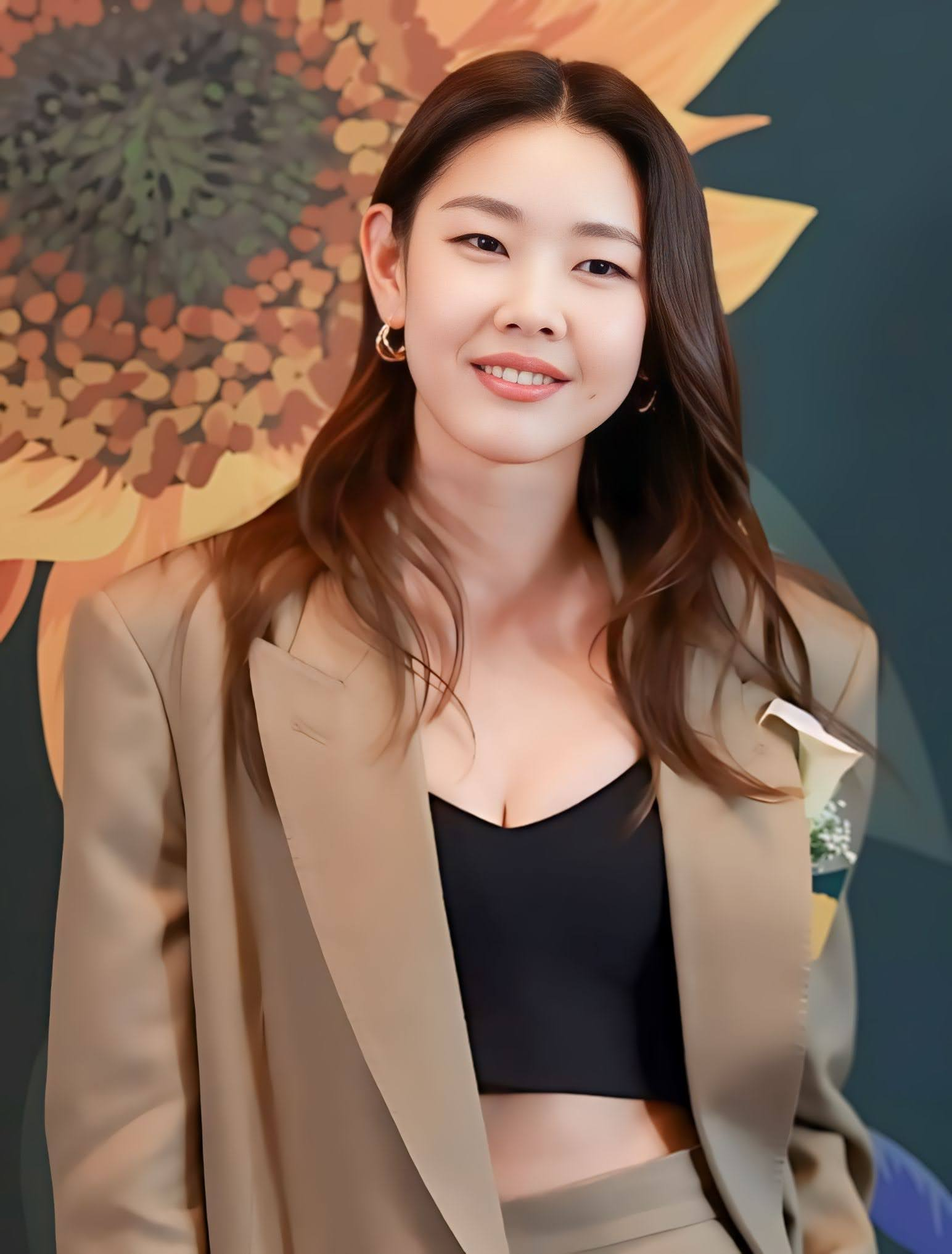
- Han at the Brand Customer Loyalty Awards on May 7, 2024
- Born: March 23, 1983 (age 43)
- Modeling information
- Height: 5 ft 9.5 in (1.77 m)
- Hair color: Dark brown
- Eye color: Brown
- Agency: ESteem

Korean name
- Hangul: 한혜진
- Hanja: 韓惠珍
- RR: Han Hyejin
- MR: Han Hyejin

Han Hye-jin (Korean: 한혜진; born March 23, 1983), also known as Han Jin, is a South Korean fashion model and TV personality. She has been on the covers of many fashion magazines, including the May 2008 and June 2009 Korean editions of Vogue. She walked in the NYFW for 3 years (2006–08).

== Career ==
=== Spring/Summer 2007 ===
3.1 Philip Lim, 6267, Academy of Art University, Agatha Ruiz de la Prada, Aigner, Andrew Gn, Anteprima, Baby Phat, Barbara Bui, Burberry Prorsum, Cacharel, Carmen Marc Valvo, Celine, Chaiken, Chloé, Cividini, Costello Tagliapietra, Costume National, D&G, DKNY, Diane von Furstenberg, Dice Kayek, Dolce & Gabbana, Gaetano Navarra, Gucci, James Coviello, Joanna Mastroianni, Karen Walker, Karl Lagerfeld, Kenzo, Lacoste, Louis Vuitton, Luca Luca, Malo, Marc Jacobs, Marc by Marc Jacobs, Miss Sixty, Monique Lhuillier, Narciso Rodriguez, Peter Som, Pollini by Rifat Ozbek, Rebecca Taylor, Roberta di Camerino, Roberto Cavalli, Ruffian, Sari Gueron, Sonia Fortuna, Sportmax, Thakoon, Valentino, Vena Cava, Yves Saint Laurent, Rive Gauche, Yigal Azrouel.

=== Fall/Winter 2007 ===
3.1 Phillip Lim, Amuleti J, Anne Klein, Antonio Berardi, BCBG Max Azria, Baby Phat, Bottega Veneta, Bruno Pieters, Burberry Prorsum, Costume National, Carmen Marc Valvo, Celine, Chaiken, Chanel, Charles Nolan, Cher Michel Klein, Chloé, Chris Han, Cividini, Cynthia Steffe, Daks by Giles Deacon, Dennis Basso, Derercuny, Designers for Darfur, Dice Kayek, Diesel StyleLab, Dolce & Gabbana, Hussein Chalayan, Issey Miyake, Jason Wu, Karl Lagerfeld, Kenzo, Love Sex Money, Luca Luca, Marc Jacobs, Marc by Marc Jacobs, Massimo Rebecchi, Michael Kors, Monique Lhuillier, Moschino, Nanette Lepore, Peter Som, Proenza Schouler, Richard Chai, Rock & Republic, Ruffian, Salvatore Ferragamo, Sari Gueron, Sportmax, Sybilla, Temperley, Thakoon, Tsumori Chisato, Vera Wang, Viktor & Rolf, Yeohlee, Yigal Azrouel, Zac Posen.

== Personal life ==
It was revealed that Han was in a relationship with baseball player Cha Woo-chan, who plays for the LG Twins. In November 2017, their respective agencies confirmed their break-up.

On February 27, 2018, it was reported that Han was dating television announcer turned entertainer and host Jun Hyun-moo. The pair have worked together hosting MBC's reality television programme I Live Alone and have emceed the special pilot programme "Romance Package" on SBS.

== Filmography ==
=== Television shows ===
Year	Title	Role	Notes
2012	Shinhwa Broadcast	Cast	ep 30 and 31
2016–2021	I Live Alone	Cast Member	
2017	Beauty Bible 2017	MC	with Im Soo-hyang and Yura
2018	Life Bar	Cast Member	
2018	Dating Interference 2	Cast	
2019	Why Did You Come To My House	Host	
2019–2020	More Salty Tour	Cast Member	
2020	Heart Signal 3	Host	
2021	Leader's Love	Host	
2021–2023	Goal Girl	Main Cast	Season 1–3
2023	Cohabiting, Not Married	Host	with Lee Yong-jin
2023	Run Away	Host	
2024	My Sibling's Romance	Host	

=== Web shows ===
Year	Title	Role	Ref.
2022	Zero-Sum Game	Host	
2022	Scene Catchers	Host	

=== Hosting ===
Year	Title	Notes	Ref.
2017	2017 MBC Entertainment Awards	with Kim Heechul and Yang Se-hyung	
2021	2021 SBS Entertainment Awards	with Lee Seung-gi and Jang Do-yeon	

== Awards and nominations ==
=== Listicles ===
Name of publisher, year listed, name of listicle, and placement
Publisher	Year	Listicle	Placement	Ref.
Forbes	2019	Korea Power Celebrity	34th	
Forbes	2020	Korea Power Celebrity	36th	
