= We Got Married =

South Korean reality variety show

- Season 4 logo
- Hangul: 우리 결혼했어요
- RR: Uri gyeolhonhaesseoyo
- MR: Uri kyŏrhonhaessŏyo
- Genre: Reality television
- Country of origin: South Korea
- Original language: Korean
- No. of seasons: 4
- No. of episodes: 373

Production
- Executive producer: Im Jeong-ah
- Producer: Jeon Seong-ho

Original release
- Network: MBC
- Release: 16 March 2008 – 6 May 2017

We Got Married (Korean: 우리 결혼했어요) was a South Korean reality variety show that aired on MBC from 2008 to 2017. The show paired up celebrities who pretended to be married couples and completed various challenges together. The show ran for four seasons and inspired several spin-offs, including a global edition of the show that featured non-Korean celebrities.

== Pilot special ==
The show's pilot episode was aired on 6 February 2008 as a Korean New Year special. On the episode, four arranged celebrity couples had to prepare dinner with a fixed amount of money.

Couples

- Alex & Jang Yoon-jeong
- Jung Hyung-don & Saori
- Crown J & Seo In-young
- Hong Kyung-min & Solbi

== Season 1 ==
With a new format and slightly different couples, newlyweds are given a mission to complete each week. As during the special pilot episode, interviewed participants provide a unique perspective on the ongoing relationship conflicts and developments. All of the recorded material is then played in front of the participants, MCs, and audience who add commentary or clarification.

Beginning with a Lunar New Year's Special in 2009 with three new couples, a new format is introduced into the show, first forecasted through the addition of Kangin and Lee Yoon-ji. Each couple is given a concept to portray; in Kangin and Lee Yoon-ji's case, a college couple living with a limited income.

Original couples

- Alex & Shin Ae (Ep 1-8, 13-34)
- Crown J & Seo In-young (Ep 1-41)
- Shinhwa's Andy & Solbi (Ep 1-28)
- Jung Hyung-don & Saori (Ep 1-8)

Additional couples

- Lee Hwi-jae & Cho Yeo-jeong (Ep 9-17)
- SS501's Kim Hyun-joong & Hwangbo (Ep 9-38)
- Hwanhee & Hwayobi (Ep 25, 29-44)
- Marco & Son Dam-bi (Ep 25, 29-44)
- Choi Jin-young & Lee Hyun-ji (Ep 25)
- Super Junior's Kangin & Lee Yoon-ji (Ep 39-55)
- Jung Hyung-don & Girls' Generation's Taeyeon (Ep 42-54)
- Shin Sung-rok & Kim Shin-young (Ep 42, 45-54)
- Shinhwa's Jun Jin & Lee Si-young (Ep 42, 45-55)

== Season 2 ==
As of May 2009, the producers announced another change in the format with all four couples departing, cutting down to just one couple and shortening the show to just 60 minutes. The show will now portray a more realistic side to what a marriage is, instead of "the painted image of marriage based on romance". For the first time, a real couple is cast in the show. Guest celebrities are invited to be show's commentators for each episode so that they can share their opinions on marriage on behalf of their age group. SG Wannabe's Kim Yong-jun and Hwang Jung-eum also do the interview room together dressed in wedding attire.

However, due to low ratings, the show returned to its old format with the addition of a make-believe couple actor Park Jae-jung and After School member Uee on 2 August 2009. For the Chuseok special, Brown Eyed Girls' Gain & 2AM's Jo Kwon and SG Wannabe's Lee Seok-hoon & host Kim Na-young appeared as two new couples. The episode achieved Season 2's highest rating, and Gain and Jo Kwon were announced to be a permanent couple.

Couple List (New Format)

- SG Wannabe's Kim Yong-jun & Hwang Jung-eum (Ep 56-66)

Couple List (Old Format)

- SG Wannabe's Kim Yong-jun & Hwang Jung-eum (Ep 1-20)
- Park Jae-jung & After School's Uee (Ep 1-20)
- 2AM's Jo Kwon & Brown Eyed Girls' Gain (Ep 21-80)
- SG Wannabe's Lee Seok-hoon & Kim Na-young (Ep 10)
- Lee Seon-ho & Hwang Woo-seul-hye (Ep 21-31)
- CNBLUE's Jung Yong-hwa & Girls' Generation's Seohyun (Ep 29-80)
- 2PM's Nichkhun & f(x)'s Victoria (Ep 41-80)

== Season 3 ==
Season three officially begins on 9 April, with two additional couples upon the departure of Yonghwa & Seohyun, as well as a new format. Park Hwi-sun and K.Will are added for Season 3 to the cast as MCs.

Couple List

- 2PM's Nichkhun & f(x)'s Victoria (Ep 81-105)
- Kim Won-jun & Park So-hyun (Ep 81-117)
- Lee Jang-woo & T-ara's Eunjung (Ep 81-132)
- David Oh & Kwon Ri-se (Ep 92-105)
- Super Junior's Leeteuk & Kang So-ra (Ep 104-132)

== Season 4 ==
Couple List

- Super Junior's Leeteuk & Kang So-ra (Ep 133-134)
- Julien Kang & Yoon Se-ah (Ep 133-159)
- ZE:A's Hwang Kwang-hee & Secret's Han Sun-hwa (Ep 133-166)
- Lee Joon & Oh Yeon-seo (Ep 135-155)
- 2AM's Jeong Jin-woon & Go Joon-hee (Ep 156-186)
- Jo Jung-chi & Choi Jung-in (Ep 160-186)
- SHINee's Taemin & Apink's Son Na-eun (Ep 167-203)
- Yoonhan & Lee So-yeon (Ep 187-213)
- Jung Joon-young & Jeong Yu-mi (Ep 187-222)
- 2PM's Jang Wooyoung & Park Se-young (Ep 204-237)
- Namkoong Min & Hong Jin-young (Ep 214-262)
- Hong Jong-hyun & Girl's Day's Yura (Ep 223-262)
- Song Jae-rim & Kim So-eun (Ep 238-275)
- Super Junior M's Henry Lau & Kim Ye-won (Ep 263-264, 266-275)
- CNBLUE's Lee Jong-hyun & Gong Seung-yeon (Ep 263-286)
- Oh Min-suk & Kang Ye-won (Ep 276-310)
- BtoB's Yook Sung-jae & Red Velvet's Joy (Ep 276-320)
- Kwak Si-yang & Kim So-yeon (Ep 287-316)
- Cho Sae-ho & Fiestar's Cao Lu (Ep 311-314, 316-340)
- Eric Nam & Mamamoo's Solar (Ep 316-348)
- Madtown's Jota & Kim Jin-kyung (Ep 321-350)
- Choi Tae-joon & Apink's Yoon Bo-mi (Ep 341-363)
- Lee Guk-joo & Untouchable's Sleepy (Ep 349-372)
- 5urprise's Gong Myung & Jung Hye-sung (Ep 351-372)
- Choi Min-yong & Jang Do-yeon (Ep 364-373)

== Controversies ==
In late March 2010, MBC stopped broadcast of new episodes due to labour strikes, with repeats airing instead. This event, compounded with the ROKS Cheonan sinking incident, which caused cancellation of most variety shows at the time, resulted in a backlog of footage for the couples Jo Kwon & Gain and Yonghwa & Seohyun. This resulted in the contents of their latest episodes being of footage recorded some months previously, rather than the normal 1–2 weeks of the original.

During Lee Joon & Oh Yeon-seo's season 4 tenure (broadcasting from September 2012 through February 2013), Oh Yeon-seo was observed meeting in public with Lee Jang-woo, her male co-star from the drama series, Here Comes Mr. Oh. When pictures and videos were released in January 2013, media and WGM fans surmised Oh Yeon-seo and Lee Jang-woo, formerly of WGM (Season 3), were in a romantic relationship. Because Oh Yeon-seo and Lee Joon were in the midst of filming WGM at the time this news was released, the integrity of their virtual marriage was questioned by fans. The negative reaction was further exacerbated by Oh Yeon-seo's multiple declarations of romantic interest in Lee Joon (e.g. as her "ideal type" and wanting to meet with him outside of filming). This backlash and perceived broken trust resulted in fans voicing their desire for Oh Yeon-Seo to exit WGM. Shortly after the rumors of Oh Yeon-seo and Lee Jang-woo's relationship surfaced, Lee Joon publicly expressed his frustration about not having his voice heard, with online fans suggesting it was due to his overbearing workload and/or Oh Yeon-seo's alleged relationship with Lee Jang-woo. A few weeks later, Lee Joon and Oh Yeon-seo ended their tenure on WGM.

On March 20, 2015, two new pairings were announced, one of them being Henry Lau and Kim Ye-won. The couple went on to appear in a few episodes. On June 2, it was confirmed that the couple were to leave the show as a video involving actress Lee Tae-im and Kim Ye-won was leaked to the public. In the video, Lee was seen repeatedly cursing at and threatening Kim on the set of MBC's My Tutor Friend. This led to Lee facing severe backlash from the public. She then apologised to Kim and the latter accepted her apology. However, a full video was later revealed, showing Kim being rude to Lee first by not using honorifics, glaring at the senior actress during the outburst and cursing at her after she had left the scene. The public then turned their back towards Kim, cancelling her and calling her behaviour "victim-playing". After the announcement that the Ye-won–Henry couple will be leaving the show, Kim posted an apology on her Twitter. In it, she apologized to Henry, the We Got Married staff, the viewers, the fans and finally to actress Lee Tae-im.

== Spin-offs ==
=== Pit-a-Pat Shake ===
MBC aired a new show based on We Got Married. The emphasis of the show was described as a shift from married life to the dating period. The head producer of Pit-a-Pat Shake was the original producer of We Got Married, when couples such as Seo In-young and Crown J as well as Shin Ae and Alex aired. The success of the earliest and most memorable couples gave people high hopes for the pilot. A Lunar Year Special was filmed and aired as the pilot episode.

The female idols in the spin-off Pit-a-Pat Shake were KARA's Seungyeon, After School's Lizzy, SISTAR's Hyolyn, and SECRET's Sunhwa. Super Junior's Sungmin was partnered with Hyolyn, MBLAQ's Lee Joon with Lizzy, actor Lee Tae-sung with Seungyeon, and comedian Park Heeson with Sunhwa.

=== Chinese version ===
The Chinese version of We Got Married paired Korean and Chinese celebrities. Two out of three pairings were international: T-ara's Hyomin and Super Junior's Kyuhyun. It was produced by MBC to commemorate the twentieth anniversary of South Korea's diplomatic ties with China. It aired as a Valentine's Day special in China on an entertainment channel of Shanghai Media Group and on MBC on 25 February but with only the Korean segments.

Couples

- Hyomin of T-ara & Fu Xinbo of BoBo
- Kyuhyun of Super Junior & Lou Yixiao
- MC Jin Wei & Zhu Chi Dan

=== Global Edition ===
A global edition spin-off in which idol celebrities from Korea, Japan, and Taiwan are paired.

Season 1

Release date: April 7, 2013 – July 14, 2013

- Lee Hong-ki (F.T. Island) & Mina Fujii
- Ok Taec-yeon (2PM) & Emma Wu (Gui Gui)

Season 2

Release date: April 5, 2014 – July 12, 2014

- Heechul (Super Junior) & Puff Kuo (Dream Girls)
- Key (SHINee) & Alissa Yagi

=== We Are In Love ===
The licensed remake of We Got Married titled We Are In Love was broadcast starting on 19 April 2015. It has the same basic format, except that the couples are not 'married' but 'dating'. This change was made in order to present a more realistic story in which couples first must be in love to form the basis of marriage before getting married.

Couples

First season (2015)

- Choi Si-won of Super Junior & Chinese supermodel Liu Wen
- Taiwanese actress Ruby Lin & actor Ren Zhong
- Chinese singer-actor Qiao Renliang & actress Xu Lu

Second season (2016)

- Actress Song Ji-hyo (member of Running Man) & Taiwanese actor Chen Bolin
- Hong Kong actor Shawn Yue and Chinese actress Zhou DongYu
- Chinese actress/singer Li Qin and actor Wei Daxun

== Awards and nominations ==
Year	Award	Category	Recipient	Result
2008	MBC Entertainment Awards	Best Brand Award	We Got Married team	Won
2008	MBC Entertainment Awards	Best Writer	Kang Je-sang	Won
2008	MBC Entertainment Awards	Best Couple Award	Kim Hyun-joong and Hwangbo	Won
2009	MBC Entertainment Awards	Best Newcomer Award	Kim Yong-jun	Won
2009	MBC Entertainment Awards	Best Newcomer Award	Hwang Jung-eum	Won
2009	MBC Entertainment Awards	Best Newcomer Award	Uee	Won
2009	3rd Mnet 20's Choice Awards	Hot Couple Award	Kim Yong-jun and Hwang Jung-eum	Won
2010	MBC Entertainment Awards	Best Couple Award	Jo Kwon and Gain	Won
2010	MBC Entertainment Awards	Best Newcomer Award	Jo Kwon and Gain	Won
2010	MBC Entertainment Awards	Popularity Award	Jung Yong-hwa and Seohyun	Won
2010	MBC Entertainment Awards	Popularity Award	Nichkhun and Victoria	Won
2010	Bugs Music Awards	Best Variety Star (Bronze)	Jo Kwon	Won
2011	MBC Entertainment Awards	Best Newcomer Award	Eunjung	Won
2011	MBC Entertainment Awards	Best Newcomer Award	Lee Jang-woo	Nominated
2011	MBC Entertainment Awards	Excellence Award	Park So-hyun	Won
2011	MBC Entertainment Awards	Best MC Award	Park Mi-sun	Won
2012	MBC Entertainment Awards	Popularity Award	Kang So-ra and Leeteuk	Won
2012	MBC Entertainment Awards	Best Newcomer Award	Hwang Kwanghee	Won
2012	MBC Entertainment Awards	Best Newcomer Award	Yoon Se-ah	Won
2012	MBC Entertainment Awards	Best Couple Award	Julien Kang and Yoon Se-ah	Nominated
2012	MBC Entertainment Awards	Best Couple Award	Hwang Kwanghee and Han Sun-hwa	Nominated
2012	MBC Entertainment Awards	Best Couple Award	Lee Joon and Oh Yeon-seo	Nominated
2013	MBC Entertainment Awards	Best Newcomer Award	Jeong Yu-mi	Won
2013	MBC Entertainment Awards	Star of the Year	Taemin	Won
2013	MBC Entertainment Awards	Star of the Year	Son Na-eun	Won
2013	MBC Entertainment Awards	Star of the Year	Yoonhan	Won
2013	MBC Entertainment Awards	Star of the Year	Jung Joon-young	Won
2013	MBC Entertainment Awards	Excellence Award	Lee So-yeon	Won
2013	MBC Entertainment Awards	Best Couple Award	Lee Tae-min and Son Na-eun	Nominated
2014	MBC Entertainment Awards	Best Couple Award	Hong Jong-hyun and Yura	Nominated
2014	MBC Entertainment Awards	Best Couple Award	Namkoong Min and Hong Jin-young	Nominated
2014	MBC Entertainment Awards	Best Couple Award	Song Jae-rim and Kim So-eun	Won
2014	MBC Entertainment Awards	New Star Award	Namkoong Min	Won
2014	MBC Entertainment Awards	New Star Award	Hong Jong-hyun	Won
2014	MBC Entertainment Awards	New Star Award	Kim So-eun	Won
2014	MBC Entertainment Awards	Best Newcomer Award	Kim So-eun	Nominated
2014	MBC Entertainment Awards	Best Newcomer Award	Song Jae-rim	Won
2014	MBC Entertainment Awards	Best Newcomer Award	Yura	Won
2014	MBC Entertainment Awards	Excellence Award	Hong Jin-young	Won
2015	MBC Entertainment Awards	New Star Award	Kwak Si-yang	Won
2015	MBC Entertainment Awards	New Star Award	Joy	Won
2015	MBC Entertainment Awards	New Star Award	Park Cho-a	Won
2015	MBC Entertainment Awards	Popularity Award for Variety Show	Oh Min-suk and Kang Ye-won	Won
2015	MBC Entertainment Awards	Best Rookie Award	Kwak Si-yang	Nominated
2015	MBC Entertainment Awards	Best Rookie Award	Oh Min-suk	Nominated
2015	MBC Entertainment Awards	Best Rookie Award	Yook Sung-jae	Won
2015	MBC Entertainment Awards	Best Couple Award	Kwak Si-yang and Kim So-yeon	Nominated
2015	MBC Entertainment Awards	Best Couple Award	Oh Min-suk and Kang Ye-won	Nominated
2015	MBC Entertainment Awards	Best Couple Award	Yook Sung-jae and Joy	Won
2015	MBC Entertainment Awards	Top Excellence Award for Variety Show	Kang Ye-won	Nominated
2015	MBC Entertainment Awards	Top Excellence Award for Variety Show	Kim So-yeon	Won
2016	16th MBC Entertainment Awards	Program of the Year	We Got Married Season 4	Nominated
2016	16th MBC Entertainment Awards	Top Female Excellence Award in Variety Show	Lee Guk-joo	Won
2016	16th MBC Entertainment Awards	Male Excellence Award in Variety Show	Sleepy	Nominated
2016	16th MBC Entertainment Awards	Female Excellence Award in Variety Show	Park Na-rae	Won
2016	16th MBC Entertainment Awards	Female Excellence Award in Variety Show	Cao Lu	Nominated
2016	16th MBC Entertainment Awards	Male Rookie Award in Variety Show	Yang Se-chan	Nominated
2016	16th MBC Entertainment Awards	Female Rookie Award in Variety Show	Kim Jin-kyung	Nominated
2016	16th MBC Entertainment Awards	Female Rookie Award in Variety Show	Solar	Nominated
2016	16th MBC Entertainment Awards	Popularity Award	Jo Se-ho and Cao Lu	Won
2016	16th MBC Entertainment Awards	Best Couple Award	Eric Nam and Solar	Won
2016	16th MBC Entertainment Awards	Best Couple Award	Choi Tae-joon and Yoon Bo-mi	Nominated
2016	16th MBC Entertainment Awards	Best Couple Award	Jo Se-ho and Cao Lu	Nominated
2016	16th MBC Entertainment Awards	Best Couple Award	Jota and Kim Jin-kyung	Nominated
2016	16th MBC Entertainment Awards	Best Couple Award	Sleepy and Lee Guk-joo	Nominated
2017	17th MBC Entertainment Awards	Top Excellence Award, Variety Category	Lee Guk-joo	Nominated
