= Jenny, Juno =

- Theatrical poster
- Directed by: Kim Ho-jun
- Written by: Kim Ho-jun
- Produced by: Choi Sun-sik; Park Seong-chan; Lee Jae-hyeok
- Starring: Park Min-ji; Kim Hye-seong
- Cinematography: Kim Dong-cheon
- Edited by: Park Soon-duk
- Music by: Choi Man-sik; Choi Sun-sik
- Distributed by: Show East
- Release date: 18 February 2005
- Running time: 108 minutes
- Country: South Korea
- Language: Korean
- Box office: US$1,575,871

Jenny, Juno is a 2005 South Korean romance film written and directed by Kim Ho-jun. It was released in South Korea on February 18, 2005, and pulled in a total of 289,829 admissions.

== Plot ==
The plot centers around the relationship of a 15-year-old couple, Jenny (Park Min-ji) and Juno (Kim Hye-sung), who meet in school. Jenny is a smart, bright and pretty girl. Juno is cute, cool and good at sports, and just got transferred from another school. When Jenny discovers that she is pregnant, she and Juno decide against having an abortion, opting for parenthood instead.

Juno starts delivering newspapers to earn additional money to buy the food that Jenny desires. Juno strives to carry out the duties of a good father, and always stays at Jenny's side, taking care of Jenny's nutrition for the sake of their baby. Jenny becomes jealous due to her condition and gets into a mishap with Pyoy, a girl trying to flirt with Juno. Juno breaks up the fight and asks Jenny to never do that again, because of his worry for their baby.

The couple go to places for pregnant women, practise an exercise for pregnant mothers and spend their time together at school and outside. They go out one day a date and take a boat out on a lake, but the ropes that bound the boat are lost and they are left stranded. They try to seek help but there is no mobile phone connection. They wait there until midnight, when a fisherman arrives and sends both of them back home. Jenny gets scolded by her mother for returning late.

The couple try to conceal the pregnancy from their families for as long as possible, but the truth is revealed eventually when Jenny's middle sister finds out about her pregnancy. Jenny and Juno tell their parents about her pregnancy, but the parents do not approve. Jenny is scheduled to be sent to the United States where her eldest sister lives, but her parents refuse to allow the two to meet anymore.

The two get married later in the month, with the assistance of their classmates. One day, Juno's friend tells him that Jenny is confirmed to be sent to the United States. None of them however can reach her. Juno keeps waiting in front of Jenny's home to meet her but her mother and sister keep avoiding him. Juno then follows Jenny's sister, and because she cannot bear his sadness, she tells him that Jenny was in the mansion.

When Juno finds her, Jenny's water breaks and she is then rushed to the hospital, and gives birth to a boy. In the last scene, Jenny is pushing Juno to study hard so that he can get a place in a top university. Their son is cared for by Jenny's mother while the couple study.

== Cast ==
- Park Min-ji as Jae-In "Jenny"
- Kim Hye-seong as Juno
- Im Dong-jin as Jenny's father
- Kim Ja-ok as Jenny's mother
- Seo Min-jung as Jenny's sister
- Kang Nam-gil as Juno's father
- Lee Eung-kyung as Juno's mother
- Ahn Sun-young as Sex education teacher
- Shim Eun-jin as Hye-rin
- Jung Ji-ahn as Mi-ji

== Soundtrack ==
1. Saranghalkoya - Park Hye-kyung
2. raingeurigi
3. hoisang 1
4. haengjingok
5. gwaepgwaepsong
6. daemunap
7. naega malhaetjana
8. hoisang 2
9. antena
10. sanbuingwa gyeonhak
11. boyak humchyeomeokgi
12. bioneun daemun ap
13. seutoking haengjingok
14. uulpiano
15. olchaengi akapelra
16. juchajangeseo
17. gamgiyakdeonjigi
18. uulpiano 2
19. uulpiano 3
20. uimunui sanai
21. dangshineun sarangbadgi wihae taeeonan saram
22. sarangeulhalkkeoya-indi
23. saranghalgeoya

== Controversies ==
The film's subject matter provoked intense discussion in the media upon its release in South Korea. Although there is no sex scene between the protagonists, the film was initially given a rating of 18+, but this was lowered to 15+ upon appeal. Critics expressed concerns that the film's presentation of teenage pregnancy was unrealistic, in that Jenny is from a well-to-do, secure family that is able to support her decision, and that this might send the wrong message to less fortunate teens. Kim Ho-jun, the film's director, responded to this criticism by stating:

Jenny and Juno are certainly wayward children who should have never done a thing they did for their age. But it was an accident that they made the mistake and their love is in a way innocent. What should be really criticized is not the couple but adults who only say 'no.' This film shows how they make a mistake but how we should take responsibility.

== Similarities to Juno ==
There are several similarities of Jenny, Juno to the 2007 American comedy film Juno, which also deals with teenage pregnancy and features a character with the name Juno (Jenny's boyfriend). The film's screenwriter, Diablo Cody, commented on the coincidence in October 2007, stating that she had been unaware of the existence of Jenny, Juno prior to her own film's release. She said that, although she had not previously watched Jenny, Juno, she is now interested in seeing it.
