= Kim Hye-seong (actor) =

South Korean actor and model

Kim Hye-sung
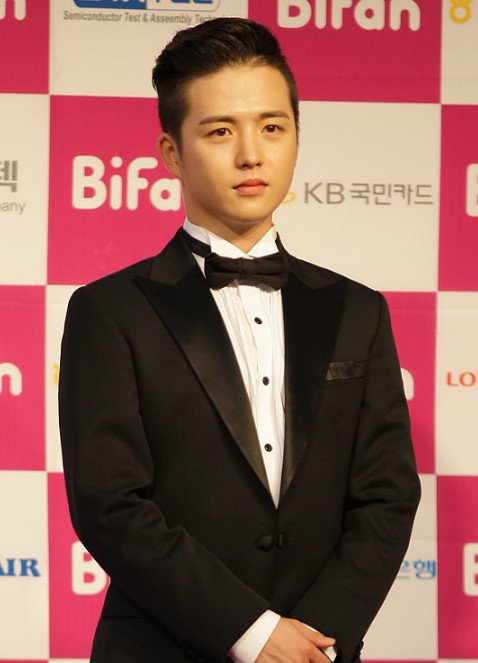
- Kim in July 2015
- Born: January 14, 1988 (age 38), South Korea
- Occupations: Actor; model
- Years active: 2004–present
- Agent: Namoo Actors
- Height: 1.72 m (5 ft 7 1/2 in)

Korean name
- Hangul: 김혜성
- Hanja: 金慧星
- RR: Gim Hyeseong
- MR: Kim Hyesŏng

Kim Hye-sung (Korean: 김혜성; also spelt Kim Hye-seong; born January 14, 1988) is a South Korean actor and model.

== Biography ==
Kim is a South Korean actor under Namoo Actors. In March 2012, Kim Hye-sung enlisted for his mandatory military service at the 306 Reserve in Uijeongbu, Gyeonggi Province and was discharged in March 2013. He is popular and well known for his leading role as Juno in Jenny, Juno (2006).

== Filmography ==
=== Film ===
Year	Title	Role	Notes
2005	Jenny, Juno	Juno	Lead role
2006	Gangster High	Choi Kyung-chol	Supporting role
2008	Boy Meets Boy	Min-soo	Lead role
2010	71: Into the Fire	Yong-man	Supporting role
2011	Glove	Jang Dae-gun	Supporting role
2015	The Chosen: Forbidden Cave	Ji-kwang	Supporting role

=== Television ===
Year	Title	Role	Notes
2006–07	High Kick!	Lee Min-ho	Lead role
2006	Golden Fishery	Main Panel	
2007–08	Boys & Girls Music Countdown	Co-host	Alongside Tiffany
2008–09	The Kingdom of the Winds	Prince Yeo-jin	Supporting role
2009	High Kick Through the Roof	Lee Min-ho	Cameo, episode 1
2013	Law of the Jungle in the Himalayas	Himself	Reality show
2014	Potato Star 2013QR3	Himself	Sitcom, Cameo, Episode 100
2017	Distorted	Song Tae-joon	Supporting role
2017	Radio Star	Himself	Episode 508
2017	Mad Dog	Ohn Nu-ri	Supporting role
