= High Kick! =

South Korean situation comedy

- Promotional poster
- Hangul: 거침없이 하이킥
- RR: Geochimeopsi haikik
- MR: Kŏch'imŏpsi haik'ik
- Genre: Situation comedy
- Created by: Kim Byeong-wook
- Written by: Song Jae-jeong; Lee Young-chul; Lee So-jeong; Choi Jeong-hyeon; Bang Bong-won
- Directed by: Kim Byeong-wook; Kim Chang-dong; Kim Young-ki
- Starring: Lee Soon-jae; Na Moon-hee; Jeong Jun-ha; Choi Min-yong; Park Hae-mi; Shin Ji; Kim Hye-seong; Jung Il-woo; Seo Min-jung; Park Min-young; Kim Bum
- Opening theme: "Unstoppable High Kick" by Moogadang
- Country of origin: South Korea
- Original language: Korean
- No. of seasons: 1
- No. of episodes: 167

Production
- Executive producers: Chung Eui-chan; Jeong Wang-gyo
- Producers: Kim Ki-bum; Kim Gwan-gil; Jung Yong-wook; Kim Young-gyu
- Running time: 30 minutes
- Production company: Chorokbaem Media

Original release
- Network: MBC TV
- Release: November 6, 2006 – July 13, 2007

Related
- High Kick Through the Roof; High Kick: Revenge of the Short Legged

High Kick! (Korean: 거침없이 하이킥; lit. 'High Kick without Hesitation; Unstoppable High Kick') was a South Korean situation comedy revolving around the life of the Lee family. It aired in South Korea from Monday through Friday, in sitcom format.

The show led to the sequels High Kick Through the Roof, which aired in 2009–2010, and High Kick: Revenge of the Short Legged, which aired in 2011–2012.

== Characters ==
There's a fact that almost all of the character's name is their actor/actress real name - some of the characters just change their last name.

=== Main ===
- Lee Soon-jae as Lee Soon-jae, the head of the Lee family, who works alongside his daughter-in-law at his Korean medicine hospital. He graduated Medical school and read Acupuncture and Moxibustion as specialties. The oldest in the family, he can be strict and aggressive toward his family members, and thinks only about himself. In flashback scene, He used to be Moon-hee's master
  - Lee Tae-ri (Note: Credited as Lee Min-ho.) as young Lee Soon-jae
- Na Moon-hee as Na Moon-hee, Soon-jae's wife. She does all of the cooking and cleaning, and looks after Joon (Min-yong's baby). In flashback scene, she used to serve Sunjae's family as maid
- Jeong Jun-ha as Lee Jun-ha, son of Soon-jae and Moon-hee, a huge man with an enormous appetite. Laid off from his job, he spends his time at home as an unsuccessful investor and depends on the earnings of his wife, who is the main doctor at his father's hospital.
- Choi Min-yong as Lee Min-yong, the late-born son of Soon-jae and Moon-hee, who graduated Normal College and became PE teacher at Pungpa High School where his nephews attend. Returning to his parents house after a short-lived marriage with Shin Ji, he lives in an expanded and modified storeroom upstairs, which is connected with the main house with a firemen's pole.
- Park Hae-mi as Park Hae-mi, the wife of Lee Joon-ha, she is a Traditional Korean Medicine doctor that works with Lee Soon-jae. In flashback she married Lee Junha to seek revenge after her breakup with her boyfriend.
- Kim Hye-seong as Lee Min-ho, the eldest and smart son of Lee Joon-ha and Park Hae-mi.
- Jung Il-woo as Lee Yoon-ho, the youngest son of Lee Joon-ha and Park Hae-mi, who narrates the story of the show.
- Shin Ji as Shin Ji a.k.a. Shin Bong-hee, an unemployed small-time singer. Lee Min-yong's former wife and the mother of Joon who wants to study music in Russia but was conned. She and Hae-mi are not in good terms.
- Seo Min-jung as Seo Min-jung, a clumsy English teacher at Pungpa High School, and the homeroom teacher of Min-ho, Yoon-ho, Bum, Chan-sung and Seung-hyun. She rented the apartment that Min-yong and Shin Ji used to live in, and lives there with Shin Ji after her return from the short and unsuccessful attempt to study in Moscow.
- Kim Bum as Kim Bum, Lee Min-ho's best friend, who desires to become a member of the family.
- Park Min-young as Kang Yoo-mi, an unintelligent girlfriend of Lee Min-Ho, daughter of Hae-mi's friend.

=== Minor ===
- Lee Su-na as Lee Su-na a.k.a. Gaeseong-daek and Lee Yu-na, Na Moon-hee's best friend, currently in prison for murdering her sister.
- Yeom Seung-hyun as Yeom Seung-hyun, another classmate of Min-ho and Yoon-ho, and the rival of Yoon-ho.
- Hwang Chan-sung as Hwang Chan-sung, Yum Seung-hyun's friend and one of Yoon-ho's rivals. He later befriends Yunho.
- Go Chae-min as Lee Jun, Min-yong and Shin Ji's infant child.
- Na Hye-mi as Na Hye-mi, a classmate of Yoo-mi, transferred from a different school in later episodes.
- Jeong Shin-woo as Nurse Yu
- Park Seung-chan as Nurse Park
- Hong Sun-chang as Hong Sun-chang, the sarcastic Vice Principal of Pungpa High School.
- Yoon Seo-hyun as Lee Seo-hyun, a detective.
- Roh Joo-hyun as Seo Joo-hyun, Seo Min-jung's father.
- Seo Hyun as Han Young-min, a member of the staff in a musical Shin Ji played in.
- Jo Yeon-hee as Yoga instructor
- Clara Lee (Note: Credited as Lee Sung-min.) as Kim Yoon-joo (ep. 64)
- Park Chanyeol as High school student (ep. 71)
- Jo Young-min as Yoon-ho
- Kim Hee-jung as Min-ho's crush (ep. 164)

== Original soundtrack ==
Part 1

1. Unstoppable High Kick - Moogadang
2. Love U Like U - Moogadang
3. Why Is It - Moogadang
4. Sambuja Song - Moogadang

Part 2

1. Love to Ride - Lee Gyeong-mi
2. In Place - Lee Eun-ju

Special edition

1. Love to Ride (Full Ver) - Lee Gyeong-mi

== Ratings ==
The series was a significant commercial success for MBC. Despite starting with a modest viewership of approximately 7.4%, the show's ratings saw a steady increase, eventually surpassing the 20% threshold in January 2007. It eventually reached a peak rating of 24.2% in February 2007.

== Legacy and impact ==
The series is credited with single-handedly revitalizing the South Korean sitcom genre, which had been in a state of stagnation following the conclusion of the Nonstop series. The "High Kick" became a significant brand for MBC, leading to two sequels: High Kick Through the Roof (2009) and High Kick: Revenge of the Short Legged (2011).

== International broadcast ==
- It aired in Japan on cable channel KNTV from May 21, 2007, to January 8, 2008.
- It aired in Vietnam on HTV3 called Gia đình là số 1 (lit. 'Family is Number 1') from November 11, 2009.
- It aired in the Philippines on TV5 beginning April 5, 2010. Chicosci song Diamond Shotgun was used as the theme song of the series.

== Adaptation ==
- In Vietnam, the series was adapted by Điền Quân Media & Entertainment to be produced in 2016. The first episode was on air on every Monday through Thursday, beginning from January 18, 2017.

== Reunion ==
On October 29, 2021, the MBC documentary program Docuflex released a two-part special titled "Youth Documentary High Kick!". The episodes reunited the cast of the sitcom to celebrate its 15th anniversary. The cast members returned to the original set and shared their memories and experiences from the show.
