= Yoonhan =

South Korean pianist (born 1983)

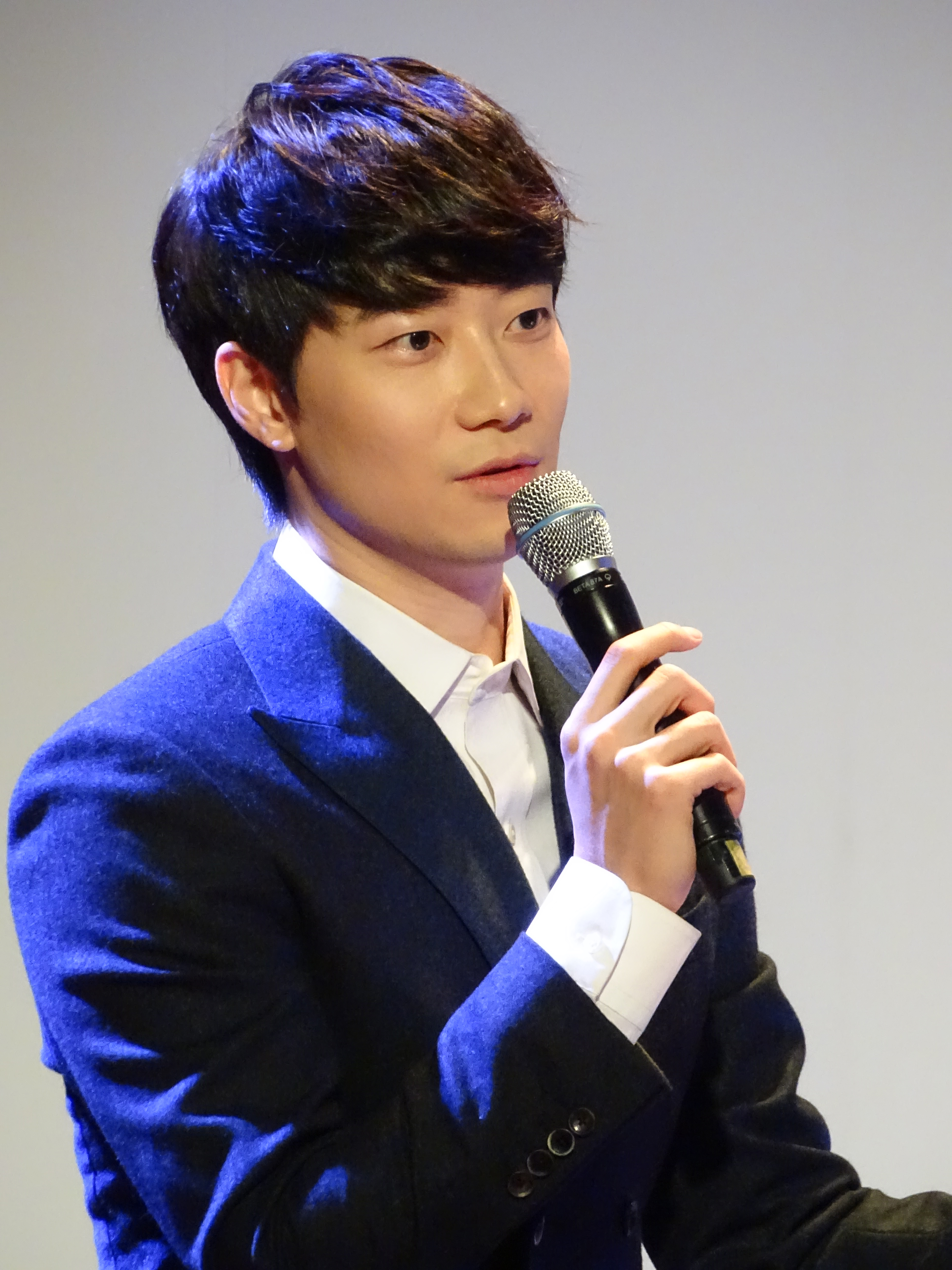
- Yoonhan in 2014
- Born: 전윤한, 田潤翰; October 14, 1983 (age 43); Daechi-dong, Gangnam District, Seoul, South Korea
- Occupations: Singer, Pianist, Professor
- Spouse: Jeon Min-jeong (m. 2017)
- Children: 3
- Musical career
- Labels: Grit Music International, Universal Music

Korean name
- Hangul: 전윤한
- RR: Jeon Yunhan
- MR: Chŏn Yunhan

Jeon Yoon-han (Korean: 전윤한; born October 14, 1983), better known mononymously known as Yoonhan, is a South Korean pianist and singer. He was a cast member in the variety show We Got Married.

== Personal life ==
Jeon married his younger girlfriend in September 2017 and the couple welcomed their first child, a daughter, on May 23, 2020. On May 27, 2024, Jeon's wife gave birth to twin daughters.

== Variety show ==
Year	Title	Role	Note
2013–2014	We Got Married	Cast member	Episode 55-81 (paired with Lee So-yeon)
2015	King of Mask Singer	Contestant	Episode 37 (with the stage name "Good Friend Santa Claus")

== Awards and nominations ==
Year	Award	Category	Nominated work	Result
2013	MBC Entertainment Awards	Star of the Year	We Got Married	Won
2014	MBC Entertainment Awards	Star of the Year	We Got Married	Won
