= Kim Jin-woo (musician) =

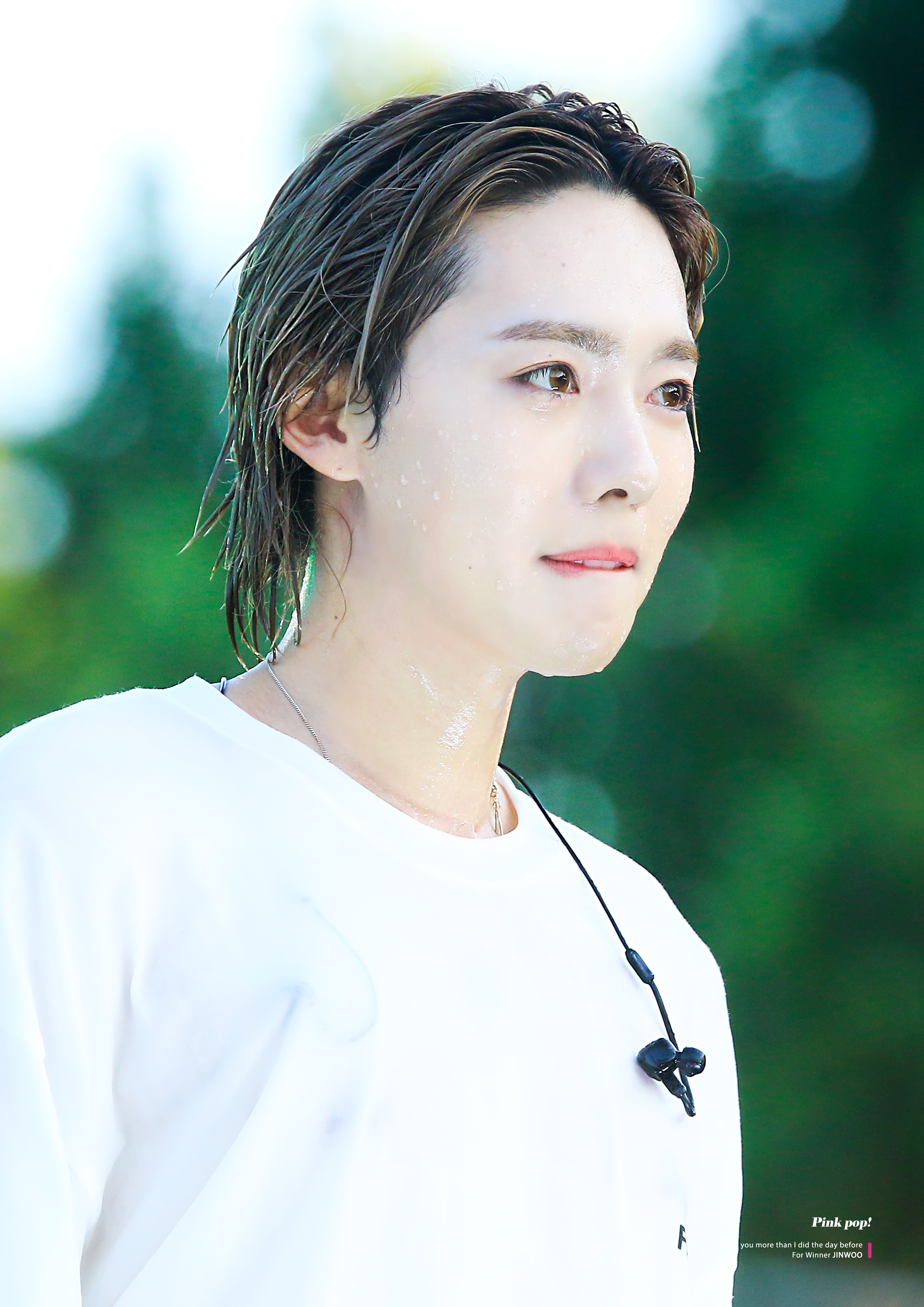
- Kim at the Waterbomb Festival 2018
- Born: September 26, 1991 (age 35); Imja Island, Sinan County, South Jeolla, South Korea
- Occupations: Singer; actor
- Years active: 2014–present
- Musical career
- Genres: K-pop; dance
- Instrument: Vocals
- Label: YG
- Member of: Winner; YG Family

Korean name
- Hangul: 김진우
- Hanja: 金秦禹
- RR: Gim Jinu
- MR: Kim Chinu

Kim Jin-woo (Korean: 김진우; born September 26, 1991), also known mononymously as Jinu, is a South Korean singer, actor and member of Winner under YG Entertainment. The band debuted on August 12, 2014, with the full-length album entitled 2014 S/S. Kim also debuted as a soloist on August 14, 2019, with the single album titled Jinu's Heyday.

== Life and career ==
=== 1991–2012: Early life ===
Kim Jin-woo was born on September 26, 1991, in Imja Island, Sinan County, South Jeolla, South Korea, and resided in Mokpo since the age of seven (Korean age) with his family of which he is a middle child of amid two sisters. Kim was raised by his grandmother for most of his childhood and adolescence and whom he felt most attached to amongst members of his family. His father was often found absent within the household due to his line of business in fisheries as the captain of a fishing boat and its cycle of sailing for three or six month intervals before his return. He and his younger sister of eight years, were also distant by his truancy from each others lives.

In the midst of his senior year of high school his curiosity and admiration for the late veteran actress Choi Jin-sil stemmed an interest for acting which led the 19-year-old (Korean age) to join an acting institute in Mokpo. Kim soon enrolled for its vocal and dance lessons and learned all of its branches were owned by Seungri of Big Bang – notable attendees include BTS' J-Hope and Mijoo of Lovelyz. Kim was scouted by the celebrity and travelled to Seoul to attend a private audition for YG Entertainment with his referral and waited six months before his recruitment into its trainee program in August 2010. Ahead of his acceptance, he had previously auditioned for a large-scale company besides YG Entertainment but did not pass and also declined an offer to join a different agency through casting.

=== 2013–present: Debut with Winner and solo debut ===
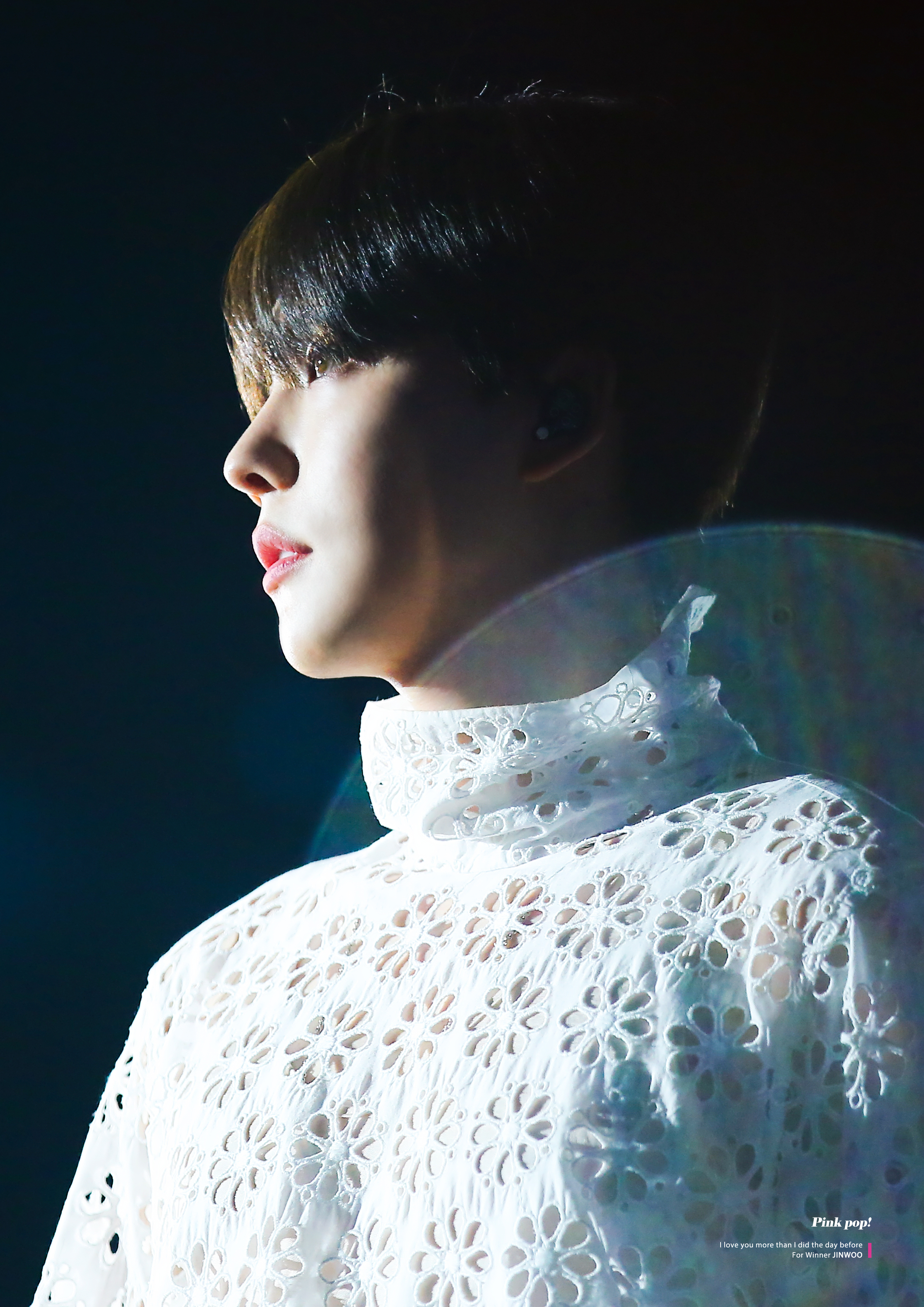
Kim performing in Hong Kong in November 2018

In his training period, Kim served as a backup dancer for the 2011 YG Family Concert and was urged by CEO Yang Hyun-suk to receive rap lessons for three months to boost his confidence. Kim participated as a contestant for WIN: Who is Next? (2013) which involved two assembles consisting of male trainees under YG Entertainment (A and B) who would battle for the chance to debut by series end after embarking on a one-hundred day journey. He was placed as the eldest and longest trained member of "Team A" with Lee Seung-hoon, Song Min-ho, Kang Seung-yoon and Nam Tae-hyun. In the last episode, Team A had won the show and would debut under the name "Winner". Kim ended his four year training period with his official debut with the five-piece band on August 17, 2014, and the studio album entitled 2014 S/S. The band's success upon debut was recorded as "unprecedented" by Korean media outlets and were dubbed as "monster rookies".

Kim made his acting debut through the web drama Magic Cellphone (2016) followed Love For A Thousand More (2016) with band-mate Kang Seung-yoon. The latter series exceeded 5 million views as of December 2016 and was cited a success.

In November 2016, Kim joined as the lead role for the production The Little Prince by the Korea National Contemporary Dance Company. Artistic director and choreographer Ahn Ae-soon stated he was cast as his image befitted the role of his character and noticed his passion for dance. Kim cited the experience "healed" him and changed the way he thought about dancing. He credits it helped his career in music and learned modern dance was about dancing to your natural rhythm and dancing to the beat of your own drum is always right. Kim became the first K-pop idol to take part of a contemporary dance production.

Kim and his first role as part of a regular cast for Wizard of Nowhere (2017–2018) earned him a nomination for the "Rookie Award" at the 2017 MBC Entertainment Awards. His credits in entertainment further included Live a Good Life (2018) with label-mates Kwon Hyun-bin and Yoo Byung-jae, Legendary Big Fish (2019) and Scene's Quiz (2019).

Kim debuted as a soloist on August 14 with the single album Jinu's Heyday (2019) after five years into his career within the music industry ahead of his mandatory military service. Its lead single "Call Anytime" (또또또; ttottotto) was featured and co-written by his band-mate Mino. His first music show broadcast was aired on Show! Music Core on August 17 which also marked his band's debut anniversary.

== Personal life ==
=== Military service ===
As part of his mandatory military service, Kim enlisted as a public service worker on April 2, 2020, and served his training at the Nonsan Army Training Center for four weeks prior to fulfilling his military duty as a public service worker. Kim was discharged from military service on December 31, 2021.

== Public image ==
Kim is well known in South Korea for his visuals, in which he was placed second for male idol with perfect facial ratios.

== Other ventures ==
=== Philanthropy ===
In 2018, Kim Jinwoo participated in Ice Bucket Challenge to raise money and awareness for ALS patients.

On April 6, 2019, it was reported by an official that Kim quietly made a donation of 10 million Won to the Hope Bridge Association of the National Disaster Relief for the victims of the Gangwon Province wildfire in South Korea. On September 18, Kim reportedly donated 10 million Won in support to help the victims who have suffered from the natural disaster, Typhoon Lingling.

During promotion of his solo debut, Kim collaborated with Naver Happy Bean Campaign which aims to raise fund and support to build a shelter/center for abandoned and neglected animals.

On March 1, 2020, Kim gave a donation of 10 million Won to the Hope Bridge Association to help those affected by the coronavirus pandemic. On August 13, 2020, it was reported that Kim has donated 10 million Won to the Hope Bridge National Disaster Relief Association for the flood victims who were affected by the heavy rain in Korea, showing his unstoppable good deeds despite currently serving in the military.

On August 10, 2022, Kim donated ₩10 million to help those affected by the 2022 South Korean floods through the Hope Bridge Korea Disaster Relief Association.

On February 8, 2023, Kim donated 10 million won to help 2023 Turkey–Syria earthquake, by donating money through Hope Bridge National Disaster Relief Association.

== Discography ==
=== Single albums ===
Title	Details	Peak positions	Sales
Title	Details	KOR	Sales
Jinu's Heyday	Released: August 14, 2019; Label: YG Entertainment; Formats: CD, digital download	2	KOR: 51,396

=== As a lead artist ===
Title	Year	Peak positions		Album
Title	Year	KOR	US World	Album
"Call Anytime" (또또또) (featuring Mino)	2019	127	14	Jinu's Heyday

== Videography ==
=== Music video ===
Year	Title	Director(s)	Length	Ref.
2019	"Call Anytime" (또또또)	Kwon Yong-soo	3:46	

== Filmography ==
=== Movies ===
Year	Title		Role	Ref.
Year	English	Korean	Role	Ref.
2024	Commission	커미션	tba	

=== Television series ===
Year	Title		Role	Ref.
Year	English	Korean	Role	Ref.
2023	My Lovely Boxer	순정복서	Han Jae-min	

=== Web series ===
Year	Title		Role	Ref.
Year	English	Korean	Role	Ref.
2016	Magic Cellphone	마법의 핸드폰	Oh Tae-ji	
2016	Love for a Thousand More	천년째 연애중	Hyung-sik	

=== Television shows ===
Year	Title		Role	Notes	Ref.
Year	English	Korean	Role	Notes	Ref.
2013	WIN: Who Is Next	윈: 후 이즈 넥스트	Contestant	Team A member	
2017	Wizard of Nowhere	오지의 마법사	Regular Cast	Episodes 5–29	
2018	Live a Nice Life	착하게 살자	Regular Cast		
2019	Legendary Big Fish	전설의 빅피쉬	Regular Cast		
2019	Scene's Quiz	씬의 퀴즈	Regular Cast		
2022	DNA Mate	호적메이트	Cast member	Episodes 3–4, 29	
2023	Heart Signal	하트시그널	Panelist	Season 4	

=== Web show ===
Year	Title		Role	Notes	Ref.
Year	English	Korean	Role	Notes	Ref.
2022	Saturday Night Live Korea	SNL 코리아2	Host	Season 2 – Episode 12	
2022	Some-ping	썸핑	Host		
2023	Dingdae	딩대 5	Host	Season 5	

=== Stage production ===
Year	Production	Company	Role	Ref.
2016	The Little Prince (어린 왕자)	Korea National Contemporary Dance Company	The Little Prince	

== Awards and nominations ==
Name of the award ceremony, year presented, award category, nominee(s) of the award, and the result of the nomination
Award ceremony	Year	Category	Nominee(s) / work(s)	Result	Ref.
MBC Entertainment Awards	2017	Rookie Award in Variety Category	Kim Jin-woo	Nominated	
