= Yura (South Korean singer) =

South Korean actress and singer (born 1992)

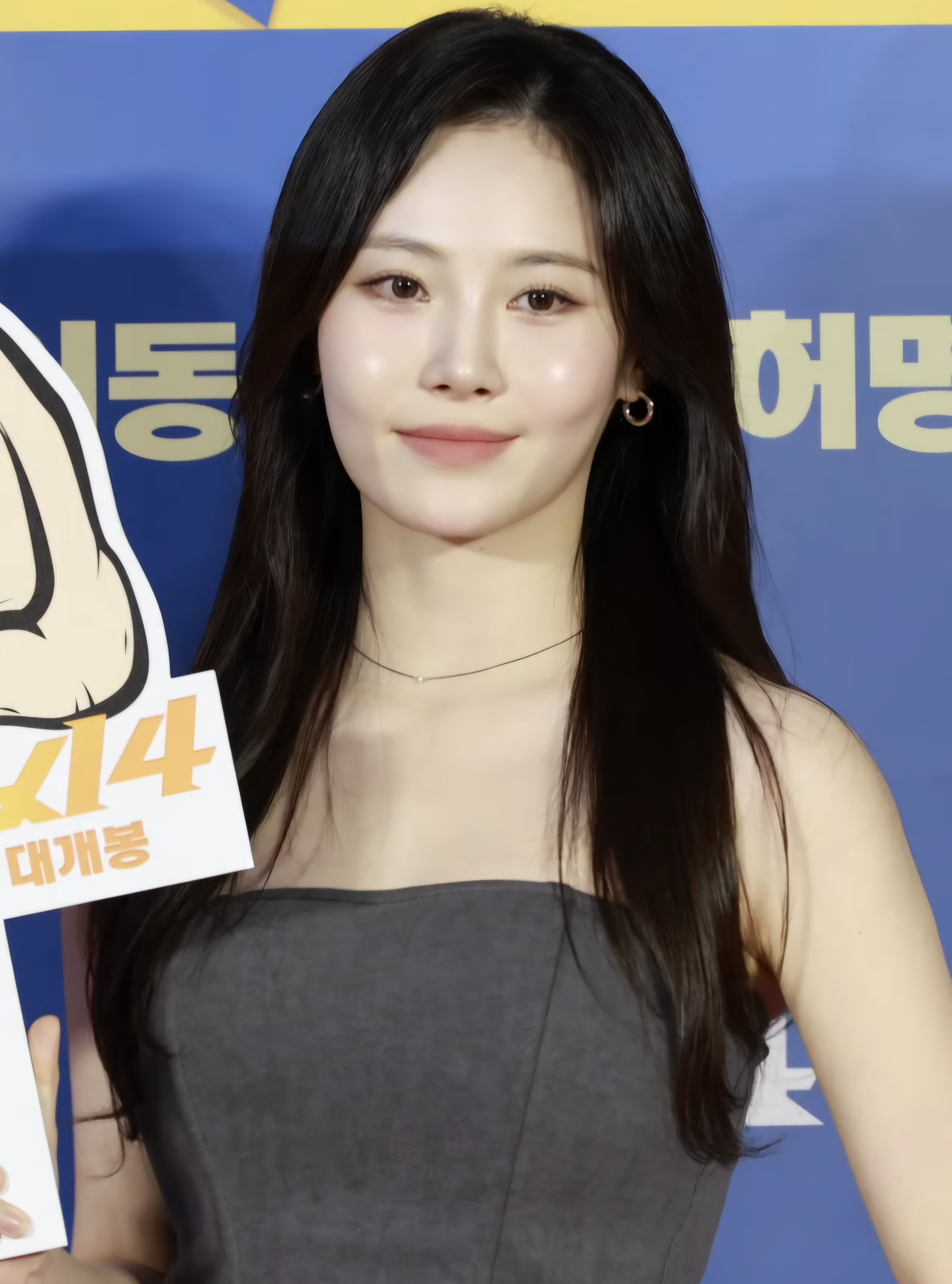
- Yura in April 2024
- Born: Kim Ah-young; November 6, 1992 (age 33); Ulsan, South Korea
- Education: Dongduk Women's University
- Occupations: Actress; singer
- Years active: 2010–present
- Agent: Awesome ENT
- Awards: Full list
- Musical career
- Genre: K-pop
- Instrument: Vocals
- Label: Dream T
- Member of: Girl's Day

Korean name
- Hangul: 김아영
- Hanja: 金亞瑩
- RR: Gim Ayeong
- MR: Kim Ayŏng

Stage name
- Hangul: 유라
- RR: Yura
- MR: Yura

Signature
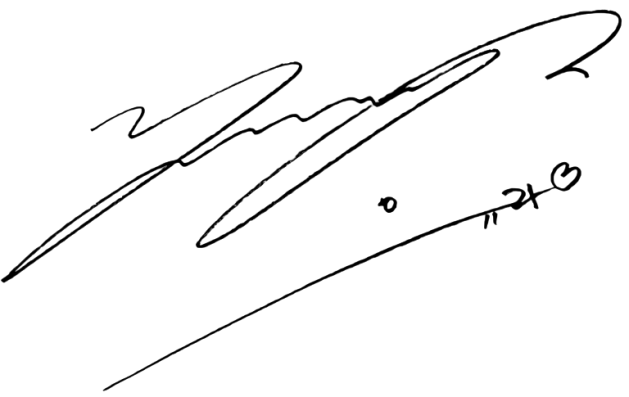

Kim Ah-young (Korean: 김아영; born November 6, 1992), known professionally as Yura (Korean: 유라), is a South Korean actress and singer. She is best known as a member of the South Korean girl group Girl's Day. She has since ventured into acting and has starred in television series Radio Romance (2018), Now, We Are Breaking Up (2021–2022), and Forecasting Love and Weather (2022).

== Early life and education ==
Yura was born on November 6, 1992, in Ulsan, South Korea. She attended Ulsan Art High School as a dance major before graduating from Dongduk Women's University, with a bachelor's degree from the Department of Broadcasting and Entertainment.

== Career ==
=== 2010–2014: Girl's Day ===
In 2010, Yura became a member of the K-pop girl group Girl's Day, where she and Lee Hye-ri replaced two of the former members, Ji-in and Ji-sun, who left after having been with the group for two months.

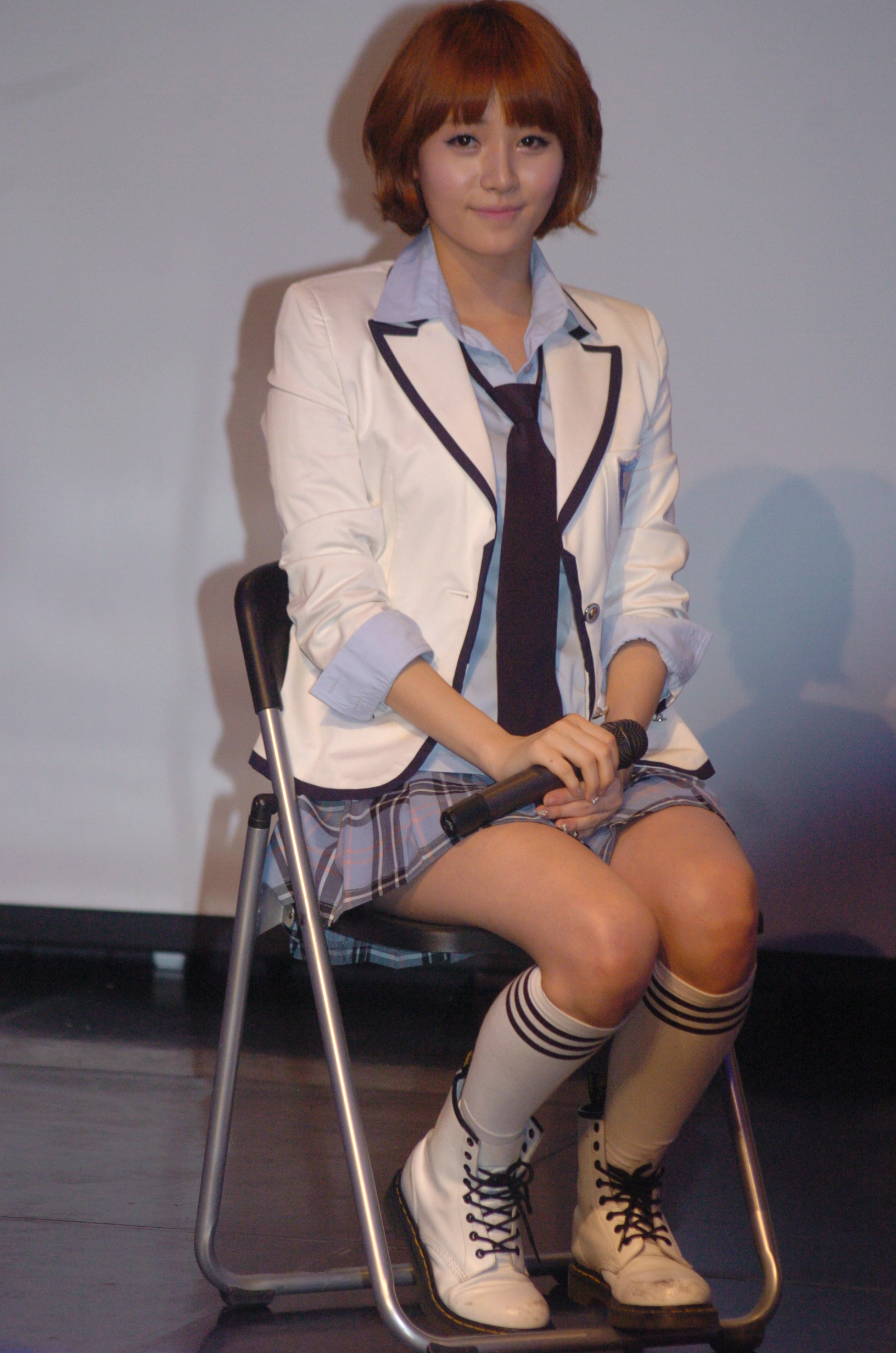
Yura in 2012

In 2012, Yura made her acting debut through Sohu TV's Chinese drama Secret Angel. She then collaborated with her label-mate Jevice with their single "I'll Love You". Yura also featured in SBS's series To the Beautiful You.

In 2013, Yura was cast in the sitcom Reckless Family 3. She also featured in a special episode of KBS' night show The Clinic for Married Couples: Love and War 2.

In 2014, Yura starred in the SBS mini drama Be Arrogant. She then became one of the official couples for the variety show We Got Married, where she was paired with model-actor Hong Jong-hyun.

=== 2015–present: Solo activities ===
In 2015, Yura co-hosted the fourth season of reality competition series K-pop Star alongside Jun Hyun-moo. Additionally, Yura also served as the MC for joint Korean-Chinese audition program Super Idol.

In 2016, Yura was cast as one of the new MCs of Olive Channel's Tasty Road with Kim Min-jung. The same year, she joined tvN's variety show After the Play Ends and acted in the web drama Iron Lady.

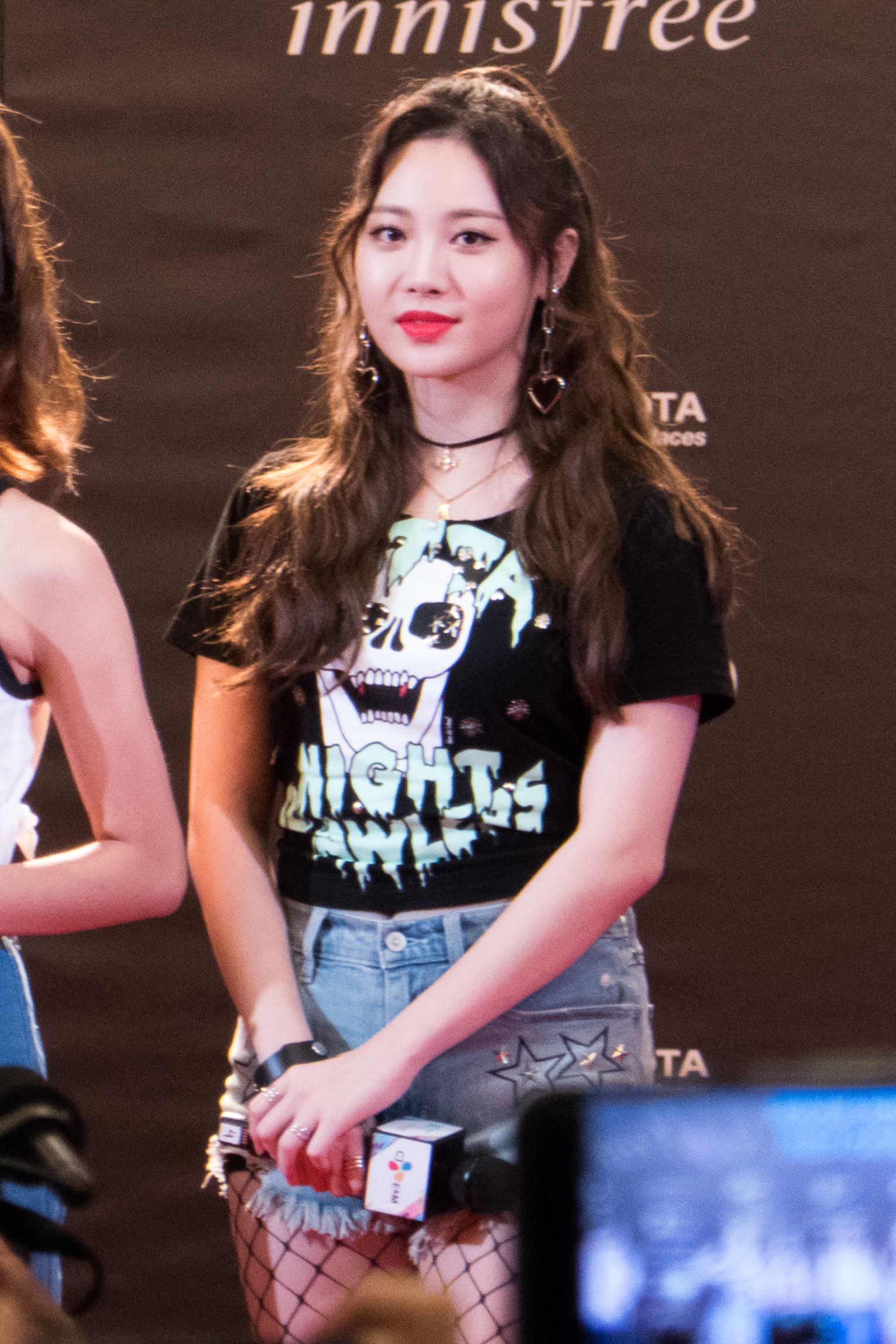
Yura at KCON LA in 2017

In 2017, Yura was cast as one of the new MCs of tvN's Life Bar with Kim Hee-chul, joining original MCs Shin Dong-yup and Kim Jun-hyun. She was also chosen as one of the MCs for KBS Drama's Beauty Bible 2017, alongside Han Hye-jin and Im Soo-hyang. The same year, she starred in JTBC's short drama Hip Hop Teacher.

On December 18, 2017, Yura starred in KBS' romance drama Radio Romance. On March 29, 2019, it was announced that Yura had signed a contract with Awesome ENT On December 7, 2021, Yura made her debut as the author of the poetry collection of Journeys in Different Seasons with Na Tae-joo. On February 8, 2022, Yura decided to extend her contract with Awesome Ent.

== Personal life ==
=== Lawsuit ===
On November 8, 2010, Yura's ex-management company Action Music Entertainment filed an injunction against Yura, stopping her from signing a second contract with Dream T Entertainment. In response, representatives of Dream T stated Action Music had violated contractual terms. The lawsuit was pursued when Action Music insisted that they had a video of Yura's unacceptable behavior. On January 20, 2011, the court ruled in Yura's favor.

== Discography ==
=== Singles ===
==== As featured artist ====
Title	Year	Album
"I'll Love You" (Jevice featuring Yura)	2012	Non-album single

== Filmography ==
=== Film ===
Year	Title	Role	Ref.
2023	Marrying the Mafia: Returns	Jang Jin-kyung	
2024	Hauch	Bae Kyung-hwa	

=== Television series ===
Year	Title	Role	Notes	Ref.
2011	I Trusted Him		Cameo	
2012	The Secret Angel	Yu-bin	Chinese drama	
2012	To the Beautiful You	Lee Eun-young		
2012	Family	Character in fanfic	Cameo (Episode 11)	
2013	Reckless Family 3	Park Yoo-ra		
2013	The Clinic for Married Couples: Love and War 2	Yoo-jung		
2014	Be Arrogant	Hong Ha-ra		
2018	Radio Romance	Jin Tae-ri		
2019	Psychopath Diary	Girl with a dog in park	Cameo (Episode 2)	
2020	Find Me in Your Memory	Go Yu-ra	Cameo (Episodes 2 & 4)	
2021–2022	Now, We Are Breaking Up	Hye-rin		
2022	Forecasting Love and Weather	Chae Yoo-jin		
2023	Destined With You	Yoon Na-yeon		
2025	Confidence Queen	Gas station worker	Special appearance	

=== Web series ===
Year	Title	Role	Ref.
2016	Iron Lady	Jenny	
2017	Hip Hop Teacher	Kim Yoo-bin	

=== Television shows ===
Year	Title	Role	Notes	Ref.
2014–2015	We Got Married	Cast member	with Hong Jong-hyun (Episodes 91–131)	
2015	K-pop Star 4	Host	with Jun Hyun-moo	
2015	Super Idol!	Host		
2016	Tasty Road	Host	with Kim Min-jung	
2016	5th Gaon Chart K-Pop Awards	Host	with Leeteuk	
2017	Living Together in Empty Room	Cast member	Episodes 4–8, 19–21	
2017	Life Bar	Host	Season 2	
2017	Beauty Bible 2017	Host	with Han Hye-jin and Im Soo-hyang	
2017	Battle Trip	Host	Episode 54–57	
2017–2019	Weekly China Now	Host		
2018	Sea Police	Cast member		
2018	2018 Miss Korea Pageant	Host	with Park Soo-hong	
2018	Idol Star Athletics Championships	Host	Chuseok Special (Bowling)	
2019	Star Crews on Board	Cast member		
2019	Idol Star Athletics Championships	Host	New Year Special (Bowling)	
2019	Seoul Mate	Cast member	Season 3	
2024	An Unusual History Meal	Cast member		
2024	Trend Shopper	Host	Season 2-3	

=== Web shows ===
Year	Title	Role	Notes	Ref.
2021–2025	Transit Love	Panelist	Season 1–4	

=== Radio shows ===
Year	Title	Role	Note	Ref.
2021	Young Street	Special DJ	June 7 – June 13	

=== Music video appearances ===
Year	Title	Artist	Ref.
2014	"Night & Day"	Wheesung	
2015	"On Rainy Days"	Kim Tae Bum (Party Street) feat Sojin	

== Publication ==
Year	Title	Author	Illustrator	Publisher	Ref.
2022	Travel in Different Seasons: Korean Poem of Na Tae-ju with Yura's Paintings	Na Tae-ju	Yura	Bookfolio	

== Awards and nominations ==
Name of the award ceremony, year presented, category, nominee of the award, and the result of the nomination
Award ceremony	Year	Category	Nominee / Work	Result	Ref.
Golden Cinematography Awards	2024	Best New Actress Award	Marrying the Mafia: Returns	Won	
Blue Dragon Series Awards	2022	Best Female Entertainer	Transit Love	Nominated	
Blue Dragon Series Awards	2023	Best Female Entertainer	Transit Love 2	Nominated	
Cable TV Broadcast Awards	2015	Popularity Award	Dodohara	Won	
MBC Entertainment Awards	2014	Rookie Female Award	We Got Married	Won	
MBC Entertainment Awards	2017	Female Excellence Award – Variety	Living Together in Empty Room	Nominated	
