= James Coviello =

American fashion designer

James Coviello is an American fashion designer. He had a longtime collaboration with Anna Sui and later launched his own namesake label.
