= Hong Jin-young =

South Korean trot singer and entertainer (born 1985)

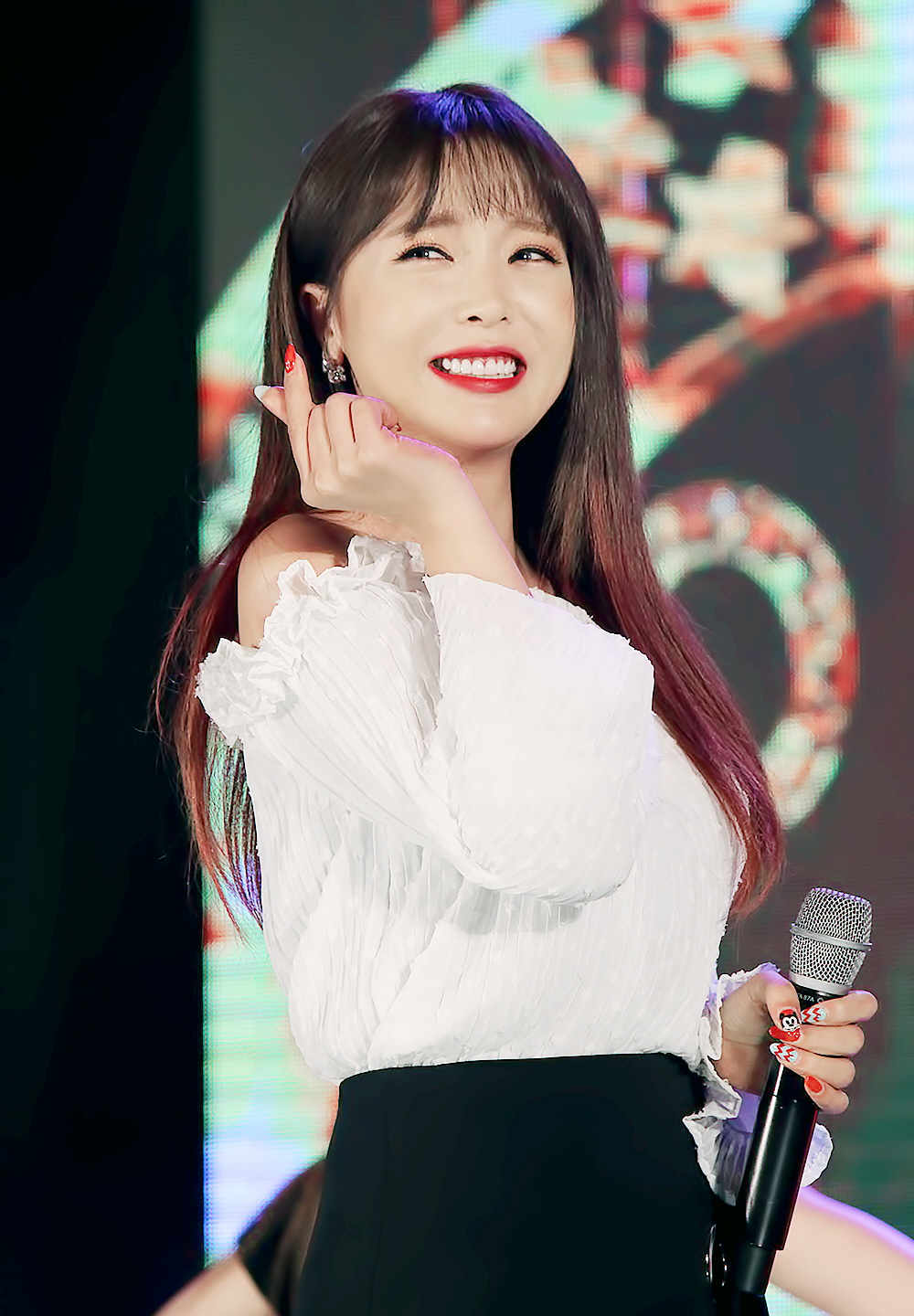
- Hong in 2017
- Born: August 9, 1985 (age 41); Gwangju, South Korea
- Education: Chosun University
- Occupations: Singer; actress; entertainer
- Musical career
- Genre: Trot
- Years active: 2006–present
- Labels: Mnet Media; Core Contents; Music K; IMH
- Formerly of: SWAN

Korean name
- Hangul: 홍진영
- RR: Hong Jinyeong
- MR: Hong Chinyŏng

Hong Jin-young (Korean: 홍진영; born August 9, 1985) is a South Korean trot singer, actress, and entertainer. She was a member of the short-lived South Korean girl group SWAN, which debuted in 2007. In 2009, she returned to the music scene, debuting as a trot singer. She is known for her vocal ability, signature aegyo, appearances on many variety programs, and prevalence at events throughout South Korea all year round.

== Career ==
=== 2006–2008: Career beginnings ===
Hong made her debut in small film and television roles. In 2006, she had a small part in the movie Who Slept With Her? (누가 그녀와 잤을까) and she also played a role in Yeon Gaesomun, a historical Korean drama that takes place in the seventh century.

Hong began her music career in 2007, with SWAN (스완), a Korean girl group consisting of members, Han Ji-na, Hong Jin-young, Heo Yoon-mi, and Kim Yeon-ji, with their debut song "Call Me When You Hear This Song" (이 노래 들으면 전화해), featuring Coolapika.

=== 2009–present: Solo career ===
In 2009, her agency (CCM) CEO suggested her to switch to become a solo trot singer, a suggestion she initially resisted given her young age, as trot is regarded as an "older" genre of music in Korea. Nonetheless, she released her first digital single, "Love Battery" (사랑의 배터리). On August 6, 2010, she returned with a new digital single entitled, "My Love". On June 30, 2011, Hong along with many of South Korea's rising stars sang at the Changwon Sports Complex in a concert called "Changwon's First Anniversary Hope Concert, We Are". On March 22, 2013, she returned with the release of the digital single, "Boogie Man" (부기맨). During the year 2014, she had parted ways from Core Contents Media alongside Davichi.

Hong is well known for her multiple appearances on popular music variety shows like Immortal Songs 2 and King of Mask Singer. In 2014, she was a panelist and also in a virtual marriage with Namkoong Min on a popular variety show, We Got Married. In November of that year, Hong released her first EP, Life Note (인생노트) with the title song “Cheer Up” (산다는 건). Her virtual husband, Namkoong Min, appeared as her love interest in the music video in a cameo role.

In 2016, she released her second EP, The Most Beautiful Moment in Life (화양연화), with the title song “Thumb Up” (엄지 척) and “Love Wifi” (사랑의 와이파이). She also released a cover of a well-known Chinese song called “The Moon Represents My Heart” (月亮代表我的心/월량대표아적심). For the Korean remake, Hong wrote the lyrics herself.

In February 2017, Hong released a digital single called “Loves Me, Loves Me Not” (사랑한다 안한다) from “A Fabricated City” (조작된 도시) OST.

In 2017, Hong was cast as a regular member of Sister's Slam Dunk. She was assigned as a rapper by the producers as it has been Hong's dream to become a rapper for a group, and she received direction from group leader Minzy and Jeon So-mi wrote the rap lyrics for their single, "Right?" (맞지?).

Hong collaborated with comedian Kim Young-chul to release the electrot (EDM and trot) single "Ring Ring" (따르릉) on April 20, 2017, for which they won Best Trot at the 2017 MelOn Music Awards.

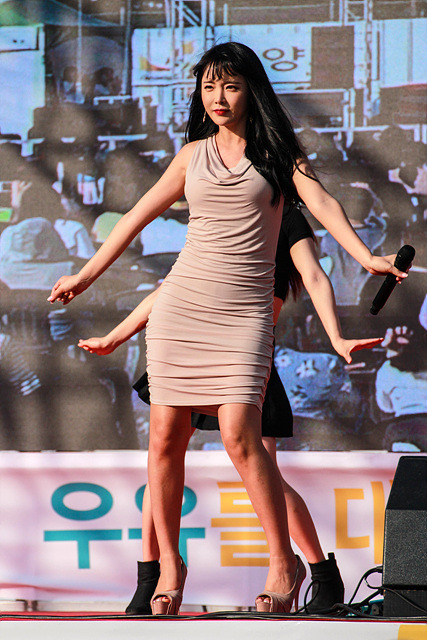
Hong performing on May 26, 2018

In 2018, Hong released a retro trot style digital single, "Good Bye" (잘가라), composed by her long-time collaborator Jo Young-soo (who also composed “Love Battery” and “Cheer Up”) and well-known K-pop lyricist Kim Eana. She wrote and composed a second electrot single "I Kicked My Luck Off" (복을 발로 차버렸어) for Kang Ho-dong, which was released through SM Station. In December 2018, Hong released a trot single about people and experiences in Seoul, entitled "Seoul" (서울사람), a collaboration with rapper Bray (브레이) which she produced with Park Keun-tae (박근태).

In January 2019, Hong released a digital single, a ballad titled "Love Is…" (사랑은 다 이러니). On 12 January 2019, Hong made her U.S. concert debut at the Pechanga Resort & Casino in California, to an audience of over 3,000. In March 2019, Hong finally released her first studio album, titled Lots of Love (랏츠 오브 러브). She often appears on the KBS 1TV Golden Oldies (Korean: 가요무대).

On March 21, 2022, Hong's agency announced that has finished recording a new song and filmed a music video as well. After the announcement, on April 6, 2022, the single "Viva La Vida" was released with both Korean and English versions of the song and video.

On November 1, 2022, Hong's agency announced that the release of "You are there" has been postponed from November 3 to November 11 due to the Seoul Halloween crowd crush.

On February 25, 2024, Hong released a ballad digital single and Music Video, titled "Spring", in her first collaboration with Jo Young-soo in 10 years since her song "Cheer up".

== Education ==
Hong holds a Bachelor of Commerce from Chosun University. She also received a master's degree in Trade in 2009 and a PhD degree in Business Administration in 2012 from the same university, which were both revoked in 2020 due to plagiarism.

=== Plagiarism ===
On November 5, 2020, Hong was accused of plagiarizing her Master of Trade's thesis after scoring 74 percent on the plagiarism review site "Copy Killer". On the same day, her agency released a statement denying all accusations, stating her thesis was "under review in 2009" and that "Copy Killer is a system that began obligatory use in universities beginning 2015 and is meant to filter out submissions with more than 50 percent plagiarized content. It is inevitable that a thesis that was reviewed in 2009 when the system did not exist would come out with a high score."

On November 6, 2020, Hong released another statement after the accusation continued to spread. In her statement released through her personal Instagram, she stated that "I've decided to give up my master's and doctoral degrees. I think that is the best thing that I can do at this moment."

On December 15, 2020, the Research Integrity Committee under the Chosun University Ethics Committee made the tentative judgement of plagiarism regarding Hong's master's thesis and come to a conclusion that the thesis may be plagiarized. The committee later referred the case to the Graduate School Committee, which had given Hong until 5 PM KST on December 18 to submit a written explanation, before making a final decision to determine if the plagiarism took place through a meeting which will be held on December 23. If the meeting determines that she plagiarized, then both her master's and doctoral degrees will be cancelled automatically.

On December 18, 2020, Hong released another statement through her personal Instagram, stating that she will accept Chosun University's tentative conclusion of plagiarism and she admitted to plagiarizing her thesis.

On December 23, 2020, Chosun University Graduate School Committee confirmed that Hong masters thesis was plagiarized and accordingly all her postgraduate degrees obtained from the university would be revoked.

== Discography ==
=== Studio albums ===
Title	Details	Track listing	Peak chart positions	Sales
Title	Details	Track listing	KOR	Sales
Lots of Love	Released: March 8, 2019; Labels: Music K Entertainment, LOEN Entertainment; Language: Korean	Track listing: 1. Love Tonight; 2. Coming Spring; 3. Rain of Tears; 4. Love is...; 5. Thumb Up; 6. Seoul (ft. Bray); 7. Good Bye; 8. Boogie Man; 9. Ring Ring (Composer Version); 10. Love Battery; 11. Cheer Up; 12. I Like Love; 13. Love Tonight (Instrumental)	17	KOR: 4,083

=== Extended plays ===
Title	Album details	Peak chart positions	Sales
Title	Album details	KOR	Sales
Life Note	Released: November 6, 2014; Labels: Music K Entertainment, LOEN Entertainment; Formats: CD, digital download; Track listing: 1. Cheer Up (산다는 건); 2. Love Battery (사랑의 배터리) (2014 Ver.); 3. My Love (내 사랑 줄까 말까) (2014 Ver.); 4. Boogie Man (부기맨); 5. What's Wrong With My Age? (내 나이가 어때서); 6. Cheer Up (Inst.)	18	KOR: 1,691
花樣年華: The Most Beautiful Moment in Life	Released: March 24, 2016; Labels: Music K Entertainment, LOEN Entertainment; Formats: CD, digital download; Track listing: 1. Thumb Up (엄지 척); 2. Love Battery (사랑의 배터리) (2014 Ver.); 3. Like Love (사랑이 좋아); 4. Love Wifi (사랑의 와이파이); 5. Cheer Up (산다는 건); 6. Thumb Up (Inst.)	27	KOR: 965
Color Mood	Released: December 2, 2022; Labels: IMH Entertainment; Formats: digital download; Track listing: 1. Girl In The Mirror (feat Frawley); 2. Stay; 3. My Consolation; 4. When White Snow Falls; 5. Good Bye My Love; 6. Girl In The Mirror (Inst)	—	
"—" denotes a recording that did not chart or was not released in that territory

=== Singles ===
Title	Year	Peak chart positions	Sales (DL)	Album
Title	Year	KOR	Sales (DL)	Album
"Love Battery" (사랑의 배터리)	2009	—	—N/a	Non album-singles
"My Love" (내 사랑)	2010	48	—N/a	Non album-singles
"Boogie Man" (부기맨)	2013	88	KOR: 37,591	Life Note
"Cheer Up" (산다는 건)	2014	19	KOR: 704,849	Life Note
"Love Wifi" (사랑의 와이파이)	2015	39	KOR: 66,129	The Most Beautiful Moment in Life
"Thumb Up" (엄지 척)	2016	131	KOR: 23,247	The Most Beautiful Moment in Life
"The Moon Represents My Heart" (기다리는 마음)	2016	94	KOR: 18,473	Non album-singles
"Loves Me, Loves Me Not" (사랑한다 안한다)	2017	86	KOR: 18,114	Non album-singles
"Good Bye" (잘가라)	2018	94	—N/a	Lots of Love
"Seoul" (서울사람) (feat. Bray)	2018	—	—N/a	Lots of Love
"Love is..." (사랑은 다 이러니)	2019	57	—N/a	Lots of Love
"Love Tonight" (오늘 밤에)	2019	39	—N/a	Lots of Love
"Love Is Like a Petal" (사랑은 꽃잎처럼)	2020	151	—N/a	Birth Flower
"Comfort Me" (위로해 주세요)	2020	—	—N/a	Non album-singles
"Never Ever" (안돼요)	2020	— (Note: "Never Ever" did not enter Gaon Digital Chart, but peaked at position 36 on the component Download Chart.)	—N/a	Non album-singles
"Viva La Vida" (비바 라 비다)	2022	— (Note: "Viva La Vida" did not enter the Gaon Digital Chart, but peaked at number 24 on the component Download Chart, and number seven on the component BGM Chart.)	—N/a	Non album-singles
"Destiny" (그대 얼굴)	2022	— (Note: "Destiny" did not enter the Circle Digital Chart, but peaked at number 51 on the component Download Chart)	—N/a	Non album-singles
"Stay" (니가 있었다)	2022	— (Note: "Stay" did not enter the Circle Digital Chart, but peaked at number 99 on the component Download Chart)	—N/a	Color Mood
"Girl In The Mirror" (feat. Frawley)	2022	— (Note: "Girl In The Mirror" did not enter the Circle Digital Chart, but peaked at number 86 on the component Download Chart)	—N/a	Color Mood
"—" denotes releases that did not chart or were not released in that region.

=== Collaborations ===
Title	Year	Peak chart positions	Sales (DL)	Album
Title	Year	KOR	Sales (DL)	Album
"Photo of Mom and Dad's Christmas (MBC bouquet.)" (사진 속 엄마 아빠의 크리스마스 (MBC 꽃다발)) (with Chae Yeon, An Jin Kyoung, Kwak Hyun-hwa)	2010	—	—N/a	Non-album single
"Itaewon Battery" (이태원 배터리) (with Yoo Se-yoon)	2014	81	KOR: 19,339	Trot X-TD Collabo
"You Are My Flower" (꽃, 달, 술) (with DIA and Kim Yeon-ja)	2017	—	—N/a	YOLO
"Ring Ring" (따르릉) (with Kim Young-chul)	2017	—	—N/a	non-album singles
"Sangnoksu 2020" (상록수 2020) (with various artists)	2020	—	—N/a	non-album singles
"—" denotes releases that did not chart or were not released in that region.

=== Soundtrack appearances ===
Title	Year	Album
"What's Wrong With My Age" (내 나이가 어때서)	2014	Glorious Day OST
"Give Me Back My Youth" (청춘을 돌려다오) (featuring Outsider)	2014	Mr. Back OST
"I Like Love" (사랑이 좋아)	2015	All About My Mom OST
"Shadow of the moon" (달의 그림자)	2017	Clans: Shadow of the Moon OST
"Love is Coming" (그대 오는 날)	2020	Beautiful Love, Wonderful Life OST
"Confidently" (당당하게)	2022	Gold Mask OST

=== Compilation appearances ===
Title	Year	Album
"A Woman Dancing Samba" (쌈바의 여인) (with Joosuc)	2013	Immortal Songs: Singing the Legend (Seol Woon-do Part 1)
"Hello" (안녕하세요) (with Outsider)	2013	Immortal Songs: Singing the Legend (Jang Mi-hwa & Im Hee-sok)
"The Street of the City" (도시의 거리)	2013	Immortal Songs: Singing the Legend (Yoo Yeol & Jung Sura Part 2)
"The girl and the street light (original song singer Jin Mi-ryeong)" (소녀와 가로등 (원곡가수 진미령))	2014	Travel Yesterday Episode 3
"Star" (별) (with Seunghee of Oh My Girl)	2015	King of Mask Singer Episode 31
"Legends of the Fall" (가을의 전설)	2015	King of Mask Singer Episode 32
"Be Happy" (with Seol Woon-do)	2017	Fantastic Duo 2 Part.7
"Love Battery" (사랑의 배터리) (with Heo Won Nyeong, Shin Ji-won & Jeon Tae-sung)	2017	Fantastic Duo 2 Part.7
"Cheer Up" (산다는 건) (with Heo Won-nyung)	2017	Fantastic Duo 2 Part.7
"Dance with DOC" (DOC와 춤을)	2017	Immortal Songs: Singing the Legend (DJ DOC)
"Sexy Man" (섹시한 남자)	2018	Immortal Songs: Singing the Legend (2018 Lunar New Year Special)
"Change"	2018	Immortal Songs: Singing the Legend (Our Youth and Love Story, Lyricist Park Joo-yeon Part 2)
"Love Battery (Live)" (사랑의 배터리 (Live)) (with malguem)	2019	2019 KSMF LIVE
"Bruise" (멍)	2019	Immortal Songs: Singing the Legend (Singing the Great Challenge of Stars in Episode 401)
"Blue in You" (그대안의 블루) (with Lim Young-woong)	2020	Romantic Call Centre Part 5
"Tonight" (오늘밤에) (with Young Tak)	2020	Romantic Call Centre Part 5
"24 Hours" (사랑은 24시간)	2021	Battle of the Century AI vs Human
"Telepathy" (텔레파시)	2021	Battle of the Century AI vs Human

=== Writer and composer ===
- "Ring Ring" (따르릉) sung by Kim Young-chul (2017)
- "I Kicked My Luck Off" (복을 발로 차버렸어) sung by Kang Ho-dong (2018)

== Filmography ==
=== Film ===
Year	Title	Role	Note
2006	Who Slept with Her?	Baek Yang (General Affairs Division)	

=== Television series ===
Year	Title	Role	Ref.
2006	Yeon Gaesomun	Cameo	
2011	Lights and Shadows	Yoon Ji-hye	
2014	My Secret Hotel	Cameo (Episode 7–8)	
2015	Sweet, Savage Family	Cameo	

=== Television show ===
Year	Title	Notes	Ref.
2008	Cider	Starred as Anna in segment, "Anna's Mistake"	
2010	Flowers	Recurring panelist	
2011	Ranking Women	Recurring panelist	
2013–2014	World Changing Quiz Show	Recurring panelist	
2014	Kim Jiyeon's Sweet 19	Cast member (Episodes 10–16)	
2014	Trot X	Troducer / Trot Producer (March 21, 2014 – June 6, 2014)	
2014	We Got Married Season 4	Regular host; Cast member with Namkoong Min (Episodes 214–262)	
2015–2016	Rumor Has It	Host (October 19, 2015 – July 4, 2016)	
2015–2016	Find! Delicious TV	Host (October 31, 2015 – April 2, 2016)	
2017	Living Together in Empty Room	Cast member (pilot, episodes 1–4, 12–15)	
2017	Sister's Slam Dunk Season 2	Cast member	
2018	Shoot Out Mart War	Cast member	
2018	Law of the Jungle in Patagonia	Cast member	
2018–2020	My Little Old Boy	Cast member (episode 118–217)	
2022	Burning Trotman	Judge	

== Accolades ==
=== Awards and nominations ===
Name of the award ceremony, year presented, category, nominee of the award, and the result of the nomination
Award ceremony	Year	Category	Nominee / work	Result	Ref.
Asia Artist Awards	2021	Female Solo Singer Popularity Award – Trot	Hong Jin-young	Nominated	
Golden Disc Awards	2015	Best Trot	"Cheer Up"	Won	
MBC Entertainment Awards	2014	Excellence Award	Hong Jin-young; We Got Married	Won	
Melon Music Awards	2015	Best Trot	"Love Wifi"	Won	
Melon Music Awards	2016	Best Trot	"Thumb Up"	Won	
Melon Music Awards	2017	Best Trot	"Ring Ring (Composer Version)" (with Kim Young-chul)	Won	
Melon Music Awards	2018	Best Trot Award	"Good Bye"	Won	
Melon Music Awards	2019	Best Trot	"Love Tonight"	Won	
Mnet Asian Music Awards	2009	Best Trot	"Love Battery"	Won	
SBS Entertainment Awards	2018	Best Couple Award	Hong Jin-young (with Kim Jong-kook); Running Man and My Little Old Boy	Won	
SBS Entertainment Awards	2019	Top Excellence Award in Reality Category	Hong Jin-young; My Little Old Boy	Won	
Seoul Music Awards	2015	Best Trot	Hong Jin-Young	Won	
Seoul Music Awards	2016	Best Trot	Hong Jin-Young	Nominated	
Soribada Best K-Music Awards	2017	Korean Wave Trot Award	Hong Jin-Young	Won	
Soribada Best K-Music Awards	2018	New Hallyu Trot Award	Hong Jin-Young	Won	
Soribada Best K-Music Awards	2019	Trot Grand Award	Hong Jin-Young	Won	

=== Listicles ===
Name of publisher, year listed, name of listicle, and placement
Publisher	Year	Listicle	Placement	Ref.
Forbes	2018	Korea Power Celebrity	40th	
Forbes	2019	Korea Power Celebrity	7th	
Forbes	2020	Korea Power Celebrity	25th	
