= Choi Min-yong =

South Korean actor

- Born: June 6, 1977 (age 48) (Note: Choi's Lunar birthday is April 20, 1977. This is equivalent to June 6, 1977, in the Georgian calendar.); Seoul, South Korea
- Occupation: Actor
- Years active: 1996–present

Korean name
- Hangul: 최민용
- Hanja: 崔民勇
- RR: Choe Minyong
- MR: Ch'oe Minyong

Choi Min-yong (born June 6, 1977) is a South Korean actor. He is best known for his role in the hit sitcom High Kick!. He was a cast member in the MBC's variety show We Got Married with comedian Jang Do-yeon.

== Filmography ==
=== Television series ===
Year	Title	Role
1996	New Generation Report: Adults Don't Know	
2001	Stock Flower	Kang Woo-hyuk
2001	MBC Best Theater: I Can't See Your Love	Lee Dong-min
2001	Open Drama Man and Woman: Do We Have The Same Dream?	Kim Joon-hyuk
2002	Nonstop 3	Choi Min-yong
2004	Not Alone	Choi Min-yong
2004	MBC Best Theater: Goodbye for a Moment	Lee Woo-seok
2006	High Kick!	Lee Min-yong
2007	Finding Love	Lee Kang-hyuk

=== Film ===
Year	Title	Role
2011	Life Is Peachy	Detective Min-yong
2023	Dream Palace	

=== Variety show ===
Year	Title	Notes
2016	King of Mask Singer	Contestant (Bae Cheol-soo's Mask Camp) (Episode 87)
2017	King of Mask Singer	Panelist (Episodes 93–94, 97–98)
2017	We Got Married season 4	Cast member with Jang Do-yeon (Episodes 364–372)
2017	Men Who Leapt Through Time	Cast member
2017	Rural Police (Season 1)	Cast member
2017–2018	Wizard of Nowhere	Cast member

== Awards and nominations ==
Year	Award	Category	Nominated work	Result
2002	2nd MBC Entertainment Awards	Excellence Award, Actor in a Comedy/Sitcom	Nonstop 3	Won
2007	1st Mnet 20's Choice Awards	Best Kiss (with Seo Min-jung)	High Kick!	Won
2007	7th MBC Entertainment Awards	Popularity Award, Actor in a Comedy/Sitcom	High Kick!	Won
