= Yoon Jung-soo =

South Korean comedian

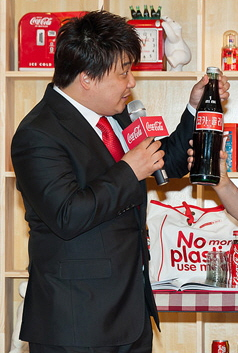
- Yoon at a Coca-Cola event in 2011
- Born: 8 February 1972 (age 54)
- Spouse: Won Ja-hyun (m. 2025)

Korean name
- Hangul: 윤정수
- RR: Yun Jeongsu
- MR: Yun Chŏngsu

Comedy career
- Years active: 1993–present
- Medium: Stand-up, television
- Genres: Observational, Sketch, Wit, Parody, Slapstick, Dramatic, Sitcom

Yoon Jung-soo (Korean: 윤정수; born February 8, 1972) is a South Korean comedian.

== Personal life ==
On September 2, 2025, it was reported that Yoon had registered his marriage with former MBC sports reporter Won Ja-hyun and that they would hold a ceremony in November.

== Variety show ==
Year	Title	Network	Note	Ref.
2020	King of Mask Singer	MBC	Contestant as "Poodle" (episode 245)	
2021	A Leader's Day	Channel IHQ	Cast Member	

== Awards and nominations ==
Year	Award	Category	Nominated work	Result	Ref.
2003	MBC Entertainment Awards	Star in Show Variety		Won	
2004	MBC Entertainment Awards	Excellence Award in Show Variety		Won	
2017	MBC Entertainment Awards	Special Award in Variety	Wizard of Nowhere	Won	
2017	SBS Entertainment Awards	Scene Stealer Award	My Little Old Boy	Won	
2021	KBS Entertainment Awards	New Radio DJ of the Year (with Nam Chang-hee)	Mr.Radio	Won	
