= We Got Married season 4 =

Season of a South Korean television series

We Got Married (Korean: 우리 결혼했어요) is a South Korean reality variety show and was a segment of the Sunday Sunday Night program. First broadcast in 2008, the show pairs up Korean celebrities to show what life would be like if they were married. Each week, couples are assigned missions to complete, while interviews with the participants reveal their thoughts and feelings.

== Couples ==
Original couples

- Leeteuk & Kang So-ra (Ep 133-134): Idol and actress
- Julien Kang & Yoon Se-ah (Ep 133-159): Actor/model and actress
- ZE:A's Hwang Kwang-hee & Secret's Han Sun-hwa (Ep 133-166): Two young idols who were friends before being paired together
- MBLAQ's Lee Joon & Oh Yeon-seo (Ep 135-155): Young idol/aspiring actor and actress

Additional couples

- 2AM's Jinwoon & Go Joon-hee (Ep 156-186): Idol and actress
- Jo Jung-chi & Choi Jung-in (Ep 160-186): Real-life couple (now married), both musicians/singers
- Shinee's Taemin & Apink's Son Na-eun (Ep 167-203): Idol and idol
- Yoonhan & Lee So-yeon (Ep 187-213): Pianist and actress
- Jung Joon-young & Jung Yu-mi (Ep 187-222): Rocker and actress
- 2PM's Wooyoung & Park Se-young (Ep 204-237): Idol and actress
- Namkoong Min & Hong Jin-young (Ep 214-262): Actor and singer
- Hong Jong-hyun & Girl's Day's Yura (Ep 223-262): Actor and idol
- Song Jae-rim & Kim So-eun (Ep 238-275): Actor and actress
- Henry Lau & Kim Ye-won (Ep 263-264, 266-275): Idol/actor and actress
- CNBLUE's Lee Jong-hyun & Gong Seung-yeon (Ep 263-286): Idol/actor and actress
- Oh Min-suk & Kang Ye-won (Ep 276-310): Actor and actress
- BTOB's Yook Sung-jae & Red Velvet's Joy (Ep 276-320): Idol and idol
- Kwak Si-yang & Kim So-yeon (Ep 287-316): Actor and actress
- Jo Se-ho & Fiestar's Cao Lu (Ep 311-314, 316-340): Comedian and idol
- Eric Nam & Mamamoo's Solar (Ep 316-348): Singer/MC and idol
- MADTOWN's Jota & Kim Jin-kyung (Ep 321-350): Idol and model
- Choi Tae-joon & Apink's Yoon Bo-mi (Ep 341-363): Actor and idol
- Untouchable's Sleepy & Lee Guk-joo (Ep 349-372): Singer and comedian
- Gong Myung & Jung Hye-sung (Ep 351-372): Actor/idol and actress
- Choi Min-yong & Jang Do-yeon (Ep 364-373): Actor and comedian

== Episode summaries ==
Ep	Date aired	Notes
133	1 September 2012	Leeteuk and Kang So-ra go camping. Julien Kang and Yoon Se-ah move into the We Got Married (WGM) village. Hwang Kwang-hee and Han Sun-hwa meet for the first time.
134	8 September 2012	Leeteuk and Kang So-ra's virtual marriage concludes. Julien Kang and Yoon Se-ah start their married life officially. Hwang Kwang-hee and Han Sun-hwa go out for the first time.
135	15 September 2012	Julien Kang and Yoon Se-ah have a cooking battle. Hwang Kwang-hee and Han Sun-hwa move into WGM village. Lee Joon and Oh Yeon-seo meet for the first time.
136	22 September 2012	Julien Kang and Yoon Se-ah wash their car and do the Gangnam Style dance. Hwang Kwang-hee and Han Sun-hwa prepare a birthday feast. Oh Yeon-seo visits MBLAQ Lee Joon's dorm.
137	29 September 2012	Julien Kang and Yoon Se-ah have English lessons. Hwang Kwang-hee and Han Sun-hwa celebrate Kwanghee's birthday. Lee Joon and Oh Yeon-seo move in.
138	6 October 2012	WGM village meeting
139	13 October 2012	WGM village meeting
140	20 October 2012	Julien Kang and Yoon Se-ah have a Thanksgiving party. Han Sun-hwa's birthday. Lee Joon and Oh Yeon-seo plant vegetables and establish ground rules.
141	27 October 2012	Julien Kang and Yoon Se-ah harvest chestnuts. Han Sun-hwa's birthday. Lee Joon and Oh Yeon-seo go to the beach.
142	3 November 2012	Julien Kang and Yoon Se-ah go to the hospital. Hwang Kwang-hee and Han Sun-hwa do skincare together. Lee Joon and Oh Yeon-seo spend time at the beach.
143	10 November 2012	WGM village kimchi-making event. Hwang Kwang-hee and Han Sun-hwa go shopping. Lee Joon and Oh Yeon-seo go to the market together.
144	17 November 2012	WGM village kimchi-making event. Halloween amusement park party.
145	24 November 2012	Julien Kang and Yoon Se-ah have Korean lessons. Hwang Kwang-hee and Han Sun-hwa visit murals. Lee Joon and Oh Yeon-seo tour Han river at night.
146	1 December 2012	Julien Kang and Yoon Se-ah go camping. Hwang Kwang-hee and Han Sun-hwa take care of chickens. Lee Joon and Oh Yeon-seo clean rooms.
147	8 December 2012	Julien Kang and Yoon Se-ah go camping. Hwang Kwang-hee and Han Sun-hwa's feast preparations. Lee Joon's mother visits, and teaches aegyo.
148	15 December 2012	Julien Kang and Yoon Se-ah go camping. Hwang Kwang-hee and Han Sun-hwa welcomes feast guests. Lee Joon's mother's visit continues.
149	22 December 2012	Hawaii vacation of three couples.
150	29 December 2012	Hawaii vacation of three couples.
151	5 January 2013	First night of honeymoon.
152	12 January 2013	The three couples learn dancing.
153	19 January 2013	Julien Kang and Yoon Se-ah's birthday preparations. Hwang Kwang-hee and Han Sun-hwa 's new years wishing bell. Lee Joon and Oh Yeon-seo learn cooking.
154	26 January 2013	Julien Kang and Yoon Se-ah's birthday preparations. Hwang Kwang-hee and Han Sun-hwa play with tarot cards and make fish soup. Lee Joon and Oh Yeon-seo meet with MBLAQ.
155	2 February 2013	Julien Kang and Yoon Se-ah go to a club. Hwang Kwang-hee and Han Sun-hwa do hair and makeup together. Lee Joon and Oh Yeon-seo's virtual marriage concludes.
156	9 February 2013	Julien Kang and Yoon Se-ah's traditional wedding. Hwang Kwang-hee's parents come visit. Jinwoon and Go Joon-hee meet for the first time.
157	16 February 2013	Hwang Kwang-hee's parents come visit. Jinwoon and Go Joon-hee meet for the first time.
158	23 February 2013	Hwang Kwang-hee and Han Sun-hwa work out together. Jinwoon and Go Joon-hee cook together.
159	2 March 2013	Julien Kang and Yoon Se-ah's virtual marriage concludes. Hwang Kwang-hee and Han Sun-hwa make perfume together. Jinwoon and Go Joon-hee participate in cooking and driving.
160	9 March 2013	Hwang Kwang-hee and Han Sun-hwa babysit. The real-life couple of 11 years, Jung-in and Jo Jung-chi, start their virtual marriage. Jinwoon and Go Joon-hee go fencing.
161	16 March 2013	Hwang Kwang-hee and Han Sun-hwa babysit. Jinwoon and Go Joon-hee perform at a show together. Jung-in and Jung-chi must find each other using the memories of their relationship.
162	23 March 2013	Jung-in and Jung-chi visit an amusement park for the very first time. Hwang Kwang-hee and Han Sun-hwa babysit. Go Joon-hee visits Jinwoon's job.
163	30 March 2013	Kwanghee, Sunhwa, Jinwoon and Joon-hee go on a camping double date. Jung-chi and Jung-in receive a mission to move into the We Got Married village.
164	6 April 2013	All three couples go on an outing together and compete to see which couple gets to move into the house with a pool.
165	13 April 2013	Jung-in and Jung-chi start setting up their new home. Kwanghee and Sunhwa reflect on their virtual marriage. Joon-hee visits Jinwoon's family.
166	20 April 2013	Jung-chi and Jung-in host a housewarming party. Kwanghee and Sunhwa's virtual marriage concludes. Jinwoon and Joon-hee start gardening.
167	27 April 2013	Jung-in and Jung-chi's housewarming party continues. Jinwoon surprises Joon-hee at the airport. Lee Tae-min and Son Na-eun meet for the first time.
168	4 May 2013	Jung-chi and Jung-in get medical examinations. Jinwoon and Joon-hee try out sky yoga together. Lee Tae-min and Na-eun's first meeting continues as they spend time together on a boat out in the ocean.
169	11 May 2013	Jung-chi tries to cheer up Jung-in after they receive her medical examination results. Lee Tae-min and Na-eun visit their high school. Joon-hee prepares a surprise birthday party for Jinwoon.
170	18 May 2013	Jung-in and Jung-chi prepare for a commercial shoot. Jinwoon has his surprise birthday party. Lee Tae-min and Na-eun go on a date in Myeong-dong.
171	25 May 2013	Jung-in's mother visits Jung-in and Jung-chi. Lee Tae-min and Na-eun move into their home. Jinwoon and Joon-hee celebrate their 100th day together with a honeymoon in Japan.
172	1 June 2013	Jung-chi, Jung-in and their friends visit a temple in the mountains. Lee Tae-min and Na-eun celebrate his Coming of Age Day. Jinwoon and Joon-hee spend their first night together.
173	8 June 2013	Jung-in and Jung-chi's temple visit continues. Lee Tae-min and Na-eun continue to celebrate his Coming of Age Day. Jinwoon and Joon-hee continue their honeymoon in Japan.
174	15 June 2013	Jung-in and Jung-chi's temple visit continues. Lee Tae-min and Na-eun host a housewarming party. Jinwoon and Joon-hee have a wedding in Japan.
175	22 June 2013	Jung-in and Jung-chi make couple rings. Lee Tae-min's Coming of Age Day party continues. He and Na-eun are later given a mission to meet the other couples.
176	29 June 2013	The three couples meet together, initiating a couples photoshoot competition.
177	6 July 2013	The couples prepare for their photoshoots.
178	13 July 2013	The couples have their own photoshoots, then finish by joining together.
179	20 July 2013	The results of the photoshoot competition are revealed.
180	27 July 2013	Jung-chi and Jung-in take a trip to Ulleungdo. Lee Tae-min will be leaving for Japan for a month so he and Na-eun spend time together. Jinwoon and Joon-hee work on a song together.
181	3 August 2013	Jung-chi and Jung-in's Ulleungdo trip continues. Jinwoon and Joon-hee work on the lyrics of their song. Lee Tae-min looks for a gift and prepares a surprise for Na-eun during their time apart.
182	10 August 2013	Jung-chi and Jung-in visit a water park for the first time. Jinwoon and Joon-hee go on a fashion date. Lee Tae-min's surprise for Na-eun and Apink is revealed.
183	17 August 2013	Jung-chi and Jung-in are given a mission to clean up their home. They then have a shaved ice competition. Jinwoon and Joon-hee go horseback riding. Lee Tae-min's surprise for Na-eun and Apink continues.
184	24 August 2013	Jinwoon and Joon-hee search for clams and play around in the mudflats. Na-eun gives Lee Tae-min a birthday surprise. Jung-chi gets a hair makeover. Key and Eunji have a blind date.
185	31 August 2013	Jinwoon gives Joon-hee a surprise birthday party. Lee Tae-min, Na-eun, Key and Eunji have a double date at an amusement park. Jung-chi and Jung-in reflect on their time together and work on a time capsule for their memories.
186	7 September 2013	Jung-chi and Jung-in continue reflecting on their memories as their virtual marriage concludes. Lee Tae-min, Na-eun, Key and Eunji's double date continues. Jinwoon and Joon-hee's virtual marriage concludes.
187	14 September 2013	Jung Joon-young and Jung Yu-mi meet for the first time. Lee Tae-min and Na-eun play in the water then have a sincere chat over a couple of drinks. Yoonhan and Lee So-yeon have their first meeting.
188	21 September 2013	Yu-mi pays a visit to Joon-young's house. Lee Tae-min and Na-eun are visited by most of the SHINee members along with Eunji for Chuseok. Yoonhan and So-yeon have a romantic meal that he prepared.
189	28 September 2013	Lee Tae-min and Na-eun's Chuseok celebration with their members continues. Joon-young and Yu-mi move into their new home. Yoonhan and So-yeon go on a romantic picnic date.
190	5 October 2013	Lee Tae-min and Na-eun go on a camping trip where they harvest grapes for wine. Joon-young and Yu-mi continue settling into their new home. Yoonhan meets So-yeon's sister.
191	12 October 2013	Yoonhan and So-yeon move into their new home. Joon-young and Yu-mi write their couple rules. Lee Tae-min and Na-eun's camping trip continues.
192	19 October 2013	Lee Tae-min and Na-eun have a date at Heyri Art Village. Joon-young teaches Yu-mi how to ride a skateboard. Yoonhan and So-yeon clean their house then eat a meal prepared by So-yeon.
193	26 October 2013	Lee Tae-min and Na-eun continue their date in Heyri Art Village. Yu-mi joins Joon-young at the filming of his music video. Yoonhan and So-yeon walk on the red carpet of the '18th Busan International Film Festival' together.
194	2 November 2013	Na-eun prepares a surprise for Lee Tae-min in honor of SHINee's comeback. Joon-young performs at a road-side concert with the support of Yu-mi. So-yeon and Yoonhan go for couple counseling. After giving Yoonhan a birthday surprise, they have a bridal shower with So-yeon's friends.
195	9 November 2013	Lee Tae-min and Na-eun visit a recording studio after SHINee's comeback. Joon-young and Yu-mi practice for a marathon. So-yeon's bridal shower with her friends continues. Yoonhan and So-yeon also try making pottery.
196	16 November 2013	Lee Tae-min and Na-eun enjoy a date on the beach in Jeju Island. Joon-young and Yu-mi continue practicing for the marathon then spend time together at home. Yoonhan and So-yeon have their wedding photoshoot.
197	23 November 2013	Lee Tae-min and Na-eun return to the first place they met on Jeju Island to celebrate their 200th day together. Joon-young and Yu-mi go on a trip to Japan. Yoonhan and So-yeon's wedding photoshoot continues.
198	30 November 2013	Lee Tae-min and Na-eun have a traditional wedding ceremony. Joon-young and Yu-mi's Japan trip continues. Yoonhan and So-yeon check their skin condition, receive massages and learn how to dance the tango.
199	7 December 2013	Yoonhan has a romantic surprise for So-yeon. Lee Tae-min and Na-eun's traditional wedding continues. Joon-young and Yu-mi continue their trip in Japan.
200	14 December 2013	Yoonhan and So-yeon have a wedding by themselves in Jeju Island. Lee Tae-min and Na-eun open up a joint bank account and visit an amusement park. Continuing their Japan trip, Joon-young and Yu-mi visit a goya farm and restaurant.
201	21 December 2013	Lee Tae-min and Na-eun celebrate Christmas together by visiting a ski resort. Joon-young and Yu-mi receive a mission to host a Christmas party with friends. Yoonhan and So-yeon spend the day together after their wedding ceremony.
202	28 December 2013	Lee Tae-min and Na-eun continue their date at the ski resort. Joon-young and Yu-mi have their Christmas party with their friends. Yoonhan and So-yeon decorate their house.
203	4 January 2014	Lee Tae-min and Na-eun's virtual marriage concludes. Joon-young and Yu-mi go to couples counseling. Yoonhan and So-yeon continue to settle into their home as they go shopping and cook together.
204	11 January 2014	Yoonhan and So-yeon go on a date in Myeong-dong. Yu-mi meets Joon-young's brother. Jang Wooyoung and Park Se-young meet for the first time.
205	18 January 2014	Yoonhan and So-yeon record a duet song. Yu-mi treats Joon-young to an expensive meal while they argue over who won the better award. Wooyoung and Se-young's first meeting continues.
206	25 January 2014	Yoonhan and So-yeon invite Joon-young and Yu-mi to their home as a housewarming party. Wooyoung and Se-young travel to Chuncheon for their honeymoon.
207	1 February 2014	Yoonhan, So-yeon, Joon-young and Yu-mi continue to spend time together until they switch houses with each other. Wooyoung and Se-young go ice fishing, sledding and visit a jewelry store in Chuncheon.
208	8 February 2014	Joon-young and Yu-mi go on a trip to Jeju Island. Yoonhan and So-yeon have a date in a bookstore then go to an art museum. Wooyoung and Se-young go furniture shopping.
209	15 February 2014	Yu-mi and Joon-young's Jeju Island trip continues. Wooyoung and Se-young make furniture for their home.
210	22 February 2014	Joon-young and Yu-mi celebrate both their birthdays in a joint party. Yoonhan and So-yeon enjoy a date in a cafe followed by an open-air spa. Wooyoung and Se-young continue shopping for furniture and decorations for their home.
211	1 March 2014	Yoonhan and So-yeon try out a session of couples yoga together. Yu-mi's mother pays a visit to the couple's home. Wooyoung and Se-young settle into their home and cook their first meal together.
212	8 March 2014	Yoonhan and So-yeon have a date in Hongdae. Yu-mi's mother's visit continues and then the couple prepares for their wedding photoshoot. Wooyoung and Se-young get driving lessons from Jinwoon, and then all three of them spend some time together.
213	15 March 2014	Yoonhan and So-yeon's virtual marriage concludes. Joon-young and Yu-mi have their wedding photoshoot. Wooyoung and Se-young have a barbecue as their housewarming party.
214	22 March 2014	Joon-young and Yu-mi continue their wedding photoshoot. Wooyoung and Se-young watch a movie in bed after their barbecue. They also visit a recording studio to record a duet. Namkoong Min and Hong Jin-young meet for the first time.
215	29 March 2014	Joon-young and Yu-mi's wedding album arrives. Min and Jin-young's first meeting continues as they have a date in Daehangno.
216	5 April 2014	Wooyoung and Se-young go to a gym to workout together. Joon-young and Yu-mi visit a traditional village center. Min and Jin-young begin searching for a house.
217	12 April 2014	Joon-young surprises Yu-mi with a visit to her drama's set. Wooyoung and Se-young go to an amusement park. Min and Jin-young meet with Jin-young's friends.
218	3 May 2014	Joon-young and Yu-mi spend time with his friends at a basketball court. Se-young meets Wooyoung's friends and then mother during their trip in Busan. Min, Jin-young, Wooyoung and Se-young visit the Radio Star set.
219	10 May 2014	Joon-young and Yu-mi visit a herb farm and then enjoy a variety of teas. Wooyoung and Se-young go to Singapore for their honeymoon. Min and Jin-young go to Saipan for their honeymoon.
220	17 May 2014	Joon-young and Yu-mi go on a date along with her family's dog. Wooyoung and Se-young have a wedding ceremony during their honeymoon. Min and Jin-young continue their honeymoon and are given a mission to prepare for their wedding.
221	24 May 2014	Wooyoung and Se-young go on a date at an aquarium. Min and Jin-young have their wedding ceremony on a yacht.
222	31 May 2014	Joon-young and Yu-mi's virtual marriage concludes. Se-young prepares a surprise birthday meal for Wooyoung. Min temporarily moves into Jin-young's home.
223	7 June 2014	Hong Jong-hyun and Yura meet for the first time. Wooyoung and Se-young go to the studio to record their duet. They receive a mission to have a wedding reception with their friends, including 2PM's Junho and Chansung. Min and Jin-young go shopping for ingredients then prepare their first meal together.
224	14 June 2014	Jong-hyun and Yura spend their honeymoon camping in an RV. Wooyoung and Se-young continue spending time with their friends. They receive a mission to go on a camping trip. Jin-young meets Min's friends.
225	21 June 2014	Jong-hyun and Yura continue their honeymoon. Wooyoung and Se-young continue their camping trip. The gathering with Min's friends continues.
226	28 June 2014	All couples prepare food for the competition.
227	5 July 2014	Wooyoung and Se-young promote their song. Jong-hyun and Yura move into their new home. Min and Jin-young go on farming date.
228	12 July 2014	Wooyoung and Se-young continue to promote their song. Jong-hyun and Yura prepare to move into their new home. Min and Jin-young celebrate their 100th day together.
229	19 July 2014	Wooyoung and Se-young wash blankets together and practice their song's choreography. Jong-hyun and Yura finish unpacking and settle into their home. Min and Jin-young have a romantic dinner for their 100th day together.
230	26 July 2014	Wooyoung and Se-young go hiking. Jong-hyun and Yura explore their new neighborhood. Min, Jin-young, Jong-hyun and Yura compete with each other in couple games.
231	2 August 2014	Wooyoung and Se-young lose their home and visit the JYP Entertainment practice room. The couple games between Min with Jin-young and Jong-hyun with Yura continue.
232	9 August 2014	Wooyoung and Se-young practice their song at a karaoke room. Jong-hyun surprises Yura with a visit to the Girl's Day practice room. Min starts to show his jealousy. The results of the cooking competition are revealed.
233	16 August 2014	Wooyoung gives Se-young some birthday surprises. Jong-hyun and Yura meet with Hong Suk-chun. Min and Jin-young continue their military training.
234	23 August 2014	Wooyoung and Se-young go on a biking trip. Jong-hyun and Yura continue their meeting with Hong Suk-chun. Later, Jong-hyun visits Yura's rehearsal. Min and Jin-young move into their new house. Later, Min gives Jin-young a birthday surprise.
235	30 August 2014	Wooyoung and Se-young continue their outdoor adventure. Jong-hyun prepares a feast for Yura and Girl's Day. Min and Jin-young visit Jin-young's hometown.
236	6 September 2014	Wooyoung and Se-young receive a mission for Chuseok. Jong-hyun and Yura continue to spend time with the Girl's Day members. Min and Jin-young have a street date and go to a baseball game.
237	13 September 2014	Wooyoung and Se-young's virtual marriage concludes. Jong-hyun and Yura continue playing games. Min and Jin-young visit Jin-young's parents.
238	20 September 2014	Song Jae-rim and Kim So-eun meet for the first time. Jong-hyun and Yura go on a trip to Jeungdo. Jin-young joins Min at his drama's set to film a cameo.
239	27 September 2014	Jong-hyun and Yura celebrate their 100th day together. Jae-rim and So-eun continue their first meeting. Min and Jin-young prepare to meet with Min's brother and his brother's wife.
240	4 October 2014	Jong-hyun and Yura have their wedding photoshoot. Jae-rim and So-eun's first meeting continues. Later, So-eun visits Jae-rim in the hospital. Min and Jin-young continue to prepare for their meeting with Min's brother and his brother's wife.
241	11 October 2014	Jong-hyun and Yura finish their trip. So-eun's visit to Jae-rim in the hospital continues. Later, they spend time together at home. Min and Jin-young meet with Min's brother and his brother's wife.
242	18 October 2014	Jong-hyun and Yura go on a radio show. Jae-rim and So-eun go shopping for decorations and furniture. Min and Jin-young celebrate their 200th day together.
243	25 October 2014	Jong-hyun brings Yura for a visit to his school. Jae-rim and So-eun continue to work on their home. Min and Jin-young's 200th day celebration continues.
244	1 November 2014	Jong-hyun and Yura's trip to see his past continues. Jae-rim and So-eun receive a mission to do something that will help them become closer. Min and Jin-young's 200th day celebration wraps up and the movie they filmed is revealed.
245	8 November 2014	Jong-hyun and Yura try out couples yoga. Jae-rim and So-eun go fishing. Min makes a cameo appearance in Jin-young's music video.
246	15 November 2014	Yura meets Jong-hyun's friends. Jae-rim and So-eun start to invite people for their housewarming party. Min and Jin-young record their duet.
247	22 November 2014	Jong-hyun gives Yura a surprise birthday party. Jae-rim and So-eun have a couple photoshoot. Min and Jin-young go on a picnic.
248	29 November 2014	Jong-hyun and Yura travel to Ulsan to meet Yura's parents. Jae-rim and So-eun prepare for their wedding. Jin-young and Min try to give each other a massage. Later, they watch a horror movie.
249	6 December 2014	Jong-hyun and Yura's visit to Yura's parents continues. Jae-rim and So-eun have their wedding ceremony. Min and Jin-young play pool and later start cleaning their house.
250	13 December 2014	Jong-hyun and Yura go on a trip to Bali. Jae-rim and So-eun have their wedding reception and later go camping. Min and Jin-young go to the gym and then prepare for a Christmas party.
251	20 December 2014	Jong-hyun and Yura's trip to Bali continues. So-eun decides to do anything Jae-rim wants for a day. Min and Jin-young continue their Christmas party and go on a trip to Macau.
252	27 December 2014	Jong-hyun and Yura's Bali trip continues. Jae-rim and So-eun travel to Turkey for their honeymoon. Min and Jin-young's Macau trip continues.
253	3 January 2015	Jong-hyun and Yura finish their Bali trip and then celebrate their 200th day together. Jae-rim and So-eun's honeymoon in Turkey continues. Min and Jin-young's Macau trip continues.
254	10 January 2015	Jong-hyun and Yura go shopping to prepare for winter. Jae-rim and So-eun's honeymoon in Turkey continues. Min and Jin-young continue their trip.
255	17 January 2015	Jong-hyun surprises Yura with a visit as she prepares for the '2014 MBC Entertainment Awards'. Jae-rim and So-eun's honeymoon in Turkey continues. Min and Jin-young finish their Macau trip.
256	24 January 2015	Jong-hyun and Yura invite the other two couples to their home before the awards ceremony. Jae-rim and So-eun finish their honeymoon trip. Min and Jin-young travel to Jeongdongjin to see the sunrise.
257	31 January 2015	Jong-hyun and Yura discuss their New Year's resolutions and exercise together. Jae-rim and So-eun make and pass out goldfish bread to show their gratitude towards their fans. Min and Jin-young's trip to Jeongdongjin continues.
258	7 February 2015	Jong-hyun and Yura go ice skating. Jae-rim and So-eun go on a date wearing school uniforms. Min and Jin-young's trip to Jeongdongjin continues.
259	14 February 2015	After addressing a recent issue, Yura surprises Jong-hyun with gifts. Min and Jin-young go sledding then spend time together at home. Jae-rim and So-eun talked about the article released earlier that day.
260	21 February 2015	Jong-hyun and Yura celebrate the Lunar New Year. So-eun becomes Jae-rim's manager for a day. Min and Jin-young watch a movie. Later, Min prepares a special event for their 300th day together.
261	28 February 2015	Jong-hyun and Yura go on a trip to Namiseom Island. Jae-rim and So-eun go to a basketball game. Min and Jin-young have a date at an amusement park.
262	7 March 2015	Jong-hyun and Yura's virtual marriage concludes. Jae-rim and So-eun go on a trip to Jeju Island. Min and Jin-young's virtual marriage concludes.
263	14 March 2015	So-eun gives Jae-rim a birthday surprise as their Jeju Island trip continues. The new couples are not set yet as Lee Jong-hyun, Henry Lau, Gong Seung-yeon and Kim Ye-won must choose their partner themselves after going on dates with both options.
264	21 March 2015	Jae-rim and So-eun's Jeju Island trip continues. The potential new couples switch partners for their second dates. Later, everyone needs to pick their partner and will only begin their virtual marriage if they choose each other.
265	28 March 2015	Jae-rim and So-eun move out to a new home. Jong-hyun and Seung-yeon meet up in Japan.
266	4 April 2015	Jae-rim and So-eun settle into their new home. Jong-hyun and Seung-yeon spend their first night together. Henry has a romantic surprise for Ye-won.
267	11 April 2015	Jae-rim and So-eun tend to their garden. Jong-hyun and Seung-yeon continue to spend time together in Japan. Henry and Ye-won go to an amusement park.
268	18 April 2015	Jae-rim and So-eun go to a drive-in theater. Jong-hyun and Seung-yeon continue spending time together in Japan. Henry invites Ye-won to his apartment.
269	25 April 2015	Jae-rim and So-eun prepare to go on a picnic. Jong-hyun and Seung-yeon spend their last day in Japan. Henry and Ye-won move into their new home.
270	2 May 2015	Jae-rim and So-eun go on a picnic. Jong-hyun and Seung-yeon settle into their new home. Henry and Ye-won spend time together in their new home.
271	9 May 2015	Jae-rim and So-eun go on a trip to Wonju. Jong-hyun and Seung-yeon spend time together at home. Later, Seung-yeon prepares a surprise for Jong-hyun. Henry and Ye-won spend time together at home. They then invite their friends to a housewarming party.
272	16 May 2015	Jae-rim and So-eun stay at a temple. Jong-hyun and Seung-yeon continue their meeting with Seung-yeon's father. f(x)'s Amber and VIXX's N visit Henry and Ye-won's home.
273	23 May 2015	Jae-rim and So-eun go to Seoul to practice kendo and then go shopping. Jong-hyun and Seung-yeon have their first photoshoot as a couple for a magazine. Henry and Ye-won go to a street market.
274	6 June 2015	Jae-rim and So-eun go bungee jumping. Jong-hyun and Seung-yeon go on a date while wearing school uniforms. Henry and Ye-won have a date in Hongdae then watch a movie at home.
275	13 June 2015	Jae-rim and So-eun's virtual marriage concludes. Seung-yeon meets Jong-hyun's fellow CNBLUE members. Eric Nam and Chloë Grace Moretz visit Henry and Ye-won as the couple has their final meeting. Their virtual marriage concludes.
276	20 June 2015	Jong-hyun and Seung-yeon visit Jong-hyun's hometown of Busan. Oh Min-suk and Kang Ye-won meet for the first time. Yook Sungjae and Joy meet for the first time.
277	27 June 2015	Seung-yeon meets Jong-hyun's family during their trip to Busan. Min-suk and Ye-won's first meeting continues. Sungjae and Joy's first meeting continues.
278	4 July 2015	Seung-yeon gives Jong-hyun birthday surprises. Min-suk and Ye-won spend their first morning as husband and wife together as their honeymoon continues. Sungjae and Joy have a street date.
279	11 July 2015	Jong-hyun and Seung-yeon go to a baseball game. Later, they prepare for their wedding ceremony. Min-suk gives Ye-won a bike riding lesson. Sungjae and Joy visit an arcade and a karaoke room. Later, they head to their new home.
280	18 July 2015	Jong-hyun and Seung-yeon have their wedding. Min-suk and Ye-won search for a home. Sungjae and Joy move into their new home.
281	25 July 2015	Jong-hyun and Seung-yeon's wedding continues. Ye-won meets Min-suk's friends. Later, they move into their new home. Joy meets Sungjae's fellow BTOB members. Later, they settle into their home.
282	1 August 2015	Jong-hyun and Seung-yeon go swimming on their rooftop and then visit Jong-hyun's brother's cafe. Min-suk and Ye-won continue moving into their new home. Sungjae and Joy decorate their home and have a meal on their rooftop.
283	8 August 2015	All three couples are given a mission to watch a horror movie.
284	15 August 2015	Jong-hyun and Seung-yeon go on a trip to Jeju Island. Min-suk and Ye-won practice scuba diving and then have a family photoshoot. Sungjae and Joy leave on a train to have a 1-night and 2-day trip at a farm village.
285	22 August 2015	Jong-hyun and Seung-yeon continue their Jeju Island trip. Min-suk and Ye-won's family photoshoot continues. Later, they spend time together at home. Sungjae and Joy continue their countryside trip.
286	29 August 2015	Jong-hyun and Seung-yeon's virtual marriage concludes. Min-suk surprises Ye-won with a visit to her movie set. Sungjae and Joy's countryside trip continues.
287	5 September 2015	Min-suk and Ye-won take Romi to a veterinarian. Sungjae and Joy continue their countryside trip. Kwak Si-yang and Kim So-yeon meet for the first time.
288	12 September 2015	Min-suk and Ye-won go to a flying yoga session together. Sungjae surprises Joy with a visit to SM's practice room where Red Velvet members are gathered. Si-yang and So-yeon's first meeting continues as they spend time at home.
289	19 September 2015	Min-suk and Ye-won see a couple's therapist and then have a date in Myeong-dong. Sungjae and Joy go out to a club to celebrate Joy's birthday. Si-yang and So-yeon spend their first night together.
290	26 September 2015	All of the couples celebrate Chuseok.
291	3 October 2015	Min-suk and Ye-won visit a nail shop. Sungjae and Joy continue their Chuseok celebration and then volunteer at an abandoned dog shelter. Si-yang and So-yeon go shopping and then karaoke.
292	17 October 2015	Min-suk and Ye-won visit a spa. Sungjae and Joy get driving lessons. Later, they meet with Joy's friends. Si-yang and So-yeon prepare for a housewarming party.
293	24 October 2015	Min-suk and Ye-won go on a dinner date. Sungjae and Joy continue their meeting with Amber and Kangin. Si-yang and So-yeon's housewarming party continues.
294	7 November 2015	Min-suk and Ye-won go rollerskating and have a picnic. Sungjae and Joy go to Han River for a date. Si-yang and So-yeon go to a baseball game.
295	14 November 2015	Min-suk and Ye-won visit the recording studio to record their song. Sungjae and Joy travel to their wedding ceremony along with the BTOB and Red Velvet members. Si-yang and So-yeon go on a camping trip.
296	21 November 2015	Min-suk and Ye-won record their song. Sungjae and Joy have their wedding ceremony. Si-yang and So-yeon continue their camping trip.
297	28 November 2015	Min-suk and Ye-won have a date inside of a cave. Sungjae and Joy enjoy the amusement park along with the other BTOB and Red Velvet members. Si-yang surprises So-yeon with events for her birthday.
298	5 December 2015	Min-suk and Ye-won perform their song in public for the first time. Sungjae and Joy travel to Jeju Island for their honeymoon. Si-yang continues to surprise So-yeon with events for her birthday.
299	12 December 2015	Min-suk and Ye-won visit a ski resort. Sungjae and Joy continue their Jeju Island honeymoon. Si-yang and So-yeon work together to build their own comic book store in their home.
300	19 December 2015	All couples participate in a calendar photoshoot challenge in order to celebrate the 300th episode since the show separated from the Sunday Sunday Night program.
301	26 December 2015	Min-suk and Ye-won spend time together at home. Sungjae and Joy prepare for their '2015 MBC Entertainment Awards' performance. Si-yang and So-yeon celebrate their 100th day of marriage.
302	2 January 2016	Min-suk and Ye-won pass out rice cakes then visit a salon and Ye-won's new art studio. Sungjae and Joy arrive in Hainan for their trip. Si-yang and So-yeon have to decide whether to continue their marriage.
303	9 January 2016	Min-suk and Ye-won welcome a new puppy in their home. Sungjae and Joy continue their trip in Hainan. Si-yang and So-yeon have a photoshoot together.
304	16 January 2016	Si-yang and So-yeon record a song with G.NA's help. Min-suk and Ye-won take Romi and Yomi to a veterinarian. Sungjae and Joy's Hainan trip continues. All couples attend the '2015 MBC Entertainment Awards'.
305	23 January 2016	Si-yang and So-yeon test their fitness levels. Min-suk and Ye-won spend time at home. Sungjae and Joy's Hainan trip continues.
306	30 January 2016	So-yeon prepares Si-yang's surprise birthday party. Min-suk and Ye-won try out belly dancing together. Sungjae and Joy's Hainan trip continues.
307	6 February 2016	So-yeon and Si-yang act together for a cameo in a drama. Min-suk and Ye-won celebrates Yomy's birthday. Sungjae and Joy go to a museum for inspiration for their song.
308	13 February 2016	So-yeon and Si-yang go on a surprise trip. Min-suk and Ye-won have their wedding ceremony. Sungjae and Joy have a live broadcast on the internet.
309	20 February 2016	So-yeon and Si-yang's surprise trip continues. Min-suk and Ye-won spend their time in Taean. Sungjae and Joy's live broadcast continues.
310	27 February 2016	So-yeon and Si-yang's surprise trip continues. Sungjae and Joy spend their time at home. Min-suk and Ye-won's virtual marriage concludes.
311	5 March 2016	Si-yang and So-yeon bake cookies and muffins at home. Sungjae makes a surprise event for Joy. Jo Se-ho and Cao Lu meet for the first time.
312	12 March 2016	Si-yang makes a surprise visit to So-yeon's drama conference. Sungjae and Joy record their couple song. Jo Se-ho and Cao Lu's meeting of the families between members and friends.
313	19 March 2016	Cao Lu moves in with Se-ho. Si-yang So-yeon visit a pet cafe. Sungjae and Joy try to learn how to cook.
314	26 March 2016	Cao Lu and Se-ho go on their first date on her campus then visit a doctor for Saeho's athlete's foot. Si-yang and So-yeon shop for each other and spent their time at home. Sungjae and Joy do their spring cleaning.
315	2 April 2016	Bbyu couple and Si-So couple have a couple bowling match.
316	9 April 2016	Se-ho and Cao Lu go on a date at an amusement park. Sungjae and Joy promote their albums at the MBC Building. Si-yang and So-yeon's virtual marriage concludes.
317	16 April 2016	Eric Nam and Solar meet for the first time. Se-ho and Cao Lu continue their amusement park date. Sungjae and Joy record their couple song music video.
318	23 April 2016	Se-ho and Cao Lu travels to China to meet Cao Lu's parents. Eric and Solar spend their time at a cafe. Joy gives Sungjae a special massage.
319	30 April 2016	Se-ho and Cao Lu go to the mountains, then go to the night market. Eric and Solar have their first date to see cherry blossoms. Sungjae and Joy have a school date.
320	7 May 2016	Cao Lu and Se-ho have a traditional Miao wedding. Eric and Solar visit an oriental medical clinic. Sungjae and Joy's virtual marriage concludes.
321	14 May 2016	Jin-kyung and Jota meet for the first time. Cao Lu and Se-ho's wedding continues. Eric and Solar teach each other English and Korean.
322	21 May 2016	Jin-kyung and Jota have their wedding. Eric and Solar look for their new apartment. Se-ho and Cao Lu go to the gym.
323	28 May 2016	Eric and Solar move in together in their new apartment. Jota teaches Jin-kyung judo. Se-ho's parents visit the couple.
324	4 June 2016	Jin-kyung and Jota go on a date. Eric cooks for Solar. Se-ho and Cao Lu shop together to decorate their extra room. Later, Eric proposes to Solar.
325	11 June 2016	Jota gets his license and has a car wash date with Jin-kyung. Eric and Solar have their self-wedding in the street. Nam Chang-hee stays over at Se-ho and Cao Lu's apartment.
326	18 June 2016	Jin-kyung and Jota go to N Seoul Tower and then visit a pottery shop. Eric and Solar go on a date at Gyeongbokgung. Cao Lu's father visits the couple.
327	25 June 2016	Jin-kyung and Jota spend time at their new home. Mamamoo members visit the couple. Se-ho and Cao Lu go on a date.
328	2 July 2016	Jin-kyung and Jota cook together. Eric and Solar go to Jeju Island for a vacation. Se-ho and Cao Lu have a double date trip with Nam Chang-hee and Fiestar member Yezi.
329	9 July 2016	Eric and Solar's vacation concludes. Jin-kyung visits Jota at work and meets the members of MADTOWN. Cao Lu and Se-ho's trip continues.
330	16 July 2016	Jin-kyung and Jota start their two days one night trip by going figure skating. Eric lets Solar try out different meals unknown to her by having a food road trip. Se-ho and Cao Lu conclude their trip.
331	23 July 2016	Jin-kyung and Jota spend their first night together. Eric Nam and Solar create a joint bank account under Solar's name and set up a bar at their apartment. Se-ho and Cao Lu visit a dermatologist. Later, they visit a comic book café from the drama Se-ho appeared in.
332	30 July 2016	Jin-kyung and Jota's trip concludes. Solar initiates a 'Husband Helping Day' to promote Eric's new single. Se-ho and Cao Lu visit a dance school.
333	6 August 2016	Jin-kyung and Jota give cookies to neighbours and visit an arcade. The studio panel visits Solar and Eric at their apartment. Se-ho and Cao Lu visit a waterpark together with Se-ho's niece and nephew.
334	13 August 2016	Eric and Solar host a radio show together. Jin-kyung and Jota participate in a photo shoot together. Se-ho and Cao Lu spend time with Se-ho's niece and nephew at their apartment.
335	20 August 2016	Jin-kyung's mother and sister visit the couple at their apartment. Eric and Solar babysit three dogs and go to a dog park together. Se-ho and Cao Lu celebrate Cao Lu's birthday at a restaurant.
336	27 August 2016	Eric and Solar wash the dogs, visit a sauna, and make kimchi. Jin-kyung and Jota visit a muscat farm together with their mother-in-law and sister-in-law. Cao Lu's mother visits the couple in Korea.
337	3 September 2016	Eric and Solar finish the kimchi, send it to Solar's sister in London, and make shirts. Jin-kyung and Jota catch eels. Se-ho's parents meet Cao Lu's mother. At the end, all three couples are invited to a We Got Married Gathering: a team building rally for Chuseok.
338	10 September 2016	Yang Se-chan and Park Na-rae (panelists) begin a virtual marriage for this event only and join the three couples at the team building rally.
339	17 September 2016	The team building rally of the four couples concludes.
340	24 September 2016	Eric and Solar visit a winter amusement park. Jin-kyung and Jota set up a double blind date for MADTOWN member Lee Geon and model Song Hae na. Jo Se-ho and Cao Lu's virtual marriage concludes.
341	1 October 2016	Jin-kyung and Jota's double date concludes. Eric and Solar make furniture. Choi Tae-joon and Yoon Bo-mi meet for the first time.
342	8 October 2016	Jin-kyung and Jota do ballet together. Eric and Solar pick up chestnuts and harvest sweet potatoes. Tae-joon and Bo-mi participate in a maze game in order to get the keys to their future apartment.
343	15 October 2016	Jin-kyung and Jota have a picnic in the countryside. Tae-joon and Bo-mi go hiking together. Eric and Solar go to Dubai for their luxury trip.
344	22 October 2016	Jin-kyung and Jota's picnic concludes. Tae-joon and Bo-mi arrive at their new apartment. Eric and Solar's Dubai trip continues.
345	29 October 2016	Jin-kyung and Jota tries rock climbing and later, Jota attends Seoul Fashion Week where Jin-kyung models the S/S collection. Eric and Solar's trip continues. Tae-Joon and Bo-mi shop for furniture.
346	5 November 2016	Jin-kyung and Jota have a hanbok date around Seoul. Eric and Solar's trip in Dubai concludes. Tae-joon and Bo-mi decorate their new apartment.
347	12 November 2016	Jin-kyung and Jota go to Busan to visit Jota's father. Eric and Solar have a street date. Tae-joon and Bo-mi have their wedding ceremony.
348	19 November 2016	Eric Nam and Solar's virtual marriage concludes. Jin-kyung and Jota go on a backpacking trip. Tae-joon and Bo-mi's wedding ceremony continues.
349	26 November 2016	Jin-kyung and Jota plays with dolphins. Tae-joon and Bo-mi have a couple photo shoot for their wedding photos. Sleepy and Lee Guk-joo meet for the first time.
350	3 December 2016	Jota and Kim Jin-kyung's virtual marriage concludes. Tae-joon and Bo-mi visits Bomi's family. Guk-joo and Sleepy have their wedding ceremony.
351	10 December 2016	Gong Myung and Jung Hye-sung meet for the first time. Tae-joon and Bo-mi go around her hometown. Guk-joo and Sleepy clean their apartment.
352	17 December 2016	Tae-joon and Bo-mi spends some time at home. Myung and Hye-sung have a date at the ski resort. Guk-joo and Sleepy go to the gym.
353	24 December 2016	Hye-sung visits Myung at his apartment. Tae-joon and Bo-mi decorate for Christmas. Guk-joo's mom and brother visits the couple.
354	31 December 2016	Tae-joon and Bo-mi go camping near the sea. Myung and Hye-sung goe to Myung's old neighborhood. Sleepy makes a surprise event for Guk-joo.
355	7 January 2017	Tae-joon and Bo-mi's camping continues. Myung and Hye-sung meet her father. Guk-joo and Sleepy prepare for their performance at the MBC Awards 2016. Later, all the couples meet up for the event including SamSam couple, Ddong-ie couple and CaoCao couple.
356	14 January 2017	Myung and Hye-sung go house hunting for their new home. Tae-joon accompanies Bo-mi to get her driving license. Sleepy surprises Guk-joo for her birthday.
357	21 January 2017	Tae-joon's brother goes to visit the couple. Myung and Hye-sung move into their new house. Sleepy and Guk-joo go on a market date.
358	28 January 2017	All the couples gather at Guk-joo and Sleepy's place for the Lunar New Year. Later, they play against each other in a game of bowling.
359	4 February 2017	Sleepy helps as a part-timer at Guk-joo's new shop. Apink members visit Tae-joon and Bo-mi. 5urprise members Yoo Il, Seo Kang-joon and Kang Tae-oh meet up with Myung and Hye-sung.
360	11 February 2017	Tae-joon and Bo-mi celebrates their 100th day anniversary with the Apink members. Myung surprises Hye-sung with an event. Guk-joo accompany Sleepy to the hospital to remove his corns.
361	18 February 2017	Myung and Hye-sung go on a trip. Tae-joon and Bo-mi go to eat their favorite spicy food. Guk-joo and Sleepy go on a winter trip.
362	25 February 2017	Tae-joon and Bo-mi go on a sauna date. Myung and Hye-sung's trip concludes. Guk-joo and Sleepy's trip concludes too.
363	4 March 2017	Choi Tae-joon and Yoon Bo-mi's virtual marriage concludes. NCT's Doyoung visits Myung and Hye-sung. Guk-joo and Sleepy sell some stuff to pay off the bills.
364	11 March 2017	Myung and Hye-sung celebrate their 100th day anniversary. Sleepy celebrates his birthday with Guk-joo and his friends. Choi Min-yong and Jang Do-yeon meet for the first time.
365	18 March 2017	Myung goes with Hye-sung to attend her class at Sungkyunkwan University. Sleepy goes as a guest at Guk-joo's work. Min-young and Do-yeon starts their island village married life.
366	25 March 2017	Myung and Hye-sung does taekwondo. Guk-joo meets Sleepy's father. Min-young and Do-yeon goes to a mudflat.
367	1 April 2017	Sleepy and Guk-joo visits Lee Kye-in's home in the countryside. Min-young and Do-yeon goes around the village.
368	8 April 2017	Myung and Hye-sung have a small wedding. Sleepy and Guk-joo works in the country side. Min-young and Do-yeon goes fishing.
369	15 April 2017	Myung and Hye-sung enjoys Jeju Island after their wedding. Guk-joo and Sleepy takes Pyu-ri to the vet and later met with Kim Jung-mo with his pet Henry. Min-young and Do-yeon spends time at home.
370	22 April 2017	Hye-sung and Myung enjoys a party for two. Sleepy and Guk-joo goes to Japan for their honeymoon. Min-young and Do-yeon listens to the radio where they sent their letter.
371	29 April 2017	Myung and Hye-sung goes on a haunted house date and then prepared and sent gifts to those who congratulated them on their wedding. Guk-joo and Sleepy's trip continues. Do-yeon surprises Min-young with an event for his birthday.
372	6 May 2017	Sleepy and Lee Guk-joo's virtual marriage concludes. Gong Myung and Jung Hye-sung's virtual marriage concludes.
373	13 May 2017	Choi Min-yong and Jang Do-yeon's virtual marriage concludes.
