= 2016 SBS Drama Awards =

24th edition of award ceremony

- Date: December 31, 2016
- Site: SBS Prism Tower, Sangam-dong, Mapo District, Seoul
- Hosted by: Main: Lee Hwi-jae; Jang Keun-suk; Bang Min-ah; Special: Boom; Jung Chae-yeon

Television coverage
- Network: SBS
- Duration: 260 minutes

The 2016 SBS Drama Awards, presented by Seoul Broadcasting System (SBS), took place on December 31, 2016 at SBS Prism Tower, Sangam-dong, Mapo District, Seoul. It was hosted by Lee Hwi-jae, Jang Keun-suk and Minah.

== Winners and nominees ==
(Winners denoted in bold)

Grand Prize (Daesang)
**Han Suk-kyu** - **Dr. Romantic** as **Teacher Kim/Boo Yong-joo**
Top Excellence Award, Actor in a Genre & Fantasy Drama	Top Excellence Award, Actress in a Genre & Fantasy Drama
**Kim Rae-won** - **The Doctors** as **Hong Ji-hong**; **Lee Min-ho** - **The Legend of the Blue Sea** as **Kim Dam-ryung/Heo Joon-jae**; Han Suk-kyu - Dr. Romantic as Teacher Kim/Boo Yong-joo; Lee Joon-gi - Moon Lovers: Scarlet Heart Ryeo as Prince Wang So	**Park Shin-hye** - **The Doctors** as **Yoo Hye-jung**; Jun Ji-hyun - The Legend of the Blue Sea as Se-hwa/Shim Cheong; Kim Sung-ryung - Mrs. Cop 2 as Goo Yoon-jeong; Park Min-young - Remember as Lee In-ah
Top Excellence Award, Actor in a Romantic-Comedy Drama	Top Excellence Award, Actress in a Romantic-Comedy Drama
**Jo Jung-suk** - **Don't Dare to Dream** as **Lee Hwa-shin**; **Namkoong Min** - **Beautiful Gong Shim** as **Ahn Dan-tae/Seok Joon-pyo**; Go Kyung-pyo - Don't Dare to Dream as Go Jeong-won; Ji Sung - Entertainer as Shin Seok-ho	**Gong Hyo-jin** - **Don't Dare to Dream** as **Pyo Na-ri**; Kim Hee-ae - Second to Last Love as Kang Min-joo; Lee Hye-ri - Entertainer as Jung Geu-rin; Lee Mi-sook - Don't Dare to Dream as Gye Sung-sook
Top Excellence Award, Actor in a Serial Drama	Top Excellence Award, Actress in a Serial Drama
**Jang Keun-suk** - **The Royal Gambler** as **Baek Dae-gil**; Choi Min-soo - The Royal Gambler as King Sukjong; Seo Ji-seok - Witch's Castle as Shin Kang-hyun; Song Jae-hee - You Are a Gift as Ma Sung-jin	**Kim Hae-sook** - **Yeah, That's The Way It Is** as **Han Hye-kyung**; Choi Myung-gil - You Are a Gift as Eun Young-ae; Go Doo-shim - Our Gap-soon as In Nae-shim; Yoon Jin-seo - The Royal Gambler as Suk-bin Choe
Excellence Award, Actor in a Fantasy Drama	Excellence Award, Actress in a Fantasy Drama
**Kang Ha-neul** - **Moon Lovers: Scarlet Heart Ryeo** as **Prince Wang Wook**; Hong Jong-hyun - Moon Lovers: Scarlet Heart Ryeo as Prince Wang Yo; Kim In-kwon - Come Back Mister as Kim Young-soo; Lee Hee-joon - The Legend of the Blue Sea as Jo Nam-doo	**Oh Yeon-seo** - **Come Back Mister** as **Han Hong-nan/Han Gi-tak**; Hwang Shin-hye - The Legend of the Blue Sea as Kang Seo-hee; Kang Han-na - Moon Lovers: Scarlet Heart Ryeo as Hwangbo Yeon-hwa; Shin Hye-sun - The Legend of the Blue Sea as Cha Shi-ah
Excellence Award, Actor in a Genre Drama	Excellence Award, Actress in a Genre Drama
**Yoo Seung-ho** - **Remember** as **Seo Jin-woo**; **Yoo Yeon-seok** - **Dr. Romantic** as **Kang Dong-joo**; Kim Bum - Mrs. Cop 2 as Lee Ro-joon; Yoon Kyun-sang - The Doctors as Jung Yoon-do	**Seo Hyun-jin** - **Dr. Romantic** as **Yoon Seo-jeong**; Jin Kyung - Dr. Romantic as Oh Myung-shim; Park Hyo-joo - Wanted as Yeon Woo-shin; Son Dam-bi - Mrs. Cop 2 as Shin Yeo-ok
Excellence Award, Actor in a Romantic-Comedy Drama	Excellence Award, Actress in a Romantic-Comedy Drama
**Kang Min-hyuk** - **Entertainer** as **Jo Ha-neul**; Jeon No-min - Entertainer as Lee Joon-seok; Ji Jin-hee - Second to Last Love as Go Sang-sik; Lee Sung-jae - Don't Dare to Dream as Kim Rak	**Bang Min-ah** - **Beautiful Gong Shim** as **Gong Shim**; Chae Jung-an - Entertainer as Yeo Min-joo; Kim Seul-gi - Second to Last Love as Go Mi-rye; Park Ji-young - Don't Dare to Dream as Bang Ja-young
Excellence Award, Actor in a Serial Drama	Excellence Award, Actress in a Serial Drama
**Yeo Jin-goo** - **The Royal Gambler** as **Prince Yeoning**; Jo Han-sun - Yeah, That's The Way It Is as Yoo Se-hyun; Lee Wan - Our Gap-soon as Shin Se-gye; Shim Ji-ho - You Are a Gift as Han Yoon-ho/Lee Woo-jin	**Kim Ji-young** - **Here Comes Love** as **Lee Eun-hee**; Choi Jung-won - Witch's Castle as Oh Dan-byul/Jin Dal-rae; Kim Gyu-ri - Our Gap-soon as Heo Da-hae; Yoon So-yi - Yeah, That's The Way It Is as Yoo Se-hee
Special Award, Actor in a Fantasy Drama	Special Award, Actress in a Fantasy Drama
**Sung Dong-il** - **The Legend of the Blue Sea** as **Lord Yang/Ma Dae-young**; Kim Sung-kyun - Moon Lovers: Scarlet Heart Ryeo as Choi Ji-mong; Lee Ji-hoon - The Legend of the Blue Sea as Heo Chi-hyun; Yoon Park - Come Back Mister as Jung Ji-hoon	**Seohyun** - **Moon Lovers: Scarlet Heart Ryeo** as **Woo-hee**; Lee Ha-nui - Come Back Mister as Song Yi-yeon; Oh Yeon-ah - The Legend of the Blue Sea as young Kang Seo-hee; Ra Mi-ran - Come Back Mister as Maya
Special Award, Actor in a Genre Drama	Special Award, Actress in a Genre Drama
**Park Sung-woong** - **Remember** as **Park Dong-ho**; Im Won-hee - Dr. Romantic as Jang Gi-tae; Jang Hyun-sung - The Doctors as Kim Tae-ho, Mrs. Cop 2 as Park Woo-jin; Lee Si-eon - Remember as Ahn Soo-beom	**Jun Hyo-seong** - **Wanted** as **Park Bo-yeon**; Jung Hye-sung - Remember as Nam Yeo-kyung; Lee Sung-kyung - The Doctors as Jin Seo-woo; Moon Ji-in - The Doctors as Cheon Soon-hee
Special Award, Actor in a Romantic-Comedy Drama	Special Award, Actress in a Romantic-Comedy Drama
**On Joo-wan** - **Beautiful Gong Shim** as **Seok Joon-soo**; Ahn Nae-sang - Entertainer as President Byun; Jung Sang-hoon - Don't Dare to Dream as Choi Dong-gi; Sung Ji-ru - Second to Last Love as Dok Go-bong	**Seo Ji-hye** - **Don't Dare to Dream** as **Hong Hye-won**; Bae Hae-seon - Don't Dare to Dream as Geum Seok-ho; Jung Soo-young - Second to Last Love as Go Sang-hee; Seo Hyo-rim - Beautiful Gong Shim as Gong Mi
Special Award, Actor in a Serial Drama	Special Award, Actress in a Serial Drama
**Song Jae-rim** - **Our Gap-soon** as **Heo Gap-dol**; Go Se-won - Here Comes Love as Na Min-soo; Jang Seung-jo - Marrying My Daughter Twice as Choi Jae-young; Seo Ha-joon - Marrying My Daughter Twice as Kim Hyun-tae/Kim Min-soo	**Kim So-eun** - **Our Gap-soon** as **Shin Gap-soon**; Huh E-jae - You Are a Gift as Gong Hyun-soo; Shin So-yul - Yeah, That's The Way It Is as Yoo So-hee; Yang Jin-sung - Marrying My Daughter Twice as Park Soo-kyung
Hallyu Star Award	Lifetime Achievement Award
**Lee Joon-gi** - **Moon Lovers: Scarlet Heart Ryeo**	**Jang Yong**
Best Couple Award	Idol Academy Award
**Lee Joon-gi** and **Lee Ji-eun** - **Moon Lovers: Scarlet Heart Ryeo**; **Lee Min-ho** and **Jun Ji-hyun** - **The Legend of the Blue Sea**; **Yoo Yeon-seok** and **Seo Hyun-jin** - **Dr. Romantic**; Jang Keun-suk and Yeo Jin-goo - The Royal Gambler; Jo Jung-suk and Gong Hyo-jin - Don't Dare to Dream; Kim Rae-won and Park Shin-hye - The Doctors; Lee Mi-sook and Park Ji-young - Don't Dare to Dream; Namkoong Min and Bang Min-ah - Beautiful Gong Shim; Song Jae-rim and Kim So-eun - Our Gap-soon	Best Kiss
**Lee Joon-gi** and **Lee Ji-eun** - **Moon Lovers: Scarlet Heart Ryeo**; **Lee Min-ho** and **Jun Ji-hyun** - **The Legend of the Blue Sea**; **Yoo Yeon-seok** and **Seo Hyun-jin** - **Dr. Romantic**; Jang Keun-suk and Yeo Jin-goo - The Royal Gambler; Jo Jung-suk and Gong Hyo-jin - Don't Dare to Dream; Kim Rae-won and Park Shin-hye - The Doctors; Lee Mi-sook and Park Ji-young - Don't Dare to Dream; Namkoong Min and Bang Min-ah - Beautiful Gong Shim; Song Jae-rim and Kim So-eun - Our Gap-soon	**Yoo Yeon-seok** and **Seo Hyun-jin** - **Dr. Romantic**; Kim Rae-won and Park Shin-hye - The Doctors; Jo Jung-suk and Gong Hyo-jin - Don't Dare to Dream; Song Jae-rim and Kim So-eun - Our Gap-soon
**Lee Joon-gi** and **Lee Ji-eun** - **Moon Lovers: Scarlet Heart Ryeo**; **Lee Min-ho** and **Jun Ji-hyun** - **The Legend of the Blue Sea**; **Yoo Yeon-seok** and **Seo Hyun-jin** - **Dr. Romantic**; Jang Keun-suk and Yeo Jin-goo - The Royal Gambler; Jo Jung-suk and Gong Hyo-jin - Don't Dare to Dream; Kim Rae-won and Park Shin-hye - The Doctors; Lee Mi-sook and Park Ji-young - Don't Dare to Dream; Namkoong Min and Bang Min-ah - Beautiful Gong Shim; Song Jae-rim and Kim So-eun - Our Gap-soon	Best Eating
**Lee Joon-gi** and **Lee Ji-eun** - **Moon Lovers: Scarlet Heart Ryeo**; **Lee Min-ho** and **Jun Ji-hyun** - **The Legend of the Blue Sea**; **Yoo Yeon-seok** and **Seo Hyun-jin** - **Dr. Romantic**; Jang Keun-suk and Yeo Jin-goo - The Royal Gambler; Jo Jung-suk and Gong Hyo-jin - Don't Dare to Dream; Kim Rae-won and Park Shin-hye - The Doctors; Lee Mi-sook and Park Ji-young - Don't Dare to Dream; Namkoong Min and Bang Min-ah - Beautiful Gong Shim; Song Jae-rim and Kim So-eun - Our Gap-soon	**Jun Ji-hyun** - **The Legend of the Blue Sea**; Jun Kwang-ryul - The Royal Gambler, Remember; Namkoong Min - Beautiful Gong Shim; Oh Yeon-seo - Come Back Mister
**Lee Joon-gi** and **Lee Ji-eun** - **Moon Lovers: Scarlet Heart Ryeo**; **Lee Min-ho** and **Jun Ji-hyun** - **The Legend of the Blue Sea**; **Yoo Yeon-seok** and **Seo Hyun-jin** - **Dr. Romantic**; Jang Keun-suk and Yeo Jin-goo - The Royal Gambler; Jo Jung-suk and Gong Hyo-jin - Don't Dare to Dream; Kim Rae-won and Park Shin-hye - The Doctors; Lee Mi-sook and Park Ji-young - Don't Dare to Dream; Namkoong Min and Bang Min-ah - Beautiful Gong Shim; Song Jae-rim and Kim So-eun - Our Gap-soon	Best "Drudge"
**Lee Joon-gi** and **Lee Ji-eun** - **Moon Lovers: Scarlet Heart Ryeo**; **Lee Min-ho** and **Jun Ji-hyun** - **The Legend of the Blue Sea**; **Yoo Yeon-seok** and **Seo Hyun-jin** - **Dr. Romantic**; Jang Keun-suk and Yeo Jin-goo - The Royal Gambler; Jo Jung-suk and Gong Hyo-jin - Don't Dare to Dream; Kim Rae-won and Park Shin-hye - The Doctors; Lee Mi-sook and Park Ji-young - Don't Dare to Dream; Namkoong Min and Bang Min-ah - Beautiful Gong Shim; Song Jae-rim and Kim So-eun - Our Gap-soon	**Lee Ji-eun** - **Moon Lovers: Scarlet Heart Ryeo**; Jang Keun-suk - The Royal Gambler; Lee Si-eon - Remember; Yoo Seung-ho - Remember
Top 10 Stars Award	New Star Award
**Han Suk-kyu** - **Dr. Romantic**; **Jang Keun-suk** - **The Royal Gambler**; **Jo Jung-suk** - **Don't Dare to Dream**; **Jun Ji-hyun** - **The Legend of the Blue Sea**; **Kim Sung-ryung** - **Mrs. Cop 2**; **Lee Joon-gi** - **Moon Lovers: Scarlet Heart Ryeo**; **Lee Min-ho** - **The Legend of the Blue Sea**; **Namkoong Min** - **Beautiful Gong Shim**, **Remember**; **Park Shin-hye** - **The Doctors**; **Seo Hyun-jin** - **Dr. Romantic**	**Bang Min-ah** - **Beautiful Gong Shim**; **Byun Baek-hyun** - **Moon Lovers: Scarlet Heart Ryeo**; **Go Kyung-pyo** - **Don't Dare to Dream**; **Jung Hae-in** - **Yeah, That's The Way It Is**; **Kwak Si-yang** - **Second to Last Love**; **Kim Min-jae** - **Dr. Romantic**; **Kim Min-seok** - **The Doctors**; **Lee Hye-ri** - **Entertainer**; **Moon Ji-in** - **The Doctors**; **Yang Jin-sung** - **Marrying My Daughter Twice**

== Presenters ==
Order	Presenter	Award	Ref.
1	Park Soo-hong, Park Seon-young	New Star Award	
2	Park Hyung-sik, Park Han-byul	Special Award, Actor/Actress in a Serial/Romantic-Comedy Drama	
3	Namkoong Min, Yoo In-young	Special Award, Actor/Actress in a Genre/Fantasy Drama	
4	Park Sang-hyun	Best Couple Award	
5	Kim Sung-ryung	Lifetime Achievement Award	
6	Kim Hae-sook	Top 10 Stars Award	
7	Lee Han-wi, Jeon Mi-seon	Excellence Award, Actor/Actress in a Serial/Romantic-Comedy Drama	
8	Jo Jung-suk, Shin Se-kyung	Excellence Award, Actor/Actress in a Genre/Fantasy Drama	
9	Go Kyung-pyo, Oh Yeon-seo	Top Excellence Award, Actor/Actress in a Serial Drama	
10	Jang Hyun-sung, Go Ah-sung	Top Excellence Award, Actor/Actress in a Romantic-Comedy Drama	
11	Im Won-hee, Choi Myung-gil	Top Excellence Award, Actor/Actress in a Genre & Fantasy Drama	
12	Jang Keun-suk, Moon Geun-young	Hallyu Star Award	
13	Park Jeong-hyun, Joo Won	Grand Prize (Daesang)	

== Special performances ==
Order	Artist	Song	Ref.
1	Han Ah-reum	"Hidden Story" (숨겨진 이야기) (The Legend of the Blue Sea OST)	
1	Baekhyun	"For You" (너를 위해) (Moon Lovers: Scarlet Heart Ryeo OST)	
1	Seohyun	"The Stranger" (Romantic Doctor, Teacher Kim OST)	
1	Han Ah-reum, Baekhyun, Seohyun	"Hey Jude" (Romantic Doctor, Teacher Kim OST)	
2	Minah, Kim Min-jae, Moon Ji-in	"Who's Your Mama?" (어머님이 누구니)	
2	Yang Jin-sung, Kim Min-seok, Hyeri	"Entertainer" (연예인)	
2	Kim Min-jae, Kim Min-seok, Yang Jin-sung, Moon Ji-in, Hyeri	"Me Gustas Tu" (오늘부터 우리는)	
