= Lee Mi-young (actress) =

South Korean actress (born 1961)

- Born: March 16, 1961 (age 65); South Korea
- Occupation: Actress
- Years active: 1979–present
- Spouse(s): Jeon Young-rok (1985–1997; divorced); Keith Johnston (2003–2005; divorced)
- Children: Jeon Boram; Jeon Wooram
- Family: Lee Chang-hoon (older brother)

Korean name
- Hangul: 이미영
- Hanja: 李美英
- RR: I Miyeong
- MR: I Miyŏng

Lee Mi-young (Korean: 이미영; born March 16, 1961) is a South Korean actress. Lee was a sophomore at Han Kang Girls' Commercial High School when she joined the Miss Haitai beauty pageant in 1978. She was hired at MBC's 10th Open Recruitment in 1979, and made her acting debut in 1980. Lee retired in 1985 after marrying singer Jeon Young-rok, but returned to acting in 1991 and continues to be active in television dramas.

Lee and Jeon divorced in 1997. Their two daughters are both singers: Jeon Boram is a member of girl group T-ara, while Jeon Wooram is a member of girl group D-Unit. Lee remarried in 2003 to Keith Johnston, an American music professor at University of Maryland University College's Yongsan campus; the couple divorced in 2005.

== Filmography ==
=== Television series ===
Year	Title	Role
1980	Seasons of Love	Youngest daughter
1980	Frugal Family	
1981	Gyo-dong's Madam	
1981	Dad's Beard	
1981	Angry Eyes	
1982	Mother	
1982	Women of History: "Jang Hui-bin"	
1982	Market People	
1983	500 Years of Joseon: "Tree with Deep Roots"	Sa Bang-ji
1984	MBC Bestseller Theater: "Our Paradise"	
1984	MBC Bestseller Theater: "The Four Seasons of Hoojo"	
1985	500 Years of Joseon: "The Wind Orchid"	Ok Mae-hyang
1991	TV's The Art of War	Deputy Jo
1992	The Chemistry is Right	
1993	How's Your Husband?	Go Sang-mi
1994	Something Happened in Moraenae	
1995	Journey	
1996	Thief	
1996	Colors: "Sadness Painted in White"	
1996	Landscaping with My Wife	
1997	The Angel Within	
1997	It's Today Somehow	
1997	Nobody Can't Stop It	Park Chul's aunt
1999	Who Are You	Go Jang-soon
2001	Well Known Woman	Woman from Daepae
2001	Guardian Angel	Yoo Sun-jung
2001	Way of Living: Couple	Park Eun-ja
2002	Man in Crisis	Kim Man-geun's wife
2003	Yellow Handkerchief	Lee Han-soon
2003	Twenty	Kim Sang-hyuk's mother
2003	Thousand Years of Love	Mrs. Chae
2004	Something Happened in Bali	Kang In-wook's mother
2004	People of the Water Flower Village	Hong Ae-soon
2004	The Woman Who Wants to Marry	Park Si-bong
2004	Drama City: "Jeong Never Gets Old"	
2005	Sad Love Story	Hwang Min-kyung
2005	Fashion 70s	Go Joon-hee's mother
2005	KBS TV Novel: "Hometown Station"	Kim Ip-boon
2005	Marrying a Millionaire	Goo Jung-sun
2005	Winter Child	Joo-hyang, Hong-dan's biological mother
2006	Seoul 1945	Ji Kye-ok
2006	Wolf	Moon Pil-nyeo
2006	Famous Princesses	Yeon Ha-nam's mother
2006	The Vineyard Man	Choi Ok-sook
2006	Cloud Stairs	Oh Yoon-hee's mother
2006	Couple or Trouble	Oh Kye-joo
2007	A Happy Woman	Jang Byung-gyu's mother
2007	Time Between Dog and Wolf	Myung-ae
2007	First Wives' Club	Bok Boon-ja
2007	Lobbyist	Kim Jung-soon
2008	Painter of the Wind	Mok Kye-wol
2008	Don't Cry My Love	Lee Young-sun
2009	KBS TV Novel: "Glory of Youth"	Oh Gwang-ja
2009	Again, My Love	Park Seon-ok
2009	Loving You a Thousand Times	Park Ae-rang
2009	Temptation of an Angel	Joo Ah-ran's younger aunt
2010	Blossom Sisters	Lee Pil-nam
2010	KBS Drama Special: "Last Flashman"	Soon-young
2011	The Thorn Birds	Soon-geum
2011	A Thousand Kisses	Oh Bok-joo
2012	Suspicious Family	Jang In-sook
2013	Your Lady	Ma Pal-soon
2013	Bel Ami	Lee Mal-ja
2014	Emergency Couple	Jo Yang-ja
2014	Glorious Day	Kim Shin-ae
2014	Mother's Garden	Kim Ja-kyung's mother (cameo, episode 58)
2014	Mr. Back	Go Jung-sook
2015	Enchanting Neighbor	Na Jung-boon
2016–2017	Our Gap-soon	Shin Mal-nyeon
2021	Miss Monte-Cristo	Yoon Cho-sim
2022	Crazy Love	

=== Film ===
Year	Title	Role
1980	Choi In-ho's Hooray for Byung-tae	Oh Young-ja
1983	The Spring of Oh Dal-ja, a College Freshman	
1983	College Wild Dogs	
1984	The Bride Started to Blow the Trumpet	
1984	College Screwballs	Ttosooni/Kim Da-yi
1987	Exciting Lives of Three Girls	(cameo)
2003	Madeleine	Hee-jin's mother
2007	Herb	Mi-ja

== Awards and nominations ==
Year	Award	Category	Nominated work	Result
2000	SBS Drama Awards	Best Supporting Actress	Who Are You	Won
