= Jo Jung-chi =

South Korean singer-songwriter and actor

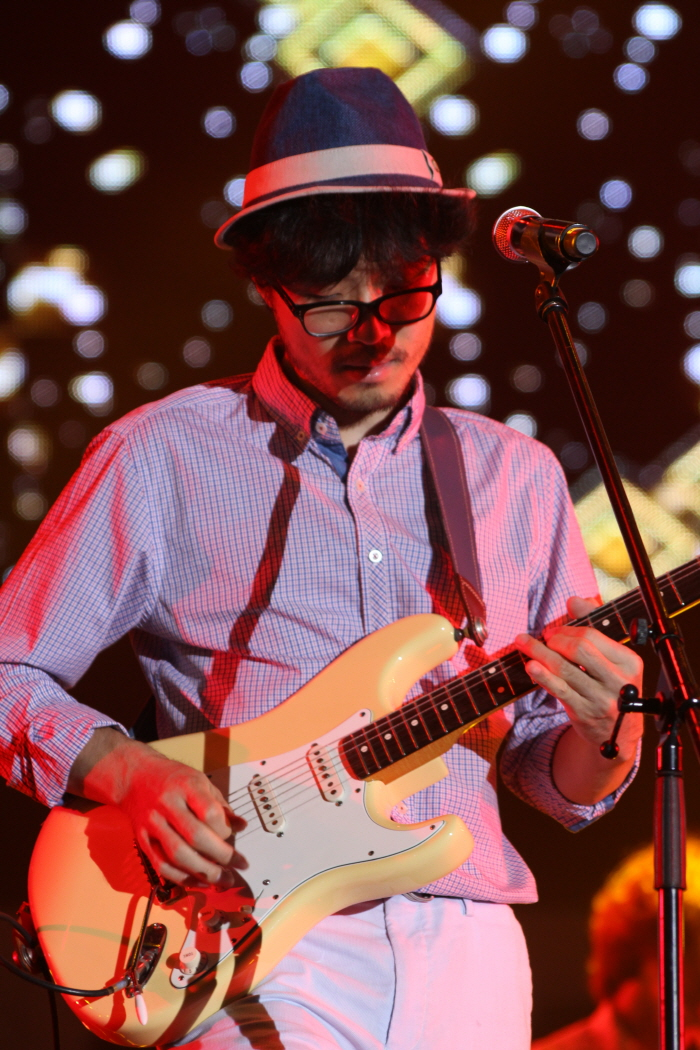
- Cho in 2012
- Born: August 25, 1978 (age 48); South Korea
- Other name: Jungchi Cho
- Occupations: Singer-songwriter; actor
- Years active: 2010–present
- Spouse: Choi Jung-in (m. 2013)
- Children: 2
- Musical career
- Genre: Indie pop
- Instrument: Guitar
- Label: Mystic89
- Website: Official website

Korean name
- Hangul: 조정치
- RR: Jo Jeongchi
- MR: Cho Chŏngch'i

Jo Jung-chi (Korean: 조정치; born August 25, 1978) is a South Korean singer-songwriter and actor. He is best known for starring in the reality TV show We Got Married 4 alongside his now real-life wife, singer Choi Jung-in, in 2013.

== Personal life ==
After dating for eleven years, Jo married Choi Jung-in in 2013. They welcomed their first child, a daughter, in February 2017. Their second child, a son, was born in December 2019.

== Discography ==
=== Studio albums ===
| Title | Album details | Peak chart positions |
| Title | Album details | KOR |
|---|---|---|
| Our Beautiful Love Story (미성년 연애사) | Released: July 13, 2010; Label: Beatball Music Group; Formats: CD, digital download | — |
| Posthumous Work (유작) | Released: January 30, 2013; Label: Mystic89; Formats: CD, digital download | 31 |
| 3 | Released: January 26, 2018; Label: Mystic89; Formats: CD, digital download | 54 |
"—" denotes release did not chart.

=== Singles ===
| Title | Year | Peak chart positions | Sales (DL) | Album |
| Title | Year | KOR | Sales (DL) | Album |
Collaborations
| "Christmas Wishes" with Mystic Entertainment artists | 2013 | 47 | KOR: 111,761+ | Mystic Holiday 2013 |
| "Now" (지금) with Yoon Jong-shin, Hareem, Eddy Kim | 2017 | — | —N/a | Listen 014 single album |
"—" denotes song did not chart.

== Filmography ==
=== Television shows ===
| Title | Year | Role | Ref. |
|---|---|---|---|
| We Got Married 4 | 2013 | himself (cast member) | |
| Same Bed, Different Dreams | 2015 | himself (reoccurring panelist) | |
| It's Dangerous Beyond the Blankets | 2017 | himself (cast member) | |
| The Righteous Life | 2021 | Cast Member | |
| Artistak Game | 2022 | User agent | |

=== Television series ===
| Title | Year | Role | Ref. |
|---|---|---|---|
| Prominent Woman | 2014 | Cheon Gwan | |
| Ex-Girlfriends' Club | 2015 | Choi Ji-hoon | |
| The Producers | 2015 | cameo appearance | |
| The Brothers' Summer | 2015 | Hyeon-cheol | |
| The Bride of Habaek | 2017 | Hwa Gong | |
| Shut Up and Smash | 2017 | Mask man | |
| To. Jenny | 2018 | cameo appearance | |
| Romance Is a Bonus Book | 2019 | Guitarist (cameo appearance) | |
| Imitation | 2021 | Ha-seok | |
| Work Later, Drink Now | 2021 | Ahn So-hee's ex-boyfriend | |
| Shall We Have a Cup of Coffee? | 2021 | Jo Jung-chi (Cameo, episode 11) | |
| Gaus Electronics | 2022 | Na Mu-myeong | |

=== Film ===
| Title | Year | Role | Notes | Ref. |
|---|---|---|---|---|
| Three Summer Nights | 2015 | Musician | Special appearance | |
| Can You Only See Me | 2021 | Jun-seo | Special appearance | |
