= Kim So-eun =

South Korean actress (born 1989)

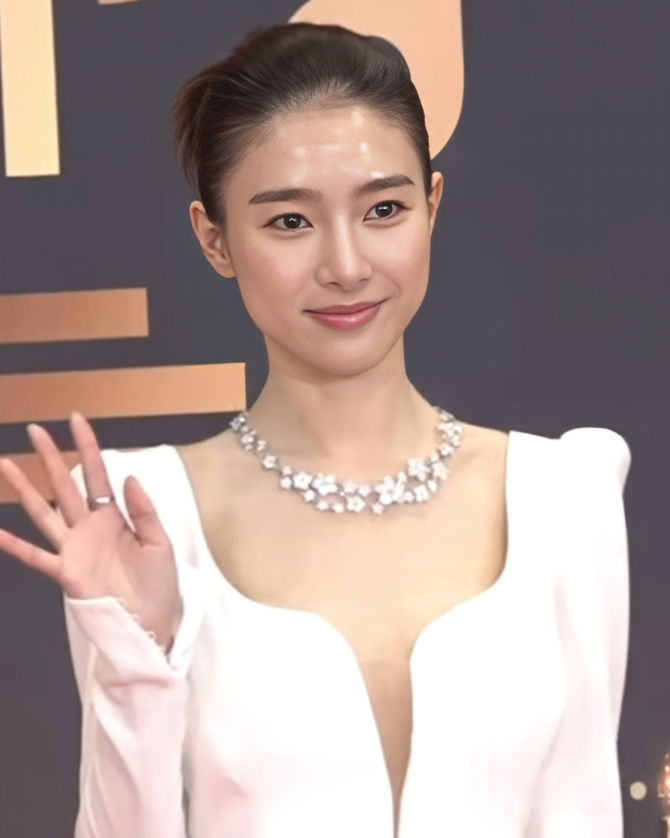
- Kim in January 2023
- Born: September 6, 1989 (age 37); Namyangju, South Korea
- Education: Chung-Ang University – Theater
- Occupation: Actress
- Years active: 2004–present
- Agent: Ascendio Reserve

Korean name
- Hangul: 김소은
- Hanja: 金昭誾
- RR: Gim Soeun
- MR: Kim Soŭn

Kim So-eun (Korean: 김소은; born September 6, 1989) is a South Korean actress. She rose to fame in 2009 in the popular television drama Boys Over Flowers. She has since starred in Happiness in the Wind (2010), A Thousand Kisses (2011–12), Liar Game (2014), Scholar Who Walks the Night (2015), Our Gap-soon (2016–17), Evergreen (2018), and Three Bold Siblings (2022–23). She has won various accolades such as Best New Actress, Special Acting Award and was nominated in different years for Excellence Award and Best Actress in A Special.

== Career ==
=== 2004–2009: First films and rising popularity ===
Kim So-eun made her acting debut with a bit part in the 2004 film Two Guys, when she was in junior high school. She then appeared in minor roles on TV and film, including Sisters of the Sea and The Show Must Go On (where she played Song Kang-ho's daughter).

Kim rose to fame in 2009 with her supporting role as the heroine's best friend in the hit drama Boys Over Flowers. The same year, Kim gained praise for her versatility since for her portrayal of Chae Shi-ra's childhood counterpart Hwangbo Soo in the period epic Empress Cheonchu, for which she learned how to ride a horse and shoot with a bow and arrow. Kim then portrayed an older mid 20s woman in the romantic comedy series He Who Can't Marry, a remake of Japanese drama Kekkon Dekinai Otoko.

=== 2010–2012: Transition to leading roles ===
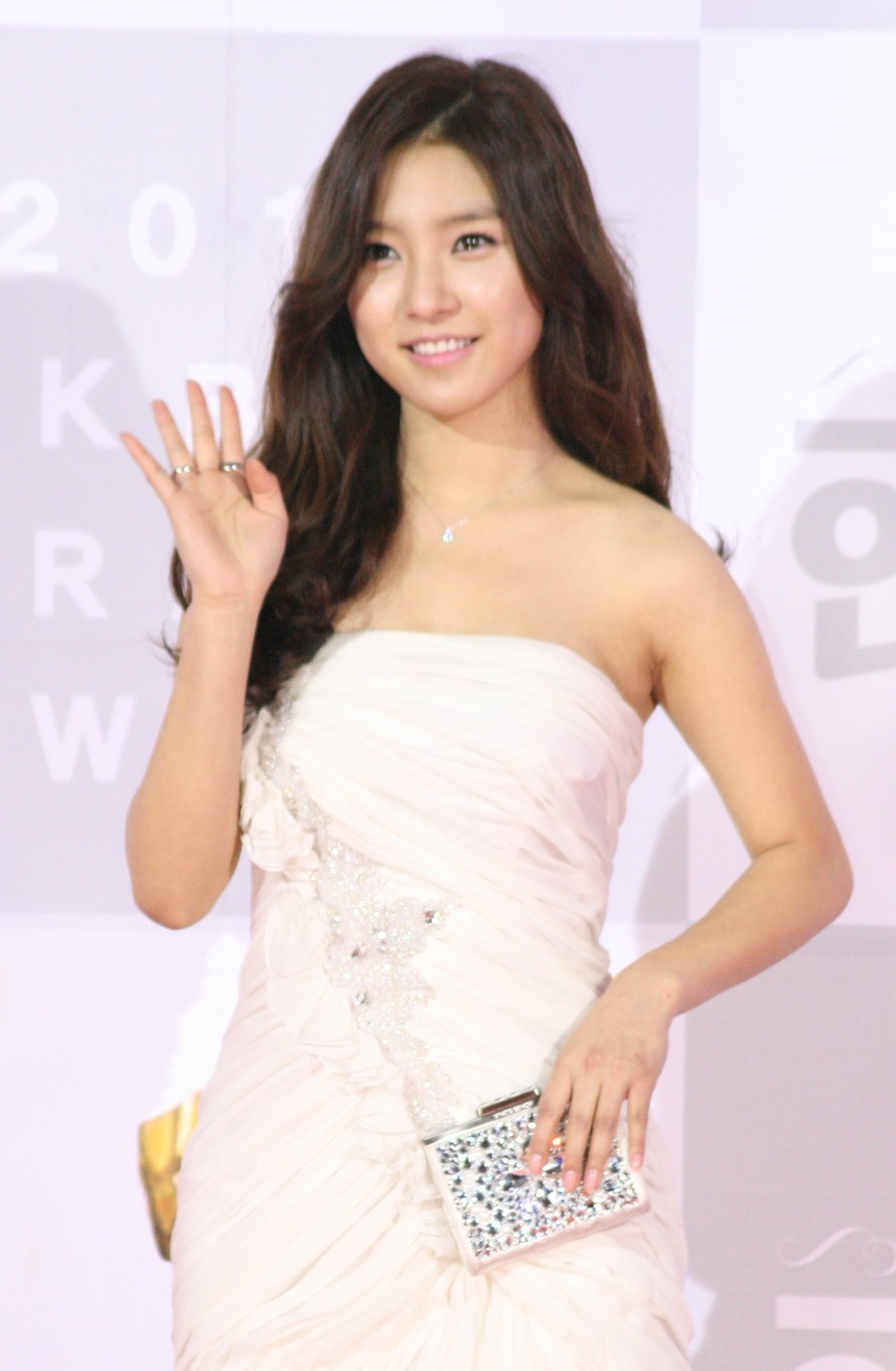
Kim at the 2010 KBS Drama Awards

Kim landed her first leading role in the 2010 daily drama Happiness in the Wind (also known as A Good Day For The Wind To Blow), which further raised her Korean Wave profile.

She then starred in weekend drama A Thousand Kisses (2011–2012), which explored age differences in relationships.

In 2012, she starred in the ten-episode Chinese drama Secret Angel (Chinese: 秘密天使), which aired on the portal website Sohu.com. She returned to Korean television in the cable drama Happy Ending. That same year, she also appeared in Music and Lyrics, a reality show in which an actress and a male musician are paired together to collaborate, as lyricist and composer respectively, in creating a song. Kim and Lee Junho (from boyband 2PM) composed the song "Love is Sad," which Lee also recorded; it was released as a single and featured on the soundtrack of Feast of the Gods.

After playing Princess Sukhwi in the period epic Horse Doctor (also known as The King's Doctor, 2012–2013), Kim starred in After School: Lucky or Not (in the Korean title, bokbulbok refers to a game of chance, literally meaning "Luck, No Luck"), opposite the 5 members of actor-idol group 5urprise, which was distributed via SK Telecom's online and mobile portals.

She and Victoria Song (member of girl group f(x)) were also chosen to host Glitter, a variety show on the lives of trendy twenty-somethings.

=== 2014–present: Return to screen television ===
In 2014, Kim starred in the horror film Mourning Grave, playing a ghost girl who forms a friendship with a ghost-seeing high school boy Kang Ha-neul. This was followed by a leading role in Liar Game, a Korean drama adaptation of the titular Japanese manga by Shinobu Kaitani. Kim also joined the fourth season of reality show We Got Married, where she was paired with Song Jae-rim in a "virtual" marriage; it boosted their popularity as a couple and as individual celebrities.

In 2015, Kim starred in the webtoon adaptation Scholar Who Walks the Night, playing dual roles as a nobleman's daughter and a vampire's past love. She was set to launch her activities in China through the romance film Sky Lantern (also known as Lover of Days Past), a Korean-Chinese co-production film in which she stars opposite Taiwanese singer-actor Aaron Yan. The same year, she starred in the web drama Falling for Challenge alongside Xiumin.

In 2016, Kim signed with new management agency Will Entertainment.

From 2016 to 2017, she starred in the family drama Our Gap-soon as the title character.

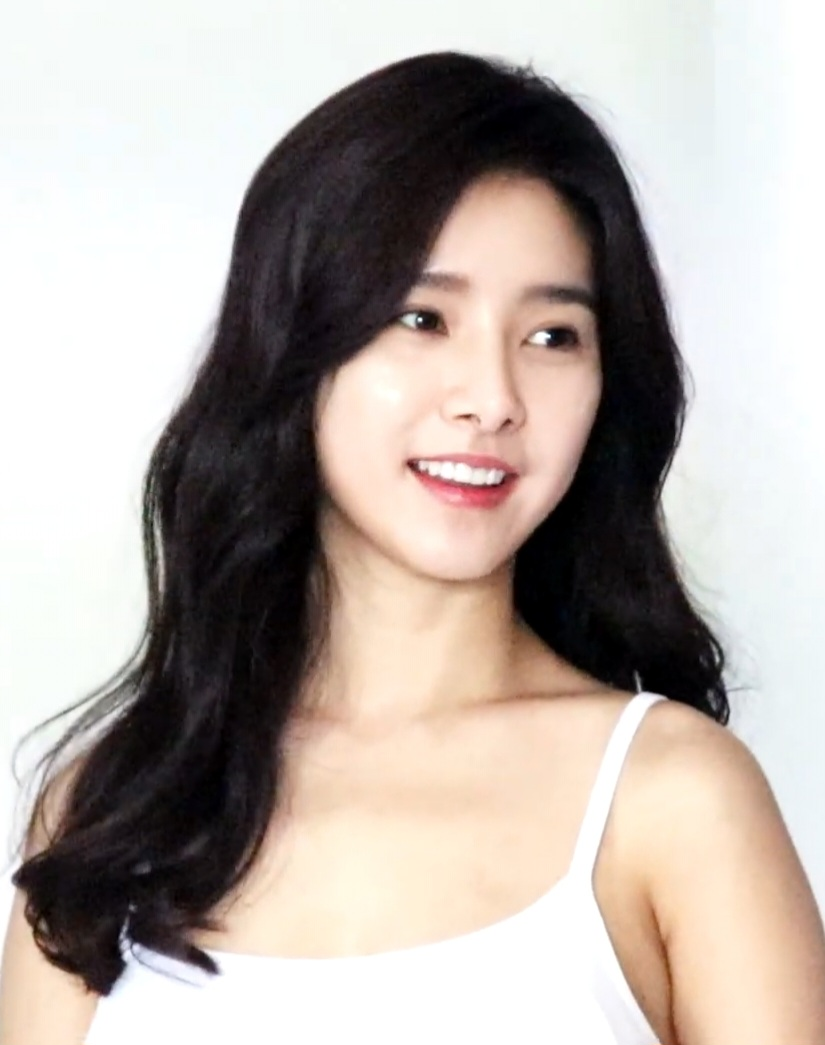
Kim during an ad shoot in 2019

In 2017, Kim starred in the KBS Drama Special You're Closer than I Think together with actor Lee Sang-yeob. The same year, Kim confirmed her return to the silver screen with romance fantasy film Are you in love? opposite Sung Hoon.

In 2018, Kim starred in the romance comedy series That Man Oh Soo with CNBLUE's Lee Jong-hyun.

In August 2021, Kim signed with new agency Ascendio Reserve.

== Other activities ==
=== Skiing ===
As a child, Kim trained professionally as a national athletic skier. Her training was put on indefinite hold after being scouted as a professional model in a 2003 junior advanced skiing and snowboarding competition in Pyeongchang, Gangwon Province. She retained her interest in the sport, appearing in 2012 instructional videos for Hongcheon's Vivaldi ski resort.

=== Endorsements ===
Kim has endorsed various products, and has appeared in magazines such as Allure Korea, High Cut, Vogue Korea, InStyle Korea, Elle Girl Korea, Harper's Bazaar, CeCi, L'Officiel, Esquire Korea, and Nylon Korea.

=== Ambassadorship ===
A regular advocate of art films, youth activism, and eco-living, she served as the goodwill ambassador for the 2009 Korea International Youth Film Festival, the 2009 University Fashion Week, the 2011 Jeonju International Film Festival, the Golden Cinema Festival in 2013 and 2014, and the 2014 Green Film Festival.

== Filmography ==
=== Film ===
Year	English title	Korean title	Role	Notes	Ref.
2004	Two Guys	투가이즈	—N/a	bit part	
2006	Family Matters	모두들, 괜찮아요?	Su-jeong		
2006	Fly, Daddy, Fly	플라이대디	Jang Da-mi		
2007	The Show Must Go On	우아한 세계	Hee-soo		
2007	Someone Behind You	두 사람이다	Kim Ga-yeon		
2014	Mourning Grave	소녀괴담	Se-hee		
2014	Entangled	현기증	Kkot-nip		
2015	Sky Lantern	풍등	Mei Lin		
2020	Are We In Love?	사랑하고 있습니까	So-jung		
2022	The Distributors	유포자들	Im Seon-ae	waave film	

=== Television series ===
Year	English title	Korean title	Role	Notes	Ref.
2005	Sisters of the Sea	자매바다	young Song Jung-hee		
2005	Sad Love Story	슬픈연가	young Park Hye-in		
2006	First Love	드라마 시티	Jung-hee	Drama City	
2007	Chosun Police 1	별순검	Soo-hee	Cameo appearance (episode 9)	
2009	Empress Cheonchu	천추태후	young Hwangbo Soo		
2009	Boys Over Flowers	꽃보다 남자	Chu Ga-eul		
2009	He Who Can't Marry	결혼 못하는 남자	Jeong Yoo-jin		
2010	Happiness in the Wind	바람 불어 좋은날	Kwon Oh-bok		
2011	A Thousand Kisses	천번의 입맞춤	Woo Joo-mi		
2012	Happy Ending	해피엔딩	Kim Eun-ha		
2012	The King's Doctor	마의	Princess Sukhwi		
2014	Liar Game	라이어 게임	Nam Da-jung		
2015	The Scholar Who Walks the Night	밤을 걷는 선비	Choi Hye-ryung / Lee Myung-hee		
2016–2017	Our Gap-soon	우리 갑순이	Shin Gap-soon		
2017	You're Closer Than I Think	당신은 생각보다 가까이에 있다	Hong Tae-ra	Drama Special	
2018	Evergreen	그남자 오수	Seo Yoo-ri		
2020	Lonely Enough to Love	연애는 귀찮지만 외로운 건 싫어!	Lee Na-Eun		
2021	Monthly Magazine Home	월간 집	Cutie Pie	Cameo appearance (episode 8–9)	
2022	The Distributors	드라마 스페셜 :유포자들	Im Seon-ae	Drama Special	
2022–2023	Three Bold Siblings	삼남매가 용감하게	Kim So-rim		

=== Web series ===
Year	English title	Korean title	Role
2012	Secret Angel	시크릿 엔젤	Angel L
2013	After School: Lucky or Not	방과 후 복불복	Kim So-eun
2015	Falling for Challenge	도전에 반하다	Ban Ha-na
2016	Thumping Spike 2	두근두근 스파이크 2	Han Da-woon

=== Television shows ===
Year	English title	Korean title	Role	Notes/Ref.
2012	Music and Lyrics	그 여자 작사 그 남자 작곡		with Lee Junho
2013	Glitter	글리터 글리터	MC	with Victoria Song
2014–2015	We Got Married Season 4	우리 결혼했어요 시즌4	Cast Member	with Song Jae-rim
2017	Battle Trip	배틀트립	Contestant	Episode 59–60; with Jo Bo-ah
2019	Wednesday Food Talk	수요미식회	Panelist	(Episode 204 - Present)
2021–2023	Style Me	스타일미	Host	Season1–2,4–5

=== Music video appearances ===
Year	Song title	Korean title	Artist	Co-star
2005	"Let's Separate"	헤어지자고	Yoon Gun	
2005	"Bye Bye Bye"		Monday Kiz	Monday Kiz
2009	"Bodyguard"	보디가드	Shinee	Kim Bum, Boom
2009	"Goodbye My Love"	잘가요 내사랑	8Eight	Jeong Jinwoon, Jung Gyu-woon
2012	"First Love's Melody"	첫사랑의 멜로디	Acoustic Collabo	Lee Hyun-woo
2013	"Spring Expectation"	봄에게 바라는 것	The Position	

== Awards and nominations ==
Year	Award	Category	Nominated work	Result
2009	Mnet 20's Choice Awards	Hot New Star	Boys Over Flowers	Nominated
2009	Arirang TV 1000th Episode Poll	Best Couple Award (with Kim Bum)	Boys Over Flowers	Won
2009	KBS Drama Awards	Best New Actress	Boys Over Flowers, He Who Can't Marry, Empress Cheonchu	Won
2010	KBS Drama Awards	Excellence Award, Actress in a Daily Drama	Happiness in the Wind	Nominated
2011	MBC Drama Awards	Best New Actress	A Thousand Kisses	Nominated
2012	MBC Drama Awards	Best New Actress	The King's Doctor	Won
2014	Korean Wave Awards	Popular Culture Award	—N/a	Won
2014	MBC Entertainment Awards	New Star of the Year	We Got Married	Won
2014	MBC Entertainment Awards	Best Female Newcomer	We Got Married	Nominated
2014	MBC Entertainment Awards	Best Couple Award (with Song Jae-rim)	We Got Married	Won
2016	SBS Drama Awards	Special Acting Award, Actress in a Serial Drama	Our Gap-soon	Won
2016	SBS Drama Awards	Best Couple Award with Song Jae-rim	Our Gap-soon	Nominated
2022	KBS Drama Awards	Best Actress in Drama Special/TV Cinema	The Distributors	Nominated
2022	KBS Drama Awards	Excellence Award, Actress in a Serial Drama	Three Bold Siblings	Nominated
2022	KBS Drama Awards	Best Couple Award with Kim Seung-soo	Three Bold Siblings	Won
