= A Thousand Kisses (TV series) =

2011 South Korean TV series

- Promotional poster for A Thousand Kisses
- Hangul: 천 번의 입맞춤
- RR: Cheon beonui immatchum
- MR: Ch'ŏn pŏnŭi immatch'um
- Genre: Romance; Melodrama
- Written by: Park Jung-ran
- Directed by: Yoon Jae-moon
- Starring: Seo Young-hee; Ji Hyun-woo; Ryu Jin; Kim So-eun
- Country of origin: South Korea
- Original language: Korean
- No. of episodes: 50

Production
- Executive producer: Lee Chang-sup
- Producer: Oh Sung-min
- Running time: 60 minutes
- Production company: GnG Production

Original release
- Network: Munhwa Broadcasting Corporation
- Release: August 20, 2011 – February 5, 2012

A Thousand Kisses (Korean: 천 번의 입맞춤) is a 2011 South Korean television series, starring Seo Young-hee, Ji Hyun-woo, Ryu Jin and Kim So-eun. It explores the question of age differences in romance. It aired on MBC from August 20, 2011 to February 5, 2012 on Saturdays and Sundays at 20:40 for 50 episodes.

== Plot ==
Woo Joo-young (Seo Young-hee) is the eldest daughter in the family and have come through hardships in life thanks to her bright and caring personality. Her husband Tae-kyung has an affair which ends in their divorce. One day, Joo-young takes her son Chan-noh to a soccer game and meets Jang Woo-bin (Ji Hyun-woo), a former national soccer player who's now a sports agent. Chan-noh warms to Woo-bin and this leads to a close friendship between Joo-young and Woo-bin. Woo-bin romances the divorced single mom, but their differences in age, social status and life experience create obstacles to their relationship.

Jang Byung-doo (Lee Soon-jae) is the chaebol head of a resort group who falls in love with his caregiver Yoo Ji-sun (Cha Hwa-yeon), and they marry.)

Meanwhile, the chaebol's son Jang Woo-jin (Ryu Jin) is the cold and haughty planning manager at his father's resort, who has a strained relationship with his father marked by lingering resentment — he feels Dad showed little kindness to his mother, who died of a hereditary illness. Woo Joo-mi (Kim So-eun) is a freelance reporter for a magazine who doesn't remember her own mother's face, having been raised by her older sister Joo-young and grandmother. She falls for Woo-jin at first sight despite their 9-year age difference, and thanks to her proactive personality, tackles her crush head-on. Rather than suffering from lovesickness on her own, she goes after him assertively, and wins him over by melting his icy exterior with her optimistic, affectionate nature.

== Cast ==
=== Main characters ===
- Seo Young-hee as Woo Joo-young
- Ji Hyun-woo as Jang Woo-bin
- Ryu Jin as Jang Woo-jin (Woo-bin's cousin)
- Kim So-eun as Woo Joo-mi (Joo-young's younger sister)

=== Supporting characters ===
- Cha Soo-yeon as Han Yoo-kyung (Woo-bin's first love)
- Shim Hyung-tak as Park Tae-kyung
- Lee Soon-jae as Jang Byung-doo
- Cha Hwa-yeon as Yoo Ji-sun
- Goo Seung-hyun as Park Chan-noh
- Kim Chang-sook as Min Ae-ja
- Jung Ga-eun as Jang Hye-bin
- Jung Jae-soon as Yum Jung-soon
- Nam Ji-hyun (Note: Credited as Son Ji-hyun.) as Jang Soo-ah
- Ban Hyo-jung as Cha Kyung-soon
- Lee Mi-young as Oh Bok-joo
- Lee Ja-young as Yang Joon-hee
- Kim Chang-wan as Jang Byung-shik
- Yoon Doo-joon as Yoon Ki-joon (cameo)
- Lee Tae-ri (Note: Credited as Lee Min-ho.) as Moon Gi-joon (cameo)
- Yoo Yeon-seok as Hyung-soo, soccer player

== International broadcast ==
- It aired in Vietnam on Let's Viet VTC9 on October 2, 2015 under the title Tình yêu không tuổi.
- In Singapore and Malaysia, it aired on Oh!K from November 26, 2020 to early February 2021.
