= Evergreen (TV series) =

2018 South Korean fantasy television series

- Promotional poster
- Hangul: 그남자 오수
- Lit.: That Man Oh Soo
- RR: Geu namja Osu
- MR: Kŭ namja Osu
- Genre: Fantasy; Romantic comedy
- Created by: OCN; DramaFever
- Written by: Jung Yoo-sun
- Directed by: Nam Gi-hoon
- Starring: Lee Jong-hyun; Kim So-eun
- Country of origin: South Korea
- Original language: Korean
- No. of episodes: 16

Production
- Executive producer: Lee Young-suk
- Running time: 60 minutes
- Production company: IMTV

Original release
- Network: OCN
- Release: March 5 – April 24, 2018

Evergreen (Korean: 그남자 오수) is a fantasy South Korean television series starring Lee Jong-hyun and Kim So-eun. It aired on OCN from March 5 to April 24, 2018, every Monday and Tuesday at 21:00 (KST) for 16 episodes.

== Synopsis ==
The story of two people who fall in love with each other due to a "cupid" that possesses magical pollen.

== Cast ==
=== Main ===
- Lee Jong-hyun as Oh Soo (27 years old), a promising IT engineer with a PhD in artificial intelligence. He is also a café owner and barista.
- Kim So-eun as Seo Yoo-ri (27 years old), a local police officer who is her family's breadwinner.

=== Supporting ===
- Kang Tae-oh as Kim Jin-woo (27 years old), Soo-jeong's high school physical education teacher and Yoo-ri's childhood friend.
- Heo Jung-min as Oh Ga-na (30 years old), Oh Soo's older brother.
- Park Geun-hyung as Oh Man-soo (80 years old), Oh Soo's grandfather.
- Lee Hye-ran as Yoon Chae-ri, a veterinarian.
- Yoo Il as Park Min-ho, Yoo-ri's ex-boyfriend.
- Park Na-ye as Seo Soo-jeong, Yoo-ri's younger sister.
- Kim Ho-jung
- Jin Ye-ju as Han Hyo-jin, a woman who falls in love with Oh Soo, and thus tries to win him over.
- Choi Dae-chul as CEO Nam Ji-seok

=== Special appearances ===
- Kim Ho-jung as Virgin Bodhisattva
- Won Ki-joon as Oh Soo's father
- Ko In-beom
- Han Bo-reum as TBA (30 years old), Oh Ga-na's girlfriend.

== Production ==
Filming for the fully pre-produced series was scheduled to start in December 2017.

== Original soundtrack ==
=== Part 1 ===
Released on March 5, 2018
No.	Title	Lyrics	Music	Artist	Length
1.	"Easy for You (featuring Lee Seung-yeon)"	Ajussen, Sung Hwan	Ajussen, Sung Hwan	Lee Ra-on	03:05
2.	"Easy for You" (Inst.)		Ajussen, Sung Hwan		03:05
Total length:					06:10

=== Part 2 ===
Released on March 13, 2018
No.	Title	Lyrics	Music	Artist	Length
1.	"Being Alone Again" (또 혼자라는 게)	Ajussen	Ajussen	Chaewon, Jinsol (April)	03:57
2.	"Being Alone Again" (Inst.)		Ajussen		03:57
Total length:					07:54

=== Part 3 ===
Released on March 19, 2018
No.	Title	Lyrics	Music	Artist	Length
1.	"Love, Love"	Lee Hwan-wook, Kim Hyun-jeong, Kang Woo-jin, Denis Seo, Kim So-eun	Lee Hwan-wook, Kim Hyun-jeong, Kang Woo-jin, Denis Seo	Kim So-eun	03:21
2.	"Love, Love" (Inst.)		Lee Hwan-wook, Kim Hyun-jeong, Kang Woo-jin, Denis Seo		03:21
Total length:					06:42

=== Part 4 ===
Released on March 26, 2018
No.	Title	Lyrics	Music	Artist	Length
1.	"Strange and Heartbroken" (이상해 맘상해)	Ajussen, Jung Jin-woo	Ajussen	Jung Jin-woo	03:01
2.	"Strange and Heartbroken" (Inst.)		Ajussen		03:01
Total length:					06:02

=== Part 5 ===
Released on April 2, 2018
No.	Title	Lyrics	Music	Artist	Length
1.	"Lost (Prod. by MAKTUB)"	MAKTUB, Lee Ra-on	MAKTUB, Lee Ra-on	Jungyup	03:25
2.	"Lost (Prod. by MAKTUB)" (Inst.)		MAKTUB, Lee Ra-on		03:25
Total length:					06:50

=== Part 6 ===
Released on April 9, 2018
No.	Title	Lyrics	Music	Artist	Length
1.	"Celebrate"	Hi-Graphy (Iconic Sounds), Do Han-se	Maxx Song, Andrew Choi, Shikata Dai, MUSOH, Jake K (Full8loom)	Victon	03:55
2.	"Celebrate" (Inst.)		Maxx Song, Andrew Choi, Shikata Dai, MUSOH, Jake K (Full8loom)		03:55
Total length:					07:50

=== Part 7 ===
Released on April 16, 2018
No.	Title	Lyrics	Music	Artist	Length
1.	"CHU♥ (feat. Purple Rain)"	Whee	Whee	Hwajeong	03:16
2.	"CHU♥" (Inst.)		Whee		03:16
Total length:					06:32

== Ratings ==
Average TV viewership ratings (nationwide)
Ep.	Original broadcast date	Average audience share	
Ep.	Original broadcast date	Nielsen Korea	TNmS
1	March 5, 2018	0.4%	0.4%
2	March 6, 2018	0.3%	0.5%
3	March 12, 2018	0.3%	0.4%
4	March 13, 2018	0.3%	0.4%
5	March 19, 2018	0.2%	0.4%
6	March 20, 2018	0.3%	0.2%
7	March 26, 2018	0.1%	0.2%
8	March 27, 2018	0.1%	0.2%
9	April 2, 2018	0.1%	0.1%
10	April 3, 2018	0.2%	0.2%
11	April 9, 2018	0.1%	0.3%
12	April 10, 2018	0.1%	0.2%
13	April 16, 2018	0.3%	0.2%
14	April 17, 2018	0.2%	0.2%
15	April 23, 2018	0.2%	0.2%
16	April 24, 2018	0.4%	0.4%
Average		0.2%	0.3%
In the table above, the blue numbers represent the lowest ratings and the red numbers represent the highest ratings.; This series aired on a cable channel/pay TV which normally has a relatively smaller audience compared to free-to-air TV/public broadcasters (KBS, SBS, MBC and EBS).
