= Song Jae-rim =

South Korean actor and model (1985–2024)

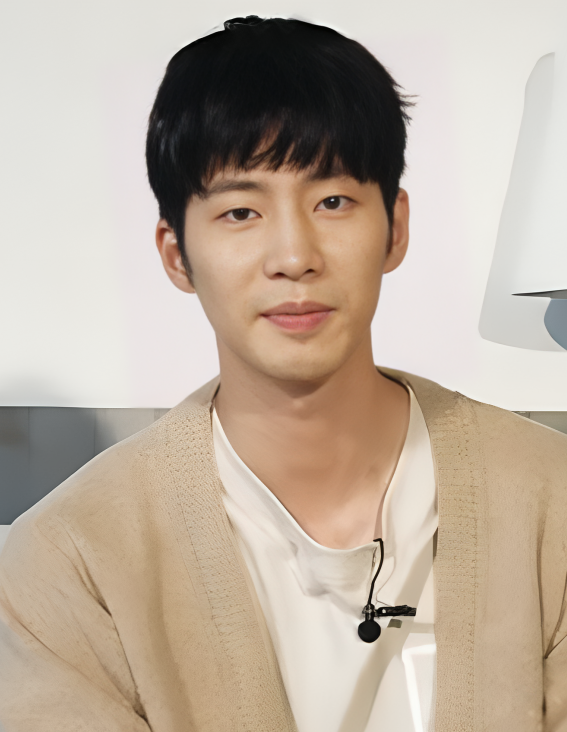
- Song in 2020
- Born: February 18, 1985; Seoul, South Korea
- Died: November 12, 2024 (aged 39); Seoul, South Korea
- Other name: Song Jae-lim
- Education: Chung-Ang University
- Occupations: Actor; model
- Years active: 2009–2024

Korean name
- Hangul: 송재림
- Hanja: 宋再臨
- RR: Song Jaerim
- MR: Song Chaerim

Song Jae-rim (Korean: 송재림; February 18, 1985 – November 12, 2024), also known as Song Jae-lim, was a South Korean actor and model. Starting in modelling, Song had a career as an actor in Korean dramas.

== Early life ==
Song was born on February 18, 1985; his mother, a devout Christian, named him after Jesus's Second Coming ("Jae-rim" in Korean). Song himself was a believer and had a tattoo of two hands in prayer and the verse Philippians 4:13 on his right shoulder as an expression of faith. He had a younger sister, Su-rim (born in 1986). His family was poor, so much so that it was not affected by the 1997 Asian financial crisis, and Song began working part-time at a young age, modeling to pay for college tuition.

In 2003, he enrolled in the Information Systems Department at Chung-Ang University. He did not perform active military service due to a pneumothorax, replacing it with a job at a defense company.

== Career ==
Song began his career as a runway model for the Seoul collections of Juun. J, Herin Homme, and Ha Sang Beg. He also appeared in the magazines Bazaar Korea, Vogue Girl Korea, Dazed Korea, Nylon Korea, GQ Korea, Arena Homme + Korea, Esquire Korea, and Marie Claire Korea.

He developed an interest in acting while performing alternative military service and, seeing it as a way to change his introverted personality, took a leave of absence from college to enroll in an acting academy. He also taught himself directing, lighting and screenwriting techniques. He began acting in 2009 with the film Actresses. In early 2011, he worked for three months as a supermodel in Japan using the name Jay Song and appeared in Men's Non-no, Men's Joker and Street Jack magazines, after which he returned to South Korea to further pursue his acting career. His notable roles include a loyal bodyguard in the period drama Moon Embracing the Sun (2012), and a cold-blooded assassin in Two Weeks (2013). He shot to fame after appearing in the fourth season of We Got Married with Kim So-eun. Wanting a change of environment, in early 2024 he turned to theater for the first time, appearing in the Korean adaptation of Samuel Adamson's Wife. His final role was in the Korean musical adaption of La Rose De Versailles, based on the manga series by Riyoko Ikeda.

== Death ==
On November 12, 2024, Song was found dead at his home in Seongdong District, Seoul at around 12:30 (KST). An official from the Seongdong Police Station said that there was no evidence of foul play. Various news agencies reported that the police found a suicide note at the scene. Song's funeral was held at the Yeouido St. Mary's Funeral Hall on November 14. The family wished for a small service and offered no cause of death.

== Filmography ==
=== Film ===
Year	Title	Role	Notes	Ref.
2009	Actresses	Photographer's assistant		
2010	Grand Prix	Lee In-jae		
2012	Give Me Back My Cat		Short film	
2013	The Suspect	Professor Kim		
2014	Tunnel 3D	Ki-cheol		
2018	On Your Wedding Day	Lee Yoon-geun	Special appearance	
2019	The Snob	Seo Jin-ho		
2022	Yaksha: Ruthless Operations	Jae Gyu	Netflix film	
2022	Good Morning	Barista Yoon		
2025	Crypto Man	Yang Do-hyun	Posthumous release	
TBA	Get Rich	Oh Gi-roh	Posthumous release	
TBA	Salmon	Hae-nam	Posthumous release	

=== Television series ===
Year	Title	Role	Notes	Ref.
2010	Big Thing	Official in the club		
2010	Secret Garden	Singer		
2011	Cool Guys, Hot Ramen	Hee-gon		
2012	Moon Embracing the Sun	Kim Jae-woon		
2013	Nail Shop Paris	Kay		
2013	Fantasy Tower	Yong-wan		
2013	Two Weeks	Mr. Kim		
2014	Inspiring Generation	Mo Il-hwa		
2014	Big Man	Park Dong-pal	Cameo	
2014	Secret Love	Time slip helper	Ep. 1–2 "Missing You"	
2014	The Idle Mermaid	Kwon Shi-kyung		
2015	Unkind Ladies	Lee Roo-oh		
2016	Goodbye Mr. Black	Seo Woo-jin		
2016	Thumping Spike	Hwang Jae-woong		
2016–2017	Our Gap-soon	Heo Gap-dol		
2017	Borg Mom	NIS Agent		
2018	Secret Mother	Ha Jung-wan		
2018–2019	Clean with Passion for Now	Choi Ha-in / Dr. Daniel Choi		
2019	I Wanna Hear Your Song	Nam Joo-wan		
2019	Drama Stage: "Big Data Romance"	Kim Seo-joon	Season 3	
2021	How to Be Thirty	Cha Do-hoon		
2021	Work Later, Drink Now	Song PD	Cameo	
2022	Café Minamdang	Han Jae-jung	Cameo	
2023	All That We Loved	Dr. Go (Adult Go Yoo)	Cameo	
2024	My Military Valentine	Sung Jae-hoon		
2024	Queen Woo	Go Pae-eui		

=== Television shows ===
Year	Title	Role	Notes	Ref.
2014–2015	We Got Married Season 4	Cast member	Partnered with Kim So-eun	
2015	House Cook Master Baek	Cast member		
2019	Surfing House	Cast member		

=== Music video appearances ===
Year	Song title	Artist	Ref.
2009	"Molla-ing"	May Doni	
2009	"Bus"	Yeo Hoon-min	
2009	"Because of You"	After School	
2010	"Go Away"	2NE1	
2012	"The Day Before"	Nell	
2013	"Runaway"	Kara	
2013	"Message"	BoA	
2014	"Agape"	Zhang Liyin	
2014	"Not Alone"	Zhang Liyin	
2015	"Me, Myself"	Shin Seung-hun	

== Theatre ==
Year	Production	Role	Venue	Ref.
2024	Wife	Robert	LG Arts Center	
2024	La Rose de Versailles	Florian Victor Clement de Gerodelle	Chungmu Arts Hall	

== Awards and nominations ==
Name of the award ceremony, year presented, category, nominee of the award, and the result of the nomination
Award ceremony	Year	Category	Nominee / work	Result	Ref.
KBS Drama Awards	2015	Best New Actor	Unkind Ladies	Nominated	
KBS Drama Awards	2015	Popularity Award, Actor	Unkind Ladies	Nominated	
KBS Drama Awards	2015	Best Couple Award	Song Jae-rim (with Lee Ha-na); Unkind Ladies	Nominated	
MBC Entertainment Awards	2014	Best Male Newcomer	We Got Married	Won	
MBC Entertainment Awards	2014	Best Couple Award	Song Jae-rim (with Kim So-eun); We Got Married	Won	
SBS Drama Awards	2016	Special Acting Award, Actor in a Serial Drama	Our Gap-soon	Won	
SBS Drama Awards	2016	Best Couple Award	Song Jae-rim (with Kim So-eun); Our Gap-soon	Nominated	
SBS Drama Awards	2018	Top Excellence Award, Actor in a Daily/Weekend Drama	Secret Mother	Nominated	
