= Yang Jin-sung =

South Korean actress (born 1988)

- Born: June 27, 1988 (age 38); Seoul, South Korea
- Education: Ewha Womans University – Fine Arts (dropped out)
- Occupation: Actress
- Years active: 2010–present
- Agent: WS Entertainment

Korean name
- Hangul: 양진성
- Hanja: 楊眞聖
- RR: Yang Jinseong
- MR: Yang Chinsŏng

Yang Jin-sung (Korean: 양진성; born June 27, 1988) is a South Korean actress. After making her acting debut in the 2010 film Wedding Dress, Yang played supporting roles in various television dramas, such as the male protagonist's dead ex-girlfriend in Secret Love (2013). She starred in her first leading turn (in dual roles) in the 2014 fantasy/romance series Bride of the Century. She won the New Star Award at the 2016 SBS Drama Awards for Marrying My Daughter Twice.

== Filmography ==
=== Television series ===
Year	Title	Role	Ref.
2011	City Hunter	Shin Eun-ah	
2011	Just Like Today	Moon Hyo-jin	
2013	She Is Wow	Yoo Nan-hee	
2013	Secret Love	Seo Ji-hee	
2013	Drama Festival: "Me, Dad, Mom, Grandma and Anna"	Anna	
2014	Bride of the Century	Na Doo-rim/Jang Yi-kyung	
2015	My Unfortunate Boyfriend	Yoo Ji-na	
2016	Marrying My Daughter Twice	Park Soo-kyung	
2017	Chicago Typewriter	Ma Bang-jin	
2018	Cross	Son Yeon-hee	
2018	Let Me Introduce Her	Son Chae-young	

=== Film ===
Year	Title	Role
2010	Wedding Dress	Adult So-ra
2013	Hope	Do-kyung
