= Bride of the Century =

- Promotional poster for Bride of the Century
- Also known as: Hundred Year Bride
- Genre: Comedy; Romance; Fantasy; Melodrama
- Written by: Baek Young-sook
- Directed by: Yoon Sang-ho
- Starring: Lee Hong-gi; Yang Jin-sung; Sung Hyuk
- Country of origin: South Korea
- Original language: Korean
- No. of episodes: 16

Production
- Executive producer: Choi Byung-hwa
- Producers: Jung Hyung-seo; Jung Hoe-seok
- Production location: Korea
- Production company: Aura Media

Original release
- Network: TV Chosun
- Release: February 22 – April 12, 2014

Bride of the Century (Korean: 백년의 신부; RR: Baengnyeonui sinbu), also known as Hundred Year Bride, is a 2014 South Korean television series starring Lee Hong-gi and Yang Jin-sung. It aired on cable channel TV Chosun from February 22 to April 12, 2014, for 16 episodes. The fantasy/romance drama revolves around a family curse that causes the first wife of the first born son to die.

== Plot ==
Taeyang Group is the largest conglomerate in South Korea. The Choi family who runs Taeyang has supposedly been under a curse for a hundred years that the first bride of the eldest son will always die. When the wealthy heiress Jang Yi-kyung (Yang Jin-sung) disappears right before her wedding to chaebol heir Choi Kang-joo (Lee Hong-gi), Na Doo-rim (Yang Jin-sung), a looka impostor, is brought in to take her place. Unlike the cold and calculating Yi-kyung, Doo-rim is sweet and sunny, and Kang-joo genuinely falls in love with her. As the wedding plans progress, Kang-joo and Yi-kyung's mothers both scheme and plot behind the scenes.

== Cast ==
- Lee Hong-gi as Choi Kang-joo
  - Lomon as teen Choi Kang-joo
  - Jeon Jin-seo as young Choi Kang-joo

A good-looking and educated second-generation chaebol heir. He has a prickly personality, and is self-indulgent and bad at relationships. But he is goodhearted underneath it all, and is harboring pain from his childhood.

- Yang Jin-sung as Na Doo-rim / Jang Yi-kyung

Na Doo-rim is a sweet, homely girl who comes from a southern island village. Jang Yi-kyung is a chic, cold and calculating woman who wants to marry into the Choi family. Doo-rim and Yi-kyung are doppelgängers.

- Sung Hyuk as Jang Yi-hyun

Yi-kyung's older half-brother. He is the operations manager of Ohsung Construction.

- Lee Hee-Won (aka Jang Ah Young )as Lee Roo-mi

An upper-class young woman with looks and brains who went to a prestigious university. Roo-mi becomes Doo-rim's rival for Kang-joo's heart.

- Nam Jeong-hee as Park Soon-bok

Doo-rim's grandmother.

- Park Jin-joo as Oh Jin-joo

Doo-rim's childhood friend.

- Choi Il-hwa as Choi Il-do

Kang-joo's father, and CEO of Taeyang Group.

- Kim Seo-ra as Kim Myeong-hee

Kang-joo's mother. The unloved wife of a wealthy man who tries to destroy her son's relationship with a girl from a poor family.

- Jung Hae-in as Choi Kang-in

Kang-joo's younger brother, and an idol singer.

- Kang Tae-hwan as Secretary Kim
- Shin Eun-jung as Ma Jae-ran

Yi-kyung's mother, and CEO of Ohsung Construction.

- Kim Ah-young as Sung Joo-shin (ghost)
- Kim Yoo-jung as Leeann
- Im Byung-ki as Butler Jang

Butler of the Choi family.

- Kwon Eun-ah as Ahn Dong-daek

Butler Jang's wife.

== Production ==
Filming began in Namhae on December 9, 2013.

After having dinner with the drama crew on December 16, 2013, an accident occurred on an icy street which led to Lee Hong-gi suffering a dislocated shoulder and facial scratches. He was prescribed six weeks of rest and returned to the set on 10 January 2014.

== Reception ==
It received a good response in Korea for a cable drama, with a peak viewership rating of 1.451%.

According to one of China's biggest internet portal sites QQ, Bride of the Century ranked number one on weekly and monthly charts in both March and April 2014, exceeding 100 million views. It was also ranked as the most searched phrase on China's microblogging service Weibo.

International broadcasting rights have been sold to Japan, U.S., China, Vietnam, Cambodia and other countries. A Chinese remake is expected to air at the end of 2014.

== Ratings ==
In this table, the blue numbers represent the lowest ratings and the red numbers represent the highest ratings.

Ep.	Original broadcast date	AGB Nielsen
Ep.	Original broadcast date	Nationwide
1	February 22, 2014	0.474%
2	February 23, 2014	0.399%
3	March 1, 2014	0.764%
4	March 2, 2014	0.844%
5	March 8, 2014	0.762%
6	March 9, 2014	0.973%
7	March 14, 2014	0.611%
8	March 15, 2014	1.062%
9	March 21, 2014	1.311%
10	March 22, 2014	1.451%
11	March 28, 2014	1.123%
12	March 29, 2014	1.349%
13	April 4, 2014	0.952%
14	April 5, 2014	1.044%
15	April 11, 2014	0.942%
16	April 12, 2014	1.052%
Average		0.945%

- This drama aired on a cable channel/pay TV which normally has a relatively smaller audience compared to free-to-air TV/public broadcasters (KBS, SBS, MBC and EBS).

== Original soundtrack ==
Bride of the Century: Original Soundtrack

Soundtrack album by Various Artists
- Released: April 11, 2014
- Genres: Pop, K-pop, soundtrack
- Labels: CJ E&M, FNC Entertainment

No.	Title	Artist	Length
1.	"들어와" (Come Inside)	Lee Jae-jin	3:36
2.	"아직 하지 못한 말" (Words I Couldn't Say Yet)	Choa	4:33
3.	"아직 하지 못한 말" (Words I Couldn't Say Yet)	Lee Hong-gi	4:31
4.	"My Girl"	2Young	3:35
5.	"아나요" (Do You Know)	Jeon Geun-hwa	4:01
6.	"들어와 (Inst.)" (Come Inside (Inst.))	Lee Jae-jin	3:36
7.	"아직 하지 못한 말 (Inst.)" (Words I Couldn't Say Yet (Inst.))	Lee Hong-gi	4:31
8.	"백년의 신부" (Bride of the Century)	Various Artists	1:46
9.	"비밀의 열쇠" (Key of Secret)	Various Artists	2:12
10.	"Rise In the World"	Various Artists	2:46
11.	"Walk Around"	Various Artists	1:38
12.	"백년의 저주" (Hundred Years Curse)	Various Artists	3:07
13.	"두근 두근 나두림" (Pit-a-pat Na Doo-rim)	Various Artists	2:12
14.	"Grey Shadow"	Various Artists	1:11
15.	"Hundred Steps"	Various Artists	2:06
16.	"Mournful Eyes"	Various Artists	2:15
17.	"Savior of Hell"	Various Artists	2:26

== International Broadcast ==
- India - 20/08/2021–Present On MX Player in Hindi Dubbed Episodes.
