= Our Gap-soon =

South Korean television series

- Also known as: Perfect Bride
- Hangul: 우리 갑순이
- RR: Uri Gapsuni
- MR: Uri Kapsuni
- Genre: Romantic; Comedy
- Written by: Moon Young-nam
- Directed by: Boo Sung-cheol
- Starring: Kim So-eun; Song Jae-rim
- Country of origin: South Korea
- Original language: Korean
- No. of episodes: 61 (Note: Following a change of timeslot beginning with Episode 21, two episodes are shown each night with a commercial break in between the two. Extended by 11 episodes from the original 50 following a ratings increase.)

Production
- Executive producer: Lee Yong-seok
- Producers: Kim Sang-heon; Oh Min-soo; Son Gi-won
- Running time: 70 minutes
- Production companies: Chorokbaem Media; Kim Jong-hak Production
- Budget: 12 billion won

Original release
- Network: SBS
- Release: August 27, 2016 – April 8, 2017

Our Gap-soon (Korean: 우리 갑순이) is a 2016–2017 South Korean television series starring Kim So-eun and Song Jae-rim. This is the first time that a virtual couple from MBC's We Got Married co-stars as main cast in a serial drama on a national Korean television network. It aired on SBS every Saturdays to Sundays at 20:45 (KST) from August 27 to October 30, 2016, and then 2 episodes every Saturday from November 5, 2016 to April 8, 2017. This change generated a rating increase that led to an 11-episode extension, making the series end with 61 episodes.

== Cast ==
=== Main ===
- Kim So-eun as Shin Gap-soon (29-year-old)
- Song Jae-rim as Heo Gap-dol (29-year-old)

=== Supporting ===
==== Gap-soon's family ====
- Jang Yong as Shin Joong-nyeon (63-year-old, Gap-soon's father)
- Go Doo-shim as In Nae-shim (63-year-old, Gap-soon's mother)
- Lee Mi-young as Shin Mal-nyeon (Joong-nyeon's younger sister)

==== Gap-dol's family ====
- Lee Bo-hee as Nam Gi-ja (58-year-old, Gap-dol's mother)
- Kim Gyu-ri as Heo Da-hae (36-year-old, Gap-dol's elder sister)

==== Shin Jae-soon's family ====
- Yoo Sun as Shin Jae-soon (39-year-old, Gap-soon's elder sister)
- Choi Dae-chul as Jo Geum-sik (42-year-old, Jae-soon's husband)
- Yang Jeong-won as Jo Ah-young (36-year-old, Geum-sik's younger sister)
- Park Seo-yeon as Jo Cho-rong (Geum-sik and Da-hae's elder daughter)
  - Seo Ga-eun as child Cho-rong (Cameo, episode 7)
- Uhm Seo-hyun as Jo Da-rong (Geum-sik and Da-hae's younger daughter)
- Lee Seung-woo as Jeon Ddol (Jae-soon and Se-bang's son)

==== Shin Se-gye's family ====
- Lee Wan as Shin Se-gye (32-year-old, Gap-soon's elder brother)
- Jang Da-yoon as Yeo Gong-joo (24-year-old, Se-gye's wife)
- Kim Hye-sun as Yeo Shi-nae (49-year-old, Gong-joo's mother)
- Jeon Gook-hwan as Yeo Bong (70-year-old, Shi-nae's father)

==== Geum Do-geum's family ====
- Lee Byung-joon as Geum Do-geum (58-year-old)
  - Ji Chan as young Do-geum
- Seo Kang-seok as Geum Soo-jo (27-year-old)

=== Extended ===
- Yoo Se-rye as Jung Man-joo (Se-gye's colleague and former schoolmate)
- Cha Gwang-soo as Bong Sam-sik (Do-geum's best friend)
- Han Do-woo as Choi Ha-soo
- Jung Chan as Jeon Se-bang (Jae-soon's former husband and Ddol's biological father)
- Lee Ye-young as Shalala
- Yoon Ji-on as Student part timer
- Go Young-min as Bae Dal-tong (Gap-dol's best friend)
- Won Jong-rye as Nae-shim's friend
- Kim Ik-tae as real estate agent
- Kim Kyung-ryong
- Lee Kang-wook
- Son Dong-hwa
- Ah Young as Kim Young-ran (Gap-dol's colleague)
- Kim Jeong-hwan as Go Dal-pa
- Seo Yoo-jeong as Ban Ji-ah
- Lee Sang-sook
- Park Cho-eun
- Lee Seung-joon as snooper
- Kim Jong-ho as convenience store owner

== Ratings ==
In the table below, the blue numbers represent the lowest ratings and the red numbers represent the highest ratings.

Episode #	Original broadcast date	Average audience share			
Episode #	Original broadcast date	TNmS Ratings		AGB Nielsen Ratings	
Episode #	Original broadcast date	Nationwide	Seoul National Capital Area	Nationwide	Seoul National Capital Area
1	August 27, 2016	6.3%	7.3%	6.8%	7.7%
2	August 28, 2016	8.1%	9.4%	8.4%	9.1%
3	September 3, 2016	6.5%	7.6%	6.5%	7.2%
4	September 4, 2016	6.1%	6.9%	6.9%	7.4%
5	September 10, 2016	6.2%	7.5%	6.9%	8.1%
6	September 11, 2016	6.3%	6.5%	6.4%	6.9%
7	September 17, 2016	7.1%	7.6%	7.4%	8.1%
8	September 18, 2016	7.6%	9.1%	8.4%	9.2%
9	September 24, 2016	6.4%	7.7%	8.2%	8.7%
10	September 25, 2016	7.7%	9.0%	8.4%	9.6%
11	October 1, 2016	6.7%	7.8%	7.5%	8.6%
12	October 2, 2016	8.4%	11.1%	8.9%	10.1%
13	October 8, 2016	7.2%	7.6%	7.2%	7.8%
14	October 9, 2016	7.3%	8.3%	8.3%	9.0%
15	October 15, 2016	7.3%	8.8%	7.5%	8.0%
16	October 16, 2016	8.2%	10.4%	8.9%	10.1%
17	October 22, 2016	6.2%	7.3%	7.7%	8.1%
18	October 23, 2016	8.3%	9.4%	9.6%	10.7%
19	October 29, 2016	7.7%	8.5%	7.8%	9.0%
20	October 30, 2016	8.7%	10.2%	11.1%	12.8%
21	November 5, 2016	8.0%	9.2%	8.5%	10.0%
22	November 5, 2016	9.8%	11.5%	10.6%	11.2%
23	November 12, 2016	8.2%	9.2%	9.7%	10.4%
24	November 19, 2016	8.3%	9.6%	9.5%	10.3%
25	November 19, 2016	12.5%	13.9%	13.7%	14.3%
26	November 26, 2016	8.9%	10.9%	10.0%	11.6%
27	November 26, 2016	13.2%	15.3%	15.3%	17.0%
28	December 3, 2016	8.0%	9.7%	9.1%	10.5%
29	December 3, 2016	13.4%	15.8%	14.5%	15.6%
30	December 10, 2016	9.2%	11.3%	10.1%	11.5%
31	December 10, 2016	14.3%	17.6%	16.1%	17.5%
32	December 17, 2016	9.3%	11.9%	10.9%	12.5%
33	December 17, 2016	15.1%	17.2%	16.8%	18.4%
34	December 24, 2016	8.0%	9.4%	9.7%	10.0%
35	December 24, 2016	13.5%	15.2%	16.1%	16.2%
36	January 7, 2017 (Note: No episodes were aired on December 31 due to the broadcast of the 2016 SBS Drama Awards ceremony.)	8.2%	9.9%	9.7%	10.9%
37	January 7, 2017	14.9%	16.5%	16.3%	17.4%
38	January 14, 2017	9.0%	10.7%	10.3%	11.3%
39	January 14, 2017	16.5%	18.1%	16.9%	17.2%
40	January 21, 2017	7.5%	8.4%	8.7%	9.6%
41	January 21, 2017	13.8%	15.6%	15.8%	16.1%
42	February 4, 2017	7.8%	9.1%	8.5%	9.5%
43	February 4, 2017	15.0%	17.0%	17.0%	17.8%
44	February 11, 2017	8.5%	9.9%	10.8%	12.2%
45	February 11, 2017	14.9%	17.2%	17.0%	17.8%
46	February 18, 2017	6.8%	8.4%	8.1%	9.2%
47	February 18, 2017	14.1%	16.5%	17.0%	17.2%
48	February 25, 2017	6.7%	7.6%	8.9%	10.0%
49	February 25, 2017	15.9%	17.8%	18.2%	19.0%
50	March 4, 2017	10.9%	12.7%	12.6%	13.4%
51	March 4, 2017	14.9%	17.3%	18.3%	18.5%
52	March 11, 2017	11.8%	14.7%	14.2%	14.7%
53	March 11, 2017	14.7%	17.8%	18.1%	17.7%
54	March 18, 2017	12.9%	14.7%	14.4%	15.2%
55	March 18, 2017	17.3%	19.2%	19.2%	20.0%
56	March 25, 2017	14.3%	16.4%	14.4%	15.7%
57	March 25, 2017	17.8%	20.0%	19.2%	20.3%
58	April 1, 2017	13.7%	15.5%	13.3%	13.8%
59	April 1, 2017	18.9%	22.3%	18.8%	19.9%
60	April 8, 2017	14.0%	15.8%	14.6%	16.2%
61	April 8, 2017	19.4%	21.8%	20.1%	21.4%
Average		10.56%	12.24%	11.80%	12.71%

== Original soundtrack ==
=== OST Part 1 ===
No.	Title	Artist	Length
1.	"Our Gap-soon (우리 갑순이)"	Daybreak	3:35
2.	"Our Gap-soon (우리 갑순이)" (Inst.)		3:35
Total length:			7:10

=== OST Part 2 ===
No.	Title	Artist	Length
1.	"How Did We (어쩌다 우리가)"	Gemini (제미니)	3:05
2.	"How Did We (어쩌다 우리가)" (Inst.)		3:05
Total length:			6:10

=== OST Part 3 ===
No.	Title	Artist	Length
1.	"Can You See (보이나요)"	Bily Acoustie (빌리어코스티)	3:49
2.	"Can You See (보이나요)" (Inst.)		3:49
Total length:			7:38

=== OST Part 4 ===
No.	Title	Artist	Length
1.	"If You Crossed (스쳐갔다면)"	BBAhn	3:15
2.	"If You Crossed (스쳐갔다면)" (Inst.)		3:15
Total length:			6:30

=== OST Part 5 ===
No.	Title	Artist	Length
1.	"Don't Leave Me (돌아서지 말아요)"	The Nuts	3:29
2.	"Don't Leave Me (돌아서지 말아요)" (Inst.)		3:29
Total length:			6:58

=== OST Part 6 ===
No.	Title	Artist	Length
1.	"Don't Come Closer (다가오지 말아요)"	Kim Hyo-jin (2NB)	3:58
2.	"Don't Come Closer (다가오지 말아요)" (Inst.)		3:58
Total length:			7:56

=== OST Part 7 ===
No.	Title	Artist	Length
1.	"Love Love Love"	Only You (온리유) ft. 노르웨이 숲	4:04
2.	"Love Love Love" (Inst.)		4:04
Total length:			8:08

=== OST Part 8 ===
No.	Title	Artist	Length
1.	"You Are My Dream"	Via (비아)	4:32
2.	"You Are My Dream" (Inst.)		4:32
Total length:			9:04

=== OST Part 9 ===
No.	Title	Artist	Length
1.	"Like A Star"	Gemini (제미니)	3:47
2.	"Like A Star" (Inst.)		3:47
Total length:			7:34

=== OST Part 10 ===
No.	Title	Artist	Length
1.	"If We (만약에 우리)"	Yoon Won (윤원)	4:03
2.	"If We (만약에 우리)" (Inst.)		4:03
Total length:			8:06

=== OST Part 11 ===
No.	Title	Artist	Length
1.	"Just Turn Around (그냥 돌아서면 돼)"	Lydia	4:00
2.	"Just Turn Around (그냥 돌아서면 돼)" (Inst.)		4:00
Total length:			8:00

=== OST Part 12 ===
No.	Title	Artist	Length
1.	"Starting From Today (오늘부터 시작)"	Cheon Seok-man (천석만) & Blue Mangtto (파랑망또)	3:18
2.	"Starting From Today (오늘부터 시작)" (Inst.)		3:18
Total length:			6:36

=== OST Part 13 ===
No.	Title	Artist	Length
1.	"Dripping (뚝뚝뚝)"	Say'n (세인)	3:53
2.	"Dripping (뚝뚝뚝)" (Inst.)		3:53
Total length:			7:46

=== OST Part 14 ===
No.	Title	Artist	Length
1.	"Can I Love You? (사랑해도 될까요)"	Han All (한올)	3:49
2.	"Can I Love You? (사랑해도 될까요)" (Inst.)		3:49
Total length:			7:38

=== OST Part 15 ===
No.	Title	Artist	Length
1.	"Hello"	Berry Good	3:17
2.	"Hello" (Inst.)		3:17
Total length:			6:34

=== OST Part 16 ===
No.	Title	Artist	Length
1.	"That's Right (맞구요)"	Kim Ji-min	3:23
2.	"That's Right (맞구요)" (Inst.)		3:23
Total length:			6:46

=== OST Part 17 ===
No.	Title	Artist	Length
1.	"Just Once (꼭 한 번만)"	Ha Sung (하성)	3:15
2.	"Just Once (꼭 한 번만)" (Inst.)		3:15
Total length:			6:30

=== OST Part 18 ===
No.	Title	Artist	Length
1.	"Yes I Did (그래 그랬어)"	Oh Yoon-hye	4:16
2.	"Yes I Did (그래 그랬어)" (Inst.)		4:15
Total length:			8:31

=== OST Part 19 ===
No.	Title	Artist	Length
1.	"You Mean Everything"	Son Yoo-na (2NB)	3:13
2.	"You Mean Everything" (Inst.)		3:13
Total length:			6:26

=== OST Part 20 ===
No.	Title	Artist	Length
1.	"There Was One Person (한 사람이 있었다)"	Paul Song (폴 송)	3:42
2.	"There Was One Person (한 사람이 있었다)" (Inst.)		3:42
Total length:			7:24

=== OST Part 21 ===
No.	Title	Artist	Length
1.	"If You See (너만 보면)"	Raon (라온)	3:55
2.	"If You See (너만 보면)" (Inst.)		3:55
Total length:			7:50

=== OST Part 22 ===
No.	Title	Artist	Length
1.	"That's Right (맞구요) (Ballad Ver.)"	Kim Ji-min	3:23
2.	"That's Right (맞구요) (Ballad Ver.)" (Inst.)		3:23
Total length:			6:46

== Production ==
Our Gap-soon is helmed by Boo Sung-cheol who was the director of many SBS dramas such as Only You (2005), Lobbyist (2007), Star's Lover (2008), My Girlfriend Is a Gumiho (2010), Jang Ok-jung, Living by Love (2013), The Heirs (2013) and Mask (2015).

First script reading took place on August 2, 2016.

== Awards and nominations ==
Year	Award	Category	Recipient	Result
2016	SBS Drama Awards	Top Excellence Award, Actress in a Serial Drama	Go Doo-shim	Nominated
2016	SBS Drama Awards	Excellence Award, Actor in a Serial Drama	Lee Wan	Nominated
2016	SBS Drama Awards	Excellence Award, Actress in a Serial Drama	Kim Gyu-ri	Nominated
2016	SBS Drama Awards	Special Award, Actor in a Serial Drama	Song Jae-rim	Won
2016	SBS Drama Awards	Special Award, Actress in a Serial Drama	Kim So-eun	Won
2016	SBS Drama Awards	Lifetime Achievement Award	Jang Yong	Won
2016	SBS Drama Awards	Best Couple Award	Song Jae-rim and Kim So-eun	Nominated
2016	SBS Drama Awards	Idol Academy Award – Best Kiss	Song Jae-rim and Kim So-eun	Nominated
