= Yoo Il =

South Korean actor

- Born: Park Sang-il; January 11, 1990 (age 36); Seoul, South Korea
- Occupations: Actor; businessperson
- Years active: 2009–2020
- Spouse: Joo Min-ha (m. 2022)
- Children: 1

Korean name
- Hangul: 박상일
- RR: Bak Sangil
- MR: Pak Sangil

Stage name
- Hangul: 유일
- RR: Yu Il
- MR: Yu Il

Park Sang-il (born January 11, 1990), known professionally as Yoo Il, is a South Korean actor. In 2009, he made his debut as a former cast member of variety show Allzzang Generation. He was a member and the leader of Fantagio's actor group 5urprise from 2013 until their disbanding on 2020.

== Personal life ==
In June 2022, it was reported that Yoo will marry actress Joo Min-ha, who have been together for four years, with a wedding ceremony in July 2022 that will be held in a private ceremony. His wife gave birth to their first child, a son, on December 24, 2022.

== Filmography ==
=== Television series ===
Year	Title	Role	Ref.
2013	Wonderful Mama	Go Young-joon's friend	
2015	You Will Love Me	Han Geon-woong	
2016	Monster	Yoo Tae-in	
2018	Evergreen	Park Min-ho	

=== Web series ===
Year	Title	Role	Ref.
2013	After School: Lucky or Not	Himself	
2014	After School: Lucky or Not 2	Himself	
2015	To Be Continued	Gang member 2	
2016	Great Secret 25	Mr. Park (episode 2)	

=== Variety show ===
Year	Title	Notes	Ref.
2009	Allzzang Generation	Cast member (season 1)	
2014	Dokimeki Kandora	MC	

=== Theater ===
Year	Title	Role	Ref.
2016	"Casa Valentina" (까사 발렌티나)	Jonathan/Miranda	

=== Musical ===
Year	Title	Role	Ref.
2015	"Roh Gi-soo" (로기수)	Roh Gi-soo	
2016	"Secretly Greatly" (은밀하게 위대하게)	Won Ryu-hwan	
