= Marrying My Daughter Twice =

2016 South Korean drama series

- Promotional Poster
- Hangul: 내 사위의 여자
- RR: Nae sawiui yeoja
- MR: Nae sawiŭi yŏja
- Genre: Family drama Comedy; Romance; Melodrama
- Screenplay by: Ahn Seo-jung
- Directed by: Ahn Kil-ho
- Starring: Yang Jin-sung; Seo Ha-joon; Park Soon-chun; Jang Seung-jo
- Country of origin: South Korea
- Original language: Korean
- No. of episodes: 120

Production
- Producer: Min Yeon-hong
- Running time: 40 minutes
- Production company: SBS Plus

Original release
- Network: SBS
- Release: January 4 – June 17, 2016

Marrying My Daughter Twice (Korean: 내 사위의 여자; RR: Nae sawiui yeoja; lit. 'My Son-in-Law's Woman') is a South Korean drama series starring Yang Jin-sung, Seo Ha-joon, Park Soon-chun and Jang Seung-jo. It aired on SBS on Mondays through Fridays at 8:30am for 120 episodes, from January 4 to June 17, 2016.

== Plot ==
Lee Jin-sook (Park Soon-chun) is a speaker on family happiness. However, she has a sad past. Years ago, she was kicked out of the house by her mother-in-law and was forced to be separated from her newborn daughter. She remarried, and when her second husband died 5 years later, she brought up her two young stepdaughters like her own. She was against the marriage when her youngest stepdaughter, Oh Yeong-chae, (Lee Si-won) wanted to marry Kim Hyeon-tae (Seo Ha-joon), a rookie boxer and an orphan, but she relented. When Yeong-chae, who was involved in a hit-and-run accident, died after giving birth to a son, Jin-sook blamed and hated her son-in-law.

After Yeong-chae's death, Hyeon-tae and his son stayed together with Jin-sook and treated her like his mother. When she saw how Hyeon-tae took care of his son, her attitude towards him changed. Now she treats Hyeon-tae like her real son.

One day, Hyeon-tae falls in love with a woman named Park Soo-kyeong (Yang Jin-sung). Jin-sook, who is unhappy with Soo-kyeong, finds out that Soo-kyeong is her biological daughter. Although she is eager to reunite with Soo-kyeong, she is in a dilemma as Soo-kyeong hates her birth mother for abandoning her. Hyeon-tae finally marries Soo-kyeong, but it also causes conflicts.

== Cast ==
=== Main ===
- Seo Ha-joon as Kim Hyeon-tae
- Yang Jin-sung as Park Soo-kyeong
- Park Soon-chun as Lee Jin-sook
- Jang Seung-jo as Choi Jae-yeong

=== Supporting ===
- Kil Yong-woo as Park Tae-ho
- Hwang Young-hee as Ma Seon-yeong
- Lee Jae-eun as Oh Yeong-sim
- Seol Jung-hwan as Park Soo-cheol
- Lee Sang-ah as Jung Mi-ja
- Seo Woo-rim as Mrs. Bang
- Kim Ha-gyoon as Choi Dal-seok
- Han Young as Baek Jin-joo
- Yoon Ji-yoo as Lee Ga-eun
- Park Jae-min as Cha Ik-joon
- Jang Jung-hee as Cheon Ok-soon
- Park Seong-geun as Goo Min-sik
- Jung Kyung-ho as Kang Woo-sik

=== Special appearance ===
- Lee Si-won as Oh Yeong-chae
