= 5urprise =

South Korean boy band

- Also known as: Surprise
- Origin: South Korea
- Genre: K-pop
- Years active: 2013–2020
- Labels: Fantagio; King
- Past members: Yoo Il; Seo Kang-joon; Gong Myung; Kang Tae-oh; Lee Tae-hwan
- Website: fantagio.kr/artists/5urprise/

5urprise (Korean: 서프라이즈; pronounced surprise), was the first ever South Korean actor group and consists of five actors: Yoo Il, Seo Kang-joon, Gong Myung, Kang Tae-oh and Lee Tae-hwan.

== History ==
5urprise was launched by talent agency Fantagio in September 2013. The group members were selected through Fantagio's "Actor′s League," a program for discovering aspiring actors, and were trained for two years before making their entertainment debut.

Unlike idol groups which begin their careers as singers and later expand their endeavors to acting, 5urprise did the opposite. As their first project, they made their acting debut in After School: Lucky or Not, a 12-episode mobile drama with each episode lasting 15 minutes, and viewed through Nate Hoppin, BTV, and T-Store on smartphones and tablet computers. They played five members of a high school club who encounter an outcast (played by actress Kim So-eun) and as they complete "missions," they build a friendship with each other and coax the shy girl out of her shell. 5urprise released the single "Hey U Come On" for the mobile drama's soundtrack. Pre-debut, members of the group also appeared in music videos of female pop group Hello Venus. 5urprise released their first single in 2014, titled From My Heart.

On March 31, 2020, it was announced by Fantagio that all five members have decided to part ways with the company, leaving the group disbanded.

== Filmography ==
- 2013: After School: Lucky or Not
- 2015: Taste of Others (Episode 4, 5, & 7)
- 2018: Netflix's Busted! (Season 1; Episode 4)

== Discography ==
=== Soundtrack ===
- 2013: "Hey U Come On"

=== Single albums ===
Title	Details	Peak chart positions			Sales
Title	Details	KOR	JPN Hot	JPN Oricon	Sales
From My Heart	Released: 18 November 2014 (KOR); Label: Fantagio Music, LOEN Entertainment; Format: CD, Digital download; Language: Korean; Track listing: 1. From My Heart; 2. JUMP; 3. From My Heart (instrumental); 4. JUMP (instrumental)	18	—	—	KOR: 1,205
5urprise Flight	Released: 28 October 2015 (JPN); Label: King Records; Format: CD, Digital download; Track listing: 1. 5urprise Flight; 2. Once More; 3. I Sing for You	—	—	37	
Shake It Up	Released: 10 August 2016 (JPN); Label: King Records; Format: CD, Digital download; Track listing CD 1: 1. Shake It Up; 2. Teenage Love; CD 2: 1. Shake It Up (MV); 2. Teenage Love (MV)	—	83	23	
