= Same Bed, Different Dreams =

South Korean television entertainment program

- Poster
- Genre: Variety, talk show
- Written by: Bong Uri; Lee Yu-jeong; Choe Hyeong-yeong; Lee Bomi; Kim Hyeon-jin; Kim Seon-hui; Choe Jeong-won; Yoo Hyeli; Song Ji-seon
- Presented by: Yoo Jae-suk; Kim Gu-ra; Seo Jang-hoon
- Country of origin: South Korea
- Original language: Korean
- No. of episodes: Season 1 – 62 episodes Season 2 – 8 episodes

Production
- Producers: Yeo Un-hyeog; Seo Hye-jin; Jo Mun-ju; Kim Min; Yu Ji-yun
- Running time: 75–80 minutes
- Production company: SM C&C

Original release
- Network: SBS
- Release: March 31, 2015 – present

Same Bed, Different Dreams (Korean: 동상이몽, 괜찮아 괜찮아) is a South Korean television entertainment program distributed and syndicated by SBS every Monday at 11:10 pm. Before February 15, 2016, the program aired every Saturday at 8:45 pm.

In the program, teens and their parents come and openly share their issues with the show's panel, trying to resolve their problems with each other.

== Main MC ==
- Yoo Jae-suk
- Kim Gu-ra
- Seo Jang-hoon

== Fixed and semi-fixed panelists ==
- Jung Si Ah (from episode 56-62)
- Yang Se-hyung (from episode 50-62)

== Former panelist ==
- Heo Ji-woong (episodes 8-23)
- Choi Eun-kyeong (from episode 23-49) → except episodes 43,44,46,47,48
- Kim Jun-hyun (from episode 28-44) → except episodes 42,43
- Lee Soo-min (from episode 42-50) → except episodes 43,45,47,48

== List of panelists ==
Episodes #	Air Date	Guests
Pilot	March 31, 2015	Ji Suk-jin, Jang Youngran, Jimin (AOA), No Tae-Yeob, Park Eun Kyung, Lee Han Suk (SBS reporter)
1	April 25, 2015	Ji Suk-jin, Jang Youngran, Jimin (AOA), Oh Yoon Ah, Lee Han Suk
2	May 2, 2015	Ji Suk-jin, Jang Youngran, Jimin (AOA), Lee Han Suk, Seo Jang-hoon
3	May 9, 2015	Ji Suk-jin, Jang Youngran, Jimin (AOA), Lee Han Suk, Seo Jang-hoon
4	May 16, 2015	Ji Suk-jin, Seo Jang-hoon, Oh Yoon Ah, Heo Kyung-hwan, Amber (f(x)), Lee Hye Jung (chef)
5	May 23, 2015	Ji Suk-jin, Seo Jang-hoon, Jang Youngran, Lee Han Suk, Choi Eun-kyeong
6	May 30, 2015	Ji Suk-jin, Jang Youngran, Lee Han Suk, Choi Eun-kyeong, Kim Poong, Park Chanyeol (EXO)
7	June 6, 2015	Ji Suk-jin, Jang Youngran, Lee Han Suk, Shoo (S.E.S.), Soyou (Sistar)
8	June 13, 2015	Heo Ji-woong, Choi Eun-kyeong, MC Gree, Jang Youngran, Lee Han Suk
9	June 20, 2015	Ji Suk-jin, Jang Youngran, Choi Eun-kyeong, Heo Kyung-hwan, Yoon Hyung Bin, Kim Eung-soo, Kim Na-young
10	June 27, 2015	Jang Youngran, Choi Eun-kyeong, Kim Young-chul
11	July 4, 2015	Jang Youngran, Jimin (AOA), Han Seong-ho (FNC's CEO)
12	July 11, 2015	Choi Eun-kyeong, Hani (EXID), Hong Jin-young
13	July 18, 2015	Choi Eun-kyeong, Shin Jung-geun, Lizzy (After School)
14	July 25, 2015	Jang Youngran, San E, Kangnam, Han Seong-ho (FNC's CEO)
15	August 1, 2015	Choi Eun-kyeong, Jo Kwon (2AM), Park Sang-myun, Kim Sook
16	August 8, 2015	Choi Eun-kyeong, Kim Sook, Hong Jin-ho, Eun Ji-won
17	August 15, 2015	Choi Eun-kyeong, Lee Ji-hyun, Kang Kyun-sung
18	August 22, 2015	Baro (B1A4), Hwang Kwanghee (ZE:A), Jang Do-yeon, Yoon Son-ha, Lee Hye Jung (chef)
19	August 29, 2015	Yoon Son-ha, Dr. Heo Yang-im, Song Jae-rim, Lee Guk-joo, Jung Areum, Kim Jae-kyung (Rainbow)
20	September 5, 2015	Choi Eun-kyeong, Han Seung-yeon (Kara), Kim Tae-woo, Kim Jong-min
21	September 12, 2015	Jung Yong-hwa (CNBLUE), Park Choa (AOA), Bae Hae Sun
22	September 19, 2015	Yoon Son-ha, Hong Jin-kyung, Shin Bora, Kim Eung-soo
23	September 26, 2015	Jang Do-yeon, Hwang Seok-jeong, Choi Kang-hee, Yoon Min-soo, Park Choa (AOA)
24	October 3, 2015	Dong Hyun Kim, Jo Jung-chi, Sleepy
25	October 10, 2015	Hwang Chi-yeul, Kim Dong-wan, K.Will, Yura (Girl's Day)
26	October 17, 2015	Choi Hyun-seok, Kim Jae-kyung (Rainbow), Jo Jung-chi
27	October 24, 2015	Lee Bong-Won, Lee Gi-kwang, Park Na-rae
28	October 31, 2015	Shim Hyung-tak, Lee Guk-joo, Kim Sae-rom
29	November 7, 2015	Park Na-rae, Hani (EXID), LE (EXID)
30	November 28, 2015	Seulgi (Red Velvet), Lee Byeong-heon, Muzie
31	December 5, 2015	Jo Jung-chi, Lee Hong-gi (F.T. Island), YooA (Oh My Girl)
32	December 12, 2015	Heo Young-ji (Kara), Rap Monster (BTS), Oh Se-deuk
33	December 19, 2015	Kim Dong-jun (ZE:A), Julien Kang, Gain (Brown Eyed Girls), Jo Jung-sik (announcer)
34	December 26, 2015	Zico (Block B), Seulgi (Red Velvet), Kim Kwang-kyu, Park Si-eun, Jang Ye Won (announcer)
35	January 2, 2016	Lee Soo-min, Lee Chun-soo, Kim Ji-min, Jota (Madtown)
36	January 9, 2016	Zico (Block B), Seulgi (Red Velvet), Han Seong-ho (FNC's CEO)
37	January 16, 2016	Yoon Sang-hyun, Kim Shin-young, Kim Min-kyo, YooA (Oh My Girl), HaHa (special guest)
38	January 23, 2016	Nayeon, Dahyun (Twice), Jobin (Norazo), Ryeowook (Super Junior), Jang Yun-jeong
39	January 30, 2016	Jessi, Hong Yoon-Hwa, Shin Hye-sung, Sandeul (B1A4)
40	February 15, 2016	Julien Kang, Lee Guk-joo, Jang Youngran, P.O (Block B), Lee Elijah
41	February 22, 2016	Jang Dong-min, Jung Eun-ji (Apink), Cao Lu (Fiestar)
42	February 29, 2016	Kim Je-dong, Kim Sook, Yerin, Yuju (GFriend)
43	March 7, 2016	Yang Se-hyung, Tzuyu, Jihyo (Twice), Baro (B1A4), Kang Joo Eun
44	March 14, 2016	Lee Bong-Won, Yang Se-hyung, Jang Dong-min, Hong Yoon-Hwa, Tzuyu, Jihyo (Twice)
45	March 21, 2016	Kim Heung-Gook, Park Na-rae, So-jin (Girl's Day), Kyuhyun (Super Junior)
46	March 28, 2016	Park Myeong-su, Kim Mi-kyung, J-Hope (BTS), Jiho (Oh My Girl), Choi Tae-joon, Moon Ji-Yoon
47	April 4, 2016	Heo Kyung-hwan, Eric Nam, Park Min-ji, Jung Si Ah, Solar, Wheein (Mamamoo)
48	April 11, 2016	Yang Se-hyung, Seo Eunkwang, Lee Minhyuk (BtoB), Kim Sung-eun, Choi Yu-jin (CLC), Kim Won-hae
49	April 18, 2016	Heo Kyung-hwan, Park Min-ji, Gong Hyung-jin
50	April 25, 2016	Hyun Joo-yup, Bang Min-ah (Girl's Day), Jo Eun-sook
51	May 2, 2016	Jeong Jun-ha, Cha Yu-ram, Dahyun (Twice), Seo Eunkwang (BtoB), Solbin (Laboum)
52	May 9, 2016	Ryu Seung-soo, Kim Min-Kyung, Joy, Seulgi (Red Velvet), Park Ki-ryang
53	May 16, 2016,	Kim Heung-Gook, Jung Si Ah, Jeongyeon, Sana (Twice), Sunwoo Sun, Jun Hyo-seong (Secret), Jeong Jinwoon (2AM)
54	May 23, 2016	Kim Heung-Gook, Kim Sae-rom, Hyuna (4Minute), Jung Si Ah, Jeongyeon, Sana (Twice), Park Jae-jung
55	May 30, 2016	Kim Heung-Gook, Kim Sae-rom, Jung Si Ah
56	June 6, 2016	Hong Seo-beom, Jo Gap-kyung, Jeon So-min, Solji (EXID)
57	June 13, 2016	Jeon So-min, Kim Hyo-yeon, Jung Da-bin, Jung Chae-yeon (I.O.I), Solji (EXID)
58	June 20, 2016	Kim Do-kyun (Boohwal), Hong Seo-beom, Jo Gap-kyung, Kim Hyo-yeon, Yang Jae-jin, Jung Da-bin, Jung Chae-yeon(I.O.I)
59	June 27, 2016	Kim Hyo-jin, Jo Kwon (2AM), Hyelim (Wonder Girls), Lee Yi-kyung, Cha Tae-hyun, Hong Kyung-min, Jung Chae-yeon (I.O.I)
60	June 13, 2016	Kim Hyo-jin, Jo Kwon (2AM), Hyelim (Wonder Girls), Lee Yi-kyung, Yang Jeong-won, Hong Jin-young, Yang Jae-jin, Sam Hammington, Jiho (Oh My Girl)
61	June 20, 2016	Lee Hong-gi, Choi Jong-hoon (F.T. Island), Yang Jae-jin, Sam Hammington, Tzuyu, Sana, Mina, Chaeyoung (Twice), Eunbin (CLC)
62	June 27, 2016	Yang Se-hyung, Jung Si-ah, Yang Jung-won, Hong Jin-young, Sam Hammington, Jiho (Oh My Girl), Cha Tae-hyun, Hong Kyung-min, Jung Chae-yeon (I.O.I)

== Controversy ==
During episode 14, a girl in high school came out to complain that her father seeks skinship with her despite her age. On the program she explained that her father not only tries to hold her hands but also touch her buttocks, thighs, and even tries to give her pecks. The mood was not serious as the daughter explained it in a bright manner but wanted him to stop. The father also responded that he does so because he feels that she will not be his baby daughter anymore if he suddenly stops it. But during the show, the father is also seen grabbing her from behind as well as climbing onto her bed.

After the show aired, many disturbed viewers in Korea brought up the issue by bad mouthing the father for his inappropriate behavior to his grown daughter. Even an international viewer shared this on the online community Reddit and asked for the issue to be shared. Many have expressed that although they do not believe the father to be a pedophile, he needs to change his ways of treating his daughter. Since then, the daughter featured on the program tried to explain the situation by stating that her father even claimed that there were too many skin-ship scenes as a lot of those parts were made up for the program. She also added that her family is indeed happy and to stop the hatred towards her father. After her message through her SNS account, many viewers have turned their hate towards the producers of the program by trying to make up scenes on the show to attract more viewers.

The producers and staff of Same Bed Different Dreams have officially apologized stating that many of the scenes were indeed put in to make things more interesting. And that they did not have intentions of disturbing viewers or making the family look bad. They also have promised to work more efficiently in order to bring better issues and episodes after this controversy.

== Season 2 ==
This season comes with a format change. Compared to season 1 where the purpose was to break down the barriers between generations and remediate the conflicts between parents and children this season focuses on the life of celebrity couples.

== Ratings ==
=== 2015 ===
List of ratings in 2015 (episode Pilot-34)

Episode #	Original airdate	AGB Ratings
Pilot	March 31	5.1%
1	April 25	4.4%
2	May 2	5.5%
3	May 9	6.3%
4	May 16	6.2%
5	May 23	4.8%
6	May 30	5.7%
7	June 6	6.6%
8	June 13	6.0%
9	June 20	6.4%
10	June 27	5.5%
11	July 4	6.3%
12	July 11	6.1%
13	July 18	5.6%
14	July 25	5.3%
15	August 1	5.5%
16	August 8	5.1%
17	August 15	6.1%
18	August 22	4.7%
19	August 29	5.3%
20	September 5	7.1%
21	September 12	6.3%
22	September 19	6.5%
23	September 26	6.7%
24	October 3	6.2%
25	October 10	7.2%
26	October 17	7.1%
27	October 24	7.2%
28	October 31	8.6%
29	November 7	6.7%
30	November 28	5.0%
31	December 5	4.8%
32	December 12	6.2%
33	December 19	4.5%
34	December 26	4.7%

=== 2016 ===
List of ratings in 2016 (episode 35-62)

Episode #	Original airdate	AGB Ratings
35	January 2	7.8%
36	January 9	5.8%
37	January 16	6.4%
38	January 23	6.5%
39	January 30	6.4%
40	February 15	5.2%
41	February 22	5.1%
42	February 29	6.9%
43	March 7	5.6%
44	March 14	5.2%
45	March 21	6.4%
46	March 28	4.9%
47	April 4	5.6%
48	April 11	5.3%
49	April 18	4.7%
50	April 25	5.1%
51	May 2	4.8%
52	May 9	5.4%
53	May 16	4.4%
54	May 23	4.7%
55	May 30	4.1%
56	June 6	5.0%
57	June 13	4.2%
58	June 20	4.8%
59	June 27	5.6%
60	July 4	5.3%
61	July 11	5.2%
62	July 18	4.4%

== Awards and nominations ==
Year	Award	Category	Recipients	Result
2015	SBS Entertainment Awards	Programme Excellence Award	Same Bed, Different Dreams	Won
2015	SBS Entertainment Awards	Show Variety Newcomer Award (Female)	Kim Wan-sun	Won
2015	SBS Entertainment Awards	Producer Award	Kim Gura	Won
2016	SBS Entertainment Awards	Grand Prize (Daesang)	Kim Gura	Nominated
