= Comedy Big League =

South Korean television comedy show

- Comedy Big League Promotional Poster
- Genre: Comedy
- Created by: Rhee Myung-han
- Country of origin: South Korea
- Original language: Korean
- No. of episodes: 515

Production
- Production location: South Korea
- Running time: 80 minutes

Original release
- Network: tvN
- Release: September 17, 2011 – present

Comedy Big League (Korean: 코미디빅리그) is a South Korean comedy show presented by Shin Young-il and Bae Ji-hyun. It airs on tvN on Sundays at 10:40 (KST).

== Seasons ==
- Season 1 (September 17, 2011 – November 19, 2011)
- Season 2 (December 24, 2011 – March 31, 2012)
- Season 3 (May 12, 2012 – August 18, 2012)
- Season 4 (September 29, 2012 – August 17, 2013)
- Season 5 (September 29, 2013 – 13, 2023)

== Famous comedians ==
- Park Na-rae
- Lee Guk-joo
- Lee Yong-jin
- Lee Jin-ho
- Lee Sang-jun
- Moon Se-yoon
- Yang Se-hyung
- Yang Se-chan
- Yoo Sang-moo
- Jang Dong-min
- Jang Do-yeon
- Jo Se-ho

== Awards and nominations ==
Year	Award	Category	Recipient	Result
2015	51st Baeksang Arts Awards	Best Variety Performer - Female	Lee Guk-joo	Won
2015	51st Baeksang Arts Awards	Best Variety Performer - Female	Jang Do-yeon	Nominated
2016	52nd Baeksang Arts Awards	Best Variety Performer - Female	Jang Do-yeon	Nominated
2016	52nd Baeksang Arts Awards	Best Variety Performer - Female	Park Na-rae	Nominated
2016	tvN10 Awards	Best Content Award, Variety	Comedy Big League	Won
2016	tvN10 Awards	Best Comedian	Yang Se-hyung	Won
2016	tvN10 Awards	Best Comedian	Jang Dong-min	Nominated
2016	tvN10 Awards	Best Comedian	Lee Jin-ho	Nominated
2016	tvN10 Awards	Best Comedian	Yang Se-chan	Nominated
2016	tvN10 Awards	Best Comedienne	Ahn Young-mi	Won
2016	tvN10 Awards	Best Comedienne	Jang Do-yeon	Nominated
2016	tvN10 Awards	Best Comedienne	Lee Guk-joo	Nominated
2016	tvN10 Awards	Best Comedienne	Park Na-rae	Nominated
2016	tvN10 Awards	Made in tvN, Actor in Variety	Lee Sang-joon	Nominated
2016	tvN10 Awards	Made in tvN, Actress in Variety	Park Na-rae	Nominated
2016	tvN10 Awards	Variety "Slave" Award	Lee Se-young	Won
2016	tvN10 Awards	Variety "Slave" Award	Jang Do-yeon	Nominated
2017	53rd Baeksang Arts Awards	Best Variety Performer - Female	Jang Do-yeon	Nominated
