= Yang Se-chan =

South Korean comedian and singer (born 1986)

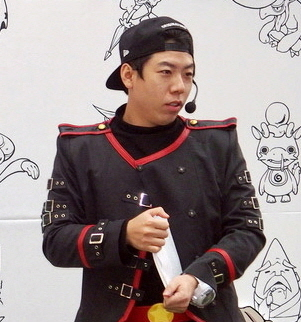
- Yang in 2015
- Born: December 8, 1986 (age 39); Dongducheon, South Korea
- Years active: 2005–present
- Agent: Antenna
- Relatives: Yang Se-hyung (brother)

Korean name
- Hangul: 양세찬
- Hanja: 梁世燦
- RR: Yang Sechan
- MR: Yang Sech'an
- Musical career
- Genre: Hip-hop
- Instrument: Vocal
- Years active: 2008-present
- Website: https://www.antenna.co.kr/251

Yang Se-chan (Korean: 양세찬; born December 8, 1986) is a South Korean comedian, television personality and singer. Se-chan is known for being a cast of the television shows Comedy Big League and Running Man.

== Career ==
Se-chan made his debut in July 2005 through the SBS comedy show 'People Looking for Laughter (웃음을 찾는 사람들)', appearing in the segment “Ttappada.”

On December 12, 2008, Se-chan debuted in his musical career with the single album 'ONLY ONE', alongside comedians Lee Yong-jin and Lee Jin-ho. The three were cast-mates in the segment 'Woong-i's Father" of the SBS comedy show 'People Looking for Laughter'.

After Se-chan's military discharge, he joins the cast for 'Comedy Big League Season 3', that premiered on May 12, 2012. Se-chan would be a regular member of the succeeding seasons.

On January 16, 2015, Se-chan signs with SH Holding's subsidiary A9 Media.

In April 2017, Yang, along with Jeon So-min, was added as a regular cast member of South Korean variety show Running Man.

In January 2024, Yang signed with new agency Antenna.

== Personal life ==
Se-chan was born on December 8, 1986 in Dongducheon South Korea. He has an older brother named Yang Se-hyuk, who is also a comedian.

On July 20, 2010, Se-chan enlisted for the mandatory military service. He was discharged on April 30, 2012.

On March 26, 2013, Se-chan revealed that he was battling thyroid cancer and was scheduled for surgery the following month.

On July 14, 2014, Se-chan and his brother Se-hyung announced the loss of their father due to cancer.

== Filmography ==
=== Television shows ===
Year	Title	Role	Notes
2006 – 2009	People Looking for Laughter (웃음을 찾는 사람들)	Cast Member	
2010	Hatangsasa (하땅사): Needless Pride (괜한 자존심)	Cast Member	
2012– Present	Comedy Big League Season 3, 4, 5	Cast Member	
2013	Rollercoaster Season 3	Cast Member	
2015	Time House	Cast Member	
2016	Voice of God	Contestant with his brother, Yang Se-hyung	
2016	A Man Who Feeds The Dog Season 1	Cast Member	Episode 17 – 50
2016	Foreign Comedians	Cast Member	
2016	I Love You	Cast Member	
2016 – 2017	We Got Married (Season 4)	Chuseok Couple	As panelists with Park Na-rae (episode 338)
2016 – 2017	Yang Se-chan's 10	Host	
2017	Yang Se-chan's 10 Season 2	Host	
2017	1 vs 100	Contestant	
2017	Yang Se-chan's Idol Expert		
2017 – present	Running Man	Cast member	Episodes 346 – present
2017	Battle Trip	Contestant	With Lee Yong-jin (episodes 37–38)
2017	Food Map 3	Cast member	
2017	Thinking About My Bias	Pilot	
2017	The King of Hu Tong		
2017	Living Together in Empty Room	Cast Member	With Brave Brothers and Jeon So-min (episodes 1–4)
2018	Royal Adventure	Cast Member	
2018	Today Swag	Cast Member	
2018 – 2019	Law of the Jungle in Northern Mariana Islands	Cast Member	Episodes 344 – 348
2019	Love Me Actually	Cast Member	Episode 1 – 20
2019	Scene's Quiz	Cast Member	Episode 1 – 6
2019 – 2020	Happy Farmer Expertion S3	Cast Member	Episode 1 – present
2019 – 2020	Rewind	Cast Member	
2019 – 2020	The Ranksters	Cast Member	
2020	Money Road (돈길만 걸어요 - 정산회담)	Cast	
2020	Three Idiots	Cast member	with Lee Sang-yeob, Hwang kwang-hee
2020–2021	Fly Shoot Dori — New Beginning	MC	Episode 1 — present
2021	Ceremony Club	Main cast	
2021	Ho Dong's Camping Zone: Let's Choose	Regular Member	
2021	Racket Boys	Club Assistant	
2021	Alphabet together	Cast Member	Chucheok Special
2022	Fantastic Family	Judge	
2022	Talk Pa One 25 o'clock	Host	
2022	Dog-Daughter-in-law	Host	
2022–2023	Golf Battle: Birdie Buddies	Contestant	Season 4–5
2023	Myeongdong Love Room	Manager	
2023	No Math School Trip	Cast Member	
2024	Country life of Gen-Z	Cast member	
2026	PunghyangGo 2	Cast member	

=== Web shows ===
Year	Title	Role	Notes	Ref.
2016	5 Brothers of Corn	Cast Member		
2021–2022	Change Days	Host	Season 1–2	
2022	Goblin Stealing Wisdom	Host		

=== Television Series ===
Year	Title	Role	Ref.
2015	Angry Mom (앵그리맘)	Cameo	

=== Music video appearances ===
Year	Song title	Artist	Ref.
2013	"Sawedged Perch"	Lee Jae-hyeong	
2017	"Hot Sugar" (뜨거운 설탕)	Turbo	

== Discography ==
Year	Title	Singer	Album
2008	All I Need Is You	웅이네	Only One
2008	한번만 더	웅이네	Only One
2008	끌려	웅이네	Only One
2009	못말려 정말	웅이네	The 2nd Story
2009	잘해줄게 feat. Shim Eun-Jin	웅이네	The 2nd Story
2009	여름이 왔어	웅이네	The 2nd Story
2016	견습생 feat. 4minute's Jeon Ji-yoon	Yang Brothers (Yang Se-chan and Yang Se-hyung)	A Man Who Feeds the Dog
2016	GO	파이브스타 (Yang Se-chan, Lee Jin-ho, Lee Yong-jin, Nam Chang-hee, Jo Se-ho, Yoo Se-yoon)	Mobidic
2019	"Bonjour, Hi" (봉주르 하이) (ft. Yoon Mi-rae)	Hyo Chan Gong Won (효찬공원) "Song Ji-hyo, Yang Se-chan, Code Kunst and Nucksal"	Running Man Fan Meeting:Project Running 9
2019	"I Like It"	Running Man	Running Man Fan Meeting:Project Running 9
2021		"So Good" Hwangtae and Yang Mi-ri (ft.Yoon Bo-mi)	—N/a

== Awards and nominations ==
Name of the award ceremony, year presented, category, nominee of the award, and the result of the nomination
Award	Year	Category	Nominee(s) / Work(s)	Result	Ref.
KBS Entertainment Awards	2020	Excellence Award in Show/Variety Category	Fly Shoot Dori - New Beginning	Nominated	
MBC Entertainment Awards	2017	Male Rookie Award in Variety Show	We Got Married	Nominated	
MBC Entertainment Awards	2022	Excellence Award, Music/Talk Category	Where is My Home	Won	
SBS Entertainment Awards	2008	Excellence Comedy Award	People Looking for Laughter: Woong-i's Father (웅이아버지)	Won	
SBS Entertainment Awards	2019	Excellence Award in Show/Variety Category	Running Man	Won	
SBS Entertainment Awards	2020	Golden Content Award	With Running Man members	Won	
SBS Entertainment Awards	2021	Top Excellence Award in Variety Category	Running Man	Won	
SBS Entertainment Awards	2025	Producer Award	Running Man	Won	
tvN10 Awards	2016	Best Comedian	Comedy Big League	Nominated	
