= Plus Nine Boys =

- Promotional poster
- Also known as: Boys Whose Ages End in Nine; Age Ending in Nine Boy
- Genre: Romance, Comedy
- Written by: Park Yoo-mi
- Directed by: Yoo Hak-chan
- Starring: Kim Young-kwang; Yook Sung-jae; Oh Jung-se; Choi Ro-woon
- Country of origin: South Korea
- Original language: Korean
- No. of episodes: 14

Original release
- Network: tvN
- Release: August 29 – October 11, 2014

Plus Nine Boys (Korean: 아홉수 소년; RR: Ahopsu sonyeon; lit. 'Boys Whose Ages End in Nine') is a 2014 South Korean television series starring Kim Young-kwang, Yook Sung-jae, Oh Jung-se and Choi Ro-woon. It aired on tvN from August 29 to October 11, 2014 on Fridays and Saturdays at 20:50 for 14 episodes.

The romantic comedy series is about four males who each confront different challenges in love and work at the cusp of a new decade in their lives.

== Plot ==
There is a common Korean belief that anything plus nine (gu in Korean) is always "cursed" and brings about more hardship than usual, including the ninth year of every decade in one's life.

Gu Kwang-soo is 39 years old. He was once the brilliant PD (production director) of the nation's top live music program. But his fall from grace occurs when members of an indie band he'd cast drop their pants onstage and flash the entire country during a live broadcast (based on a real-life incident on MBC in 2005). Kwang-soo loses his position and gets shunted to another program, a low-rated trivia quiz show. He is desperate to get married, but his workaholic ways leave him little time to date. Kwang-soo often thinks about "the one who got away," his ex-girlfriend Joo Da-in who left him heartbroken when she suddenly broke up with him one day after publicly rejecting his marriage proposal. When they meet again, Da-in is a single mother whose life revolves around her young daughter Eun-seo, and they've just moved into the apartment one floor above Kwang-soo's. Kwang-soo lives with his superstitious older sister Bok-ja and her three sons, Kang Jin-gu, Kang Min-gu, and Kang Dong-gu.

Kang Jin-gu is 29 years old. He is a tour planner for a large vacation travel agency, and he's self-assured, good at his job, and popular with women. But he starts having to reevaluate his whole future when he falls into a one-sided love for the first time in his life. Jin-gu almost confesses his romantic feelings for his friend and co-worker Ma Se-young, who's from a small town, is outspoken and rough around the edges but very loyal. But apart from his fear of being rejected, Jin-gu learns that his stoic best friend Park Jae-bum also likes Se-young.

Kang Min-gu is 19 years old. He is a hot-tempered high school senior and judo athlete. Min-gu dreams of going to his dream college on a judo scholarship, which means giving his all to win a gold medal in his competitive matches. But an upset stomach during a semi-finals match causes him to lose and poop in his pants, and after that embarrassing episode, his judo ranking drops. Min-gu keeps running into a cute but mysterious girl named Han Soo-ah all over town, and he decides that they're fated to be together. Soo-ah is used to having the entire district's high school boys swooning over her, but Min-gu's sincerity eventually wins her over. But Min-gu doesn't know that Soo-ah's hiding some secrets: her real first name is the country bumpkin-sounding Bong-sook, she's two years older than he is and attends a cram school, and that she was once a legendary cussing, tough, party girl in high school.

Kang Dong-gu is 9 years old. He is a child actor who became famous doing food commercials because of his healthy appetite. Dong-gu suddenly feels threatened when during a movie audition, he loses the role to a new rival child actor named Do Min-joon. He soon finds himself in a career slump, with the other stage parents whispering that since he's growing less cute as he gets older, it's become more obvious that he is not good at acting at all. The precocious Dong-gu has also been secretly dating 8-year-old child actress Jang Baek-ji for the past two years, but Baek-ji dumps him for Min-joon.

== Cast ==
=== Main ===
- Oh Jung-se as Goo Kwang-soo
- Kim Young-kwang as Kang Jin-goo
- Yook Sung-jae as Kang Min-goo
- Choi Ro-woon as Kang Dong-goo

=== People around Kang Dong-goo ===
- Lee Chae-mi as Jang Baek-ji
- Park Ha-joon as Do Min-joon

=== People around Kang Min-goo ===
- Park Cho-rong as Han Soo-ah
- Oh Hee-joon as Nam Chang-hee
- Kim Min-ho as Wang Ki-chan

=== People around Kang Jin-goo ===
- Kyung Soo-jin as Ma Se-young
- Kim Hyun-joon as Park Jae-bum
- Park Min-ha as Lee Go-eun
- Lee Jin-ho as Han Goo
- Kim Won-hae as Department head Jo Won-hae
- Hwang Eun-jung as Im Boo-sun
- Hwang Tae-kwang as Kim Cha-jang
- Kim Mi-kyung as Goo Bok-ja

=== People around Goo Kwang-soo ===
- Yoo Da-in as Joo Da-in
- Kim Kang-hyun as Young-hoon
- Kim Se-young as Eun-seo

=== Cameos ===
- Kim Ye-won as Music program host & radio DJ (ep.1)
- Kim Jong-min as Junior (ep.2)
- Kim Ki-wook as Comedian
- Park Na-rae as Comedian
- Kim Shin-young as Victim of years of age ending in 9
- Park Hae-il as Victim of years of age ending in 9
- Sim Kwon-ho as Victim of years of age ending in 9
- Lee Kyung-ae as Victim of years of age ending in 9
- Lee Guk-joo as Kang Min-kyung
- Jun Hyun-moo as himself (ep.5)
- Park Subin as Girl at the night club (ep.5)
- Lee Se-young as Sun-ah
- Park Eun-ji as Woman on a blind date (ep.7)
- Standing Egg as Themselves (ep.8)
- John Park as Dance audition judge (ep.8)
- Hwang Min-woo as Kang Dong-goo's audition rival (ep.8)
- Kim Min-young as Jung Yeon
- Lee Jin-kwon as Cameo
- Park Hyuk-kwon as Fortune-teller

== Ratings ==
- In this table, the blue numbers represent the lowest ratings and the red numbers represent the highest ratings.
- N/A denotes that the rating is not known.

Ep.	Original broadcast date	Title	Average audience share
Ep.	Original broadcast date	Title	AGB Nielsen
Ep.	Original broadcast date	Title	Nationwide
1	August 29, 2014	The plus-nine effect	1.08%
2	August 30, 2014	Suddenly one day	0.85%
3	September 5, 2014	It's been a while	0.92%
4	September 6, 2014	When love finds you	—N/a
5	September 12, 2014	Bad boy	0.82%
6	September 13, 2014	We love aliens	—N/a
7	September 19, 2014		0.91%
8	September 20, 2014	Things that make men change	0.80%
9	September 26, 2014	The girls' stories	1.04%
10	September 27, 2014	Celebrating you	1.03%
11	October 3, 2014	A secret I want to tell	1.22%
12	October 4, 2014	Lean on me	1.43%
13	October 10, 2014	Because I love you	0.76%
14	October 11, 2014	Boys become men	0.69%
Average			0.963%

- This drama airs on a cable channel/pay TV which normally has a relatively smaller audience compared to free-to-air TV/public broadcasters (KBS, SBS, MBC and EBS).
