= Sazae =

Sazae may refer to:

- Sazae, a fictional character in Sazae-san, a Japanese comic strip manga series
- Turbo sazae, also known by its Japanese name sazae, a species of sea snail
