= Delicious Rendezvous =

South Korean TV show

- Promotional poster
- Also known as: A Palatial Residence
- Hangul: 맛남의 광장
- Hanja: 맛남의廣場
- Lit.: Tasty Square
- RR: Mannamui gwangjang
- MR: Mannamŭi kwangjang
- Genre: Cuisine; Reality show
- Starring: Baek Jong-won; Yang Se-hyung; Choi Won-young; Kwak Dong-yeon; Choi Ye-bin; Former: Kim Hee-chul; Yoo Byung-jae; Kim Dong-jun; Jay Park; Baek Jin-hee
- Country of origin: South Korea
- Original language: Korean
- No. of episodes: 90 + 1 Pilot

Production
- Running time: 95~100 minutes

Original release
- Network: SBS TV
- Release: December 5, 2019 – September 9, 2021

Delicious Rendezvous (Korean: 맛남의 광장) is a South Korean show. It aired on SBS TV on Thursdays at 21:00 (KST). The show ended on September 9, 2021, after 90 episodes.

== Audience rating ==
Episode	Broadcast date	Rating
Pilot	September 13, 2019	12+
1–8 10–30 32–37 39–90	December 5, 2019 – January 23, 2019; February 6, 2020 – June 25, 2020; July 9, 2020 – August 13, 2020; August 27, 2020 – September 9, 2021	12+
9 31 38	January 30, 2019; July 2, 2020; August 20, 2020	15+

== Broadcast timeline ==
Period	Time (KST)	Type
September 13, 2019	Friday 8:40 PM – 9:30 PM (Part 1); Friday 9:30 PM – 10:20 PM (Part 2)	Pilot
December 5, 2019 – February 27, 2020	Thursday 10:00 PM – 10:40 PM (Part 1); Thursday 10:40 PM – 11:10 PM (Part 2); Thursday 11:10 PM – 11:50 PM (Part 3)	Regular
March 5, 2020 – August 27, 2020	Thursday 10:00 PM – 10:40 PM (Part 1); Thursday 10:40 PM – 11:10 PM (Part 2); Thursday 11:10 PM – 11:40 PM (Part 3)	Regular
September 3, 2020 – September 17, 2020	Thursday 8:55 PM – 9:35 PM (Part 1); Thursday 9:35 PM – 10:05 PM (Part 2); Thursday 10:05 PM – 10:35 PM (Part 3)	Regular
September 24, 2020 – June 26, 2021	Thursday 9:00 PM – 9:37 PM (Part 1); Thursday 9:38 PM – 9:50 PM (Part 2); Thursday 9:51 PM – 10:26 PM (Part 3)	Regular
July 1, 2021 – September 9, 2021	Thursday 9:00 PM – 10:30 PM	Regular (Integrated programming (including terrestrial and general TV interim advertisements))

== Format ==
Delicious Rendezvous is a program that develops new menus using low demand local specialties to help farmers. Originally, the concept was to sell these menus at meeting places with large floating populations, such as rest areas, airports, and railway stations, to make them popular dishes, but this part of the concept was removed after it was noticed that these places simplified the recipes and sold unsatisfactory version of the dishes to the public, leading to negative comments. It was originally scheduled to be aired for only 12 episodes, but continued on for the first half of 2020 due to favorable reviews.

- Delicious Shopping Live – The show's live home shopping broadcasts feature the cast selling a specific local specialty to viewers in order to help out local farmers, and they already have an impressive record of consistently selling out their product each week.
- The King of Salesmen – Baek Jong-won tries to sell a specific local specialty to companies for consumer consumption by developing various products such as home meal kits and new desserts. The products have been reported to have continuously sell out in stores.

== Cast members ==
Cast member	Episode(s)	Ref.
Baek Jong-won, Yang Se-hyung	Episode pilot - 90	
Choi Won-young, Kwak Dong-yeon, Choi Ye-bin	Episodes 78 – 90	
Jay Park, Baek Jin-hee	Episode pilot	
Kim Hee-chul, Kim Dong-jun	Episodes 1 – 78	
Yoo Byung-jae	Episodes 36 – 78	

== List of episodes ==
=== Series overview ===
Year	Episodes	Originally aired	
Year	Episodes	First aired	Last aired
Pilot	1	September 13, 2019	September 13, 2019
2019	4	December 5, 2019	December 26, 2019
2020	51	January 2, 2020	December 24, 2020
2021	35	January 7, 2021	September 9, 2021

=== 2019 ===
List of episodes in 2019 (episode 1–4)

Episodes	Broadcast date	Region	Local Specialties	Remark
Pilot	September 13, 2019	North Chungcheong Province, Yeongdong County; Gyeongbu Expressway, Hwanggan Service Area	Shiitake, Maize, Peach	
1	December 5, 2019	Gangwon Province, Gangneung; Donghae Expressway, Okgye Service Area	Korean sandlance, Beni-zuwai Crab, Potato	
2	December 12, 2019	Gangwon Province, Gangneung; Donghae Expressway, Okgye Service Area	Korean sandlance, Beni-zuwai Crab, Potato	Special Guest: Chung Yong-jin (via phone)
3	December 19, 2019	North Jeolla Province, Jangsu County; Tongyeong–Daejeon Expressway, Deogyusan Service Area	Hanwoo, Apple	
4	December 26, 2019	North Jeolla Province, Jangsu County; Tongyeong–Daejeon Expressway, Deogyusan Service Area	Hanwoo, Apple	

=== 2020 ===
List of episodes in 2020 (episode 5–55)

Episodes	Broadcast date	Region	Local Specialties	Remark
5	January 2, 2020	North Gyeongsang Province, Yeongcheon; Saemangeum–Pohang Expressway, Yeongcheon Service Area	Domestic pig, Garlic	
6	January 9, 2020	North Gyeongsang Province, Yeongcheon; Saemangeum–Pohang Expressway, Yeongcheon Service Area	Domestic pig, Garlic	Kim Dong-jun's parents made a surprise visit
7	January 16, 2020	South Jeolla Province, Yeosu; Yeosu Airport	Mustard Green, Japanese anchovy	
8	January 23, 2020	South Jeolla Province, Yeosu; Yeosu Airport	Mustard Green, Japanese anchovy	
9	January 30, 2020	Jeju Province, Seogwipo; Jeju Olle Tourist Center	Olive flounder, Carrot, Mandarin orange	Guest: Lee Na-eun (April); Lee Na-eun's parents made a surprise visit (Ep. 12)
10	February 6, 2020	Jeju Province, Seogwipo; Jeju Olle Tourist Center	Olive flounder, Carrot, Mandarin orange	Guest: Lee Na-eun (April); Lee Na-eun's parents made a surprise visit (Ep. 12)
11	February 13, 2020	Chungcheong-do, Gongju; Nonsan–Cheonan Expressway, Tancheon Service Area	Chestnut, Strawberry	Guest: Lee Na-eun (April); Lee Na-eun's parents made a surprise visit (Ep. 12)
12	February 20, 2020	Chungcheong-do, Gongju; Nonsan–Cheonan Expressway, Tancheon Service Area	Chestnut, Strawberry	Guest: Lee Na-eun (April); Lee Na-eun's parents made a surprise visit (Ep. 12)
13	February 27, 2020	South Gyeongsang Province, Namhae County	Spinach, Hard-shelled mussel	Guests: Jay Park, Lee Na-eun (April)
14	March 5, 2020	South Gyeongsang Province, Namhae County	Spinach, Hard-shelled mussel	Guests: Jay Park, Lee Na-eun (April)
15	March 12, 2020	South Gyeongsang Province, Namhae County	Spinach, Hard-shelled mussel	Guests: Jay Park, Lee Na-eun (April)
16	March 19, 2020	South Jeolla Province, Jindo County	Scallion, Bomdong	Guest: Song Ga-in; Song Ga-in's parents made a surprise visit (Ep. 17)
17	March 26, 2020	South Jeolla Province, Jindo County	Scallion, Bomdong	Guest: Song Ga-in; Song Ga-in's parents made a surprise visit (Ep. 17)
18	April 2, 2020	South Jeolla Province, Jindo County	Scallion, Bomdong	Guest: Song Ga-in; Song Ga-in's parents made a surprise visit (Ep. 17)
19	April 9, 2020	South Jeolla Province, Haenam County	Gim, Sweet potato	Guests: Hong Jin-young; Special Guest: Lee Na-eun (April) (Ep. 21)
20	April 16, 2020	South Jeolla Province, Haenam County	Gim, Sweet potato	Guests: Hong Jin-young; Special Guest: Lee Na-eun (April) (Ep. 21)
21	April 23, 2020	South Jeolla Province, Haenam County	Gim, Sweet potato	Guests: Hong Jin-young; Special Guest: Lee Na-eun (April) (Ep. 21)
22	April 30, 2020	North Jeolla Province, Gunsan	Webfoot octopus, Yeolmu	Guest: Soyou; Special Guest: Lee Na-eun (April)
23	May 7, 2020	North Jeolla Province, Gunsan	Webfoot octopus, Yeolmu	Guest: Soyou; Special Guest: Lee Na-eun (April)
24	May 14, 2020	North Jeolla Province, Gunsan	Webfoot octopus, Yeolmu	Guest: Soyou; Special Guest: Lee Na-eun (April)
25	May 21, 2020	Gyeonggi Province, Yongin	Mu, Bok choy	Guest: Kyuhyun (Super Junior); Special Guests: Jay Park (via phone) (Ep. 25), Lee Na-eun (April) (Ep. 26–27)
26	May 28, 2020	Gyeonggi Province, Yongin	Mu, Bok choy	Guest: Kyuhyun (Super Junior); Special Guests: Jay Park (via phone) (Ep. 25), Lee Na-eun (April) (Ep. 26–27)
27	June 4, 2020	Gyeonggi Province, Yongin	Mu, Bok choy	Guest: Kyuhyun (Super Junior); Special Guests: Jay Park (via phone) (Ep. 25), Lee Na-eun (April) (Ep. 26–27)
28	June 11, 2020	South Jeolla Province, Wando County	Dasima, Abalone; Special Ingredient: Back Leg	Guest: Jay Park; Special Guests (Ep. 28): Lee Na-eun (April), Kyuhyun (Super Junior), Ham Young-joon (via phone)
29	June 18, 2020	South Jeolla Province, Wando County	Dasima, Abalone; Special Ingredient: Back Leg	Guest: Jay Park; Special Guests (Ep. 28): Lee Na-eun (April), Kyuhyun (Super Junior), Ham Young-joon (via phone)
30	June 25, 2020	Gangwon Province, Cheorwon County	Bell pepper, Milk	Guest: Yang Dong-geun
31	July 2, 2020	Gangwon Province, Cheorwon County	Bell pepper, Milk	Guest: Yang Dong-geun
32	July 9, 2020	Gangwon Province, Cheorwon County	Bell pepper, Milk	Guest: Yang Dong-geun
33	July 16, 2020	Gyeonggi Province, Yeoju	Eggplant, Pearl oyster mushroom	Guest: Yoo Byung-jae
34	July 23, 2020	Gyeonggi Province, Yeoju	Eggplant, Pearl oyster mushroom	Guest: Yoo Byung-jae
35	July 30, 2020	Gyeonggi Province, Yeoju	Eggplant, Pearl oyster mushroom	Guest: Yoo Byung-jae
36	August 6, 2020	South Gyeongsang Province, Tongyeong	Whitespotted conger, Sweet potato stems	Yoo Byung-jae joins as a fixed cast member
37	August 13, 2020	South Gyeongsang Province, Tongyeong	Whitespotted conger, Sweet potato stems	
38	August 20, 2020	South Gyeongsang Province, Tongyeong	Whitespotted conger, Sweet potato stems	
39	August 27, 2020	Gyeonggi Province, Yangpyeong County	Garlic chives, Mung bean sprouts	Guest: Sunmi
40	September 3, 2020	Gyeonggi Province, Yangpyeong County	Garlic chives, Mung bean sprouts	Guest: Sunmi
41	September 10, 2020	Gyeonggi Province, Yangpyeong County	Garlic chives, Mung bean sprouts	Guest: Sunmi
42	September 17, 2020	Gangwon Province, Yanggu-gun	Siraegi	Guest: Jisoo (Blackpink)
43	September 24, 2020	Gangwon Province, Yanggu-gun	Siraegi	Guest: Jisoo (Blackpink)
43	September 24, 2020	Gangwon Province, Hwacheon County	Zucchini	Guest: Jisoo (Blackpink)
44	October 1, 2020	Gangwon Province, Hwacheon County	Zucchini	Guest: Jisoo (Blackpink)
45	October 8, 2020	South Chungcheong Province, Yesan County	Yesan Apple, Shishito Pepper	Guest: Jung Joon-ho
46	October 15, 2020	South Chungcheong Province, Yesan County	Yesan Apple, Shishito Pepper	Guest: Jung Joon-ho
47	October 22, 2020	South Chungcheong Province, Yesan County	Yesan Apple, Shishito Pepper	Guest: Jung Joon-ho
48	October 29, 2020	South Gyeongsang Province, Geoje	Red seabream	Guest: Arin (Oh My Girl)
49	November 5, 2020	South Jeolla Province, Boseong County	Brown Enoki Mushroom	Guest: Arin (Oh My Girl)
50	November 19, 2020	South Jeolla Province, Boseong County	Domestic Duck, Chives	Guest: Taemin (Shinee); Special Guest: Lee Na-eun (April) (Ep. 51–52)
51	November 26, 2020	South Jeolla Province, Boseong County	Domestic Duck, Chives	Guest: Taemin (Shinee); Special Guest: Lee Na-eun (April) (Ep. 51–52)
52	December 3, 2020	South Jeolla Province, Boseong County	Domestic Duck, Chives	Guest: Taemin (Shinee); Special Guest: Lee Na-eun (April) (Ep. 51–52)
52	December 3, 2020	Gangwon Province, Sokcho	Korean sandlance, Beni-zuwai Crab	Guests: fromis 9 (Gyuri, Jisun); One Year Anniversary Special
53	December 10, 2020	Gangwon Province, Sokcho	Korean sandlance, Beni-zuwai Crab	Guests: fromis 9 (Gyuri, Jisun); One Year Anniversary Special
54	December 17, 2020	Gangwon Province, Sokcho	Korean sandlance, Beni-zuwai Crab	Guests: fromis 9 (Gyuri, Jisun); One Year Anniversary Special
55	December 24, 2020	Jeju Province, Jeju-si	Cabbage, Yellow Corvina	Guest: Lee Ji-ah

=== 2021 ===
List of episodes in 2021 (episode 56–90)

Episodes	Broadcast date	Region	Local Specialties	Remark
56	January 7, 2021	Jeju Province, Jeju-si	Cabbage, Yellow Corvina	Guest: Lee Ji-ah; Special Guests: BTS (via video call) (Ep. 57)
57	January 14, 2021	North Gyeongsang Province, Pohang	Spinach, Gwamegi	Guest: Lee Ji-ah; Special Guests: BTS (via video call) (Ep. 57)
58	January 21, 2021	North Gyeongsang Province, Pohang	Spinach, Gwamegi	Guest: Lee Ji-ah; Special Guests: BTS (via video call) (Ep. 57)
59	January 28, 2021	South Chungcheong Province, Cheonan	Pork	Guest: Shin Ye-eun; Special Guests (Ep. 59): Park Hae-woong (via video call), Kwon Ki-beom (via video call), Lee Geun-jun, Heo Tae-geon, Lee Sung-hee, BTS
60	February 4, 2021	South Chungcheong Province, Cheonan	Pork	Guest: Shin Ye-eun; Special Guests (Ep. 59): Park Hae-woong (via video call), Kwon Ki-beom (via video call), Lee Geun-jun, Heo Tae-geon, Lee Sung-hee, BTS
61	February 11, 2021	South Chungcheong Province, Yesan County	—N/a	Guests: Jung Joon-ho, Lee Sun-bin, Song So-hee; Seollal Special
62	February 18, 2021	South Chungcheong Province, Yesan County	—N/a	Guests: Jung Joon-ho, Lee Sun-bin, Song So-hee; Seollal Special
63	February 25, 2021	South Jeolla Province, Haenam County	Napa cabbage, Gim	Guests: Jay Park, Lee Na-eun (April)
64	March 4, 2021	South Jeolla Province, Haenam County	Napa cabbage, Gim	Guests: Jay Park, Lee Na-eun (April)
65	March 11, 2021	South Gyeongsang Province, Changwon	Water celery, Hard shelled Mussel	Guest: Kim Jung-eun; Special Guest: Koo Yoon-hee (Ep. 65)
66	March 18, 2021	South Gyeongsang Province, Changwon	Water celery, Hard shelled Mussel	Guest: Kim Jung-eun; Special Guest: Koo Yoon-hee (Ep. 65)
67	March 25, 2021	Ulsan, Dong-gu; Busan, Gijang County	Righteye flounders, Wakame	Guest: Han Go-eun
68	April 1, 2021	Ulsan, Dong-gu; Busan, Gijang County	Righteye flounders, Wakame	Guest: Han Go-eun
69	April 8, 2021	Jeju Province, Seogwipo	Mu, Horned turban	Guest: Lee Chung-ah
70	April 15, 2021	Jeju Province, Seogwipo	Mu, Horned turban	Guest: Lee Chung-ah
71	April 22, 2021	South Jeolla Province, Wando County	Hijiki, Abalone	Guest: Sung Yu-ri
72	April 29, 2021	South Jeolla Province, Wando County	Hijiki, Abalone	Guest: Sung Yu-ri
73	May 6, 2021	South Chungcheong Province, Buyeo County	Perilla, Button Mushroom	Guest: Sung Si-kyung
74	May 13, 2021	South Chungcheong Province, Buyeo County	Perilla, Button Mushroom	Guest: Sung Si-kyung
75	May 20, 2021	South Gyeongsang Province, Geoje	Bamboo shoot, Japanese anchovy	Guest: Oh Na-ra
76	May 27, 2021	South Gyeongsang Province, Geoje	Bamboo shoot, Japanese anchovy	Guest: Oh Na-ra
77	June 3, 2021	North Jeolla Province, Jeongeup	Tomato, Potato	Guest: Uee; Kim Hee-chul, Yoo Byung-jae and Kim Dong-jun last episode (up to part 2 of episode 78) and Choi Won-young, Kwak Dong-yeon and Choi Ye-bin join (from part 3 of episode 78).
78	June 10, 2021	North Jeolla Province, Jeongeup	Tomato, Potato	Guest: Uee; Kim Hee-chul, Yoo Byung-jae and Kim Dong-jun last episode (up to part 2 of episode 78) and Choi Won-young, Kwak Dong-yeon and Choi Ye-bin join (from part 3 of episode 78).
79	June 17, 2021	Gangwon Province, Jeongseon County	Cirsium setidens, Asparagus	
80	June 24, 2021	Gangwon Province, Jeongseon County	Cirsium setidens, Asparagus	
81	July 1, 2021	North Gyeongsang Province, Seongju County	Oriental melon, Onion	
82	July 8, 2021	North Gyeongsang Province, Seongju County	Oriental melon, Onion	
83	July 15, 2021	South Gyeongsang Province, Namhae County, Yangsan	Japanese pumpkin, Carrot	
84	July 22, 2021	South Gyeongsang Province, Namhae County, Yangsan	Japanese pumpkin, Carrot	
85	August 5, 2021	North Chungcheong Province, Goesan County	Corn, Beef	
86	August 12, 2021	North Chungcheong Province, Goesan County	Corn, Beef	
87	August 19, 2021	Jeju Province	Largehead hairtail, Green onion	Guest (episode 88): Shim Yi-young
88	August 26, 2021	Jeju Province	Largehead hairtail, Green onion	Guest (episode 88): Shim Yi-young
89	September 2, 2021	5 most memorable dishes revisiting previous specialties	Bamboo Shoot, Dasima, Horned Turban, Pork, Brown Enoki Mushroom	Last Broadcast Guests (episode 90): Kim Hee-chul and Yoo Byung-jae
90	September 9, 2021	5 most memorable dishes revisiting previous specialties	Bamboo Shoot, Dasima, Horned Turban, Pork, Brown Enoki Mushroom	Last Broadcast Guests (episode 90): Kim Hee-chul and Yoo Byung-jae

== Ratings ==
List of ratings in 2019 (episode 1–4)

2019
Ep. #	Broadcast date	TNmS			AGB Nielsen					
Ep. #	Broadcast date	Nationwide			Nationwide			Capital area		
Ep. #	Broadcast date	Part 1	Part 2	Part 3	Part 1	Part 2	Part 3	Part 1	Part 2	Part 3
Pilot	September 13, 2019		6.7%	－	3.8%	6.0%	－		6.7%	－
1	December 5, 2019		5.0%	5.5%	4.1%	5.1%	5.9%	5.4%	5.5%	6.8%
2	December 12, 2019	5.7%	6.1%	6.7%	5.3%	7.0%	7.2%	6.2%	8.4%	8.8%
3	December 19, 2019	6.0%	6.7%	6.8%	4.9%	5.8%	6.6%	5.2%	6.5%	7.4%
4	December 26, 2019	6.4%	6.9%	7.9%	5.5%	6.3%	8.2%	6.2%	7.4%	9.2%

List of ratings in 2020 (episode 5-55)

2020
Ep. #	Broadcast date	TNmS			AGB Nielsen					
Ep. #	Broadcast date	Nationwide			Nationwide			Capital area		
Ep. #	Broadcast date	Part 1	Part 2	Part 3	Part 1	Part 2	Part 3	Part 1	Part 2	Part 3
5	January 2, 2020	6.3%	7.4%	8.2%	5.2%	6.2%	7.2%	5.6%	6.7%	8.3%
6	January 9, 2020	5.4%	5.9%	5.9%	5.3%	5.8%	6.6%	6.2%	6.6%	7.9%
7	January 16, 2020		5.4%	5.9%	4.6%	5.2%	5.9%	5.2%	5.9%	6.5%
8	January 23, 2020		5.8%	6.4%	5.6%	5.7%	6.5%	6.0%	5.9%	6.9%
9	January 30, 2020				5.0%	6.2%	6.0%	5.4%	6.7%	6.8%
10	February 6, 2020		5.4%	5.4%	5.0%	5.8%	5.8%	5.8%	6.8%	6.5%
11	February 13, 2020	6.0%	6.6%	6.4%	5.1%	6.0%	7.0%	5.5%	7.0%	8.2%
12	February 20, 2020		5.0%		4.0%	4.8%	4.9%		5.5%	5.5%
13	February 27, 2020	5.8%	6.3%		4.5%	5.5%	5.7%		6.4%	6.7%
14	March 5, 2020				4.7%	5.1%	5.1%	5.4%	5.7%	5.8%
15	March 12, 2020				3.9%	4.1%	4.0%		4.9%	
16	March 19, 2020			6.8%	4.3%	6.0%	5.8%		6.9%	6.8%
17	March 26, 2020		6.8%	6.1%	5.3%	6.8%	6.1%		7.5%	6.8%
18	April 2, 2020	5.4%	6.2%		5.2%	5.7%	4.7%	5.6%	5.8%	5.2%
19	April 9, 2020		5.9%	6.4%	5.1%	6.2%	6.6%	5.3%	6.8%	7.0%
20	April 16, 2020		6.5%		5.4%	7.6%	5.7%		7.5%	5.5%
21	April 23, 2020	5.6%	7.7%	6.3%	5.2%	7.4%	5.9%	5.3%	7.7%	6.3%
22	April 30, 2020		6.5%	6.6%	4.4%	5.7%	5.4%		6.0%	5.9%
23	May 7, 2020		5.6%	5.3%	3.9%	4.9%	4.3%		5.1%	4.5%
24	May 14, 2020	4.3%	5.5%	5.6%	3.8%	5.6%	4.6%		5.1%	4.4%
25	May 21, 2020		5.5%	5.6%	3.5%	4.4%	4.8%		4.4%	5.1%
26	May 28, 2020			5.3%	3.3%	2.9%	4.2%			4.2%
27	June 4, 2020		5.6%		3.3%	5.1%	3.7%		5.5%	
28	June 11, 2020	5.2%	5.9%	5.8%	4.7%	5.2%	5.6%	4.8%	5.6%	6.2%
29	June 18, 2020		5.2%	5.2%		4.8%	4.6%		5.1%	5.1%
30	June 25, 2020		5.2%	4.9%	3.1%	4.9%	4.4%		5.5%	5.2%
31	July 2, 2020			4.9%	3.1%	3.8%	3.6%		4.3%	
32	July 9, 2020		5.6%			5.0%	4.6%		5.2%	5.2%
33	July 16, 2020	4.1%	5.0%			5.1%			5.2%	
34	July 23, 2020		5.4%	5.5%		5.1%	4.8%		5.7%	5.4%
35	July 30, 2020		5.0%	5.2%		5.0%	4.7%		5.6%	5.4%
36	August 6, 2020		5.8%	5.4%		4.9%	4.9%		5.7%	5.5%
37	August 13, 2020		4.9%	4.9%		4.1%			4.4%	4.1%
38	August 20, 2020		5.3%			4.4%			4.6%	4.1%
39	August 27, 2020		5.3%			5.3%			5.4%	5.4%
40	September 3, 2020	5.2%	5.1%	5.1%		4.9%	5.3%		4.8%	5.8%
41	September 9, 2020		4.4%			4.2%		4.2%	4.5%	
42	September 17, 2020	5.3%	5.6%	4.7%	4.5%	4.8%		5.0%	5.4%	4.1%
43	September 24, 2020		4.5%			4.4%			4.4%	
44	October 1, 2020					3.3%				
45	October 8, 2020	4.1%			4.6%			5.0%	4.8%	4.7%
46	October 15, 2020	4.6%	5.0%	4.4%	4.6%	4.7%		5.0%	5.0%	
47	October 22, 2020			4.3%	4.7%	4.7%	4.7%	5.6%	5.2%	5.5%
48	October 29, 2020					4.4%			4.4%	
49	November 5, 2020		4.6%			4.8%			5.2%	4.6%
50	November 19, 2020			4.8%		5.2%	5.1%	5.1%	5.9%	5.6%
51	November 26, 2020		5.6%	6.3%		5.4%	5.5%		5.5%	5.9%
52	December 3, 2020	5.1%	4.8%	4.7%			4.7%			5.0%
53	December 10, 2020		5.5%	4.4%		5.4%			5.3%	
54	December 17, 2020		4.6%		4.6%			4.8%		
55	December 24, 2020		6.2%	5.4%		5.4%			5.9%	4.9%

List of ratings in 2021 (episode 56–90)

2021
Ep. #	Broadcast date	TNmS			AGB Nielsen					
Ep. #	Broadcast date	Nationwide			Nationwide			Capital area		
Ep. #	Broadcast date	Part 1	Part 2	Part 3	Part 1	Part 2	Part 3	Part 1	Part 2	Part 3
56	January 7, 2021		6.1%	5.6%		5.8%	5.7%	5.4%	6.3%	6.3%
57	January 14, 2021	4.9%	5.2%		5.4%	7.0%	6.7%		6.4%	5.6%
58	January 21, 2021	5.7%	5.5%	5.0%	5.0%	5.4%		5.2%	5.9%	
59	January 28, 2021		5.1%			4.9%			5.1%	4.9%
60	February 4, 2021		4.7%		4.4%	4.9%			4.7%	
61	February 11, 2021			5.3%			4.7%			
62	February 18, 2021				4.1%					
63	February 25, 2021		4.2%			4.5%			4.4%	
64	March 4, 2021					3.8%				
65	March 11, 2021					3.9%				
66	March 18, 2021					4.0%				
67	March 25, 2021		4.5%	4.3%		4.2%	4.2%		4.4%	4.3%
68	April 1, 2021					3.6%				
69	April 8, 2021					2.9%				
70	April 15, 2021					3.7%				
71	April 22, 2021					3.5%				
72	April 29, 2021					3.8%				
73	May 6, 2021									
74	May 13, 2021									
75	May 20, 2021									
76	May 27, 2021									
77	June 3, 2021									
78	June 10, 2021									
79	June 17, 2021									
80	June 24, 2021									
81	July 1, 2021									
82	July 8, 2021									
83	July 15, 2021									
84	July 22, 2021									
85	August 5, 2021									
86	August 12, 2021									
87	August 19, 2021									
88	August 26, 2021									
89	September 2, 2021									
90	September 9, 2021									

== Cancellation of broadcasting ==
Date	Scheduled episode	Reason	Notes/References
November 12, 2020	50	2020 KBO League season	Broadcast of the match
December 31, 2020	56	2020 SBS Drama Awards	Broadcast of the Ceremony
July 29, 2021	85	2020 Tokyo Olympics	Live broadcast

== Awards and nominations ==
Year	Award	Category	Recipient	Result	Ref.
2019	13th SBS Entertainment Awards	Grand Prize (Daesang)	Baek Jong-won	Nominated	
2019	13th SBS Entertainment Awards	Lifetime Achievement Award	Baek Jong-won	Won	
2019	13th SBS Entertainment Awards	Honorary Employee Award	Yang Se-hyung	Won	
2019	13th SBS Entertainment Awards	Excellence Award in Reality Category	Kim Hee-chul	Won	
2019	13th SBS Entertainment Awards	Best Challenge Award	Kim Dong-jun	Won	
2020	56th Baeksang Arts Awards	Best Entertainment Program	Delicious Rendezvous	Nominated	
2020	47th Korea Broadcasting Prizes	Entertainment / Variety	Delicious Rendezvous	Won	
2020	14th SBS Entertainment Awards	Grand Prize (Daesang)	Baek Jong-won	Nominated	
2020	14th SBS Entertainment Awards	Grand Prize (Daesang)	Yang Se-hyung	Nominated	
2020	14th SBS Entertainment Awards	Scriptwriter of the Year	Hwang Bo-kyung	Won	
2020	14th SBS Entertainment Awards	Top Excellence Award in Reality Category	Kim Hee-chul	Won	
2020	14th SBS Entertainment Awards	Producer Award	Yang Se-hyung	Won	
2020	14th SBS Entertainment Awards	Excellence Program Award in Reality Category	Delicious Rendezvous	Won	
2021	Korea First Brand Awards	Best Cooking Variety	Delicious Rendezvous	Won	
2021	25th Asian Television Awards	Best General Entertainment Programme	Delicious Rendezvous	Nominated	
