= Yang Se-hyung =

South Korean comedian and entertainer (born 1985)

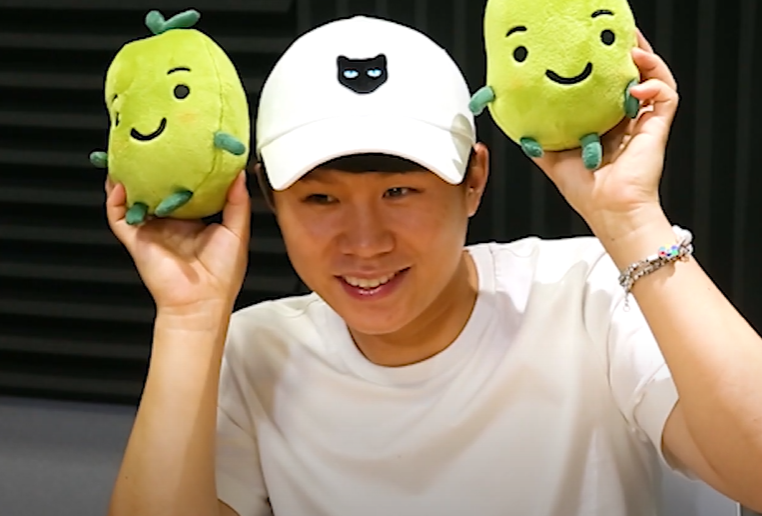
- Yang in 2020
- Born: August 18, 1985 (age 41); Dongducheon, South Korea
- Notable work: Comedy Big League, Infinite Challenge
- Relatives: Yang Se-chan (brother)

Comedy career
- Years active: 2003–present
- Medium: Stand-up, Television
- Genres: Observational, Sketch, Wit, Parody, Slapstick

Korean name
- Hangul: 양세형
- Hanja: 梁世炯
- RR: Yang Sehyeong
- MR: Yang Sehyŏng

Yang Se-hyung (Korean: 양세형; born August 18, 1985) is a South Korean comedian and entertainer. He is most known for his work on the tvN sketch comedy show Comedy Big League and MBC's Infinite Challenge. His younger brother, Yang Se-chan, is also a comedian.

== Career ==
Yang Se-hyung began his entertainment career as a comedian in 2003, as a part of the 7th comedian admission class at SBS which also included comedian Kim Shin-young. In 2005, he made his debut on SBS's People Looking for A Laugh.

=== Controversies ===
In November 2013, Yang and several other celebrities, including Tak Jae-hoon, Andy Lee and Lee Soo-geun, were prosecuted for partaking in illegal gambling. The Seoul Central District Court classified Yang's case as a general gambling crime and he was fined 3 million won. Following his legal issues, the comedian halted his entertainment activities to self-reflect. He returned to 'Comedy Big League' on May 18, 2014.

== Filmography ==
=== Films ===
Year	Title
2005	Never to Lose (강력 3반)
2006	How the Lack of Love Affects Two Men (애정결핍이 두 남자에게 미치는 영향)
2009	In Place (가지 않는, 모든 것들)
2012	Marrying the Mafia 5 - Return of the Family (가문의 영광5 - 가문의 귀환)

=== Television series ===
Year	Title	Role
2011	The Greatest Love	Talkshow host
2011-12	Bolder By the Day	Corporal
2012	A Thousand Kisses	Lawyer
2012	Reply 1997	Ep 10 (Eun Dokki's husband)

=== Variety shows ===
==== Current programs ====
Year	Title	Role	Note
2014–present	Comedy Big League Season 5	Cast member	31 August 2014 – present
2018–present	Omniscient Interfering View	Cast member	Pilot: 29–30 November 2017; 3 March 2018 – present
2017–2023	Master in the House	Cast member	31 December 2017 – April 23, 2023
2021–2022	King of Golf	Cast member	Season 1–4
2022	Will the breakup be a recall?	Host	with Jang Young-ran
2022	Okay, okay!	Host	with Oh Eun-young
2023	Authorized Personnel Only	Cast Member	with Kim Jong-kook and Lee Yi-kyung

==== Former programs ====
Year	Title	Role	Note
2012	Strong Heart	Cast member	27 March 2012 – 12 February 2013
2012	Comedy Big League Season 4	Cast member	29 September 2012 – 1 June 2013
2016	Same Bed, Different Dreams	Semi-fixed panelist	Ep 43 – 44, 48, 50, 52 – 60
2016	A Man Who Feeds The Dog	Cast member	Ep 17 – 50, 8 April 2016 – 25 November 2016
2016	Infinite Challenge	Cast member	De facto member (Ep 474 – 475, 479, 483 – 484, 487– 492, 494 – 520); Cast member 18 March 2017 – 21 April 2018
2016	DISCO - Self-Diss Comic Club	Cast member	Pilot 25 July 2016
2016	Girls Who Eat Well	Co-host	Pilot 29 June 2016 – 6 July 2016
2016	Thanks for the Food	Host	23 July 2016 – 2 February 2017
2016	Yang Nam Show	Host	17 November 2016 – 29 December 2016
2016	Scene Stealer - Drama War	Cast member	5 December 2016 – 30 January 2017
2017	New Yang Nam Show	Host	23 February 2017 – 13 April 2017
2017	Oppa Thinking	Cast member	Ep 1, Ep 16
2017	Crime Scene 3	Cast member	21 April 2017 – 14 July 2017
2017	Home Food Rescue Season 3	Cast member	21 February 2017 – 28 November 2017
2017	Street King	Cast member	Pilot 2 October 2017 – 3 October 2017
2018	Real Life Men and Women	Cast member	11 January 2018 – 15 February 2018
2018	We Will Channel You	Host	25 September 2018 as Chuseok holiday special programme. 15 November 2018 – 9 May 2019
2018	Real Life Men and Women 2	Cast member	10 August 2018 – 23 November 2018
2018	Village Survival, the Eight	Cast member	16 November 2018 – 21 December 2018
2019	Wanna Do	Cast member	1 February 2019 – 5 April 2019
2019	Village Survival, the Eight 2	Cast member	15 February 2019 – 22 March 2019
2019	Love Me Actually	Host	17 March 2019 – 4 August 2019
2019	The Ranksters	Cast member	17 July – 4 September 2019
2019	Delicious Rendezvous	Cast member	13 September 2019 – September 9, 2021
2020	Money Road	Cast member	11 February – 28 April 2020
2020	Law of the Jungle in Palawan	Cast member	28 March – 18 April 2020

=== Web shows ===
Year	Title	Role	Notes	Ref.
2016–2018	Yang Se-hyung's Shorterview	Host	19 June 2016 – 7 June 2018	
2022	Good Advertisement 2	Host		

=== Radio host ===
Year	Title	Role
March 28, 2016 – August 31, 2017	Yoon Hyung-bin, Yang Se-hyung's Two Man Show	Host

== Discography ==
Date	Title	Singer	Album	Role
April 25, 2013	Niphon spinosus	Lee Jae-hyung (이재형)	Niphon spinosus	MV
September 19, 2016	Dog Practitioners feat. 4Minute Jiyoon	Yang Se Brothers (Yang Se-hyung X Yang Se-chan)	A Man Who Feeds the Dog	lyrics, performance, MV
December 31, 2016	Mansae/Hooray	Yang Se-Hyung X BewhY	Infinite Challenge Great Heritage	lyrics, performance
August 2, 2017	Blessed with laughter	Gaevengers (개벤져스)feat. Yoo Jae-suk; Kim Gura, Yang Se-hyung, Kim Joon-ho; Park Mi-sun, Kim Sook, Jo Se-ho...	Blessed with laughter (theme song of Busan International Comedy Festival)	performance, MV
October 13, 2018	HOT Knight	Tony An ft. Yang Se-hyung	HOT Knight	performance
August 8, 2019	Scissors Scissors	Yoo Se-yoon ft. Yang Se-hyung	Never Ending Story	lyrics, performance, MV

== Advertising ==
- 2017 NEXON - TalesRunner R
- 2017 Lotte Chilsung Beverage - Chilsung Strong Cider 5.0
- 2017 Lotte Confectionery - Bugles
- 2017 Tomato Class
- 2017 Goobne Chicken - Volcano Chicken
- 2017 Samsung Pay - Yang Se-hyung and Hong Jin-kyung's Samsung Pay Shopping
- 2017 Dong Kook Pharm - Madecassol Care
- 2016 TMON - Happy BaliBali
- 2016 Tomato TOEIC (2016)
- 2016 Samsung Card - Holgabun Night Market 2016
- 2016 Hatherine Elizabeth - Spot Care
- 2016 King of Kings - Online Games
- 2016 TOOMICS - Webtoon
- 2016 Kellogg's - Chocolate Chex
- 2016 Heineken - Desperados
- 2016 KIA - The New K3
- 2016 Mr. Pizza
- 2012 DaiShin Securities
- Legendz

== Awards and nominations ==
Year	Awards show	Category	Nominated work	Result	Ref.
2006	SBS Entertainment Awards	Comedy Prize - Popularity Award	People Looking for a Laugh	Won	
2012	19th Korean Entertainment Arts Awards	Best Variety Performer–Male	Comedy Big League	Won	
2012	6th Mnet 20's Choice Awards	20's Gag Character	Raitto (Comedy Big League)	Won	
2016	16th MBC Entertainment Awards	Popularity Award	Infinite Challenge	Won	
2016	tvN10 Awards	Best Comedian	Comedy Big League	Won	
2016	10th SBS Entertainment Awards	Mobile Icon Award	Yang Se-hyung's Shorterview	Won	
2017	53rd Baeksang Arts Awards	Best Variety Performer–Male	Yang Se-hyung's Shorterview	Won	
2017	17th MBC Entertainment Awards	Excellence Award in Variety	Infinite Challenge	Won	
2018	12th SBS Entertainment Awards	Top Excellence Award in Show/Talk Category	Master in the House; We Will Channel You; Village Survival, the Eight	Won	
2019	55th Baeksang Arts Awards	Best Variety Performer – Male	Master in the House	Nominated	
2019	19th MBC Entertainment Awards	Top Excellence Award in Music/Talk Category (Male)	Where Is My Home; Omniscient Interfering View	Won	
2019	13th SBS Entertainment Awards	Honorary Employee Award	Master in the House; Delicious Rendezvous; Village Survival, the Eight; We Will Channel You	Won	
2020	32nd Korean PD Awards	Performer Awards - Comedian	Master in the House; Omniscient Interfering View	Won	
2020	14th SBS Entertainment Awards	Grand Prize (Daesang)	Master in the House; Delicious Rendezvous	Nominated	
2020	14th SBS Entertainment Awards	Producer Award	Master in the House; Delicious Rendezvous	Won	
2020	20th MBC Entertainment Awards	Top Excellence Award in Music/Talk Category (Male)	Where Is My Home; Omniscient Interfering View; The Paikfather	Won	
2020	20th MBC Entertainment Awards	Best Couple Award with Baek Jong-won	The Paikfather	Nominated	
2021	48th Korea Broadcasting Awards	Best Male Reality Star	Master in the House	Won	
2021	15th SBS Entertainment Awards	Entertainer of the Year Award	Master in the House	Won	
2021	15th SBS Entertainment Awards	Best Teamwork Award	Master in the House	Won	
2021	21st MBC Entertainment Awards	Best Entertainer Award	Omniscient Interfering View	Won	
2021	21st MBC Entertainment Awards	Best Couple Award with Yoo Byung-jae	Omniscient Interfering View	Nominated	
2022	2022 KBS Entertainment Awards	Rookie Award in Reality Category	Love Recall	Won	
