= Choi Ro-woon =

South Korean actor (born 2007)

- Born: February 16, 2007 (age 19); Pyeongtaek, Gyeonggi Province, South Korea
- Occupation: Actor
- Years active: 2011–present

Korean name
- Hangul: 최로운
- RR: Choe Roun
- MR: Ch'oe Roun

Choi Ro-woon (Korean: 최로운; born February 16, 2007) is a South Korean actor. He has appeared in television series such as Good Doctor (2013) and Plus Nine Boys (2014).

== Filmography ==
=== Television series ===
Year	Title	Role
2011	My Daughter the Flower	Eun Byul
2012	Big	"Teddy Bear"
2012	The Great Seer	child Mok Ji-sang
2013	KBS TV Novel: Eunhui	Seung-mo
2013	Good Doctor	young Park Shi-on
2013	Golden Rainbow	young Kim Young-won
2014	The King's Daughter, Soo Baek-hyang	orphaned boy
2014	I Need Romance 3	child Joo Wan
2014	12 Years Promise	Joo Hong
2014	The Noblesse	Park Joon-hee
2014	Plus Nine Boys	Kang Dong-gu
2015	Flower of Queen	Heo Young-gu
2016	My Little Baby	Cha Hoon-gu
2017	My Sassy Girl	the Heir Presumptive
2018	Life	young Ye Jin-woo
2019	Babel	young Cha Woo-hyuk
2019	Arthdal Chronicles	young Rottip
2019	Pegasus Market	young Kim Gap
2021	The King's Affection	young Lee Hyun

=== Films ===
Year	Title	Role
2013	Incomplete Life: Prequel	Han Suk-Yool
2013	Miracle in Cell No. 7	Jin-Wook
2016	Life Risking Romance	Sul Rok-Hwan (young)
2017	The Return	Jung Han (young)
2018	Happy Together	Ha-neul (child)
2019	The End of That Summer (short film)	Hae-joon
2020	Please Don't Save Me	Jung-guk

=== Variety show ===
Year	Title	Notes
2013	Oh! My Baby	
2015	Youth Express	

=== Music video appearances ===
Year	Song title	Artist	Ref.
2013	"Man in Love"	Infinite	
