= Village Survival, the Eight =

Korean television program

- Promotional poster
- Hangul: 미추리 8-1000
- RR: Michuri 8-1000
- MR: Mich'uri 8-1000
- Genre: Reality; Variety
- Presented by: Yoo Jae-suk
- Country of origin: South Korea
- Original language: Korean
- No. of seasons: 2
- No. of episodes: 12 (list of episodes)

Production
- Executive producer: Gong Hwi-cheol
- Producer: Jeong Cheol-min
- Production locations: Season 1: Yangpyeong County, Gyeonggi Province; Season 2: Seocheon County, South Chungcheong Province
- Running time: 80 minutes

Original release
- Network: SBS TV
- Release: November 16, 2018 – March 22, 2019

Village Survival, The Eight (Korean: 미추리 8-1000; RR: Michuri 8-1000) is a South Korean variety show. The first season aired on SBS TV from November 6 to December 21, 2018. The second season aired from February 15 to March 22, 2019.

== Airtime ==
Season	Air date	Airtime (KST)	
1	November 16 – December 21, 2018	Part 1	Fridays at 11:20 PM
1	November 16 – December 21, 2018	Part 2	Saturdays at 12:00 AM
2	February 15 – March 22, 2019	Part 1	Fridays at 11:10 PM
2	February 15 – March 22, 2019	Part 2	Fridays at 11:50 PM

== Format ==
Eight people are given hint items and 24 hours to solve a mystery in the fictional village of Michuri with Yoo Jae-suk as village head. The reward is worth ₩10 million (US$8,741.64). The first season was shot in Cheongun-myeon, Yangpyeong County, Gyeonggi Province. The second season was shot in Seo-myeon, Seocheon County, South Chungcheong Province. The duration of each filming session is 2 days and 1 night.

Cast members will acquire additional hint items as they play team games. During preparation of meals (lunch and dinner) and before the end of the first day, the cast members may search the village using the hint items acquired.

== Rules ==
- Cast members may not steal another cast member's hint item. Doing so will result in being removed from the show.
- The cast member(s) who found the money must inform Yoo Jae-suk before the end of the show.

=== Season 1 ===
- The cast member who found the money has the option of either taking the ₩10 million, or carry the money over onto the next round to try to earn ₩20 million.
- If the cast member who found the money decided to keep the ₩10 million, then everyone will vote on who they believe took the money.
  - If the majority correctly votes for the person who took the money, the ₩10 million goes back to the production team. (or to charity, if it is the season finale.)
  - If the majority fails to vote for the right person, the cast member who found the money gets to keep it.
- If the cast member who found the money decided to carry the money over onto the next round, he or she will decide on the new hiding location for the money. The other cast members must look for the money in the new location while the cast member who hid the money must try and prevent the others from finding it.
  - If nobody found the money, a vote is held for who they think hid the money. Succeeding will deny the cast member the money, and failing will allow the cast member to keep the ₩20 million.
  - If someone did found the money, the cast member who hid the money earlier will not receive anything. The cast members will then vote on who took the money on that round.

=== Season 2 ===
In season 2, the format was changed. Instead of the money being hid by the production team, a cast member will randomly receive a "red ball". They will be in charge of hiding the money and preventing the other cast members from finding it. In addition, more than one cast member can find the money and split the prize between them. Any of the cast members who found the money will be allowed to keep their share if they succeed in not getting the majority of votes.

== Cast ==
Cast Member	Season 1						Season 2					
Cast Member	1	2	3	4	5	6	1	2	3	4	5	6
Yoo Jae-suk (Host)	Main	Main	Main	Main	Main	Main	Main	Main	Main	Main	Main	Main
Kim Sang-ho	Main	Main	Main	Main	Main	Main	Main	Main	Main	Main	Main	Main
Son Dam-bi	Main	Main	Main	Main	Main	Main	Main	Main	Main	Main	Main	Main
Kang Ki-young	Main	Main	Main	Main	Main	Main	Main	Main	Main	Main	Main	Main
Jang Do-yeon	Main	Main	Main	Main	Main	Main	Main	Main	Main	Main	Main	Main
Yang Se-hyung	Main	Main	Main	Main	Main	Main	Main	Main	Main	Main	Main	Main
Im Soo-hyang	Main	Main	Main	Main	Main	Main	Main	Main	Main	Main	Main	Main
Song Kang	Main	Main	Main	Main	Main	Main	Main	Main	Main	Main	Main	Main
Jennie Kim (Blackpink)	Main	Main	Main	Main	Main	Main						
Jeon So-min							Guest	Guest				
Yeonwoo (Momoland)									Guest	Guest		
Son Na-eun (Apink)											Guest	Guest

== List of episodes ==
=== Season 1 ===
Green are the initial hint items acquired and Blue are hint items acquired during playing of games.

Ep. #	Air Date	Hint Items	Money Location	Money Found By	Results
1	November 16, 2018	Hint items available: Cassette tape, Lantern, Remote control, Red hammer, Mug cup, Pen, Magnifying glass & Three pieces of bread: Team Like It's Your Last Time: (Im Soo-hyang) Cassette tape, Magnifying glass, Lantern, Remote control & Red hammer (Kang Ki-young) Red hammer, Magnifying glass & Lantern (Song Kang) Mug cup, Magnifying glass & Lantern (Jennie Kim) Three pieces of bread, Magnifying glass & Lantern; Team We're Crazy: (Son Dam-bi) Lantern & Red hammer (Jang Do-yeon) Pen, Red hammer, Magnifying glass & Remote control (Kim Sang-ho) Remote control, Red hammer & Lantern (Yang Se-hyung) Magnifying glass & Red hammer	Dog Leash of Seolgi	Yang Se-hyung	Im Soo-hyang, Jang Do-yeon, Jennie Kim, Kim Sang-ho, & Song Kang correctly voted for Yang Se-hyung and will receive a bonus hint item next round.
2	November 23, 2018		Dog Leash of Seolgi	Yang Se-hyung	Im Soo-hyang, Jang Do-yeon, Jennie Kim, Kim Sang-ho, & Song Kang correctly voted for Yang Se-hyung and will receive a bonus hint item next round.
3	November 30, 2018	Hint items available: Earphones, Spray bottle, Slingshot, Clipboard, Polaroid, Coin purse, Cellphone & Statue: Team Let's Get It: (Son Dam-bi) Spray bottle, Cellphone & Coin purse (Kim Sang-ho) Statue, Clipboard & Cellphone (Kang Ki-young) Clipboard, Slingshot & Polaroid (Jang Do-yeon) Earphones, Coin purse & Slingshot; Team Large Army: (Yang Se-hyung) Cellphone, Spray bottle & Clipboard (Im Soo-hyang) Earphones, Spray bottle, Cellphone & Slingshot (Song Kang) Polaroid, Slingshot, Cellphone & Coin purse (Jennie Kim) Polaroid, Spray bottle, Cellphone, Earphones, Clipboard, Statue & Coin purse	Spool of thread in the sewing box	Jang Do-yeon	Jang Do-yeon chose to carry the money over to the next round.
4	December 7, 2018		Spool of thread in the sewing box	Jang Do-yeon	Jang Do-yeon chose to carry the money over to the next round.
5	December 14, 2018	Hint items available: Screwdriver, Binoculars, Paperboard, Leather strap, Acetone, Vibrating bell, Piggy bank & Hair dryer: Team Pork Bone Soup: (Son Dam-bi) Binoculars, Paperboard, Piggy bank & Hair dryer (Kang Ki-young) Acetone, Paperboard & Hair dryer (Yang Se-hyung) Piggy bank, Screwdriver & Binoculars (Jennie Kim) Hair dryer, Paperboard & Acetone; Team Dried Squid: (Jang Do-yeon) Vibrating bell, Binoculars, Piggy bank, Paperboard, Screwdriver, Acetone, Hair dryer & Leather strap (Im Soo-hyang) Screwdriver, Binoculars, Vibrating bell, Piggy bank & Paperboard (Song Kang) Piggy bank, Leather strap, Acetone & Paperboard (Kim Sang-ho) Leather strap, Acetone, Screwdriver, Binoculars, Hair dryer & Vibrating bell	Bridge Pillar	Nobody	The players incorrectly voted for Im Soo-hyang. As a result, Jang Do-yeon won the ₩20 million.
6	December 21, 2018		Bridge Pillar	Nobody	The players incorrectly voted for Im Soo-hyang. As a result, Jang Do-yeon won the ₩20 million.

=== Season 2 ===
Green are the initial hint items acquired and Blue are hint items acquired during playing of games.

Ep. #	Air Date	Hint Items	Money Location	Money Hidden By	Money Found By	Results
1	February 15, 2019	Hint items available: Masking tape, Dolphin picture, Music sheet, Batteries, Lottery ticket, Cloth with holes, Wallet & Saw: Team Stir-fried: (Yang Se-hyung) Masking tape, Dolphin picture, Cloth with holes & Music sheet (Kang Ki-young) Dolphin picture, Cloth with holes, Masking tape & Wallet (Son Dam-bi) Music sheet, Cloth with holes, Lottery ticket & Wallet (Jeon So-min) Batteries, Music sheet, Wallet & Saw; Team Webfoot Octopus: (Im Soo-hyang) Lottery ticket, Masking tape & Batteries (Jang Do-yeon) Cloth with holes, Lottery ticket & Dolphin picture (Song Kang) Wallet, Masking tape & Saw (Kim Sang-ho) Saw, Music sheet & Batteries	The crabs in the refrigerator	Kim Sang-ho	Kang Ki-young and Son Dam-bi	Kang Ki-young won ₩5 million as the players only correctly voted for Son Dam-bi. Yang Se-hyung was incorrectly voted for.
2	February 22, 2019		The crabs in the refrigerator	Kim Sang-ho	Kang Ki-young and Son Dam-bi	Kang Ki-young won ₩5 million as the players only correctly voted for Son Dam-bi. Yang Se-hyung was incorrectly voted for.
3	March 1, 2019	Hint items available: Wine Opener, Cellphone, Drawing, Key, Photo, Water bottle, Wooden chopsticks & Pen: Team Tide: (Kang Ki-young) Wine Opener & Photo (Yeonwoo) Cellphone & Key (Song Kang) Drawing & Key (Jang Do-yeon) Key & Cellphone; Team Hungry: (Son Dam-bi) Photo, Water bottle, Wooden chopsticks & Pen (with hidden USB drive) (Yang Se-hyung) Water bottle, Drawing, Wine Opener & Key (Im Soo-hyang) Wooden chopsticks, Water bottle, Wine Opener & Key (Kim Sang-ho) Pen (with hidden USB drive), Wine Opener, Wooden chopsticks & Water bottle	Plush Pig Doll	Yang Se-hyung	Im Soo-hyang and Son Dam-bi	Song Kang, Yang Se-hyung, and Yeonwoo correctly voted for Im Soo-hyang and Son Dam-bi and will receive a bonus hint item next round. Son Na-eun will receive a bonus hint item next round instead as Yeonwoo was unavailable to return.
4	March 8, 2019		Plush Pig Doll	Yang Se-hyung	Im Soo-hyang and Son Dam-bi	Song Kang, Yang Se-hyung, and Yeonwoo correctly voted for Im Soo-hyang and Son Dam-bi and will receive a bonus hint item next round. Son Na-eun will receive a bonus hint item next round instead as Yeonwoo was unavailable to return.
5	March 15, 2019	Hint items available: Subway map, Pills, Hye Ri's map, Cellphone, Letter, Compact Disc, Doll & Jigsaw puzzle: Team Sun Wukong: (Yang Se-hyung) Pills, Subway map, Letter & Doll (Kang Ki-young) Subway map, Pills & Letter (Im Soo-hyang) Letter, Hye Ri's map & Jigsaw puzzle (Son Na-eun) Jigsaw puzzle, Hye Ri's map, Cellphone & Letter; Team Yellow Corvina: (Kim Sang-ho) Hye Ri's map & Letter (Son Dam-bi) Cellphone & Compact Disc (Jang Do-yeon) Compact Disc, Subway map & Doll (Song Kang) Doll, Pills, Compact Disc & Subway map	One of the large tables outside the house	Jang Do-yeon	Kang Ki-young	Everyone correctly voted for Kang Ki-young and the ₩10 million was donated to charity in their names.
6	March 22, 2019		One of the large tables outside the house	Jang Do-yeon	Kang Ki-young	Everyone correctly voted for Kang Ki-young and the ₩10 million was donated to charity in their names.

== Ratings ==
In the tables below, the blue numbers represent the lowest ratings and the red numbers represent the highest ratings.

=== Season 1 ===
Ep.	Broadcast date	AGB Nielsen	
Ep.	Broadcast date	Part 1	Part 2
1	November 16, 2018	3.1%	3.3%
2	November 23, 2018	3.3%	3.3%
3	November 30, 2018	3.4%	3.5%
4	December 7, 2018	2.4%	3.0%
5	December 14, 2018	2.9%	2.9%
6	December 21, 2018	2.5%	2.8%

=== Season 2 ===
Ep.	Broadcast date	AGB Nielsen	
Ep.	Broadcast date	Part 1	Part 2
1	February 15, 2019	3.4%	3.1%
2	February 22, 2019	2.8%	2.7%
3	March 1, 2019	2.8%	2.0%
4	March 8, 2019	3.2%	2.3%
5	March 15, 2019	2.5%	2.5%
6	March 22, 2019	2.1%	2.4%

== Awards and nominations ==
Year	Award	Category	Recipient(s)	Result	Ref.
2018	12th SBS Entertainment Awards	Top Excellence Award (Show/Talk)	Yang Se-hyung	Won	
2018	12th SBS Entertainment Awards	Rookie Award (Female)	Jennie Kim	Nominated	
2018	12th SBS Entertainment Awards	Rookie Award (Male)	Song Kang	Nominated	
2019	13th SBS Entertainment Awards	Honorary Employee Award	Yang Se-hyung	Won	
