= Lee Guk-joo =

South Korean comedian (born 1986)

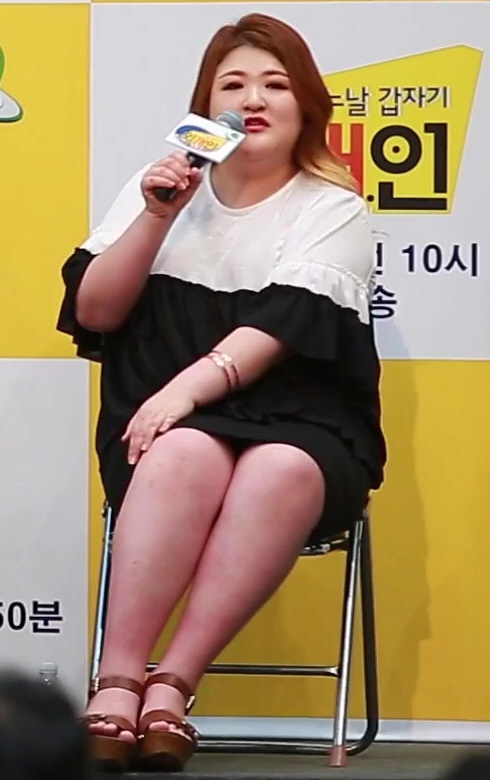
- Lee Guk-joo
- Born: January 5, 1986 (age 40); Myeonmok-dong, Jungnang District, Seoul, South Korea

Comedy career
- Years active: 2006–present
- Medium: Stand-up; Television comedy; Radio DJ; Presenter; Actress
- Genres: Observational; Sketch; Wit; Parody; Slapstick; Dramatic; Sitcom

Korean name
- Hangul: 이국주
- Hanja: 李國主
- RR: I Gukju
- MR: I Kukchu

Lee Guk-joo (Korean: 이국주; born January 5, 1986) is a South Korean comedienne under FNC Entertainment.

== Early life and career ==
Lee made her debut by joining MBC as a 15th generation comedian. She initially signed with CoKo Entertainment, but due to their bankruptcy, she later signed with FNC Entertainment.

== Filmography ==
=== Television series ===
Year	Title	Role
2011-12	Ugly Miss Young-ae	Special appearances/cameos
2014	After School: Lucky or Not	Teenage "It" Girl
2014	A Witch's Love	Misunderstanding woman (cameo)
2014	What Happens to My Family?	Writer (cameo)
2014	Plus Nine Boys	Kang Min-kyung (cameo)
2015	Dream Knight	Biker Chick
2016	Click Your Heart	Nurse

=== Variety shows ===
Year	Title	Role	Notes
2011–present	Comedy Big League	Regular cast	Skit Comedy
2014–2015	Roommate	Regular cast	Season 2
2015	Match Made In Heaven Returns	Special MC	Episode 1–3
2015	One Night Study	Host	Episodes 1–10
2015	I Can See Your Voice	Tone-deaf Detective Team	Episode 10
2015–2016	I Live Alone	Cast member	Episodes 137–183
2016	Vocal War: God's Voice	Fixed panelist	Episodes 3–17
2016	Battle Trip	Contestant with Ahn Young-mi	Episode 13
2016	Hit the Stage	Fixed panelist	Episodes 3–10
2016–2017	We Got Married (Season 4)	Cast member with Untouchable's Sleepy	Episodes 349–372
2016–2017	Secretly Greatly	Co-host	
2017	Battle Trip	Contestant with Park Na-rae	Episodes 63–64
2021	Cooking - The Birth of a Cooking King	Contestant	
2023	For the First Time in Our Lives	Cast Member	

=== Radio show ===
Year	Title	Notes
2014	K.will Youngstreet	Special DJ
2015 – 2018	Lee Guk Joo's Youngstreet	DJ Radio

=== Music video appearances ===
Year	Song title	Artist
2011	"Watch Out"	ZE:A
2014	"Short Hair"	AOA
2014	"Taxi on the Phone"	Kidoh

== Awards and nominations ==
Year	Award	Category	Nominated work	Result
2007	MBC Entertainment Awards	Best Female Newcomer in a Sitcom or Comedy		Won
2014	SBS Entertainment Awards	New Star Award	Roommate: Season 2, Entertainment News	Won
2015	51st Baeksang Arts Awards	Best Variety Performer – Female	Roommate: Season 2, Comedy Big League	Won
2015	SBS Entertainment Awards	Radio DJ Power FM awards	Lee Guk Joo's Youngstreet	Won
2016	MBC Entertainment Awards	High Excellence Award	I Live Alone, We Got Married	Won
2016	MBC Entertainment Awards	Best Couple Award (paired with Sleepy)	We Got Married	Nominated
2016	tvN10 Awards	Best Comedienne	Comedy Big League	Nominated
2022	2022 MBC Entertainment Awards	Excellence Award, Variety Category - Female	Omniscient Interfering View	Won
