= Park Na-rae =

South Korean comedian (born 1985)

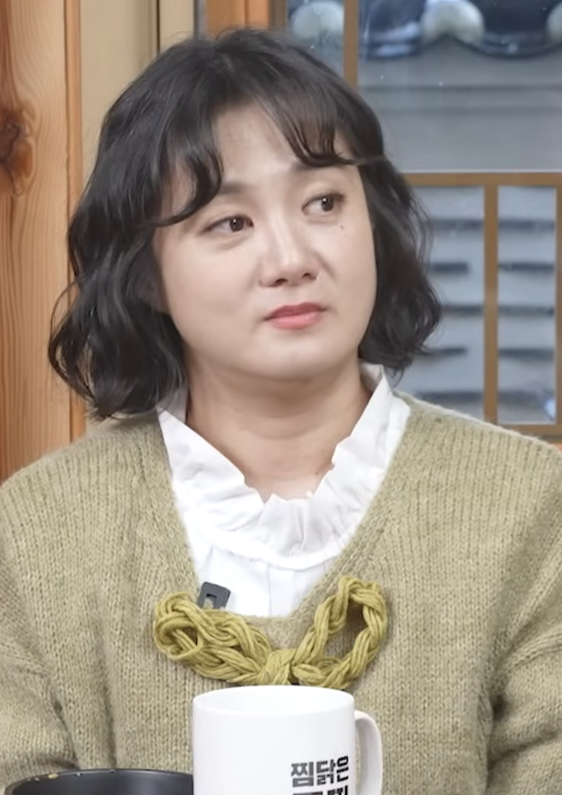
- Park in December 2024
- Born: October 25, 1985 (age 40); Mokpo, South Korea

Comedy career
- Years active: 2006–present
- Medium: Stand-up; Television comedy
- Genres: Observational; Sketch; Wit; Parody; Slapstick; Dramatic; Sitcom

Korean name
- Hangul: 박나래
- Hanja: 朴娜勑
- RR: Bak Narae
- MR: Pak Narae

Park Na-rae (Korean: 박나래; born on October 25, 1985) is a South Korean comedian.

== Early life and education ==
As a teenager, Park attended Anyang Arts High School. After successfully graduating from Anyang Arts High School, she went on to study at Sangmyung University.

== Career ==
In 2006, Park made her debut on Gag Concert as a comedienne, after successfully auditioning for the 21st class of comedians.

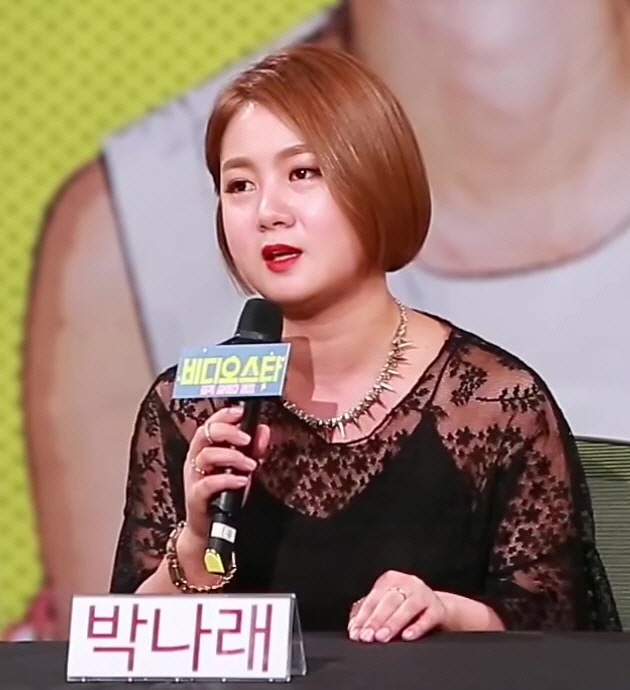
Park in 2014

In 2015, she signed to JDB Entertainment.

In 2018, Park published a book titled Welcome to Narae Bar. In the same year, she was voted as the runner-up for the Comedian of the Year Award.

In 2019, Park released a Netflix stand-up comedy special called Park Na-rae: Glamour Warning, making her the first Korean female comedian to do so. Park also hosted that year's SBS Entertainment Awards alongside co-hosts, Kim Seong-joo and Jo Jeong-sik.

Park was invited to take part in the Netflix Is A Joke Fest, taking place from April 27, 2020 through May 3, 2020 at The Wiltern Theatre in Koreatown.

On September 20, 2024, Park's contract with JDB Entertainment ended.

== Personal life ==
Park has an interest in bartending, and has always included a private bar in the design of her homes, calling it Narae Bar. In addition to her career as a comedian, she is also a DJ.

In 2018, ahead of the South Korean local elections and the South Korean by-elections, Park took part in the 613 Vote and Laugh (Korean: 613 투표하고 웃자) campaign, together with other comedians such as Yoo Jae-seok, Kang Ho-dong, and Shin Dong-yup, encouraging the South Korean public to use their vote in the elections.

On August 11, 2022, Park donated ₩10 million to help those affected by the 2022 South Korean floods through the Hope Bridge Korea Disaster Relief Association.

In December 2025, Park became involved in a legal dispute after her former managers announced plans to file a lawsuit, alleging workplace harassment and seeking damages, while Park stated that she was reviewing the claims through her legal representatives. Also she became embroiled in controversy over alleged illegal medical practices after claims emerged that she had received intravenous drips and other medical treatments from an unlicensed individual. The matter was included in a police investigation, and Park’s side stated that they were reviewing the facts and would respond in accordance with legal procedures. In the aftermath of the controversy, Park temporarily suspended her broadcasting activities.

The same month, outlets reported that she had worked for more than a year through And Park (주식회사 앤파크), a company her mother set up in 2018, without popular-culture planning-business registration. They described that as an alleged breach of the Popular Culture and Arts Industry Development Act, which can carry up to two years' imprisonment or a ₩20 million fine, and said the firm was listed for services and event work and had allegedly functioned as her one-person agency after her exclusive contract with JDB Entertainment ended in September 2024. Representatives said registration had been applied for and was pending, and that a statement would come through counsel. In January 2026 they added that the only staff member on the books was her mother as chief executive, that a complaint over the suspected missing registration was pending, and that an application was still intended.

== Filmography ==
=== Television series ===
Year	Title	Role	Notes	Ref.
2014	Plus Nine Boys	Comedian	Cameo	
2014	Modern Farmer		Special appearance/cameo	
2015	Misaengmul	Shin Da-eun	Supporting character	
2016	The Sound of Your Heart	Park Na-rae	Special appearance/cameo	
2017	The Rebel		Special appearance/cameo	
2018	What's Wrong with Secretary Kim	Devil on Lee Young-joon's shoulder	Voice	

=== Television shows ===
Year	Title	Role	Notes	Ref.
2006–2012	Gag Concert	Cast member		
2012–present	Comedy Big League	Cast member	Season 3, 4, 5	
2015	My Little Television	Cast member	with Jang Do-yeon (Episode 27–28)	
2015	I Can See Your Voice		Tone-deaf Detective Team (Episode 3)	
2015–2016	Same Bed, Different Dreams	Panelist	Episode 27, 29, 45	
2015–2016	Vitamin	Fixed panelist	Episode 606–626	
2016	Hit the Stage	Panelist	Episode 1–10	
2016	Singing Battle – Victory	Contestant	on Team Kangta (2nd game) and Team Jo Gyu-chan (3rd game) (Episode 2–5)	
2016–2021	Video Star	Co-host	with Kim Sook, Park So-hyun and Sandara Park	
2017	Battle Trip	Contestant	with Jang Do-yeon (Episode 35–36)	
2017	Battle Trip	Contestant	with Lee Guk-joo (Episode 63–64)	
2017	Oppa Thinking	Intern	Episode 7	
2017–present	I Live Alone	Cast member	Episode 174–present	
2017–2019	Salty Tour	Cast member	Episode 1–69	
2018	Two Yoo Project Sugar Man	Team member	on Team Yoo Hee-yeol (Season 2, Episode 1–19)	
2018	Can Love Be Translated?	Panelist		
2018	Cook Everything School	Cast member		
2018	My Mad Beauty 2	Host	Season 2	
2018–present	DoReMi Market	Cast member	Episode 1–present	
2018–present	Sound of Grazing Grass	Cast member		
2018–present	Taste of Dating	Host		
2019–present	My Mad Beauty 3	Host	Season 3	
2019	The Ranksters	Cast member	Anything Friends	
2019	Little Forest	Cast member		
2019	Tell Me	Cast member		
2020	League-of-love Coaching	Cast member	with Jang Do-yeon (Episode 1–11)	
2020	Gamsung Camping	Cast member	with Park So-dam, Ahn Young-mi, Son Na-eun, Solar (Episode 1–present)	
2020–2021	The House Detox	Host	with Shin Ae-ra, Yoon Kyun-sang (Episode 1–50)	
2021	Seol Vival	Host	with Hwang Bo-ra and Kim Ji-min	
2021–present	Late Night Ghost Talk	MC	with Kim Sook and Shin Dong-yup	
2021	Long-established Trade Secret	MC	with Park Chan-il	
2022	Restaurant Standing in Line	Host		
2022	World Dark Tour	Host		
2023	Walking Into the Fantastic	Host	with Kyuhyun	
2023	Miss Wife	Host	MBC Lunar New Year	
2023–present	Saturday Meals Love	Cast Member		
2023	Empty Nesters - Suri Suri Village Suri	Host	Season 3	

=== Web shows ===
Year	Title	Role	Ref.
2019	Park Na-rae: Glamour Warning	Host	
2021	From the New World	Cast Member	
2022	Carbon Zero, I'll Eat Well	Narrator	
2023	Zombie Verse	Cast Member	

=== Music video appearances ===
Year	Title	Singer
2014	"You're So Fly"	BtoB
2019	"Silent Movie"	Yubin, Yoon Mirae

== Awards and nominations ==
Year	Award	Category	Nominated work	Result	Ref.
2006	5th KBS Entertainment Awards	Best Newcomer Award for Comedy	Gag Concert, Comedy Club 2	Nominated	
2007	6th KBS Entertainment Awards	Best Newcomer Award for Comedy	Gag Concert, Comedy Club 2	Nominated	
2015	MBC Entertainment Awards	Best Newcomer Award for Music / Talk Show		Won	
2015	23rd Korean Culture and Entertainment Awards	Comedian Award		Won	
2016	52nd Baeksang Arts Awards	Best Variety Performer - Female	Comedy Big League	Nominated	
2016	MBC Entertainment Awards	Excellence Award in Variety Show - Female	I Live Alone, We Got Married Season 4	Won	
2016	tvN10 Awards	Best Comedienne	Comedy Big League	Nominated	
2016	tvN10 Awards	Made in tvN, Actress in Variety	Comedy Big League	Nominated	
2017	53rd Baeksang Arts Awards	Best Variety Performer – Female	I Live Alone	Won	
2017	2017 MBC Entertainment Awards	Top Excellence Award in Variety - Female	I Live Alone	Won	
2017	2017 MBC Entertainment Awards	Best Couple Award (with Kian84)	I Live Alone	Won	
2017	2017 MBC Entertainment Awards	Grand Prize (Daesang)	I Live Alone	Nominated	
2017	2017 SBS Entertainment Awards	Mobile Icon Award	Copy and Paste Show	Won	
2018	54th Baeksang Arts Awards	Best Variety Performer – Female	I Live Alone	Nominated	
2018	45th Korean Broadcasting Awards	Comedian Award	I Live Alone	Won	
2018	24th Korean Popular Culture & Arts Awards	Minister of Culture, Sports and Tourism's Commendation	—N/a	Won	
2018	2018 MBC Entertainment Awards	Grand Prize (Daesang)	I Live Alone	Nominated	
2018	2018 MBC Entertainment Awards	Entertainer of the Year	I Live Alone	Won	
2018	2018 MBC Entertainment Awards	Best Couple Award (with Kian84)	I Live Alone	Nominated	
2018	2018 MBC Entertainment Awards	Best Couple Award (with Kim Choong-jae)	I Live Alone	Nominated	
2019	2019 SBS Entertainment Awards	SNS Star Award	Little Forest	Won	
2019	2019 MBC Entertainment Awards	Grand Prize (Daesang)	I Live Alone	Won	
2020	56th Baeksang Arts Awards	Best Variety Performer – Female	I Live Alone	Won	
2020	14th SBS Entertainment Awards	Hot Star Award – TV Category	Park Jang's LOL	Won	
2020	18th KBS Entertainment Awards	Top Excellence Award in Show/Variety Category	Stand Up	Nominated	
2020	20th MBC Entertainment Awards	Grand Prize (Daesang)	I Live Alone	Nominated	
2020	20th MBC Entertainment Awards	Digital Content Awards with Hwasa and Han Hye-jin	I Live Alone	Won	
2021	21st MBC Entertainment Awards	Entertainer of the Year	I Live Alone, Late Night Ghost Talk	Won	
2022	22nd MBC Entertainment Awards	Entertainer of the Year	I Live Alone, Late Night Ghost Talk	Won	
2022	22nd MBC Entertainment Awards	Best Couple Award with Lee Jang-woo and Jun Hyun-moo	I Live Alone	Won	
2023	23rd MBC Entertainment Awards	Top Excellence Award (Female Category)	I Live Alone, Save Me, Holmes!	Won	
2023	23rd MBC Entertainment Awards	Best Teamwork Award with Lee Jang-woo and Jun Hyun-moo	I Live Alone	Won	

=== Listicles ===
Name of publisher, year listed, name of listicle, and placement
Publisher	Year	Listicle	Placement	Ref.
Forbes	2019	Korea Power Celebrity	6th	
Forbes	2020	Korea Power Celebrity	7th	
