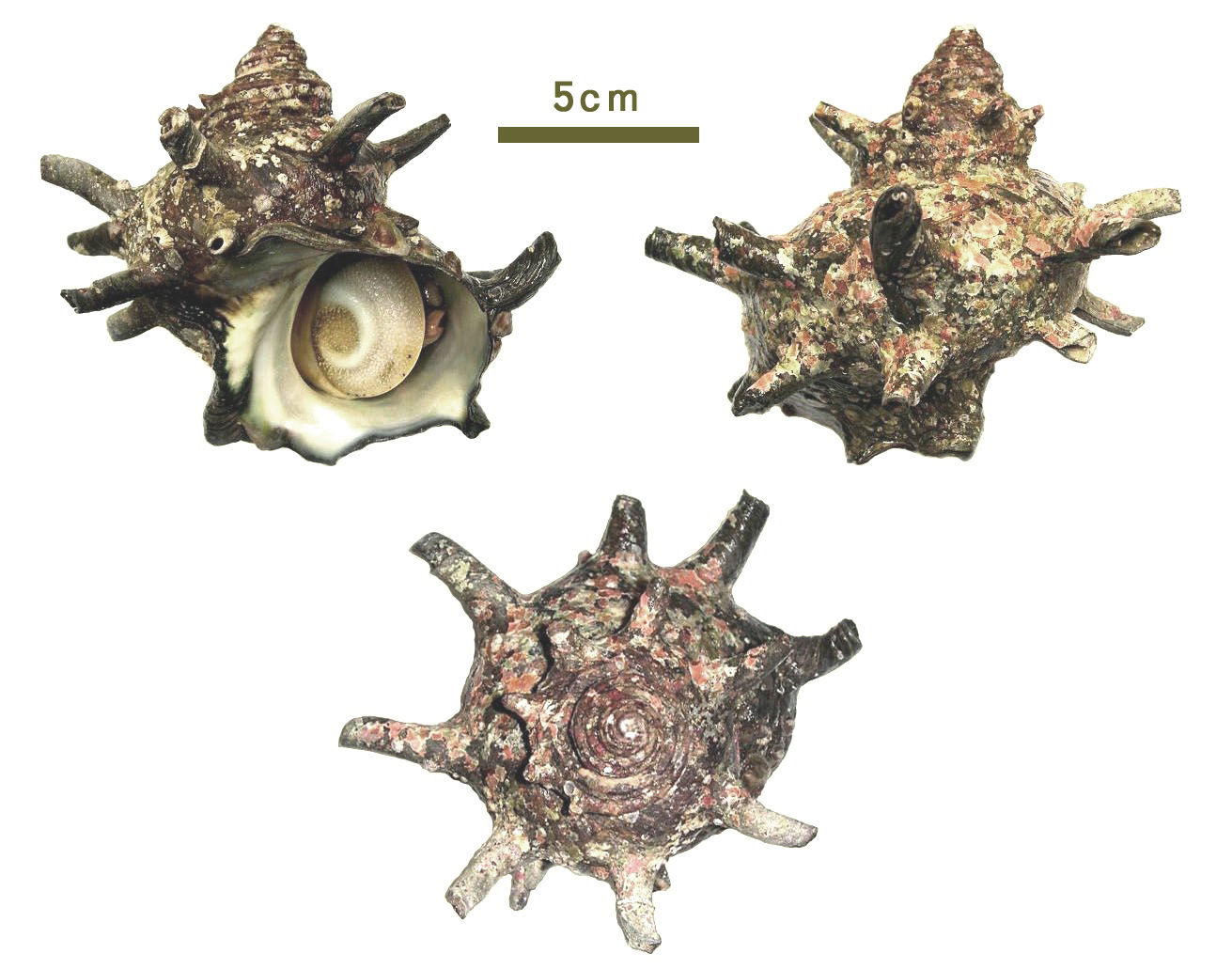

Scientific classification
- Kingdom: Animalia
- Phylum: Mollusca
- Class: Gastropoda
- Subclass: Vetigastropoda
- Order: Trochida
- Superfamily: Trochoidea
- Family: Turbinidae
- Genus: Turbo
- Species: T. sazae

Binomial name
- Turbo sazae Fukuda, 2017

Synonyms
- Turbo (Batillus) sazae Fukuda, 2017

= Turbo sazae =

Species of gastropod

Turbo sazae, also known by its Japanese name sazae (サザエ), is a species of sea snail, a marine gastropod mollusk, in the family Turbinidae, the turban snails. Despite being commonly eaten in Japan, it had long been confused with Turbo cornutus and with Turbo japonicus before Fukuda (2017) pointed it out.

== Distribution ==
This species occurs in South Korea and Japan.

== Culinary Use ==
Sazae is enjoyed as a delicacy in Japan. After cooking, the corkscrew-like mollusk can be drawn out of its shell using its hard operculum, or hard, rocky lid, to which it is firmly attached. The operculum is not edible, and must be discarded along with the animal's shell after eating.

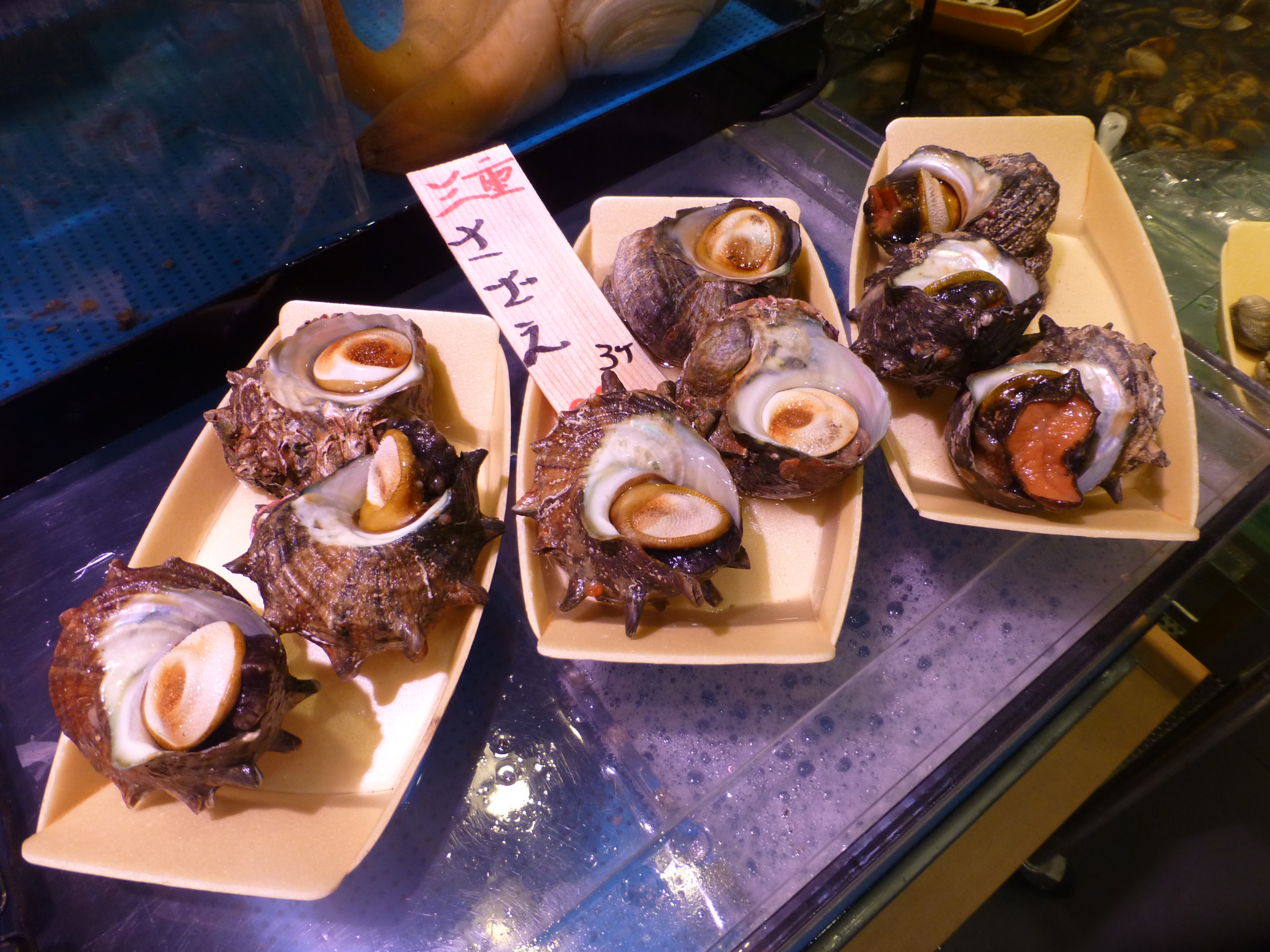

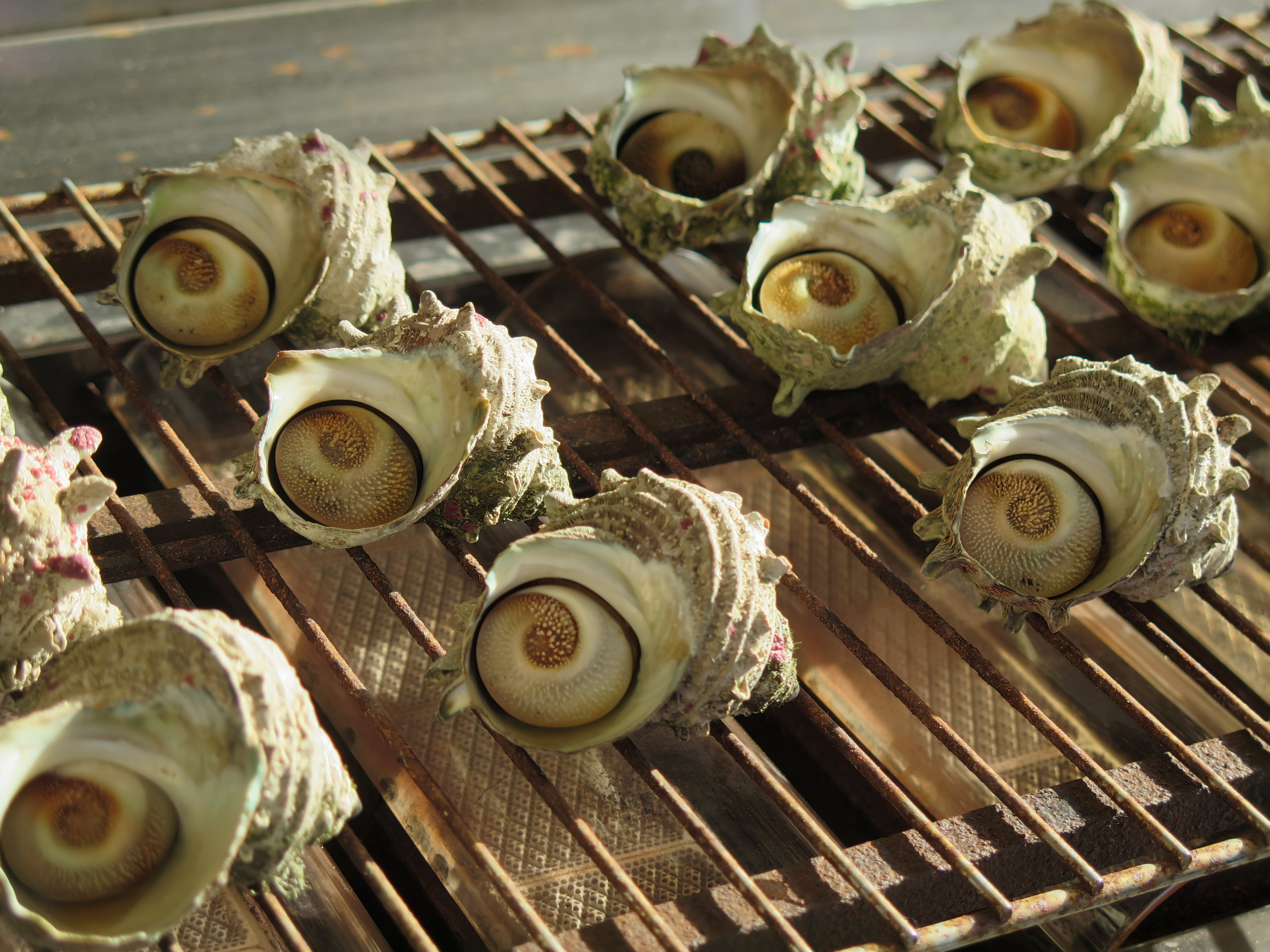
