= Jang Young-ran =

South Korean entertainer (born 1979)

- Born: September 19, 1979 (age 47)
- Origin: Seoul, South Korea
- Occupations: VJ; entertainer; actress
- Years active: 2003–present
- Label: SM C&C
- Spouse: Unknown (m. 2009)

- Jang Young-ran
- Hangul: 장영란
- Hanja: 張瑛蘭
- RR: Jang Yeongran
- MR: Chang Yŏngnan

Jang Young-ran (Korean: 장영란; born September 19, 1979) is a South Korean actress and trot singer. Debuted in 2003, she is one of the VJs in Mnet Korea. She also participates in a variety of Korean talk shows. In May 2009, she released her debut single "The Mask" under the name "Rani". The change of her career direction was to give the audiences a new concept of her real self and hopes to relieve herself from her unpopular image she had built up from TV show appearances. In May 2024, Jang signed with new agency SM C&C.

== Personal life ==
Jang married her husband, an oriental doctor, in 2009 and has two children.

In June 2022, Jang announced her third child. Later on July, Jang made the announcement via Instagram that she had a third miscarriage.

== Career ==
=== Album ===
- 2009 The Mask (라니)

=== Drama ===
- 2008: Our Home (SBS)
- 2007: In-soon Is Pretty (KBS)
- 2007: Hello! Miss (KBS)
- 2005: Marrying a Millionaire (SBS)

=== Film ===
- 2007: Donggabnaegi Extracurricular Lesson 2

=== Television appearances ===
- 2015: Srange Bedfellows
- 2008: The Great Wall:Love of the Night
- 2008: Star Golden Bell
- 2005: Real time Saturday|Love Letter
- 2003: TV entertainment Night
- 2003: PHONE 2 FUN
- Ongamenet Game Journalist
- 2021 : Woman Plus - Host
- 2021 : Money Touch Me - Host
- 2021 : Pleasant Counseling Center - Host
- 2022: The Grievous Couple - Host
- 2022: Will the breakup be a recall? - Host with Yang Se-hyung
- 2022 : Omniscient Interfering View - Assembly
- 2022: Attack on Sisters; Host with Park Mi-sun

=== Musicals ===
- 2006: Scissors Family

=== Radio ===
- 2008: Jang Youngran's Sensitivity Club
