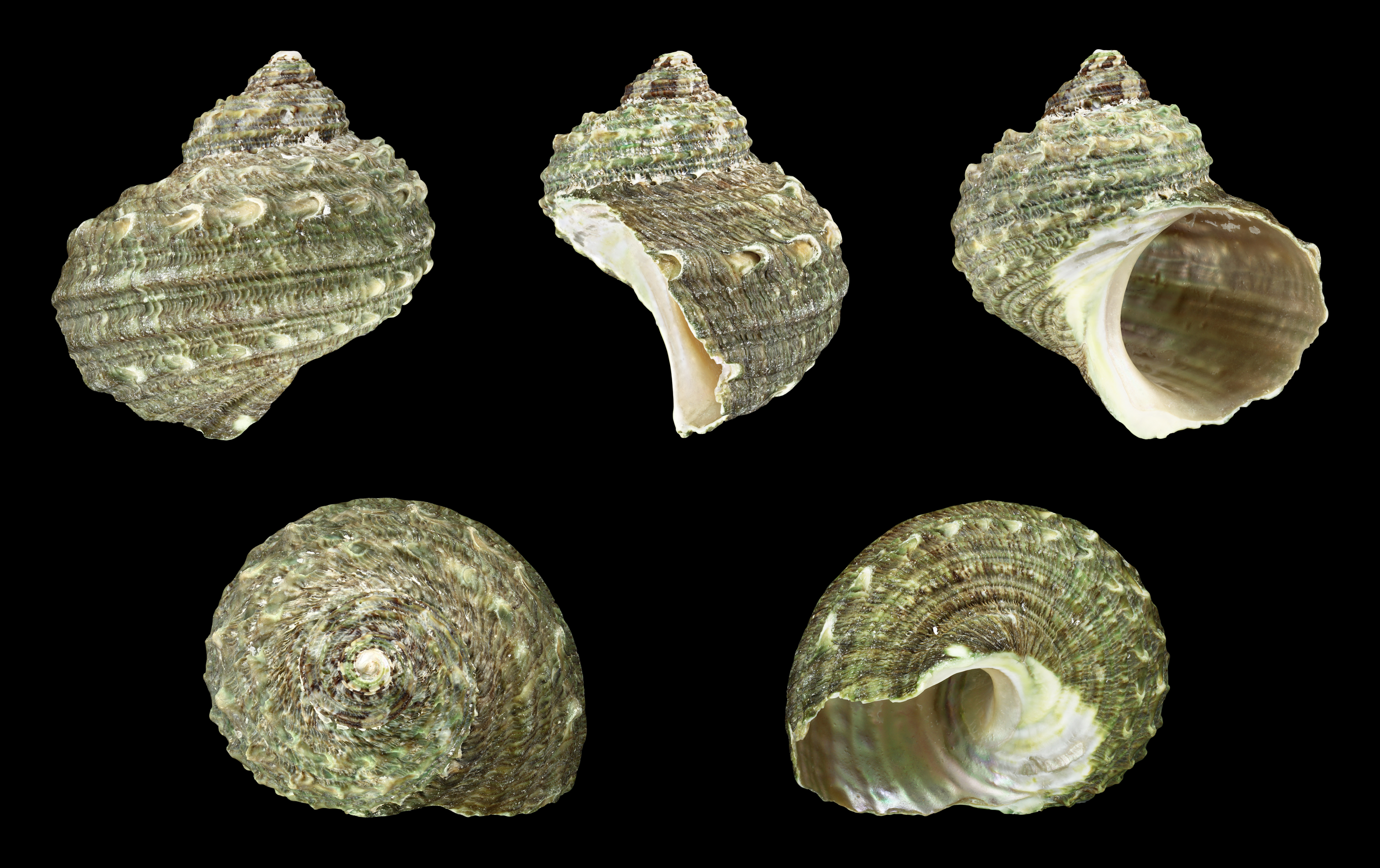

Scientific classification
- Kingdom: Animalia
- Phylum: Mollusca
- Class: Gastropoda
- Subclass: Vetigastropoda
- Order: Trochida
- Superfamily: Trochoidea
- Family: Turbinidae
- Genus: Turbo
- Species: T. cornutus

Binomial name
- Turbo cornutus Lightfoot, 1786

Synonyms
- Batillus cornutus ([Lightfoot], 1786); Ocellatopoma japonica Habe, T. MS; Turbo (Batillus) chinensis Ozawa & Tomida, 1995; Turbo (Batillus) cornutus Lightfoot, 1786; Turbo brachiatus Perry, G., 1811; Turbo chinensis Ozawa & Tomida, 1995; Turbo cornutus chinensis Ozawa & Tomida, 1995 ·; Turbo cornutus cornutus Lightfoot, 1786; Turbo siamea Röding, 1798

= Turbo cornutus =

Species of gastropod

Turbo cornutus, common name the horned turban, is a species of sea snail, marine gastropod mollusk in the family Turbinidae.

== Description ==
The scientific name Turbo cornutus, literally means "horned turban," and it is characterized by a hard, ventricose, spiny, imperforate shell of which the length varies between 65 and 120 mm (2 1/2 and 4 3/4 in). It has a large, thick, green-gray shell with irregular incremental striae and spiral lirae. The shell has about 5–6 whorls, which turn clockwise and have horny protuberances. The body whorl is ventricose, somewhat bicarinate, armed about the middle with two spiral series of erect tubular spines, and frequently a smaller accessory row above. The lower series of spines is sometimes absent. The thickness and shape of the shell and the horns vary greatly according to environmental conditions. The sutures are deeply impressed. The oblique aperture is rounded and is about 3.5 cm (1 3/8 in) in diameter, and is green or red-brown. The thin inside lip of the shell is not smooth, but rough and granular. The broad columella is flattened and somewhat grooved, produced and channelled at its base.

Turbo cornutus develops an operculum, which is calcareous, concave and brown within. It contains four whorls. The nucleus measures one-third the distance across the face. The operculum itself bears a deep, spiral groove and is also granular on the convex outer surface. This outer surface is white or tinged with brown and olive, more or less sharply asperate with elevated points, and with a spiral rib commencing in an axial elevation and terminating at the margin of increment. When separated from the attached animal, the inner side of the operculum is flat, with a somewhat smooth spiral.

Due to an anatomical quirk of growth of gastropods, the anus is located on its head. As marine snails, they breathe through gills.

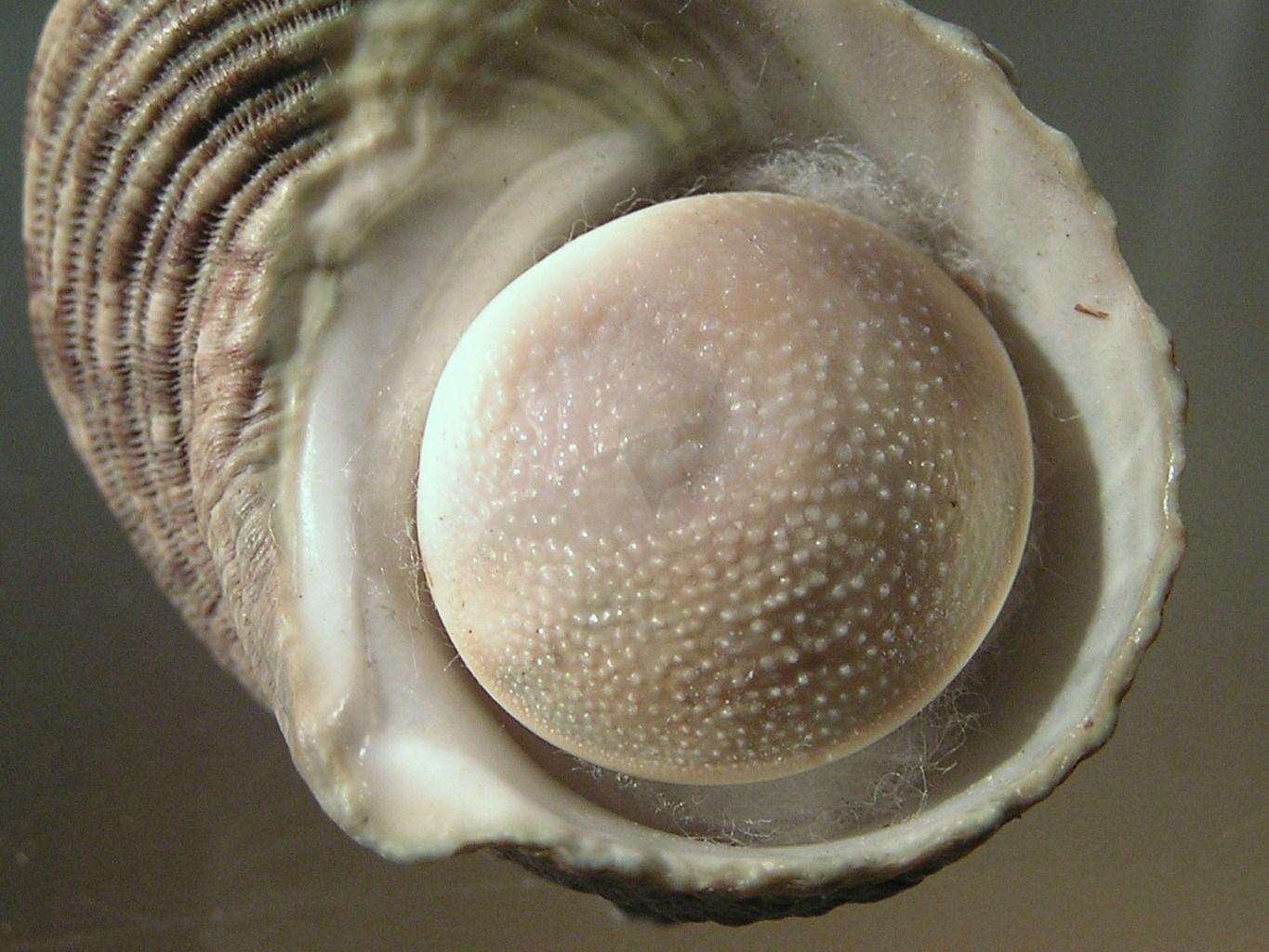
aperture and operculum

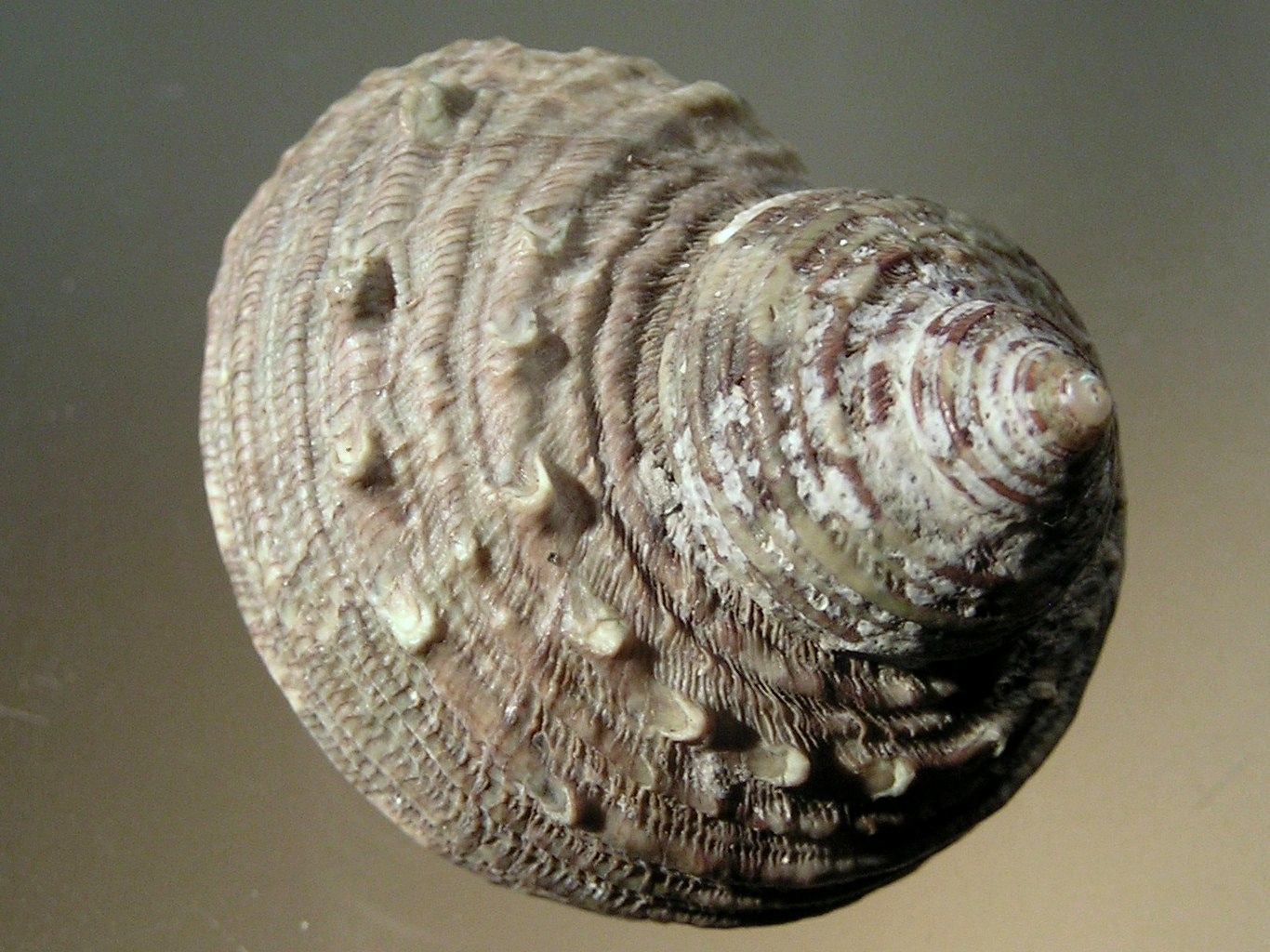
top view

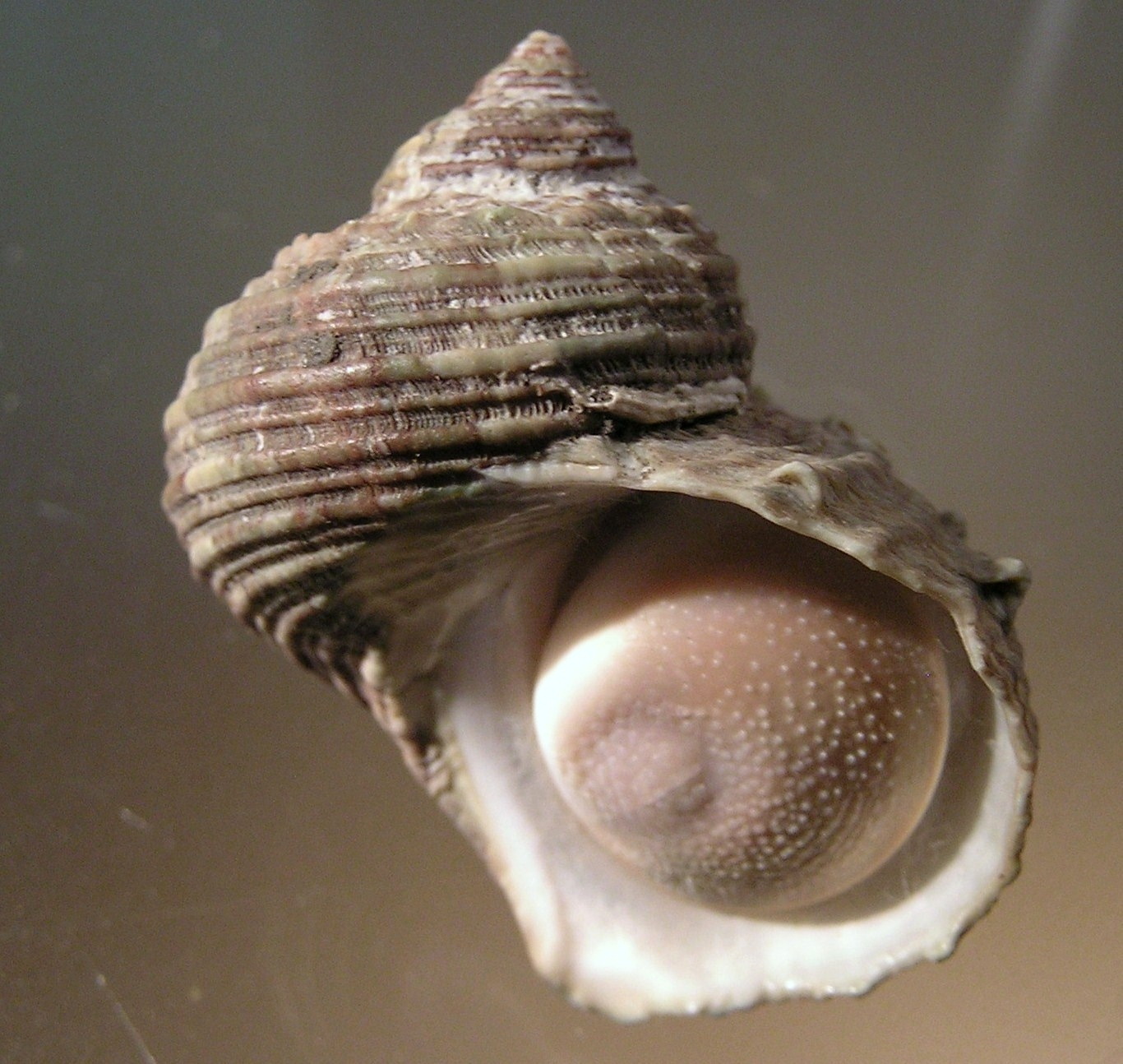
apertural view

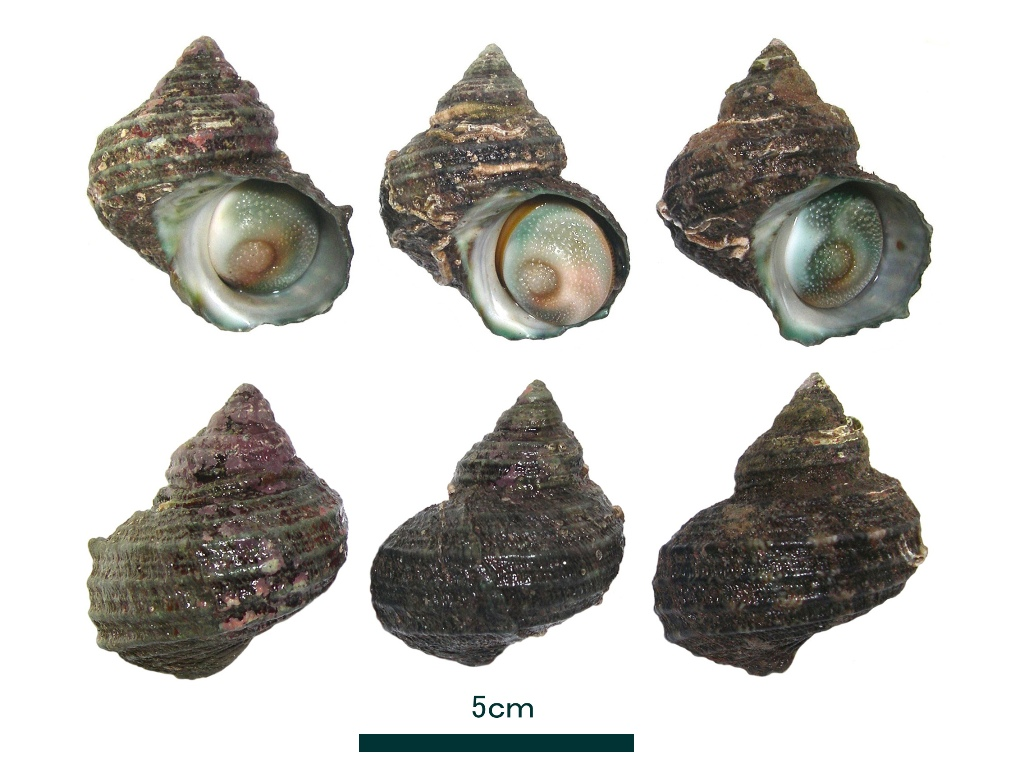
Six live but retracted individuals of Turbo cornutus, with the operculum showing in three of them

== Distribution ==
This marine species occurs off the Mascarene Basin, the Philippines, Jeju Island, and China.

According to Fukuda 2017, Turbo cornutus should be restricted to the species endemic to southern China and Taiwan. The species in Japan is Turbo sazae.

== Habitat and reproduction ==
Turbo cornutus can be found in relatively shallow coastal waters (up to 30 meters deep). It can be found around China. It feeds on various kinds of algae. Young horned turban shells eat red-turf algae, while adults eat larger seaweed.

Turbo cornutus spawns from August to September, although the gonads begin to mature from May. Larvae have a very short period as free-floating plankton at approximately five days, after which they settle and begin to develop a shell. The planktonic and early shell-growing stages are highly dangerous times for young horned turban shells, and they are eaten in large numbers.
