= Lee Se-young (comedian) =

South Korean comedian and actress (born 1989)

Lee Se-Young
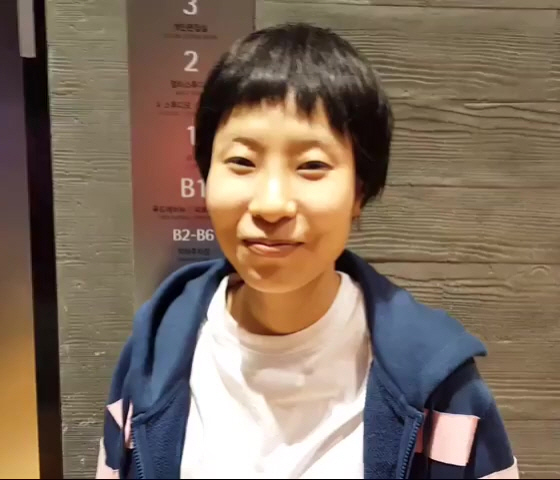
- Lee in 2016
- Born: April 28, 1989 (age 37); Incheon, South Korea

Comedy career
- Years active: 2011–present
- Medium: Stand-up; Television comedy
- Genres: Observational; Sketch; Wit; Parody; Slapstick; Dramatic; Sitcom

- Lee Se-young
- Hangul: 이세영
- RR: I Seyeong
- MR: I Seyŏng

Lee Se-Young (Korean: 이세영; born April 28, 1989) is a South Korean comedian and actress. She is best known as a host on the tvN's entertainment show SNL Korea.

== Personal life ==
Lee intends to wed her non-celebrity, Korean-Japanese lover. They anticipate getting married in January 2022.

== Filmography ==
=== Television shows ===
Year	Title	Role	Ref.
2022	Dog-Daughter-in-law	Cast Member	
2018	What's Wrong with Secretary Kim	cameo	
2015	Reply 1988	Wang Ja-hyun	
