= Jang Yoon-jeong (singer) =

South Korean trot singer (born 1980)

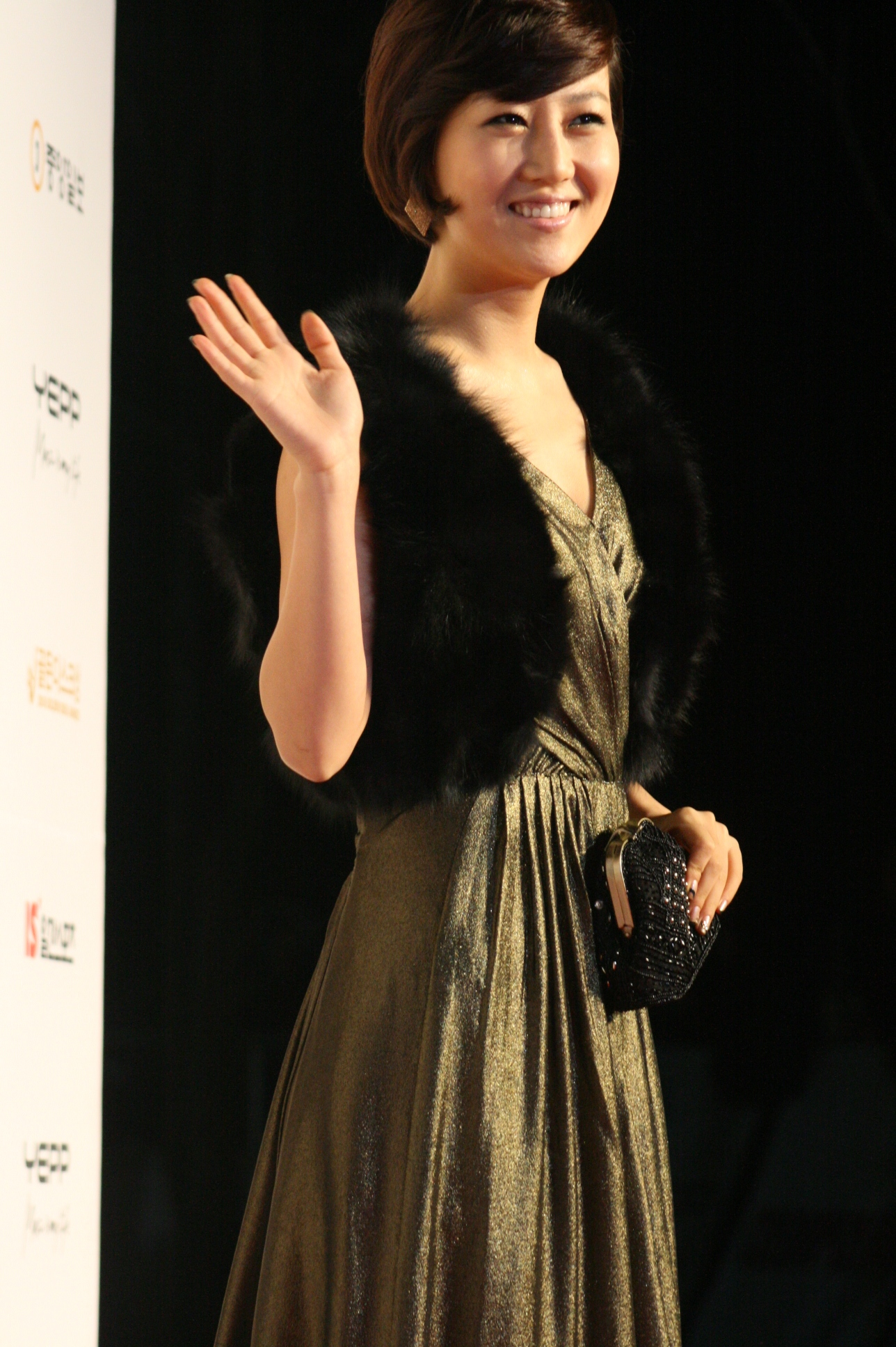
- Jang at the Golden Disk Awards 2008

Background information
- Born: February 16, 1980 (age 46); Chungju, South Korea
- Genre: Trot
- Occupations: Singer; MC
- Years active: 1999–present
- Labels: IOK Company; Bliss Entertainment
- Spouse: Do Kyung-wan (m. 2013)

Korean name
- Hangul: 장윤정
- Hanja: 張允瀞
- RR: Jang Yunjeong
- MR: Chang Yunjŏng

Jang Yoon-jeong (Korean: 장윤정, born February 16, 1980) is a South Korean trot singer, commonly referred to as "The Queen of Trot". Jang debuted in 1999 and became well-known in 2004 when her single "Eomeona!" ("Oh My Goodness!") topped the charts. The song is often credited with helping re-popularize trot music in South Korea. In 2017, a Gallup poll found that Jang was the third-most popular singer in the country. She often appears on the KBS 1TV Golden Oldies, as well as other singing programmes.

== Career ==
In April 2005, Jang debuted in Japan with the release of "Oh, My Goodness".

On April 5, she became new MC of KBS program Escaping Danger Number One. Her interview was spilled before the broadcast of Healing Camp, Aren't You Happy.

In August 2014, Jang signed with agency KOEN Stars, home to MCs Lee Hwi-jae and Lee Kyung-kyu, after her former agency Inwoo Production closed down.

== Personal life ==
On June 29, 2013, Jang married news announcer Do Kyung-wan in Yeouido, Western Seoul. The couple welcomed son Yeon-woo on June 13, 2014, and later daughter Ha-young on November 8, 2018. From 2019 to 2022, the family was featured on popular reality series The Return of Superman.

== Philanthropy ==
On her birthday in February 2023, Jang donated 100 million won to families of vulnerable children with disabilities.

== Discography ==
=== Studio albums ===
List of studio albums, with selected chart positions and sales
Title	Album details	Peak chart positions		Sales
Title	Album details	KOR RIAK	KOR Gaon	Sales
Eomeona! (어머나!)	Released: October 22, 2004; Label: Inwoo Production; Formats: CD, cassette	8	—N/a	KOR: 51,826
Jjanjjara (짠짜라)	Released: May 10, 2005; Label: Inwoo Production; Formats: CD, cassette	8	—N/a	KOR: 91,946
Later, Later (이따, 이따요)	Released: September 28, 2006; Label: Inwoo Production; Formats: CD, cassette	—	—N/a	
Twist (트위스트)	Released: June 27, 2008; Label: Inwoo Production; Formats: CD, cassette	8	—N/a	KOR: 11,101
Come (올래)	Released: June 8, 2010; Label: Inwoo Production; Formats: CD, digital download	—N/a	4	KOR: 1,782
10th Anniversary (10주년 앨범)	Released: October 17, 2012; Label: Inwoo Production; Formats: CD, digital download	—N/a	—	
Girl (女子)	Released: April 22, 2015; Label: Koen Stage; Formats: CD, digital download	—N/a	—	
Préparation	Released: March 12, 2019; Label: IOK Company; Formats: CD, digital download	—N/a	—	
estrena	Released: April 19, 2022; Label: SKY E&M; Formats: CD, digital download	—N/a	—	

=== Compilation albums ===
List of compilation albums, with selected chart positions and sales
Title	Album details	Peak chart positions	Sales
Title	Album details	KOR Gaon	Sales
The Encore!	Released: September 14, 2007; Label: Manwoldang; Formats: CD, digital download	30	KOR: 4,958
Best 2020	Released: September 29, 2020; Label: 2% Entertainment; Formats: LP, digital download	35	

=== Soundtrack appearances ===
Title	Year	Peak chart positions		TV series
Title	Year	KOR Gaon	KOR Hot 100	TV series
"Promise" (약속)	2007	—	—	Lee San, Wind of the Palace OST
"Aewolrang"	2010	—	—	Dong Yi OST Part 3
"Oh Happy" (살만합니다)	2016	—	—	Blow Breeze OST Part 4
"One Tree" (나 홀로 나무) (with 나무)	2017	—	—	—N/a
"Playing with Fire" (불장난)	2017	—	—	Band of Sisters OST Part 4
"—" denotes releases that did not chart or were not released in that region.

== Filmography ==
=== Television series ===
Year	Title	Role	Notes	Ref.
2004	The Clinic for Married Couples: Love and War			
2005	Nonstop 5		Cameo	
2016	Entertainer	Dj radio show	Cameo	

=== Television shows ===
Year	Title	Role	Notes	Ref.
2006–2007	1000 Song Challenge	Host		
2009–2014	1000 Song Challenge	Host		
2009–2012	Top 10 music shows nationwide	Host		
2013–2014	Crisis Escape No. 1	Host		
2014	100 People, 100 Songs	Host		
2016	Global Husband White Paper My Side, Husband	Host	Episode 1–28	
2016–2017	Star Show Wonderful Day	Host	with Kim Gu-ra	
2016–present	I Like Songs	Host		
2017–2018	Jang star show	Host		
2017	Fantastic Duo Season 2	Panelist		
2018	The Return of Superman	Narrator	Episode 234–249	
2019	Miss Trot	Master		
2019	Super Hearer	Hearer		
2020	Travelling Market	Cast		
2020	Favorite Entertainment	Main Host (CEO)		
2020	K-Trot in Town	Cast Member		
2020–2022	Mr Trot	Master	Season 1–2	
2020–2021	Miss Trot 2	Master		
2021	Mysterious Record Shop	Host	Episode 1–10	
2021	Comfortable Café	Host	Episode 1–8	
2021	Wasup K-Grandma	Host	with Jang Do-yeon	
2021	Comfortable Café 2	Host	Episode 1–8	
2021	Lanson Marketplace	Host		
2021	Jang Yun-jeong's Seal Breaking	Main Cast	with Do Kyung-wan	
2021	The Grasshopper Playing with Ants	Cast Member		
2021–2022	Liberation Town	Host	Episode 1–34	
2022	Jang Yun-jeong's Seal Breaking	Main Cast	Season 2	
2022	Again, Sister	Host		
2022	Boss in the Mirror	Boss		
2022	Rather good	Host	with Lee Chan-won	
2022–present	Dads from across the water	Host	with In Gyo-jin and Kim Na-young	
2023	Couple Athlete's Village	Host	with Do Kyung-wan	

=== Web shows ===
Year	Title	Role	Notes	Ref.
2022	Jang Yun-jeong's Wine Bar	Host	YouTube KBS	

== Accolades ==
=== Awards and nominations ===
Name of the award ceremony, year presented, category, nominee of the award, and the result of the nomination
Award ceremony	Year	Category	Nominee / Work	Result	Ref.
APAN Music Awards	2021	Best Solo – Female (Global)	Jang Yoon-jeong	Nominated	
Brand Consumer Loyalty Awards	2020	Best Couple Award	Jang Yoon-jeong (with Do Kyung-Wan)	Won	
Cheongju Broadcasting	2004	ranked 1st the nation's top 10 songs	Oh, My Goodness	Won	
Golden Disc Awards	2005	Trot Award	"Really!" (짠짜라)	Won	
Golden Disc Awards	2006	Trot Award	"Later, Later" (이따 이따요)	Won	
Golden Disc Awards	2007	Trot Award	"First Love" (첫사랑)	Won	
Golden Disc Awards	2008	Trot Award	"Jang Yoon-jeong Twist" (장윤정 트위스트)	Won	
KBS Entertainment Awards	2019	Best Couple Award	Jang Yoo-jeong with Do Kyung-wan; I Like Songs, The Return of Superman	Nominated	
KBS Entertainment Awards	2020	Top Excellence Award in Show/Variety Category	I Like Songs, The Return of Superman	Nominated	
KBS Entertainment Awards	2021	Top Excellence Award in Show/Variety Category	I Like to Sing, LAN Marketplace, The Return of Superman	Won	
KBS Entertainment Awards	2022	Top Excellence Award in Show/Variety Category	I Like Songs	Nominated	
Korea Cultural Entertainment Awards	2009	Grand Prize (Daesang)	Jang Yoon-jeong	Won	
Korea Entertainment Arts Awards	2008	Female Singer Award	Jang Yoon-jeong	Won	
Korea Entertainment Arts Awards	2010	Female Singer Award	Jang Yoon-jeong	Won	
Korea Local Food Culture Exhibition Korean Food	2011	Culture Award	Jang Yoon-jeong	Won	
Korean Traditional Music Awards	2008	Female Singer	Jang Yoon-jeong	Won	
Korean Traditional Music Awards	2012	Grand Prize (Daesang) (female)	Jang Yoon-jeong	Won	
Korean Traditional Music Awards	2012	7th Female Singer Award	Jang Yoon-jeong	Won	
MBC Riverside Music Festival	1999	Grand Prize (Daesang)	Jang Yoon-jeong	Won	
MBC Top 10 Singer Song Festival	2004	Female Rookie Award	Jang Yoon-jeong	Won	
Melon Music Awards	2010	Trot Award	Come (올래)	Won	
Mnet Asian Music Awards	2005	Best Female Artist	Really! (짠짜라)	Nominated	
SBS Entertainment Awards	2008	Producer's Choice Award (TV Star category)	1000 Song Challenge	Won	
SBS Entertainment Awards	2009	Excellence Variety Award	1000 Song Challenge	Won	
SBS Entertainment Awards	2010	Producer's Choice Award (MC category)	1000 Song Challenge	Won	
SBS Entertainment Awards	2011	Netizen Popularity Award	1000 Song Challenge	Nominated	
SBS Entertainment Awards	2013	Best Couple Award	Jang Yoon-jeong (with Lee Hwi-jae); 1000 Song Challenge	Won	
SBS Entertainment Awards	2020	Top Excellence Award in Show/Variety Category	K-Trot in Town	Won	
SBS Gayo Daejeon	2004	Trot Award	—N/a	Won	
SBS Gayo Daejeon	2005	Trot Award	—N/a	Won	
SBS Gayo Daejeon	2006	Trot Award	—N/a	Won	
Seoul Music Awards	2006	Bonsang (Main Award)	—N/a	Won	
Seoul Music Awards	2008	Bonsang (Main Award)	—N/a	Won	
Seoul Music Awards	2009	Bonsang (Main Award)	—N/a	Won	
Seoul Music Awards	2011	Trot Award	—N/a	Won	
Seoul Music Awards	2021	Trot Award	To Destiny	Nominated	
Trot Awards	2020	Jury Special Award	Jang Yoon-jeong	Won	
Trot Awards	2020	10th Trot Singer Awards	Jang Yoon-jeong	Won	

=== State honors ===
Name of country, year given, and name of honor
Country or Organization	Year	Honor or Award	Ref.
South Korea (Note: Honors are given at the Korean Popular Culture and Arts Awards, arranged by the Korea Creative Content Agency and hosted by the Ministry of Culture, Sports and Tourism. They are awarded to those who have contributed to the arts and South Korea's pop culture.)	2017	Prime Minister's Commendation	

=== Listicles ===
Name of publisher, year listed, name of listicle, and placement
Publisher	Year	Listicle	Placement	Ref.
Forbes	2020	Korea Power Celebrity 40	15th	
Forbes	2021	Korea Power Celebrity 40	10th	
Forbes	2022	Korea Power Celebrity 40	13th	
