= Saturday Freedom =

South Korean television series

- Also known as: Declaration of Freedom Saturday
- Hangul: 자유선언 토요일
- Hanja: 自由宣言土曜日
- RR: Jayuseoneon toyoil
- MR: Chayusŏnŏn t'oyoil
- Genre: Reality television, Variety show
- Country of origin: South Korea
- Original language: Korean
- No. of episodes: 44

Production
- Executive producer: Kim Choong
- Producer: Kwon Jae-young
- Running time: Approx. 140 minutes per episode

Original release
- Network: KBS2
- Release: June 4, 2011 – March 31, 2012

Related
- Happy Sunday

Saturday Freedom (Korean: 자유선언 토요일; lit. 'Declaration of Freedom Saturday') was a South Korean reality-variety show shown on the KBS2 network, which competes directly against MBC's We Got Married and Infinite Challenge, and SBS' Star Junior Show Bungeoppang and Star King. The lineup ended on March 31, 2012, with Immortal Songs 2 becoming a separate program and Invincible Youth 2 moving into the time slot.

== History ==
Programs prior to Saturday Freedom featured a similar title. Declaration of Freedom Today is Saturday began airing on October 17, 1998, and aired until April 28, 2001. Beginning on May 5, 2001, Show Everyone's Saturday (쇼 여러분의 토요일) aired, then on November 10, 2001 Declaration of Freedom Saturday Big Operation (자유선언 토요대작전) took over and aired until November 1, 2003, which at this time KBS's Saturday lineup program was cancelled. It was revived on April 25, 2009, as Invincible Saturday (천하무적 토요일) and aired until December 25, 2010, and KBS's Saturday lineup program was cancelled once again. It was revived again as Saturday Freedom on June 4, 2011. On September 10, 2011, Saturday Freedom divided into two parts, Part 1 airing at 5:15PM KST and Part 2 airing at 6:15PM KST, in an effort to boost ratings.

== Broadcasting Times ==
- June 4–11, 2011 (17:35 – 19:55; 2 hours 20 minutes)
- June 18 – September 3, 2011 (17:50 – 19:55; 2 hour 5 minutes)
- September 10, 2011 – March 31, 2012 (17:15 – 19:55; 2 hours 40 minutes)
  - September 10, 2011 – March 31, 2012 (17:15 – 18:15; 1 hour; Part 1)
  - September 10, 2011 – March 31, 2012 (18:15 – 19:55; 1 hour 40 minutes; Part 2)

== Segments ==
=== Birth of a Family ===
- Aired: November 12, 2011 – March 31, 2012
- Starring: Lee Hwi-jae, Kim Byung-man, Boom, No Woo-jin, Hyuna (4Minute), G.NA, Yim Si-wan (ZE:A).

Birth of a Family (가족의 탄생) was an "animal communion variety" program and was first broadcast on November 12, 2011. The program is divided into two corners, Let's Live Together (같이 삽시다) and Birth of a Family (가족의 탄생). Let's Live Together features Lee Hwi-jae and Kim Byung-man as rare animals visit their home. Birth of a Family features idol groups living with and becoming the family of abandoned dogs, and helping them find new owners. Infinite and A Pink were the first groups of idols and were replaced with Hyuna of 4Minute, G.NA, and Siwan of ZE:A in March.

=== Immortal Songs 2 ===
- Aired: June 4, 2011 – March 31, 2012 (in Saturday Freedom. Airs today as stand-alone program.)
- Starring: Shin Dong-yup, Eun Ji-won, Moon Hee-joon.

Immortal Songs 2: Singing the Legend (불후의 명곡II - 전설을 노래하다; Romanized: Bulhueui Myeonggok II - Jeonseoleul Noraehada) is a music competition program and began airing on June 4, 2011. It is a revival of Immortal Songs, and features idol singers performing songs of legendary singers. The singers perform in front of an audience who vote for who they believe best presented the classic songs. It now airs as a separate program, as Immortal Songs 2: Singing the Legend, in the same time slot.

=== Secret ===
- Aired: June 4 – November 5, 2011
- Starring: Lee Hwi-jae, Shin Bong-sun, Kim Hee-chul.

Secret (시크릿) (Subtitle: Are You a Good Person?) was a game-talk show featuring secrets of celebrities. Stars must play games and succeed to prevent a secret of theirs from being revealed by a friend. Originally airing after Immortal Songs 2, the program faced difficulty when Immortal Songs 2 aired for too long, thus eating into the airtime of Secret. On one occasion, the program only aired for three minutes on July 23, 2011.
