= 1000 Song Challenge =

- Promotional image showing hosts Jang Yun-jeong and Lee Hwi-jae
- Also known as: Challenge 1000 Songs
- Genre: Reality television
- Written by: Park Mi-ra; Lee Ji-young; Lee Da-ae; Nam Chan-mi
- Directed by: Park Jae-yong
- Country of origin: South Korea
- Original language: Korean
- No. of episodes: 299

Production
- Producers: Park Je-yong; Yoon Tae-wook
- Running time: 75 minutes

Original release
- Network: SBS
- Release: October 22, 2000 – June 22, 2014

1000 Song Challenge (Korean: 도전 1000곡; RR: Dojeon 1000gok), also known as Challenge 1000 Songs, is a South Korean karaoke singing competition television series, which aired on SBS from 2000 to 2014. During the show, guests compete by singing popular songs accurately from memory. The songs are chosen randomly from a pool of 1000 songs. Unlike normal karaoke, the lyrics are not shown, so it is easier to make mistakes. The contestants with the highest scores proceed to the next round. In one segment of the show, "Run Karaoke", contestants race to the microphone and whoever gets there first gets to sing a song and gain points. In another segment, the contestants hear the beginning of a song, and the first one to correctly name the song gains points. The winner of the final round receives household items as prizes, such a humidifier or espresso machine. Many popular celebrities were invited to the show, including BoA, Shinhwa and Girls' Generation.

The show began airing on October 22, 2000, and was extremely popular in its early years. It aired on Sunday mornings and had mainly older viewers. SBS cancelled the show in 2014 because advertisement revenue was low, and they wanted to target young people. The last episode aired on June 22, 2014.

== Hosts ==
Various television personalities co-hosted the show throughout its nearly 14-year run. Comedian Lee Hwi-jae began hosting the show (with Jeong Hyeong-don) in April 2008, and continued until the show's cancellation in 2014. Trot singer Jang Yun-jeong first hosted the show for a year and a half, beginning in April 2006, and returned in August 2009. Lee and Jang were praised for their "smooth and entertaining" hosting style, and they won the "Best Couple Award" at the 2013 SBS Entertainment Awards. Jang left the show in April 2014 due to her pregnancy, and was replaced by Hyolyn.

List of hosts, showing when they hosted the show
Hosts		Dates
Kim Seung-hyun	Lee Seon-jin	October 22, 2000 – October 2002
Jeong Jae-hwan	Lee Yoo-jin	November 2002 – November 2004
Jeong Jae-hwan	Yoo Kyung-mi	November 2004 – October 2005
Kim Seung-hyun	Kim Bin-woo	November 2005 – April 2006
Yoo Jung-hyun	Jang Yun-jeong	April 2006 – October 2007
Yoo Jung-hyun	Han-young	October 2007 – December 2007
Kang Byung-kyu	Han-young	December 2007 – March 2008
Lee Hwi-jae	Jeong Hyeong-don	April 2008 – November 2008
Lee Hwi-jae	Kim Ra-na	December 2008 – August 9, 2009
Lee Hwi-jae	Jang Yun-jeong	August 16, 2009 – April 13, 2014
Lee Hwi-jae	Hyolyn	May 18, 2014 – June 8, 2014
Lee Hwi-jae	Shin Ji	June 22, 2014
