= Kwangwoon Electronics Technical High School =

High school in Seoul, South Korea

Kwangwoon Electronic Technical High School
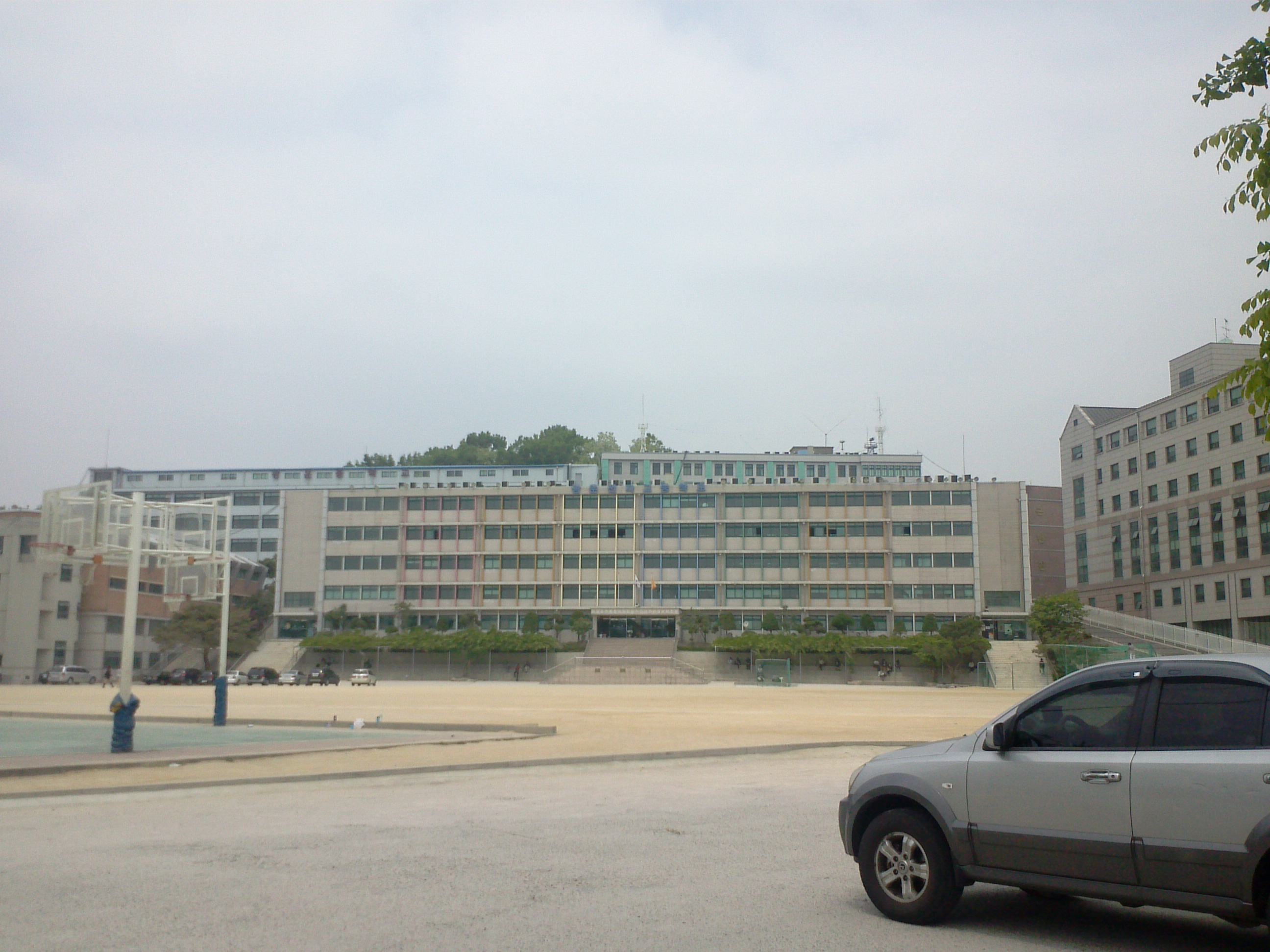

Location
- Seoul; Republic of Korea
- Coordinates: 37.6207°N 127.0562°E

Information
- Type: Technical, day
- Motto: Diligence and Sincerity, Thrift and Frugality, Inquiry and Practice
- Established: 1934
- Head of School: Kim Kyungchae
- Faculty: 100
- Gender: Boys
- Enrollment: 1106 total
- Average class size: 20 students
- Student to teacher ratio: 8:1
- Colors: Blue & Red

- Kwangwoon Electronics Technical High School
- Hangul: 광운전자공업고등학교
- Hanja: 光云電子工業高等學校
- RR: Gwangun jeonja gongeop godeunghakgyo
- MR: Kwangun chŏnja kongŏp kodŭnghakkyo

Kwangwoon Electronic Technical High School is a public technical, all-male high school located in Nowon-gu, a district in the northeastern area of Seoul, South Korea. It is a three-year training school with approximately 1,100 students and a teaching staff of about 100.

== History ==
Founded in 1934, it shares a lineage and history with Kwangwoon University and was originally its high school section. In December 1964, the current name was adopted. It received recognition as a training school specializing in the STEM fields, specifically engineering.

== Notable alumni ==
- Chang Hyuk-jin, footballer
- Ha Seok-ju, retired footballer
- Noh Haeng-seok, footballer
- Park Joo-ho, footballer
