= Robert Kelly (political analyst) =

American political scientist (born 1972)

Robert E. Kelly
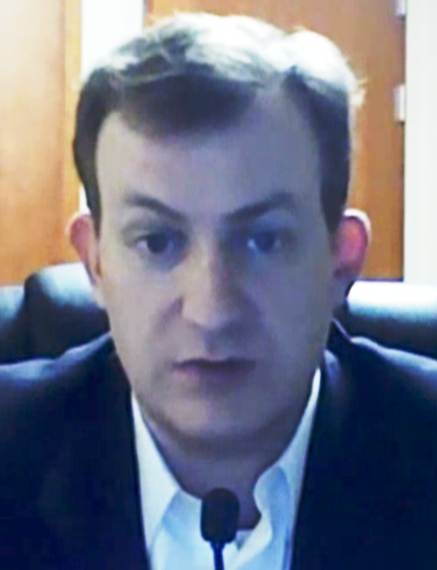
- Kelly in April 2013
- Education: Miami University (BA); Ohio State University (MA, PhD)
- Occupations: Political science professor, political analyst on inter-Korean affairs
- Known for: Political analysis of the Korean Peninsula; Gatecrashed BBC News interview (2017)
- Spouse: Kim Jung-a
- Children: 2

Robert E. Kelly is an American political analyst on inter-Korean affairs and professor in political science at Pusan National University. In March 2017, he and his family rose to fame when his live interview on BBC World News was gatecrashed by his children and wife.

== Early life and education ==
Originally from Cuyahoga County, Ohio, Kelly in 1994 graduated Phi Beta Kappa from Miami University with a B.A. in history and political science. Following his undergraduate studies, he attended Ohio State University and obtained an M.A. in international relations in 2002 and a Ph.D. in international relations in 2005 and wrote a dissertation titled, The Impact of Non-Governmental Organizations on the Bretton Woods Institutions. He studied in Germany and had an internship in the German Bundestag. He speaks German fluently.

== Career ==
2013 Wikinews interview with Kelly about Kim Jong-un and rising tensions with North Korea.

Kelly is an associate professor of international relations in the Department of Political Science and Diplomacy at Pusan National University in Busan, South Korea. As a political analyst on inter-Korean affairs, he contributes to print and televised media, and has been referred to as a "damn good Korea analyst" by one of his peers. He has made media appearances on the BBC World News, China Central Television and Al Jazeera and has written for several publications including The Diplomat and Foreign Affairs. He has also provided expert opinion for The Washington Post and Reuters. Kelly is furthermore a prolific contributor to The Interpreter, published by the Australian think tank Lowy Institute.

=== BBC News interview (2017) ===
On March 10, 2017, he and his family rose to fame when his live interview by James Menendez on the impeachment of Park Geun-hye, the President of South Korea, for the BBC World News from his home office was sequentially gatecrashed by his four-year-old daughter and nine-month-old son entering the room, then his wife, Jung-a Kim, sliding in to drag them out while knocking books off an air-mattress, before closing the door on her knees. The interview continued as normal, with the BBC News hailing the video as their favorite live TV moment of the week. It became a Twitter Moment and quickly went viral with all four family members becoming individual memes. In just one day, the video had over 6 million views on YouTube and became the No. 1 trending video on YouTube in the UK, later being named No. 10 on YouTube's list of the top 10 trending videos of 2017.

Many viewers and journalists incorrectly assumed the woman in the video was Kelly's nanny instead of his wife.

Kelly and his family returned to television on March 14 for an interview about the incident. In December 2017 he said that "for two weeks we were the most famous family on earth" but he thought it could be "the end of my career as a talking head."

=== Variety shows ===
Kelly's fame arising from the viral video led to his appearance on a South Korean reality television show that focuses on the struggles of fathers raising young children.

Year	Network	Title	Role	Notes
2017	KBS2	The Return of Superman	Guest	Ep. 184 and 206 (with his children, Marion & James)

== Select bibliography ==
- Kelly, Robert E. (December 27, 2011). "Korea-European Union relations: beyond the FTA?". International Relations of the Asia-Pacific. 12 (1): 101–132. doi:10.1093/IRAP/LCR020.
- ——— (December 1, 2011). "The German-Korean Unification Parallel". The Korean Journal of Defense Analysis. 23 (4): 457–472. Archived from the original on March 18, 2023.
- ——— (July 18, 2011). "A 'Confucian Long Peace' in pre-Western East Asia?" (PDF). European Journal of International Relations. 18 (3): 407–430. doi:10.1177/1354066111409771. S2CID 146715727.
- ——— (June 1, 2011). "Assessing the impact of NGOs on intergovernmental organizations: The case of the Bretton Woods Institutions". International Political Science Review. 32 (3): 323–344. doi:10.1177/0192512110380572. S2CID 145344682. SSRN 2386190.
- ——— (November 19, 2010). "American Dual Containment in Asia". Geopolitics. 15 (4): 705–725. doi:10.1080/14650041003718325. S2CID 144152785.
- ——— (June 1, 2008). "No 'return to the state': dependency and developmentalism against neo-liberalism". Development in Practice. 18 (3): 319–332. doi:10.1080/09614520802030342. S2CID 154309459.
- ——— (June 1, 2007). "Security Theory in the "New Regionalism"" (PDF). International Studies Review. 9 (2): 197–229. doi:10.1111/J.1468-2486.2007.00671.X.
- ——— (June 1, 2007). "From International Relations to Global Governance Theory: Conceptualizing NGOs after the Rio Breakthrough of 1992". Journal of Civil Society. 3 (1): 81–99. doi:10.1080/17448680701390786. S2CID 144199282.
- Lebow, Richard Ned; Kelly, Robert (October 1, 2001). "Thucydides and hegemony: Athens and the United States". Review of International Studies. 27 (4): 593–609. doi:10.1017/S0260210501005939. S2CID 146343652. SSRN 2384772.
