= Park Joo-ho =

South Korean footballer

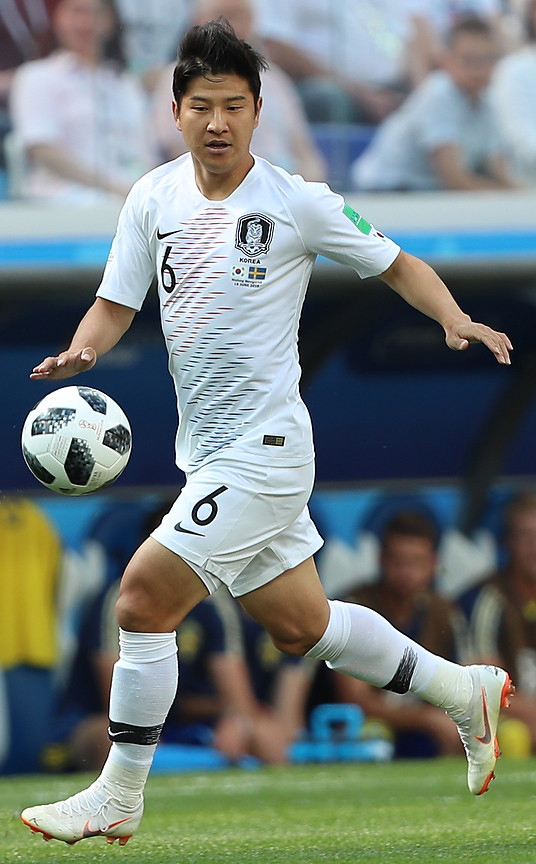
- Park with South Korea at the 2018 FIFA World Cup

Personal information
- Date of birth: 16 January 1987 (age 39)
- Place of birth: Yongin, South Korea
- Height: 1.75 m (5 ft 9 in)
- Positions: Left-back; midfielder

Youth career
- 2002–2004: Kwangwoon Electronics; Technical High School

College career
Years	Team	Apps	(Gls)
2005–2007	Soongsil University		

Senior career*
Years	Team	Apps	(Gls)
2008	Mito HollyHock	24	(0)
2009	Kashima Antlers	19	(0)
2010–2011	Júbilo Iwata	34	(2)
2011–2013	FC Basel	47	(1)
2013–2015	Mainz 05	44	(1)
2015–2017	Borussia Dortmund	7	(0)
2017	Borussia Dortmund II	6	(0)
2018–2020	Ulsan Hyundai	52	(0)
2021–2023	Suwon FC	75	(0)
Total		308	(4)

International career
2006–2007	South Korea U20	22 (Note: Includes one appearance against non-national team.)	(2)
2007–2014	South Korea U23	8 (Note: Includes seven appearances and one goal as an overage player in Asian Games.)	(1)
2010–2019	South Korea	40	(1)
Medal record
Men's football
Representing South Korea
AFC Asian Cup
Silver medal – second place	2015 Australia	Team
Asian Games
Gold medal – first place	2014 Incheon	Team
AFC Youth Championship
Bronze medal – third place	2006 India	Team
EAFF Championship
Gold medal – first place	2019 South Korea	Team
Silver medal – second place	2010 Japan	Team
- * Club domestic league appearances and goals

- Park Joo-ho
- Hangul: 박주호
- Hanja: 朴柱昊
- RR: Bak Juho
- MR: Pak Chuho

Park Joo-ho (Korean: 박주호; Korean pronunciation: [pak̚.t͈ɕu.ɦo] or [pak̚] [tɕu.ɦo]; born 16 January 1987) is a South Korean former football player who usually played defender. A versatile player, he primarily played left-back but also in the midfield as a defensive or wide midfielder.

== Early life ==
Born in Yongin and raised in Hanam, Park began playing football in sixth grade, relatively late compared to his peers. At that time there were no elementary schools in Hanam with a football program so he commuted to school in Seoul together with his neighbor and future national teammate Lee Yong. He attended Kwangwoon Electronics Technical High School and Soongsil University. While at university, he gained the interest of notable local and Japanese top-flight clubs but was not offered a contract after medicals revealed a back injury.

== Club career ==
=== Career in Japan ===
Park started his professional career by joining J2 League club Mito HollyHock in 2008 after recovering from his back injury. He advanced to the top division after his debut season, and won the 2009 J1 League and the 2010 J.League Cup with Kashima Antlers and Júbilo Iwata respectively.

=== Basel ===
On 25 June 2011, Swiss Super League club Basel announced that Park had signed a four-year contract with them. He joined Basel's first team for their 2011–12 season under head coach Thorsten Fink. To the beginning of their 2011–12 season Park was a member of the Basel team that won the 2011 Uhrencup, beating both Hertha Berlin 3–0 and West Ham United 2–1 to lead the table on goal difference above Young Boys. After playing in six test games, Park played his domestic league debut for the club in the away game in the Swissporarena on 20 August 2011 as Basel were defeated 3–1 by Luzern. Park soon established himself as Basel's first-choice left-back.

Basel entered the 2011–12 UEFA Champions League in the group stage. On 7 December 2011, during the Champions League group C match at home in the St. Jakob-Park he helped Basel defeat Manchester United to make his team become the first Swiss club to advance to the knockout stage of a Champions League. Basel won the match 2–1, sending United out of the Champions league. He also contributed to the team's 1–0 first-leg victory over Bayern Munich in the round of 16 by stopping Arjen Robben successfully. However, the team suffered a 7–0 defeat in the second leg and, therefore, it was the German team who advanced to the next round. At the end of the 2011–12 season Park won the Double with his new club. They won the League Championship title with 20 points advantage. The team won the Swiss Cup, winning the final 4–2 in a penalty shootout against Luzern.

The following season, Basel had to rotate their players a lot because they played twenty European games, including Champions League qualifiers and Europa League matches. Park wasn't guaranteed a consistent position as a starter, but still got enough appearances. Basel had started in the 2012–13 UEFA Champions League in the qualifying rounds. But were knocked out of the competition by CFR Cluj in the play-off round. They then continued in the 2012–13 UEFA Europa League group stage. Ending the group in second position, Basel continued in the knockout phase. Missing the first leg due to a suspension, Park played the second leg of quarter-final matches against Tottenham Hotspur, whom they beat 4–1 on penalties after a 4–4 aggregate draw to progress to the semi-finals. In the semi-final Basel were being matched against the reigning UEFA Champions League holders Chelsea. Park played in the first leg, but Chelsea won both games advancing 5–2 on aggregate and eventually winning the competition.

Park scored his first goal for the club on 21 April 2013 in the away game at the Stockhorn Arena as Basel played a 2–2 draw with Thun. At the end of the 2012–13 Swiss Super League he won his second Championship title with the team. In the 2012–13 Swiss Cup Basel reached the final, but were runners up behind Grasshopper Club, being defeated 4–3 on penalties, following a 1–1 draw after extra time.

On 17 July 2013, it was announced that Park was leaving the club. During his two season with them, Park played a total of 107 games for Basel scoring that one goal. 47 of these games were in the Swiss Super League, eight in the Swiss Cup, 22 in the UEFA competitions (Champions League and Europa League) and 30 were friendly games.

=== Mainz 05 ===
On 17 July 2013, Mainz 05 announced the signing of Park on a full transfer from Basel. He signed a two-year contract through June 2015 with a club option for an additional two years. He played 27 matches as a left-back or a central midfielder for Mainz in the 2013–14 Bundesliga, and played for them in qualifying for the Europa League. He was named in player rankings of football magazine kicker after the end of the season.

=== Borussia Dortmund ===
Park moved to Borussia Dortmund, following Thomas Tuchel who coached him in Mainz. On 17 September 2015, he played his first match for Dortmund in a Europa League match against Krasnodar, and led Dortmund to a 2–1 win by having a goal and an assist. Afterwards, however, he spent much time on Dortmund's bench during two seasons.

Furthermore, Park was sent to the club's reserve team by new manager Peter Bosz at the beginning of the 2017–18 season. Park finally left Dortmund on 3 December 2017.

=== Ulsan Hyundai ===
Park signed a four-year contract with Ulsan Hyundai on 18 December 2017. His good form in the first half of the 2018 season earned him a spot in the World Cup squad that summer. However, the hamstring injury he sustained during the opening group stage match against Sweden ruled him out for the rest of the tournament. He eventually returned to the pitch in the derby match against Pohang in September but was not able to regain his form and left out of the squad for the 2019 AFC Asian Cup that January. He was appointed a vice-captain ahead of the 2019 season. A long-standing minor stress fracture he sustained to his shin in March prevented him from playing consistently throughout the season as he had opted to play through the pain instead of taking time off to treat it. With the 2020 season being delayed by several months due to the COVID-19 pandemic, he spent that period of time rehabilitating. Although he only appeared in 12 league games, he played a major role in Ulsan's run in the 2020 AFC Champions League. During the final against Persepolis, he started at left back. His misplaced pass led to Perspolis scoring the first goal but Ulsan won after Júnior Negrão equalized minutes later and converted a penalty in the second half. He decided not to see out his contract as new incoming manager Hong Myung-bo could not guarantee him playing time.

=== Suwon FC ===
On 27 January 2021, it was announced that Park had signed with Suwon FC, which had just been promoted to the top flight. He announced his retirement in the middle of the 2023 season, playing his final game on 6 June 2023 against his former club Ulsan.

== International career ==
Park captained South Korean under-20 team in the 2007 FIFA U-20 World Cup.

On 18 January 2010, Park made his first international cap for South Korea in a friendly against Finland.

On 28 May 2014, Park was selected for the South Korean squad for the 2014 FIFA World Cup to replace injured player Kim Jin-su. However, he didn't play any matches while South Korea finished at the bottom of their group.

Park was one of the three over-aged players in South Korea's squad for the 2014 Asian Games, and played in a defensive midfield position as Kim Jin-su preferred playing as a left back. He scored in the round of 16 match against Hong Kong. He played all matches as starter, and became a gold medalist. His gold medal allowed him to be exempted from the two-year mandatory military service and continue his career in the Bundesliga.

Park also played as a defensive midfielder and Ki Sung-yueng's partner in the 2015 AFC Asian Cup, helping South Korea advance to the Asian Cup final for the first time in 27 years.

Park was going to participate as a main player in the 2018 FIFA World Cup. However, he sustained a thigh injury during the first match against Sweden and was ruled out for the rest of the tournament.

On 16 October 2018, Park scored his first senior international goal against Panama.

== Administrative career ==
Shortly after the Korea Pro-Footballers' Association (KPFA) was registered as a member organization of FIFPro, Park was voted into the inaugural board and served as vice-president until his retirement.

In February 2024, the Korea Football Association (KFA) announced his appointment as a member of the selection committee in the search for a new men's national team manager. In July, he was threatened with legal action by the KFA over a video he had uploaded on his YouTube channel. He had been filming with fellow commentator Kim Hwan to discuss the KFA's lack of progress in selecting a new national team manager over the past five months and had reacted with surprise regarding the real-time news of Hong Myung-bo's appointment as the new manager. After that, he explained his reaction and further reiterated the fact he had no knowledge of the appointment despite being part of the committee responsible for the selection of coaches and his frustration with the disorganized nature of the selection process. The reaction was not edited out and the full video was uploaded, garnering several million views. The KFA eventually backed down when football fans (already furious at appointment of Hong, who was managing K League 1 club Ulsan HD) and sports journalists criticized the organization. Park refused to retract his claims of cronyism and disorganized leadership. Both retired and active players took to social media to declare their support for him while other veterans, including several of Hong's own contemporaries, backed up his claims by revealing that it had been going on for over two decades.

The incident led to the Ministry of Culture, Sports and Tourism (MCST)'s Sports Ethics Center conducting an independent probe. Park eventually resigned from his position and joined football commentator Park Moon-sung in testifying before an inquiry at the National Assembly that September. There were differences between MCST's findings and Park's contentions. The findings revealed that Hong and David Wagner received the most votes from members of the selection committee including Park, and that the members agreed to give the final say to Jung Hae-seong, the chairman of the committee. On the contrary, the MCST pointed out that KFA president Chung Mong-gyu's attempt to overturn Hong's appointment was the violation of procedure. Jung Hae-seong had recommended Hong to president Chung and immediately resigned from the committee after the president rejected the recommendation. The president, who preferred foreign managers to domestic managers, arbitrarily authorized Lee Lim-saeng to negotiate with candidates, but Lee reached the same conclusion as Jung Hae-seong.

== Personal life ==
Park met his Swiss wife Anna while playing for Basel; she was working at the stadium cafe and had met his family during their visit before being introduced to him. They have three children, daughter Eden/Na-eun (born in 2015), and sons Aciel/Geon-hoo (2017) and Élyséen/Jin-woo (2020). In August 2026, they announced that they were expecting their fourth child. After previously keeping his family out of the spotlight, Park and their oldest two children joined the cast of The Return of Superman in 2018.

In 2020, Park opened his own YouTube channel "Captain PaChuHO" (캡틴 파추호), a play on his daughter's pronunciation of his name when she was a toddler. It initially began with vlogs featuring his life as a footballer and father. After his retirement, he began uploading content featuring commentaries about Korean football or interviews with former teammates.

In July 2023, he joined tvN Sports as a commentator. He mainly covers AFC Champions League and Bundesliga games broadcast domestically. He was also part of the team covering the 2023 AFC Asian Cup on site in Qatar.

== Career statistics ==
=== Club ===
As of 6 June 2023

Appearances and goals by club, season and competition
Club	Season	League			National cup		League cup		Continental		Total	
Club	Season	Division	Apps	Goals	Apps	Goals	Apps	Goals	Apps	Goals	Apps	Goals
Mito HollyHock	2008	J2 League	24	0	2	0	—		—		26	0
Kashima Antlers	2009	J1 League	19	0	3	0	0	0	6	0	28	0
Júbilo Iwata	2010	J1 League	23	2	0	0	5	1	—		28	3
Júbilo Iwata	2011	J1 League	11	0	—		0	0	—		11	0
Júbilo Iwata	Total		34	2	0	0	5	1	—		39	3
Basel	2011–12	Swiss Super League	26	0	5	0	—		8	0	39	0
Basel	2012–13	Swiss Super League	21	1	3	0	—		14	0	38	1
Basel	Total		47	1	8	0	—		22	0	77	1
Mainz 05	2013–14	Bundesliga	27	1	2	0	—		—		29	1
Mainz 05	2014–15	Bundesliga	16	0	1	0	—		2	0	19	0
Mainz 05	2015–16	Bundesliga	1	0	1	0	—		—		2	0
Mainz 05	Total		44	1	4	0	—		2	0	50	1
Borussia Dortmund	2015–16	Bundesliga	5	0	0	0	—		4	1	9	1
Borussia Dortmund	2016–17	Bundesliga	2	0	0	0	—		0	0	2	0
Borussia Dortmund	Total		7	0	0	0	—		4	1	11	1
Borussia Dortmund II	2016–17	Regionalliga West	2	0	—		—		—		2	0
Borussia Dortmund II	2017–18	Regionalliga West	4	0	—		—		—		4	0
Borussia Dortmund II	Total		6	0	—		—		—		6	0
Ulsan Hyundai	2018	K League 1	17	0	2	0	—		7	0	26	0
Ulsan Hyundai	2019	K League 1	23	0	0	0	—		4	0	27	0
Ulsan Hyundai	2020	K League 1	12	0	1	0	—		8	0	21	0
Ulsan Hyundai	Total		52	0	3	0	—		19	0	74	0
Suwon FC	2021	K League 1	29	0	0	0	—		—		29	0
Suwon FC	2022	K League 1	32	0	0	0	—		—		32	0
Suwon FC	2023	K League 1	14	0	0	0	—		—		14	0
Suwon FC	Total		75	0	0	0	—		—		75	0
Career total			308	4	20	0	5	1	53	1	386	6

=== International ===
As of 11 December 2019

Appearances and goals by national team and year
National team	Year	Apps	Goals
South Korea	2010	6	0
South Korea	2011	1	0
South Korea	2012	4	0
South Korea	2013	2	0
South Korea	2014	4	0
South Korea	2015	11	0
South Korea	2016	3	0
South Korea	2017	1	0
South Korea	2018	7	1
South Korea	2019	1	0
Career total		40	1

Scores and results list South Korea's goal tally first.

List of international goals scored by Park Joo-ho
No.	Date	Venue	Opponent	Score	Result	Competition
1	16 October 2018	Cheonan Baekseok Stadium, Cheonan, South Korea	Panama	1–0	2–2	Friendly

== Honours ==
=== Player ===
Kashima Antlers

- J1 League: 2009

Júbilo Iwata

- J.League Cup: 2010

Basel

- Swiss Super League: 2011–12, 2012–13
- Swiss Cup: 2011–12

Borussia Dortmund

- DFB-Pokal: 2016–17

Ulsan Hyundai

- AFC Champions League: 2020

South Korea U20

- AFC Youth Championship third place: 2006

South Korea U23

- Asian Games: 2014

South Korea

- AFC Asian Cup runner-up: 2015
- EAFF Championship: 2019

Individual

- K League All-Star: 2019

=== Television personality ===
List of awards and nominations received by TV personality Park Joo-ho
Award ceremony	Year	Category	Nominated work	Result	Ref.
KBS Entertainment Awards	2019	Grand Prize	The Return of Superman	Won	
KBS Entertainment Awards	2022	Best Entertainer Award	The Return of Superman	Won	
