= K-Trot in Town =

South Korean television show

- Promotional Poster
- Hangul: 트롯신이 떴다
- RR: Teurotsini tteotda
- MR: T'ŭrossini ttŏtta
- Genre: Reality; Music
- Written by: Yook So-young
- Starring: Singers: Nam Jin; Kim Yeon-ja; Sul Woon-do; Jin Sun; Joo Hyun-mi; Jang Yoon-jeong; MC: Boom; Jung Yong-hwa
- Country of origin: South Korea
- Original language: Korean
- No. of seasons: 2
- No. of episodes: 41

Production
- Production locations: South Korea; Vietnam
- Running time: 100 minutes

Original release
- Network: SBS
- Release: March 4 – December 23, 2020

K-Trot in Town (Korean: 트롯신이 떴다) is a South Korea reality show program on SBS starring Nam Jin, Kim Yeon-ja, Sul Woon-do, Jin Sung, Joo Hyun-mi and Jang Yoon-jeong as the main cast, along with Boom and Jung Yong-hwa as the show's MCs. The show aired on SBS every Wednesday at 22:00 (KST) starting from March 4, 2020.

Broadcast time moved to 20:55 (KST) beginning September 2, 2020.

== Synopsis ==
It is a reality program where reputable veteran trot singers travel to various countries to hold busking events. Through the busking events, they aim to introduce the genre of Korean trot to people in other countries through their performances.

From episodes 7 to 25, the program focuses more on online busking events, due to the COVID-19 pandemic.

Starting from episode 26, the program will go into season 2 and introduce a new project "Last Chance", in the form of an audition show for unknown trot singers, and the cast singers become judges.

== Casts ==
=== Singers ===
- Nam Jin
- Kim Yeon-ja
- Sul Woon-do
- Jin Sung
- Joo Hyun-mi
- Jang Yoon-jeong

=== MCs ===
- Boom (Episode 1-25)
- Jung Yong-hwa (Episode 1-25)

=== Special MCs ===
- Yang Se-hyung (Episode 15-18)
- Jang Do-yeon (Episode 19-22)
- Kim Jong-kook (Episode 38)
- Shin Dong-yup (Episode 41)

== Episodes ==
Ep.	Perform Artists	Country	Ref.
1 – 6	Kim Yeon-ja	Vietnam	
1 – 6	Sul Woon-do	Vietnam	
1 – 6	Jin Sung	Vietnam	
1 – 6	Joo Hyun-mi	Vietnam	
1 – 6	Jang Yoon-jeong	Vietnam	
4 – 6	Nam Jin	Vietnam	

== Rating ==
- In this table, the blue numbers represent the lowest ratings and the red numbers represent the highest ratings.

Ep.	Original broadcast date	Average audience share		
Ep.	Original broadcast date	Nielsen Korea		
Ep.	Original broadcast date	Nationwide		
Ep.	Original broadcast date	Part 1	Part 2	Part 3
1	March 4, 2020	9.2%	14.9%	—N/a (Note: Beginning episode 25, each episode of the show is aired in 3 parts)
2	March 11, 2020	12.1%	14.7%	—N/a
3	March 18, 2020	11.8%	15.9%	—N/a
4	March 25, 2020	11.2%	14.7%	—N/a
5	April 1, 2020	11.6%	14.9%	—N/a
6	April 8, 2020	10.8%	12.8%	—N/a
7	April 22, 2020 (Note: The show was moved to the following week due to live 2020 South Korean legislative election balloting results.)	9.4%	11.6%	—N/a
8	April 29, 2020	8.1%	9.9%	—N/a
9	May 6, 2020	7.4%	9.5%	—N/a
10	May 13, 2020	5.8%	7.5%	—N/a
11	May 20, 2020	6.2%	8.0%	—N/a
12	May 27, 2020	6.8%	7.1%	—N/a
13	June 3, 2020	5.9%	7.8%	—N/a
14	June 10, 2020	6.7%	8.2%	—N/a
15	June 17, 2020	6.2%	7.2%	—N/a
16	June 24, 2020	5.0%	7.8%	—N/a
17	July 1, 2020	4.7%	6.8%	—N/a
18	July 8, 2020	5.5%	7.0%	—N/a
19	July 15, 2020	5.9%	6.5%	—N/a
20	July 22, 2020	5.4%	6.7%	—N/a
21	July 29, 2020	5.8%	8.1%	—N/a
22	August 5, 2020	4.3%	5.0%	—N/a
23	August 12, 2020	4.9%	7.1%	—N/a
24	August 19, 2020	6.0%	8.2%	—N/a
25	September 2, 2020	7.0%	9.4%	10.7%
26	September 9, 2020	7.7%	12.0%	12.4%
27	September 16, 2020	7.4%	11.2%	11.7%
28	September 23, 2020	8.1%	11.8%	13.3%
29	September 30, 2020	2.0%	2.7%	3.2%
30	October 7, 2020	8.5%	12.1%	12.4%
31	October 14, 2020	7.5%	10.2%	11.1%
32	October 21, 2020	8.8%	11.2%	11.7%
33	October 28, 2020	8.9%	11.7%	11.9%
34	November 4, 2020	7.0%	11.3%	11.7%
35	November 11, 2020	9.1%	12.7%	12.7%
36	November 18, 2020	8.7%	11.8%	12.5%
37	November 25, 2020	9.9%	13.0%	12.8%
38	December 2, 2020	9.4%	11.8%	12.5%
39	December 9, 2020	10.8%	13.6%	13.9%
40	December 16, 2020	10.6%	13.6%	14.2%
41	December 23, 2020	11.7%	14.7%	16.6%

== Awards and nominations ==
Year	Award	Category	Recipient	Result	Ref.
2020	14th SBS Entertainment Awards	Scriptwriter of the Year	Yook So-young	Won	
2020	14th SBS Entertainment Awards	Excellence Program Award in Reality Category	K-Trot in Town	Won	
2020	14th SBS Entertainment Awards	Top Excellence Award in Show/Variety Category	Jang Yoon-jeong	Won	
