= The Return of Superman (South Korean TV program) =

South Korean reality-variety show

- The Return of Superman newest logo starting from episode 117.
- Also known as: Superman Is Back; Superman Returns
- Hangul: 슈퍼맨이 돌아왔다
- RR: Syupeomaeni dorawatda
- MR: Syup'ŏmaeni torawatta
- Genre: Reality television
- Created by: KBS
- Presented by: Kim Jong-min; RALRAL
- Starring: Kim Jun-ho; Jang Dong-min; Park Soo-hong; Woo Hye-rim; Park In-bee; Hwang Min-woo; Hwang Min-ho
- Opening theme: Superman: Main Title March
- Country of origin: South Korea
- Original language: Korean
- No. of seasons: 1
- No. of episodes: 608 (list of episodes)

Production
- Producer: Jo Seong-suk
- Production location: South Korea
- Camera setup: Multicamera setup
- Running time: Ep. 1–15 (85 minutes); Ep. 16–21 (95 minutes); Ep. 22–present (100 minutes)
- Production company: Koen Media Corporation

Original release
- Network: KBS2
- Release: September 19, 2013 – present

The Return of Superman (Korean: 슈퍼맨이 돌아왔다; also known as Superman Is Back) is a South Korean reality-variety show that airs on KBS2. The Return of Superman used to be one of the two segments (the other segment is 1 Night 2 Days) on Happy Sunday. The original three episodes pilot aired as a Chuseok holiday special from September 19 till September 21 of 2013, starring Lee Hwi-jae, Choo Sung-hoon, Jang Hyun-sung. Start from June 16, 2024, the show is presented by actress Choi Ji-woo and comedienne Ahn Young-mi, along with some casts of this show (Most appeared: Kim Jun-ho, Moon Hee-joon, and Jasson).

KBS announced on October 17, 2013, that The Return of Superman will officially become part of the Happy Sunday lineup starting on November 3, 2013. The show replaces Star Family Show Mamma Mia, which was moved to Wednesday nights. Since November 6, 2025, the release time changed again to Wednesday started from 8:30 PM KST.

== Synopsis ==
Celebrity dads are left to care for their kids alone for 48 hours without the help of anyone else, while their wives leave home to enjoy some relaxing time off. The wives are shown leaving the home before the 48 hours begins and coming back to greet their family once the 48 hours have ended. During the 48 hours the dads and children are either doing a task the wives have written out for the dads to complete, or the dads are exploring new activities with their kids. Occasionally celebrity friends of the dads will stop by to interact with the kids.

== Format ==
The show is filmed with set up cameras and cameraman hiding in tents and playhouses in each of the celebrities' actual home. Family and friends of the celebrity dads will occasionally show up in episodes. In each episode, as the show moves from one family to the next, a brief narration by the narrator is given to introduce the next segment of the episode.

During each individual family segment the parents (husband and wife), with the exception of Junu, Junseo and Haru who were old enough to answer questions when they started the show, would give a talking head interview while being asked questions by the shows PDs (producers) about the current situation being aired.

Starting from episode 520 (aired on April 7, 2024), the MC(s) gather with the parents featured in each episode in the same studio to provide their reactions and comments on a family's life that is being observed.

== Cast ==
=== Current cast ===
Current Fathers

*Children are listed from oldest to youngest, and families are listed in order of appearance on the show.
*Highlight = The Representative For Each Family.

Duration	Dad	Children	Mom/Wife	Filming location
2022– Ep 444–present	Kim Jun-ho; Fencer	Son: Kim Eun-woo; DOB: October 22, 2021 (age 4)	Yoo Jung-hyun; Flight Attendant	Seoul, South Korea
2022– Ep 444–present	Kim Jun-ho; Fencer	Son: Kim Jung-woo; DOB: May 2, 2023 (age 3)	Yoo Jung-hyun; Flight Attendant	Seoul, South Korea
2024– Ep 529–present	Jang Dong-min; Comedian	Daughter: Jang Ji-woo DOB: June 17, 2022 (age 4)	Joo Yu-jin	TBA, South Korea
2024– Ep 529–present	Jang Dong-min; Comedian	Son: Jang Si-woo DOB: January 23, 2024 (age 2)	Joo Yu-jin	TBA, South Korea
2024– Ep 537–present	Park Soo-hong; Comedian	Daughter: Park Jae-yi (Jeon-beokie) DOB: October 14, 2024 (age 21 months)	Kim Da-ye; Housewives	TBA, South Korea

Current Mother(s)

*Children are listed from oldest to youngest, and families are listed in order of appearance on the show.
*Highlight = The Representative For Each Family.

Duration	Dad	Children	Mom/Wife	Filming location
2024; Ep 554–present	Shin Min-chul; Taekwondo athlete	Son: Shin Si-woo; DOB: February 23, 2022 (age 4)	Woo Hye-rim; Singer	TBA, South Korea
2024; Ep 554–present	Shin Min-chul; Taekwondo athlete	Son: Shin Si-an; DOB: December 1, 2024 (age 19 months)	Woo Hye-rim; Singer	TBA, South Korea
2025– Ep 569–present	Nam Gi-hyeop; Professional Golfer	Daughter: Nam In-seo; DOB: April 21, 2023 (age 3)	Park In-bee; Professional Golfer	TBA, South Korea
2025– Ep 569–present	Nam Gi-hyeop; Professional Golfer	Daughter: Nam Yeon-seo; DOB: October 28, 2024 (age 20 months)	Park In-bee; Professional Golfer	TBA, South Korea

Current Uncle(s)

*Children are listed from oldest to youngest, and families are listed in order of appearance on the show.

Duration	Uncle	Children	Filming location

Current Older Sibling(s)

*Younger siblings are listed from oldest to youngest, and families are listed in order of appearance on the show.

Duration	Older Sibling	Younger Sibling(s)	Filming location
2024; Ep 524–546	Hwang Min-woo; Trot singer DOB: May 17, 2005 (age 21)	Little Brother: Hwang Min-ho; Trot singer DOB: October 22, 2013 (age 12)	TBA, South Korea

Current Narrator(s)

Duration	Narrator
2024–present Ep 530–present	Choi Ji-woo
2024–present Ep 530–present	Ahn Young-mi

=== Former cast ===
*Families and narrators are listed in order of exiting the show.

Former Fathers

Duration	Dad	Children	Mom/Wife	Filming location
2013; Chuseok Special Part 1–3	(United States) Lee Hyun-woo; Singer/Actor	Son: Lee Dong-ha; DOB: September 2009	Yi Je-ni; Museum Curator	Seoul, South Korea
2013; Chuseok Special Part 1–3	(United States) Lee Hyun-woo; Singer/Actor	Son: Lee Ju-ha; DOB: April 2011	Yi Je-ni; Museum Curator	Seoul, South Korea
2014; Ep 25–31^{3}	Kim Jung-tae; Actor^{1}	Son: Kim Ji-hoo (Yakkung); DOB: February 2011^{2}	Jeon Yeo-jin; University Professor	Busan, South Korea
2013–2014; Chuseok Special Part 1–3; Ep 1–33	Jang Hyun-sung; Actor	Son: Jang Jun-woo (Junu); DOB: July 17, 2003 (age 23)	Yang Huijeong; Bakery Owner	Seoul, South Korea
2013–2014; Chuseok Special Part 1–3; Ep 1–33	Jang Hyun-sung; Actor	Son: Jang Jun-seo; DOB: July 29, 2007 (age 18)	Yang Huijeong; Bakery Owner	Seoul, South Korea
2013–2015; Ep 1–58	(Canada) Tablo; Rapper/Songwriter	Daughter: Lee Ha-ru; DOB: May 2, 2010 (age 16)	Kang Hye-jung; Actress	Seoul, South Korea
2015; Ep 59–103	Uhm Tae-woong; Actor	Daughter: Uhm Ji-on; DOB: June 18, 2013 (age 13)	Yoon Hye-jin; Ballerina	Opo-eup, Gwangju, Gyeonggi Province, South Korea
2014–2016; Ep 34–116, 156	Song Il-gook; Actor	Son: Song Dae-han; DOB: March 16, 2012 (age 14) (Fraternal triplet)	Jung Seung-yeon; High Court Judge^{5}	Songdo, Incheon, South Korea
2014–2016; Ep 34–116, 156	Song Il-gook; Actor	Son: Song Min-guk; DOB: March 16, 2012 (age 14) (Fraternal triplet)	Jung Seung-yeon; High Court Judge^{5}	Songdo, Incheon, South Korea
2014–2016; Ep 34–116, 156	Song Il-gook; Actor	Son: Song Man-se; DOB: March 16, 2012 (age 14) (Fraternal triplet)	Jung Seung-yeon; High Court Judge^{5}	Songdo, Incheon, South Korea
2013–2017; Chuseok Special Part 1–3; Ep 1–122, 155–160, 205–206,250	(Japan) Choo Sung-hoon; MMA Fighter	Daughter: Choo Sa-rang; DOB: October 24, 2011 (age 14)	(Japan) Shiho Yano; Model	Minato, Tokyo, Japan
2016; Ep 127–Ep 162	Yang Dong-geun; Actor/Hip-hop artist	Son: Yang Joon-seo; DOB: March 28, 2013 (age 13)	Park Ga-ram; Office Worker/Former Music Video Model	Samseong-dong, Gangnam, Seoul, South Korea
2016; Ep 127–Ep 162	Yang Dong-geun; Actor/Hip-hop artist	Daughter: Yang Joy; DOB: October 11, 2015 (age 10)	Park Ga-ram; Office Worker/Former Music Video Model	Samseong-dong, Gangnam, Seoul, South Korea
2016; Ep 129–Ep 162	Oh Ji-ho; Actor	Daughter: Oh Seo-heun (Jibong-i.e.); DOB: December 30, 2015 (age 10)	Eun Bo-ah; Fashion Designer	Seongsu-dong, Seongdong, Seoul, South Korea
2016–2017 Ep 117–182	Lee Beom-soo; Actor	Daughter: Lee So-eul; DOB: March 1, 2011 (age 15)	Lee Yoon-jin; English interpreter	Gangnam, Seoul, South Korea
2016–2017 Ep 117–182	Lee Beom-soo; Actor	Son: Lee Da-eul; DOB: February 21, 2014 (age 12)	Lee Yoon-jin; English interpreter	Gangnam, Seoul, South Korea
2016, 2017; Ep 130-162 (regular); Ep 193 (special appearances)	In Gyo-jin; Actor	Daughter: In Ha-eun; DOB: December 4, 2015 (age 10)	So Yi-hyun; Actress	~~Jayang-dong, Gwangjin, Seoul, South Korea~~ Namyang-ju, Gyeonggi-do, South Korea
2016–2018; Ep 114–210	Ki Tae-young; Actor	Daughter: Kim Ro-hee; DOB: April 12, 2015 (age 11)	Eugene; Singer/Actress	Gangnam, Seoul, South Korea
2013–2018; Chuseok Special Part 1–3; Ep 1–220 2018–2019 Ep 249–251, 287(guest appearance)	Lee Hwi-jae; Comedian/Host	Son: Lee Seo-eon; DOB: March 15, 2013 (age 13) (Fraternal twin)	Moon Jeong-won; Florist	Dongcheon-dong, Yongin, South Korea (Episode 1 – 176) Cheongdam, Gangnam, Seoul, South Korea (Episode 176–220,)
2013–2018; Chuseok Special Part 1–3; Ep 1–220 2018–2019 Ep 249–251, 287(guest appearance)	Lee Hwi-jae; Comedian/Host	Son: Lee Seo-jun; DOB: March 15, 2013 (age 13) (Fraternal twin)	Moon Jeong-won; Florist	Dongcheon-dong, Yongin, South Korea (Episode 1 – 176) Cheongdam, Gangnam, Seoul, South Korea (Episode 176–220,)
2018–2019; Ep. 221–259	Bong Tae-gyu; Actor	Son: Bong Si-ha; DOB: December 1, 2015 (age 10)	Hasisi Park; Photographer	Jeongneung, Seongbuk, Seoul, South Korea
2018–2019; Ep. 221–259	Bong Tae-gyu; Actor	Daughter: Bong Bon-bi (Bonvie); DOB: May 21, 2018 (age 8)	Hasisi Park; Photographer	Jeongneung, Seongbuk, Seoul, South Korea
2019; Ep 268–278	Jang Beom-june; Singer/songwriter	Daughter: Jang Jo-ah; DOB: July 26, 2014 (age 12)	Song Seung-ah; Actress	Seoul, South Korea
2019; Ep 268–278	Jang Beom-june; Singer/songwriter	Son: Jang Ha-da; DOB: September 19, 2017 (age 8)	Song Seung-ah; Actress	Seoul, South Korea
2017–2019; Ep 163–280	Ko Ji-yong; Businessman/Former Idol-Singer	Son: Ko Seung-jae; DOB: October 6, 2014 (age 11)	Heo Yang-lim; Professor/Doctor	Bangbae-dong, Seocho District, Seoul, South Korea
2015–2019; Ep 89–298	Lee Dong-gook ^{7} Professional Football (Soccer) player	Daughter: Lee Jae-si; DOB: August 14, 2007 (age 18) (Fraternal twin)	Lee Soo-jin; Housewife/former Miss Korea contestant	Songdo, Incheon, South Korea
2015–2019; Ep 89–298	Lee Dong-gook ^{7} Professional Football (Soccer) player	Daughter: Lee Jae-ah; DOB: August 14, 2007 (age 18) (Fraternal twin)	Lee Soo-jin; Housewife/former Miss Korea contestant	Songdo, Incheon, South Korea
2015–2019; Ep 89–298	Lee Dong-gook ^{7} Professional Football (Soccer) player	Daughter: Lee Seol-ah; DOB: July 18, 2013 (age 13) (Fraternal twin)	Lee Soo-jin; Housewife/former Miss Korea contestant	Songdo, Incheon, South Korea
2015–2019; Ep 89–298	Lee Dong-gook ^{7} Professional Football (Soccer) player	Daughter: Lee Soo-ah; DOB: July 18, 2013 (age 13) (Fraternal twin)	Lee Soo-jin; Housewife/former Miss Korea contestant	Songdo, Incheon, South Korea
2015–2019; Ep 89–298	Lee Dong-gook ^{7} Professional Football (Soccer) player	Son: Lee Si-an (Daebak-i.e.); DOB: November 14, 2014 (age 11)	Lee Soo-jin; Housewife/former Miss Korea contestant	Songdo, Incheon, South Korea
2017, 2019–2020; Ep 195, 273–274, 279, 283 (special appearances); 286–355 (regular)	Hong Kyung-min; Singer/Actor	Daughter: Hong Ra-won; DOB: April 21, 2016 (age 10)	Kim Yuna; Haegeum Musician	Seoul, South Korea
2017, 2019–2020; Ep 195, 273–274, 279, 283 (special appearances); 286–355 (regular)	Hong Kyung-min; Singer/Actor	Daughter: Hong Ra-im; DOB: January 1, 2019 (age 7 years)	Kim Yuna; Haegeum Musician	Seoul, South Korea
2020; Ep 315–362	Kang Gary; Rapper	Son: Kang Ha-oh; DOB: October 15, 2017 (age 8)	Kim Se-eun; Unknown	Jayang, Gwangjin, Seoul, South Korea
2014; Ep 32–39; 2019–2021; Ep 307–378	Do Kyung-wan; News Anchor	Son: Do Yeon-woo (Kkom-kkomi); DOB: June 13, 2014 (age 12)	Jang Yoon-jung; Trot Singer	Seoul, South Korea
2014; Ep 32–39; 2019–2021; Ep 307–378	Do Kyung-wan; News Anchor	Daughter: Do Ha-young; DOB: November 9, 2018 (age 7)	Jang Yoon-jung; Trot Singer	Seoul, South Korea
2020; Ep 339,344-349,353,356,359	Lee Chun-soo; Former Soccer Player	Daughter: Lee Joo-eun; DOB:June 21, 2013 (age 13)	Shim Ha-eun	TBA, South Korea
2020; Ep 339,344-349,353,356,359	Lee Chun-soo; Former Soccer Player	Son: Lee Tae-kang; DOB: January 11, 2020 (age 6) (fraternal twin)	Shim Ha-eun	TBA, South Korea
2020; Ep 339,344-349,353,356,359	Lee Chun-soo; Former Soccer Player	Daughter: Lee Joo-yul; DOB: January 11, 2020 (age 6) (fraternal twin)	Shim Ha-eun	TBA, South Korea
2021; Ep 366-394	Yoon Sang-hyun; Actor	Daughter: Yoon Na-gyeom; DOB: December 4, 2015 (age 10)	Maybee; Singer, lyricist, actress and radio presenter	Gimpo, South Korea
2021; Ep 366-394	Yoon Sang-hyun; Actor	Daughter: Yoon Na-on; DOB: May 21, 2017 (age 9)	Maybee; Singer, lyricist, actress and radio presenter	Gimpo, South Korea
2021; Ep 366-394	Yoon Sang-hyun; Actor	Son: Yoon Hee-sung; DOB:December 24, 2018 (age 7)	Maybee; Singer, lyricist, actress and radio presenter	Gimpo, South Korea
2016–2022; Ep 154–413	(Australia) Sam Hammington; Television Personality	Son: William Hammington (Jung Tae-oh); DOB: July 12, 2016 (age 10)	Jung Yu-mi; Housewife, Former Cafe Owner, Former Stylist	Eungam, Eunpyeong, Seoul, South Korea
2016–2022; Ep 154–413	(Australia) Sam Hammington; Television Personality	Son: Bentley Hammington (Jung Woo-sung); DOB: November 8, 2017 (age 8)	Jung Yu-mi; Housewife, Former Cafe Owner, Former Stylist	Eungam, Eunpyeong, Seoul, South Korea
2018, 2020–2022; Ep 213–214, 337, 339-415	Park Hyun-bin; Trot singer	Son: Park Ha-joon; DOB: May 11, 2017 (age 9)	Kim Joo-hee; University Student/Housewife	Seoul, South Korea
2018, 2020–2022; Ep 213–214, 337, 339-415	Park Hyun-bin; Trot singer	Daughter: Park Ha-yeon; DOB: November 15, 2019 (age 6)	Kim Joo-hee; University Student/Housewife	Seoul, South Korea
2022- Ep 417,425-426	Baek Sung-hyun; Actor	Daughter: Baek Seo-yoon; DOB: October 31, 2020 (age 5)	Cho Da-bom; Housewife	TBA
2021–2022; Ep 404-433	Kim Tae-kyun; Baseball player	Daughter: Kim Hyo-rin	Kim Seok-ryu; Former TV announcer	TBA, South Korea
2021–2022; Ep 404-433	Kim Tae-kyun; Baseball player	Daughter: Kim Ha-rin	Kim Seok-ryu; Former TV announcer	TBA, South Korea
2021–2023; Ep 338-461	Shin Hyun-joon; Actor	Son: Shin Min-joon; DOB: April 4, 2016 (age 10)	Kim Kyung-mi; Non-celebrity Cellist	TBA, South Korea
2021–2023; Ep 338-461	Shin Hyun-joon; Actor	Son: Shin Ye-joon; DOB: June 24, 2018 (age 8)	Kim Kyung-mi; Non-celebrity Cellist	TBA, South Korea
2021–2023; Ep 338-461	Shin Hyun-joon; Actor	Daughter: Shin Min-seo; DOB: May 13, 2021 (age 5)	Kim Kyung-mi; Non-celebrity Cellist	TBA, South Korea
2022–2023; Ep 427–483	Kim Dong-hyun; Mixed martial artist, TV personality	Son: Kim Dan-woo; DOB: September 8, 2019 (age 6)	Song Ha-yul; Housewife	Yongsan, Seoul
2022–2023; Ep 427–483	Kim Dong-hyun; Mixed martial artist, TV personality	Daughter: Kim Yeon-woo; DOB: January 6, 2021 (age 5)	Song Ha-yul; Housewife	Yongsan, Seoul
2023–2024; Ep 473–508	Kang Kyung-joon; Actor	Son: Kang Jung-an; DOB: April 2, 2007 (age 19)	Jang Shin-young; Actress	Seoul, South Korea
2023–2024; Ep 473–508	Kang Kyung-joon; Actor	Son: Kang Jung-woo; DOB: September 29, 2019 (age 6)	Jang Shin-young; Actress	Seoul, South Korea
2023–2024; Ep 498–509	Lee Pil-mo; Actor	Son: Lee Dam-ho; DOB: August 14, 2019 (age 6)	Seo Soo-yeon; Interior Designer	TBA, South Korea
2023–2024; Ep 498–509	Lee Pil-mo; Actor	Son: Lee Do-ho; DOB: August 15, 2022 (age 3)	Seo Soo-yeon; Interior Designer	TBA, South Korea
2018–2024; Ep 239–314 (took hiatus from ep 315–352); Ep 353–519	Park Joo-ho; Professional Football (Soccer) player	Daughter: Park Na-eun (Eden); DOB: May 11, 2015 (age 11)	(Switzerland) Anna; Housewife	Suwon, South Korea
2018–2024; Ep 239–314 (took hiatus from ep 315–352); Ep 353–519	Park Joo-ho; Professional Football (Soccer) player	Son: Park Gun-hoo (Aciel); DOB: August 21, 2017 (age 8)	(Switzerland) Anna; Housewife	Suwon, South Korea
2018–2024; Ep 239–314 (took hiatus from ep 315–352); Ep 353–519	Park Joo-ho; Professional Football (Soccer) player	Son: Park Jin-woo (Élyséen); DOB:January 13, 2020 (age 6)	(Switzerland) Anna; Housewife	Suwon, South Korea
2019–2020, 2024; Ep 281–342, 517–535	Moon Hee-joon; Television Personality/Former Idol-Singer	Daughter: Moon Hee-yul (Jam Jam); DOB: May 12, 2017 (age 9)	Soyul; Former Idol-Singer	Hannam, Yongsan, Seoul, South Korea
2019–2020, 2024; Ep 281–342, 517–535	Moon Hee-joon; Television Personality/Former Idol-Singer	Son: Moon Hee-woo (Ppo Ppo); DOB: September 7, 2022 (age 3)	Soyul; Former Idol-Singer	Hannam, Yongsan, Seoul, South Korea
2024; Ep 520-543	Choi Min-hwan; F.T. Island member	Son: Choi Jae-yul; DOB: May 12, 2018 (age 8)	Yul-hee; Former idol	Seoul, South Korea
2024; Ep 520-543	Choi Min-hwan; F.T. Island member	Daughter: Choi Ah-yoon; DOB: February 11, 2020 (age 6) (fraternal twin)	Yul-hee; Former idol	Seoul, South Korea
2024; Ep 520-543	Choi Min-hwan; F.T. Island member	Daughter: Choi Ah-rin; DOB:February 11, 2020 (age 6) (fraternal twin)	Yul-hee; Former idol	Seoul, South Korea
2022–2024; Ep 440–544	Jasson (Yeon Je-seung); Interior Designer, TV Personality	Son: Yeon Jun-beom; DOB: August 5, 2022 (age 3)	Hong Hyun-hee; TV Personality	Seoul, South Korea

Former Mother(s)

Duration	Dad	Children	Mom/Wife	Filming location
2021–2023; Ep 380–490	—N/a	Son: Zen Fujita (Sa Jeonseong); DOB: November 4, 2020 (age 5)	Sayuri Fujita; Television Personality	TBA, South Korea
2024; Ep	Jo Seong-hwan	Son: Jo Jae-woon; Born 2008	Jung Mi-ae; Trot singer	TBA, South Korea
2024; Ep	Jo Seong-hwan	Son: Jo In-seong; Born 2016	Jung Mi-ae; Trot singer	TBA, South Korea
2024; Ep	Jo Seong-hwan	Daughter: Jo Ah-yeong; Born 2018	Jung Mi-ae; Trot singer	TBA, South Korea
2024; Ep	Jo Seong-hwan	Son: Jo Seung-woo; Born 2020	Jung Mi-ae; Trot singer	TBA, South Korea

Former Uncle(s)

Duration	Uncle	Children	Filming location
2024; Ep 524–546	DinDin; Rapper, Producer, TV Personality, Radio Personality	Nephew: (Italy) (South Korea) Niccolò Eugene Nannini; DOB: March 3, 2021 (age 5)	TBA, South Korea

Former Narrator(s)

	Duration	Narrator
2013; Chuseok Special Part 1–2	Yoo Ho-jeong	
2013–2014; Ep 1–27	Chae Sira	
2014; Ep 28–37	Shin Ae-ra	
2014–2015; Ep 38–59	Heo Su-gyeong^{4}	
2015; Ep 93	Yoona of Girls' Generation	
2015; Ep 96	Yoo In-na	
2015; Ep 97	Jang Hyun-sung	
2017; Ep 185–188	Kim Hyo-Jin	
2015–2018; Ep 60–226	Jung Hye-young^{6}	
2018; Episode 227–233	Oh Sang-jin; Kim So-young	
2018; Episode 234–249	Do Kyung-wan; Jang Yun-jeong	
2018–2019; Episode 253–255, 258–272	Lee Su-ji	
2019; Episode 273–306	Han Chae-ah	
2019–2020; Episode 307–340	Lee Mi-do	
2018–2021; Episode 253–256, 258–362	Do Kyung-wan	
2021; Episode 363–382	HaHa	
2021; Episode 383, 385-401	Park Sol-mi	
2021; Episode 384	Yoo Se-yoon	
2021; Episode 402	Ko Young-bae (Soran)	
2021; Episode 403	Hwang Jae-seong	
2021–2023; Episode 404-405, 408–478	Yuk Jung-wan	
2021; Episode 406	Lee Hwi-jae	
2021; Episode 407	Gary	
2022; Episode 443	Jasson	
2023; Episode 473	Jang Shin-young	
2023; Episode 476	Song Il-kook	
2023; Episode 479	Nucksal	
2023; Episode 480-481	Lee Seok-hoon	
2023; Episode 482-484	Sunye	
2023; Episode 485	Honey J	
2023; Episode 486	Gree	
2023; Episode 498	Seo Soo-yeon	
2023; Episode 500	Kim Ho-young	
2023; Episode 504	Kim Hae-sook	
2023; Episode 506	Park Na-eun (Park Joo-ho's daughter)	
2023, 2024; Episode 485, 510	Honey J	
2024; Episode 511	Insooni of Golden Girls	
2024; Episode 513	Jang Dong-min	
2023–2024; Episode 487–515	TVXQ Changmin	
2024; Episode 516-519, 521	Kang So-ra	
2020–2024; Episode 341–529	So Yoo-jin	

^Note 1:First appearance on episode 20 & 21. Officially joined cast starting episode 25.

^Note 2:Kim Jung-tae's younger son Kim Si-hyun, who was only 2 months old when they started filming for the show will not be part of the show.
^Note 3:See "Controversies" section.
^Note 4:Heo Su-gyeong previously guest starred with her daughter Byeol on episode 24 during Lee Hwi-jae's segment.
^Note 5:Song Il-kook wife Jeong Seung-yeon face is blurred whenever she appears on the show to protect her identity due to her occupation as a High Court Judge. She also does not participate in the talking head interviews like the other Moms/Wives of other cast families.
^Note 6:Jung Hye-young's husband Sean from Jinusean previously appeared in numerous episodes of the show during former cast member Tablo and Haru's segment. Also all four of her children along with her husband appeared on episode 52 during Song Il-kook's segment.
^Note 7:Lee Dong-gook previously guest starred on episode 40 during Lee Hwi-jae's segment.

^Note 8:Lee Hwi-jae and his family moved back to Seoul, shown on episode 175 in order to be closer to his ailing father who is suffering from dementia.

=== Special cast ===
Special cast

Duration	Dad	Children	Mom/Wife	Filming location
2017; Ep 184	(United States) Robert Kelly; University Professor/Political Analyst	Daughter: Marion Kelly (Ye-na); DOB: March 9, 2013 (age 13)	Kim Jung-a; Housewife/former Yoga Instructor	Busan, South Korea
2017; Ep 184	(United States) Robert Kelly; University Professor/Political Analyst	Son: James Kelly (Yu-seop); DOB: June 29, 2016 (age 10)	Kim Jung-a; Housewife/former Yoga Instructor	Busan, South Korea
2017; Ep 185–186	Park Gun-hyung; Actor	Son: Park Yi-jun; DOB: June 10, 2015 (age 11)	Lee Chae-rim; Office Worker	Seoul, South Korea
2017; Ep 191–192	Outsider; Rapper/Songwriter	Daughter: Shin-Yi Ro-woon; DOB: March 4, 2016 (age 10)	Lee Young-bin; Dance Director	Ilsan, Gyeonggi-do, South Korea
2016; Ep 130-162 (regular); Ep 194 (special appearances)	In Gyo-jin; Actor	Daughter: In Ha-eun; DOB: December 4, 2015 (age 10)	So Yi-hyun; Actress	Namyang-ju, Gyeonggi-do, South Korea
2017; Ep 202–204	Viktor Ahn; Short-track Speed-skater Athlete	Daughter: Jane Ahn; DOB: December 29, 2015 (age 10)	Woo Na-ri; Housewife	Moscow, Russia
2018; Ep 224–225, 239 (special appearances)	Moon Sung-min; Volleyball Player	Son: Moon Si-ho; DOB: February 9, 2016 (age 10)	Park Jin-ah; Housewife/Former Model	Hwaseong-si, Gyeonggi-do, South Korea
2018; Ep 224–225, 239 (special appearances)	Moon Sung-min; Volleyball Player	Son: Moon Ri-ho; DOB: January 16, 2018 (age 8)	Park Jin-ah; Housewife/Former Model	Hwaseong-si, Gyeonggi-do, South Korea
2018; Ep 227–228	Jo Jung-chi; Musician	Daughter: Jo Eun-Yi; DOB: February 28, 2017 (age 9)	Choi Jung-in; Singer	Seoul, South Korea
2018; Ep 231–232	Kang Hyung-wook; Businessman/Certified Dog Trainer	Son: Kang Ju-woon; DOB: November 20, 2017 (age 8)	(United States) Susan Elder; Housewife	Seoul, South Korea
2018; Ep 235–236	Yang Joon-mu; Businessman	Son: Yang No-ah; DOB: October 3, 2016 (age 9)	Kahi; Former Idol-Singer	Seoul, South Korea
2018; Ep 235–236	Yang Joon-mu; Businessman	Son: Yang Si-ohn; DOB:June 16, 2018 (age 8)	Kahi; Former Idol-Singer	Seoul, South Korea
2018; Ep 252–253, 266-267	Jo Sung-mo; Singer	Son: Jo Bong-yeon; DOB: October 25, 2015 (age 10)	Goo Min-ji; Former Model/Designer	Seoul, South Korea
2019; Ep 264, 269, 272, 277	Shim Ji-ho; Actor	Son: Shim Yi-an; DOB: May 20, 2014 (age 12)	Han Ga-in; Housewife/Graduate University Student	Seoul, South Korea
2019; Ep 264, 269, 272, 277	Shim Ji-ho; Actor	Daughter: Shim Yi-el; DOB: November 21, 2017 (age 8)	Han Ga-in; Housewife/Graduate University Student	Seoul, South Korea
2019; Ep 278	Kim Da-hyun; Actor and singer	Son: Kim Yi-deun	Kim Mi-kyung	TBA, South Korea
2019; Ep 278	Kim Da-hyun; Actor and singer	Son: Kim Yi-bit	Kim Mi-kyung	TBA, South Korea
2019; Ep 278	Kim Da-hyun; Actor and singer	Daughter: Kim Yi-peul	Kim Mi-kyung	TBA, South Korea
2019; Ep 282	Park Jeong-cheol; Actor	Daughter: Park Da-in	Name unknown Flight Attendant	TBA, South Korea
2019–2020; Ep 318, 335	Lee Sang-joon; Office worker	Son: Lee Do-hyung; DOB: August 22, 2018 (age 7)	Lee Mi-do; Actress	Seoul, South Korea
2020; Ep 317	Han Suk-joon; Television personality and former announcer.	Daughter: Han Sa-bin; DOB: October 2, 2018 (age 7)	Name unknown Photographer	TBA, South Korea
2020; Ep 320	Kim In-suk; Comedian	Son: Kim Tae-yang	Angela Park	TBA, South Korea
2020; Ep 320	Kim In-suk; Comedian	Son: Kim Tae-san	Angela Park	TBA, South Korea
2020; Ep 321-322, 365, 368	Kim Young-gwon; Professional Football (Soccer) player	Daughter: Kim Li-a; DOB: September 6, 2015 (age 10)	Park Se-jin	TBA, South Korea
2020; Ep 321-322, 365, 368	Kim Young-gwon; Professional Football (Soccer) player	Son: Kim Li-hyun	Park Se-jin	TBA, South Korea
2020; Ep 321-322, 365, 368	Kim Young-gwon; Professional Football (Soccer) player	Son: Kim Li-jae; DOB: December 29, 2020 (age 5)	Park Se-jin	TBA, South Korea
2020; Ep 324, 326, 331	Min Woo-hyuk; Actor	Son: Park Yi-deun; DOB: January 23, 2015 (age 11)	Lee Se-mi	TBA, South Korea
2020; Ep 324, 326, 331	Min Woo-hyuk; Actor	Daughter: Park Yi-eum; DOB: March 6, 2020 (age 6)	Lee Se-mi	TBA, South Korea
2021; Ep 397, 398	Jung Myung-ho; Former Baseball Player	Daughter: Jung Jo-ie; DOB: June 5, 2020 (age 6)	Seo Hyo-rim; Actress	TBA, South Korea
2021; Ep 397-398	Kim Byung-hyun; Former baseball player	Daughter: Kim Min-ju	Han Kyung-min	TBA, South Korea
2021; Ep 397-398	Kim Byung-hyun; Former baseball player	Son: Kim Tae-yoon	Han Kyung-min	TBA, South Korea
2021; Ep 397-398	Kim Byung-hyun; Former baseball player	Son: Kim Joo-sung	Han Kyung-min	TBA, South Korea
2021; Ep 399-400	Paik Jong-won; Chef	Son: Paik Yong-hee; DOB:April 9, 2014 (age 12)	So Yoo-jin; Actress	TBA, South Korea
2021; Ep 399-400	Paik Jong-won; Chef	Daughter: Paik Seo-hyun; DOB: September 21, 2015 (age 10)	So Yoo-jin; Actress	TBA, South Korea
2021; Ep 399-400	Paik Jong-won; Chef	Daughter: Paik Se-eun; DOB: February 8, 2017 (age 9)	So Yoo-jin; Actress	TBA, South Korea
2021; Ep 401, 402, 405, 407, 409, 411, 415	Jo Chang-wook; Dentist	Son: Jo Eui-jin	Yang Ji-eun; Trot singer	TBA, South Korea
2021; Ep 401, 402, 405, 407, 409, 411, 415	Jo Chang-wook; Dentist	Daughter: Jo Eui-yeon	Yang Ji-eun; Trot singer	TBA, South Korea
2021; Ep 403	—N/a	Daughter: Cho Hye-eun	Lee Young-hyun; Big Mama member	TBA, South Korea
2021; Ep 408	Kim Jin-woo; Actor	Daughter: Kim Dan-hee	Non-celebrity wife	TBA, South Korea
2021; Ep 408	Kim Jin-woo; Actor	Son: Kim Moon-ho	Non-celebrity wife	TBA, South Korea
2022; Ep 413	Kim Jong-boo	Son: Kim Do-yoon; DOB: December 4, 2015 (age 10)	Jung Joo-ri; Comedienne	TBA, South Korea
2022; Ep 413	Kim Jong-boo	Son: Kim Do-won; DOB: September 29, 2017 (age 8)	Jung Joo-ri; Comedienne	TBA, South Korea
2022; Ep 413	Kim Jong-boo	Son: Kim Do-ha; DOB: March 22, 2019 (age 7)	Jung Joo-ri; Comedienne	TBA, South Korea
2022; Ep 418	Kang Min-ho; Baseball player	Daughter: Kang Ha-yi; DOB: June 23, 2017 (age 9)	Shin So-yeon; Former TV announcer	TBA, South Korea
2022; Ep 418	Kang Min-ho; Baseball player	Son: Kang Yi-han; DOB: August 16, 2019 (age 6)	Shin So-yeon; Former TV announcer	TBA, South Korea
2022; Ep 418	Kang Min-ho; Baseball player	Son: Kang Yi-joon; DOB: March 22, 2021 (age 5)	Shin So-yeon; Former TV announcer	TBA, South Korea
2022; Ep 413	Chon Tae-pung; Basketball coach	Son: Chon Tae-yong	Mina Turner; Housewife	TBA, South Korea
2022; Ep 413	Chon Tae-pung; Basketball coach	Daughter: Chon Ha-neul	Mina Turner; Housewife	TBA, South Korea
2022; Ep 413	Chon Tae-pung; Basketball coach	Son: Chon Tae-yang	Mina Turner; Housewife	TBA, South Korea
2023; Ep 480	Song Jin-woo; Actor	Daughter: Song Umi; DOB: May 28, 2019 (age 7)	Minami; Housewife	TBA, South Korea
2023; Ep 480	Song Jin-woo; Actor	Son: Song Haru; DOB: November 2, 2022 (age 3)	Minami; Housewife	TBA, South Korea
2023; Ep 491,496	Choi Phillip; Actor	Daughter: Choi Do-yeon; DOB: June 18, 2019 (age 7)	Kwon Eun-hye; Housewife	TBA, South Korea
2023; Ep 491,496	Choi Phillip; Actor	Son: Choi Do-woon; DOB: February 16, 2022 (age 4)	Kwon Eun-hye; Housewife	TBA, South Korea
2023; Ep 486, 490, 495, 497, 502, 514	Jung Sung-ho; Comedian	Daughter: Jung Soo-a; DOB: June 5, 2010 (age 16)	Kyung Marg-eum; Housewife	TBA, South Korea
2023; Ep 486, 490, 495, 497, 502, 514	Jung Sung-ho; Comedian	Daughter: Jung Soo-ae; DOB: March 7, 2012 (age 14)	Kyung Marg-eum; Housewife	TBA, South Korea
2023; Ep 486, 490, 495, 497, 502, 514	Jung Sung-ho; Comedian	Son: Jung Soo-hyun; DOB: March 7, 2013 (age 13)	Kyung Marg-eum; Housewife	TBA, South Korea
2023; Ep 486, 490, 495, 497, 502, 514	Jung Sung-ho; Comedian	Son: Jung Jae-bum; DOB: August 22, 2014 (age 11)	Kyung Marg-eum; Housewife	TBA, South Korea
2023; Ep 486, 490, 495, 497, 502, 514	Jung Sung-ho; Comedian	Son: Jung Ha-neul; DOB: December 18, 2022 (age 3)	Kyung Marg-eum; Housewife	TBA, South Korea
2024; Ep 516, 519	Jo Hyeon-woo; Professional Football (Soccer) player	Daughter: Jo Ha-rin	Lee Hee-young; Housewife	TBA, South Korea
2024; Ep 516, 519	Jo Hyeon-woo; Professional Football (Soccer) player	Daughter: Jo Ye-rin	Lee Hee-young; Housewife	TBA, South Korea
2024; Ep 510, 511, 513, 515, 520, 527	Jung Dam; Model	Daughter: Jung Love; DOB: April 5, 2023 (age 3)	Honey J Dancer	TBA, South Korea
2024; Ep 522, 532	BewhY; Rapper	Daughter: Lee Si-ha DOB: January 13, 2023 (age 3)	Unknown	TBA, South Korea
2024; Ep 529, 549	Kim Geon-tae; Entrepreneur	Daughter: Kim Lu-a DOB: September 7, 2020 (age 5)	Bada; Singer	TBA, South Korea
2025; Ep 555	Kang Jae-jun; Comedian	Son: Kang Hyun-jo DOB: August 6, 2024 (age 23 months)	Lee Eun-hyung; Comedienne	TBA, South Korea
2025; Ep 560	Go Woo-seok; Art Director	Daughter: Go Ah-ri DOB: April 8, 2015 (age 11)	Song Seon-mi; Actress	TBA, South Korea
2025; Ep 564, 566	Oh Jong-hyuk; Singer	Daughter: Oh Ro-sie DOB: July 7, 2022 (age 4)	Park Hae-soo; Housewive	TBA, South Korea
2025; Ep 581, 584	Park Chung-hyuk; Office worker	Daughter: Park Chae-yu DOB: July 27, 2023 (age 3)	Kang Hye-jin (Hey Jini); Content creators	TBA, South Korea
2025; Ep 581, 584	Park Chung-hyuk; Office worker	Son: Park Seung-yu (Popo) DOB: July 10, 2025 (age 12 months)	Kang Hye-jin (Hey Jini); Content creators	TBA, South Korea
2025; Ep	Shim Hyung-tak; Actor	Son: Shim Ha-ru DOB: January 15, 2025 (age 18 months)	Saya Hirai; Housewife	TBA, South Korea
2025; Ep 586	Choi Woo-sung; Businessman	Daughter: Choi Hee-seo (Ella) DOB: July 7, 2024 (age 2)	Kim Yoon-ji; Singer	TBA, South Korea

=== Cast history ===
- Lee Hyun-woo could not participate in the show when it was picked up on Happy Sunday due to conflicting schedule.
- Yoo Ho-jeong was the original narrator for episodes 1 and 2 of the Chuseok Special, there was no narrator for episode 3 of the special episodes.
- Tablo and his daughter Haru joined the cast starting from episode 1 of season 1 to replace Lee Hyun-woo's spot.
- Chae Sira became the narrator starting from season 1, her last episode was the 27th. Chae decided to leave the show due to her conflicting schedule.
- Kim Jung-tae and his son Ji-hoo (Yakkung) guest starred on episodes 20 and 21 as part of Jang Hyun-sung's segment, the two were invited to officially join the cast because of the show's extended time slot.
- Shin Ae-ra took over as narrator starting from episode 28. She was approached to join the show because of her reputation as a caring mother in real life.
- Kim Jung-tae and his son Yakkung opted to leave the show following controversy of them attending a campaign rally for a local politician. Episode 31 is their last.
- Jang Yoon-jung and Do Kyung-wan will be guest cast from episode 32. They will fill the spot left open by the departure of Kim Jung-tae and his son Yakkung. The couple will chronicle the birth of their son.
- Jang Hyun-sung's agency announced on June 24, 2014, that the actor and his sons would be leaving the show due to conflicting schedule with filming his drama Ceci Bon and movie Love Wins. He and his family last appearance is episode 33.
- Song Il-kook was announced on June 25, 2014, to be joining the cast of Superman along with his triplet sons. Their first episode will air on July 6.
- It was announced on July 20 that Shin Ae-ra would be stepping down as the narrator of the show to concentrate on her studies in the United States. Her last episode will be the 37th. Heo Su-gyeong, who previously guest starred on the show will be taking over as the narrator.
- On December 1, 2014, Tablo and his daughter Haru announced that both will be leaving the show due to Tablo's conflicting schedule with promoting his music career and filming the show. Episode 58 will be their last.
- Actor Uhm Tae-woong was announced on December 1, 2014, to be joining the show with his daughter Uhm Ji-on. The new father/daughter duo will be taking the place of exiting cast family Tablo and Haru.
- A press release was issued on January 6, 2015, announcing actress and wife of Sean from Jinusean, Jung Hye-young as the narrator of the show starting from episode 60. No reason was given for the exiting of most current narrator Heo Su-gyeong.
- On July 13, 2015, KBS confirmed professional soccer player Lee Dong-gook will be joining the cast part-time with his five children.
- On October 14, 2015, the shows PD Kang Bong Kyu, confirmed that actor Uhm Tae-woong and his family will be leaving the show so that he and his wife can concentrate on the main careers as an actor and ballerina. When Uhm Tae-woong's wife Yoon Hye-jin, appeared on the variety show "Taxi" in November 2015 she further clarified another reason was that they didn't want Jion growing up in the spotlight thinking she was privileged.
- On December 21, 2015, KBS announced that Song Il-gook and the triplets will be leaving the show for an undisclosed reason. Episode 116 will be their last.
- On December 9, 2015, the PDs of the show confirmed that actor Ki Tae Young had started filming for show. His family replaces Uhm Tae Woong's who had recently left the show.
- On January 27, 2016, it was confirmed that actor Lee Beom-soo would be joining the show. His family will be taking over the slot of Song Il-gook's family after they leave the show sometime in February.
- In later February 2016 an insider informed the media that Choo Sung Hoon and his daughter Sarang would be leaving the show. PD of the show did not confirm the news because Choo and his family did not finish filming yet. On February 28, 2016, it was confirmed the Choos will be leaving the show after Sung Hoon's wife Shiho Yano posted an invite for fans to attend their final filming on her Instagram account. The Choos last episode will air in late March 2016. With Choo Sung Hoon leaving the show, Lee Hwi Jae remains the only original cast member since the show premiered.
- On April 22, 2016, KBS revealed that actors Oh Ji-ho, In Gyo-jin and Yang Dong-geun and their respective children would be joining the show. Yang Dong-geun's first episode will be on Episode 127 while Oh Ji-ho and In Gyo-jin's will be on Episode 129 and 130 respectively.
- In October 2016, it was announced that Sam Hammington and his son William would be joining the show. Their first episode will be on Episode 154.
- In November 2016, it was revealed that singer Ko Ji-young would be joining the show. Their first episode will be on Episode 163.
- On May 10, 2017, it was announced that actor Lee Beom-soo and his kids would be leaving the show in order for Lee to focus on directing his film. Episode 182 will be their last. Lee had originally joined the program as a way to spend time with his children while he recovered from his leg injury.
- During the previews at the end of episode 183, Professor Robert Kelly of Pusan National University were shown as the new family joining the show. The Kelly family rose to popularity when his young children crashed his live interview with the BBC and the video of the incident went viral.
- On October 3, 2019, Lee Dong Guk's wife posted on social media announcing her family's departure from the program.
- On January 19, 2020, broadcast, Park Joo Ho announces his family will take a hiatus from the program in order to take care of his wife Anna's delivery of their third child in Switzerland, born on January 13, 2020.
- On February 2, 2020, broadcast, Kang Gary and his son Kang Ha-Oh first joined the show. Kang Gary returned to entertainment after 3 years hiatus.
- On April 6, 2020, broadcast, it was revealed that actor, singer, model Min Woo-hyuk and his son Park Yi-deun would be joining the show. The first episode will be on Episode 324.

== Un-aired X-files ==
The X-files are film clips that didn't make it to broadcast on the regular program. These clips can be seen on Korean paid subscription web streaming site Cable TV VOD. The clips are narrated by different guests each time, such as Lee Hye-ri from Korean girls idol group Girl's Day.

== Sponsors ==
LG is the main sponsor of the show. All the "Superman" families prominently display or use the LG's S Homeboy tablet made by Samsung throughout each episode. Besides the S Homeboy tablet, each Superman family use or display products they individually endorse on the show.

NOTE: These are only products shown on the show. Not a complete list of each cast member endorsements.

- Jang Hyun-sung
  - Tommy Hilfiger Kids
- Lee Hwi-jae
  - Huggies diaper
  - Fedora baby stroller
  - Manduca baby carriers
  - allo&lugh children's clothing
  - MOLDIR
  - DAKS Accessories
  - Finden Bebe
  - Lotte Card
  - Babience
  - MoiMoi Kamppi
- Choo Sung-hoon
  - Jimy's Charmer lifestyle brand
  - allo&lugh children's clothing
  - Seoul Milk yogurt
  - DreamB Kidsmat
  - New Balance
  - Del Monte Fruit
- Tablo
  - Black Yak clothing
  - MOLDIR
- Song Il Gook
  - Samsung Electronic
  - DUOLAC
  - Skärbarn
  - Hana Financial Group
  - CARNIVAL|Limousine
  - Minute Maid
  - LG Aircon
- Lee Dong-gook
  - Adidas

== International version ==
In April 2014, China's Zhejiang Television (ZJTV) began airing a Chinese version of The Return of Superman called Dad is Back starring former Taiwanese boy band Fahrenheit member Wu Chun, film producer Zhong Lei Wang, actor Jia Nailiang, and former gymnast Li Xiapeng. The show is in collaboration with the producers of the Korean KBS version and follows the same concept as the Korean version with the exception of a narrator. The title of the Chinese version was renamed in order to clear up plagiarism rumors. In March 2017, Thailand Channel 7 began airing a Thai version of The Return of Superman called The Return of Superman Thailand. In April 2022, Viettel began airing a Vietnamese version of The Return of Superman called "MẸ VẮNG NHÀ BA LÀ SIÊU NHÂN".

== Awards and nominations ==
Year	Award	Category	Recipient	Result	Ref.
2013	12th KBS Entertainment Awards	Top Entertainer Award	Choo Sung-hoon	Won	
2013	12th KBS Entertainment Awards	Best Male Newcomer in a Variety Show	Jang Hyun-sung	Nominated	
2013	12th KBS Entertainment Awards	Producer's Special Award	Lee Hwi-jae	Won	
2013	12th KBS Entertainment Awards	Excellence Award, Male Entertainer in a Variety Show	Choo Sung-hoon	Nominated	
2013	12th KBS Entertainment Awards	Excellence Award, Male Entertainer in a Variety Show	Tablo	Nominated	
2013	12th KBS Entertainment Awards	Top Excellence Award, Male Entertainer in a Variety Show	Choo Sung-hoon	Nominated	
2013	12th KBS Entertainment Awards	Top Excellence Award, Male Entertainer in a Variety Show	Tablo	Nominated	
2013	12th KBS Entertainment Awards	Mobile TV Popularity Award	Choo Sa-rang, Jang Jun-woo & Jun-seo, Lee Haru, Lee Seo-eon & Seo-jun	Won	
2013	12th KBS Entertainment Awards	Viewer's Choice Program of the Year	The Return of Superman	Nominated	
2013	12th KBS Entertainment Awards	Best Eater	Choo Sarang	Nominated	
2014	50th Paeksang Arts Awards	Best Entertainment Program	The Return of Superman	Nominated	
2014	13th KBS Entertainment Awards	Viewer's Choice Program of the Year	The Return of Superman	Won	
2014	13th KBS Entertainment Awards	Top Excellence Award, Male Entertainer in a Variety Show	Choo Sung-hoon	Won	
2014	13th KBS Entertainment Awards	Producer's Special Award	Lee Hwi-jae	Won	
2014	13th KBS Entertainment Awards	Producer's Special Award	Song Il-gook	Won	
2014	13th KBS Entertainment Awards	Mobile TV Popularity Award	Choo Sa-rang, Lee Haru, Lee Seo-eon & Seo-jun, Song Dae-han, Min-guk & Man-se	Won	
2014	13th KBS Entertainment Awards	Best Scriptwriter	Kim Jung-sun	Won	
2015	51st Paeksang Arts Awards	Best Entertainment Program	The Return of Superman	Nominated	
2015	14th KBS Entertainment Awards	Viewer's Choice Program of the Year	The Return of Superman	Nominated	
2015	14th KBS Entertainment Awards	Male MC Newcomer Award	Lee Dong-gook	Nominated	
2015	14th KBS Entertainment Awards	Best Entertainer – Entertainment Category	Lee Dong-gook	Won	
2015	14th KBS Entertainment Awards	Hot Issue – Variety Show Star Award	Choo Sung-hoon	Won	
2015	14th KBS Entertainment Awards	Excellence Award – Male Variety Category	Song Il-gook	Won	
2015	14th KBS Entertainment Awards	Grand Prize (Daesang)	Lee Hwi-jae	Won	
2016	15th KBS Entertainment Awards	Viewer's Choice Program of the Year	The Return of Superman	Nominated	
2016	15th KBS Entertainment Awards	Mobile TV Popularity Award	Lee So-eul & Da-eul, Lee Seo-eon & Seo-jun, Lee Jae-si, Jae-ah, Soo-ah, Seol-ah & Si-an, Kim Ro-Hee, Yang Joy, Oh Seo-heun, In Ha-eun	Won	
2016	15th KBS Entertainment Awards	Excellence Award – Male Variety Category	Ki Tae-young & Lee Beom-soo	Won	
2016	15th KBS Entertainment Awards	Top Excellence Award – Male Variety Category	Lee Dong-gook	Won	
2016	15th KBS Entertainment Awards	Grand Prize (Daesang)	Lee Hwi-jae	Nominated	
2018	16th KBS Entertainment Awards	Mobile TV Popularity Award	Lee Jae-si, Jae-ah, Soo-ah, Seol-ah & Si-an, William Hammington, Bentley Hammington, Ko Seung-jae, Bong Si-ha, Bong Bon-bi, Park Na-eun, Park Geon-hoo	Won	
2018	16th KBS Entertainment Awards	Hot Issue Variety Award	Bong Tae-gyu	Won	
2018	16th KBS Entertainment Awards	Top Excellence Award – Male Variety Category	Sam Hammington	Won	
2018	16th KBS Entertainment Awards	Excellence Award – Male Variety Category	Ko Ji-yong	Won	
2018	16th KBS Entertainment Awards	Grand Prize (Daesang)	Lee Dong-gook	Nominated	
2019	17th KBS Entertainment Awards	Best Icon Award	William Hammington, Bentley Hammington, Park Na-eun, Park Geon-hoo, Moon Hee-yul, Hong Ra-won, Hong Ra-im, Do Yeon-woo, Do Ha-young	Won	
2019	17th KBS Entertainment Awards	Broadcasting Screenwriter Award	Beak Sun-young	Won	
2019	17th KBS Entertainment Awards	Viewers' Choice Best Program Award	The Return of Superman	Won	
2019	17th KBS Entertainment Awards	Grand Prize (Daesang)	Sam Hammington, Park Joo-ho, Moon Hee-joon, Hong Kyung-min, Do Kyung-wan	Won	
2019	17th KBS Entertainment Awards	Best Couple Award	Do Kyung-wan, Jang Yoon-jung	Nominated	
2019	17th KBS Entertainment Awards	Excellence Award in Entertainment	Hong Kyung-min	Nominated	
2019	17th KBS Entertainment Awards	Top Excellence Award in Entertainment	Sam Hammington	Nominated	
2019	17th KBS Entertainment Awards	Top Excellence Award in Entertainment	Park Joo-ho	Nominated	
2020	18th KBS Entertainment Awards	Best Icon Award	The Return of Superman children	Won	
2020	18th KBS Entertainment Awards	Viewers' Choice Best Program Award	The Return of Superman	Nominated	
2020	18th KBS Entertainment Awards	Rookie Award (Reality Category)	Lee Chun-soo	Nominated	
2020	18th KBS Entertainment Awards	Best Entertainer Award (Show/Variety Category)	Hong Kyung-min	Won	
2020	18th KBS Entertainment Awards	Top Excellence Award (Reality Category)	Do Kyung-wan	Nominated	
2020	18th KBS Entertainment Awards	Top Excellence Award (Show/Variety Category)	Hong Kyung-min	Nominated	
2020	18th KBS Entertainment Awards	Top Excellence Award (Show/Variety Category)	Jang Yoon-jung	Nominated	
2020	18th KBS Entertainment Awards	Grand Prize (Daesang)	Sam Hammington	Nominated	
2021	19th KBS Entertainment Awards	Best Icon Award	The Return of Superman children	Won	
2021	19th KBS Entertainment Awards	Viewers' Choice Best Program Award	The Return of Superman	Nominated	
2021	19th KBS Entertainment Awards	Best Entertainer Award (Reality Category)	Sayuri Fujita	Won	
2021	19th KBS Entertainment Awards	Excellence Award (Reality Category)	So Yoo-jin	Nominated	
2021	19th KBS Entertainment Awards	Top Excellence Award (Reality Category)	Sayuri Fujita	Nominated	
2021	19th KBS Entertainment Awards	Top Excellence Award (Show/Variety Category)	Jang Yoon-jung	Won	
2021	19th KBS Entertainment Awards	Entertainer of the Year	Park Joo-ho and his family (Na Eun, Gun Hoo, Jin Woo)	Won	
2021	19th KBS Entertainment Awards	Grand Prize (Daesang)	Park Joo-ho and his family (Na Eun, Gun Hoo, Jin Woo)	Nominated	
2022	20th KBS Entertainment Awards	Best Icon Award	The Return of Superman children	Won	
2022	20th KBS Entertainment Awards	Popularity Award	Kim Jun-ho	Won	
2022	20th KBS Entertainment Awards	Best Entertainer Award	Park Joo-ho	Won	
2022	20th KBS Entertainment Awards	Excellence Award (Reality Category)	Jasson	Won	
2022	20th KBS Entertainment Awards	Top Excellence Award (Reality Category)	Sayuri Fujita	Won	
2023	21st KBS Entertainment Awards	Rookie Award (Reality)	Lee Pil-mo	Nominated	
2023	21st KBS Entertainment Awards	Popularity Award	The Return of Superman children	Won	
2023	21st KBS Entertainment Awards	Excellence Award (Reality Category)	Kim Jun-ho	Won	
2023	21st KBS Entertainment Awards	Top Excellence Award (Reality Category)	Jasson	Won	
2024	22nd KBS Entertainment Awards	Best Icon Award	Kim Eun-woo, Kim Jung-woo, Jang Ji-woo, Cho Seung-woo, Cho In-sung, Cho Ah-young, Cho Jae-woon	Won	
2024	22nd KBS Entertainment Awards	Excellence Award (Reality Category)	Park Soo-hong	Won	
2024	22nd KBS Entertainment Awards	Top Excellence Award (Reality Category)	Kim Jun-ho	Won	
2025	23rd KBS Entertainment Awards	Rookie Award (Reality Category)	Shim Hyung-tak & Shim Haru	Won	
2025	23rd KBS Entertainment Awards	Best Icon Award	Kim Eun-woo, Kim Jung-woo, Sim Ha-ru, Jang Ji-woo, Jang Si-woo, Park Seo-bin, Choi Hee-seo, Shin Si-woo, Shin Sian	Won	
2025	23rd KBS Entertainment Awards	Top Excellence Award (Reality)	Kim Jun-ho	Nominated	
2025	23rd KBS Entertainment Awards	Viewers' Choice Best Program Award	The Return of Superman	Nominated	
2025	23rd KBS Entertainment Awards	Entertainer of the Year Award	Kim Jong-min	Won	

== See also ==
- Master in the House
