= 2020 SBS Entertainment Awards =

14th edition of award ceremony

- Date: December 19, 2020
- Site: SBS Prism Tower, Sangam-dong, Mapo-gu, Seoul
- Hosted by: Shin Dong-yup; Cha Eun-woo; Lee Seung-gi

Television coverage
- Network: SBS
- Duration: Approx. 230 minutes
- Viewership: 6.5% (part 1); 6.8% (part 2); 5.5% (part 3)

The 2020 SBS Entertainment Awards presented by Seoul Broadcasting System (SBS), took place on December 19, 2020, at SBS Prism Tower in Sangam-dong, Mapo-gu, Seoul. It was hosted by Shin Dong-yup, Cha Eun-woo, Lee Seung-gi. The nominees were chosen from SBS variety, talk, and comedy shows that aired from December 2019 to November 2020.

== Nominations and winners ==
(Winners denoted in bold)

Grand Prize (Daesang)
**Kim Jong-kook – Running Man and My Little Old Boy**; Yoo Jae-suk; Kim Gu-ra; Seo Jang-hoon; Yang Se-hyung; Lee Seung-gi; Baek Jong-won
Top Excellence in Programming Award	Legendary Special Award
**My Little Old Boy**	**Lee Kyung-sil and Lee Sung-mi – Truth Game**; **Choi Yang-rak and Lee Bong-won – Good Friends**; **Im Sung-hoon – What on Earth!**; **Choi Hwa-jung – Choi Hwa-jung's Power Time**; **Lee Hong-ryul – Lee Hong-ryul Show**
Top Excellence Award in Reality Category	Top Excellence Award in Show/Variety Category
**Lee Sang-min – My Little Old Boy**; **Kim Hee-chul – My Little Old Boy and Delicious Rendezvous**	**Haha – Running Man**; **Jang Yoon-jeong – K-Trot in Town**
Excellence Award in Reality Category	Excellence Award in Show/Variety Category
**Jung In-sun – Baek Jong-won's Alley Restaurant**; **Kim Kwang-kyu** – **Flaming Youth**	**Jang Do-yeon – Park-Jang's LOL**; **Kim Dong-hyun – Master in the House**
Excellence Program Award in Reality Category	Producer Award
**K-Trot in Town**; **Delicious Rendezvous**	**Yang Se-hyung – Delicious Rendezvous and Master in the House**
Rookie Award	Special Award: Scene Stealer Award
**Jessi** – **SBS Mobidic: Showterview with Jessi**; **Cha Eun-woo** – **Master in the House**; **Oh Min-seok** – **My Little Old Boy**	**Tak Jae-hoon – My Little Old Boy**
Special Award: SBS Honorary Employee Award	Special Awards: Public Interest Variety Award
**Seo Jang-hoon** **– My Little Old Boy, Handsome Tigers and Same Bed, Different Dreams 2: You Are My Destiny**	**Kim Sung-joo** – **Baek Jong-won's Alley Restaurant**
Best Entertainer Award	Best Teamwork Award
**Shin Sung-rok** – **Master in the House**; **Park Sun-young – Flaming Youth**	**Same Bed, Different Dreams 2: You Are My Destiny Team**; Park Sung-kwang and Lee Sol-yi; Jun Jin and Ryu Yi-seo; Oh Ji-ho and Eun Bo-ah; Song Chang-eui and Oh Ji-young
Best Couple Award	Scriptwriter of the Year
**Im Won-hee and Jung Suk-yong – My Little Old Boy**	**Lee Hae-yeon – The Story of the Day When One Bites One's Tail**; **Yook So-young – My Little Old Boy and K-Trot in Town**; **Hwang Bo-kyung – Baek Jong-won's Alley Restaurant and Delicious Rendezvous**
Hot Star Award (TV Category)	Hot Star Award (OTT Category)
**Jang Do-yeon – Park-Jang's LOL**; **Park Na-rae – Park-Jang's LOL**	**Lee Seung-gi – Master in the House**
Radio DJ Award	Rookie Radio DJ Award
**Kim Chang-wan – This Beautiful Morning, This Is Kim Chang-wan**	**Heo Ji-woong – Heo Ji-woong Show**
Golden Content Award
**Running Man Team – Running Man**; **Law of the Jungle Team – Law of the Jungle**

== Presenters ==
Order	Presenter	Award
1	Yoo Jae-suk and Jang Do-yeon	Rookie Award
2	Kim Jong-kook and Yang Se-hyung	SBS Special Awards
3	Haha and Jee Seok-jin	Best Teamwork Award
4	Yang Se-chan and Jeon So-min	Best Entertainer Award
4	Yang Se-chan and Jeon So-min	Best Couple Award
5	Jessi and Seo Jang-hoon	Golden Content Award
6	Shin Dong-yup	Legendary Special Awards (Entertainer Legend)
7	Kim Gu-Ra	Legendary Special Awards (Eternal Legend)
8	Yoo Jae-suk	Legendary Special Awards (Talk Show Legend)
9	Kim Dong-hyun, Oh Ji-ho	Golden Content Award
10	Kim Hee-chul and Lee Young-ji	Hot Star Award
11	Tak Jae-hoon and Seol In-ah	Excellence Awards
12	Park Na-rae and Shin Sung-rok	Top Excellence Awards
13	Song Ji-hyo and Kim Sung-joo	Producer Award
14	Yoo Jae-suk and Choi Young-in	Grand Prize (Daesang)

== Special performances ==
Order	Artist	Song	Ref.
1	JYP and Sunmi	Nobody (Original: Wonder Girls)	
1	JYP and Sunmi	Tell Me (Original: Wonder Girls)	
1	JYP and Sunmi	When We Disco	
2	Lovelyz	Obliviate	
3	K-Trot in Town Top 6	Jab Cho (Original: Na Hoon-a)	
3	K-Trot in Town Top 6	Wild Bee (Original: Kang Jin)	
3	K-Trot in Town Top 6	Twist (Original: Jang Yoon-jeong)	
4	Kim Jong-kook, Lee Sang-min and Sandara Park	White Love (Original: Turbo)	
4	Kim Hyun-chul and Sung Si-kyung	How Come (Kim Hyun-chul)	
4	Yoon Do-hyun, Choi Jung-hoon (Jannabi), Kim Hyun-chul, Sung Si-kyung, Kim Jong-kook, Lee Sang-min and Sandara Park	A Flying Butterfly (YB)	
5	Jessi	Nunu Nana	

== See also ==
- 2020 KBS Entertainment Awards
- 2020 MBC Entertainment Awards
