= Lee Hwi-jae =

South Korean comedian and host

Lee Hwi-jae (이휘재)
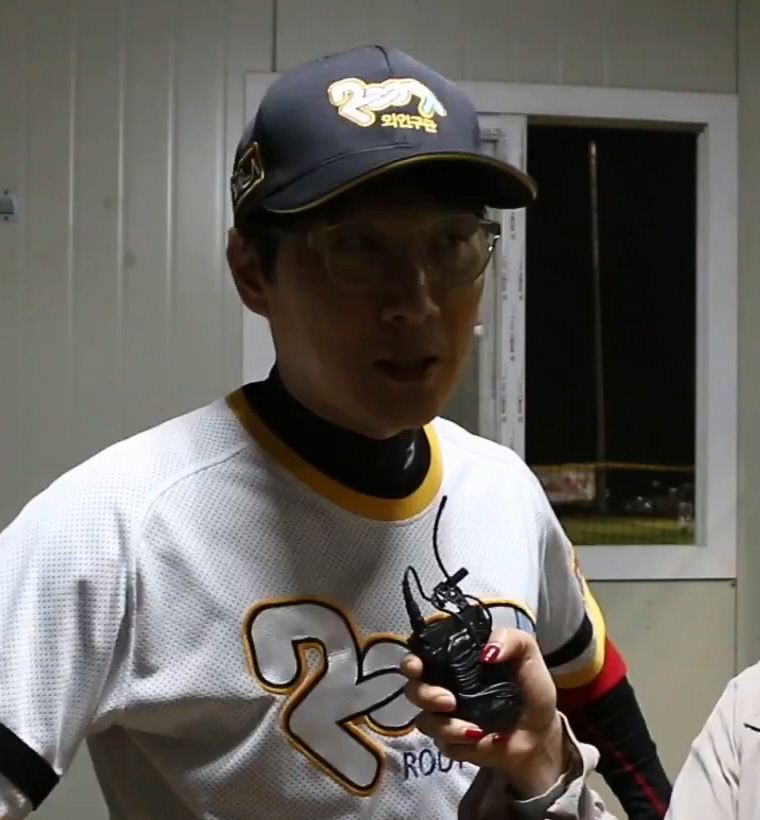
- Lee in 2017
- Born: Lee Young-jae; December 29, 1972 (age 53); Mungyeong County, North Gyeongsang Province, South Korea
- Education: Seoul Institute of the Arts
- Occupations: Actor; host; singer; comedian
- Years active: 1992–present
- Agent: Cube Entertainment

Korean name
- Hangul: 이영재
- Hanja: 李永宰
- RR: I Yeongjae
- MR: I Yŏngjae

Stage name
- Hangul: 이휘재
- Hanja: 李輝宰
- RR: I Hwijae
- MR: I Hwijae

Lee Hwi-jae (born Lee Young-jae on December 29, 1972) is a South Korean TV presenter, comedian, actor, and singer. Lee studied theater at the Seoul Institute of the Arts, then made his TV debut in 1992 as a comedian after working as a floor director for MBC's entertainment program Sunday, Sunday Night. He shot to stardom in the program Life Theater. Since then, he has expanded his career to hosting variety shows such as Sang Sang Plus, Sponge and Quiz to Change the World. He was the third highest-paid entertainer at MBC in 2008, earning ₩574.5 million.

== Personal life ==
Hwi-jae married florist Moon Jeong-won at the Grand Hyatt Hotel in Seoul on December 5, 2010. Their twin sons, Lee Seo-eon and Lee Seo-jun, were born on March 15, 2013. He and his twins appeared in the variety show The Return of Superman from November 3, 2013 to April 14, 2018.

== Filmography ==
=== Television series ===
Year	Title	Network	Notes	Ref.
1994	Guy Kim	MBC		
1995	Three Color Friendship: "It’s Suffering for Seniors"	SBS		
1995	To Make a Man	KBS2		
1996	Reporting for Duty	KBS2		
1996	Lee Hwi-jae's: Macho Commando	SBS		
1998	Three Guys and Three Girls	MBC		
1999	My Love Han Ji-soon	SBS		
2000	Cool Guys	KBS2	2000–2001	
2003	Go Mom Go!	KBS2	2003–2004	
2004	Old Miss Diary	KBS2		
2005	Banjun Drama	SBS		
2005	Lawyers	MBC		
2005	Hello Franceska 3	MBC	cameo	
2005	Look Back With a Smile	KBS2	cameo	
2011	The Greatest Love	MBC	cameo	
2013	Royal Villa	jTBC	cameo	
2016	Listen to Love	jTBC	cameo	
2017	Go Back	KBS2	cameo	

=== Film ===
Year	Title	Film Production	Notes	Ref.
1992	Bloody Fight for Revenge			
1993	빛나리랑 영자랑 휘재랑			
1995	멀고 먼 해후			
1996	Albatross			
1997	Hallelujah			
2000	The Picture Diary			
2003	Singles		cameo	
2006	Old Miss Diary – Movie		cameo	
2011	초대받지 못한 손님			

=== Variety show ===
Year	Title	Network	Notes	Ref.
1993	Life Theater	MBC	1993–1994, 1997	
1993	Baby Face Club	MBC	1993–1994, 1997	
1994	오늘은 좋은 날 – 큰 집 사람들	MBC		
1999	Nam Hee-seok and Lee Hwi-jae's Wonderful Encounter	SBS	1999–2000	
1999	Nam Hee-seok and Lee Hwi-jae's 한국이 보인다	KBS2	1999–2000	
2000	한국이 보인다	KBS2	2000–2001	
2000	Bank	KBS2	2000–2002	
2001	Beautiful Sunday	SBS		
2001	Lee and Yoo's Night	KBS2	2001–2002	
2001	Super TV Sunday Fun	KBS2	2001–2002	
2003	Sponge	KBS2	2003–2012	
2004	Healthy Men and Women	SBS		
2004	Star Olympiad	SBS		
2004	Medical Non-Fiction! Last Warning	SBS		
2004	M Countdown	Mnet	2004–2005	
2004	Sang Sang Plus	KBS2	2004–2008	
2008	We Got Married – Season 1	MBC	2008–2009	
2008	Quiz to Change the World	MBC	2008–2009	
2008	1000 Songs Challenge	SBS		
2009	Hunters	MBC	2009–2010	
2009	I Have an Uncle	KBS2		
2009	Determine Women's Ranks	QTV	2009–2011	
2010	Heroes	SBS	2010–2011	
2010	Eco House	MBC		
2011	Secret	KBS2		
2011	Birth of a Family	KBS2	2011–2012	
2012	Diamond Girl	QTV		
2012	We Are Detectives	jTBC	2012–2013	
2013	Extreme 7	MBC Every1		
2013	Super Match	SBS		
2013	Diet Master	StoryOn		
2013	Vitamin	KBS2	2013–2017	
2013	Super Dog	KBS2		
2013	The Return of Superman	KBS2	2013–2018	
2013	The Victory with Doctors	jTBC		
2013	Happy Together		Guest, with Tablo, Seong-hoon & Hyun-sung	
2014	Beauty Shop	Channel A		
2015	Match Made in Heaven Returns	MBC Every1	MC, with Leeteuk	
2016	Battle Trip	KBS	MC, 2016–2019	
2016	Vocal War: God's Voice	SBS	Co-host with Sung Si-kyung	
2021	Blindly Commerce	Channel A	Host	
2021	The Man Who Writes a Wife Card	TV Chosun	Host	
2021	Tomorrow's Baseball King	Channel A	Host	
2021	Battle in the Box	MBN	Host	

=== Hosting events ===
Year	Event	Hosts	Notes	Ref.
2005	11th Korea Musical Awards			
2005	4th KBS Entertainment Awards			
2006	5th KBS Entertainment Awards			
2007	43rd Paeksang Arts Awards			
2007	Baseball Golden Glove Awards			
2007	SBS Gayo Daejeon			
2008	SBS Entertainment Awards			
2009	1st 대한민국 희극인의 날			
2009	MBC Drama Awards			
2010	46th Paeksang Arts Awards	with Kim Ah-joong		
2011	2011 KBS Music Festival			
2012	48th Paeksang Arts Awards	with Kim Ah-joong		
2012	MBC Gayo Daejejeon			
2013	25th Korea PD Awards			
2013	2nd APAN Star Awards	with Park So-yeon		
2013	2013 KBS Music Festival	with Bae Suzy and Yoon Shi-yoon		
2013	2013 SBS Drama Awards	with Lee Bo-young and Kim Woo-bin		
2014	2014 SBS Drama Awards	with Park Shin-hye and Park Seo-joon		
2014	2014 KBS Music Festival	with Ok Taec-yeon and Im Yoon-ah		
2016	2016 SBS Drama Awards	with Bang Min-ah and Jang Geun-suk		
2016	2016 KBS Entertainment Awards	with Lee Hye-ri and Yoo Hee-yeol		

== Discography ==
=== Album ===
Year	Album	Details	Certification	Ref.
1995	An Experience	—N/a	—N/a	
1997	Rebirth	—N/a	—N/a	

=== Song contribution ===
Year	Track	Album	Artist	Notes	Ref.
2000	"Smile"	Live in Concert	Yurisangja		
2000	"축복해요"	Imagine	Song Eun-i		
2003	"2 Man Show"	Smile	Lena Park		

=== Musical theatre ===
- March! Waikiki Brothers (2006)

=== Book ===
- 별난 사람들의 별나지 않은 그 집 이야기 (2010)

== Awards and nominations ==
Year presented, name of the award ceremony, award category, nominated works and the result of the nomination
Year	Award	Category	Nominated works	Result	Ref.
2009	MBC Entertainment Awards	Grand Prize (Daesang)	—N/a	Nominated	
2010	MBC Entertainment Awards	Best MC Award (with Park Mi-sun & Kim Gura)	Quiz to Change the World	Won	
2011	SBS Entertainment Awards	Netizen Popularity Award	1000 Song Challenge	Nominated	
2013	KBS Entertainment Awards	Producer's Special Award	The Return of Superman	Won	
2014	KBS Entertainment Awards	Popularity Award ( Hwi-jae's Twins with Sarang & Haru)	The Return of Superman	Won	
2014	KBS Entertainment Awards	Producer's Special Award (with Song Il-gook)	The Return of Superman	Won	
2015	KBS Entertainment Awards	Grand Prize (Daesang)	The Return of Superman, Vitamin	Won	
2016	KBS Entertainment Awards	Grand Prize (Daesang)	The Return of Superman, Vitamin	Nominated	
