= List of awards and nominations received by Yoo Jae-suk =

Yoo Jae-suk awards and nominations
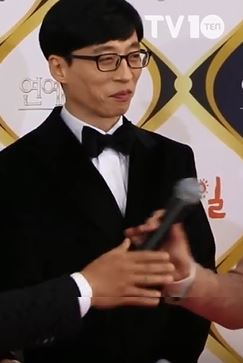
- Yoo at 2016 KBS Entertainment Awards
Awards and nominations
Award	Wins	Nominations
APAN Music Awards	0	1
Baeksang Arts Awards	4	9
Blue Dragon Series Awards	1	2
Blue Media Award	1	1
Brand Customer Loyalty Award	3	3
Brand of the Year Awards	6	6
Gyeongin Broadcasting and Entertainment	1	1
Inaugural KBS College Student Gag Competition	1	1
InStyle Korea	1	1
KBS Entertainment Awards	6	6
Korea First Brand Awards	1	1
Korean Broadcasting Producer Awards	3	3
MBC Drama Awards	1	1
MBC Entertainment Awards	23	23
Mnet 20's Choice Awards	1	1
Mnet Asian Music Awards	1	1
National Rowing Championships 2000m Novice	1	1
Nickelodeon Korea Kids' Choice Awards	6	6
SBS Drama Awards	1	1
SBS Entertainment Awards	20	24
Visionary Awards	1	1

Totals (Note: Certain award groups do not simply award one winner. They acknowledge several different recipients, have runners-up, and have third place. Since this is a specific recognition and is different from losing an award, runner-up mentions are considered wins in this award tally. For simplification and to avoid errors, each award in this list has been presumed to have had a prior nomination.)
- Wins: 83
- Nominations: 94

This is a list of awards and nominations received by Yoo Jae-suk.

== Awards and nominations ==
The name of the award ceremony, year presented, award category, nominee of the award, and the result of the award
Award ceremony	Year	Category	Nominee / work	Result	Ref.
APAN Music Awards	2020	Best Solo – Male (Domestic)	Yoo Jae-suk	Nominated	
Baeksang Arts Awards	2006	Best Variety Performer – Male	Yoo Jae-suk	Won	
Baeksang Arts Awards	2008	Best Variety Performer – Male	Yoo Jae-suk	Nominated	
Baeksang Arts Awards	2013	Grand Prize (Daesang) for TV	Yoo Jae-suk	Won	
Baeksang Arts Awards	2013	Best Variety Performer – Male	Yoo Jae-suk	Nominated	
Baeksang Arts Awards	2020	Best Variety Performer – Male	Hangout with Yoo	Won	
Baeksang Arts Awards	2021	Best Variety Performer – Male	Hangout with Yoo, Sixth Sense	Nominated	
Baeksang Arts Awards	2021	Grand Prize (Daesang) for TV	Hangout with Yoo, Sixth Sense	Won	
Baeksang Arts Awards	2024	Best Male Variety Performer	Yoo Jae-suk	Nominated	
Baeksang Arts Awards	2025	Best Male Variety Performer	Yoo Jae-suk	Nominated	
Blue Dragon Series Awards	2022	Best Male Entertainer	Play You	Nominated	
Blue Dragon Series Awards	2023	Best Male Entertainer	Play You Level Up: Villain's World	Won	
Blue Media Award (Note: Hosted by the Korean Women's Association)	2007	Language Award	Yoo Jae-suk	Won	
Brand Customer Loyalty Awards	2021	Entertainer (Variety Show – Male)	Yoo Jae-suk	Won	
Brand Customer Loyalty Awards	2022	Best Male Entertainer	Yoo Jae-suk	Won	
Brand Customer Loyalty Awards	2025	Male Web Variety Show MC	Just an Excuse	Won	
Brand of the Year Awards	2020	Weekend Program	Hangout with Yoo	Won	
Brand of the Year Awards	2020	Hot Icon	SSAK3	Won	
Brand of the Year Awards	2020	Talk Program	You Quiz on the Block	Won	
Brand of the Year Awards	2020	Entertainer of the Year – Male	Yoo Jae-suk	Won	
Brand of the Year Awards	2021	Male Variety Show Star	Yoo Jae-suk	Won	
Brand of the Year Awards	2022	Entertainer (Male)	Yoo Jae-suk	Won	
Gyeongin Broadcasting and Entertainment	2000	Popular Comedian Award	Yoo Jae-suk	Won	
Inaugural KBS College Student Gag Competition	1991	Honorable Award	Yoo Jae-suk	Won	
InStyle Korea	2016	Entertainer Star Icon (Male category)	Yoo Jae-suk	Won	
KBS Entertainment Awards	2003	Top Excellence Award in Television MC	Yoo Jae-suk	Won	
KBS Entertainment Awards	2005	Grand Prize (Daesang)	Yoo Jae-suk	Won	
KBS Entertainment Awards	2010	Best Teamwork Award	Happy Together 3	Won	
KBS Entertainment Awards	2013	Eating Broadcast Award	Happy Together 3	Won	
KBS Entertainment Awards	2014	Grand Prize (Daesang)	Yoo Jae-suk	Won	
KBS Entertainment Awards	2016	Best Teamwork Award	Happy Together 3	Won	
Korea First Brand Awards	2021	Best Variety Entertainer	Yoo Jae-suk	Won	
Korean Broadcasting Producer Awards	2006	Best Television MC	Yoo Jae-suk	Won	
Korean Broadcasting Producer Awards	2009	Best Television MC	Yoo Jae-suk	Won	
Korean Broadcasting Producer Awards	2021	Best Television MC	Yoo Jae-suk	Won	
MBC Drama Awards	2000	Special Award in Television MC	Yoo Jae-suk	Won	
MBC Entertainment Awards	2003	Top Excellence Award in Show/Variety	Yoo Jae-suk	Won	
MBC Entertainment Awards	2006	Grand Prize (Daesang)	Yoo Jae-suk	Won	
MBC Entertainment Awards	2007	Grand Prize (Daesang)	Yoo Jae-suk (with Infinite Challenge members)	Won	
MBC Entertainment Awards	2009	Grand Prize (Daesang)	Yoo Jae-suk	Won	
MBC Entertainment Awards	2009	PD Award	Yoo Jae-suk	Won	
MBC Entertainment Awards	2010	Grand Prize (Daesang)	Yoo Jae-suk	Won	
MBC Entertainment Awards	2010	Korean Guardian Tree Award	Yoo Jae-suk	Won	
MBC Entertainment Awards	2011	Top Excellence Award in a Variety Show	Yoo Jae-suk	Won	
MBC Entertainment Awards	2012	PD Award	Yoo Jae-suk	Won	
MBC Entertainment Awards	2014	Grand Prize (Daesang)	Yoo Jae-suk	Won	
MBC Entertainment Awards	2015	Achievement Award	Yoo Jae-suk (with Infinite Challenge members)	Won	
MBC Entertainment Awards	2016	Grand Prize (Daesang)	Yoo Jae-suk	Won	
MBC Entertainment Awards	2019	Rookie Award (Male)	Yoo Jae-suk (as Yoo San-seul)	Won	
MBC Entertainment Awards	2019	Entertainer of the Year	Yoo Jae-suk	Won	
MBC Entertainment Awards	2020	Best Couple Award	Yoo Jae-suk (with Lee Hyori)	Won	
MBC Entertainment Awards	2020	Grand Prize (Daesang)	Yoo Jae-suk	Won	
MBC Entertainment Awards	2021	Best Couple Award	Yoo Jae-suk (with Mijoo and Haha); Hangout with Yoo	Won	
MBC Entertainment Awards	2021	Grand Prize (Daesang)	Hangout with Yoo	Won	
MBC Entertainment Awards	2022	Entertainer of the Year Award	Yoo Jae-suk	Won	
MBC Entertainment Awards	2024	Entertainer of the Year Award	Yoo Jae-suk	Won	
MBC Entertainment Awards	2024	Best Couple Award	Yoo Jae-suk (with Haha); Hangout with Yoo	Won	
MBC Entertainment Awards	2025	Grand Prize (Daesang)	Hangout with Yoo	Won	
MBC Entertainment Awards	2025	Entertainer of the Year Award	Yoo Jae-suk	Won	
Mnet 20's Choice Awards	2008	Variety Star of the Year	Yoo Jae-suk	Won	
Mnet Asian Music Awards	2020	2020 Visionary	Yoo Jae-suk	Won	
National Rowing Championships 2000m Novice	2011	Eight Special Award	Yoo Jae-suk	Won	
Nickelodeon Korea Kids' Choice Awards	2008	Favorite Comedian	Yoo Jae-suk	Won	
Nickelodeon Korea Kids' Choice Awards	2009	Favorite Comedian	Yoo Jae-suk	Won	
Nickelodeon Korea Kids' Choice Awards	2010	Favorite Comedian	Yoo Jae-suk	Won	
Nickelodeon Korea Kids' Choice Awards	2011	Favorite Comedian	Yoo Jae-suk	Won	
Nickelodeon Korea Kids' Choice Awards	2012	Favorite Comedian	Yoo Jae-suk	Won	
Nickelodeon Korea Kids' Choice Awards	2013	Favorite Comedian	Yoo Jae-suk	Won	
SBS Drama Awards	2004	Special Award in Television MC	Yoo Jae-suk	Won	
SBS Entertainment Awards	2008	Grand Prize (Daesang)	Yoo Jae-suk	Won	
SBS Entertainment Awards	2009	Grand Prize (Daesang)	Yoo Jae-suk (with Lee Hyori)	Won	
SBS Entertainment Awards	2009	Best Teamwork Award	Family Outing	Won	
SBS Entertainment Awards	2010	SBS 20th Anniversary Entertainment Top 10 Star Award	Yoo Jae-suk	Won	
SBS Entertainment Awards	2011	Grand Prize (Daesang)	Yoo Jae-suk	Won	
SBS Entertainment Awards	2011	Netizen Popularity Award	Yoo Jae-suk	Nominated	
SBS Entertainment Awards	2012	Grand Prize (Daesang)	Yoo Jae-suk	Won	
SBS Entertainment Awards	2012	Viewers' Favorite TV Personality	Yoo Jae-suk	Won	
SBS Entertainment Awards	2013	Viewer's Choice Most Popular Entertainer Award	Yoo Jae-suk	Won	
SBS Entertainment Awards	2013	Viewer's Most Popular Award	Yoo Jae-suk (with Running Man members)	Won	
SBS Entertainment Awards	2014	Viewer's Choice Most Popular Entertainer Award	Yoo Jae-suk	Won	
SBS Entertainment Awards	2015	Grand Prize (Daesang)	Yoo Jae-suk (with Kim Byung-man)	Won	
SBS Entertainment Awards	2015	Viewers' Favorite TV Personality	Yoo Jae-suk	Won	
SBS Entertainment Awards	2016	Grand Prize (Daesang)	Yoo Jae-suk	Nominated	
SBS Entertainment Awards	2019	Grand Prize (Daesang)	Yoo Jae-suk	Won	
SBS Entertainment Awards	2020	Grand Prize (Daesang)	Yoo Jae-suk	Nominated	
SBS Entertainment Awards	2020	Golden Content Award	Yoo Jae-suk (with Running Man members)	Won	
SBS Entertainment Awards	2021	Entertainer of the Year Award	Yoo Jae-suk	Won	
SBS Entertainment Awards	2022	Grand Prize (Daesang)	Yoo Jae-suk	Won	
SBS Entertainment Awards	2022	Best Couple Award	Yoo Jae-suk (with Kim Jong-kook)	Won	
SBS Entertainment Awards	2024	Grand Prize (Daesang)	Yoo Jae-suk	Won	
SBS Entertainment Awards	2025	Grand Prize (Daesang)	Yoo Jae-suk	Nominated	
SBS Entertainment Awards	2025	Face of SBS (chosen by AI)	Yoo Jae-suk	Won	
SBS Entertainment Awards	2025	Best Couple	Yoo Jae-suk (with Yoo Yeon-seok); Whenever Possible	Won	
Visionary Awards (Note: Visionary Awards, which started in 2020, selects and awards people who lead roles in the Korean entertainment industry. It highlights the meaning and achievements of a person whose chosen trend keywords penetrated the entertainment industry, including broadcasting, movies, music, and performances, and presents the next vision of the cultural sector with outstanding achievements and influence.)	2021	2021 Visionary	Yoo Jae-suk	Won	

== Other accolades ==
=== State honors ===
Name of country, year given, and name of honor
Country	Ceremony	Year	Honor Or Award	Ref.
South Korea	Korean Popular Culture and Arts Awards (Note: Honors are given at the Korean Popular Culture and Arts Awards, arranged by the Korea Creative Content Agency and hosted by the Ministry of Culture, Sports and Tourism. They are awarded to those who have contributed to the arts and South Korea's pop culture.)	2012	Minister of Culture, Sports and Tourism Commendation	
South Korea	Korean Popular Culture and Arts Awards	2018	Presidential Commendation	
South Korea	Korean Popular Culture and Arts Awards	2026	Order of Cultural Merit, 3rd Class	

=== Listicles ===
Name of publisher, year listed, name of listicle, and placement
Publisher	Year	List	Placement	Ref.
Forbes	2009	Korea Power Celebrity 40	9th	
Forbes	2010	Korea Power Celebrity 40	9th	
Forbes	2011	Korea Power Celebrity 40	6th	
Forbes	2012	Korea Power Celebrity 40	19th	
Forbes	2013	Korea Power Celebrity 40	30th	
Forbes	2014	Korea Power Celebrity 40	12th	
Forbes	2015	Korea Power Celebrity 40	21st	
Forbes	2016	Korea Power Celebrity 40	15th	
Forbes	2017	Korea Power Celebrity 40	13th	
Forbes	2019	Korea Power Celebrity 40	12th	
Forbes	2020	Korea Power Celebrity 40	14th	
Forbes	2021	Korea Power Celebrity 40	7th	
Forbes	2022	Korea Power Celebrity 40	9th	
Forbes	2023	Korea Power Celebrity 40	5th	
Forbes	2025	Korea Power Celebrity 40	10th	
Gallup Korea	2007	Gallup Korea's Entertainer of the Year	1st	
Gallup Korea	2008	Gallup Korea's Entertainer of the Year	1st	
Gallup Korea	2009	Gallup Korea's Entertainer of the Year	1st	
Gallup Korea	2010	Gallup Korea's Entertainer of the Year	2nd	
Gallup Korea	2011	Gallup Korea's Entertainer of the Year	2nd	
Gallup Korea	2012	Gallup Korea's Entertainer of the Year	1st	
Gallup Korea	2013	Gallup Korea's Entertainer of the Year	1st	
Gallup Korea	2014	Gallup Korea's Entertainer of the Year	1st	
Gallup Korea	2015	Gallup Korea's Entertainer of the Year	1st	
Gallup Korea	2016	Gallup Korea's Entertainer of the Year	1st	
Gallup Korea	2015	Gallup Korea's Entertainer of the Year	1st	
Gallup Korea	2016	Gallup Korea's Entertainer of the Year	1st	
Gallup Korea	2017	Gallup Korea's Entertainer of the Year	1st	
Gallup Korea	2018	Gallup Korea's Entertainer of the Year	1st	
Gallup Korea	2019	Gallup Korea's Entertainer of the Year	1st	
Gallup Korea	2020	Gallup Korea's Entertainer of the Year	1st	
Gallup Korea	2021	Gallup Korea's Entertainer of the Year	1st	
Gallup Korea	2022	Gallup Korea's Entertainer of the Year	1st	
Gallup Korea	2023	Gallup Korea's Entertainer of the Year	1st	
Hankook Ilbo	2015	Hankook Ilbo Top 10 Influential Figures	5th	
Herald Economy	2007	Pop Culture Power Leader Big 30	5th	
Herald Economy	2008	Pop Culture Power Leader Big 30	3rd	
Herald Economy	2009	Pop Culture Power Leader Big 30	2nd	
Herald Economy	2010	Pop Culture Power Leader Big 30	5th	
Herald Economy	2011	Pop Culture Power Leader Big 30	3rd	
Herald Economy	2012	Pop Culture Power Leader Big 30	15th	
Herald Economy	2013	Pop Culture Power Leader Big 30	4th	
Herald Economy	2014	Pop Culture Power Leader Big 30	5th	
Herald Economy	2015	Pop Culture Power Leader Big 30	4th	
KBS	2023	The 50 people who made KBS shine	34th	
Sisa Journal (Note: Sisa Journal Next Generation Leader-Society was founded by Sisa Journal in 2008.)	2011	Next Generation Leader — Broadcasting and Entertainment	1st	
Sisa Journal	2012	Next Generation Leader — Broadcasting and Entertainment	2nd	
Sisa Journal	2013	Next Generation Leader — Broadcasting and Entertainment	2nd	
Sisa Journal	2015	Next Generation Leader — Broadcasting and Entertainment	1st	
Sisa Journal	2015	Next Generation Leader — Pop Culture	4th	
Sisa Journal	2015	Next Generation Leader 100	12th	
Sisa Journal	2016	Most Influential Person — Broadcasting & Entertainment	1st	
Sisa Journal	2017	Most Influential Person — Broadcasting & Entertainment	1st	
Sisa Journal	2017	Next Generation Leader — Culture, Arts, Sports	7th	
Sisa Journal	2018	Most Influential Person in Broadcasting & Entertainment	1st	
Sisa Journal	2018	Next Generation Leader in Society	19th (Note: Tied with BTS, Jung Woo-sung, Sean, etc.)	
Sisa Journal	2019	Most Influential Person in Broadcasting & Entertainment	2nd	
Sisa Journal	2020	Most Influential Person in Broadcasting & Entertainment	1st	
Sisa Journal	2021	Most Influential Person in Broadcasting & Entertainment	1st	
Sisa Journal	2022	Most Influential Person in Broadcasting & Entertainment	1st	
Sisa Journal	2023	Most Influential Person in Broadcasting & Entertainment	1st	
Sisa Journal	2023	Next Generation Leader in Society	2nd	
