= 2023 SBS Entertainment Awards =

17th edition of award ceremony

- Official poster
- Awarded for: Excellence in variety entertainment
- Date: December 30, 2023
- Venue: SBS Prism Tower, Sangam-dong, Mapo-gu, Seoul
- Country: South Korea
- Presented by: Seoul Broadcasting System
- Hosted by: Lee Sang-min; Kim Ji-eun; Lee Hyun-i
- First award: 2007

Highlights
- Grand Prize (Daesang): Tak Jae-hoon
- Website: SBS Entertainment Awards

Television/radio coverage
- Network: SBS TV

The 2023 SBS Entertainment Awards presented by Seoul Broadcasting System (SBS), took place on December 30, 2023, at SBS Prism Tower in Sangam-dong, Mapo-gu, Seoul. The award ceremony was hosted by Lee Sang-min, Lee Hyun-i and Kim Ji-eun.

== Nominations and winners ==
Nominations for Grand Prize were revealed on December 28, 2023.

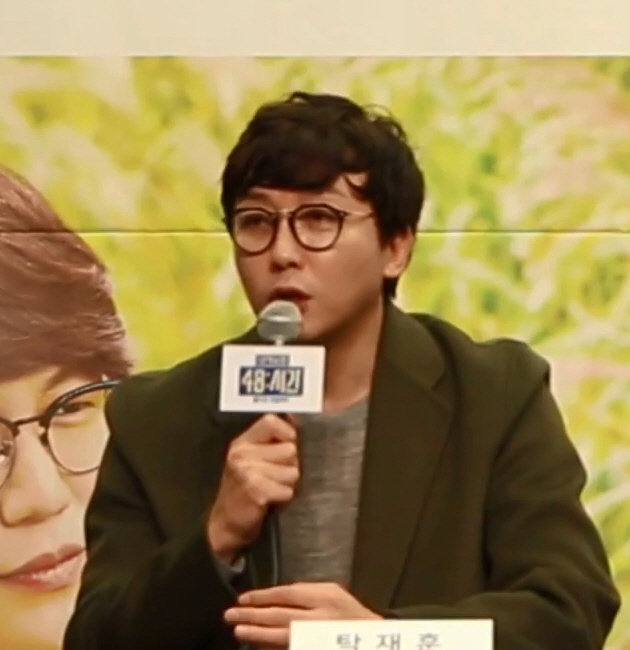
Tak Jae-hoon, winner of Grand Prize (Daesang)

(Winners denoted in bold)

Grand Prize (Daesang)
**Tak Jae-hoon**; Shin Dong-yup; Yoo Jae-suk; Lee Sang-min; Kim Jong-kook; Seo Jang-hoon; Lee Hyun-i
Producer Award		Program of the Year Award	
**Jee Seok-jin – Running Man**		**Running Man**	
Top Excellence Award Male		Top Excellence Award Female	
**Kim Jong-min – My Little Old Boy, Golf Battle: Birdie Buddies**; **Bae Sung-jae – Kick a Goal**		**Lee Ji-hye –Same Bed, Different Dreams 2: You Are My Destiny**	
Excellence Award		Yashin Award	
**Oh Sang-jin – Same Bed, Different Dreams 2: You Are My Destiny,**; **Song Hae-na – Kick a Goal**		**Kisum – Kick a Goal**	
Honorary Employee Award		Good Influence Program Award	
**Im Won-hee – My Little Old Boy**		**Same Bed, Different Dreams 2: You Are My Destiny**	
Century Club Award
**Jo Hye-ryun**; **Lee Hyun-i**; **Jung Hye-in**; **Kim Min-kyung**; **Oh Na-mi**; **Song Hae-na**; **Ahn Hye-kyung**; **Saori**
Puskás Award		Rookie Award	
**Kim Seung-hye – Kick a Goal**		**Kim Ji-eun – Neighbourhood Restaurant, Inkigayo**; **Shin Ji-ru – Meokjjibba: Big Survival**	
Radio DJ		Best Couple Award	
Power FM	Love FM	Best Couple Award	
**DinDin – Din Din's Music High**	**Ji Sang-ryeol – If It's Hot, It's Ji Sang-ryeol**	**Lee Jang-won and Bae Da-hae – Same Bed, Different Dreams 2: You Are My Destiny**	**Lee Eul-yong and Baek Ji-hoon – Kick a Goal**
Scriptwriter Award
Liberal Arts Category		Entertainment Category	Radio Category
**Oh Yoo-kyung – Unanswered Questions**		**Kim Sae-yeon – My Little Old Boy**	**Hong Eun-hye – If It's Hot, It's Ji Sang-ryeol**
Gourmet Star Award	Special Award	Eco-brity Award	Best Team Work Award
**Park Na-rae – Meokjjibba: Big Survival**	**Yoo Jung-soo – Neighbourhood Restaurant**	**Cha In-pyo, Jung Sang-hoon, Ryu Soo-young, Jason – Green Fathers' Association - Husbands Next Door**	**Meokjjibba: Big Survival**
Scene Stealer Award		2023 SBS's Daughter and Son	
Scene Stealer Award		Daughter	Son
**Yang Se-chan – Running Man**; Kim Joon-ho – My Little Old Boy, Dolsing Fourmen; Jee Seok-jin – Running Man; Poongja – Meokjjibba: Big Survival; Kim Jong-kook – Running Man, My Little Old Boy		**Lee Hyun-yi** – **Kick a Goal, Same Bed, Different Dreams 2: You Are My Destiny, DNA Singers**	**Lee Sang-min – My Little Old Boy, Dolsing Fourmen**
Hot Issue Award		Rising Star Award	
**Lee Dong-gun – My Little Old Boy**		**Kim Gun-woo – My Little Old Boy**; **Eom Ji-yoon – Neighbourhood Restaurant**; **Son Dong-pyo – Strong Heart VS**	
The Most Short Clip Views Award		Golden Solo Award	
**Kim Jong-kook – Running Man, My Little Old Boy**		**Tak Jae-hoon, Im Won-hee, Lee Sang-min, Kim Joon-ho – Dolsing Fourmen**	

== Performances ==
Order	Artist	Act performed	Ref.
1	Universe Ticket	Come with Me?	
1	Universe Ticket and Dynamic Duo	Smoke	
2	Kyungseo	One Man (한 남자) (Originally by Kim Jong-kook)	
2	Kyungseo and Kim Jong-kook	Loveable (사랑스러워)	
3	Young Tak	FORM (폼 미쳤다)	
3	Young Tak, Oh Sang-jin and Jo Woo-jong	Why Are You Coming Out From There (니가왜거기서나와)	
3	Young Tak, Oh Sang-jin and Jo Woo-jong	It's Real (찐이아)	
4	(G)I-dle and Meokjjibba (The Big Guys)	Queencard (퀸카)	

== See also ==
- 2023 KBS Entertainment Awards
- 2023 MBC Entertainment Awards
