= 2018 SBS Entertainment Awards =

12th edition of award ceremony

- Date: December 28, 2018
- Site: SBS Prism Tower, Sangam-dong, Mapo-gu, Seoul
- Hosted by: Park Soo-hong; Han Go-eun; Kim Jong-kook

Television coverage
- Network: SBS
- Duration: 230 minutes
- Viewership: 11.8% (part 1); 11.9% (part 2)

The 2018 SBS Entertainment Awards presented by Seoul Broadcasting System (SBS), took place on December 28, 2018 at SBS Prism Tower in Sangam-dong, Mapo-gu, Seoul. It was hosted by Park Soo-hong, Han Go-eun and Kim Jong-kook. The nominees were chosen from SBS variety, talk and comedy shows that aired from December 2017 to November 2018.

== Nominations and winners ==
(Winners denoted in bold)

Grand Prize (Daesang)
**Lee Seung-gi** – **Master in the House**
Program of the Year	Hot Star of the Year
**My Little Old Boy** (Entertainment)	**Bae Jeong-nam** – **My Little Old Boy**
Top Excellence Award in Variety Category	Top Excellence Award in Show/Talk Category
**Jeon So-min** – **Running Man**	**Yang Se-hyung** – **Master in the House**, **Village Survival, the Eight**, **We Will Channel You**
Excellence Award in Variety Category	Excellence Award in Show/Talk Category
**Jo Bo-ah** – **Baek Jong-won's Alley Restaurant**; **Yook Sung-jae** – **Master in the House**; Jeon So-min – Running Man; Kim Kwang-kyu – **Flaming Youth**; Lee Yeon-soo – **Flaming Youth**	**Lee Sang-min** – **The Fan**, **My Little Old Boy**, **Reckless but Happy**; **So Yi-hyun** – **Same Bed, Different Dreams 2: You Are My Destiny**; BoA – The Fan; In Gyo-jin – Same Bed, Different Dreams 2: You Are My Destiny; Yang Se-hyung – We Will Channel You
Rookie Award in Male Category	Rookie Award in Female Category
**Lee Sang-yoon** – **Master in the House**; Bae Jeong-nam – My Little Old Boy; Song Kang – Inkigayo, Village Survival, the Eight	**Kang Kyung-heon** – **Flaming Youth**; Jennie – Running Man, Village Survival, the Eight; Jo Bo-ah – Baek Jong-won's Alley Restaurant
Producer's Award	Best MC Award
**Kim Jong-kook** – **My Little Old Boy**, **Running Man**	**Kim Sung-joo** – **Baek Jong-won's Alley Restaurant**; **Kim Sook** – **Same Bed, Different Dreams 2: You Are My Destiny**
Best Entertainer Award	Best Challenge Award
**Gu Bon-seung** – **Flaming Youth**; **Im Won-hee** – **My Little Old Boy**; Bae Jeong-nam – My Little Old Boy; Cha In-pyo – Big Picture Family, Master in the House; Hong Jin-young – My Little Old Boy, Running Man; Seungri – My Little Old Boy, We Will Channel You	**Jeon Hye-bin** – **Law of the Jungle**; Kang Han-na – Running Man; Kim Sung-ryung – Law of the Jungle; Kim Young-kwang – Law of the Jungle; Lee Da-hee – Running Man
Best Teamwork Award	Entertainment Scene Stealer Award
**Running Man team**	**Seungri** – **My Little Old Boy**, **We Will Channel You**; Jennie – Running Man, Village Survival, the Eight; Lee Da-hee – Running Man; Lee Kwang-soo – Running Man
Best Couple Award	Scriptwriter of the Year
**Kim Jong-kook** and **Hong Jin-young** – **My Little Old Boy**, **Running Man**; Gim Gu-ra and Seo Jang-hoon – My Little Old Boy, Same Bed, Different Dreams 2: You Are My Destiny; Lee Kwang-soo and Jeon So-min – Running Man	**Kim Myung-jeong** – **Master in the House**; **Lee Yoon-joo** – **TV Animal Farm**; **Yoo Hyun-soo** – **Power FM: Choi Hwa-jung's Power Time**
Mobile Icon Award	Radio DJ Award
**Cheetah** – **Strong My Way**; **JeA** – **Strong My Way**	**Boom** – **Power FM: Boom Boom Power**; **Kim Chang-yeol** – **Love FM: Kim Chang-yeol's Old School**
Popularity Award	Best Family Award
**Lee Kwang-soo** – **Running Man**	**In Gyo-jin** and **So Yi-hyun** – **Same Bed, Different Dreams 2: You Are My Destiny**

== Presenters ==
Order	Presenter	Award	Ref.
1	Yoo Jae-suk, Cha Jun-hwan	Rookie Award	
2	Kim Young-chul, Kim Sook	Radio DJ Award; Mobile Icon Award	
3	Seungri, Jeon So-min	Best Entertainer Award; Best MC Award	
4	Yang Se-chan, Kim Ji-min	Hot Star of the Year	
5	Lee Seung-gi, Lee Sang-yoon	Best Challenge Award; Best Family Award	
6	Lee Sang-min, Kim Eana	Program of the Year	
7	Im Won-hee	Best Couple Award	
8	JeA, Cheetah	Best Teamwork Award	
9	Yang Se-hyung, Yook Sung-jae	Entertainment Scene Stealer Award; Popularity Award	
10	Haha, Byul	Excellence Award in Show/Talk Category	
11	Ji Suk-jin, Jeon Hye-bin	Excellence Award in Variety Category	
12	Seo Jang-hoon, Lee Kwang-soo	Top Excellence Award	
13	In Gyo-jin, So Yi-hyun	Producer's Award	
14	Nam Seung-yong, Song Ji-hyo	Grand Prize (Daesang)	

== Special performances ==
Order	Artist	Song/Spectacle	Ref.
1	Kim Jong-kook and Park Soo-hong	"Twist King" (트위스트 킹) (Original: Turbo)	
2	DJ DOC	"I'm a Guy Like This" (나 이런 사람이야) "Dance with DOC" (DOC와 춤을...)	
3	Seungri	"Bang Bang Bang" (뱅뱅뱅) (Original: Big Bang)	
4	Hong Jin-young	"Thumb Up" (엄지 척)	
