= 2025 SBS Entertainment Awards =

19th edition of award ceremony

- Official poster
- Awarded for: Excellence in variety entertainment
- Date: December 30, 2025
- Venue: SBS Prism Tower, Sangam-dong, Mapo District, Seoul, South Korea
- Country: South Korea
- Presented by: Seoul Broadcasting System
- Hosted by: Jun Hyun-moo; Cha Tae-hyun; Lee Soo-ji
- First award: 2007

Highlights
- Grand Prize (Daesang): Lee Sang-min
- Website: SBS Entertainment Awards

Television/radio coverage
- Network: SBS TV
- Viewership: Ratings: 5%; Viewership: 972,000

The 2025 edition of the SBS Entertainment Awards presented by Seoul Broadcasting System (SBS), took place on December 30, 2025, from 21:00 (KST) at SBS Prism Tower in Sangam-dong, Mapo District, Seoul, South Korea. This year the awards held a vote for the 'Most Popular Program Award Chosen by Viewers' on Naver, until December 29. The award ceremony was hosted by Jun Hyun-moo, Cha Tae-hyun, and Lee Soo-ji. The seven candidates for the grand prize of the 2025 Awards were revealed on December 24.

== Nominations and winners ==
Nominations for Grand Prize were announced on December 24, 2025.

Winners are listed first and denoted in bold.

Grand Prize (Daesang)
**Lee Sang-min**; Yoo Jae-suk; Jun Hyun-moo; Tak Jae-hoon; Shin Dong-yup; Seo Jang-hoon; Jee Seok-jin
| Producer Award | | Program of the Year Award |
| **Yang Se-chan - RunningMan**; **Jun Hyun-moo - Jungle Bob, Wow! Really? I Can't Belive it, The Ballad of Us** | | **Running Man**; Our Ballad; Secretary Jin; Whenever Possible; Kick a Goal; My Little Old Boy; One-Take-Out Project - My Turn; Same Bed, Different Dreams 2: You Are My Destiny; Dolsing Fourmen |
| Top Excellence Award Male | | Top Excellence Award Female |
| **Choi Jin-hyuk - My Little Old Boy**; **Kim Kwang-kyu, Lee Seo-jin - My Grumpy Secretary** | | **Lee Hyun-yi - Kick a Goal, Same Bed, Different Dreams 2: You Are My Destiny**; **Kim Jin-kyung - Kick a Goal** |
| Excellence Award Male | | Excellence Award Female |
| **Yoon Si-yoon - My Little Old Boy**; **Yoo Yeon-seok - Whenever Possible** | | **Ji Ye-eun - RunningMan**; **Park Ha-yan - Kick a Goal** |
Merit Award
**Lee Kyung-kyu - My Turn**
The Face of SBS Selected by AI
**Yoo Jae-suk - RunningMan, Whenever Possible**
| Trending Program Award | Special Award | Best Team Work Award |
| **The Ballad of Us** | **HaHa - RunningMan** | **Same Bed, Different Dreams 2: You Are My Destiny** |
| Hot Clip Award | Best Entertainer Award | Challenge of the Year |
| **Cha Tae-hyun - The Ballad of Us** | **Yoon Hyun-min - My Little Old Boy** | **Im Won-hee, Kim Seung-soo, Heo Kyung-hwan - My Little Old Boy** |
| ESG Award | Best Couple Award | Positive Influence Award |
| **Lim Young-woong - Little Island Big Hero** | **Yoo Jae-suk & Yoo Yeon-seok - Whenever Possible** | **Cho Young-nam & Jung Eun-hye - Same Bed, Different Dreams 2: You Are My Destiny** |
| Scriptwriter Award | Scene Stealer Award | Radio DJ Award |
| **Mo Eun-seol - The Ballad of Us** | **Tak Jae-hoon & Choo Sung-hoon - My Turn** | **Hwang Je-seong - Hwang Je-seong's Emperor Power** |
| Rookie UP Award | Rookie Award (Male) | Rookie Award (Female) |
| **Lee Chae-yeon - Kick a Goal** | **Kim Won-hoon - My Turn** | **Lee Soo-jin - My Turn** |

== Controversy ==
The moment when the winner for the Daesang was announced where Lee Sang-min was chosen by SBS as the winner, has gone viral, which resulting on both SBS and its Entertainment Awards receiving massive negative public outrage and negative backlash from the viewers, who criticized SBS for their decisions of not giving the Daesang to Jee Seok-jin, as he was heavily favorited to win it in the recent years for his long career and contributions on entertainment industry, with every SBS' social media later were flooded with negative criticism and boycott over the result, where many people believed that SBS mistreated him and his long contributions career on purpose.
