= 2024 SBS Entertainment Awards =

18th edition of award ceremony

- Official poster
- Awarded for: Excellence in variety entertainment
- Date: January 29, 2025
- Venue: SBS Prism Tower, Sangam-dong, Mapo District, Seoul, South Korea
- Country: South Korea
- Presented by: Seoul Broadcasting System
- Hosted by: Jun Hyun-moo; Jang Do-yeon; Lee Hyun-i
- First award: 2007

Highlights
- Grand Prize (Daesang): Yoo Jae-suk
- Program of the Year Award: Running Man; My Little Old Boy
- Website: SBS Entertainment Awards

Television/radio coverage
- Network: SBS TV
- Viewership: Ratings: 3.7%; Viewers: 772,000

The 2024 SBS Entertainment Awards presented by Seoul Broadcasting System (SBS), took place on January 29, 2025, from 21:00 (KST) at SBS Prism Tower in Sangam-dong, Mapo District, Seoul, South Korea. The award ceremony was hosted by Jun Hyun-moo, Lee Hyun-i, and Jang Do-yeon.

The first teaser by the host Jun Hyun-moo with his 'Moo Dragon' styling, reminiscent of singer G-Dragon, was released on December 11.

On December 30, SBS confirmed that the entire ceremony would be cancelled, in light of the Jeju Air Flight 2216. On January 3, 2025, the award ceremony was re-scheduled for the Lunar New Year's day on January 29, 2025.

The award ceremony began with a magic performance by The Magic Star team. The first segment featured waltz performances by the couples Jo Woo-jong and Jung Da-eun, as well as Kim Min-jae and Choi Yoo-ra from Same Bed, Different Dreams 2: You Are My Destiny set to the melodic tune of "Night Yanggaeng" sung by Seo Gi, creating a festive and holiday ambiance. In the second segment, with Tak Jae-hoon and Ji Ye-eun energizing the crowd with a revamped rendition of Rosé's "Apt.". Following them, Shin Gi-ru, Lee Guk-joo, Kim Bo-kyung, Gyeong-seo, and Min-seo took the stage to perform "I Will Show You". Presenting the awards, the Grand Prize (Daesang) was won by Yoo Jae-suk, whereas the Program of the Year Award was awarded to Running Man as Most Popular Program and My Little Old Boy as Highest Viewership Program.

== Nominations and winners ==
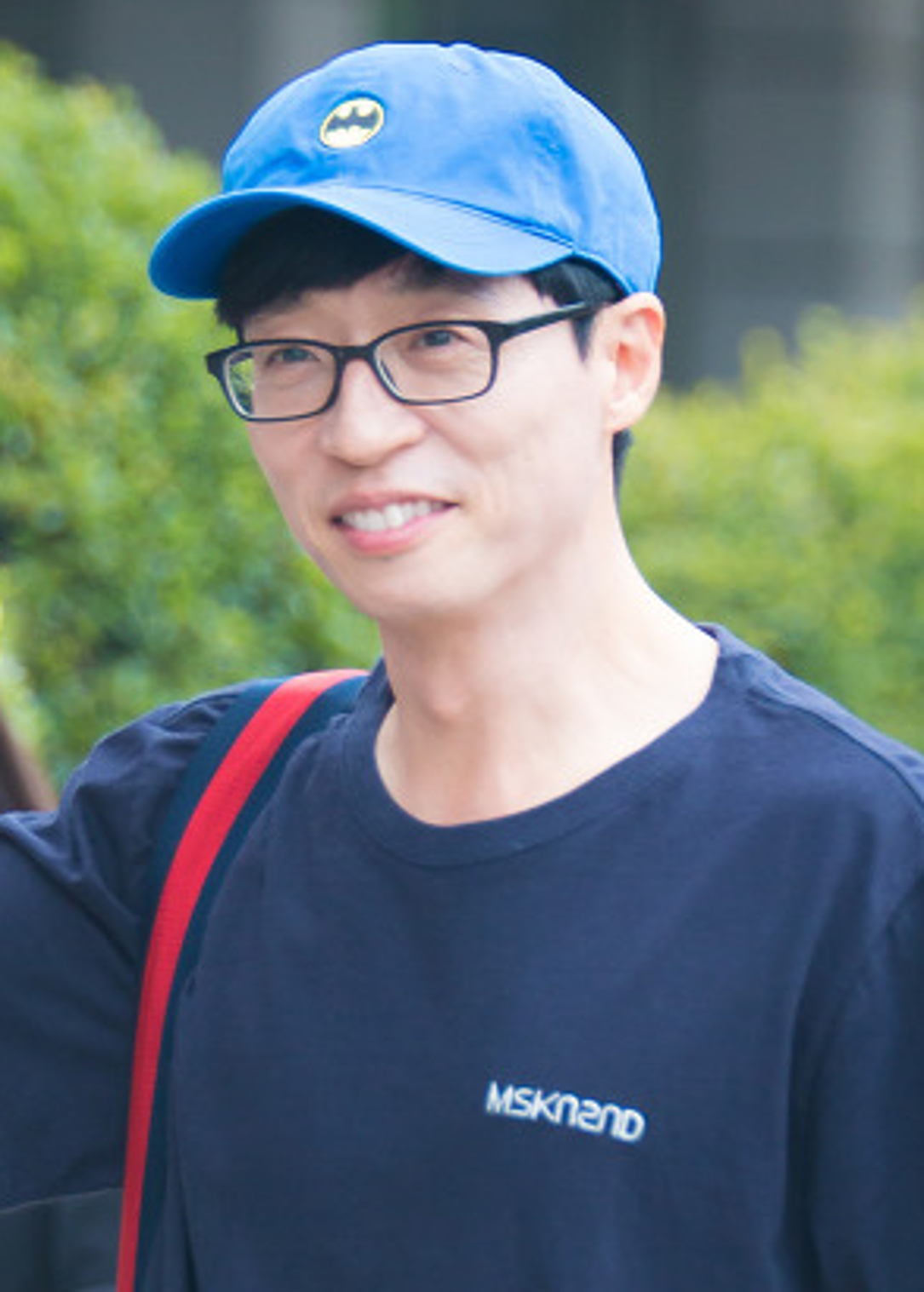
Yoo Jae-suk, winner of Grand Prize (Daesang)

Nominations for Grand Prize were revealed on December 23, 2024.

(Winners denoted in bold)

Grand Prize (Daesang)
**Yoo Jae-suk**; Jun Hyun-moo; Shin Dong-yup; Lee Sang-min; Kim Jong-kook; Seo Jang-hoon; Lee Hyun-i
Producer Award		Program of the Year Award	
**Lee Sang-min – My Little Old Boy, Shoes Off, and Single for Men**		**Most Popular Program: Running Man**; **Highest Viewership Program: My Little Old Boy**	
Top Excellence Award Male		Top Excellence Award Female	
**Kim Seung-soo – My Little Old Boy**; **Ryu Soo-young – Jungle Bob**		**Jung Hye-in – Kick a Goal**	
Excellence Award Male		Excellence Award Female	
**Choi Jin-hyuk – My Little Old Boy**; **Jo Woo-jong – Same Bed, Different Dreams 2: You Are My Destiny**		**Uee – Jungle Bob**	
Honorary Employee Award		Good Family Award	
**Kim Jun-ho**		**Same Bed, Different Dreams 2: You Are My Destiny**	
Good Partner Award		Rookie Award	
**Kim Jong-kook, Lee Dong-gun, Heo Kyung-hwan, and Kim Hee-chul – My Little Old Boy**		**(Talk/Reality): Yoo Yeon-seok – When We Get a Chance**; **(Show/Variety): Jin Seon-gyu – The Magic Star**	
Radio DJ		Best Couple Award	
Power FM	Love FM	Best Couple Award	
**Bong Tae-gyu – This Beautiful Morning, It's Bong Tae-gyu**	**Jeong Yeop – Your Night, It's Jeong Yeop**	**Kim Min-jae and Choi Yoo-ra**	
Broadcast Writer Award
**Im Chae-yoon – Neighborhood Cool**
Best Entertainer Award	ESG Award	Special Award	Best Chemistry Award
**Im Won-hee – My Little Old Boy**	**Hot Place When Touched! Neighborhood Cool House 2**	**Lee Young-pyo – Kick a Goal**	**Park Na-rae, Shin Gi-ru, Lee Guk-joo, and Pung Ja – Size Survival - Muk-jji-ppa**
Scene Stealer Award		2024 SBS' Daughter and Son	
Scene Stealer Award		Daughter	Son
**Song Ji-hyo**		**Lee Sang-min**	**Lee Hyun-yi**
Hot Issue Award		Rising Star Award	
**Yoo Ho-jin – The Magic Star**		**Kang Hoon**; **Ji Ye-eun**	
The Most Short Clip Views Award		Best Player Award	
**Kim Jong-kook – Running Man, My Little Old Boy**		**Park Ji-an and Heo Kyung-hee – Goal Time Girl**	
