= SBS Entertainment Awards =

South Korea Entertainment Awards

- Current: 2025 SBS Entertainment Awards
- Awarded for: Excellence in variety entertainment
- Location: Seoul
- Country: South Korea
- Presented by: Seoul Broadcasting System
- First award: 2007
- Final award: 2023

Television/radio coverage
- Network: SBS TV
- Runtime: approximately 140 minutes

Korean name
- Hangul: SBS 연예대상
- Hanja: SBS 演藝大賞
- RR: SBS yeonye daesang
- MR: SBS yŏnye taesang

The SBS Entertainment Awards (Korean: SBS 연예대상) is an awards ceremony held yearly, sponsored by Seoul Broadcasting System (SBS). The awards ceremony is approximately 140 minutes long and is shown in two parts on SBS. This event is held at the end of each year, and awards are given to the best entertainers for variety programs aired on its network. Since 2014, it is part of the SBS Awards Festival, along with SBS Gayo Daejeon and SBS Drama Awards. Since 2017, SAF Entertainment Award had been renamed back to SBS Entertainment Award.

== History of winners ==
=== Grand Prize Award (Daesang) ===
Year	Winner | Program	
1st 2007	Kang Ho-dong	Star King
2nd 2008	Yoo Jae-suk	Family Outing
3rd 2009	Yoo Jae-suk; Lee Hyori	Family Outing
4th 2010	Kang Ho-dong	Star King; Strong Heart
5th 2011	Yoo Jae-suk	Running Man
6th 2012	Yoo Jae-suk	Running Man
7th 2013	Kim Byung-man	Law of the Jungle; Eco Village
8th 2014	Lee Kyung-kyu	Healing Camp, Aren't You Happy; Global Junior Show
9th 2015	Yoo Jae-suk	Running Man; Same Bed, Different Dreams
9th 2015	Kim Byung-man	Law of the Jungle; Shaolin Clenched Fists
10th 2016	Shin Dong-yup	My Little Old Boy; TV Animal Farm
11th 2017	Lee Sun-mi (Kim Gun-mo's mother); Ji In-sook (Park Soo-hong's mother); Lee Ok-jin (Tony An's mother); Lim Yeo-soon (Lee Sang-min's mother)	My Little Old Boy
12th 2018	Lee Seung-gi	Master in the House
13th 2019	Yoo Jae-suk	Running Man; Village Survival, the Eight
14th 2020	Kim Jong-kook	Running Man; My Little Old Boy
15th 2021	Shin Dong-yup; Seo Jang-hoon; Cho Hye-seon (Kim Jong-kook's mother); Kim Sun-ja (Kim Hee-chul's mother); Park Young-hye (Lee Tae-sung's mother); Lee Sang-min; Tak Jae-hoon; Im Won-hee; Kim Joon-ho; Kim Jong-kook; Kim Hee-chul; Lee Tae-sung; Oh Min-suk; Park Goon; Choi Jin-hyuk	
16th 2022	Yoo Jae-suk	Running Man
17th 2023	Tak Jae-hoon	Dolsing Fourmen
18th 2024	Yoo Jae-suk	Running Man
19th 2025	Lee Sang-min	My Little Old Boy

=== 2007 Awards ===
Category	Winner
Comedy Newcomer Award	Lee Dong-yup; Lee Yong-jin
Comedy Choice Award	Kim Tae-hyun; Kim Shin-young
Comedy Prize	Kang Sung-beom
Star of the Year Award (Comedy category)	Jung Jae-young; Jeong Yong-guk; Kim Hyun-jung
Star of the Year Award (Radio category)	Cultwo; Heo Su-gyeong
Star of the Year Award (Variety category)	Choi Young-ah; Lee Kyung-kyu; Park So-hyun
Viewer's Choice Program of the Year Award	Line Up
Hallyu Program Award	X-Man
Excellence Award For Programs	1000 Song Challenge; One Night of TV Entertainment
High Excellence Award For Programs	Capture the Moment How is that Possible
All Around Entertainer Award	Haha
PD Award	Jo Hyung-ki
Special Award	Ryu Si-won
Scriptwriter Award	Jo Myung-jin; Kim Nam-gyung

=== 2008 Awards ===
Category	Winner
Newcomer Award (Comedy category)	Kim Jin-gon; Hong Yoon Hwa
Newcomer Award (Variety category)	Yang Jung-a; Gold Miss Diary
Special Award (Photographer broadcasting category)	Lee Mi-sun (Entertainment category); Jang Yun-jeong (Education category); Kim Joo-ri (Radio category)
Special Award (Announcer category)	Jeong Mi-seon
Special Award (Radio DJ)	Choi Hwa-jung
Producer's Choice Award (MC category)	Kim Gura; Shin Bong-sun
Producer's Choice Award (TV Star category)	Kim Soo-ro; Jang Yun-jeong
Best Entertainer Award	Park Sang-myun; Sol Bi
Best Teamwork Award	Team of Gold Miss Diary
Netizen's Highest Popularity Award	Lee Chun-hee; Park Ye-jin
Award for spirit	Ji Sang-ryeol; Song Eun-i; Noh Hong-chul
Excellence Comedy Award	Han Hyeon-min
High Excellence Comedy Award	Lee Yong-jin; Lee Jin-ho; Yang Se-chan; Oh In-taek
Netizen's Choice Program of the Year High Excellence Award	Star King
Netizen's Choice Program of the Year Excellence Award	Family Outing

=== 2009 Awards ===
Category	Winner
Newcomer Award (Comedy category)	Jung Min-kyu
Newcomer Award (Variety category)	Boom; Leeteuk; Eunhyuk
Announcer Award	Park Sun-young
Radio DJ Award	Song Eun-i; Shin Bong-sun; Kim Chang-Ryul
Scriptwriter Award	Choi Mung-young
Lifetime Achievement Award	Jo Young-gu
Producer's Choice Award (TV Star category)	Kim Gook-jin; Yang Jung-a
Producer's Choice Award (MC category)	Kim Jung-eun
Best Teamwork Award	Family Outing
Best Entertainer Award	Kim Gura; Moon Hee-joon
Netizen's Highest Popularity Award	Lee Seung-gi; Lee Hyori
Excellence Comedy Award	Lee Sang-jun; Kim Jong-myung
Excellence Variety Award	Jang Yun-jeong; Jo Hye-ryun; Shin Bong-sun
Best MC Award	Kim Yong-man; Kim Won-hee
Best Program Award	Strong Heart

=== 2010 Awards ===
Category	Winner(s)
Best MC	Lee Seung-gi
Netizens Highest Popularity Award	Lee Seung-gi
Netizens Most Popular Program	Running Man
Program of the Year Award	Star King
Best TV Star Award	Jo Hye-ryun; Shin Bong-sun; Kim Jong-kook
Best Teamwork Award	Heroes
Special Award	Sean Lee
All-round Entertainer Award	Kim Yeong-cheol; Kim Hyo-jin
SBS 20th Anniversary Entertainment 10 Star Award	Lee Hong-ryul; Kang Ho-dong; Lee Young-ja; Yoo Jae-suk; Lee Kyung-kyu; Nam Hee-suk; Lee Bong-won; Shin Dong-yup; Kim Yong-man; Lee Hyori
Producer's Choice Award (MC category)	Kim Gook-jin; Jang Yun-jeong
Newcomer Award	Song Joong-ki; Gary; Lee Kwang-soo; Luna; Minho; Jo Kwon; Yong-hwa; Shindong; IU; Kahi
Special Award in Variety	Kim Byung-se; Song Ji-hyo
Announcer Award	Choi Ki-hwan
Radio DJ Award	Kim Chang-wan
Scriptwriter Award	Kim Yoon-young; Song Jung-yeon

=== 2011 Awards ===
Category	Winner
Newcomer Award (Talk show category)	Han Hye-jin
Newcomer Award (Variety category)	Lee Kwang-soo
Newcomer Award (Comedy category)	Kang Jae-joon
Announcer Award	Kim So-won
Radio DJ Award	Choi Baek-ho; Park So-hyun
Broadcast Writer Award	Park Hyeon-Suk; Choe Gyeong
Special Award	Yuna Kim
Lifetime Achievement Award	Law of the Jungle Team
Best MC picked by Producers	Lee Kyung-kyu
Best Teamwork Award	Star Junior Show
Couple Award	Choi Yang-rak & Paeng Hyun-sook
Best Talk Show Entertainer Award	Paeng Hyun-sook; Shindong; Jeong Joo-ri
Best Variety Entertainer Award	Park Joon-geum; Yoo In-na; Haha
Netizen Best Popularity Award	Lee Seung-gi
Excellence Comedy Award	Son Min-hyuk; Hong Hyun-hee
Excellence Talk Show Award	Boom; Leeteuk; Jo Hye-ryun
Best Variety Entertainer Award	Park Jun-geum; Yoo In-na; Haha
Excellence Variety Award	Song Ji-hyo; Kim Jong-kook
Excellence Award Program (Talk Show)	Strong Heart
Excellence Award Program (Variety)	Pair
Best Excellence Award Program	Running Man
Best Excellence Award (Talk show)	Lee Seung-gi
Excellence Program (Variety)	Kim Byung-man

=== 2012 Awards ===
Category	Winner
Newcomer Award (MC category)	Lee Dong-wook
Newcomer Award (Comedy category)	Kim Won-Gu
Announcer Award	Park Eun-kyung
Radio DJ Award	Cultwo; Park Ji-sun; Park Young-jin
Broadcast Writer Award	Ryu Hye-rin; Kim Mi-kyung; Kim Eun-sun
Special Award	BoA
Lifetime Achievement Award	Kim Sang-joong
Best MC picked by Producers	Yoon Do-hyun
Best Teamwork Award	Jagiya
Couple Award	Shin Dong-yup & Lee Dong-wook
Best Family Award	Jung Eun-pyo, Jung Ji-woon and Jung Ha-eun; Yeom Kyung-hwan and Yeom Eun-ryul; Lee Jung-yong, Lee Mid-eum and Lee Ma-eum
Best Entertainer Award (Talk Show Category)	Boom; Leeteuk
Best Entertainer Award (Variety Category)	Kim Ji-sun; Jeon Hye-bin; Choo Sung-hoon
Excellence Comedy Award	Hong Yoon-hwa; Kim Yong-myung
Excellence Talk Show Award	Han Hye-jin
Excellence Variety Award	Gary; Ji Suk-jin
Viewers' Choice Popularity Award	Yoo Jae-suk
Viewers' Choice Program Award	Running Man
Excellence Program Award (Talk Show Category)	Healing Camp, Aren't You Happy
Excellence Program Award (Variety Category)	K-pop Star 2
Best Excellence Program Award	Law of the Jungle
Best Excellence Award (Comedy Category)	Jung Hyun-soo; Hong Hyun-hee
Best Excellence Award (Talk Show Category)	Lee Kyung-kyu
Best Excellence Award (Variety Show Category)	Kim Byung-man

=== 2013 Awards ===
Category	Winner
Best Excellence Award (Variety category)	Lee Kyung-kyu; Song Ji-hyo
Best Excellence Award (Talk Show category)	Sung Yu-ri; Kim Jong-kook; Haha
Best Excellence Award (Comedy category)	Ahn Siu; Nam Ho-yeon
Newcomer Award (Comedy Category)	Kim Jung-hwan
Newcomer Award (MC Category)	Soo-young
Newcomer Award (Variety Category)	Ham Ik-byung
Best Comedy Corner	Uncle Jong-gyu; Just Because Of Friendship
Announcer Award	Kim Min-ji
Radio DJ Awards	Jung Sun-hee; Noh Sa-yeon; Lee Sung-min
Scriptwriter Award	Jo Jung Eun – Documentary Show (Partners); Joо Gipeum – Variety Show Award (Law Of The Jungle); Kang Eui Mo – Radio Award (Chae Bak Ho's Radio Show)
Services to Society Award	Racing Heart Team
PD Awards: TV sector	Kang Ho-dong
PD Awards: Radio Programs	Cultwo
Best Staff Award	Law of the Jungle Team
Best Couple Award	Lee Hwi-jae & Jang Yun-jeong
Best Teamwork Award	Star Junior Show Team
Best Family Award	Star Couple Show Team
Best Entertainer Award	Park Jun-gyu; Kim Jong-min; Kwanghee
Best Challenge Award	Ahn Jung-hwan; Oh Jong-hyuk
Popularity Award	Kim Sung-soo; Cho Yeo-jeong
Friendship Award	Lee Kwang-soo; Ryu Dam
Excellence Award For Programs Talk Shows	Healing Camp, Aren't You Happy
Excellence Award For Programs Variety Shows	K-pop Star 3
High Excellence Award For Programs	Running Man
Viewers' Choice Popularity Award	Running Man

=== 2014 Awards ===
Category	Winner
High Excellence Award (Variety category)	Kim Jong-kook
High Excellence Award (Talk Show category)	Cultwo
High Excellence Award (Comedy category)	Hong Yoon-hwa; Lee Dong-yeob
Excellence Award (Comedy Category)	Kim Hyun-jung; Jang Hong-jae; Park Young-jae
Excellence Award (Talk Show Category)	Yoon Do-hyun
Excellence Award (Variety Category)	Lee Kwang-soo
Newcomer Award (Variety category)	Jackson
Newcomer Award (Variety category)	Bae Jong-ok
Newcomer Award (Comedy Category)	Choi Baek-sun; Park Jin-joo
Announcer Award	Choi Ki-wan
Radio DJ Award	Gong Hyung-jin; Kim Ji-sun; Kim Ill-joong
Scriptwriter Award	Shin Jin Ju (SBS Special); Shim Eun Ha (Variety Show); Kim Jong Sun (Radio Show)
Special Award	You Hee-yeol
PD Award (TV category)	Sung Yu-ri
PD Award (Radio category)	Kim Chang-wan
Best Teamwork Award	Star Junior Show Team
Best Family Award	Oh! My Baby cast
Best Entertainer Award	Ye Ji-won; Park Jong Chul; Ryu Dam
Best Couple Award	Lee Manki & Choi Wee Duk; Nam Jae Hyun & Lee Chun Ja
Best MC Award	Lim Sung Hoon; Kim Won-hee
New Star Award	Jo Se-ho; Lee Guk-joo; Kim Ill-joong
High Excellence Award for Programs (Talk Shows category)	K-pop Star 4
High Excellence Award for Programs (Variety category)	Law of the Jungle
Excellence Award for Programs (Talk Shows category)	Star King
Excellence Award for Programs (Variety category)	Star Couple Show
Viewer's Choice Best Program	Running Man
Viewer's Choice Most Popular Star Award	Yoo Jae-suk

=== 2015 Awards ===
Category	Winner
Viewers' Choice Best Variety Show	Running Man
Viewers' Choice Popularity Award	Yoo Jae-suk
Programme Excellence Award	Same Bed, Different Dreams
Programme Top Excellence Award (Variety Category)	K-pop Star 5
Programme Top Excellence Award (Talk Show Category)	Star Couple Show
Excellence Award (Variety Category)	Ji Suk-jin
Excellence Award (Talk Show category)	Kim Joon Hyun
Top Excellence Award (Variety Category)	Song Ji-hyo; Kang Gary
Talk Show Award	Kim Won-hee
Comedy Award	Kang Jae-jun
Comedy Excellence Award (Male)	Ahn Shi-woo
Comedy Excellence Award (Female)	Lee Eun-hyung
Newcomer Award (Male)	Seo Jang-hoon
Newcomer Award (Female)	Kim Wan-sun
Newcomer Award (Male)	Oh Min-woo
Newcomer Award (Female)	Park Ji Hyun
Producer Award (TV)	Kim Gura
Producer Award (Radio)	Lee Sook-young
Announcer Award	Bae Sung-jae
Scriptwriter Award	Jung Moon Myeong; Choi Mung-yeong; Kim Yun-hui
Radio DJ Newcomer Award	Jang Ye-won
Radio DJ Award	Lee Guk-joo; Hong Rok-gi
Choice Award	Lee Chunja
Special Award	Kim Sang-joong
Best Couple Award	Kim Gook-jin & Kang Soo-ji
Best Family Award	Oh! My Baby cast
Best Teamwork Award	Shaolin Clenched Fists cast
Best Entertainer Award	Yook Joong-wan; Park Han-byul
Best Challenger Award	Jeong Jinwoon; Goo Hara

=== 2016 Awards ===
Category	Winner	Ref.
Top Excellence Award (Variety)	Lee Kwang-soo	
Top Excellence Award (Talk Show)	Kim Gun-mo	
Top Excellence Award (Comedy)	Hong Yoon-hwa	
Excellence Award (Variety)	Seo Jang-hoon	
Excellence Award (Talk Show)	Jun Hyun-moo, Sung Dae-hyun	
Excellence Award (Comedy)	Kim Jin-gon, Kim Jeong-hwan	
Program of the Year (Variety)	My Little Old Boy	
Program of the Year (Documentary)	Unanswered Questions	
Star of the Year	Park Jin-young	
Best Entertainer Award	Kim Min-seok, Kim Wan, Seolhyun	
Lifetime Achievement Award	Baek Jong-won	
Rookie Award (Female)	Gong Seung-yeon & Yoo Jeong-yeon (Inkigayo), Lee Yeon-soo	
Rookie Award (Male)	Kangnam, Yoo Byung-jae	
Scriptwriter Award	Yook So-young – My Little Old Boy; Park Gi-na – TV Animal Farm; Lee Jae-kuk – Kim Chang Ryul's Old School Radio Show	
PD Award	Park Soo-hong, Kim Joon-hyun	
Radio DJ Award	Park So-hyun	
Best Couple Award	Park Hyung-il & Park Sun-ja, Kim Kwang-kyu & Kim Wan-sun	
Best Friend Award	Flower Crew team	
Variety Show Scene Stealer Award	Choi Sung-kook and Jo Se-ho	
Mobile Icon Award	Yang Se-hyung	
Annoying Guy Award	Lee Kwang-soo	
"Dirty" Award	Tony An	
Turnabout Award	Park Soo-hong	

=== 2017 Awards ===
Category	Winner	Ref.
Top Excellence Award (Variety)	Ji Suk-jin	
Top Excellence Award (Talk Show)	Seo Jang-hoon	
Excellence Award (Variety)	Kang Susie	
Excellence Award (Talk Show)	Tony An; Kim Jun-hyun	
PD Award	Kim Byung-man	
Global Star Award	Running Man	
Lifetime Achievement Award	Baek Jong-won	
Hot Star Award	Choo Ja-hyun & Yu Xiaoguang	
Program of the Year Award (Variety)	My Ugly Duckling	
Program of the Year Award (Documentary)	Finding Genius	
MC Award	Kim Seok-hoon; Jun Hyun-moo	
Scene Steeler Award	Park Myung-soo; Yoon Jung-soo	
Best Entertainer Award	Kim Kwang-kyu; Lee Yoo-ri	
Best Challenge Award	Narsha; Jo Bo-ah; Kim Se-jeong	
Best Teamwork Award	Flaming Youth	
Best Couple Award	Lee Kwang-soo & Jeon So-min	
Scriptwriter Award	Noo Yoon – Same Bed, Different Dreams; Jang Yoon-jung – Curious Stories Y Jeon Jin-shil – Radio Boom Boom Power	
Mobile Icon Award	Park Na-rae; Kim Ki-soo	
Radio DJ Award	Kim Sook & Song Eun-i; Kim Young-chul	
Rookie Award (Variety)	Jeon So-min; Kang Daniel	
Rookie Award (Talk Show)	Lee Sang-min; Jung Jae-eun	

=== 2018 Awards ===
Category	Winner	Ref.
Producer's Award	Kim Jong-kook ("Running Man," "My Little Old Boy")	
Top Excellence Award (Variety)	Jeon So-min ("Running Man")	
Top Excellence Award (Talk/Show)	Yang Se-hyung ("Master in the House", "Village Survival, the Eight")	
Excellence Award (Variety)	Jo Bo-ah ("Baek Jong-won's Alley Restaurant") Yook Sung-jae ("Master in the House")	
Excellence Award (Talk/Show)	So Yi-hyun ("Same Bed, Different Dreams 2: You Are My Destiny") Lee Sang-min ("My Little Old Boy", "Reckless but Happy", "The Fan")	
Popularity Award	Lee Kwang-soo ("Running Man")	
Scene Stealer Award	Seungri ("We Will Channel You", "My Little Old Boy")	
Best Teamwork Award	Running Man	
Best Couple Award	Kim Jong-kook & Hong Jin-young ("Running Man," "My Little Old Boy")	
Program of the Year Award (Variety)	My Little Old Boy	
Best Family Award	In Gyo-jin & So Yi-hyun ("Same Bed, Different Dreams 2: You Are My Destiny")	
Best Challenger Award	Jeon Hye-bin ("Law of the Jungle")	
Screenwriter Award	Yoo Hyun-soo ("Choi Hwa-jung's Powertime") Lee Yoon-joo ("Animal Farm") Kim Myung-jung ("Master in the House")	
Best MC Award	Kim Sung-joo ("Baek Jong-won's Alley Restaurant") Kim Sook ("Same Bed, Different Dreams 2: You Are My Destiny")	
Best Entertainer Award	Im Won-hee ("My Little Old Boy") Goo Bon-seung ("Flaming Youth")	
Mobile Icon Award	JeA Cheetah ("Strong My Way")	
Radio DJ Award	Kim Chang-yeol ("Kim Chang-yeol's Old School") Boom ("Boom Boom Power")	
Rookie Award (Female)	Kang Kyung-hun ("Flaming Youth")	
Rookie Award (Male)	Lee Sang-yoon ("Master in the House")	

=== 2019 Awards ===
Category	Winner	Ref.
Lifetime Achievement Award	Baek Jong-won ("Baek Jong-won's Alley Restaurant")	
Producer's Award	Lee Seung-gi ("Master in the House, Little Forest")	
Top Excellence Award (Reality)	Hong Jin-young ("My Little Old Boy") Kim Jong-kook ("My Little Old Boy, Running Man")	
Top Excellence Award (Show/Variety)	Kim Sung-joo ("Baek Jong-won's Alley Restaurant") Choi Sung-kook ("Flaming Youth")	
Top Excellence in Programming Award	Baek Jong-won's Alley Restaurant	
Excellence Award (Reality)	Kim Hee-chul ("My Little Old Boy, Delicious Rendezvous") Yoon Sang-hyun ("Same Bed, Different Dreams 2: You Are My Destiny")	
Excellence Award (Show/Variety)	Yang Se-chan ("Running Man") Lee Sang-yoon ("Master in the House")	
Excellence in Programming Award (Reality)	Same Bed, Different Dreams 2: You Are My Destiny	
Excellence in Programming Award (Show/Variety)	Flaming Youth	
SNS Star Award	Kangnam & Lee Sang-hwa ("Same Bed, Different Dreams 2: You Are My Destiny") Yook Sung-jae ("Master in the House") Park Na-rae ("Little Forest") Lee Kwang-soo ("Running Man")	
Best Teamwork Award	Master in the House	
Global Program Award	Running Man	
Best Entertainer Award	Haha ("Running Man")	
Honorary Employee Award	Yang Se-hyung ("Master in the House, Delicious Rendezvous, Village Survival, the Eight, We Will Channel You")	
Best Family Award	Lee Yoon-ji ("Same Bed, Different Dreams 2: You Are My Destiny")	
Best Challenge Award	Hur Jae ("Law of the Jungle") Lee Tae-gon ("Law of the Jungle, The Legend of the Big Fish") Kim Dong-jun ("Delicious Rendezvous")	
Best Couple Award	Lee Sang-min & Tak Jae-hoon ("My Little Old Boy")	
Scriptwriter of the Year	Won Ju-won ("Choi Baek-ho Romantic Era") Park Eun-young ("Night of Real Entertainment") Kim Mi-kyung ("Same Bed, Different Dreams 2: You Are My Destiny")	
Radio DJ Award	So Yi-hyun ("Going Home with So Yi-hyun") Bae Sung-jae ("Bae Sung-jae's 10")	
Rookie Award (Female)	Jung In-sun ("Baek Jong-won's Alley Restaurant")	
Rookie Award (Male)	Choi Min-yong ("Flaming Youth")	

=== 2020 Awards ===
Category	Winner	Ref.
Producer's Award	Yang Se-hyung ("Master in the House", "Delicious Rendezvous")	
Top Excellence Award (Reality)	Kim Hee-chul – ("My Little Old Boy", "Delicious Rendezvous"); Lee Sang-min – ("My Little Old Boy")	
Top Excellence Award (Show/Variety)	Haha – ("Running Man"); Jang Yoon-jung – ("K-Trot in Town")	
Top Excellence in Programming Award	My Little Old Boy	
Excellence Award (Show/Variety)	Jang Do-yeon – ("Park Jang's LOL"); Kim Dong-hyun – ("Master in the House")	
Excellence Award (Reality)	Jung In-sun – ("Baek Jong-won's Alley Restaurant"); Kim Kwang-kyu – ("Flaming Youth")	
Excellence in Programming Award	K-Trot in Town; Delicious Rendezvous	
Hot Star Award (OTT)	Lee Seung-gi – ("Master in the House"); Park Na-rae and Jang Do-yeon – ("Park-Jang's LOL")	
Special Legend Award	Lee Sung-mi and Lee Kyung-sil – ("Truth Game"); Lee Bong-won and Choi Yang-rak – ("Good Friends"); Im Sung-hoon – ("Capture the Moment How is that Possible"); Choi Hwa-jung – ("Choi Hwa-jung's Power Time"); Lee Hong-ryul – ("Lee Hong-ryul Show")	
Global Content Award	Running Man; Law of Jungle	
Best Couple Award	Im Won-hee and Jung Suk-yong – ("My Little Old Boy")	
Entertainer of the Year Award	Shin Sung-rok – ("Master in the House"); Park Sun-young – ("Flaming Youth")	
Best Teamwork Award	Same Bed, Different Dreams 2: You Are My Destiny Team	
SBS Honorary Employee Award	Seo Jang-hoon – ("My Little Old Boy, Handsome Tigers and Same Bed, Different Dreams 2: You Are My Destiny")	
Public Interest Variety Award	Kim Sung-joo – ("Baek Jong-won's Alley Restaurant")	
Screenwriter of the Year (Variety)	Lee Hae-yeon – ("The Story of the Day When One Bites One's Tail"); Yook So-young – ("My Little Old Boy" and "K-Trot in Town"); Hwang Bo-kyung – ("Baek Jong-won's Alley Restaurant" and "Delicious Rendezvous")	
Scene Stealer Award	Tak Jae-hoon – ("'My Little Old Boy")	
Radio DJ Award	Kim Chang-wan – ("This Beautiful Morning, This Is Kim Chang-wan")	
Rookie DJ Award	Heo Ji-woong – ("Heo Ji-woong Show")	
Rookie Award	Jessi – ("SBS Mobidic: Showterview with Jessi"); Cha Eun-woo – ("Master in the House"); Oh Min-seok – ("My Little Old Boy")	

=== 2021 Awards ===
Category	Winner	Ref.
Producer's Award	Lee Seung-gi (Master in the House)	
Top Excellence Award (Reality)	Tak Jae-hoon – (My Little Old Boy, Dolsing Fourmen, Tiki-taCAR)	
Top Excellence Award (Variety)	Yang Se-chan – (Running Man)	
Top Excellence Award (Show/Sports)	Park Sun-yeong – (Kick a Goal)	
Top Excellence in Programming Award (Show/Sports Category)	Kick a Goal	
Top Excellence in Programming Award (Variety Category)	Running Man	
Excellence Award (Reality)	Lee Ji-hye – (Same Bed, Different Dreams 2: You Are My Destiny)	
Excellence Award (Talk/Variety)	Kim Joon-ho and Im Won-hee – (My Little Old Boy, Dolsing Fourmen)	
Excellence Award (Show/Sports)	Kick a Goal S1 cast	
Excellence in Programming Award (Show/Sports)	Archive K Loud	
Excellence in Programming Award (Talk/Variety)	Dolsing Fourmen	
Best Teamwork Award	Master in the House team	
Coach Award	Kick a Goal S1 Coaches	
Special Award	Baek Jong-won's Alley Restaurant	
Honorary Employee Award	Jee Seok-jin – (Running Man)	
Entertainer of the Year	Shin Dong-yup – (My Little Old Boy, TV Animal Farm, I Need a Warm-up) Tak Jae-hoon – (My Little Old Boy, Dolsing Fourmen) Lee Sang-min – (My Little Old Boy, Dolsing Fourmen) Lee Kyung-gyu – (Golf Battle: Birdie Buddies) Lee Seung-gi – (Master in the House, Golf Battle: Birdie Buddies, Loud) Park Sun-yeong – (Kick a Goal) Yoo Jae-suk – (Running Man) Jee Seok-jin – (Running Man) Kim Jong-kook – (Running Man, My Little Old Boy) Kim Gu-ra – (Same Bed, Different Dreams 2: You Are My Destiny) Seo Jang-hoon – (My Little Old Boy, Same Bed, Different Dreams 2: You Are My Destiny) Yang Se-hyung – (Master in the House)	
Best Couple Award	Lee Soo-geun and Bae Seung-jae – (Kick a Goal)	
Scriptwriter of the Year	Hwang Chae-young – (Unanswered Questions) Yang Hyo-im – (Running Man) Jang Jung-hee – (Kick a Goal) Kim Yoon-hee – (Kim Young-chul's Power FM)	
Radio DJ Award (Power FM)	Boom – (Boom Boom Power)	
Radio DJ Award (Love FM)	Lee Sook-young – Lee Sook-young Love FM	
Rookie DJ Award	Park Ha-sun – (Park Ha-sun's Cine Town)	
Rookie Award (Show/Sports)	Lee Seung-yuop – (Golf Battle: Birdie Buddies)	
Rookie Award (Variety)	Keum Sae-rok – (Baek Jong-won's Alley Restaurant)	
Rookie Award (Reality)	Park Goon – (My Little Old Boy, Law of Jungle) Lee Hyun-yi – (Same Bed, Different Dreams 2: You Are My Destiny, Kick a Goal)	
Next Level Award	Jang Do-yeon – (The Story of the Day When One Bites One's Tail)	

=== 2022 Awards ===
Category	Winner	Ref.
Producer's Award	Tak Jae-hoon (My Little Old Boy, Dolsing Fourmen)	
Top Excellence Award (Talk and Reality)	Kim Joon-ho - (My Little Old Boy, Dolsing Fourmen)	
Top Excellence Award (Show and Sports)	Lee Hyun-yi - (Kick a Goal)	
Top Excellence Award (Show/Sports)	Chae Ri-na - (Kick a Goal	
Excellence Award (Talk/Reality)	Heo Kyung-hwan - (My Little Old Boy)	
Excellence Award (Show/Sports)	Chae Ri-na - (Kick a Goal)	
Program of the Year Award (Variety)	Running Man	
Program of the Year Award (Talk/ Reality)	My Little Old Boy	
Excellence in Programming Award (Show/Sports)	Kick a Goal	
Lifetime Achievement Award	Lee Sang-min - (My Little Old Boy, Dolsing Fourmen)	
Best Teamwork Award	Same Bed, Different Dreams 2: You Are My Destiny team	
Leader of the Year Award	Kick a Goal Team Leaders	
Popularity Award	Bae Sung-jae - (Kick a Goal) Kick a Goal S3 Team Leader	
Honorary Employee Award	Lee Sang-min - (My Little Old Boy, Dolsing Fourmen)	
Best Character Award	Lee Kyung-kyu - (Golf Battle: Birdie Buddies)	
Best Couple Award	Yoo Jae-suk, Kim Jong-kook - (Running Man)	
Scriptwriter of the Year (Liberal Arts)	Seo In-hee - (The Story of the Day When One Bites One's Tail)	
Scriptwriter of the Year (Entertainment)	Kang Seung-hee - (Dolsing Fourmen)	
Scriptwriter of the Year (Radio)	Jo Hye-jung - (Bae Sung-jae's Ten)	
Radio DJ Award (Power FM)	Wendy - (Wendy's Young Street)	
Radio DJ Award (Love FM)	Yoon Soo-hyun - (Yoon Soo-hyun's Diverse World)	
Rookie Award	Ha Seok-ju and Yoon Tae-jin - (Kick a Goal)	
Eco-brity Award	Kim Byung-man - (The Law of Symbiosis)	
Social Star Award (Talk/Reality)	Im Chang-jung and Seo Ha-yan - (Same Bed, Different Dreams 2: You Are My Destiny)	
Social Star Award (Show/Sports)	Yoo Hyun-ju - (Golf Battle: Birdie Buddies)	
Scene Stealer Award	Jung Hye-in - (Kick a Goal) Im Won-hee - (My Little Old Boy, Dolsing Fourmen)	
2022 SBS's Daughter and Son	Lee Hyun-yi - (Kick a Goal, Same Bed, Different Dreams 2: You Are My Destiny, DNA Singers) Kim Joon-ho - (My Little Old Boy, Dolsing Fourmen)	
Tiki-Taka of the Year Award	Kyoungseo and Seogi - (Kick a Goal)	

=== 2023 Awards ===
Category	Winner	Ref.
Producer Award	Jee Seok-jin - Running Man	
Program of the Year Award	Running Man	
Top Excellence Award Male	• Kim Jong-min - My Little Old Boy, Golf Battle: Birdie Buddies • Bae Sung-jae- Kick a Goal	
Top Excellence Award Female	Lee Ji-hye - Same Bed, Different Dreams 2: You Are My Destiny	
Excellence Award Male	Oh Sang-jin - Same Bed, Different Dreams 2: You Are My Destiny	
Excellence Award Female	Song Hae-na - Kick a Goal	
Yashin Award	Kisum - Kick a Goal	
Honorary Employee Award	Im Won-hee - My Little Old Boy	
Good Influence Program Award	Same Bed, Different Dreams 2: You Are My Destiny	
Century Club Award	Jo Hye-ryun, Lee Hyun-i, Jung Hye-in, Kim Min-kyung, Oh Na-mi, Song Hae-na, Ahn Hye-kyung, Saori - Kick a Goal	
Puskás Award	Kim Seung-hye - Kick a Goal	
Rookie Award	• Kim Ji-eun - Neighbourhood Restaurant, Inkigayo • Shin Ji-ru - Meokjjibba: Big Survival	
Radio DJ (Power FM)	DinDin - Din Din's Music High	
Radio DJ (Love FM)	Ji Sang-ryeol - If It's Hot, It's Ji Sang-ryeol	
Best Couple Award	• Lee Jang-won & Bae Da-hae - Same Bed, Different Dreams 2: You Are My Destiny • Lee Eul-yong & Baek Ji-hoon - Kick a Goal	
Scriptwriter Award (Liberal Art)	Oh Yoo-kyung - Unanswered Questions	
Scriptwriter Award (Entertainment)	Kim Sae-yeon - My Little Old Boy	
Scriptwriter Award (Radio)	Hong Eun-hye - If It's Hot, It's Ji Sang-ryeol	
Gourmet Star Award	Park Na-rae - Meokjjibba: Big Survival	
Special Award	Yoo Jung-soo - Neighbourhood Restaurant	
Eco-Celebrity Award	Cha In-pyo, Jung Sang-hoon, Ryu Soo-young, Jason - Green Fathers' Association - Husbands Next Door	
Best Team Work Award	Meokjjibba: Big Survival	
Scene Stealer Award	Yang Se-chan - Running Man	
2023 SBS's Son	Lee Sang-min - My Little Old Boy	
2023 SBS's Daughter	Lee Hyun-yi - Kick a Goal, Same Bed, Different Dreams 2: You Are My Destiny, Fantastic Family - DNA Singer	
Hot Issue Award	Lee Dong-gun - My Little Old Boy	
Rising Star Award	• Kim Gun-woo - My Little Old Boy • Rom Ji-yoon - Strong Heart VS • Son Dong-pyo - Neighbourhood Cool House	
The Most Short Clip Views Award	Kim Jong-kook - Running Man, My Little Old Boy	
Golden Solo Award	Tak Jae-hoon, Im Won-hee, Lee Sang-min, Kim Joon-ho - Dolsing Fourmen	

=== 2024 Awards ===
Category	Winner	Ref.
Producer Award	Lee Sang-min - My Little Old Boy, Shoes Off, and Single for Men	
Program of the Year Award (Most Popular Program)	Running Man	
Program of the Year Award (Highest Viewership Program)	My Little Old Boy	
Top Excellence Award (Male)	• Kim Seung-soo - My Little Old Boy • Ryu Soo-young - Jungle Bob	
Top Excellence Award (Female)	Jung Hye-in – Kick a Goal	
Excellence Award (Male)	• Choi Jin-hyuk - My Little Old Boy • Jo Woo-jong - Same Bed, Different Dreams 2: You Are My Destiny	
Excellence Award (Female)	Uee – Jungle Bob	
Honorary Employee Award	Kim Jun-ho - My Little Old Boy	
Good Family Award	Same Bed, Different Dreams 2: You Are My Destiny	
Good Partner Award	Kim Jong-kook, Lee Dong-gun, Heo Kyung-hwan, and Kim Hee-chul – My Little Old Boy	
Rookie Award (Talk/Reality)	Yoo Yeon-seok - Whenever Possible	
Rookie Award (Show/Variety)	Jin Seon-gyu - The Magic Star	
Radio DJ Power FM	Bong Tae-gyu - This Beautiful Morning, It's Bong Tae-gyu	
Radio DJ Love FM	Jeong Yeop - Your Night, It's Jeong Yeop	
Best Couple Award	Kim Min-jae & Choi Yoo-ra	
Broadcast Writer Award	Im Chae-yoon - Hot Place When Touched! Neighborhood Cool House	
Best Entertainer Award	Im Won-hee - My Little Old Boy	
ESG Award	Hot Place When Touched! Neighborhood Cool House	
Special Award	Lee Young-pyo – Kick a Goal	
Best Chemistry Award	Park Na-rae, Shin Gi-ru, Lee Guk-joo, & Pung Ja - Size Survival - Muk-jji-ppa	
Scene Stealer Award	Song Ji-hyo - Running Man	
2024 SBS's Son	Lee Sang-min - My Little Old Boy, Shoes Off, and Single for Men	
2024 SBS's Daughter	Lee Hyun-yi - Kick a Goal, Same Bed, Different Dreams 2: You Are My Destiny	
Hot Issue Award	Yoo Ho-jin – The Magic Star	
Rising Star Award	Kang Hoon, Ji Ye-eun - Running Man	
The Most Short Clip Views Award	Kim Jong-kook - Running Man, My Little Old Boy	
Best Player Award	Park Ji-an and Heo Kyung-hee - Goal Time Girl	

=== 2025 Awards ===
Category	Winner	Ref.
Producer Award	• Yang Se-chan - RunningMan • Jun Hyun-moo - Jungle Bob, Wow! Really? I Can't Belive it, The Ballad of Us	
Program of the Year Award	RunningMan	
Top Excellence Award (Male)	• Choi Jin-hyuk - My Little Old Boy • Kim Kwang-kyu, Lee Seo-jin - My Grumpy Secretary	
Top Excellence Award (Female)	• Lee Hyun-yi - Kick a Goal, Same Bed, Different Dreams 2: You Are My Destiny • Kim Jin-kyung - Kick a Goal	
Excellence Award (Male)	• Yoon Si-yoon - My Little Old Boy • Yoo Yeon-seok - Whenever Possible	
Excellence Award (Female)	• Ji Ye-eun - RunningMan • Park Ha-yan - Kick a Goal	
Merit Award	Lee Kyung-kyu - My Turn	
The Face of SBS Selected by AI	Yoo Jae-suk - RunningMan, Whenever Possible	
Trending Program Award	The Ballad of Us	
Special Award	HaHa - RunningMan	
Best Team Work Award	Same Bed, Different Dreams 2: You Are My Destiny	
Best Entertainer Award	Yoon Hyun-min - My Little Old Boy	
Hot Clip Award	Cha Tae-hyun - The Ballad of Us	
Challenge of the Year Award	Im Won-hee, Kim Seung-soo, Heo Kyung-hwan - My Little Old Boy	
Best Couple Award	Yoo Jae-suk & Yoo Yeon-seok - Whenever Possible	
ESG Award	Lim Young-woong - Little Island Big Hero	
Positive Influence Award	Cho Young-nam & Jung Eun-hye - Same Bed, Different Dreams 2: You Are My Destiny	
Scene Stealer Award	Tak Jae-hoon & Choo Sung-hoon - My Turn	
Scriptwriter Award	Mo Eun-seol - The Ballad of Us	
Radio DJ Award	Hwang Je-seong - Hwang Je-seong's Emperor Power	
Rookie UP Award	Lee Chae-yeon - Kick a Goal	
Rookie Award (Male)	Kim Won-hoon - My Turn	
Rookie Award (Female)	Lee Soo-jin - My Turn	

== Hosts ==
Ep. #	Year	MC	Ref.
1	2007	Ryu Si-won, Park Eun-kyung, Uhm Ji-won	
2	2008	Lee Hwi-jae, Shin Bong-sun, Ye Ji-won	
3	2009	Shin Dong-yup, Hyun Young, Lee So-yeon	
4	2010	Shin Dong-yup, Park Sun-young, Jang Yun-jeong	
5	2011	Kim Yong-man, Kim Won-hee, Shin Bong-sun	
6	2012	Haha, Yoon Do-hyun, Choi Soo-young	
7	2013	Shin Dong-yup, Kim Won-hee, Krystal Jung	
8	2014	Bae Sung-jae, Lee Kyung-kyu, Sung Yu-ri	
9	2015	Lee Kyung-kyu, Jun Hyun-moo, Jang Ye-won	
10	2016	Kang Ho-dong, Lee Kyung-kyu, Lee Si-young	
11	2017	Jun Hyun-moo, Lee Sang-min, Choo Ja-hyun	
12	2018	Kim Jong-kook, Park Soo-hong, Han Go-eun	
13	2019	Kim Sung-joo, Park Na-rae, Jo Jeong-sik	
14	2020	Shin Dong-yup, Cha Eun-woo, Lee Seung-gi	
15	2021	Lee Seung-gi, Jang Do-yeon, Han Hye-jin	
16	2022	Tak Jae-hoon, Jang Do-yeon and Lee Hyun-yi	
17	2023	Lee Sang-min, Kim Ji-eun and Lee Hyun-yi	
18	2024	Jun Hyun-moo, Jang Do-yeon and Lee Hyun-yi	
19	2025	Jun Hyun-moo, Cha Tae-hyun and Lee Su-ji	

== Controversy ==
SBS and the Entertainment Award itself was under negative criticism for their decisions to not giving Main Daesang to Ji Seok Jin, as he was heavily favored to win it in the recent years for his long career and contributions on entertainment industry.

== Ratings ==
Airdate	TNmS		AGB	
Airdate	Republic of Korea	Seoul	Republic of Korea	Seoul
December 28, 2007	14.9% (part 1); 16.0% (part 2)	15.4% (part 1); 16.5% (part 2)	13.1% (part 1); 13.5% (part 2)	13.6% (part 1); 13.2% (part 2)
December 30, 2008	18.3% (part 1); 21.2% (part 2)	19.1% (part 1); 21.8% (part 2)	17.1% (part 1); 21.4% (part 2)	17.7% (part 1); 21.6% (part 2)
December 30, 2009	20.9% (part 1); 22.0% (part 2)	20.9% (part 1); 21.8% (part 2)	19.3% (part 1); 21.1% (part 2)	20.8% (part 1); 21.8% (part 2)
December 30, 2010	15.9% (part 1); 16.6% (part 2)	16.0% (part 1); 16.4% (part 2)	17.9% (part 1); 19.6% (part 2)	19.4% (part 1); 20.2% (part 2)
December 30, 2011	12.4% (part 1); 13.0% (part 2)	14.1% (part 1); 14.6% (part 2)	13.4% (part 1); 15.6% (part 2)	14.3% (part 1); 17.5% (part 2)
December 30, 2012	9.1% (part 1); 15.2% (part 2)	9.8% (part 1); 16.8% (part 2)	8.5% (part 1); 16.3% (part 2)	9.2% (part 1); 17.9% (part 2)
December 30, 2013	9.6% (part 1); 10.5% (part 2)	11.6% (part 1); 13.0% (part 2)	10.5% (part 1); 12.2% (part 2)	11.4% (part 1); 13.4% (part 2)
December 30, 2014	9.1% (part 1); 11.0% (part 2)	11.0% (part 1); 13.2% (part 2)	9.2% (part 1); 11.5% (part 2)	10.1% (part 1); 13.0% (part 2)
December 30, 2015	7.6% (part 1); 9.8% (part 2)	8.3% (part 1); 10.9% (part 2)	9.2% (part 1); 10.6% (part 2)	10.1% (part 1); 11.6% (part 2)
December 25, 2016	9.2% (part 1); 7.3% (part 2)	10.4% (part 1); 9.3% (part 2)	9.9% (part 1); 7.8% (part 2)	10.1% (part 1); 8.7% (part 2)
December 30, 2017	13.0% (part 1); 13.1% (part 2)	13.6% (part 1); 14.2% (part 2)	13.1% (part 1); 13.8% (part 2)	14.1% (part 1); 14.6% (part 2)
December 28, 2018	10.1% (part 1); 11.6% (part 2)	—N/a	11.8% (part 1); 11.9% (part 2)	12.0% (part 1); 12.6% (part 2)
December 28, 2019	—N/a	—N/a	8.4% (part 1); 12.7% (part 2)	8.5% (part 1); 13.1% (part 2)
December 19, 2020	6.0% (part 1); 7.2% (part 2); 5.8% (part 3)	—N/a	6.5% (part 1); 6.8% (part 2); 5.5% (part 3)	6.6% (part 1); 7.3% (part 2); 6.2% (part 3)
December 18, 2021	5.3% (part 1); 5.6% (part 2)	—N/a	5.0% (part 1); 6.3% (part 2)	5.3% (part 1); 6.7% (part 2)
December 17, 2022	—N/a	—N/a	4.8%(part 1); 4.5%(part 2); 5.5% (part 3)	5.1%(part 1); 4.9%(part 2); 6.3% (part 3)
December 30, 2024	—N/a	—N/a	6.0% (Part 1); 7.5% (Part 2); 6.3% (Part 3)	6.5% (Part 1); 8.0% (Part 2); 7.1% (Part
January 29, 2025	—N/a	—N/a	3.5%(Part 1); 3.7%(Part 2)	3.9%(Part 1); 4.4% (Part 2)
December 30, 2025	—N/a	—N/a	4.1% (Part 1); 3.9% (Part 2); 5.0% (Part 3)	3.9%(Part 1); 3.8%(Part 2); 5.1% (Part 3)
The blue numbers represent the lowest ratings and the red numbers represent the highest ratings.; N/A denotes that the rating is not known.

== See also ==
- List of Asian television awards
