= We Will Channel You =

- Promotional Poster
- Also known as: I'll Win You Over with My Channel
- Genre: Reality television Talk Show
- Starring: Kang Ho-dong; Yang Se-hyung; Kim Jong-min; So Yoo-jin
- Country of origin: South Korea
- Original language: Korean
- No. of seasons: 1
- No. of episodes: 24

Production
- Production location: South Korea
- Running time: 80 minutes

Original release
- Network: SBS
- Release: 25 September 2018 – 9 May 2019

We Will Channel You (Korean: 가로채널) is a South Korean television program that aired on SBS every Thursday at 23:10 (KST) beginning on November 15, 2018, and ended on May 9, 2019. A pilot episode, as a Chuseok special, was aired on September 25, 2018 at 23:00 (KST).

On February 25, 2019, it was confirmed that Kim Jong-min and So Yoo-jin would join the fixed cast of the show.

== Overview ==
The program mainly focuses on celebrities becoming video contents creators, making their own videos based on their own themes. They will also observe these created videos and the production processes of their own videos in the studio.

Starting from episode 15, the program is reformatted to a talk show with 2 fixed segments, with one being hosted by Kang Ho-dong and Yang Se-hyung, the other hosted by Kim Jong-min and So Yoo-jin.

== Cast ==
=== Current ===
- Kang Ho-dong (Pilot episode, Regular episodes 1-23)
- Yang Se-hyung (Pilot episode, Regular episodes 1-23)
- Kim Jong-min (Regular episodes 15-23)
- So Yoo-jin (Regular episodes 15-23)

=== Former ===
- Lee Young-ae (Pilot episode)
- Ddotty (Regular episodes 1-10)
- Seungri (Big Bang) (Regular episodes 1-12)

== Channels opened ==
| Celebrity(s) | Channel name | Episode(s) shown |
|---|---|---|
| Kang Ho-dong | Kang Ho-dong's Negligible Battle (강호동의 하찮은 대결) | Pilot, 1-14 |
| Yang Se-hyung | Yang Se-hyung's Eateries Account Book (양세형의 맛집 장부) | Pilot, 1, 3-4, 6-7, 11-14 |
| Lee Young-ae | My Little Pretty Kids (예쁜 우리 새끼) | Pilot |
| AOA (Seolhyun, Chanmi) | Seol-Chan Camping (설찬리 캠핑 중) | 1-3 |
| Choi Min-soo | My World Is Just That (그것만이 내 세상) | 4-5 |
| Seungri | Seungri's Glorious Return TV (승리의 금의환향TV) | 9-10 |
| Blackpink | Blackpink Channel (블랙핑크 채널) | 6, 14 (Note: In episode 6 the video was titled "The Slightly Mysterious Pet Dictionary" (약간 신비한 반려동물 사전), while in episode 14 the video is titled "Gold Hands TV (금손TV)") |
| Kang Ho-dong, Yang Se-hyung | Strong Gym (막강해짐) | 15-23 |
| Kim Jong-min, So Yoo-jin | The More Talk The Better (다다익설) | 15-23 |

== Episodes ==
=== 2018 ===
| Ep.# | Broadcast Date | Studio Guest(s) | Video Guest(s) | Note(s) |
|---|---|---|---|---|
| Pilot | September 25 | —N/a | Kang Ho-dong's video: Seungri; Yang Se-hyung's video: Lee Yong-jae, Jessi; Lee Young-ae's video: Jeong Seung-kwon, Jeong Seung-bin (children of Lee Young-ae) | |
| 1 | November 15 | —N/a | Kang Ho-dong's video: Lee Si-young, Seungri; Yang Se-hyung's video: Lee Yeon-bok | |
| 2 | November 22 | AOA (Seolhyun, Chanmi) | Kang Ho-dong's video: Kim Dong-hyun | |
| 3 | November 29 | 1st half: Choi Min-soo, Twice (Sana, Dahyun); 2nd half: AOA (Seolhyun, Chanmi) | Kang Ho-dong's video: Henry; Yang Se-hyung's video: Huh Young-man | |
| 4 | December 6 | 1st half: Lee Si-young; 2nd half: Choi Min-soo, Twice (Sana, Dahyun) | Kang Ho-dong's video: Lee Si-young; Yang Se-hyung's video: Huh Young-man | |
| 5 | December 13 | 1st part: Lee Si-young; 2nd part: Choi Min-soo, Twice (Sana, Dahyun); 3rd part: Blackpink | Kang Ho-dong's video: Lee Si-young | |
| 6 | December 20 | Blackpink | Kang Ho-dong's video: Kim Jong-kook | Special voice appearance by Baek Jong-won in Yang Se-hyung's video |
| 7 | December 27 | Hwang Kwang-hee (ZE:A), Red Velvet (Irene, Seulgi) | Kang Ho-dong's video: Hwang Kwang-hee (ZE:A), Song Min-ho (WINNER), Yoshihiro Akiyama, Jennie (Blackpink) | Special voice appearance by Baek Jong-won in Yang Se-hyung's video |

=== 2019 ===
| Ep.# | Broadcast Date | Studio Guest(s) | Video Guest(s) | Note(s) |
|---|---|---|---|---|
| 8 | January 3 | Hwang Kwang-hee (ZE:A), Red Velvet (Irene, Seulgi) | Kang Ho-dong's video: Park Hang-seo, Bae Sung-jae | |
| 9 | January 10 | 1st half: GFriend (Eunha, SinB, Umji); 2nd half: Hwang Kwang-hee (ZE:A), Red Velvet (Irene, Seulgi) | Kang Ho-dong's video: Park Hang-seo, Bae Sung-jae | |
| 10 | January 17 | 1st half: Hwang Kwang-hee (ZE:A), Red Velvet (Irene, Seulgi); 2nd half: Blackpink | Kang Ho-dong's video: Seo Jang-hoon, Cha Eun-woo (Astro), Moon Se-yoon, Bae Sung-jae and SBS announcers Kim Min-hyung, Kim Soo-min and Jo Jung-seok | |
| 11 | January 24 | —N/a (Note: Seungri's flat is being used as the studio) | Kang Ho-dong's video: Lee Man-ki; Yang Se-hyung's video: Oh Se-deuk | Special appearance by announcer Park Sun-young |
| 12 | January 31 | —N/a | Kang Ho-dong's video: Song Min-ho (WINNER), P.O (Block B); Yang Se-hyung's video: Oh Se-deuk | |
| 13 | February 7 | —N/a (Note: None of the scenes from the studio had been shown in this episode) | Kang Ho-dong's video: U-Know Yunho (TVXQ); Yang Se-hyung's video: Hooni Kim | |
| 14 | February 14 | Blackpink | Kang Ho-dong's video: Irene (Red Velvet); Yang Se-hyung's video: Hooni Kim | |
| — | No broadcast on February 21 due to reformatting of program | | | |
| Ep.# | Broadcast Date | Guest for Strong Gym | Guest(s) for The More Talk The Better | Note(s) |
| — | No broadcast on February 28 due to the broadcast relay of 2019 North Korea–United States Hanoi Summit | | | |
| 15 | March 7 | Choi Jin-hyuk | Shim Yong-hwan, Jun Bum-sun, Thomas Emulgudner | Special appearance by Oh Ah-rin |
| 16 | March 14 | Kim Yeong-cheol | Shim Yong-hwan, Jun Bum-sun, Thomas Emulgudner | |
| 17 | March 21 | Hwasa (Mamamoo) | Shim Yong-hwan, Jun Bum-sun, Thomas Emulgudner | Special voice appearance by Baek Jong-won |
| 18 | March 28 | Oh Dae-hwan | Shim Yong-hwan, Jun Bum-sun, Thomas Emulgudner | |
| 19 | April 4 | Kwon Yul | Shim Yong-hwan, Jun Bum-sun, Anton Scholz, Jo Dong-chan | |
| 20 | April 11 | Lee Tae-gon | Shim Yong-hwan, Jun Bum-sun, Anton Scholz, Jo Dong-chan | Special video appearance by Baek Jong-won |
| 21 | April 18 | Lee Tae-gon, Ji Sang-ryeol | Shim Yong-hwan, Jun Bum-sun, Kim Chil-doo, Kim Young-ja, Im Won-chul | |
| — | No broadcast on April 25 due to the broadcast of The Fiery Priest special show | | | |
| 22 | May 2 | Ko Kyu-pil, Um Mun-suk, Ahn Chang-hwan | Shim Yong-hwan, Jun Bum-sun, Kim Chil-doo, Kim Young-ja, Im Won-chul | |
| 23 | May 9 | Oh Eun-young | Shim Yong-hwan, Jun Bum-sun | |

== Ratings ==
- In the ratings below, the highest rating for the show will be in red, and the lowest rating for the show will be in blue each year.
- NR denotes that the show did not rank in the top 20 daily programs on that date.

=== 2018 ===
| Ep. | Broadcast Date | AGB Ratings | |
| Ep. | Broadcast Date | Part 1 | Part 2 |
|---|---|---|---|
| Pilot | September 25 | 4.6% | 4.8% |
| 1 | November 15 | 1.8% | 1.9% |
| 2 | November 22 | 1.8% | 1.3% |
| 3 | November 29 | 2.2% | 2.3% |
| 4 | December 6 | 2.6% | 2.5% |
| 5 | December 13 | 2.7% | 2.6% |
| 6 | December 20 | 3.5% | 3.0% |
| 7 | December 27 | 4.7% | 3.7% |

=== 2019 ===
| Ep. | Broadcast Date | AGB Ratings | |
| Ep. | Broadcast Date | Part 1 | Part 2 |
|---|---|---|---|
| 8 | January 3 | 4.7% | 5.5% |
| 9 | January 10 | 4.2% | 3.7% |
| 10 | January 17 | 3.8% | 3.8% |
| 11 | January 24 | 3.2% | 4.2% |
| 12 | January 31 | 2.8% | 2.3% |
| 13 | February 7 | 1.7% | 1.9% |
| 14 | February 14 | 2.1% | 2.1% |
| 15 | March 7 | 1.9% | 1.9% |
| 16 | March 14 | 2.2% | 2.3% |
| 17 | March 21 | 1.2% | 1.9% |
| 18 | March 28 | 1.9% | 2.3% |
| 19 | April 4 | 1.2% | 1.1% |
| 20 | April 11 | 1.5% | 2.4% |
| 21 | April 18 | 1.9% | 1.8% |
| 22 | May 2 | 3.1% | 2.5% |
| 23 | May 9 | 2.4% | 2.4% |

== Awards and nominations ==
| Year | Award | Category | Recipient(s) | Result | Ref. |
|---|---|---|---|---|---|
| 2018 | 12th SBS Entertainment Awards | Top Excellence Award (Show/Talk) | Yang Se-hyung | Won | |
| 2018 | 12th SBS Entertainment Awards | Scene Stealer Award | Seungri | Won | |
| 2018 | 12th SBS Entertainment Awards | Best Entertainer Award | Seungri | Nominated | |
| 2019 | 13th SBS Entertainment Awards | Honorary Employee Award | Yang Se-hyung | Won | |
