= 2019 SBS Entertainment Awards =

13th edition of award ceremony

- Date: December 28, 2019
- Site: SBS Prism Tower, Sangam-dong, Mapo-gu, Seoul
- Hosted by: Kim Sung-joo; Park Na-rae; Jo Jeong-sik

Television coverage
- Network: SBS
- Duration: 230 minutes
- Viewership: 8.4% (part 1); 12.7% (part 2)

The 2019 SBS Entertainment Awards (Korean: SBS 연예대상; RR: SBS Yeon-ye Daesang) presented by Seoul Broadcasting System (SBS), took place on December 28, 2019, at SBS Prism Tower in Sangam-dong, Mapo-gu, Seoul. It was hosted by Kim Sung-joo, Park Na-rae and Jo Jeong-sik. The nominees were chosen from SBS variety, talk and comedy shows that aired from December 2018 to November 2019.

== Nominations and winners ==
(Winners denoted in bold)

Grand Prize (Daesang)
**Yoo Jae-suk** – **Running Man**; Paik jong-won - Paik jong-won's Alley Restaurant; Shin Dong-yup - My Little Old Boy; Kim Jong-kook - Running Man and My Little Old Boy; Kim Gura - E-News Exclusive; Kim Byung-man - Law of the Jungle; Seo Jang-hoon - My Little Old Boy; Lee Seung-gi - Master in the House
Top Excellence in Programming Award	Honorary Employee Award
**Paik jong-won's Alley Restaurant**	**Yang Se-hyung** **– Master in the House, Delicious Rendezvous, Village Survival, the Eight, We Will Channel You**
Top Excellence Award in Reality Category	Top Excellence Award in Show/Variety Category
**Hong Jin-young – My Little Old Boy**; **Kim Jong-kook – Running Man, My Little Old Boy**	**Kim Sung-joo – Paik jong-won's Alley Restaurant**; **Choi Sung-kook – The Fab Singles**
Excellence Award in Reality Category	Excellence Award in Show/Variety Category
**Kim Hee-chul – My Little Old Boy, Delicious Rendezvous**; **Yoon Sang-hyun – Same Bed, Different Dreams 2: You Are My Destiny**	**Yang Se-chan – Running Man**; **Lee Sang-yoon – Master in the House**
Excellence Program Award in Reality Category	Excellence Program Award in Show/Variety Category
**Same Bed, Different Dreams 2: You Are My Destiny**	**The Fab Singles**
Rookie Award in Male Category	Rookie Award in Female Category
**Choi Min-yong – The Fab Singles**	**Jung In-sun – Paik jong-won's Alley Restaurant**
Producer's Award	Lifetime Achievement Award
**Lee Seung-gi – Master in the House, Little Forest**	**Paik jong-won – Paik jong-won's Alley Restaurant**
Best Entertainer Award	Best Challenge Award
**Haha – Running Man**	**Hur Jae** **– Law of the Jungle**; **Lee Tae-gon** **– Law of the Jungle, Legendary Big Fish**; **Kim Dong-jun – Delicious Rendezvous**
Best Teamwork Award	Best Couple Award
**Masters in the House**	**Lee Sang-min and Tak Jae-hoon – My Little Old Boy**
Scriptwriter of the Year	SNS Star Award
**Won Ju-won – Choi Baek-ho's Romantic Era**; **Park Eun-young – E-News Exclusive**; **Kim Mi-kyung – Same Bed, Different Dreams 2: You Are My Destiny**	**Park Na-rae** **– Little Forest**; **Lee Kwang-soo** **– Running Man**; **Yook Sung-jae** **– Master in the House**; **Kangnam and Lee Sang-hwa – Same Bed, Different Dreams 2: You Are My Destiny**
Radio DJ Award	Best Family Award
**So Yi-hyun – Going Home with So Yi-hyun**; **Bae Sung-jae – Bae Sung-jae's 10**	**Lee Yoon-ji – Same Bed, Different Dreams 2: You Are My Destiny**
Global Programme Award
**Running Man**

== Presenters ==
Order	Presenter	Award	Ref.
1	Hur Jae, Yoo Jae-suk	Rookie Award in Male and Female Category	
2	Boom, Lee Yoon-ji	Radio DJ Award	
3	Kim Dong-jun, Lee Na-eun	Best Couple Award	
4	Yook Seung-jae, Jeong Young-ju	Best Challenge Award	
5	Hong Jin-young, Haha	Best Family Award	
6	Lee Sang-min, Lee Kwang-soo	Honorary Employee Award	
7	Kim Jin, Kim Jung-hwa	Best Entertainer Award	
8	Kim Hee-chul, Sunwoo Yong-nyeo	Global Programme Award	
9	So Yi-hyun, Choi Sung-kook	Best Teamwork Award	
10	Chungha, Yoon Sang-hyun	SNS Star Award	
11	Yang Se-chan, Yang Se-hyung	Excellence Program Award in Reality Category; Excellence Program Award in Show/Variety Category	
12	Lee Tae-gon, Song Ji-hyo	Top Excellence Programme in Reality Category	
13	Kim Wan-sun, Kangnam	Excellence Award in Reality Category; Excellence Award in Show/Variety Category	
14	Gim Gu-ra, Han Bo-reum	Top Excellence Award in Reality Category; Top Excellence Award in Show/Variety Category	
15	Kim Jong-kook, Kim Sook	Producer's Award	
16	Ju Byeong-jin	Merit Award	
17	Lee Seung-gi, Choi Young-in	Grand Prize (Daesang)	

== Special performances ==
Order	Artist	Song/Spectacle	Ref.
1	ITZY	Intro + Dalla Dalla	
2	Durbo (Kim Joo-woo, Kim Yoon-sang)	My Childhood Dream (Original: Turbo)	
2	S.Y.S (Jang Ye-won, Ju Si-eun, Kim Soo-min)	I'm Your Girl (Original: S.E.S)	
2	Durbo, S.Y.S (Kim Joo-woo, Kim Yoon-sang, Jang Ye-won, Ju Si-eun, Kim Soo-min)	The Angle Who Lost Wings (Original: Roo'ra)	
3	Inner Band (Kim Kwang-kyu, Kim Wan-sun)	Hawaiian Dance	
4	Chungha	Gotta Go	
