= 2022 SBS Entertainment Awards =

16th edition of award ceremony

- Official poster
- Awarded for: Excellence in variety entertainment
- Date: December 17, 2022
- Venue: SBS Prism Tower, Sangam-dong, Mapo-gu, Seoul
- Country: South Korea
- Presented by: Seoul Broadcasting System
- Hosted by: Tak Jae-hoon; Jang Do-yeon; Lee Hyun-yi
- First award: 2007

Highlights
- Grand Prize: Yoo Jae-suk
- Producer Award: Tak Jae-hoon
- Website: SBS Entertainment Awards

Television/radio coverage
- Network: SBS TV
- Viewership: Ratings: 5.5%; Viewers: 1.099 millions

The 2022 SBS Entertainment Awards presented by Seoul Broadcasting System (SBS), took place on December 17, 2022, at SBS Prism Tower in Sangam-dong, Mapo-gu, Seoul. The award ceremony was hosted by Tak Jae-hoon, Jang Do-yeon and Lee Hyun-yi. This year 4 special stages were prepared, that included a surprise celebration stage for the performers who made SBS entertainment shine, special congratulatory stages for NewJeans, who performed a collaboration stage with FC Balladream, the 'Fantastic Family - DNA Singer', consisting of the Seo Mun-tak sisters, and the Yeong-ji family, and also a special collaboration stage between Seo Moon-tak and Youngji.

Yoo Jae-suk won the Grand Prize (Daesang) for the 7th time whereas Tak Jae-hoon, who was also nominated for the grand prize, won the Producer Award.

== Nominations and winners ==
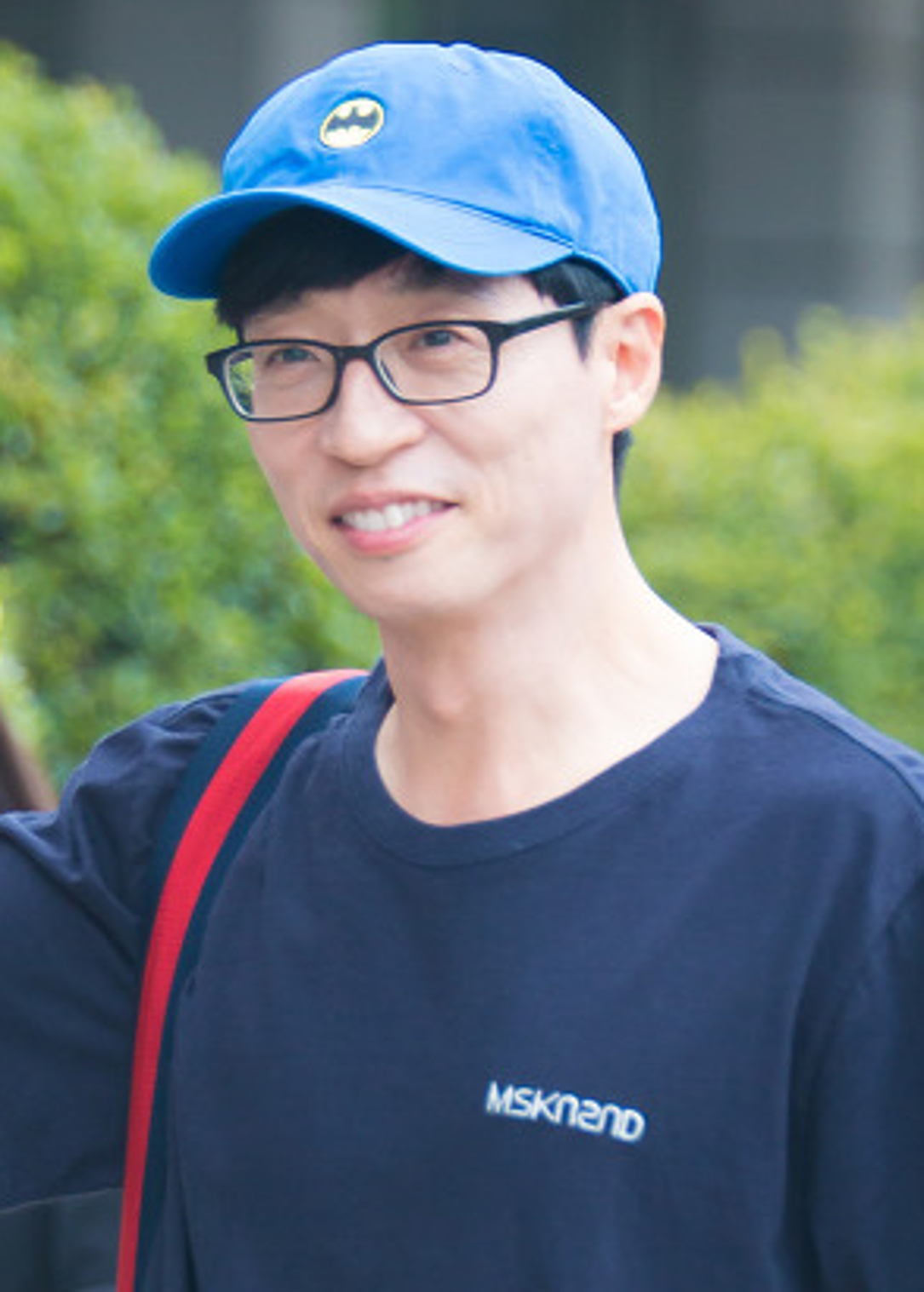
Yoo Jae-suk, winner of Grand Prize (Daesang)

(Winners denoted in bold)

Grand Prize (Daesang)
**Yoo Jae-suk**; Tak Jae-hoon; Lee Sang-min; Shin Dong-yup; Jee Seok-jin; Kim Jong-kook
Producer Award		Honorary Employee Award	
**Tak Jae-hoon - My Little Old Boy, Dolsing Fourmen**		**Lee Sang-min - My Little Old Boy, Dolsing Fourmen**	
Top Excellence in Talk and Reality Award		Top Excellence Award in Show and Sports Category	
**Kim Joon-ho - My Little Old Boy, Dolsing Fourmen**		**Lee Hyun-yi - Kick a Goal**	
Excellence Award in Talk and Reality Category		Excellence Award in Show and Sports Category	
**Heo Kyung-hwan - My Little Old Boy**		**Chae Ri-na - Kick a Goal**	
Lifetime Achievement Award		Rookie Award	
**Lee Sang-min - My Little Old Boy, Dolsing Fourmen**		**Ha Seok-ju and Yoon Tae-jin - Kick a Goal**	
Radio DJ Award		Best Couple Award	
Power FM	Love FM	Best Couple Award	
**Wendy - Wendy's Youngstreet**	**Yoon Soo-hyun - Yoon Soo-hyun's Diverse World**	**Yoo Jae-suk, Kim Jong-kook - Running Man**	
Scriptwriter Award
Liberal Arts Category		Entertainment Category	Radio Category
**Seo In-hee - The Story of the Day When One Bites One's Tail**		**Kang Seung-hee - Dolsing Fourmen**	**Jo Hye-jung - Bae Sung-jae's Ten**
Program of the Year Award
Show and Sports Category	Variety Category	Talk and Reality Category	
**Kick a Goal**	**Running Man**	**My Little Old Boy**	
Leader of the Year Award		Popularity Award	
**Kick a Goal** **Team Leaders** (Note: with Ha Seok-ju, Kim Byung-ji, Kim Tae-young, Choi Jin-cheul, Choi Sung-yong, Lee Eul-yong, Heon Young-min, Lee Young-pyo, Oh Beom-seok, Cho Jae-jin and Baek Ji-hoon)		**Bae Sung-jae - Kick a Goal**; **Kick a Goal S3 Team Leader**	
Best Character Award		Tiki-Taka of the Year Award	
**Lee Kyung-kyu - Golf Battle: Birdie Buddies**		**KyoungSeo and Seogi -** **Kick a Goal**	
Social Star Award		Eco-brity Award	Best Team Work Award
Talk and Reality Category	Show and Sports Category	Eco-brity Award	Best Team Work Award
**Im Chang-jung and Seo Ha-yan – Same Bed, Different Dreams 2: You Are My Destiny**	**Yoo Hyun-ju - Golf Battle: Birdie Buddies**	**Kim Byung-man – The Law of Symbiosis**	**Same Bed, Different Dreams 2 Team**
Scene Stealer Award		2022 SBS's Daughter and Son	
**Jung Hye-in - Kick a Goal**; **Im Won-hee - My Little Old Boy, Dolsing Fourmen**		**Lee Hyun-yi - Kick a Goal, Same Bed, Different Dreams 2: You Are My Destiny, DNA Singers**; **Kim Joon-ho - My Little Old Boy, Dolsing Fourmen**	

== Presenters ==
Order	Presenter	Award	Ref.
1	Yoo Jae-suk and Kim Ji-eun		
2			
3			
4			
5			
6			
7			
8			
9			
10			
11	and Choi Young-in	Grand Prize (Daesang)	

== Performances ==
Order	Artist	Act performed	Ref.
1	NewJeans	"Attention"	
2			
3			
4			

== See also ==
- 2022 KBS Entertainment Awards
- 2022 MBC Entertainment Awards
