= A Bloody Battle for Revenge =

- Theatrical poster
- Directed by: Lee Kyung-kyu
- Written by: Lee Kyung-kyu
- Produced by: Im Sang-don
- Starring: Lee Kyung-kyu
- Release date: October 10, 1992
- Running time: 88 minutes
- Country: South Korea
- Language: Korean

A Bloody Battle for Revenge (Korean: 복수혈전) is a 1992 South Korean action film directed, written by, and starring Lee Kyung-kyu. This film is often cited as an example of failure in the movie industry in South Korea.
