= Park Soo-hong =

South Korean comedian and presenter (born 1970)

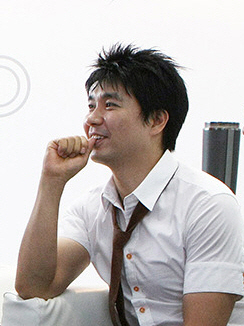
- Park in 2010
- Born: October 27, 1970 (age 55); Seoul, South Korea
- Spouse: Kim Da-ye (m. 2021)
- Children: 1

Comedy career
- Years active: Since 1991–present
- Medium: Stand-up, television
- Genres: Observational, sketch, wit, parody, slapstick, dramatic, sitcom

Korean name
- Hangul: 박수홍
- Hanja: 朴修弘
- RR: Bak Suhong
- MR: Pak Suhong

Park Soo-hong (Korean: 박수홍, born October 27, 1970), is a South Korean comedian and presenter.

== Career ==
In 1991, Park won bronze in the National College Comedy Contest, making his official debut in the South Korean entertainment industry.

In the early 1990s, Park was a part of a group of comedians who called themselves Team Potato (Korean: 감자골), composed of Kim Gook-jin, Kim Soo-yong and Kim Yong-man, who all debuted the same year on Korean channel KBS.

It was reported that Kim Yong-man had been admitted to hospital due to the comedians' busy schedule, and so Kim Gook-jin tried to convince their producers to lighten their load. However, producers didn't take this well, and ultimately banned Team Potato from appearing on television.

As a result, in January 1993, the four comedians decided to leave South Korea for the United States of America, taking a break from the South Korean entertainment industry, although ultimately, only Kim Yong-man and Kim Gook-jin went to the United States of America, while Park began his compulsory army duty and Kim Soo-yong went to Canada.

In 2004, Park hosted the 2004 MBC Entertainment Awards, along with Kim Won-hee. In 2005, he hosted the 41st Baeksang Arts Awards, with announcer Lee Hye-seung. In 2017, Park hosted the 2017 KBS Drama Awards, along with Lee Yoo-ri and Namkoong Min. In 2018, he hosted the 2018 Miss Korea pageant, alongside Yura (Girl's Day).

== Personal life ==
Park is a darts fan, having attended and participated in the Phoenix Summer Festival's dartscompetition, held and sponsored by the Korea Darts Association.

Ahead of the 2018 South Korean local elections and the South Korean by-elections, Park took part in the 613 Vote and Laugh (613 투표하고 웃자) campaign, along with comedians Kang Ho-dong and Shin Dong-yup, encouraging the Korean public to exercise their right to vote.

On July 28, 2021, Park wrote on his personal Instagram account that he had married his girlfriend (who isn't a celebrity). On November 24, 2022, it was confirmed that the official wedding will take place on December 23, 2022. On March 18, 2024, Park announced that his wife was pregnant with the couple's first child. The couple welcomed their first child, a daughter, on October 13, 2024.

In early September 2022, Park Soo Hong's older brother was arrested on charges of embezzling an estimated 10 billion KRW (approximately $7.1 million USD) from Park Soo Hong. On October 4, 2022 while he was being cross-examined by the prosecution in a related case, his father attacked him both verbally and with several kicks. He was transported to the emergency room of a nearby hospital after fainting due to severe stress and shock.

In October 2023, Park Soo-hong sued his brother-in-law for sending a message containing false facts such as that he lived with a woman during his broadcasting activities. In December 2024, the court issued a fine of 12 million won, saying, "The accused is guilty of spreading false information for slanderous purposes." Both the prosecution and Lee appealed against the ruling. In July 2026, the appeals of both the defendant and the prosecution were dismissed at the appeal trial, and a fine of 12 million won was the same as that of the first trial.

== Filmography ==
=== Variety shows ===
| Year | Show | Role | Notes |
|---|---|---|---|
| 2012–present | Dongchimi | Host | |
| 2016–2021 | My Little Old Boy | Cast member | Episodes 1–237 |
| 2017 | Is Separation a Big Deal? | Host | Season 1– |
| 2017 | All Broadcasting in the World | Cast member | Episodes 1–9 |
| 2017–2018 | Happy Together - Legendary Big Mouth | Cast member | Episodes 502–554 |
| 2017–present | Rumor Has It | Host | Episode 101– |
| 2021 | Pet Vitamin | Host | |
| 2022 | Children's Taste, Dongchimi | Host | Chuseok special |
| 2022–2023 | Lovers of Joseon | Host | with Park Kyung-lim, Choi Seong-guk and Oh Na-mi |

== Awards and nominations ==
| Year | Award | Category | Nominated work | Result | Ref. |
|---|---|---|---|---|---|
| 2002 | MBC Drama Awards | Best TV Host/Special Award for TV MC | Time Machine | Won | |
| 2003 | MBC Entertainment Awards | Excellence Award | | Won | |
| 2004 | MBC Entertainment Awards | PD's Award – Variety | | Won | |
| 2005 | Baeksang Arts Awards | Best Variety Performer – Male | Sunday Sunday Night | Nominated | |
| 2016 | MBC Entertainment Awards | Best Newcomer Award - Radio | Choi Yoo-ra, Park Soo-hong's Now the Radio Generation | Won | |
| 2016 | SBS Entertainment Awards | PD Award | My Little Old Boy | Won | |
| 2016 | SBS Entertainment Awards | Top Excellence Award in Talk Show | My Little Old Boy | Nominated | |
| 2017 | Baeksang Arts Awards | Best Variety Performer – Male | My Little Old Boy | Nominated | |
| 2017 | SBS Entertainment Awards | Best Couple Award (with Yoon Jung-soo) | My Little Old Boy | Nominated | |

== See also ==
- List of comedians
