= Jo Hye-ryun =

South Korean comedian (born 1970)

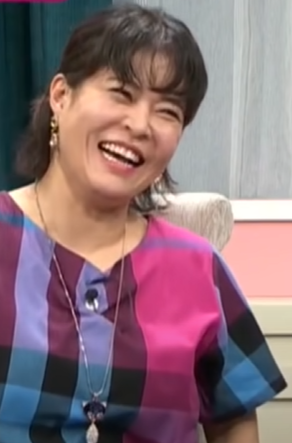
- Born: May 29, 1970 (age 56); Goseong County, South Gyeongsang, South Korea

Comedy career
- Years active: 1992–present
- Medium: Stand-up, television
- Genres: Observational, Sketch, Wit, Parody, Slapstick, Dramatic, Sitcom, Tae Bo

Jo Hye-ryun (Korean: 조혜련; Hanja: 趙惠蓮; born May 29, 1970) is a South Korean comedian. She is a former cast member in the variety show Law of the Jungle W.

In 1992, through 《KBS University Gag Festival》, she debuted with the Rookie of the Year Award at the Comedy Awards. She is the first Korean comedian to enter Japan, and she is currently only active in Korea. Her agency is JoyCultures. Her stage name in Japan is "Heryon (ヘリョン)". Her main building is Ham-an, and she was born in Goseong County, South Gyeongsang Province, and grew up in Anyang, Gyeonggi. Her current residence is Songdo-dong, Yeonsu District, Incheon.

== Filmography ==
=== Television shows ===
Year	Title	Role	Notes	Ref.
2022	Curling Queens	Cast	Holiday specials	
2022	Taste of Travel	Cast		

== Awards and nominations ==
- Won Best TV Star Award at the 2010 SBS Entertainment Awards
