= Kim Seung-soo =

South Korean actor (born 1971)

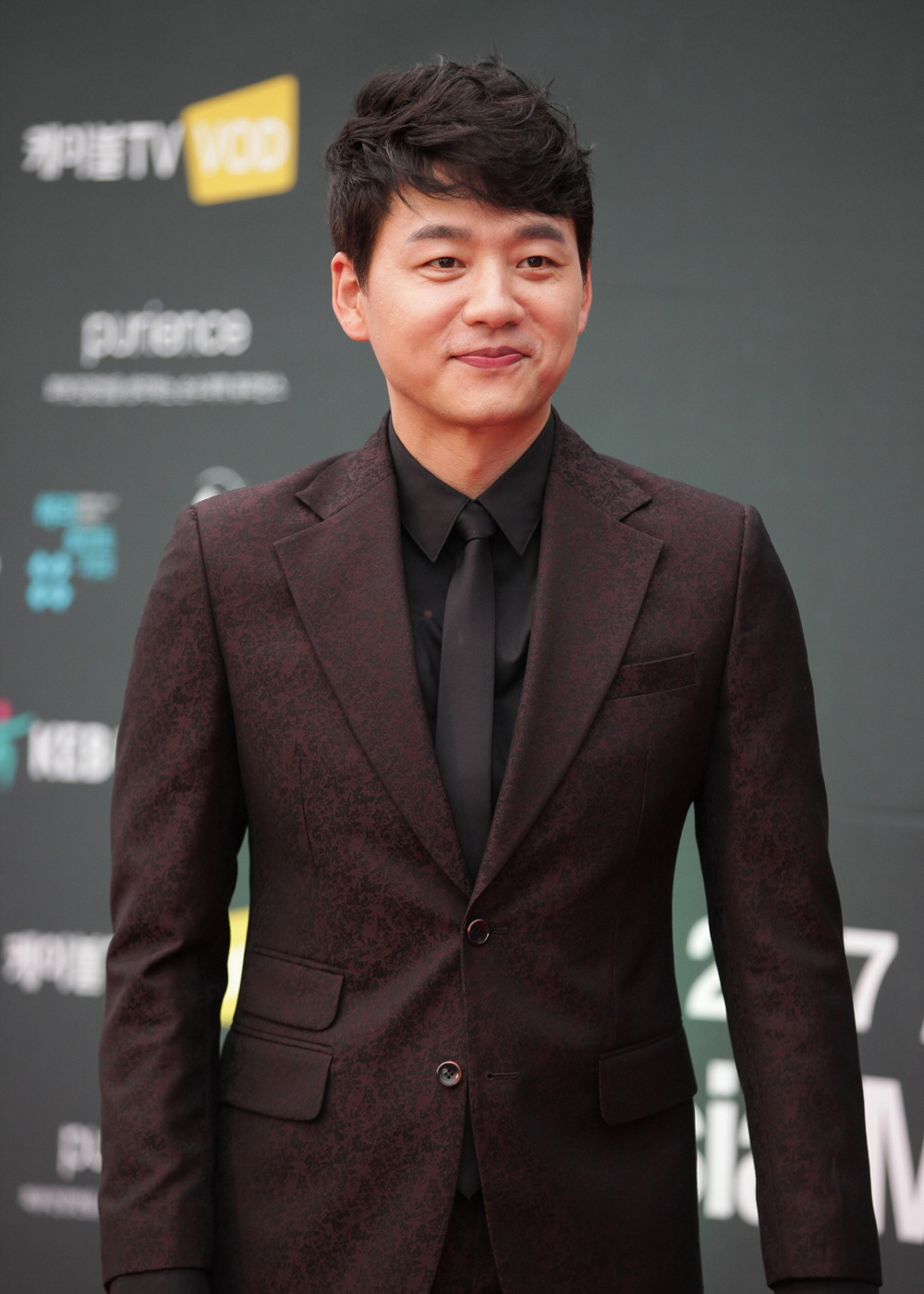
- Kim in 2017
- Born: July 25, 1971 (age 55); Seoul, South Korea
- Education: Kyonggi University - Bachelor of Physical Education
- Occupation: Actor
- Years active: 1997–present
- Agent: Popeye Entertainment

Korean name
- Hangul: 김승수
- Hanja: 金承洙
- RR: Gim Seungsu
- MR: Kim Sŭngsu
- Website: kimseungsoo.com

Kim Seung-soo (Korean: 김승수; born July 25, 1971) is a South Korean actor.

== Career ==
Kim became known for playing attractive middle-aged men in television and was given the nickname "Middle-Aged Park Bo-gum" by media outlets.

== Filmography ==
=== Film ===
Year	Title	Role	Ref.
1995	A Single Spark		
2000	General Hospital the Movie: A Thousand Days		
2000	My Heart		
2023	In Dream	Sang Joon	
TBA	Gochibang		

=== Television series ===
- Hur Jun (1999)
- Bad Boys (2000)
- Rookie (2000)
- Cool (2001)
- Mina (2001)
- Fox and Cotton Candy (2001)
- Remember (2002)
- Golden Pond (2002)
- Wife (2003)
- Sweetheart (2003)
- One Million Roses (2003)
- You are a Star (2004)
- My Sweetheart My Darling (2005)
- Jumong (2006)
- Kimcheed Radish Cubes (2007)
- Why Did You Come to My House (2008)
- Don't Ask Me About the Past (2008)
- Glass Castle (2008)
- Good Job, Good Job (2009)
- I Am Legend (2010)
- Gwanggaeto, The Great Conqueror (2011)
- Just Like Today (2012)
- Still You (2012)
- Cheongdam-dong Alice (2012)
- Who Are You? (2013) (guest appearance, ep 3–4, 13)
- A Little Love Never Hurts (2013)
- Family Secret (2014)
- The Merchant: Gaekju 2015 (2015) (guest appearance)
- Love in the Moonlight (2016)
- First Love Again (2017)
- Are You Human? (2018) (cameo)
- Sweet Munchies (2020)
- Kingmaker: The Change of Destiny (2020)
- Royal Secret Agent (2020) (guest appearance, ep 1, 3)
- Love Scene Number (2021)
- River Where the Moon Rises (2021) (cameo)
- Show Window: The Queen's House (2021)
- Three Bold Siblings (2022) - Shin Moo-yeong
- Under the Queen's Umbrella (2022) - Park Kyung-woo
- Delivery Man (2023) - Ji Chang-seok

=== Television shows ===
Year	Title	Role	Ref.
2017	King of Mask Singer	Contestant (Cheolsu) Episode 121	
2021	Cooking - The Birth of a Cooking King	Contestant	
2022	Gyeonggi Province, Where Have You Been	Host	

== Awards and nominations ==
Name of the award ceremony, year presented, category, nominee of the award, and the result of the nomination
Award ceremony	Year	Category	Nominee / Work	Result	Ref.
KBS Drama Awards	2003	Excellence Award, Actor	One Million Roses	Won	
KBS Drama Awards	2017	Excellence Award, Actor in a Daily Drama	First Love Again	Won	
KBS Drama Awards	2022	Excellence Award, Actor in a Serial Drama	Three Bold Siblings	Nominated	
KBS Drama Awards	2022	Best Couple Award	Kim Seung-soo (with Kim So-eun); Three Bold Siblings	Won	
MBC Drama Awards	2002	Best New Actor	Fox and Cotton Candy, Remember	Nominated	
MBC Drama Awards	2006	Excellence Award, Actor	Jumong	Won	
SBS Entertainment Awards	2024	Top Excellence Award, Male	My Little Old Boy	Won	
