= 2021 SBS Entertainment Awards =

15th edition of award ceremony

- Official poster
- Awarded for: Excellence in variety entertainment
- Date: December 18, 2021
- Venue: SBS Prism Tower, Sangam-dong, Mapo-gu, Seoul
- Country: South Korea
- Presented by: Seoul Broadcasting System
- Hosted by: Lee Seung-gi; Jang Do-yeon; Han Hye-jin
- Campaign: 'Next Level' with SBS entertainers who shined in 2021
- First award: 2007

Highlights
- Grand Prize: Team of My Little Old Boy
- Producer Award: Lee Seung-gi - Master in the House, Loud
- Honorary Employee Award: Jee Seok-jin - Running Man
- Website: SBS Entertainment Awards

Television/radio coverage
- Network: SBS TV
- Runtime: Approx. 265 minutes
- Viewership: 5.6%
- Produced by: Kim Jun-su; Jo Yong-jae

The 2021 SBS Entertainment Awards presented by Seoul Broadcasting System (SBS), took place on December 18, 2021, at SBS Prism Tower in Sangam-dong, Mapo-gu, Seoul. This year's show had metaverse in addition to sets and stages. The award ceremony was hosted by Lee Seung-gi, Jang Do-yeon and Han Hye-jin, and the Grand Prize (Daesang) was won by the team of My Little Old Boy.

== Nominations and winners ==
(Winners denoted in bold)

Grand Prize (Daesang)
**My Little Old Boy team (Shin Dong-yup, Seo Jang-hoon, Cho Hye-seon, Kim Sun-ja, Park Young-hye, Lee Sang-min, Tak Jae-hoon, Im Won-hee, Kim Joon-ho, Kim Jong-kook, Kim Hee-chul, Lee Tae-sung, Oh Min-suk, Park Goon, Choi Jin-hyuk)**
Producer Award		Honorary Employee Award	
**Lee Seung-gi - Master in the House, Loud, Team Up 072**		**Jee Seok-jin - Running Man**	
Top Excellence in Reality Award		Top Excellence Award in Variety Category	
**Tak Jae-hoon - My Little Old Boy, Dolsing Fourmen, Tiki-taCAR**		**Yang Se-chan - Running Man**	
Top Excellence Award in Show and Sports Category		Top Excellence Award in Variety Program Category	
**Park Sun-yeong - Shooting Stars**		**Running Man**	
Top Excellence Award in Show and Sports Program Category		Excellence Award in Talk/ Variety Category	
**Shooting Stars**		**Kim Joon-ho - My Little Old Boy, Dolsing Fourmen**; **Im Won-hee - My Little Old Boy, Dolsing Fourmen**	
Excellence Award in Reality Category		Excellence Award in Show and Sports Program Category	
**Lee Ji-hye - Same Bed, Different Dreams 2: You Are My Destiny**		**Shooting Stars S1 cast**	
Excellence Award in Talk/Variety Program Category		Excellence Program Award in Show and Sports Program Category	
**Dolsing Fourmen**		**Archive K**; **Loud**	
Rookie Award			Coach Award
Show and Sports	Variety	Reality	Coach Award
**Lee Seung-yuop** **- Golf Battle: Birdie Buddies**	**Keum Sae-rok – Baek Jong-won's Alley Restaurant**	**Park Goon – My Little Old Boy, Law of Jungle**; **Lee Hyun-yi – Same Bed, Different Dreams 2: You Are My Destiny, Shooting Stars**	**Shooting Stars S1 Coaches - Shooting Stars**
Best Family Award		Special Award	
**Same Bed, Different Dreams 2: You Are My Destiny** **team**		**Baek Jong-won's Alley Restaurant**	
Next Level Award		Best Teamwork Award	
**Jang Do-yeon - The Story of the Day When One Bites One's Tail, I Need Warmance**		**Master in the House team**	
Best Couple Award		Scriptwriter Award	
**Lee Soo-geun and Bae Seung-jae - Shooting Stars**; Kim Joon-ho and Lee Sang-min - My Little Old Boy; Lee Kyung-gyu and Lee Hyun-joo - Golf Battle: Birdie Buddies; Lee Ji-hye and Moon Jae-wan - Same Bed, Different Dreams 2: You Are My Destiny; Kim Jong-kook and Song Ji-hyo - Running Man		**Hwang Chae-young - Unanswered Questions**; **Yang Hyo-im - Running Man**; **Jang Jung-hee - Shooting Stars**; **Kim Yoon-hee - Kim Young-chul's Power FM**	
Radio DJ Award		Rookie Radio DJ Award	
Power FM	Love FM	Rookie Radio DJ Award	
**Boom - Boom Boom Power**	**Lee Sook-young - Lee Sook-young Love FM**	**Park Ha-sun - Park Ha-sun's Cine Town**	
Entertainer of the Year Award
**Shin Dong-yup - My Little Old Boy, Animal Farm, I Need Warmance**; **Tak Jae-hoon - My Little Old Boy, Dolsing Fourmen**; **Lee Sang-min - My Little Old Boy, Dolsing Fourmen**; **Lee Kyung-gyu - Golf Battle: Birdie Buddies**; **Lee Seung-gi - Master in the House, Golf Battle: Birdie Buddies, Loud**; **Park Sun-yeong - Shooting Stars**; **Yoo Jae-suk - Running Man**; **Jee Seok-jin - Running Man**; **Kim Jong-kook - Running Man, My Little Old Boy**; **Kim Gu-ra - Same Bed, Different Dreams 2: You Are My Destiny**; **Seo Jang-hoon - My Little Old Boy, Same Bed, Different Dreams 2: You Are My Destiny**; **Yang Se-hyung - Master in the House**

== Presenters ==
Order	Presenter	Award	Ref.
1	Jee Seok-jin and Cha Eun-woo	Rookie Awards	
2	Kim Tae-gyun and Park So-hyun	Radio DJ Award	
3	An San and Yang Se-hyung	Next Level Award	
4	Kim Byung-ji and Choi Yeo-jin	Best Family Award	
5	Yang Se-chan and Jeon So-min	Best Team Work Award	
5	Yang Se-chan and Jeon So-min	Best Couple Award	
6	Bae Jung-nam and Keum Sae-rok	Special Award	
7	Lee Ji-hoon and Kim Hee-chul	Excellence Programme Award	
8	Kim Gu-ra and Song Ji-hyo	Top Excellence Program Award	
9	Lee Kyung-gyu and Yoo Hyun-joo	Top Excellence Award	
10	Shin Dong-yup	Producer Award	
10	Shin Dong-yup	Honorary Employee Award	
11	Kim Jong-kook and Choi Young-in	Grand Prize (Daesang)	

== Performances ==
Order	Artist	Act performed	Ref.
1	Aespa	Next Level	
2	Shin Hyo-bum and Jee Seok-jin	I Knew I Love	
3	FC Old Tall from Shooting Stars	Montero and Hey Mama	
4	Song So-hee and Hwang So-yoon	3! 4! (Originally by Roo'ra)	

== See also ==
- 2021 KBS Entertainment Awards
- 2021 MBC Entertainment Awards
