= Lee Kyung-kyu =

South Korean actor and comedian

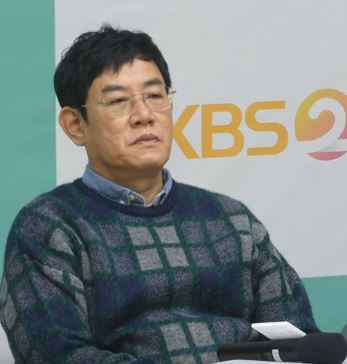
- Lee in October 2019
- Born: September 21, 1960 (age 66); Busan, South Korea
- Notable work: Qualifications of Men
- Spouse: Kang Kyung-hee
- Children: 1

Comedy career
- Years active: 1981–present
- Medium: Television
- Genre: Comedy

Korean name
- Hangul: 이경규
- RR: I Gyeonggyu
- MR: I Kyŏnggyu

Lee Kyung-kyu (born September 21, 1960) is a South Korean actor, comedian, MC, film producer, and screenwriter. He was the highest paid entertainer on the KBS network in 2010, with earnings of ₩535 million.

Lee patented his instant noodle recipe Kkokkomyeon (Korean: 꼬꼬면), which he created during an amateur cooking contest in an episode of the variety show Qualifications of Men. It became one of the top-selling products of 2011, and changed the landscape of the domestic instant noodles' market.

== Filmography ==
=== Film ===
- Born to Sing (2013) - producer, screenwriter, cameo
- White Tuft, the Little Beaver (2008) - Korean dubbing
- Highway Star (2007) - producer, cameo
- Aachi & Ssipak (animated, 2006) - voice cast
- A Bloody Battle for Revenge (1992) - director, screenwriter, lead actor
- Space Warrior, Fireman (1991) - lead actor
- Samtos and Dori with Braids (1989) - cast
- Super Hong Gil-dong (1988) - cast

=== Variety show ===
Year	Title
1984-1992	청춘행진곡
1991-1992; 2005-2007	Hidden Camera
1999-2005	전파견문록
2000-2002	뉴 논스톱
2004	이경규의 굿타임
2005	유쾌한 두뇌검색
2005-2006	코미디 버라이어티 웃는 day
2009-2013	Qualifications of Men
2009–2015	Star Junior Show
2011–2015	Healing Camp, Aren't You Happy
2012–2014	Family's Dignity: Full House
2014	Korea's Hottest Square
2015	Take Care of My Dad
2015–2016	A Look At Myself
2016–2017	My Little Television
2016–2020	Let's Eat Dinner Together
2017	The Dynamic Duo (공조7)
2017–present	The Fishermen and the City (Season 1–4)
2019	Six-Party Talks
2019–2022	Stars' Top Recipe at Fun-Staurant
2020–present	ZZIN Kyung Kyu
2021–present	Golf Battle: Birdie Buddies (Season 1 – 5)
2021–present	Family Register Mate
2022	Things Are Suspicious these Days
2022	IT Live from Today
2022	The First Business in the World
2022	RE Kyung-kyu is going
2023	City Sashimi Restaurant

== Accolades ==
=== Awards and nominations ===
Name of the award ceremony, year presented, category, nominee of the award, and the result of the nomination
Award ceremony	Year	Category	Nominee / Work	Result	Ref.
KBS Entertainment Awards	2022	Entertainer of the Year	Dogs Are Incredible	Won	
MBC Entertainment Awards	2022	Achievement Award		Won	
SBS Entertainment Awards	2010	SBS 20th Anniversary Entertainment Top 10 Star Award		Won	
SBS Entertainment Awards	2012	Top Excellence Award (Talk show)	Healing Camp	Won	
SBS Entertainment Awards	2021	Entertainer of the Year Award	Golf Battle: Birdie Buddies	Won	
SBS Entertainment Awards	2022	Best Character Award	Golf Battle: Birdie Buddies	Won	

=== Listicles ===
Name of publisher, year listed, name of listicle, and placement
Publisher	Year	Listicle	Placement	Ref.
Forbes	2010	Korea Power Celebrity 40	36th	
Forbes	2011	Korea Power Celebrity 40	27th	
Forbes	2012	Korea Power Celebrity 40	35th	
