= Baek Ji-hoon =

South Korean footballer (born 1985)

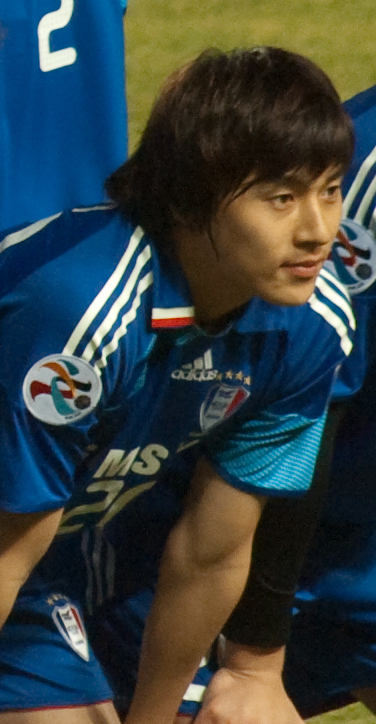

Personal information
- Date of birth: 28 February 1985 (age 41)
- Place of birth: Sacheon, South Gyeongsang, South Korea
- Height: 1.75 m (5 ft 9 in)
- Position: Midfielder

Youth career
- 2000–2002: Andong High School

Senior career*
| Years | Team | Apps | (Gls) |
| 2003–2004 | Chunnam Dragons | 11 | (0) |
| 2005–2006 | FC Seoul | 27 | (1) |
| 2006–2016 | Suwon Samsung Bluewings | 114 | (15) |
| 2012–2013 | → Sangju Sangmu (army) | 25 | (1) |
| 2014 | → Ulsan Hyundai (loan) | 19 | (2) |
| 2017 | Seoul E-Land | 15 | (1) |
| 2018–2019 | Lee Man | 14 | (1) |

International career
| 2003–2005 | South Korea U20 | 31 | (6) |
| 2006–2008 | South Korea U23 | 19 | (1) |
| 2005–2010 | South Korea | 15 | (0) |
- * Club domestic league appearances and goals as of 19 July 2019

- Korean name
- Hangul: 백지훈
- Hanja: 白智勳
- RR: Baek Jihun
- MR: Paek Chihun

Baek Ji-hoon (born 28 February 1985) is a South Korean former footballer who played as a midfielder.

== Career ==
=== Debut in the K League ===
After leaving high school, Baek joined the K League side Jeonnam Dragons. He made four appearances in his first season before he was moved into the reserve team. In 2004, Baek played seven games in the first team and his progress was noted by South Korea U20 coach Park Sung-hwa who installed him as a captain.

The following year Baek took another step forward when he joined FC Seoul. He appeared 15 times in the K League in the 2005 season, scoring one goal. In July 2006, FC Seoul negotiated with Suwon Samsung Bluewings to transfer Baek to Suwon. Later in the same month, his transfer was confirmed. The reported transfer fee was about $1.5 million.

=== Lee Man ===
Out of contract for six months, Baek decided to go abroad for the first time in his career. On 6 June 2018, he reached an agreement with Hong Kong Premier League side Lee Man. He scored his debut goal for the club on 27 October 2018 against Eastern in the Hong Kong Senior Challenge Shield in a 2–1 defeat.

== Club career statistics ==
As of 19 December 2012

| Club performance | | | League | | Cup | | League Cup | | Continental | | Total | |
| Season | Club | League | Apps | Goals | Apps | Goals | Apps | Goals | Apps | Goals | Apps | Goals |
| South Korea | | | League | | KFA Cup | | League Cup | | Asia | | Total | |
|---|---|---|---|---|---|---|---|---|---|---|---|---|
| 2003 | Chunnam Dragons | K League | 4 | 0 | 1 | 0 | — | | — | | 5 | 0 |
| 2004 | Chunnam Dragons | K League | 7 | 0 | 3 | 0 | 11 | 1 | — | | 21 | 1 |
| 2005 | FC Seoul | K League | 15 | 1 | 1 | 0 | 7 | 1 | — | | 23 | 2 |
| 2006 | FC Seoul | K League | 12 | 0 | 0 | 0 | 3 | 1 | — | | 15 | 1 |
| 2006 | Suwon Samsung Bluewings | K League | 14 | 5 | 2 | 1 | 0 | 0 | — | | 16 | 6 |
| 2007 | Suwon Samsung Bluewings | K League | 16 | 3 | 2 | 0 | 7 | 3 | — | | 25 | 6 |
| 2008 | Suwon Samsung Bluewings | K League | 14 | 4 | 2 | 0 | 5 | 0 | — | | 21 | 4 |
| 2009 | Suwon Samsung Bluewings | K League | 22 | 1 | 3 | 1 | 1 | 0 | 5 | 0 | 41 | 2 |
| 2010 | Suwon Samsung Bluewings | K League | 9 | 2 | 2 | 2 | 6 | 0 | 6 | 0 | 29 | 4 |
| 2011 | Suwon Samsung Bluewings | K League | 0 | 0 | 0 | 0 | 0 | 0 | 0 | 0 | 0 | 0 |
| 2012 | Sangju Sangmu Phoenix | K League | 14 | 0 | | | | | — | | 14 | 0 |
| Total | South Korea | | 127 | 16 | 16 | 4 | 40 | 6 | 11 | 0 | 193 | 26 |
| Career total | | | 127 | 16 | 16 | 4 | 40 | 6 | 11 | 0 | 193 | 26 |

== Honours ==
=== Club ===
Lee Man

- Hong Kong Sapling Cup: 2018–19

=== Entertainment ===
Name of the award ceremony, year presented, category, nominee of the award, and the result of the nomination
| Award ceremony | Year | Category | Nominee / Work | Result | Ref. |
|---|---|---|---|---|---|
| SBS Entertainment Awards | 2022 | Leader of the Year Award (Note: with Ha Seok-ju, Kim Byung-ji, Kim Tae-young, Choi Jin-cheul, Choi Sung-yong, Lee Eul-yong, Heon Young-min, Lee Young-pyo, Oh Beom-seok, Cho Jae-jin and Baek Ji-hoon) | Kick a Goal | Won | |

== Filmography ==
=== Television shows ===
| Year | Title | Role | Notes | Ref. |
|---|---|---|---|---|
| 2021 | Playing Bro | Cast Member | Season 2 | |
| 2021–present | Goal Girl | Team manager | Season 2–3 | |
| 2023 | World's First Merchant | Contestant | Season 2 | |
