= Kick a Goal =

South Korean sports variety show

- Promotional poster
- Hangul: 골 때리는 그녀들
- RR: Gol ttaerineun geunyeodeul
- MR: Kol ttaerinŭn kŭnyŏdŭl
- Genre: Variety show Sports
- Starring: Lee Soo-geun, Bae Sung-jae
- Country of origin: South Korea
- Original language: Korean

Production
- Producer: Park Sung-hoon
- Running time: around 100 minutes
- Production company: Prism Studios

Original release
- Network: SBS TV
- Release: 16 June 2021 – present

Kick a Goal (Korean: 골 때리는 그녀들; also known as Shooting Stars) is a South Korean sports variety show about women's football that aired on SBS TV. It was first aired on 11 February 2021. Following positive reception, it started broadcasting regularly on 16 July 2021.

On the show, female artists and television personalities compete in a five-a-side football tournament. Lee Soo-geun and Bae Sung-jae act as commentators for the series.

== Format ==
The show mainly uses the rules of futsal. There are two periods of 10 minutes with time stopping at every dead ball. Games cannot end in draws and no additional time is played. The game goes to a penalty shoot-out if the scores are even at full-time.

In Season 1, six teams were divided into two groups which advanced and played single-elimination for the winner.

Season 2 was separated into League and Super League. Last season's top three teams were auto-qualified for Super League. The remaining three teams played in a single round robin league with three other new teams. The top three players of this league advanced to the Super League to compete to be the season's winner.

Season 3 and 4 introduced the Challenger League. The bottom team of the Challenger League lost its qualification for the next season.

Both the Challenger and Super leagues ran at the same time.

All Star games were played between each season.

Season 6 introduced the G League. Ten teams are divided into two groups of five. The top three of each group qualify for the final tournament. The bottom two of each group play in the Challenger League, with the bottom team losing its qualification for the next season.

== Awards and nominations ==
58th Baeksang Arts Awards

- Nominated for Best Entertainment Program

2021 SBS Entertainment Awards

- Best Couple Award: Lee Soo-geun and Bae Seung-jae
- Rookie Award (Reality): Lee Hyun-yi
- Top Excellence Award (Show/Sports): Park Sun-young
- Entertainer of the Year: Park Sun-young
- Excellence Award (Show/Sports): Season 1 cast
- Coach Award: Season 1 coaches
- Scriptwriter of the Year: Jang Jung-hee
- Top Excellence in Programming Award (Show/Sports Category)

2022 SBS Entertainment Awards

- Tiki-Taka of the Year Award: Kyoungseo and Seogi
- SBS's Daughter and Son: Lee Hyun-yi
- Scene Stealer Award: Jung Hye-in
- Rookie Award: Ha Seok-ju and Yoon Tae-jin
- Popularity Award: Bae Sung-jae, Season 3 team leaders
- Excellence Award (Show/Sports): Chae Ri-na
- Top Excellence Award (Show/Sports): Chae Ri-na
- Top Excellence Award (Show and Sports): Lee Hyun-yi
- Excellence in Programming Award (Show/Sports)

== Related Programs ==
- Shooting Night Out (2022) (Sleepover Club Sleep Out) (SBS)
- Lunar New Year Special Kick A Goal – Goalympic (2023) (SBS)
- Kick A Goal: Legend Match, South Korea – Japan (2025)
