= Bae Sung-jae =

South Korean sportscaster (born 1978)

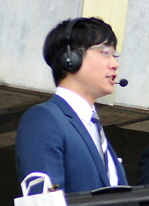
- Born: May 15, 1978 (age 47); Seoul, South Korea
- Occupation(s): Television personality, announcer
- Years active: 2005-present
- Spouse: Kim Da-young (m. 2025)
- Relatives: Bae Seong-woo (brother)

Korean name
- Hangul: 배성재
- RR: Bae Seongjae
- MR: Pae Sŏngjae
- Website: Bae Sung-jae on Twitter

Bae Sung-jae (Korean: 배성재; born 15 May 1978) is a South Korean television personality, sportscaster, radio DJ and announcer.

== Personal life ==
While working at KBS Gwangju Broadcasting Center, he moved to 14 SBS jobs in 2006 to become a sports caster after about 1 year and 6 months after joining. After passing SBS, MBC also received a call to come for the 3rd interview, but it is said that he declined.

SBS, which won the exclusive broadcasting rights for the 2010 World Cup in South Africa, chose Bae Sung-jae as the main caster, breaking through the 4:1 in-house competition rate according to SBS's policy to foster young announcers. He becomes known as a broadcaster with a lot of soccer knowledge while being witty with commentator Cha Bum-geun.

He became known as a soccer caster, and has been an anchor for sports news on SBS 8 News since November 2012.

On November 9, 2015, starting at 10 pm on the weekend, he succeeded K.Will as the DJ of Power FM Bae Sung-jae's weekend United's, which is broadcast for an hour.

In April 2016, through a radio reorganization, Bae Sung-jae's Weekend United was expanded to Bae Sung-jae's Ten, and he is in charge of DJing for an hour starting at 10 pm every night.

On February 16, 2021, an article appeared stating that he submitted his resignation to SBS.

Since March 1, 2021, just after leaving SBS, he has been active as a caster of the K-League 1 broadcaster of the Korea Professional Football Federation.

On February 7, 2025, Bae announced his upcoming marriage in May to SBS announcer Kim Da-young.

== Filmography ==
=== Television shows ===
Year	Title	Role	Notes	Ref.
2021–present	The Girls Who Hit Goals	Narrator	with Lee Soo-geun; season 1–2	
2021	First General Manager	Host		
2021	Hello Trot	Host		
2021	Earth in	Host		
2022	National University is National University	Host	with Jun Hyun-moo	
2022	Local Dining Table	Host		
2022	Shocking Chart	Host		
2022	The First Business in the World	Host		
2022	Crazy Tongue	Host		

=== Web shows ===
Year	Title	Role	Notes	Ref.
2021	Tokka	Host	YouTube Studio (OH! STUDIO)	
2021	Fighting in the House	Host	YouTube Studio Waffle	

=== Hosting ===
Year	Title	Notes	Ref.
2021	opening ceremony 23rd Bucheon International Animation Festival	with Jun Hyo-seong	
2022	Opening Ceremony of the 24th Bucheon International Animation Festival		

== Awards and nominations ==
Year	Award	Category	Nomination	Result	Ref
2015	SBS Entertainment Awards	Announcer Award		Won	
2021	SBS Entertainment Awards	Best Couple Award with Lee Soo-geun	Kick A Goal	Won	
2022	2022 SBS Entertainment Awards	Popularity Award	Kick a Goal	Won	
