= Salty Tour =

South Korean travel television program

- Promotional poster
- Also known as: Thrifter's Guide to Luxurious Travels; Thrifters on Tour (Season 1); New Thrifter's Guide to Luxurious Travels; Thrifters on Tour 2 (Season 2)
- Genre: Travel Documentary; Reality Television; Variety Show
- Starring: See below
- Country of origin: South Korea
- Original language: Korean
- No. of seasons: 2
- No. of episodes: 121 + 1 special (Note: Season 1: 78 Season 2: 43)

Production
- Production location: South Korea
- Running time: 80 minutes

Original release
- Network: tvN
- Release: January 25, 2017 – August 4, 2020

Salty Tour (Korean: 짠내투어) is a South Korean television program that airs on tvN.

Season 1 aired on every Saturday at 22:30 (KST) beginning November 25, 2017 to June 1, 2019.

Season 2, named More Salty Tour (더 짠내투어), began on June 17, 2019 and broadcast timing changed to Mondays at 23:00 (KST).

The show had a hiatus after the episode on March 16, 2020 due to the COVID-19 pandemic, which made travelling and filming for the show difficult. On June 1, it was confirmed that filming for the show had resumed. The program continued from June 30 and broadcast timing changed to Tuesdays at 19:40 (KST). The last episode was aired on August 4.

== Program ==
=== Season 1 ===
For every destination, 2 or 3 of the cast members (or invited guest(s)) are assigned as 1-day tour guides and are given the same budget per person. There are also scenarios where cast members and/or guests work together as the day's tour guides. With a fixed budget, the tour guide(s) for each day have to attempt to provide a best vacation experience. The judging of the 1-day tours will be done by the remaining cast members and invited guests, based on the food, places of interest, accommodation and a temporary criteria (which changes for every destination) for each day. The winning tour guide can get to enjoy a Small Luxury that each of the tour guide wants to enjoy after being the winning tour guide of the destination.

=== Season 2 (More Salty Tour) ===
This season sticks to the same format and rules of Season 1, which emphasised on 1-day tours under tight budgets. However, a new rule is added in this season. For every destination, whoever are assigned as 1-day tour guides can each choose a luxury spot (defined as one that is not the least expensive, but gives more satisfaction), either for food, place of interest or accommodation. The cast members and invited guest(s) have to complete a mission from the production team to get to go for the luxury spot, if not they will have to go for the cheapest alternative of it, arranged by the production team. The winning tour guide(s) for every destination will get a golden badge.

A new format was introduced starting from the 9th tour. 2 (or 2 teams of) tour guides will battle against each other, and the remaining cast members and invited guest(s) will each choose to follow 1, hence 2 different tours in the same destination are held on the same day. In the middle of the day, all are gathered for an evaluation, where the remaining cast members and guest(s) can either continue to follow the same tour guide each of them chose at first or change to be guided under the other tour guide if he/she is not satisfied with the previous part of the tour.

==== Domestic Version ====
The sub-title beginning episode 116 is Wise Online Travel (슬기로운랜선여행). The domestic version sticks to the original concept of the season.

== Cast ==
- Park Myung-soo (Episode 1–121)
- Yeo Hoe-hyun (Episode 1–6)
- Kim Saeng-min (Episode 1-18)
- Jung Joon-young (Episode 1-66)
- Park Na-rae (Episode 1-69)
- Moon Se-yoon (Episode 25–78)
- Heo Kyung-hwan (Episode 28–78)
- Han Hye-jin (Episode 79-115)
- Lee Yong-jin (Episode 79-115)
- Kyuhyun (Super Junior) (Episode 79-121)
- Kim Jun-ho (Episode 111–121)
- So Yi-hyun (Episode 116–121)

=== Changes to the cast ===
Yeo Hoe-hyun has stepped down from the show after the episode on December 30, 2017 due to his filming schedule. Since then, the show would invite guest(s) to go on tours together with the cast.

On April 3, 2018 it was announced that Kim Saeng-min has stepped down from the show following his recent apology for a past sexual harassment incident. There is no episode on April 7, in order for the production crew to re-edit the remaining of the Taiwan tour, which was already recorded before the news broke out.

On May 23, 2018 it was confirmed that Moon Se-yoon and Heo Kyung-hwan would join the show's permanent cast, with the former joining from the episode on May 26 and the latter to join from the episode on June 16.

On February 26, 2019 it was confirmed by tvN that Park Na-rae would be leaving the show after the Hong Kong-Macau tour episodes, with the possibility of having a new fixed cast member to replace her.

On March 12, 2019, it was confirmed by tvN that Jung Joon-young would step down from the show due to his involvement in the Burning Sun scandal. He would be edited out for the episodes that he has already recorded.

On May 8, 2019 tvN confirmed that the show would go into Season 2, with only Park Myung-soo from Season 1 to remain and Han Hye-jin, Lee Yong-jin and Kyuhyun (Super Junior) to join in as the fixed cast of the show.

On February 17, 2020 tvN confirmed that Kim Jun-ho would join the show's permanent cast, starting from the episode on the same day.

On June 10, 2020, tvN confirmed that Han Hye-jin has stepped down from the show, and So Yi-hyun would join the show's permanent cast. It is also assumed that Lee Yong-jin has stepped down from the show.

== Episodes (Season 1) ==
=== 2017 ===
List of episodes (episode 1–6)

Ep.	Broadcast Date	Tour #	Destination	Guest(s)	Winning Tour Guide(s)	Small Luxury	Note(s)
1 2 3	November 25 December 2 December 9	1	Japan (Osaka)	No guests	Jung Joon-young	One night stay at a Ryokan (Jung Joon-young chose Kim Saeng-min to accompany him)	—N/a
4 5 6	December 16 December 23 December 30	2	Thailand (Bangkok, Hua Hin)	No guests	Kim Saeng-min	Top class massage and spa (Kim Saeng-min chose Park Na-rae to accompany him)	Yeo Hoe-hyun's final tour before leaving the show

=== 2018 ===
List of episodes (episode 7–56)

Ep.	Broadcast Date	Tour #	Destination	Guest(s)	Winning Tour Guide(s)	Small Luxury	Note(s)
7	January 6	3	Hong Kong	Heo Kyung-hwan; Kyungri (Nine Muses)	Park Na-rae	Speakeasy Bar (Park Na-rae chose Heo Kyung-hwan to accompany her)	—N/a
8	January 13	3	Hong Kong	Heo Kyung-hwan; Kyungri (Nine Muses)	Park Na-rae	Speakeasy Bar (Park Na-rae chose Heo Kyung-hwan to accompany her)	—N/a
9	January 20	3	Hong Kong	Heo Kyung-hwan; Kyungri (Nine Muses)	Park Na-rae	Speakeasy Bar (Park Na-rae chose Heo Kyung-hwan to accompany her)	—N/a
10	January 27	3	Hong Kong	Heo Kyung-hwan; Kyungri (Nine Muses)	Park Na-rae	Speakeasy Bar (Park Na-rae chose Heo Kyung-hwan to accompany her)	—N/a
11	February 3	4	Japan (Fukuoka, Kitakyushu, Shimonoseki)	Microdot	Jung Joon-young	Huis Ten Bosch (Jung Joon-young chose Kim Saeng-min to accompany him)	No broadcast on February 17 due to Lunar New Year
12	February 10	4	Japan (Fukuoka, Kitakyushu, Shimonoseki)	Microdot	Jung Joon-young	Huis Ten Bosch (Jung Joon-young chose Kim Saeng-min to accompany him)	No broadcast on February 17 due to Lunar New Year
13	February 24	4	Japan (Fukuoka, Kitakyushu, Shimonoseki)	Microdot	Jung Joon-young	Huis Ten Bosch (Jung Joon-young chose Kim Saeng-min to accompany him)	No broadcast on February 17 due to Lunar New Year
14	March 3	5	Singapore	Heo Kyung-hwan; One; Kim Ji-min (Note: Only appeared in episode 17)	Park Na-rae (Note: Kim Ji-min will enjoy the Small Luxury in her place)	1-Altitude (Rooftop bar at One Raffles Place) (Kim Ji-min chose Park Myung-soo and Heo Kyung-hwan to accompany her)	Park Myung-soo is absent for episode 14; Park Na-rae is absent for episode 17
15	March 10	5	Singapore	Heo Kyung-hwan; One; Kim Ji-min	Park Na-rae	1-Altitude (Rooftop bar at One Raffles Place) (Kim Ji-min chose Park Myung-soo and Heo Kyung-hwan to accompany her)	Park Myung-soo is absent for episode 14; Park Na-rae is absent for episode 17
16	March 17	5	Malaysia (Johor Bahru)	Heo Kyung-hwan; One; Kim Ji-min	Park Na-rae	1-Altitude (Rooftop bar at One Raffles Place) (Kim Ji-min chose Park Myung-soo and Heo Kyung-hwan to accompany her)	Park Myung-soo is absent for episode 14; Park Na-rae is absent for episode 17
17	March 24	5	Singapore	Heo Kyung-hwan; One; Kim Ji-min	Park Na-rae	1-Altitude (Rooftop bar at One Raffles Place) (Kim Ji-min chose Park Myung-soo and Heo Kyung-hwan to accompany her)	Park Myung-soo is absent for episode 14; Park Na-rae is absent for episode 17
18	March 31	6	Taiwan (Taipei)	Hani (EXID)	Kim Saeng-min	National Palace Museum (Kim Saeng-min chose Hani to accompany him)	No broadcast on April 7; Kim Saeng-min has been edited out for the rest of the tour starting from episode 19 and has left the show
19	April 14	6	Taiwan (Taipei)	Hani (EXID)	Kim Saeng-min	National Palace Museum (Kim Saeng-min chose Hani to accompany him)	No broadcast on April 7; Kim Saeng-min has been edited out for the rest of the tour starting from episode 19 and has left the show
20	April 21	6	Taiwan (Taipei)	Hani (EXID)	Kim Saeng-min	National Palace Museum (Kim Saeng-min chose Hani to accompany him)	No broadcast on April 7; Kim Saeng-min has been edited out for the rest of the tour starting from episode 19 and has left the show
21	April 28	7	Russia (Vladivostok)	Microdot; JooE (Momoland)	Jung Joon-young	Custom cocktail bar (Jung Joon-young chose Microdot to accompany him)	N(A)
22	May 5	7	Russia (Vladivostok)	Microdot; JooE (Momoland)	Jung Joon-young	Custom cocktail bar (Jung Joon-young chose Microdot to accompany him)	N(A)
23	May 12	7	Russia (Vladivostok)	Microdot; JooE (Momoland)	Jung Joon-young	Custom cocktail bar (Jung Joon-young chose Microdot to accompany him)	N(A)
24	May 19	7	Russia (Vladivostok)	Microdot; JooE (Momoland)	Jung Joon-young	Custom cocktail bar (Jung Joon-young chose Microdot to accompany him)	N(A)
25	May 26	8	United States (Los Angeles)	Sunny (Girls' Generation); Chanyeol (EXO)	Jung Joon-young	The Beverly Hills Hotel (Jung Joon-young chose Chanyeol to accompany him)	Moon Se-yoon joined the show as part of the permanent cast from episode 25
26	June 2	8	United States (Los Angeles)	Sunny (Girls' Generation); Chanyeol (EXO)	Jung Joon-young	The Beverly Hills Hotel (Jung Joon-young chose Chanyeol to accompany him)	Moon Se-yoon joined the show as part of the permanent cast from episode 25
27	June 9	8	United States (Los Angeles)	Sunny (Girls' Generation); Chanyeol (EXO)	Jung Joon-young	The Beverly Hills Hotel (Jung Joon-young chose Chanyeol to accompany him)	Moon Se-yoon joined the show as part of the permanent cast from episode 25
28	June 16	9	United States (San Francisco)	Sunny (Girls' Generation); Chanyeol (EXO); Song Kang	Park Myung-soo	GoCar Tours + In Situ (Park Myung-soo chose Sunny to accompany him)	Heo Kyung-hwan joined the show as part of the permanent cast from episode 28; Moon Se-yoon and Park Na-rae are absent for the whole tour
29	June 23	9	United States (San Francisco)	Sunny (Girls' Generation); Chanyeol (EXO); Song Kang	Park Myung-soo	GoCar Tours + In Situ (Park Myung-soo chose Sunny to accompany him)	Heo Kyung-hwan joined the show as part of the permanent cast from episode 28; Moon Se-yoon and Park Na-rae are absent for the whole tour
30	June 30	9	United States (San Francisco)	Sunny (Girls' Generation); Chanyeol (EXO); Song Kang	Park Myung-soo	GoCar Tours + In Situ (Park Myung-soo chose Sunny to accompany him)	Heo Kyung-hwan joined the show as part of the permanent cast from episode 28; Moon Se-yoon and Park Na-rae are absent for the whole tour
31	July 7	10	Vietnam (Hanoi, Ninh Bình)	Yoo Min-sang; Jang Do-yeon; Parc Jae-jung (Note: Only appeared in episodes 33-35)	Park Na-rae	Top of Hanoi (Park Na-rae chose Jang Do-yeon to accompany her)	Close Friends Special; Heo Kyung-hwan is absent for the whole tour; Park Myung-soo is absent for episode 33
32	July 14	10	Vietnam (Hanoi, Ninh Bình)	Yoo Min-sang; Jang Do-yeon; Parc Jae-jung	Park Na-rae	Top of Hanoi (Park Na-rae chose Jang Do-yeon to accompany her)	Close Friends Special; Heo Kyung-hwan is absent for the whole tour; Park Myung-soo is absent for episode 33
33	July 21	10	Vietnam (Hanoi, Ninh Bình)	Yoo Min-sang; Jang Do-yeon; Parc Jae-jung	Park Na-rae	Top of Hanoi (Park Na-rae chose Jang Do-yeon to accompany her)	Close Friends Special; Heo Kyung-hwan is absent for the whole tour; Park Myung-soo is absent for episode 33
34	July 28	10	Vietnam (Hanoi, Ninh Bình)	Yoo Min-sang; Jang Do-yeon; Parc Jae-jung	Park Na-rae	Top of Hanoi (Park Na-rae chose Jang Do-yeon to accompany her)	Close Friends Special; Heo Kyung-hwan is absent for the whole tour; Park Myung-soo is absent for episode 33
35	August 4	10	Vietnam (Hanoi, Ninh Bình)	Yoo Min-sang; Jang Do-yeon; Parc Jae-jung	Park Na-rae	Top of Hanoi (Park Na-rae chose Jang Do-yeon to accompany her)	Close Friends Special; Heo Kyung-hwan is absent for the whole tour; Park Myung-soo is absent for episode 33
36	August 11	11	China (Xiamen)	Jo Se-ho; Seungri (Big Bang); Sejeong (Gugudan)	Jung Joon-young	Top class club in Xiamen (Jung Joon-young chose Seungri to accompany him)	Moon Se-yoon is absent for the whole tour; Seungri is the first guest to be a 1-day tour guide
37	August 18	11	China (Xiamen)	Jo Se-ho; Seungri (Big Bang); Sejeong (Gugudan)	Jung Joon-young	Top class club in Xiamen (Jung Joon-young chose Seungri to accompany him)	Moon Se-yoon is absent for the whole tour; Seungri is the first guest to be a 1-day tour guide
38	August 25	11	China (Xiamen)	Jo Se-ho; Seungri (Big Bang); Sejeong (Gugudan)	Jung Joon-young	Top class club in Xiamen (Jung Joon-young chose Seungri to accompany him)	Moon Se-yoon is absent for the whole tour; Seungri is the first guest to be a 1-day tour guide
39	September 1	11	China (Xiamen)	Jo Se-ho; Seungri (Big Bang); Sejeong (Gugudan)	Jung Joon-young	Top class club in Xiamen (Jung Joon-young chose Seungri to accompany him)	Moon Se-yoon is absent for the whole tour; Seungri is the first guest to be a 1-day tour guide
40	September 8	11	China (Xiamen)	Jo Se-ho; Seungri (Big Bang); Sejeong (Gugudan)	Jung Joon-young	Top class club in Xiamen (Jung Joon-young chose Seungri to accompany him)	Moon Se-yoon is absent for the whole tour; Seungri is the first guest to be a 1-day tour guide
41	September 15	12	Japan (Sapporo, Otaru)	Lee Soo-kyung	Heo Kyung-hwan + Moon Se-yoon	One night stay at a Ryokan	Heo Kyung-hwan and Moon Se-yoon worked together as the tour guides for Day 3
42	September 22	12	Japan (Sapporo, Otaru)	Lee Soo-kyung	Heo Kyung-hwan + Moon Se-yoon	One night stay at a Ryokan	Heo Kyung-hwan and Moon Se-yoon worked together as the tour guides for Day 3
43	September 29	12	Japan (Sapporo, Otaru)	Lee Soo-kyung	Heo Kyung-hwan + Moon Se-yoon	One night stay at a Ryokan	Heo Kyung-hwan and Moon Se-yoon worked together as the tour guides for Day 3
44	October 6	12	Japan (Sapporo, Otaru)	Lee Soo-kyung	Heo Kyung-hwan + Moon Se-yoon	One night stay at a Ryokan	Heo Kyung-hwan and Moon Se-yoon worked together as the tour guides for Day 3
45	October 13	13	Indonesia (Bali)	Hong Seok-cheon; Jang Do-yeon; Nayoung (Gugudan); Parc Jae-jung (Note: Only appeared in episodes 47-48)	Jung Joon-young	Bali style massage and Party bike (Jung Joon-young chose Hong Seok-cheon to accompany him)	Heo Kyung-hwan is absent for the whole tour; Park Na-rae is absent for Day 3 of the tour
46	October 20	13	Indonesia (Bali)	Hong Seok-cheon; Jang Do-yeon; Nayoung (Gugudan); Parc Jae-jung	Jung Joon-young	Bali style massage and Party bike (Jung Joon-young chose Hong Seok-cheon to accompany him)	Heo Kyung-hwan is absent for the whole tour; Park Na-rae is absent for Day 3 of the tour
47	October 27	13	Indonesia (Bali)	Hong Seok-cheon; Jang Do-yeon; Nayoung (Gugudan); Parc Jae-jung	Jung Joon-young	Bali style massage and Party bike (Jung Joon-young chose Hong Seok-cheon to accompany him)	Heo Kyung-hwan is absent for the whole tour; Park Na-rae is absent for Day 3 of the tour
48	November 3	13	Indonesia (Bali)	Hong Seok-cheon; Jang Do-yeon; Nayoung (Gugudan); Parc Jae-jung	Jung Joon-young	Bali style massage and Party bike (Jung Joon-young chose Hong Seok-cheon to accompany him)	Heo Kyung-hwan is absent for the whole tour; Park Na-rae is absent for Day 3 of the tour
49	November 10	14	Czech Republic (Prague)	Kim Jong-min; Hani (EXID)	Park Na-rae	One night stay at One Room Hotel (Park Na-rae chose Hani to accompany her)	1st Anniversary Special - Europe (Part 1); Kim Jong-min is the second guest to be a 1-day tour guide
50	November 17	14	Czech Republic (Prague)	Kim Jong-min; Hani (EXID)	Park Na-rae	One night stay at One Room Hotel (Park Na-rae chose Hani to accompany her)	1st Anniversary Special - Europe (Part 1); Kim Jong-min is the second guest to be a 1-day tour guide
51	November 24	14	Czech Republic (Prague)	Kim Jong-min; Hani (EXID)	Park Na-rae	One night stay at One Room Hotel (Park Na-rae chose Hani to accompany her)	1st Anniversary Special - Europe (Part 1); Kim Jong-min is the second guest to be a 1-day tour guide
52	December 1	14	Czech Republic (Prague)	Kim Jong-min; Hani (EXID)	Park Na-rae	One night stay at One Room Hotel (Park Na-rae chose Hani to accompany her)	1st Anniversary Special - Europe (Part 1); Kim Jong-min is the second guest to be a 1-day tour guide
53	December 8	15	Hungary (Budapest)	Hani (EXID); Yeo Hoe-hyun	Jung Joon-young	Helicopter tour (Jung Joon-young chose Yeo Hoe-hyun to accompany him)	1st Anniversary Special - Europe (Part 2); Park Na-rae is absent for the whole tour
54	December 15	15	Hungary (Budapest)	Hani (EXID); Yeo Hoe-hyun	Jung Joon-young	Helicopter tour (Jung Joon-young chose Yeo Hoe-hyun to accompany him)	1st Anniversary Special - Europe (Part 2); Park Na-rae is absent for the whole tour
55	December 22	15	Hungary (Budapest)	Hani (EXID); Yeo Hoe-hyun	Jung Joon-young	Helicopter tour (Jung Joon-young chose Yeo Hoe-hyun to accompany him)	1st Anniversary Special - Europe (Part 2); Park Na-rae is absent for the whole tour
56	December 29	15	Hungary (Budapest)	Hani (EXID); Yeo Hoe-hyun	Jung Joon-young	Helicopter tour (Jung Joon-young chose Yeo Hoe-hyun to accompany him)	1st Anniversary Special - Europe (Part 2); Park Na-rae is absent for the whole tour

=== 2019 ===
List of episodes (episode 57–78)

Ep.	Broadcast Date	Tour #	Destination	Guest(s)	Winning Tour Guide(s)	Small Luxury	Note(s)
57	January 5	16	Vietnam (Ho Chi Minh City, Mũi Né)	Sam Hammington; Cao Lu; Josh Carrott	Jung Joon-young	One night stay at The Reverie Saigon (Jung Joon-young is accompanied by Josh Carrott)	Global Friends Special; Moon Se-yoon is absent for the whole tour; Park Myung-soo and Heo Kyung-hwan worked together as the tour guides for Day 2
58	January 12	16	Vietnam (Ho Chi Minh City, Mũi Né)	Sam Hammington; Cao Lu; Josh Carrott	Jung Joon-young	One night stay at The Reverie Saigon (Jung Joon-young is accompanied by Josh Carrott)	Global Friends Special; Moon Se-yoon is absent for the whole tour; Park Myung-soo and Heo Kyung-hwan worked together as the tour guides for Day 2
59	January 19	16	Vietnam (Ho Chi Minh City, Mũi Né)	Sam Hammington; Cao Lu; Josh Carrott	Jung Joon-young	One night stay at The Reverie Saigon (Jung Joon-young is accompanied by Josh Carrott)	Global Friends Special; Moon Se-yoon is absent for the whole tour; Park Myung-soo and Heo Kyung-hwan worked together as the tour guides for Day 2
60	January 26	16	Vietnam (Ho Chi Minh City, Mũi Né)	Sam Hammington; Cao Lu; Josh Carrott	Jung Joon-young	One night stay at The Reverie Saigon (Jung Joon-young is accompanied by Josh Carrott)	Global Friends Special; Moon Se-yoon is absent for the whole tour; Park Myung-soo and Heo Kyung-hwan worked together as the tour guides for Day 2
61	February 2	16	Vietnam (Ho Chi Minh City, Mũi Né)	Sam Hammington; Cao Lu; Josh Carrott	Jung Joon-young	One night stay at The Reverie Saigon (Jung Joon-young is accompanied by Josh Carrott)	Global Friends Special; Moon Se-yoon is absent for the whole tour; Park Myung-soo and Heo Kyung-hwan worked together as the tour guides for Day 2
62	February 9	17	China (Shanghai, Suzhou)	Go Myung-sook (Note: Park Na-rae's mother); Lee Shin-hee (Note: Heo Kyung-hwan's mother); Choi Ok-hyang (Note: Moon Se-yoon's mother)	Heo Kyung-hwan	A meal at a hairy crab specialty restaurant (Heo Kyung-hwan gave it to the 3 guests to enjoy)	Filial Children Trip Special
63	February 16	17	China (Shanghai, Suzhou)	Go Myung-sook; Lee Shin-hee; Choi Ok-hyang	Heo Kyung-hwan	A meal at a hairy crab specialty restaurant (Heo Kyung-hwan gave it to the 3 guests to enjoy)	Filial Children Trip Special
64	February 23	17	China (Shanghai, Suzhou)	Go Myung-sook; Lee Shin-hee; Choi Ok-hyang	Heo Kyung-hwan	A meal at a hairy crab specialty restaurant (Heo Kyung-hwan gave it to the 3 guests to enjoy)	Filial Children Trip Special
65	March 2	17	China (Shanghai, Suzhou)	Go Myung-sook; Lee Shin-hee; Choi Ok-hyang	Heo Kyung-hwan	A meal at a hairy crab specialty restaurant (Heo Kyung-hwan gave it to the 3 guests to enjoy)	Filial Children Trip Special
66	March 9	18	Hong Kong; Macau	Kim Jong-min; Shin Ji	Park Na-rae	—N/a	Thank You Special - Park Na-rae's final tour before leaving the show; Kim Jong-min's second time being a 1-day tour guide; Heo Kyung-hwan and Moon Se-yoon worked together as the tour guides for Day 2; Jung Joon-young has been edited out for the rest of the tour starting from episode 67 and has left the show
67	March 16	18	Hong Kong; Macau	Kim Jong-min; Shin Ji	Park Na-rae	—N/a	Thank You Special - Park Na-rae's final tour before leaving the show; Kim Jong-min's second time being a 1-day tour guide; Heo Kyung-hwan and Moon Se-yoon worked together as the tour guides for Day 2; Jung Joon-young has been edited out for the rest of the tour starting from episode 67 and has left the show
68	March 23	18	Hong Kong; Macau	Kim Jong-min; Shin Ji	Park Na-rae	—N/a	Thank You Special - Park Na-rae's final tour before leaving the show; Kim Jong-min's second time being a 1-day tour guide; Heo Kyung-hwan and Moon Se-yoon worked together as the tour guides for Day 2; Jung Joon-young has been edited out for the rest of the tour starting from episode 67 and has left the show
69	March 30	18	Hong Kong; Macau	Kim Jong-min; Shin Ji	Park Na-rae	—N/a	Thank You Special - Park Na-rae's final tour before leaving the show; Kim Jong-min's second time being a 1-day tour guide; Heo Kyung-hwan and Moon Se-yoon worked together as the tour guides for Day 2; Jung Joon-young has been edited out for the rest of the tour starting from episode 67 and has left the show
70	April 6	19	Turkey (Istanbul)	Yoo Min-sang; Hani (EXID)	Hani	—N/a (Note: The scenes of Hani (and Jung Joon-young who has been edited out) enjoying the small luxury were supposedly edited out)	Brotherhood Special; Moon Se-yoon and Yoo Min-sang worked together as the tour guides for Day 1, while Hani (and supposedly Jung Joon-young) is the tour guide for Day 2; Jung Joon-young has been edited out for the entire tour
71	April 13	19	Turkey (Istanbul)	Yoo Min-sang; Hani (EXID)	Hani	—N/a	Brotherhood Special; Moon Se-yoon and Yoo Min-sang worked together as the tour guides for Day 1, while Hani (and supposedly Jung Joon-young) is the tour guide for Day 2; Jung Joon-young has been edited out for the entire tour
72	April 20	20	Turkey (Cappadocia)	Ji Sang-ryeol; Kim Dong-hyun; Hani (EXID)	Ji Sang-ryeol + Kim Dong-hyun	Hot air balloon tour	Rivalry Special; Park Myung-soo and Heo Kyung-hwan worked together as the tour guides for Day 1, while Ji Sang-ryeol and Kim Dong-hyun worked together as the tour guides for Day 2; Moon Se-yoon is absent for the whole tour; Jung Joon-young has been edited out for the entire tour
73	April 27	20	Turkey (Cappadocia)	Ji Sang-ryeol; Kim Dong-hyun; Hani (EXID)	Ji Sang-ryeol + Kim Dong-hyun	Hot air balloon tour	Rivalry Special; Park Myung-soo and Heo Kyung-hwan worked together as the tour guides for Day 1, while Ji Sang-ryeol and Kim Dong-hyun worked together as the tour guides for Day 2; Moon Se-yoon is absent for the whole tour; Jung Joon-young has been edited out for the entire tour
74	May 4	20	Turkey (Cappadocia)	Ji Sang-ryeol; Kim Dong-hyun; Hani (EXID)	Ji Sang-ryeol + Kim Dong-hyun	Hot air balloon tour	Rivalry Special; Park Myung-soo and Heo Kyung-hwan worked together as the tour guides for Day 1, while Ji Sang-ryeol and Kim Dong-hyun worked together as the tour guides for Day 2; Moon Se-yoon is absent for the whole tour; Jung Joon-young has been edited out for the entire tour
75	May 11	21	Japan (Tokyo, Yokohama)	Boom; Hwang Je-sung; Jung Hye-sung	Jung Hye-sung	Teppanyaki meal at a restaurant (Jung Hye-sung chose Park Myung-soo to accompany her)	Tokyo Spring Breeze Special; First tour to have only guests as tour guides; Final tour of Season 1; Special appearance by Takuya Terada in episode 75; Broadcast timing for episode 76 had changed to 21:00 (KST) instead of the usual 22:30 (KST) due to the special airing of The Witch: Part 1. The Subversion at the latter timing; Boom is absent for Day 3 of the tour
76	May 18	21	Japan (Tokyo, Yokohama)	Boom; Hwang Je-sung; Jung Hye-sung	Jung Hye-sung	Teppanyaki meal at a restaurant (Jung Hye-sung chose Park Myung-soo to accompany her)	Tokyo Spring Breeze Special; First tour to have only guests as tour guides; Final tour of Season 1; Special appearance by Takuya Terada in episode 75; Broadcast timing for episode 76 had changed to 21:00 (KST) instead of the usual 22:30 (KST) due to the special airing of The Witch: Part 1. The Subversion at the latter timing; Boom is absent for Day 3 of the tour
77	May 25	21	Japan (Tokyo, Yokohama)	Boom; Hwang Je-sung; Jung Hye-sung	Jung Hye-sung	Teppanyaki meal at a restaurant (Jung Hye-sung chose Park Myung-soo to accompany her)	Tokyo Spring Breeze Special; First tour to have only guests as tour guides; Final tour of Season 1; Special appearance by Takuya Terada in episode 75; Broadcast timing for episode 76 had changed to 21:00 (KST) instead of the usual 22:30 (KST) due to the special airing of The Witch: Part 1. The Subversion at the latter timing; Boom is absent for Day 3 of the tour
78	June 1	21	Japan (Tokyo, Yokohama)	Boom; Hwang Je-sung; Jung Hye-sung	Jung Hye-sung	Teppanyaki meal at a restaurant (Jung Hye-sung chose Park Myung-soo to accompany her)	Tokyo Spring Breeze Special; First tour to have only guests as tour guides; Final tour of Season 1; Special appearance by Takuya Terada in episode 75; Broadcast timing for episode 76 had changed to 21:00 (KST) instead of the usual 22:30 (KST) due to the special airing of The Witch: Part 1. The Subversion at the latter timing; Boom is absent for Day 3 of the tour

== Episodes (Season 2 — More Salty Tour) ==
=== 2019 ===
List of episodes (episode 79–104 + special)

Ep.	Season 2 Ep.	Broadcast Date	Tour #	Destination	Guest(s)	Winning Tour Guide(s)	Note(s)
79	1	June 17	1	Taiwan (Kaohsiung, Tainan)	Hwang Kwang-hee; JooE (Momoland) (Note: Only appeared in episodes 81-83)	Kyuhyun	Special appearance by Lai Kuan-lin in episode 82
80	2	June 24	1	Taiwan (Kaohsiung, Tainan)	Hwang Kwang-hee; JooE (Momoland)	Kyuhyun	Special appearance by Lai Kuan-lin in episode 82
81	3	July 1	1	Taiwan (Kaohsiung, Tainan)	Hwang Kwang-hee; JooE (Momoland)	Kyuhyun	Special appearance by Lai Kuan-lin in episode 82
82	4	July 8	1	Taiwan (Kaohsiung, Tainan)	Hwang Kwang-hee; JooE (Momoland)	Kyuhyun	Special appearance by Lai Kuan-lin in episode 82
83	5	July 15	1	Taiwan (Kaohsiung, Tainan)	Hwang Kwang-hee; JooE (Momoland)	Kyuhyun	Special appearance by Lai Kuan-lin in episode 82
83	5	July 15	2	Thailand (Bangkok, Chiang Mai)	Lee Jin-ho; Shin Ye-eun	Han Hye-jin	Lee Jin-ho is absent for the last part of Day 3 of the tour
84	6	July 22	2	Thailand (Bangkok, Chiang Mai)	Lee Jin-ho; Shin Ye-eun	Han Hye-jin	Lee Jin-ho is absent for the last part of Day 3 of the tour
85	7	July 29	2	Thailand (Bangkok, Chiang Mai)	Lee Jin-ho; Shin Ye-eun	Han Hye-jin	Lee Jin-ho is absent for the last part of Day 3 of the tour
86	8	August 5	2	Thailand (Bangkok, Chiang Mai)	Lee Jin-ho; Shin Ye-eun	Han Hye-jin	Lee Jin-ho is absent for the last part of Day 3 of the tour
87	9	August 12	3	Russia (Moscow)	Hwang Kwang-hee; Jin Hae-sung; Jin Se-yeon	Lee Yong-jin + Hwang Kwang-hee + Jin Hae-sung	Couple special; Kyuhyun and Jin Se-yeon worked together as the tour guides for Day 1, Park Myung-soo and Han Hye-jin worked together as the tour guides for Day 2, and Lee Yong-jin, Hwang Kwang-hee and Jin Hae-sung worked together as the tour guides for Day 3
88	10	August 19	3	Russia (Moscow)	Hwang Kwang-hee; Jin Hae-sung; Jin Se-yeon	Lee Yong-jin + Hwang Kwang-hee + Jin Hae-sung	Couple special; Kyuhyun and Jin Se-yeon worked together as the tour guides for Day 1, Park Myung-soo and Han Hye-jin worked together as the tour guides for Day 2, and Lee Yong-jin, Hwang Kwang-hee and Jin Hae-sung worked together as the tour guides for Day 3
89	11	August 26	3	Russia (Moscow)	Hwang Kwang-hee; Jin Hae-sung; Jin Se-yeon	Lee Yong-jin + Hwang Kwang-hee + Jin Hae-sung	Couple special; Kyuhyun and Jin Se-yeon worked together as the tour guides for Day 1, Park Myung-soo and Han Hye-jin worked together as the tour guides for Day 2, and Lee Yong-jin, Hwang Kwang-hee and Jin Hae-sung worked together as the tour guides for Day 3
90	12	September 2	3	Russia (Moscow)	Hwang Kwang-hee; Jin Hae-sung; Jin Se-yeon	Lee Yong-jin + Hwang Kwang-hee + Jin Hae-sung	Couple special; Kyuhyun and Jin Se-yeon worked together as the tour guides for Day 1, Park Myung-soo and Han Hye-jin worked together as the tour guides for Day 2, and Lee Yong-jin, Hwang Kwang-hee and Jin Hae-sung worked together as the tour guides for Day 3
91	13	September 9	3	Russia (Moscow)	Hwang Kwang-hee; Jin Hae-sung; Jin Se-yeon	Lee Yong-jin + Hwang Kwang-hee + Jin Hae-sung	Couple special; Kyuhyun and Jin Se-yeon worked together as the tour guides for Day 1, Park Myung-soo and Han Hye-jin worked together as the tour guides for Day 2, and Lee Yong-jin, Hwang Kwang-hee and Jin Hae-sung worked together as the tour guides for Day 3
92	14	September 16	4	Malaysia (Kuala Lumpur, Malacca)	Sam Okyere; Chuu (Loona)	Lee Yong-jin	Real Victory special
93	15	September 23	4	Malaysia (Kuala Lumpur, Malacca)	Sam Okyere; Chuu (Loona)	Lee Yong-jin	Real Victory special
94	16	September 30	4	Malaysia (Kuala Lumpur, Malacca)	Sam Okyere; Chuu (Loona)	Lee Yong-jin	Real Victory special
95	17	October 7	4	Malaysia (Kuala Lumpur, Malacca)	Sam Okyere; Chuu (Loona)	Lee Yong-jin	Real Victory special
96	18	October 14	5	China (Chongqing, Chengdu)	Kim Jun-ho; Sam Hammington; Hong Yoon-hwa	Kyuhyun	Lee Yong-jin is absent for the whole tour; Kim Jun-ho stood in to be a 1-day tour guide for Day 2 (the first guest to be a 1-day tour guide for this season); Kyuhyun is absent for Day 1 of the tour
97	19	October 21	5	China (Chongqing, Chengdu)	Kim Jun-ho; Sam Hammington; Hong Yoon-hwa	Kyuhyun	Lee Yong-jin is absent for the whole tour; Kim Jun-ho stood in to be a 1-day tour guide for Day 2 (the first guest to be a 1-day tour guide for this season); Kyuhyun is absent for Day 1 of the tour
98	20	October 28	5	China (Chongqing, Chengdu)	Kim Jun-ho; Sam Hammington; Hong Yoon-hwa	Kyuhyun	Lee Yong-jin is absent for the whole tour; Kim Jun-ho stood in to be a 1-day tour guide for Day 2 (the first guest to be a 1-day tour guide for this season); Kyuhyun is absent for Day 1 of the tour
99	21	November 4	5	China (Chongqing, Chengdu)	Kim Jun-ho; Sam Hammington; Hong Yoon-hwa	Kyuhyun	Lee Yong-jin is absent for the whole tour; Kim Jun-ho stood in to be a 1-day tour guide for Day 2 (the first guest to be a 1-day tour guide for this season); Kyuhyun is absent for Day 1 of the tour
100	22	November 11	6	Vietnam (Nha Trang, Da Lat)	Moon Se-yoon; Lee Yi-kyung; Lee Si-a; Lee Jin-ho (Note: Only appeared in episodes 102-104)	Park Myung-soo + Moon Se-yoon	100th episode special; Kyuhyun is absent for the whole tour; Moon Se-yoon stood in and worked together with Park Myung-soo as the tour guides for Day 2
101	23	November 18	6	Vietnam (Nha Trang, Da Lat)	Moon Se-yoon; Lee Yi-kyung; Lee Si-a; Lee Jin-ho	Park Myung-soo + Moon Se-yoon	100th episode special; Kyuhyun is absent for the whole tour; Moon Se-yoon stood in and worked together with Park Myung-soo as the tour guides for Day 2
102	24	November 25	6	Vietnam (Nha Trang, Da Lat)	Moon Se-yoon; Lee Yi-kyung; Lee Si-a; Lee Jin-ho	Park Myung-soo + Moon Se-yoon	100th episode special; Kyuhyun is absent for the whole tour; Moon Se-yoon stood in and worked together with Park Myung-soo as the tour guides for Day 2
103	25	December 2	6	Vietnam (Nha Trang, Da Lat)	Moon Se-yoon; Lee Yi-kyung; Lee Si-a; Lee Jin-ho	Park Myung-soo + Moon Se-yoon	100th episode special; Kyuhyun is absent for the whole tour; Moon Se-yoon stood in and worked together with Park Myung-soo as the tour guides for Day 2
104	26	December 9	6	Vietnam (Nha Trang, Da Lat)	Moon Se-yoon; Lee Yi-kyung; Lee Si-a; Lee Jin-ho	Park Myung-soo + Moon Se-yoon	100th episode special; Kyuhyun is absent for the whole tour; Moon Se-yoon stood in and worked together with Park Myung-soo as the tour guides for Day 2
Special	—	December 16	—N/a	—N/a	—N/a	—N/a	Year End Summary of the Best Special; Kyuhyun is absent for the entire segment
No broadcast on December 23 and December 30

=== 2020 ===
List of episodes (episode 105–121)

Ep.	Season 2 Ep.	Broadcast Date	Tour #	Destination	Guest(s)	Winning Tour Guide(s)	Note(s)
105	27	January 6	7	Spain (Seville, Ronda, Zahara de la Sierra)	Lee Yoo-jin; Joy (Red Velvet)	Lee Yong-jin	Park Myung-soo is absent for episode 105
106	28	January 13	7	Spain (Seville, Ronda, Zahara de la Sierra)	Lee Yoo-jin; Joy (Red Velvet)	Lee Yong-jin	Park Myung-soo is absent for episode 105
107	29	January 20	7	Spain (Seville, Ronda, Zahara de la Sierra)	Lee Yoo-jin; Joy (Red Velvet)	Lee Yong-jin	Park Myung-soo is absent for episode 105
108	30	January 27	8	Portugal (Lisbon)	Kim Jun-ho; Jang Dong-min; Seunghee (Oh My Girl)	Kim Jun-ho	Lee Yong-jin is absent for the whole tour; Kim Jun-ho stood in to be a 1-day tour guide
109	31	February 3	8	Portugal (Lisbon)	Kim Jun-ho; Jang Dong-min; Seunghee (Oh My Girl)	Kim Jun-ho	Lee Yong-jin is absent for the whole tour; Kim Jun-ho stood in to be a 1-day tour guide
110	32	February 10	8	Portugal (Lisbon)	Kim Jun-ho; Jang Dong-min; Seunghee (Oh My Girl)	Kim Jun-ho	Lee Yong-jin is absent for the whole tour; Kim Jun-ho stood in to be a 1-day tour guide
111	33	February 17	9	South Korea (Ganghwa County)	Heo Kyung-hwan; Lee Jin-ho; Hong Yoon-hwa; Chuu (Loona); Hwang Je-sung (Note: Only appeared in episode 112)	Park Myung-soo	Kim Jun-ho joined the show as part of the permanent cast from episode 111; First ever domestic tour since the start of the show; New format of guided tours introduced starting from this tour (2 different tours held on the same day); Han Hye-jin's final tour as part of the permanent cast
112	34	February 24	9	South Korea (Ganghwa County)	Heo Kyung-hwan; Lee Jin-ho; Hong Yoon-hwa; Chuu (Loona); Hwang Je-sung	Park Myung-soo	Kim Jun-ho joined the show as part of the permanent cast from episode 111; First ever domestic tour since the start of the show; New format of guided tours introduced starting from this tour (2 different tours held on the same day); Han Hye-jin's final tour as part of the permanent cast
113	35	March 2	10	South Korea (Seoul)	Ham So-won; Sleepy; Chanmi (AOA); Lee Jin-hyuk (UP10TION)	Ham So-won + Sleepy	Originally the tour would be filmed in Taiwan, with only Lee Jin-hyuk as guest. However, due to the COVID-19 pandemic, filming location has changed to the current destination; Second tour to have only guests as tour guides; Ham So-won and Sleepy worked together as the tour guides for their SoPy Tour, while Chanmi and Lee Jin-hyuk worked together as the tour guides for their JinMi Tour; Kyuhyun is absent for the whole tour
114	36	March 9	10	South Korea (Seoul)	Ham So-won; Sleepy; Chanmi (AOA); Lee Jin-hyuk (UP10TION)	Ham So-won + Sleepy	Originally the tour would be filmed in Taiwan, with only Lee Jin-hyuk as guest. However, due to the COVID-19 pandemic, filming location has changed to the current destination; Second tour to have only guests as tour guides; Ham So-won and Sleepy worked together as the tour guides for their SoPy Tour, while Chanmi and Lee Jin-hyuk worked together as the tour guides for their JinMi Tour; Kyuhyun is absent for the whole tour
114	36	March 9	11	South Korea (Gangwon Province)	Ham So-won; DinDin; Chanmi (AOA); Lee Jin-hyuk (UP10TION)	Lee Yong-jin	Kyuhyun is absent for the whole tour; Lee Yong-jin's final tour as part of the permanent cast
115	37	March 16	11	South Korea (Gangwon Province)	Ham So-won; DinDin; Chanmi (AOA); Lee Jin-hyuk (UP10TION)	Lee Yong-jin	Kyuhyun is absent for the whole tour; Lee Yong-jin's final tour as part of the permanent cast
The show was on a hiatus due to the severity of the COVID-19 pandemic. All tours from episode 116 will be within South Korea.
116	38	June 30	12	Jeju Island	Kim Jong-min; Joy (Red Velvet)	Park Myung-soo	So Yi-hyun joined the show as part of the permanent cast from episode 116
117	39	July 7	12	Jeju Island	Kim Jong-min; Joy (Red Velvet)	Park Myung-soo	So Yi-hyun joined the show as part of the permanent cast from episode 116
118	40	July 14	13	South Gyeongsang Province (Tongyeong, Geoje), Busan	In Gyo-jin; Heo Kyung-hwan; Arin (Oh My Girl)	Heo Kyung-hwan	Heo Kyung-kwan is the first guest to be a 1-day tour guide since the reboot
119	41	July 21	13	South Gyeongsang Province (Tongyeong, Geoje), Busan	In Gyo-jin; Heo Kyung-hwan; Arin (Oh My Girl)	Heo Kyung-hwan	Heo Kyung-kwan is the first guest to be a 1-day tour guide since the reboot
120	42	July 28	13	South Gyeongsang Province (Tongyeong, Geoje), Busan	In Gyo-jin; Heo Kyung-hwan; Arin (Oh My Girl)	Heo Kyung-hwan	Heo Kyung-kwan is the first guest to be a 1-day tour guide since the reboot
120	42	July 28	14	North Chungcheong Province (Jecheon), Gangwon Province (Donghae)	Park Sung-kwang; Hong Hyun-hee (Note: Only appeared in episode 120); Kim Soo-chan (Note: Only appeared in episode 121); Joy (Red Velvet)	Kim Jun-ho	Final tour of the series
121	43	August 4	14	North Chungcheong Province (Jecheon), Gangwon Province (Donghae)	Park Sung-kwang; Hong Hyun-hee; Kim Soo-chan; Joy (Red Velvet)	Kim Jun-ho	Final tour of the series

== Ratings ==
In the ratings below, the highest rating for the show will be in red, and the lowest rating for the show will be in blue each year.

=== Season 1 ===
2017

List of ratings (episode 1–6)

Ep. #	Broadcast date	Average audience share		
Ep. #	Broadcast date	AGB Nielsen		TNmS Ratings
Ep. #	Broadcast date	Nationwide	Seoul Capital Area	Nationwide
1	November 25	2.934%	3.394%	3.1%
2	December 2	3.110%	3.251%	2.9%
3	December 9	2.903%	3.371%	3.0%
4	December 16	3.101%	3.317%	2.9%
5	December 23	3.607%	3.805%	3.2%
6	December 30	3.053%	3.534%	3.2%

2018

List of ratings (episode 7–56)

Ep. #	Broadcast date	Average audience share		
Ep. #	Broadcast date	AGB Nielsen		TNmS Ratings
Ep. #	Broadcast date	Nationwide	Seoul Capital Area	Nationwide
7	January 6	3.153%	3.435%	4.2%
8	January 13	4.120%	4.478%	4.1%
9	January 20	3.668%	4.558%	3.8%
10	January 27	3.826%	4.622%	4.2%
11	February 3	3.407%	3.859%	4.2%
12	February 10	3.976%	4.686%	4.3%
13	February 24	2.619%	3.080%	3.0%
14	March 3	3.425%	4.221%	3.6%
15	March 10	3.363%	3.643%	3.4%
16	March 17	3.836%	5.011%	3.5%
17	March 24	3.406%	4.457%	2.8%
18	March 31	3.549%	4.219%	3.1%
19	April 14	2.760%	3.168%	3.2%
20	April 21	3.321%	4.583%	2.7%
21	April 28	3.433%	4.316%	2.9%
22	May 5	2.770%	3.321%	2.9%
23	May 12	3.275%	4.103%	3.7%
24	May 19	3.090%	4.022%	2.8%
25	May 26	3.611%	3.996%	3.6%
26	June 2	3.539%	4.324%	NR
27	June 9	3.599%	4.561%	NR
28	June 16	2.584%	3.538%	NR
29	June 23	2.732%	3.217%	NR
30	June 30	2.653%	3.545%	NR
31	July 7	3.691%	4.225%	NR
32	July 14	3.359%	3.952%	NR
33	July 21	3.578%	4.013%	NR
34	July 28	3.982%	5.218%	NR
35	August 4	3.612%	4.281%	NR
36	August 11	3.932%	5.037%	NR
37	August 18	3.591%	4.753%	NR
38	August 25	3.941%	5.054%	NR
39	September 1	2.704%	3.100%	NR
40	September 8	3.668%	4.627%	NR
41	September 15	3.442%	4.228%	NR
42	September 22	3.500%	4.112%	NR
43	September 29	3.406%	4.440%	NR
44	October 6	3.155%	3.613%	NR
45	October 13	3.034%	3.594%	NR
46	October 20	2.823%	3.492%	NR
47	October 27	2.515%	3.089%	NR
48	November 3	2.565%	3.277%	NR
49	November 10	3.103%	3.917%	NR
50	November 17	3.115%	4.086%	NR
51	November 24	3.012%	3.825%	NR
52	December 1	3.144%	3.927%	NR
53	December 8	2.568%	3.009%	NR
54	December 15	1.942%	2.251%	NR
55	December 22	2.400%	2.712%	NR
56	December 29	2.276%	3.012%	NR

2019

List of ratings (episode 57–78)

Ep. #	Broadcast date	Average audience share	
Ep. #	Broadcast date	AGB Nielsen	
Ep. #	Broadcast date	Nationwide	Seoul Capital Area
57	January 5	3.237%	4.204%
58	January 12	2.643%	3.250%
59	January 19	2.890%	3.547%
60	January 26	2.043%	2.416%
61	February 2	2.448%	3.210%
62	February 9	2.925%	3.579%
63	February 16	2.683%	3.373%
64	February 23	—N/a (Note: There is no actual confirmation on the actual rating due to sources not being able to show the ratings for this episode)	—N/a
65	March 2	2.064%	2.431%
66	March 9	2.309%	2.473%
67	March 16	2.311%	2.776%
68	March 23	2.161%	2.276%
69	March 30	2.440%	3.195%
70	April 6	2.054%	2.318%
71	April 13	2.049%	2.185%
72	April 20	1.661%	1.883%
73	April 27	2.401%	3.085%
74	May 4	2.107%	2.494%
75	May 11	2.608%	3.105%
76	May 18	2.428%	3.254%
77	May 25	2.236%	2.824%
78	June 1	2.089%	2.547%

=== Season 2 ===
2019

List of ratings (episode 79–104)

Ep. #	Broadcast date	Average audience share	
Ep. #	Broadcast date	AGB Nielsen	
Ep. #	Broadcast date	Nationwide	Seoul Capital Area
79	June 17	2.237%	2.670%
80	June 24	1.807%	2.156%
81	July 1	1.322%	1.390%
82	July 8	1.830%	2.056%
83	July 15	1.429%	1.684%
84	July 22	1.618%	1.931%
85	July 29	1.532%	1.632%
86	August 5	1.731%	1.984%
87	August 12	2.028%	2.305%
88	August 19	1.741%	2.095%
89	August 26	1.897%	2.394%
90	September 2	1.385%	1.790%
91	September 9	1.527%	2.139%
92	September 16	1.257%	1.645%
93	September 23	1.338%	NR
94	September 30	1.588%	1.713%
95	October 7	1.555%	1.950%
96	October 14	1.608%	1.880%
97	October 21	1.718%	2.268%
98	October 28	1.658%	2.092%
99	November 4	1.594%	1.859%
100	November 11	1.570%	1.790%
101	November 18	1.812%	2.164%
102	November 25	1.861%	1.943%
103	December 2	1.451%	1.697%
104	December 9	1.587%	1.587%
Special	December 16	1.033%	1.094%

2020

List of ratings (episode 105–121)

Ep. #	Broadcast date	Average audience share	
Ep. #	Broadcast date	AGB Nielsen	
Ep. #	Broadcast date	Nationwide	Seoul Capital Area
105	January 6	1.602%	1.770%
106	January 13	1.596%	1.902%
107	January 20	1.668%	1.793%
108	January 27	1.476%	NR
109	February 3	1.467%	1.525%
110	February 10	1.649%	1.752%
111	February 17	1.841%	2.559%
112	February 24	1.350%	NR
113	March 2	1.590%	NR
114	March 9	1.058%	NR
115	March 16	1.236%	NR
116	June 30	1.700%	1.991%
117	July 7	1.155%	1.426%
118	July 14	1.961%	2.339%
119	July 21	1.321%	1.324%
120	July 28	1.360%	1.628%
121	August 4	1.204%	NR

- Note that the show airs on a cable channel (pay TV), which plays part in its slower uptake and relatively small audience share when compared to programs broadcast (FTA) on public networks such as KBS, SBS, MBC or EBS.
- NR rating means "not reported".
- TNmS have stopped publishing their rating report from June 2018.
