= My Little Old Boy =

South Korean television program

- Also known as: Mom's Diary: My Ugly Duckling
- Hangul: 미운 우리 새끼
- RR: Miun uri saekki
- MR: Miun uri saekki
- Genre: Reality television
- Written by: Yook So-young; Kang Seung-hui; Choi Seung-yeon; Sin Yu-jin; Yeon Cho-rong; Kim Ji-ye; Kim Hyeon-jin; Choi Na-mu
- Directed by: Kwak Seung-yeong; Choi So-hyeong; Ryu Ji-hwan
- Starring: Current host: Shin Dong-yup; Seo Jang-hoon; Current cast: Mother: Kim Sun-ja; Lee Shin-hee; Kim Pan-rye; Seo Young-nam; Yun Ji-young; Choi In-sook; Seo Jin-sook; Lee Ae-ja; Yang Mi-hye; Kim Kyung-ja; Son/Daughter: Tak Jae-hun; Lim Won-Hee; Kim Hee-chul; Heo Kyung-hwan; Lee Dong-gun; Han Hye-jin; Choi Jin Hyuk; Yoon Hyun-min; Yoon Shi-yoon; Jung Young-joo; Yoon Min Soo
- Opening theme: My Son (Kim Gun-mo) (ep 1–167)
- Ending theme: My Son (Kim Gun-mo) (ep 1–167)
- Country of origin: South Korea
- Original language: Korean
- No. of seasons: 1
- No. of episodes: 313 + 1 Pilot (list of episodes)

Production
- Production location: South Korea
- Camera setup: Multi-camera
- Running time: 120 Minutes
- Production company: SBS

Original release
- Network: SBS
- Release: August 26, 2016 – present

Related
- Dolsing Fourmen; Reckless but Happy

My Little Old Boy (Korean: 미운 우리 새끼), also called Mom's Diary: My Ugly Duckling, is a South Korean television entertainment program, distributed and syndicated by SBS every Sunday at 21:05 (KST), starting from August 26, 2016.

== Overview ==
This reality program focuses on the mothers of South Korean celebrities. Unlike the generic reality program which focuses solely on the celebrity, My Little Old Boy features commentary from the celebrities' mothers as they watch the footage of their sons and or daughters' daily activities.

I wonder who my son was meeting today and what he heard... Why do you look so sad today or why do you look so excited? Why are you stretching and why are you so sleepy? How much do you know about your son?

— SBS, Program info

== Changes in running time ==
Air date	Air time	Running time
July 20, 2016 (Pilot)	23:10 – 00:30	80 Minutes
Aired every Friday
August 26, 2016 – April 7, 2017	23:20 – 00:50	90 Minutes
Aired every Sunday
April 16 – October 15, 2017	Part 1: 21:15 – 22:00	45 Minutes
April 16 – October 15, 2017	Part 2: 22:00 – 23:05	65 Minutes
October 22, 2017 – March 31, 2019	Part 1: 21:05 – 22:00	55 Minutes
October 22, 2017 – March 31, 2019	Part 2: 22:00 – 23:05	65 Minutes
April 7, 2019 – June 27, 2021	Part 1: 21:05 – 21:45	40 Minutes
April 7, 2019 – June 27, 2021	Part 2: 21:45 – 22:25	40 Minutes
April 7, 2019 – June 27, 2021	Part 3: 22:25 – 23:05	40 Minutes
July 4, 2021 – Present	21:05 – 23:05	2 hours

== Hosts ==
=== Main ===
- Shin Dong-yup
- Seo Jang-hoon

== Casts ==
=== Current regular casts ===
- Lee Sang-min
- Kim Jong Kook
- Kim Hee-chul (Super Junior)
- Tak Jae-hoon
- Im Won Hee
- Bae Jung-nam
- Choi Jin Hyuk
- Heo Kyung-hwan
- Lee Dong-gun
- Han Hye-jin (model)
- Kim Seung-soo
- Yoon Hyun-min
- Yoon Shi-yoon

== List of episodes ==
Year	Episodes	Originally released	
Year	Episodes	First released	Last released
Pilot	1	July 20, 2016	July 20, 2016
2016	18	August 26, 2016	December 30, 2016
2017	50	January 6, 2017	December 24, 2017
2018	53	January 7, 2018	December 30, 2018
2019	51	January 6, 2019	December 29, 2019
2020	52	January 2, 2020	December 26, 2020
2021	51	January 2, 2021	December 26, 2021
2022	49	January 2, 2022	December 25, 2022
2023	50	January 1, 2023	December 31, 2023
2024	49	January 7, 2024	December 22, 2024
2025	52	January 5, 2025	December 28, 2025
2026	TBA	January 4, 2026	TBA

== List of guests ==
Name	Episodes
Kim Jong-min	1–2, 5–6, 8, 17, 25, 31–34, 36, 39, 45, 48–49, 54, 58, 61–63, 82–84, 87, 89, 96–97, 98, 105, 107, 120, 127, 139, 144, 233–234, 295
Son Hun-soo	1–3, 5–7, 11–12, 20, 22, 27–28, 36–37, 44, 50, 106, 115, 132, 140, 148–149, 171
Joo Byung-Jin	68, 70
Ji Sang-ryeol	2, 5–6, 9–10, 25, 93, 178–179, 184, 186, 192, 201–202, 220, 225, 236, 239, 275, 278, 288–289, 295
Kim Sung-soo	2
Yoon Jung-soo	2–3, 5–6, 11–12, 21–23, 25, 31–32, 35, 44, 47–48, 50, 53–55, 58, 78, 86, 95, 99, 101, 103, 106, 132, 154, 163, 171, 176, 180
Kim Jae-duck	4, 6, 8, 9, 11, 18, 22, 24, 26, 28, 30, 33, 37, 39, 41, 43, 49, 51
Gugudan	5
Hwangbo	6, 47, 300
Byun Young-joo	7
Lee Hae-young	7
Kim In-suk	13, 17
Lee Soo-geun	15, 36–38, 50, 168, 175
Kim Heung-gook	15, 25, 33, 48–49, 51, 64
Moon Hee-joon	20, 22
Chun Myung-hoon	20, 22
Danny Ahn	20, 22, 43
Jo Woo-jong	25, 168
AOA	25
Kangta	26, 39, 41
Yang Se-hyung	26, 74
Cosmic Girls	27
Monsta X	27
You Hee-yeol	27–28
Yang Hyun-suk	27–28
Park Jin-young	27–28
Solbi	33
Han Yeong	33
Kim Tae-woo	35
Choi Dae-sung	36–37, 42, 44, 50, 115
Kim Tae-hyeon	36–37
Choi Dae-chul	36–37
Min Kyung-hoon	36–38, 50
Sleepy	36–38, 43, 51, 63, 104, 113, 165, 183
Hong Seok-cheon	36–39, 122, 149, 183
Don Spike	38, 40–41, 44, 50, 53, 58
Hong Rok-gi	38, 48–49
Yoo Young-seok	38
Park Sang-myun	38
Lee So-yool	39, 48–49
Kim Gura	42, 117, 236–237
Kim Hee-chul (Super Junior)	43, 50
Yang Se-chan	43, 53, 55, 57, 72, 74, 91–93, 98–101, 110–111, 165, 171, 176, 182, 188, 193, 198–199, 209–210
Jang Su-won	43
Yoo Jae-hwan	43
DinDin	43, 58, 159, 165, 168, 171
Jung Joon-young	43–45, 52
iKon	46
Park Soo-bin (Cosmic Girls)	46
Kim Il-jung	46
Noh Sa-bong	46
Lee Seong-min	46
Ahn Moon-sook	46
Noh Sa-yeon	46, 71, 98, 112, 114, 167, 192, 207
Lee Ji-hye	47
Kim Ji-hyun	47, 100, 161, 164
Chae Ri-na	47, 100, 161, 164, 300
Boom	47, 49, 51, 53, 55, 57, 106
Tak Jae-hoon	48–49, 69–70, 76, 78, 80, 84, 87–88, 97, 129–130, 136–137, 139–141, 158, 164, 168–170, 172, 174, 177, 184, 186, 194–196, 198–201, 203–206, 208–209, 211–214, 216–217, 219–220, 222–231, 233, 235–237
Jung Jae-yoon	48–49
Ryu Pil-jong	48–49
Kim Jong-kook	48, 50–51, 104–107
Kang Ho-dong	48
Kim Young-chul	50, 168, 170, 173–174
Kim Soo-yong	52
Nam Chang-hee	52, 61–62, 115, 154, 180, 206–207, 222, 226, 298, 310, 316
Kim Sook	52, 78
Leeteuk (Super Junior)	53, 160, 271, 284
Sayuri Fujita	53–54, 61, 81–82, 89–90, 92, 104, 115–117
Bbaek Ga	57–58, 61–63, 68, 105, 127, 131 (along with his mother), 139, 167, 306
Dok2	58, 79
Sam Okyere	59–60, 68–71, 77 (along with his mother)
Jeong Jun-ha	69, 157, 161–162, 181, 197, 223, 225
Haha	74 (along with his mother), 91–92, 101, 110–111, 130–131, 144, 147, 176, 193, 207, 209–210, 226
Shorry J	80, 85, 207
Park Ji-young	94
Han Hyun-min	95
Soya	97, 298
Blackpink	97
Narsha	100
Kim Min-kyo	102, 104, 121
Hong Jin-young	81, 103–104
Lee Guk-joo	104, 202, 208, 303, 316
Kim Jung-nam	105, 112, 118–119, 127, 158
Kim Young-hee	110
Kim Wan-sun	112, 118–119
Cha Seung-won	112
Jang Dong-min	113, 120
Heo Kyung-hwan	113, 151, 159, 170, 172, 226, 279, 297
Lee Sung-min	115, 145–146, 166
David Lee McInnis	115, 150–151
Im Jun-hyeok	118
Jang Hong-je	118
Lee Joon-hyung	118
Byun Yo-han	120–121, 173
Kim Bo-sung	124–125, 133–134, 142–144, 146, 149, 153, 160, 179, 196–197, 203, 218–219
Kim Shin-young	125–126, 131, 133, 162
Go Myung-hwan	125
Im Ji-eun	125
Yoo Se-yoon	125–126, 158, 160, 162, 164, 169, 188
Shin Ji	125–127, 234, 299, 306
Jung Suk-yong	107, 114, 128–129, 132, 147–148, 163, 166, 172, 175, 198–200, 215, 217–219, 224, 229, 234, 247–248, 254, 269–270, 275
Kim Soo-mi	87–88, 129–130, 139–141, 193, 222, 289
Lee Moo-song	64, 131, 167
Tae Jin-ah	64, 73, 77, 90, 100, 102, 111–112, 114, 131, 167
Lee Sang-yoon	132, 189
Park Sung-woong	132, 272
Uhm Jung-hwa	132
Yoo Jae-suk	135
Lee Kwang-soo	135
Jeon So-min	135
Kim Kang-hyun	138
Shinhwa	138
Byul	144
Lee Dong-woo	144, 149, 155, 157–159, 176
Kim Kyung-sik	144, 149, 155, 157–159, 176
Paul Pogba	145 (along with his mother)
Kim Jae-young	145–146
Son Yeo-eun	145–146
Kim Hye-eun	145–146
Lim Hyun-seong	145–146
Kim Sung-kyun	145–146, 174
Kim Jong-soo	145–146, 190
Jo Woo-jin	146, 214
Park Kyung-lim	149
Lee Cheol-min	150
Lee Kye-in	150
Han Song-yi	150
Lee Soon-sil	150
Park Sung-kwang	151, 172, 272, 305
Kim Ji-ho	151, 172
Lee Jin-ho	154
Kim Eung-soo	155
Muzie	126, 158, 164
Song Jin-woo	158, 164
Kim Won-hyo	159, 172
Yesung (Super Junior)	160, 271, 284
Choi Siwon (Super Junior)	160
Kim Ryeowook (Super Junior)	160
Lee Donghae (Super Junior)	160, 254, 271, 284
Eunhyuk (Super Junior)	160, 227, 232, 254, 271, 284
Cho Kyu-hyun (Super Junior)	160, 227, 271, 284
Shindong (Super Junior)	160, 168–171, 175, 182, 186, 192, 201, 227, 232, 254, 266, 284
Park Jin-joo	161
Bobby Kim	161, 300
P.O (Block B)	162
Twice	162
Han Chae-young	166
Heo Sol-ji (EXID)	167
ITZY	168–169
Park Young-jin	172
DJ DOC	172
Hwang Chi-yeul	173–174
Kim Nam-gil	174
Lee Hanee	174
Jung Ju-ri	175
Jo Dal-hwan	178–179, 185, 189
Chan Sung Jung	179
Kim Hong-fa	180
Han Suk-kyu	180
Shin Dong-wook	180
Byun Woo-min	180
Jin Kyung	180
Ahn Hyo-seop	180
Jung Gi-sub	180
Jung Hee-tae	180
Jang Myung-gap	180
Heo Jae-ho	180
Soyou	181
Daniel Hicks	181
Jonathan Thona	181
Kim Yonja	181, 252, 257
Park Cho-rong (Apink)	182
Yoon Bo-mi (Apink)	182
Son Na-eun (Apink)	182
Kim Nam-joo (Apink)	182
Oh Ha-young (Apink)	182
Lee Kyu-ho	182, 189
Lee Ho-cheol	182, 189, 198, 204, 216, 218, 229
Han Sang-jin	183
Joo Sang-wook	183
Yoon Hee-seok	183
Kim Kyung-jin	184, 220
Kim Jun-hyun	185, 187
Yoon Park	187, 191
Kim Kang-hoon	188
Reddy	188
Stephanie Lee	188
Han Hye-yeon	188
Min Sung-wook	189
Shin Jae-ha	189
Kim Min-kyung	190
Young Tak	190–193
Nam Gyu-ri	196
Lee Hoon	196–197, 203, 231
Lee Yeon-bok	197
Ji Suk-jin	198-199, 209–210, 226
Hwang Je-sung	198-199
Lim Do-Hyung	199, 253
Jin Sung	200, 213
Brian Joo (Fly to the Sky)	201, 208
Hong Kyung-min	203, 281
Cha Tae-hyun	203, 238, 355
Kangnam	204-206, 270
Sandara Park	204, 216
Lee Sang-hwa	205-206
Joon Park	206
Lee Sedol	206
Kim Jang-hoon	206
Zizo	207
Kim Hee-sun	210-212
Kim Jun-ho	211, 219
Jessi	213, 231, 233
Lee Je-hoon	214
Hyun Joo-yup	214, 220–222, 268
Kim Seung-woo	215
Im Chae-moo	216
Ahn Jung-hwan	220-221
Park Chan-ho	221
Jang Gwang	225, 242, 284, 289
Lee Soon-jae	225
Jeon Seong-ae	225
Chang Yoon-hee	225
Kim Dae-hee	225
Eom Yong-su	227
Choi Kwang-je	229
Psy	231, 233
KCM	233, 240
Park Jeong-woo (Treasure)	233
Lee Joong-ok	234
Tae Hang-ho	234
Jung Young-joo	236
Hwang Seok-jeong	236, 239, 252
Eugene (S.E.S)	237
Um Ki-joon	237
Rain	240
Ciipher	240-241
Kim Se-jeong	241
Mir	241
Park Jun-gyu	242
Yoo Young-jae (B.A.P)	243, 245
Do Kyung-wan	245, 256–259, 270
Jang Yoon-jeong	252
Kim Jung-min	253
Oh Ah-rin	253
Ateez	256
Lee Jun-hyeok	258-259, 266
Seo Nam-yong	258-262, 266, 268, 271, 275
Jo Dong-hyuk	259
Gu Bon-gil	260
Kim Jung-hwan	260
Im Chang-jung	266
Bae Do-hwan	270, 278, 312
Yoon Gi-won	270, 278, 281
Lee Yi-kyung	272
Rhymer	272
Ahn Hyun-Mo	272
Jang Hyuk	281
Kang Kyung-Hun	281
Kim Young-ok	295
Jun Won-ju	295
Kang Jae-joon	276, 282, 286, 292, 296
Lee Dong-jun (actor)	299
Cho Hyun-young (Rainbow)	299
Jiny	300
Lee Min-kyung	300
Esther (Korean singer)	300
Kim Ji-min	300-301, 304–305, 310–311
Hwang Bo-ra	305
Jung Yi-rang	305
Kim Won-ho	159, 172, 305
Kim Guy-ri	311
Kim Min-kyu	323
Oh Man-seok	354
Ko Chang-seok	354
Yoo Jun-sang	354

== Ratings ==
- Red numbers are the highest ratings, blue number represents the lowest ratings.
- Ratings listed are the highest ratings for each episodes.

=== 2016 ===
List of ratings in 2016 (Episode 1–18)

Ep. #	Date	TNmS Ratings	Nielsen Korea
Ep. #	Date	Nationwide	
1	August 26	5.8%	6.0%
2	September 2	7.2%	7.2%
3	September 9	7.7%	8.6%
4	September 23	8.2%	10.2%
5	September 30	9.2%	10.9%
6	October 7	9.4%	10.8%
7	October 14	9.9%	11.4%
8	October 21	9.2%	10.3%
9	October 28	11.0%	11.8%
10	November 4	9.8%	10.0%
11	November 11	10.1%	11.0%
12	November 18	11.4%	10.6%
13	November 25	8.3%	10.3%
14	December 2	9.3%	9.7%
15	December 9	10.2%	10.0%
16	December 16	8.9%	9.8%
17	December 23	10.1%	11.6%
18	December 30	8.0%	9.3%

=== 2017 ===
List of ratings in 2017 (Episode 19–68)

Ep. #	Date	TNmS Ratings	Nielsen Korea
Ep. #	Date	Nationwide	
19	January 6	10.2%	11.9%
20	January 13	10.3%	12.0%
21	January 20	10.2%	11.5%
22	January 27	7.6%	8.0%
23	February 3	10.6%	12.6%
24	February 10	12.7%	15.0%
25	February 17	11.3%	13.2%
26	February 24	10.9%	13.2%
27	March 3	10.8%	13.0%
28	March 17	9.8%	10.7%
29	March 24	8.3%	9.1%
30	March 31	8.3%	8.8%
31	April 7	9.5%	10.0%
32	April 16	18.1%	18.9%
33	April 23	15.4%	18.5%
34	April 30	15.8%	18.3%
35	May 7	16.9%	21.3%
36	May 14	18.2%	18.3%
37	May 21	15.5%	18.6%
38	May 28	18.2%	21.2%
39	June 4	18.1%	21.5%
40	June 11	18.6%	19.7%
41	June 18	16.8%	19.3%
42	June 25	17.7%	18.9%
43	July 2	16.9%	18.6%
44	July 9	16.3%	16.6%
45	July 16	16.3%	17.1%
46	July 23	17.0%	17.7%
47	July 30	15.9%	16.1%
48	August 6	18.7%	19.2%
49	August 13	17.4%	18.6%
50	August 20	17.0%	19.2%
51	August 27	16.8%	17.2%
52	September 3	15.0%	16.3%
53	September 10	16.8%	17.7%
54	September 17	17.9%	19.8%
55	September 24	18.6%	19.6%
56	October 1	17.3%	20.1%
57	October 8	18.1%	20.8%
58	October 15	19.2%	20.9%
59	October 22	21.6%	22.9%
60	October 29	20.5%	21.2%
61	November 5	18.7%	19.1%
62	November 12	18.1%	19.2%
63	November 19	18.2%	19.7%
64	November 26	19.4%	16.1%
65	December 3	19.5%	20.0%
66	December 10	20.0%	20.7%
67	December 17	18.3%	18.8%
68	December 24	20.5%	21.1%

=== 2018 ===
List of ratings in 2018 (Episode 69–119)
My Little Old Boy : South Korea viewers per episode (millions)

Episodes (2018)	Episode number																
Episodes (2018)	1	2	3	4	5	6	7	8	9	10	11	12	13	14	15	16	17
Ep.69-85	3.938	3.797	3.988	4.099	3.935	3.952	2.165	4.022	3.449	3.315	2.615	3.196	3.337	3.902	3.574	3.645	3.568
Ep.86-102	3.497	4.120	3.835	4.120	3.862	4.074	3.524	3.710	4.270	4.008	4.020	3.761	3.509	3.523	4.036	2.442	4.121
Ep.103-119	3.017	3.336	2.792	3.139	3.206	3.320	3.774	3.311	3.451	3.518	3.744	3.964	3.843	4.021	4.452	4.648	5.314

Source: Audience measurement performed nationwide by Nielsen Media Research. (Note: The number of viewers was released on Nielsen starting January 2018.)

Average TV viewership ratings
Ep. #	Date	TNmS Ratings	Nielsen Korea
Ep. #	Date	Nationwide	
69	January 7	17.8%	19.7%
70	January 14	17.3%	19.0%
71	January 21	18.9%	20.4%
72	January 28	18.5%	20.9%
73	February 4	18.5%	19.1%
74	February 11	18.7%	20.4%
75 (Note: Due to PyeongChang Winter Olympic, the air time of Part 1 changes to 22.55 and air time of Part 2 changes to 23.25.)	February 18	10.0%	10.1%
76	February 25	16.7%	19.1%
77	March 4	15.8%	17.9%
78	March 11	15.8%	16.2%
79	March 18	11.8%	14.2%
80 (Note: Due to closing ceremony of PyeongChang Winter Olympic, the air time of Part 1 changes to 22.00 and air time of Part 2 changes to 22.55.)	March 25	17.2%	17.7%
81	April 1	19.0%	18.2%
82	April 8	18.1%	20.4%
83	April 15	20.0%	19.9%
84	April 22	17.9%	20.0%
85	April 29	18.7%	20.0%
86	May 6	16.5%	18.1%
87	May 13	20.5%	21.9%
88	May 20	22.0%	19.6%
89	May 27	17.2%	21.1%
90	June 3	21.2%	20.9%
91	June 10	20.6%	20.3%
92	June 17	20.2%	19.3%
93	June 24	22.8%	20.8%
94	July 1	22.8%	21.7%
95	July 8	20.3%	21.0%
96	July 15	20.1%	20.8%
97	July 22	20.1%	18.8%
98	July 29	18.5%	18.0%
99	August 5	17.4%	17.7%
100	August 12	18.6%	20.0%
101 (Note: Due to the broadcasting of the 2018 Asian Games coverage of sports including swimming, shooting, taekwondo, and fencing, the air time changes to 22:30.)	August 19	11.5%	12.1%
102 (Note: Episode was pushed back a week due to the live coverage of the 2018 Asian Games.)	September 2	20.0%	21.7%
103	September 9	N/R	16.1%
104	September 16	N/R	18.4%
105	September 23	N/R	14.0%
106	September 30	N/R	16.2%
107	October 7	N/R	17.3%
108	October 14	N/R	17.4%
109	October 21	N/R	21.0%
110	October 28	N/R	17.8%
111	November 4	N/R	18.2%
112	November 11	N/R	19.9%
113	November 18	N/R	20.5%
114	November 25	N/R	22.0%
115	December 2	N/R	20.7%
116	December 9	N/R	21.6%
117	December 16	N/R	23.2%
118	December 23	N/R	24.0%
119	December 30	N/R	27.5%

=== 2019 ===
List of ratings in 2019 (Episode 120–170)
My Little Old Boy : South Korea viewers per episode (millions)

Episodes (2019)	Episode number																
Episodes (2019)	1	2	3	4	5	6	7	8	9	10	11	12	13	14	15	16	17
Ep.120-136	4.286	4.235	3.668	4.525	3.862	4.254	4.083	4.310	4.138	4.900	4.258	4.028	4.494	4.421	3.955	3.773	4.051
Ep.137-153	3.728	3.697	3.837	3.494	3.926	3.880	3.587	3.803	3.462	3.595	3.536	3.700	3.574	3.066	3.005	2.801	3.210
Ep.154-170	3.054	3.054	3.436	3.079	3.015	2.661	2.570	2.968	2.764	3.353	3.175	3.239	3.347	2.692	2.369	2.060	2.207

Source: Audience measurement performed nationwide by Nielsen Media Research.

Average TV viewership ratings
Ep. #	Date	Nielsen Korea
Ep. #	Date	Nationwide
120	January 6	22.6%
121	January 13	22.3%
122	January 20	18.5%
123	January 27	22.8%
124	February 3	20.7%
125	February 10	20.6%
126	February 17	20.4%
127	February 24	21.4%
128	March 3	21.1%
129	March 10	25.5%
130	March 16	21.5%
131	March 24	21.1%
132	March 31	23.1%
133	April 7	24.0%
134	April 14	20.2%
135	April 21	20.6%
136	April 28	23.5%
137	May 5	21.3%
138	May 12	20.7%
139	May 19	21.3%
140	May 26	20.4%
141	June 2	22.1%
142	June 9	21.3%
143	June 16	19.5%
144	June 23	21.7%
145	June 30	19.7%
146	July 7	19.6%
147	July 14	19.4%
148	July 21	20.1%
149	July 28	20.2%
150	August 4	16.5%
151	August 11	17.7%
152	August 18	16.2%
153	August 25	18.1%
154	September 1	17.7%
155	September 8	19.1%
156	September 15	19.6%
157	September 22	17.3%
158	September 29	17.5%
159	October 6	15.0%
160	October 13	15.4%
161	October 20	17.1%
162	October 27	15.6%
163	November 3	19.1%
164	November 10	17.7%
165	November 24	18.7%
166	December 1	19.1%
167	December 8	15.1%
168	December 15	14.3%
169	December 22	12.2%
170	December 29	12.3%

=== 2020 ===
List of ratings in 2020 (Episode 171–222)
My Little Old Boy : South Korea viewers per episode (millions)

Episodes (2020)	Episode number												
Episodes (2020)	1	2	3	4	5	6	7	8	9	10	11	12	13
Ep.171-183	2.318	2.377	2.415	1.924	1.962	2.268	2.056	2.958	2.797	2.741	2.868	2.351	2.320
Ep.184-196	3.112	2.552	2.450	2.449	2.527	2.681	2.953	3.040	2.839	3.065	2.822	2.713	2.991
Ep.197-209	2.416	2.718	2.662	2.706	3.188	2.266	2.887	3.143	2.940	2.853	2.431	2.761	2.730
Ep.210-222	3.186	2.468	3.055	2.244	2.404	2.317	2.505	3.010	2.769	2.733	2.733	2.651	3.167

Source: Audience measurement performed nationwide by Nielsen Media Research.

Average TV viewership ratings
Ep. #	Date	Nielsen Korea
Ep. #	Date	Nationwide
171	January 5	13.8%
172	January 12	12.9%
173	January 19	12.9%
174	January 26	9.8%
175	February 2	11.1%
176	February 9	11.8%
177	February 16	11.5%
178	February 23	15.5%
179	March 1	15.3%
180	March 8	14.5%
181	March 15	15.0%
182	March 22	12.4%
183	March 29	12.6%
184	April 5	16.4%
185	April 12	13.4%
186	April 19	13.3%
187	April 26	13.8%
188	May 3	13.6%
189	May 10	13.8%
190	May 17	16.0%
191	May 24	17.1%
192	May 31	15.9%
193	June 7	16.8%
194	June 14	15.4%
195	June 21	15.6%
196	June 28	16.4%
197	July 5	13.1%
198	July 12	14.7%
199	July 19	15.4%
200	July 26	14.8%
201	August 2	17.5%
202	August 9	13.4%
203	August 16	15.4%
204	August 23	16.5%
205	August 30	15.3%
206	September 6	15.7%
207	September 13	13.3%
208	September 20	15.4%
209	September 27	14.5%
210	October 4	17.6%
211	October 11	13.7%
212	October 18	17.1%
213	October 25	13.2%
214	November 1	14.0%
215	November 8	13.1%
216	November 15	14.1%
217	November 22	16.2%
218	November 29	16.3%
219	December 6	14.9%
220	December 13	15.2%
221	December 20	14.6%
222	December 27	17.8%

=== 2021 ===
List of ratings in 2021 (Episode 223–273)
My Little Old Boy : South Korea viewers per episode (millions)

Episodes (2021)	Episode number												
Episodes (2021)	1	2	3	4	5	6	7	8	9	10	11	12	13
223–235	2.934	2.640	3.212	2.897	3.086	2.544	2.725	2.984	2.718	2.706	2.318	2.931	2.244
236–248	2.218	2.750	3.122	2.842	2.718	2.970	2.682	2.421	2.562	2.623	2.676	2.336	2.462
249–261	2.584	2.715	2.622	1.556	1.591	2.371	2.386	2.303	2.236	2.554	1.849	2.172	2.090
262–273	2.236	2.291	2.096	2.449	2.402	2.268	2.208	2.224	2.444	2.440	2.632	2.323	–

Source: Audience measurement performed nationwide by Nielsen Media Research.

Average TV viewership ratings
Ep.	Original broadcast date	Nielsen Korea		TNmS
Ep.	Original broadcast date	Nationwide	Seoul	Nationwide
223	January 3	17.3%	17.8%	12.8%
224	January 10	15.4%	16.8%	12.3%
225	January 17	17.6%	18.5%	14.6%
226	January 24	16.4%	17.4%	13.8%
227	January 31	17.0%	18.2%	14.4%
228	February 7	13.4%	13.7%	11.6%
229	February 14	14.7%	15.0%	13.5%
230	February 21	16.4%	17.9%	12.9%
231	February 28	15.2%	15.7%	12.8%
232	March 7	16.4%	17.3%	13.7%
233	March 14	13.7%	14.7%	11.9%
234	March 21	15.8%	16.2%	13.2%
235	March 28	13.9%	14.4%	11.8%
236	April 4	12.7%	12.6%	12.7%
237	April 11	15.1%	15.6%	12.6%
238	April 18	16.6%	17.4%	14.1%
239	April 25	16.2%	17.1%	13.8%
240	May 2	15.5%	15.7%	13.1%
241	May 9	16.1%	16.9%	14.4%
242	May 16	15.5%	16.3%	14.6%
243	May 23	14.0%	13.9%	12.9%
244	May 30	14.6%	15.4%	14.6%
245	June 6	16.0%	16.7%	13.5%
246	June 13	14.0%	14.5%	13.1%
247	June 20	13.2%	13.6%	11.8%
248	June 27	13.7%	14.1%	11.1%
249	July 4	14.4%	15.0%	12.5%
250	July 11	14.3%	14.8%	12.6%
251	July 18	14.0%	15.1%	13.1%
252	August 1	8.3%	9.4%	—N/a
253	August 8	9.2%	9.9%	7.8%
254	August 15	13.3%	13.9%	11.7%
255	August 22	13.4%	14.1%	11.6%
256	August 29	13.3%	13.4%	11.8%
257	September 5	12.1%	11.2%	10.9%
258	September 12	14.6%	15.1%	11.6%
259	September 19	10.3%	10.7%	9.1%
260	September 26	11.5%	11.6%	10.5%
261	October 3	11.4%	11.5%	10.6%
262	October 10	12.2%	12.3%	10.9%
263	October 17	13.1%		10.6%
264	October 24	11.7%	11.3%	10.1%
265	October 31	13.1%	13.3%	11.8%
266	November 7	13.3%	12.9%	12.1%
267	November 14	13.2%		11.6%
268	November 21	12.5%	12.7%	11.4%
269	November 28	12.5%	12.9%	10.3%
270	December 5	13.5%	13.2%	11.9%
271	December 12	13.5%	14.1%	10.8%
272	December 19	14.5%	15.0%	12.7%
273	December 26	12.2%	12.1%	11.3%

=== 2022 ===
List of ratings in 2022 (Episode 274 –)
My Little Old Boy : South Korea viewers per episode (millions)

Episodes (2022)	Episode number												
Episodes (2022)	1	2	3	4	5	6	7	8	9	10	11	12	13
274–285	2.609	2.691	2.569	2.785	2.770	2.698	2.684	2.557	2.193	2.819	2.260	2.475	2.090
286–298	2.206	2.696	2.311	2.078	2.242	2.348	2.444	2.409	2.446	2.049	2.946	2.232	–
299–311	2.607	2.918	2.813	2.752	2.685	2.636	2.919	TBD	TBD	TBD	TBD	TBD	TBD
312–324	TBD	TBD	TBD	TBD	TBD	TBD	TBD	TBD	TBD	TBD	TBD	TBD	TBD

Source: Audience measurement performed nationwide by Nielsen Media Research.

Average TV viewership ratings
Ep.	Original broadcast date	Nielsen Korea		TNmS
Ep.	Original broadcast date	Nationwide	Seoul	Nationwide
274	January 2	14.0%	14.5%	11.5%
275	January 9	14.4%	14.8%	11.8%
276	January 16	13.4%	13.9%	10.9%
277	January 23	14.7%	15.2%	12.7%
278	January 30	13.8%	14.0%	10.9%
279	February 6	14.5%	14.9%	11.2%
280	February 20	13.7%	14.1%	13.4%
281	February 27	14.0%	14.5%	12.0%
282	March 6	12.3%	13.1%	11.0%
283	March 13	15.5%	15.9%	14.1%
284	March 20	12.2%	12.4%	11.9%
285	March 27	13.1%	13.7%	12.4%
286	April 3	10.9%	11.2%	11.3%
287	April 10	12.0%	12.5%	—N/a
288	April 17	15.0%	15.8%	12.6%
289	April 24	12.9%	13.8%	12.2%
290	May 1	11.8%	11.9%	10.3%
291	May 8	12.7%	13.3%	10.8%
292	May 15	13.0%	12.8%	11.7%
293	May 22	13.8%	14.3%	11.7%
294	May 29	13.8%	14.2%	11.9%
295	June 5	13.8%	13.6%	12.9%
296	June 12	11.8%	12.2%	10.6%
297	June 19	16.7%	17.5%	13.5%
298	June 26	12.4%	12.8%	11.6%
299	July 3	14.0%	15.2%	13.8%
300	July 10	15.5%	16.0%	12.6%
301	July 17	14.9%	15.3%	13.8%
302	July 24	15.0%	15.2%	13.3%
303	July 31	14.4%	15.4%	13.1%
304	August 7	14.0%	14.7%	—N/a
305	August 14	15.9%	16.3%	13.9%
306	August 21	15.2%	15.7%	
307	August 28	13.0%	13.3%	
308	September 4	14.0%	13.9%	
309	September 11	13.0%	12.6%	
310	September 18	13.3%	13.6%	
311	September 25	13.3%	12.9%	
312	October 2	13.0%	13.2%	
313	October 9	13.1%	13.2%	
314	October 16	14.7%	15.5%	
315	October 23	14.3%	15.0%	
316	November 6	13.7%	14.5%	
317	November 13	12.4%	13.0%	
318	November 20	14.9%	15.5%	
319	November 27	11.0%	11.2%	
320	December 4	11.4%	11.8%	
321	December 11	12.2%	12.1%	
322	December 18	11.6%	11.7%	
323	December 25	12.5%	13.2%	

== Awards and nominations ==
Name of the award ceremony, year presented, category, nominee(s) of the award, and the result of the nomination
Award ceremony	Year	Category	Recipients	Result	Ref.
Advertiser's Good Program Award	2017	Good Program	My Little Old Boy	Won	
Baeksang Arts Awards	2017	Best Entertainment Program	My Little Old Boy	Won	
Baeksang Arts Awards	2017	Best Variety Performer – Male	Park Soo-hong	Nominated	
Baeksang Arts Awards	2018	Best Variety Performer – Male	Lee Sang-min	Nominated	
Korean Broadcasting Awards	2017	Entertainment	My Little Old Boy	Won	
Korean Producer Awards	2017	Entertainment Category Award	My Little Old Boy	Won	
SBS Entertainment Awards	2016	Dirty Award	Tony An	Won	
SBS Entertainment Awards	2016	Excellence Award in Variety Show	Seo Jang-hoon	Won	
SBS Entertainment Awards	2016	Grand Prize (Daesang)	Shin Dong-yup	Won	
SBS Entertainment Awards	2016	PD Award	Park Soo-hong	Won	
SBS Entertainment Awards	2016	Program of the Year (Variety)	My Little Old Boy	Won	
SBS Entertainment Awards	2016	Scriptwriter of the Year	Yook So-young	Won	
SBS Entertainment Awards	2016	Top Excellence Award in Talk Show	Kim Gun-mo	Won	
SBS Entertainment Awards	2016	Turnabout Award	Park Soo-hong	Won	
SBS Entertainment Awards	2016	Excellence Award in Talk Show	Tony An	Nominated	
SBS Entertainment Awards	2016	Top Excellence Award in Talk Show	Han Hye-jin	Nominated	
SBS Entertainment Awards	2016	Top Excellence Award in Talk Show	Park Soo-hong	Nominated	
SBS Entertainment Awards	2017	Entertainment Scene Stealer Award	Yoon Jung-soo	Won	
SBS Entertainment Awards	2017	Excellence Award in Show/Talk Category	Tony An	Won	
SBS Entertainment Awards	2017	Grand Prize (Daesang)	Lee Sun-mi, Ji In-sook, Lee Ok-jin, Im Yeo-soon	Won	
SBS Entertainment Awards	2017	Program of the Year (Entertainment)	My Little Old Boy	Won	
SBS Entertainment Awards	2017	Rookie Award in Show/Talk Category	Lee Sang-min	Won	
SBS Entertainment Awards	2017	Top Excellence Award in Show/Talk Category	Seo Jang-hoon	Won	
SBS Entertainment Awards	2017	Best Couple Award	Park Soo-hong & Yoon Jung-soo	Nominated	
SBS Entertainment Awards	2017	Entertainment Scene Stealer Award	Don Spike	Nominated	
SBS Entertainment Awards	2017	Entertainment Scene Stealer Award	Kim Jong-min & Bbaek Ga	Nominated	
SBS Entertainment Awards	2017	Excellence Award in Show/Talk Category	Seo Jang-hoon	Nominated	
SBS Entertainment Awards	2018	Best Couple Award	Kim Jong-kook & Hong Jin-young	Won	
SBS Entertainment Awards	2018	Best Entertainer Award	Im Won-hee	Won	
SBS Entertainment Awards	2018	Producer's Award	Kim Jong-kook	Won	
SBS Entertainment Awards	2018	Excellence Award (Talk/Show)	Lee Sang-min	Won	
SBS Entertainment Awards	2018	Hot Star of the Year	Bae Jung-nam	Won	
SBS Entertainment Awards	2018	Program of the Year Award (Variety)	My Little Old Boy	Won	
SBS Entertainment Awards	2018	Scene Stealer Award	Seungri	Won	
SBS Entertainment Awards	2018	Best Couple Award	Seo Jang-hoon & Gim Gu-ra	Nominated	
SBS Entertainment Awards	2018	Best Entertainer Award	Hong Jin-young	Nominated	
SBS Entertainment Awards	2018	Best Entertainer Award	Bae Jung-nam	Nominated	
SBS Entertainment Awards	2018	Best Entertainer Award	Seungri	Nominated	
SBS Entertainment Awards	2019	Best Couple Award	Lee Sang-min & Tak Jae-hoon	Won	
SBS Entertainment Awards	2019	Excellence Award in Reality Category	Kim Hee-chul	Won	
SBS Entertainment Awards	2019	Top Excellence Award in Reality Category	Hong Jin-young	Won	
SBS Entertainment Awards	2019	Top Excellence Award in Reality Category	Kim Jong-kook	Won	
SBS Entertainment Awards	2020	Best Couple Award	Im Won-hee & Jung Suk-yong	Won	
SBS Entertainment Awards	2020	Grand Prize (Daesang)	Kim Jong-kook	Won	
SBS Entertainment Awards	2020	Rookie Award	Oh Min-suk	Won	
SBS Entertainment Awards	2020	Scriptwriter of the Year	Yook So-young	Won	
SBS Entertainment Awards	2020	Special Award: Lifetime Achievement Award	Seo Jang-hoon	Won	
SBS Entertainment Awards	2020	Special Award: Scene Stealer Award	Tak Jae-hoon	Won	
SBS Entertainment Awards	2020	Top Excellence Award in Reality Category	Lee Sang-min	Won	
SBS Entertainment Awards	2020	Top Excellence in Programming Award	My Little Old Boy	Won	
SBS Entertainment Awards	2020	Grand Prize (Daesang)	Seo Jang-hoon	Nominated	
SBS Entertainment Awards	2021	Entertainer of the Year Award	Shin Dong-yup	Won	
SBS Entertainment Awards	2021	Entertainer of the Year Award	Seo Jang-hoon	Won	
SBS Entertainment Awards	2021	Entertainer of the Year Award	Lee Sang-min	Won	
SBS Entertainment Awards	2021	Entertainer of the Year Award	Kim Jong-kook	Won	
SBS Entertainment Awards	2021	Entertainer of the Year Award	Tak Jae-hoon	Won	
SBS Entertainment Awards	2021	Excellence Award in Talk/ Variety Category	Kim Joon-ho	Won	
SBS Entertainment Awards	2021	Excellence Award in Talk/ Variety Category	Im Won-hee	Won	
SBS Entertainment Awards	2021	Grand Prize (Daesang)	My Little Old Boy team (Note: Consisting of Shin Dong-yup, Seo Jang-hoon, Cho Hye-seon, Kim Sun-ja, Park Young-hye, Lee Sang-min, Tak Jae-hoon, Im Won-hee, Kim Joon-ho, Kim Jong-kook, Kim Hee-chul, Lee Tae-sung, Oh Min-suk, Park Goon, and Choi Jin-hyuk)	Won	
SBS Entertainment Awards	2021	Rookie Award in Reality Category	Park Goon	Won	
SBS Entertainment Awards	2021	Top Excellence in Reality Award	Tak Jae-hoon	Won	
SBS Entertainment Awards	2021	Best Couple Award	Kim Joon-ho & Lee Sang-min	Nominated	
