= GoCar =

GoCar may refer to:

- GoCar (carsharing), a carsharing program in Ireland
- GoCar Tours, a GPS guided rental scooter (motorcycle) tour company found in several countries
- GoCar, a ride-hailing service by the Indonesian company Gojek

== See also ==
- Go cart
