= Heo Kyung-hwan =

South Korean comedian (born 1981)

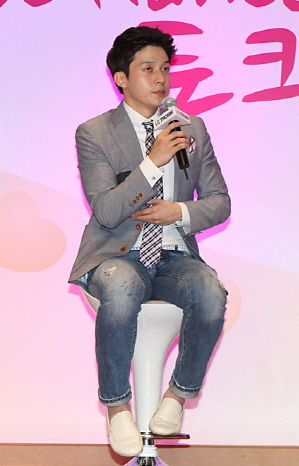
- Born: February 16, 1981 (age 45); Tongyeong, South Korea

Comedy career
- Years active: 2006–present
- Medium: Stand-up, television
- Genres: Observational, Sketch, Wit, Parody, Slapstick, Dramatic, Sitcom

Korean name
- Hangul: 허경환
- Hanja: 許卿煥
- RR: Heo Gyeonghwan
- MR: Hŏ Kyŏnghwan

Heo Kyung-hwan (Korean: 허경환; born February 16, 1981) is a South Korean comedian. He debuted as a comedian on Gag Concert, and is best known for his acts 'Four Men', 'Seoul Mate', and 'Dignity of a Beggar'. He is also known for the shows The Human Condition and Mamma Mia. It was revealed that he signed a contract with Cube Entertainment on 4 February 2016. In February 2022, Heo signed with Think Entertainment.

== Filmography ==
=== Television series ===
Year	Title	Notes
2009	Boys Over Flowers	Cameo (Episode 10)
2013	The Queen of Office	Cameo as Chinese restaurant deliveryman (Episode 1)
2016	Lucky Romance	Cameo

=== Television shows ===
Year	Show	Notes
2007–2013	Gag Concert	Cast member
2009	Crisis Escape No. 1	Special MC (Ep. 240)
2010–2011	Sponge	Fixed panelist for Sponge 0
2011	Romantic Take Care	Co-host
2011–2014	Happy Together 3	Host/G4 member (Ep. 226–357)
2012–2014	The Human Condition Season 1	Cast member (Pilot, Ep. 1–58)
2013–2014	Mamma Mia	Co-host with Park Mi-sun and Lee Young-ja
2014	I Am a Man	Co-host
2015	Please Take Care of My Refrigerator	Special MC (Ep. 58–59)
2015	Two Yoo Project Sugar Man	Co-host (Pilot)
2015–2016	Real Men	Manly Man Special
2015–2017	Duet Song Festival	Regular/fixed cast (Ep. 2–8, 31–47)
2016	With You	Cast member, paired with Oh Na-mi (Ep. 37–77)
2016	Please Take Care of My Refrigerator	Special MC (Ep. 62–63)
2016	King of Mask Singer	Panelist (Ep. 49–52, 55–60)
2016	Law of the Jungle	Ep. 220–224 at New Caledonia
2016	Battle Trip	Contestant with Park Sung-kwang (Ep. 31–32)
2017	Thinking About My Bias	Cast member
2018–2019	Salty Tour	Cast member (Episode 12–78)
2018–2019	4 Wheeled Restaurant (Season 2)	Cast member
2019	4 Wheeled Restaurant (Season 3)	Cast member
2019	Love Me Actually	Cast member (Episode 1–20)
2020	Yacht Expedition: The Beginning	Cast member
2020	Law of the Jungle	Cast member
2020–2021	Stars' Top Recipe at Fun-Staurant	Cast member
2021–present	Exercise Restaurant	Cast Member
2021	Chosun Panstar	Host
2021	Healing Mountain Lodge 2	Host
2022	We Are Family	Cast Member
2022	Mystery Duet	Panelist
2022	Round Table	Contestant; Chuseok Special
2022	Running Full Course	Cast Member; pilot program
2022–present	My Little Old Boy	Cast Member
2022–present	Battle Trip	Host; Season 2
2023	Hanfuli Karaoke	Host; with Kang Ye-seul - spin-off
2023	Korean Food Tray	Cast Member
2025	Muscle Farmers	Cast member
2026	Hangout with Yoo	Cast member

=== Web shows ===
Year	Title	Role	Notes	Ref.
2022	Shall We Go Together?	Host	with Lee Hye-sung	

== Awards and nominations ==
Year presented, name of the award ceremony, category, nominated work, and the result of the nomination
Year	Award	Category	Nominated work	Result	Ref.
2009	KBS Entertainment Awards	Best Newcomer Award		Won	
2012	KBS Entertainment Awards	Excellence Award		Won	
2016	16th MBC Entertainment Awards	Excellence Award in Variety (Male)	Real Men Season 2	Won	
2022	2022 SBS Entertainment Awards	Excellence Award in Talk and Reality Category	My Little Old Boy	Won	

=== State honors ===
Name of the organization, year presented, and the award given
Organization	Year	Award	Ref.
Seongdong Tax Office	2023	Minister Commendation from Seongdong Tax Office	
