= Reckless but Happy =

South Korean television show

- Promotional poster
- Hangul: 무확행
- RR: Muhwakhaeng
- MR: Muhwakhaeng
- Genre: Reality show Travel Documentary
- Presented by: Lee Sang-min; Seo Jang-hoon; Kim Jun-ho; Lee Sang-yeob
- Country of origin: South Korea
- Original language: Korean
- No. of seasons: 1
- No. of episodes: 6

Production
- Production locations: South Korea; Portugal; Myanmar
- Running time: 80 minutes

Original release
- Network: SBS
- Release: September 13 – October 25, 2018

Related
- My Little Old Boy; Dolsing Fourmen

Reckless but Happy (Korean: 무확행) is a South Korean variety show program on SBS starring Lee Sang-min, Seo Jang-hoon, Kim Jun-ho and Lee Sang-yeob. The show airs on SBS starting September 13, 2018 and ended on October 25, 2018. It was broadcast by SBS on Thursdays at 23:10 (KST).

== Synopsis ==
This is a show about 3 men who experienced divorce (Lee Sang-min, Seo Jang-hoon & Kim Jun-ho) and a man who experienced break-up (Lee Sang-yeob) travelling around the world to find their lost happiness after the end of their relationships.

== Airtime ==
Airdate	Broadcast Start Time (KST)	
September 13 – October 25, 2018	Part 1	Thursday at 11.10 pm
September 13 – October 25, 2018	Part 2	Thursday at 11:50 pm

== Episodes ==
Episode#	Broadcast Date	Destination	Guest(s)	Note(s)
1	September 13, 2018	Portugal	Tak Jae-hoon	
2	September 20, 2018	Portugal	Tak Jae-hoon	Kim Jun-ho joined the cast for the trip from this episode due to other schedules
3	October 4, 2018	Portugal	Tak Jae-hoon	
4	October 11, 2018	Myanmar	Tak Jae-hoon	
5	October 18, 2018	Myanmar	Tak Jae-hoon; Im Won-hee	
6	October 25, 2018	Myanmar	Tak Jae-hoon; Im Won-hee	Lee Sang-min left for Korea midway due to other schedules

== Ratings ==
=== 2018 ===
List of ratings (episode 1–6)
- Ratings listed below are the individual corner ratings of Reckless but Happy. (Note: Individual corner ratings do not include commercial time, which regular ratings include.)
- Note for TNmS ratings, the ones listed is the highest ratings amongst ratings for each episodes.
- In the ratings below, the highest rating for the show will be in red and the lowest rating for the show will be in blue each year.

2018		AGB Nielsen Ratings
Ep. #	Original Airdate	AGB Nielsen Ratings
1	September 13	2.9%
2	September 20	2.9%
3	October 4	2.9%
4	October 11	2.4%
5	October 18	3.4%
6	October 25	2.9%

== Awards and nominations ==
Year	Award	Category	Recipients	Result	Ref.
2018	12th SBS Entertainment Awards	Excellence Award in Show/Talk Category	Lee Sang-min	Won	
