= Wednesday Music Playlist =

South Korean television show

- Promotional poster
- Also known as: The Weekly Mixtape
- Hangul: 수요일은 음악프로
- Lit.: Wednesday Is Music Program
- RR: Suyoireun eumakpeuro
- MR: Suyoirŭn ŭmakp'ŭro
- Genre: Variety Show
- Starring: Jun Hyun-moo; Kim Jun-ho; John Park; Kim Jae-hwan
- Country of origin: South Korea
- Original language: Korean
- No. of seasons: 1
- No. of episodes: 10

Production
- Producer: Yoo Ho-jin
- Production location: South Korea
- Running time: 80 minutes

Original release
- Network: tvN
- Release: October 2 – December 4, 2019

Wednesday Music Playlist (Korean: 수요일은 음악프로) is a South Korean variety show program on tvN. It aired on tvN on Wednesdays at 23:00 (KST) from 2 October to 4 December 2019.

== Synopsis ==
This show is led by PD Yoo Ho-jin. The show feature the 4 cast members enjoying many forgotten and hidden masterpieces and unknown new songs through various entertainment formats such as talks, games and outdoor variety.

== Cast ==
- Jun Hyun-moo
- Kim Jun-ho
- John Park
- Kim Jae-hwan

== Episodes ==
=== 2019 ===
Ep.	Broadcast Date	Format	Guest(s)	Note(s)	Ref.
1	October 2	1. Cast members' introductions 2. Revelation of Cyworld; 3. Cyworld BGM quiz	Yoo Se-yoon, Kim Poong, Hwang Bo-ra	—	
2	October 9	Music trip at Seoul (Note: Cast members each customise their own trips and rate the trips)	—N/a	—	
3	October 16	Music trip at Seoul	—N/a	—	
4	October 23	Jun Hyun-moo's Sketchbook (Note: To perform on stage there's only one way: Win the Sketchbook game)	Car, the Garden, Greg Priester, George, No Brain, Lovelyz	—	
5	October 30	Wednesday Music Talk (Hidden Famous Songs Talk) (Note: The music stories from people who know music)	Noh Sa-yeon, Heo Ji-woong, Chang Ki-ha, Lee Chan-hyuk (AKMU)	—	
6	November 6	Autumn Music Camp (Note: Cast members must get familiar with a song related to the time and finish it to end work immediately, otherwise the cast members have to challenge a new song after an hour)	—N/a	—	
7	November 13	100 Songs Debate (Note: Listen to the songs and note the problematic lyrics that were sung out)	Baek Ji-young, Kim Jong-min (Koyote), Swings, Yoon Bo-mi (Apink)	—	
8	November 20	Wednesday Music Playlist Hoesik (Note: The real identity: Escape the karaoke room)	Hwang Bo-ra, Car, the Garden	—	
9	November 27	Winter Top 30 Songs	Tak Jae-hoon, Nam Chang-hee, Jo Se-ho, Oh My Girl (Hyojung, Seunghee)	—	
10	December 4	Goodbye Songs Compilation	Muzie, Urban Zakapa, Solji (EXID), Park Jae-jung	—	

== Ratings ==
- Ratings listed below are the individual corner ratings of Wednesday Music Playlist. (Note: Individual corner ratings do not include commercial time, which regular ratings include.)
- In the ratings below, the highest rating for the show will be in red and the lowest rating for the show will be in blue each year.

Ep. #	Original Airdate	AGB Nielsen Ratings Nationwide
1	October 2, 2019	1.037%
2	October 9, 2019	0.731%
3	October 16, 2019	0.622%
4	October 23, 2019	0.720%
5	October 30, 2019	1.367%
6	November 6, 2019	0.695%
7	November 13, 2019	1.006%
8	November 20, 2019	0.740%
9	November 27, 2019	1.341%
10	December 4, 2019	0.717%
