= Come Back Home (film) =

2022 South Korean comedy film

- Release poster
- Hangul: 컴백홈
- RR: Keombaekhom
- MR: K'ŏmbaekhom
- Directed by: Lee Yeon-woo
- Written by: Jang Yu-jeong; Heo Sung-hye
- Starring: Ra Mi-ran; Song Sae-byeok; Lee Beom-soo
- Production companies: Wise Wolf; Joy & Cinema
- Distributed by: JNC Media Group
- Release date: October 5, 2022
- Country: South Korea
- Language: Korean
- Box office: est. US$349,623

Come Back Home (Korean: 컴백홈; RR: Keombaekhom) is a 2022 South Korean comedy film directed by Lee Yeon-woo, starring Ra Mi-ran, Song Sae-byeok and Lee Beom-soo. The film follows an unknown comedian named Ki-se (Song Sae-byeok), who lost everything and returned to his hometown after 15 years, becoming the boss of a large organization. It was released on October 5, 2022.

== Cast ==
- Ra Mi-ran as Yeong-shim
- Song Sae-byeok as Ki-se
- Lee Beom-soo as Kang Don
- Lee Geung-young as Pal-chul
- Oh Dae-hwan as Tae-kyu
- In Gyo-jin as Sang-man
- Lee Jun-hyeok as Pil-seong
- Kim Won-hae as Seong-bong
- Lee Joong-ok as Jun Cheol

Special appearance

- Kim Jun-ho
- Kim Ji-min
- Kim Dae-hee

== Production ==
Principal photography began on April 11, 2021 and filming was wrapped up on June 30, 2021.

== Release ==
The film originally scheduled to release on September 21 was released on October 5, 2022.

== Reception ==
Kang Nae-ri writing for YTN praised the performances of ensemble and stated, "It seems that such a dense story composition and a story that evokes sympathy has captured the actors as well." Concluding Kang opined, "The movie Come Back Home, full of laughter and emotion, is suitable for autumn."
