= Kim Saeng-min =

South Korean entertainer (born 1973)

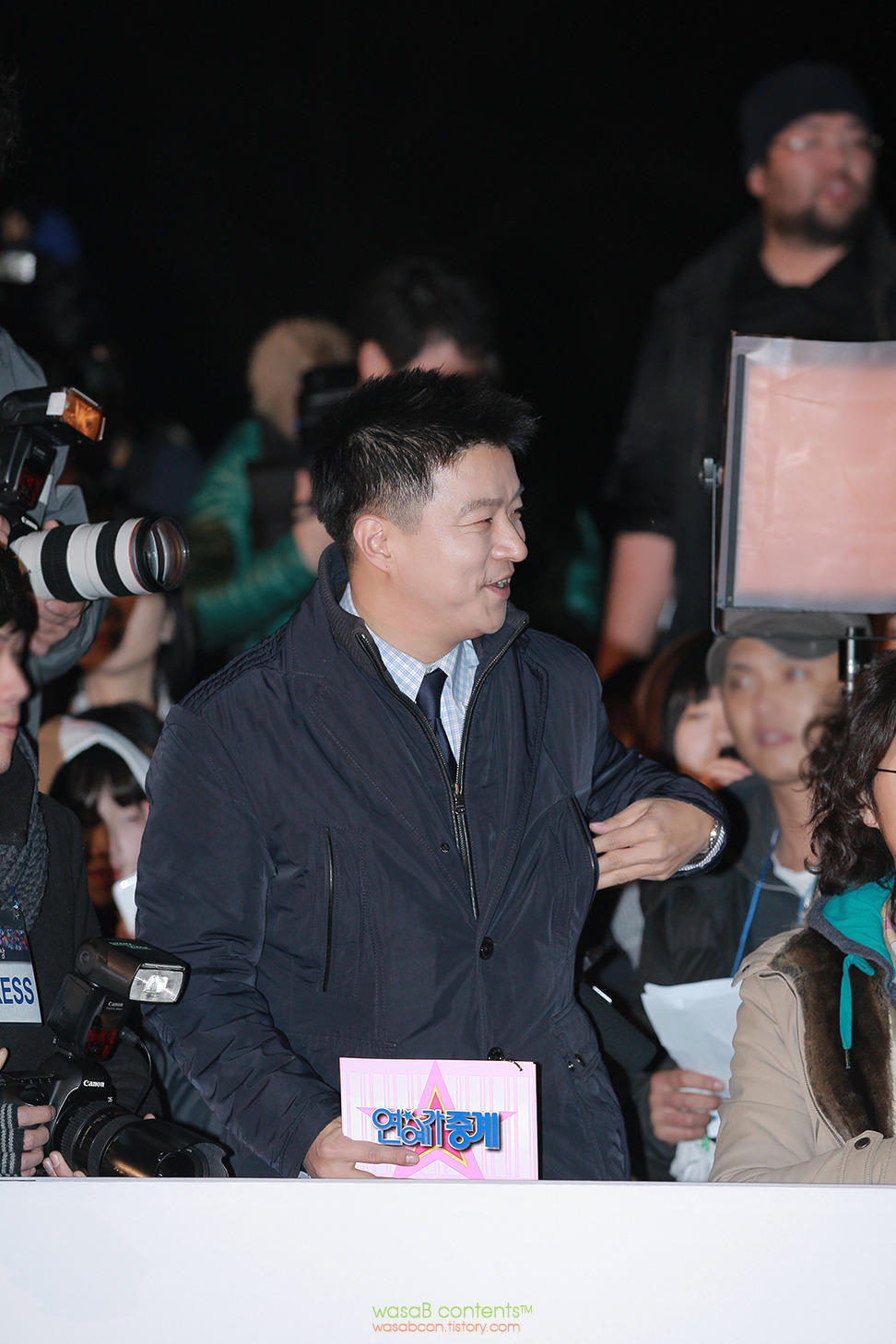
- Born: June 2, 1973 (age 52); Seoul, South Korea
- Occupation(s): television presenter, comedian
- Years active: 1992-present
- Agent: SM C&C (2017-present)

Korean name
- Hangul: 김생민
- Hanja: 金生珉
- RR: Gim Saengmin
- MR: Kim Saengmin

Kim Saeng-min (born June 2, 1973) is a South Korean television presenter and comedian. He is well known for a presenter on the TV show Go! Video Travel, TV Animal Farm and Entertainment Weekly

== Filmography ==
=== Variety Programs ===
Year	Title	Network	Note
1997–2018	Entertainment Weekly	KBS2	Host
1993–2018	Let's Go! Video Travel	MBC	Cast member
2001–18	TV Animal Farm	SBS	Cast member
2015–18	One Point of Common Sense	YTN	Cast member
2017–18	Kim Saeng-min's Receipts	KBS2	Host
2017–18	Salty Tour	TvN	Cast member (Eps 1–18)
2018	Do You Want to Rest Today?	MBN	Cast member
2018	Omniscient Interfering View	MBC	Cast member (Eps 1–4)

== Awards and nominations ==
Year	Award	Category	Nominated work	Result	Ref
2016	Korean Popular Culture and Arts Awards	Minister of Culture, Sports and Tourism Commendation	—	Won	
