= Kim Jun-ho (comedian) =

South Korean comedian (born 1976)

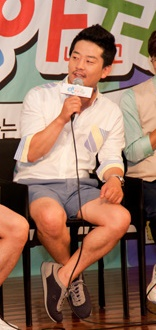
- Kim in June 2012
- Born: January 27, 1976 (age 50); Daejeon, South Korea
- Other name: Charlie Kim
- Spouses: Kim Eun-young (m. 2006; div. 2018); Kim Ji-min (m. 2025)

Comedy career
- Years active: 1996– present
- Medium: Stand-up, television
- Genres: Observational, Sketch, Wit, Parody, Slapstick, Dramatic

Korean name
- Hangul: 김준호
- Hanja: 金俊昊
- RR: Gim Junho
- MR: Kim Chunho
- Website: instagram.com/charliekimi/

Kim Jun-ho (Korean: 김준호; born January 27, 1976), also known as Charlie Kim, is a South Korean comedian, singer and television personality. He has starred in Gag Concert since 1999 and was a member of the variety show 2 Days & 1 Night from 2013 to 2019. He has also been the executive chairman of Busan International Comedy Festival since its conception in 2013.

Considered one of the best comedians in South Korea, Kim has won two Top Excellence awards and a Daesang Award at the KBS Entertainment Awards in both comedy and variety divisions. He is signed under JDB Entertainment.

== Early life ==
Kim was born in Daejeon, South Korea. His sister, Kim Mi-jin, is a TV show host. He graduated from Chungnam High School and majored in acting at Dankook University before dropping out.

Kim is greatly influenced by the famous comedian, Charlie Chaplin. For this reason he chose "Charlie Kim" as his English name.

== Career ==
Kim originally debuted under SBS's 5th class of comedians. He later joined KBS's Gag Concert in 1999 and is part of its 14th class. He was also a cast member for the first season of The Human Condition. He joined the 2 Days & 1 Night Season 3 lineup with Kim Joohyuk, Defconn and Jung Joon Young at the very end of 2013, gaining popularity as well as earning the nickname of "Mr. Devious" for his tendency to trick the other cast members. Kim is the chairman and head of the organizing committee for the Busan International Comedy Festival. He is a member of 같기도 (Gatgido), a comedic trio, which released an album with the same name in 2007.

Kim was the co-CEO and founder of CoKo Entertainment. However, in late 2014, it was discovered that his partner and co-CEO, Kim Woo Jung, had embezzled money from the company and had run away to the United States, causing the company debts to reach over millions of dollars. When it shut down from bankruptcy in January 2015, he and former comedians under CoKo company transferred to JD Bros, a company that is run by his friend, Kim Dae Hui. The comedians also cited that they will continue to support Kim Junho despite the incident.

== Personal life ==
On March 2, 2006, Kim married musical actress Kim Eun-young. The couple lived separately since 2007 after Kim Eun-young moved to the Philippines alone to start a business. On January 22, 2018, the comedian announced his divorce with his wife after 12 years of marriage.

On April 3, 2022, it was confirmed that Kim is in a relationship with comedian Kim Ji-min. The couple married on July 13, 2025, at the Grand InterContinental Seoul Parnas Hotel in Gangnam District.

On July 30, 2026, they announced that they were expecting a child on the way, just one year after getting married.

== Filmography ==
=== Film ===
Year	Title	Role	Notes	Ref.
2012	Love Clinique	Subway man	Cameo	
2012	Whatcha Wearin'?	Restaurant waiter	Cameo	
2012	Ice Age 4	Flynn	Voice role; Korean dub	
2013	The Gifted Hands	Marketing evangelist	Cameo	
2015	Enemies In-Law	MC	Cameo	
2022	Come Back Home	Himself	Cameo	
2023	Ungnami	Head of the detective team	Cameo	

=== Television series ===
Year	Title	Role	Notes	Ref.
2005–2006	Sweet Spy	Ka Oh-Ri		
2007	Air City	No Tae-Man		
2007–2008	New Heart	Sul Rae-Hyun		
2008	Night after Night	Lee Sang-Ho		
2010	Personal Taste	Jackpot expert	Cameo	
2013	Night Watch	Soo-Ji's ex-husband	TV movie	
2015	Late Night Cafeteria			
2017	Hit the Top	Passenger / Doctor	Cameo	

=== Television shows ===
Off-Air On-Air

Year	Title	Ref.
2007–2013	Amazing Outing	
1999–2019	Gag Concert	
2011–2013	Happy Together 3	
2012–2013	Qualifications of Men	
2012–2014	Quiz 4 Men	
2012–2014	The Human Condition	
2013–2019	2 Days & 1 Night – Season 3	
2015	Sense King	
2017–2019; 2019	Seoul Mate	
2018	Reckless but Happy	
2018	Living In One House	
2019	Wednesday Music Playlist	
2019; 2020	Salty Tour	
2020	Friendly Variety Show	
2020–present	My Little Old Boy	
2021	With The Famous Person	
2021	Genius Golf Club	
2021–present	Dolsing Fourmen	
2021–2022	Winner	
2022	Golf Battle: Birdie Buddies 4	

=== Web shows ===
Year	Title	Role	Notes	Ref.
2021	Golf Eve	Female golf team leader		
2021–2023	Star Golf Big League	Cast member		
2022	Collaborum Scene 2	Host		

=== Gag Concert segments ===
1999–2006

- Scream (1999)
- Morning of Savana (1999)
- Bongsunga School (2001)
- The Three Idiots (2002)
- What If (2002)
- Zigzag Song (2002)
- 9시 언저리 뉴스 (2003)
- Annals of X-Files (2004)
- 어우야 (2004)
- Low Life (2005)
- World News (2005)
- Home (2006)
- Zoo (2006)
- Uncle Jun Ho (2006)
- 호구와 울봉이 (2006)
- 고교천왕 (2006)

2007–2012

- 같기도 (2007)
- 지누주노 (2007)
- Gag Warrior 300 (2007)
- Odd Family (2007)
- 날아라! 변튜어디스 (2008)
- 뜬금개그 (2008)
- 가문이 영~꽝 (2008)
- Mobilize! Team Leader Kim (2008)
- Malicious Virus (2008)
- A Bitter Life (2009)
- 꽁트의 신 (2010)
- Bait (2010)
- Joa Family (2010)
- Mr. Kim Bong Tu (2010)
- Castle Gamsu (2011)
- Emergency Meeting (2011)
- Talk Show: The Dream (2012)
- Snap Martial Arts (2012)

2013–present

- The Animals (2013)
- Don't Give In (2013)
- Zombie Project (2013)
- Comedians' World (2013)
- Hidden Characters (2013)
- BBOOM Entertainment(2013)
- Rules of the Workplace (2013)
- Chicken High School (2014)
- Meditation (2015)
- Serious Kingdom (2015)
- Welcome Back Show (2016)
- Like A Family (2016)
- YOLO Inn (2017)
- Inner Voices (2017)
- Eunuchs (2018)

=== Music video appearances ===
Year	Title	Artist	Ref.
2016	"Shut Up" (feat. You Hee-yeol)	Unnies	
2017	"Aze Gag"	Mamamoo	

== Discography ==
- 2007 "같기도" (as part of Gatgido)
- 2011 Happy Singer Project
- 2013 "The Zombie" (Single) (Note: The Zombie (single) is a parody of the viral hit song, The Fox (What Does the Fox Say?) by Ylvis)
- 2017 "Good Zombie"

=== As featuring artist ===
- Mamamoo — "Aze Gag" (narration by Kim Joon-ho and Kim Dae-hee)

== Accolades ==
=== Awards and nominations ===
Name of the award ceremony, year presented, category, nominee of the award, and the result of the nomination
Award ceremony	Year	Category	Nominee / Work	Result	Ref.
Cable TV Broadcasting Awards	2013	TV Star Award	Kim Jun-ho	Won	
KBS Entertainment Awards	2005	Top Excellence Award, Male Comedian	Kim Jun-ho	Won	
KBS Entertainment Awards	2011	Top Excellence Award, Male Comedian	Kim Jun-ho	Won	
KBS Entertainment Awards	2013	Grand Prize (Daesang)	Gag Concert / The Human Condition / 2 Days & 1 Night Season 3	Won	
KBS Entertainment Awards	2016	Grand Prize (Daesang)	2 Days & 1 Night / Gag Concert	Nominated	
KBS Entertainment Awards	2018	Best Couple Award	Kim Jun-ho (with Kim Jong-min); 2 Days & 1 Night	Won	
KBS Entertainment Awards	2018	Grand Prize (Daesang)	2 Days & 1 Night / Gag Concert	Nominated	
Korea Broadcasting Awards	2009	Comedian Award	Gag Concert	Won	
Korean Comedy Hot Festival	2016	Shining Comedians in 2016 (Individual Category)	Kim Jun-ho	Won	
Korea Culture and Entertainment Awards	2013	Grand Prize (Entertainment Category)	Kim Jun-ho	Won	
Korea Culture and Entertainment Awards	2018	Grand Prize (Entertainment Category)	Kim Jun-ho	Won	
Korea Entertainment Arts Awards	2011	Comedian Award	Kim Jun-ho	Won	
Korea Film Festival	2010	Photogenic Award (Entertainment Category)	Kim Jun-ho	Won	
Korea PD Awards	2013	Best Performer Award (Comedian Category)	Kim Jun-ho	Won	
Korean Wave Culture Awards	2023	Grand Prize	Kim Jun-ho	Won	
SBS Entertainment Awards	2021	Excellence Award in Talk/ Variety Category	My Little Old Boy / Dolsing Fourmen	Won	
SBS Entertainment Awards	2021	Grand Prize (Daesang)	My Little Old Boy (Note: Grand Prize was presented to the whole cast of My Little Old Boy and was received alongside Shin Dong-yup, Seo Jang-hoon, Cho Hye-seon, Kim Sun-ja, Park Young-hye, Lee Sang-min, Tak Jae-hoon, Im Won-hee, Kim Jong-kook, Kim Hee-chul, Lee Tae-sung, Oh Min-suk, Park Goon, and Choi Jin-hyuk)	Won	
SBS Entertainment Awards	2021	Best Couple Award	Kim Jun-ho (with Lee Sang-min); My Little Old Boy	Nominated	
SBS Entertainment Awards	2022	2022 SBS's Son	My Little Old Boy / Dolsing Fourmen	Won	
SBS Entertainment Awards	2022	Top Excellence in Talk and Reality Award	My Little Old Boy / Dolsing Fourmen	Won	
SBS Entertainment Awards	2023	Golden Solo Award	Dolsing Fourmen (Note: Received with Tak Jae-hoon, Im Won-hee, and Lee Sang-min)	Won	
SBS Entertainment Awards	2023	Scene Stealer Award	My Little Old Boy / Dolsing Fourmen	Nominated	
SBS Entertainment Awards	2024	Honorary Employee Award	Kim Jun-ho	Won	

=== Honors ===
Name of country or organization, year given, and name of honor or award
Country or organization	Year	Honor / Award	Ref.
South Korea (Note: Honors are given at the Korean Popular Culture and Arts Awards, arranged by the Korea Creative Content Agency and hosted by the Ministry of Culture, Sports and Tourism.)	2013	Minister of Culture, Sports and Tourism Commendation	

=== Listicles ===
Name of publisher, year listed, name of listicle, and placement
Publisher	Year	List	Rank	Ref.
Forbes	2023	Korea Power Celebrity	21	

== Ambassadorial roles ==
- 2012 Korea Forest Service
- 2012 Tour de Korea
