= The Human Condition (TV series) =

South Korean television series

The Human Condition (Korean: 인간의 조건) is a South Korean variety show that started airing on November 17, 2012, on KBS2. The show currently broadcasts on Saturday evenings at 11:15 p.m. UTC+09. It features 6 top Korean actors being followed by cameras 24/7, showing new sides to them through the program, as they participate in social experiments about timely issues in South Korean modern society.

== Plot ==
"Living without Cellphones, Television and Internet" is the theme for the 4-episode pilot. Park Seong-ho, Kim Jun-ho, Jeong Tae-ho, Kim Jun-hyeon, Heo Kyung-hwan, and Yang Sang-guk are brought together in a dorm and tasked to live without their cellphones, television, and the internet for the next week. The cameras follow the 6 comedians closely to document their daily lives without the use of these modern conveniences. As they go through the experience they realize the impact of gadgets in the modern world.

== Season 1 ==
Episode	Theme	Guest Member	Appearances
01 – 05	Living without waste		Park Seong-ho's wife & son, Kim Jun-hyeon's parents, Yang Sang-guk's parents
06 – 10	Living without cars		Hong ingyu, Cho Yong-Jin (ALi)
11 – 14	Living without money		
15 – 17	Eating only local produce		
18 – 20	Finding real friends		
21 – 23	Living without water		
24 – 27	Living without electricity		2PM
28 – 31	The conditions for a holiday		Lee Joon (MBLAQ)
32 – 34	Living by the recommended daily calories		Huh Gak
35 – 37	Books in daily life	Kwanghee (ZE:A)	Park Gyu-ri & Kang Ji-young (Kara)
38 – 40	Woman special: Living without cellphone & trash		Son Dam-bi, Original Cast of Human Condition
41 – 43	Living only with the help of neighbors		Kim Yeong-hui's Mother, K.Will
44 – 47(Part 1)	Living without stress	Taecyeon (2PM)	Kim Heechul (Super Junior), Miss A
47(Part 2) - 48	1st Anniversary special: Analog trip		Kim Jun-ho's friend (Kang Beom Seok), Yang Sang-guk's friend (Son Seungmin)
49 – 51	Challenging zero heating costs	Lee Bong Won, Kim Kiri	
52 – 55 (Part 1)	Women's special: Living without chemical products	Park Eun-yeong, Park Jiseon	Cho Hangri, John Park
55 (Part 2) - 58	Living with minimum goods	Park Sung-kwang	Orange Caramel
59 – 61	Women's Special: Living without meat and flour	Kim Mingyeong, Chun Yi Seul	Myeong Hyeon Ji (Chef), Kim Tae-Hyun & Park Ga-Ram (DickPunks), Heo Kyung-hwan, Kwanghee & Minwoo (ZE:A)
62-64	Eco orientation (Change of Members)	Choiza (Dynamic Duo)	A Pink
65-67	Women's Special: Living only with part-time jobs	Park Eun-yeong, Choi Hee	
68-70	Living on low-sodium diet		Yang Dong-geun, Alex
71-72	Men & Women's Special: Volunteer farm work	Chun Yi Seul	
73-75	Overcoming skin and hair problems	Park Eun-ji, Bo-mi (A Pink)	Park Myung Soo, On Joo-Wan, Soyou & Bora (Sistar), Gong Chan & Baro (B1A4), Park Ki Ryang
76,78,79	Discovering 100 years of heritage		
77	Men & Women's Chuseok Special: The holiday condition		
80-82	Women's Special: Talent sharing	Jeong Da Eun	Jung Tae-ho, Park Sung-Kwang, Cho Hangri, Kim Junho, Koo Eunho, Jung Euichan, Kim Byungsuk, Hwang Paul, Kim Hoyoung
83-85	Traveling with mentors		
86-88	Women's Special: Living on a shoestring budget	Lizzy (After School), Han Chae-Ah	Super Junior's Eunhyuk & Ryeowook, Heo Anna, Kim Ji-hoon, Yoon Jong-shin, Muzie
89-91	Taking On traditionally female jobs		
92	Men & Women's Christmas Special		

== Season 2 ==
Episode	Theme	Guest Member	Guest
93-99	Living without the big 5		
99-100	Growing Close with Books		
101-102	Men and Woman, the Opposite Sex		
103-104	Our Country		

== Season 3 ==
Episode	Theme	Guest Member	Guest
105-129	Urban Farmer		

== Season 4 ==
Episode	Theme	Guest Member	Guest
129-142	Living With Senior Citizens		

== Cast ==
=== Season 1 - male Comedians/Singers/Announcer ===
- Park Seong-ho (Ep 1 – 58)
- Heo Kyung-hwan (Ep 1 – 58)
- Yang Sang-guk (Ep 1 – 58)
- Kim Jun-ho (Ep 1 – 92)
- Jeong Tae-ho (Ep 1 – 92)
- Kim Jun-hyeon (Ep 1 – 92)
- Gaeko (Dynamic Duo) (Ep 62 – 92)
- Jo U-jong (Ep 62 – 92)
- Kim Kiri (Ep 68 – 92)

=== Season 2 - male Actors/Singer/Model ===
- Kim Jae-Young
- Hyun Woo
- Yoon Sang-hyun
- Eun Ji-won
- Bong Tae-gyu
- Heo Tae-Hee

=== Female Comedians ===
- Kim Yeong-hee
- Kim Shin-young
- Shin Bora
- Kim Ji-min
- Kim Sook
- Park So Young

=== Season 3 - male Chefs/Singers/Comedians ===
- Jeong Tae-ho
- Yoon Jong-shin
- Choi Hyun-seok
- Jeong Chang-wook
- Park Sung-kwang
- Jo Jung-chi

=== Season 4 - Comedians/Singers/Former National Soccer Player ===
- Jo Se-ho
- Nam Changhee
- Ahn Junghwan
- Choi Yangrak
- Stephanie (singer, born October 1987)
