= Park Sung-kwang =

South Korean comedian (born 1981)

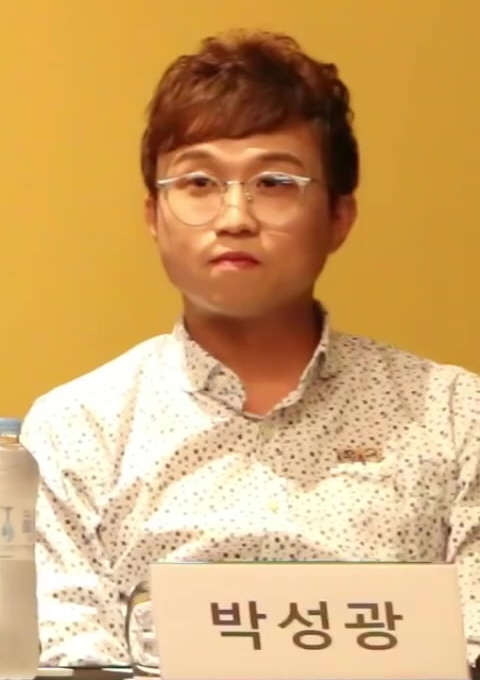
- Park in 2016
- Born: August 15, 1981 (age 45); Seoul, South Korea
- Years active: 2007–present
- Agent: SM C&C (2017–2023)
- Spouse: Lee Sol-yi

Korean name
- Hangul: 박성광
- Hanja: 朴聖光
- RR: Bak Seonggwang
- MR: Pak Sŏnggwang

Park Sung-kwang (Korean: 박성광; born August 15, 1981) is a comedian, film director, and rapper in the band Brave Guys. He currently performs in KBS's Gag Concert, where he made his entertainment debut as a comedian in 2007. He has owned a kimchi-business since 2011. He was previously signed under SNS Entertainment. He signed with SM C&C in 2018 and stayed with the agency until 2023.

== Education ==
Park graduated from Dong-ah Broadcasting College (동아방송대학), majoring in Film Arts.

== Debut ==
Park debuted on Gag Concert in the skit, "Concentrate on Debate" (집중토론) as the objector, in 2007. His other known skits include "Park VS Park", where he was the MC, and "Bongsunga School 2008" as Professor Ma and Park Ji-sun's boyfriend. In 2011, he debuted as a director with his short film, Curse, at the Seoul International Extreme-Short Image and Film Festival.

== Filmography ==
=== Films ===
Year	Title	Role	Notes/Ref.
2011	Curse	Director	Short film
2012	Never Ending Story	Matchmaking business manager	Cameo
2012	Nameless Gangster: Rules of the Time	Host/MC	
2013	Animals United	Billy	Korean dub
2017	슬프지 않아서 슬픈	Director	Short film
2023	Ungnami	Director	Comedy film

=== Television series ===
Year	Title	Network	Role	Notes
2011	Baby Faced Beauty	KBS2		Cameo
2011	Poseidon	KBS2	Kim Dae-sung	Supporting role
2011	High Kick: Revenge of the Short Legged	MBC		Special appearance
2012	Family	KBS2	Koong Sang-in	Extended cast
2013	Thunderstruck Stationery	Tooniverse	Himself	Supporting role
2016	Ready for Start - Vol. 1	NAVER TV Cast	Head of department for Yongbongtang	Special appearance
2016	Lucky Romance	MBC		Cameo
2016	Dr. Romantic	SBS		Special appearance

=== Variety shows ===
Year	Show	Network	Role	Notes/Ref.
2007–?	Gag Concert	KBS2	Cast member	
2011	Crisis Escape No. 1	KBS2	Special MC with Jeong Tae-ho	Episode 281
2012	Crisis Escape No. 1	KBS2	Special MC with Brave Guys members Shin Bo-ra, Yang Soon-il, and Jeong Tae-ho	Episode 340
2015	The Human Condition	KBS2	Cast member	Season 3: Urban Farmers
2015	Crisis Escape No. 1	KBS2	Special MC	Episodes 499–500
2016	Battle Trip	KBS2	Contestant with Heo Kyung-hwan	Episodes 31–32
2017–2018	Night Goblin	JTBC	Cast member	
2018	Food Diary	tvN	Cast member	Episodes 1–10
2018–2019	Omniscient Interfering View	MBC	Guest (with segment)	Episodes 13–52
2019	My Sibling's Lovers: Family Is Watching	E Channel	Cast	
2019	Hollywood Breakfast	tvN	Manager	Episodes 1–present
2019	Hogu's Romance/ Love Me Actually	MBC	Cast member	Episodes 1–20
2020	Same Bed, Different Dreams 2: You Are My Destiny	SBS	Cast member	Episode 144-present
2021	Gae Winner	KBS2	Cast	

== Discography ==
=== Brave Guys ===
Year	Title	Peak chart positions	Sales	Album
Year	Title	KOR	Sales	Album
2012	Brave Snow White	—	—	Snow White and the Huntsman Korean OST
2012	닥치고 패밀리 (Shut Up Family)	75	KOR (DL): 57,662+	Family OST
2012	기다려 그리고 준비해 (Wait And Get Ready)	5	KOR (DL): 980,231+	A to Z
2012	I 돈 Care (I Don't Care) (feat. PD Seo Su-min)	2	KOR (DL): 1,347,136+	A to Z
2012	봄 여름 여름 여름 (Spring Summer Summer Summer)	9	KOR (DL): 645,795+	A to Z
2012	멀어진다 (Drift Apart)	57	KOR (DL): 146,867+	A to Z
2012	자꾸만 (Again)	30	KOR (DL): 171,794+	A to Z
2012	할말은 한다 (Say What I Need to Say)	—	—	A to Z
2012	Party People	—	—	A to Z
2012	흔한 이별 (Typical Breakup)	—	—	A to Z
2012	2012	—	—	A to Z
2012	거짓말 (Lie) (feat. Airplane)	—	—	A to Z
"—" denotes releases that did not chart or were not released in that region.

=== Maheun Five ===
Year	Title	Peak chart positions	Sales	Album
2019	스물마흔살 (Twenty Forty Years Old)	—	—	—
2020	그댄 뭘 먹고 그렇게 예뻐 (Marry Me [Why You are So Beautiful])	—	—	—

== Awards and nominations ==
Year	Award	Category	Nominated work	Result
2003	Nate Gag Festival	1st place		Won
2004	코엑스 개그페스티벌	3rd place		Won
2008	KBS Entertainment Awards	Best Newcomer in Comedy – Male		Won
2011	Mnet 20's Choice Awards	5th Hot Funniest Guy		Won
2012	KBS Entertainment Awards	Top Excellence Award, Idea (Corner)	Brave Guys	Won
2015	23rd Korean Culture and Entertainment Awards	Comedian Award		Won
2018	18th MBC Entertainment Awards	Excellence Award in Variety	Omniscient Interfering View	Won
2018	18th MBC Entertainment Awards	Best Couple (with manager, Lim Song)	Omniscient Interfering View	Won
2020	14th SBS Entertainment Awards	Best Teamwork Award	Same Bed, Different Dreams 2: You Are My Destiny	Won
