= Kim Ji-min (comedian) =

South Korean comedian (born 1984)

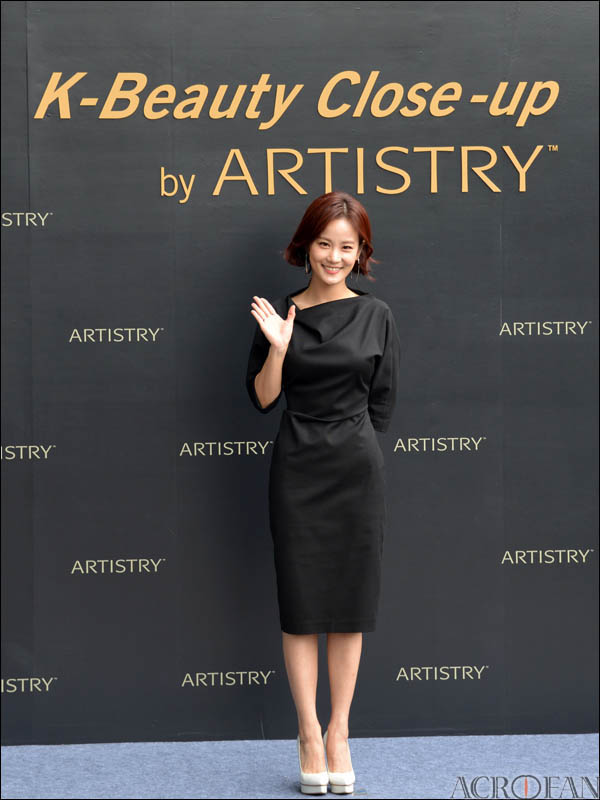
- Kim in 2015
- Born: November 30, 1984 (age 41); Donghae, Gangwon Province, South Korea
- Spouse: Kim Jun-ho (m. 2025)

Comedy career
- Years active: 2006– 2007; 2011–present
- Medium: Stand-up, Television
- Genres: Observational, Sketch, Wit, Parody, Slapstick, Dramatic

Korean name
- Hangul: 김지민
- Hanja: 金智珉
- RR: Gim Jimin
- MR: Kim Chimin

Kim Ji-min (Korean: 김지민; born November 30, 1984) is a South Korean comedian, television host, and actress. She debuted as a comedian on the sketch-comedy show Gag Concert in 2006. She is best known for her skits "Dignity of a Beggar," "Uncomfortable Truth," and "BBOOM Entertainment," as well as the variety shows Human Condition and Crisis Escape No. 1. In 2019, Kim departed Gag Concert to appear on Comedy Big League.

== Career ==
Kim Ji-min was born and raised in Donghae, Gangwon, South Korea. She has two older sisters and a younger brother. She graduated from Suwon Women's College with a degree in Cosmetology.

Kim Ji-min first made television appearance through an amateur comedy show, Gag Hunt, in 2006. She officially debuted on Gag Concert as a KBS 21st class comedian in 2006. She received the Best Newcomer (Female) award in the same year for her work in the skit "Lovers." After a period of hiatus, she returned to Gag Concert in 2012 with the skits "Uncomfortable Truth" and "Dignity of a Beggar" and was awarded the Excellence Award in Comedy at the KBS Entertainment Awards. In 2013, she received the KBS Top Excellence Award in Comedy for her continued work on Gag Concert. The following year, she was awarded the Top Excellence Award in the Variety for her work in the shows Crisis Escape No. 1, Family's Dignity Full House, and The Human Condition, becoming the third person to win consecutive Top Excellence Awards at the KBS awards.

== Personal life ==
On April 3, 2022, it was confirmed that Kim was in a relationship with comedian Kim Jun-ho. The couple married on July 13, 2025, at the Grand InterContinental Seoul Parnas Hotel in Gangnam District.

== Filmography ==
=== Films ===
Year	Title	Role	Notes	Ref.
2012	Yak: The Giant King	Noksooni	voice	
2022	Come Back Home		Special appearance	

=== Television series ===
Year	Title	Role	Notes	Ref.
2013	Cheer Up, Mr. Kim!	Blind date	Cameo (Episode 123)	
2015	Mask	Kim Yeon-soo		
2018	My Strange Hero		Cameo	
2022	It's Beautiful Now	The plaintiff filed for divorce	Cameo (Episode 1)	

=== Television shows ===
Year	Title	Role	Notes	Ref.
2006–2007 2011–2015 2017–2018	Gag Concert	Herself	Lovers, Dignity of a Beggar, The Uncomfortable Truth, BBOOM Entertainment, Old Affair, I'm a Killer, YOLO Inn (Ok Bun)	
2007	Laugh Club	Herself	Season 2	
2013	Roller Coaster 3	Herself	Season 3	
2013	Ranking Girls	Herself		
2013–2014	Mamma Mia	Herself		
2013–2014	Family's Dignity Full House	Herself		
2014	Kim Jimin's Liking	Host		
2014	Crisis Escape No. 1	Host		
2014	The Human Condition	Host		
2014	Get It Beauty	Host		
2015	Happy Time	Host		
2015	Conte and the City	Herself		
2015	Pretty Avengers	Herself		
2016	Law of the Jungle	Herself	in Papua New Guinea 6 May - 3 June 2016	
2016	Talents for Sale	Herself		
2016	Battle Trip	Contestant	with Kim Min-kyung (Episode 31 – 32)	
2017	The Beauty	Herself		
2018	King of Mask Singer	Contestant	Under alias "Hollywood honeybee"	
2019	A Man Who Feeds The Dog (Season 4)	Cast member		
2019–2021	Comedy Big League	Herself		
2019–2021	Altoran	Herself		
2020	Celeb Beauty	Host		
2020–2021	Future Lecture	Panelist		
2021	Ssulvival	Host		
2021	Doctor Zhivago	Host		
2021	Becoming Smarter	Host		
2021	Goal Girls	Cast Member	Season 2	
2021	Cooking - The Birth of a Cooking King	Contestant		
2022	Battle in the Box	Participant		
2022	House Reversal	Cast Member		
2022	Open Run	Host		
2022	War of the Roses	Host		
2022	Restaurant in Line	Special MC		
2022	The Court Receiving King	Host		
2022	Camping in Love	Host		
2023	Going to Court	Host		

=== Web shows ===
Year	Title	Role	Ref.
2021	Golf Eve	Main cast	

== Accolades ==
=== Awards and nominations ===
Year	Award	Category	Nominated work	Result
2006	KBS Entertainment Awards	Best Newcomer Award in Comedy	"Lover"	Won
2012	KBS Entertainment Awards	Excellence Award in Comedy	"Dignity of a Beggar", "Uncomfortable Truth"	Won
2013	KBS Entertainment Awards	Top Excellence Award in Comedy	"Bboom Entertainment"	Won
2014	KBS Entertainment Awards	Top Excellence Award in Comedy	"Old Affair"	Nominated
2014	KBS Entertainment Awards	Top Excellence Award in Variety	Crisis Escape No. 1, Human Condition, Family's Dignity Full House	Won
2014	Korea PD Awards	Comedian Award		Won
2015	52nd Savings Day	Presidential Commendation	—N/a	Won
2015	KBS Entertainment Awards	Top Excellence Award in Comedy	"I Am a Killer"	Nominated
2017	Korean Entertainment Art Awards	Comedian Award	—N/a	Won

=== Listicles ===
Name of publisher, year listed, name of listicle, and placement
Publisher	Year	List	Rank	Ref.
Forbes	2023	Korea Power Celebrity	23rd	

== Discography ==
=== Singles ===
- "YK Family's Carol Racing" (2006)
- "Brilliant Is..." (2013)

== Radio ==
- KBSCoolFM Lee Sora's Music Square – regular guest
- SBS Power FM Kim Changyeol's Old School – regular guest
- MBC FM4U Heo Gyeonghwan's Starry Night – regular guest
