= GoCar Tours =

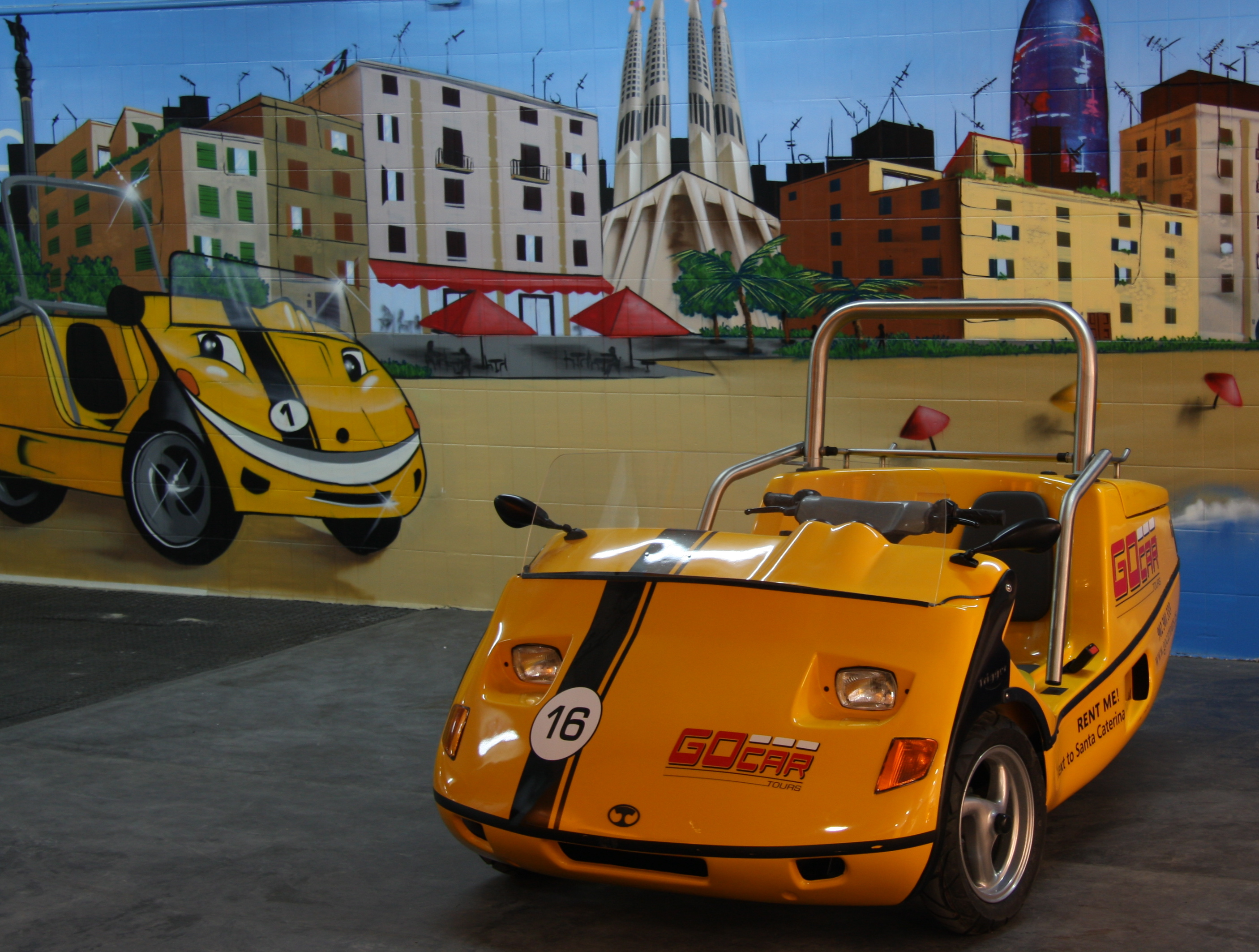
- GoCar pictured in GoCar Tours Barcelona Shop
- Type: Scooter
- Wheels: 3 Wheels
- Founder: Nathan Withrington
- Introduced: 2003
- Cities: San Francisco, San Diego, Miami, Barcelona, Lisbon, Valencia, Madrid

GoCar is a two-seater, 3 wheeled vehicle that runs with a 49cc size scooter engine. It is legally classed as a scooter to drive on the roads. The GoCars were created with the purpose of being rented to tourists as a different way to see a city.

== GoCar Attributes ==
GoCars run with a 49cc Scooter engine, made by Trigger Technics BV of Leiden, based in the Netherlands.

GoCars have an integrated audio GPS system which runs through the patented navigation software "FoundAround". This allows the cars to give driving instructions to passengers around specific routes, at the same time as providing a tour guide-style commentary around a city. The tour is played to the passengers through two 4-inch speakers inside the Gocar. The software is custom designed for GPS Tour creation and uses a "Tour Logic" to render to the user pertinent, contextual information.

The fiberglass-bodied cars are 92 inches long and weigh 380 pounds. For registration purposes, the vehicle is considered a motorcycle, but since it has three wheels, it can be driven by anyone with a regular Class D Driver's license.

According to the California Department of Motor Vehicles, they are approved for use on surface streets, but can't be driven on freeways or roads where the top speed is 45 mph.

== History ==
The GoCar Concept was conceived, developed and created by Nathan Withrington and Alasdair Clements in 2003 and the tour service was launched in April 2004 in San Francisco, United States. The software that drives the GoCar tour was patented in 2005. GoCars started being used as modes of transport available to rent in April 2004 by the company "GoCar Rentals Inc.". The company then became a franchise and soon opened in San Diego and Miami.

GoCar has since expanded into Europe, launching in 2008 in Barcelona and Lisbon, followed by Valencia in 2009 and Madrid in 2010.

== The Concept ==
The routes are created in order to navigate tourists around the largest places of interest that the city has to offer. The "FoundAround" software allows whatever type of commentary to be added along the tour, from informative sound bites to jokes and music, all in a number of different languages.

The GoCar plays each audio file when it passes through one of the pre-recorded GPS trigger points along the tours, travelling in the default direction of the tour. Each audio file has its own unique trigger point along the tour to ensure that the correct file is played throughout the duration of the tour. If the GoCar defects from the route, the GPS will pass through a trigger point that plays a track notifying the driver that they have left the tour, and giving an instruction to return to the tour if the driver so wishes.
