= Crisis Escape No. 1 =

South Korean television series

- Also known as: Safety First!
- Genre: Variety, Infotainment
- Written by: Lee Hyun-joo, Yoon Yung-kyung, Kim Hye-jung, Jung Ji-hyun, Lee Seo-eon, Park Kyung-jin, Park Min-jung, Sim Pyeong-eon
- Starring: Kim Jong-kook; Lee Sang-hun; Shin Dong-woo; Park Jun-gyu; Yu Jae-hwan
- Country of origin: South Korea
- Original language: Korean
- No. of seasons: 1
- No. of episodes: 527

Production
- Executive producer: Lee Hwang-sun
- Producers: Heo Joo-yung, Park Hyun-jin, Koo Min-jung
- Running time: 60 minutes
- Production company: KOEN MEDIA

Original release
- Network: KBS 2TV
- Release: July 9, 2005 (1, First) – April 11, 2016 (527, Final)

Crisis Escape No. 1 (Korean: 위기탈출 넘버원) is a 2005 South Korean television program. It aired on KBS 2TV on Monday at 20:55 from July 9, 2005 to April 11, 2016.

The shows aims to inform its viewers about how to overcome various crises that they may encounter in their lives, and claims they will make everyone experts at safety. It not only discusses crises such as natural disasters, it covers the topic of daily crises and how to avoid them, as well as overcoming them.
