= 2005 Mnet KM Music Video Festival =

- Date: November 27, 2005
- Location: Olympic Gymnastics Arena, Seoul, South Korea
- Hosted by: Shin Dong-yup and Kim Ah-joong
- Most nominations: TVXQ (3)
- Website: Mnet Asian Music Awards

Television/radio coverage
- Network: South Korea: Mnet; Japan: Mnet Japan
- Runtime: around 208 minutes

The 2005 Mnet KM Music Video Festival (MKMF) was the seventh of the annual music awards in Seoul, South Korea, that took place on November 27, 2005, at the Olympic Gymnastics Arena.

Shin Dong-yup and Kim Ah-joong hosted the 2005 edition of the awards ceremony. Boy band TVXQ was the most nominated act of the night with three nominations, where they won the Most Popular Music Video daesang for "Rising Sun".

== Background ==
The award ceremony was held for the seventh consecutive time, and the grand awards (or daesang) were still the Best Popular Music Video and Music Video of the Year. For the first time, the event took place at the Olympic Gymnastics Arena with Shin Dong-yup as a returning host and Kim Ah-joong as his co-host.

This marked was the last year that the two daesang awards were given, lasting up to seven years. The categories for Best New Male and Female Artist were joined as Best New Artist, while Music Video Acting award was added this year. A total of 11 Special Awards were handed, on the other hand, including the yearly Overseas Viewers' Award.

There were other notable guests on the event besides the presenters and performers, including the silhouette dancer for BoA's performance Hyoyeon, who would later debut as a member of Girls' Generation. Six Mnet characters 보, 쳇, 섭리, 병, 구, and 371 also made appearances.

After BoA's performance of "Girls on Top", she appeared to have fainted while coming down from the stage and was carried away on the back of her manager. Her agency reported that she was just exhausted after the 9-minute performance and having practiced without rest the day before. She later returned without concern to accept her award for Best Female Artist.

== Criteria ==
The following criteria for winners include:

Criteria	Percentage
Specialized Research Institutions; Music Video Preference	30%
Mobile Internet/Viewers' vote	30%
Professional Judges Examination	30%
Nominations Selection Committee reviews (consisting of 2005 M.net staff)	10%

== Winners and nominees ==
Winners are listed first and highlighted in boldface.

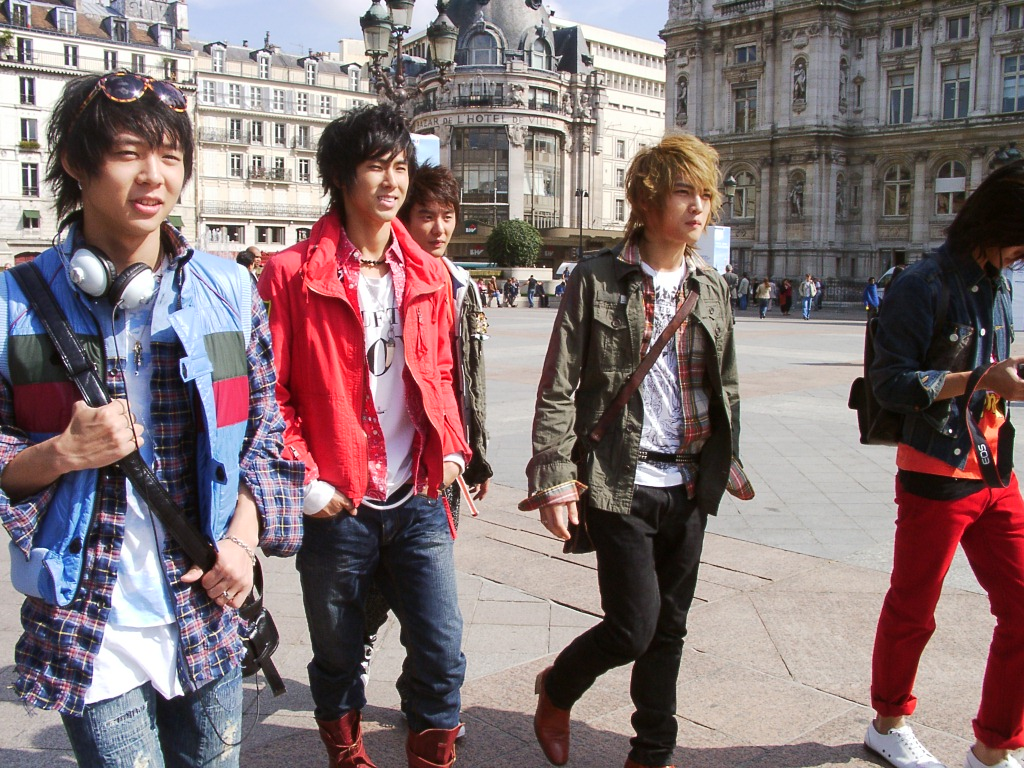
TVXQ, Most Popular Music Video

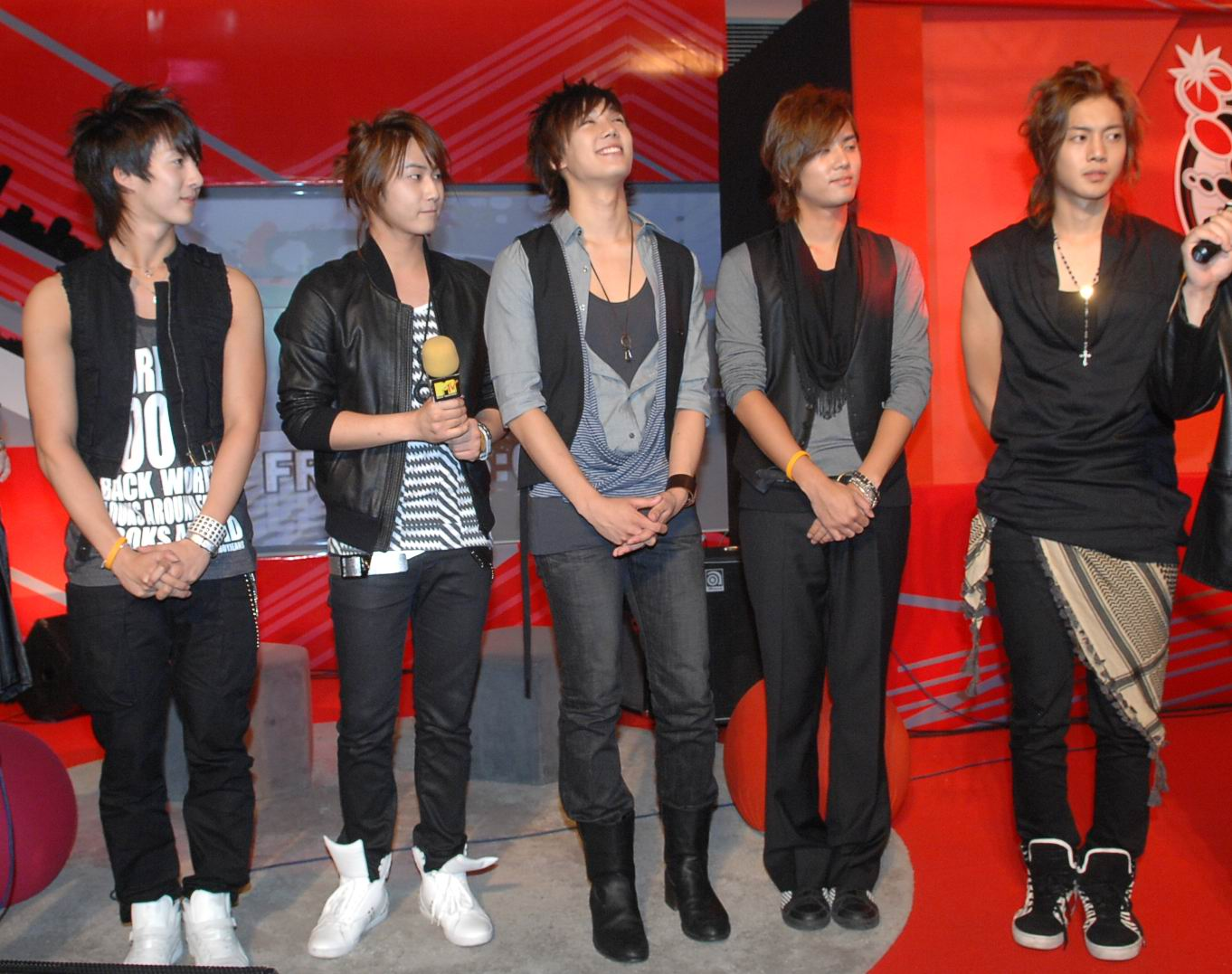
SS501, Best New Group

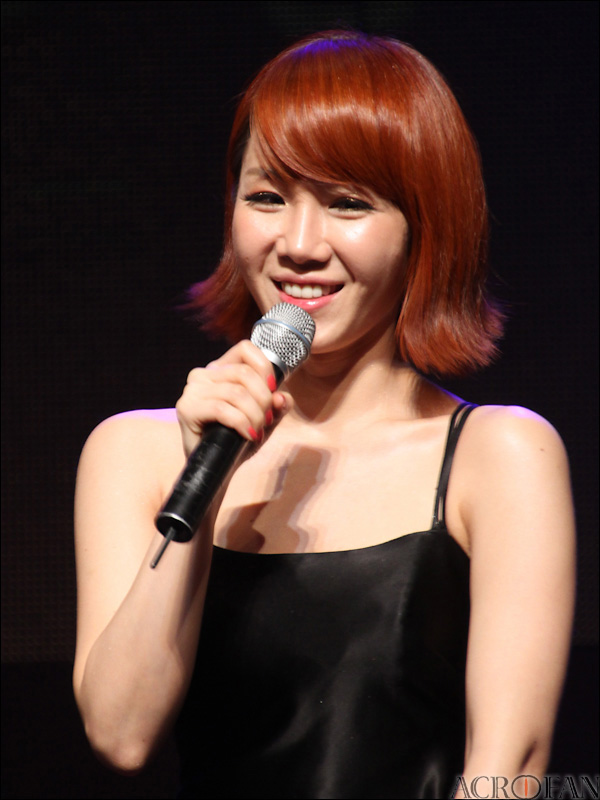
Lim Jeong-hee, Best New Artist

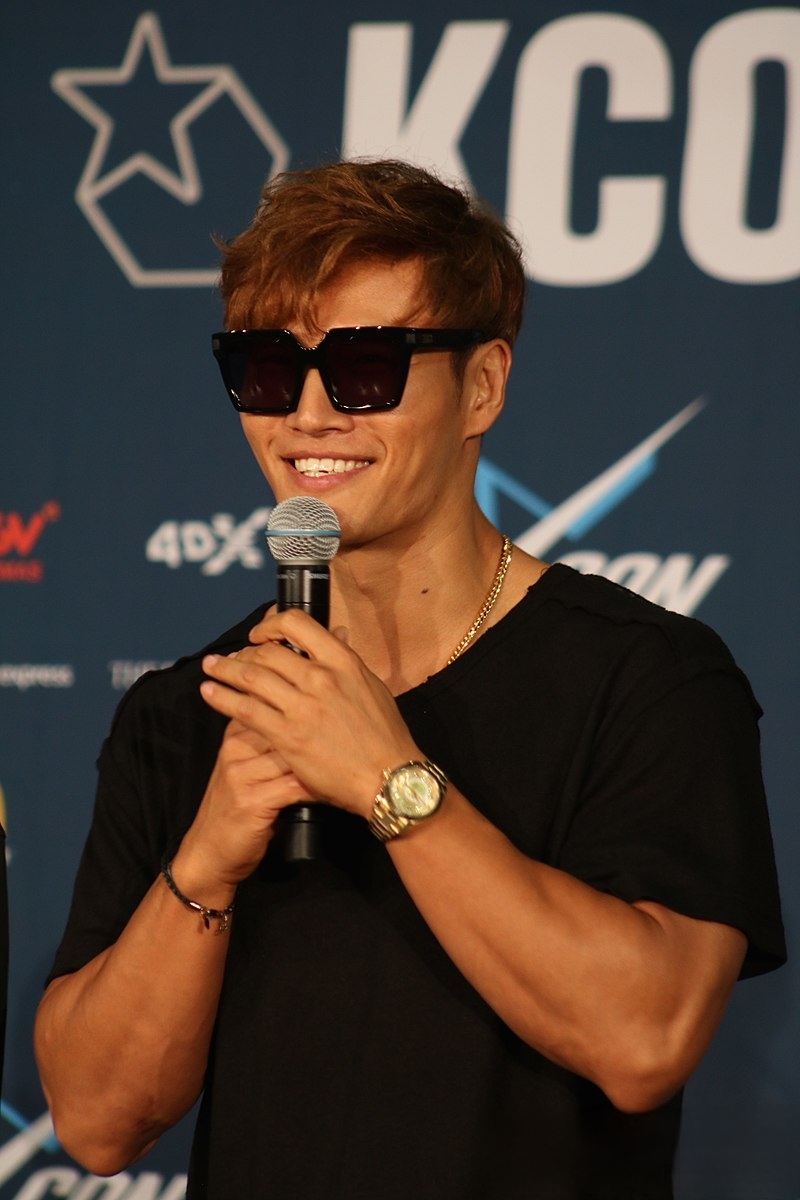
Kim Jong-kook, Best Male Artist

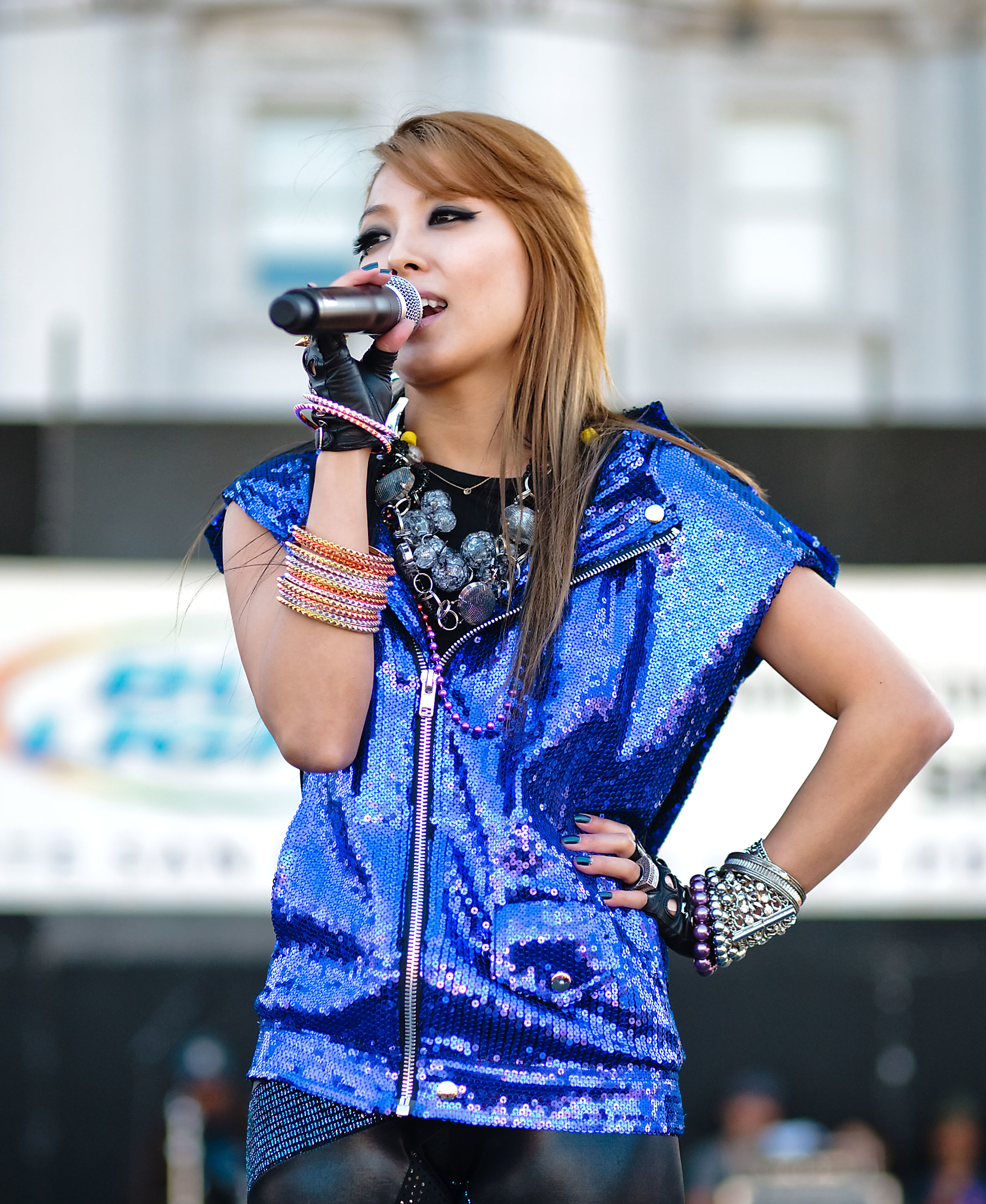
BoA, Best Female Artist

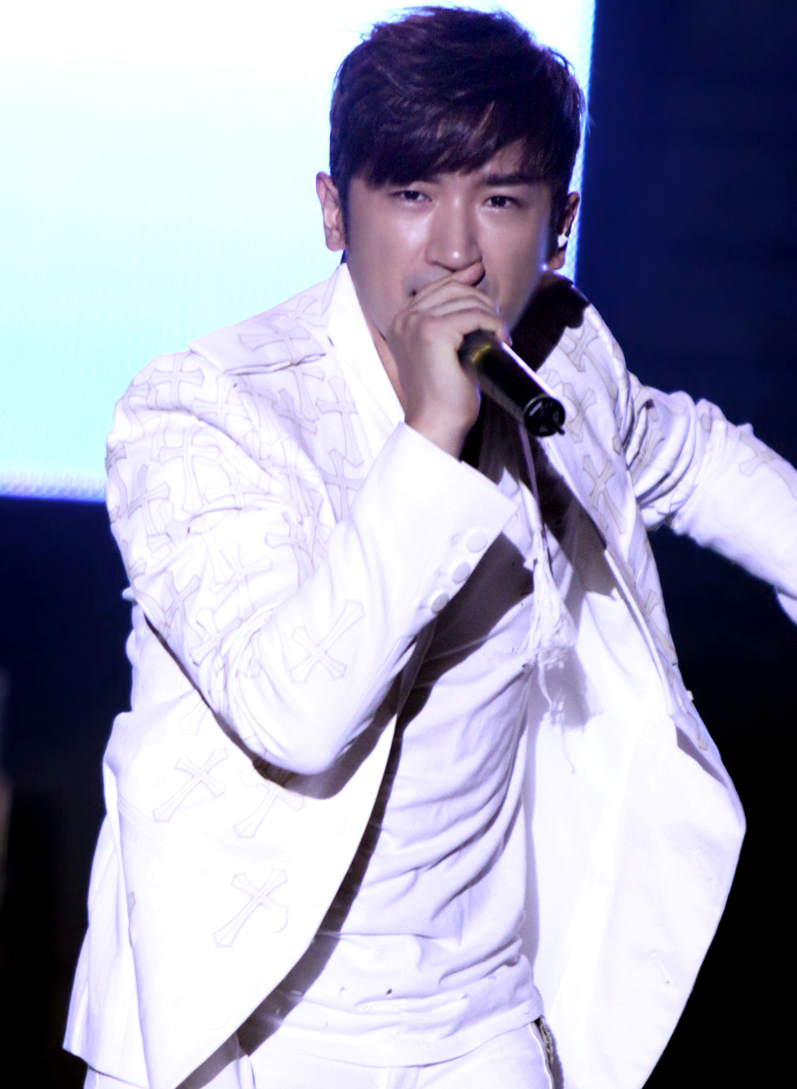
Lee Min-woo, Best Dance Performance

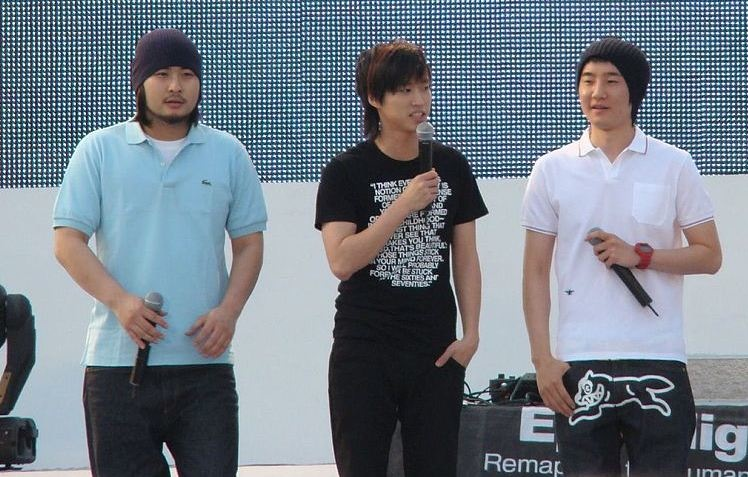
Epik High, Best Hip Hop Performance

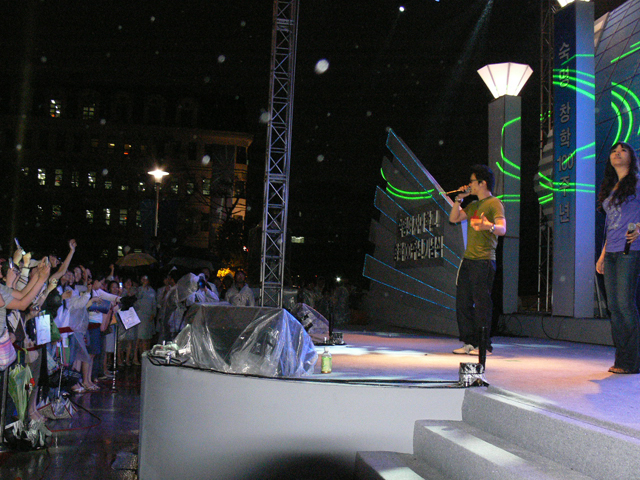
Clazziquai, Best OST

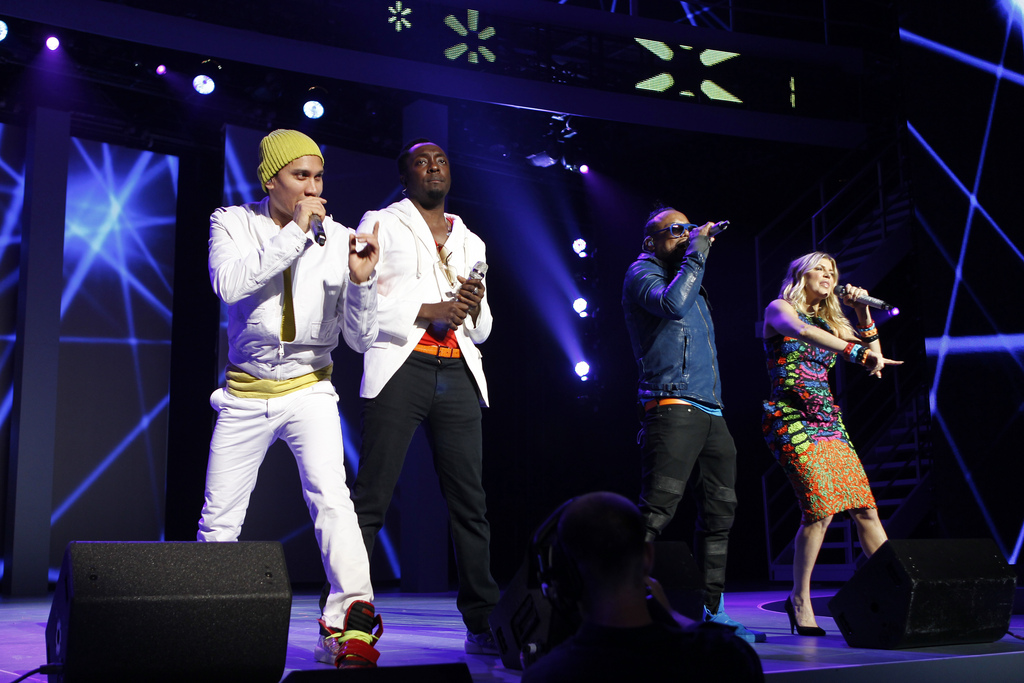
The Black Eyed Peas, Best International Artist

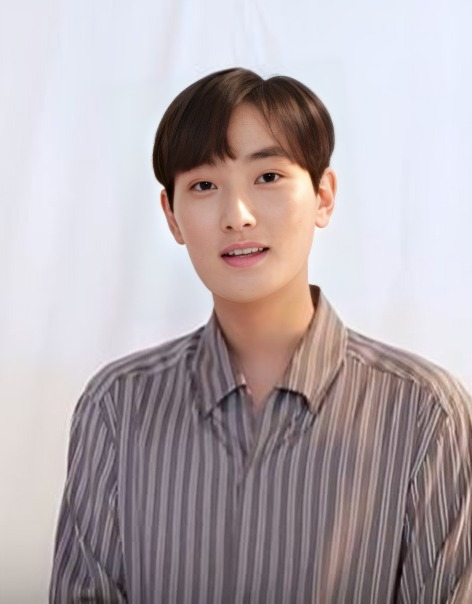
Kangta, Overseas Viewers' Award

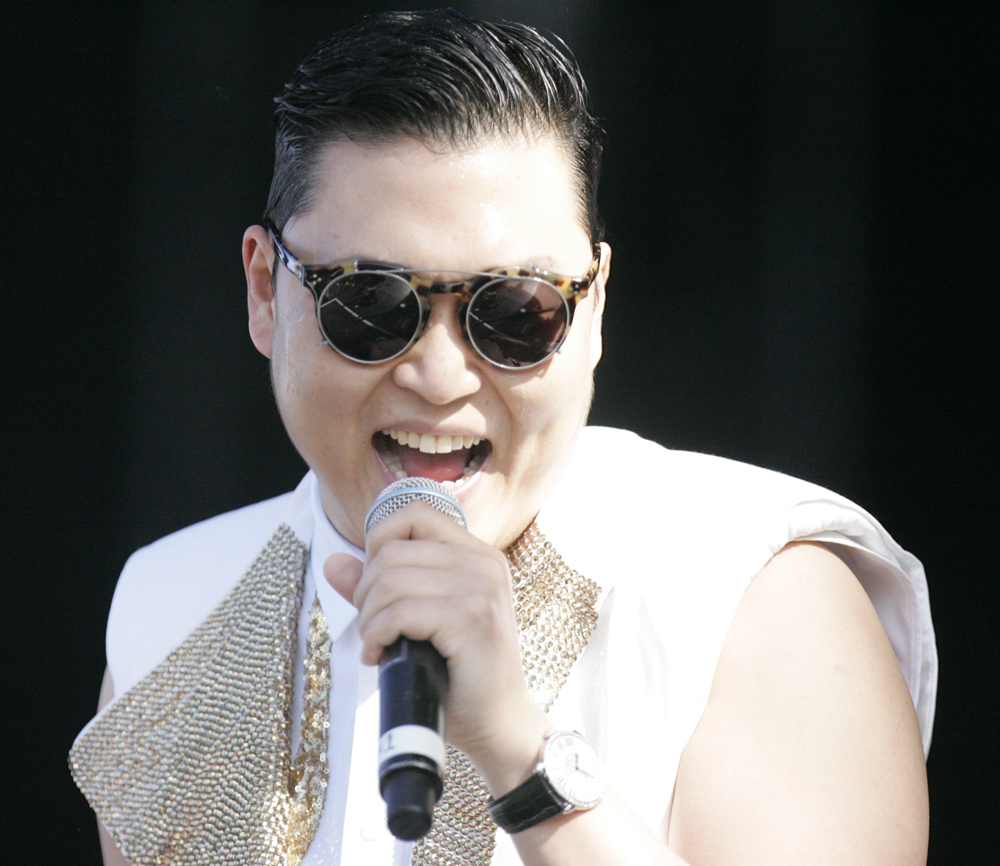
Psy, Best Video Performer Award

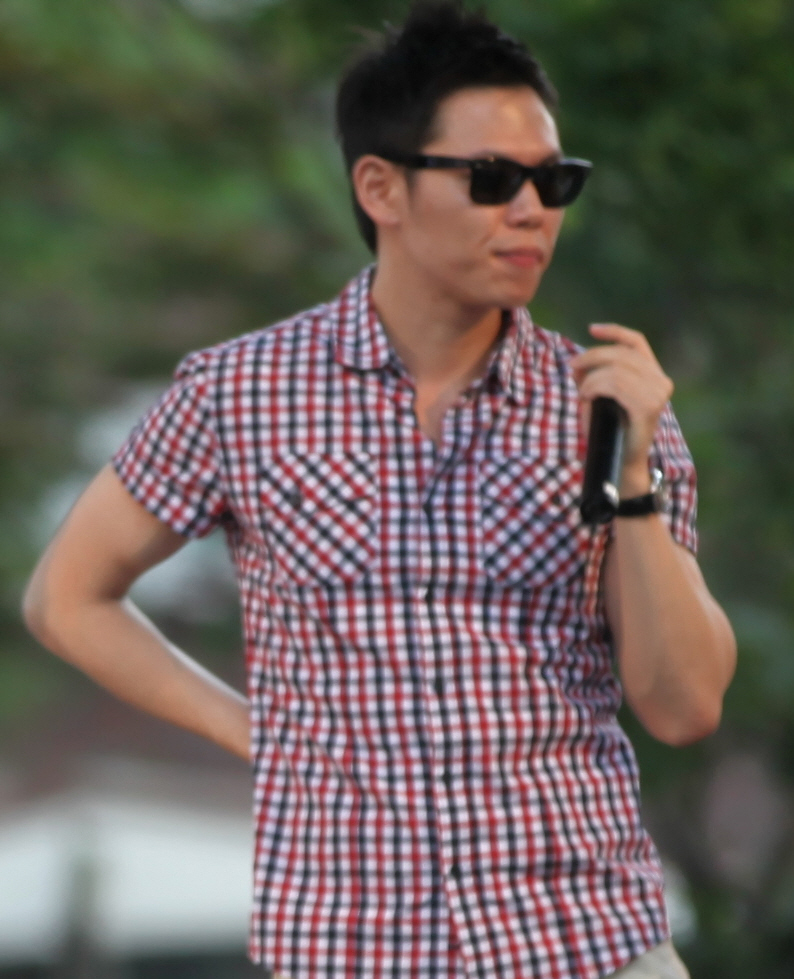
Jo PD, Judges' Choice Award

Most Popular Music Video (Daesang)	Music Video of the Year (Daesang)
**TVXQ – "Rising Sun"**	**Drunken Tiger – "Isolated Ones! Left Foot Forward!"**
Best New Artist	Best New Group
**Lim Jeong-hee – "Music Is My Life"**; Kyun Woo – "The Language of my Tears"; Kim Woo-joo – "The Letter"; Ivy – "What Happened Tonight"; WonWoo – "Missing In Happiness"	**SS501 – "Warning"**; Baechigi – "Nice To Meet You"; Soulstar – "Only One For Me"; The Grace – "Too Good"; Paran – "First Love"
Best Mixed Group	Best Ballad Performance
**Koyote – "1, 2, 3, 4"**; The Jadu – "Let's Play"; Rumble Fish – "Smile Again"; Cool – "Hey Its Summer"; Clazziquai – "Fill This Night"	**Shin Hye-sung – "Same Thinking"**; Kim Jong-kook – "Standstill"; KCM – "Smile Again"; SG Wannabe – "As We Live"; Tei – "Love... Is The Only One"
Best Male Group	Best Female Group
**SG Wannabe – "Crime and Punishment"**; TVXQ – "Rising Sun"; Buzz – "Coward"; MC the Max – "Don't Be Happy"; g.o.d – "An Ordinary Day"	**Jewelry – "Superstar"**; Diva – "Smile"; Big Mama – "Women"; Sugar – "Wise Farewell"; Fin.K.L – "Fin.K.L"
Best Male Artist	Best Female Artist
**Kim Jong-kook – "Standstill"**; MC Mong – "Invincible"; YB – "It Must Have Been Love"; Jo Sung-mo – "Mr. Flower"; Wheesung – "Goodbye Luv"	**BoA – "Girls on Top"**; Gummy – "No"; Lexy – "Tears"; Jang Yun-jeong – "Really!"; Chae Yeon – "Two Of Us"
Best R&B Performance	Best Rock Performance
**Wheesung – "Goodbye Luv"**; Kangta – "Persona"; Gummy – "No"; Naul – "Ear"; Lena Park – "Day"	**Buzz – "Coward"**; Nell – "Thank You"; Moon Hee-joon – "A Small Village Called Memories"; YB – "It Must Have Been Love"; Jaurim – "Splendor Of Youth"
Best Hip Hop Performance	Best Dance Performance
**Epik High – "Fly" (feat. Amin. J)**; Drunken Tiger – "Isolated Ones! Left Foot Forward!"; Leessang – "I'm Not Laughing"; Joosuc – "Hip Hop Music"; Jinusean – "Phone Number"	**Lee Min-woo – "Bump"**; TVXQ – "Rising Sun"; BoA – "Girls On Top"; Jang Woo-hyuk – "Sun That Never Sets"; Clon – "My Love Song"
Best Video Performer Award	Best OST
**Psy – "Delight"**; Rain – "Me"; Lee Seung-chul – "A Fairy Of Shampoo"; Lee Seung-hwan – "I Ask"; g.o.d – "Promise"	**Clazziquai – "She Is..." (My Lovely Sam Soon)**
Music Video Acting	Best International Artist
**Ryoo Seung-bum – ("I'm Not Laughing" by Leessang)**	**The Black Eyed Peas – "Don't Lie"**
Best Music Video Director
**Seo Hyun-seung – "Goodbye Luv" (Wheesung), "Wipe My Tears and Put on Makeup" (Lexy) & Phone Number (Jinusean)**; Yi Jun-hyeong – "Don't Be Happy" (MC The Max) & "Hey It's Summer" (Cool); Jang Jae-hyeok – "Mr Flower" (Jo Sung-mo), "An Ordinary Day" (g.o.d) & "Only One For Me" (Soulstar); Jo Suh-yeon – "Standstill" (Kim Jong-kook), "Bump" (Lee Min-woo) & "Hip Hop Music" (Joosuc); Chang – "Invincible" (MC Mong), Ear (Naul), No (Gummy) & "Sun That Never Sets" (Jang Woo-hyuk)

Special awards

- YEPP Digital Popularity Award: **MC Mong – "Invincible"**
- Overseas Viewers' Award: **Kangta – "Mask"**

Technological Sector

- Filming Award: **Park Sung-il** ("Splendor of Youth" by Jaurim)
- Editing Award: **Song Geol** ("It Must Have Been In Love" by YB)
- Special Effects Award: **FX NINE** ("My Love Song" by Clon)
- Judges' Choice Award: **Jo PD – "My Old Story" (나의 옛날 이야기)**
- Gmarket Netizen Popularity Award: **Moon Hee-joon – "A Small Village Called Memories"**
- Planning Award: **Samsung Anycall** – Anymotion commercial (with Lee Hyori and Eric Mun)
- Mnet Plus Mobile Popularity Award: **TVXQ – "Rising Sun"**
- Mnet PD's Choice Award: **S.E.S.**

== Multiple awards ==
=== Artist(s) with multiple nominations ===
The following artist(s) received two or more nominations:

Nominations	Artist(s)
3	TVXQ
2	Drunken Tiger
2	Clazziquai
2	Kim Jong-kook
2	SG Wannabe
2	Buzz
2	YB
2	Wheesung
2	Gummy
2	BoA

== Presenters and performers ==
The following individuals and groups, listed in order of appearance, presented awards or performed musical numbers.

=== Performers ===
Name(s)	Performed	Notes
Psy	"Champion Rock version", "Delight"	"Chapter 1: Fire"
BoA (ft. young Kim Hyo-yeon)	"Over The Top", "Girls On Top"	"Chapter II: Over The Top"
Buzz (ft. All Black and Yijuno 이주노)	"Another Brick In The Wall Part 1 & 2", "Classroom Ideas", "Revolution"	"Chapter III: Revolution"
The Grace, Super Junior, TVXQ	"You Are In My Unclear Memory", "LOVE", "T.O.P", " I Yah!", "Twins (Knock Out)", "Boomerang (Remix)", "Rising Sun"	"Chapter IV: Reloaded"
Shin Hye-sung, Tei, Kim Jong-kook, Kim Ah-joong, Bak Hui-jin (박희진)	"An Ideal Woman", "좋아좋아"	"Chapter V: Men In Love"
Drunken Tiger, T, Dynamic Duo, Jeon In-kwon (전인권)	"Isolated Ones! Left Foot Forward!", "March". "Dolgo Dolgo Dolgo"	"Chapter VI: 行進"
Clon, Jang Woo-hyuk, Lee Min-woo	Dance medley	"Chapter VII: Escape"
Epik High and SG Wannabe	"Let It Be", "You Are Not Alone"	"Chapter VIII: Peace"
S.E.S.	"Friend – Second Story"	"Chapter IX: Eternity"
TVXQ	"Rising Sun"	Closing remarks (Most Popular Music Video awardee)

=== Presenters ===
Name(s)	Role
Shin Dong-yup and Kim Ah-joong	Main hosts of the show
Hongsuah (홍수아) and Lee Seung-gi	Presenters for the award for Best New Artist
TVXQ and Jang Hee-jin	Presenters for the award for Best New Group
Jae Hee and Kang Jung-hwa (강정화)	Presenters for the award for YEPP Digital Popularity Award
Park Si-yeon and Ji Hyun-woo	Presenters for the award for Overseas Viewers' Award
Bong Tae-gyu and Son Tae-young	Presenters for the award for Best R&B Performance
Yong-i (용이) and Choi Jung-won	Presenters for the special award for Judges' Choice Award
Jang Gwang-hyo, Kim Won-cheol, Yi Kyeon, and Bak Hui-jin	Presenters for the award for Best Mixed Group
Bak Jun-hyeong (박준형) and Kim Ji-hye (김지혜)	Presenters for the award for Best Female Group
Lee Da-hae and Eric Mun	Presenters for the award for Best Male Group
Jo Chang-seon (조창선) and Kim Sa-rang	Presenters for the award for Gmarket Netizen Popularity Award
Jo Hye-ryeon (조혜련) and Choi Hong-man	Presenters for the award for Best Rock Performance
Kim Heung-soo (김흥수) and Jeong So-young (정소영)	Presenters for the award for Best Ballad Performance
Kim, Tae-hyun (김태현) and Kim Shin-young	Presenters for the award for Best Video Performer Award
Lee Hwi-jae and Shin Ji	Presenters for the award for Best Music Video Director
DJ DOC	Presenters for the award for Best Hip Hop Performance
Yijuno (이주노) and Nam Hyun-joon	Presenters for the award for Best Dance Performance
Noh Hong-chul and Jerome (제롬)	Presenters for the award for Mnet Plus Mobile Popularity Award
Daniel Henney and Jung Ryeo-won	Presenters for the award for Best Female Artist
Jung Joon-ho and Han Eun-jung	Presenters for the award for Best Male Artist
Gang Seok-hui 강석희 (CJ Media)	Presenter for the award for Music Video of the Year
Gang Seok-hui 강석희 (CJ Media)	Presenters for the award for Most Popular Music Video
