= Turbo (South Korean band) =

South Korean boy band

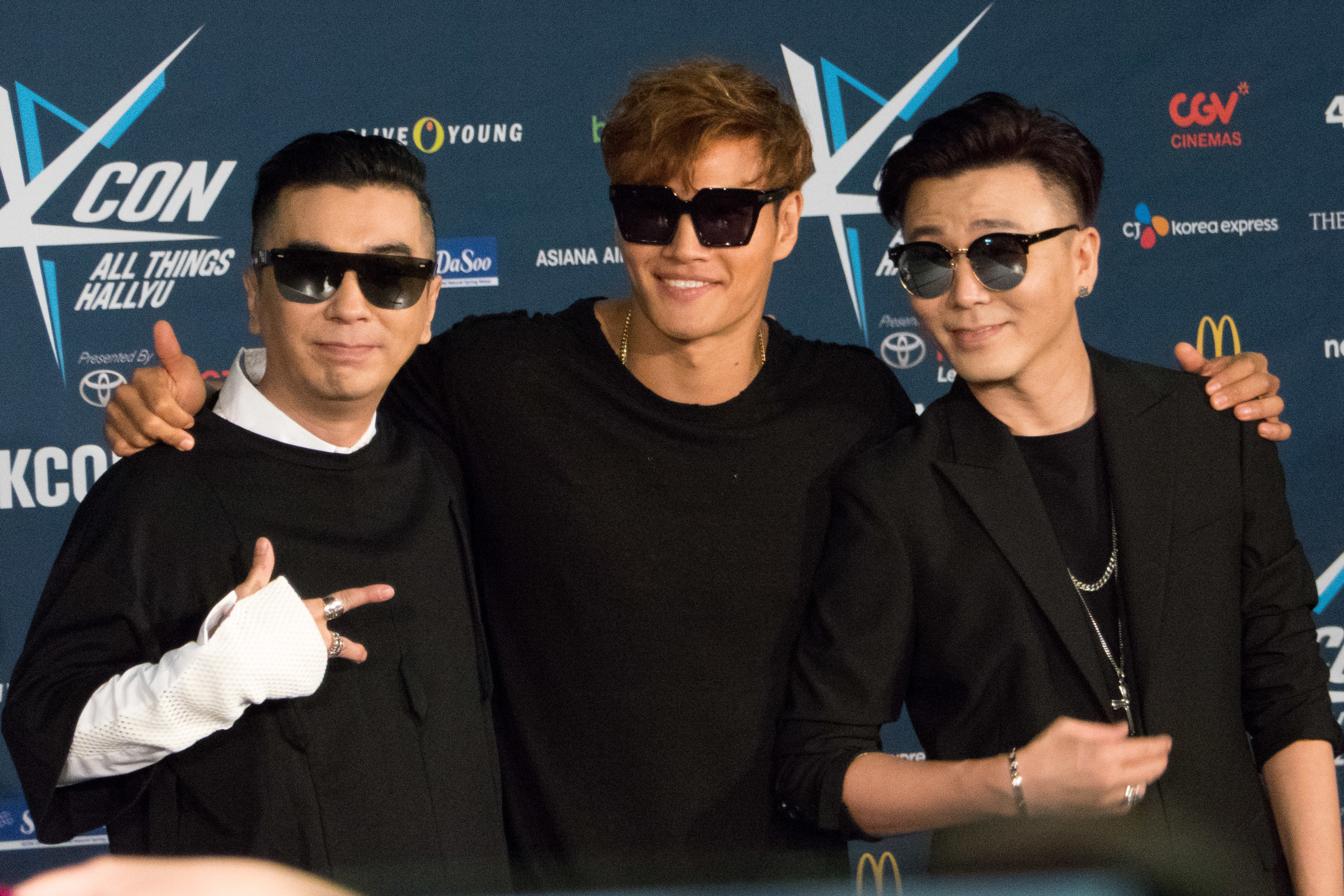
- From left: Kim Jung-nam, Kim Jong-kook, Mikey, KCON LA 2016.

Background information
- Origin: Seoul, South Korea
- Genres: K-pop; dance; hip hop
- Years active: 1995–2001; 2015–2017
- Labels: GM Agency (1995–2001); The Turbo Co. (2015–present)
- Members: Kim Jung-nam; Kim Jong-kook; Mikey

Turbo (Korean: 터보) was a South Korean dance-oriented group, mostly popular during the late 1990s to early 2000s. The group was originally a duo consisting of Kim Jong-kook and Kim Jung-nam. In early 1997, Kim Jung-nam left the group and Kim Jong-kook later continued promotion with new member Mikey. They were a prominent act in the Korean entertainment industry during their active years from 1995 to 2001, achieving strong album and record sales across Asia. In 2015, they made a comeback as a trio after 15 years with "Again".

== Career ==
=== 1995–1996: Formation and early years ===
Prior to Turbo's formation, Kim Jung-nam was a DJ while Kim Jong-kook was the vocalist for a high school band. With Jung-nam taking up rap and choreography and Jong-kook in charge of vocals, the group released their first album, 280 km/h Speed, in August 1995. The album sold over 300,000 copies by December of that year.

Just a year after their debut, Turbo returned with their second album, New Sensation. The album sold 800,000 copies within the first two months. After "Twist King" Turbo performed "Love Is...(3+3=0)" and "어느 재즈 바... (At the Jazz Bar...)". However, during the album's promotions, their company's CEO was revealed to have assaulted its singers and stolen hundreds of millions of won in profits, and Turbo went into seclusion. Kim Jung-nam, unable to reconcile his differences with the management, left the group, leaving Kim Jong Kook looking for a new partner.

=== 1997–2001: Addition of Mikey and disbandment ===
Auditioning against 3,500 other hopefuls, California resident Mikey was the one to become part of Turbo. With his addition, Turbo returned in October 1997 with their 3rd album, Born Again.... During this time, Turbo sang with American singer and movie star Will Smith for the Korean version of his fourth single "Just the Two of Us".

In September 1998, while preparing for their 4th album, Kim Jong-kook injured his hip, hampering the album's release. After a month-long rest, Kim returned to activities, and the album, entitled Perfect Love, was eventually released in October 1998.

On December 30, 1998, Turbo was invited to participate in the Asia Superconcert to represent South Korea. This concert featured singers from all over Asia including Japan, Hong Kong, Malaysia and Taiwan and was to broadcast live to South Korea, China and Japan. Kim Jong-kook received criticism for his lack of effort while lip-syncing and leaving without bowing during Turbo's performance. Due to this incident, Kim Jong-kook and Turbo's company were strictly warned and put under strong sanctions. The ban was lifted in October 1999, and 4 months later in 2000, Turbo returned with their 5th album Email My Heart.

On April 7, 2001, Turbo's agency Star Music announced that Kim Jong-kook had left the company due to contract expiration. To end their career, Turbo released one last album titled "History" revisiting all their hit songs from previous albums and including 3 new songs. A music video for "History" was also released, featuring transgender model and singer Harisu.

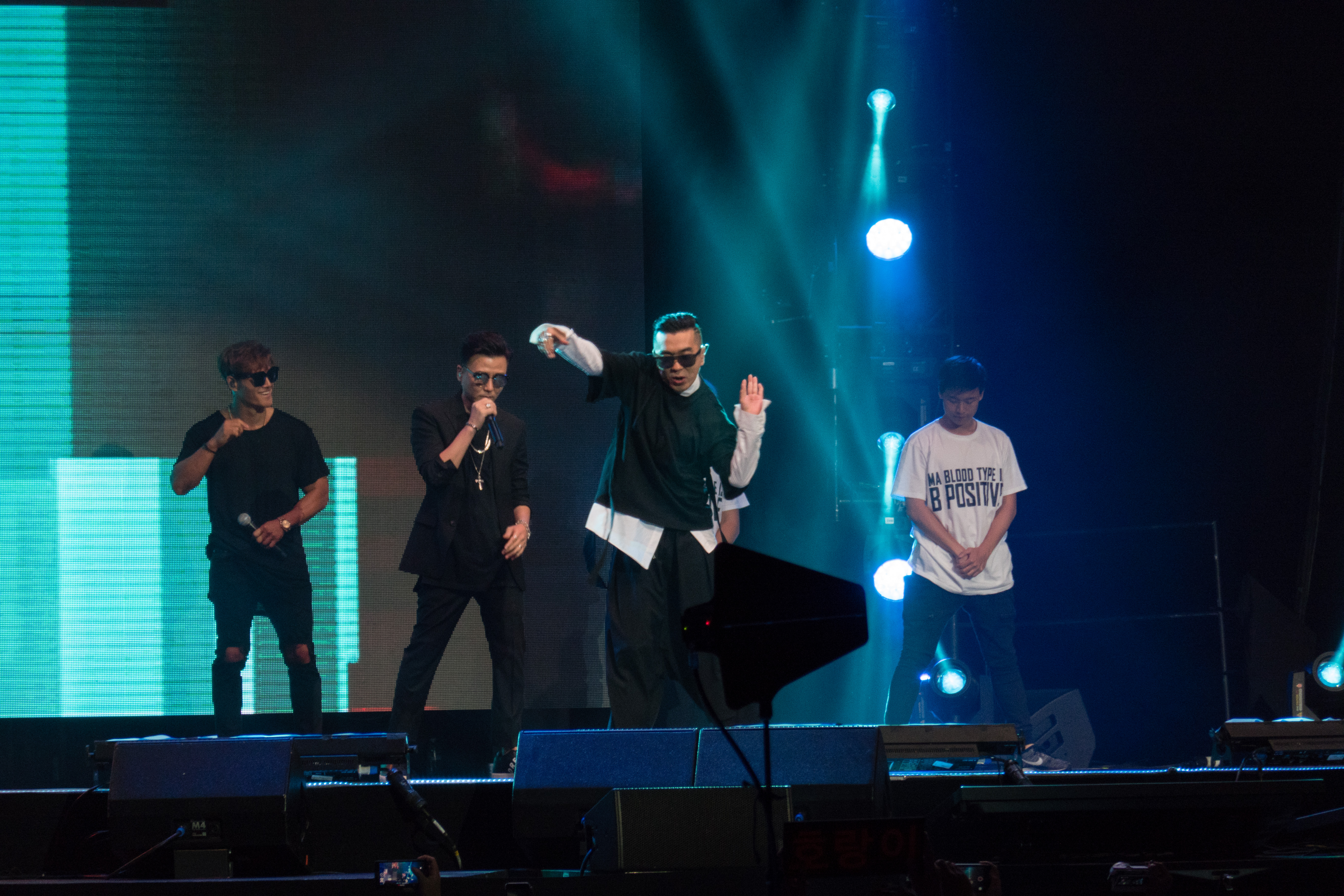
On stage KCON LA 2016, July 30.

=== Reunion ===
Prior to the reunion, the group performed in many television shows like MBC's Infinite Challenge "Saturday, Saturday's: I Am a Singer Special" on December 27, 2014, on which they performed "My Childhood Dreams", "Twist King", "Love Is (3+3=0)" and "White Love". However, in this performance Kim Jung-nam is with Kim Jong-kook instead of Mikey. The group then performed again on January 25, 2015, one month after their last performance, on SBS's Inkigayo 800th episode special, performing "December" and "White Love". However, this time Mikey is performing with Kim Jong-kook instead of Kim Jung-nam.

In celebration of the group's 20th anniversary, all three previous members reunited for the first time in nearly 15 years in 2015. The group released their comeback album on December 21, featuring all three members. Their title song track "Again" features comedian Yoo Jae-suk, and the music video has many guest appearances, including Lee Kwang-soo and Cha Tae-hyun. On July 25, 2017, they released their first mini-album Turbo Splash, with "Hot Sugar" serving as the album's title track. They also appeared on many television variety shows like SBS's Running Man and KBS 2TV's Happy Together. Kim Jung-nam and Mikey also appeared on KBS 2TV's Hello Counselor.

== Members ==
- Kim Jung-nam (김정남): 1995–1997; 2015–2017
- Kim Jong-kook (김종국): 1995–2001; 2015–2017
- Mikey (Jo Myung-ik) (마이키 (조명익)): 1997–2001; 2015–2017

== Discography ==
=== Studio albums ===
Title	Album details	Peak chart positions	Sales
Title	Album details	KOR	Sales
280 km/h Speed	Released: September 6, 1995; Label: GM Agency, Doremi Media; Format: CD, cassette	—N/a*	
New Sensation	Released: August 14, 1996; Label: GM Agency, Doremi Media; Format: CD, cassette	—N/a*	KOR: 800,000+
Born Again	Released: October 22, 1997; Label: GM Agency, Doremi Media; Format: CD, cassette	—N/a*	KOR: 800,000+
Perfect Love	Released: October 17, 1998; Label: GM Agency, Doremi Media; Format: CD, cassette	23*	KOR: 562,478+
E-Mail My Heart	Released: January 26, 2000; Label: GM Agency, Doremi Media; Format: CD, cassette	3	KOR: 595,401+
Again	Released: December 21, 2015; Label: The Turbo Company; Format: CD, digital download; Track listing: 1. 다시 (Again feat. Yoo Jae Suk); 2. 숨바꼭질 (Hide and Seek); 3. 댄싱퀸(Dancing Queen) prod. by 주영훈; 4. 잘 지내(Are You Living Well? feat. Lena Park); 5. ... is Love; 6. 나비효과(Butterfly Effect); 7. 하얀거리(White Street) prod. by 윤일상; 8. 어느 째즈바 2015(Some Jazz Bar 2015); 9. 악몽(Nightmare); 10. 가요 톱 10(Top 10 Songs feat. Lee Ha Neul, Jinu & Lee Sang Min); 11. 행복했으면 좋겠다(I Hope You Will Be Happy feat San.E); 12. 우리 (We feat. K.Will & Jessi); 13. Sunshine (feat.Soya); 14. Happy Birthday To You (Bagagee Viphex13 Remix)	3	KOR: 12,543+
* The Recording Industry Association of Korea album chart was launched in January 1999.

=== Compilation albums ===
Title	Album details	Peak chart positions	Sales
Title	Album details	KOR	Sales
History	Released: June 19, 2001; Label: GM Agency, Doremi Media; Format: CD, cassette	7	KOR: 101,869+
Reboot: The Best	Released: November 24, 2015; Label: Ogan Entertainment; Format: CD, digital download	11	KOR: 1,598+

=== EP ===
Title	Album details	Peak chart positions	Sales
Title	Album details	KOR	Sales
Turbo Splash	Released: July 25, 2017; Label: Turbo Company; Format: CD, digital download	8	

=== Remix albums ===
Title	Album details
X-Mas Dance Party Mix with Turbo	Released: November 29, 1996; Label: GM Agency, Doremi Media; Format: CD, cassette
Turbo Summer Remix	Released: June 24, 1997; Label: GM Agency, Doremi Media; Format: CD, cassette
Millennium Turbo Dance Megamix	Released: July 15, 1998; Label: GM Agency, Doremi Media; Format: CD, cassette

=== Singles ===
Title	Year	Peak chart positions	Sales (Digital)	Album
Title	Year	KOR	Sales (Digital)	Album
"My Childhood Dream" (나 어릴적 꿈)	1995	15	KOR: 125,917	280 km/h Speed
"Black Cat Nero" (검은 고양이 네로)	1995	94	KOR: 16,386	280 km/h Speed
"Love Is... (3+3=0)"	1996	12	KOR: 95,367	New Sensation
"Twist King"	1996	69	KOR: 40,452	New Sensation
"Forbidden Games" (금지된 장난)	1997	—		Born Again
"December" (회상)	1997	71	KOR: 20,989	Born Again
"X (The Greatest Love)"	1998	—		Perfect Love
"White Love" (스키장에서)	1998	34	KOR: 98,280	Perfect Love
"D.D.R"	2000	—		Email My Heart
"Cyber Love"	2000	—		Email My Heart
"Again" (다시) (feat. Yoo Jae-suk)	2015	1	KOR: 359,393	Again
"Hide and Seek" (숨바꼭질)	2015	16	KOR: 68,046	Again
"Hot Sugar" (뜨거운 설탕)	2017	—	KOR: 17,270	Turbo Splash
"—" denotes release did not chart. Note: The Gaon Music Chart was established in 2010.

== Awards and nominations ==
Year	Award	Category	Nominated work	Result
1996	Sports Seoul Music Award	Bonsang Award (Main Prize)	Turbo 2nd Album	Won
1996	SBS Music Award	Bonsang Award (Main Prize)	—N/a	Won
1996	KBS Music Award	Bonsang Award (Main Prize)	—N/a	Won
1996	MBC Music Award	Bonsang Award (Main Prize)	—N/a	Won
1996	Golden Disk Awards	Bonsang Award (Main Prize)	Turbo 2nd Album: Twist King	Won
1997	Golden Disk Awards	Bonsang Award (Main Prize)	Turbo 3rd Album: Goodbye Yesterday	Won
1997	SBS Music Award	Bonsang Award (Main Prize)	—N/a	Won
1997	KBS Music Award	Bonsang Award (Main Prize)	Turbo 3rd Album: Born Again	Won
1997	MBC Music Award	Bonsang Award (Main Prize)	—N/a	Won
1998	SBS Music Award	Bonsang Award (Main Prize)	Turbo 4th Album: Perfect Love	Won
1998	KBS Music Award	Bonsang Award (Main Prize)	—N/a	Won
1998	MBC Music Award	Bonsang Award (Main Prize)	—N/a	Won
2000	Golden Disk Awards	Bonsang Award (Main Prize)	Turbo 5th Album: E-mail My Heart	Won
2000	SBS Music Award	Bonsang Award (Main Prize)	Turbo 5th Album: E-mail My Heart	Won
2000	KBS Music Award	Bonsang Award (Main Prize)	—N/a	Won
2000	MBC Music Award	Bonsang Award (Main Prize)	—N/a	Won
