= Park Moon-sung =

South Korean sports commentator

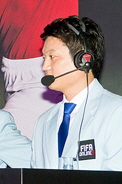
- Born: April 22, 1974 (age 51); Uijeongbu, Gyeonggi Province, South Korea
- Occupation: Sports commentator

Korean name
- Hangul: 박문성
- RR: Bak Munseong
- MR: Pak Munsŏng
- Website: Park Moon-sung on Twitter

Park Moon-sung (born April 22, 1974) is a South Korean sports commentator. He is the commentator for the FIFA Online 3.

== Filmography ==
=== Variety shows ===
Year	Name	Notes
2016	Running Man	episode - 283
2020	Fly Shoot Dori— New Beginning	episode 1 - present
