= Mikey (singer) =

- Born: Cho Myung-ik; 30 January 1980 (age 45); South Korea
- Occupation: Singer
- Formerly of: Turbo, M3

Korean name
- Hangul: 조명익
- Hanja: 趙明翼
- RR: Jo Myeongik
- MR: Cho Myŏngik

Cho Myung-ik (Korean: 조명익; Hanja: 趙明翼; born 30 January 1980), better known as Mikey (Korean: 마이키), is a South Korean singer and member of the group Turbo.

== Career ==
Immigrating to America at the age of 6, Mikey had his dreams set on becoming a singer ever since watching videos of the popular group Seo Taiji and Boys. In May 1997, with the goal of becoming a singer, Mikey returned to South Korea alone. Just two months later he auditioned for Turbo among 3500 other hopefuls. Mikey shined both in his rapping skills and also his ability to speak English, gaining him the spot. Mikey took over the rapper position vacated by Kim Jung-Nam and reformed Turbo with Kim Jong Kook.

Resurrected with the addition of Mikey, Turbo returned in October 1997 with their aptly titled 3rd album "Born Again...".

After releasing the 5th album, Kim Jong Kook left the management due to contract expiration. Kim Jong Kook later pursued his solo career. Mikey, with his visa expiring, also took leave to New York City to study music under Paul Bae. To end their long career, Turbo released one last album titled "History" revisiting all their hit songs from previous albums and including 3 new songs.

In 2005, Mikey joined a trio group M3. Thereafter, he returned to US and became an insurance man.

In 2011, Mikey comeback with a single "All For U" featuring Kim Jong Kook.

In celebration of the group's 20th anniversary, all 3 previous members have reunited for the first time in nearly 15 years. The group will be returning to the music scene with a comeback album on 21 December 2015. Unlike the group's previous albums, all three members will be featured in the 6th album. In just within 24 hours, their first comeback song has achieved an all kill on all Korean Music chart.

== Discography ==
=== Singles ===
Title	Year	Peak chart positions	Sales	Album
Title	Year	KOR	Sales	Album
"All For U" (with Kim Jong-kook)	2011	37	KOR: 270,865	Non-album single
