= Soya (singer) =

South Korean singer (born 1990)

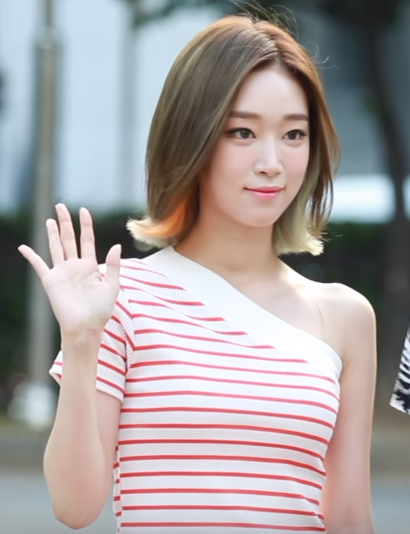
- Soya in 2018
- Born: Kim So-ya; April 2, 1990 (age 35); Seoul, South Korea
- Occupation: Singer
- Relatives: Kim Jong-kook (uncle)
- Musical career
- Genres: K-pop; Dance; Hip hop
- Instrument: Vocals
- Years active: 2010–present
- Labels: 101 Entertainment; Urban Works Entertainment; GH Entertainment

Korean name
- Hangul: 김소야
- Hanja: 金小夜
- RR: Gim Soya
- MR: Kim Soya

Kim So-ya (Korean: 김소야; born April 2, 1990) is a South Korean singer, known mononymously as Soya. She debuted in 2010 as a member of the duo Soya n' Sun under 101 Entertainment.

== Career ==
=== 2008–2009: Pre-debut ===
In 2008, Soya participated in the soundtrack for The World That They Live In. The next year, Kim sang three songs for the soundtrack of The Slingshot.

=== 2010–present: Soya n' sun, solo debut and first EP ===
In April 2010, Kim became a member of the duo Soya N'Sun. The duo only released one digital single before Kim debuted as a soloist in November with the single "매일매일 사랑해 (I Love You Everyday)" featuring her uncle Kim Jong-kook.

Kim participated in the reality show The Unit in 2017 but was eliminated early in episode 7, placing in 46th place.

In 2018, Kim released three singles, titled "Show" on 31 January, "Oasis" on 18 April, and "Y-Shirt" on 31 July.

Her debut EP, Artist was released on 17 October 2018.

== Personal life ==
Kim is the niece of Kim Jong-kook.

== Discography ==
=== Extended plays ===
Title	Album details	Peak chart positions	Sales
Title	Album details	KOR	Sales
Artist	Released: October 17, 2018; Label: GH Entertainment; Format: CD, digital download	—	—
"—" denotes release did not chart.

=== Single albums ===
Title	Album details	Peak chart positions	Sales
Title	Album details	KOR	Sales
Someday (이별에 베인 사랑까지도)	Released: September 27, 2019; Label: GH Entertainment; Format: CD, digital download	97	
"—" denotes release did not chart.

=== Singles ===
Title	Year	Peak chart positions	Sales	Album
Title	Year	KOR	Sales	Album
As lead artist
"I Love You Everyday" (매일매일 사랑해) with Kim Jong-kook	2010	37	—	Non-album singles
"NPNP" (내편남편) with KK	2015	—	KOR: 14,141	Non-album singles
"Show"	2018	—	—	Artist
"Oasis"	2018	—	—	Artist
"Y-Shirt (Deep Inside)" feat. Heedo	2018	—	—	Artist
"Artist"	2018	—	—	Artist
"Fade Away" (늘어진 우리의 연애)	2019	—	—	Non-album singles
As featured artist			—	
"Tok Tok" (톡톡) Mighty Mouth feat. Soya	2011	4	KOR: 1,727,453	Mighty Fresh
"Lalala" (랄랄라) Mighty Mouth feat. Soya	2011	12	KOR: 311,689	Non-album singles
"Bad Boy" (나쁜놈) Mighty Mouth feat. Soya	2012	8	KOR: 1,473,828	Non-album singles
"Good-Bye" Mighty Mouth feat. Soya	2012	29	KOR: 183,102	Non-album singles
"Nice 2 Meet U" (Prod. by Zico) Mighty Mouth feat. Soya	2016	64	KOR: 36,921	Non-album singles
"Good Time" Mighty Mouth feat. Soya	2024	—	—	Non-album singles
"Hello Summer" Mighty Mouth feat. Soya	2024	—	—	Non-album singles
"—" denotes release did not chart.

=== Soundtrack appearances ===
Title	Year	Peak chart positions	Sales	Album
Title	Year	KOR	Sales	Album
"Oh Tears, Oh Sadness" (눈물아 슬픔아)	2008	—	—	Worlds Within OST
"Will It Be Love?" (사랑일까요)	2008	—	—	Worlds Within OST
"Don't Love" (사랑하지마)	2009	—	—	The Slingshot OST
"Last Wish" (마지막 바램)	2009	—	—	The Slingshot OST
"So High"	2009	—	—	The Slingshot OST
"No One"	2018	—	—	Switch OST
"Maybe It's Love" (아무래도 사랑인가봐)	2018	—	—	Sunny Again Tomorrow OST
"Sometimes"	2019	—	—	Dear my Room OST
"3! 4!" (with DinDin)	2021	—	—	Hello, Me! OST
"—" denotes release did not chart.

== Filmography ==
=== Television shows ===
Year	Title	Network	Notes
2017	The Unit	KBS	Contestant
2021	Crazy Recipe Adventure	MBC	Contestant (Ep. 4)
