= Kim Jong-kook =

South Korean entertainer (born 1976)

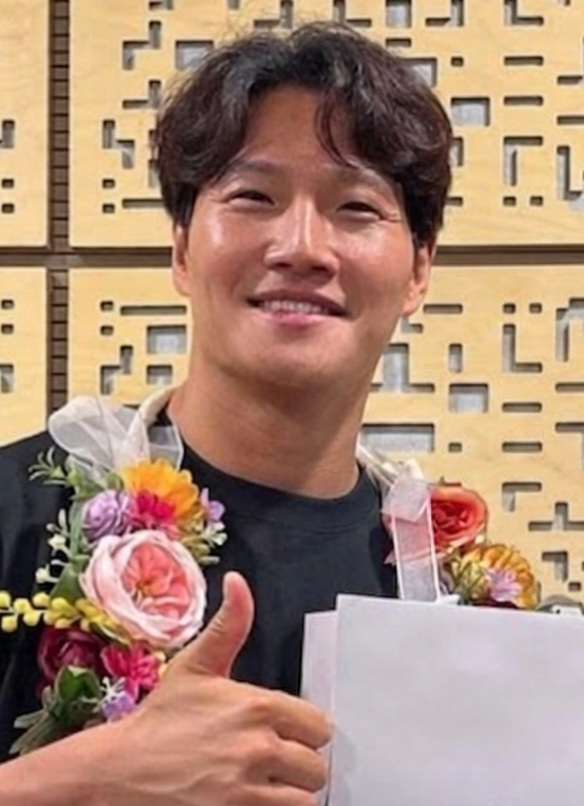
- Kim in 2023
- Born: April 25, 1976 (age 50); Seoul, South Korea
- Education: Dankook University
- Occupations: Singer; entertainer; actor
- Years active: 1995–present
- Agent: Galaxy Corporation
- Spouse: Unknown (m. 2025)
- Relatives: Soya (niece)
- Musical career
- Genres: K-pop; Dance; Ballad
- Member of: Running Man Brothers
- Formerly of: Turbo

Korean name
- Hangul: 김종국
- RR: Gim Jongguk
- MR: Kim Chongguk

Kim Jong-kook (Korean: 김종국; born April 25, 1976) is a South Korean singer, entertainer, and actor. Kim debuted as a member of South Korean duo Turbo in 1995. The duo was considered to be one of the most popular idols in that time and sold out millions of albums in South Korea and Asia. Following the disbanding of the duo in 2000, Kim released his debut solo album, Renaissance, in December 2001.

As a solo artist, Kim has received several awards, including three Golden Disc Awards, two Seoul Music Awards, two KBS Music Awards, two SBS Music Awards, two MBC Music Awards, one MBC Best 10 Music Award, one Mnet Asian Music Award, and one Melon Music Award.

Apart from his music career, Kim established himself as an entertainer, notably through his participation in variety shows including X-man, Family Outing and gained worldwide popularity following his participation in Running Man.

== Early life and education ==
Kim was born on April 25, 1976, in Yongsan District, Seoul, South Korea.

His family consists of his parents and an older brother, who is a doctor.

Kim attended Myeong Hak Elementary School, Shin Seong Middle High School and graduated from Hansei University in Bachelor of Arts (music composition).

He then obtained a master's degree from the Pop Culture Performing Arts – School of Arts Department of Dankook University.

== Career ==
=== 1995–2000: Turbo ===
Kim first entered the Korean music industry in 1995 as a member of the duo, Turbo, which became immensely popular for their catchy music. After the duo disbanded a few years later, he became a solo singer in 2001, mostly concentrating on ballads.

=== 2001–2005: Solo career and music daesang ===
Kim had a setback after Turbo as he faced difficulties settling down as a solo artist. Problems like lack of songs from composers, less support from his respected agency, and also a change of taste within the fans caused his first album as a solo artist to fail. However, he made a successful comeback with his second album Evolution in 2004, which spawned the hit single "One Man". Kim then became a permanent cast member of the popular variety game show, X-Man, which further raised his popularity.

In 2005, Kim released his third album, This Is Me. The album sold over 300,000 copies and became one of the best-selling albums in Korea that year. The lead single, "Lovable" topped various music charts, and was included in online games such as Pump It Up and Audition Online. Kim swept the Daesang (Artist of the Year) Award from all three major Korean TV stations, SBS, KBS, and MBC, becoming the second artist to accomplish this feat since Cho Yong-pil in the 1980s.

=== 2006–2014: Variety show, music releases, military service and rising popularity ===
Kim was made the leader of the first series of Shootdori, where kids who are interested in soccer form teams and compete. However, he had to leave the team after receiving an enlistment notice. He wrote and sang a song for his team, titled "Toward a Dream". Kim enlisted in March 2006. Around that time, he released his 4th album, Volume 4 - Kim Jong-kook's Fourth Letter. The music video of the lead single, Saying I Love You, featured Yoon Eun-hye, who was previously involved in a love-line with him in X-Man. Though Kim was unable to directly promote the album as, he was in the military, the album sold more than 100,000 copies and later won "Album of the Year" at the Melon Music Awards.

It was announced in late April 2008 that the singer would end his military service on May 23, 2008. On that day, he was greeted by fans, and during an interview, he said that he was "relieved". His fifth studio album, Here I Am, was released on October 22, 2008, with songs such as "Today More than Yesterday" and "Thank You".

Kim also returned to television, becoming a permanent member of reality-variety show Family Outing since episode 19, part of SBS's Good Sunday lineup. Family Outing has become one of the top-rated shows in Korea, consistently achieving the highest ratings for the Sunday mid-afternoon time-slot, and has gained online popularity among Hallyu fans.

His sixth album, titled The Eleventh Story was released on January 27, 2010. The album featured the singles "This is the Person" and "Don't Be Good to Me". The music video of the latter single featured fellow Family Outing cast member Park Ye-jin.

In 2010, Kim became a cast member of SBS' variety show Running Man. In 2011, he won the "Best TV Star Award" at the SBS Entertainment Awards. Kim gained pan-Asia popularity from the show, becoming one of the most searched Korean stars in Singapore, and having his showcase there sold out with more than 1,700 fans in attendance. He also enjoyed success in China, where he consistently topped polls such as being voted #1 Korean singer on the Chinese streaming website, Tudou, and being ranked second most popular Korean male celebrity on Baidu.

On November 1, 2012, following a pre-release of selected songs from his new album, Kim made a comeback to the music scene with the release of his seventh studio album, Journey Home, after three years. His fellow Running Man co-stars Haha and Gary participated in the album as well as former Running Man member Song Joong-ki, who starred in the music video for lead single "Men Are All Like That". The same year, he began to host the documentary program Crisis Escape No. 1, which won him the "Best Entertainer Award" at the 2013 KBS Entertainment Awards.

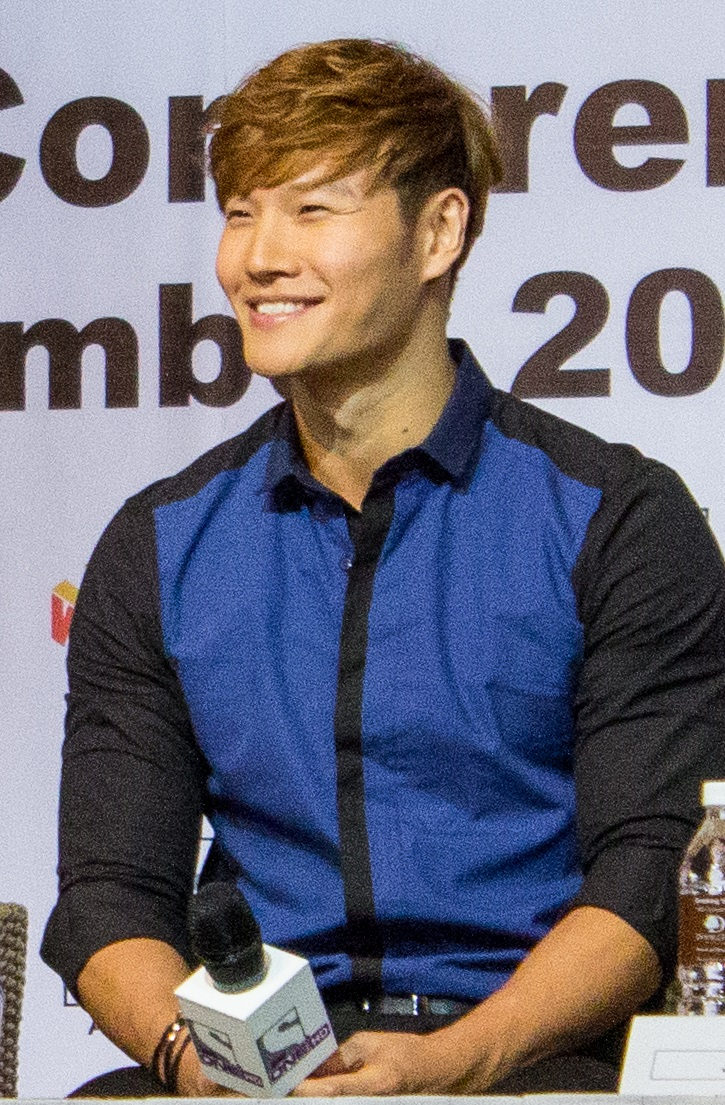
Kim in 2014

In 2014, he formed a duo with fellow Running Man cast member Haha, known as Running Man Brothers. The musical duo held a concert tour in the United States in July and December.

=== 2015–present: Acting debut, Chinese debut, Turbo reunion and entertainment daesang ===
In 2015, Kim made his official acting debut with a supporting role in the KBS drama, The Producers, and was praised for his "solid acting chops".

In September 2015, he left Urban Works ENT after his contract expired. He later went on to sign an exclusive contract with Maroo Entertainment in October 2015.

In December 2015, he and fellow Turbo members Kim Jung-nam and Mikey reunited for Turbo's 20th anniversary album. The album titled Again was released on December 21, 2015. The eponymous lead single, 다시 (Again), which features Yoo Jae-suk, topped online music charts upon its release.

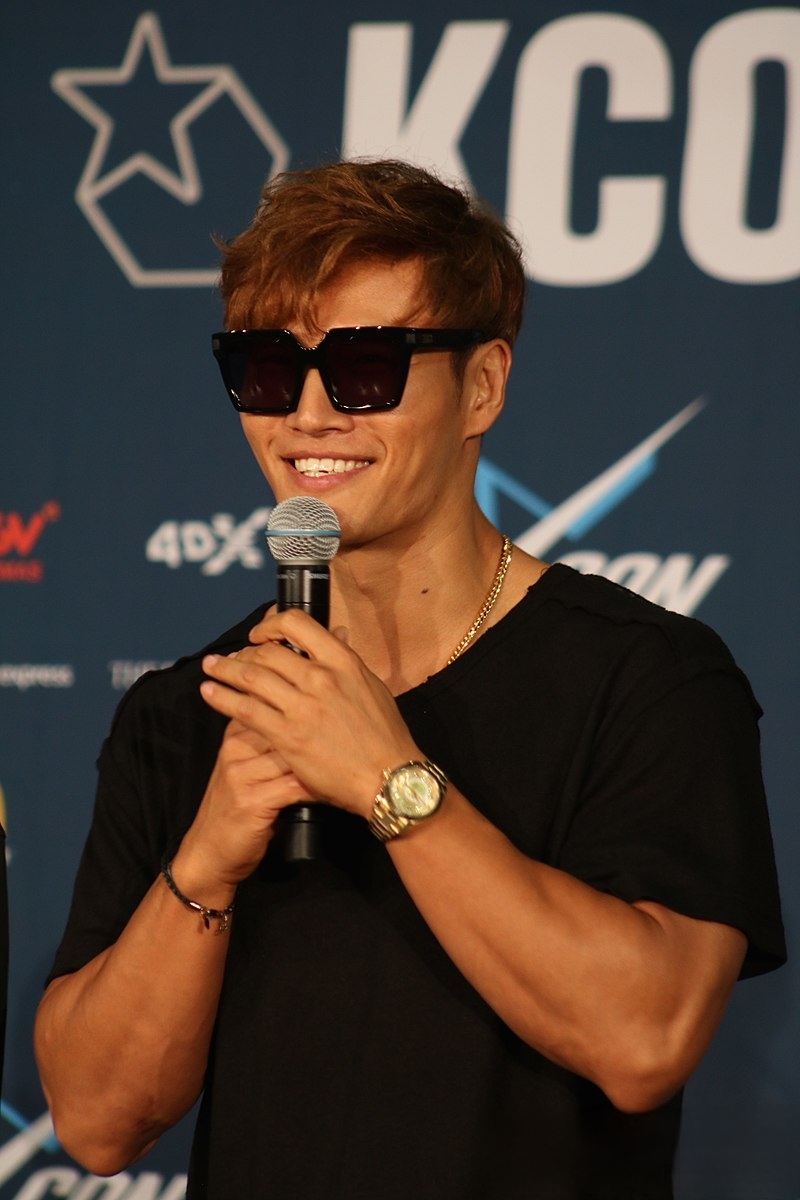
Kim in 2016

On August 23, 2016, he officially made his singing debut in China with his first single, "Hate That Happiness Came" (恨幸福来过), produced by JJ Lin and lyrics written by Vincent Fang.

On December 19, 2020, Kim made history by becoming the first male celebrity, and 2nd person ever to win a Daesang in both Music and Entertainment. He received the Grand Prize Award (Daesang) at the 14th SBS Entertainment Awards for his participation in Running Man and My Little Old Boy.

On June 17, 2021, Kim launched a fitness-focused YouTube channel "Gym Jong Kook" with 100,000 subscribers in the first five minutes. Within 4 days, the channel reached 1 million subscribers. He was part of the My Little Old Boy cast that was honored with the Grand Prize Award at the 15th SBS Entertainment Awards in 2021.

On April 28, 2023, Kim won the Baeksang Arts Award for Best Male Variety Performer for his work on Running Man, My Little Old Boy, and Gym Jong Kook.

On September 10, 2025, Kim left Turbo JK Company, which he founded in 2012. This also marked the end of his 18-year partnership with his manager Kim Gap-jin, who had helped run the company. He subsequently signed with Galaxy Corporation and moved there with his field manager, Cha Seok-bin.

== Personal life ==
Kim speaks both Korean and English.

He is close friends with Jang Hyuk, Cha Tae-hyun, Hong Kyung-min and Hong Kyung-in. The group is known as the "Dragon Brothers" for being born in 1976, the Year of the Dragon.

In 2010, Kim underwent lumbar microdiscectomy surgery for a herniated disk. His back issues also influenced his decision to serve as a public service worker rather than as an active-duty soldier during his mandatory military enlistment, a topic he discussed on the talk show Healing Camp in 2015.

In 2019, his hernia surgery was documented on My Little Old Boy.

=== Family ===
Kim's father was a career soldier who was later recognized as a person of national merit. This status could have allowed one of his sons to complete only six months of supplementary service; however, his father reportedly delayed applying for recognition until both sons had completed their military obligations.

Kim has an older brother, Kim Jong-myung, who is a plastic surgeon. His brother reportedly completed his military obligation as a military doctor.

Kim's mother, Jo Hye-seon, joined the studio panel of the SBS television programme My Little Old Boy when Kim became a regular cast member on February 25, 2018. She temporarily stopped appearing in April 2022 because of health problems and returned to the programme in February 2023. She subsequently left the programme following Kim's marriage in September 2025.

Singer Soya is Kim's first cousin once removed. Kim publicly introduced Soya as his niece during a concert on April 24, 2010.

=== Military service ===
On June 17, 1996, Kim received a Grade 4 classification during his military physical examination because of a herniated disc, assigning him to supplementary service as a public service worker. He began his service on March 30, 2006 and worked at the Hyochang Comprehensive Social Welfare Center in Yongsan District, Seoul. He was discharged from service on May 23, 2008.

=== Marriage ===
On August 18, 2025, Kim announced in a handwritten letter on his fan cafe Papitus that he would marry his non-celebrity girlfriend. He wed on September 5 at J Hotel in Gangnam, Seoul, in a private ceremony attended by family, friends, and colleagues.

On the 300th episode of KBS 2's Problem Child in the House, Kim revealed that he and his non-celebrity wife were close friends before they got married.

== Discography ==
=== Studio albums ===
| Title | Album details | Peak chart positions | | Sales |
| Title | Album details | KOR RIAK | KOR Gaon | Sales |
|---|---|---|---|---|
| Renaissance | Released: December 12, 2001; Label: Synnara Music; Formats: CD, cassette; Track listing: 1. Prologue; 2. Sad Story; 3. Angel; 4. 남자니까 (Because I'm a Man); 5. 행복하길 (I Wish You Happiness); 6. 사랑했었다 (I Loved You); 7. Disco; 8. 여인의 향기 (Scent of a Woman); 9. Love Story; 10. Thriller; 11. Night; 12. 1434; 13. One; 14. My Way; 15. 친구에게서 연인으로 (From Friend to Lover) | — | (Note: The Gaon Music Chart was established in 2010.) | |
| Evolution | Released: June 18, 2004; Label: Synnara Music; Formats: CD, cassette; Track listing: 1. 돌아와 (Come Back); 2. 용서해 기억해 (Forgive and Remember); 3. 니가 원한 이별 (The Parting You Want); 4. Feeling; 5. 슬픔 바램 (Fading Sadness); 6. 한 남자 (One Man); 7. 중독 (Addiction); 8. 그래요...그래도... (That's Right...But...); 9. Broken Heart; 10. 하루만 (Only One Day); 11. 태양 가득히 (The Full Sun); 12. Tonight; 13. 용서 (Forgiveness); 14. 그대가 잠든 사이 (While You Were Sleeping) | 6 | (Note: The Gaon Music Chart was established in 2010.) | KOR: 113,993 |
| This Is Me | Released: June 24, 2005; Label: Queen Entertainment; Formats: CD, cassette; Track listing: 1. 제자리 걸음 (Standstill); 2. 그녀의 남자에게 (To Her Man); 3. 슬픈 축하 (Sad Congratulations); 4. 선물 (Gift); 5. Happiness; 6. 사랑스러워 (Loveable); 7. 지우개 (Eraser); 8. Dream; 9. 토요일 밤 (Saturday Night); 10. 별, 바람, 햇살 그리고 사랑 (Star, Wind, Sunlight and Love); 11. One Night; 12. 친구에게 (To My Friend); 13. 바보 같은 나 (I'm a Fool); 14. 연습 (Practice); 15. 여전히 (Still) | 1 | (Note: The Gaon Music Chart was established in 2010.) | KOR: 303,049 |
| Fourth Letter (네 번째 편지) | Released: April 13, 2006; Label: 101 Entertainment; Formats: CD, cassette, digital download; Track listing: 1. 사랑한다는 말 (Saying I Love You); 2. 너만 모르는 이야기 (The Story You Don't Know); 3. 편지 (Letter); 4. 한 사람 (One Person); 5. 사랑이에요 (It's Love); 6. 고백 (Confession); 7. 사랑이 아파도 (Though Love Hurts); 8. 사랑지기 (Failing Love); 9. 그녀를 알아요 (I Know Her); 10. 토박이 (Native); 11. 첫사랑 (First Love); 12. 사랑했나봐 (I Think I Loved); 13. 이별도 고마워 (Thankful Even For The Separation); 14. 꿈을 향해 (Toward A Dream) | 21 | (Note: The Gaon Music Chart was established in 2010.) | KOR: 108,609 |
| Here I Am | Released: October 22, 2008; Label: Maroo Entertainment; Formats: CD, digital download; Track listing: 1. 고맙다 (Thank You); 2. 그리운 날들 (Missing Those Days); 3. 오래 오래 (Long Long Time) (feat. Mikey); 4. 어제보다 오늘 더 (Today More Than Yesterday); 5. Forever (feat. Mighty Mouth); 6. 이보다 더 좋을 순 없다 (Can't Get Better Than This) (feat. Shi Jin); 7. 그 집앞(序曲) (In front of That House (Prologue)); 8. 그 집앞 (In front of That House); 9. 사랑에 취해 (Poisoned in Love) (feat. Joosuc); 10. 이별의 정석 (Break-up Formula); 11. 이제는 안녕 (Goodbye For Now); 12. 사랑해 널 사랑해 (I Love You I Love You) (feat. Chang Dda-ee); 13. 어떤 사람 어떤 사랑 (Some Person, Some Love); 14. 우리 둘이서 (You and Me Together) | (Note: The Recording Industry Association of Korea album chart was discontinued in 2008.) | (Note: The Gaon Music Chart was established in 2010.) | |
| Eleventh Story | Released: January 27, 2010; Label: 101 Entertainment; Formats: CD, digital download; Track listing: 1. 이 사람이다 (This Is The Person); 2. 기다립니다 (Waiting); 3. 못 잊어 (Can't Forget); 4. 잘해 주지 마요 (Don't Be Good to Me); 5. GOOD BYE; 6. 내 마음이 사랑입니다 (My Heart is Love); 7. 잊을게 지울게 (I'll Forget, I'll Erase); 8. 다 알면서 (I Know Everything (feat. Soya)); 9. 구인 광고 (Classifieds) (feat. Mighty Mouth); 10. 떠나가지마 (Don't Leave Me); 11. 행복병 (Happy Virus) (feat. Mighty Mouth) | (Note: The Recording Industry Association of Korea album chart was discontinued in 2008.) | 3 | |
| Song (노래) (Remake album) | Released: September 9, 2010; Label: 101 Entertainment; Formats: CD, digital download; Track listing: 1. 기억이란 사랑보다 (Memories More Than Love); 2. 슬픈바다 (Sad Ocean); 3. 개여울 (The Neck of the Rapid Waters); 4. 다시 내게로 돌아와 (Come Back to Me Again) (feat. Gary); 5. 편지 (Letter); 6. 사랑하기에 (Because I Love You); 7. 당신도 울고 있네요 (You Are Crying Too); 8. 가을편지 (Autumn Letter); 9. 먼지가 되어 (Becoming Dust); 10. 토요일은 밤이 좋아 (Saturday Night Fever) | (Note: The Recording Industry Association of Korea album chart was discontinued in 2008.) | 15 | |
| Journey Home | Released: November 1, 2012; Label: JK Entertainment; Formats: CD, digital download; Track listing: 1. 니가 생각나 (Thinking of You); 2. 천 개의 발자국 (Thousands of Footprints); 3. 좋겠다 (You Should Be Happy); 4. 남자가 다 그렇지 뭐 (Men Are All Like That); 5. 너무 예뻤어 (So Pretty); 6. 너에게 하고 싶은 (Words I Want to Say to You) (feat. Haha & Gary); 7. Nostalgia (feat. Mikey); 8. 지워진다 (Disappearing); 9. 남자도 슬프 (Men Also Feel Sad) (feat. Mighty Mouth); 10. 끝이 아닌 이야기 (Story That Is Not the End) | (Note: The Recording Industry Association of Korea album chart was discontinued in 2008.) | 3 | KOR: 10,138 |
"—" denotes release did not chart.

=== Singles ===
| Title | Year | Peak chart positions | Sales | Album |
| Title | Year | KOR | Sales | Album |
Korean
| "Because I'm a Man" (남자니까) | 2001 | (Note: The Gaon Music Chart was established in 2010.) | | Renaissance |
| "I Wish You Happiness" (행복하길) | 2001 | (Note: The Gaon Music Chart was established in 2010.) | | Renaissance |
| "Feeling" | 2004 | (Note: The Gaon Music Chart was established in 2010.) | | Evolution |
| "One Man" (한 남자) | 2004 | (Note: The Gaon Music Chart was established in 2010.) | | Evolution |
| "Addiction" (중독) | 2004 | (Note: The Gaon Music Chart was established in 2010.) | | Evolution |
| "Walking In One Spot" (제자리 걸음) | 2005 | (Note: The Gaon Music Chart was established in 2010.) | | This Is Me |
| "Loveable" (사랑스러워) | 2005 | (Note: The Gaon Music Chart was established in 2010.) | | This Is Me |
| "Star, Wind, Sunshine and Love" (별, 바람, 햇살 그리고 사랑) | 2005 | (Note: The Gaon Music Chart was established in 2010.) | | This Is Me |
| "To Her Man" (그녀의 남자에게) | 2005 | (Note: The Gaon Music Chart was established in 2010.) | | This Is Me |
| "2005 White Love" (스키장에서) (feat. Mikey) | 2005 | (Note: The Gaon Music Chart was established in 2010.) | | Non-album single |
| "Letter" (편지) | 2006 | (Note: The Gaon Music Chart was established in 2010.) | | Fourth Letter |
| "Saying I Love You" (사랑한다는 말) | 2006 | (Note: The Gaon Music Chart was established in 2010.) | | Fourth Letter |
| "It's Love" (사랑이에요) | 2006 | (Note: The Gaon Music Chart was established in 2010.) | | Fourth Letter |
| "Only Wind Only Wind" (바람만바람만) (with SG Wannabe) | 2006 | (Note: The Gaon Music Chart was established in 2010.) | | Non-album single |
| "Today More Than Yesterday" (어제보다 오늘 더) | 2008 | | Here I Am | |
| "Thank You" (고맙다) | 2008 | | Here I Am | |
| "Happy Virus" (행복병) (feat. Mighty Mouth) | 2009 | | Eleventh Story | |
| "Give It to Me" (따줘) | 2009 | | Non-album single | |
| "This Is the Person" (이 사람이다) | 2010 | 7 | | Eleventh Story |
| "Come Back to Me Again" (다시 내게로 돌아와) (feat. Gary) | 2010 | 31 | | Song |
| "I Love You Everyday" (매일매일 사랑해) (with Soya) | 2010 | 37 | | Non-album singles |
| "All for U" (with Mikey) | 2011 | 37 | KOR: 270,865 | Non-album singles |
| "Men Are All Like That" (남자가 다 그렇지 뭐) | 2012 | 8 | KOR: 587,696 | Journey Home |
| "Reminisce" (회상) (feat. Joosuc) | 2012 | 28 | KOR: 127,823 | Non-album single |
| "Raise Your Voice" (with Kim Jong-kook, Haha and Gummy) | 2019 | — | — | Running Man Fan Meeting: Project Running 9 |
| "I Like It" (with Running Man cast members) | 2019 | — | — | Running Man Fan Meeting: Project Running 9 |
| "Forget Me Not" (지우고 아플 사랑은..) | 2020 | — | — | Non-album single |
| "Be My Lover" (바다 보러 갈래?) (with Kim Jong-kook X Ateez) | 2021 | — | — | Non-album single |
| "I Luv U" (with KCM and Mirani) | 2022 | 96 | —N/a | Non-album singles |
| "Spring Has Come" (봄이 왔나 봐) (with Yang Da-il) | 2024 | 125 | —N/a | Non-album singles |
Mandarin
| "Hate That Happiness Came" (恨幸福來過) | 2016 | — | — | Non-album singles |
| "Listening to the Sound of Rain" (聽見下雨的聲音) | 2016 | — | — | Non-album singles |
| "Don't Need to Return My Love" (我的愛不用還) | 2017 | — | — | Non-album singles |
"—" denotes release did not chart.

=== Soundtrack appearances ===
| Title | Year | Peak chart positions | Sales | Album |
| Title | Year | KOR | Sales | Album |
|---|---|---|---|---|
| "How Come You Don't Know" (모르나요) | 2013 | 8 | KOR: 191,982 | Good Doctor OST |
| "Trace of Tears" (눈물 자국) | 2014 | 74 | KOR: 23,043 | Love in Memory 2 OST |
| "Fool" (바보야) | 2016 | 89 | KOR: 18,861 | Sweet Stranger and Me OST |
| "Tear Thief" (눈물을 훔친다) | 2021 | 96 | | The Forbidden Marriage OST |
| "My Love" | 2022 | 200 | | Soundtrack #1 OST |

== Filmography ==
=== Film ===
| Year | Title | Role | Notes | Ref. |
|---|---|---|---|---|
| 2012 | Wonderful Radio | Taxi Passenger | Cameo | |
| 2015 | Hurry Up Brother Film | Himself | | |

=== Television series ===
| Year | Title | Role | Notes | Ref. |
|---|---|---|---|---|
| 2004 | Banjun Drama | Himself | Cameo (Episode 17) | |
| 2004 | Special TV Story | Himself | Cameo | |
| 2005 | Old Miss Diary | Himself | Cameo (Episode 224) | |
| 2015 | A Girl Who Sees Smells | Himself | Cameo (eps 1) | |
| 2015 | The Producers | Kim Hong-soon | Supporting role | |
| 2016 | The Sound of Your Heart | Jo Jong-kook / Jo Jong-wook | Cameo (Episode 17–18) | |

=== Television shows ===
Off-Air On-Air

| Year | Title | Role | Notes | Ref. |
|---|---|---|---|---|
| 2001–2003 | Dream Team | Main Cast | | |
| 2004–2006 | X Man | Main Cast | | |
| 2004–2006 | Happy Sunday | Main Cast | | |
| 2005–2006 | Real Situation Saturday Love Letter | Main Cast | | |
| 2005–2006 | Shoot Dori | Main Cast | | |
| 2008–2010 | Family Outing | Main Cast | | |
| 2010–present | Running Man | Main Cast | | |
| 2012–2016 | Escape Crisis No.1 | Host | | |
| 2014 | Everybody | Host | | |
| 2015 | Ding Ge Long Dong Qiang | Main Cast | | |
| 2016 | Talents for Sale | Host | | |
| 2017 | Let's go with Mom | Main Cast | | |
| 2017 | Dragon Club – Childish Bromance | Main Cast | with Jang Hyuk, Cha Tae-hyun, Hong Kyung-min, Hong Kyung-in | |
| 2017–2020 | I Can See Your Voice | Host | with Yoo Se-yoon and Leeteuk | |
| 2018–2025 | My Little Old Boy | Main Cast | Leaves show due to marriage | |
| 2018 | The Call | Cast member (1st line-up) | Ep 1–2, 5 | |
| 2019 | In Sync | Host | with Soyou | |
| 2019 | The Call S2 | Host | | |
| 2019 | Kill Bill | Host | | |
| 2019–2020 | Rewind | Team Leader | | |
| 2019–2020 | Five Cranky Brothers | Cast member | | |
| 2019 | Pink Festa | MC | | |
| 2020 | Fly Shoot Dori — New Beginning | MC | Episode 1-19 | |
| 2020 | The Voice of Korea (S3) | Coach | | |
| 2020 | Red-Cheeked Ramyun Lab | Cast | | |
| 2020 | Trot God is Here 2 - Last Chance | Special MC | Ep.38 | |
| 2021 | Crazy Recipe Adventure | Main Cast | | |
| 2021 | Ceremony Club | Main Cast | with Pak Se-ri and Yang Se-chan | |
| 2021 | Wild Idol | Host | | |
| 2021 | Running Man Vietnam | Guest | Ep.10 | |
| 2022–present | Problem Child in House | Cast Member | Ep. 174 - ongoing | |
| 2022 | With the Silk of Dohpo Flying | Cast Member | with Ji Hyun-woo, Noh Sang-hyun, Joo Woo-jae and Hwang Dae-heon | |
| 2022 | Kick the Number | Host | with Dindin | |
| 2023 | Authorized Personnel Only | Cast Member | with Yang Se-hyung and Lee Yi-kyung | |
| 2023 | Express Delivery Mongolia Edition | Cast Member | with Jang Hyuk, Cha Tae-hyun, Hong Kyung-min, Hong Kyung-in and Kang Hoon | |
| 2024 | Couple Palace | Host | with Yoo Se-yoon and Lee Mi-Joo | |
| 2024 | Stingy Man | Host | Last episode: November 13, 2024 with Jang Do-yeon, Lee Joon, Im Woo-il, Lee Seung-hoon, and Park Young-jin | |
| 2025 | I am Boxer | Host | Season 1 Last episode: January 22, 2026 with Ma Dong Seok and Dex | |
| 2026 | King of Survival 2 | Host | Premiering in first half of 2026 on Netflix Korean team: Kim Jong Kook (Host), Kim Byung Man, Yook Jun Seo, Kim Young Hoon The Boyz | |
| 2026 | SBS Plus' The Travel Method of Real Men | Host | Premiering in April 2026 Kim Jong Kook, Yoshihiro Akiyama | |

=== Web shows ===
| Year | Title | Role | Notes | Ref. |
|---|---|---|---|---|
| 2017–2019 | Big Picture | Main cast | with Haha | |
| 2021 | Outrun by Running Man | Cast member | Running Man spin-off | |

=== Direct-to-video series ===
| Year | Title | Role | Notes |
|---|---|---|---|
| 2006 | Paris by Night 81 | Performer (Performed "To Her Man") | Vietnamese-language variety show in Long Beach, California, U.S. |

=== Hosting ===
| Year | Title | Notes | Ref. |
|---|---|---|---|
| 2018 | Gaon Chart Music Awards | With Nancy | |
| 2018 | SBS Entertainment Awards | With Park Soo-hong and Han Go-eun | |
| 2021 | APAN Music Awards | With Jeon So-min | |

== Awards and nominations ==
Name of the award ceremony, year presented, category, nominee of the award, and the result of the nomination
| Award ceremony | Year | Category | Nominee(s) / Work(s) | Result | Ref. |
|---|---|---|---|---|---|
| Asian Model Awards | 2008 | BBF Popular Singer Award | Kim Jong-kook | Won | |
| Baeksang Arts Awards | 2023 | Best Male Variety Performer | Gym Jong Kook, Running Man, and My Little Old Boy | Won | |
| Brand of the Year Awards | 2022 | Celebrity YouTuber of the Year | Kim Jong-kook | Nominated | |
| Brand Customer Loyalty Award | 2021 | Multitainer – Male | Kim Jong-kook | Won | |
| DramaFever Awards | 2016 | Best Bromance | Kim Jong-kook (with Lee Kwang-soo); Running Man | Won | |
| Golden Disk Awards | 2004 | Popularity Award | Kim Jong-kook | Won | |
| Golden Disk Awards | 2005 | Bonsang Award | Kim Jong-kook | Won | |
| Golden Disk Awards | 2006 | Bonsang Award | Kim Jong-kook | Won | |
| KBS Entertainment Awards | 2005 | Best Entertainer Award | Shootdori | Won | |
| KBS Entertainment Awards | 2013 | Best Entertainer Award | Escape Crisis No. 1 | Won | |
| KBS Music Awards | 2004 | Bonsang Award | Kim Jong-kook | Won | |
| KBS Music Awards | 2005 | Grand Prize (Daesang) – Best Artist | Kim Jong-kook | Won | |
| Korean Entertainer Awards | 2005 | Ballad Award | Kim Jong-kook | Won | |
| Korean Broadcasting Awards | 2021 | Popularity Award | Running Man | Nominated | |
| Korean Popular Culture and Arts Awards | 2015 | Prime Minister's Award | Kim Jong-kook | Won | |
| KU Music Asian Music Awards | 2016 | Asia's Most Focused Artist Award | Kim Jong-kook | Won | |
| MBC Best 10 Music Awards | 2004 | Bonsang Award | Kim Jong-kook | Won | |
| MBC Music Awards | 2005 | Most Popular Singer | "Lovable" | Won | |
| MBC Music Awards | 2005 | Grand Prize (Daesang) – Best Artist | "Lovable" | Won | |
| Melon Music Awards | 2006 | Album Of The Year | Volume 4 - Kim Jong Kook's Fourth Letter | Won | |
| Mnet Asian Music Awards | 2005 | Best Male Artist | "Standstill" | Won | |
| Mnet Asian Music Awards | 2005 | Best Ballad Performance | "Standstill" | Nominated | |
| Mnet Asian Music Awards | 2009 | Best Ballad Performance | "Today More Than Yesterday" | Nominated | |
| SBS Entertainment Awards | 2010 | Best TV Star Award | Running Man | Won | |
| SBS Entertainment Awards | 2011 | Excellence Award (Variety Category) | Running Man | Won | |
| SBS Entertainment Awards | 2011 | Netizen Popularity Award | Running Man | Nominated | |
| SBS Entertainment Awards | 2013 | Excellence Award (Male) | Running Man | Won | |
| SBS Entertainment Awards | 2013 | Viewers Choice Popularity Award | Running Man | Won | |
| SBS Entertainment Awards | 2014 | High Excellence Award | Running Man | Won | |
| SBS Entertainment Awards | 2014 | Sohu China Netizen Popularity Award | Running Man | Won | |
| SBS Entertainment Awards | 2015 | Sohu China Netizen Popularity Award | Running Man | Won | |
| SBS Entertainment Awards | 2018 | PD's Award | Running Man and My Little Old Boy | Won | |
| SBS Entertainment Awards | 2018 | Best Couple Award | Kim Jong-kook (with Hong Jin-young); Running Man and My Little Old Boy | Won | |
| SBS Entertainment Awards | 2019 | Top Excellence Award in Reality Category | Running Man and My Little Old Boy | Won | |
| SBS Entertainment Awards | 2019 | Grand Prize (Daesang) | Running Man and My Little Old Boy | Nominated | |
| SBS Entertainment Awards | 2020 | Golden Content Award | with Running Man members | Won | |
| SBS Entertainment Awards | 2020 | Grand Prize (Daesang) | Running Man and My Little Old Boy | Won | |
| SBS Entertainment Awards | 2021 | Grand Prize (Daesang) | with My Little Old Boy members | Won | |
| SBS Entertainment Awards | 2021 | Entertainer of the Year Award | Running Man and My Little Old Boy | Won | |
| SBS Entertainment Awards | 2022 | Best Couple Award | Kim Jong-kook (with Yoo Jae-suk) | Won | |
| SBS Entertainment Awards | 2022 | Grand Prize (Daesang) | Running Man and My Little Old Boy | Nominated | |
| SBS Entertainment Awards | 2023 | Award for Short Clip with Highest Views | Running Man and My Little Old Boy | Won | |
| SBS Entertainment Awards | 2023 | Grand Prize (Daesang) | Running Man and My Little Old Boy | Nominated | |
| SBS Entertainment Awards | 2024 | The Most Short Clip Views Award | Running Man and My Little Old Boy | Won | |
| SBS Entertainment Awards | 2024 | Good Partner Award | with My Little Old Boy members | Won | |
| SBS Music Awards | 2004 | Bonsang Award | Kim Jong-kook | Won | |
| SBS Music Awards | 2005 | Grand Prize (Daesang) – Best Artist | "Loveable" | Won | |
| SBS Visual Arts Award | 2005 | Photogenic Award | Kim Jong-kook | Won | |
| Seoul Music Awards | 2004 | Bonsang Award | Kim Jong-kook | Won | |
| Seoul Music Awards | 2008 | Bonsang Award | Kim Jong-kook | Won | |
| Yahoo! Asia Buzz Awards | 2013 | Asia's Most Charismatic Korean Host | Kim Jong-kook | Won | |

== Notes ==
Awards and achievements
| Preceded by Shinhwa | SBS Gayo Daejun Award - Daesang Award; 2005 | Succeeded by TVXQ |
| Preceded by Rain | KBS Music Award - Daesang Award; 2005 | Succeeded by Discontinued |
| Preceded by Yoo Jae-suk | SBS Entertainment Awards - Daesang Award; 2020 | Succeeded by |
