= Crazy Recipe Adventure =

South Korean variety show

- Promotional poster
- Hangul: 볼빨간 신선놀음
- Hanja: 볼빨간 神仙놀음
- RR: Bolppalgan sinseonnoreum
- MR: Polppalgan sinsŏnnorŭm
- Genre: Cooking show; Variety show; Comedy
- Created by: Yeo Woon Hyuk
- Starring: Kim Jong-kook; Haha; Seo Jang-hoon; Sung Si Kyung
- Country of origin: South Korea
- Original language: Korean
- No. of episodes: 20 + 2 Pilot

Production
- Production location: South Korea
- Camera setup: Multi-camera setup
- Running time: ~65 minutes

Original release
- Network: MBC TV
- Release: January 15 – June 4, 2021

Crazy Recipe Adventure (Korean: 볼빨간 신선놀음) was a South Korean cooking-variety show on MBC. It aired on MBC starting from January 15, 2021 on Fridays at 20:45 (KST). (Note: Previously aired at 21:45 (KST)) The show aired two pilot episodes as an MBC Chuseok special in 2020. The final episode was broadcast on June 4, 2021.

== Format ==
Each episode consists of a Korean food theme. Guests will then cook their own recipes which will be presented anonymously to the cast in the order the guest chooses. If the cast member likes the dish, a golden axe is shown and the dish can be tasted by the next person. However if the cast member dislikes the dish, a toad is shown and the dish is eliminated preventing the next person from tasting it. If the cast unanimously approves of the dish the guest will receive an 11.25 gram pure gold axe.

== Production ==
On August 21, 2020, South Korean entertainment company Mystic Story announced a new pilot called Crazy Noodle Recipe (Korean: 볼 빨간 라면 연구소) directed by Yoo Woon-hyuk and airing on MBC. The show starred Kim Jong-kook, Haha, Seo Jang-hoon, Sung Si-kyung and Ham Yeon-ji. The format of the show consisted of the cast visiting people who claimed to have a unique ramen recipe, watching them cook, then eating and judging their recipe. If the cast unanimously approves the dish, the contestant is awarded $1000 USD to help further develop their recipe. The show was broadcast in two parts by MBC as a Chuseok special on September 29 and 30 with favourable support from the viewers.

On December 28, 2020, MBC confirmed that the show was approved for regular broadcasting but would go through a format overhaul. The show was renamed to Crazy Recipe Adventure (Korean: 볼빨간 신선놀음) and the format was changed to a cooking contest with a different food theme each episode. The original cast would also return with the exception of Ham Yeon-ji. The first episode aired on January 15, 2021.

The show was cancelled by MBC in May 2021 due to poor viewer ratings. The final episode aired on June 4, 2021.

== Episodes ==
– Golden Axe (Won)
– Toad (Lost)

=== (2021) ===
List of episodes (episode 1–20)

Episode (Broadcast Date)	Special Guest	Theme	Participants (in order)					
1 (January 15, 2021)	Matthew	Ramen	Song Ji-ah	Kim Jin-woo	Kim Yeon-jeong; Kim Eun-jin	Kim Seung-min	Yoyomi	Park So-eun
2 (January 22, 2021)	Matthew	Ramen	Song Yun-hyeong (iKon)	Ralral	Chae Nak-young	Ji Seok-yoon	Park Ji-hye	Kim Do-hyeong; Kim Gyeong-rok
3 (January 29, 2021)	Lee Myung-hoon	Kimchi	Yoo Gwi-yeol	Kim Seung-min	Julie	Park Ji-hye	Lim Jae-seon	Song Ji-ah
4 (February 5, 2021)	Lee Myung-hoon	Kimchi	Yoon Chul	Shin In-ho	Soya	Lucky	Yoon Ji-sung	Cha Hun; Yoo Hwe-seung (N.Flying)
5 (February 12, 2021)	Yoo Min-sang	Chicken	Ttukttak	Yuk Tae-seon	Hong Shin-ae	Lee Know; Hyunjin (Stray Kids)	Lee Woo-chul	
6 (February 19, 2021)	Yoo Min-sang	Chicken	Kim Young-man	Chae Nak-young	Kim Geon-hoon	Song Ji-ah	Ko Su-jeong	
7 (February 26, 2021)	Changmin (TVXQ)	Homemade Meal	Changmin (TVXQ)	Kim Seung-min	Park Joon-woo			
8 (March 5, 2021)	Changmin (TVXQ)	Homemade Meal	Yeo Kyung-rae	Yoo Hee-young	Hong Shin-ae	Seo Ho-young		
9 (March 12, 2021)	Changmin (TVXQ)	Homemade Meal	Jung Ji-sun	Tony Oh	Chou Peian	Chae Nak-young		
10 (March 19, 2021)	Lee Sang-hwa	Canned Tuna	Lee Sang-hwa	Yang Jung-won	Kim Hye-sun	Kim Seung-hyun		
11 (March 26, 2021)	Lee Sang-hwa	Canned Tuna	Lim Dong-kyu	Mo Tae-bum	Roh Ji-sun (Fromis 9)	BM (Kard)	Moon Seok-ki	
12 (April 2, 2021)	Paeng Hyun-sook	Test Kitchen	Lee Yoon-seo; Lee Eun-seo	Jang Geum	Jeon Sung-gu; Lee Mi-yeon			
13 (April 9, 2021)	Paeng Hyun-sook	Test Kitchen	Jung Jin-ju	Lee Joon-beom	Yoon Jung-min	Oh Sang-jun		
14 (April 16, 2021)	Swings	Test Kitchen	Park Hyo-jun	Kim Han-eol	Oh Hyun-seok	Choo Hye-jung		
15 (April 23, 2021)	Swings	Test Kitchen	Kim Jin-kyung	Kim Doo-young	Lim Do-ah	Seo Hyung-in		
16 (April 30, 2021)	Tzuyang (YouTuber)	Fusion Noodles	Kim Jun-ki	Kang Dong-woo; Yeom Hye-ji	Nam Sang-Ho	Nam Joon-young		
17 (May 7, 2021)	Yang Ji Eun	Ox Meat	Choi Ki-chan	Park Geun-young	Jung Ho-kyun			
18 (May 14, 2021)	Hyojung (Oh My Girl)	Ox Meat	Yuk Kyung-hee	Kim Hoon	Kim Kang-sir			
19 (May 28, 2021)	Lee Hong-gi (F.T. Island)	Baked Goods	Yeo Dae-ryun	Ham Jae-sung	Baek Sung-soo			
20 (June 4, 2021)	N/A	Hanwoo	Jeong Hyeong-ga					

== Ratings ==
– Highest rating
– Lowest rating
(N.R. - No rating)

=== (2021) ===
List of ratings (episode 1–20)

Ep. #	Original Airdate	Nielsen Korea Ratings Nationwide	
Ep. #	Original Airdate	Part 1	Part 2
1	January 15	1.6%	1.6%
2	January 22	1.5%	2.0%
3	January 29	2.1%	2.5%
4	February 5	1.5%	1.7%
5	February 12	N.R.	2.6%
6	February 19	1.8%	1.8%
7	February 26	1.6%	1.8%
8	March 5	2.0%	2.3%
9	March 12	1.7%	2.0%
10	March 19	2.4%	2.4%
11	March 26	1.7%	1.9%
12	April 2	1.6%	1.7%
13	April 9	1.4%	1.4%
14	April 16	1.5%	1.3%
15	April 23	1.7%	1.7%
16	April 30	1.5%	1.9%
17	May 7	2.1%	2.4%
18	May 14	1.1%	1.6%
19	May 28	1.9%	1.7%
20	June 4	1.0%	1.3%
