= Lee Myung-hoon =

South Korean actor and comedian

- Born: February 2, 1989 (age 37); Seoul, South Korea
- Occupations: Actor; comedian
- Years active: 2012–present
- Agent: Family Entertainment

Korean name
- Hangul: 이명훈
- RR: I Myeonghun
- MR: I Myŏnghun
- Website: familyent.net

Lee Myung-hoon (Korean: 이명훈; born February 2, 1989) is a South Korean actor and comedian.

== Filmography ==
=== Television series ===
Year	Network	Title	Notes
2014	SBS	You're Only Mine	Go Eun-shan
2014		Access 2014	Himself (Ep.3)
2015	KBS	In Still Green Days	Yoo Sang-min
2016	tvN	Drinking Solo	High school schoolmate (cameo)
2017	MBC	The Rebel	Hong Eob-san
2017	tvN	Circles	Section Chief Go (Ep.8)
2017	KBS	Strongest Deliveryman	Department Head Park (Support Role)
2017	KBS2	Revolutionary Love	Byun Hyuk's friend (guest)
2017		Absolutely Perfect Man	완전 역 (Web Drama)
2018	SBS	Ms. Ma, Nemesis	Heo Joo Yeong
2023	MBN	Perfect Marriage Revenge	Byeon jae ho

=== Variety show ===
Year	Title	Notes/Ref.
2016	Saturday Night Live Korea	Season 8: Ep. 1-17
2018	Baek Jong-won's Alley Restaurant	Episodes 13–15
2021	Crazy Recipe Adventure	Host
2022	Day to Eat Out	Host with Kim Jun-hyun
