= Fly Shoot Dori =

South Korean television show

- Promotional Poster
- Hangul: 날아라 슛돌이
- RR: Narara syutdori
- MR: Narara syuttori
- Genre: Reality; Variety
- Country of origin: South Korea
- Original language: Korean
- No. of seasons: 7

Production
- Production location: South Korea
- Running time: 65 minutes

Original release
- Network: KBS
- Release: October 23, 2005 – July 13, 2020

Fly Shoot Dori (Korean: 날아라 슛돌이) is a South Korean reality show program on KBS. The 1st League of the show used to be one of the Happy Sunday segment and was aired on KBS2. From 2nd to the 6th League, they were aired on KBS N SPORTS.

In December 2019, it was announced that a new season was in the making. The new season aired on Tuesdays at 20:55 (KST) from January 7, 2020 to July 13, 2020 on KBS2.

== Synopsis ==
This show showcases young children with varying soccer skills. Through the show, they will be able to get to know each other and learn how to play soccer from the coaches.

== Casts ==
=== 1st League ===
Air Date

October 23, 2005 – July 30, 2006

- Director: Kim Jong-kook, Jun Jin
- Coach: Shin Jung-hwan, Kim Jong-min
- Manager: Lee Yeon-doo

Player

- Jo Min-ho (조민호)
- Lee Hyun-jun (이현준) (Left the show in December 2005)
- Kim Tae-soo (김태수)
- Kim Tae-hoon (김태훈) (Appearance from Ep 3 onwards)
- Oh Ji-woo (오지우)
- Choi Seong-woo (최성우)
- Ji Seung-jun (지승준) - Captain and Goal Keeper
- Lee Seung-gwon (이승권)
- Jin Hyun-woo (진현우)

=== Shooter dream team ===
Air Date

July 2, 2006 – August 27, 2006

- Director: Yoo Sang-chul
- Coach: Kim Jong-min
- Manager: Shin Ji

Player

- Jo Min-ho (조민호)
- Kim Tae-hoon (김태훈)
- Kim Tae-soo (김태수)
- Ju Hwi-min (주휘민)
- Jo Hyeong-ho (조형호)
- Im Won-jun (임원준)
- Seung Jun-soo (승준수)

=== 2nd League ===
Air Date

September 10 – November 12, 2006

- Director : Yoo Sang-chul, Kim Tae-young
- Coach : Lee Jae-hoon
- Manager : Jeon Hye-sang

Player

- Maeng Ho-seong (맹호성)
- Choi Seong-woo (최성우)
- Kim San (김산)
- Lee Seung-gwon (이승권)
- Kim Jeong-in (김정인)
- Choi Yoo-bin (최유빈)
- Lee Tae-seok (이태석)
- Choi Chan-uk (최찬욱)
- Park Geon (박건)

=== 3rd League ===
Air Date

April 2 – October 29, 2007

- Director: Yoo Sang-chul
- Coach: Lee Jung
- Manager: Sim Min

Player

- Lee Kang-in (이강인)
- Kim San (김산)
- Kim Seong-min (김성민)
- Shin Jae-yoo (신재유)
- Lee Dong-hwa (이동화)
- Kim Seung-jun (김승준)
- Seo Yo-sep (서요셉)
- Oh Woo-bin (오우빈)
- Lee Tae-seok (이태석)
- Kim Yoo-rim (김유림)

=== 4th League ===
Air Date

March 8 – September, 2008

- Director: Yoo Sang-chul
- Coach: Kim Byung-man, Lee Jung
- Manager: Nam Bo-ra

Player

- Oh Woo-bin (오우빈)
- Lee Tae-seok (이태석)
- Kim Dae-hyun (김대현)
- Kim Dong-geon (김동건)
- Kim San (김산)
- Go Ga-hyun (고가현)
- Kim Jin-won (김진원)
- Park Edward (박에드워드)
- Byeon Jun-seok (변준석)
- Kim Dong-seong (김동성)

=== 5th League ===
Air Date

March 7 – September 12, 2009

- Director: Yoo Sang-chul
- Coach: Woo Seung-min
- Manager: Choi Seung-ah

Player

- Jo Seong-bin (조성빈)
- Tia Johnson (티아존슨)
- Shin Hyung-kyun (신형균)
- Jo Yong-jin (조용진)
- Jeong Ui-hyun (정의현)
- Shin Jae-hoon (신재훈)
- Im Kyung-bin (임경빈)
- Kim Ji-hoon (김지훈)
- Park Min-kyu (박민규)
- Kim Ju-heon (김주헌)

=== 6th League ===
Air Date

May 5 – July 21, 2014

- Director: Lee Jung
- Coach: Lee Chang-min
- Manager: Shin Soo-ji

Player

- Lee Hyo-rin (이효린)
- Yang Seo-hyun (양서현)
- Kim Woo-jin (김우진)
- Kim Do-yoon (김도윤)
- Lee Ha-rang (이하랑)
- Kim Hae-mil (김해밀)
- David Yanson (데이빗얀슨)
- Jeong Tae-ha (정태하)
- Chun Kwan-hwi (천관희)
- Lee Si-on (이시온)

=== 7th League — New Beginning ===
Air Date

January 7 – July 13, 2020

- Due to the outbreak of COVID-19, therefore from March 24 to May 5, 2020 and June 2, 2020, recording of the show had been temporarily suspended. Thus, for the time being, broadcasts in the coming weeks will be replaced by either special or rerun episodes of 'Fly Shoot Dori'.

Casts

- Kim Jong-kook: Coach
- Yang Se-chan: Coach
- Lee Byung-jin: Castor
- Park Moon-sung: Commentator
- Lee Young-pyo: Director

One Day Coach

- Kim So-hye (Ep 3–4)
- Alberto Mondi (Ep 6-9)

One Day Director

- Lee Dong-gook (Ep 1–2, 4–6)
- Park Joo-ho (Ep 3–4)
- Kim Jae-hwan (Ep 6–7)
- Alberto Mondi (Ep 6–9)
- Ahn Jung-hwan (Ep 10–11)

Players

- Lee Jeong-won (이정원)
- Jeon Ha-gyeom (전하겸)
- Lee Woo-jong (이우종)
- Byeon Ji-hoon (변지훈)
- Lee Kyung-ju (이경주)
- Kim Ji-won (김지원)
- Park Seo-jin (박서진)

== Rating ==
- In the ratings below, the highest rating for the show will be in red, and the lowest rating for the show will be in blue each year.
- Ratings listed below are the individual corner ratings of Fly Shoot Dori. (Note: Individual corner ratings do not include commercial time, which regular ratings include.)

=== League 7 ===
Ep. #	Original Airdate	Nielsen Ratings
Ep. #	Original Airdate	Nationwide
1	January 7, 2020	3.4%
2	January 16, 2020	2.7%
3	January 21, 2020	2.9%
4	January 29, 2020	2.5%
5	February 4, 2020	2.1%
6	February 11, 2020	2.5%
7	February 18. 2020	2.2%
8	February 25, 2020	2.2%
9	March 3, 2020	2.7%
10	March 10, 2020	2.8%
11	March 17, 2020	2.9%
Special 1	March 24, 2020	2.3%
Special 2	April 14, 2020	2.1%
12	May 12, 2020	2.2%
13	May 19, 2020	2.5%
14	May 26, 2020	2.5%
15	June 9, 2020	1.9%
16	June 23, 2020	1.9%
17	June 29, 2020	2.2%
18	July 6, 2020	2.4%
19	July 13, 2020	2.1%
