= This Is Me (Kim Jong-kook album) =

Studio album by Kim Jong-kook
- Released: June 24, 2005
- Recorded: 2005
- Genre: K-pop
- Length: 57:21
- Label: Queen Entertainment

Kim Jong-kook chronology
Evolution (2004)	This Is Me (2005)	Fourth Letter (2006)

Singles from This Is Me
- 1. "Standstill"; 2. "Loveable"

This Is Me is the third studio album by South Korean singer and actor Kim Jong-kook. It was first made available on June 24, 2005, (Note: Some sources say July 1, 2005, however, MIAK charts listed the release date as June 24 and it charted on the June monthly chart.) and spawned the lead tracks "Standstill" and "Loveable". The album experienced commercial success in South Korea upon its release, topping the monthly MIAK album chart and selling over 243,000 copies by the end of the year, ranking as the second best-selling album in the country in 2005.

== Overview ==
After releasing his second studio album Evolution in 2004, Kim achieved mainstream success in South Korea and found recognition with his song "One Man". The following year, it was confirmed that Kim's third studio album, This Is Me, would contain 15 tracks with various genres. Its lead single, titled "Standstill", was described as a lyrical extension of "One Man", revolving around the story of a man who is not able to let go of an old lover and stays in the same place of mind. A medium-tempo R&B number, it exhibits a more upbeat melody in comparison with its predecessor. Its accompanying beach-themed music video was filmed on Boracay Island in the Philippines and was broadcast through various music channels in South Korea upon the album's release.

Composed by Jo Young-soo, the tracks "To Her Man" and "Eraser" similarly details the emotions of parting with a lover, adding depth to Kim's unique higher pitched tone. The Latin-inspired tracks "Saturday Night" and "One Night" were noted for its 80s and 90s disco-styles, while "Gift" was characterized for evoking a sense of comfort in listeners. After the release of "Standstill", Kim found difficulty in choosing a track that could potentially serve as a sequel, letting his fans vote instead. Kim eventually chose the song "Loveable" as the follow-up single in late-August after reflecting the opinions of his fans. Its music video was subsequently shot in Yongin on August 26, 2005, with promotions beginning in early September.

== Commercial performance ==
Commercially, This Is Me experienced commercial success in South Korea. The album achieved the number one spot on the monthly MIAK albums chart for June 2005, selling 62,843 within a week. It descended eight positions to number nine and sold an additional 20,713 copies the following month. The particularly positive reception for the follow-up single "Loveable" in late-August led to record sales following the song's release with 2,000 to 3,000 copies being sold per day, leading the album to reclaim the number one position for the month of August on the MIAK chart. By the end of the year, the album sold a total of 243,211 copies, making it the second best-selling album in the country during 2005, ranking behind only SG Wannabe's Saldaga. It went on to sell over 303,000 copies in the country by June 2006.

== Accolades ==
Awards and nominations
Year	Organization	Title	Nominee	Result	Ref.
2005	Mnet Km Music Video Festival	Best Male Artist	"Standstill"	Won	
2005	Mnet Km Music Video Festival	Best Ballad Performance	"Standstill"	Nominated	
2005	MBC Music Awards	Most Popular Singer	"Loveable"	Won	
2005	MBC Music Awards	Grand Prize (Daesang) – Best Artist	"Loveable"	Won	
2005	SBS Music Awards	Grand Prize (Daesang) – Best Artist	"Loveable"	Won	

Music program awards
Song	Program	Date
"Standstill"	Music Camp	July 30, 2005
"Standstill"	M Countdown	August 4, 2005
"Standstill"	Inkigayo	August 7, 2005
"Standstill"	Inkigayo	August 14, 2005
"Standstill"	Inkigayo	August 21, 2005
"Loveable"	Inkigayo	September 11, 2005
"Loveable"	Inkigayo	September 25, 2005
"Loveable"	Inkigayo	October 2, 2005

== Track listing ==
This Is Me track listing
No.	Title	Length
1.	"Standstill" (제자리 걸음; Jejari Georeum)	3:38
2.	"To Her Man" (그녀의 남자에게; Geunyeoui Namjaege)	4:33
3.	"Sad Congratulations" (슬픈 축하; Seulpeun Chugha)	4:07
4.	"Gift" (선물; Seonmul)	4:31
5.	"Happiness"	0:16
6.	"Loveable" (사랑스러워; Salangseuleowo)	4:41
7.	"Eraser" (지우개; Jiugae)	4:00
8.	"Dream"	3:50
9.	"Saturday Night" (토요일 밤; Toyoil Bam)	3:31
10.	"Star, Wind, Sunlight and Love" (별, 바람, 햇살 그리고 사랑; Byeol, Baram, Haessal Geurigo Sarang)	4:27
11.	"One Night"	3:37
12.	"To My Friend" (친구에게; Chinguege)	4:46
13.	"I'm a Fool" (바보 같은 나; Babo Gateun Na)	4:23
14.	"Practice" (연습; Yeonseu)	3:24
15.	"Still" (여전히; Yeojeonhi)	3:29
Total length:		57:21

== Charts ==
=== Monthly charts ===
Chart (2005)	Peak position
South Korean Albums (MIAK)	1

=== Yearly charts ===
Chart (2005)	Peak position
South Korean Albums (MIAK)	2
