= Mighty Mouth =

South Korean hip hop duo

Mighty Mouth 마이티 마우스
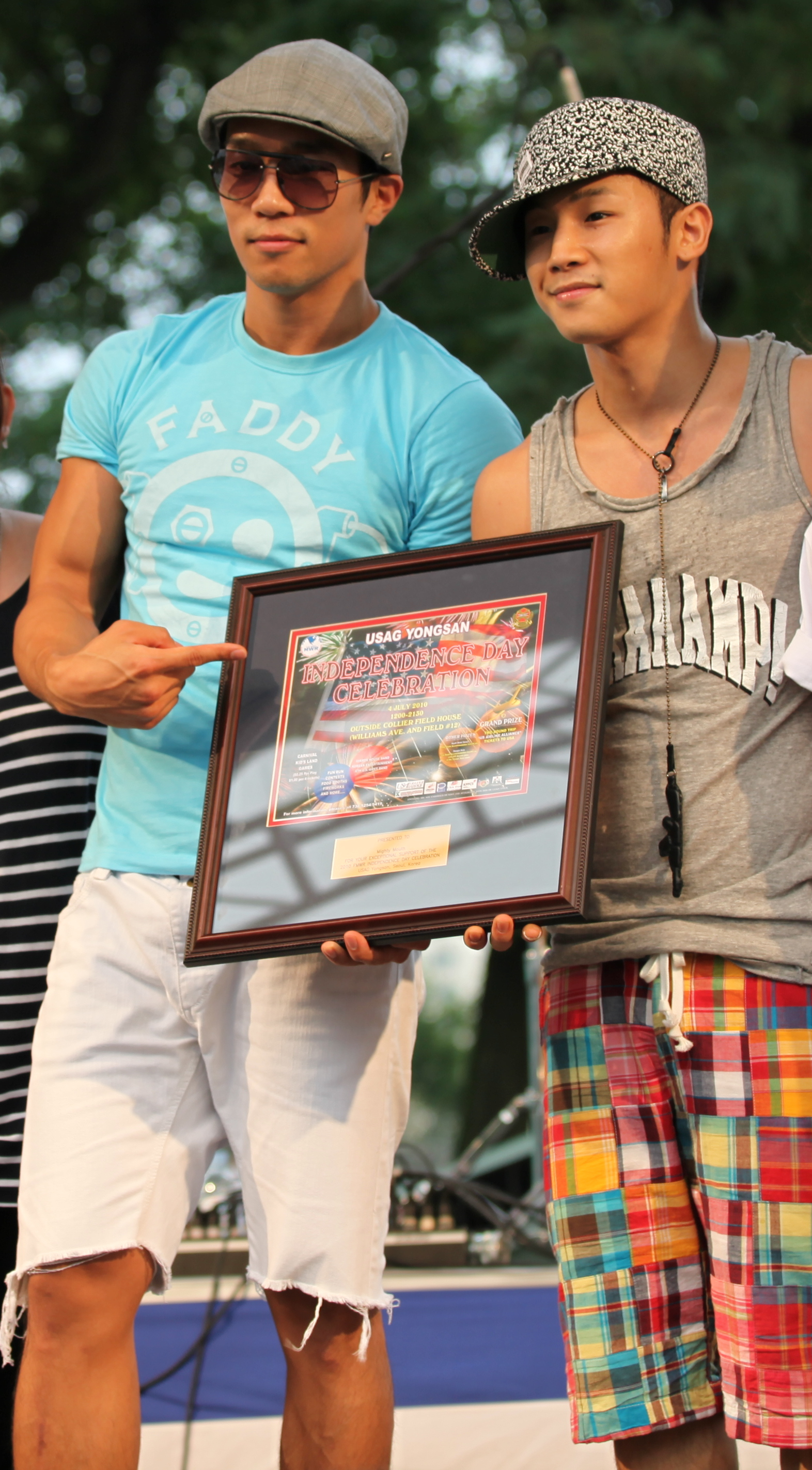
- Mighty Mouth in 2010

Background information
- Origin: Seoul, South Korea
- Genres: Hip Hop, Pop
- Years active: 2008–present
- Labels: 101 Entertainment; YMC Entertainment; Allmighty Records (present); BPM Entertainment
- Members: Sangchu; Shorry J
- Website: mightymouth.co.kr

Mighty Mouth (Korean: 마이티 마우스) is a South Korean duet male group made up of Sangchu (Korean: 상추) and Shorry J (Korean: 쇼리 J). Debuted in 2008 with their Energy album featuring Yoon Eun Hye for "I love you", Sunye of Wonder Girls for "Energy" and Son Dambi for "Family".

On January 18, 2011, Mighty Mouth released Tok Tok as part of their album Mighty Fresh. This was the first of many songs featuring Soya.

On 30 October 2012, Sang-chu enlisted for mandatory military service for five weeks of basic training followed by 21 months as an active-duty soldier with the 306th draft in Uijeongbu, Gyeonggi Province, where he served along with Super Junior's leader Leeteuk until his discharge on 8 Aug 2014.

In April 2016, the duo launched their own agency Allmighty Records.

== Members ==
- Sangchu (상추)
- Shorry J (쇼리 J)

== Acting ==
In 2012, Sangchu had a cameo role as a 'muscle boy' student in the K-drama To the Beautiful You, in a bathroom scene with the lead role played by Sulli who was disguised as a boy.

In 2014, Shorry J had his first acting role in a K-drama, Triangle, as a gang member and friend of the lead role played by Kim Jae-joong. In April 2016, he portrayed a skilled pickpocket in the historical K-drama The Flower in Prison.

== Discography ==
=== Studio albums ===
Title	Album details	Peak chart positions	Sales
Title	Album details	KOR	Sales
Energy	Released: June 19, 2008; Label: 101 Entertainment; Formats: CD	23	KOR: 5,170
Mighty Fresh	Released: January 18, 2011; Label: 101 Entertainment; Formats: CD, digital download	29	KOR: 908

=== Extended plays ===
Title	Album details	Peak chart positions	Sales
Title	Album details	KOR	Sales
Love Class	Released: August 6, 2009; Label: 101 Entertainment; Formats: CD, digital download	—N/a	—N/a
Data not available for 2009

=== Singles ===
Title	Year	Peak chart positions	Album
Title	Year	KOR	Album
As lead artist
"I Love You" (사랑해) feat. Yoon Eun-hye	2008	—N/a	Energy
"Energy" (에너지) feat. Sunye	2008	—N/a	Energy
"Family" (패밀리) feat. Son Dam-bi	2008	—N/a	Non-album single
"Love Class" (연애특강) feat. Han Ye-seul	2009	—N/a	Love Class
"Smile" (웃어) feat. Insooni	2009	—N/a	Mighty Fresh
"Love Is" (사랑이란) feat. Kim Hee-sun	2010	17	Mighty Fresh
"Tok Tok" (톡톡) feat. Soya	2011	4	Mighty Fresh
"Tok Tok" (톡톡) (Original version) feat. Kim Bum-soo	2011	52	Mighty Fresh
"Lalala" (랄랄라) feat. Soya	2011	12	Non-album singles
"Bad Boy" (나쁜놈) feat. Soya	2012	8	Non-album singles
"My Heart Is Broken" (뿌러졌어) feat. Lim Yoon-taek of Ulala Session, Soul King	2012	35	Navigation single album
"At Times Like These" (이럴때면) feat. Lyn	2012	13	Navigation single album
"Good-Bye" feat. Soya	2012	29	Non-album singles
"Nice 2 Meet U" (prod. by Zico) feat. Soya	2016	64	Non-album singles
"Sugar Sugar" feat. Chancellor	2016	—	Non-album singles
"Instagram"	2017	—	Non-album singles
"Uber"	2018	—	Non-album singles
"Pretty Girl" (예쁜여자) feat. Bomi of Apink	2018	—	Non-album singles
"Laser Beam" (레이져 빔) feat. Jo Hyun-young	2018	—	Non-album singles
"Temperature" (온도) feat. Park Hyun-seo	2019	—	Non-album singles
"Irene"	2019	—	Non-album singles
"Love Issue" feat. Aki	2019	—	Non-album singles
"Slam Dunk" feat. Eunha	2023	—	Non-album singles
Collaborations
"Will Love Come?" (사랑이 올까요) with Baek Ji-young	2010	4	Non-album singles
"Super Hero" with Shinsadong Tiger	2011	89	Non-album singles
"—" denotes release did not chart.

== Awards ==
Seoul Music Awards - Newcomer Award (2009)

=== Mnet Asian Music Awards ===
Year	Category	Work	Result
2008	Best New Male Artist	"I Love You" ft. JJ	Nominated
2008	Best Hip Hop Performance	"I Love You" ft. JJ	Nominated
2011	Best Rap Performance	"Tok Tok"	Nominated
