= Chi-young Kim =

Korean English literary translator

- Hangul: 김지영
- RR: Gim Jiyeong
- MR: Kim Chiyŏng

Chi-young Kim is a Korean-to-English literary translator who lives in the United States.

Originally having trained as a lawyer and translating as a hobby helping her mom, Kim became a professional literary translator after graduation, when she started working for a publishing company in New York. Her work includes the English translations of the award-winning novels Please Look After Mom by Shin Kyung-sook and The Hen Who Dreamed She Could Fly by Hwang Seon-mi. Her translation of Whale by Cheon Myeong-kwan was shortlisted for the 2023 International Booker Prize. In 2024, her English translation of Apartment Women by Gu Byeong-mo was released.

Other internationally acclaimed translated works are Your Republic Is Calling You by Kim Young-ha or The Investigation by Lee Jung-myung.

== Sources ==
- Translator Behind Int'l Success of Korean Novels, profile in The Chosun Ilbo, 21 May 2014.
- https://web.archive.org/web/20140524023257/http://www.englishpen.org/capturing-the-mood/
