= Pierre-Alain Giraud =

French film director and immersive artist

- Born: 1982 (age 43–44)
- Education: Arts et Métiers ParisTech; London Film School
- Occupations: Film director, film editor, immersive artist
- Years active: 2009–present
- Known for: Colored (Noire), Playing with Fire
- Website: pierrealaingiraud.com

Pierre-Alain Giraud (born 1982) is a French film director, editor and creator of immersive works, and a co-founder of the Paris-based production company Novaya. With Stéphane Foenkinos he co-directed Colored (Noire), an augmented reality adaptation of Tania de Montaigne's essay on Claudette Colvin, which received the first Award for Best Immersive Work at the 2024 Cannes Film Festival and the inaugural Annwn Prize in 2026. He wrote and directed Playing with Fire: An Immersive Odyssey with Yuja Wang, a mixed reality concert experience with the pianist Yuja Wang that opened at the Philharmonie de Paris in 2025 and was selected for the Immersive Competition of the 2026 Cannes Film Festival. He also co-directed, with the artist Gabríela Friðriksdóttir, the animated video for Björk's "Victimhood" (2023).

== Early life and education ==
Giraud trained as an engineer before turning to cinema. He graduated from Arts et Métiers ParisTech and holds a master's degree in directing from the London Film School, where he made the short film A Portrait of You (2009).

== Career ==
=== Iceland and Bedroom Community ===
After film school, Giraud settled for a time in Iceland, where he worked with musicians of the Reykjavík label Bedroom Community. He directed the animated video for "Winter Sleep" by Valgeir Sigurðsson and Dawn McCarthy (2009), and followed Ben Frost, Sigurðsson, Nico Muhly and Sam Amidon on the label's 2010 European tour to make the documentary feature Everything, Everywhere, All the Time (2011). He also created the visuals for Sigurðsson's chamber opera Wide Slumber for Lepidopterists (2014).

=== Editing ===
As an editor, Giraud worked on the documentaries La Reine s'évade (2010) and Brochet comme le poisson (2013) by the actress Anne Brochet, Les Enfants des mille jours (2013) by Jaco Bidermann and Claudia Soto Mansilla, and Antoine Viviani's interactive documentary In Limbo (2015), co-produced by Arte and the National Film Board of Canada and presented at IDFA.

=== Theatre and stage films ===
Since 2016 Giraud has collaborated regularly with the stage director Arthur Nauzyciel. He directed the films for Nauzyciel's L'Empire des lumières, an adaptation of Kim Young-ha's novel Your Republic Is Calling You created at the National Theater of Korea in Seoul with Moon So-ri in the lead role and later presented at the MC93 in Bobigny. From this material he made a short film, L'Empire des lumières (2019), selected in the Cinema of Tomorrow competition of the Cairo International Film Festival. For Nauzyciel's 2018 production of La Dame aux Camélias at the Théâtre National de Bretagne, he co-wrote the adaptation with Valérie Mréjen and directed the films projected on stage. He subsequently created the video for Nauzyciel's production of Jean Genet's Les Paravents (2023–2024), presented at the Odéon-Théâtre de l'Europe, and the stage films for his production of Ingmar Bergman's Scenes from a Marriage (2026).

In February 2018 he directed Öræfi, a video installation with music by Sigur Rós, created with the choreographer Erna Ómarsdóttir and Valdimar Jóhannsson for the Iceland Dance Company and shown on two oil tanks during the Reykjavík Winter Lights Festival. With Jóhannsson he also created the video projections for Aiōn (2019), an orchestral work by Anna Thorvaldsdottir choreographed by Ómarsdóttir and premiered by the Gothenburg Symphony Orchestra. In 2019 he directed the videos for Stéphane Foenkinos's stage adaptation of Tania de Montaigne's Noire at the Théâtre du Rond-Point.

=== Immersive works ===
With Antoine Viviani, Giraud created Solastalgia (2019), a mixed-reality installation first shown at Les Champs Libres in Rennes and selected in the New Frontier section of the 2020 Sundance Film Festival.

Colored (Noire), co-directed with Foenkinos, adapts de Montaigne's essay Noire: La Vie méconnue de Claudette Colvin. In this location-based augmented-reality installation, visitors wearing HoloLens 2 headsets follow the story of the fifteen-year-old Claudette Colvin, who refused to give up her seat to a white passenger on a bus in Montgomery, Alabama, in March 1955. The work premiered at the Centre Pompidou in Paris in April 2023, and was then selected in the New Voices competition of Tribeca Immersive at the 2023 Tribeca Festival and in the LFF Expanded programme of the 2023 BFI London Film Festival. In May 2024 it received the Award for Best Immersive Work at the 77th Cannes Film Festival, the first edition of the festival's Immersive Competition, from a jury chaired by Marie Amachoukeli. The work also received a Thea Award for Outstanding Achievement in the Extended Reality Exhibit category from the Themed Entertainment Association, the immersive experience award at the 2024 Luxembourg City Film Festival, and, in June 2026, the inaugural Annwn Prize for immersive storytelling, awarded by the Wales Millennium Centre in Cardiff with a jury chaired by Peter Swinburn.

Playing with Fire: An Immersive Odyssey with Yuja Wang, written and directed by Giraud with original artwork by Gabríela Friðriksdóttir and produced by VIVE Arts and Atlas V, is a mixed-reality experience in which the pianist Yuja Wang performs works by Bach, Debussy, Chopin, Stravinsky and Prokofiev. It opened at the Musée de la musique – Philharmonie de Paris on 14 November 2025 for a run through May 2026, received a 2026 Innovation Award from Classical:NEXT, and was selected for the Immersive Competition of the 79th Cannes Film Festival in May 2026. The installation also has an olfactory component: the perfumer Francis Kurkdjian composed scents matched to the programme, including a vanilla-based accord for Debussy's Clair de lune and an oud and saffron accord for Stravinsky's The Firebird. After Paris the work was presented in Shanghai; its UK premiere at the Southbank Centre's Royal Festival Hall is scheduled to run from 9 September 2026 to 3 January 2027.

=== Music video and documentary ===
In 2023 Giraud co-directed with Gabríela Friðriksdóttir, and animated, the video for Björk's "Victimhood", from the album Fossora, built from Friðriksdóttir's oil paintings.

With Anne Brochet he co-directed two documentary features presented in the Nouveaux Regards section of the Festival du film francophone d'Angoulême: Rêve de mouette (2022), shot in Los Angeles, and Une cabine à soi (2025), filmed among the beach huts of Cayeux-sur-Mer.

=== Novaya ===
Giraud is a co-founder of Novaya, a Paris-based company that develops immersive narrative works and the technologies used to produce them; it produced Colored with Flash Forward Entertainment and the Centre Pompidou. In 2026 its hybrid production studio project FABRIC was among the twenty projects selected in the second wave of the French government's France 2030 programme "Culture immersive et métavers", and the immersive project Montmartre, la nuit, by Giraud and Foenkinos, was selected for the Venice Gap-Financing Market of the 83rd Venice International Film Festival.

== Selected works ==
=== Immersive works ===
Year	Title	Notes
2019	Solastalgia	Mixed-reality installation, with Antoine Viviani; Les Champs Libres, Rennes; Sundance Film Festival 2020 (New Frontier)
2023	Colored (Noire)	Augmented-reality installation, with Stéphane Foenkinos, after Tania de Montaigne; Centre Pompidou; Tribeca Festival 2023; BFI London Film Festival 2023; Cannes Film Festival 2024
2025	Playing with Fire: An Immersive Odyssey with Yuja Wang	Mixed-reality experience; Philharmonie de Paris; Cannes Film Festival 2026 (Immersive Competition); Shanghai; Southbank Centre 2026–27

=== Films ===
Year	Title	Role	Notes
2009	A Portrait of You	Director	Short film, London Film School
2009	"Winter Sleep"	Director	Music video, Valgeir Sigurðsson and Dawn McCarthy
2010	La Reine s'évade	Editor	Documentary by Anne Brochet
2011	Everything, Everywhere, All the Time	Director	Documentary feature on Bedroom Community
2013	Brochet comme le poisson	Editor	Documentary by Anne Brochet
2013	Les Enfants des mille jours	Editor	Documentary by Jaco Bidermann and Claudia Soto Mansilla
2015	In Limbo	Editor	Interactive documentary by Antoine Viviani
2018	Öræfi	Director	Video installation with Sigur Rós and the Iceland Dance Company
2019	L'Empire des lumières	Director	Short film; Cairo International Film Festival
2022	Rêve de mouette	Co-director	Documentary feature, with Anne Brochet
2023	"Victimhood"	Co-director, animation	Music video for Björk, with Gabríela Friðriksdóttir
2025	Une cabine à soi	Co-director	Documentary feature, with Anne Brochet; France 3

=== Stage ===
Year	Production	Role	Notes
2014	Wide Slumber for Lepidopterists	Visuals	Chamber opera by Valgeir Sigurðsson
2016	L'Empire des lumières	Films	Directed by Arthur Nauzyciel; National Theater of Korea, MC93
2018	La Dame aux camélias	Co-adaptation (with Valérie Mréjen), films	Directed by Arthur Nauzyciel; Théâtre National de Bretagne
2019	Aiōn	Video (with Valdimar Jóhannsson)	Anna Thorvaldsdottir / Erna Ómarsdóttir; Gothenburg Symphony Orchestra
2019	Noire	Videos	Directed by Stéphane Foenkinos; Théâtre du Rond-Point
2023	Les Paravents	Video	Directed by Arthur Nauzyciel; Théâtre National de Bretagne, Odéon-Théâtre de l'Europe
2026	Scènes de la vie conjugale	Films	Directed by Arthur Nauzyciel; Théâtre National de Bretagne

== Awards ==
- 2024: Award for Best Immersive Work, 77th Cannes Film Festival, for Colored (Noire)
- 2024: Thea Award for Outstanding Achievement – Extended Reality Exhibit, Themed Entertainment Association, for Noire
- 2024: Best immersive experience, Luxembourg City Film Festival, for Noire
- 2026: Annwn Prize, Wales Millennium Centre, for Colored (Noire)
- 2026: Innovation Award, Classical:NEXT, for Playing with Fire
