= Healing Camp, Aren't You Happy =

South Korean talk show

- Genre: Talk show
- Starring: Kim Je-dong; Seo Jang-hoon; Hwang Kwang-hee
- Country of origin: South Korea
- Original language: Korean
- No. of episodes: 219

Production
- Producer: Jo Mun-joo

Original release
- Network: SBS
- Release: July 18, 2011 – February 1, 2016

Healing Camp, Aren't You Happy (Korean: 힐링캠프, 기쁘지 아니한가), or simply known as Healing Camp, is a South Korean talk show which began airing on July 18, 2011, on SBS. It is hosted by comedian Lee Kyung-kyu, broadcaster Kim Je-dong, and actress Sung Yu-ri. The program is known to have created a new genre of talk shows focused on "healing", which have become the trend of talk shows in 2012 and 2013.

Healing Camp is also known for its superior casting capabilities, inviting top actors and actresses, as well as politicians, athletes, and other influential people who are not easily seen on entertainment programs.

In June 2013, it was announced that Han Hye-jin would leave the program following her marriage to footballer Ki Sung-yueng in July and would move to London with him.

== Hosts ==
- Kim Je-dong (July 18, 2011 – February 1, 2016)
- Han Hye-jin (July 18, 2011 – August 12, 2013)
- Lee Kyung-kyu (July 18, 2011 –July 20, 2015)
- Sung Yu-ri (August 19, 2013 – July 20, 2015)
- Seo Jang-hoon (October 12, 2015 – February 1, 2016)
- Hwang Kwang-hee (October 12, 2015 – February 1, 2016)

== List of episodes ==
=== 2011 ===
List of episodes in 2011 (episode 1-23)

Episode #	Original airdate	Guest(s)
1	July 18, 2011	Kim Yeong-cheol
2	July 25, 2011	Kim Tae-won
3	August 1, 2011	Ji Sung
4	August 8, 2011	Uhm Ji-won
5	August 15, 2011	YB
6	August 22, 2011	Cha Tae-hyun
7	August 29, 2011	Ko Chang-seok
8	September 5, 2011	Ock Joo-hyun
9	September 12, 2011	Boom, Lee Yoon-seok, Yoon Hyung-bin, Kim Bum-soo, Kim Tae-woo, Park Ji-yoon, Park Tam-hee, Kang Full
10	September 19, 2011	Yoo Jun-sang
11	September 26, 2011	Lee Dong-wook
12	October 3, 2011	Choo Sung-hoon
13	October 10, 2011	Jang Hyuk
14	October 17, 2011	Choi Kyung-ju
15	October 24, 2011	Choi Kyung-ju
16	October 31, 2011	Kim Suk-hoon
17	November 7, 2011	Kolleen Park
18	November 14, 2011	Lee Seung-hwan
19	November 21, 2011	Choo Shin-soo
20	November 28, 2011	Oh Yeon-soo
21	December 5, 2011	Lee Mi-sook
22	December 12, 2011	Kim Yeon-woo
23	December 26, 2011	Choi Ji-woo

=== 2012 ===
List of episodes in 2012 (episode 24-75)

Episode #	Original airdate	Guest(s)
24	January 2, 2012	Park Geun-hye
25	January 9, 2012	Moon Jae-in
26	January 16, 2012	Lee Min-jung
27	January 23, 2012	Lee Dong-gook
28	January 30, 2012	Choi Min-sik
29	February 6, 2012	Choi Min-sik
30	February 13, 2012	Yoon Jong-shin
31	February 20, 2012	BIGBANG
32	February 27, 2012	Yoon Je-moon
33	March 5, 2012	Chae Shi-ra
34	March 12, 2012	Cha In-pyo
35	March 19, 2012	Cha In-pyo
36	March 26, 2012	Kim Jeong-woon
37	April 2, 2012	Kim Jeong-woon
38	April 9, 2012	Shin Eun-kyung
39	April 16, 2012	Lee Hyori
40	April 23, 2012	Lee Hyori
41	April 30, 2012	Park Jin-young
42	May 7, 2012	Patti Kim
43	May 14, 2012	Yang Hyun-suk
44	May 21, 2012	Yang Hyun-suk
45	May 28, 2012	Pomnyun
46	June 4, 2012	Pomnyun
47	June 11, 2012	Jong Tae-se
48	June 18, 2012	Park Bum-shin
49	June 25, 2012	Go Doo-shim
50	July 2, 2012	Go Doo-shim
51	July 9, 2012	Ko So-young
52	July 16, 2012	Ko So-young
53	July 23, 2012	Ahn Cheol-soo
54	August 4, 2012	Jin Jong-oh, Han Soon-chul, Song Dae-nam, Kim Jae-bum, Cho Jun-ho
55	August 11, 2012	London Camp
56	August 12, 2012	Ki Bo-bae, Oh Jin-hyek, Jin Jong-oh, Jang Mi-ran
57	August 13, 2012	Psy
58	August 20, 2012	Ki Sung-yueng
59	August 27, 2012	Ki Sung-yueng
59	August 27, 2012	Ha Jung-woo
60	September 3, 2012	Ha Jung-woo
61	September 10, 2012	Kim Ha-neul
62	September 17, 2012	Kim Ha-neul
63	September 24, 2012	Jeong Hyeong-don
64	October 1, 2012	Lee Yong-dae, Jung Jae-sung
65	October 8, 2012	Lee Sung-min
66	October 15, 2012	Ahn Jae-wook
67	October 22, 2012	Chang Kiha
68	October 29, 2012	Kim Yong-man
69	November 5, 2012	Tablo, Kang Hye-jung
70	November 12, 2012	Jo Hye-ryun
71	November 19, 2012	Lee Seung-yeop, Lee Song-jeong (Note: Lee Song-jeong only appeared on episode 72.)
72	December 3, 2012	Lee Seung-yeop, Lee Song-jeong
73	December 10, 2012	Park Si-hoo
74	December 17, 2012	Kim Hee-sun
75	December 24, 2012	Kim Hee-sun

=== 2013 ===
List of episodes in 2013 (episode 76-122)

Episode #	Original airdate	Guest(s)
76	January 7, 2013	Pak Se-ri
77	January 14, 2013	Kim Rae-won
78	January 21, 2013	Baek Jong-won, So Yoo-jin
79	January 28, 2013	Lee Joon-gi
80	February 4, 2013	Hong Seok-cheon
81	February 11, 2013	Choi Min-soo
82	February 18, 2013	Kim Kang-woo
83	February 25, 2013	Kim Sung-ryung
84	March 4, 2013	Han Suk-kyu
85	March 11, 2013	Lee Byung-hun
85	March 18, 2013	Lee Byung-hun
86	March 25, 2013	Sul Kyung-gu
86	April 1, 2013	Sul Kyung-gu
87	April 8, 2013	Kang Woo-suk
88	April 15, 2013	Lee Jung-jae
89	April 22, 2013	Kim In-kwon
90	April 29, 2013	Kim Hae-sook
91	May 6, 2013	Youn Yuh-jung
92	May 13, 2013	Venerable Jung-mok
93	May 20, 2013	Jang Yun-jeong
94	May 27, 2013	Lee So-ra
95	June 3, 2013	Park Tae-hwan
96	June 10, 2013	Lee Seung-chul
97	June 17, 2013	Nick Vujicic
98	June 24, 2013	Han Hye-jin, Ki Sung-yueng (Note: Ki Sung-yueng only appeared on the second half (on July 1).)
98	July 1, 2013	Han Hye-jin, Ki Sung-yueng
99	July 8, 2013	Im Ji-ho
100	July 15, 2013	Yoon Do-hyun, Kim Sung-ryung, Yoo Jun-sang, Ko Chang-seok, Baek Jong-won, Pomnyun, Hong Seok-cheon (Note: Yoo Jun-sang only appeared on the first half (on July 15).)
100	July 22, 2013	Yoon Do-hyun, Kim Sung-ryung, Yoo Jun-sang, Ko Chang-seok, Baek Jong-won, Pomnyun, Hong Seok-cheon
101	July 29, 2013	Suzy (Miss A)
102	August 5, 2013	Lee Juck
103	August 12, 2013	Kim Kwang-kyu
104	August 19, 2013	Ham Ik-byeong
105	August 26, 2013	Seo Kyung-seok
106	September 2, 2013	Park In-bee
107	September 9, 2013	Lee Ji-seon
108	September 16, 2013	Kim Mi-sook
109	September 23, 2013	Moon So-ri
110	September 30, 2013	Han Ji-hye
111	October 7, 2013	Baek Ji-young
112	October 14, 2013	Joo Sang-wook
113	October 21, 2013	Shin Seung-hun
114	October 28, 2013	Kim Min-jong
115	November 4, 2013	Kim Min-jong
116	November 11, 2013	Shin Kyung-sook
117	November 18, 2013	Kim Sung-joo
118	November 25, 2013	Kim Sung-joo
119	December 2, 2013	Kim Soo-ro
120	December 9, 2013	Kim Gura
121	December 16, 2013	Kim Gura
121	December 16, 2013	Lee Sung-jae
122	December 23, 2013	Lee Sung-jae

=== 2014 ===
List of episodes in 2014 (episode 123-164)

Episode #	Original airdate	Guest(s)
123	January 6, 2014	Lee Hwi-jae
124	January 13, 2014	Lee Hwi-jae
125	January 20, 2014	Hwang Jung-min
126	January 27, 2014	Kim Byung-man
127	February 3, 2014	Kang Shin-joo
128	February 17, 2014	Lee Sang-hwa
128	February 19, 2014	Lee Kyou-hyuk
129	February 24, 2014	Kim Hee-ae
130	March 3, 2014	Kim Hee-ae
130	March 3, 2014	Lee Bo-young
131	March 10, 2014	Lee Bo-young
132	March 17, 2014	Girls' Generation
133	March 31, 2014	Oh Hyun-kyung
134	April 7, 2014	Lee Sun-hee, Baek Ji-young, Lee Seung-gi
135	April 14, 2014	Lee Sun-hee, Baek Ji-young, Lee Seung-gi
136	May 5, 2014	Lee Dong-woo
137	May 12, 2014	Jang Hyun-sung
138	May 19, 2014	Lee Sun-kyun
139	June 2, 2014	Lee Sun-kyun, Lee Woon-jae
139	June 9, 2014	Ahn Jae-wook, Kim Min-jong, Kim Bo-sung, Sumi Jo
139	June 16, 2014	Kang Boo-ja, Lee Dong-gook, Kim Min-jong, Kim Soo-ro, Lee Woon-jae
139	June 23, 2014	Kang Boo-ja, Lee Dong-gook, Kim Min-jong, Kim Soo-ro, Lee Woon-jae
139	June 30, 2014	Kang Boo-ja, Kim Min-jong, Kim Soo-ro, Lee Woon-jae, Cha Bum-kun, Bae Seong-jae
140	July 7, 2014	IU, Kim Chang-wan, Akdong Musician
141	July 14, 2014	IU, Kim Chang-wan, Akdong Musician
142	July 21, 2014	Shin Ae-ra
143	July 28, 2014	Shin Ae-ra
144	August 4, 2014	Jung Woong-in
145	August 11, 2014	Lee Ji-ah
146	August 18, 2014	Ryu Seung-soo
147	August 25, 2014	Hong Jin-kyung
148	September 1, 2014	Hong Jin-kyung
149	September 8, 2014	Lee Mi-ja
150	September 15, 2014	Song Hae
151	September 22, 2014	Song Hae
152	September 29, 2014	Yoo Yeon-seok
153	October 6, 2014	Kim Joon-ho
154	October 13, 2014	Jang Na-ra
155	October 20, 2014	Lee Yoo-ri
156	November 3, 2014	Son Yeon-jae
157	November 10, 2014	Yoon Sang
158	November 17, 2014	Hong Eun-hee
159	November 24, 2014	Yoon Sang-hyun, Joo Sang-wook, Kim Kwang-kyu, Baek Jong-won
160	December 1, 2014	Yang Hyun-suk, You Hee-yeol
161	December 8, 2014	Kim Bong-jin, Kim Young-ha
162	December 15, 2014	Sean, Jung Hye-young
163	December 22, 2014	Sean, Jung Hye-young
164	December 29, 2014	Park Ji-min, Lee Hi, Baek A-yeon (K-pop Star season 1's Top 3); Akdong Musician (K-pop Star 2's winner); Bernard Park, Sam Kim, Kwon Jin-ah (K-pop Star 3's Top 3)

=== 2015 ===
List of episodes in 2015 (episode 165-215)

Episode #	Original airdate	Guest(s)	Note(s)
165	January 5, 2015	Ha Jung-woo	
166	January 12, 2015	Ha Jung-woo	
166	January 12, 2015	Baek Jong-won, Yoo Jun-sang, Lee Seung-yuop, Kim In-kwon, Ock Joo-hyun, Yoon Do-hyun, Lee Yoon-seok	New Year Special.
167	January 19, 2015	Baek Jong-won, Yoo Jun-sang, Lee Seung-yuop, Kim In-kwon, Ock Joo-hyun, Yoon Do-hyun, Lee Yoon-seok	New Year Special.
168	January 26, 2015	Kim Jong-kook	Special appearance by Kim Jung-nam
169	February 2, 2015	Kim Jong-kook	Special appearance by Lee Kwang-soo and Gary (via video)
170	February 9, 2015	Shoo, Park Eun-kyung, Choi Jung-yoon	
171	February 16, 2015	Lee Man-ki, Nam Jae-hyeon, Kim Il-joong	
172	February 23, 2015	Shinhwa	
173	March 2, 2015	Kim Gun-mo	
174	March 9, 2015	Kim Sang-kyung	
175	March 16, 2015	Haha	Special appearance by Byul
176	March 23, 2015		
177	March 30, 2015	Lee Moon-se	
178	April 6, 2015	Lee Moon-se	Lee Moon-se's Healing Concert with Friends
179	April 13, 2015	Kim Gu-ra, Kim Tae-won, Kim Sung-joo, Jung Ryeo-won	
180	April 20, 2015	Kim Gu-ra, Kim Tae-won, Kim Sung-joo, Jung Ryeo-won	
181	April 27, 2015	Son Hyun-joo, Kim Ah-joong, Jung Ryeo-won	
182	May 4, 2015	Yoo Ho-jeong	
183	May 11, 2015	Yoo Ho-jeong	
184	May 18, 2015	Huh Young-man, Yoon Tae-ho	
185	May 25, 2015	Jeon In-hwa, Lee Yoon-seok, Pomnyun	
186	June 1, 2015	Lee Soo-hyuk, Kim Young-kwang, Seo Jang-hoon, Don Spike, Park Soo-hong, Kim Jun-hyun	Gourmet Camp part 1
187	June 8, 2015	Lee Soo-hyuk, Kim Young-kwang, Seo Jang-hoon, Don Spike, Park Soo-hong, Kim Jun-hyun	Gourmet Camp part 2; Special appearance by Jang Ye-won
188	June 15, 2015	Lee Yeon-bok, Choi Hyun-seok	
189	June 22, 2015	Lee Deok-hwa, Choi Soo-jong, Lee Ji-hyun	
190	June 29, 2015	Hwang Seok-jeong, Gil Hae-yeon	
191	July 6, 2015		4 Year Anniversary
192	July 13, 2015	Lee Kyung-kyu, Sung Yu-ri, Lee Hwi-jae	Best of Healing Camp; Last episode of Lee Kyung-kyu and Sung Yu-ri
193	July 20, 2015	Lee Kyung-kyu, Sung Yu-ri, Lee Hwi-jae	Best of Healing Camp; Last episode of Lee Kyung-kyu and Sung Yu-ri
194	July 27, 2015	Hwang Jung-min	Debut of the new format 500 vs 1
195	August 3, 2015	Gary	Special appearance by Lee Kwang-soo and Jung-in at place, Song Ji-hyo (via telephone)
196	August 10, 2015	Park Hyung-sik	Special appearance by Hwang Kwang-hee and Yim Si-wan
197	August 17, 2015	Hong Seok-cheon	
198	August 24, 2015	Jeong Hyeong-don	
199	August 31, 2015	Kim Sang-joong	Special appearance by EXID's Hani
200	September 7, 2015	Jang Yun-jeong	
201	September 14, 2015	Lee Man-ki	Special appearance by Lee Man-ki's mother-in-law
202	September 21, 2015	Seo Jang-hoon	Special appearance by Sistar's Soyou
203	September 28, 2015	Yoon Do-hyun & YB	Special appearance by SNSD's Sooyoung
204	October 5, 2015	Lee Seung-hwan	Special appearance by Ryoo Seung-wan, Joo Jin-woo, Kang Full
205	October 12, 2015	Joo Won	Special appearance by Kim Tae-hee, Yoo Hae-jin and Jung Woong-in (via video); First episode as MCs of Seo Jang-hoon and Hwang Kwanghee
206	October 19, 2015	Jang Yoon-ju	Special appearance by Hwang Jung-min, Yoon-ju's husband Jung Seung-min (via video)
207	November 2, 2015	Ahn Jae-wook	Special appearance by Cha Tae-hyun (via video), musical actress & Ahn Jae-wook's wife Choi Hyun-joo (via telephone)
208	November 9, 2015	Shin Seung-hun	Special appearance by Kangta (via video)
209	November 16, 2015	Shin Seung-hun	Special appearance by Hwang Chi-yeul
210	November 23, 2015	Park Jin-young	Special appearance by Yang Hyun-suk and Yoo Hee-yeol (via video)
211	November 30, 2015	Kim Kwang-kyu	Special appearance by Lee Seo-jin and Hong Jin-young (via video), Jeong Eun (at place)
212	December 7, 2015	g.o.d	Special appearance by AOA's Seolhyun (via telephone) and Han Ye-ri (at place)
213	December 14, 2015	Lee Guk-joo, Park Na-rae	Special appearance by Na-rae's mother Go Myeong-suk at the end
214	December 21, 2015	Yoo Jun-sang	Special appearance by Hong Eun-hee, Yang Hyun-suk and Yoo Hee-yeol (via video), Kim Jong-jin (at place)
215	December 28, 2015	Kyuhyun (Super Junior), Kim Gun-mo, Ailee, Jessi, Dynamic Duo	Year-end Special; Soundtrack of My Life Part 1

=== 2016 ===
List of episodes in 2016 (episode 216-219)

Episode #	Original airdate	Guest(s)	Note(s)
216	January 11, 2016	Jung Eun-ji (Apink), Hong Ji-min, Hong Jin-young, Eric Nam, Byun Jin-sub, Rose Motel	Soundtrack of My Life Part 2; Title song : Shooting Myself - Jung Eun-ji (Original : Maya) (Note: The title song of each day was chosen by 500 audiences after all guest's performances.)
217	January 18, 2016	Yoon Min-soo, K.Will, Wheesung, Choi Hyun-seok, Noh Sa-yeon, Jung-in, Solji (EXID)	Soundtrack of My Life Part 3; Title song : I'll Be With You - K.Will
218	January 25, 2016	Jang Yun-jeong, Sojin (Girl's Day), Byul, Jessi, Jo Kwon (2AM), Hyun Jin-young, Lee Hyun-woo	Soundtrack of My Life Part 4; Title song : Mother - Jo Kwon (Original : Ra.D)
219	February 1, 2016	Lyn, Minah (Girl's Day), Lena Park, Navi, Noel (Kang Kyun-sung, Jeon Woo-sung), Norazo	Last episode of Healing Camp; Special appearance by Lee Ae-ran; Soundtrack of My Life Part 5; Title song : Together - Kang Kyun-sung ft. Jeon Woo-sung (Original : Kim Gun-mo ft. Park Kwang-hyun)

== Ratings ==
In the ratings below, the highest rating for the show will in be red, and the lowest rating for the show will be in blue each year.

=== 2011 ===
List of ratings

Episode #	Original Airdate	TNmS Ratings Nationwide	AGB Ratings Nationwide
1	July 25, 2011	4.8%	5.4%
2	July 25, 2011	5.4%	6.2%
3	August 1, 2011	4.8%	6.0%
4	August 8, 2011	5.2%	5.0%
5	August 15, 2011	5.3%	6.9%
6	August 22, 2011	5.1%	6.8%
7	August 29, 2011	6.2%	6.8%
8	September 5, 2011	5.5%	6.3%
9	September 12, 2011	5.5%	6.3%
10	September 19, 2011	6.4%	5.9%
11	September 26, 2011	4.8%	6.4%
12	October 3, 2011	4.2%	5.5%
13	October 10, 2011	5.5%	6.8%
14	October 17, 2011	5.5%	7.2%
15	October 24, 2011	5.7%	7.0%
16	October 31, 2011	5.0%	5.8%
17	November 7, 2011	6.9%	7.8%
18	November 14, 2011	7.1%	7.2%
19	November 21, 2011	5.3%	5.2%
20	November 28, 2011	6.6%	7.5%
21	December 5, 2011	6.5%	8.0%
22	December 12, 2011	5.3%	5.9%
23	December 26, 2011	4.3%	5.9%

=== 2012 ===
List of ratings

Episode #	Original Airdate	TNmS Ratings Nationwide	AGB Ratings Nationwide
24	January 2, 2012	8.5%	12.2%
25	January 9, 2012	8.7%	10.5%
26	January 16, 2012	7.7%	7.9%
27	January 23, 2012	6.1%	6.0%
28	January 30, 2012	5.8%	7.1%
29	February 6, 2012	7.9%	7.3%
30	February 13, 2012	7.6%	6.4%
31	February 20, 2012	8.9%	7.2%
32	February 27, 2012	6.7%	6.4%
33	March 5, 2012	5.3%	6.8%
34	March 12, 2012	7.5%	9.8%
35	March 19, 2012	8.0%	10.4%
36	March 26, 2012	6.6%	6.9%
37	April 2, 2012	6.5%	7.2%
38	April 9, 2012	7.8%	9.1%
39	April 16, 2012	8.9%	10.2%
40	April 23, 2012	8.4%	10.5%
41	April 30, 2012	8.5%	10.4%
42	May 7, 2012	6.1%	7.4%
43	May 14, 2012	8.9%	9.1%
44	May 21, 2012	9.6%	10.8%
45	May 28, 2012	6.6%	9.5%
46	June 4, 2012	7.4%	9.5%
47	June 11, 2012	6.5%	8.3%
48	June 18, 2012	4.9%	5.8%
49	June 25, 2012	7.8%	9.0%
50	July 2, 2012	6.6%	7.5%
51	July 9, 2012	11.4%	13.2%
52	July 16, 2012	10.5%	11.9%
53	July 23, 2012	15.7%	18.7%
54	August 4, 2012	9.7%	10.7%
54	August 4, 2012	10.3%	13.1%
55	August 11, 2012	3.2%	3.7%
56	August 12, 2012	10.8%	10.1%
57	August 13, 2012	11.9%	11.9%
58	August 20, 2012	14.2%	12.5%
59	August 27, 2012	9.3%	8.9%
60	September 3, 2012	8.4%	6.9%
61	September 10, 2012	7.4%	8.5%
62	September 17, 2012	7.3%	6.9%
63	September 24, 2012	9.8%	10.3%
64	October 1, 2012	5.7%	4.9%
65	October 8, 2012	6.1%	6.4%
66	October 15, 2012	7.2%	10.1%
67	October 22, 2012	6.3%	6.1%
68	October 29, 2012	6.7%	7.4%
69	November 5, 2012	7.4%	7.1%
70	November 12, 2012	6.4%	8.3%
71	November 19, 2012	6.6%	7.5%
72	December 3, 2012	5.6%	7.2%
73	December 10, 2012	6.3%	5.8%
74	December 17, 2012	7.2%	7.5%
75	December 24, 2012	7.5%	8.4%

=== 2013 ===
List of ratings

Episode #	Original Airdate	TNmS Ratings Nationwide	AGB Ratings Nationwide
76	January 7, 2013	6.4%	8.3%
77	January 14, 2013	6.5%	7.3%
78	January 21, 2013	8.0%	9.3%
79	January 28, 2013	5.2%	5.8%
80	February 4, 2013	7.1%	8.4%
81	February 11, 2013	6.0%	5.9%
82	February 18, 2013	9.5%	10.7%
83	February 25, 2013	8.4%	10.4%
84	March 4, 2013	6.9%	8.8%
85	March 11, 2013	8.7%	9.5%
85	March 18, 2013	7.4%	9.5%
86	March 25, 2013	7.0%	8.0%
86	April 1, 2013	6.5%	7.3%
87	April 8, 2013	5.2%	5.5%
88	April 15, 2013	5.8%	7.0%
89	April 22, 2013	4.3%	5.3%
90	April 29, 2013	5.7%	6.7%
91	May 6, 2013	6.1%	7.6%
92	May 13, 2013	5.1%	5.9%
93	May 20, 2013	9.1%	12.1%
94	May 27, 2013	5.9%	7.1%
95	June 3, 2013	5.5%	7.1%
96	June 10, 2013	6.5%	7.0%
97	June 17, 2013	6.3%	6.8%
98	June 24, 2013	8.3%	10.0%
98	July 1, 2013	8.5%	9.7%
99	July 8, 2013	6.1%	7.1%
100	July 15, 2013	7.0%	8.7%
100	July 22, 2013	5.5%	6.7%
101	July 29, 2013	6.8%	7.6%
102	August 5, 2013	5.9%	5.5%
103	August 12, 2013	6.8%	7.4%
104	August 19, 2013	6.5%	8.8%
105	August 26, 2013	7.0%	9.0%
106	September 2, 2013	3.3%	5.2%
107	September 9, 2013	5.1%	6.8%
108	September 16, 2013	6.2%	7.1%
109	September 23, 2013	5.0%	5.5%
110	September 30, 2013	5.2%	6.3%
111	October 7, 2013	5.4%	6.0%
112	October 14, 2013	5.7%	6.2%
113	October 21, 2013	5.4%	6.4%
114	October 28, 2013	5.8%	7.0%
115	November 4, 2013	4.7%	6.3%
116	November 11, 2013	3.5%	4.9%
117	November 18, 2013	5.6%	7.4%
118	November 25, 2013	6.1%	7.1%
119	December 2, 2013	5.3%	6.1%
120	December 9, 2013	4.9%	6.0%
121	December 16, 2013	3.9%	5.9%
122	December 23, 2013	5.2%	6.9%

=== 2014 ===
List of ratings

Episode #	Original Airdate	TNmS Ratings Nationwide	AGB Ratings Nationwide
123	January 6, 2014	8.5%	9.0%
124	January 13, 2014	8.7%	9.1%
125	January 20, 2014	5.4%	7.2%
126	January 27, 2014	7.8%	7.9%
127	February 3, 2014	5.2%	6.2%
128	February 17, 2014	8.4%	8.9%
129	February 24, 2014	8.1%	8.8%
130	March 3, 2014	6.5%	7.5%
131	March 10, 2014	6.2%	7.4%
132	March 17, 2014	6.8%	7.5%
133	March 31, 2014	4.9%	5.8%
134	April 7, 2014	7.1%	7.6%
135	April 14, 2014	6.9%	7.8%
136	May 5, 2014	5.4%	5.3%
137	May 12, 2014	4.3%	5.8%
138	May 19, 2014	5.7%	6.0%
139	June 2, 2014	4.4%	4.7%
140	June 9, 2014	4.2%	5.2%
141	June 16, 2014	5.4%	6.1%
142	June 22, 2014	6.6%	7.4%
143	June 30, 2014	3.5%	3.7%
144	July 7, 2014	5.7%	6.0%
145	July 14, 2014	4.7%	4.8%
146	July 21, 2014	6.0%	6.4%
147	July 28, 2014	6.7%	6.9%
148	August 4, 2014	6.8%	6.9%
149	August 11, 2014	7.6%	7.9%
146	August 18, 2014	5.0%	5.9%
147	August 25, 2014	6.0%	6.1%
148	September 1, 2014	6.9%	7.0%
149	September 9, 2014	4.6%	5.0%
150	September 15, 2014	3.6%	4.6%
151	September 22, 2014	3.9%	4.1%
152	September 29, 2014	4.2%	4.6%
153	October 6, 2014	4.4%	5.4%
154	October 13, 2014	3.6%	3.7%
155	October 20, 2014	5.4%	4.7%
156	November 3, 2014	4.5%	4.6%
157	November 10, 2014	3.3%	4.2%
158	November 17, 2014	4.3%	4.6%
159	November 24, 2014	5.0%	6.1%
160	December 1, 2014	5.2%	5.7%
161	December 8, 2014	2.8%	3.8%
162	December 15, 2014	5.0%	5.3%
163	December 22, 2014	5.6%	5.9%
164	December 29, 2014	3.9%	4.4%

=== 2015 ===
List of ratings

Episode #	Original Airdate	TNmS Ratings Nationwide	AGB Ratings Nationwide
165	January 5, 2015	4.4%	5.0%
166	January 12, 2015	6.6%	7.4%
167	January 19, 2015	6.1%	7.2%
168	January 26, 2015	5.5%	5.9%
169	February 2, 2015	5.4%	5.5%
170	February 9, 2015	5.1%	6.1%
171	February 16, 2015	5.2%	7.2%
172	February 23, 2015	3.8%	3.9%
173	March 2, 2015	5.3%	5.2%
174	March 9, 2015	4.8%	5.3%
175	March 16, 2015	4.9%	3.9%
176	March 23, 2015	5.4%	5.4%
177	March 30, 2015	5.1%	4.8%
178	April 6, 2015	5.2%	5.0%
179	April 13, 2015	5.5%	6.3%
180	April 20, 2015	5.0%	5.4%
181	April 27, 2015	4.2%	4.4%
182	May 4, 2015	5.8%	6.0%
183	May 11, 2015	4.5%	5.0%
184	May 18, 2015	3.5%	3.9%
185	May 25, 2015	3.7%	4.5%
186	June 1, 2015	3.5%	3.4%
187	June 8, 2015	3.7%	3.7%
188	June 15, 2015	4.7%	5.8%
189	June 22, 2015	4.4%	4.2%
190	June 29, 2015	4.1%	4.2%
191	July 6, 2015	3.1%	4.1%
192	July 13, 2015	3.5%	3.4%
193	July 20, 2015	4.1%	4.3%
194	July 27, 2015	3.9%	4.3%
195	August 3, 2015	3.4%	3.7%
196	August 10, 2015	3.8%	3.8%
197	August 17, 2015	3.6%	3.5%
198	August 24, 2015	2.8%	3.7%
199	August 31, 2015		
200	September 7, 2015		
201	September 14, 2015		
202	September 21, 2015		
203	September 28, 2015		
204	October 5, 2015		
205	October 12, 2015		
206	October 19, 2015		
207	November 2, 2015		
208	November 9, 2015		
209	November 16, 2015		
210	November 23, 2015		
211	November 30, 2015		
212	December 7, 2015		
213	December 14, 2015		
214	December 21, 2015		
215	December 28, 2015		

=== 2016 ===
List of ratings

Episode #	Original Airdate	TNmS Ratings Nationwide	AGB Ratings Nationwide
216	January 11, 2016	3.8%	3.7%
217	January 18, 2016	3.4%	4.2%
218	January 25, 2016	3.5%	4.1%
219	February 1, 2016	3.6%	3.8%

== Awards and nominations ==
Year	Award	Category	Recipient	Result
2011	SBS Entertainment Awards	PD Award (Best MC)	Lee Kyung-kyu	Won
2011	SBS Entertainment Awards	Best Newcomer	Han Hye-jin	Won
2012	SBS Entertainment Awards	Top Excellence Award	Lee Kyung-kyu	Won
2012	SBS Entertainment Awards	Excellence Program Award	Healing Camp	Won
2012	SBS Entertainment Awards	Best Writer	Kim Mi-kyung	Won
2012	SBS Entertainment Awards	Excellence Award	Han Hye-jin	Won
2012	Mnet 20's Choice Awards	20's Variety Star	Han Hye-jin	Won
2012	Korean Womenlink	Green Media Award	Han Hye-jin	Won
2013	SBS Entertainment Awards	Top Excellence Award	Lee Kyung-kyu	Won
2013	SBS Entertainment Awards	Excellence Program Award	Healing Camp	Won
2013	SBS Entertainment Awards	Excellence Award	Sung Yu-ri	Won
2014	SBS Entertainment Awards	Daesang (Grand Prize)	Lee Kyung-kyu	Won
2014	SBS Entertainment Awards	PD Award (TV)	Sung Yu-ri	Won
