= Lee Eung-jun =

South Korean writer (born 1970)

Lee Eung Jun (Hangul 이응준; born 1970) is a South Korean writer. He debuted as a poet in 1990 when the quarterly journal Literature & Criticism published his poem “Kkaedareumeun gapjagi chajaonda” (깨달음은 갑자기 찾아온다 Epiphanies Come Without Warning). In 1994 his short story “Geuneun chueogui sokdoro georeogatda” (그는 추억의 속도로 걸아갔다 He Walked at the Speed of Memory) appeared in the journal Imagination, marking the beginning of his career as a novelist. He has been noted for his portrayal of South Korean youths living through the 1990s. His characters tend to perceive pain over pleasure, sadness over joy, and solitude over companionship. Lee also writes screenplays and directs his own work. His cinematic flair is reflected in his novels.

In June 2015, Lee wrote an article entitled “Usangui eodum, munhagui tarak” (우상의 어둠, 문학의 타락 The Dark Side of an Idol and the Corruption of Literature) accusing the novelist Shin Kyung-sook of plagiarizing Yukio Mishima. The article caused an uproar in South Korean literary circles and sparked a debate on literary plagiarism.

== Life ==
Lee Eung Jun was born in Seoul, South Korea in 1970. He earned his bachelor's and master's degrees in German literature and doctoral degree in Korean literature at Hanyang University. He made his literary debut in 1990 when “Kkaedareumeun gapjagi chajaonda” (깨달음은 갑자기 찾아온다 Epiphanies Come Without Warning) and nine other poems were published in the winter issue of the journal Literature & Criticism. His first work of fiction was “Geuneun chueogui sokdoro georeogatda” (그는 추억의 속도로 걸아갔다 He Walked at the Speed of Memory), a short story published in the fall 1994 issue of the journal Imagination.

Lee, who began his literary career at the age of 25, spent most of his twenties in a hospital ward taking care of his mother who was fighting cancer. In his autobiographical short story “Ororareul bora” (오로라를 보라 Behold the Aurora), he writes that “obscene books and the smell of moldy blankets festered his heart at the age of twenty-seven” and that “the struggles of looking after a terminal cancer patient was less frustrating than having to write trapped in a ward.”

Apart from writing poetry and fiction, Lee wrote and directed Lemon Tree, a 40-minute film that screened at the New York Asian American International Film Festival and Paris International Short Film Festival. His novel Nae Yeonaeui modeun geot (내 연애의 모든 것 All About My Romance), which centers around an unlikely romance between two members of the South Korean National Assembly who belong to opposite sides of the political spectrum, has been adapted into a TV show.

== Writing ==
In the preface to his novel Sonyeoneul wuihan sarangui haeseok (소년을 위한 사랑의 해석 An Interpretation of Love for Boys), Lee writes:

“What is fiction? As literature is my religion, this question is a catechism to me. If someone asked me that same question, I’d answer: fiction is a story about people, and a story about people describes how they fall in and out of love. They love without knowing what love is and sometimes even burn life away because of it. But they grow as they embrace the chaos of love and sing. I like to think of all such people as ‘boys,’ and it is with this image of the boy in mind that I wrote the stories in this book.”

The above quote suggests why some critics have associated Lee with aestheticism. His figurative use of the word “boy” to refer to any person in love is an example of his aesthetic portrayals of youth.

== Works ==
Fiction

1. 『소년을 위한 사랑의 해석』, 문학과지성사, 2017.

An Interpretation of Love for Boys. Moonji, 2017.

2. 『영혼의 무기』, 비채, 2017년, ISBN 9788934972402

The Soul’s Weapon. Viche, 2017.

3. 『약혼』, 문학동네, 2014년, ISBN 9788954625258

Engagement. Munhakdongne, 2014.

4. 『밤의 첼로』, 민음사, 2013년, ISBN 9788937487309

Cello of the Night. Minumsa, 2013.

5. 『느릅나무 아래 숨긴 천국』, 시공사, 2013년, ISBN 9788952763952

The Heaven Hidden under the Elm Tree. Sigongsa, 2013.

6. 『내 연애의 모든 것』, 민음사, 2012년, ISBN 9788937484384

All About My Romance. Minumsa, 2012.

7. 『내 여자친구의 장례식 – 개정판』, 문학동네, 2009년, ISBN 9788954608817

My Girlfriend’s Funeral. Munhakdongne, 2009.

8. 『국가의 사생활』, 민음사, 2009년, ISBN 9788937482564

Private Life of a Nation. Minumsa, 2009.

9. 『약혼』, 문학동네, 2006년, ISBN 9788954601498

Engagement. Munhakdongne, 2006.

10. 『그는 추억의 속도로 걸어갔다』, 민음사, 2005년, ISBN 9788937420276

He Walked at the Speed of Memory. Minumsa, 2005.

11. 『전갈자리에서 생긴 일』, 작가정신, 2004년, ISBN 9788972882329

What Happened at Scorpio. Jakkajungsin, 2004.

12. 『무정한 짐승의 연애』, 문학과지성사, 2004년, ISBN 9788932014937

Romance of a Merciless Beast. Moonji, 2004.

13. 『달의 뒤편으로 가는 자전거 여행』, 문학과지성사, 2004년, ISBN 9788932014920

Cycling to the Back of the Moon. Moonji, 2004.

Poetry

1. 『애인』, 민음사, 2012년, ISBN 9788937408007

Lover. Minumsa, 2012.

2. 『나무들이 그 숲을 거부했다』, 작가정신, 2004년, ISBN 9788972882336

Trees Refused the Forest. Jakkajungsin, 2004.

3. 『낙타와의 장거리 경주』, 세계사, 2002년, ISBN 9788933811184

Long-distance Race with Camels. Segyesa, 2002.

=== Works in Translation ===
1. Asia Literary Review : Autumn 2015 (English)
2. Vita privata di una nazione (Italian)

== Awards ==
1. 2015: 16th Lee Mu-young Literature Prize
