= Hwang Seon-mi =

South Korean author and professor (born 1963)

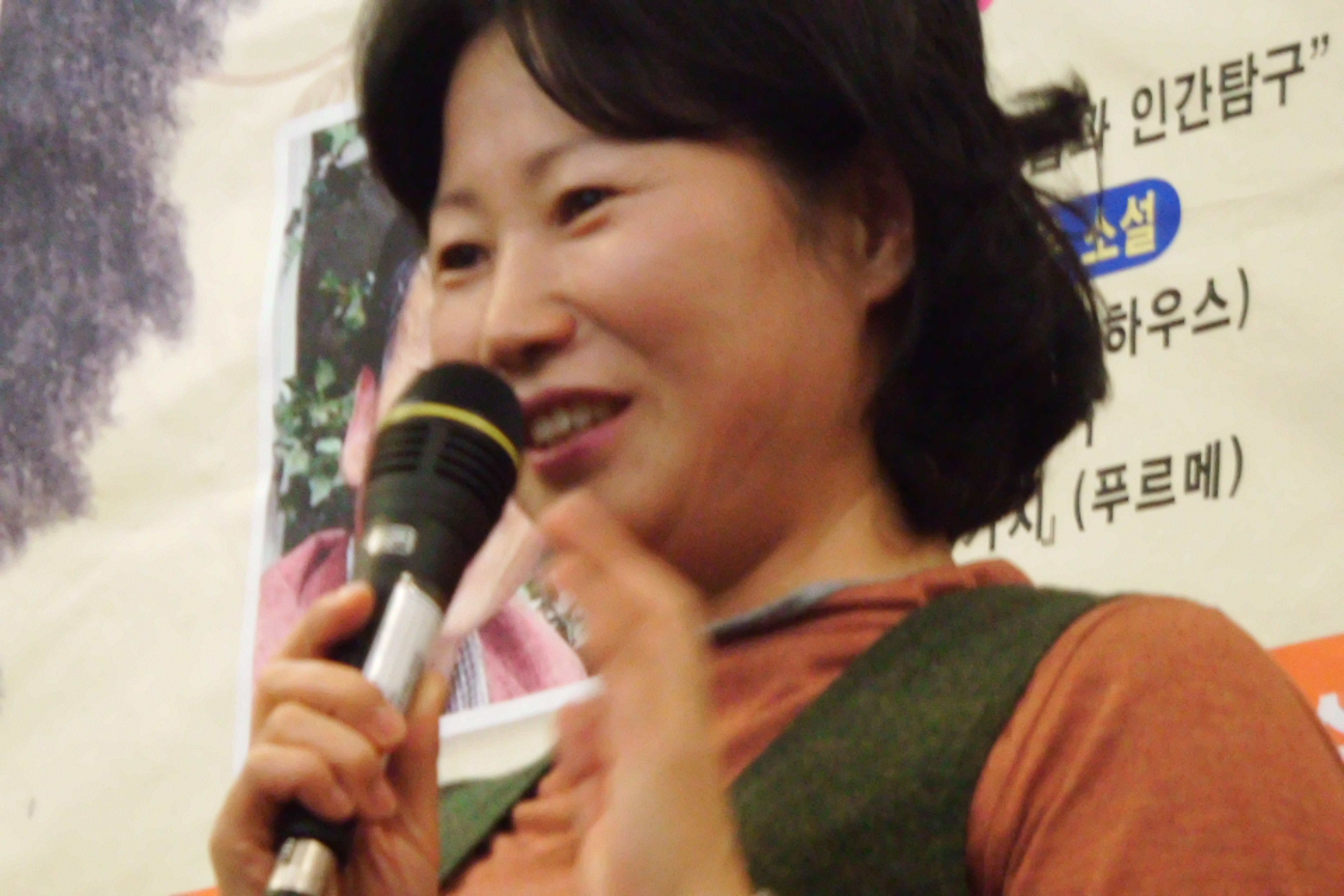
- Hwang Seon-mi in 2011
- Born: 1963 (age 62–63); Hongseong-gun, Chungcheongnam-do, South Korea
- Occupation: Writer
- Writing career
- Language: Korean
- Genre: Korean fiction

Korean name
- Hangul: 황선미
- RR: Hwang Seonmi
- MR: Hwang Sŏnmi

Hwang Seon-mi (Korean: 황선미; born 1963) is a South Korean author and professor who is best known for her fable The Hen Who Dreamed She Could Fly, which has also been made into a successful animated film in South Korea, Leafie, A Hen into the Wild.

== Life ==
Born in 1963 as the second of five children, Hwang Seon-mi was unable to attend middle school due to poverty but, thanks to a teacher who gave her a key to a classroom, she was able to go to the school and read books whenever she wanted. She enrolled in high school by taking a certificate examination and she graduated from the creative writing departments at Seoul Institute of the Arts and Gwangju University, and from graduate school at Chung-Ang University. She lives in Seoul, South Korea.

Hwang is an adjunct professor at the Faculty of Literature in the Seoul Institute of the Arts. Hwang's career as a writer began in 1995, and since then she has published nearly 30 books over various genres. She is most famous for her work The Hen Who Dreamed She Could Fly, which was also made into a movie that broke Korean box office records for animated films, earning nearly 7 billion won in its first month of release.

== Work ==
Upon its publication in 2000, The Hen Who Dreamed She Could Fly became an instant classic, remaining on bestseller lists for ten years, selling over 2 million copies, and inspiring the highest-grossing animated film in Korean history. It has also been adapted into a comic book, a play, and a musical, and has been translated into 27 languages. The author said in an interview that she had based her book around her farmer father's sad and struggling life.

Hwang's work addresses the intersections between tradition and modernity, ecology, and the search for freedom. She is most known for her fantasy work and has won the SBS Media Literary Award (2001) and the 36th Sejong Children's Literature Prize (2003).

== Awards ==
- Nong-min Literary Award (1995)
- Tamla Literary Award (1997)
- SBS Media Literary Award (2001)
- Sejong Children's Literature Prize (2003)
- The Best Book of the Year in Poland (2012)

== Works in Translation ==
- The Hen Who Dreamed She Could Fly: A Novel, translated by Chi-Young Kim (Penguin Books, 2013)
- The Dog Who Dared To Dream, translated by Chi-Young Kim (Abacus, 2016)

== Works in Korean (Original) ==
- The Hen Who Dreamed She Could Fly (마당을 나온 암탉). Paju: Sakyejul, 2000. OCLC 229245216.
- 'Occupy the Orchard' (과수원을 점령하라) Paju: Sakyejul, 2003. OCLC 53187226.
- Friends in Sun-rising Valley (2002, Sakyejul)
- The Bad Boy Stickers (나쁜 어린이 표). Woongjin Junior, 2007 OCLC 259422052
- “invited children”2001, (Woongjin Junior)
- The Secret I’m Proud of (2001, ChangBi)
- The Day of Hiding My Diary (2003, Woongjin Junior)
- The Blue Hairy Dog (2005)
- The Joy of Writing Children's Books (2006, Sakyejul)
- The Beanpole House Where Wind Stays (2010)

== See also ==
- Leafie, A Hen into the Wild
- Korean literature
- List of Korean novelists
- List of Korean female writers
