= Whale (novel) =

2004 South Korean novel

- Author: Cheon Myeong-kwan
- Language: Korean
- Publisher: Munhakdongne Publishing Group
- Publication date: December 18, 2004
- Publication place: South Korea
- ISBN: 978-89-546-2341-4

Whale (Korean: 고래, romanized: golae, lit. 'whale') is a 2004 novel by South Korean author Cheon Myeong-kwan. In 2023, the English translation by Chi-young Kim was shortlisted for the International Booker Prize. It has been classified as part of the East Asian magical realism movement by multiple reviewers and compared it to the works of Charles Dickens.

== Plot ==
Whale tells the story of three characters: Geumbok, a woman seeking to relive the thrill of seeing a whale crest in the ocean; Chunhui, Geumbok's daughter who has the ability to communicate with elephants; and a one-eyed woman who controls bees by whistling. The novel follows Geumbok as she starts various businesses and attempts to build a cinema.

== Reception ==
Christian House called the novel a "distinctly Korean take on Great Expectations" in a review for the Financial Times. House further identified the "sins of mothers" and Geumbok's unwillingness to live a mundane life as themes of the "[Korean] contemporary classic".

The judges for the International Booker Prize said "Whale is a rollercoaster adventure through Korean history and culture, a magical and grotesque epic about life and death, liberty and self-fulfilment, dried fish and bricks."
