= Pomnyun =

Korean Buddhist monk

Venerable Pomnyun

Personal life
- Website: pomnyun.com

Religious life
- Religion: Buddhism
- Founder of: Jungto Society
- School: Seon

Korean name
- Hangul: 최석호
- RR: Choe Seokho
- MR: Ch'oe Sŏkho

Dharma name
- Hangul: 법륜
- Hanja: 法輪
- RR: Beopryun
- MR: Pŏmnyun

Venerable Pomnyun Sunim (Korean: 법륜스님, Hanja: 法輪; born 11 April 1953) is a Korean Seon master, author, and activist. He is widely recognized in South Korea as the founder of the Jungto Society, a wise mentor, and one of the most respected Buddhist figures in recent history. Internationally, he is known as a peace activist and one of the four patrons of the International Network of Engaged Buddhists (INEB) alongside the Dalai Lama, Ven. Maha Somchai Kusalacitto, and Ven. Bhikshuni Chao Hwei.

Venerable Pomnyun Sunim’s vision of engaged Buddhism is centered around Jungto Society, a community of practitioners he founded in 1988 to overcome what he saw as shortcomings in the existing Buddhist order in South Korea. Since its inception, the volunteer-run community has founded four subsidiary NGOs – EcoBuddha for addressing environmental issues, Join Together Society for rendering aid in developing nations, the Peace Foundation for researching and promoting peace in the Korean peninsula, and Good Friends for protecting the rights of refugees in Asia – to reach their goal of creating Jungto, a land where individuals are happy, society is peaceful, and the environment is beautiful. Venerable Pomnyun Sunim has received various awards and recognitions for his efforts in driving these projects. Notably, in 2002, he received the Ramon Magsaysay Award for Peace and International Understanding "for his compassionate attention to the human cost of Korea's bitter division and his hopeful appeal for reconciliation." And in 2020, he became the 37th recipient of the Niwano Peace Prize “in recognition of his extraordinary humanitarian work, environmental and social activism, and his inspiring effort to build relationships of trust and goodwill between those of different faiths and cultures as a central component of his work for peace.”

Venerable Pomnyun Sunim slowly gained recognition in South Korea during the 2000s through his public Dharma Q&As (즉문즉설), in which audience members can ask Venerable Pomnyun Sunim about anything that troubles their mind, from personal issues to global conflicts and Buddhist practice. These sessions were hosted free of charge in different cities across the country, with their recordings uploaded and shared on YouTube. To date, he has hosted over 12,000 Dharma Q&As in South Korea and approximately 300 Q&As in other countries worldwide, including the 115 talks he gave during his global tour in 2014. In 2012, after his appearance on the popular Korean TV show, Healing Camp, Aren’t You Happy, he became a nationally recognized and respected figure.

He wrote and published several best sellers in South Korea, including Words of Wisdom for Newlyweds, What Is Happiness?, Things Are Good as They Are Now, The Human Buddha, and Commentary on the Diamond Sutra. One of his bestsellers, titled “Happiness (Korean: 행복)” was released in the UK under the title “What is Happiness: A Monk’s Guide to a Happy Life” in March 2025, and is scheduled to be published in the U.S. in the near future.

== Early life and education ==
In his childhood, Venerable Pomnyun Sunim dreamed of becoming a scientist. One day, while he was studying for his semester finals, he was approached by the abbot of the temple he sometimes visited. The abbot is Venerable Domoon Sunim, in direct lineage from Venerable Yongsung Sunim, one of the 33 leaders of the Korean independence movement in 1919. Trying to avoid conversation so he could return to his studies, the young Venerable Pomnyun Sunim attempted to leave quickly. Venerable Domoon Sunim then asked a series of questions to the fleeing student, changing the course of his entire life.

(Domoon) “Where did you come from?”

(Pomnyun) “I came from school.”

“Where did you come from before that?”

“I came from home.”

The questions and answers continued until they reached Venerable Pomnyun Sunim’s birth.

(Domoon) “Where were you before you were inside your mother's womb?”

(Pomnyun) “I don’t know.”

“Is that so?”

There was a brief pause.

(Domoon) “So where are you going?”

(Pomnyun) “I am going to the library.”

“Where will you go after that?”

“I will go home.”

“Where will you go after you get home?”

Venerable Domoon Sunim continued to ask until they reached Venerable Pomnyun Sunim’s death.

(Pomnyun) “...I will die.”

(Domoon) “Where will you go after that?”

“I don’t know.”

Then, Venerable Domoon Sunim shouted.

“Child! How can you be so busy when you have no idea where you’re coming from, and no idea where you’re going?”

Venerable Pomnyun Sunim recollects this as the pivotal moment that compelled him to enter monastic life as a Buddhist novice under Venerable Domoon Sunim's tutelage at the age of 16.

After becoming a monastic, he dreamed of restoring the main pagoda of Hwangnyongsa, a historic Buddhist site near where he took his vows. On weekdays, he wore regular civilian clothes and went to school. On weekends, he wore monastic robes and pushed a cart around town to collect any scrap metal he could find to contribute to rebuilding the pagoda.

Starting his second year of high school, Venerable Pomnyun Sunim borrowed Buddhism course materials from Dongguk University, a Buddhist-affiliated university in South Korea, to gain a deeper understanding of the Buddha’s teachings. Having always recognized his disciple’s aptitude and spirit, Venerable Domoon Sunim encouraged him to pursue a professorship at Dongguk University and eventually serve as a government minister for the benefit of the people. However, Venerable Pomnyun Sunim declined his teacher’s suggestion by saying, “I have studied enough at Domoon University. I will practice in this world, among the people.”

After finishing high school, he became involved in civil rights movements and Buddhist educational programs during the dictatorship of President Park Chung Hee. In 1979, Venerable Pomnyun Sunim was teaching mathematics at a private learning center when he was arrested and tortured on the suspicion that he was sending money to an activist group. He was beaten and waterboarded for several days. During the torture, he felt such rage toward his interrogators that he believed he could have killed them if given the chance. However, this hatred dissolved when he overheard one of them expressing concern to a colleague about his daughter’s exam scores and tuition fees. Venerable Pomnyun Sunim realized that even his torturers were ordinary people working to support their families and, perhaps, proud to serve the country. As the interrogation continued and he drifted toward unconsciousness, Venerable Pomnyun Sunim had a vision of a frog. In his youth, he had captured many frogs to feed chickens and had thought that the first precept of Buddhism–to abstain from taking life–was overly idealistic. But as he found himself in the situation of the frogs he had killed, he was awakened to the true meaning of the precept.

In 1980, Chun Doo-hwan’s regime began systematically oppressing the Buddhist order in South Korea, among other democratic factions, to consolidate its power base. Venerable Pomnyun Sunim was again arrested for criticizing the regime. Having witnessed the sheer helplessness of the Buddhist community against injustice, he became deeply disillusioned and left for the United States to pursue his childhood dream of becoming a scientist. In 1981, while he stayed at a Jogye Order temple in Los Angeles, he met an old monk and complained to him for hours about the state of the Korean Buddhist community.

The old monk, Venerable Seoam Sunim, answered calmly after listening to Venerable Pomnyun Sunim for over two hours, “Young man, when a person sits down to meditate next to a rice paddy and makes his mind pure, that person is a monk, and that place is a temple. That is Buddhism.”

This reply shook Venerable Pomnyun Sunim to the core. He realized, despite all his talks of reforming the Buddhist community, he had not really understood the core of Buddhism himself, and vowed to begin practicing the Buddha’s teachings instead of spending his time and energy criticizing others.

In the past, I was a warrior for democracy, fighting for social justice. I hated dictators and in protesting against them, I was prepared to sacrifice myself for the realization of justice. I was frequently voicing complaints about other people, as my mind was always in darkness. When I truly awakened to the teachings of the Buddha and could see the world as it really is, however, I realized that it did not matter who was right and who was wrong because these were just different points-of-view. Dictators, military leaders, imperialists, exclusionary religious organizations, and groups pursuing their own selfish interests.... they are not enemies to defeat, they are simply people or groups whose point-of-view is different from mine. I came to understand that from their position, they are also doing what they think is best.

After his return to South Korea in 1982, he became involved in democratization movements once again as the Dharma teacher of KBUF (Korea Buddhist University Federation). In 1988, he established the Jungto Society to unify social activism and Buddhism.

== Jungto Society ==
In 1988, at the age of 35, Venerable Pomnyun Sunim established Jungto Society with a handful of devoted members inside a bare-bones plastic greenhouse to realize “authentic, simple, and practical Buddhism” while embracing the bodhisattva ideal of Mahayana Buddhism – pursuing both personal enlightenment and service to all sentient beings. Through Jungto Society, Venerable Pomnyun Sunim sought "social activism and Buddhism to become one."

Today, the community remains entirely volunteer-run and has grown to include various non-governmental organizations that provide humanitarian relief in some of the most impoverished, underdeveloped, and/or volatile regions of the world.

Jungto Society is the parent organization that organizes a number of public Dharma Q&As with Pomnyun Sunim around the world. Additionally, the organization offers courses on Buddhism and social issues, retreats focused on awakening and meditation, an annual pilgrimage to sacred sites around India and Nepal, and various historic tours around Korea and neighboring countries. In Korea, there is also a program called the Happiness School, which shares Pomnyun Sunim’s teachings in a non-religious setting.

In 2021, a special division called Jungto International was launched to spearhead efforts to share the Dharma with a global audience. Currently, Jungto Dharma School offers an online course titled “Introduction to Buddhism” – structured into Part 1 on the Buddha Dharma and Part 2 on the Life of the Buddha – in English, Korean, Japanese, French, and German.

Over the years, Venerable Pomnyun Sunim established four NGOs under the umbrella of Jungto Society to put the Buddha’s teachings into practice. He currently serves as the chairperson of all four organizations.

Ecobuddha educates and puts into action new environmental ethics based on the Buddha’s teaching to respect all living beings. It was originally established in 1991 under the name Korean Buddhist Environmental Education Institute to raise awareness of the environmental issues that Venerable Pomnyun Sunim foresaw would become a serious problem. The organization conducted environmental education programs such as Ecological School and Life Movement Academy. In 2004, the institute was renamed Ecobuddha, and has continued to educate people about the importance of the natural environment and encourage people through community groups to practice an ecological lifestyle. Venerable Pomnyun Sunim has promoted both the Zero-Waste Campaign and the Clean Plate Campaign, leading by example and encouraging people to empty their plates at every meal, to buy and cook an appropriate amount of food without wasting, and to avoid the use of disposable products.

Perhaps the worldly issue closest to Venerable Pomnyun Sunim’s heart is how to ease the suffering of the North Korean people. It started in 1996 when he was on the Tumen River, on the border between China and North Korea. He had heard from the locals that there was a famine in North Korea, but could not believe this at first, until he saw with his own eyes the famished children on the edge of the water, too tired even to beg for food when he approached them from afar in a boat. With this painful and jolting experience, he established the Korean Buddhist Sharing Movement (KBSM) in that same year to provide humanitarian aid to North Korea. This organization later became Good Friends in 1999 and helped the North Korean people who were starving to death and had become refugees amidst a devastating food crisis. Starting with humanitarian assistance to North Korean refugees and activities to improve human rights, Good Friends started the publication of a newsletter in 2004 containing first-hand accounts and reports on North Korean residents’ lives, which became a key source of information for policymakers. Currently, the organization assists North Korean refugees who are resettling in South Korea through various programs.

The Peace Foundation was established in 2004 with the goal of achieving permanent peace on the Korean Peninsula. First, the foundation focuses on the research of policies and discussions on peace and unification. Second, it also conducts education programs, including the Peace Leadership Academy, Women’s Leadership Academy, Youth Leadership Academy, Undergraduate Leadership Academy, and Citizens Education Forum to foster citizens who will serve as leaders in various fields. Third, it carries out various unification and peace movements at home and abroad. Since 2017, the foundation has developed the Happiness School with Ven. Pomnyun Sunim program and the Happy Citizens Leadership Training program, promoting nationwide happiness initiatives that anyone can participate in online.

Join Together Society (JTS) is an international NGO committed to humanitarian relief with three core principles: the hungry should have food, the sick should be treated, and children should be educated. Operating primarily in Asia, JTS works to eradicate famine, disease, and illiteracy. With special consultative status from the UN ECOSOC, JTS is recognized globally for its impactful humanitarian work. Venerable Pomnyun Sunim’s humanitarian work through JTS started in 1994 when JTS and the residents of Dungeshwari began building a school together: the community provided land and labor, while JTS supplied materials and expertise. Classes started outdoors, and in January 1995, Sujata Academy opened with 120 students. Currently, the enrollment is over 700.

After discovering that the people of North Korea were suffering from starvation during one of his historical tours in China, Venerable Pomnyun has worked tirelessly to deliver aid to everyday North Koreans. In 1997, JTS initiated emergency food aid to the most vulnerable population in North Hamkyung Province, which was experiencing severe food shortages. JTS provided food, necessities, and school materials to 12,000 people in 53 facilities in North Korea until 2012, when the South Korean government stopped allowing humanitarian aid to North Korea. Then, in 2019, JTS provided an emergency food aid of 10,000 tons of corn to North Korean orphanages and the mining areas of North Korea that were experiencing severe food shortages due to the ongoing international economic sanctions.

When Venerable Pomnyun Sunim received the Magsaysay Award in 2002, Archbishop Antonio Ledesma asked him to help establish peace on Mindanao Island, which was rife with religious and ethnic conflicts. JTS surveyed remote villages in Mindanao and began building schools in cooperation with the residents. So far, JTS has built over 70 schools, including special education schools. In addition, JTS has also built water tanks to solve the water shortage issue and operated a model farm to help increase the income of the residents. All these efforts have contributed to establishing peace on the Island.

When over 700,000 Rohingyas fled to refugee camps in Bangladesh, Venerable Pomnyun Sunim sent volunteers to provide emergency food aid to the refugees. JTS provided two rounds of rice and essential items, such as mosquito nets and blankets, to the refugees in October 2017 and January 2018. Then, upon the request of the UN World Food Programme (WFP) to provide gas stoves to address refugees’ difficulties with cooking, JTS delivered 100,000 stoves in January 2022. It improved the health of refugees, enhanced the safety of women and children, and restored the natural environment in the refugee camp.

After the devastating earthquake in Turkiye and Syria in 2023, Venerable Pomnyun Sunim and JTS volunteers traveled to the region to provide emergency food relief to households affected by the earthquake. When he visited Syria at the border region and witnessed the destruction of a large school, he signed an agreement with White Helmets, a Syrian volunteer organization, to fund the reconstruction of the school. The construction of the school, which accommodates 4,000 students, was completed in October 2024.

In 2024, Venerable Pomnyun Sunim began to survey remote areas of Bhutan to improve local living conditions and assess the potential for a sustainable development project that could become a global model. Since the participation of the local people and government officials is essential, Ven Pomnyun Sunim conducted a workshop focused on sustainable development before initiating a pilot project. After completing the pilot project, he signed an MOU for a three-year sustainable development project with the Royal Government of Bhutan.

== Awards ==
Domestic Awards
Year	Award
1998	Kyobo Environmental Education Award, Kyobo Foundation of Education and Culture, Republic of Korea
2000	Manhae Propagation Award, The Society for the Promotion and Practice of Manhae's Thoughts, Republic of Korea
2006	DMZ (Demilitarized Zone) Peace Prize, Gangwon Province, Republic of Korea
2007	National Reconciliation and Cooperation Award, Council for Reconciliation and Cooperation, Republic of Korea
2011	POSCO TJ Park Community Development and Philanthropy Prize, POSCO Chungam Foundation, Republic of Korea
2011	Reunification and Culture Award, Reunification and Culture Research Institute, Segye Daily, Republic of Korea
2018	Order of Civil Merit, Moran Medal, Korean Government, Republic of Korea

International Awards
Year	Award
2002	Ramon Magsaysay Peace and International Understanding Award, Ramon Magsaysay Award Foundation, Philippines
2015	Kripasaran Award, Bengal Association, India
2020	Niwano Peace Prize, Niwano Peace Foundation, Japan

== Books (in English) ==
- Prayer: Letting Go. Jungto Publishing. 2014. ISBN 978-89-85961-84-4.
- True Wisdom: Ten Precious Guidelines from Bowang Sammaeron for a Happy Life. Jungto Publishing. 2013. ISBN 978-89-85961-80-6.
- True Freedom: The one Thing that Happy People Have in Common. Jungto Publishing. 2011. ISBN 978-89-85961-68-4.
- True Happiness: Here and Now. Jungto Publishing. 2010. ISBN 978-89-85961-64-6.
- Awakening. Jungto Publishing. 2015. ISBN 978-89-85961-98-1.
- A Monk's Reply to Everyday Problems (Korean ed.). Jongno Publishing. 2018. ISBN 979-11-87297-16-1.
- Why Am I Anxious. Independently Published. 2025. ISBN 979-82-90178-93-6.
- What is Happiness?: A Monk's Guide to a Happy Life. Andrews McMeel Publishing. 2026. ISBN 979-8881605643.

== See also ==
- Buddhism in Korea
- Buddhism in the United States
- List of peace activists
