= The Hen Who Dreamed She Could Fly =

2000 novel by Hwang Seon-mi

- Author: Hwang Seon-mi
- Original title: 마당을 나온 암탉
- Language: Korean
- Publisher: Shinchosha, Penguin Random House
- Publication date: 2000
- Publication place: Korea

The Hen Who Dreamed She Could Fly (Korean: 마당을 나온 암탉; RR: Madangeul Naon Amtak) is a 2000 novel by Hwang Seon-mi.

== Plot ==
Sprout, a hen who lay eggs on a barn longs to be free from her cage. Sprout becomes depressed and eventually stops eating and is taken out of the farm by the owner only to be thrown into a hole.

Sprout gets woken up at night by a mallard duck named "Straggler" who warns her about a weasel that planned to eat her. Eventually, Sprout leaves the farm and hears a scream from a bush. She goes over only to discover an egg there.

Straggler appears again and takes care of Sprout while she cares for the egg. Right before the egg hatches, Straggler sacrifices himself to the weasel so it will have a full stomach and not eat them. A baby mallard hatches from the egg and is named Baby by Sprout. She then takes care of him like a son.

Baby eventually grows up to be a strong mallard duck and joins a flock of mallards for the winter as their leader. Sprout then sees she has done everything she could for Baby, then ultimately allows Weasel to eat her.

== Publication ==
The book was first published by Sakyejul Publishing (사계절출판사) on May 29, 2000.

== Critical reception ==
The novel received positive reviews from South China Morning Post's John Kang and The Guardian, with the latter praising the story's originality. Publishers Weekly concluded the book would "appeal to readers of self-help".

== Animated film adaptation ==
An animated film adaptation of the same name was released on July 28, 2011.

== English translation ==
The book was translated into English by Chi-young Kim and published in 2013.

The book became the first work by a Korean author to reach the number one spot on the UK bestseller list within a month of its English-language release.
