= Leafie, A Hen into the Wild =

- Korean theatrical release poster
- Hangul: 마당을 나온 암탉
- RR: Madangeul naon amtak
- MR: Madangŭl naon amt'ak
- Directed by: Oh Sung-yoon
- Written by: Na Hyun; Kim Eun-jung
- Based on: The Hen Who Dreamed She Could Fly by Hwang Sun-mi
- Produced by: Shim Jae-myung; Lee Eun; Son Gwang-ik; Kim Seon-gu
- Starring: Moon So-ri; Yoo Seung-ho; Choi Min-sik
- Cinematography: Lee Jong-hyuk
- Edited by: Kim Hyeong-ju; Kim Jae-bum; Kim Sang-bum
- Music by: Lee Ji-soo
- Production company: Myung Films
- Distributed by: Lotte Entertainment
- Release date: July 28, 2011
- Running time: 93 minutes 87 minutes (English version)
- Country: South Korea
- Language: Korean
- Box office: US$11,094,345

Leafie, A Hen into the Wild (Korean: 마당을 나온 암탉; RR: Madangeul naon amtak), also called Daisy, A Hen into the Wild in English-speaking countries, is a 2011 South Korean animated comedy-drama film based on the book of the same name. It depicts the freedom, will and instinctive motherly love of a hen as she raises an adopted duckling. The film made box office history by drawing over 2.2 million viewers, the largest audience for a home-grown animated film in South Korea. It also received widespread critical acclaim upon release.

== Plot ==
Leafie (Note: 잎싹; Ipssag, 잎의; Ip-ui) lives on a chicken farm with other egg-laying hens in battery cages. She dreams of being a mother, despite her inability to incubate her own eggs. Dreaming of having children, she escapes the farm, feigning death and tricking the farmer into dumping her outside but is threatened by a one-eyed weasel (Note: 애꾸눈; Aeggunun). She is saved by a mallard named Wanderer (Note: 나그네; Nagnae, 문외한; Munoehan; lit. 'outsider') who traps One-Eye in the farmer's wheelbarrow. Leafie tries to join a troupe of barnyard animals residing outside the farm, but gets into a huge argument with their rooster that refuses to allow her into his group, insisting that she would only spend her life laying eggs. Leafie leaves the farm and into the wilderness, meeting Mr. Otter (Note: 달수; Dalsu, 수달 씨; Sudal Ssi), who helps her find a home on Wanderer's behalf. Leafie meets Wanderer again, and discovers he has a mate, whom One-Eye kills later that night, leaving Wanderer distraught.

At Wanderer's nest, Leafie finds a single egg, which Wanderer leaves in Leafie's care as he departs to confront One-Eye. He pleads Leafie to take his unborn child to the Everglades, believing she will understand its purpose there. That night, One-Eye returns, and Wanderer engages her in a fight to the death in which One-Eye prevails, upsetting Leafie. The egg then hatches into a duckling that imprints on Leafie. She adopts the duckling, naming him Greenie (Note: 초록이; Chorogi, 푸른; Pureun), before setting off for the Everglades. As Leafie raises Greenie, Mr. Otter teaches him to swim, with help from a bat and owl to teach him to fly. Meanwhile, Mr. Otter accidentally confesses that the local waterfowl are unaccepting of Leafie in their community. She then meets up with Greenie, who had been bullied by a group of mandarin ducks and blames Leafie for him being an outcast before running away.

Subsequently, Mr. Otter comforts Leafie by telling her about Wanderer's backstory: he was a flock guard that broke his wing fighting One-Eye and also permanently blinded one of her eyes, before being captured by the farmer and escaping. Meanwhile, Greenie is lured to the farm by four white ducks before being caught by the farmer, who intends on clipping his wings. To distract the farmer and rescue Greenie, Leafie and Mr. Otter release all the hens from their cages as a distraction, then Mr. Otter scares off the farmer and frees Greenie. However, the rooster stops them, calling Leafie a disgrace to the chickens. In anger, Leafie charges at him, knocking away his comb, making the animals discover it is fake; one of the white ducks decides to replace him as the troupe leader, helping Leafie, Greenie and Mr. Otter escape. After Mr. Otter departs, One-Eye pins Greenie onto a tree; the two plummet over a cliff as the tree snaps away. Leafie laments Greenie's apparent sacrifice, but Greenie escapes by successfully flying as One-Eye climbs back up.

A flock of mallards soon arrive in autumn, from whom Greenie learns of an upcoming contest to nominate the new flock guard upon realizing Wanderer's words. Horrified, the ducks flee from Greenie, seeing the string around his leg from his previous encounter with the farmer, but Leafie reassures Greenie's entrance, removing the string in time. Greenie returns to the flock and announces his participation, quickly forming a rivalry with another duck named Red Head. Greenie recalls the words of his mentors, winning the contest and becoming flock guard, while the flock praises him as a hero.

Leafie finds a litter of weasel kits while the rooster finds a home with Mr. Otter after escaping and accompany with ducks. Greenie tries to find Leafie but comes across One-Eye again, saving a female duck from her. Their scuffle lands them ahead of the litter as One-Eye prepares to kill Greenie, but One-Eye, angered, stops upon seeing Leafie standing by the kits, and threatens her not to come near. Leafie finds that the kits are One-Eye's children, making her suspect that One-Eye only killed to provide food for them. After agreeing to not harm the kits in exchange for Greenie's life, Leafie discovers that One-Eye, malnourished from the winter, is unable to lactate for her children.

When the duck flock prepare to leave the Everglades, so Leafie and Greenie bid each other farewell. As Leafie contemplates how she would have learned flying herself, One-Eye corners her at the cliff. Leafie decides to knowingly let herself to be killed and eaten by One-Eye so that her children will not starve. The movie ends as Greenie flies with his flock.

== Characters ==
Leafie/Yipsak/Sprout/Daisy Voiced by: Moon So-ri (Korean), Stacey DePass (English)

Greenie/Chorok Head/Green-Top/Willie Voiced by: Han Shin-jeong (young) & Yoo Seung-ho (adult) (Korean), Bryn McAuley (young) & Toby Proctor (adult) (English)

Wanderer/Nagnae/Straggler/Wilson Voiced by: Choi Min-sik (Korean), Ryan Hollyman (English)

Rooster Voiced by: Um Sang-hyun (Korean), Juan Chioran (English)

Mayor or Mr. Otter Voiced by: Park Chul-min (Korean), Christian Potenza (English)

One-eyed Weasel Voiced by: Kim Sang-hyeon (Korean), Stacey DePass (English)

Red Head/Ace Voiced by: Sa Seong-ung (Korean), L. Dean Ifill (English)

Chirpie Voiced by: Jeon Suk-kyeong (Korean), Bryn McAuley (English)

Owl Voiced by: Seo Seung-won (Korean), L. Dean Ifill (English)

Bat Voiced by: Hong Beom-gi (Korean), Ryan Hollyman (English)

Wanderer's Mate Voiced by: Kim Ji-hye (Korean)

Bully Voiced by: Ron Basch (English)

Blade Voiced by: Drew Nelson (English)

Flock Leader Voiced by: Ryan Hollyman (English)

The Farmer Voiced by: Walker Boone (English)

Dol, Mee, Rae and Toe Voiced by: Shoshana Sperling (English; Dol), Angela Besharah (English; Rae), Drew Nelson (English; Mee), Catherine Disher (English; Toe)

The Dog Voiced by: Ron Basch (English)

The Hens Voiced by: Shoshana Sperling (English; Barn hen), Catherine Disher (English; Mother hen)

== Production ==
Director Oh Sung-yoon struggled for more than twenty years as an animator under adverse economic circumstances before finally debuting with this feature film. Originally titled YIPSAK - A Chicken Wild, the movie took Myung Films six years (three years for pre-production including scriptwriting, and one and a half year for storyboard) and ₩3 billion (US$2.8 million) to produce.

Shim Jae-myung (also known as Jaime Shim), the head of Myung Films, which co-produced Leafie in conjunction with the local animation studio Odolttogi, said that it was her experience with major motion pictures that made her want to produce animated films that could compete with those from Hollywood and Japan. "And as a woman and mother, the plot touched my heart," she said. "Many people were doubtful about whether the film would be a success, but I believed in the power of the novel."

When asked what they did to distinguish their film from films by the world's major studios, director Oh said he and the crew focused on making the visual effects as beautiful as possible. "Most of my staff and I majored in painting, and we chose to make the film two-dimensional, so that the entire product looks like a beautiful picture," Oh said. Though the sharply drawn foreground characters have an international look, the gentler backgrounds seem typically Korean in their use of landscape and flora (with the Upo wetlands in the south of the country inspiring the everglades in which much of the action takes place). "In addition to that, we have many quality animators on staff who draw for Pixar and Disney in Korea." Disney, Pixar and DreamWorks often hire small- and medium-sized Korean animation studios to work on their illustrations.

== Soundtrack ==
The South Korean and English versions each contain a different soundtrack. The South Korean soundtrack is composed by Lee Ji-soo while the English soundtrack is composed by Patrick Cannell. The former was released on CD in 2011, consisting of 22 tracks.

== Reception ==
Historically South Korean animated features have struggled to draw viewers. This prolonged slump is evidenced by My Beautiful Girl, Mari (2001), Wonderful Days (2003), Oseam (2003), Aachi & Ssipak (2005), and Yobi, the Five Tailed Fox (2006) which all performed dismally at the box office. No domestic animated film had ever achieved 1 million viewers.

Leafie went on to rake in more than 2.2 million tickets, while recouping its production budget in just four weeks. It has become South Korea's most successful animated film since the country's first feature-length cartoon, A Story of Hong Gildong (1967).

== Awards ==
Leafie won Best Sitges Family Film Diploma at the 2011 Sitges Film Festival in Spain as well as the award for Best Animated Feature Film at the 2011 Asia Pacific Screen Awards held in Australia.

For her contribution to the popularization of Korean animation, producer Shim Jae-myung (a.k.a. Jaime Shim) CEO of Myung Films won a Special Mention at the 2011 Korean Association of Film Critics Awards.

== Localization ==
=== English version ===
Racking up numerous sales at the American Film Market, the film was picked up by Toronto-based 108 Media Group for distribution in English-speaking countries including Canada, U.S., Australia, Ireland, U.K. and New Zealand and was retitled Daisy: A Hen Into the Wild. It was released direct-to-DVD in the United States by Olive Films and in the United Kingdom by Signature Entertainment in 2014, and had also been broadcast on television on Starz Kids and Family. The English version was partly re-edited from the original version, with six minutes (such as a bit with the hens laying their eggs and One-Eye tearing up as she lunges at Leafie) being removed, the character names being changed (Leafie's name was changed to Daisy, Greenie was changed to Willie, Wanderer was changed to Wilson and Red Head was changed to Ace), and a new score composed by Patrick Cannell replacing the original score.

=== Other territories ===
Leafie also sold to German-speaking territories via Ascot Elit and Brazil's Conquest Filmes. It has so far secured deals for 46 countries around Asia, Europe and the Middle East after going on sale at Busan's Asian Film Market, Cannes's MIPCOM and Rome's Business Street.

It became the first Korean animated film to play at Chinese theaters, opening at 3,000 screens, which is over one-third of the country's total. Clearly elated at the film's warm reception by the Chinese media, director Oh said he hoped this breaks new ground as investors traditionally judge projects based on their appeal to viewers in English-speaking countries. "It's time to change the standard," he said. "In the future, I'll focus more on the cultural values of the animation rather than giving too much emphasis to the business aspect."

== Stage adaptation ==
A stage play based on the book and film ran from June 22 to September 2, 2012 at the COEX Art Hall in Seoul.
