= Please Look After Mom =

Novel by Kyung-sook Shin

- English Paperback Reprint Cover
- Author: Kyung-sook Shin
- Original title: 엄마를 부탁해
- Translator: Chi-young Kim
- Language: Korean
- Genre: novel
- Publisher: Changbi
- Publication date: 2008
- Publication place: South Korea
- English publication date: 2011
- Awards: Man Asian Literary Prize

- Please Look After Mom
- Hangul: 엄마를 부탁해
- RR: Eommareul butakhae
- MR: Ŏmmarŭl put'akhae

Please Look After Mom (Korean: 엄마를 부탁해) is a novel by South Korean author Kyung-sook Shin. It sold a million copies within 10 months of release in 2009 in South Korea, is critically acclaimed internationally and the English translation by Chi-young Kim won the 2011 Man Asian Literary Prize. The novel has been adapted as a stage play and musical.

As of April 2012, the book has sold two million copies and the publisher has printed a 10,000-copy special edition to commemorate the achievement. The book was also chosen by Oprah to be one of her "18 Books to Watch for in April 2011 and by Amazon as one of its "Best Books of the Month: April 2011".

== Plot ==
When sixty-nine-year-old Park So-Nyo is separated from her husband among the crowds of the Seoul subway station, her family begins a desperate search to find her. Yet as long-held secrets and private sorrows begin to reveal themselves, they are forced to wonder: how well did they actually know the woman they called Mom? The novel explores the loss, self-recrimination, and in some cases, self-discovery caused by the mother's disappearance. The novel also considers themes related to the self-sacrifice of mothers in general (and in Korea in particular), the relationship between memories of the past and realities of the present, and the chameleonic aspects of identity. The novel explores the conflict between the real self and the way people live their life, having lost the opportunities to obtain their aims, is also put forth to the readers.

== Style ==
The style of Please Look After Mom is a bit unusual, as Julie Hunt noted in booklist, "Composed almost entirely in second-person narration, the writing is sharp, biting, and intensely moving." The author drifts the narration from reality to memories and memories to reality.

== Characters ==
- Park So-nyo - mother of four children
- Hyong-chol - So-nyo's oldest son
- Chi-hon - So-nyo's eldest daughter
- Yu-bin - Chi-hon's boyfriend
- Yun Chin Hyong-chol's daughter
- Yun Kyun - So-nyo's brother in law
- Hong Tae-hee: a director of an orphanage whom she donated to

== Stage play cast ==
- Jung Hye-sun - Park Son-yo
- Sim Yang-hong - Mr Yun
- Kil Yong-woo - Young-chul
- Seo Yee-sook - Ji-yeon

== Reception ==
The book was also chosen by Oprah to be one of her "18 Books to Watch for in April 2011 and by Amazon as one of its "Best Books of the Month: April 2011".

Additionally, Please Look After Mom won the Man Asian Literary Prize in 2011.

== Translations ==
Language	Title	Translator	Year of Publication	Publisher	ISBN
Arabic	أرجوك اعتني بأمي	Muhammad Najib (محمد نجيب)	2021	Dar Altanweer	ISBN 9786144721407
