= Apartment Women =

2024 novel by Gu Byeong-mo

- Author: Gu Byeong-mo
- Translator: Kim Chi-young
- Genre: Literary fiction
- Publisher: Hanover Square Press
- Publication date: December 3, 2024
- Pages: 224
- ISBN: 978-1335050076

Apartment Women is a 2024 novel by Gu Byeong-mo translated by Kim Chi-young and published by Hanover Square Press. It was included in The New York Times' Editors Choice on December 12, 2024.

== Synopsis ==
The novel is set in a futuristic, experimental living community on the outskirts of Seoul called the Dream Future Pilot Communal Apartments. One new resident, Yojin, moves into the apartment complex with her husband and daughter—with the condition that she must bear two more children within a decade. Over time, as Yojin settles into the apartment complex, she begins to meet the other women living there.

== Critical reception ==
Publishers Weekly called the book a "piercing domestic drama" and concluded that "Gu's quick pacing tends to merely skim the surface, but as the women's frustrations reach a boiling point, she keenly portrays the toll taken by gendered expectations. This is a perceptive novel of motherhood's double binds." Library Journal's verdict was:

Via breezy, engaging storytelling, Gu's realist novel explores the roles of women, with protagonists who discuss parenting and work-life balance while contending with meeting social, cultural, and societal mores. Readers will eagerly follow this story through to see which couples, if any, succeed in meeting the concept behind this distinctive living situation. A good pick for book clubs.

Marie-Helene Bertino, in The New York Times, stated that "The novel expertly renders women's inner suffering" and said "Gu is an exciting writer in the contemporary renaissance in Korean art. Like the 2024 Nobel laureate Han Kang, Gu gives voice to the rich inner lives of women grappling with misogyny."

Julie Dam, writing for The Honey POP, said the book "addresses a lot of real societal issues and questions a lot of the norms expected of the modern mother." In particular, Dam lauded the book's skillful, relatable dialogue between its women characters.

PEN America said that the book "offers a sharp critique of gender roles, parenthood, and shared responsibilities, inviting readers to reflect on the cultural expectations of women in South Korea."

== Background ==
Gu stated that she didn't have to rely on stylistic, technical devices in order to drive her story forward, as "It was more than enough to pull from the unfair treatment I’ve experienced as a woman. Because I personally remember each and every sexist phrase and violent situation I routinely encountered, I had no problem with taking and incorporating them into the story." She also reflected upon the middling success of recent developments in South Korea to provide housing subsidies and benefits to families that have a certain number of children.
