= Your Republic Is Calling You =

Korean novel by Kim Young-ha

Your Republic is Calling You (Korean: 빛의 제국; Hanja: 빛의 帝國; RR: Bichui jeguk) is a Korean novel written by Kim Young-ha. Borrowing the title of René Magritte’s series of paintings, Empire of Light, Bichui jeguk is about a North Korean spy stationed in South Korea and the day he is summoned back to North Korea. The novel both overviews the societal changes that Korea went through from the 1980s to the 2000s and follows the fate of a man whose fate becomes wholly unknown to him. In 2016, Bichui jeguk was jointly adapted into a play by the National Theater of Korea and the Centre Dramatique National Orléans and performed in both South Korea and France. The plot follows Kim Gi-yeong, a spy who has lived as a South Korean citizen for twenty years, as he is ordered to erase all traces of his life and return to North Korea within 24 hours.

== Title ==
The title Bichui jeguk (literally ‘Empire of Light’) was borrowed from a series of paintings by René Magritte titled The Empire of Light. Unlike Magritte's other paintings, in which the absurdity of things lays in plain sight, one has to look closely at the paintings of The Empire of Light to notice that things are amiss. In particular, the paintings all depict a paradoxical scene of a nighttime street, lit by a street lamp, under a bright afternoon sky. Kim Young-ha has said that the world of Bichui jeguk is similar to René's world of intermingling light and dark. And indeed, just as in The Empire of Light, the main character of Bichui jeguk is a man who is either alone in the dark or alone in the light and constantly switching back and forth in between.

== Plot summary ==
In Bichui jeguk, one man must erase himself, the last twenty years of his life, and all traces that he ever existed, and he must do it all within a single day. Kim Gi-yeong—or rather Kim Seong-hun, as he was known in North Korea—spent four years training for his mission in South Korea while studying English at Pyeongyang University for Foreign Languages. In 1984, at the age of 21, Kim Gi-yeong is deployed to South Korea as a spy, and in 1986, following his orders from the party, Gi-yeong enrolls in a South Korean university and infiltrates the student-lead democracy movements. But ten years later when the agent in charge of Gi-yeong's mission in the South falls from power, the orders being sent to him cease. Another ten years pass, and Gi-yeong is living a normal live as a 41-year-old South Korean citizen. But then one day, he receives an email; it's a message from Pyeongyang, ordering him to erase all traces of his life in South Korea and return to North Korea in the next 24 hours. Having believed that all records of him in North Korea had been erased, Gi-yeong is dumbfounded. But for his survival, he must follow the orders. From the moment Gi-yeong reads this email, the novel thrusts forward through the next 24 hours.

== Themes ==
Bichui jeguk retraces the trajectory of Korean society from the 1980s to the 2000s and the changes in the lives Koreans that came over that time span. From the aspect of political climate, national system, and the thought patterns of citizens, the South Korea of the 1980s that Kim Gi-yeong encounters is not much different from the North Korea of the 1980s. As one example of their similarity, you can take the passage in which Gi-yeong says that, among the subjects he had to be tested in to enter a South Korean university, it was “National Ethics” that was the easiest. In other words, South Korea’s “National Ethics,” which prioritized the nation and society, was similar to the North Korean system which prioritizes the party and its leader.

In contrast to this, the consumer capitalist South Korea of the 2000s is a far cry from the 80s. And Gi-yeong—a former North Korean spy who infiltrated student movements but now leads a monotonous life as a fully assimilated citizen in a capitalist society—makes this contrast even more palpable for the reader. And while Gi-yeong believes that he is in control of his own life, in reality he is inundated with daily life and desensitized to everything. And the way in which Gi-yeong's life is completely turned upside down by a single email signifies just how blind humans are to a wholly unpredictable future. Indeed, the harder Gi-yeong tries to understand the ordeal he finds himself in, the only thing that he learns is that he knows nothing, showing that humans are always at the whim of destiny, not matter how hard they struggle against it.

== Style ==
Kim Young-ha has stated that “Strictly speaking, Bichui jeguk isn’t trying to say anything,” and that, “At the deepest level, Bichui jeguk is actually trying to challenge the concept of ‘trying to say something.’” Indeed, this process of destroying the belief that we can control our lives is conveyed not just through the novel’s content, but through its form, as well. In the never-ending flow of various episodes, it is hard to find causes or logical necessities. This style is reflected in the mode of existence of a modern person who lives and experiences the fragmented world as they live a daily life that was given to them and which they cannot master. Bichui jeguk also reminds one of a Greek tragedy in the way its main character struggles to understand all of reality and become the master of their fate, despite the fact they cannot understand the full nature of the circumstances they find themselves in. At the same time, employing elements such as black humor, cynicism, and a self-aware parody of a movie chase scene, Kim Young-ha retains his unique style in this work. In this sense, Bichui jeguk can be called a modern adaption of Greek tragedy.

== Reception ==
Because of the way it reflects on Korean society through a character who has experienced both the South Korean and North Korean systems, Bichui jeguk has been compared to Choi In-hun’s 1960 novel, Gwangjang (광장 Square). Whereas Gwangjang deals with the early stages of the division of the Korean peninsula from the 50s to the 60s, Bichui jeguk deals with the neo-liberalization of South Korean society from the 1980s to the 2000s. Unlike Gwangjang, in which the main character contemplates which ideology to which to subscribe, the protagonist of Bichui jeguk is not concerned by ideology because ideology has already completely lost to everyday desires. In this way, Bichui jeguk has been lauded as a piece that signals a “post-ideological era.” Despite these accolades, some have criticized that Kim Young-ha's deterministic worldview led to overly cynical and negative depictions of South Korea's activist groups and their decline.

== Adaptions ==
In 2016, Bichui jeguk was adapted into a play bearing the same title by the combined efforts of the National Theater of Korea and the Centre Dramatique National Orléans. The play was performed in March and May of the same year in Korea and France, respectively. In Korea, English and French subtitles were provided for the foreign audiences in attendance. Several French staff participated in the making of the play. In particular, Arthur Nauzyceil was in charge of directing and Valerie Mrejen handled the adaption. In addition to this, Pierre-Alain Giraud from the creative team brought to life on stage the both familiar and unfamiliar daily life of Seoul that was depicted in the novel. And Gaspard Yukievich designed the grayscale costumes, expressing the image of humans that become ever more blurry as they exist in a large world. The play also created excitement as it was the return to theatre for the actress Moon So-ri.

== Bibliography ==
=== Editions ===
Kim, Young-ha. Bichui jeguk. Moonhakdongne, 2006.

=== Translations ===
<<빛의 제국>>, 문학동네, 2006 / Your Republic is Calling You. Mariner Books, 2010. (Chi-Young Kim, tr.)

<<빛의 제국>>, 문학동네, 2006 / L'EMPIRE DES LUMIÈRES. Philippe Picquier, 2009.

<<빛의 제국>>, 문학동네, 2006 / IM REICH DER LICHTER, Heyne, 2008.

<<빛의 제국>>, 문학동네, 2006 / Imperium Świateł, Kwiaty Orientu, 2010.

<<빛의 제국>>, 문학동네, 2006 / L'impero delle luci, METROPOLI d'Asia, 2013.

<<빛의 제국>>, 문학동네, 2006 / Říše světla, ARGO, 2013.

<<빛의 제국>>, 문학동네, 2006 / Империя на светлината, Sluntse, 2017.

<<빛의 제국>>, 문학동네, 2006 / 光の帝国, 二見書房, 2008.

<<빛의 제국>>, 문학동네, 2006 / 光之帝国, 人民文学出版社, 2012.

<<빛의 제국>>, 문학동네, 2006 / 光之帝國, 漫遊者文化, 2019.

== Awards ==
Manhae Prize for Literature (2007)
