= Cheon Myeong-kwan =

South Korean novelist and screenwriter (born 1964)

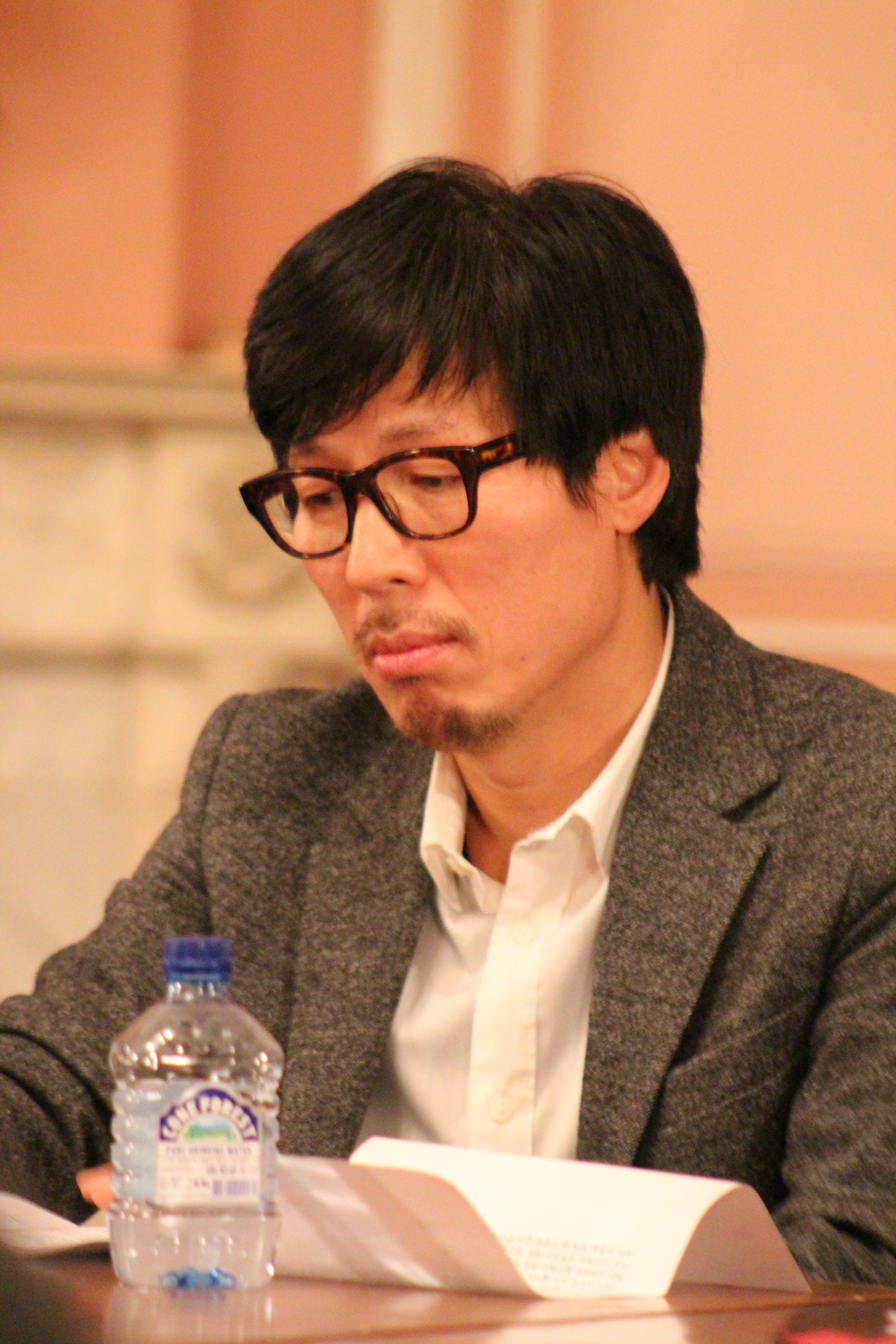
- Born: 1 January 1964 (age 62); Yongin, South Korea
- Occupations: Novelist, Screenwriter

Korean name
- Hangul: 천명관
- Hanja: 千明官
- RR: Cheon Myeonggwan
- MR: Ch'ŏn Myŏnggwan

Cheon Myeong-kwan (Korean: 천명관; Hanja: 千明官, the romanization preferred by the author according to LTI Korea) (born 1964) is a South Korean novelist, screenwriter and film director. His novel Modern Family was adapted into the film Boomerang Family in 2013. The translation of his novel Whale was shortlisted for the 2023 International Booker Prize.

== Life ==
Cheon was born in Yongin, Gyeonggi Province, in 1964. He debuted in 2003 with the short story "Frank and I." Before becoming a writer, he worked for a movie production company and wrote screenplays for films like Gun and Gun (1995, 총잡이) and The Great Chef (1999, 북경반점). Although he wrote numerous screenplays and prepared to appear in a few films, production on these movies was suspended.

Cheon turned to writing fiction in an attempt to find another means of making money, spurred on by the words of his sibling, who said he should write novels instead of screenplays that would never be made into movies. The result was "Frank and I," an absurd and hilarious story about the narrator's unemployed husband who goes to Canada to meet his cousin Frank and ends up meeting Frank, a Los Angeles gang leader. With this short story, he won the Munhakdongne New Writer Award. Only a year later in 2004, he won the 10th Munhakdongne Novel Award for his first novel Whale (고래), a wry epic tale about a country girl who transforms into an entrepreneur in the city. Modern Family (고령화 가족), featuring a motley crew of family members, is narrated by a middle-aged son who has been unemployed for the past 10 years since his debut film flopped. With these two works, he jumpstarted his writing career, receiving widespread attention from critics and readers alike as a unique and invigorating presence on the Korean literary scene. My Uncle, Bruce Lee is a chronicle of an uncle as seen through his nephew's eyes.

== Works in English ==
- Modern Family (2015)
- Homecoming (2015)
- Whale (2023)

== Works ==
Novels:

- My Uncle, Bruce Lee (2012)
- Modern Family (2010)
- Whale (2004)

Short stories:

- Cheerful Maid Marisa (2006)
- "Frank and I"

Films:

- Hot Blooded (2022)

== Awards ==
- The 10th Munhakdongne Novel Award (2004)
- Munhakdongne New Writer Award (2003)
