= Gu Byeong-mo =

South Korean writer (born 1976)

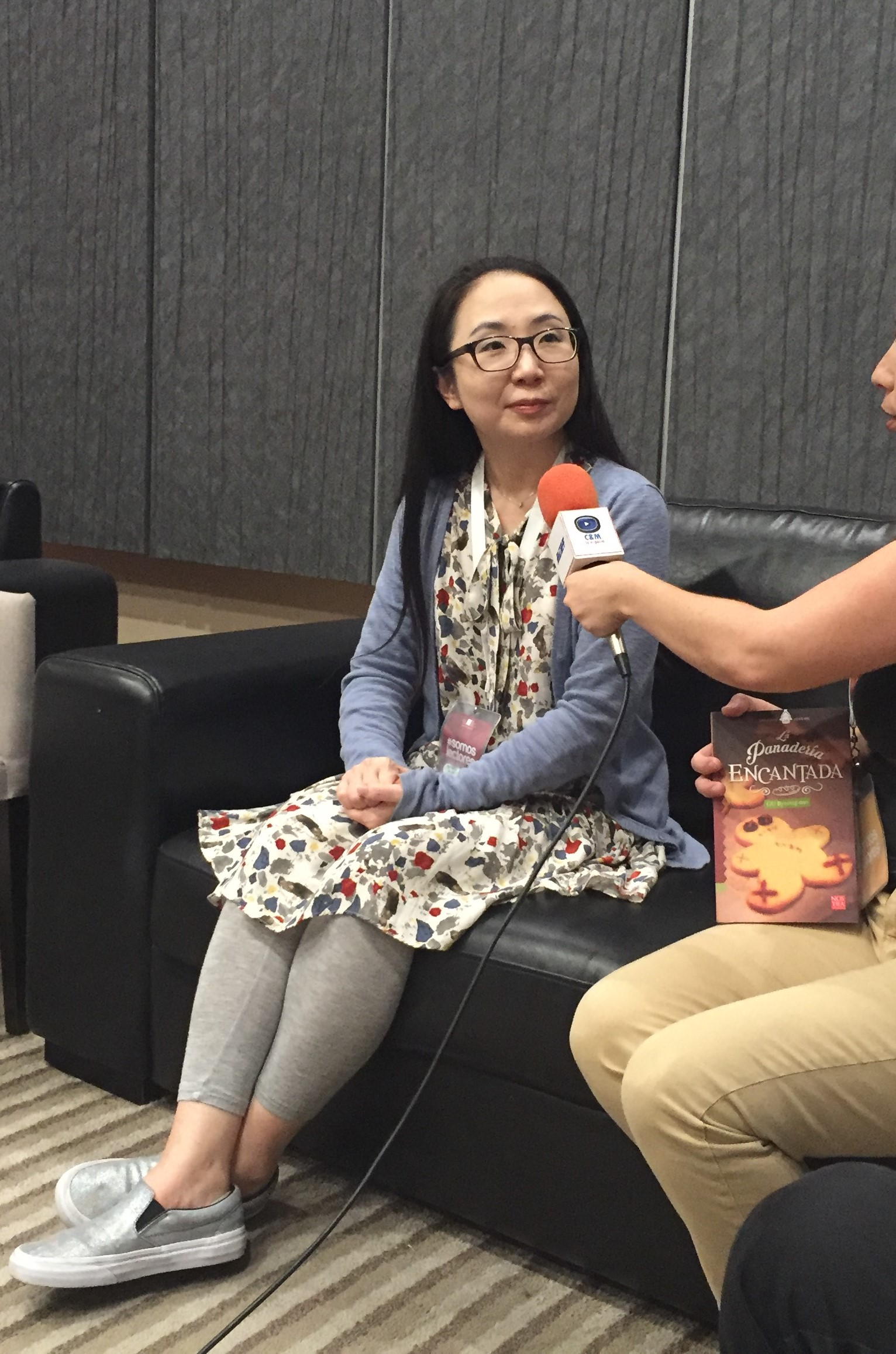
- Gu Byeong-mo at the Guadalajara International Book Fair
- Born: Jeong Yu-gyeong; 1976 (age 49–50)
- Occupation: Writer
- Writing career
- Genre: Fiction

Korean name
- Hangul: 정유경
- RR: Jeong Yugyeong
- MR: Chŏng Yugyŏng

Pen name
- Hangul: 구병모
- RR: Gu Byeongmo
- MR: Ku Pyŏngmo

Gu Byeong-mo (Korean: 구병모; born 1976) is a South Korean writer. She made her literary debut in 2009 when her novel Wizard Bakery (위저드 베이커리 Wizard Bakery) won the 2nd Changbi Prize for Young Adult Fiction. Her 2015 short story collection Geugeosi namaneun anigireul (그것이 나만은 아니기를 I Hope It's Not Just Me) received the Today's Writer Award and Hwang Sun-won New Writers' Award. She penned the novels Pigeumallion aideul (피그말리온 아이들 The Pygmalion Children), Agami (아가미 Gills), and Bangjuro oseyo (방주로 오세요 Come to Bangju) as well as the short story collection Gouineun anijiman (고의는 아니지만 I Didn't Mean to But). Gu's debut novel Wijeodeu Beikeori was translated into Spanish by Minjeong Jeong and Irma Zyanja Gil Yáñez. They received the 24th Daesan Literary Award in 2016 for their translation.

== Life ==
Gu Byeong-mo was born in Seoul, South Korea in 1976. Gu studied Korean literature at Kyung Hee University.

== Writing ==
Many of Gu Byeong-mo's works are genre fiction. Her debut novel Wijeodeu beikeori (위저드 베이커리 Wizard Bakery) mixes mystery, horror, and fantasy. It is the first young adult novel in South Korea to employ magic as a major plot device, breaking the convention of the genre to deal with only realistic settings. The judges of the Changbi Prize for Young Adult Fiction chose Wijeodeu as the winner because it is a fantastical allegory that deviates from the standard coming-of-age story set in schools.

Gu's later works are also allegories that use unusual motifs to reveal a dark side of reality. “Hwagapsonyeojeon” (화갑소녀전 Tale of the Match Girl) is a short story based on “The Little Match Girl” by Hans Christian Andersen. But instead of seeing wonderful visions in the glow of her matches, the protagonist only sees scenes of horror and tragedy. The story urges readers to question commonly accepted truths or lessons and to view the world in a new light.

== Works ==
- Apartment Women (2024)
- 엄마의 완성 (2024)
- 《단지 소설일 뿐이네》 (문학실험실) 2024.01 ISBN 9791198481719
- 《있을 법한 모든 것》 (문학동네) 2023.07 ISBN 9788954694179
- 《파쇄 (소설 파과의 외전)》 (위즈덤하우스) 2023.03 ISBN 9791168127012
- 《로렘 입숨의 책》 (안온북스) 2023.12 ISBN 9791192638072
- 《상아의 문으로》 (문학과지성사) 2021.11 ISBN 9788932039251
- 《바늘과 가죽의 시》 (현대문학) 2021.05 ISBN 9791190885713
- 『두 번째 엔딩』 중 「초원조의 아이에게」 (2021)
- 《심장에 수놓은 이야기 (A Story Embroided In The Heart)》 (아르테) 2020.03 ISBN 9788950986735
- 《버드 스트라이크 (Bird Strike)》 (창비) 2019.03 ISBN 9788936456887
- 《단 하나의 문장 (The One Sentence)》 (문학동네) 2018.11 ISBN 978-89546534-8-0
- 《네 이웃의 식탁 (Four Neighbors' Dining Table)》 (민음사) 2018.06 ISBN 978-89374731-9-7
- 《어느 피씨주의자의 종생기 (The Story of P.C.)》 (아시아) 2017.10 ISBN 979-11566233-2-8
- 《한 스푼의 시간 (A Spoonful of Time)》 (위즈덤하우스) 2016.09 ISBN 978-89591305-8-0
- 《빨간구두당 (The Red Shoes Party)》 (창비) 2015.09 ISBN 978-89364373-4-3
- 《파과 (Damaged Fruit)》 (자음과모음) 2013.08 ISBN 978-89570777-4-0
- 《피그말리온 아이들 (The Pygmalion Children)》 (창비) 2012.06 ISBN 978-89364564-5-0
- 《방주로 오세요 (Come to Bangju)》 (문학과지성사) 2012.01 ISBN 978-89320227-0-3
- 《고의는 아니지만 (I Didn’t Mean to But )》 (자음과모음) 2011.08 ISBN 978-89570757-8-4
- 《아가미 (Gills)》 (자음과모음) 2011.03 ISBN 978-89570754-2-5
- 《위저드 베이커리 (Wizard Bakery)》 (창비) 2009.03 ISBN 978-60008346-9-2

=== co-authorship ===
- 《땀 흘리는 소설》 (창비교육) 2019.03 ISBN 979-11892283-6-1
- 《무민은 채식주의자》 (걷는사람) 2018.11 ISBN 979-11891281-9-7
- 《불안의 주파수 (청소년 테마 소설)》 (문학동네) 2018.09 ISBN 978-89546528-8-9
- 《파란 아이 (Blue Child)》 (창비) 2018.09 ISBN 978-89364565-0-4
- 《근방에 히어로가 너무 많사오니 (인기 작가 8인의 슈퍼히어로 단편 앤솔러지)》 (민음인) 2018.09 ISBN 979-11588843-1-4
- 《소설 제주》 (아르띠잔) 2018.07 ISBN 979-11963738-0-1
- 《꿈을 꾸었다고 말했다 (2018년 제42회 이상문학상 작품집)》 (문학사상) 2018.01 ISBN 978-89701297-9-2
- 《현남 오빠에게 (페미니즘 소설)》 (다산책방) 2017.11 ISBN 979-11306147-7-9
- 《제7회 문지문학상 수상작품집 (행복의 과학)》 (문학과지성사) 2017.06 ISBN 978-89320301-0-4
- 《소년, 소녀를 만나다 (황순원의 소나기 이어쓰기)》 (문학과지성사) 2016.05 ISBN 978-89320287-0-5
- 《그것이 나만은 아니기를 (2015 오늘의 작가상 수상작)》 May It Not Be Just Me (문학과지성사) 2015.03 ISBN 978-89320271-7-3
- 《겨울의 눈빛 (제4회 문지문학상 수상작품집, 2014)》 (문학과지성사) 2014.05 ISBN 978-89320262-1-3
- 《한.중 걸작단편선》 (자음과모음) 2014.04 ISBN 978-89570780-0-6
- 《쓰다 참, 사랑 (9인 9색 작가들의 선문답 같은 연애 상상)》 (난다) 2013.07 ISBN 978-89546215-4-0
- 《행복한 문학편지 (48인의 작가가 독자에게 들려주는 못다 한 이야기)》 (삶이보이는창) 2013.06 ISBN 978-89665502-6-5
- 《작가가 선정한 오늘의 소설 (2011)》 (작가) 2011.03 ISBN 978-8994815046
- 《오늘의 장르 문학》 (황금가지) 2010.11 ISBN 978-89942106-4-3

=== Works in Translation (partial) ===
- The Old Woman with the Knife (English)
- La panadería encantada (Spanish)
- Fils de l'eau (French)
- AZALEA (Journal of Korean Literature & Culture) : Volume Ten (English)

== Adaptation ==
In 2025, her novel The Old Woman with the Knife was adapted into a feature film The Old Woman with the Knife (파과) directed by Min Kyu-dong. The film will premiere at the 75th Berlin International Film Festival in February 2025 as part of Berlinale Special programme.

== Awards ==
- 2016: Daesan Literary Award, translation category
- 2015: Today's Writer Award
- 2015: Hwang Sun-won New Writers' Award
- 2009: Changbi Prize for Young Adult Fiction
- 2022: Kim You jeong Academic Award
