= Shin Kyung-sook =

South Korean writer (born 1963)

Kyung-sook Shin
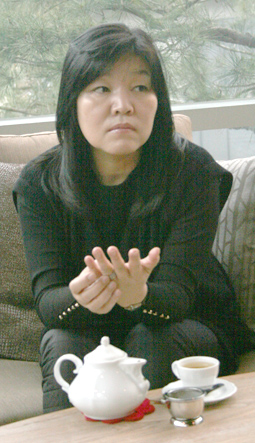
- Kyung-Sook Shin
- Born: 12 January 1963 (age 63); Jeongeup, North Jeolla Province, South Korea
- Occupations: Novelist, Writer
- Writing career
- Period: 1985 –
- Notable work: Please Look After Mother (2009)
- Notable awards: Yi Sang Literary Award

Korean name
- Hangul: 신경숙
- Hanja: 申京淑
- RR: Sin Gyeongsuk
- MR: Sin Kyŏngsuk

Kyung-sook Shin, also Shin Kyung-sook or Shin Kyoung-sook (Korean: 신경숙, born 12 January 1963), is a South Korean writer. She was the only South Korean and only woman to win the Man Asian Literary Prize in 2012 for Please Look After Mom.

== Life ==
Kyung-sook Shin was born in 1963 in a village near Jeongeup, North Jeolla Province in southern South Korea. She was the fourth child and oldest daughter of six. At sixteen she moved to Seoul, where her older brother lived. She worked in an electronics plant while attending night school. She made her literary debut in 1985 with the novella Winter’s Fable after graduating from the Seoul Institute of the Arts as a creative writing major. Along with Kim Insuk and Gong Ji-young, Kyung-sook Shin is one of the group of female writers known as the 386 Generation.

== Career ==
Kyung-sook Shin won the Munye Joongang New Author Prize for her novella Winter Fables. She has won a wide variety of literary prizes, including the Today’s Young Artist Award from the South Korean Ministry of Culture, Sports and Tourism; Hankook Ilbo Literature Prize; Hyundae Literature Award; Manhae Literature Prize; Dong-in Literary Award; Yi Sang Literary Award; and the Oh Yeongsu Literature Prize. In 2009 the French translation of her work A Lone Room, La Chambre solitaire, was one of the winners of the Prix de l'inaperçu, which recognizes excellent literary works which have not yet reached a wide audience. The international rights to the million-copy bestseller Please Look After Mother was sold in 19 countries, including the United States and various countries in Europe and Asia, beginning with China. The book was translated into English by Chi-young Kim, and released on March 31, 2011. Kyung-sook Shin won the 2011 Man Asian Literary Prize for Please Look After Mom, the first woman to do so.

== Controversy ==
On June 16, 2015, The Huffington Post Korea reported that Kyung-sook Shin had plagiarized Yukio Mishima's passage from the short story Patriotism in her book Legend. Shin apologised; her publisher withdrew a collection of her short stories.

== Works ==
Novels

- Winter Fable (겨울 우화, 1990)
- Deep Sorrow (깊은 슬픔, 1994)
- A Lone Room (외딴방, 1995)
  - translated as The Girl Who Wrote Loneliness by Ha-Yun Jung (Pegasus Books, 2015)
- Long Ago, When I Left My Home (오래전 집을 떠날때, 1996)
- The Train Departs at 7 (기차는 7시에 떠나네, 1999)
- Violet (바이올렛, 2001)
  - translated as Violets by Anton Hur (Feminist Press, 2022)
- J's Story (J 이야기, 2002)
- Yi Jin (리진, 2007)
  - translated as The Court Dancer by Anton Hur (Pegasus Books, 2018)
- Please Look After Mom (엄마를 부탁해, 2009)
  - translated as Please Look After Mom by Chi-Young Kim (Alfred A. Knopf, 2011)
- I'll Be Right There (어디선가 나를 찾는 전화벨이 울리고, 2010)
  - translated as I'll Be Right There by Sora Kim-Russell (Other Press, 2014)
- The Unknown Women (모르는 여인들, 2011)
- Stories I Wish To Tell the Moon (달에게 들려주고싶은 이야기, 2013)
- I Went To See My Father (아버지에게 갔었어, 2021)
  - translated as I Went To See My Father by Anton Hur (Astra House and Weidenfeld & Nicolson, 2023)

Short stories

- "Where the Harmonium Once Stood" (풍금이 있던 자리, 1993)
  - translated as The Place Where the Harmonium Was by Agnita Tennant in the Modern Korean Literature Series (ASIA Publishers, 2012)
- "Potato Eaters" (감자 먹는 사람들, 1997)
- "Until It Turns into a River" (강물이 될때까지, 1998)
- "Strawberry Fields" (딸기밭, 2000)
- "The Sound of Bells" (종소리, 2003)

Non-fiction

- Beautiful Shade (아름다운 그늘, 1995)
- Sleep, Sorrow (자거라, 네 슬픔아, 2003)

== Awards ==
- Contemporary Literature (Hyundae Munhak) Award (1995)
- Manhae Award for Literature (1996)
- Dong-in Literary Award (1997)
- 21st Century Literature Award (2000)
- Yi Sang Literary Award (2001)
- Oh Young-su Literary Award (2006)
- Prix de l'inaperçu (2009)
- Republic of Korea Culture and Arts Award (2011)
- Man Asian Literary Prize (2012)
- Mark of Respect Award (2012)
- Seoul Foreign Correspondents Club Foreign Public Relations Award – Literary Section (2012)
- Ho-Am Prize – Literature Award (2013)

== See also ==
- Korean Literature
- List of Korean novelists
- List of Korean female writers
