= Kim Young-ha =

South Korean writer (born 1968)

Young-ha Kim
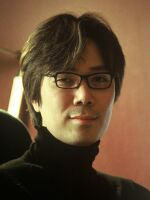
- Born: November 11, 1968 (age 57); Hwacheon, South Korea
- Education: Yonsei University
- Occupation: Novelist
- Writing career
- Genre: Fiction
- Notable work: I Have the Right to Destroy Myself
- Notable awards: Yi Sang Literary Award, Dong-in Literary Award

Korean name
- Hangul: 김영하
- Hanja: 金英夏
- RR: Gim Yeongha
- MR: Kim Yŏngha

Young-ha Kim (born November 11, 1968) is a South Korean novelist and short story writer. He is one of the most prominent figures in contemporary Korean literature, known for exploring themes of urban alienation, identity, and modern capitalism. His debut novel, I Have the Right to Destroy Myself (1996), established his reputation and has been translated into more than ten languages including English, French, German, and Chinese. His historical novel Black Flower (2003) won the Dong-in Literary Award in 2004, and Your Republic Is Calling You (2006) won the Manhae Literary Award in 2007. Several of his works have been adapted into films and a musical. He was a visiting scholar at Columbia University from 2010 to 2011.

== Life ==
Kim was born in Hwacheon on November 11, 1968. He moved from place to place as a child, since his father was in the military. As a child, he suffered from gas poisoning from coal gas and lost memory before ten. He was educated at Yonsei University in Seoul, earning undergraduate as well as graduate degrees in Business Administration from Yonsei University, but he didn't show much interest in it. Instead he focused on writing stories. Kim, after graduating from Yonsei University in 1993, began his military service as an assistant detective at the military police 51st Infantry Division near Suwon. His career as a professional writer started in 1995 right after discharge when his short-story A Meditation On Mirror (Geoure daehan myeongsang) appeared in Review, and the following year, won the 1st New Writer's Award given by Munhak Dongne with the novel, I Have a Right to Destroy Myself (Naneun nareul pagoehal gwolliga itda).

Kim previously worked as a professor in the Drama School at Korean National University of Arts and on a regular basis hosted a book-themed radio program. In autumn 2008, he resigned all his jobs to devote himself exclusively to writing. Kim also translates English novels, most recently a Korean adaptation of F. Scott Fitzgerald's The Great Gatsby. He was a visiting scholar at Columbia University from September 2010 to June 2011.

== Work ==
His first novel, published in Korean in 1996, was I Have the Right to Destroy Myself. It has been translated into English, French, German, Czech, Dutch, Polish, Turkish, Chinese, Vietnamese, Mongolian and Croatian. His historical novel Black Flower, which won the Dong-in Literary Award in 2004, tells the story of Korean migrant workers in Mexico later involved in a Pancho Villa-led military uprising. Sources of inspiration for this novel came from classical Bildungsroman, stories of sea trips as illustrated by the popular film Titanic, ethnography of religion, as well as Korean histories of exile and immigration. Another instance of Kim's mixed style is found in Your Republic Is Calling You, his fourth novel, in which he raises the question of human identity in a democratic and consumerist Korean society by presenting a North Korean spy and his family in Seoul in the manner of a crime fiction combined with a truncated family saga and naturalist depiction of everyday life. It has been translated into seven languages including English (US title: Your Republic Is Calling You).

Kim Young-ha is often judged as a writer skilled in rendering 1990's urban sensibilities. Featuring a professional suicide assistant as a protagonist, I Have a Right to Destroy Myself pioneers a new realm in the genre of fantasy literature; stories contained in Summoning and What Happened to the Man Caught in the Elevator Door? tackle computer games, plastic art, cult movies, hostage situations, homosexuality, and other subject matters not commonly explored in Korean literature, which are becoming a part of modern reality. Kim's stories utilize unfamiliar or even strange settings to explore the by-product of modern capitalism and urban culture, such as alienation and inability to communicate, extreme narcissism and its limitations. His second novel, Why Did Arang, centers on the legend of Arang. Murdered by her nanny, Arang becomes a ghost haunting all Miryang deputies in an attempt to expose her killer. The terrified deputies, however, die of fear as soon as they see the ghost, and Arang remains a woeful spirit until a deputy brave enough to stand the sight of her is assigned to Miryang region and finally avenges her. The ancient legend of Arang unfolds simultaneously with the story of two present day characters, hairdresser Yeongju and writer Park; and the narrator takes up the dual role of a storyteller recounting the legend of Arang as well as a detective providing hints and evidence necessary for solving the mysteries presented in the novel. Employing the devices of a detective novel, and at the same time parodying an ancient legend, Why Did Arang reveals that the author's interest in the art of fiction extends beyond mere plot or characterization to the function of narrator and the very definition of storytelling.

Two films have already been based on his fiction: My Right to Ravage Myself (2003) and The Scarlet Letter, and the cinematic adaptation of Your Republic Is Calling You is currently in progress. in 2014, his novel, Brother Has Returned was used as the basis of the movie Total Messed Family. His novel, The Quiz Show, was also made into a musical. In addition, Kim's work is popular with fans online who have made videos and animations of his work. In 2017, A Murderer's Guide to Memorization was also adapted into the film Memoir of a Murderer.

Kim, along with John H. Lee, won Best Adapted Screenplay at the 2005 Grand Bell Awards for the script of A Moment to Remember.

== Personal life ==
He married Jang Eun-soo while he was working for Yonsei University language school in 1996.

Kim revealed he was an antinatalist in a 2008 interview. Kim views life as so full of suffering he has decided to refrain from giving birth to any children.

== Works (partial) ==
=== Novels ===
- I Have the Right to Destroy Myself (Na-neun na-reul pagoehal gwolli-ga issda 1996)
- Why, Arang (Arang-eun wae 2001)
- Black Flower (Geomeun kkot 2003)
- Your Republic Is Calling You (Bit-e jeguk 2006)
- Quiz Show (Kwijeusyo 2007)
- I Hear Your Voice (Neo-ui moksori-ga deullyeo 2012)
- A Murderer's Guide to Memorization (Salinja-ui gieokbeop 2013)

=== Short stories ===
- The Pager (Hochul 1997)
- The Vampire (Heup-hyul-gwi 1998)
- Whatever Happened to the Guy Stuck in the Elevator? (Ellibeiteo-e kkin geu namja-neun eotteoke doe-eossna 1999)
- Brother has Returned (Oppa-ga dolawassda 2004)
- Nobody {Blank} What Happened (2010)
- Only Two Person (2017)

=== Essays ===
- 《Gulbi Fishing》 (Gulbi-nakksi, 2000)
- 《Kim Young-Ha, Lee Woo-il's Movie Story》 (Kim-yeongha iu-il-ui yeonghwa iyagi, 2003)
- 《Daily Life》 (Il-sang, 2001)
- 《Post-it》 (2002)

== Works in Translation ==
=== English ===
- Your Republic Is Calling You (2006), winner in 2007 of the Manhae Literary Award
- Black Flower (2003), winner in 2004 of the Dong-in Literary Award
- Brother has Returned, (collection of short stories) winner in 2004 of the Yi Sang Literary Award.
- Photo Shop Murder (English translation 2003)
- I Have the Right to Destroy Myself (1996; English translation, 2007)
- Diary of a murderer and other stories, translated by Krys Lee (collection of stories, 2019) contains 4 stories:
  - Diary of a murderer (novella, translation of 살인자의 기억법; Sarinja ŭi kiŏkpŏp)
  - The origin of life (short story, translation of 인생의 원점; Insaeng ŭi wŏnchŏm)
  - Missing child (short story, translation of 아이를 찾습니다; Ai rŭl ch'atsŭmnida)
  - The writer (short story, translation of 옥수수와 나; Oksusu wa na)

=== Other languages ===
I Have the Right to Destroy Myself (나는 나를 파괴할 권리가 있다)

- Tengo Derecho a destruirme (Spanish)
- Kendimi yıkmaya hakkım var (Turkish)
- Ik heb het recht mezelf te vernietigen (Dutch)
- Mám právo se zničit (Czech)
- Həyatımı məhv etməyə haqqım var (Azerbaijanian)
- Pravo na samouništenje (Croatian)
- Tôi có quyền hủy hoại bản thân (Vietnamese)

Whatever Happened to the Guy Stuck in the Elevator? (엘리베이터에 낀 그 남자는 어떻게 되었나?)

- Kas gi nutiko lifte įstrigusiam vyriškiui (Lithuanian)
- Hur gick det for mannen som satt fast i hissen? (Swedish)
- Wampir i inne opowiadania (Polish)

Your Republic Is Calling You (빛의 제국)

- L'empire des lumieres (French)
- L'IMPERO DELLE LUCI (Italian)
- 光之帝国 (Chinese)
- Říše světla (Czech)
- Schwarze Blume [검은 꽃] (German)

Diary of a Murderer: And Other Stories (살인자의 기억법)

- Bir katilin Güncesi (Turkish)

Quiz Show (퀴즈쇼)

- Chơi Quiz Show (Vietnamese)
- Quiz Show (French)

== Awards ==
- Munhakdongne New Writer Award (1996) I Have the Right to Destroy Myself
- Hyundae Literature Award (1999)
- Lee San Literary Award (2004) The Brother is Back
- Hwang Sun-won Literary Award (2004) Treasure Ship
- Dong-in Literature Award (2004) Black Flower
- Manhae Literary Award (2007) Your Republic is Calling You
- Yi Sang Literary Award (2012) for "The Corn and I"
- A Awards - Intelligent section (2013)

== See also ==
- Korean literature
- List of Korean novelists
