= List of Law of the Jungle episodes =

This is a list of episodes of the South Korean reality-documentary show Law of the Jungle. The show airs on SBS every Friday at 22:00 (KST) starting from October 21, 2011 till May 29, 2021.

== List of episodes ==
=== Namibia ===
Episode #	Title	Location	Air date
1–6	Kim Byungi-man's Law of the Jungle	Namibia, Africa	October 21, 2011 – December 2, 2011
Theme: Survival and Coexistence; Members: Kim Byung-man, Ryu Dam, Ricky Kim, Hwang Kwang-hee (ZE:A)

=== Papua ===
Episode #	Title	Location	Air date
7–11	Kim Byung-man's Law of the Jungle	Papua, Indonesia, Southeast Asia	December 9, 2011 – January 13, 2012
Theme: Jungle Road; Members: Kim Byung-man, Kim Kwang-kyu, Noh Woo-jin, Ricky Kim, Hwang Kwang-hee (ZE:A), Taemi; Notes: Kim Kwang-kyu suffered a decline in health during the trip and returned to South Korea early. Hwang Kwang-hee replaced him midway.

=== Vanuatu ===
Episode #	Title	Location	Air date
13–22	Good Sunday – Kim Byung-man's Law of the Jungle in Vanuatu	Vanuatu, Oceania	May 6, 2012 – July 8, 2012
Theme: Tribal Evolution; Members: Kim Byung-man, Choo Sung-hoon, Park Si-eun, Noh Woo-jin, Ricky Kim, Hwang Kwang-hee (ZE:A)

=== Siberia ===
Episode #	Title	Location	Air date
23–28	Good Sunday – Kim Byung-man's Law of the Jungle in Siberia	Siberia, Russia, North Asia	July 15, 2012 – August 26, 2012
Theme: Road to the End of the Earth; Members: Kim Byung-man, Lee Tae-gon, Noh Woo-jin, Ricky Kim, Hwang Kwang-hee (ZE:A); Notes: Hwang Kwanghee suffered an injury during the trip and returned to South Korea early.

=== Madagascar ===
Episode #	Title	Location	Air date
29–40	Good Sunday – Kim Byung-man's Law of the Jungle in Madagascar	Madagascar, Africa	September 2, 2012 – November 16, 2012
Theme: Exploring Lost Treasure; Members: Kim Byung-man, Park Jung-chul, Ryu Dam, Noh Woo-jin, Ricky Kim, Jeon Hye-bin, Jeong Jin-woon (2AM); Notes: The last episode aired on Friday as a separate program, moving out of Good Sunday due to the return of K-pop Star Season 2.

=== Amazon/Galapagos ===
Episode #	Title	Location	Air date
41–50	Law of the Jungle in Amazon/Galapagos	Amazon rainforest & Galápagos Islands, Ecuador, South America	December 28, 2012 – March 1, 2013
Members: Kim Byung-man, Choo Sung-hoon, Park Jung-chul, Park Sol-mi, Noh Woo-jin, Mir (MBLAQ); Notes: The cast arrived in Ecuador without Kim Byung-man and crossed the Andes to find the zero degree position and determine the equator. Kim Byung-man and Mir joined the tribe before they headed to the Amazon. They first stayed in, and escaped from an uninhabited island before moving to the deeper parts of the Amazon to find the last warrior tribe, the Huaorani. Kim Byung-man suffered an allergic reaction to a bullet ant bite during the trip, which required him to seek immediate medical care. When they arrived in the village, they were asked to pass a series of tests, which includes hunting and climbing a tree. They then flew to the San Cristobal Island, Galapagos Islands where the environmental laws prohibits fishing and starting a fire, which caused problems for the team who must stay there for 48 hours.

=== New Zealand ===
Episode #	Title	Location	Air date
51–60	Law of the Jungle in New Zealand	Chatham Islands/South Island, New Zealand, Oceania	March 8, 2013 – May 10, 2013
Theme: Return to First Intentions; Members: Kim Byung-man, Lee Pil-mo, Park Jung-chul, Noh Woo-jin, Ricky Kim, Jung Suk-won, Park Bo-young; Notes: A large controversy was sparked regarding the reality aspect of the program, following a post by the CEO of Park Bo-young's agency on Facebook claiming the entire program is fake.

=== Himalayas ===
Episode #	Title	Location	Air date
61–70	Law of the Jungle in Himalayas	Himalayas, Nepal, South Asia	May 17, 2013 – July 19, 2013
Members: Kim Byung-man, Ahn Jung-hwan, Park Jung-chul, Noh Woo-jin, Jung Joon, Oh Ji-eun, Kim Hye-seong

=== Caribbean/Maya Jungle ===
Episode #	Title	Location	Air date
71–80	Law of the Jungle in Caribbean/Maya Jungle	Caribbean & Belize, Central America	July 26, 2013 – September 27, 2013
Theme: Perseverance; Members: Kim Byung-man, Kim Sung-soo, Ryu Dam, Noh Woo-jin, Cho Yeo-jeong, Oh Jong-hyuk (Click-B), Sungyeol (Infinite)

=== Savanna ===
Episode #	Title	Location	Air date
81–89	Law of the Jungle in Savanna	Tanzania/Kenya, East Africa	October 4, 2013 – December 13, 2013
Theme: Self-Reliance; Members: Kim Byung-man, Kim Won-jun, Ryu Dam, Noh Woo-jin, Han Eun-jung, Lee Kyu-han, Jung Tae-woo

=== Micronesia ===
Episode #	Title	Location	Air date
90–99	Law of the Jungle in Micronesia	Micronesia, Oceania	December 20, 2013 – February 21, 2014
Members: Kim Byung-man, Im Won-hee, Ye Ji-won, Park Jung-chul, Ryu Dam, Oh Jong-hyuk (Click-B); Ep. 90–94 (Relay Survival): Chanyeol (EXO); Ep. 95–99 (Relay Survival): Yim Si-wan (ZE:A); Notes: The cast are challenged to find the 92 secrets of the ruins of Nan Madol. It was eventually revealed that the site is composed of 92 artificial islands. For the first half, each member had a 'guardian angel' among the other members who secretly chose them to take care of and protect. Despite this, Oh Jong-hyuk cut himself while climbing a coconut tree and had to get stitches. In the second half, the cast traveled to Kosrae and are given their second mission: Find out the secret behind 16:17 or 4:17 PM. Their final location is the Chuuk islands where they are given their last mission, which is to live without the chief, Kim Byung-man, for 50 hours.

=== Borneo ===
Episode #	Title	Location	Air date
100–107	Law of the Jungle in Borneo: the Hunger Games	Dinawan Island, Sabah Malaysia, Borneo, Southeast Asia	February 28, 2014 – May 2, 2014
Theme: Homo Ludens; Members: Kim Byung-man, Im Won-hee, Bong Tae-gyu, Lee Young-ah, Seo Ha-joon, Kim Dong-jun (ZE:A); Ep. 100–102 (100th Episode Special): Choo Sung-hoon, Oh Jong-hyuk (Click-B), Jeon Hye-bin, Hwang Kwang-hee (ZE:A); Ep. 103–105 (Relay Survival): Hwang Hyun-hee; Ep. 105–107 (Relay Survival): Onew (Shinee); Notes: For the celebration of its 100th episode, the show brought back some of its most experienced and strongest veterans to form a team that will compete against Kim Byung-man's new tribe in a Hunger Games special. The locations they visited and were a cast of would act as districts, in which case, Jeon Hye-bin would be from District Madagascar, Choo Sung-hoon from Districts Vanuatu and Amazon, Oh Jong-hyuk from Districts Caribbean and Micronesia, and Hwang Kwang-hee from Districts Namibia, Papua, Vanuatu and Siberia. To prepare for the games, the new cast went to a 'Survival Camp' and spent time with the Murut tribe to learn basic survival skills in the jungle such as making fire the traditional way. After the competition, the new cast were brought to a traditional Bajau house in the middle of the sea, which would become their camp.

=== Brazil ===
Episode #	Title	Location	Air date
108–116	Law of the Jungle in Brazil	Brazil, South America	May 9, 2014 – July 4, 2014
Theme: Blind Quest; Members: Kim Byung-man, Ye Ji-won, Bae Sung-jae, Bong Tae-gyu, Oh Jong-hyuk (Click-B); Ep. 108–112 (Relay Survival): Lee Min-woo (Shinhwa), Onew (Shinee); Ep. 112–116 (Relay Survival): Kangin (Super Junior), Hyuk (VIXX)

=== Indian Ocean ===
Episode #	Title	Location	Air date
117–125	Law of the Jungle in Indian Ocean	Indian Ocean, Reunion Island	July 11, 2014 – September 5, 2014
Theme: Journey of Self-discovery; Members: Kim Byung-man, Kim Seung-soo, Park Hwi-soon, Kang Ji-sub, Uee (After School), James (Royal Pirates), Niel (Teen Top); Notes: With a cast composed of celebrities who live mundane lives outside of work, they go on a trip to 'find themselves' which has 3 phases. 1. Who are you? 2. Who am I? and 3. Who are we? On the second day in Reunion island, almost all the members required medical care due to increased stomach acidity because of eating lemons on an empty stomach and filming had to be stopped. The next morning, while trying to film by the sea, the cast members were hit by a large wave, causing Uee to fall and hit her head on the rocky shore. She was immediately taken to the staff's camp to get stitches. Despite this, she continued the trip and still participated in the cast's next task, where the 7 members must survive by themselves in separate areas on the island for 24 hours. No member can bring their own bags and all were packed by the other members who gave items they brought with them to the other members. Afterwards, they are reunited and move to another location before being transported days later to Formica Leo to find the hint for their next survival location, which is revealed to be Mauritius.

=== Solomon Islands ===
Episode #	Title	Location	Air date
126–136	Law of the Jungle in Solomon Islands	Solomon Islands, Oceania	September 12, 2014 – November 21, 2014
Theme: Solomon's Choice; Members: Kim Byung-man, Jung Doo-hong, Park Jung-chul, Kim Gyu-ri, Ryu Dam; Ep. 126–130 (Relay Survival): Kwon Oh-joong, Kim Tae-woo, Kikwang (Beast); Ep. 131–136 (Relay Survival): Lee Jae-yoon, Dana (The Grace), Tao (EXO); Ep. 134–136: Yoon Do-hyun (Special Guest); Notes: The 15th tribe begin their trip by heading to Savo Island to meet the Melanesian people residing there to learn some tips about the island such as the fruits growing there. During their stay, they were taught how to look for Megapodes' eggs. Inspired by the story of King Solomon and the two mothers, the staff explains the trip's theme, which is 'Solomon's Choice'. Throughout the trip they must make wise decisions and this was first tested when the staff asked each member to pick which boat they will take to Anuha Island. Once a day, the cast will be asked to make a 'life or death choice', such as only taking one member's bags to survive with when the staff confiscated their luggage or choosing to live without fire or water for 24 hours. Due to other schedule commitments, Tao was only able to stay for a few days (Ep. 131–133)

=== Costa Rica ===
Episode #	Title	Location	Air date
137–145	Law of the Jungle in Costa Rica	Costa Rica	November 28, 2014 – January 23, 2015
Theme: Eco Survival; Members: Kim Byung-man, Park Jung-chul, Ryu Dam, Seo Ji-seok, Lee Tae-im; Ep. 137–142: Im Chang-jung, Lee Chang-min (2AM); Ep. 142–145: Jung Man-sik, Dongwoo (Infinite)

=== Palau ===
Episode #	Title	Location	Air date
146–153	Law of the Jungle with Friends	Palau	January 30, 2015 – March 20, 2015
Members: Kim Byung-man, Ryu Dam & Yoon Se-ah, Son Ho-jun & Baro (B1A4); Ep. 146–150: Yook Joong-wan (Rose Motel) & Sam Okyere; Ep. 150–152: Jo Dong-hyuk & Sam Hammington; Ep. 152–153: Yook Joong-wan

=== Indochina ===
Episode #	Title	Location	Air date
154–162	Law of the Jungle in Indochina	Indochina peninsula	March 27, 2015 – May 22, 2015
Theme: Law of the Jungle Family Outing!; Members: Kim Byung-man, Lee Sung-jae, Raymon Kim, Ryu Dam, Jang Su-won, Lim Ji-yeon; Ep. 154–158: Seo In-guk, Son Ho-jun; Ep. 158–162: Kim Jong-min, Park Hyung-sik (ZE:A)

=== Yap ===
Episode #	Title	Location	Air date
163–170	Law of the Jungle in Yap	Yap Islands	May 29, 2015 – July 17, 2015
Theme: War of Stones; Members: Kim Byung-man, Lee Jung-jin, Ryu Dam, Park Han-byul; Ep. 163–165 (Relay Survival): Ryu Seung-soo, Kangnam (M.I.B), Lee Yi-kyung; Ep. 166–170 (Relay Survival): Yoon Sang-hyun, Bae Soo-bin, Eun Ji-won; Ep. 169–170: Jeong Jin-woon, Dasom (Sistar); Notes: Park Han-byul finished the trip and left the show on episode 168, and was replaced by Jeong Jinwoon and Dasom. But all the flights from Yap Airport were cancelled at that filming days due to the bad weather caused by Typhoon Noul in Yap Island, she had to stay for few more days while Jeong Jinwoon and Dasom's flight from Guam Airport was also cancelled and they appeared since the end of episode 169.

=== Brunei ===
Episode #	Title	Location	Air date
171–177	Law of the Jungle: Hidden Kingdom Special	Brunei	July 24, 2015 – September 4, 2015
Theme: Hidden Kingdom (1st Half), The Last Hunter (2nd Half); Members: Kim Byung-man, Sam Hammington; Ep. 171–174: Jeong Jun-ha, Shim Hyung-tak, Nam Gyu-ri, Do Sang-woo, Jun Hyo-seong (Secret), Jeong Jin-woon; Ep. 175–177: Lee Tae-gon, Mino (Freestyle), Haha, Ryu Dam, Seo Hyo-rim, Chanyeol (EXO); Notes: Trip was shot on Ramadhan. Before the tribe started their survival, they took one day vacation to see some of Brunei's landmark, such as Istana Nurul Iman, Omar Ali Saifuddien Mosque, and habitat of Proboscis Monkeys. Jun Hyo-seong joined tribe on late episode 172. Chanyeol released an OST for the show titled "Last Hunter".

=== Nicaragua ===
Episode #	Title	Location	Air date
178–185	Law of the Jungle in Nicaragua	Nicaragua & Caribbean	September 11, 2015 – October 30, 2015
Theme: Triathlon Survival (1st Half), Find Big 3 (2nd Half), Send Me (4th Anniversary Special, recording in the Caribbean); Members: Kim Byung-man, Hyun Joo-yup, Kim Dong-hyun, Choi Woo-shik; Ep. 178–180: Jo Han-sun, Hani (EXID), Jackson (Got7); Ep. 181–184: Ryu Dam, Kim Tae-woo, N (VIXX), Minah (Girl's Day); Ep. 184–185 (4th Anniversary Special): Kim Byung-man, Ryu Dam, Kim Ki-bang, Go Joo-won, Lee Mi-do, Yoo Seung-ok, Kim Hee-jung

=== Samoa ===
Episode #	Title	Location	Air date
186–194	Law of the Jungle in Samoa	Samoa	November 6, 2015 – January 1, 2016
Theme: Find the Treasures; Members: Kim Byung-man, Lee Sang-yeob; Ep. 186–190: Lee Won-jong, Kang Kyun-sung (Noel), Wang Ji-hye, Beast (Yoon Doo-joon, Yong Jun-hyung); Ep. 186–189: Jung Joon-young; Ep. 191–194: Joon Park (g.o.d), Jo Dong-hyuk, Sam Hammington, Hwang Chi-yeul, Gong Hyun-joo, Haeryung (Bestie); Notes: Because of another schedule, Yoon Doo-joon & Yong Jun-hyung appeared in the end of episode 186. Jung Joon-young finished the trip and left early in episode 189 due to 2 Days & 1 Night's schedule.

=== Panama ===
Episode #	Title	Location	Air date
195–202	Law of the Jungle in Panama	Panama	January 8, 2016 – February 26, 2016
Theme: Surviving in Unknown (1st Half), Searching for Gold (2nd Half); Members: Kim Byung-man, Lee Jang-woo; Ep. 195–198: Oh Ji-ho, Son Eun-seo, Ahn Se-ha, Hong Jong-hyun; Ep. 199 (Gold Expedition Special): Oh Ji-ho, Ahn Se-ha, Park Yu-hwan; Ep. 200–202: Lee Jong-won, Hwang Woo-seul-hye, Hwanhee (Fly to the Sky), Bora (Sistar), Park Yu-hwan, Sungyeol (Infinite); Notes: The 23rd trip started with the cast visiting the Panama Canal. After heading back to the ocean, they are blindfolded and found themselves in the middle of nowhere with only a raft to use to accomplish their first mission, which is to find an island which will become their survival zone. They eventually arrived at one of the San Blas Islands. In the 199th episode, Son Eun-seo and Hong Jong-hyun were replaced by Park Yu-hwan and the 5 men went on a gold expedition special in Camino Real. The cast of the second half were taken to Alajuela Lake and were introduced to the Embera people. For the show's 200th episode, they granted viewers' wishes from the show, such as the cast building a tree house and making Geisha coffee which they would have to find in the jungle.

=== Tonga ===
Episode #	Title	Location	Air date
203–211	Law of the Jungle in Tonga	Tonga	March 4, 2016 – April 29, 2016
Theme: Vacation; Members: Kim Byung-man, Go Se-won, Seo Kang-joon (5urprise); Ep. 203–207: Jeon Hye-bin, Hong Yoon-hwa, Jota (Madtown); Ep. 204–207: Sandeul (B1A4); Ep. 208–211: Lee Hoon, Chansung (2PM), Sungjong (Infinite), Seolhyun (AOA); Notes: With the youngest cast the show's ever had, the members of the first half are informed by the staff that their first survival location would be Hitofua. Since they were expecting an island, they are shocked upon learning that they would have to stay in a shipwreck for 56 hours. Hitofua was the only tugboat in Tonga in the 1900s and was left abandoned near the shore after it was hit by a tsunami in 1982. After completing the mission, the tribe was split into two teams with Kim Byung-man and the two oldest members Jeon Hye-bin and Go Se-won heading to Eua Island, while the rest are taken to another island. Kim Byung-man sustained an injury while trying to climb down what they didn't realize at the time was a cliff. In the other team, Jota cut his leg while attempting to open a coconut and the staff had to take him to the nearest hospital. The new cast joins Seo Kang-jun and Go Se-won for the second half and they head to one of the islands of Vavaʻu. In the final episode, they were introduced to a tribe in Tonga who taught them about their culture and traditions. They finished filming for the season, however, because of Cyclone Winston which prevented them from leaving, the cast and crew were stuck in Vavaʻu for 72 hours. Tonga edition is the first time Kim Byung-man's tribe got tuna when fishing.

=== Papua New Guinea ===
Episode #	Title	Location	Air date
212–219	Law of the Jungle in Papua New Guinea	Papua New Guinea	May 6, 2016 – June 24, 2016
Theme: The Women Special (1st Half), Movie-Like Jungle Survival (2nd Half); Members: Kim Byung-man; Ep. 212–216: Choi Song-hyun, Kim Ji-min, Choi Yoon-young, Sojin (Girl's Day), Kangnam (M.I.B), Oh Ha-young (Apink); Ep. 216–219: Jang Hyun-sung, Lee Tae-gon, Jang Hee-jin, Super Junior (Leeteuk, Kangin), Shownu (Monsta X); Notes: In the first half, the female guests are challenged to survive in the wild for 100 hours. For the first 24 hours, they are given the option to surrender and leave the show but past that, they must stay and finish the trip. The youngest member, Apink's Oh Hayoung, was stung by a scorpion on the first day while building their shelter. Kangin's parts in the second half were cut due to his DUI incident.

=== New Caledonia ===
Episode #	Title	Location	Air date
220–228	Law of the Jungle in New Caledonia	New Caledonia	July 1, 2016 – August 26, 2016
Theme: Pretty Boys Special (1st Half), Flower Middle-Aged Special (2nd Half); Members: Kim Byung-man; Ep. 220–224: Hong Seok-cheon, Heo Kyung-hwan, Kim Young-kwang, Yoon Park, Yuri (Girls' Generation), Cha Eun-woo (Astro); Ep. 225–228: Joon Park (g.o.d), Han Jae-suk, David Lee McInnis, Hyun Joo-yup, Choi Yeo-jin, Jeongyeon (Twice); Notes: Inspired by a famous line from Boys Over Flowers which had scenes filmed in New Caledonia, the staff asked the cast to transfer from their boat to a pirogue which they will use to sail to one of the islands of L'Île-des-Pins which will serve as their first survival location. The staff also confiscated their bags which they returned after 24 hours. On the third day, each member was asked to choose between two cards which had 'Sky' and 'Earth' written on it, unaware of what it meant. They were then ordered to move to the island of whatever card they chose and eventually found out that 'Sky' meant Paradise, which is a large and lush island while 'Earth' stood for Hades or Hell, which is a small barren island with a dangerous rocky terrain. Each team spent 24 hours on their respective islands before returning to their original survival location. The cast of the second half traveled to Deva which, unlike Ile Des Pins, is mostly grasslands and mountains. They were first tasked to ride horses to their next destination, but on the way there, a horse kicked Jeongyeon's ankle by accident which injured her as a result. She was immediately taken to a hospital to get examined and treated. Despite the staff's suggestion that she return to South Korea for safety, Jeongyeon stayed with the tribe and used a wooden crutch the chief Kim Byung-man crafted for her. However, the cast was forced to move camp earlier than planned because of a storm that could lead to them getting stranded because of the mountains that surrounded the area. Jeongyeon was eventually forced to return to South Korea first. Three of the remaining members including Kim Byung-man visited the Dogny falls while the rest were taken to Deva Deltas. As a final mission, the cast went skydiving.

=== Mongolia ===
Episode #	Title	Location	Air date
229–237	Law of the Jungle in Mongolia	Mongolia	September 2, 2016 – October 28, 2016
Theme: Nomad (1st Half), Taiga Survival (2nd Half); Members: Kim Byung-man, Lee Chun-hee; Ep. 229–233: Ye Ji-won, Kim Min-kyo, Kangnam (M.I.B), Seo In-guk, Lee Sun-bin; Ep. 234–237: Ryu Seung-soo, Julien Kang, Park Se-young, Eric Nam, Changsub (BTOB); Notes: With 'Nomads' as their theme, the cast must travel to four locations and over 10,000 km of land in Mongolia. The members of the first half were dropped off by a helicopter on Gobi Desert and were only given two camels to ride. They also met real nomads who they bartered with for food. After surviving in the desert for 3 days, they headed east to Khentii Province. Kim Byung-man, Kim Min-kyo and Lee Chun-hee were separated from the rest and went west to the Altai Mountains to meet the Kazakhs to learn the basics of being an eagle hunter while the rest stayed the night. The cast of the second half traveled north to a taiga. On the third day, they were separated into two teams, one team in Lake Khuvsgul and another who will meet the Tsaatan tribe.

=== East Timor ===
Episode #	Title	Location	Air date
238–246	Law of the Jungle in East Timor	East Timor	November 4, 2016 – December 30, 2016
Theme: Singers' Special (1st Half), Forget Time (2nd Half); Members: Kim Byung-man, Hwang Chi-yeul; Ep. 238–240: Lee Sang-min, Yoon Min-soo, Jung Joon-young (Drug Restaurant), Yang Yo-seob (BEAST), Kwon Nara (Hello Venus); Ep. 241–246: Lee Moon-sik, Kwon Oh-joong, Kim Hwan, Oh Chang-seok, Yoo In-young, Kangnam (M.I.B); Notes: The celebrities who joined the singer special were challenged to survive on a barren island for three days. On the first day, they had to do a solo survival mission which includes hunting and building shelter on their own. The tribe was divided into three units of two on the second day and only worked as one group on the last day. Hwang Chi-yeul stayed with Kim Byung-man and joined the cast of the second half who were given their second mission, which is to survive without the time and had their watches taken. Hwang Chi-yeul left before the tribe traveled to Jaco Island.

=== Kota Manado ===
Episode #	Title	Location	Air date
247–255	Law of the Jungle in Kota Manado	Manado, Sulawesi, Indonesia	January 6, 2017 – March 3, 2017
Theme: The Rising Star of 2017 (1st Half), Let Me to Introduce My Friend (2nd Half); Members: Kim Byung-man; Ep. 247–251: Yoon Da-hoon, Solbi, Sleepy (Untouchable), Jin (BTS), Gong Myung (5urprise), Cheng Xiao (WJSN); Ep. 252–255: Yoon Jung-soo & Kim Young-chul, Kangnam, Kim Min-seok & Sungyeol (Infinite), Kyungri (Nine Muses) & Kang Tae-oh (5urprise); Notes: On episode 251, Jin finished the trip and left the show early for another schedule. Kangnam became a regular member. On episode 254, Yoon Jung-soo finished the trip and left the show early for another schedule. Kim Young-chul also left the trip early on episode 255.

=== Sumatra ===
Episode #	Title	Location	Air date
256–264	Law of the Jungle in Sumatra	Sumatra, Indonesia	March 17, 2017 – May 12, 2017
Theme: Survive on the Land of Disasters (1st half), In Search of Mentawai Tribe (2nd half); Members: Kim Byung-man, Kwak Si-yang; Ep. 256–261: Lee Byung-kyu, KCM, Jo Se-ho, BtoB (Peniel, Sungjae), Kim Se-jeong (Gugudan); Ep. 261–264: Ji Sang-ryeol, Kangnam, Choi Jong-hoon (F.T. Island), Jo Bo-ah, Shin (Cross Gene); Notes: Tricked into thinking they were going to visit a resort, the cast of the first half arrived in comfortable vacation clothes and soon realize that they were going to visit an abandoned island resort that was hit by a tsunami in 2009, revealing the theme of the first half which is 'Survive on the Land of Disasters'. Their luggage were taken from them and were left with the clothes they had on as they scavenged for items that they'll use for survival, such as for hunting food. On the third night, they decided to sleep in the covered area of the dock, unaware that the roof had holes in them. They had to sleep cold and soaking wet because of the rain. The following morning, they were split into two groups with Sungjae and Peniel travelling to Mount Sibayak with Kim Byung-man while the rest went through a tunnel that was built by slaves during the Japanese occupation of the country. While attempting to cut bamboo, KCM cut his hand with his saw and had to be brought to a local hospital near the area. The second part begins with the cast travelling to the island Siberut to meet the Mentawai Tribe. To reach the tribe, they will travel for 6 hours using pompongs and the rest of the way on foot. Upon their arrival, they are welcomed with a feast and taught about the tribe's culture. They were also given tips on hunting and fishing, particularly the use of Derris roots. Some of the men played a game of Yut in which the loser will get a traditional tattoo done by an elder from the village.

=== New Zealand ===
Episode #	Title	Location	Air date
265–273	Law of the Jungle in Wild New Zealand	North Island, New Zealand, Oceania	May 19, 2017 – July 14, 2017
Theme: Travel up North Island; Members: Kim Byung-man, Kangnam; Ep. 265–270: Shindong (Super Junior), Uee (After School); Ep. 265–268: Park Chul-min, Sung Hoon, Mark (Got7); Ep. 268–270: Lee Jae-yoon, Jung Eun-ji (Apink), Microdot; Ep. 270–273: Lee Kyung-kyu, Kim Hwan, Lee Jae-yoon, Soyou (Sistar), Microdot; Notes: Upon their arrival in the country, they are immediately brought to the Cape Palliser Lighthouse which is in the southernmost point of the North Island. They are tasked to travel 1,300 km to the northernmost point of the island which also serves as the theme of the season. They are briefed by the staff about New Zealand's strict environmental laws and are given a chart to measure the seafood they are allowed to catch and eat. They spent the first night in Cape Palliser near the beach where Kim Byung-man claimed it's the toughest sea he's ever faced out of all his trips. He later revealed that they came at a bad time and a super cyclone is passing between New Zealand and Australia, filming the season during Cyclone Debbie and Cyclone Cook which was eventually considered the worst cyclone to hit the country since 1968. The next morning they moved up to Lake Taupō where they can have the choice of bungee jumping to be brought to their next location by boat or walk two hours down the mountain. Byung-man, Mark, Sung Hoon and Uee took the first option while the rest walked. While building their shelter, the heavy rain forced them to stop. This also made hunting for food more difficult. While preparing their dinner, the water level rose and reached their camp, forcing them to move farther away from the shore. It doesn't stop raining even until the morning and the staff's equipment gets swept away by the waves. They decided to evacuate the area. While the rest went back to South Korea, Byung-man, Kangnam, Uee and Shindong continued with the trip and moved to Tairua. They are joined by Lee Jae Yoon, Microdot, and Eunji. Initially, the cast was asked to choose between 'wolf' which is actually Wolf Island and 'elephant' for the Elephant Rocks, but on the way to the Elephant Rocks, they saw the state of roads after the landslides caused by the rain and are informed that the road has been closed, forcing them to join the others on Wolf Island. Shindong, Uee and Eunji left the tribe in the 270th episode and the rest continued travelling north to Mangamuka, where they will meet up with the new members Kim Hwan, Soyou and Lee Kyung-kyu who had just arrived in the country. On their third day there, Kyung-kyu, Kangnam and Microdot went out to the sea to go fishing. Meanwhile, the rest headed east to the beach to look for clams. On their last day, they finally finished their journey after reaching Cape Reinga, the northernmost point of the island. They completed their trip by attaching a directional sign to Seoul on the lighthouse's signpost.

=== Komodo ===
Episode #	Title	Location	Air date
274–282	Law of the Jungle in Komodo	Komodo & Flores Island, East Nusa Tenggara, Indonesia	July 21, 2017 – September 15, 2017
Theme: Legend of Komodo (1st Half), Legend of Hobbit (2nd Half); Members: Kim Byung-man, Song Jae-hee; Ep. 274–278: Yang Dong-geun, Lee Wan, Jo Jeong-sik, Kangnam, Hani (EXID), Mingyu (Seventeen); Ep. 278–282: Lee Soo-geun, Choi Won-young, Yang Jeong-won, Hongbin (VIXX), Lee Tae-hwan (5urprise), Yerin (GFriend); Notes: Their flight was delayed due to heavy rains and the cast was stuck in the airport for hours. The cast was completely unaware of their destination which was only revealed upon their arrival on the island through a video. Byung-man, Kangnam and Dong-geun built a shelter designed to protect the tribe from the Komodo dragons that roamed freely all over Komodo Island while the rest explored the area around it. They encountered what they thought was a Komodo dragon but was in fact only a model the staff prepared as a warning, revealing that they were actually on one of the Gili Islands where there were no Komodo dragons which they will only see the next day after moving camp. The next morning they traveled to Komodo island by boat and learned survival tips from the Komodo rangers residing there. On their third day, they were split up into two teams to join Komodo rangers on their patrol on the surrounding islands. Byung-man, Dong-geun and Jeong-sik spent the night on another island, while the rest of the tribe stayed and joined the rangers' patrol there. They reunited the next day out in the ocean where they dive together and the first half ends with them coming across a manta ray. The cast of the second half meet up on Flores island, east of the original destination with the theme "Legend of the Hobbit", referring to their quest to find the Ebu gogo or "the little people". It was revealed in the episode that after a schedule in Taiwan, Hongbin missed his flight and only appeared in a self-filmed video message, announcing his intentions to follow. They hiked across the mountains in search of a cave where the Ebu gogo were rumored to have lived. In 2003, the Homo floresiensis was first discovered in a limestone cave in the island and were named after it. They were tasked to live like the hobbits in the legend told by the tribesmen residing there. They climbed down a 15-meter cliff using a rope to reach the cave and spent the night there. The same instructions required them to split up the next morning into two teams to look for a safer area. One team traveled to a seaside cave while one went to a cave in the forest. Hongbin, who has finally arrived in the country, went straight to Byung-man's group, who were inside the seaside cave. Meanwhile, Yerin and Jeong-won from Won-young's group caught a bayawak in the cave which they brought back to their original camp and Yerin prepared it as their dinner. On their way back, they were also taught how to make Arrack which they decided to make in the camp. After spending the night on the beach, Byung-man's group moved to another island by boat and Won-young's group followed. The cast ended their trip on the island.

=== Fiji ===
Episode #	Title	Location	Air date
283–292	Law of the Jungle in Fiji	Fiji, Pacific Ocean	September 22, 2017 – November 24, 2017
Theme: Survive Like a Movie (1st Half), Go Round the "Gods' Garden" Taveuni (2nd Half); Members: Ep. 283–287: Choo Sung-hoon, Noh Woo-jin, Oh Jong-hyuk, DinDin, Jeong Da-rae, Roy Kim, Chaekyung (April), Jaehyun (NCT); Ep. 288–292: Lee Moon-sik, Lee Tae-gon, Ryu Dam, Kangnam, Jeong Jin-woon (2AM), Apink (Park Cho-rong, Yoon Bo-mi), Yunhyeong (iKon); Notes: Before departing for the 33rd season in July 2017, the show's creator and acting chief Kim Byung-man injured his spine while skydiving and had to miss the trip for the first time since the show's creation in 2011. To make up for his absence, the show invited Law of the Jungle veterans who have appeared the most times on the show. The first half begins with the cast being dropped off at a beach where they were greeted by various packages from around the world. They were given the theme of the first half, which is "Like a Movie". They were informed that they were on Monuriki island, where the 2000 movie Cast Away was filmed. Their luggage were confiscated and they were tasked to survive using only whatever items are in the packages as a reference to the film where Tom Hanks' character only had the FedEx boxes that were washed away with him on the island. The items they received were the same items in the film, such as ice skates, a volleyball, a dress, VHS tapes and even items Hanks' character only acquired later on such as a flashlight and boots. The cast attempted to build a fire for hours without their tools but were unsuccessful, becoming the first tribe to spend the night without a fire. The next morning Jong-suk, Da-rae and Jaehyun traveled to the other end of the island along the beach to look for a better survival area, while Sung-hoon's team took the longer route through the mountains. Sung-hoon's team traveled for 3 hours only to realize that they went around in a circle and ended up back where they started. Because of the time lost, they decided to remain there. They were reunited the next day and were given another mission, which is to escape from the island using only a raft, similar to the end of the film. After successfully reaching the other island, they were once again separated into two teams, with Sung-hoon, Woo-jin, Jaehyun and Chaekyung heading to the Navua River, where Anacondas: The Hunt for the Blood Orchid was filmed while the rest of the cast went to the Yasawa Islands where the 1980 film The Blue Lagoon was filmed. Meanwhile, Jong-suk was given a separate mission which is to feed sharks. After completing his task, he joined Sung-hoon's team by replacing Jaehyun who had to leave earlier than the rest, ending his trip on Episode 286. The second half started on episode 288, with the cast heading to Taveuni island which is also called "Garden of the Gods". They were tasked to visit every unique hidden geographical site on the map. On their first day, they made camp on the beach and divided tasks among the members such as hunting for food, building their shelter, and gathering materials. While searching for food, they came across the waterfall on the map. While they were sleeping, the water level rose fast at dawn the next day due to heavy rain and reached their shelter which they quickly attempted to repair. Chorong had to seek medical attention for her swollen eye which got irritated by the ash from the bonfire that she was tending to the whole night. Later, they separated into three teams to fully explore the island. Ryu Dam, Moon-sik and Bomi's team first came across the mushroom rocks located on the beach and they continued walking until they reached a natural water slide on the island but had to evacuate the area immediately due to the heavy rain. Kangnam and Jinwoon also tried to fish by the river, but also had to leave. They were informed that it will continue to rain for hours and their current shelter will be flooded by then. For their safety, they decided to move to another location to set up their camp. However, because they couldn't go anywhere yet because of the heavy rain, the cast and the staff had to spend one more night in the area. The next morning, Tae-gon and Ryu Dam went out to the sea by boat to fish. Meanwhile, Kangnam, Jinwoon and Bomi visited the Rainbow Reef. Moon-sik, Yunhyeong returned to the water slide with Chorong who had already recovered. Later, they also spotted a blowhole. Kangnam, Jiwoon and Bomi went to see a septuple waterfall and caught fish there. Tae-gon and Ryu Dam fished for hours by boat on the sea and managed to catch a dolphinfish which was shared among the cast and crew. On their third day, they traveled to the west of the island. They were given a last mission, which is to choose a member who will have to survive on their own, something Kim Byung-man does on occasion in the past seasons. Moon-sik volunteered and was separated from the group for one night. Their final stop is the lighthouse in the far west of the island.

=== Cook Islands ===
Episode #	Title	Location	Air date
293–301	Law of the Jungle in Cook Islands	Cook Islands, South Pacific Ocean	December 1, 2017 – January 26, 2018
Theme: Atiu Adventure Survival (1st Half), Aitutaki Separation Survival (2nd Half); Members: Kim Byung-man, Kangnam; Ep. 293–298: Pak Se-ri, Lee Chun-hee, Kim Hwan, Lee Jong-hyun (CNBLUE), Solbin (Laboum), Jay B (Got7); Ep. 299–301: Park Jung-chul, Kim Jung-tae, Lee Da-hee, Jung Joon-young, Niel (Teen Top), Byungchan (Victon); Notes: Kim Byung-man confirmed his return on October 13, 2017 after recovering from his spinal injury.

=== Patagonia ===
Episode #	Title	Location	Air date
302–310	Law of the Jungle in Patagonia	Patagonia (part of Chile), South America	February 2, 2018 – April 6, 2018
Theme: Glacier Survival at Minus 20 Degrees (Level 1), Survive in the Wilderness (Level 2), 5000m Altitude Alpine Survival (Level 3); Members: Kim Byung-man; Ep. 302–305: Kim Seung-soo, Hong Jin-young, Kim Dong-jun (ZE:A), JR (NU'EST), Minhyuk (Monsta X), Chaeyeon (DIA); Ep. 305–310: Kim Sung-ryung, Jo Jae-yoon, Kim Jong-min, Cho Yoon-woo, Rowoon (SF9), Kim Jin-kyung; Notes: As a regular member, Kangnam wasn't able to join the tribe due to his flu. In addition, Kim Byung-man left before the tribe reach the Alpine to film for the next season in Antarctica.

=== Antarctica ===
Episode #	Title	Location	Air date
311–314	Law of the Jungle in Antarctica	Antarctica	April 13, 2018 – May 11, 2018
Theme: Using Only Solar Energy to Survive in Antarctica; Members: Kim Byung-man, Jeon Hye-bin, Kim Young-kwang; Notes: This trip is a special project to celebrate for the 300th episode. Also, the show set a milestone by being the first Korean reality TV to successfully send a team to the Antarctic on a survival mission. In addition, 4K UHD HDR (Ultra-HD High Dynamic Range) resolution is used for broadcasting – the first time for a Korean TV program. This is to capture the undisrupted frozen beauty of Antarctica. Special appearance on episode 312-313 by Robert Swan and his son, Barney.

=== Mexico ===
Episode #	Title	Location	Air date
314–324	Law of the Jungle in Mexico	Yucatán Peninsula & Lacandon Jungle, Mexico	May 11, 2018 – July 20, 2018
Theme: 24 Hours Pirate Ship Survival (1st Half), Feast in Mexico (2nd Half); Members: Kim Byung-man; Ep. 314–320: Oh Man-seok, Han Eun-jung, Choi Jung-won, BtoB (Eunkwang, Hyunsik), Jota/Lee Jong-hwa, Seol In-ah; Ep. 320–324: Choi Hyun-seok, Kim Jun-hyun, Julien Kang, Kangnam, Nam Bo-ra, Lee Seung-hoon (Winner), Seulgi (Red Velvet); Notes: For teams in part 1, they lived in Yucatán Peninsula. In part 2, the teams lived inside Yucatán part of Lacandon Jungle, where they lived amongst Lacandon Mayans. Seulgi revealed that she was a girl scout leader and an A-student in PE. Teams in part 2 also had one of the stops with the most abundant food and resources around, with a professional chef and a great angler on board.

=== Sabah ===
Episode #	Title	Location	Air date
325–333	Law of the Jungle in Sabah	Sabah, Malaysia	July 27, 2018 – September 21, 2018
Theme: Escaping Survival from Asia's Amazon (1st Half), 24 Hours Survival on Garbage Island (2nd Half); Members: Kim Byung-man, Park Jung-chul; Ep. 325–329: Park Sol-mi, Tony Ahn (H.O.T.), Park Sung-kwang, Sung Hoon, Kim Nam-joo (Apink), Wanna One (Ha Sung-woon, Ong Seong-wu); Ep. 330–333: Shinhwa (Eric Mun, Lee Min-woo, Andy Lee), Lee Da-hee, Yoon Shi-yoon, Kangnam, Jang Dong-yoon

=== Indian Ocean 2 ===
Episode #	Title	Location	Air date
334–343	Law of the Jungle in Last Indian Ocean	Sri Lanka & Maldives, Indian Ocean	September 28, 2018 – December 14, 2018
Theme: Sri Lanka Wild Elephant Survival in the Jungle! (1st Half), Jekyll and Hyde? Two Faces of the Ground Paradise Maldives! (2nd Half); Members: Kim Byung-man; Ep. 334–339: Kim Sung-soo, Don Spike, Kangnam, Moon Ga-bi; Ep. 334–337: Lee Sang-hwa, Kwak Yoon-gy, Jeong Se-woon; Ep. 338–339: Boom, Kim Do-yeon (Weki Meki), Lucas (NCT); Ep. 340–343: Jo Jae-yoon, Jung Gyu-woon, Lee Yong-dae, Lee Yu-bi, Minhyuk (BtoB), Jun (U-KISS/UNB), Yeonwoo (Momoland)

=== Northern Mariana Islands ===
Episode #	Title	Location	Air date
344–352	Law of the Jungle in Northern Mariana Islands	Northern Mariana Islands, Pacific Ocean	December 21, 2018 – February 23, 2019
Theme: A Heavenly Island, Hope Survival on Northern Mariana Islands! (1st Half), A Pure Island, Survive on Rota! (2nd Half); Members: Kim Byung-man; Ep. 344–348: Lee Jong-hyuk, Oh Jong-hyuk, Yang Se-chan, Lee Joo-yeon, Park Tae-hwan, Bona (WJSN), Juyeon (The Boyz); Ep. 349–352: Lee Yeon-bok, Ji Sang-ryeol, Lee Tae-gon, Han Bo-reum, Kim Yoon-sang, Yugyeom (Got7), Lu (Nature)

=== Chatham Islands ===
Episode #	Title	Location	Air date
353–362	Law of the Jungle in Chatham Islands	Chatham Islands & Tasman District, South Island, New Zealand, Pacific Ocean	March 2, 2019 – May 4, 2019
Theme: Law of the Jungle in Chatham (1st Half), Law of the Jungle in Tasman (2nd Half); Members: Kim Byung-man; Ep. 353–357: Don Spike, Kim In-kwon, Kim Jong-min (Koyote), Kwon Nara (Hello Venus), Baekho (NU'EST), Moon Ga-bi; Ep. 358–362: Kim Seung-soo, Julien Kang, Kang Kyung-joon, Kang Ki-young; Ep. 358–360: Yoon Park, Yoon Bo-ra, Nancy (Momoland); Ep. 360–362: Park Sung-kwang, Ko Sung-hee, Bomin (Golden Child)

=== Thailand ===
Episode #	Title	Location	Air date
363–372	Law of the Jungle in Lost Jungle & Island	Trang / Krabi, Thailand	May 11, 2019 – July 13, 2019
Theme: A Hopeless Land 'Lost Jungle' (1st Half), Be Trapped in the Middle of a 'Lost Island' (2nd Half); Members: Kim Byung-man; Ep. 363–367: Park Ho-san, Park Jung-chul, Hyun Woo, Uhm Hyun-kyung, Jung Chan-sung, Park Woo-jin (AB6IX), Mina (Gugudan); Ep. 368–372: Kim Roi-ha, Lee Seung-yoon, Heo Kyung-hwan, Song Won-seok, Lee Yul-eum, B.I (iKon), Yeri (Red Velvet); Notes: B.I's parts in the second half was cut due to his drug scandal incident.

=== Myanmar ===
Episode #	Title	Location	Air date
372–382	Law of the Jungle in Myanmar and Myeik	Myeik, Myanmar	July 13, 2019 – September 21, 2019
Theme: Law of the Jungle in Myanmar (1st Half), Law of the Jungle in Myeik (2nd Half); Members: Kim Byung-man; Ep. 372–377, 381: Sean (Jinusean), Noh Woo-jin, Dong Hyun Kim, Hong Soo-ah, Moon Sung-min, Hongseok (Pentagon), BM (Kard), Saebom (Nature); Ep. 378–380, 382: Park Jung-chul, Oh Dae-hwan, Ahn Chang-hwan, Han Bo-reum, Go Young-bin, Sanha (Astro), Yuqi ((G)I-dle); Notes: Episode 381 repeated some scenes from the first half for celebrating Chuseok day.

=== Sunda Islands ===
Episode #	Title	Location	Air date
383–392	Law of the Jungle in Sunda Islands	North Sulawesi, Sunda Islands, Indonesia	September 28, 2019 – December 7, 2019
Theme: Appointed Survival (1st Half), Concentric Survival (2nd Half); Members: Kim Byung-man, Noh Woo-jin; Ep. 383–387: Park Sang-won, Hur Jae, Kim Byung-hyun, Ha Yeon-joo, Cho Jun-ho, Kim Dong-han, Yena (April); Ep. 388–392: Kim Soo-yong, Jo Bin (Norazo), Oh Dae-hwan, Kang Kyung-joon, Bae Yoon-kyung, Doyoung (NCT), JooE (Momoland)

=== Chuuk ===
Episode #	Title	Location	Air date
393–402	Law of the Jungle in Chuuk and Pohnpei	Chuuk and Pohnpei, Micronesia, Pacific Ocean	December 14, 2019 – February 22, 2020
Theme: Law of the Jungle in Chuuk: "Real Distress Escape" (1st Half), Law of the Jungle in Pohnpei: "Seven Treasures' Mystery Finding" (2nd Half); Members: Kim Byung-man, Noh Woo-jin; Ep. 393–397: Matthew Douma, Lee Tae-gon, Yoo Jae-hwan, Jeon So-mi, Han Hyun-min, Lee Jeong-hyun; Ep. 398–402: Yu Oh-seong, Choiza (Dynamic Duo), KCM, Austin Kang, Kim Da-som, Johyun (Berry Good)

=== Palawan ===
Episode #	Title	Location	Air date
403–415	Law of the Jungle in Palawan	Coron, Palawan & Palawan Island, Philippines	February 29, 2020 – April 18, 2020; May 9, 2020 – June 6, 2020
Theme: "Hunger Game 2" (400th Episode Special), Survive with the Batac tribe (1st Half), Experience the Thrilling Adventures with Mysterious Animal Friends on Coron Island (2nd Half); Members: Kim Byung-man, Noh Woo-jin; Ep. 403–406 (400th Episode Special): Yoon Do-hyun, Sean (Jinusean), Lee Seung-yoon, Oh Jong-hyuk, Han Bo-reum, Park Tae-hwan, Hani (EXID); Ep. 407–410: Woo Ji-won, Lee Sang-joon, Yang Se-hyung, Hahm Eun-jung (T-ara), Jin Hae-sung, Dayoung (WJSN); Ep. 411–415: Lee Young-pyo, Song Jin-woo, Kim Yo-han, Lee Chae-young, Kim Jae-hwan, Yein (Lovelyz); Notes: Special appearance by chef Lee Won-il on episode 406 for celebrating the 400th episode special. On the first main part, cast members joined Batak tribe's village and learned about their culture. Before leaving the village, cast members played 3-on-3 basketball game with Batak tribe member, and made playground for Batak tribe child member. On the second main part, cast members stayed on Coron Island and had complete missions for gaining stamps. On the first day on Coron, when trying to completing mission, Song Jin-woo and Lee Chae-young got attacked by bees, and must be hospitalize; they returned to base camp on last day of survival. After collecting seven stamps, cast members got chance to join other volunteers to clean trash near Manila Bay. Special appearance by Nancy (Momoland) on episode 415 for helping other cast members. Episode 415 is the last episode of Law of the Jungle before hiatus due to the COVID-19 pandemic.

=== South Korea ===
Episode #	Title	Location	Air date
416–419	Law of the Jungle in Wild Korea	South Korea	August 29, 2020 – September 19, 2020
Theme: Survive from the Disaster that Started Unexpectedly; Members: Kim Byung-man, Lee Bong-won, Hur Jae, Park Mi-sun, Chan Ho Park, Choo Sung-hoon, Pak Se-ri, Heo Hoon, Chungha; Notes: This is the first domestic recording in the program history.

Episode #	Title	Location	Air date
420–422	Law of the Jungle – Hunter and Chef	Saseungbong Island, Ongjin, Incheon, South Korea	September 26, 2020 – October 17, 2020
Theme: Hunter and Chef; Members: Kim Byung-man, Im Ji-ho, Kim Gu-ra, Kim Kang-woo, Lee Yong-jin, Gong Seung-yeon

Episode #	Title	Location	Air date
423–426	Law of the Jungle – Zero Point	South Korea	October 24, 2020 – November 14, 2020
Theme: Escape from Zero Point (Lack, State of Nothingness); Members: Kim Byung-man, Lee Seung-yoon, Pak Se-ri, Gary, Heo Kyung-hwan, Yoon Eun-hye, Ki Do-hoon

Episode #	Title	Location	Air date
427–429	Law of the Jungle – Tribe Chief and Granny	South Korea	November 21, 2020 – December 5, 2020
Theme: "Mother's Seasonal Meal Table" with National Mother Kim Soo-mi; Members: Kim Byung-man, Kim Soo-mi, Park Mi-sun, Kim Kang-woo, Kangnam, Jessi, Yang Ji-il; Notes: 1st journey Kangnam return as tribe member after married. On episode 427, Kim Byung-man, Park Mi-sun, and Kim Kang-woo went to Namde Stream in Yangyang, Gangwon Province for finding salmon, although failed find any of them. On episode 428, Yang Ji-il and Park Mi-sun went hiking for finding wild pine mushroom and wild wood-cultivated ginseng. Kangnam and Jessi went and harvested rice. While Kim Byung-man and Kim Kang-woo went to Hoengseong Lake for hunting largemouth bass with help from Korea Invasive Species Management Team. On episode 429, Park Mi-sun, Kangnam, and Yang Ji-il went to sea for fishing; Park Mi-sun managed to get 1 47 cm codfish. Kim Byung-man and Kim Kang-woo went to Sea of Japan for hunting, and managed to find many of huge rock oysters and mussels.

Episode #	Title	Location	Air date
430–433	Law of the Jungle in Ulleungdo & Dokdo	Ulleungdo & Dokdo, Ulleung, North Gyeongsang Province, South Korea	December 12, 2020 – January 9, 2021
Theme: Challenge to Explore Ulleungdo and Dokdo by Crossing the Ground and Sea; Members: Kim Byung-man, Park Soo-hong, Lee Jong-kook; Ep. 430–431: Oh Jong-hyuk, Song Jin-woo, Lee Sang-yi, Arin (Oh My Girl); Ep. 432–433: Park Mi-sun, Gary, Julien Kang, Go Joon-hee, Chanyeol (EXO)

Episode #	Title	Location	Air date
434–437	Law of the Jungle – Stove League	Jeju Island, South Korea	January 16, 2021 – February 6, 2021
Theme: Special Survival Field Training in Jeju Island; Members: Kim Byung-man, Hur Jae, Lee Dong-gook, Kim Tae-gyun, Dae-ho Lee, Lee Cho-hee, Na Tae-ju, Jung Yoo-in; Ep. 436–437: Tak Jae-hoon, Defconn, Nine (OnlyOneOf)

Episode #	Title	Location	Air date
438–442	Law of the Jungle – Pioneers	Goheung, South Jeolla Province, South Korea	February 20, 2021 – March 20, 2021
Theme: Survival on a Remote Island without People and Warmth; Members: Kim Byung-man, Jang Hyuk, Shin Seung-hwan, Choi Sung-min, Bakgoon, Choi Min-ho (Shinee), Kang Daniel; Ep. 440–442: Song Hoon; Ep. 441–442: Ji-man Choi, Ham Yeon-ji

Episode #	Title	Location	Air date
443–445	Law of the Jungle – Masters of Survival	South Korea	March 27, 2021 – April 10, 2021
Theme: Challenge Bare-handed Survival without any Luggage or Tools!; Members: Kim Byung-man, Rhymer, Lee Dong-gook, Choi Sung-min, Bakgoon, Kanto, Kang Eun-mi

Episode #	Title	Location	Air date
446–448	Law of the Jungle – Spring Special in Jeju	Jeju Island, South Korea	April 17, 2021 – May 1, 2021
Theme: Exploration Jeju Island by Crossing the Ground and the Sea.; Members: Kim Byung-man, Ji Sang-ryeol, Park Tae-hwan, Bakgoon, Baekho (NU'EST), Kim Hye-yoon, Chuu (Loona); Notes: On episode 448, they celebrated Bakgoon's birthday, with meat provided by production team (1st time on history of the show). They also make some documentary shoot about Manjanggul Cave (the biggest vertical lava cave in Jeju Island) and The Soft Coral Colony in Seogwipo; the videos were broadcast via their official channel on Youtube.

Episode #	Title	Location	Air date
449–450	Law of the Jungle – Wild Wild West	Ansan, South Korea	May 8, 2021 – May 15, 2021
Theme: Invincible Survival in the Wild Nature of the West Sea; Members: Kim Byung-man, Jung Ho-young, Choi Sung-min, Hong Hyun-hee, Park Ki-woong, Jasson, Seunghee (Oh My Girl)

Episode #	Title	Location	Air date
451–452	Law of the Jungle – Pent Island: Island of Desire	Tongyeong, South Korea	May 22, 2021 – May 29, 2021
Members: Kim Byung-man, Yu Oh-seong, Ha Do-kwon, Jun Jin (Shinhwa), Choi Sung-min, Seol In-ah; Notes: This is the last domestic recording.
