= Go Show =

- Genre: Talk show
- Starring: Go Hyun-jung; Jung Hyung-don; Kim Young-chul; Yoon Jong-shin
- Country of origin: South Korea
- Original language: Korean
- No. of episodes: 35

Production
- Producers: Min Eui-shik; Lee Seung-hoon; Yu Da-hyun
- Running time: 60-90 minutes per episode

Original release
- Network: SBS
- Release: April 6 – December 21, 2012

GO Show (Korean: 고쇼) was a South Korean talk show which began airing on April 6, 2012 on Friday nights at 11:05 pm KST on SBS. It is hosted by famed actress, Go Hyun-jung, who starred in highly rated dramas such as Sandglass and Queen Seondeok. This is the first talk show she has hosted, with the help of comedians Jung Hyung-don, Kim Young-chul, and Yoon Jong-shin. Originally, only 25 episodes were ordered by SBS, ending the show in early October. However, with a solid audience and Go Hyun-jung's improving hosting skills, the show has been renewed until the end of year. The program ended with 35 episodes on December 21, 2012.

== Format ==
Each episode surrounds the production company, Go, who despite its lack of hit stars, has still managed to survive with its solid movies. The owner of the company, Go Hyun-jung, seeks to recruit new stars to her company through auditions each week for certain movies. Celebrities are brought to the audition by Kim Young-chul, and are met by the company's only star, Jung Hyung-don, and manager, Yoon Jong-shin. Celebrities attempt to be cast for the week's movie by showing their skills to match with the movie's theme.

== List of episodes ==
Episode #	Original Airdate	Movie Title	Guests
1	April 6, 2012	The Golden Age of Bad Men	Chun Jung-myung, Gil, Zo In-sung
2	April 13, 2012	Fallen Angels	Kim C, Kim Je-dong, Kim Soo-ro
3	April 20, 2012	Psychic	Big Bang
4	April 27, 2012	Gentlemen's Qualification	Boom, Ha-ha, Kim Jun-ho (comedian), Kim Jun-hyun
5	May 4, 2012	Gentlemen's Qualification	Boom, Ha-ha, Kim Jun-ho (comedian), Kim Jun-hyun
6	May 11, 2012	Big Brother is Back	Ahn Moon-suk, Kim Wan-sun, Park Hae-mi
7	May 18, 2012	Incarnation of Desire	Jo Yeo-jeong, Kim Dong-wook, Kim Min-jun, Park Chul-min
8	May 25, 2012	Miracle's Voice	Baek Ji-young, Ivy, Kim Bum-soo, Park Jung-hyun
9	June 1, 2012	Miracle's Voice	Baek Ji-young, Ivy, Kim Bum-soo, Park Jung-hyun
10	June 8, 2012	Genius of the Generation	Hwang Kwang-hee, Kim Jong-min, Lee Joon, Yoon Do-hyun
11	June 15, 2012	King of Sensibility	Jo Kwon, Kim Eung-su, Lee Jong-hyuk, Lee Kyung-shil
12	June 22, 2012	King of Sensibility	Jo Kwon, Kim Eung-su, Lee Jong-hyuk, Lee Kyung-shil
12	June 22, 2012	You're Handsome	Lee Moon-sik, Sung Dong-il, Yoo Hae-jin
13	June 29, 2012	You're Handsome	Lee Moon-sik, Sung Dong-il, Yoo Hae-jin
14	July 6, 2012	Bold Man	Hwang Jung-min, Ji Suk-jin, Kim Tae-won
15	July 13, 2012	Splendid Singles	Choi Hwa-jung, Youn Yuh-jung
16	July 19, 2012	Law of Survival (1)	Kim Byung-man, Noh Woo-jin, Park Si-eun, Ricky Kim, Ryu Dam
17	July 27, 2012	Law of Survival (2)	Kim Byung-man, Noh Woo-jin, Park Si-eun, Ricky Kim, Ryu Dam
17	July 27, 2012	Showtime	Kolleen Park, Psy
18	August 17, 2012	Experts of Reversals	Cho Jun-ho, Choi Byung-chul, Kim Jae-bum, Kim Jang-mi, Kim Ji-yeon, Shin Ah-ram, Song Dae-nam, Yang Hak-seon
19	August 24, 2012	Women By Nature	Bobby Kim, Lee Hong-ki, Yim Jae-beom
20	August 31, 2012	Adventurer	Choi Daniel, Kim Jung-nan, Im Chang-jung
21	September 7, 2012	Splash To Live	G.O, Jung Eun-ji, Lee Jong-hyun, Seo In-guk, Song Dae-kwan, Tae Jin-ah
22	September 14, 2012	Sorry I Don't Have Discretion	Lee Yoon-suk, Lee Wae-su, Tiger JK
23	September 21, 2012	You've Gone Too Far	Ji Sang-ryeol, Lee Sung-mi, Noh Sa-yeon, Park Ki-woong
24	September 28, 2012	Odd People Hurray	Jung Gyu-woon, Jang Yun-jeong, Park So-hyun, Song Eun-ee
25	October 5, 2012	By Instinct	Park Jung-chul, Jeong Jinwoon, Noh Woo-jin, Shin Bong-sun, Go Woo-ri
26	October 12, 2012	By Instinct	Park Jung-chul, Jeong Jinwoon, Noh Woo-jin, Shin Bong-sun, Go Woo-ri
27	October 19, 2012	Master of Seduction	Jo Sung-ha, Lee Ki-young, Seo Young-hee
28	October 26, 2012	It's Alright To Lose Your Temper	Park Jin-hee, Yoon Hyung-bin, Choi Jung-yoon, Jo Jae-yoon
29	November 2, 2012	Dangerous Girl	Suzy, IU, Ga-in
30	November 9, 2012	King of Ending	Kim Won-jun, Kim Ji-young, Lee Jung-hyun, Kim Da-hyun
31	November 23, 2012	Miracle's Voice 2	BMK, Lee Soo-young, Kim Tae-woo, K.Will, Yesung
32	November 30, 2012	Adolescence	Lee Seung-hwan, Yoon Sang, Younha
33	December 7, 2012	Strong People You Can't Find Anywhere in the World	Jo Hye-ryun, Jung Ju-ri, Kim Jae-kyung, Hwang Kwang-hee
34	December 14, 2012	Scent of Masculinity	CN Blue
35	December 21, 2012	Excitement Show	Jeon Hyun-mu, Hyun Young, Park Eun-ji, Boom
