= Yoo Seung-ok =

South Korean model (born 1990)

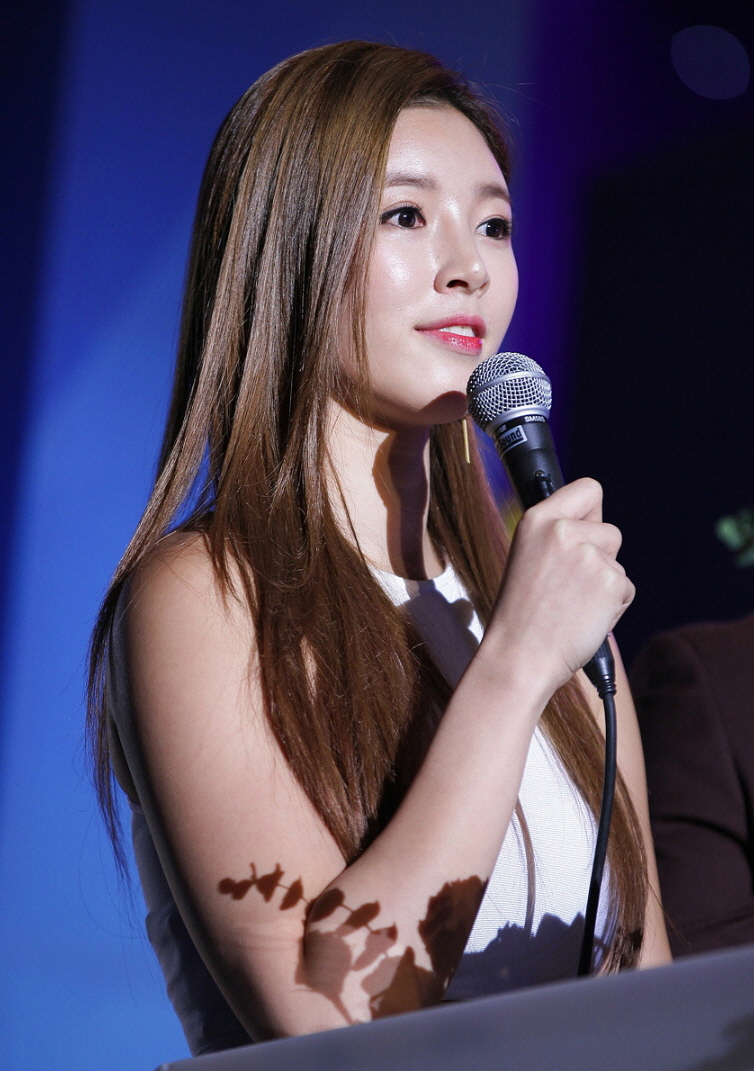
- Yoo in 2015
- Born: June 21, 1990 (age 36); Cheongwon County
- Occupations: grid girl, spokesperson, actress
- Years active: 2013-

Yoo Seung-ok (born June 21, 1990) is a South Korean model.

After winning the special prize at Miss Korea 2013, she worked as a booth babe at the 2013 Seoul Motor Show. In November 2014, she became the first Asian woman to reach the top five at Muscle Mania, held in Las Vegas. In 2017, she donated a portion of her earnings from her modelling and her cinematic appearances to the "Yoo Seung-ok Kindergarten" in South Sudan.

== Education ==
- 2009 – 2013 Kongju National University

== Career ==
In addition to her many modelling and acting roles, she was also the first South Korean UFC Octagon girl in 2015.

=== Films ===
- 2017: Fabricated City- Concealment (game character)
- 2017: Miss Butcher - Healthtime announcer
- 2018: Champion - Celebrity Role (guest star)

=== Dramas ===
- 2014 SBS Plus - Dodohara
- 2015 MBC - Sleepless Nights in Apgujeong - Eureka
- 2015 MBC - Queen's Flower -Yoga instructor
- 2015 SBS Plus web series -Girl Love Story
- 2015 O'live - Yumi's Room - guest star
- 2015 QTV - Heroes

=== Television ===
- 2015 SBS Amazing Star King contest
- 2015 MBC Rerrun of the Paradise Match
- 2015 KBS Happy Together
- 2015 OnStyle Body Salon
- 2015 Channel A Doctor Zhivago
- 2015 SBS Law of the Jungle
- 2015 Talk to You from Kim Je-dong - Don't worry!
- 2016 K STAR Live Star News - Secret news room
- 2017 tvN Society Game (Season 2)
- 2018 SBS Running Man

=== Music video ===
- 2015 Niel - Evil Woman

== Modelling career ==
- Toyota Venza model -2013 Seoul Automobile Show
- Cosmetic model- Beauty in Seoul 2013
- Music video iZui 2013
- 2014 Jeong Day- Figurerobics
- Kolon Run 2014 for your Favorite Top Model
- 2014 – 2nd place (Category: Models) at Muscle Mania Korea entrance competition
- 2014 - 5th place - Fitness America Weekend, Commercial model category
- 2015 - Cover girl, South Korean Maxim, April edition

== Awards ==
- 2013 -Special prize Miss Chungbuk Korea
