= Oh Jong-hyuk =

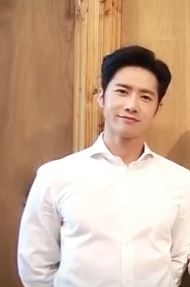
- Oh in 2019
- Born: February 16, 1983 (age 43); Susaek-dong, Eunpyeong District, Seoul, South Korea
- Occupations: Singer; actor
- Spouse: Park Hye-soo (m. 2021)
- Children: 1
- Musical career
- Genre: K-pop
- Label: Bless Ent
- Formerly of: Click-B
- Website: ohjonghyuk.dspmedia.co.kr

Korean name
- Hangul: 오종혁
- RR: O Jonghyeok
- MR: O Chonghyŏk

Oh Jong-hyuk (Korean: 오종혁; born February 16, 1983) is a South Korean singer and member of South Korean boy band Click-B.

== Personal life ==
Oh was educated at Dankook University High School, and graduated from Kyonggi University.

Oh began his mandatory military service in 2011. He served as an active duty officer after his six weeks of basic military training at the Pohang Marine Corps Training Center. He was discharged in 2013.

In September 2013, it was revealed that Oh had been dating T-ara member Soyeon for the past three years. After six years of dating, the relationship came to an end in 2016.

In April 2021, Oh announced that he would marry on April 12, 2021, to his non-celebrity girlfriend. As planned, Oh will get married from May 2020, which has to be postponed because of COVID-19. On December 2, 2021, Oh announced through his social media that his wife is pregnant. On July 7, 2022, his wife gave birth to their first child, a daughter.

== Career ==
In 1999, Oh debuted as a member of the group Click-B. He later debuted as a soloist in September 2006 with the album Issue under the stage name OJ.

Oh was a cast member in the variety show Law of the Jungle in 2013 and 2014, and appeared in MBC's King of Mask Singer in 2015, under the alias "Lonely Man Leon"

In August 2021, Oh signed with Bless Ent following the expiration of his contract with the former agency.

== Discography ==
=== Studio albums ===
- OJ Issue (2006)
- He's Story Vol. 2 'Cry' (2009)

=== EPs ===
- OK, I'm Ready (2008)
- Heartbreak (2009)

=== Singles ===
- "Love is Like That" (사랑이 그래요) (2007)
- "OJ" (2010)
- "Run to You, Fly with Cloud" (2011)
- "Time Is..." (시간은...) (2011)
- "Love Fades" (시들어) feat. Kim Ji-sook (2016)

== Filmography ==
=== Film ===
Year	Title	Role	Ref.
2016	Musudan	Yoo Cheol-hwan	
2017	Cheese in the Trap	Oh Young-gon	
2022	Wolves	Do Hoon	

=== Television series ===
Year	Title	Role	Ref.
2009	Enjoy Life	Hong Jin-soo	
2014-2015	Healer	Oh Gil-han	

=== Television shows ===
Year	Title	Notes	Ref.
2013	Law of the Jungle in Caribbean/Maya Jungle	Cast member, episode 71–80	
2013	Law of the Jungle in Micronesia	Cast member, episode 90–99	
2014	Law of the Jungle in Micronesia	Cast member, episode 90–99	
2014	Law of the Jungle in Borneo	Cast member, episode 100–107	
2014	Law of the Jungle in Brazil	Cast member, episode 108–116	
2014	Radio Star	Guest, episode 384	
2015	King of Mask Singer	Contestant as "Lonely Man Leon", episode 35–36	
2017	Law of the Jungle in Fiji	Cast member, episode 283–287	
2018	Law of the Jungle in Northern Mariana Islands	Cast member, episode 344–348	
2019	Law of the Jungle in Northern Mariana Islands	Cast member, episode 344–348	
2022	Steel Troop 2	Special MC	
2022	Steel Ball	Cast Member	

== Theater ==
Year	Title	Role	Ref.
2008	On Air Season 2	DJ Alex	
2009	On Air Season 2	DJ Alex	
2010	Thrill Me	Nathan	
2011	Audition	Park Byun-tae	
2013	The Days	Moo-young	
2013	Thrill Me	Nathan	
2013	The Wedding Singer	Robbie Hart	
2014	The Wedding Singer	Robbie Hart	
2014	Joint Security Area	Sergeant Soo-hyuk	
2014	Blood Brothers	Eddie	
2014	The Pride	Oliver	
2014	The Days	Moo-young	
2015	The Days	Moo-young	
2016	Poor People	Jang Deok-bae	
2016	Kill Me Now	Joy	
2016	Notre-Dame de Paris	Phoebus	
2016	The Days	Moo-young	
2016	Natasha, the White Donkey, and Me	Baek-seok	
2016	The Bunker Trilogy	Soldier #2	
2017	The Bunker Trilogy	Soldier #2	
2017	The Days	Moo-young	
2017	The Pride	Oliver	
2017	Tick, Tick... Boom!	Michael	
2017	Natasha, the White Donkey, and Me	Baek-seok	
2018	Natasha, the White Donkey, and Me	Baek-seok	
2018	A Man Who Stood	Man	
2018	The Last Empress	Hong Gye-hun	
2018	Infinite Power	Jang Seon-jae	
2018	Vampire Arthur	Arthur	
2018	The Days	Moo-young	
2018	The Bunker Trilogy	Soldier #2	
2019	The Bunker Trilogy	Soldier #2	
2019	Vampire Arthur	Arthur	
2019	The Days	Moo-young	
2020	Rent	Roger Davis	
2021	Press Guidelines	Joo-hyuk	
2022	Secretly, Greatly: THE LAST	Won Ryu-hwan	
2022	True West	Lee	
2022	Human Court	Ho Yun-pyo	
2022–2023	The Devotion of Suspect X	Yukawa	
2023	Secretly, Greatly: The Last	Won Ryu-hwan	
2023	Dream High	Kang Oh-hyeok	
2023	Sherlock Holmes: The Secret of the Andersons	Sherlock Holmes	
