= Law of the Jungle (TV program) =

South Korean reality-documentary show

- Genre: Reality show, Documentary
- Directed by: Multi-directors
- Narrated by: Yoon Do-hyun
- Opening theme: Guns N' Roses – "Welcome to the Jungle"
- Ending theme: Chanyeol –Last Hunter
- Country of origin: South Korea
- Original language: Korean
- No. of episodes: 452 (list of episodes)

Production
- Producer: Lee Ji-won
- Production location: Multiple countries
- Running time: 60 minutes

Original release
- Network: SBS
- Release: October 21, 2011 – May 29, 2021

Related
- Good Sunday

Law of the Jungle (Korean: 정글의 법칙; Hanja: 정글의 法則; RR: Jeonggeurui beopchik) is a South Korean reality-documentary show that airs on SBS. Each episode features celebrities sent to survive in remote locations around the world. The show was first aired on October 21, 2011. The show's 300th episode aired in 2018.

== History ==
South Korean comedian Kim Byung-man created the Kim Byung-man's Law of the Jungle (Korean: 김병만의 정글의 법칙) in 2011. On the show, celebrities, including actors and K-pop artists, join him in remote locations around the world to experience living in the wild. In each location, the guests are tasked to hunt, prepare meals, and create shelter for the group. Kim is the show's only regular cast member.

Kim did not appear on the show's 2017 episodes in Fiji after he suffered a spinal fracture while skydiving in the United States. He returned to the show for the following season in the Cook Islands.

The show first aired on Fridays at 11:05 pm KST on broadcast network SBS. On May 6, 2012, the show moved to Sundays at 5:00 pm. The show returned to Fridays on November 16, 2012, airing at 10:00 pm. The show moved to Saturday at 9:00 pm and shrank to 60 minutes starting from February 16, 2019.

Special editions of the show air occasionally. Law of the Jungle W features an all-female cast and generally airs during the Seollal and Chuseok holidays. Law of the Jungle K featured celebrities with their children, and aired as a Korean New Year special in 2013.

On May 26, 2020, SBS confirmed that the show would go on a hiatus due to the COVID-19 pandemic, which made travelling to foreign countries for filming of the show impossible.

The program rebooted on August 29, 2020, with the first domestic filming in the history, called "Law of the Jungle in Wild Korea".

== Special editions ==
Law of the Jungle special editions generally aired during the Seollal and Chuseok holidays. It may be Law of the Jungle W (W for Women, features an all-female cast, except in the 4-Part Special), or Law of the Jungle K (K for Kids, features celebrities with their children), or another theme.

Year	Edition	Theme	Location	Air date
2012	Seollal Special	Law of the Jungle W	Palawan Island, Philippines, Southeast Asia	January 22, 2012
2012	Seollal Special	Members: Kim Joo-hee, Kim Na-young, Jeon Hye-bin, Jung Joo-ri, Hong Soo-ah; Notes: This edition aired on episode 12.		
2012	Chuseok Special	Law of the Jungle W	Malakula Island, Vanuatu, Oceania	October 1, 2012
2012	Chuseok Special	Members: Han Go-eun, Shin Bong-sun, Jang Shin-young, Jung Joo-ri, Go Woo-ri (Rainbow)		
2012	4-Part Special	Law of the Jungle W	New Guinea, Papua New Guinea, Oceania	November 23, 2012 – December 21, 2012
2012	4-Part Special	Members: Park Sang-myun, Jo Hye-ryun, Lee Soo-kyung, Jo An, Jung Joo-ri, Kim Jae-kyung (Rainbow)		
2013	Seollal Special	Law of the Jungle K	Mindoro Island, Philippines, Southeast Asia	February 11, 2013
2013	Seollal Special	Narrator: Kim Gook-jin; Members: Park Nam-jung with daughters (Park Si-eun and Park Si-woo), Lee Jeong-yong with sons (Lee Mid-eum, Lee Ma-eum), Jo Hye-ryun with son (Kim Woo-joo), Yeom Kyung-hwan with son (Yeom Eun-ryul), Jung Jong-cheol with son (Jung Si-hoo)		
2016	Chuseok Special	Law of the Jungle – 48 Hours with Kim Sang-joong	Fiji, South Pacific Ocean	September 15, 2016
2016	Chuseok Special	Narrator: Yoon Do-hyun; Members: Kim Sang-joong, Kim Byung-man		
2019	Chuseok Special	Law of the Jungle with Family	Inle Lake, Myanmar, Southeast Asia	September 14, 2019
2019	Chuseok Special	Narrator: Yoon Do-hyun; Members: Kim Byung-man, Sean (Jinusean), Noh Woo-jin, Dong Hyun Kim, Hong Soo-ah, Moon Sung-min, Hongseok (Pentagon), BM (Kard), Saebom (Nature); Notes: This edition aired on episode 381.		

== Ratings ==
In the ratings below, the highest rating for each year will be in red, and the lowest rating for each year will be in blue.

=== 2011 ===
List of ratings in 2011 (Episodes 1 – 9)

Episode #	Original Airdate	Edition	TNmS Ratings		AGB Ratings	
Episode #	Original Airdate	Edition	Nationwide	Seoul Capital Area	Nationwide	Seoul Capital Area
1	October 21, 2011	in Namibia Ep.1	7.1%	9.3%	8.4%	10.5%
2	October 28, 2011	in Namibia Ep.2	7.0%	8.9%	7.9%	9.5%
3	November 4, 2011	in Namibia Ep.3	9.3%	12.0%	10.2%	12.1%
4	November 18, 2011	in Namibia Ep.4	11.2%	14.8%	11.8%	13.8%
5	November 25, 2011	in Namibia Ep.5	13.7%	16.7%	15.4%	17.4%
6	December 2, 2011	in Namibia Last Ep.	10.7%	14.6%	12.0%	14.9%
7	December 9, 2011	in Papua Ep.1	12.4%	16.8%	13.4%	15.6%
8	December 16, 2011	in Papua Ep.2	12.9%	16.5%	15.0%	18.4%
9	December 23, 2011	in Papua Ep.3	12.3%	15.1%	12.9%	14.5%

=== 2012 ===
List of ratings in 2012 (Episodes 10 – 41)

Episode #	Original Airdate	Edition	TNmS Ratings		AGB Ratings	
Episode #	Original Airdate	Edition	Nationwide	Seoul Capital Area	Nationwide	Seoul Capital Area
10	January 6, 2012	in Papua Ep.4	12.8%	16.2%	12.9%	15.1%
11	January 13, 2012	in Papua Last Ep.	15.3%	18.7%	16.7%	19.6%
12	January 22, 2012	Seollal Special - Behind Story	7.5%	9.1%	9.0%	10.4%
13	May 6, 2012	in Vanuatu Ep.1	12.8%	14.6%	13.3%	15.2%
14	May 13, 2012	in Vanuatu Ep.2	14.5%	16.1%	14.9%	15.9%
15	May 20, 2012	in Vanuatu Ep.3	17.1%	19.0%	16.8%	18.6%
16	May 27, 2012	in Vanuatu Ep.4	14.2%	17.2%	15.0%	16.4%
17	June 3, 2012	in Vanuatu Ep.5	16.9%	21.0%	16.6%	18.2%
18	June 10, 2012	in Vanuatu Ep.6	16.6%	18.3%	15.9%	17.8%
19	June 17, 2012	in Vanuatu Ep.6	14.9%	17.2%	15.5%	16.7%
20	June 24, 2012	in Vanuatu Ep.8	17.4%	20.9%	15.3%	16.8%
21	July 1, 2012	in Vanuatu Ep.9	15.6%	18.5%	15.8%	17.3%
22	July 8, 2012	in Vanuatu Last Ep.	18.4%	21.6%	17.6%	18.6%
23	July 15, 2012	in Siberia Ep.1	19.7%	22.8%	18.6%	20.4%
24	July 22, 2012	in Siberia Ep.2	18.7%	21.5%	17.2%	18.6%
25	August 5, 2012	in Siberia Ep.3	14.6%	15.9%	14.1%	15.5%
26	August 12, 2012	in Siberia Ep.4	17.7%	20.5%	16.2%	17.4%
27	August 19, 2012	in Siberia Ep.5	18.9%	22.7%	17.2%	18.9%
28	August 26, 2012	in Siberia Last Ep.	16.4%	19.6%	14.2%	15.9%
29	September 2, 2012	in Madagascar Ep.1	17.0%	19.5%	16.8%	18.1%
30	September 9, 2012	in Madagascar Ep.2	16.0%	18.8%	16.2%	17.8%
31	September 16, 2012	in Madagascar Ep.3	16.3%	19.6%	16.7%	17.9%
32	September 23, 2012	in Madagascar Ep.4	15.4%	17.1%	15.3%	16.4%
33	September 30, 2012	in Madagascar Ep.5	15.5%	16.0%	14.1%	15.9%
34	October 7, 2012	in Madagascar Ep.6	15.9%	17.1%	14.8%	16.1%
35	October 14, 2012	in Madagascar Ep.7	19.6%	22.0%	18.9%	20.3%
36	October 21, 2012	in Madagascar Ep.8	17.6%	19.3%	16.5%	17.5%
37	October 28, 2012	in Madagascar Ep.9	17.3%	19.6%	15.9%	17.7%
38	November 4, 2012	in Madagascar Ep.10	18.6%	20.5%	16.9%	18.1%
39	November 11, 2012	in Madagascar Ep.11	18.5%	20.1%	16.1%	17.8%
40	November 16, 2012	in Madagascar Last Ep.	14.0%	17.8%	12.7%	15.5%
41	December 28, 2012	in Amazon Ep.1	14.5%	15.8%	15.1%	16.4%

=== 2013 ===
List of ratings in 2013 (Episodes 42 – 91)

Episode #	Original Airdate	Edition	TNmS Ratings		AGB Ratings	
Episode #	Original Airdate	Edition	Nationwide	Seoul Capital Area	Nationwide	Seoul Capital Area
42	January 4, 2013	in Amazon Ep.2	17.8%	21.3%	17.1%	20.2%
43	January 11, 2013	in Amazon Ep.3	17.6%	20.7%	17.0%	18.2%
44	January 18, 2013	in Amazon Ep.4	19.7%	23.4%	17.4%	19.8%
45	January 25, 2013	in Amazon Ep.5	20.6%	24.6%	19.3%	21.7%
46	February 1, 2013	in Amazon Ep.6	19.9%	22.6%	18.4%	20.4%
47	February 8, 2013	in Amazon Ep.7	19.0%	21.2%	18.1%	19.6%
48	February 15, 2013	in Galapagos Ep.1	17.1%	19.9%	15.3%	16.5%
49	February 22, 2013	in Galapagos Ep.2	18.0%	20.8%	16.8%	18.9%
50	March 1, 2013	in Galapagos Ep.3 (Amazon Last Ep.)	16.8%	18.1%	15.2%	17.6%
51	March 8, 2013	in New Zealand Ep.1	17.4%	20.7%	16.4%	18.4%
52	March 15, 2013	in New Zealand Ep.2	16.8%	20.6%	15.6%	17.6%
53	March 22, 2013	in New Zealand Ep.3	16.5%	18.7%	16.8%	18.9%
54	March 29, 2013	in New Zealand Ep.4	17.1%	20.2%	15.7%	17.3%
55	April 5, 2013	in New Zealand Ep.5	17.0%	20.3%	16.2%	18.4%
56	April 12, 2013	in New Zealand Ep.6	15.5%	18.3%	15.8%	18.3%
57	April 19, 2013	in New Zealand Ep.7	15.8%	17.9%	14.1%	15.7%
58	April 26, 2013	in New Zealand Ep.8	14.6%	17.4%	15.3%	16.3%
59	May 3, 2013	in New Zealand Ep.9	16.1%	19.4%	15.8%	16.5%
60	May 10, 2013	in New Zealand Last Ep.	14.6%	16.8%	15.4%	16.4%
61	May 17, 2013	in Himalayas Ep.1	13.7%	15.9%	15.8%	17.0%
62	May 24, 2013	in Himalayas Ep.2	15.1%	16.7%	16.1%	17.9%
63	May 31, 2013	in Himalayas Ep.3	15.0%	17.4%	16.5%	17.6%
64	June 7, 2013	in Himalayas Ep.4	13.4%	15.6%	14.9%	17.0%
65	June 14, 2013	in Himalayas Ep.5	14.8%	17.0%	14.7%	17.0%
66	June 21, 2013	in Himalayas Ep.6	15.0%	17.0%	14.4%	14.6%
67	June 28, 2013	in Himalayas Ep.7	15.0%	17.5%	14.5%	16.2%
68	July 5, 2013	in Himalayas Ep.8	15.2%	18.3%	14.3%	15.6%
69	July 12, 2013	in Himalayas Ep.9	15.2%	18.4%	14.5%	16.2%
70	July 19, 2013	in Himalayas Last Ep.	14.0%	16.2%	13.9%	15.7%
71	July 26, 2013	in Caribbean Ep.1	15.3%	17.3%	14.2%	14.7%
72	August 2, 2013	in Caribbean Ep.2	18.2%	21.9%	15.7%	17.3%
73	August 9, 2013	in Caribbean Ep.3	18.8%	23.1%	17.3%	19.8%
74	August 16, 2013	in Caribbean Ep.4	17.3%	21.3%	16.5%	18.4%
75	August 23, 2013	in Caribbean Ep.5	16.1%	18.6%	15.5%	16.1%
76	August 30, 2013	in Caribbean Ep.6	16.1%	18.5%	13.8%	14.9%
77	September 6, 2013	in Maya Jungle Ep.1	14.4%	16.3%	14.3%	15.2%
78	September 13, 2013	in Maya Jungle Ep.2	14.4%	17.2%	15.6%	17.7%
79	September 20, 2013	in Maya Jungle Ep.3	13.6%	15.5%	11.1%	11.7%
80	September 27, 2013	in Maya Jungle Ep.4 (Caribbean Last Ep.)	12.9%	15.5%	13.2%	14.3%
81	October 4, 2013	in Savanna Ep.1	12.9%	16.0%	12.7%	13.4%
82	October 11, 2013	in Savanna Ep.2	14.6%	17.3%	14.2%	15.4%
83	October 18, 2013	in Savanna Ep.3	14.9%	18.4%	14.4%	15.6%
84	November 1, 2013	in Savanna Ep.4	14.6%	18.4%	14.3%	15.2%
85	November 8, 2013	in Savanna Ep.5	13.3%	16.5%	13.7%	14.8%
86	November 15, 2013	in Savanna Ep.6	13.1%	16.0%	14.8%	16.5%
87	November 29, 2013	in Savanna Ep.7	11.4%	14.2%	10.3%	11.0%
88	December 6, 2013	in Savanna Ep.8	10.5%	12.8%	10.4%	11.6%
89	December 13, 2013	in Savanna Last Ep.	10.7%	12.6%	10.7%	11.8%
90	December 20, 2013	in Micronesia Ep.1	12.5%	14.5%	12.4%	13.4%
91	December 27, 2013	in Micronesia Ep.2	13.3%	15.4%	14.4%	15.4%

=== 2014 ===
List of ratings in 2014 (Episodes 92 – 141)

Episode #	Original Airdate	Edition	TNmS Ratings		AGB Ratings	
Episode #	Original Airdate	Edition	Nationwide	Seoul Capital Area	Nationwide	Seoul Capital Area
92	January 3, 2014	in Micronesia Ep.3	13.5%	16.1%	15.6%	17.5%
93	January 10, 2014	in Micronesia Ep.4	13.2%	16.2%	16.0%	17.6%
94	January 17, 2014	in Micronesia Ep.5	13.7%	16.6%	12.0%	13.2%
95	January 24, 2014	in Micronesia Ep.6	17.1%	20.8%	15.6%	16.5%
96	January 31, 2014	in Micronesia Ep.7	9.6%	11.9%	9.0%	9.2%
97	February 7, 2014	in Micronesia Ep.8	16.6%	20.0%	15.9%	17.4%
98	February 14, 2014	in Micronesia Ep.9	16.3%	19.1%	14.4%	15.7%
99	February 21, 2014	in Micronesia Last Ep.	15.3%	18.8%	16.3%	17.7%
100	February 28, 2014	in Borneo Ep.1	13.9%	15.5%	16.4%	17.7%
101	March 7, 2014	in Borneo Ep.2	13.9%	16.2%	14.8%	16.3%
102	March 14, 2014	in Borneo Ep.3	13.9%	16.0%	14.7%	15.6%
103	March 21, 2014	in Borneo Ep.4	14.6%	16.3%	14.1%	15.3%
104	March 28, 2014	in Borneo Ep.5	13.1%	14.7%	13.1%	13.3%
105	April 4, 2014	in Borneo Ep.6	14.4%	17.4%	14.0%	15.4%
106	April 11, 2014	in Borneo Ep.7	13.0%	14.7%	12.8%	14.1%
107	May 2, 2014	in Borneo Last Ep.	11.2%	14.0%	11.6%	12.8%
108	May 9, 2014	in Brazil Ep.1	12.6%	15.1%	12.1%	13.6%
109	May 16, 2014	in Brazil Ep.2	13.0%	15.2%	12.2%	13.3%
110	May 23, 2014	in Brazil Ep.3	14.7%	18.1%	13.1%	13.6%
111	May 30, 2014	in Brazil Ep.4	13.0%	15.4%	12.4%	13.3%
112	June 6, 2014	in Brazil Ep.5	12.0%	14.7%	10.8%	11.2%
113	June 13, 2014	in Brazil Ep.6	12.9%	15.7%	11.7%	12.3%
114	June 20, 2014	in Brazil Ep.7	13.8%	16.0%	11.7%	12.6%
115	June 27, 2014	in Brazil Ep.8	11.8%	13.5%	11.3%	12.3%
116	July 4, 2014	in Brazil Last Ep.	12.2%	13.9%	11.4%	11.8%
117	July 11, 2014	in Reunion Island Ep.1	13.3%	16.0%	13.2%	14.4%
118	July 18, 2014	in Reunion Island Ep.2	13.7%	16.2%	13.2%	14.7%
119	July 25, 2014	in Reunion Island Ep.3	13.9%	16.7%	12.7%	14.2%
120	August 1, 2014	in Reunion Island Ep.4	12.6%	14.5%	11.4%	11.7%
121	August 8, 2014	in Reunion Island Ep.5	13.7%	16.5%	12.1%	13.3%
122	August 15, 2014	in Reunion Island Ep.6	13.0%	13.6%	12.0%	13.3%
123	August 22, 2014	in Reunion Island Ep.7	12.8%	14.7%	12.5%	13.3%
124	August 29, 2014	in Reunion Island Ep.8	13.1%	15.6%	13.2%	14.3%
125	September 5, 2014	in Reunion Island Last Ep.	13.4%	15.5%	12.8%	13.3%
126	September 12, 2014	in Solomon Islands Ep.1	12.7%	15.7%	14.0%	15.4%
127	September 19, 2014	in Solomon Islands Ep.2	10.8%	13.0%	12.1%	13.7%
128	September 26, 2014	in Solomon Islands Ep.3	13.5%	15.9%	14.4%	15.2%
129	October 3, 2014	in Solomon Islands Ep.4	11.5%	13.2%	13.9%	15.2%
130	October 10, 2014	in Solomon Islands Ep.5	13.2%	15.9%	13.4%	14.5%
131	October 17, 2014	in Solomon Islands Ep.6	13.9%	15.2%	13.6%	15.2%
132	October 24, 2014	in Solomon Islands Ep.7	13.1%	14.6%	13.2%	14.7%
133	October 31, 2014	in Solomon Islands Ep.8	11.6%	14.1%	12.5%	13.3%
134	November 7, 2014	in Solomon Islands Ep.9	13.4%	15.9%	13.4%	14.2%
135	November 14, 2014	in Solomon Islands Ep.10	13.9%	15.2%	13.2%	14.5%
136	November 21, 2014	in Solomon Islands Last Ep.	12.8%	15.3%	13.5%	14.3%
137	November 28, 2014	in Costa Rica Ep.1	11.5%	14.1%	12.8%	13.9%
138	December 5, 2014	in Costa Rica Ep.2	12.0%	14.5%	13.1%	14.4%
139	December 12, 2014	in Costa Rica Ep.3	11.5%	14.0%	13.1%	14.5%
140	December 19, 2014	in Costa Rica Ep.4	12.6%	15.6%	12.6%	13.7%
141	December 26, 2014	in Costa Rica Ep.5	13.0%	15.8%	15.0%	16.5%

=== 2015 ===
List of ratings in 2015 (Episodes 142 – 193)

Episode #	Original Airdate	Edition	TNmS Ratings		AGB Ratings	
Episode #	Original Airdate	Edition	Nationwide	Seoul Capital Area	Nationwide	Seoul Capital Area
142	January 2, 2015	in Costa Rica Ep.6	14.5%	18.1%	15.6%	17.5%
143	January 9, 2015	in Costa Rica Ep.7	14.7%	17.7%	14.7%	16.3%
144	January 16, 2015	in Costa Rica Ep.8	14.9%	18.3%	15.5%	18.3%
145	January 23, 2015	in Costa Rica Last Ep.	12.9%	15.5%	12.7%	14.6%
146	January 30, 2015	in Palau Ep.1	13.8%	17.0%	15.7%	17.4%
147	February 6, 2015	in Palau Ep.2	13.0%	15.2%	13.8%	15.5%
148	February 13, 2015	in Palau Ep.3	13.4%	15.7%	12.7%	14.3%
149	February 20, 2015	in Palau Ep.4	10.3%	11.5%	11,8%	13,5%
150	February 27, 2015	in Palau Ep.5	12.3%	14.7%	13.7%	16.0%
151	March 6, 2015	in Palau Ep.6	12.5%	14.1%	13.8%	15.6%
152	March 13, 2015	in Palau Ep.7	11.9%	14.1%	12.5%	13.9%
153	March 20, 2015	in Palau Last Ep.	12.9%	15.8%	13.8%	15.5%
154	March 27, 2015	in Indochina Ep.1	13.4%	15.6%	13.2%	14.8%
155	April 3, 2015	in Indochina Ep.2	13.3%	15.0%	14.1%	15.6%
156	April 10, 2015	in Indochina Ep.3	12.4%	15.2%	12.3%	14.3%
157	April 17, 2015	in Indochina Ep.4	12.6%	15.1%	11.9%	13.3%
158	April 24, 2015	in Indochina Ep.5	12.2%	14.4%	12.9%	14.6%
159	May 1, 2015	in Indochina Ep.6	12.7%	15.4%	12.5%	14.0%
160	May 8, 2015	in Indochina Ep.7	12.6%	15.7%	11.9%	12.8%
161	May 15, 2015	in Indochina Ep.8	10.4%	12.1%	11.0%	11.9%
162	May 22, 2015	in Indochina Last Ep.	10.3%	12.4%	10.3%	11.5%
163	May 29, 2015	in Yap Ep.1	10.8%	12.6%	11.5%	12.6%
164	June 5, 2015	in Yap Ep.2	10.6%	13.2%	11.8%	12.7%
165	June 12, 2015	in Yap Ep.3	11.4%	13,2%	11.0%	12.0%
166	June 19, 2015	in Yap Ep.4	10.4%	11.6%	11.0%	12.2%
167	June 26, 2015	in Yap Ep.5	11.5%	12.7%	11.9%	13.2%
168	July 3, 2015	in Yap Ep.6	12.9%	14.7%	11.2%	11.7%
165	July 10, 2015	in Yap Ep.7	11.3%	13.2%	11.8%	13.2%
170	July 17, 2015	in Yap Last Ep.	12.1%	13.6%	12.0%	12.5%
171	July 24, 2015	Hidden Kingdom Ep.1	11.0%	12.6%	11.6%	12.3%
172	July 31, 2015	Hidden Kingdom Ep.2	10.7%	12.4%	10.1%	11.1%
173	August 7, 2015	Hidden Kingdom Ep.3	10.6%	11.7%	11.1%	12.8%
174	August 14, 2015	Hidden Kingdom Ep.4	11.9%	13.1%	12.4%	13.4%
175	August 21, 2015	Hidden Kingdom Ep.5 (The Last Hunter)	10.6%	11.8%	12.4%	14.5%
176	August 28, 2015	Hidden Kingdom Ep.6 (The Last Hunter)	12.8%	14.0%	13.3%	14.5%
177	September 4, 2015	Hidden Kingdom Last Ep. (The Last Hunter)	12.9%	14.3%	13.0%	14.1%
178	September 11, 2015	in Nicaragua Ep.1	10.8%	12.0%	11.5%	13.1%
179	September 18, 2015	in Nicaragua Ep.2	12.3%	13.8%	13.1%	14.3%
180	September 25, 2015	in Nicaragua Ep.3	12.3%	13.3%	13.5%	14.5%
181	October 2, 2015	in Nicaragua Ep.4	12.6%	13.8%	13.7%	15.3%
182	October 9, 2015	in Nicaragua Ep.5	10.1%	11.5%	10.8%	12.0%
183	October 16, 2015	in Nicaragua Ep.6	9.8%	10.8%	11.7%	13.5%
184	October 23, 2015	in Nicaragua Ep.7 (4th anniversary)	9.6%	11.5%	10.9%	12.1%
185	October 30, 2015	in Nicaragua Last Ep. (4th anniversary)	9.9%	11.2%	11.7%	13.2%
186	November 6, 2015	in Samoa Ep.1	9.6%	10.9%	11.6%	12.9%
187	November 13, 2015	in Samoa Ep.2	9.1%	9.7%	12.0%	13.7%
188	November 20, 2015	in Samoa Ep.3	9.1%	10.2%	11.1%	12.7%
189	November 27, 2015	in Samoa Ep.4	9.4%	10.5%	11.6%	13.1%
190	December 4, 2015	in Samoa Ep.5	10.3%	11.0%	10.9%	12.8%
191	December 11, 2015	in Samoa Ep.6	10.3%	10.1%	11.8%	13.0%
192	December 18, 2015	in Samoa Ep.7	11.7%	13.2%	13.9%	16.2%
193	December 25, 2015	in Samoa Ep.8	10.0%	11.2%	12.6%	14.0%

=== 2016 ===
List of ratings in 2016 (Episodes 194 – 246)

Episode #	Original Airdate	Edition	TNmS Ratings		AGB Ratings	
Episode #	Original Airdate	Edition	Nationwide	Seoul Capital Area	Nationwide	Seoul Capital Area
194	January 1, 2016	in Samoa Last Ep.	9.7%	10.6%	11.4%	12.1%
195	January 8, 2016	in Panama Ep.1	12.3%	13.3%	13.5%	15.3%
196	January 15, 2016	in Panama Ep.2	12.5%	14.2%	12.6%	14.3%
197	January 22, 2016	in Panama Ep.3	13.5%	14.8%	15.1%	17.1%
198	January 29, 2016	in Panama Ep.4	13.0%	13.2%	13.9%	15.8%
199	February 5, 2016	in Panama Ep.5	11.9%	12.6%	13.1%	15.1%
200	February 12, 2016	in Panama Ep.6	13.1%	14.0%	14.4%	16.5%
201	February 19, 2016	in Panama Ep.7	12.1%	12.5%	12.6%	14.6%
202	February 26, 2016	in Panama Last Ep.	10.5%	11.4%	11.6%	12.8%
203	March 4, 2016	in Tonga Ep.1	12.6%	13.3%	13.5%	14.9%
204	March 11, 2016	in Tonga Ep.2	12.7%	13.9%	14.9%	16.8%
205	March 18, 2016	in Tonga Ep.3	12.6%	13.1%	14.7%	17.3%
206	March 25, 2016	in Tonga Ep.4	12.7%	13.9%	13.0%	14.2%
207	April 1, 2016	in Tonga Ep.5	11.6%	12.7%	13.6%	15.1%
208	April 8, 2016	in Tonga Ep.6	11.6%	13.1%	13.7%	15.0%
209	April 15, 2016	in Tonga Ep.7	12.0%	13.7%	12.8%	14.5%
210	April 22, 2016	in Tonga Ep.8	10.8%	10.5%	11.9%	13.9%
211	April 29, 2016	in Tonga Last Ep.	11.9%	13.6%	13.4%	15.8%
212	May 6, 2016	in Papua New Guinea Ep.1	11.6%	12.8%	12.8%	14.3%
213	May 13, 2016	in Papua New Guinea Ep.2	11.5%	12.4%	11.7%	13.1%
214	May 20, 2016	in Papua New Guinea Ep.3	11.9%	13.8%	12.5%	14.3%
215	May 27, 2016	in Papua New Guinea Ep.4	11.1%	12.5%	11.9%	13.5%
216	June 3, 2016	in Papua New Guinea Ep.5	11.8%	12.9%	12.8%	14.8%
217	June 10, 2016	in Papua New Guinea Ep.6	10.6%	12.5%	13.3%	15.1%
218	June 17, 2016	in Papua New Guinea Ep.7	11.2%	12.8%	12.1%	13.4%
219	June 24, 2016	in Papua New Guinea Last Ep.	11.9%	14.3%	13.7%	15.8%
220	July 1, 2016	in New Caledonia Ep.1	10.1%	11.3%	12.2%	14.4%
221	July 8, 2016	in New Caledonia Ep.2	11.7%	13.5%	12.2%	13.6%
222	July 15, 2016	in New Caledonia Ep.3	9.8%	11.1%	11.6%	13.1%
223	July 22, 2016	in New Caledonia Ep.4	10.8%	11.8%	11.8%	13.0%
224	July 29, 2016	in New Caledonia Ep.5	11.6%	12.6%	12.5%	14.6%
225	August 5, 2016	in New Caledonia Ep.6	10.3%	11.9%	10.7%	11.7%
226	August 12, 2016	in New Caledonia Ep.7	9.1%	9.5%	10.7%	12.0%
227	August 19, 2016	in New Caledonia Ep.8	9.1%	10.4%	9.5%	10.1%
228	August 26, 2016	in New Caledonia Last Ep.	11.0%	11.2%	13.1%	14.5%
229	September 2, 2016	in Mongolia Ep.1	10.2%	10.5%	12.3%	13.3%
230	September 9, 2016	in Mongolia Ep.2	10.0%	10.5%	11.4%	13.0%
231	September 16, 2016	in Mongolia Ep.3	10.1%	10.6%	10.7%	11.8%
232	September 23, 2016	in Mongolia Ep.4	12.0%	12.6%	14.0%	15.5%
233	September 30, 2016	in Mongolia Ep.5	13.1%	14.3%	14.3%	15.9%
234	October 7, 2016	in Mongolia Ep.6	15.2%	15.2%	15.3%	17.0%
235	October 14, 2016	in Mongolia Ep.7	10.3%	11.0%	11.6%	12.9%
236	October 21, 2016	in Mongolia Ep.8	11.3%	12.8%	11.5%	12.6%
237	October 28, 2016	in Mongolia Last Ep.	10.8%	11.0%	11.8%	13.5%
238	November 4, 2016	in East Timor Ep.1	10.3%	11.2%	10.4%	12.1%
239	November 11, 2016	in East Timor Ep.2	9.9%	10.0%	11.2%	12.7%
240	November 18, 2016	in East Timor Ep.3	11.0%	11.8%	11.4%	12.7%
241	November 25, 2016	in East Timor Ep.4	10.6%	11.3%	12.3%	13.4%
242	December 2, 2016	in East Timor Ep.5	9.0%	10.1%	10.3%	12.0%
243	December 9, 2016	in East Timor Ep.6	9.9%	11.7%	10.8%	11.3%
244	December 16, 2016	in East Timor Ep.7	11.1%	11.8%	12.5%	14.1%
245	December 23, 2016	in East Timor Ep.8	10.6%	11.2%	12.9%	14.4%
246	December 30, 2016	in East Timor Last Ep.	10.2%	11.5%	12.5%	13.9%

=== 2017 ===
List of ratings in 2017 (Episodes 247 – 297)

Episode #	Original Airdate	Edition	TNmS Ratings		AGB Ratings	
Episode #	Original Airdate	Edition	Nationwide	Seoul Capital Area	Nationwide	Seoul Capital Area
247	January 6, 2017	in Kota Manado Ep.1	13.1%	15.7%	14.6%	16.4%
248	January 13, 2017	in Kota Manado Ep.2	13.8%	15.5%	13.9%	15.3%
249	January 20, 2017	in Kota Manado Ep.3	13.3%	15.4%	14.8%	16.6%
250	January 27, 2017	in Kota Manado Ep.4	11.3%	12.4%	10.8%	11.9%
251	February 3, 2017	in Kota Manado Ep.5	13.0%	15.0%	14.5%	16.4%
252	February 10, 2017	in Kota Manado Ep.6	12.6%	12.3%	13.9%	15.1%
253	February 17, 2017	in Kota Manado Ep.7	12.1%	13.7%	13.9%	15.6%
254	February 24, 2017	in Kota Manado Ep.8	12.5%	13.3%	13.5%	15.3%
255	March 3, 2017	in Kota Manado Last Ep.	11.1%	11.9%	13.1%	14.1%
256	March 17, 2017	in Sumatra Ep.1	12.6%	15.0%	13.2%	14.9%
257	March 24, 2017	in Sumatra Ep.2	12.4%	13.4%	13.2%	14.2%
258	March 31, 2017	in Sumatra Ep.3	11.8%	13.4%	13.5%	14.9%
259	April 7, 2017	in Sumatra Ep.4	11.1%	12.0%	11.1%	12.1%
260	April 14, 2017	in Sumatra Ep.5	10.5%	11.4%	10.7%	11.4%
261	April 21, 2017	in Sumatra Ep.6	10.3%	10.9%	11.4%	12.8%
262	April 28, 2017	in Sumatra Ep.7	9.4%	10.9%	10.1%	11.0%
263	May 5, 2017	in Sumatra Ep.8	8.2%	8.2%	8.8%	9.5%
264	May 12, 2017	in Sumatra Last Ep.	9.4%	9.8%	10.1%	11.0%
265	May 19, 2017	in Wild New Zealand Ep.1	10.4%	10.9%	10.8%	11.4%
265	May 19, 2017	in Wild New Zealand Ep.1	12.2%	12.2%	13.1%	14.1%
266	May 26, 2017	in Wild New Zealand Ep.2	10.4%	11.0%	11.4%	12.8%
266	May 26, 2017	in Wild New Zealand Ep.2	13.7%	14.4%	14.9%	16.0%
267	June 2, 2017	in Wild New Zealand Ep.3	10.9%	12.8%	11.4%	13.0%
267	June 2, 2017	in Wild New Zealand Ep.3	13.3%	14.9%	15.7%	17.2%
268	June 9, 2017	in Wild New Zealand Ep.4	10.4%	11.9%	10.7%	11.1%
268	June 9, 2017	in Wild New Zealand Ep.4	13.2%	15.0%	14.2%	14.8%
269	June 16, 2017	in Wild New Zealand Ep.5	10.2%	11.0%	10.8%	11.7%
269	June 16, 2017	in Wild New Zealand Ep.5	11.7%	12.7%	13.9%	14.8%
270	June 23, 2017	in Wild New Zealand Ep.6	10.9%	11.1%	10.4%	10.6%
270	June 23, 2017	in Wild New Zealand Ep.6	14.0%	14.7%	15.6%	16.3%
271	June 30, 2017	in Wild New Zealand Ep.7	12.5%	13.2%	13.5%	14.0%
271	June 30, 2017	in Wild New Zealand Ep.7	15.1%	16.2%	16.1%	17.1%
272	July 7, 2017	in Wild New Zealand Ep.8	11.4%	11.4%	12.9%	13.6%
272	July 7, 2017	in Wild New Zealand Ep.8	13.2%	13.7%	16.4%	17.4%
273	July 14, 2017	in Wild New Zealand Last Ep.	10.8%	11.2%	13.3%	14.3%
273	July 14, 2017	in Wild New Zealand Last Ep.	13.2%	13.7%	16.0%	17.3%
274	July 21, 2017	in Komodo Ep.1	11.3%	12.2%	12.6%	13.6%
274	July 21, 2017	in Komodo Ep.1	13.8%	14.7%	15.8%	17.0%
275	July 28, 2017	in Komodo Ep.2	11.5%	12.3%	11.2%	12.8%
275	July 28, 2017	in Komodo Ep.2	14.4%	15.3%	15.3%	17.3%
276	August 4, 2017	in Komodo Ep.3	9.7%	10.7%	10.3%	11.7%
276	August 4, 2017	in Komodo Ep.3	11.7%	12.1%	12.2%	13.7%
277	August 11, 2017	in Komodo Ep.4	10.0%	10.2%	9.8%	10.9%
277	August 11, 2017	in Komodo Ep.4	11.6%	11.7%	12.1%	13.1%
278	August 18, 2017	in Komodo Ep.5	9.3%	9.7%	10.4%	12.2%
278	August 18, 2017	in Komodo Ep.5	10.4%	10.5%	11.6%	13.2%
279	August 25, 2017	in Komodo Ep.6	9.6%	10.3%	10.7%	11.5%
279	August 25, 2017	in Komodo Ep.6	11.7%	12.6%	12.4%	13.6%
280	September 1, 2017	in Komodo Ep.7	9.2%	8.8%	9.8%	10.9%
280	September 1, 2017	in Komodo Ep.7	11.6%	10.5%	12.9%	13.8%
281	September 8, 2017	in Komodo Ep.8	9.9%	11.2%	9.2%	10.2%
281	September 8, 2017	in Komodo Ep.8	11.3%	11.4%	11.4%	13.1%
282	September 15, 2017	in Komodo Last Ep.	9.4%	10.1%	10.3%	11.6%
282	September 15, 2017	in Komodo Last Ep.	10.6%	10.9%	12.7%	13.9%
283	September 22, 2017	in Fiji Ep.1	8.9%	10.1%	8.4%	9.4%
283	September 22, 2017	in Fiji Ep.1	10.2%	11.0%	11.0%	12.4%
284	September 29, 2017	in Fiji Ep.2	8.1%	7.8%	9.5%	10.3%
284	September 29, 2017	in Fiji Ep.2	9.4%	9.7%	11.2%	12.3%
285	October 6, 2017	in Fiji Ep.3	6.1%	6.3%	6.0%	6.2%
285	October 6, 2017	in Fiji Ep.3	6.7%	6.5%	7.7%	7.8%
286	October 13, 2017	in Fiji Ep.4	7.5%	8.0%	8.3%	9.0%
286	October 13, 2017	in Fiji Ep.4	9.5%	10.3%	10.1%	10.8%
287	October 20, 2017	in Fiji Ep.5	9.7%	10.3%	10.0%	10.5%
287	October 20, 2017	in Fiji Ep.5	11.8%	12.7%	11.7%	12.3%
288	October 27, 2017	in Fiji Ep.6 (in Gods' Garden Taveuni)	8.6%	9.3%	8.7%	8.9%
288	October 27, 2017	in Fiji Ep.6 (in Gods' Garden Taveuni)	11.1%	12.4%	12.1%	12.4%
289	November 3, 2017	in Fiji Ep.7 (in Gods' Garden Taveuni)	9.0%	10.2%	9.4%	10.1%
289	November 3, 2017	in Fiji Ep.7 (in Gods' Garden Taveuni)	11.3%	12.7%	12.7%	13.6%
290	November 10, 2017	in Fiji Ep.8 (in Gods' Garden Taveuni)	9.7%	10.5%	9.7%	10.5%
290	November 10, 2017	in Fiji Ep.8 (in Gods' Garden Taveuni)	11.8%	12.9%	13.0%	14.1%
291	November 17, 2017	in Fiji Ep.9 (in Gods' Garden Taveuni)	9.1%	10.3%	9.4%	9.9%
291	November 17, 2017	in Fiji Ep.9 (in Gods' Garden Taveuni)	11.5%	12.5%	13.1%	14.0%
292	November 24, 2017	in Fiji Last Ep. (in Gods' Garden Taveuni)	8.9%	10.4%	10.5%	11.1%
292	November 24, 2017	in Fiji Last Ep. (in Gods' Garden Taveuni)	10.7%	12.6%	12.8%	13.5%
293	December 1, 2017	in Cook Islands Ep.1	10.2%	11.3%	11.0%	12.6%
293	December 1, 2017	in Cook Islands Ep.1	12.4%	13.5%	13.8%	15.1%
294	December 8, 2017	in Cook Islands Ep.2	10.5%	11.1%	11.3%	12.0%
294	December 8, 2017	in Cook Islands Ep.2	12.5%	12.9%	14.4%	15.3%
295	December 15, 2017	in Cook Islands Ep.3	10.4%	11.0%	10.2%	11.0%
295	December 15, 2017	in Cook Islands Ep.3	14.7%	15.1%	13.8%	14.8%
296	December 22, 2017	in Cook Islands Ep.4	9.7%	10.4%	11.1%	11.7%
296	December 22, 2017	in Cook Islands Ep.4	11.6%	11.7%	13.8%	14.7%
297	December 29, 2017	in Cook Islands Ep.5	9.8%	10.0%	11.2%	12.3%
297	December 29, 2017	in Cook Islands Ep.5	11.0%	10.8%	11.8%	12.7%

=== 2018 ===
List of ratings in 2018 (Episodes 298 – 344)

Episode #	Original Airdate	Edition	TNmS Ratings		AGB Ratings	
Episode #	Original Airdate	Edition	Nationwide	Seoul Capital Area	Nationwide	Seoul Capital Area
298	January 5, 2018	in Cook Islands Ep.6	9.3%	10.7%	10.3%	10.8%
298	January 5, 2018	in Cook Islands Ep.6	11.4%	12.0%	13.1%	13.8%
299	January 12, 2018	in Cook Islands Ep.7	8.8%	9.9%	10.1%	11.1%
299	January 12, 2018	in Cook Islands Ep.7	11.0%	11.6%	12.7%	13.3%
300	January 19, 2018	in Cook Islands Ep.8	8.5%	8.8%	9.0%	9.3%
300	January 19, 2018	in Cook Islands Ep.8	10.6%	11.0%	11.6%	12.1%
301	January 26, 2018	in Cook Islands Last Ep.	10.5%	11.3%	9.5%	10.2%
301	January 26, 2018	in Cook Islands Last Ep.	12.5%	13.1%	12.5%	13.2%
302	February 2, 2018	in Patagonia Ep.1	10.0%	10.4%	9.8%	10.2%
302	February 2, 2018	in Patagonia Ep.1	12.3%	13.1%	13.0%	13.8%
303	February 9, 2018	in Patagonia Ep.2	9.1%	10.2%	10.9%	11.9%
303	February 9, 2018	in Patagonia Ep.2	9.6%	11.0%	10.9%	12.3%
304	February 16, 2018	in Patagonia Ep.3	7.5%	8.6%	8.3%	9.4%
304	February 16, 2018	in Patagonia Ep.3	13.0%	14.2%	13.6%	14.8%
305	March 2, 2018	in Patagonia Ep.4	9.4%	10.2%	8.7%	9.5%
305	March 2, 2018	in Patagonia Ep.4	11.0%	11.8%	11.9%	12.7%
306	March 9, 2018	in Patagonia Ep.5	8.2%	8.9%	8.8%	9.5%
306	March 9, 2018	in Patagonia Ep.5	11.0%	11.6%	11.4%	12.0%
307	March 16, 2018	in Patagonia Ep.6	10.2%	10.6%	9.7%	10.1%
307	March 16, 2018	in Patagonia Ep.6	11.7%	11.9%	11.8%	12.0%
308	March 23, 2018	in Patagonia Ep.7	11.3%	12.1%	10.6%	11.4%
308	March 23, 2018	in Patagonia Ep.7	12.3%	12.6%	12.7%	13.1%
309	March 30, 2018	in Patagonia Ep.8	9.6%	10.5%	10.0%	10.9%
309	March 30, 2018	in Patagonia Ep.8	12.4%	13.6%	12.8%	14.0%
310	April 6, 2018	in Patagonia Last Ep.	10.5%	11.8%	10.3%	11.6%
310	April 6, 2018	in Patagonia Last Ep.	12.3%	13.2%	12.7%	13.7%
311	April 13, 2018	in Antarctica Ep.1	11.0%	11.7%	11.5%	12.2%
311	April 13, 2018	in Antarctica Ep.1	13.7%	14.4%	15.0%	15.7%
312	April 20, 2018	in Antarctica Ep.2	10.6%	12.0%	10.5%	11.9%
312	April 20, 2018	in Antarctica Ep.2	11.1%	12.5%	12.3%	13.7%
313	May 4, 2018	in Antarctica Ep.3	8.5%	9.1%	8.9%	9.5%
313	May 4, 2018	in Antarctica Ep.3	9.2%	10.3%	10.8%	11.9%
314	May 11, 2018	in Antarctica Last Ep.	9.5%	10.6%	8.4%	9.5%
314	May 11, 2018	in Mexico Ep.0	10.4%	11.3%	9.9%	10.8%
315	May 18, 2018	in Mexico Ep.1	9.3%	10.0%	10.3%	11.1%
315	May 18, 2018	in Mexico Ep.1	11.4%	12.1%	12.7%	13.4%
316	May 25, 2018	in Mexico Ep.2	9.5%	9.6%	9.2%	9.3%
316	May 25, 2018	in Mexico Ep.2	11.1%	11.8%	12.0%	12.7%
317	June 1, 2018	in Mexico Ep.3	8.4%	9.2%	8.8%	9.6%
317	June 1, 2018	in Mexico Ep.3	10.9%	11.7%	12.8%	13.6%
318	June 8, 2018	in Mexico Ep.4	9.4%	10.1%	9.4%	10.2%
318	June 8, 2018	in Mexico Ep.4	12.1%	12.5%	12.8%	13.2%
319	June 15, 2018	in Mexico Ep.5	8.4%	8.7%	7.6%	7.9%
319	June 15, 2018	in Mexico Ep.5	10.7%	11.6%	10.8%	11.7%
320	June 22, 2018	in Mexico Ep.6	8.7%	9.5%	7.5%	8.3%
320	June 22, 2018	in Mexico Ep.6	12.1%	13.2%	11.8%	12.9%
321	June 29, 2018	in Mexico Ep.7	8.2%	8.4%	7.5%	7.7%
321	June 29, 2018	in Mexico Ep.7	11.7%	12.0%	10.9%	11.2%
322	July 6, 2018	in Mexico Ep.8	7.4%	8.5%	7.0%	8.1%
322	July 6, 2018	in Mexico Ep.8	12.4%	13.0%	11.7%	12.3%
323	July 13, 2018	in Mexico Ep.9	9.7%	10.3%	9.2%	9.8%
323	July 13, 2018	in Mexico Ep.9	10.9%	12.0%	12.0%	13.1%
324	July 20, 2018	in Mexico Last Ep.	10.2%	10.8%	8.7%	9.3%
324	July 20, 2018	in Mexico Last Ep.	11.4%	12.2%	10.5%	11.3%
325	July 27, 2018	in Sabah Ep.1	9.2%	9.4%	8.5%	8.8%
325	July 27, 2018	in Sabah Ep.1	11.1%	12.0%	10.9%	11.7%
326	August 3, 2018	in Sabah Ep.2	8.5%	8.9%	7.7%	8.1%
326	August 3, 2018	in Sabah Ep.2	10.4%	10.8%	9.5%	9.9%
327	August 10, 2018	in Sabah Ep.3	9.2%	9.6%	8.4%	8.8%
327	August 10, 2018	in Sabah Ep.3	12.0%	12.7%	11.4%	12.1%
328	August 17, 2018	in Sabah Ep.4	7.5%	7.9%	6.8%	7.2%
328	August 17, 2018	in Sabah Ep.4	10.9%	11.5%	10.1%	10.7%
329	August 24, 2018	in Sabah Ep.5	9.6%	10.1%	9.2%	9.7%
329	August 24, 2018	in Sabah Ep.5	10.7%	11.4%	10.3%	10.9%
330	August 31, 2018	in Sabah Ep.6	10.1%	10.2%	9.7%	9.8%
330	August 31, 2018	in Sabah Ep.6	13.0%	13.1%	12.6%	12.6%
331	September 7, 2018	in Sabah Ep.7	—	—	11.0%	11.8%
331	September 7, 2018	in Sabah Ep.7	—	—	13.3%	13.8%
332	September 14, 2018	in Sabah Ep.8	—	—	11.0%	12.3%
332	September 14, 2018	in Sabah Ep.8	—	—	12.3%	13.4%
333	September 21, 2018	in Sabah Last Ep.	—	—	9.5%	9.9%
333	September 21, 2018	in Sabah Last Ep.	—	—	12.1%	12.8%
334	September 28, 2018	in Last Indian Ocean Ep.1	9.3%	—	8.8%	9.3%
334	September 28, 2018	in Last Indian Ocean Ep.1	12.1%	—	12.2%	12.8%
335	October 5, 2018	in Last Indian Ocean Ep.2	—	—	9.2%	10.3%
335	October 5, 2018	in Last Indian Ocean Ep.2	—	—	12.8%	13.9%
336	October 12, 2018	in Last Indian Ocean Ep.3	—	—	9.5%	10.2%
336	October 12, 2018	in Last Indian Ocean Ep.3	—	—	11.8%	12.3%
337	October 19, 2018	in Last Indian Ocean Ep.4	—	—	9.4%	9.8%
337	October 19, 2018	in Last Indian Ocean Ep.4	—	—	12.8%	13.6%
338	October 26, 2018	in Last Indian Ocean Ep.5	—	—	9.5%	10.7%
338	October 26, 2018	in Last Indian Ocean Ep.5	—	—	12.2%	13.3%
339	November 9, 2018	in Last Indian Ocean Ep.6	—	—	8.2%	9.0%
339	November 9, 2018	in Last Indian Ocean Ep.6	—	—	8.7%	9.8%
340	November 16, 2018	in Last Indian Ocean Ep.7	—	—	8.9%	9.6%
340	November 16, 2018	in Last Indian Ocean Ep.7	—	—	12.0%	12.9%
341	November 30, 2018	in Last Indian Ocean Ep.8	—	—	9.0%	10.1%
341	November 30, 2018	in Last Indian Ocean Ep.8	—	—	11.9%	13.3%
342	December 7, 2018	in Last Indian Ocean Ep.9	—	—	9.8%	10.2%
342	December 7, 2018	in Last Indian Ocean Ep.9	—	—	11.6%	12.5%
343	December 14, 2018	in Last Indian Ocean Last Ep.	—	—	8.8%	9.5%
343	December 14, 2018	in Last Indian Ocean Last Ep.	—	—	11.0%	12.0%
344	December 21, 2018	in Northern Mariana Islands Ep.1	—	—	10.6%	11.7%
344	December 21, 2018	in Northern Mariana Islands Ep.1	—	—	13.4%	14.7%

Remark

- April 27, 2018: Not airing due to special news broadcast of the April 2018 inter-Korean summit.
- November 23, 2018: Not airing due to live broadcast of the 39th Blue Dragon Film Awards.

=== 2019 ===
List of ratings in 2019 (Episodes 345 – 394)

Episode #	Original Airdate	Edition	AGB Ratings			
Episode #	Original Airdate	Edition	Nationwide		Seoul Capital Area	
Episode #	Original Airdate	Edition	Part 1	Part 2	Part 1	Part 2
345	January 4, 2019	in Northern Mariana Islands Ep.2	9.7%	12.5%	11.1%	14.0%
346	January 11, 2019	in Northern Mariana Islands Ep.3	9.4%	10.6%	10.1%	11.1%
347	January 18, 2019	in Northern Mariana Islands Ep.4	10.3%	11.9%	11.0%	12.8%
348	January 25, 2019	in Northern Mariana Islands Ep.5	6.1%	8.8%	6.5%	9.0%
349	February 1, 2019	in Northern Mariana Islands Ep.6	10.3%	12.4%	10.7%	12.7%
350	February 8, 2019	in Northern Mariana Islands Ep.7	10.4%	15.0%	11.0%	15.9%
351	February 16, 2019	in Northern Mariana Islands Ep.8	8.2%	9.9%	9.5%	11.7%
352	February 23, 2019	in Northern Mariana Islands Last Ep.	8.3%	11.6%	9.5%	13.1%
353	March 2, 2019	in Chatham Islands Ep.1	8.2%	12.7%	9.1%	13.9%
354	March 9, 2019	in Chatham Islands Ep.2	8.4%	11.0%	9.4%	12.6%
355	March 16, 2019	in Chatham Islands Ep.3	8.2%	12.2%	9.2%	13.5%
356	March 23, 2019	in Chatham Islands Ep.4	9.2%	12.2%	10.3%	13.2%
357	March 30, 2019	in Chatham Islands Last Ep.	9.5%	12.3%	10.4%	13.4%
358	April 6, 2019	in Tasman Ep.1	7.3%	11.2%	7.7%	11.9%
359	April 13, 2019	in Tasman Ep.2	7.7%	10.9%	8.7%	12.1%
360	April 20, 2019	in Tasman Ep.3	7.0%	10.2%	7.8%	11.1%
361	April 27, 2019	in Tasman Ep.4	5.7%	7.3%	6.2%	8.0%
362	May 4, 2019	in Tasman Last Ep.	5.4%	8.5%	6.1%	9.3%
363	May 11, 2019	in Lost Jungle Ep.1	6.3%	8.9%	6.9%	9.5%
364	May 18, 2019	in Lost Jungle Ep.2	7.8%	10.6%	8.2%	11.5%
365	May 25, 2019	in Lost Jungle Ep.3	6.5%	9.9%	7.3%	10.6%
366	June 1, 2019	in Lost Jungle Ep.4	6.0%	10.0%	6.7%	10.6%
367	June 8, 2019	in Lost Jungle Last Ep.	5.5%	8.9%	5.7%	9.7%
368	June 15, 2019	in Lost Island Ep.1	8.5%	12.0%	9.1%	12.6%
369	June 22, 2019	in Lost Island Ep.2	6.4%	10.3%	7.2%	11.2%
370	June 29, 2019	in Lost Island Ep.3	7.2%	10.1%	7.7%	10.5%
371	July 6, 2019	in Lost Island Ep.4	5.9%	8.9%	6.6%	9.4%
372	July 13, 2019	in Lost Island Last Ep. (Part 1) in Myanmar Ep.0 (Part 2)	5.3%	8.1%	6.0%	9.2%
373	July 20, 2019	in Myanmar Ep.1	6.8%	9.1%	6.8%	9.2%
374	July 27, 2019	in Myanmar Ep.2	6.8%	10.6%	7.4%	12.0%
375	August 3, 2019	in Myanmar Ep.3	5.1%	7.9%	5.9%	8.7%
376	August 10, 2019	in Myanmar Ep.4	6.4%	8.0%	7.0%	8.8%
377	August 17, 2019	in Myanmar Last Ep.	6.0%	8.2%	6.9%	9.8%
378	August 24, 2019	in Myeik Ep.1	4.8%	6.9%	5.0%	6.9%
379	August 31, 2019	in Myeik Ep.2	4.5%	7.0%	5.0%	7.4%
380	September 7, 2019	in Myeik Ep.3	5.1%	7.5%	6.4%	8.1%
381	September 14, 2019	Chuseok Special	3.4%	4.6%	—	—
382	September 21, 2019	in Myeik Last Ep.	6.4%	8.2%	6.5%	8.2%
383	September 28, 2019	in Sunda Islands Ep.1	5.5%	9.0%	5.8%	9.7%
384	October 5, 2019	in Sunda Islands Ep.2	6.0%	8.7%	6.5%	9.2%
385	October 12, 2019	in Sunda Islands Ep.3	6.4%	8.8%	7.2%	9.9%
386	October 19, 2019	in Sunda Islands Ep.4	5.0%	7.1%	5.6%	7.4%
387	October 26, 2019	in Sunda Islands Ep.5	4.8%	7.1%	5.0%	7.2%
388	November 2, 2019	in Sunda Islands Ep.6	5.8%	8.5%	—	9.0%
389	November 9, 2019	in Sunda Islands Ep.7	5.2%	7.0%	5.6%	6.9%
390	November 23, 2019	in Sunda Islands Ep.8	5.1%	8.0%	5.5%	8.4%
391	November 30, 2019	in Sunda Islands Ep.9	5.6%	7.3%	5.9%	7.5%
392	December 7, 2019	in Sunda Islands Last Ep.	5.7%	7.3%	6.0%	7.7%
393	December 14, 2019	in Chuuk Ep.1	5.5%	7.1%	5.7%	7.6%
394	December 21, 2019	in Chuuk Ep.2	5.7%	7.9%	6.3%	8.3%

=== 2020 ===
List of ratings in 2020 (Episodes 395 – 431)

Episode #	Original Airdate	Edition	AGB Ratings			
Episode #	Original Airdate	Edition	Nationwide		Seoul Capital Area	
Episode #	Original Airdate	Edition	Part 1	Part 2	Part 1	Part 2
395	January 4, 2020	in Chuuk Ep.3	7.3%	9.7%	8.3%	10.9%
396	January 11, 2020	in Chuuk Ep.4	5.8%	8.6%	6.1%	9.1%
397	January 18, 2020	in Chuuk Last Ep.	5.9%	9.0%	6.2%	9.7%
398	January 25, 2020	in Pohnpei Ep.1	5.3%	7.9%	5.6%	7.8%
399	February 1, 2020	in Pohnpei Ep.2	6.4%	7.9%	7.0%	8.4%
400	February 8, 2020	in Pohnpei Ep.3	6.5%	8.0%	7.3%	8.5%
401	February 15, 2020	in Pohnpei Ep.4	5.5%	6.9%	6.3%	7.9%
402	February 22, 2020	in Pohnpei Last Ep.	7.2%	8.0%	7.2%	8.4%
403	February 29, 2020	in Palawan Ep.1 (Hunger Game 2)	6.0%	8.0%	6.8%	8.8%
404	March 7, 2020	in Palawan Ep.2 (Hunger Game 2)	6.2%	7.9%	7.1%	9.2%
405	March 14, 2020	in Palawan Ep.3 (Hunger Game 2)	6.7%	8.3%	7.4%	9.0%
406	March 21, 2020	in Palawan Ep.4 (Hunger Game 2)	6.8%	9.7%	7.5%	10.5%
407	March 28, 2020	in Palawan Ep.5 (with Batac)	6.8%	9.3%	7.2%	9.4%
408	April 4, 2020	in Palawan Ep.6 (with Batac)	7.5%	11.1%	8.2%	11.8%
409	April 11, 2020	in Palawan Ep.7 (with Batac)	6.6%	8.3%	7.3%	9.2%
410	April 18, 2020	in Palawan Ep.8 (with Batac)	6.4%	8.5%	6.6%	9.2%
411	May 9, 2020	in Palawan Ep.9 (in Coron)	5.0%	7.6%	5.8%	8.2%
412	May 16, 2020	in Palawan Ep.10 (in Coron)	5.6%	7.1%	6.4%	8.1%
413	May 23, 2020	in Palawan Ep.11 (in Coron)	5.5%	7.7%	5.9%	8.1%
414	May 30, 2020	in Palawan Ep.12 (in Coron)	5.5%	7.6%	5.9%	8.6%
415	June 6, 2020	in Palawan Ep.13 (in Coron)	4.9%	6.5%	5.2%	7.2%
416	August 29, 2020	in Wild Korea Ep.1	5.7%	8.9%	6.2%	9.8%
417	September 5, 2020	in Wild Korea Ep.2	6.7%	10.2%	7.2%	11.0%
418	September 12, 2020	in Wild Korea Ep.3	5.7%	9.4%	6.4%	10.7%
419	September 19, 2020	in Wild Korea Last Ep.	6.1%	7.3%	6.4%	7.7%
420	September 26, 2020	Hunter and Chef Ep.1	5.7%	7.5%	6.4%	8.3%
421	October 10, 2020	Hunter and Chef Ep.2	5.4%	7.9%	5.9%	8.5%
422	October 17, 2020	Hunter and Chef Last Ep.	5.5%	8.3%	5.6%	8.6%
423	October 24, 2020	Zero Point Ep.1	4.9%	7.6%	5.2%	8.1%
424	October 31, 2020	Zero Point Ep.2	5.2%	7.6%	5.1%	7.8%
425	November 7, 2020	Zero Point Ep.3	5.2%	7.0%	5.4%	7.2%
426	November 14, 2020	Zero Point Last Ep.	%	5.3%	%	5.5%
427	November 21, 2020	Tribe Chief and Granny Ep.1	4.8%	7.4%	5.4%	8.4%
428	November 28, 2020	Tribe Chief and Granny Ep.2	5.3%	6.8%	5.0%	6.7%
429	December 5, 2020	Tribe Chief and Granny Last Ep.	6.3%	7.5%	6.3%	7.8%
430	December 12, 2020	in Ulleungdo & Dokdo Ep.1	5.6%	6.9%	5.9%	7.4%
431	December 19, 2020	in Ulleungdo & Dokdo Ep.2	6.0%	7.7%	6.0%	8.1%

=== 2021 ===
List of ratings in 2021 (Episodes 432 – 452)

Episode #	Original Airdate	Edition	AGB Ratings			
Episode #	Original Airdate	Edition	Nationwide		Seoul Capital Area	
Episode #	Original Airdate	Edition	Part 1	Part 2	Part 1	Part 2
432	January 2, 2021	in Ulleungdo & Dokdo Ep.3	5.8%	7.0%	5.9%	7.6%
433	January 9, 2021	in Ulleungdo & Dokdo Last Ep.	4.2%	5.6%	%	%
434	January 16, 2021	Stove League Ep.1	5.4%	7.2%	%	7.0%
435	January 23, 2021	Stove League Ep.2	6.2%	7.1%	6.7%	7.5%
436	January 30, 2021	Stove League Ep.3	4.8%	6.1%	5.0%	5.9%
437	February 6, 2021	Stove League Last Ep.	4.9%	5.2%	%	%
438	February 20, 2021	Pioneers Ep.1	5.6%	6.2%	6.0%	7.0%
439	February 27, 2021	Pioneers Ep.2	5.3%	7.9%	5.3%	8.1%
440	March 6, 2021	Pioneers Ep.3	6.0%	7.6%	6.3%	8.2%
441	March 13, 2021	Pioneers Ep.4	5.1%	7.4%	5.2%	7.9%
442	March 20, 2021	Pioneers Last Ep.	5.6%	8.1%	6.3%	9.3%
443	March 27, 2021	Masters of Survival Ep.1	6.0%	9.3%	6.8%	10.7%
444	April 3, 2021	Masters of Survival Ep.2	6.0%	9.0%	6.5%	9.5%
445	April 10, 2021	Masters of Survival Last Ep.	5.0%	7.5%	5.4%	8.1%
446	April 17, 2021	Spring Special in Jeju Ep.1	6.0%	8.2%	6.4%	8.9%
447	April 24, 2021	Spring Special in Jeju Ep.2	5.0%	7.8%	5.5%	8.1%
448	May 1, 2021	Spring Special in Jeju Last Ep.	4.4%	5.8%	5.2%	6.1%
449	May 8, 2021	Wild Wild West Ep.1	3.9%	6.1%	5.0%	5.8%
450	May 15, 2021	Wild Wild West Last Ep.	5.4%	7.6%	5.4%	7.9%
451	May 22, 2021	Pent Island: Island of Desire Ep.1	5.0%	6.9%	5.1%	6.7%
452	May 29, 2021	Pent Island: Island of Desire Last Ep.	4.4%	6.9%	5.0%	7.1%

=== Specials ===
List of ratings (Special Editions)

#	Original Airdate	Edition	TNmS Ratings		AGB Ratings	
#	Original Airdate	Edition	Nationwide	Seoul Capital Area	Nationwide	Seoul Capital Area
1	January 23, 2012	Seollal Special Law of the Jungle W	12.4%	13.9%	12.9%	10.5%
2	October 1, 2012	Chuseok Special Law of the Jungle W	14.3%	15.3%	11.8%	12.5%
3	November 23, 2012	Special Law of the Jungle W Ep.1	9.4%	10.6%	10.2%	11.9%
4	December 7, 2012	Special Law of the Jungle W Ep.2	9.3%	11.4%	9.1%	10.6%
5	December 14, 2012	Special Law of the Jungle W Ep.3	9.8%	11.9%	9.8%	11.0%
6	December 21, 2012	Special Law of the Jungle W Last Ep.	10.2%	11.7%	10.1%	11.0%
7	February 11, 2013	Seollal Special Law of the Jungle K	11.6%	12.5%	10.4%	11.2%

== Awards and nominations ==
Year	Award	Category	Recipients	Result
2011	5th SBS Entertainment Awards	Most Outstanding Award: Variety Category	Kim Byung-man	Won
2011	5th SBS Entertainment Awards	Achievement Award	Kim Byung-man's Law of the Jungle	Won
2012	6th SBS Entertainment Awards	Most Outstanding Award: Variety Category	Kim Byung-man	Won
2012	6th SBS Entertainment Awards	Producer Award	Yoon Do-hyun	Won
2012	6th SBS Entertainment Awards	Most Outstanding Program	Law of the Jungle	Won
2012	6th SBS Entertainment Awards	Best Entertainer Award	Choo Sung-hoon	Won
2012	6th SBS Entertainment Awards	Best Entertainer Award	Jeon Hye-bin	Won
2013	46th Houston International Film Festival	First Prize: Real Documentary Category	Law of the Jungle in Vanuatu	Won
2013	49th Baeksang Arts Awards	TV Category: Entertainment Award	Kim Byung-man	Won
2013	7th SBS Entertainment Awards	Grand Award (Daesang)	Kim Byung-man	Won
2013	7th SBS Entertainment Awards	Best Staff Award	Law of the Jungle	Won
2013	7th SBS Entertainment Awards	Broadcast Writer Award	Joo Gi-bbeum	Won
2013	7th SBS Entertainment Awards	Popularity Award	Cho Yeo-jeong	Won
2013	7th SBS Entertainment Awards	Popularity Award	Kim Sung-soo	Won
2013	7th SBS Entertainment Awards	Friendship Award	Ryu Dam	Won
2013	7th SBS Entertainment Awards	Best Challenge Award	Ahn Jung-hwan	Won
2013	7th SBS Entertainment Awards	Best Challenge Award	Oh Jong-hyuk	Won
2014	8th SBS Awards Festival	Grand Award (Daesang)	Kim Byung-man	Nominated
2014	8th SBS Awards Festival	Variety Category - Best Program Award	Law of the Jungle	Won
2014	8th SBS Awards Festival	Best Entertainer Award	Ye Ji-won	Won
2014	8th SBS Awards Festival	Best Entertainer Award	Park Jung-chul	Won
2014	8th SBS Awards Festival	Best Entertainer Award	Ryu Dam	Won
2015	9th SBS Awards Festival	Grand Award (Daesang)	Kim Byung-man (with Yoo Jae-suk)	Won
2015	9th SBS Awards Festival	Best Entertainer Award	Park Han-byul	Won
2015	9th SBS Awards Festival	Best Entertainer Award	Yook Joong-wan	Won
2015	9th SBS Awards Festival	Best Challenge Award	Jeong Jinwoon	Won
2016	10th SBS Entertainment Awards	Grand Award (Daesang)	Kim Byung-man	Nominated
2016	10th SBS Entertainment Awards	Rookie Award, Male	Kangnam	Won
2016	10th SBS Entertainment Awards	Best Entertainer Award	Seolhyun	Won
2016	10th SBS Entertainment Awards	Best Entertainer Award	Kim Hwan	Won
2016	10th SBS Entertainment Awards	Best Couple Award	Seo Kang-joon and Jota	Nominated
2017	11th SBS Entertainment Awards	PD's Award	Kim Byung-man	Won
2017	11th SBS Entertainment Awards	Best Challenge Award	Jo Bo-ah	Won
2017	11th SBS Entertainment Awards	Best Challenge Award	Kim Se-jeong	Won
2017	11th SBS Entertainment Awards	Entertainment Scene Stealer Award	Lee Kyung-kyu	Nominated
2018	12th SBS Entertainment Awards	Best Challenge Award	Jeon Hye-bin	Won
2018	12th SBS Entertainment Awards	Best Challenge Award	Kim Sung-ryung	Nominated
2018	12th SBS Entertainment Awards	Best Challenge Award	Kim Young-kwang	Nominated
2019	13th SBS Entertainment Awards	Grand Award (Daesang)	Kim Byung-man	Nominated
2019	13th SBS Entertainment Awards	Best Challenge Award	Hur Jae	Won
2019	13th SBS Entertainment Awards	Best Challenge Award	Lee Tae-gon	Won
2020	14th SBS Entertainment Awards	Golden Content Award	Law of the Jungle	Won
