= Ryu Dam =

South Korean entertainer (born 1979)

- Born: December 6, 1979 (age 46); South Korea
- Spouse(s): Unknown (m. 2011; div. 2015) Unknown (m. 2020)
- Children: 2

Comedy career
- Years active: 2003–present
- Medium: Stand-up, television
- Genres: Observational, Sketch, Wit, Parody, Slapstick, Dramatic, Sitcom

Korean name
- Hangul: 류담
- Hanja: 柳談
- RR: Ryu Dam
- MR: Ryu Tam

Ryu Dam (Korean: 류담; born December 6, 1979), is a South Korean comedian and actor. He was a cast member in the variety show Law of the Jungle.

== Filmography ==
=== Television series ===
Year	Title	Role
2009	Queen Seondeok	Godo
2010	Sungkyunkwan Scandal	Soon-dol
2010	Athena: Goddess of War	Amusement Park; Shooting Gallery employee (cameo)
2011	Royal Family	Kkak-chi
2011	Lights and Shadows	Yang Dong-chul
2012	Reply 1997	Lee Dae-ho (cameo, episode 8)
2012	Mom is Acting Up	Ryu Dam (cameo, episode 14)
2012	Here Comes Mr. Oh	Oh Jae-ryong
2013	Golden Rainbow	Chun Soo-pyo
2014	A Witch's Love	MC (cameo, episodes 1-2)
2015	The Merchant: Gaekju 2015	Gom-bae
2017	Money Flower	Park Yong-goo

=== Film ===
Year	Title	Role
2005	Baribari Jjang	
2011	Battlefield Heroes	Tunnel guard 2 (cameo)
2011	Super Monkey Returns	Jeo Pal-gye
2013	The Reef 2: High Tide	Roni (voice)

=== Variety show ===
Year	Title	Notes
2011–2015; 2017	Law of the Jungle	Season 1: 5-11, 15-19, 21, 33
