= Kim Byung-man =

South Korean comedian (born 1975)

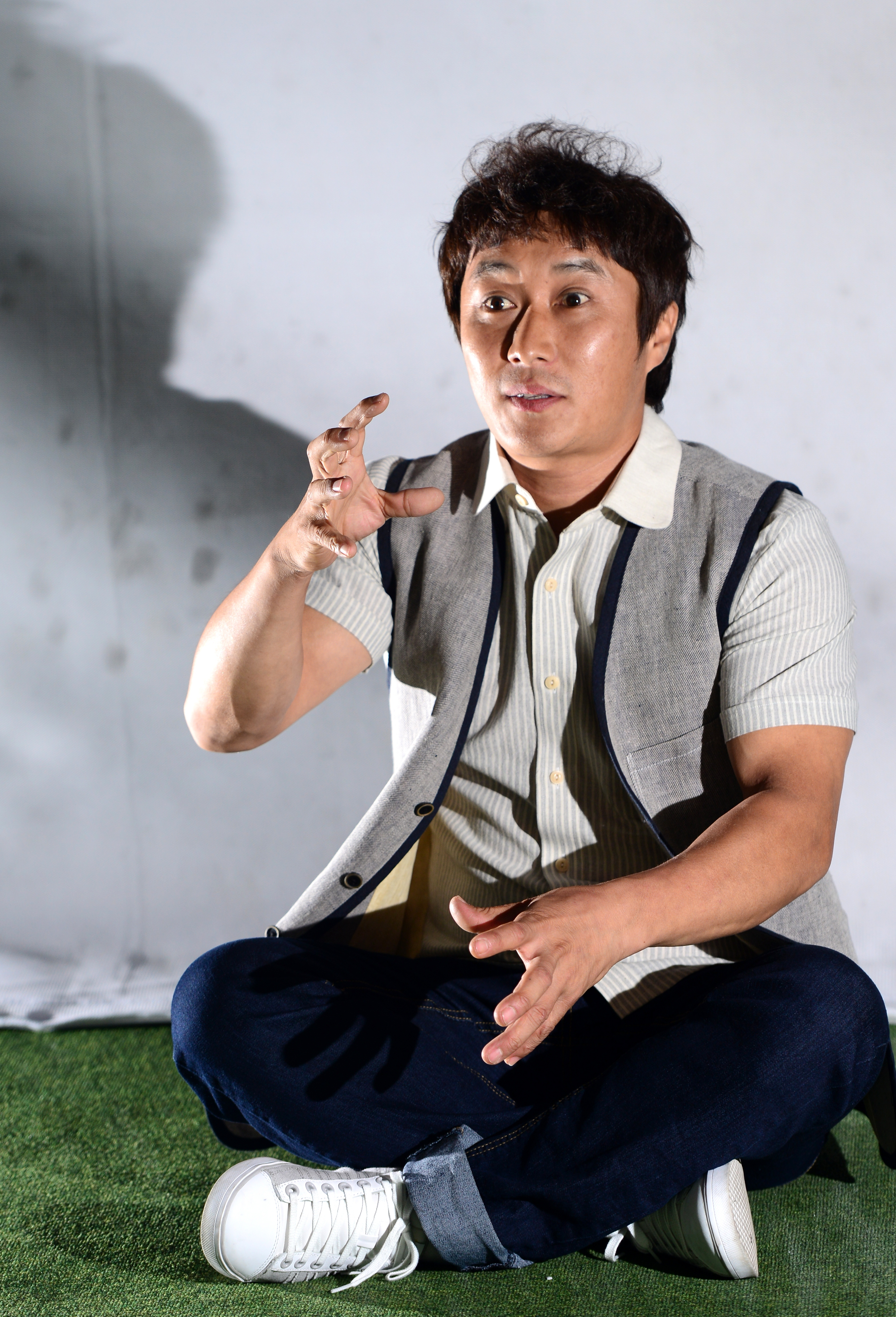
- Kim in 2012
- Born: July 29, 1975 (age 51); Jeonju, Wanju, North Jeolla Province
- Notable work: Gag Concert, The Law of the Jungle
- Spouse: Unknown (m. 2012)

Comedy career
- Years active: 1995–present
- Genre: Slapstick

Korean name
- Hangul: 김병만
- Hanja: 金炳萬
- RR: Gim Byeongman
- MR: Kim Pyŏngman

Kim Byung-man (Korean: 김병만; born July 29, 1975) is a South Korean comedian, best known for his slapstick and acrobatic stunts as a Master in Gag Concert, and survival skills in Law of the Jungle as he acts as the Chief of the show. In November 2015, he entered a new program on SBS titled Shaolin Clenched Fists, where Kim and a group of other celebrities visit the Shaolin Monastery to learn the traditional martial arts from Shaolin Masters.

== Biography ==
Kim was born into a poor family with an older sister and two younger sisters in Jeonju, Wanju in North Jeolla Province. His father was an alcoholic, because of his bad luck in business. This caused his family to be in chronic debt. His mother tried to make a little money working at odd jobs, such as working at a restaurant. Kim also tried to help raise money for the family by doing manual labor. Wanting to be a comedian, he left his home and moved to Seoul to go to an apartment with other aspiring comedians. After three failed auditions on KBS and four on MBC, he was finally accepted by KBS in 2002. He starred in Gag concert on the Master show as a Master, his most famous role, in which he performs difficult tasks, showcasing his ability to acquire new skills quickly.

Kim made his first appearance in the movie called "Gift" (선물) in 2002. He was also the runner-up on Kim Yuna's Kiss and Cry where famous entertainers learn how to figure skate from professionals.

Up till 2012 he was signed under Castle J Entertainment, and on 19 September, it was announced that he has signed exclusive contracts with SM C&C, a subsidiary of SM Entertainment, along with Lee Soo Geun.

== Personal life ==
In May 2022, Kim's mother died in a flood and a private funeral was planned.

== Filmography ==
=== Film ===
Year	Title	Role	Notes
2001	Last Present	Comedian	
2004	The Magic Police	Himself	
2005	Baribari Zzang	Himself	
2006	My Wife Is a Gangster 3	Ssogari	
2007	Three Kims	Third child	Supporting role
2008	Radio Dayz	Truck driver	
2011	Battlefield Heroes	Guard for Cave 1	
2011	Super Monkey Returns	Son Oh-gong	

=== Television series ===
Year	Title	Role	Notes
2007	S Clinic	Gae Jak-doo	
2008	The Lawyers of The Great Republic Korea	Jeon Yi-man (Jjajangmyun delivery guy)	
2008	One Mom and Three Dads	French cook	Cameo (Episode 7)
2008–2009	General Hospital 2	Oh Young Bum	
2009	Jolly Widows	Moon Goon (Yoon-jung's auto mechanic)	Extended cast
2009	Hometown Legends	Angel of death	Episode 7
2010	Boy Meets Girl	Himself	Drama Special
2010	Dr. Champ	Im Ki Man	Cameo
2010–2011	Athena: Goddess of War	Himself	Cameo
2012	Ohlala Couple	Himself (expert who specializes in catching cheating spouses)	Cameo (Episode 2)
2012	What's the Deal, Mom?	Himself	
2012	I Remember You	Lee Deok-soo	
2013	Chief Inspector Choi ll-Joo	Detective Ma Yong-hee	
2013	The Queen of Office	Himself (seasoned raw crab master)	Cameo (Episode 3)
2017	Introverted Boss	Himself	Cameo (Episode 6)
2019	The Light in Your Eyes	Byung Man	Cameo (Episode 5)

=== Television shows ===
Year	Title	Role	Notes/Ref.
2002-	Gag Concert	Himself	
2011–2013	Running Man	Himself	Guest Member - Ep 28, 145
2011–2021	Law of the Jungle	Himself	Permanent member
2014	Clenched Fist Chef	Himself	Along with Henry Lau, Kangin, Victoria Song and Rose Motel's Yook Joong Wan
2014	Eco Village	Himself	Permanent member
2015–2016	Shaolin Clenched Fists	Fixed cast member	Episodes 1-13
2018	Galileo: Awakened Universe	Himself	Permanent member
2018	Master in the House	Himself (as a Master)	Episodes 39-40, 98-99
2022	The Law of Coexistence	Main Cast	with Bae Jung-nam and Park Gun; Season 1–2
2022	Great National Holiday	Cast	MBN Chuseok Special
2024	Zombieverse	Journalist Kim Sal-man	Season 1 Episode 5-6

== Accolades ==
=== Awards and nominations ===
Year	Award	Category	Nominated work	Result
2011	SBS Entertainment Awards	Most Outstanding Award: Variety Category	Law of the Jungle	Won
2011	SBS Entertainment Awards	Netizen Popularity Award	Kim Yuna's Kiss & Cry and Law of the Jungle	Nominated
2012	SBS Entertainment Awards	Top Excellence Award (Variety)	Law of the Jungle	Won
2013	49th Paeksang Arts Awards	Best Variety Performer - Male	Law of the Jungle	Won
2013	SBS Entertainment Awards	Daesang (Grand Award)	Law of the Jungle	Won
2014	41st Korea Broadcasting Awards	Best Comedian	Law of the Jungle	Won
2015	SBS Entertainment Awards	Daesang (Grand Award)	Law of the Jungle	Won
2017	SBS Entertainment Awards	PD Award	Law of the Jungle	Won
2022	2022 SBS Entertainment Awards	Eco-brity Award	The Law of Symbiosis	Won

=== State honors ===
Name of country, year given, and name of honor
Country	Year	Honor	Ref.
South Korea (Note: Honors are given at the Korean Popular Culture and Arts Awards, arranged by the Korea Creative Content Agency and hosted by the Ministry of Culture, Sports and Tourism. They are awarded to those who have contributed to the arts and South Korea's pop culture.)	2011	Minister of Culture, Sports and Tourism Commendation	

=== Listicles ===
Name of publisher, year listed, name of listicle, and placement
Publisher	Year	Listicle	Placement	Ref.
Forbes	2013	Korea Power Celebrity 40	36th	
