= Noh Woo-jin =

South Korean comedian (born 1980)

- Born: June 27, 1980 (age 46); South Korea

Comedy career
- Years active: 2005–present
- Medium: Stand-up, television
- Genres: Observational, Sketch, Wit, Parody, Slapstick, Dramatic, Sitcom

Noh Woo-jin (Korean: 노우진; born June 27, 1980), is a South Korean comedian. He was a former cast member in the variety show Law of the Jungle.

== Filmography ==
=== Film ===
Year	Title	Role	Notes	Ref.
2022	Lovely Voice: The Beginning		music Film	

=== Variety show ===
Year	Title	Notes
2011–2013; 2017	Law of the Jungle	Seasons 2-10, 33
