= Myung Ji-yun =

South Korean actress

Myung Ji-yun (Korean: 명지연, born 1975) is a South Korean actress.

== Filmography ==
=== Television ===
- 2018: The Undateables
- 2018: Misty
- 2014: Everybody Say Kimchi - Im Soo-jin
- 2010: Athena: Goddess of War - Hong Soo-jin
- 2009: Iris - Hong Soo-jin
- 2005: Coma - Kang Soo-jin
- 2003: Scent of Love - Heo Mi-jeong
- 1997: There's a Bluebird - Joon-mi

=== Films ===
- 2010: Iris: The Movie - Hong Soo-jin
- 2005: 틈 (Aperture) - Kang Soo-jin
- 2005: 생일파티 (Birthday Party) - Chul-yeon
- 2003: Too Beautiful to Lie - Hwa-sook
- 2002: 하얀 방 (White Room) - Yoo-sil, In-mi
- 2001: 휴머니스트 (The Humanist) - Sister Rosa
- 2000: 실제상황 (Real Fiction) - flower shop owner
- 1999: 장롱 (Wardrobe) - Chul-yeon
- 1999: 심판 (Judgment) - Chul-yeon
- 1998: 아름다운 시절 (Spring in My Hometown) - Young-sook
- 1997: 바리케이드 (Barricade) - Bhutto
