= Athena: Goddess of War =

South Korean TV series

- Promotional poster
- Hangul: 아테나: 전쟁의 여신
- Hanja: 아테나: 戰爭의 女神
- RR: Atena: jeonjaengui yeosin
- MR: At'ena: chŏnjaengŭi yŏsin
- Genre: Action; Romance; Thriller
- Written by: Kim Hyun-jun; Yoo Nam-kyung
- Directed by: Kim Myung-jun; Kim Tae-hun; Hwang Jung-hyun
- Starring: Jung Woo-sung; Cha Seung-won; Soo Ae; Lee Ji-ah; Kim Min-jong; Choi Si-won
- Composer: Lee Dong-jun
- Country of origin: South Korea
- Original languages: Korean; English; Japanese; Italian
- No. of episodes: 20

Production
- Executive producer: Kim Young-sup (SBS Drama Operations Team)
- Production locations: Seoul, Rome, Venice, Belluno, Vicenza, Padua, Dolomites, Tottori, Honolulu and New Zealand
- Running time: 60 Minutes
- Production company: Taewon Entertainment

Original release
- Network: SBS TV
- Release: 13 December 2010 – 21 February 2011

Related
- Iris; Iris II: New Generation

Athena: Goddess of War (Korean: 아테나: 전쟁의 여신) is a South Korean espionage television drama series broadcast by SBS TV in 2010 and a spin-off of 2009's Iris. Budgeted at ₩20 billion (US$17 million) like its predecessor, the two series are among the most expensive Korean dramas ever produced.

Starring Jung Woo-sung, Cha Seung-won, Soo Ae, and Lee Ji-ah, the series premiered in December 2010 after filming in a number of overseas locations, including Italy, New Zealand, Japan, and the United States. The series is set in the same universe as its predecessor, allowing for select characters from Iris to reprise their roles throughout the story.

== Background ==
Developing on events set in motion in Iris, the story follows the fate of South Korea's ambitious nuclear energy program meant to unify the Korean Peninsula and position the country as the leader in the global energy race. As a result, a new counter-terrorism agency known as the National Anti-Terror Service is instituted and tasked with protecting the nuclear energy technology from potential threats at all costs. Among its ranks is seasoned agent Lee Jung-woo, a skilled operative that has grown tired of his job's uneventful day-to-day affairs. He soon finds the answer to his dull existence when fate introduces him to an efficacious villain by the name of Son Hyeok and the shadowy organization behind him known only as Athena.

== Synopsis ==
The story begins around the same time as Iris, when Kim Hyun-jun is being hunted down by North Korean agents and branded a traitor while in Budapest. South Korean President Cho Myung-ho (Lee Jung-gil) expressed interest in advancing nuclear technology to lead the world with the most advanced and cost effective energy source of the century. To do this, he enlisted black-ops agent Dr. Kwon Yong-kwan (Yoo Dong-geun) to help retrieve a defecting North Korean scientist, Dr. Kim Myeong-guk.

Dr. Kwon accepted the mission, but it was nearly ruined by an Athena team, led by Son Hyeok (Cha Seung-won). Ultimately, Dr. Kwon managed to secure Dr. Kim's retrieval, but he was caught himself by Son Hyeok and tortured for information. Son Hyeok was supposed to kill Dr. Kwon, but he let him live out of momentary mercy. Three years after those events, President Cho re-enlisted Dr. Kwon to serve as the director of the new counter-terrorism task force, NTS (National Anti-Terror Service), to protect South Korea's future from aggressive foreign enemies trying to steal Dr. Kim's nuclear technology.

After Dr. Kwon arrived to be part of NTS, his old rival, Son Hyeok, had returned to South Korea as the new director of DIS (an American intelligence agency). At the same time, SK NIS (National Intelligence Service) agent Lee Jung-woo (Jung Woo-sung) recently transferred to NTS to become their top agent. Unknown to everyone, Son Hyeok is a double-agent between DIS and Athena, an organization of influential people that controls the world's resources for their fortunes. With the help of another Athena double-agent, Yoon Hye-in (Soo Ae), she infiltrated NTS and supplied Son-Hyeok with inside information about their activities. In a major grab for Dr. Kim's technology, both NTS and Athena had thwarted and countered each other in a high-stakes game of controlling the next great power resource.

Willing to do anything to gain the upper-hand for Athena, Son Hyeok had President Cho's daughter, Soo-young (Lee Bo-young), kidnapped in Italy and used her as ransom to gain Dr. Kim. However, Jung-woo rescued Soo-young. To throw off Athena, Jung-woo helped fake Dr. Kim's death to prevent them from trying any further, but that deception was exposed. Athena recovered Dr. Kim and forced him to complete his project for Athena instead.

NTS later found out Dr. Kim was kept in a secret facility in Japan. To avoid making their intel known, Jung-woo was dispatched under false pretenses as a body guard for pop star, BoA, to make it seem their cover wasn't exposed. In NTS's quest to find Dr. Kim, they failed to rescue him, but NTS managed to recover a crucial component to Dr. Kim's technology and Athena wants it back. Using Jung-woo's feelings for Hye-In against him, Athena faked a hostage situation that blackmailed Jung-woo to return the component for Hye-in. However, that was thwarted as well, but at the price of Dr. Kim's life.

Fortunately, Dr. Kim managed to complete enough of his work that other scientists could complete it without him. Before he died though, he also secretly left a code that revealed North Korea's full nuclear capabilities; it prompted President Cho to speed-up peace negotiations between North Korea, but it was a rough process as North Korea found out they harbored Dr. Kim and they intervened against both sides. During this time, all the things Hye-In had done for Athena created a crisis of loyalty and ethics for Hye-in. She is loyal to Son Hyeok, but also developed feelings for Jung-woo. With Athena's new goal of destroying the nuclear project before completion, Hye-in struggles to balance between orders from Athena and keeping Jung-woo alive.

After Son Hyeok's Athena affiliations was exposed, he was arrested by NTS for questioning. However, Athena agents recovered him and he's now planning to kill President Cho. During this time, Jung-woo figured out Hye-in is an agent for Athena, but due to his love for her, he allowed her to escape NTS. However, because of her activities related to Son Hyeok, she was implicated along with his actions. Because Athena questions Hye-in's loyalties, she was confined, but she managed to inform Jung-woo of President Cho's impending danger. Later Hye-in gets arrested is and held inside NTS. She eventually chose to defect from Athena and aided NTS to stop Son Hyeok.

With so many failures, Son Hyeok was stripped of his rank in Athena and his men replaced with a new team. Athena is aware of the problems Hye-in caused; she was also marked for death. Unwilling to allow Hye-in to die, Son Hyeok and his team killed their replacements and gone rogue. Driven by his hatred, he sees NTS (especially Jung-woo) as destroyers of his ambitions for power and taking away Hye-in; he used all his abilities to destroy them all.

In a final endgame mission, Son Hyeok and his rogue team infiltrated NTS. They disabled the facility using an EMP device and tried to kill as many NTS agents as possible. Although many NTS agents were killed, Jung-woo, Director Kwon, and Hye-in managed to defeat them. In a showdown between Son Hyeok and Jung-woo, Jung-woo was proven the better fighter, but Son Hyeok stopped him at gun point. Hye-in intervened to stop Son Hyeok, but he couldn't stop. Therefore, Hye-in shoots Son Hyeok. Hye-in tried to kill herself to end the madness, but Son Hyeok wanted her to live. Soon, Son Hyeok died while Hye-in survives. After recovering from her injuries, Hye-in was given amnesty and she left South Korea. One year later, Jung-woo left NTS to be with Hye-in in New Zealand. He found and surprised her in Auckland, where he hopes to start a happy chapter with her. The drama ends with the main couple smiling at each other.

== Cast ==
=== Main ===
The main cast of Athena, clockwise from top left: Jung Woo-sung, Cha Seung-won, Soo Ae, Choi Si-won, Kim Min-jong, and Lee Ji-ah. Unlike with its predecessor, the actors were cast with Korean viewers in mind instead of catering to audiences abroad.

- Jung Woo-sung as Lee Jung-woo (South Korea)

A special agent with South Korean intelligence under the NTS (National Anti-Terror Service), Lee Jung-woo was described to be as intelligent and adaptable as the protagonist of his predecessor's series, but with the suave of James Bond. Jung-woo was once an agent with the National Intelligence Service prior to being transferred to the NTS. Jung-woo is romantically involved with Hye-in.

- Cha Seung-won as Son Hyeok (United States)

A survivor of the 1992 Los Angeles riots, Son Hyeok rescued Hye-in when they were kids and they became close as siblings. Desiring a seat of great power and influence, Son Hyeok joined Athena some years later in attempts to fulfill his ambition and share his glory with Hye-in. Son Hyeok once worked for the CIA and is now the head of the East Asian branch of the DIS—the fictional equivalent of the United States Department of Homeland Security. By utilizing his position in the intelligence community, he is able to ensure that many of Athena's operations go unhindered as potential threats are preempted and neutralized. While often viewed as a cold-hearted and unforgiving person, he has a soft spot for Hye-in.

- Soo Ae as Yoon Hye-in

Hye-In lost her family in the aforementioned riots in Los Angeles and was saved by Son Hyeok. They grew to love each other as siblings and she decided to join Athena for Son Hyeok. She later became a black agent and provided inside information as a NIS officer. After she was transferred to NTS, she continued to feed Son Hyeok intelligence about NTS's activities. However, all the killings she's done in Athena's name had worn thin on her conscience. After falling in love with Jung-Woo and her change of loyalties, she decided to stop Son-Hyeok to end the madness.

- Lee Ji-ah as Han Jae-hui (South Korea)

Han Jae-hui once worked with the European branch of the NTS as well as being involved in a relationship with Jung-woo. However, their relationship was broken after her father forced Jung-Woo to choose between his career and their relationship. After departing from service abroad, she continued working intelligence in both the NIS and NTS. She would later re-join Jung-woo together in NTS; however, she often suffers in silence as her hopes of rekindling a romantic relationship with Jung-woo is dashed with Hye-in in the way. She later died after trying to stop Son Hyeok alone.

- Kim Min-jong as Kim Gi-soo (North Korea)

The son of a prominent North Korean political figure, Kim Gi-soo learned numerous languages and studied abroad for a number of years. He subsequently served under North Korea's elite black ops agency, Section 35, but later fled his home country and into the hands of South Korean officials. He grows close with Lee Jung-woo, befriending him and becoming one of his closest allies and partners. Unknown to everyone, he was reactivated in the service of Park Cheol-young (from IRIS).

- Choi Si-won as Kim Jun-ho (South Korea)

A data analyst agent working for the NTS, Kim Jun-ho looks up to Lee Jung-woo as a role model and, although he begins as a green agent who is reluctant to return to the field due to a traumatizing incident, he aspires to become an elite spy. It is implied that he has a sibling-like bond with Jae-hui, and was most affected by her death.

- Kim Seung-woo as Park Cheol-young (North Korea)

Cheol-young returns as North Korea's liaison to South Korea. He assigns Kim Gi-soo to help him confirm his suspicions that South Korean had Dr. Kim in their possession. He continues to use Gi-soo to provide inside intel of NTS activities and later warns him to flee after the higher-ups decided to eliminate all defectors.

- Kim So-yeon as Kim Seon-hwa (North Korea)

Former North Korean agent and was Hyun-Jun's second in Iris, she's now a married woman with a daughter in New Zealand. Her previous commander, Park Cheol-young, was worried for her safety as there's a crackdown on defected agents. Kim Gi-soo tried to warn her of the potential danger, but it was too late, her husband and daughter was killed. In her daughter's name, she vowed vengeance against North Korea and will kill all that was responsible.

=== Supporting ===
==== NTS Staff ====
- Yoo Dong-geun as Kwon Yong-gwan
- Choi Yong-min as Nam Dong-shik
- Jung Ho-bin as Kang Chul-hwan
- Lee Han-wi as Park Sung-chul (NTS chief)
- Son Ji-hoon as Hong Jin-suk
- Kim Jin-geun as Park Suk-ho
- Oh Yoon-ah as Oh Sook-kyung (NTS chief)
- Lee Ji-hyun as NTS staff
- Park Yong-gi as Yoo Kang-ho (NTS staff)
- Do Ye-sung s Jung Kyung-won
- Oh Sun-hwa as Young-mi
- Oh Chang-seok as Lee Dong-hun
- Yoo Ha-jin as NTS staff
- Kim Dan-bi as NTS agent
- Choi Gun-woo as Special Agent B2
- Kim Ah-young as Special Agent B4
- Choo Sung-hoon as black agent (cameo, ep 1, 16)

==== Athena ====
- Sean Richard Dulake as Andy (Son Hyuk's subordinate)
- Jung Chan-woo as Chul Kyu
- Im Sung-kyu as an Athena operative
- Arnold Hong as an Athena operative
- Kim Yoon-tae as an Athena operative
- Lee Han-sol as an Athena operative
- Ahn Jin-kyung as an Athena operative
- Douglas Day Stewart as director of Son-hyuk's firm (cameo)

==== DIS Staff ====
- Yeon Min-ji as Jessica

==== Blue House ====
- Lee Jung-gil as Jo Myung-ho (president)
- Lee Bo-young as Jo Soo-young (president's daughter) (cameo, ep 3-5)
- Kim Young-ae as Choi Jin-hee (president's female advisor)
- Jun Gook-hwan as Han Jung-pil (Jae Hee's father)
- Park Yong-soo as Hwang Ho-young (president's male advisor)
- Jung Han-yong as Jung Hyung-joon (president's male advisor)
- Myung Ji-yun as Hong Soo-jin

==== North Koreans ====
- Lee Jae-yong as Captain Kim Oh-gun (North Korea's general)
- Park Sung-woong as Jin Young (North Korea's agent) (cameo)
- Gong Jung-hwan as Seo Min-hyuk

==== Others ====
- Ricky Kim as Viktor Sevcenkov / Sasha
- Park Chul-min as Jang Ki-suk
- Park Eun-seok as Hyeon-soo
- Jin Goo as black agent (cameo)
- Yoo Tae-woong as Kim Sun-hwa's husband (cameo, ep 17)
- Ryu Dam (cameo, ep 1)
- Kim Byung-man (cameo, ep 1)
- BoA as herself (cameo, ep 7-8)
- Heo Tae-hee as BoA's manager
- Onew as himself (cameo, ep 7)
- Taemin as himself (cameo, ep 7)
- Bang Kil-seung as SWAT commander
- Yoon Song-yi as agent's daughter
- Hoon as President's Bodyguard
- Shim Chang-min as Choi Tae-hyun (cameo, ep 16-20)
- Lee Ye-sun as Kim Sun-hwa's daughter (cameo)
- Choi Young
- Lee Sang-hong
- Lee Kyu-sub
- Lee Jae-won
- Kim Yoon-sung as Min Goo
- JC Jung

Appearance in the episode and ranked in the search engine.

== Production ==
=== Development ===
Originally believed to be Iris 2, Athena: Goddess of War was unveiled to the public on March 3, 2010, as a spin-off to its award-winning predecessor. At the time of the unveiling, Jung Woo-sung and Cha Seung-won were announced as the first to join the cast and the male leads. Jung is set to play Lee Jung-woo, a secret agent with the South Korean national intelligence, while Cha Seung-won has signed on to portray his nemesis Son Hyeok, the leader and face of an international terrorist organization known as Athena. The series is Jung's return to television after a break of fifteen years while he worked solely in film. Producer Chung Tae-won revealed in a May 2010 interview that the casting had not come easily. With the aim of appealing to the international market, the production had set out to cast a Hallyu male lead with the same attraction as Lee Byung-hun. Feeling that none could match the success Lee brought to Iris, Chung instead decided to focus on the Korean viewers.

As with its predecessor, the production company announced its intentions to film on location in a number of foreign countries. In addition to primary shooting in South Korea, projected filming locations included Italy, Switzerland, Singapore, and New Zealand.

On April 8, 2010, it was revealed that Soo Ae had been cast as the female lead in the series. Set to portray Yoon Hye-in, a double agent working both with the National Anti-Terror Service as well as a clandestine organization, it was simultaneously reported that she would undergo martial arts training prior to filming beginning in June 2010. Shortly after, on April 14, Lee Ji-ah was announced having joined Athena. Her character, Han Jae-hui, is described by the production company as a special agent operating in the European sector of the NTS.

Amidst reports that SS501 member Kim Hyun-joong had been offered a role in the series, it was confirmed on May 17, 2010, that Kim Min-jong had joined the cast. His role is that of a North Korean intelligence officer by the name of Kim Gi-soo who was detained by South Korean agents while on assignment in China and later defects to the South and becomes the partner of Lee Jung-woo. On June 17, 2010, it was confirmed that Choi Si-won would take the role of Kim Jun-ho, a new data analyst, instead of Kim Hyun-joong. A week later, it became known that Lee Bo-young would be playing the South Korean president's daughter that is taken hostage by terrorists while studying abroad in Italy.

As the first promotional images were released to the public at the end of June 2010, it was confirmed that Lee Jung-gil would reprise his role from Iris as President of South Korea Cho Myung-ho. Likewise, on August 3, 2010, Taewon Entertainment announced that Kim Seung-woo, who played the head of the North Korean security detail in Iris, would be joining the Athena cast. Corresponding reports confirmed that producers were also in talks with Kim So-yeon to return as well.

On August 11, it was released to the media that Korean pop star BoA would be appearing as an actress in the series. Set to play a fictionalized version of herself targeted by terrorists, BoA joined the cast for filming in the middle of August. In the course of the story, Jung Woo-sung's character will be charged with protecting her from being taken hostage. On August 18, it was confirmed that fellow singer Park Hyo-shin would be contributing a song titled "I Love You" to serve as the main theme to the series. Its music video features scenes from the series shot during the crew's stint in Italy.

The cast expanded in early September when it was announced that American actor Sean Richard had joined the cast as a subordinate of Cha Seung-won's character and a member of his organization. Raised in America but born to an American father and Korean mother, the actor is making Athena his second drama after his debut in the medical drama Jejungwon earlier in the year. Later, in October, it was confirmed that mixed martial arts fighter Yoshihiro Akiyama would be joining BoA as a special guest star in the series.

As overseas filming continued, Taewon Entertainment announced that Douglas Day Stewart, a Hollywood screenwriter whose credits include An Officer and a Gentlemen and The Blue Lagoon, had joined the cast and would be appearing in the series as an actor and the head of the terrorist organization. Stewart's involvement with the series stemmed from his answering an open casting call while filming was underway in Hawaii. The production company learned of his screenwriting past only after he was offered the role.

On November 5, it was confirmed that talks with Kim So-yeon had concluded and that she was set to reprise her role from Iris alongside her former co-star Kim Seung-woo. The actress joined the filming when the production moved to New Zealand at the end of November.

=== Filming and promotion ===
Filming commenced on Athena in Korea near the end of June 2010, with overseas shoots in Italy following in July. Additional shooting locations in Japan and China were revealed to be in planning in May 2010 along with a shooting schedule expected to span a total of five months with three crews operating concurrently in different locations.

Principal photography continued as scheduled, as the crew began work in Italy on July 11. The production company revealed the shoot is to cover twenty days in the country, with promotional shots of filming done in Vicenza released simultaneously. The series moved into other parts of northern Italy as well, including the cities of Padua and Belluno. The Italian Tourism Board has fully backed the production which is now expected to film in six different foreign countries by year's end.

Once filming had wrapped in Italy, the crew returned to Korea to continue domestic shoots. On August 23 it became known that Jung Woo-sung's visit at a recent SM Town concert was not a coincidence but was instead for filming a scene for BoA's guest appearance on the series. To lend authenticity and create the sense that a real crowd was present, the production secretly filmed during the concert in Seoul that had drawn over 40,000 attendees.

On September 15, it was reported that the production had landed in Japan to begin a two-week stint in the Tottori Prefecture. Several famous Tottori landmarks were expected to be incorporated into the filming of the series, including the Tottori Sand Dunes and the volcanic mountain of Daisen.

The filming was interrupted shortly into the Japan shoot when Cha Seung-won fell ill with what was initially reported as sepsis brought on by food poisoning. Producers with Taewon Entertainment promptly sent the actor back to Korea where he was hospitalized. Due to the tight schedule, the production continued without postponing filming as the writers revised the script to accommodate the development. Representatives for Cha contended that much of the grave speculation about his health was unfounded and that the actor was expected to make a full recovery from the viral infection that had him hospitalized. Pending good health, the production announced they expected him to rejoin the cast as soon as possible.

On September 30, 2010, it was reported that Cha Seung-won's health had greatly improved and that he was set to once again join the cast in October. Producers with Taewon Entertainment said they planned to limit the number of outdoor scenes for the actor but that overall script alterations to that point had been minimal. Cha was released from medical care on October 7 after undergoing surgery to resolve the viral infection that caused him to withdraw from filming a month earlier. The production company reported they expected the actor to re-join the filming for Athena when they moved to Hawaii on October 20. Cha Seung-won returned to the cast on schedule as production began in Honolulu.

Yoo Dong-geun was announced as having signed onto the production in early October. Yoo signed on to portray Kwon Yong-kwan, the unorthodox head of the NTS.

As the actors returned to Korea from shooting overseas, a press conference to promote the series and its premiere was held on November 30. The entire principal cast was present as montages of scenes featuring their characters were played during their respective introductions.

In early December, production stills from the shoot in New Zealand were released showcasing Kim So-yeon's return. By mid December, the production had returned for filming in Korea in anticipation of the broadcast premiere.

On January 24, 2011, it was reported that the episode scheduled to air the next day would be postponed due to an on-set accident involving star Jung Woo-sung. Filming resumed in time for the episode to be completed and aired the following week. In its original timeslot, a special featuring interviews and recollections with cast members was broadcast.

As filming on the series wound down, it was announced that performer Changmin of the musical group TVXQ would be joining the cast for the final quarter of episodes. His role became that of NIS explosives specialist Choi Tae-hyeon.

On November 23, 2011, it was announced that Athena has been licensed overseas. Funimation holds the license in North America, with the Chinese license held by New View TV & Media and in Germany by Tiberius Films.

=== Broadcast ===
Unlike with its predecessor that aired on KBS, it was announced on April 30, 2010, that Athena would be broadcast on SBS and in the latter part of the year. On July 6, it was reported that the series would premiere in November, with new episodes airing weekly on Mondays and Tuesdays. Later, in September, Star News reported fellow SBS drama Giant would be receiving an additional ten episodes added to its production order, pushing the start-date for Athena back to December. It was soon confirmed the series would premiere December 13, with new episodes to follow every Monday and Tuesday.

Athena: Goddess of War premiered as announced on December 13, 2010, with 22.8% of the domestic television viewing audience watching the premiere. New episodes continued on Mondays and Tuesdays apart from a delay between the thirteenth and fourteenth episodes stemming from a production shutdown as a result of cast injuries. In its place, a special featuring interviews with several cast members recounting their most memorable moments from the series was aired. The series saw its twentieth and final episode broadcast on February 21, 2011.

In Vietnam it was lived on HTV2 since December 22, 2011 with title "Âm mưu Athena" (Vietnamese).

In Thailand aired on Modernine TV beginning April 24, 2012.

In Indonesian aired on B-Channel beginning August 13, 2012.

== Media ==
=== Music ===
The score for Athena: Goddess of War was provided by composer Lee Dong-jun. Two separate original soundtrack albums were made available for the series, with both containing the full score but differing vocal themes. The first, released on February 11, 2011, featured songs from Taeyeon, TVXQ, Kangta, and BoA while the follow-up, released shortly thereafter on February 16, contained vocal contributions by Park Hyo-shin, Brown Eyed Soul, Jang Jae-in, Supreme Team, and 8Eight.

Athena: Goddess of War OST
No.	Title	Artist	Length
1.	"사랑해요 (I Love You)"	Taeyeon	3:23
2.	"아테나 (Athena)"	TVXQ	3:37
3.	"화살 (Arrow)"	Kangta	4:37
4.	"옆사람 (Standby)"	BoA	5:06
5.	"Athena Main Title"		2:32
6.	"Mission-The Long Road"		3:31
7.	"Agent"		2:32
8.	"Attack"		2:00
9.	"Infiltration"		3:54
10.	"Hard Boiled"		2:59
11.	"The Game"		3:15
12.	"True Love"		3:57
13.	"True Love (String Version)"		3:57
14.	"True Love (Solo Piano)"		4:06
15.	"Love & Hate"		1:09
16.	"Conspiracy 1"		1:43
17.	"Conspiracy 2"		2:19
18.	"N.T.S."		1:25
19.	"Cool Bass"		1:11
20.	"Chase 160"		2:11

== Reception ==
=== Ratings ===
In the tables below, the blue numbers represent the lowest ratings and the red numbers represent the highest ratings.

Episode #	Original broadcast date	Average audience share	
Episode #	Original broadcast date	TNmS Ratings	
Episode #	Original broadcast date	Nationwide	Seoul National Capital Area
1	December 13, 2010	25.9 (2nd)	26.2 (1st)
2	December 14, 2010	25.4 (2nd)	25.8 (1st)
3	December 20, 2010	20.2 (2nd)	20.7 (2nd)
4	December 21, 2010	19.8 (2nd)	19.9 (2nd)
5	December 27, 2010	19.0 (2nd)	18.8 (2nd)
6	December 28, 2010	18.7 (2nd)	18.2 (2nd)
7	January 3, 2011	15.1 (3rd)	18.8 (3rd)
8	January 4, 2011	15.1 (3rd)	18.4 (3rd)
9	January 10, 2011	13.8 (3rd)	16.0 (4th)
10	January 11, 2011	12.4 (9th)	13.7 (6th)
11	January 17, 2011	13.0 (4th)	13.7 (6th)
12	January 18, 2011	11.9 (5th)	12.9 (7th)
13	January 24, 2011	13.3 (4th)	13.6 (5th)
14	January 31, 2011	11.4 (8th)	12.9 (6th)
15	February 1, 2011	11.8 (6th)	13.1 (6th)
16	February 7, 2011	12.7 (4th)	14.6 (4th)
17	February 8, 2011	13.6 (4th)	15.7 (4th)
18	February 14, 2011	11.8 (9th)	13.1 (7th)
19	February 15, 2011	11.5 (10th)	12.5 (8th)
20	February 21, 2011	12.4 (5th)	14.1 (5th)
Average		16.1%	

=== Awards and nominations ===
Year	Award	Category	Recipient	Result
2011	SBS Drama Awards	Top Excellence Award, Actor in a Special Planning Drama	Jung Woo-sung	Nominated
2011	SBS Drama Awards	Top Excellence Award, Actress in a Special Planning Drama	Lee Ji-ah	Nominated
2011	SBS Drama Awards	Excellence Award, Actor in a Special Planning Drama	Cha Seung-won	Nominated
2011	SBS Drama Awards	Excellence Award, Actress in a Special Planning Drama	Soo Ae	Nominated
2011	SBS Drama Awards	Special Acting Award, Actor in a Special Planning Drama	Yoo Dong-geun	Nominated

== Feature film and sequels ==
As with Iris and its film counterpart prior to broadcast, Athena: The Movie was shopped to international cinema distributors in anticipation of its premiere.

Shortly before the series ended, the head of production, Chung Tae-won, was quoted as expressing interest in producing sequels to continue Athena and further connect it to other entries in the franchise.

== See also ==
- Iris
- Korean reunification in popular culture
