= December (duo) =

South Korean musical duo

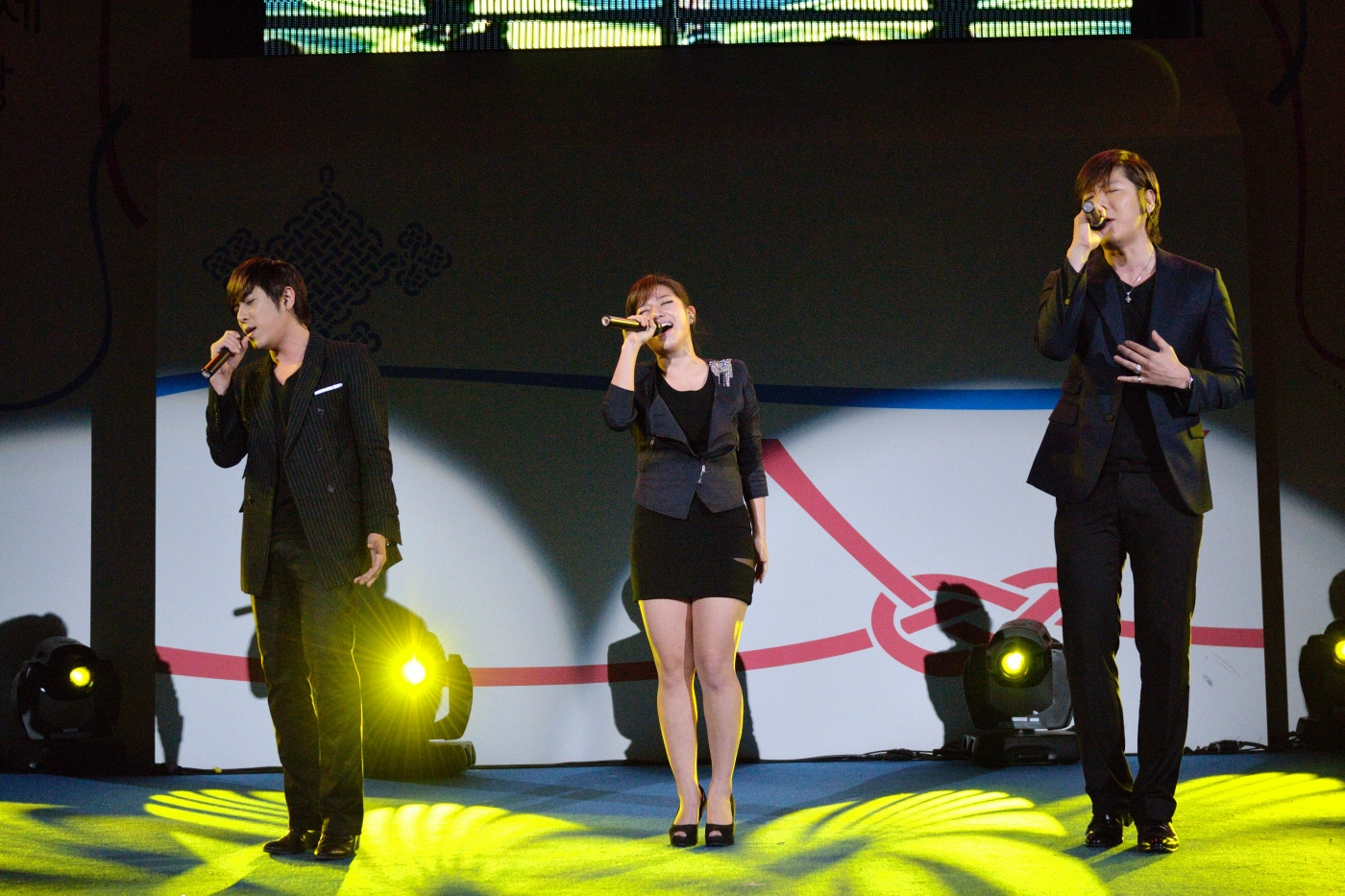
- December with J-cera

Background information
- Origin: South Korea
- Genres: Ballad
- Years active: 2009–present
- Labels: CS Happy Entertainment
- Members: Yoonhyuk; DK
- Website: www.cshappyent.com

December (Korean: 디셈버) is a South Korean duo formed by CS Happy Entertainment in 2009. They debuted on October 27, 2009 with Dear My Lover.

== Discography ==
=== Studio albums ===
Title	Album details	Peak chart positions	Sales
Title	Album details	KOR	Sales
A Story to the Sky	Released: November 1, 2010; Label: CS Happy Entertainment; Formats: CD, digital download	5	—
The Last Legacy	Released: December 20, 2012; Label: CS Happy Entertainment; Formats: CD, digital download	20	KOR: 1,283

=== Extended plays ===
Title	EP details	Peak chart positions	Sales
Title	EP details	KOR	Sales
Dear My Lover	Released: October 27, 2009; Label: CS Happy Entertainment; Formats: CD, digital download	—	—
She's Gone	Released: May 1, 2012; Label: CS Happy Entertainment; Formats: CD, digital download	11	KOR: 1,914
Reason	Released: June 12, 2015; Label: CS Happy Entertainment; Formats: CD, digital download	23	KOR: 500
Perhaps Love	Released: September 30, 2016; Label: CS Happy Entertainment; Formats: CD, digital download	37	—

=== Singles ===
Title	Year	Peak chart positions	Sales (DL)	Album
Title	Year	KOR	Sales (DL)	Album
"True Love..." (사랑 참...)	2009	27	—	Dear My Lover
"Honesty" (배운게 사랑 이라)	2010	7	—	A Story To The Sky
"Tears In Heaven" (별이 될께)	2010	9	—	A Story To The Sky
"Lonely Night" (혼자왔어요)	2010	18	—	A Story To The Sky
"Dazzling Tears" (눈부신 눈물)	2010	15	—	A Story To The Sky
"Shout To The World" (세상에 소리쳐)	2010	51	—	A Story To The Sky
"She's Leaving" (그녀가 떠나가요)	2010	—	—	A Story To The Sky
"Love You More Than Anyone" (누구보다 널 사랑해)	2011	28	KOR: 237,236	Cho Young-soo 'All Star' Project
"Beautiful Woman" (미인)	2011	13	KOR: 815,320	Non-album singles
"Tears" (안녕)	2011	45	KOR: 349,058	Non-album singles
"Love Baton" (바통)	2011	44	KOR: 159,365	Non-album singles
"PS. I Love U" (이 노랠 빌려서)	2012	14	KOR: 635,857	She's Gone
"She's Gone"	2012	8	KOR: 1,338,827	She's Gone
"Unfinished"	2012	9	KOR: 575,549	The Last Legacy
"Don't Go"	2012	8	KOR: 378,238	The Last Legacy
"Memories" (기억을 걷다보면)	2013	12	KOR: 354,288	Non-album singles
"Going Home"	2013	27	KOR: 180,015	Non-album singles
"Fire"	2013	22	KOR: 108,718	Non-album singles
"The Taste Of Your Lips" (니 입술 그 맛)	2013	14	KOR: 181,024	Cho Young-soo 'All Star' Project
"Reason"	2015	55	KOR: 47,064	Reason
"Far Far Away" (멀리 멀리 멀리)	2015	74	KOR: 52,844	Non-album singles
"Pretend" (척)	2015	69	KOR: 45,917	Non-album singles
"Mother"	2016	98	KOR: 19,161	Perhaps Love
"Disappeared" (슬픔이 와락...)	2016	97	KOR: 15,827	Non-album singles
"She's Gone 2"	2017	—	—	Non-album singles
"Love Is Like Watching Stars with You" (사랑은 너와 별을 보는 것)	2021	199	—	Non-album singles
"I'll Give You Everything" (너에게 다줄게) (featuring Jine)	2022	179	—	Non-album singles
"She's Gone" (Remake) (featuring Jine)	2023	-	—	Non-album singles
"—" denotes releases that did not chart.

=== Collaborations ===
Year	Title	Other artist(s)
2011	"Love Harmony" (가슴으로 운다)	J-Cera

=== Soundtrack appearances ===
Year	Title	Album
2009	"True Love..." (사랑 참...)	Iris OST
2010	"Once Upon A Time"	71: Into the Fire OST
2015	"All I Have To Give You Is Love" (네게 줄 수 있는건 오직 사랑뿐)	Reply 1988 OST

== Awards and nominations ==
Year	Award	Category	Nominated work	Result	Ref.
2009	Cyworld Digital Music Awards	Rookie of the Month	December - 사랑 참	Won	
2010	KBS Gayo Daechukje	Artist of the Year	December	Won	
2016	Korean Wave Awards	Singer	December	Won	
2016	Asia Model Festival	Favorite Singer	December	Won	
