= Yang Yun-ho =

South Korean filmmaker (born 1966)

- Born: November 11, 1966 (age 59); Jeju Province, South Korea
- Education: Dongguk University - Theater and Film Studies
- Occupations: Film director, screenwriter
- Years active: 1992–present

Korean name
- Hangul: 양윤호
- Hanja: 梁允豪
- RR: Yang Yunho
- MR: Yang Yunho

Yang Yun-ho (Korean: 양윤호; born November 11, 1966) is a South Korean film director and screenwriter. His feature film debut Yuri (1996) screened at the Critics' Week of the Cannes Film Festival. Among the films Yang has directed since are Libera Me (2000), Fighter in the Wind (2004, for which he received a Best Adapted Screenplay nomination at the 2005 Grand Bell Awards), Holiday (2006), Rainbow Eyes (2007), and Grand Prix (2010). He also co-directed the 2009 television series Iris and its film version, Iris: The Movie.

== Filmography ==
- Criminal Minds (TV, 2017) - director; 20 episodes
- Share the Vision (short film, 2011) - director
- Ghastly (2011) - supervising producer
- Iris: The Movie (2010) - director
- Iris (TV, 2009) - director; 20 episodes
- Grand Prix (2010) - director, script editor
- Rainbow Eyes (2007) - director, script editor
- Holiday (2006) - director, script editor
- Fighter in the Wind (2004) - director, screenplay, planner
- Libera Me (2000) - director
- White Valentine (1999) - director
- Zzang (The Best) (1998) - director
- Henequen (1997) - assistant director
- Mister Condom (1997) - director
- Yuri (1996) - director, screenplay, planner
- Mom, the Star, and the Sea Anemone (1995) - assistant director
- When Adam Opens His Eyes (1993) - assistant director
- The Extra Lanes (short film, 1992) - director, screenplay
- Na ÷ Dul (short film, 1991) - lighting
