= Kim So-yeon =

South Korean actress (born 1980)

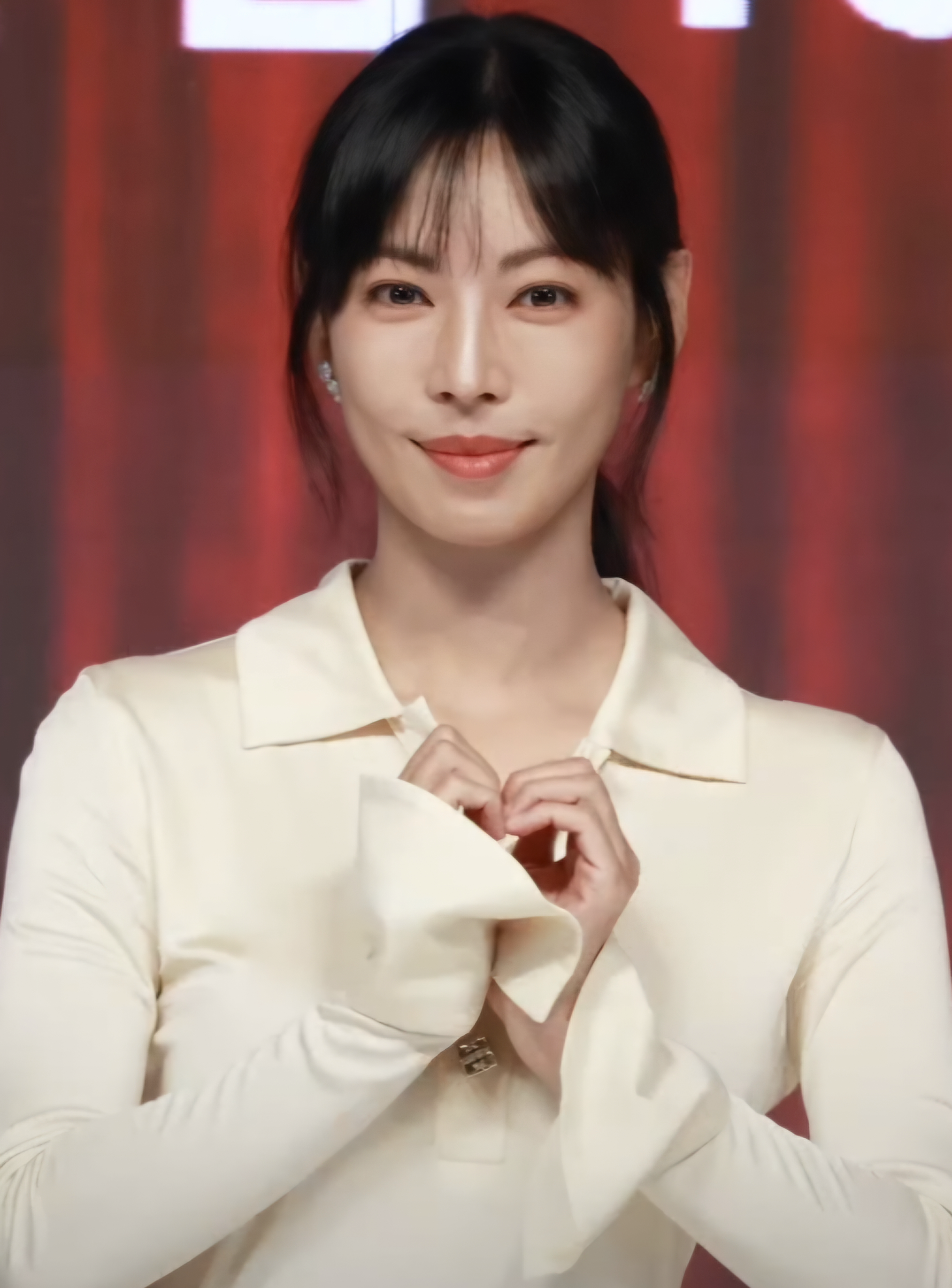
- Kim in October 2024
- Born: November 2, 1980 (age 46); Seoul, South Korea
- Education: Dongguk University (Theater and Film)
- Occupation: Actress
- Years active: 1994–present
- Agent(s): J,Wide Company
- Spouse: Lee Sang-woo (m. 2017)

Korean name
- Hangul: 김소연
- Hanja: 金素姸
- RR: Gim Soyeon
- MR: Kim Soyŏn

Signature
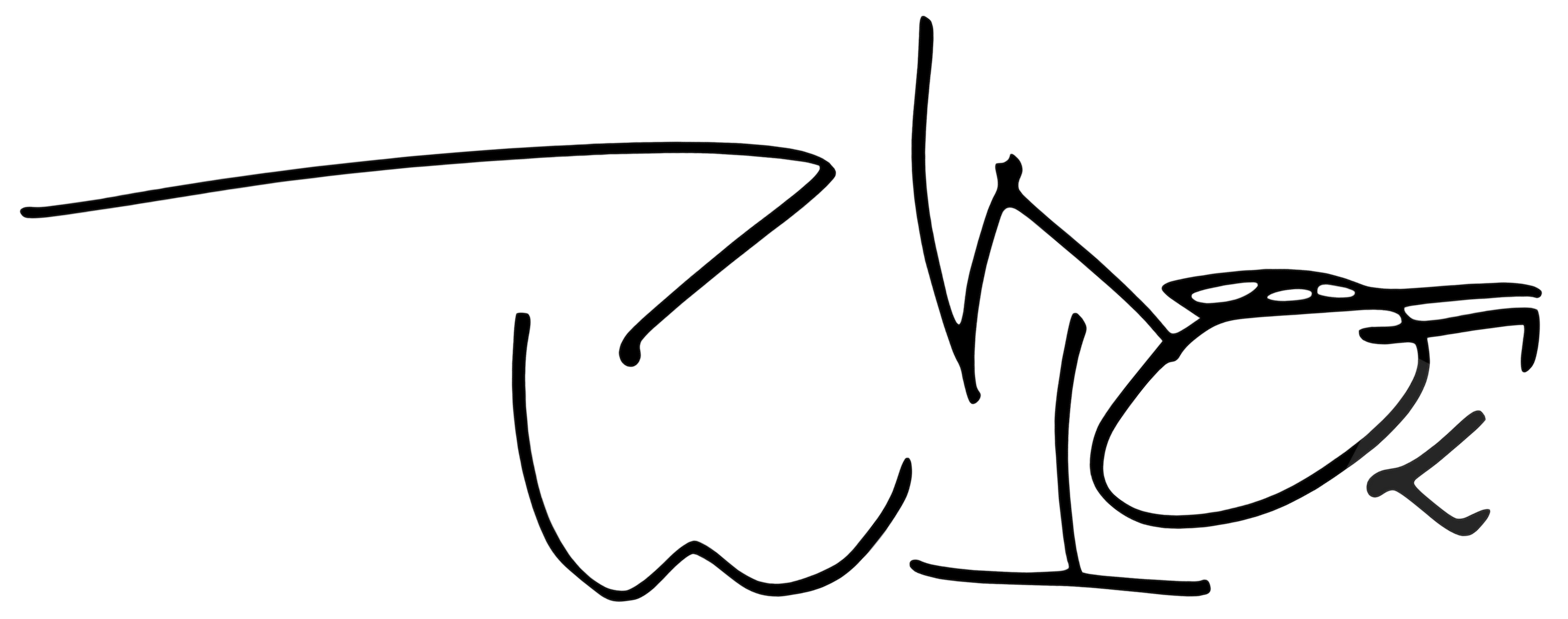

Kim So-yeon (Korean: 김소연; born November 2, 1980) is a South Korean actress. She is best known for starring in a number of well-known television dramas, notably All About Eve (2000), Iris (2009), Prosecutor Princess (2010), Happy Home (2016), and The Penthouse: War in Life (2020–2021).

== Career ==
When she was 14, Kim So-yeon entered the Miss Binggrae beauty pageant without her parents' approval. She had no makeup, so she used a marker pen as her eyeliner and ended up winning the top prize, thus launching her entertainment career. She debuted with a role in the SBS Drama Dinosaur Teacher, and continued to star in popular TV shows such as Reporting for Duty (1996) and Soonpoong Clinic (1998). She also hosted the music program Inkigayo and appeared in numerous commercials, becoming the first Korean teen star to earn more than ₩100 million from commercial modeling. Because of her preternaturally mature looks and poise, she was often cast in older roles notably as a manipulative, villainous, anchorwoman in All About Eve, which drew a peak viewership rating of 45.2% when it aired in 2000.

However, being typecast as prim, cold-hearted characters had a negative effect on Kim's career, and her fame went downhill in the mid-2000s. Her attempt to crossover to China via Hong Kong director Tsui Hark's wuxia film Seven Swords (in which she played a Joseon noblewoman-turned-slave) and the Chinese dramas Just Like a Beautiful Flying Butterfly and Anhui Merchants also proved unsuccessful. Kim took a break for three years, questioning whether she wanted to continue being an actress. She returned to television in 2008 with Gourmet (adapted from Huh Young-man's titular manhwa).

A year later, Kim's career saw a resurgence with the 2009 high-budget series Iris. She cut her trademark long hair and worked hard on her action scenes in order to look convincing in her role as a North Korean spy, drawing praise for her portrayal of a tough woman conflicted about her loyalty to her country and her love for a South Korean agent. Kim later reprised the role in the re-edited cut Iris: The Movie, the series' spin-off Athena: Goddess of War (2010) and sequel Iris II (2013).

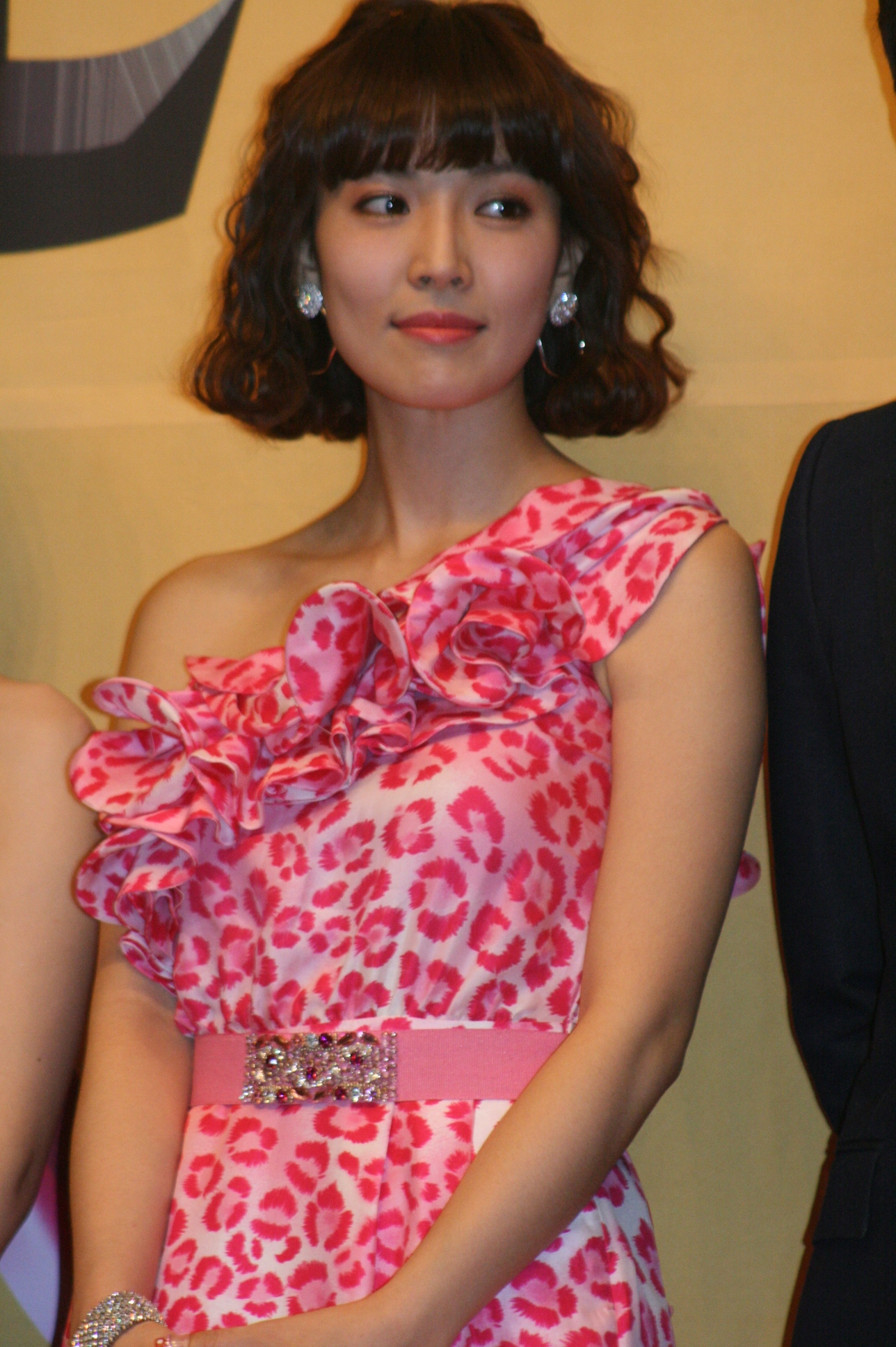
Kim at the press conference of Prosecutor Princess in 2010

Kim was cast in the leading role in romantic comedy Prosecutor Princess in 2010 and showcased her versatility by playing a Legally Blonde-inspired newbie district attorney who's initially more interested in shopping and dating, yet surprises her colleagues with her intelligence and learns to strive for justice. Kim said that the cheerful, unpredictable character was similar to her own real-life personality. Later in the year, she played a rigid doctor in sports drama Dr. Champ.

In 2012, Kim appeared on the big screen as a royal barista embroiled in a plot to assassinate Emperor Gojong in Gabi, adapted from the historical fiction novel by Kim Takhwan. She spent months studying the Russian language and coffee brewing even before shooting began. Gabi was Kim's first Korean feature film in 15 years, since Change in 1997. This was followed by another period drama The Great Seer, where she played a healer in Goryeo.

Kim reunited with Prosecutor Princess screenwriter So Hyun-kyung in Two Weeks (2013), in the role of a prosecutor who teams up with a fugitive to bring down a corrupt politician and her gangster henchman. In 2014, she played a fashion merchandiser who falls for her much younger childhood friend in I Need Romance 3. Kim then appeared in the "Female Soldier Special" of military boot camp reality show Real Men.

In 2015, she starred in her second cable series Beating Again, about a businessman who falls for his secretary after he gets a heart transplant. Kim also joined the fourth season of We Got Married, pairing up with Kwak Si-yang.

In 2016, Kim starred MBC's weekend drama Happy Home, playing a mother who has lost her son in an accident.

In March 2018, Kim left her previous agency Namoo Actors and signed an exclusive contract with J Wide Company on April 3, 2018. She was then cast in SBS weekend drama Secret Mother.

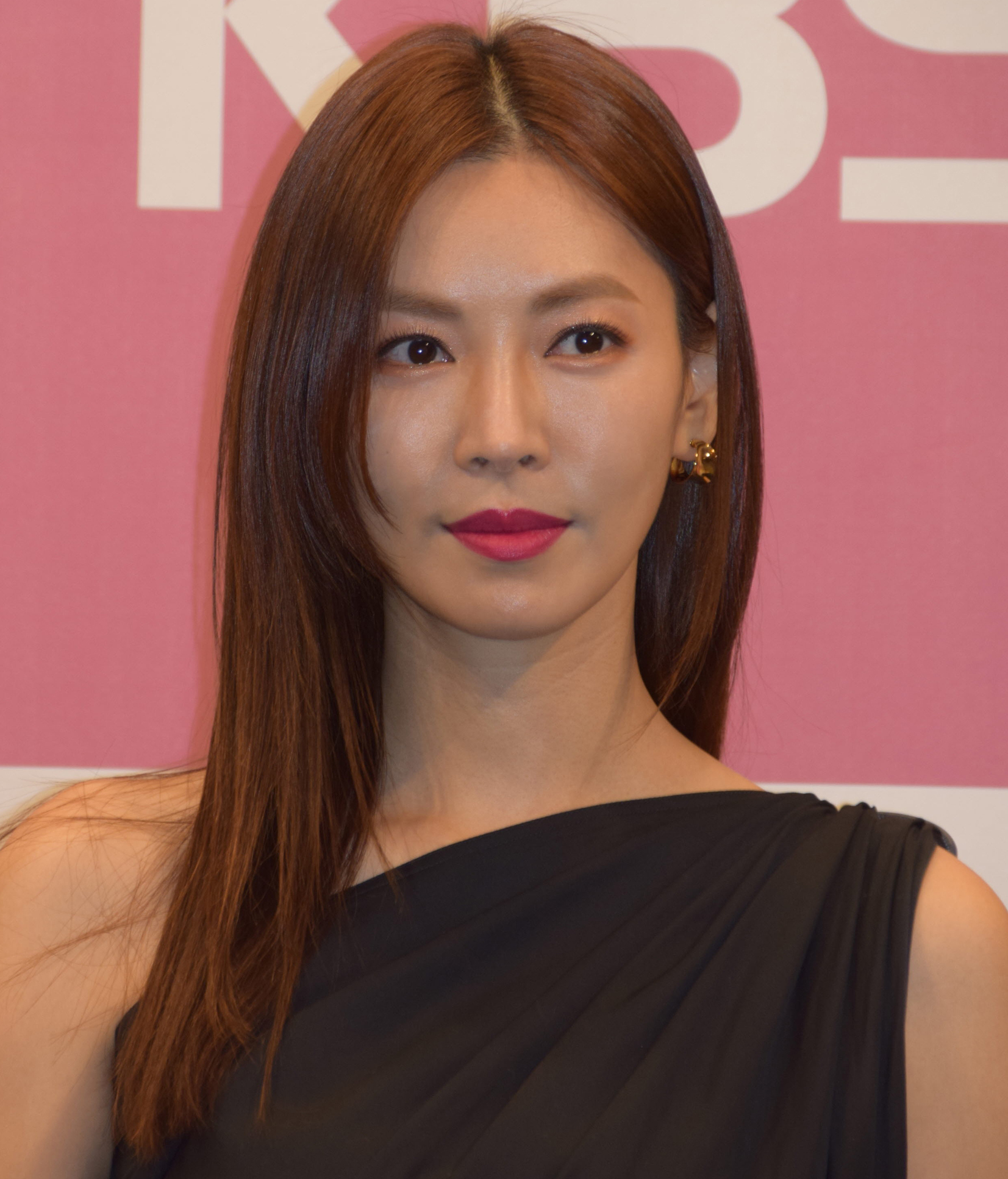
Kim at the Mother of Mine press conference in 2019

In March 2019, Kim returned to small screen with the KBS weekend drama Mother of Mine.

In 2020, she starred in the SBS TV series The Penthouse: War in Life, playing the role of a wicked but famous soprano and musical school director. Kim compared the role to her famous villain role in All About Eve 20 years earlier, commenting "The goal for this drama is that when people think of a female villain, they think of Cheon Seo-jin, just like how Heo Young-mi was remembered." The series drew a peak viewership rating of 28.8% nationwide, and was renewed for 2 more seasons, where Kim reprised her role. Additionally, Kim won the Award for Best Actress – Television at the 57th Baeksang Arts Awards and the Grand Prize (Daesang) (Note: A Daesang (Korean: 대상), which translates to "Grand Prize", is the highest honor given out at South Korean award ceremonies.) at 2021 SBS Drama Awards.

In 2023, Kim made a special appearance in the SBS drama Taxi Driver 2 playing the role of the organization's first deluxe taxi driver. She was cast as the female lead for the tvN drama Tale of the Nine Tailed 1938 alongside actor Lee Dong-wook. She made a special appearance as "Ryu Hong-joo" for the SBS drama The Escape of the Seven.

In 2024, Kim was cast for the JTBC drama A Virtuous Business, as a housewife who sells adult products.

== Personal life ==
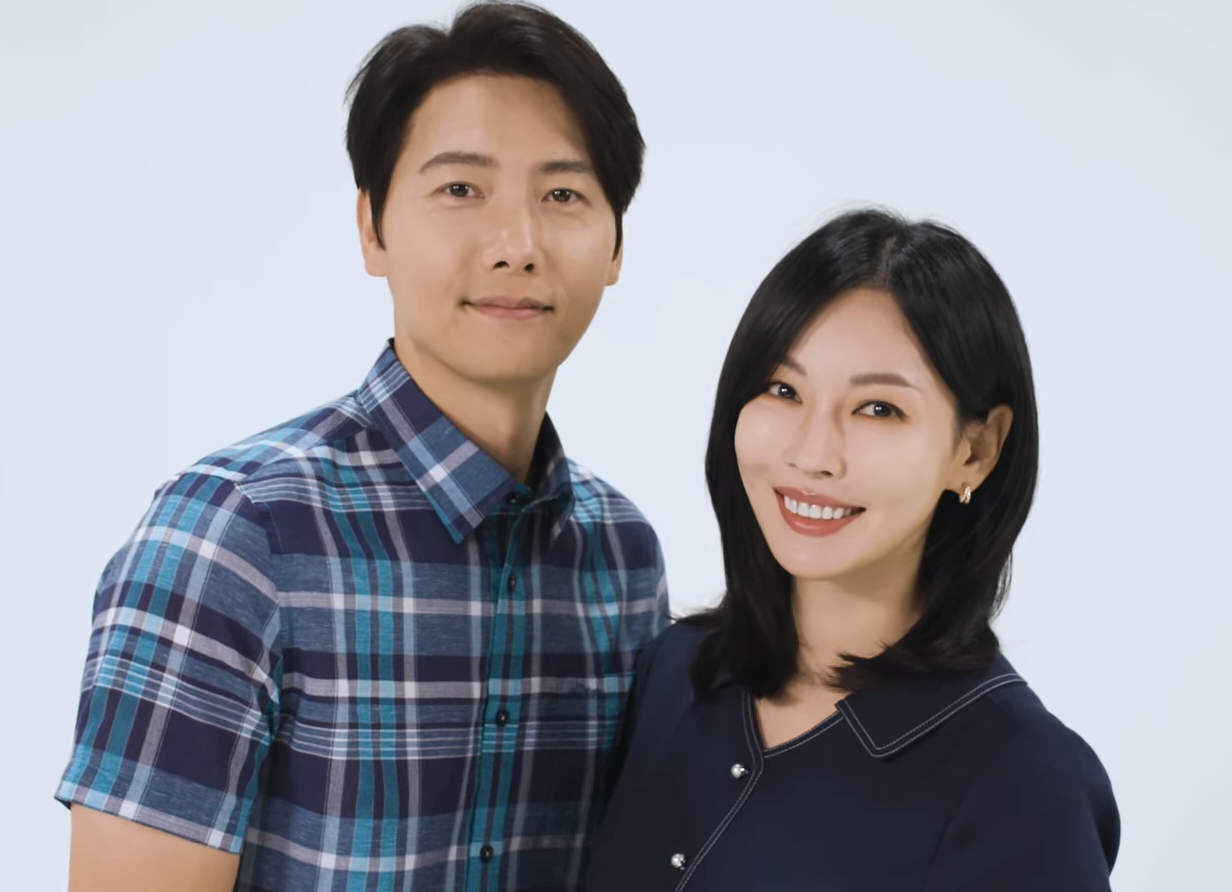
Kim and Lee in 2022

Kim married actor Lee Sang-woo in June 2017. Their romantic relationship started in 2016. The pair met on the set of MBC's weekend drama Happy Home.

== Filmography ==
=== Film ===
Year	Title	Role	Notes	Ref.
1997	Change	Ko Eun-bi		
2005	Seven Swords	Luzhu/Green Pearl		
2007	The Pictures	Photographer	Short film	
2010	Iris: The Movie	Kim Seon-hwa		
2012	Gabi	Tanya		
2015	Love Forecast	Kang Joon-soo's ex-girlfriend 1	Cameo	
2022	It's Alright		TVING Shorts Film	

=== Television series ===
Year	Title	Role	Notes	Ref.
1994	Dinosaur Teacher			
1994	Daughters of a Rich Family	Hye-ri (Kwon Il-ryung's daughter)		
1995	Drama Game: "Min-woo vs. Min-woo"			
1995	Drama Game: "Their Summer"			
1996	You Can't Stop Mom	Eldest daughter		
1996	Drama Game: "Come Back Home"	Park Mi-kyung		
1996	City Men and Women	Yoo Won-hee		
1996	1.5			
1996	Reporting for Duty	Woo Ji-soo		
1996	Open Your Heart	Jung Yoo-kyung		
1996	Seven Spoons	Hye-joo		
1997	Because of Love			
1997	KBS Drama Special: "Christmas in May"			
1997	Yesterday	Lee Seung-hye		
1997	Friday Night Theater: "On Her First Night"			
1998	Soonpoong Clinic	Oh So-yeon		
1998	I Love You, I Love You	Lee Soon-young		
1998	Winners	Kim Seo-joo		
1999	Sunday Best: "Pickpocket by Name"	Kim Ji-hyun		
1999	We Saw a Little Lost Bird	Seo Ga-hee		
1999	Ad Madness	Lee Ye-rin		
2000	All About Eve	Heo Young-mi		
2000	Mom and Sister	Noh Seung-ri / Jang Yoo-kyung		
2002	Sunlight Upon Me	Kim Yeon-woo		
2002	Trio	Choi Seo-young		
2004	Human Market	Hong Si-yeon		
2004	Just Like a Beautiful Flying Butterfly	Jin Zhi Xiu		
2005	Autumn Shower	Lee Kyu-eun		
2007	Anhui Merchants	Hu Yu Ling		
2008	Gourmet	Yoon Joo-hee		
2009	Iris	Kim Seon-hwa		
2010	Prosecutor Princess	Ma Hye-ri		
2010	Dr. Champ	Kim Yeon-woo		
2010	Athena: Goddess of War	Kim Seon-hwa	Cameo (Episode 17 & 19)	
2012	The Great Seer	Hae-in		
2013	Iris II: New Generation	Kim Seon-hwa	Cameo (Episode 20)	
2013	Two Weeks	Park Jae-kyung		
2014	I Need Romance 3	Shin Joo-yeon		
2015	Beating Again	Kim Soon-jung		
2016	One More Happy Ending	Divorced woman	Cameo (Episode 1)	
2016	Happy Home	Bong Hae-ryung		
2017	Children of the 20th Century	Director Kim	Cameo	
2018	Secret Mother	Kim Lisa		
2019	Mother of Mine	Kang Mi-ri		
2020–2021	The Penthouse: War in Life	Cheon Seo-jin	Season 1–3	
2023	Taxi Driver 2	the first deluxe taxi driver	Cameo (Episode 16)	
2023	Tale of the Nine Tailed 1938	Ryu Hong-Joo		
2023	The Escape of the Seven		Cameo	
2024	A Virtuous Business	Han Jung-sook		

=== Web series ===
Year	Title	Role	Notes	Ref.
2015	High-End Crush	Entertainment news anchor	Cameo	

=== Television shows ===
Year	Title	Role	Notes	Ref.
1997	Inkigayo (Popular Music) Best 50	Host		
1998–2000	Inkigayo (Popular Music)	Host		
2009	KBS Drama Awards	Host		
2014	Real Men: Female Soldier Special - Season 1	Cast member		
2015	We Got Married - Season 4	Cast member		
2016	King of Mask Singer	Contestant	As "Nice to Meet You Squirrel" (Episode 77)	

=== Music videos appearances ===
Year	Title	Artist	Ref.
1996	"Why Is the Sky"	Lee Ji-hoon	
1997	"Beautiful Goodbye"	Jung Jae-wook	
1998	"Endless Sorrow"	Sa Joon	
2008	"Classic"	KCM	
2008	"Diary of a Day"	KCM	
2008	"Fluttering"	KCM	

== Theater ==
Year	Title	Role	Ref.
2009	Hamlet	Ophelia	

== Ambassadorship ==
- Government Lottery Ambassador (2021–2023)

== Accolades ==
=== Awards and nominations ===
Name of the award ceremony, year presented, category, nominee of the award, and the result of the nomination
Award ceremony	Year	Category	Nominee / Work	Result	Ref.
APAN Star Awards	2013	Excellence Award, Actress	Two Weeks	Won	
APAN Star Awards	2016	Top Excellence Award, Actress in a Serial Drama	Happy Home	Won	
APAN Star Awards	2022	Top Excellence Award, Actress in a Serial Drama	The Penthouse: War in Life 2 and 3	Nominated	
Asia Model Awards	2011	Asia Special Award	Kim Soo-yeon	Won	
Baeksang Arts Awards	2010	Best Actress – Television	Iris	Nominated	
Baeksang Arts Awards	2021	Best Actress – Television	The Penthouse: War in Life	Won	
Blue Dragon Film Awards	1998	Best New Actress	Change	Nominated	
Brand of the Year Awards	2023	Female Actress of the Year (Drama)	Kim So-yeon	Won	
Broadcast Advertising Festival	2022	CF Star Award	Kim So-yeon	Won	
Busan International Film Festival	2013	Female Fashionista Award	Kim So-yeon	Won	
Grimae Awards	2021	Best Actress	The Penthouse: War in Life	Won	
Herald-Donga TV Lifestyle Awards	2013	Best Style Award	Kim So-yeon	Won	
KBS Drama Awards	1995	Best Young Actress	Daughters of a Rich Family; Drama Game Minwoo vs. Minwoo; What Summer of Two Girls	Won	
KBS Drama Awards	2009	Popularity Award, Actress	Iris	Won	
KBS Drama Awards	2009	Excellence Award, Actress in a Mid-length Drama	Iris	Nominated	
KBS Drama Awards	2019	Excellence Award, Actress in a Serial Drama	Mother of Mine	Won	
Korean Broadcasting Awards	2021	Popularity Award	The Penthouse: War in Life 1,2	Nominated	
Korea Drama Awards	2016	Grand Prize (Daesang)	Happy Home	Won	
Korea Drama Awards	2016	Star of the Year	Happy Home	Won	
Korean Culture and Entertainment Awards	2012	Best Actress (Film)	Gabi	Won	
MBC Drama Awards	2000	Viewer's Favorite Character (Actress)	All About Eve	Won	
MBC Drama Awards	2013	Excellence Award, Actress in a Miniseries	Two Weeks	Nominated	
MBC Drama Awards	2016	Grand Prize (Daesang)	Happy Home	Nominated	
MBC Drama Awards	2016	Top Excellence Award, Actress in Serial Drama	Happy Home	Won	
MBC Drama Awards	2016	Best Couple Award	Kim So-yeon (with Lee Sang-woo); Happy Home	Nominated	
MBC Entertainment Awards	2015	Top Excellence Award for Variety Show	We Got Married	Won	
Miss Binggrae Pageant	1994	Miss Binggrae June	Kim So-yeon	Won	
SBS Drama Awards	1994	Best Young Actress	Dinosaur Teacher	Won	
SBS Drama Awards	1998	Popularity Award, Actress	Soonpoong Clinic; Winners; I Love You, I Love You	Won	
SBS Drama Awards	2008	Best Supporting Actress in a Special Planning Drama	Gourmet	Won	
SBS Drama Awards	2010	Top 10 Stars	Prosecutor Princess, Dr. Champ	Won	
SBS Drama Awards	2010	Top Excellence Award, Actress in a Special Planning Drama	Dr. Champ	Nominated	
SBS Drama Awards	2010	Excellence Award, Actress in a Drama Special	Prosecutor Princess	Nominated	
SBS Drama Awards	2012	Top Excellence Award, Actress in a Drama Special	The Great Seer	Nominated	
SBS Drama Awards	2018	Excellence Award, Actress in a Daily/Weekend Drama	Secret Mother	Won	
SBS Drama Awards	2020	Top Excellence Award, Actress in a Mid-Length Drama	The Penthouse: War in Life	Won	
SBS Drama Awards	2020	Grand Prize (Daesang)	The Penthouse: War in Life	Nominated	
SBS Drama Awards	2021	Grand Prize (Daesang)	The Penthouse: War in Life 2 and 3	Won	
SBS Drama Awards	2021	Top Excellence Award, Actress in a Miniseries Genre/Fantasy Drama	The Penthouse: War in Life 2 and 3	Nominated	
SBS Drama Awards	2021	Best Couple Award	Kim So-yeon (with Um Ki-joon); The Penthouse: War in Life 2 and 3	Nominated	
Seoul International Drama Awards	2021	Outstanding Korean Actress	The Penthouse: War in Life	Nominated	
Seoul International Drama Awards	2021	Best Actress	The Penthouse: War in Life	Nominated	

=== Listicles ===
Name of publisher, year listed, name of listicle, and placement
Publisher	Year	Listicle	Placement	Ref.
Forbes	2021	Korea Power Celebrity 40	24th	
Forbes	2022	Korea Power Celebrity 40	23rd	
