= Rainbow Eyes =

- Theatrical poster
- Hangul: 가면
- Hanja: 假面
- RR: Gamyeon
- MR: Kamyŏn
- Directed by: Yang Yun-ho
- Written by: Han Jeung-ae
- Produced by: Lee Jeong-seob
- Starring: Kim Kang-woo; Kim Min-sun; Lee Soo-kyung
- Cinematography: Baek Dong-hyun
- Edited by: Shin Min-kyung
- Music by: Shin I-gyeong
- Distributed by: Lotte Entertainment
- Release date: December 27, 2007
- Running time: 99 minutes
- Country: South Korea
- Language: Korean
- Budget: US$3,300,000
- Box office: US$2,272,550

Rainbow Eyes (Korean: 가면; RR: Gamyeon) is a 2007 South Korean crime thriller film directed by Yang Yun-ho. The story follows a police inspector who discovers that his friend is now a serial killer. The movie was remade into a Thailand thriller named Cheun, as well as a Tamil film titled Thittam Irandu.

== Plot ==
Kyung-Yoon (Kim Kang-woo) and Eun-Ju (Kim Min-sun) investigate a grisly murder of an affluent entrepreneur. The victim was slashed over 20 times, and there was blood everywhere in his apartment. The killer was careful not to leave behind incriminating evidence, but a strand of the killer's hair was found. The police are then able to determine that the killer is male and has an AB blood type. Kyung-Yoon's personal life is also given priority, with his girlfriend asking to break up with him, saying that he loves someone else and called their name when drunk.

Shortly after the first grisly murder, a second murder occurs. The victims seem to be unrelated, but the modus operandi seems the same. When the police delve deeper into the victims' background, they discover that the two victims were stationed at the same military base many years ago. A month prior to their discharge, they were transferred to another base along with a third man named Jong Ha. The police now believe Jong Ha could be the next victim or the killer. However, their investigation has only led them to Kyung-Yoon's old friend, Yoon-Suh, who was in the same military base and shot himself. The transfer of the trio happened after.

It is revealed through a series of flashbacks that Yoon-Suh was gentle and effeminate. Kyung-Yoon protected Yoon-Suh from bullies but eventually stopped when he got into a fight and got beaten up. He tells Yoon-Suh to man up. Kyung-Yoon independently tracks Yoon-Suh. He contacts Yoon-Suh's old military acquaintance, who reveals that Yoon-Suh joined the military only because someone told him to man up. From there, he was abused and raped by the trio. Kyung-Yoon goes to Jong Ha, who angers him, saying that Yoon-Suh was passed around from bed to bed and everyone had him. He does not apologize and instead makes light of it and laughs, which drives Kyung-Yoon mad, and he gets into a scuffle with them. Later, Kyung-Yoon is seen bruised, and Eun-Ju calls him, saying Jung Ho was found dead.

Kyung Yoon is convinced that Yoon-Suh got a sex change and murdered them. Kyung-Yoon talks with Yoon-Suh's sister, Lee Hye-Seo, revealing that he thinks Yoon-Suh might be the killer, though Hye-Seo says it is not true. Eun-Ju finds a secret passage in the first crime scene leading to the kitchen, where she finds a cook with a weapon similar to the murder weapon. He runs, but he is apprehended. Meanwhile, the other detectives think that the singer might be Yoon-Suh and question her again.

Lee-Hye Soo calls Kyung Yoon tearfully and tells him that everything was her fault. She reveals that Yoon-Suh had met her and had met with the victim by coincidence and thought he might apologize. However, he did not and rather reacted violently. Printing out the identity when Yoon-Suh met with the victim, Kyung-Yoon is surprised at the killer's new identity, which turns out to be his girlfriend, whom he was going to marry.

Kyung-Yoon confronts Yoon-Suh, and she tells that she killed them, at which Kyung-Yoon is devastated and angry. However, he tells her to run. Both get on his bike and escape chase from the police. It is slowly revealed that Kyung-Yoon was in love with Yoon-Suh and could not get together because of his shame. In the previous flashback where he beats up Yoon-Suh, he kisses him. Kyung-Yoon killed Jung Ha, as he saw a necklace with him which he had given Yoon-Suh. Yoon-Suh is happy that she is at last together with Kyung-Yoon.

It is revealed that Eun-Ju knew Kyung-Yoon killed Jung-Ho as she retrieved his lighter from the crime scene. However, she loves Kyung-Yoon and does not reveal it. It is also revealed that Yoon-Suh did not kill anybody, but the cook killed both the rapists who had sexual relations with the singer whom he confesses that he is in love with when he kills her at the end of the movie.

== Cast ==
- Kim Kang-woo as Cho Kyung-yoon
  - Kang Yi-seok as young Kyung-yoon
- Kim Min-sun as Park Eun-ju
- Lee Soo-kyung as Cha Su-jin
- Kim Sung-ryung as Lee Hae-suh
- Oh Ji-young as Jung Mi-sook (nightclub singer)
- Park Won-sang
- Jang Won-yeong as Rapist
- Kim You-jung
- Choi Deok-moon as Detective Lee
- Kang Sung-pil as Ha Jong-bok
