= Kim Seung-woo =

South Korean actor

- Born: February 24, 1969 (age 57); Guro-gu, Seoul, South Korea
- Education: University of Suwon; Bachelor of Physical Education; Graduate School of Business
- Occupations: Actor; talk show host
- Years active: 1990–present
- Spouses: Lee Mi-yeon (m. 1995; div. 2000) Kim Nam-joo (m. 2005)
- Children: Kim Ra-hui (daughter, b. 2005); Kim Chan-hui (son, b. 2008)

Korean name
- Hangul: 김승우
- Hanja: 金勝友
- RR: Gim Seungu
- MR: Kim Sŭngu
- Website: milkyboy.com

Kim Seung-woo (Korean: 김승우; Hanja: 金勝友, c. February 24, 1969) is a South Korean actor and talk show host.

== Filmography ==
=== Film ===
- Chasing (2016)
- Horny Family (2013)
- I Am a Dad (2011)
- 71: Into the Fire (2010)
- Iris: The Movie (2010)
- Curling Love (2007)
- Between Love and Hate (2006)
- Woman on the Beach (2006)
- Heaven's Soldiers (2005)
- Once Upon a Time in a Battlefield (2003) (cameo)
- Spring Breeze (2003)
- Reversal of Fortune (2003)
- Break Out (2002)
- Yesterday (2002)
- Secret Tears (2000)
- A Growing Business (1999)
- Scent of a Man (1998)
- Tie a Yellow Ribbon (1998) (cameo)
- The Man with Flowers (1997)
- Deep Blue (1997)
- Ghost Mamma (1996)
- Do You Believe in Jazz? (1996)
- Corset (1996)
- Millions in My Account (1995)
- A Hot Roof (1995)
- Horror Express (1994)
- The 101st Proposition (1993)
- General's Son III (1992)
- The Woman Who Won't Divorce (1992)
- Kkok-Ji-Ddan (1990)
- Portrait of the Days of Youth (1990)
- General's Son (1990)

=== Television series ===
- President Jeong Yak-yong (SKY TV, 2022) – Jeong Yak-yong; Television Film
- Late Night Restaurant (SBS, 2015)
- Iris II: New Generation (KBS2, 2013)
- The Third Hospital (tvN, 2012)
- My Husband Got a Family (KBS2, 2012) (cameo, ep 5–6)
- Miss Ripley (MBC, 2011)
- Athena: Goddess of War (SBS, 2010–2011)
- Queen of Reversals (MBC, 2010–2011) (cameo, ep 7)
- Iris (KBS2, 2009)
- Queen of Housewives (MBC, 2009) (cameo, ep 3)
- How to Meet a Perfect Neighbor (SBS, 2007)
- Special of My Life (MBC, 2006)
- Rosemary (KBS2, 2003)
- Hotelier (MBC, 2001)
- Mr. Duke (MBC, 2000)
- Memories (MBC, 1998)
- Cinderella (MBC, 1997)
- Scent of Apple Blossoms (MBC, 1996)
- Their Embrace (MBC, 1996)
- The Basics of Romance (MBC, 1995)
- Spider (MBC, 1995)
- Making a Marriage (1994)

=== Variety show ===
- 2 Days & 1 Night – Season 2 (2012–2013)
- Win Win (2010–2013)
- Mr. House Husband (2016–2017)
- Camping in Love (2022) - Host

=== Music video appearances ===
- Jo Sung-mo - "Immortal Love" (1998)
- KCM - "Classic" (2007)

== Theater ==
- Dreamgirls (2009)

== Awards ==
- 2012 KBS Entertainment Awards: Top Excellence Award, Male MC in a Variety Show (2 Days & 1 Night, Win Win)
- 2011 KBS Entertainment Awards: Excellence Award, Male MC in a Variety Show (Win Win)
- 2010 KBS Entertainment Awards: Best Male Newcomer in a Variety Show (Win Win)
- 2009 KBS Drama Awards: Excellence Award, Actor in a Mid-length Drama (IRIS)
- 2006 Chunsa Film Art Awards: Popularity Award
- 2003 KBS Drama Awards: Popularity Award (Rosemary)
- 2003 KBS Drama Awards: Best Couple Award with Yoo Ho-jeong (Rosemary)
- 1998 MBC Drama Awards: Top Excellence Award, Actor (Memories)
