= Iris II: New Generation =

2013 South Korean television series

- Promotional poster
- Hangul: 아이리스2
- RR: Airiseu2
- MR: Airisŭ2
- Genre: Action; Romance; Thriller
- Created by: Chung Tae-won
- Written by: Jo Gyu-won
- Directed by: Pyo Min-soo; Kim Tae-hoon
- Starring: Jang Hyuk; Lee Da-hae; Lee Beom-soo; Im Soo-hyang; Yoon Doo-joon; Lee Joon; Kim Yeong-cheol
- Opening theme: "Do You Not Know" by Davichi
- Composer: Lee Dong-joon
- Country of origin: South Korea
- Original language: Korean
- No. of episodes: 20

Production
- Executive producers: Yoon Chang-beom (KBS Drama Operations Team)
- Producer: Song Hyun-woook
- Production locations: Seoul, South Korea; Budapest, Hungary; Cambodia; Akita, Japan
- Cinematography: Park Jae-hong; Lee Yong-gab
- Editor: C-47 POST STUDIO
- Running time: 60 minutes Wednesdays and Thursdays at 21:55 (KST)
- Production company: Taewon Entertainment

Original release
- Network: Korean Broadcasting System
- Release: 13 February – 18 April 2013

Related
- Iris; Athena: Goddess of War

Iris II: New Generation (Korean: 아이리스2; lit. 'Iris II') is a 2013 South Korean espionage television series. Starring Jang Hyuk, Lee Da-hae, Lee Beom-soo, Oh Yeon-soo, Yoon Doo-joon, Im Soo-hyang, Lee Joon, and Kim Yeong-cheol, the sequel to 2009's Iris continues the story of National Security Service agents going up against the mysterious organization known as IRIS. It aired on KBS2 from February 13 to April 18, 2013, on Wednesdays and Thursdays at 22:00 for 20 episodes.

== Synopsis ==
=== Premise ===
IRIS II: New Generation explores the aftermath events of IRIS as well as Athena: Goddess of War. The story explores the origins of the former Director of the NSS and IRIS agent, Baek San (Kim Yeong-cheol), and the protagonist Jung Yoo-gun (Jang Hyuk). After agent Kim Hyun-jun (Lee Byung-hun) was killed by a sniper shot from IRIS agent Ray (David Lee McInnis), IRIS went into remission to recover and reconnoiter. Three years have since passed and NSS is no longer a secret black-ops division as it once was; it is now a public entity to the world. However, the National Security director, who became NSS's oversight (who never approved of NSS's existence due to Baek San's abuse of power), reduced the organization's abilities and limited it to regulating and controlling federal crime, like shutting down an arms smuggling ring. It is during that time that the current director of NSS, takes note of Officer Jung Yoo-gun, and has him train a new group of NSS agents to manage future national threats.

=== Linked Events in Time ===
In between, former North Korean agent, Kim Seon-hwa (Kim So-yeon), has built a new life for herself in Australia (in the events of the spinoff Athena). After she failed to win Hyun-jun's heart and her family dead in North Korea, she left to settle down in New Zealand to start over. Her life is destroyed after the North Korean dictator decides to crack down on people he considered traitors to the country, resulting in the death of her daughter and husband. With everything she held dear gone, she swears revenge and mysteriously vanishes; her disappearance hasn't gone unnoticed. In the meantime, Seon-hwa's sister, Kim Yeon-hwa (Im Soo-hyang) survived. She and her mother were sent to a coal mine concentration camp as a death sentence, but she managed to escape. Their mother wasn't as lucky and died from the attempted escape. Kim Yeon-hwa is equally filled with vengeance and also wants to find her sister. Yeon-hwa joins IRIS to gain power to get back at North Korea as well as find Seon-hwa.

Well before the events of IRIS II begin, a series of flashbacks reveals both the origins of Baek San as well as Yoo-gun. Baek San is revealed to be Yoo-gun's father. However, neither of them knows the truth. Baek San is tricked into believing the love of his life died along with their unborn child. His lover is also told a similar story and that Baek San has died. Both sides believe they have lost each other. Yoo-gun will be raised on a farm with his mother, occasionally being watched over by a detective (due to his rebellious upbringing) and eventually starts a long-term relationship with his childhood sweetheart, Ji Soo-yeon (Lee Da-hae).

=== Main Events ===
At present, Jung Yoo-gun becomes the leader of the new NSS team, called Team A. He personally trained them and Soo-yeon (former gold medalist ace shooter) joins Yoo-gun and follows him into the NSS. The two have been romantically involved since their teens, but kept their relationship secret to avoid administrative scrutiny. After Baek San is revealed to be an IRIS agent, he has been detained and held in a NSS black prison, where he spends his days reading newspapers that contain hidden messages from IRIS. Just as Yoo-gun begins running field operations for NSS, IRIS finally makes a move against NSS and seeks to rescue Baek San.

On the day Yoo-gun and his team tried to recover Baek San for transfer, IRIS agents made their move first. Ray and his team infiltrated the secluded island's black prison by impersonating as the NSS transfer team. The IRIS team decimates NSS forces and liberated Baek San, but Baek San doesn't want to be rescued. He killed all of the IRIS agents in the escaping helicopter and jumps off into the ocean, making his way back onto the prison island. Ray is the only survivor and had managed to get away before the NSS team reached him. Back on the island, the NSS team find the prison decimated and attempted to investigate and secure the prison. It is during this chaotic take-over that Soo-yeon is taken hostage by Baek San. When Soo-yeon tries to dodge, NSS agent Seo Hyun-woo (Yoon Doo-joon) attempts to snipe down Baek San, but Baek San pulls back and covers himself behind Soo-yeon, and she's shot instead, injuring her shoulder. Nonetheless, Baek San surrenders to the NSS and is placed in heavily guarded detention.

While Soo-yeon recovers in the hospital, Yoo-gun and Baek San start to mutually try and retrieve information from each other. Both have yet to realize their father-son relationship, yet they inexplicably feel drawn to each other and develop a mutual degree of respect and trust towards each other. While the NSS doesn't know of their true bond, they recognize their unusual friendship and allow Yoo-gun special access to Baek San as he seems more open to Yoo-gun and also complies to Baek San's request of newspapers to track IRIS activities. Unbeknownst to them, IRIS has already planted a mole into the NSS.

The National Security director has an administrative assistant, NSS agent Lee Soo-jin (Yoon Joo-hee). She's also an IRIS mole. Using her access privileges as well as having a secret romantic relationship with the director, she equally uses her womanly charms as well as her intelligence to secretly tip off IRIS of the NSS's activities. During a prison transfer gone horrifically wrong, Soo-jin tips off Ray and IRIS kills all NSS agents in one of their secret camp locations. While running for their lives, Yoo-gun's commander is wounded and Yoo-gun escapes with Baek San as he sacrifices his life to delay IRIS's pursuit. IRIS nearly manages Yoo-gun's capture if it weren't for him intentionally driving into a Korean Army base and requesting assistance. In the aftermath, their commander is buried and replaced by Commander Choi Min (Oh Yeon-soo). In the meantime, Soo-yeon has recovered from her gunshot wound and also comes to pay her respects to the commander. Baek San feels indebted to Yoo-gun and decides to tip him off about IRIS's next scheme: disrupting the reunification plans between North and South Korea. Baek San also warns Yoo-gun that IRIS is playing a dangerous game and details of their intent are unclear as their targets could be against the north and/or south. Due to Baek San's suspicious nature, NSS only takes Baek San's words as advice.

Meanwhile, Yeon-hwa accepts a mission from IRIS, but requires the aid of another rogue North Korean asset to complete the job. She travels to Cambodia to recruit Yoo Joong-won (Lee Beom-soo) to help her assassinate the head minister of the reunification plans on North Korea's side to disrupt peace talks. Joong-won desperately needs money and thus, the job appeals to him, but he resists after learning that it is an IRIS mission. However, he ends up giving in, not just because of the reward but also because of his romantic feelings for Yeon-hwa.

The next stage of conflict plays out in Budapest. Both North and South originally plan to hold their negotiations in Russia, but their destination is changed to Hungary to symbolize success after the first failed negotiation in the past (due to the events of IRIS I in Budapest). Yoon-gun and his team are to be the security detail to the former South Korean President Cho Myung-ho (Lee Jung-gil) as he leads negotiations with North Korea. In the end, however, the negotiations fail. Yeon-hwa kills a Chinese servant, Mei, and takes on her identity to gain access to the hotel where the delegates are staying. Attracted by her beauty, the minister welcomes Yeon-hwa into his room and talks her into having sex. While the minister is distracted as he is touching her legs, Yeon-hwa pulls a wire from her hairpin and strangles the minister to death.

Prior to the incident, both NSS and North Korean agent Park Cheol-yeong (Kim Seung-woo) suspect that something about Mei is wrong. Both sides don't realize that something is not quite right until it's too late; by the time both sides realize she's a fake, Yeon-hwa has already killed the minister. The North Korean security detail tries to arrest Yeon-hwa, but Joong-won provides long range coverfire to insure her escape. NSS arrives at the scene and Team A goes on a car chase after Yeon-hwa. With the combined effort of local authorities and NSS, Yeon-hwa is chased down until she is cornered on Chain Bridge. Although thought to be left with nowhere to run, Yeon-hwa escapes by jumping over the bridge, landing right on top of a boat that Joong-won has planned all along. The duo think they are free, but Team A has already figured out that their next likely location is the dock and intercepts them. While Yoo-gun fights against Joong-won, Yeon-hwa is fighting Soo-yeon. Yeon-hwa is captured by Soo-yeon, but Joong-won escapes. As a gesture of goodwill, Yeon-hwa is handed over to the North Korean authorities for interrogation. But the mission isn't over.

Yoo-gun remembers Baek San's warnings that both sides could be attacked and realizes ex-president Myung-ho is in danger. As Team A travels to intercept Myung-ho, Ray ambushes Myung-ho's entourage and unleashes a gun fire fight. Team A makes it in time to intervene. Soo-yeon successfully shoots down an IRIS sniper and Team A helps force IRIS to retreat; Myung-ho is shot in the back and taken to a hospital for treatment. In the aftermath, Yoo-gun's actions are deemed a debacle and he is suspended for a month as punishment. After the Hungary debacle, Yoo-gun returns to service and intends to scoop out the NSS plant. With the cooperation of Choi-min, Yoo-gun intentionally orchestrates a false prison transfer of Baek San to lure the infiltrator as well as baiting IRIS out into the open in order to trap them. As expected, the lure tactic unfolds as planned and Lee Soo-jin informs Ray to attack the transport team in attempts to extract Baek San. Team A has a massive gunfight with Ray's group; but Yoo-gun is shot in the head. In the ensuing chaos of the gun battle, IRIS agents extract Ray's surviving team as well as taking the dying Yoo-gun with them as insurance.

In the aftermath, Lee Soo-jin is arrested after being discovered that she copied the security director's ID card to gain unauthorized access to NSS servers. Soo-yeon is devastated over Yoo-gun's capture and is emotionally compromised. During Lee Soo-jin's interrogation, Soo-yeon shoots Soo-jin's leg to encourage her to reveal the truth, but she can only confirm his death. Meanwhile, Choi-min blackmails the security director to allow her to do as she please in exchange to protect his position. When Soo-yeon shoots Soo-jin, Choi-min sympathizes with her personal situation (as she has lived through something similar in the past), protecting her at risk of her own position. Unknown to everyone, Yoo-gun is being saved by IRIS agents as Mr. Black finds out Yoo-gun is Baek San's son.

Yoo-gun nearly dies from his headshot wound, but manages to survive, and though recovering, he has now lost his memories. Taking advantage of his amnesia, Ray falsely tells him that he's one of their own, IRIS agent Ken. While staying at an inn in Akita-Japan, IRIS agent Rie and her father act as his minder to make sure his old memories don't resurface to cause complications; but the rouse cannot last forever. Meanwhile, Joong-won and Yeon-hwa have since been under Cheol-yeong's custody. Joong-won convinces Yeon-hwa to help Cheol-yeong to gain intel on IRIS. After successfully contacting them through the secret newspaper contact system, the three head off to Japan for a small team operation. Unfortunately, things don't work out as Ray rescues Yeon-hwa. Cheol-yeong is ambushed by Ray and Yoo-gun. Surprised that Yoo-gun is part of IRIS, Cheol-yeong notices that there is something off about Yoo-gun, but most notably he doesn't recognize or remember him, when they met in Budapest. Cheol-yeong challenges Yoo-gun to remember himself while Ray tells him to finish Cheol-yeong off. Yoo-gun, however, doesn't move as his mind is confused and Ray had to shoot Cheol-yeong as he was escaping by jumping into the ocean.

With their mission a complete failure, Cheol-yeong and Joong-won retreat to their emergency rendezvous point. Cheol-yeong survives the encounter, but suffers a bullet to his arm and tells Joong-won that Yoo-gun that injured him. Unfortunately for Cheol-yeong, it is then that Joong-won reveals his ulterior motives and shoots and kills Cheol-yeong. Joong-won later blames Cheol-yeong's death on Yoo-gun to help him rise within the military ranks, however, there is more to Joong-won than at first glance. Unbeknownst to everyone, Seon-hwa secretly arrives moments after Joong-won leaves to confirm Cheol-yeong's death. Joong-won never defected from his country, rather a conservative high-ranking official sanctioned his departure as a means to contact IRIS. After his return to work under Cheol-yeong, he was biding his time until the time was right to carry out his personal agenda; shooting and killing Cheol-yeong. Joong-won subsequently succeeds Cheol-yeong in his position.

Since these events, about a year has passed. Soo-yeon is currently the newly appointed commander of Team A. After Yoo-gun's disappearance, she primarily lives at his home to maintain it, believing he'll return one day. However, the days have been hard on her and she buries herself in work to avoid the emotional pains of missing him. She eventually finds the engagement ring he has kept hidden in a doll during the mission in Budapest and she wears it as a sign and statement of her love for and faith in Yoo-gun. During this whole time, Seo Hyun-woo, 2nd in command of Team A, always has had feelings for her and has done his best to watch over her during her dark times of missing Yoo-gun. Events will dramatically change when Yoo-gun returns in the most unexpected and shocking manner. Yoo-gun and Ray's IRIS team has been assigned to a special mission. Fearful of his memories, the team keeps Yoo-gun away from all too familiar memories and has him focus on a secret unsanctioned joint IRIS-North Korean mission: "capturing" the North Korean general of the newly proposed peace talks. Joong-won, himself, pretends to be part of the security details for the general's safety, but it is but an elaborate ruse to stimulate talks of war between the North and the South.

Yoo-gun successfully infiltrates the secret housing location of where the North Korean general is hiding and aids in "kidnapping" him, thus giving Joong-won the excuse to declare the incident as an act of war, proving he isn't afraid of launching using nukes by priming their missiles. During an investigative mission to learn more about the missing general, Soo-yeon visits Japan to investigate on a solo mission. It is there that she finds clues that lead her to a warehouse where she is confronted by IRIS agents. However, her greatest shock is finding Yoo-gun there. While happily calling out to him, Yoo-gun has no memory of her and shoots her in the stomach, walking away. The IRIS team almost finish her off, but NSS agents arrive just in time, forcing the IRIS team to leave. For Soo-yeon, the moment is too shocking as she realizes that the love of her life, while alive, works for IRIS.

Meanwhile, on the escaping boat that Yoo-gun leaves with his team, shooting Soo-yeon stirs and reawakens his memory. By the time Yoo-gun returns to Akita, IRIS soon realize his amnesia is receding and it's time to cut their losses. Yoo-gun tries to escape, but is captured and Ray almost has him killed. Mr. Black wants to keep him alive and wants to use him as an exchange for Baek San. When NSS receives word of the exchange deal, nobody knows of Baek San and Yoo-gun's true connection and everyone is confused that IRIS would propose a seemingly unbalanced exchange between the two assets; since the exchange is agreed at Baek San's behest.

Before Yoo-gun leaves, he promises Ray he'll find and kill him. However, things go complicated as the deal goes sour between the two. Baek San makes his own escape arrangements and both IRIS and NSS has an all shoot-out. During the chaos, Baek San escapes and Yoo-gun returns to NSS custody to be debriefed and considered to be an untrustworthy asset. Through a doctor's exam, it has been revealed that the bullet is still inside Yoo-gun's head and is causing him to experience headaches, random acts of rage, loss of emotional control, and likely will kill him over time. Because of his health and suspicious actions, the authorities decide to release Yoo-gun, but he can never be involved with government work ever again.

During this time, Hyun-woo and Seon-hwa come and visit Yoo-gun. Both have mixed feelings for him as he has been with IRIS for a year. Hyun-woo is furious at Yoo-gun's return, angry that he could join IRIS and shoot Soo-yeon. However, Soo-yeon is happy that he has regained his memory, in spite of confusing circumstances. Because of Yoo-gun's involvement with IRIS, he is released, but under government surveillance. The NSS has bugged his home and watches all his movements in case IRIS has plans for him once more. However, treating him as a pariah only fuels his anger. Commander Choi-min later secretly rehires Yoo-gun, believing he's the best chance of finding IRIS; turning it into a black-ops mission. Through his hunt for IRIS, he finds out about Ray being involved in a showdown. The two try to shoot each other, but it instead turns into unarmed combat. Yoo-gun's martial arts skills are too good and he ends up defeating Ray. With Yoo-gun holding a gun, Ray dares him to "take the shot" and Yoo-gun, filled with rage and fury, shoots him to death.

It is later discovered that South Korea, in the past, has already mastered nuclear technology. In the original story, IRIS I, three nukes were made and hidden through Seoul in the event that the North Korean Army would manage to take over the south; it an extreme tactic to prevent the enemy from advancing further into the south while decimating their armed forces. After the nukes were completed, everyone involved in the project was killed, including Hyun-jun's parents. The nukes were never used, but they were still active and can be detonated if needed. Baek San secretly recovers the nukes and keeps them hidden them away. He turns over two of the nukes to the NSS and Choi-min informs the president of their incredible find, creating a new window of questionable opportunity. However, the third nuke remains at large, which Baek San has kept buried in an abandoned school.

The current South Korean president is motivated to reveal to the world that the South, too, has gained access to nuclear technology. Partially to gain international recognition and also to show that they can hold their own and threaten North Korea in equal measure and capacity. However, Choi-min doesn't condone the delicate situation and believes this will only complicate matters in every way. But, she had little say in the matter and the government hires a Korean-American engineer, Anthony Choi, to help reverse-engineer the nukes; unbeknownst to them, Anthony Choi is Mr. Black of IRIS. Anthony is now deeply connected with the president in his nuclear agenda. As Choi-min is opposed to this whole nuclear stand off, she tries to hand the nukes over to the American Armed Forces in secret. Unfortunately, she is deterred from this and is forced to resign from her position as NSS commander for her insubordination. Baek San is one of the few that knows Black's true identity and agenda, luring him with the promise of the last nuke, killing him while suicide-bombing himself. However, though a major IRIS operative is lost, only one of the branch leaders is killed and not the overall whole of IRIS; merely slowing them down.

With Mr. Black dead, Joong-won takes over Black's position. IRIS later manages to steal one of the three nukes. After finding out his mother was killed by his own government, Joong-won kills his general and takes the nuke with him for his personal vendetta. Priming the nuke to destroy the city, he is stopped with the help of Yeon-hwa and dies during a gun fight between NSS agents. But the nuke is still active and cannot be stopped. Knowing he is about to die, Yoo-gun takes a helicopter and carries the nuke away. Just before the nuke blows, Yoo-gun confesses his love for Soo-yeon and dies as the nuke detonates across the ocean, saving South Korea from a major disaster. Some time has passed and Soo-yeon has created a merged grave for Yoo-gun and his parents to visit. Yeon-hwa has now lost everyone she loved and feels lost. Not long thereafter, agents of an unknown alliance, suspected to be IRIS agents go after her. It is then that Seon-hwa finally appears before her sister and the duo run off. As the story ends, there is one last unresolved matter: the last primed undiscovered nuke hidden within Seoul.

== Cast ==
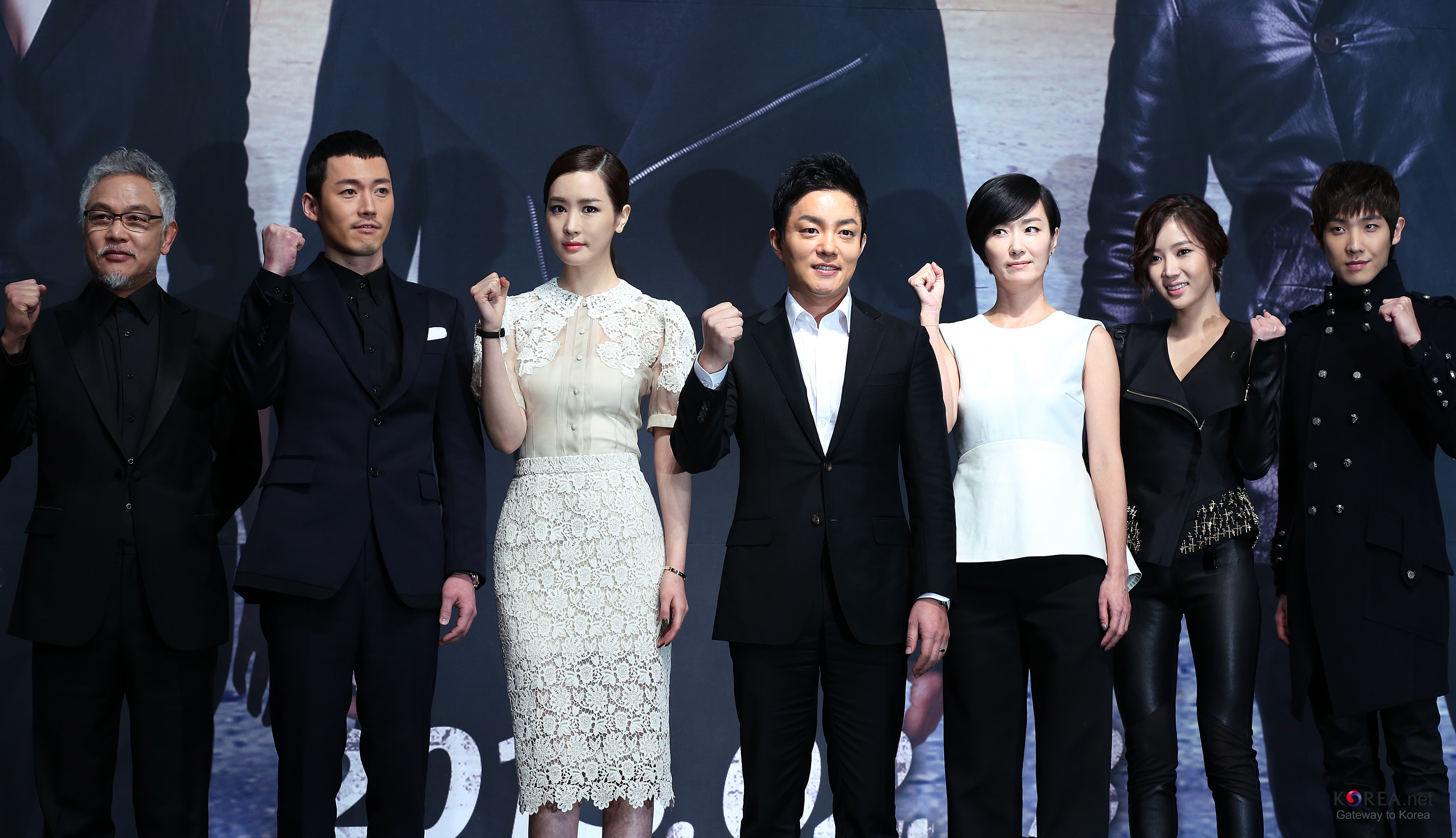
The main cast of Iris II at a press conference

- Jang Hyuk as Jung Yoo-gun (South Korea)
  - Park Gun-woo as young Jung Yoo-gun

The Main Character. The TF-A team leader under South Korea's National Security Service (NSS). While in charge of dealing with the events surrounding Baek San and IRIS, he begins a desperate struggle for his life, and gets caught up in fateful events that change his life.

- Lee Da-hae as Ji Soo-yeon (South Korea)
  - Kim So-hyun as young Ji Soo-yeon

The Main Heroine. An Olympic gold medalist in pistol shooting, she is recruited as an agent under the NSS. She and Yoo-gun grew up together and fall in love as adults.

- Lee Beom-soo as Yoo Joong-won (North Korea)

Formerly a renegade spy for North Korea, his bumbling exterior masks his trained killer instincts. Though he mistrusts the NSS, he finds that they share a common enemy in IRIS.

- Oh Yeon-soo as Choi Min (South Korea)

NSS Deputy Director Choi Min. An elite agent who previously worked in The Pentagon, but was newly scouted to become the Deputy Director of NSS. Hard as nails and cold as ice, Choi seeks to use her position as the deputy director of NSS to combat IRIS.

- Kim Yeong-cheol as Baek San (South Korea)
  - Jung Suk-won as young Baek San

The former deputy director of the NSS. Although widely recognized for his outstanding skill in running the NSS, he was revealed in the previous series to be the head of the Korean division of the secret organization IRIS. He is currently detained.

- Yoon Doo-joon as Seo Hyun-woo (South Korea)

A confident, bright agent who is adept at everything including shooting, martial arts, code breaking, and foreign languages. He has been in love with Soo-yeon from the beginning.

- Im Soo-hyang as Kim Yeon-hwa (North Korea)

The younger sister of Kim Seon-hwa, she becomes a killer who must carry out a Russian assassination to find her sister who goes missing during a mission.

- Lee Joon as Yoon Shi-hyuk (South Korea)

Head of operations backup in the NSS command center. Spy for IRIS.

- Sung Dong-il as Park Joon-han (South Korea)

Head of the counter-terrorism unit in the NSS.

- Baek Sung-hyun as Kang Byung-jin (South Korea)

Genius hacker and computer geek member of the NSS.

- David Lee McInnis as Ray

IRIS operations team leader.

- Yoon So-yi as Park Tae-hee (North Korea)

She graduated at the top of her class from a prestigious university in Seoul but after meeting Joong-won, she becomes brainwashed, recruited and illegally smuggled into the North. After receiving special training there, she returns to South Korea, where she operates as a spy.

- Kim Il-woo as Kang Cheol-hwan (South Korea)

Director of the NSS.

- Joo Jin-mo as Detective (South Korea)
- Cha Hyun-jung as Yoo Hae-young (South Korea)

NSS Dispatch team leader.

- Kim Ji-hun as Lee Seung-hak (South Korea)
- Jeon Jae-hyung as Pyo Jin-hwan (South Korea)
- Yoon Joo-hee as Lee Soo-jin (South Korea)

NSS secretary.

- Go Yoon as Yoo Jin (South Korea)
- Yuko Fueki as Eriko Sato (Japan)

A Japanese woman with the country's national intelligence agency.

- Kim Seung-woo as Park Cheol-yeong (North Korea)

North Korea's liaison to South Korea.

- Yoon Joo-sang as Oh Hyun-kyu (South Korea)

Head of the NSS forensics and scientific investigations section.

- Jo Sung-ha as Ha Seung-jin (South Korea)

Current President of South Korea.

- Lee Jung-gil as Cho Myung-ho (South Korea)

Former President of South Korea.

- Lee Bo-hee as Jung Soo-min / Jung Ji-young

Yoo-gun's mother and Baek San's former lover.

- Kim Kap-soo as Mr. Black

Head of the IRIS.

- Kang Shin-hyo as Jang Chul

== Production ==
The series is directed by Pyo Min-soo, and Kim Tae-hoon.

Filming locations for the series include Seoul, South Korea, Budapest, Hungary, and Akita, Japan. It is also the first production to shoot in Angkor Wat in Cambodia since the 2001 film Lara Croft: Tomb Raider.

== Original soundtrack ==
아이리스 2 / IRIS 2 : Original Soundtrack

Soundtrack album by Various Artists
- Released: April 18, 2013
- Genres: Pop, K-pop, soundtrack
- Languages: Korean, English

Track Listing:
No.	Title	Artist	Length
1.	"모르시나요" (Don't You Know?)	Davichi	5:09
2.	"어떤가요" (How Are You?)	Noel	4:21
3.	"Black Paradise"	Beast	4:32
4.	"잊지말아요" (Don't Forget)	Sohyang	4:49
5.	"I Love You"	Soul Cry	3:29
6.	"바보같은 나" (Foolish Me)	G.O & Mir of MBLAQ	3:49
7.	"매일하는 이별" (Everyday I Let You Go)	Ami	3:27
8.	"Theme For Yoo Joong-won"	Kim Woo-chul	1:27
9.	"The Final Barrier"	Kim Woo-chul	4:40
10.	"Discord"	Kim Woo-chul	2:14
11.	"State of Tension"	Kim Woo-chul	2:29
12.	"Secret Movement"	Kim Woo-chul	4:09
13.	"Suspicion 1"	Kim Woo-chul	4:41
14.	"Suspicion 2"	Kim Woo-chul	3:45
15.	"Suspicion 3"	Kim Woo-chul	2:16
16.	"The Sentimental Mood"	Various Artists	3:40

== Reception ==
According to AGB Nielsen Media Research, the premiere episode achieved a nationwide rating of 14.4 percent in viewership, ranked first ahead of 7th Grade Civil Servant on MBC and That Winter, the Wind Blows on SBS. By the second episode the series was joint first with That Winter at 12.4 percent, then both episodes the following week dropped to third in their timeslot. In its third week, That Winter remained on top, while its Iris competed for second place with small differences in viewership rating with Civil Servant.

Episode #	Original broadcast date	Average audience share			
Episode #	Original broadcast date	TNmS Ratings		AGB Nielsen	
Episode #	Original broadcast date	Nationwide	Seoul National Capital Area	Nationwide	Seoul National Capital Area
1	13 February 2013	17.0%	19.3%	14.4%	15.3%
2	14 February 2013	15.0%	16.9%	12.4%	12.0%
3	20 February 2013	12.2%	13.2%	10.8%	10.7%
4	21 February 2013	11.7%	12.9%	10.7%	10.5%
5	27 February 2013	11.6%	13.5%	10.1%	10.0%
6	28 February 2013	10.8%	12.1%	10.1%	10.1%
7	6 March 2013	11.1%	12.0%	9.4%	9.3%
8	7 March 2013	11.2%	12.4%	9.5%	9.8%
9	13 March 2013	10.6%	11.6%	10.0%	9.6%
10	14 March 2013	9.7%	10.4%	10.0%	9.5%
11	20 March 2013	10.4%	12.0%	9.5%	9.0%
12	21 March 2013	10.6%	11.3%	10.5%	10.2%
13	27 March 2013	10.6%	11.8%	9.6%	9.4%
14	28 March 2013	10.4%	11.9%	10.3%	10.2%
15	3 April 2013	10.6%	11.3%	10.2%	10.3%
16	4 April 2013	11.3%	12.5%	11.1%	10.9%
17	10 April 2013	10.5%	11.3%	9.7%	9.6%
18	11 April 2013	9.8%	10.4%	8.2%	8.7%
19	17 April 2013	8.8%	9.2%	9.7%	10.7%
20	18 April 2013	10.5%	11.4%	10.4%	10.7%

== International broadcast ==
- It aired in Japan on cable channel LaLaTV.
- It aired in Thailand on Channel 7 from May 2013.
- It aired in Vietnam on HTV2 from March 7, 2014.
- It aired in Indonesia on RTV from April 23, 2016.
- It aired in Brazil on Rede Brasil from November 5, 2018. Also aired in on Loading from February 3, 2021.
- It will air in Canada rarely on TVOntario on November 17, 2021 from 7:55am to 8:18am EST for at least one episode due to broadcasting situations.

== See also ==
- Iris
- Athena: Goddess of War
- Korean reunification in popular culture
