= Iris (South Korean TV series) =

2009 South Korean television series

- Promotional poster
- Hangul: 아이리스
- RR: Airiseu
- MR: Airisŭ
- Genre: Action; Espionage; Romance; Thriller
- Created by: Jung Tae-won
- Written by: Choi Wan-kyu; Kim Hyun-jun; Jo Gyu-won; Kim Jae-un
- Directed by: Kim Kyu-tae; Yang Yun-ho; Kim Tae-hun; Pyo Min-soo
- Starring: Lee Byung-hun; Kim Tae-hee; Jung Joon-ho; Kim Seung-woo; Kim So-yeon; Choi Seung-hyun
- Composers: Lee Dong-joon; Choi Sung-kown
- Country of origin: South Korea
- Original languages: Korean; English; Japanese; Hungarian; Mandarin
- No. of episodes: 20

Production
- Executive producer: Choi Ji-young
- Producer: Kim Young-jo
- Production locations: Seoul, South Korea; Akita, Japan; Shanghai, China; Budapest, Hungary
- Camera setup: Single-camera
- Running time: 60 minutes
- Production companies: Taewon Entertainment; H Plus
- Budget: ₩40 billion

Original release
- Network: KBS2
- Release: October 14 – December 17, 2009

Related
- Athena: Goddess of War

Iris (Korean: 아이리스) is a 2009 South Korean television series starring Lee Byung-hun, Kim Tae-hee, Jung Joon-ho, Kim Seung-woo, Kim So-yeon and Choi Seung-hyun. The plot revolves around two best friends from the 707th Special Mission Group recruited into a secret South Korean black ops agency known as the National Security Service. As the two friends find their loyalties tested and forge new, unlikely alliances, the journey takes them from their home country to Hungary, Japan, and China where they find themselves at the center of an international conspiracy. It aired on KBS2 from October 14 to December 17, 2009, every Wednesday and Thursday at 21:55 (KST).

With a budget in excess of ₩40 billion (US$29.84 million), Iris along with its spin-off Athena: Goddess of War, share the record for the most expensive Korean dramas ever produced. The series was a critical and commercial success, with an average viewership of over 30% in addition to ranking as the top program consistently every week after its debut. The series also took home many of the highest honors at the 2009 KBS Drama Awards, including the Daesang Award for Lee Byung-hun.

The success of the series has led to a feature film, a 2010 spin-off, and a sequel series in 2013.

== Synopsis ==
Two best friends who are so close that they are like brothers, Kim Hyun-jun (Lee Byung-hun) and Jin Sa-woo (Jung Joon-ho), train under the Republic of Korea Army's 707th Special Mission Group until they are scouted by NSS (National Security Service). The two were independently scouted by the beautiful NSS agent, Choi Seung-hee (Kim Tae-hee). Unaware they have been scouted, the two are secretly captured and subjected to a simulated torture test. Both pass the test and are deemed qualified to become NSS agents. In the process, they both fall in love with Seung-hee, who has kept the scouting process a secret from them.

After completing the test, Hyun-jun and Sa-woo are introduced to the director of the NSS, Baek San (Kim Yeong-cheol). Baek San explains to them that the NSS is a secret organization tasked with preempting foreign threats and protecting the country's interests through wetwork operations, including assassination of anyone who could be a threat to South Korean (SK) national security. Since its founding in 1976, during the rule of Park Chung Hee, the agency's existence has remained a state secret from everyone, including the President.

After entering NSS, the pair learn that Seung-hee had been their undercover scout agent. While both were surprised and somewhat hurt, Hyun-jun is angered the most as he feels his heart was toyed with. During a team celebration dinner, Hyun-jun confronts her alone and the two embraced the passion they have for one another. Afterward, the two maintain a secret romantic relationship.

Hyun-jun is then sent off on a solo mission to Budapest, Hungary. There, Hyun-jun accomplishes his mission and while escaping, is wounded. Shortly later, Hyun-jun finds out that he was betrayed by fellow agent Sa-woo. Seung-hee attempts to help Hyun-jun escape, but a car explosion separates the two and both are misled into believing that the other is dead. Hyun-jun is then saved by an unknown voice and learns of the secret society "IRIS".

One year later, Hyun-jun returns to Korea to seek revenge. During this time, North and South Korea are set to reunify. However, the members of IRIS are intent on preventing the reunification. They attack a local mall and take hostages so that they can blackmail both sides of the Korean government and threaten SK's president into announcing their political stand to not unite with NK. Hyun-jun becomes the negotiator for the president Cho Myung-ho (Lee Jung-gil) and for the hostages' release. Eventually, Sa-woo is killed. With the obstacles to the reunification process removed, the peace talks resume.

At the reunification summit, the president personally requests Hyun-jun to be at his side. Concurrently, NSS agents realize they have been duped: the presumed dead IRIS agents at the mall crisis were actually the hostages. The true IRIS agents escaped and infiltrated the summit to kill all delegates. IRIS agents kill and replace various security agents for a massacre. Fortunately, it fails due to Seung-hee's intervention. She pretends to be an IRIS agent and uses the confusion to stop them. This creates mass panic as IRIS agents make their stand against all security forces. Ultimately, the SK president and NK forces survive the assault and Hyun-jun saves the day again.

In the aftermath, Hyun-jun and Seung-hee leave NSS for a normal life. While Seung-hee waits at a lighthouse for Hyun-jun, he drives up to meet her and propose. However, during the drive, Hyun-jun is shot in the head by a sniper. He dies while looking at Seung-hee at a distance away at the lighthouse, unbeknownst to her.

== Cast ==
Iris featured an ensemble cast split between characters of North Korean and South Korean descent. Because the series explores the tension and mentality behind the two sides of the conflict, both the North and South perspectives are shown at length. The plot focuses on the cast overcoming the manipulation they face at an international level and occasionally attempting to reconcile their differences to fight an evil greater than either side ever acknowledged, making way for scenarios in which their allegiances are stressed and put to the test.

=== Main ===
The main cast of IRIS, clockwise from top left: Lee Byung-hun, Kim Tae-hee, Jung Joon-ho, Choi Seung-hyun, Kim Seung-woo, and Kim So-yeon. The cast won numerous awards for their contributions to the series.

- Lee Byung-hun as Kim Hyun-jun (South Korea)

A soldier with the South Korean Special Forces, Hyun-jun has floated through life with little attention for the details. Possessing a photographic memory, top athletic ability, and proficiency with most firearms, he has little difficulty distinguishing himself as a member of the NSS. Assuming the code name "TK1" during operations, he is frequently paired with his brother and colleague Jin Sa-woo.

- Kim Tae-hee as Choi Seung-hee (South Korea)

Ranked as a "Team Leader" within the NSS, Seung-hee is an expert profiler that assisted the second-in-command, Park Sang-hyun, with recruiting Kim Hyun-jun and, more directly, Jin Sa-woo. Admired for her beauty and perspicacity, Seung-hee is universally liked within the organization and remains very close with fellow NSS member Yang Jung-in.

- Jung Joon-ho as Jin Sa-woo (South Korea)

A friend that has grown up alongside Hyun-jun, Sa-woo is the more level-headed and responsible of the two. As members of the Special Forces, they often found themselves in fierce competitions, and after joining the NSS, find themselves competing for the affection of Choi Seung-hee. In accordance with Hyun-jun's code name, he becomes known as "TK2".

- Kim Seung-woo as Pak Chol-yong (North Korea)

A seasoned and steadfast supporter of the WPK, Pak Chol-yong is the head of the North Korean security team responsible for escorting and protecting heads of state on diplomatic missions. He first encounters Kim Hyun-jun as they are caught in a political impasse in Hungary—one that leaves Pak and his entire team at the mercy of their superiors should they not resolve the situation quickly in their favor.

- Kim So-yeon as Kim Sun-hwa (North Korea)

Despite being one of very few females to achieve her status, Kim Sun-hwa has gained the trust and acknowledgment of her colleagues in the North Korean security forces. As a subordinate of Pak Chol-yong and a ranking officer in his security outfit, she has great admiration for her superior and harbors deep resentment for the South. She falls in love with Hyun-jun, who showed her mercy.

- Choi Seung-hyun as Vick

A mysterious assassin working for an even more mysterious organization, Vick answers to a man known only as "Mr. Black." Though of apparent Korean descent, his actual origins are unknown and he communicates fluently in both English and Korean. Often, he is responsible for eliminating political targets and retrieving, as well as destroying, sensitive information at the behest of his superiors

=== Supporting ===
==== National Security Service (NSS) ====
The NSS is headed by Baek San (Kim Yeong-cheol), its standing deputy director only in title and the man responsible for the recruiting of Hyun-jun and Sa-woo. The named director of the NSS comes and goes with each change of power in the presidency, but it is the deputy director that oversees the organization. Baek San's motivations for many of his actions are mysterious, occasionally outright inconsistent with that of the general national interests. Due to the very existence of the organization being kept secret, he enjoys a state of personal protection that few others do.

While Baek San oversees the organization, the acting chief director, Park Sang-hyun (Yoon Je-moon), is the general supervisor and runs the daily operations of the NSS. He fabricated the understanding but also intransigent where failures are concerned, often personally dealing with each and every agent. For field assignments, he watches over and commands all missions set domestically.

Many of the NSS agents have close personal ties to one another, and the floor supervisor and head of security resources, Yang Jung-in (Kim Hye-jin), is no exception. She is often viewed as a dependable and accommodating authority figure and remains a very close friend to colleague Choi Seung-Hee.

Being the South's first line of defense against foreign threats, the NSS houses technology unavailable to their sister intelligence agencies. The two primary tech agents, Yang Mi-jung (Hyun Jyu-ni) and Hwang Tae-sung (Kim Dae-jin), are often responsible for ensuring field agents have all that is required to see their missions through. Mi-jung does not meet the expected conventions of someone involved in national intelligence. Given that her sense of fashion and general interests are more contemporary than that of her associates, she often stands out from the others, but her status as the top hacker in Korea has made her irreplaceable. Still, Tae-sung remains the more perdurable of the two and is often instrumental in the success of a number of operations.

The forensics and scientific investigations section is headed by Oh Hyun-ku (Yoon Joo-sang), an eccentric that is the eldest of the general staff. He often exhibits a fatherly relationship with many of the agents, including Mi-jung and Seung-hee.

==== The Blue House ====
Due to the overarching plot of the series involving the disputes inherent to the Korean Peninsula and the intricacies of the foreign relations between the North and South, the Blue House and its primary staff are featured prominently throughout. The candidate that wins the election and assumes office is eventual President of South Korea Cho Myung-ho (Lee Jung-gil). His administration begins with his undertaking the grand task of forwarding talks of reunification between the North and South after witnessing the grim reality that is the struggle between the two nations. With strong ambitions, he leads diplomatic outreaches with the North that no one expected of a candidate so early in his term.

President Cho's chief advisor and head of his cabinet is Jung Jyun-jun (Jung Han-yong), and is one of the few around him that the president feels he can trust with any information, no matter how sensitive it may be. Later in the series, he becomes the only reliable lifeline the president has against the influence of sabotage originating inside and outside the Blue House.

The secretary to the president, Hong Soo-jin (Myung Ji-yun), tends to find herself at odds with the chief advisor. She rarely speaks her mind freely and appears to have allegiances beyond those that are already apparent.

==== Others ====
Given the wide range of countries the characters find themselves in throughout the story, a number of recurring characters arise from countries outside of Korea.

Early in the series, Hyun-jun and Seung-hee encounter a young Japanese schoolgirl while in Akita by the name of Yuki (Karen Miyama). Her family operates one of the tourist traps nearby, and she exhibits affection for Hyun-jun and attempts to find herself in his company as much as possible. Later, it is Hyun-jun that needs her, as Yuki and her family help him when he needs them most.

When Hyun-jun finds himself tangled in a political web while in Japan, he crosses paths with Eriko Sato (Yuko Fueki). A Japanese woman with the country's national intelligence agency, Sato is charged with investigating foreign threats that find themselves on Japanese soil.

== Production ==
=== Development ===
Based on the general concept of the 1999 film Shiri, Iris was first revealed in 2008 by its production company Taewon Entertainment and attracted wide attention due to its record budget and star power. Kang Je-gyu, the director of Shiri, was involved with initially developing the project for television, which would later be directed by Kim Kyu-tae and Yang Yun-ho.

Written by Kim Hyun-jun, Jo Gyu-won, and Kim Jae-un, the series began pre-production without the backing of a Korean broadcaster in an attempt to spark a bidding war amongst potential suitors.

On April 18, 2008, it was announced that Lee Byung-hun had been cast in the lead role. It was to be Lee's first television role since 2003 after a five-year hiatus to focus on film roles, including the 2009 film G.I. Joe: The Rise of Cobra, which had been filming at the time of the announcement. Lee's salary was the third highest in the history of Korean television dramas, amounting to ₩100 million ($90,000 USD) per episode and was six times greater than that of the Korean industry guideline. His salary was inclusive of an overhead deal of ₩1.5 billion won (US$1.35 million) in guarantees due to his namesake drawing potential investors, particularly in Japan, and opportunities in other overseas markets.

The production company announced on June 24 that Big Bang member T.O.P would be starring alongside Lee as an assassin and the recurring antagonist of the series. It was announced on October 10 that Kim Tae-hee, known for her roles in Forbidden Love and Stairway to Heaven, had been cast as the female lead in the series. Like Lee, she had not worked in television for several years and had been working in film prior to accepting the role.

Pre-production continued on Iris as it drew increasing attention not only in Korea but also in Japan due to Lee's involvement. Kim Seung-woo and Jung Joon-ho were also cast as the head of the North Korean security team and Kim Hyun-jun's lifelong friend, respectively.

The large budget and notable talent for the project made it difficult for the production company to secure directors willing to take on the series, causing 2009 to begin with a brief stir of media attention. Shortly thereafter, Taewon announced that the search was over and Kim Kyu-tae and Yang Yun-ho would be helming the series. Simultaneously, KBS was announced as the South Korean broadcaster. Later in the month, on February 19, Kim So-yeon was cast as a North Korean agent.

=== Filming and promotion ===
The first filmed scenes of Iris were shot in Akita, Japan on March 10, 2009. Lee Byung-hun's popularity in Japan caused the series and its production to gain immediate notability in the country. Lee's filming was often shadowed by fans, beginning with thousands greeting him at Akita Airport upon his arrival. Due to several pivotal moments of the series being filmed in the prefecture, Akita soon experienced a surge of Korean tourists going on tours tailored to followers of the show. The crew went on to shoot in Japan for three weeks and left the country on March 28.

With its unprecedented budget, IRIS was able to pioneer several firsts for Korean television dramas, particularly with its large scale action sequences. Throughout filming, the actors were often responsible for filming their own stunts and action sequences, including Lee Byung-hun jumping from the 130-meter-tall (430 ft) Tamagawa Dam in Semboku, Akita. To prepare for the demanding physical requirements of the series, several members of the primary cast, including Kim Tae-hee, underwent special training to lend authenticity to the action. During a break in filming, Lee Byung-hun appeared at the 2009 Cannes Film Festival in support of the production in May. A press conference was also held later in the month with the entire finalized cast of the series.

The next international shoot commenced on June 9 in Hungary. Shot in and around Budapest and other locales, the filming lasted for one month before the cast and crew returned to Korea. In late July, it was announced that IRIS would air on Wednesdays and Thursdays on KBS2, for premiere on October 14. Filming continued throughout the year and, on October 5, a production press conference was held for the Korean and world media just over a week prior to the series premiere.

Filming continued after the premiere of the series. On November 29, 2009, the filming crew took over a section of Sejong-ro at Gwanghwamun Plaza, Seoul for twelve hours to film lengthy gunfight scenes. The five lanes along the plaza in front of the Sejong Center for the Performing Arts were closed to traffic for filming from 07:00 to 19:00. This marks the first time the Seoul Metropolitan Government has granted permission to block traffic along the Plaza for filming as a part of Government's plans to promote the city's major tourist attractions.

== Media ==
IRIS Original Soundtrack

Soundtrack album by Yi Dong-jun & Choe Seong-gown
- Released: November 13, 2009
- Genre: Soundtrack
- Length: 52:48
- Label: Mnet Media

=== Music ===
The IRIS original soundtrack was released as a 16-track album on November 13, 2009, with music composed by Yi Dong-jun and Choe Seong-gwon. The soundtrack contained a number of the vocal themes used in the series, including those by Baek Ji-young, Shin Seung-hun, and BigBang.

On December 24, a limited edition was released as a two-disc set with a 76-page photobook. The first disc contained ten vocal themes, four of which were used in the second half of the series and not included on the original release. The second disc collected fifteen instrumentals used as backdrops during the show's run, including four not on the previous collection.

In the week preceding the premiere of Iris on Japanese television, it was announced that BigBang would be contributing an all-new ballad to be inserted into the TBS airings. Titled "Tell Me Goodbye," the song was released as a single in the country on June 9, 2010, and was available in both a CD and a CD & DVD edition.

Coinciding with the initial broadcast of the series in Japan, a deluxe soundtrack box-set was released on May 26, 2010 by Being Inc. In addition to featuring thirteen vocal themes and nineteen instrumentals on two discs, the release includes a 72-page photobook adapted from the previous Korean release and a DVD of music videos used to promote the series. Those featured were "Hallelujah" by BigBang, "Don't Forget" by Baek Ji-young, and "Love of Iris" by Shin Seung-hun.

Korean standard edition track listing
No.	Title	Lyrics	Music	Artist	Length
1.	"Don't Forget (잊지말아요)"	Choi Gab-won	Kim Do-hun, Lee Hyun-seung	Baek Ji-young	4:05
2.	"Love of Iris"	Yang Jae-seon	Shin Seung-hun, Lee Hyun-seung	Shin Seung-hun	3:47
3.	"Dreaming Dream (꿈을 꾸다)"	Lee Hyun-seung, Kim Tae-woo	Lee Hyun-seung	Kim Tae-woo	4:22
4.	"Hallelujah (할렐루야)"	G-Dragon	Teddy, G-Dragon	Big Bang	3:14
5.	"Empty"	Kim Soo-jin	Kim Soo-jin	Juni	3:52
6.	"Main Title"		Yi Dong-jun		2:26
7.	"Mission of Destiny"		Yi Dong-jun		2:27
8.	"Assassination"		Yi Dong-jun		3:06
9.	"Fight Factory"		Yi Dong-jun		2:17
10.	"Destiny Love"		Yi Dong-jun		4:01
11.	"Pretty Love"		Yi Dong-jun		3:50
12.	"Sad Love"		Yi Dong-jun		2:53
13.	"Hard Day"		Yi Dong-jun		2:33
14.	"Midnight Run"		Choe Seong-gwon		2:46
15.	"Bullets"		Choe Seong-gwon		3:17
16.	"No Way Out"		Choe Seong-gwon		2:20

Korean limited edition track listing (Disc 1)
No.	Title	Artist	Length
1.	"Dreaming Dream (꿈을 꾸다)"	Kim Tae-woo	4:22
2.	"Don't Forget (잊지 말아요)"	Baek Ji-young	4:05
3.	"Can I Love (사랑하면 안되나요)"	Seo In-young	3:41
4.	"Hallelujah (할렐루야)"	Big Bang	3:14
5.	"Love Of Iris"	Shin Seung-hun	3:49
6.	"True Love... (사랑 참...)"	December	3:31
7.	"How Do I Hold Back the Tears (어떻게 눈물 참는지)"	Lee Jung-hyun	4:36
8.	"Good for Everybody (너라서 좋았다)"	Ji-hoon	3:47
9.	"Empty"	Juni	3:52
10.	"Doraolsun Eomnayo (돌아올순 없나요)"	December	3:44

Korean limited edition track listing (Disc 2)
No.	Title	Music	Length
1.	"Main Title"	Yi Dong-jun	2:26
2.	"Mission of Destiny"	Yi Dong-jun	2:27
3.	"Assassination"	Yi Dong-jun	3:06
4.	"Fight Factory"	Yi Dong-jun	2:17
5.	"Destiny Love"	Yi Dong-jun	4:01
6.	"Pretty Love"	Yi Dong-jun	3:50
7.	"Sad Love"	Yi Dong-jun	2:53
8.	"Sad Love (Guitar Version)"	Yi Dong-jun	2:10
9.	"Chase 140"	Yi Dong-jun	1:42
10.	"Chase 150"	Yi Dong-jun	2:07
11.	"Tension 80-2"	Yi Dong-jun	5:08
12.	"Hard Day"	Yi Dong-jun	2:33
13.	"Midnight Run"	Choe Seong-gwon	2:46
14.	"Bullets"	Choe Seong-gwon	3:17
15.	"No Way Out"	Choe Seong-gwon	2:20

Japanese deluxe box-set edition (Disc 1)
No.	Title	Artist	Length
1.	"Stay"	Lee Byung-hun	3:52
2.	"Dreaming Dream (夢を見る)"	Kim Tae-woo	4:22
3.	"Don't Forget (忘れないで)"	Baek Ji-young	4:05
4.	"Can I Love (愛してはいけませんか)"	Seo In-young	3:41
5.	"Hallelujah (ハレルヤ)"	Big Bang	3:14
6.	"Love of Iris"	Shin Seung-hun	3:47
7.	"True Love... (愛って本当に...)"	December	3:31
8.	"How Do I Hold Back the Tears (どうやって涙をこらえるのか)"	Lee Jung-hyun	4:36
9.	"Good for Everybody (君でよかった)"	Ji-hoon	3:47
10.	"Empty"	Juni	3:52
11.	"Doraolsun Eomnayo (戻れないでしょうか)"	December	3:44
12.	"Endless Road (Japanese Version)"	Lee Byung-hun	4:18
13.	"Endless Road (Korean Version)"	Lee Byung-hun	4:15

Japanese deluxe box-set edition (Disc 2)
No.	Title	Music	Length
1.	"Main Title"	Yi Dong-jun	2:26
2.	"Mission of Destiny"	Yi Dong-jun	2:27
3.	"Assassination"	Yi Dong-jun	3:06
4.	"Fight Factory"	Yi Dong-jun	2:17
5.	"Destiny Love"	Yi Dong-jun	4:01
6.	"Pretty Love"	Yi Dong-jun	3:50
7.	"Sad Love"	Yi Dong-jun	2:53
8.	"Sad Love (Piano Version)"	Yi Dong-jun	2:11
9.	"First Love"	Yi Dong-jun	2:18
10.	"Chase 140"	Yi Dong-jun	1:42
11.	"Chase 150"	Yi Dong-jun	2:07
12.	"Tension 80"	Yi Dong-jun	0:53
13.	"Tension 80-2"	Yi Dong-jun	5:08
14.	"Mystery 70"	Yi Dong-jun	2:02
15.	"Big"	Yi Dong-jun	3:44
16.	"Hard Day"	Yi Dong-jun	2:33
17.	"Midnight Run"	Choe Seong-gwon	2:46
18.	"Bullets"	Choe Seong-gwon	3:17
19.	"No Way Out"	Choe Seong-gwon	2:20

=== Novelization and graphic novel ===
A two-volume novelization was published prior to and during the show's initial run. Written by Chae Woo-do, the first volume was published on October 12, 2009, two days prior to the show's premiere on KBS. The second volume was published exactly one month later on November 12, and, unlike its predecessor, did not follow the eventual plot of the television series.

In July 2010, it was confirmed that an IRIS graphic novel was in the works for a Fall 2011 release. Reports of the project, which features the likenesses of Lee Byung-hun and Kim Tae-hee, date back to August 2009, prior to the series airing. Launching first in Japan and later in Korea, the graphic novel retained the relationship between the male and female leads but deviates from the scenarios featured in the original story.

=== Home video ===
Iris was released on Region 3 DVD in South Korea on February 12, 2010 in an 8-disc set, complete with English subtitles. The first pressing included a 50-page photobook with previously unpublished photographs from the production of the series.

Earlier, on November 27, 2009, a 100-minute making-of documentary titled IRIS Navigate DVD was released for the Japanese market, documenting the filming of the series in Hungary, Japan, and Korea.

The full series is set to be released over two uncut DVD box-sets in Japan. The first was announced for a July 2, 2010 release and retails for 19,950 yen (US$212), with the second following on September 15. On August 3, 2010, the first volume was released on Blu-ray with the second set to follow on October 20, both priced at 25,200 yen (US$268). The first pressings included replica NSS ID cards, a postcard set, a bonus disc, and a 24-page data booklet.

In addition, two behind-the-scenes production diary box-sets began to be issued in Japan beginning June 16, 2010. The first follows the cast's filming in Akita and Hungary while the second tracks their work in Korea and was released September 15.

== Reception ==
IRIS premiered on October 14, 2009 to strong ratings and went on to become one of the most critically and commercially successful series of the year, earning numerous awards for its actors and production.

The series ended its initial run on December 17, 2009. KBS announced that an IRIS special would be aired the following week, on December 22. The special contained extensive behind-the-scenes footage from the filming in Hungary, Japan, and Korea, along with numerous interviews with the cast and crew.

On January 28, 2010, it was reported that the distribution rights for the Japanese market were purchased by TBS for a record 400 million yen (US$4.2 million). The station began airing the Japanese-dubbed version during primetime—a first for a South Korean-produced drama series in the country—on April 21, 2010 with numerous acting talents providing the voiceovers, including Tatsuya Fujiwara as Kim Hyun-jun. The two-hour premiere drew TBS's highest ratings for the day and doubled the station's usual average for the timeslot. The airing had been preceded by a promotional blitz with stars Lee Byung-hun and Kim Tae-hee appearing on numerous Japanese programs, in addition to billboards and posters being placed throughout Tokyo.

Publicity for IRIS in Japan was strong from its premiere and beyond. In late May 2010, a set of two concert events billed as dramatic live stage shows drew sold-out crowds that amounted to over 60,000 attendees. The concerts were a combination of live interviews with much of the primary cast, re-enactments of pivotal scenes from the series, and performances by the musical acts featured in its soundtrack. Broadcaster TBS revealed in June 2010 that airings of the series on its satellite offerings had broken records daily, doubling the ratings of its previous programs. Such was the influence of the series that flights between Seoul and Akita that had been nearing decommission were revitalized as a result of mounting tourist interest. Due to the commerce generated for Akita prefecture as a result of Iris having filmed there, local governments in Japan began competing for interest from producers in order to solicit tourists with future installments of the series.

A producer with Taewon Entertainment, the production company behind Iris, was quoted on May 6, 2010 as saying they were in negotiations toward exporting the series to American television for broadcast on a major network. The episode count would be reduced from the original twenty down to twelve and, should the deal go through, would mark the first time a South Korean-produced drama program was aired on a major television network in the United States.

=== Ratings ===
Episode #	Original broadcast date	Average audience share			
Episode #	Original broadcast date	TNmS Ratings		AGB Nielsen	
Episode #	Original broadcast date	Nationwide	Seoul National Capital Area	Nationwide	Seoul National Capital Area
1	14 October 2009	24.5%	25.4%	20.3%	21.3%
2	15 October 2009	25.3%	26.1%	23.0%	24.7%
3	21 October 2009	27.9%	29.3%	25.9%	27.5%
4	22 October 2009	26.2%	27.2%	23.8%	25.2%
5	28 October 2009	29.6%	30.3%	26.7%	28.1%
6	29 October 2009	28.9%	29.8%	27.7%	29.0%
7	4 November 2009	30.7%	31.1%	27.8%	27.9%
8	5 November 2009	30.9%	31.9%	27.1%	27.4%
9	11 November 2009	32.7%	33.3%	28.2%	28.9%
10	12 November 2009	33.7%	34.5%	28.6%	29.7%
11	18 November 2009	34.1%	34.9%	29.3%	30.1%
12	19 November 2009	31.3%	32.3%	28.0%	29.9%
13	25 November 2009	32.0%	32.5%	29.6%	31.0%
14	26 November 2009	32.5%	33.4%	27.4%	27.7%
15	2 December 2009	34.7%	35.5%	30.6%	32.5%
16	3 December 2009	35.7%	36.5%	31.3%	32.8%
17	9 December 2009	37.2%	39.1%	32.8%	34.0%
18	10 December 2009	35.7%	37.8%	32.2%	32.9%
19	16 December 2009	35.0%	36.4%	31.6%	33.2%
20	17 December 2009	39.9%	41.8%	35.5%	37.3%
Average viewership		31.9%	33.0%	28.4%	29.6%
Special	23 December 2009	12.0%	12.8%	10.0%	10.5%

=== Awards and nominations ===
Year	Award	Category	Recipient	Result
2009	KBS Drama Awards	Grand Prize (Daesang)	Lee Byung-hun	Won
2009	KBS Drama Awards	Top Excellence Award, Actor	Lee Byung-hun	Nominated
2009	KBS Drama Awards	Top Excellence Award, Actor	Kim Seung-woo	Nominated
2009	KBS Drama Awards	Top Excellence Award, Actress	Kim Tae-hee	Nominated
2009	KBS Drama Awards	Excellence Award, Actor in a Mid-length Drama	Jung Joon-ho	Won
2009	KBS Drama Awards	Excellence Award, Actor in a Mid-length Drama	Kim Seung-woo	Won
2009	KBS Drama Awards	Excellence Award, Actor in a Mid-length Drama	Lee Byung-hun	Nominated
2009	KBS Drama Awards	Excellence Award, Actress in a Mid-length Drama	Kim Tae-hee	Won
2009	KBS Drama Awards	Excellence Award, Actress in a Mid-length Drama	Kim So-yeon	Nominated
2009	KBS Drama Awards	Best Supporting Actor	Yoon Joo-sang	Won
2009	KBS Drama Awards	Best New Actor	T.O.P	Nominated
2009	KBS Drama Awards	Netizen Award, Actor	Lee Byung-hun	Won
2009	KBS Drama Awards	Popularity Award, Actress	Kim So-yeon	Won
2009	KBS Drama Awards	Best Couple Award	Lee Byung-hun and Kim Tae-hee	Won
2010	46th Baeksang Arts Awards	Best Drama	IRIS	Won
2010	46th Baeksang Arts Awards	Best Director (Television)	Yang Yun-ho and Kim Kyu-tae	Nominated
2010	46th Baeksang Arts Awards	Best Actor (Television)	Lee Byung-hun	Won
2010	46th Baeksang Arts Awards	Best Actress (Television)	Kim Tae-hee	Nominated
2010	46th Baeksang Arts Awards	Best Actress (Television)	Kim So-yeon	Nominated
2010	3rd Korea Drama Awards	Best Drama	IRIS	Nominated
2010	3rd Korea Drama Awards	Best Production Director in a Miniseries	Kim Kyu-tae	Won
2010	3rd Korea Drama Awards	Best Actor	Lee Byung-hun	Nominated
2010	3rd Korea Drama Awards	Best Actress	Kim Tae-hee	Nominated
2010	3rd Korea Drama Awards	Best Producer	Chung Tae-won	Won
2010	5th Seoul International Drama Awards	Outstanding Korean Actor	Lee Byung-hun	Won

== Spin-off ==
A spin-off series to begin filming in 2010 and premiered later in the same year was announced following the success of Iris. Starring Jung Woo-sung, Cha Seung-won, Soo Ae, Choi Si-won and Lee Ji-ah, the series Athena: Goddess of War was filmed on location in a number of overseas locations, including Italy, New Zealand, Japan, and the United States. Production head of Taewon Entertainment, Chung Tae-won, confirmed in an interview on May 31, 2010 that Iris and Athena would be set in the same universe, allowing for crossovers between characters of the two franchises. Filming on Athena was projected to last over five months, with production commencing in Korea in June before moving to Italy in July. The series premiered December 13, 2010 on SBS and saw its finale on February 21, 2011. Shortly before the series ended, the head of production was quoted as expressing interest in producing sequels to continue Athena and further connect it to other entries in the franchise.

== Sequel ==
A true sequel series, tentatively titled IRIS 2, was originally announced for October 2011. At the time of announcement, pre-production was underway and reports estimated filming on the sequel was expected to commence in March 2011. Representatives from Taewon Productions stated in April 2010 that they expected original stars Lee Byung-hun, Kim Tae-hee, and Kim So-yeon to be cast in the sequel. Later, just prior to the finale of Athena being broadcast, lead producer Chung Tae-won confirmed that he anticipated IRIS 2 to be in production in time for a fall 2012 premiere. Concurrently, it was reported that the proposed series remained in pre-production with the scriptwriters in the process of crafting the story. Chung also revealed that no casting decisions had been made and that the writing staff were preparing two potential versions of the series as a result—one featuring the full original cast and another that would see the return of only a select few. The leads of the original series, Lee Byung-hun and Kim Tae-hee, were officially confirmed to ultimately not be reprising their roles for the sequel on August 24, 2012.

On September 13, 2012, it was announced that veteran film and television actor Jang Hyuk had been offered the lead in IRIS 2. Actress Lee Da-hae was confirmed on September 18 as being eyed for the female lead in the series, which would reunite her with co-star Jang Hyuk from their work on 2010s award-winning historical series Chuno. In addition to confirming the two leads, on September 19, several additions were made to the cast, with Kim Seung-woo, Kim Min-jong, Kim Yeong-cheol, Im Soo-hyang, and Oh Yeon-soo all being confirmed for the series. Kim Seung-woo has signed on to reprise his role of North Korean agent Park Cheol-young previously featured in Iris and Athena, while Kim Min-jong is set to return as defector Kim Gi-soo from Athena and Kim Yeong-cheol is to come back as the villain from the original series, Baek San. Several others, including Kang Ji-young from South Korean pop group Kara, Yoon Doo-joon of boy band B2ST, and Lee Joon from MBLAQ were all also discussed for roles, along with American actor Daniel Henney.

Iris 2 premiered on February 13, 2013.

== Feature film ==
The movie saw its theatrical premiere in Japan on January 8, 2011 under the title IRIS: The Last.
