= Iris: The Movie =

- Official release poster
- Hangul: 아이리스: 더 무비
- RR: Airiseu: deo mubi
- MR: Airisŭ: tŏ mubi
- Directed by: Yang Yun-ho; Kim Kyu-tae
- Written by: Kim Jae-eun; Jo Gyu-won; Kim Hyeon-jun
- Produced by: Kim Jong-hyun; Shin Ye-rim; Jeong Tae-won; Baek Jin-dong
- Starring: Lee Byung-hun; Kim Tae-hee; Jung Joon-ho
- Cinematography: Kim Cheon-seok
- Music by: Lee Dong-jun
- Production company: Taewon Entertainment
- Distributed by: Finecut; Kadokawa Pictures
- Release dates: March 21, 2010 (Hong Kong International Film Festival); November 22, 2010 (South Korea)
- Running time: 118 minutes
- Country: South Korea
- Language: Korean

Iris: The Movie (Korean: 아이리스: 더 무비; RR: Airiseu: deo mubi) is a 2010 South Korean spy action film. It is the first Korean production that shot a television drama and feature-length film simultaneously (Kim Kyu-tae was in charge of the TV segments, and Yang Yun-ho in charge of the film segments), the television series Iris was a hit when it aired on KBS2 in 2009. Iris: The Movie is a feature-length edit of the 20 episodes, along with additional footage shot specifically for the theatrical version and a different ending.

The film premiered at the 34th Hong Kong International Film Festival on March 21, 2010. It did not receive a theatrical run in South Korea, but was instead released on November 22, 2010, through IPTV, cable TV, satellite PPV, and Cine21 online portals. Due to Lee Byung-hun's Japanese fanbase, distributor Kadokawa Pictures released the film theatrically in Japan on January 8, 2011, under the alternate title Iris - The Last.

== Plot ==
The Korean peninsula is constantly under political and military tension, especially with the North Korean nuclear issue. To avoid a second Korean War, a secret black ops agency known as the National Security Service (NSS) protects South Korea's national security by training special agents who would use any means to fulfill their mission. They officially do not exist and are not acknowledged or protected by the government. Although they are trained to be cold-blooded killers, there is one taboo they cannot avoid: love. Hyun-jun and Sa-woo were close friends and rivals in the 707th Special Mission Battalion, and both are recruited into the NSS and quickly become the best of the best. Each with different secret assignments, they soon take different paths in life. In a world of conspiracy and betrayal, they both fall for Seung-hee, the beautiful but lethal profiling specialist at NSS. Kim Hyun-ju's mission is to dismantle IRIS and prevent a nuclear attack on Seoul.

== Cast ==
- Lee Byung-hun as Kim Hyun-jun
- Kim Tae-hee as Choi Seung-hee
- Jung Joon-ho as Jin Sa-woo
- Kim So-yeon as Kim Seon-hwa
- Kim Seung-woo as Park Chun-young
- Choi Seung-hyun as Vick
- Kim Yeong-cheol as Baek San
