= Jung Han-yong =

South Korean actor

- Born: Chung Han-yong (정한용); June 22, 1954 (age 72); South Korea
- Occupation: Actor

Jung Han-yong (Korean: 정한용, born June 22, 1954) is a veteran South Korean actor. He has appeared in many television series, including 2009's Iris. In 1983 he won the Baeksang Arts Awards for Best New Actor for his performance in the series Ordinary People (보통 사람들, Botong saramdeul). He appeared in more than 50 television series and movies between 1980 and 2013.

== Theater ==
- The Playboy of the Western World (2022) - Director

== Election results ==
Year	Elections	Constituency	Political party	Votes (%)	Results
1996	15th National Assembly General Election	Guro A (Seoul)	NCNP	35,345 (39.61%)	Won
2000	16th National Assembly General Election	Yeonsu (Incheon)	ULD	13,173 (14.01%)	Defeated (3rd)
