= List of Let's Go! Dream Team Season 2 episodes =

The following is a list of episodes of the South Korean reality-variety show Let's Go! Dream Team Season 2, broadcast on KBS2 every Sunday from 2009 to 2016.

== 2009 ==
Episode #	Date Aired	Cast	Opposing Team	Event(s)	Comments
Pilot	September 13, 2009	Jo Sungmo; Byun Woo-min; Choi Minho (Shinee); Song Joong-ki; Lee Junho (2PM); Danny Ahn	Republic of Korea Coast Guard Team: Lee Hyung-kyu; Choi Tae-geun; Kim In-su; Lee Sang-jin; Lee Du-yong; Han Hyung-ju	Game 1: 100m Run; Game 2: High Jump; Main event: Scary Great White Shark	Draw; Special Appearance: Kara
1	October 25, 2009	Jo Sungmo; Choi Minho (Shinee); Eunhyuk (Super Junior); Danny Ahn; Lee Sang-in; Lee Wan	National Taekwondo Team: Shin Ho-chul; Park Hyung-woo; Kim Kyeong-seok; Choi Jin-hyeok; Lee Gi-sung; Lee Jeong-woo	Game 1: 100m Run; Game 2: Vaulting; Main event: Ride! Taekwon V	1st loss; Choi Jin-hyeok wins (2.50 m)
2	November 1, 2009	Jo Sungmo; Choi Minho (Shinee); Eunhyuk (Super Junior); Lee Sang-in; Tei; Hong Seo-beom	B-Boy World Champion Team: Ha Hwi-dong (Snake); Park Jae-min (Snipa); Kim Ki-heon (Differ); Kim Hong-yeol (Hong 10); Kim Heon-joon (Skim); Kim Heon-woo (Wing)	Game 1: Sit-Ups; Game 2: High Jump; Main event: Vinyl Jump Battle	2nd loss; First 2nd consecutive loss
3	November 8, 2009	Lee Sang-in; Choi Minho (Shinee); Shin Jung-hwan; Jo Dong-hyuk; Ryan (Paran); Chung Lim	Korea Military Academy Team: Yoon Dae-hwa; Kim Hyeon-seob; Kim Bi-baek; Kim Hee-hun; Kim Bong-jin; Jeong Hyung-ok	Dream car: Memories 369 Games; Main event: Mission Star Gate	1st draw
4	November 15, 2009	Hong Seo-neom; Lee Sang-in; Choi Minho (Shinee); Danny Ahn; Kim Hyun-joong (SS501); Run	North Jeolla Province Team: Cho Tae-kyeong; Kim Du-cheol; Hong Hyeon-hee; Im Jin-woo; Park Sang-hyeon; Kim Ki-ok	Dream car: Horse Vaulting; Main event: Escape the Barriage	1st win
5	November 22, 2009	Hong Seo-beom; Lee Sang-in; Eunhyuk (Super Junior); Danny Ahn; Seo Ji-seok; Chung Lim	Stunt Action Actors Team: Kwon Ji-hoon; Kwak Jin-seok; Kang Young-mok; Kwon Hyeok; Jang Young-ju; Im Joon-il	Dream car: Noon-chi Game; Main event: Survival Action Race	3rd loss
6	November 29, 2009	Eunhyuk (Super Junior); Choi Minho (Shinee); Danny Ahn; Park Hyun-bin; Jung Suk-won; Taegoon	National Extreme Bike Team: Oh In-hwan; Lee Yoon-ho; Kwon Dong-kyeong; Jang Jae-yoon; Seo Ik-joon; Jang Jun-won	Game 1: Dream car: Noon-chi Game; Main event: Extreme High-Altitude Escape	2nd win
7	December 6, 2009	Eunhyuk (Super Junior); Choi Minho (Shinee); Danny Ahn; Lee Hyuk-jae; Run; Chung Lim	Kia Tigers Representative Team: Lee Jong-beom; Jae Weong Seo; Kim Sang-hyeon; Na Ji-wan; Yang Hyeon-jong; An Chi-hong	Dream car: Noon-chi Game; Catch Ball; Main event: Sliding Run and Hit	Kia Tigers Special; 3rd win; First 2nd consecutive win
8	December 13, 2009	Eunhyuk (Super Junior); Choi Minho (Shinee); Danny Ahn; Lee Hyuk-jae; Run; Chung Lim	Kia Tigers Representative Team: Lee Jong-beom; Jae Weong Seo; Kim Sang-hyeon; Na Ji-wan; Yang Hyeon-jong; An Chi-hong	Strike Showdown; Dream car: Gather ! Ddaeng Ddaeng Ddaeng; Main event: Survical Home Run Race	Kia Tigers Special; 4th loss
9	December 20, 2009	Choi Minho (Shinee); Eunhyuk (Super Junior); Danny Ahn; Kim Sung-soo (Cool); Sangchu (Mighty Mouth); Jung Suk-won	119 Emergency Team: Shin Sang-kyu; Bang Kyeong-ho; Lee Seong-hoon; Shin Dong-gook; Ham Noori; Choi Jong-gook	High Jump; Dream car: Noon-chi Game; Main event: Fireball	Special Appearance: LPG; 2nd draw
10	December 27, 2009	Choi Minho (Shinee); Danny Ahn; Kim Sung-soo (Cool); Go Joo-won; Song Joong-ki; Run	UBC Ice Hockey Team: Jeff; Jason; Max; Carson; Trevor; Jeff; Hamilton	Jeeptrack Experience; Game 1: Ice Hockey; Main event: Survival Race Super Tank	2010 Winter Olympics in Vancouver, British Columbia, Canada Special Part 1; 4th win

== 2010 ==
Episode #	Date Aired	Cast	Opposing Team	Event(s)	Comments
11	January 3, 2010	Choi Minho (Shinee); Danny Ahn; Kim Sung-soo (Cool); Go Joo-won; Song Joong-ki; Run	"Team Canada" Representative Team: Yoo Jin-woo; Kim Byeong-gun; Cho Young-jun; Hwang Sang-hyun; Im Jin-hwan; Kwon Myung; Jeong Ho-tae	Figure Skating; Game 1: "Dog" Sledding Experience; Main event: Upgrade Run and Jump	2010 Winter Olympics in Vancouver, British Columbia, Canada Special Part 2; 5th loss
12	January 10, 2010	Choi Minho (Shinee); Danny Ahn; Kim Sung-soo (Cool); Go Joo-won; Song Joong-ki; Run	Whistler Ski Instructor Team: Chris; Max; Bob; Scott; Justin; James	Game 1: Peak-to-Peak; Game 2: Curling; Main event: Snow Ride Catch	2010 Winter Olympics in Vancouver, British Columbia, Canada Special Part 3; 5th win
13	January 17, 2010	Choi Minho (Shinee); Danny Ahn; Kim Sung-soo (Cool); Go Joo-won; Song Joong-ki; Run	Whistler Public Relations Representative Team: Clint; Bram; TJ; Andy; Terry; Tony; Hennessy	Game 1: Bungee Jumping; Game 2: Suspension Bridge; Main event: Ultimate Clash Flying Snowman	2010 Winter Olympics in Vancouver, British Columbia, Canada Part 4; 6th win; 2nd consecutive win
14	January 24, 2010	Choi Minho (Shinee); Danny Ahn; Sangchu (Mighty Mouth); Won Ki-joon; Han Min-kwan	Daegu FC Pro-soccer Team: Cho Jun-ho; Jang Nam-seok; Bang Dae-jong; Lee Seul-gi; Choi Ho-jeong; Kim Min-kyun	Pre-match game: High Jump; Dream car: Main event:	Daegu FC Athletes Special; 7th win; First 3rd consecutive win
15	January 31, 2010	Choi Minho (Shinee); Danny Ahn; Sangchu (Mighty Mouth); Lee Hong-gi (F.T. Island); Choi Phillip; Kim Jin	KBS Men's Announcer Team: Kim Hyeon-ok; Kim Ki-man; Choi Dong-seok; Jun Hyun-moo; Oh Uon-jong; Kim Seung-hwi	Pre-match game: Vaulting; Dream car: Main event: Escape Snow Iceberg Race	KBS Men's Announcer Special; 8th win; First 4th consecutive win
16	February 7, 2010	Choi Minho (Shinee); Eunhyuk (Super Junior); Danny Ahn; Lee Joon (MBLAQ); Ryu Sang-ok	Korea Expressway Corporation Representative Team: Go Gun-woong; Park Sang-ui; Kim Tae-won; Im Hyeon-deok; Kang Beom-soon; Geum Sang-ho	Pre-match game: Real Sliding; Dream car: Main event: Infinite Sprint Highway Star	9th win; First 5th consecutive win; Special Appearance: MBLAQ
17	February 14, 2010	Eunhyuk (Super Junior); Brian Joo; Danny Ahn; Jung Yong-hwa (CNBLUE); Hong Seo-beom	Corail Tourism Development Team Representative Team: Kang Jun-su; Go Won-kyu; Park Chang-min; Lee Ju-hyeon; Yoo Jong-woo; Nam Taek-kwon	Pre-match game: Rail Bike; Dream car: Main event: Train Rail Jump	10th win; First 6th consecutive win
18	February 21, 2010	Tiffany (Girls' Generation); Sunny (Girls' Generation); Kim Hyo-yeon (Girls' Generation); Seung-yeon (Kara); Nicole Jung (Kara); Narsha (Brown Eyed Girls); Gain (Brown Eyed Girls); Kim Eun-jung (Jewelry); Ha Joo-yeon (Jewelry); Jun Hyoseong (Secret); Demonstrators/referees: Choi Minho (Shinee); Danny Ahn	n/a	Round 1: 100m Run; Round 2: Cockfight; Round 3: Sit-Ups; Round 4: Horse Vaulting Part 1	Special Appearance: Shinee (Onew, Kim Jonghyun, Lee Taemin); Dream Girls Best: 1st place: Kim Hyo-yeon (62 points); 2nd place: Nicole Jung (55 points); 3rd place: Ha Joo-yeon (48 points)
19	February 28, 2010	Tiffany (Girls' Generation); Sunny (Girls' Generation); Kim Hyo-yeon (Girls' Generation); Seung-yeon (Kara); Nicole Jung (Kara); Narsha (Brown Eyed Girls); Gain (Brown Eyed Girls); Kim Eun-jung (Jewelry); Ha Joo-yeon (Jewelry); Jun Hyoseong (Secret); Demonstrators/referees: Choi Minho (Shinee); Danny Ahn	n/a	Round 4: Horse Vaulting Part 2; Round 5: Zig Zag Buzzer Run; Round 6: Survival Dance Battle; Round 4: Capture The Flag Survival	Special Appearance: Shinee (Onew, Kim Jonghyun, Lee Taemin); Dream Girls Best: 1st place: Kim Hyo-yeon (62 points); 2nd place: Nicole Jung (55 points); 3rd place: Ha Joo-yeon (48 points)
20	March 7, 2010	Choi Minho (Shinee); Eunhyuk (Super Junior); Lee Junho (2PM); Danny Ahn; Sangchu (Mighty Mouth); Lee Hong-gi (F.T. Island)	UFC Martial Arts Team: Yoshihiro Akiyama; Dong Hyun Kim; Yoo Woo-sung; Lee Sang-su; Bae Myung-ho; Kang Kyung-ho	Game 1: Arm Wrestling Showdown; Game 2: Dream car; Main event: Punch Race, Fists Are Coming!	UFC Martial Arts Athlete Special; 11th win; First 7th consecutive win; Lee Junho and Sangchu win (3.80 m)
21	March 14, 2010	Danny Ahn; Choi Minho (Shinee); Lee Junho (2PM); Sangchu (Mighty Mouth)	n/a	High Jump Challenge	Dream Team 1st Project; Jo Sungmo's previous record: 2.25m; Sangchu's record: 2.5m; Choi Minho's record: 2.4m
22	March 21, 2010	Danny Ahn & Jin Bora; Choi Minho (Shinee) & Krystal Jung (f(x)); Lee Junho (2PM) & Yoon Ju-hee; Sangchu (Mighty Mouth) & Jessica Jung (Girls' Generation); Brian Joo & Hyoyeon (Girls' Generation); Chun Myung-hoon & Kim Jung-min	n/a	Round 1: Zig Zag Relay Run; Round 2: Ssireum & Passive; Round 3: Couple's Dance Showdown; Round 4: Couple's Vaulting	Couple Dream Team Part 1; 1st place: Choi Minho & Krystal Jung (41 points)
23	March 28, 2010	Eunhyuk (Super Junior); Choi Minho (Shinee); Lee Junho (2PM); Sangchu (Mighty Mouth); Brian Joo; Jung Suk-won; Danny Ahn; Lee Sang-in	n/a	Round 1: Catching The Tail Race; Round 2: Half Pipe Run; Round 3: Sandbag Jump	Special Appearance: Krystal Jung (f(x)); Best Ace: 1st place: Sangchu (65 points); 2nd place: Lee Junho (57 points); 3rd place: Eunhyuk (52 points)
24	March April 4, 2010	Eunhyuk (Super Junior); Choi Minho (Shinee); Lee Junho (2PM); Sangchu (Mighty Mouth); Brian Joo; Jung Suk-won; Danny Ahn; Lee Sang-in	n/a	Round 4: Speed Pull-ups; Round 5: Flying Touch Man; Round 6: Balance Jump; Round 7: Capture The Flag Survival	Special Appearance: Krystal Jung (f(x)); Best Ace: 1st place: Sangchu (65 points); 2nd place: Lee Junho (57 points); 3rd place: Eunhyuk (52 points)
25	April 11, 2010	Danny Ahn; Eunhyuk (Super Junior); Lee Junho (2PM); Choi Minho (Shinee); Sangchu (Mighty Mouth)	n/a	Korea Women's 100m Hurdles	Dream Team 2nd Project; Best record holder: 13.23s; Failed to beat record; 1st place: Sangchu - 13.41s; 2nd place: Lee Junho - 14.75s; 3rd place: Eunhyuk - 15.44s
26	April 25, 2010	Danny Ahn & Kim Yong-pyo (friend); Eunhyuk (Super Junior) & Seo Dong-min (friend); Lee Junho (2PM) & Yoon Yong-seok (friend); Sangchu (Mighty Mouth) & Lee Sang-kwon (brother); Chun Myung-hoon & Chun Myung-joon (brother); Jung Suk-won & Kwon Hyeok (friend)	n/a	Round 1: Desperate Leaning; Round 2: Half Pipe Run Relay; Round 3: 2 vs. 2 cockfight; Round 4: Double Waterjump	Dream Friends Special; 1st place: Jung Suk-won & Kwon Hyeok (46 points); 2nd place: Sangchu & Lee Sang-kwon (43 points); 3rd place: Lee Junho & Yoon Yong-seok (37 points)
27	May 2, 2010	Danny Ahn; Chun Myung-hoon; Lee Junho (2PM); Choi Minho (Shinee); Jinon (F.Cuz)	Gag Concert Team: Lee Soo-geun; Kim Byung-man; Ryu Dam; Park Sang-ho; Heo Kyung-hwan; Yoon Hyung-bin	Pre-match game 1: Pre-match game 2: Face Soccer; Main event: Sliding Water Jump	Gag Concert Special; 3rd draw; Jinon & Kim Byung-man tie at 8m; Undefeated for 8 games
28	May 9, 2010	Chun Myung-hoon & Nana (After School); Lee Junho & Bekah (After School); Choi Minho (Shinee) & Kim Jungah (After School); Go Joo-won & Kahi (After School); Eunhyuk (Super Junior) & Raina (After School); Danny Ahn & Lee Jooyeon (After School)	n/a	Couple game: Manbogi Dance; Round 1: Jump Jump Cow; Round 2: Wind Homerun King; Round 3: Couple's High jump	Couple Dream Team Part 2; Choi Minho & Kim Jungah win (35 points)
29	May 16, 2010	Chu So-young; Hong Soo-ah; Kim Jae-kyung (Rainbow); Hyoyeon (Girls' Generation); Nicole Jung (Kara); Krystal Jung (f(x)); Lee Junho (2PM) (as coach)	KBS Women's Announcer Team: Kim Bo-min; Lee Jeong-min; Park Eun-young; Park Sa-im; Oh Jeong-yeon; Uhm Ji-in; Choi Minho (Shinee) (as coach)	Pre-match game 1: Guessing Game; Pre-match game 2: Dice Wrestling; Main event: KBS Sliding Doors	Women's Dream Team vs. KBS Women's Announcer Team; Women's Dream Team wins
30	May 23, 2010	Record Contenders: Danny Ahn; Lee Junho (2PM); Kim Dong-jun (ZE:A); Choi Minho (Shinee); Sangchu (Mighty Mouth); Cheerleaders: Taemin (Shinee); Shorry J (Mighty Mouth); Chansung (2PM); Kim Yong-pyo; Jung Suk-won; ZE:A; Coaches: Yeo Hong-chul (for Choi Minho); Lee Ju-hyung (for Sangchu); Yoo Ok-ryul (for Danny Ahn, Lee Junho & Kim Dong-jun)	n/a	Horse Vaulting Challenge	Dream Team 3rd Project; Gosu's previous record: 2.7m; Sangchu's record: 2.7m (tied previous record); Choi Minho's record: 2.5m; Kim Dong-jun's record: 2.5m; Danny Ahn's record: 2.4m; Lee Junho's record: 2.4; Yeo Hong-chul's record: 2.8m
31	May 30, 2010	Choi Minho (Shinee); Sangchu (Mighty Mouth); Lee Junho (2PM); Chansung (2PM); Jinon (F.Cuz); Lee Byung-jin	Korea Aviation Team: Min Kyung-il; Lee Hee-sung; Lee Dong-jun; Cho Han-seul; Kim Du-ho; Hwang Jun-ho	Pre-match game: Relay Slam Dunk; Main event: In The Nick Of Time	12th win; Undefeated for 9 games; Sangchu wins (2.8m)
32	June 6, 2010	High Jump Record Holders: Choi Minho (Shinee); Sangchu (Mighty Mouth); Record Contenders: Kim Jungah (After School); Kim Hyo-yeon (Girls' Generation); Nicole Jung (Kara); Krystal Jung (f(x)); Cheerleaders: Seohyun (Girls' Generation); Amber Liu (fx); Luna (fx); Kang Ji-young (Kara); Kahi (After School); Lee Jooyeon (After School); Raina (After School); Bekah (After School); Nana (After School); Lizzy (After School); Coaches: Yeo Hong-chul (for Krystal & Nicole); Yoo Ok-ryul (for Hyoyeon & Jungah)	n/a	Women's High Jump	Dream Team 4th Project; Lee Na-young & Kim Hee-sun's previous record: 1.6m; Krystal Jung's record: 1.95m; Nicole Jung's record: 1.9m; Kim Jungah's record: 1.85m; Kim Hyo-yeon's record: 1.7m
33	June 13, 2010	Choi Minho (Shinee); Eunhyuk (Super Junior); Lee Junho (2PM); Nichkhun (2PM); Lee Byung-jin; Lee Sang-in	Super Junior Team: Leeteuk; Shindong; Choi Si-won; Yesung; Lee Sungmin; Lee Donghae	Pre-match game 1: Relay Slam Dunk (Super Junior Wins); Pre-match game 2: Face Soccer (Super Junior Wins); Main event: Stepping Stone Jump	13th win; Choi Minho Wins (5.50 m); 2nd consecutive win; Undefeated for 10 games
34	June 20, 2010	Danny Ahn; Choi Minho (Shinee); Jung Suk-won; Kim Hyeon-ok; Julien Kang; Kim Dong-jun (ZE:A)	Refugee Representative Team: Ah Ong Jo; Abraham; Somoddu; Jelreke; Deman; Ahnanda	1 vs. 1 cockfight; Pre-match game: Faith Soccer; Main event: Pole Jump	UN World Refugee Day Special; 14th win; 3rd consecutive win; Undefeated for 11 games
35	June 27, 2010	Yang Won-kyeong; Lee Sang-in; Jun Hyun-moo; Danny Ahn; Choi Minho (Shinee); Jinon (F.Cuz)	Gag Concert Team: Lee Soo-geun; Hwang Hyeon-hee; Byun Gisu; Lee Sang-ho; Park Young-jin; Park Seong-gwang	Pre-match game 1: Face Soccer; Pre-match game 2: Relay Archery; Main event: Fly! Waterboard	Gag Concert re-match; 15th win; 4th consecutive win; Undefeated for 12 games; Jinon wins (6.7m)
36	July 4, 2010	Choi Minho (Shinee); Eunhyuk (Super Junior); Lee Changmin (2AM); Lee Byung-jin; Lee Sang-in; Kim Hyeon-ok	Star Trainers' Team: Im Jong-pil; Lee Jae-il; Kim Ji-hoon; Kim Jong-kyeong; Kim Su-chang; CHoi Han-jin	Beach Volleyball; Pre-match game: Underwater cockfight; Main event:	16th win; 5th consecutive win; Undefeated for 13 games; Eunhyuk wins (2.7m)
37	July 11, 2010	Dream Team: Lee Junho (2PM); Sangchu (Mighty Mouth); Hong Seok-chan; Lee Byung-jin; Lee Sang-in; Jinon (F.Cuz); Entertainer's Soccer Team: Im Dae-ho; Kim Jeong-ryul; Jo Young-gu; Lee Young-beom; Yoon Yong-hyun; Lee Jung-yong; KBS Sportscaster Team: Yoo Ji-chul; Kim Hyeon-ok; Kim Ki-man; Jun Hyun-moo; Park Tae-won; Do Kyung-wan; Gag Concert Team: Noh Wo-jin; Kim Dae-hee; Byun Gisu; Song Jun-geun; Yoon Min-sang; Kim Byung-man	n/a	Face Soccer World Cup	1st place: KBS Sportscaster Team; 2nd place: Entertainer's Soccer Team; Eliminated: Dream Team; Eliminated: Gag Concert Team
38	July 18, 2010	Dream Team: Lee Junho (2PM); Sangchu (Mighty Mouth); Hong Seok-chan; Lee Byung-jin; Lee Sang-in; Jinon (F.Cuz); Entertainer's Soccer Team: Im Dae-ho; Kim Jeong-ryul; Jo Young-gu; Lee Young-beom; Yoon Yong-hyun; Lee Jung-yong; KBS Sportscaster Team: Yoo Ji-chul; Kim Hyeon-ok; Kim Ki-man; Jun Hyun-moo; Park Tae-won; Do Kyung-wan; Gag Concert Team: Noh Wo-jin; Kim Dae-hee; Byun Gisu; Song Jun-geun; Yoon Min-sang; Kim Byung-man	n/a	Face Soccer World Cup	1st place: KBS Sportscaster Team; 2nd place: Entertainer's Soccer Team; Eliminated: Dream Team; Eliminated: Gag Concert Team
39	July 25, 2010	Choi Minho (Shinee); Lee Junho (2PM); Lee Joon (MBLAQ); Kim Eli (U-KISS); Lee Byung Jin; Lee Sang In; Hong Kong Dragon Boat Race Challengers: Lee Byung Jin; Lee Sang In; Sangchu (Mighty Mouth); Jinon (F.Cuz); Alexander (U-KISS)	Model Representative Team: Si Ho; Kim Seong Hyun; Cheon Jin Ho; Sang Hwi; Kim Young-kwang (actor); Kim Han Su	Pre-match game 1: Tug of War; Pre-match game 2: Tsunami Race; Main event: Emergency Catch	Summer Special; 6th loss
40	August 1, 2010	Choi Minho (Shinee); Lee Junho (2PM); Eunhyuk (Super Junior); Sangchu (Mighty Mouth); Jinon (F.Cuz); Kim Dong-jun (ZE:A); Jung Suk-won	Former Powerhouse Team: Kim In Su; Choi Jin Hyeok; Kwon Kyeok; Ham Noori; Oh Uon Jong; Lee Dong Jun; Kim Ji Hoon	Pre-match game: Extreme Water Jump; Main event: General Obstacle Race	7th loss; 2nd consecutive loss; Opposing Team's Kim In Su 1st Hall of Fame (1m20.55s)
41	August 8, 2010	Lee Sang In; Lee Byung Jin; Sangchu (Mighty Mouth); Jinon (F.Cuz); Donghae (Super Junior); Tae Min (Shinee); Alexander (U-KISS)	Bounty Pirates Team: Corby; James; Steve; Calvin; Chester; Stuart	Pirate Experience; Pre-match game: Survival Hamster Ball Race Part 1	Hallyu Wave in Hong Kong Part 1; Summer Special; 17th win
42	August 15, 2010	Kim Byung-man; Lee Sang In; Lee Byung Jin; Sangchu (Mighty Mouth); Jinon (F.Cuz); Tae Min (Shinee) - leaves in the middle; Alexander (U-KISS)	Hong Kong's Muay Thai Team: Johnny; Chung Huy Quan; Keith Chung; Matthey Chung; Shun Ji Wai; Sinji Inose	Pre-match game: Survival Hamster Ball Race Part 2; Stepping Stone Jump	Hallyu Wave in Hong Kong Part 2; Summer Special; 18th win; 2nd consecutive win
43	August 22, 2010	Kim Byung-man; Lee Sang In; Lee Byung Jin; Lee Junho (2PM); Sangchu (Mighty Mouth); Jinon (F.Cuz); Alexander (U-KISS)	n/a	Hong Kong World Event: International Dragon Boat Competition	Hallyu Wave in Hong Kong Part 3; Summer Special; Dream Team wins 4th place in Dragon Boat Race and Popularity Award
44	August 29, 2010	Jung Ah (After School); Kim Eun Jung (Jewelry); Kang Eun Bi; Kwak Hyun Hwa; Rana (Nine Muses); NS Yoonji; Bora (Sistar)	World Miss University Team:	Pre-match game: Survival Capture The Flag; Round 1: Hamster Ball Race; Round 2: Water Ssireum; Final: Stepping-Stone Jump	Miss Dream Team wins; Jung Ah wins
45	September 5, 2010	Lee Sang In; Sangchu (Mighty Mouth); Jinon (F.Cuz); Kim Dong Jun (ZE:A); Lee Ju Hyeon; Eli (U-KISS); Bae Jae Joon	Republic of Korea Coast Guard Team: Kim In Su; Choi Tae Geun; Lee Jong Min; Kim Yoon Tae; Park In Ho; Kim Jae Hyeon; Lee Hae Ju	Pre-match game 1: Lifeguard Training; Pre-match game 2: Pair's Swimming; Main event: General Obstacle Race; Vertical Walls; Water Chin-up Bars; Bamboo Forest; Rolling Log; Rope Climbing Jump	Special appearance: Jo Sungmo; Korea Coast Guard Team Re-match; 8th loss; Opposing Team's Lee Jong Min's 1st Hall of Fame
46	September 12, 2010	Lee Sang In; Sangchu (Mighty Mouth); Jinon (F.Cuz); Eli (U-KISS); Kim Dong Jun (ZE:A); Pascal Dior	Comic Martial Arts Team: Jeong Ui Hyeok; Hong Yoon Gab; Yoo Su Ho; Noh Hae Yeong; Seo Sa Rok; Kim Tae Sung; Cho Hyeun Kyu	Audience service game: Relay Slam Dunk; Main event: General Obstacle Race; Chin-up Bar Step; Swing Jump; Spinning Spider Web; Water Chin-up Bars; Cliff Escape	19th win; Sangchu's 1st Hall of Fame
47	September 19, 2010	Lee Sang In; Sangchu (Mighty Mouth); Jinon (F.Cuz); Cho Young Gu; Sim Hyung Tak; Jung Suk-won; Pascal Dior; Bae Jae Joon; Karam (The Boss); Jung Mo (TRAX); Kim Kyung Rok (V.O.S); Lee Hyun (8Eight); Commentator: Lee Byung Jin	n/a	Pre-match game: Ping Pong Ball; 1st World Water Ssireum Championship	Chuseok Special
48	September 26, 2010	Lee Sang In; Lee Byung Jin; Sangchu (Mighty Mouth); Go Yoon Ho; Lee Sang Ho; Kim Kyeong Jin; Pascal Dior	National Rugby Team: Jeon Jong Man; Yoon Tae Il; Jae Gil Bin; Lee Kyu Deuk; Lee Jung Min; Park Wan yong; Kim Won Yong	Audience service game: Main event: General Obstacle Race	20th win; 2nd consecutive win; Lee Sang Ho's 1st Hall of Fame
49	October 3, 2010	Coached by Hyeon Jung Hwa: Choi Minho (Shinee); Jinon (F.Cuz); Coached by Kim Tae Su: Sangchu (Mighty Mouth); Park Sang Ho; Coached by Yoo Nam Kyu: Lee Sang In; Commentator: Lee Byung Jin	n/a	Table Tennis Challenge	Dream Team 5th Project
50	October 10, 2010	Kim Byung-man; Lee Sang In; Jinon (F.Cuz); Lee Jy Heon; Kim Dong Jun (ZE:A); Lee Hyun (8Eight); Go Yoon Hoo; Commentator: Lee Byung Jin	United Gumi Team: Lee Yun Yeol; Kim Uk; Kim Chang Seon; Jo Yeong Chan; Son Yong Hui; Seo Gyeong Wu; Yun Jung Sik	Audience service game: Rolling Table Tennis Ball; Main event: Ironman Obstacle Race; Cylinder Stepping-Stone Bridge; Swing Jump; Chin-up Bar Steps; Spinning Spider Web; Spiderman Jump	21st win; 3rd consecutive win; Kim Byung-man's 1st Hall of Fame
51	October 17, 2010	Kim Byung-man; Lee Sang In; Sangchu (Mighty Mouth); Ricky Kim; Jinon (F.Cuz); Lee Ju Hyeon; Go Yoon Hoo; Commentator: Lee Byung Jin	Ministry of Strategy and Finance Team: Baek San; Park Kyung Chan; Choi Seung Gyu; Park Chan Wung; Lee Ji Hun; Son Dae Gyun; Kim Seong Cheol	Audience service game: Rock-paper-scissors Duel; Main event: General Obstacle Race; Terrible Log Bridge; Water Gate Chin-up Bars; Rolling Log; Risky Cylinder; Rope Climbing	22nd win; 4th consecutive win; Ricky Kim's 1st Hall of Fame
52	October 24, 2010	Lee Sang In; Sangchu (Mighty Mouth); Ricky Kim; Jinon (F.Cuz); Lee Hyun (8Eight); Byun Gisu; 1Kyne (Electroboyz'); Commentator: Lee Byung Jin	Special Forces Martial Arts Team: Yeom Tae-beom; Park Sin-je; Lee Sang-won; Jo Seong-hyeon; Ryan; Jeon Tae-geun; Lee Bong-hwan	Audience service game: Spin the Bat; Main event: Ironman Obstacle Race; All-or-Nothing Mud Race; Cylinder Chin-up Bars; Spinning Submerging Bridge; Spinning Log Bridge; Hanging Punching Bag Sliding	9th loss; Opposing Team's Lee Bong-hwan's 1st Hall of Fame
53	October 31, 2010	Luna (f(x)); Bora (Sistar); Hyorin (Sistar); Jun Hyoseong (Secret); Zinger (Secret); Chae Yeon; Sung Eun; Kim Mi Yeon; Baek Bo Ram; Nancy Lang; Chu So Young; Lee Pa-ni; Keak Hyun Hwa; Seo Hyo Myung; Lee Ah Lee; NS Yoonji; Ahn Jin Kyuong; Moon Ji Eun; Hyun Ah (Nine Muses); Bini (Nine Muses); Demonstrators: Sangchu; Jinon (F.Cuz); Commentator: Lee Byung Jin	n/a	Main event: Women's General Obstacle course	Women's Drean Team "Queen of Queens"
54	November 7, 2010	Kim Byung-man; Lee Sang In; Ricky Kim; Jinon (F.Cuz); Kim Dong Jun (ZE:A); Lee Hyun (8Eight); Gwang Soo (Supernova); Commentator: Lee Byung Jin	National Water Polo Team: Kim Hyeon Jong; Kim Gi Wu; Song Geun Ho; Lee Hyeong Kyu; Kang Jun Won; Kwon Young Kyun; Song Won Ho	Pre-match game: Dream Team Water Polo Challenge; Audience service game: Main event: Ironman Obstacle Race; Cylinder Stepping-Stone Bridge; Two-Step Trampoline Jump; Spinning Cones Bridge; Spinning Submerging Bridge; Swing Slope Jump	23rd win; Ricky Kim's 2nd Hall of Fame
55	November 14, 2010	Krystal (f(x)); Victoria (f(x)); Bora (Sistar); Soyu (Sistar); Lee Boram (SeeYa); Jang Youngran; Kim Na-young; Jung Juri; Hong Jin Young; Hyena; Chu So Young; Jeon Sae Hong; Lee Ji Hye; Kim Jung Min; Park Eun Young; Eom Ji In; Sori; Oh Nami; Heo Anna; Lee Pa-ni; Demonstrators: Ricky Kim; Jinon (F.Cuz); Commentator: Lee Byung Jin	n/a	Main event: Women's General Obstacle course; Risky Log Bridge; Spinning Stepping-Stones Bridge; Tube Escape Race; Spinning Log Bridge; Rope Climbing	Women's Drean Team "Queen of Queens Part 2"; Bora 1st Hall of Fame (1m29.99s)
56	November 21, 2010	Kim Byung-man; Lee Sang In; Sangchu (Mighty Mouth); Ricky Kim; Jinon (F.Cuz); Kim Dong Jun (ZE:A); Lee Hyun (8Eight); Chansung (2PM); Commentator: Lee Byung Jin	Women's Gymnastics All-Star Team: Cha Myung-ji; Han Yeon-sook; Baek Hwa-seung; Cho Hee-yeon; Kim Seon	Pre-match game: Dream Team Representative Elimination Round; Main event: Horse Vaulting Showdown	Dream Team wins (2.8m)
57	November 28, 2010	Lee Sang In; Sangchu (Mighty Mouth); Ricky Kim; Jinon (F.Cuz); Kim Dong Jun (ZE:A); Lee Hyun (8Eight); Commentator: Lee Byung Jin	2PM Team: Jun. K; Nichkhun; Taecyeon; Wooyoung; Lee Junho; Chansung	Pre-match game 1: Relay Slam Dunk (Dream Team Wins); Pre-match game 2: Dance Battle (2PM Wins); Main event: Ssireum Showdown	24th win; 2nd consecutive win; Lee Hyun wins
58	December 5, 2010	Lee Sang In; Sangchu (Mighty Mouth); Ricky Kim; Jinon (F.Cuz); Kim Dong Jun (ZE:A); Lee Ju Hyeon; Commentator: Lee Byung Jin	n/a	Archery Challenge	Dream Team 6th Project; Ricky Kim wins
59	December 12, 2010	Lee Sang In; Sangchu (Mighty Mouth); Ricky Kim; Jinon (F.Cuz); Kim Dong Jun (ZE:A); Lee Hyun (8Eight); Commentator: Lee Byung Jin	2PM Team: Jun. K; Nichkhun; Taecyeon; Wooyoung; Lee Junho; Chansung	Audience service game: Rock-paper-scissors Duel; Main event: General Obstacle Race	25th win; 3rd consecutive win; Ricky Kim's 3rd Hall of Fame (40.07s)
60	December 19, 2010	Lee Sang In; Sangchu (Mighty Mouth); Ricky Kim; Kim Hyeon Ok; Kim Dong Jun (ZE:A); Lee Sang Ho; Chansung (2PM); Commentator: Lee Byung Jin	Korea University Sports Team: Kim Dong Cheol (Soccer Department); Kim Kyeong Joong (Soccer Department); Lee Hak Seob (Rugby Department); Yoo Seong Yong (Rugby Department); Yoon Myeong Jun (Baseball Department); Jeong Beom Su (Basketball Department); Kim Woo Young (Ice Hockey Department)	Audience service game: Flying Rubber Shoes; Main event: General Obstacle Race	26th win; 4th consecutive win; Ricky Kim's 4th Hall of Fame
61	December 26, 2010	Kim Byung-man; Lee Sang In; Sangchu (Mighty Mouth); Tae Min (Shinee); Choi Minho (Shinee); Ricky Kim; Jinon (F.Cuz); Jung Suk-won; Lee Byung Jin	n/a	Red Team vs. Blue Team; Puzzle Race; Mud Ssireum	Winter Special! Saipan Winter Training Camp Special Part 1

== 2011 ==
Episode #	Date Aired	Cast	Opposing Team	Event(s)	Comments
62	January 2, 2011	Kim Byung-man; Lee Sang In; Sangchu (Mighty Mouth); Taemin (Shinee); Choi Minho (Shinee); Ricky Kim; Jinon (F.Cuz); Chansung (2PM); Jung Suk-won; Lee Byung Jin	n/a	Image Questionnaire "That's You"; Hamster Ball Race	Winter Special! Saipan Winter Training Camp Special Part 2
63	January 9, 2011	Kim Byung-man; Lee Sang In; Sangchu (Mighty Mouth); Ricky Kim; Jinon (F.Cuz); Chansung (2PM); Jung Suk-won; Lee Byung Jin; Pair's Water Basketball	n/a	Ultimate Water Ssireum	Winter Special! Saipan Winter Training Camp Special Part 3
64	January 16, 2011	Kim Byung-man; Lee Sang In; Sangchu (Mighty Mouth); Ricky Kim; Jinon (F.Cuz); Jung Suk-won; Bae Jae Joon; Commentator: Lee Byung Jin	Korea Asset Management Team: Kwon Young Dae; Kim Young Guk; Moon Byung Sam; Oh Myung Woon; Lee Jeong Yoon; Kang Seong Hyo; Jo Young Jun	Audience service game: Jegichagi; Main Event: General Obstacle Race	27th win; 5th consecutive win; Kim Byung-man's 2nd Hall of Fame
65	January 23, 2011	Lee Sang In; Sangchu (Mighty Mouth); Ricky Kim; Jinon (F.Cuz); Kim Dong Jun (ZE:A); Lee Hyun (8Eight); Lee Ju Hyeon; Commentator: Lee Byung Jin	Elementary School Sports Instructors Team: Goo Young Ho; Na Gi Won; Seo Jin Kyu; Moon Jun Young; Park Yeon Su; Im Jae Yeol; Jeong Hae Ahn	Audience service game: Badminton; Main event: General Obstacle Race	10th loss
66	January 30, 2011	Lee Sang In; Sangchu (Mighty Mouth); Ricky Kim; Jinon (F.Cuz); Hyeon Jeong Hwa (production director); Commentator: Lee Byung Jin	Table Tennis Entertainers' Team: Jeong Eun Pyo; Shin Hyo Beom; Park Joon Hyung; Byun Ki Soo; Kim Boon Sik (as coach)	Dream Team vs. Table Tennis Entertainers' Team Showdown	11th loss; 2nd consecutive loss
67	February 6, 2011	Kim Byung-man; Lee Sang In; Sangchu (Mighty Mouth); Ricky Kim; Lee Ju Hyeon; Jo Young Gu; Heo Kyung Hwan; Commentator: Lee Byung Jin	CrossFit Athletes' Team: Yoo Seong Yeol; Lee Jae Ho; Go Seong Hyeon; Lee Geun Hyung; Lee Jae Ock; Brandon; Lee Seung Jun	CrossFit Experience; Main event: General Obstacle Race (Snow Ironman Match)	28th win; Kim Byung-man's 3rd Hall of Fame
68	February 13, 2011	Lee Sang In; Sangchu (Mighty Mouth); Ricky Kim; Jinon (F.Cuz); Kim Dong Jun (ZE:A); Lee Hyun (8Eight); Lee Ju Hyeon; Commentator: Lee Byung Jin	New Face Team: Daniel (Dalmatian); Jeong Hwan (M to M); Hong Seok Jae (Young Gunz); Park Jae Min; Lee Tae Seung; Cheon Ji; Chae Hwan	Audience service game: Snow Wrestling; Main event: General Obstacle Race (Snow Triathlon)	12th loss; Opposing Team's Park Jae Min's 1st Hall of Fame
69	February 20, 2011	Lee Sang In; Ricky Kim; Jinon (F.Cuz); Kim Dong Jun (ZE:A); Lee Hyun (8Eight); Lee Sang Ho; Park Jae Min; Commentator: Lee Byung Jin	Parkour Champion Team: Lee Beom Woo; Jeong Seong hwan; Gi Gwang Rok; Lee Jae Seong; Kim Hyeon Ock; Yang Dong Kwon; Jeong Guk Won	Audience service game: Pair's Soccer Passing; Main event: General Obstacle Race	13th loss; 2nd consecutive loss
70	February 27, 2011	Lee Sang In; Ricky Kim; Jinon (F.Cuz); Kim Dong Jun (ZE:A); Lee Hyun (8Eight); Lee Seung Yoon; Lee Sang Ho; Commentator: Lee Byung Jin	Korea's Sports Olympic Team: Kim Jae-yeob; Jegal Sung-Yeol; Yeo Hong-chul; Sim Kwon-Ho; Woo Ji-won; Lee Ju-young; Shin Jin-sik	Audience service game: Main event: General Obstacle Race	29th win; Ricky Kim's 5th Hall of Fame
71	February 27, 2011	Ricky Kim & Lee Pa-ni; Lee Ju Hyeon & Kim Sae Rom; Kim Dong Jun (ZE:A) & Chae Yeon; Lee Hyun (8Eight) & Jae Kyung (Rainbow); Lee Sang In & Lee Ji-ae; Jinon (F.Cuz) & Bora (Sistar); Coaches: Kim Jin-Ho; Cho Youn-Jeong; Lee Eun-Kyeong; Commentator: Lee Byung Jin	n/a	Couple's Archery	Dream Team 7th Project; Jinon & Bora wins
72	March 13, 2011	Lee Sang In; Ricky Kim; Jinon (F.Cuz); Kim Dong Jun (ZE:A); Lee Sang Ho; Heo Kyoung Hwan (replaced Jo Young Gu); Park Jae Min (replaced Kim Hyeon Ok); Commentator: Lee Byung Jin; Yoo Ji Chul	New Entertainer Strength Team: Moon Jun Young (ZE:A); Hoya (Infinite); Lee Hyung Seok; Lee Sang Min; Cheol Han (Jiggy Dogg); Wu Ju; Sung Yong (Touch); Jeong Hwan (M to M)	Audience service game: Zig Zag Run; Main event: General Obstacle Race	Recording was canceled due to rain and was recorded 4 days later; 30th win; 2nd consecutive win; Ricky Kim's 6th Hall of Fame
73	March 20, 2011	Kim Byung-man; Lee Sang In; Ricky Kim; Jinon (F.Cuz); Kim Dong Jun (ZE:A); Park Jae Min; Lee Sang Ho; Commentator: Lee Byung Jin	National Aerobics Team: Park Tae Jin; Kim Kyun Taek; Lee Seong Hwa; Yoon Tae Hee; Kim Eung Su; Yoon Gwang Seok; Ryu Ju Seon	Learn about aerobics; Main event: General Obstacle Race	31st win; 3rd consecutive win; Kim Byung-man's 4th Hall of Fame
74	March 27, 2011	Lee Sang In & Bora (Sistar); Jinon (F.Cuz) & Hyorin (Sistar); Lee Ju Hyeon & Chae Yeon; Daniel (Dalmatian) & Jae Kyung (Rainbow); Shorry J (Mighty Mouth) & Sori; Heo Kyung Hwan & Eun Ji (Nine Muses; Lee Sang Min & Lee Pa-ni; Park Jae Min & Han Groo; Kim Byung-man & JJ; Ricky Kim & Hyena; Commentator: Lee Byung Jin	n/a	Couple's Obstacle Course	Shorry J & Sori wins (gift certificate)
75	April 3, 2011	Coached by Yeo Hong Chul: Lee Sang In; Ricky Kim; Kim Dong Jun (ZE:A); Cho Young Gu; Heo Kyung Hwan; Coached by Yoo Ok Ryul: Jinon (F.Cuz); Lee Hyun (8Eight); Park Jae Min; Lee Seung Yoon; Seungho (MBLAQ); Commentator: Lee Byung Jin	n/a	High Jump	Dream Team 8th Project; Ricky Kim wins (2.55m)
76	April 10, 2011	Kim Byung-man; Lee Sang In; Ricky Kim; Shorry J (Mighty Mouth); Lee Sang Min; Cho Young Gu; Kim Hyeon Ok; Commentator: Lee Byung Jin	Stunt Men Action Team: Kwon Hyuk; Kang Young Mook; Jang Young Ju; Jung Dong Hyuk; Hyeon Dae Sik; Choi Jae Heon; Sim Chul Min	Audience service game: Main event: Ironman Obstacle Race	Stunt Men Action Team Re-match; 32nd win; 4th consecutive win; Kim Byung-man's 5th Hall of Fame
77	April 17, 2011	Lee Sang In & Kim Ran Sook; Ricky Kim & Lee Mi Hyang; Jinon (F.Cuz) & Lee Hwa Sook; Lee Hyun (8Eight) & Go Hee Sook; Bora (Sistar) & Kim Ji Nyeon; Chae Yeon & Lee Myung Gu; Lee Pa-ni & Kim Jung Hoon; Jae Kyung (Rainbow) Shim Sang Ok; Coaches: Cho Youn-Jeong; Lee Eun-Kyoung; Commentator: Lee Byung Jin	n/a	Couple's Archery	Disabled Day Special; Couple Archery Special Part 2; Lee Sang In & Kim Ran Sook wins
78	April 24, 2011	Kim Byung-man; Lee Sang In; Ricky Kim; Jinon (F.Cuz); Lee Hyun (8Eight); Park Seong Gwang; Lee Seung Yoon; Taeho; Commentator: Lee Byung Jin	Korea National Ballet Company Team: Park Il; Lee Young Chul; Jeong Young Jae; Park Gi Hyeon; Bae Min Soon; Seo Jae Min; Kim Hee Hyeon	Audience service game: Ballerino Spin Spin Spin; Main event: Ironman Obstacle Race	33rd win; 5th consecutive win; Ricky Kim's 7th Hall of Fame
79	May 1, 2011	Lee Sang In; Ricky Kim; Jinon (F.Cuz); Lee Sang Min; Sim Kwon-Ho; Lee Seung Yeon; Lee Hyung Seok; Commentator: Lee Byung Jin	World Taekwondo Jump Rope Representative Team: Kim Byeong Jin; Jang Soon Ho; Go Yoo Seob; Choi Jang ho; Jung Myung Ho; Jo Gi Sik; Song Ho Jun	Audience service game: Pair's Jump Rope; Main event: General Obstacle Course	34th win; 6th consecutive win; Ricky Kim's 8th Hall of Fame
80	May 8, 2011	Kim Byung-man's Team: Kim Byung-man; Ricky Kim; Lee Sang In; Lee Seung Yeon; Oh Eon Jong; Kim Hyun Ok; Shin Jin Sik; Cho Young Gu; Yeo Hong Chul; Sim Kwon-Ho; Jeong Hwan's Team: Jeong Hwan (M to M); Jinon (F.Cuz); Lee Sang Ho; Lee Sang Min; Heo Kyung Hwan; Byun Gisu; Yoo Ji Cheol; Daniel (Dalmatian); Bae Jae Jun; Cheol Han (Jiggy Dogg); Commentator: Lee Byung Jin	n/a	Pre-match game: Flying Filial Son; Main event: Sliding Water Jump	Parents' Day Special; Gameplay: Slide down with the tube, grab and hold the board that contains a prize; Jeong Hwan grabbed a question-marked panel that was a bogey; Byeong Man won a bidet and gave it to Lee Sang Ho and Lee Sang Min as a gift; Byeong Man's Team (2) vs. Jeong Hwan's Team (0); Byeon Man's Team wins
81	May 15, 2011	Kim Byung-man; Lee Sang In; Ricky Kim; Jinon (F.Cuz); Lee Hyun (8Eight); Heo Kyung Hwan; W; Commentator: Yoo Ji Cheol	Youth Instructor Representative Team: Im Young Shin; Park Young Seok; Go Kyung Hwan; Heo Kyun; Chan Young Shil; Han Sang Hae; Oh Choi Geun	Audience service game: Water Ball Catch; Main event: General Obstacle Race	35th win; 7th consecutive win; Ricky Kim's 9th Hall of Fame
82	May 22, 2011	Lee Sang In; Ricky Kim; Jinon (F.Cuz); Lee Sang Min; Lee Ju Hyeon; Philip Choi; Lee Hyung Seok; Commentator: Lee Byung Jin	Acrobatics Representative Team: Kim Hoon Kyu; Kim Jin Tae; Kim Jin Hyeok; Kim Yo Han; Kim Nat; Park Cha Ri; Kim Won Seob	Audience service game: Gomusin Kick; Main event: General Obstacle Race	36th win; First 8th consecutive win; Ricky Kim's 10th Hall of Fame
83	May 29, 2011	Lee Sang In; Ricky Kim; Jinon (F.Cuz); Kim Dong Jun (ZE:A); Lee Hyun (8Eight); Soo Hyun (U-KISS); Shorry J (Mighty Mouth); Commentator: Lee Byung Jin	Kyung Hee University Gymnastics Team: Yeo Hong Chul; Yoo Ok Ryul; Moon Dong Ju; Yang kwang Jin; Noh Gi Tae; Kim Chan Song; Park Gwang Pyo	Audience service game: Couple Dance Bang Bang Bang; Main event: General Obstacle Race	37th win; First 9th consecutive win; Ricky Kim's 11th Hall of Fame
84	June 5, 2011	Lee Sang In; Ricky Kim; Jinon (F.Cuz); Lee Hyun (8Eight); Lee Sang Min; KCM; Kim Kyeong Jin; Seo In-guk; Sim Kwon-Ho; Lee Hyung Seok; Song Ho Beom; Yoo Min Sang; Kim Won Hyo; Kim Sang Won; Do Kyeong Hwan; Commentators: Lee Byung Jin; Lee Won Seok	n/a	World Mud Ssireum Championship	Lee Hyung Seok wins
85	June 12, 2011	Lee Sang In; Ricky Kim; Jinon (F.Cuz); Park Jung-min (SS501); Heo Kyung Hwan; Lee Hyung Seok; Noh Woo Jin; Commentator: Lee Byung Jin	8th Fighter Wing Pilot Team: Seo Seung Nam; Kwon Oh Chul; Sim Sang Eun; Kim Jin Won; Kim Tae Wan; Hang Sung Tae; Kim Ji Min	Audience service game: Hang the Ring Ring Ring!; Main event: General Obstacle Race; Stable Jump; Upgraded Spinning Lodge Bridge; Black Eagle Jump; V-River Race; Upgraded Transparent Wall	Special Appearance: Dal Shabet; 38th win; First 10th consecutive win; Ricky Kim's 12th Hall of Fame
86	June 19, 2011	Dream Team: Kim Byung-man & Jia (Miss A); Kim Dong Jun (ZE:A) & Bora (Sistar); Hwang Gwang Hee (ZE:A) & Min (Miss A); Lee Ju Yeon & Jae Kyung (Rainbow); Han Jeong Su & NS Yoonji; Nam Woo Hyun (Infinite) & Woori (Rainbow); C.A.P (Teen Top) & Dasom (Sistar); Noh Woo Jin & Kang Eun Bi; Commentator: Lee Byung Jin	Asia Star Team: Nichan & Aim ( Thailand); Takuya Terada & Tiara ( Japan); Natthew & Beau ( Thailand); Misheel Enkhtur & Anu Davaasuren ( Mongolia); Shim Zeng Jie & Cristie ( Singapore); He Lei & Li Lin ( China); Vu Anh Tuan & Nguyen Ti Ngoc ( Vietnam); Fauzi Baadila & Kinaryosih ( Indonesia)	Audience service game: Dodgeball; Main event: General Obstacle Race; Bridge Ladder; Spinning Rings; Pole Jump	Together With Asia Stars Part 1; Wildcard: Kim Dong Jun & Bora (Dream Team); Shim Zeng Jie & Beau (Asia Star Team); 39th win; First 11th consecutive win
87	June 26, 2011	Dream Team: Eunhyuk (Super Junior); Leeteuk (Super Junior); Shindong (Super Junior); Choi Minho (Shinee); Lee Taemin (Shinee); Kim Jung-mo (Trax); Commentator: Lee Byung Jin	Asia Star Team: Nichan ( Thailand); Takuya Terada ( Japan); Natthew ( Thailand); Misheel Enkhtur ( Mongolia); Shim Zeng Jie ( Singapore); He Lei (China); Vu Anh Tuan ( Vietnam); Fauzi Baadila ( Indonesia)	Couple Selection Game; Main event: General Obstacle Race; Star Race; Swing Cylinder Jump; Terrifying Water Pull-Up Bar; Spinning Pinwheel; Cowboy Spinning Discus	Together With Asia Stars Part 2; 40th win; First 12th consecutive win; Choi Minho's 1st Hall of Fame
88	July 3, 2011	Dream Team: Lee Sang In; Ricky Kim; Jinon (F.Cuz); Kim Dong Jun (ZE:A); Lee Hyung Seok; Lee Sang Min; Lee Soo-geun; Commentator: Lee Byung Jin	Nation's 100 Viewers Special Team (Top 7 members): Lee Dong Gi; Jeong Sang Hee; Ban Sa Hyeon; Kim Myeong Su; Kim Yong Joon; Kim Dong Hwon; Im Tae Hyeok	Main event: Terrifying Obstacle Hexathlon; Cylinder Foot Bridge; Terrifying Water Pull-Up Bar; Rotating Log Bridge; Cowboy Cylinder Jump; Relay Rotating Stick; Water Jump Climbing	Nation's 100 Viewers Special; 14th loss; Winner gets 5 days, 4 nights family trip voucher; Opposing Team's Jeong Sang Hee's 1st Hall of Fame
89	July 10, 2011	Dream Team: Lee Sang In; Ricky Kim; Jinon (F.Cuz); Lee Hyun (8Eight); Kim Seung Hyun; Lee Sang Min; Lee Kang (Turtles); Commentator: Lee Byung Jin	National Dance Sports Representative Team: Park Seong Woo; Jang Se Jin; Hwang Yong Ha; Jeong Jae Ho; Cho Sang Hyo; Lee Sang Min; Kim Do Hyeon	Audience service game: Shoot Me If You Can; Main event: Ironman Obstacle Race; Water Run; Swaying Swing Jump; Rolling the Cylinder; Cowboy Climbing; Upgraded Foot Bridge	40th win; Ricky Kim's 13th Hall of Fame
90	July 17, 2011	Dream Team: Lee Sang In; Ricky Kim; Lee Hyung Seok; Tony An; Noh Yoo Min; Jeong Tae Ho; Kim Kyeong Jin; Commentator: Lee Byung Jin	Nonsan Army Training Representative Team: Seong Hyun Mo; Lee Ho Beom; Im Da Rang; Nam Gi Dong; Chae Jong Gook; Yoon Hyun Mi; Lee Min Hyung	Audience service game: Shuttlecock of Love; Main event: Ironman Obstacle Race; Rotating Magic Club; Hand Bike Jump; Log Bridge with Rotating Obstacle; Rotating Waterwheel; Sliding Sandbag Jump	15th loss; Opposing Team's Chae Jong Gook's 1st Hall of Fame; Special appearance: Girl's Day
-	July 24, 2011	Due to 2011 Final World Swimming Championships – Male 400M Freestyle Finals and Awards, Let's Go! Dream Team Season 2 did not air			
91	July 31, 2011	Dream Team: Jun. K; Nichkhun; Taecyeon; Wooyoung; Lee Junho; Chansung; Commentator: Lee Byung Jin	Human Survival Challenger Team: Heo Hong; Noh Seung Hyuk; Kim Sung Kyung; Bang Chang Suk; Kim Ho Jin; Seo Min Soo; Kim Young Pil	Audience service game: Partner Spin and Clap; Main event: Ironman Obstacle Race; Tower Foot Bridge; Swing Cylinder Jump; Rail Sliding; Four Spinning Pinwheels; Three-Piece Rotating Bridge	41st win; Hwang Chansung's 1st Hall of Fame
92	August 8, 2011	Lee Pa-ni; Kim Mi Yeon; Kim Na Young; Kang Eun Bi; Kim Hye-jin; Dana (The Grace); Sunday (The Grace); Jae Kyung (Rainbow); Hyun Young (Rainbow); Bora (Sistar); Dasom (Sistar); Eunji (Nine Muses); Hyemi (Nine Muses); So Jin (Girl's Day); Min Ah (Girl's Day); Viki (Dal★Shabet); Subin (Dal★Shabet); Joy (RaNia); T-Ae (RaNia); Ji Won (Aurora); Commentator: Lee Byung Jin	n/a	Round 1: Ice Sliding; Round 2: Water Race; Round 3: Underwater Wrestling	Summer Special Dream Girls; Winners: Round 1: Bora; Round 2: Lee Pa-ni; Round 3: Dana
93	August 14, 2011	Dream Team: Lee Sang In; Lee Hyung Seok; Lee Sang Min; Park Jae Min; Han Min Gwan; Jang Woo Hyuk; Kim Hyun Chul; Commentator: Lee Byung Jin	Republic of Korea Coast Guard (Sea Special Attack) Team: Choi Hyung Gyu; Kim Yoon Tae; Lee Jong Min; Lee Kwang Mo; Kwon Jae Jun; Kim In Soo; Kim Do Hyung	Audience service game: Ronal-Heading-Yo!; Main event: Ironman Obstacle Race; Water Pull-Up Bar; Rotating Triangle; Thunder Bolt Jump; Rotating Spider Web; Spiderman Jump	Gwangbokjeol Special; 16th lost; Opposing Team's Lee Jong Min's 2nd Hall of Fame
94	August 21, 2011	Dream Team: Ricky Kim; Jung Jinwoon (2AM); Park Jin-young; Lee Hyun (8Eight); Kim Tae-woo; Han Jeong Soo; Seo Ji-seok; Jo Dong-hyuk; Na Yoon Kwon; Song Ho Beom; Yoo Min Sang; Oh Un Jong; Coach: Woo Ji Won; Commentator: Lee Byung Jin; Lee Chung Hee	Ansan Shinhan Bank S-Birds Basketball Team: Choi Youn-Ah; Coach: Im Dal Sik; Wi Seong Woo; Jeon Ju Won	Audience service game: One Bound Free Throw!; Main event: Basketball	Dream Team 9th Project; Shinhan Bank S-Birds Basketball Team wins (91:88)
95	August 28, 2011	Dream Team: Ricky Kim; Kim Jong Min; Kim Dong Jun (ZE:A); Hwang Kwang Hee (ZE:A); Lee Se Chang; Han Min Kwan; Park Jae Min; Commentator: Lee Byung Jin; Lee Chung Hee	MMA Team: Denis Kang; Yu Wu Seong; Kang Kyeong Ho; Kim Jae Yeong; Nam Ui Cheol; Kim Seok Mo; Lee Seung Yun	Audience service game: Cookie in my Mouth; Main event: General Obstacle Race; Rotating Magic Club; Sudden Obstacle Jump; Uphill Bar; Four Rotating Waterwheels; Cylinder Hill Run	Ricky Kim's 14th Hall of Fame; 42nd win
96	September 4, 2011	Kim Min Gyo; Shim Shin; LJ; Oh Ji Hun; Seo In-guk; Jaehyo (Block B); Sung Yong (Touch); Choi Jong Yoon; Maeng Se Chang (BoM); Yoo Ah (BoM); Kang In Su (Myname); Kim Se Yong (Myname); Gun Woo; Gun Hee (EN-Tik); Kim Ee Ahn; Kim Ji Han; Park Jong Hwan; Park Chang Hwan; Seo Woo Jin; Seo Yoon; Sung Woong; Yoo Barom (C-Clown); Lee Ah Chung; Jo Sung Woo (Fix); Cheol Han (Jiggy Dogg); Choi Sung Joon; Tae Yee (BB Boys); Hong Won Bin; Role Model: Ricky Kim; Commentator: Lee Byung Jin	n/a	Mud Wrestling; Main event: Ironman Obstacle Race; Tower Foot Bridge; Gym Ball Surfing; Sway Bridge Jump; Rotating Ladder Bar; Swing Sandbag Jump	Special Appearance: Jeong Bong Ok; Ultimate Tournament Part 1; Winner from the Mud Wrestling event and 6 winners from the Obstacle Race will become the Ultimate Rookie Team and compete against Super Junior (see Ep. 98)
97	September 11, 2011	Ricky Kim; Kim Dong Jun (ZE:A); Lee Hyun (8Eight); Shorry J (Mighty Mouth); Seo In-guk; Jung Mo (TRAX); Kim Jong Min; Noh Yoo Min; Jo Bin (Norazo); Bae Gi Seong; Park Jun Hyung; Park Hyun Bin; Jo Woon Jong; Yoon Hyung Bin; Kim Jun Hyun; Yoo Min Sang; Commentator: Lee Byung Jin; Lee Won Seok	n/a	Main event: Chuseok Special – The 2nd Water Ssireum Championships	Chuseok Special; Special Appearance: Jeong Bong Ok; Seo In-guk wins
98	September 18, 2011	Dream Team: Leeteuk (Super Junior); Yesung (Super Junior); Shindong (Super Junior); Eunhyuk (Super Junior); Donghae (Super Junior); Sung Min (Super Junior); Commentator: Lee Byung Jin	Ultimate Rookie Team: Sung Woong; Yoo Barom (C-Clown); Jaehyo (Block B); Cheol Han (Jiggy Dogg); Choi Jong Yoon; Hong Won Bin; Kang Chang Mok; Coach: Ricky Kim	Audience service game: Ronal-heading Yo!; Main event: Ironman Obstacle Race; Tower Foot Bridge; Gym Ball Surfing; Sway Bridge Jump; Rotating Ladder Bar; Swing Sandbag Jump	Ultimate Tournament Part 2; Eunhyuk's 1st Hall of Fame; 43rd win; 2nd consecutive win
99	September 25, 2011	Dream Team: Lee Sang In; Ricky Kim; Lee Hyun (8Eight); Park Jae Min; Kim Hyun Chul; Kim Kyu Jong (SS501); Jung Jinwoon (2AM); Commentator: Lee Byung Jin	World Martial Arts Team: Park Chang Kyu; Lee Hee Woo; Park Hong Jin; Myung Min Ho; Gggo Wit; Kim Man Seob; Heo Dae Young	Audience service game: Jump Rope on the Acupuncture Mat; Main event: Ironman Obstacle Race; Rotating Log Bridge; Shaolin Swing; Elastic Foot Bridge; Rotating Pot Jump; Sliding Sandbag Jump	44th win; 3rd consecutive win; Winner will automatically enter the "King of the Kings" special (Episode 100); Lee Hyun (8Eight) 1st Hall of Fame.
100	October 2, 2011	Dream Team: Kim Dong Jun (ZE:A); Moon Jun Young (ZE:A); Park Jae Min; Jung Mo (TRAX); Lee Sae Chang; Sung Woong; Kang Chang Mok; Commentator: Lee Byung Jin	Gag Concert Team: Kim Dae Hee; Lee Seung Yoon; Han Min Gwan; Lee Sang Ho; Lee Sang Min; Lee Jong Hoon; Ryu Geun Ji	Kart racing experience; Audience service game: Wonderful Iron Rod Wrestling; Main event: Sliding Speed Racer	17th loss
101	October 9, 2011	Kim Byung-man; Ricky Kim; Chansung (2PM); Choi Minho (Shinee); Sangchu (Mighty Mouth); Lee Hyun (8Eight); Lee Sang Ho; Park Jae Min; Kim In Su (Republic of Korea Coast Guard Team); Lee Jong Min (Republic of Korea Coast Guard Team); Moon Jun Young (Elementary School Sports Instructors Team); Lee Bong-hwan (Special Forces Martial Arts Team); Yang Dong Kwon (Parkour Champion Team); Chae Jong Gook (Nonsan Army Training Representative Team); Jeong Sang Hee (Nation's 100 Viewers Special Team); Commentator: Lee Byung Jin	n/a	Couple game: Saving Mr. Water Balloon; Main event: Six-course General Obstacle Race; Cylinder Foot Bridge; Relay Rotating Stick; Submerging Rotating Stick; Four Spinning Pinwheels; Cowboy Spinning Discus Jump; Three-Piece Rotating Bridge	"King of the Kings" special; Special guest: Kara; Winner Choi Minho (Shinee) received a Kia K7 (Cadenza)
102	October 16, 2011		n/a	Couple game: Saving Mr. Water Balloon; Main event: Six-course General Obstacle Race; Cylinder Foot Bridge; Relay Rotating Stick; Submerging Rotating Stick; Four Spinning Pinwheels; Cowboy Spinning Discus Jump; Three-Piece Rotating Bridge	"King of the Kings" special; Special guest: Kara; Winner Choi Minho (Shinee) received a Kia K7 (Cadenza)
103	October 23, 2011	Yoo Ok Ryul's Team: Kim Dong Jun (ZE:A); Lee Hyun (8Eight); Park Jae Min; Seungho (MBLAQ); Cheondung (MBLAQ); Yoo Hee Yeol's Team: Han Min Kwan; Jeong Jong Cheol; Lee Ah Chung; Soo Hyun (U-KISS); Hoon (U-KISS); Commentator: Lee Byung Jin	n/a	Main event: Horse Vaulting; Challenge to break 2.7m record	Dream Team 10th Project; Yoo Ok Ryul's Team wins; Park Jae Min, Lee Hyun and Kim Dong Jun fails to break record
High-Definition broadcast
104	October 31, 2011	Dream Team: Ricky Kim; Yoo Min Sang; Shorry J (Mighty Mouth); Kim Kyung Jin; Kim Kyu Jong (SS501); Lee Hong-gi (F.T. Island); Choi Jong Hun (F.T. Island); Lee Jae Jin (F.T. Island); Commentator: Lee Byung Jin	Women's Junior Handball National Team Coach: Im Oh Kyung	Audience service game: Plates guessing game; Main event: Tornado Shooting King	45th win
106	December 14, 2011	Girls' Generation: Tiffany; Taeyeon; Jessica; Sunny; Hyoyeon; Yuri; Sooyoung; Yoona; Seohyun; Commentator: Lee Byung Jin; Hyeonmu	N/A	Heartbeat Dance Game; Main Event: Olympics; Event #1: 200m Race Walking; Event #2: One on One Block Masonry; Event #3: Pull Up Bar Ssireum; Event #4: Survival Capture The Flag	Hyoyeon wins
107	December 21, 2011	Dream Team: Park Jaemin; Park Seongho; Jaehyo (Block B); Junyoung (ZE:A); Minkwan; Dongjun (ZE:A); Seongjo; Commentator: Lee Byung Jin	2011 Nationwide Firefighting Kings: Lee Junho; Kang Kwonhui; Oh Kwanseok; Jo Byeongju; Ko Jeonghun; Lee Ilhae; Kim Jongseok	Audience service game: Water Gun Assembly; Main event: General Obstacle Race; Thunderbolt Race; Unpredictable Dropping Stick; Rotating Triangular Wall; High Altitude Smashing Jump; Final Countdown	4th Draw
108	December 28, 2011	Dream Team: Park Hyun Bin; Lee Sang Mmin; Jaehyo (Block B); Yeonggil; Ricky Kim; Shorry (Mighty Mouth); Choi Seongjo; Commentator: Lee Byung Jin	Farmer's Team: Lee Haengdo; Park Juntae; Kim Jinwu; Gwihwan; An Byeongjo; Kwan Chilmun; Kim Hyeongkyun	Audience service game: Jegi Chagi (Hacky Sack); Main event: General Obstacle Race; Rotating Log Bridge; Luck Or Not Tightrope Walking; Rotating Tetragon; Three-Piece Rotating Bridge; Swing Jump Transparent Wall	Dream Team Wins - 47th win; Ricky Kim 1 min 1.09 seconds; Farmer's Day Special

== 2012 ==
Episode #	Date Aired	Cast	Opposing Team	Event(s)	Comments
109	January 4, 2012	Dream Team: Shorry (Mighty Mouth); Choi Seong Jo; Jaehyo (Block B); Noh Woojin; Ricky Kim; Park Jae Min; Lee Juhyeon; Commentator: Lee Byung Jin	KNSU Wrestling Team: Shim Kwonho; Lee Daeho; Kim Yeongha; Jeon Neulpureunsan; Choi Insang; Choi Hyeongmuk; Seo Min-woo	Audience service game: Fill The Rubber Shoes; Main event: General Obstacle Race; Thunderbolt Race; Spinning Pinwheels Jump; Rotating Three Bar Cylinder; High Altitude Smashing Jump; Sliding Sandbag Jump	18th Loss; Kim Yeongha 1 min 34.56 seconds
110	January 11, 2012	Dream Team: Shorry (Mighty Mouth); Jaehyo (Block B); Ricky Kim; Kwang Hee (ZE:A); Lee Juhyeon; Choi Yeonggu; Lee Jaehu; Seo In-guk; Siho; Lee Seungyun; Song Hobeom; Kim Dongjun (ZE:A); Lee Sangho; Lee Sang Min; Park Jaemin; Kim Kyujong; Oh Jiwon; Jinho; Hagun; Geumyong; Kim Seunghyun (N-Train); Sechang; Kang Changmuk; Yang Sehyoung; Lee Jonghun; Ahchung; Yo Hongchul; Choi Seong Jo; J.Heart (N:SONIC); Gunwoo (Myname); Cho Sungwoo; Kim Hyunuk; Junyoung (ZE:A); Yua; Okryeol; Black J (N:SONIC); JoJo; Kwonho; Soul J (N-Train); Seyong (Myname); Commentator: Lee Byung Jin	n/a	Main event: Super Race Capture The Flag (40 Celebrities); Consolation Match: Flying Touchman	Special Guest: Dal Shabet; Winner: Yo Hongchul
112	January 25, 2012	Pro-Ricky Team: Ricky Kim; Lee Juhyeon; Seyong (Myname); Lee Sang Ho; Han Minkwan; Jaehyo (Block B); Ji Hagun; Anti-Ricky Team: Lee Sang In; Dongjun (ZE:A); Siho; Park Jaemin; Choi Seongjo; Lee Sang Min; Lee Seungyun; Commentator: Heo June	n/a	Audience service game: Here Goes The Snow; Main event: Snow Pentathlon; Snow Tube Riding; Terrifying Sway Bridge; Rotating Ladder Bar; Snowman Jump; Santa Jump	Anti-Ricky Team wins; Lee Sang Min 1 min 11.61 or (1 min 11.62) seconds; Christmas Special; Special Guest: Brave Girls
115	February 15, 2012	Dream Team: Shorry (Mighty Mouth); Seyong (Myname); Choi Seong Jo; Tim; Ricky Kim; Park Jae Min; Lee Juhyeon; Commentator: Lee Byung Jin	Sports All Star Team: Yeo Hongcheol; Kim Byung-Ji; Shim Kwonho; Jegal Seongryeol; Wu Jiwon; Ha Taekwon; Kim Dongsung	Audience service game: Reveal Who They Are; Main event: General Obstacle Race; Rotating Three Bar Cylinder; Superhero Rock Paper Scissors; Relay Rotating Stick; Hang The Hat; Swinging Wall Climb	19 Loss; Jegal Seongryeol 1 min 3.43 seconds
116	February 22, 2012	Dream Team: Ricky Kim; Park Junhyeong; Kim Changryeol (DJ DOC); Park Jaemin; Yoon Hyeongbin; Seo In-guk; Lee Sang In; Jo Yeonggu; Kim Junhyun; Kim Jiho; Park Hyunbin; Jang Minho; Shorry (Mighty Mouth); Sung Daehyun (R.ef); Kim Dongjun (ZE:A); Seyong (Myname); Commentator: Lee Byung Jin	n/a	2012 Ssireum Championship	Winner gets Complete Korean Beef Set; Lunar New Year Special; Kim Junhyun wins; Special Guest: Wink (trot twins)
117	February 29, 2012	Dream Team: Ricky Kim; Choi Seong Jo; Park Jaemin; Lee Sang Ho; Kim Dongjun (ZE:A); Yeo Hongchul; Sung Daehyun (R.ef); Lee Juhyeon; Jo Bin (Norazo); Lee Hyuk (Norazo); Siho; Tim; Song Yeonggil; Shangchu (Mighty Mouth); Shorry (Mighty Mouth); Jung Beomkyun; Kim Kyu Jong (SS501); Gunwoo (Myname); Seyong (Myname); Hoik (Double A (band)); Commentator: Heo June	n/a	2012 Snow Race; In honor of the announcement of the 2018 Winter Olympics in South Korea	Winner receives a full set of snowboard equipment; Speed King: Choi Seongjo
118	March 7, 2012	Dream Team: Han Min Kwan; Choi Seong Jo; Lee Sang Min; Lee Joon (MBLAQ); Brian (Fly To The Sky); Park Jae Min; Lee Sang In; Commentator: Lee Byung Jin	Marine Mujeokdo Team: Park Yong Jin; Park Hee Seong; Kim Do Gyeong; Lee Gyeong; Kim Jin Oh; Ryu Gyeong Min; Lee Jin Hyeok	Audience service game: Snow Tug-of-War; Main event: Ironman Obstacle Race; Rotating Triangle; Snow Tube Sliding; Swinging Cylinder; Snow Tube Sliding; Swing Snowman Jump	Choi Seongjo wins (1m 41.02s)
119	March 14, 2012	Dream Team: Park Jaemin; Seyong (Myname); Choi Seong Jo; Marcos (Invincible Baseball Team); Ghun (X-5); Ryu Geunji (Gag Concert); Park Seongho; Commentator: Lee Byung Jin	Share Happiness N Campaign Team: Han Kibum; Lim Hyuk Pil; Kim Jaewook; Lee Sang Ho; Lee Sang Min; Lee Junghui; Choi Byunghun; Go Bonggeun	Audience service game: Couple Jump Rope; Main event: General Obstacle Course; Elastic Foot Bridge; 15 Sit-Ups; Rotating Spider Web; Bounce Shoot; Rotating Pot Jump	Dream Team wins; Choi Seong Jo wins (49.10s)
120	March 21, 2012	Blue Team: Lee Pani and Kim Dongjun (ZE:A); Yewon (Jewelry) and Son Hoyoung; Park Eun Young and Ghun (X-5); Han Minkwan and Kim Jung Min; Seo In-guk and Jeon Se Hong; Red Team: Tim and Jaekyung (Rainbow); Kim Ji Won and Huh Kyung Hwan; NS Yoonji and Lee Joon; Choi Jong Hoon and Jang Doyeon; Kim Hye Young and Choi Seong Jo; Commentator: Lee Byung Jin	n/a	Couple Deciding; Rescue the Partner	Goodbye Winter Special; Couples Dream Team
121	March 28, 2012	Dream Team: Shorry (Mighty Mouth); Choi Seong Jo; Park Jae Min; Lee Juhyeon; Lee Sang Min; Marcos; Jinwon; Commentator: Lee Byung Jin	Extreme Sports Team: Bang Changsuk; Kim Kwanok; Insoo; Choi Kyungho; Lee Dongun; Kim Sung Kyung; Han Junghui	Audience service game: Use Your Head; Main event: General Obstacle Race; Tornado Race; Pump Pump Pang Pang; Extreme Overhead Ladder; Speed Zigzag Race; Spinning Pinwheels	Dream Team wins; Choi Seong Jo: 1 min 59.19 seconds
122	April 4, 2012	Gag Concert Team: Siho; Park Seongho; Lee Sang Ho; Jonghun; Sangguk; Singer Team: Seobeom; Lee Jung; Gunwoo (Myname); Dongwoo (Infinite (band)); Hoya (Infinite (band)); Actors Team: Im Daeho; Jaedeok; Dohwan; Lim Ho; Park Jeongcheol; Dream Team: Kim Dongjun (ZE:A); Lee Sang Min; Seyong (Myname); Choi Seong Jo; Marcos; Commentator: Lee Byung Jin; Han Junhui	Goalkeepers: Kim Byung-Ji; Yoon Kihae; Min Yugyeong	Viewer Service Game:Fly Shooting King; Penalty Shoot-out Championship	Lee Sang Ho wins the Golden Shoes
124	April 18, 2012	Coach Cho Heeyeon's Team: Shorry (Mighty Mouth); Lee Sang Ho (Gag Concert); Neil (Teen Top); Choi Seong Jo; Kim Jiwoon (rookie); Seo Jiwon (rookie); Coach Bang Seunghun's Team: Marcos; Park Jaemin; Kyunsung (Noel); Sunghoon; Jang Minho (rookie); Haewon (rookie); 13 Rookies Fighting For 4 Spots: Kim Minkyo; Jang Minho; Macho (WE); Mandu (WE); Kim Jiwoon; Seo Jiwon (F-iv); Haewon (X-5); Sungwoo (FIX); Dong Hyunbae; So Geonwu; Junhyuk (M to M); Kim Minwu; Hanbyul (Led Apple); Commentator: Lee Byung Jin; Jo Seongmo	n/a	Swimming Championship: 50 Meter Freestyle (Individual); Sunghoon won 1 gold medal (Bang); 2-man 50 meter backstroke; Jiwoon and Niel won 2 gold medals (Cho); 2-man 50 meter butterfly stroke; Jang Minho and Sunghoon won 2 gold medals (Bang); 100 meter medley relay race; Bang Team wins 4 gold medals; 150 meter Relay Freestyle; Cho's team wins 6 medals	12th Dream Team Project; Coach CHo's team wins 8 medals to 7
125	April 26, 2012	Dream Team: Dongjun (ZE:A); Shorry (Mighty Mouth); Choi Seong Jo; Sung Woong; Marcos (Invincible Baseball Team); Han Minkwan; Commentator: Lee Byung Jin	2AM Team: Jo Kwon; Jinwoon; Seulong; Chang Min; Kim Gyusang; Kim Munsu; Coach: Park Jaemin	Audience service game: Be A Bridge In This Troubled World; Main event: General Obstacle Race; One Bound Ping Pong; Spinning Stick Bridge; Cowboy Spinning Discus Jump; Countdown Sit-Ups; Sliding Sandbag Jump	Dream Team wins; Seongjo 57.20 seconds; Spring Special
126	May 2, 2012	Dream Team: Kim Jeongmin; Choi Seongjo; Yeo Hong-Chul; Park Seong Ho (Gag Concert); Kim Dongsung; Insoo (Myname); Lee Sangin; Park Jaemin; Shorry (Mighty Mouth); Kim Dongjun (ZE:A); Lee Sang Min (Gag Concert); Byeon Gisu; Sim Kwon-Ho; Jo Yeonggu; Thunder (MBLAQ); Mir (MBLAQ); Commentator: Lee Byung Jin	n/a	Mud Knee Wrestling Championship	Dongsung won

== See also ==
- Let's Go! Dream Team Season 2
