= Let's Go! Dream Team Season 2 =

- 출발 드림팀 시즌2
- Genre: Variety television
- Written by: Kim Ki-ryun; Yoon Young-gyeong; Lee Hyo-jung; Kim Hye-jung; Ju Ri-ra; Baek Ju-yeon
- Starring: Lee Chang-myeong (MC); Lee Byeong-jin (Commentator)
- Country of origin: South Korea
- Original language: Korean
- No. of seasons: 2
- No. of episodes: 300 (list of episodes)

Production
- Executive producer: Jeon Jin-hak
- Producers: Kwon Yong-taek; Lee Dong-hun; Kim Sung-min
- Camera setup: Multicamera setup
- Running time: Approximately 1 hours 10 minutes (70 minutes)

Original release
- Network: KBS2
- Release: September 13, 2009 – May 29, 2016

Let's Go! Dream Team Season 2 (Korean: 출발 드림팀 시즌2; Hanja: 出發 드림팀 시즌2) is an organized sports variety program that airs on KBS2. The first episode aired on June 25, 2009 and the last one on May 29, 2016. The pilot episode was aired on September 13, 2009 titled as Let's Go Dream Team 2 - Green Team Go!. The first season of Dream Team was aired for six years between 1999 and 2003. Production director, Jeon Jin Hak, and MC, Lee Chang Myung, from season 1 were invited and returned to record for season 2.

== Slogan ==
- Opening: "The legend of ten years! A split second win!" (10년의 신화! 1초의 승부!)
- Ending: "To build a society where everyone does his or her best and accepts the results as they are!" (승리를 위해 최선을 다하고 결과에 승복할 줄 하는 사회를 만들기 위해!)

== Production ==
- Main producer: Jeon Jin-hak
- Current producers: Kwon Yong-taek, Lee Dong-hoon, Kim Sung-min
  - Past producers: Kim Jin-hwan, Lee Tae-heon
- Current screenwriters: Kim Gi-ryun, Yoon Young-gyeong, Lee Hyo-jung, Kim Hye-jung, Ju Ri-ra, Baek Ju-yeon
  - Past screenwriters: Park Mi-gyeong, Kang Eun-ji, Im Ju-ri
- FD: Shin Ji-ung, Kim Hye-jin
- Voice: Lee Won-jun
- Dream Team Main Doctor: Yoon Hyun-seok (episode 1-103), Jeon Byeong-cheol (104-current)

== Team/cast ==
- MC: Lee Chang-myeong, Boom, Jo Woo-jong, Jeong Da-eun
- Commentators: Lee Byeong-jin, Yoo Ji-cheol
- Fixed cast: Ricky Kim, Choi Seong-jo, Shorry (Mighty Mouth), Park Jae-min, Agia
- Semi-fixed cast: Lee Sang-in, Kim Byung-man, Kwon Tae-Ho (Kwon Hyuk), Lee Hyun (8Eight), Heo Kyung-hwan, Lee Sang-ho, Lee Sang-min, Lee Seung Yoon, Kim Dong-jun (ZE:A), Park Jae-min, Lee Ju-hyeon, Kim Dong-seong, Lee Sang-hoon (100%), Jeong Jinwoon (2AM)
- Past cast: Jo Sungmo, Eunhyuk (Super Junior), Danny Ahn, Sangchu (Mighty Mouth), Jung Suk-won, Lee Junho (2PM), Hwang Chansung (2PM), Choi Minho (Shinee), Taemin (Shinee)

== Format ==
=== Audience service game ===
Before the main event, the cast will play an audience service game to show their appreciation of the fans coming out to the event. The members choose a partner, which is usually their manager, but they can also choose a staff member, the team's doctor (2), or an audience. The game is usually played between the Dream Team members but can also be the opposing team. The losing team will pay for the snacks. However, sometimes they continue the game until one member of the losing team is finally chosen to pay. The loser of the game will pay for all the snack expenses.

Audience service game snacks

Episode #	Snack
50	1000 fried dumplings
51	20 boxes of donuts
52	60 dishes of pizzas
59	4000 walnut-shaped cakes
60	1000 steamed buns
64	1000 tangerines
65	300 steamed buns
69	10 cases of tangerines
70	1000 steamed buns
72	1000 bananas
76	1300 rice drinks
78	1000 slices of pizzas
79	1500 pieces of chicken
81	1500 cans of aloe juice
82	1200 donuts
83	1000 steamed dumplings
85	1500 plum juice
89	1500 cans of barley soda
91	1500 cans of aloe juice
93	1000 peach iced tea
94	1200 sodas and bananas
95	1500 pieces of bread
98	1000 rice drinks
99	1000 Yuzu juice
100	1000 buns
104	1000 soymilk

=== Wildcard ===
Before the main event, each team will have a member participate at each obstacle. The winning team with fastest time and fewest eliminations will receive three wildcards, while the other team will receive two wildcards. If both teams have the same number of eliminations, then the team with the fastest time will receive three wildcards.

== Main event stats ==
Game	Wins	Draws	Losses	Games Played
General Obstacle Race	45	3	17	65
Ironman Obstacle Race	25	0	9	34

== Individual stats ==
=== Men (Dream Team) ===
Name	Wins
Ricky Kim	23
Choi Seong Jo	11
Minho (Shinee)	10
Sangchu (Mighty Mouth)	10
Kwon Taeho	7
Park Jae Min	5
Jota (Madtown)	4
Kim Byung-man	4
Lee Sang-ho	4
Lee Sang-hoon (100%)	4
Kim Dong-jun (ZE:A)	4
Eunhyuk (Super Junior)	3
Junho (2PM)	3
Chansung (2PM)	3
Lee Minhyuk (BtoB)	2
Lee Hyun (8Eight)	2
Brian	2
Lee Sang-min	1
Danny Ahn (G.O.D)	1
Hoon (U-KISS)	1

=== Women (Dream Team) ===
Name	Wins
Soyul (Crayon Pop)	6
Bora (Sistar)	5
Krystal (f(x))	5
Jisoo (TAHITI)	2
Lee Pa-ni	2
Jungah (After School)	2
Sori	1
Dana (The Grace)	1
Kim Jiwon	1

=== Men (opposing team) ===
Name	Team	Episode	Hall of Fame Appearances	Wins
Ameer Affan	Republic of Korea Coast Guard Team	45 & 93	2	2
	National Taekwondo Team	1	1	1
	B-Boy World Champion Team	2	1	1
	Stunt Action Actors Team	5	1	1
	Kia Tigers Representative Team	7 & 8	1	1
	Team Canada Representative Team	11	1	1
	Model Representative Team	39	1	1
Kim In Su	Former Powerhouse Team	40	1	1
Lee Bong-hwan	Special Forces Martial Arts Team	52	1	1
Moon Jun Young	Elementary School Sports Instructors Team	65	1	1
Park Jae Min	New Face Team	68	1	1
Yang Dong Kwon	Parkour Champion Team	69	1	1
Jeong Sang Hee	Nation's 100 Viewers Special Team	88	1	1
Chae Jong Gook	Nonsan Army Training Representative Team	90	1	1
