= Aftermath (South Korean TV series) =

2014 South Korean web series

- Promotional poster for season 1
- Genre: Thriller; mystery; supernatural
- Based on: Huyujeung by Kim Sun-kwon
- Screenplay by: Oh Bo-hyun; Lee Moon
- Directed by: Kim Yang-hee
- Starring: Kim Dong-jun; Joo Yeon-woo; Sun Joo-ah
- Country of origin: South Korea
- Original language: Korean
- No. of seasons: 2
- No. of episodes: 11

Production
- Producer: Jeon Eun-gi
- Running time: 10 minutes
- Production company: Oasis Pictures

Original release
- Network: Naver TV
- Release: 6 January – 18 January 2014

Aftermath (Korean: 후유증; RR: Huyujeung) is a 2014 South Korean web series starring Kim Dong-jun and based on Kim Sun-kwon's webtoon of the same title.

== Plot ==
After a car accident, high school student Dae-yong starts seeing people's eyes turn either red or blue. Soon he realizes there is a pattern and that red eyes mean that person is going to die and blue eyes mean that person is going to kill someone, and that he is now capable of saving people. At the same time, his relationships with his girlfriend Hee-kyung and best friend In-ho are at risk due to him having changed so much after becoming known as a hero.

== Cast ==
=== Main ===
- Kim Dong-jun as Ahn Dae-yong
- Joo Yeon-woo as Kim Joon-goo
- Sun Joo-ah as Joo Hee-kyung

=== Supporting ===
- Kim Min-seok as Cho In-ho
- Kim Ri-ah as Kim Na-ri
- Ji Sun as Dae-yong's mom
- Chae Hee-jae as Hee-kyung's uncle
- Choi Kyu-hwan as homeroom teacher
- Lee Seung-yong as police officer
- Cha Soon-hyung
