= Yoon Young-ah =

South Korean actress (born 1987)

Yoon Ji-yoo
- Born: Yoon Young-ah; March 15, 1987 (age 39); South Korea
- Other names: Han Ye-in (한예인); Yoon Ji-yoo
- Education: Sejong University - Film Arts
- Occupation: Actress
- Years active: 2000–present
- Agent: Hinge Entertainment
- Spouse: Unknown (m. 2024)

Korean name
- Hangul: 윤영아
- RR: Yun Yeonga
- MR: Yun Yŏnga

Stage name
- Hangul: 윤지유
- RR: Yun Jiyu
- MR: Yun Chiyu

Yoon Young-ah (Korean: 윤영아; born March 15, 1987), better known professionally as Yoon Ji-yoo, is a South Korean actress. Yoon began her career as a child actress, notably in the children's fantasy show Magic Kid Masuri (2002). She began using the stage name Han Ye-in in 2007 when she transitioned to more adult supporting roles in television dramas such as Coffee Prince. In 2011, she reverted to using her real name when she appeared in Dream High, before adopting her current stage name in 2015.

== Personal life ==
On June 7, 2024, Yoon announced she would be getting married the next day.

== Filmography ==
=== Television series ===
Year	Title	Role	Network
2000	KBS TV Novel: "Promise"	young Ji-soo	KBS1
2001	Four Sisters		MBC
2002	MBC Best Theater: "Go Until the Winter"	Eun-mi	MBC
2002	Magic Kid Masuri	Ma Ye-ye	KBS2
2004	The Age of Heroes	young Park So-sun	MBC
2007	Coffee Prince	Go Eun-sae	MBC
2007	How to Meet a Perfect Neighbor	Byun Seon	SBS
2007	Winter Bird	Yoo-ra	MBC
2007	Finding Love	Chae Yi-yeon	MBC Every 1
2008	Strongest Chil Woo	Daughter of murdered night watchman (guest, episode 3)	KBS2
2009	Again, My Love	Eun Soo-jin	KBS2
2011	Dream High	Lee Ri-ah	KBS2
2016	Marrying My Daughter Twice	Lee Ga-eun	SBS
2017	Love Returns	Jung In-jung	KBS1

=== Music video appearance ===
Year	Song title	Artist
2007	"Sunshower"	J-Walk
