= Midas (TV series) =

2011 South Korean television series

- Promotional poster
- Hangul: 마이더스
- RR: Maideoseu
- MR: Maidŏsŭ
- Genre: Romance; Business; Drama
- Written by: Choi Wan-kyu
- Directed by: Kang Shin-hyo; Lee Chang-min
- Starring: Jang Hyuk; Lee Min-jung; Kim Hee-ae; No Min-woo
- Country of origin: South Korea
- No. of episodes: 21

Production
- Production company: JS Pictures

Original release
- Network: SBS TV
- Release: February 22 – May 3, 2011

Midas (Korean: 마이더스) is a 2011 South Korean television series starring Jang Hyuk, Lee Min-jung and Kim Hee-ae. It tells the story of life in the mergers & acquisitions, stock market, and financial world amidst company takeovers and stock manipulation. It aired on SBS from February 22 to May 3, 2011 on Mondays and Tuesdays at 21:55. The series ran for a total of 21 episodes.

== Synopsis ==
Kim Do-hyun is an intelligent man with a modest upbringing. He is the top student in his class at one of the top-tier law schools in the country. While looking for prospective jobs, he is recruited as an attorney for an affluent family whose true wealth may be more than anyone could have imagined. His dreams of a peaceful life with his girlfriend (Lee Jung-yeon) are changed when someone "makes him an offer he can't refuse."

== Cast ==
=== Main characters ===
- Jang Hyuk as Kim Do-hyun (32 years old)

Do-hyun is a smart man with great ambition. Kim graduated at the top of his class from Korea's best university. He was also top of the class in law school. His father had left home when he was a child, leaving him and his mother in poverty. His mother raised him in hardship and died while he was studying in law school. He feels warmth in his heart only when he is with his long-time girlfriend Jung-yeon and her family. He wants to start a family and live happily with Jung-yeon. After graduating from law school, he joins the best law firm in Korea and works for the rich Yoo family. His ambitions soon turn into greed, which, in turn, begins to ruin his life.

- Lee Min-jung as Lee Jung-yeon (27 years old)

Lee is a longtime girlfriend of Do-hyun. After graduating from nursing school, she was employed by one of Korea's topmost general hospitals and she became a nurse in the said hospital's VIP wing soon after. When Do-hyun starts to become a different person after joining his law firm, Lee is forced to leave Do-hyun because of his greed. She joins Yoo Myung-joon in plotting revenge against Yoo In-hye, who they deemed responsible for Do-hyun's change of character.

- Kim Hee-ae as Yoo In-hye (40 years old)

Yoo In-hye is the eldest daughter in Yoo Pil-sang's family. The Yoo's seem like the average rich family, but their wealth is at the same level as Samsung and Hyundai. Yoo In-hye has two elder half-brothers, a younger brother and a younger sister. Not all of the five siblings have the same birth mother. In-hye's father left her mother after she had an affair. In order to escape the negative image of "the abandoned daughter of a chaebol", In-hye left Korea for the United States. She received her MBA at university, then gained experience as a securities broker in Wall Street. Now she is the president of her own multibillion-dollar hedge fund. Her grandfather's loan business, her father's real estate business, and her hedge fund company have the power to sway Korea's economy. She is a powerful woman with no romantic experience and has never been married. She hates, but also admires, her father, which gives her conflict. She is the one who will change Do-hyun's life, for better or for worse.

- No Min-woo as Yoo Myung-joon (31 years old)

Yoo Myung-joon is the younger brother of Yoo In-hye. Unlike his sister, he has a softer and more-delicate character. He is a patient in the hospital VIP room where Jung-yeon was assigned, and is in the terminal stages of cancer. Myung-joon believes that money is the reason for the misfortunes that he has suffered. Therefore, he views money as evil. Myung-joon has a cynical nature and wastes his time by partying from dusk till dawn. He was like this until Jung-yeon appeared in his life. As time goes by, a chemistry springs up between the two.

=== Supporting characters ===
Kim family

- Lee Deok-hwa as Kim Tae-sung
- Kim Sung-oh as Kim Do-chul, Do-hyun's half-brother

Yoo family

- Kim Sung-kyum as Yoo Pil-sang
- Choi Jung-woo as Yoo Ki-joon, In-hye's oldest brother
- Yoon Je-moon as Yoo Sung-joon, In-hye's second brother
- Han Yoo-i as Yoo Mi-ran, In-hye's little sister

Extended cast

- Chun Ho-jin as Choi Gook-hwan
- Shin So-yul as Kwon Yi-ji
- Lee Moon-soo as Lee Yong-gook
- Jung Suk-won as Jae-beom
- Seo Joo-ae as Soo-ji
- Lee Sang-yeob as Han Jang-seok
- Ricky Kim as Steven Lee
- Kim Ji-young as Woo Geum-ji
- Jo Sang-gook as Go Dong-choon
- Shin Seung-hwan as Jae-bok
- Lee Hae-yeong as Cha Yeong-min
- Kim Seon-il as Choi Gook-hwan
- Kim Byung-se as James
- Kim Byung-ki as Goo Seong-cheol
- Kang Kyung-hun as Bae Jung-ja
- Shin Chae-won as Yang Soo-jung
- Jeong Gook-hwan as Han Jin Su
- Baek Seung-hyeon as Chang-soo
- Yeo Ho-min as Hyeon Jin-woo
- Lee Seon-ho as Yoon Gi-wook
- Choi Young-shin as Room Salon Girl
- Jang Won-young as Man-soo
- Park Hyuk-kwon as Jang Geun-ho
- Kim Euug-soo as Mr. Choi Young Su, president of Shin-heung Bank
- Ji Dae-han as Jang Pil-do
- Yang Jin-woo as Lee Jeong-do

== Awards and nominations ==
Year	Award	Category	Recipient	Result
2011	4th Korea Drama Awards	Best Supporting Actor	Kim Sung-oh	Nominated
2011	19th SBS Drama Awards	Top Excellence Award, Actor in a Special Planning Drama	Jang Hyuk	Won
2011	19th SBS Drama Awards	Top Excellence Award, Actress in a Special Planning Drama	Kim Hee-ae	Nominated
2011	19th SBS Drama Awards	Excellence Award, Actress in a Special Planning Drama	Lee Min-jung	Nominated
2011	19th SBS Drama Awards	Special Acting Award, Actor in a Special Planning Drama	Yoon Je-moon	Won
