= List of South Korean models =

This is a list of South Korean models.

== A ==
- Ahn Jae-hyun

== C ==
- Choi Han-bit
- Choi Ji-woo
- Choi Soo-young

== I ==
- Im Yoona

== J ==
- Jun Ji-hyun

== H ==
- Harisu
- Daniel Henney
- Harsh Wadia

== K ==
- Daul Kim
- Kim Tae-hee
- Yu-ri Kim
- Kwon Sang-woo
- Kim Kyu Jong
- Ku Hye Sun

== L ==
- Lee Pa-ni
- Lee Sa-bi
- Lee Sung-kyung
- Lee Soo-hyuk
- Soo Yeon Lee

== O ==
- Oh Yoon-ah

== P ==
- Hye-rim Park

== S ==
- Song Yun-ah

== W ==
- Woo Seung-yeon

== Y ==
- Yi Hong

== See also ==
- Contemporary culture of South Korea
