= Han Bo-bae =

South Korean actress (born 1994)

- Born: March 4, 1994 (age 32); South Korea
- Education: Inha University
- Occupation: Actress
- Years active: 2002–present
- Agent: Broomstick Entertainment
- Spouse: Unknown (m. 2026)

Korean name
- Hangul: 한보배
- RR: Han Bobae
- MR: Han Pobae

Han Bo-bae (Korean: 한보배; born March 4, 1994) is a South Korean actress. Han began her career as a child actress, and has starred in films and television series such as The World of Silence (2006), A Company Man (2012), Total Messed Family (2014), Last Scandal (2008) and My Pitiful Sister (2008).

== Personal life ==
On December 29, 2025, Han announced her engagement to her boyfriend of eight years. Han married in March 2026.

== Filmography ==
=== Film ===
| Year | Title | Role |
|---|---|---|
| 2002 | Sympathy for Mr. Vengeance | Yu-sun |
| 2002 | R. U. Ready? | |
| 2002 | Phone | |
| 2002 | Lovers' Concerto | |
| 2004 | Home Sweet Home | |
| 2005 | The Birds and the Bees: A Secret You Shouldn't Keep (short film) | |
| 2005 | Aideuri Saneun Seong (animated) | (voice) |
| 2006 | No Mercy for the Rude | Young (the girl) |
| 2006 | The World of Silence | Park Soo-yeon |
| 2006 | Magic Lamp | |
| 2012 | A Company Man | Ra Bo-seul |
| 2014 | Total Messed Family | Baek Se-joo |
| 2018 | Stand by Me | Kindergarten Teacher |
| 2018 | Dong-Hwa | Eun-Jung |

=== Television series ===
| Year | Title | Role | Network |
|---|---|---|---|
| 2002 | Magic Kid Masuri | Choi Pool-ip | KBS2 |
| 2003 | Jewel in the Palace | | MBC |
| 2005 | Magic Fighter Mir & Gaon | | KBS2 |
| 2005 | Drama City: "Barefoot Kae-jo" | | KBS2 |
| 2005 | Ballad of Seodong | | SBS |
| 2006 | Drama City: "The Good Killer" | | KBS2 |
| 2006 | Spring Waltz | young Hong Mi-jung | KBS2 |
| 2007 | Ghost Pang Pang | Choi Byul | SBS |
| 2007 | New Heart | | SBS |
| 2008 | Last Scandal | Ahn Ji-min | MBC |
| 2008 | My Pitiful Sister | young Song In-ok | KBS1 |
| 2008 | Amnok River Flows | Moo Deon | SBS |
| 2009 | Empress Cheonchu | young Empress Seonjeong | KBS2 |
| 2009 | Hilarious Housewives | Han Bo-bae | MBC |
| 2009 | Smile, You | Han Yoon-jae | SBS |
| 2010 | Good Friends | | KBS2 |
| 2010 | MBC Sunday Drama Theater: "Housewife Kim Kwang-ja's Third Activities" | Choi Yoon-sun | MBC |
| 2010 | Dr. Champ | Jo Min-ji (cameo, episode 1) | SBS |
| 2011 | Sign | Aki-chan (episode 8) | SBS |
| 2011 | Gyebaek | young Cho-young | MBC |
| 2011 | A Thousand Days' Promise | young Lee Seo-yeon | SBS |
| 2012 | Insu, the Queen Mother | young Yoon Chang-yeon | jTBC |
| 2012 | Phantom | Kwak Ji-soo (cameo, episodes 7-8) | SBS |
| 2013 | Hur Jun, The Original Story | Chae-sun | MBC |
| 2015 | Make a Woman Cry | Hwang Kyung-ah | MBC |
| 2015 | Late Night Restaurant | Ji-hee (cameo) | SBS |
| 2015 | Remember | Oh Jung-ah | SBS |
| 2016 | The Doctors | Yoo Yoo-na | SBS |
| 2017 | Voice | Park Eun-byul | OCN |
| 2017 | School 2017 | Seo Bo-ra | KBS2 |
| 2018 | Welcome to Waikiki | Mal Geum/Cherry (episodes 7-9) | JTBC |
| 2021 | Undercover | Young Min Sang-ah | JTBC |

== Awards and nominations ==
| Year | Award | Category | Nominated work | Result |
|---|---|---|---|---|
| 2008 | KBS Drama Awards | Best Young Actress | My Pitiful Sister | Nominated |
