= Magic Kid Masuri =

2002–2004 Korean television series

- Genre: Fantasy
- Starring: Oh Seung-yoon; Yoon Young-ah; Kim Hee-jung; Han Bo-bae
- Country of origin: South Korea
- Original language: Korean
- No. of episodes: 496

Production
- Production location: South Korea

Original release
- Network: KBS2
- Release: February 18, 2002 – February 27, 2004

Magic Kid Masuri (Korean: 매직키드 마수리) is a 2002 South Korean television series starring Oh Seung-yoon, Yoon Young-ah, Kim Hee-jung and Han Bo-bae.

The children's drama aired on KBS 2TV from February 2002 to February 2004. It tells the story of the Surine family, who came to the human world to learn human emotions in a magical world that was chaotic due to the conflict between the Elder Council (White Bridge) and the Witch Council (Red Bridge).

The drama aired a total of 496 episodes for two years from February 18, 2002 to February 27, 2004 through KBS 2TV, achieving an average audience rating of 15%, making it the longest broadcast among children's dramas.

The anime aired on KBS 2TV from September 26 to December 16, 2008. It was expected that high ratings would come out following the children's drama, but due to the low ratings, the work that was scheduled to end in 39 episodes ended early with 13 episodes.

== Introduction ==
With the selfish minds of the wizards, the magical world is thrown into uncontrollable chaos. In response, the elders of the magical land agree to send a wizard family to the world of humans — who live in harmony with each other and rely on each other, but have a lower way of living than themselves — to find out why humans live without much confusion.

Finally, the elder wizards send a family of wizards selected through a screening process to the human world. What will happen to the wizard family who have lost their emotions such as sadness, joy, happiness, and love due to the old magic world?

== Cast ==
- Oh Seung-yoon as Ma Soo-ri
- Yoon Young-ah as Ma ye-ye
- Kim Sung-kyum as Ma Pa-ram
- Kim Kyu-chul as Ma Poong-woon
- Kim Na-woon as Ahn Ji-ni
- Park Chung-sun as Ma Pae
- Go Doo-ok as Lee Gang-ho
- Kim Hee-jung as Choi Yi-seul
- Han Bo-bae as Choi Pool-ip
- Lee Hong-gi as Kim Ji-hoon
- Lee David
