= A Company Man =

2012 South Korean film by Im Sang-yoon

- Theatrical release poster
- Directed by: Im Sang-yoon
- Written by: Im Sang-yoon
- Produced by: Oh Joo-hyeon; Yu Jeong-hoon; Jeong Yong-wook
- Starring: So Ji-sub; Lee Mi-yeon; Kwak Do-won; Lee Geung-young; Kim Dong-jun
- Cinematography: Lee Hyung-deok
- Edited by: Nam Na-yeong
- Music by: Mowg
- Distributed by: Showbox/Mediaplex
- Release date: 11 October 2012
- Running time: 96 minutes
- Country: South Korea
- Language: Korean
- Budget: ₩4 billion
- Box office: US$7.3 million

A Company Man (Korean: 회사원; RR: Hoesawon) is a 2012 South Korean action drama thriller film starring So Ji-sub, Lee Mi-yeon, Kwak Do-won and Kim Dong-jun. It follows a hitman who finds himself targeted by his ex-employers after he falls in love with a single mother and quits his job.

A Company Man was released in South Korean theatres on 11 October 2012. American distribution company Well Go USA Entertainment released the film in American theatres on 27 August 2013.

== Plot ==
Ji Hyeong-do works for a metal fabrication company which is a front for their assassination trade. Hyeong-Do is one of the most skilled assassins. One day, Hyeong-do is assigned to get rid of his young partner Ra-Hun, after finishing their assigned hit. Ra Hun asks Hyeong-Do to give money to his family as a favor.

Hyeong-do visits Ra Hun's home, where he meets Ra Hun's mother Yu Mi-Yeon, a former singer, and falls in love with her. When Hyeong-do's colleague wants to quit his job at the company as his job has become meaningless to him after his son's death. Hyeong-do is assigned the task of finishing him, but finds himself in a life crisis as well and his bonding with Mi-Yeon is increasing day by day.

The company's boss thinks very highly of him, even though his direct superior, Kwon has a problem with him. Eventually, Hyeong-Do's crisis makes him end up in a situation in which he becomes disloyal to the company and suddenly finds himself to become the target of his former employees.

Learning this, Hyeong-go and Mi-Yeon leave for a safe place to start a new life, but Kwon and his colleagues catch up to him and kill Mi-Yeon in front of him and shoots Hyeong-Do, who survives and leaves for his office where he intends to finish them and a shootout ensues, in which Hyeong-Do finishes the assassins and Kwon. Later, the police surround the building, and Hyeong-Do surrenders to the police.

== Cast ==
- So Ji-sub as Ji Hyeong-do
- Lee Mi-yeon - Yoo Mi-yeon
- Kwak Do-won - Kwon Jong-tae
- Lee Geung-young as Ban Ji-hoon, department head
- Kim Dong-jun as Ra Hoon
- Han Bo-bae as Ra Bo-seul
- Yoo Ha-bok as Jin Chae-gook, department head
- Yoo Na-mi as Miss Ahn, receptionist
- Hong Kyung-yeon as Yang, chief of the equipment materials team
- Jeon Guk-hwan as Representative Jeon
- Lee Jae-yoon as Shin Ip-nam, sales
- Park Ji-soo as Dispensary employee

== Reception ==
The film achieved one million admissions 12 days after its release. It was sold to 55 countries including Japan, China, Thailand in Asia, as well as France, Switzerland, Austria, the Netherlands and Belgium in Europe.
