= Jung Suk-won =

South Korean actor (born 1985)

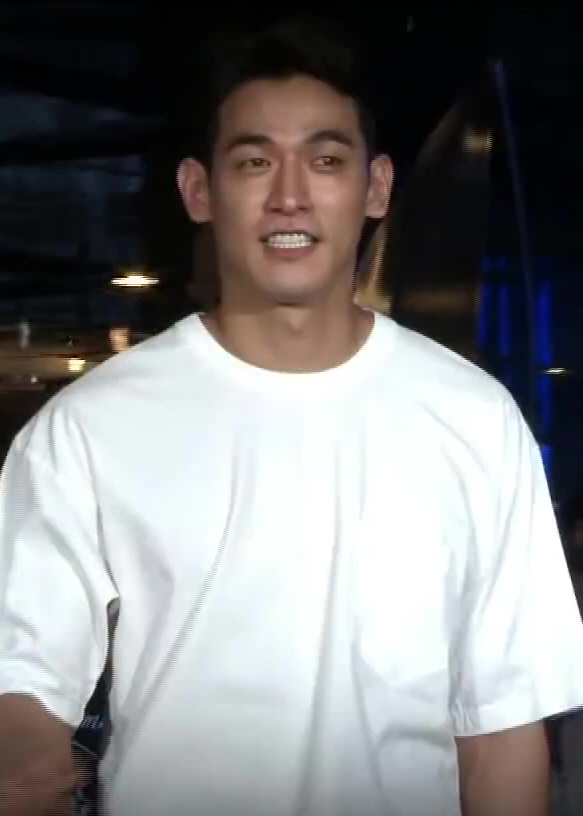
- Jung in 2014
- Born: May 16, 1985 (age 41); Incheon, South Korea
- Other name: Jeong Seok-won
- Education: Incheon City College - Martial Arts
- Occupation: Actor
- Years active: 2008–present
- Agent: C-JeS Entertainment
- Spouse: Baek Ji-young (m. 2013)
- Children: 1

Korean name
- Hangul: 정석원
- RR: Jeong Seokwon
- MR: Chŏng Sŏgwŏn

Jung Suk-won (Korean: 정석원; born May 16, 1985) is a South Korean actor. He began his entertainment career as a stuntman with the Seoul Action School after being discharged from the Marines, then turned to modeling and acting, notably in the television series Rooftop Prince, and Haeundae Lovers.

== Personal life ==
=== Marriage and family ===
Jung began dating singer Baek Ji-young in 2011, and the couple married on June 2, 2013, at the Sheraton Grande Walkerhill. On 22 May 2017, the couple's first child, a daughter named Jung Ha-im was born.

== Filmography ==
=== Television series ===
Year	Title	Role
2007	Belle	
2008	The Great King, Sejong	
2008	Kokkiri (Elephant)	
2008	Aquarius	
2008	Fight	
2008	Working Mom	Swimming pool lifeguard
2008	Worlds Within	Yoo Chi-han
2009	Brilliant Legacy	Jin Young-seok
2009	High Kick Through the Roof	Medical intern (cameo, episode 112)
2009	Creating Destiny	Jung Gyu-hwan
2010	Dr. Champ	Yoo Sang-bong
2011	Drama Special "White Christmas"	Yoon Jong-il
2011	Midas	Kang Jae-beom
2011	Ojakgyo Family	Kim Je-ha
2012	Rooftop Prince	Woo Yong-sool
2012	Lovers of Haeundae	Choi Joon-hyuk
2013	Iris II: New Generation	young Baek San (guest)
2014	Mr. Back	Jung Yi-gun
2017	Bad Guys 2	
2019–2020	Kingdom	Beom-il
2021	Kingdom: Ashin of the North	Beom-il

=== Web series ===
Year	Title	Role	Notes	Ref.
2023	Sweet Home	Min Seo-jin	Season 2–3	

=== Film ===
Year	Title	Role
2008	Fate	
2008	Public Enemy Returns	
2008	The Divine Weapon	
2011	The Beast	Kang Tae-hoon
2011	Secrets, Objects	Lee Woo-sang
2012	R2B: Return to Base	Choi Min-ho
2015	The Long Way Home	Senior lieutenant ("sangwi")
2015	The Tiger: An Old Hunter's Tale	Ryu

=== Variety shows ===
Year	Title
2009	Let's Go Dream Team! Season 2
2012	Real Mate in Australia, Rooftop Prince Trio
2013	Law of the Jungle in New Zealand

=== Music video appearances ===
Year	Song title	Artist
2012	"Daydream"	Park Gyu-ri

== Awards ==
Year	Award	Category	Nominated work	Result
2010	2nd Korea Jewelry Awards	Topaz Award	—N/a	Won
