= Ricky Kim =

Korean-American model and actor

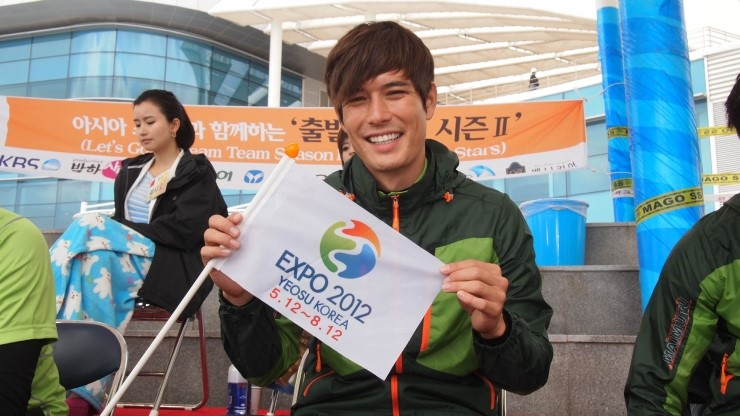
- Born: Ricky Lee Neely; June 19, 1981 (age 45); Dighton, Kansas, United States
- Education: Kansas State University; Journalism and Mass Communications
- Years active: 2006–present
- Agent: Bonboo Entertainment
- Spouse: Ryu Seung-joo (m. 2009)
- Children: 3

Korean name
- Hangul: 김경호
- RR: Gim Gyeongho
- MR: Kim Kyŏngho

Ricky Lee Neely, known professionally as Ricky Kim (Korean: 리키 김; born June 19, 1981), is an American actor.

== Career ==
Ricky Lee Neely was born on June 19, 1981, to a Korean mother and an American father. He grew up in Kansas and Hawaii, and then studied mass communications at Kansas State University, with ambitions of becoming a lobbyist. In 2005 he arrived in South Korea to volunteer and teach English on the side, then left the country to continue traveling around the world. But having made the decision to pursue a career in entertainment, he returned four months later and began handing out his profile to modeling and talent agencies. Under the stage name Ricky Kim, he made his acting debut in the 4-episode 2006 TV series Miracle. He first attracted notice for his supporting role in the 2008 hit show On Air, followed by his first leading role in the romantic comedy film My Darling FBI. He then joined the cast as Michelle Morris in the 2009 Korean staging of the musical Dreamgirls. In the 2010 period medical drama Jejungwon, he played Dr. John William Heron, Presbyterian missionary and hospital director of the first Western medical institution in Korea.

Since 2009 he has been a regular on sports-reality show Let's Go Dream Team! Season 2. He also appeared in several seasons of Law of the Jungle, a travel-reality show in which a cast of celebrities go to exotic locations such as Namibia, Papua, Vanuatu, Siberia, Madagascar, and New Zealand, and are left to explore and survive in nature.

== Personal life ==
Kim met musical theatre actress Ryu Seung-joo while working with Compassion, an international NGO both are active in. After dating for two years, the couple married on May 4, 2009 at Sheraton Grande Walkerhill Hotel. Their first child, daughter Taylor (Kim Tae-rin) was born on February 10, 2011. Their second child, son Asher William (Kim Tae-oh) was born on March 11, 2013. Their third child, daughter Ellysen Victoria (Kim Tae-ra) was born on September 19, 2015.

== Filmography ==
=== Television series ===
- Beating Again (jTBC, 2015) - Wigo (cameo, ep 4)
- Cunning Single Lady (MBC, 2014) - Yeo-jin's first love
- The Queen's Classroom (MBC, 2013) - Justin
- I Need Romance (tvN, 2011) - Alex
- KBS Drama Special "Perfect Spy" (KBS2, 2011) - Eric
- Midas (SBS, 2011) - Stephan Lee
- Athena: Goddess of War (SBS, 2010-2011) - Viktor Sevcenkov / Sasha
- Jejungwon (SBS, 2010) - Dr. John W. Heron
- Heading to the Ground (MBC, 2009) - Maxim
- On Air (SBS, 2008) - Aidan Lee
- Miracle (MBC, 2006) - Jang-mi's boyfriend

=== Film ===
- My Darling FBI (2008) - Albert Lee
- D-War (2007)

=== Variety show ===
- Return of Superman (KBS ep 223, 2018)
- True Dad Confession (JTBC ep 101, 2018)
- Off to School (JTBC, 2015)
- Oh! My Baby (SBS, 2014)
- Law of the Jungle (SBS, 2011-2013)
- Smart Bus (Channel IT, 2011)
- Let's Go Dream Team! Season 2 (KBS2, 2009–2016)
- I Need Family Season 3 (MBC Every 1, 2009)
- Park So-hyun's Secret Garden (DongA TV, 2008)
- Delicious Food (Arirang TV, 2006)
- Running Man (SBS ep 144, 2013)
