= Kim Dong-jun =

South Korean singer and actor

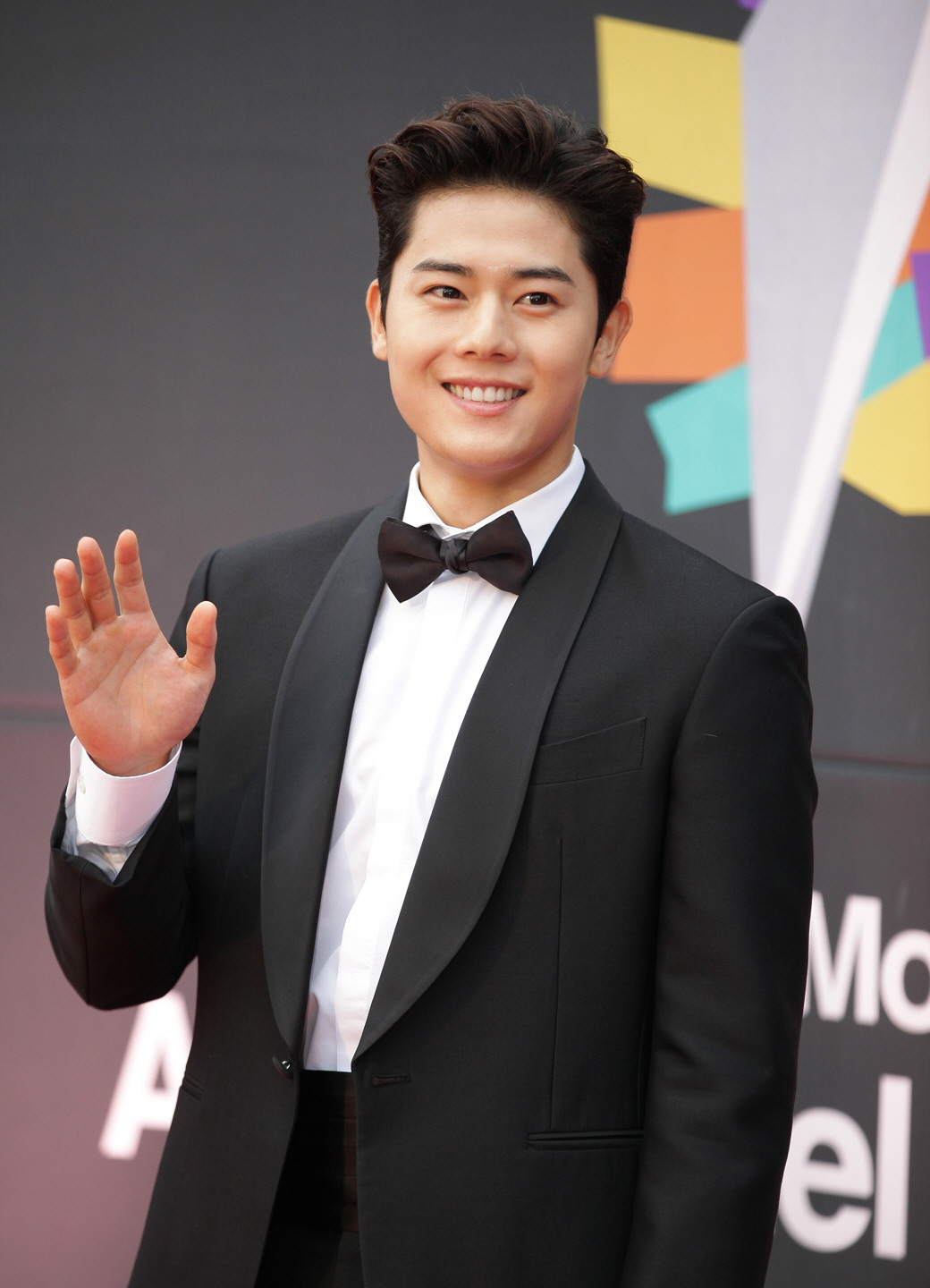
- Kim in June 2017
- Born: February 11, 1992 (age 34); Busan, South Korea
- Occupations: Singer; actor
- Musical career
- Genre: K-pop
- Instrument: Vocals
- Years active: 2010–present
- Labels: Star Empire; Major9
- Member of: ZE:A; ZE:A Five; ZE:A J

Korean name
- Hangul: 김동준
- Hanja: 金桐俊
- RR: Gim Dongjun
- MR: Kim Tongjun

Kim Dong-jun (born February 11, 1992), also known as just Dongjun, is a South Korean singer and actor. He debuted as member of boy group ZE:A (and later its subgroup ZE:A Five and ZE:A J). Apart from his group's activities, he has established himself as an actor, notably through his participation in various television dramas such as The Fugitive of Joseon (2013), Neighborhood Lawyer Jo Deul-ho (2016), Black (2017) and About Time (2018). He has also starred in films such as A Company Man (2012), Take My Hand (2014), and Dead Again (2017).

== Career ==
=== ZE:A ===
Kim joined a nine-member group called "Children of Empire". In 2009. The group started in Mnet as "Children of Empire" and "Children of Empire Returns", and toured South Korea doing guerilla performances. Later the group faced controversy in December 2009 following the similarities of the group's name to Brown Eyed Girls' JeA. The group later changed the pronunciation of the name to avoid implications. On January 7, 2010, the group debuted with their EP, Nativity under the name ZE:A.

ZE:A J solo project has released solo track for Kevin, Heechul and Dongjun. Dongjun was the last member to release solo track "Healing" on May 3. The track was composed and written by himself.

=== Other activities ===
Kim made many appearances in Let's Go Dream Team Season 2 as a Dream Team member.

Kim won two gold medals in the Idol Athletes Chuseok Special on August 27, 2011, in men's 100-meter and 110-meter hurdles against other idols.

Kim was appointed as a torch bearer at the 17th Asian Incheon Games 2014.

=== 2017–present ===
In June 2017, Kim joined Gold Moon Entertainment after his contract with Star Empire Entertainment ended. The CEO of his new agency was ZE:A's former manager, Hwang Jung-moon. In August 2017, it was reported that Gold Moon Entertainment, The Vibe Entertainment and Asakusa Games had merged and now operate under the name "Major 9."

In July 2017, it was reported that Kim was set to star OCN's new drama, Black, portraying a second generation chaebol.

In May 2018, Kim starred on tvN's drama About Time portraying a musical director who is known for his genius abilities, but lacking humanity.

Kim has been a cast member of the TV show Delicious Rendezvous since December 2019.

== Personal life ==
Kim enlisted as an active duty soldier on July 12, 2021. He completed basic military training in first place and was selected as a special warrior. He served as an assistant instructor at the Korea Army Training Center.

While serving in the military, Kim appeared in the 5th episode of tvN variety program The Backpacker Chef which aired on June 23, 2022. At that time, he had been promoted to a corporal and was serving as an assistant in the 1st Infantry Recruit Training Battalion. He was discharged on January 11, 2023.

== Discography ==
=== Singles ===
Song Title	Year	Notes
As lead artist
"Healing" (feat. Jang)	2016	Digital Single
As featured artist
"Burning Down" (Sori feat. Dongjun)	2009	
Collaborations
"Take My Hand" (with SoReal)	2014	Climb the Sky Walls OST

== Filmography ==
=== Films ===
Year	Title	Role	Notes	Ref.
2011	Ronin Pop	Ape		
2012	A Company Man	Ra-hoon	Supporting role	
2014	Take My Hand	Tae-ho		
2017	Dead Again	Jeong Hoon		
2021	Way Station	Sung Hyun		

=== Television series ===
Year	Title	Role	Notes	Ref.
2010	Prosecutor Princess	Minor in Club	Cameo (Ep.2–3)	
2010	Marry Me, Please	Trainee	Cameo (Ep.18)	
2010	Gloria	Singer trainee	Cameo (Ep. 11, 14)	
2011	Crossing the Youngdo Bridge	Oh Ji-hoon		
2011	Girl K	Go Min-young		
2012	You Who Rolled in Unexpectedly	ZE:A Member	Cameo (Ep. 39)	
2013	The Fugitive of Joseon	Mu Myeong	Cameo	
2013	The Clinic for Married Couples: Love and War	Seo Min-jae		
2014	Climb The Sky Walls	Tae-ho		
2014	Boarding House 24th St.	Himself		
2016	My Lawyer, Mr. Jo	Kim Yoo-shin		
2016	Still Loving You	Yoon Soo-ho		
2017	Black	Oh Man-soo		
2018	About Time	Jo Jae-yoo		
2019	Chief of Staff	Han Do-kyeong		
2020	More Than Friends	Ohn Joon-Soo		
2021	Joseon Exorcist	Byeo Ri		
2023	Korea–Khitan War	Hyeonjong of Goryeo		

=== Web series ===
Year	Title	Role	Notes	Ref.
2014	Aftermath	Ahn Dae-yong		
2015	About Love (2nd story: Secret Love)	Jun-woo	Supporting role	
2015	Selection	Choi Min-hyeok		
2016	Happy Hostage	Hong Chan		
2021	Dramaworld 2		Cameo (Ep. 6)	
2021	Summer Guys	Jake	Cameo (Ep. 10)	

=== Variety shows ===
Year	Title	Role	Notes	Ref.
2010	Idol United	Celebrity Team member		
2010–2015	Let's Go! Dream Team Season 2	Dream Team member (semi-fixed)		
2014	Law of the Jungle: Borneo	Cast Member		
2015	Real Men (Season 2): Marine Corps Special	Cast Member		
2016	King of Mask Singer	Contestant (A Day's Trip Chuncheon Station)	Episode 84	
2018	Law of the Jungle: Patagonia	Cast Member		
2019	The More You Eat With Don Spike	Cast Member	Episode 1–4	
2019–2021	Delicious Rendezvous	Cast Member	Episode 1–78	

== Musical ==
Year	Title	Role	Notes	Ref.
2011	Aladdin	Aladdin	Lead role	
2012	Catch Me If You Can	Frank	Lead role	
2014	Goong	Lee Shin	Lead role	
2014	All Shook Up	Elvis	Lead role	

== Awards ==
Year	Ceremony	Category	Nominated work	Result
2015	9th Annual Daegu International Musical Festival	Newcomer Award	All Shook Up	Won
2017	Asia Model Awards	Popular Star Award	—N/a	Won
2017	2017 KBS Drama Awards	Excellence Award, Actor in a Daily Drama	Still Loving You	Nominated
2019	2019 SBS Entertainment Awards	Best Challenge Award	Delicious Rendezvous	Won
2023	2023 KBS Drama Awards	Top Excellence Award, Actor	Korea–Khitan War	Won
2023	2023 KBS Drama Awards	Excellence Award, Actor in a Serial Drama	Korea–Khitan War	Nominated
2023	2023 KBS Drama Awards	Popularity Award, Actor	Korea–Khitan War	Nominated
2023	2023 KBS Drama Awards	Best Couple Award	Kim Dong-jun (with Choi Soo-jong); Korea–Khitan War	Won
2024	10th APAN Star Awards	Excellence Award, Actor in a Serial Drama	Korea–Khitan War	Won
