= Lee Pa-ni =

South Korean model and actress

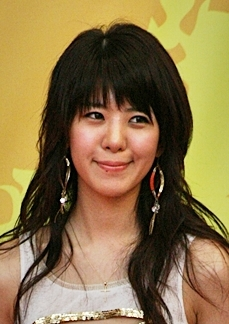
- Lee Pa-ni in 2008.
- Born: January 22, 1986 (age 39)
- Occupation(s): Model, actress
- Children: 1
- Modeling information
- Height: 174 cm (5.71 ft)

Korean name
- Hangul: 이파니
- Hanja: 李琶膩
- RR: I Pani
- MR: I P'ani

Lee Pa-ni (born January 22, 1986) is a South Korean model and actress. In 2006, she was selected as the winner of Spice TV’s Playboy 2006 Korea Model Contest. She is often reported to be the first Korean model to appear in the magazine; however, that distinction goes to Lee Sa-bi.

== See also ==
- List of South Korean models
- Contemporary culture of South Korea
