= ZE:A discography =

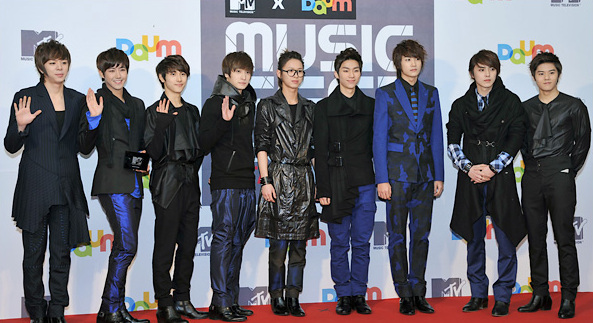
- ZE:A in 2011
- Studio albums: 3
- Extended plays: 4
- Compilation albums: 2
- Singles: 14
- Video albums: 9
- Single albums: 4

South Korean boy group ZE:A (also known as (Children of Empire, Korean: 제국의 아이들) have released three studio albums, four single albums, two compilation albums, four extended plays, nine video albums, and fourteen singles.

== Albums ==
=== Studio albums ===
Title	Details	Peak chart positions		Sales
Title	Details	KOR	JPN	Sales
Lovability	Released: March 17, 2011 (KOR); Label: Star Empire Entertainment; Format: CD, digital download	63	—	
Spectacular	Released: July 4, 2012 (KOR); Label: Star Empire Entertainment; Format: CD, digital download	3	—	KOR: 14,986
Phoenix	Released: August 24, 2012 (JPN); Label: IMX Inc.; Format: CD, digital download	—	13	
"—" denotes releases that did not chart or were not released in that region.

=== Single albums ===
Title	Details	Peak chart positions	Sales
Title	Details	KOR	Sales
Nativity	Released: January 7, 2010 (KOR); Label: Star Empire Entertainment; Format: CD, digital download	4	
Leap for Detonation	Released: March 25, 2010 (KOR); Label: Star Empire Entertainment; Format: CD, digital download	5	
Exciting!	Released: July 8, 2011 (KOR); Label: Star Empire Entertainment; Format: CD, digital download	6	KOR: 8,394
Phoenix	Released: August 27, 2012 (KOR); Label: Star Empire Entertainment; Format: CD, digital download	4	KOR: 5,138

=== Compilation albums ===
Title	Details	Peak chart positions		Sales
Title	Details	KOR	JPN	Sales
ZE:A!	Released: September 22, 2010 (JPN); Label: IMX Inc.; Format: CD, digital download	—	15	
Continue	Released: September 18, 2015 (KOR); Label: Star Empire Entertainment; Format: CD, digital download	6	—	KOR: 2,582
"—" denotes releases that did not chart or were not released in that region.

== Extended plays ==
Title	Details	Peak chart positions		Sales
Title	Details	KOR	JPN	Sales
Here I Am (ヒア・アイ・アム)	Released: April 27, 2011 (JPN); Label: IMX Inc.; Format: CD, digital download	—	23	
Watch Out!～熱愛注意報～	Released: September 5, 2011 (JPN); Label: IMX Inc.; Format: CD, digital download	—	6	
Illusion	Released: August 9, 2013 (KOR), November 27, 2013 (JPN); Label: Star Empire Entertainment; Format: CD, digital download	6	27	KOR: 41,221
First Homme	Released: June 2, 2014 (KOR); Label: Star Empire Entertainment; Format: CD, digital download	2	—	KOR: 17,742
"—" denotes releases that did not chart or were not released in that region.

== Singles ==
Title	Year	Peak chart positions			Sales	Album
Title	Year	KOR	KOR Hot	JPN	Sales	Album
"Mazeltov"	2010	48	—	—		Nativity
"All Day Long" (하루종일)	2010	38	—	—		Leap for Detonation
"Level Up" (이별드립)	2010	56	—	—		Lovability
"Love☆Letter" (ラヴ☆レター)	2010	—	—	9		Non-album single
"Here I Am"	2011	42	—	—	KOR: 190,656	Lovability
"Watch Out!"	2011	58	—	—	KOR: 287,131	Exciting
"Daily Daily"	2011	—	—	21		Non-album single
"Aftermath"	2012	29	26	—	KOR: 784,316	Spectacular
"Phoenix"	2012	51	74	—	KOR: 63,265	Phoenix
"D.D.Dance"	2012	—	—	28		Non-album singles
"Beautiful Lady" (아리따운 걸)	2012	65	71	—	KOR: 113,007	Non-album singles
"The Ghost Of The Wind" (바람의 유령)	2013	21	17	—	KOR: 258,067	Illusion
"Breathe" (숨소리)	2014	34	—	—	KOR: 105,627	First Homme
"Continue"	2015	—	—	—		Continue
"—" denotes releases that did not chart or were not released in that region.

== Other charted songs ==
Title	Year	Peak chart positions		Sales	Album
Title	Year	KOR	KOR Hot	Sales	Album
"Step By Step"	2013	57	40		Illusion

== Other appearances ==
Title	Year	Other artist(s)
"승리하리라(Seunriharira)"	2010	Big Brother
"Shooting Star"	2011	Star Empire
"Win the Day"	2012	Team SIII
"D.D.Dance"	2012	—N/a

== Soundtrack appearances ==
Title	Year	Album	Other artist(s)
"왜 몰랐을까 (Why Didn't I Realize)"	2010	Chosun Police Season 3 OST	Choi Hyun-joon
"Run to the World"	2011	The Kick OST	—N/a
"Run to the World (Rock ver.)"	2011	The Kick OST	—N/a
"Invincible"	2011	Ronin Pop OST	—N/a

== Video albums ==
Title	Details	Peak chart positions
Title	Details	JPN
Seoul Train with ZE:A	Released: June 2, 2010; Label: Star Empire Entertainment, IMX Inc.; Format: DVD	—
First Event & Live DVD in Yokohama & Osaka	Released: August 30, 2010; Label: Star Empire Entertainment, IMX Inc.; Format: DVD	—
Special Live -Love Letter for You- in Tokyo	Released: May 25, 2011; Label: Star Empire Entertainment, IMX Inc.; Format: DVD	89
Happy ZE:A's Day 2011 : ZE:A 1st Fan Meeting	Released: October 28, 2011; Labels: Star Empire Entertainment, IMX Inc.; Format: DVD	132
ZE:A's World and Super Live	Released: February 29, 2012; Label: Star Empire Entertainment, IMX Inc.; Format: DVD	—
Yokohama Concert	Released: July 26, 2012; Labels: Star Empire Entertainment, IMX Inc.; Format: DVD	—
The Huis Ten Bosch Story	Released: July 26, 2012; Labels: Star Empire Entertainment, IMX Inc.; Format: DVD	
Spectacular : Album Showcase, Fighting Project in Korea	Released: January 23, 2013; Labels: Star Empire Entertainment, IMX Inc.; Format: DVD	273
ZE:A History Empire of ZE:A 2012-2013 in Japan	Released: July 18, 2013; Labels: Star Empire Entertainment, IMX Inc.; Format: DVD	—
"—" denotes releases that did not chart or were not released in that region.

== Sub-unit discography ==
ZE:A has debuted three sub-units: ZE:A Five, ZE:A 4U, and ZE:A J.

ZE:A Five includes members Kevin, Siwan, Minwoo, Hyungsik, and Dongjun. ZE:A 4U includes members, Junyoung, Kwanghee, Heechul, and Taeheon. And ZE:A J includes members Kevin, Taeheon, Heechul, Minwoo, and Dongjun.

=== Extended plays ===
Title	Details	Peak chart positions		Sales
Title	Details	KOR	JPN	Sales
Voulez-Vous (as ZE:A Five)	Released: March 25, 2013 (KOR); Label: Star Empire Entertainment; Format: CD, digital download	5	—	KOR: 6,730
Just Tonight (as ZE:A J)	Released: May 2, 2016 (JPN); Label: Universal Music; Format: CD, digital download	—	30	
"—" denotes releases that did not chart or were not released in that region.

=== Singles ===
Title	Year	Peak chart positions		Sales	Album
Title	Year	KOR	JPN	Sales	Album
"The Day We Broke Up" (헤어지던 날) (as ZE:A Five)	2013	42	—		Voulez-Vous
"The Classic" (as ZE:A Five)	2013	—	12		Non-album singles
"Oops !! ~ アプサ!! ~" (as ZE:A 4U)	2013	—	33		Non-album singles
"Roulette" (ルーレット) (as ZE:A J)	2015	—	18		Non-album singles
"Marry Me" (as ZE:A J)	2015	—	—		Non-album singles
"君のそばに～Love to you～" (as ZE:A J)	2015	—	22		Non-album singles
"—" denotes releases that did not chart or were not released in that region.

=== Video albums ===
Title	Details
ZE:A Five Special DVD Thank You for ZE:A's	Released: April 24, 2013; Labels: Star Empire Entertainment, IMX Inc.; Format: DVD
