= Ha Dong-kyun =

Ha Dong Qn
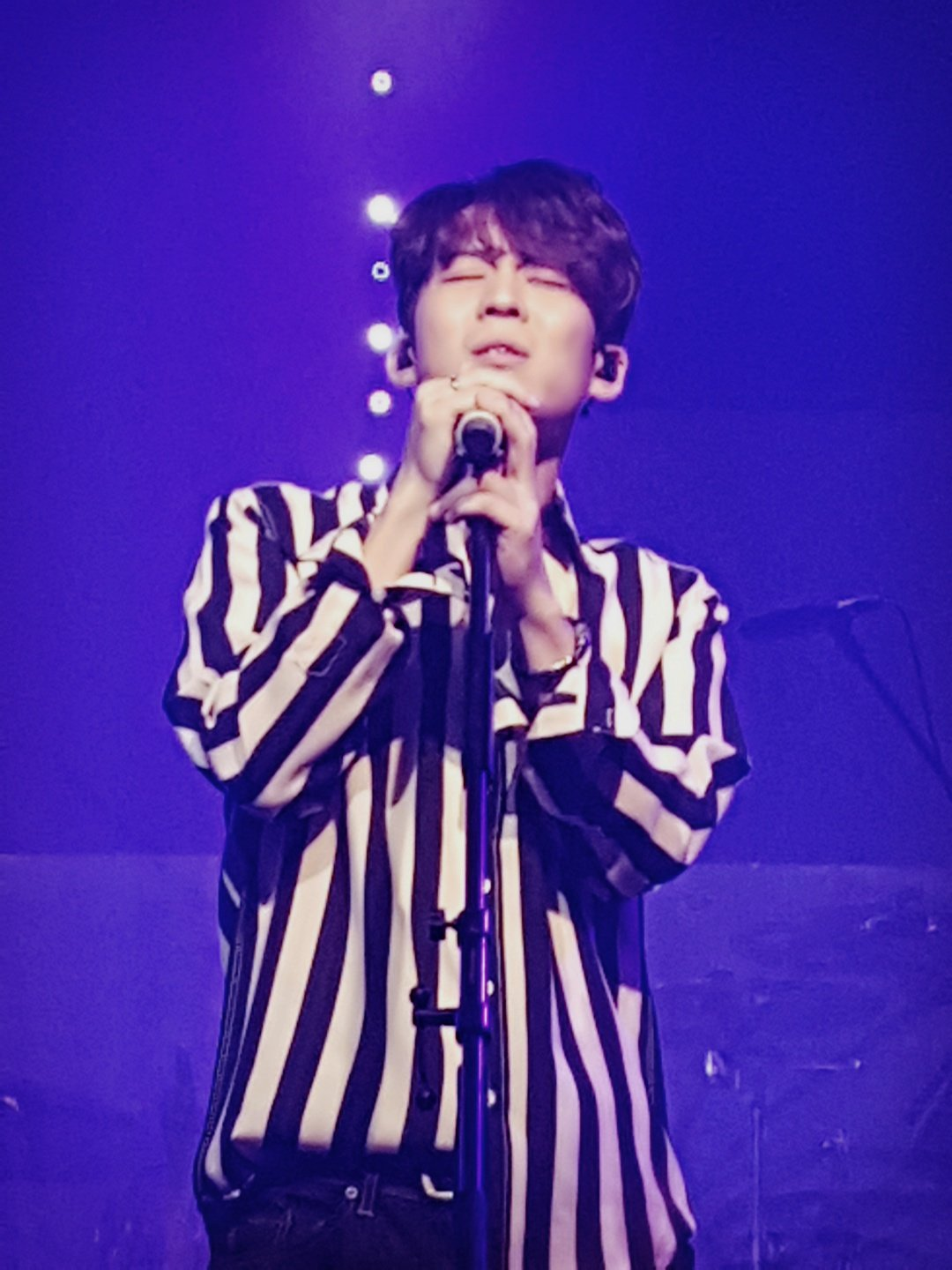
- At The 2nd Night (Solo Concert, 2017)

Background information
- Also known as: Ha Dong Qn
- Born: June 28, 1980 (age 46); South Korea
- Genres: R&B, ballad, rock
- Occupations: Singer-songwriter
- Years active: 2002–present
- Labels: YG Entertainment; WS Entertainment; Louders Entertainment; Mark Planet
- Formerly of: 7Dayz; Wanted
- Website: Mark Planet Official website

Ha Dong-kyun (Korean: 하동균; born June 28, 1980), officially known as Ha Dong Qn, is a South Korean singer-songwriter. He debuted in 2002 as a member of the short-lived boy band 7Dayz, before joining the boy band Wanted in 2004. As a solo singer, he has released two albums: Stand Alone (2006) and Another Corner (2008), and three extended plays: Mark (2012), Word (2014), and Polygon (2017).

== Career ==
Dong Qn embarked on his career as a solo singer with the release of his first album Stand Alone in 2006. He has since followed his debut album with the release of his second full-length album Another Corner (2008) as well as multiple singles and mini albums including Mark (2012) and Word (2014). Dong Qn attracted substantial audience attention from his appearance on a popular South Korean singing competition TV program I Am a Singer (Season 3, aired in 2015). In 2016, Ha Dong Qn founded the independent record label Mark Planet, under which he then released his new mini album Polygon, consisting of five single tracks, on May 11, 2017. Getting rave reviews for his new album, he held a very successful first solo concert Night: The First on June 4, 2017, and continued advancing his career by participating in a variety of popular music events, such as the Someday Festival in Seoul, the Yoo Jae-ha Music Contest, and several benefit performances for people in need. He successfully put on the second concert of his solo concert series, 02 Night: Secret Room, on December 10, 2017, and has since followed that up with more TV appearances, his participation in the Kim Kwang-seok Memorial Concert series (김광석 다시부르기), and other live performances.

He released single named "그때 우린" on April 18, 2019, declaring the news of a soon-to be-released new album.

== Discography ==
=== Studio albums ===
Title	Album details	Peak chart positions	Sales
Title	Album details	KOR	Sales
Stand Alone	Released: June 27, 2006; Label: WS Entertainment; Format: CD, cassette	9	KOR: 28,456+
Another Corner	Released: February 14, 2008; Label: WS Entertainment; Format: CD, cassette	4	KOR: 9,246+

=== Extended plays ===
Title	Album details	Peak chart positions	Sales
Title	Album details	KOR	Sales
Mark	Released: December 17, 2012; Label: WS Entertainment; Format: CD, digital download	19	KOR: 1,297+
Word	Released: October 14, 2014; Label: Louders Entertainment; Format: CD, digital download	18	KOR: 1,094+
Polygon	Released: May 11, 2017; Label: Mark Planet; Format: CD, digital download	15	KOR: 1,319+

=== Singles ===
Title	Year	Peak chart positions	Sales	Album
Title	Year	KOR	Sales	Album
"Monolog" (넋두리)	2006	No data	No data	Stand Alone
"Please Love Her" (그녀를 사랑해줘요)	2006	No data	No data	Stand Alone
"Butterfly" (나비야)	2008	No data	No data	Another Corner
"Come Rain Or Come Shine" (비가 오나 눈이 오나)	2008	No data	No data	Another Corner
"Sound of Tears" (눈물소리)	2008	No data	No data	Non-album single
"From Mark"	2012	19	KOR: 168,269	Mark
"Run"	2014	—	KOR: 19,973	Word
"Knot" (매듭)	2014	70	KOR: 33,461	Word
"Beautiful Day" (with Lee Jung)	2015	27	KOR: 81,918	Non-album singles
"Beautiful" (그래 사랑이었다) (with GB9)	2017	91	KOR: 19,627	Non-album singles
"The Maze Of Reality" (지금 그리고 우린)	2017	—		Polygon
"Beautiful" (with KIND and Double K)	2019	—		Non-album singles
"Gift" (그때 우린)	2019	—		Non-album singles
"Workaholic" (워커홀릭) (with Yoon Jong-shin)	2019	—		Monthly Project 2019 Yoon Jong Shin
"Never Forget" (with KIND and Loopy)	2019	—		Non-album singles
"Star Dust"	2020	—		Non-album singles
"When We First Met" (처음 그대를 사랑했었던)	2020	—		Non-album singles
"Special Thanks To" (감사해 덕분에) (with Jang Hye-jin)	2020	—		Non-album singles
"Here I Am"	2021	—		Non-album singles
"I Will Be Waiting" (기다릴게) (with Bong-gu)	2021	34		Non-album singles
"ME.N.U" (with Junny)	2021	—		Non-album singles
"Be Myself" (나를) (with Yang Da-il)	2022	195		Non-album singles
"Lavender" (with Kind and Skinny Brown)	2022	—		Non-album singles
"Blue Night Song" (푸른 밤 이 노래) (with Joy)	2023	154		Non-album singles
"I Will" (내가 그댈)	2024	69		Non-album singles
"—" denotes release did not chart.

=== Soundtrack appearances ===
Title	Year	Peak chart positions	Album
Title	Year	KOR	Album
"Always"	2004	No data	Forbidden Love OST
"Star" (별) (with Kim Tae-won)	2004	No data	A Moment to Remember OST
"I Wish"	2006	No data	Invincible Parachute Agent OST
"My One and Only Love" (세상... 단 한번의 사랑)	2007	No data	Crazy For You OST
"I Am Sorry" (미안합니다)	2008	No data	Powerful Opponents OST
"After The Love"	2011	51	Twinkle Twinkle OST
"I Will Be Waiting" (기다릴게) (with Lee Jung)	2011	11	The Princess' Man OST
"Corner of My Heart" (가슴 한쪽)	2012	55	Take Care of Us, Captain OST
"Looks Good" (좋아보여)	2013	29	Good Doctor OST
"To You" (나는 너에게)	2016	—	Wanted OST
"Let's Go Together" (같이 가자)	2018	—	Mother OST
"Home"	2018	—	Life OST
"Don't Remember"	2018	—	Bad Papa OST
"Just Leave Me" (그냥 나를 버려요)	2020	—	The World of the Married OST
"Set Me Free - Night Version"	2020	—	Awaken OST
"My Story" (혼잣말)	2021	—	Lost OST
"Cry Me a River"	2021	—	Show Window: The Queen's House OST
"Killing Me"	2022	—	Again My Life OST
"—" denotes release did not chart.

=== Other charted songs ===
Title	Year	Peak chart positions	Album
Title	Year	KOR	Album
"My Love By My Side" (내 사랑 내 곁에) (original by Kim Hyun-sik)	2015	80	I Am a Singer 3
"Please" (제발) (original by Deulgukhwa)	2015	82	I Am a Singer 3

== Radio ==
- Radio Days, It's Ha Dong Qn, DJ, Apr. 2008 ~ Apr. 2009
- MBC FM4U, Ha Dong Qn's Golden Disk, special DJ, May 2~3rd. 2016
- MBC FM4U, Blue Night, It's Ha Dong Qn, Special DJ, Jan 26~29th. 2017
- MBC FM4U, Blue Night, Special DJ, Sep 25~30th. 2018

== TV appearances ==
- I Am a Singer, Season 3, Jan–Apr 2015
- Mix Nine, November 19, 2017 – January 26, 2018
- I Can See Your Voice, Season 5, April 6, 2018
- The Call, Season 2, Epi.3–10, 2019
- I Can See Your Voice, Season 8, February 19, 2021
- Begin Again - Intermission, Cast Member, spin-off, January 6, 2023

== Concerts ==
- Ha Dong Qn's 1st solo concert, <Below The Surface>, 2011. Sep 17
- Concert for the 3rd album of Wanted, <back to vintage>, 2012. Mar 31
- Ha Dong Qn's solo concert <MARK>, 2013. Dec 31
- Ha Dong Qn's solo concert <WORD>, 2014. Nov 22
- Joint concert of Kim Tae-woo, Baek Ji-young, Ha Dong Qn, <VOICE TO VOICE>, 2014. Dec 24
- Joint Christmas concert of Moon Myung-jin, Ha Dong Qn, Young-ji, <Wishes>, 2014. Dec 26
- Joint concert of Ha Dong Qn, Moon Myung-jin, Young-ji, <Spring Breeze>, 2015. May 16, May 30
- 2015 Seoul Jazz Festival, 2015. May 23, 24, 25
- 2015 Someday Festival, 2015. Dec 5
- 2015 SMF (Special Music Festival), 2015. Sep 6
- Joint Concert of Shin Young-jae, Ha Dong Qn, Young-ji, <Memories>, 2015. Nov 22
- Ha Dong Qn's solo concert <#Blank>, 2015. Nov 29
- LOUDers FAMILY CONCERT, 2015. Dec 12
- HI CONCERT 2016. Feb 12~14
- Hyundai Card Curated 32 – Ha Dong Qn solo concert, 2017 Jan 20~21
- Ha Dong Qn's solo concert <Night: the First>, 2017. Jun 3~4
- 2017 Someday Festival, 2017. Sep 16
- Ha Dong Qn's solo concert <#02 Night: Secret Room>, 2017. Dec 8~10
- Kim Kwang-seok Memorial Concert, 2018 2.3/ 2.10/ 2.24
- Ha Dong Qn's solo concert <Far Closer>, 2018. Mar 31
- May I Love You (book concert), 2018. May 12
- YONSEI Lock (university festival), 2018. May 25
- Angel-in-us Rooftop Coffee Concert (Busan), 2018. Jun 23
- 2018 Someday Festival, 2018. Sep 1
- 2018 Solo Concert, < Ha Dong Qn >, 2018. Dec 8~9
- Live On Stage, <Ha Dong-Qn × Son Seung-Yeon>, 2018. Dec 26
- 2018 Jazz Festival, Stage 5, <Secret Party in Busan>, 2018. Dec 28
- 2019 Solo Concert <Begin>, 2019. Apr 13~14th, Apr 27~28th.
- Yeungnam Univ. Festival, 2019. May 24
- Soribada, 2019 K-WORLD FESTA, K-SOUL, 2019. Aug 18
- JEJU Samda Park Night Concert, 2019. Aug 23
- 2019 Someday Festival, 2019. Aug 31
- 2019 Dodong Seowon Concert (to celebrate the confucian academy was designated as an UNESCO World Heritage World Heritage Site), TV Chosun, 2019. Sep 21
- 2019 Gotjawal Forest Concert in Jeju, 2019. Sep 28
- Hot & Blue Concert, U.S.(CA) 2019. Oct 19
- 2019 Korean Popular Culture And Art Awards, Special Performance, 2019. Oct 30
- 2019 8th GLAD MUSIC FEST in Jeju, < Ha Dong Qn × Punch >, 2019. Nov 24
- 2019 Solo Concert <h.ealing>, 2019. Dec 7–8
- 2020 Daegu Folk Festival, 2020. Jul 30
- 2020 Oesol Hangeul Hanmadang, 2020. Oct 9
- Cinema Concert 2020, 2020. Nov 6
- 6th KIM HYUN SIK MUSIC FESTA, 2020. Nov 20
- Appreciation Concert for Medical Staffs, 2020. Nov 24
- Junggu Culture Joint Concert 2020, 2020. Nov 25
- 2021 SOMEDAY THEATRE CANTABILE, 2021. May 23
- Jeonju Int'l Sori Festival, Starlight Concert, Sep 30
- 2021 Solo Concert <Here I Am>, 2021. Oct 15–17
- 2021 SOMEDAY THEATRE LAST CANTABILE, 2021. Nov 6
