= Lee Jung =

South Korean singer (born 1981)

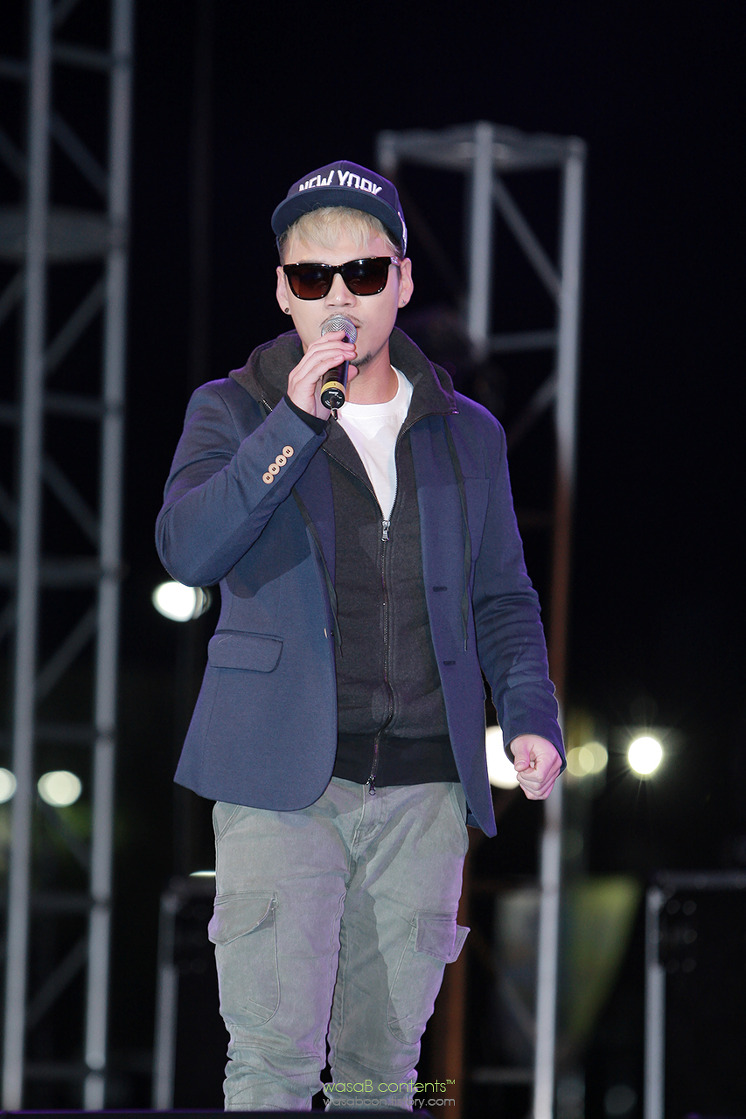
- Lee in 2014

Background information
- Born: Lee Jung-hee; October 24, 1981 (age 44); Seongnam, Gyeonggi Province, South Korea
- Genres: K-pop, R&B
- Occupations: Singer; actor
- Years active: 2002–present

Lee Jung-hee (이정희, born October 24, 1981), better known by his stage name Lee Jung or J. Lee, is a South Korean singer. He made his debut as a member of 7 Dayz; Lee has since become a solo singer. Although his last album has underperformed, he has continued his popularity by becoming a mainstay on KBS's Heroine 6, becoming part of the "Gag Team 3" with Shin Jung Hwan from Country Kko Kko and Kim Jong Min from Koyote.

== Life and career ==
In January 2007, Lee claimed that another singer used his voice to debut. He stated that he heard his recording being used by another artist by viewing the performance on television. He previously thought the song was going to be his debut song to launch his singing career. "Lee Jung lipsynch singer" went on to become most searched keyword at one point.

He joined the Republic of Korea Marine Corps on October 12, 2008.

Lee released his 10th anniversary album Synergy in November 2013, including title track "We Loved Together", which is composed and written by 5 o'clock and features Ha Dong-kyun. The album also includes "Doesn't Make Sense" which was written by Lee Jand and composed by both Lee and Jo Jung-chi, as well as his previous digital single, "I Am Sorry", which received attention for being the work of Brave Brothers, "Did You Ever Love" and "Let's Stay Together".

In July 2015, Lee made an appearance under the pseudonym of "Tungki" on MBC's King of Mask Singer. Tungki came out guns blazing, eliciting a standing ovation from the judges and cheers all around, with a powerful performance of Kim Kyung-ho's "People Who Make Me Sad". With that performance, he successfully toppled "Cleopatra", AKA Kim Yeon-woo, who until then had enjoyed a record 10-week long rein as the "King of Mask" and solidified his reputation as one of Korea's most skilled vocalists.

== Personal life ==
In November 2021, Lee announced on Radio Star television that he had registered his marriage. with his non-celebrity girlfriend and the wedding will take place in May 2022.

== Discography ==
=== Studio albums ===
Title	Album details	Peak chart positions	Sales
Title	Album details	KOR	Sales
Lee Jung	Released: August 5, 2003; Label: CJ Entertainment; Formats: CD, cassette	15	KOR: 39,019
Look At Me	Released: July 12, 2004; Label: CJ Entertainment; Formats: CD, cassette	—	
Rebirth of Regent	Released: April 20, 2006; Label: Media Line; Formats: CD	18	KOR: 7,837
Forth Force	Released: June 5, 2008; Label: Media Line; Formats: CD	—	
"—" denotes a recording that did not chart.

=== Extended plays ===
Title	Album details	Peak chart positions	Sales
Title	Album details	KOR	Sales
Let's Dance	Released: February 8, 2011; Label: Media Line; Formats: CD, download	14	KOR: 2,002
Lee Jung 10th Anniversary Part 02 'Synergy'	Released: November 12, 2013; Label: Studio Teukwal; Formats: CD, download	—	
Leaving Seoul (명가수의 순정) (with Netherlands Tulip Farm)	Released: November 1, 2017; Label: Studio Teukwal; Formats: CD, download	—	
"—" denotes a recording that did not chart.

=== Singles ===
Title	Year	Peak chart positions	Sales	Album
Title	Year	KOR	Sales	Album
"Never Again" (다신)	2003	No data		Lee Jung
"Look At Me" (나를 봐)	2004	No data		Look At Me
"Sigh" (한숨만)	2005	No data		Rebirth Of Regent
"Fever" (열) (feat. Tablo)	2006	No data		Rebirth Of Regent
"Only Looking At You" (그대만 보며)	2008	No data		Forth Force
"Breaking Up" (헤어지는 일) (feat. Leessang)	2010	10	KOR: 988,306	Let's Dance
"Let's Dance"	2011	55		Let's Dance
"Two Farewells" (두 이별) (with Yoon Jong-shin)	2011	66	KOR: 83,165	Monthly Project 2011 Yoon Jong Shin
"Lucky Star" (feat. Ha Dong-kyun)	2011	43	KOR: 258,389	Non-album singles
"Not Anymore" (아니라는데) (with Seo Young-eun)	2012	33	KOR: 415,325	Non-album singles
"Private"	2012	61	KOR: 197,752	Non-album singles
"Have You Fallen In Love" (사랑해 봤니)	2012	17	KOR: 472,288	Lee Jung 10th Anniversary Part 02 'Synergy'
"Let's Stay Together" (같이 있자)	2013	65	KOR: 57,208	Lee Jung 10th Anniversary Part 02 'Synergy'
"I Am Sorry"	2013	21	KOR: 216,257	Lee Jung 10th Anniversary Part 02 'Synergy'
"Where Is The Love" (같이 사랑했는데) (with Ha Dong-kyun)	2013	14	KOR: 258,826	Lee Jung 10th Anniversary Part 02 'Synergy'
"*23#" (별이삼샵) (credited as Ujungran, with Yoo Se-yoon)	2014	— (Note: "*23#" did not enter the Gaon Digital Chart, but it peaked at number 97 on the component Download Chart.)	KOR: 15,851	Non-album singles
"Your Love" (feat. Lisa)	2014	43	KOR: 68,607	Non-album singles
"Tomorrow Without You" (너 없는 내일)	2014	43	KOR: 47,190	Non-album singles
"For The First Time" (아름다워)	2014	92	KOR: 16,892	Non-album singles
"Beautiful Day" (with Ha Dong-kyun)	2015	27	KOR: 81,918	Non-album singles
"Faith Is The Victory"	2015	—		Non-album singles
"Warm Words" (따뜻한 말 한마디)	2017	—		Non-album singles
"Pure Love" (순정) (with Netherlands Tulip Farm)	2017	—		Leaving Seoul
"My Everything"	2021	—		Non-album singles
"I Like You" (아이 라익 그대)	2022	—		Non-album singles
"Come Back" (돌아와요)	2022	—		Non-album singles
"—" denotes a recording that did not chart.

=== Soundtrack appearances ===
Title	Year	Peak chart positions	Sales	Album
Title	Year	KOR	Sales	Album
"Don't Make Me Cry" (날울리지마)	2004	No data		Don't Tell Papa OST
"My Love"	2005	No data		Love Needs a Miracle OST
"Love For You" (그댈 위한 사랑)	2006	No data		Stranger Than Heaven OST
"Lock" (자물쇠)	2006	No data		Lovers OST
"I Love You...So...Farewell" (사랑한다...그래서...이별한다)	2008	No data		Why Did You Come to My House OST
"Believe in Love" (사랑을 믿어요)	2011	32		My Love, My Family OST
"I Will Be Waiting" (기다릴게) (with Ha Dong-kyun)	2011	11	KOR: 1,378,863	The Princess' Man OST
"Crazy for Love" (사랑에 미쳐본다)	2011	16	KOR: 653,374	Vampire Prosecutor OST
"Only You" (오직 그대만)	2012	39	KOR: 204,733	If Tomorrow Comes OST
"Sad Love" (사랑이 서럽다)	2012	29	KOR: 290,704	Music and Lyrics OST
"Wish It Was You" (너였으면 좋겠어)	2013	25	KOR: 121,632	Flower Boys Next Door OST
"Mute" (벙어리)	2013	34	KOR: 139,862	Jang Ok-jung, Living by Love OST
"Forgotten" (잊혀져간다)	2015	— (Note: "Forgotten" did not enter the Gaon Digital Chart, but it peaked at number 98 on the component Download Chart.)	KOR: 16,510	Last OST
"—" denotes a recording that did not chart.

=== Other charted songs ===
Title	Year	Peak chart positions	Sales	Album
Title	Year	KOR	Sales	Album
"Why Is Love" (사랑은 왜)	2011	70		Let's Dance
"Jasmine" (말리꽃) (original by Lee Seung-chul)	2012	7	KOR: 1,137,317	I Am a Singer 2
"Those Days" (그 날들) (original by Kim Kwang-seok)	2012	53	KOR: 73,621	I Am a Singer 2
"You Don't Know" (그대는 모릅니다) (original by Lee Seung-hwan)	2012	42	KOR: 82,581	I Am a Singer 2
"Fate" (인연) (original by Lee Seung-chul)	2013	83	KOR: 31,636	Immortal Songs: Singing the Legend
"Before Sadness Comes" (슬퍼지려 하기전에) (original by Cool)	2013	39	KOR: 38,074	Immortal Songs: Singing the Legend
"I Will" (내가 그댈) (with Lyn and Ha Dong-kyun)	2015	11	KOR: 320,267	CPR Heartsong Special Album Part 1

== Filmography ==
=== Television ===
- Nonstop 5 (2004–2005)
- X-Man (2004)
- Love Letter (2006)
- The Legend of Seven Cutter (2006)
- Unstoppable Marriage (2007)
- Welcome to the Show (2011)
- Vampire Idol (2012)
- Immortal Songs 2 (2011–present)
- King of Mask Singer (2015)
- Where Is My Friend's Home (2015)

== Awards and nominations ==
Year	Award-Giving Body	Category	Work	Result
2003	Mnet Asian Music Awards	Best New Male Artist	"Never" (이정)	Nominated
