= The Clinic for Married Couples: Love and War =

South Korean television program

- Also known as: Couple Clinic: Love and War; Marriage Clinic: Love and War; Couple Court: Love and War
- Genre: Family; Erotica; Domestic
- Created by: KBS
- Country of origin: South Korea
- Original language: Korean
- No. of seasons: 2
- No. of episodes: 479 (season 1); 124 (season 2)

Production
- Executive producer: Park Hyo-kyu
- Producers: Lee Joon-yong; Baek Sun-hye; Kyung Myung-chul; Park Jae-sam
- Running time: 70 minutes
- Production companies: KBS Media (season 1); KBS N, Story TV, Celltrion Entertainment (formerly Dream E&M) (season 2)

Original release
- Network: KBS 2TV
- Release: October 1999 – April 17, 2009

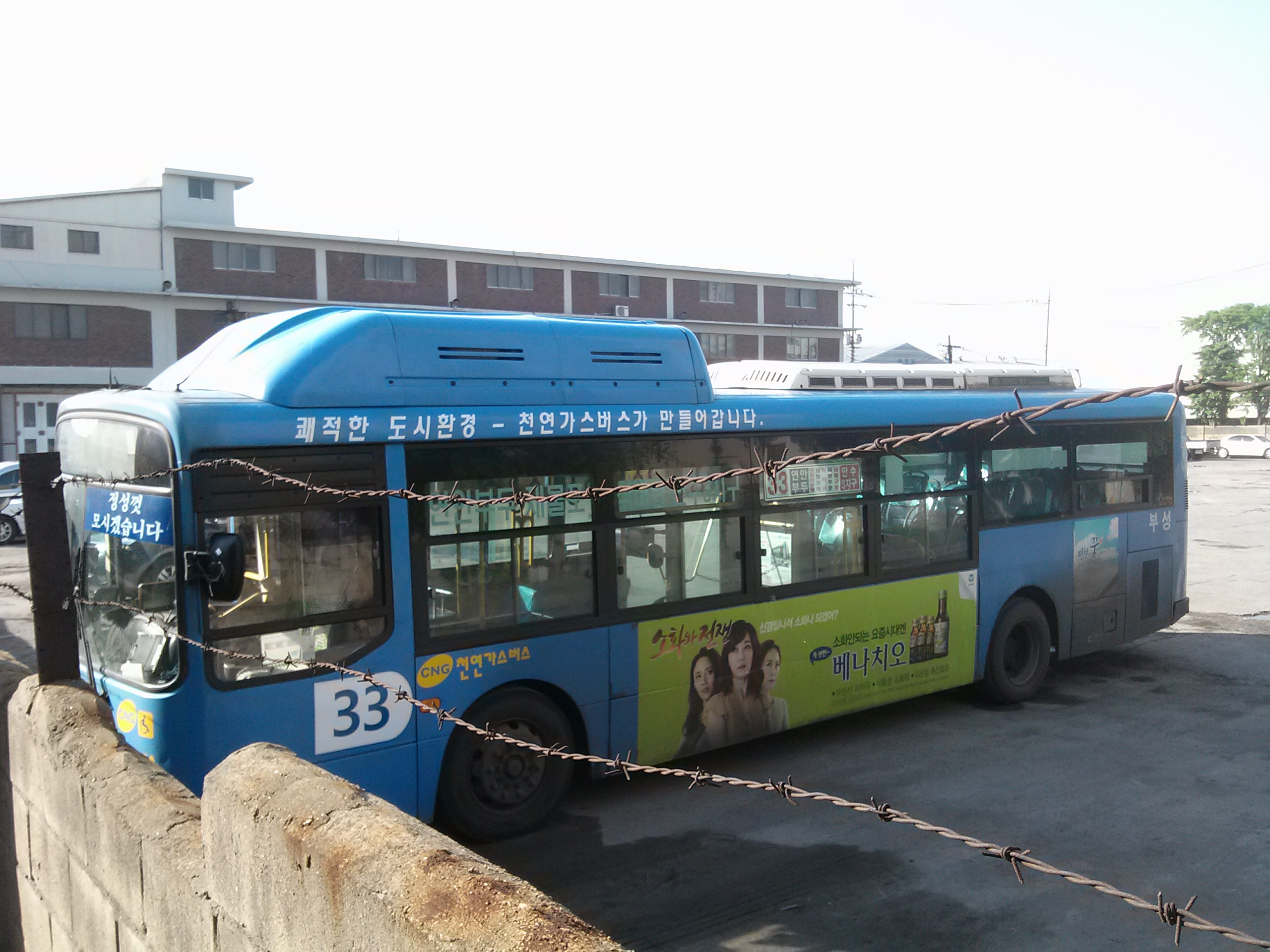
An advertisement of the show on a Incheon City bus

The Clinic for Married Couples: Love and War (Korean: 부부클리닉: 사랑과 전쟁; RR: Bubukeullinik: saranggwa jeonjaeng), also known as Husbands and Wives: Love or War, is a South Korean television program. This omnibus show, broadcast every Friday, depicts the story of a husband and wife who seek divorce, while a panel of judges analyses the marital problems and suggests some solutions that might help the couple rediscover the meaning of marriage.

== Cast ==
=== Season 1 ===
==== Main ====
- Shin Goo as the Chief judge
- Jung Ae-ri as an Associate judge
- Lee Ho-jae as an Associate judge

==== Recurring & Guest ====
- Lee Won-jae
- Choi Sung-joon
- Min Ji-young
- Lee Shi-eun
- Lee Joo-suk
- Yoo Ji-yun
- Jang Hee-soo
- Seo Kwon-soon
- Kim Ae-ran as Ahn Jung-hui
- Lee Sang-mi
- Lee Joo-hwa
- Bae Do-wan
- Baek Joon-ki
- Kim Hee-jung

=== Season 2 ===
==== Main ====
- Jeon Moo-song as Performer / the Chief judge
- Kang Seok-woo as Performer / the Chief judge
- Kang Dong-woo as Human Sexuality expert
- Kim Sook-gi as a Family Counseling expert
- Baek Hye-kyung as a Neuropsychiatry professional
- Lee Myung-sook as Family Law expert

==== Recurring & Guest ====
- Choi Young-wan
- Kim Sun-young
- Han Geu-rim
- Lee Suk-woo
- Lee Jung-hoon
- Kang Moon-hee
- Jung Eun-bi
- Yoon Chul-hyung
- Kim Jung-kyun
- Kim Deok-hyun
- Choi Jung-won
- Lee Shi-eun
- Min Ji-young
- Lee Jung-soo
- Lee Joon-woo
- Kim Nan-ah
- Seo Jun-young
- Kim Dong-hyun
- Narsha
- Boyfriend
- Seo Kwon-soon
- Seo Min-woo
- Lee Sang-mi

=== Idol Special ===
==== Fair Love ====
- Kim Dong-jun as Seo Min-jae
- Kim Ye-won as Yoo Eun-chae
- Son Ji-hyun as Seo Young

==== Because I Love You ====
- G.O as Joo Won
- Go Woo-ri as Go Eun

==== My Girl's Man ====
- Jang Su-won as Joon Hyung
- Yura as Yoo Jung
- Moon Joon-young as Soo Ho

==== Her Choice ====
- Kang Tae-oh as Joo Won
- Oh Seung-ah as Soo Young
- Lee Min-hyuk as Hyun Woo

== Awards and nominations ==
Award	Year	Category	Nominee	Result
KBS Entertainment Awards	2005	Achievement Award	Jung Ae-ri	Won

== Spin-off web series ==
A spin-off web series titled NEW Love and War (NEW 사랑과 전쟁) will be streamed by KakaoTV starting October 14, 2021. Former KBS drama producer Sohn Nam-mok will produce and direct the project.
