= Illusion (ZE:A EP) =

EP by ZE:A
- Released: August 9, 2013
- Recorded: 2013
- Genres: K-pop, dance-pop
- Length: 21:32
- Language: Korean
- Label: Star Empire Entertainment

ZE:A chronology
Phoenix (2012)	Illusion (2013)	First Homme (2014)

Singles from Illusion
- 1. "The Ghost Of Wind" Released: August 9, 2013

Illusion is the first Korean EP released by K-POP group ZE:A. The album was released on August 9, 2013.

== Background ==
On August 5, 2013 Star Empire Entertainment released an audio teaser for Illusion's title track The Ghost Of Wind. Later, on August 9, a video teaser of the music video was released. The song Step By Step was released as a pre-release single.

The comeback with the EP Illusion marked the return of ZE:A's leader, Moon Junyoung, after being away from promotional activities due to a leg injury.

== Promotion ==
Illusion promotions began on August 8, 2013 with a showcase and mini-fanmeet. The following day televised music show promotions started with a performance on KBS' Music Bank.

The title track off Illusion, The Ghost Of Wind, peaked at number 21 on the Gaon Charts and is the highest position any ZE:A has reached since their debut single, Mazeltov. The album itself peaked at number six on the Gaon charts, selling roughly 41,221 albums before it fell from the top 100.

A Japanese single version of Illusion was released on November 28, 2013. Both a Japanese and Korean music video of Step By Step were released on November 1, 2013 to promote its release.

== Track listing ==
Number	Title	Lyrics	Composer	Arranger	Length
1	Crazy	이현도	이현도; Eniac	이현도; Eniac	3:40
2	The Ghost Of Wind 바람의 유령	Duble Sidekick; David Kim	Duble Sidekick	Duble Sidekick	3:22
3	Step By Step	Kevin Kim e.one Urban Cllasik	Kevin Kim e.one	e.one	3:08
4	U're My Sweety	이경봉; Urban Cllasik	이경봉; Urban Cllasik	이경봉; Urban Cllasik	3:24
5	No.1	한준	이유진	이유진	3:25
6	The Ghost Of Wind (Instrumental)	-	Duble Sidekick	Duble Sidekick	3:08
					Total Length: 21:32

=== Japanese single track listing ===
Number	Title	Lyrics	Composer	Arranger	Length
1	Step By Step (Japanese Version)	Kevin Kim e.one Urban Cllasik	Kevin Kim e.one	e.one	3:10
2	U're My Sweety (Japanese Version)	이경봉; Urban Cllasik	이경봉; Urban Cllasik	이경봉; Urban Cllasik	3:54
3	Step By Step (Original Version)	Kevin Kim e.one Urban Cllasik	Kevin Kim e.one	e.one	3:10
					Total Length: 10:14
