= Spectacular (album) =

Studio album by ZE:A
- Released: July 4, 2012
- Recorded: 2012
- Genres: K-pop, dance-pop
- Length: 43:44
- Language: Korean
- Label: Star Empire Entertainment

ZE:A chronology
Exciting (2011)	Spectacular (2012)	Phoenix (2012)

Singles from Spectacular
- 1. "Aftereffect" Released: July 4, 2012

Spectacular is the second Korean studio album of South Korean boy band, ZE:A. It was released on July 4, 2012 by Star Empire Entertainment.

== Background ==
Beginning on June 15, 2012 in Busan, ZE:A launched their 'Fighting Project' promotions to promote Spectacular. In these promotions, they held streetcar performances in various cities and met with locals to advertise their second Korean studio album. Concept picture teasers of group members were released on June 22, 2012. Later, the music video teaser for Aftereffect, the title track of Spectacular, was released on June 29, 2012.

ZE:A held a press conference and showcase to preview Spectacular for 1,000 fans. The album's release on July 4, 2012 was preceded by their televised music show promotions, starting with Mnet's M Countdown on July 5, 2012. Due to injuries sustained on an outdoor variety show on May 28, 2012, ZE:A's leader Moon Junyoung was unable to participate in promotions for Spectacular's lead title track, "Aftereffect".

== Track listing ==
No.	Title	Lyrics	Music	Length
1.	"Love Is Gone"	Duble Sidekick	김희원; Duble Sidekick	3:49
2.	"후유증"	Brave Brothers; GALACTIKA * (ko)	Brave Brothers; GALACTIKA *	3:42
3.	"Hunter"	김유민; 장윤선; Urban Cllasik	Kei Lim (ko); Andrew Choi; Iconic	3:08
4.	"Coy Girl"	Nassun (ko)	e.one	2:57
5.	"Body To Body"	Duble Sidekick	Duble Sidekick	4:08
6.	"Never End"	브라이언 킴; Urban Cllasik	서재하; 이유진	3:40
7.	"Begin With Kiss"	브라이언 킴; Urban Cllasik	서재하	3:20
8.	"Daily Daily"	이지은; 한상원	한상원; 윤영민	3:40
9.	"별이 되어... (Someday...)"	Nassun; e.one; EJshow	e.one EJshow	4:31
10.	"Dirty Cat"	Nassun; e.one	e.one	3:36
11.	"S.A.D (Something In A Dream)"	Nassun; 드라마틱스	e.one	3:31
12.	"Aftereffect (Instrumental)"	Brave Brothers; GALACTIKA *	GALACTIKA *	3:42
Total length:				43:44

== See also ==
- ZE:A discography
