= Vampire Idol =

South Korean situation comedy

- Promotional poster
- Genre: Sitcom
- Written by: Ha Chul-song; Lee Sung-eun; Park Ji-hyun; Park Ran; Park Yeon-kyung; Choi Yoon-chul
- Directed by: Lee Geun-wook; Yoo Yong-hee; Baek Seung-joo
- Starring: Lee Jung; Kang Min-kyung; Shin Dong-yup; Kim Soo-mi; Lee Soo-hyuk; Kim Woo-bin; Hong Jong-hyun
- Country of origin: South Korea
- Original language: Korean
- No. of episodes: 79

Production
- Running time: Mondays to Saturday at 20:30 (KST)
- Production company: SidusHQ

Original release
- Network: Maeil Broadcasting Network
- Release: December 5, 2011 – March 30, 2012

Vampire Idol (Korean: 뱀파이어 아이돌) is a 2011 South Korean youth sitcom that ran on MBN from 2011 to 2012.

== Synopsis ==
A naïve vampire prince from Vampire planet visits Earth to see a live performance of his favorite idol contender. He remains stuck on Earth with his three trusted and loyal servants. He then decides to join the competition himself and struggles to become a global pop idol.

== Cast ==
=== Main characters ===
- Lee Jung as Prince (Wang-ja)

He gets everything perfect: appearance, character, talent, and attitude. But only when he is the prince of Vampire planet, on Earth he is considered the exact opposite and hated on for being "unattractive."

- Kang Min-kyung as Min-Kyung

19 years old. She works as a road manager in the talent agency. Later she becomes the vocalist in a girl group.

- Shin Dong-yup as Dong-yup

Manager of a talent agency. He's in charge of Vampire Voice. Everything he says is a lie and he's very good at it.

- Kim Soo-mi as Soo-mi
  - Song Soo-hyun as young Soo-mi

61 years old. She works for the talent agency and is in charge of providing meals in the boarding house for the members of Vampire Voice.

- Lee Soo-hyuk as Soo-hyuk/Mukadil Paejua

He is one of Prince's servants. He is the vocalist of Vampire Voice and also plays the guitar and drums. He has a serious personality and is very vampire-like, always craving blood.

- Kim Woo-bin as Woo-bin/Gabri Rates

He is one of Prince's servants. He has super-sharp hearing.

- Hong Jong-hyun as Jong-hyun/Yariru Genius

He is a genius with an IQ of 790. He is also very socially awkward.

=== Supporting characters ===
- Hwang Kwang-hee as Kwang-hee
- Bang Min-ah as Min-ah
- Chun Woo-hee as Woo-hee
- Kim Soo-yeon as Soo-yeon
- Lee Yu-bi as Yu-bi
- Oh Kwang-rok as Kwang-rok
- Kim Dong-soo as Dong-soo
- Kim Sook as Oh Sook/Jenny
- Don Spike as Teacher Don
- Oh Hee-joon as Kwang-hee's manager
- Lee Hae-in as Hae-in
- Kim Sung-hoon

=== Cameo appearances ===
- Kim Wan-sun as Do Woo-mi
- Jay Park as J
- Lee Eui-jung
- Jung Hee-chul as himself (ep.07)
- Moon Joon-young as himself (ep. 07)

== International broadcast ==
In Thailand aired on MCOT Family beginning July 18, 2015.

== See also ==
- Vampire film
- List of vampire television series
