= 3Peace Lovers =

Japanese musical group

- Origin: Tokyo, Japan
- Genre: J-pop
- Years active: 2012-2013
- Label: Happinet
- Past members: Yoshihide Sasaki; Hayato Nikaido; Ha Min-woo
- Website: www.3pl.tv

3Peace Lovers (stylized 3Peace☆Lovers) was a Japanese project group formed by Happinet in 2012. The group consists of 3 members: actor Yoshihide Sasaki, visual kei band member Hayato Nikaido, and ZE:A member Ha Min-woo. The group was put together as a crossover between J-pop, visual kei rock, and K-pop, which each member represents respectively.

== Members ==
- Yoshihide Sasaki
- Hayato Nikaido
- Ha Min-woo

== Discography ==
=== Studio albums ===
Title	Year	Details	Peak chart positions	Sales
Title	Year	Details	JPN	Sales
3Peace Lovers	2013	Released: June 25, 2013; Label: Happinet; Format: CD	85	—
"—" denotes releases that did not chart or were not released in that region.

=== Singles ===
Title	Year	Peak chart positions	Sales	Album
Title	Year	JPN	Sales	Album
"Virtual Love"	2012	25	—	3Peace Lovers
"Love Evolution"	2012	25	—	3Peace Lovers
"Illusion" / "My True Love"	2013	12	—	3Peace Lovers
"—" denotes releases that did not chart or were not released in that region.
