= First Homme =

2014 album by ZE:A

EP by ZE:A
- Released: June 2, 2014
- Recorded: 2014
- Genre: K-pop, dance-pop
- Length: 17:08
- Language: Korean
- Label: Star Empire Entertainment

ZE:A chronology
Illusion (2013)	First Homme (2014)

Singles from First Homme
- 1. "Breathe" Released: June 2, 2014

First Homme is the second Korean EP released by K-POP group ZE:A. The album was released on June 2, 2014.

== Background ==
On May 23, 2014 Star Empire Entertainment announced that ZE:A would have a comeback, after a ten-month hiatus, with their second EP. Following the announcement various teaser pictures were released.

== Track listing ==
Number	Title	Lyrics	Composer	Arranger	Length
1	First Homme	-	e.one	정호현	0:41
2	Wobble 삐끗 삐끗	Ha Minwoo e.one Urban Cllasik	e.one	정호현	3:22
3	Breathe 숨소리	Brave Brothers	Brave Brothers 별들의 전쟁	별들의 전쟁	3:08
4	St:Dagger 비틀비틀	Brave Brothers 별들의 전쟁	미쓰리; Brave Brothers 별들의 전쟁	미쓰리 별들의 전쟁	3:24
5	ONE	e.one Kevin Kim; Urban Cllasik	Park Hyungsik e.one	정호현	3:25
6	Breathe (instrumental)	-	Brave Brothers 별들의 전쟁	별들의 전쟁	3:08
Total Length: 17:08
