= Wanted (band) =

South Korean musical group

- Origin: South Korea
- Genres: K-Pop; R&B
- Years active: 2004–2012; 2019–2020
- Labels: YG Entertainment; WS Entertainment
- Members: Jeon Sang-hwan; Ha Dong-kyun; Kim Ja-suk
- Past members: Seo Jae-hyo

Wanted (Hangul: 원티드) is a South Korean boy band that debuted in 2004 with the album, Like the First. Following the death of member Seo Jae-hyo in a car accident in August 2004, the group went on hiatus for three years before releasing their second album, 7 Dayz & Wanted, in 2007, followed by their third album, Vintage, in 2012. In 2012, their song, "Like You," featuring IU, charted at #14 on Billboard's Kpop Hot 100 chart.

== Discography ==
=== Albums ===
Title	Album details	Peak chart positions	Sales
Title	Album details	KOR	Sales
Like the First	Released: June 4, 2004; Label: M-Boat (YG Entertainment); Format: CD, cassette	12	KOR: 40,773+
7 Dayz & Wanted	Released: July 5, 2007; Label: WS Entertainment, LOEN Entertainment; Format: CD, cassette	—	—N/a
Vintage	Released: January 20, 2012; Label: WS Entertainment, LOEN Entertainment; Format: CD, digital download	13	KOR: 1,623+

== Awards and nominations ==
=== Mnet Asian Music Awards ===
Year	Category	Work	Result
2004	Best New Group	"Reaction" (발작)	Nominated
