= Moon Joon-young =

South Korean actor

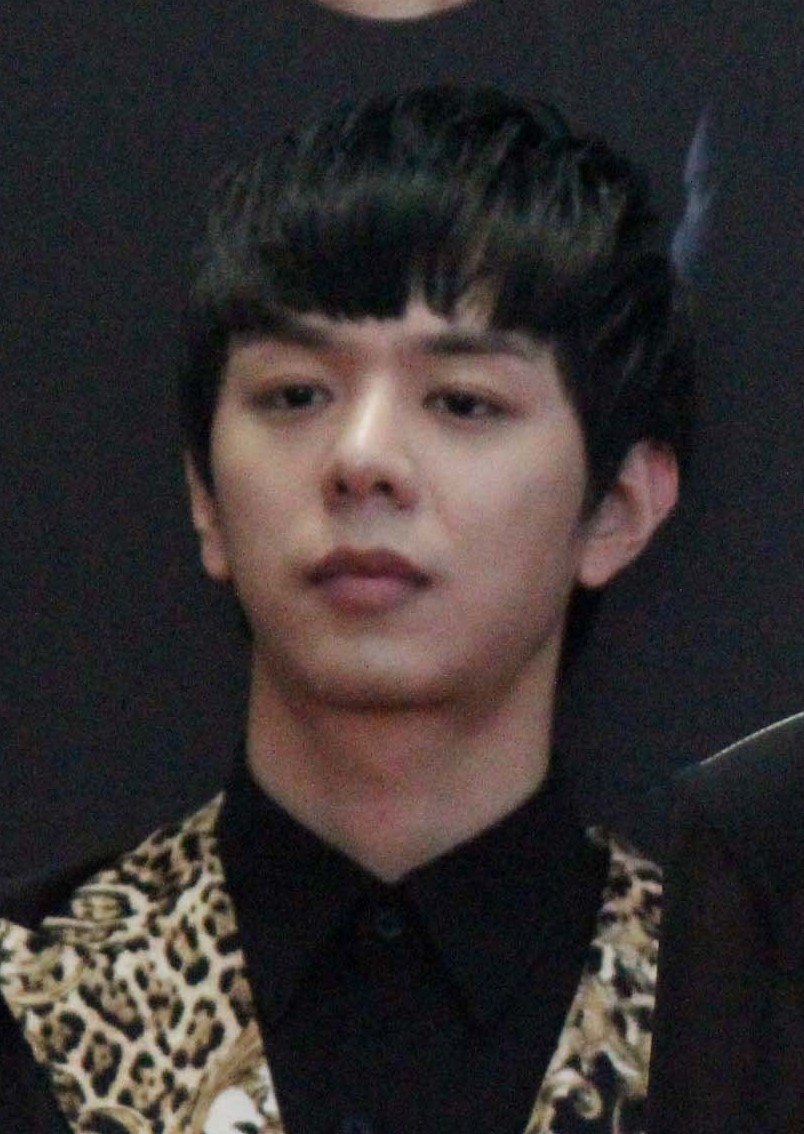
- Moon in 2013
- Born: Moon Joon-young; 9 February 1989 (age 37); Banghak-dong, Dobong District, Seoul, South Korea
- Other names: Moon Jun-young, Lee Hoo
- Education: Digital Seoul Culture Arts University (Department of Practical Music and Academic)
- Occupations: Actor; model; singer
- Years active: 2010–present
- Agent: EXA Entertainment
- Known for: Poseidon; Vampire Idol; The Clinic for Married Couples: Love and War

Moon Joon-young (born 9 February 1989), is a South Korean singer, actor, and model. He debuted as member of boy group ZE:A. He also appeared in dramas Poseidon, Vampire Idol and The Clinic for Married Couples: Love and War. He also appeared in films such as Ronin Pop and ZE:A Breathe.

== Biography and career ==
He was born in Seoul on February 9, 1989. He attended Digital Seoul Culture Arts University after he graduated. In 2010, he signed contract with Star Empire Entertainment. He debuted as member of boy group ZE:A in 2010. Apart from his group activities, he also made his debut as an actor and appeared in various television dramas Poseidon, Please Marry Me, Gloria, Vampire Idol, Poseidon, and The Clinic for Married Couples: Love and War. He also appeared in films Ronin Pop and ZE:A Breathe. In 2017, his contract with Star Entertainment expired. He signed with EXA Entertainment in 2017 to focus on his acting.

== Personal life ==
=== Military service ===
Moon fulfilled his mandatory military service as an active-duty soldier in the Republic of Korea Army from July 2020 until his discharge in January 2022.

== Filmography ==
=== Television series ===
Year	Title	Role	Ref.
2010	Prosecutor Princess	Minor in club	
2010	Please Marry Me	Trainee	
2010	Gloria	Singer trainee	
2011	Poseidon	Cha Hyun-seung	
2011	Vampire Idol	Moon Jun-young	
2013	The Clinic for Married Couples: Love and War	Soo-ho	

=== Film ===
Year	Title	Role	Language	Ref.
2010	Ronin Pop	Jackie	Korean	
2014	ZE:A: Breathe	Lee Hoo	Korean	
