= Poseidon (TV series) =

2011 South Korean action television series

- Promotional poster
- Genre: Action, Romance
- Written by: Jo Kyu-won
- Directed by: Yoo Chul-yong; Oh Sang-won
- Starring: Choi Siwon; Lee Si-young; Lee Sung-jae
- Country of origin: South Korea
- Original language: Korean
- No. of episodes: 16

Production
- Production location: Korea
- Running time: Mondays and Tuesdays at 21:55 (KST)
- Production company: Annex Telecom

Original release
- Network: Korean Broadcasting System
- Release: 19 September – 8 November 2011

Poseidon (Korean: 포세이돈) is a 2011 South Korean action television series starring Choi Siwon, Lee Si-young, Lee Sung-jae, Han Jung-soo, Jung Woon-taek and Kil Yong-woo. It aired on KBS2 from September 19 to November 8, 2011, on Mondays and Tuesdays at 21:55 for 16 episodes.

The drama revolves around the duties of Korean Coast Guard officers on rescues, terrorism threats, and other special missions; and their obstacles in life and love. It takes its name from the Poseidon Team, a special forces unit of the Marines.

== Plot ==
A worldwide criminal syndicate known as Heugsahoe exists. Their boss is Choi Hee-gon.

In 2008, the leader of the Intelligence Investigation Team of the Maritime Police, Kwon Jung-ryool (Lee Sung-jae), forms a secret investigation team to capture crime boss Choi Hee-gon. As Jung-ryool gets closer and closer to capturing Choi Hee-gon, Jung-ryool's wife Min-jung suddenly goes missing. Her dead body is then thrown in front of Jung-ryool. Soon after, other family members involved in the undercover operation are killed.

Sun-woo (Choi Siwon) goes undercover on Jung-ryool's orders. Sun-woo can't stop the mission, even though there's continuous threats on his life. Soon, a policewoman who investigates Sun-woo is killed. It's clear that the woman's murder was committed by crime boss Choi Hee-gon, but evidence is still lacking for his arrest. Finally, the undercover operation is abandoned.

3 years later, Jung-ryool appears obsessed with his job, trying to forget the guilt he feels over the death of his wife. With the help of Hyun Hye-jung (Jin Hee-kyung) and a director of the maritime police, Jung-ryool forms another special investigation team. To avoid the attention of others inside the maritime police and crime boss Choi Hee-gon, the special investigation team is disguised as the #9 investigation team which is responsible for unsolved cases.

Sun-woo has been demoted to the country maritime police office in Gunsan. There, Sun-woo busts an illegal trafficking organization and runs off with their smuggled goods. Sun-woo now becomes a fugitive. This was part of Jung-ryool and Sun-woo's plan to catch Choi Hee-gon. They hope to go through middle man Jung Deok-soo, nicknamed Popeye. Sun-woo approaches Popeye with his stolen goods, but Popeye finds out the truth. Luckily, Sun-woo is saved with the help of tactical team leader Kang Eun-chul (Yunho), his former colleague.

Sun-woo now joins the #9 investigation team. Sun-woo also takes an interest in Corporal Soo-yoon (Lee Si-young). Meanwhile, Popeye kidnaps Kang Eun-chul (Yunho). The abduction of Kang Eun-chul brings back memories of the slain police officer several years earlier.

== Cast ==
- Choi Si-won as Kim Sun-woo
- Lee Si-young as Lee Soo-yoon
- Lee Sung-jae as Kwon Jung-ryool
- Han Jung-soo as Oh Min-hyuk
- Jung Woon-taek as Lee Choong-shik
- Jang Dong-jik as Kang Joo-min
- Jung Yun-ho as Kang Eun-chul
  - Uhm Do-hyun as young Kang Eun-chul
- Jin Hee-kyung as Hyun Hye-jung
- Lee Byung-joon as Police superintendent Gu
- Son Jong-bum as Captain Oh
- Park Sung-kwang as Kim Dae-sung
- Lee Sang-hoon as Lee Won-tak
- Lee Joo-shil as Cha Myung-joo
- Kim Soo-hyun as Kwon Ha-na
- Jeon Mi-seon as Park Min-jung
- Park Won-sook as Uhm Hee-sook
- Kil Yong-woo as Oh Yong-gap
- Im Ki-hyuk as Kim Sang-soo
- Kim Tae-hyung as Woo Hyun-tae
- Kim Yoon-seo as Hong Ji-ah
- Kim Joon-bae as Jung Deok-soo ("Popeye")
- Jang Won-young as Ahn Dong-chool
- Lee Dong-shin as Kwon Chang-bum
- Choi Jung-woo as Han Sang-goon
- Lee Han-sol as Chang-gil
- Jung Ho-bin as Jung Do-young
- Jang Yong as Yoo Young-gook
- Choi Ran as Young-ran
- Kim Sun-kyung as Go Na-kyung
- Im Seung-dae as Kim Joo-hyung
- Moon Joon-young as Cha Hyun-seung
- Cha Ki-joo as Moo-young
- Kim Seung-pil as safety management employee
- Bae Jin-sub as Moon Seung-chan
- Hyun Chul-ho as Section chief Seo
- Jung Joo-ri

== Production ==
The drama was originally set for broadcast on SBS during the first half of 2011, starring Eric Mun and Kim Ok-vin in the roles of Kim Sun-woo and Lee Soo-yoon, respectively. However they dropped out when production was halted after the Bombardment of Yeonpyeong incident in November 2010. Production company Annex Telecom transferred to a different network KBS, and filming resumed in August 2011 with the casting of Choi Siwon and Lee Si-young.

== Ratings ==
| Date | Episode | Nationwide | Seoul |
|---|---|---|---|
| 2011-09-19 | 01 | 7.6% | 8.8% |
| 2011-09-20 | 02 | 6.6% | 8.7% |
| 2011-09-26 | 03 | 7.0% | 8.6% |
| 2011-09-27 | 04 | 6.2% | 8.3% |
| 2011-10-03 | 05 | 5.0% | 8.9% |
| 2011-10-04 | 06 | 6.4% | 8.6% |
| 2011-10-10 | 07 | 5.6% | 9.3% |
| 2011-10-11 | 08 | 9.2% (16th) | 9.6% (13th) |
| 2011-10-17 | 09 | 9.2% (17th) | 9.2% (18th) |
| 2011-10-18 | 10 | 8.3% | 8.9% |
| 2011-10-24 | 11 | 9.3% | 10.0% (19th) |
| 2011-10-25 | 12 | 9.2% (19th) | 8.8% (18th) |
| 2011-10-31 | 13 | 8.4% | 9.1% |
| 2011-11-01 | 14 | 9.4% (18th) | 9.2% (15th) |
| 2011-11-07 | 15 | 8.4% | 8.9% |
| 2011-11-08 | 16 | 10.3% (15th) | 11.5% (9th) |
| Average | | 7.9% | - |

Source: TNmS Media Korea

== International broadcast ==
The series was sold to seven countries in Asia, including Japan, China and Taiwan.

It aired on Mnet Japan beginning December 14, 2011.
