= Lovability (album) =

Studio album by ZE:A
- Released: March 17, 2011
- Recorded: 2011
- Genre: K-pop, dance-pop
- Length: 40:13
- Language: Korean
- Label: Star Empire Entertainment

ZE:A chronology
Leap For Detonation (2010)	Lovability (2011)	Exciting (2011)

Singles from Lovability
- 1. "Here I Am" Released: March 17, 2011

Lovability is the first Korean studio album released by Korean pop boy band, ZE:A. It was released on March 17, 2011.

== Background ==
ZE:A held a showcase to promote the release of the album. Televised music promotions followed shortly after that and lasted for roughly a month.

ZE:A's leader, Moon Junyoung, was absent from some of the promotional activities due to an orbital fracture that he sustained.

Promotions for their song Be My Girl were halted as the song was banned for presumably being "unfit for minors and will no longer be sold to those under the age of 19" as stated by the Ministry of Gender Equality and Family. The lyric line that induced the ban was the line "Be my girl tonight." within the song was ruled to suggest sexual content.

== Track list ==
Number	Title	Lyrics	Composer	Arranger	Length
1	Intro	Kevin Kim	Youjin Lee	Youjin Lee	1:07
2	Here I Am	Hayeon Kim; Outsidaz; Sherry Yi; Chris Golightly	Outsidaz; Francia Prisci	-	3:41
3	Again..	Hohyeon; Y-morris	Hohyeon; Y-morris	Hohyeon; Y-morris	3:08
4	Mazeltov	한상원	한상원	한상원	3:31
5	All Day Long 하루종일	Brave Brothers 코끼리왕국	Brave Brothers	Brave Brothers	3:34
6	Be My Girl	ZE:A; Outsidaz; Chris Golightly	Outsidaz	-	3:51
7	Love Coach	이경남	Roz	이경남	3:33
8	Level Up	정병기	박근태	Chul-won Lee	3:28
9	New Star	레드락; A-DUST	레드락; A-DUST	레드락; A-DUST	3:24
10	Man 2 Man	김이나	최현준	최현준 신사동호랭이	3:36
11	Special Day (for ZE:A'S)	김은수 박근철	Blue Apple Global	박근철	3:39
12	Here I Am (Instrumental)	-	Outsidaz; Francia Prisci	-	3:41
					Total Length: 40:13
