= Yoshihide Sasaki =

Japanese actor and singer

- 佐々木 喜英
- Born: October 4, 1987 (age 39); Tokyo, Japan
- Education: Toho Gakuen College of Drama and Music
- Occupations: Actor; singer
- Years active: 2003–present
- Agents: Toyota Office; Sense-Up (2011-2019)
- Musical career
- Genre: J-pop
- Label: Happinet

YouTube information
- Channel: Yoshihide Sasaki
- Years active: 2019–present
- Genre: Cover
- Subscribers: 51.3 thousand
- Views: 97.5 thousand
- Last updated: June 30, 2020

Yoshihide Sasaki (佐々木 喜英, Sasaki Yoshihide; born October 4, 1987 in Tokyo) is a Japanese actor and singer. He made his first acting appearance in 2003 and has since been involved in many productions, mostly in theater. He is best known for his role as Kuranosuke Shiraishi in Musical: The Prince of Tennis.

In addition to acting, Sasaki debuted as a singer in 2010 with the extended play Spark. From 2012 to 2013, he was part of the project boy band 3Peace Lovers.

== Career ==
Sasaki began his stage career in 2003, appearing in the stage production of Hidamari no Ki. Between 2003 and 2007, he appeared in many stage plays, musicals, commercials, and movies. He became widely known, mainly through his work as Shiraishi Kuranosoke in The Prince of Tennis musical series in 2008. His popularity increased following this work. In 2009, he frequently appeared in [Tenimyu[, and was also featured in multiple magazines and released a photo-book and idol DVD. In 2010, his appearance as Shiraishi Kuranosuke came to an end with Dream Live 7th.

In 2010, he did a recitation of the stage play Watashi no Atama no Naka no Keshigomu 2nd letter (The eraser in my mind). He also appeared in the movie Kimi e no Melody (Melody for you), co-starring Hisanori Sato, who was a member of Tenimyu's Shitenhouji's cast as well. He released his first mini-album, titled Spark, in November 2010 after announcing his artist debut during the Summer Live tour with Yūta Furukawa (Sasaki and Furukawa also met during Tenimyu). At the end of 2010, Sasaki continued his stage career, appearing in Pride. In 2011, he appeared in multiple stage performances as well as in three movies: Gakudori, Gangster, and Ishi no Furu Oka (The Hill of the Falling Stones), in the latter co-starring as the lead with Yūta Furukawa. A few months later, a pair of DVDs were released featuring Sasaki and Furukawa, covering their journey in Australia. Sasaki also started appearing in the TV series Shinwa Senshi Gigazeus, had multiple live performances, released two maxi-singles, and became the MC of the Nico Nico Live Broadcast titled mmmm☆Ecstasy.

In 2012, he continued his stage career, appearing in Douke no Hitomi, Tumbling vol.3, SA☆BI☆TA～ame ni hakonda ai～, another run of Watashi no Atama no Naka no Keshigomu, and the fifth anniversary of the One-Heart Music Festival to celebrate the fifth anniversary of Theatre Clear. He also made appearances in the TV series Fallen Angel and Aozora no Tamago (A budding blue sky). Nico live broadcast titled mmmm☆Ecstasy finished. In March, he released his second mini-album NeΦ Vocalism. Around the same time, it was announced that he would form a new group called 3Peace☆Lovers with Hayato Nikaido and ZE:A's Ha Min Woo.

=== 2017-present: Freelance ===
In October 2017, Sasaki sustained a knee injury during a showing of K: The Stage and later got surgery in 2018. In March 2019, Sasaki left his agency to go freelance. He was cast as Goro Akechi for Persona 5: The Stage, his first role in two years that featured him singing.

== Discography ==
=== Compilation albums ===
Title	Year	Details	Peak chart positions	Sales
Title	Year	Details	JPN	Sales
Yoshihide Sasaki Best Album: Hide Out	2016	Released: March 2, 2016; Label: Exit Tunes; Format: CD; Track listing: 1. "Toxic Night"; 2. "Venus"; 3. "Yubisaki to Kuchibiru" (ゆびさきとくちびる); 4. "Go Ahead"; 5. "Shine"; 6. "Verticordia (Wakare no Uta)" (Verticordia ～別れの歌～); 7. "Butterfly"; 8. "Fantastic"; 9. "Who's Cryin'?"; 10. "Uwakiyo no Yume" (浮き世の夢)	57	—
Yoshihide Sasaki 10th Anniversary Album: Dimension	2021	Released: September 8, 2021; Label: Marvelous; Format: CD	57	—
"—" denotes releases that did not chart or were not released in that region.
Dimension 2	2025	Released: October 4, 2025; Label: EMP; Format: CD		

=== Extended plays ===
Title	Year	Details	Peak chart positions	Sales
Title	Year	Details	JPN	Sales
Spark	2010	Released: November 24, 2010; Label: Marvelous AQL; Format: CD; Track listing: 1. "Butterfly"; 2. "Go Ahead"; 3. "Fantastic"; 4. "Shine"; 5. "Wild Birds"; 6. "Premium Road"	59	—
Neo Vocalism	2012	Released: March 21, 2012; Label: Happinet; Format: CD; Track listing: 1. "Venus Road"; 2. "To Be Boys..."; 3. "Yubisaki to Kuchibiru" (ゆびさきとくちびる); 4. "Irokui" (色喰い); 5. "NeoRomantic LoveStory"; 6. "Dear My..."; 7. "Verticordia (Wakare no Uta)" (Verticordia ～別れの歌～)	103	—
"—" denotes releases that did not chart or were not released in that region.

== Filmography ==
=== Films ===
Year	Title	Role	Notes
2004	Horn Head Hero	–	Debut
2004	Midori no Hikari	Hiro	
2010	Kimi no Merodi E	Rin Sakuragi	
2011	Ishi no Furu Oka	Shūji Ishikawa	
2011	Gangster	Sakurazaka	
2011	Gakudori	Susumu Imai	
2012	Bakumatsu Kitan Shinsen 5	Tsuchimikado Motoharu	
2013	Bakumatsu Kitan Shinsen 5 – Kengo Korin	Tsuchimikado Motoharu	
2014	Bright Audition	Kei Narumiya	Main role
2019	Touken Ranbu: The Movie	Sōza Samonji	

=== Television ===
Year	Title	Role	Notes
2011	Shinwa Senshi Giga Zeus	Hayato Ramon	
2012	Fallen Angel	Hikaru Kitahara	
2012	Aozora no Tamago	Takayuki Sato	
2013	Bussen	Sada Tatematsu	

=== Anime ===
Year	Title	Role	Notes
2009	Kotatsu Neko	Alexandrite	
2017	Sengoku Night Blood	Mitsunari Ishida	

=== Stage ===
- Hidamari no Ki (October 2003, Rikkokai Hall)
- OINARI (February 2004, Theater V Akasaka)
- Hotel California (March 2004, Akashi Studio)
- Ribon no Kishi~Washio Koukou Engekibu Funtouki~ (November 2004, Rikkokai Hall)
- Lost Seven (March 2005, Rikkokai Hall)
- Musical- Silver (October 2005, Rikkokai Hall)
- Oinari (February 2006, Rikkokai Hall)
- Ajidoko Honten 「THE☆Seishun」 (March 2006, Akashi Studio): Production and choreography
- Ie wo Deta (2006, Space Kiritomo)
- Zenkoku Koukou Engeki Contest Opening Act 「Natsuyume」 (2007)
- Touhou Gakuen Gejuutsu Tankidaigaku Engeki Senkou Sotsugyou Musical game (February 2008)
- Musical The Prince of Tennis – Role of Kuranosuke Shiraishi (B Cast)
  - The Treasure Match Shitenhouji feat. Hyoutei (February 6 – March 31, 2009)
  - Dream live 6th (May 2009)
  - The Final Match Rikaidai First feat. Shitenhouji (July – October 2009)
  - The Final Match Rikaidai Second feat. Rivals (December 2009 – March 2010)
- Dream live 7th (May 2010)
- Recitation 「Watashi no Atama no Naka no Keshigomi 2nd letter」 Saien (September 10, 11 and 16, 2010)
- Pride (12/2010, Clie Theater) – Role of Ikenohata Ranmaru
- CLUB SEVEN 7th stage (April 3–17, 2011)
- Recitation Watashi no Atama no Naka no Keshigomi 3rd letter (May 3, 2011) as Kousuke
- Sabishii no ha Omae dake Janai (June 17–26, 2011)
- Recitation Watashi no Atama no Naka no Keshigomi (March 2012)
- Douke no Hitomi (April 2012)
- Recitation Watashi no Atama no Naka no Keshigomi in Osaka (July 2012) as Kousuke
- Tumbling vol.3 (August 2012) as Tsukioka Yuuto
- SA☆BI☆TA～ame ni hakonda ai～ (October 2012) as Dong Hyun
- Theatre Clear fifth Anniversary ONE-HEART MUSICAL FESTIVAL (December 2012)
- Ultra Musical Bakumatsu Rock as Okita Souji
- Kuroshitsuji The Musical [Lycoris that blazes the earth] (September 5 – October 5, 2014) as Viscount of Druitt
- Club Seven 10th stage! (April 2–27, 2015)
- Musical Hakuouki Reimeiroku as Hijikata Toshizou (May 18 – June 14, 2015)
- Kuroshitsuji The Musical [Lycoris that blazes the earth] 2015 (November 7 – December 6, 2015) as Viscount of Druitt
- Kuroshitsuji The Musical [Lycoris that blazes the earth] 2015 China performances (December 11–27, 2015) as Viscount of Druitt
- Goku (February 16–28, 2016) as Kougaiji
- Stageplay Touken Ranbu: Kyoden Moyuru Honnouji (May 3–20, 2016) as Souza Samonji
- Ultra Musical Bakumatsu Rock: Kurofune Raikou (August 20 – September 9, 2016)
- Stageplay Touken Ranbu: Kyoden Moyuru Honnouji [Reprise] (December 15, 2016 – January 17, 2017) as Souza Samonji
- Musical Hakuoki: Harada Sanosuke-hen (April 14–30) as Kazama Chikage
- Stageplay Tokyou Ghoul 2nd stage (June 29 – July 9, 2017) as Tsukiyama Shuu
- Stageplay B-project on stage [Over The Wave] (July 28 – August 6, 2017 and August 16–17, 2017) as Kitakado Tomohisa
- Stageplay K: Missing Kings (October 19–29, 2017) as Mishakuji Yukari
- Ultra Musical Bakumatsu Rock Live (November–December 2017) as Okita Souji
- Musical Kuroshitsuji: Tango on the Campania (December 2017 – February 2018) as Viscount of Druitt
- Musical Onmyoji: Heian Emaki [Japan preview performance] (March 9–18, 2018) as Kuro Seimei
- Persona 5: The Stage as Goro Akechi
- Demon Slayer: Swordsmith Village Arc (April 11–20, 25–27, 2025) as Muzan Kibutsuji

=== DVD ===
- JOURNEY (released March 18, 2009)
- DO the movie (released 5/2010)
- Kimi E no Merodi Maikingu Shun no Kodou Beat of Sasaki Yoshihide (released 10/2010)
- Bokutachi no Chikyuu Road in Australia (released 05/2010)

=== Game ===
- Sengoku Night Blood (2017) – Ishida Mitsunari

=== Drama CD ===
- Fantastic Night (2021) – Carl
