= ZE:A =

South Korean boyband

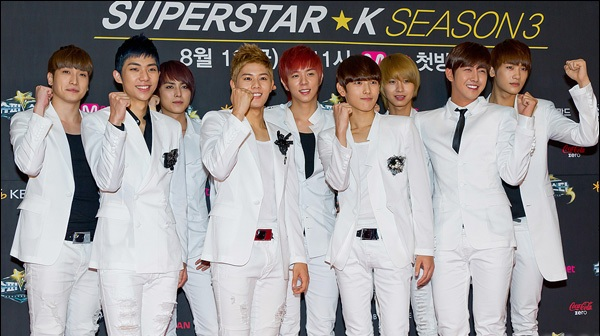

Background information
- Also known as: Children of Empire
- Origin: Seoul, South Korea
- Genres: K-pop; dance
- Years active: 2010–2017 (Note: Indefinite hiatus)
- Labels: Star Empire; Universal D; Warner Music China; Sony Music
- Spinoffs: ZE:A FIVE; ZE:A4U; ZE:A J; 3Peace Lovers
- Members: Kevin; Hwang Kwang-hee; Yim Si-wan; Moon Joon-young; Kim Tae-heon; Jung Hee-chul; Ha Min-woo; Park Hyung-sik; Kim Dong-jun

ZE:A (Hangul: 제국의 아이들), also known as Children of Empire, is a South Korean boy band formed by Star Empire Entertainment in 2010. The group is composed of nine members: Kevin, Hwang Kwang-hee, Yim Si-wan, Moon Joon-young, Kim Tae-heon, Jung Hee-chul, Ha Min-woo, Kim Dong-jun and Park Hyung-sik. The group released their debut single album Nativity with lead single "Mazeltov" on January 7, 2010, alongside their showcase performance five days later. The group debuted on KBS' Music Bank on January 15, 2010.

== History ==
=== Pre-debut ===
Under the name Child of Empire, following their appearance on Mnet's Office Reality, the group gained attention by performing various guerilla shows and creating UCC (user created content) videos. They have also appeared in a documentary-styled show Star Empire, and later getting their own documentary show titled Empire Kids Returns, showing them performing in wingcar performances around Seoul and training. The group faced controversy in December following the similarities of the group's name to Brown Eyed Girls' JeA. The group later changed the pronunciation of the name to avoid confusion.

=== 2010: Debut, Nativity, Leap for Detonation, Level Up, concert tour and Japanese debut ===
ZE:A released their debut single album Nativity on January 7, 2010, having it reached number one on both the "Album Chart" and "Artist Chart" on Daum that same day.

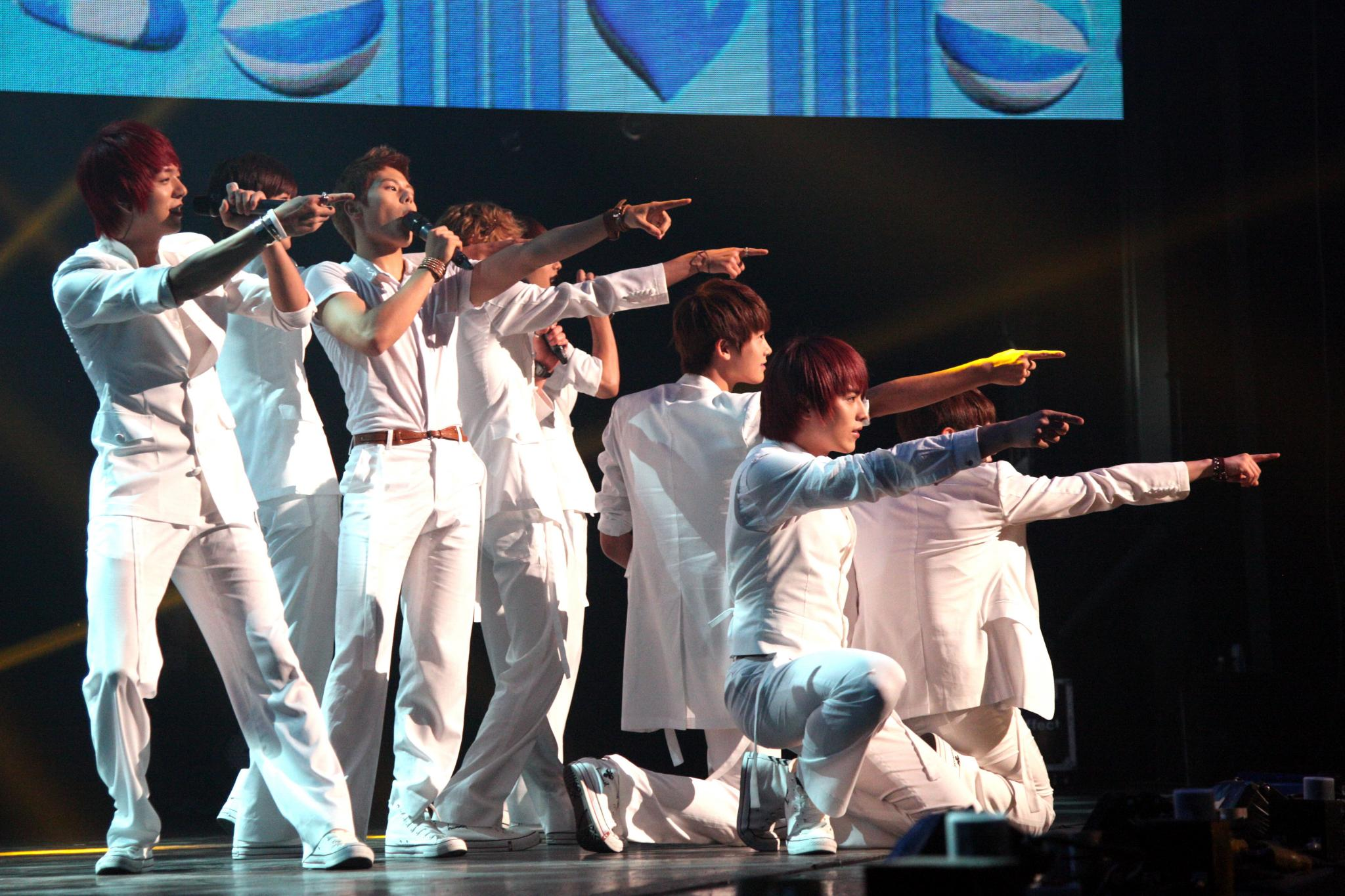
ZE:A performing at the Cyworld Dream Music Festival, July 23, 2011

They subsequently released their second single album Leap for Detonation on March 25, 2010. The title track, "All Day Long" was produced by Brave Brothers. The group released both a music video and a short music drama for the song, featuring member Kim Dong Jun as the lead actor, as well as labelmate Park Min Ha from Nine Muses. The group's third single Level Up was digitally released on July 8, 2010. In June, their official fanclub name was announced to be ZE:A's (or ZE:A STYLE).

At the end of July, the group embarked on their Asia promotion tour, stopping by Thailand, Taiwan, Singapore, Malaysia and various other places.

On September 22, 2010, they debuted in Japan by releasing their Japanese debut single ZE:A!(ゼア!). The single placed third on the Oricon daily chart. On December 21, 2010, ZE:A released their Japanese single album, Love Letter/My Only Wish. It placed second on Oricon daily chart.

=== 2011: Lovability, Exciting!, Watch Out and Heart For 2 ===
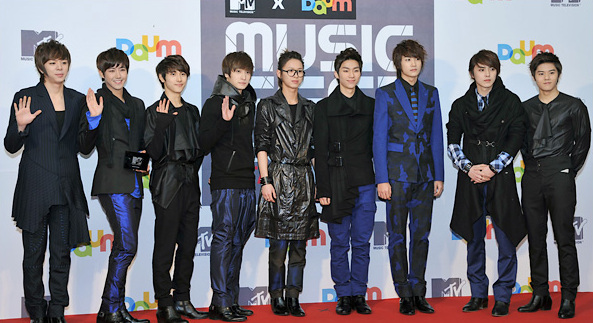
ZE:A in February 2011

It was announced on January 16, 2011 by Japan's Sankei Sports that the group will have leading roles for the Japanese-Korean collaboration movie RONIN POP.

The group released their first full-length album, Lovability, on March 17, 2011 with "Here I Am" set as the lead single.

Promotions for Lovability were cut short due to "Be My Girl", a song off Loveability, was deemed unsuitable for minors. On March 16, a representative from Star Empire announced that the group will be donating a portion of their tour profits from the first half of 2011 to aid in the relief of the Japanese earthquake and tsunami.

At the end of June, Star Empire announced that the group will be releasing a summer single. While filming the jacket album for Exciting!, member Hyung Sik fell off the yacht with member Dong Jun. Hyung Sik was saved by Dong Jun and the group's manager, while suffering a minor ankle injury.

On July 8, 2011, ZE:A's third single album Exciting! with lead single "Watch Out" was released and the group made their comeback on KBS's Music Bank the same day. On July 8, for the first time, the group took the number one spot on Hanteo's real-time album sales chart. On July 29, another single "Heart For 2" was released. After two weeks of promoting "Watch Out!", the group started their follow-up promotion with "Heart For 2".

Early October, Star Empire announced that a new Japanese single will be released on November 22. The single contained 4 tracks, including a ballad song titled Daily Daily, a Japanese version of "All Day Long" and instrumental versions of both songs. The single was placed 3rd on the Oricon Chart just a few hours after release.

=== 2012: Delayed comeback, project unit debut, Spectacular, Phoenix and Beautiful Lady ===
During the brief break, various ZE:A members ventured into drama appearances and variety appearances. Notably, Yim Siwan received national fame for his role in the MBC fictional historical drama The Moon That Embraces The Sun playing the teen version of the prince's scholar, Heo Yeom. The drama was broadcast from January 4 to March 15, 2012.

ZE:A's comeback album was set to release on June 21, 2012, but in May, ZE:A's agency, Star Empire Entertainment, announced that the group would postpone their comeback because of an injury to member Jun Young's right ankle.

It was then later announced that ZE:A's Ha Min Woo would be forming a unit group with two Japanese artists, Hayato Nikaido (singer of Alpha), and actor Yoshihide Sasaki. The group is called 3Peace Lovers and their first single "Virtual Love" was released on June 26, 2012.

The group's second studio album, Spectacular, along with its title track "Aftermath" was released on July 4. The album contained 11 tracks. They had a showcase to promote the album, performing various songs.

In August, Kwanghee was confirmed to be the new cast of MBC We Got Married and will be Coupled with Sunhwa SECRET.

On August 26, ZE:A's fourth single album Phoenix was released. Promoted as a special gift for ZE:A'S, Beautiful Lady was released on December 7, 2012. The MV was released the same day with various scenes featuring ZE:A's Park Hyungsik and 4Minute's Nam Ji-Hyun who were cast in the reality show The Romantic and Idol.

=== 2013: Illusion ===
ZE:A's first mini album Illusion with lead single "Ghost of Wind" was released on August 8.

Hyungsik was cast in The Heirs as Jo Myungsoo. Minwoo was cast in a Japanese Musical Summer Snow.

ZE:A having their full scale first concert in Korea - Illusionist on 23 November.

=== 2014: First Homme, Junyoung's stage name adoption, Project Sub-Unit ===
The group's second mini album First Homme with title track "Breathe", was released on June 2, 2014. The group made their comeback stage for promotion First Homme started on June 5 on M! Countdown. "Breathe" was simultaneously promoted for two weeks with another song off their mini album "St:Dagger". Both tracks were produced by Brave Brothers.

On August 22, 2014, ZE:A leader Junyoung announced during their ZE:A's Day fanmeet that he would officially begin promoting under ZE:A under the stage name Lee Hoo (이후). He cited negative feelings surrounding his name as a reason to change his name. He would be the second member to adopt a stage name.

On August 22, Star Empire Entertainment announced that a ZE:A and Nine Muses collaborative subgroup would be formed, titled Nasty Nasty. The group consisted of Nine Muses members Kyungri and Sojin, and ZE:A member Kevin. They debuted on September 3, 2014 with their title track Knock.

=== 2015–17: ZE:A Best Album and hiatus ===
Minwoo announced his enlistment on August 26, 2015 and fully enlisted on September 15. He was slated to be on active duty for 21 months. Taeheon enlisted on December 7, 2015 as an active-duty soldier.

The group's first compilation album(best album), along with its title track "Continue", was released on September 18, 2015.

On April 18, Kwanghee was officially chosen to join the cast of Infinite Challenge, one of the most popular and successful Korean variety shows.

On February 9, 2017, it was falsely stated that ZE:A were likely to disband. However, it was later confirmed by the members themselves that this was not the case, and that for the time being they would focus on solo activities with some of the members joining different companies. On April 12, Star Empire gave an official statement confirming that ZE:A is not disbanding and will come back as a group again when the time comes.

== Members ==
- Kevin (케빈)
- Hwang Kwang-hee (황광희)
- Yim Si-wan (임시완)
- Lee Hoo (이후)
- Kim Tae-heon (김태헌)
- Jung Hee-chul (정희철)
- Ha Min-woo (하민우)
- Park Hyung-sik (박형식)
- Kim Dong-jun (김동준)

== Subgroups ==
- ZE:A FIVE (Siwan, Hyungsik, Kevin, Minwoo & Dongjun)
- ZE:A 4U (Kwanghee, Lee Hoo, Taeheon & Heechul)
- ZE:A J (Kevin, Taeheon, Heechul, Minwoo & Dongjun)

== Discography ==
- Lovability (2011)
- Spectacular (2012)

== Awards ==
=== Mnet Asian Music Awards ===
| Year | Nominated work | Award | Result |
|---|---|---|---|
| 2010 | "MAMA" | Best New Male Artist | Nominated |

=== State honors ===
Name of country, year given, and name of honor
| Country | Year | Honor | Ref. |
|---|---|---|---|
| South Korea (Note: Honors are given at the Korean Popular Culture and Arts Awards, arranged by the Korea Creative Content Agency and hosted by the Ministry of Culture, Sports and Tourism. They are awarded to those who have contributed to the arts and South Korea's pop culture.) | 2011 | Minister of Culture, Sports and Tourism Commendation | |
