= Jessica Jung discography =

Jessica discography
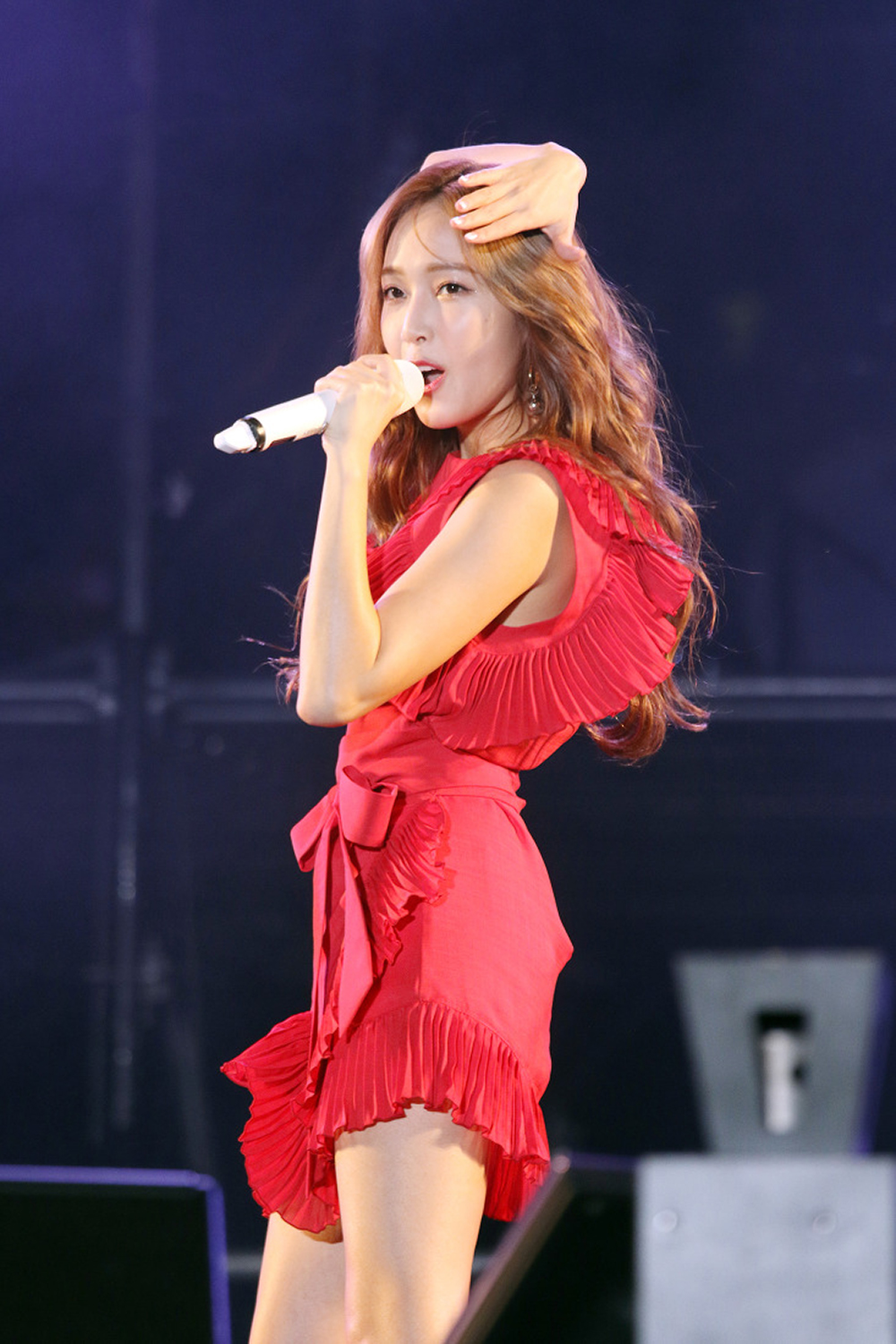
- Jung in 2016
- EPs: 4
- Singles: 6
- Music videos: 5
- Promotional singles: 7

Jessica Jung is an American and South Korean singer, songwriter, actress, author, and businesswoman. Her discography consists of four extended plays and five singles. Her debut extended play, With Love, J peaked atop the Gaon Album Chart and spawned the top-ten single "Fly" featuring Fabolous. The follow-up EP Wonderland also charted atop the chart. To celebrate her 10th anniversary as a singer, she released her third EP My Decade, in 2023 she released her fourth EP Beep Beep her first solo EP in six years.

== Extended plays ==
List of extended plays, showing selected details, selected chart positions, and sales figures
Title	Details	Peak chart positions				Sales
Title	Details	KOR	JPN	US Heat.	US World	Sales
With Love, J	Released: May 17, 2016; Label: Coridel Entertainment; Formats: CD, digital download, streaming	1	34	16	4	KOR: 80,783; JPN: 3,916
Wonderland	Released: December 10, 2016; Label: Coridel Entertainment; Formats: CD, digital download, streaming	1	85	—	7	KOR: 39,774; JPN: 1,773
Wonderland - NHR Remix	Released: July 21, 2017; Label: The Orchard, Natural High Record; Formats: Digital download, streaming	—	—	—	—	—N/a
My Decade	Released: August 9, 2017; Label: Coridel Entertainment; Formats: CD, digital download, streaming	4	67	—	5	KOR: 44,778; JPN: 1,494
Beep Beep	Released: November 22, 2023; Label: Coridel Entertainment, Warner Music; Formats: CD, digital download, streaming	6	—	—	—	KOR: 50,222
"—" denotes a recording that did not chart or was not released in that territory

== Singles ==
=== As lead artist ===
==== Korean singles ====
List of Korean singles, showing year released, selected chart positions, sales figures, and name of the album
Title	Year	Peak chart positions		Sales	Album
Title	Year	KOR Circle	US World	Sales	Album
"Fly" (feat. Fabolous)	2016	4	9	KOR: 259,807	With Love, J
"Love Me The Same"	2016	— (Note: "Love Me The Same" did not enter the Gaon Digital Chart, but peaked at position 55 on component Download Chart.)	—	KOR: 23,390	With Love, J
"Wonderland"	2016	— (Note: "Wonderland" did not enter the Gaon Digital Chart, but peaked at position 98 on component Download Chart.)	23	KOR: 16,175	Wonderland
"Because It's Spring" (봄이라서 그래)	2017	—	—	—N/a	My Decade
"Summer Storm"	2017	— (Note: "Summer Storm" did not enter the Gaon Digital Chart, but peaked at position 87 on component BGM Chart.)	—	—N/a	My Decade
"One More Christmas"	2018	—	—	—N/a	Non-album singles
"Call Me Before You Sleep" (잠들기 전 전화해) (featuring Giriboy)	2019	— (Note: "Call Me Before You Sleep" did not enter the Gaon Digital Chart, but peaked at position 97 on component BGM Chart.)	—	—N/a	Non-album singles
"Beep Beep"	2023	— (Note: "Beep Beep" did not enter the Circle Digital Chart, but peaked at number 128 on the Download Chart.)	—	—N/a	Beep Beep
"—" denotes a recording that did not chart or was not released in that territory

==== Japanese singles ====
List of Japanese singles, showing year released, and name of the album
Title	Year	Album
"Call Me Before You Sleep" (featuring CrazyBoy)	2019	Non-album single

=== As featured artist ===
List of singles, showing year released, and name of the album
Title	Year	Album
"I Love You" (8Eight featuring Jessica Jung)	2008	I Love You
"Cold Noodle" (냉면) (Park Myung-soo featuring Jessica Jung)	2009	Infinite Challenge Olympic Highway Duet Song Festival

=== Promotional singles ===
List of singles, showing year released, selected chart positions, and name of the album
Title	Year	Peak chart positions		Album
Title	Year	KOR	KOR Hot	Album
"GMPer's Song" (with Tiffany)	2008	—	—	2008 GMP Song (Good Morning Pops)
"Picnic Song" (with Tiffany)	2008	—	—	2008 GMP Song (Good Morning Pops)
"Sweet Delight"	2010	48	—	Non-album single
"My Lifestyle" (with Dok2)	2012	34	30	PYL Younique Volume 1
"—" denotes a recording that did not chart or was not released in that territory

== Soundtrack appearances ==
List of soundtrack appearances, showing year released, selected chart positions, and name of the album
Title	Year	Peak chart positions		Album
Title	Year	KOR Gaon	KOR Hot	Album
"Because Tears Are Overflowing" (눈물이 넘쳐서)	2011	20	—	Romance Town
"How" (어쩜) (with Kim Jin-pyo)	2012	12	14	Wild Romance
"Butterfly" (with Krystal)	2012	22	17	To the Beautiful You
"Heart Road" (마음길)	2012	57	43	Dream of the Emperor
"The One like You" (그대라는 한 사람)	2013	37	21	Dating Agency: Cyrano
"Can't Sleep" (잠이오지않아)	2021	— (Note: "Can't Sleep" did not enter Gaon Digital Chart, but peaked at position 97 and 74 on component Download Chart and BGM Chart, respectively.)	—	Jessica & Krystal – US Road Trip OST Part 1
"Snapshot"	2021	—	—	Jessica & Krystal – US Road Trip OST Part 2
"Daydream"	2021	—	—	Jessica & Krystal – US Road Trip OST Part 3
"—" denotes a recording that did not chart or was not released in that territory

== Other charted songs ==
List of songs, showing year released, selected chart positions, sales figures, and name of the album
Title	Year	Peak chart positions	Sales	Album
Title	Year	KOR Gaon	Sales	Album
"Big Mini World"	2016	91	KOR: 31,167	With Love, J
"Falling Crazy in Love"	2016	96	KOR: 28,950	With Love, J
"Dear Diary"	2016	— (Note: "Dear Diary" did not enter the Gaon Digital Chart, but peaked position 57 on component Download Chart.)	KOR: 23,274	With Love, J
"Golden Sky"	2016	— (Note: "Golden Sky" did not enter the Gaon Digital Chart, but peaked position 68 on component Download Chart.)	KOR: 21,863	With Love, J
"—" denotes a recording that did not chart or was not released in that territory

== Other appearances ==
List of other appearances songs, showing year released, and name of the album
Title	Year	Album
"Touch the Sky" (with Taeyeon, Seohyun, Sunny, and Tiffany)	2007	Thirty Thousand Miles in Search of My Son OST
"Love Hate" (오빠나빠) (with Seohyun and Tiffany)	2008	RoomMate
"Mabinogi (It's Fantastic!)" (with Seohyun and Tiffany)	2008	Non-album single
"The Little Boat" (작은 배) (as Girls' Generation with Taeyeon, Seohyun, Sunny, and Tiffany)	2008	Hong Gildong OST
"One Year Later" (1년 後) (with Onew)	2009	Tell Me Your Wish (Genie)
"Motion" (as Girls' Generation with Taeyeon, Seohyun, Sunny, and Tiffany)	2009	Heading to the Ground OST
"Say Yes" (with Krystal featuring Kris)	2014	Make Your Move OST
"Cheap Creeper" (as Girls' Generation with Taeyeon, Tiffany, Seohyun, and Sunny)	2014	Make Your Move OST
"Love! Love! Aloha!" (with William Chan)	2016	I Love That Crazy Little Thing OST

== Music videos ==
List of music videos, showing year released, and name of the directors
Song title	Year	Director(s)	Ref.
"Fly"	2016	Lumpens Production	
"Love Me the Same"	2016	Lumpens Production	
"Fly" (English version)	2016	Lumpens Production	
"Wonderland"	2016	VM Project Architecture	
"Because It's Spring" (봄이라서 그래)	2017	geeeembo strtsphr	
"Summer Storm"	2017	Naive Production	
"One More Christmas"	2018	Mara Production	
"Can't Sleep" (잠이 오지 않아)	2021	Unknown	
"Beep Beep"	2023	asknownas	
"Get it? Got it? Good" (feat. Amber Liu)	2023	Jihoon Shin	
