= Fly (Jessica song) =

Single by Jessica featuring Fabolous

from the EP With Love, J
- Language: Korean; English
- Released: May 17, 2016
- Genre: Pop; dance; teen pop
- Length: 4:12
- Label: Coridel
- Songwriters: Jessica; Karriem Mack; Eric Fernandez; Tatiana Matthews; Fabolous
- Producers: Eric Fernandez; Karriem Mack

Jessica Jung singles chronology
"The One Like You" (2013)	"Fly" (2016)	"Love Me the Same" (2016)

Fabolous singles chronology
"Lituation" (2014)	"Fly" (2016)	"Flex" (2016)

Music video
- "Fly" on YouTube

"Fly" is the debut solo single by American and South Korean singer Jessica featuring Fabolous, taken from her debut extended play With Love, J. It was written by herself, and produced by Eric Fernandez, Karriem Mack. It was released digitally by Coridel Entertainment on May 17, 2016, in conjunction with the release of the extended play.

The single peaked number four on the South Korean Gaon Digital Chart and has since sold over 259,807 digital copies. "Fly" is Jessica's first and only song to chart on the Gaon Digital Chart to date. To promote the song and the EP, Jessica embarked on a series of concerts titled "Fan Meeting 2016 Asia Tour" on June 1; the tour took place in Thailand, Taiwan, Japan, and other Asian countries.

== Background and composition ==
On September 30, 2014, Jessica announced on her personal Weibo account that she was "forced out" of the group, which was later confirmed by the record label itself. Jessica's final song with Girls' Generation is "Divine", which was released as a part of the repackaged version of their first Japanese greatest hits album, The Best. On August 6, 2015, S.M. Entertainment released an official statement stating that Jessica had officially parted ways with the company.

In February 2016, Jessica announced that her first solo album would be released under her new agency, Coridel Entertainment. In April 2016, representatives announced that Jung would release her first album the following month in May. On April 30, Coridel Entertainment released the track list which included the title track "Fly" featuring American rapper Fabolous. Jung wrote and composed the song, Musically, "Fly" is a pop dance song driven by piano and some synth elements. The song was composed by Jessica Jung, Karriem Mack, Eric Fernandez, Tatiana Matthews, and Fabolous.

== Promotion ==
The music video for the debut single, "Fly," was released on May 17, 2016, amassing over 2 million views within 24 hours of its release. The single went on to sell more than 259,807 digital copies and 9,089,404 online streams in the first month of its release.

== Music video ==
The music video was filmed at Salvation Mountain, located in Southern California, and was directed by Lumpens.

In the video, Jessica is sitting in a bathtub, in the desert, fantasizing about travelling to a far-off place with snow and ice she sees on a postcard and snowglobe. Jessica receives packages with jackets and scarves, which are great for much colder areas, and also imagines having marshmallows by a campfire while watching the Aurora Borealis. A cheetah figurine ends up being a makeshift reindeer. As she tosses fake snow into the air, Jessica expresses frustration with these placeholder items. She fears leaving the comfort of her bed and house, but overcomes this and packs up her things. Despite a slight trip-up, she journeys towards accomplishing her dreams.

The remaining lyrics for "Fly" express the idea of chasing your dreams and not being held back by self-doubt. It is encouraging and extremely positive. There are undertones of adversity, but the main message is about enduring and believing in yourself to reach your dreams. American rapper Fabolous joins her by contributing his liberated rap at the end of the song.

== Chart ==
=== Weekly charts ===
Chart (2016)	Peak position
South Korea (Gaon Digital Chart)	4
U.S. World Digital Songs (Billboard)	9

== Sales ==
Region	Sales
South Korea	259,807

== Release history ==
Country	Date	Version	Format
Worldwide	May 17, 2016	Korean-language version	Digital download
South Korea	May 17, 2016	Korean-language version	Digital download
Worldwide	May 27, 2016	English-language version	Digital download
