= Ryu Tae-joon =

South Korean actor and singer (born 1971)

- Born: December 7, 1971 (age 54); South Korea
- Other name: Yoo Tae-joon
- Education: Chosun University - Microbiology (dropped out)
- Occupation: Actor
- Agent: Coridel Entertainment
- Spouse: Unknown (m. 2017)

Korean name
- Hangul: 류태준
- Hanja: 柳太準
- RR: Ryu Taejun
- MR: Ryu T'aejun

Ryu Tae-joon (Korean: 류태준; born December 7, 1971) is a South Korean actor and singer.

== Career ==
In April 2017, Ryu signed with new management agency Coridel Entertainment.

== Personal life ==
In March 2022, Ryu announced that he had been married to his non-celebrity wife for 5 years.

== Filmography ==
=== Television dramas ===
- Family Secret (tvN, 2014) - Min Joon-hyuk
- The Noblesse (jTBC, 2014) - Baek Ki-ha
- The Great Seer (SBS, 2012) - King Gongmin
- KBS TV Novel: "Dear My Sister" (KBS2, 2011–2012) - Kang Joon-mo
- KBS Drama Special: "400-year-old Dream" (KBS2, 2011) - Jo Hyun-min / Moo-hyun
- All About Marriage (KBS2, 2010) - Choi Hyun-wook
- Green Coach (SBS, 2009) - Yoon Hyung-mo
- Working Mom (SBS, 2008) - Ha Jung-won
- Snow in August (SBS, 2007) - Oh Jong-hyuk
- Blue Fish (SBS, 2007) - Park Dong-hyuk
- Crazy in Love (SBS, 2007) - Kang Jae-hoon
- Hwang Jini (KBS2, 2006) - Byuk Kye-soo
- Love Truly (MBC, 2006) - Kim Joo-yeob

=== Films ===
- The Age of Blood (2017) - King Yeongjo
- You're My Pet (2011) - Cha Woo-sung
- Girl Scout (2008) - Lee Jong-dae
- WHY, IF (2026) - Ji-man

=== Variety show appearances ===
- Ya Shim Man Man (July 9, 2007)
- Strong Heart (April 13 & 20, 2010; December 20 & 27, 2011)
- Lord of the Ring (August 20, 2012, pilot episode)
- King of Mask Singer (June 11, 2017, Contestant as "The Dream of The Seagull" on episode 115)

== Discography ==
Album information	Track listing
하얀 기억 속의 너: Ryu Tae Jun - 1st Album; Released: April 1998	Track listing: 1. 천년 인연; 2. 하얀 기억속의 너(1); 3. 심혼; 4. 사랑의 향기; 5. 겨울풍경; 6. 하얀 기억속의 너 7. 하늘이 울면; 8. 나의 길 9. 돈키호테; 10. 너에게

== Awards ==
- 2007 SBS Drama Awards - New Star Award
- 2026 Mexico Sinister Horror Film Festival - Best Actor Award
