= Shine (Jessica Jung novel) =

2020 young adult romance novel

- Author: Jessica Jung
- Language: English
- Genre: Young adult
- Publisher: Simon & Schuster
- Publication date: September 29, 2020
- Publication place: United States
- Media type: Print (hardback, paperback), e-book, audiobook
- Pages: 352
- ISBN: 978-1-5344-6251-9
- Followed by: Bright

Shine is a young adult romance novel by American and South Korean singer Jessica Jung, published by Simon & Schuster on September 29, 2020. Jung was inspired to write the book based on her experiences in the South Korean music industry.

A sequel, Bright, was published on May 10, 2022.

== Plot ==
17-year-old Rachel Kim is a trainee at DB Entertainment, a prominent K-pop company. The atmosphere at DB is extremely competitive due to the instructors' high standards and the knowledge that only a minority of trainees will ever get chosen to become DB performers. Rachel is bullied by other trainees for her Korean-American background and for living with her family rather than in the trainee dormitory. Chief among the bullies is Choo Mina, (Note: The book includes characters with names both in the American style (personal name first) and the Korean style (family name first). This summary uses personal names wherever possible.) a queen bee whom Rachel accidentally insulted with several etiquette violations when the latter first joined DB. Rachel also faces opposition from her Umma (Mom), who was initially supportive of K-pop training but now fears it is distracting Rachel from other career prospects.

After a chance encounter with DB boy-band singer Jason Lee, Rachel develops a crush on him. Rachel is drugged by Mina at a party and arrives late to a trainee evaluation the next morning. DB CEO Mr. Noh announces that the best female trainee will be chosen to release a duet song with Jason, but Rachel flubs the evaluation and vomits on Jason, who reacts with amusement. Mina is chosen for the duet.

Rachel meets with her mentor, DB staff member Chung Yujin. They concoct a plan to restore face by recording Rachel singing with Jason and then anonymously leaking it to the public. The two go to an underground café for celebrities, where Rachel meets DB superstar Kang Jina and sings live with Jason. The "leaked" video goes viral and Rachel begs Mr. Noh for a second chance; he declares that both she and Mina will sing with Jason.

Rachel goes on several secretive dates with Jason, despite DB forbidding performers from dating, and the two fall in love. When Umma is sent a video by Mina of Rachel drugged at the party, she upbraids Rachel and threatens to pull her from training. Rachel retorts that Umma has never supported her enough despite the huge pressures in her life. Umma tells Rachel that if she is not chosen to debut before the next company tour in a few months, she will not be allowed to stay in DB.

Kang Jina announces that she will not renew her contract with DB, and the press depicts her as a diva who had become spoiled by luxury. While on a date with Jason, Rachel runs into a drunken Jina, who reveals that she was actually fired for violating the no-dating rule and then subjected to a smear campaign that prevents her from joining another company. Shaken, Rachel breaks off her relationship with Jason.

The song recorded by Mina, Rachel and Jason is extremely popular and the three are sent on a promotional tour. Rachel and Mina bond during the tour, but when Mina falls and injures herself while wearing shoes borrowed from Rachel, she accuses the latter of sabotaging her and they return to enmity. Meanwhile, Rachel still loves Jason, and rekindles their romance.

After the tour, photographs of Rachel and Jason dating are leaked to the press, but so are photos of Mina and Jason dating. Rachel learns that the leak and both relationships were orchestrated by DB as a publicity stunt for Jason, who plans to start a solo career. Mina and Jason were aware of the setup, but the secret was kept from Rachel due to her poor acting skills. Jason is portrayed by the media as a heartbroken innocent caught between two loves, and his solo debut is a great success. Jason tells Rachel that he genuinely loves her, but she tearfully breaks up with him. Rachel almost leaves DB, but decides to stay after being encouraged by Umma, who reveals that she was a competitive athlete in her youth and struggled with disapproval from her own mother.

Rachel is chosen as the lead singer of DB's next girl-group. Mina, chosen as lead dancer, reveals that she has a video of Rachel and Jason kissing outside of the DB-arranged dates, and holds it over Rachel's head as blackmail. Rachel endures further bullying from Mina and others during group training, but manages to destroy Mina's phone in a glass of water right before their debut performance.

== Characters ==
=== Kim family ===
Rachel Kim: The protagonist. An idol trainee at DB Entertainment. 17 years old in the traditional East Asian age reckoning. Born in the U.S.A., but moved to Korea with her family at 11 after being accepted into DB training. Passionate, but somewhat socially inept. Eventually becomes part of the idol group Girls Forever.

Leah Kim: Rachel's 13-year-old sister. A lonely girl who unsuccessfully attempts to leverage Rachel's trainee status to make friends. Eventually becomes a DB trainee herself.

Umma: Rachel's mother. A stern woman strongly concerned with her children's futures.

Appa: Rachel's father. A kind and hardworking man who runs an unprofitable boxing gym.

=== Choo family ===
Choo Mina: Rachel's main bully and rival at DB. An arrogant and manipulative girl who secretly struggles with her family's high expectations. Eventually becomes part of Girls Forever.

Choo Minhee: Mina's father. A chaebol figure who uses his wealth to influence DB. Harsh and demanding.

=== Lee family ===
Jason Lee: Idol singer from the group Next Boyz. Caring and sociable, but struggles to understand the true nature of DB and the idol industry. Mixed-race; feels alienated in both Korean and Canadian society.

Jason's parents: An estranged couple. The father is a white Canadian, while the mother was an ethnic Korean who immigrated to Canada as a teenager. They often fought over the father's desire for his wife and son to assimilate into white culture. The mother died when Jason was twelve, after which her wealthy sisters paid the father to give them custody of Jason.

=== DB staff ===
Mr. Noh: CEO of DB Entertainment. Callous and calculating, but tries to appear fatherly and foster the idea of a "family" among DB employees.

Chung Yujin: Head trainer at DB. Recruited and mentors Rachel. Harsh, but helpful.

Kang Jina: Idol singer from the group Electric Flower. Gets expelled from and slandered by DB for dating, after which she does not appear in the novel again, her career apparently over.

Mr. Han, Mr. Lim, Ms. Shim: Other DB executives who take part in creating idol groups. Mr. Han is implied to have had a relationship with Mina.

=== DB trainees ===
Akari Masuda: Japanese dance specialist and Rachel's closest friend. The two regretfully drift apart under the stress of advanced training. Gets "traded to another K-pop label" while Rachel is away on tour.

Im Lizzie & Shin Eunji: Other bullies of Rachel and eventual members of Girls Forever.

Choi Sunhee, Lee Jiyoon, Ryu Sumin, Shim Ari, Yoon Youngeun: Other members of Girls Forever.

=== Other ===
Song Gyumin: Idol singer from the group Ten Stars. Secretly Kang Jina's boyfriend. When their companies learn of the relationship, he is not punished, but breaks up with Jina.

Cho Hyeri & Cho Juhyun: Rachel's twin friends at school.

Daeho: Another student at Rachel's school. Somewhat nerdy. In a love triangle with Juhyun and Hyeri.

== Reception ==
Shine was a New York Times Bestseller, debuting at #5 on the Young Adult Hardcover list. Writing for The Tempest, Hannah Rachel Abraham rated it 6.5/10. She criticized the book's writing quality, "sadly underdeveloped" characters and "largely predictable" plot, but commended its depiction of unsavory elements in the K-pop industry and called it "an entertaining read". Tiffany Jillian Go of Metro Style commented: "I began the novel with no expectations and I was glad to have left with my expectations slightly exceeded. Jung doesn’t have the perfect book down pat, but the story was riveting enough to hold on to until the very end." Kirkus Reviews called the book a "fast-paced, entertaining romp" and praised its use of Korean words and cultural references.
