= Bright (novel) =

2022 young adult romance novel

- Author: Jessica Jung
- Language: English
- Genre: Young adult
- Publisher: Simon & Schuster
- Publication date: May 10, 2022
- Publication place: United States
- Media type: Print (hardback, paperback), e-book, audiobook
- Pages: 400
- ISBN: 978-1-5344-6254-0
- Preceded by: Shine

Bright is a 2022 young adult romance novel by Korean-American singer Jessica Jung. A sequel to her previous work Shine, the book revolves around a K-pop singer who faces personal and career challenges while trying to start a fashion brand.

== Plot ==
Five years after the events of Shine, 22-year-old Rachel Kim is a celebrated Korean idol as part of the girl group Girls Forever, managed by the company DB Entertainment. She has gained the confidence and influence to stop her groupmates from bullying her, and built friendships with some of them. She still feuds with her rival Mina, a fellow member of Girls Forever, but has made peace with ex-boyfriend Jason Lee.

Rachel meets a friend of a friend, investment banker Alex Jeon, and is immediately attracted to him. However, DB forbids idols from dating and Rachel knows that she could be fired for breaking this rule. Despite this, Rachel exchanges regular text messages with Alex and grows closer to him.

A fashion designer invites Rachel to Paris Fashion Week after praising her outfits online. Rachel, who has loved fashion since childhood, contemplates starting a clothing company after receiving encouragement from several professionals. She meets American designer and ex-singer Carly Mattsson, who also encourages her but warns her to "make sure you can spot the difference between bickering and bitterness" with her groupmates. Rachel begins a romantic relationship with Alex.

Rachel learns that she was offered a photo shoot with Vogue, but that DB prevented her from hearing about it and told Vogue she declined, then offered another idol as a subject instead. This motivates her to go ahead with her fashion company. She obtains approval for the project from Mr. Noh, the CEO of DB, and begins designing clothes. The members of Girls Forever are torn between happiness for Rachel, envy at her increasing individual fame, and worry that it will distract her from K-pop duties. Rachel assures them that "Girls Forever is still my number-one priority."

Rachel uses Alex's advice to plan her fashion brand, which she names "RACHEL K.", and finds manufacturers and retailers. Her groupmates begin turning against her in small ways, such as stealing her possessions and scheduling extra rehearsals without telling her. Rachel suspects Mina is orchestrating it, but cannot prove anything. Paparazzi begin sniffing around Rachel's meetings with Alex; Mr. Noh wards them off while warning Rachel that even the hint of a scandal could hurt her career.

Tensions rise when Girls Forever member Eunji is exposed by the press as having a boyfriend; she is scolded by DB and loses a brand endorsement deal, but is not fired. Feeling paranoid, Rachel cuts back on contact with Alex. She struggles to balance her schedule between Girls Forever tasks, the fashion brand, other work and personal time. The RACHEL K. brand launches to great success. However, after Rachel oversleeps and misses a Girls Forever event, the other members label her selfish and neglectful.

Mina leads the rest of Girls Forever in demanding that Rachel either leave the group, or put the fashion brand on hold until their contracts with DB expire in four years. Rachel refuses both options, then reconciles with Alex, deciding that their relationship is too important to sacrifice for her career. The other group members meet with Mr. Noh and demand that he remove Rachel or they'll all quit. Mr. Noh acquiesces and orders Rachel to announce that she's fallen ill while he plans the PR strategy for her exit. She instead tells the public that she's been forced out of Girls Forever, causing DB to fire her and blacklist her from the entertainment industry.

Carly offers to do a partnership project between RACHEL K. and her own fashion brand, which Rachel accepts. She performs K-pop songs at the promotional event and is pleased to find that she still has many fans. Girls Forever continues to be a successful K-pop group, while Rachel starts working full-time in fashion and goes public about dating Alex.

== Reception ==
Kirkus Reviews called the book "a glitzy sequel filled with drama and self-discovery" and commented "those interested in relationship dynamics may be left wanting further nuance, but anyone tuning in for more about Rachel's trajectory will enjoy her twists, turns, and personal triumphs."
