= Playback (South Korean group) =

South Korean girl group

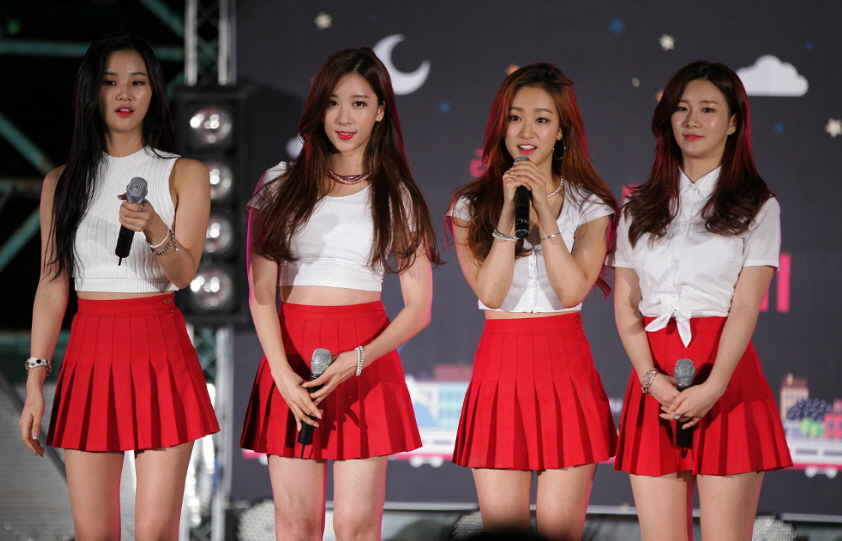
- Playback in 2015

Background information
- Origin: Seoul, South Korea
- Genres: K-pop; R&B
- Years active: 2015–2017
- Label: Coridel
- Members: Yunji; Eunjin
- Past members: Hayoung; Yujin; Woolim
- Website: coridelent.com/artist/playback/

Playback (Korean: 플레이백) is a South Korean girl group formed by Clear Company in 2015. They debuted on June 25, 2015, with the digital single "Playback". As of August 2021, Playback only has two members under the label: Yunji and Eunjin. According to the group's website however, Yunji, Yujin, Woolim and Eunjin are still members of the group.

== History ==
=== Pre-debut ===
Prior to joining Playback, Woolim spent three years as a trainee under JYP Entertainment. She later rose to fame after a video of her appearance on Mnet’s mystery singing show I Can See Your Voice, where she performed Ariana Grande’s “Problem,” went viral.

=== 2015–2017: Debut, new member and new agency ===
Playback released their eponymous debut single album Playback and its title track of the same name on June 25, 2015. Three months later, the group announced they planned to release a new single album on September 2. The album's title track, "I Wonder", featured singer and host Eric Nam. The song garnered attention from media due to the involvement of Norwegian production team ELEMENT, whose resume includes CeeLo Green, Musiq Soulchild, and Madcon.

Soon after their debut, their management label was merged with Coridel Entertainment in late-2015, and they were later officially managed by Coridel Entertainment.

Eunjin was added back to the group on April 13, 2017, after being cut from the group before their official debut.

On October 13, 2017 KST, Playback's agency Coridel Entertainment, released a statement through the group's official fan cafe to confirm that the members will be joining YG's survival show, Mix Nine. They said, "After a long period of inactivity and preparing for a comeback, the group was given an offer to appear on the show 'Mix Nine'. We decided to go on the show because we believe that it will be a good chance for each member to show their talents and abilities. The members of the group are preparing and working hard to show their best and are aiming to release an album mid-October so please stay tuned and continue to support the girls."

=== 2019–present: Hayoung, Yujin, and Woolim’s Departures ===
On November 5, 2019, FN Entertainment announced that Yujin had signed on with the agency as an actress under the name Oh Chae Yi.

On June 11, 2020, O& Entertainment announced that Hayoung had signed on with the agency after leaving Management Nangnam and will now be using the stage name Han Na Young.

On May 25, 2021, it was announced that Woolim signed with LeanBranding.

== Members ==
- Lee Yun-ji (이윤지)
- Lee Ha-young (이하영)
- So Yu-jin (소유진)
- Hwang Woo-lim (황우림)
- Ma Eun-jin (마은진)

== Discography ==
=== Single albums ===
Title	Album details	Peak chart positions	Sales
Title	Album details	KOR	Sales
I Wonder (플레이백)	Released: September 2, 2015; Label: Coridel Entertainment, CJ E&M; Formats: CD, digital download	36	KOR: 375

=== Singles ===
Title	Year	Peak chart positions		Album
Title	Year	KOR	US World	Album
"Playback" (플레이백)	2015	—	—	Non-album single
"I Wonder" (없을까?) (ft. Eric Nam)	2015	—	—	I Wonder
"Untold Story" (말하지 못한 이야기)	2017	—	—	Non-album singles
"Want You To Say" (말해줘)	2017	—	23	Non-album singles
"—" denotes releases that did not chart.

== Videography ==
=== Music videos ===
Year	Title	Director
2015	"Playback"	Kim Eun-yoo (12Rounds Production)
2015	"I Wonder" feat. Eric Nam	Kim Eun-yoo (12Rounds Production)
2017	"Want You To Say"	Kim Young-jo, Yoo Seung-woo (NAIVE Creative Production)

== Endorsements ==
Year	Product	Member	Note
2015	TG E600S Earphones	Woolim, Hayoung, Yujin, and Yunji	-

== Awards and nominations ==
=== Seoul Music Awards ===
Year	Nominee / work	Award	Result
2015	"Playback"	New Artist Award	Nominated
