= Jessica & Krystal =

- Logo
- Genre: Variety, Reality
- Presented by: OnStyle
- Starring: Jessica Jung; Krystal Jung
- Country of origin: South Korea
- Original languages: Korean; English
- No. of seasons: 1
- No. of episodes: 10

Production
- Producer: Kim Ji Wook
- Production locations: Seoul, South Korea; Daegu, South Korea; Los Angeles, U.S; Anaheim, U.S; New York, U.S; Tokyo, Japan
- Camera setup: Multi-camera
- Running time: approx. 50 minutes per episode

Original release
- Network: OnStyle
- Release: June 3 – August 5, 2014

Jessica & Krystal (Korean: 제시카 & 크리스탈) is a 2014 South Korean reality-variety show that aired on OnStyle starring Korean American sisters Jessica Jung, then member of Girls' Generation, and Krystal Jung of f(x).

== Background ==
Jessica & Krystal takes the viewers behind the scenes, to unveil Jung Soo Yeon and Jung Soo Jung's normal, everyday life as sisters and friends. The use of the pair's Korean names implies that the viewers will be seeing an up-close and personal side of the two sisters, instead of their stage appearance as Jessica & Krystal. CJ E&M OnStyle's CP Kim Ji Wook stated, "The one-of-a-kind Jung sisters' real lifestyle will be unveiled. We ask that you show a lot of interest and anticipation for the reveal of the lovely sisters' private stories."

== Episodes ==
Episode	Broadcast date	Summary
01	June 3, 2014	The sisters travel to Los Angeles, California for magazine photoshoots; Krystal also has a birthday surprise for Jessica. During the interview segment, the two sisters share their love of traveling and eating, they also address their "cold" image as well as getting emotional at the thought of separating from each other when either one gets married. Krystal expresses her fear of attention, her preference for darker-colored clothes, and shows the viewers her rookie driving skills. Jessica discusses her habit of sleeping and lying on the couch.
02	June 10, 2014	The two sisters have a discussion about the opposite gender and marriage. Tiffany and Hyoyeon are invited as guests and together with Jessica, as well as a mimicry of Jimmy Kimmel's Mean Tweets segment, the three members of Girls' Generation discuss about negative comments that they receive from the public. Shindong makes a surprise brief appearance as well. Jessica's poor athletic ability is back on show against Krystal in darts practice at the house.
03	June 17, 2014	Jessica, Tiffany and Hyoyeon continue their guest appearances. Subsequently, Jessica & Krystal travel to New York for another magazine photoshoots.
04	June 24, 2014	On the 2nd day of their stay in New York, Jessica & Krystal hang out with their respective friends before joining together for a picnic at Central Park. Jessica comments on the two sisters' shy nature, recalling her crying experience when she did her first camera testing. Jessica's friends remember Krystal as a crying kid who often hides behind her sister's back. The two sisters subsequently have a dinner date before heading back to South Korea. The episode ends with the two sisters cooking and eating at home, and showing their separate individual fan meetings – Jessica's in a mall in Seoul, and Krystal's in a store in Daegu.
05	July 1, 2014	Jessica spends some time alone at home, before going out to shopping and eating with her personal stylist, revealing their preferences in fashion, and Jessica also revealing her high navel, and the significance of her having short torso and longer legs relative to her short height compared to her tallest Girl's Generation bandmates: Sooyoung and Yuri. Meanwhile, Krystal and her f(x) bandmates film their new music video. Krystal also asked Luna and Amber on their experiences on being the younger sisters (Luna is the younger twin sister in her family by 97 seconds, but was noted to still had to treat her twin sister like an older sister.)
06	July 8, 2014	Krystal and her f(x) bandmates film their televised performance for "Red Light" on M Countdown. Victoria and Luna are invited to the house, as she would have spent a day alone at the JK house instead. The three f(x) members talk about their 7-year memories and life experiences as trainees and bandmates while watching pre-debut videos. Krystal also tried to ask Victoria to get married soon, as she is the oldest, but Victoria prefers single life too much to marry, and has lived in Korea for seven years straight without returning to China for leisure. Jessica travels to Tokyo, Japan for Girls' Generation's tour and hang out with her stylist, her Japanese friend and the friend's son, Leo, who looked a bit like Krystal when she was little, but Jessica sent champagne and desserts as presents to celebrate f(x)'s comeback.
07	July 15, 2014	After dinner and desserts, Krystal took Victoria and Luna to a bowling alley. However, given Luna never played before, Victoria got rusty after years of not training, and Krystal still not happy with not scoring a strike, and inability to convert easy spares, their poor performances prompted to ask for help from f(x)'s manager, which helped Krystal score her first strike, and improve spare conversion. Krystal also revealed her athletic prowess compared to Jessica. Few days later, Jessica and Krystal are reunited, and went to Namsan, Seoul and N Seoul Tower for a Friday night trip. Krystal is still scared of Jessica's driving due to her confident and decisive style. They also revealed their very different music tastes, just like their differing fashion preferences. Jesica's style is more mainstream Pop and R&B, which focuses on melody, but Krystal's preferences are more Indie, underground musician and from movie soundtracks, where the feel of the songs (mostly pensive ballads) are important. Jessica also showed concern for Krystal, because f(x) isn't a band known for many comebacks in a year, so during a hectic schedule, she finds it harder to adjust in promotional periods, as Krystal never managed to finish making blueberry tarts for fellow f(x) members due to exhaustion, and Jessica also failed as the tart crust were burnt, and any surviving tarts were dropped, so she packed a lunch for them, before moving back to her own house to prepare for more overseas schedules.
08	July 22, 2014	This is part 1 of the open house. From an online application after ep.6, 11 fans, which includes an underground band, and the show's actual narrator and former UFC's Korean-language commentator, and Kim Tae-hyung, MasterChef Korea Season 2 2nd place and Krystal fan, a pair of twins, an exchange student from Japan, and a girl that lost 8 kg after seeing Krystal's dress in ep. 1 and an internet blogger) are invited to be guests at JK House. Jessica and Krystal also makes canapés, as well as pre-brought lunches, in which most ingredients are pre-made. Kim Taehyung also gave Krystal his signature sweet potato tarts. Fans also reveals their gifts and talents to them. Kim Taehyung also gave a live cooking demonstration using ingredients from JK's fridge, in exchange for signatures on the apron he wore in the final.
09	July 29, 2014	In part 2 of the open house, Kim Taehyung finishes his impromptu dish with the narrator's help -Seafood salad with tortillas, and started a quiz, Taehyung also got the grand box full of games, souvenirs and makeups that they use. In part 2 of the show, JK became new models for a fashion accessory brand, so they film commercials and posters in Korea. In part 3, Krystal prepares a no-expenses-spared surprise hocance (hotel vacation) for Jessica. It was planned because Krystal had to juggle f(x)'s promotions on top of her personal obligations as a model. Red Light swept the weekly charts in the final week of July. They also did full body and foot massages, tried pan seared scallop with cauliflower Velouté sauce, fish pot pie, asparagus and fries sides and cocktails based on their birthstone (diamond, gin and tonic for Jessica, opal for Krystal). While they have their midnight dinner, this also marks the final day of filming after the entire project that started back in February, and started filming in May.
10	August 5, 2014	Final episode, that continues their thoughts of being in this project, Krystal got her favourite tenderloin dish. Jessica and Krystal's honest opinions flows after being inebriated, in which they feel bad that the bulk of the recordings for the show are done while they are at their busiest, and the fact that they can be around each other in silence for nearly an hour at a time. Krystal prepares a final surprise gift to Jessica since she was planning the entire trip: A full window sets of photo displays of their time in the show, which includes a hand-written letter on the window. Krystal pulled off the feat after having two adjacent rooms linked up, so she can hide next door, where the production crew would be. This would also mark the final night together, as they part for their individual work schedules again, as previously unaired clips are also shown, including Jessica losing the production crew while driving in LA, and their night trip to Disneyland. Jessica also taught Krystal basic sewing and started having design ideas for sunglasses. Krystal then tries to become a model for Jessica's Blanc & Eclare, which is about to launch after the show ended. They also showed Jessica's attempt to make Sangria with Hyoyeon and Tiffany.

== Reception ==
Jessica & Krystal received a 4.6% online-streaming rating for its 1st episode, which is 15 times higher than the ratings for the channel's previous program at the same time-slot.
