= Jessica Jung =

American and South Korean singer (born 1989)

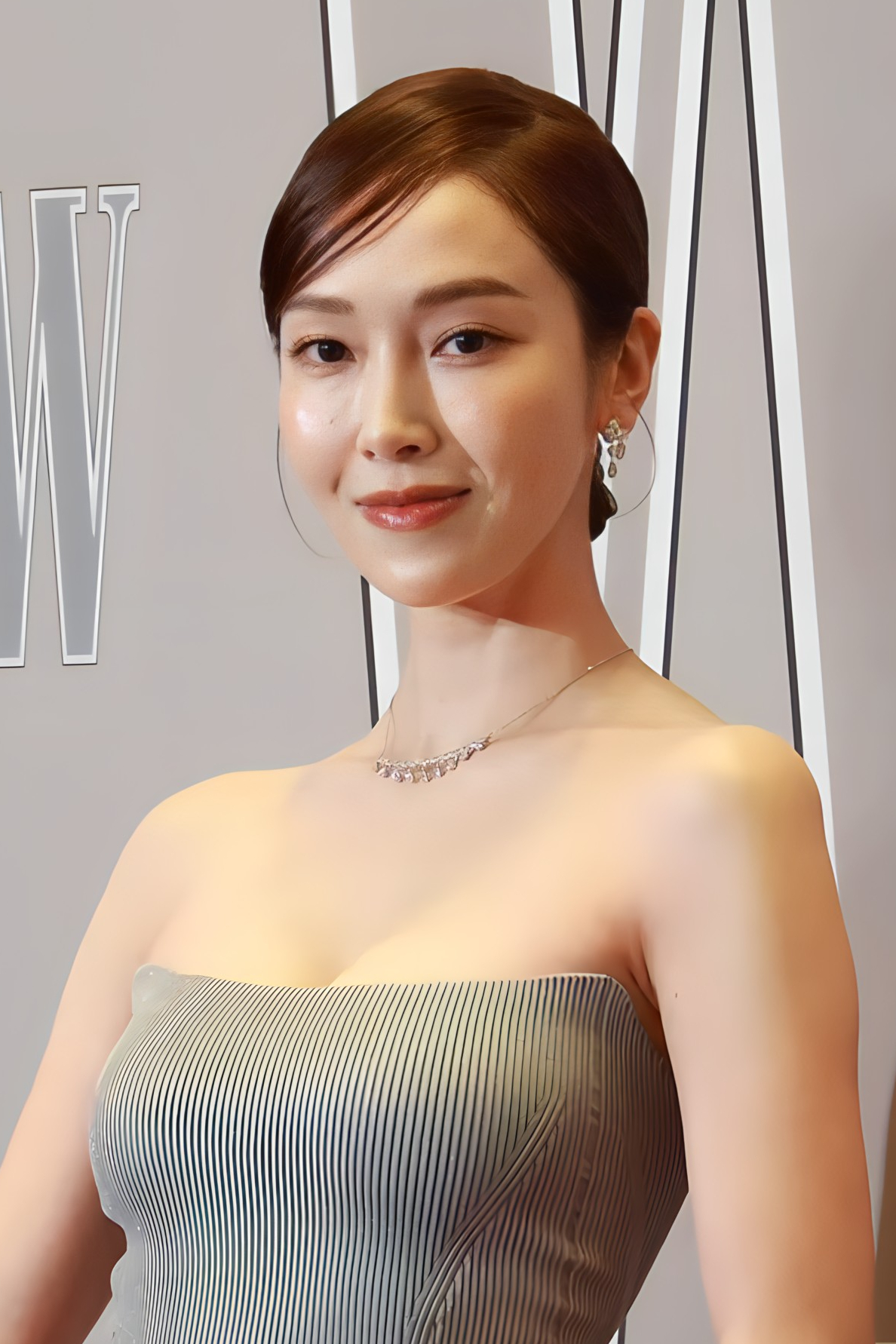
- Jung in 2024
- Born: April 18, 1989 (age 37); San Francisco, California, U.S.
- Other name: Jung Soo-yeon
- Citizenship: United States; South Korea
- Occupations: Singer; songwriter; actress; author; businesswoman
- Relatives: Krystal Jung (sister)
- Musical career
- Origin: South Korea
- Genres: K-pop; R&B
- Instrument: Vocals
- Years active: 2007–present
- Labels: SM; Coridel; UTA
- Member of: X-Sister
- Formerly of: Girls' Generation; SM Town
- Website: coridelent.com/artist/jessica

Korean name
- Hangul: 정수연
- RR: Jeong Suyeon
- MR: Chŏng Suyŏn

Signature
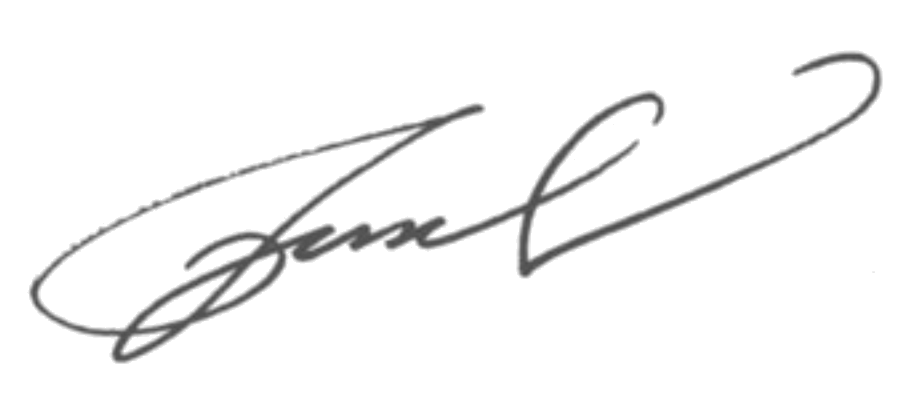

Jessica Jung (born April 18, 1989) is an American and South Korean singer-songwriter, actress, author, and businesswoman. She is best known for her work as a former member of the South Korean girl group Girls' Generation. As an actress, Jung portrayed Elle Woods in the Korean version of the musical Legally Blonde in 2010 and played a role in the television drama Wild Romance in 2012.

In August 2014, Jung established a fashion brand, Blanc & Eclare. The next month, she was dismissed from Girls' Generation, and in 2015, she ended her contract with SM Entertainment. In 2016, Jung released her debut solo album With Love, J. Her debut novel Shine was released in September 2020.

== Early life ==
Jessica Jung was born on April 18, 1989, in San Francisco. While on vacation in South Korea, she and her sister, Krystal, were spotted in a shopping mall by a member of SM Entertainment; she later joined the company in 2000. She spent seven years as a trainee before debuting as part of the Korean girl group Girls' Generation. Jung attended Korea Kent Foreign School during her teenage years.

== Career ==
=== 2007–2014: Girls' Generation and solo activities ===
Jung was the first member of Girls' Generation to sign with SM Entertainment in 2000. In 2007, she was chosen as a member of the nine-member girl group that debuted on August 5, 2007. In addition, to her group activities, Jung released two singles with Seohyun and Tiffany: "Love Hate" (Korean: "오빠 나빠", lit. Bad Older Brother) and "Mabinogi (It's Fantastic!)" for the Nexon game Mabinogi. Jung collaborated with 8Eight for the song "I Love You" from their second album, Infinity, which was released on March 3, 2008. Though she was the one singing the harmony and adlibs, she is not seen in the music video. In addition, she had various duets — one with Shinee member, Onew, called "One Year Later", and one with Park Myung-soo, "Naengmyeon" as part of a project group in the show Infinite Challenge. She sang the "Seoul Song" with Super Junior's Leeteuk, Sungmin, Donghae, Siwon, Ryeowook and Kyuhyun and fellow group members Taeyeon, Sunny, Sooyoung and Seohyun. Jung made her musical theatre debut in the South Korean production of Legally Blonde, alongside Lee Ha-nui and Kim Ji-woo; the production opened on November 14, 2009. The same year, she took a special part on the show Infinity Challenge for their summer special, in which she was chosen to sing a duet entitled "Naengmyun" with Park Myung-soo, one of the MCs.

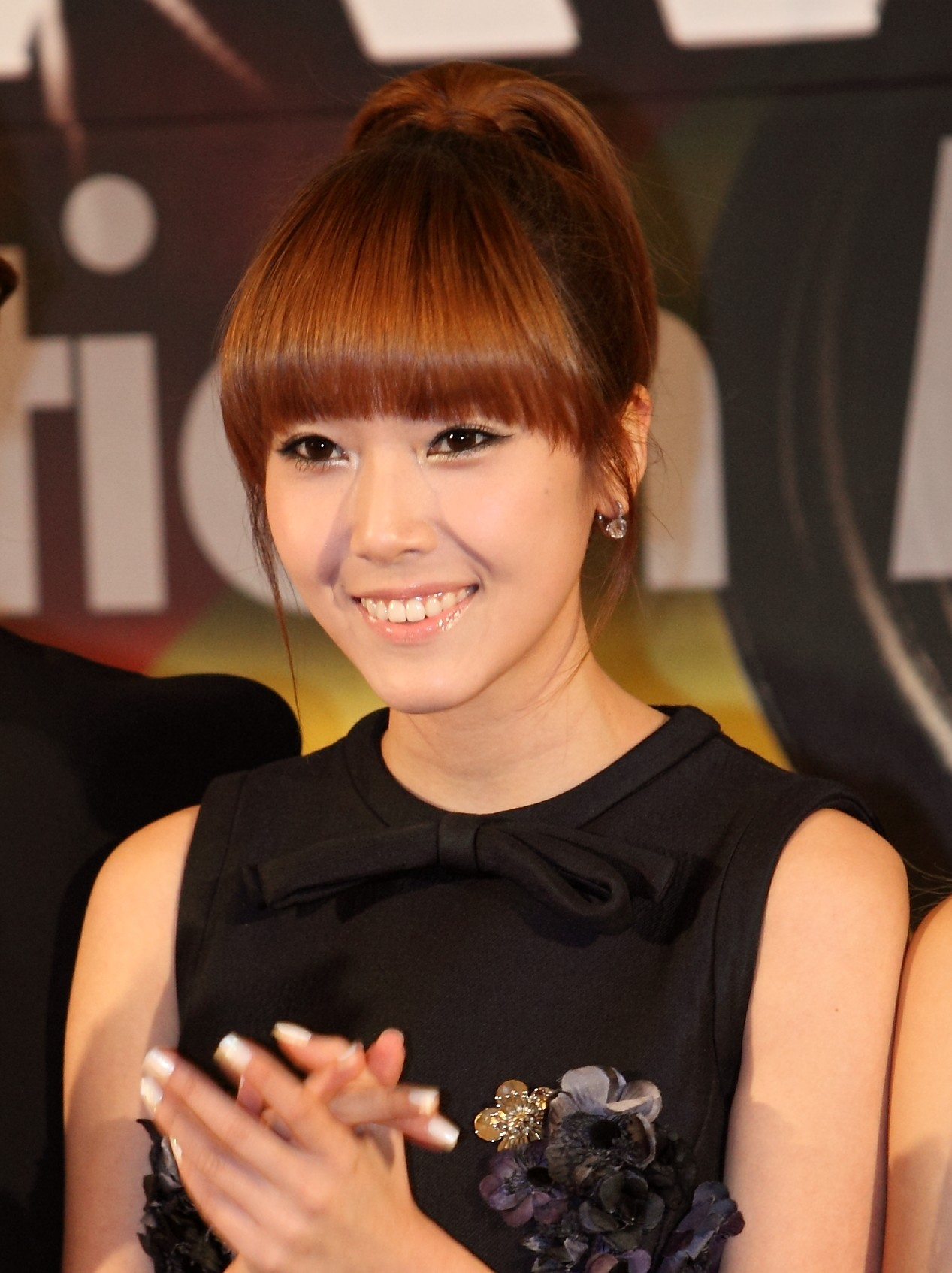
Jung at the 2010 Melon Music Awards

In March 2010, she had a cameo role on SBS' Oh! My Lady. In May 2010, Jung became a regular guest on the show Happy Birthday until she withdrew on June 7, 2010, due to Girls' Generation's overseas activities. She was also a regular guest on the show Star King with fellow member Yuri. Jung released a digital single titled "Sweet Delight" on October 13, 2010. In 2011, Jung participated on the soundtrack of the KBS drama Romance Town with the song "Because Tears Are Overflowing" (Korean: 눈물이 넘쳐서). Jung made her acting debut in Wild Romance in 2012. In the same year, Jung returned to musical theatre once again with Legally Blonde, alongside Jung Eun-ji and Choi Woori. Her first performance was on November 28. In the same year, Jung sang "What To Do" (featuring Kim Jin-pyo) for the drama Wild Romance, "Butterfly" (featuring Krystal) for To the Beautiful You, "Heart Road" for Dream of the Emperor, as well as "My Lifestyle", a Hyundai i30's commercial song. In 2013, she had "The One Like You" for Dating Agency: Cyrano.

In 2014, Jung released "Say Yes"' for the Make Your Move soundtrack, featuring her sister, Krystal, and Exo's former member, Kris. In August, Jung launched her own fashion line, Blanc, which was later renamed Blanc & Eclare. There are now sixty stores located around the world. Jung and her sister Krystal starred in their own reality television show Jessica & Krystal. It premiered on June 3 and consisted of ten episodes.

On September 30, 2014, Jung announced on her personal Weibo account that she had been "forced out" of the group. SM Entertainment later confirmed this, stating that Jung would no longer be a member of Girls' Generation. The company also stated that Girls' Generation would continue to promote with eight members while it would still manage her solo activities. Jung also released a statement of her own through her fashion company, Blanc Group, explaining that she had been asked to leave Girls' Generation by the agency and the other members of the group. Jung's final song with Girls' Generation was "Divine", which was included in the repackaged version of their Japanese greatest hits album, The Best.

=== 2015–2016: Acting and solo debut ===
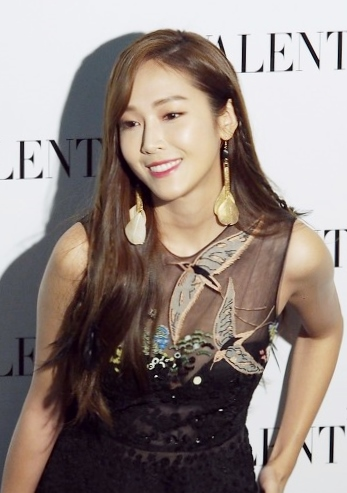
Jung at the Marina Bay Sands Valentino event in 2016

In 2015, Jung was confirmed to be the female lead in the Chinese romantic comedy film titled I Love That Crazy Little Thing, alongside William Chan and Nicholas Tse. The film was released in August 2016, and Jung collaborated with Chan on the theme song "Love! Love! Aloha!". On August 6, 2015, SM Entertainment released an official statement stating that the company and the former member of Girls' Generation had officially parted ways. The following year, Jung was confirmed to be the female lead in the autobiographical film about Stephon Marbury titled My Other Home, alongside Marbury himself. She was also cast in the short action comedy Two Bellmen Three alongside Ki Hong Lee. She took a part in Chinese sport's variety show YES! Coach as well, where she participated in a swimming competition after being trained by professional swimmer Sun Yang. Jung then became the main host of the beauty show Beauty Bible, alongside Kim Jae-kyung.

In February 2016, Jung announced that her first solo album would be released under her new agency, Coridel Entertainment. In April 2016, representatives announced that Jung would release her first album in May. On April 30, Coridel Entertainment released the track list which included the title track "Fly" featuring Fabolous. Jung wrote and composed four of the six tracks. The name of the extended play was revealed to be With Love, J, and was released on May 17, 2016, along with the lead single, "Fly". The music video for "Fly" amassed over 2 million views within 24 hours of its release. A video for the second single, "Love Me the Same", was released the following day on May 18, 2016. With Love, J topped eight music charts, and also ranked first on the Hanteo Weekly Chart and Gaon Weekly Album Chart. The English-language version of the EP, released on May 27, features five of the original six tracks. The same year, Jung held an Asian fan-meet tour which commenced in Seoul on June 1, continuing on to other countries such as Thailand, Taiwan, and Japan. The tour ended on November 5 in Shanghai. Further shows scheduled to take place in Singapore, Indonesia, Philippines, and Vietnam were cancelled due to health problems and concerns of overwork for Jung before the release of her next album. In December, Jung made a comeback with a Christmas EP called Wonderland, composed of six songs, four of which she took part in writing. The album, and its eponymous title track, was released on December 10. It also has an English-language version, with four of the six original Korean tracks.

=== 2017–2019: My Decade, and debut novel ===
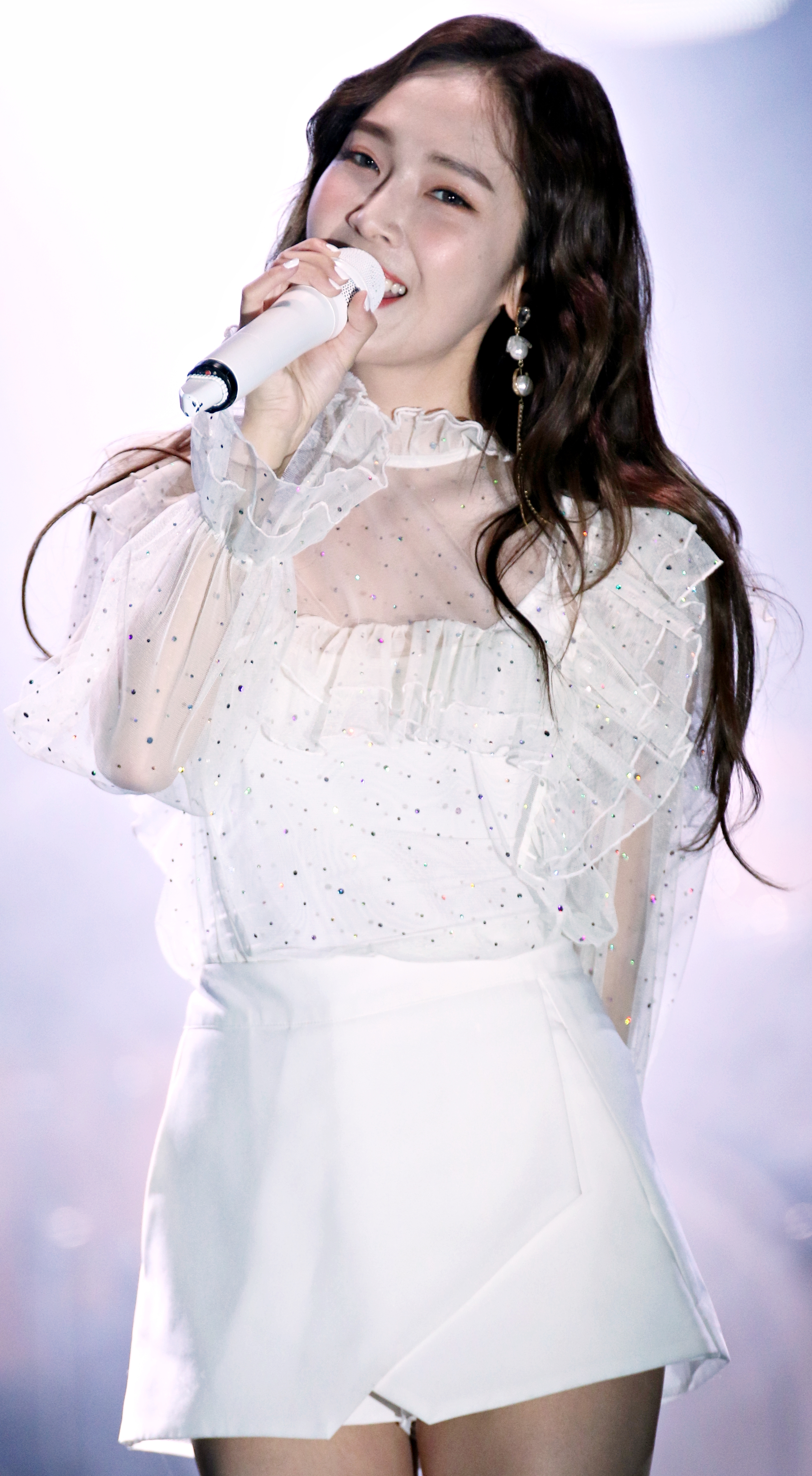
Jung performing in Singapore in July 2017

On April 14, 2017, Coridel Entertainment released a series of teaser pictures confirming that Jung was set to make her first comeback of the year with a digital single titled "Because It's Spring", on April 18, 2017. In the same month, Forbes included Jung in their 30 Under 30 Asia 2017 list which comprises 30 influential people under 30 years old who have made substantial effect in their fields. "Because It's Spring" was later included on her third EP My Decade, released on August 9, 2017, to celebrate her 10th anniversary since debut. Jung took part in writing five of the six songs on the album. The lead single "Summer Storm" and its music video were released on the same day. In July 2017, Jung embarked on her first mini-concert tour titled "On Cloud Nine". The tour's first show was in Taipei, taking place on July 29, 2017. Jung also held shows in Seoul, Osaka, Tokyo, and Bangkok as part of the tour. A show scheduled to take place in Hong Kong on October 15, 2017, was cancelled due to Typhoon Khanun affecting the area. The final show of "On Cloud Nine" took place in Macau on March 3, 2018.

In May 2018, it was revealed that Jung had signed with United Talent Agency. The agency will represent her in North America for music, film, television and endorsements. In October, Jung held a second mini-concert in Taiwan titled "Golden Night". On December 14, Jung released a Christmas single titled "One More Christmas" in collaboration with South Korean makeup brand Amuse Cosmetics.

In June 2019, Jung and Krystal filmed their second reality show in the United States. Jung's single, "Call Me Before You Sleep" was digitally released on September 26 and features rapper Giriboy in the Korean version. The Japanese version was physically released on October 9 and featured Sandaime J Soul Brothers' CrazyBoy. The song was produced by Cha Cha Malone. She held a fan-meet in Japan, XOXO Jessica Jung Fan Meeting, on October 2, with girl group GWSN appearing as the opening act. Further shows were held in Taiwan and Thailand, on October 19 and 27 respectively. In the same month, it was announced that Jung would publish her debut novel, Shine, in fall 2020 as part of a two-book deal with Simon Pulse, an imprint of Simon & Schuster. Glasstown Entertainment sold the novel to eleven foreign countries, and is developing a film adaptation produced by Matthew Kaplan of ACE Entertainment. The novel was released on September 30, 2020, debuting at number five on The New York Times Best Seller list for Young Adult Hardcover in the issue dated October 18. A sequel, Bright, was released on May 10, 2022.

=== 2022–present: Chinese activities, and Beep Beep ===
From May 20 to August 5, 2022, Jung participated in the third season of Sisters Who Make Waves, a Chinese survival reality television show where female celebrities over 30 years old compete to debut in a ten-member girl group. She eventually placed second in the finals and debuted in X-Sister. Jung also took part in the musical reality show Sound Like Summer Flowers as a team manager. She later reunited with her castmates from Sisters Who Make Waves to star in the reality show Seaside Band, which premiered in November 2022.

On November 7, 2023, it was announced Jung would be releasing her fourth extended play titled Beep Beep on November 22. Along with the release, Jung embarked on her concert tour titled Diamond Dreams. The tour began in Macau on November 25 and continued to Singapore, Kuala Lumpur, Taipei, and Bangkok. During her concerts, Jung performed Girls' Generation songs for the first time since her departure from the group.

On July 30, 2026, it was announced Jung will reunite with Park Myung-soo at the 2026 Infinite Challenge Run in Gyeongju which will be held at Gyeongju Civic Stadium on September 19. It will be Jung's first time performing in South Korea in twelve years.

== Other ventures ==
=== Endorsements ===
Jung has also endorsed a number of brands of various products. Besides her endorsements with Girls' Generation, she also became a model for Chinese sports brand Li-Ning and South Korean bag brand Lapalette with her sister Krystal in 2014. On April 30, 2020, Jung was announced as the new global ambassador for multinational cosmetics, skin care, fragrance, and personal care company Revlon.

=== Business ===
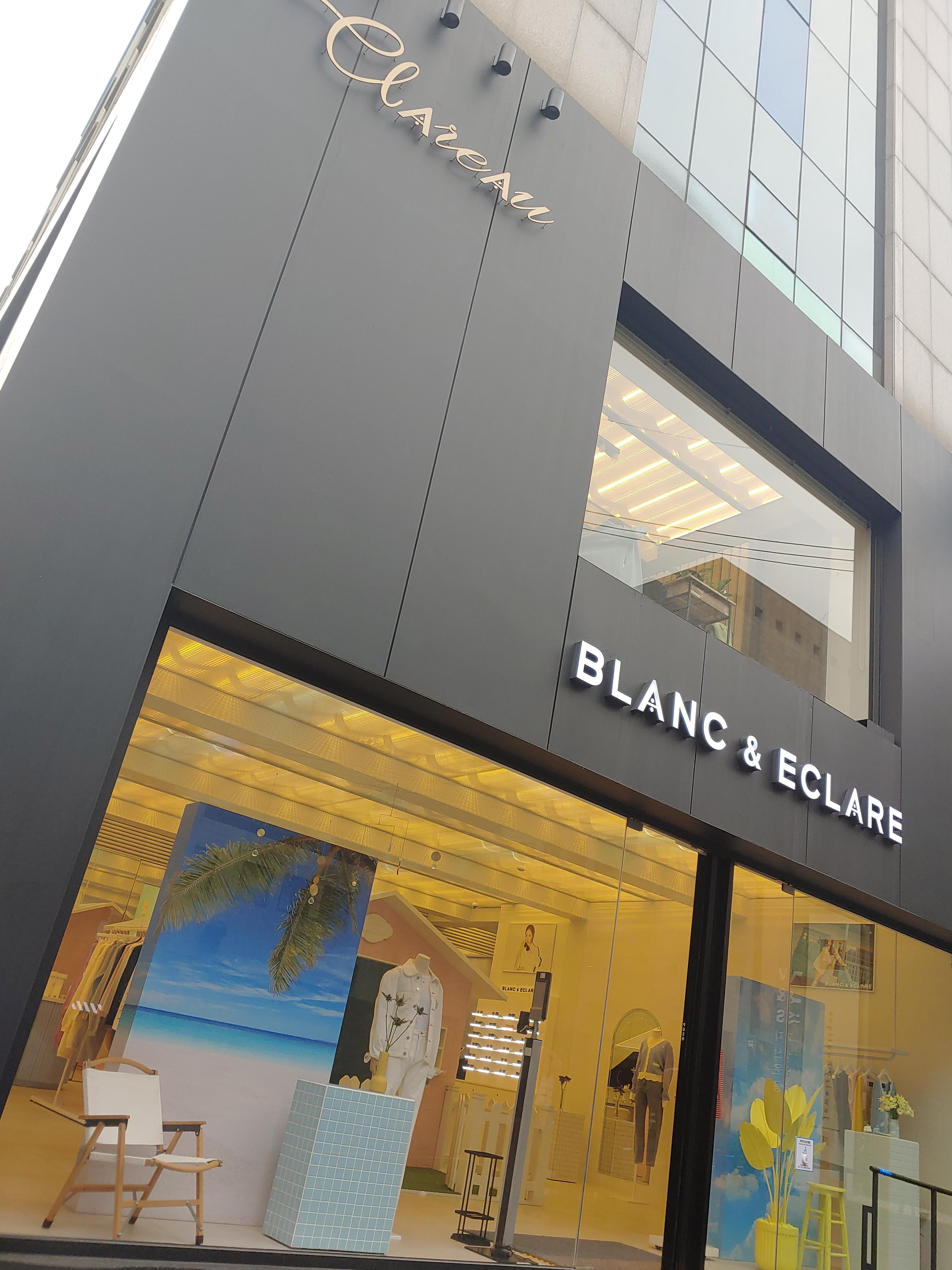
Building in Seoul housing Jung's fashion and restaurant businesses.

Jung launched her fashion brand Blanc & Eclare in August 2014. Her first restaurant named Clareau opened on January 19, 2021, at the Blanc & Eclare flagship store building in Cheongdam-dong, Seoul.

== Personal life ==
During a mini concert at Taiwan in July 2017, Jung revealed that her birth name, as on her passport, is simply "Jessica Jung", whereas her Korean name "Sooyeon" was only obtained on a later date due to "necessity" while working in South Korea. She describes herself as "Christian curious" and goes to church.

== Discography ==
=== Extended plays ===
- With Love, J (2016)
- Wonderland (2016)
- My Decade (2017)
- Beep Beep (2023)

== Filmography ==
=== Film ===
Year	Title	Role	Notes	Ref.
2012	I AM.	Herself	Biographical film of SM Town	
2016	I Love That Crazy Little Thing	Qian Qian		
2017	Two Bellmen Three	Mi-na Kim		
2017	My Other Home	Yang Chen	Biographical film for Stephon Marbury	

=== Television series ===
Year	Title	Role	Notes	Ref.
2008	Unstoppable Marriage	Bulgwang-dong's Seven Princesses Gang	Cameo	
2009	Hilarious Housewives	English teacher	Cameo	
2010	Oh! My Lady	Herself	Cameo	
2012	Wild Romance	Kang Jong-hee		

=== Television shows ===
Year	Title	Role	Notes	Ref.
2014	Jessica & Krystal	Main cast	With Krystal Jung	
2016	Beauty Bible	Co-host	With Kim Jae-kyung	
2017	Mix Nine	Herself	Coridel Entertainment representative	
2021	Jessica & Krystal – US Road Trip	Main cast	With Krystal Jung	
2022	Sisters Who Make Waves 3	Contestant	Chinese survival reality show that determined X-Sister members Finished 2nd	
2023	Great Dance Crew	Manager	Season 2	

== Theater ==
Year	Title	Role	Notes	Ref.
2009–2010, 2012–2013	Legally Blonde	Elle Woods	Lead role	

== Bibliography ==
Title	Release date	Publisher	Ref.
Shine	September 29, 2020	Simon & Schuster	
Bright	May 10, 2022	Simon & Schuster	

== Awards and nominations ==
Name of the award ceremony, year presented, category, nominee of the award, and the result of the nomination
Award ceremony	Year	Category	Nominee(s) / work(s)	Result	Ref.
Barbie & Ken Awards	2012	Korean Barbie Award	Jessica Jung	Won	
Fashionista Awards	2017	Global Icon	Jessica Jung	Nominated	
Mission Hills World Celebrity Pro-Am	2014	Popularity Award	Jessica Jung	Won	
Mission Hills World Celebrity Pro-Am	2014	Best Dressed on the Red Carpet Award	Jessica Jung	Nominated	
SBS MTV Best of the Best	2012	Best Cameo	Sherlock	Nominated	
Seoul International Drama Awards	2013	Most Popular Drama OST	"Butterfly" (with Krystal Jung)	Nominated	
Sohu Fashion Awards	2014	Asian Fashion Icon	Jessica Jung	Won	
Sohu Fashion Awards	2022	Fashionista Award	Jessica Jung	Won	
Style Icon Awards	2014	Top 10 Style Icons	Jessica Jung (with Krystal Jung); Jessica & Krystal	Nominated	
The Musical Awards	2013	Popularity Award	Legally Blonde	Won	
Yahoo! Asia Buzz Awards	2014	Most Searched Korean Female Artist	Jessica Jung	Won	
Yahoo! Asia Buzz Awards	2015	Asian Popularity Award	Jessica Jung	Won	
YinYueTai V Chart Awards	2016	Hot Trend Artist of Korea Award	Jessica Jung	Won	
