= Wonderland (EP) =

EP by Jessica
- Released: December 10, 2016
- Recorded: 2016
- Genre: Electropop
- Length: 22:36
- Language: Korean; English
- Label: Coridel

Jessica chronology
With Love, J (2016)	Wonderland (2016)	My Decade (2017)

Singles from Wonderland
- 1. "Wonderland" Released: December 10, 2016

Wonderland is the second extended play by American and South Korean singer Jessica. The Korean-language edition consisting of six songs was released worldwide by Coridel Entertainment on December 10, 2016, while an English-language version featuring four songs (with the exclusion of "Beautiful" and "Tonight") was released on December 30, 2016. The EP was Jessica's second music release following her departure from South Korean girl group Girls' Generation in September 2014. The song "Wonderland" was released as the EP's single on December 10, 2016.

The album was a commercial success, peaking atop the Gaon Album Chart and has sold over 38,000 copies in South Korea. It additionally peaked at number seven on the US World Albums chart.

== Track listing ==
Wonderland — Korean edition
No.	Title	Lyrics	Music	Producer(s)	Length
1.	"Wonderland"	Jessica	Jessica Jung * Martin K Kleveland * Andrea Sjo Engen * Jens Hjerto * Marcus Ulstad Niksen * Eric "Vekz" Fernandez * Tatiana "Tatu" Matthews * Julien "Jdot" Cross * Karriem "Kmack" Mark	Kleveland	3:19
2.	"Dancing on the Moon"	Jessica	Jessica Jung * Kleveland * Kim Ofstand * Vekz * Tatu * Jdot * Kmack * Cory Kwon (Note: additional music credit)	Kleveland * Ofstand	3:59
3.	"Celebrate"	Jessica	Jessica Jung * Jdot * Tatu * Vekz * Kmack	Jdot (Note: also arranger) * Kmack (Note: co-producer) * Vekz (Note: arranger)	3:26
4.	"World of Dreams"	Jessica	Jessica Jung * Jdot * Tatu * Vekz * Kmack	Jdot * Kmack * Vekz * Jay Kim	3:29
5.	"Beautiful"	Jay Kim * Kim Eun-su	REASON' * Ellen Berg	REASON'	4:26
6.	"Tonight"	Jay Kim * Kim Je-hwi	Kim Je-hwi * Kim Hu-won	Kim Je-hwi	3:41
Total length:					22:36

Wonderland — English edition
No.	Title	Lyrics	Music	Producer(s)	Length
1.	"Wonderland"	Jessica	Jessica Jung; Kleveland; Sjo Engen; Hjerto; Ulstad Niksen; Vekz; Tatu; Jdot; Kmack	Kleveland	3:19
2.	"Dancing on the Moon"	Jessica	Jessica Jung; Kleveland; Kim Ofstand; Vekz; Tatu; Jdot; Kmack; Cory Kwon	Kleveland; Ofstand	3:59
3.	"Celebrate"	Jessica	Jessica Jung; Jdot; Tatu; Vekz; Kmack	Jdot; Kmack; Vekz	3:26
4.	"World of Dreams"	Jessica	Jessica Jung; Jdot; Tatu; Vekz; Kmack	Jdot; Kmack; Vekz; Jay Kim	3:29

== Charts ==
Chart (2016)	Peak position
Japan (Oricon)	85
South Korea (Gaon)	1
US World Albums (Billboard)	7

=== Year-end chart ===
Chart (2016)	Position
South Korea (Gaon)	75

== Release history ==
Region	Release date	Edition	Format	Distributor
Worldwide	December 10, 2016	Digital download	Korean-language edition	Coridel Entertainment
South Korea	December 13, 2016	CD	Korean-language edition	Coridel Entertainment
Worldwide	December 30, 2016	Digital download	English-language version	Coridel Entertainment
