= Blanc & Eclare =

Fashion brand

Blanc Group Ltd.
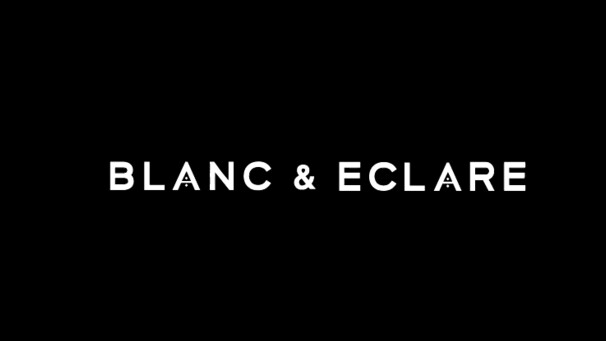
- Trade name: Blanc & Eclare
- Formerly: Blanc
- Company type: Private company limited by shares
- Industry: Fashion
- Founded: 2014; 12 years ago
- Founder: Jessica Jung
- Headquarters: Hong Kong
- Products: Eyewear, clothing, accessories, skincare
- Website: blancgroup.com

Blanc Group Ltd., trading as Blanc & Eclare, is a fashion brand producing eyewear, denim, clothing, skincare, and accessories. Korean-American singer and actress Jessica Jung launched the label in August 2014, initially naming it Blanc, which means "white" in French. Eclare, derived from the Latin root clara (clarity, brightness) was later added.

== Locations ==
Blanc & Eclare merchandise is sold in around sixty stores in locations such as Seoul, New York, Beijing, Hong Kong, Bangkok, Taiwan, Shanghai, Tokyo, and Vancouver. In December 2016, Blanc & Eclare opened its first U.S. flagship store in the SoHo neighborhood of New York. In January 2021, a second flagship store was opened in Seoul, South Korea.

== Description ==
Blanc & Eclare creates clean-cut, modern-classic pieces. The styles and names of each pair of sunglasses are based on international cities.

== Collaborations and philanthropy ==
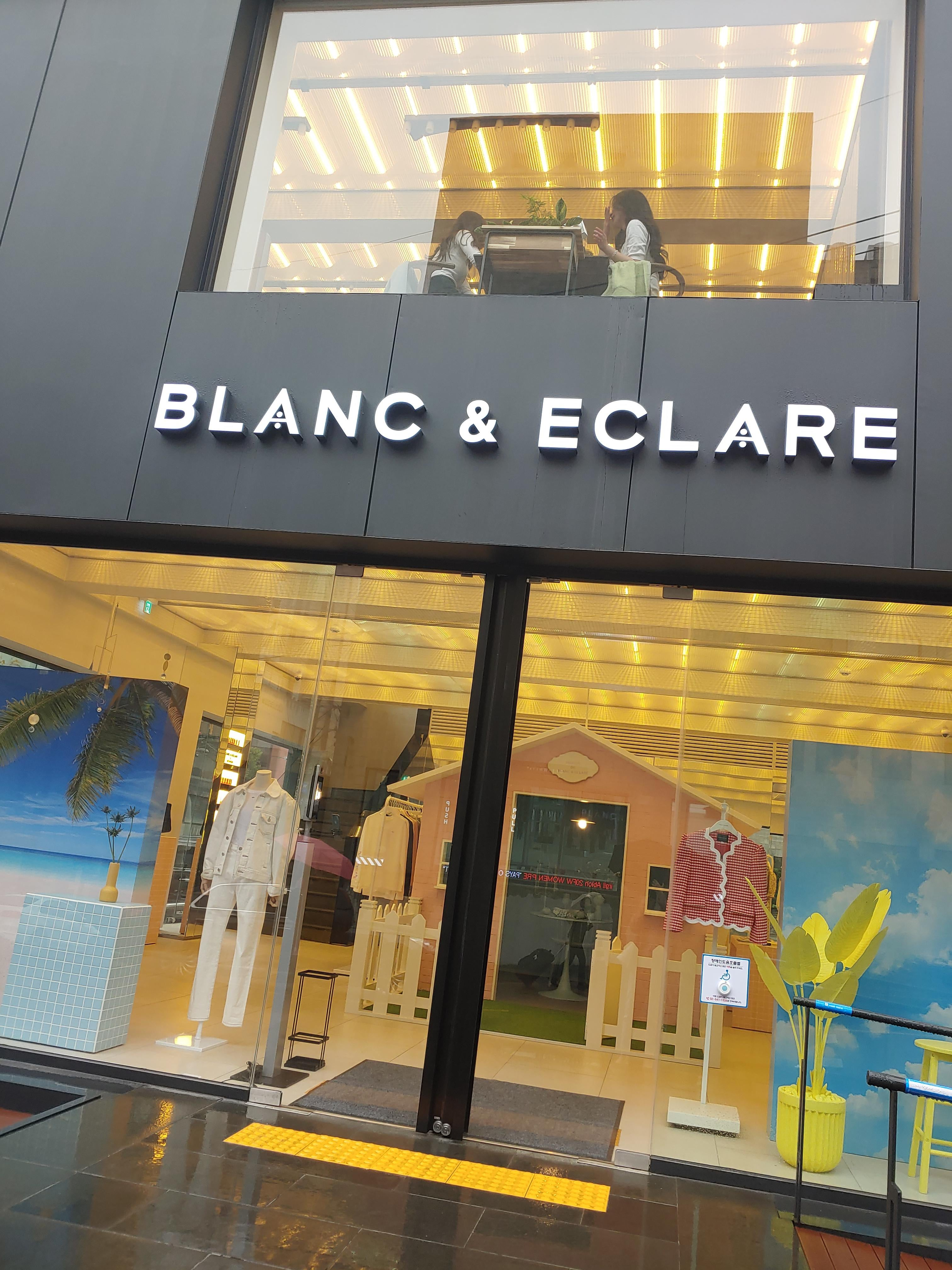
Blanc & Eclare's flagship store in Seoul, South Korea.

In October 2014, Blanc & Eclare began to collaborate with the charity Help For Children, which is an organization that aims to prevent and treat child abuse. Through a design competition, Blanc & Eclare invites the public to design their own pair of sunglasses. The winning designs join the Blanc & Eclare collection, and 100% of profits from their sales go to the 'Help For Children' foundation.

In 2018, Blanc & Eclare announced a new package room collaboration with The Landmark Mandarin Oriental, Hong Kong that included a lounge-wear set exclusively designed for guests. The same year, Blanc & Eclare also announced a limited edition collaboration with South Korean model Irene Kim, called "Love is Good". In September, Blanc & Eclare and Keds collaborated to celebrate New York Fashion Week with an exclusive sneaker customization event. A limited number of buyers were eligible to receive a pair of Blanc & Eclare customized Triple Kick sneakers from Keds signed by Jung. In October, the brand teamed up with Zalora, to launch a limited-edition bag collection designed by Jung named "Poppy". A second collection in collaboration with Zalora was launched in November, named "Rosie". In December, Blanc & Eclare collaborated with Casetify to release an exclusive capsule collection of iPhone cases.

In May 2019, Blanc & Eclare collaborated with Vogue Korea for their second annual Vogue Market. The limited-edition collection consisted of a canvas mini bucket bag available in four different colors with detachable key-rings, and a logo ball cap.

In November 2020, Blanc & Eclare released six limited-edition lipsticks in collaboration with beauty brand Revlon.

== Lawsuit ==
On September 27, 2021, Hong Kong-based newspaper The Standard reported a lawsuit filed by Joy King Enterprises against the label's Chairman and Chief Executive Officer Tyler Kwon. The company alleged Kwon failed to pay back a principal and interest loan total of $6.8 million, originally loaned by Spectra SPC between 2016 and 2017 and transferred to Joy King Enterprises in August 2021. In an interview with Korean newspaper My Daily, Kwon stated he had come to an agreement with Spectra SPC to extend the loan term due to COVID-19, an agreement he claimed Joy King Enterprises failed to honor.
