= Dating Agency: Cyrano =

2013 South Korean television series

- Promotional poster
- Genre: Romance; Comedy
- Based on: Cyrano Agency
- Written by: Shin Jae-won
- Directed by: Kang Kyung-hoon
- Starring: Lee Jong-hyuk; Choi Soo-young; Lee Chun-hee; Hong Jong-hyun; Cho Yoon-woo
- Composer: Park Se-joon
- Country of origin: South Korea
- Original language: Korean
- No. of episodes: 16

Production
- Executive producer: Bae Jong-pyeong
- Producers: Kang Hee-joon; Lee Ye-rim
- Cinematography: Kang Seung-gi; Hong Seung-hyuk
- Editors: Yoo Seong-yeop; Baek Eun-ja
- Running time: 45 minutes
- Production companies: Oh! Boy Project; CJ E&M

Original release
- Network: tvN
- Release: May 27 – July 16, 2013

Related
- Cyrano Agency; Cool Guys, Hot Ramen; Flower Band; Flower Boys Next Door

Dating Agency: Cyrano (Korean: 연애조작단; 시라노; RR: Yeonaejojakdan; sirano) is a 2013 South Korean television series starring Lee Jong-hyuk, Choi Soo-young, Lee Chun-hee, Hong Jong-hyun and Cho Yoon-woo. Based on the 2010 romantic comedy film Cyrano Agency, the series is about a dating agency that orchestrates romantic scenarios for paying clients, all in an effort to raise enough money to save an old theater.

The early working title was Flower Boy Dating Agency (꽃미남 연애조작단; Kkonminam yeonaejojakdan). It is the fourth installment of cable channel tvN's "Oh! Boy" series of Flower Boy programming targeted at the teenage demographic, following Cool Guys, Hot Ramen (2011), Flower Band (2012), and Flower Boys Next Door (2013).

== Synopsis ==
This drama is about a dating agency that orchestrates romantic scenarios for paying clients, all in an effort to raise enough money to save an old theater. After Seo Byung-hoon (Lee Jong-hyuk) loses his best friend in an accident, the once-renowned theater director suffers from guilt and decides to save his late friend's theater troupe. Using his masterful stage skills, he forms the Cyrano Dating Agency.

== Cast ==
- Lee Jong-hyuk as Seo Byung-hoon
  - Lee Jae-joon as young Byung-hoon

After he loses his best friend in an accident, the once-renowned theater director suffers from guilt and decides to save his late friend's theatre troupe. Using his masterful stage skills, he forms the Cyrano Dating Agency.

- Choi Soo-young as Gong Min-young

A romantic, and one of the members of the dating agency. She believes the true feelings of her clients are more important than profit for the agency and is attracted to Byung-hoon.

- Lee Chun-hee as Cha "Master" Seung-pyo

The chef of the restaurant that's next door to the theater where the dating agency is housed. He is the loan shark who originally lent the money to Do-il for the Cyrano theater, and is later revealed to be Do-il's younger brother. He is attracted to Min-young.

- Hong Jong-hyun as Moo-jin

Recruited into the dating agency because of his genius engineering skills, he is the brains behind all hi-tech gadgets used by the agency in the field.

- Cho Yoon-woo as Ah-rang

A 19-year-old high schooler who dreams of becoming a theater actor.

- Bae Seong-woo as Lee Min-shik
- Kim Min-kyo as Go Young-dal

Min-shik and Young-dal are Seung-pyo's loan shark goons, who intimidate Byung-hoon into paying his debt, and occasionally join in the agency's missions. Both of them eventually become Cyrano's prominent actors.

- Ha Yeon-joo as Hye-ri

A waitress at Cha Seung-pyo's restaurant. She is attracted to Moo-jin and later starts dating him.

- Kim Jung-hwa as Yoon Yi-seol

Byung-hoon's first love from high school, who ended up marrying Do-il. She was the one driving during Do-il's accident, which causes numbness to her right hand at times.

- Lee Min-woo as Go Do-il

Do-il, Yi-seol and Byung-hoon were best friends in high school and founders of the Cyrano Theater Troupe. He later married Yi-seol, and died in a car accident.

=== Special appearances ===
- Ji Jin-hee as Seon Jung-nam, Min-young's F-ranked client at her old agency (ep. 1)
- Lee Chung-ah as ballerina Seol Yoo-jin, the A-ranked client Jung-nam likes (ep. 1)
- Choi Won-young as the sommelier Yoo-jin likes (ep. 1)
- Im Hyung-joon as veterinarian Jin Joon-hyuk (ep. 1–3)
- Lee Yoon-ji as librarian Ma Jae-in (ep. 1–3)
- Taemin as idol singer Ray / Yang Ho-yeol (e.p 3–5)
- Jo Yun-seo as Min Se-kyung, the girl Ho-yeol has a crush on, but who likes Arang (ep. 3–5)
- Lee Kwang-soo as Choi Dal-in, a baker who's a masochist in love (ep. 6–8)
- Goo Jae-yee as Dokgo Mi-jin, a chef and Dal-in's former rival in a cooking competition (ep. 6–8, 14)
- Lee Yong-joo as Yeom Chi-moo, Mi-jin's chef ex-boyfriend who betrayed her (ep. 8)
- Jung Yu-mi as Bong Soo-ah, a creepy-looking "Ghost Girl" who hides behind her hair and can't look men in the eye (ep. 8–9)
- Gong Yoo as the magician Soo-ah likes (ep. 9)
- Ye Ji-won as nurse Lee Hae-shim (ep. 10–12)
- Im Won-hee as firefighter Kim Chul-soo (ep. 10–12)
- Yoon So-jung as Madam Hwang, Moo-jin's grandmother and a dementia patient (ep. 10–12)

== Original soundtrack ==
1. Chance! - Peppertones
2. In the Same Storm - Big Baby Driver
3. 어떤 설레임 (A Certain Heart Fluttering) - Ra.D
4. 그대라는 한 사람 (The One Like You) - Jessica Jung
5. Take My Hands Tonight - Big Baby Driver
6. Chance! (Bossanova Ver.) - Peppertones
7. Say Hello to the World - Big Baby Driver
8. 그대라는 한 사람 (The One Like You) (Inst.) - Various Artists
9. 어떤 설레임 (A Certain Heart Fluttering) (Inst.) - Various Artists
10. Chance! (Guitar Ver.) - Peppertones
11. 연애조작단; 시라노 (Dating Agency; Cyrano) - Various Artists
12. 수상한 연인 (Suspicious Lover) - Various Artists
13. 작전 시작 (Operation Starts) - Various Artists
14. Miss Operation - Various Artists
15. 꿈속을 걷다 (Walk My Dreams) - Various Artists
16. Dark Spy - Various Artists
17. Missing You A Lot - Various Artists
18. 무언의 대화 (The Unspoken Dialogue) - Various Artists
19. 나른할 시간 (Relaxing Time) - Various Artists
20. 기다리는 마음 (Waiting for the Heart) - Various Artists
21. I Am Here - Various Artists
22. Supernova - Various Artists
23. Psychedelic - Various Artists

== Ratings ==
In this table, the blue numbers represent the lowest ratings and the red numbers represent the highest ratings.

| Ep. | Original broadcast date | Average audience share |
| Ep. | Original broadcast date | AGB Nielsen |
| Ep. | Original broadcast date | Nationwide |
|---|---|---|
| 1 | May 27, 2013 | 0.311% |
| 2 | May 28, 2013 | 0.368% |
| 3 | June 3, 2013 | 0.291% |
| 4 | June 4, 2013 | 0.335% |
| 5 | June 10, 2013 | 0.271% |
| 6 | June 11, 2013 | 0.188% |
| 7 | June 17, 2013 | 0.291% |
| 8 | June 18, 2013 | 0.310% |
| 9 | June 24, 2013 | 0.263% |
| 10 | June 25, 2013 | 0.211% |
| 11 | July 1, 2013 | 0.129% |
| 12 | July 2, 2013 | 0.239% |
| 13 | July 8, 2013 | 0.160% |
| 14 | July 9, 2013 | 0.314% |
| 15 | July 15, 2013 | 0.246% |
| 16 | July 16, 2013 | 0.241% |
| Average | | 0.261% |

- This drama airs on a cable channel/pay TV which normally has a relatively smaller audience compared to free-to-air TV/public broadcasters (KBS, SBS, MBC and EBS).

== International broadcast ==
| Country | Network | Airing dates |
|---|---|---|
| Thailand | Channel 7 | June 1, 2016 |
| Vietnam | VTV3 | Aug 12, 2014 |
