= I Love That Crazy Little Thing =

- Poster
- Chinese: 那件疯狂的小事叫爱情
- Directed by: Snow Zou
- Starring: William Chan; Tang Yixin; Jessica Jung; Nicholas Tse
- Production companies: Yinghuang (Beijing) Media; Wanda Media; Emperor Motion Pictures
- Distributed by: EMP Distribution (Beijing); Wanda Shengshi Film Distribution
- Release date: 12 August 2016
- Country: China
- Language: Mandarin
- Box office: CN¥36.5 million

I Love That Crazy Little Thing is a 2016 Chinese romantic comedy film directed by Snow Zou and starring William Chan, Tang Yixin and Jessica Jung. It was released in China by EMP Distribution (Beijing) and Wanda Shengshi Film Distribution on 12 August 2016.

== Plot ==
Jiang Yang (William Chan) is an editor who dreams of becoming a movie director. In efforts to pursue his passion, however, Yang encounters several challenges. These lead him to crazy yet memorable adventures alongside his girlfriend, Qianqian (Jessica Jung).

== Cast ==
- William Chan as Jiang Yang
- Tang Yixin
- Jessica Jung as Qian qian
- Nicholas Tse
- Gillian Chung
- Jack Kao
- Liu Xiaoqian
- Nik Wang
- Rock Ji
- Mike Sui
- Suolang Nima
- Seo In-guk
- He Jiong
- Du Haitao
- Sun Yi

== Reception ==
The film has grossed CN¥34 million at the Chinese box office.

== See also ==
- But Always, another film by the same director
