= Wild Romance (TV series) =

- Promotional poster
- Also known as: Aggressive Romance
- Genre: Romance; Comedy; Sports; Suspense
- Written by: Park Yeon-seon
- Directed by: Bae Kyung-soo; Kim Jin-woo
- Starring: Lee Dong-wook; Lee Si-young; Oh Man-seok; Hwang Sun-hee
- Music by: Kim Seon-min; Kim Gyeong-beom
- Ending theme: What to Do by Jessica Jung (ft.Kim Jin-pyo)
- Country of origin: South Korea
- Original language: Korean
- No. of episodes: 16

Production
- Executive producers: Hwang Eui-kyung; Oh Sung-min
- Producer: Hwang In-hyuk
- Production location: Korea
- Running time: Wednesdays and Thursdays at 21:55 (KST)
- Production company: GNG Production

Original release
- Network: KBS2
- Release: 4 January – 23 February 2012

Wild Romance (Korean: 난폭한 로맨스; RR: Nanpokhan romaenseu) is a 2012 South Korean television series. It aired on KBS2 from January 4 to February 23, 2012 on Wednesdays and Thursdays at 21:55 for 16 episodes. The screwball romantic comedy is about the love-hate relationship between an obnoxious superstar professional baseball player (Lee Dong-wook) and his tomboyish bodyguard (Lee Si-young).

== Plot ==
Brash, arrogant Park Mu-yeol (Lee Dong-wook) is the star player of the pro baseball team Red Dreamers, renowned for both his skill and his bad temper. Stubborn bodyguard-by-trade Yoo Eun-jae (Lee Si-young) hates him; she's a lifelong fan of the Blue Seagulls, the Red Dreamers' rival team. The two mortal enemies are suddenly thrown together by fate.

A chance meeting during a drunken night of karaoke leads to a scuffle, which former judo athlete Eun-jae easily wins, flipping Mu-yeol on his back. The fight was captured on video however and soon erupts into a huge scandal, with Mu-yeol's reputation and Eun-jae's career as a bodyguard at stake. To fix things, their respective employers agree to assign Eun-jae to act as Mu-yeol's bodyguard. The mismatched pair are now around each other round the clock, and in the midst of constant squabbling and working to find each other's weak spots, they find out more about each other than they realized.

== Cast ==
- Lee Dong-wook as Park Mu-yeol
- Lee Si-young as Yoo Eun-jae
- Oh Man-seok as Jin Dong-soo, Mu-yeol's best friend and former teammate
- Hwang Sun-hee as Oh Su-young, Dong-soo's wife
- Jessica Jung as Kang Jong-hee, Mu-yeol's ex-girlfriend
- Kang Dong-ho as Kim Tae-han, PR manager of the Red Dreamers
- Lim Ju-eun as Kim Dong-ah, Eun-jae's best friend and housemate
- Lee Hee-joon as Go Jae-hyo, reporter
- Lee Han-wi as Kevin Jang, Eun-jae's boss
- Lee Won-jong as Yoo Young-gil, Eun-jae's father
- Jang Tae-hoon as Yoo Chang-ho, Eun-jae's younger brother
- Hong Jong-hyun as Seo Yoon-yi
- Lee El as Mi-jin
- Kim Jin-woo as Jin Woo-young
- Lee Bo-hee as Yang Sun-hee, Mu-yeol's maid
- Kim Yun-tae as Mi-jin's partner

== Reception ==
In the same timeslot as hit period drama Moon Embracing the Sun, Wild Romance garnered meager ratings of less than 10 percent. But the series gained a loyal following among TV drama fans. When it first began airing, the series was criticized for erratic editing, excessive sound effects and an implausible storyline, but those criticisms soon subsided as viewers praised writer Park Yeon-seon for her smart and irreverent comedy, tension-filled mystery thriller tropes, insightful lines full of depth, creative use of dialogue and intelligent characterization.

=== Ratings ===
in the tables below blue numbersrepresents lowest rating and red numbers represents highest rating .

Date	Episode	Nationwide	Seoul
2012-01-04	01	7.1% ,	8.8%
2012-01-05	02	6.7%	8.7%
2012-01-11	03	6.2%	7.2%
2012-01-12	04	6.5%	9.1%
2012-01-18	05	5.8%	9.4%
2012-01-19	06	5.3%	8.6%
2012-01-25	07	4.9%	8.5%
2012-01-26	08	5.8%	7.3%
2012-02-01	09	3.9%	8.1%
2012-02-02	10	4.0%	8.0%
2012-02-08	11	6.0%	9.5%
2012-02-09	12	5.9%	9.1%
2012-02-15	13	4.7%	8.8%
2012-02-16	14	4.0%	9.3%
2012-02-22	15	4.7%	7.8%
2012-02-23	16	5.0%	8.2%
Average		5.4%	8.5%

Source: TNmS Media Korea

== International broadcast ==
- It began airing in Japan on TBS on May 7, 2013 as part of the network's "Hallyu Select" programming.
- In Thailand aired on True Asian Series in mid-year 2013.
- In Vietnam aired on VTV3 on September 10, 2013, under the title Chuyện tình nữ vệ sĩ.

== Awards and nominations ==
Year	Award	Category	Recipient	Result
2012	2012 KBS Drama Awards	Excellence Award, Actor in a Miniseries	Lee Dong-wook	Nominated
