= Kim Jin-pyo (musician) =

South Korean entertainer (born 1977)

- 김진표
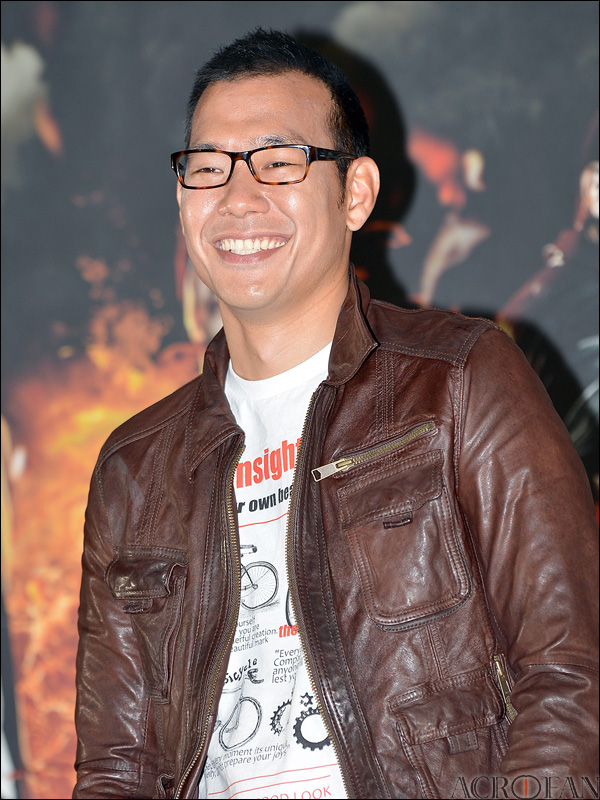
- Kim in 2012
- Born: August 13, 1977 (age 49)
- Occupations: MC; rapper; singer; songwriter; television presenter; race car driver
- Years active: 1995–present
- Spouse: Yoon Joo-ryeon (m. 2008)
- Children: 1
- Musical career
- Genre: Hip hop
- Label: Neowiz Bugs

Kim Jin-pyo (Korean: 김진표; born August 13, 1977) is a South Korean MC, rapper, singer, songwriter, television presenter and professional race car driver. He began his career in 1995 as one half of the duo Panic, together with his childhood friend Lee Juck, and went on to release music both as a solo artist and as a member of the rock group Nova Sonic. In 2003, he won the Mnet Music Video Festival award for Best Hip Hop Performance. He is currently the host of Top Gear Korea and of Show Me the Money.

Kim is married to actress Yoon Joo-ryeon (ko) and they have a daughter. He appeared with their daughter in the reality show Dad! Where Are We Going?.

== Discography ==
=== Studio albums ===
- 1998: Exception (列外)
- 1998: JP Style
- 2001: JP 3
- 2003: JP 4
- 2004: Best - Remastering All about JP
- 2008: Galanty Show
- 2012: JP 6
- 2013: JP 7

=== Mini albums ===
- 2009: Romantic Winter (Romantic 겨울)
- 2013: 5 Break-Up Stories

=== Collaborations ===
- "쿨하게 헤어지는 방법", with 잔디, Blue Brand 1st 12 Doors, 2009
- "아무 말도 하지마", with K.Will, Blue Brand 2nd Trauma, 2010
- "어쩜", with Jessica Jung, Wild Romance OST, 2012
- "아저씨", with J Rabbit, Single, 2012

== Awards ==
Year	Award	Category	Nominated work	Result	Ref.
2003	Mnet Music Video Festival	Best Hip Hop Performance	"With a Dogged Spirit"	Won	
