= With Love, J =

EP by Jessica
- Released: May 16, 2016
- Recorded: September 2015 – March 2016
- Genre: Pop; dance; R&B
- Length: 21:22
- Language: Korean; English
- Label: Coridel

Jessica chronology
With Love, J (2016)	Wonderland (2016)

Singles from With Love, J
- 1. "Fly" Released: May 16, 2016; 2. "Love Me the Same" Released: May 18, 2016

With Love, J is the debut extended play by American and South Korean singer Jessica. The Korean-language edition consisting of six songs was released worldwide by Coridel Entertainment on May 16, 2016, while an English-language version featuring five songs (with the exclusion of "Dear Diary") was released on May 27, 2016. The EP was Jessica's first music release following her departure from South Korean girl group Girls' Generation in September 2014. The songs "Fly" and "Love Me the Same" were released as the album's singles on May 16 and 18, 2016, respectively.

== Background and release ==
Jessica originally signed with SM Entertainment in 2000. In 2007, she was chosen as a member of the group Girls' Generation. On September 30, 2014, Jessica announced on her personal Weibo account that she was "forced out" of the group, which was later confirmed by the record label itself. Jessica's final song with Girls' Generation is "Divine", which was released as a part of the repackaged version of their first Japanese greatest hits album, The Best. On August 6, 2015, S.M. Entertainment released an official statement stating that Jessica had officially parted ways with the company.

In February 2016, Jessica announced that her first solo album would be released under her new agency, Coridel Entertainment. In April 2016, representatives announced that Jung would release her first album the following month in May. On April 30, Coridel Entertainment released the track list which included the title track "Fly" featuring American rapper Fabolous. Jung wrote and composed four out of the six tracks. The name of the extended play/mini album was revealed to be With Love, J.

== Promotion ==
The music video for the debut single, "Fly," was released on May 17, 2016. The music video for "Fly" amassed over 2 million views within 24 hours of its release. A video for the second single, "Love Me The Same," was released the following day on May 18, 2016.

The album was made available for pre-ordering by Coridel Entertainment via various online music services. The first 60,000 copies of the album had been sold out one day prior to the release date on May 16, 2016, leading the label to produce additional copies.

== Reception ==
Chester Chin from The Star rated the album 6/10. The Straits Times rated the album 2.5/5.

== Track listing ==
No.	Title	Lyrics	Music	Arrangement	Length
1.	"Fly" (featuring Fabolous)	Jessica Jung	Jessica Jung; Karriem Mack; Eric Fernandez; Tatiana Matthews; John Jackson	Karriem Mack; Eric Fernandez; Jay Kim	4:12
2.	"Big Mini World"	Kim Eun-soo; Jay Kim	T-SK; Jasmine Anderson; BIG-F	T-SK	3:11
3.	"Falling Crazy in Love"	Jessica Jung	Henrik Nordenback; Christian Fast; Lisa Demond	Henrik Nordenback	4:01
4.	"Love Me the Same"	Jessica Jung	Jessica Jung; Eric Fernandez; Karriem Mack; Julien Cross	Karriem Mack; Eric Fernandez; Jay Kim	3:24
5.	"Golden Sky"	Jessica Jung	Jessica Jung; Karriem Mack; Tatiana Matthews; Liana Banks	Karriem Mack; Jay Kim	3:15
6.	"Dear Diary"	Jay Kim; D.EAR; Joo Dong-jun	D.EAR	D.EAR	3:19
Total length:					21:22

Note: The English version of the EP does not feature track 6 "Dear Diary".

== Charts ==
Chart (2016)	Peak position
Japanese Albums (Oricon)	34
South Korean Albums (Gaon)	1
US Heatseekers Albums (Billboard)	16
US World Albums (Billboard)	4

=== Monthly charts ===
Chart (2016)	Peak position
South Korean Albums (Gaon)	3

=== Year-end chart ===
Chart (2016)	Position
South Korea (Gaon)	33

== Release history ==
Region	Date	Edition	Format	Label
South Korea	May 17, 2016	Korean-language edition	CD, digital download	Coridel Entertainment, Interpark INT
Various	May 17, 2016	Korean-language edition	Digital download	Coridel Entertainment, Interpark INT
Various	May 27, 2016	English-language edition	Digital download	Coridel Entertainment
