= My Decade =

EP by Jessica
- Released: August 9, 2017
- Recorded: 2017
- Genre: K-pop
- Length: 21:27
- Language: Korean
- Label: Coridel; Interpark

Jessica chronology
Wonderland (2016)	My Decade (2017)	Beep Beep (2023)

Singles from My Decade
- 1. "Because It's Spring" Released: April 18, 2017; 2. "Summer Storm" Released: August 9, 2017; 3. "Starry Night" Released: September 1, 2017

Music video
- "Summer Storm" on YouTube

My Decade is the third extended play by American and South Korean singer Jessica Jung. It was released on August 9, 2017, by Coridel Entertainment and Interpark.

Meant to celebrate her 10th anniversary of debut as a singer, the EP contains 6 songs, including the previously released single "Because It's Spring" and the title track "Summer Storm", as well as the final single "Starry Night". Unlike Jung's previous EPs, My Decade does not have an English version.

== Promotion ==
=== Singles ===
"It's Spring" was released as a digital single on April 18, 2017, with an accompanying music video that features the singer in different sets as a type of behind the scenes.

"Summer Storm" was released as the title track in conjunction with the EP on August 9 with an accompanying music video.

"Starry Night" was released as the final single on September 1 with an accompanying lyric video that features the singer in different sets as a type of behind the scenes of the music video of the title track “Summer Storm”.

== Commercial performance ==
My Decade debuted and peaked at number 4 on the Gaon Album Chart, on the chart issue dated August 6–12, 2017. In its second week, the EP fell to number 9, and after a week off the chart, re-entered in its fourth week at number 10. The EP also debuted and peaked at number 5 on US World Albums, in the week ending August 26, 2017.

The EP placed at number 9 on the Gaon Album Chart for the month of August 2017, with 44,684 physical copies sold.

== Track listing ==
Digital and CD
No.	Title	Lyrics	Music	Producer(s)	Length
1.	"Summer Storm"	Jessica	KAIROS; SWISH	KAIROS; SWISH; WES KOZ; K.O; Jay Kim	3:22
2.	"Beautiful Mind"	Jessica	Jessica Jung; Vekz; Tatu; Matthews; Kmack	Vekz; Jay Kim	3:39
3.	"Saturday Night"	Jessica	KAIROS; JESPER BORDEN	KAIROS; WES KOZ; JESPER BORDEN; Jay Kim	3:05
4.	"Love U"	D.EAR	D.EAR	D.EAR	3:26
5.	"Starry Night"	Jessica	Henrik Nordenback; Christian Fast; Lisa Desmond	Henrik Nordenback	4:26
6.	"Because It's Spring" (봄이라서 그래)	Jay Kim; Jessica	Seo Jung-Jin; KEEPROOTS; Fascinating; Hwang Joon-Ik	Seo Jung-Jin; KEEPROOTS; Fascinating	3:29
Total length:					21:27

== Charts ==
Chart (2017)	Peak position
South Korea (Gaon)	4
US World Albums (Billboard)	5

== Release history ==
Region	Date	Format	Language	Distributor
Worldwide	August 9, 2017	Digital download	Korean	Coridel Entertainment, Interpark Music
South Korea	August 9, 2017	CD	Korean	Coridel Entertainment, Interpark Music
