= Typhoon Khanun (2017) =

Pacific typhoon in 2017

Typhoon Khanun (Odette)
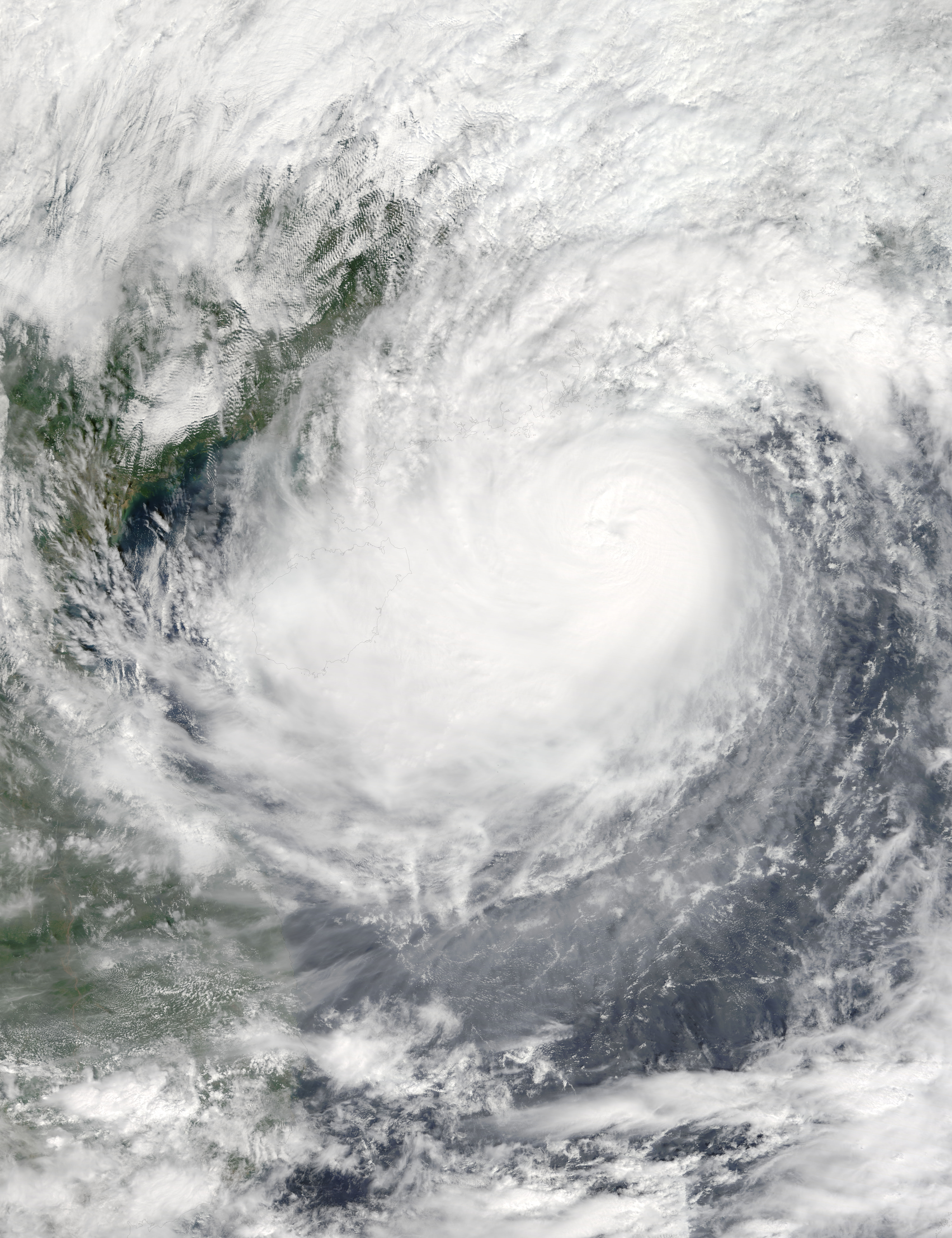
- Khanun near peak intensity approaching the Leizhou Peninsula on October 15

Meteorological history
- Formed: October 11, 2017
- Dissipated: October 16, 2017

Typhoon
- 10-minute sustained (JMA)
- Highest winds: 140 km/h (85 mph)
- Lowest pressure: 955 hPa (mbar); 28.20 inHg

Category 2-equivalent typhoon
- 1-minute sustained (SSHWS/JTWC)
- Highest winds: 165 km/h (105 mph)
- Lowest pressure: 965 hPa (mbar); 28.50 inHg

Overall effects
- Fatalities: 2
- Injuries: 1
- Missing: 1
- Damage: $5.55 million (2017 USD)
- Areas affected: Luzon; South China; Taiwan
- IBTrACS
- Part of the 2017 Pacific typhoon season

Typhoon Khanun, (Note: The name Khanun (Thai: ขนุน, [kʰa˨˩ nun˩˩˦]) was contributed by Thailand and means jackfruit (Artocarpus heterophyllus) in Thai.) known in the Philippines as Severe Tropical Storm Odette, was a strong tropical cyclone which impacted the Philippines, Taiwan and South China in mid-October 2017. The twentieth named storm and eighth typhoon of the 2017 Pacific typhoon season, the system formed as a tropical depression east of Luzon on October 11. The depression tracked westward and became Tropical Storm Khanun the next day.

It struck Luzon later that day and emerged into the South China Sea on October 13. Khanun turned west-southwest and decelerated, then turned northwest as it intensified to a severe tropical storm later that day. It strengthened to a typhoon on October 14. The storm rapidly weakened late on October 15 before striking the Leizhou Peninsula. Khanun emerged into the Gulf of Tonkin on October 16 and dissipated shortly afterwards.

== Meteorological history ==
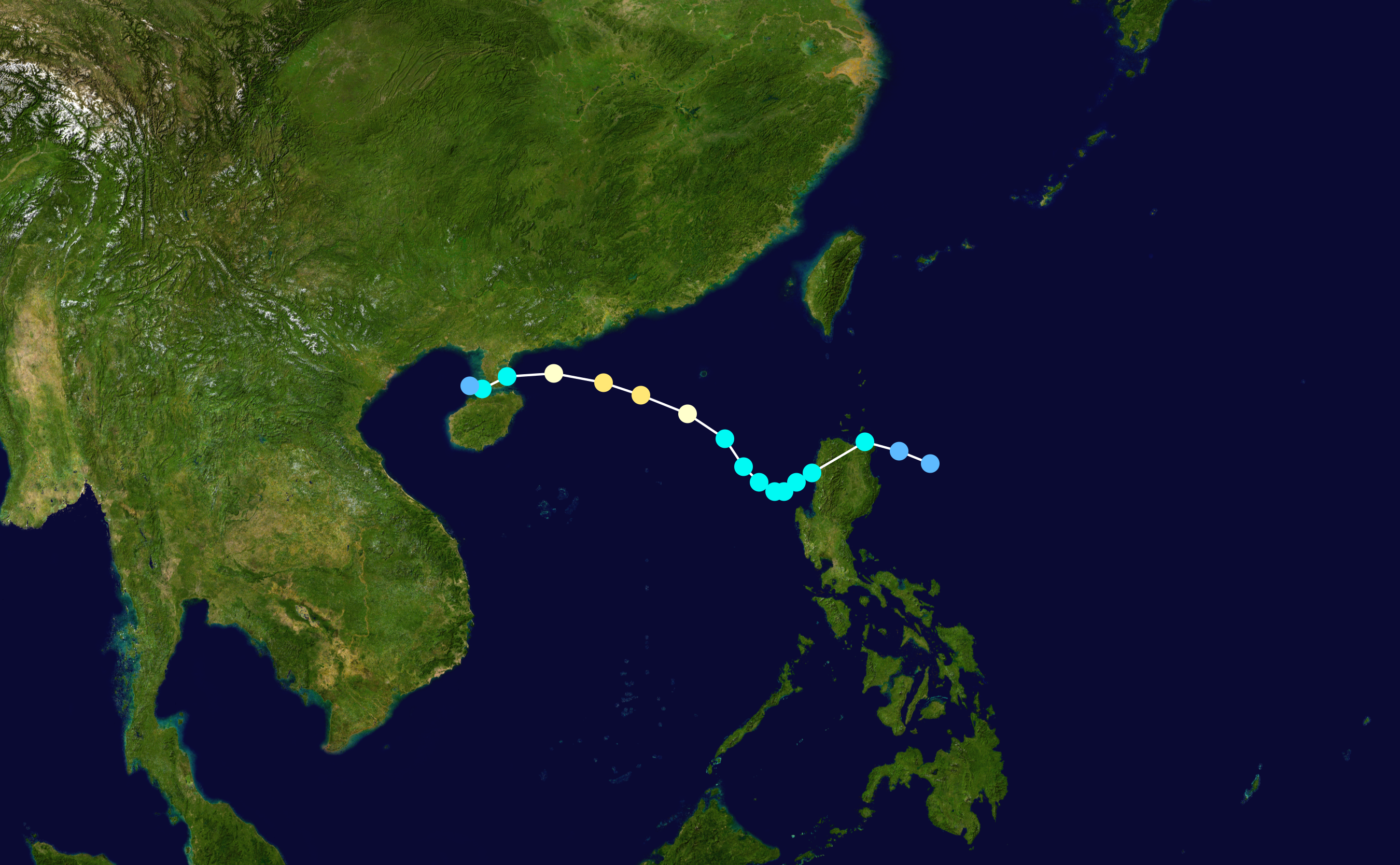
Map plotting the storm's track and intensity, according to the Saffir–Simpson scale Map key Saffir–Simpson scale Tropical depression (≤38 mph, ≤62 km/h) Tropical storm (39–73 mph, 63–118 km/h) Category 1 (74–95 mph, 119–153 km/h) Category 2 (96–110 mph, 154–177 km/h) Category 3 (111–129 mph, 178–208 km/h) Category 4 (130–156 mph, 209–251 km/h) Category 5 (≥157 mph, ≥252 km/h) Unknown Storm type Tropical cyclone Subtropical cyclone Extratropical cyclone, remnant low, tropical disturbance, or monsoon depression

On October 11, the Japan Meteorological Agency (JMA) noted a tropical depression formed about 770 mi (1,240 km) east of Luzon. The Philippine Atmospheric, Geophysical and Astronomical Services Administration (PAGASA) classified the system as a tropical depression and assigned the local name Odette. The depression tracked west-northwest along the southern edge of a subtropical ridge. The Joint Typhoon Warning Centre (JTWC) classified the system as a tropical depression on the next day and tagged it as 24W. Under favorable condition including warm sea surface temperatures of 29–30 °C (84–86 °F), low wind shear, good poleward outflow and high ocean heat content (OHC), both JMA and JTWC upgraded the system to a tropical storm, while the former agency assigned the name Khanun. Turning west-southwest, Khanun made landfall in Santa Ana, Cagayan at 12:40 a.m. PST October 13 (16:40 UTC October 12), as a minimal tropical storm. Despite traversing overland, Khanun didn't weaken much and emerged into the South China Sea on October 13.

Khanun slowed down after emerging into the South China Sea as it approached the weakness of the ridge. Despite marginal environment with waters of 29–30 °C (84–86 °F), moderate wind shear and weak outflow, Khanun strengthened to a severe tropical storm late on October 13. Khanun turned northwestward on October 14 along the southwestern edge of the ridge. As outflow improved, a ragged eye-like feature appeared on satellite imagery. Later that day, the JMA upgraded Khanun to a typhoon, while the JTWC upgraded it to a Category 1–equivalent typhoon as an eye appeared in both satellite and microwave imaging. The PAGASA ceased issuing advisory on Khanun as it left the Philippine Area of Responsibility (PAR). At 00:00 UTC on October 15, Khanun attained peak intensity with 10-minute sustained winds of 85 mph (140 km/h) according to JMA, while the JTWC estimated its peak 1-minute sustained winds of 105 mph (165 km/h) nine hours later. Khanun then turned west-northwest along the southwestern edge of the ridge. Shortly afterwards, increasing wind shear and land interaction caused Khanun to weaken quickly. Khanun weakened below typhoon status just a few hours after attaining peak intensity. At 3:25 a.m. CST October 16 (19:25 UTC October 15), Khanun made landfall in Xuwen County, Zhanjiang, Guangdong as a weakening tropical storm. Early on October 16, Khanun weakened to a tropical depression due to strong wind shear, showing completely exposed center on satellite imagery. The JMA ceased monitoring the system and the JTWC issued its final advisory on Khanun while it was located over the eastern Gulf of Tonkin.

== Preparations and impact ==
=== Philippines ===
Shortly after being classified as a tropical depression, the PAGASA issued TCWS #1 for provinces in Cagayan Valley and Cordillera Administrative Region. The PAGASA issued TCWS #2 for Batanes, Cagayan (including Babuyan Islands), Apayao, and Ilocos Norte on October 12 as Khanun strengthened to a tropical storm. As Khanun left the Philippines, the TCWS were gradually lifted, and all warnings were cancelled on October 14. In advance of the storm, 6 flights from the Philippine Airlines and Cebu Pacific were cancelled on October 12. 17 people were stranded in Aparri and Basco due to Khanun. School classes in various provinces of northern Luzon were suspended. Khanun left two dead, one injured and one missing in the Philippines. In Abra de Ilog, a 47-year-old man drowned while he was fishing, while in Pudtol, Apayao, a 68-year-old man drowned while crossing a bridge. A few municipalities in northern Luzon experienced power outage. The storm destroyed two houses and damaged seven others. In all, Khanun affected 6,392 people, in which 139 of them were moved into evacuation centers. Damage from the storm reached ₱284 million (US$5.55 million), most of which was agricultural damage.

== See also ==
- Weather of 2017
- Tropical cyclones in 2017
- Tropical Storm Rumbia (2013)
- Typhoon Rammasun (2014)
- Typhoon Kalmaegi (2014)
- Typhoon Mujigae (2015)
- Typhoon Sarika (2016)
- Typhoon Mangkhut (2018)
- Tropical Storm Nangka (2020)
- Tropical Storm Talim (2023)
- Typhoon Yagi (2024)
- Typhoon Matmo (2025)
