= Coridel Entertainment =

South Korean entertainment company

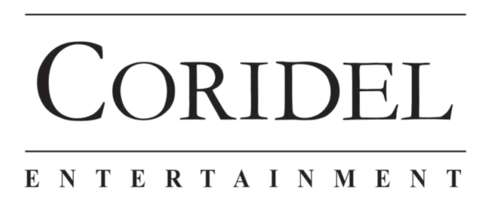
- Company type: Private
- Industry: Entertainment
- Genre: K-pop
- Founded: 2015
- Founder: Tyler Kwon (CEO)
- Headquarters: Seoul, South Korea
- Area served: Worldwide
- Parent: Coridel Group LLC
- Subsidiaries: Clear Company Co., Ltd.
- Website: coridelent.com

Coridel Entertainment is a South Korean entertainment company established in 2015 by Tyler Kwon.

== History ==
Coridel Entertainment was founded in 2015 by Tyler Kwon as a subsidiary of the Coridel Group, based in New York City, United States. It merged the same year with a record label called Clear Company, which managed the K-pop girl group Playback and Jeff Bernat's Korean concerts and releases.

On February 28, 2016, Jessica Jung signed with Coridel Entertainment following her split from Girls' Generation in 2014 and departure from her former agency SM Entertainment in 2015. On May 17, 2016, she released her solo debut album under the label titled With Love, J, with the lead single "Fly". On December 10, 2016 she released her second solo album under the label titled Wonderland, with her lead single "Wonderland".

Actor Ryu Tae-joon signed with Coridel Entertainment in April 2017, and singer Kevin Woo in September 2018.

== Artists ==
=== Soloists ===
- Jessica
- Ma Eun-jin
- Jeff Bernat

=== Actor ===
- Ryu Tae-joon
- Yun Bok In
- Kim Young Pil
- Lee Kwan Hun
- Jang Joon Woong
- Cheong Ha Eun
- Lee Hayoung

== Former artists ==
- Kevin Woo
- Playback (2015–2017)

== Discography ==
Artist	Title	Date	Format	Language	Distribution
Jeff Bernat	In the Meantime	January 16, 2016	Studio album	English	CJ E&M Music
Jessica	With Love, J	May 17, 2016	Extended play	Korean, English	Interpark Music
Jessica	Wonderland	December 10, 2016	Extended play	Korean, English	Interpark Music
Jessica	Because It's Spring	April 18, 2017	Digital single	Korean	Interpark Music
Jeff Bernat	Afterwords	May 24, 2017	Studio album	English	CJ E&M Music
Jeff Bernat	Da Ra Da	June 4, 2017	Digital single	English	CJ E&M Music
Ma Eun-jin	I Understand	June 9, 2017	Digital single	Korean	LOEN Entertainment
Jessica	My Decade	August 9, 2017	Extended play	Korean	Interpark Music
Playback	Untold Story	October 20, 2017	Digital single	Korean	LOEN Entertainment
Playback	Want You to Say	October 27, 2017	Digital single	Korean	LOEN Entertainment
Jessica	Beep Beep	November 22, 2023	Extended play	English, Korean	Warner Music Group
