= The One Like You =

- Digital cover

Promotional single by Jessica

from the album Dating Agency: Cyrano soundtrack
- Released: July 2, 2013
- Recorded: SM Studios, Seoul
- Length: 4:15
- Label: CJ E&M
- Songwriters: Kim Ji-hyang, Melodesign

Music video
- "The One Like You" on YouTube

"The One Like You" (Korean: 그대라는 한 사람; also translated as "That One Person Is You") is a ballad song performed by American and South Korean singer Jessica Jung.
The song was released as a digital single on July 2, 2013, and was the fourth soundtrack single album to be unveiled for the TV drama series tvN's Dating Agency: Cyrano starring then fellow Girls' Generation member Choi Sooyoung.

== Production ==
The song was composed and arranged by Melodesign (Kim Doo-hyun), widely known for working on various songs of the artists under Jellyfish Entertainment including Seo In-guk's "With Laughter or with Tears". The lyrics were penned by Kim Ji-hyang, known for working on the lyrics of U-Kiss's "Take Me Away".

== Chart performance ==
Chart	Peak position
Gaon Weekly singles	37
K-Pop Billboard Weekly singles	21
