= Lee Hong-gi =

South Korean singer and actor (born 1990)

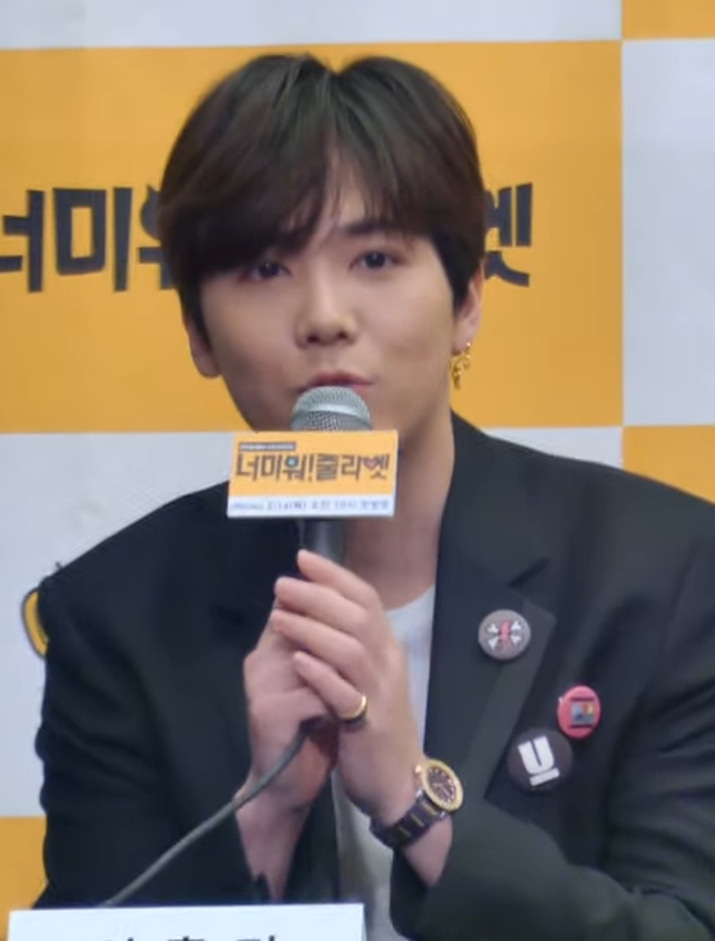
- Lee in 2019
- Born: March 2, 1990 (age 36); Bundang District, Seongnam, South Korea
- Other name: Lee Hong-ki
- Education: Kyung Hee University
- Occupations: Singer; television personality; actor
- Years active: 2002–present
- Musical career
- Genres: Rock; pop
- Instrument: Vocals
- Years active: 2007–present
- Labels: FNC; AI; Warner Japan
- Member of: F.T. Island
- Website: fncent.com/leehonggi

Korean name
- Hangul: 이홍기
- Hanja: 李洪基
- RR: I Honggi
- MR: I Honggi

Lee Hong-gi (Korean: 이홍기; born March 2, 1990), also known mononymously as Hongki, is a South Korean singer, actor, and media personality. He is best known as the front man of rock band F.T. Island. In 2015, Lee debuted as a solo artist with the releases of his first Korean extended play FM302 and his first Japanese album, AM302. As an actor, Lee started his career by starring in children drama Magic Kid Masuri (2002). He later successfully transitioned to adult role and participated in various television dramas, notably You're Beautiful (2009) and A Korean Odyssey (2017). He started a YouTube career by launching personal channel Honggi Jonggi in April 2022.

== Acting career ==
Before Lee Hong-gi debuted as a singer with the band F.T. Island, he was a child actor, making his acting debut in 2002 with KBS2 TV series Magic Kid Masuri as Masuri's friend Kim Ji-hoon. This children drama gained popularity among elementary school students during its run. He was also featured in EBS children drama Kkangsooni, where he played the character of Eo Soo-bong, and sang for the drama's OST.

In 2008, he was offered the lead role in Master of Study, the Korean adaptation of Japanese drama Dragon Zakura. Master of Study should have aired in the beginning of 2009 but due to preproduction difficulties, the drama was postponed to the beginning of 2010 which led FNC Entertainment to refuse Lee's role because of his busy schedule with the band.

Lee then played Lysander in a Korean musical theatre version of A Midsummer Night's Dream, where he showcased his singing, acting and dancing skills. In 2009, after a five-year break, he made his acting comeback and took the role of the quirky but loveable drummer Jeremy in You're Beautiful. To promote the drama, he also contributed solo tracks to the OST, such as "Promise" and "Still/As Ever." He received a New Star Award at the 2009 SBS Drama Awards for his performance. You're Beautiful recorded modest ratings in South Korea, but it became an international success and with it, Lee's worldwide popularity increased.

In April 2011, Lee starred in the TBS Japanese drama Muscle Girl! opposite Yui Ichikawa. This was followed by a 90-minute Korean-Japanese co-production titled Noriko Goes to Seoul, in which he played a young aspiring singer who meets an older woman (Takashima Reiko) who inspires him through hardships to achieve his dream.

In June 2013, he made his big screen debut in the movie Rockin' on Heaven's Door (Korean title: Passionate Goodbye), with Baek Jin-hee, in which Lee portrayed as a rebellious music star who is sent to work in a hospice.

Lee began filming Bride of the Century with Yang Jin-sung. He went on a four-week rest after he dislocated his shoulder and suffered facial fractures during December 2013. He resumed shooting in January 2014, and the drama aired that February.

Lee also starred in SBS Modern Farmer alongside Park Min-woo, Lee Ha-nui, and others. The drama aired from October 18, 2014, to December 21, 2014, at 20:40 on Saturdays and Sundays.

Lee Hong-gi was cast in the musical Sugar, an adaptation of the 1959 film Some Like It Hot. He plays Joe (Josephine), a saxophonist who disguises himself as a woman after witnessing a gang murder. The show runs at the KEPCO Art Center Grand Theater in Seoul from December 12, 2025, to February 22, 2026.

== Music career ==
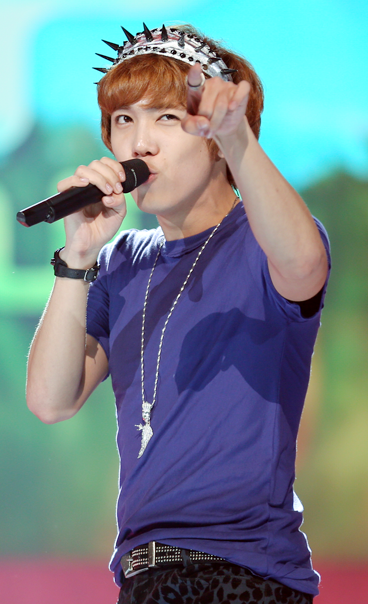
Lee in 2012

=== F.T. Island ===
In 2007, Lee debuted in the band F.T. Island as the lead singer. He can also rap and beatbox.

Lee decided to pursue a career in singing after he starred in Kkangsooni, for which he sang a song for the soundtrack. At the end of the drama, he performed the song live on stage. He was 13 years old at that time. Impressed by his powerful vocal ability, a few music agents approached him, not wishing to waste his talent for singing. Then-fledgling label company FNC Music signed Lee and fully trained him to become the lead singer of F.T. Island.

=== Solo debut ===
In 2015, Lee announced through social media that he was working on both a Korean and Japanese album, which was released in November and December respectively. The mini Korean album was revealed to be FM302, and the album was released on November 18, 2015, while the Japanese album was revealed to be AM302, and it was released on December 9, 2015. 'FM302' combines the radio terminology frequency modulation (FM) with Lee's birthday which is on March 2, to create the effect of his own radio frequency that resonates his music across the world. The title song "Insensible" is a ballad track and it tells the sad story of a man who is unable to forget his previous love. The music video was published on November 18, 2015. The lead actress of the music video is actress Park Shin-hye. Prior to his official music video release, a showcase was organized. Upon the release of FM302, it topped both Naver's real-time search chart, as well as Hanteo sales chart. The album still retained its position next week, selling more than 19,000 albums within two weeks. Moreover, six days after the release of the album, Lee won first place on SBS MTV's The Show for the first time. The album charted at No. 2 on Gaon Chart's national physical albums ranking, as well as No. 5 on the Gaon Social Chart in the 3rd week of November.

On the other hand, the music video for the lead single of the Japanese album AM302, "モノローグ (Monologue)", was published on November 11, 2015, on F.T. Island's Official Japanese YouTube channel. The Japanese album contained some tracks from the Korean album FM302, but was translated into Japanese. The album is also available in three different sets, namely, the original version, Primadonna version (for fans), and the limited edition DVD version. Upon release, it charted at #4 in the Oricon charts.

=== Soundtrack appearances ===
Lee has sung many OSTs for different dramas such as You're Beautiful, Heartstrings and The Heirs.

On May 21, 2015, Dal Shabet's official YouTube channel uploaded a video titled "Joker" in Rock Version. The video was a collaboration with Lee and Subin singing Joker in rock version. It was believed that the two decided on a collaboration when Lee and Subin met on Hello Counselor.

=== Compositions and lyric-writing ===
In recent years, Lee has also begun composing music, contributing the songs "Black Chocolate" and "Orange Sky" to F.T. Island's Japanese album Rated FT, as well as the title track "Memory" and the song "Always With You" on F.T. Island's Korean mini-album Thanks To, "Siren" from their album The Mood and title song "Wind" from their album Over 10 Years . He also composed Japanese songs "On My Way", "Just Please" and "Born to be a Rock n Roller".

== Personal life ==
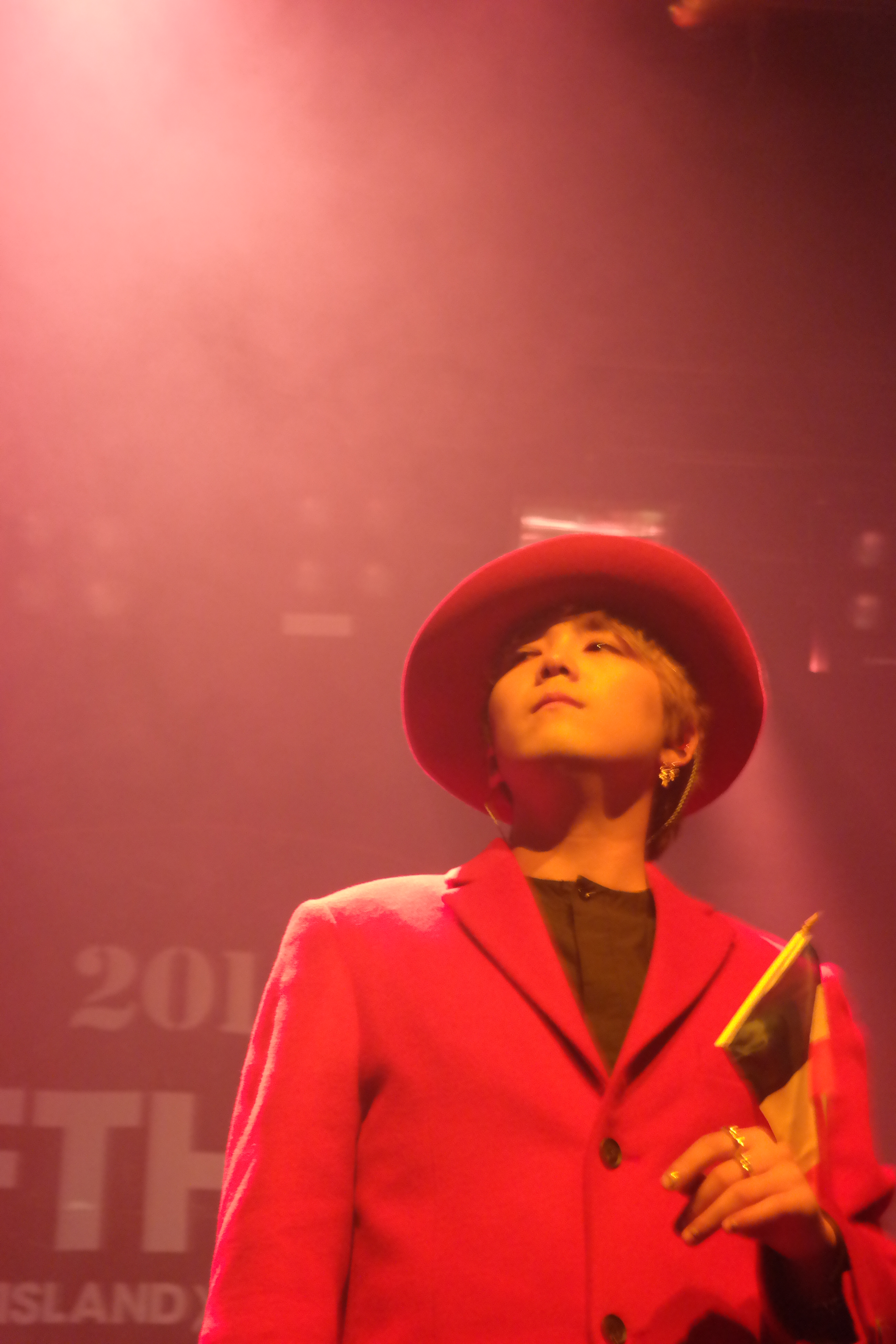
Lee Hong-gi in Paris in 2015 at La Cigale

Lee was enrolled in Kyunghee University studying theatre and film.

Lee started his own fashion brand 'Skullhong' in June 2014. He designs accessories, jewelry and various nail products. It was originally based in Seoul, but has since expanded its business to Hong Kong, and Tokyo, Japan.

On September 30, 2019, Lee began his mandatory military service, becoming the first F.T. Island member to enlist. Lee was discharged on April 18, 2021.

== Philanthropy ==
In August 2012, Lee, Jung Yong-hwa, and Park Shin-hye served as surprise guests at a fundraising event called 'Hopes, Dreams, Happy Trip to Korea' organized by the non-profit organization 'Good Friends Save Children' (GFSC). They met with 80 victims of the 2011 Tōhoku earthquake and tsunami, who were students and staff from Ogatsu Middle School in Ishinomaki, Miyagi Prefecture. They provided gifts and offered words of encouragement.

== Discography ==
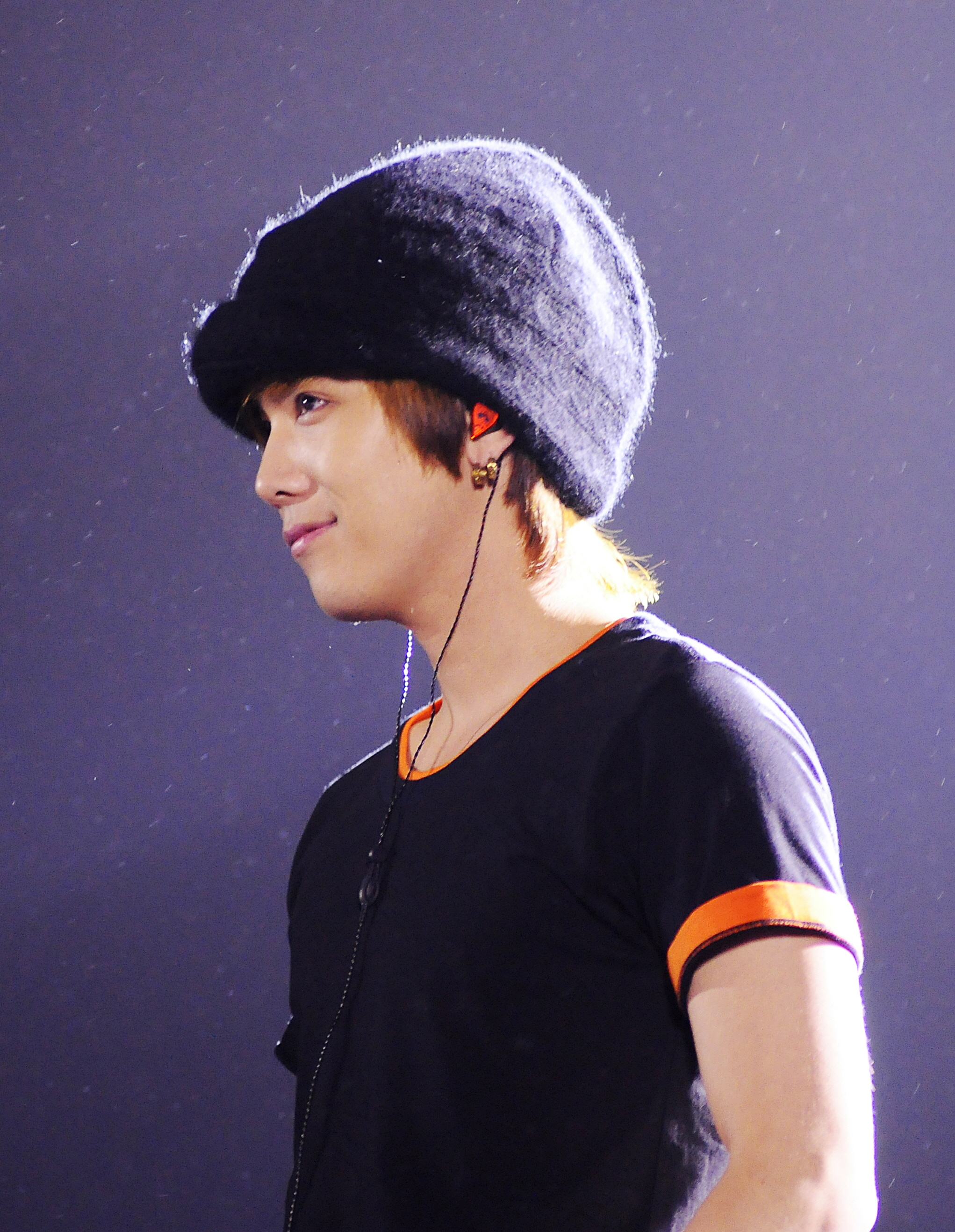
Lee at the Music Core Concert in Hanoi, Vietnam, in November 2012

=== Studio albums ===
Title	Album details	Peak chart positions	Sales
Title	Album details	JPN	Sales
AM302	Released: December 9, 2015 (JPN); Label: Warner Music Japan; Formats: CD, download, streaming	6	JPN: 25,444
Cheers	Released: December 5, 2018 (JPN); Label: Warner Music Japan; Formats: CD, download, streaming	10	JPN: 13,585

=== Extended plays ===
Title	Album details	Peak chart positions		Sales
Title	Album details	JPN	KOR	Sales
FM302	Released: November 18, 2015 (KOR); Label: FNC Entertainment; Formats: CD, download, streaming	—	2	KOR: 36,925
Do N Do	Released: October 18, 2018 (KOR); Label: FNC Entertainment; Formats: CD, download, streaming	38	2	JPN: 2,056; KOR: 17,516
Drawing	Released: September 22, 2021 (JPN); Label: Warner Music Japan; Formats: CD, download, streaming	11	—	JPN: 6,633
"—" denotes release did not chart.

=== Singles ===
Title	Year	Peak chart positions	Album
Title	Year	KOR	Album
"Insensible" (눈치 없이)	2015	29	FM302
"Still Love You" (사랑했었다) (with Yoo Hwe-seung)	2018	—	Non-album single
"I Am" (with Cheetah)	2018	—	Do N Do
"Cookies" (feat. Jung Il-hoon)	2018	—	Do N Do
"Can I Love Again" (다시 사랑할 수 있을까) (with Baek Ji-young)	2021	39	Non-album single
"Only One Person (2023)" (한사람만 (2023)) (original by F.T. Island)	2023	47	Non-album single
"Heejae" (희재) (original by Sung Si-kyung)	2023	90	Non-album single
"Delete (삭제) (original by Lee Seung-gi)	2023	140	Non-album single
"You, Clouds, Rain" (비도 오고 그래서) (original by Heize)	2023	—	Non-album single
"—" denotes release did not chart.

=== Soundtrack appearances ===
Title	Year	Album
"Lately I" (요즘 나는) (with Nam Gyu-ri)	2007	Unstoppable Marriage OST
"Still" (여전히)	2009	You're Beautiful OST
"Jump"	2013	Rockin' on Heaven's Door OST
"Goodbye"	2013	Rockin' on Heaven's Door OST
"Two of Us" (with Mina Fujii)	2013	We Got Married Global Edition OST
"I'm Saying" (말이야)	2013	The Heirs OST
"What I Wanted to Say" (아직 하지 못한 말)	2014	Bride of the Century OST
"When Love Comes" (사랑이 올 때)	2014	Modern Farmer OST
"Do Or Die"	2014	Modern Farmer OST
"Raise Me Up"	2018	Switch OST
"El's Word"	2021	Elsword OST

== Filmography ==
=== Television series ===
Year	Title	Role	Notes	Ref.
2002–2004	Magic Kid Masuri	Kim Ji-hoon	recurring cast	
2003	TV Tale: Bicycle Thief	Park Min-woo	main cast	
2003	TV Tale: Devil's Temptation	Kim Young-ho	lead role	
2003	TV Tale: Beautiful May	Sa Hong-jun	lead role	
2004	There's Light at the Tip of My Fingernails	Han Joo-min/ Han Joo-myung	lead role	
2004	Kkangsooni	Eo Soo-bong	main cast	
2004	Freezing Point	Choi Hwan	supporting role	
2005	Flower Butterfly and Sunflower	Min-woo		
2005	Winter Child			
2006	Happy Time After School- Master of Hanja Dororong	Dororong's brother	educational skit	
2008	Unstoppable Marriage	Hwang Sa-baek's friend	cameo, ep. 62	
2008	On Air	himself	cameo, ep. 1	
2009	Style	himself	cameo, ep. 6	
2009	You're Beautiful	Jeremy	main cast	
2010	More Charming By the Day	chicken delivery guy	cameo, ep. 111	
2010	My Girlfriend Is a Gumiho	Jeremy	cameo, ep. 16	
2011	Muscle Girl!	Yoo Ji-ho	lead role / Japanese drama	
2011	Noriko Goes to Seoul	Kim Min-ha	lead role	
2013	Cheongdam-dong 111	himself	reality show	
2014	Bride of the Century	Choi Kang-joo	lead role	
2014	Modern Farmer	Lee Min-ki	lead role	
2015	Coming Out FTISLAND	himself	reality show (with F.T. Island members)	
2017	A Korean Odyssey	P.K	main cast	
2019	I Hate You, Juliet	Cha Yool	lead role	
2019	Melting Me Softly	Son Hyeon-gi (young)	cameo	

=== Film ===
Year	Title	Role	Notes
2001	Harry Potter and the Philosopher's Stone	Draco Malfoy	Korean dub
2013	Rockin' on Heaven's Door	Choong-ui	lead role
2014	How to Steal a Dog	Seok-gu	supporting role

=== Variety show ===
Year	Title	Notes	Ref.
2001	Love On The Air	reenactment scene actor	
2007	Happiness in 10,000 Won	cast member	
2008	Good Daddy	cast member	
2009	Inkigayo	regular MC	
2009	Scandal	cast member	
2010	Oh! My School	cast member (ep.1-12)	
2011	Immortal Songs: Singing the Legend	regular performer (ep.4-7)	
2011	Saddle The Wind	cast member (ep.3-9)	
2012	MCountdown	regular MC	
2013	We Got Married Global Edition	cast member (with Fujii Mina)	
2015	A Look At Myself	cast member (ep.1-6)	
2015	King of Mask Singer	contestant as "Blow Hot and Cold Bat Human" (ep.3)	
2017	King of Mask Singer	contestant as "Lupin the Phantom Thief" (ep.105–106)	
2017	The Life Academy	cast member	
2017	Night Goblin	cast member (ep.2-32)	
2018	Legendary Bowling	cast member	
2018	Find F.T. Island	cast member	
2018	Road to Ithaca	cast member (ep.2-7)	
2018	Produce 48	vocal trainer	
2019	Produce X 101	MC for "The Beginning" episode	
2019	Playing Oppa	host	
2019	Hackinssa Crew	host	
2021	The Playlist	host	
2021	Chosun Panstar	judge	
2021	Alphabet together	cast member	
2021	LoL The Next 2021	host	
2021	Lee Hong-ki's Playlist Once	host	
2022	Eden, Descendants of Instinct	host	
2022	Chuseok Idol Star Championships	host	
2022	Eden 2	host	
2022	The Idol Band	producer (with F.T. Island)	
2022	Mr. Trot 2	master	
2024	SCOOL	judge	

== Radio show ==
Year	Title	Network	Notes
2016–2018	Lee Honggi Kiss The Radio (Hongkira)	KBS Cool FM	DJ from October 17, 2016, to April 15, 2018

== Musical theatre ==
Year	Title	Role	Ref.
2009	A Midsummer Night's Dream	Lysander	
2014	Vampire	Dracula	
2016	Those Days	Mooyoung	
2019	I Loved You	Yoon Gichul	
2020	Return: The Promise of The Day	Hyunmin	
2021	1976 Harlan County	Daniel	
2021–2022	Jack the Ripper	Daniel	
2022	Mata Hari	Armand	
2023	Harlan County	Daniel	

== Bibliography ==
Year	Title	Notes	Ref.
2013	Lee Hong-gi's Nail Art		
2014	Hongstargram		

== Awards and nominations ==
Year	Award	Category	Nominated work	Result
2009	17th Korean Culture and Entertainment Awards	Top 10 Singers	—N/a	Won
2009	SBS Drama Awards	New Star Award	You're Beautiful	Won
2010	16th Korean Entertainment Arts Awards	Best Male Singer	—N/a	Won
2013	27th Golden Disk Awards	InStyle Fashionista Award	—N/a	Won
2014	9th Seoul International Drama Awards	Outstanding Korean Drama OST	"I'm Saying"	Nominated
2014	16th Seoul International Youth Film Festival	Best OST by a Male Artist	"I'm Saying"	Nominated
