= Roommate (TV program) =

South Korean reality show

- Promotional poster
- Genre: Reality television
- Directed by: Nam Carla
- Starring: Park Bom (2NE1); Jo Se-ho; Hong Soo-hyun; Lee Dong-wook; Nana (After School); Park Min-woo; Seo Kang-joon (5urprise); Heo Young-ji (KARA); Jackson (GOT7); Ryohei Otani; Park Joon-hyung (g.o.d); Shin Sung-woo; Bae Jong-ok; Sunny (Girls' Generation); Lee Guk-joo; Chanyeol (EXO); Song Ga-yeon
- Composer: Yoon Jong-shin
- Country of origin: South Korea
- Original language: Korean
- No. of seasons: 2
- No. of episodes: 46

Production
- Producers: Park Sang-hyuk; Jang Seok-jin; Lee Seung-hoon
- Production location: Seoul
- Running time: Season 1: approx. 80–120 minutes per episode Season 2: approx. 80–90 minutes per episode

Original release
- Network: SBS
- Release: May 4, 2014 – April 14, 2015

Related
- Good Sunday

Roommate (Korean: 룸메이트) is a South Korean reality show; formerly part of SBS's Good Sunday lineup. It was first scheduled to be aired on April 20, 2014, but due to the Sewol ferry tragedy and the temporary broadcast halt, the airing date was pushed to May 4, 2014. The show features eleven celebrities living together in a share house located in the Seongbuk-dong area of Seoul, sharing common spaces such as the kitchen, living room, and washrooms, as well as household tasks. The house features sixty cameras and five bedrooms.

Six of the original eleven roommates left the show ending the first season of Roommate on September 14, 2014. Seven new roommates were added for a brand new second season beginning September 21, 2014. With the return of K-pop Star to Good Sunday, Roommate moved to airing every Tuesday at 11:15 pm as a stand-alone program starting November 25, 2014. The second season was cancelled due to low ratings with the final episode airing on April 14, 2015. It was confirmed that there will be no season 3.

== Season 1 ==
The original roommates were Lee So-ra, Park Bom and mixed martial artist Song Ga-yeon, Jo Se-ho and Lee Dong-wook, Nana and Hong Soo-hyun, Park Chan-yeol and Shin Sung-woo, and Park Min-woo and Seo Kang-joon. This mix of singers, actors/actresses, comedians, models, DJs and martial artists who have little reality and variety program experience is expected to create new undiscovered characters and laughter. On July 24, 2014, Baek Jung Ryeol of SBS announced that Park Bom had not participated in recordings since July 11, 2014, due to her amphetamine scandal and she officially left the program, with her final episode airing on July 27, 2014. On August 20, 2014, it was announced that Lee So-ra would leave the program due to schedule conflicts. On August 27, 2014, Song Ga-yeon was also confirmed to leave the show to focus on her career. On September 1, 2014, Shin Sung-woo announced on Twitter he would be leaving the show. On September 11, 2014, it was announced that Hong Soo-hyun would also be leaving to focus on her acting career. On September 12, 2014, it was announced that Park Chan-yeol would also be leaving the show due to his busy schedule. With more than half of the original members leaving the show, the producers announced a brand new season with new members alongside the remaining members of season 1.

== Season 2 ==
A new season of Roommate was announced following the departure of several members. This season's concept is Home share, Whole share, where the members not only live together, but learn and share from each other. The new cast consisted of the remaining five roommates and seven new roommates. The new members featured a broad spectrum of the celebrities ranging from veteran stars to foreigners to rookie stars. The new roommates are Sunny, Park Joon-hyung, Jackson, Ryohei Otani, Lee Guk-joo, Bae Jong-ok, and Heo Young-ji. With the return of K-pop Star to Good Sunday, it was announced that Roommate would move to Tuesday nights airing at 11:15 pm replacing Magic Eye beginning November 25, 2014.

Roommate season 2 ended on April 14, 2015, after 26 episodes. Although preparations were being made for a new season, Roommate was confirmed to be cancelled due to low ratings; the last episode aired on April 14, 2015.

== Cast ==
=== Season 1 members ===
Name	Profession	Birthday	Room	Prior living arrangement	Appearances
Park Bom (2NE1)	Singer	March 24, 1984 (age 42)	Room 1	With 2NE1	Season 1
Lee So-ra	Model, radio personality, MC	November 4, 1969 (age 57)	Room 1	Alone (for 20 years)	Season 1
Song Ga-yeon	Mixed martial artist	December 28, 1994 (age 31)	Room 1	Alone	Season 1
Shin Sung-woo	Singer, actor	July 26, 1968 (age 58)	Room 4	Alone (for 30 years)	Season 1
Park Chan-yeol (EXO)	Singer, rapper, actor	November 27, 1992 (age 33)	Room 4	With group members	Season 1
Hong Soo-hyun	Actress	February 15, 1981 (age 45)	Room 3	With parents	Season 1
Nana (After School)	Singer, model, actress	September 14, 1991 (age 35)	Room 3	With group members	Season 1 & 2
Seo Kang-joon (5urprise)	Actor, Singer	October 12, 1993 (age 33)	Room 5 ➡ Room 2	With group members	Season 1 & 2
Park Min-woo	Actor	March 22, 1988 (age 38)	Room 5 ➡ Room 2	Alone	Season 1 & 2
Lee Dong-wook	Actor	November 6, 1981 (age 44)	Room 2 ➡ Room 5	With parents	Season 1 & 2
Jo Se-ho	Comedian, actor	August 9, 1982 (age 44)	Room 2 ➡ Room 5	Alone	Season 1 & 2

=== Season 2 members ===
Name	Profession	Birthday	Room	Prior living arrangement	Appearance
Lee Dong-wook	Actor	November 6, 1981 (age 44)	Room 3	With parents	Season 1 & 2
Jo Se-ho	Comedian, actor	August 9, 1982 (age 44)	Room 3	Alone	Season 1 & 2
Park Min-woo	Actor	March 22, 1988 (age 38)	Room 3	Alone	Season 1 & 2
Seo Kang-joon (5urprise)	Actor, singer	October 12, 1993 (age 33)	Room 5	With group members	Season 1 & 2
Nana (After School)	Singer, model, actress	September 14, 1991 (age 35)	Room 1	With group members	Season 1 & 2
Heo Young-ji (KARA)	Singer	August 30, 1994 (age 32)	Room 1	With parents	Season 2
Lee Guk-joo	Comedian	January 5, 1986 (age 40)	Room 1	With family	Season 2
Jackson Wang (GOT7)	Singer, rapper	March 28, 1994 (age 32)	Room 5	with group members	Season 2
Bae Jong-ok	Actress	May 13, 1964 (age 62)	Room 4	With family	Season 2
Sunny (Girls' Generation)	Singer, actress, radio DJ	May 15, 1989 (age 37)	Room 4	With group members	Season 2
Ryohei Otani	Japanese actor, model	October 1, 1980 (age 46)	Room 2	Alone	Season 2
Park Joon-hyung (g.o.d)	Rapper, actor	July 20, 1969 (age 57)	Room 2	With group members	Season 2

== List of episodes ==
=== Season 1 ===
Episode #	Broadcast date	Episode title	Narrator
1	May 4, 2014	If one day, to live with a stranger	Lee Dong-wook
2	May 11, 2014	Approaching you slowly, little by little	Lee So-ra
3	May 18, 2014	Love is an open door	Hong Soo-hyun
4	May 25, 2014	If together, it can't get tastier than this	Shin Sung-woo
5	June 1, 2014	You are my spring	Seo Kang-joon
6	June 8, 2014	Bom's message becomes a reality	Park Bom
7	June 15, 2014	Magic Girl Nana and Laughter Defense Corp Kang-dash Man	Nana
8	June 22, 2014	You are my No.1	Park Min-woo
9	June 29, 2014	Sweet, spicy, and bitter tastes	Chan-yeol
10	July 6, 2014	Youth never comes again	Jo Se-ho
11	July 13, 2014	How nice would it be if only good things happened?	Song Ga-yeon
12	July 20, 2014	Clear skies after cloudy skies	Chan-yeol
13	July 27, 2014	Achieve the goal Sunday	Hong Soo-hyun
14	August 3, 2014	Will joy come after hardship?	Jo Se-ho & Seo Kang-joon
15	August 10, 2014	A summer night's miracle	Jo Se-ho & Seo Kang-joon
16	August 17, 2014	Begin again at the end	Jo Se-ho & Seo Kang-joon
17	August 24, 2014	Enjoy, Song Ga-yeon	Hong Soo-hyun
18	August 31, 2014	In the time with you	Park Min-woo
19	September 7, 2014	To chase or be chased	Hong Soo-hyun
20	September 14, 2014	A passionate goodbye	Hong Soo-hyun

=== Season 2 ===
Episode #	Broadcast date	Episode title, summary
21	September 21, 2014	"Which Star Are You From?" As the new season of Roommate commences with new members, the group slowly begins to break the awkward and unfamiliarity by getting to know each other. The new members introduced themselves to the producers and the audiences first. The casts later arrive at their new home and are assigned to their respective rooms.
22	October 5, 2014	"me Will Like you." In order to get to know each other better, the members draw maps of their brains and talk about their profession, characteristics and personal interests. Nana, Guk-joo and Se-ho leave home to Se-ho's parents' house to get food and on the way, they learnt that it was actually Nana's birthday while Dong-wook, Jong-ok, Joon-hyung, Ryohei and Min-woo take a historic tour around Seongbuk District with the "Roommate" team. Later, Jong-ok and Sunny set out to learn pilates. At night, the members gather to plan a surprise party for Nana before she arrives home.
23	October 12, 2014	"24 Hours Is Not Enough." The episode starts off with Guk-joo cooking for her roommates and as they sit down to eat, Guk-joo talks about how she became a comedian. Later, the members go out for a picnic, playing games and doling out punishments to the losers. After the picnic, Dong-wook takes Ryohei, Jackson and Young-ji out for some shopping which led to Dong-wook being exhausted at the end. After the members return home, Song Ga-yeon pays a visit to their home. The episode ends with Jackson and Joon-hyung teaching the members English and acting out scenes by speaking English.
24	October 19, 2014	"Reply Old Love." The episode begins with Sunny, Ryohei, Joon-hyung, and Jackson going on an outing to pick lotus roots which was planned to be their guests' dinner. When they return to the house, the group prepares dinner as the guests start to arrive. Joon-hyung's cousin, Danny Ahn (one of the members of g.o.d), was the first to arrive followed by Ryohei's friend, Chae Yeon (a singer/actress). While the members were entertaining their guests, Sunny arrives with another guest, Yoona from Girls' Generation. Close to the end, Nana returns home to see that Cucumber's belly was swollen and the members immediately send her to a 24-hour veterinary hospital.
25	October 26, 2014	"How To Get Closer With Your Neighbors?" Jong-ok, Joon-hyung, Jackson, Sunny and Ryohei head out to Bukjeong Village, a nearby neighborhood that is called the last shantytown in Seoul where they tour and meet the locals, while Nana, Se-ho, Guk-joo, and Kang-joon set out to the Finnish Ambassador's home. After meeting their neighbors, the members gather together and decorate their rooms. For dinner, the members prepare fresh thornback ray and 5-year-old kimchi sent by Young-ji's uncle. Meanwhile, Guk-joo joins Baek Ji-young's performance on stage. At the end of the episode, Jong-ok teaches the members about acting and a few members act out the famous play of Shakespeare, Romeo and Juliet.
26	November 2, 2014	"Lee Soon-jae Visits Roommate." Sunny and Jong-ok visit the theater where two very revered veteran actors were performing while Joon-hyung, Se-ho, Jackson, Nana, Guk-joo and Young-ji learn Taekkyeon, a traditional Korean martial art. After watching the performance, Sunny and Jong-ok went home with a guest, Lee Soon-jae. At dinner time, the roommates were all gathered at the dinner table sharing old memories of their past and bringing up old graduation photos. The next morning, Guk-joo and Young-ji are on breakfast duty while Jong-ok wakes up early in the morning to harvest some peppers that are grown in the backyard. Towards the end of the episode, g.o.d have their encore concert with close to 40,000 people in attendance, including fellow members of Roommate, Min-woo, Se-ho, and Kang-joon who came to show their support for Joon-hyung and g.o.d.
27	November 9, 2014	"Boys' Time vs Girls' Time." A "Boys and Girls" outing. Nana, Sunny, and Guk-joo go out for a leisurely stroll that includes a tarot reading, while Ryohei, Joon-hyung, Jackson, and Se-ho decide to go skateboarding. Later, Se-ho invites trot singer Park Hyun-bin to give some singing lessons to Ryohei. Park Hyun-bin leaves on a good note and the roommates begin to start their night time routines. While everyone else seemed to be asleep, Se-ho, Guk-joo, and Jackson were wide awake. They decide to surprise Dong-wook at his filming site.
28	November 16, 2014	"Kimchi War." Joon-hyung, Jackson, Dong-wook and Young-ji head to the market to pick up supplies when the Roommate members decide to make kimchi. Back at the house, the roommates receive the cabbage delivery and get to work peeling vegetables for the kimchi. Se-ho invites Choi Hong-man to help them with making kimchi. When eating dinner, the members gather around to talk about Hong-man's ideal type. Halfway through, Guk-joo's friend, trot goddess Hong Jin-young stops by for a visit. Meanwhile, Guk-joo appears on a radio show and was paid a surprise visit by Kang-joon.
29	November 25, 2014	"Family's Here." Dong-wook, Jackson, Young-ji, Jong-ok, Min-woo and Nana leave to catch eels where the members get into a fun mud fight. Meanwhile, Joon-hyung, Guk-joo, Ryohei and Sunny leave to learn pansori. When they return home at night, Guk-joo brings her brother, Sunkyu, with her. When the members gather together and cook eels in their backyard, Goo Ha-ra from girl group Kara arrives. Young-ji gets tearful when Hara talks about her (Youngji) to her roommates. As the night gets deeper, the members and guests have a dance battle. At the end of the episode, a few members reenact their past auditions.
30	December 2, 2014	"We Won't Stop." The episode starts off with Guk-joo preparing dinner for her roommates. After having their dinner, the members go upstairs to watch Roommate but were shortly interrupted by the doorbell. Apparently, Jong-ok's best friends, actress/singer Yoon Hyun-sook and actress/model Byun Jung-soo have come to pay a visit. Later in the episode, Jackson, Ryohei and Se-ho join a marathon which requires the contestants to climb sixty floors of stairs in less than twenty minutes. Sunny, Nana and Guk-joo go along with them to cheer them on at the beginning of the race (at the starting point) and waited for them on the 60th floor. After that, the Roommate members go out for an outing. Several days later, Guk-joo and Kang-joon visit Jackson for the showcase of GOT7's first official album, in which Kang-joon played a prank on him.
31	December 9, 2014	"Between Beans And Music." One of Ryohei's friends sent huge sacks of beans for the Roommate members which they decided to make tofu and noodles with. To do that, they need a millstone and a large pot which falls to Young-ji, Jackson, Se-ho, and Dong-wook to accomplish. The members who stayed at home helped with sorting out the good beans from the bad beans. During their tofu making, Se-ho gets a phone call from Hong Seok-chun who later pays a visit to the Roommate members and helps them out with making tofu. Later in the evening, Guk-joo gets tearful when she talks about her career and the support she gets from the family.
32	December 16, 2014	"Will It Snow On Christmas?" The Roommate members decide on whom to invite over for the Christmas party when Se-ho suggests Jackson to invite his CEO, Park Jin Young over. To convince his CEO to come over, Jackson and Se-ho drop by JYP Entertainment. They tried their best to persuade him which he later agrees saying that he will make time for the Christmas Party. When the guests arrive at the share house, they were welcomed warmly. Towards the end of the episode, Park Jin Young discusses his surprise for Jackson - to invite Jackson's mom to the Christmas party- with Dong-wook and Se-ho.
33	December 23, 2014	"A Christmas Miracle." After Christmas dinner with the guests, Se-ho's parents give Jackson a scarf as a Christmas present. The Christmas party soon gets underway, with the Roommate members performing for their guests, as well as, performances by both Lee Gook-joo's and her guest, Baek Ji Young. After Se-ho and Young-ji's performance of JYP's Honey, Se-ho suddenly gets tearful as part of a setup for Jackson's surprise. Park Jin Young (JYP) announces he has a surprise present for Jackson...his parents, coming in all the way from Hong Kong. Jackson, upon seeing his mother, immediately runs over to her and gives her a hug, crying tears of joy. The party ends with the Roommate members singing Santa Claus Is Coming To Town. After all of the festivities, Jackson stays by his mother's side. The episode ends with Jackson and his mother spending the next day together out in Seoul.
34	January 6, 2015	"White Winter, Black Winter." Following wins by Roommates Jackson, Lee Guk Joo, Jo Seo Ho and Bae Jong OK, the Roommates awake to a snow storm. Earlier, Bae and Ryohei had delivered food to the area and were concerned about how they kept warm. Lee dong Wook wakes Jo Seo Ho up to go to that area to receive a huge delivery of coal for the community. Later, the Roommates get dressed and go to the site to help deliver coal directly to the residents. When the task becomes overwhelming, Lee Dong Wook suggests that some of the Roommates call for help. Jackson's Got7 members arrive, with the exception of the leader, JB, believing they were going to eat Barbecue. Jo Seo Ho's friends arrive but, after seeing Guk Joo covered in soot, realize that Lee Dong Wook has played one of his pranks on them. 5urprise, Seo Kang Jun's group drop by to help, as well. Later the guys go to the bath house where they discover new things about each other.
35	January 13, 2015	'"Meat Party." Guk-joo invites her comedian friends Hong Yoon-hwa and Kim Min-kyung over to the Roommate house to spend the evening with her and Youngji. The house is filled with laughter as they candidly talk about their love life, careers and men. Guk-joo plays a prank on Se-ho by having Yoon-hwa and Min-kyung speak to him on the phone and tricking him into thinking that he was speaking to beautiful news anchors. Joon returns to house and is surprised to be greeted by Yoon-hwa, who was a zealous fan of g.o.d. The rest of the members return to the house after their individual activities. Dong-wook, Ryohei and Joon roast sweet potatoes out in the yard and discuss "men's issues". Later, Lee Guk Joo, Jackson and Young Ji decide to do a music video featuring them dancing and performing to the song, "WeJang" featuring a cameo from Cucumber. Lee Dong Wook, Ryohei and Joon Hyung look in Guk Joo's window to notice Jackson dancing. Joon Hyung remarks, "They sure know how to have fun". After that, the ladies gather in Guk-joo and Nana's room to discuss dating and, of course, men. The show boasted some of the highest ratings of the season.
36	January 20, 2015	"Shoo and the Twins." Sunny invites her former mentor, Shoo, from the group SES, over for a few days. Shoo arrives with her twin daughters, Im Rayul, Im Rahui, who are crying as they are uncomfortable in the crowded Roommate house. All of the Roommates try to comfort them, unsuccessfully. Then, Jo Seo Ho decides to take Lee Guk Joo's pictures out of the room. This caused the kids to go to the wall pointing and saying Guk Joo, as if wondering why her pictures had to be moved. They left looking through the hallway. The kids are frightened by Ryoshei, which distressed him. Later, Guk Joo calms one of the twins down and makes friends with the other one. One of the twins kisses Jackson and they both become comfortable enough for Shoo to leave them home with Guk Joo while she, Jackson, and Nana go shopping. Jackson "bodyguards" Shoo to protect her from shoppers who get too close. He wants to pay the check but his credit card comes up as insufficient funds. He is embarrassed that Shoo had to pay for the groceries and offers to pay her back. Later, there is a knock at the door, it is Shoo's husband.
37	January 27, 2015	"Shoo, Im Hyo Sung and the Twins." Im Ho Sung arrives to find that he may have been away too long. Shoo and the kids have settled into the Roommate house. Jackson is washing dishes and the kids are formally greeting him at the door. He is entertained by Sunny and Shoo's dancing. Afterwards, he is asked which one he liked best. Unfortunately, he says he can not decide. Shortly after this, the couple is left alone with the kids in the living room. When he tries to kiss his wife, one of the twins interrupts them. Shoo leaves to vacuum and the kids walk away. A cold breeze appears to represent the cold shoulder they are giving him. As the dishes are dirty again, Jo Se Ho suggests a basketball game to decide if Im Ho Sung and Shoo would receive free baby sitting services, or if Im Ho Sung would have to do the dishes. Losing by 1 point, Jackson is left to do the dishes while Shoo and Im Ho Sung are given a coupon for free babysitting services. After they leave, Lee Dong Wook gives Park Joon Hyung and Ryoshei Lessons in Korean. In the meantime, the ladies are in Guk Joo's room discussing, of course, men. Park Joon Hyung leads the guys into the women's room when the lesson is finished. Laughter follows. This episode had the highest rating.
38	February 3, 2015	"Old Haunts" The Roommate gets a visit from Nam Bo-ryung, the daughter of veteran comedian and MC Nam Hee-suk, and her schoolmates. They interviewed Se-ho about his occupation as a comedian. Meanwhile, Joon was telling Jackson and Sunny about g.o.d's difficult trainee days when they get an idea to visit g.o.d's old dorm in Ilsan and post an impromptu fan-meeting invitation on Instagram. Bo-ryung's father later visits the Roommate house himself, much to the delight of the members. Youngji and Se-ho attempt to make dinner for their special guest but it does not turn out the way they had hoped. Joon's cousin and fellow g.o.d member Danny Ahn unexpectedly turns up at the old dorm and joins their "sightseeing" adventure around Ilsan, sharing memories with Jackson and Sunny about their time living in the then-underdeveloped Ilsan. The older members join Nam Hee-suk for a late night snack and they drink and talk into the wee hours. The next morning a mysterious figure appears over the couch where Guk-joo is sleeping.
39	February 10, 2015	"Roommates At Work" Ok Taecyeon of 2PM arrives to help Jackson make breakfast but finds the whole Roommate house still fast asleep after a late night (as shown in the previous episode). Jackson gives Taecyeon an impromptu tour of the house and goes into each room to wake the members up, surprising them. They leave Taecyeon to help Sunny clean up the messy dining area and living room. Jackson and Kang-joon follow Youngji to her mother's café while Nana, Ryohei and Joon go to Ryohei's friend's restaurant to repay them for goods.
40	February 24, 2015	" The Return of Crazy Cow" Cultwo's Jung Chan-woo and Kim Tae-gyun visit Roommate house after being invited by Guk-joo and Dong-wook. Kim brings his young son Bum-jun along as the boy was a fan of the show and wanted to meet Jackson, his favorite cast member. The comedians bring the audience back in time as they perform one of their most famous skits from over a decade ago. Meanwhile, Dong-wook, Ryohei, Jong-ok and Youngji head to Seonjaryeong for a camping trip in the snow.
41	March 3, 2015	"The Macho Long Distance Dad." Kim Heung-Guk and Lee Kye-In visit the Roommate house to see Bae Jong Ok. As Jo Seo Ho picks up Lee Kye-In, Kim Heung-Guk arrives at the house early and meets Jackson. Jackson recognizes him and treats him with his usual hospitality. He invites him to Lee Guk Joo's new vibrating bed and does leg and calf massages on him ( staying in practice for his Mother's physical therapy). The two men meet Bae Jong Ok and recant how they felt upon meeting her for the first time. In the living room, Jackson asks if he could meet Kim Heung-Guk's daughter. He tells Jackson that she is around 7 years younger than him. Lee Kye-In tells him that Jackson is from a good family. Kim Heung-Guk says that she has to finish college first, but the age difference of 7 years would be no problem since they would both be in their 20s. He said that he believes Jackson would be a good son-in-law. Later, Dong wook visits Jun Hoon Moo with Ryohei and Park Joon in order ask him to help teach Korean to the two novices. After a few questions from Park Joon Hyung, he decides that he needs help teaching them, himself.
42	March 10, 2015	"Jackson's Three Wishes." Roommate casts celebrates Jackson's 22nd birthday and grants him 3 birthday wishes. Jackson requests some ridiculous wishes such as putting his head in the mouth of a trained tiger, going to a deserted island, taking care of a Donkey and for Youngji to listen to him for a day. They decided to go to a Donkey farm in Gunsan to fulfil one of Jackson's birthday wish. In order to persuade the owner to sell the Donkey cheaper to him, Jackson does the aegyo and Youngji dances to "Mamma Mia". They successfully persuades the owner to borrow the Donkey for 3 days, which Jackson named 'Michael' and the Donkey gets transported back to the sharehouse in Seoul. At the sharehouse, chef Choi Hyun-suk teaches some techniques to Seho and Ryohei, cooking a variety of dishes including steak. The Roommate casts have a hearty dinner and the episode ends with the Roommate casts interacting and taking selfies with Michael, as well as the preview for the next episode.
43	March 17, 2015	"Spring is Coming." The episode begins with Jackson waking up to hear the cries of Michael who is hungry. Jackson rushes down to feed Michael carrots and water but Michael rejects the food. In order to get closer to Michael, Jackson changes into an 'Eeyore' costume which scared Youngji. This time, Kangjoon returns with Jackson's birthday present which is underwear knowing Jackson's desire to film an underwear CF. Together with Seho, the trio tried acting out an underwear CF before Gukjoo and Youngji went to the market to buy some fabric and seeds to plant. Kim Hyun-joo then visits the sharehouse and shows her talents in flowers, cooking and sewing. After which, Joonhyung, Jackson and Youngji went to the park together with Michael to take a stroll. Kim Jung-nan visits the sharehouse later and prepares dinner whereby the Roommate casts took selfies with the purpose of making the guests stand out with their expressions. Kim Hyun-joo further displays her talents in piano, guitar, dancing, beatboxing and singing. The episode ends with Seho, Kangjoon, Jackson and Youngji interacting with Michael for one last time before the owner brought him back to Gunsan, making Michael cry.
44	March 24, 2015	The guests are Kim Soo-mi and Byun Jung-soo. Kim Soo-mi brings food and side dishes that she made and prepares the Roommate casts a traditional Korean lunch. After going on a mini "date" with Jackson, she comes back their share house and makes dinner.
45	April 7, 2015	The guests are Jackson's foreign friends: Amber from f(x) and Henry Lau, and BamBam from Got7. The men takes turn to show how they would propose to a lady, with Youngji as the judge. Jackson and the guests learn about the correct way to bow to their elders.
46	April 14, 2015	The episode starts out with Bae Jong Ok, Ryohei, and Seho waiting to get their health physical. They are later joined by Dong Wook. While Joong Hyun, Youngji, Sunny, and Nana goes to learn flying yoga/pilates. Afterwards, Gook Ju, Youngji, Seho, Ryohei, and Minwoo participate in the Namsan Walking Event. Then they exchange gifts with each other.

== Guest appearances ==
=== Season 1 ===
Episode	Guest	Remarks
7	EXO	S1 E7
8	Yoo ll & Lee Tae Hwan	S1 E8
10	Lee Deok-hwa	S1 E10
13	Baekhyun (EXO)	S1 E13
14	Masamori Tokuyama	S1 E14
14-16	Jeffrey Kung	S1 E14, 15, 16
16	Lizzy (After School) & Kaeun (After School)	S1 E16

=== Season 2 ===
Episode	Guest	Remarks
23	Song Ga-yeon	S2 E3
24	Yoona (Girls' Generation), Danny Ahn (g.o.d), Chae Yeon	S2 E4
26	Lee Soon-jae	S2 E6
27	Park Hyun-bin, Shin Se-kyung	S2 E7
28	Choi Hong-man, Hong Jin-young	S2 E8
29	Goo Hara (KARA)	S2 E9
30	Yoon Hyun-sook & Byun Jung-soo, GOT7	S2 E10
31	Hong Seok-cheon	S2 E11
32, 33	Park Jin-young & Baek Ji-young	S2 E12, 13
34	GOT7, Jang Ye-won, Nam Chang-hee, Kim Joon-ho, 5urprise	S2 E14
35	Hong Yoon-hwa & Kim Min-kyung	S2 E15
36	Shoo (S.E.S.) with her twin daughters (Im Rayul, Im Rahui)	S2 E16
37	Shoo (S.E.S.) with her twin daughters (Im Rayul, Im Rahui) & husband Im Hyo-sung	S2 E17
38	Danny Ahn (g.o.d) & Nam Hee-suk	S2 E18
39	Ok Taecyeon (2PM)	S2 E19
40	Cultwo & Kim Tae-gyun's son, Kim Bum-jun	S2 E20
41	Kim Heung-gook, Lee Kye-in & Jun Hyun-moo	S2 E21
42	Choi Hyun-seok	S2 E22
43	Kim Hyun-joo & Kim Jung-nan	S2 E23
44	Kim Soo-mi & Byun Jung-soo	S2 E24
45	Amber (f(x)), Henry (Super Junior-M) & BamBam (GOT7)	S2 E25

== Ratings ==
In the ratings below, the highest rating for the show will in be red, and the lowest rating for the show will be in blue.

List of ratings

Ratings listed below are the individual corner ratings of Roommate. (Note: Individual corner ratings do not include commercial time, which regular ratings include.)

Episode #	Original airdate	TNmS Ratings		AGB Ratings	
Episode #	Original airdate	Nationwide	Seoul National Capital Area	Nationwide	Seoul National Capital Area
Season 1
1	May 4, 2014	6.0%	6.9%	6.1%	6.6%
2	May 11, 2014	6.6%	8.7%	6.8%	6.9%
3	May 18, 2014	5.2%	6.6%	5.3%	5.5%
4	May 25, 2014	6.5%	8.5%	6.3%	7.2%
5	June 1, 2014	6.4%	7.0%	5.4%	6.4%
6	June 8, 2014	5.2%	7.3%	5.5%	6.8%
7	June 15, 2014	4.7%	6.5%	4.4%	5.1%
8	June 22, 2014	5.4%	6.7%	4.4%	4.6%
9	June 29, 2014	5.3%	6.0%	5.0%	5.4%
10	July 6, 2014	5.0%	5.4%	4.9%	5.7%
11	July 13, 2014	5.4%	5.9%	4.5%	4.9%
12	July 20, 2014	4.8%	5.9%	4.1%	5.1%
13	July 27, 2014	4.2%	6.0%	3.1%	4.4%
14	August 3, 2014	5.5%	6.0%	5.2%	5.6%
15	August 10, 2014	4.6%	5.9%	4.5%	4.8%
16	August 17, 2014	4.8%	6.6%	4.6%	5.4%
17	August 24, 2014	5.4%	6.1%	4.7%	5.4%
18	August 31, 2014	4.3%	5.6%	4.3%	4.6%
19	September 7, 2014	3.0%	3.7%	3.6%	4.0%
20	September 14, 2014	3.7%	3.9%	4.2%	5.1%
Season 2
21	September 21, 2014	6.0%	7.7%	6.3%	7.1%
22	October 5, 2014	4.2%	5.0%	5.0%	5.3%
23	October 12, 2014	5.1%	6.4%	5.5%	6.5%
24	October 19, 2014	7.2%	9.2%	8.2%	8.9%
25	October 26, 2014	5.4%	6.5%	5.2%	5.9%
26	November 2, 2014	4.7%	6.1%	5.1%	5.7%
27	November 9, 2014	5.0%	6.6%	5.5%	6.2%
28	November 16, 2014	4.9%	6.1%	5.6%	5.9%
29	November 25, 2014	2.7%	3.4%	3.3%	3.5%
30	December 2, 2014	2.4%	3.2%	3.0%	3.6%
31	December 9, 2014	2.7%	3.5%	3.1%	3.4%
32	December 16, 2014	3.8%	4.4%	4.7%	5.6%
33	December 23, 2014	4.6%	5.6%	5.1%	5.9%
34	January 6, 2015	4.3%	4.4%	4.7%	5.3%
35	January 13, 2015	6.0%		5.5%	
36	January 20, 2015	6.2%		7.0%	
37	January 27, 2015			4.8%	
38	February 3, 2015			4.6%	
39	February 10, 2015			4.6%	
40	February 24, 2015			4.8%	
41	March 3, 2015			3.5%	
42	March 10, 2015			3.7%	
43	March 17, 2015			3.8%	
44	March 24, 2015			5.3%	
45	April 7, 2015			3.0%	
46	April 14, 2015			3.2%	

== OST ==
Roommate OST Part 1
No.	Title	Lyrics	Music	Artist	Length
1.	"Roommate" (룸메이트)	A.T, PAKI	Yoon Jong-shin, Lee Geun-ho	Lim Kim, Eddy Kim	03:52
Total length:					03:52

Roommate OST Part 2
No.	Title	Lyrics	Music	Artist	Length
1.	"Good Morning" (굿모닝)	Yoon Jong-shin	Yoon Jong-shin	A.T	02:57
Total length:					02:57

== Awards and nominations ==
Year	Award	Category	Recipient	Result
2014	SBS Entertainment Awards	Best Male Newcomer	Jackson Wang	Won
2014	SBS Entertainment Awards	Best Male Newcomer	Seo Kang-joon	Nominated
2014	SBS Entertainment Awards	Best Female Newcomer	Bae Jong-ok	Won
2014	SBS Entertainment Awards	New Star Award	Jo Se-ho	Won
2014	SBS Entertainment Awards	New Star Award	Lee Guk-joo	Won
2015	51st Baeksang Arts Awards	Best Female Performer in Variety	Lee Guk-joo	Won
