= Cho Yoon-woo =

South Korean actor (born 1991)

- Born: July 27, 1991 (age 35); South Korea
- Other name: Jo Yoon-woo
- Education: Dong-Ah Broadcasting College – Broadcasting and Entertainment
- Occupation: Actor
- Years active: 2011–2026
- Agent: King Kong by Starship

Korean name
- Hangul: 조윤우
- RR: Jo Yunu
- MR: Cho Yunu

Cho Yoon-woo (Korean: 조윤우; born July 27, 1991) is a South Korean actor. He made his acting debut in the tvN's television series Cool Guys, Hot Ramen (2011). He was also part of the ensemble cast of another romantic comedy television series on the same cable channel, Dating Agency: Cyrano (2013). He is best known for starring in the television series Hwarang: The Poet Warrior Youth (2016–17)

== Personal life ==
On January 2, 2026, Cho announced his upcoming marriage to his girlfriend of over four years and that he was retiring from acting.

== Filmography ==
=== Television series ===
Year	Title	Role
2011	Cool Guys, Hot Ramen	Woo Hyun-woo
2012	Just an Ordinary Love Story	Han Jae-kwang (young)
2012	The Strongest K-Pop Survival	Han Dong-woo
2012	Missing You	Karaoke receptionist (ep.5)
2013	King of Ambition	Ha-ryu's partner (ep.2-4)
2013	Dating Agency: Cyrano	Do Ah-rang
2013	Ugly Alert	Lee Dong-woo (from ep.55)
2013	The Heirs	Moon Joon-young
2014	Hotel King	Yoo Joo-min (ep.17-18)
2014	A Mother's Choice	Kim Kyung-joon
2014	Naeil's Cantabile	Lee Jae-yong
2015	Mask	Oh Chang-soo
2015	I Am Your Chatter Phone	Su li
2015	I Order You	Nam Soo-ri
2016	Puck!	Jung Pal-bong
2016	Hwarang: The Poet Warrior Youth	Kim Yeo-wool
2017	Band of Sisters	Koo Se-joon
2023	Not Others	Min-gi

=== Film ===
Year	Title	Role
2014	Scarlet Innocence	Handsome guy at the club
2015	Perfect Proposal	Jin-sub
