= Rockin' on Heaven's Door =

- Hangul: 뜨거운 안녕
- RR: Tteugeoun annyeong
- MR: Ttŭgŏun annyŏng
- Directed by: Nam Taek-soo
- Written by: Nam Taek-soo; Lee Nan-young
- Produced by: Jung Hye-young; Choi Gi-seop; Kim Hong-baek; Min Jin-su; Nam Taek-soo; Kim Ji-seok
- Starring: Lee Hong-ki; Baek Jin-hee; Ma Dong-seok; Im Won-hee; Jeon Min-seo
- Cinematography: Ju Seong-rim
- Edited by: Kim Sun-min
- Music by: Lee Jin-hee
- Distributed by: 9ers Entertainment
- Release date: May 30, 2013
- Running time: 100 minutes
- Country: South Korea
- Language: Korean
- Box office: US$221,232

Rockin' on Heaven's Door (Korean: 뜨거운 안녕; lit. 'Passionate Goodbye') is a 2013 South Korean film directed by Nam Taek-soo, starring F.T. Island lead vocalist Lee Hong-ki as an idol star who learns to cope with his past and rediscovers music during community work at a hospice for terminally ill patients.

== Plot ==
Chung-ui is a famous Korean pop star with a temper. After he beats up a man at a night club, he is sentenced to do community service at a hospice for terminally ill patients. The reluctant young man first hates his chores and dislikes the people around him, but as he gets to know their stories, he becomes attached to them. The hospice struggles with funding, leading to a possible close-down, so the hospice in-house band, The Phoenix Band decides to apply to a talent show on television. For this, they need an original song, so they ask Chung-ui to help them. The singer refuses at first, then tries to use the opportunity to reduce his sentence days. He ends up seriously changing his mind about music, his behavior and grows to accept his mother's death, while helping the patients achieve their dreams. Even after the death of the band members, he continues to revive The Phoenix Band each time, assisting new patients.

== Cast ==
- Lee Hong-gi as Chung-ui
- Baek Jin-hee as Anna
- Ma Dong-seok as Mu-seong
- Im Won-hee as Bong-shik
- Jeon Min-seo as Ha-eun
- Shim Yi-young as Power Mom
- Lee Min-ah as Ha-eun's mother
- Jeon Soo-kyung as Hospice director nun
- Choi Kwon as Gwang-sam
- No Kang-min as Him-chan
- Bae Ho-geun as Cheol-soo
- Lee Jae-goo as Chung-ui's father
- Kwak Ja-hyeong as Ha-eun's father
- Jeong Joo-ri as Nurse Jeong
- Kim Yoo-in as Nurse Kim
- Kim Kwang-hyeon as producer in preliminary exhibition room
- Kim Hyeon-ah as Chung-ui's mother
- Yoo Chang-sook as Young-sik's dying mother
- Cha Jong-ho as Young-sik
- Shin An-jin as creditor 1
- Baek Ik-nam as creditor 2
- Kim Soo-bok as bathing grandfather
- Hyeon Seong as agency boss
- Yoo Jae-myung as intensive care unit doctor

== Soundtrack ==
Rockin' on Heaven's Door: Original Sound Track

Soundtrack album by Various Artists
- Released: May 15, 2013
- Genres: Pop, K-pop, soundtrack, R&B
- Label: CJ E&M Music
- Producer: FNC Entertainment

No.	Title	Artist	Length
1.	"Jump"	Lee Hong-ki
2.	"Goodbye"	Lee Hong-ki
3.	"뜨거운 안녕" (Passionate Goodbye)	Various Artists
4.	"편지" (Letter)	Various Artists
5.	"평온한 호스피스 병동" (Happy Hospice)	Various Artists
6.	"회상" (Remember)	Various Artists

== Release ==
Rockin' on Heaven's Door was released in South Korea on May 30, 2013. It received 46,310 admissions during its theatrical run and grossed a total of US$219,806.

Prior to its domestic release, the film was also sold to Japan, Hong Kong, Singapore, Malaysia, Brunei, and Indonesia. It opened in Japan (with the title Phoenix, Song of Promise) on June 7, 2013, and Singapore on August 22, 2013.
