= The Life Academy =

2017 South Korean television program

- Promotional poster
- 우리들의 인생학교
- Genre: Reality; Variety
- Directed by: Son Chang-woo
- Country of origin: South Korea
- Original language: Korean
- No. of seasons: 1
- No. of episodes: 6

Production
- Production location: South Korea
- Running time: 75 minutes

Original release
- Network: tvN
- Release: May 14 – June 22, 2017

The Life Academy (Korean: 우리들의 인생학교) is a 2017 South Korean television program. It airs on tvN on every Sunday at 21:20 (KST) beginning 14 May 2017. From 8 June 2017, the show will air on every Thursday 20:10 KST. The show is a life growth variety show in the form of a school day, in which the show assumes "life also requires schooling". In each lesson, the show invites special guests of various professions as teachers to share contents outside of the textbook.

== Cast ==
=== Students ===
- Kim Yong-man
- Jeong Jun-ha
- Ahn Jung-hwan
- Jeon Hye-bin
- Lee Hong-gi
- Kwak Dong-yeon

== Episodes ==
=== 2017 ===
Episodes #	Broadcast Date	Teacher	Lesson	Periods	Notes
1	May 14, 2017	Son Mi-na (Writer, actress, former announcer)	#1 - Get Closer To Each Other	#0 - Encounter with an unfamiliar person (First meeting) #1 - Theory class (The Little Prince) #2 - Let's eat (2 person at 1 place eating together)	
2	May 21, 2017	Son Mi-na (Writer, actress, former announcer)	#1 - Get Closer To Each Other	#2 - Let's eat (cont.) #3 - Free Time #4 - A word of sweetness (Praising someone while feeding ice cream) #5 - The thoughts For a person (Cook for the member he/she thinks of)	
3	May 28, 2017	Kim Hyun-jung (Korean National Medical Center mental health professor, psychiatrist)	#2 - Understand yourself	#1 - Theory class (Erik Erikson's 8 stages of psychological development) #2 - What do I really want (2 hours of free time to do what he/she really want) #3 - What kind of person am I? (Fill up a questionnaire by completing the sentences to his/her own thinking; revealing the type of person he/she is analysed by Kim Hyun-jung) #4 - Do you want to converse with me? (A one-point lesson with Kim Hyun-jung through the questionnaire filled up by the cast earlier on, using the empty chair technique to converse with himself/herself)	Special interview appearances by Kim Soo-yong, Song Eun-i, Shim Hyung-tak, Seo Hyun-jin, Shin Kyung-mi, Kim Sung-joo, Seo Jang-hoon, Kim Hee-chul, Kim Dong-won, Lee Si-eon, Park Jin-joo
4	June 8, 2017	Oh Young-wook (Architectural designer, travel writer, CEO of design company, husband of Uhm Ji-won)	#3 - Expressing yourself with words (Seaside Village Diary - a 2D1N trip to Yeongdeok County and write a diary)	#0 - Writing an essay to introduce yourself (Pre-lesson homework) #1 - Theory class (Writing emotional expressions) #2 - Seaside village essay contest (1 Page Essay - Write a page of essay with your own emotions freely, no theme) #3 - Seaside village essay presentation #4 - Express your heart, night letter (Writing a letter to his/her special someone)	Special appearances by Han Seong-ho (FNC Entertainment CEO), Kim Gook-jin
5	June 15, 2017	Kang Won-gook (Writer)	#3 - Expressing yourself with words (Seaside Village Diary - a 2D1N trip to Yeongdeok County and write a diary)		
6	June 22, 2017	Pyo Chang-won	#4 - Ways to find things that touch you	#1 - Theory class (through Pyo Chang-won's life story) #2 - Shared learning (sharing what was learned on theory class to 1-day students)	
