= FM302 =

EP by Lee Hong-gi
- Released: November 18, 2015
- Recorded: 2015
- Genres: Alternative rock; hard rock; EDM; synthpop
- Length: 23:02
- Language: Korean
- Label: FNC Entertainment

Lee Hong-gi chronology
FM302 (2015)	AM302 (2015)

Singles from FM302
- 1. "Insensible" Released: November 18, 2015

FM302 is the debut solo extended play (EP) by Lee Hong-gi, the main vocalist of South Korean pop rock band F.T. Island. The EP and its title track "눈치 없이 (Insensible)" were released at 12 a.m. KST on November 18, 2015, by FNC Entertainment.

== Track listing ==
Track listing adapted from Naver Music.

CD
No.	Title	Lyrics	Music	Arrangement	Length
1.	"Let's Seize The Day"	Hong's Tower, Jamil Kazmi	Hong's Tower	Hong's Tower	03:24
2.	"눈치 없이" (Insensible)	Hong's Tower, Han Seung Ho	Steven Lee, Jimmy Richard	Steven Lee	04:01
3.	"Kings For A Day"	Hong's Tower, Jamil Kazmi, Jason Mater, Jovany Javier, Mo Brandis	Jamil Kazmi, Jason Mater	Jamil Kazmi, Jason Mater	03:19
4.	"Be Your Doll"	Hong's Tower	Hong's Tower	Hong's Tower	03:20
5.	"LOL (Loudness Of Love)"	Hong's Tower	Hong's Tower	Hong's Tower	03:47
6.	"비가 와요" (In The Rain)	Hong's Tower	Hong's Tower	Hong's Tower, Corin	05:11
Total length:					23:02

== Charts ==
Chart (2015)	Peak position
South Korean Albums (Circle)	2
