= Lee So-ra (model) =

South Korean model

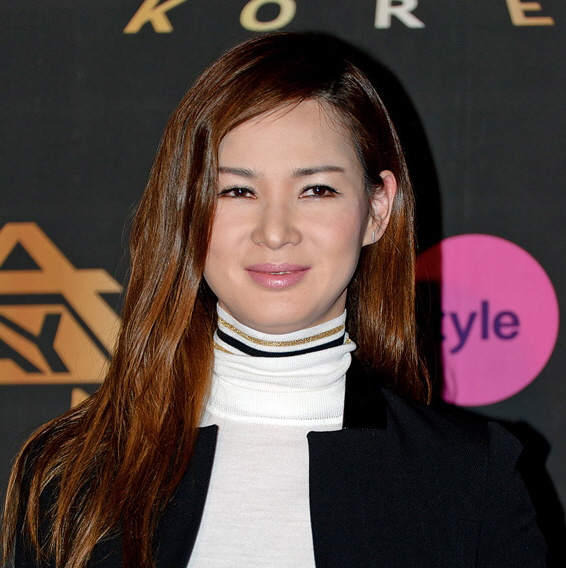
- So-ra in 2012
- Born: November 4, 1969 (age 56); Incheon
- Occupations: Model, Radio DJ, TV Personality
- Modeling information
- Agency: SM C&C

- Lee So-ra
- Hangul: 이소라
- RR: I Sora
- MR: I Sora

Lee So-ra (Korean: 이소라; born November 4, 1969) is a South Korean model and Radio DJ. She was an original member of Roommate. She started her career by winning the Super Model Contest. She is currently a DJ on a radio show titled Lee So Ra's Gayo Plaza.

== Filmography ==
=== TV shows ===
Year	Title	Role	Notes
2009-2012	Project Runway Korea	Herself	
2014	Roommate (Season 1)	Cast Member	As of August 20, she permanently left the program due to schedule conflicts.
