= Modern Farmer (TV series) =

South Korean television series

- Promotional poster
- Genre: Romance; Comedy; Family
- Written by: Kim Ki-ho
- Directed by: Oh Jin-suk
- Starring: Lee Hong-gi; Park Min-woo; Lee Si-eon; Kwak Dong-yeon; Lee Hanee
- Country of origin: South Korea
- Original language: Korean
- No. of episodes: 20

Production
- Executive producer: Son Jung-hyun
- Producer: Lee Hee-soo
- Production location: South Korea
- Running time: 60 minutes Saturdays and Sundays at 20:45 (KST)

Original release
- Network: Seoul Broadcasting System
- Release: October 18 – December 27, 2014

Modern Farmer (Korean: 모던파머) is a 2014 South Korean television series starring Lee Hong-gi, Park Min-woo, Lee Si-eon, Kwak Dong-yeon, and Lee Hanee. It aired on SBS from October 18 to December 21, 2014 on Saturdays and Sundays at 20:45 for 20 episodes.

== Plot ==
Members of rock band Excellent Souls (ExSo) decide to give up their life in Seoul and move to a small town in the countryside to farm the land that Lee Min-ki's grandmother left to him upon her death, in order to get all the money they need to make an album and get their fame back. When Min-ki gets there, he learns that the village leader is his first love, Kang Yoon-hee.

== Cast ==
- Lee Hong-gi as Lee Min-ki
- Park Min-woo as Kang Hyeok
- Lee Si-eon as Yoo Han-cheol
- Kwak Dong-yeon as Han Ki-joon
- Lee Hanee as Kang Yoon-hee
- Lee Han-wi as Kang Young-sik
- Lee Il-hwa as Yoon Hye-jung
- Kim Jae-hyun as Park Hong-gu
- Hwang Jae-won as Kang Min-ho
- Kim Byeong-ok as Han In-ki
- Park Jin-joo as Han Sang-eun
- Jo Sang-gun as Park Deuk-chool
- Kim Bu-seon as Lee Yong-nyeo
- Seo Dong-won as Park Sang-deuk
- Kwon Mina as Lee Soo-yeon
- Park Young-soo as Hwang Man-gu
- Oh Young-shil as Kim Soon-boon
- Jo Woo-ri as Hwang Yi-ji
- Kim Ju-hyeon as Song Hwa-ran
- Jung Shi-ah as Yoo Mi-young
- Jang Seo-hee as Choi Eun-woo
- Han Bo-reum as Han Yoo-na
- Yoo Ji-yeon as Yoon Mi-ja
- Kim Won-hae as Doksa ("poisonous snake")
- Kim Ji-eun as Mi-na
- Nam Myung-ryul as Hospital director Kang
- Lee Do-kyung as Assemblyman Kim
- --- as Assemblyman Kim's assistant
- Ryu Hye-rin as High school girl (ep 1)
- Jung Kyu-soo as Physician
- Choi Jong-hoon as Village head of Sangdurok-ri (ep 5)
- Shim Kwon-ho as Wrestling athlete from Sangdurok-ri (ep 5)
- Lee Do-yeon as Bong-ryun
- Park Wan-kyu as President of Rock Club
- Kim Byung-chul as Han-cheol's boss

== Ratings ==
- In the table below, the blue numbers represent the lowest ratings and the red numbers represent the highest ratings.

Episode #	Original broadcast date	Average audience share			
Episode #	Original broadcast date	TNmS Ratings		AGB Nielsen	
Episode #	Original broadcast date	Nationwide	Seoul National Capital Area	Nationwide	Seoul National Capital Area
1	October 18, 2014	4.8%	5.2%	4.3%	4.9%
2	October 19, 2014	4.9%	5.3%	5.2%	5.6%
3	October 25, 2014	4.5%	5.1%	4.9%	5.2%
4	October 26, 2014	5.3%	6.1%	5.4%	6.5%
5	November 1, 2014	5.6%	6.6%	5.1%	5.8%
6	November 2, 2014	5.4%	6.4%	6.3%	7.1%
7	November 8, 2014	3.9%	4.5%	4.6%	5.2%
8	November 9, 2014	4.6%	4.9%	5.0%	5.4%
9	November 15, 2014	4.3%	4.6%	5.1%	5.5%
10	November 16, 2014	4.3%	4.9%	4.4%	4.9%
11	November 22, 2014	3.6%	4.0%	4.3%	4.7%
12	November 23, 2014	4.5%	4.7%	4.6%	4.6%
13	November 29, 2014	3.7%	4.6%	4.3%	4.5%
14	November 30, 2014	3.6%	4.4%	4.0%	4.2%
15	December 6, 2014	4.3%	5.0%	4.4%	4.5%
16	December 7, 2014	3.9%	4.3%	4.1%	4.9%
17	December 13, 2014	3.2%	3.5%	3.6%	4.4%
18	December 14, 2014	3.8%	4.6%	4.2%	5.2%
19	December 20, 2014	2.8%	3.5%	3.6%	4.6%
20	December 27, 2014	3.4%	4.2%	4.0%	4.1%
Average		4.2%	4.8%	4.6%	5.1%

== Awards and nominations ==
Year	Award	Category	Recipient	Result
2014	SBS Drama Awards	Excellence Award, Actress in a Drama Special	Lee Ha-nui	Nominated
2014	SBS Drama Awards	Special Award, Actress in a Drama Special	Lee Il-hwa	Nominated
