= Cheers (Lee Hong-gi album) =

Studio album by Lee Hong-gi
- Released: December 5, 2018
- Length: 30:23
- Language: Japanese
- Label: Warner Music Japan

Lee Hong-gi chronology
Do n Do (2018)	Cheers (2018)

Singles from Cheers
- 1. "Pathfinders" Released: October 22, 2018

Cheers is a Japanese-language studio album from South Korean singer Lee Hong-gi, the main singer of the band F.T. Island. It was released on December 5, 2018, by Warner Music Japan. The album includes Japanese versions of three songs that were previously released in Lee Hong-gi's Korean-language album Do n Do.

== Background and release ==
On September 27, 2018, Lee Hong-gi announced that his upcoming album Cheers will be released on December 5, 2018. The album is supposed to have a positive message, with a theme of challenging new things and pushing forward without fear.

On October 22, the music video for "Pathfinders", the lead single of Cheers, was released. The video features Lee Hong-gi dancing with eight dancers from 1MILLION Dance Studio, including May J Lee, who worked together with Lee Hong-gi as trainers on Produce 48. The dance was choreographed by May J Lee and Jinwoo Yoon of 1MILLION Dance Studio. A dance performance music video was released on October 25. Lee Hong-gi later stated in an interview that the music video shows empathy spreading among people as they gradually join in to dance, as the many people with tattoos may often be seen with prejudice.

The album tracklist was revealed on October 29, and the album itself was released on December 5.

== Track listing ==
CD
No.	Title	Length
1.	"Pathfinders"	4:07
2.	"Glorious Love"	3:04
3.	"Cookies" (feat. Jung Il-hoon of BTOB)	3:07
4.	"Come to Me" (feat. Zuho of SF9)	3:26
5.	"I Am" (with Cheetah)	3:54
6.	"Thank You"	2:47
7.	"Bonfire" (feat. DinDin)	3:20
8.	"Yellow Light"	3:39
9.	"Good Night"	3:13
Total length:		30:23

DVD
No.	Title	Length
1.	"Pathfinders ＜Music Video＞"
2.	"The Making of –Pathfinders–"

== Charts ==
Chart (2018)	Peak position
Japan Weekly Albums (Oricon)	10
Japan Hot Albums (Billboard)	13
