= Flower Boy Ramen Shop =

2011 South Korean television series

- Promotional poster
- Also known as: Flower Boy Ramyun Shop
- Genre: Romance; Comedy
- Written by: Yoon Nan-joong
- Directed by: Jung Jung-hwa
- Starring: Jung Il-woo; Lee Chung-ah; Lee Ki-woo; Park Min-woo; Cho Yoon-woo
- Country of origin: South Korea
- Original language: Korean
- No. of episodes: 16

Production
- Producer: Pyo Min-soo
- Running time: 48 minutes

Original release
- Network: tvN
- Release: 31 October – 20 December 2011

Related
- Flower Band; Flower Boys Next Door; Dating Agency: Cyrano

Cool Guys, Hot Ramen (Korean: 꽃미남 라면가게; RR: Kkonminam Ramyeongage; lit. 'Flower Boy Ramen Shop') is a 2011 South Korean romantic comedy television series, starring Jung Il-woo, Lee Chung-ah, Lee Ki-woo, Park Min-woo, and Cho Yoon-woo. It aired on cable channel tvN from October 31 to December 20, 2011, on Wednesdays and Thursdays at 23:00 (KST) for 16 episodes.

The series is the first installment of "Oh! Boy" series by tVN of Flower Boy programming targeted at the teenage demographic, and was followed by Flower Band in 2012, then Flower Boys Next Door and Dating Agency: Cyrano in 2013.

== Synopsis ==
Yang Eun-bi (Lee Chung-ah), a university student in her mid-20s, prepares for her civil service exam with the dream of being a high school teacher. She accidentally encounters Cha Chi-soo (Jung Il-woo), the arrogant heir to the biggest food conglomerate in South Korea. Eun-bi is initially attracted to Chi-soo until she finds out that he is only a high school senior, causing her to dislike him. On the other hand, Chi-soo becomes fascinated with her because she is outspoken and athletic, unlike the other women he knows. However, Chi-soo does not interpret his fascination as romantic interest, as he is out of her league and he usually only loves self-interested girls like Yoon So-yi, a ballet student now dating Chi-soo's rebellious classmate, Kim Ba-wool. Eun-bi resists her attraction in turn, believing Chi-soo is only toying with her. Eun-bi is looking for a more serious relationship, after being dumped by a cheating ex-boyfriend while waiting for him to complete his mandatory military service. She frequently turns to her dating-savvy roommate/ex-high school volleyball teammate Kang Dong-joo for advice.

After Eun-bi's father (Jung In-gi) passes away, she is surprised to find out that he has left his ramen restaurant to Choi Kang-hyuk (Lee Ki-woo), whom he had helped when the latter was a troubled youngster, instead of to her. It is soon revealed that Eun-bi's father did this in the hope that Kang-hyuk and Eun-bi would marry. Eun-bi, after losing her student-teaching assignment because of her conflicts with Chi-soo, starts to work at the ramen shop along with homeless fellow students, Kim Ba-wool (Park Min-woo) and Woo Hyun-woo (Cho Yoon-woo). Chi-soo also wants to work at the restaurant to get over his growing obsession with Eun-bi. Knowing that he and Chi-soo actually share the same mother, Kang-hyuk allows him to join the shop out of concern for his cold half-brother.

Kang-hyuk quickly develops feelings for Eun-bi, but she finds herself more attracted to the passionate Chi-soo. After many misunderstandings, Chi-soo realizes that his obsession with Eun-bi is actually attraction, and competes for Eun-bi's affections with Kang-hyuk. However, Chi-soo's father (Joo Hyun) disapproves. Chi-soo's (and Kang-hyuk's) mother had also been an average (not rich) woman, and Chi-soo's father believes that difference was one of the reasons for their separation several years ago. The company of Chi-soo's father is planning to redevelop the area in which the ramen shop is located, so he tries to use the possible destruction of the ramen shop as leverage to keep Eun-bi and Chi-soo apart. Chi-soo has become attached to the ramen shop, and afraid of being disowned, he initially chooses to stay with his father. At the end, Chi-soo visits Eun-bi after he has completed his two-year service in the South Korean Army without contacting her.

== Cast ==
=== Main ===
- Jung Il-woo as Cha Chi-soo
- Lee Chung-ah as Yang Eun-bi
- Lee Ki-woo as Choi Kang-hyuk
- Park Min-woo as Kim Ba-wool
- Cho Yoon-woo as Woo Hyun-woo

=== Supporting ===
- Kim Ye-won as Kang Dong-joo
- Ho Soo as Yoon So-yi
- Joo Hyun as Cha Ok-gyun
- Han Ji-wan as Joo Ya-soo
- Jung In-gi as Yang Chul-dong
- Seo Bum-suk as Director Ko
- Song Jae-rim as Hee-gon
- Kim Il-woong as Jung-gu
- Kim Hye-soo as fortuneteller (cameo, ep. 1)
- Gong Hyo-jin as record store clerk (cameo, ep. 9)

== Production ==
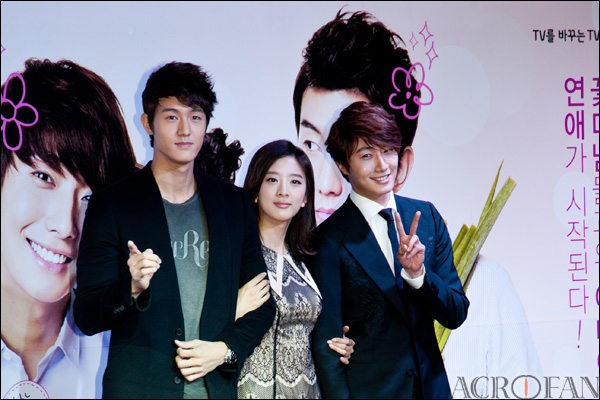
The cast of the series at a press conference

The series was directed by Jung Jun-hwa, who previously helmed the 2008 film Lost and Found (also known as Sweet Lie). It was produced by Pyo Min-soo, along with the production crew of 2009 KBS drama Boys over Flowers.

Filming commenced on September 21, 2011, with Jung Il-woo playing Cha Chi-soo, and his friends at a cafe in Hongdae.

== Reception ==
According to AGB Nielsen Media, the November 7 episode received a viewership rating of 2.07 percent, the highest rating in its timeslot, thus the most-watched cable program for the second week in a row. It also recorded a 200 percent increase in viewership from the previous episode among 20 to 49-year-old men. It was reported as the most-viewed show among women in their teens to 30s, as well as among men in their teens to 20s. The series was watched by one in three teenage girls with 30 percent audience shares, and in Busan, it recorded five percent in viewership ratings. At its peak, the series scored viewership ratings in the four percent range, the highest ratings amongst its cable competitors in the same timeslot for eight weeks.

Its popularity spawned a webcomic version of the show, taking off from characters Ba-wool and Hyun-woo as 20-year-old men managing a ramen restaurant. The cartoon has had over 1.8 million page views since its release on online portal Nate, with the number of visitors increasing by an average 32 percent per day.

== Ratings ==
In this table, the blue numbers represents the lowest ratings and the red numbers represents the highest ratings.

| Ep. | Original broadcast date | Average audience share |
| Ep. | Original broadcast date | AGB Nielsen |
| Ep. | Original broadcast date | Nationwide |
|---|---|---|
| 1 | October 31, 2011 | 1.19% |
| 2 | November 1, 2011 | 1.45% |
| 3 | November 7, 2011 | 2.07% |
| 4 | November 8, 2011 | 2.85% |
| 5 | November 14, 2011 | 2.80% |
| 6 | November 15, 2011 | 3.22% |
| 7 | November 21, 2011 | 3.60% |
| 8 | November 22, 2011 | 3.00% |
| 9 | November 28, 2011 | 3.20% |
| 10 | November 29, 2011 | 2.94% |
| 11 | December 5, 2011 | 2.83% |
| 12 | December 6, 2011 | 3.26% |
| 13 | December 12, 2011 | 2.32% |
| 14 | December 13, 2011 | 2.40% |
| 15 | December 19, 2011 | 2.85% |
| 16 | December 20, 2011 | 3.54% |
| Average | | 2.72% |

- This drama airs on a cable channel/pay TV which normally has a relatively smaller audience compared to free-to-air TV/public broadcasters (KBS, SBS, MBC and EBS).

== International broadcast ==
- In November 2011, after being on air for eight episodes, the series was sold to Japanese content distribution company Culture Convenience Club at a record price of US$100,000 per episode. It premiered on Mnet Japan in January 2012, with reruns on terrestrial network TBS from June 12 to July 11, 2012.
- It was aired on Mnet's Channel M in March 2014.
- It premiered in the Philippines on TeleAsia Chinese on June 20, 2014. It also aired on TV5 from July 7 to August 22, 2014 under its alternate title Cool Guys, Hot Ramen. It is also being re-aired by TV5 every Sunday nights starting November 8, 2015.
- In Thailand, it was aired on Workpoint TV on October 22, 2013.
