= AM302 =

Studio album by Lee Hong-gi
- Released: December 9, 2015
- Length: 31:50
- Language: Japanese
- Label: Warner Music Japan

Lee Hong-gi chronology
FM302 (2015)	AM302 (2015)	Do n Do (2018)

Singles from AM302
- 1. "モノローグ (Monologue)" Released: November 12, 2015

AM302 is the debut Japanese-language studio album from South Korean singer Lee Hong-gi, the main singer of the band F.T. Island. It was released on December 9, 2015, by Warner Music Japan. The album is the Japanese version of Lee Hong-gi's previous Korean-language album FM302, and it includes Japanese versions of five songs from that album in addition to three new Japanese songs. The album features the lead single "モノローグ (Monologue)".

== Background and release ==
The album was announced on November 12, 2015. A release date of December 9, 2015, was later confirmed by FNC Entertainment. The name AM302 is a combination of the AM radio frequency and Lee Hong-gi's birthday, which is March 2. The radio concept is supposed to reflect the idea that the album contains various genres of music that people can listen to at any time, much like a radio.

The lead single "モノローグ (Monologue)" was arranged by Lee Hong-gi himself, who also considered doing the song with the full F.T. Island band. The theme of the song is parting with a lover, and Billboard Japan characterized the song as painful, sad, or heartbreaking (切ない). KpopStarz described the song as a "sad ballad". The music video for "モノローグ (Monologue)" was released on November 12, 2015 (JST).

To promote the album, Lee Hong-gi held the LEE HONG GI 1st Solo Concert「Merry 302 MHz」 at Pacifico Yokohama in Yokohama from December 16–17 and at Grand Cube Osaka in Osaka from December 24–25.

== Track listing ==
CD
No.	Title	Length
1.	"モノローグ" (Monoroogu / Monologue)	3:55
2.	"Anywhere"	4:15
3.	"Let's Seize the Day"	3:25
4.	"Kings for a Day"	3:20
5.	"Be Your Doll"	3:08
6.	"LOL (Loudness of Love)"	3:49
7.	"비가 와요 (雨が降ります)" (Biga Wayo [Ame Ga Orimasu] / In the Rain)	5:14
8.	"Miss X-Mas"	4:41
Total length:		31:50

DVD
No.	Title	Length
1.	"モノローグ ＜Music Video＞" (Monologue [Music Video])	4:07
2.	"モノローグ ＜Studio Session＞" (Monologue [Studio Session])	4:02
3.	"モノローグ ＜The Making Of -モノローグ-＞" (Monologue [The Making Of "Monologue"])	10:45

== Charts ==
Chart (2018)	Peak position
Japan Weekly Albums (Oricon)	6
Japan Hot Albums (Billboard)	10
