= Park Min-woo (actor) =

South Korean actor

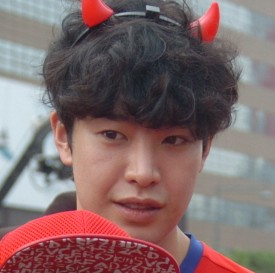
- Park in 2014
- Born: March 22, 1988 (age 38); Daejeon, South Korea
- Education: Kookmin University - Theater and Film
- Occupation: Actor
- Years active: 2011–2017

Korean name
- Hangul: 박민우
- Hanja: 朴敏雨
- RR: Bak Minu
- MR: Pak Minu

Park Min-woo (born March 22, 1988) is a South Korean actor. He made his official acting debut with his supporting role in the romantic comedy series Cool Guys, Hot Ramen (2011). He has since continued to appear in television dramas, such as I Need a Fairy (2012), Play Guide (2013), and Modern Farmer (2014).

Park is also one of the cast members on reality/variety show Roommate, which began airing in 2014.

He enlisted in the military September 29, 2016. A source reveals that it was decided he would serve as part of public interest service personnel for health reasons. After his entrance to the Nonsan training camp on the 29th, the actor trained for four weeks and rendered 23 months of social rather than military service.

He was involved in an accident while riding his motorcycle near the Donghodaegyo Bridge in March 2018. He then underwent a major surgery and was in the intensive care unit. In mid-2021 his father reported he'd "been looking after Min Woo at home for about three years now," who required long-term home care and was using a wheelchair.

== Filmography ==
=== Film ===
Year	Title	Role	Notes
2016	Mood of the Day	Kang Jin-chul	

=== Television series ===
Year	Title	Role	Network
2011	My Princess	bit part	MBC
2011	Cool Guys, Hot Ramen	Kim Ba-wool	tvN
2012	Sent from Heaven	Cha Kook-min	KBS2
2013	Play Guide	Park Min-woo	tvN
2013	The Virus	Bong Sun-dong	OCN
2013	The Scandal	Batman	MBC
2014	Can We Fall in Love, Again?	Choi Yoon-seok	jTBC
2014	Flower Grandpa Investigation Unit	young Han Won-bin	tvN
2014	Modern Farmer	Kang Hyeok	SBS
2015	Love Detective Sherlock K	Do Min-woo	KBS1/Naver TV Cast
2016	Come Back Mister	Yoo Hyuk	SBS
2016	Happy Home	Lee Kang-min	MBC

=== Variety show ===
Year	Title	Notes
2012	Style Log	
2014–2015	Roommate	Cast member

=== Music video appearances ===
Year	Song title	Artist
2010	"Going Home"	Kim Yoon-ah
2014	"Day 1"	K.Will
