= Seonjaryeong =

Mountain in South Korea

Coordinates: 37°43′N 128°45′E

Highest point
- Elevation: 1,157 m (3,796 ft)

Geography
- Location: South Korea
- Parent range: Baekdu-daegan

Korean name
- Hangul: 선자령
- Hanja: 仙子嶺
- RR: Seonjaryeong
- MR: Sŏnjaryŏng

Seonjaryeong (Korean: 선자령) is a mountain in Pyeongchang County and Gangneung, Gangwon Province, South Korea. It has an elevation of 1,157 m (3,796 ft).

== See also ==
- List of mountains in Korea
