= Omniscient Interfering View =

South Korean TV program

- Also known as: The Manager
- Hangul: 전지적 참견 시점
- Hanja: 全知的 參見 視點
- RR: Jeonjijeok chamgyeon sijeom
- MR: Chŏnjijŏk ch'amgyŏn sichŏm
- Genre: Reality television Observational Talk show
- Country of origin: South Korea
- Original language: Korean
- No. of episodes: 425 + 2 pilot (list of episodes)

Production
- Production locations: South Korea, Japan, Canada, Singapore
- Camera setup: Multi-camera
- Running time: 80–90 minutes
- Production company: MBC

Original release
- Network: MBC
- Release: 10 March 2018 – present

Omniscient Interfering View (Korean: 전지적 참견 시점) is a South Korean television entertainment program, distributed and syndicated by MBC on Saturdays at 11:05 pm (KST) since 10 March 2018.

== Synopsis ==
Omniscient Interfering View is an observational entertainment show that uses a documentary style techniques to observe the life of the cast members, invited guests and their managers. The show follows another program, I Live Alone of a similar format, which airs on the same channel on Fridays at the same time slot.

Similar program, On & Off, produced by tvN is a show of personal documentary, where celebrities share their "On" (busy working daily life) and/or "Off" (private/at home) moments of their lives.

== History ==
Between episode 1 and 10, the cast members, a behavioral analysis expert, and occasionally guests, watch the videos in a studio setting and provide commentary.

From episode 11 onward, the format has changed slightly to invite guests with their managers. There are no restrictions on the guest's occupation. The cast members and invited guests watch the videos as they observe and comment on the life of the invited guests and their managers. Occasionally the cast members and their managers are also observed and commented.

== Airtime ==
Airdate	Broadcast Start Time (KST)	
10 March 2018 – 26 June 2021	Part 1	Saturdays 11:05 pm
10 March 2018 – 26 June 2021	Part 2	Sundays 12:05 am
3 July 2021 – present	Saturdays 11:10 pm	

== Cast ==
=== Pilot episode ===
For the two pilot episodes aired on 29 and 30 November 2017, the cast consisted of Jun Hyun-moo, Lee Young-ja, Song Eun-i, Yang Se-hyung, Seo Min (parasite doctor), Lee Jai-jin and Yang Jae-woong (psychiatrist). Seo Min and Lee Jai-jin were replaced by the time the show started its proper run.

=== Current cast/interferer ===
Name	Duration	Manager	Notes
Jun Hyun-moo 전현무	Ep. 1 – present	Han Jae-sung	Han Jae-sung debuts in the 2018 MBC Entertainment Awards interview for Jun Hyun-moo's Entertainer of the Year Award on 29 December 2018.
Lee Young-ja 이영자	Ep. 1 – present	Song Sung-ho (Director)	Song Sung-ho debuts in the pilot episodes as Lee Young-ja's 31st manager. Song was promoted to Chief in episode 87, and was promoted to Director in episode 328. Song will occasionally appear as Lee Young-ja's manager.
Lee Young-ja 이영자	Ep. 1 – present	Lee Seok-min (probationary manager)	Lee Seok-min debuts in episode 39.
Lee Young-ja 이영자	Ep. 1 – present	Sagong Min (team leader)	Sagong Min debuts in episode 103 as Lee Young-ja's 32nd manager.
Lee Young-ja 이영자	Ep. 1 – present	Park Dong-ok (manager)	Park Dong-ok debuts in episode 230 as Lee Young-ja's youngest manager.
Song Eun-i 송은이	Ep. 1 – present	Park Jong-hoon	Park Jong-hoon debuts in episode 9.
Song Eun-i 송은이	Ep. 1 – present	Kim Han-hee	Kim Han-hee debuts in episode 58 during the show's MT tour.
Song Eun-i 송은이	Ep. 1 – present	Kim Do-hyung	Kim Do-hyung debuts in episode 321.
Yang Se-hyung 양세형	Ep. 1 – present	Kim Jae-seung	Kim Jae-seung debuts in episode 39.
Yang Se-hyung 양세형	Ep. 1 – present	Kim Hyeon-ung	Kim Hyeon-ung debuts in episode 362.
Yoo Byung-jae 유병재	Ep. 1 – present	Yoo Gyu-seon	Yoo Gyu-seon debuts in episode 1.
Hong Hyun Hee 홍현희	Ep. 75 – present	Park Chan-yeol	Park Chan-yeol was Hyun-hee's manager between episodes 75 – 114.
Hong Hyun Hee 홍현희	Ep. 75 – present	Yeon Je-seung	Yeon Je-seung is the temporary manager between episodes 115 – 131 after Hong Hyun-hee joined a new agency.
Hong Hyun Hee 홍현희	Ep. 75 – present	Hwang Jeong-chul	Hwang Jeong-chul was Hyun-hee's manager between episodes 132 – 192.
Hong Hyun Hee 홍현희	Ep. 75 – present	—	No information on the manager between episodes 194 – 199.
Hong Hyun Hee 홍현희	Ep. 75 – present	Cho Nam-hyun	Cho Nam-hyun was Hyun-hee's manager between episodes 200 – 228. Hong Hyun-hee was away from the show between episodes 210 – 217 for giving birth to her son.
Hong Hyun Hee 홍현희	Ep. 75 – present	Park Jun-young	Park Jun-young was Hyun-hee's manager between episode 229 – 266.
Hong Hyun Hee 홍현희	Ep. 75 – present	Kwak Sang-won	Kwak Sang-won is Hyun-hee's current manager since episode 267.

=== Former cast/interferer ===
Name	Duration	Manager	Notes
Kim Saeng-min 김생민	Ep. 1 – 4	Hwang Su-min	Left the show following a news story about him harassing two female staff members at a party in 2008. Saeng-min apologized to the female staff members, and left all of his current programs.
Lee Sang-eun 이상은	Ep. 1 – 10	—	Behavioural analysis specialist. Participates in the show only as an observer, to provide input on body language and behaviour.

== Long-term guest appearances ==
List of long-term guests since episode 11.

=== Current ===
None

=== Former ===
Name	Episode		Manager	Notes
Name	Protagonist	Guest Interferer	Manager	Notes
Shin Hyun-joon	11 – 12	13 – 25	Lee Kwan-yong	—
Park Sung-kwang	13 – 14	15 – 52	Im Song (Former)	Park Sung-kwang left the show after Im Song quit as his manager.
Park Sung-kwang	237	99 – 100, 236	—	—
Lee Seung-yoon	28 – 29	30 – 40, 43 – 60	Kang Hyun-seok (Former)	Kang Hyun-seok got caught up in controversy over loaned money that he failed to repay. He resigned and they left the show.
Lee Seung-yoon	127 – 128, 140 – 141, 175 – 176	166	Kim Hoon-kyu	—
Kim Dong-hyun	60 – 62	63 – 67	Jung Yoo-seok	—

== Episodes ==
Year	Number of Episodes	Air Date	
Year	Number of Episodes	First aired	Last aired
2018	34	10 March 2018	22 December 2018
2019	50	5 January 2019	28 December 2019
2020	50	4 January 2020	12 December 2020
2021	49	9 January 2021	18 December 2021
2022	45	8 January 2022	24 December 2022
2023	51	7 January 2023	30 December 2023
2024	48	6 January 2024	28 December 2024
2025	51	4 January 2025	27 December 2025
2026	47	3 January 2026	TBA
Total	425		

=== 2018 ===
List of episodes in 2018 (1–34)

Ep #	Air Date	Celebrity Appearances	Remarks	Ref
0	29 & 30 November 2017; 3 March 2018	Cast members: Lee Young-ja, Jeon Hyun-moo, Song Eun-i, Kim Saeng-min, Yang Se-hyeong and Lee Jae-jin. Manager appearance: Song Sung-ho (Lee Young-ja's manager); Observers: Seo-min and Yang Jae-woong (Note: psychiatrist)	—	

Ep #	Air Date	Studio Guest(s)	Protagonist(s)	Guest Interferer(s)	Manager Appearance(s)	Remarks	Ref
1	10 March	Yang Jae-woong; Lee Sang-eun (Note: Behavioural analysis specialist)	Lee Young-ja; Kim Saeng-min; Yoo Byung-jae	Yang Jae-woong; Lee Sang-eun	Song Sung-ho (Lee Young-ja's manager); Hwang Su-min (Kim Saeng-min's manager); Yoo Gyu-seon (Yoo Byung-jae's manager)	—	
2	17 March	Yang Jae-woong; Lee Sang-eun	Lee Young-ja; Yoo Byung-jae	Yang Jae-woong; Lee Sang-eun	Song Sung-ho (Lee Young-ja's manager); Yoo Gyu-seon (Yoo Byung-jae's manager)	—	
3	24 March	Lee Won-il; Lee Sang-eun	Lee Young-ja; Kim Saeng-min	Lee Won-il	Song Sung-ho (Lee Young-ja's manager); Hwang Su-min (Kim Saeng-min's manager)	Brief appearance by Park Sung-kwang.	
4	31 March	Lee Won-il; Lee Sang-eun	Lee Young-ja; Yoo Byung-jae	Lee Won-il	Song Sung-ho (Lee Young-ja's manager); Yoo Gyu-seon (Yoo Byung-jae's manager)	Kim Saeng-min's last appearance on the show.	
5	7 April	Nam Sang-il; Lee Sang-eun	Yoo Byung-jae; Lee Young-ja	Nam Sang-il; Lee Sang-eun	Yoo Gyu-seon (Yoo Byung-jae's manager); Song Sung-ho (Lee Young-ja's manager)	Brief appearances by Hong Jin-young, Kim Soo-yong & Jo Se-ho. (Note: via phone); Following his harassment controversy, Kim Saeng-min left the show. He was edited out of this episode, and is only visible in wide shots from the studio.	
6	14 April	Hong Jin-young; Kim Soo-yong; Lee Sang-eun	Yoo Byung-jae; Hong Jin-young	Kim Soo-yong; Lee Sang-eun	Yoo Gyu-seon (Yoo Byung-jae's manager); Kim Tae-hyeok (Hong Jin-young's manager)	Brief appearance by Moon Sang-hoon. (Note: A friend of Yoo Byung-jae)	
7	21 April	Hong Jin-young; Kim Soo-yong; Lee Sang-eun	Hong Jin-young	Kim Soo-yong; Lee Sang-eun	Kim Tae-hyeok (Hong Jin-young's manager)	Brief appearances by Min Kyung-hoon, Bong Gu (Gil Gu Bong Gu) & Huh Gak.	
7	21 April	Kim Soo-yong; Park Ji-hoon (Note: attorney); Lee Sang-eun	Lee Young-ja; Yoo Byung-jae	Kim Soo-yong; Park Ji-hoon; Lee Sang-eun	Song Sung-ho (Lee Young-ja's manager); Yoo Gyu-seon (Yoo Byung-jae's manager)	—	
8	28 April	Kim Soo-yong; Park Ji-hoon; Lee Sang-eun	Lee Young-ja; Yoo Byung-jae	Kim Soo-yong; Park Ji-hoon; Lee Sang-eun	Song Sung-ho (Lee Young-ja's manager); Yoo Gyu-seon (Yoo Byung-jae's manager)	—	
9	5 May	Hong Jin-kyung; Han Hye-yeon; Lee Sang-eun	Song Eun-i; Lee Young-ja	Hong Jin-kyung; Han Hye-yeon; Lee Sang-eun	Park Jong-hoon (Song Eun-i's manager); Song Sung-ho (Lee Young-ja's manager)	Brief appearances of Celeb Five, Kim Won-hee, Kim Yong-man.	
The program halted its broadcast (12 May – 23 June) following a controversial clip used in the episode on 5 May that used news footage from the Sewol ferry disaster for comedic purposes.
10	30 June	Hong Jin-kyung; Han Hye-yeon; Lee Sang-eun	Yoo Byung-jae; Lee Young-ja	Hong Jin-kyung; Han Hye-yeon; Lee Sang-eun	Yoo Gyu-seon (Yoo Byung-jae's manager); Song Sung-ho (Lee Young-ja's manager)	—	

Ep #	Air Date	Studio Guest(s)	Protagonist(s)	Guest Interferer(s)	Manager Appearance(s)	Remarks	Ref
11	7 July	Shin Hyun-joon	Shin Hyun-joon	Yeo Esther (Note: nutritionist and doctor of preventive medicine); Yang Jae-woong	Lee Kwan-yong (Shin Hyun-joon's manager); Song Sung-ho (Lee Young-ja's manager)	—	
12	14 July	Shin Hyun-joon	Shin Hyun-joon	Yeo Esther; Yang Jae-woong	Lee Kwan-yong (Shin Hyun-joon's manager); Song Sung-ho (Lee Young-ja's manager)	—	
13	21 July	Park Sung-kwang; Shin Hyun-joon	Park Sung-kwang; Lee Young-ja	Yang Jae-woong	Im Song (Park Sung-kwang's manager); Song Sung-ho (Lee Young-ja's manager)	—	
14	28 July	Park Sung-kwang; Shin Hyun-joon	Park Sung-kwang; Lee Young-ja	Yang Jae-woong	Im Song (Park Sung-kwang's manager); Song Sung-ho (Lee Young-ja's manager)	—	
15	4 August	Park Sung-kwang; Shin Hyun-joon	Park Sung-kwang; Shin Hyun-joon; Lee Young-ja	Park Youn-hee (Note: fashion designer)	Im Song (Park Sung-kwang's manager); Lee Kwan-yong (Shin Hyun-joon's manager); Song Sung-ho (Lee Young-ja's manager)	—	
16	11 August	Park Sung-kwang; Shin Hyun-joon	Park Sung-kwang; Shin Hyun-joon; Lee Young-ja	Park Youn-hee	Im Song (Park Sung-kwang's manager); Lee Kwan-yong (Shin Hyun-joon's manager); Song Sung-ho (Lee Young-ja's manager)	Brief appearance of Lee Young-ja receiving awards at the Brand of the Year 2018 Awards Ceremony.	
17	18 August	Lee Su-hyun (AKMU); Shin Hyun-joon; Park Sung-kwang	Shin Hyun-joon; Lee Young-ja; Yoo Byung-jae; Lee Su-hyun; Park Sung-kwang	—	Lee Kwan-yong (Shin Hyun-joon's manager); Song Sung-ho (Lee Young-ja's manager); Yoo Gyu-seon (Yoo Byung-jae's manager); Im Song (Park Sung-kwang's manager)	—	
18	25 August	Lee Su-hyun (AKMU); Shin Hyun-joon; Park Sung-kwang	Shin Hyun-joon; Lee Young-ja; Yoo Byung-jae; Lee Su-hyun; Park Sung-kwang	—	Lee Kwan-yong (Shin Hyun-joon's manager); Song Sung-ho (Lee Young-ja's manager); Yoo Gyu-seon (Yoo Byung-jae's manager); Im Song (Park Sung-kwang's manager)	—	
No broadcast on 1 September due to 2018 Asian Games Live telecast of Japan vs South Korea Finals soccer match.
19	8 September	Sunmi; Oh Nami; Shin Hyun-joon; Park Sung-kwang	Park Sung-kwang; Sunmi; Lee Young-ja	Oh Nami (Note: Stand-in for Song Eun-i); Shin Hyun-joon	Im Song (Park Sung-kwang's manager); Lee Hae-ju (Sunmi's manager); Song Sung-ho (Lee Young-ja's manager)	Song Eun-i is absent due to schedule conflict with Busan International Comedy Festival filming.	
20	15 September	Sunmi; Oh Nami; Shin Hyun-joon; Park Sung-kwang	Park Sung-kwang; Sunmi; Lee Young-ja	Oh Nami; Shin Hyun-joon	Im Song (Park Sung-kwang's manager); Lee Hae-ju (Sunmi's manager); Song Sung-ho (Lee Young-ja's manager)	Song Eun-i is absent due to schedule conflict with Busan International Comedy Festival filming.	
21	22 September	Crush; Shin Hyun-joon; Park Sung-kwang	Park Sung-kwang; Shin Hyun-joon; Crush	—	Im Song (Park Sung-kwang's manager); Lee Kwan-yong (Shin Hyun-joon's manager); Kim Hyun-soo (Crush's manager)	—	
22	29 September	Crush; Shin Hyun-joon; Park Sung-kwang	Park Sung-kwang; Shin Hyun-joon; Crush	—	Im Song (Park Sung-kwang's manager); Lee Kwan-yong (Shin Hyun-joon's manager); Kim Hyun-soo (Crush's manager)	—	
23	6 October	Shim Hyung-tak; Shin Hyun-joon; Park Sung-kwang	Shim Hyung-tak; Park Sung-kwang; Yoo Byung-jae	Shin Hyun-joon	Hwang Won-taek (Shim Hyung-tak's manager); Im Song (Park Sung-kwang's manager); Yoo Gyu-seon (Yoo Byung-jae's manager)	—	
24	13 October	Shim Hyung-tak; Shin Hyun-joon; Park Sung-kwang	Shim Hyung-tak; Park Sung-kwang; Yoo Byung-jae	Shin Hyun-joon	Hwang Won-taek (Shim Hyung-tak's manager); Im Song (Park Sung-kwang's manager); Yoo Gyu-seon (Yoo Byung-jae's manager)	—	
25	20 October	Shim Hyung-tak; Shin Hyun-joon; Park Sung-kwang	Shim Hyung-tak; Park Sung-kwang; Yoo Byung-jae	Shin Hyun-joon	Hwang Won-taek (Shim Hyung-tak's manager); Im Song (Park Sung-kwang's manager); Yoo Gyu-seon (Yoo Byung-jae's manager)	—	
26	27 October	WINNER (Mino & Jinwoo); Park Sung-kwang	Mino; Lee Young-ja; Park Sung-kwang	Jinwoo	Yoo Si-mon (Mino's Manager); Song Sung-ho (Lee Young-ja's manager); Im Song (Park Sung-kwang's manager)	—	
27	3 November	WINNER (Mino & Jinwoo); Park Sung-kwang	Mino; Lee Young-ja; Park Sung-kwang	Jinwoo	Yoo Si-mon (Mino's Manager); Song Sung-ho (Lee Young-ja's manager); Im Song (Park Sung-kwang's manager)	—	
28	10 November	Jung Hyung-suk (Note: voice actor); Lee Seung-yoon; Park Sung-kwang	Park Sung-kwang; Lee Young-ja; Lee Seung-yoon	Jung Hyung-suk	Im Song (Park Sung-kwang's manager); Song Sung-ho (Lee Young-ja's manager); Kang Hyun-seok (Lee Seung-yoon's manager)	Brief appearances of Park Sung-kwang, Im Song and Gwang-Bok (Note: Park Sung-kwang's pet) in KBS' Gag Concert.	
29	17 November	Jung Hyung-suk; Lee Seung-yoon; Park Sung-kwang	Park Sung-kwang; Lee Young-ja; Lee Seung-yoon	Jung Hyung-suk	Im Song (Park Sung-kwang's manager); Song Sung-ho (Lee Young-ja's manager); Kang Hyun-seok (Lee Seung-yoon's manager)	—	
30	24 November	Lee Seung-yoon; Yura (Girl's Day); Park Sung-kwang	Park Sung-kwang; Lee Young-ja; Lee Seung-yoon	Yura	Im Song (Park Sung-kwang's manager); Song Sung-ho (Lee Young-ja's manager); Kang Hyun-seok (Lee Seung-yoon's manager)	—	
31	1 December	Lee Seung-yoon; Yura (Girl's Day); Park Sung-kwang	Park Sung-kwang; Lee Young-ja; Lee Seung-yoon	Yura	Im Song (Park Sung-kwang's manager); Song Sung-ho (Lee Young-ja's manager); Kang Hyun-seok (Lee Seung-yoon's manager)	—	
32	8 December	Song Kyung-a; Park Sung-kwang; Lee Seung-yoon	Lee Seung-yoon; Yoo Byung-jae; Lee Young-ja	Park Sung-kwang; Song Kyung-a	Kang Hyun-seok (Lee Seung-yoon's manager); Yoo Gyu-seon (Yoo Byung-jae's manager); Song Sung-ho (Lee Young-ja's manager)	Yoo Byung-jae and Yoo Gyu-seon visit to Matsuyama and Cat Island in Aoshima (Japan)	
33	15 December	Song Kyung-a; Park Sung-kwang; Lee Seung-yoon	Lee Seung-yoon; Yoo Byung-jae; Lee Young-ja	Park Sung-kwang; Song Kyung-a	Kang Hyun-seok (Lee Seung-yoon's manager); Yoo Gyu-seon (Yoo Byung-jae's manager); Song Sung-ho (Lee Young-ja's manager)	Yoo Byung-jae and Yoo Gyu-seon visit to Matsuyama and Cat Island in Aoshima (Japan)	
34	22 December	Hwang Kwanghee (ZE:A); Park Sung-kwang; Lee Seung-yoon	Hwang Kwanghee; Park Sung-kwang	Lee Seung-yoon	Yoo Si-jong (Hwang Kwanghee's manager); Im Song (Park Sung-kwang's manager)	Hwang Kwanghee's first variety show appearance since formally discharged from the military.	
No broadcast on 29 December due to 2018 MBC Entertainment Awards Live telecast.

=== 2019 ===
List of episodes in 2019 (35–84)

Ep #	Air Date	Studio Guest(s)	Protagonist(s)	Guest Interferer(s)	Manager Appearance(s)	Remarks	Ref
35	5 January	—	Park Sung-kwang; Lee Seung-yoon; Jun Hyun-moo; Lee Young-ja; Song Eun-i; Yang Se-hyung; Yoo Byung-jae; Song Sung-ho (Note: Lee Young-ja's manager as special guest)	—	Im Song (Park Sung-kwang's manager); Kang Hyun-seok (Lee Seung-yoon's manager); Yoo Gyu-seon (Yoo Byung-jae's manager); Han Jae-sung (Jun Hyun-moo's manager)	2018 MBC Entertainment Awards Special	
36	12 January	—	Park Sung-kwang; Lee Seung-yoon; Jun Hyun-moo; Lee Young-ja; Song Eun-i; Yang Se-hyung; Yoo Byung-jae; Song Sung-ho	—	Im Song (Park Sung-kwang's manager); Kang Hyun-seok (Lee Seung-yoon's manager); Yoo Gyu-seon (Yoo Byung-jae's manager); Han Jae-sung (Jun Hyun-moo's manager)	2018 MBC Entertainment Awards Special	
36	12 January	Hwang Kwanghee (ZE:A); Park Sung-kwang; Lee Seung-yoon	Hwang Kwanghee; Lee Seung-yoon	Park Sung-kwang	Yoo Si-jong (Hwang Kwanghee's manager); Kang Hyun-seok (Lee Seung-yoon's manager)	—	
37	19 January	Byul; Park Sung-kwang; Lee Seung-yoon	Byul; Lee Seung-yoon	Park Sung-kwang	Lee Jae-hyung (Byul's manager); Kang Hyun-seok (Lee Seung-yoon's manager)	Brief appearance by Haha. (Note: Byul's husband)	
38	26 January	Byul; Park Sung-kwang; Lee Seung-yoon	Lee Seung-yoon; Park Sung-kwang	Byul	Kang Hyun-seok (Lee Seung-yoon's manager); Im Song (Park Sung-kwang's manager)	—	
39	2 February	Kim Soo-yong; Park Sung-kwang; Lee Seung-yoon	Kim Soo-yong; Lee Young-ja	Lee Seung-yoon; Park Sung-kwang	Choi Dong-chan, Cho Jang-wan, Lee Gyu-in & Kim Jae-seung (Kim Soo-yong's rotation managers) (Note: Kim Soo-yong does not have a fixed manager. Choi Dong-chan is Lee Yoon-seok's manager, Cho Jang-wan is Kim Gook-jin's manager, Lee Gyu-in is Yoon Jung-soo's manager & Kim Jae-seung is Yang Se-hyung's manager.); Song Sung-ho & Lee Seok-min (Lee Young-ja's managers)	Lee Seok-min is Lee Young-ja's probationary manager.	
40	9 February	Kim Soo-yong; Park Sung-kwang; Lee Seung-yoon	Lee Young-ja; Park Sung-kwang	Park Sung-kwang; Lee Seung-yoon; Kim Soo-yong	Im Song (Park Sung-kwang's manager); Song Sung-ho & Lee Seok-min (Lee Young-ja's managers)	—	
41	16 February	Seventeen (Seungkwan & Mingyu); Park Sung-kwang	Park Sung-kwang; Lee Young-ja	Seungkwan; Mingyu	Im Song (Park Sung-kwang's manager); Song Sung-ho (Lee Young-ja's manager)	Brief appearance by Jung Woo-sung.	
42	23 February	Seventeen (Seungkwan & Mingyu); Park Sung-kwang	Seventeen (all 13 members); Park Sung-kwang	—	Jeon Young-hwan (Seventeen's manager); Im Song (Park Sung-kwang's manager)	—	
43	2 March	Claudia Kim; Park Sung-kwang; Lee Seung-yoon	Claudia Kim	Park Sung-kwang; Lee Seung-yoon	Shim Jung-soo (Claudia Kim's manager)	Lee Seung-yoon is back in the studio as interferer.; The cast also celebrates the 1st anniversary of the show since debut.	
43	2 March	Kim Soo-yong; Park Sung-kwang; Lee Seung-yoon	Managers' MT Tour: (Note: 5 managers gathered for a one-day MT Tour to Gapyeong); Yoo Gyu-seon (Yoo Byung-jae's manager); Kang Hyun-seok (Lee Seung-yoon's manager); Im Song (Park Sung-kwang's manager); Lee Kwan-yong (Shin Hyun-joon's manager); Lee Seok-min (Lee Young-ja's probationary manager)	Park Sung-kwang; Lee Seung-yoon; Kim Soo-yong	—	Lee Seung-yoon is back in the studio as interferer.; The cast also celebrates the 1st anniversary of the show since debut.	
44	9 March	Kim Soo-yong; Park Sung-kwang; Lee Seung-yoon	Managers' MT Tour: Yoo Gyu-seon (Yoo Byung-jae's manager); Kang Hyun-seok (Lee Seung-yoon's manager); Im Song (Park Sung-kwang's manager); Lee Kwan-yong (Shin Hyun-joon's manager); Lee Seok-min (Lee Young-ja's probationary manager)	Park Sung-kwang; Lee Seung-yoon; Kim Soo-yong	—	Kim Jae-seung (Yang Se-hyung's manager) & Kim Soo-yong joined the 5 managers for the barbecue.	
44	9 March	Claudia Kim; Park Sung-kwang; Lee Seung-yoon	Claudia Kim	Park Sung-kwang; Lee Seung-yoon	Shim Jung-soo (Claudia Kim's manager)	—	
45	16 March	Yoo Jae-hwan; Park Sung-kwang; Lee Seung-yoon	Yoo Jae-hwan; Lee Seung-yoon	Park Sung-kwang	Kim Mi-hwan (Yoo Jae-hwan's manager); Kang Hyun-seok (Lee Seung-yoon's manager)	—	
45	16 March	Park Sung-kwang; Lee Seung-yoon	Managers' MT Tour: Yoo Gyu-seon (Yoo Byung-jae's manager); Kang Hyun-seok (Lee Seung-yoon's manager); Im Song (Park Sung-kwang's manager); Lee Kwan-yong (Shin Hyun-joon's manager); Lee Seok-min (Lee Young-ja's probationary manager); Kim Jae-seung (Yang Se-hyung's manager); Kim Soo-yong	Park Sung-kwang; Lee Seung-yoon	—	—	
46	23 March	Yoo Jae-hwan; Park Sung-kwang; Lee Seung-yoon	Lee Seung-yoon; Yoo Jae-hwan	Park Sung-kwang	Kang Hyun-seok (Lee Seung-yoon's manager); Kim Mi-hwan (Yoo Jae-hwan's manager)	—	
47	30 March	Lee Yong-jin; Park Sung-kwang; Lee Seung-yoon	Lee Seung-yoon; Lee Yong-jin	Park Sung-kwang	Kang Hyun-seok (Lee Seung-yoon's manager); Park Yi-Re (Lee Yong-jin's manager)	—	
48	6 April	Lee Yong-jin; Park Sung-kwang; Lee Seung-yoon	Lee Seung-yoon; Lee Yong-jin	Park Sung-kwang	Kang Hyun-seok (Lee Seung-yoon's manager); Park Yi-Re (Lee Yong-jin's manager)	—	
49	13 April	Lee Chung-ah; Park Sung-kwang; Lee Seung-yoon	Lee Chung-ah; Lee Seung-yoon	Park Sung-kwang	Ahn Woo-yong (Lee Chung-ah's manager); Kang Hyun-seok (Lee Seung-yoon's manager)	—	
50	20 April	Lee Chung-ah; Park Sung-kwang; Lee Seung-yoon	Lee Seung-yoon; Park Sung-kwang	Lee Chung-ah	Kang Hyun-seok (Lee Seung-yoon's manager); Im Song (Park Sung-kwang's manager)	—	
51	27 April	Ra Mi-ran; Cha Jung-won; Park Sung-kwang; Lee Seung-yoon	Lee Seung-yoon; Ra Mi-ran	Park Sung-kwang; Cha Jung-won	Kang Hyun-seok (Lee Seung-yoon's manager); Lee Na-ra (Ra Mi-ran's manager)	Ra Mi-ran appears as a guest and stand-in for Song Eun-i who is performing with Celeb Five in Australia for Melbourne International Comedy Festival.	
52	4 May	Ra Mi-ran; Cha Jung-won; Park Sung-kwang; Lee Seung-yoon	Ra Mi-ran; Cha Jung-won	Park Sung-kwang; Lee Seung-yoon	Lee Na-ra (Ra Mi-ran's manager); Kim Yoo-jae (Cha Jung-won's manager)	Ra Mi-ran appears as a guest and stand-in for Song Eun-i who is performing with Celeb Five in Australia for Melbourne International Comedy Festival.	
53	11 May	Cha Jung-won; Kang Min-kyung (Davichi); Lee Seung-yoon	Yang Se-hyung; Cha Jung-won; Kang Min-kyung	Lee Seung-yoon	Byun Jin-soo (Yang Se-hyung's stylist); Kim Yoo-jae (Cha Jung-won's manager)	—	
54	18 May	Cha Jung-won; Kang Min-kyung (Davichi); Lee Seung-yoon	Yang Se-hyung; Lee Young-ja	Lee Seung-yoon; Cha Jung-won; Kang Min-kyung	Byun Jin-soo (Yang Se-hyung's stylist); Song Sung-ho (Lee Young-ja's manager)	Brief appearance of Im Song (Park Sung-kwang's manager)	
—	No broadcast on 25 May 2019 due to 2019 FIFA U-20 World Cup match between Portugal & South Korea						
55	1 June	Kim Soo-yong; Sejeong (Gugudan); Lee Seung-yoon	Lee Young-ja; Yoo Byung-jae; Kim Soo-yong	Lee Seung-yoon; Sejeong	Song Sung-ho (Lee Young-ja's manager); Yoo Gyu-seon (Yoo Byung-jae's manager)	—	
56	8 June	Kim Soo-yong; Sejeong (Gugudan); Lee Seung-yoon	Lee Young-ja; Yoo Byung-jae; Kim Soo-yong	Lee Seung-yoon; Sejeong	Song Sung-ho (Lee Young-ja's manager); Yoo Gyu-seon (Yoo Byung-jae's manager)	—	
56	8 June	Chungha; Song Ga-in; Lee Seung-yoon	Chungha; Lee Seung-yoon	Song Ga-in	Ryu Jin-ah (Chungha's manager); Kang Hyun-seok (Lee Seung-yoon's manager)	Lee Seung-yoon & Kang Hyun-seok visited Canada for a magazine photo shoot (part 1).	
—	No broadcast on 15 June 2019 due to 2019 FIFA U-20 World Cup match between Ukraine & South Korea						
57	22 June	Chungha; Song Ga-in; Lee Seung-yoon	Chungha; Lee Seung-yoon	Song Ga-in	Ryu Jin-ah (Chungha's manager); Kang Hyun-seok (Lee Seung-yoon's manager)	Part 2 of Lee Seung-yoon & Kang Hyun-seok in Canada.; Kang Hyun-seok's final appearance in the show.; Preview of cast members' preparation for their MT outing.	
58	29 June	Ahn Young-mi (Celeb Five); Hwang Je-sung; Lee Seung-yoon	Omniscient Interfering View MT outing: Lee Young-ja; Jun Hyun-moo; Song Eun-i; Yoo Byung-jae; Yang Se-hyung; Lee Seung-yoon	Ahn Young-mi; Hwang Je-sung	Song Sung-ho (Lee Young-ja's manager); Woo Ho-Rim (Jun Hyun-moo's hair stylist); Kim Han-hee (Song Eun-i's manager); Yoo Gyu-seon (Yoo Byung-jae's manager); Choi Dong-chan (manager for various comedians)	Part 3 of Lee Seung-yoon & Kang Hyun-seok in Canada.; Kang Hyun-seok will be edited out from this episode and is only visible in wide shots.	
59	6 July	Ahn Young-mi (Celeb Five); Hwang Je-sung; Lee Seung-yoon	Omniscient Interfering View MT outing: Lee Young-ja; Jun Hyun-moo; Song Eun-i; Yoo Byung-jae; Yang Se-hyung; Lee Seung-yoon	Ahn Young-mi; Hwang Je-sung	Song Sung-ho (Lee Young-ja's manager); Woo Ho-Rim (Jun Hyun-moo's hair stylist); Kim Han-hee (Song Eun-i's manager); Yoo Gyu-seon (Yoo Byung-jae's manager); Choi Dong-chan (manager for various comedians)	Kang Hyun-seok will be edited out from this episode and is only visible in wide shots.	
59	6 July	Ahn Young-mi (Celeb Five); Hwang Je-sung; Lee Seung-yoon	Hwang Je-sung	Ahn Young-mi	Choi Gun-woo (Hwang Je-sung's manager)	—	
60	13 July	Ahn Young-mi (Celeb Five); Kim Dong-hyun; Lee Seung-yoon	Omniscient Interfering View MT outing: Lee Young-ja; Jun Hyun-moo; Song Eun-i; Yoo Byung-jae; Yang Se-hyung; Lee Seung-yoon	Ahn Young-mi; Kim Dong-hyun	Song Sung-ho (Lee Young-ja's manager); Woo Ho-Rim (Jun Hyun-moo's hair stylist); Kim Han-hee (Song Eun-i's manager); Yoo Gyu-seon (Yoo Byung-jae's manager); Choi Dong-chan (manager for various comedians)	Kang Hyun-seok will be edited out from this episode and is only visible in wide shots.; Lee Seung-yoon's last appearance as long term guest.	
61	20 July	Kim Dong-hyun; Kim Sook; Park Jin-joo	Kim Dong-hyun; Park Jin-joo	Kim Sook	Jung Yoo-seok (Kim Dong-hyun's manager); Seo Chang-il (Park Jin-joo's manager)	—	
62	27 July	Kim Dong-hyun; Kim Sook; Park Jin-joo	Kim Dong-hyun; Park Jin-joo	Kim Sook	Jung Yoo-seok (Kim Dong-hyun's manager); Seo Chang-il (Park Jin-joo's manager)	—	
63	3 August	Kim Ho-young; Oh Dae-hwan; Kim Dong-hyun	Lee Young-ja; Oh Dae-hwan	Kim Dong-hyun; Kim Ho-young	Song Sung-ho (Lee Young-ja's manager); Kim Tae-hoon (Oh Dae-hwan's manager)	—	
64	10 August	Kim Ho-young; Oh Dae-hwan; Kim Dong-hyun	Oh Dae-hwan; Kim Dong-hyun	Kim Ho-young	Kim Tae-hoon (Oh Dae-hwan's manager); Jung Yoo-seok (Kim Dong-hyun's manager)	—	
65	17 August	Shin Bong-sun (Celeb Five); Jang Sung-kyu; Kim Dong-hyun	Horror Special: Jun Hyun-moo; Yoo Byung-jae; Yang Se-hyung; Kim Dong-hyun	Shin Bong-sun; Jang Sung-kyu	Yoo Gyu-seon (Yoo Byung-jae's manager); Jung Yoo-seok (Kim Dong-hyun's manager)	In the Horror Special, the cast members, guest and their managers will enter the Haunted path and house to test their courage.; Kim Dong-hyun & Jung Yoo-seok (Team 1); Jun Hyun-moo & Yang Se-hyung (Team 2); Yoo Byung-jae & Yoo Gyu-seon (Team 3)	
65	17 August	Shin Bong-sun (Celeb Five); Jang Sung-kyu; Kim Dong-hyun	Jang Sung-kyu	Shin Bong-sun	Kim Yong-woon (Jang Sung-kyu's manager)	—	
66	24 August	Shin Bong-sun (Celeb Five); Jang Sung-kyu; Kim Dong-hyun	Jang Sung-kyu; Shin Bong-sun	Kim Dong-hyun	Kim Yong-woon (Jang Sung-kyu's manager); Song Eun-i (as Shin Bong-sun's one day manager)	—	
67	31 August	Shin Bong-sun (Celeb Five); Jang Sung-kyu; Kim Dong-hyun	Shin Bong-sun	Jang Sung-kyu	Song Eun-i (as Shin Bong-sun's one day manager)	—	
67	31 August	Song Ga-in; Tei; Oh Dae-hwan	Oh Dae-hwan; Tei	Song Ga-in	Kim Tae-hoon (Oh Dae-hwan's manager); Cho Chan-hyeong (Tei's manager)	—	
68	7 September	Song Ga-in; Tei; Oh Dae-hwan	Oh Dae-hwan; Tei	Song Ga-in	Kim Tae-hoon (Oh Dae-hwan's manager); Cho Chan-hyeong (Tei's manager)	—	
69	14 September	Oh Dae-hwan; Song Ga-in; Ddotty	Song Ga-in; Ddotty	Oh Dae-hwan	Yoo Gyu-seon (Ddotty's temporary manager); Kim Su-min (Song Ga-in's manager)	—	
70	21 September	Oh Dae-hwan; Song Ga-in; Ddotty	Song Ga-in; Ddotty	Oh Dae-hwan	Yoo Gyu-seon (Ddotty's temporary manager); Kim Su-min (Song Ga-in's manager)	—	
71	28 September	Shin Bong-sun (Celeb Five); Ha Dong-kyun (Wanted); Yoo Jae-hwan	Yoo Jae-hwan	Shin Bong-sun; Ha Dong-kyun	—	—	
71	28 September	Ha Dong-kyun (Wanted); Oh Dae-hwan; Song Ga-in	Oh Dae-hwan	Ha Dong-kyun; Song Ga-in	Kim Tae-hoon (Oh Dae-hwan's manager)	—	
72	5 October	Ha Dong-kyun (Wanted); Shin Bong-sun (Celeb Five); Yoo Jae-hwan	Ha Dong-kyun; Lee Young-ja; Yoo Byung-jae; Yang Se-hyung	Shin Bong-sun; Yoo Jae-hwan	Bae Won-ho (Ha Dong-kyun's manager); Song Sung-ho (Lee Young-ja's manager); Yoo Gyu-seon (Yoo Byung-jae's manager)	—	
73	12 October	Jang Sung-kyu; Ha Dong-kyun (Wanted); Tei	Jang Sung-kyu; Ha Dong-kyun; Tei	—	Kim Yong-woon (Jang Sung-kyu's manager); Bae Won-ho (Ha Dong-kyun's manager); Cho Chan-hyeong (Tei's manager)	—	
73	12 October	Jang Sung-kyu; Ha Dong-kyun (Wanted); Tei	Jang Sung-kyu; Ha Dong-kyun; Tei	—	Kim Yong-woon (Jang Sung-kyu's manager); Bae Won-ho (Ha Dong-kyun's manager); Cho Chan-hyeong (Tei's manager)	—	
74	19 October	Jang Sung-kyu; Ha Dong-kyun (Wanted); Tei	Tei; Ha Dong-kyun	Jang Sung-kyu	Cho Chan-hyeong (Tei's manager); Bae Won-ho (Ha Dong-kyun's manager)	—	
75	26 October	P.O (Block B); Oh Dae-hwan	P.O; Hong Hyun-hee; Oh Dae-hwan	—	Lee Kyu-hwan (P.O's manager); Park Chan-yeol (Hong Hyun-hee's manager); Kim Tae-hoon (Oh Dae-hwan's manager)	—	
76	2 November	P.O (Block B); Oh Dae-hwan	Oh Dae-hwan; Hong Hyun Hee	P.O	Kim Tae-hoon (Oh Dae-hwan's manager); Park Chan-yeol (Hong Hyun-hee's manager)	—	
77	9 November	Shin Bong-sun (Celeb Five); Hyojung (Oh My Girl); Tei	Shin Bong-sun; Song Eun-i; Tei; Lee Young-ja	Hyojung	Cho Chan-hyeong (Tei's manager); Song Sung-ho (Lee Young-ja's manager); Song Eun-i (Shin Bong Sun's manager)	—	
78	16 November	Shin Bong-sun (Celeb Five); Hyojung (Oh My Girl); Tei	Shin Bong-sun; Song Eun-i; Tei; Lee Young-ja	Hyojung	Cho Chan-hyeong (Tei's manager); Song Sung-ho (Lee Young-ja's manager); Song Eun-i (Shin Bong Sun's manager)	—	
79	23 November	Jang Sung-kyu; Yeon Je-seung (Note: Hong Hyun-hee's husband)	Jang Sung-kyu; Lee Young-ja	Yeon Je-seung	Kim Yong-woon (Jang Sung-kyu's manager); Song Sung-ho (Lee Young-ja's manager)	—	
80	30 November	Jang Sung-kyu; Yeon Je-seung	Hong Hyun Hee; Jang Sung-kyu	Yeon Je-seung	Park Chan-yeol (Hong Hyun-hee's manager); Kim Yong-woon (Jang Sung-kyu's manager)	—	
81	7 December	Brian Joo (Fly to the Sky); Hwang Min-hyun (NU'EST)	Lee Young-ja; Hong Hyun-hee	Brian Joo; Hwang Min-hyun	Song Sung-ho & Lee Seok-Min (Lee Young-ja's managers); Park Chan-yeol (Hong Hyun-hee's manager)	—	
82	14 December	Brian Joo (Fly to the Sky); Hwang Min-hyun (NU'EST)	Brian Joo; Lee Young-ja	Hwang Min-hyun	Hong Seung-ran (Brian Joo's manager); Song Sung-ho & Lee Seok-Min (Lee Young-ja's managers)	—	
83	21 December	Song Ga-in; AOA (Shin Ji-min & Kim Seol-hyun)	AOA; Song Ga-in; Lee Young-ja	—	Kim Hye-rim (AOA's manager); Kim Su-min (Song Ga-in's manager); Song Sung-ho & Lee Seok-Min (Lee Young-ja's managers)	—	
84	28 December	Song Ga-in; AOA (Shin Ji-min & Kim Seol-hyun)	Song Ga-in; AOA	—	Kim Su-min (Song Ga-in's manager); Kim Hye-rim (AOA's manager)	—	

=== 2020 ===
List of episodes in 2020 (85–134)

Ep #	Air Date	Studio Guest(s)	Protagonist(s)	Guest Interferer(s)	Manager Appearance(s)	Remarks	Ref
85	4 January	Song Ga-in; AOA (Shin Ji-min & Kim Seol-hyun)	Song Ga-in	Shin Ji-min & Kim Seol-hyun	Kim Su-min (Song Ga-in's manager)	—	
85	4 January	Bae Jong-ok; Chu Dae-yeob (Note: a.k.a. Kapichu)	Hong Hyun Hee	Bae Jong-ok; Kapichu	Park Chan-yeol (Hong Hyun-hee's manager)	2019 MBC Entertainment Awards special.	
86	11 January	Bae Jong-ok; Chu Dae-yeob	Bae Jong-ok; Kapichu; Yoo Byung-jae	—	Kim Young-gyu (Bae Jong-ok's manager); Yoo Gyu-seon (Yoo Byung-jae's manager)	—	
87	18 January	Hani (EXID); Song Ga-in	Hani; Lee Young-ja	Song Ga-in	Park Myeong-woo (Hani's manager); Song Sung-ho (Lee Young-ja's manager)	Song Sung-ho promoted to become Chief.	
88	25 January	Hani (EXID); Song Ga-in	Song Ga-in; Hong Hyun-hee	Hani	Kim Su-min (Song Ga-in's manager); Park Chan-yeol (Hong Hyun-hee's manager)	—	
89	1 February	Brian Joo (Fly to the Sky); Chae Yeon	Brian Joo; Hong Hyun Hee; Yeon Je-seung	Chae Yeon	Hong Seung-ran (Brian Joo's manager); Park Chan-yeol (Hong Hyun-hee's manager)	—	
90	8 February	Brian Joo (Fly to the Sky); Chae Yeon	Yang Se-chan; Yang Se-hyung; Hong Hyun-hee; Yeon Je-seung	Brian Joo; Chae Yeon	Byun Jin-soo (Yang Se-hyung's stylist); Park Chan-yeol (Hong Hyun-hee's manager)	—	
91	15 February	Sechs Kies (Eun Ji-won & Jang Su-won)	Yang Se-chan; Yang Se-hyung; Sechs Kies (Eun Ji-won, Lee Jai-jin, Kim Jae-duck & Jang Su-won)	—	Byun Jin-soo (Yang Se-hyung's stylist); Kim Sae-ho (Sechs Kies' manager)	—	
92	22 February	Eun Ji-won (Sechs Kies); Cho Myung-sub	Cho Myung-sub	Eun Ji-won	Song Sung-ho (Cho Myung-sub's manager)	—	
92	22 February	Sechs Kies (Eun Ji-won & Jang Su-won)	Sechs Kies (Eun Ji-won, Lee Jai-jin, Kim Jae-duck & Jang Su-won); Cho Myung-sub	—	Kim Sae-ho (Sechs Kies' manager)	—	
93	29 February	Yang Dong-geun; Jang Sung-kyu	Yang Dong-geun; Jang Sung-kyu; Jun Hyun-Moo	—	Alex Won Jong-han (Yang Dong-geun's manager); Kim Yong-woon (Jang Sung-kyu's manager)	—	
94	7 March	Yang Dong-geun; Jang Sung-kyu	Yang Dong-geun; Hong Hyun Hee	Jang Sung-kyu	Alex Won Jong-han (Yang Dong-geun's manager); Park Chan-yeol (Hong Hyun-hee's manager)	—	
95	14 March	Ha Dong-kyun (Wanted); Kim Shin-young (Celeb Five); Ong Seong-wu	Ha Dong-kyun; Kim Shin-young	Ong Seong-wu	Bae Won-ho (Ha Dong-kyun's manager); Jeong Kyu-seung (Kim Shin-young's manager)	—	
96	21 March	Ha Dong-kyun (Wanted); Kim Shin-young (Celeb Five); Ong Seong-wu	Ong Seong-wu; Kim Shin-young	Ha Dong-kyun	Son Chang-beom (Ong Seong-wu's manager); Jeong Kyu-seung (Kim Shin-young's manager)	—	
97	28 March	Ha Seung-jin; Cho Myung-sub	Hong Hyun-hee; Cho Myung-sub	Ha Seung-jin	Park Chan-yeol (Hong Hyun-hee's manager); Song Sung-ho (Cho Myung-sub's manager)	—	
98	4 April	Ha Seung-jin; Cho Myung-sub	Hong Hyun Hee; Ha Seung-jin	Cho Myung-sub	Park Chan-yeol (Hong Hyun-hee's manager); Lee Chung-hoon (Ha Seung-jin's manager)	—	
99	11 April	Bong Tae-gyu; Shin Bong-sun (Celeb Five); Park Sung-kwang	Bong Tae-gyu; Lee Young-ja; Jun Hyun-moo	Shin Bong-sun; Park Sung-kwang	Shim Jong-oh (Bong Tae-gyu's manager); Lee Seong-chul (Bong Tae-gyu's stylist)	Lee Young-ja act as Jun Hyun-moo's manager for a day.	
100	18 April	Bong Tae-gyu; Shin Bong-sun (Celeb Five); Park Sung-kwang	Song Eun-i; Shin Bong-sun; Kim Shin-young; Yoo Jae-hwan	Bong Tae-gyu; Park Sung-kwang	Jeong Kyu-seung (Kim Shin-young's manager); Kim Han-hee (Song Eun-i's manager)	"CEO Song's Employees, Episode 1, Noisy Workshop"; The show celebrates its 100th episode special with special appearance of Im Song (Park Sung-kwang's former manager).	
100	18 April	Bong Tae-gyu; Shin Bong-sun (Celeb Five); Park Sung-kwang	Lee Young-ja; Jun Hyun-moo	Bong Tae-gyu; Park Sung-kwang	—	Continuation of Lee Young-ja acting as manager of Jun Hyun-moo for a day.	
101	25 April	Jo Han-sun; Kim Shin-young (Celeb Five)	Song Eun-i; Shin Bong-sun; Kim Shin-young; Yoo Jae-hwan	Jo Han-sun	Jeong Kyu-seung (Kim Shin-young's manager); Kim Han-hee (Song Eun-i's manager)	"CEO Song's Employees, Episode 2, Noisy Workshop"	
101	25 April	Jo Han-sun; Kim Shin-young (Celeb Five)	Jo Han-sun	Kim Shin-young	Kim Byeong-Yeol (Jo Han-sun's manager)	—	
102	2 May	Jo Han-sun; Kim Shin-young (Celeb Five)	Yang Se-chan; Yang Se-hyung; Jo Han-sun	Kim Shin-young	Byun Jin-soo (Yang Se-hyung's stylist); Kim Byeong-Yeol (Jo Han-sun's manager)	—	
103	9 May	Paul Kim; Cho Myung-sub	Paul Kim; Lee Young-ja	Cho Myung-sub	Jin Young-min (Paul Kim's manager); Sagong Min (Lee Young-ja's 32nd manager)	Lee Young-ja's new manager (Sagong Min) debut.	
104	16 May	Paul Kim; Cho Myung-sub	Lee Young-ja; Cho Myung-sub	Paul Kim	Sagong Min (Lee Young-ja's manager); Song Sung-ho (Cho Myung-sub's manager)	—	
105	23 May	Lee Chan-won; Seo Eun-kwang (BtoB)	Seo Eun-kwang; Lee Chan-won	—	Kim Hyun-sung (BtoB's manager); Kim Hyo-min (Lee Chan-won's manager)	—	
106	30 May	Lee Chan-won; Seo Eun-kwang (BtoB)	Lee Chan-won; Hong Hyun Hee	Seo Eun-kwang	Kim Hyo-min (Lee Chan-won's manager); Park Chan-yeol (Hong Hyun-hee's manager)	—	
107	6 June	Kang Daniel; Lee Chan-won	Kang Daniel; Lee Chan-won	—	Jeong Dong-yun (Kang Daniel's manager); Kim Hyo-min (Lee Chan-won's manager)	—	
108	13 June	Kang Daniel; Lee Chan-won	Lee Chan-won; Hong Hyun Hee	Kang Daniel	Kim Hyo-min (Lee Chan-won's manager); Park Chan-yeol (Hong Hyun-hee's manager)	—	
109	20 June	Cho Myung-sub; Heo Kyung-hwan; Kim Ho-joong	Cho Myung-sub; Kim Ho-joong	Heo Kyung-hwan	Song Sung-ho (Cho Myung-sub's manager); Kim Nam-gi (Kim Ho-joong's manager)	—	
110	27 June	Cho Myung-sub; Heo Kyung-hwan; Kim Ho-joong	Heo Kyung-hwan; Kim Ho-joong	Cho Myung-sub	Jo Han-seok (Heo Kyung-hwan's manager); Kim Nam-gi (Kim Ho-joong's manager)	—	
111	4 July	Yoon Doo-joon (Highlight); Kim Shin-young (Celeb Five)	Yoon Doo-joon; Lee Young-ja	Kim Shin-young	Jin Ik-hyun (Yoon Doo-joon's manager); Jo Kyung-ho (Yoon Doo-joon's manager); Sagong Min (Lee Young-ja's manager)	—	
112	11 July	Yoon Doo-joon (Highlight); Kim Shin-young (Celeb Five)	Yoon Doo-joon; Kim Shin-young	—	Jin Ik-hyun (Yoon Doo-joon's manager); Jo Kyung-ho (Yoon Doo-joon's manager); Jeong Kyu-seung (Kim Shin-young's manager)	—	
113	18 July	Kim Shin-young (Celeb Five); Kim Na-young	Kim Shin-young; Kim Na-young	—	Jeong Kyu-seung (Kim Shin-young's manager); Kim Jung-min (Kim Na-young's manager)	—	
114	25 July	Kim Shin-young (Celeb Five); Kim Na-young	Kim Na-young	Kim Shin-young	Kim Jung-min (Kim Na-young's manager)	—	
114	25 July	Kim Na-young; Super Junior (Cho Kyu-hyun & Eunhyuk)	Cho Kyu-hyun; Eunhyuk	Kim Na-young	Won Yong-seon (Cho Kyu-hyun's manager)	—	
115	1 August	Uee; Kim Kang-hoon	Uee; Hong Hyun Hee	Kim Kang-hoon	Heo Young-do (Uee's manager); Yeon Je-seung (Hong Hyun-hee's temporary manager)	Yeon Je-seung as temporary manager for Hong Hyun-hee after joining a new agency.	
116	8 August	Uee; Kim Kang-hoon; Heo Kyung-hwan	Yoo Byung-jae; Kim Kang-hoon; Hong Hyun-hee	Uee; Heo Kyung-hwan	Yoo Gyu-seon (Yoo Byung-jae's manager); Yeon Je-seung (Hong Hyun-hee's temporary manager)	—	
117	15 August	Go Eun-ah; Jo Bin (Norazo); Heo Kyung-hwan	Go Eun-ah; Jo Bin	Heo Kyung-hwan	Bang Hyo-sun (Go Eun-ah's eldest sister and manager); Lee Hyun-ah (Norazo's stylist)	—	
118	22 August	Go Eun-ah; Jo Bin (Norazo); Heo Kyung-hwan	Go Eun-ah; Jo Bin	Heo Kyung-hwan	Bang Hyo-sun (Go Eun-ah's eldest sister and manager); Lee Hyun-ah (Norazo's stylist)	—	
119	29 August	Na Moon-hee; Super Junior (Cho Kyu-hyun & Shindong)	Cho Kyu-hyun; Shindong; Na Moon-hee	—	Won Yong-seon (Cho Kyu-hyun's manager); Jong Seon (Shindong's manager); Paeng Hyun-Seung (Na Moon-hee's manager)	—	
120	5 September	Super Junior (Cho Kyu-hyun, Eunhyuk & Donghae); Heo Kyung-hwan	Cho Kyu-hyun, Eunhyuk & Donghae; Heo Kyung-hwan	—	Won Yong-seon (Kyuhyun, Eunhyuk & Donghae's manager); Jo Han-seok (Heo Kyung-hwan's manager)	—	
121	12 September	Super Junior (Cho Kyu-hyun, Eunhyuk & Donghae); Heo Kyung-hwan	Cho Kyu-hyun, Eunhyuk & Donghae	Heo Kyung-hwan	Won Yong-seon (Kyuhyun, Eunhyuk & Donghae's manager)	—	
121	12 September	Jessi; Yoo Min-sang; Sleepy	Yoo Min-sang	Jessi; Sleepy	Ahn Hyeong-chan (Yoo Min-sang's manager); Oh Jong-min (Yoo Min-sang's stylist)	—	
122	19 September	Jessi; Yoo Min-sang; Sleepy	Jessi; Sleepy	Yoo Min-sang	Park Chan-hong (Jessi's manager)	—	
123	26 September	Jessi; Yoo Min-sang; Sleepy	Jessi	Yoo Min-sang; Sleepy	Park Chan-hong (Jessi's manager)	—	
123	26 September	Ji Hyun-woo; Go Eun-ah; Seunghee (Oh My Girl)	Seunghee	Ji Hyun-woo; Go Eun-ah	Park Yoon-hyuk Oh My Girl's manager)	—	
124	3 October	Ji Hyun-woo; Go Eun-ah; Seunghee (Oh My Girl)	Go Eun-ah; Ji Hyun-woo	Seunghee	Bang Hyo-sun (Go Eun-ah's eldest sister and manager); Kim Byung-seong (Ji Hyun-woo's manager)	Chuseok Special	
125	10 October	Ham Yeon-ji; Im Chang-jung	Lee Young-ja; Jun Hyun-moo; Yoo Byung-jae; Im Chang-jung	Ham Yeon-ji	Kim Joo-hwan (Im Chang-jung's manager)	Jun Hyun-moo & Yoo Byung-jae as Lee Young-ja's managers for a day.	
126	17 October	Ham Yeon-ji; Im Chang-jung	Lee Young-ja; Jun Hyun-moo; Yoo Byung-jae; Ham Yeon-ji	Im Chang-jung	Yoo Ha-Young (Ham Yeon-ji's partnership manager)	Continuation of Jun Hyun-moo & Yoo Byung-jae as Lee Young-ja's managers for a day.	
127	24 October	Yoo Min-sang; Lee Seung-yoon; Jeong Se-woon	Lee Seung-yoon	Yoo Min-sang; Jeong Se-woon	Kim Hoon-kyu (Lee Seung-yoon's manager)	—	
127	24 October	Yoo Min-sang; Lee Seung-yoon; Jeong Se-woon	Lee Young-ja; Jun Hyun-moo; Yoo Byung-jae	Yoo Min-sang; Lee Seung-yoon; Jeong Se-woon	—	Continuation of Jun Hyun-moo & Yoo Byung-jae as Lee Young-ja's managers for a day.	
128	31 October	Yoo Min-sang; Lee Seung-yoon; Jeong Se-woon	Lee Seung-yoon; Yoo Min-sang	Jeong Se-woon	Ahn Hyeong-chan (Yoo Min-sang's manager); Oh Jong-min (Yoo Min-sang's stylist); Kim Hoon-kyu (Lee Seung-yoon's manager)	—	
129	7 November	Ku Hye-sun; Na Tae-joo; Jonathan Yiombi	Ku Hye-sun; Na Tae-joo	Jonathan Yiombi	Kim Jae-young (Ku Hye-sun's manager); Kim Sung-hoon (Ku Hye-sun's agency CEO); Kim Han-sol (Na Tae-joo's manager)	—	
130	14 November	Ku Hye-sun; Na Tae-joo; Jo Bin (Norazo)	Jo Bin; Na Tae-joo	Ku Hye-sun	Lee Hyun-ah (Norazo's stylist); Kim Han-sol (Na Tae-joo's manager)	—	
131	21 November	Kim Sung-ryung; Lee Jun-young (U-KISS); Yeon Je-seung	Kim Sung-ryung; Lee Jun-young	Yeon Je-seung	Yoon Dae-hoon (Kim Sung-ryung's manager); Shim Hwa-seok (Lee Jun-young's manager)	—	
132	28 November	Kim Sung-ryung; Yeon Je-seung; Shownu (Monsta X)	Kim Sung-ryung; Hong Hyun Hee	Yeon Je-seung; Shownu	Yoon Dae-hoon (Kim Sung-ryung's manager); Hwang Jeong-chul (Hong Hyun-hee's new manager)	—	
133	5 December	Monsta X (Shownu & Joohoney)	Shownu & Joohoney	—	Park Joon-hyung & Seo Duk-joon (Monsta X's managers)	—	
133	5 December	Go Eun-ah; Lee Gi-kwang (Highlight)	Hong Hyun-hee	Go Eun-ah; Lee Gi-kwang	Hwang Jeong-chul (Hong Hyun-hee's manager)	—	
134	12 December	Go Eun-ah; Lee Gi-kwang (Highlight)	Hong Hyun-hee; Go Eun-ah	Lee Gi-kwang	Hwang Jeong-chul (Hong Hyun-hee's manager); Bang Hyo-sun (Go Eun-ah's eldest sister and manager)	—	
No broadcast on 19 & 26 December due to corona virus spread in broadcasting station.

=== 2021 ===
List of episodes in 2021 (135–183)

Ep #	Air Date	Studio Guest(s)	Protagonist(s)	Guest Interferer(s)	Manager Appearance(s)	Remarks	Ref
No broadcast on 2 January due to corona virus spread in broadcasting station.
135	9 January	Lee Si-young; Yoo Tae-oh; Jo Kwon (2AM)	Lee Si-young; Yoo Tae-oh	Jo Kwon	Park Yong-gyu (Lee Si-young's manager); Bae Chang-hyun (Yoo Tae-oh's manager)	—	
136	16 January	Oh Dae-hwan; Lee Si-young; Jo Kwon (2AM); Lee Sang-wook	Lee Si-young; Oh Dae-hwan	Jo Kwon; Lee Sang-wook	Park Yong-gyu (Lee Si-young's manager); Kim Tae-hoon (Oh Dae-hwan's manager)	—	
137	23 January	Moon So-ri; Lee Jun-young (U-KISS); Lee Guk-joo	Moon So-ri; Lee Jun-young	Lee Guk-joo	Park Joon-sik (Moon So-ri's manager); Shim Hwa-seok (Lee Jun-young's manager)	—	
138	30 January	Moon So-ri; Chuu (Loona); Lee Guk-joo	Moon So-ri; Hong Hyun Hee	Chuu; Lee Guk-joo	Park Joon-sik (Moon So-ri's manager); Hwang Jeong-chul (Hong Hyun-hee's manager)	—	
139	6 February	Yoon Eun-hye; Code Kunst; Nucksal	Yoon Eun-hye; Code Kunst	Nucksal	Moon Sang-min (Yoon Eun-hye's manager); Kang Hyun-soo (Code Kunst's manager)	—	
140	13 February	Lee Seung-yoon; Kang Daniel; Stephanie Lee	Lee Seung-yoon; Kang Daniel	Stephanie Lee	Kim Hoon-kyu (Lee Seung-yoon's manager); Jeong Dong-yun (Kang Daniel's manager)	—	
141	20 February	Lee Seung-yoon; Kang Daniel; Stephanie Lee	Lee Seung-yoon; Stephanie Lee	Kang Daniel	Kim Hoon-kyu (Lee Seung-yoon's manager); Lee Soo-ah (Stephanie Lee's manager)	—	
142	27 February	Rain; Jo Kwon (2AM); CNU (B1A4)	Rain; Jo Kwon	CNU	Bang Chul-min (Rain's manager); Jo Seong-Beom (Jo Kwon's manager)	—	
143	6 March	Rain; Chuu (Loona); Ahn Sung-joon	Rain; Ahn Sung-joon	Chuu	Bang Chul-min (Rain's manager); Kim Jong-deok (Ahn Sung-joon's manager)	—	
144	13 March	Super Junior (Leeteuk & Cho Kyu-hyun); Jackson (Got7)	Super Junior; Jackson	—	Won Yong-seon (Super Junior's manager); Lee Geon-woo (Jackson's manager)	—	
145	20 March	Super Junior (Leeteuk, Eunhyuk & Siwon)	Super Junior; Hong Hyun Hee	—	Won Yong-seon (Super Junior's manager); Hwang Jeong-chul (Hong Hyun-hee's manager)	—	
146	27 March	Kim Ok-vin; KCM; Lee Jin-ho	Kim Ok-vin; Hong Hyun-hee	KCM; Lee Jin-ho	Kim Ha-neul (Kim Ok-vin's manager); Hwang Jeong-chul (Hong Hyun-hee's manager)	—	
147	3 April	Kim Ok-vin; KCM; Yoon Ji-sung	Kim Ok-vin; KCM	Yoon Ji-sung	Kim Ha-neul (Kim Ok-vin's manager); Park Eun-ji (KCM's manager)	—	
148	10 April	Brave Girls (Minyoung & Yujeong); Yoo Min-sang	Brave Girls; Yoo Min-sang	—	Kim Yeong-cheon (Brave Girls' manager); Seo Eun-ho (Yoo Min-sang's manager); Oh Jong-min (Yoo Min-sang's styist)	—	
149	17 April	Brave Girls (Minyoung & Yujeong); Kim Yon-ja	Brave Girls; Kim Yon-ja	—	Kim Yeong-cheon (Brave Girls' manager); Yoo Joon-ho & Hong Jin-woo (Kim Yon-ja's managers)	—	
150	24 April	Lee Jin-ho; Song Kyung-a; KCM	Lee Jin-ho; Song Kyung-a	KCM	Oh Su-hwan (Lee Jin-ho's manager); Lee So-myuong (Song Kyung-a's manager)	—	
151	1 May	Lee Jin-ho; Highlight (Yoon Doo-joon & Son Dong-woon)	Lee Jin-ho; Highlight	—	Oh Su-hwan (Lee Jin-ho's manager); Jin Ik-hyun (Highlight's manager)	—	
152	8 May	Kim Shin-young (Celeb Five); Hong Seok-cheon; KCM	Kim Shin-young; KCM	Hong Seok-cheon	Jeong Kyu-Seung (Kim Shin-young's manager); Park Eun-ji (KCM's manager)	—	
153	15 May	Kim Shin-young (Celeb Five); Hong Seok-cheon; KCM	KCM; Hong Seok-cheon	Kim Shin-young	Park Eun-ji (KCM's manager); Ji Jun-bae (Hong Seok-cheon's manager)	—	
154	22 May	Lee Hong-gi (F.T. Island); Kim Yo-han (WEi); Eum Moon-suk	Eum Moon-suk; Hong Hyun Hee	Lee Hong-gi; Kim Yo-han	Kim Do-hyung (Eum Moon-suk's manager); Hwang Jeong-chul (Hong Hyun-hee's manager)	—	
155	29 May	Kim Yo-han (WEi); Eum Mun-seok; Hong Yoon-hwa	Kim Yo-han; Hong Hyun-hee	Eum Mun-seok; Hong Yoon-hwa	Jun Hong-bin (Kim Yo-han's manager); Hwang Jeong-chul (Hong Hyun-hee's manager)	—	
156	5 June	Sung Si-kyung; Soyou; Kim Nam-hee	Lee Young-ja; Soyou	Sung Si-kyung; Kim Nam-hee	Song Sung-ho (Lee Young-ja's manager); Lee Seung-gook (Soyou's manager)	Song Sung-ho returns as Lee Young-ja's manager.	
157	12 June	Sung Si-kyung; Solar (Mamamoo); Kim Nam-hee	Lee Young-ja; Kim Nam-hee	Solar	Song Sung-ho (Lee Young-ja's manager); Seok Hye-kyung (Kim Nam-hee's manager)	—	
158	19 June	Brave Girls (Minyoung & Eunji); Ahn Hyun-mo	Brave Girls; Ahn Hyun-mo	—	Kim Yeong-cheon (Brave Girls' manager); Kim Jun-Bae (Ahn Hyun-mo's manager)	—	
159	26 June	Brave Girls (Minyoung & Eunji); Defconn (Hyungdon and Daejun)	Brave Girls; Hyungdon and Daejun	—	Kim Yeong-cheon (Brave Girls' manager)	—	
160	3 July	Kim Ho-young; ITZY (Yeji & Yuna)	Kim Ho-young; ITZY & Kim Shin-young	—	Choi Beom-sung (Kim Ho-young's manager); Song Eun-i (DaViITZY's manager)	—	
161	10 July	Irene Kim; Defconn (Hyungdon and Daejun); Kim Ho-young	Irene Kim; Hyungdon and Daejun	Kim Ho-young	Jeong Ji-hye (Irene Kim's manager)	—	
162	17 July	Han Chae-young	Han Chae-young; Hong Hyun Hee	—	Lee Joong-hee (Han Chae-young's manager); Hwang Jeong-chul (Hong Hyun-hee's manager)	—	
163	24 July	Uhm Ji-won; Parc Jae-jung (MSG Wannabe)	Uhm Ji-won; Hong Hyun-hee	Parc Jae-jung	Jung Myung-soo (Uhm Ji-won's manager); Hwang Jeong-chul (Hong Hyun-hee's manager)	—	
No broadcast on 31 July due to live telecast of Tokyo Olympics.
164	7 August	Yoo Se-yoon; Kim Jae-hwa; Jeon So-mi	Kim Jae-hwa; Hong Hyun-hee	Yoo Se-yoon; Jeon So-mi	Lee Jae-deok (Kim Jae-hwa's manager); Hwang Jeong-chul (Hong Hyun-hee's manager)	—	
165	14 August	Jeon So-mi; Yoo Se-yoon; Sleepy	Jeon So-mi; Yoo Se-yoon	Sleepy	Choi Sun-ho (Jeon So-mi's manager); Yoo Se-yoon (Song Jin-woo's manager)	Yoo Se-yoon as manager for Song Jin-woo.	
166	21 August	Park Ha-sun; Wonstein (MSG Wannabe); Lee Seung-yoon	Park Ha-sun; Wonstein	Lee Seung-yoon	Kim Myung-hyun (Park Ha-sun's manager); Yoon Sung-mo (Wonstein's manager)	—	
167	28 August	Park Ha-sun; Se7en; Wonstein (MSG Wannabe)	Park Ha-sun; Se7en	Wonstein	Kim Myung-hyun (Park Ha-sun's manager); Kim Ik-hyun (Se7en's manager)	—	
168	4 September	Lee Kyu-hyung; Jang Young-ran; Kim Yong-myung	Lee Kyu-hyung; Kim Yong-myung	Jang Young-ran	Jung-Ji-soo (Lee Kyu-hyung's manager)	—	
169	11 September	Gong Myung; Kim Hee-jin	Gong Myung; Kim Hee-jin	—	Choi Dae-gyu (Gong Myung's manager); Lee In-hee (Kim Hee-jin's volleyball club manager)	—	
170	18 September	Gong Myung; Kim Hee-jin; Jo Bin (Norazo)	Gong Myung; Kim Hee-jin	Jo Bin	Choi Dae-gyu (Gong Myung's manager); Lee In-hee (Kim Hee-jin's volleyball club manager)	—	
171	25 September	Lee Soo-kyung; Kim Nam-gil; Park Seong-ho; Yoo Se-yoon	Lee Soo-kyung; Park Seong-ho	Yoo Se-yoon	Kim Nam-gil (Lee Soo-kyung's manager); Im Jae-baek (Park Seong-ho's manager)	Kim Nam-gil as Lee Soo-kyung's manager for a day.	
172	2 October	Yoo Se-yoon; Park Seong-ho; Song Jin-woo	Yoo Se-yoon; Song Jin-woo; Park Seong-ho	—	Yoo Se-yoon (Song Jin-woo's manager); Im Jae-baek (Park Seong-ho's manager)	Yoo Se-yoon as manager for Song Jin-woo.	
173	9 October	Jung Yong-hwa (CNBLUE); Yuk Jun-seo; Aiki (Hook)	Yuk Jun-seo; Aiki	Jung Yong-hwa	Park Hyun-jae (Yuk Jun-seo's manager); Yoon Ji-hee (Aiki's manager)	—	
174	16 October	Yuk Jun-seo; CNBLUE (Jung Yong-hwa & Lee Jung-shin)	Yuk Jun-seo; CNBLUE	—	Park Hyun-jae (Yuk Jun-seo's manager); Song Jung-jin (CNBLUE's manager)	—	
175	23 October	Wonstein (MSG Wannabe); Lee Seung-yoon; Heo Sung-tae	Wonstein; Lee Seung-yoon	Heo Sung-tae	Yoon Sung-mo (Wonstein's manager); Kim Hoon-kyu (Lee Seung-yoon's manager)	—	
176	30 October	Wonstein (MSG Wannabe); Lee Seung-yoon; Ahn Young-mi (Celeb Five)	Lee Seung-yoon; Ahn Young-mi	Wonstein	Kim Hoon-kyu (Lee Seung-yoon's manager); Song Eun-i (Ahn Young-mi's manager)	—	
177	6 November	Heo Sung-tae; PROWDMON (Monica & Lip J); Arin (Oh My Girl)	Monica; Lip J Heo Sung-tae	Arin	Lip J (Monica's manager); Park Ki-jung (Heo Sung-tae's manager)	—	
178	13 November	Heo Sung-tae; PROWDMON (Monica & Lip J); Arin (Oh My Girl)	Monica; Lip J Heo Sung-tae	Arin	Lip J (Monica's manager); Park Ki-jung (Heo Sung-tae's manager)	—	
179	20 November	Jonathan Yiombi; Jeong Dong-won; Yeon Je-seung	Jeong Dong-won; Hong Hyun Hee; Yeon Je-seung	Jonathan Yiombi	Kim Nam-gon (Jeong Dong-won's manager); Hwang Jeong-chul (Hong Hyun-hee's manager)	—	
180	27 November	Jonathan Yiombi; Yeon Je-seung	Jonathan Yiombi; Yoo Byung-jae; Hong Hyun-hee; Yeon Je-seung	—	Yoo Gyu-seon (Jonathan Yiombi & Yoo Byung-jae's manager); Hwang Jeong-chul (Hong Hyun-hee's manager)	—	
181	4 December	Lee Si-young; Lee Hak-joo; Lee Hong-gi (F.T. Island)	Lee Si-young; Lee Hak-joo	Lee Hong-gi	Park Yong-gyu (Lee Si-young's manager); Park Sang-gi (Lee Hak-joo's manager)	—	
182	11 December	Lee Si-young; F.T. Island (Lee Hong-gi & Lee Jae-jin); An Yu-jin (IVE)	Lee Si-young; F.T. Island	Lee Hak-joo; An Yu-jin	Park Yong-gyu (Lee Si-young's manager); Noh Hyung-gyu (F.T. Island's manager)	—	
183	18 December	Kim Sung-oh; Koo Ja-wook	Kim Sung-oh; Koo Ja-wook	—	Kim Sang-beom (Kim Sung-oh's manager); Kim Seok-min (Koo Ja-wook's off-season manager)	—	
No broadcast on 25 December due to Christmas movie special.

=== 2022 ===
List of episodes in 2022 (184–228)

Ep #	Air Date	Studio Guest(s)	Protagonist(s)	Guest Interferer(s)	Manager Appearance(s)	Remarks	Ref
No broadcast on 1 January due to New Year day movie special.
184	8 January	Lee Da-hae; Kwon Yul	Lee Da-hae; Kwon Yul	—	Kim Su-hyung (Lee Da-hae's manager); Lee Sang-jun (Kwon Yul's manager)	—	
185	15 January	Lee Da-hae; Giriboy	Lee Da-hae; Giriboy	—	Kim Su-hyung (Lee Da-hae's manager); Go Jun-hyuk (Giriboy's manager)	—	
186	22 January	Gabee (LACHICA); Jang Young-ran	Gabee; Jang Young-ran	—	Kim Yoo-min (LACHICA's manager); Kim Jun-soo (Jang Young-ran's manager)	—	
187	29 January	Jee Seok-jin; Jung Saem-mool; Kim Soo-yong	Jee Seok-jin & Kim Soo-yong; Jung Saem-mool	—	Kwak Sang-won (Jee Seok-jin's manager); Son Ju-hee (Jung Saem-mool's manager)	—	
No broadcast between 5 and 12 February due to telecast of 2022 Beijing Winter Olympics.
188	19 February	Kwon Yul; Seohyun (SNSD); Yeon Je-seung	Kwon Yul; Seohyun	Yeon Je-seung	Lee Sang-jun (Kwon Yul's manager); Choi Kang-ro (Seohyun's manager)	Seo Jang-hoon appeared as a stand-in host for Jun Hyun-moo and Yang Se-hyung as they were absent due to corona virus infection.	
189	26 February	Pak Se-ri; Lee Min-hyuk (BtoB)	Pak Se-ri; BtoB	—	Noh Joo-ae & Kim Hye-rin (Pak Se-ri's managers); Yoon Geun-soo & Kim Jung-woo (BtoB's managers)	—	
No broadcast on 5 March due to MBC special news on spread of wildfires.
190	12 March	Pak Se-ri; Lee Mu-jin; Kwon Yul	Pak Se-ri; Lee Mu-jin	Kwon Yul	Noh Joo-ae & Kim Hye-rin (Pak Se-ri's managers); Shin Dong-jin (Lee Mu-jin's manager)	—	
191	19 March	Jay Park; Song Yuqi ((G)I-dle)	Jay Park; Hong Hyun Hee	Song Yuqi	Kang Hyun-soo (Jay Park's manager); Hwang Jeong-chul (Hong Hyun-hee's manager)	—	
192	26 March	Jay Park pH-1	Jay Park; Hong Hyun Hee	pH-1	Kang Hyun-soo (Jay Park's manager); Hwang Jeong-chul (Hong Hyun-hee's manager)	Hwang Jeong-chul's last recording session as Hong Hyun-hee's manager.	
193	2 April	Son Yeon-jae; Mimi (Oh My Girl); Jonathan Yiombi	Son Yeon-jae; Jonathan Yiombi	Mimi	Kim Su-yeon (Son Yeon-jae's manager); Yoo Gyu-seon (Jonathan Yiombi & Yoo Byung-jae's manager)	Brief appearance by Patricia Yiombi. (Note: Jonathan Yiombi's younger sister)	
194	9 April	Yoon Park; Ive (An Yu-jin & Jang Won-young)	Yoon Park; Ive	—	Ji In-wook (Yoon Park's manager); Kim Do-jin (Ive's manager)	—	
195	16 April	Kwon Yul; Be'O; Bona (WJSN)	Kwon Yul; Be'O	Bona	Lee Seung-hyung (Kwon Yul's temporary manager); Lee Eun-ju (Be'O's manager); Ji Min-gyu & Park Hyun-soo (Be'O's neighbourhood managers)	—	
196	23 April	Joo Woo-jae; Nam Chang-hee; Jaechan (DKZ)	Joo Woo-jae; Lee Young-ja; Hong Jin-kyung	Nam Chang-hee; Jaechan	Jeon Sang-hyup (Joo Woo-jae's manager); Song Sung-ho (Lee Young-ja's manager); Lee Hyeok-gu (Hong Jin-kyung's manager)	Lee Young-ja and Hong Jin-kyung visit Jeju island for filming of Jin-kyung's Youtube channel and healing trip (part 1).	
197	30 April	Joo Woo-jae; Bae Jong-ok	Bae Jong-ok; Lee Young-ja; Hong Jin-kyung	Joo Woo-jae	Kim Young-gyu (Bae Jong-ok's manager); Song Sung-ho (Lee Young-ja's manager); Lee Hyeok-gu (Hong Jin-kyung's manager)	Part 2 of Jeju island healing trip.	
198	7 May	Kim Min-kyu; Kim Ho-young	Kim Min-kyu; Lee Young-ja; Hong Jin-kyung	Kim Ho-young	Yoo Yi-jun (Kim Min-kyu's manager); Song Sung-ho (Lee Young-ja's manager); Lee Hyeok-gu (Hong Jin-kyung's manager)	Part 3 of Jeju island healing trip.	
199	14 May	Kim Ho-young; Kim Min-kyu; Won Ji-min (CLASS:y)	Kim Ho-young; CLASS:y	Kim Min-kyu	Kim Kyung-Yeon (Kim Ho-young's temporary manager); Cho Yi-hyun (CLASS:y's CEO)	—	
200	21 May	Im Jeong-su (Note: a.k.a. Cheonan Fatty (Hong Hyun-hee's brother-in-law)); Kwon Yul; Patricia Yiombi	All cast members Patricia Yiombi; Jonathan Yiombi	Im Jeong-su; Kwon Yul	Cho Nam-hyun (Hong Hyun-hee's manager); Song Sung-ho (Lee Young-ja's manager); Yoo Gyu-seon (Jonathan Yiombi & Yoo Byung-jae's manager)	The show celebrates its 200th episode special with cast members planning and visiting Yeon Je-seung and Hong Hyun-hee's new house for housewarming party and baby shower.	
201	28 May	Im Jeong-su; Patricia Yiombi; Hyunjae (The Boyz)	All cast members Patricia Yiombi; Jonathan Yiombi	Im Jeong-su; Kwon Yul	Cho Nam-hyun (Hong Hyun-hee's manager); Song Sung-ho (Lee Young-ja's manager); Yoo Gyu-seon (Jonathan Yiombi & Yoo Byung-jae's manager)	The show celebrates its 200th episode special with cast members planning and visiting Yeon Je-seung and Hong Hyun-hee's new house for housewarming party and baby shower.	
202	4 June	Aiki (Hook); Cho Tae-kwan	Aiki; Cho Tae-kwan	—	Yoon Ji-hee (Aiki's manager); Choi Sung-Hwan (Cho Tae-kwan's manager)	—	
203	11 June	Aiki (Hook); Hyo Jin-choi (WANT); Jee Seok-jin	Jee Seok-jin; Aiki	Hyo Jin-choi	Kwak Sang-won (Jee Seok-jin's manager); Yoon Ji-hee (Aiki's manager)	—	
204	18 June	Uhm Hyun-kyung; Lee Mu-jin	Uhm Hyun-kyung; Lee Mu-jin	—	Shin Jae-hyuk (Uhm Hyun-kyung's manager); Shin Dong-jin (Lee Mu-jin's manager)	—	
205	25 June	Nayeon (Twice); Lee Mu-jin	Nayeon; Lee Mu-jin	—	Jang Jung-yoon (Nayeon's manager); Shin Dong-jin (Lee Mu-jin's manager)	—	
206	2 July	Jang Hyuk; Joon Park (g.o.d)	Jang Hyuk	Joon Park	Jeon Seung-bin (Jang Hyuk's manager)	—	
206	2 July	Song Ga-in; Aespa (Karina & Winter)	Song Ga-in	Karina & Winter	Yoon Jae-jong (Song Ga-in's manager)	—	
207	9 July	Song Ga-in; Aespa (Karina & Winter)	Aespa	Song Ga-in	Lee Seung-hee (Aespa's manager)	—	
207	9 July	Jang Hyuk; Joon Park (g.o.d)	Jang Hyuk	Joon Park	Jeon Seung-bin (Jang Hyuk's manager)	—	
208	16 July	Lee Chang-ho; Kwak Beom	Lee Chang-ho; Hong Hyun Hee	Kwak Beom	Han A-ram (Lee Chang-ho's manager); Hwang Jeong-chul (Hong Hyun-hee's former manager)	Hong Hyun-hee's prenatal trip to Jeju island with Yeon Je-seung and Hwang Jeong-chul. Special appearances by Lee Hyori and her husband, Lee Sang-soon.; Hong Hyun-hee's last appearance on the show.	
209	23 July	Jung Jae-hyung; Lee Jin-ah	Hong Hyun-hee; Jung Jae-hyung	Lee Jin-ah	Hwang Jeong-chul (Hong Hyun-hee's former manager); Kim Eun-joong (Jung Jae-hyung's manager)	Hong Hyun-hee's prenatal trip to Jeju island with Yeon Je-seung and Hwang Jeong-chul. Special appearances by Lee Hyori and her husband, Lee Sang-soon.; Hong Hyun-hee's last appearance on the show.	
210	30 July	Jang Young-ran; Uhm Hyun-kyung; Jonathan Yiombi	Patricia Yiombi & Jonathan Yiombi; Lee Young-ja	Jang Young-ran; Uhm Hyun-kyung	Yoo Gyu-seon (Jonathan Yiombi's manager); Song Sung-ho (Lee Young-ja's manager)	—	
211	6 August	Jang Young-ran; Uhm Hyun-kyung; Jonathan Yiombi	Uhm Hyun-kyung; Lee Young-ja	Jang Young-ran; Jonathan Yiombi	Shin Jae-hyuk (Uhm Hyun-kyung's manager); Song Sung-ho (Lee Young-ja's manager)	—	
212	13 August	Jo Jae-yoon; Kim Ho-young; Cho Myung-sub	Lee Young-ja; Jo Jae-yoon	Kim Ho-young; Cho Myung-sub	Song Sung-ho (Lee Young-ja's manager); Jo Soon-ki (Jo Jae-yoon's manager)	Special appearances by Lee Jung-jae and Jung Woo-sung.	
213	20 August	Lee Seok-hoon (SG Wannabe); Kim Ho-young; Lee Jung-hyun	Lee Seok-hoon; Lee Young-ja	Kim Ho-young; Lee Jung-hyun	Lee Geun-muk (Lee Seok-hoon's manager); Song Sung-ho (Lee Young-ja's manager)	Special appearances by Lee Jung-jae and Jung Woo-sung.	
214	27 August	Won Jin-ah; Lee Guk-joo; Kwon Yul	Won Jin-ah	Lee Guk-joo; Kwon Yul	Cho Yu-rim (Won Jin-ah's manager)	—	
214	27 August	Lee Seok-hoon (SG Wannabe); Kim Ho-young; Lee Jung-hyun	Lee Jung-hyun	Kim Ho-young; Lee Seok-hoon	Kim Tae-yeon (Lee Jung-hyun's manager)	—	
215	3 September	Lee Guk-joo; Choi Soo-young (SNSD); Kim Shin-young; Kwon Yul	Lee Guk-joo; Choi Soo-young	Kim Shin-young; Kwon Yul	Lee Sang-soo (Lee Guk-joo's manager); Shin Hyun-bin (Choi Soo-young's manager)	Kim Shin-young stand-in for Song Eun-i due to schedule conflict with Busan International Comedy Festival filming.	
216	10 September	Daniel Henney; Jonathan Yiombi; An Yu-jin (Ive)	Daniel Henney	Jonathan Yiombi; An Yu-jin	Martin (Daniel Henney's manager)	—	
216	10 September	Patricia Yiombi & Jonathan Yiombi; Lee Guk-joo	Patricia & Jonathan Yiombi	Lee Guk-joo	Yoo Gyu-seon (Patricia & Jonathan Yiombi's manager)	—	
217	17 September	Patricia Yiombi & Jonathan Yiombi; Lee Guk-joo	Lee Guk-joo	Patricia & Jonathan Yiombi	Lee Sang-soo (Lee Guk-joo's manager)	—	
217	17 September	Daniel Henney; Jonathan Yiombi; Lee Guk-joo	Daniel Henney	Jonathan Yiombi; Lee Guk-joo	Martin (Daniel Henney's manager)	—	
218	24 September	Yum Jung-ah; Lee Guk-joo; Yook Sung-jae (BtoB)	Yum Jung-ah; Lee Guk-joo	Yook Sung-jae	Kim Seong-yong (Yum Jung-ah's manager); Lee Sang-soo (Lee Guk-joo's manager)	Hong Hyun-hee returns to the show after her maternal leave.	
219	1 October	Yook Sung-jae (BtoB); Brian Joo (Fly to the Sky)	Yook Sung-jae; Brian Joo	—	Kim Jung-woo (Yook Sung-jae's manager); Hong Seung-ran (Brian Joo's manager)	—	
220	8 October	Ryu Seung-soo; Aiki (Hook); Kim Ho-young	Ryu Seung-soo; Aiki	Kim Ho-young	Woo Seong-cheol (Ryu Seung-soo's manager); Park Ga-hee (Aiki's manager)	—	
221	15 October	Mimi (Oh My Girl); Uhm Hyun-kyung; Kim Ho-young	Mimi; Uhm Hyun-kyung	Kim Ho-young	Jee Da-yoon (Mimi's manager); Shin Jae-hyuk (Uhm Hyun-kyung's manager)	—	
222	22 October	Lee Guk-joo; Tei; Lee Seok-hoon (SG Wannabe)	Lee Guk-joo; Tei	Lee Seok-hoon	Lee Sang-soo (Lee Guk-joo's manager); Kim Young-hye (Tei's manager)	—	
223	29 October	Lee Guk-joo; Yoon Byung-hee	Lee Guk-joo; Yoon Byung-hee	—	Lee Sang-soo (Lee Guk-joo's manager); Kim Moo-yeon (Yoon Byung-hee's manager)	—	
No broadcast on 5 November due to mourning the deaths of Seoul Halloween crowd crush.
224	12 November	Lee Ki-woo; Aiki (Hook); Hanhae	Lee Ki-woo; Aiki	Hanhae	Kim Hyung-joon (Aeju) (Lee Ki-woo's manager); Park Ga-hee (Aiki's manager)	—	
225	19 November	Yeo Jin-goo; Hanhae; Nam Chang-hee	Yeo Jin-goo; Hanhae	Nam Chang-hee	Kim Jae-hwan (Yeo Jin-goo's manager); Lee Ho-jin (Hanhae's manager)	—	
226	26 November	Kwon Yul; Lee Guk-joo	Kwon Yul; Lee Guk-joo	—	Kim Myung-sung (Kwon Yul's manager); Lee Sang-soo (Lee Guk-joo's manager)	—	
No broadcast on 3 and 10 December due to 2022 World Cup live telecast.
227	17 December	Kwon Yul; Giriboy; Lee Guk-joo	Giriboy; Lee Guk-joo	Kwon Yul	Go Joon-hyuk (Giriboy's manager); Lee Sang-soo (Lee Guk-joo's manager)	—	
228	24 December	Kim Ho-young; Lee Seok-hoon (SG Wannabe); Lee Guk-joo	Kim Ho-young; Lee Seok-hoon	Lee Guk-joo	An Chang-hyun (Kim Ho-young's manager); Lee Geun-muk (Lee Seok-hoon's manager)	—	
No broadcast on 31 December due to 2022 MBC Music Awards live telecast.

=== 2023 ===
List of episodes in 2023 (229–279)

Ep #	Air Date	Studio Guest(s)	Protagonist(s)	Guest Interferer(s)	Manager Appearance(s)	Remarks	Ref
229	7 January	Lee Seok-hoon (SG Wannabe); Lee Guk-joo; Hanhae	Hanhae; Hong Hyun Hee	Lee Seok-hoon; Lee Guk-joo	Lee Ho-jin (Hanhae's manager); Park Jun-young (Hong Hyun-hee's manager)	—	
230	14 January	Son Yeon-jae; Mimi (Oh My Girl); Kwon Yul	Son Yeon-jae; Lee Young-ja	Mimi; Kwon Yul	Kim Su-yeon (Son Yeon-jae's manager); Song Seong-ho & Park Dong-ok (Lee Young-ja's managers)	Kwon Yul stand-in for Yoo Byung-jae.	
231	21 January	Lee Guk-joo; Cha Jung-won; Kwon Yul	Cha Jung-won; Lee Young-ja	Lee Guk-joo; Kwon Yul	Choi Jae-won (Cha Jung-won's manager); Song Seong-ho & Park Dong-ok (Lee Young-ja's managers)	Kwon Yul stand-in for Yoo Byung-jae.	
232	28 January	Taeyang (Big Bang); Tei; Patricia Yiombi	Tei; Taeyang	Patricia Yiombi	Kim Young-hye (Tei's manager); Kim Kyung-rae (Taeyang's manager)	—	
233	4 February	Taeyang (Big Bang); Han Bo-reum; Choi Yoon-young	Han Bo-reum; Taeyang	Choi Yoon-young	Jee In-wook (Han Bo-reum's manager); Kim Kyung-rae (Taeyang's manager)	—	
234	11 February	Lee Guk-joo; Lee Chan-won	Lee Young-ja	Lee Guk-joo; Lee Chan-won	Song Seong-ho (Lee Young-ja's manager)	—	
235	18 February	Lee Guk-joo; Lee Chan-won	Lee Guk-joo; Lee Young-ja	Lee Chan-won	Lee Sang-soo (Lee Guk-joo's manager); Song Seong-ho (Lee Young-ja's manager)	—	
236	25 February	Park Sung-kwang; Kim Min-seok (MeloMance)	Song Eun-i; Kim Min-seok	Park Sung-kwang	Kim Han-hee (Song Eun-i's manager); Yang Byung-chan (Kim Min-seok's manager)	—	
237	4 March	Park Sung-kwang; Lee Guk-joo; Kim Min-seok (MeloMance)	Park Sung-kwang; Song Eun-i	Lee Guk-joo; Kim Min-seok	Im Song (Park Sung-kwang's former manager); Kim Han-hee (Song Eun-i's manager)	Casts and guests celebrate the show's 5th anniversary since debut.	
238	11 March	Hanhae; Yoo Tae-o	Yoo Tae-o; Hanhae	——	Seo Hong-jin & Bae Chang-Hyun (Yoo Tae-o's managers); Lee Ho-jin (Hanhae's manager)	Hanhae is the manager for a day for Lee Ho-jin.	
239	18 March	Shin Ye-eun; Forestella (Cho Min-gyu & Go Woo-rim)	Forestella; Shin Ye-eun	—	Choi Dae-sik (Forestella's manager); Han Ji-haeng (Shin Ye-eun's manager)	—	
240	25 March	Won Jin-ah; Jang Hang-jun	Won Jin-ah; Jang Hang-jun	—	Cho Yoo-rim (Won Jin-ah's manager); Song Eun-i (Jang Hang-jun's manager)	—	
241	1 April	Jang Hang-jun; Poongja; Lee Guk-joo	Jang Hang-jun; Poongja	Lee Guk-joo	Song Eun-i (Jang Hang-jun's manager); Kim Dae-young (Poongja's makeup artist)	—	
242	8 April	Choo Sung-hoon; Cha Joo-young	Cha Joo-young; Choo Sung-hoon	—	Lee Chang-min (Cha Joo-young's manager); Kim Sang-hyun (Choo Sung-hoon's manager)	—	
243	15 April	Choo Sung-hoon; Lee Guk-joo; Poongja	Lee Guk-joo; Choo Sung-hoon	Poongja	Lee Sang-soo (Lee Guk-joo's manager); Kim Sang-hyun (Choo Sung-hoon's manager)	—	
244	22 April	Yoo In-na; Kwon Il-yong	Yoo In-na; Kwon Il-yong	—	Kim Yeon-seong (Yoo In-na's manager); Kim Do-hyung (Kwon Il-yong's manager)	—	
245	29 April	Kang Susie; Yoo In-na	Kang Susie; Yoo In-na	—	Bae Young-ho (Kang Susie's manager); Kim Yeon-seong (Yoo In-na's manager)	—	
246	6 May	Kwon Jung-yeol (10cm); Ko Young-bae (Soran)	Kwon Jung-yeol; Lee Young-ja	Ko Young-bae	Jung Jun-gu & Kim Yoo-jae (Kwon Jung-yeol's managers); Song Sung-ho (Lee Young-ja's manager)	—	
247	13 May	Dawn; Lee Guk-joo	Lee Guk-joo; Dawn	—	Lee Sang-soo (Lee Guk-joo's manager); Jung Do-yoon (Dawn's manager)	—	
248	20 May	Tei; Cho Mi-yeon ((G)I-dle); Lee Guk-joo	Lee Guk-joo; Tei	Cho Mi-yeon	Lee Sang-soo (Lee Guk-joo's manager); Kim Young-hye (Tei's manager)	—	
249	27 May	Kwon Yul; Kwakchu-hyung (Note: a.k.a. Hong Sung-woo)	Lee Young-ja; Kwakchu-hyung	Kwon Yul	Song Sung-ho (Lee Young-ja's manager); Cho Ah-young (Kwakchu-hyung's manager)	—	
250	3 June	Pak Se-ri; Kim Min-seok (MeloMance)	Pak Se-ri; Lee Young-ja	Kim Min-seok	Noh Joo-ae & Kim Hye-rin (Pak Se-ri's managers); Song Sung-ho (Lee Young-ja's manager)	—	
251	10 June	Pak Se-ri; Kim Jae-hwa	Kim Jae-hwa; Pak Se-ri	—	Han Sang-hoon (Kim Jae-hwa's manager); Noh Joo-ae & Kim Hye-rin (Pak Se-ri's managers)	—	
252	17 June	Min Woo-hyuk; Poongja; Lee Guk-joo	Min Woo-hyuk; Poongja	Lee Guk-joo	Baek Ye-ri (Min Woo-hyuk's manager); Kim Dae-young (Poongja's makeup artist)	—	
253	24 June	Taemin (Shinee); Poongja; Lee Guk-joo	Taemin; Lee Guk-joo	Poongja	Nam Eui-Soo (Taemin's manager); Lee Sang-soo (Lee Guk-joo's manager)	—	
254	1 July	Jung Woo; Kwon Yul	Lee Young-ja; Jung Woo	Kwon Yul	Song Sung-ho (Lee Young-ja's manager); Yoo Kwang-seok (Jung Woo's manager)	—	
255	8 July	Kim Min-seok (MeloMance); Kwon Yul	Lee Young-ja; Kim Min-seok	Kwon Yul	Song Sung-ho (Lee Young-ja's manager); Yang Byung-chan (Kim Min-seok's manager)	—	
256	15 July	Kim Nam-hee; Lee Guk-joo	Kim Nam-hee	Lee Guk-joo	Seok Hye-kyung & Jeon Woo-seok (Kim Nam-hee's managers)	—	
256	15 July	Jung Woo; Kwon Yul	Lee Young-ja	Jung Woo; Kwon Yul	Song Sung-ho (Lee Young-ja's manager)	—	
No new episode was broadcast on 22 July due to 2023 South Korea floods.
257	29 July	Ha Do-kwon; Ahn Eun-jin	Ha Do-kwon; Ahn Eun-jin	—	Seong Ki-ho (Ha Do-kwon's manager); Choi Hong-yoon & Kang Bo-kyung (Ahn Eun-jin's managers)	—	
258	5 August	Jaejae; Poongja; Lee Guk-joo	Jaejae; Poongja	Lee Guk-joo	JaeJae (Jaejae does not have a manager); Kim Dae-young (Poongja's makeup artist) & Park Woo-hyun (Poongja's hairstylist)	—	
259	12 August	Jo Hyun-ah (Urban Zakapa); Min Woo-hyuk	Jo Hyun-ah; Min Woo-hyuk	—	Ryu Ho-won (Jo Hyun-ah's manager); Baek Ye-ri (Min Woo-hyuk's manager)	—	
260	19 August	Kwon Yul; Lee Sang-yeob	Lee Sang-yeob; Lee Young-ja	Kwon Yul	Park Seung-joon (Lee Sang-yeob's manager); Song Sung-ho (Lee Young-ja's manager)	Song Sung-ho debut as a trot singer (part 1)	
261	26 August	Lee Sang-yeob; Lee Guk-joo; Kwon Jung-yeol (10cm)	Lee Young-ja; Kwon Jung-yeol	Lee Guk-joo	Song Sung-ho (Lee Young-ja's manager); Jung Jun-gu & Kim Yoo-jae (Kwon Jung-yeol's managers)	Song Sung-ho debut as a trot singer (part 2)	
262	2 September	AKMU (Lee Su-hyun & Lee Chan-hyuk)	Lee Su-hyun; Hong Hyun Hee	Lee Chan-hyuk	Hwang Hyun-Sik (Lee Su-hyun's manager); Jeong-Cheol Hwang (Hong Hyun-hee's former manager)	—	
263	9 September	Lee Guk-joo; Poongja; Min Woo-hyuk	Min Woo-hyuk; Lee Guk-joo	Poongja	Baek Ye-ri (Min Woo-hyuk's manager); Lee Sang-soo (Lee Guk-joo's manager)	—	
264	16 September	Lee Guk-joo; Poongja; Min Woo-hyuk	Min Woo-hyuk; Poongja	Lee Guk-joo	Baek Ye-ri (Min Woo-hyuk's manager); Kim Dae-young (Poongja's makeup artist)	—	
265	23 September	Kwon Eun-bi; Dex	Dex; Kwon Eun-bi	—	Agent H (Dex's manager); Byung Seong-jae (Kwon Eun-bi's manager)	—	
266	30 September	Young Tak; Kwon Eun-bi; Dex	Young Tak; Dex	Kwon Eun-bi	Oh Hoon-sik (Young Tak's manager); Agent H (Dex's manager)	—	
267	7 October	Lee Seok-hoon (SG Wannabe); Lee Sang-yeob	Hong Hyun Hee; Lee Sang-yeob	Lee Seok-hoon	Kwak Sang-won (Hong Hyun-hee's manager); Park Seung-joon (Lee Sang-yeob's manager)	—	
268	14 October	Lee Seok-hoon (SG Wannabe); Lee Guk-joo	Hong Hyun-hee; Lee Guk-joo	Lee Seok-hoon	Kwak Sang-won (Hong Hyun-hee's manager); Lee Sang-soo (Lee Guk-joo's manager)	—	
269	21 October	Poongja; Pak Se-ri	Poongja; Pak Se-ri	—	Kim Dae-young (Poongja's makeup artist) & Park Woo-hyun (Poongja's hairstylist); Noh Joo-ae, Kim Hye-rin & Park Won-chul (Pak Se-ri's managers)	—	
270	28 October	Kim Young-dae; Jang Hang-jun	Kim Young-dae; Jang Hang-jun	—	Lee Jung-min (Kim Young-dae's manager); Song Eun-i (Jang Hang-jun's manager)	—	
271	4 November	Lee Guk-joo; KwakTube	KwakTube; Lee Guk-joo	—	Lee Seung-min (KwakTube's manager); Lee Sang-soo (Lee Guk-joo's manager)	—	
272	11 November	Jo Hye-ryun; Lee Guk-joo	Jo Hye-ryun; Lee Guk-joo	—	Ji So-hyun (Joo Hye-lyun's manager); Lee Sang-soo (Lee Guk-joo's manager)	—	
273	18 November	Jay Park; Meenoi	Jay Park; Meenoi	—	Kang Hyun-soo (Jay Park's manager); Park Jang-hun (Meenoi's manager)	—	
274	25 November	Jay Park; Meenoi; KwakTube	Jay Park; KwakTube	Meenoi	Kang Hyun-soo (Jay Park's manager); Lee Seung-min (KwakTube's manager)	—	
275	2 December	Uhm Jung-hwa; Lee Joo-young	Uhm Jung-hwa; Lee Joo-young	—	Lee Dong-jin (Uhm Jung-hwa's manager); Kim Soo-Gyung (Lee Joo-young's manager)	—	
276	9 December	Zion.T; Kwon Eun-bi	Zion.T; Kwon Eun-bi	—	Jung Yo-sep (Zion.T's manager); Byung Seong-jae (Kwon Eun-bi's manager)	—	
277	16 December	Lee Guk-joo; Choi Ye-na	Cheonan Fatty (Im Jeong-su); Lee Young-ja	Lee Guk-joo; Choi Ye-na	Hong Hyun Hee} (Cheonan Fatty's manager); Song Sung-ho (Lee Young-ja's manager)	Hong Hyun-hee as Cheonan Fatty's manager for a day.	
278	23 December	Shin Gi-ru; Lee Guk-joo	Shin Gi-ru; Lee Guk-joo; Lee Young-ja	—	Lee Sang-soo (Lee Guk-joo's manager); Song Sung-ho (Lee Young-ja's manager)	—	
279	30 December	Lee Guk-joo; Seol Young-woo	Seol Young-woo; Lee Guk-joo	—	Kim Jong-han (Seol Young-woo's trainer); Lee Sang-soo (Lee Guk-joo's manager)	—	

=== 2024 ===
List of episodes in 2024 (280–327)

Ep #	Air Date	Studio Guest(s)	Protagonist(s)	Guest Interferer(s)	Manager Appearance(s)	Remarks	Ref
280	6 January	Kang Cheol-won (Note: Zookeeper/Caretaker of Fu Bao (Giant panda in Everland)); Lee Guk-joo	Kang Cheol-won; Yang Se-hyung	Lee Guk-joo	Byun Jin-soo (Yang Se-hyung's stylist)	—	
281	13 January	Poongja; Shin Gi-ru; Jung Il-woo	Jung Il-woo; Poongja; Shin Gi-ru	—	Joo Yoon-seok (Jung Il-woo's manager); Kim Dae-young (Poongja's makeup artist)	2023 MBC Entertainment Awards special.	
282	20 January	Min Woo-hyuk; Choi Kang-hee	Min Woo-hyuk; Choi Kang-hee	—	Baek Ye-ri (Min Woo-hyuk's manager)	—	
283	27 January	Pak Se-ri; Lee Guk-joo; Shin Gi-ru	Pak Se-ri; Shin Gi-ru	Lee Guk-joo	Noh Joo-ae, Kim Hye-rin & Park Won-chul (Pak Se-ri's managers); Kim Tae-young (Shin Gi-ru's manager)	—	
284	3 February	Poongja; KwakTube	KwakTube; Hong Hyun Hee	Poongja	Lee Seung-min (KwakTube's manager); Salon Fatty (Note: a.k.a. Han Hyun-jae) (Hong Hyun-hee's makeup artist)	—	
285	10 February	Lee Guk-joo; Lee Jae-won	Lee Jae-won; Lee Guk-joo	—	Han Deung-kyu (Lee Jae-won's manager); Lee Sang-soo (Lee Guk-joo's manager)	—	
286	17 February	Brian Joo (Fly to the Sky); Zico (Block B)	Brian Joo; Zico	—	Hong Seung-ran (Brian Joo's manager); Jang Moon-sung (Zico's manager)	—	
287	24 February	Le Sserafim (Chaewon & Sakura); Shin Gi-ru	Le Sserafim; Shin Gi-ru	—	Shin Kwang-jae, Park Han-ul, Kim Hyun-ho & An Eun-bi (Le Sserafim's managers); Kim Tae-young (Shin Gi-ru's manager)	—	
288	2 March	Swings; Ryu Kyung-soo	Ryu Kyung-soo; Swings	—	Kang Ju-hee (Ryu Kyung-soo's manager); Kim Jin-Hyuk (Swings' manager)	—	
289	9 March	Shin Gi-ru	Hong Hyun Hee; Jun Hyun-moo; Lee Young-ja; Song Eun-i	Shin Gi-ru	Salon Fatty (Hong Hyun-hee's makeup artist)	Part 1 in Singapore.	
290	16 March	Chung Seung-je; Young K (Day6)	Chung Seung-je	Young K	Kim Hyun-ki (Chung Seung-je's manager)	—	
290	16 March	Chung Seung-je; Young K (Day6)	Hong Hyun-hee; Jun Hyun-moo; Lee Young-ja; Song Eun-i	Chung Seung-je; Young K	Salon Fatty (Hong Hyun-hee's makeup artist)	Part 2 in Singapore.	
291	23 March	Brian Joo (Fly to the Sky); Gwedo (Note: a.k.a. Kim Jae-hyuk is a scientist)	Brian Joo; Gwedo	—	Hong Seung-ran (Brian Joo's manager); Song Yeong-jo (Gwedo's manager)	—	
292	30 March	Shin Gi-ru; Poongja; Gwedo; Kim Seon-tae (Note: a.k.a. Chungju-Man is a civil servant)	Kim Seon-tae; Poongja	Shin Gi-ru; Gwedo	Kim Dae-young (Poongja's makeup artist)	—	
293	6 April	Jo Hye-ryun; Chae Jung-an	Chae Jung-an; Jo Hye-ryun	—	Song Dong-han (Chae Jung-an's manager); Ji So-hyun (Jo Hye-ryun's manager)	—	
294	13 April	Shin Gi-ru; Young K (Day6)	Young K Shin Gi-ru	—	Kim Hye-won (Day6's manager); Kim Tae-young (Shin Gi-ru's manager)	—	
295	20 April	Lee Joon; Shin Hyun-ji	Lee Joon; Shin Hyun-ji	—	Lee Kwang-ju (Lee Joon's manager); Son Ye-ram (Shin Hyun-ji's manager)	—	
296	27 April	Park We; Song Ji-eun; Lee Joon	Park We; Lee Joon	—	Song Ji-eun (Park We's manager); Lee Kwang-ju (Lee Joon's manager)	—	
297	4 May	Choi Kang-hee; Ahn Hyun-mo	Choi Kang-hee; Ahn Hyun-mo	—	Park Ga-hee (Ahn Hyun-mo's manager)	—	
298	11 May	HyunA	HyunA; Hong Hyun Hee	—	Kwon Oh-sung (HyunA's manager); Salon Fatty (Hong Hyun-hee's makeup artist)	—	
299	18 May	Lee Sang-yeob; Lee Seok-hoon (SG Wannabe)	Lee Sang-yeob; Hong Hyun-hee	Lee Seok-hoon	Park Seung-joon (Lee Sang-yeob's manager); Salon Fatty (Hong Hyun-hee's makeup artist)	—	
300	25 May	Poongja; Lee Sang-yeob; Park We; Song Ji-eun	Song Ji-eun; Poongja	Lee Sang-yeob	Park We (Song Ji-eun's manager); Kim Dae-young (Poongja's makeup artist)	—	
301	1 June	Lee Joon; Choi Daniel	Lee Joon; Choi Daniel	—	Lee Kwang-ju (Lee Joon's manager); Kim Ji-hoon (Choi Daniel's manager)	—	
302	8 June	Lee Joon; Lee Guk-joo; Lee Kwan-hee	Lee Kwan-hee; Lee Guk-joo	Lee Joon	Lee Chang-hak & Baek Jong-ho (Lee Kwan-hee's managers); Lee Sang-soo (Lee Guk-joo's manager)	—	
303	15 June	Day6 (Young K & Wonpil); Jo Hye-ryun	Day6; Jo Hye-ryun	—	Kim Hye-won (Day6's manager); Ji So-hyun (Jo Hye-ryun's manager)	—	
304	22 June	Shin Gi-ru; Kim Seon-tae; Chuu	Kim Seon-tae; Hong Hyun Hee & Shin Gi-ru	Chuu	Lee Hyeong-ah (Kim Seon-tae's manager); Salon Fatty (Hong Hyun-hee's makeup artist)	—	
305	29 June	Lee Kwan-hee; Lee Joon	Lee Kwan-hee; Lee Young-ja	Lee Joon	Baek Jong-ho (Lee Kwan-hee's manager); Song Sung-ho (Lee Young-ja's manager)	—	
306	6 July	Enhypen (Sunghoon & Sunoo); Kang Cheol-won (Note: Zookeeper at Everland) & Oh Seung-hee	Kang Cheol-won & Oh Seung-hee; Enhypen	—	Hong Yu-ki (Enhypen's manager)	—	
307	13 July	Solbi; TripleS (Kim Yoo-yeon & Kim Na-kyoung)	TripleS; Solbi	—	Jang Hae-sol (TripleS' manager); Lee Mi-hyun (Solbi's manager)	—	
308	20 July	Lee Guk-joo; Choi Daniel	Choi Daniel; Lee Guk-joo	—	Kim Ji-hoon (Choi Daniel's manager); Lee Sang-soo (Lee Guk-joo's manager)	—	
No broadcast between 27 July and 10 August due to live telecast of 2024 Summer Olympics.
309	17 August	Kwon Eun-bi; Lee Joon	Kwon Eun-bi; Lee Joon	—	Byung Seong-jae (Kwon Eun-bi's manager); Lee Kwang-ju (Lee Joon's manager)	—	
310	24 August	Park Sung-woong; Park We & Song Ji-eun	Park Sung-woong; Park We	—	Cho Jong-seok (Park Sung-woong's manager); Lee Seung-hwang (Park Sung-woong's hair designer); Song Ji-eun (Park We's manager)	—	
311	31 August	Lee Sang-yeob; Han Sang-bo (Note: Han Sang-bo is a hair loss treatment doctor)	Han Sang-bo; Lee Sang-yeob	—	Kwon Mi-Yeong (Han Sang-bo's manager); Park Seung-joon (Lee Sang-yeob's manager)	—	
312	7 September	Oh Hye-ri; Seo Geon-woo; Kim Min-jong	Oh Hye-ri; Seo Geon-woo; Kim Min-jong	—	Kim Won-jin (Kim Min-jong's coach)	—	
313	14 September	Yoon Jong-hoon; Urban Zakapa (Kwon Sun-il, Jo Hyun-ah & Park Yong-in)	Yoon Jong-hoon; Urban Zakapa	—	Kim Soo-bin (Yoon Jong-hoon's manager); Ryu Ho-won (Urban Zakapa's manager)	—	
314	21 September	Dex; Huh Mi-mi	Dex; Huh Mi-mi	—	Sun Dong-woo (Dex's trainer); Kim Jung-hoon (Huh Mi-mi's judo coach)	—	
315	28 September	Dex; RISABAE	RISABAE; Dex	—	Kim Eun-ha (RISABAE's manager); Sun Dong-woo (Dex's trainer)	—	
316	5 October	Choi Kang-hee; Kim Na-young	Choi Kang-hee; Kim Na-young	—	Song Eun-i (Choi Kang-hee's CEO); Byun Keun-byul (Kim Na-young's manager)	—	
317	12 October	Choi Daniel; Han Jae-yi	Choi Daniel; Han Jae-yi	—	Kim Ji-hoon (Choi Daniel's manager); Kim Ju-yeon (Han Jae-yi's manager)	—	
318	19 October	Yoo Teo g.o.d (Kim Tae-woo, Danny Ahn & Joon Park)	g.o.d Yoo Teo	—	Shin Dong-hoon & Kim Joon-seok (g.o.d's managers); Choi Bo-geun (Yoo Teo's manager)	—	
319	26 October	Urban Zakapa (Kwon Sun-il, Jo Hyun-ah & Park Yong-in)	Lee Young-ja; Urban Zakapa	—	Song Sung-ho (Lee Young-ja's manager); Ryu Ho-won (Urban Zakapa's manager)	—	
320	2 November	Choi Hyun-seok; Onew (Shinee)	Choi Hyun-seok; Onew	—	Kim Seon Yeop (Choi Hyun-seok's head chef); Jang Moon-sung (Onew's manager)	—	
321	9 November	Choi Kang-hee; Choi Hyun-woo	Choi Kang-hee; Choi Hyun-woo	—	Lee Jae-joon (Choi Hyun-woo's manager)	—	
322	16 November	Choi Daniel; Ahn Eun-jin	Ahn Eun-jin; Choi Daniel	—	Han Ah-jung (Ahn Eun-jin's play assistant director); Kim Ji-hoon (Choi Daniel's manager)	—	
323	23 November	9XL Girls (Shin Gi-ru, Lee Guk-joo & Poongja); TWS (Shinyu & Dohoon)	TWS; 9XL Girls	—	Jo Seong-je (TWS' manager); Lee Sang-soo (Lee Guk-joo's manager)	—	
324	30 November	Choi Kang-hee; Chef Yoon Nam-no	Choi Kang-hee; Chef Yoon Nam-no	—	Kim Tae-yeop & Jeon Joo-hong (Yoon Nam-no's junior chefs)	—	
No new episode on 7 December. MBC News Special was telecasted instead.
325	14 December	Yoon Jong-hoon; Ralral	Ralral; Yoon Jong-hoon	—	Yeon Kwang-mo (Ralral's manager); Kim Soo-bin (Yoon Jong-hoon's manager)	—	
326	21 December	Choi Daniel; Jeon Yu-na	Jeon Yu-na; Choi Daniel	—	Lee Chang-hoon (Jeon Yu-na's manager); Kim Ji-hoon (Choi Daniel's manager)	—	
327	28 December	Kim Do-yeong & Park Ji-hoon; Shin Gi-ru	Kim Do-yeong; Hong Hyun Hee & Shin Gi-ru	—	Park Ji-hoon (Agent for Kim Do-yeong) & Hong Tae-ho (Kim Do-yeong's manager); Salon Fatty (Hong Hyun-hee's makeup artist)	—	

=== 2025 ===
List of episodes in 2025 (328–378)

Ep #	Air Date	Studio Guest(s)	Protagonist(s)	Guest Interferer(s)	Manager Appearance(s)	Remarks	Ref
328	4 January	Urban Zakapa	Urban Zakapa; Lee Young-ja	—	Ryu Ho-won (Urban Zakapa's manager); Song Sung-ho (Lee Young-ja's manager)	—	
329	11 January	Ralral; Nam Doh-hyeong	Nam Doh-hyeong; Ralral	—	Kil Han-saem (Nam Doh-hyeong's manager); Yeon Kwang-mo (Ralral's manager)	—	
330	18 January	Pak Se-ri; Kim Soo-ji	Kim Soo-ji; Pak Se-ri	—	Jeon Jong-hwan (Kim Soo-ji's team leader); Noh Joo-ae, Kim Hye-rin & Kim Sun-woo (Pak Se-ri's managers)	—	
331	25 January	Kim Ah-young; Baby Vox	Baby Vox; Kim Ah-young	—	Park Su-min (Baby Vox's choreographer); Kim Taek-young (Kim Ah-young's manager)	—	
332	1 February	Yeonwoo; Shin Hyun-joon; Jung Joon-ho	Jung Joon-ho & Shin Hyun-joon; Yeonwoo	—	Yoon Seul-gi (Yeonwoo's manager)	—	
333	8 February	Choi Kang-hee; Lee Eun-gyeol	Choi Kang-hee; Lee Eun-gyeol	—	Elena (Lee Eun-gyeol's assistant)	2024 MBC Entertainment Awards special.	
334	15 February	Lee Yeon-hee; Kim Seon-tae	Lee Yeon-hee; Kim Seon-tae	—	Lee Ki-won (Lee Yeon-hee's manager); Lee Hyeong-ah & Choi Ji-ho (Kim Seon-tae's managers)	—	
335	22 February	Hanhae; Hwang Seok-hee	Hwang Seok-hee; Hanhae	—	Oh Jong-hyeon (Hwang Seok-hee's manager); Rhymer (Hanhae's manager/CEO)	—	
336	1 March	Kim So-hyun & Son Jun-ho; Hwang Min-ho	Kim So-hyun & Son Jun-ho; Hwang Min-ho	—	Seok Hyuk-jin (Kim So-hyun & Son Jun-ho's manager); Im Min-woo & Hwang Ui-chang (Hwang Min-ho's managers)	—	
337	8 March	Shin Gi-ru; Shim Eu-ddeum	Shim Eu-ddeum; Shin Gi-ru	—	Kim Hyung-cheol (Shim Eu-ddeum's manager); Lee Kang-hee (Shin Gi-ru's CEO)	—	
338	15 March	Yoon Eun-hye; Xiumin (Exo)	Xiumin; Yoon Eun-hye	—	Kang Woo-seok (Xiumin's manager); Moon Sang-min & Yoo In-bi (Yoon Eun-hye's managers)	—	
339	22 March	Hwang Dong-ju	Lee Young-ja; Hwang Dong-ju	—	Song Sung-ho (Lee Young-ja's manager); Yoon Min-hyuk (Hwang Dong-ju's manager)	—	
340	29 March	Yook Jun-seo	Yook Jun-seo; Lee Young-ja	—	Im Yeong-jin (Yook Jun-seo's manager); Song Sung-ho (Lee Young-ja's manager)	—	
341	5 April	KCM	KCM; Hong Hyun Hee	—	Park Eun-ji (KCM's manager); Salon Fatty (Hong Hyun-hee's makeup artist)	—	
342	12 April	Chef Yoon Nam-no; ITSub	ITSub; Chef Yoon Nam-no	—	Cho Yong-jin (ITSub's YouTube Channel producer); Kim Tae-yeop, Jeon Joo-hong & Park Gun-woo (Yoon Nam-no's junior chefs)	—	
343	19 April	Park Kyung-lim; Wing (Note: a.k.a. Kim Geon-ho (김건호) is a beatboxer.)	Wing; Park Kyung-lim	—	Park Jun-hyun (Wing's manager); Yoo Seung Woo (Park Kyung-lim's manager); Park In-se (Park Kyung-lim's dance instructor)	—	
344	26 April	Kim So-hyun & Son Jun-ho; Zerobaseone (Sung Han-bin & Zhang Hao)	Kim So-hyun & Son Jun-ho; Zerobaseone	—	Seok Hyuk-jin (Kim So-hyun & Son Jun-ho's manager); Yoon Hong-sik & Jeong Jae-seo (Zerobaseone's managers)	—	
345	3 May	Kim Sung-ryung; Kim Suk-hoon	Kim Suk-hoon; Kim Sung-ryung	—	Jung Ji-young (Kim Suk-hoon's manager); Yoon Dae-hoon (Kim Sung-ryung's manager)	—	
346	10 May	Yoon Eun-hye; Fly to the Sky (Hwanhee & Brian Joo)	Hwanhee; Yoon Eun-hye	Brian Joo	Ma Dong-yeop (Hwanhee's manager); Moon Sang-min (Yoon Eun-hye's manager)	—	
347	17 May	Shin Gi-ru; I-dle	I-dle; Shin Gi-ru	—	Park Se-in (Soyeon's manager), Im Seong-hun (Miyeon's manager), Jo Hyeon-jin (Yuqi's manager), Yun Shin-Il (Minnie's manager) & Kim Do-hyeon (Shuhua's manager); Lee Kang-hee (Shin Gi-ru's CEO)	—	
348	24 May	Choi Daniel; Zo Zazz	Zo Zazz; Choi Daniel	—	An Yeong-min (Zo Zazz's manager & CEO); Kim Ji-hoon (Choi Daniel's manager)	—	
349	31 May	Pak Se-ri; Hyomin (T-ara)	Pak Se-ri; Hyomin	—	Kim Hye-rin, Noh Joo-ae & Kim Sun-woo (Pak Se-ri's managers); Jo Sung-hee (Hyomin's manager)	—	
350	7 June	Chef Yoon Nam-no; Beatpella House (Wing, Hiss & Hellcat)	Beatpella House; Chef Yoon Nam-no	—	Park Jun-hyeong (Beatpella House's manager & CEO); Kim Tae-yeop (Chef Yoon Nam-no's junior chef)	—	
351	14 June	Kim Soo-ji; J-Hope (BTS)	J-Hope; Kim Soo-ji	—	Ahn Da-sol (J-Hope's manager); Jeon Jong-hwan (Kim Soo-ji's team leader)	—	
352	21 June	J-Hope (BTS); Choi Kang-hee	J-Hope; Choi Kang-hee	—	Ahn Da-sol (J-Hope's manager); Kim Mi-ja (Choi Kang-hee's friend)	—	
353	28 June	Kim Suk-hoon; Brian Joo (Fly to the Sky)	Brian Joo; Kim Suk-hoon	—	Hong Seung-ran & Kim Dong-seok (Brian Joo's managers); Jung Ji-young (Kim Suk-hoon's manager)	—	
354	5 July	Choi Kang-hee; Lee Se-hee	Lee Young-ja; Lee Se-hee	Choi Kang-hee	Song Sung-ho (Lee Young-ja's manager); Kim Young-kyu (Lee Se-hee's manager)	—	
355	12 July	Mini Ovening; Shin Gi-ru; Jo Yu-ri	Jo Yu-ri; Mini Ovening	Shin Gi-ru	Jung Ha-eun (Jo Yu-ri's manager) & Park Yong-bok (Jo Yu-ri's director); Song Won-jun (Mini Ovening's manager)	—	
356	19 July	Roy Kim; Park Ju-hyun	Park Ju-hyun; Roy Kim	—	Cho Su-min (Park Ju-hyun's manager); Lee Yi-seul (Roy Kim's manager) & Lee Han-wook (Roy Kim's stylist)	—	
357	26 July	Koyote (Shin Ji & Bbaek Ga); AllDay Project (Annie & Tarzzan)	AllDay Project; Koyote	—	Han Ho-jin (AllDay Project's manager); Lee Sang-hyun & No Sol-mon (Koyote's managers)	—	
358	2 August	Choi Kang-hee; Kim Won-hoon	Kim Won-hoon; Choi Kang-hee	—	Kim Jin-ho (Kim Won-hoon's manager)	—	
359	9 August	Lee Se-hee; Choi Kang-hee; Tzuyang	Lee Se-hee; Tzuyang	Choi Kang-hee	Kim Young-kyu (Lee Se-hee's manager); Oh Su-bin (Tzuyang's manager)	—	
360	16 August	Park Jun-myeon	Park Jun-myeon; Hong Hyun Hee	—	Kim Young-gyun (Park Jun-myeon's manager); Salon Fatty (Hong Hyun-hee's makeup artist) & Im Jong-hun (Hong Hyun-hee's stylist)	—	
361	23 August	Kwon Eun-bi; Lucy (Choi Sang-yeop, Shin Ye-chan & Jo Won-sang)	Kwon Eun-bi; Lucy	—	Byung Seong-jae & Kim Soo-Young (Kwon Eun-bi's managers); Jo Sang-hyun & Park So-hee (Lucy's managers)	—	
362	30 August	Beatpella House (Wing, Hiss & Huckle)	Beatpella House; Yang Se-hyung	—	Park Jun-hyeong (Beatpella House's manager & CEO); Byun Jin-su (Yang Se-hyung's stylist)	—	
363	6 September	Han Ji-eun; Sean (Jinusean)	Sean; Han Ji-eun	—	Kim Se-beom (Sean's manager); Ok Ju-sang (Han Ji-eun's manager)	—	
364	13 September	Sean (Jinusean); Choi Hyun-woo	Sean; Choi Hyun-woo	—	Kim Se-beom (Sean's manager); Lee Jae-joon (Choi Hyun-woo's manager)	—	
365	20 September	Choi Hyun-woo; Yido	Yido; Choi Hyun-woo	—	Shin Yong-jeong (Yido's manager); Lee Jae-joon (Choi Hyun-woo's manager)	—	
366	27 September	Park Jun-myeon; Kangnam	Kangnam; Park Jun-myeon	—	Seo Woo-won (Kangnam's manager); Kim Young-gyun (Park Jun-myeon's manager)	—	
367	4 October	Poongja; Choi Hong-man	Lee Young-ja; Choi Hong-man	Poongja	Lee Young-ja (Ingredient manager); Ahn Deok-gi & Bu Sang-hun (Choi Hong-man's managers)	—	
368	11 October	Choi Hong-man; Jo Seo-hyeong	Jo Seo-hyeong; Choi Hong-man	—	Park Jeong-hwan (Jo Seo-hyeong's manager); Ahn Deok-gi & Bu Sang-hun (Choi Hong-man's managers)	—	
369	18 October	Kim Suk-hoon; Lee Joo-ahn	Lee Joo-ahn; Kim Suk-hoon	—	Kim Yu-kyeong (Lee Joo-ahn's manager); Jung Ji-young (Kim Suk-hoon's manager)	—	
370	25 October	Tzuyang; Kim Jang-hoon	Kim Jang-hoon; Tzuyang	—	Jung Seung-hoon (Kim Jang-hoon's manager); Oh Su-bin (Tzuyang's manager)	—	
371	1 November	Roy Kim; Jang Hye-jin	Jang Hye-jin; Roy Kim	—	Lee Sang-hak (Jang Hye-jin's manager); Lee Han-wook (Roy Kim's stylist) & Kang Ha-na (Roy Kim's Youtube channel director)	—	
372	8 November	Chef Yoon Nam-no; Ji Hyun-woo	Ji Hyun-woo; Chef Yoon Nam-no	—	Kim Byung-sung (Ji Hyun-woo's manager); Kim Tae-yeop & Kim Gun-woo (Yoon Nam-no's junior chefs)	—	
No broadcast on 15 November due to live telecast of the 2025 K-Baseball Series (Korea vs Japan).
373	22 November	Choi Hong-man	Choi Hong-man; Song Eun-i	—	Ahn Deok-gi & Bu Sang-hun (Choi Hong-man's managers); Kim Do-hyung (Song Eun-i's manager)	—	
374	29 November	Tzuyang; Beatpella House (Wing & Hiss)	Tzuyang; Wing & Hiss	—	Oh Su-bin (Tzuyang's manager); Park Jun-hyeong (Beatpella House's manager & CEO)	—	
375	6 December	Poongja; Ralral; My Q	My Q Poongja & Ralral	—	Song Sung-ho (My Q's manager); Kim Dae-young (Poongja's makeup artist)	—	
376	13 December	Jeon Jong-hwan; Kim Dae-ho	Jeon Jong-hwan; Yoo Byung-jae	Kim Dae-ho	Kim Soo-ji (Jeon Jong-hwan's junior announcer); Yoo Gyu-seon (Yoo Byung-jae's co-CEO), Kwon So-rim (Yoo Byung-jae's manager) & Kim Ha-yeon (Yoo Byung-jae's project manager)	—	
377	20 December	Choi Hong-man; Tzuyang	Tzuyang; Choi Hong-man	—	Oh Su-bin (Tzuyang's manager); Ahn Deok-gi & Bu Sang-hun (Choi Hong-man's managers)	Tzuyang in Sapporo, Japan	
378	27 December	K.Will	Lee Young-ja; K.Will	—	Lee Young-ja (Ingredient manager); Lee Tae-yong (K.Will's manager)	—	

=== 2026 ===
List of episodes in 2026 (379–present)

Ep #	Air Date	Studio Guest(s)	Protagonist(s)	Guest Interferer(s)	Manager Appearance(s)	Remarks	Ref
379	3 January	Choi Kang-hee; Go Joon-hee	Go Joon-hee; Choi Kang-hee	—	Jo Han-seok (Go Joon-hee's manager)	—	
380	10 January	Sean (Jinusean); Yano Shiho	Yano Shiho; Sean	—	Seo Joo-Eun (Yano Shiho's manager); Kim Se-beom (Sean's manager)	—	
381	17 January	Roy Kim; Shin Woo-hyun	Shin Woo-hyun; Roy Kim	—	Jung Yoon-i (Shin Woo-hyun's manager); Lee Han-wook (Roy Kim's stylist)	—	
382	24 January	—	Yang Se-hyung	—	Byun Jin-su (Yang Se-hyung's stylist)	—	
383	31 January	Yoo Jong-wook; Hwang Jae-gyun	Hwang Jae-gyun; Yoo Jong-wook	—	Park Shin-woong (Hwang Jae-gyun's manager); Kim Min-woo (Yoo Jong-wook's head chef) & Kim Sang-yeol (Yoo Jong-wook's manager)	—	
384	7 February	Lee Sang-yoon; Baek Jin-kyung	Baek Jin-kyung; Lee Sang-yoon	—	Yoo Gyeong-ah (Baek Jin-kyung's manager); Kim Young-kyu (Lee Sang-yoon's manager)	—	
385	14 February	Choi Daniel; Lee Kang-tae	Lee Kang-tae; Choi Daniel	—	Tae-ra (Lee Kang-tae's manager); Kim Ji-hoon (Choi Daniel's manager)	—	
386	21 February	Kim Junsu; Kim Na-ri	Kim Na-ri; Kim Junsu	—	Lee Yoon-min (Kim Na-ri's manager); Oh Min-seok & Seok Hyuk-jin (Kim Junsu's managers)	—	
387	28 February	Park Eun-young; Park So-young	Park Eun-young; Park So-young	—	Yoon Jun-won (Park Eun-young's head chef); Jeon Jong-hwan (Park So-young's team leader)	—	
388	7 March	Hwang Jae-gyun; Lee Sung-hoon	Hwang Jae-gyun; Lee Sung-hoon	—	Park Shin-woong (Hwang Jae-gyun's manager); Kim Myung-chun (Lee Sung-hoon's manager)	—	
389	14 March	Tzuyang; Lee Sang-hun	Tzuyang; Lee Sang-hun	—	Oh Su-bin (Tzuyang's manager); Park Jin-yong (Lee Sang-hun's museum director)	—	
390	21 March	Nana; Yu Seung-eun	Nana; Yu Seung-eun	—	Choi Hyun-jin (Nana's manager); Lee Chang-ho (Yu Seung-eun's coach) & Lee Hee-jung (Yu Seung-eun's mom)	—	
391	28 March	Park Eun-young; Kwon Hwa-woon	Park Eun-young; Kwon Hwa-woon	—	Yoon Jun-won (Park Eun-young's head chef); Kang Hyun-woo (Kwon Hwa-woon's manager)	—	
392	4 April	Lee Kang-tae; Lee Elijah	Lee Elijah; Lee Kang-tae	—	Young Ji (Lee Elijah's vocal coach); Tae-Ra (Lee Kang-tae's manager)	—	
393	11 April	G Movie; Yoon Do-hyun (YB)	G Movie; Yoon Do-hyun	—	Noh Hyung-joon (G Movie's manager); Kim Jung-Il (Yoon Do-hyun's CEO)	—	
394	18 April	Lee Joo-yeon; Yang Sang-guk	Yang Sang-guk; Lee Joo-yeon	—	Han Seung (Yang Sang-guk's manager); Lee Tae-ryang (Lee Joo-yeon's manager)	—	
395	25 April	Kim Yun-ji; Um Ji-yoon	Um Ji-yoon; Kim Yun-ji	—	Kim Se-hyang (Um Ji-yoon's manager); Sun Sang-rak (Kim Yun-ji's coach)	—	
396	2 May	Jung Saem-mool; Park So-young	Park So-young; Jung Saem-mool	—	Jeon Jong-hwan (Park So-young's team leader); Kim Yu-rim (Jung Saem-mool's manager)	—	
397	9 May	Choi Kang-hee; Lee Yeon	Lee Yeon; Choi Kang-hee	—	Shin Eun-byeol (Lee Yeon's manager)	—	
398	16 May	Lee Sang-hun; Moon Sang-hun	Moon Sang-hun; Lee Sang-hun	—	Kim Jin-hyeok (Moon Sang-hun's Youtube producer); Park Jin-yong (Lee Sang-hun's museum director)	—	
399	23 May	Lee Joo-yeon; Dayoung (WJSN)	Dayoung; Lee Joo-yeon	—	Jung Ju-hyun & Kim Sung-eun (Dayoung's managers); Lee Tae-ryang (Lee Joo-yeon's manager)	—	
400	30 May	Yang Sang-guk	Lee Young-ja; Yang Sang-guk	—	Song Sung-ho (Lee Young-ja's manager); Han Seung (Yang Sang-guk's manager)	—	
401	6 June	Chef Yoon Nam-no; Kim Kwang-jin	Yoon Nam-no; Kim Kwang-jin	—	Kim Tae-yeop & Song Kyung-seop (Yoon Nam-no's colleagues); Oh Se-il (Kim Kwang-jin's stylist), Im Jin-ah & Noh Young-gon (Kim Kwang-jin's elementary school classmates)	—	
402	13 June	I.O.I (Lim Na-young, Kim Chung-ha, Kim Se-jeong, Kim Do-yeon & Kim So-hye); Choi Ji-ho	I.O.I; Choi Ji-ho	—	Go Joon-hee (I.O.I's manager), Park Geun-hong (I.O.I's first manager); Jang Yeon-joo (Choi Ji-ho's manager)	—	
403	20 June	Park Eun-young; Illit (Lee Wonhee & Park Minju)	Park Eun-young; Illit	—	Yoon Jun-won (Park Eun-young's head chef) & Kim Sung-hwan (Park Eun-young's sous-chef); Lee Bo-na (Illit's manager)	—	
404	27 June	Tiffany Young (Girls' Generation)	Lee Young-ja; Tiffany Young	—	Lee Young-ja (Ingredient manager); Ji Young-bae (Tiffany Young's manager)	—	
405	4 July	Park So-young; Lee Dong-hwi	Lee Dong-hwi; Park So-young	—	Jin Byung-chan (Lee Dong-hwi's manager); Jeon Jong-hwan (Park So-young's team leader)	—	
406	11 July	Choi Kang-hee; RESCENE (Woni & Minami)	RESCENE; Choi Kang-hee	—	Kim Hye-soo (RESCENE's manager)	Brief appearance by Park Jung-soo.	
407	18 July	Yunho (TVXQ); Yoon Na-ra	Yunho; Yoon Na-ra	—	Byun Si-woo (Yunho's manager); Park Ji-eun (Yoon Na-ra's employee) & Choe Rin (Yoon Na-ra's friend)	—	
408	25 July	J.Y. Park; Kim Ah-young	J.Y. Park; Kim Ah-young	—	Shin Byung-woo (J.Y. Park's manager); Kim Taek-young (Kim Ah-young's manager)	—	
409	1 August	J.Y. Park; Kim Kyu-won	J.Y. Park; Kim Kyu-won	—	Shin Byung-woo (J.Y. Park's manager); Hong Geun-su (Kim Kyu-won's manager)	—	
410	8 August	RESCENE	RESCENE	—	Kim Hye-soo (RESCENE's manager)	—	
411	15 August	Lee Dong-ha; Yoon Ga-i	Yoon Ga-i; Lee Dong-ha	—	Hwang Bo-hyun (Yoon Ga-i's manager); Kim Tae-yeon (Lee Dong-ha's manager)	—	
412	22 August	Choi Hong-man; Ha Yoon-kyung	Ha Yoon-kyung; Choi Hong-man	—	Chae Joo-hwa (Ha Yoon-kyung's manager); Ahn Deok-gi (Choi Hong-man's manager)	—	
413	29 August	Sunwoo Yong-nyeo; Hwang Jae-gyun	Sunwoo Yong-nyeo; Hwang Jae-gyun	—	Lee So-young (Sunwoo Yong-nyeo's manager); Park Shin-woong (Hwang Jae-gyun's manager)	—	
414	5 September	Hyoyeon (Girls' Generation); Jung Eun-ji (Apink)	Hyoyeon; Jung Eun-ji	—	Song Chang-jin (Hyoyeon's manager); Jang Da-hye (Jung Eun-ji's manager)	—	
415	12 September	Lee Eun-gyeol; Heo Seong-beom	Heo Seong-beom; Lee Eun-gyeol	—	Donna (Heo Seong-beom's AI manager); Elena (Lee Eun-gyeol's assistant) & Lee Yu-jin (Lee Eun-gyeol's assistant director)	—	
416	19 September	Choi Ye-na; Yoo Young-woo	Yoo Young-woo; Choi Ye-na	—	Bae Ha-neul (Yoo Young-woo's manager); Yang Won-mo (Choi Ye-na's manager) & Lee Il-gyu (Choi Ye-na's production manager)	—	
417	26 September	Pak Se-ri; Kwak Beom	Pak Se-ri; Kwak Beom	—	Kim Hye-rin, Kim Sun-woo & Gu Seon-ho (Pak Se-ri's managers); Kim Jin-ho & Yu Su-min (Kwak Beom's manager)	—	
418	3 October	Choi Kang-hee; Tarzzan (AllDay Project)	Tarzzan; Choi Kang-hee	—	Noh Yun-seo (Tarzzan's manager)	—	
419	10 October	Hwang Jae-gyun; Simeez (La Chica)	Simeez; Hwang Jae-gyun	—	Lee Yeon-ju (Simeez's choreographer) & Yang Na Kyung (Simeez's assistant); Park Shin-woong (Hwang Jae-gyun's manager)	—	
420	17 October	Oh Sang-uk; WE DEM BOYZ (Ingyoo & Vata)	Oh Sang-uk; WE DEM BOYZ	—	Won Woo-young (Oh Sang-uk's coach); Kamel (WE DEM BOYZ's manager)	—	
421	24 October	Yoo Young-woo; Ateez (Choi San & Hongjoong)	Ateez; Yoo Young-woo	—	Go Deuk-hee (Choi San's manager); Bae Ha-neul (Yoo Young-woo's manager)	—	
422	31 October	AKMU	AKMU	—	Ko Won-jun (AKMU's manager) & Yoo Hyun-ho (AKMU's employee)	—	
423	7 November	Shin Gi-ru; Kim Kwang-jin	Kim Kwang-jin; Shin Gi-ru	—	Oh Se-il (Kim Kwang-jin's stylist), Im Jin-ah & Noh Young-gon (Kim Kwang-jin's elementary school classmates); Moon Hyuk (Shin Gi-ru's manager)	—	
424	14 November	Boom; Wumuti (Xlov)	Xlov; Lee Young-ja, Boom & Chef Yoon Nam-no	—	Park Jae-yong (Xlov's agency CEO); Lee Young-ja (Ingredient manager)	—	

== Ratings ==
- In the ratings below, the highest rating for the show will be in red, and the lowest rating for the show will be in blue each year.

=== 2018 ===
List of ratings (episode 1–34)
- There are two ratings for each episode, as the show airs in two parts.

Omniscient Interfering View : South Korea viewers per episode (millions)

Ep	Episode number											
Ep	1	2	3	4	5	6	7	8	9	10	11	12
1–12	1.154	1.004	1.188	1.097	1.014	1.433	1.16	1.174	1.797	1.507	1.285	1.345
13–24	1.630	1.590	1.746	1.988	1.750	2.103	1.730	1.737	1.475	1.702	2.036	1.560
25–34	1.569	1.631	1.783	1.918	1.806	1.958	2.271	2.279	2.171	2.142	–	
YA	1.639	–										

Source: Audience measurement performed nationwide by Nielsen Media Research (Note: The show is aired in two parts. Only the higher viewership of the episode will be shown.)

Episode #	Broadcast Date	AGB Ratings	
Episode #	Broadcast Date	Part 1	Part 2
1	10 March	4.4%	5.8%
2	17 March	4.5%	5.0%
3	24 March	4.9%	5.8%
4	31 March	5.0%	5.6%
5	7 April	5.0%	7.3%
6	14 April	5.0%	7.3%
7	21 April	6.7%	8.7%
8	28 April	6.2%	9.3%
9	5 May	6.7%	9.4%
10	30 June	5.0%	7.3%
11	7 July	6.1%	7.3%
12	14 July	5.8%	7.2%
13	21 July	5.8%	7.9%
14	28 July	5.9%	8.2%
15	4 August	6.2%	8.0%
16	11 August	6.8%	9.1%
17	18 August	5.5%	8.8%

Episode #	Broadcast Date	AGB Ratings	
Episode #	Broadcast Date	Part 1	Part 2
18	25 August	6.3%	9.5%
19	8 September	6.5%	8.5%
20	15 September	6.6%	8.7%
21	22 September	7.7%	7.2%
22	29 September	5.7%	8.2%
23	6 October	7.1%	9.8%
24	13 October	6.0%	7.4%
25	20 October	6.1%	7.0%
26	27 October	6.0%	7.8%
27	3 November	7.8%	8.8%
28	10 November	7.0%	9.8%
29	17 November	8.6%	9.5%
30	24 November	8.5%	9.3%
31	1 December	9.3%	11.1%
32	8 December	6.4%	10.8%
33	15 December	7.1%	9.9%
34	22 December	6.8%	10.1%

=== 2019 ===
List of ratings (episode 35–84)
- There are two ratings for each episode, as the show airs in two parts.

Omniscient Interfering View : South Korea viewers per episode (millions)

Ep	Episode number												
Ep	1	2	3	4	5	6	7	8	9	10	11	12	13
35–47	2.229	2.205	1.945	1.554	2.231	2.743	2.831	2.365	2.541	1.978	1.994	1.735	1.985
48–60	1.565	1.465	1.665	1.454	1.117	1.225	1.229	1.404	1.652	1.302	1.399	1.234	1.220
61–73	N/A	1.204	1.300	1.473	0.986	1.374	1.106	1.365	1.175	1.215	0.904	0.998	1.044
74–84	1.022	1.05	1.125	0.988	1.137	1.387	1.123	1.499	1.312	N/A	1.001	–	
YA	1.501	–											

Source: Audience measurement performed nationwide by Nielsen Media Research

Episode #	Broadcast Date	AGB Ratings	
Episode #	Broadcast Date	Part 1	Part 2
35	5 January	7.8%	10.6%
36	12 January	7.1%	10.2%
37	19 January	6.3%	8.9%
38	26 January	5.7%	7.2%
39	2 February	9.3%	10.8%
40	9 February	9.7%	12.2%
41	16 February	11.5%	13.3%
42	23 February	9.5%	10.6%
43	2 March	9.5%	12.0%
44	9 March	7.5%	9.8%
45	16 March	8.1%	9.7%
46	23 March	6.9%	8.3%
47	30 March	7.8%	9.8%
48	6 April	7.0%	8.3%
49	13 April	7.7%	7.0%
50	20 April	6.7%	7.4%
51	27 April	5.4%	6.8%

Episode #	Broadcast Date	AGB Ratings	
Episode #	Broadcast Date	Part 1	Part 2
52	4 May	5.7%	6.4%
53	11 May	6.1%	6.7%
54	18 May	4.6%	6.1%
55	1 June	5.2%	6.9%
56	8 June	6.2%	8.3%
57	22 June	4.9%	6.5%
58	29 June	4.3%	6.3%
59	6 July	4.9%	6.3%
60	13 July	4.7%	6.0%
61	20 July	4.6%	4.8%
62	27 July	6.0%	5.8%
63	3 August	6.0%	6.2%
64	10 August	6.1%	7.1%
65	17 August	4.4%	4.9%
66	24 August	4.7%	6.9%
67	31 August	4.8%	5.4%
68	7 September	5.5%	6.9%

Episode #	Broadcast Date	AGB Ratings	
Episode #	Broadcast Date	Part 1	Part 2
69	14 September	5.1%	6.1%
70	21 September	7.0%	5.4%
71	28 September	5.0%	5.2%
72	5 October	4.9%	4.7%
73	12 October	4.7%	5.4%
74	19 October	4.7%	5.5%
75	26 October	4.6%	5.5%
76	2 November	5.8%	6.3%
77	9 November	5.8%	5.6%
78	16 November	5.8%	5.6%
79	23 November	6.4%	7.4%
80	30 November	5.6%	6.2%
81	7 December	6.1%	8.1%
82	14 December	6.8%	7.4%
83	21 December	5.5%	5.4%
84	28 December	5.5%	5.1%

=== 2020 ===
List of ratings (episode 85–134)

The show will be aired in two parts. Only the higher rating of the episode will be shown.

Omniscient Interfering View : South Korea viewers per episode (millions)

Ep	Episode number												
Ep	1	2	3	4	5	6	7	8	9	10	11	12	13
85–97	1.398	1.301	1.531	1.029	1.592	1.558	1.508	1.464	1.419	1.479	1.635	N/A	N/A
98–110	N/A	1.279	1.182	N/A	0.920	1.280	1.265	1.681	1.445	1.200	1.562	1.137	1.486
111–123	1.168	1.063	1.201	1.243	1.408	1.217	1.22	1.269	1.443	N/A	1.305	1.115	1.066
124–134	N/A	1.475	1.153	N/A	1.187	1.093	1.200	1.216	1.351	1.157	1.362	–	
YA	1.308	–											

Source: Audience measurement performed nationwide by Nielsen Media Research

Episode #	Broadcast Date	AGB Ratings
85	4 January	7.1%
86	11 January	6.4%
87	18 January	7.5%
88	25 January	5.0%
89	1 February	7.3%
90	8 February	7.4%
91	15 February	7.0%
92	22 February	6.8%
93	29 February	6.4%
94	7 March	7.1%
95	14 March	7.1%
96	21 March	4.8%
97	28 March	5.4%
98	4 April	4.9%
99	11 April	5.8%
100	18 April	5.5%
101	25 April	4.2%

Episode #	Broadcast Date	AGB Ratings
102	2 May	4.1%
103	9 May	6.0%
104	16 May	6.0%
105	23 May	8.4%
106	30 May	7.0%
107	6 June	6.6%
108	13 June	7.8%
109	20 June	6.4%
110	27 June	7.4%
111	4 July	5.5%
112	11 July	5.6%
113	18 July	5.8%
114	25 July	5.7%
115	1 August	6.7%
116	8 August	5.6%
117	15 August	6.7%
118	22 August	5.5%

Episode #	Broadcast Date	AGB Ratings
119	29 August	6.9%
120	5 September	4.8%
121	12 September	5.9%
122	19 September	5.4%
123	26 September	5.5%
124	3 October	4.2%
125	10 October	6.9%
126	17 October	5.9%
127	24 October	4.9%
128	31 October	6.1%
129	7 November	6.2%
130	14 November	6.1%
131	21 November	6.0%
132	28 November	6.4%
133	5 December	5.2%
134	12 December	6.1%

=== 2021 ===
List of ratings (episode 135–183)

The show will be aired in two parts. Only the higher rating of the episode will be shown.

Omniscient Interfering View : South Korea viewers per episode (millions)

Ep	Episode number												
Ep	1	2	3	4	5	6	7	8	9	10	11	12	13
135–147	1.117	1.302	1.034	1.287	1.026	1.095	0.959	1.532	1.230	0.948	1.221	1.342	0.898
148–160	1.174	1.200	1.028	0.967	0.941	1.258	1.099	0.925	1.037	1.192	1.109	1.118	0.885
161–173	0.977	0.974	1.310	1.356	0.988	1.131	0.907	1.020	1.102	0.924	1.056	0.703	1.134
174–183	1.025	0.989	0.874	0.949	0.806	0.988	0.848	0.945	0.794	0.873	–		
YA	1.053	–											

Source: Audience measurement performed nationwide by Nielsen Media Research

Episode #	Broadcast Date	AGB Ratings
135	9 January	5.7%
136	16 January	5.5%
137	23 January	5.2%
138	30 January	6.0%
139	6 February	4.5%
140	13 February	4.9%
141	20 February	4.5%
142	27 February	7.3%
143	6 March	6.4%
144	13 March	4.4%
145	20 March	6.0%
146	27 March	6.2%
147	3 April	4.6%
148	10 April	5.4%
149	17 April	6.1%
150	24 April	5.3%
151	1 May	4.5%

Episode #	Broadcast Date	AGB Ratings
152	8 May	4.4%
153	15 May	5.8%
154	22 May	5.0%
155	29 May	4.9%
156	5 June	5.8%
157	12 June	6.3%
158	19 June	5.3%
159	26 June	5.3%
160	3 July	4.4%
161	10 July	4.8%
162	17 July	4.4%
163	24 July	5.9%
164	7 August	6.8%
165	14 August	4.9%
166	21 August	5.4%
167	28 August	4.6%
168	4 September	5.2%

Episode #	Broadcast Date	AGB Ratings
169	11 September	4.8%
170	18 September	4.7%
171	25 September	5.2%
172	2 October	3.6%
173	9 October	5.4%
174	16 October	4.9%
175	23 October	4.8%
176	30 October	4.4%
177	6 November	4.4%
178	13 November	4.1%
179	20 November	5.0%
180	27 November	4.5%
181	4 December	5.2%
182	11 December	4.5%
183	18 December	4.8%

=== 2022 ===
List of ratings (episode 184–228)

Omniscient Interfering View : South Korea viewers per episode (thousands)

Ep	Episode number											
Ep	1	2	3	4	5	6	7	8	9	10	11	12
184–195	939	994	959	936	N/A	983	969	834	902	983	801	641
196–207	765	746	844	781	872	972	912	806	941	767	950	816
208–219	850	812	932	1028	994	1004	932	1067	998	964	878	826
220–228	818	802	1066	895	893	741	822	652	594	–		
YA	879	–										

Source: Audience measurement performed nationwide by Nielsen Media Research

Episode #	Broadcast Date	AGB Ratings
184	8 January	4.8%
185	15 January	5.2%
186	22 January	4.6%
187	29 January	5.2%
188	19 February	4.2%
189	26 February	5.2%
190	12 March	4.7%
191	19 March	4.5%
192	26 March	4.8%
193	2 April	4.6%
194	9 April	4.0%
195	16 April	4.1%
196	23 April	4.4%
197	30 April	4.1%
198	7 May	4.4%

Episode #	Broadcast Date	AGB Ratings
199	14 May	4.0%
200	21 May	4.2%
201	28 May	4.6%
202	4 June	5.2%
203	11 June	4.1%
204	18 June	5.0%
205	25 June	4.0%
206	2 July	5.0%
207	9 July	4.0%
208	16 July	4.3%
209	23 July	4.1%
210	30 July	4.5%
211	6 August	5.2%
212	13 August	5.3%
213	20 August	5.0%

Episode #	Broadcast Date	AGB Ratings
214	27 August	4.8%
215	3 September	5.3%
216	10 September	5.1%
217	17 September	5.3%
218	24 September	4.2%
219	1 October	4.4%
220	8 October	4.3%
221	15 October	3.9%
222	22 October	5.4%
223	29 October	5.0%
224	12 November	4.6%
225	19 November	4.1%
226	26 November	4.1%
227	17 December	3.0%
228	24 December	2.9%

=== 2023 ===
List of ratings (episode 229–279)

Omniscient Interfering View : South Korea viewers per episode (thousands)

Ep	Episode number												
Ep	1	2	3	4	5	6	7	8	9	10	11	12	13
229–241	645	867	N/A	936	878	993	1061	898	884	733	823	890	774
242–254	698	865	843	848	752	661	703	662	746	791	740	806	652
255–267	700	730	740	681	765	792	682	1014	815	652	745	N/A	873
268–279	720	771	770	753	811	705	675	624	643	N/A	N/A	N/A	–
YA	778	–											

Source: Audience measurement performed nationwide by Nielsen Media Research

Episode #	Broadcast Date	AGB Ratings
229	7 January	3.4%
230	14 January	5.0%
231	21 January	2.9%
232	28 January	4.8%
233	4 February	4.4%
234	11 February	5.4%
235	18 February	5.2%
236	25 February	4.7%
237	4 March	4.8%
238	11 March	3.6%
239	18 March	4.4%
240	25 March	4.7%
241	1 April	4.3%
242	8 April	3.5%
243	15 April	4.7%
244	22 April	4.5%
245	29 April	4.3%

Episode #	Broadcast Date	AGB Ratings
246	6 May	4.2%
247	13 May	3.5%
248	20 May	3.6%
249	27 May	3.4%
250	3 June	3.7%
251	10 June	4.2%
252	17 June	4.0%
253	24 June	4.1%
254	1 July	3.5%
255	8 July	3.9%
256	15 July	3.9%
257	29 July	3.9%
258	5 August	3.1%
259	12 August	4.1%
260	19 August	3.7%
261	26 August	3.7%
262	2 September	4.7%

Episode #	Broadcast Date	AGB Ratings
263	9 September	3.8%
264	16 September	3.4%
265	23 September	3.7%
266	30 September	3.3%
267	7 October	4.7%
268	14 October	3.7%
269	21 October	3.7%
270	28 October	3.9%
271	4 November	4.1%
272	11 November	4.2%
273	18 November	3.7%
274	25 November	3.5%
275	2 December	3.8%
276	9 December	3.5%
277	16 December	4.6%
278	23 December	3.3%
279	30 December	2.6%

=== 2024 ===
List of ratings (episode 280–327)

Omniscient Interfering View : South Korea viewers per episode (thousands)

Ep	Episode number											
Ep	1	2	3	4	5	6	7	8	9	10	11	12
280–292	807	765	1030	977	809	800	942	727	748	885	778	768
293–305	857	663	755	825	841	872	804	717	643	647	N/A	563
306–318	624	641	681	689	709	717	714	715	752	779	N/A	N/A
319–327	694	590	601	728	596	700	566	N/A	680	530	N/A	N/A
YA	736.4	–										

Source: Audience measurement performed nationwide by Nielsen Media Research

Episode #	Broadcast Date	AGB Ratings
280	6 January	4.4%
281	13 January	3.8%
282	20 January	5.1%
283	27 January	5.5%
284	3 February	4.4%
285	10 February	3.9%
286	17 February	4.9%
287	24 February	3.5%
288	2 March	4.0%
289	9 March	4.3%
290	16 March	3.7%
291	23 March	3.7%
292	30 March	4.1%
293	6 April	3.5%
294	13 April	3.9%
295	20 April	4.0%

Episode #	Broadcast Date	AGB Ratings
296	27 April	4.2%
297	4 May	4.5%
298	11 May	4.4%
299	18 May	3.8%
300	25 May	3.5%
301	1 June	3.3%
302	8 June	2.9%
303	15 June	3.1%
304	22 June	3.3%
305	29 June	3.5%
306	6 July	3.5%
307	13 July	3.5%
308	20 July	3.7%
309	17 August	3.4%
310	24 August	3.3%
311	31 August	3.8%

Episode #	Broadcast Date	AGB Ratings
312	7 September	3.7%
313	14 September	3.8%
314	21 September	2.9%
315	28 September	2.8%
316	5 October	3.6%
317	12 October	3.1%
318	19 October	3.3%
319	26 October	3.5%
320	2 November	3.1%
321	9 November	3.8%
322	16 November	2.6%
323	23 November	2.4%
324	30 November	3.2%
325	14 December	2.9%
326	21 December	2.6%
327	28 December	2.4%

=== 2025 ===
List of ratings (episode 328–378)

Omniscient Interfering View : South Korea viewers per episode (thousands)

Ep	Episode number												
Ep	1	2	3	4	5	6	7	8	9	10	11	12	13
328–340	710	662	899	622	839	853	675	699	752	771	662	747	531
341–353	575	603	549	423	524	492	432	474	521	571	621	704	666
354–366	639	667	648	706	554	807	651	585	611	667	619	607	562
367–378	595	563	541	456	491	585	569	629	567	759	809	642	–
YA	629.5	–											

Source: Audience measurement performed nationwide by Nielsen Media Research

Episode #	Broadcast Date	AGB Ratings
328	4 January	3.4%
329	11 January	3.1%
330	18 January	4.3%
331	25 January	2.9%
332	1 February	4.1%
333	8 February	4.3%
334	15 February	3.3%
335	22 February	3.4%
336	1 March	3.9%
337	8 March	3.7%
338	15 March	3.0%
339	22 March	3.7%
340	29 March	2.7%
341	5 April	2.8%
342	12 April	2.9%
343	19 April	2.5%
344	26 April	2.1%

Episode #	Broadcast Date	AGB Ratings
345	3 May	2.5%
346	10 May	2.3%
347	17 May	1.9%
348	24 May	2.2%
349	31 May	2.4%
350	7 June	2.5%
351	14 June	3.0%
352	21 June	3.4%
353	28 June	3.3%
354	5 July	3.2%
355	12 July	3.3%
356	19 July	3.0%
357	26 July	3.5%
358	2 August	2.3%
359	9 August	3.8%
360	16 August	3.3%
361	23 August	2.8%

Episode #	Broadcast Date	AGB Ratings
362	30 August	2.9%
363	6 September	3.3%
364	13 September	3.0%
365	20 September	2.9%
366	27 September	2.9%
367	4 October	2.7%
368	11 October	2.7%
369	18 October	2.5%
370	25 October	2.1%
371	1 November	2.4%
372	8 November	2.9%
373	22 November	2.8%
374	29 November	2.9%
375	6 December	2.8%
376	13 December	3.7%
377	20 December	3.7%
378	27 December	3.4%

=== 2026 ===
List of ratings (episode 379–present)

Omniscient Interfering View : South Korea viewers per episode (thousands)

Ep	Episode number												
Ep	1	2	3	4	5	6	7	8	9	10	11	12	13
379–391	698	792	744	697	669	741	716	623	761	624	601	506	581
392–404	566	630	730	607	585	778	613	605	824	638	474	666	612
405–417	627	596	514	737	743	600	662	775	710	760	515	487	589
418–430	576	561	600	511	700	436	537	476	TBD	TBD	TBD	TBD	TBD
YA	TBD	–											

Source: Audience measurement performed nationwide by Nielsen Media Research

Episode #	Broadcast Date	AGB Ratings
379	3 January	3.5%
380	10 January	3.7%
381	17 January	3.4%
382	24 January	3.6%
383	31 January	3.4%
384	7 February	3.5%
385	14 February	3.4%
386	21 February	3.0%
387	28 February	3.6%
388	7 March	2.8%
389	14 March	2.8%
390	21 March	2.4%
391	28 March	3.0%
392	4 April	2.8%
393	11 April	3.0%
394	18 April	3.7%
395	25 April	2.8%

Episode #	Broadcast Date	AGB Ratings
396	2 May	3.0%
397	9 May	4.2%
398	16 May	2.9%
399	23 May	3.0%
400	30 May	4.1%
401	6 June	3.3%
402	13 June	2.1%
403	20 June	3.0%
404	27 June	3.0%
405	4 July	2.7%
406	11 July	2.7%
407	18 July	2.5%
408	25 July	3.4%
409	1 August	3.6%
410	8 August	2.9%
411	15 August	3.1%
412	22 August	3.6%

Episode #	Broadcast Date	AGB Ratings
413	29 August	3.4%
414	5 September	3.6%
415	12 September	2.5%
416	19 September	2.3%
417	26 September	2.8%
418	3 October	2.9%
419	10 October	2.6%
420	17 October	2.8%
421	24 October	2.4%
422	31 October	3.4%
423	7 November	2.2%
424	14 November	2.5%
425	21 November	2.4%

== Awards and nominations ==
Year	Award	Category	Recipients	Result	Ref
2018	54th Baeksang Arts Awards	Best Variety Performer – Female	Song Eun-i	Won	
2018	18th MBC Entertainment Awards	Grand Prize (Daesang)	Lee Young-ja	Won	
2018	18th MBC Entertainment Awards	Grand Prize (Daesang)	Jun Hyun-moo	Nominated	
2018	18th MBC Entertainment Awards	Top Excellence Award, Variety Category (Male)	Yang Se-hyung	Nominated	
2018	18th MBC Entertainment Awards	Top Excellence Award, Variety Category (Female)	Song Eun-i	Won	
2018	18th MBC Entertainment Awards	Excellence Award, Variety Category (Male)	Park Sung-kwang	Won	
2018	18th MBC Entertainment Awards	Excellence Award, Variety Category (Male)	Yoo Byung-jae	Nominated	
2018	18th MBC Entertainment Awards	Scriptwriter of the Year	Yeo Hyun-jeon	Won	
2018	18th MBC Entertainment Awards	Popularity Award	Im Song (Park Sung-kwang's manager); Kang Hyun-seok (Lee Seung-yoon's manager); Song Sung-ho (Lee Young-ja's manager); Yoo Gyu-seon (Yoo Byung-jae's manager)	Won	
2018	18th MBC Entertainment Awards	Best Entertainer Award (Variety)	Yoo Byung-jae	Won	
2018	18th MBC Entertainment Awards	Entertainer of the Year Award	Jun Hyun-moo	Won	
2018	18th MBC Entertainment Awards	Entertainer of the Year Award	Lee Young-ja	Won	
2018	18th MBC Entertainment Awards	Best Couple Award	Park Sung-kwang & Im Song (Park Sung-kwang's manager)	Won	
2018	18th MBC Entertainment Awards	Best Couple Award	Lee Young-ja & Song Sung-ho (Lee Young-ja's manager)	Nominated	
2018	18th MBC Entertainment Awards	Variety Show of the Year Award	Omniscient Interfering View	Nominated	
2019	55th Baeksang Arts Awards	Best Variety Performer – Female	Lee Young-ja	Won	
2019	55th Baeksang Arts Awards	Best Variety Performer – Male	Yoo Byung-jae	Nominated	
2019	55th Baeksang Arts Awards	Best Entertainment Program	Omniscient Interfering View	Won	
2019	19th MBC Entertainment Awards	Grand Prize (Daesang)	Lee Young-ja	Nominated	
2019	19th MBC Entertainment Awards	Grand Prize (Daesang)	Jun Hyun-moo	Nominated	
2019	19th MBC Entertainment Awards	Program of the Year	Omniscient Interfering View	Nominated	
2019	19th MBC Entertainment Awards	Top Excellence Award, Variety Category (Male)	Yang Se-hyung	Won	
2019	19th MBC Entertainment Awards	Top Excellence Award, Variety Category (Female)	Song Eun-i	Won	
2019	19th MBC Entertainment Awards	Excellence Award, Variety Category (Male)	Yoo Byung-jae	Won	
2019	19th MBC Entertainment Awards	Rookie Award, Variety Category (Male)	Jang Sung-kyu	Won	
2019	19th MBC Entertainment Awards	Rookie Award, Variety Category (Female)	Hong Hyun Hee	Won	
2019	19th MBC Entertainment Awards	Rookie Award, Variety Category (Female)	Song Ga-in	Nominated	
2019	19th MBC Entertainment Awards	Entertainer of the Year	Lee Young-ja	Won	
2019	19th MBC Entertainment Awards	Entertainer of the Year	Jun Hyun-moo	Won	
2020	20th MBC Entertainment Awards	Grand Prize (Daesang)	Lee Young-ja	Nominated	
2020	20th MBC Entertainment Awards	Program of the Year	Omniscient Interfering View	Nominated	
2020	20th MBC Entertainment Awards	Top Excellence Award, Variety Category (Male)	Yang Se-hyung	Won	
2020	20th MBC Entertainment Awards	Excellence Award, Variety Category (Female)	Jessi	Won	
2020	20th MBC Entertainment Awards	Entertainer of the Year	Lee Young-ja	Won	
2020	20th MBC Entertainment Awards	Entertainer of the Year	Jun Hyun-moo	Won	
2020	20th MBC Entertainment Awards	Best Couple Award	Lee Young-ja & Jun Hyun-moo	Nominated	
2020	20th MBC Entertainment Awards	Best Dresser Award	Norazo	Won	
2020	20th MBC Entertainment Awards	Best Teamwork Award	Omniscient Interfering View	Won	
2020	20th MBC Entertainment Awards	Rookie Award, Variety Category (Female)	Go Eun-ah	Won	
2020	20th MBC Entertainment Awards	Rookie Award, Variety Category (Male)	Kim Kang-hoon	Won	
2021	57th Baeksang Arts Awards	Best Variety Performer – Female	Hong Hyun Hee	Nominated	
2021	Brand of the Year Awards	Observational Variety Show	Omniscient Interfering View	Won	
2021	21st MBC Entertainment Awards	Entertainer of the Year	Lee Young-ja	Won	
2021	21st MBC Entertainment Awards	Entertainer of the Year	Jun Hyun-moo	Won	
2021	21st MBC Entertainment Awards	Excellence Award, Variety Category (Female)	Hong Hyun Hee	Won	
2021	21st MBC Entertainment Awards	Best Entertainer Award	Yoo Byung-jae	Won	
2021	21st MBC Entertainment Awards	Best Entertainer Award	Yang Se-hyung	Won	
2021	21st MBC Entertainment Awards	Best Couple Award	Yang Se-hyung & Yoo Byung-jae	Nominated	
2021	21st MBC Entertainment Awards	Best Couple Award	Hong Hyun Hee & Im Jeong-su	Nominated	
2022	58th Baeksang Arts Awards	Best Variety Performer – Female	Song Eun-i	Nominated	
2022	49th Korean Broadcasting Awards	Best Performer Award	Omniscient Interfering View	Won	
2022	22nd MBC Entertainment Awards	Grand Prize (Daesang)	Jun Hyun-moo	Won	
2022	22nd MBC Entertainment Awards	Grand Prize (Daesang)	Lee Young-ja	Nominated	
2022	22nd MBC Entertainment Awards	Entertainer of the Year Award	Jun Hyun-moo	Won	
2022	22nd MBC Entertainment Awards	Entertainer of the Year Award	Lee Young-ja	Won	
2022	22nd MBC Entertainment Awards	Top Excellence Award, Variety Category (Female)	Song Eun-i & Hong Hyun Hee	Nominated	
2022	22nd MBC Entertainment Awards	Excellence Award, Variety Category (Female)	Lee Guk-joo	Won	
2022	22nd MBC Entertainment Awards	Rookie Award, Variety Category (Male)	Kwon Yul & Kim Ho-young	Nominated	
2022	22nd MBC Entertainment Awards	Rookie Award, Variety Category (Female)	Uhm Hyun-kyung & Patricia Yiombi	Nominated	
2022	22nd MBC Entertainment Awards	Best Entertainer Award	Kwon Yul	Won	
2022	22nd MBC Entertainment Awards	Multiplayer Award	Hong Hyun Hee	Won	
2022	22nd MBC Entertainment Awards	Best Couple Award	Jonathan Yiombi & Patricia Yiombi	Nominated	
2022	22nd MBC Entertainment Awards	Best Couple Award	Jun Hyun-moo & Lee Young-ja	Nominated	
2023	23rd MBC Entertainment Awards	Entertainer of the Year Award	Jun Hyun-moo	Won	
2023	23rd MBC Entertainment Awards	Achievement Award	Lee Young-ja	Won	
2023	23rd MBC Entertainment Awards	Best Entertainer Award (Show/Variety)	Yang Se-hyung	Won	
2023	23rd MBC Entertainment Awards	Multiplayer Award	Yoo Byung-jae	Won	
2023	23rd MBC Entertainment Awards	Rookie Award, Variety Category (Male)	Dex	Won	
2023	23rd MBC Entertainment Awards	Rookie Award, Variety Category (Female)	Poongja	Won	
2024	24th MBC Entertainment Awards	Grand Prize (Daesang)	Jun Hyun-moo	Won	
2024	24th MBC Entertainment Awards	Entertainer of the Year Award	Jun Hyun-moo	Won	
2024	24th MBC Entertainment Awards	Excellence Award, Variety Category (Female)	Hong Hyun Hee	Won	
2024	24th MBC Entertainment Awards	Rookie Award, Variety Category (Female)	Choi Kang-hee	Won	
2024	24th MBC Entertainment Awards	Best Entertainer Award (Reality)	Choi Daniel	Won	
2024	24th MBC Entertainment Awards	Best Couple Award	Song Ji-eun & Park Wi	Nominated	
2024	24th MBC Entertainment Awards	Best Couple Award	Shin Gi-ru, Lee Guk-joo, Poongja	Nominated	
2025	25th MBC Entertainment Awards	Entertainer of the Year Award	Jun Hyun-moo	Won	
2025	25th MBC Entertainment Awards	Popularity Award (Female)	Tzuyang	Won	
2025	25th MBC Entertainment Awards	Rookie of the Year Award	Choi Hong-man	Won	

== Controversies ==
=== 2018 ===
==== Kim Saeng-min ====
On 2 April, Korean media outlet Dispatch broke a story about Kim Saeng-min harassing two female staff members at a party in 2008. One of the afflicted staff members received an apology in 2008, whilst the other spoke about trying to raise the issue, but being slowly pushed out of the program by other staff members, before she eventually quit her job as a staff member on the program.

Upon being contacted by Dispatch regarding the story, Kim Saeng-min apologized to the former staff member, and later released an official apology through his agency. He then withdrew from all of his current TV and radio programs, including Omniscient Interfering View.

==== Fishcake controversy ====
During the 5 May broadcast, the show used a censored clip from MBC News coverage of the Sewol Ferry disaster with the headline "Lee Young-ja makes shocking confession while eating fish cakes". This sparked a controversy, as users of the controversial online community Ilbe had used the term "fish cakes" to refer to the victims of the Ferry disaster. Both the production staff and the MBC president immediately apologized, and launched an internal investigation of the issue. The program was temporarily halted, and went off-air for 7 weeks before returning to air on 30 June 2018.

=== 2019 ===
==== Fraud case ====
During the 20 July broadcast, the show displayed a subtitle notice to alert the audiences that "the production team does not ask for money on the pretext of filming". This was due to an incident of a scammer who had been masquerading as a member of the production crew and attempted to solicit large amounts of money from shopkeepers and business owners with the promise of advertising their goods or services.

== See also ==
- I Live Alone
- On & Off
