= My Little Television V2 =

South Korean television series

- Genre: Entertainment
- Country of origin: South Korea
- Original language: Korean
- No. of episodes: 41

Production
- Production location: South Korea
- Running time: 80 minutes

Original release
- Network: MBC, Twitch
- Release: March 29, 2019 – January 20, 2020

My Little Television V2 (Korean: 마이 리틀 텔레비전 V2) is a South Korean television program. The program is the second season of My Little Television. The raw live broadcasting of various channels would air via Twitch on Saturdays (KST) every two weeks, as well as via MBC on every Friday 21:50 (KST) starting March 29, 2019.

MBC announced that broadcast of the show on the TV channel would have its airtime changed to Mondays at 21:50 (KST) starting from October 21, 2019.

On January 2, 2020 MBC confirmed that the show would have its last live stream session on January 4, and the final episode on MBC would be aired on January 20.

== Airtime ==
Air date	Airtime
March 29, 2019 – October 11, 2019	Fridays at 9:50 PM KST
October 21, 2019 – January 20, 2020	Mondays at 9:50 PM KST

== Cast ==
=== Former ===
Name	Role	Episode
An Yu-jin (IZ*ONE and Ive)	Youngest Daughter (막내딸)	1–31; absent in episodes 14-25, 28-29
Song Ha-young (fromis 9)	Youngest Daughter (막내딸)	14-25, 28-29

== Episodes ==
=== 2019 ===
Episode 1 & 2 (MLT-201)
- Live broadcast: March 15, 2019
- TV broadcast: March 29 & April 5, 2019
- The only live broadcast where the Control Room is seen; it will not be seen in subsequent live broadcasts

Cast	Broadcast title	Broadcast topic	Guest(s)	Highest number of viewers recorded	Target donation amount	Final donation amount
Kang Boo-ja	I Love Soccer (아이러브 사커)	Soccer	Han Jun-hee (KBS soccer commentator); Jo Woo-jong (Freelancer, former announcer)	14,225	₩5,000,000	₩9,276,000
Kim Gu-ra	Gu Live (구라이브)	Interview	Park Jie-won; Yoon Seon-hee (North Korean cuisine specialty chef)	9,364	₩5,000,000	₩9,276,000
Jeong Hyeong-don; Kim Dong-hyun	DongJeongNam TV (동정남 TV) (Note: 동정남 means Sympathetic Men.)	Comedy; Brazilian jiu-jitsu	Jo Nam-jin (Mixed martial artist); Kwon Hae-bom (Guinea Pig PD)	22,371	₩5,000,000	₩9,276,000
Kim Poong	Cooking Is Easy, Right? (요리 참 쉽죠?)	Cooking	Geum Joo-hyun (Nurse); Chae Jong-young (Firefighter)	26,831	₩5,000,000	₩9,276,000
Shownu (Monsta X)	Shownu's Gym Home Training (Shownu's Gym 홈 트레이닝)	Work Out; Exercise	Geum Joo-hyun (Nurse); Chae Jong-young (Firefighter)	10,749	₩5,000,000	₩9,276,000

Episode 3 & 4 (MLT-202)
- Live broadcast: April 6, 2019
- TV broadcast: April 12 & 19, 2019

Cast	Broadcast title	Broadcast topic	Guest(s)	Highest number of viewers recorded	Target donation amount	Final donation amount
Hong Jin-young	Trot Survival Hong-dition (트롯 서바이벌 홍디션)	Singing	GB9	11,737	₩5,000,000	₩6,766,000
Kim Gu-ra	Gu Live (구라이브)	Mental Health	Hwang Sang-min (Psychologist); Shin Bong-sun	5,300	₩5,000,000	₩6,766,000
Jeong Hyeong-don; Kim Dong-hyun	DongJeongNam TV (동정남 TV)	Comedy; Brazilian jiu-jitsu	Jo Nam-jin (Mixed martial artist); Kwon Do-woo (FD); Shownu	8,632	₩5,000,000	₩6,766,000
Shiho Yano	Beauty Class (뷰티 클래스)	Yoga; Meditation	Woo Ji-seok (Japanese translator); Tommy (Boxing trainer); Jo Nam-jin (Mixed martial artist)	11,828	₩5,000,000	₩6,766,000
Shownu	Costume Machine Dance (코스튬 기계 댄스)	Dance	Na Ha-eun; Lee Chae-yeon (IZ*ONE); Kwon Hae-bom (Guinea Pig PD)	17,740	₩5,000,000	₩6,766,000

Episode 5 & 6 (MLT-203)
- Live broadcast: April 20, 2019
- TV broadcast: April 26 & May 3, 2019

Cast	Broadcast title	Broadcast topic	Guest(s)	Highest number of viewers recorded	Target donation amount	Final donation amount
Kim Soo-mi	Creator Challenge Journal (크리에이터 도전기)	Reality Show	Jang Dong-min	5,331	₩5,000,000	₩5,003,100
Kim Gu-ra	Gu Live (구라이브)	Sexuality	Kang Dong-woo (Sex medical science specialist); Jang Young-ran	3,859	₩5,000,000	₩5,003,100
Jeong Hyeong-don; Kim Dong-hyun	DongJeongNam TV (동정남 TV)	Comedy; Brazilian jiu-jitsu	Jo Nam-jin (Mixed martial artist); Kwon Do-woo (FD)	5,106	₩5,000,000	₩5,003,100
Jeong Yu-mi	Green's Unnie's Special Day (그린이 언니의 특별한 하루)	Companion Animals	Yoon Kyung-hee (Companion animal grooming specialist)	5,116	₩5,000,000	₩5,003,100
Mr. Doodle (Note: Artist)	Welcome To Doodle World (웰컴 투 '두들 월드')	Art	—N/a	6,626	₩5,000,000	₩5,003,100

Episode 7 & 8 (MLT-204)
- Live broadcast: May 4, 2019
- TV broadcast: May 10 & 17, 2019
- The number of broadcasting channels is reduced to four starting from this live broadcast.

Cast	Broadcast title	Broadcast topic	Guest(s)	Highest number of viewers recorded	Target donation amount	Final donation amount
Kim Soo-mi	Creator Challenge Journal V2 (크리에이터 도전기 V2)	VR; ASMR; Dancesport; Unboxing	Jang Dong-min; Park Ji-woo; Kim Woong-gyeom (Dancesport contestant); Uhm Hye-ri (Dancesport contestant); Yoo Min-sang (Comedian); Roh Ji-sun (fromis 9)	6,524	₩5,000,000	₩12,561,000
Kim Gu-ra	Gu Live (구라이브)	Hair Design	Jang Young-ran; L (Hair designer); Yook Joong-wan (Singer)	3,080	₩5,000,000	₩12,561,000
Jeong Hyeong-don; Kim Dong-hyun	DongJeongNam TV (동정남 TV)	Comedy; Brazilian jiu-jitsu	Jo Nam-jin (Mixed martial artist); Sung Seung-heon (Television personality)	5,106	₩5,000,000	₩12,561,000
Choi Tae-seong (Note: History lecturer)	Our History That Meets Food (음식으로 만나는 우리역사 쿡(Cook) 사(史))	History; Cooking	Roh Ji-sun (fromis 9); Yoo Min-sang (Comedian); Yoon Seon-hee (North Korean cuisine specialty chef); Jang Dong-min; Park Kyung-rae (Chef)	10,084	₩5,000,000	₩12,561,000

Episode 9, 10 & 11 (MLT-205)
- Live broadcast: May 18 & 19, 2019
- TV broadcast: May 24, 31 & June 7, 2019
- For this live broadcast, the four channels will be done in a relay.
- First overseas live broadcast in Seasons 1 & 2 combined

Cast	Broadcast title	Broadcast topic	Guest(s)	Highest number of viewers recorded	Target donation amount	Final donation amount
Kang Boo-ja	Kang Boo-ja Soccer Commentator Countdown (강부자 축구 해설위원 초읽기)	Soccer	Jo Woo-jong (Freelancer, former announcer); Kim Dong-wan (SBS Sports football commentator); Min Sang-gi	3,388	₩5,000,000	₩5,850,000
Kim Gu-ra	Gu Live (구라이브)	Trot	Jo Young-gu (Television personality); Jang Young-ran; Song Ga-in (Trot singer); Park Mi-hyun (Singing lecturer); Jeon Ji-yeon (Traditional Korean musician)	5,090	₩5,000,000	₩5,850,000
YakKurt (Note: YouTuber who answers questions about medicine)	YakTan Broadcast (약탄방송)	Medicine	Yoo Min-sang (Comedian); Han Cho-im (CAMILA)	3,731	₩5,000,000	₩5,850,000
Shiho Yano	Hawaii Life (하와이 라이프)	Reality Show; Surfing	Choo Sa-rang (Daughter of Choo Sung-hoon); Woo Ji-seok (Japanese translator); Kwon Hae-bom (Guinea Pig PD); Kwon Do-woo (FD)	5,496	₩5,000,000	₩5,850,000

Episode 12 & 13 (MLT-206)
- Live broadcast: June 1, 2019
- TV broadcast: June 14 & 21, 2019

Cast	Broadcast title	Broadcast topic	Guest(s)	Highest number of viewers recorded	Target donation amount	Final donation amount
Kim Young-ok	Silver-haired Super Insider Kim Young-ok's MLT Challenge Journal (은발의 핵인싸 김영옥의 마리텔 도전기)	VR; Cooking; Fashion	Jang Dong-min	6,180	₩5,000,000	₩8,216,000
Kim Gu-ra	Gu Live (구라이브)	Hair Baldness	Yum Kyung-hwan (Comedian); Jang Young-ran; Kwon Do-woo (FD); Jo Sang-hyun (Custom wig specialist shop CEO); Ko Do-yeon (Beauty centre and Waxing Academy CEO)	5,090	₩5,000,000	₩8,216,000
Jeong Hyeong-don; Jang Sung-kyu (Note: Freelancer, former announcer)	Bring Anything and Come At Me! PvP King of the King (무엇이든 덤벼보세요! '현피 끝판왕')	Battle	Kang Hye-won (IZ*ONE)	13,729	₩5,000,000	₩8,216,000
YakKurt	YakTan Broadcast (약탄방송)	Medicine	Yoo Min-sang (Comedian); Kwon Hae-bom (Guinea Pig PD); Kwon Do-woo (FD)	3,373	₩5,000,000	₩8,216,000

Episode 14 & 15 (MLT-207)
- Live broadcast: June 15, 2019
- TV broadcast: June 28 & July 5, 2019
- Song Ha-young (fromis 9) stood in for Ahn Yu-jin due to the latter attending IZ*ONE's Thailand concert.

Cast	Broadcast title	Broadcast topic	Guest(s)	Highest number of viewers recorded	Target donation amount	Final donation amount
Shin Ae-ryun (Note: Creative director of clothing franchise andar)	Working Mom's Brilliant Outing (워킹맘의 화려한 외출)	Parenting; Yoga; Fashion	Oh Ye-seo (Shin Ae-ryun's daughter); Kwon Hae-bom (Guinea Pig PD); So In-ji (PD)	2,939	₩5,000,000	₩22,798,301
Kim Gu-ra	Gu Live (구라이브)	Trot; Toreutics; Cooking	Song Ga-in (Trot singer); Jang Young-ran; Lee Jeong-yong (Comedian); Kim So-yoo (Trot singer)	2,886	₩5,000,000	₩22,798,301
Jeong Hyeong-don; Jang Sung-kyu	Bring Anything and Come At Me! PvP King of the King (무엇이든 덤벼보세요! '현피 끝판왕')	Battle	Nancy (Momoland); Bae Jin-young (Sleep clinic medical laboratory scientist)	5,982	₩5,000,000	₩22,798,301
Choi Tae-seong	Our History That Meets Food (음식으로 만나는 우리역사 쿡(Cook) 사(史))	History; Cooking	DinDin; Sam Okyere	2,281	₩5,000,000	₩22,798,301

Episode 16 & 17 (MLT-208)
- Live broadcast: June 29, 2019
- TV broadcast: July 12 & 19, 2019
- Song Ha-young (fromis 9) stood in for Ahn Yu-jin due to the latter attending IZ*ONE's Taiwan concert.
- This live broadcast is a Horror Special.

Cast	Broadcast title	Broadcast topic	Guest(s)	Highest number of viewers recorded	Target donation amount	Final donation amount
Kim Soo-mi	Creator Challenge Journal V2 (크리에이터 도전기 V2)	Eye Tracking; Cooking; Hypnosis	Jang Dong-min	1,335	₩5,000,000	₩5,944,800
Kim Gu-ra	Gu Live (구라이브)	Body Painting; Animal	Jang Young-ran; Kim Kyung-jin (Comedian)	1,664	₩5,000,000	₩5,944,800
Jeong Hyeong-don; Jang Sung-kyu	Bring Anything and Come At Me! PvP King of the King (무엇이든 덤벼보세요! '현피 끝판왕')	Battle	Yuqi ((G)I-DLE); Kim Soo-mi; Jang Dong-min	4,975	₩5,000,000	₩5,944,800
AB6IX (Note: Park Woo-jin is absent due to an ankle injury.)	Zombie Class (좀비 교실)	Reality Show; Acting	Lee Mi-do; Jeon Young (Centipedz leader, zombie dance choreographer); Chae Rin (Rookie actress)	3,315	₩5,000,000	₩5,944,800

Episode 18 & 19 (MLT-209)
- Live broadcast: July 13, 2019
- TV broadcast: July 26 & August 2, 2019
- Song Ha-young (fromis 9) stood in for Ahn Yu-jin due to the latter attending IZ*ONE's Hong Kong concert.

Cast	Broadcast title	Broadcast topic	Guest(s)	Highest number of viewers recorded	Target donation amount	Final donation amount
EXO-SC (세훈&찬열)	It's Ipdeok Time (잇츠 입덕 타임)	Companion Animals; Cooking	Lee Won-il; Kwon Hae-bom (Guinea Pig PD); Nam Ji-hye (Zookeeper from Everland); Shin Beom (Special animals specialist)	23,722	₩5,000,000	₩27,136,400
Kim Gu-ra	Gu Live (구라이브)	Massage; Posture Correction	Jang Young-ran; Lee Seung-yoon (Comedian); Kim Moo-yeol (Sports massage therapist); Kim Hyung-min (Traditional doctor); Kwon Hae-bom (Guinea Pig PD)	14,166	₩5,000,000	₩27,136,400
Jeong Hyeong-don; Jang Sung-kyu	Bring Anything and Come At Me! PvP King of the King (무엇이든 덤벼보세요! '현피 끝판왕')	Battle	EXY (Cosmic Girls); Ahn Il-kwon (Comedian)	5,696	₩5,000,000	₩27,136,400
Yeo Esther (Note: Medical doctor)	Inner Beauty Classroom (이너뷰티 교실)	Health	Moon Se-yoon; Cho Myung-je (Camera director); So In-ji (PD)	1,631	₩5,000,000	₩27,136,400

Episode 20 & 21 (MLT-210)
- Live broadcast: July 27, 2019
- TV broadcast: August 9 & 16, 2019
- Song Ha-young (fromis 9) stood in for Ahn Yu-jin due to the latter attending IZ*ONE's Japan schedules.
- The entire house meant for all live broadcasts encountered a power outage, causing all live broadcasts to be cut off.

Cast	Broadcast title	Broadcast topic	Guest(s)	Highest number of viewers recorded
Ddotty (Note: YouTuber, mainly on Minecraft)	Age Groups Capturing Project (전 연령대 사로잡기 프로젝트)	Kids; Teenagers; Adults	Ji Sang-ryeol; Yoon Hoo (Son of Yoon Min-soo); Na Ha-eun	4,986
Kim Gu-ra	Gu Live (구라이브)	Detoxification; Zombie Dance	Jang Young-ran; Jo Young-gu (Television personality)	1,040
Jeong Hyeong-don; Jang Sung-kyu	Bring Anything and Come At Me! PvP King of the King (무엇이든 덤벼보세요! '현피 끝판왕')	Battle	EXY (Cosmic Girls)	4,398
Swings; DinDin	Eat, Sing, Love (먹고 노래하고 사랑하라)	Cooking; Rap	sAewoo (Music producer)	1,759

Episode 22 & 23 (MLT-211)
- Live broadcast: August 10, 2019
- TV broadcast: August 23 & 30, 2019
- Song Ha-young (fromis 9) stood in for Ahn Yu-jin due to the latter attending IZ*ONE's Japan schedules.
- This live broadcast is Vacance Special.

Cast	Broadcast title	Broadcast topic	Guest(s)	Highest number of viewers recorded
Lee Eun-gyeol	4 Dimension Industry & Homecance Illusion (4차산업 & 홈캉스 일루션)	Magic	—N/a	3,860
Kim Gu-ra	Gu Live (구라이브)	Swimming Pool Safety	Jang Young-ran; Ji Sang-ryeol; Kim Ha-young (Actress)	1,040
Jeong Hyeong-don; Jang Sung-kyu	Bring Anything and Come At Me! PvP King of the King (무엇이든 덤벼보세요! '현피 끝판왕')	Battle	Ha Seung-jin	2,540
Park Soo-joo; Irene Kim; Lee Hyun-yi (Note: Model)	Pyeongchang-dong Runway (평창동 런웨이)	Fashion; Style	—N/a	1,126

Episode 24 & 25 (MLT-212)
- Live broadcast: August 24, 2019
- TV broadcast: September 6 & 20, 2019
- Song Ha-young (fromis 9) stood in for Ahn Yu-jin due to the latter attending IZ*ONE's Japan schedules.
- No broadcast on September 13, 2019 due to Chuseok

Cast	Broadcast title	Broadcast topic	Guest(s)	Highest number of viewers recorded
Solar (Mamamoo)	Pole Sports Yard On Chuseok (추석맞이 폴 스포츠 한마당)	Pole dance	Kim Soo-bin (Pole dancer); Kim Soo-ji (Pole dancer)	7,058
Kim Gu-ra	TV show Genuine Article Bubble (TV쇼 진품거품)	Famous Work Appraisal	Jang Young-ran; Ha Seung-jin; Lee Sook (Actress); Kim Young-bok (Ancient books expert); Jung Young-min (Ancient art pieces expert)	1,379
Jeong Hyeong-don; Jang Sung-kyu	Bring Anything and Come At Me TV: Walk Around The World (세계로 가는 무덤 TV)	Battle	Yeonhee (Rocket Punch); Ha Seung-jin	6,732
Choi Yang-rak (Note: Comedian)	The Most Fun Yang-rak Show (최유잼 양樂쇼)	Comedy; Alkkagi	Jung Sung-ho (Comedian); Kim Hak-rae (Comedian); Ha Seung-jin; Kwon Hae-bom (Guinea Pig PD); Paeng Hyun-sook (Comedienne, wife of Choi Yang-rak)	1,536

Episode 26 & 27 (MLT-213)
- Live broadcast: September 21, 2019
- TV broadcast: September 27 & October 4, 2019

Cast	Broadcast title	Broadcast topic	Guest(s)	Highest number of viewers recorded
Kim Sohyi	Dandi~ Kitchen	Cooking	Kwon Hae-bom (Guinea Pig PD)	4,219
Kim Gu-ra	TV show Genuine Article Bubble 2 (TV쇼 진품거품 2)	Famous Work Appraisal	Jang Young-ran; Yoon Jung-soo; Kim Young-bok (Ancient books expert); Jung Young-min (Ancient art pieces expert)	1,553
Jeong Hyeong-don; Jang Sung-kyu	Bring Anything and Come At Me TV: O.I.V Special (무덤 TV 전참시 특집)	Battle	IZ*ONE (Kang Hye-won, Choi Ye-na); Song Tae-hyuk (Manager of IZ*ONE); Lee Tae-yong (Manager of K.Will); Kim Yong-woon (Manager of Jang Sung-kyu); Kim Soo-min (Manager of Song Ga-in); Ji Seung-hyun (Manager of Ji Sang-ryeol)	14,565
Kim Jang-hoon	Irrational Tel (무리텔)	Song	Yoon Jung-soo; Kim Jeong-hyun (MBC announcer)	2,571

Episode 28 & 29 (MLT-214)
- Live broadcast: October 5, 2019
- TV broadcast: October 11 & 21, 2019 (Note: Starting from episode 29, the show will air on MBC on Mondays at 21:50 (KST).)
- Song Ha-young (fromis 9) stood in for Ahn Yu-jin due to the latter attending IZ*ONE's Japan schedules.
- This live broadcast is an Autumn Special; all 4 channels will do their live streams from outdoors.
- Kim Sohyi did her live stream from her restaurant, Kim Kocht, located in Vienna, Austria; her live stream began at 19:00 (KST) while the other 3 live streams began at 15:00 (KST).

Cast	Broadcast title	Broadcast topic	Guest(s)	Highest number of viewers recorded
Kim Sohyi	Dandi~ Kitchen	Cooking	Song Ha-young (fromis 9); Kwon Hae-bom (Guinea Pig PD)	3,402
Kim Gu-ra	Gu Live (Gu-ra's Side Dishes) (구라이브 (구라네 반찬))	Cooking	Jang Young-ran; Ha Seung-jin; Tzuyang (YouTuber); Yoo Jeong-im (Kimchi specialist)	2,607
Ddotty	Creator Consulting (크리에이터 컨설팅)	Creator	Jeong Jong-cheol (Comedian); Lee Ji-hye	2,982
Kim Jang-hoon	Voi-seup Korea (보이숲 코리아)	Song	EXY (Cosmic Girls); BIGMIN (YouTuber); DDaHyoNi (Twitch streamer)	6,779

Episode 30 & 31 (MLT-215)
- Live broadcast: October 19, 2019
- TV broadcast: October 28 & November 4, 2019
- Kim Jang-hoon did his live stream outdoors at Gangneung; his live stream began at 14:00 (KST) while the other 3 live streams began at 19:00 (KST).

Cast	Broadcast title	Broadcast topic	Guest(s)	Highest number of viewers recorded
Noh Sa-yeon	NohNoh Show (노노쇼)	Love & Marriage Discourse	Ji Sang-ryeol; Noh Sa-bong (Noh Sa-yeon's elder sister); Kang Jae-jun (Comedian); Lee Eun-hyung (Comedian)	1,266
Kim Gu-ra	Gu Live (Mala Tel) (구라이브 (마라텔))	Cooking	Jang Young-ran; Choi Hyung-jin (Chef); Tzuyang (YouTuber)	6,188
Ddotty	Creator Consulting (크리에이터 컨설팅)	Creator	Pengsoo (Lead of EBS 1TV's Giant PengTV)	12,012
Kim Jang-hoon	Seup-py Tour (숲내투어)	Travel	Choi Sung-min (Comedian); Eva Popiel (Broadcast personality, actress); Kwon Do-woo (FD)	4,024

Episode 32 & 33 (MLT-216)
- Live broadcast: November 1 & 2, 2019
- TV broadcast: November 11 & 18, 2019
- Kim Jang-hoon's live stream began at 13:00 (KST) on November 1 while the other 3 live streams began at 19:00 (KST) on November 2.
- IZ*ONE will be edited out from the MBC broadcast due to the Mnet vote manipulation investigation. Hence, Kim Sohyi would also not be seen in the MBC broadcast.

Cast	Broadcast title	Broadcast topic	Guest(s)	Highest number of viewers recorded
Kim Sohyi	Dandi~ Kitchen	Cooking; Home Party	IZ*ONE; Kwon Hae-bom (Guinea Pig PD)	16,559
Kim Gu-ra	Gu Live (Chi-chelin Guide) (구라이브 (치슐랭 가이드))	Fried Chicken; Eating Broadcast	Jang Young-ran; Yoo Min-sang (Comedian); Tzuyang (YouTuber)	2,983
Noh Sa-yeon	Experience, 2019 Trend! (체험, 2019 트렌드!)	Makeup	Ji Sang-ryeol; Noh Sa-bong (Noh Sa-yeon's elder sister); Kim Woo-ri (Stylist); Riri Young (Beauty creator)	881
Kim Jang-hoon	Seup of Masked Singer (복면가숲)	Song	EXY (Cosmic Girls); Ha Seung-jin; Choi Sung-min (Comedian); Lee Yoon-seok (Comedian); Jo Young-gu (Television personality); Choi Ji-yeon (Actress); Gilgu (GB9)	1,801

Episode 34 & 35 (MLT-217)
- Live broadcast: November 14 & 16, 2019
- TV broadcast: November 25 & December 2, 2019
- Ahn Yu-jin (IZ*ONE) will not appear on future broadcasts starting from this one due to the Mnet vote manipulation investigation.
- This live broadcast is a CSAT Special.
- Kim Jang-hoon's live stream began at 16:00 (KST) on November 14 (the day of CSAT) while the other 3 live streams began at 18:00 (KST) on November 16.

Cast	Broadcast title	Broadcast topic	Guest(s)	Highest number of viewers recorded
Don Spike	Meat Party (육즙 파티)	Steak; Cooking	Park Bo-ram; Kwon Do-woo (FD); Ji Byung-soo; Han Tae-woong (16-year-old farmer)	2,521
Kim Gu-ra	Gu Live (구라이브)	Mandu; Eating Broadcast	Jang Young-ran; Hong Yoon-hwa (Comedian); Tzuyang (YouTuber); Jung Ji-sun (Chef)	3,735
Ddotty	Get It Ddotty (겟잇도티)	Makeup	Oh Na-mi (Comedian); Riri Young (Beauty creator)	592
Kim Jang-hoon	Seup Quiz On The Block (숲 퀴즈 온 더 블럭)	Quiz	Choi Sung-min (Comedian); Lee Jin-sol (April)	592

Episode 36 & 37 (MLT-218)
- Live broadcast: November 30, 2019
- TV broadcast: December 9 & 16, 2019
- Kim Gu-ra and Kim Jang-hoon's live stream began at 13:00 (KST) while the other 2 live streams began at 18:00 (KST).
- 3 live broadcasts, instead of the usual 4, will be streamed beginning this series.

Cast	Broadcast title	Broadcast topic	Guest(s)	Highest number of viewers recorded
Kim Yeon-ja (Note: Singer)	Merry Amor Fati (메리 아모르파티)	Song	Boom; Cho Jun-ho; Yoyomi (Singer)	490
Kim Gu-ra; Kim Jang-hoon	Gu Live (구라이브)	Eating Broadcast	Jang Young-ran; Tzuyang (YouTuber); Moon Jung-hoon (Professor from Seoul National University College of Agriculture and Life Sciences); Lee Nam-soo (Specialist in flower crab bibimbap); Oh Jeong-dan (Stingray specialist); Kim Hye-sook (Namdo food specialist)	735
Jun Kwang-ryul	Solitary Kwang-ryul's Room (고독한 광렬방)	Reality Show	Ddotty; Hwang Je-sung (Comedian)	1,754

Episode 38 & 39 (MLT-219)
- Live broadcast: December 14, 2019
- TV broadcast: December 23, 2019 & January 6, 2020
- There is no MBC broadcast on December 30, 2019 due to the live broadcast of the 2019 MBC Drama Awards.

Cast	Broadcast title	Broadcast topic	Guest(s)	Highest number of viewers recorded
Kim Jang-hoon	Seup of Masked Singer V2 (복면가숲 V2)	Song	EXY (Cosmic Girls); Choi Sung-min (Comedian); Shin Bong-sun; Kim Hyun-chul (Singer); Jang Sung-kyu (Freelancer, former announcer); Choi Byung-seo (Comedian)	1,251
Kim Gu-ra	Gu Live (Year End Pork Party) (구라이브 (연말 돈육파티))	Pork Meat; Eating Broadcast	Jang Young-ran; Sleepy; Moon Jung-hoon (Professor from Seoul National University College of Agriculture and Life Sciences)	901
Jun Kwang-ryul	Solitary Kwang-ryul's Room (고독한 광렬방)	Photographs	Ddotty; Hwang Je-sung (Comedian)	1,561

=== 2020 ===
Episode 40 & 41 (MLT-220)
- Live broadcast: January 4, 2020
- TV broadcast: January 13 & 20, 2020
- Final live stream session and episodes of the season
- Kim Gu-ra's live stream began at 14:00 (KST) while the other 2 live streams began at 18:00 (KST).

Cast	Broadcast title	Broadcast topic	Guest(s)	Highest number of viewers recorded
Kim Jang-hoon	Curling One Touch (컬링 완타치)	Curling	Heo Il-hoo (MBC announcer); EXY (Cosmic Girls); Shorry (Mighty Mouth); Kim Eun-jung, Kim Kyung-ae, Kim Sun-young, Kim Young-mi, Kim Cho-hee ("Team Kim" female curling players)	1,350
Kim Gu-ra	Gu Live (Parting Taxi) (구라이브 (이별 택시))	Taxi; Talk	Jang Young-ran; All Lies Band (Singer-songwriter); Ha Seung-jin; Kim Hwa-young (Ha Seung-jin's wife); Kim Young-man (Arts entrepreneur, university professor); Tzuyang (YouTuber)	1,157
Jun Kwang-ryul	Kwang Pocha (광포차)	Midnight Dining	Ddotty; Heo Kyung-hwan; Im Hyun-sik; Oh Jae-moo	1,563

== Ratings ==
In the ratings below, the highest rating for the show will be in red and the lowest rating for the show will be in blue.

=== 2019 ===
List of ratings for 2019 (Episodes 1-38)

Episode #		Broadcast date	AGB ratings	
Episode #		Broadcast date	Part 1	Part 2
MLT-201	1	March 29	2.6%	3.7%
MLT-201	2	April 5	2.2%	2.9%
MLT-202	3	April 12	2.5%	3.3%
MLT-202	4	April 19	2.5%	2.6%
MLT-203	5	April 26	3.0%	4.1%
MLT-203	6	May 3	3.1%	3.2%
MLT-204	7	May 10	2.6%	3.7%
MLT-204	8	May 17	3.2%	4.5%
MLT-205	9	May 24	3.1%	4.7%
MLT-205	10	May 31	3.3%	4.1%
MLT-205	11	June 7	3.5%	3.8%
MLT-206	12	June 14	2.4%	4.6%
MLT-206	13	June 21	3.0%	4.3%
MLT-207	14	June 28	2.5%	4.2%
MLT-207	15	July 5	2.7%	4.1%
MLT-208	16	July 12	2.0%	3.7%
MLT-208	17	July 19	2.0%	2.8%
MLT-209	18	July 26	2.0%	3.7%
MLT-209	19	August 2	2.3%	3.4%
MLT-210	20	August 9	2.2%	3.7%
MLT-210	21	August 16	2.5%	3.4%
MLT-211	22	August 23	2.2%	3.4%
MLT-211	23	August 30	2.2%	3.0%
MLT-212	24	September 6	2.3%	2.6%
MLT-212	25	September 20	2.7%	3.7%
MLT-213	26	September 27	2.2%	3.6%
MLT-213	27	October 4	2.7%	4.0%
MLT-214	28	October 11	2.3%	3.8%
MLT-214	29	October 21	2.7%	2.1%
MLT-215	30	October 28	2.3%	2.3%
MLT-215	31	November 4	2.4%	2.4%
MLT-216	32	November 11	2.9%	3.2%
MLT-216	33	November 18	2.9%	2.5%
MLT-217	34	November 25	3.3%	3.1%
MLT-217	35	December 2	3.5%	2.5%
MLT-218	36	December 9	2.7%	2.8%
MLT-218	37	December 16	2.0%	2.2%
MLT-219	38	December 23	1.9%	2.4%

=== 2020 ===
List of ratings for 2020 (Episodes 39-41)

Episode #		Broadcast date	AGB ratings	
Episode #		Broadcast date	Part 1	Part 2
MLT-219	39	January 6	1.4%	1.8%
MLT-220	40	January 13	2.0%	2.2%
MLT-220	41	January 20	1.4%	2.6%

== Awards and nominations ==
Year	Award	Category	Recipients	Result	Ref
2019	19th MBC Entertainment Awards	Top Excellence Award in Variety Category (Female)	Kim Soo-mi	Nominated	
2019	19th MBC Entertainment Awards	Rookie Award in Variety Category (Male)	Jang Sung-kyu	Won	
2019	19th MBC Entertainment Awards	Rookie Award in Variety Category (Female)	Kim Sohyi	Nominated	
2019	19th MBC Entertainment Awards	Multi-tainer Award	Pengsoo	Nominated	
