= Yoo In-na =

South Korean actress (born 1982)

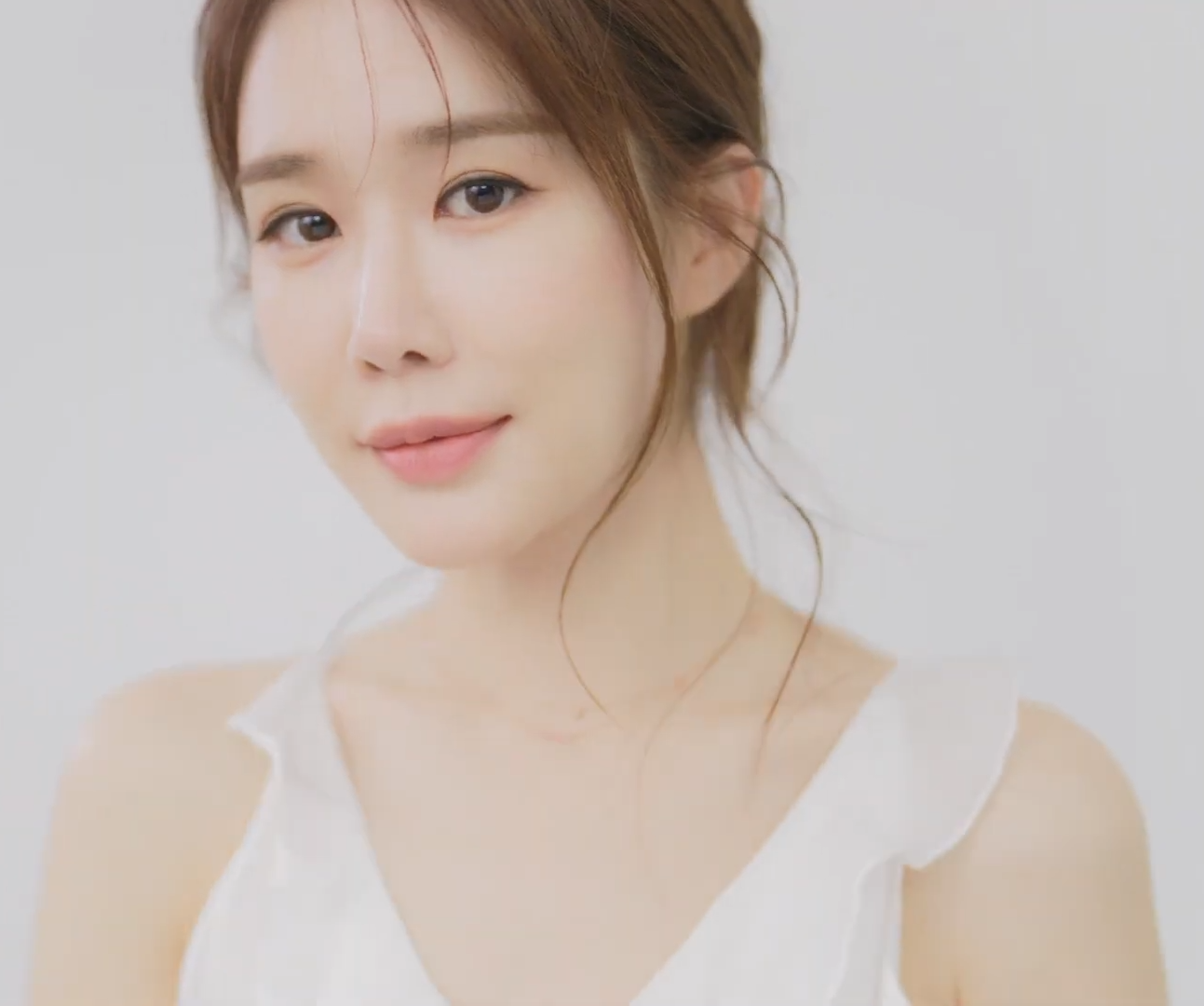
- Yoo in 2023
- Born: June 5, 1982 (age 44); Seongnam, South Korea
- Occupation: Actress
- Years active: 2006–present
- Agent: Chorokbaem Entertainment

Korean name
- Hangul: 유인나
- RR: Yu Inna
- MR: Yu Inna
- Website: chorokbaement.com

Yoo In-na (Korean: 유인나; born June 5, 1982) is a South Korean actress. After supporting roles in High Kick! Through the Roof (2009–10) and Secret Garden (2010), she rose to fame as the lead actress in the Queen and I (2012) and My Secret Hotel (2014). She then had starring roles in My Love from the Star (2013–14) and Guardian: The Lonely and Great God (2016–17) the latter of which was one of the highest rated cable television series in South Korea. She has since starred in the television series Touch Your Heart (2019), The Spies Who Loved Me (2020), and True to Love (2023).

Aside from acting, Yoo also ventured into radio. She was the DJ of Let's Crank Up the Volume from 2011 to 2016. In 2024 she announced her return as a Radio DJ, with the formation of her radio show on YouTube titled, Yoo In Radio.

== Career ==
At the age of 16, Yoo In-na joined an entertainment agency as an apprentice singer in 1998, and had nearly become part of a girl group. After 11 years and five different agencies, she could not be prominent. Yoo said she had difficulty memorizing the dance choreography required of K-pop singers, and after practicing for eight hours a day, six days a week, she had resigned from becoming an idol.

In 2006, Yoo joined YG Entertainment as an aspiring actress. She said, "If singing wasn't meant to be, I decided to give acting a go because it seemed fun. I never gave up. A lot of my friends did, though, even though they were prettier and more capable than me." She first came to note in 2009 with the sitcom High Kick Through the Roof on MBC. Several supporting roles followed, notably in the 2010 drama Secret Garden, which she received a Best New Actress award at the Baeksang Arts Awards, and as the second female lead in Hong sisters' romantic comedy The Greatest Love. To maintain public visibility, Yoo Inna joined the cast of the variety show Heroes, which aired from July 18, 2010, to May 1, 2011.

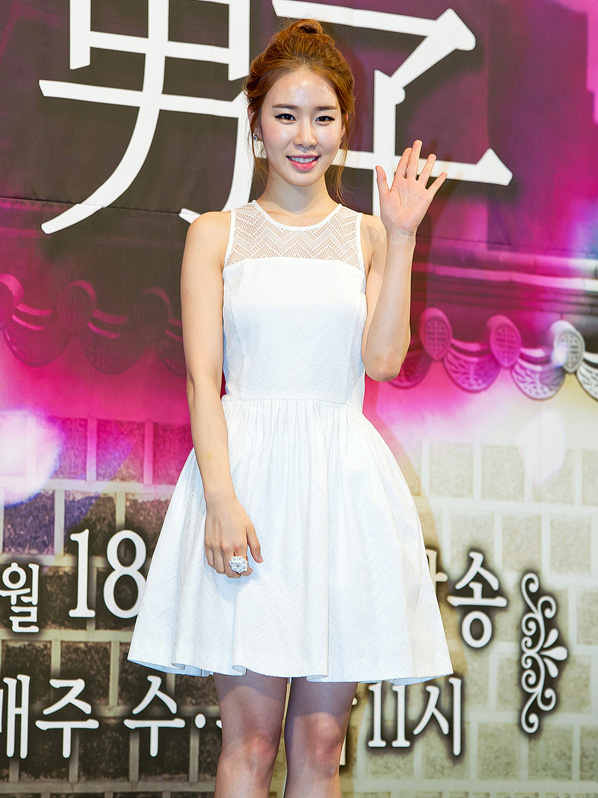
Yoo at the Queen and I press conference in 2012

She was an MC for TV Entertainment Tonight from March 3, 2011, to June 4, 2012, for which she won Best Variety Entertainer at the SBS Entertainment Awards. She was also the DJ for KBS Cool FM's Let's Crank Up the Volume, which became the highest-rated radio program in its timeslot across both AM and FM bandwidths under Yoo's tenure.Yoo in-a is considered one of the greatest radio DJ ever produced by KBS. Yoo In-na was a popular host known by many nicknames from listeners, such as 'Yudi' (Yoo In-na + DJ) and 'Kkuldi' (Honey Voice + DJ). She was regarded by young listeners as the 'number one preferred DJ'.

Yoo's vocals were featured in Humming Urban Stereo's 2011 digital single "You, That Day" (넌 그날). She also sang for the soundtrack of her 2011 film My Black Mini Dress alongside her castmates Yoon Eun-hye, Park Han-byul, and Cha Ye-ryun.

In 2012, Yoo starred in her first leading role in the tvN time-slip romance series Queen and I, and in and in 2013, she appeared in the KBS drama You Are the Best! and the SBS drama My Love from the Star, all of which recorded viewership ratings of over 30% and were greatly loved by viewers. In 2016-2017 she appeared in the tvN drama Guardian: The Lonely and Great God playing the second female lead. The drama was a commercial success with the final episode recording an 18.68% nationwide audience share, making it the seventh highest-rated drama in Korean cable television history, and she was nominated "Best Supporting Actress" at the 10th Korea Drama Awards.

In 2024 Yoo Inna opened her own radio YouTube show titled Yoo-In Radio with the first guest, Ko Young-bae from Korean band Soran.

In July 2025, following YG Entertainment’s announcement that it would discontinue its actor management division, Yoo signed her first exclusive contract in 19 years with a new agency, Chorokbaem Entertainment.

== Personal life ==
Yoo Inna is best friends with fellow singer-actress and You Are the Best! co-star IU, whom she has known since they met on the television show Heroes in 2010. IU has written three songs about Yoo or inspired by her: "You", "Drama", and "Dear My Crazy Soulmate".

At a June 7, 2012 fan meeting to mark the end of Queen and I, Ji Hyun-woo made a surprise public declaration that he was in love with his co-star Yoo. The declaration was covered significantly by the press in the following days, during which both the two actors and their agencies remained quiet on the issue, except for a message to his fans that Ji posted on Twitter on June 11. Speculation about their relationship status ended on June 17, when they were photographed on a midnight date at a park in Bundang, Gyeonggi, where Yoo lives. On June 18, Yoo confirmed on her radio show that they were dating. On May 14, 2014, their respective agencies confirmed in a press release that the couple had ended their relationship.

== Philanthropy ==
On January 2019 Yoo secretly donated 30 million won to Salvation Army's meal support project for undernourished children.

On February 9, 2023, Yoo donated 30 million won to help in 2023 Turkey–Syria earthquake through Hope Bridge National Disaster Relief Association.

On 22 June 2024, Yoo participated in "Can you say it again?" event organised by social welfare organization Snail of Love. Yoo is a Soul Leader, a designation for high-value donors of the social welfare organization Snail of Love. She has donated a total of 230 million won, which was used to support 25 hearing-impaired children by covering the cost of cochlear implant surgeries and devices.

== Advertisements and brand deals ==
Yoo has been a sought-after model, especially in the beauty and fashion industries. In March 2019, Yoo was selected as the most valuable female advertising model. It was also the year Yoo signed most number of advertisement deals of her career. In December 2024, Yoo became the first-ever exclusive model for Meritz Financial Group's subsidiary Meritz Security, which has not had a model in the past 23 years.

== Filmography ==
=== Film ===
Year	Title	Role	Notes	Ref.
2006	Arang	Hotel Lady	Cameo	
2010	The Fair Love	Han Seul-yi		
2011	My Black Mini Dress	Min-hee		
2012	Love Fiction	Soo-jung / Kyung-sook		
2015	Wedding bible			
2020	Mr. Zoo: The Missing VIP	Ming-Ming	Voice	
2021	New Year Blues	Lee Hyo-young		

=== Television series ===
Year	Title	Role	Notes	Ref.
2009–2010	High Kick Through the Roof	Yoo In-na		
2010	Secret Garden	Min Ah-young		
2011	The Greatest Love	Kang Se-ri		
2011	Birdie Buddy	Lee Gong-sook		
2012	Queen and I	Choi Hee-jin		
2013	You Are the Best!	Lee Yoo-shin		
2013	Potato Star 2013QR3	Jogging woman	Cameo (Episode 4)	
2013–2014	My Love from the Star	Yoo Se-mi		
2014	My Secret Hotel	Nam Sang-hyo		
2015	Bubble Gum	Radio Voice		
2016	One More Happy Ending	Go Dong-mi		
2016–2017	Guardian: The Lonely and Great God	Kim Sun / Sunny		
2018	Top Star U-back	Radio DJ	Cameo (Episode 5)	
2019	Touch Your Heart	Oh Yoon-seo / Oh Jin-shim		
2020	The Spies Who Loved Me	Kang Ah-reum		
2021–2022	Snowdrop	Kang Chung-ya		
2023	True to Love	Yeon Bo-ra / Deborah		
2026	Boyfriend on Demand	Dating Manager		

=== Web series ===
Year	Title	Role	Notes	Ref.
2015	We Broke Up	Radio DJ for "Volume Up Stars"	Cameo (Episode 8)	
2015	The Secret Message	Amy		
2018	YG Future Strategy Office	Yoo In-na	Cameo (Episode 8)	

=== Television shows ===
Year	Title	Role	Notes	Ref.
2007	Raising a Pet Man: I'm a Pet	Guest	Season 1 Cheongmi's friend	
2010–2011	Heroes	Cast member		
2011–2012	TV Entertainment Tonight	MC	March 3, 2011 – May 30, 2012	
2013	Little Big Hero	Narrator	Documentary	
2013	WIN: Who is Next?	MC		
2014	Get It Beauty	MC		
2014	Mix & Match	MC		
2015	Fashion King Korea	MC	Season 3	
2016	Candy In My Ear	Guest		
2018	Cafe Amor	Cast member		
2019	Funding Together	Cast member	with You Hee-yeol & Noh Hong-chul	
2020	Love of 7.7 Billion	Host	with Shin Dong-yup & Kim Hee-chul	
2021	Phone Cleansing	Cast member	with DinDin and Yoon Jong-shin	
2021	JTBC Factual	Narrator		
2021	Still a Brilliant Day	Narrator	Documentary 3 Days Playlist	
2021	Changwon K-POP World Festival	MC		
2021	Together Rewind	Narrator	Special Project (tvN 15th Anniversary)	
2021	Sinabro Dream Operator	Cast member	with Lee Yong-jin and Kang Seung-yoon	
2021–2022	Better Life, Together	Narrator	KBS Campaign	
2021–2022	The Museum Is Alive	Narrator	KBS documentary History Special Time	
2022	Between Us	Host	with Lee Yong-jin and Aiki	
2022	Chain Reaction	Host	with Zico, Lee Jin-ho, and Yujeong Brave Girls	
2022	Ava Dream	Host	with Lee Yong-jin, Yoo Se-yoon, Yang Se-hyung, Lee Jin-ho, and Kim Hyun-chul	
2024-ongoing	Detectives' Trade Secrets	Panelist	with Defconn and Kim Poong	
2024	Possessed Love	Panelist	with Shin Dong-yup, Yoo Seon-ho and Gabee	
2025	Possessed Love 2	Panelist	with Shin Dong-yup, Yoo Seon-ho and Gabee	
2025	Let's Meet Now	Host		
2025-2026	Switch My Home	Panelist	with Sean (Jinusean), Yoon Doo-joon and Lee Eun-ji	
2026	Hidden Age	MC		
2026	Goblin 10th Anniversary Trip	Cast	with Gong Yoo, Lee Dong-wook and Kim Go-eun	

=== Web shows ===
Year	Title	Role	Notes	Ref.
2021	Charging for Cha Live	MC	About Hyundai and Dingo Music	
2021	Hull Watch Party	Narrator		
2025–present	Get it Beauty (Mobile Live)	MC		

=== Music video appearances ===
Year	Title	Artist	Length	Ref.
2010	"Tell Me Goodbye"	Big Bang	4:08	
2010	"In My Head"	Brian Joo	3:19	
2011	"You, That Day"	Humming Urban Stereo	3:51	

=== Radio shows ===
Year	Title	Role	Ref.
2011–2016	Yoo In-Na's Let's Crank Up the Volume	Radio DJ	
2024–present	Yoo In Radio	Radio DJ	

=== Hosting ===
Year	Title	Notes	Ref.
2022	Opening ceremony 23rd Jeonju International Film Festival	with Jang Hyun-sung	

== Discography ==
=== Singles ===
Title	Year	Album
"You, That Day" (Humming Urban Stereo feat. Yoo In-Na)	2011	That Day
"My Black Mini Dress" (with Yoon Eun-hye, Park Han-byul, Cha Ye-ryun and Yoo In-na)	2011	My Black Mini Dress OST
"Always For You" (with Jang Na-ra, Seo In-Young, Sandara Park, Yoo Da-in and Yoo In-na)	2016	One More Happy Ending OST

== Awards and nominations ==
Name of the award ceremony, year presented, category, nominee of the award, and the result of the nomination
Award ceremony	Year	Category	Nominee / Work	Result	Ref.
APAN Star Awards	2012	Rising Star Award	Queen and I	Won	
Asia Model Awards	2013	BBF Pop Star Award	Yoo In-na	Won	
Baeksang Arts Awards	2011	Best New Actress – Television	Secret Garden	Won	
DramaFever Awards	2017	Best Supporting Actress	Guardian: The Lonely and Great God	Won	
Fashionista Awards	2017	Best Fashionista – TV & Film Division	Guardian: The Lonely and Great God	Nominated	
KBS Drama Awards	2013	Best Supporting Actress	You Are the Best!	Nominated	
KBS Entertainment Awards	2014	Best Radio DJ	Let's Crank Up the Volume	Won	
Korea Drama Awards	2011	Best Supporting Actress	Secret Garden, The Greatest Love	Nominated	
Korea Drama Awards	2017	Best Supporting Actress	Guardian: The Lonely and Great God	Nominated	
Korea Drama Awards	2019	Excellence Award, Actress	Touch Your Heart	Nominated	
MBC Drama Awards	2011	Best New Actress in a Miniseries	The Greatest Love	Nominated	
MBC Drama Awards	2020	Top Excellence Award, Actress in a Wednesday-Thursday Miniseries	The Spies Who Loved Me	Nominated	
MBC Drama Awards	2020	Best Couple Award	Yoo In-na with Eric Mun; The Spies Who Loved Me	Nominated	
MBC Entertainment Awards	2019	Excellence Award in Variety (Female)	Funding Together	Nominated	
Olleh-Lotte Smartphone Film Festival	2011	Special award	Yoo In-na with Narsha; Uninvited Guest	Won	
SBS Entertainment Awards	2011	Best Entertainer in a Variety Show	TV Entertainment Tonight	Won	
SBS Entertainment Awards	2011	Netizen Popularity Award	TV Entertainment Tonight	Nominated	
Soompi Awards	2018	Best Supporting Actress	Guardian: The Lonely and Great God	Won	
Style Icon Awards	2014	Top 10 Style Icons	Yoo In-na	Nominated	
tvN10 Awards	2016	Romantic-Comedy Queen	Queen and I	Nominated	
