= Funding Together =

South Korean television show

- Promotional Poster
- Hangul: 같이 펀딩
- RR: Gachi peonding
- MR: Kach'i p'ŏnding
- Genre: Reality; Variety
- Starring: You Hee-yeol; Yoo Jun-sang; Noh Hong-chul; Yoo In-na; Jang Do-yeon
- Country of origin: South Korea
- Original language: Korean
- No. of seasons: 1
- No. of episodes: 13

Production
- Producers: Kim Tae-ho; Hyun Jeong-wan
- Production location: South Korea
- Running time: 85 minutes

Original release
- Network: MBC
- Release: August 18 – November 11, 2019

Funding Together (Korean: 같이 펀딩) is a South Korean reality show program on MBC. It airs on MBC starting from August 18, 2019 on Sundays at 18:30 (KST).

== Synopsis ==
In this show, the 4 casts, You Hee-yeol, Yoo Jun-sang, Noh Hong-chul, Yoo In-na and Jang Do-yeon will be showcasing their ideas that might be difficult to put into reality alone and through the help of the viewers, they will help to fund the project.

== List of episodes ==
Ep.#	Air Date	Funding Theme	Progress	Planner	Guest(s)	Ref.
1	August 18, 2019	March First Movement 100th Year Anniversary Flag Box	Introduction to the funding theme	Yoo Jun-sang	Seol Min-seok	
2	August 25, 2019	March First Movement 100th Year Anniversary Flag Box	Designing of the Flag Box	Yoo Jun-sang	—N/a	
2	August 25, 2019	Special Exhibition in a Small-scaled Nightclub	Introduction to the funding theme	Noh Hong-chul	Jung Hae-in	
3	September 1, 2019	Special Exhibition in a Small-scaled Nightclub	Introduction to the funding theme	Noh Hong-chul	Jung Hae-in	
3	September 1, 2019	March 1 Movement 100th Year Anniversary Flag Box	Collecting the feedback of the different consumers	Yoo Jun-sang	Jang Do-yeon; Defconn; DinDin; Alberto Mondi	
4	September 8, 2019	Lending Other's Voice to Make an Audio Book		Yoo In-na	Bae Cheol-soo; Kang Ha-neul	
5	September 15, 2019	March 1 Movement 100th Year Anniversary Flag Box		Yoo Jun-sang	Defconn; Bewhy; Gaeko (Dynamic Duo)	
6	September 22, 2019	Special Exhibition in a Small-scaled Nightclub		Noh Hong-chul	Choiza (Dynamic Duo)	
7	September 29, 2019	Lending Other's Voice to Make an Audio Book		Yoo In-na	Kang Ha-neul; IU (Voice appearance)	
8	October 6, 2019	March 1 Movement 100th Year Anniversary Flag Box		Yoo Jun-sang	Defconn; Gaeko (Dynamic Duo)	
9	October 6, 2019	Apple Together	Went to interview the affected victims of the typhoon.	Jang Do-yeon	IU (Voice appearance)	
9	October 13, 2019	Apple Together	Using apples to make different dishes	Jang Do-yeon	—N/a	
10	October 20, 2019	Recycle Bag	Visited the artist	You Hee-yeol	—N/a	
11	October 27, 2019	March 1 Movement 100th Year Anniversary Flag Box		Yoo Jun-sang	Defconn	
12	November 3, 2019	March 1 Movement 100th Year Anniversary Flag Box		Yoo Jun-sang	Defconn	
13	November 17, 2019					

== Ratings ==
- Ratings listed below are the individual corner ratings of Funding Together. (Note: Individual corner ratings do not include commercial time, which regular ratings include.)
- In the ratings below, the highest rating for the show will be in red and the lowest rating for the show will be in blue each year.

Ep.	Broadcast date	AGB Nielsen (Nationwide)	
Ep.	Broadcast date	Part 1	Part 2
1	August 18, 2019	3.2%	3.4%
2	August 25, 2019	3.3%	3.6%
3	September 1, 2019	2.9%	2.8%
4	September 8, 2019	3.0%	2.8%
5	September 15, 2019	3.5%	2.6%
6	September 22, 2019	3.5%	2.9%
7	September 29, 2019	2.8%	3.4%
8	October 6, 2019	3.3%	3.4%
9	October 13, 2019	4.2%	4.6%
10	October 20, 2019	3.6%	3.1%
11	October 27, 2019	3.0%	3.4%
12	November 3, 2019	3.6%	3.5%
13	November 17, 2019	3.8%	3.1%

== Awards and nominations ==
Year	Award	Category	Recipients	Result	Ref
2019	19th MBC Entertainment Awards	Top Excellence Award in Music/ Talk(Male)	Noh Hong-chul	Won	
2019	19th MBC Entertainment Awards	Top Excellence Award in Music/ Talk(Male)	You Hee-yeol	Nominated	
2019	19th MBC Entertainment Awards	Top Excellence Award in Variety (Female)	Jang Do-yeon	Nominated	
2019	19th MBC Entertainment Awards	Excellence Award in Variety (Female)	Yoo In-na	Nominated	
2019	19th MBC Entertainment Awards	Best Entertainer Award	Jang Do-yeon	Won	
2019	19th MBC Entertainment Awards	Multi-tainer Award	Yoo Jun-sang	Won	
