= 2019 MBC Entertainment Awards =

19th edition of award ceremony

- Date: December 29, 2019
- Site: MBC Public Hall, Sangam-dong, Mapo-gu, Seoul
- Hosted by: Jun Hyun-moo; Hwasa; P.O

Television coverage
- Network: MBC
- Duration: Approx. 240 minutes
- Ratings: 11.0% (Part 1); 14.7% (Part 2)

The 2019 MBC Entertainment Awards presented by Munhwa Broadcasting Corporation (MBC), took place on December 29, 2019 at MBC Public Hall in Sangam-dong, Mapo-gu, Seoul. It was hosted by Jun Hyun-moo, Hwasa and P.O.

== Nominations and winners ==
(Winners denoted in bold)

Grand Prize (Daesang)	Program of the Year	Entertainer of the Year
**Park Na-rae**; Lee Young-ja; Yoo Jae-suk; Kim Gu-ra; Jun Hyun-moo; Kim Sung-joo	**I Live Alone**; Where Is My Home; Hangout with Yoo; Radio Star; King of Mask Singer; Those Who Cross the Line; Omniscient Interfering View; Broadcasting on Your Side	**Lee Young-ja**; **Yoo Jae-suk**; **Park Na-rae**; **Kim Gu-ra**; **Jun Hyun-moo**; **Kim Sung-joo**
Top Excellence Award
Variety Category	Music/Talk Category	Radio Category
Male	Male	**Yang Hee-eun – Women Era**
**Yang Se-hyung – Where Is My Home, Omniscient Interfering View**; Lee Si-eon – I Live Alone; Kian84 – I Live Alone	**Noh Hong-chul – Where Is My Home, Funding Together**; Lee Sang-min – Section TV; Kim Gook-jin – Radio Star; You Hee-yeol – Funding Together, Hangout with Yoo; Lee Juck – Hangout with Yoo	**Yang Hee-eun – Women Era**
Female	Female	**Yang Hee-eun – Women Era**
**Song Eun-i – Omniscient Interfering View**; Jang Do-yeon – Funding Together, Love Me Actually; Kim Soo-mi – My Little Television V2	**Kim Sook – Where Is My Home**; Eugene – What is Study?; Shin Bong-sun – King of Mask Singer, Omniscient Interfering View; Park Seul-gi – Section TV	**Yang Hee-eun – Women Era**
Excellence Award
Variety Category	Music/Talk Category	Radio Category
Male		**Sandeul – Sandeul's Star Night**; **Rooftop Moonlight – Blue Night Rooftop Moonlight**
**Yoo Byung-jae – Those Who Cross the Line, Omniscient Interfering View**; **Sung Hoon – I Live Alone**; Kim Jong-min – Those Who Cross the Line; Boom – Broadcasting on Your Side	**Jo Se-ho – Hangout with Yoo, Sister's Salon**; Heo Kyung-hwan – Love Me Actually; Kim Jeong-hyun – Section TV; Lee Yoon-seok – King of Mask Singer	**Sandeul – Sandeul's Star Night**; **Rooftop Moonlight – Blue Night Rooftop Moonlight**
Female		**Sandeul – Sandeul's Star Night**; **Rooftop Moonlight – Blue Night Rooftop Moonlight**
**Hwasa – I Live Alone**; Yoo In-young – Love Me Actually; Yoo In-na – Funding Together; Moon Geun-young – Those Who Cross the Line	**Ahn Young-mi – Radio Star**; Mina – Show! Music Core; Hong Eun-hee – Where Is My Home; Kyungri – Section TV	**Sandeul – Sandeul's Star Night**; **Rooftop Moonlight – Blue Night Rooftop Moonlight**
Rookie Award
Variety Category		Radio Category
Male	Female	**Kim Eana – Kim Eana's Night Letter**; **Jang Sung-kyu – Good Morning FM It is Jang Sung-kyu**
**Yoo San-seul – Hangout with Yoo**; **Jang Sung-kyu – My Little Television V2, Omniscient Interfering View**; **Hong Hyun-hee – Sister's Salon, Omniscient Interfering View**	**Hong Hyun-hee – Sister's Salon, Omniscient Interfering View**; Song Ga-in – Omniscient Interfering View; Risabae – Sister's Salon; Kim So-hee – My Little Television V2; Chae Ji-an – Love Me Actually	**Kim Eana – Kim Eana's Night Letter**; **Jang Sung-kyu – Good Morning FM It is Jang Sung-kyu**
Popularity Award	Best Entertainer Award	Global Trend Award
**Seo Jang-hoon – Broadcasting on Your Side**; **Ahn Jung-hwan – Broadcasting on Your Side**; **Kim Byung-hyun – Broadcasting on Your Side**	**Jang Do-yeon – Funding Together, Love Me Actually**	**King of Mask Singer**
Best Teamwork Award	Multi-tainer Award	Achievement Award
**Henry Lau, Kian84, Lee Si-eon, Sung Hoon** – **I Live Alone**	**Yoo Jun-sang** – **Funding Together**; **Han Hye-yeon** – **Sister's Salon, I Live Alone**; Pengsoo – My Little Television V2; Cha Hong – Sister's Salon; Kim Chung-jae – I Live Alone	**Kim Hyun-cheol** – **King of Mask Singer**; **Yoo Young-seok** – **King of Mask Singer**; **Yoon Sang** – **King of Mask Singer**
Best Couple Award	Special Award	Scriptwriter of the Year
**Henry Lau and Kian84 – I Live Alone**; Seo Jang-hoon and Boom – Broadcasting on Your Side; Ahn Jung-hwan and Kim Sung-joo – Broadcasting on Your Side; Kim Byung-hyun and Kim Je-dong – Broadcasting on Your Side; Kim Gu-ra and Ahn Young-mi – Radio Star; Park Hyun-woo and Jung Kyung-chun – Hangout with Yoo; Jo Se-ho and Hong Hyun-hee – Sister's Salon	Music/Talk	**Jung Da-woon** – **Where Is My Home**
**Henry Lau and Kian84 – I Live Alone**; Seo Jang-hoon and Boom – Broadcasting on Your Side; Ahn Jung-hwan and Kim Sung-joo – Broadcasting on Your Side; Kim Byung-hyun and Kim Je-dong – Broadcasting on Your Side; Kim Gu-ra and Ahn Young-mi – Radio Star; Park Hyun-woo and Jung Kyung-chun – Hangout with Yoo; Jo Se-ho and Hong Hyun-hee – Sister's Salon	**Park Hyun-woo, Jeong Kyung-cheon, Lee Geon-woo – Hangout with Yoo**	**Jung Da-woon** – **Where Is My Home**
**Henry Lau and Kian84 – I Live Alone**; Seo Jang-hoon and Boom – Broadcasting on Your Side; Ahn Jung-hwan and Kim Sung-joo – Broadcasting on Your Side; Kim Byung-hyun and Kim Je-dong – Broadcasting on Your Side; Kim Gu-ra and Ahn Young-mi – Radio Star; Park Hyun-woo and Jung Kyung-chun – Hangout with Yoo; Jo Se-ho and Hong Hyun-hee – Sister's Salon	Variety	**Jung Da-woon** – **Where Is My Home**
**Henry Lau and Kian84 – I Live Alone**; Seo Jang-hoon and Boom – Broadcasting on Your Side; Ahn Jung-hwan and Kim Sung-joo – Broadcasting on Your Side; Kim Byung-hyun and Kim Je-dong – Broadcasting on Your Side; Kim Gu-ra and Ahn Young-mi – Radio Star; Park Hyun-woo and Jung Kyung-chun – Hangout with Yoo; Jo Se-ho and Hong Hyun-hee – Sister's Salon	**Seol Min-seok –Those Who Cross the Line**	**Jung Da-woon** – **Where Is My Home**

== Presenters ==
Order	Presenter	Award	Ref.
1	Lee Do-hyun, Kang Mi-na	Rookie Award in Radio Category; Rookie Award in Variety Category	
2	Park Ji-hoon, Jo Se-ho	Best Entertainer Award; Best Teamwork Award	
3	Yang Se-hyung, Park Na-rae	Special Award in Music/Talk Category; Special Award in Variety Category	
4	Pengsoo	Global Trend Award	
5	Sung Hoon, Lee Si-eon	Multi-tainer Award	
6	Yoo Jae-suk, Im Soo-hyang	Achievement Award; Popularity Award	
7	Song Eun-i, Ddotty	Writer of the Year Award	
8	Lee Mal-nyeon, Ju Ho-min	Best Couple Award	
9	Zico, Jang Do-yeon	Excellence Award in Music/Talk Category; Excellence Award in Radio Category; Excellence Award in Variety Category	
10	Gray, Hong Hyun-hee	Program of the Year	
11	Lee Soo-hyuk, Shin Bong-sun	Top Excellence Award in Music/Talk Category; Top Excellence Award in Radio Category	
12	Kian84, Henry Lau	Top Excellence Award in Variety Category	
13	Lee Young-ja	Grand Prize (Daesang)	

== Special performances ==
Order	Artist	Song/Spectacle	Ref.
1	Hong Hyun-hee with Jun Hyun-moo	Pierrot Smiling at Us (Original: Kim Wan-sun)	
2	Norazo	Cider	
3	Hwasa (Mamamoo)	Twit	
4	Yoo Jae-suk	Hapjeong Station Exit 5	
4	Yoo Jae-suk	Redevelopment of Love	
