= Hong Hyun Hee =

South Korean comedian

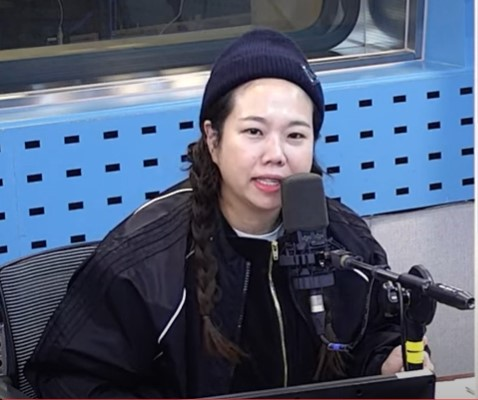
- Hong Hyun Hee in SBS Radio
- Born: May 10, 1982 (age 44); Seoul, South Korea
- Spouse: Jason (Yeon Je Seung) (m. 2018)
- Children: Yeon Jun Beom

Comedy career
- Years active: 2007 - present

- Korean Name
- Hangul: 홍현희
- Hanja: 洪賢姬
- RR: Hong Hyeonhui
- MR: Hong Hyŏnhŭi

Hong Hyun Hee (Korean: 홍현희; born May 10, 1982) is a South Korean comedian and entertainer.

== Personal life ==
On October 21, 2019, Hong Hyun Hee and celebrity interior designer Jason held a private wedding at the Grand Hyatt Seoul, with only their close friends and family in attendance. The couple met through Kim Young Hee, who introduced them after meeting Jason on the JTBC reality show “Old House, New House.”

Hong Hyun Hee gave birth to a son on August 5, 2022, after 4 years of marriage.

== Career ==
Hong Hyun Hee began her entertainment career as a comedian in 2007, as a comedienne from the 9th SBS public recruitment. After debuting in 2007 she has since appeared on many entertainment and variety shows.

== Filmography ==
=== Television show ===
Year	Title	Notes	Channel
	People Looking For Laughter	<President's Policy> <Bad girl> <I love you Correa>	SBS
	Gag Tonight		SBS
	Strong Heart	Guest	SBS
	Comedy Big League	<Calabar> <The King of Comedy>	TvN
2017	Super Family		SBS
2018	Taste of Wife		TV Chosun
2019	I Live Alone		MBC
2019	Where is My Home		MBC
2019	Eye Contact		Channel A
2019	Sister's Salon (Unnies Salon)		MBC
2019	Happy Together	Guest	KBS TV
2019–present	Omniscient Interfering View	Cast	MBC
2020	Live Happy Dream Lotto 6/45	Episode 894	MBC
2020	Running Man	Guest appearance on April 5, 2020	SBS
2020	PPONG School	Guest appearance	TV Chosun
2020 - 2021	Long Live and Work		MBN
2021	Radio Star	Episode 748	MBC
2023	Dancing Queens on the Road	Manager/Host	tvN

== Awards and nominations ==
Year	Award	Category	Nominated work	Result	Ref
2019	19th MBC Entertainment Awards	Rookie Award, Variety Category (Female)	Omniscient Interfering View	Won	
2021	57th Baeksang Arts Awards	Best Variety Performer – Female	Omniscient Interfering View	Nominated	
2021	2021 KBS Entertainment Awards	Best Entertainer Award (Show/Variety Category)	LAN Marketplace	Won	
2021	21st MBC Entertainment Awards	Excellence Award, Variety Category (Female)	Omniscient Interfering View	Won	
2021	21st MBC Entertainment Awards	Best Couple Award, (with Im Jeong-su)	Omniscient Interfering View	Nominated	
2022	22nd MBC Entertainment Awards	Top Excellence Award, Variety Category (Female)	Omniscient Interfering View	Nominated	
2022	22nd MBC Entertainment Awards	Multiplayer Award	Omniscient Interfering View	Won	

=== State honors ===
Name of country, year given, and name of honor
Country	Organization	Year	Honor or Award	Ref.
South Korea (Note: Honors are given at the Korean Popular Culture and Arts Awards, arranged by the Korea Creative Content Agency and hosted by the Ministry of Culture, Sports and Tourism. They are awarded to those who have contributed to the arts and South Korea's pop culture.)	Korean Popular Culture and Arts Awards	2022	Minister of Culture, Sports and Tourism Commendation	
