= Jang Do-yeon =

South Korean comedian (born 1985)

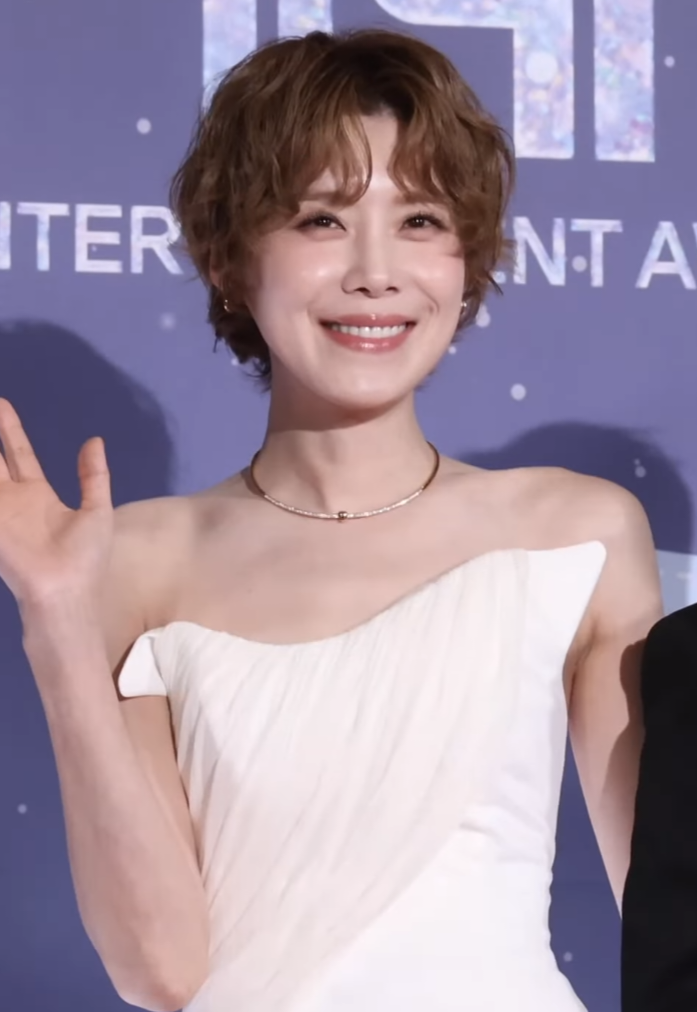
- Jang in December 2025
- Born: March 10, 1985 (age 41); Yeonggwang County, South Jeolla Province, South Korea

Comedy career
- Years active: 2006–present
- Medium: Stand-up, Television
- Genres: Observational, Sketch, Wit, Parody, Slapstick, Dramatic, Sitcom

Korean name
- Hangul: 장도연
- RR: Jang Doyeon
- MR: Chang Toyŏn

Jang Do-yeon (Korean: 장도연; born March 10, 1985) is a South Korean comedian.

== Education ==
Jang was a student at Kyung Hee University's College of Art and Design, although, due to commitments in television broadcasts, she has yet to graduate from her course.

== Career ==
In 2007, Jang made her debut in the South Korean entertainment industry when she appeared on Mnet's talk show, Shin Dong-yeop's Talk King 18. In the following year, she became a cast member of Gag Concert, after joining the 22nd class of KBS comedians.

In 2017 she was a cast member in MBC's variety show We Got Married, paired with actor Choi Min-yong.

Since April 2025, she signed contract with SM Culture & Contents (SM C&C).

== Filmography ==
=== Television series ===
Year	Title	Role	Notes	Ref.
2014	Plus Nine Boys		Special appearance/cameo	
2014	Modern Farmer		Special appearance/cameo	
2015	Misaengmul	Ahn Young-i	Main character	
2015	The Family is Coming	Jang Do-yeon	Various characters	
2016	Drinking Solo	Seo Do-yeon (Korean professor)	Episode 12	
2016	Sweet Stranger and Me	Jung Hyun's fiancée (passenger)	Episodes 1, 8	
2016	Ugly Miss Young-ae 15		Episode 14	
2017	Radiant Office	Customer	Episode 2 special appearance/cameo	
2017–2018	Smashing on Your Back	Jang Do-yeon		

=== Television shows ===
Year	Title	Role	Notes	Ref.
2006–2012	Gag Concert	Cast member		
2012–2021	Comedy Big League	Cast member		
2015	My Little Television	Cast member with Park Na-rae	Episodes 27–28	
2015	Two Yoo Project Sugar Man	Team member of Team Yoo Hee-yeol	Pilot	
2015	I Can See Your Voice - Season 2	Tone-deaf Detective Team	Episodes 1–2, 6, 8, 10	
2016	Stargram	Cast member	Season 1	
2016–2017	New Yang Nam Show	Host	Season 1–2	
2016–2018	I Can See Your Voice	Tone-deaf Detective Team (fixed)	Season 3–5	
2017	King of Mask Singer	Contestant (Pippi Longstocking)	Episodes 93–94	
2017	Battle Trip	Contestant with Park Na-rae	Episodes 35–36	
2017	We Got Married	Cast member, paired with Choi Min-yong	Episodes 364–373	
2018	Life Bar	Host	Episodes 52–72	
2018	Love Ranking	Host		
2018	Women Plus	Host	Season 2	
2018	TRUST GAME - Love Catcher	Panelist (known as observers)		
2018	Real Life Men and Women 2	Cast member	Season 2	
2018–2019	Not the Same Person You Used to Know	Host		
2018–2019	Village Survival, the Eight	Cast member	Season 1–2	
2019	Six-Party Talks	MC		
2019	Prison Life of Fools	Cast member	Episode 1–26	
2019	The Fishermen and the City	Cast member	Episode 76–107	
2019	Funding Together	Cast member		
2019–2020	Wook Talk	Host		
2019–2020	TMI News	Cast member	Episode 7–56	
2020	Friday Joy Package	Cast member	Episode 1–11	
2020	K-pop Cultural Center	Cast member		
2020	Don't Be Jealous	Host		
2020–present	Don't be the First One!	Host	Episode 1–present	
2020–2023	Dogs Are Incredible	Host	Student (Cast member)	
2020–2021	I Live Alone	Cast Member	Episode 333–present	
2021	Wasup K-Grandma	Host	with Jang Yoon-jeong	
2021–present	The Story of the Day Biting the Tail	Host		
2021–present	The Da Vinci Note	Host		
2021–2022	Welcome, First Time in Korea?	Host		
2021	I Need Women	Host		
2021	Call me	Host		
2021	Earth in	Host		
2022	Fantastic Family	Judge		
2022	Jump Like a Witch	Cast Member		
2022	Room Corner 1 Row	Host		
2022	Secret Man and Woman	Host		
2022	Next Label	Host	with Shin Hyun-ji	
2022	Beautiful	Host		
2022	Crazy Tongue	Host		
2022	Around the World at Birth	Panelist / Host	with Simon Dominic and Song Min-ho	
2022–2023	Jisun Cinema Mind	Host	with Park Ji-sun; Season 1–2	
2022–2023	Korea After School: Field Trip	Host	Season 1–2	
2023	Rice Planting Club	Host	with Kim Kwang-kyu and Park Myung-soo	
2023	Girls Night Out	Host		
2023	Hidden Heroes	Host	with Jonathan	

=== Hosting ===
Year	Title	Notes	Ref.
2020	2020 MBC Entertainment Awards	With Jun Hyun-moo and Ahn Bo-hyun	
2021	2021 SBS Entertainment Awards	with Lee Seung-gi and Han Hye-jin	
2022	2022 SBS Entertainment Awards	with Tak Jae-hoon and Lee Hyun-yi	
2023	59th Grand Bell Awards	with Cha In-pyo	
2024	2024 SBS Entertainment Awards	with Jeon Hyun-moo and Lee Hyun-i	

=== Web shows ===
Year	Title	Role	Notes	Ref.
2021	Girls High School Mystery Class	Cast member	Episode 1–16 / Season 1	
2021	Change Days	Host	Season 1	
2021	Love Catcher in Seoul	Host		
2021	Double Trouble	Host		
2021–2022	Girls High School Mystery Class	Cast Member	Season 2	
2022	Speak Out	Host		
2022	Change Days	Host	Season 2	
2022	Neighborhood is Different	Host		
2022	Love Catcher in Bali	Host		
2023	Webtoon Singer	Host	with Choi Min-ho and Yoo Se-yoon	
2023–present	Salon Drip	Host	Season 1–2	

== Accolades ==
=== Awards and nominations ===
Name of the award ceremony, year presented, category, nominee of the award, and the result of the nomination
Award ceremony	Year	Category	Nominee / Work	Result	Ref.
Asia Model Awards	2020	Fashionista Award	Jang Do-yeon	Won	
Baeksang Arts Awards	2015	Best Variety Performer – Female	Comedy Big League	Nominated	
Baeksang Arts Awards	2016	Best Variety Performer – Female	Comedy Big League	Nominated	
Baeksang Arts Awards	2019	Best Variety Performer – Female	Comedy Big League	Nominated	
Baeksang Arts Awards	2020	Best Variety Performer – Female	Food Bless You	Nominated	
Baeksang Arts Awards	2021	Best Variety Performer – Female	I Live Alone, Don't be the First One	Won	
Baeksang Arts Awards	2024	Best Variety Performer – Female	Jang Do-yoon	Nominated	
Baeksang Arts Awards	2025	Best Female Variety Performer	Jang Do-yoon	Nominated	
Baeksang Arts Awards	2026	Best Female Variety Performer	Jang Do-yoon	Nominated	
Blue Dragon Series Awards	2022	Best Female Entertainer	Girls High School Mystery Class	Nominated	
Blue Dragon Series Awards	2023	Best Female Entertainer	Change Days	Nominated	
Blue Dragon Series Awards	2024	Best Female Entertainer	High School Mystery Club Season 3	Won	
Brand Customer Loyalty Award	2021	Best Female Comedian	Jang Do-yeon	Won	
Brand Customer Loyalty Award	2022	Best Female Comedian	Jang Do-yeon	Won	
Brand of the Year Awards	2020	Entertainer of the Year – Female	Jang Do-yeon	Won	
Brand of the Year Awards	2021	Female Variety Show Star	Jang Do-yeon	Won	
Brand of the Year Awards	2022	Entertainment – Female	Jang Do-yeon	Won	
Elle Style Awards	2018	Girl Crush Award	Jang Do-yeon	Won	
KBS Entertainment Awards	2021	Best Entertainer Award in Show/Variety Category	Dogs Are Incredible	Won	
KBS Entertainment Awards	2021	Top Excellence Award in Show/Variety Category	Dogs Are Incredible	Nominated	
KBS Entertainment Awards	2022	Popularity Award	Dogs Are Incredible	Won	
KBS Entertainment Awards	2022	Top Excellence Award in Reality Category	Dogs Are Incredible	Nominated	
Korea First Brand Awards	2020	Best Female Variety Star	Jang Do-yeon	Won	
Korea Broadcasting Awards	2021	Best MC Award	Jang Do-yeon	Won	
MBC Entertainment Awards	2019	Top Excellence Award	Funding Together	Nominated	
MBC Entertainment Awards	2019	Best Entertainer Award	Funding Together	Won	
MBC Entertainment Awards	2020	Excellence Award in Variety Category – Female	I Live Alone	Won	
MBC Entertainment Awards	2024	Top Excellence Award in Variety Category – Female	Radio Star; I'm Born to Play Music; Stingy Man	Won	
SBS Entertainment Awards	2020	Hot Star Award – TV Category	Park Jang's LOL	Won	
SBS Entertainment Awards	2020	Excellence Award in Show/Variety Category	Park Jang's LOL	Won	
SBS Entertainment Awards	2021	Next Level Award	Kkomu, I Need a Warm-up	Won	
tvN10 Awards	2016	Best Comedienne	Comedy Big League	Nominated	
tvN10 Awards	2016	Variety "Slave" Award	Comedy Big League	Nominated	

=== State honors ===
Name of country, year given, and name of honor
Country Or Organization	Year	Honor Or Award	Ref.
South Korea (Note: Honors are given at the Korean Popular Culture and Arts Awards, arranged by the Korea Creative Content Agency and hosted by the Ministry of Culture, Sports and Tourism. They are awarded to those who have contributed to the arts and South Korea's pop culture.)	2020	Minister of Culture, Sports and Tourism Commendation	

=== Listicles ===
Name of publisher, year listed, name of listicle, and placement
Publisher	Year	Listicle	Placement	Ref.
Forbes	2020	Korea Power Celebrity 40	22nd	
