= Little Black Dress (film) =

- Promotional poster for Little Black Dress
- Hangul: 마이 블랙 미니드레스
- RR: Mai beullaek mini deureseu
- MR: Mai pŭllaek mini tŭresŭ
- Directed by: Heo In-moo
- Screenplay by: Heo In-moo
- Based on: My Black Mini Dress by Kim Min-seo
- Produced by: Jang Suk-bin; Jung-hyun; Kim Woo-sang; Kim Jung-bok; Ahn Soo-yeon
- Starring: Yoon Eun-hye; Park Han-byul; Cha Ye-ryun; Yoo In-na
- Cinematography: Yoon Hong-sik
- Edited by: Hahm Sung-won
- Production company: Tori Pictures
- Distributed by: CJ Entertainment
- Release date: March 24, 2011
- Running time: 107 minutes
- Country: South Korea
- Language: Korean
- Box office: US$2,121,635

Little Black Dress (Korean: 마이 블랙 미니드레스; lit. 'My Black Mini Dress') is a 2011 South Korean film starring Yoon Eun-hye, Park Han-byul, Cha Ye-ryun and Yoo In-na. Based on the 2009 chick lit novel My Black Mini Dress by Kim Min-seo, the film revolves around the dreams, failures, and friendship of four 24-year-old women still looking for a direction in life.

== Plot ==
Yoo-min (Yoon Eun-hye), Hye-ji (Park Han-byul), Soo-jin (Cha Ye-ryun) and Min-hee (Yoo In-na) were the best of friends in college. While majoring in theater and film at an elite university, they were united by their passion for Seoul's clubbing scene and luxury shopping, but life isn't so easy now that they're in the real world. Clueless about what to do with her life, Yoo-min takes up a job as an assistant to a famous TV scriptwriter in order to buy an expensive black mini dress (or "little black dress"), but her work turns out to be babysitting her boss's twin boys. Rich girl Min-hee plans to study abroad but she's not going anywhere until she improves her English. Socialite Hye-ji shoots to fame after appearing in a Levi's ad, but her newfound stardom creates a rift with her friends. Aspiring actress Soo-jin is at her wit's end after failing so many auditions, and things only get worse when her father goes bankrupt.

== Cast ==
- Yoon Eun-hye as Lee Yoo-min
- Park Han-byul as Yoon Hye-ji
- Cha Ye-ryun as Choi Soo-jin
- Yoo In-na as Kang Min-hee
- Choi Yoon-young as Kim Young-mi
- Lee Yong-woo as Seok-won
- Jeon Soo-kyung as writer
- Shin Dong-ho as Yoo Seung-won
- Gil Eun-hye as assistant writer
- Lee Mi-do as pre-college girl
- Moon Soo-jong as Yoo-min's father
- Ko Gyu-pil as Yoo-shin
- Ahn Chi-yong as Min-hee's father
- Won Jong-rye as Min-hee's mother
- Kim Choon-gi as Young-mi's father
- Choi Min-geum as Young-mi's mother
- Paul Stafford as English teacher
- Lee Chun-hee as Soo-hwan (cameo)
- Ko Chang-seok as director (cameo)
- Shin Seung-hwan as assistant director (cameo)
- Kim Kwang-kyu as pre-college girl's father (cameo)
- Moon Hee-kyung as Yoo-min's mother (cameo)
- Baek Soo-ryun as lottery ticket grandmother (cameo)
