= Jang Sung-kyu =

South Korean television host (born 1983)

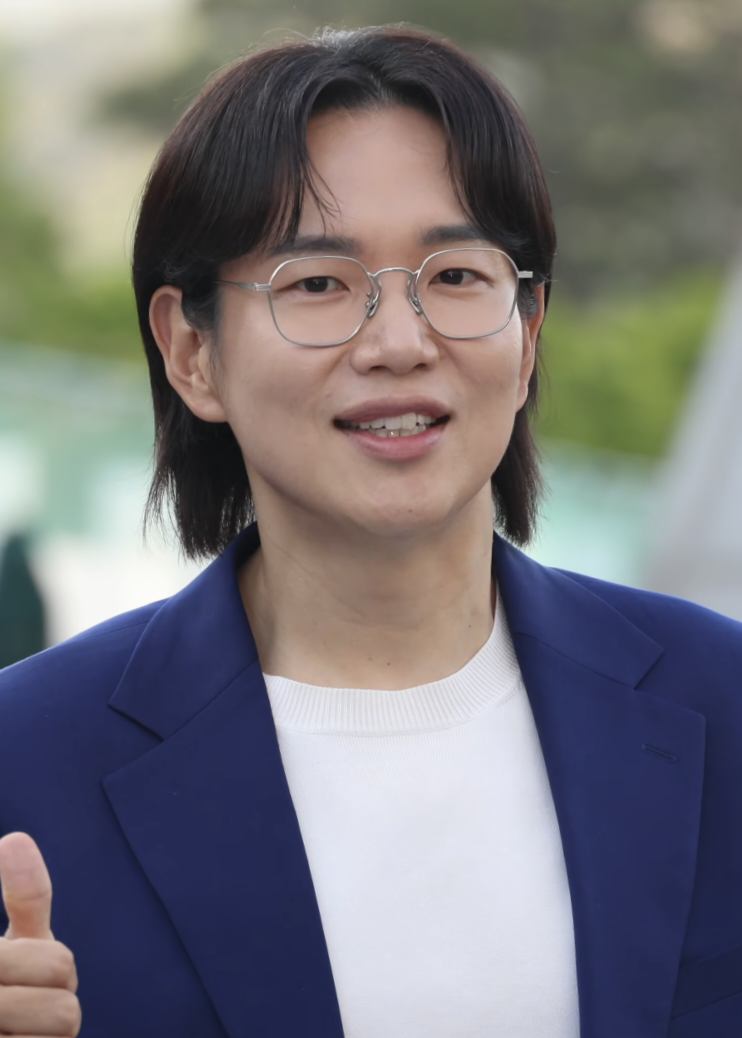
- Jang in May 2026
- Born: April 21, 1983 (age 43); Seoul, South Korea
- Occupations: Television host; radio personality
- Years active: 2011–present
- Agent(s): SLL, SM Culture & Contents (since 2025)
- Spouse: Lee Yu-mi (m. 2014)
- Children: 2

Korean name
- Hangul: 장성규
- Hanja: 張成圭
- RR: Jang Seonggyu
- MR: Chang Sŏnggyu

Jang Sung-kyu (Korean: 장성규; born April 21, 1983) is a South Korean television host and former news announcer. He was formerly a news announcer for JTBC until March 2019. He is currently signed to SLL (acronym for Studio LuluLala; formerly JTBC Studios), a subsidiary company under JTBC, working as a freelancer and starred in YouTube variety show Workman. Since July 2025, he signed contract with SM Culture & Contents.

== Philanthropy ==
On March 8, 2022, Jang donated ₩30 million to the Disaster Relief Association to help the victims of the massive wildfire in Uljin forest fire 2022 that started in Uljin, North Gyeongsang Province and has spread to Samcheok, Gangwon Province, South Korea. Jang additionally donated ₩20 million to the Embassy of Ukraine, Seoul to assist Ukrainian victims in the Russian invasion of Ukraine.

On February 8, 2023, Jang donated ₩23 million through YouTube to help 2023 Turkey–Syria earthquakes, by donating money through the Turkey and Syria Recovery Fund.

In March 2025, Jang donated ₩30 million to the National Disaster Relief Association for the wildfire victims in the Gyeongsang region.

== Filmography ==
=== Television series ===
Year	Title	Role	Notes	Ref.
2022	May I Help You?	DJ	Cameo (episode 4)	

=== Variety shows ===
==== Current ====
Year	Title	Role
2018	Movie Room	Host
2020	Folk Us	Host
2021	My Fanta-home	Host
2021	The Story of the Day Biting the Tail S2	Host
2021	The Da Vinci Note	Host
2021	Racket Boys	Host
2022	Surprise: Secret Room	Host
2022	Showdown	Host
2022	Scout 3.0	Host
2022	Routine King	Host
2022	Avatar Singer	Host
2023	The Queen	Host
2023	Edu K-dol	Host
2023	Show Queen	Host

==== Former ====
Year	Title	Role
2011	New Recruits	Cast member
2016	Knowing Bros	Special Cast
2019	Respect Private Life	Host
2019	Super Hearer	Host
2019	Not the Same Person You Used to Know V2	Host
2019	Queendom	Host
2019	Hogu Chart	Host
2019	Ban Ban Show	Host
2020	Oh! My Part, You	Host (Pilot episode)
2020	Wanna Be Singers	Cast member
2020	Like Likes Like	Cast member
2020	Road to Kingdom	Host
2020	Normal Family	Host
2020	Don't Be Jealous	Host
2020	The Voice of Korea (Season 3)	Host
2020	Idol on Quiz	Host
2020	My Working Vlog	Host (Pilot episodes)
2022	Apocalypse: Earth Defenders of Chaos	Host
2023	The Wedding War	Host

=== News ===
Year	Title	Role
2012	JTBC Weekend News	Sub-anchor
2012	JTBC Entertainment Scoop	Co-anchor
2015–2016	JTBC News Morning&	Sub-anchor

=== Web shows ===
Year	Title	Role	Ref.
2019–2025	Workman	Host	
2022	Zero-Sum Game	Host	
2022	Jang Seong-gyu-universe 2	Host	

=== Hosting ===
Year	Title	Notes	Ref.
2019	MBC Gayo Daejejeon	with Im Yoon-ah and Cha Eun-woo	
2020	MBC Gayo Daejejeon	with Im Yoon-ah and Kim Seon-ho	
2021	18th EBS International Documentary Film Festival		
2021	MBC Gayo Daejejeon	with Im Yoon-ah and Lee Jun-ho	
2022	MBC Gayo Daejejeon	with Im Yoon-ah and Lee Jun-ho	
2023	2023 KBS Drama Awards	with Seol In-ah and Rowoon	
2024	2024 KBS Drama Awards	with Moon Sang-min and Seohyun	
2025	2025 KBS Drama Awards	with Moon Sang-min and Nam Ji-hyun	

=== Radio show ===
Year	Title	Network	Ref.
2019	Good Morning FM It's Jang Sung-kyu	MBC	

== Discography ==
=== Singles ===
==== As lead artist ====
Title	Year	Peak chart positions	Album
Title	Year	KOR	Album
"A Mother's Smile" (엄마의 미소) with Kim Dong-hyun	2020	—	Wanna Be Singers "First Ballad"
"Workman (prod. GroovyRoom)" (워크맨) feat. Sik-K, Jay Park	2020	—	Non-album single

== Awards and nominations ==
Year	Award	Category	Nominated work	Result
2019	2019 MBC Entertainment Awards	Rookie Award (Radio)	Good Morning FM It's Jang Sung-kyu	Won
2019	2019 MBC Entertainment Awards	Rookie Award (Variety - Male)	My Little Television V2, Omniscient Interfering View	Won
2020	56th Baeksang Arts Awards	Best Variety Performer (Male)	Movie Room	Nominated

=== Listicles ===
Name of publisher, year listed, name of listicle, and placement
Publisher	Year	Listicle	Placement	Ref.
Forbes	2020	Korea Power Celebrity	27th	
