= Kim Jang-hoon =

South Korean singer (born 1963)

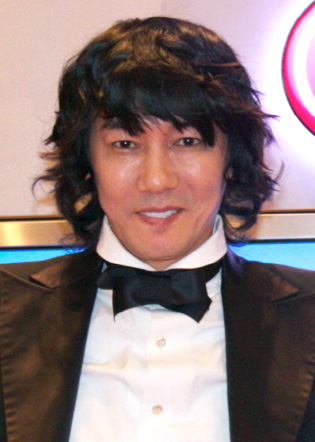
- Kim in 2011

Background information
- Born: 14 August 1963 (age 63)
- Origin: Seoul, South Korea
- Genre: K-pop
- Occupation: Singer
- Years active: 1991–present
- Labels: Concert World, LOEN Entertainment
- Website: kimjanghoon

- Korean name
- Hangul: 김장훈
- Hanja: 金章勳
- RR: Gim Janghun
- MR: Kim Changhun

Kim Jang-hoon (Korean: 김장훈; Hanja: 金章勳; born 14 August 1963) is a South Korean singer, known for his rock ballads.

== Early life and education ==
Kim dropped out of school and worked as a DJ at cafes. In 1991, he released his debut album. Cho Dongik mainly wrote and arranged his music. That album included "On a sunny day", written by You Hee-yeol, "Always between you and I", written by Cho Dongik, "To the tomorrow", written by Cho Dongik. His second album including "Now", was released in 1993. His third album was I just sang my song.

== Career ==
On 27 September 2011, Kim released the single "Breakups Are So Like Me" which featured Heechul of boy band Super Junior, who also starred in the music video. Since Heechul enlisted for mandatory military service on 1 September, his parts during the performance on Music Bank and Show! Music Core, was filled in by bandmates, Yesung, Eunhyuk and Shindong, who performed with Kim.

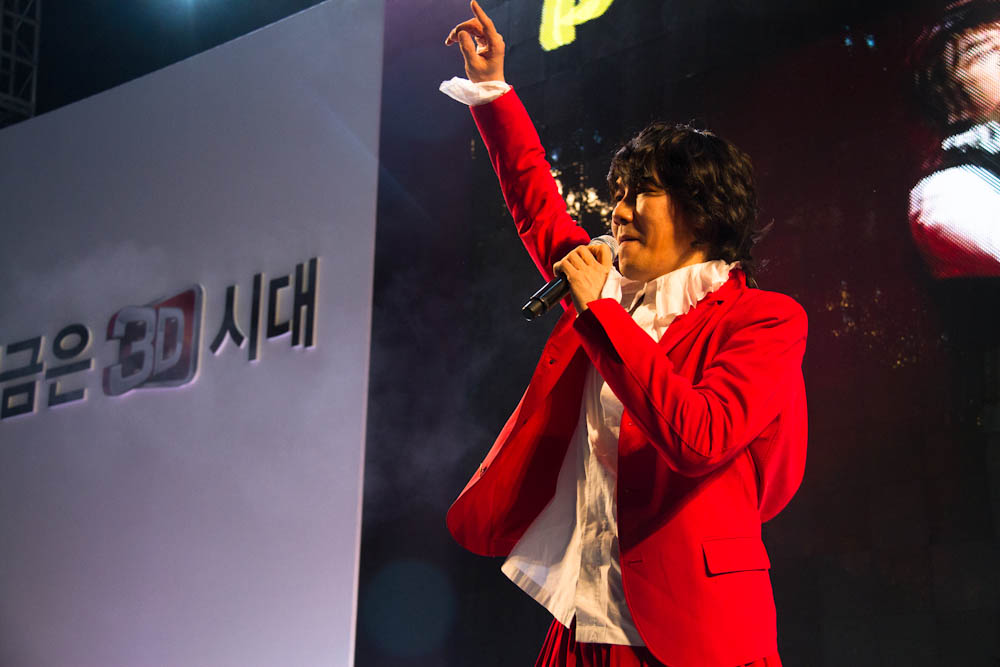
Kim at LG Cinema 3D World Festival in April 2012

Also, Kim is on many popular T.V. variety programs as an entertainer. Kim is the #1 musician at University Campuses for 10 years and his popularity ranges from people in their teens to their 60s.

Since his debut, Kim has twenty-two (22) albums, including his best remix albums, digital singles, and Original Soundtrack albums. Moreover, throughout his career, Kim performed at over 1,000 different concerts and shows, including fifteen (15) of his own exclusive concerts, in China and South Korea.

In 2012, Kim released his 10th full-length album, the first in six years. He released a music video for the title track "Nothing" featuring Paris Hilton.

In 2014, Kim released, along with the girl group Crayon Pop, a new single titled "HERO".

=== Charitable work ===
In South Korea, Kim is widely known as the "Donation Angel", donating over 10 billion South Korean won over the course of ten years to various causes. He is active in the Liancourt Rocks territorial dispute between Japan and South Korea.

In July 2012, while during his concert at the Nokia Theatre L.A. Live in California, Kim received a letter signed by U.S. President Barack Obama, notifying him of his winning the President's Volunteer Service Award.

== Discography ==
Album#	Album Information	Tracklist
1st	Vol 1 always between you and I: Released: 15 September 1991; Language: Korean	1. "Always between you and I"; 2. "In there" 3. "To the tomorrow" 4. "Go separate ways" 5. "On a sunny day" 6. "To the childhood" 7. "For the days left" 8. "Someday"
2nd	Vol 2 Now: Released: 10 December 1994; Language: Korean	1. "Now"; 2. "I want to love" 3. "For the hard world" 4. "When I was a young" 5. "To the tearless world" 6. "As we did the past" 7. "My old song" 8. "Now(instrumental)"
3rd	Vol 3 I just sang my song: Released: 10 January 1997; Language: Korean	1. "live happily without thinking of me" 2. "Because I loved you" 3. "I just sang my song" 4. "The hardtime become my song" 5. "I am breathing" 6. "Revolution"; 7. "Bluebird"; 8. "It will go halves" 9. "I just sang my song (edit)" 10. "On such a day"
4th	Vol 4 1998 BALLADS FOR TEARS: Released: 10 March 1998; Language: Korean	1. "If you were like me" 2. "Should this life sometimes deceive you" 3. "When we live" 4. "On a sunny day" 5. "Always you and I"; 6. "To the tomorrow" 7. "As we did the past" 8. "She has gone" 9. "MOTHER"; 10. "If you were like me(Acoustic Version)"
5th	Vol 5 Fool: Released: 5 October 1999; Language: Korean	1. "The sad gift" 2. "The way to forget her" 3. "When tomorrow comes" 4. "GOOD BYE DAY"; 5. "We never meet but part" 6. "The fool" 7. "Letting her go" 8. "The ring" 9. "The Opera"; 10. "Honey, good-bye" 11. "The gift"
6th	Vol 6 INNOCENCE: Released: 29 November 2000; Language: Korean	1. "The monologue" 2. "Last winter (Christmas Version)"; 3. "The fool" 4. "I am a man" 5. "The season of the heart" 6. "Your story" 7. "Search for another me" 8. "Our joyful day" 9. "Like a movie" 10. "Elly, My Love"; 11. "If I could do" 12. "Please"
7th	Vol 7 Natural: Released: 13 December 2001; Language: Korean	1. "The clown" 2. "Sorry"; 3. "Love"; 4. "Oh! Beautiful"; 5. "The Day"; 6. "Go away" 7. "After a while" 8. "The ice rainbow" 9. "On your little hands" 10. "You"; 11. "Oh! Beautiful (Club version)"
8th	Novelty Hero Newspaper with Cho PD: Released: 2004; Language: Korean	
9th	Vol A Piece: Released: 4 May 2005; Language: Korean	1. "Show"; 2. "My Profile"; 3. "I Love You"; 4. "Are you happy?" 5. "Panic Attack"; 6. "My father" 7. "A burned tree" 8. "A man waiting for you" 9. "Just stay as you are" 10. "Good-bye my brother" 11. "The song for January"
10th	Vol 9 It's me: Released: 24 November 2006; Language: Korean	1. "Honey"; 2. "Face washing" 3. "Let's run and run" 4. "A couple(Happy together)" 5. "I laugh because I am a man" 6. "I cann’t forget" 7. "On a day long after we met" 8. "Go round and round (Zucker version)" 9. "To my angel" 10. "Honey (Mania version)" 11. "Let her go out of my heart"
11th	Project : Maestro: Released: 28 September 2007; Language: Korean	1. "I laugh because I am a man" 2. "Romance"
12th	A Shower - Digital Single: Released: 29 April 2008; Language: Korean	1. "A shower" (original version); 2. "A shower" (pop version)
13th	Letter to Kim Hyun Sik - tribute album: Released: 4 November 2010; Language: Korean	1. "Spring, Summer, Fall, Winter"; 2. "I've loved" 3. "Like rain, like the music" 4. "A Midsummer Night's Dream"; 5. "Faddist"; 6. "Making Memories"; 7. "Always by your side" 8. "My love by my side" 9. "Love Love Love"; 10. "Separation of the terminus" 11. "Korean man (instrumental)"
14th	Make Me Cry Again (w/ Psy) - Digital Single: Released: 2010; Language: Korean	1. "Make Me Cry Again" (original version)

== Public service ==
- 2008, Publicity Ambassador for Voluntary Agency Network of Korea (VANK)
- 2008, Publicity Ambassador for Olympic Park
- 2022, Ambassadors for the Festival of Culture and Arts with Disabilities with Jung Eun-hye

== Awards ==
- 2002: The Prize for Good Deed Star in Current Year
- 2008: 4th The Grand Prize for Contribution to Society-Special Award
- 2008: 6th The Prize for Glorious Civilized People
- 2012: President's Volunteer Service Award
