= Tzuyang =

South Korean YouTuber (born 1996)

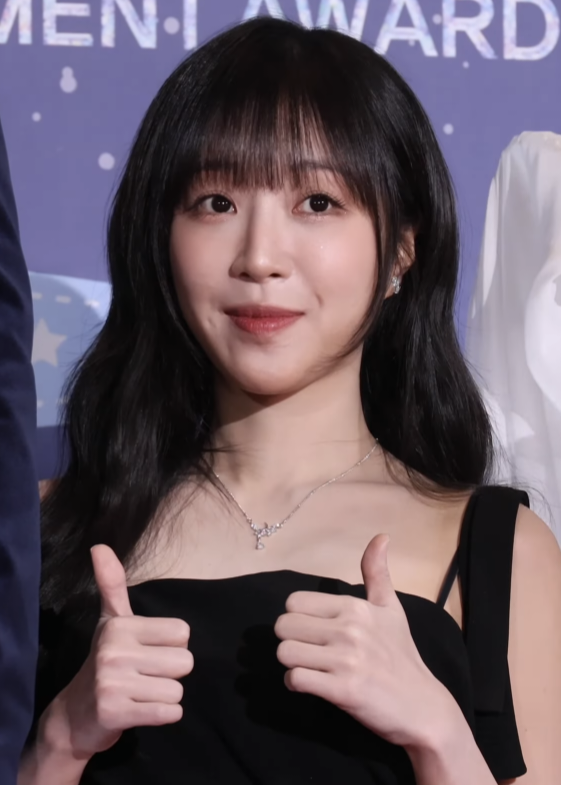
- Tzuyang in 2025
- Born: Park Jung-won; April 14, 1996 (age 30); Seoul, South Korea

Instagram information
- Page: tzuyang70
- Years active: 2018–present
- Followers: 290,000

YouTube information
- Channel: tzuyang
- Years active: 2018–present
- Genre: Mukbang
- Subscribers: 13.2 million
- Views: 3.5 billion

Korean name
- Hangul: 박정원
- Hanja: 朴正元
- RR: Bak Jeongwon
- MR: Pak Chŏngwŏn
- Last updated: 4 January 2025

Park Jung-won (Korean: 박정원; born April 14, 1996), known by the handle Tzuyang (쯔양), is a South Korean mukbang YouTuber.

== Early life and education ==
Tzuyang was born Park Jung-won in Seoul, South Korea, on April 14, 1996. She attended Mirae High School of Science and Technology, and then attended a university.

== Career ==
Before starting her mukbang channels, she was forced to work in her former boyfriend's bar.

In 2018, Tzuyang started her mukbang channels on Afreeca and YouTube after people suggested it was a good way for her to enable her to live how she wanted. She later clarified in 2024 that she was blackmailed into starting the channels in order to preclude the release of videos of her in sexually compromised positions.

She gained rapid popularity due to her ability to stay slim despite eating massive amounts of food. She reached the 1 million subscribers milestone in 2019, and 10 million subscribers by 2024.

In 2020, she was embroiled in an undisclosed advertising controversy, for which she apologized for not marking the videos as paid advertisements.

In February 2024, a mukbang video that she posted featuring Kim Ji Young, a comedian who played a Filipina named Nitung (니퉁) in the South Korean television comedy show, Gag Concert, sparked a backlash for using stereotyped accents and a mockery of Filipino culture. The incident drew criticism from both Korean and international viewers, with many calling it racist and insulting to Filipinos. The video was removed eight days after it was initially released, and Tzuyang issued a public apology in Tagalog, English, and Korean, acknowledging her shortcomings and promising more sensitivity in the future.

In a survey conducted by Gallup Korea from March, 22 to April, 5, 2024, she was named Korea's favorite YouTuber, gathering 5.2% of 1,777 votes.

On 31 December 2025, Tzuyang won the Popularity Award at 2025 MBC Entertainment Awards.

== Personal life ==
=== Allegations and instances of physical abuse and blackmailing ===
In July 2024, Tzuyang revealed that she had been a victim of physical abuse by a former boyfriend who extorted her to the tune of ₩4 billion (equivalent to ₩4.08 billion or US$3.05 million in 2025) and disclosed her most intimate moments to other YouTubers. He was also the manager of the creative agency created to manage her, but he would take 70% of her earnings through an exploitative contract. The criminal cases against him were closed when he "took his own life", leaving her unable to reclaim the money owed to her.

Subsequently, in August 2024, she reported four YouTubers, Jeon Guk-jin, Caracula, Gujeyeok, and Crocodile, to authorities for blackmailing her over her past actions. The YouTube channels belonging to Jeon Guk-jin, Caracula, and Gujeyeok were demonetized by YouTube accordingly. Her former boyfriend's lawyer, surnamed Choi, was also indicted for coercing, blackmailing, and extorting his client. It was also reported that, while Choi was defending his client's company, and additionally after he passed away, he was the one leaking information about her to the YouTubers, allegedly attempting to extort Tzuyang and receiving ₩23.1 million (equivalent to ₩23.59 million or US$17,601.18 in 2025) from her, while preventing his client from taking responsibility for the threats she face.

Tzuyang took a three-month break from producing content, returning to YouTube in October 2024. In November 2024, she received the Diamond Creator Award from YouTube for reaching the 10 million subscribers milestone. To commemorate the milestone, she donated ₩200 million (equivalent to ₩204.25 million or US$152,391.14 in 2025) to World Vision. ₩100 million (equivalent to ₩102.12 million or US$76,195.57 in 2025) of this donation came from sponsors of her channel.

In July 2024, a defamation case was filed against YouTuber Kim Se-ui, head of the channel Hover Lab, also known as Garo Sero Research Institute, and an investigation into the case is under way as of October 2025. A separate lawsuit was filed in February 2025 against Kim alleging blackmail, coercion, and violation of privacy. The Seoul High Court eventually ruled in favor of Tzuyang, ordering Kim to pay ₩10 million (equivalent to ₩10.21 million or US$7,619.56 in 2025) per future video if he mentioned Tzuyang. Kim was also ordered to remove existing videos about Tzuyang. Additionally, two restraining orders against Kim were ordered regarding Tzuyang, after she had been recognized as a victim of stalking.

In May 2025, two women who blackmailed and extorted Tzuyang about ₩216 million (equivalent to ₩220.59 million or US$164,582.43 in 2025) were indicted. In August 2025, they were given suspended sentences and issued restraining orders after they had made full restitution. By way of restitution, they also made additional payment to Tzuyang.

=== Health ===
In 2025, Tzuyang published her medical checkup revealing that her stomach is 40 percent larger than those with similar builds and her body had naturally adjusted to her substantial food intake. She also revealed that she suffers from retinitis pigmentosa, a degenerative disease affecting her sight, and may eventually be blind.
