= Kim Wan-gi =

South Korean long-distance runner

Personal information
- Nationality: South Korean
- Born: 8 July 1968 (age 58) Seoul, South Korea

Sport
- Sport: Long-distance running
- Event: Marathon
Medal record
Representing South Korea
Summer Universiade
Silver medal – second place	1993 Buffalo	Marathon

Kim Wan-gi (born 8 July 1968) is a South Korean long-distance runner. He competed in the men's marathon at the 1992 Summer Olympics and the 1996 Summer Olympics.

He was described as one of three people who led the revival of Korean marathoning in the early 1990s, along with Hwang Young-jo and Lee Bong-ju.
