= MBC Entertainment Awards =

South Korean annual award ceremony

- Current: 2024 MBC Entertainment Awards
- Awarded for: Excellence in variety entertainment
- Location: Seoul
- Country: South Korea
- Presented by: Munhwa Broadcasting Corporation
- First award: 1990
- Final award: 2025

Television/radio coverage
- Runtime: approximately 140 – 240 minutes

Korean name
- Hangul: MBC 방송연예대상
- Hanja: MBC 放送演藝大賞
- RR: MBC bangsong yeonye daesang
- MR: MBC pangsong yŏnye taesang

The MBC Entertainment Awards (Korean: MBC 방송연예대상) is a Korean awards ceremony held annually and sponsored by MBC. The awards ceremony is held at the end of each year and lasts approximately 140 minutes, being broadcast in two parts on MBC.

== Hosts ==
Year	Hosts	Ref.
2001	Kim Yong-man, Lee Kyeong-shil, Kim Gook-jin	
2002	Lee Kyung-kyu, Park Kyung-lim	
2003	Park Soo-hong, Kim Jung-hwa	
2004	Park Soo-hong, Kim Won-hee	
2005	Jeong Ji-yeong, Hyun Young, Kim Je-dong	
2006	Lee Kyung-kyu, Hyun Young	
2007	Lee Hyuk-jae	
2008	Lee Hyuk-jae	
2009	Lee Hyuk-jae	
2010	Park Mi-sun, Lee Kyeong-shil	
2011	Yoon Jong-shin, Park Ha-sun	
2012	Kang Ho-dong, Kwanghee, Kang So-ra	
2013	Kim Gu-ra, Kim Soo-ro, So Yi-hyun	
2014	Kim Sung-joo, Park Hyung-sik, Kim Sung-ryung	
2015	Kim Sung-joo, Kim Gu-ra, Han Chae-ah	
2016	Kim Sung-joo, Jun Hyun-moo, Lee Sung-kyung	
2017	Kim Hee-chul, Yang Se-hyung, Han Hye-jin	
2018	Jun Hyun-moo, Seungri (Big Bang), Hyeri (Girl's Day)	
2019	Jun Hyun-moo, Hwasa and P.O	
2020	Ahn Bo-hyun, Jang Do-yeon, Jun Hyun-moo	
2021	Jun Hyun-moo, Lee Sang-yi and Kim Se-jeong	
2022	Jun Hyun-moo, Lee Yi-kyung and Kang Min-kyung	
2023	Jun Hyun-moo, Lee Se-young and Dex	
2024	Jun Hyun-moo, Yoon Eun-hye and Lee Jang-woo	
2025	Jun Hyun-moo, Jang Do-yeon	

== History of winners ==
Sources: From 2010 onward.

=== MBC Comedy Broadcasting Awards Grand Prize (1990–1994) ===
Year	Winner
1990	Joo Byung-jin
1991	Lee Kyung-kyu
1992	Lee Kyung-kyu
1993	Lee Hong-ryeol
1994	Lee Kyeong-shil

=== MBC Comedy Daesang (1995–2000) ===
Year	Winner
1995	Lee Kyung-kyu
1996	Kim Gook-jin
1997	Lee Kyung-kyu
1998	Kim Gook-jin
1999	Seo Kyung-seok
2000	Kim Yong-man

=== MBC Entertainment Awards (2001 - present) ===
Time #	Year	Grand Prize (Daesang)	Program
1st	2001	Park Kyung-lim	—
2nd	2002	Kim Yong-man	—
3rd	2003	Kim Yong-man	—
4th	2004	Lee Kyung-kyu	—
5th	2005	Lee Kyung-kyu	—
6th	2006	Yoo Jae-suk	Infinite Challenge
7th	2007	Lee Soon-jae	High Kick!
7th	2007	Infinite Challenge	Infinite Challenge
8th	2008	Kang Ho-dong	The Knee-Drop Guru
9th	2009	Yoo Jae-suk	Infinite Challenge
10th	2010	Yoo Jae-suk	Infinite Challenge
11th	2011	I Am a Singer	I Am a Singer
12th	2012	Park Myeong-su	Infinite Challenge, I Am a Singer (Season 2), Indulge in Comedy
13th	2013	Dad! Where Are We Going?	Dad! Where Are We Going?
14th	2014	Yoo Jae-suk	Infinite Challenge
15th	2015	Kim Gu-ra	King of Mask Singer, Radio Star, My Little Television, Quiz to Change the World
16th	2016	Yoo Jae-suk	Infinite Challenge
17th	2017	Jun Hyun-moo	I Live Alone
18th	2018	Lee Young-ja	Omniscient Interfering View
19th	2019	Park Na-rae	I Live Alone, Where Is My Home
20th	2020	Yoo Jae-suk	Hangout with Yoo
21st	2021	Yoo Jae-suk	Hangout with Yoo
22nd	2022	Jun Hyun-moo	I Live Alone, Omniscient Interfering View
23rd	2023	Kian84	I Live Alone
24th	2024	Jun Hyun-moo	I Live Alone, Omniscient Interfering View, Class Beyond Border, Song Stealer
25th	2025	Yoo Jae-suk	Hangout with Yoo

=== Best Program Award ===
Time #	Year	Best Program Award
1st	2003	Nonstop 4 (Best Viewer's Choice Program Awards)
2nd	2004	Exclamation Point (Best Viewer's Choice Program Awards)
3rd	2006	Infinite Challenge (Best Program Award)
4th	2007	Infinite Challenge (Best Program Award)
5th	2008	Infinite Challenge (Best PD's Choice Program Awards)
6th	2009	Infinite Challenge (Best Viewer's Choice Program Awards)
7th	2010	Quiz to Change the World (Best Program Award)
8th	2011	I Am a Singer (Best Entertainment Program of the Year)
9th	2012	Radio Star (Best Entertainment Program of the Year)
10th	2013	Infinite Challenge (Best Viewer's Choice Program Awards)
11th	2014	Infinite Challenge (Best Entertainment Program of the Year)
12th	2015	Infinite Challenge (Best Entertainment Program of the Year)
13th	2016	Infinite Challenge (Best Entertainment Program of the Year)
14th	2017	I Live Alone (Best Entertainment Program of the Year)
15th	2018	I Live Alone (Best Entertainment Program of the Year)
16th	2019	I Live Alone (Best Entertainment Program of the Year)
17th	2020	Hangout with Yoo (Program of the Year)
18th	2021	Hangout with Yoo (Program of the Year)
19th	2022	I Live Alone (Program of the Year)
20th	2023	Adventure by Accident 3 (Program of the Year)
21st	2024	I Live Alone (Program of the Year)
22nd	2025	Wonder Coach (Program of the Year)

=== Top Excellence Award ===
==== 2001 – 2020 ====
Time #	Year	Show / Variety	Comedy / Sitcom	Music / Talk Show	Radio
1st	2001	Lee Kyung-kyu	Choi Yang-rak; Yang Dong-geun; Park Kyung-lim	—N/a	—N/a
2nd	2002	Kang Ho-dong (Match Made in Heaven)	Kim Kyung-Sik; Jeong Da-bin	—N/a	—N/a
3rd	2003	Kim Yong-man; Yoo Jae-suk	Jeong Jun-ha	—N/a	—N/a
4th	2004	Kim Yong-man; Lee Kyung-kyu	Han Ye-seul	—N/a	—N/a
5th	2005	Lee Yoon-seok; Park Hee-jin	Kim Je-dong; Kim Won-hee	—N/a	—N/a
6th	2006	Park Myeong-su; Jo Hye-ryun	Jung Sung-ho; Jung Sun-hee	—N/a	—N/a
7th	2007	Kim Jae-dong; Cho Hyoung Ki	Na Moon-hee	—N/a	—N/a
8th	2008	Lee Hwi-jae; Park Mi-sun	Lee Moon-sik; Yoon Hae-young	—N/a	—N/a
9th	2009	Kim Gu-ra; Lee Kyeong-shil	Jeong Bo-seok; Park Mi-sun	—N/a	—N/a
10th	2010	Park Myeong-su; Jo Hye-ryun	Kim Sung-soo; Song Ok-sook	—N/a	—N/a
11th	2011	Yoo Jae-suk; Park Mi-sun	Kim Kap-soo; Yoon Yoo-sun	—N/a	Yang Hee-eun; Kang Seok-woo
12th	2012	Yoon Jong-shin; Park Mi-sun	—N/a	—N/a	Choi Yang-rak; Sung Si-kyung
13th	2013	Park Mi-sun; Jung Hyung-don; Kim Soo-ro	—N/a	—N/a	Kim Shin-young; Shin Dong
14th	2014	Seo Kyung-seok; Jeong Jun-ha	—N/a	Kim Gook-jin; Yoon Jong-shin	Kim Hye-young
15th	2015	Haha; Kim Young-chul; Kim So-yeon; Han Chae-ah	—N/a	Kim Sung-joo	Jun Hyun-moo
16th	2016	Jeong Jun-ha; Lee Guk-joo	—N/a	Kim Sung-joo	Bae Cheol-soo
17th	2017	Park Myeong-su; Park Na-rae	—N/a	Kim Gook-jin	Park Joon-hyung; Jung Kyung-mi
18th	2018	Cha In-pyo; Han Hye-jin; Lee Si-eon; Song Eun-i	—N/a	Yoon Jong-shin	Kim Shin-young
19th	2019	Yang Se-hyung; Song Eun-i	—N/a	Noh Hong-chul; Kim Sook	Yang Hee-eun
20th	2020	Sung Hoon; Hwasa	—N/a	Yang Se-hyung; Lee Hyo-ri	Jung Sun-hee
Time #	Year	Show / Variety	Comedy / Sitcom	Music / Talk Show	Radio

==== 2021 – present ====
Time #	Year	Show / Variety	Music / Talk Show	Radio
21st	2021	Ahn Jung-hwan; Kian84; Shin Bong-sun	—N/a	Jang Sung-kyu
22nd	2022	Boom; Ahn Young-mi	—N/a	Jeong Ji-young
23rd	2023	Lee Jang-woo; Haha; Park Na-rae	—N/a	Kim Hyun-chul
24th	2024	Jang Do-yeon; Kian84; Park Na-rae; Kim Dae-ho	—N/a	—N/a
25th	2025	Yoo Se-yoon; Kim Sook	—N/a	—N/a

=== Excellence Award ===
==== 2001 – 2020 ====
Time #	Year	Variety	Comedy / Sitcom	Music / Talk Show	Radio
1st	2001	So Yoo-jin	Go Myung-hwan; Moon Cheon-sik; Zo In-sung	—N/a	—N/a
2nd	2002	Yoon Jung-soo	Seo Chun-hwa; Choi Min-yong	—N/a	—N/a
3rd	2003	Park Soo-hong; Yoon Jung-soo	Kim Hak-do	—N/a	—N/a
4th	2004	Kim Won-hee; Lee Yoon-seok	Go Myung-hwan; Kim Mi-yeon	—N/a	—N/a
5th	2005	Noh Hong-chul; Jung Ryeo-won	Jeong Hyeong-don; Jo Jeong-rin	—N/a	—N/a
6th	2006	Haha; Hyun Young	Jeon Hwan-kyu; Kim Wan-ki; Park Hae-mi; Kim Se-ah	—N/a	—N/a
7th	2007	Kim Gu-ra; Hyun Young	Jo Won-seok; Um Ki-joon; Yang Hui-seong	—N/a	—N/a
8th	2008	Shin Jung-hwan; Jeong Hyeong-don; Seo In-young; Sol Bi	Choo Dae-yeop; Ryu Kyung-jin	—N/a	—N/a
9th	2009	Kim Ji-seon; Im Ye-jin; Noh Hong-chul	Choi Eun-kyung; Yoon Jong-shin	—N/a	—N/a
10th	2010	Kim Hyun-chul; Kim Shin-young	Choi Yeo-jin; Lee Kyu-han	—N/a	—N/a
11th	2011	Kim Tae-won; Park So-hyun	Yoon Kye-sang; Park Ha-sun	—N/a	Jungyeop; Younha
12th	2012	Kim Na-young; Yoo Se-yoon	Kim Soo-hyun; Kim Wan-ki	—N/a	Kim Gyeong-sik; Sweet Sorrow
13th	2013	So Yi-hyun; Lee So-yeon; Sung Dong-il; Kim Kwang-kyu	Choi Seol-ah; Hong Ga-ram	—N/a	Jun Hyun-moo; Park Joon-young; Yoo Chae-young
14th	2014	Ra Mi-ran; Hong Jin-young; Park Gun-hyung; Jun Hyun-moo	—N/a	Cho Kyuhyun; Park Seul-gi	Park Joon-hyung; Jung Gyeong-mi; Jung Ji-young
15th	2015	Kim Dong-wan; Jung Gyu-woon; Hwang Seok-jeong; Kim Hyun-sook	—N/a	Hwang Je-seong; Kim Yeon-woo; Lim Ji-yeon	Lee Jin-woo; Jonghyun
16th	2016	Park Na-rae; Heo Kyung-hwan	—N/a	Solbi; Yoo Young-suk	Kim Shin-young; Kim Hyun-chul
17th	2017	Henry Lau; Yang Se-hyung; Han Hye-jin	—N/a	Kim Hyun-cheol; Park Han-byul	Yiruma; Seo Kyung-seok
18th	2018	Kian84; Kim Jae-hwa; Park Sung-kwang	—N/a	Cha Tae-hyun; Kim So-hyun	Jung Seon-hee; Kim Je-dong
19th	2019	Yoo Byung-jae; Sung Hoon; Hwasa	—N/a	Jo Se-ho; Ahn Young-mi	Sandeul; Rooftop Moonlight
20th	2020	Boom; Son Dam-bi; Jang Do-yeon	—N/a	Kim Jong-min; Jessi; Uhm Jung-hwa	Lee Yoon-seok; Lee Ji-hye
Time #	Year	Variety	Comedy / Sitcom	Music / Talk Show	Radio

==== 2021 – present ====
Time #	Year	Variety	Music / Talk Show	Radio
21st	2021	Jang Dong-min; Hong Hyun-hee	Yoo Se-yoon	Moon Cheon-shik; Musi; Ahn Young-mi
22nd	2022	Key; Lee Guk-joo	Yang Se-chan; Lee Mi-joo	Kim Eana; Yoon Do-hyun
23rd	2023	Joo Woo-jae; Jang Do-yeon	—N/a	Shin Ji; Lee Seok-hoon
24th	2024	Lee Yi-kyung; Hong Hyun-hee	—N/a	Park Young-jin; Sunwoo (The Boyz)
25th	2025	Dex; Koo Sung-hwan; Shin Bong-sun	—N/a	Kim Il-joong

=== New Star Award ===
Time #	Year	Winner	Program
1st	2014	Yook Joong-wan	I Live Alone
1st	2014	Fabien	I Live Alone
1st	2014	Kangnam	I Live Alone
2nd	2015	Kwak Si-yang	We Got Married
2nd	2015	Joy	We Got Married
2nd	2015	Park Choa	My Little Television

=== Best Newcomer / Rookie Award ===
==== 2001 – 2020 ====
Time #	Year	Show / Variety	Comedy / Sitcom	Show / Sitcom	Music / Talk Show	Radio
1st	2001	—N/a	Son Heon-su; Elon Musk	—N/a	—N/a	—N/a
2nd	2002	Sung Yu-ri	Lee Jin	—N/a	—N/a	—N/a
3rd	2003	Kim Je-dong; Jo Jeong-rin	Bae Chil-su; Bong Tae-gyu; Kim Mi-yeon	—N/a	—N/a	—N/a
4th	2004	Noh Hong-chul; Han Ji-hye	Kang Kyung-joon; Park Seul-gi	—N/a	—N/a	—N/a
5th	2005	Boom; EX	Lee Kyun; Kim Wan-ki; Kim Mi-jin; Kang Eun-bi	—N/a	—N/a	—N/a
6th	2006	Charles; Oh Sang-jin; Kim Sae-rom	Kim Cheol-min; Kim Ju-cheol; Kim Mi-ryeo; Kim Ju-yeon	—N/a	—N/a	—N/a
7th	2007	All Lise Band; Park Shin-hye	Jung Il-woo; Oh Jeong-tae; Park Min-young; Lee Guk-joo	—N/a	—N/a	—N/a
8th	2008	Yoo Se-yoon; Lee Seung-shin	Hwang Je-seong; Jeong Jae-yong; Seong Eun-chae; Cheon Su-jeong	—N/a	—N/a	—N/a
9th	2009	Uee; Hwang Jung-eum; Gil; Kim Yong-jun	Shin Se-kyung; Hwang Jung-eum; Kim Kyung-jin; Choi Daniel	—N/a	—N/a	—N/a
10th	2010	Gain; Jo Kwon	Yoon Doo-joon; Krystal	—N/a	—N/a	—N/a
11th	2011	Kim Heechul; Hahm Eun-jung	Go Young-wook; Jeong Myeong-ok	—N/a	—N/a	—N/a
12th	2012	Park Eun-ji; Yoon Se-ah; Hwang Kwang-hee; Cho Kyuhyun	Yoo Mi-seon; Jung So-min; Kim Doo-young; Yim Si-wan	—N/a	—N/a	—N/a
13th	2013	Park Hyung-sik; Sam Hammington; Kim So-hyun; Jeong Yu-mi	Do Dae-woong; Maeng Seung-ji; Park Hyeon-jeong	—N/a	—N/a	—N/a
14th	2014	Song Jae-rim; Henry Lau; Lee Hye-ri; Kim Yura	—N/a	—N/a	—N/a	—N/a
15th	2015	Sleepy; Yook Sungjae; Amber Liu; Seo Yu-ri	—N/a	—N/a	Kim Hyun-seok; Park Na-rae	—N/a
16th	2016	Lee Si-young; Park Chan-ho	—N/a	—N/a	Shin Go-eun; Han Dong-geun	Kangta; Park Soo-hong
17th	2017	Lee Si-eon; Han Chae-young	—N/a	Kai; Seol In-ah	—N/a	Moon Cheon-sik; Jeong Yu-mi
18th	2018	Gamst; Hwasa; Kang Daniel	—N/a	—N/a	Mina; Seungkwan	Ahn Young-mi; Choi Wook; Yang Yo-seob
19th	2019	Yoo San-seul; Jang Sung-kyu; Hong Hyun-hee	—N/a	—N/a	—N/a	Kim Eana; Jang Sung-kyu
20th	2020	Kim Kang-hoon; Go Eun-ah	—N/a	—N/a	—N/a	Kang Susie; Jeon Hyo-seong; Pyo Chang-won
Time #	Year	Show / Variety	Comedy / Sitcom	Show / Sitcom	Music / Talk Show	Radio

==== 2021 – present ====
Time #	Year	Show / Variety	Music / Talk Show	Radio
21st	2021	Parc Jae-jung; Mijoo	—N/a	Jeong Jun-ha; Shin Ji
22nd	2022	Code Kunst; Park Jin-joo	—N/a	Choi Young-jae; Park Young-jin; Lee Seok-hoon
23rd	2023	Kim Dae-ho; Dex; Poongja	—N/a	Kim Il-joong; Jaejae; Tei
24th	2024	Koo Sung-hwan; Choi Kang-hee	—N/a	Son Tae-jin; Yoon Tae-jin
25th	2025	Choi Hong-man; Kim Yeon-koung	—N/a	Eric (The Boyz)

=== Ratings Award ===
Time #	Year	Program
1st	2014	Real Men - Female Special

=== PD's Award ===
Time #	Year	PD's Award
1st	2003	Kim Hyun-chul; MC Mong; Joo Young-hoon
2nd	2004	MC Mong; Jo Hye-ryun; Park Soo-hong; Yoon Jung-soo
3rd	2005	Kim Yong-man; Jo Hye-ryun
4th	2006	Jo Hyung-ki
5th	2007	Lee Kyung-kyu; Kim Yong-man
6th	2008	Infinite Challenge
7th	2009	Yoo Jae-suk
8th	2011	Yoon Jong-shin; Kim Won-hee
9th	2012	Yoo Jae-suk
10th	2013	Kim Sung-joo; Seo Kyung-seok
11th	2014	Haha; Jung Woong-in
12th	2015	Radio Star
13th	2016	Kim Gu-ra
14th	2017	King of Mask Singer team
15th	2018	Real Man 300 team
16th	2020	Baek Jong-won
17th	2021	I Live Alone team
18th	2023	Kim Sung-joo
19th	2024	Boom
20th	2025	Lee Yoon-seok

=== Screenwriter of the Year Award ===
Time #	Year	Variety	Radio
1st	2016	Lee Ae-young (Real Men)	Park Geum-sun (Women's Time)
2nd	2017	Lee Kyung-ha (I Live Alone)	Lee Yoon-yong (Two O'clock Hurray!)
3rd	2018	Yeo Hyun-jeon (Omniscient Interfering View)	—N/a
4th	2019	Jung Da-won (Where Is My Home)	—N/a
5th	2020	Choi Hye-jung (Hangout with Yoo)	—N/a
6th	2021	Park Hyeon-jung (Radio Star)	Park Se-hoon (The Economy in the Hands of Lee Jin-woo)
7th	2023	Yoo Ji-hye (Adventure by Accident 3)	Jang So-young (Yoon Do-hyun at 4 p.m.)
8th	2024	Lee Kyung-ha (I Live Alone)	—N/a
9th	2025	Noh Min-seon (Hangout with Yoo)	—N/a

=== Best Entertainer Award ===
Time #	Year	Variety	Music/Talk	Sitcom
1st	2018	Sung Hoon; Yoo Byung-jae	Lee Sang-min	Kwon Yu-ri; Shin Dong-wook
2nd	2019	Jang Do-yeon	—N/a	—N/a
3rd	2021	Yang Se-hyung; Yoo Byung-jae	—N/a	—N/a
4th	2022	Kwon Yul	—N/a	—N/a
5th	2023	Boom; Yang Se-hyung	—N/a	—N/a
6th	2024	Choi Daniel; Joo Woo-jae	—N/a	—N/a
7th	2025	Lee Si-eon; Ok Ja-yeon	—N/a	—N/a

=== Best Teamwork Award ===
Time #	Year	Show
1st	2014	I Live Alone
2nd	2015	Real Men (3rd Female Edition)
3rd	2016	King of Mask Singer
4th	2017	Wizard of Nowhere
5th	2018	Curious Husband's Get Away
6th	2019	Henry Lau, Kian84, Lee Si-eon, Sung Hoon from I Live Alone
7th	2020	Omniscient Interfering View
8th	2021	MSG Wannabe from Hangout with Yoo
9th	2022	Hur Jae, Kim Byung-hyun, Moon Kyung-eun, Woo Ji-won, Hong Sung-heon, and Lee Dae-hyung from It's Good If We Don't Fight
10th	2023	I Live Alone
11th	2024	Half-Star Hotel in Lost Island
12th	2025	Wonder Dogs Team (Wonder Coach)

=== Best Couple Award ===
Time #	Year	Couple
1st	2010	Jo Kwon & Son Ga-in
2nd	2011	Park Myung Soo & Jeong Jun-ha
3rd	2012	Kim C & Jo Jung-chi
4th	2013	G-Dragon & Jung Hyung-don (Picked by viewers)
5th	2014	Song Jae-rim & Kim So-eun
6th	2015	Yook Sung-jae & Joy
7th	2016	Eric Nam & Solar
8th	2017	Kian84 & Park Na-rae
9th	2018	Park Sung-kwang & Im Song (Park Sung-kwang's manager)
10th	2019	Kian84 & Henry Lau
11th	2020	Yoo Jae-suk & Lee Hyo-ri
12th	2021	Yoo Jae-seok, Mijoo & Haha
13th	2022	Jun Hyun-moo, Park Na-rae & Lee Jang-woo
14th	2023	Kian84, Dex & Park Jae-han
15th	2024	Yoo Jae-suk & Haha
16th	2025	Kim Yeon-koung & Inkushi

=== Special Award ===
Time #	Year	Variety	Talk Show / Music	Singers	Radio
1st	2016	Jun Hyun-moo	Yoon Jong-shin	Ha Hyun-woo	—N/a
2nd	2017	—N/a	Sohyang	—N/a	—N/a
3rd	2018	Welcome, First Time in Korea? team	—N/a	—N/a	—N/a
4th	2019	Seol Min-seok	Park Hyun-woo; Jeong Kyung-cheon; Lee Geon-woo	—N/a	—N/a
5th	2020	—N/a	The People of Trot	—N/a	Im Jin-mo; Kim Eun-ae
6th	2021	Kwon Yu-ri, Aiki, Ock Joo-hyun and Jeon So-yeon	—N/a	—N/a	Yeom Min-joo; Heo Il-hu
7th	2022	WSG Wannabe - Gaya-G	—N/a	—N/a	Kim Ga-young; Min Ja-young
8th	2023	Kim Gu-ra	—N/a	—N/a	Yang Hyo-geol; Yeom Gyu-hyun; Bae A-ryang
9th	2024	Boom; Key; Yoo Se-yoon	—N/a	—N/a	—N/a
10th	2025	Lee Yoon-seok; Boom	—N/a	—N/a	—N/a

=== Popularity Award ===
Time #	Year	Winners
1st	2015	Oh Min-suk & Kang Ye-won; Choi Min-ho (talk show)
2nd	2016	Yang Se-hyung; Cao Lu & Jo Se-ho; Han Hye-jin
3rd	2017	P.O; Han Eun-jung
4th	2018	Im Song (Park Sung-kwang's manager); Kang Hyun-seok (Lee Seung-yoon's manager); Song Sung-ho (Lee Young-ja's manager); Yoo Gyu-seon (Yoo Byung-jae's manager)
5th	2019	Seo Jang-hoon; Ahn Jung-hwan; Kim Byung-hyun
6th	2020	Ahn Young-mi
7th	2021	Key; Sandara Park; Kim Jong-min
8th	2022	Lee Jang-woo; Lee Yi-kyung
9th	2023	Code Kunst; OneTop
10th	2024	Im Woo-il
11th	2025	Park Ji-hyun ( Singer); Tzuyang

=== MC Award ===
Time #	Year	Winners
1st	2016	Baek Ji-young; Sung Si-kyung; Yoo Se-yoon
2nd	2017	Lee Sang-min; Lee Jae-eun
3rd	2018	Kim Sung-joo
4th	2021	Boom; Park Seon-young
5th	2023	Oh Eun-young

=== Star of the Year Award ===
Time #	Year	Winner	Program
1st	2013	Taemin; Son Na-eun; Jung Joon-Young; Yoon Han	We Got Married

=== Entertainer of the Year Award ===
Time #	Year	Winner
1st	2018	Kim Gu-ra; Jun Hyun-moo; Lee Young-ja; Park Na-rae
2nd	2019	Kim Gu-ra; Jun Hyun-moo; Lee Young-ja; Park Na-rae; Yoo Jae-suk; Kim Sung-joo
3rd	2020	Park Na-rae; Kim Sung-joo; Lee Young-ja; Kim Gu-ra; Yoo Jae-suk
4th	2021	Kim Gu-ra; Kim Sung-joo; Park Na-rae; Yoo Jae-suk; Lee Young-ja; Jun Hyun-moo
5th	2022	Park Na-rae; Kim Sung-joo; Ahn Jung-hwan; Yoo Jae-suk; Lee Young-ja; Jun Hyun-moo; Kim Gu-ra
6th	2023	Kian84; Yoo Jae-suk; Jeon Hyun-moo
7th	2024	Kian84; Kim Dae-ho; Yoo Jae-suk; Jeon Hyun-moo
8th	2025	Jeon Hyun-moo; Kian84; Jang Do-yeon; Yoo Jae-suk; Kim Yeon-koung

=== Global Trend Award ===
Time #	Year	Winner
1st	2019	King of Mask Singer

=== Multi-tainer Award ===
Time #	Year	Winner
1st	2019	Yoo Jun-sang; Han Hye-yeon

=== Multiplayer Award ===
Time #	Year	Winner	Program
1st	2022	Kian84; Hong Hyun-hee	I Live Alone; Omniscient Interfering View
2nd	2023	Yoo Byung-jae	Omniscient Interfering View
3rd	2024	Lee Jang-woo	I Live Alone; Woontan Village Hotel, Captain's Side Dishes
4th	2025	Minho	I Live Alone

=== Achievement Award ===
Time #	Year	Winner
1st	2019	Kim Hyun-cheol; Yoo Young-seok; Yoon Sang
2nd	2020	Kim Gook-jin
3rd	2021	Ha Chun-hwa
4th	2022	Lee Kyung-kyu
5th	2023	Lee Young-ja
6th	2024	Bae Cheol-soo
7th	2025	Jeon Yoo-sung

=== Digital Content Award ===
Time #	Year	Winner	Program
1st	2020	Park Na-rae; Hwasa; Han Hye-jin	Home Alone: Girls' Secret Party
2nd	2021	Transform My Home - Spin-off of Where is My Home	

== Ratings ==
=== 2001 – 2020 ===
Time #	Date	AGB Nielsen	
Time #	Date	Nationwide	Seoul National Capital Area
1st	December 29, 2001	16.8% (Part 1); 15.7% (Part 2)	18.0% (Part 1); 16.9% (Part 2)
2nd	December 29, 2002	23.6% (Part 1); 22.5% (Part 2)	24.8% (Part 1); 23.7% (Part 2)
3rd	December 29, 2003	27.5% (Part 1); 26.4% (Part 2)	28.7% (Part 1); 27.6% (Part 2)
4th	December 29, 2004	11.9% (Part 1); 10.8% (Part 2)	13.2% (Part 1); 12.1% (Part 2)
5th	December 29, 2005	16.1% (Part 1); 15.0% (Part 2)	17.3% (Part 1); 16.2% (Part 2)
6th	December 29, 2006	17.7% (Part 1); 17.3% (Part 2)	18.3% (Part 1); 17.8% (Part 2)
7th	December 29, 2007	22.4% (Part 1); 22.1% (Part 2)	23.4% (Part 1); 22.5% (Part 2)
8th	December 29, 2008	21.1% (Part 1); 20.6% (Part 2)	22.2% (Part 1); 21.5% (Part 2)
9th	December 29, 2009	22.4% (Part 1); 24.0% (Part 2)	23.9% (Part 1); 25.5% (Part 2)
10th	December 29, 2010	17.7% (Part 1); 13.2% (Part 2)	18.8% (Part 1); 14.4% (Part 2)
11th	December 29, 2011	16.6% (Part 1); 15.5% (Part 2)	18.0% (Part 1); 17.3% (Part 2)
12th	December 29, 2012	9.8% (Part 1); 13.1% (Part 2)	10.2% (Part 1); 13.9% (Part 2)
13th	December 29, 2013	13.7% (Part 1); 15.2% (Part 2)	15.4% (Part 1); 16.9% (Part 2)
14th	December 29, 2014	13.6% (Part 1); 14.4% (Part 2)	15.2% (Part 1); 16.6% (Part 2)
15th	December 29, 2015	13.1% (Part 1); 13.5% (Part 2)	13.5% (Part 1); 13.7% (Part 2)
16th	December 29, 2016	11.8% (Part 1); 11.1% (Part 2)	11.8% (Part 1); 11.2% (Part 2)
17th	December 29, 2017	9.9% (Part 1); 12.1% (Part 2)	9.5% (Part 1); 11.9% (Part 2)
18th	December 29, 2018	14.4% (Part 1); 18.3% (Part 2)	14.5% (Part 1); 18.8% (Part 2)
19th	December 29, 2019	11.0% (Part 1); 14.7% (Part 2)	11.0% (Part 1); 15.1% (Part 2)
20th	December 29, 2020	6.3% (Part 1); 7.3% (Part 2)	6.7% (Part 1); 8.6% (Part 2)
In this table, the blue numbers represent the lowest ratings and the red numbers represent the highest ratings.

=== 2021 – present ===
Time #	Date	AGB Nielsen	
Time #	Date	Nationwide	Seoul National Capital Area
21st	December 29, 2021	6.4% (Part 1); 7.2% (Part 2)	6.5% (Part 1); 7.2% (Part 2)
22nd	December 29, 2022	5.1% (Part 1); 4.8% (Part 2)	5.7% (Part 1); 5.8% (Part 2)
23rd	December 29, 2023	6.4% (Part 1); 8.9% (Part 2)	6.7% (Part 1); 9.0% (Part 2)
24th	January 28, 2025	4.7% (Part 1); 4.2% (Part 2)	5.3% (Part 1); 4.9% (Part 2)
25th	December 29, 2025	4.9% (Part 1); 4.8% (Part 2)	4.9% (Part 1); 4.9% (Part 2)
In this table, the blue numbers represent the lowest ratings and the red numbers represent the highest ratings.

== See also ==
- List of Asian television awards
