= Noh Hong-chul =

South Korean entertainer (born 1979)

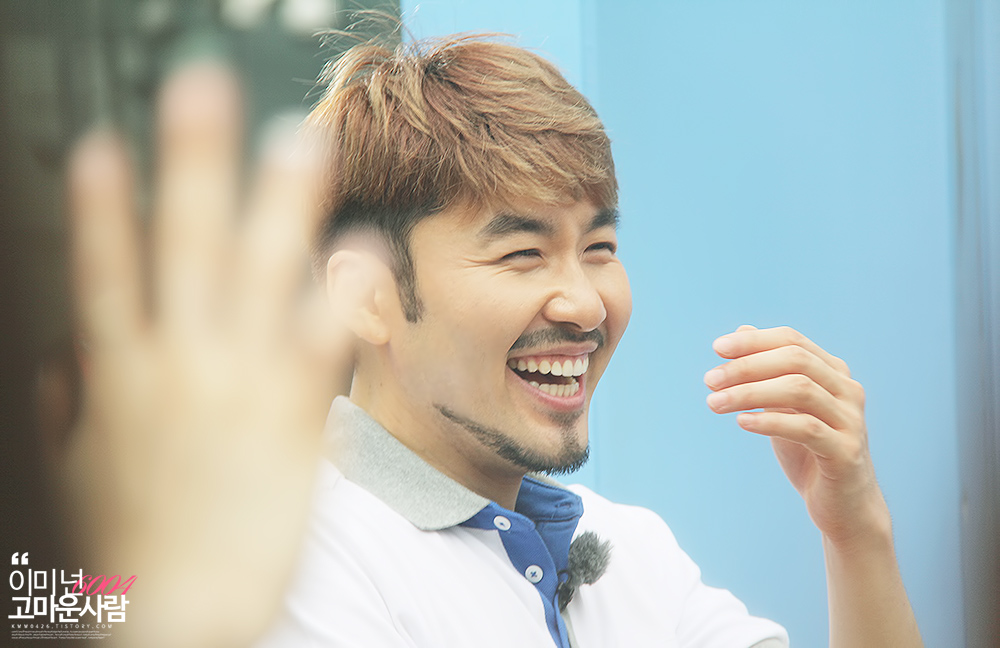
- Noh during the Infinite Challenge on 7 August 2014
- Born: March 31, 1979 (age 47); Apgujeong-dong, Gangnam District, Seoul, South Korea
- Education: Hongik University
- Agent: FNC Entertainment
- Notable work: Infinite Challenge; I Live Alone

Comedy career
- Years active: 2004–present
- Medium: Stand-up, television
- Genres: Comedy, entertainment

Korean name
- Hangul: 노홍철
- RR: No Hongcheol
- MR: No Hongch'ŏl

Noh Hong-chul (Korean: 노홍철; born 31 March 1979) is a South Korean entertainer and entrepreneur. He is the co-host of the variety show Talents for Sale. He previously appeared on the television programs Infinite Challenge and I Live Alone. He had a cameo in the popular music video "Gangnam Style" which featured his trademark pelvic thrusting jeojil dance (저질댄스).

== Career ==
Psy and Noh in the elevator scene in the music video of "Gangnam Style".

=== Pre-debut ===
Noh Hong-chul studied mechanical engineering at the Hongik University. After finishing his mandatory two-year military service, he created the online fashion malls Nohongchul.com and Dream and Adventurous Hongchul-Land Corporation which sell a range of party supplies. Noh also ran Hongchul Tour which provided budget trip services in China; he sometimes personally guided his customers during these trips.

=== 2004–present ===
Noh's television debut came on Mnet in early 2004 when he hosted the cable TV show Dr. No's Pleasure Street (닥터 노의 KIN길거리). After the success of the show, he joined the free-to-air MBC program Come to Play (놀러와) as a joint panelist. In April 2005, he became a founding member of variety show Infinite Challenge.

He was featured in a commercial for the GM Daewoo Matiz. The ad showed caricatures and photos of him inserted into the hood (bonnet) and doors of his red Matiz car (nicknamed Hong car 홍카, a play on his name and the word hong which means red).

Noh had a brief cameo in Psy's music video "Gangnam Style". He was shown thrusting his pelvis in his trademark lewd dance or jeojil dance (저질댄스) while standing above Psy rapping in an elevator. His seven-second appearance in the video became a worldwide "sensation within a sensation" and he was, separately from Psy, invited to appear on US television.

He made an appearance in Psy's video "Gentleman" alongside the rest of the Infinite Challenge members; and in Sistar's music video, "Touch My Body" alongside Jung Jun-mo.

On July 16, 2026, Noh shared plans on social media to create a hotel — or possibly a small capsule hotel or hostel — built around the concept of "predictable eccentricity." The announcement drew added attention as it came shortly after he had disclosed an uncomfortable experience during a trip to the United Kingdom, where he was refused a refund after the air conditioning at his hotel malfunctioned during a heatwave.

== Personal life ==
=== Drunk driving incident ===
On November 8, 2014, Noh was arrested for drunk driving. He later issued an apology and withdrew from the television programs he was participating in, including Infinite Challenge and I Live Alone.

== Filmography ==
=== Current programs ===
| Year | Title | Role | Notes/Ref. |
|---|---|---|---|
| 2019–present | Where Is My Home | Co-host | The program premiered on March 31, 2019. |
| 2019–present | Shopping Cart Savior | Cast | The program premiered on May 23, 2019. |
| 2022 | Blockbuster: The Brick Wars of Geniuses | Host | |
| 2022 | Other World Used Cars-Gear GODs | Host | |
| 2023 | Earth Magic Bull World Travel | Guide | |
| 2023 | For the First Time in Our Lives | Cast Member | |

=== Web shows ===
| Year | Title | Role | Notes | Ref. |
|---|---|---|---|---|
| 2021 | The Hungry and The Hairy | Cast Member | with Rain | |
| 2022 | Spectator +: Short Buster | Host | | |
| 2022 | Sleep | Host | | |
| 2023 | Zombie Verse | Cast Member | | |

=== Former programs ===
- Mnet KIN streets of Dr. No – VJ
- Mnet Super Vibe Party – fixed cast
- MBC Rainbow Romance
- MBC Sunday Sunday Night – fixed panel
- MBC Best Saturday – fixed panel
- MBC Sunday Phone Get Star Wars – co-MC
- KBS 1 lesson Republic of Korea – fixed panel
- MBC Mysterious TV Surprise – co-MC
- Mnet Campus Corner Dance – co-MC
- MBC 7 Octaves – fixed panel
- KBS Happy Sunday – "Kwaenam Age" – fixed panel
- KBS Happy Sunday – "Power attendance! Let's go to school" – co-MC
- KBS Happy Sunday – "I'm ready." – co-MC
- KBS Happy Sunday – "1 Night 2 Days" – co-MC
- SBS Good Sunday – "Change" – co-MC
- SBS it! No? – co-MC
- MBC Yoo Jae-seok & Kim Won-hee's Come to Play – fixed panel
- Mnet Phil Trend Report Season 4 – MC
- SBS Good Sunday – "Gold Miss is Coming" – co-MC
- KBS Imaginary Confrontation – co-MC
- MBC Fox's Butler – fixed panel
- KBS Escape Crisis No. 1 – co-MC
- SBS Good Sunday – "Hero hogeol" – co-MC
- tvN Korea's Got Talent – co-MC
- tvN Becoming a Billionaire – co-MC
- mbn Star byte – MC
- M.net Serenade Battle – MC
- OnStyle Hello! Russia – story
- Korean TV Choehyeonwoo, Magic Hall of GNP – co-MC
- MBC God of the Game – co-MC
- MBC I'm a Singer – Season 2 – co-MC
- tvN Find the Fake? A keen eye – co-MC
- KBS Talk show, slapping – co-MC
- KBS W All That's GNP living – MC
- MBC MBC Special Documentary – Seoul to Savor – story
- tvN The Genius: Rule Breaker
- KBS Yihyeokjae, riding in the GNP – co-MC
- MBC Thank you – co-MC
- MBC The Lord of the study – co-MC
- MBC Sweet Girl MC
- MBC Hidden operation stage winner – co-MC
- MBC When I was the man to be alone – MC
- MBC Folks in my soul – co-MC
- KBS I am the man – co-MC
- MBC Love Notice – co-MC
- MBC Infinite Challenge (무한도전) – co-host, founding member, (2005–2014)
- tvN Of the Birth Rich Person (부자의 탄생) – co-host
- M.net Serenade Operations (세레나데 대작전) – co-host
- MBC Come to play' (놀러와) – joint panel (2004–2010)
- MBC 7 Octaves (7옥타브) – joint panel
- MBC The lord of Study (공부의 신, special coverage for 2007 Hangawi holidays) – co-host
- KBS 2TV Happy Sunday – 2 Days & 1 Night (해피 선데이 - 1박2일) – joint panel
- SBS Power FM's Noh Hong-cheol's Happy Our Young Day – host (노홍철의 기쁜 우리 젊은날, May 1 – November 6, 2006)
- SBS Gold-miss is coming (골드미스가 간다) – host-in-chief
- M.net Trend Report Fil (트렌드리포트 필, latest fashion trend magazine) – host
- SBS Heroes – host
- KBS 2TV Emergency Escape Number One! (위기탈출 넘버원!) – co-host
- tvN Korea's Got Talent (코리아 갓 탤런트) – co-host
- KBS 2TV Do Dream – co-host
- MBC I Live Alone (나 혼자 산다) – host-in-chief (episodes 1–79)
- MBC Show! Music Core – co-host (April 2013 – June 28, 2014)
- KBS 2TV Talents for Sale (어서옵SHOW) – co-host (May 6 – October 7, 2016)
- JTBC Mix Nine (믹스나인) – host (October 29, 2017 – January 26, 2018)
- MBC The Hungry - co-host (December 7, 2018 – March 15, 2019)
- SBS Circle House - co-host (24 February – 28 April 2022)

=== Film ===
| Year | Title | Role | Note | Ref. |
|---|---|---|---|---|
| 2005 | Hoodwinked | Sandy jjiksa | Korean dubbed version | |
| 2006 | Who Slept With Her | DJ | | |
| 2011 | Hoodwinked Too! Hood VS. Evil | Sandy jjiksa | Korean dubbed version | |
| 2011 | The Jungle Bunch-Back to the Ice Floe | Morristown | Korean dubbed version | |
| 2012 | Zambezia | Kestrel | Korean dubbed version | |

=== Radio ===
| Year | Title | Station | Role | Ref. |
|---|---|---|---|---|
| 2006 | Noh Hong-chul's Joyful Days of Our Youth | SBS Love FM | DJ | |
| 2010–2011 | Noh Hong-chul's Good Friend | MBC FM4U | DJ | |
| 2016–2017 | Good Morning FM I'm Noh Hong-chul | MBC FM4U | DJ | |

== Awards and nominations ==
| Awards show | Year | Category | Nominated work | Result | Ref. |
|---|---|---|---|---|---|
| Asia Model Festival Awards | 2010 | Fashionista Award | | Won | |
| Asian Academy Creative Awards | 2022 | Best Entertainment Host | Blockbuster | Nominated | |
| Korea Best Dresser Awards | 2006 | Comedy Category | | Won | |
| Korea Entertainment Arts Awards | 2014 | TV Host Award | | Won | |
| MBC Drama Awards | 2010 | Best Newcomer in Radio | Noh Hong-chul's Good Friend | Won | |
| MBC Entertainment Awards | 2004 | Best Newcomer in Variety Category | Come to Play | Won | |
| MBC Entertainment Awards | 2005 | Excellence Award in Variety Category | | Won | |
| MBC Entertainment Awards | 2007 | Grand Prize | Infinite Challenge (Shared with Infinite Challenge cast) | Won | |
| MBC Entertainment Awards | 2009 | Excellence Award in Variety Category | Infinite Challenge; Come to Play | Won | |
| MBC Entertainment Awards | 2013 | Popularity Award in Variety Category | Infinite Challenge | Won | |
| MBC Entertainment Awards | 2019 | Top Excellence Award in Music/Talk Show Category | Where Is My Home; Funding Together | Won | |
| Mnet 20's Choice Awards | 2007 | Individuality Award | | Won | |
| SBS Entertainment Awards | 2008 | Experimental Spirit Award | Itda! Eopda? (있다! 없다?) (Shared with Ji Sang-ryeol and Song Eun-i) | Won | |
