= Kim Young-hee (comedian) =

South Korean entertainer (born 1983)

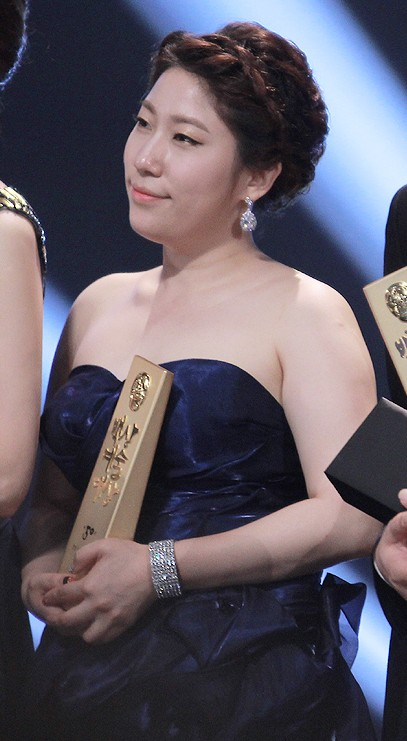
- Kim in 2014
- Born: August 23, 1983 (age 43); Daegu, South Korea
- Spouse: Yoon Seung-yeol (m. 2021)
- Children: 1

Comedy career
- Years active: 2009–present
- Medium: Stand-up, television
- Genres: Observational, Sketch, Wit, Parody, Slapstick, Dramatic, Sitcom
- Musical career
- Genres: K-pop; Dance; Entertainer
- Instrument: Vocals
- Years active: 2018

Korean name
- Hangul: 김영희
- Hanja: 金英熙
- RR: Gim Yeonghui
- MR: Kim Yŏnghŭi

Kim Young-hee (Korean: 김영희; born August 23, 1983) is a South Korean comedian, managed under the entertainment agency A9 Media. She gained notoriety in 2010 with her role in the Gag Concert skit "Two Minute Debate", and won the best new female comedian award at that year's KBS Entertainment Awards. Kim was a former member of Celeb Five (Korean: 셀럽파이브), a dance group formed by Kim Shin-young and produced by CONTENTS LAB VIVO, a contents company owned by Song Eun-i.

== Personal life ==
On February 24, 2022, Kim announced that she was pregnant with her first child. On September 8, she gave birth to her first daughter.

== Filmography ==
=== Film ===
- Love with the Singularity (Biflix Film, 2022) – Director

=== Variety shows ===
Year	Show	Role	Notes/Ref.
2010–2015	Gag Concert	Cast member	
2011	Two Men's Suspicious Show	Panelist	Single broadcast show
2013	Rollercoaster	Cast member	Season 3
2013–2014	The Human Condition	Cast member	Comedienne Specials^{a}
2016–present	Comedy Big League	Cast member	
2017–present	Dongchimi	Panelist	
2022	Dog-Daughter-in-law	Cast Member	

^a: Kim appeared in the majority of episodes, although she was not present in certain episodes such as the episode, Living Without Chemicals.

=== Theatre ===
Year	Title	Role	Venue	Notes/Ref.
2015	Drip Girls	Herself	Shinhan Card Art Hall	Season 4
2015	Drip Girls	Herself	Hyundai Arts Centre	Season 4
2016	Drip Girls	Herself	KT&G Sangsang Art Hall	Season 5
2017	Miss Gag Korea	Herself	Kalkal Hall	
2017	Miss Gag Korea	Herself	Busan International Comedy Festival	
2017	Drip Girls	Herself	Uniplex Hall 1	Season 6
2017	Drip Girls	Herself	Samsung Cultural Center	Season 6
2017	Drip Girls	Herself	Anyang Arts Center	Season 6
2018	Drip Girls	Herself	Uniplex Hall 1	Season 7
2018	Drip Girls	Herself	KBS Hall (Busan)	Season 7
2018	Drip Girls	Herself	Busan International Comedy Festival	Season 7
2018	Shop on the Stage	신데라	The Good Theater	

== Discography ==
=== Celeb Five ===
Year	Title	Album details	Peak chart positions	Sales	Album
Year	Title	Album details	KOR	Sales	Album
2018	"Celeb Five (I Wanna Be A Celeb)" (셀럽파이브(셀럽이 되고 싶어)	Released: January 24, 2018; Label: CONTENTS LAB VIVO, NHN Entertainment; Genre: Dance	—	—	Celeb No.1
"—" denotes releases that did not chart or were not released in that region.

== Awards and nominations ==
Year	Award	Category	Nominated work	Result
2010	KBS Entertainment Awards	Best Newcomer Award (Comedy)	Gag Concert	Won
2010	KBS Entertainment Awards	Top Excellence Award, Idea (Corner)	Double Debate (Gag Concert)	Won
2014	50th Baeksang Arts Awards	Best Variety Performer – Female	Gag Concert	Won
2014	KBS Entertainment Awards	Top Excellence Award (Comedy)	Gag Concert	Won
2025	KBS Entertainment Awards	Entertainer of the Year	Gag Concert	Won
