= Heroes (TV program) =

2010–2011 South Korean TV series

- Also known as: Good Sunday - Heroes
- Genre: Variety show Comedy
- Starring: Lee Hwi-jae; Noh Hong-chul; Noh Sa-yeon; Jeong Ga-eun; Lee Jin; Shin Bong-sun; Ka-hi; Narsha; Yoo In-na; Seo In-young; Hong Soo-ah; Nicole Jung; IU; Park Ji-yeon
- Country of origin: South Korea
- Original language: Korean
- No. of episodes: 40

Production
- Producers: Park Sung-hoon; Kim Yong-kwon
- Running time: 60-75 minutes per episode

Original release
- Network: SBS
- Release: July 18, 2010 – May 1, 2011

Related
- Good Sunday

Heroes (Korean: 영웅호걸; Hanja: 英雄豪傑) is a South Korean variety show; a part of SBS's Good Sunday lineup, along with Running Man. It is classified as a "popularity search variety", where the female celebrities compete to find out which of them is more popular among citizens. It was first aired on July 18, 2010, and ended on May 1, 2011, with a total of 40 episodes aired. Each week, the celebrities are divided into two equal groups of a "Popular" group and an "Unpopular" group (or "Not-So-Popular" group) and must complete certain missions every episode and whoever wins usually get a prize, such as the other team must make dinner for them, they get a hot shower and beds, etc.

== Cast ==
Hosts

- Lee Hwi-jae
- Noh Hong-chul

Main cast

- Noh Sa-yeon
- Jeong Ga-eun
- Lee Jin
- Shin Bong-sun
- Kahi
- Narsha
- Yoo In-na
- Seo In-young
- Hong Soo-ah
- Nicole Jung
- IU
- Park Ji-yeon

== Awards and nominations ==
Award	Year	Category	Recipient	Result	Ref.
SBS Entertainment Awards	2010	Best Teamwork Award	Main cast	Won	
SBS Entertainment Awards	2010	Best Newcomer	IU	Won	
SBS Entertainment Awards	2010	Best Newcomer	Kahi	Won	
SBS Entertainment Awards	2010	Netizens Most Popular Program	Heroes	Nominated	
SBS Entertainment Awards	2010	Netizens Highest Popularity Award	IU	Nominated	
SBS Entertainment Awards	2010	Netizens Highest Popularity Award	Yoo In-na	Nominated	
SBS Entertainment Awards	2010	Netizens Highest Popularity Award	Lee Hwi-jae	Nominated	
SBS Entertainment Awards	2010	Netizens Highest Popularity Award	Seo In-young	Nominated	
Bugs Music Awards	2010	Top Variety Star	Jiyeon	Nominated	
