= Long Live Independence =

South Korean reality show

- Promotional poster
- Hangul: 독립만세
- Hanja: 獨立萬歲
- RR: Dongnimmanse
- MR: Tongnimmanse
- Genre: Entertainment; Reality
- Directed by: Sung Chi-kyung; Chae Sung-wook; Kim Eun-ji; Yoo Soo-yeon; Jung Yoon-ah; Jo Young-ik; Min Sae-bom; Oh Tak-geun; Yang Jin-hee; Kim Tae-jung; Pi Da-eun; Joo Hyun-ho; Park Dae-hyun; Park Hyun-mi; Jung Ji-yoon
- Presented by: Kim Hee-chul; Boom
- Starring: Song Eun-i; Jaejae; AKMU; Kim Min-seok
- Country of origin: South Korea
- Original language: Korean
- No. of seasons: 1
- No. of episodes: 12

Original release
- Network: JTBC
- Release: February 22 – May 17, 2021

Long Live Independence (Korean: 독립만세) is a South Korean observation reality show program that shows celebrities who have never lived alone in their whole lives as they learn how to strike out on their own and live independently for the first time. The show will follow these celebrities throughout the whole process of living independently, including finding their own house themselves. The show aired on JTBC every Monday at 22:30 (KST) starting from February 22, 2021.

== Broadcast schedule ==
| Broadcast channel | Broadcast period | Airtime |
|---|---|---|
| JTBC | February 22, 2021 – March 22, 2021 | Every Monday 10:30 – 12:50 PM |
| JTBC | March 29, 2021 – May 27, 2021 | Every Monday 9:00 – 11:20 PM |

== MC ==
- Kim Hee-chul (Super Junior) (Ep.1 – 12)
- Boom (Ep.1 – 6)

== Cast ==
- Song Eun-i
- Jaejae
- AKMU
- Kim Min-seok

== List of Guests and Ratings ==
- Ratings listed below are the individual corner ratings of Long Live Independence. (Note: Individual corner ratings do not include commercial time, which regular ratings include.)
- In the ratings below, the highest rating for the show will be in red and the lowest rating for the show will be in blue each year.

| Ep. # | Original Airdate | Guests | Nielsen Korea Ratings Nationwide |
|---|---|---|---|
| 1 | February 22, 2021 | Jo Byeong-kyu | 2.927% |
| 2 | March 1, 2021 | Jo Byeong-kyu | 1.741% |
| 3 | March 8, 2021 | Lee Seung-yoon, Lee Mu-jin | 2.543% |
| 4 | March 22, 2021 | Kim Young-chul, Jung Sung-hwa, Song So-hee, DinDin | 2.308% |
| 5 | March 29, 2021 | Kim Sung-kyu, Go Eun-sung | 2.966% |
| 6 | April 5, 2021 | Kim Se-jeong, Sam Hammington | 3.361% |
| 7 | April 12, 2021 | Park Soo-hong, Kang Seung-yoon (Winner), Go Eun-sung, Xiumin (Exo), Jo Kwon | 3.503% |
| 8 | April 19, 2021 | Lee Bong-won | 2.884% |
| 9 | April 26, 2021 | Hwang Kwanghee, Kim Bo-ra, Kim Sae-ron | 3.141% |
| 10 | May 3, 2021 | Jung Jae-hyung | 3.325% |
| 11 | May 10, 2021 | Jun Hyun-moo, Celeb Five | 3.485% |
| 12 | May 17, 2021 | Celeb Five | 3.513% |
