= The Hit (South Korean TV series) =

Music Talk Show

- Promotional poster
- Hangul: 더 히트
- RR: Deo hiteu
- MR: Tŏ hit'ŭ
- Genre: Music; Talk Show
- Starring: Song Eun-i; Kim Shin-Young
- Country of origin: South Korea
- Original language: Korean
- No. of seasons: 1
- No. of episodes: 12 (list of episodes)

Production
- Production location: South Korea
- Running time: 80 minutes

Original release
- Network: KBS2
- Release: February 8 – April 19, 2019

The Hit (Korean: 더 히트) is a South Korean music program starring Song Eun-i and Kim Shin-Young as the MCs. The show aired on KBS2 from February 8 to April 19, 2019. It is distributed and syndicated by KBS every Friday at 20:00 (KST). The program also aired on KBS World with English subtitles.

== Synopsis ==
This is a music show where two different artists or groups come together to make a music shuffle that mashes up each of their hit songs that they selected to make it an even greater hit song. The groups which manage to hit 10K hearts from the audience before the performance ends are able to receive the "Golden Record Disc" on which they then sign. The "Golden Record Disc" is then displayed at the recording studio itself.

== Airdate ==
Air Date	Air Time	Notes
8/2/2019	20:00 – 00:20	It is aired as two episodes instead of one
15/2/2019 – 19/4/2019	20:00 – 23:20	—N/a

== Cast ==
Name	Episode	Notes
Song Eun-i	1 – 12	
Kim Shin-Young	1 – 12	

== List of Episodes ==
Ep. #	Air Date	Mash Ups	Golden Record
1	February 8, 2019	Kim Kyung-ho (Shout) and Norazo (Superman); Jang Hye-jin (One Late Night in 1994) and Wheesung (Heartsore Story); So Chan-whee (Tears) and Lovelyz (Ah-Choo)	Jang Hye-jin and Wheesung
2	February 8, 2019	Kim Kyung-ho (Shout) and Norazo (Superman); Jang Hye-jin (One Late Night in 1994) and Wheesung (Heartsore Story); So Chan-whee (Tears) and Lovelyz (Ah-Choo)	Jang Hye-jin and Wheesung
3	February 15, 2019	Hyun-sik and Jung Il-hoon (BtoB) (Missing You) and Eddy Kim (You are So Beautiful); Kim Jo-han (I Want To Fall in Love) and Chungha (Roller Coaster); Kim Yon-ja (Amor Fati) and Kim Kyung-ho (Forbidden Love)	Hyun-sik (BtoB), Jung Il-hoon (BtoB) and Eddy Kim; Kim Yon-ja and Kim Kyung-ho
4	February 22, 2019	Hyun-sik and Jung Il-hoon (BtoB) (Missing You) and Eddy Kim (You are So Beautiful); Kim Jo-han (I Want To Fall in Love) and Chungha (Roller Coaster); Kim Yon-ja (Amor Fati) and Kim Kyung-ho (Forbidden Love)	Hyun-sik (BtoB), Jung Il-hoon (BtoB) and Eddy Kim; Kim Yon-ja and Kim Kyung-ho
5	March 1, 2019	No Brain (You're Falling in to Me) and Lee Hyun-woo (슬픔 속에 그댈 지워야만 해); Noh Sa-yeon (만남) and GFriend (Time for the Moon Night); Kim Jo-han (A Match Made in Heaven) and Lee Hyun (Without a Heart)	No Brain and Lee Hyun-woo; Noh Sa-yeon and GFriend; Kim Jo-han and Lee Hyun
6	March 8, 2019	No Brain (You're Falling in to Me) and Lee Hyun-woo (슬픔 속에 그댈 지워야만 해); Noh Sa-yeon (만남) and GFriend (Time for the Moon Night); Kim Jo-han (A Match Made in Heaven) and Lee Hyun (Without a Heart)	No Brain and Lee Hyun-woo; Noh Sa-yeon and GFriend; Kim Jo-han and Lee Hyun
7	March 15, 2019	Chae Yeon (Two of Us) and Momoland (Bboom Bboom); Yurisangja (Pure and Pure Love) and Tei (Same Pillow); Wax (Fixing Makeup) and Chang-min (Can't Let You Go Even If I Die)	Wax and Chang-min
8	March 22, 2019	Chae Yeon (Two of Us) and Momoland (Bboom Bboom); Yurisangja (Pure and Pure Love) and Tei (Same Pillow); Wax (Fixing Makeup) and Chang-min (Can't Let You Go Even If I Die)	Wax and Chang-min
9	March 29, 2019	1st Round: Kan Mi-youn (Paparazzi) and Oh My Girl (Hyojung, Mimi, Seunghee, Jiho, Binnie and Arin) (Remember Me); Park Sang-min (My Love in Distant Memory) and Kim Jung-min (Last Promise)	Kan Mi-youn and Oh My Girl; Park Sang-min and Kim Jung-min; Kim Hyung-joong and Lee Seok-hoon
10	April 5, 2019	2nd Round: Kim Hyung-joong (Maybe) and Lee Seok-hoon (SG Wannabe) (Don't Love Me); Boom (The Boy Next Door) and Park Hyun-bin (Just Trust Me)	Kan Mi-youn and Oh My Girl; Park Sang-min and Kim Jung-min; Kim Hyung-joong and Lee Seok-hoon
11	April 12, 2019	1st Round: K.Will (Please Don't) and Wheesung (Even thought of Marriage); Jung-in (Rainy Season) and Mamamoo (Starry Night)	V.O.S and Na Yoon-kwon; Hong Kyung-min and Koyote
12	April 19, 2019	2nd Round: V.O.S (Look into the Eyes) and Na Yoon-kwon (Her Back); Hong Kyung-min (Shaky Friendship) and Koyote (Genuine)	V.O.S and Na Yoon-kwon; Hong Kyung-min and Koyote

== Ratings ==
- Ratings listed below are the individual corner ratings of The Hit. (Note: Individual corner ratings do not include commercial time, which regular ratings include.)
- In the ratings below, the highest rating for the show will be in red and the lowest rating for the show will be in blue each year.

Ep.	Broadcast date	AGB Nielsen (Nationwide)
1	February 8, 2019	3.0%
2	February 8, 2019	3.0%
3	February 15, 2019	3.0%
4	February 22, 2019	4.2%
5	March 1, 2019	2.3%
6	March 8, 2019	2.5%
7	March 15, 2019	3.0%
8	March 22, 2019	3.2%
9	March 29, 2019	2.8%
10	April 5, 2019	3.9%
11	April 12, 2019	3.1%
12	April 19, 2019	4.5%
