= Bris Funny Fest =

Fringe comedy festival

- Bris Funny Fest 2016 Logo
- Genre: Arts festival
- Dates: 2019: 7 August-1 September 2018: 1-26 August 2017: 2-20 August
- Frequency: Annually
- Location: Brisbane
- Country: Australia
- Years active: 2016–2019
- Inaugurated: 2016
- Website: BrisFunnyFest.com Note: Sometimes the website is too old to display; this will take any user to a nonexistent domain.

The Bris Funny Fest was a fringe comedy festival in Brisbane, Australia, held annually between September 2016 and September 2019.

Kath Marvelley founded the festival as an alternative event after the Brisbane Fringe Festival did not occur in 2016. Notable performers at the festival included Matt Okine, Andrew Lee, and Lindsay Webb. The festival offered a range of comedic genres, including stand-up comedy, improvisational theater, sketch comedy, and musical theater.

Operating under an open-access model akin to the Edinburgh Fringe Festival, the Bris Funny Fest relied on a volunteer-based organizational structure, with Steven Morgan leading the team in 2017. Adam O'Sullivan took over as festival director in 2018. Events during the festival took place across various venues throughout Brisbane, primarily centered around the Heya Bar in Fortitude Valley, Queensland.

Performers had the flexibility to approach any venue for hosting their events, with organizers guiding both performers and venues.

In 2020, the Bris Funny Fest was cancelled due to Covid 19. Bris Funny Fest 2021 was supposed to be happening from August 5th - 29th, 2021, however no posts have been made.

== Brisbane Fringe Festivals ==
A previous iteration of the Brisbane Fringe Festival ran from 2012 to 2015, co-directed by Kylie Southwell with comedy curation by Scott Black who worked as an advisor on Bris Funny Fest. In another iteration, the Wynnum Fringe has been held since 2020. In 2024, more similar festivals have occurred in the region, including Brisbane Comedy Festival, and Anywhere Brisbane.
