= Song Eun-i =

South Korean entertainer (born 1973)

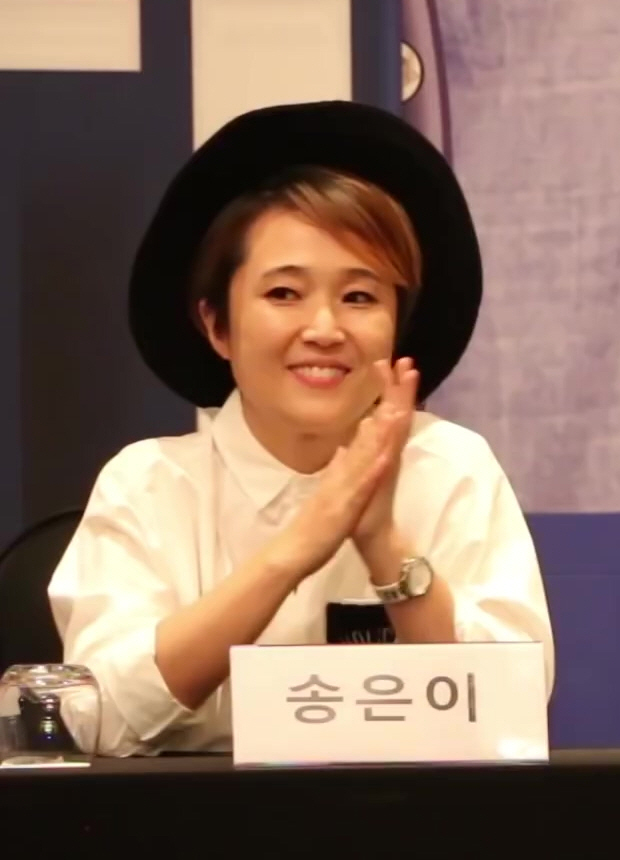
- Song in 2016
- Born: January 4, 1973 (age 53); Seoul, South Korea
- Employer: Media Lab Seesaw

Comedy career
- Years active: 1993–present
- Genres: Observational, sketch, wit, parody, slapstick, dramatic
- Musical career
- Years active: 2000–present
- Member of: Celeb Five

Korean name
- Hangul: 송은이
- Hanja: 宋恩伊
- RR: Song Euni
- MR: Song Ŭni

Song Eun-i (Korean: 송은이; born January 4, 1973) is a South Korean singer, actress and comedian. She made her debut as a theater actress in 1993. In the same year, she made her debut as a comedian in KBS. She is currently signed under her own management company Media Lab Seesaw (SISO). Currently, Song is running own company Media Lab Seesaw as CEO with her friend, Kim-Sook as director.

== Education ==
- Graduated Seoul Yangmok Elementary School
- Graduated Sinjeong Middle School
- Graduated Myungduk Girls' High School
- Graduated Seoul Institute of the Arts (Theatre College Degree Program)

== Career ==
Song first made her debut in the South Korean entertainment industry in 1993, as a KBS comedian.

In 2016, Song and fellow comedian Kim Sook published a book together, based on their podcast, Keeping Secrets (비밀보장). In the same year, Song became the CEO of CONTENTS LAB VIVO (Korean: 컨텐츠랩비보), a production company that creates internet-based content, as well as aiding Kim Jun-ho organise the Busan International Comedy Festival.
Song's production company has produced multiple web-based shows and podcasts including Keeping Secrets, The King of Shopping and Kim Saeng-min's Receipt, as well as producing the group, Celeb Five (Korean: 셀럽파이브), which Song is also a part of.

== Personal life ==
Song, among other South Korean celebrities such as Kim Won-hee and Kim Yong-man, is a part of a volunteer group called God is Love Ministry (GIL Ministry), who provide medical sponsorship for Haitian children with congenital heart disease, allowing the children to go to South Korea for medical treatment for their cardiovascular condition.

One of Song's hobbies includes woodworking, having learnt the skill with Kim Sook when she had little work and broadcasting activity.

== Filmography ==
=== Films ===
Year	Title	Role	Notes	Ref.
1994	Tyranno's Claws	Primitive woman		
2002	Emergency Act 19	Jin Ju		
2022	Open the Door	Executive producer	Premiere at 27th BIFF	

=== Current programs ===
Year	Title	Role	Notes
2018	Hidden Singer	Fixed panellist	Season 3–
2018	Omniscient Interfering View	Cast member	Episode 1 – present
2018	Food, Bless You	Cast member	
2018	Burning Youth	Cast member	Episode 148–
2018	Problem Child in House	Cast member	
2020	Money Road	Cast member	
2021	Long Live Independence	Cast	
2021	Book U Love	Host	
2021	Money Touch Me	Host	
2021	Song-eun's Manga Comeback	Host with Shin Bong-sun	
2021	National Receipt	Host with Kim Sook and Park Young-jin	
2021	Marriage Is Crazy	Host	
2022	Curling Queens	Host	MBC Lunar New Year special pilot
2022	Jump Like a Witch	Cast Member	
2022	Brave Detectives	Host	Season 1–2
2022	Chart Sisters	Host	with Celeb Five Member
2022	The Restaurant Who Forgot to Order 2	Cast Member	
2025	Sixth Sense: City Tour	Cast Member	

=== Former programs ===
Year	Title	Role	Notes
2001–2003	Super TV Sunday Is Fun	Host	
2003	Truth Game	Host	Hosted for 1 episode with Yoo Jung-hyun
2005–2009	There is! No?	Host	
2005–2007	English Town TV	Cast member	
2005–2006	Challenge! The Age of Success	Host	
2006	Alien Sam	Okguseul	Drama series
2007–2009	Infinite Girls	Cast member and host (de facto)	Season 1
2008–2010	Gold Miss Is Coming	Cast member	Segment on Good Sunday
2009–2011	GAG Star	Host	Season 2
2009–2012	Spot! Tasty Food	Host	
2010	Tent in the City	Host	
2010	Invincible Youth	Host	Temporarily replaced Kim Tae-woo
2010	If You Follow, I'm Rich Too (따라하면 나도 부자)	Host	Season 1
2010–2013	Infinite Girls	Cast member and host (de facto)	Season 3
2011	Sangsang Game	Cast member	
2011	If You Follow, I'm Rich Too (따라하면 나도 부자)	Host	Season 2
2011	Song Eun-i's Eye to Eye	Host	
2017	With You	Cast member, paired with Kim Young-chul	
2017–2018	Kim Saeng-min's Receipt	Co-host	
2018	Temperature of Judgement	Host	
2019	The Hit	Co-host with Kim Shin-young	

=== Web shows ===
Year	Title	Role	Notes	Ref.
2018	Comedian Singer Producer	Host/cast member		
2022	Celeb Five : Behind the Curtain	Cast Member	with Celeb Five Member	

=== Radio shows ===
Year	Title	Role	Notes
2007–2010	Song Eun-i and Shin Bong-sun's Donggodongrock	Host	
2015–present	Song Eun-i & Kim Sook's Sister Radio (송은이, 김숙의 언니네 라디오)	Presenter	
2022	This is Ahn Young-mi, the date muse at two o'clock	Special DJ	

=== Hosting ===
Year	Title	Notes	Ref.
2022	10th Busan International Comedy Festival	MC at the opening ceremony	

== Discography ==
=== Solo artist ===
Studio albums

Year	Title	Album details	Peak chart positions	Sales	Track listing
Year	Title	Album details	KOR	Sales	Track listing
2000	1집 Imagine	Released: December 1, 2000; Genre: Ballad; Format: CD	—	—	Track listing: 1. Imagination (상상); 2. 바램; 3. 난 그대로인걸; 4. 그대오는 길 5. 잘 알잖아요; 6. 풍경; 7. 마지막이야; 8. I'm Loving You; 9. 쿵 10. 축복해요
"—" denotes releases that did not chart or were not released in that region.

Singles

Year	Title	Album details	Peak chart positions	Sales	Album
Year	Title	Album details	KOR	Sales	Album
2006	"Abstract Memories" (초록의 추억)	Released: February 23, 2006; Label: Genie Music	—	—	Alien Sam OST
2012	"Have a Dream" (꿈을 가지고)	Released: December 4, 2012; Label: Mirrorball Music; Genre: Folk	—	—	I Love You: Unashamed Words
2015	"In His Love" (사랑으로 사랑으로)	Released: May 28, 2015; Label: LOEN Entertainment; Genre: CCM	—	—	Calling of the Heart - The Second Story Part 3. Love
"—" denotes releases that did not chart or were not released in that region.

=== Collaborative singles ===
Year	Title	Album details	Peak chart positions	Sales	Album
Year	Title	Album details	KOR	Sales	Album
2014	"Age-Height" (나이-키) (with Song Seung-hyun (F.T. Island), together as Two-Song Place)	Released: January 9, 2014; Label: FNC Entertainment, Stone Music Entertainment	—	—	Non-album single
2017	"3-Do" (3도) (with Kim Sook, together as Double-V)	Released: December 25, 2017; Label: CONTENTS LAB VIVO, Kakao M	—	—	Non-album single
"—" denotes releases that did not chart or were not released in that region.

=== Infinite Girls ===
Year	Title	Album details	Peak chart positions	Sales	Track listing
Year	Title	Album details	KOR	Sales	Track listing
2008	Project Make Infinite Girls Singers (무한걸스 가수되기 프로젝트)	Released: November 13, 2008; Label: Danal Entertainment; Genre: Dance	—	—	Track listing: 1. Imagination (상상) (Full ver.); 2. Imagination (상상) (Original ver.); 3. Imagination (상상) (Inst.)
"—" denotes releases that did not chart or were not released in that region.

=== Celeb Five ===
Year	Title	Album details	Peak chart positions	Sales	Album
Year	Title	Album details	KOR	Sales	Album
2018	"Celeb Five (I Wanna Be a Celeb)" (셀럽파이브 (셀럽이 되고 싶어))	Released: January 24, 2018; Label: CONTENTS LAB VIVO, NHN Entertainment; Genre: Dance	—	—	Celeb No.1 (셀럽 No.1)
2018	"Shutter" (셔터) feat. Lee Deok-hwa	Released: November 19, 2018; Label: CONTENTS LAB VIVO, LOEN Entertainment; Genre: Synth-pop, dance	—	—	Shutter (셔터)
"—" denotes releases that did not chart or were not released in that region.

== Awards and nominations ==
Year	Award	Category	Nominated work	Result	Ref.
2002	Korean Film Festival	Photogenic Award		Won	
2002	KBS Entertainment Awards	Broadcasting Progress award		Won	
2003	Ministry of Culture and Tourism	Appreciation plaque		Won	
2008	SBS Entertainment Awards	Best Teamwork Award	Gold Miss is Coming	Won	
2009	SBS Entertainment Awards	Radio DJ Award		Won	
2010	16th Korean Entertainment Art Award	TV Progress Award		Won	
2017	SBS Entertainment Awards	Radio DJ Award	Song Eun-i, Kim Sook's Sisters Radio	Won	
2018	54th Baeksang Arts Awards	Best Variety Performer – Female	Omniscient Interfering View	Won	
2018	16th KBS Entertainment Awards	Top Excellence Award in Variety	Problem Child in House	Nominated	
2018	18th MBC Entertainment Awards	Top Excellence Award in Variety	Omniscient Interfering View	Won	
2019	19th MBC Entertainment Awards	Top Excellence Award in Variety Category (Female)	Omniscient Interfering View	Won	
2019	Korean Popular Culture and Arts Awards	Prime Minister's Commendation		Won	
2020	18th KBS Entertainment Awards	Producers' Special Award	Problem Child in House	Won	
2021	57th Baeksang Arts Awards	Best Variety Performer – Female	Problem Child in House; Long Live Independence	Nominated	
2021	Brand Customer Loyalty Award 2021	Entertainer (Variety Show - Female	—N/a	Won	
2022	58th Baeksang Arts Awards	Best Female Variety Performer	Song Eun-i	Nominated	
2025	KBS Entertainment Awards	Top Excellence Award (Show/Variety)	Problem Child in House	Won	
