= Comedy festival =

Comedy performance event

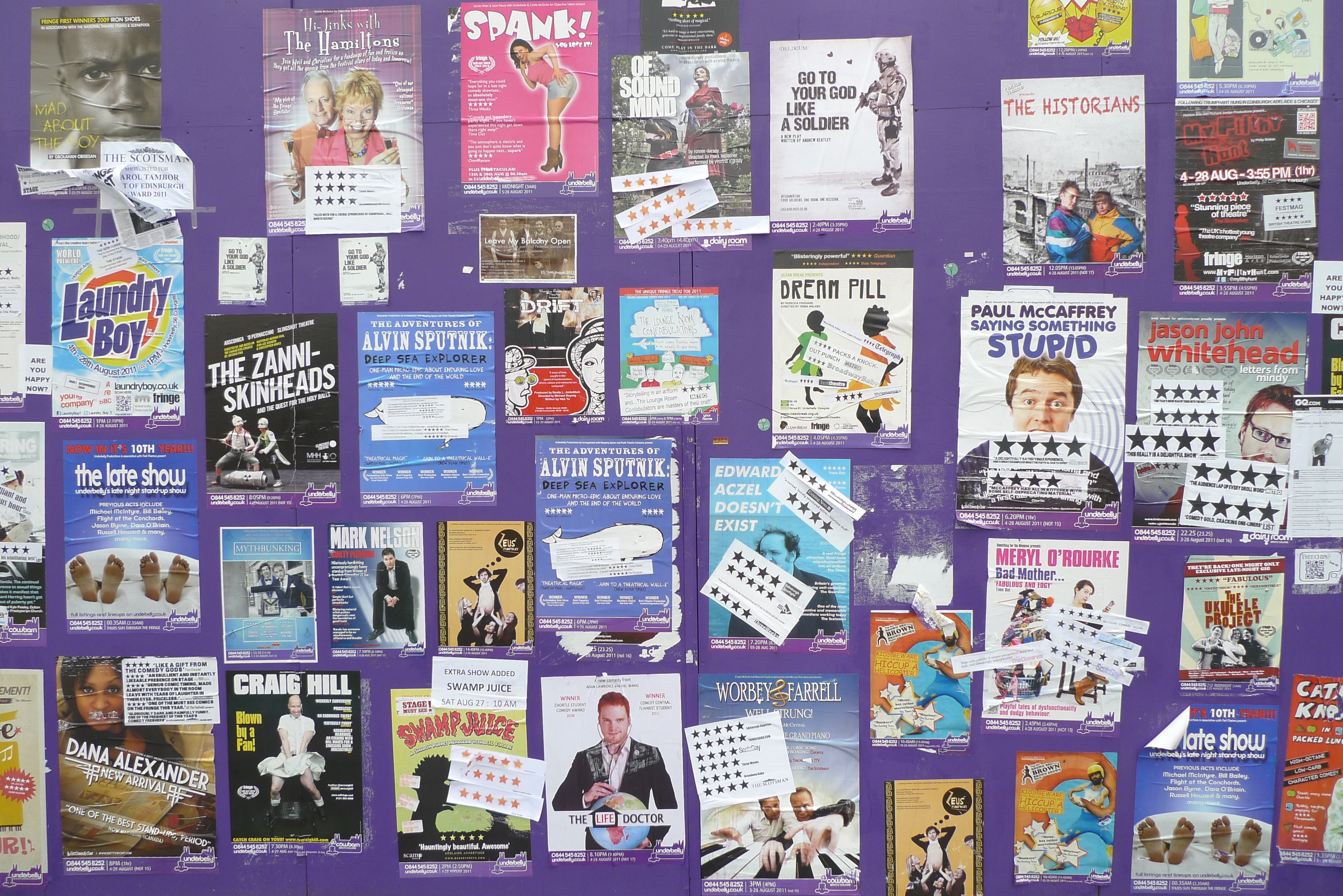
A wall of posters for comedy events at the Edinburgh Festival Fringe in Scotland

A comedy festival is a celebration of comedy with many shows, venues, comedy performers (such as stand up comics, sketch troupes, variety performers, etc.) and is held over a specific block of time. Normally, each festival has a diverse range of comedy themes and genres.

== Notable examples ==
- Birmingham Comedy Festival
- Bris Funny Fest
- Busan International Comedy Festival
- Kilkenny Cat Laughs Comedy Festival
- Cologne Comedy Festival
- Edinburgh Festival Fringe
- Freaky Weeky Fest in Denver, Colorado
- Glasgow International Comedy Festival, Europe's largest comedy festival
- HK International Comedy Festival
- Just for Laughs (Montreal, Canada, the largest international comedy festival in the world
- Leicester Comedy Festival, the UK's longest running comedy festival
- Melbourne International Comedy Festival
- New Zealand International Comedy Festival
- Perth International Comedy Festival
- RuhrHochDeutsch in Dortmund Germany's largest and longest comedy festival
- SF Sketchfest in San Francisco
- Toronto Sketch Comedy Festival
- Winnipeg Fringe Theatre Festival
- World's Funniest Island

== See also ==
- List of improvisational theater festivals
