= Infinite Girls =

2007–2013 South Korean TV series

- Also known as: Muhan Girls
- Genre: Reality television
- Presented by: Song Eun-i (de facto)
- Starring: Song Eun-i; Shin Bong-sun; Kim Shin-young; Hwangbo; Baek Bo-ram; Jung Ga-eun; Jung Shi-ah; Ahn Young-mi; Kim Sook
- Country of origin: South Korea
- Original language: Korean
- No. of seasons: 3

Production
- Camera setup: Multi-camera
- Running time: 60 minutes

Original release
- Network: MBC
- Release: October 15, 2007 – November 25, 2013

Related
- Infinite Challenge

Infinite Girls (Korean: 무한걸스; RR: Muhan geolseu; also known as Muhan Girls) is a Korean variety program. The program is an all-female version of Infinite Challenge. The show consisted of three seasons with six MCs as its mascots. The show reached the peak of its popularity in November 2009 so it got two more seasons.

== Seasons ==
- Season 1 (October 15, 2007 – November 27, 2009)
- Season 2 (December 4, 2009 – August 27, 2010)
- Season 3 (December 9, 2010 – November 25, 2013)
