= Good Sunday =

South Korean television reality-variety show

- Hangul: 일요일이 좋다
- Hanja: 日曜日이 좋다
- RR: Iryoiri jota
- MR: Iryoiri chot'a
- Genre: Reality television Comedy; Variety show
- Starring: Various
- Country of origin: South Korea
- Original language: Korean
- No. of episodes: 664

Production
- Running time: Approx. 190 minutes per episode

Original release
- Network: SBS
- Release: March 28, 2004 – March 19, 2017

Related
- Real Situation Saturday

Good Sunday (Korean: 일요일이 좋다) was a South Korean reality-variety show shown on the SBS network, which competes directly against MBC's Sunday Night and KBS2's Happy Sunday line-up. The program has suffered from the competition of Happy Sunday and Sunday Night but reached its way to #1 on the Top 20 Charts every Sunday. Good Sunday consists of a line-up of "corner programs", or segments, which air within the program. The program ended on March 19, 2017, opting for individual programs divided into two parts for inserting commercials (which is not allowed for programs on terrestrial television).

== History ==
Prior to Good Sunday, Ultra Sunday Hurray! (초특급 일요일만세) began airing on March 18, 2001. Beginning on January 20, 2002 Show! Sunday World (쇼!일요천하) aired, and on July 14, 2002 Beautiful Sunday (뷰티풀 선데이) aired until March 28, 2004, where Good Sunday began to air its new, popular programming. As of July 11, 2010, the program began airing in high definition for the first time. (Only Part 1, Running Man, aired in HD as Part 2, Family Outing 2, which still aired in SD, was airing its last episode.) As of July 18, 2010, both Part 1 and 2 (Running Man and Heroes) air in HD. Good Sunday was divided into two parts, from July 27, 2008 to May 8, 2011. On May 22, 2011, it returned to airing as one "whole" program beginning at 5:20 pm KST and ending at 8:00 pm for about 160 minutes. As of September 25, 2011, Good Sunday is divided into two parts again, Part 1 airing at 5:20 pm and Part 2 airing at 6:50 pm KST, in an effort to boost ratings. On December 4, 2011, it returned to airing as one whole program again beginning at 5:00 pm for about 180 minutes.

== Broadcasting times ==
- March 28, 2004 – October 29, 2006 (17:50 – 20:00; 2 hours 10 minutes)
- November 5, 2006 – November 4, 2007 (17:30 – 18:40; 1 hour 10 minutes)
- November 11, 2007 – May 18, 2008 (17:30 – 20:00; 2 hours 30 minutes)
- May 25, 2008 – August 21, 2011 (17:20 – 20:00; 2 hours 40 minutes)
  - July 27, 2008 – July 11, 2010; March 20, 2011 – May 8, 2011 (17:20 – 18:40; 1 hour 20 minutes; Part 1)
  - July 27, 2008 – May 23, 2010; July 11, 2010; March 20, 2011 – May 1, 2011 (18:50 – 20:00; 1 hour 10 minutes; Part 2)
  - July 18, 2010 – March 13, 2011 (17:20 – 18:35; 1 hour 15 minutes; Part 1)
  - July 18, 2010 – March 13, 2011 (18:45 – 20:00; 1 hour 15 minutes; Part 2)
- August 28, 2011 – December 4, 2011 (17:05 – 20:00; 2 hours 55 minutes)
  - September 25 – November 27, 2011 (17:05 – 18:30; 1 hour 25 minutes; Part 1)
  - September 25 – November 27, 2011 (18:40 – 20:00; 1 hour 20 minutes; Part 2)
- December 11, 2011 – November 11, 2012 (17:00 – 20:00; 3 hours)
- November 18, 2012 – November 17, 2013 (16:55 – 20:00; 3 hours 5 minutes)
- November 24, 2013 – April 13, 2014 (16:40 – 20:00; 3 hours 20 minutes)
- May 4 – August 17, 2014 (16:10 – 20:00; 3 hours 50 minutes)
- August 24, 2014 – March 19, 2017 (16:50 – 20:00; 3 hours 10 minutes)
  - March 20, 2016 – March 19, 2017 (16:50 – 18:25; 1 hour 35 minutes; Part 1)
  - March 20, 2016 – March 19, 2017 (18:30 – 20:00; 1 hour 30 minutes; Part 2)

== Former segments ==
=== Running Man ===
- Aired: Ongoing
- Starring: Yoo Jae-suk, Haha, Ji Suk-jin, Kim Jong-kook, Lee Kwang-soo, Song Ji-hyo, Kang Gary, Yang Se-chan, Jeon So-min

Running Man (Korean: 런닝맨), first broadcast on July 11, 2010, is currently the longest-running program on Good Sunday surpassing X-man on February 3, 2013 with 410 episodes so far. It has garnered attention as being the come-back program for Yoo Jae-suk after leaving Good Sunday's Family Outing in February 2010. This show is classified as a game-variety show, where the MCs and guests complete missions in a landmark to win a race.

=== Flower Crew ===
- Aired: November 27, 2016 – March 19, 2017
- Starring: Seo Jang-hoon, Jo Se-ho, Ahn Jung-hwan, Yoo Byung-jae, Kang Seung-yoon (Winner), Lee Sung-jae

Flower Crew (꽃놀이패) is filled with travel experiences of the six characters whose luck and fate depend on the live votes of the audience make it more unique, suspense and unpredictable outcome to story line and cast member's fate in decided the group. First broadcast as the pilots on July 15 and 16, 2016, the program was picked up and began airing on Monday night at 23:10 (KST) from September 5 to November 21, 2016, then it changed the broadcast time to 16:50 (KST) and replacing Fantastic Duo starting November 27, 2016.

=== Fantastic Duo ===
- Aired: April 17, 2016 – November 20, 2016
- Starring: Jun Hyun-moo, Various Singers

Fantastic Duo (판타스틱 듀오) is a competition program featuring singers collaborating with ordinary people. First broadcast as a pilot on February 9, 2016, the program was picked up and aired from April 17 to November 20, 2016, replacing K-pop Star 5.

=== K-pop Star 5 ===
- Aired: November 22, 2015 – April 10, 2016
- Starring: Jun Hyun-moo, Park Jin-young, Yang Hyun-suk, You Hee-yeol

Survival Audition K-pop Star 5 (서바이벌 오디션 K팝스타 4) is the fifth season of audition program K-pop Star, with returning judges Park Jin-young, Yang Hyun-suk, and You Hee-yeol. The program returned for a new season on November 22, 2015, replacing Take Care of My Dad.

=== Take Care of My Dad ===
- Aired: April 26 – November 1, 2015
- Starring: Lee Kyung-kyu, Kang Seok-woo, Cho Jae-hyun, Jo Min-ki

Take Care of My Dad (아빠를 부탁해) was a reality program featuring celebrity fathers who do not express themselves much and their daughters interacting in daily life. First broadcast on February 20, 2015, the program moved to Good Sunday beginning April 26, 2015, replacing K-pop Star 4.

=== K-pop Star 4 ===
- Aired: November 23, 2014 – April 19, 2015
- Starring: Jun Hyun-moo, Park Jin-young, Yang Hyun-suk, You Hee-yeol

Survival Audition K-pop Star 4 (서바이벌 오디션 K팝스타 4) is the fourth season of audition program K-pop Star, with returning judges Park Jin-young, Yang Hyun-suk, and You Hee-yeol. The program returned for a new season on November 23, 2014, replacing Roommate.

=== Roommate ===
- Aired: May 4 – November 16, 2014 (in Good Sunday)
- Starring: Chan-yeol, Hong Soo-hyun, Park Bom, Jo Se-ho, Lee Dong-wook, Lee So-ra, Nana, Park Min-woo, Seo Kang-joon, Shin Sung-woo, Song Ga-yeon

Roommate (룸메이트) is a reality program featuring eleven celebrities living together, sharing common spaces such as the kitchen, living room, and washrooms. The program aims to show the life, troubles, and joys of eleven different celebrities as they form friendships and possibly enemies living together under one roof. Roommate replaces K-pop Star 3 and began airing on May 4, 2014. With the return of K-pop Star to Good Sunday, Roommate moved to airing every Tuesday at 11:15 pm as a stand-alone program starting November 25, 2014.

=== K-pop Star 3 ===
- Aired: November 24, 2013 – April 13, 2014
- Starring: Jun Hyun-moo, Park Jin-young, Yang Hyun-suk, You Hee-yeol

Survival Audition K-pop Star 3 (서바이벌 오디션 K팝스타 3) is the third season of audition program K-pop Star, with returning judges Park Jin-young and Yang Hyun-suk, and new judge You Hee-yeol. The program returned for a new season on November 24, 2013, replacing Barefooted Friends.

=== Barefooted Friends ===
- Aired: April 21 – November 17, 2013
- Starring: Kang Ho-dong, Yoon Jong-shin, Kim Bum-soo, Kim Hyun-joong, Yoon Shi-yoon, Eunhyuk, Uee

Barefooted Friends (맨발의 친구들) is a real variety program featuring Kang Ho-dong, who is returning to Good Sunday after leaving X-Man in April 2007. The members travel to foreign countries to experience "real happiness" with locals. The program first broadcast on April 21, 2013, replacing K-pop Star 2.

=== K-pop Star 2 ===
- Aired: November 18, 2012 – April 14, 2013
- Starring: Yoon Do-hyun, Boom, BoA, Park Jin-young, Yang Hyun-suk

Survival Audition K-pop Star 2 (서바이벌 오디션 K팝스타 2) is the second season of audition program K-pop Star, with returning judges, BoA, Park Jin-young, and Yang Hyun-suk. The program returned for a new season on November 18, 2012, replacing Law of the Jungle 2. The program was renewed for a third season with the same judges, scheduled to air in October 2013 possibly in a new timeslot.

=== Kim Byung-man's Law of the Jungle 2 ===
- Aired: May 6 – November 11, 2012 (in Good Sunday)
- Starring: Kim Byung-man and other cast members of the trip in Vanuatu, Siberia and Madagascar

Kim Byung-man's Law of the Jungle 2 (김병만의 정글의 법칙 시즌2) is a reality-documentary program featuring comedian Kim Byung-man and his tribe as they explore and survive in nature. With locations being in Vanuatu, Siberia in Russia, and Madagascar. This is the second season of Kim Byung-man's Law of the Jungle, which was a ratings success in its Friday night time slot in the latter half of 2011. The program began to air on May 6, 2012, replacing K-pop Star, but its last episode was reverted to Friday at 10:00 pm, to make way for K-pop Star 2, where its next season has aired in that time slot ever since.

=== K-pop Star ===
- Aired: December 4, 2011 – April 29, 2012
- Starring: Yoon Do-hyun, Boom, BoA, Park Jin-young, Yang Hyun-suk

Survival Audition K-pop Star (서바이벌 오디션 K팝스타) is an audition program featuring the "Big 3" entertainment companies (SM, YG, and JYP). People around the world audition to become the next "K-pop Star", who will be judged by a representative of each company (BoA, Park Jin-young, and Yang Hyun-suk). The winner will have a choice of which company to sign with, and many prizes including three hundred million won. The first season began to air on December 4, 2011, replacing BIGsTORY. The program was renewed for a second season with the same judges and an upgraded format, and aired from November 2012 to April 2013.

=== BIGsTORY ===
- Aired: August 28 – November 27, 2011
- Starring: Shin Dong-yup, Lee Soo-kyung, Shin Bong-sun, Lee Kyu-han, Sean Lee

Diet Survival BIGsTORY (다이어트 서바이벌 빅토리) is a new survival program featuring "Diet King", Sean Lee. Twenty obese people will go through intense training and diets to "change your body, change your life". The winner will receive one hundred million won, a car, and many fabulous prizes. The title "BIGsTORY" which sounds like "victory" in Korean, means the "big" "story" these people have come from and will make, and the "victory" they will achieve. The program began to air on August 28, 2011, replacing Kim Yu-na's Kiss & Cry.

=== Kim Yuna's Kiss & Cry ===
- Aired: May 22, 2011 – August 21, 2011
- Starring: Kim Yuna, Shin Dong-yup, IU, Jin Ji-hee, Kim Byung-man, Krystal, Lee Ah-hyun, Lee Kyou-hyuk, Park Joon-geum, Seo Ji-seok, Son Dam-bi, U-Know Yun-ho

Kim Yuna's Kiss & Cry (김연아의 키스 앤 크라이) is a survival audition program featuring champion figure skater, Kim Yuna. Ten celebrities and ten professional skaters will form couples and challenge each other in figure skating to become the winning team, who will be performing with Kim Yuna at a special ice show in August. The program is scheduled to air on May 22, 2011, replacing Heroes. The program was scheduled to return for a second season in April 2012 in a different time slot, but has been postponed due to Kim Yuna's busy schedule.

=== Heroes ===
- Aired: July 18, 2010 – May 1, 2011
- Starring: Noh Hong-chul, Lee Hwi-jae, Noh Sa-yeon, Ji-yeon, Seo In-young, Kahi, Hong Soo-ah, Lee Jin, Shin Bong-sun, IU, Yoo In-na, Nicole Jung, Narsha, Jung Ga-eun

Heroes (영웅호걸; 英雄豪傑) is a girl-group variety show that first aired on July 18, 2010, replacing Gold Miss is Coming. It is classified as a "popularity search variety", where the female celebrities compete to find out which of them is more popular among citizens. The show ended on May 1, 2011 due to low ratings and has been replaced by Kiss & Cry.

=== Family Outing 2 ===
- Aired: February 21, 2010 – July 11, 2010
- Starring: Kim Won-hee, Yoon Sang-hyun, Ji Sang-ryeol, Shin Bong-sun, Yoona, Ok Taecyeon, Jo Kwon, Kim Heechul, Jang Dong-min

Family Outing Season 2 (패밀리가 떴다 2; lit. 'Family's Here 2') was the second season of Family Outing. It featured a different concept, cast, and production team, but ended due to low ratings.

=== Gold Miss is Coming ===
- Aired: October 12, 2008 – June 6, 2010
- Starring: Noh Hong-chul, Yang Jung-a, Lee In-hye, Song Eun-i, Park So-hyun, Shin Bong-sun, Hyun Young, Seo Yoo-jung

Gold Miss is Coming (골드미스가 간다) (also known as Gold Miss Diaries) is a reality show where 6 "Gold Misses" are on a mission to find a husband. They will live with each other for 2 days in the "Gold House" and through games, whoever that wins will have an opportunity to date someone.

=== Family Outing ===
- Aired: June 15, 2008 – February 14, 2010
- Starring: Yoo Jae-suk, Lee Hyo-ri, Yoon Jong-shin, Kim Soo-ro, Kang Dae-sung, Kim Jong-kook, Park Si-yeon, Park Hae-jin, Park Ye-jin, Lee Chun-hee

Family Outing (패밀리가 떴다; lit. 'Family's Here') was first broadcast on June 15, 2008, it has yet since become the top rated program on Sunday. The second season began on February 21, 2010. Family Outing is a reality show, where the "Family," consisting of Korean celebrities and entertainers. Goes to an elderlys home in the countrysides of South Korea and takes care of the home while the elderly family goes on a vacation. During their stay, the "Family" takes on tasks assigned by the elderly family. During the tasks, the Family will play games related to the surroundings. They will also cook dinner and breakfast for themselves during their stay. A "Popular Vote" game was played before they go to bed, as to where the members of the family will sleep but is seen not doing it anymore. At the end of their stay, the elderly family will return to the home and be greeted by the Family as they will move on to their next destination.

=== Change ===
- Aired: February 17, 2008 – October 15, 2008
- Starring: Shin Dong-yup, Shin Bong-sun, Kang-in, Noh Hong-chul

Change (체인지) is a program where celebrities are given a "new face", and are sent to live through a day as a different person.

=== Find Mr. Kim ===
- Aired: February 10, 2008 – February 24, 2008
- Starring: Seo Kyung-suk, Yoon Jung-su, Kim Sung-su, Moon Hee-jun, Alex, Charles

Find Mr. Kim (김서방을 찾아라) is a program about delivering packages to people around the world.

=== Meet the In-Laws ===
- Aired: November 11, 2007 – July 20, 2008
- Starring: Nam Hee-seok, Han Young

Meet the In-Laws (사돈 처음 뵙겠습니다) is a program about foreign brides meeting their in-laws and family members for the first time.

=== Mission Impossible ===
- Aired: November 11, 2007 – June 8, 2008
- Starring: Yoo Jae-suk, Shin Jung-hwan, Yoon Jong-shin

Mission Impossible (기적의 승부사/기승史) (also known as Miraculous Victory and Defeat) is a program where two teams, one team of celebrities and one team of announcers, complete tasks with 10 chances to succeed. Due to poor ratings, it was changed to "기승史", a historical costume program, with a concept of two teams competing for fun.

=== Explorers of the Human Body ===
- Aired: November 11, 2007 – February 3, 2008
- Starring: Shin Dong-yup, Super Junior

Explorers of the Human Body (인체탐험대) features Super Junior, as they investigate parts of the human body. Due to Super Junior's busy schedule, the show was canceled after a plan to air a second season. Explorers of the Human Body was one of the highest rating shows to appear in the line-up due to comical and educational content.

=== Good Sunday Old TV ===
- Aired: June 17, 2007 – November 4, 2007
- Starring: Yoo Jae-suk, Shin Jung-hwan, Yoon Jong-shin, Haha, Han Young, Kim Ju-hee

Old TV (일요일이 좋다 옛날 TV) features celebrities from the past and shows how television was broadcast back in their days. This program was the last of the short lived stand-alone 70 mins Good Sunday.

=== Good Sunday Haja! Go ===
- Aired: April 15, 2007 – June 10, 2007
- Starring: Yoo Jae-suk, Park Myung-su, Shin Jung-hwan, Haha

Haja! GO (일요일이 좋다 하자!GO) (literally Do It! GO) featured guests playing gag games.) Calling itself the first gag variety, the show was accused of plagiarizing a program on Fuji TV and was cancelled. This program was one of the short lived stand-alone 70 mins Good Sunday.

=== New X-man Good Sunday ===
- Aired: November 5, 2006 – April 8, 2007
- Starring: Yoo Jae-suk, Kang Ho-dong, Lee Hyuk-jae

New X-man (X맨 일요일이 좋다) was a revamped version of X-man, where the X-man was decided by a survey by other celebrities on a certain topic, the team with X-man in the end would lose. This program was one of the short lived stand-alone 70 mins Good Sunday.

=== Bungee Song King/S-MATCH ===
- Aired: August 27, 2006 – October 29, 2006
- Starring: Tak Jae-hoon, Park Su-hong, Yoon Jung-su

Bungee Song King and S-MATCH (번지 노래왕/에스-메치) were two special programs that filled in Roundly Roundly's absence.

=== Roundly Roundly ===
- Aired: April 30, 2006 – August 13, 2006
- Starring: Tak Jae-hoon, Park Su-hong, Yoon Jung-soo, Im Hyung-joon

Roundly Roundly (둥글게 둥글게) is a program where the hosts and guests need to think like a child and understand them more.

=== X-man ===
- Aired: October 10, 2004 – October 29, 2006 (in Good Sunday)
- Starring: Yoo Jae-suk, Kang Ho-dong, Lee Hyuk-jae

X-man (X맨) is one of Korea's most famous variety shows. Various celebrities collaborate into two teams and duel out against each other. The main object is to find the X-man; a randomly picked celebrity who purposely tried to sabotage his/her teammates' chances of winning.

=== Reverse Drama ===
- Aired: August 8, 2004 – April 23, 2006
- Starring: Various Celebrities

Reverse Drama (대결! 반전드라마/반전극장) (also known as Banjun Drama) features two mini-dramas that have "reverse" endings. The ending are generally surprising and would not be expected by the viewers. The two mini-dramas compete by votes cast on the main site.

=== Yoo Jae-suk and Fullness of the Heart ===
- Aired: May 30, 2004 – September 19, 2004
- Starring: Yoo Jae-suk, Shin Jung-hwan, Ji Sang-ryul, Nam Chang-hee, Kim Jong Suk

Yoo Jae-suk and Fullness of the Heart (유재석과 감개무량) was the predecessor of Infinite Challenge.

=== Medical Non-Fiction! Last Warning ===
- Aired: May 30, 2004 – August 1, 2004
- Starring: Kang Ho-dong, Lee Hwi-jae

Medical Non-Fiction! Last Warning (메디컬 논픽션! 최종경고) was an informational program where celebrities would reenact symptoms to inform viewers of illnesses.

=== Star Olympiad ===
- Aired: May 2, 2004 – May 23, 2004
- Starring: Kang Ho-dong, Lee Hwi-jae

Star Olympiad (스타 올림피아드) was a program where teams of celebrities would compete in events.

=== Healthy Men and Women ===
- Aired: March 28, 2004 – April 25, 2004
- Starring: Kang Ho-dong, Lee Hwi-jae, Shin Jung-hwan, Yoo Jae-suk

Healthy Men and Women (건강남녀) was classified as a "love fantasy show", where the MCs and guests would fight for each other's love through comical acts.

=== Waving the Korean Flag ===
- Aired: March 28, 2004 – May 23, 2004
- Starring: Yoo Jae-suk, Ji Sang-ryul

Waving the Korean Flag (태극기 휘날리며) was a program featuring South Korea's famous athletes.

=== Shin Dong-yeop's Love's Commissioned Mother ===
- Aired: March 28, 2004 – October 3, 2004
- Starring: Shin Dong-yup

Shin Dong-yeop's Love's Commissioned Mother (신동엽의 사랑의 위탁모) was a program where female celebrities would "adopt" child(ren) and raise them over a week. It is the predecessor to Our Children Have Changed.

== Ratings ==
=== 2004 ===
List of ratings (episode 1–39)
- All ratings are by AGB Nielsen Media Research unless otherwise noted. Ratings with a (*) are provided by TNS Media Korea (TNmS as of January 27, 2010) where AGB is unavailable.

Episode #	Original Airdate	AGB Ratings
Episode #	Original Airdate	Nationwide
Love's Commissioned Mother + Waving the Korean Flag + Healthy Men and Women
1	March 28, 2004	*8.8%
2	April 4, 2004	-
3	April 11, 2004	*7.9%
4	April 18, 2004	-
5	April 25, 2004	-
Love's Commissioned Mother + Waving the Korean Flag + Star Olympiad
6	May 2, 2004	-
7	May 9, 2004	-
8	May 16, 2004	-
9	May 23, 2004	-
Love's Commissioned Mother + Fullness of the Heart + Last Warning
10	May 30, 2004	*7.3%
11	June 6, 2004	-
12	June 13, 2004	-
13	June 20, 2004	-
14	June 27, 2004	-
15	July 4, 2004	-
16	July 11, 2004	-
16	July 18, 2004	-
17	July 25, 2004	-
18	August 1, 2004	-
Love's Commissioned Mother + Fullness of the Heart + Reverse Drama
19	August 8, 2004	*18.1%
20	August 15, 2004	-
21	August 22, 2004	16.2%
22	August 29, 2004	12.1%
23	September 5, 2004	-
24	September 12, 2004	-
25	September 19, 2004	-
26	September 26, 2004	-
27	October 3, 2004	-
X-Man + Reverse Drama
28	October 10, 2004	*14.1%
29	October 17, 2004	*17.1%
30	October 24, 2004	*18.1%
31	October 31, 2004	18.4%
32	November 7, 2004	19.5%
33	November 14, 2004	19.1%
34	November 21, 2004	18.9%
35	November 28, 2004	18.8%
36	December 5, 2004	23.3%
37	December 12, 2004	22.1%
38	December 19, 2004	23.9%
39	December 26, 2004	22.3%

=== 2005 ===
List of ratings (episode 40–91)
- All ratings are by AGB Nielsen Media Research unless otherwise noted. Ratings with a (*) are provided by TNS Media Korea (TNmS as of January 27, 2010) where AGB is unavailable.

Episode #	Original Airdate	AGB Ratings	
Episode #	Original Airdate	Nationwide	Seoul National Capital Area
X-Man + Reverse Drama
40	January 2, 2005	19.7%	-
41	January 9, 2005	19.3%	-
42	January 16, 2005	19.3%	-
43	January 23, 2005	21.0%	-
44	January 30, 2005	22.1%	-
45	February 6, 2005	21.5%	-
46	February 13, 2005	20.3%	-
47	February 20, 2005	19.0%	-
48	February 27, 2005	19.7%	-
49	March 6, 2005	20.2%	-
50	March 13, 2005	19.8%	-
51	March 20, 2005	17.8%	18.0%
52	March 27, 2005	19.5%	19.5%
53	April 3, 2005	18.3%	18.6%
54	April 10, 2005	*18.1%	17.8%
55	April 17, 2005	17.8%	18.4%
56	April 24, 2005	18.6%	19.7%
57	May 1, 2005	16.4%	17.4%
58	May 8, 2005	14.4%	14.5%
59	May 15, 2005	15.2%	15.3%
60	May 22, 2005	18.2%	20.0%
61	May 29, 2005	16.3%	16.6%
62	June 5, 2005	13.6%	14.1%
63	June 12, 2005	15.3%	16.5%
64	June 19, 2005	16.5%	17.5%
65	June 26, 2005	17.5%	18.1%
66	July 3, 2005	18.4%	19.3%
67	July 10, 2005	14.7%	14.9%
68	July 17, 2005	17.5%	18.3%
69	July 24, 2005	20.5%	21.3%
70	July 31, 2005	13.6%	14.3%
71	August 7, 2005	18.8%	19.7%
72	August 14, 2005	14.8%	15.4%
73	August 21, 2005	16.5%	16.9%
74	August 28, 2005	17.8%	18.6%
75	September 4, 2005	18.9%	20.0%
76	September 11, 2005	18.6%	19.1%
77	September 18, 2005	12.7%	13.1%
78	September 25, 2005	17.6%	18.8%
79	October 2, 2005	19.6%	20.2%
80	October 9, 2005	19.9%	20.9%
81	October 16, 2005	16.4%	17.2%
82	October 23, 2005	18.7%	19.3%
83	October 30, 2005	17.9%	18.7%
84	November 6, 2005	15.7%	16.1%
85	November 13, 2005	15.3%	16.2%
86	November 20, 2005	16.1%	16.8%
87	November 27, 2005	16.2%	17.3%
88	December 4, 2005	19.1%	20.4%
89	December 11, 2005	17.5%	18.4%
90	December 18, 2005	17.1%	18.3%
91	December 25, 2005	17.1%	18.6%

=== 2006 ===
List of ratings (episode 92–143)
- All ratings are by AGB Nielsen Media Research unless otherwise noted. Ratings with a (*) are provided by TNS Media Korea (TNmS as of January 27, 2010) where AGB is unavailable.

Episode #	Original Airdate	AGB Ratings	
Episode #	Original Airdate	Nationwide	Seoul National Capital Area
X-Man + Reverse Drama
92	January 1, 2006	17.1%	18.5%
93	January 8, 2006	16.9%	18.8%
94	January 15, 2006	15.9%	17.3%
95	January 22, 2006	15.2%	16.9%
96	January 29, 2006	9.4%	10.9%
97	February 5, 2006	15.0%	16.5%
98	February 12, 2006	14.9%	16.9%
99	February 19, 2006	12.4%	13.2%
100	February 26, 2006	13.5%	15.1%
101	March 5, 2006	13.8%	15.4%
102	March 12, 2006	13.8%	15.7%
103	March 19, 2006	12.7%	13.7%
104	March 26, 2006	10.9%	12.3%
105	April 2, 2006	11.3%	13.3%
106	April 9, 2006	11.1%	12.6%
107	April 16, 2006	9.9%	10.6%
108	April 23, 2006	11.3%	12.3%
X-Man + Roundly Roundly
109	April 30, 2006	9.5%	10.2%
110	May 7, 2006	10.0%	10.8%
111	May 14, 2006	9.1%	10.1%
112	May 21, 2006	12.0%	13.0%
113	May 28, 2006	10.8%	11.9%
114	June 4, 2006	11.5%	13.0%
115	June 11, 2006	10.8%	12.2%
116	June 18, 2006	10.5%	11.9%
117	June 25, 2006	*10.7%	9.6%
118	July 2, 2006	11.6%	11.9%
119	July 9, 2006	11.9%	12.3%
120	July 16, 2006	13.1%	13.4%
121	July 23, 2006	10.7%	10.5%
122	July 30, 2006	*9.4%	<(9.0%)
123	August 6, 2006	*10.0%	<(9.7%)
124	August 13, 2006	<(8.8%)	<(9.1%)
X-Man + Bungee King/S-MATCH
125	August 27, 2006	*11.2%	10.9%
126	September 3, 2006	*10.1%	<(9.8%)
127	September 10, 2006	*12.5%	<(10.0%)
128	September 17, 2006	11.2%	12.1%
129	September 24, 2006	10.7%	11.8%
130	October 1, 2006	11.4%	12.5%
131	October 8, 2006	11.7%	12.9%
132	October 15, 2006	10.0%	10.4%
133	October 22, 2006	10.6%	10.8%
134	October 29, 2006	*11.4%	10.0%
New X-Man Good Sunday
135	November 5, 2006	12.5%	12.7%
136	November 12, 2006	11.3%	12.6%
137	November 19, 2006	14.9%	16.4%
138	November 26, 2006	13.0%	13.7%
139	December 3, 2006	13.4%	15.2%
140	December 10, 2006	13.8%	15.0%
141	December 17, 2006	15.2%	16.8%
142	December 24, 2006	10.8%	11.8%
143	December 31, 2006	10.3%	11.6%

=== 2007 ===
List of ratings (episode 144–195)
- All ratings are by AGB Nielsen Media Research unless otherwise noted. Ratings with a (*) are provided by TNS Media Korea (TNmS as of January 27, 2010) where AGB is unavailable.

Episode #	Original Airdate	AGB Ratings	
Episode #	Original Airdate	Nationwide	Seoul National Capital Area
New X-Man Good Sunday
144	January 7, 2007	12.1%	13.1%
145	January 14, 2007	11.9%	12.9%
146	January 21, 2007	11.9%	12.9%
147	January 28, 2007	<(11.4%)	11.7%
148	February 4, 2007	*11.8%	11.9%
149	February 11, 2007	12.8%	13.2%
150	February 18, 2007	8.6%	8.8%
151	February 25, 2007	<(10.4%)	<(11.1%)
152	March 4, 2007	<(11.1%)	10.6%
153	March 11, 2007	*12.7%	<(10.8%)
154	March 18, 2007	10.4%	11.3%
155	March 25, 2007	<(10.5%)	<(11.3%)
156	April 1, 2007	9.1%	<(10.9%)
157	April 8, 2007	6.5%	<(10.1%)
Good Sunday Haja! GO
158	April 15, 2007	6.4%	<(10.0%)
159	April 22, 2007	6.1%	<(9.4%)
160	April 29, 2007	<(9.1%)	<(9.8%)
161	May 6, 2007	*6.1%	<(9.3%)
162	May 13, 2007	*6.1%	<(9.7%)
163	May 20, 2007	<(9.5%)	<(9.7%)
164	May 27, 2007	*6.1%	<(10.0%)
165	June 3, 2007	<(10.0%)	<(10.3%)
166	June 10, 2007	*7.9%	<(10.3%)
Good Sunday Old TV
167	June 17, 2007	7.3%	<(10.4%)
168	June 24, 2007	8.2%	<(11.1%)
169	July 1, 2007	*5.8%	<(11.6%)
170	July 8, 2007	<(10.0%)	<(10.5%)
171	July 15, 2007	*6.1%	<(10.4%)
172	July 22, 2007	*6.9%	<(10.4%)
173	July 29, 2007	10.4%	11.8%
174	August 5, 2007	*5.3%	<(10.8%)
175	August 12, 2007	*6.7%	<(11.6%)
176	August 19, 2007	*9.8%	<(10.3%)
177	August 26, 2007	*8.7%	<(10.3%)
178	September 2, 2007	<(11.2%)	<(11.5%)
179	September 9, 2007	<(9.3%)	<(9.7%)
180	September 16, 2007	*7.5%	<(11.6%)
181	September 23, 2007	<(10.1%)	<(10.6%)
182	September 30, 2007	*7.7%	<(11.6%)
183	October 7, 2007	*8.8%	<(11.1%)
184	October 14, 2007	*5.8%	<(10.9%)
185	October 21, 2007	*6.1%	<(11.5%)
186	October 29, 2006	6.0%	<(10.6%)
187	November 4, 2007	7.4%	<(10.9%)
Explorers of the Human Body + Mission Impossible + Meet the In-Laws
188	November 11, 2007	8.0%	<(10.8%)
189	November 18, 2007	8.7%	<(10.6%)
190	November 26, 2007	8.8%	<(10.9%)
191	December 2, 2007	*8.5%	<(11.1%)
192	December 9, 2007	*8.4%	<(11.4%)
193	December 16, 2007	*8.4%	<(11.6%)
194	December 23, 2007	<(10.8%)	<(10.8%)
195	December 30, 2007	<(10.6%)	<(11.0%)

=== 2008 ===
List of ratings (episode 196–246)
- Ratings by TNS and AGB are shown where available.

Episode #	Original Airdate	TNS Ratings	AGB Ratings	
Episode #	Original Airdate	Nationwide	Nationwide	Seoul National Capital Area
Explorers of the Human Body + Mission Impossible + Meet the In-Laws
196	January 6, 2008	9.4%	<(10.4%)	<(10.7%)
197	January 13, 2008	10.1%	10.5%	<(10.9%)
198	January 20, 2008	8.7%	<(10.1%)	<(10.8%)
199	January 27, 2008	7.9%	<(10.2%)	<(10.5%)
200	February 3, 2008	8.4%	<(10.5%)	<(10.6%)
Mission Impossible 2 + Find Mr. Kim + Meet the In-Laws
201	February 10, 2008	9.6%	<(11.1%)	11.9%
Change + Mission Impossible 2 + Find Mr. Kim
202	February 17, 2008	12.9%	11.3%	12.3%
Change + Find Mr. Kim + Meet the In-Laws
203	February 24, 2008	11.5%	11.3%	12.5%
Mission Impossible 2 + Meet the In-Laws + Change
204	March 2, 2008	9.4%	<(10.8%)	<(11.5%)
205	March 9, 2008	9.8%	9.2%	9.9%
206	March 16, 2008	9.8%	9.3%	<(10.3%)
207	March 23, 2008	10.4%	10.0%	<(11.4%)
208	March 30, 2008	9.2%	<(10.6%)	<(11.4%)
209	April 6, 2008	8.4%	7.4%	<(10.0%)
210	April 13, 2008	8.5%	<(9.5%)	<(9.9%)
211	April 20, 2008	6.7%	<(8.9%)	<(9.7%)
212	April 27, 2008	7.0%	6.6%	<(10.1%)
213	May 4, 2008	7.8%	8.3%	<(9.1%)
214	May 11, 2008	5.6%	<(8.2%)	<(8.5%)
215	May 18, 2008	8.9%	<(9.6%)	<(9.9%)
216	May 25, 2008	6.4%	<(8.9%)	<(9.2%)
217	June 1, 2008	7.1%	6.4%	<(9.5%)
218	June 8, 2008	7.3%	<(10.0%)	<(10.5%)
Meet the In-Laws + Change + Family Outing
219	June 15, 2008	5.5%	5.3%	<(9.4%)
220	June 22, 2008	9.0%	8.2%	<(9.6%)
221	June 29, 2008	8.5%	7.3%	<(10.1%)
222	July 6, 2008	6.3%	5.7%	<(9.8%)
223	July 13, 2008	8.0%	8.5%	<(9.8%)
224	July 20, 2008	10.6%	10.0%	<(10.5%)

- Good Sunday divides its program into two parts, Family Outing as Good Sunday Part 1 and Change as Good Sunday Part 2. Ratings by TNS and AGB are shown where available.

Episode #	Original Airdate	TNS Ratings		AGB Ratings			
Episode #	Original Airdate	Nationwide		Nationwide	Seoul National Capital Area	Nationwide	Seoul National Capital Area
		Part 1 - Family Outing	Part 2 - Change	Part 1 - Family Outing		Part 2 - Change	
225	July 27, 2008	13.4%	5.3%	13.7%	15.4%	5.5%	<(9.9%)
226	August 3, 2008	12.9%	5.9%	14.9%	16.0%	6.4%	<(9.3%)
227	August 17, 2008	21.7%	-	21.6%	23.3%	-	-
228	August 24, 2008	18.3%	7.6%	18.0%	18.7%	<(9.3%)	<(10.2%)
229	August 31, 2008	19.9%	6.8%	20.0%	21.9%	7.0%	<(9.8%)
230	September 7, 2008	16.4%	9.0%	15.3%	16.1%	9.2%	<(9.7%)
231	September 14, 2008	16.3%	5.6%	13.9%	15.3%	<(7.6%)	<(8.2%)
232	September 21, 2008	22.1%	5.1%	21.0%	22.2%	<(9.4%)	<(9.7%)
233	September 28, 2008	20.3%	5.2%	19.5%	20.1%	<(9.2%)	<(9.9%)
234	October 5, 2008	21.3%	6.3%	20.8%	21.9%	<(9.3%)	<(10.0%)
		Part 1 - Family Outing	Part 2 - Gold Miss is Coming	Part 1 - Family Outing		Part 2 - Gold Miss is Coming	
235	October 12, 2008	23.0%	9.3%	21.5%	22.4%	<(9.3%)	<(10.6%)
236	October 19, 2008	23.6%	8.8%	22.0%	22.7%	9.8%	10.3%
237	October 26, 2008	27.5%	8.5%	24.1%	24.5%	8.5%	<(10.2%)
238	November 2, 2008	24.5%	9.4%	23.1%	24.4%	9.1%	<(10.0%)
239	November 9, 2008	29.6%	10.7%	23.3%	23.9%	9.2%	9.9%
240	November 16, 2008	26.4%	6.8%	24.2%	25.0%	<(9.7%)	<(10.1%)
241	November 23, 2008	25.1%	9.5%	23.6%	24.6%	10.2%	11.4%
242	November 30, 2008	26.1%	7.9%	23.0%	24.8%	8.7%	<(10.4%)
243	December 7, 2008	28.0%	9.5%	25.5%	26.7%	10.3%	10.9%
244	December 14, 2008	25.1%	9.1%	22.5%	23.3%	9.7%	<(11.0%)
245	December 21, 2008	29.1%	10.3%	24.4%	25.2%	10.3%	10.7%
246	December 28, 2008	27.7%	8.8%	24.7%	26.0%	<(10.6%)	<(10.7%)

=== 2009 ===
List of ratings (episode 247–296)
- Ratings by TNS and AGB are shown where available.

Episode #	Original Airdate	TNS Ratings		AGB Ratings			
Episode #	Original Airdate	Nationwide		Nationwide	Seoul National Capital Area	Nationwide	Seoul National Capital Area
		Part 1 - Family Outing	Part 2 - Gold Miss is Coming	Part 1 - Family Outing		Part 2 - Gold Miss is Coming	
247	January 4, 2009	27.4%	11.5%	23.7%	24.6%	11.5%	12.1%
248	January 11, 2009	27.7%	13.0%	25.6%	26.4%	12.5%	13.0%
249	January 18, 2009	24.1%	9.3%	23.1%	24.5%	<(9.8%)	<(10.6%)
250	January 25, 2009	17.8%	5.9%	18.0%	19.7%	<(9.7%)	<(10.3%)
251	February 1, 2009	23.3%	9.7%	21.5%	23.2%	<(10.4%)	<(11.0%)
252	February 8, 2009	26.0%	9.6%	21.7%	23.1%	9.3%	<(10.8%)
253	February 15, 2009	23.5%	8.2%	23.1%	25.0%	9.5%	10.8%
254	February 22, 2009	27.2%	9.0%	24.9%	26.1%	<(9.9%)	<(10.2%)
255	March 1, 2009	22.6%	10.3%	21.3%	22.7%	10.2%	10.6%
256	March 8, 2009	24.7%	11.8%	22.1%	23.7%	11.8%	12.3%
257	March 15, 2009	23.9%	11.5%	22.9%	25.6%	11.6%	12.6%
258	March 22, 2009	25.1%	11.4%	21.0%	22.4%	11.4%	12.9%
259	March 29, 2009	23.0%	12.8%	19.9%	20.7%	12.2%	14.0%
260	April 5, 2009	26.3%	9.8%	21.8%	23.0%	9.0%	<(9.4%)
261	April 12, 2009	23.0%	9.1%	18.6%	20.0%	9.6%	10.6%
262	April 19, 2009	23.0%	9.2%	19.4%	21.3%	8.9%	9.9%
263	April 26, 2009	24.3%	9.8%	20.1%	21.2%	9.9%	10.8%
264	May 3, 2009	22.4%	10.7%	18.5%	19.3%	9.0%	9.1%
265	May 10, 2009	24.4%	8.4%	20.4%	22.2%	7.7%	<(8.9%)
266	May 17, 2009	25.9%	10.4%	23.9%	25.8%	<(9.5%)	10.4%
267	May 31, 2009	23.4%	10.1%	18.8%	20.6%	10.3%	11.2%
268	June 7, 2009	25.1%	8.5%	21.1%	23.5%	<(9.2%)	9.6%
269	June 14, 2009	24.3%	15.6%	19.6%	21.5%	13.1%	14.9%
270	June 21, 2009	23.2%	9.3%	18.9%	20.8%	8.9%	9.7%
271	June 28, 2009	24.4%	9.7%	18.5%	20.6%	<(8.6%)	9.2%
272	July 5, 2009	24.7%	9.7%	19.7%	21.3%	<(8.6%)	9.6%
273	July 12, 2009	26.6%	8.9%	21.0%	22.5%	8.1%	<(10.8%)
274	July 19, 2009	20.4%	7.7%	17.5%	18.8%	<(9.1%)	<(9.4%)
275	July 26, 2009	23.7%	8.6%	18.8%	19.3%	<(8.4%)	<(9.1%)
276	August 2, 2009	18.2%	10.3%	14.9%	16.8%	9.1%	10.0%
277	August 9, 2009	21.5%	-	16.7%	18.6%	8.8%	9.5%
278	August 16, 2009	22.7%	9.6%	17.2%	18.9%	9.0%	10.3%
279	August 30, 2009	21.2%	9.2%	17.6%	18.7%	<(9.4%)	9.5%
280	September 6, 2009	22.7%	10.0%	18.6%	20.1%	<(8.3%)	<(8.7%)
281	September 13, 2009	20.4%	9.5%	17.0%	18.6%	8.6%	10.0%
282	September 20, 2009	20.3%	7.7%	18.3%	19.6%	7.1%	<(9.0%)
283	September 27, 2009	22.7%	8.1%	18.6%	20.0%	<(8.4%)	<(8.8%)
284	October 4, 2009	19.3%	9.7%	15.9%	17.0%	9.5%	10.5%
285	October 11, 2009	18.6%	11.2%	16.1%	17.5%	9.5%	10.6%
286	October 18, 2009	21.8%	9.9%	17.2%	18.7%	7.9%	<(8.9%)
287	October 25, 2009	19.7%	10.1%	18.0%	19.7%	10.2%	11.1%
288	November 1, 2009	20.1%	10.4%	17.5%	20.3%	8.6%	9.4%
289	November 8, 2009	21.8%	9.9%	18.8%	20.3%	9.0%	<(9.9%)
290	November 15, 2009	23.1%	10.0%	18.7%	20.1%	7.8%	<(9.9%)
291	November 22, 2009	22.0%	10.0%	17.8%	19.2%	8.0%	<(8.7%)
292	November 29, 2009	22.4%	8.4%	19.3%	21.0%	<(8.6%)	<(9.0%)
293	December 6, 2009	18.5%	8.4%	15.4%	17.3%	7.8%	<(9.5%)
294	December 13, 2009	18.5%	9.0%	15.3%	16.6%	7.9%	<(9.9%)
295	December 20, 2009	19.3%	-	16.6%	17.6%	<(9.5%)	10.5%
296	December 27, 2009	16.8%	-	13.8%	14.8%	8.5%	<(10.7%)

=== 2010 ===
List of ratings (episode 297–342)
- Ratings by TNmS (TNS Media Korea prior to January 27, 2010) and AGB are shown where available.

Episode #	Original Airdate	TNmS Ratings		AGB Ratings			
Episode #	Original Airdate	Nationwide		Nationwide	Seoul National Capital Area	Nationwide	Seoul National Capital Area
		Part 1 - Family Outing	Part 2 - Gold Miss is Coming	Part 1 - Family Outing		Part 2 - Gold Miss is Coming	
297	January 3, 2010	16.4%	9.1%	14.1%	15.5%	8.8%	10.1%
298	January 10, 2010	16.5%	9.3%	13.6%	16.9%	7.9%	<(10.2%)
299	January 17, 2010	17.9%	-	15.3%	16.9%	8.8%	10.0%
300	January 24, 2010	18.0%	7.6%	15.4%	16.7%	<(9.3%)	<(9.6%)
301	January 31, 2010	18.6%	10.8%	14.7%	16.3%	9.2%	10.5%
302	February 7, 2010	16.1%	8.4%	14.1%	15.0%	7.8%	<(10.1%)
303	February 14, 2010	8.7%	-	8.4%	9.1%	4.4%	<(8.1%)
		Part 1 - Family Outing 2	Part 2 - Gold Miss is Coming	Part 1 - Family Outing 2		Part 2 - Gold Miss is Coming	
304	February 21, 2010	17.8%	6.2%	16.5%	18.7%	<(8.6%)	<(9.4%)
305	February 28, 2010	12.4%	5.3%	10.9%	11.7%	5.7%	<(8.7%)
306	March 7, 2010	11.8%	-	10.1%	11.1%	<(9.1%)	<(9.6%)
307	March 14, 2010	9.1%	-	8.6%	9.7%	7.0%	<(9.2%)
308	March 21, 2010	6.1%	-	7.6%	<(9.3%)	6.1%	<(9.3%)
309	March 28, 2010	6.2%	-	7.5%	<(8.9%)	5.6%	<(8.9%)
310	April 11, 2010	5.6%	-	5.6%	<(8.5%)	7.3%	8.5%
311	May 2, 2010	7.2%	-	7.3%	<(8.2%)	6.3%	<(8.2%)
312	May 9, 2010	6.8%	-	6.5%	<(7.7%)	4.4%	<(7.7%)

- Good Sunday airs as a "whole" program during World Cup season.

Episode #	Original Airdate	TNmS Ratings	AGB Ratings	
Episode #	Original Airdate	Nationwide	Nationwide	Seoul National Capital Area
Family Outing 2 + Gold Miss is Coming
313	May 16, 2010	10.6%	10.3%	11.0%
314	May 23, 2010	12.2%	12.5%	14.2%
315	May 30, 2010	6.8%	6.3%	<(8.4%)
316	June 6, 2010	8.2%	8.9%	10.1%
317	June 13, 2010	6.3%	5.7%	<(9.5%)
318	June 27, 2010	10.4%	8.3%	<(8.7%)
319	July 4, 2010	10.7%	8.7%	<(10.5%)

- Good Sunday returns to dividing its program into two parts.

Episode #	Original Airdate	TNmS Ratings			AGB Ratings			
Episode #	Original Airdate	Nationwide	Seoul National Capital Area	Nationwide	Nationwide	Seoul National Capital Area	Nationwide	Seoul National Capital Area
		Part 1 - Running Man		Part 2 - Family Outing 2	Part 1 - Running Man		Part 2 - Family Outing 2	
320	July 11, 2010	12.0%	12.5%	8.1%	10.0%	10.7%	6.7%	<(8.7%)
		Part 1 - Running Man		Part 2 - Heroes	Part 1 - Running Man		Part 2 - Heroes	
321	July 18, 2010	8.1%	9.5%	8.8%	7.8%	8.7%	7.9%	<(9.8%)
322	July 25, 2010	6.7%	7.9%	-	7.4%	8.1%	6.2%	<(9.2%)
323	August 1, 2010	7.8%	8.7%	7.2%	6.3%	7.0%	5.8%	<(9.1%)
324	August 8, 2010	8.0%	9.7%	5.6%	7.3%	8.8%	6.5%	<(8.9%)
325	August 15, 2010	7.6%	6.9%	6.4%	7.8%	8.5%	6.0%	<(8.5%)
326	August 22, 2010	8.4%	7.4%	6.8%	6.6%	7.7%	6.9%	<(8.8%)
327	August 29, 2010	8.4%	9.9%	8.0%	7.9%	8.9%	7.8%	<(10.2%)
328	September 5, 2010	9.3%	8.1%	8.0%	7.4%	8.2%	7.7%	<(9.3%)
329	September 12, 2010	7.8%	7.1%	8.2%	6.6%	7.8%	7.5%	<(8.9%)
330	September 19, 2010	8.2%	8.2%	9.5%	7.0%	8.9%	9.2%	10.3%
331	September 26, 2010	6.7%	6.2%	8.4%	5.6%	6.5%	7.6%	8.6%
332	October 3, 2010	7.0%	8.4%	6.1%	7.1%	8.1%	7.2%	<(9.2%)
333	October 17, 2010	11.1%	11.8%	7.3%	8.8%	8.8%	7.2%	<(8.3%)
334	October 24, 2010	13.2%	14.1%	8.0%	11.1%	11.4%	7.1%	<(8.7%)
335	October 31, 2010	11.0%	11.5%	7.8%	10.3%	11.0%	6.5%	<(8.2%)
336	November 7, 2010	13.2%	14.1%	-	9.8%	10.2%	6.7%	<(8.5%)
337	November 21, 2010	10.3%	10.8%	-	8.9%	9.5%	7.1%	<(9.0%)
338	November 28, 2010	13.2%	14.0%	-	9.3%	9.9%	5.1%	<(9.4%)
339	December 5, 2010	11.8%	12.6%	-	9.3%	9.8%	7.1%	<(9.8%)
340	December 12, 2010	12.7%	13.7%	-	11.2%	12.1%	7.6%	<(9.6%)
341	December 19, 2010	13.2%	14.2%	9.0%	10.6%	11.1%	9.2%	10.1%
342	December 26, 2010	12.6%	13.9%	7.1%	10.7%	11.6%	6.3%	<(10.2%)

=== 2011 ===
List of ratings (episode 343–394)
- Ratings by TNmS and AGB are shown where available.

Episode #	Original Airdate	TNmS Ratings			AGB Ratings			
Episode #	Original Airdate	Nationwide	Seoul National Capital Area	Nationwide	Nationwide	Seoul National Capital Area	Nationwide	Seoul National Capital Area
		Part 1 - Running Man		Part 2 - Heroes	Part 1 - Running Man		Part 2 - Heroes	
343	January 2, 2011	9.7%	12.9%	7.3%	11.1%	12.1%	<(9.8%)	<(10.1%)
344	January 9, 2011	11.7%	15.7%	-	10.9%	11.7%	7.1%	<(10.0%)
345	January 16, 2011	11.8%	14.4%	-	11.5%	12.0%	6.5%	<(10.7%)
346	January 23, 2011	12.6%	15.8%	-	13.2%	14.5%	6.0%	<(10.7%)
347	January 30, 2011	13.7%	17.5%	-	14.9%	16.3%	4.9%	<(10.7%)
348	February 6, 2011	13.1%	16.6%	-	15.0%	16.2%	8.0%	<(10.5%)
349	February 13, 2011	10.4%	12.5%	-	10.7%	11.4%	7.4%	<(10.1%)
350	February 20, 2011	11.2%	13.7%	-	12.6%	13.4%	6.9%	<(9.8%)
351	February 27, 2011	11.2%	13.7%	6.5%	12.8%	13.7%	7.4%	<(10.0%)
352	March 6, 2011	10.4%	13.1%	7.1%	11.2%	12.0%	8.6%	<(10.0%)
353	March 13, 2011	8.3%	10.7%	7.1%	10.1%	11.2%	5.3%	<(9.6%)
354	March 20, 2011	8.7%	10.4%	5.7%	9.9%	10.6%	7.6%	<(9.8%)
355	March 27, 2011	9.6%	11.7%	5.3%	11.2%	12.3%	5.1%	<(9.8%)
356	April 3, 2011	10.5%	12.9%	-	11.7%	12.5%	5.3%	<(8.8%)
357	April 10, 2011	10.2%	13.4%	5.8%	11.1%	12.5%	5.8%	<(8.4%)
358	April 17, 2011	9.5%	12.6%	-	10.8%	12.4%	6.3%	<(8.4%)
359	April 24, 2011	9.6%	12.4%	5.1%	10.7%	11.2%	5.8%	<(8.5%)
360	May 1, 2011	8.0%	9.7%	5.9%	9.8%	10.8%	6.5%	<(8.9%)

- Good Sunday returns to airing as one "whole" program.

Episode #	Original Airdate	TNmS Ratings		AGB Ratings	
Episode #	Original Airdate	Nationwide	Seoul National Capital Area	Nationwide	Seoul National Capital Area
Running Man
361	May 8, 2011	8.0%	9.9%	7.7%	8.1%
362	May 15, 2011	9.1%	11.9%	9.6%	10.0%
Running Man + Kiss & Cry
363	May 22, 2011	8.1%	10.2%	9.1%	10.5%
364	May 29, 2011	6.9%	9.2%	7.1%	<(8.3%)
365	June 5, 2011	5.5%	<(7.6%)	6.2%	<(7.7%)
366	June 12, 2011	7.1%	<(9.0%)	8.4%	9.6%
367	June 19, 2011	7.6%	10.0%	7.3%	<(9.2%)
368	June 26, 2011	9.3%	12.1%	9.8%	10.6%
369	July 3, 2011	10.3%	13.0%	11.7%	12.9%
370	July 10, 2011	9.8%	12.0%	9.9%	10.7%
371	July 17, 2011	10.5%	12.4%	10.8%	11.6%
372	July 24, 2011	11.1%	13.3%	11.6%	12.8%
373	July 31, 2011	9.3%	11.5%	10.3%	12.2%
374	August 7, 2011	12.0%	14.8%	12.0%	12.6%
375	August 14, 2011	11.4%	15.0%	11.9%	13.7%
376	August 21, 2011	9.8%	12.1%	10.8%	12.3%
Running Man + BIGsTORY
377	August 28, 2011	8.2%	10.0%	9.5%	10.7%
378	September 4, 2011	9.4%	11.4%	9.1%	9.9%
379	September 11, 2011	8.4%	9.8%	8.2%	9.0%
380	September 18, 2011	10.7%	12.1%	10.6%	10.9%

- Good Sunday returns to dividing its program into two parts.

Episode #	Original Airdate	TNmS Ratings			AGB Ratings			
Episode #	Original Airdate	Nationwide	Seoul National Capital Area	Nationwide	Nationwide	Seoul National Capital Area	Nationwide	Seoul National Capital Area
		Part 1 - Running Man		Part 2 - BIGsTORY	Part 1 - Running Man		Part 2 - BIGsTORY	
381	September 25, 2011	14.3%	18.5%	-	14.3%	15.5%	3.2%	<(9.3%)
382	October 2, 2011	13.0%	16.0%	3.6%	13.8%	15.0%	3.7%	<(8.4%)
383	October 9, 2011	13.0%	14.2%	-	13.7%	14.0%	3.6%	<(9.5%)
384	October 16, 2011	-	-	-	-	-	4.9%	<(9.0%)
385	October 23, 2011	13.5%	16.8%	-	14.6%	15.1%	4.2%	<(9.3%)
386	October 30, 2011	15.5%	17.5%	-	14.5%	14.9%	3.0%	<(8.8%)
387	November 6, 2011	15.3%	18.3%	5.8%	15.8%	16.8%	5.2%	<(9.7%)
388	November 13, 2011	16.0%	19.4%	-	15.7%	16.9%	4.7%	<(9.4%)
389	November 20, 2011	15.0%	17.1%	-	16.9%	18.2%	5.2%	<(9.1%)
390	November 27, 2011	16.5%	19.8%	-	18.0%	19.8%	7.1%	<(10.0%)

- Good Sunday returns to airing as one "whole" program.

Episode #	Original Airdate	TNmS Ratings		AGB Ratings	
Episode #	Original Airdate	Nationwide	Seoul National Capital Area	Nationwide	Seoul National Capital Area
Running Man + K-pop Star
391	December 4, 2011	12.1%	15.0%	12.1%	13.5%
392	December 11, 2011	13.7%	17.0%	13.9%	15.1%
393	December 18, 2011	12.6%	14.3%	14.2%	15.4%
394	December 25, 2011	12.9%	15.0%	13.5%	14.1%

=== 2012 ===
List of ratings (episode 395–446)

Episode #	Original Airdate	TNmS Ratings		AGB Ratings	
Episode #	Original Airdate	Nationwide	Seoul National Capital Area	Nationwide	Seoul National Capital Area
Running Man + K-pop Star
395	January 1, 2012	13.9%	16.8%	13.9%	15.7%
396	January 8, 2012	13.7%	16.1%	13.9%	15.4%
397	January 15, 2012	13.9%	16.6%	15.5%	17.4%
398	January 22, 2012	9.7%	9.9%	12.5%	14.1%
399	January 29, 2012	11.9%	13.2%	14.9%	17.1%
400	February 5, 2012	15.2%	17.0%	15.4%	17.0%
401	February 12, 2012	14.3%	16.4%	14.9%	16.8%
402	February 19, 2012	16.5%	20.5%	15.9%	17.6%
403	February 26, 2012	16.4%	19.5%	16.6%	19.2%
404	March 4, 2012	16.1%	20.1%	15.8%	18.3%
405	March 11, 2012	15.4%	19.6%	15.8%	17.8%
406	March 18, 2012	14.5%	18.3%	15.2%	16.8%
407	March 25, 2012	15.7%	19.0%	15.7%	17.8%
408	April 1, 2012	17.6%	21.6%	16.8%	18.9%
409	April 8, 2012	15.7%	20.4%	15.3%	17.4%
410	April 15, 2012	13.7%	16.5%	13.8%	15.4%
411	April 22, 2012	16.4%	20.8%	17.1%	19.8%
412	April 29, 2012	14.9%	17.6%	14.9%	16.4%
Law of the Jungle 2 + Running Man
413	May 6, 2012	15.0%	17.9%	14.7%	17.4%
414	May 13, 2012	15.0%	18.3%	14.9%	16.9%
415	May 20, 2012	16.5%	20.6%	17.0%	19.9%
416	May 27, 2012	16.3%	20.2%	16.1%	18.5%
417	June 3, 2012	18.8%	24.3%	17.6%	20.1%
418	June 10, 2012	16.5%	20.4%	15.5%	17.4%
419	June 17, 2012	16.0%	18.3%	15.5%	17.7%
420	June 24, 2012	18.5%	22.0%	15.5%	16.9%
421	July 1, 2012	17.5%	20.0%	15.6%	17.2%
422	July 8, 2012	19.1%	22.1%	17.3%	19.4%
423	July 15, 2012	21.4%	24.0%	18.1%	20.2%
424	July 22, 2012	19.6%	22.4%	17.1%	18.6%
425	August 5, 2012	15.3%	16.8%	14.7%	16.0%
426	August 12, 2012	19.4%	22.2%	16.8%	19.0%
427	August 19, 2012	19.5%	23.3%	16.9%	18.6%
428	August 26, 2012	17.7%	20.5%	14.2%	15.7%
429	September 2, 2012	20.2%	22.0%	17.3%	18.6%
430	September 9, 2012	19.5%	21.3%	17.1%	18.6%
431	September 16, 2012	19.2%	20.8%	17.2%	18.2%
432	September 23, 2012	17.2%	18.9%	15.2%	16.2%
433	September 30, 2012	16.4%	17.1%	14.3%	15.8%
434	October 7, 2012	17.4%	18.6%	15.5%	16.6%
435	October 14, 2012	19.5%	21.9%	17.6%	19.2%
436	October 21, 2012	18.6%	20.3%	16.5%	17.4%
437	October 28, 2012	19.1%	21.4%	17.0%	18.4%
438	November 4, 2012	19.9%	21.8%	17.2%	18.4%
439	November 11, 2012	20.9%	22.5%	17.6%	19.2%
K-pop Star 2 + Running Man
440	November 18, 2012	18.3%	19.7%	16.6%	17.8%
441	November 25, 2012	18.2%	19.3%	15.0%	16.1%
442	December 2, 2012	16.9%	18.4%	14.6%	16.0%
443	December 9, 2012	19.3%	22.2%	16.6%	17.9%
444	December 16, 2012	19.0%	21.3%	15.6%	16.7%
445	December 23, 2012	17.7%	19.6%	15.1%	16.7%
446	December 30, 2012	18.4%	20.4%	15.1%	16.8%

=== 2013 ===
List of ratings (episode 447–498)

Episode #	Original Airdate	TNmS Ratings		AGB Ratings	
Episode #	Original Airdate	Nationwide	Seoul National Capital Area	Nationwide	Seoul National Capital Area
K-pop Star 2 + Running Man
447	January 6, 2013	17.4%	19.2%	16.3%	18.3%
448	January 13, 2013	17.8%	19.7%	16.0%	17.9%
449	January 20, 2013	17.2%	19.2%	15.5%	17.5%
450	January 27, 2013	17.4%	18.8%	15.9%	17.7%
451	February 3, 2013	18.3%	20.6%	16.3%	17.9%
452	February 10, 2013	12.9%	13.8%	11.7%	12.8%
453	February 17, 2013	18.0%	19.5%	16.7%	18.0%
454	February 24, 2013	15.2%	16.5%	13.7%	14.9%
455	March 3, 2013	15.3%	17.3%	14.1%	15.6%
456	March 10, 2013	15.4%	17.1%	15.4%	17.4%
457	March 17, 2013	15.1%	16.9%	14.3%	16.1%
458	March 24, 2013	15.2%	17.1%	14.6%	16.0%
459	March 31, 2013	14.3%	16.0%	14.6%	16.7%
460	April 7, 2013	14.3%	16.1%	13.7%	15.7%
461	April 14, 2013	12.5%	13.6%	13.0%	14.1%
Barefooted Friends + Running Man
462	April 21, 2013	9.9%	10.3%	11.3%	12.3%
463	April 28, 2013	9.4%	10.4%	9.9%	11.1%
464	May 5, 2013	7.6%	8.4%	8.1%	8.7%
465	May 12, 2013	8.8%	9.0%	9.8%	10.5%
466	May 19, 2013	7.9%	8.1%	9.4%	10.1%
467	May 26, 2013	9.2%	9.6%	11.4%	13.3%
468	June 2, 2013	9.0%	9.3%	9.3%	10.1%
469	June 9, 2013	8.6%	8.8%	9.0%	9.9%
470	June 16, 2013	7.5%	8.1%	7.9%	8.2%
471	June 23, 2013	8.6%	8.9%	9.0%	9.8%
472	June 30, 2013	9.2%	10.2%	9.2%	9.9%
473	July 7, 2013	9.5%	9.7%	10.5%	11.3%
474	July 14, 2013	11.3%	12.9%	10.8%	11.8%
475	July 21, 2013	9.5%	10.1%	9.2%	10.3%
476	July 28, 2013	9.4%	10.4%	9.6%	10.7%
477	August 4, 2013	8.6%	9.2%	6.6%	<(7.6%)
478	August 11, 2013	7.5%	8.3%	7.5%	7.6%
479	August 18, 2013	8.8%	10.0%	9.2%	10.1%
480	August 25, 2013	9.2%	9.8%	9.0%	9.2%
481	September 1, 2013	8.2%	8.9%	8.5%	8.9%
482	September 8, 2013	8.5%	9.1%	9.6%	10.2%
483	September 15, 2013	8.3%	9.4%	8.5%	9.2%
484	September 22, 2013	8.9%	9.2%	9.8%	9.8%
485	September 29, 2013	8.7%	9.5%	9.6%	9.7%
486	October 6, 2013	9.1%	9.8%	9.3%	9.7%
487	October 13, 2013	8.0%	8.8%	8.3%	8.9%
488	October 20, 2013	8.6%	10.2%	8.9%	9.4%
489	October 27, 2013	8.6%	9.7%	9.7%	10.6%
490	November 3, 2013	8.5%	9.9%	8.6%	8.8%
491	November 10, 2013	8.3%	9.3%	9.6%	10.4%
492	November 17, 2013	8.7%	9.4%	9.0%	9.5%
K-pop Star 3 + Running Man
493	November 24, 2013	10.9%	12.5%	11.0%	12.1%
494	December 1, 2013	10.4%	12.1%	10.7%	11.7%
495	December 8, 2013	10.3%	12.2%	11.3%	12.8%
496	December 15, 2013	10.5%	12.1%	11.6%	12.6%
497	December 22, 2013	10.4%	12.2%	10.5%	11.2%
498	December 29, 2013	10.0%	11.6%	11.8%	13.3%

=== 2014 ===
List of ratings (episode 499–548)

Episode #	Original Airdate	TNmS Ratings		AGB Ratings	
Episode #	Original Airdate	Nationwide	Seoul National Capital Area	Nationwide	Seoul National Capital Area
K-pop Star 3 + Running Man
499	January 5, 2014	11.9%	13.7%	12.8%	14.1%
500	January 12, 2014	11.1%	12.9%	13.0%	14.7%
501	January 19, 2014	11.0%	12.9%	11.4%	12.3%
502	January 26, 2014	12.6%	14.2%	13.8%	15.7%
503	February 2, 2014	12.0%	14.8%	12.1%	13.1%
504	February 9, 2014	12.5%	14.5%	13.3%	14.3%
505	February 16, 2014	11.2%	12.9%	11.6%	12.5%
506	February 23, 2014	10.9%	12.5%	11.4%	12.7%
507	March 2, 2014	9.4%	11.1%	11.2%	12.7%
508	March 9, 2014	10.6%	12.1%	11.2%	12.7%
509	March 16, 2014	9.4%	11.3%	10.6%	11.5%
510	March 23, 2014	9.8%	11.9%	11.9%	13.6%
511	March 30, 2014	8.9%	10.6%	10.0%	11.2%
512	April 6, 2014	10.4%	12.5%	10.8%	12.1%
513	April 13, 2014	10.0%	12.1%	10.3%	11.2%
Roommate + Running Man
514	May 4, 2014	7.8%	8.7%	7.0%	7.7%
515	May 11, 2014	9.1%	11.2%	8.5%	9.6%
516	May 18, 2014	7.3%	8.7%	7.1%	8.1%
517	May 25, 2014	8.8%	10.9%	8.0%	8.8%
518	June 1, 2014	8.8%	10.1%	8.0%	8.9%
519	June 8, 2014	9.3%	11.4%	8.8%	10.1%
520	June 15, 2014	7.9%	9.7%	7.2%	8.1%
521	June 22, 2014	7.9%	9.2%	6.4%	<(7.4%)
522	June 29, 2014	7.8%	8.9%	7.4%	8.3%
523	July 6, 2014	7.2%	8.0%	6.5%	<(7.2%)
524	July 13, 2014	7.2%	8.1%	6.3%	<(7.3%)
525	July 20, 2014	7.8%	8.9%	6.8%	<(8.0%)
526	July 27, 2014	6.9%	8.7%	5.7%	<(6.8%)
527	August 3, 2014	<(7.6%)	8.0%	7.2%	7.5%
528	August 10, 2014	6.8%	8.1%	6.5%	7.3%
529	August 17, 2014	7.7%	9.5%	7.2%	8.0%
530	August 24, 2014	7.2%	7.9%	6.4%	<(6.9%)
531	August 31, 2014	6.7%	8.0%	6.7%	7.3%
532	September 7, 2014	<(6.4%)	<(7.1%)	4.8%	<(6.4%)
Roommate
533	September 14, 2014	<(6.8%)	<(7.0%)	4.2%	<(7.1%)
Roommate + Running Man
534	September 21, 2014	6.4%	8.1%	6.4%	<(7.2%)
Running Man
535	September 28, 2014	7.6%	9.7%	7.2%	7.8%
Roommate + Running Man
536	October 5, 2014	6.7%	7.5%	7.4%	8.2%
537	October 12, 2014	6.8%	8.1%	7.0%	7.5%
538	October 19, 2014	9.1%	11.1%	9.7%	10.8%
539	October 26, 2014	7.3%	8.4%	7.0%	8.2%
540	November 2, 2014	7.5%	8.9%	7.9%	8.4%
541	November 9, 2014	6.8%	8.4%	7.1%	8.0%
542	November 16, 2014	7.5%	8.7%	7.2%	7.9%
K-pop Star 4 + Running Man
543	November 23, 2014	9.6%	11.6%	9.9%	10.7%
544	November 30, 2014	10.9%	13.4%	10.9%	11.8%
545	December 7, 2014	11.1%	14.6%	11.6%	12.9%
546	December 14, 2014	10.7%	13.4%	11.7%	13.4%
547	December 21, 2014	9.9%	11.8%	10.8%	11.8%
548	December 28, 2014	10.7%	13.5%	11.7%	12.1%

=== 2015-present ===
List of ratings (episode 549–present)

Episode #	Original Airdate	TNmS Ratings		AGB Ratings	
Episode #	Original Airdate	Nationwide	Seoul National Capital Area	Nationwide	Seoul National Capital Area
K-pop Star 4 + Running Man
549	January 4, 2015	13.1%	16.2%	14.9%	16.7%
550	January 11, 2015	11.7%	14.2%	13.0%	14.5%
551	January 18, 2015	10.8%	13.3%	10.8%	11.8%
552	January 25, 2015	10.2%	12.6%	12.0%	13.5%
553	February 1, 2015	10.2%	12.8%	11.8%	13.1%
554	February 8, 2015	9.8%	12.2%	11.7%	13.2%
555	February 15, 2015	10.1%	12.0%	11.5%	12.5%
556	February 22, 2015	10.2%	11.9%	11.9%	13.6%
557	March 1, 2015	9.9%	12.2%	11.1%	12.7%
558	March 8, 2015	10.3%	12.8%	11.6%	13.1%
559	March 15, 2015	9.9%	12.1%	10.7%	11.4%
560	March 22, 2015	9.4%	12.0%	10.0%	11.1%
561	March 29, 2015	9.8%	11.3%	10.4%	12.0%
562	April 5, 2015	9.3%	10.3%	10.0%	11.1%
563	April 12, 2015	10.0%	11.5%	10.2%	11.6%
564	April 19, 2015	7.5%	8.6%	7.2%	7.7%

== Awards and achievements ==
Year	Awards
2007	2007 SBS Entertainment Awards (December 30); Korean Wave Program Award – X-man; Most Talented Entertainer Award – Haha (Good Sunday Old TV); Grand Award (Daesang) – Kang Ho-dong (X-man)
2008	2008 SBS Entertainment Awards (December 30); Newbie Award: Entertainment Category – Yang Jung-a (Gold Miss is Coming); Producer's Entertainer Award – Kim Su-ro (Family Outing), Jang Yun-jung (Gold Miss is Coming); Special Award: Broadcast Writer Category – Lee Mi-sun (Writer of Family Outing); Best Teamwork Award – Gold Miss is Coming team; Netizen Most Popular Award – Lee Chun-hee, Park Ye-jin (Family Outing); Audience's Best Program Award – Family Outing; Grand Award (Daesang) – Yoo Jae-suk (Family Outing)
2009	2009 SBS Entertainment Awards (December 30); Best Screenwriter – Choi Mun-kyung (Gold Miss is Coming); Producer's TV Star Award – Yang Jung-a (Gold Miss is Coming); Netizen Most Popular Award – Lee Hyo-ri (Family Outing); Best Teamwork Award – Family Outing team; Outstanding Award: Entertainment Category – Shin Bong-sun (Gold Miss is Coming); Grand Award (Daesang) – Yoo Jae-suk & Lee Hyo-ri (Family Outing)
2010	2010 SBS Entertainment Awards (December 30); SBS Variety New Star Award – Song Joong-ki, Lee Kwang-soo & Gary (Running Man), Kahi & IU (Heroes); Variety Special Award – Song Ji-hyo (Running Man); Best TV Star Award – Kim Jong-kook (Running Man), Shin Bong-sun (Heroes); Best Teamwork Award – Heroes team; Netizen Most Popular Program – Running Man
2011	2011 SBS Entertainment Awards (December 30); Newbie Award: Variety Category – Lee Kwang-soo (Running Man); Broadcast Writer Award – Park Hyun-sook (Running Man); Special Award – Kim Yuna (Kiss & Cry); Best Entertainer Award: Variety Category – Haha (Running Man) & Park Jun-geum (Kiss & Cry); Most Outstanding Program – Running Man; Outstanding Award: Variety Category – Kim Jong-kook & Song Ji-hyo (Running Man); Most Outstanding Award: Variety Category – Kim Byung-man (Kiss & Cry); Grand Award (Daesang) – Yoo Jae-suk (Running Man)
2012	2012 SBS Entertainment Awards (December 30); Best Entertainer Award – Variety Category – Chu Sung-hoon & Jeon Hye-bin (Law of the Jungle); Producer Award – Yoon Do-hyun (K-pop Star, Law of the Jungle); Outstanding Award: Variety Category – Gary & Ji Suk-jin (Running Man); Outstanding Program – K-pop Star; Most Outstanding Program – Law of the Jungle; Viewer's Most Popular Program – Running Man; Viewer's Most Popular Award – Yoo Jae-suk (Running Man); Most Outstanding Award: Variety Category – Kim Byung-man (Law of the Jungle); Special Award – BoA (K-pop Star); Grand Award (Daesang) – Yoo Jae-suk (Running Man)
2013	2013 SBS Entertainment Awards (December 30); Friendship Award – Lee Kwang-soo (Running Man); Producer Award – Kang Ho-dong (Barefooted Friends); Male Outstanding Award – Haha & Kim Jong-kook (Running Man); Outstanding Program: Variety Category – K-pop Star; Most Outstanding Program – Running Man; Viewer's Most Popular Award – Running Man members; Female Most Outstanding Award – Song Ji-hyo (Running Man)
2014	2014 SBS Entertainment Awards (December 30); Variety Show Male Newcomer Award – Jackson(Roommate); Variety Show Female Newcomer Award – Bae Jong-ok (Roommate); SBS Variety New Star Award – Jo Se-ho & Lee Guk-joo (Roommate); Viewer's Choice Award – Yoo Jae-suk (Running Man); Male Outstanding Award – Lee Kwang-soo (Running Man); Outstanding Program: Variety Category – K-pop Star; Male Most Outstanding Award – Kim Jong-kook (Running Man); Viewer's Choice: Best Variety Show – Running Man; Special Award – Yoo Hee-yeol (K-pop Star)

== See also ==
- KBS2 Happy Sunday
- MBC Sunday Night
