= Real Situation Saturday =

South Korean television series

- Hangul: 실제상황! 토요일
- Hanja: 實際狀況! 土曜日
- RR: Silje sanghwang! Toyoil
- MR: Silche sanghwang! T'oyoil
- Genre: Reality television Comedy
- Starring: Kang Ho-dong; Shin Dong-yup
- Country of origin: South Korea
- Original language: Korean
- No. of episodes: 154

Production
- Running time: Approx. 130 min

Original release
- Network: SBS
- Release: November 8, 2003 – January 5, 2007

Related
- Good Sunday

Real Situation Saturday (Korean: 실제상황! 토요일) is a Korean variety show shown on the SBS network. Many popular programs have aired on this Saturday line-up, including X-Man and Real Romance Love Letter, dominating Saturday evening ratings for a long time. It began to air for 60 mins from November 8, 2003 to July 2, 2005, later expanded to 130 mins from July 9, 2005 to October 28, 2006, and cut back to 70 mins from November 4, 2006 to January 6, 2007 and ended its run because it suffered competition from Infinite Challenge.

== Season 1 segment ==
=== X-Man ===
- Aired: November 8, 2003 – October 9, 2004 (Moved to Good Sunday)
- Starring: Kang Ho-dong, Yoo Jae-suk, Kim Je-dong

Real Situation Finding X-Man (실제상황 X맨을 찾아라) was that program that began Real Situation Saturday. It later moved to Good Sunday to revive that line-up and to make way for Love Letter.

== Season 2 segments ==
=== Real Romance Love Letter ===
- Aired: October 16, 2004 – October 28, 2006
- Seasons: 3
- Starring: Kang Ho-dong

Real Romance Love Letter (리얼 로망스 연애편지) was a programme featuring male and female contestants competing for "each other".

=== Our Children Have Changed ===
- Aired: July 9, 2005 – October 28, 2006 (in Real Situation Saturday. Airs today as stand-alone program.)
- Starring: Shin Dong-yup

Our Children Have Changed (우리 아이가 달라졌어요) is a program about the difficulties of raising children. The predecessor is Shin Dong-yup's Love's Commissioned Mother.

=== Super Junior's Full House ===
- Aired: May 27, 2006 – August 12, 2006
- Starring: Shin Dong-yup, Super Junior

Super Junior's Full House (슈퍼주니어의 풀하우스) was a program where the group, Super Junior, would host 2 foreigners as they stayed in South Korea. The show presents comedic experiences between the South Korean boy band Super Junior and two female international students, who did a homestay with Super Junior for a month.

=== My Love, Monkey ===
- Aired: September 2, 2006 – October 28, 2006
- Starring: Ayumi, Jung Jae-yong

My Love, Monkey (내사랑 몽키) was a program about raising monkeys.

== Season 3 segment ==
=== Love Choice ===
- Aired: November 4, 2006 – January 6, 2007
- Starring: Kim Yong-man

Love Choice (선택남녀) was a program where male celebrities would attempt to date regular women. It was part of the short-lived 70 mins Real Situation Saturday and Good Sunday weekend.
