= Shin Bong-sun =

South Korean comedian (born 1980)

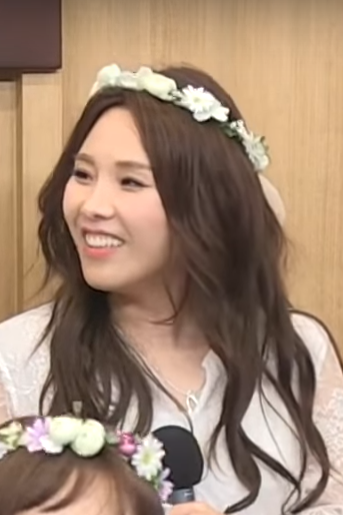
- Shin in August 2019
- Born: October 6, 1980 (age 46); Seo District, Busan, South Korea

Comedy career
- Years active: 2005–present
- Medium: Stand-up, television
- Genres: Observational, sketch, wit, parody, slapstick, dramatic, sitcom
- Musical career
- Genres: K-pop; dance
- Instrument: Vocals
- Years active: 2018-present
- Member of: Celeb Five

Korean name
- Hangul: 신봉선
- Hanja: 申奉仙
- RR: Sin Bongseon
- MR: Sin Pongsŏn

Shin Bong-sun (Korean: 신봉선; born October 6, 1980) is a South Korean comedienne and entertainer. She took a five-year hiatus from comedy from 2010 to 2015, which ended when she joined Comedy Big League. She is currently a member of the South Korean girl group Celeb Five.

== Television series ==
- MasterChef Korea Celebrity
- Happy Together Season 3
- Heroes
- Family Outing 2
- Infinite Girls
- Secret
- Exploration of Genders
- BIGsTORY
- Gold Miss is Coming
- Change
- Gag Concert
- Reply 1997
- Kim Jung-eun's Chocolate
- The Thousandth Man (cameo)
- King of Mask Singer (fixed panelist, contestant ep 87)
- Idol Maid
- Sweet Revenge 2 (cameo)
- Blindly Commerce (2021, Host)
- Song-eun's Manga Comeback tvN D Studio (STUDIO) with Song Eun-i
- Goal Girls (Cast Member, 2021)
- Goal Girls 2 (Cast Member, 2021)
- Marriage Is Crazy (2021) - Host
- Curling Queens (2022) - Host / MBC Lunar New Year special pilot
- Chart Sisters (2022); Host with Celeb Five Member
- Groom's Class (2022); Cast

=== Web shows ===
Year	Title	Role	Notes	Ref.
2022	Celeb Five : Behind the Curtain	Cast Member	with Celeb Five Member	

=== Radio shows ===
Year	Title	Role	Ref.
2022	This is Ahn Young-mi, the date muse at two o'clock	Special DJ	

== Awards and nominations ==
Year	Award	Category	Nominated work	Result
2005	KBS Entertainment Awards	Best Newcomer Award		Won
2007	KBS Entertainment Awards	Excellence Award		Won
2008	KBS Entertainment Awards	Excellence Award in MC		Won
2008	44th Baeksang Arts Awards	Best Female TV Personality in Variety	Happy Together season 3	Won
2009	KBS Entertainment Awards	Excellence Award in Variety		Won
2009	SBS Entertainment Awards	Outstanding Entertainment Award	Good Sunday	Won
2010	SBS Entertainment Awards	Best TV Star Award	Heroes	Won
2011	SBS Entertainment Awards	Netizen Popularity Award	Bigstory	Nominated
2015	MBC Entertainment Awards	Special Award	King of Mask Singer	Won
2020	19th MBC Entertainment Awards	Top Excellence Award in Music/ Talk	King of Mask Singer	Nominated
2021	20th MBC Entertainment Awards	Top Excellence Award in Variety	Hangout with Yoo / King of Mask Singer	Won
2022	Korean PD Awards	Best Comedian	Hangout with Yoo	Won
