= Kim Shin-young =

South Korean comedian (born 1983)

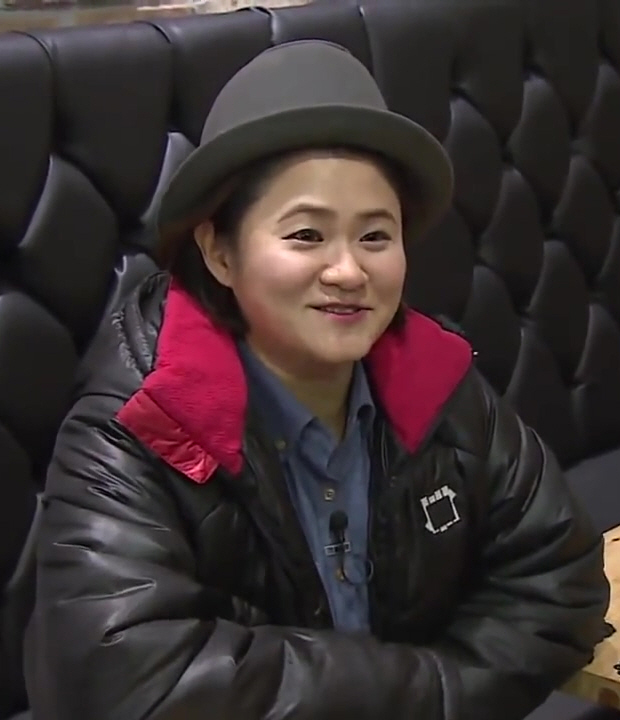
- Kim in 2016
- Born: December 20, 1983 (age 42); Daegu, South Korea
- Agent: C-JeS Studios
- Notable work: People Looking For Laughter; Quiz to Change the World; Invincible Youth; Show Champion; Kim Shin Young's Noon Song of Hope

Comedy career
- Years active: 2004–present
- Genre: Comedy
- Musical career
- Genres: K-pop; Dance; Trot
- Instrument: Vocals
- Years active: 2018–present

Korean name
- Hangul: 김신영
- Hanja: 金信英
- RR: Gim Sinyeong
- MR: Kim Sinyŏng

Kim Shin-young (Korean: 김신영; born December 20, 1983) is a South Korean comedian, MC and DJ. She debuted in 2004 on the SBS show People Looking For Laughter and won 'Best Variety Performer' at the 42nd Baeksang Arts Awards in 2006. She has hosted numerous variety shows and radio shows in South Korea and has won several awards for comedy and hosting in her career. In 2018, Kim became a member of Celeb Five (셀럽파이브), a dance group produced by CONTENTS LAB VIVO, a contents company owned by Song Eun-i.

== Early life and education ==
Kim Shin-young was born in Daegu, South Korea, on December 20, 1983. She learned judo and dreamed of living in the Korea National Training Center for athletes before becoming interested in comedy. In 2002, she enrolled in the Comedy Acting Department at Yewon Arts University.

== Career ==
=== 2004–2008: Debut ===
Kim Shin-young first appeared on SBS People Looking For Laughter in 2004 and gained recognition by hosting various variety shows for years. She made her film debut as Cha Tae-hyun's sister in the 2005 film My Girl and I. In 2006, Kim won 'Best Variety Performer' at the 42nd Baeksang Arts Awards for People Looking For Laughter. In 2007, Kim became an MC of MBC's Infinite Girls, an all-female version of the show Infinite Challenge. She was a part of the show until its 3rd season which aired in 2013. The next year, Kim hosted MBC's Stop the Boring Time Radio with Super Junior's Shindong. She won the "Radio Rookie Award" at the 2008 MBC Drama Awards.

=== 2009–present ===
In 2009, Kim was paired with actor Shin Sung-rok as a virtually married couple on MBC's We Got Married. They were one of the three new couples introduced in January. Kim also became a host of KBS' Challenge Golden Ladder. She then became a regular cast member of MBC's Quiz to Change the World and became a host of KBS' Sang Sang Plus. Kim also hosted Girls' Generation's variety show Girls' Generation's Horror Movie Factory, which lasted for 6 episodes. In October, she became one of the hosts of Invincible Youth alongside Roh Joo-hyun and Kim Tae-woo. The show featured 7 girl group members (known as G7) who experienced farm life in Yuchi-ri, a village in Hongcheon County, Gangwon Province . On December 26, she won the "Best Newcomer Award" at the 8th KBS Entertainment Awards. Kim started hosting the KBS idol talk-show Win Win alongside Kim Seung-woo, Choi Hwa-jung, 2PM's Wooyoung and Girls' Generation's Taeyeon in 2010. She also hosted MBC's God of Cookery Expedition and appeared in the thriller film, Midnight FM. On December 29, she won the "Excellence Award in a Variety Show" at the 2010 MBC Entertainment Awards for Quiz to Change the World.

Kim hosted KBS' 100 Points Out of 100 in February 2011. In the same year, she joined MBC's singing competition show I Am a Singer, where she was one of seven entertainers who acted as 'managers' (i.e. mentors) for the contestants. On December 29, she won the "Friendship Award" for Quiz to Change the World at the 2011 MBC Entertainment Awards.

In 2012, Kim returned as a host of Invincible Youth for its second season. She also became an MC for MBC's music show Show Champion with Super Junior's Shindong from February 14 to December 25, but returned as its sole host in 2015. Kim currently hosts the MBC FM4U radio show Kim Shin Young's Noon Song of Hope. On December 29, 2013, she won the "Radio Top Excellence Award" at the 2013 MBC Entertainment Awards.

On May 1, 2020, Kim released her trot singer debut as Second Aunt KimDaVi, the single titled "Gimme Gimme". In 2022, she had a role in the romantic mystery film Decision to Leave, directed by Park Chan-wook.

In December 2022, Kim terminated her contract with Media Lab Seesaw. In April 2023, Kim signed with C-JeS Studios.

== Filmography ==
=== Variety shows ===
Year	Title	Network	Notes/Ref.
2004–2007	People Looking For Laughter	SBS	
2007–2013	Infinite Girls	MBC	MC
2008	Come To Play	MBC	
2009	Quiz to Change the World	MBC	
2009	We Got Married (Season 1)	MBC	Couple with Shin Sung-rok
2009	Challenge! Golden Ladder	KBS	MC
2009	Girls' Generation's Horror Movie Factory	MBC	MC
2009–2010	Sang Sang Plus	KBS	MC
2009–2010	God of Cookery Expedition	MBC	MC
2009–2010	Invincible Youth	KBS	MC
2010	Win Win	KBS	MC
2011	100 Points Out of 100	KBS	MC
2011–2012	I Am a Singer	MBC	Manager
2012	Invincible Youth (Season 2)	KBS	Co-Host
2012; 2015–2019	Show Champion	MBC Music	MC (Co-host with Shindong in 2012)
2014	God of the Dining Table	KBS2	
August 7, 2014 – October 1, 2015	Happy Together season 3	KBS2	Co-host with Yoo Jae-suk, Park Myeong-su, Park Mi-sun and Jo Se-ho
2017	Living Together in Empty Room	MBC	Cast member with Hong Jin-young and Block B's P. O (Pilot, Episodes 1–5)
2018	Weekly Idol	MBC Every 1	Co-host with Yoo Se Yoon and Lee Sang-Min
2018–2019	Cool Kids	JTBC	Co-host with Yoo Jae-suk, Ahn Jung-hwan, Kwanghee and Haon
2019	Why Did You Come To My House	Channel A	Host
2019	The Hit	KBS2	Co-host with Song Eun-i
2019	We K-Pop	KBS World	Co-host with Nichkhun, Inseong, Seungmin
2021	Spicy Girls	iHQ	Cast Member
2022	Chart Sisters	tvN STORY	Host; with Celeb Five Member
2022	Map to Go Again	Channel S	Host with Kim Ji-seok
2022	I'm not going to die	KBS2	Host
2022	Again, First Love	MBC Every1	Host
2022–present	Korea Sings	KBS1	Host

=== Web shows ===
Year	Title	Role	Notes	Ref.
2022	Celeb Five: Behind the Curtain	Cast Member	with Celeb Five Member	

=== Hosting ===
Year	Title	Notes	Ref.
2022	KBS Song Festival	with Jang Won-young and Na In-woo	

=== Radio shows ===
Year	Title	Notes
2008	Stop the Boring Time Radio	DJ with Shindong
2013-	Kim Shin Young's Noon Song of Hope	DJ

=== Film ===
Year	Title	Role	Notes/Ref.
2005	My Girl and I	Su-ho's sister	
2010	Midnight FM		Cameo
2022	Decision to Leave	Yeon-su	Special appearance

=== Television drama ===
Year	Title	Network	Role	Notes
2006	Rainbow Romance	MBC		
2009	Queen of Housewives	MBC	Couple in sauna with Shindong	Cameo (Episode 11)
2011	All My Love for You	MBC	Kim Se-byul	Cameo (Episode 77)
2016	Another Miss Oh	tvN	Herself	Cameo (Episode 12)

== Awards ==
- 2006: 42nd Baeksang Arts Awards - Best Female Variety Performer
- 2008: MBC Drama Award - Radio Rookie Award
- 2009: KBS Entertainment Awards - Best Newcomer
- 2010: MBC Entertainment Awards - Excellence Award in a Variety Show
- 2011: MBC Entertainment Awards - Friendship Award
- 2013: MBC Entertainment Awards - Top Excellence Award for Radio
- 2022: 43rd Blue Dragon Film Awards - Best New Actress / nom; Decision to Leave
- 2022 : 2022 KBS Entertainment Awards - Excellence Award in Show and Variety Category / won; Korea Sings
