= Busan International Comedy Festival =

International comedy festival in South Korea

- Genre: Comedy festival
- Frequency: Annual
- Locations: Busan, South Korea
- Years active: 2013-present
- Founded: August 29, 2013
- Most recent: August 19 to August 28, 2022
- Previous event: 9th
- Next event: 11th
- Patrons: Ministry of Culture, Sports and Tourism; Busan Metropolitan City, BICF Advisory Committee
- Organiser: Busan International Comedy Festival Organizing Committee
- Website: BICF
- 10th

The Busan International Comedy Festival (BICF; Korean: 부산국제코미디페스티벌) is an annual comedy festival and cultural event held in Busan, South Korea. Since its establishment in 2013, the festival takes place for four days in late August to early September every year. The BICF includes comedic performances and acts from around the world, featuring sketch shows and stand-up acts. The festival has since grown from its 2013 debut; South Korean teams such as KBS's Gag Concert, SBS's Searching for Laughs and tvN's Comedy Big League are joined by a variety of teams from many different countries, such as the United Kingdom, South Africa, Japan and Italy. The festival is the largest international comedy festival in Asia and the first in South Korea.

The festival's shows are structured by first holding the opening gala, where invited comedians walk on a "blue carpet", a spin-off from the red carpets at film festivals. Over the course of four days, comedy acts perform in indoor theaters as well as outdoor venues.

The Busan International Comedy Festival Organizing Committee currently includes the honorary chairman Jeon Yu-seong, the executive chairman Kim Jun-ho and the vice-directors Choi Dae-woong, Cho Kwang-sik, and the board member Kim Dae-hee.

== History ==
The festival was launched on August 29, 2013 and was held through September 1. It was only held at the Hall of Busan Film, where it attracted 21,198 spectators through the next four days. The show featured 17 teams from 7 countries. As it was the first festival, head of the organizing committee and comedian Kim Jun ho stated, "Since this is the first festival, we're having some problems with the lodging and transportation and such. I'm sure it'll get better with future festivals."

The second festival was held from August 29 to September 1, 2014, under the slogan, "Smile is Hope". The opening gala was held at Busan Cinema Center, and the shows were held at Movies of Fame, KBS Hall, Ye-no Theater at Kyungsung University, Shinsegae Culture Hall, and Busan Citizen's Park Dasom Yard. Twelve teams from seven countries performed at the festival, attracting 26,865 audience members. On-gals and the Gag Concert team represented Korea, while Tape Face and Beky Hoop represented the UK and Canada. Moriyas Bangbangbigaro from Japan and 6D from Australia also performed.

The 3rd Busan International Comedy Festival was held from August 28 to August 31, 2015 with 13 shows under the conjoined slogan, "Busan sea of Laughter, Laughter is Hope (부산바다 웃음바다, 웃음이 희망이다)". The opening gala was held at Busan Cinema Center. While the international acts were performed at Ye-no Art Hall at Kyungsung University, domestic acts were performed at Theatre HAPPENING and Sasang Indie Station. Certain international and domestic acts congregated at the Comedy Open Concert, which was held outdoors at Busan Citizen's Park Dasom Yard, Haeundae Beach, and Gamman Creative Community Space. All in all, 28 teams from 12 countries performed at the festival. Comedians from different TV networks (KBS, MBC, SBS, tvN) participated in the event, as well as different acts from the United States, Britain, Australia, Canada, Germany, China, Japan, Taiwan, Malaysia, Switzerland, and Africa. Bunk Puppets of Canada, The Umbilical Brothers from Australia, The Street Circus from Canada and Montreux Comedy@Busan were part of the international comedy acts lineup. The event attracted more than 35,000 spectators.

The 9th Busan International Comedy Festival was held from August 20 to August 29, 2021.

The 10th Busan International Comedy Festival was held from August 19 to August 28, 2022. Kim Seong-won and Byun Ki-soo, hosted the opening ceremony at Busan Haeundae-gu Film Hall on 19 August.

The 11th Busan International Comedy Festival was held from August 25 to September 3, 2023.

The 12th Busan International Comedy Festival was held from August 23 to September 1, 2025

== Awards ==
The festival currently presents three awards: Ocean of Busan Prize, Ocean of Laughter Award, and the Rookie Award. Since 2013, the Ocean of Busan Prize is awarded to the best domestic South Korean comedic act while the Ocean of Laughter Award is given to the best international comedic performance. In 2015, the rookie award was established, which was awarded to the best newcomer to comedy. Each prize consists of a trophy and ₩5 million, except for the rookie award, which awards ₩3 million.

=== Busan Sea Award ===
| Year | Best Domestic Comedic act | Ref. |
|---|---|---|
| 1st 2013 | Yadda's (옹알스) | |
| 2nd 2014 | Gag Dream Concert Dumb and Dumber Show | |
| 3rd 2015 | Coskets (코스켓) | |
| 4th 2016 | Lee Kyung-kyu Show | |
| 5th 2017 | Park Mi-seon Show | |
| 6th 2018 | Lim Ha-ryong 40th Anniversary Dinner Show | |
| 7th 2019 | Jeon Yoo-seong's concert | |
| 8th 2020 | Shogman | |
| 9th 2021 | The 40th Anniversary of Choi Yang-rak Debut Special Show | |

=== Sea of laughter ===
| Year | Best International Comedic Act | Ref. |
|---|---|---|
| 1st 2013 | Dandy Man | |
| 2nd 2014 | The Umbilical Brothers | |
| 3rd 2015 | Bunk Puppets | |
| 4th 2016 | Trygve Wakenshow | |
| 5th 2017 | Mario: Queen of the Circus | |
| 6th 2018 | Bubble on Circus | |
| 7th 2019 | Tape face | |
| 8th 2020 | Bunk Puppet | |
| 9th 2021 | Reyo | |

=== Rookie Award ===
| Year | Best Newcomer Comedic Act | Ref. |
|---|---|---|
| 3rd 2015 | Come Here Show (Kim Ki-ri, Ryu Geun-ji, Kim Sung-won, Seo Tae-hun) | |
| 4th 2016 | Comedy Monsters | |
| 5th 2017 | We Need Communication (Kim Dae-hee, Shin Bong-sun, Jang Dong-min) | |

== Broadcast and sponsors ==
Korea New Network (KNN) is the official sponsor and broadcaster for the festival. The festival is also sponsored by the Ministry of Culture, Sports, and Tourism as well as the Busan Metropolitan City. All sponsors can be found here: BICF Sponsors.

== See also ==
- List of film festivals in South Korea
- Cinema of Korea
- Busan International Film Festival (BIFF)
- Busan International Fireworks Festival
- Busan International Mobility Show (BIMOS)
- Culture of South Korea
- Comedy festivals
