= Neon Highwire =

English electronic music group

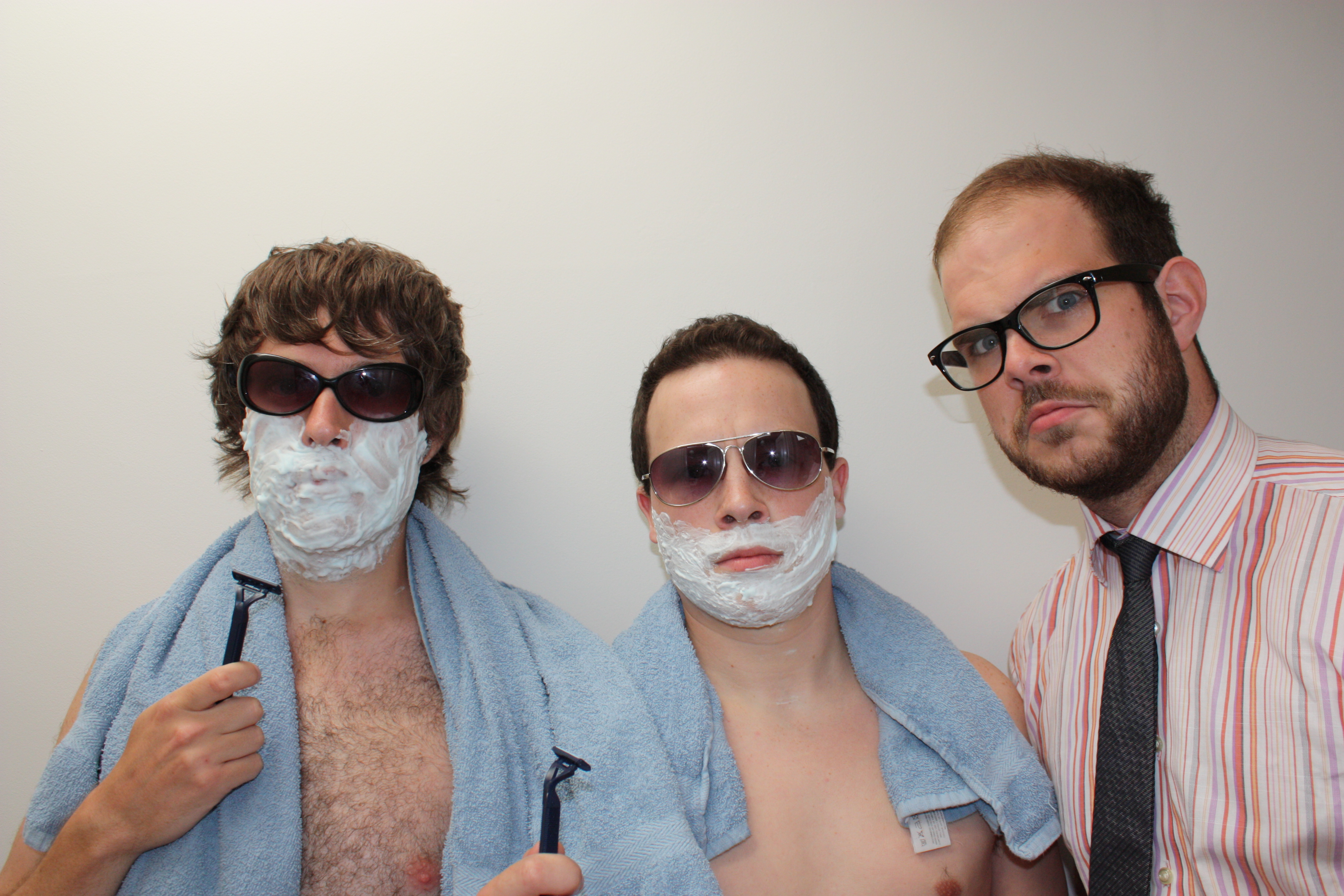
- From the Luminescence promotional photoshoot by Bryony Burrows 2009

Background information
- Origin: London, England
- Genres: Electronic, pop, Rock
- Years active: 2008–2016
- Labels: Health Bomber, Blue Dove Records
- Members: Steven Morgan; James Dippie; Luke Fussell
- Website: Official website

Neon Highwire were an English electronic music group formed in London, England in 2008. The band consisted of Steven Morgan, James Dippie, and Luke Fussell. All three members of the band sang, played guitar, played synths and were producers in their own right, yet none played the drums. They described their music as "surrealist geek electro". James Dippie also releases remixes under the name Novelty Music Scene whilst Luke Fussell also releases under the moniker Hail! Perestroika. They are renowned for energetic live shows and are known to often lie in interviews.

== Luminescence ==
On 14 December 2009, Neon Highwire digitally released their debut EP titled Luminescence to mostly positive reviews. The release was self recorded and mastered at The Exchange studio by Simon Davey. It was physically released on 20 January 2010.

== Christmas single ==
The band made the track "Fantasy Land (Christmas In The TerrorZone)" available for a free download on the sites SoundCloud and Last.fm on 24 December 2009, which contains a spoken word sample of Rutger Hauer taken from the film Blade Runner. A Hail! Perestroika remix of the track was released as part of a series of advent calendar gifts from the music blog Never Enough Notes in 2010.

== "Bear At The Bus Stop" and "Neon Blink" ==
In May 2010, Neon Highwire released the download only single "Bear At The Bus Stop", with an accompanying promotional video. Later in the year on 10 December 2010, the song "Neon Blink", originally from the Luminescence EP, was released as a digital single on Blue Dove Records with a number of remixes of the track as b-sides from artists such as Fresh:Mesh, Sizeable Moth Hat and Christian Paduraru.

== "Kim Jong Il Looking At Things" ==
On 26 January 2011, the band released a song titled "Kim Jong Il Looking At Things" in homage to the website of the same name. The song was adopted as the "National Anthem" for the website and subsequently featured in the B3ta newsletter.

== Blue Dove Records ==
During 2011, a number of Neon Highwire remixes appeared on the Digital House Moments, Sunset 2 Sunrise Volume 9 and Electro House Essentials Volume 7 compilation releases from Blue Dove Records.

== Relate ==
They announced the release date of their début album, Relate, was 9 September 2013 to a positive reception.

== "Gyrophant" ==
On 24 January 2014, the Synth City Records Compilation Volume 1 was released featuring the exclusive track "Gyrophant" from Neon Highwire.

== Bookreader and break up ==
On 29 January 2016, the band released one last EP titled Bookreader to coincide with their break up.

== Discography ==
=== Albums ===
- Relate (2013)

=== EPs ===
- Luminescence (2009)
- Bookreader (2016)

=== Singles ===
- "Bear At The Bus Stop" (2010)
- "Neon Blink" (2010)
- "Spin Off" (2011)
