= Celeb Five =

South Korean girl group

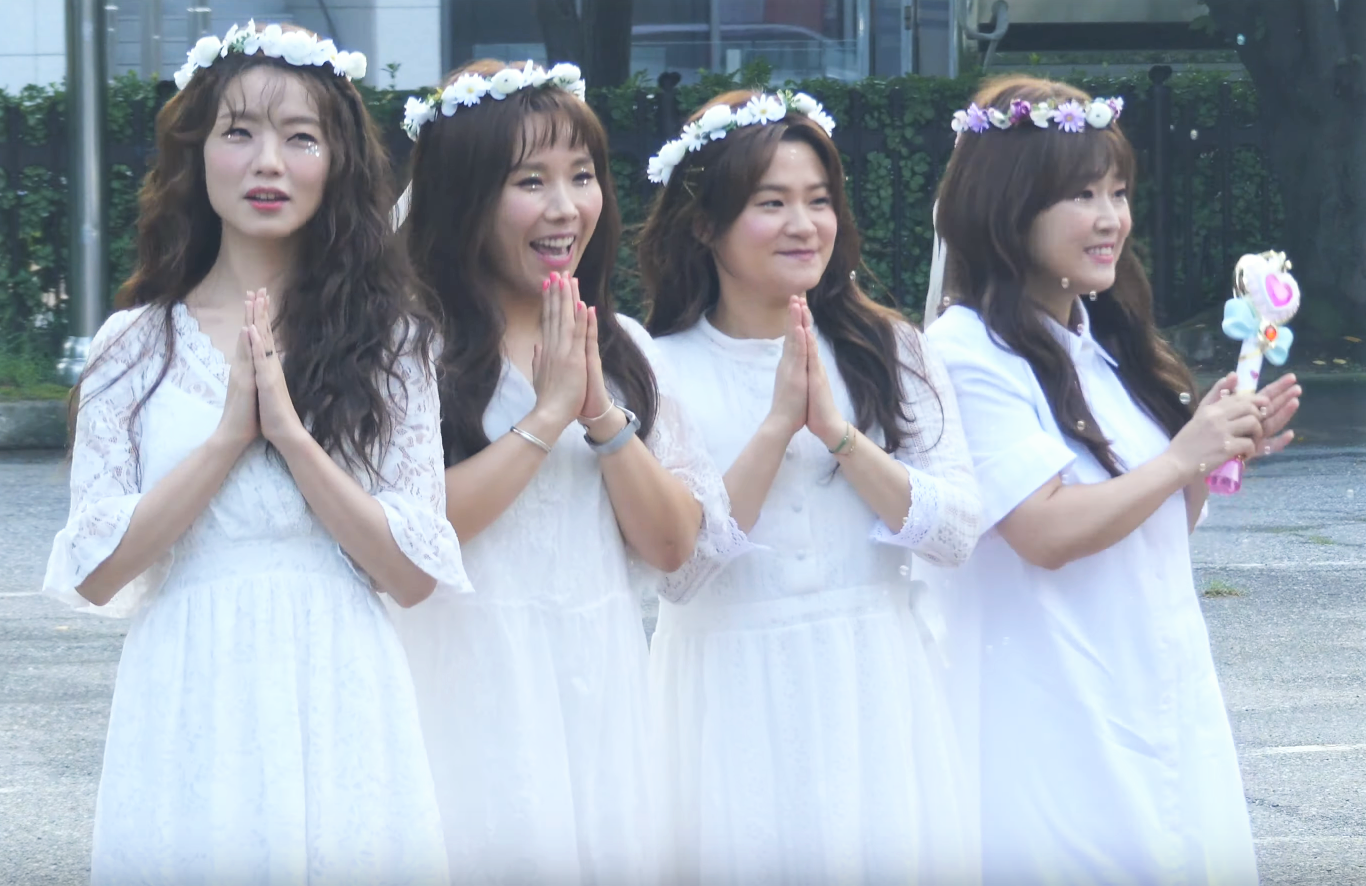
- Celeb Five in 2019

Background information
- Origin: Seoul, South Korea
- Genres: K-pop; comedy
- Years active: 2018–present
- Label: VIVO Wave
- Members: Kim Shin-young; Song Eun-i; Shin Bong-sun; Ahn Young-mi
- Past members: Kim Young-hee

Celeb Five (Korean: 셀럽파이브) is a South Korean girl group composed of female comedians. The group is composed of four members: Kim Shin-young, Song Eun-i, Shin Bong-sun, and Ahn Young-mi. Celeb Five was originally a five-piece group; Kim Young-hee later departed from the group in late 2018.

== History ==
Prior to the group's debut, all the members of the group have been experienced comedians in the industry. The group presents a fresh, creative, and fun concept by performing with 1980s-era glitzy outfits and often barefoot while employing the choreography and vocals of a 1980s-1990s K-pop group, a concept that drastically contrasts with those of most other K-pop groups in South Korea. They officially debuted on January 24, 2018 with the song "I Wanna Be a Celeb", a parody of "Dancing Hero (Eat You Up)" using the concept and choreography from Tomioka Dance Club. The music video was directed by Super Junior's Shindong.

On October 11, 2018, FNC Entertainment stated that Kim Young-hee has graduated with honor from the group while the rest of the members would continue as a 4-member group. Kim later explained that her decision was because she wanted to pursue theater acting and that she also did not want to burden her other members with her poor dancing skills.

On November 19, 2018, the group made a comeback with Shutter, a disco track that incorporates 1980s synth pop with a feature of South Korean actor Lee Deok Hwa. Korean singer Muzie participated in producing and composing the track, while leader Kim Shin-young wrote the lyrics and member Song Eun-i co-directed the music video.

On top of participating in multiple music programmes such as MBC Music's Show Champion and Mnet's M Countdown, they also participated in various variety programmes such as MBC's Infinite Challenge, JTBC's Knowing Bros and MBC's Weekly Idol. They also participated in 2 seasons of Vivo TV's web series "Round Throwers" that reveal Celeb Five’s song-making process.

== Honours ==
Celeb Five performed in the 2019 Melbourne International Comedy Festival as the closing act of "Upfront", an all-female comedian event featuring entertainers from around the world on April 17, 2019. They also performed in other festival programmes such as "Very Big Laugh Out" and a Festival Club event.

== Filmography ==
=== Reality Web shows ===
Year	Title	Channel	Seasons
2018	Round Throwers	Vivo TV	2

== Discography ==
=== Singles ===
Title	Year	Peak positions	Album
Title	Year	KOR	Album
"Celeb Five (I Wanna Be a Celeb)" (셀럽파이브 (셀럽이 되고 싶어))	2018	— (Note: "Celeb Five (I Wanna Be a Celeb)" did not enter the Gaon Digital Chart, but debuted and peaked at number 99 on Gaon Download Chart.)	Celeb No. 1
"Shutter" (셔터) (featuring Lee Deok-hwa)	2018	— (Note: "Shutter" did not enter the Gaon Digital Chart, but debuted and peaked at number 82 on Gaon Download Chart.)	Shutter
"I Wish I Could Unsee That" (안 본 눈 삽니다) (Narr. Seolhyun)	2019	—	Non-album singles
"—" denotes releases that did not chart.

== Awards and nominations ==
Name of the award ceremony, year presented, category, nominee of the award, and the result of the nomination
Award ceremony	Year	Category	Nominee / Work	Result	Ref.
Blue Dragon Series Awards	2022	Best Female Entertainer	Celeb Five : Behind the Curtain	Won	
MBC Plus X Genie Music Awards (MGA)	2018	Discovery of the Year award – 2018	Celeb Five	Won	
