= Noh Sa-yeon =

South Korean singer (born 1957)

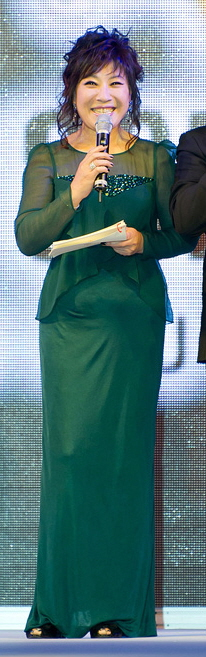

Background information
- Born: March 3, 1957 (age 68); Changwon, South Korea
- Genres: K-pop
- Occupations: Singer, television personality, radio DJ
- Years active: 1978—present

Korean name
- Hangul: 노사연
- RR: No Sayeon
- MR: No Sayŏn

Noh Sa-yeon (Korean: 노사연; born March 3, 1957) is a South Korean singer, television personality, and radio DJ.

== Discography ==
=== Studio albums ===
Title	Album details	Peak chart positions	Sales
Title	Album details	KOR	Sales
Biyeon Song / Roundabout Way (비연곡 / 돌고 돌아가는 길)	Released: September 13, 1979; Label: Jigu Records; Formats: LP	—N/a	—N/a
Your Shadow (님 그림자)	Released: March 20, 1983; Label: Jigu Records; Formats: LP, CD	—N/a	—N/a
Meeting (만남)	Released: August 10, 1989; Label: Jigu Records; Formats: LP, CD	—N/a	—N/a
My Heart Is Here Again (이 마음 다시 여기에)	Released: June 20, 1992; Label: Jigu Records; Formats: LP, CD	—N/a	—N/a
Woman (여자)	Released: September 3, 1994; Label: Sony Music; Formats: CD	—N/a	—N/a
The Seven Year Itch	Released: June 28, 2001; Label: Doremi; Formats: CD	—N/a	—N/a
Wish (바램)	Released: May 7, 2015; Label: CJ E&M Music; Formats: CD, digital download	11	KOR: 12,681+

== Filmography ==
=== Television shows ===
Year	Title	Role	Notes	Ref.
2021–2023	Saturday Meals Love	Cast Member	November 2021–July 2023	

== Awards ==
Year	Award	Category	Nominated work	Result	Ref.
1978	MBC Campus Music Festival	Gold Prize	"Roundabout Way"	Won	
1991	Golden Disc Awards	Main Prize (Bonsang)	Meeting	Won	
1991	Seoul Music Awards	Main Prize (Bonsang)	Meeting	Won	
1991	MBC Ten Singers Song Festival	Best Song	"Meeting"	Won	
1991	MBC Ten Singers Song Festival	Most Popular Song	"Meeting"	Won	
1992	Golden Disc Awards	Main Prize (Bonsang)	My Heart Is Here Again	Won	
2003	MBC Drama Awards	Excellence in Radio	Joyful 2 p.m.	Won	
2013	SBS Entertainment Awards	Radio DJ Award	—N/a	Won	
