= Baeksang Arts Award for Best Female Variety Performer =

Part of South Korea's annual Baeksang Arts Awards

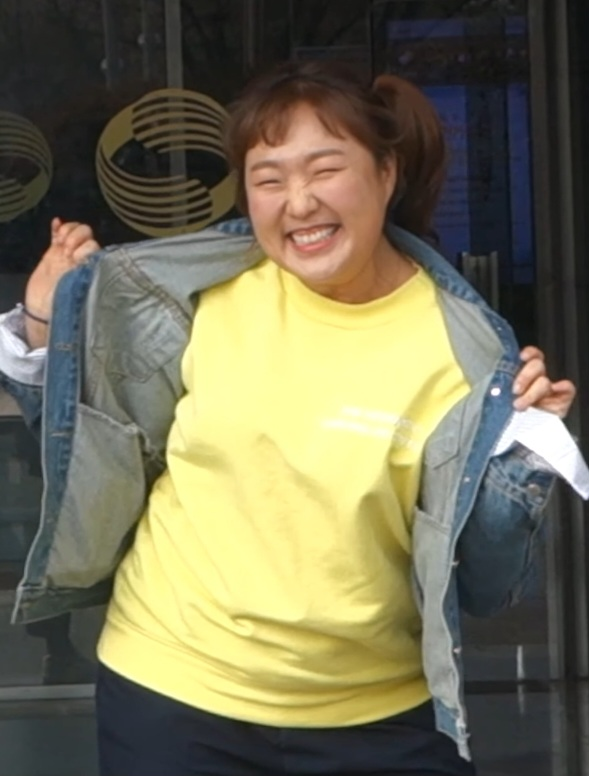
- 2026 recipient: Lee Soo-ji
- Awarded for: Best female performance in South Korean variety programs
- Country: South Korea
- Presented by: Baeksang Arts Awards
- Most recent winner: Lee Soo-ji (2026)
- Website: baeksangartsawards

The Baeksang Arts Award for Best Female Variety Performer (Korean: 백상예술대상 TV부문 여자 예능상; RR: Baeksang Yesul Daesang TV Bumun Yeoja Yeneungsang) is annually presented at the Baeksang Arts Awards ceremony.

== List of winners ==
#	Year	Recipient	Variety show / Sitcom
34th	1998	Kim Hyo-jin	HyumeonTV Jeulgeoun Suyoil (휴먼TV 즐거운 수요일)
35th	1999	Kim Hyo-jin	Theme Game (테마게임)
36th	2000	Park Mi-sun	Soonpoong Clinic (순풍산부인과)
37th	2001	Park Kyung-lim	Jeonpagyeonmunrok (전파견문록)
38th	2002	Kim Mi-hua	Gag Concert
39th	2003	Kim Ji-sun	Gag Concert
40th	2004	Jo Hye-ryun	Comedy House (코미디하우스)
41st	2005	Park Hee-jin	Hello Franceska
42nd	2006	Kim Shin-young	People Looking for a Laugh (웃찾사)
43rd	2007	Kim Mi-ryeo	It's a Gag (개그야)
44th	2008	Shin Bong-sun	Happy Together
45th	2009	Park Mi-sun	Sunday Night
46th	2010	Kang Yu-mi; Ahn Young-mi	Gag Concert
47th	2011	Kim Won-hee	Come to Play (놀러와)
48th	2012	Park Ha-sun	High Kick: Revenge of the Short Legged
49th	2013	Shin Bo-ra	Gag Concert
50th	2014	Kim Young-hee	Gag Concert
51st	2015	Lee Guk-joo	Roommate; Comedy Big League
52nd	2016	Kim Sook	With You
53rd	2017	Park Na-rae	I Live Alone
54th	2018	Song Eun-i	Omniscient Interfering View
55th	2019	Lee Young-ja	Omniscient Interfering View
56th	2020	Park Na-rae	I Live Alone
57th	2021	Jang Do-yeon	I Live Alone; Don't be the First One!
58th	2022	Joo Hyun-young	SNL Korea Reboot
59th	2023	Lee Eun-ji	Earth Arcade (뿅뿅 지구오락실)
60th	2024	Hong Jin-kyung	Beat Coin; Anbang Judge; Korean Food Tray; Single's Inferno
61st	2025	Lee Soo-ji	SNL Korea Reboot
62nd	2026	Lee Soo-ji	SNL Korea Reboot

== Sources ==
- "Baeksang Arts Awards Nominees and Winners Lists". Naver Movie (in Korean).
- "Baeksang Arts Awards Winners Lists". Baeksang Arts Awards (in Korean).
