= Jang Wooyoung =

South Korean singer (born 1989)

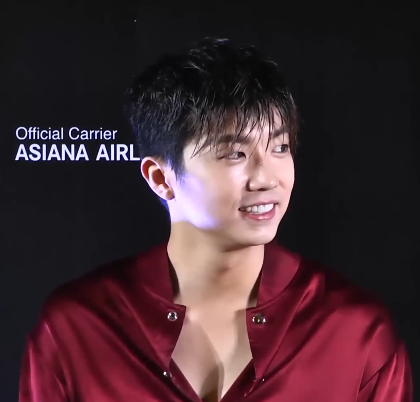
- Jang in 2016
- Born: Jang Woo-young; April 30, 1989 (age 37); Dong District, Busan, South Korea
- Education: Seoul Institute of the Arts (AA); Howon University (BA)
- Occupations: Singer-songwriter; Entertainer
- Musical career
- Genres: K-pop; J-pop
- Instrument: Vocals
- Years active: 2008–present
- Label: JYP
- Member of: 2PM; JYP Nation
- Website: 2pm.jype.com

Korean name
- Hangul: 장우영
- RR: Jang Uyeong
- MR: Chang Uyŏng

Signature
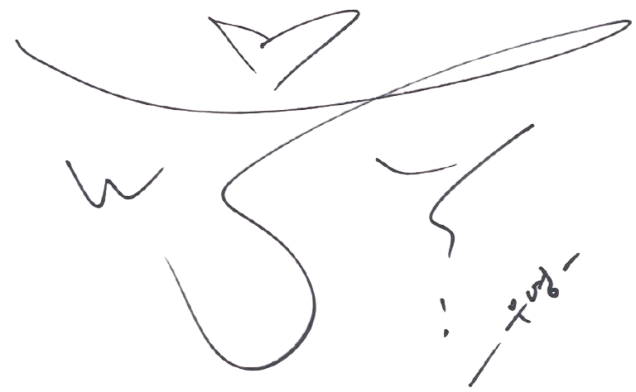

Jang Woo-young (Korean: 장우영; born April 30, 1989), known mononymously as Wooyoung, is a South Korean singer-songwriter and entertainer. In 2008, he debuted as a member of 2PM, a boy band currently managed by JYP Entertainment. He debuted as a solo artist in 2012 with his first extended play, 23, Male, Single. As of 2026, he has released a total of six EPs and one compilation album.

Following his discharge from his mandatory military service in 2020, Jang has worked as a television personality on various Korean variety shows such as Beat Coin, I Can See Your Voice, and Street Man Fighter. He is also known for his role as Jason in the 2011 Korean drama Dream High.

== Early life and education ==
Born and raised in Dong District, Busan, Jang enjoyed dancing from a young age but was forced to hide his interest from his father, who had strongly disapproved of his ambitions to become a dancer due to the lack of job stability. In 2007, he secretly applied for JYP Entertainment's first open audition and uploaded clips himself dancing on the website Mgoon, an early Korean predecessor of YouTube. He eventually beat thousands of applicants and placed first, with future Highlight member Yoon Doo-joon placing second.

Upon moving to Seoul to begin training under JYP Entertainment, he attended Seoul Institute of the Arts as a dance major. In 2009, he began an undergraduate degree in broadcasting at Howon University, the same university his bandmates Lee Jun-ho and Hwang Chan-sung attended.

== Career ==
=== 2PM ===
In 2008, he participated in Mnet's Hot Blooded Men, a program that chronicles the rigorous training of thirteen aspiring trainees, all vying for a coveted spot in the boy band One Day. This initiative ultimately led to the formation of two distinct boy bands, namely 2AM and 2PM.

Half a year following the televised airing of Hot Blooded Men, the group 2PM made their debut with the release of their inaugural single "10 Out of 10" from their first single album titled Hottest Time of the Day. However, it was their second single album, 2:00PM Time For Change, that propelled them to mainstream success in Korean music, solidifying their meteoric rise. As of 2021, the group has released seven studio albums in Korea and five studio albums in Japan. Jang has written and composed several songs for the group, including "Make It", the title track of their seventh studio album, Must.

In 2022, Jang held a joint fan-concert with bandmate Jun. K titled 115430 in Seoul on April 30 and May 1, with the latter show also being streamed online via Beyond Live. He has also participated in activities of the unofficial 2PM sub-unit ENWJ with Jun. K and Nichkhun, holding events and concerts with the group since 2023.

=== Solo work ===
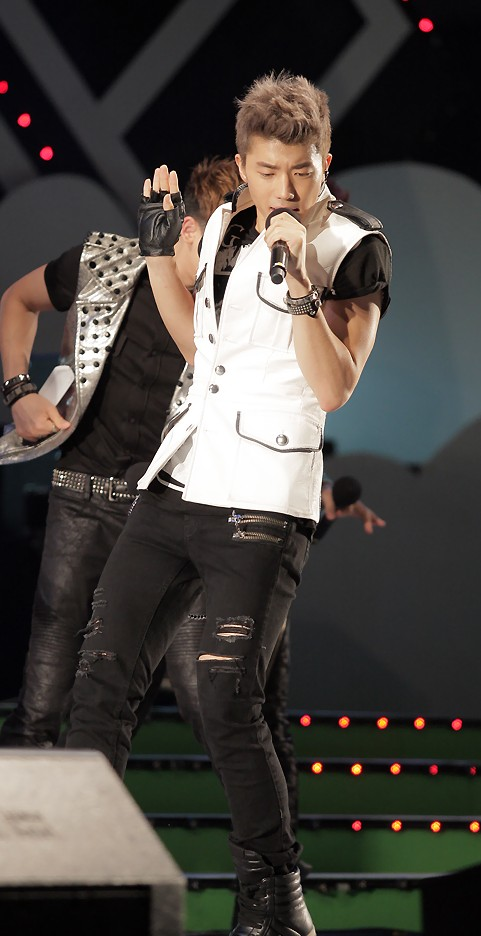
Jang in July 2011

On May 24, 2012, JYP Entertainment announced that Jang would release his debut solo album in early July. On June 28, he performed two of the album's tracks at the Mnet 20's Choice Awards: "2Nite" and title track "Sexy Lady". The EP, titled 23, Male, Single, was released on July 8 and included two songs composed and written by fellow 2PM members Jun. K and Lee Jun-ho. He held a mini-showcase on July 9 and appeared on TV music programs such as Mnet's M Countdown starting from July 12 as part of the mini-album's promotion. The EP peaked at number two on the Gaon Weekly Album Chart and stayed on the chart for six consecutive weeks.

In September 2012, Jang, along with J.Y. Park, his bandmate Ok Taec-yeon and miss A's Suzy, promoted the clothing line Reebok's "Classic Campaign" with a collaboration song titled "Classic". In December 2013, Jang collaborated with 125 artists including his bandmates Jun. K, Nichkhun, and Hwang Chan-sung for a single titled "You Are a Miracle" for the 2013 SBS Gayo Daejeon, the proceeds of which were donated to charity. In 2014, Jang released two duets: "Holding Hands Together" (깍지 낀 두 손) with Park Se-young as part of the MBC variety show We Got Married and "Fireflies' Glow" (반딧불을 따라서) with indie singer Lel.

Jang made his solo debut in Japan on March 4, 2015 with the single album R.O.S.E, while concurrently holding a concert tour with the same name with nine shows in Tokyo, Osaka, and Nagoya from February 19 to March 11. R.O.S.E peaked at number two on the Oricon Daily Singles Chart and number five on the Oricon Weekly Singles Chart. On April 20, he released a Korean version of the single album, which peaked at number four on the Gaon Albums Chart and stayed on the chart for six consecutive weeks.

In 2017, Jang released two EPs in Japan: Party Shots on April 19 and Mada Boku Wa... (まだ僕は・・・) on October 11. Both mini-albums peaked at number two on the Oricon Weekly Albums Chart. In addition, both EPs were released in the midst of a solo Japanese concert tour: Party Shots from April 5–30, which ended on his birthday, and Mada Boku Wa... (まだ僕は・・・) from September 29 to December 6, which ended with two concerts at the Nippon Budokan. On October 11, Jang released the single "Still Here" (똑같지 뭐), a Korean version of the title track "Mada Boku Wa..." (まだ僕は・・・, Same Old) from the EP of the same name.

On January 15, 2018, Jang released his second Korean EP titled Bye (헤어질 때), which included Korean versions of two songs from his Japanese EP Party Shots, "Going Going" and "Party Shots". During his week-long promotions for the mini-album, he performed "Don't Act" and title track "Quit" (뚝) on TV music programs. Bye peaked at number four on the Gaon Albums Chart and stayed on the chart for four weeks. Jang then held a series of eight concerts titled Eh? Call! (엥? Call!) in Seoul, Tokyo, Osaka, and his hometown of Busan from February 9 to April 29, marking his first solo concerts in South Korea.

An episode of the MBC show Song One – The Song of My Life featuring Jang as a guest aired on September 30, 2018, having been filmed prior to his enlistment for his mandatory military service. In the episode, Jang performed a cover of the 2003 song "Think About' Chu" by Korean indie band Asoto Union; the cover version was released as a digital single the next day.

On June 7, 2023, Jang released his third Japanese EP titled Off the Record, which consisted of five tracks including a title track of the same name, while holding a solo concert tour with the same name from May 24 to June 11 with five dates in four cities: Fukuoka, Yokohama, Tokyo, and Osaka. In 2024, he held his first solo fan meetings titled Be Young in Seoul on August 3–4, Busan on September 28–29, Osaka on December 14–15, and Yokohama on December 21.

On June 23, 2025, Jang released a digital single titled "Simple Dance", his first solo Korean release in seven years. He released his third Korean EP titled I'm Into with the title track "Think Too Much" featuring rapper Damini on September 15 and held a concert titled Half Half in Seoul on September 27–28. In commemoration of the tenth of his anniversary of his debut as a solo artist in Japan, he released his first compilation album titled 3650.zip, with two new tracks: "Reason" and a cover of the self-composed song "Yo Moriagatte Yo" (Yo モリアガッテ Yo), originally released by his former labelmates Got7. In conjunction with the release, he brought his Half Half concert series in Tokyo on November 29–30 and Kobe on December 27–28. He also held a Half Half concert in Taipei on March 8, 2026, marking his first concert as a solo artist in Taiwan.

=== Television career ===
Jang and fellow 2PM member Ok Taec-yeon hosted SBS's music show Inkigayo with actress Ha Yeon-joo from July 2009 to January 2010 and with f(x)'s Sulli from February 2010 to July 2010. From February 2, 2010 to August 3, 2010, he starred as an assistant MC on Kim Seung-woo's KBS talk show Win Win alongside Girls' Generation's Taeyeon.

In 2014, he was paired with actress Park Se-young as a couple for nine months during the fourth season of MBC's We Got Married. In 2017, Jang and model Irene Kim hosted the web show Which Is Better?, in which the two tested trending products and services to evaluate their value worth.

In 2021, he was a fixed panelist on the eighth season of I Can See Your Voice after previously appearing as a guest in the third and fifth seasons. The same year, he was cast as a judge for Joseon Top Singer, a Korean traditional music competition program. In 2022, he was cast as a judge for Mnet's Street Man Fighter, a dance competition show between male dance crews, due to his past experience in street dance battles prior to his debut. In 2023, he was interviewed for the documentary series K-Pop Generation along with his bandmates Jun. K, Nichkhun, and Hwang Chan-sung. That same year, he was cast as a judge and producer on the reality competition shows My Teenage Boy: Fantasy Boys and King of Karaoke: VS.

From 2022 to 2024, Jang was a main cast member of the KBS2 weekly variety show Beat Coin. Along with his co-star Joo Woo-jae, he was nominated for the Rookie of the Year Award at the 2022 KBS Entertainment Awards for his work on the show. He rejoined the cast and production team of Beat Coin on a successor show titled Screwballs, which began airing on Netflix on February 23, 2025.

In 2025, Jang hosted two YouTube web shows: the web variety series K-Requests on OOTB Studio's YouTube channel, which focused on product design research and development activities for various companies, and the interview web series Should We Meet Up Today? on Billboard Korea's YouTube channel. Later that year, he was cast as a co-host for the KBS2 dating show Mind the Noona Gap.

In 2026, he was a cast member for the tvN home renovation show Unpredictable House. Later that year, he started a personal YouTube channel, JangWooyoungE, with the series Producer Wooyoung Booyoung documenting the songwriting and preparation process for an upcoming concert series scheduled to start in November.

=== Acting ===
Jang debuted as an actor in the 2011 KBS teen drama Dream High, in which he played the role of Jason, a Korean-American dancer. In preparation for the role, he studied English with the help of his bandmates Taecyeon and Nichkhun, both of whom had previously lived in the United States. His on-screen romance with co-star IU garnered attention, with the two being nominated for the Best Couple Award at the 2011 KBS Drama Awards.

In September 2011, Jang and Dream High co-star Suzy made a cameo appearance in an ending credits scene of the KBS drama special Human Casino, playing the role of a couple caught up in gambling scandals. In December 2013, he appeared in the short film The Miracle, a parody of popular TV series with a cast made up entirely of K-pop idols, which aired during the 2013 SBS Gayo Daejeon.

In 2024, Jang revealed that despite passing casting auditions for more acting opportunities since Dream High, he chose to turn them down in order to focus on his music career instead.

== Personal life ==
=== Military enlistment ===
Jang enlisted for his mandatory military service on July 9, 2018. He served at the 21st Infantry Division of the South Korean Army, with a discharge date scheduled for February 28, 2020. However, on February 25, 2020, a representative from JYP Entertainment confirmed that Jang was already discharged, a few days earlier than his scheduled discharge date, due to the COVID-19 pandemic in South Korea.

=== Philanthropy ===
On April 19, 2019, Jang donated 50 million won to help those recovering from damage from the 2019 Goseong fire through the Hope Bridge Korea Disaster Relief Association. At the time, he was in the midst of his military service in Gangwon-do, which was the primary area impacted by the fires.

From June 26, 2020 to July 15, 2020, Jang collaborated with BOX337, an organization which works with celebrities who donate personal items to be sold, the proceeds of which are sent to charities. The proceeds of Jang's donation campaign went to the Green Umbrella Children's Foundation.

On March 31, 2025, Jang donated 100 million won to help those recovering from damage from the 2025 South Korea wildfires through the Hope Bridge Korea Disaster Relief Association.

== Filmography ==
=== Television series ===
Year	Title	Role	Notes	Ref.
2011	Dream High	Jason	Nominated for KBS Drama Award for Best Couple (with IU)	
2011	Human Casino	Himself	Cameo (Episode 1); with Suzy	
2013	The Miracle	Joo Joong-won	For 2013 SBS Gayo Daejeon	

=== Variety and reality shows ===
Year	Title	Role	Notes	Ref.
2009	Inkigayo	Host	July 26 – January 24; with Ok Taec-yeon and Ha Yeon-joo	
2010	Inkigayo	Host	February 7 – July 11; with Ok Taec-yeon and Sulli	
2010	Win Win	Host	Episodes 1–13, 15–18, 20–26; with Taeyeon	
2014	We Got Married (Season 4)	Main cast	Episodes 72–105; with Park Se-young	
2021	I Can See Your Voice (Season 8)	Main panelist	Episodes 1–12	
2021	Joseon Top Singer	Judge	Episodes 1–12	
2022–2024	Beat Coin	Main cast	Episodes 1–70	
2022	Street Man Fighter	Judge	Episodes 1–10	
2023	K-Pop Generation	Interviewee	with Jun. K, Nichkhun, and Hwang Chan-sung	
2023	My Teenage Boy: Fantasy Boys	Producer	Episodes 1–11	
2023	King of Karaoke: VS	Producer	Episodes 1–10; with Seo Eun-kwang	
2025–2026	Screwballs	Main cast		
2025–2026	Mind the Noona Gap (Season 1)	Co-host		
2026	Unpredictable House	Main cast		
2026	Mind the Noona Gap (Season 2)	Co-host		

=== Web shows ===
Year	Title	Role	Notes	Ref.
2017	Which Is Better?	Host	Episodes 1–8; with Irene Kim	
2025	K-Requests	Host	Episodes 0–9	
2025	Should We Meet Up Today?	Host	Episodes 1–4	

=== DVDs ===
Title	DVD details	Peak positions	Sales
Title	DVD details	JPN	Sales
Wooyoung (From 2PM) Japan Premium Showcase R.O.S.E	Released: August 19, 2015; Language: Japanese; Performances: 1. "Happy Birthday"; 2. "I Know Your Shirts"; 3. "Give Up"; 4. "2Nite"; 5. "Sexy Lady"; 6. "Letting You Go"; 7. "I Already Got a Girl"; 8. "The House You Live In" (song by J.Y. Park); 9. "Kiss"; 10. "Cocktail"; 11. "R.O.S.E"; 12. "Falling Down"; 13. "This is Love"; 14. "Be With You"; 15. "Merry-Go-Round"; 16. "DJ Got Me Goin' Crazy"; 17. "Superman"; 18. "Orion"; 19. "Only Girl"; 20. "R.O.S.E" (remix); 21. "Happy Birthday" (remix)	7	—N/a
Wooyoung (From 2PM) Solo Tour 2017 “Party Shots” in Makuhari Messe	Released: February 28, 2018; Language: Japanese; Performances: 1. "Chill Out"; 2. "Hanpa Nai" (ハンパない); 3. "Going Going"; 4. "Cocktail"; 5. "Superman"; 6. "Yo Moriagatte Yo" (Yo モリアガッテ Yo); 7. "Party Shots"; 8. "Bye Bye My Blue"; 9. "Love Me Again"; 10. "Congratulations"; 11. "Happy Birthday"; 12. "R.O.S.E"; 13. "Giv U Class."; 14. "I Know Your Shirts"; 15. "Where Is She"; 16. "Formula"; 17. "DJ Got Me Goin’ Crazy"; 18. "Souzoushitemite" (想像してみて; Try Your Imagination) (Wooyoung ver.); 19. "Nami" (波); 20. "Humming"; 21. "The Blue Light"; 22. "Party Shots" (remix)	15	—N/a
Wooyoung (From 2PM) Solo Tour 2017 "Mada Boku Wa..." in Nippon Budokan	Released: September 26, 2018; Language: Japanese; Performances: 1. Opening; 2. "The Blue Light"; 3. "More"; 4. "Letting You Go"; 5. "Mada Boku Wa..." (まだ僕は・・・; Same Old); 6. "And End"; 7. "Give Up"; 8. "Only Girl"; 9. "Chill Out"; 10. "Lazy Day"; 11. "Happy Birthday"; 12. "Stand By Me"; 13. "I Can't Breathe"; 14. "Futaridake" (二人だけ); 15. "2Nite"; 16. "Going Going"; 17. DJ Time ("Go Crazy!" (Japanese ver.), "Hands Up", "Formula"); 18. "Superman"; 19. "DJ Got Me Goin' Crazy"; 20. "Party Shots"; 21. "Yo Moriagatte Yo" (Yo モリアガッテ Yo); 22. "Hanpa Nai" (ハンパない); 23. "Souzoushitemite" (想像してみて; Try Your Imagination) (Wooyoung ver.); 24. "Milky Way ~Galaxy~" (天の川 ～Galaxy～) (Wooyoung ver.)	—	—N/a

=== Music videos ===
Title	Year	Album
Korean
"Sexy Lady"	2012	23, Male, Single
"Classic" (with Park Jin-young, Suzy, and Taecyeon)	2012	Reebok Classic promotional single
"R.O.S.E" (Korean ver.)	2015	R.O.S.E
"Still Here" (똑같지 뭐)	2017	Non-album single
"Going Going" (Korean ver.)	2018	Bye (헤어질 때)
"Party Shots" (Korean ver.)	2018	Bye (헤어질 때)
"Quit" (뚝)	2018	Bye (헤어질 때)
"Don't Act"	2018	Bye (헤어질 때)
"Simple Dance"	2025	Non-album single
"Think Too Much" (feat. Damini)	2025	I’m Into
"She Is" (늪)	2025	I’m Into
Japanese
"R.O.S.E."	2015	R.O.S.E
"Happy Birthday"	2015	R.O.S.E
"Party Shots"	2017	Party Shots
"Going Going"	2017	Party Shots
"Mada Boku Wa..." (まだ僕は・・・; Same Old)	2017	Mada Boku Wa... (まだ僕は・・・)
"Off the Record"	2023	Off the Record
"Reason"	2025	3650.zip

== Discography ==
=== Compilation albums ===
Title	Album details	Peak chart positions	Sales
Title	Album details	JPN	Sales
3650.zip	Released: December 24, 2025; Label: Epic Records Japan; Formats: CD, digital download; Track listing: 1. "Reason"; 2. "R.O.S.E"; 3. "Going Going"; 4. "Hanpa Nai" (ハンパない); 5. "Cocktail"; 6. "Season 2"; 7. "Off the Record"; 8. "Futaridake" (二人だけ); 9. "Mada Boku Wa..." (まだ僕は・・・; Same Old); 10. "Happy Birthday"; 11. "Nami" (波); 12. "Milky Way ~Galaxy~" (天の川 ～Galaxy~; Wooyoung ver.); 13. "Give Up"; 14. "Baby" (君の別の名前); 15. "Formula"; 16. "More"; 17. "Party Shots"; 18. "Yo Moriagatte Yo" (Yo モリアガッテ Yo; Wooyoung ver.)	5	JPN: 10,001

=== Extended plays ===
Title	EP details	Peak chart positions			Sales
Title	EP details	KOR	JPN	JPN Hot	Sales
Korean
23, Male, Single	Released: July 8, 2012; Label: JYP Entertainment; Formats: CD, digital download	2	48	—	KOR: 68,462+
Bye (헤어질 때)	Released: January 15, 2018; Label: JYP Entertainment; Formats: CD, digital download; Track listing: 1. "I Like"; 2. "Quit" (뚝); 3. "Don't Act"; 4. "Whatever" (맘껏); 5. "Hey" (얘들아); 6. "Party Shots"; 7. "Going Going"	4	25	—	KOR: 14,467+; JPN: 2,416+
I'm Into	Released: September 15, 2025; Label: JYP Entertainment; Formats: CD, digital download; Track listing: 1. "Carpet"; 2. "Think Too Much" (feat. Damini); 3. "She Is" (늪); 4. "Reality"; 5. "Homecance" (홈캉스)	16	—	—	KOR: 15,142
Japanese
Party Shots	Released: April 19, 2017; Label: Epic Records Japan; Format: CD, digital download; Track listing: 1. "Where Is She"; 2. "Party Shots"; 3. "Going Going"; 4. "Chill Out"; 5. "Formula"; 6. "Party Shots" (instrumental; regular edition); 7. "Nami" (波; Limited Edition B); 8. "Sōzōshitemite" (想像してみて; Try Your Imagination; Wooyoung ver.; Limited Edition B); 9. "Party Shots" (remix; Limited Edition B)	—	2	2	JPN: 35,380+
Mada Boku Wa... (まだ僕は・・・)	Released: October 11, 2017; Label: Epic Records Japan; Format: CD, digital download; Track listing: 1. "Mada Boku Wa..." (まだ僕は・・・; Same Old); 2. "Stand By Me"; 3. "I Can't Breathe"; 4. "Futaridake" (二人だけ); 5. "And End"; 6. "Mada Boku Wa..." (まだ僕は・・・; Same Old) (instrumental; regular edition); 7. "Lazy Day" (Limited Edition B); 8. "More"(Limited Edition B); 9. "Milky Way ~Galaxy~" (天の川 ～Galaxy～; Wooyoung ver.; Limited Edition B); 10. "Nami" (波; 2017 live ver.; fan club-exclusive limited edition)	—	2	2	JPN: 30,706+
Off the Record	Released: June 7, 2023; Label: Epic Records Japan; Format: CD, digital download; Track listing: 1. "From Here"; 2. "Off the Record"; 3. "Season 2"; 4. "Just Be You"; 5. "Baby" (君の別の名前); 6. "Off the Record" (instrumental; fan club-exclusive limited edition)	—	7	6	JPN: 12,143
"—" denotes releases that did not chart or were not released in that region.

=== Single albums ===
Title	Album details	Peak chart positions		Sales
Title	Album details	KOR	JPN	Sales
Korean
R.O.S.E	Released: April 20, 2015; Label: JYP Entertainment; Formats: CD, digital download; Track listing: 1. "R.O.S.E"; 2. "Cocktail"; 3. "Happy Birthday"; 4. "R.O.S.E" (Korean ver.); 5. "Happy Birthday" (Korean ver.); 6. "R.O.S.E" (instrumental); 7. "Cocktail" (instrumental); 8. "Happy Birthday" (instrumental)	4	—	—N/a
Japanese
R.O.S.E	Released: March 4, 2015; Label: Epic Records Japan; Format: CD, digital download; Track listing: 1. "R.O.S.E"; 2. "Happy Birthday"; 3. "Cocktail"; 4. "R.O.S.E" (instrumental); 5. "Happy Birthday" (instrumental); 6. "Cocktail" (instrumental); 7. "I Know Your Shirts" (LP-size limited edition)	—	5	—N/a
"—" denotes releases that did not chart or were not released in that region.

=== Singles ===
Title	Year	Peak chart position		Album
Title	Year	KOR	JPN Hot	Album
Korean
"Sexy Lady"	2012	16	—	23, Male, Single
"R.O.S.E" (Korean ver.)	2015	—	—	R.O.S.E
"Still Here" (똑같지 뭐)	2017	—	—	Non-album single
"Quit" (뚝)	2018	—	—	Bye (헤어질 때)
"Simple Dance"	2025	— (Note: "Simple Dance" did not enter the Circle Digital Chart, but peaked at number 62 on the composite Download Chart.)	—	Non-album single
"Think Too Much" (feat. Damini)	2025	— (Note: "Think Too Much" did not enter the Circle Digital Chart, but peaked at number 96 on the composite Download Chart.)	—	I’m Into
Japanese
"R.O.S.E."	2015	—	9	R.O.S.E
"Party Shots"	2017	—	—	Party Shots
"Mada Boku Wa..." (まだ僕は・・・; Same Old)	2017	—	—	Mada Boku Wa... (まだ僕は・・・)
"Off the Record"	2023	—	—	Off the Record
"Reason"	2025	—	—	3650.zip
"—" denotes releases that did not chart or were not released in that region.

=== Collaborations and covers ===
Title	Year	Peak chart positions	Album
Title	Year	KOR	Album
As lead artist
"Dream High" (with Taecyeon, Suzy, Kim Soo-hyun, and Joo)	2011	41	Dream High OST
"Classic" (with Park Jin-young, Suzy, and Taecyeon)	2012	58	Reebok Classic promotional single
"You Are a Miracle" (with SBS Gayo Daejeon Friendship Project)	2013	32	Non-album single
"Holding Hands Together" (깍지 낀 두 손) (with Park Se-young)	2014	49	We Got Married OST
"Think About' Chu" (song by Asoto Union)	2018	—	Song One (The Song of My Life) – Wooyoung (2PM) Edition
"Never" (as part of Unbalance)	2023	— (Note: "Never" did not enter the Circle Digital Chart, but peaked at number 101 on the composite Download Chart.)	Beat Coin OST
"Naviety" (song by BtoB; with cast of King of Karaoke: VS)	2023	—	King of Karaoke: VS Episode 1
As featured artist
"Fireflies' Glow" (반딧불을 따라서) (Lel feat. Wooyoung)	2014	—	Non-album single
"Flower Brain" (Joo Woo-jae feat. Kim Sook, Hong Jin-kyung, Cho Sae-ho, and Jang Wooyoung)	2026	—	Screwballs OST

=== Compositions ===
All credits are adapted from Korea Music Copyright Association (KMCA) database.

Title	Year	Artist	Album
"Move On"	2012	Junho & Wooyoung	2PM Best: 2008–2011 in Korea
"This is Love"	2013	2PM	Grown (Grand Edition)
"Superman"	2014	Jun. K & Wooyoung	Go Crazy! (Grand Edition)
"Holding Hands Together" (깍지 낀 두 손)	2014	Wooyoung & Park Se-young	We Got Married OST
"Merry-Go-Round"	2014	2PM	Genesis of 2PM
"Give Up"	2014	Wooyoung	Genesis of 2PM (Version B)
"R.O.S.E."	2015	Wooyoung	R.O.S.E
"Happy Birthday"	2015	Wooyoung	R.O.S.E
"Cocktail"	2015	Wooyoung	R.O.S.E
"I Know Your Shirts"	2015	Wooyoung	R.O.S.E
"R.O.S.E." (Korean ver.)	2015	Wooyoung	R.O.S.E
"Happy Birthday" (Korean ver.)	2015	Wooyoung	R.O.S.E
"The Blue Light"	2015	Wooyoung	2PM of 2PM
"Hanpa Nai" (ハンパない)	2015	Wooyoung	Higher (Wooyoung Version)
"Yo Moriagatte Yo" (Yo モリアガッテ Yo)	2016	Got7	Moriagatteyo
"Souzoushitemite" (想像してみて; Try Your Imagination)	2016	2PM	Galaxy of 2PM
"Kanojo" (彼女)	2016	Nichkhun & Wooyoung	Galaxy of 2PM (Limited Edition Ver. C – Nichkhun x Wooyoung Edition)
"Milky Way ~Galaxy~" (天の川 ~Galaxy~)	2016	2PM	Galaxy of 2PM (Repackaged Edition)
"Giv U Class."	2016	2PM	Gentlemen's Game
"Humming" (콧노래)	2016	2PM	Gentlemen's Game
"Over & Over"	2016	Got7	Hey Yah
"Where Is She"	2017	Wooyoung	Party Shots
"Party Shots"	2017	Wooyoung	Party Shots
"Going Going"	2017	Wooyoung	Party Shots
"Chill Out"	2017	Wooyoung	Party Shots
"Formula"	2017	Wooyoung	Party Shots
"Nami" (波)	2017	Wooyoung	Party Shots (Limited Edition B)
"Mada Boku Wa..." (まだ僕は・・・; Same Old)	2017	Wooyoung	Mada Boku Wa... (まだ僕は・・・)
"Stand By Me"	2017	Wooyoung	Mada Boku Wa... (まだ僕は・・・)
"I Can't Breathe"	2017	Wooyoung	Mada Boku Wa... (まだ僕は・・・)
"Futaridake" (二人だけ)	2017	Wooyoung	Mada Boku Wa... (まだ僕は・・・)
"And End"	2017	Wooyoung	Mada Boku Wa... (まだ僕は・・・)
"Lazy Day"	2017	Wooyoung	Mada Boku Wa... (まだ僕は・・・) (Limited Edition B)
"More"	2017	Wooyoung	Mada Boku Wa... (まだ僕は・・・) (Limited Edition B)
"Still Here" (똑같지 뭐)	2017	Wooyoung	Non-album single
"I Like"	2018	Wooyoung	Bye (헤어질 때)
"Quit" (뚝)	2018	Wooyoung	Bye (헤어질 때)
"Don't Act"	2018	Wooyoung	Bye (헤어질 때)
"Whatever" (맘껏)	2018	Wooyoung	Bye (헤어질 때)
"Hey" (얘들아)	2018	Wooyoung	Bye (헤어질 때)
"Party Shots" (Korean ver.)	2018	Wooyoung	Bye (헤어질 때)
"Going Going" (Korean ver.)	2018	Wooyoung	Bye (헤어질 때)
"Make It"	2021	2PM	Must
"The Cafe"	2021	2PM	Must
"Make It" (Japanese ver.)	2021	2PM	With Me Again
"Snacks"	2023	Sugar Pop	Fantasy Boys – Semi Final
"From Here"	2023	Wooyoung	Off the Record
"Off the Record"	2023	Wooyoung	Off the Record
"Season 2"	2023	Wooyoung	Off the Record
"Just Be You"	2023	Wooyoung	Off the Record
"Baby" (君の別の名前)	2023	Wooyoung	Off the Record
"Simple Dance"	2025	Wooyoung	Non-album single
"Carpet"	2025	Wooyoung	I'm Into
"Think Too Much" (feat. Damini)	2025	Wooyoung	I'm Into
"She Is" (늪)	2025	Wooyoung	I'm Into
"Reality"	2025	Wooyoung	I'm Into
"Homecance" (홈캉스)	2025	Wooyoung	I'm Into
"Empty Glass" (비어있는술잔)	2025	Wooyoung	Unreleased song
"Reason"	2025	Wooyoung	3650.zip
"Yo Moriagatte Yo" (Yo モリアガッテ Yo) (Wooyoung ver.)	2025	Wooyoung	3650.zip

== Concerts and fan meetings ==
=== Wooyoung (From 2PM) Japan Premium Showcase Tour 2015 "R.O.S.E" ===
Date	City	Country	Venue	Ref.
February 19, 2015	Nagoya	Japan	Zepp Nagoya	
February 20, 2015	Nagoya	Japan	Zepp Nagoya	
March 2, 2015	Tokyo	Japan	Zepp DiverCity Tokyo	
March 3, 2015	Tokyo	Japan	Zepp DiverCity Tokyo	
March 4, 2015	Tokyo	Japan	Zepp DiverCity Tokyo	
March 5, 2015	Tokyo	Japan	Zepp DiverCity Tokyo	
March 9, 2015	Osaka	Japan	Zepp Namba	
March 10, 2015	Osaka	Japan	Zepp Namba	
March 11, 2015	Osaka	Japan	Zepp Namba	

=== Wooyoung (From 2PM) Solo Tour 2017 "Party Shots" ===
Date	City	Country	Venue	Ref.
April 5, 2017	Sapporo	Japan	Zepp Sapporo	
April 8, 2017	Chiba	Japan	Makuhari Messe	
April 9, 2017	Chiba	Japan	Makuhari Messe	
April 14, 2017	Fukuoka	Japan	Fukuoka Sunpalace	
April 15, 2017	Fukuoka	Japan	Fukuoka Sunpalace	
April 20, 2017	Osaka	Japan	Zepp Namba	
April 21, 2017	Osaka	Japan	Zepp Namba	
April 22, 2017	Osaka	Japan	Zepp Namba	
April 28, 2017	Nagoya	Japan	Zepp Nagoya	
April 29, 2017	Nagoya	Japan	Zepp Nagoya	
April 30, 2017	Tokyo	Japan	Zepp DiverCity Tokyo	

=== Wooyoung (From 2PM) Solo Tour 2017 "Mada Boku Wa..." (まだ僕は・・・) ===
Date	City	Country	Venue	Ref.
September 29, 2017	Nagoya	Japan	Zepp Nagoya	
September 30, 2017	Nagoya	Japan	Zepp Nagoya	
October 1, 2017	Nagoya	Japan	Zepp Nagoya	
October 3, 2017	Fukuoka	Japan	Fukuoka Sunpalace	
October 5, 2017	Tokyo	Japan	Zepp DiverCity Tokyo	
October 6, 2017	Tokyo	Japan	Zepp DiverCity Tokyo	
October 7, 2017	Tokyo	Japan	Zepp DiverCity Tokyo	
October 13, 2017	Osaka	Japan	Zepp Namba	
October 14, 2017	Osaka	Japan	Zepp Namba	
October 15, 2017	Osaka	Japan	Zepp Namba	
October 23, 2017	Tokyo	Japan	Tokyo International Forum	
December 5, 2017	Tokyo	Japan	Nippon Budokan	
December 6, 2017	Tokyo	Japan	Nippon Budokan	

=== Wooyoung Solo Concert "Eh? Call!" (엥? Call!) ===
Date	City	Country	Venue	Ref.
February 9, 2018	Seoul	South Korea	Blue Square Mastercard Hall	
February 10, 2018	Seoul	South Korea	Blue Square Mastercard Hall	
February 11, 2018	Seoul	South Korea	Blue Square Mastercard Hall	
April 5, 2018	Tokyo	Japan	Tokyo Dome City Hall	
April 6, 2018	Tokyo	Japan	Tokyo Dome City Hall	
April 11, 2018	Osaka	Japan	Grand Cube Osaka	
April 12, 2018	Osaka	Japan	Grand Cube Osaka	
April 29, 2018	Busan	South Korea	Busan KBS Hall	

=== Wooyoung (From 2PM) Solo Tour 2023 "Off the Record" ===
Date	City	Country	Venue	Ref.
May 24, 2023	Fukuoka	Japan	Fukuoka Sunpalace	
May 28, 2023	Yokohama	Japan	Pacifico Yokohama	
June 3, 2023	Tokyo	Japan	Nippon Budokan	
June 10, 2023	Osaka	Japan	Orix Theater	
June 11, 2023	Osaka	Japan	Orix Theater	

=== 2024 Jang Wooyoung Fan Meeting "Be Young" ===
Date	City	Country	Venue	Ref.
August 3, 2024	Seoul	South Korea	Blue Square Mastercard Hall	
August 4, 2024	Seoul	South Korea	Blue Square Mastercard Hall	
September 28, 2024	Busan	South Korea	Dream Theatre	
September 29, 2024	Busan	South Korea	Dream Theatre	
December 14, 2024	Osaka	Japan	Orix Theater	
December 15, 2024	Osaka	Japan	Orix Theater	
December 21, 2024	Yokohama	Japan	Pacifico Yokohama	

=== 2025–2026 Jang Wooyoung Concert "Half Half" ===
Date	City	Country	Venue	Ref.
September 27, 2025	Seoul	South Korea	Yes24 Live Hall	
September 28, 2025	Seoul	South Korea	Yes24 Live Hall	
November 29, 2025	Tokyo	Japan	Kanadevia Hall	
November 30, 2025	Tokyo	Japan	Kanadevia Hall	
December 27, 2025	Kobe	Japan	Kobe Bunka Hall	
December 28, 2025	Kobe	Japan	Kobe Bunka Hall	
March 8, 2026	Taipei	Taiwan	Legacy Tera	

=== Other concerts and showcases ===
Date	Title	City	Country	Venue	Ref.
February 24, 2011	Dream High Special Concert	Goyang	South Korea	Arum Nuri Arts Center	
September 4, 2011	Dream High Premium Show Case Live & Special Fan Meeting	Saitama	Japan	Saitama Super Arena	
July 9, 2012	Jang Wooyoung First Mini Album 23, Male, Single Showcase	Seoul	South Korea	Ilchi Art Hall	
April 30, 2022	2PM Jun. K & Wooyoung 2022 Fan-Con "115430"	Seoul	South Korea	Blue Square Mastercard Hall	
May 1, 2022	2PM Jun. K & Wooyoung 2022 Fan-Con "115430"	Seoul	South Korea	Blue Square Mastercard Hall	

== Awards and nominations ==
Name of the award ceremony, year presented, category, nominee of the award, and the result of the nomination
Year	Award	Category	Nominated work	Result	Ref.
2011	25th KBS Drama Awards	Best Couple (with IU)	Dream High	Nominated	
2012	27th Golden Disk Awards	Disk Album Awards	23, Male, Single	Nominated	
2012	27th Golden Disk Awards	MSN Southeast Asia Award	23, Male, Single	Nominated	
2012	27th Golden Disk Awards	MSN International Award	23, Male, Single	Nominated	
2012	27th Golden Disk Awards	MSN Popularity Award	23, Male, Single	Nominated	
2012	2nd SBS MTV Best of the Best Awards	Best Male Soloist	—N/a	Won	
2013	The 1st V Chart Awards	Best Korean New Solo Artist	—N/a	Won	
2022	2022 KBS Entertainment Awards	Rookie Award in Show and Variety Category	Beat Coin	Nominated	
