= 2023 KBS Entertainment Awards =

21st edition of award ceremony

- Official logo
- Awarded for: Excellence in variety entertainment
- Date: December 23, 2023
- Venue: KBS New Wing Open Hall, Yeouido-dong, Yeongdeungpo-gu, Seoul
- Country: South Korea
- Presented by: Korean Broadcasting System
- Hosted by: Shin Dong-yup; Cho Yi-hyun; Joo Woo-jae

Highlights
- Grand Prize: 2 Days & 1 Night Team
- Viewers' Choice Best Program Award: Immortal Songs: Singing the Legend
- Popularity Award: The Return of Superman
- Website: KBS Entertainment Awards

Television/radio coverage
- Network: KBS2, KBS World
- Runtime: Approx. 200 minutes

The 2023 KBS Entertainment Awards presented by Korean Broadcasting System (KBS), took place on December 23, 2023, at KBS New Wing Open Hall in Yeouido-dong, Yeongdeungpo-gu, Seoul. It was hosted by Shin Dong-yup, Cho Yi-hyun, and Joo Woo-jae.

In the award ceremony 2 Days & 1 Night 4 was awarded the Grand Prize, whereas Immortal Songs: Singing the Legend was viewers' choice for Best Program Award.

== Nominations and winners ==
(Winners denoted in bold)

Grand Prize (Daesang)	Viewers' Choice Best Program Award
**2 Days & 1 Night 4 Team**	**Immortal Songs: Singing the Legend**
Top Excellence Award in Reality Category	Top Excellence Award in Show and Variety Category
**Lee Chan-won – Stars' Top Recipe at Fun-Staurant**; **Jasson – The Return of Superman**	**Kim Jun-hyun – Immortal Songs: Singing the Legend**; **Hong Jin-kyung – Beat Coin**
Excellence Award in Reality Category	Excellence Award in Show and Variety Category
**Kim Jun-ho - The Return of Superman**	**Choi Jung-hoon (Jannabi) – The Seasons, The Black Box on Earth**; **Joo Woo-jae – Beat Coin**
Rookie Award
Reality Category	Show and Variety Category
**Jin Seo-yeon – Stars' Top Recipe at Fun-Staurant**; **Ji-seon Jeong – Boss in the Mirror**	**Yoo Seon-ho – 2 Days & 1 Night 4**; **Insooni**; **Park Mi-kyung**; **Shin Hyo-beom**; **Lee Eun-mi** **– Cast of Golden Girls**
DJ Award	Digital Content Award
**Lee Eun-ji – Lee Eunji's Song Plaza**; **Young K– Day6's Kiss the Radio**	**Hong Eun-chae – Eun-chae's Star Diary**
Entertainer of the Year	Best Icon Award
**Lee Chun-soo – Mr. House Husband Season 2**; **Ryu Soo-young – Stars' Top Recipe at Fun-Staurant**; **Park Jin-young – Golden Girls**; **Jeon Hyun-moo – Boss in the Mirror**; **Kim Sook – Boss in the Mirror**; **2 Days & 1 Night 4 Team**; **Shin Dong-yup – Immortal Songs: Singing the Legend**	**Choo Sung-hoon – Boss in the Mirror**; **Lee Mu-jin – LeeMujin Service**
Best Challenger Award	Popularity Award
**YB – The Black Box on Earth**	**Children of The Return of Superman**
Best Teamwork Award	Best Entertainer Award
**Gag Concert**	**Kang Daniel – Mr. House Husband Season 2**
Staff of the Year Award	Broadcast Writer Award
**Nam Byeong-guk** (Technical Director)	**Choi Hye-ran – 2 Days & 1 Night 4**; **Yang Young-mi – Open Concert**
Producer Special Award	Public Broadcasting 50th Anniversary Special Contribution Award
**Boom – Stars' Top Recipe at Fun-Staurant**	**Kim Dong-gun**
Best Couple Award
**Park Jun-hyung and Kim Ji-hye – Mr. House Husband Season 2**; **Lee Chae-min and Hong Eun-chae – Music Bank**

== See also ==
- 2023 MBC Entertainment Awards
- 2023 SBS Entertainment Awards
