= 2022 KBS Entertainment Awards =

20th edition of award ceremony

- Official logo
- Awarded for: Excellence in variety entertainment
- Date: December 24, 2022
- Venue: KBS New Wing Open Hall, Yeouido-dong, Yeongdeungpo-gu, Seoul
- Country: South Korea
- Presented by: Korean Broadcasting System
- Hosted by: Seol In-ah; Moon Se-yoon; Kang Chan-hee

Highlights
- Grand Prize: Shin Dong-yup
- Entertainer of the Year: Kim Sook; Jun Hyun-moo; Kim Jong-min; Lee Kyung-kyu; Shin Dong-yup
- Viewers' Choice Best Program Award: Immortal Songs: Singing the Legend
- Top Excellence Award Reality: Lee Cheon-soo - Mr. House Husband 2; Sayuri - The Return of Superman
- Best Show/Variety: DinDin - 2 Days & 1 Night; Ryu Soo-young - Stars' Top Recipe at Fun-Staurant
- Website: KBS Entertainment Awards

Television/radio coverage
- Network: KBS2, KBS World
- Runtime: Approx. 200 minutes
- Viewership: Ratings: 5.2%; Viewers: 1 million (approximately)
- Produced by: Lee Hwang-seon
- Directed by: Jo Sung-suk; Son Ja-yeon; Kim Hyung-seok

The 2022 KBS Entertainment Awards presented by Korean Broadcasting System (KBS), took place on December 24, 2022, at KBS New Wing Open Hall in Yeouido-dong, Yeongdeungpo-gu, Seoul. The 20th anniversary ceremony was opened with a special performance that looks back on the past KBS entertainment and covers it all. The awards ceremony was broadcast live at KBS Hall at 21.15 (KST). It was hosted by Seol In-ah, Moon Se-yoon and Kang Chan-hee.

This year Immortal Songs: Singing the Legend won the 'Best Program Award', directly selected by viewers. In addition, there was a stage dedicated to the late Song Hae, who has firmly maintained his place as a national song boasting MC. Another highlight of this year's ceremony was stars, who are active in various fields attended as presenters. 7 people united as Kondaz, viz. Heo Jae, Kim Byung-hyun, Kim Jung-tae, Lee Dae-Hyung, Jung Ho-young, Yoo Hee-gwan, and Kwak Beom, performed "Never Ending Story" as 'Special stage'.

Shin Dong-yup won the Grand Prize and Entertainer of the Year award along with Kim Sook, Jun Hyun-moo, Kim Jong-min, and Lee Kyung-kyu.

== Nominations and winners ==
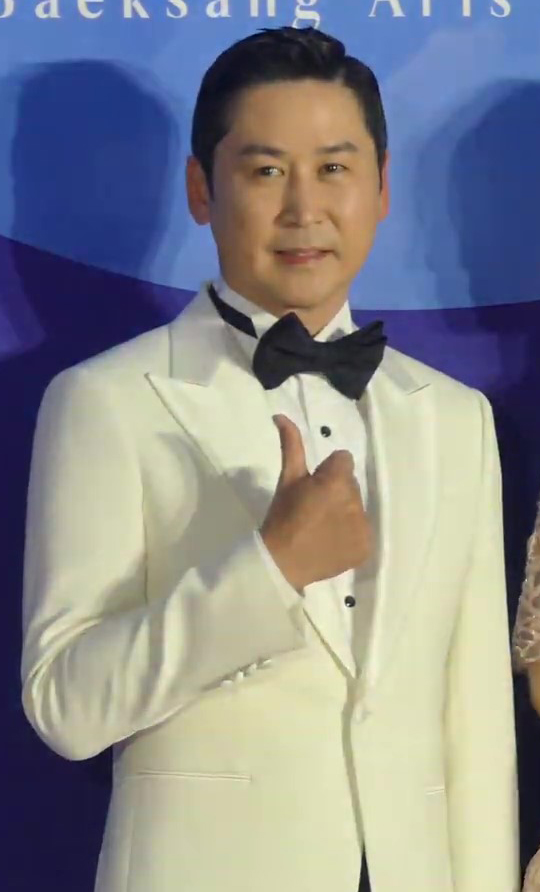
Shin Dong-yup, winner of Grand Prize (Daesang)

(Winners denoted in bold)

Grand Prize (Daesang)	Viewers' Choice Best Program Award
**Shin Dong-yup**; Kim Sook; Jun Hyun-moo; Kim Jong-min; Lee Kyung-kyu	Immortal Songs: Singing the Legend; 2 Days & 1 Night 4; Korea Sings; Boss in the Mirror; Mr. House Husband 2; Stars' Top Recipe at Fun-Staurant; Dogs Are Incredible
Top Excellence Award in Reality Category	Top Excellence Award in Show and Variety Category
**Lee Chun-soo - Mr. House Husband 2**; **Sayuri - The Return of Superman**; Jang Do-yeon and Kang Hyung-wook - Dogs Are Incredible; Hur Jae - Boss in the Mirror	**DinDin - 2 Days & 1 Night**; **Ryu Soo-young - Stars' Top Recipe at Fun-Staurant**; Hong Jin-kyung - Beat Coin; Kim Jun-hyun - Immortal Songs: Singing the Legend; Jang Yoon-jeong - I Like to Sing
Excellence Award in Reality Category	Excellence Award in Show and Variety Category
**Jasson - The Return of Superman**; **Kim Byung-hyun - Boss in the Mirror**; Joo Sang-wook - Second House; Sung Yu-ri - Love Recall; Kang Joo-eun - Godfather	**Kim Shin-young - Korea Sings**; **Lee Chan-won - Stars' Top Recipe at Fun-Staurant, Immortal Songs: Singing the Legend**; Boom - Stars' Top Recipe at Fun-Staurant; Cho Sae-ho - Beat Coin; Yeon Jung-hoon - 2 Days & 1 Night
Producer Special Award	20th Annual Special Achievement Award
**Hur Jae - Boss in the Mirror**	**Song Hae - Korea Sings**
Rookie Award
Reality Category	Show and Variety Category
**Yang Se-hyung - Love Recall**; **Jung Tae-woo - Mr. House Husband 2**; Gabee and Jonathan - Godfather; Lee Mi-joo - Battle Trip 2	**Na In-woo - 2 Days & 1 Night**; Dynamic Duo - Listen-Up; Jang Wooyoung and Joo Woo-jae - Beat Coin; Cha Ye-ryun - Stars' Top Recipe at Fun-Staurant
DJ Award	Digital Content Award
**Lee Gi-kwang - Gayo Plaza**; **Lee Min-hyuk - Kiss the Radio**	**Lee Mu-jin - LeeMujin Service**; **Kim Gu-ra - Guracheol Season 3**
Entertainer of the Year	Best Icon Award
**Kim Sook**; **Shin Dong-yup**; **Jun Hyun-moo**; **Kim Jong-min**; **Lee Kyung-kyu**	**The Return of Superman Children**; **Boss in the Mirror Bosses**
Best Challenger Award	Popularity Award
**Diet team**	**Jannabi - Immortal Songs 2**; **Jang Do-yeon - Dogs Are Incredible**; **Kim Jun-ho - The Return of Superman**
Best Teamwork Award	Best Entertainer Award
**Love Recall team**; **Beat Coin team**	**Cha Ye-ryun - Stars' Top Recipe at Fun-Staurant**; **Yeon Jung-hoon - 2 Days & 1 Night**; **Park Joo-ho - The Return of Superman**
Best Couple Award
**Cho Sae-ho and Joo Woo-jae - Beat Coin**; **Joo Sang-wook and Jo Jae-yoon** - Second House; **Kim Sook and Jonathan** - Godfather; **Ryan S. Jhun and Kim Seung-soo** - Listen-Up

== Presenters ==
Order	Presenter(s)	Award(s)	Ref.
1	Jun Hyun-moo, Song Ga-in	Rookie Award (Reality Category)	
1	Jun Hyun-moo, Song Ga-in	Rookie Award (Show and Variety Category)	
2	Kim Jong-min, Ya Wong-i	Scriptwriter Award	
2	Kim Jong-min, Ya Wong-i	Staff Award	
3	Park So-hyun, Sandara Park	DJ Award	
4	Shortbox (Kim Won-hoon, Uhm Ji-yoon, Jo Jin-sae)	Digital Content Award	
5	Beat Coin (Hong Jin-kyung, Cho Sae-ho, Jang Wooyoung, Joo Woo-jae)	Best Challenger Award	
6	Lee Dae-hwi, Big Naughty	Best Icon Award	
7	Yang Se-hyung, Sung Yu-ri	Popularity Award	
8	Jonathan, Patricia	Best Entertainer Award	
9	Lee Kyung-kyu	Producer Special Award	
10	Kim Gu-ra, Gree	Best Teamwork Award	
11	Kim Jun-ho, Kim Ji-min	Best Couple Award	
12	Shin Dong-yup	20th Annual Special Achievement Award	
13	Jang Do-yeon, Ryu Soo-young	Excellence Award	
14	Kim Sook, Choi Jung-hoon (Jannabi)	Top Excellence Award	
15	Jo Hyun-ah, Joo Sang-wook	Viewers' Choice Best Program Award	
16	Kim Ye-chul, Lee Ha-na	Grand Prize (Daesang)	

== Performances ==
Order	Artiste	Act performed	Ref.
1	Moon Se-yoon, Yoo Seon-ho, DinDin	That That (Originally by PSY)	
2	Baby Singer	Carol Madley	
3	Heo Jae, Kim Byung-hyun, Kim Jung-tae, Kwak Byung Jeong, Ho-young, Yoo Hee-gwan, Lee Dae-hyung	Never Ending Story (Original song Resurrection)	
4	Lee Chan-won	My Life is Ding Dong Dang (Originally by Song Hae)	

== See also ==
- 2022 MBC Entertainment Awards
- 2022 SBS Entertainment Awards
