= Joo Woo-jae =

South Korean actor

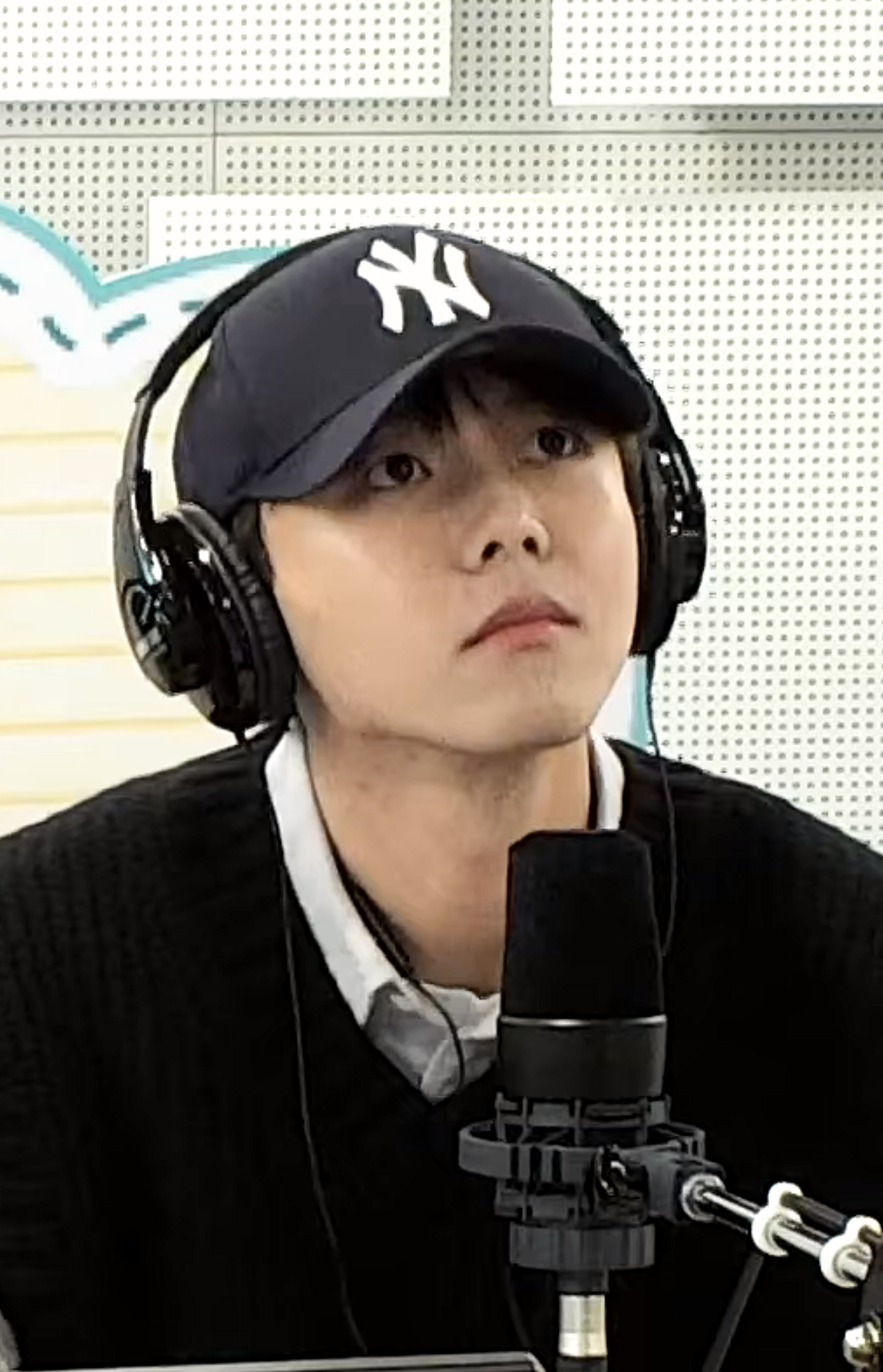
- Joo in 2019
- Born: November 28, 1986 (age 39); Changwon, South Korea
- Occupations: Model; actor
- Years active: 2013–present
- Agent: Cam With Us
- Height: 188.7 cm (6 ft 2 in)

Korean name
- Hangul: 주우재
- RR: Ju Ujae
- MR: Chu Ujae

Joo Woo-jae (Korean: 주우재; born November 28, 1986) is a South Korean model, entertainer and actor. Best known for his roles in Come and Hug Me (2018) and Strong Girl Nam-soon (2023), he currently stars as a regular cast member of Hangout with Yoo (since 2023) and Screwballs (since 2025).

== Life and career ==
=== 1986–2011: Early life ===
Joo Woo-jae was born on November 28, 1986, in Changwon, South Gyeongsang Province, South Korea, as the youngest of two sons. In Changwon Namsan High School, he received "A+" grades in solid mechanics, fluid mechanics, and thermodynamics, and was tested to have an IQ of 137 at the time. For his tertiary education, he studied at Hongik University in Seoul for mechanical engineering with an academic scholarship for ranking within the top 5%, following his father who worked in the automobile industry and older brother who completed his studies in the same department.

=== 2012–2021: Career beginnings and rising popularity ===
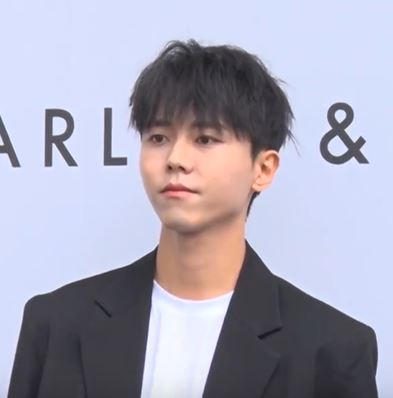
Joo in May 2018

Amidst his studies, Joo was photographed for the cover of a fashion magazine which ranked first place on portal sites, leading to an increase in number of visits on his Cyworld page, and individuals inquiring where his clothes were bought from. With one semester left, Joo requested a leave of absence to enjoy life before graduating and preparing for a job at Samsung. He started an online clothing store for which he modelled and scavenged the styles himself from the Dongdaemun Market, garnering ₩40 million ($40,000) within the first month with men's clothing alone. Established in 2012, its growth led him to become the designer of his clothing brand, SSRL (에스에스알엘) (formerly Siesta). Stemmed from his love for music evoked by the radio since childhood, Joo also bought equipment which included a stereo mix and microphone to broadcast his own radio show through Winamp. Joo worked on his online store during the day, and broadcast his radio show titled "You, Give Me All the Burden" (그대, 모든 짐을 내게), for two hours at midnight. With 1,200 concurrent listeners per broadcast, he was offered to host an offline concert; accepting its offer, Joo programmed the show and invited musicians to guest, including Acoustic Collabo, Cheez, Giriboy, and Nucksal, amidst others, wherein his best outcome garnered 1,200 attendees. Through this, Joo was contacted by a music company and was offered a job at the company, while negotiating the terms with its director, a friend of the CEO of a modelling agency, he introduced Joo to the agency for his height and was hired without an audition.

In April 2025, after YG Entertainment announced it would end its actor management division, Joo signed an exclusive contract with Cam With Us.

== Other ventures ==
=== Philanthropy ===
Joo participated in a retro-themed flea market organized by YG KPlus with models including Kang Seung-hyun, Hwang Seung-eon, Lee Ho-jung, Lee Jin-i, and Shim So-young, for the 2017 Pohang earthquake. Its entire proceed of ₩11.32 million was donated to its respective cause through the National Disaster Relief Association.

== Filmography ==
=== Film ===
Year	Title	Role	Ref.
2016	Can't Hide (숨길 수 없어요)	Woo-jae	
2019	Miss & Mrs. Cops	Lee Phillip	

=== Television series ===
Year	Title	Role	Notes	Ref.
2016	Wanted	Kiss & Talk Guest	Cameo (Episode 1)	
2018	Come and Hug Me	Kang Yoon-sung		
2018	Love Alert	Sung-hoon		
2019	Best Chicken	Andrew Kang		
2019	School Strange Stories: 8th Anniversary	Kang Min-gu		
2020	Please Don't Date Him	Han Yoo-jin		
2023	Strong Girl Nam-soon	Ji Hyun-soo		
2023	My Dearest	Farmer	Cameo (Episode 12)	

=== Web series ===
Year	Title	Role	Notes	Ref.
2015	We Broke Up	Radio DJ	Cameo (Episode 8)	
2016	I'm Not a Girl Anymore	Han Seung-joon		
2017	Part-Time Idol	Inkigayo MC	Cameo (Episode 5)	
2021	Peng	Ki Seon-je		

=== Television shows ===
Year	Title	Role	Notes	Ref.
2016	Travel Without Manager (매니저 없이 떠나는 여행 시즌)	Regular cast	Season 2 (Episodes 3–8)	
2016	Tribe of Hip Hop	Contestant	Season 2	
2016	King of Mask Singer	Contestant	Episode 89	
2018–2021	Love Naggers (연애의 참견)	Host	Seasons 1–4	
2019	Love Me Actually (호구의 연애)	Regular cast	Episode 9–20	
2019–2020	Problematic Men	Regular cast	Guest (Episodes 66, 68–69, 77); Regular (Episodes 212–224)	
2020	Wanna Be Singers (내 안의 발라드)	Contestant		
2021–2022	Magic Wardrobe (마법옷장)	Host	Seasons 1–2	
2022	Local Dining Table (로컬 식탁)	Host		
2022	With the Silk of Dohpo Flying (도포자락 휘날리며)	Regular cast		
2022	Young and Rich Boss (돈 잘 버는 젊은 사장)	Host		
2022	While You Are Tempted (당신이 혹하는 사이)	Host	Season 4	
2022–2024	Beat Coin	Regular cast		
2023	Blue Marble World Tour (지구마불 세계여행)	Host		
2023	Hangout with Yoo	Regular cast	Guest (Episodes 183–184); Regular (Episodes 191–present)	
2025–present	Screwballs	Regular cast		
2025–present	Problem Child in House Season 2	Regular cast		

=== Web shows ===
Year	Title	Role	Notes	Ref.
2021	Top Seller (탑셀러)	Host		
2022	Love Catcher in Bali (러브캐처 인 발리)	Host	Season 4	
2022	Scene Catchers (씬캐처)	Host		
2023	Ripped from a Manga (만찢남)	Regular cast		
2023	Bbam Bbam Social Club (빰빰사교클럽)	Regular cast	YouTube series; 7 episodes	

=== Hosting ===
Year	Title	Notes	Ref.
2023	KBS Entertainment Awards	with Shin Dong-yup and Cho Yi-hyun	

=== Music video appearances ===
Year	Song title	Artist	Ref.
2015	"We Fought" (우리 싸웠어) (with Haeyong of Almeng and Dahye of Bestie)	Yoo Se-yoon	
2015	"Middle School Sick" (중 2병) (with Jay Park and Niihwa)	Yoo Se-yoon	
2016	"Y.O.U" (featuring Park Kyung of Block B)	Johan Kim	
2016	"First" (처음) (with Minseo)	Yoon Jong-shin	

=== Radio shows ===
Year	Title	Role	Ref.
2014–2015	Yoo In-na's Volume Up	Panelist	

== Discography ==
=== Singles ===
Title	Year	Album
"Never" (with Kim Sook, Hong Jin-kyung, Cho Sae-ho, and Jang Wooyoung, together as Unbalance)	2023	Beat Coin OST
"Flower Brain" (feat. Kim Sook, Hong Jin-kyung, Cho Sae-ho, and Jang Wooyoung)	2026	Screwballs OST

== Awards and nominations ==
Name of the award ceremony, year presented, category, nominee of the award, and the result of the nomination
Award ceremony	Year	Category	Nominee / Work	Result	Ref.
Asia Model Awards	2019	Rookie of the Year Award	Joo Woo-jae	Won	
Asia Model Awards	2020	Fashionista Award	Joo Woo-jae	Won	
Blue Dragon Series Awards	2024	Best New Male Entertainer	Witch Hunt 2023	Nominated	
Blue Dragon Series Awards	2026	Best Male Entertainer (Excellence Award)	Screwballs	Won	
Brand of the Year Awards	2022	Model-tainer	Joo Woo-jae	Won	
KBS Entertainment Awards	2022	Best Couple Award	with Jo Se-ho (Beat Coin)	Won	
KBS Entertainment Awards	2022	Rookie Award in Show and Variety Category	Beat Coin	Nominated	
KBS Entertainment Awards	2023	Excellence Award in Show and Variety Category	Beat Coin	Won	
KBS Entertainment Awards	2025	Top Excellence Award in Show and Variety	Beat Coin	Won	
KCA Culture and Entertainment Awards	2023	Popular Star of the Year (Selected by Viewers)	Hangout with Yoo	Won	
Korea First Brand Awards	2020	Model-tainer	Joo Woo-jae	Won	
Korea First Brand Awards	2024	Most Anticipated Model-Entertainer	Joo Woo-jae	Won	
MBC Entertainment Awards	2023	Best Couple Award	with Mijoo (Hangout with Yoo)	Nominated	
MBC Entertainment Awards	2023	Popularity Award	One Top (Note: Formed for the "JS Entertainment" segment of Hangout with Yoo with Yoo Jae-suk, Haha, Lee Yi-kyung, Young K, Kim Jong Min, and Joo Woo-jae)	Won	
MBC Entertainment Awards	2023	Excellence Award — Variety Shows	Hangout with Yoo	Won	
MBC Entertainment Awards	2024	Best Entertainer Award — Show / Variety	Hangout with Yoo; Save Me! Holmes	Won	
