= 23, Male, Single =

- Cover of the Gold Edition of the extended play.

EP by Jang Wooyoung
- Released: July 8, 2012
- Genre: K-pop
- Length: 24:49
- Language: Korean
- Label: JYP Entertainment

23, Male, Single is the debut solo extended play by South Korean singer Jang Wooyoung of boy band 2PM. It was released by JYP Entertainment on July 8, 2012.

== Background ==
Jang held his debut solo performance at the 2012 Mnet 20's Choice Awards ceremony on June 28 with "2Nite" and "Sexy Lady". The extended play was released on July 8 along with a music video for the title track "Sexy Lady". The following day, Jang presented songs from the EP during a solo showcase at the Arum Nuri Arts Center, which was also live-streamed on YouTube.

"Sexy Lady" is a dance track produced by Park Jin-young, while "Only Girl" is a song dedicated to fans. The tracks "DJ Got Me Goin' Crazy" and "Be With You" are composed and written by fellow 2PM members Jun. K and Junho respectively.

== Track listing ==
No.	Title	Lyrics	Music	Length
1.	"2Nite"	Deez	Deez	3:16
2.	"Sexy Lady"	Park Jin-young	Park Jin-young	3:50
3.	"DJ Got Me Goin' Crazy" (featuring Jun. K)	Jun. K, Super Changddai	Jun. K, Super Changddai	3:47
4.	"Be With You"	Junho	Junho, Hong Ji-sang	3:43
5.	"Falling Down"	Hong Ji-sang, Lee Woo-min "Collapsedone"	Hong Ji-sang, Lee Woo-min "Collapsedone"	3:40
6.	"Letting You Go" (시작도 없던 것처럼; Sijakdo eobtdeon geotcheoreom)	Hong Ji-sang, Lee Woo-min "Collapsedone"	Hong Ji-sang, Lee Woo-min "Collapsedone"	3:16
7.	"Only Girl"	Kim Eun-soo	Park Ji-ho	3:17
Total length:				26:38

== Charts ==
Country	Chart	Peak chart positions	Sales
South Korea	Gaon Weekly Albums Chart	2	KOR: 68,462+
South Korea	Gaon Monthly Albums Chart	3	KOR: 68,462+
South Korea	Gaon Year-End Albums Chart	24	KOR: 68,462+
Japan	Oricon Albums Chart	48	
