= Song Hae =

South Korean TV host and singer (1927–2022)

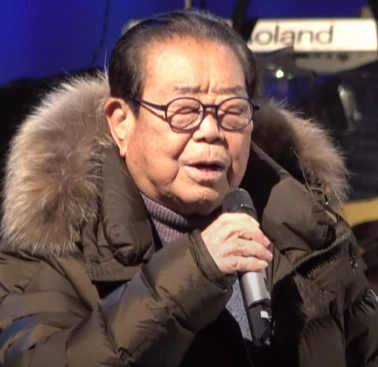
- Song in 2019
- Born: Song Bok-hee; 27 April 1927; Sainei, Kōkai-dō, Korea, Empire of Japan
- Died: 8 June 2022 (aged 95); Seoul, South Korea
- Education: Haeju Arts School, Hwanghae-do – Dept. of Vocal Music (dropped out)
- Occupations: TV host; singer; comedian
- Years active: 1949–2022
- Spouse: Suk Ok-ee (m. 1953; died 2018)

Korean name
- Hangul: 송해
- Hanja: 宋海
- RR: Song Hae
- MR: Song Hae

Birth name
- Hangul: 송복희
- Hanja: 宋福熙
- RR: Song Bokhui
- MR: Song Pokhŭi

Song Bok-hee (Korean: 송복희; 27 April 1927 – 8 June 2022), also known professionally as Song Hae (Korean: 송해), was a South Korean television music show host and singer. He had been the host of the longest running music show National Singing Contest from 1988 until his death in 2022, and was also a veteran of the Korean War.

== Early life ==
Song Bok-hee was born on 27 April 1927 in modern-day Chaeryŏng-gun, South Hwanghae Province in North Korea. His family was part of the Yeosan Song clan. Song started as a singer who majored in operatic singing in Haeju conservatory of music in 1949.

During the Korean War, he fled via boat to the south, arriving in the port of Busan. He later used the stage name, Hae (meaning sea), as a memory of this voyage. Song served as a military signaller for the South, and claimed to have transmitted the message for the ceasefire of the Korean War.

== Career ==
In 1955, Song Hae debuted in the Changgong musical troupe. In 1988, at the age of 60, Song became the MC for Korea Sings (National Singing Contest) of KBS, a position he held until his death in 2022.

== Personal life and death ==
In 1953, Song married his wife, Suk Ok-ee. In 1986, his son Chang-jin (1966–1986) was killed in a bike accident on the Hannam Bridge. On 20 January 2018, Ok-ee died.

Song died at his home in Gangnam of Seoul on 8 June 2022, aged 95. He was cremated at a crematory in Gimcheon and his ashes were buried at the family cemetery nearby Songhae Park (Korean: 송해공원) in Daegu on June 10, 2022.

== Filmography ==
=== Television shows ===
| Year | Title | Role | Notes | Ref. |
|---|---|---|---|---|
| 1988–2022 | Korea Sings | MC | | |
| 2021 | The Age of Destiny | Cast member | | |

=== Film ===
| Year | Title | Role | Notes | Ref. |
|---|---|---|---|---|
| 2021 | Songhae 1927 | himself | documentary film | |

== Awards and honors ==
| Year | Award-giving body | Category | Nominated work | Ref. |
|---|---|---|---|---|
| 2001 | Korean Entertainment Art Awards | Grand Prize (Daesang) | —N/a | |
| 2008 | Baeksang Arts Awards | Lifetime Achievement Award | —N/a | |
| 2010 | Korea Communications Commission | Achievement Award | —N/a | |
| 2014 | Korean Popular Culture and Arts Awards | Order of Cultural Merit | —N/a | |
| 2015 | KBS Entertainment Awards | Best Couple | Look at Me (with Jo Woo-jong) | |
| 2016 | Korean Producer Awards | TV Host Award | —N/a | |
| 2022 | Guinness World Records | Oldest TV Music Talent Show Host | —N/a | |
| 2022 | 47th Korea Broadcasting Prizes | Judge's Special Award | —N/a | |
| 2022 | KBS Entertainment Awards | 20th Anniversary Special Achievement Award | Korea Sings | |
