= The Miracle (2013 film) =

2013 South Korean television film

- Taemin and Minah at a shot of 'The Miracle'
- Starring: Taemin; Bang Min-ah; Jang Wooyoung; Son Na-eun
- Country of origin: South Korea
- Original language: Korean

Production
- Running time: 16 minutes

Original release
- Release: December 29, 2013

The Miracle is a South Korean 16-minute short film starring Taemin and Bang Min-ah, which parodies TV series Master's Sun and The Heirs. It aired on SBS on 29 December 2013 during the SBS Gayo Daejeon.

== Plot ==
Tae Gong-shil (Son Na-eun) gets the request from ghosts to find a way to warm the hearts of everyone in the world. With the help of Kang Woo (Seo In-guk), who introduces her to Kim Tan (Taemin), Tae Gong-shil is able get the help of Cha Eun-sang (Minah). Cha Eun-sang asks the question "When do people's hearts become warm?" on her social network account. This question spreads online and various characters and idols answer in different ways that music warms their hearts. Kim Tan, Cha Eun-sang, Joo Joong-won (Jang Wooyoung), and Tae Gong-shil recruit the help of famous composer Kim Hyung-suk, as well as Yoon Chan-young (Kang Min-hyuk) and Lee Bo-na (Krystal) to form the "You Make Miracle-2013 Friendship Project".

== Cast ==
Actor	Role
Main characters
Taemin	as Kim Tan
Bang Min-ah	as Cha Eun-sang
Jang Wooyoung	as Joo Jong-won
Son Na-eun	as Tae Gong-shil
Supporting characters
Seo In-guk	as Kang Woo
Krystal Jung	as Lee Bo-na
Kang Min-hyuk	as Yoon Chan-young
K.Will	as Choi Young-do
