= With You (South Korean TV series) =

- With You Posters
- Genre: Reality television, Variety
- Written by: Kim Sung-won, Jeong Su-jeong, Kim Eun-young, Seong Mi-jeong, Lee Jeong-hui, Yu Hye-jin, Jo Sung-hee
- Starring: Yoon Jung-soo; Kim Sook; Kim Young-chul; Song Eun-i
- Country of origin: South Korea
- Original language: Korean
- No. of seasons: 2
- No. of episodes: 167

Production
- Producers: Seong Chi-gyeong, Choe Yu-cheong, Kim Ki-jin, Noh Ye-jeong, Kim Dong-hwi, Lee Jun-hui, Lee Byeong-ho
- Running time: 60 minutes

Original release
- Network: JTBC
- Release: January 27, 2014 – September 26, 2017

With You (Korean: 님과 함께) was a 2014 South Korean television program that shows the perspective of couples in late marriages. It aired on JTBC on Tuesdays at 21:30 (KST). Starting from the second season the show changed its name to With You Season 2: The Greatest Love (님과 함께 시즌2 - 최고의 사랑).

== Season 1 ==
=== Couples ===
- Lee Young-ha & Park Chan-sook (episodes 1–15)
- Ji Sang-ryeol & Park Jun-keum (episodes 16–47)
- Im Hyun-sik & Park Won-sook (episodes 1–24)
- Lee Sang-min & Sayuri Fujita (episodes 27–47)
- Kim Bum-soo & Ahn Moon-sook (episodes 32–47)

== Season 2 ==
=== Couples ===
- Kim Bum-soo & Ahn Moon-sook (episodes 1–23)
- Jang Seo-hee & Yoon Gun (episodes 1–23)
- Guillaume Patry & Song Min-seo (episodes 24–36)
- Yoon Jung-soo & Kim Sook (episode 24–120)
- Heo Kyung-hwan & Oh Na-mi (episodes 37–77)
- Seo In-young & Crown J (Episode 78–90)
- Yoo Min-sang & Lee Su-ji (Episode 91–103)
- Kim Young-chul & Song Eun-i (episode 102–120)

=== Guests ===
Season 2 Guests

Guests	Episode(s)
Lee Kyeong-ae	5–6, 21–22
Lee Kyeong-shil	5–6, 21–22
Sayuri	5–6
Im Hyun-sik	6–8
Ahn Sun-yeong	7–9
Lee Chae-young	7–9
Park Jun-geum	8–9
Lady Jane	9
Jo Jung-chi	14–15, 21
Choi Jung-in	14–15, 21
Sunwoo Yong-nyeo	15–16
Park Mi-sun	15–16
Lee Eui-jung	15–16
Wax	17
Kim Chang-ryeol	18–19
Bae Ki-sung	18–19
Lee Kwang-gi	19–20
Cho Hyun-gi	21–22
Lee Sang-min	21–22
Sam Okyere	24–25
Julian Quintart	24–25
Alberto Mondi	24–25
Robin Deiana	24–25
Daniel Lindemann	24–25
Yoo Se-yoon	24–25
Hwan Ji-yeong	36–37
Heo Anna	36–37
Kim Young-hee	37
Park Hong-soo	38–39, 51–52, 84–85
Hwang Seok-jeong	38–39, 51–52
Lee Seong-mi	41
Shin Bong-sun	43–44
Park Ji-sun	43–44
Kim Min-kyung	44, 75, 91, 97–98
Song Eun-i	44–45
Kim Young-chul	45, 74
Lee Guk-joo	45
Park Na-rae	45
Ahn Young-mi	45
Jang Mi-kwan	45
Yoon Sang-hyun	46
Jang Dong-min	46–47
Navi	46–47
Kim Ji-min	46–47, 62–63
Yoon Hyung-bin	51
Jeong Kyeong-mi	51
I.O.I	55–56

Guests	Episode(s)
Shin Bora	58–59, 67–69
Park Sung-kwang	58–59, 62–63, 67–69, 91, 115
Im Hyung-joon	60
No Yoo-min (NRG)	60
Kim Soo-yong	60, 84–85, 102, 106–107
Yoon Park	62–63
Lee Soo-ji	63, 75
Old House, New House cast	64
V.O.S	66
Jang Do-yeon	67–69
Lee Sang-joon	67–69
Sunwoo Sun	68, 77–78
Hong Seok-cheon	68, 77–78
Lee Ji-hye	69
DinDin	69
Seo In-young	70–71
Crown J	70–71
Lee Kyung-kyu	73, 102
Kim Yong-man	73, 102
Kim Jun-ho	74
Baek Ji-young	74
Park So-yeong, Heo Min, Seong Hyun-joo	75
Kim Ga-yeon & Lim Yo-hwan	76
Wax	77–78
Henry	78
Son Hun-su	84–85
Kim Jun-hyun	92
Noh Sa-yeon	93
Yang Hee-eun	94
Shim Hyung-tak	97–98
Lee Si-eon	97–98
Jo Soo-yeon	97–98
Jang Woo-hyuk	99
Nam Chang-hee	99
Bae Ki-sung	99
Ji Sang-ryeol	99
Yoo Jae-suk & Jo Se-ho	102
Choi Hwa-jung	102
Knowing Bros cast + PSY	102
Hwangbo	111–112
Kim Shin-young	111–112
Sean Lee (bodybuilder)	112
Ha Jae-sook	114–115
Kim Saeng-min	116

=== Ratings ===
In the ratings below, the highest rating for the show will be in red, and the lowest rating for the show will be in blue each year.

Ratings 2015

Episode #	Original airdate	AGB ratings
26	October 22, 2015	2.172%
27	October 29, 2015	2.050%
28	November 5, 2015	2.213%
29	November 12, 2015	2.515%
30	November 19, 2015	2.411%
31	November 26, 2015	2.055%
32	December 8, 2015	2.629%
33	December 15, 2015	3.201%
34	December 22, 2015	3.116%
35	December 29, 2015	2.031%

Ratings 2016

Episode #	Original airdate	AGB ratings
36	January 5, 2016	2.970%
37	January 12, 2016	3.971%
38	January 19, 2016	4.459%
39	January 26, 2016	4.418%
40	February 2, 2016	4.641%
41	February 9, 2016	4.620%
42	February 16, 2016	5.091%
43	February 23, 2016	4.791%
44	March 1, 2016	4.878%
45	March 8, 2016	3.806%
46	March 15, 2016	4.471%
47	March 22, 2016	2.862%
48	March 29, 2016	3.639%
49	April 5, 2016	3.629%
50	April 12, 2016	3.455%
51	April 19, 2016	3.708%
52	April 26, 2016	3.977%
53	May 3, 2016	4.068%
54	May 10, 2016	3.728%
55	May 17, 2016	3.043%
56	May 24, 2016	2.972%
57	May 31, 2016	3.271%
58	June 7, 2016	3.697%
59	June 14, 2016	3.855%
60	June 21, 2016	3.209%
61	June 28, 2016	3.254%
62	July 5, 2016	3.751%
63	July 12, 2016	2.733%
64	July 19, 2016	3.239%
65	July 26, 2016	2.886%
66	August 2, 2016	3.276%
67	August 9, 2016	3.220%
68	August 16, 2016	4.627%
69	August 23, 2016	3.138%
70	August 30, 2016	4.384%
71	September 13, 2016	2.857%
72	September 20, 2016	2.830%
73	September 27, 2016	3.832%
74	October 4, 2016	3.168%
75	October 11, 2016	3.364%
76	October 18, 2016	3.396%
77	October 25, 2016	3.878%
78	November 1, 2016	3.541%
79	November 8, 2016	3.401%
80	November 22, 2016	3.618%
81	November 29, 2016	3.523%
82	December 6, 2016	3.697%
83	December 13, 2016	3.040%
84	December 20, 2016	3.661%
85	December 27, 2016	3.431%

Ratings 2017

Episode #	Original airdate	AGB ratings
86	January 3, 2017	3.008%
87	January 10, 2017	3.234%
88	January 17, 2017	3.546%
89	January 24, 2017	4.303%
90	January 31, 2017	3.735%
91	February 7, 2017	4.091%
92	February 14, 2017	4.021%
93	February 21, 2017	3.413%
94	February 28, 2017	3.408%
95	March 14, 2017	2.932%
96	March 21, 2017	2.968%
97	April 4, 2017	3.732%
98	April 11, 2017	2.645%
99	April 18, 2017	3.328%
100	May 2, 2017	2.664%
101	May 16, 2017	3.094%
102	May 23, 2017	4.314%
103	May 30, 2017	4.608%
104	June 6, 2017	4.571%
105	June 13, 2017	3.052%
106	June 20, 2017	3.260%
107	June 27, 2017	4.064%
108	July 4, 2017	3.009%
109	July 11, 2017	3.476%
110	July 18, 2017	3.794%
111	July 25, 2017	4.263%
112	August 1, 2017	4.055%
113	August 8, 2017	3.556%
114	August 15, 2017	3.889%
115	August 22, 2017	3.689%
116	August 29, 2017	4.852%
117	September 5, 2017	3.378%
118	September 12, 2017	4.056%
119	September 19, 2017	3.778%
120	September 26, 2017	5.337%
