= Hong Jin-kyung =

South Korean actress (born 1977)

- 홍진경
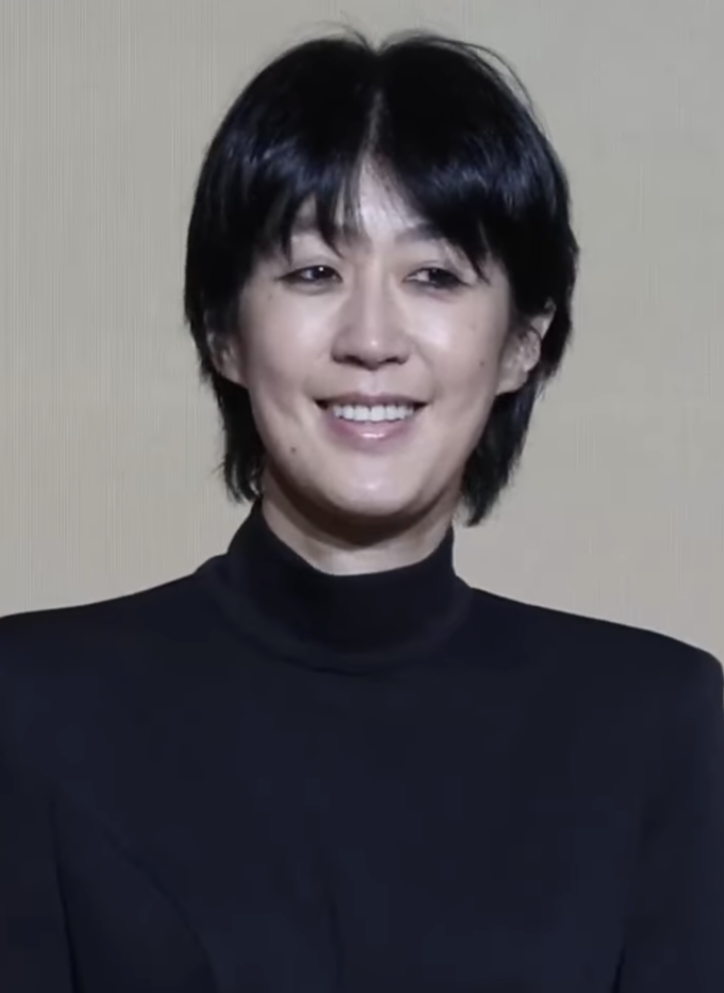
- Hong in January 2026
- Born: December 23, 1977 (age 48)
- Education: Jeongeui Girl's High School; Dongguk University
- Occupations: Entrepreneur; model; host; comedian; actress
- Years active: 1993–present
- Agent: TN Entertainment
- Spouse: Unknown (m. 2003; div. 2025)
- Children: 1

Korean name
- Hangul: 홍진경
- Hanja: 洪眞慶
- RR: Hong Jingyeong
- MR: Hong Chin'gyŏng
- Website: Instagram; Youtube; The Kimchi

Hong Jin-kyung (Korean: 홍진경, born December 23, 1977) is a South Korean entrepreneur, model, host, comedian and actress. She is a host of the Netflix dating show Single's Inferno and has been a cast member on several Korean variety shows such as Sister's Slam Dunk and Beat Coin.

== Career ==
Hong Jin-kyung was born as the eldest of two children (one son and one daughter). In 1993, during her first year of high school, she made her debut in the entertainment industry by receiving the Best Pose Award at the 2nd SBS Supermodel Contest.

Although she began her career as a model, Hong gained significant recognition after appearing as a guest on a variety show, where she stood out as a witty and charismatic host. This led her to become more active as a show MC rather than continuing solely as a model. Her comedic talents propelled her to stardom, and as her popularity grew, she also found great success in the modeling industry.

In 2004, Hong founded a food company called "Hong Jin-kyung Co., Ltd." and launched a kimchi business. Over time, the product line expanded to include dumplings, japchae, galbi, gomguk, doenjang, gochujang, and various sauces. Her products have been sold on major Korean home shopping channels such as CJ, GS, Hyundai, and Home&Shopping. The company maintained the No. 1 spot in online kimchi sales for an extended period.

In 2021, Hong Jin-kyung launched a YouTube channel titled "Study King Jin Genius" (공부왕 찐천재). As of 2025, the channel has surpassed 1.7 million subscribers. It has become widely popular both domestically and internationally.

The channel features a diverse lineup of high-profile guests, including presidential candidates, K-pop superstars such as Blackpink, Aespa, as well as legendary Hallyu figures like Lee Young-ae of Dae Jang Geum (Jewel in the Palace) fame.

Since the 2010s, Hong has been recognized as a versatile entertainer, active across all areas of the entertainment industry. Her work spans modeling, comedy, TV hosting, radio DJing, acting, and even singing, as seen in her participation in the project girl groupUnnies.

Hong is also known for her philanthropic efforts. Since 2005, she has been supporting Yeomyung School, a shelter and educational facility for North Korean defectors. She has donated funds and supplies to a total of 12 organizations, including childcare centers, youth study rooms and shelters, UNICEF, and World Vision. Her efforts include vocational training sponsorships for orphans in South Korea and monthly donations to support 30 children and their communities across Asia.

In early 2012, she established a daycare center named "Rael Daycare" in Doba, Chad, Africa, named after her daughter Rael. In 2025, she launched a campaign with World Vision to help protect young girls in Africa from early and forced marriages.

== Radio host ==
Channel	Title
KBS 2FM	Hong Jin-kyung's Gayo Plaza (홍진경의 가요광장)
KBS 2FM	Hong Jin-kyung at 2 O'Clock (홍진경의 2시)
MBC FM4U	Date at 2 O'Clock (두 시의 데이트)

== Filmography ==
=== Television shows ===
Year	Title	Role	Note(s)	Ref.
2014	Magic Eye	Guest		
2014	Fashion King Korea	Guest		
2015	Infinite Challenge	Herself	Ep. 416–417, 420–424, 446, 448–451, 540	
2015	Off to School	Guest		
2015	Non-Summit	Guest	Ep. 59	
2015	My Little Television	Webcast Host	Ep. 5–6	
2015	Dignity of a Meal	Guest		
2015	Show Me Your Receipt	Guest		
2016	Sister's Slam Dunk	Cast Member		
2016	2016 Hope TV SBS	Guest	Ep. 309–310	
2017	Sister's Slam Dunk 2	Cast Member		
2017	Differentiated Class	Cast Member		
2017	Change the Class	Cast Member		
2018	Ball Red	Cast Member		
2018	My Friend's Blind Date	Cast Member		
2019	Job Heaven: Good Job	Cast Member		
2019	Funstaurant	Guest		
2020	Friday Joy Package	Cast Member		
2020	All the Butlers	Guest	Ep. 125	
2020	My First Social Life	Cast Member		
2020	Want to Be Hot Again: Aero Couple	Cast Member		
2021	Love Affair	Host		
2021	Hong Jin-kyung's Glorious Devotee Life	Host		
2021	Love Affair 2	Host		
2021	I Need a Woman's Romance	Host		
2021	Together with Korean Alphabet	Cast Member	Chucheok Special	
2021	Vegetables District	Host	with Jung Jae-hyung	
2021	Mama The Idol	Comeback Summon Squad		
2021	Single's Inferno	Host		
2022	School of Capitalism	Host		
2022	Daughter Thieves	Host		
2022	Things Are Suspicious These Days	Host	with Lee Kyung-kyu and Jeong Se-woon	
2022	Routine King	Host	with Jang Sung-kyu	
2022	Single's Inferno 2	Host		
2022–2024	Beat Coin	Cast Member		
2023	Anbang Judge	Lawyer		
2023	Korean Food Tray	Cast Member	with Chef Lee Yeon-bok and Monsta X's Joohoney	
2023	Tight Wallet Club	Cast Member		
2023	Three-way House	Cast Member		
2023	Single's Inferno 3	Host		
2024	A Fine Line: Psychomentary	Cast Member		
2024	Hong Judge vs. Judge	Cast Member		
2024	Talkback	Cast Member		
2024	Over-Immersed Life Season 2	Cast Member		
2024	Reasonable Architecture	Cast Member		
2024	Liberal Arts vs. Science, Amazing Proof	Cast Member		
2024	My Name is Gabriel	Cast Member		
2025	All Grown Up, But Still Living at Home	Cast Member		
2025	Single's Inferno 4	Host		
2025–present	Screwballs	Cast Member		
2026	Single's Inferno 5	Host		

=== Television series & film ===
Year	Title	Role
2016	Hong Jinkyung Show: Was Will (내일도 미래라면)	Writer & Main Lead
2013–2014	My Love from the Star	Hong Hye-in / Hong Bok-ja
2016–2017	The Legend of the Blue Sea	Homeless woman who can't give up fashion
2024	Queen of Tears	Private Investigator

=== Commercials ===
Year	Brand/Company	Product/Campaign description
1993	Haitai Confectionery	Woorittorae
1994	Micro Touch	Sharp mechanical pencil
1995	Benetton	Fashion campaign
1995	Crown Confectionery	Pizza Twister
1995	Lotte Foods	Ggoshimang, Banabana, Matta Moa Spaghetti, Sugar-free Vegetable Mix
1995	Unicos Cosmetics	Propose Unique Mascara
1995	Kolon Pharmaceuticals	Bicogreen
1996	Shinsung E&F	I&BU (INBU) apparel campaign
1996	Lotte Chilsung	Red Jujube beverage
1996	Shinsung Distribution	Privite
1997	Sam-A Pharmaceutical	C-Pocket
1998	Korea Gas Safety Corporation	Gas safety campaign
1999	Ministry of Information and Communication	Mobile Phone Etiquette Campaign (with Yoo Jae-suk, Kang Ho-dong, Jung Sun-hee)
1999	Halla Construction	Vivaldi Apartments, Ilsan
1999	Ottogi	Yul Ramen (Cup) (with Joo Young-hoon)
2002	RUJeans	Fashion campaign
2008	1636	Mobile service campaign
2012	Avent Korea	Song ReV baby care line
2016	KT (Korea Telecom)	Call Manager app
2016	Sesaliving	Home living products
2016	Amorepacific	Innisfree Orchid skincare line
2017	Innisfree	Cosmetics campaign
2017	Samsung Electronics	Samsung Pay
2019	Douzone	WEHAGO business platform
2021–2022	Megastudy Education	Elly High (엘리하이) online learning
2021	Kahi	Beauty Balm
2021	Ahn-Guk Pharmaceuticals	Tobicom eye supplement
2022	SK Telecom	Atozem allergy medicine
2022	Wadiz Store	Online shopping platform
2022	HK Inno.N	Scalpmed hair care
2024	Kolon	Couronne (handbag & accessories)
2025	Radiwell	Health and wellness campaign

== Discography ==
=== Singles ===
==== As part of Unnies ====
Title	Year	Peak chart positions		Sales	Album
Title	Year	KOR	US World	Sales	Album
"Shut Up" (feat. You Hee-yeol)	2016	3	—	KOR: 724,088+	Non-album singles
"Right?" (맞지?)	2017	2	10	KOR: 953,036+	Non-album singles
"Lalala Song" (랄랄라 송)	2017	48	22	KOR: 96,638+	Non-album song
"—" denotes releases that did not chart or were not released in that region.

==== Soundtrack appearances ====
Title	Year	Album
"Never" (with Kim Sook, Cho Sae-ho, Joo Woo-jae, and Jang Wooyoung, together as Unbalance)	2023	Beat Coin OST
"Flower Brain" (Joo Woo-jae feat. Kim Sook, Hong Jin-kyung, Cho Sae-ho, and Jang Wooyoung)	2026	Screwballs OST

== Ambassadorship ==
Year	Organization	Role
2007	Little Jesus Society (Parvus Jesus Society)	Honorary Ambassador
2015	Seoul Catholic Social Welfare Society	Honorary Ambassador
2025	Seoul Catholic Foreign Mission Society	Honorary Ambassador

== Awards and nominations ==
Name of the award ceremony, year presented, category, nominee of the award, and the result of the nomination
Award ceremony	Year	Category	Nominee / Work	Result	Ref.
Baeksang Arts Awards	2022	Best Female Variety Performer	Hong Jin-kyung	Nominated	
Baeksang Arts Awards	2024	Best Female Variety Performer	Hong Jin-kyung	Won	
Baeksang Arts Awards	2025	Best Female Variety Performer	Hong Jin-kyung	Nominated	
Baeksang Arts Awards	2026	Best Female Variety Performer	Hong Jin-kyung	Nominated	
Brand of the Year Awards	2021	Female Entertainer	Hong Jin-kyung	Won	
Brand of the Year Awards	2021	Celebrity YouTuber	Hong Jin-kyung	Won	
KBS Entertainment Awards	2022	Best Teamwork	Beat Coin (with Kim Sook, Cho Sae-ho, Joo Woo-jae and Jang Wooyoung)	Won	
KBS Entertainment Awards	2022	Top Excellence in Show and Variety Category	Beat Coin	Nominated	
KBS Entertainment Awards	2023	Top Excellence in Show and Variety Category	Beat Coin	Won	
KBS Entertainment Awards	2025	Best Entertainer Award in Show and Variety Category	Problem Child in House	Won	
