= Kim Sook =

South Korean comedian (born 1975)

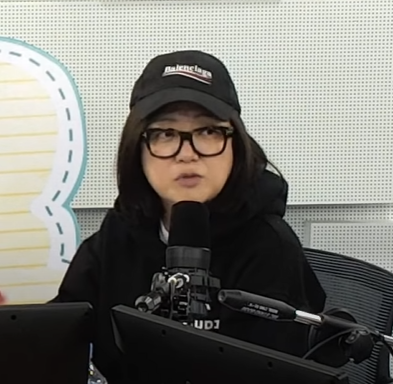
- Kim in 2019
- Born: July 6, 1975 (age 51); Busan, South Korea

Comedy career
- Years active: 1995–present
- Medium: Stand-up, television
- Genres: Observational, sketch, wit, parody, slapstick, dramatic, sitcom

Korean name
- Hangul: 김숙
- Hanja: 金淑
- RR: Gim Suk
- MR: Kim Suk

Kim Sook (Korean: 김숙; born July 6, 1975) is a South Korean comedian. The second woman to ever win the Grand Prize in Entertainment (대상), her career has spanned for almost three decades. She is currently signed with IOK Company, as her agency.

== Early life and education ==
As a teenager, Kim attended Daemyung Girls' High School. She went on to study at Youngsan University, then known as Seongshim Foreign Language University. She also attended Gukje Cyber University, where she gained a qualification in social work, although it took her 6 years to graduate from the university as she was often too busy to study for the qualification.

== Career ==
In 1995, Kim made her debut in the South Korean entertainment industry after she won silver in the National College Comedy Contest.

In 2016, Kim and fellow comedian Song Eun-i published a book together, based on their podcast, Keeping Secrets (비밀보장).

== Personal life ==
One of Kim's hobbies includes woodworking, having learnt the skill with Song Eun-i when she had little work and broadcasting activity. Not being able to find work during the shift in television entertainment in South Korea, both Song Eun-i and Kim decided to produce their own podcast Keeping Secrets, and at the same time found their own production company, Content Lab Media VIVO, with Song as the CEO and Kim as director. They later hosted their own radio show Sister's Radio on SBS Love FM (2016–2019).

Currently, she is the host of many hit TV shows: Boss In the Mirror, Problem Child In House, Same Bed- Different Dream, Where Is My Home (Show Me My Home). Kim also runs her own YouTube Channel, KimSookTV, that is produced by Content Lab Media VIVO.

== Filmography ==
=== Films ===
Year	Title	Role	Notes/Ref.
2005	Mr. Housewife (Quiz King)	Eun-jin's mother	Special appearance
2005	Tarzan Park Heung-Suk		Supporting character

=== Television series ===
Year	Title	Role	Notes/Ref.
2005	Super Rookie	Sook-hee	Supporting character
2007	Ghost Pang Pang	Grandma Sam Shin Ji-ang	Supporting character
2010	My Country Calls/Secret Agent Miss Oh	Street vendor/kiosk owner	Supporting character
2011	Manny	Goo Hyun-jung	Cast
2012	Vampire Idol	Oh Sook/Jenny	Supporting character
2016	My Horrible Boss	Apartment 802's resident	Special appearance
2016	The Sound of Your Heart	Kim Sook	Special appearance
2017	Hit the Top	Student/one of MJ's fans	Special appearance (episodes 1–2, 8, 17–18)
2020	Crash Landing on You	North Korean fortune teller	Special appearance (episodes 11&16)

=== Television shows ===
Year	Show	Role	Notes/Ref.
2002	Gag Concert	Cast member	"Bongsunga School" and "Disgrace of a Family"
2002–2003	Good Friends	Host	
2003–2007	People Looking for a Laugh	Cast member	
2009–2010	미녀들의 1박 2일	Cast member	Season 1–3
2011–2013	Infinite Girls Season 3	Cast member	
2012–2014	The Human Condition	Cast member of the comedienne specials	
2013–2015	Vitamin	Fixed panelist	Episode 507–580
2015–2017	With You	Cast member, paired with Yoon Jung-soo	Episode 24–120
2016	The Secret Readers Club	Host	Season 2
2016–2017	Sister's Slam Dunk	Cast member	Season 1 & 2
2016–2020	Battle Trip	Co-host with Lee Hwi-jae, Sung Si-kyung, San E, Kim Jun-hyun & Yoon Bo-mi (Apink)	Episode 1–177
2016–2021	Video Star	Co-host with Park So-hyun, Park Na-rae and Sandara Park	Episode 1–present
2017	Hot Cider	Host/panelist	
2017	Same Bed, Different Dreams - Season 2	Special MC	Episodes 1–2, 5–6
2017	Saturday Night Live Korea	Host with Song Eun-i	Episode 205
2017–2018	Box Life	Cast member	Pilot–3
2017–2018	Kim Saeng-min's Receipt	Co-host with Kim Saeng-min and Song Eun-i	
2017–2019	Seoul Mate	Cast member and host	Seasons 1–2
2017–present	Same Bed, Different Dreams - Season 2	Co-host with Kim Gura and Seo Jang-hoon	Episode 7–
2018	I'm a CEO 2	Host	Season 2
2018–2019	Weekend Playlist	Cast member	
2018–2019	Lanlife	Host	
2018–present	Food Bless You	Cast member	
2018–present	Problem Child in House	Cast member	
2019–present	Boss in the Mirror	Host with Jun Hyun-moo	
2019	The Night of Hate Comments	Host	
2020–present	Love Naggers 3	MC With Seo Jang-hoon, Han Hye-jin, Joo Woo-jae and Kwak Jung-un	
2021	Late Night Ghost Talk	MC With Park Na-rae and Shin Dong-yup	
2021	Book U Love	Host with Song Eun-i, Yoo Se-yoon	
2021	National Receipt	Host with Song Eun-i and Park Young-jin	
2021	Save Me! Rooms	Host	
2021	Brad PT & GYM Carry	Host	with Lee Hyun-yi and Lee Gi-kwang
2021	Off the Record	Host	with Lee Juck and Choi Yoo-jung
2021	Hogu's Secret Tutoring	Host	
2021	Superhero	Host	
2022–present	Talk Pa One 25 o'clock	Host	
2022	Baby Singer	Host	
2022	God Father	Cast Member	with Jonathan
2022–2024	Beat Coin	Cast Member	
2022	Taste of Travel	Travel manager	
2023–present	Saturday Meals Love	Cast Member	
2025–present	Screwballs	Cast Member	

=== Web series ===
Year	Title	Channel	Notes/Ref.
2016	I Am a Star	NAVER TV, VIVO TV	Main character
2016	Take Care of the Witch	JTBC^{a}	Host
2017	The King of Shopping	NAVER TV, VIVO TV	Host
2020	K-Bob Star	Nanaland/YouTube	Host (with Lee Young-ja)

^a: This was JTBC's first web series production.

=== Radio shows ===
Year	Title	Radio station	Notes/Ref.
2015–present	Song Eun-i & Kim Sook's Sister Radio (송은이, 김숙의 언니네 라디오)	SBS Love FM	Presenter

== Discography ==
=== Singles ===
==== As Nanda Kim ====
Title	Year	Album
"Lend Me ₩40,000,000" (사천만 땡겨주세요)	2005	Trot Love Songs

==== As part of Unnies ====
Title	Year	Peak chart positions		Sales	Album
Title	Year	KOR	US World	Sales	Album
"Shut Up" (feat. You Hee-yeol)	2016	3	—	KOR: 724,088+	Non-album singles
"Right?" (맞지?)	2017	2	10	KOR: 953,036+	Non-album singles
"Lalala Song" (랄랄라 송)	2017	48	22	KOR: 96,638+	Non-album song
"—" denotes releases that did not chart or were not released in that region.

==== Collaborative singles ====
Title	Year	Album
"You're The Boss" (너만 잘났냐) (with Yoon Jung-soo)	2016	SM Station Season 1
"3-Do" (3도) (with Song Eun-i, together as Double-V)	2017	Non-album singles
"That Woman Is Me" (그 여자가 나야) (with Baek Ji-young)	2022	Non-album singles
"Never" (with Hong Jin-kyung, Cho Sae-ho, Joo Woo-jae, and Jang Wooyoung, together as Unbalance)	2023	Non-album singles
"Flower Brain" (Joo Woo-jae feat. Kim Sook, Hong Jin-kyung, Cho Sae-ho, and Jang Wooyoung)	2026	Non-album singles

== Awards and nominations ==
Year	Award	Category	Nominated work	Result
2016	52nd Baeksang Arts Awards	Best Variety Performer - Female	With You	Won
2016	15th KBS Entertainment Awards	Top Excellence Award - Talk Show	Sister's Slam Dunk, Battle Trip	Won
2017	53rd Baeksang Arts Awards	Best Variety Performer - Female	Sister's Slam Dunk	Nominated
2017	2017 SBS Entertainment Awards	Radio DJ Award	Song Eun-i, Kim Sook's Sisters Radio	Won
2017	2017 SBS Entertainment Awards	Excellence Award - Show/Talk	Same Bed, Different Dreams 2	Nominated
2018	54th Baeksang Arts Awards	Best Variety Performer – Female	Video Star	Nominated
2018	9th Korean Popular Culture & Arts Awards	Prime Minister's Commendation	—N/a	Won
2018	16th KBS Entertainment Awards	Top Excellence Award - Talk Show (Female)	Battle Trip	Won
2018	2018 SBS Entertainment Awards	Best MC Award (Female)	Same Bed, Different Dreams 2	Won
2019	19th MBC Entertainment Awards	Top Excellence Award in Music/Talk Category (Female)	Where Is My Home	Won
2020	18th KBS Entertainment Awards	Grand Prize (Daesang)	Problem Child in House, Boss in the Mirror	Won
2021	57th Baeksang Arts Awards	Best Variety Performer - Female	Where Is My Home; Love Naggers	Nominated
2021	48th Korea Broadcasting Awards	Best Female Variety Star	Boss in the Mirror	Won
2021	19th KBS Entertainment Awards	Entertainer of the Year	Boss in the Mirror	Won
2022	20th KBS Entertainment Awards	Grand Prize (Daesang)	Beat Coin, Boss in the Mirror, Godfather	Nominated
2022	20th KBS Entertainment Awards	Entertainer of the Year	Beat Coin, Boss in the Mirror, Godfather	Won
2022	20th KBS Entertainment Awards	Best Couple Award (with Jonathan)	Godfather	Won
2023	21st KBS Entertainment Awards	Entertainer of the Year	Beat Coin, Boss in the Mirror	Won
2024	60th Baeksang Arts Awards	Best Female Variety Performer	Kim Sook	Nominated
2025	KBS Entertainment Awards	Entertainer of the Year	Kim Sook	Won
2025	KBS Entertainment Awards	Grand Prize (Daesang)	Kim Sook	Nominated
2026	5th Blue Dragon Series Awards	Best Female Entertainer (Top Excellence Award)	Screwballs	Won
