= Cho Sae-ho =

South Korean comedian (born 1982)

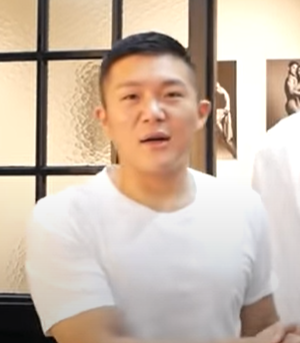
- Cho in 2020
- Born: August 9, 1982 (age 44); Seoul, South Korea
- Spouse: Unknown (m. 2024)

Comedy career
- Years active: 2001–present
- Medium: Stand-up; television
- Genres: Observational; sketch; wit; parody; slapstick; dramatic; sitcom

Korean name
- Hangul: 조세호
- Hanja: 曺世鎬
- RR: Jo Seho
- MR: Cho Seho

Cho Sae-ho (Korean: 조세호; born August 9, 1982) is a South Korean comedian. He is also known for starring in South Korean variety shows such as You Quiz on the Block, Beat Coin, and the fourth season of 2 Days & 1 Night.

== Personal life ==
On April 24, 2024, Cho announced that he will marry his girlfriend, who is nine years his junior, in October, after dating for a year. The couple married on October 20, 2024, at Hotel Shilla in Seoul.

In late 2025, he became embroiled in controversy after online allegations surfaced claiming ties to individuals associated with organized crime. His agency denied the allegations in full and announced possible legal action over false claims, while he stepped down from several television programs and temporarily suspended his activities as the controversy spread.

== Discography ==
=== Singles ===
- 2007: "Turn It Up" (1집 Turn It On!!!)
- 2013: "Guest House Project No. 1312" (게스트하우스 프로젝트 1312호) with Nam Chang-hee
- 2019: "Where are You Now" (거기 지금 어디야) with Nam Chang-hee, Prod. Rocoberry
- 2019: "Doesn't Matter Where We Live" (좋은 집이 무슨 상관이에요) with Nam Chang-hee
- 2020: "What's Wrong" (바보야 왜그래) with Nam Chang-hee
- 2021: "Winter of Dreams" (한 겨울날의 꿈) with Nam Chang-hee and U Sung-eun

==== Original soundtrack ====
Title	Year	Album
"Never" (with Kim Sook, Hong Jin-kyung, Joo Woo-jae, and Jang Wooyoung, together as Unbalance)	2023	Beat Coin OST
"Flower Brain" (Joo Woo-jae feat. Kim Sook, Hong Jin-kyung, Cho Sae-ho, and Jang Wooyoung)	2026	Screwballs OST

== Filmography ==
=== Music video appearances ===
Year	Title	Artists
2004	"Sorry My Friend" (미안하다 친구야)	Old Boy
2004	"Women with Beautiful Mind" (가슴이 예뻐야 여자다)	Chunja
2016	"Apple Pie"	Fiestar
2017	"Hot Sugar" (뜨거운 여름)	Turbo

=== Television series ===
Year	Title	Role	Note
2013	My Love from the Star	Cheol-soo	

=== Television shows ===
Year	Title	Role	Note
2014–2015	Roommate	Cast member	Season 1–2
2014–2020	Happy Together (S 3, 4)	Host	Episode 358–557
2015	Shin Dong-yeop and Bachelor Party	Himself	
2016	We Got Married	Cast member	Paired with Fiestar's Cao Lu (Episodes 311–314, 316–340)
2016	Battle Trip	Contestant	with Lee Hwi-jae and Nam Chang-hee (Episodes 17–18)
2016–2017	Flower Crew	Cast member	
2017	Law of the Jungle in Sumatra	Cast member	Episodes 256–261
2017	Living Together in Empty Room	Cast member	with Yoni P, Steve J and Block B's P. O (Episodes 4–8) with Sandara Park & Block B's P. O (Episodes 12–18, 20)
2017	Battle Trip	Contestant	with Nam Chang-hee (Episodes 68–69)
2018	Infinite Challenge	Cast member	Episodes 552–563
2018	Where on Earth??	Cast Member	Episode 1 – 12
2018–2019	Chart & Go	Host	Episode 1 – 15
2018—2025	You Quiz on the Block	Cast Member	Episode 1 – 324
2019	Weekly Idol	Host	Episode 388 – 446
2019	Don Quixote	Cast Member	Episode 1 – 8
2019–2020	Sister's Salon	Cast Member	Episode 1 – 16
2020	On & Off S1	Cast Member	Episode 1 – 31
2021	It's Party Time	Cast Member	Episode 1 – 2
2021	Painting Thieves	Cast Member	
2021	Quiz from the Stars	Host	with Nam Chang-hee, Kim Hwan and Cho Mi-yeon
2021	Legend Music Class - Lalaland	Cast	
2021	Rice come at the end of hardship	Main Cast	
2021	Bistro Shigor	service staff	
2021–2022	Golvengers	Cast Member	with Ji Jin-hee, Gu Bon-gil and Son Sae-eun
2022	Army Three	Host	with Ahn Sol-bin and Kwak Yoon-gy
2022	Suspicious Bookstore East West South Book	Host	
2022–2024	Beat Coin	Cast Member	
2023	My Friends Are Smarter Than Me	Host	
2024	When I Opened My Eyes OOO	Cast Member	
2024	Extreme Tour	Cast Member	
2024–2025	2 Days & 1 Night Season 4	Cast Member	Episode 237 – 307
2025	Good Day	Cast Member	
2025–present	Screwballs	Cast Member	

=== Web shows ===
Year	Title	Role	Notes	Ref.
2021	Drop the Petty	Host		
2021	Cho Sae-ho's Wine Bar	Host		
2022	Mouth on Wheels	Cast Member	Season 2	
2022	Some-ping	Host		
2023	Bromarble	Cast Member	with Yoo Yeon-seok, Lee Seung-gi, Ji Seok-jin, Kyuhyun, Joshua and Hoshi	

== Accolades ==
=== Awards and nominations ===
Year presented, name of the award ceremony, award category, nominated work and the result of the nomination
Year	Award	Category	Nominated work	Result	Ref.
2014	SBS Entertainment Awards	New Star Award		Won	
2016	SBS Entertainment Awards	Best Friend Award	Flower Crew	Won	
2016	SBS Entertainment Awards	Variety Show Scene Stealer Award	Flower Crew	Won	
2016	MBC Entertainment Awards	Popularity Award	We Got Married Season 4	Won	
2018	KBS Entertainment Awards	Excellence Award (Talk/Show)	Happy Together Season 4	Won	
2019	MBC Entertainment Awards	Excellence Award (Music/Talk)	Hangout with Yoo, Sister's Salon	Won	
2021	57th Baeksang Arts Awards	Best Male Variety Performer	Cho Sae-ho	Nominated	
2022	58th Baeksang Arts Awards	Best Male Variety Performer	Cho Sae-ho	Nominated	
2022	2022 KBS Entertainment Awards	Excellence Award in Show and Variety Category	Beat Coin	Nominated	
2022	2022 KBS Entertainment Awards	Best Couple Award (with Joo Woo-jae)	Beat Coin	Won	
2024	3rd Blue Dragon Series Awards	Best Male Entertainer	Super Rich in Korea	Nominated	

=== State honors ===
Name of the organization, year presented, and the award given
Organization	Year	Award	Ref.
Taxpayers' Day	2021	Presidential Commendation	
