= Korea Sings =

- Also known as: National Singing Contest
- Genre: Music
- Starring: Song Hae (until May 2022); Kim Shin-young (from October 2022)
- Country of origin: South Korea
- Original language: Korean
- No. of episodes: 2,138

Production
- Production location: South Korea
- Running time: 70 minutes

Original release
- Network: KBS 1TV
- Release: November 9, 1980 – present

Korea Sings (Korean: 전국노래자랑; RR: Jeongungnoraejarang; lit. National Singing Pride), commonly known in English as National Singing Contest, is a South Korean musical TV program. It airs live on KBS 1TV on Sunday at 12:10 beginning November 9, 1980. For South Korean holidays, the show has been hosted overseas. In 2003, the show was hosted in Pyongyang during National Liberation Day of Korea.

== History ==
The show originally started as a program called KBS National Singing Fight (Korean: KBS배 쟁탈 전국노래자랑) from 1972 to 1977.

== Description ==
According to the official program page, the show is described as "a show of battles of wit and exciting songs between amateur guests who passed the preliminary in their local regions which aims to make people touched, have good memories, and give honest smiles to the audience with things to be proud of the region that are unique to the area."
