= Beat Coin =

South Korean television show

- Promotional poster
- Also known as: HK Coin
- Hangul: 홍김동전
- RR: Hong Gim dongjeon
- MR: Hong Kim tongjŏn
- Genre: Variety show
- Directed by: Yoon Hyun-joon
- Starring: Kim Sook; Hong Jin-kyung; Cho Sae-ho; Joo Woo-jae; Jang Wooyoung
- Country of origin: South Korea
- Original language: Korean
- No. of episodes: 70

Production
- Producer: Park In-seok
- Production location: South Korea
- Running time: 80 minutes

Original release
- Network: KBS2
- Release: July 21, 2022 – January 18, 2024

Beat Coin (Korean: 홍김동전; RR: Hong Gim dongjeon) was a South Korean television program that aired on KBS2 on Thursdays at 20:30 (KST) from July 21, 2022 to January 18, 2024. Helmed by Park In-seok, the producer of Sister's Slam Dunk and the third installment of 2 Days & 1 Night, and the writer of Battle Trip, the show began with the premise of leaving fate to the flip of a coin and was inspired by the format of older Korean variety shows from the 2000s and early 2010s; however, the coin flip concept was gradually phased out of the show. Each episode had a new theme, with one notable long-term project being the release of a music single. Despite amassing a fan club which called themselves "Coin Purse" or "Piggy Bank", the show was ultimately cancelled after 70 episodes due to low ratings.

On February 23, 2025, Screwballs (Korean: 도라이버; RR: Doraibeo), an ongoing successor starring the same cast and helmed by the same producer, began airing on Netflix. The show received attention for quickly topping Netflix's top 10 list in South Korea, in contrast to its predecessor's performance on cable television, and it has since repeatedly reappeared on the list with the release of each new season.

== Cast ==
- Kim Sook, comedian
- Hong Jin-kyung, model
- Cho Sae-ho, comedian
- Joo Woo-jae, model
- Jang Wooyoung, singer and member of 2PM

== List of episodes ==
Year	Episodes		Originally aired		Time slot (KST)
Year	Episodes		First aired	Last aired	Time slot (KST)
2022	20	7	July 21, 2022	September 15, 2022	Thursday; 20:30–21:50
2022	20	13	September 18, 2022	December 25, 2022	Sunday; 21:20–22:40
2023	47	3	January 1, 2023	January 15, 2023	Sunday; 21:20–22:40
2023	47	15	February 16, 2023	May 25, 2023	Thursday; 20:30–21:50
2023	47	29	June 1, 2023	December 28, 2023	Thursday; 20:30–21:45
2024	3		January 4, 2024	January 18, 2024	Thursday; 20:30–21:45

List of episodes in 2022 (episode 1–20)

Ep. #	Air Date	Guest(s)	Theme	Ref.
Pilot	July 14, 2022	—N/a	—N/a	
1	July 21, 2022	—N/a	Bungee Jumping or Not	
2	July 28, 2022	—N/a	Six-Star Hotel Check-In or Check-Out	
3	August 4, 2022	Kang Jae-jun, Meenoi	Six-Star Hotel Check-In or Check-Out	
4	August 11, 2022	Sandara Park, Irene Kim, Lee Gi-kwang, Gyeongree, MC Gree	Summer Vacation Best Friend Special	
5	August 25, 2022	Cha Tae-hyun, Twice (Jeongyeon, Jihyo); Special guests: Kim Deok-jae (vice president of KBS), Ateez (Yunho, Mingi, Wooyoung), Byun Sung-gil (former floor director of Gag Concert), Kim Jong-min (Koyote)	Fate Directors	
6	September 1, 2022	Cha Tae-hyun, Twice (Jeongyeon, Jihyo); Special guests: Le Sserafim	Your Glorious Youth	
No broadcast on September 8 due to the aftermath of Typhoon Hinnamnor.
7	September 15, 2022	—N/a	Telepathy	
8	September 18, 2022	Special guests: La Poem	"Coin Kingdom"	
9	September 25, 2022	Xiumin (Exo), Baekho, Jung Hyuk	"Coin! Earth Expedition!" (2022 FIFA World Cup Special) Part 1	
10	October 2, 2022	Xiumin (Exo), Baekho, Jung Hyuk; Special guest: Lee Chun-soo, Oh Ha-young (Apink)	"Coin! Earth Expedition!" (2022 FIFA World Cup Special) Part 2	
11	October 9, 2022	Xiumin (Exo), Baekho, Jung Hyuk	"Coin! Earth Expedition!" (2022 FIFA World Cup Special) Part 3; Yonsei University Festival	
12	October 16, 2022	—N/a	Yonsei University Festival Guerilla Concert	
13	October 23, 2022	Special guests: Shin Gyu-jin, Lee Su-ji, Kang Jae-jun, (G)I-dle (Miyeon, Minnie), Park Jun-gyu, Seulgi (Red Velvet), Stray Kids (Lee Know, Han, Hyunjin, Seungmin, I.N), Xiumin	Halloween Murder Mystery	
No broadcast on October 30 due to the aftermath of the Seoul Halloween crowd crush.
14	November 6, 2022	Special guests: Nature (Sohee, Saebom, Aurora, Chaebin, Uchae)	"War on Viewer Ratings"	
15	November 13, 2022	—N/a	"The Spoon Game" Part 1	
16	November 20, 2022	—N/a	"The Spoon Game" Part 2; "Three Meals Coin Homestay" Part 1	
17	November 27, 2022	—N/a	"Three Meals Coin Homestay" Part 2	
18	December 11, 2022	Park Jin-young	Beolgyo Girls' High School Surprise Concert	
19	December 18, 2022	Park Jin-young	Yeosu Surprise Concert	
20	December 25, 2022	—N/a	Beating Cheongyang's Bosses	

List of episodes in 2023 (episode 21–67)

Ep. #	Air Date	Guest(s)	Theme	Ref.
21	January 1	—N/a	Sook's Camping or Tentless Camping	
22	January 8	—N/a	Blood Circulation or Economy Circulation (Sauna or Labor)	
23	January 15	—N/a	"Beat Coin Entertainment Company Retreat"	
24	February 16	—N/a	Medical Check-Up	
25	February 23	Special guest: Lee Su-ji, Bbaek Ga (Koyote)	"Superstar Versus Manager"	
26	March 2	—N/a	"Superstar Versus Manager"	
27	March 9	—N/a	2 Days & 1 Night Special Part 1	
28	March 16	—N/a	2 Days & 1 Night Special Part 2	
29	March 23	Special guests: Heo Kyung-hwan, Kim Soo-yong, Nam Chang-hee, Nichkhun (2PM)	2 Days & 1 Night Special Part 3; "Shameful Historical Journal, That Day"	
30	March 30	Jimin (BTS)	Dangerous Invitation Special	
31	April 6	Special guests: Park Ji-yoon, MC Gree	"Coin Golden Bell" (Star Golden Bell Special)	
32	April 13	Special guests: Park Ji-yoon, MC Gree	"Coin Golden Bell" (Star Golden Bell Special)	
33	April 20	—N/a	Blind Date Part 1 (Woo-jae, Se-ho)	
34	April 27	—N/a	Blind Date Part 2 (Sook)	
35	May 4	—N/a	Recreating Fairy Tales (Children's Day Special)	
36	May 11	Rado, Kim Hye-sun, Baek Gu-young	"That Girl Life" or a Hard Life	
37	May 18	Taeyang (BigBang)	"Beat Coin Entertainment Company Outing"	
38	May 25	Special guests: Kwak Beom	Ewha Woman's University Festival	
39	June 1	Stray Kids (Bang Chan, Changbin, Felix, Seungmin, I.N)	Music Stars versus Variety Stars	
40	June 8	—N/a	"The Spoon Game Returns"	
41	June 15	—N/a	"The Spoon Game Returns"	
42	June 22	Taecyeon (2PM)	Ghosts versus Secret Human	
43	June 29	Rado	Formation of Unbalance (group)	
44	July 6	Special guests: Kim Hye-sun, Kim Myung-seon	Sook's Birthday Special	
45	July 13	—N/a	Mental Health Check-Up	
46	July 20	—N/a	First Anniversary Special	
47	July 27	—N/a	"Beat Coin Scout" (25th World Scout Jamboree and Horror Special)	
48	August 10	Rado	Unbalance's "Never" part distribution	
49	August 17	Lee Sang-yeob, Kim Jin-woo (Winner), Jihyo (Twice)	Sports Stars versus Secret Spy	
50	August 24	Rado; Special guests: Lachica, Kinky, Root, Park Jin-young, STAYC (Sieun, Seeun, Yoon)	Unbalance's "Never" recording and choreography	
51	August 31	2PM	2PM 15th Anniversary Special	
52	September 7	2PM	2PM 15th Anniversary Special	
53	September 14	—N/a	Hong Kong Special	
54	September 21	—N/a	Hong Kong Special	
55	October 5	—N/a	"Coin Travel in Paju"	
56	October 12	Rado	Unbalance's "Never" MV filming	
57	October 19	Rado, Lachica	Unbalance's "Never" MV filming and live performance; "Coin Travel in Gwangju" Part 1	
58	October 26	Rado (Note: Standing in for Wooyoung.)	"Coin Travel in Gwangju" Part 2	
59	November 2	Kim Myung Seon, Shim Eu Ddeum, Kim Hye-sun, Kim Chun Ri, Jang Eun-sil	Autumn Field Day	
60	November 9	Sam Hammington	"CSAT Preparation Drill"	
61	November 16	—N/a	Detectives versus Secret Thief	
62	November 23	—N/a	Bungee Jumping or Not 2	
63	November 30	Cameo: Yoo Jae-suk, Shin Dong-yup, Uhm Jung-hwa, Kim Tae-ho, Lee Jun-ho (2PM)	"Jin-kyung's Strange Day" (Jin-kyung's 30th Debut Anniversary Special)	
64	December 7	—N/a	Jin-kyung's 30th Debut Anniversary Dinner Show	
65	December 14	Special guest: Lee Yoon-jung	"The Little Genius" (The Genius Special) Part 1	
66	December 21	—N/a	"The Little Genius" (The Genius Special) Part 2; Sook's Camping or Awkward Camping (Christmas Special)	
67	December 28	—N/a	Secret Agents Race	

List of episodes in 2024 (episode 68-70)

Ep. #	Air Date	Guest(s)	Theme	Ref.
68	January 4	Special guests: Yunho (Ateez)	"Beat Coin Ad's Kick-Off Meeting"	
69	January 11	—N/a	Year of the Blue Dragon Special	
70	January 18	—N/a	Final Episode (Early Chuseok Special)	

== Ratings ==
In the ratings below, the highest rating for the show will be in red, and the lowest rating for the show will be in blue each year.

List of ratings in 2022 (episode 1–20)

Ep. #	Original Airdate	AGB Nielsen
Ep. #	Original Airdate	Nationwide
1	July 21	1.7%
2	July 28	1.7%
3	August 4	1.5%
4	August 11	1.2%
5	August 25	2.0%
6	September 1	1.6%
7	September 15	1.5%
8	September 18	1.7%
9	September 25	1.6%
10	October 2	2.1%
11	October 9	1.3%
12	October 16	2.4%
13	October 23	1.1%
14	November 6	1.5%
15	November 13	1.1%
16	November 20	1.5%
17	November 27	3.0%
18	December 11	2.7%
19	December 18	2.3%
20	December 25	1.5%

List of ratings in 2023 (Episode 21–67)

Ep. #	Original Airdate	AGB Nielsen
Ep. #	Original Airdate	Nationwide
21	January 1	2.0%
22	January 8	1.8%
23	January 15	1.6%
24	February 16	2.4%
25	February 23	1.3%
26	March 2	1.6%
27	March 9	2.2%
28	March 16	1.8%
29	March 23	1.4%
30	March 30	2.1%
31	April 6	1.9%
32	April 13	1.3%
33	April 20	1.8%
34	April 27	1.9%
35	May 4	1.9%
36	May 11	1.4%
37	May 18	1.1%
38	May 25	1.9%
39	June 1	1.3%
40	June 8	1.4%
41	June 15	1.4%
42	June 22	1.4%
43	June 29	1.4%
44	July 6	1.7%
45	July 13	1.6%
46	July 20	1.4%
47	July 27	1.9%
48	August 10	1.2%
49	August 17	1.3%
50	August 24	1.2%
51	August 31	1.4%
52	September 7	1.6%
53	September 14	1.7%
54	September 21	1.5%
55	October 5	1.1%
56	October 12	0.8%
57	October 19	1.3%
58	October 26	1.5%
59	November 2	2.1%
60	November 9	1.4%
61	November 16	1.2%
62	November 23	1.5%
63	November 30	2.1%
64	December 7	1.6%
65	December 14	1.2%
66	December 21	1.7%
67	December 28	1.6%

List of ratings in 2024 (Episode 68–70)

Ep. #	Original Airdate	AGB Nielsen
Ep. #	Original Airdate	Nationwide
68	January 4	1.2%
69	January 11	1.1%
70	January 18	1.6%

== Discography ==
Title	Album details	Peak chart positions	Album
Title	Album details	KOR Down.	Album
"Never" (as Unbalance)	Released: October 19, 2023; Label: KBS Media; Format: Digital download	101	Non-album single

== Awards and nominations ==
Name of the award ceremony, year presented, category, nominee of the award, and the result of the nomination
Award ceremony	Year	Category	Nominee / Work	Result	Ref.
KBS Entertainment Awards	2022	Best Couple Award	Joo Woo-jae and Cho Sae-ho	Won	
KBS Entertainment Awards	2022	Best Teamwork	Beat Coin	Won	
KBS Entertainment Awards	2022	Entertainer of the Year	Kim Sook	Won	
KBS Entertainment Awards	2022	Excellence Award in Show and Variety Category	Cho Sae-ho	Nominated	
KBS Entertainment Awards	2022	Rookie Award in Show and Variety Category	Jang Wooyoung	Nominated	
KBS Entertainment Awards	2022	Rookie Award in Show and Variety Category	Joo Woo-jae	Nominated	
KBS Entertainment Awards	2022	Top Excellence Award in Show and Variety Category	Hong Jin-kyung	Nominated	
KBS Entertainment Awards	2023	Entertainer of the Year	Kim Sook	Won	
KBS Entertainment Awards	2023	Excellence Award in Show and Variety Category	Joo Woo-jae	Won	
KBS Entertainment Awards	2023	Top Excellence Award in Show and Variety Category	Hong Jin-kyung	Won	
