= Irene Kim =

American model (born 1987)

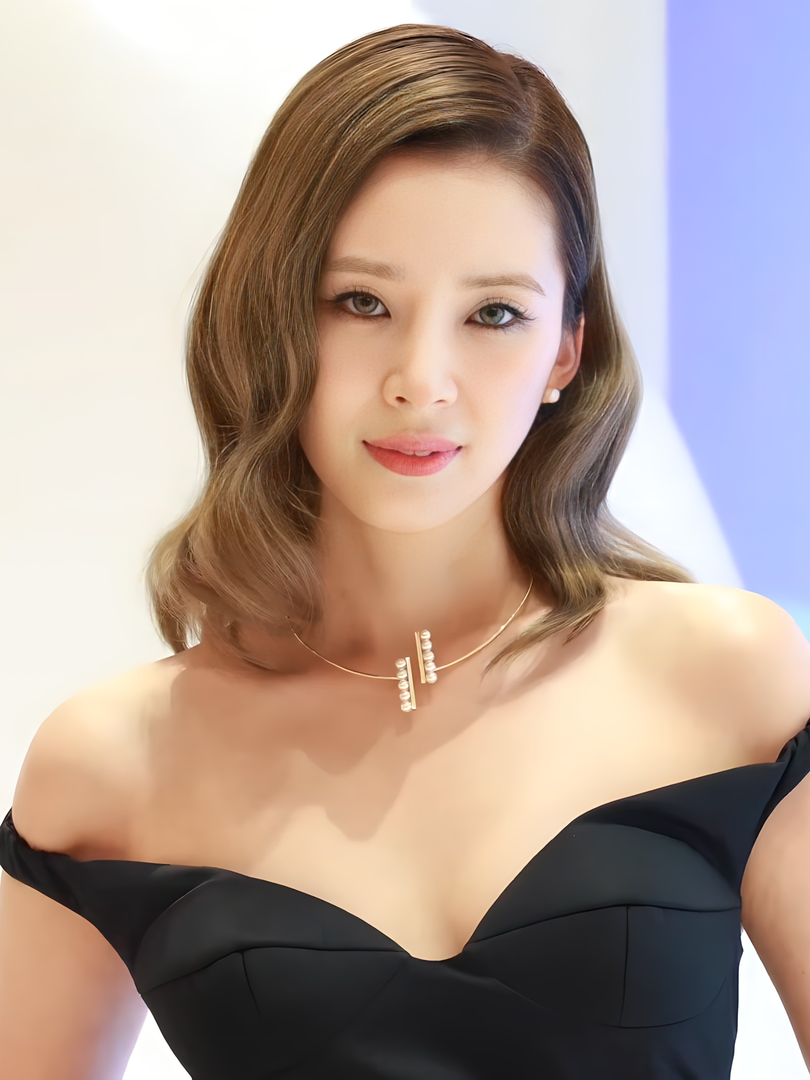
- Kim in 2024
- Born: November 6, 1987 (age 38); Iowa, U.S.
- Occupations: Model; influencer; TV personality
- Agents: Society Model Management (U.S.); Saram Entertainment (South Korea)
- Height: 5 ft 10 in (1.78 m)
- Spouse: Unknown (m. 2025)

Irene Kim (November 6, 1987), also known by her online alias Ireneisgood, is an American model, beauty and fashion journalist, and television personality based in New York City. In 2018, Kim released her clothing brand IRENEISGOOD LABEL.

== Early life ==
Irene Kim was born in Iowa, to South Korean parents and raised in Seattle, Washington. In middle school, Kim and her family moved to South Korea, where she attended a Christian boarding school. Kim studied textile design at New York's Fashion Institute of Technology. While interning at JYP Entertainment, Kim came up with the leopard print concept for the Wonder Girls' single, "So Hot".

Kim credits her sense of style to her grandmother.

== Career ==
=== Modeling ===
Kim's first runway show was for Jardin de Chouette and SJYP in 2012. Kim walked for J Koo, KYE, Youser, Supercomma B, and S=YZ. She has worked with designers such as Mulberry, Ferragamo, MATCHESFASHION, MaxMara, Calvin Klein, Charles & Keith, and Chanel.

In 2015, Kim was appointed as Estée Lauder's Global Beauty Contributor with Kendall Jenner. Kim is a brand ambassador for Chanel.

She appeared on magazine covers for Cosmopolitan Korea, Marie Claire Taiwan, W Korea, Harper's Bazaar Korea, Elle Thailand, and Grazia Magazine China.

Kim is known for her multi-colored hair.

=== Ambassadorship ===
In September 2024, Kim was appointed to be Concept Korea's 2025 S/S ambassador and model, showcasing the collections of three domestic fashion designers during Paris Fashion Week.

=== Television ===
In 2015, Kim became a co-host for Mnet's original programming, "K-Style", a show introducing Korean trends in fashion, beauty, and lifestyle. A few years later, she became co-host of CJ E&M's channel Onstyle on a program called, "Style Live". Her segment was titled, "Irene Live". In 2019, Irene became one of the hosts for CJ E&M's "Get It Beauty" program, a show that shares beauty tips and trends.

In 2019, Kim met with E News' E Social Studies Club to discuss the meaning of Ireneisgood.

With Eva Chen, the head of fashion partnerships at Instagram, Kim was one of the influencers who appeared on The Today Show to introduce spring trends of the 2019 season.

In May 2024, Irene signed with new agency Saram Entertainment.

=== Label ===
In June 2018, Irene released her brand, IRENEISGOOD LABEL. The Label had pop-ups in Shanghai, China and Seoul, South Korea. In March 2019, IRENEISGOOD Label released its first sneaker collaboration and pop-up with JOSHUAS in Taiwan.

== Personal life ==
On May 23, 2025, Kim married a non-celebrity businessman after dating for about two years.

== Filmography ==
Year	Music Video	Role
2015	Amber Liu "Shake That Brass"	Band Ensemble
2018	Amber Liu "Get Over It"	Band Ensemble

Year	TV Show	Role	Note
2019	Hangout with Yoo	Self	Episodes 3 and 4
2020	Somebody Feed Phil	Self	Season 3 episode 4, "Seoul"
2021–2022	Shooting Stars	Self	Member of FC Giants

== Awards ==
In 2017, Kim won the "Style Influencer" award at the Elle Style Awards.

== See also ==
- Koreans in New York City
- New Yorkers in journalism
