= List of awards and nominations received by Kim Hee-chul =

Heechul awards and nominations
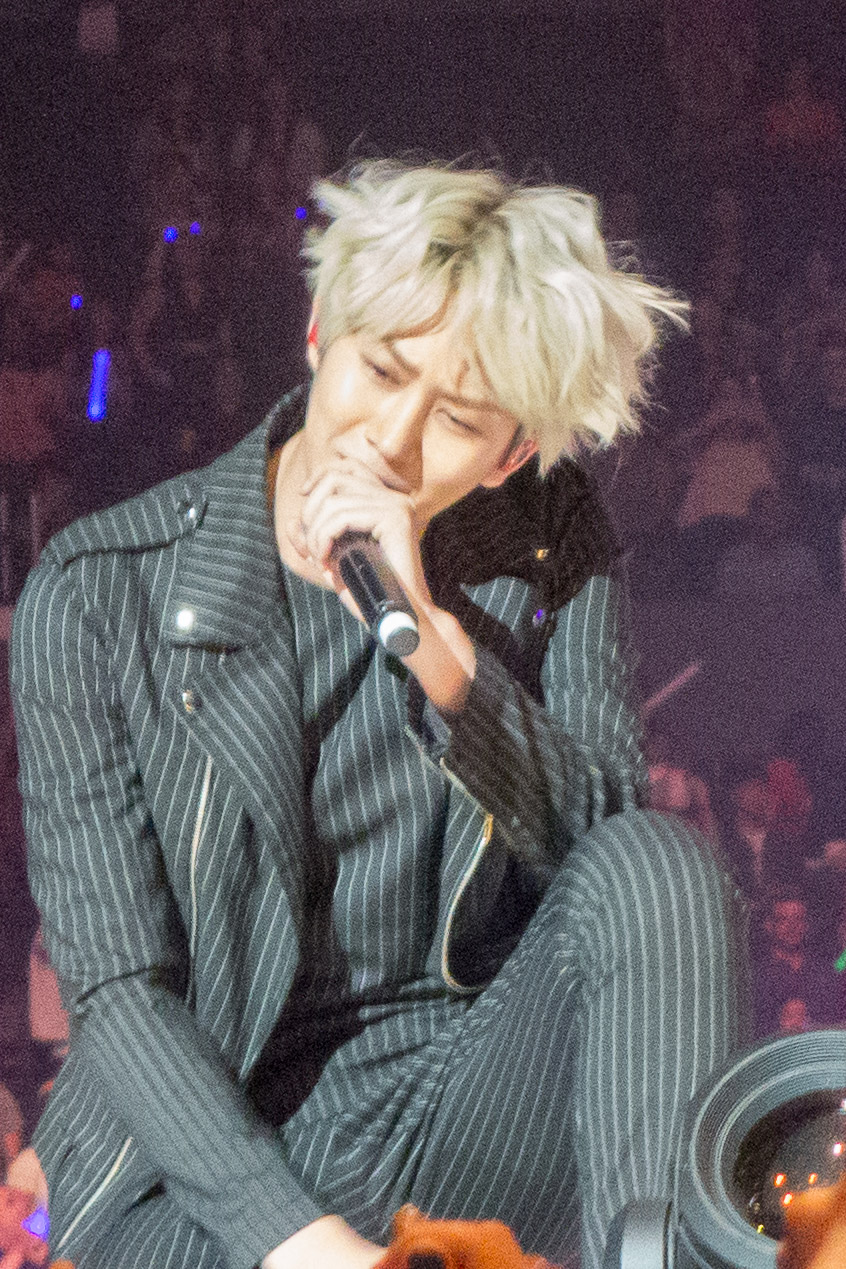
- Kim in 2015
Awards and nominations
Award	Wins	Nominations
Baeksang Arts Awards	0	2
Brand Customer Loyalty Awards	1	2
Cosmo Beauty Awards	1	1
Cosmo Glam Night Awards	1	1
Gaon Chart Music Awards	0	2
JTBC Awards	2	2
MBC Entertainment Awards	1	1
Melon Music Awards	2	2
Mnet 20's Choice Awards	1	1
SBS Entertainment Awards	4	4
Shorty Awards	0	1

Totals (Note: Certain award groups do not simply award one winner. They acknowledge several different recipients, have runners-up, and have third place. Since this is a specific recognition and is different from losing an award, runner-up mentions are considered wins in this award tally. For simplification and to avoid errors, each award in this list has been presumed to have had a prior nomination.)
- Wins: 13
- Nominations: 18

Kim Hee-chul (Korean: 김희철; born July 10, 1983), better known mononymously as Heechul, is a South Korean singer-songwriter, rapper, presenter and actor.

== Awards and nominations ==
Name of the award ceremony, year presented, category, nominee(s) of the award, and the result of the nomination
Award ceremony	Year	Category	Nominee(s)/work(s)	Result	Ref.
Baeksang Arts Awards	2020	Best Variety Performer – Male	Knowing Bros	Nominated	
Baeksang Arts Awards	2020	TikTok Popularity Award – Male	Kim Hee-chul	Nominated	
Brand Customer Loyalty Awards	2020	Most Influential Male Variety Idol	Kim Hee-chul	Won	
Brand Customer Loyalty Awards	2021	Best Male Variety Idol	Kim Hee-chul	Nominated	
Cosmo Beauty Awards	2015	Asia Beauty Icon Award	Kim Hee-chul	Won	
Cosmo Glam Night Awards	2019	Person of the Year Award	Kim Hee-chul	Won	
Gaon Chart Music Awards	2017	Song of the Year – November (shared with Min Kyung-hoon)	"Sweet Dream"	Nominated	
Gaon Chart Music Awards	2019	Song of the Year – February (shared with Min Kyung-hoon)	"Falling Blossoms"	Nominated	
JTBC Awards (Note: Determined through viewers votes)	2016	Best Entertainer	Knowing Bros	Won	
JTBC Awards	2016	Best Couple Award (shared with Min Kyung-hoon)	Knowing Bros	Won	
MBC Entertainment Awards	2011	Best Newcomer Award	Radio Star	Won	
Melon Music Awards	2017	Best Rock Song (shared with Min Kyung-hoon)	"Sweet Dream"	Won	
Melon Music Awards	2018	Best Rock Song (shared with Min Kyung-hoon)	"Falling Blossoms"	Won	
Mnet 20's Choice Awards	2007	Best Pretty Boy	Kim Hee-chul	Won	
SBS Entertainment Awards	2019	Excellence Award – Reality	My Little Old Boy, Delicious Rendezvous	Won	
SBS Entertainment Awards	2020	Top Excellence Award – Reality	Delicious Rendezvous	Won	
SBS Entertainment Awards	2021	Grand Prize (Daesang) (shared with My Little Old Boy team (Note: Consisting of Shin Dong-yup, Seo Jang-hoon, Cho Hye-seon, Kim Sun-ja, Park Young-hye, Lee Sang-min, Tak Jae-hoon, Im Won-hee, Kim Joon-ho, Kim Jong-kook, Lee Tae-sung, Oh Min-suk, Park Goon, Choi Jin-hyuk))	My Little Old Boy	Won	
SBS Entertainment Awards	2024	Good Partner Award (shared with My Little Old Boy team (Note: Consisting of Kim Jong-kook, Heo Kyung-hwan, Lee Dong-gun))	My Little Old Boy	Won	
Shorty Awards	2011	Best Celebrity	Kim Hee-chul	Nominated	

== Other accolades ==
=== State and cultural honors ===
Name of organization, year given, and name of honor
Organization	Year	Honor	Ref.
Seongdong District Office	2013	Excellent Service Award	
National Tax Service of South Korea (Note: Honors are given at the Taxpayers' Day ceremony.)	2019	Exemplary Taxpayer Commendation	

=== Listicles ===
Name of publisher, year listed, name of listicle, and placement
Publisher	Year	Listicle	Placement	Ref.
Forbes	2020	Korea Power Celebrity 40	10th	

== See also ==
- List of awards and nominations received by Super Junior
