= Universe Cowards =

South Korean duo

- Also known as: Space Cowards, Universe Hipchengi, Universe Hipsters
- Origin: Seoul, South Korea
- Genres: K-pop; Sentimental ballad; hip hop
- Years active: 2016–present
- Labels: SM; Label SJ; Santa Music
- Members: Min Kyung-hoon; Kim Hee-chul

Universe Cowards (Korean: 우주겁쟁이; RR: Ujugeopjaengi), also known briefly by "Universe Hipsters" (우주힙쟁이; Ujuhipjaengi), is a musical duo consisting of Super Junior's Heechul and Buzz's Min Kyung-hoon. The duo debuted on the hit show, Knowing Bros as a project duo and released their first ever single, "Sweet Dream". The duo name is a mix of Hee-chul's nickname, "Universe Big Star" and Buzz's song, "Coward".

== Discography ==
Title	Year	Peak chart positions		Sales	Album
Title	Year	KOR		Sales	Album
Title	Year	Gaon	Hot	Sales	Album
"Sweet Dream"	2016	1	*	KOR: 938,837	SM Station Season 1
"Falling Blossoms"	2018	15	14	—N/a	Non-album single
"Hanryang" (feat. BIBI, Prod. DinDin)	2020	190	72	—N/a	Non-album single
"—" denotes releases that did not chart or were not released in that region. "*" denotes the chart did not exist at that time.

== Filmography ==
=== Television ===
Year	Title	Role	Network
2016–present	Knowing Bros	Cast member	JTBC

== Accolades ==
Year	Award	Category	Nominated work	Result	Ref
2017	6th Gaon Chart Music Awards	Song of the Year (November)	"Sweet Dream"	Nominated	
2017	9th Melon Music Awards	Best Rock Song	"Sweet Dream"	Won	
2018	10th Melon Music Awards	Best Rock Song	"Falling Blossoms"	Won	
2019	8th Gaon Chart Music Awards	Song of the Year (February)	"Falling Blossoms"	Nominated	
