= Why Did You Come to my House =

2019 South Korean TV series

- Promotional poster
- Genre: Reality television, Variety show
- Starring: Kim Hee-chul; Austin Kang; Han Hye-jin; Kim Shin-young
- Country of origin: South Korea
- Original language: Korean
- No. of episodes: 16

Production
- Running time: 70 minute

Original release
- Network: skyDrama, Channel A
- Release: May 19 – September 1, 2019

Why Did You Come To My House? (Korean: 우리집에 왜왔니) is a South Korean show distributed by skyDrama and Channel A airs on Sunday at 19:70 KST.

== Format ==
The show follows the cast members as they visit the houses of different guests, doing activities and throwing parties at each different house.

== Cast ==
Name	Episode(s)
Kim Hee-chul	1-16
Austin Kang	1-16
Han Hye-jin	1-5, 8-13
Kim Shin-young	1-6
Kim Jun-hyun	14-16
Yoon Bo-ra	14-16

== List of episodes ==
Episode	Air date	House owner	Special guest	Note
1	May 19, 2019	Haemin		
2	May 26, 2019	Jang Dong-min		
3	June 2, 2019	Song Kyung-a		
4	June 9, 2019	Don Spike	DinDin	
5	June 16, 2019	Song Jae-hee, Ji So-yeon		
6	June 23, 2019	Paris Hilton		Special MC: DinDin, Hwang Bo-ra / Han Hye-jin and Austin Kang are Absent
7	June 30, 2019	Chan Ho Park	Oh Ji-ho	Special MC: DinDin, Hwang Bo-ra / Han Hye-jin and Austin Kang are Absent
8	July 7, 2019	Solbi		Special MC: DinDin
9	July 14, 2019	Kim Young-ok		
10	July 21, 2019	Lee Won-il		Special MC: Kim Hoyoung
11	July 28, 2019	CIX		Special MC: DinDin
12	August 4, 2019	Kim Hee-chul	Min Kyung-hoon (Buzz)	Special MC: DinDin
13	August 11, 2019	Cheetah		Special MC: Defconn
14	August 18, 2019	Kim Min-jun		
15	August 25, 2019	Jeong Mi-ae		
16	September 1, 2019	Han Suk-joon		
