= Kim Hee-chul =

South Korean musician

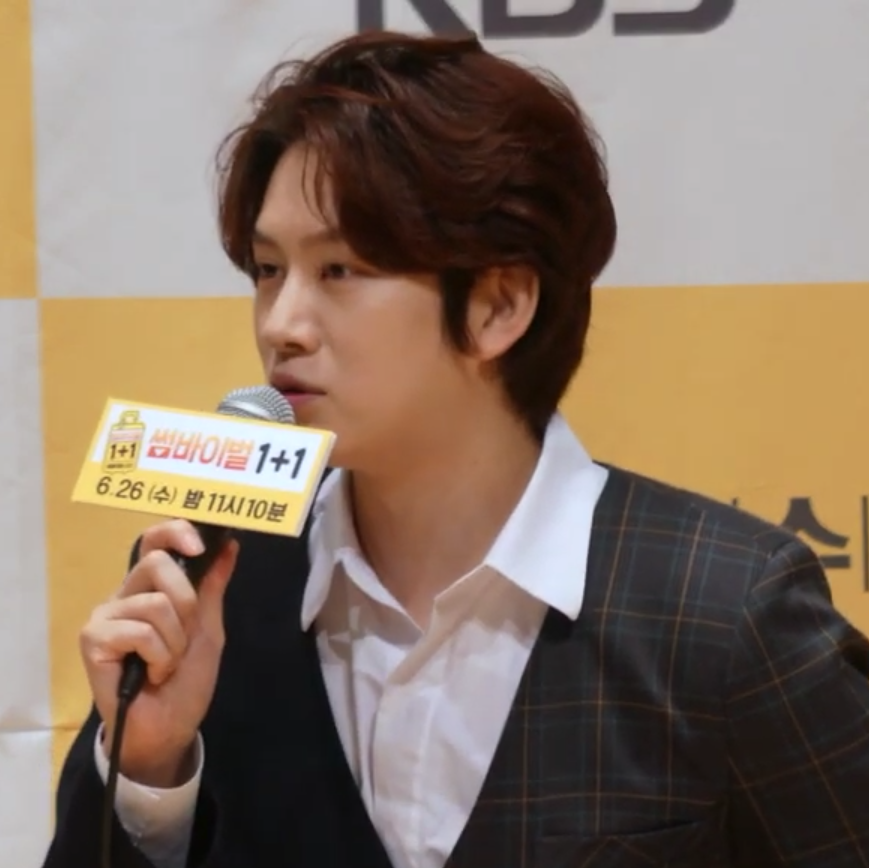
- Heechul in June 2019
- Born: July 10, 1983 (age 43); Hoengseong County, Gangwon Province, South Korea
- Education: Sangji University
- Occupations: Singer; songwriter; rapper; presenter; model; actor; radio host; director
- Musical career
- Genres: K-pop; Rock; R&B; Trot
- Instruments: Vocals; drums
- Years active: 2005–present
- Labels: SM; Label SJ
- Member of: Super Junior; Super Junior-T; Universe Cowards; SM Town; Super Junior-83z
- Formerly of: Kim Heechul & Kim Jungmo
- Website: Official website

Korean name
- Hangul: 김희철
- Hanja: 金希澈
- RR: Gim Huicheol
- MR: Kim Hŭich'ŏl

Signature
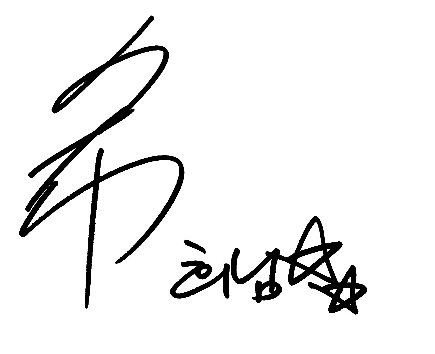

Kim Hee-chul (Korean: 김희철; born July 10, 1983), better known mononymously as Heechul, is a South Korean singer-songwriter, rapper, presenter, and actor. He is a member of the South Korean boy band Super Junior and has further participated in its subgroups Super Junior-T and is the leader of subgroup Super Junior-83z, as well as a member of project groups Universe Cowards with Min Kyung-hoon and Woojoo jjokkomi with Lee Soo-geun. He was also a member of the disbanded pop rock duo Kim Heechul & Kim Jungmo.

Prior to his debut in Super Junior, Heechul began his acting career in 2005, starring in the second season of teen drama Sharp 2. This led him to host radio shows, his first music show Show! Music Tank and appear on advertisements. However, in 2006, just a year after his Super Junior debut, Heechul was involved in a car accident which fractured his left leg. The accident left him unable to perform Super Junior's strenuous dances and he has since contributed to the group mostly as a singer. Heechul ventured into the soundtrack singing career in 2009 by releasing his first single "First Star", as part of the soundtrack for the drama Loving You a Thousand Times. He has participated in writing lyrics for not only Super Junior but also for his project groups and other artists. Heechul debuted as a solo singer in 2019 with the digital single "Old Movie".

Heechul became a regular cast member on Radio Star in 2010, for which he won "Best Newcomer Award" at the 11th MBC Entertainment Awards. Following that, he made a breakthrough in his television host career after appearing on the variety shows Knowing Bros and Weekly Idol in 2015 and 2016. He has been a regular cast member on the reality shows My Little Old Boy and Delicious Rendezvous since 2019, for both of which he received the Excellence Award at the 13th SBS Entertainment Awards and Top Excellence Award at the 14th SBS Entertainment Awards.

== Life and career ==
=== 1983–2005: Early life and career beginnings ===
Kim Hee-chul was born in Ucheon-myeon, Hoengseong County, Gangwon Province, on July 10, 1983. His family consists of his parents and older sister, Kim Hee-jin. He graduated from Sangji Youngsoe College in 2004 with a bachelor's degree in English tourism translation. In addition, he graduated from Sangji University in 2009 with a bachelor's degree in informatics through Bachelor's Degree Examination for Self-Education.

In 2002, after seeing Psy, who was singing "Champion" on a television program, he searched the internet for entertainment companies and found out that SM Entertainment was having open auditions. He moved to Seoul when he was nineteen years old in October 2002 with his friends in order to take part in the auditions. Being unfamiliar with the area, he got lost and missed the open Starlight Casting System audition. However, they still allowed him to perform because of his looks. He sang the Korean national anthem and passed. He was cast and signed a contract with SM Entertainment in November 2002, becoming an official trainee and being trained in singing, acting, dancing, and other performing talents such as hosting and modeling.

He was initially placed in a four-member group called Four Seasons along with Jaejoong, Yunho and Kangin. The project group was dropped when Yunho and Jaejoong joined TVXQ in early 2003. Heechul was later preparing to debut as the main vocalist of TraxX, but had frequent clashes and misunderstandings with the person in charge at SM at the time. Frustrated, he abandoned his debut and returned to his hometown in Gangwon Province. Later, with TraxX's Jungmo's, Jay's, Yunho's and Donghae's encouragement, he returned to SM. He joined other trainees under the company to form the group Super Junior 05, the first generation of Super Junior.

His first acting role was in the second season of teen drama Sharp in 2005, co-starring labelmates Go Ara and Kibum. His first variety appearance also came in 2005, in the show Heroine 6. Later he acted as an extra in the KBS2 TV series Loveholic and was a regular MC for the cable music show Show! Music Tank. He also featured in his first advertisements for Lotte's Pepero.

=== 2005–2010: Debut with Super Junior, Super Junior-T and solo activities ===
Heechul officially debuted as part of the 12-member project group, Super Junior 05 on November 6, 2005, on SBS' music program Popular Songs, performing their first single, "Twins (Knock Out)". Their debut album SuperJunior05 (Twins) was released a month later on December 5, 2005, and debuted at number three on the monthly MIAK K-pop album charts. In March 2006, SM Entertainment began to recruit new members for the next Super Junior generation. However, this was met with fans' objections and strong opposition to the rotational style (much like popular rotational groups in Japan's pop music industry) that the group intended to be. Thus, plans changed and the company declared a halt in forming future Super Junior generations. Following the addition of thirteenth member Kyuhyun, the group dropped the suffix "05" and officially named as Super Junior. The re-polished group's first CD single "U" was released on June 7, 2006, which was their most successful single until the release of "Sorry, Sorry" in March 2009. Heechul faced criticism from Super Junior's fans when his voice cracked while performing "U", which negatively affected him and made him want to quit singing.

Apart from Super Junior's activities, Heechul has acted in several television series. In 2005, he landed his first leading role in the TV series Rainbow Romance, followed by a supporting role in the 2006 series Bad Family and Golden Bride at the end of 2007. Golden Bride achieved high ratings and Heechul received wider public recognition. He made his film debut in Attack on the Pin-Up Boys, which was released on July 26, 2007. The film failed to attract viewers and proved to be a big loss for SM Pictures. However, both versions of the film's DVD became best-sellers and were sold-out in both Korea and overseas markets. Stepping into the field of voice-over, he contributed his voice to the Korean-dubbed version of the American live action/animated film Alvin and the Chipmunks. Heechul was also a radio DJ on SBS Power FM's Young Street Radio with Park Hee-von from November 2005 until mid-2006. Moreover, he co-hosted SBS's weekly live music show Inkigayo as a substitute for Andy of Shinhwa, later going on to become a permanent host starting April 23, 2006. Heechul left his position on May 4, 2008, though in 2017, he retired from being a special MC on May 4, with his last day being April 30.

In February 2007, Heechul was placed in Super Junior's trot-singing subunit, Super Junior-T. The subunit debuted with the single "Rokuko", which quickly reached number one in weekly music chart and held the spot for two consecutive weeks. The debut also marked his comeback performance after recovering from an injury he had gotten in a car accident in August 2006. The subgroup returned in November 2008 with a debut in the Japanese music industry, releasing the Japanese version of "Rokuko", now titled "ROCK&GO". Heechul won the "Flower Boy" award at the first Mnet 20's Choice Awards held on August 29, 2007.

He played the role of Sonny in the musical Xanadu, the first production of SM Art Company, in rotation with his bandmate Kangin. Casting was carried out via a reality television program, and the musical ran from September 9 to December 28, 2008, at the Doosan Art Center, Goyang Oulim Nuri Arts Center and Busan Cultural Center in Seoul. In the same year, he co-hosted the program 8 vs 1 and later became a cast member on the shows Band of Brothers and Good Daddy. On March 19, 2008, he fallen down a flight of stairs and injured his nose. He subsequently took a break from all activities during recovery. Heechul starred in the surrogacy melodrama Loving You a Thousand Times, the first Korean drama to be exported to Bulgaria, in 2009. His first solo single, "First Star", was released on November 6, 2009, as part of the soundtrack for the drama. He hosted SBS Power FM's Kim Heechul's Youngstreet, from March 29, 2010, until mid-2011, returning to being a radio DJ after a four-year break. He was selected in December to be a host for Radio Star, the main segment in the talk show Golden Fishery. He was chosen to replace Shin Jung-hwan after he left the program following a gambling scandal. He won the "Best Newcomer Award" for his effort on the show at the 11th MBC Entertainment Awards.

=== 2011–2015: M&D, military enlistment and coming back to work ===
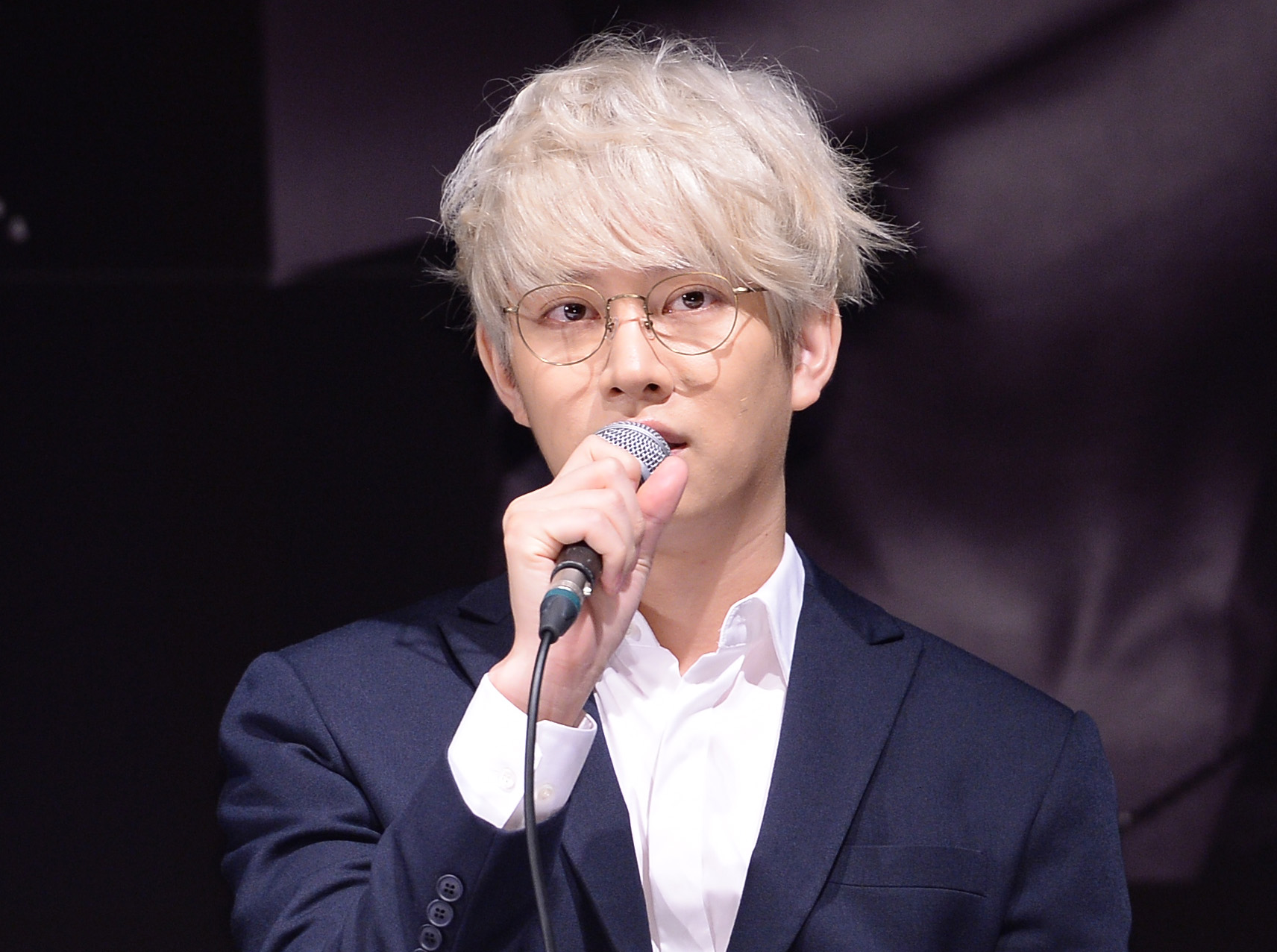
Heechul at the 10th Anniversary Special Album Devil press conference on July 15, 2015

In February 2011, he acted in a supporting role in the Chinese drama Melody of Youth, debuting in that industry. In the same year, he formed a project group with label mate Jungmo of TraxX, called M&D ("Midnight and Dawn" or "Miari and Dangae-dong", after the members' hometowns). They released their debut single "Close Ur Mouth" in June 2011. Heechul wrote the lyrics and directed the music video for the song, while Jungmo composed and produced it. Their first live performance was at Mnet's summer awards ceremony 20's Choice on July 7.

Heechul carried out his mandatory military service from September 1, 2011, to August 30, 2013. He served as a public service worker for 23 months after undergoing four weeks of basic training at the Nonsan military camp in South Chungcheong Province. At the time of his enlistment, he was a host in the variety show Secret, as well as one of the hosts of the talk show Radio Star. His role in Radio Star was taken over by bandmate Kyuhyun. Shortly after he had enlisted, Kim Jang-hoon released the song "Breakups Are So Like Me", which is a duet with Heechul. During live performances of the song on Music Bank and Show! Music Core, his part was performed by bandmates Yesung, Eunhyuk and Shindong. He was selected to be an internet broadcast radio DJ in January 2012 on Space for a Rest-Visible Radio. The program was aired through Seongdong District's homepage, as that's where Heechul was serving his two-year mandatory military service. He hosted from January 20 to May 18, 2012, and from January 14 to July 26, 2013.

Heechul chose Ssulzun, a debate program which discussed current issues that affect South Korea, as his comeback appearance after finishing military service in 2013. He was a regular cast member from September 2013 until July 2014. On December 11, 2013, Super Junior released their fifth official Japanese single, "Blue World", the group's first song involving Heechul after he came back from military service. He appeared on the second season of MBC's reality television program We Got Married: Global Edition in January 2014 as an on-screen couple with Taiwanese girl group member Puff Kuo and My Tutor Friend with Jeong Jun-ha as well. He also returned to the small screen with fantasy comedy drama Flower Grandpa Investigation Unit.

In 2015, he became an MC and cast member on entertainment programs such as Wednesday Food Talk, A Style For You, MAPS, Knowing Bros and Korean-Chinese program With You All The Way, the first Chinese variety show he was in charge of. He also won his first Chinese award at the 12th COSMO Beauty Awards. That same year, M&D released their first EP, Cottage Industry with the lead track "I Wish". It was released digitally on April 16 and physically on April 20. The title track was written and composed by the duo, and peaked at number two on the Gaon album Chart.

=== 2016–2018: Knowing Bros, Universe Cowards and career resurgence ===
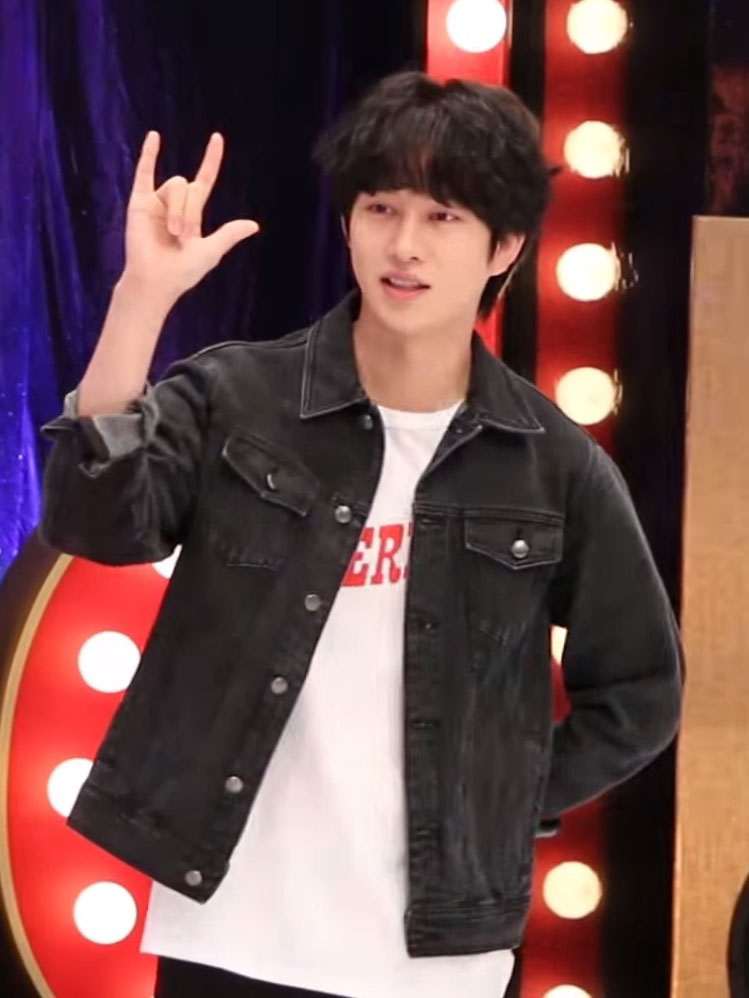
Heechul at the Singderella press conference in 2016

With Super Junior on a temporary hiatus for much of 2016 due to the enlistment of four other members, he returned to hosting. In March 2016, Heechul was confirmed to become a temporary host for Weekly Idol until October 5, replacing Jeong Hyeong-don He released a duet with Wheein for SM Station on April 15. The single, "Narcissus", was written by him and produced by Jungmo. M&D returned as Kim Heechul & Kim Jungmo with a second mini-album titled Goody Bag and the trot-rock lead track "Ulsanbawi" on July 12. In June, he appeared in the third season of the Chinese dating variety show Perhaps Love with Chinese actress and singer Li Feier, his second time being in a virtual relationship.

In the fall of 2016, Heechul and Buzz member Min Kyung-hoon released a duet titled "Sweet Dream". The duo is known as Universe Cowards, a name they came up with while recording Knowing Bros. It is a mix of Heechul's nickname "Universe Star" and Buzz's song "Coward". The song proved to be successful, topping the South Korean Gaon Digital Chart, an achievement known as an "all-kill". "Sweet Dream" won the Best Rock Song award at the 9th Melon Music Awards in 2017. Heechul also participated in the song "Melody", a collaboration with the South Korean rock band Eve. The pre-release single was released on December 23, a nod to the band's debut on Christmas Eve in 1997.

His career as an MC made a breakthrough after he appeared on Knowing Bros and Weekly Idol. He started receiving more MC roles from other shows, such as Phantom Singer, Singderella and Game Show Yoo Hee Nak Rak. He continued participating in entertainment programs in 2017, hosting shows such as Life Bar, My Daughter's Men, and Idol School.

Heechul participated in both seasons of Super Junior's own variety show Super TV in 2018. He also joined the cast of 1 Percent of Friendship and travel-reality show Where Are You Going, DdaengChul. He was cast in his second game show Begin A Game in October 2018. Following the success of "Sweet Dream", Universe Cowards returned in February 2018 with "Falling Blossoms". The song is part of the Knowing Bros music video competition. Min Kyung-hoon wrote the lyrics to "Falling Blossoms" with his Buzz bandmates Yoo Woo-hyun and Shin Joon-ki. The song peaked at number 15 on Gaon Digital Chart, and won the duo the "Best Rock Song" award at the 10th Melon Music Awards held on December 1, 2018, making them the only artist to win the award two years in a row.

=== 2019–present: Solo music and established TV personality ===
Heechul's debut solo digital single "Old Movie", was released on April 24, 2019, topping the charts in seven different countries He held his first talk show event on May 4 and 5, which sold out in one minute from the start of internet ticket booking. Appearing in more than ten programs over the course of 2019, he also became a fixed cast member on various shows such as My Little Old Boy, Why Did You Come To My House?, and Delicious Rendezvous. He also starred in the 2019 film Hello, My Cat. On December 3, 2019, he was awarded the "Person of the Year" award at 2019 COSMO Glam Night. Heechul and Lee Soo-geun collaborated as the project group Woojoo Jjokkomi and released a cover of Mr. 2's song "White Winter" for SM Station X 4 LOVEs for Winter project. His performance in My Little Old Boy and Delicious Rendezvous earned him Excellence award at the 13th SBS Entertainment Awards.

Heechul continued his TV personality career in 2020, appearing in Studio Music Hall, Love of 7.7 Billion, and 20th Century Hit Song. On May 10, he earned his first Baeksang Arts Awards nomination at 56th ceremony in the Best Male Variety Performer category for Knowing Bros. On December 1, it was announced that Heechul would be filling in as a temporary MC for KBS2's Problem Child in House, in place of the program's regular MC Jung Hyung-don until February 16, when he returning to active promotions. He won the "Top Excellence Award" at the 14th SBS Entertainment Awards.

In 2021, he became the main host of Friends, Long Live Independence and Falling for Korea - Transnational Couples. He also appeared in Steel Troops and as first Protagonist in Duck's Tour. His web drama with Moon Ga-young Recipe for Youth which was originally set to be released in 2016, officially premiere on March 14 via BbangyaTV. In June, Delicious Rendezvous undergo reorganization and Heechul leave his place as member. On December 18, 2021, Kim won the Grand Prize (Daesang) with the My Little Old Boy team (Note: Consisting of Shin Dong-yup, Seo Jang-hoon, Cho Hye-seon, Kim Sun-ja, Park Young-hye, Lee Sang-min, Tak Jae-hoon, Im Won-hee, Kim Joon-ho, Kim Jong-kook, Lee Tae-sung, Oh Min-suk, Park Goon, Choi Jin-hyuk) at the 2021 SBS Entertainment Awards.

In 2022 to 2023, he appeared in several web show such as Real Marketing Show "Production 522", Game Addendum, Lineage W Rap Up, Pink Rye and One Earth: ARTPIA. He also appeared as a new MC for Boss in the Mirror. Heechul host Chengdong Travel Visual Radio on September 24, 2022.

== Personal life ==
=== Car accident ===
On August 10, 2006, Heechul was involved in a car accident while heading back to Seoul from Mokpo after attending the funeral of fellow Super Junior member Donghae's father. The tires malfunctioned while his car attempted to switch lanes. Heechul fractured his left leg, requiring him to undergo surgery where seven iron rods were inserted. He also sustained other injuries, including a tear in his tongue which required stitches.

Heechul was advised to stop all activities for a period of twelve weeks. He was released from the hospital on September 14, 2006, but continued to receive out-patient care. He returned to the hospital to have a second surgery to remove some of the iron rods in his leg on October 10, and briefly returned to work in late October to film the final three episodes of MBC's Rainbow Romance while still in a cast and wheelchair. He made his comeback on November 25 during the Mnet KM Music Festival. Six months after the accident, Heechul officially returned to individual activities such as variety show and hosting appearances. The remaining rods in his leg were removed in 2008.

==== Aftermath ====
Heechul is still receiving treatment, and can no longer dance on live stages, often only making sporadic appearances for the latter half of the songs. He started performing this way after Super Junior's third album Sorry, Sorry was completed. He still performed regularly until 2017, despite the condition of his legs. In March 2018, it was reported that Heechul would not be participating in music show performances of Super Junior's repackage album Replay due to health concerns, but would still take part in other promotions as normal. He announced in July that he has decided not to participate at all on the group's first mini album One More Time to focus on recovering his health. However, after the release of a teaser photo that featured Heechul, Label SJ announced that he had taken part in comeback preparations minimally.

Label SJ confirmed in a statement in August 2019 that Heechul decided to sit out of performances for their upcoming ninth album Time Slip and the Super Show 8 concert, but will be included in the album as well as Super Junior's variety appearances. The label further clarified in March 2020 that although he may not be able to perform on stage, he is still participating in Super Junior albums and other content by recording, as well as taking part in activities such as jacket photoshoots and MV filming. In 2025, on the January 12 episode of SBS's "My Little Old Boy", he said, "I've never mentioned this before, but I'm actually disabled. There's a disability sticker for cars. I went to get it with my manager but decided not to take it, thinking 'No, I need to live a more active life', and turned back without it."

=== Military service ===
Because of the injuries he sustained in a 2006 car accident, Kim received a Grade 4 classification and was assigned to supplementary service as a public service worker. On September 1, 2011, Kim entered the Korea Army Training Center in Nonsan and completed four weeks of basic military training before beginning his public-service assignment at the Seongdong District Office in Seoul.

During his service at the Seongdong District Office, Kim hosted the Friday segment Kim Heechul's Seongdong Café on the district's web-radio program Space for a Rest – Visible Radio as part of his public-service duties.

Kim later said that, during his military re-examination at the Military Manpower Administration, an official told him that his injuries would ordinarily have qualified him for exemption but recommended that he serve as a public service worker because of the public sensitivity surrounding celebrity military service following the Yoo Seung-jun controversy.

== Public image and artistry ==
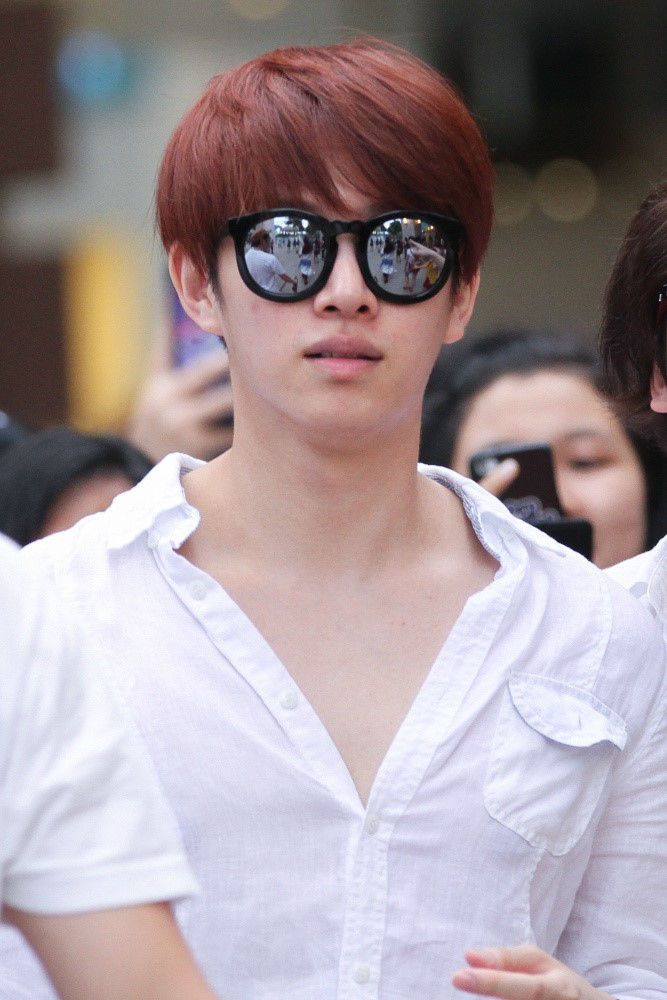
Heechul at Universal Studios Singapore in 2013

Heechul's production discography consists predominately of rock music, proving his love for traditional Korean style rock. He has said that he had a dream about a rock band when he was a teenager and trainee. An active lyricist, he has written several of Super Junior's songs, including "Show Me Your Love", "Oops", and "Lo Siento". Moreover, he has written lyrics for his project group Kim Heechul & Kim Jungmo's songs "I Wish", "Narcissus", and "Ulsanbawi", as well as "Sweet Dream" for Universe Cowards. In addition, he wrote the lyrics for Orange Caramel's "Shanghai Romance", which peaked at number eight on the Gaon Digital Chart.

Heechul has been praised for being a celebrity and model idol group member who rarely has scandals. He has spoken openly about the malicious comments in South Korea, as well as mental health. In October 2020, Ko Seung Woo and Jeong Chong Myeong credited Heechul alongside IU and Suga, as part of the force driving malicious commenters away for good. His androgynous appearance has caused rumors regarding his sexuality since his debut, being known for having a "pretty boy" look. He never denied being gay because he believes that "It'd be rude if I denied it so strongly." Heechul has also openly expressed his support for the LGBT community.

"I'm not gay. I like women. But I realized that if I say I'm not and vehemently deny it, it's rude and hurtful to people who are actually gay. It's just a matter of preference, and it's just that everyone is different with different values. I decided I don't care even if people who have prejudices about me think that way." — Kim Heechul in 2017

=== Impact and influence ===
In 2006, Cyworld selected Kim Hee-chul's mini homepage as the most visited among celebrities. He also ranked first in the Cyworld visitor rankings for the first half of 2007. He took ninth place in the "2010 Twitter Trend Analysis" in People Category. MTV K conducted a Top 10 Cross-Dressing idols poll in 2011 in which Heechul emerged as the champion. He made a few appearances as "Lady HeeHee" throughout Super Show 3, as well as SM Town in Paris. Lady Gaga saw his imitation and praised him, saying: "He looks amazing!".

Heechul was one of the "10 Most Anticipated K-Stars of 2017" in an online poll organized by the Chinese entertainment magazine People's Daily. He was included in the "Forbes Korea Power Celebrity" list for the first time in 2020, placing tenth in the general rank. He was also ranked the 4th most powerful person in the broadcasting sector and the 5th most powerful person on SNS for having 5.38 million followers.

== Other ventures ==
=== Philanthropy and activism ===
On April 5, 2019, Heechul donated ₩30,000,000 (about US$26,300) to help those who were affected by Goseong Fire of 2019, through the organization "Fruits of Love". The MCs of variety show A Style For You Heechul, Hara, Bora and Hani held a flea market in episode 12 where special items that the MCs had created and bought personally were sold. All the proceeds earned through the flea market were donated to the "Save the Children" Relief Group. Heechul's total donation amounted to ₩3,912,700 (about US$3,912), and went to children in Nepal. He donated all proceeds from a CF he did in March 2020 as part of the cast of Delicious Rendezvous to COVID-19 relief charities. He also donated the profits from his CF with Kang Ho-dong and Lee Soo-geun to Green Dream Together project of the "Green Umbrella Children's Foundation". On March 14, 2022, Kim made a donation ₩100 millions to Community Chest of Korea for Fruit of Love to help the victims of the massive wildfire that started in Uljin, Gyeongbuk and has spread to Samcheok, Gangwon. In July 2023, The Blue Tree Foundation (Youth Violence Prevention Foundation) announced that Kim Hee-chul, donated 100 million won to operate the School Violence Research Institute ahead of his birthday. In November 2025, he donated KRW 100 million to Asan Medical Center for the treatment of cancer patients, marking the 20th anniversary of his debut.

Heechul has been one of the Korean Red Cross goodwill ambassadors of blood donation since 2007 as part of Super Junior. He participated in the EYE PROMISE YOU campaign held in 2017. The campaign aims to improve organ donation awareness and activate corneal donation. In 2019, Heechul joined the National Health Insurance Service as the promotional ambassador for anti-smoking. He also took part in The CELEBe Video Donation Campaign from April 2020 with numerous celebrities and fans. He joined the emergency disaster donation campaign to overcome COVID-19 in Hoengseong County on June 29, 2020. In March 2022, he became a member of the Honor Society. In April 2023, he was appointed as a public relations ambassador for The Blue Tree Foundation, an NGO working to cure and prevent school violence.

Heechul hosted the 13th Non-Smoking Festival Concert on December 20, 2019.

=== Endorsements ===
Heechul is an endorser of a wide range of brands in and outside South Korea. He got his first solo endorsement deal with Lotte's Pepero in 2005. After appearing on Knowing Bros and his famous Pick Miwon CF, he started receiving more endorsement offers. Among the brands he has promoted are G-Market, Mistral, Pelicana Chicken, Dr.Groot, WHIA and Dyson. In 2021, Heechul collaborated with SM C&C and SM Entertainment Group artists and launched Eco Friendly Toohbrush and Toothpaste 옳치 옳치 (Right Toothbrush). On December 21, 2022, Heechul and Im Yoon-ah announced as promotional models for Ragnarok Online Mobile 3D Action MMORPG.

In 2015, Heechul was announced as the ambassador of Hoengseong County at the 20th Hoengseong County Ambassador appointment ceremony. He was also the ambassador of 1st Seoul Comic-Con 2017 by San Diego Comic-Con. Later that year, he was chosen as the honorary tourism ambassador for Hoengseong beef in 17th International Exhibition of Food & Drink, Hotel, Restaurant & Foodservice Equipment, Supplies & Services or HOFEX 2017 in Hong Kong. In 2020, Heechul appointed as the ambassador for the 16th Online Hoengseong Korean Beef Festival. In 2021, he has appointed as a public relations ambassador in Wonju.

=== League of Legends ===
Heechul is an avid fan of the video game League of Legends, one of the most popular video games in South Korea. It was mentioned in his show Game Show Yoo Hee Nak Rak that he is a high-level player with diamond rankings. On November 27, 2013, he appeared on OGN's Pandora TV LoL Champions as a Special Commentator and Guest player. In February 2015, the famous LoL team SK Telecom T1 sponsored a special match titled the Celebrity League of Legends Invitational Event Match. SKT T-LoL invited various celebrities to join in a match against professional LoL gamers. The celebrity team including Heechul ultimately lost.

In August 2016, he attended the League of Legends Pro League 5th Anniversary in China, which included the Regional Final with four Chinese teams competing for a spot in the World Championship. He also competed in a Korea vs. China Celebrity Showmatch in commemoration. On October 9, he appeared on OGN as a special commentator for the LoL World Championship. In November, Heechul began participating in SM Entertainment's League of Legends tournament 2016 SM Super Idol League, where he and labelmate Baekhyun played the game with both professional players and fans from South Korea and China.

In June 2020, it was reported that Kim Hee-chul would be a part of the first-round investment group that would seek to provide funds for Brion Sports Business Group's stake for a spot in League of Legends Champions Korea. Heechul was one of four celebrities to join the venture and brought on as E-sports company directors, and given a role to fulfil within the organization. They tasked with sharing their insight on how to build a brand, and a platform from where the organization can communicate and build a relationship with fans.

=== YouTube ===
Heechul started his YouTube channel called "HEEtube 김희철" on November 18, 2018. He held his first live gaming stream on December 5, 2018. He revealed during an episode of TV show Six-Party Talks that he received ₩15,000 in the first month of the channel. Heechul received a silver play button for having more than 100 thousand subscribers on his channel in April 2019. He took a break from posting from January 2, 2020, until March 5, 2020.

== Discography ==
=== Singles ===
==== As lead artist ====
Title	Year	Album
"옛날 사람 (Old Movie)"	2019	Non-album single

==== Collaborations ====
Title	Year	Peak chart positions		Sales	Album
Title	Year	KOR		Sales	Album
Title	Year	Gaon	Hot	Sales	Album
"The Way An Idol Breaks Up" (with. Krystal Jung)	2010	—	—	—N/a	Super Junior The 3rd Asia Tour Concert Album: Super Show 3
"Breakups Are So Like Me" (with. Kim Jang-hoon)	2011	33	55	KOR: 418,554+	Non-album single
"Sweet Dream" (with. Min Kyung-hoon)	2016	1	*	KOR: 938,837+	SM Station Season 1
"Charm of Life" (with. Shindong, Eunhyuk, and Solar)	2017	—	—	—N/a	SM Station Season 2
"Falling Blossoms" (with. Min Kyung-hoon)	2018	15	14	—N/a	Non-album single
"White Winter" (with. Lee Soo-geun)	2019	—	—	—N/a	SM Station X 4 LOVEs for Winter
"Hanryang" (with. Min Kyung Hoon, feat. BIBI, and Prod. DinDin)	2020	190	72	—N/a	Non-album single
"SsakSsakYi" (with. Knowing Bros Casts)	2021	—	—	—N/a	Knowing Brother's Children's Song Project
"—" denotes releases that did not chart or were not released in that region. "*" denotes the chart did not exist at that time.

==== Promotional singles ====
Title	Year	Peak chart positions	Sales	Album
Title	Year	KOR Gaon	Sales	Album
"You Are A Miracle" (Note: SBS Gayo Daejeon's Friendship Project) (featuring Various Artists)	2013	32	KOR: 53,496+	Non-album single
"—" denotes releases that did not chart or were not released in that region.

==== As featured artist ====
Title	Year	Album	Ref.
"Barbie Girl" (Jessica featuring Heechul)	2010	Girls' Generation 1st Asia Tour: Into the New World	
"King Wang Zzang" (Defconn featuring Heechul)	2010	King Wang Zzang	
"Melody" (Eve featuring Heechul)	2016	Romantic Show	

==== Soundtrack ====
Title	Year	Album	Ref.
"Can It Be Love?" (Kim Hyung-joong featuring Cast of Rainbow Romance)	2006	Rainbow Romance OST	
"A Family" (Go Hyun Wook featuring Cast of Bad Family (Note: (Rap. Kim Hee-chul of Super Junior, Feat. Kim Myung-min, Nam Sang-mi, Hyun Young, Park Jin-woo)))	2006	Bad Family OST	
"Don't Walk Away" (with. Kim Seong-gi, Hong Ji Min, Kim Hee-won)	2008	Xanadu OST	
"First Star"	2009	Loving You a Thousand Times OST	

== Filmography ==
=== List of present programs ===
Title	Year	Role	Notes	Ref.
Knowing Bros	2015–present	Cast member		
My Little Old Boy	2019–present	Cast member	Episodes 153–present	
20th Century Hit Song	2020–present	Host		

== Bibliography ==
Title	Year	Language	ISBN-10	ISBN-13	Ref.
Because It Is Jin Xiche (With CD)	2013	Chinese	7122173127	978-7122173126	
The ZZINPANG Family	2013	Korean	-	-	
"My Ramen – Ful Life" – Today, eating noodles on the Go. Hokkaido Series!	2017	Japanese	4835632192	978-4835632193	
Girl Groups 101.Know These Things First	2017	Korean	-	-	

== See also ==
- Super Junior discography
- Super Junior filmography
- List of awards and nominations received by Super Junior
