= Secret (2011 TV series) =

South Korean television show

- Genre: Game show, Talk show
- Starring: Lee Hwi-jae; Shin Bong-sun; Kim Hee-chul; Boom
- Country of origin: South Korea
- Original language: Korean
- No. of episodes: 23

Original release
- Network: KBS2
- Release: June 4, 2011 – November 5, 2011

Secret (Korean: 시크릿), subtitled Are You a Good Person?, is a South Korean game-talk show featuring secrets of celebrities. Originally airing after Immortal Songs 2, the program faced difficulty when Immortal Songs 2 aired for too long, thus eating into the airtime of Secret. On one occasion, the program only aired for three minutes on July 23, 2011.

== Format ==
Stars must play games and succeed to prevent a secret of theirs from being revealed by a friend.

== Hosts ==
- Lee Hwi-jae
- Shin Bong-sun
- Kim Hee-chul (Episode 1-14)
- Boom (Episode 17-23)

== List of episodes ==
Episode	Air Date	Guests
1	June 4, 2011	Baek Ji-young, Kim Hyun-jung, Choi Yeo-jin, Simon Dominic, Jun Hyun-moo, Kim Tae-hyun
2	June 11, 2011	Baek Ji-young, Kim Hyun-jung, Choi Yeo-jin, Simon Dominic, Jun Hyun-moo, Kim Tae-hyun
3	June 18, 2011	Baek Ji-young, Kim Hyun-jung, Choi Yeo-jin, Simon Dominic, Jun Hyun-moo, Kim Tae-hyun
4	June 25, 2011	Park Jung-ah, Kahi, Brian Joo, Hong Rok-gi, Kim Sook, Kim Tae-hyun
5	July 2, 2011	Park Jung-ah, Kahi, Brian Joo, Hong Rok-gi, Kim Sook, Kim Tae-hyun
6	July 9, 2011	Kim Hyun-joong, Tony An, Eun Ji-won, Lee Soo-geun, Kim Jong-min, Narsha, Nana, Kim Tae-hyun
7	July 16, 2011	Kim Hyun-joong, Tony An, Eun Ji-won, Lee Soo-geun, Kim Jong-min, Narsha, Nana, Kim Tae-hyun
8	July 23, 2011	Kim Hyun-joong, Tony An, Eun Ji-won, Lee Soo-geun, Kim Jong-min, Narsha, Nana, Kim Tae-hyun
9	July 30, 2011	Kim Hyun-joong, Tony An, Eun Ji-won, Lee Soo-geun, Kim Jong-min, Narsha, Nana, Kim Tae-hyun
10	August 6, 2011	Kim Hyun-joong, Tony An, Eun Ji-won, Lee Soo-geun, Kim Jong-min, Narsha, Nana
11	August 13, 2011	Ok Taec-yeon, Hwanhee, Hwang Kwanghee, G.NA, Kim Jae-kyung, Shim Eun-jin
12	August 20, 2011	Ok Taec-yeon, Hwanhee, Hwang Kwanghee, G.NA, Kim Jae-kyung, Shim Eun-jin
13	August 27, 2011	Jang Woo-hyuk, Kim Jun-ho, Kim Dae-hee, Hwayobi, Hyuna, Min
14	September 3, 2011	Jang Woo-hyuk, Kim Jun-ho, Kim Dae-hee, Hwayobi, Hyuna, Min
15	September 10, 2011	Nam Hee-suk, Boom, Kim Byung-man, Jang Dong-min, Ryu Dam, Jo Se-ho, Chang-hie Nam
16	September 17, 2011	Nam Hee-suk, Boom, Kim Byung-man, Jang Dong-min, Ryu Dam, Jo Se-ho, Chang-hie Nam
17	September 24, 2011	Park Gyu-ri, Goo Hara, Jeon So-yeon, Kim Yoonji, Hwang Hyun-hee, Han Min Gwan, Choi Hyo-jong, Heo Kyung-hwan, Jo Se-ho
18	October 1, 2011	Park Gyu-ri, Goo Hara, Jeon So-yeon, Kim Yoonji, Hwang Hyun-hee, Han Min Gwan, Choi Hyo-jong, Heo Kyung-hwan, Jo Se-ho
19	October 8, 2011	Kim Jae-kyung, Go Woo-ri, Ohseungah, Hyunyoung, Heo Kyung-hwan, Hwang Hyun-hee, Park Youngjin, Yang Sang-guk, Jo Se-ho
20	October 15, 2011	Kim Jae-kyung, Go Woo-ri, Ohseungah, Hyunyoung, Heo Kyung-hwan, Hwang Hyun-hee, Park Youngjin, Yang Sang-guk, Jo Se-ho
21	October 22, 2011	Gain, Narsha, JeA, Miryo, Kim Jong-min, Mighty Mouth, Heo Kyung-hwan, Jo Se-ho
22	October 29, 2011	Gain, Narsha, JeA, Miryo, Kim Jong-min, Mighty Mouth, Heo Kyung-hwan, Jo Se-ho
23	November 5, 2011	Gain, Narsha, JeA, Miryo, Kim Jong-min, Mighty Mouth, Heo Kyung-hwan, Jo Se-ho

== Ratings ==
In the tables below, the blue numbers represent the lowest ratings and the red numbers represent the highest ratings.

Episode #	Original broadcast date	Average audience share			
Episode #	Original broadcast date	TNmS Ratings		AGB Nielsen	
Episode #	Original broadcast date	Nationwide	Seoul National Capital Area	Nationwide	Seoul National Capital Area
1	June 4, 2011	5.7%	6.0%	5.9%	7.0%
2	June 11, 2011	3.1%	4.0%	4.0%	5.0%
3	June 18, 2011	5.2%	5.4%	4.9%	5.5%
4	June 25, 2011	3.7%	4.6%	4.3%	4.8%
5	July 2, 2011	2.2%	2.9%	2.9%	3.0%
6	July 9, 2011	3.7%	3.9%	4.4%	5.2%
7	July 16, 2011	4.3%	5.3%	5.5%	6.5%
8	July 23, 2011	4.8%	5.2%	5.7%	6.7%
9	July 30, 2011	3.6%	4.0%	4.2%	4.3%
10	August 6, 2011	5.1%	5.3%	4.0%	4.4%
11	August 13, 2011	4.1%	4.7%	4.2%	4.3%
12	August 20, 2011	4.4%	4.7%	5.1%	5.2%
13	August 27, 2011	3.3%	3.8%	3.9%	4.0%
14	September 3, 2011	4.4%	5.3%	4.0%	5.0%
15	September 10, 2011	3.9%	4.9%	4.3%	4.8%
16	September 17, 2011	3.1%	4.4%	4.1%	5.0%
17	September 24, 2011	3.1%	4.8%	3.5%	4.4%
18	October 1, 2011	3.3%	4.5%	2.9%	3.2%
19	October 8, 2011	2.1%	3.1%	2.9%	3.8%
20	October 15, 2011	2.7%	3.9%	2.8%	3.6%
21	October 22, 2011	3.8%	3.9%	3.3%	3.4%
22	October 29, 2011	4.9%	5.6%	4.7%	5.6%
23	November 5, 2011	3.5%	5.1%	3.3%	4.3%
