= Falling Blossoms =

Single by Universe Cowards: Kim Hee-chul x Min Kyung-hoon
- Released: February 17, 2018
- Genre: Pop rock
- Length: 4:10
- Label: CJ E&M Music
- Composers: Kim Heechul, Min Kyung-hoon
- Lyricist: Min Kyung-hoon

Universe Cowards singles chronology
"Sweet Dream" (2016)	"Falling Blossoms" (2018)	"Hanryang" (2020)

Music video
- Falling Blossoms on YouTube

Falling Blossoms (Korean: 후유증; RR: Huyujeung) is the second single by the South Korean artists Kim Hee-chul and Min Kyung-hoon, the duo who is known as Universe Cowards (우주겁쟁이). Their stage name is a mix of Heechul's nickname Universe Star and Buzz's song Coward.

== Background and release ==
The single is released a year after the success of their first collaboration and is part of Knowing Bros music video competition, released alongside Kim Young-chul's "Andenayon" and Kang Ho-dong's "I Kick My Luck Away".

Min Kyung-hoon wrote the lyrics to "Falling Blossoms" with his Buzz bandmates Yoon Woo-hyun and Shin Joon-ki.

== Reception ==
Billboard described it as "soft pop-rock tune that grows to a soaring, emotional cacophony" and complimented how their music video was one of the most inclusive music videos South Korea's seen in some time.

In November, Kim Hee-chul and Min Kyung-hoon were again nominated for Best Rock Song at the 10th Melon Music Awards, which they later won on December 1, making them the only artist to win the award two years in a row.

== Music video ==
Min acts as the head of the family in lieu of his father and developmentally disabled older brother, portrayed by Kim, but runs into trouble with gang members while trying to help his mother (Park Mi-sun) and brother. The gang beats Kim up in front of his teacher (Fromis 9's Roh Ji-sun) to get to Min. Min successfully carries out revenge after he was berated by their mother for his failure to protect Kim. As the gang leader, played by Lee Sang-Min tries to lure Min into an alleyway as an attempt of murder, it was Kim who receives the blow instead after he read the message on Min's phone, leaving the gang leader in disbelief as he ran away. Min later finds a Dying Kim on the alleyway, with Kim handing over a heartful letter he wrote to Min before he succumbs to his wound. A tearful Min then sits dejectedly beside his now-deceased brother, while holding his hand. The accompanying music video was directed by Super Junior's Shindong.

== Track listing ==
No.	Title	Lyrics	Music	Arrangement	Length
1.	"Falling Blossoms"	Min Kyung-hoon, Shin Joon-ki, Yoon Woo-hyun	Lee Sang-joon, Cha Kil-wan	Cha Kil-wan	04:10
2.	"Falling Blossoms (Inst.)"		Lee Sang-joon, Cha Kil-wan	Cha Kil-wan	04:10
Total length:					08:20

== Charts ==
Peak chart positions
KOR Gaon	KOR Hot
15	14

== Accolades ==
Year	Award	Category	Result	Ref.
2018	10th Melon Music Awards	Best Rock Song	Won	
2019	8th Gaon Chart Music Awards	Song of the Year (February)	Nominated	
