= Knowing Bros =

Television entertainment program

- Knowing Bros Poster
- Hangul: 아는 형님
- Hanja: 아는 兄님
- RR: Aneun hyeongnim
- MR: Anŭn hyŏngnim
- Genre: Reality television Talk show
- Written by: Hwang Sun-young; Jeong Yun-hui; Yoo Ji-hui; Hwang Seon-yeong; Choi Ji-yeong; Lee Ji-yeong; Jeon Min-hee; Kim Yeo-won
- Directed by: Kim Soo-ah; Jeong Seung-il; Yun Yeo-jun; Mun Min-jeong; Go Hye-jin; Heo Seo-mun
- Creative director: Jo Seung-wook
- Starring: Kang Ho-dong; Seo Jang-hoon; Kim Young-chul; Lee Soo-geun; Kim Hee-chul; Min Kyung-hoon; Lee Sang-min; Shindong; Kim Shin-young
- Country of origin: South Korea
- Original language: Korean
- No. of episodes: 530 (list of episodes)

Production
- Running time: 120 minutes
- Production company: SM C&C

Original release
- Network: JTBC
- Release: December 5, 2015 – present

Knowing Bros (Korean: 아는 형님; RR: Aneun hyeongnim), also known as Men on a Mission or Ask Us Anything, is a South Korean television entertainment program produced by SM C&C that premiered on December 5, 2015, and currently airs on Saturdays at JTBC. Although the show has taken on different formats in some episodes, the program features a high school classroom setting with the fixed cast – the titular "brothers" – acting as same-aged students. Guests arrive posing as visiting students from another school and are interviewed by the cast in a talk show segment; the program's second half usually features a variety segment, with the cast and guests taking of activities such as games, talent show, or improvisational acting.

Knowing Bros' current fixed cast includes Kang Ho-dong, Lee Soo-geun, Kim Young-chul, Seo Jang-hoon, Kim Hee-chul, Min Kyung-hoon, Lee Sangmin, Shindong, and Kim Shin-young; Hwang Chi-yeul and Kim Se-hwang were initial cast members in the program's first few episodes. Comedian Lee Jin-ho was added as a fixed cast member in episode 304 and he left after episode 454. Jang Sung-kyu and announcer Kim Hwan have appeared as recurring special guests by hosting the show's game segments. Originally, Shindong was also a recurring guest before being promoted to a regular cast member in episode 444. After appearing as a guest several times, comedienne Kim Shin-young was added as the first female cast member in episode 528.

== Format ==
The current format (from episode 17) explores the high school concept where the cast members act like students in a classroom while guests come as newly transferred students. Most of the segments for this format portray activities that every student would do with their classmates. Subsequently, the program sometimes diversifies at the end with a segment outside of the school concept. This format has received praise from the viewers and led to a significant increase in ratings and popularity of the program.

A notable aspect of the show is the usage of the banmal (반말; "informal language") manner of speech used by everyone regardless of their age or seniority, thus disregarding the Korean language's strict seniority rules with spoken language and the sunbae-hoobae hierarchy in the Korean entertainment industry. The informal speech and casual setting also encourages the guests and cast to interact with each other as schoolmates often do, leading them to be comfortable enough to tease one another.

There are at least two permanent segments, which have defined the Brother School format:

- Entrance Application – a segment where a cast member (typically Lee Soo-Geun) reads the application forms the guests filled beforehand and other cast members comment on them. A highlight of this segment is the guests' preference for which cast members they would like or would not like to sit next to. The guests typically show their strengths and/or weaknesses through this segment.
- Guess About Me – a segment where the guests have prepared several questions related to themselves. Some of the questions are vague or extremely private and concern something the guests have never revealed to the public. In another format, idol groups with more than 5 members that are visiting for the first time will have their names covered, and as Heechul reveals a fact about the member, the group members would try to confuse the cast.

=== Segments ===
The episodes may also feature any of the following segments, usually within, in between, or following the above permanent segments:

- Second Period – a segment that usually comes after the permanent segments and varies between guests. In most cases, the guests have made suggestions on the activities for this segment. Examples include counseling sessions, art class, and physical education class.
- Let's Play – a short segment where the guests challenge the cast members to a game which the former is confident in winning, usually by unorthodox means such as on-the-spot rules. The segment usually ends with a challenge where the guest needs to defeat every cast member consecutively.
- Three No's (No Concept, No Basis, No Script) – a segment that revolves around an ad-libbed skit where the cast members and guests are not given any dialogue or definite storyline. They can only rely on the overall theme of the particular week's skit and their own comedic timing.
- Music Class (Songstagram) – a segment where the guests have created a list of songs with a specific theme of their preference. The segment focuses on the cast members' effort in guessing all of them in the correct order. There are often hints such as release date, characteristics, or "Jonghyun's game" as it was introduced in ep. 29 by the late Jonghyun (Shinee), wherein the beginning syllable/note of a verse is given with its rhythm to help the members guess the song name.
- Lee Sang-min Time – formally introduced in ep. 56 and formerly called Choose Your Type, is a short segment wherein the guests (usually the females) are briefed by Lee Sang-min to choose any of the cast members (plus any accompanying male guest) as their ideal partner. The specifications are that all members are "equal" in terms of legal, socioeconomic, & civil statuses; and that the choice is based only on their physical appearances and personalities.
- Dancestagram – formally introduced in ep. 57 by Chanmi (AOA). In Psy's episode it became a segment where the PD plays the beginning syllable/note of a song and they have to guess the title, lyrics, and dance move.
- 99 Seconds Teamwork Competition – a segment that is often used when a large group of people are guests on the program, such as idol groups. The segment varies each episode in terms of missions, but the members and guests must complete them within 99 seconds. If a team manages to complete them in time, the other team is given a chance to produce a better time record.
- Classical Culture Class – a segment all about pop culture references to forgotten decades.
- Imagination Time – a segment which starts with a warm-up, like drawing something from shapes, and guessing lip-synced words. The highlight of "Imagination Time" (상상력 시간) is Guess the Drama Line. The members and guests have to guess what the next line of the scene from a drama shown to them is.
- Knowing Lunch – a segment that comes in between the Entrance Application segment and the Guess About Me segment. The members and guests answer questions (either in an individual battle or as a team) given by the production team and if they are guessed correctly they can eat one of the numerous side dishes selected, other than white rice and light soy sauce that was already provided beforehand.
  - A variation of this is that each member must ask a question of their choice, but only the specified number of people can guess correctly. For example: Only 4 people can answer this question correctly: What is the name of the famous picture painted by Norwegian painter Edvard Munch? In ep. 183, since Jeon So-mi answered with a transliteration of its English name (The Scream), and only 3 others answered by its Korean name, it was still deemed as a pass after review.
  - There is also one question where a specially requested item is covered under a cloche. The way to gain the food item varies in each episode.
- XXX Scholarship Quiz – a second half segment in Brother School, where Shindong (Super Junior) enters the classroom and hosts the quiz. The members and guests form pairs and play the games to enjoy the food. Typically this consists of two segments:
  - Consonants Charades: When two consonants are given, whichever pair hits the buzzer first gets to answer. To answer, one of the pair has to express the word without saying what the word is, and the other has to guess the word.
  - Mix Music Quiz: Shindong sings the lyrics to song "B" in the melody of song "A". One of the pair has to answer song "A" and its singer, and the other of the pair has to answer song "B" and its singer.
- Job Consultation Room – an official corner of the show after the Brother School segment for the episode has ended. Jang Sung-kyu, Shindong and Jeong Se-woon would let guests (different from in Brother School), as Variety Job Lookers, to prove their variety skills to the three.
- After School Activities – the cast members each learn something unique that is not done during the "lesson" in Brother School. This segment is shown on both TV and YouTube, after the end of a Knowing Bros episode.
  - Dong Dong Shin Ki: Kang Ho-dong, together with Shindong (Super Junior), visits various idols and learn idol songs choreographs. Several other guests will then watch the final dancing videos and comment on them. This activity lasted from July 11 to October 24, 2020.
  - Universe Hipsters: Universe Cowards (Kim Hee-chul, Min Kyung-hoon) visit rappers and learn hip hop and rapping from them. This activity began from October 31, 2020, to January 2, 2021.
  - Lots of Advice: Seo Jang-hoon and Lee Soo-geun, a duo in Brother School that is well known for their chemistry, get advices on various games, alongside Shindong (Super Junior). This activity began from January 16 to April 17, 2021.

=== Special ===
- Special segment: Knowing Bros Award, An annual year-closing episode, Knowing Bros Awards, started on December 29, 2018. In the episode, the hosts review the corners and the appearances from the guests that were featured in the latest year. Hosts and some special guests are also provided with distinctive awards.

Ep.	Name	Guest(s)
160	End of the Year Special	Norazo
211	End of School Term Ceremony: 2019 Knowing Bros Awards	Oh Na-ra
261	End of School Term Ceremony: 2020 Knowing Bros Awards	Weki Meki, Bibi, Kim Tae-woo, Park Jin-joo, Pengsoo
312	End of School Term Ceremony: 2021 Knowing Bros Awards + Christmas Special	Jung In, Ailee, Jung Dong-won

- Special episodes: These episodes do not follow the Brother School format.

Ep.	Name	Guest(s)
23	Never-ending audition – Knowing Girls	I.O.I
34	Brothers Club VS Sisters Club	Lovelyz
44	Girl Group Laboratory	DIA
51	Duet Project – Universe Cowards	Momo (Twice)
59	Ultimate High School Matchup	Cosmic Girls
71	Promise Fulfillment for achieving 5% ratings	-
107, 108	Question Solving Picnic	Oh My Girl
114, 115	Knowing Bros Music Video Battle	Song Eun-yi, Yoo Se-yoon, Hong Jin-young
187, 188	Brother School First Field Trip	ITZY
253	1st Brother School Girl Group Battle	Lovelyz (Jisoo, Mijoo), GFriend (Eunha, Umji), April (Yoon Chae-kyung, Lee Na-eun), Cosmic Girls (Soobin, Dayoung), Momoland (JooE, Nancy), Weki Meki (Choi Yoo-jung, Kim Do-yeon), (G)I-DLE (Miyeon, Yuqi)
278	Knowing Bros Children's Song Project for Children's Day	Yeo Esther, Highlight
282, 283	Bros High School Dormitory	Defconn, Lee Hye-jung, Aespa
306	Bros High School Festival	Jang Dong-min, Ock Joo-hyun, Tei, Joo Woo-jae, Xiumin (EXO), Seolhyun (AOA), Lee Jang-jun (Golden Child), Dayoung (Cosmic Girls)
317	2022 Bros High School Lunar New Year Sports Competition	2PM (Jun. K, Wooyoung), Monsta X (Minhyuk, Joohoney), Astro (Moonbin, Yoon San-ha), The Boyz (Juyeon, Q), Park Goon, Na Tae-joo
318	2022 Knowing Bros Wrestling Competition	2PM (Jun. K, Wooyoung), Monsta X (Minhyuk, Joohoney), Astro (Moonbin, Yoon San-ha), The Boyz (Juyeon, Q), Park Goon, Na Tae-joo
335	Bros High School Pep Rally	-

=== Previous ===
Name	Ep.	Notes
Ask Us Anything	1–13, 107‍–‍108	In this concept, viewers were able to submit questions, which the cast members would try to answer through any means necessary. The concept briefly returned on episodes 107 & 108 to commemorate the 2nd anniversary of the show.
Mental Victory Battle	14–16	It was a Talk/Game Show. It seemed to have emerged under the judgment that stable format was needed by calling two entertainers candidates who need mental victory and to play a logical confrontation and to select a winner. In one of the segments, they would begin with the "esteem up and down", PD show picture and guest should thumbs up or down then they explain their reason. After listening, host press the button for the person who has a better psych.

== Presenters ==
=== Cast ===
The program's original cast consisted of Kang Ho-dong, Lee Soo-geun, Seo Jang-hoon, Kim Young-chul, Kim Hee-chul, Hwang Chi-yeul and Kim Se-hwang. Min Kyung-hoon was added to the cast formation on the second episode aired on December 12, 2015. Hwang Chi-yeul and Kim Se-hwang left the program after the seventh episode, which aired on January 16, 2016. Lee Sang-min joined the cast on March 5, 2016. Comedian Lee Jin-ho was added as a fixed cast member in episode 304 and he left after episode 454. Comedienne Kim Shin-young was added as a regular member on May 9, 2026.

==== Current cast ====
Name	Nickname(s)	Duration	Notes
Kang Ho-dong 강호동	Brother School Captain (아형고 통) Oldest Brother (옛날 형님, 큰형님); Bat (박쥐); Fat Bat (뚱박); Harley Dong (할리동) [[Tom Cat|Tom (톰)]] Face Genius (얼굴천재) [[Onggi|Crockery (장독대)]] Vocal Genius (음악천재, 음천); Pig (돼지) [[Okja|Okja (옥자)]]	Ep. 1–present	The oldest and strongest member of the cast, who is known for his outdated comedic sense. He is a highly decorated former Ssireum athlete, who managed to receive many awards throughout his professional career. The cast members often tease him for his friendly rivalry as the Nation's MC with Yoo Jae-suk, and the fact that he has the highest appearance fee out of the members due to his seniority in the industry. He is often called out for his poor treatment of guests when he was the MC of Star King. He is also the 'center' of the class because he often sits misaligned to the table, giving the illusion of him being the center from the point of view of the guests and teachers standing at the front. He is also teased for not fixing his Southeastern dialect although Heechul had to fix his Gangwon-do dialect. After he defeated Seo Jang-hoon in the battle of looks in episodes 107–108, he acquired the nickname "Face Genius" (얼굴천재) from Oh My Girl member, Seunghee. By 2022, he was teased for not having a meal with Sakura of IZ*One/Le Sserafim despite him being her first male friend in Korea because they never exchanged contact details. His main theme song is "The Godfather Waltz" by Nino Rota from the film The Godfather; and occasionally a variation of "The Imperial March (Darth Vader's Theme)", usually by Japanese group Kuricorder Quartet.
Lee Soo-geun 이수근	Dwarf Village Chief (소인마을 이장) [[The Smurfs|Smurf (스머프)]] Ace (에이스); God of Improvisation (콩트의 신); Kang Ho-dong's right-hand man (강호동의 오른팔); True Embodiment of Knowing Bros (사실상 아는 형님의 전신); Recreation Manager (오락 부장)	Ep. 1–present	He is known as the right-hand man of Kang Ho-dong and the class clown of the program. He is responsible for reading the Entrance Application of new students. The cast members often tease his previous gambling scandal that caused him to resign from all TV activities for a couple of years. He has also been teased for being cold and distant towards people who had been in other shows with him, a stark contrast to Hodong. He is considered the funniest member due to his blunt and straightforward jokes, and is known for his farting in class. His main theme song is "All In Theme (Orchestra Version)" from the 2003 South Korean drama All In; and occasionally "Public Enemy" (공공의 적) by Jo Yeong-wook from the 2002 South Korean film of the same name, "You Be Illin'" by hip hop group Run-DMC, and "La La Song" by Hoyt Curtin from the animated television series The Smurfs.
Kim Young-chul 김영철	The one whose seat is always taken away (맨날 자리 뺏기는 애) Noisy Brother (시끄러운 형); D.a.n.g Boss (당갑, DANG甲); Least-Funny Icon (노잼의 아이콘); The unfunny one (재미없는 애, 안 웃기는 애); Talent Breaker (개인기 브레이커); Comrade Kim Yong-chol (김영철 동무); Invisible Man (투명인간); Wallflower (병풍); Comedian, Not Canadian	Ep. 1–present	On this show, Kim is in charge of being the awkward and unfunny person in everybody's high school class (despite him being very entertaining in real life). He is also known for his promise to leave the program once it passed the 5% viewership rating (Ep. 68, when he was absent when Hyeri came with Girl's Day). This became a return joke in 2021 because Hyeri never returned to the show for 4 years when she appeared with Rosé of BlackPink in Ep 272. He is the most fluent English speaker, touted as the most fluent English-speaking Korean comedian, despite never studied abroad. His English jokes are considered unfunny however, only because nobody else can fully understand him. Also, he is known as the ugly one, and most of the guests usually pick him as a seat mate they never want to have (Except for twice's Tzuyu, who sat next to him too much) "Gone Not Around Any Longer" (있다 없으니까) by South Korean duo SISTAR19 is occasionally his theme song, in addition to his own songs "Ring Ring" (따르릉) & "Andenayon" (안되나용); his North Korean theme songs include "Greetings" (반갑습니다) by North Korean singer Ri Kyong-suk (리경숙), & "Whistle (North Korean song)" (휘파람) by North Korean singer Jon Hye-yong (전혜영).
Seo Jang-hoon 서장훈	207 centimeter Giant (207CM 거인) Giant/Titan (거인); Symbol of Break-ups (이별의 상징/아이콘, 헤어짐의 아이콘); Epitome of Legal Separation (법적 이별계의 독보저 존재); Seo Ph.D, Break-up Expert (이별 전문 서박사, 이별 서장훈 선생); Honorary Ambassador on Divorce (이혼 홍보대사); Ssamja's Father (쌈자 아비); Landlord (건물주); Worth $600 million (6천억); Fact Bomber (팩트 폭격기); Big Bat (장박); Class President Seo (반장님, 서 반장); Dream Breaker (드림 브레이커); Ex-son-in-law (훈 서방); Chatterbox (수다쟁이); Genius (천재); Seogolas (서골라스) [[Spoon class theory#Spoon classes|Gold spoon class (금수저)]] Settlement Expert (합의 전문가); Pillar (기동); Utility Pole (전봇대); Acting Genius (연기천재) [[Leonardo DiCaprio|Leonardo SeoCaprio (리오나르도 서카프리오)]]	Ep. 1–present	A former center of the Korean Basketball League, he is the tallest member of the cast. Often teased about his height (207 cm, roughly 6 feet 9 inches), wealth (to the point of him being a landlord), high-profile divorce and bad physical health. He was later teased about his germaphobia, in a much more serious case than Heechul, hence nobody else has actually seen any of his properties. He is also known for having close guesses in "Guess About Me", only to be robbed at the last minute. However, when he does get it right, he sometimes walks from the corner to the high-boom camera in the other corner of the room, often performing some sort of celebratory action. he's often teased about his high class lifestyle and the fact he owns many buildings. When he cosplays as a female character, her name is Rose (Ep.4). His main theme song is "The Last Match" (마지막 승부) by South Korean singer Kim Min-gyo, the theme song of the 1994 South Korean drama of the same name; and occasionally "Scars" (상처만) by South Korean singer BOIS from the 2010 South Korean drama Secret Garden, and "Rainism" by South Korean singer Rain.
Kim Hee-chul 김희철	Psycho (돌I, 돌+아이; the actual spelling being an insult as well as a swear word) Psycho Brother (돌I 형); Universe Big Star (우주대스타); TV Maniac (TV 덕후); Mr. Kim Stop-It (김 그만 하라고 씨); Kim Hee-mi (김희미); King of Seriousness (정색왕); Human Jukebox (인간 주크박스); Music Master (가요박사); Music Search Engine (음악 검색기); Impersonation Machine (모창 머신); Kangwon-do Representative (강원도 대표); Knowing Bros/Brother School's Anti-Smoking Honorary Ambassador (아는형님/아형고의 금연 홍보대사); Ace of Jokes (드립 에이스); Zoruzima Master (조르지마 전도사)	Ep. 1–present	The craziest member of the cast, who is known for his blunt and straightforward comments, which he tries to damp down when long-time acquaintances are guests of the program. He is teased for entering the classroom while rubbing his hands and having "magnets" in his leg due to a car accident in 2006. In episode 272 in 2021, his left hip weakness still hasn't improved on a blind marching test. He is also known as the anti-smoking ambassador, who used to smoke during his youth but quit to let others know the harmful effects of smoking, and was the first of the group to do so (He and Kang Ho Dong have quit smoking and Kim Young-Chul is a non-smoker). He becomes a transfer student (guest) when he is promoting with Super Junior. He was also teased for his relationship with Momo of Twice from 2020 to 2021. He is well versed in Korean TV and entertainment history and has beaten Key of Shinee in terms of knowledge of girl group songs. However: Unlike Hodong and Janghoon, has no interest or knowledge in sports. His main theme songs are "Sorry, Sorry" and "Mr. Simple", both by his group Super Junior.
Min Kyung-hoon 민경훈	Ssamja (쌈자) Min Ssamja (민쌈자); Ssamgu (쌈구); Youngest Brother (막내); 4D Brother (4차원 동생); Pervert (음란, 음란마귀); Trash (쓰레기, 쓰레기통) [[Jerry Mouse|Jerry (제리)]] Slug (민달팽이); Kang Ho-dong Sniper (강호동 저격수); Homebody (집순이); Limbo King (림경훈); Bad Acting Boss (발연기甲)	Ep. 2–present	The youngest member of the cast. He is sometimes referred to as Janghoon's son and is known for his mature comments and risqué thoughts. His rebellious attitude toward Kang Ho-dong, the oldest member of the show, has garnered much public interest. He is the vocalist of rock band Buzz and is often teased for his head voice and exaggerated use of vibrato. Known to be both the worst dancer among the brothers for his lack of bodily rhythm and the least knowledgeable when it comes to names in the entertainment business. It is an ongoing joke that a celebrity is only really famous if Kyung-hoon knows who he/she is. Many celebrities, specifically idols, therefore ask him if he knows who they are. He is also the most agile of the members because he has trained in martial arts since elementary school. Another running gag in the show is when Kyung-hoon sees an actress or idol he loves, his facial hairs begin to show, or his ears turn red, as well as a dimple. Another running gag is his use of poop jokes, which he uses when he runs out of answers to a question. His main theme songs are from his group Buzz, usually "Thorn" (가시), "Coward" (겁쟁이), & "Reds Go Together"; and occasionally "Careless Whisper" by George Michael, and "Sweet Dream" (나비잠) by both Kyung-hoon and Hee-chul. On August 28, 2026, it was announced that he would take a temporary hiatus. JTBC stated that the hiatus was not a departure from the program, while his agency said that he would return after taking time to rest.
Lee Sang-min 이상민	The sad one (안쓰러운 애) God of Music (음악의 신); Debtor (채무자, 빚쟁이) [[Good Wife, Wise Mother|Good Wife, Wise Mother (현모양처)]] Kang Ho-dong's left-hand man (강호동의 왼팔); Roo'ra's Honorary Ambassador (룰라 홍보대사); Bachelor (총각)	Ep. 15–present (regular); Ep. 14 (guest)	He is often teased for his divorced status and infamously huge financial debt. Due to this, he frequently gives honest advice towards young idol singers. He was a successful songwriter and record producer, specializing mostly in hip-hop and dance music, and he did have a muscular body because he managed to lose 22 kg. His nickname was given by Lee Soo-geun, which is an abbreviation of "his current situation is miserable", a reference to him being in debt (현재 모양이 처량하다; hyeonjae moyangi cheoryanghada). In 2018, after he finally paid off his most of his debts, he was able to apply for a low-limit credit card for the first time in 13 years, and bought Iced Americano for the other members, as his credit rating went from Grade 10 (the worst) to Grade 6. He usually asks rich idols for money to pay off his debt. In 2021, he became a hip health ambassador, after discovering that Heechul's left hip is still weak after the car accident in 2006, and Min kyung-hoon's right hip is poor due to his tendency to use his left leg as a plant leg when performing martial arts kicks. Since Lee Sang-min and Seo Jang-hoon are both divorced and live alone, they also aren't used to sharing things with others. His main theme song is the ending song of the South Korean documentary program Screening Humanity; and occasionally "1997 Spring" from the 2001 Japanese film Calmi Cuori Appassionati, as well as "The Last Waltz" from the 2003 South Korean film Oldboy.
Shindong (Super Junior) 신동		Ep. 444–present (regular); Ep. 62-443 (recurring guest)	Singer, MC and Radio Personality. He began appearing as a recurring guest hosting the second part of the show with segments that involved playing games with the guests. He was added as a regular member in episode 444.
Kim Shin-young 김신영		Ep. 528–present (regular); Ep. 33, 130, 154, 201, 280, 332, 413, 519, 525, 527 (guest)	Comedienne and member of project group Celeb Five. She was added as a regular member in episode 528.

==== Former cast ====
Name	Nickname(s)	Duration	Notes
Hwang Chi-yeul	Kang Ho-dong's rising right-hand man (강호동의 신흥 오른팔)	Ep. 1–6 (regular); Ep. 32, 80 (guest)	He is a solo Singer and TV host. Originally Ho-dong's favorite and right man who never got scolded by Ho-dong, he leaves to study abroad in China, but returns for a cameo in episode 6, appearing as the 8th member. He appears again as a guest in episodes 32 and 80, passing the mantle of right-hand man to Soo-geun
Kim Se-hwang	Folding screen (병풍)	Ep. 1–7	He is the lead guitarist of rock band N.EX.T. The show's production team referred to him as "one of the three biggest guitarists in Asia" during one episode. It was his debut performance in an entertainment show.
Lee Jin-ho 이진호	WikiJinho (Wiki진호) Is that the best? (최선이 다 입니까?)	Ep. 304‍–‍454	He is a comedian and a rising star in variety shows. He left after his voluntary confession of illegal online gambling and the resulting debt.

==== Special Cast ====
Name	# Ep.	Episodes	Occupation
Jang Sung-kyu	66	11, 23, 33, 42, 44, 46, 53, 57, 59, 61, 66, 73, 74, 76, 77, 81, 82, 85, 90, 94‍–‍96, 98, 100, 106, 110‍–‍112, 114, 128, 130, 136, 138, 141‍–‍142, 144‍–‍145, 147, 149, 152‍–‍153, 155‍–‍156, 160, 162‍–‍163, 165, 167, 169‍–‍171, 173, 180, 193, 198, 208‍–‍219, 261	Television personality and host (Note: Although being named as a guest, he often wishes to become a regular member. He is often cast as a teacher with an extravagant style.)
Kim Hwan	20	185, 192, 199‍–‍200, 499, 510, 517‍–‍518, 522‍–‍523, 525‍–‍534	Announcer
Jeong Se-woon	11	208‍–‍210, 212‍–‍219	Singer

== List of episodes ==
Series overview

Year	Episodes	Originally aired	
Year	Episodes	First aired	Last aired
2015	4	December 5, 2015	December 26, 2015
2016	52	January 2, 2016	December 24, 2016
2017	52	January 7, 2017	December 30, 2017
2018	52	January 6, 2018	December 29, 2018
2019	51	January 5, 2019	December 28, 2019
2020	50	January 4, 2020	December 26, 2020
2021	51	January 2, 2021	December 25, 2021
2022	52	January 1, 2022	December 31, 2022
2023	50	January 7, 2023	December 23, 2023
2024	49	January 6, 2024	December 28, 2024
2025	48	January 11, 2025	December 13, 2025
2026	TBA	January 3, 2026	TBA

== Ratings ==
- Note that the show airs on a cable channel (pay TV), which plays part in its slower uptake and relatively small audience share when compared to programs broadcast (FTA) on public networks such as KBS, SBS, MBC or EBS.
- NR rating means "not reported". The rating is low.
- TNmS have stopped publishing their rating report from June 2018.
- In the ratings below, the highest rating for the show will be in red, and the lowest rating for the show will be in blue each year.
List of ratings in 2015 (episode 1–4)

Ep. #	Broadcast date	Average audience share		
Ep. #	Broadcast date	AGB Nielsen		TNmS Ratings
Ep. #	Broadcast date	Nationwide	Seoul Capital Area	Nationwide
1	December 5	1.809%	NR	1.7%
2	December 12	1.140%	NR	1.0%
3	December 19	1.548%	NR	1.2%
4	December 26	1.405%	NR	1.1%

List of ratings in 2016 (episode 5–56)

Ep. #	Broadcast date	Average audience share		
Ep. #	Broadcast date	AGB Nielsen		TNmS Ratings
Ep. #	Broadcast date	Nationwide	Seoul Capital Area	Nationwide
5	January 2	1.169%	NR	0.7%
6	January 9	1.149%	NR	0.9%
7	January 16	1.359%	NR	1.2%
8	January 23	1.915%	NR	1.6%
9	January 30	1.344%	NR	1.2%
10	February 6	1.708%	NR	1.2%
11	February 13	1.855%	NR	1.4%
12	February 20	1.601%	NR	1.6%
13	February 27	1.717%	NR	1.7%
14	March 5	1.432%	NR	1.2%
15	March 12	1.477%	NR	1.1%
16	March 19	1.542%	NR	1.4%
17	March 26	1.679%	NR	1.6%
18	April 2	1.518%	NR	1.3%
19	April 9	1.474%	NR	1.3%
20	April 16	1.155%	NR	1.6%
21	April 23	1.327%	NR	2.2 509%
22	April 30	1.632%	NR	1.7%
23	May 7	2.209%	2.579%	1.9%
24	May 14	1.899%	2.172%	2.4%
25	May 21	1.917%	NR	2.500%
26	May 28	1.927%	NR	2.0%
27	June 4	2.656%	2.788%	2.3%
28	June 11	1.952%	NR	2.1%
29	June 18	2.152%	NR	5.3%
30	June 25	2.909%	3.366%	2.6%
31	July 2	3.064%	3.425%	2.5%
32	July 9	3.090%	3.353%	2.6%
33	July 16	3.728%	4.605%	3.2%
34	July 23	2.368%	2.725%	2.2%
35	July 30	3.399%	3.807%	3.1%
36	August 6	2.830%	2.989%	3.5%
37	August 13	3.099%	3.226%	3.5%
38	August 20	2.991%	3.599%	2.8%
39	August 27	2.434%	NR	3.0%
40	September 3	2.890%	3.265%	3.5%
41	September 10	2.971%	3.315%	3.4%
42	September 17	2.375%	NR	2.8%
43	September 24	2.597%	2.758%	3.1%
44	October 1	2.249%	2.201%	2.7%
45	October 8	3.879%	4.085%	4.3%
46	October 15	2.967%	2.956%	3.7%
47	October 22	3.107%	3.243%	3.6%
48	October 29	3.509%	3.298%	3.5%
49	November 5	3.338%	3.864%	4.5%
50	November 12	3.624%	NR	4.3%
51	November 19	2.178%	NR	2.6%
52	November 26	2.960%	NR	4.2%
53	December 3	3.453%	3.598%	4.3%
54	December 10	3.242%	3.311%	3.7%
55	December 17	3.779%	4.004%	4.0%
56	December 24	2.870%	NR	3.6%

List of ratings in 2017 (episode 57–108)

Ep. #	Broadcast date	Average audience share		
Ep. #	Broadcast date	AGB Nielsen		TNmS Ratings
Ep. #	Broadcast date	Nationwide	Seoul Capital Area	Nationwide
57	January 7	4.153%	4.341%	3.9%
58	January 14	4.800%	4.931%	6.1%
59	January 21	3.034%	2.824%	4.0%
60	January 28	3.349%	3.151%	3.5%
61	February 4	3.877%	4.114%	3.8%
62	February 11	4.246%	4.095%	4.4%
63	February 18	4.172%	3.805%	4.2%
64	February 25	3.921%	4.359%	4.1%
65	March 4	4.195%	3.956%	4.7%
66	March 11	5.333%	5.289%	5.6%
67	March 18	4.102%	3.585%	5.7%
68	March 25	4.435%	4.322%	5.8%
69	April 1	5.609%	5.597%	6.1%
70	April 8	4.328%	3.981%	5.2%
71	April 15	4.453%	3.495%	5.7%
72	April 22	5.915%	5.557%	6.1%
73	April 29	5.280%	5.442%	5.6%
74	May 6	5.307%	5.247%	6.1%
75	May 13	6.990%	7.659%	7.6%
76	May 20	4.832%	4.564%	5.4%
77	May 27	4.901%	5.331%	5.0%
78	June 3	4.303%	4.051%	5.9%
79	June 10	5.188%	5.238%	5.1%
80	June 17	4.150%	3.774%	4.9%
81	June 24	5.449%	5.456%	5.6%
82	July 1	4.618%	5.065%	5.4%
83	July 8	4.605%	4.511%	5.7%
84	July 15	4.414%	4.851%	5.6%
85	July 22	4.466%	4.399%	6.0%
86	July 29	5.218%	4.879%	5.5%
87	August 5	4.693%	4.285%	5.8%
88	August 12	6.071%	5.832%	6.7%
89	August 19	4.905%	4.567%	5.2%
90	August 26	5.065%	4.949%	5.9%
91	September 2	5.282%	5.438%	5.9%
92	September 9	4.654%	4.831%	5.4%
93	September 16	4.040%	4.089%	4.3%
94	September 23	4.414%	4.001%	5.2%
95	September 30	5.088%	4.924%	5.2%
96	October 7	4.824%	4.600%	4.7%
97	October 14	4.456%	4.608%	4.8%
98	October 21	5.688%	5.370%	6.6%
99	October 28	5.573%	6.009%	6.4%
100	November 4	5.383%	5.438%	6.4%
101	November 11	6.106%	5.935%	7.7%
102	November 18	6.498%	6.359%	6.7%
103	November 25	5.259%	5.392%	7.1%
104	December 2	5.933%	6.244%	6.8%
105	December 9	6.059%	6.059%	5.7%
106	December 16	5.689%	5.351%	6.7%
107	December 23	5.379%	5.289%	4.7%
108	December 30	4.082%	4.251%	4.3%

List of ratings in 2018 (episode 109–160)

Ep. #	Broadcast date	Average audience share		
Ep. #	Broadcast date	AGB Nielsen		TNmS Ratings
Ep. #	Broadcast date	Nationwide	Seoul Capital Area	Nationwide
109	January 6	6.278%	6.490%	6.1%
110	January 13	5.572%	5.333%	6.1%
111	January 20	5.510%	5.922%	5.4%
112	January 27	5.822%	5.832%	6.8%
113	February 3	4.909%	5.159%	5.5%
114	February 10	3.670%	3.819%	3.6%
115	February 17	2.851%	2.570%	3.5%
116	February 24	2.711%	2.911%	2.5%
117	March 3	4.630%	4.748%	6.2%
118	March 10	5.658%	6.078%	5.8%
119	March 17	4.246%	4.266%	4.7%
120	March 24	5.566%	5.942%	6.3%
121	March 31	5.354%	5.648%	6.4%
122	April 7	5.306%	5.330%	5.6%
123	April 14	6.105%	6.794%	7.2%
124	April 21	6.224%	6.653%	6.5%
125	April 28	4.619%	4.939%	5.8%
126	May 5	4.981%	5.090%	5.9%
127	May 12	5.434%	5.866%	6.1%
128	May 19	5.449%	6.117%	5.9%
129	May 26	6.158%	6.747%	6.0%
130	June 2	5.204%	4.712%	NR
131	June 9	5.648%	5.858%	NR
132	June 16	4.571%	5.217%	NR
133	June 23	5.961%	6.170%	NR
134	June 30	5.710%	5.097%	NR
135	July 7	5.145%	5.649%	NR
136	July 14	4.496%	4.758%	NR
137	July 21	4.237%	4.107%	NR
138	July 28	4.670%	4.545%	NR
139	August 4	4.602%	4.415%	NR
140	August 11	5.135%	5.373%	NR
141	August 18	4.527%	4.719%	NR
142	August 25	4.995%	5.163%	NR
143	September 1	2.092%	1.892%	NR
144	September 8	4.179%	4.150%	NR
145	September 15	3.620%	3.559%	NR
146	September 22	5.786%	5.212%	NR
147	September 29	4.703%	4.352%	NR
148	October 6	5.510%	5.594%	NR
149	October 13	5.499%	5.896%	NR
150	October 20	6.376%	6.860%	NR
151	October 27	5.934%	6.444%	NR
152	November 3	5.928%	6.315%	NR
153	November 10	5.614%	6.420%	NR
154	November 17	6.473%	6.920%	NR
155	November 24	5.974%	5.968%	NR
156	December 1	4.381%	4.124%	NR
157	December 8	5.207%	4.966%	NR
158	December 15	4.952%	5.326%	NR
159	December 22	5.086%	5.295%	NR
160	December 29	4.202%	4.047%	NR

List of ratings in 2019 (episode 161–211)

Ep. #	Broadcast date	Average audience share	
Ep. #	Broadcast date	AGB Nielsen	
Ep. #	Broadcast date	Nationwide	Seoul Capital Area
161	January 5	6.679%	6.908%
162	January 12	6.441%	6.196%
163	January 19	6.257%	6.498%
164	January 26	6.767%	7.009%
165	February 2	6.127%	5.991%
166	February 9	9.585%	10.551%
167	February 16	6.047%	6.322%
168	February 23	6.541%	6.776%
169	March 2	5.399%	5.745%
170	March 9	5.096%	5.258%
171	March 16	5.688%	6.049%
172	March 23	5.756%	6.395%
173	March 30	4.903%	5.179%
174	April 6	4.151%	4.302%
175	April 13	5.056%	5.222%
176	April 20	3.924%	4.163%
177	April 27	4.428%	4.883%
178	May 4	4.405%	4.108%
179	May 11	5.846%	6.624%
180	May 18	4.676%	4.735%
181	May 25	5.224%	5.520%
182	June 1	5.532%	6.051%
183	June 8	5.972%	6.445%
184	June 15	5.279%	5.308%
185	June 22	6.675%	6.608%
186	June 29	7.231%	7.599%
187	July 6	5.804%	5.750%
188	July 13	4.308%	4.742%
189	July 20	5.735%	5.791%
190	July 27	5.696%	6.064%
191	August 3	4.580%	4.888%
192	August 10	3.726%	3.727%
193	August 17	4.332%	4.390%
194	August 24	5.072%	5.525%
195	August 31	3.973%	3.962%
196	September 7	4.413%	5.084%
197	September 21	5.517%	5.611%
198	September 28	4.942%	4.775%
199	October 5	4.770%	4.579%
200	October 12	5.115%	5.034%
201	October 19	5.399%	5.750%
202	October 26	4.824%	5.149%
203	November 2	6.349%	6.835%
204	November 9	4.135%	4.099%
205	November 16	5.729%	5.601%
206	November 23	3.533%	3.383%
207	November 30	6.929%	6.962%
208	December 7	4.994%	5.318%
209	December 14	4.556%	4.277%
210	December 21	4.992%	5.146%
211	December 28	4.068%	3.856%

List of ratings in 2020 (episode 212–261)

Ep. #	Broadcast date	Average audience share	
Ep. #	Broadcast date	AGB Nielsen	
Ep. #	Broadcast date	Nationwide	Seoul Capital Area
212	January 4	5.866%	5.695%
213	January 11	4.536%	4.558%
214	January 18	4.251%	3.732%
215	February 1	3.266%	2.984%
216	February 8	3.721%	3.705%
217	February 15	3.910%	3.314%
218	February 22	5.015%	4.873%
219	February 29	6.817%	6.793%
220	March 7	6.252%	6.120%
221	March 14	5.555%	5.670%
222	March 21	6.167%	6.324%
223	March 28	5.905%	5.555%
224	April 4	5.982%	6.152%
225	April 11	8.371%	7.753%
226	April 18	6.064%	5.766%
227	April 25	5.008%	4.919%
228	May 2	7.925%	7.355%
229	May 9	15.523%	14.005%
230	May 16	15.267%	14.392%
231	May 23	14.711%	13.309%
232	May 30	6.082%	6.175%
233	June 6	6.509%	6.928%
234	June 13	6.415%	6.403%
235	June 20	5.019%	4.917%
236	June 27	4.992%	4.927%
237	July 4	5.225%	5.499%
238	July 11	3.934%	3.915%
239	July 18	6.453%	6.184%
240	July 25	5.287%	5.335%
241	August 1	6.537%	6.419%
242	August 8	5.521%	5.234%
243	August 15	4.800%	4.637%
244	August 22	7.200%	7.402%
245	August 29	4.042%	4.065%
246	September 5	5.197%	5.362%
247	September 12	4.656%	4.173%
248	September 19	6.218%	6.473%
249	September 26	5.597%	5.745%
250	October 10	5.534%	5.164%
251	October 17	4.769%	5.154%
252	October 24	3.119%	3.315%
253	October 31	3.696%	3.571%
254	November 7	5.244%	5.424%
255	November 14	4.974%	5.304%
256	November 21	4.506%	4.544%
257	November 28	4.519%	4.611%
258	December 5	4.718%	5.178%
259	December 12	4.624%	4.543%
260	December 19	4.173%	4.054%
261	December 26	4.219%	4.422%

List of ratings in 2021 (episode 262–312)

Ep. #	Broadcast date	Average audience share	
Ep. #	Broadcast date	AGB Nielsen	
Ep. #	Broadcast date	Nationwide	Seoul Capital Area
262	January 2	7.175%	7.442%
263	January 9	5.668%	5.862%
264	January 16	4.199%	4.294%
265	January 23	4.058%	4.335%
266	January 30	4.481%	5.125%
267	February 6	4.513%	4.642%
268	February 20	3.008%	3.055%
269	February 27	4.609%	5.265%
270	March 6	4.389%	4.146%
271	March 13	3.664%	3.691%
272	March 20	3.661%	3.594%
273	March 27	5.322%	4.635%
274	April 3	3.772%	3.319%
275	April 10	4.880%	4.453%
276	April 17	4.108%	4.250%
277	April 24	2.966%	2.869%
278	May 1	2.411%	NR
279	May 8	3.283%	3.056%
280	May 15	3.691%	3.477%
281	May 22	3.925%	4.292%
282	May 29	3.006%	3.288%
283	June 5	2.497%	2.423%
284	June 12	3.702%	4.183%
285	June 19	3.399%	3.567%
286	June 26	3.448%	3.140%
287	July 3	4.338%	4.473%
288	July 10	3.915%	3.664%
289	July 17	4.175%	4.295%
290	July 24	3.593%	3.672%
291	July 31	3.586%	3.428%
292	August 7	3.661%	3.971%
293	August 14	6.578%	7.086%
294	August 21	5.644%	6.306%
295	August 28	3.990%	3.964%
296	September 4	3.589%	3.348%
297	September 11	1.949%	NR
298	September 18	2.046%	2.235%
299	September 25	2.647%	2.767%
300	October 2	2.976%	2.519%
301	October 9	2.586%	2.677%
302	October 16	2.531%	2.588%
303	October 23	1.943%	NR
304	October 30	2.384%	2.351%
305	November 6	2.305%	2.410%
306	November 13	2.302%	2.182%
307	November 20	3.540%	3.852%
308	November 27	2.788%	3.005%
309	December 4	3.000%	3.040%
310	December 11	3.815%	3.758%
311	December 18	2.255%	NR
312	December 25	2.809%	2.703%

List of ratings in 2022 (episode 313–364)

Ep. #	Broadcast date	Average audience share	
Ep. #	Broadcast date	AGB Nielsen	
Ep. #	Broadcast date	Nationwide	Seoul Capital Area
313	January 1	3.417%	3.291%
314	January 8	3.454%	2.921%
315	January 15	3.905%	4.036%
316	January 22	3.069%	2.784%
317	January 29	3.502%	3.257%
318	February 5	3.818%	3.378%
319	February 12	4.046%	3.739%
320	February 19	5.181%	5.511%
321	February 26	2.164%	NR
322	March 5	4.260%	4.526%
323	March 12	1.983%	NR
324	March 19	3.235%	3.182%
325	March 25	2.322%	NR
326	April 2	2.467%	2.549%
327	April 9	3.302%	3.483%
328	April 16	3.181%	2.957%
329	April 23	3.333%	2.910%
330	April 30	3.475%	3.666%
331	May 7	2.235%	2.141%
332	May 14	1.979%	2.033%
333	May 21	2.356%	2.352%
334	May 28	1.983%	2.245%
335	June 4	2.356%	2.270%
336	June 11	2.312%	2.421%
337	June 18	3.114%	3.223%
338	June 25	2.351%	2.146%
339	July 2	2.642%	2.826%
340	July 9	3.053%	3.364%
341	July 16	2.550%	2.579%
342	July 23	2.978%	3.003%
343	July 30	3.626%	3.685%
344	August 6	2.300%	2.483%
345	August 13	3.451%	3.126%
346	August 20	3.425%	3.424%
347	August 27	2.419%	2.428%
348	September 3	2.984%	2.984%
349	September 10	2.302%	2.161%
350	September 17	2.314%	2.422%
351	September 24	3.092%	3.386%
352	October 1	2.620%	2.706%
353	October 8	2.435%	2.756%
354	October 15	2.697%	3.112%
355	October 22	2.845%	2.628%
356	October 29	2.405%	2.653%
357	November 12	2.147%	2.478%
358	November 19	3.014%	3.146%
359	November 26	2.868%	2.974%
360	December 3	2.599%	2.768%
361	December 10	3.161%	3.489%
362	December 17	2.937%	2.776%
363	December 24	3.961%	4.259%
364	December 31	1.890%	NR

List of ratings in 2023 (episode 365–414)

Ep. #	Broadcast date	Average audience share	
Ep. #	Broadcast date	AGB Nielsen	
Ep. #	Broadcast date	Nationwide	Seoul Capital Area
365	January 7	4.218%	3.816%
366	January 14	3.541%	3.555%
367	January 21	3.332%	3.172%
368	January 28	3.008%	3.161%
369	February 4	3.712%	3.777%
370	February 11	2.822%	2.452%
371	February 18	2.425%	2.289%
372	February 25	2.825%	2.963%
373	March 4	3.234%	3.048%
374	March 11	2.940%	3.437%
375	March 18	2.573%	2.812%
376	March 25	2.773%	2.867%
377	April 1	2.126%	NR
378	April 8	2.802%	NR
379	April 15	2.09%	NR
380	April 22	2.452%	NR
381	April 29	2.800%	NR
382	May 6	3.817%	NR
383	May 13	3.774%	NR
384	May 20	2.481%	NR
385	May 27	3.383%	NR
386	June 3	2.338%	NR
387	June 10	2.262%	NR
388	June 17	3.138%	NR
389	June 24	2.561%	NR
390	July 1	3.083%	NR
391	July 8	2.834%	NR
392	July 15	3.212%	NR
393	July 22	4.476%	NR
394	July 29	2.300%	NR
395	August 5	2.095%	NR
396	August 12	1.873%	NR
397	August 19	1.861%	NR
398	August 26	2.524%	NR
399	September 2	2.475%	NR
400	September 9	2.262%	NR
401	September 16	3.269%	NR
402	September 23	1.996%	NR
403	September 30	2.741%	NR
404	October 14	3.204%	NR
405	October 21	2.378%	NR
406	October 28	3.101%	NR
407	November 4	2.571%	NR
408	November 11	2.666%	NR
409	November 18	2.079%	NR
410	November 25	1.634%	NR
411	December 2	1.605%	NR
412	December 9	2.799%	NR
413	December 16	3.179%	NR
414	December 23	2.056%	NR

== Other works ==
=== Discography ===
Year	Title	Peak chart pos.		Sales	Album details
Year	Title	KOR Gaon	KOR Hot	Sales	Album details
2016	"Sweet Dream" (Kim Hee-chul, Min Kyung-hoon)	1	*	KOR: 938,837+	Album: SM Station Season 1; Released: November 19, 2016; Label: SM Entertainment, KT Music; Format: CD, Digital download
2018	"Falling Blossoms" (Kim Hee-chul, Min Kyung-hoon)	15	14	—N/a	Released: February 17, 2018; Label: CJ E&M Music; Format: Digital download
2018	"Andenayon" (Kim Young-chul, feat. Wheesung)	85	74	—N/a	Released: February 17, 2018; Label: Mystic Entertainment, LOEN Entertainment; Format: Digital download
2018	"I Kicked My Luck Off" (Kang Ho-dong, Prod. Hong Jin-young)	100	88	—N/a	Album: SM Station Season 2; Released: February 17, 2018; Label: SM Entertainment, IRIVER; Format: Digital download
2020	"Hanryang" (Kim Hee-chul, Min Kyung-hoon, feat. BIBI, Prod. DinDin)	190	72	—N/a	Released: December 20, 2020; Label: Stone Music Entertainment; Format: Digital download
2021	"SsakSsakYi" (Knowing Bros Casts)	—	—	—N/a	Album: Knowing Brother's Children's Song Project; Released: May 8, 2021; Label: YG Plus; Format: Digital download
2021	"Don't Get Sick" (Highlight, Kim Yu-joo, Prod. Lee Soo-geun)	—	—	—N/a	Album: Knowing Brother's Children's Song Project; Released: May 8, 2021; Label: YG Plus; Format: Digital download
"—" denotes releases that did not chart or were not released in that region. "*" denotes the chart did not exist at that time. Gaon Chart no longer releases download sales figures from January 2018 onwards.

==== Other appearances ====
Song	Year	Person
"Knowing Bros School Song"	2017	Knowing Bros Casts

=== Other Show appearances ===
Years	Title	Network	Member(s)	Notes	Ref
2016	Fantastic Duo	SBS TV	All	Season 1, special appearances via video in episode 16	
2017	My Little Old Boy	SBS TV	All (except Kang Ho-dong)	Cameo in episode 50	
2020	Two Yoo Project Sugar Man	JTBC	All	Season 3, special appearances via video in episode 6	

=== YouTube ===
They started their YouTube channel called "아는형님 Knowingbros" on October 10, 2020.

== Controversy ==
=== Disciplinary action ===
In December 2016, the program received a disciplinary action from South Korea's Broadcast Censorship Committee for using improper remarks, which included objectifying female guests on multiple occasions. In one episode, Min Kyung-hoon gives a handcrafted bra to a female guest (Jeon So-min). The committee also highlighted the use of improper language between cast members and the use of homophobic remarks. Besides a warning given by the committee, it is reported that the program has also received numerous complaints from viewers regarding the matter.

== Awards and nominations ==
Name of the award ceremony, year presented, category, nominee(s) of the award, and the result of the nomination
Award ceremony	Year	Category	Nominee(s)/work(s)	Result	Ref.
Asian Television Awards	2019	Best Comedy Program	Knowing Bros	Won	
Baeksang Arts Awards	2017	Best Entertainment Program	Knowing Bros	Nominated	
Baeksang Arts Awards	2018	Best Variety Performer – Male	Seo Jang-hoon	Won	
Baeksang Arts Awards	2018	Best Variety Performer – Male	Lee Sang-min	Nominated	
Baeksang Arts Awards	2020	Best Variety Performer – Male	Kim Hee-chul	Nominated	
Brand Customer Loyalty Awards	2020	Program – Talk Variety	Knowing Bros	Won	
Gaon Chart Music Awards	2017	Song of the Year (November)	"Sweet Dream"	Nominated	
Gaon Chart Music Awards	2019	Song of the Year (February)	"Falling Blossoms"	Nominated	
JTBC Awards (Note: Determined through viewers votes)	2016	Best Entertainer	Kang Ho-dong	Nominated	
JTBC Awards	2016	Best Entertainer	Lee Soo-geun	Nominated	
JTBC Awards	2016	Best Entertainer	Kim Hee-chul	Won	
JTBC Awards	2016	Best Couple Award	Kim Hee-chul & Min Kyung-hoon	Won	
JTBC Awards	2016	Best Couple Award	Kang Ho-dong & Lee Soo-geun	Nominated	
JTBC Awards	2016	Best Producer Award	Choi Chang-soo	Won	
JTBC Awards	2016	Top 3 Program	Knowing Bros	2nd	
Korea First Brand Awards	2017	Korea's Brand of the Year	Knowing Bros	Won	
Melon Music Awards	2017	Best Rock Song	"Sweet Dream"	Won	
Melon Music Awards	2018	Best Rock Song	"Falling Blossoms"	Won	
Melon Music Awards	2018	Best Trot Song	"Andenayon"	Nominated	
Melon Music Awards	2018	Best Trot Song	"I Kicked My Luck Off"	Nominated	
