= Sweet Dream (Universe Cowards song) =

Single by Universe Cowards (Kim Hee-chul & Min Kyung-hoon)

from the album SM Station Season 1
- Released: November 20, 2016
- Genre: Rock
- Length: 4:35
- Label: SM; Genie
- Composers: Lee Sang-jun; Cha Gil-wan
- Lyricist: Kim Hee-chul
- Producer: Cha Gil-wan

Universe Cowards singles chronology
"Sweet Dream" (2016)	"Falling Blossoms" (2018)

Music video
- "Sweet Dream" on YouTube

"Sweet Dream" (Korean: 나비잠; RR: Nabijam) is a song by South Korean artists Kim Hee-chul and Min Kyung-hoon, the two stars who are known as Universe Cowards (우주겁쟁이). Their stage name is a mix of Heechul's nickname "Universe Star" and Buzz's song "Coward".

== Background and release ==
"Sweet Dream" was released digitally by SM Entertainment on November 20, 2016. The song is a part of SM Station and is a collaboration single for the variety show Knowing Bros.

== Reception ==
The song proved successful, topping the South Korean Gaon Digital Chart, an achievement known as "all-kill".

== Music video ==
The music video portrays Kim as a high school student who has a crush on Momo Hirai but she only has eyes for his best friend, who is played by Min. The cast of Knowing Bros then come in and kidnap Momo, forcing Heechul and Kyung-hoon to learn martial arts from a master, who is played by Lee Soo-geun. They successfully defeat the gang members, with the help of Momo, who bashes the gang leader's head with a pot. When Kim rushes and hugs Momo, Momo hugs a puzzled Min instead, leaving Kim in distraught. It is revealed that all the events are Kim's own dream, as Momo appeared in Kim and Min's classroom and introduces herself. At the end of the video, it is shown that Min had been harboring feelings for Kim instead, evidenced by Min's writing on his table. The music video presents LGBT issues to viewers in a lighthearted manner.

== Track listing ==
No.	Title	Lyrics	Music	Arrangement	Length
1.	"Sweet Dream"	Kim Hee-chul	Lee Sang-jun, Cha Gil-wan	Cha Gil-wan	4:35
2.	"Sweet Dream (Inst.)"		Lee Sang-jun, Cha Gil-wan	Cha Gil-wan	4:35
Total length:					9:10

== Charts and sales ==
Peak chart positions	Sales (DL)
KOR Gaon	Sales (DL)
1	KOR: 938,837+

== Accolades ==
Year	Award	Category	Result	Ref.
2017	6th Gaon Chart Music Awards	Song of the Year (November)	Nominated	
2017	9th Melon Music Awards	Best Rock Song	Won	

== See also ==
- List of Gaon Digital Chart number ones of 2016
