= Soo-geun =

- Hangul: 수근
- RR: Sugeun
- MR: Sugŭn

Soo-geun, also spelled Swoo-geun, is a Korean given name.

People with this name include:

- Park Su-geun (1914–1965), South Korean painter
- Kim Swoo-geun (1931–1986), South Korean architect
- Lee Soo-geun (born 1975), South Korean comedian
- Jung Soo-keun (born 1977), South Korean baseball player

== See also ==
- List of Korean given names
