= Min Kyung-hoon =

South Korean singer and entertainer

- 민경훈
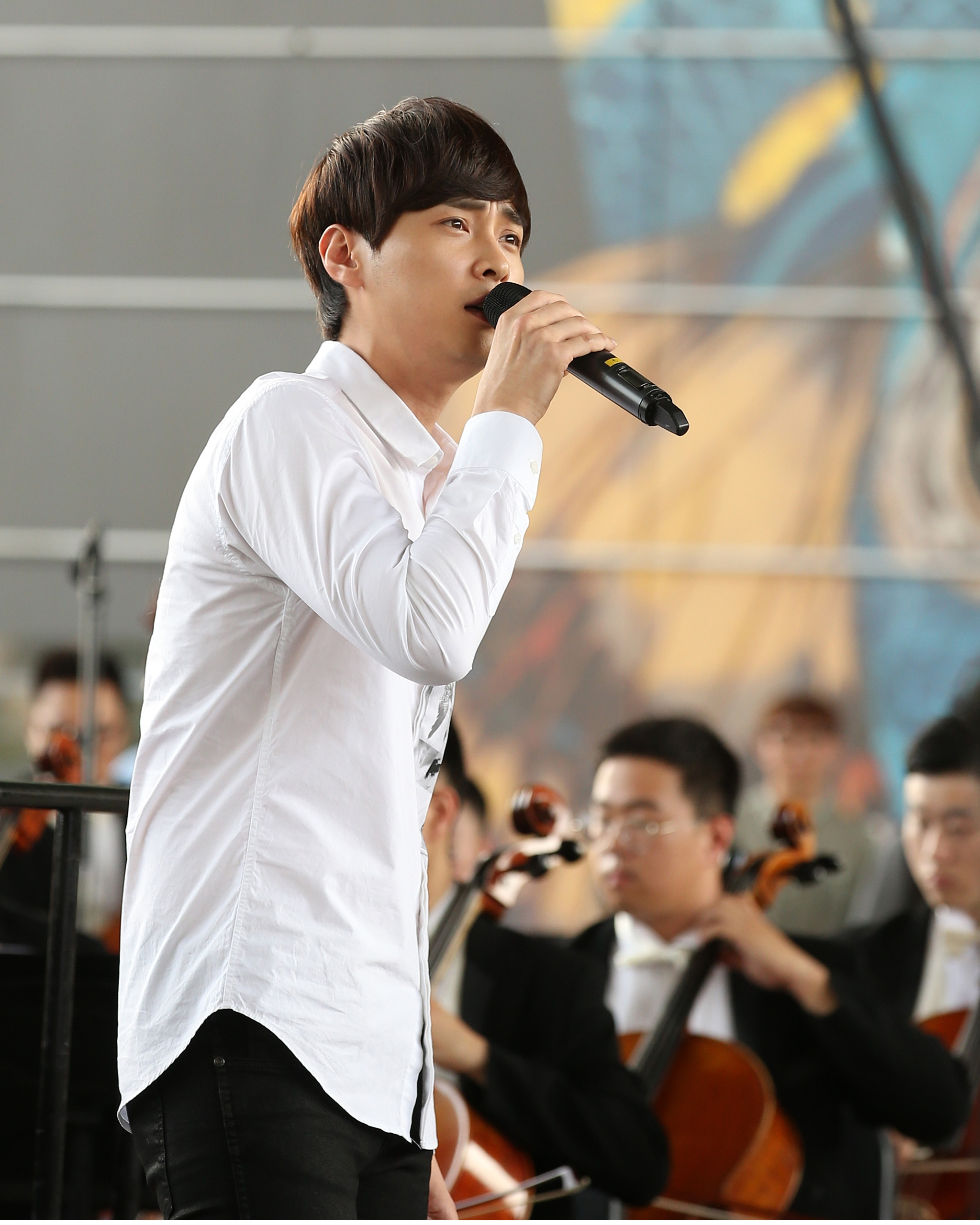
- National Museum of Korea "Cultural Event" in 2015
- Born: October 6, 1984 (age 41); Seoul, South Korea
- Occupations: Singer; Entertainer; Lyricist
- Spouse: Shin Ki-eun (m. 2024)
- Musical career
- Genres: Ballad; Pop rock
- Instrument: Vocals
- Years active: 2003–present
- Label: Long Play Music (formerly Santa Music)
- Member of: Buzz

YouTube information
- Channel: 민경훈 TV
- Subscribers: 95.5 thousand
- Views: 5.29 million
- Last updated: 18 January 2024

Korean name
- Hangul: 민경훈
- Hanja: 閔庚勳
- RR: Min Gyeonghun
- MR: Min Kyŏnghun

Min Kyung-hoon (Korean: 민경훈; born October 6, 1984) is a South Korean singer and television personality. He is the lead vocalist of the rock band Buzz and one-half of the duo Universe Cowards with Kim Hee-chul. His first solo album, Im·pres·sive, was released on December 5, 2007. His second solo album, Picnic, was released on June 27, 2011. He is a regular cast member of South Korean variety show Knowing Brothers (JTBC).

== Career ==
=== Audition-related and trainee days ===
During his early childhood, Min never thought that he would become an entertainer. Once he entered high school, he worked with a group of peers who liked to sing. In his third year of high school, Min was recommended to audition for an entertainment company as he was famous among students for both his strong vocals and "flower boy" visuals.

Min went to the audition for AYON Entertainment along with a friend without thinking seriously about it. He auditioned for the company, which would later become Buzz's first agency, in a karaoke room. Once the company heard him sing, they liked him and wanted to immediately sign a contract with him. Min would then record songs under this agency and become a singer.

He signed a contract with the company in late spring 2002 and gave up on both sports and school to focus on singing. Min joined Buzz in June 2002 as the group's vocalist. The band's members practiced instruments together for two years. Min, having been added to the band later, often had to stay up at night and practice his vocals without rest.

=== 2003-2007: Buzz activity days ===
Buzz made their official debut with "Morning Of Buzz" on October 11, 2003. Their second studio album "Effect" included songs like "Coward", "Thorn", and "Travel to Me" that gained extreme popularity. In their third album "Perfect", the song "You Don't Know Men" was well received. He was given the nickname "Ssamja" because he made a mistake singing this song. On May 17, 2007, Buzz disbanded temporarily as the members, with the exception of Min, began their mandatory military service. Min was confirmed to continue solo activities while the members are serving the military. On June 25, 2007, Buzz released the single "Love Is My Heart, Part 2".

=== 2007-2014: Solo activity and military life ===
On December 4, 2007, Min released his first solo album "Im · pres · sive", with the advice of Buzz members and the solicitation of his former agency. Until 2009, Min and Buzz took a hiatus. During this time, Min hardly left his house and suffered from severe depression and weight gain. He claims that during this "slump", he drank alcohol as soon as he woke up, and drank again to fall asleep.

Min recovered and returned to music. On February 4, 2010, the mini-album "Reunion" was announced officially. The title song "I Love You" is one of his most popular solo songs. Min released the digital single "It's Alright" on March 29, 2010 and the soap opera My Life Is Beautiful OST "My Eternal Love", but there was no follow-up activity. In October and November 2010, he participated as a guest vocalist by singing his digital single "Wounded" and "Buzz 2" album "Fuzz-Buzz".

On June 27, 2011, Min released his second solo album "Picnic". The album had many new attempts, including fast tempo and lively songs, a change from rock ballads, a genre Min is known for. It had lower album sales compared to the previous album.

On March 6, 2012, after the release of his digital single "Look Back" on March 2, Min suddenly began his military service. He joined the Uijeongbu 306 supporters and served for 21 months. While Min was serving in the military band, he performed military band performances and concert train performances. Min finished his military service on December 5, 2013, and fans and Buzz members gathered and congratulated him.

=== 2014-present: Buzz re-union, Knowing Bros and Universe Cowards ===
On April 8, 2014, Min returned as the singer of Buzz as the band announced their comeback.

In December 2015, he joined JTBC's new variety show, Knowing Bros, as a cast member. Fellow cast members include comedians Kang Ho-dong and Lee Soo-geun and Super Junior member Kim Hee-chul.

In fall 2016, Min and Kim Hee-chul released a duet titled "Sweet Dream". The two stars are known as "Universe Cowards" when they promote their music. The song proved successful, topping the South Korean Gaon Digital Chart, an achievement known as an "all-kill". In 2017, "Sweet Dream" won the Best Rock Song award at the MelOn Music Awards.

Following the success of "Sweet Dream", in February 2018, Universe Cowards returned with "Falling Blossoms". It was composed by Lee Sang-joon and Cha Gil-wan and features lyrics written by Min, and peaked at number 15 on Gaon Digital Chart. Billboard described it as "soft pop-rock tune that grows to a soaring, emotional cacophony" and complimented how their music video was one of the most inclusive music videos South Korea's seen in some time.

Starting from November 2018, Min became a fixed cast member of the weekly variety show Problem Child in House after successful pilot episodes.

In December 2020, Universal Cowards collaborated with producer DinDin and Bibi to produce the traditional hip-hop track "Hanryang".

== Personal life ==
On July 10, 2024, it was reported that Min would marry JTBC producer Shin Ki-eun, who previously was a producer on Knowing Bros, in November. The ceremony was held on November 17 at Hotel Shilla in Seoul.

== Discography ==
=== Studio albums ===
Title	Album details	Peak chart positions	Sales
Title	Album details	KOR	Sales
Im·pres·sive	Released: December 4, 2007; Label: A1 People; Formats: CD; Track listing: 1. "Im·pres·sive"; 2. "슬픈 바보" (Sad Fool); 3. "오늘만 울자"; 4. "모래성"; 5. "죽어도 나 죽어도"; 6. "선인장"; 7. "벙어리"; 8. "나쁜 사랑"; 9. "왜..."; 10. "Hool-Hool"	6	KOR: 17,859
Picnic (소풍)	Released: June 27, 2011; Label: IS Entermedia Group; Formats: CD, digital download; Track listing: 1. "Nightmare" (악몽); 2. "One Single Word" (짧은 한마디); 3. "I Didn't Cheat On You" (바람피지 않았어); 4. "She"; 5. "Lay (Heaven Belong To You)" (빛 (Heaven Belong To You)); 6. "Happy Time"; 7. "It's You (I Got Your Love)" (너니까 (I Got Your Love)); 8. "How Do I Do" (어떡하죠 난) (feat. Lee Seok-hoon of SG Wannabe); 9. "Loving U"; 10. "Habit" (습관)	4	KOR: 4,828

=== Extended plays ===
Title	Album details	Peak chart positions	Sales
Title	Album details	KOR	Sales
Reunion (재회)	Released: February 4, 2010; Label: IS Entermedia Group; Formats: CD, digital download; Track listing: 1. "It's Love Coz It Hurts" (아프니까 사랑이죠); 2. "I Love You" (사랑해); 3. "There are No Same Goodbyes" (똑같은 이별은 없다); 4. "Deleted." (삭제되었습니다.); 5. "Just... Tears" (그저... 눈물만)	4	—N/a

=== Singles ===
Title	Year	Peak chart positions	Sales	Album
Title	Year	KOR	Sales	Album
As lead artist
"Sad Fool" (슬픈 바보)	2007	—N/a	—N/a	Im·pres·sive
"Cry Only Today" (오늘만 울자)	2007	—N/a	—N/a	Im·pres·sive
"One Day" (하루)	2008	—N/a	—N/a	Non-album single
"It's Love Coz It Hurts" (아프니까 사랑이죠)	2010	4	—N/a	Reunion
"It's Alright"	2010	21	—N/a	Non-album singles
"Wounded" (상처투성이)	2010	22	—N/a	Non-album singles
"She"	2011	9	KOR: 785,647	Picnic
"Look Back" (돌아보다)	2012	31	KOR: 201,443	Non-album singles
"The Way to Meet You" (널 만나러 가는 길)	2019	—N/a	—N/a	Non-album singles
"Guilt" (죄)	2026	—N/a	—N/a	Non-album singles
Collaborations
"Sweet Dream" (나비잠) with Kim Hee-chul	2016	1	KOR: 938,837	SM Station Season 1
"Falling Blossoms" (후유증) with Kim Hee-chul	2018	15	—N/a	Non-album single
"Hanryang" (한량) with Kim Hee-chul (Feat. BIBI, Prod. DinDin)	2020	190	—N/a	Non-album single
"I Should Not Have Loved You" (사랑하지 말걸 그랬나 봐요) with DinDin	2021	—	—N/a	Non-album single
"—" denotes release did not chart.

=== Soundtrack appearances ===
Title	Year	Album
"Climax"	2008	The Lawyers of The Great Republic Korea OST
"Life is Beautiful"	2010	Life Is Beautiful OST
"Hero"	2015	SPY OST
"Love You"	2016	The K2 OST
"Here I am"	2017	Live Up to Your Name OST
"Waiting here for you"	2018	Money Flower OST
"Forever Love"	2019	Kill It OST
"Welcome 2 Life"	2019	Welcome 2 Life OST
"Lost Life"	2020	Rugal OST
"The Time is Now"	2022	The Golden Spoon OST
"Confession of My Youth"	2022	Mental Coach Jegal OST

== Filmography ==
=== Television ===
Year	Title	Role	Notes	Ref.
2015–present	Knowing Bros	Cast	Episodes 2 – present	
2017	Girl Group Battle	Co-Host	Lunar New Year Special	
2017	I Came Alone	Co-Host	Chuseok Pilot Special	
2017	What Shall We Eat Today - Delivery	Cast		
2018	Human Intelligence – The Most Perfect A.I.	Users		
2018–2023	Problem Child in House	Cast Member		
2019	Stories of Two Cities - Sokcho & Wonsan	Narrator	Season 2, Lunar New Year Special	
2019	Shopping Mall (Shopping Nagger)	Cast	Seasons 1 and 2	
2019	Hon-Life: Satisfaction Project	Cast	Episodes 1, 2	
2022	Secret Man and Woman	Host		

== Awards and nominations ==
Year	Award	Category	Nominated work	Result	Ref
2016	2nd JTBC Awards	Best Duo Award with Kim Hee-chul	Knowing Bros	Won	
2017	6th Gaon Chart Music Awards	Song of the Year (November) with Kim Hee-chul	"Sweet Dream"	Nominated	
2017	9th Melon Music Awards	Best Rock Song with Kim Hee-chul	"Sweet Dream"	Won	
2018	10th Melon Music Awards	Best Rock Song with Kim Hee-chul	"Falling Blossoms"	Won	
2019	8th Gaon Chart Music Awards	Song of the Year (February) with Kim Hee-chul	"Falling Blossoms"	Nominated	
2019	17th KBS Entertainment Awards	Excellence Award in Entertainment Category	Problem Child in House	Nominated	
2020	18th KBS Entertainment Awards	Excellence Award in Show/Variety Category	Problem Child in House	Nominated	
