= 2018 Melon Music Awards =

2018 South Korean music award ceremony

- Date: December 1, 2018
- Location: Gocheok Sky Dome, Seoul, South Korea
- Most awards: BTS (7)
- Website: www.melon.com/mma/index.htm

Television/radio coverage
- Network: JTBC2; JTBC4; 1theK; KakaoTV; Daum; Melon
- Runtime: 240 minutes

The 2018 Melon Music Awards ceremony, organized by Kakao M (a kakao company) through its online music store, Melon, took place on December 1, 2018 at the Gocheok Sky Dome in Seoul, South Korea. This was the tenth ceremony in the show's history.

Wanna One, iKon and BTS took home the grand prizes, also known as the "Daesang Awards".

== Judging criteria ==
Division	Online Voting	Digital Sales	Judge Score
Main awards*	20%	60%	20%
Genre Awards**	30%	40%	30%
Popularity Awards***	60%	40%	—
Special Awards****	—	—	100%
*Artist of the Year, Album of the Year, Song of the Year, Top 10 Artists, Best New Artist; **Rap/Hip Hop, R&B/Ballad, Rock, OST, Trot, Pop, Dance, Folk/Blue, Indie, Electronic; ***Netizen Popularity Award, Hot Trend Award; ****Music Video Award, Song Writer Award, MBC Music Star Award, Performing Arts Award, Global Star Award, QQ Asia Artist Award, Hall of Fame Award, Kakao Hot Star Award

== Performers and presenters ==
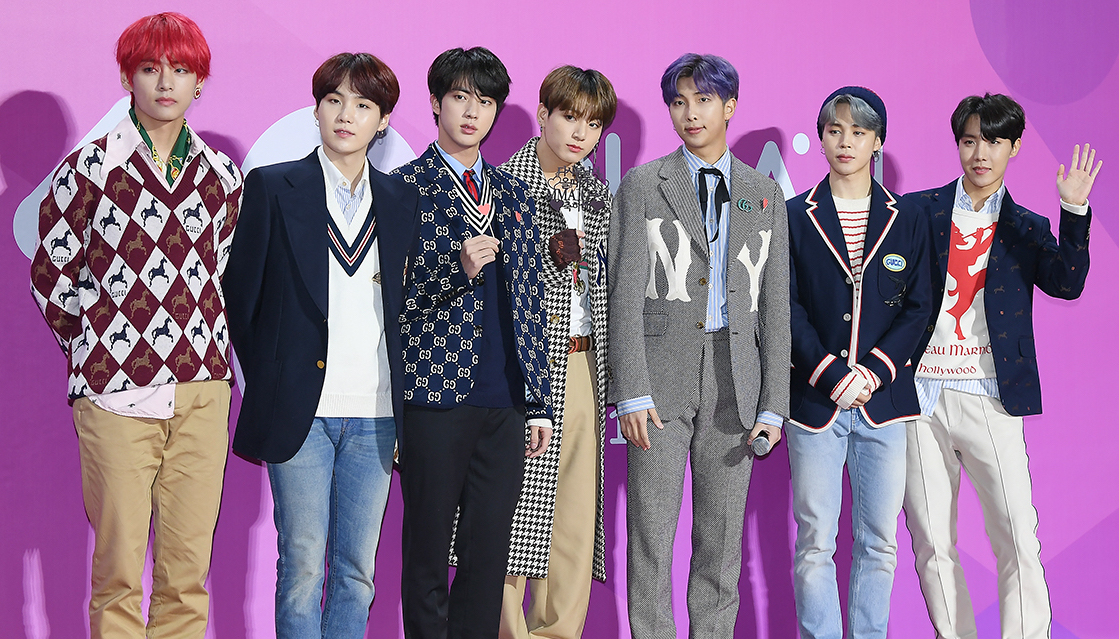
BTS on the 2018 Melon Music Awards red carpet

The following individuals and groups, listed in order of appearance, presented awards or performed musical numbers.

=== Performers ===
Name(s)	Performance(s)	Notes
Momoland	"Bboom Bboom"	"Youth Festival I"
GFriend	"Time for the Moon Night"	"Fly Me To The Moon"
Hong Jin young	"Intro Tango Performance" + "Goodbye (Tango Ver.)"	"Por Una Cabeza"
Dance War	"Unlimited", "DNA" and "Ddu-Du Ddu-Du"	"Unlimited"
(G)I-dle	"Hann", "Soyeon Rap Performance" and "Latata"	"Fatal Love"
The Boyz	"No Air" and "Boy"	"To All The Boyz I've Loved Before"
Apink	"I'm So Sick"	"Moulin Rouge"
Roy Kim	"Only Then"	"My Story"
iKon	"Intro + Love Scenario" and "Goodbye Road"	"A Short Film About Parting"
Blackpink	"Ddu-Du Ddu-Du"	"The Devil: Dangerous"
BtoB	"Missing You" and "Beautiful Pain"	"Moment To Remember"
Bolbbalgan4	"Travel"	"Travel to Myself"
Mamamoo	"Wind Flower", "Starry Night" and "Egotistic"	Shadow Of The Black Moon
Wanna One	"Intro + Light", "Destiny" and "Spring Breeze"	Youth Festival II
BTS	"Intro + Fake Love", "Airplane Pt. 2" and "Intro + Idol + Outro"	"Love Yourself, In BTS' Own Words"

=== Presenters ===
Name(s)	Notes
B.I	Opening
Wanna One	Presenter for Best New Artists
Nam Ji-hyun	Presenter for Top 10 Artists (BTS and iKon)
Heo Kyung-hwan and Jeon So-nee	Presenter for Dance War and 1theK Performance Award
Lee Sang-yeob and Kim Hee-jung	Presenter for Best Ballad and Best Rap / Hiphop
Kim Ho-young, Bae Jung-nam and Na Hae-un	Presenter for Best of Dance Performance
Park Sung-kwang and Jung Da-bin	Presenter for Kakao Hot Star Award
Shin Seung-ho and Kim Yong-ji	Presenter for Hot Trend Award
Lee Yu-bi	Presenter for Top 10 Artists (Bol4 and Wanna One)
Ryu Hyun-jin	Presenter for Global Artist
Lee Yeong-ja	Presenter for Netizen Popularity Award
Choi Daniel	Presenter for Top 10 Artists (Apink and Mamamoo)
Lee Hyun-hee and Kim Jae-hyun	Presenter for Best Song Writer
Hyunjae (The Boyz) and Soyeon ((G)I-dle)	Presenter for 10th Anniversary Best Song
Jung So-min	Presenter for Top 10 Artists (Blackpink and BtoB)
	Presenter for Song of the Year
Lee Dong-wook	Presenter for Album of the Year
Go Soo	Presenter for Record of the Year
Lee Byung-hun	Presenter for Artist of the Year

== Winners and nominees ==
Only artists who released music between December 2, 2017 and October 25, 2018 were eligible, and the nominees were selected by calculating the number of downloads, streams, and weekly Melon Popularity Award votes achieved by each artist.

Winners are listed first and highlighted in boldface. Voting for Top 10 Artists took place on the Melon Music website from October 26 through November 13, 2018. Voting for Category awards took place from November 14 through November 30, 2018.

=== Voted Awards ===
Top 10 Artists	Song of the Year (Daesang)
**Apink**; **Blackpink**; **Bolbbalgan4**; **BtoB**; **BTS**; **Exo**; **iKon**; **Mamamoo**; **Twice**; **Wanna One**; List of nominated artists: Ben; Big Bang; Camila Cabello; Chungha; Dean; Epik High; Exo-CBX; GFriend; Haon; Heize; Hwasa (Mamamoo); ISU (MC the Max); Jang Deok Cheol; Jung Seung-hwan; Loco; MeloMance; Minseo; Momoland; Nilo; Paul Kim; Red Velvet; Roy Kim; Seventeen; Shaun; Sunmi; Vinxen; Winner; Yang Da-il; Yong Jun-hyung (Highlight); Yoon Jong-shin	**iKon – "Love Scenario"**; BTS – "Fake Love"; Mamamoo – "Starry Night"; Twice – "Heart Shaker"; Blackpink – "Ddu-Du Ddu-Du"
Artist of the Year (Daesang)	Album of the Year (Daesang)
**BTS**; Exo; Wanna One; iKon; Twice	**BTS – Love Yourself: Tear**; Wanna One – 0+1=1 (I Promise You); iKon – Return; Blackpink – Square Up; Bolbbalgan4 – Red Diary Page.2
Best New Male Artist	Best New Female Artist
**The Boyz**; Yoo Seon Ho; Haon; Stray Kids; Vinxen	**(G)I-dle**; Iz*One; Loona; Fromis 9; Minseo
Best Dance Award (Male)	Best Dance Award (Female)
**Wanna One – "Boomerang"**; Exo-CBX – "Blooming Day"; NU'EST W – "Dejavu"; Seventeen – "Thanks"; Seungri – "1, 2, 3!"	**Blackpink – "Ddu-Du Ddu-Du"**; Chungha – "Roller Coaster"; Mamamoo – "Starry Night"; Twice – "Heart Shaker"; Momoland – "Bboom Bboom"
Best Rap/Hip Hop Award	Best R&B/Soul Award
**BTS – "Fake Love"**; Winner – "Everyday"; iKon – "Love Scenario"; Heize – "Jenga" (feat. Gaeko); Haon – "Boong Boong" (feat. Sik-K) (Prod. GroovyRoom)	**IU – "Bbibbi"**; Dean – "Instagram"; Big Bang – "Flower Road"; Yang Da-il – "Lie"; Zico – "Soulmate" (feat. IU)
Best Indie Award	Best Rock Award
**MeloMance – "Tale"**; 10cm – "Mattress"; Shaun – "Way Back Home"; Yun Ddan Ddan – "In My Room"; OVAN – "Drunk Night" (feat. Jinsil of Mad Soul Child)	**Kim Hee-chul, Min Kyung-hoon – "Falling Blossoms"**; Day6 – "I Like You"; Sungkyu – "True Love"; Hyukoh – "Lova Ya!"; Oohyo – "Honey Tea"
Best Trot Award	Best OST Award
**Hong Jin-young – "Good Bye"**; Kang Ho-dong, Hong Jin-young – "I Kicked My Luck Off"; Kim Young Chul (feat. Wheesung) – "Andenayon"; Na Hoon-a – "Hongshi"; Boom – "Boy Next Door"	**Paul Kim – "Every Day, Every Moment (Should We Kiss First?)"**; Roy Kim – "No Longer Mine" (Familiar Wife); Heize – "Would Be Better" (Prison Playbook); MeloMance – "Good Day" (Mr. Sunshine); Sondia – "Adult" (My Mister)
Best Pop Award	Best Ballad Award
**Camila Cabello – "Havana" (featuring Young Thug)**; Charlie Puth – "Attention"; Imagine Dragons – "Thunder"; Marshmello, Anne-Marie – "Friends"; "The Greatest Showman" Ensemble – "This Is Me"	**Roy Kim – "Only Then"**; BtoB – "Only One For Me"; Yong Junhyung – "Sudden Shower"; Loco, Hwasa – "Don't Give It To Me"; MeloMance – "You"
Netizen Popularity Award	Hot Trend Award
**BTS**; Exo; Wanna One; BtoB; Winner; iKon; Mamamoo; Twice; Red Velvet; Big Bang	**Loco, Hwasa – "Don't"**; Baekhyun, Loco – "Young"; Jang Jae-in, Suho – "Do You Have a Moment"; Taeyeon, MeloMance – "Page 0"; Soyou, Sung Si Kyung – "I Still"

=== Other awards ===
Nominess	Winners
Record of the Year (Daesang)	Wanna One
Best Music Video Award	Ko Yoo-jeong (Lumpens) (GFriend's "Time for the Moon Night")
Stage of the Year	Lee Sun Hee
Best Songwriter Award	iKon's B.I
Global Artist Award	BTS
Kakao Hot Star	BTS
1theK Performance Award	Momoland
