= Buzz (band) =

South Korean rock band

- Origin: South Korea
- Genres: Rock, pop-rock, power ballad
- Years active: 2000–2007, 2010–present
- Label: Santa Music
- Members: Yoon Woo-hyun; Min Kyung-hoon; Son Sung-hee; Kim Ye-joon; Shin Joon-ki
- Past members: Na Do-kyun; Min Dae-hong; Park Jeong-hoon

Buzz (Korean: 버즈) is a South Korean pop rock band formed in 2000. The band currently consists of members Yoon Woo-hyun (guitars), Min Kyung-hoon (vocals), Son Sung-hee (guitars), Kim Ye-joon (drums), and Shin Joon-ki (bass).. The band found major success in South Korea, becoming one of the most influential South Korean rock bands of the 2000s. Buzz's major success in 2006 was marked by three of the band's songs reaching the MTV Korea top 10 list in a mere week, consecutively "My Love", "My Darling", and "You Don't Know Men" (남자를 몰라). In addition, the song "Savior" (은인) made it to the top 14.

In July 2007, the band officially went on hiatus as four of the band members began, or had already begun, to serve the 26 month mandatory service in the South Korean Army required of all South Korean men. Min Kyung-hoon, the vocalist of the group proceeded in a solo career while the anticipated fourth album was due to be completed once the band completed their duties. A new vocalist, Na Do-Kyun, was auditioned at a later stage. After Na left the group, he debuted with HISTORY, a boy band under LOEN Entertainment that has since disbanded.

== History ==
=== Forming process ===
In 1998. Buzz began its formation after guitarist Son Sung-hee heard of drummer Kim Ye-jun was popular for playing the drums at Sangmun High School although dance music had been dominating the Korean music scene with the advent of Seo Tai-ji and Boys in 1992.

After a year, Son and Kim joined Aiwon Entertainment and was suggested to fill the rest of the band. After some time, Son and Kim met with the Yun Woo-Hyun, who signed the contract with Aiwon Entertainment before the two. Eventually, Aiwon Entertainment hired Shin Jun-ki and Park Jeong-hoon, who was replaced by Min Kyung-hoon in 2002.

In 2000, the pop-rock band Buzz was formed, a band formed by the long-activated youths in the underground market who all had the wish to perform in a band.

=== 2003–2007: Debut and successful first albums ===
Buzz made their official debut with the album "Morning of Buzz" on October 11, 2003. Following their debut album, Buzz's second album, "Buzz Effect", was released on March 3, 2005. It contains several songs, such as "Coward", "Thorn" and "Travel to me". In their third album "Perfect", the song "You Don't Know Men" was well received. On May 17, 2007, Buzz disbanded temporarily due to the members' military service. Min was confirmed to continue solo activities while the members were in the military. On June 25, 2007, Buzz released their last single, "Love Is My Heart, Part 2".

=== 2014–present ===
On April 8, 2014, following the members' discharge from military service, Buzz announced their comeback. Through the digital singles "Summer of the Eight Years" and "Train", Buzz demonstrated the change of musical style over the years. On November 26, 2014, Buzz's 4th album "Memorize" was released.

In 2017, Buzz released their first mini album "Be One". The title song, "The Love" ("사랑하지 않은 것처럼") charted very well on Korean music charts and its music video on YouTube has reached 12 million views as of date.

On December 14, 2018, Buzz released their second mini album "<15>", with the title song "척" ("Missing you"). On December 12, 2019, Buzz released a new single for Christmas called "Christmas Song".

On March 10, 2021, they comeback with their third mini album "The Lost Time" (잃어버린 시간).

== Members ==
=== Current members ===
- Kim Ye-joon (김예준) – drums, percussion, leader (2000–2007; 2010–present)
- Yoon Woo-hyun (윤우현) – guitars (2000–2007; 2010–present)
- Shin Joon-ki (신준기) – bass guitar (2000–2007; 2010–present)
- Son Sung-hee (손성희) – guitars (2000–2007; 2010–present)
- Min Kyung-hoon (민경훈) – lead vocals (2002–2007; 2014–present)

=== Former members ===
- Park Jeong-hoon (박정훈) – lead vocals (2000–2002)
- Na Do-kyun (나도균) – lead vocals (2010–2012)
- Min Dae-hong (민대홍) – lead vocals (2012–2014)

== Discography ==
=== Studio albums ===
Title	Album details	Peak chart positions	Sales
Title	Album details	KOR	Sales
Morning of Buzz	Released: October 10, 2003; Label: Yejeon Media; Formats: CD, cassette; Track listing: 1. Monologue; 2. 어쩌면...; 3. 1st 4. B612; 5. The...; 6. 사랑 뒤의 사랑; 7. 약속; 8. 어느 소녀의 희망; 9. 잘 살아요; 10. 가버려!; 11. It's U 12. To.FAN; 13. Morning of Buzz	10	KOR: 82,399+
Effect	Released: March 3, 2005; Label: Yejeon Media; Formats: CD, cassette; Track listing: 1. 겁쟁이; 2. 벌 3. 1st 4. 거짓말; 5. 나에게로 떠나는 여행; 6. Funny Rock; 7. 내가 아니죠...; 8. 가시; 9. 비망록 (스물 의 노래); 10. Tomorrow; 11. 일기	1	KOR: 251,733+
Perfect	Released: April 24, 2006; Label: Yejeon Media; Formats: CD, cassette; Track listing: 1. Intro; 2. My Darling (End); 3. My Love (And); 4. 은인; 5. 약자의 눈물; 6. 행복하세요; 7. 남자를 몰라; 8. 가버려!; 9. 일년쯤이면...; 10. 미완예찬; 11. Reds, go together 12. 우리 이별앞에 지지말아요	2	KOR: 118,447+
Memorize	Released: November 26, 2014; Label: Stone Music Entertainment; Formats: CD, digital download; Track listing: 1. Memorize; 2. Train (2014 song); 3. 안녕; 4. 나무; 5. Good Day; 6. 그대여; 7. 그림자; 8. 8년만의 여름; 9. 너는 나의 꽃이야; 10. 나무 (Original Ver.); 11. Star	11	KOR: 2,236+

=== Extended plays ===
Title	Album details	Peak chart positions	Sales
Title	Album details	KOR	Sales
Be One	Released: July 28, 2017; Label: Stone Music Entertainment; Formats: CD, digital download; Track listing: 1. Just One; 2. 사랑하지 않은 것처럼 (The Love); 3. 동행 (Accompany); 4. Tonight; 5. 그때 우리 (Then, Us)	9	KOR: 5,301+
15	Released: December 14, 2018; Label: Stone Music Entertainment; Formats: CD, digital download; Track listing: 1. 너의 이름은 (Your Name Is); 2. 척 (Missing You); 3. 돈키호테 (Don Quixote); 4. 너밖에 없다 (No One Else But You); 5. 손깍지 (Handfold); 6. 척 (Missing You) inst.	—	—N/a
The Lost Time (잃어버린 시간)	Released: March 10, 2021; Label: Stone Music Entertainment; Formats: CD, digital download; Track listing: 1. 아날로그 (Analogue); 2. 그대라서 (Because It's You); 3. Lighthouse; 4. 비 (Rain); 5. 위로 (Console); 6. 내일은 (Tomorrow)	33	—N/a

=== Singles ===
Title	Year	Peak chart positions		Album
Title	Year	KOR Gaon	KOR Hot 100	Album
"A Poor Love" (가난한 사랑)	2004	No data	No data	Non-album singles
"Love Comes from the Heart" (사랑은 가슴이 시킨다)	2005	No data	No data	Non-album singles
"Don't Cry" (울지마)	2006	No data	No data	Non-album singles
"Love Comes from the Heart 2"	2007	No data	No data	Non-album singles
"My Heart Is Crying" (가슴이 운다)	2012	41	71	Buzz Returns single album
"The First Summer in 8 Years" (8년만의 여름)	2014	23	No data	Memorize
"Train"	2014	95	No data	Memorize
"If You're a Man" (남자라면)	2015	—	No data	Non-album singles
"Forever Love"	2015	14	No data	Non-album singles
"Love Comes from the Heart 3"	2015	19	No data	Non-album singles
"Still with You" (넌 살아있다)	2016	21	No data	Non-album singles
"The Love" (사랑하지 않은 것처럼)	2017	6	48	Be One
"Missing You" (척)	2018	—	—	15
"Christmas Song" (크리스마스의밤)	2019	—	—	Non-album single
"Analogue" (아날로그)	2021	116	—	The Lost Time
"Dreaming"	2021	—	—	Non-album single
"—" denotes song did not chart. The Gaon Digital Chart was launched in 2010. The Kpop Hot 100 was launched in 2011, discontinued in May 2014, and relaunched in May 2017.

=== Other charted songs ===
Title	Year	Peak chart positions	Album
Title	Year	KOR Circle	Album
"My Love (And)"	2006	178	Perfect

== Awards ==
Year	Award	Category	Nominated work	Result	Ref.
2004	2004 Mnet Asian Music Awards	Best New Group Video	"Monologue"	Nominated	
2004	SBS Gayo Daejeon	Rock Division	—N/a	Won	
2005	2005 Mnet Asian Music Awards	Best Male Group	"Coward"	Nominated	
2005	2005 Mnet Asian Music Awards	Best Rock Performance	"Coward"	Won	
2006	2006 Mnet Asian Music Awards	Artist of the Year	"You Don't Know Men"	Nominated	
2006	2006 Mnet Asian Music Awards	Song of the Year	"You Don't Know Men"	Nominated	
2006	2006 Mnet Asian Music Awards	Best Group	"You Don't Know Men"	Nominated	
2006	2006 Mnet Asian Music Awards	Best Rock Performance	"You Don't Know Men"	Won	
