= List of Kim Hee-chul performances =

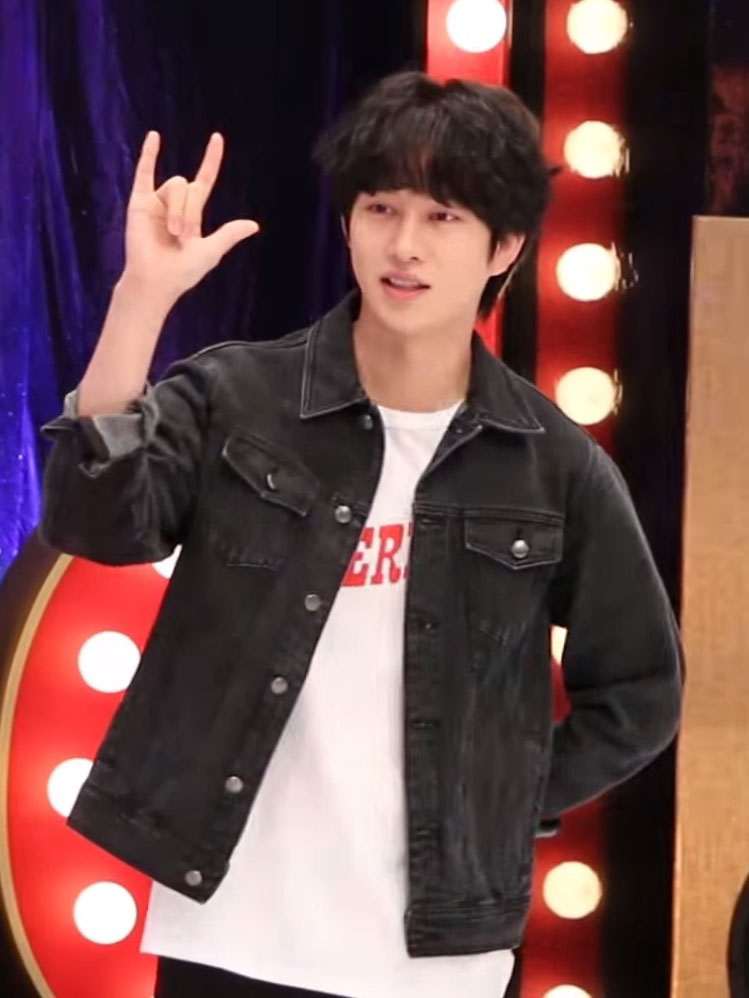
Kim Hee-chul during a Singderella press conference in 2016

Kim Hee-chul (born July 10, 1983) is a South Korean singer-songwriter, rapper, actor and television personality, and a member of the K-pop boy band Super Junior. He made his acting debut as Baek Jin-woo in the second season of the teen-drama television series Sharp (2005), and acted in leading roles in Rainbow Romance (2005–2006) and Flower Grandpa Investigation Unit (2014); and in supporting roles in Bad Family (2006), Golden Bride (2007–2008), and Loving You a Thousand Times (2009–2010). He starred in the high-school mystery and comedy film Attack on the Pin-Up Boys (2007) in his film debut, and voiced Simon Seville in the South Korean dub of Alvin and the Chipmunks.

Kim started his career as a host on the weekly music show Show! Music Tank in 2005. He was a recurrent host of Inkigayo between 2005 and 2006, before becoming a regular host from 2007 until 2008. Kim was the host of the talk show Radio Star between 2010 and 2011, for which he won the Best Newcomer Award at the 11th MBC Entertainment Awards. He became a radio DJ through the radio programs Young Street Radio (2005–2006), and later Kim Heechul's Youngstreet (2010–2011). In 2011, he enlisted in the military as a public service worker and hosted the Seongdong District's web radio program Space for a Rest – Visible Radio (2012–2013) as part of his service.

Kim's popularity skyrocketed after he was cast in the variety show Knowing Bros in 2015 alongside veteran host Kang Ho-dong and vocalist Min Kyung-hoon. His role in the show earned him his first Baeksang Arts Awards nomination, in the Best Male Variety Performer category at the 56th ceremony. He also won the Best Entertainer Award, and the Best Couple Award with Min, at the 5th JTBC Awards for his role in the show. The duo have since released the singles "Sweet Dream" (2016), "Falling Blossoms" (2018) and "Hanryang" (2020) through the variety show, the first two of which earned them Best Rock Song Awards at the 9th and 10th Melon Music Awards, respectively. Kim has also been a regular cast member on the reality shows My Little Old Boy and Delicious Rendezvous since 2019, for both of which he received the Excellence Award at the 13th SBS Entertainment Awards and the Top Excellence Award at the 14th SBS Entertainment Awards.

Kim has acted in several music videos, including in TraxX's "Let You Go" and Sistar's "Shady Girl", both released in 2010; directed music videos including M&D's "Close Ur Mouth" (2011; his directorial debut), "I Wish" (2015), "Narcissus" (2016) and "Ulsanbawi" (2016); and wrote the screenplays to "Falling Blossoms" (2018), "Old Movie" (2019) and "White Winter" (2019).

== Films ==
Film performances
Title	Year	Role	Notes	Ref.
Attack on the Pin-Up Boys	2007	Kim Hee-chul	(Note: He plays a character with the same name as himself.)	
Alvin and the Chipmunks	2007	Simon Seville	Voice (Korean dub)	
Super Show 3 3D	2011	Himself		
SM Town The Stage	2015	Himself		
Familyhood	2016	Himself	Cameo	
Hello, My Cat	2019	Sa Rang Yi	Voice (Cat)	

== Television shows ==
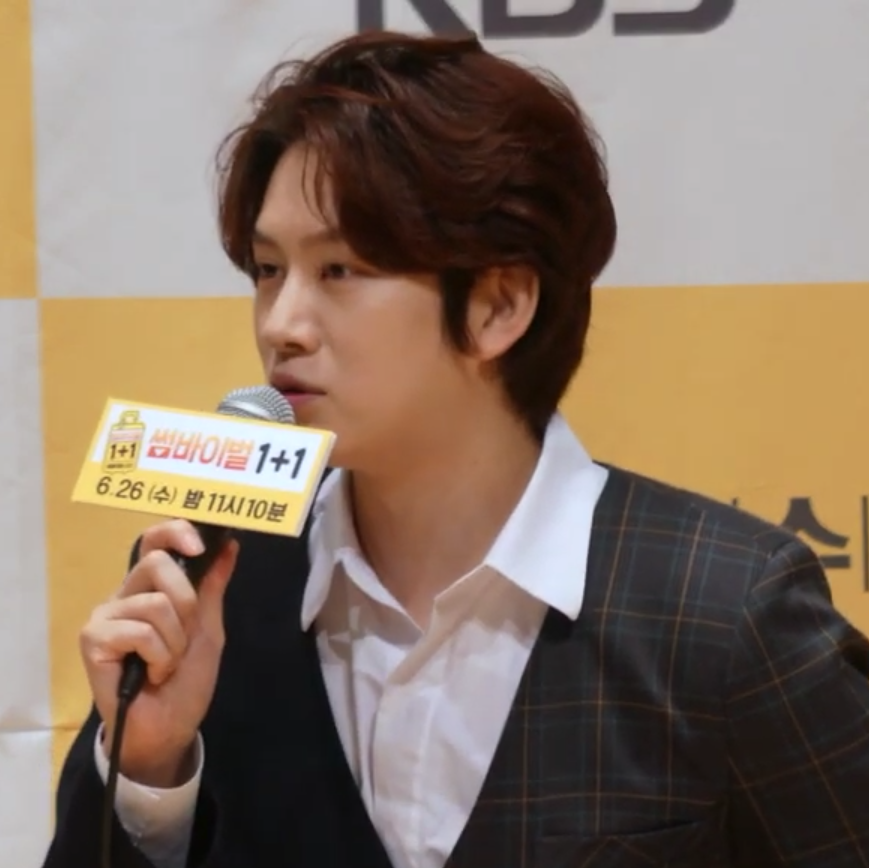
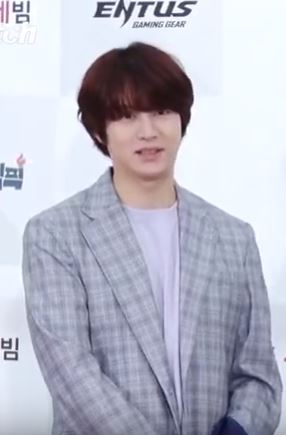
Kim Hee-chul at the press conferences of Matching Survival 1+1 (top) and Game Dolympics 2019: Golden Card (bottom) in 2019

Key
‡	Current programs
†	Works that have not yet been aired

Television performances
Title	Year	Role	Notes	Ref.
Sharp 2	2005	Baek Jin-woo	Season 2, episodes 1–35	
Show! Music Tank	2005	Host		
Loveholic	2005	Joo Ho	Bit part appearance	
Super Junior Show	2005–2006	Cast member	With Super Junior 05	(Note: Super Junior 05 was a 12-member project group, which debut on November 6, 2005. In 2006, Following the addition of thirteenth member Kyuhyun, the group dropped the suffix "05" and officially named as Super Junior.)
Rainbow Romance	2005–2006	Kim Hee-chul		
Inkigayo	2005–2008; 2010; 2014–2015; 2017	Host	Regular host for episodes 428–434, 436–457 and 460–483; Guest host for eight other episodes, with various co-hosts	
Bad Family	2006	Gong Min		
Mystery 6	2006	Cast member	Cameo	
Princess Diary	2006	Cast member	With Super Junior	
Full House	2006	Cast member		
Golden Bride	2007–2008	Kim Young-soo		
Explorers of the Human Body	2007–2008	Cast member		
8 vs 1	2008	Host	Episodes 1–8, 10	
To Be Kangin And Heechul	2008	Cast member	With Kangin and Lee Gun-myung	
Band of Brothers	2008–2009	Cast member		
Good Daddy	2008–2009	Cast member		
Hilarious Housewives	2009	Kim Hee-chul	Cameo in episode 116	
Loving You a Thousand Times	2009–2010	Lee Chul		
Family Outing	2010	Cast member	Season 2, episodes 12–17	
I Am Legend	2010	Himself	Cameo in episode 15	
Radio Star	2010–2011	Host	Standing in for the regular host Shin Jung-hwan in episodes 160–162; Host on episodes 165–205	
The Night the Memories Shine Bright	2011	Host	Episodes 1–5, 8–16, 18–21	
Melody of Youth	2011	Shen Tai Yi	Chinese drama	
Secret	2011	Host	Episodes 1–14	
Immortal Songs: Singing the Legend	2011; 2015	Contestant	Special guest for duet with Lee Hong-gi in episode 6, as one-half of the duo M&D with Kim Jung-mo in episode 191	
The Heirs	2013	Himself	Cameo in episode 4	
Ssulzun	2013–2014	Host	Entertainment Judge segment	
We Got Married Global Edition	2014	Cast member	Partnered with Puff Kuo in season 2	
Flower Grandpa Investigation Unit	2014	Park Jung-woo		
Make A Wish	2014	Host	With Kim Sung-joo and Yoo Young-seok in pilot episode	
My Tutor Friend	2014–2015	Cast member	Partnered with Jeong Jun-ha in episodes 1–10	
Wednesday Food Talk	2015	Panelist	Episodes 1–13	
A Style For You	2015	Host		
4 Things Show – Kim Hee-chul	2015	Cast member	Season 2, episode 15, documentary about Kim Hee-chul	
MAPS	2015	Cast member	With Simon D, Yuri, Choi Kang-hee	
Duet Song Festival 8+	2015	Panelist	Pilot episode	
National Idol Singing Contest	2015	Panelist	Chuseok special	
All the Way with You	2015–2016	Host	Seasons 1 and 2, Chinese reality show	
Weekly Idol	2015–2017	Host	Season 1, standing in for the regular host Jung Hyung-don in episodes 229–230, 245–270, 275; Season 1, special host in episode 300	
Knowing Bros‡	2015–present	Cast member		
Code: Secret Room	2016	Contestant	Season 1, eliminated in round 7	
National Championship	2016	Host	Episode 7, standing in for the regular host, Jun Hyun-moo	
Show Champion in Manila	2016	Host	Episode 200, with Kim Shin-young	
Perhaps Love	2016	Cast member	Partnered with Li Feier in season 3, Chinese reality show	
Singderella	2016–2017	Host	Seasons 1 and 2	
Phantom Singer	2016–2017	Host	Season 1	
Lipstick Prince	2016–2017	Host	Seasons 1 and 2	
Secretly Greatly	2016–2017	Host		
Game Show Yoo Hee Nak Rak	2016–2018	Host		
Syndrome Man	2017	Host	With Kim Gu-ra, Kim Min-jong, Jung Yong-hwa in pilot episode	
Bragging Room Guest	2017	Host	Pilot episodes	
Pot Stand	2017	Host	Episodes 1, 3, 6, 13	
Living Together in Empty Room	2017	Cast member	Partnered with GFriend in episodes 8–11	
Idol School	2017	Homeroom teacher		
Fantastic Duo	2017	Contestant	Season 2, appeared as "Hoengseong Hanwoo Universal Big Star" in episode 33	
Perfect on Paper	2017–2018	Host		
Life Bar	2017–2019	Host	Season 2	
My Daughter's Men	2017–2019	Host	Seasons 2–4	
Super TV	2018	Cast member	Seasons 1 and 2	
1 Percent of Friendship	2018	Host & Cast member	Episodes 1–9, 13 and 14	
Where Are You Going, DdaengChul?	2018	Cast member		
Miracle Project Pick Me Pick Me	2018	Host	With Shindong in Chuseok special	
Begin A Game	2018	Host		
Six-Party Talks	2019	Panelist	Pilot episodes	
Channel Rental	2019	Cast member	Episodes 1 and 2	
Studio Vibes	2019	Host		
Paik's Mysterious Kitchen	2019	Host	Pilot episodes	
Why Did You Come To My House?	2019	Cast member		
My Sibling's Lovers: Family Is Watching	2019	Host		
Matching Survival 1+1	2019	Host		
Game Dolympic 2019: Golden Card	2019	Host	With Shindong	
Hon-Life: Satisfaction Project	2019	Cast member	Episodes 3 and 4	
A Man Who Feeds The Dog	2019	Cast member	Season 4	
Player 7	2019	Host	Season 1, special host in episode 16	
Studio Music Hall	2019–2020	Host	Seasons 1 and 2	
Delicious Rendezvous	2019–2021	Cast member	Episodes 1–78	
My Little Old Boy‡	2019–present	Cast member	Special host in episode 146; Cast member in episodes 153–present	
The Dreamer	2020	Host		
King of Mask Singer	2020	Contestant	Appeared as "X-Generation" in episodes 241 and 242	
Love of 7.7 Billion	2020	Host		
Top 10 Student	2020	Host		
Stay-At-Home Chorus	2020	Cast member	Pilot episode	
After School Activities: Universe Hipsters	2020–2021	Cast member		
Problem Child in House	2020–2021	Host	Standing in for the regular host Jung Hyung-don in episodes 110, 112–117	
20th Century Hit Song‡	2020–present	Host		
Friends	2021	Host		
Long Live Independence	2021	Host		
Super Junior Comeback Show House Party	2021	Cast member	With Super Junior	
Falling for Korea - Transnational Couples	2021	Host	Season 1	
Petkage	2021	Host		
Steel Troops	2021–2023	Panelist	Seasons 1–3	
Boss in the Mirror	2022–2024	Host	Special host for episodes 169–170; Regular host for episodes 179–257	
Super Junior: The Last Man Standing	2023	Cast member		
Steel Unit W	2024	Panelist		
Woke Up to SuperTV	2025	Cast member		

== Web series ==
Performances in web series
Title	Year	Role	Notes	Ref.
Super Junior Devil's Feast	2015	Cast member		
NCT On Air	2016	Host	A reality show starring NCT	
SJ Returns	2017–2019	Cast member	Seasons 1–3	
High School Style Icon	2019–2020	Host	Seasons 1 and 2	
Legend Club: Heechul's Shindong PC Room	2019–2020	Host		
Wannabe Ryan	2020	Head Student		
Celebrity's Private Life	2020–2021	Cast member		
Duck's Tour	2021	Protagonist		
Recipe For Youth	2021	Jeon Seong-ki	Web drama	
Because It's My First Time	2021	Cast member		
Real Marketing Show, "Production Z"	2021	Cast member		
New World	2021	Cast Member		
Street Alcohol Fighter	2021–2022	Host	Seasons 1 and 2	
Real Marketing Show, "Production 522"	2022	Cast member		
Game Addendum	2022	Host	Seasons 1 and 2	
Lineage W Rap Up	2022	Host		
Pink Rye	2022	Panelist		
One Earth: ARTPIA	2023	Host		
Brain Defiler	2024–2025	Host	Seasons 1 and 2	
USPEER RUN UP!	2025	Special MC	Episodes 5 and 6	
V-REAL	2025–present	Host		
Kim Heechul's Chuka Chuka Chu	2025–present	Host		

== Stage ==
Stage performances
Title	Year	Role	Notes	Ref.
Xanadu	2008	Sonny	Performed at Doosan Art Center from September 9–November 23, at Goyang Oulim Nuri Arts Center from December 18–20, and at Busan Cultural Center from December 27–28	

== Radio shows ==
Radio broadcasts
Title	Year	Partner(s)	Ref.
Kim Heechul – Park Heevon's Young Street Radio	2005–2006	Park Hee-von	
Kim Heechul's Youngstreet Radio	2010–2011	None	
Space for a Rest – Visible Radio	2012–2013	None	
HeeStory Late Night Radio	2021	None	
Chengdong Travel Visual Radio	2022	None	

== Events ==
Event hosting
Event	Year	Partner(s)	Ref.
Welcome to KM World	2007	Song Ji-hyo	
8th Sharing Love Concert	2007	Yoon Hyeon-jin, Lee Seung-gi	
14th Dream Concert	2008	Song Ji-hyo, Park Soo-hong	
15th Dream Concert	2009	Song Ji-hyo, MC Mong	
14th SBS Gayo Daejeon	2009	Jung Yong-hwa, Park Shin-hye	
16th Dream Concert	2010	Shin Se-kyung, Taecyeon	
15th SBS Gayo Daejeon	2010	Jung Yong-hwa, Jo Kwon, Hwang Jung-eum	
17th Dream Concert	2011	Goo Hara, Song Joong-ki	
18th SBS Gayo Daejeon	2013	Sandara Park, Sung Si-kyung	
HongKi <FM302> Solo Debut Showcase	2015	None	
Suwon K-Pop Super Concert	2016	Zhou Mi, Momo Hirai, Chaeyoung	
26th Seoul Music Awards	2017	Tak Jae-hoon, Jeon So-mi	
Lovelyz <R U Ready?> Showcase	2017	Yoon Sang	
17th MBC Entertainment Awards	2017	Yang Se-hyung, Han Hye-jin	
27th Seoul Music Awards	2018	Shin Dong-yup, Kim So-hyun	
28th Seoul Music Awards	2019	Shin Dong-yup, Kim So-hyun	
Itzy <It'z ICY> Showcase	2019	None	
13th Non-Smoking Festival Concert	2019	Jo Jeong-sik	
29th Seoul Music Awards	2020	Shin Dong-yup, Jo Bo-ah	
Galaxy Fan Party @Home	2020	Seo Kyung-hwan	
PUBG Mobile X Blackpink "Fun Match"	2020	None	
25th SBS Gayo Daejeon in Daegu "The Wonder Year"	2020	Boom, Lee Na-eun	
30th Seoul Music Awards	2021	Shin Dong-yup, Choi Soo-young	
Dyson Product Launch Event	2021	None	
TUDUM: A Netflix Global Fan Event	2021	Kai	
XR LIVE Aespa Special Event "Party-On"	2021	None	
Aespa FAN MEETING "MY SYNK. aespa"	2022	None	
Star Year-End Night	2023	None	

== Music videos ==
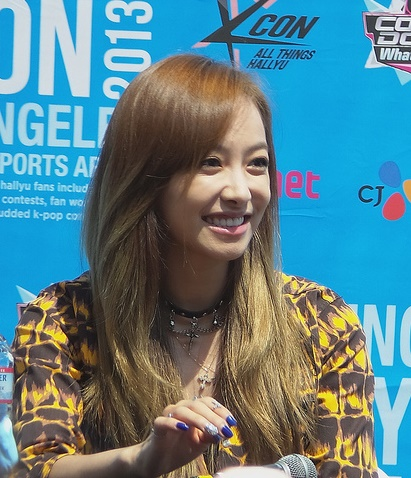
Kim appears alongside Victoria Song in the video for "Let You Go".

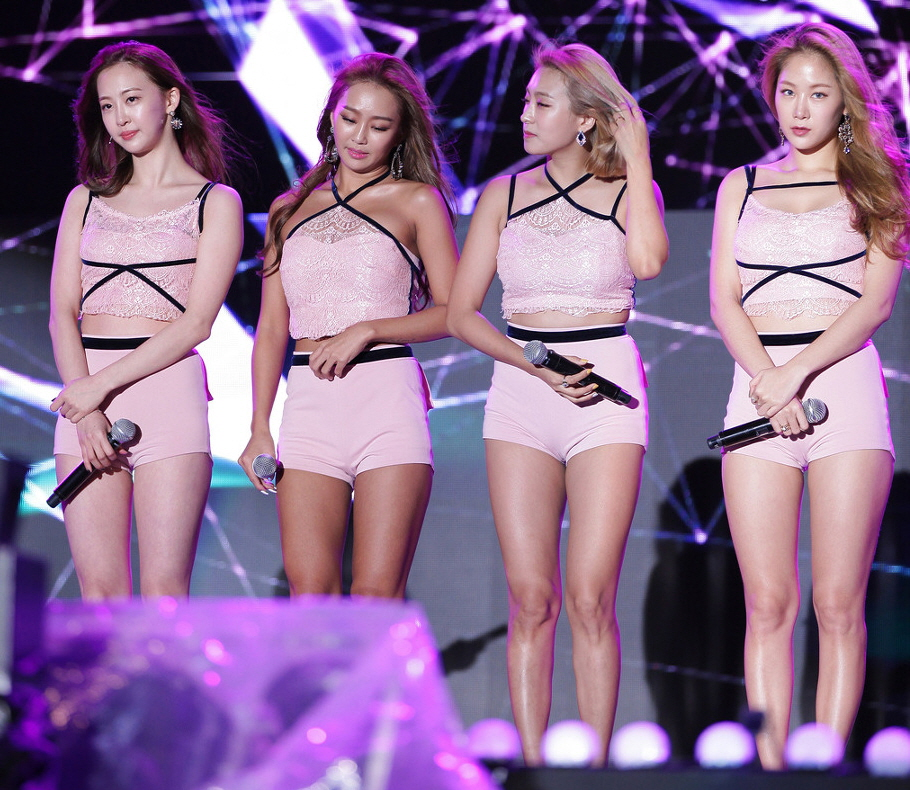
Heechul plays Sistar's love interest in the video for "Shady Girl"

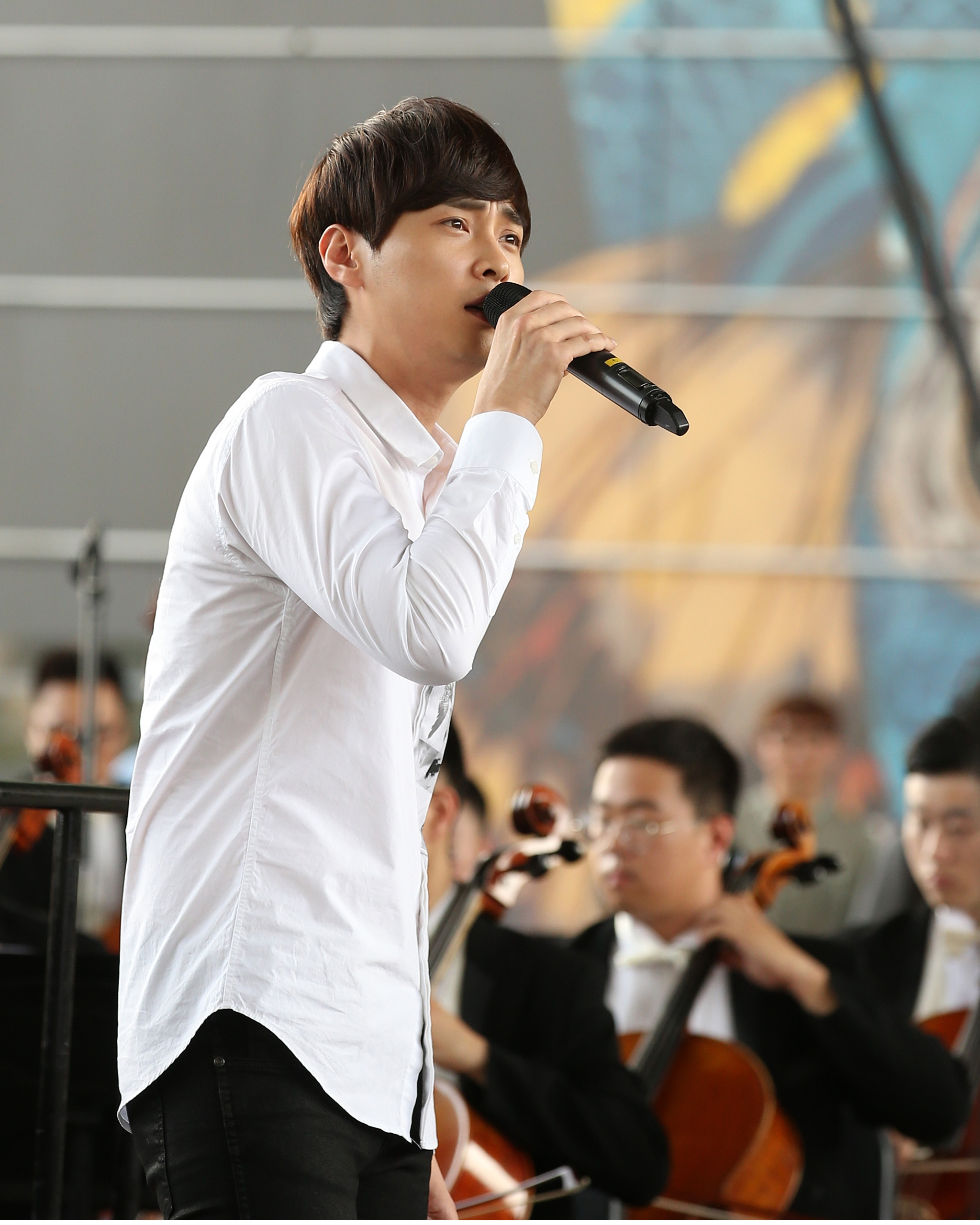
Kim collaborated with Min Kyung-hoon for "Sweet Dream", "Falling Blossoms" and "Hanryang".

Music videos
Title	Year	Credited as				Artist(s)	Description	Ref.
Title	Year	Actor	Singer	Director	Screenwriter	Artist(s)	Description	Ref.
"Flying Girl"	2007	Yes	No	No	No	Magolpy	The video shows a girl, played by Kim Hyang-gi, who is watching street performers, including Kim Hee-chul who acts as a puppeteer. Park Yoo-chun, Kangin, Shindong, Joon Park, Kim Jang-hoon and Eru also appear as other street performers. They later join the girl as accompanists in her performance.	
"Let You Go"	2010	Yes	No	No	No	TRAX	Kim Hee-chul and f(x)'s Victoria star in the music video as a couple who are going through their daily lives after experiencing a break-up.	
"King Wang Zzang"	2010	Yes	Yes	No	No	Defconn feat. Kim Hee-chul	It combines footage from the recording studio and concert events, interspersed with clips of Defconn riding a motorcycle.	
"Shady Girl"	2010	Yes	No	No	No	Sistar	The music video is a parody of an avatar blind date, (Note: In an "avatar blind date", one person attending is receiving instructions for how to act through an earpiece. The concept is inspired by the technology shown in the film Avatar, which allows people to remotely control another body. It was popularised by the variety show Hot Brothers which aired on MBC TV in 2010.) and Kim Hee-chul acts as the avatar of comedian Kim Kyung-jin. At the end of the video, Kim Hee-chul rebels against Kim Kyung-jin and refuses to be his avatar any longer.	
"Close Ur Mouth"	2011	Yes	Yes	Yes	Yes	M&D	The video incorporates the long take filming technique, in which Kim walks down corridors but keeps being interrupted by other people. A large number of guests such as Simon D, Miss A's Jia, F.T. Island's Lee Hong-gi and Choi Jong-hoon, Beast's Yong Jun-hyung, and comedian Kim Kyung-jin appeared in the music video.	
"Breakups are So Like Me"	2011	Yes	Yes	No	No	Kim Hee-chul with Kim Jang-hoon	The music video showcases clips of Kim Hee-chul and Kim Jang-hoon at the recording studio and them singing against a white wall. The song and its music video were released on the day before Kim Hee-chul enlisted in the military.	
"Open The Door"	2013	Yes	No	No	No	Im Chang-jung	The music video portrays Im with a special power that makes people become repentant of their wrongdoings when he stares at them. It includes cameo appearance of various artists, including Kim who dances with Im in front of the Korea National Assembly Proceeding Hall.	
"You Are A Miracle"	2013	Yes	Yes	No	No	Various Artists	It shows footage of various artists during recording of the song. The collaboration song is a friendship project for 2013 SBS Gayo Daejeon and has 125 participating singers, including Kim. All proceeds from the song and its music video are donated through SBS's charity channel.	
"Shall We Dance With Dr. Lim"	2014	Yes	No	No	No	Im Chang-jung feat. LE, Epaksa	The music video's concept is to encourage people to smile and promote peacemaking. It includes cameo appearances of many artists including Kim, who dances with Im in the video.	
"I Wish"	2015	Yes	Yes	Yes	Yes	M&D	The music video features Kim as a selfish boyfriend, who frequently abandons his girlfriend, plays by GFriend's Yerin, on their dates to be with his other friends. He eventually straightens up and celebrates their relationship anniversary by giving her a couple ring and a kiss.	
"Narcissus"	2016	No	Yes	Yes	Yes	M&D	Kim does not appear in the music video but his vocals are still heard. The music video begins from a first person perspective as if the viewer is having a relationship with Kim Jin-kyung. It changes to a third person perspective halfway through the video and showcases that they have broken up, with her showing sadness as she visits their old dating spots.	
"Ulsanbawi"	2016	Yes	Yes	Yes	Yes	Kim Heechul & Kim Jungmo	The music video features Kim Hee-chul as a fan of DIA's member Jung Chae-yeon. He is happy when he is able to meet her at a fansign event and she eventually watches his busking performance with his friends. It is later revealed that it was just a dream and Jung remains a celebrity who he can only see on television.	
"Sweet Dream"	2016	Yes	Yes	No	No	Universe Cowards	The music video portrays Kim as a high school student who has a crush on Momo Hirai but she only has eyes for his best friend, who is played by Min Kyung-hoon. It is revealed at the end of the video that Min had been harboring feelings for Kim instead. The music video presents LGBT issues to viewers in a lighthearted manner.	
"Melody"	2016	No	Yes	No	No	Eve feat. Kim Hee-chul	Kim does not appear in the music video, but his vocals are still heard. Eve are shown performing in a warehouse while a man, portrayed by SS501's Kim Kyu-jong, and a woman are trying to turn off voices in their head.	
"Charm of Life"	2017	Yes	Yes	No	No	Kim Hee-chul with Shindong, Eunhyuk, Solar	The music video has Kim cosplaying as the rapper Nucksal, Shindong as Killagramz, and Eunhyuk as Namolla Family's Go Jang-hwan. Nucksal and Killagramz appear in the music video as well, showing the similarities between their looks. Solar only appears in television screens in the video.	
"Falling Blossoms"	2018	Yes	Yes	No	Yes	Universe Cowards	Min Kyung-hoon acts as the head of the family in lieu of his father and developmentally disabled older brother, portrayed by Kim, but runs into trouble with gang members while trying to help his mother (Park Mi-sun) and brother. The gang beats Kim up in front of his teacher (Fromis 9's Roh Ji-sun) to get to Min. Min carries out revenge but it only ends up with Kim dying in the process.	
"Old Movie"	2019	Yes	Yes	No	Yes	Kim Hee-chul	Kim and Park Yoo-na portray a couple who have just broken up, and the contrast between their way of handling it. When Kim tries to win Park back at the end of the video, she appears to have already moved on.	
"White Winter"	2019	Yes	Yes	No	Yes	Kim Hee-chul with Lee Soo-geun	Kim and Lee Soo-geun act as new artists with the stage name Woojoo Jjokkomi, who meet their seniors Itzy at a dress rehearsal of a music program. The duo manage to impress Itzy with their performance, and receive a standing ovation from the group. The music video also includes a cameo by Shindong, who plays a television director.	
"Hanryang"	2020	Yes	Yes	No	No	Universe Hipsters feat. BIBI	The music video was filmed at the Korean Folk Village and heavily featured Korean traditional element such as traditional garments hanbok, jeogori and satgat, mapae; the traditional horse requisition tablet, gama; the traditional sedan chair, lion masks, and pungmul performances. Ateez made cameo appearance in the video by dancing to the song's chorus.	
"SsakSsakYi"	2021	Yes	Yes	No	No	Cast Members of Knowing Bros	The video has a cheerful, family-friendly aesthetic: bright colors, friendly characters (parents, grandparents, teachers, kids). The aim is to make the message about cleanliness, hygiene, mutual kindness. In the music video, Heechul appears on-screen, playing several playful "character-roles." His roles in the video include "older sister," "a friend," and even "a dog." His involvement reflects the lighthearted, child-friendly, fun vibe of the video.	
"Don't U Turn"	2021	Yes	No	No	No	Park Goon	The official music video uses colorful, retro-pop sets and coordinated choreography; Park Goon appears in several showy suits and performs with backup dancers in playful staged scenes (dance routines, closeups, and lighthearted performance shots). Kim Heechul is supporting actor/participant in the video.	

== See also ==
- Super Junior filmography
- Super Junior videography
