= List of works by Sung Si-kyung =

South Korean artist discography

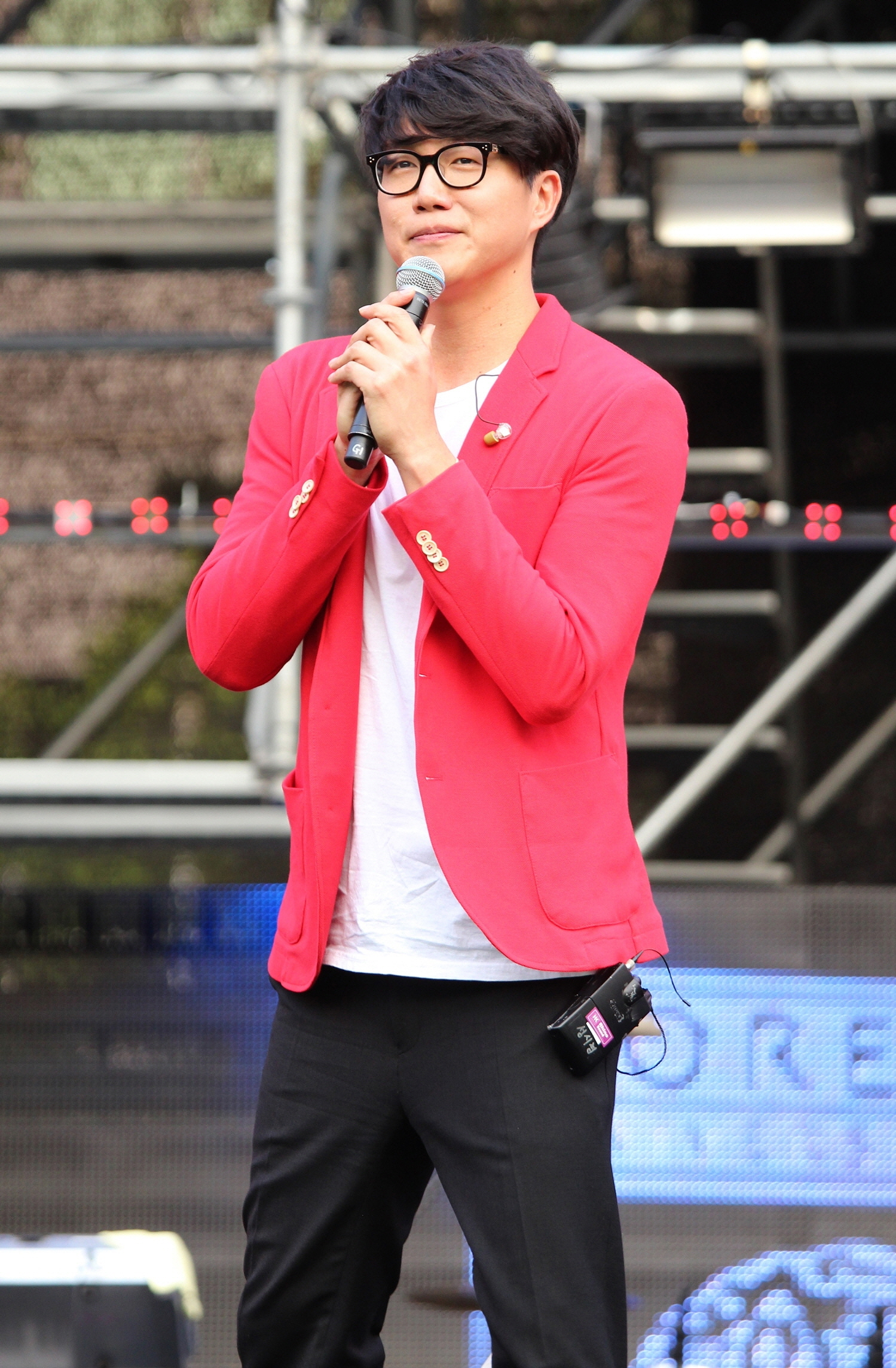
Sung on May 30, 2014

This is a list of works by South Korean singer Sung Si-kyung.

== Albums ==
=== Studio albums ===
Title	Album details	Peak chart positions			Sales
Title	Album details	KOR RIAK	KOR Gaon	JPN	Sales
Like the First Time (처음처럼)	Released: April 19, 2001 (KOR); Label: Dream Music; Formats: CD, cassette	9	—	—	KOR: 375,366
Melodie D'Amour	Released: July 18, 2002 (KOR); Label: Dream Music; Formats: CD, cassette	2	86	—	KOR: 448,533
Double Life; The Other Side	Released: October 16, 2003 (KOR); Label: Mutu Entertainment; Formats: CD, cassette	3	—	—	KOR: 194,223
I Want to Dream Again (다시 꿈꾸고 싶다)	Released: April 7, 2005 (KOR); Label: Mutu Entertainment; Formats: CD, cassette	2	—	—	KOR: 81,424
The Ballads	Released: October 10, 2006 (KOR); Label: Jelowon Interactive; Formats: CD, cassette	3	—	—	KOR: 110,976
Here, In My Heart (여기 내 맘속에)	Released: November 24, 2008 (KOR); Label: Jellyfish Entertainment; Formats: CD, cassette	N/A	5	—	KOR: 5,013
The First (처음)	Released: September 15, 2011 (KOR); Label: Jellyfish Entertainment; Formats: CD, digital download	N/A	1	—	KOR: 44,933
Drama	Released: December 20, 2017 (JPN); Label: Avex Trax; Formats: CD, digital download	N/A	—	23	JPN: 5,422
You Are Here (君がいるよ)	Released: November 21, 2018 (JPN); Label: Victor Entertainment; Formats: CD, digital download	N/A	—	14	JPN: 5,804
You Can Change My Life	Released: February 3, 2021 (JPN); Label: Victor Entertainment; Formats: CD, digital download	N/A	—	26	JPN: 1,799
Siot (시옷)	Released: May 21, 2021 (KOR); Label: SSK; Formats: CD, LP, digital download	N/A	7	—	KOR: 26,279
Konna ni Kimi wo (こんなに君を)	Released: November 22, 2023 (JPN); Label: King Records; Formats: CD, digital download	N/A	—	26	JPN: 2,169
"—" denotes album did not chart or was not released in that region.

=== Cover albums ===
Title	Album details	Peak chart positions		Sales
Title	Album details	KOR RIAK	KOR Gaon	Sales
Try to Remember	Released: May 27, 2003; Label: CJ Music; Format: CD, cassette	14	—	KOR: 73,988
The Blue Night's Dream	Released: May 20, 2004; Label: Mutu Entertainment; Format: CD, cassette	3	—	KOR: 100,818
Winter Wonderland	Released: December 8, 2014; Label: Jellyfish Entertainment; Format: CD, digital download	—N/a	2	KOR: 13,966
"—" denotes album did not chart or was not released in that region.

== Extended plays ==
Title	EP details	Peak chart positions	Sales
Title	EP details	JPN	Sales
Shiawase no Katachi (しあわせのかたち)	Released: September 17, 2025; Label: King Records; Formats: CD, digital	31	JPN: 2,051
Love	Released: September 30, 2026; Label: King Records; Formats: CD, digital	31	JPN: 1,926

== Singles ==
=== Korean singles ===
Title	Year	Peak chart positions	Sales	Album
Title	Year	KOR	Sales	Album
"The Road to Me" (내게 오는 길)	2001	—N/a	KOR: 209,111	Like the First Time
"Like the First Time" (처음처럼)	2001	—N/a		Like the First Time
"We Make a Good Pair" (우린 제법 잘 어울려요)	2002	—N/a		Melodie D'Amour
"You Touched My Heart" (넌 감동이었어)	2002	—N/a		Melodie D'Amour
"Please Remember" (외워 두세요)	2003	—N/a		Double Life; The Other Side
"Not Have the Heart" (차마)	2003	—N/a		Double Life; The Other Side
"Take Care" (잘 지내나요)	2005	—N/a		I Want to Dream Again
"Can We Start Again" (다시 시작해도 될까요)	2005	—N/a		I Want to Dream Again
"On the Street" (거리에서)	2006	—N/a	KOR: 631,297	The Ballads
"That Time, That Place" (그 자리에 그 시간에)	2006	—N/a		The Ballads
"Parting Once Again" (한번 더 이별)	2007	—N/a		Here in My Heart
"To Love" (사랑하는 일)	2008	—N/a		Here in My Heart
"Here in My Heart" (여기, 내 맘속에)	2008	—N/a		Here in My Heart
"Goodbye My Love" (안녕 나의 사랑)	2008	—N/a		Here in My Heart
"Christmas Time" (with Park Hyo-shin, Seo In-guk, Brian Joo, Lisa, Park Hak-ki, Kim Hyeong-jung, Kyun Woo)	2010	25		Jelly Christmas
"It's You" (그대네요) (with IU)	2010	1	KOR: 1,593,893	The First
"The First" (처음)	2011	18	KOR: 636,554	The First
"Even Now" (난 좋아)	2011	3	KOR: 1,903,567	The First
"Christmas for All" (모두에게 크리스마스) (with Brian Joo, Seo In-guk, Park Hak-ki, Park Jang-hyun, Hwang Project)	2011	27	KOR: 342,235	Jelly Christmas 2011
"Because It's Christmas" (크리스마스니까) (with Park Hyo-shin, Lee Seok-hoon, Seo In Guk, VIXX)	2012	1	KOR: 1,386,091	Jelly Christmas 2012
"What Should I Do Tomorrow" (내일 할 일) (with Yoon Jong-shin)	2013	17	KOR: 520,756	His Walk of Life 2013 Yoon Jong-shin
"Winter Confession" (겨울 고백) (with VIXX, Park Hyo-shin, Seo In-guk, Little Sister)	2013	1	KOR: 806,536	Jelly Christmas 2013
"Winter Wonderland"	2014	19	KOR: 232,802	Winter Wonderland
"Don't Forget" (잊지 말기로 해) (with Kwon Jin-ah)	2014	1	KOR: 586,405	Winter Wonderland
"Then I Wonder" (그런걸까) (with Kim Kwang-seok)	2015	29		Non-album single
"Andromeda" (안드로메다) (with Jung Yumi)	2016	—		Kang Seung-won Making Project
"Holding on to You" (나의 밤 나의 너)	2017	6		Non-album single
"I Still" (뻔한 이별) (with Soyou)	2017	6		Re:Born
"Eternally" (영원히)	2018	90		Non-album single
"You" (늘 그대) (with Yang Hee-eun)	2018	93		Unexpected Meeting #9
"First Winter" (첫 겨울이니까) (with IU)	2019	3		Siot
"And We Go"	2020	70		Siot
"Lovesick"	2022	49		Non-album singles
"Alley" (골목길) (with Lee Hi)	2023	96		Non-album singles
"Go for a Walk" (산책)	2024	69		Non-album singles
"Day Dream" (나의 하루처럼)	2026	129		Non-album singles
"—" denotes release did not chart.

=== Japanese singles ===
Title	Year	Peak chart positions	Album
Title	Year	JPN	Album
"If You Are Happy, I'll Be by Your Side" (幸せならそばにある)	2018	16	You Are Here

== Soundtrack appearances ==
Title	Year	Peak chart positions	Sales	Album
Title	Year	KOR	Sales	Album
희재 (Hui Jae), 아날로그 (Analogue)	2003	—		Scent of Love OST
"Since That Day" (그 날 이후로)	2004	—		First Love of a Royal Prince OST
"The Season Returns" (계절이 돌아오듯이)	2006	—		Spring Waltz OST
"Goodbye My Love" (안녕 나의 사랑)	2008	—		You Are My Destiny OST
"Love Love" (연연)	2008	—		Worlds Within OST
"Dazzling Proposal" (눈부신 고백)	2010	—		Queen of Reversals OST
"You're My Spring" (너는 나의 봄이다)	2010	2	KOR: 1,359,251	Secret Garden OST
"The Blue Night of Jeju Island" (제주도의 푸른밤)	2011	—		Lie to Me OST
"One Love" (한번의 사랑)	2011	8	KOR: 714,330	A Thousand Days' Promise OST
"The Place Where I Live" (내가 살아갈 곳)	2012	49		Ohlala Couple OST
"To You" (너에게)	2013	5	KOR: 899,622	Reply 1994 OST
"Every Moment Of You" (너의 모든 순간)	2014	2	KOR: 1,260,644	My Love from the Star OST
"Fondly, Goodbye" (다정하게, 안녕히)	2016	2		Love in the Moonlight OST
"Somewhere Someday" (어디선가 언젠가)	2016	11		The Legend of the Blue Sea OST
"If I Could Be By Your Side" (니 곁이라면)	2019	197		The Crowned Clown OST
"Leaning On You" (비스듬히 너에게)	2020	26		Tale of the Nine Tailed OST
"If You Stay By My Side" (곁에 있어준다면)	2021	189		Snowdrop OST
"For a Long Time" (오랫동안)	2022	105		Curtain Call OST

== Filmography ==
=== Television dramas ===
Year	Title	Role	Ref.
2002	We Are Dating Now	Han Jae-young	
2003	Punch	Jo Sung-woo	
2005	Banjun Drama	Sung Si-kyung	
2007	High Kick!	Sung Si-kyung (cameo)	
2012	My Husband Got a Family	Sung Si-kaeng (cameo)	
2017	Borg Mom	Do Hye's husband's boyfriend (cameo)	
2018	Solitary Gourmet	Businessman (cameo)	

=== Host ===
Year	Award	Co-Host
2003	Music Camp	with Shin Ae
2012	KBS Song Festival	with Yoona, Jung Yong-hwa
2013	SBS Gayo Daejeon	with Sandara Park, Kim Heechul
2014	Harmony	with Lee Ji-ae
2014	Infinite Dream	Bae Suzy
2014	KBS Entertainment Awards	with Shin Dong-yup, You Hee-yeol
2015	KBS Entertainment Awards	with Shin Dong-yup, Seolhyun
2017	31st Golden Disc Awards (Day 2)	with Kang Sora
2018	32nd Golden Disc Awards (Day 2)	with Kang Sora
2019	33rd Golden Disc Awards (Day 2)	with Kang Sora
2020	34th Golden Disc Awards (Day 1)	with Lee Da-hee
2021	35th Golden Disc Awards (Day 2)	with Lee Da-hee
2021	2021 KBS Drama Awards	with Lee Do-hyun, Kim So-hyun
2022	36th Golden Disc Awards	with Lee Da-hee and Lee Seung-gi
2023	37th Golden Disc Awards	with Lee Da-hee, Park So-dam and Nichkhun
2024	38th Golden Disc Awards	with Cha Eun-woo
2025	39th Golden Disc Awards	with Cha Eun-woo and Moon Ga-young
2026	40th Golden Disc Awards	with Moon Ga-young

=== Television shows ===
Year	Title	Remarks
2001–2002	Love Mansae	Member
2008	Help Me! Cooking Box	Host
2011	Superstar K3	Special Judge
2011	Great Birth	Judge
2012	Mydol	Special Judge
2012–2013	Happy Sunday – 1 Night 2 Days	Fixed Member Season 2
2014	Rules of Society	Rules of Society in New York (narrated)
2014–2015	My Young Tutor	English Tutor (ep. 1–16)
2014–2017	What shall we eat today	Host
2015	Dating Alone	Host
2015	Superstar K7	Judge
2015	Do It Your Way	Host
2016–2017	Duet Song Festival	Host
2016	Vocal War: God's Voice	Host
2016–2019; 2022–present	Battle Trip	Host (ep. 1–158)
2017	My Last 48 Hours	Host
2017	I Came Alone	Host
2017	10 Years Gap	Host
2018	Lunch Time	Host
2018	Snail Hotel	Host
2019	Show! Audio Jockey	DJ
2019	Love Me Actually	Host
2020	On & Off	Cast Member
2020	The Voice Of Korea 2020	Vocal Coach
2020	Red-Cheeked Ramyun Lab	Host
2020	There Is No House for Us in Seoul	Host
2020	Folk Us	Judge
2021	On & Off 2	Cast Member
2021	Crazy Recipe Adventure	Main Cast
2021	The Demonstration Museum	Host
2021	With God	Host
2021	Baek Jong-won Class	Host with Baek Jong-won
2021	With God Season 2	Host
2021	Joseon Top Singer	judges
2021	Along with the Gods 2	Host
2021	Love Mafia	Host
2022	Along with the Gods 3	Host
2022	Star Birth	Star maker
2022	Sorry for Marriage	Host
2022	Sung Si-kyung Concert with Friends	Main Cast

=== Web shows ===
Year	Title	Role	Notes	Ref.
2022	Love Mafia	Host		
2022	Feeling	Host	TikTok Stage On Air	
2023	Risqué Business Japan	Host	Netflix	
2025	K-foodie meets J-foodie	Host	Netflix	

=== Talk Shows ===
Year	Title	Remarks
2005	Romance Comics	Host
2005	Mnet WIDE NEWS – Hug & Romance	Host
2013–2015	Witch Hunt	Host
2014	Spokesman	Host
2014–2017	Non-Summit	Host

== Radio ==
Year	Network	Title
2003–2008	MBC	Blue Night with Sung Si Kyung
2011–2014	MBC	FM Music City is Sung Si Kyung
