= Chumchurum =

- Hangul: 처음처럼
- RR: cheoeumcheoreom
- MR: ch'ŏŭmch'ŏrŏm

Ch'ŏŭmch'ŏrŏm (Korean: 처음처럼), also known as Chumchurum, is a Korean expression that consists of the noun ch'ŏŭm (Korean: 처음; lit. 'the first') and the particle ch'ŏrŏm (처럼; lit. 'like'), and means like the first time. It may also refer to:

- Ch'ŏŭmch'ŏrŏm, a collection of essay by Shin Young-bok
- Chum-Churum, soju in South Korea, stem from aforesaid collection of essay Ch'ŏŭmch'ŏrŏm
- Ch'ŏŭmch'ŏrŏm, a song in the debut studio album by T-ara
- Ch'ŏŭmch'ŏrŏm, a song of debut album of the same name by Sung Si-kyung
- Ch'ŏŭmch'ŏrŏm, a soundtrack of Romance Zero by Lee Tae-sung
- Ch'ŏŭmch'ŏrŏm, a soundtrack of I Do, I Do by Kim Tae-hyung

== See also ==
- arche
