= First Winter (song) =

Single by Sung Si-kyung and IU
- Language: Korean
- Released: December 9, 2019
- Genre: Ballad
- Length: 4:00
- Label: SK Jaewon; Kakao M
- Songwriter: Kyuho Lee
- Producer: Gang Hwa-seong

Sung Si-kyung singles chronology
"You" (2018)	"First Winter" (2019)	"You Can Change My Life" (2020)

IU singles chronology
" Blueming" (2019)	"First Winter" (2019)	"Give You My Heart" (2020)

Music video
- "First Winter" on YouTube

"First Winter" (Korean: 첫 겨울이니까; RR: cheot gyeourinikka) is a duet recorded by South Korean singers Sung Si-kyung and IU. It was released as a digital single on December 9, 2019, by SK Jaewon Co. and Kakao M.

== Background ==
On December 5, Sung Si-kyung's agency stated, "Sung Si Kyung's new digital single, which is set for release on December 9, will feature IU." The digital single titled "First Winter". Sung Si Kyung and IU worked together in 2010 on the song "It's You," making this their first collaboration in over nine years.

== Track listing ==
No.	Title	Lyrics	Music	Length
1.	"First Winter" (첫 겨울이니까)	Kyuho Lee	Gang Hwa-seong	4:00
2.	"First Winter" (Instrumental)		Gang Hwa-seong	4:00
Total length:				8:00

== Chart performance ==
The song debuted at number 3 on South Korea's Gaon Digital Chart for the chart issue dated December 8–14, 2019

== Charts ==
Chart (2019)	Peak position
South Korea (Gaon)	3
South Korea (K-pop Hot 100)	11

== Accolades ==
Awards for "First Winter"
Year	Organization	Award	Result	Ref.
2020	Mnet Asian Music Awards	Best Collaboration	Nominated	
2020	Mnet Asian Music Awards	Song of the Year	Nominated	
