= We Got Divorced =

South Korean television series

- Genre: Reality television
- Presented by: Shin Dong-yup; Kim Won-hee
- Country of origin: South Korea
- Original language: Korean
- No. of seasons: 2
- No. of episodes: Season 1: 13; Season 2: 12 + 1 special

Production
- Production location: South Korea
- Running time: 120 minutes

Original release
- Network: TV Chosun
- Release: November 20, 2020 – July 1, 2022

We Got Divorced (Korean: 우리 이혼했어요) is a South Korean reality television show that aired on TV Chosun.

Season 1 began on November 20, 2020, and ended on February 15, 2021 at 13 episodes, and the show was expected to return for Season 2 by fall 2021. Season 2 aired on Fridays starting April 8, 2022 and ended on July 1, 2022.

== Airtime ==
Air date	Airtime
November 20 – December 25, 2020	Fridays at 10:00 PM KST
January 4 – February 15, 2021	Mondays at 10:00 PM KST
April 8 – July 1, 2022	Fridays at 10:00 PM KST

== Overview ==
It is a "real time drama" reality show that features divorced celebrity couples reuniting through the show, and they spend some time together by themselves.

== Cast ==
=== Studio ===
==== Hosts ====
- Shin Dong-yup (Season 1-2)
- Kim Won-hee (Season 1-2)

==== Guests ====
Season 1

- Kim Sae-rom (Episode 2-13)
- Yang Jae-jin (Episode 1-4)
- Jeong Ga-eun (Episode 1)
- Jang Su-won (Sechs Kies) (Episode 5-6)

Season 2

- Kim Sae-rom
- Choi Gogi (Episode 3)
- Yoo Ggaenip (Episode 3)

=== Divorced Couples ===
==== Season 1 ====
- Lee Young-ha – Sunwoo Eun-sook (Episode 1-13)
  - Married from 1981 to 2007
- Choi Gogi – Yoo Ggaenip (Episode 1-13)
  - Married from 2016 to 2020
- Park Jae-hoon – Park Hye-young (Episode 3-9)
  - Married from 2007 to 2015
- Lee Ha-neul (DJ DOC) – Park Yoo-sun (Episode 6-13)
  - Married from 2018 to 2020
- Park Se-hyeok – Kim Yu-min (Episode 10-13)
  - Married from 2018 to 2019
- Kim Dong-sung – In Min-jeong (Episode 11)
  - Kim was married from 2004 to 2018
  - In is Kim's current girlfriend; she was also divorced in 2014

==== Season 2 ====
- Eli Kim – Ji Yeon-soo (Episode 1-12)
  - Married from 2014 to 2020
- Na Han-il – Yoo Hye-young (Episode 1-12)
  - Married from 1989 to 1998, and re-married from 2002 to 2015
  - Na had re-married in 2018, to Jeong Eun-sook, but the two divorced in 2020
- Jo Sung-min – Jang Ga-hyun (Episode 5-12)
  - Married from 2000 to 2020

== Aftermath ==
On June 2, 2021, it was confirmed by Choi Gogi, one of the participating cast of the show, that he is currently dating one of the writers of the show. The same year on August 12, Choi confirmed through his Instagram update that they have broken up.

== Ratings ==
=== Season 1 ===
Season 1

Average TV viewership ratings
Ep.	Original broadcast date	Average audience share (Nielsen Korea)			
Ep.	Original broadcast date	Nationwide		Seoul	
Ep.	Original broadcast date	Part 1	Part 2	Part 1	Part 2
1	November 20, 2020	8.923%	8.995%	9.148%	10.205%
2	November 27, 2020	5.997%	9.288%	6.195%	9.618%
3	December 4, 2020	6.676%	8.978%	6.436%	9.151%
4	December 11, 2020	5.290%	8.494%	5.421%	8.660%
5	December 18, 2020	6.404%	8.878%	7.190%	8.981%
6	December 25, 2020	6.159%	8.174%	6.116%	8.026%
7	January 4, 2021	4.841%	6.442%	5.126%	6.617%
8	January 11, 2021	6.666%	7.382%	6.598%	7.994%
9	January 18, 2021	6.424%	8.147%	6.882%	8.853%
10	January 25, 2021	6.915%	7.407%	7.142%	7.945%
11	February 1, 2021	6.635%	6.565%	7.055%	7.366%
12	February 8, 2021	5.460%	6.893%	5.793%	7.162%
13	February 15, 2021	5.645%	8.033%	5.742%	8.273%

Season 2

Average TV viewership ratings
Ep.	Original broadcast date	Average audience share (Nielsen Korea)			
Ep.	Original broadcast date	Nationwide		Seoul	
Ep.	Original broadcast date	Part 1	Part 2	Part 1	Part 2
1	April 8, 2022	3.878%	6.677%	3.898%	6.796%
2	April 15, 2022	6.520%	6.690%	6.241%	6.323%
3	April 22, 2022	6.934%		7.056%	
4	April 29, 2022	6.962%		6.337%	
5	May 6, 2022	6.331%		6.295%	
6	May 13, 2022	6.668%		6.080%	
7	May 20, 2022	6.029%		5.464%	
8	May 27, 2022	6.675%		6.334%	
9	June 3, 2022	6.607%		5.891%	
Special	June 10, 2022	3.212%		2.978%	
10	June 17, 2022	6.338%		6.207%	
11	June 24, 2022	6.726%		5.911%	
12	July 1, 2022	7.072%		6.760%	

Notes

- In the tables above, the blue numbers represent the lowest ratings and the red numbers represent the highest ratings.
- Ratings do not include commercial time, which regular ratings usually do.
