= On & Off (TV series) =

South Korean television program

- Promotional poster for season 2
- Genre: Reality television Talk Show
- Starring: See below
- Country of origin: South Korea
- Original language: Korean
- No. of seasons: 2
- No. of episodes: 45

Production
- Executive producers: Jung Hyo-min (Season 1); Shin Chan-yang (Season 2)
- Production location: South Korea
- Running time: 60–120 minutes

Original release
- Network: tvN
- Release: May 2, 2020 – May 25, 2021

On & Off (Korean: 온앤오프; or On and Off) is a South Korean television program that aired on tvN.

Season 1 of the program aired on Saturdays, from May 2 to December 5, 2020.

Season 2 of the program aired on Tuesdays, from February 16 to May 25, 2021.

== Airtime ==
Season	Episodes	Air date	Airtime
1	31	May 2 – December 5, 2020	Saturdays at 10:40 PM KST
2	14	February 16 – May 25, 2021	Tuesdays at 10:30 PM KST

== Overview ==
It is a show of personal documentary, where celebrities share their "On" (busy working daily life) and/or "Off" (private/at home) moments of their lives. These moments are observed and commented.

== Cast ==
=== Season 1 ===
- Sung Si-kyung
- Jo Se-ho
- Kim Min-ah

=== Season 2 ===
- Uhm Jung-hwa
- Sung Si-kyung
- Nucksal
- Yoon Park
- Choa

== Episodes ==
- In the ratings below, the highest rating for the show will be in red and the lowest rating for the show will be in blue.

=== Season 1 (2020) ===
- No episode on October 3 due to Chuseok, and Parasite was aired instead.
List of episodes in 2020 (episode 1–31)

Ep.	Broadcast date	Celebrities' daily lives shown (Note: Also appear as studio guests (other than the 3 fixed cast members/hosts Sung Si-kyung, Jo Se-ho and Kim Min-ah))	Additional studio guest(s)	Ratings (Nielsen Korea) (Nationwide)
1	May 2	Sung Si-kyung, Jo Se-ho	Chris Lyon, Ahn Ji-young (Bolbbalgan4)	0.878%
2	May 9	Kim Min-ah, Sung Si-kyung	Chris Lyon, Ahn Ji-young (Bolbbalgan4)	1.031%
3	May 16	Ahn Ji-young (Bolbbalgan4), Kim Min-ah, Sung Si-kyung	Chris Lyon	0.843%
4	May 23	Kim Min-ah + Jo Se-ho, (Note: Special appearance by Nam Chang-hee) Sung Si-kyung, Shim Eun-woo (Note: Special voice appearance by Lee Hak-joo through phone)	Chris Lyon	2.294%
5	May 30	Solar (Mamamoo), Kim Dong-wan (Shinhwa), (Note: Special appearance by Lee Jin-hee) Kim Min-ah	Chris Lyon, Shim Eun-woo	2.135%
6	June 6	Choi Gwi-hwa, Yoona (Girls' Generation)	Chris Lyon	1.763%
7	June 13	Sung Si-kyung, (Note: Special appearances by Johan Kim (Solid) and Baek Ji-young) Hyun Woo, Hyojung (Oh My Girl) (Note: Special appearances by Oh My Girl (Seunghee, Arin))	Chris Lyon, Arin (Oh My Girl)	2.375%
8	June 20	Yubin, Gyeongree, Jo Se-ho (Note: Special appearances by Kim Min-kyung, Lee Byung-ho and Jeon Yu-seong)	Chris Lyon	1.601%
9	June 27	Solar (Mamamoo), Kim Dong-wan (Shinhwa)	Chris Lyon, Lee Elijah	1.993%
10	July 4	Sung Si-kyung, Lee Elijah	Chris Lyon	1.657%
11	July 11	Sung Si-kyung, (Note: Special appearances by the rest of the On & Off cast, Chris Lyon and Ahn Ji-young (Bolbbalgan4); special voice appearance by Yoo Yeon-seok) Stefanie Michova (Note: Special appearance by Beenzino)	Lee Elijah, Kim Dong-jun	1.886%
12	July 18	Sung Si-kyung, Kim Dong-jun (Note: Special appearance by Shin Ye-eun)	Lee Elijah, Stefanie Michova	1.918%
13	July 25	Choi Yeo-jin, Kim Min-ah, Sojin (Girl's Day) (Note: Special appearance by Lee Min-ji)	Soyou	2.319%
14	August 1	Sung Si-kyung + Kim Dong-wan (Shinhwa), Soyou (Note: Special appearance by Nicole Jung)	Sojin (Girl's Day), Uhm Jung-hwa	2.223%
15	August 8	Uhm Jung-hwa, (Note: Special appearance by Lee So-ra) Jo Se-ho	Kim Dong-wan (Shinhwa)	2.755%
16	August 15	Sung Si-kyung, (Note: Special appearances by Shin Dong-yup and Kim Jun-hyun) Shim Eun-woo	Han Bo-reum	2.366%
17	August 22	Stefanie Michova, Han Bo-reum	Choi Yeo-jin, Park Byung-eun, Shim Eun-woo	2.280%
18	August 29	Kim Min-ah, Park Byung-eun, Lee Hi (Note: Special appearance by Code Kunst)	Stefanie Michova, Choi Yeo-jin	1.927%
19	September 5	Kim Sae-ron, Stefanie Michova + Beenzino	—N/a	1.958%
20	September 12	Jang Hee-jin, (Note: Special appearance by Kim Ji-hoon) Sung Si-kyung, Stefanie Michova + Beenzino	Kim Sae-ron	2.087%
21	September 19	Hong Soo-hyun, Sung Si-kyung + Kim Dong-wan (Shinhwa), Kim Min-ah	—N/a	1.899%
22	September 26	Kim Wan-sun, Sung Si-kyung + Kim Dong-wan (Shinhwa)	Hong Soo-hyun	2.415%
23	October 10	Jiyeon (T-ara), (Note: Special appearances by T-ara (Qri, Eunjung, Hyomin) and IU) Lee Hye-sung	—N/a	2.560%
24	October 17	Sung Si-kyung, Nucksal, (Note: Special appearances by the cast of DoReMi Market) Yoon Jin-yi	Lee Hye-sung	1.368%
25	October 24	Go Ah-sung, (Note: Special appearances by Ryu Hyun-kyung, Esom and Park Hye-su) Jang Woo-hyuk (H.O.T.), Kim Min-ah	Hyojung (Oh My Girl)	1.755%
26	October 31	Song Min-ho (Winner), (Note: Special appearance by P.O (Block B)) Ivy, Solar (Mamamoo) (Note: Special appearance by Moonbyul (Mamamoo))	—N/a	1.898%
27	November 7	Haemin, (Note: Special appearance by Daniel Tudor) Koo Jun-yup (Clon), (Note: Special appearance by Shim Tae-yoon) Jo Se-ho (Note: Special appearances by Nam Chang-hee, Lee Jin-ho and Yang Se-chan)	Nucksal	2.202%
28	November 14	Son Yeon-jae, Kim Min-ah, Sung Si-kyung	Lee Hye-sung, Nucksal	2.572%
29	November 21	Nam Gyu-ri, Sunny (Girls' Generation) (Note: Special appearance by BoA)	Nucksal	2.154%
30	November 28	Lee Ji-ah, Yoon Park, (Note: Special appearance by Kwak Dong-yeon) Jukjae (Note: Special appearance by You Hee-yeol and Sam Kim)	Nucksal	2.983%
31	December 5	Jang Ye-won, (Note: Special appearance by Jang Ye-in) Ayumi, (Note: Special appearance by Jeon Hye-bin) Hwangbo (Note: Special appearance by Jo Se-ho)	Nucksal	1.699%

=== Season 2 (2021) ===
- No episode on April 13, and episode 1 of House on Wheels Season 2 was aired instead.
List of episodes in 2021 (episode 32–45)

Ep.	Broadcast date	Celebrities' daily lives shown (Note: Also appear as studio guests (other than the 5 fixed cast members/hosts Uhm Jung-hwa, Sung Si-kyung, Nucksal, Yoon Park and Choa))	Additional studio guest(s)	Nationwide ratings (Nielsen Korea)
32	February 16	Uhm Jung-hwa + Sung Si-kyung, Cha Chung-hwa, Choa	—N/a	2.928%
33	February 23	Park Tae-hwan, Kim Dong-kyu, (Note: Special appearances by Um Ki-joon and Yoo Byung-jae) Chungha (Note: Special appearances by Chaeyeon (DIA) and Kang Mi-na)	—N/a	2.504%
34	March 2	Han Ye-ri, Yoon Park, Park Bom	Cha Chung-hwa	1.879%
35	March 9	Sung Si-kyung, Don Spike, (Note: Special appearances by Yoo Min-sang and Han So-young) Choa	Cha Chung-hwa	2.195%
36	March 16	Han Chae-ah, Julien Kang, Cha Chung-hwa	—N/a	2.205%
37	March 23	Jiyeon (T-ara), (Note: Special appearances by T-ara (Qri, Eunjung, Hyomin)) Jessi, Sung Si-kyung + Yoon Park + Nucksal	—N/a	1.729%
38	March 30	Kim Se-jeong, (Note: Special appearance by Jihyo (Twice)) Go Won-hee (Note: Special appearance by Jeon Hye-bin)	Hani (EXID)	1.995%
39	April 6	Lee Seung-yoon, (Note: Special appearances by Jung Hong-il and Lee Mu-jin) Nam Gyu-ri, Hani (EXID) (Note: Special appearances by Cha Min-ji and Jung In-sun)	Go Won-hee, Kim Se-jeong	2.390%
40	April 20	Uhm Jung-hwa, Sung Si-kyung (Note: Special appearances by Kim Jong-kook and Haha)	Oh Yeon-seo, Lee Jeong-hyun	1.917%
41	April 27	Uee, Ock Joo-hyun	—N/a	1.901%
42	May 4	Uhm Jung-hwa + Jung Jae-hyung	—N/a	2.732%
43	May 11	Oh Yeon-seo, Lee Jeong-hyun, Shin Dong-mi	—N/a	1.675%
44	May 18	Lee So-yeon, (Note: Special appearance by Choi Yeo-jin) Yoo Su-jin, Yura (Girl's Day) (Note: Special appearance by Yoon Shi-yoon)	—N/a	2.284%
45	May 25	Sung Si-kyung, Kim Yoon-ah (Jaurim) (Note: Special appearance by Kim Hyung-kyu)	—N/a	2.096%

== Awards and nominations ==
Year	Award	Category	Recipient(s)	Result	Ref.
2021	Korea First Brand Awards	Best Observation Variety Program Award	On & Off	Won	
