= Kim Won-hee =

South Korean entertainer (born 1972)

- Born: June 9, 1972 (age 54); Mapo District, Seoul, South Korea
- Occupations: Television presenter; actress
- Years active: 1992–present
- Agent(s): Sky E&M

Korean name
- Hangul: 김원희
- Hanja: 金元嬉
- RR: Gim Wonhui
- MR: Kim Wŏnhŭi

Kim Won-hee (Korean: 김원희; born June 9, 1972) is a South Korean television presenter and actress. She began her career in acting, starring in television series such as Queen (1999), The Thief's Daughter (2000), Love Needs a Miracle (2005) and Don't Ask Me About the Past (2008), as well as the films Oh! LaLa Sisters (2002), Marrying the Mafia II (2005), Marrying the Mafia III (2006) and Swindler in My Mom's House (2007). In recent years, Kim has become more active with variety and talk shows, notably Come to Play which she and Yoo Jae-suk hosted for eight years.

== Filmography ==
=== Film ===
Year	Title	Role
1992	An Unlikely Farewell (short film)	Sook-yi
1994	The Man Who Cannot Kiss	Yoo Mi-na
1996	Piano Man	Doctor
1998	Extra	Kang Bo-ra
2002	Oh! LaLa Sisters	Jang Mi-ok
2003	North Korean Guys	Woman at homestay (cameo)
2004	Father and Son: The Story of Mencius	Piggy mother (cameo)
2005	Marrying the Mafia II	Kim Jin-kyung
2006	Marrying the Mafia III	Kim Jin-kyung/Park Jin-sook
2006	Who Slept with Her?	Jae-seong's mother (cameo)
2007	Swindler in My Mom's House	Hye-ju

=== Television series ===
Year	Title	Role	Network
1991	Mudongine House		MBC
1994	The Moon of Seoul	Ho-soon	MBC
1994	Way of Living: Woman	Choi Yoon-na	SBS
1995	Jang Hui-bin	Queen Inhyeon	SBS
1995	LA Arirang		SBS
1996	Wealthy Yu-chun	Song Cho-won	SBS
1996	Im Kkeokjeong	Hwang Woon-chong	SBS
1997	Palace of Dreams	Heo Mi-kang	SBS
1997	OK Ranch		SBS
1997	Miss & Mister		SBS
1998	The Barefooted Youth		KBS2
1998	Hong Gil-dong	Kim In-ok	SBS
1998	Eun-shil	Yang Kil-rye	SBS
1999	Queen	Kang Seung-ri	SBS
2000	The Thief's Daughter	Kim Myung-sun	SBS
2001	Honey Honey		SBS
2005	Love Needs a Miracle	Cha Bong-shim	SBS
2008	Don't Ask Me About the Past	Kwak Sun-young	OCN
2008	Things We Do That We Know; We Will Regret	(episode 4: "On a Night Sparkling with Stars")	KBS2

=== Variety/radio show ===
Year	Title	Network	Role
1998–2001	Love for Three Days	iTV	
2001–2003	Hopeful Music at Noon	MBC FM4U	DJ
2002–2009	Mystery TV: Surprise	MBC	Host
2003–2005	Korea's First Period	KBS2	Host
2004–2012	Come to Play with Yoo Jae-suk and Kim Won-hee	MBC	Host
2005–2007	Afternoon Discovery	MBC FM4U	DJ
2006–2007	Hey Hey Hey - Season 2	SBS	Host
2006–2008	3 Color Women Talk Show	MBC Dramanet	Host
2008–2009	Complaint Zero	MBC	Host
2008–2009	May I Sleep Over?	MBC	Host
2009–present	Jagiya (Honey)	SBS	Host
2009–present	Sold Out Women's Blog	Story On	Host
2010	Family Outing 2	SBS	Cast member
2010–2011	He's Just Not That into You	Mnet	Host
2011	Diet Revenge	E Channel	Host
2011–2012	Art School	Channel A	Host
2012–2013	Chatter with Kim Won-hee	Story On	Host
2012–2013	King of Anger	Channel A	Host
2013–present	살림 9단의 만물상	TV Chosun	Host
2014	King of the Game	JTBC	Host
2015	Great Recipe: Let's Go to the Mart	KBS2	Host
2020–present	TV Loaded with Love Season 3 (TV는 사랑을 싣고)	KBS2	Host
2020–present	We Got Divorced	TV Chosun	Host
2021	Falling for Korea - Transnational Couples	MBN	Host
2022	Groom's Class	Channel A	Host
2022	We Got Divorced 2	TV Chosun	Host

== Awards and nominations ==
Year	Award	Category	Nominated work	Result
1996	SBS Drama Awards	Netizen Popularity Award		Won
2001	SBS Drama Awards	Excellence Award, Actress		Won
2002	MBC Drama Awards	Excellence Award in Radio	Hopeful Music at Noon	Won
2003	39th Baeksang Arts Awards	Most Popular Actress (TV)	Im Kkeokjeong	Won
2004	MBC Entertainment Awards	Excellence Award in a Variety Show		Won
2005	MBC Entertainment Awards	Top Excellence Award in a Variety Show		Won
2007	43rd Baeksang Arts Awards	Best Female Variety Performer	Come to Play	Nominated
2007	MBC Entertainment Awards	Popularity Award in a Variety Show		Won
2009	SBS Entertainment Awards	Best MC		Won
2010	MBC Entertainment Awards	Special Award in a Variety Show	Come to Play	Won
2011	47th Baeksang Arts Awards	Best Female Variety Performer	Come to Play	Won
2011	MBC Entertainment Awards	PD Award		Won
2011	SBS Entertainment Awards	Netizen Popularity Award	Jagiya	Nominated
2014	SBS Entertainment Awards	Best MC	Jagiya	Won
