= TV Animal Farm =

South Korean television program

- TV 동물농장
- Country of origin: South Korea
- Original language: Korean

Production
- Production company: Seoul Broadcasting System

Original release
- Release: May 6, 2001 – present

TV Animal Farm (Korean: TV 동물농장) is a South Korean television program by network SBS that has aired since May 6, 2001. It airs on Sunday mornings at 9:30 AM, and focuses on topics relating to animals.

Episodes often focus on animals and their relationship with humans. Efforts are made to not only show cute animals, but to also educate and increase sympathy towards animals. Episodes often focus on animals as pets, but often cover topics such as animal rights and animal welfare. Other topics include pet adoption and veterinary care. When the show covers difficult topics, its producers reportedly take the approach of trying to encourage positive reform.

The show has four main panelists who comment on the topics featured in the show; these panelists have sometimes been celebrities from other fields. As of May 2024, the hosts are comedian Shin Dong-yup, actress Jeong Seon-hee, and K-pop artists Tony Ahn and Joy.

In 2020, it aired its 1000th episode. The show's investigative reporting on animal rights and welfare is considered to have had an impact on the passing of a number of pieces of relevant legislation in South Korea. The show reportedly spends additional effort to ensure that animals it features are being treated ethically.

In 2023, South Korean President Yoon Suk Yeol and First Lady Kim Keon Hee appeared on the show alongside their adopted labrador retriever.
