= Witch Hunt (South Korean talk show) =

2013 South Korean TV series

- Genre: Talk-variety
- Written by: Jung Seon-young; Jang Mi; Choi Ji-seon; Woo Ji-hoon; Park Byung-hee; Kim Gi-hyun
- Starring: Shin Dong-yup; Sung Si-kyung; Heo Ji-woong; Yoo Se-yoon
- Country of origin: South Korea
- Original language: Korean
- No. of episodes: 123

Production
- Executive producers: Kim Min-ji; Chae Seong-wook; Hong In-ki; Ahn Seong-han; Park Hyun-jung
- Running time: 70 minutes

Original release
- Network: JTBC
- Release: August 2, 2013 – December 28, 2015

Witch Hunt (Korean: 마녀사냥) is a 2013 South Korean variety talk show starring Shin Dong-yup, Sung Si-kyung, Heo Ji-woong, Yoo Se-yoon that first aired on August 2, 2013. It airs on JTBC every Friday at 23:00. This show ended on December 28, 2015.

== Hosts ==
=== Current hosts ===
Name	Hangul	Episodes
Shin Dong-yup	신동엽	1 - present
Sung Si-kyung	성시경	1 - present
Heo Ji-woong	허지웅	1 - present
Yoo Se-yoon	유세윤	34 - present

=== Former hosts ===
Name	Hangul	Episodes
Sam Hammington	샘 해밍턴	1 – 33

=== Secondary Hosts ===
Name	Job	Episodes
Han Hye-Jin	Model	1 - Present
Kwak Jung-Eun	Columnist	1 - Present
Hong Seok-Cheon	Entertainer	1 - Present

=== Episode Guest(s) ===
Episode No.	Guest(s)
1	Lizzy (Orange Caramel)
11	Jung Kyung Ho
19	Kim A-joong, Joo Won
21	Park So-Hyun
22	Narsha (Brown Eyed Girls)
26	Song Kyung-a
27	Gain
28	Lee Hyun-Yi
30	Baek Ji-Young
33	Hong Jin-Kyung
35	Ahn Jae-Wook, Lizzy (Orange Caramel)
36	Narsha (Brown Eyed Girls)
38	Kahi (After School)
39	Song Seung-heon, On Joo-Wan
47	Sojin (Girl's Day), Minah (Girl's Day), Song Kyung-a
51	Choi Yeo-Jin
52	Soyou, Hyolyn (SISTAR)
54	John Park
55	Jay Park
57	John Park, Hwayobi
