= Brain Defiler =

South Korean variety web show

- Also known as: Brain Breaker, Brainwrecker
- Hangul: 뇌절자
- RR: Noejeolja
- MR: Noejŏlja
- Genre: Entertainment; Variety
- Presented by: Kim Hee-chul, Ha Ji-won
- Country of origin: South Korea
- Original language: Korean
- No. of seasons: 2
- No. of episodes: 24

Production
- Production location: South Korea
- Running time: 15–35 minutes
- Production company: 찹찹 ChopChop

Original release
- Network: YouTube
- Release: 30 June 2024

Brain Defiler (Korean: 뇌절자; RR: Noejeolja), also known as Brain Breaker and Brainwrecker is a South Korean variety web show hosted by South Korean singer-songwriter, K-pop idol, actor, presenter and television personality Kim Hee-chul. New episodes air every Wednesday at 6 pm KST on YouTube.

== Series overview ==
| Series | Episodes | Originally released | |
| Series | Episodes | First released | Last released |
|---|---|---|---|
| 1 | 12 | 3 July 2024 | 18 September 2024 |
| 2 | 12 | 9 October 2024 | 5 January 2025 |

== Hosts ==
| Season(s) | Episode(s) | Main Host | Co-Host |
|---|---|---|---|
| 1 | 1–8 | Kim Heechul | |
| 1 | 9–12 | Kim Heechul | Lovelyz, Yoo Ji-ae |
| 2 | 1–12 | Kim Heechul | Hanwha Eagles Cheerleader, Ha Ji Won |

== Episodes ==
=== Season 1 ===
| Ep | Title | Guests | PPL | Air Date |
|---|---|---|---|---|
| 1 | Attention! The universe's big star Kim Hee-chul! Can he sell this to Pani Bottle as well? | YouTuber (Travel), Pani Bottle (Park Jae-han - 박재한) | Wonderbra | 3 July 2024 |
| 2 | Heechul Kim YouTube baby...Ggondaehee is here to get disciplined | Comedian - YouTuber, Ggondaehee (Kim Dae Hee - 김대희) | Dentiste toothpaste | 10 July 2024 |
| 3 | HeeChul didn't want to be this happy... | Who's better at Kia vs Hanwha? | Hanwha Eagles Cheerleader, Ha Jiwon and Kia Tigers Cheerleader, Lee JuEun | Fitany Gummy | 17 July 2024 |
| 4 | It's on QWER's father Kim Egg from Physical Gallery! Fiasco or Jackpot? | QWER's father, Kim Gyeran "Kim Egg"-김계란 | Casamaru Magic Scrubber | 24 July 2024 |
| 5 | The ordeal of Kim Heechul getting scolded by the fact bomber Soyou | Sistar KPop Idol, Soyou - 소유기 | Kirania Deo De Perfume Body Wash | 31 July 2024 |
| 6 | "I lead this field" - Chungju Man's declaration to competitors?! | Civil Servant - YouTuber, Chungju Man (Kim Seon-tae - 김선태) | Olhgok Peanut Butter | 7 August 2024 |
| 7 | I really like this story about Lee Sooji eating Kim Goeun's toenails | Comedian, Lee Soo Ji - 이수지 | CALO BOWL Low Sugar Rice Cooker | 14 August 2024 |
| 8 | Kim Kyoung-wook's lessons on alter ego/Hee-chul poops through his mouth | Comedian - Singer, Kim Kyung Wook "Tanaka & Kim Hong Nam" - 김경욱 | Pollack Roe Laver | 21 August 2024 |
| 9 | Cradle snatcher Kim Jong-min's girlfriend story. First reveal ever! | Variety star and Koyote,singer, Kim Jong-min - 김종민 | The Barun Songpyeon | 28 August 2024 |
| 10 | Heechul shocked by Chan Sung's married life. The first public disclosure of... | Former Pro mixed martial artist, The Korean Zombie, Jung Chan-sung - 정찬성 | Philips Nose Hair Trimmer NT1620 | 4 September 2024 |
| 11 | MZ Flirting Friendshiping VS AZ Clingirting Heechul (Surprise Guest!) | YouTuber/Influencer, Woojunging - 우정잉 | Dunst Studio Denim Jacket | 11 September 2024 |
| 12 | Super Super Youngtak does XX as soon as he wakes up?! As expected from Hee-chul's friend | Trot Singer & Songwriter, Young Tak - 영탁 | Sase Sauce Chicken | 18 September 2024 |

=== Season 2 ===
| Ep | Title | Guests | PPL | Air Date |
|---|---|---|---|---|
| 1 | Even Heechul Got Drained, Really Spicy Talk of Go Malsook and Park Minjung! | Streamers & Influencers, Go Malsook (고말숙) and Park Minjung (박민정) | Resnovae Core Impact 레스노베 | 9 October 2024 |
| 2 | To Conquer the Algorithm, NEW Gay KIM DDOLDDOL Appeared! | Gay YouTuber, DdolDdol [Kim Ban Seok (김똘똘) | Dubai Chocolates | 16 October 2024 |
| 3 | Goddesses in YouTube Shorts: Park Eun Woo and Choi Haseul | YouTubers & actresses, Park Eun Woo and Choi Haseul | NordVPN | 23 October 2024 |
| 4 | At the Center of Lotte (Mok Nagyeong), Hanwha (Ha Jiwon), and KT (Kim Jin-ah), Shout Haitai! | Cheerleaders - KT Wiz, Kim Jin-A and Lotte Giants, Mok Nag-Yeong | Fitany Diet Chocolate 피타니 라라슬림 마이너스 초콜릿 | 30 October 2024 |
| 5 | 20th Generation Jeong-suk, Possessed Taro: Little Hanna! | Dating Reality Shows' Stars, Choi Hanna (Possessed Love) and Lee Eun-Yul "Joeng-Suk" (I'm Solo) | Roborock Vacuum Mop Cleaner 로보락 Flexi Pro | 6 November 2024 |
| 6 | Best Outputs of Culinary Class Wars: Chefs Yoon Nam-no and Hwang Jin-seon! | Culinary Class Wars Chefs Yoon Nam No and Hwang Jin-seon | Heart Heart Hot Pack 하뜨하뜨 핫팩 | 13 November 2024 |
| 7 | Wednesday Colleague Ji-won vs. Friday Colleague Mi-joo, and Heechul in Between Two Girls! | Kpop Idol Lovelyz Mijoo | Oatside Oat Beverage 오트사이드 | 20 November 2024 |
| 8 | Constant Insulting: A Gathering of Heechul's Friends, JungGigo and Sleepy | Junggigo and Sleepy (rapper) | Choi Hyun-seok Han-don Hanwoo Hamburger Steak 최현석 함박스테이크 | 27 November 2024 |
| 9 | The Karina of Track and Field, Kim Min-ji Is Here at Brain Defiler! | Track and Field Athlete, Kim Min-ji | Flotte Anorak Jacket 플로트 | 4 December 2024 |
| 10 | Blinded By The Beauty of Nancy Who's The Most Beautiful In The World | Former member of Momoland, Nancy (singer) | Besties Potato Bread 베스티스 | 11 December 2024 |
| 11 | The Universe's Biggest Star Kim Heechul That Blackens Church Oppa Lee Seok-Hoon | Kpop Idol SG Wannabe, Lee Seok-hoon (singer) | Ajeongdang 아정당 | 25 December 2024 |
| 12 | Cheerleader Jiwon-ping Who Gets Hyped Whenever Her Family Appears | Suwon KT Sonicboom Cheerleaders, Kim Jeong-won and Lee Ye-bin | Chicken Man Kiyoung "Charcoal Grilled Chicken" One Piece Set | 5 January 2025 |
