= The Night the Memories Shine Bright =

South Korean television series

- Starring: Ryu Si-won; Kyeong-shil Lee; Lee Hongryul; Kim Hee-chul
- Country of origin: South Korea
- Original language: Korean
- No. of episodes: 21

Production
- Running time: 55 minutes

Original release
- Network: MBC Drama
- Release: January 6 – May 26, 2011

The Night the Memories Shine Bright (Korean: 추억이 빛나는 밤에) is a South Korean show distributed by MBC Drama. The show was aired every Thursday at 23:05.

== Format ==
Middle of the star guests on the theme of memories and stories to share with the talk show program.

== Performer ==
- Host
  - Ryu Si-won (EP 1-21)
  - Kyeong-shil Lee (EP 1-21)
  - Kim Hee-chul (EP 1–5, 8–16, 18–21)
  - Lee Hongryul (EP 3–6, 6-21)
- Special
  - Yoon Jung-soo (EP 1–7, 9)
  - Hwi-soon Park (EP 1–2)
  - Noh Hong-chul, Han Sun-hwa, Hyang-gi Jo (EP 1)
  - Hong Seo-beom (EP 1–10)
  - Yoon Bo-ra (EP 2)
  - Han Groo (EP 6)
  - Joo Young-hoon (EP 6–7)
  - Lee Kye-in (EP 2, 6–7, 9, 16–17)
  - Chun Myung-hoon (EP 12–13)

== List of episodes ==
Episode #	Air Date	Guest(s)
1	January 6, 2011	Noh Joo-hyun, Lee Young-ha
2	January 13, 2011	Yu Ji-in, Geum Bo-ra
3	January 20, 2011	Choi Min-soo, June Elizabeth Kang, Lee Byeongjin, Kim Chang Ryul, Haha
4	January 27, 2011	Choi Min-soo, June Elizabeth Kang, Lee Byeongjin, Kim Chang Ryul, Haha
5	February 3, 2011	Lee Hongryul, Lee Seong-Mi, Choi Byung-suh, Song Eun-i
6	February 10, 2011	Park Won-sook, Im Hyun-sik, Lee Kye-in
7	February 17, 2011	Park Won-sook, Im Hyun-sik, Shim Yang-hong, Hyeon Seok, Kim Ae Gyeong, Lee Geon-Ju
8	February 24, 2011	Byun Jin-sub, Lee Sang-woo, Park Nam-jung, Kim Heung-gook
9	March 3, 2011	Jeon Yeong-Rok, Hye Eun Yi, Kim Bo-yeon, Lee Kye-in
10	March 10, 2011	Kim Byeong-Jo, Choi Byung-suh, Kim Jungryul, Kim Sook
11	March 17, 2011	Kim Byeong-Jo, Choi Byung-suh, Kim Jungryul, Kim Sook, Kim Han-guk, Kim Hak-rae, Lee Kyeong-ae
12	March 24, 2011	Moon Hee-joon, Tony An, Danny Ahn, Son Ho-young, Kim Tae-woo
13	March 31, 2011	Moon Hee-joon, Tony An, Danny Ahn, Son Ho-young, Kim Tae-woo
14	April 7, 2011	Kim Soo-mi, Kim Ja-ok
15	April 14, 2011	Shin Seong-il, Um Aing-ran, Lee Sang-byuk, Kang Su-hwa
16	April 21, 2011	Choi Bool-am, Kim Sang-Sun, Kyeong-hwan Jo, Lee Kye-in
17	April 28, 2011	Jeon Won-Ju, Yoon Mun-sik, Su-na Lee, Lee Kye-in, Hwang Kwanghee
18	May 5, 2011	An Yoon-sang, Kim Hak Do, Choi Byung-suh, Nam Bo-won
19	May 12, 2011	Jung Han-yong, Wang Young-Eun, Song Seung-hwan
20	May 19, 2011	Ahn Yeon Hong, Ahn Moon Sook, Jung Woong-in, Yoon Da-hoon, Park Sang-myun
21	May 28, 2011	Park Semin, Bae Yeon-Jeong, Bae Il-Jip, Kim Young-ha

== Rating ==
In the ratings below, the highest rating for the show will be in red, and the lowest rating for the show will be in blue.

Episode #	Air Date	AGB Nielsen ratings
1	January 6, 2011	6.4%
2	January 13, 2011	6.4%
3	January 20, 2011	10.3%
4	January 27, 2011	9.7%
5	February 3, 2011	6.5%
6	February 10, 2011	11.1%
7	February 17, 2011	9.9%
8	February 24, 2011	7.3%
9	March 3, 2011	8.1%
10	March 10, 2011	8.1%
11	March 17, 2011	9.4%
12	March 24, 2011	6.8%
13	March 31, 2011	5.5%
14	April 7, 2011	7.5%
15	April 14, 2011	7.5%
16	April 21, 2011	7.5%
17	April 28, 2011	5.7%
18	May 5, 2011	5.2%
19	May 12, 2011	6.1%
20	May 19, 2011	7.6%
21	May 28, 2011	5.6%
