= Falling for Korea - Transnational Couples =

2021 South Korean television show

- Promotional poster
- Genre: Entertainment
- Created by: ABO Media; MBN Entertainment
- Presented by: Kim Won-hee
- Country of origin: South Korea
- Original language: Korean
- No. of seasons: 2
- No. of episodes: 18

Production
- Production company: ABO Media

Original release
- Network: MBN
- Release: May 28 – November 10, 2021

Falling for Korea - Transnational Couples (Korean: 한국에 반하다-국제부부) is a South Korean show. One of the runners-up of the 2021 MBN Entertainment Program Creation Contest, It premiered on MBN's Friday late prime time slot (11 PM KST) on May 28, 2021.

== Format ==
Falling for Korea - Transnational Couples invites international families living in Korea to open up about their experiences, their love of Korea, as well as some of their daily hacks about transnational marriages.

== Host ==
- Kim Won-hee (Seasons 1 and 2)
- Kim Hee-chul (Season 1)
- Yoon Shi-yoon (Season 2)

== Panel ==
- Joon Park
- Kim Jung-min
- Alberto Mondi
- Jung Ju-Ri
- Kim Ye-ryeong

== International wife ==
Cast	Country	Episode(s)
Rie Akiba	Japan	EP. 2–4
Aliona	Belarus	
Sruong Pheavy	Cambodia	
Anastasia Min	Russia	EP. 1–3, 5, 6
Eliane Nierinck	Belgium	EP. 1–8, 10–12
Megane Charvet	France	EP. 1–2, 6
Shallen Sabino	United States	EP. 1, 2, 4
Nida Turan Lee	Turkey	
Ariane Desgagnés-Leclerc	Canada	EP. 3–6
Linda Kwon	Germany	EP. 3
Liana Nikonova	Russia	EP. 4

== List of episodes ==
- In the ratings below, the highest rating for the show will be in red, and the lowest rating for the show will be in blue.
Season 1 (12 episodes)

Ep. #	Air Date	Rating
1	May 28, 2021	1.892%
2	June 4, 2021	1.631%
3	June 11, 2021	1.205%
4	June 18, 2021	1.777%
5	June 25, 2021	1.395%
6	July 2, 2021	1.341%
7	July 14, 2021	1.700%
8	July 21, 2021	1.164%
9	July 28, 2021	1.343%
10	August 4, 2021	1.424%
11	August 11, 2021	1.325%
12	August 18, 2021	1.144%

Season 2 (6 episodes)

Ep. #	Air Date	Rating
1	October 6, 2021	1.030%
2	October 13, 2021	1.101%
3	October 20, 2021	0.803%
4	October 27, 2021	1.074%
5	November 3, 2021	0.965%
6	November 10, 2021	0.912%
