= Matching Survival 1+1 =

- Promotional poster
- Also known as: Some Vival 1+1
- Starring: Lee Soo-geun; Kim Hee-chul; Soyou; P.O
- Country of origin: South Korea
- Original language: Korean
- No. of episodes: 20

Production
- Running time: 80 minutes
- Production company: SM Culture & Contents

Original release
- Network: KBS2
- Release: June 26 – November 20, 2019

Matching Survival 1+1 (Korean: 썸바이벌 1+1) is a South Korean reality show distributed by KBS2 airs on Wednesday at 23:10 KST.

== Format ==
A reality show where contestants seek love in a mall. It features a unique concept where contestants with similar tastes are paired. Contestants who fail to find a match are eliminated, leaving the last two to compete in a final match.

== Host ==
- Lee Soo-geun
- Kim Hee-chul
- Soyou
- P.O

== List of episodes ==
| Ep. # | Broadcast date | Guest(s) |
|---|---|---|
| 1 | June 26, 2019 | — |
| 2 | July 3, 2019 | — |
| 3 | July 10, 2019 | — |
| 4 | July 17, 2019 | — |
| 5 | July 31, 2019 | — |
| 6 | August 7, 2019 | — |
| 7 | August 14, 2019 | — |
| 8 | August 21, 2019 | — |
| 9 | August 28, 2019 | Geun Ji, Joo Jong-hyuk, Yi Hyuk, Kang Kyun-sung |
| 10 | September 4, 2019 | Geun Ji, Joo Jong-hyuk, Yi Hyuk, Kang Kyun-sung |
| 11 | September 11, 2019 | Thunder, Kwon Hyuk-soo, Kim Ki-bum, Lee Jin-ho |
| 12 | September 18, 2019 | Thunder, Kwon Hyuk-soo, Kim Ki-bum, Lee Jin-ho |
| 13 | September 25, 2019 | Kim Seung-hye, Choi Hee, Bae Seul-ki, Kang Ye-bin |
| 14 | October 2, 2019 | Kim Seung-hye, Choi Hee, Bae Seul-ki, Kang Ye-bin |
| 15 | October 9, 2019 | Park Soyeong, Kisum, Stephanie |
| 16 | October 16, 2019 | Park Soyeong, Kisum, Stephanie |
| 17 | October 30, 2019 | DDotty, Seo Tae-hoon, Kim Jung-mo |
| 18 | November 6, 2019 | DDotty, Seo Tae-hoon, Kim Jung-mo |
| 19 | November 13, 2019 | Oh Nami, Jo Jung-min, Nada, Shin Soo-ji |
| 20 | November 20, 2019 | Oh Nami, Jo Jung-min, Nada, Shin Soo-ji |

== Ratings ==
In the tables below, the blue numbers represent the lowest ratings and the red numbers represent the highest ratings.

| Ep. | Broadcast date | Average audience share (AGB Nielsen) | |
| Ep. | Broadcast date | Part 1 | Part 2 |
|---|---|---|---|
| 1 | June 26, 2019 | 1.3% | 0.9% |
| 2 | July 3, 2019 | 1.3% | 0.8% |
| 3 | July 10, 2019 | 1.3% | 1.1% |
| 4 | July 17, 2019 | 1.1% | 0.7% |
| 5 | July 31, 2019 | 1.0% | 0.6% |
| 6 | August 7, 2019 | 0.7% | 0.6% |
| 7 | August 14, 2019 | 0.9% | 0.8% |
| 8 | August 21, 2019 | 0.9% | 0.7% |
| 9 | August 28, 2019 | 0.8% | 0.6% |
| 10 | September 4, 2019 | 1.0% | 0.6% |
| 11 | September 11, 2019 | 1.1% | 1.1% |
| 12 | September 18, 2019 | 1.3% | 0.9% |
| 13 | September 25, 2019 | 1.6% | 1.0% |
| 14 | October 2, 2019 | 1.5% | 1.1% |
| 15 | October 9, 2019 | 2.0% | 1.5% |
| 16 | October 16, 2019 | 1.9% | 1.2% |
| 17 | October 30, 2019 | 2.0% | 1.4% |
| 18 | November 6, 2019 | 2.0% | 1.3% |
| 19 | November 13, 2019 | 2.8% | 1.8% |
| 20 | November 20, 2019 | 2.3% | 1.2% |
