= The Voice of Korea season 3 =

2020 South Korean television season

The Voice of Korea
- Season 3
- Hosted by: Jang Sungkyu
- Judges: Sung Si-kyung; Kim Jong-kook; BoA; Dynamic Duo
- Winner: Kim Ji-hyun
- Runner-up: Park Daeun

Release
- Original network: Mnet; tvN
- Original release: May 29, 2020

The third season of the South Korean reality television series The Voice of Korea premiered in May 2020 after a seven-year hiatus. Sung Si-kyung, Kim Jong-kook, BoA, and Dynamic Duo were introduced as the new coaches of the show. The show is hosted by Jang Sungkyu.

== Changes ==
=== Coaches' line-up ===
The coaches of the third season of The Voice of Korea

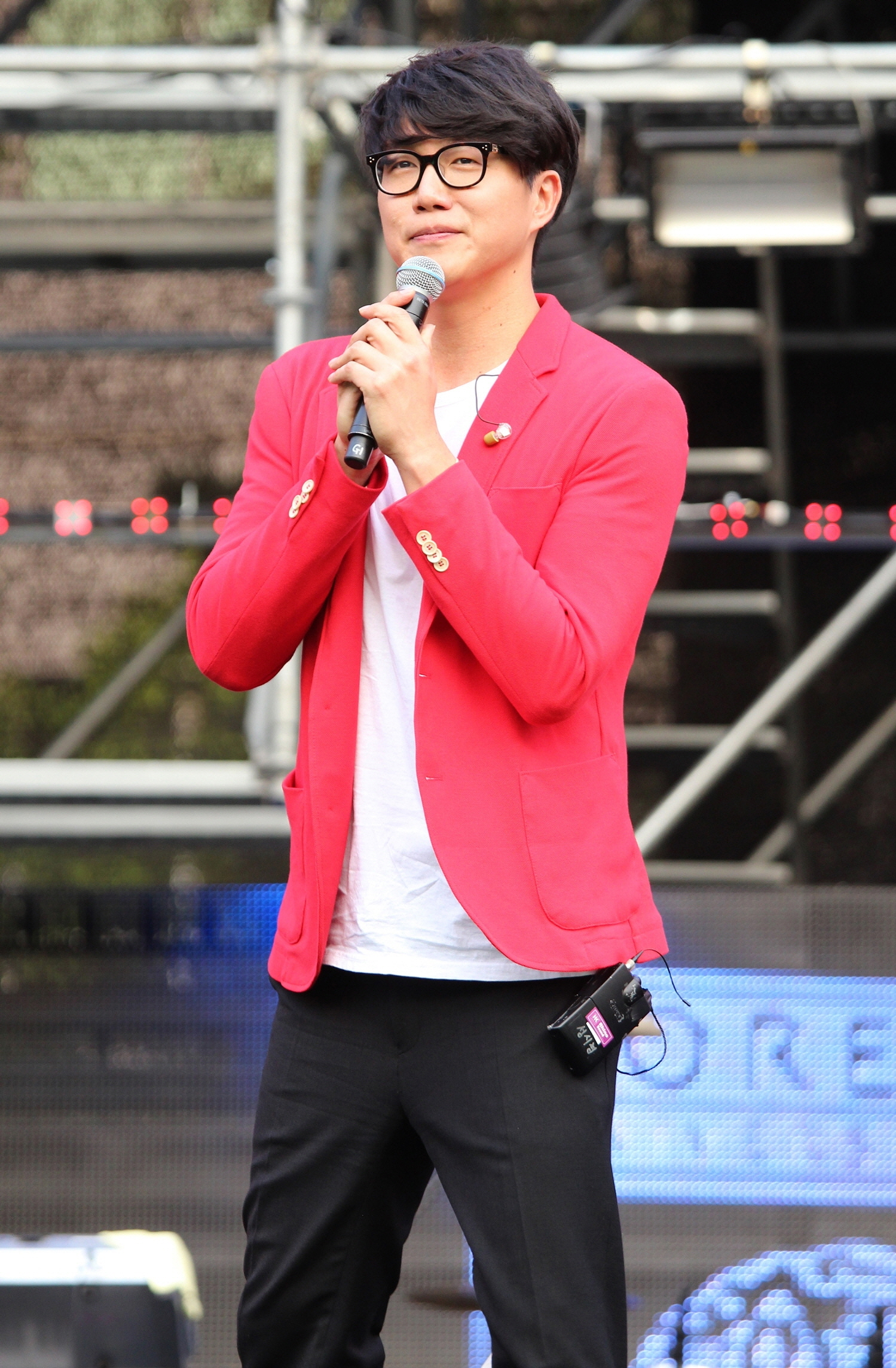
Sung Si-kyung

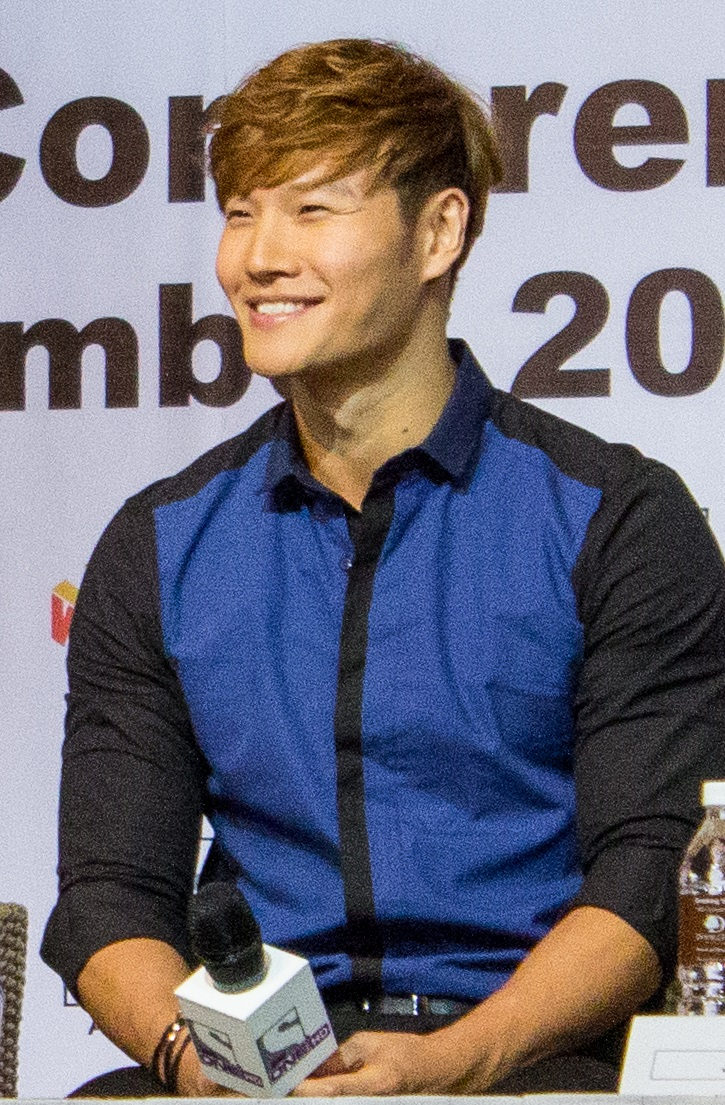
Kim Jong-kook

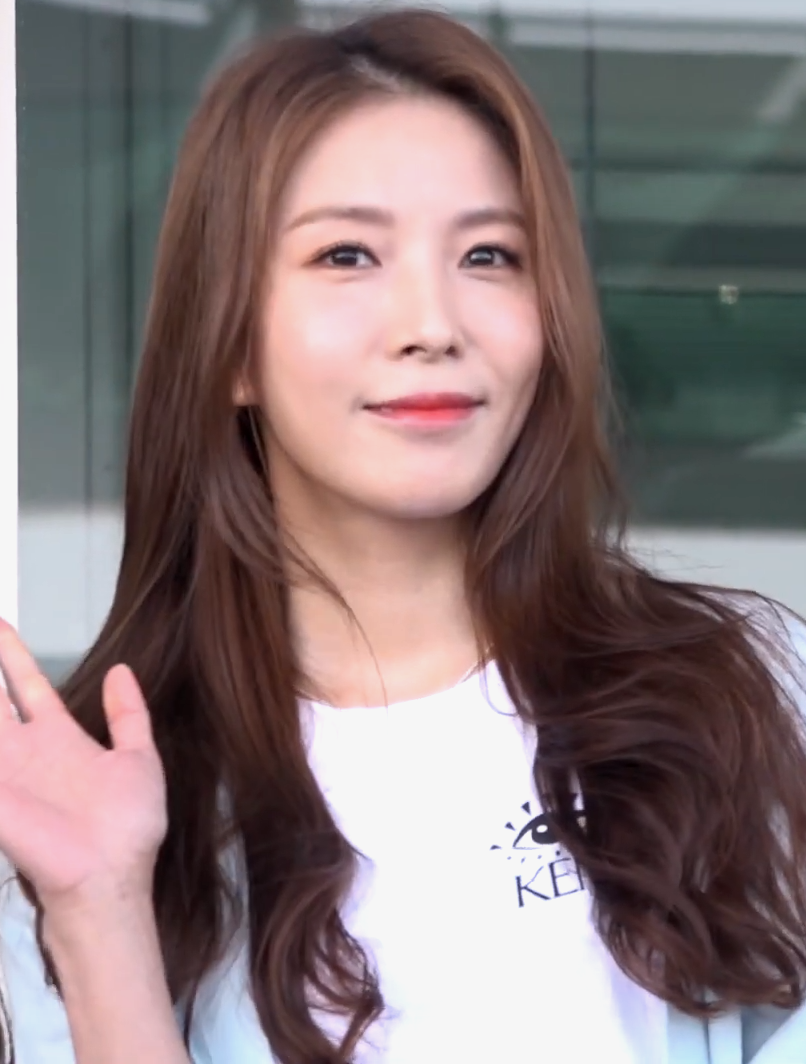
BoA

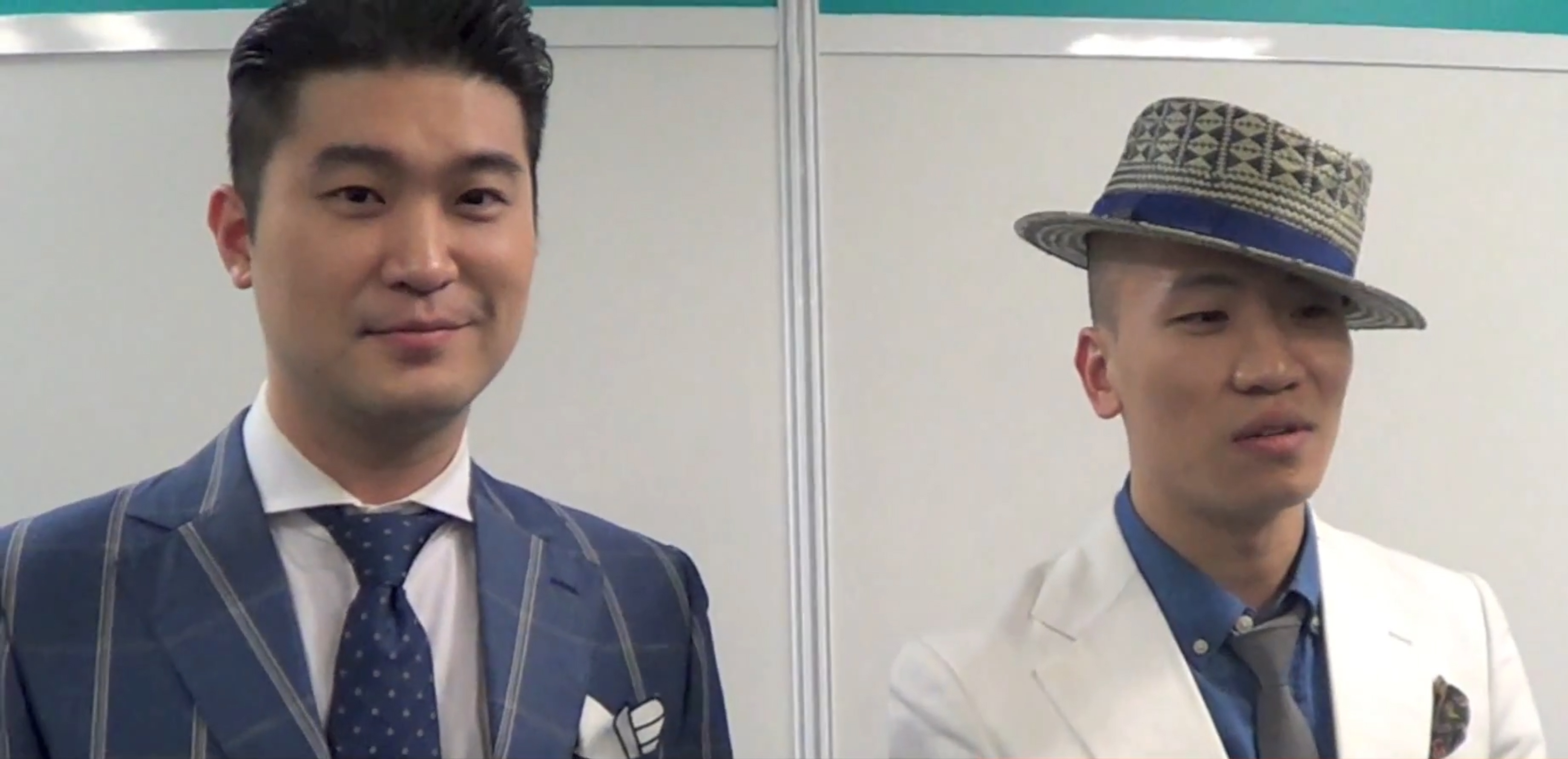
Dynamic Duo

None of the coaches from the previous season has returned. In April 2020, Sung Si-kyung, Kim Jong-kook, BoA, and Dynamic Duo were announced as the four new coaches.

=== Host ===
Jang Sung-kyu was announced as the new host, replacing Kim Jin-pyo.

=== Mechanics ===
==== Block ====
A new feature added in the blind auditions this season is the Block. Each coach is given one block to prevent one coach from getting an artist. Also, each teams were decreased from 12 to 8 members each, bringing the total of artists to 32.

==== The Sing-Offs ====
The Knockout rounds were removed in favor of the Sing-Offs. In the Sing-Offs, one artist from each team is chosen by their coach to directly advance to the semi-finals without performing. The remaining artists perform a short piece in a capella. The winning artist proceeds to the semi-finals.

== Teams ==
Color key

- Winner
- Runner-up
- Third place
- Fourth place
- Eliminated in Semi-Final
- Eliminated in the Sing Offs
- Eliminated in the Battle rounds

Coaches	Top 32 artists			
Sung Sikyung				
Sung Sikyung	Jeon Chulmin	Kim Yeji	Hong Joohyun	Lee Jihea
Sung Sikyung	Lee Nayoung	Lee Ah Young	Kwon Mihee	Son Junhyuk
Kim Jongkook				
Kim Jongkook	Park Daeun	Jung Yujin	Kim Chanho	Jung Jooyoung & Lim Hanna
Kim Jongkook	Kim Yunseol	Kwon Eunjung	Kim Younghob	Park Joohee
BoA				
BoA	Kim Jihyun	Lee Saebom	Doo Sunjung	DAE JONG CHO
BoA	Hwang Jooho	Oh Sewoong	Ra Dajeong	OF US
Dynamic Duo				
Dynamic Duo	Kim Minkyung	Park Changin	Kyung Dasom	Kim Narae
Dynamic Duo	Jo Yekyul	Kim Yejoon	Yoo Jiwon	Im Haena

== Blind auditions ==
A new feature in the blind auditions this season is the Block. Each coach can use it once to prevent one of the other coaches from getting an artist.

The blind auditions were taped without an audience due to the COVID-19 pandemic in South Korea.

Color key

✔	Coach pressed "I WANT YOU" button
	Artist defaulted to a coach's team
	Artist elected a coach's team
	Artist was eliminated with no coach pressing their button
✘	Coach pressed the "I WANT YOU" button, but was blocked by Sung Si-kyung from getting the artist
✘	Coach pressed the "I WANT YOU" button, but was blocked by Kim Jong-kook from getting the artist
✘	Coach pressed the "I WANT YOU" button, but was blocked by BoA from getting the artist
✘	Coach pressed the "I WANT YOU" button, but was blocked by Dynamic Duo from getting the artist

=== Episode 1 (May 29, 2020) ===
Order	Artist	Song	Original Artist	Coach's and artist's choices			
Order	Artist	Song	Original Artist	Si-kyung	Jong-kook	BoA	Dynamic Duo
1	Park Changin	Night after night	Insooni	✔	✔	✔	✔
2	OF US	Late Night	Noel	-	✔	✔	-
3	Park Hyeyeon	Don't Live Like That	Park Mikyung	-	-	-	-
4	Jung Yujin (Note: Former member of The Ark)	Love, ing	Ben	✔	✔	✔	✔
5	Hwang Jooho	Only You	Huh Gak	✘	✔	✔	✔
6	Hong Joohyun	Lost Child	Lena Park	✔	✔	-	-
7	Jo Yekyul (Note: Member of Yegyul Band)	Song Of Gra'Sona	Let's Play	-	✔	✔	✔
8	Kim Yeji	Shinchon Blue	Lee Jae Min	✔	✔	✔	✔

=== Episode 2 (June 5, 2020) ===
Order	Artist	Song	Original Artist	Coach's and artist's choices												
Order	Artist	Song	Original Artist	Si-kyung	Jong-kook	BoA	Dynamic Duo									
1	Lee Saebom (Note: Participant on the third season of I Can See Your Voice)	Warning	Tashannie	-	-	✔	✔									
2	Kim Chanho	If it is you	Jung Seung-hwan	✔	✔	✔	(Note: BoA pressed her block button for Dynamic Duo, but they did not spin yet they are blocked in the episode because they do not have a logic namely invalid block.)	X	3	Uhm Heana	Please	Jeon In-kwon	✔	✔	✔	✔
4	Kim Eunbi (Note: Contestant on Superstar K2)	HIP	MAMAMOO	-	-	-	-									
5	Lee Jihea (Note: Contestant on Superstar K4)	All About You	Taeyeon	✔	✔	✔	✔									
6	Park Daeun (Note: Participant on the fourth season of I Can See Your Voice)	Blue Cocktail Scent	Han Youngae	✔	✔	-	✔									
7	Jeon Chulmin (Note: The Winner on Kim bamsoo episode of the second season of Hidden Singer)	Beautiful Fact	Boohwal	✔	✔	✔	✔									
8	Yoo Jiwon	Make Up (ft. Crush)	Sam Kim	✔	-	✔	✔									
9	Kim Jihyun	Please	Lee So-ra	✔	✔	✔	✔									

=== Episode 3 (June 12, 2020) ===
Order	Artist	Song	Original Artist	Coach's and artist's choices			
Order	Artist	Song	Original Artist	Si-kyung	Jong-kook	BoA	Dynamic Duo
1	Lee Woongyeol (Note: Participant on the fourth season of I Can See Your Voice)	One Man	Kim Jong-kook	-	-	-	-
2	Doo Sunjung	Dalla Dalla	Itzy	✔	-	✔	✔
3	DAE JONG CHO	Tell me that you love me	M to M	-	-	✔	-
4	Son Junhyuk (Note: Former member M to M)	Last Love	Kim Bum-soo	✔	-	-	-
5	Lee Nayoung	Only One	BoA	✔	✔	✔	-
6	Kim Narae (Note: Former member EYE TO EYE)	Nocturne	Kim Yuna	✔	✔	✔	✔
7	Kim Yunseol (Note: The Winner on the 6th episode of seventh season of I Can See Your Voice)	Only I Didn't Know	IU	-	✔	✔	-
8	Seong Yubin (Note: Actor Lee Taesung brother)	Passing	Kim Bumsoo	-	-	-	-
9	Kim Minkyung (Note: Contestant on MIXNINE)	Don't Know You	Heize	✔	-	-	✔
10	Kim Youngheum (Note: Appeared on second season of Vocal Play)	My Love by My Side	Hyunsik & Hakchul	✘	✔	✔	✔

=== Episode 4 (June 19, 2020) ===
Order	Artist	Song	Original Artist	Coach's and artist's choices			
Order	Artist	Song	Original Artist	Si-kyung	Jong-kook	BoA	Dynamic Duo
1	Jung Jooyoung & Lim Hanna	Love Me Right	Exo	✔	✔	-	-
2	Kwon Mihee	Nocturne	Kim Yuna	✔	-	-	-
3	Kyung Dasom	Latata	(G)I-dle	✔	-	-	✔
4	Park Joohee	Bounced Farewell	Kim Hyun-jung	-	✔	-	-
5	Kwon Eunjung	Peek-a-Boo	Red Velvet	-	✔	-	-
6	Oh Sewoong	I'm Your Man (Korean ver.)	2PM	-	Team full	✔	-
7	Ra Dajeong	Decalcomanie	Mamamoo	✔	✘ (Note: Jong Kook has already completed his team but was able to turn since the audition was taped before he completed his eight artists.)	✔	-
9	Lee Ah Young	Clockwork	Lim Jeong-hee	✔	Team full	Team full	-
10	Kim Yejoon (Note: Contestant on Under Nineteen)	Beautiful	Crush	Team full	Team full	Team full	✔

== The Battles ==
The advisors for this round are Kim Johan for Team Sung Sikyung, Lyn for Team Kim Jongkook, Jang Jin-young for Team BoA, and Sunwoo Junga for Team Dynamic Duo. Artists who win their battle advance to the Sing-Off Rounds.

Color key:

Artist won the Battle and advanced to the Sing-Off
Artist lost the Battle and was eliminated

Episodes	Coach	Order	Winner	Song	Original Artist	Loser
Episode 4 (June 19, 2020)	Kim Jong-kook	1	Jung Yujin	I Will Go to You Like the First Snow	Ailee	Park Joohee
Episode 4 (June 19, 2020)	BoA	2	DAE JONG CHO	Love In The Ice	TVXQ	OF US
Episode 4 (June 19, 2020)	Dynamic Duo	3	Park Changin	Night Train	In Halee	Uhm Heana
Episode 5 (June 26, 2020)	Dynamic Duo	1	Kim Narae	D(half moon)	Dean	Yoo Jiwon
Episode 5 (June 26, 2020)	BoA	2	Lee Saebom	1, 2, 3, 4	Lee Hi	Ra Dajeong
Episode 5 (June 26, 2020)	Sung Si-kyung	3	Jeon Chulmin	Lean On	Shin Yong Jae	Son Junhyuk
Episode 5 (June 26, 2020)	Dynamic Duo	4	Kim Minkyung	Can't Love You Anymore	IU & Oh Hyuk	Kim Yejoon
Episode 5 (June 26, 2020)	Kim Jong-kook	5	Park Daeun	Last station of the farewell	Son Sihyang	Kim Younghob
Episode 5 (June 26, 2020)	Sung Si-kyung	6	Kim Yeji	Walking Along With You	Cho Yong-pil	Kwon Mihee
Episode 6 (July 3, 2020)	BoA	1	Doo Sunjung	Twenty Five, Twenty One	Jaurim	Oh Sewoong
Episode 6 (July 3, 2020)	Sung Si-kyung	2	Lee Jihea	Na Won Ju	Baek Ji-young	Lee Ah Young
Episode 6 (July 3, 2020)	Kim Jong-kook	3	Jung Jooyoung & Lim Hanna	Very Nice	Seventeen	Kwon Eunjung
Episode 6 (July 3, 2020)	Sung Si-kyung	4	Hong Joohyun	How Can I Love the Heartbreak, You're the One I Love	AKMU	Lee Nayoung
Episode 6 (July 3, 2020)	BoA	5	Kim Jihyun	Run With Me	SWJA (sunwoojunga)	Hwang Jooho
Episode 6 (July 3, 2020)	Kim Jong-kook	6	Kim Chanho	Human, Love	Kim Bum-soo & Lena Park	Kim Yunseol
Episode 6 (July 3, 2020)	Dynamic Duo	7	Kyung Dasom	The Secret Garden	Lee Sangeun	Jo Yekyul

== The Sing-Offs ==
In the Sing-Offs, one artist from each team is chosen by their coach to directly advance to the semi-finals without having to perform on this round. The remaining artists perform a short piece in a capella. The winning artist proceeds to the semi-finals.

Color key

Artist was chosen to advance directly to the Semi-Final
Artist won the Sing-Off and advanced to the Semi-Final
Artist lost the Sing-Off and was eliminated

Episode	Coach	Order	Artist	Song	Original Artist
Episode 6 (July 3, 2020)	Kim Jong-kook	-	Jung Yujin	Advanced directly to the semi-finals	
Episode 6 (July 3, 2020)	Kim Jong-kook	1	Kim Chanho	Good Person	Park Hyo-shin
Episode 6 (July 3, 2020)	Kim Jong-kook	2	Jung Jooyoung & Lim Hanna	Thank You (For Saving My Life)	Cho Kyuchan
Episode 6 (July 3, 2020)	Kim Jong-kook	3	Park Daeun	It's Not Love If It Hurts Too Much	Kim Gwangsuk
Episode 6 (July 3, 2020)	BoA	-	Kim Jihyun	Advanced directly to the semi-finals	
Episode 6 (July 3, 2020)	BoA	4	Doo Sunjung	Whistling	Lee Moon-sae
Episode 6 (July 3, 2020)	BoA	5	Lee Saebom	Energetic	Wanna One
Episode 6 (July 3, 2020)	BoA	6	DAE JONG CHO	For My Love	M.Street
Episode 6 (July 3, 2020)	Dynamic Duo	-	Park Changin	Advanced directly to the semi-finals	
Episode 6 (July 3, 2020)	Dynamic Duo	7	Kim Minkyung	Every Moment of You	Sung Si-kyung
Episode 6 (July 3, 2020)	Dynamic Duo	8	Kim Narae	Always	Don Spike & Lena Park
Episode 6 (July 3, 2020)	Dynamic Duo	9	Kyung Dasom	And July	Heize
Episode 6 (July 3, 2020)	Sung Si-kyung	-	Kim Yeji	Advanced directly to the semi-finals	
Episode 6 (July 3, 2020)	Sung Si-kyung	10	Hong Joohyun	Fool	Park Hyo-shin
Episode 6 (July 3, 2020)	Sung Si-kyung	11	Lee Jihea	Knot	Ha Dong Qn
Episode 6 (July 3, 2020)	Sung Si-kyung	12	Jeon Chulmin	A Daily Song	Hwang Chi-yeul

== Live shows ==
=== Semi-final (July 10, 2020) ===
Color key

Artist won the Semi-Final and advanced to the Final
Artist lost the Semi-Final and was eliminated

Order	Coach	Artist	Song	Original Artist
1	Kim Jong-kook	Jung Yujin	Living In the Same Time	Naul
2	Kim Jong-kook	Park Daeun	Fake Love	BTS
3	Dynamic Duo	Park Changin	Solo	Jennie
4	Dynamic Duo	Kim Minkyung	Hush	Miss A
5	Sung Si-kyung	Jeon Chulmin	Beautiful Moment Instrumenta	K.Will
6	Sung Si-kyung	Kim Yeji	Tomboy	Hyukoh
7	BoA	Kim Jihyun	What's the matter	Kim Hyunchul
8	BoA	Lee Saebom	Tempo	Exo

=== Final (July 10, 2020) ===
Color key:

Winner
Runner-up
Third place
Fourth place

Order	Coach	Artist	Song	Original Artist	Public Vote (%)
1	Dynamic Duo	Kim Minkyung	You're Just At A Higher Place Than Me	Shin Seung-hun	9
2	Kim Jong-kook	Park Daeun	The Night Alone	Kim Kwang-seok	27
3	Sung Si-kyung	Jeon Chulmin	When Spring Comes	Big Mama King	25
4	BoA	Kim Jihyun	Hidden Road	Yoo Jae-ha	39

Non-competition performances
Order	Performers	Song	Original Artist
1	Kim Younghob & Park Joohee (Team Jong-kook), Doo Sunjung & Ra Dajeong (Team BoA), Yoo Jiwon & Uhm Heana (Team Dynamic Duo), Lee Jihea & Hong Joohyun (Team Si-kyung)	Whenever	Toy

== Ratings ==
Episode	Air date	AGB Ratings		
Episode	Air date	Mnet	tvN	Sum
1	May 29, 2020	0.4%	2.0%	2.4%
2	June 5, 2020	0.4%	1.7%	2.1%
3	June 12, 2020	0.6%	1.6%	2.2%
4	June 19, 2020	0.7%	1.3%	2.0%
5	June 26, 2020	0.5%	1.2%	1.7%
6	July 3, 2020	0.4%	1.6%	2.0%
7	July 10, 2020	0.5%	1.0%	1.5%
