= Perfect on Paper =

- Promotional poster
- Created by: JTBC; Endemol Shine Group
- Starring: Shin Dong-yup; Kim Hee-chul
- Country of origin: South Korea
- Original language: Korean
- No. of episodes: 10

Production
- Running time: 60 minutes
- Production company: JTBC

Original release
- Network: JTBC
- Release: November 10, 2017 – January 12, 2018

Perfect on Paper (Korean: 이론상 완벽한 남자), is a couple matching program produced by JTBC and Endemol Shine Group, a global production powerhouse that creates content for a worldwide audience. The show was aired every Friday at 21:00.

== Format ==
It is a variety show that will attempt to match couples based on characteristics such as personal disposition, lifestyle, and values. This contrasts from most other Korean matchmaking programs which focus on qualifications such as occupation, education, wealth, and physical appearance. Scientific and systematic analysis by experts will be used to match people that appear perfect together on paper.

== Main Host ==
- Shin Dong-yup
- Kim Hee-chul

== List of episodes and rating ==
In the ratings below, the highest rating for the show will be in red, and the lowest rating for the show will be in blue.

Episode #	Air Date	Guest(s)	AGB Nielsen ratings
Pilot	October 2, 2017	Han Hye-jin	—N/a
1	November 10, 2017	Lady Jane, DinDin	1.656%
2	November 17, 2017	Lady Jane, DinDin	1.472%
3	November 24, 2017	Lady Jane, DinDin	1.529%
4	December 1, 2017	Lady Jane, Shindong	1.167%
5	December 8, 2017	Lady Jane, DinDin	1.357%
6	December 15, 2017	Lady Jane, DinDin	1.155%
7	December 22, 2017	Lady Jane, DinDin	1.359%
8	December 29, 2017	Lady Jane, DinDin	1.127%
9	January 5, 2018	Lady Jane, DinDin	1.286%
10	January 12, 2018	Lady Jane, DinDin (Note: (Special feature of artists: Joo Woo Jae, Kim Sang-hyuk, Cho Jun-ho, Shindong, Robin Deiana, Sam Okyere, BIGONE, Yang Sang-guk))	1.533%

Note: This show airs on a cable channel/pay TV which normally has a relatively smaller audience compared to free-to-air TV/public broadcasters (KBS, SBS, MBC & EBS).
