= Wednesday Food Talk =

- Promotional poster
- Also known as: The Demand of Luxurious Food
- Genre: Food-Talk show
- Starring: Jun Hyun-moo; Shin Dong-yup; Shin A-young; Park Chan Il; Park Junwoo; Song Jung Rim
- Country of origin: South Korea
- Original language: Korean
- No. of episodes: 224

Production
- Running time: 60 minute

Original release
- Network: tvN (1-203); O'live (204-223)
- Release: January 21, 2015 – October 8, 2019

Wednesday Food Talk (Korean: 수요미식회) is a South Korean Food-Talk show distributed by O'live every Wednesday at 20:50 pm.

== Airtime ==
| Airdate | Airtime | channel |
|---|---|---|
| January 21, 2015 – April 15, 2015 | Wednesday at 23:00 KST | tvN |
| April 29, 2015 – September 6, 2017 | Wednesday at 21:30 KST | tvN |
| September 13, 2017 – October 4, 2017 | Wednesday at 20:10 KST | tvN |
| October 11, 2017 – May 30, 2018 | Wednesday at 22:50 KST | tvN |
| June 6, 2018 – September 19, 2018 – January 2, 2019 – April 17, 2019 | Wednesday at 00:20 KST | tvN |
| May 28, 2019 – October 8, 2019 | Wednesday at 20:50 KST | O'live |

== Panelist ==
- Jun Hyun-moo (EP 1 – 224)
- Shin Dong-yup (EP 14 – 224)
- Park Chan Il (EP 188 – 224)
- Ha Seok-jin (EP 204 – 224)
- Kim So-eun (EP 204 – 224)
- Min Jung (EP 204 – 224)
- Shin A-young (EP 188 – 203)
- Song Jung Rim (EP 188 – 203)
- Park Junwoo (EP 188 – 203)
- Lee Hyun-woo (EP 14 – 187)
- Hong Shin Ae (EP 1 – 187)
- Hwang Gyo-ik (EP 1 – 187)
- Kang Yong-suk (EP 1 – 27)
- Kim Hee-chul (EP 1 – 13)
- Kim Yu-seok (EP 1 – 13)
- Park Yong-in (EP 1 – 13)
