= Shin Dong-yup (comedian) =

South Korean comedian, presenter

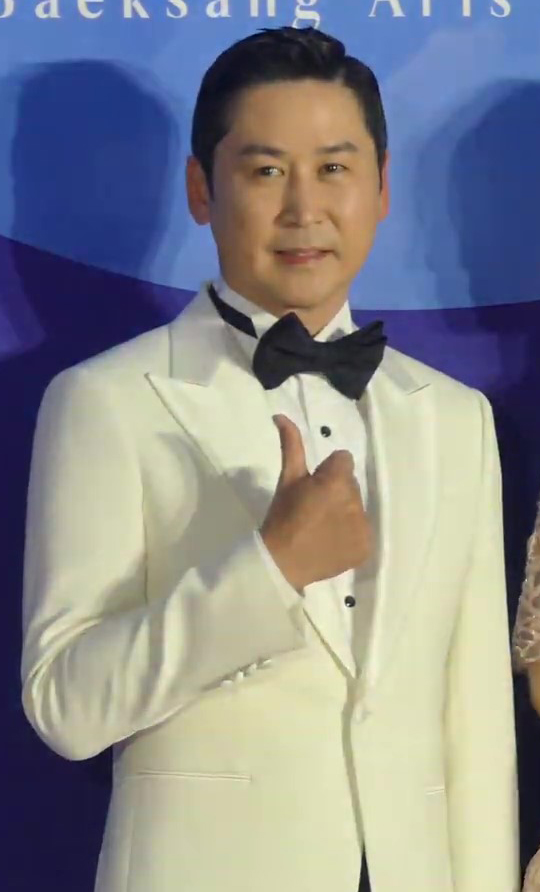
- Shin Dong-yup in May 2019
- Born: February 17, 1971 (age 55); Jecheon, Chungcheongbuk-do, South Korea
- Spouse: Sun Hye-yoon (m. 2006)

Comedy career
- Years active: 1991–present

Korean name
- Hangul: 신동엽
- Hanja: 申東燁
- RR: Sin Dongyeop
- MR: Sin Tongyŏp

Shin Dong-yup (Korean: 신동엽; born February 17, 1971) is a South Korean comedian and television comedy show host. He graduated from the Seoul Institute of the Arts. He became popular after appearing in SBS's variety program Happy Saturday and MBC's sitcom Guys n Girls.

== Career ==
In late 1991, he was selected as an SBS special employment comedian in tandem with the channel's launch. His catchphrase in the I Like to Laugh corner "Rail Man", "안녕하시렵니까", gave him immediate attention. He also became a model and was regarded as a handsome comedian along with Lee Hwi-jae and Park Soo-hong.

He continued his popularity, appearing in programs like the SBS variety show Happy Our Saturday and the MBC sitcom Guys and Girls, until he took an 11-month hiatus in 1999 due to being charged with smoking marijuana. He returned to TV in 2000 through the Sunday Night corner "Love House". Subsequently, he enjoyed his golden age with shows like Happy Together, Exclamation Mark, and Hey Hey Hey.

After the mid-2000s, his specialty of acting and skits hosting alone did not fit with the zeitgeist of "real variety" and group hosting, and shows that he starred in like Quiz Prince, Oppa Band, Champagne, and Night Star were cancelled due to low ratings. Afterwards, his quick-witted hosting in audition programs like 2011's Kim Yuna's Kiss & Cry and 2012's Immortal Songs: Singing the Legend gained him popularity, and by becoming the main MC of programs like Hello Counselor and Strong Heart he experienced a second golden age, winning the grand prize in the 2012 KBS Entertainment Awards. He is recognized on cable channels for his characteristic sex comedy.

== Filmography ==
=== Television shows ===
Off-Air On-Air

Year	Title	Role	Notes	Ref.
1993	I Like to Laugh	MC		
1994–2001	Our Happy Saturday	MC		
1996–1999	Guys n Girls	Shin Dong-yup		
2001–present	TV Animal Farm	MC		
2004	Shin Dong-yeop's Love's Commissioned Mother	Host		
2007–2008	Explorers of the Human Body	Main Host		
2008	Change	MC		
2008–2010	Champagne	Main Host		
2009	Oppa Band			
2009	Quiz Prince			
2010	Sweet Night	Main Host		
2010–2019	Hello Counselor	Main Host		
2011	Kim Yuna's Kiss & Cry	MC		
2011	BIGsTORY			
2011-present	Immortal Songs: Singing the Legend	Main stage MC		
2012	Quiz on Korea			
2012–2013	Strong Heart	Main Host		
2012–2017	Saturday Night Live Korea	Regular Member	Season 3–9	
2013	Hwasin: Controller of the Heart	Main Host		
2013–2014	Beatles Code 3D	Main Host		
2013–2014	Gentleman	MC		
2013–2015	Witch Hunt	Main Host		
2014	Fashion King Korea			
2015–2019	Wednesday Food Talk	Main Host	Episode 14–224	
2016	Tribe of Hip Hop	Main Host		
2016–2017	What Shall We Eat Today - Delivery	Main Host		
2016–2017	Hip Hop Tribe 2: Game of Thrones	Main Host		
2016–2019	Life Bar	Main Host		
2016–present	My Little Old Boy	Main Host		
2017	Golden Egg			
2017–2018	Perfect on Paper	Main Host		
2017–2018	Modulove	Main Host		
2018	Coming Soon	Main Host		
2018	Love Catcher	Main Host		
2018	Big Forest			
2018–present	DoReMi Market	Cast Member		
2018–present	True Story	Cast Member		
2019	Studio Vibes	Main Host		
2019	The Night of Hate Comments	Main Host		
2019	Today's Fortune	MC		
2019	Love Catcher 2	Main Host		
2019–2020	What is Studying?	Main Host		
2020	Love of 7.7 Billion	Main Host		
2020	Going to the End	Regular Member		
2020	The Meow is Fake	Regular Member		
2020	Redevelopment of Love	Main Host		
2020–2021	We Got Divorced	Main Host	Season 1	
2021	Are You Hungry for Delivery? Just Order It!	Cast Member		
2021	With God	Host		
2021	With God Season 2	Host		
2021	Legend Music Class - Lalaland	Host		
2021	Joseon Star	Host		
2021	I Need Women	Host		
2021	Along with the Gods 2	Host		
2021	Crazy Love.X	Host		
2022	We Got Divorced	Host	Season 2	
2022	Along with the Gods 3	Host		
2022	Our Cha Cha Cha	Host		
2022	I'll take care of it	Host	Chuseok special	
2022	Handless Day	Host		
2023	Oh Eun-young Game	Host		
2023	Office Villain	Host		
2023	Rest Couple	Host	with Han Chae-ah	

=== Web shows ===
Year	Title	Role	Ref.
2021	True Golfer	Regular Member	
2022	Witch Hunt 2022	Host	
2022	Mary Queer	Host	
2023	Risqué Business Japan	Host	

=== Television series ===
Year	Title	Role	Notes
2004	Not Alone	Shin Dong Yup	
2007	If In Love Like Them		Support Role
2011	Vampire Idol	Shin Dong Yup [Taechi Taechi Ups]	
2012	Reply 1997	MC of 1998 Golden Awards	Voice (Episode 10)
2015	The Producers	Himself	Cameo (Episode 3)
2016	The Sound of Your Heart	Himself	Cameo (Episode 12)
2017	Borg Mom	Do Hye's husband	Guest Role
2018	Wok of Love	Horse's voice	Guest Role
2018	Big Forest	Shin Dong Yup	

=== Hosting ===
Event/ Show	Year	Notes	Ref.
Baeksang Arts Awards	2014	with Kim Ah-joong	
Baeksang Arts Awards	2015	with Kim Ah-joong and Joo Won	
Baeksang Arts Awards	2016	with Bae Suzy	
Baeksang Arts Awards	2018	with Bae Suzy and Park Bo-gum	
Baeksang Arts Awards	2019	with Bae Suzy and Park Bo-gum	
Baeksang Arts Awards	2020	with Bae Suzy and Park Bo-gum	
Baeksang Arts Awards	2021	with Bae Suzy	
Baeksang Arts Awards	2022	with Bae Suzy and Park Bo-gum	
Baeksang Arts Awards	2023	With Park Bo-gum and Bae Suzy	
Hanteo Music Awards	2023	with Eugene	
SBS Drama Awards	2017	with Lee Bo-young	
SBS Drama Awards	2018	with Shin Hye-sun and Lee Je-hoon	
SBS Drama Awards	2019	with Jang Na-ra	
SBS Drama Awards	2020	with Kim Yoo-jung	
SBS Drama Awards	2021	with Kim Yoo-jung	
SBS Drama Awards	2022	with Ahn Hyo-seop and Kim Se-jeong	
SBS Drama Awards	2023	With Kim Yoo-jung	
SBS Drama Awards	2024	with Kim Hye-yoon and Kim Ji-yeon	
SBS Drama Awards	2025	with Heo Nam-jun and Chae Won-bin	
SBS Entertainment Awards	2020	with Cha Eun-woo and Lee Seung-gi	
KBS Entertainment Awards	2023	with Cho Yi-hyun, Joo Woo-jae	

== Accolades ==
=== Awards and nominations ===
Name of the award ceremony, year presented, category, nominee of the award, and the result of the nomination
Award ceremony	Year	Category	Nominee / Work	Result	Ref.
Baeksang Arts Awards	1994	Best Male Variety Performer	Happy Saturday	Won	
Baeksang Arts Awards	2014	Best Male Variety Performer	Witch Hunt	Won	
Baeksang Arts Awards	2019	Best Male Variety Performer	My Little Old Boy	Nominated	
Baeksang Arts Awards	2021	Best Male Variety Performer	Immortal Songs: Singing the Legend, My Little Old Boy	Nominated	
Baeksang Arts Awards	2025	Best Male Variety Performer	Shin Dong-yup	Won	
Blue Dragon Series Awards	2022	Best Male Entertainer	SNL Korea	Nominated	
Blue Dragon Series Awards	2023	Best Male Entertainer	SNL Korea	Nominated	
Blue Dragon Series Awards	2024	Best Male Entertainer	SNL Korea	Won	
Cable TV Broadcasting Awards	2017	Best Cable MC Award	Brave Journalists	Won	
KBS Entertainment Awards	2002	Grand Prize (Daesang)	Shin Dong-yup	Won	
KBS Entertainment Awards	2012	Grand Prize (Daesang)	Immortal Songs: Singing the Legend, Hello Counselor	Won	
KBS Entertainment Awards	2016	Grand Prize (Daesang)	Hello Counselor	Nominated	
KBS Entertainment Awards	2018	Grand Prize (Daesang)	Immortal Songs: Singing the Legend, Hello Counselor	Nominated	
KBS Entertainment Awards	2019	Producer Special Award	Immortal Songs: Singing the Legend, Hello Counselor	Won	
KBS Entertainment Awards	2022	Grand Prize (Daesang)	Immortal Songs: Singing the Legend, Hello Counselor	Won	
KBS Entertainment Awards	2022	This Year's Entertertainer Award	Immortal Songs: Singing the Legend, Hello Counselor	Won	
Korea Broadcasting Awards	2013	Individual Award in Host Category	Shin Dong-yup	Won	
Korea PD Awards	2017	TV Performer Award	My Little Old Boy	Won	
Mnet 20's Choice Awards	2013	Variety Star	SNL Korea	Won	
SBS Drama Awards	1993	Best Actor in Comedy	Shin Dong-yup	Won	
SBS Drama Awards	2002	Special Award for TV MC	Shin Dong-yup	Won	
SBS Drama Awards	2007	New Star Award	War of Money	Won	
SBS Entertainment Awards	2010	SBS 20th Anniversary Entertainment Top 10 Star Award	Shin Dong-yup	Won	
SBS Entertainment Awards	2011	Netizen Popularity Award	Bigstory	Nominated	
SBS Entertainment Awards	2012	Best Couple Award	Shin Dong-yup (with Lee Dong-wook); Strong Heart	Won	
SBS Entertainment Awards	2016	Grand Prize (Daesang)	My Little Old Boy, TV Animal Farm	Won	
SBS Entertainment Awards	2021	Grand Prize (Daesang)	with My Little Old Boy team (Note: with Seo Jang-hoon, Cho Hye-seon, Kim Sun-ja, Park Young-hye, Lee Sang-min, Tak Jae-hoon, Im Won-hee, Kim Joon-ho, Kim Jong-kook, Kim Hee-chul, Lee Tae-sung, Oh Min-suk, Park Goon, Choi Jin-hyuk)	Won	
SBS Entertainment Awards	2021	Entertainer of the Year	My Little Old Boy, TV Animal Farm, I Need a Warm-up	Won	
Style Icon Awards	2013	Style Icon	Shin Dong-yup	Won	
tvN10 Awards	2016	Best MC	SNL Korea	Won	

=== State honors ===
Name of country, year given, and name of honor
Country	Organization	Year	Honor or Award	Ref.
South Korea	Korean Popular Culture and Arts Awards (Note: Honors are given at the Korean Popular Culture and Arts Awards, arranged by the Korea Creative Content Agency and hosted by the Ministry of Culture, Sports and Tourism. They are awarded to those who have contributed to the arts and South Korea's pop culture.)	2014	Prime Minister's Commendation	
South Korea	Korean Popular Culture and Arts Awards	2023	Presidential Commendation	

=== Listicles ===
Name of publisher, year listed, name of listicle, and placement
Publisher	Year	Listicle	Placement	Ref.
Forbes	2014	Korea Power Celebrity	33rd	
Forbes	2016	Korea Power Celebrity	27th	
Forbes	2017	Korea Power Celebrity	30th	
Forbes	2018	Korea Power Celebrity	32nd	
