= Sung Si-kyung =

South Korean singer and TV host

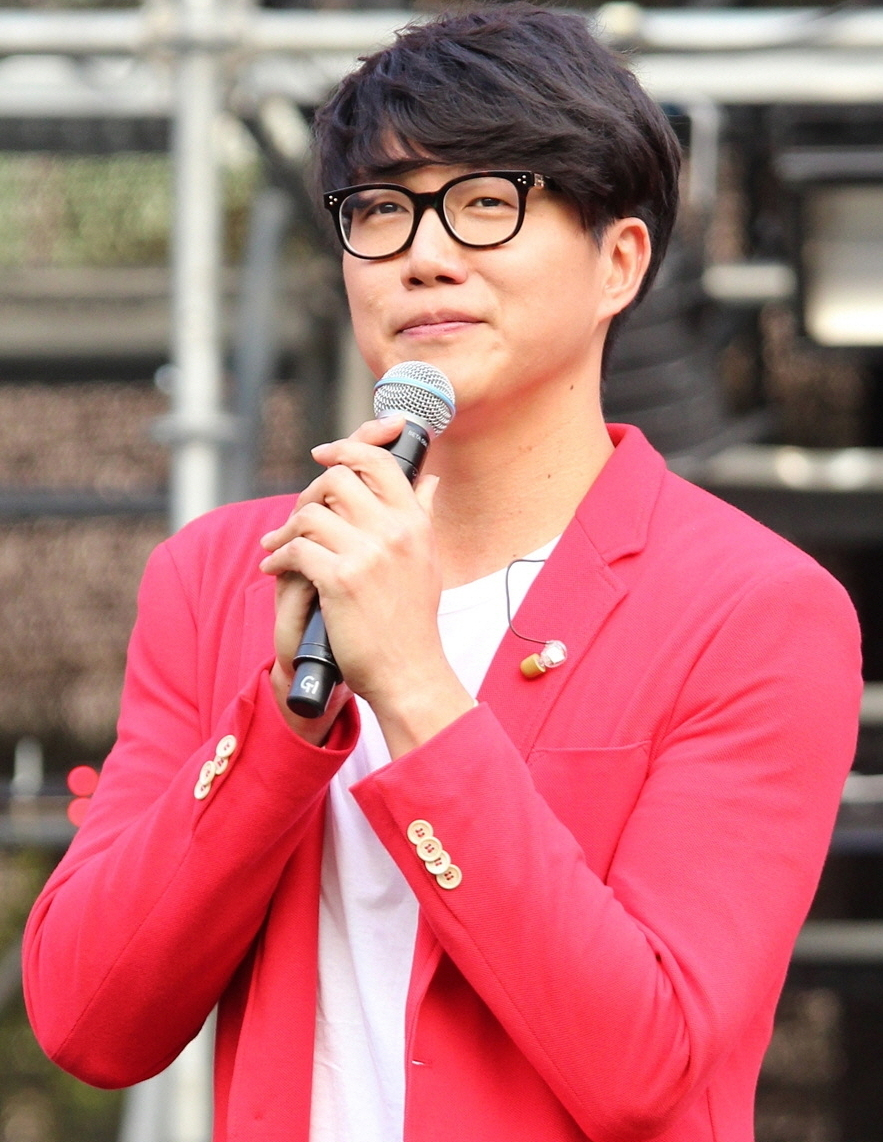
- Sung in May 2014
- Born: April 17, 1979 (age 47); Seoul, South Korea
- Education: Korea University
- Occupations: Singer; television host
- Musical career
- Genre: Pop ballad
- Instruments: Vocals, piano
- Years active: 2000–present
- Labels: Jellyfish; King Records
- Website: sungsikyung.jp

Korean name
- Hangul: 성시경
- Hanja: 成始璄
- RR: Seong Sigyeong
- MR: Sŏng Sigyŏng

Sung Si-kyung (Korean: 성시경; born April 17, 1979) is a South Korean singer, entertainer and television host. He debuted in 2001 and has released eight studio albums in Korean and three studio albums in Japanese. He has also hosted and appeared on numerous South Korean variety television shows including 2 Days & 1 Night, Witch Hunt, Non-Summit, Duet Song Festival, Vocal War: God's Voice, Battle Trip, The Voice of Korea 2020, On & Off.

== Career ==
Sung was born and raised in Gangnam-gu, Seoul, South Korea. He attended Korea University. Sung's comeback track "난 좋아" (Even Now) released on his 7th album debuted at number 5 on Billboard's Korea K-Pop Hot 100 for the week of September 22. In 2019, Sung announced his first U.S. concert tour, a six-show trek across most major U.S. markets. Sung released an English song "And We Go" in May 2020. In May 2021, Sung released his eighth Korean studio album, Siot (ㅅ), marking his first full-length album in ten years. He has also expanded his presence on digital platforms, gaining significant popularity through his personal YouTube channel, particularly with his restaurant review series Mokgeultende (먹을텐데).

== Personal life ==
=== Unregistered agency ===
Sung's one-person agency, SK Jaewon (에스케이재원), was reported in September 2025 to have run management work for about 14 years without popular-culture planning-business registration. Coverage treated that as a possible offence under the Popular Culture and Arts Industry Development Act (up to two years' imprisonment or a ₩20 million fine). The firm was incorporated in February 2011; his sister is chief executive and he is its only artist. The agency said it had followed the law in force at incorporation, had not known that a 2014 statute added a registration duty, apologised, and said it would file. In December 2025 Yeongdeungpo Police sent his sister and the company to prosecutors without detention and did not send Sung, saying there was no objective evidence he had run the firm. SK Jaewon said it had received the registration certificate on 27 November 2025.

== Discography ==
=== Korean albums ===
- Like the First Time (2001)
- Melodie D'Amour (2002)
- Double Life; The Other Side (2003)
- I Want to Dream Again (2005)
- The Ballads (2006)
- Here in My Heart (2008)
- The First (2011)
- Siot (2021)

=== Japanese albums ===
- Drama (2017)
- You Are Here (2018)
- You Can Change My Life (2021)

== Accolades ==
=== Awards and nominations ===
Year	Award	Category	Nominated work	Result	Ref.
2001	Golden Disc Awards	Rookie of the Year	Like the First Time	Won	
2001	MBC Gayo Daejejeon	Best New Artist	"Like the First Time"	Won	
2001	Mnet Asian Music Awards	Best New Male Artist	"Like the First Time"	Won	
2001	SBS Gayo Daejeon	Rookie Award	—N/a	Won	
2001	Seoul Music Awards	New Artist Award	—N/a	Won	
2002	Golden Disc Awards	Bonsang	"We Make a Good Pair"	Won	
2002	Mnet Asian Music Awards	Best Male Artist	"We Make a Good Pair"	Won	
2002	SBS Gayo Daejeon	Bonsang	—N/a	Won	
2002	Seoul Music Awards	Bonsang	—N/a	Won	
2003	SBS Gayo Daejeon	Bonsang	—N/a	Won	
2005	KBS Music Awards	Singer of the Year	—N/a	Won	
2006	SBS Gayo Daejeon	Bonsang	—N/a	Won	
2006	Cyworld Digital Music Awards	Song of the Month (November)	"On the Street"	Won	
2007	MBC Drama Awards	Excellence Award in Radio	Blue Nights with Sung Si-kyung	Won	
2011	Mnet Asian Music Awards	Best Male Artist	"I Like"	Nominated	
2012	KBS Entertainment Awards	Best New Entertainer		Nominated	
2012	MBC Entertainment Awards	Top Excellence Award in Radio	FM Music City with Sung Si-kyung	Won	
2014	Mnet Asian Music Awards	Best OST	"Every Moment of You"	Nominated	
2015	Baeksang Arts Awards	Best Male Variety Performer	Witch Hunt, Non-Summit	Nominated	
2016	MBC Entertainment Awards	MC Award	Duet Song Festival	Won	
2018	KBS Entertainment Awards	Excellence Award in Variety	Battle Trip	Won	
2020	Mnet Asian Music Awards	Best Collaboration	"First Winter" (with IU)	Nominated	
2020	Mnet Asian Music Awards	Song of the Year	"First Winter" (with IU)	Nominated	

=== Listicles ===
Sung Si-kyung on select listicles
Publisher	Year	Listicle	Ranking	Ref.
Forbes	2021	Korea Power Celebrity 40	29th	
Forbes	2024	Korea Power Celebrity 40	35th	
