= Kim Jong-min =

South Korean singer

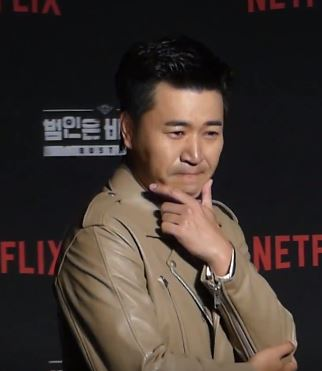
- Kim at a press conference for Busted! in April 2018
- Born: September 24, 1979 (age 47); Dobong-gu, Seoul, South Korea
- Occupations: Singer; dancer; television personality
- Spouse: Unknown (m. 2025)
- Musical career
- Genres: Hip-hop; dance
- Instrument: Vocals
- Years active: 2000–present
- Label: KYT Entertainment

Korean name
- Hangul: 김종민
- Hanja: 金鍾旼
- RR: Gim Jongmin
- MR: Kim Chongmin

Kim Jong-min (Korean: 김종민; born September 24, 1979) is a South Korean singer, dancer and television personality. He has been a member of the co-ed vocal group Koyote since 2000 and a cast member of the variety show 2 Days & 1 Night since 2007.

Kim has won numerous awards including the Grand Prize (Daesang) at the 2016 KBS Entertainment Awards for his work on 2 Days & 1 Night.

== Career ==
=== Pre-debut ===
Before debuting as a member of Koyote, Kim worked as a backup dancer for Uhm Jung-hwa, Lee Jung Hyun, Kim Wan-sun, R.E.F and many other artists. He was on the dance team "Friends" for five years.

=== Variety appearances ===
Kim is known for being a mainstay of many Korean variety shows (such as KBS' Heroine 6 and Choi Hong Man Strong Friends and formerly SBS' Real Romance Love Letter), as he has become a goofy, naïve on-screen character known for silly comments and actions. He was also an assistant soccer coach on KBS' FC Shoot Dori and has also made appearances on MBC's King Saturday Driving School and Happy Shares Company, SBS' Love Choice (Selection Couple), X-Man, and Ya Shim Man Man, and KBS' Star Golden Bell and Happy Together Friends.

In 2007, Kim became a cast member of KBS' Happy Sunday lineup as part of 1 Night 2 Days and has been with the program to date, being the only pioneer member who witnessed 1 Night 2 Days from Season 1 till Season 4. From November 2007 until December 2009, he served his mandatory military service as a public service worker. He was initially due to enlist in March but received a six-month postponement as his medical examination revealed a herniated disc, leading to him being assigned as a public service worker rather than in an army unit.

Kim won multiple awards during his television career, including the Best Entertainer Award at the 2013 SBS Entertainment Awards for Star King in 2013, the Top Excellence Award at the 2015 KBS Entertainment Awards for 1 Night 2 Days, and the Grand Prize Award for his commitment and loyalty with KBS 1 Night 2 Days at the 2016 KBS Entertainment Awards.

In September 2017, it was confirmed that Kim would be a fixed cast member in Netflix's variety show Busted!.

=== Solo career ===
In the first quarter of 2011, he released his very first single entitled "Oppa Find Strength". His promotional clip from the MV depicted the negative comments that he received after his return from military service.

He made his solo comeback on September 3, 2014, as he released his third single, "Sali Go Dali Go", an electronic dance music composed by DanDi. The music video of featured Chun Myung-hoon (NRG) and comedian Ahn Young-mi. His new track peaked at ranking number eight on China's popular music video sharing site, Yinyuetai.

== Personal life ==
Kim married his non-celebrity girlfriend, who is 11 years younger than him, on April 20, 2025.

== Discography ==
=== Singles ===
| Title | Year | Peak chart positions | Sales | Album |
| Title | Year | KOR | Sales | Album |
|---|---|---|---|---|
| "Oppa Find Strength" (오빠 힘내요) | 2011 | 60 | KOR: 173,004 | Non-album singles |
| "Pit-A-Pat" (두근두근) feat. Gilmi | 2012 | — | KOR: 39,986 | Non-album singles |
| "Sali Go Dali Go" (살리고 달리고) | 2014 | — | —N/a | Non-album singles |
| "The Path I Choose" (내가 선택한 길) feat. YDG | 2021 | — | —N/a | Non-album singles |
"—" denotes release did not chart.

=== Soundtrack appearances ===
| Title | Year | Peak chart positions | Sales | Album |
| Title | Year | KOR | Sales | Album |
|---|---|---|---|---|
| "I Need Your Love" with Tak Jae-hoon, Nine Muses | 2012 | — | —N/a | Music and Lyrics Season 2 OST |
| "Could I Love Again" (다시 만날 수 있을까) | 2018 | — | —N/a | Love Alert OST |
| "Happy People" (행복을 주는 사람) | 2018 | — | —N/a | Hometown Sounds Samcheok OST |
"—" denotes release did not chart.

== Filmography ==
=== Film ===
| Year | Title | Role | Notes | Ref. |
|---|---|---|---|---|
| 2002 | Emergency Act 19 | None | Cameo; Appeared with Koyote. | |
| 2010 | Autumn Destiny | Cheongmin | | |

=== Music video appearances ===
- Kang Ho-dong & Jeong Chae-eun — "Look Out of the Window"
- VASIA — "Love Story"
- Aurora — "따따블"
- Charlie & Shinba — "Good Zombie" (feat. Zingo)

=== Television series ===
| Year | Title | Role | Notes | Ref. |
|---|---|---|---|---|
| 2005 | Can We Refill the Love? | | Cameo | |
| 2012 | Reply 1997 | | Cameo (episode 5) | |
| 2012 | My Husband Got a Family | Kim Jong-min | Cameo (episode 46) | |
| 2012 | Seoyoung, My Daughter | Lee Seo-young's fake boyfriend | Cameo (episode 1) | |
| 2013 | Reply 1994 | Doctor and Senior of Garbage | Cameo (episode 5) | |
| 2014 | Plus Nine Boys | Gu Kwang-soo's younger generation | Cameo (episode 2) | |
| 2017 | Idol Drama Operation Team | Deliveryman | Cameo (episode 4) | |
| 2017 | Hit the Top | | Cameo (episode 8) | |
| 2020 | Gracious Revenge | | Cameo (episode 103) | |

=== Variety shows ===
==== Present shows ====
| Year | Title | Role | Notes/Ref. |
|---|---|---|---|
| 2018–present | Brain-fficial | MC | (Note: This is Kim Jong-min solo MC program. The show is broadcast on YouTube, Naver TV, and Facebook of History Korea. The program premiered on July 19, 2018.) |
| 2019–present | Those Who Cross the Line S3 | Cast Member | (Note: The program premiered on August 18, 2019.) |
| 2019–present | Happy Sunday: 2 Days & 1 Night Season 4 | Main Cast | (Note: Season 4 premiered on December 8, 2019.) |
| 2021–2022 | Tteokbokki House That Brother | Co-host | with Lee Yi-kyung and Jee Seok-jin |
| 2021–Present | My Little Old Boy | Main Cast | (Note: Kim Jong-min was invited back to the show in Episode 273, which aired on December 26, 2021.) |
| 2022–2023 | Golf Battle: Birdie Buddies | Contestant | Season 4–5 |
| 2023 | Show King Night | Judge | |

==== Former shows ====
| Year | Title | Role | Notes/Ref. |
|---|---|---|---|
| 2004 | Happy Sunday: Heroine 6 | Main Cast | (Note: The show originally aired on August 13, 2004 and ended on October 29, 2006.) |
| 2005 | Happy Sunday: Shooting Kid Season 1 | Main Cast | (Note: Kim Jong-min was given role as assistance coach.) |
| 2006 | Happy Sunday: Choi Hong-man and Strong Friends | Main Cast | (Note: The program originally aired on August 13, 2006 and ended on April 29, 2007.) |
| 2007 | Happy Sunday: Are You Ready? | Main Cast | (Note: The program originally aired on May 6, 2007 and ended on July 29, 2007.) |
| 2007 | Happy Sunday: 2 Days 1 Night Season 1 | Main Cast | (Note: Season 1 premiered on August 5, 2007 and ended on February 26, 2012.) |
| 2010 | Sweet Night | Main Cast | (Note: The program premiere on January 10, 2010 and ended on May 9, 2010.) |
| 2010 | Three Suspicious Men | Main Cast | (Note: Episodes aired from June 23 to August 5, 2010.) |
| 2010 | Dream Island | Cast | (Note: Episodes aired from November 27 to December 18, 2010.) |
| 2011 | Sumiok | Main Cast | (Note: First episode aired in April 2011.) |
| 2012 | Happy Sunday: 2 Days 1 Night Season 2 | Main Cast | (Note: Season 2 premiered on March 4, 2012 and ended on November 24, 2013.) |
| 2012 | Three Fools | Main Cast | (Note: Kim Jong-min reunited with his former colleagues from 2 Days 1 Night Season 1 (Lee Soo-geun & Eun Ji-won). The first episode aired on October 7, 2012.) |
| 2013 | Escape Crisis No. 1 | Special MC | (Note: Appeared on Episode 394 (July 29, 2013).) |
| 2014 | I'm Going to School | Cast Member | Appeared on Episodes 1–5 (Sunjung High School) • 6–9 (Shinjang High School) |
| 2015 | Shin Dong Yup's Bachelor Party | Cast | Episodes: 1–12 |
| 2015 | Law of the Jungle in Indochina | Cast Member | Part of second half tribe member. Episode 158–162. |
| 2016 | Good Life | Host | Appeared on Episode 53–103. |
| 2016 | God's Workplace | Pilot Cast | SBS 2016 Pilot Program |
| 2016 | Go PD Lee Kyung-kyu | Cast Member | Appeared on Episode 1–10 (Note: (From September 7 to November 9, 2016).) |
| 2016 | Master of Straight | | Appeared on Episode 1–6 (Note: (Broadcast began from September 29, 2016).) |
| 2017 | My Little Old Boy | Special Host | (Note: Kim Jong-min appeared as Special Host on Episode 21–22 (January 20 & January 27, 2017).) |
| 2017 | Boat Horn Clenched Fists (Pilot Program) | Pilot Cast | SBS 2017 Pilot Program |
| 2017 | Just Friends (Pilot Program) | Pilot Cast | (Note: Broadcast date is July 12 to 26, 2017. Kim Jong-min cast with Shin Ji (Koyote) for a filming in Thailand (Khao Lak). Just Friends — A program where male and female celebrities who are known for their friendship are going on a honeymoon trip to Khao Lak, Thailand. In this reality show, the age-old question of male-female friendship validity will be tested on a whole new level.) |
| 2017 | Order & Cook | Main Cast | (Note: Aired on March 13 to April 17, 2017.) |
| 2017 | Countryside Bakery | Main Cast | (Note: The program premiered on September 7, 2017 and ended on November 25, 2017.) |
| 2017 | My Little Old Boy | Special Cast | (Note: Kim Jong-min appeared as special cast on Episode 56–57 (October 1 & October 7, 2017). These episodes focus on Kim Jong-min clumsy image and concerns about his health. Thus taking numerous of supplements and vitamins.) |
| 2017 | Master Key | Main Cast | Episode: 1–3 • 8–9 • 11–12. |
| 2017 | 1% Friendship (Pilot Program) | Pilot Cast | (Note: Chuseok Special. Aired on October 5, 2017. The show became permanent on March 3, 2018. However Kim Jong-min did not participate on permanent program.) |
| 2017 | One Night Sleepover Trip (Pilot Program) | Pilot Cast | (Note: Chuseok Special. Aired on October 9, 2017. (This episode was not aired at KBS World's YouTube channel)) |
| 2018 | Box Life | Pilot Cast | Pilot program (Note: Aired on January 10, 2018 and ended on January 11, 2018.) |
| 2018 | Live a Good Life | Main Cast | The program premiered on January 19, 2018, and ended on March 16, 2018. |
| 2018 | One Night Sleepover Trip | Main Cast | (Note: The first episode aired on February 27, 2018.) |
| 2018 | Law of the Jungle in Patagonia | Cast Member | Part of second half tribe member. Episodes: 305–310 |
| 2018 | Great Escape Season 1 | Cast Member | (Note: The series premiered on July 1, 2018 and ended on September 23, 2018.) |
| 2018 | Human Intelligence | Cast Member | |
| 2018 | Hometown Sounds Samcheok (동네앨범) | Cast Member | (Note: The program premiered on October 28, 2018 and ended on November 17, 2018.) |
| 2018 – 2019 | My English Puberty 100 Hours | Cast Member | (Note: The program premiered on December 20, 2018 and ended on February 21, 2019.) |
| 2018 – 2019 | Taste of Dating Season 1 | Cast Member | (Note: The program premiered on September 16, 2018 and ended on February 21, 2019.) |
| 2019 | Gotcha! | MC | (Note: The program premiered on March 11 and ended on April 1, 2019.) |
| 2019 | We Will Channel You | MC | (Note: Kim Jong-min joined the show on March 7, 2019 to May 9, 2019.) |
| 2019 | Great Escape Season 2 | Main Cast | (Note: The program premiered on March 17 and ended on June 9, 2019.) |
| 2019 | Earthian Live | Cast Member | (Note: The program premiered on March 29 and ended on June 14, 2019.) |
| 2019 | Prison Life of Fools | Cast | (Note: The program premiered on March 16, 2019 and ended on September 7, 2019.) |
| 2019 | The Night of Hate Comments | MC | (Note: The program premiered on June 21 and ended on October 11, 2019.) |
| 2013 – 2019 | Happy Sunday: 2 Days & 1 Night Season 3 | Main Cast | Season 3 (Note: premiered on December 1, 2013 and ended on March 10, 2019.) |
| 2019 – 2020 | Naturally | Cast | (Note: The program premiered on August 3, 2019 and ended on May 30, 2020.) |
| 2020 | K-pop Cultural Center | Host | (Note: The program premiered on February 10 and ended on March 23, 2020.) |
| 2020 | Great Escape Season 3 | Main Cast | (Note: The program premiered on March 1 and ended on June 14, 2020.) |
| 2020 | Idol on Quiz | Fixed Cast/Temporary MC | Episode 7-18 (Senior-dols) & 19-20 (Temporary MC) (Note: The program premiered in 2020.) |
| 2020–2021 | Hangout with Yoo | Guest | (Note: Appeared on Episode 59-68 (Manager for Refund Sisters), 69 (Kimchi Expedition Team), 70-71 (H&H Corporation), 72-present (Winter Songs Resurrection Plan).) |
| 2021 | Upgrade Human | MC | |
| 2021 | Great Escape Season 4 | Main Cast | (Note: The program premiered on July 11, 2021 and ended on October 3, 2021.) |
| 2021 | I'm Going to Meet You | Host | |
| 2022–2023 | Saturday Meals Love | Cast Member | |

=== Web shows ===
| Year | Title | Role | Notes | Ref. |
|---|---|---|---|---|
| 2018–2021 | Busted! | Main Cast | Season 1–3 (Note: Season 1 The program premiered on May 4, 2018 and ended on June 1, 2018.) (Note: Season 2 The program premiered on November 8, 2019.) | |
| 2018 | We Have a New Dad | Main Cast | Season 2–3 | (Note: Season 3 The series premiered on July 9, 2018 and ended on August 30, 2018.) |
| 2020–2021 | Kim Dumb | Host | with Kim Jun-ho | (Note: The program premiered on May 1, 2020 and the last episode was published on February 26, 2021.) |
| 2021 | Sold Out King | Host | | |
| 2021 | Pong Disparue | Host | with Lee Chan-won | |
| 2022 | Idol Hit Song Festival | Host | with Shin Ji | |
| 2022 | The Door: To Wonderland | Cast Member | Season 1–2 | |
| 2022–2023 | Benefit | Host | with Satire | |

== Other activities ==
=== PR Ambassador ===
- 2016 – PR Ambassador of Dobong-gu for two years.

== Accolades ==
=== Awards and nominations ===
Name of the award ceremony, year presented, category, nominee of the award, and the result of the nomination
| Award ceremony | Year | Category | Nominee / Work | Result | Ref. |
|---|---|---|---|---|---|
| Baeksang Arts Awards | 2017 | Best Variety Performer – Male | 2 Days & 1 Night | Nominated | |
| Brand Customer Loyalty Awards | 2020 | Entertainer Award | Kim Jong-min | Won | |
| KBS Entertainment Awards | 2006 | Top Entertainer Award | Happy Sunday: Heroine 6 | Won | |
| KBS Entertainment Awards | 2011 | Grand Prize (Daesang) (shared with other cast members) | 2 Days & 1 Night | Won | |
| KBS Entertainment Awards | 2014 | Top Excellence Award for Variety Show | 2 Days & 1 Night | Nominated | |
| KBS Entertainment Awards | 2015 | Top Excellence Award for Variety Show | 2 Days & 1 Night | Won | |
| KBS Entertainment Awards | 2016 | Grand Prize (Daesang) | 2 Days & 1 Night | Won | |
| KBS Entertainment Awards | 2018 | Top Excellence Award for Variety Show | 2 Days & 1 Night | Nominated | |
| KBS Entertainment Awards | 2018 | Best Couple Award | Kim Jong-min with Kim Joon-ho; 2 Days & 1 Night | Won | |
| KBS Entertainment Awards | 2020 | Grand Prize (Daesang) | 2 Days & 1 Night; Idol on Quiz | Nominated | |
| KBS Entertainment Awards | 2021 | Grand Prize (Daesang) | 2 Days & 1 Night Season 4 | Nominated | |
| KBS Entertainment Awards | 2021 | Entertainer of the Year | 2 Days & 1 Night Season 4 | Won | |
| KBS Entertainment Awards | 2022 | Entertainer of the Year | 2 Days & 1 Night Season 4 | Won | |
| KBS Entertainment Awards | 2022 | Grand Prize (Daesang) | 2 Days & 1 Night Season 4 | Nominated | |
| KBS Entertainment Awards | 2023 | Entertainer of the Year (shared with other cast members) | 2 Days & 1 Night Season 4 | Won | |
| KBS Entertainment Awards | 2023 | Grand Prize (Daesang) (shared with other cast members) | 2 Days & 1 Night Season 4 | Won | |
| KBS Entertainment Awards | 2024 | Grand Prize (Daesang) | 2 Days & 1 Night Season 4 | Nominated | |
| KBS Entertainment Awards | 2024 | Entertainer of the Year | 2 Days & 1 Night Season 4 | Won | |
| KBS Entertainment Awards | 2024 | Producer Special Award | 2 Days & 1 Night Season 4 | Won | |
| KBS Entertainment Awards | 2025 | Entertainer of the Year | 2 Days & 1 Night Season 4 | Won | |
| KBS Entertainment Awards | 2025 | Grand Prize (Daesang) | 2 Days & 1 Night Season 4 | Nominated | |
| MBC Entertainment Awards | 2019 | Excellence Award in Variety Category (Male) | Those Who Cross the Line | Nominated | |
| MBC Entertainment Awards | 2020 | Best Couple Award | Kim Jong-min with Jung Jae-hyung; Hangout with Yoo | Nominated | |
| MBC Entertainment Awards | 2020 | Excellence Award in Music/Talk Category (Male) | Those Who Cross the Line; Hangout with Yoo; The People of Trot | Won | |
| MBC Entertainment Awards | 2021 | Popularity Award | Those Who Cross the Line; Hangout with Yoo | Won | |
| MBC Entertainment Awards | 2023 | Popularity Award (Show/Variety) | One Top (with Yoo Jae-suk, Haha (entertainer), Lee Yi-kyung, Young K and Joo Woo-jae); Hangout with Yoo | Won | |
| SBS Entertainment Awards | 2013 | Best Entertainer Award | Star King | Won | |
| SBS Entertainment Awards | 2023 | Top Excellence Award (Male Category) | My Little Old Boy, Golf Battle: Birdie Buddies | Won | |

=== Listicle ===
Name of publisher, year listed, name of listicle, and placement
| Publisher | Year | List | Placement | Ref. |
|---|---|---|---|---|
| KBS | 2023 | The 50 people who made KBS shine | 15th | |
