= One Night Sleepover Trip =

South Korean reality television show

- Hangul: 하룻밤만 재워줘
- Lit.: Let Me Sleep For One Night
- RR: Harutbamman jaewo jwo
- MR: Haruppamman chaewŏ chwŏ
- Genre: Reality television
- Starring: Kim Jong-min; Lee Sang-min
- Country of origin: South Korea
- Original language: Korean
- No. of seasons: 1
- No. of episodes: 16 + 1 (pilot)

Production
- Camera setup: Multicamera setup
- Running time: Approximately 1 hours 30 minutes (90 minutes)

Original release
- Network: KBS2
- Release: October 9, 2017 – June 12, 2018

One Night Sleepover Trip (Korean: 하룻밤만 재워줘) is a South Korean reality television show. It is distributed by KBS2. Originally, it was a Chuseok show, but after favorable reviews of its pilot episode, it became a permanent weekly show on 27 February and ended on 12 June 2018. KBS World then picked it up as One Night Sleepover Trip, including English subtitles.

== Plot ==
In the show, South Korean entertainers Kim Jong-min and Lee Sang-min travel around the world couch surfing - staying at local's houses for one night. No preparations were done, so part of each episode involves finding a place to stay. During the stay, they learn about different cultures and share Korean traditions.

== Cast ==
=== Hosts ===
- Kim Jong-min
- Lee Sang-min

== Episodes ==
Episode #	Broadcast Date	Cast(s)	Guest(s)	Country	Note(s)
Pilot	October 9, 2017	Kim Jong-min; Lee Sang-min	Marta's Family	Italy	Chuseok Special (This episode was not aired at KBS World's YouTube channel)
1	February 27, 2018	Kim Jong-min; Lee Sang-min	Marta's Family	South Korea	Marta's family have been invited to South Korea, they stayed in Jong Min's house.
2	March 6, 2018	Kim Jong-min; Lee Sang-min	Marta's Family	South Korea	Special appearances by Koyote, Clon and Big Bang
3	March 13, 2018	Kim Jong-min; Lee Tae-gon	Dani & Rose	Spain	Special appearances by Marc Clotet and Natailia Sanchez; Barcelona v. Spain match
4	March 20, 2018	Kim Jong-min; Lee Tae-gon	Dani & Rose	Spain	Special appearance by Han Bo-reum
5	March 27, 2018	Kim Jong-min; Lee Sun-bin; Lee Sang-min; Jo Jae-yoon	Esther's Family	England	University of Oxford
6	April 3, 2018	Kim Jong-min; Lee Sun-bin; Lee Sang-min; Jo Jae-yoon	Esther's Family	England	
7	April 10, 2018	Kim Jong-min; Lee Sun-bin; Lee Sang-min; Jo Jae-yoon	Karen & Dilek	England	
8	April 17, 2018	Kim Jong-min; Lee Sun-bin; Lee Sang-min; Jo Jae-yoon	Karen & Dilek	England	Special appearance by Michael, an Englishman they met in the pilot episode.
9	April 24, 2018	Kim Jong-min; Lee Sun-bin; Lee Sang-min; Jo Jae-yoon	Michael's Family	England	
10	May 1, 2018	Kim Jong-min; Lee Tae-gon; Han Bo-reum	Juan's Family	Spain	
11	May 8, 2018	Kim Jong-min; Lee Tae-gon; Han Bo-reum	Juan's Family	Spain	
12	May 15, 2018	Lee Sang-min; Jo Jae-yoon	Park Hang-seo	Vietnam	
13	May 22, 2018	Lee Sang-min; Jo Jae-yoon	Yui Family	Vietnam	
14	May 29, 2018	Kim Jong-min; Lee Sang-min; Ryu Hyun-kyung; Zhong Chenle	Chenle's Family	Shanghai, China	
15	June 5, 2018	Kim Jong-min; Lee Sang-min; Ryu Hyun-kyung	Joy's Family	Shanghai, China	
16	June 12, 2018	Kim Jong-min; Lee Sang-min	Dani, Rose, Marc & Natalia	South Korea	Season Finale; One Night Sleepover Trip Special Part 2

== Ratings ==
- In the table below, the blue numbers represent the lowest ratings and the red numbers represent the highest ratings.
- N/A denotes that the rating is not known.

Episode #	Broadcast Date	Ratings (Nationwide)	
Episode #	Broadcast Date	AGB Nielsen	TNMS
Pilot	October 9, 2017	—N/a	5.5% (Part 1); 10.1% (Part 2)
1	February 27, 2018	4.8%	4.8%
2	March 6, 2018	4.9%	4.5%
3	March 13, 2018	3.7%	3.3%
4	March 20, 2018	2.8%	2.8%
5	March 27, 2018	3.3%	3.4%
6	April 3, 2018	3.1%	3.1%
7	April 10, 2018	3.5%	2.7%
8	April 17, 2018	3.5%	3.4%
9	April 24, 2018	3.4%	3.9%
10	May 1, 2018	2.9%	3.2%
11	May 8, 2018	2.5%	2.1%
12	May 15, 2018	3.2%	3.2%
13	May 22, 2018	2.8%	3.5%
14	May 29, 2018	2.8%	3.0%
15	June 5, 2018	5.1%	5.3%
16	June 12, 2018	5.1%	—N/a
