= Lee Sang-min (singer) =

South Korean singer (born 1973)

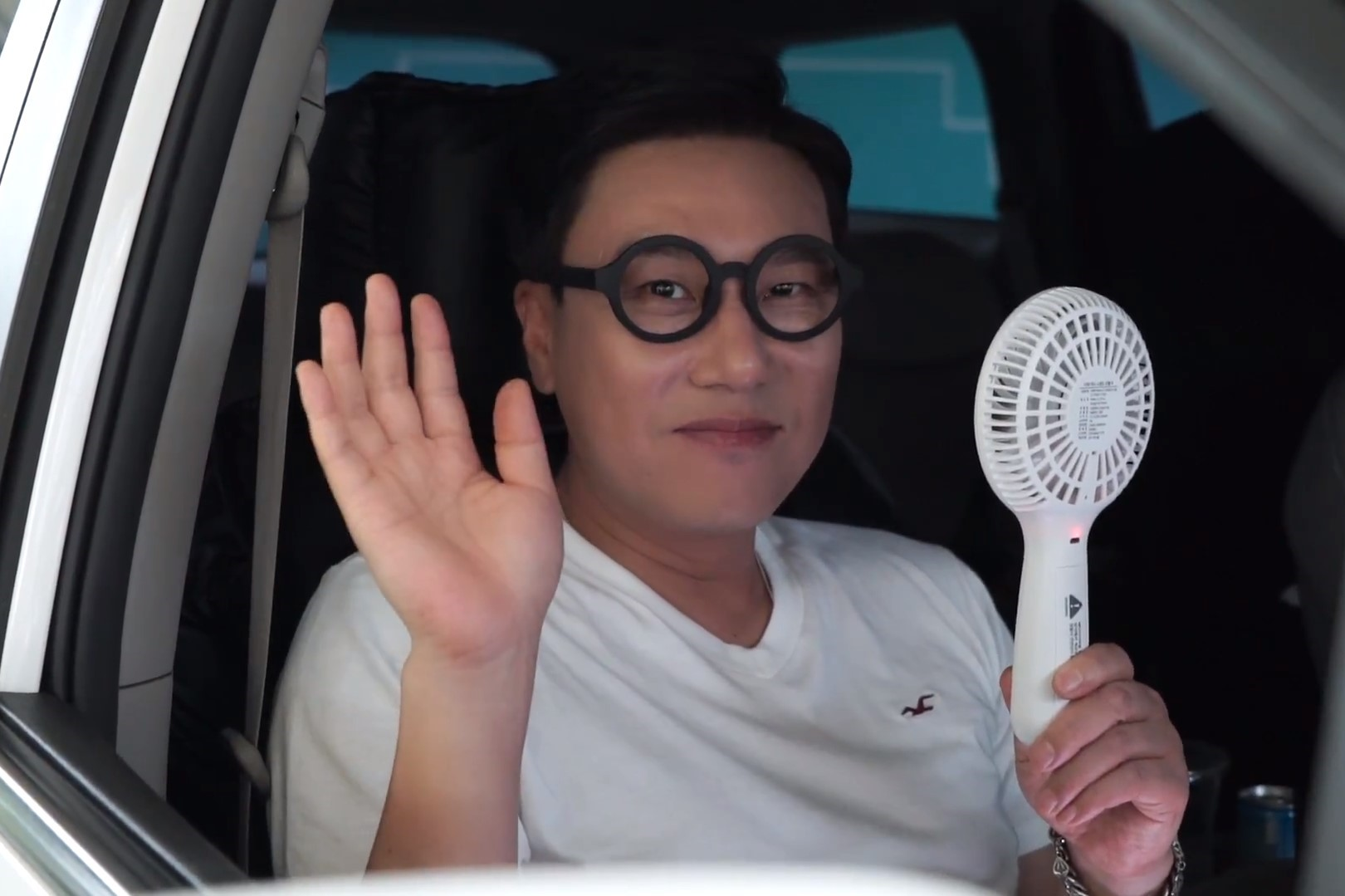
- Lee in 2017
- Born: June 24, 1973 (age 53); Yeongdeungpo District, Seoul, South Korea
- Occupations: Singer; songwriter; record producer; television host
- Criminal charges: Spent 3 years of probation and got fined 210 million won in 2009.
- Spouses: Lee Hye-young (m. 2004; div. 2005); Unknown (m. 2025)
- Musical career
- Genres: K-pop; hip hop; dance
- Instrument: Vocals
- Years active: 1994–present
- Label: Dmost Entertainment

Korean name
- Hangul: 이상민
- Hanja: 李尙敏
- RR: I Sangmin
- MR: I Sangmin

Lee Sang-min (Korean: 이상민; Hanja: 李尙敏; born June 24, 1973) is a South Korean singer, songwriter, record producer and television personality. He is a former member of the hip hop and dance group Roo'ra. He is also best known for being a cast member of the variety shows Knowing Bros and My Little Old Boy.

== Early life ==
Lee Sang-min was born on June 24, 1973. Circumstances regarding his living situation made his family unable to record him on the South Korean family register for two years—his birthdate there was officially registered as February 3, 1975. When Lee was six years old, his father died, and his mother worked various odd jobs to make a living. Lee first started thinking about becoming a singer after graduating high school, when he saw singers in person for the first time at a club called Moon Night. Dreaming of a singing career, he rented out a practice room and trained his skills with Shin Jung-hwan, an acquaintance who would join Roo'ra with him. He graduated high school in 1991; in 1995, he took the Korean CSAT, aiming to study music theory at college. He was admitted to Seoul Institute of the Arts in 1996 with a major in film, as he wanted to learn about film music.

== Career ==
=== Roo'ra ===
Lee started his career as a member of the Korean pop group Roo'ra. He was the leader and rapper of the group, and his shouting rap (crying rap) made him popular. In 1996, when several songs from Roo'ra's third album were accused of plagiarism, Lee was reported to have attempted suicide. The injury did not put his life in danger, but he was admitted to the hospital and had his arm stitched. One of the songs accused of being copied was one Lee had written in memory of Kim Sung-jae, who had died a few months before—this was cited as the reason for Lee's attempt. Lee later confessed that it was not a suicide attempt, and that Roo'ra's manager had seen him punching a mirror and mistook it for a suicide attempt. After the incident, Roo'ra spent time in Los Angeles, where they prepared their 4th album alongside Lee Hyun-do. The album included the song "Ah! Ja!", which was composed by Lee Sang-min. After changing members early in 1997, Roo'ra disbanded, releasing a farewell album that included nine songs composed by Lee.

=== Producing and business ventures ===
Lee's first producing work was with the group Sohodae in 1997, where he participated as a producer on their first album. The next year, he put together the duo Country Kko Kko, composed of soloist Tak Jae-hoon and former Roo'ra member Shin Jung-hwan. Lee stated in 2013 that he earned 4 billion won per year during his heyday as a producer, overseeing artists such as Diva and Chakra. In 2000, he founded the production company Sangmind, which represented artists such as Kim Ji-hyun, Baek Ji-young, and Green Area.

In 2004, Lee opened the first branch of Gimme Five, a restaurant that combined drag shows, music performances, MMA matches, and various other forms of entertainment. The restaurant saw success in its first year; monthly sales averaged at 1 billion won, while 300,000 customers had visited by December. He was kicked from his spot as CEO in February 2005 after he refused to put a gambling machine in the establishment, and plans for a second branch were dropped after the death of a fighter. The restaurant's failure landed Lee in debts of 6.9 billion won (US$6,200,000).

=== Return to entertainment ===
Lee returned to the entertainment industry in 2012 with the mockumentary The God of Music, which centered around Lee forming an idol group under his company LSM Entertainment. On July 4, 2012, he released the project album "The God of Music — The First", and the following day he performed its lead single "As Time Goes" on M Countdown.

On April 3, 2017, it was announced that Lee would join the reality show My Little Old Boy, replacing film critic Heo Ji-woong. His first appearance on the show was on April 16, 2017.

On March 27, 2018, MBC Every1 announced that Lee would be joining the cast of Weekly Idol as a host, following a revamp to the series.

On April 11, 2018, Mnet announced that Lee was going to join the upcoming music TV program The Call as a host.

On December 18, 2021, Lee, along with the rest of the My Little Old Boy team, won the Grand Prize (Daesang) at the 2021 SBS Entertainment Awards.

In April 2023, it was announced that Lee would return to the panel of the reality TV show Heart Signal after three years of the series being off air.

== Personal life ==
On June 19, 2004, Lee married actress and singer Lee Hye-young, whom he met in the U.S. in 1996 and dated for seven years. However, on August 8, 2005, the couple divorced, stating personality differences. In August 2006, Lee was sued by his ex-wife for fraud charges and taking about 2.2 billion won prior to their marriage and until their divorce. In the suit, Lee Hye-young claimed that her ex-husband bought a Volvo worth 80 million won and a BMW worth 100 million won under her name, for which he did not repay the installment debt and caused money to be seized from her broadcasting payment and bank account. In the suit, Lee also claimed that her ex-husband forced her to pose as a nude model for business purposes, taking 50 million won (~$50,000) for the contract and 30 million won (~$30,000) worth of benefits from the project. On November 28, 2006, Lee Hye-young dropped the charges against her ex-husband.

In December 2006, the police arrested Lee on the suspicion of operating a gambling website and receiving 210 million won in proceeds. In 2009, he was sentenced to one and a half years in prison. However, Lee appealed the ruling, and was then sentenced to 3 years in probation, 160 hours in community service, and 210 million won in fines.

In 2019, Lee was investigated and accused of embezzling 1.23 billion Won ($1,082,756.82 USD) in fees in 2014. In 2021, he denounced the accusations as a "malicious threat" and was never charged.

On May 1, 2025, Lee announced that he had registered his marriage with his non-celebrity wife.

== Discography ==
- Blues Along the Way (2018)

== Filmography ==
=== Film ===
Year	Title	Role
2014	The Con Artists	Skyscraper guard #7
2015	Empire of Lust	Unidentified assailant
2015	The Tiger: An Old Hunter's Tale	Metal rifle retrieval troop #1 (cameo)
2016	Asura: The City of Madness	Sung Min
2017	The Prison	Wuhan construction man on watch duty
2019	The Skill of Remarriage	Suit designer (cameo)

=== TV series ===
Year	Show	Role	Notes/Ref.
2005	Gae Jo Is Barefoot	Himself	Screenwriter
2017	Go Back	Himself	Episode 7 (cameo)
2021	The Penthouse: War in Life 2	Prison Guard Jo	Episode 13 (cameo)
2021	The Penthouse: War in Life 3	Prison Guard Jo	Episode 1 (cameo)

=== Variety shows ===
Off-Air On-Air

Year	Show	Notes/Ref.
2012	The God of Music	Member of an ensemble cast
2013	The Genius: Rules of the Game	Semi-finalist, 3rd place (eliminated in episode 11)
2013–2014	The Genius: Rule Breaker	Show winner
2014	With You	Co-starred with Sayuri Fujita
2014	Share House	Permanent cast
2014	Entertainer Lives in My House	Episodes 1–2
2015	The Genius: Grand Final	Finished in 11th place (eliminated in episode 3)
2015–2016	Time Out	Regular member
2015–2016	Bangshipop	Regular member
2015–2016	I Can See Your Voice: Season 2	Tone-deaf detective
2016	The God of Music 2	Member of an ensemble cast
2016	I Can See Your Voice: Season 3	Tone-deaf detective
2016	Finding Momoland	Main host
2016	Law of the Jungle in East Timor	Singers' Special (1st half)
2016	Singderella	Special MC (ep. 15–16)
2016	Battle Trip	Contestant with Kim Il-jung (episode 7)
2016	Immortal Songs 2	Roo'ra Special (episode 263)
2016	King of Mask Singer	Competed under the "Rational Reason Apollo" identity (episode 63)
2016	Future Diary	
2016	Sing Street	Permanent cast
2016	Please Take Care of My Refrigerator	Chef (ep. 86–87)
2016	Rumor Has It	MC
2016–2017	Singing Battle	Team leader (ep. 1–3, 6–9, 16–29)
2016–present	Knowing Bros	Member of the permanent ensemble cast (ep. 14–present)
2017	King of Mask Singer	Episodes 107–108 (as a panel member)
2017	I Can See Your Voice: Season 4	Tone-deaf detective
2017	Oppa Thinking	Permanent cast (leader for the Team 2)
2017	Heart Signal	Cast member
2017	The Bunker 8	Host
2017–2018	It's Okay To Go A Little Crazy	Host
2017–2018	Where Is Mr. Kim Season 1-2	Cast member
2017–2020	Section TV	Main MC
2017–present	My Little Old Boy	Cast member (ep. 32–present)
2018	I Can See Your Voice: Season 5	Tone-deaf detective
2018	One Night Sleepover Trip	Permanent cast
2018	Heart Signal 2	Celebrity panelist
2018	The Call	Main host with Yoo Se-yoon
2018	Reckless but Happy	Cast member
2018	In A Moment - Lee Restaurant	Cast member
2018	I Have Something To Say Today	
2018	Gourmet Road Season 4	
2018	Weekly Idol	Host (ep. 350–388)
2018	Lunch Time	Cast member
2018–2019	The Fan	Mentor
2018–present	A Man Running a Chart	
2019	I Can See Your Voice: Season 6	Tone-deaf detective
2019	Sky Castle Special	Host
2019	One Pick Road	Host
2019	Shopping Mall (Season 1,2)	Host
2019	Not the Same Person You Used to Know V2	Non-related observer
2019	Where is My Home?	
2019–2021	Eye Contact	Host
2020	Heart Signal 3	Panelist
2020	K-pop Cultural Center	Main host
2020	War of Villains	Main host
2020	Meat-party Talks	Cast
2020	Top 10 Student	Panel
2020	Roofless Dining Table	
2020–2021	People of Trot	Cast member
2021		New Year's Special
2021	Friends	Host
2021	Ho Dong's Camping Zone: Let's Choose	Regular Member
2021	Birth of a Rich Man	Host
2021	Good.R.Sam	Host
2021	Duck Tech	Host
2021–2022	Game of Blood	Host
2021–2022	Golden Time Signal	Host
2021–present	Dolsing Fourmen	Host
2021–present	Altoran	Host
2022	War of the Roses	Host
2022	Local Dining Table	MC
2022	War of the Roses	Host
2023	Heart Signal 4	Panelist
2023	Show King Night	Judge

=== Hosting ===
Year	Title	Notes	Ref.
2017	2017 SBS Entertainment Awards	with Jun Hyun-moo and Choo Ja-hyun	
2019	One K Concert (Note: Held at the National Assembly to commemorate the centennial of the March 1st Movement. The event was broadcast live on SBS Plus, SBS funE, and SBS MTV.)	with Cha Eun-woo and Kim Se-jeong	
2023	2023 SBS Entertainment Awards	with Kim Ji-eun and Lee Hyun-yi	

== Ambassadorship ==
- Busan's footwear industry ambassador (2022)

== Awards and nominations ==
Year	Award	Category	Nominated work	Result	Ref.
2017	2017 MBC Entertainment Awards	MC Award	Section TV	Won	
2017	2017 SBS Entertainment Awards	Rookie Award in Show/Talk	My Little Old Boy	Won	
2018	54th Baeksang Arts Awards	Best Variety Performer (Male)	My Little Old Boy	Nominated	
2018	12th SBS Entertainment Awards	Excellence Award in Show/Talk	My Little Old Boy, The Fan, Reckless but Happy	Won	
2018	18th MBC Entertainment Awards	Excellence Award in Music/Talk (Male)	Section TV, Cafeteria	Nominated	
2018	18th MBC Entertainment Awards	Best Entertainer Award in Music/Talk	Section TV, Cafeteria	Won	
2019	13th SBS Entertainment Awards	Best Couple Award (with Tak Jae-hoon)	My Little Old Boy	Won	
2020	14th SBS Entertainment Awards	Top Excellence Award in Reality Category	My Little Old Boy	Won	
2021	15th SBS Entertainment Awards	Grand Prize (Daesang) (Note: with Shin Dong-yup, Seo Jang-hoon, Cho Hye-seon, Kim Sun-ja, Park Young-hye, Tak Jae-hoon, Im Won-hee, Kim Joon-ho, Kim Jong-kook, Kim Hee-chul, Lee Tae-sung, Oh Min-suk, Park Goon, Choi Jin-hyuk)	My Little Old Boy	Won	
2021	15th SBS Entertainment Awards	Entertainer of the Year Award	My Little Old Boy, Dolsing Fourmen	Won	
2022	16th SBS Entertainment Awards	Lifetime Achievement Award	My Little Old Boy, Dolsing Fourmen	Won	
2022	16th SBS Entertainment Awards	Honorary Employee Award	My Little Old Boy, Dolsing Fourmen	Won	
2023	17th SBS Entertainment Awards	Grand Prize (Daesang)	My Little Old Boy, Dolsing Fourmen	Nominated	
2023	17th SBS Entertainment Awards	2023 SBS's Son	My Little Old Boy, Dolsing Fourmen	Won	
2023	17th SBS Entertainment Awards	Golden Solo Award	Dolsing Fourmen	Won	
2025	19th SBS Entertainment Awards	Grand Prize (Daesang)	Lee Sang-min	Won	
