= Great Escape (South Korean TV series) =

Korean television program

- Promotional poster of the fourth season
- Also known as: Big Escape
- Hangul: 대탈출
- Hanja: 大逃出
- RR: Daetalchul
- MR: Taet'alch'ul
- Genre: Reality television, Room Escape
- Created by: Jung Jong-yeon
- Written by: Kim Jung-sun, Park Seon-yu, Jung Da-hee, Heo Jung-hee
- Directed by: Yi Chan-hyun, Choi Yoon-hee, Kim Sae-hee, Ha Moo-sung
- Starring: Various artistes
- Country of origin: South Korea
- Original language: Korean
- No. of seasons: 4
- No. of episodes: 52 + 1 special (list of episodes)

Production
- Producers: Rhee Myoung-Han, Kim Sock-hyun, Kim Joon-hoon
- Production location: South Korea
- Cinematography: Shin Sung-hwan
- Camera setup: Multi-camera
- Running time: 60–90 minutes
- Production company: tvN

Original release
- Network: tvN
- Release: 1 July 2018 – 3 October 2021

Great Escape (Korean: 대탈출; RR: Daetalchul) is a South Korean reality show that premiered on tvN on 1 July 2018. The show features large-scale themed escape rooms, with a team of celebrities finding clues and solving puzzles in order to successfully escape.

The show ran for 4 seasons, featuring the same cast and airing every Sunday at 10:40pm (KST).

- Season 1: 1 July to 23 September 2018
- Season 2: 17 March to 9 June 2019
- Season 3: 1 March to 14 June 2020
- Season 4: 11 July to 3 October 2021

The show's slogan is "나가야산다", literally meaning 'escape to survive'.

== Overview ==
=== Season 1 ===
Each escape challenge has a different theme, and members uncover the storyline by discovering clues as they progress through different areas of the large-scale escape room. New areas are unlocked by finding and solving puzzles or accomplishing tasks, eventually leading the members to the final exit. In addition, members may have to interact with NPCs and/or assist them in order to proceed further. No time limit is stipulated for each challenge, which ends only when all members, and NPCs if any, successfully escape.

The escape locations are kept unknown to the members at the start of each challenge. They are transported there in a bus with blackout windows, and blindfolded before being escorted to the starting point.

Beginning with the second challenge, a team captain (주장 jujang) is assigned before the members arrive at the escape location, based on the best-performing member in the previous challenge.

=== Season 2 ===
Rule changes introduced include:

- Possibility of failure to escape (e.g. if a critical task is failed), with the challenge ending immediately
- Possibility of individual elimination during the challenge (e.g. if they "die" or go "missing" in the storyline), with the surviving member(s) continuing without the eliminated member(s)
- Removal of captain (주장) assignment

=== Season 3 ===
There is no change in the rules from season 2. Between 12 and 26 April 2020, no new episodes were aired as filming of the show was postponed due to COVID-19.

=== Season 4 ===
With the tagline of "Post-Earth adventure" (탈 지구급 어드벤처), this season introduced the concept of the DTCU, or Great Escape Universe. This universe contains several running storylines and world settings that string together multiple escape challenges across the four seasons.

=== Season 5 (The Story) ===
Kim Jong-min, Shindong, and P.O were replaced by Go Kyung-pyo, Baekhyun, and Yeo Jin-goo.

== Cast ==
=== Main Cast ===
Name	Seasons
Kang Ho-dong	1-Present
Kim Dong-hyun	1-Present
Yoo Byung-jae	1-Present
Kim Jong-min (Koyote)	1-4
Shindong (Super Junior)	1-4
P.O (Block B)	1-4
Go Kyung-pyo	5-Present
Baekhyun (Exo)	5-Present
Yeo Jin-goo	5-Present

=== Guests ===
Name	Episode	Notes
Yang Bae-cha	Season 1, Episode 6	
Jang Dong-min	Season 1, Episode 9-10	
Yoo Min-sang	Season 2, Episode 5-6	
Moon Se-yoon	Season 2, Episode 5-6	
Lee Jang-won (Peppertones)	Season 2, Episode 11-12	
Kim Ji-seok	Season 2, Episode 11-12	
Ha Seok-jin	Season 2, Episode 11-12; Season 3, Episode 12	

== Episodes ==
=== Season 1 ===
List of episodes (season 1)

Episode #	Challenge #	Original airdate	Theme	Content	Leader/Captain (주장)
1	—N/a	1 July 2018	Team Meeting	Members meet in advance and are interviewed individually	None
1	1	1 July 2018	Private Gambling Hall (사설 도박장)	1. Warehouse (창고); 2. Secret Room (비밀의 방); 3. President's Room (사장실); 4. CCTV Room (CCTV롬)	None
2	1	8 July 2018	Private Gambling Hall (사설 도박장)	5. VIP Game Room (VIP 게임룸); 6. Pawnshop (전당포); 7. Large Game Room (대형 게임룸); 8. Security Conveyor (보안 검색대); Escape successfully!!!	None
3	2	15 July 2018	Abandoned Hospital (폐병원)	1. Hospital Room (입원실); 2. Second Floor Corridor (2층 복도); 3. Restaurant (식당); 4. Director's Office (원장실)	Shindong
4	2	22 July 2018	Abandoned Hospital (폐병원)	4. Director's Office (원장실); 5. Secret Room (비밀의 방); 6. First Floor Lobby (1층 로비); 7. Security Room (보안실); 8. First Laboratory (제1연구실); 9. Secret Laboratory (비밀연구실); 10. Temptation of Recorder (유혹의 리코더); Escape successfully!!!	Shindong
5	3	29 July 2018	Korea Genome Bank (유전자 은행)	1. Waiting Room (대기실); 2. Zone A (A구역); 3. Zone B (B구역); 4. Analytical Room (분석실); 5. Zone D (D구역); 6. DNA Storage (DNA 저장소)	Kang Ho-dong
6	3	5 August 2018	Korea Genome Bank (유전자 은행)	7. Zone E (E구역); 8. Zone C (C구역); Escape successfully!!!; Special appearance: Yang Bae-cha	Kang Ho-dong
6	4	5 August 2018	Evil Prison (악령감옥) (Villa of Shaman 천해명)	1. Third Floor (3층); 1.1 Third Floor Attic Room 1 (3층 다락1방); 1.2 Third Floor Attic Room 2 (3층 다락2방)	Kim Dong-hyun
7	4	12 August 2018	Evil Prison (악령감옥) (Villa of Shaman 천해명)	1. Third Floor (3층); 1.3 Third Floor Living Room (3층 거실); 1.4 Attic Warehouse (다락 창고); 1.5 Water Tank (물탱크); 1.6 Music Appreciation Room (막바지 여름휴가); 2. Second Floor (2층); 2.1 Second Floor Living Room (2층 거실); 2.2 Kitchen (주방); 2.3 Urn Room (분골함방); 2.4 Doll's Room (인형의방); 2.5 Shaman's Room (무당의방); 2.6 Wardrobe (의상실)	Kim Dong-hyun
8	4	19 August 2018	Evil Prison (악령감옥) (Villa of Shaman 천해명)	2. Second Floor (2층); 2.7 Secret Room (비밀의 방); →2.7.1 Re-explore Music Appreciation Room (막바지 여름휴가) on the Third Floor; 2.8 Corridor of second floor. 2.9 Re-explore Shaman's Room (무당의방) →2.9.1 Shaman's Secret Room (무당의 비밀의 방); 2.10 Re-explore Kitchen (주방); 3. First Floor (1층); 3.1 First Floor Kitchen (1층 주방); 3.2 First Floor Living Room (1층 거실); 3.3 Cellar (지하실); 3.4 Huge door (거대한 문); Escape successfully!!!	Kim Dong-hyun
9	5	26 August 2018	Bunker (벙커)	1. Living Space (거주공간); 2. Theatre (극장); 3. Garden Field (텃밭); 4. Grocery Store (식료품 창고); 5. Treatment Room (치료실); Guest: Jang Dong-min	Kang Ho-dong
10	5	2 September 2018	Bunker (벙커)	5. Treatment Room (치료실); 6. Arcade Room (오락실); 7. Mother Room (어머니 방); 8. Security room (보안실); Escape successfully!!!; Guest: Jang Dong-min	Kang Ho-dong
11	6	9 September 2018	Taeyang Girls' High School (태양 여고)	1. Classroom 2-1 (교실 2-1); 2. Consultation Room (상담실); 3. Infirmary Room (양호실); 4. Library (도서관); 5. Secret Den (비밀 아지트)	Yoo Byung-Jae
12	6	16 September 2018	Taeyang Girls' High School (태양 여고)	6. 1st Floor Corridor (1층 복도); 6.1 Store (매점); 7. Changing Room (탈의실); 8. Sacrificial Waiting Room (희생양 대기실); 9. Preparation Room (제사 준비실); 10. Follower Dormitory (신도 생활관); 11. Secret Laboratory (비밀 연구실); 12. Temple (신전); 13. Secret Den (밀실); 14. Rooftop (옥상); Escape successfully!!!	Yoo Byung-Jae
13	Special Episode	23 September 2018	Review of Season 1		

=== Season 2 ===
List of episodes (season 2)

Episode #	Challenge #	Original airdate	Scene	Content
1	—N/a	17 March 2019	Team meal meeting	Members meet in advance and are briefed on the new challenge format
1	1	17 March 2019	Mirae University (미래대학교)	1. Gym (체육관); 2. Gym Corridor (체육관 복도); 3.1 Conference Room (회의실); 3.2 Branch Manager's room (지부장실); 3.3 Cafeteria (식당); 3.4 Hangar (Upper) (격납고 ((上))
2	1	24 March 2019	Mirae University (미래대학교)	3.4 Hangar (Upper) (격납고 ((上)); 3.5 Security Room (보안실); 3.6 Storeroom (창고); 3.7 Control Room (Upper) 통제실(上); 3.8 Language Lab (언어연구실); 3.9 Black Tower (검은탑 내실); Escape successfully!!!
3	2	31 March 2019	Buam-dong Residence (부암동 저택)	1. Hoehyun-dong parking lot (회현동); Kim Jong-min and P.O: 2. Hoehyun-dong prison cell (회현동 감금방); Kang Ho-dong, Shindong, Yoo Byeong-jae and Kim Dong-hyun: 3. Travelling by car (차량 이동); 4. Front Door (대문 앞); 5. Garden (정원); 6. 1st floor (1층)
4	2	7 April 2019	Buam-dong Residence (부암동 저택)	Kim Jong-min and P.O: 2. Hoehyun-dong prison cell (회현동 감금방); Kang Ho-dong, Shindong, Yoo Byeong-jae and Kim Dong-hyun: 6. 2nd floor (2층); 7. Basement (지하실); 8. Miri's Room (미리의 방); 9. Laboratory (연구실); 10. On the way back to Hoehyun-dong (회현동 가는 길); Escape successfully!!!
5	3	14 April 2019	Mugan Prison (무간 교도소)	1. Escort (호송); 2. Entrance (입소); 3. New Prisoner Waiting Room (신입자대기실); 4. Block 13 (수용 13동); 5. Room 4 (4번 방); 6. Room 5 (5번 방); 7. Detention Block 13 (수용 13동 검방); 8. Exercise Yard (운동장)
6	3	21 April 2019	Mugan Prison (무간 교도소)	8. Exercise Yard (운동장); 9. Reception Room (접견실); 10. Laundry Room (세탁실); 11. Warden's Office (소장실); 12. Lights Out (소등); Escape failed!!!; Special appearances: Yoo Min-sang, Moon Se-yoon
7	4	28 April 2019	Hope Research Laboratory (희망연구소)	1. Deserted Refrigerated Warehouse (폐 냉동창고); 2. Kitchen Storage (주방 창고); 3. Kitchen (주방); 4. Cafeteria (식당); 5. Officer's Barrack (장교 막사); 6. Laboratory (연구실)
8	4	5 May 2019	Hope Research Laboratory (희망연구소)	6. Laboratory (연구실); 7. Isolation Room (격리실); 8. Control Room (통제실); 9. Pantry (식료품 창고); Escape successfully!!!
9	5	12 May 2019	St. Matthew Jo's Psychiatric Hospital (조마테오 정신병원)	1. Admission (입원); 2. Room 601 (601호); 3. Room 603 (603호); 4. Room 605 (605호); 5. Doctor Rounds (회진); 6. Break Room (휴게실); 7. Taking Medication (약 복용); 8. Nurse Office (간호사실); 9. Basement (지하실); 10. 5th Floor (5층 병동)
10	5	19 May 2019	St. Matthew Jo's Psychiatric Hospital (조마테오 정신병원)	11. Room 503 (503호); 12. Director's Office (원장실); 13. Locked Room (밀실); 14. Special Treatment Unit (특수치료실); 15. Broken Elevator (고장 난 엘리베이터); 16. Elevator (엘리베이터); Escape successfully!!!
11	6	26 May 2019	Murder Prison (살인감옥)	1. Prison Cell (감금방); 2a. Corridor (복도); 3. Workroom (작업실); 4. Storage Room (창고); 5. Secret Room (밀실)
12	6	2 June 2019	Murder Prison (살인감옥)	6. 29 June Paju (6월29일 파주); 7. Room 306 (306호); 8a. Corridor (복도); 9a. Workroom (작업실); 10. Room 304 (304호); 9b. Workroom (작업실); 11. Storage Room (창고); 8b. Corridor (복도); 11. NO HIT NO RUN; 8c. Corridor (복도); 2b. Corridor (복도); 12. Room 304 (304호); 13. Room of 1984 (1984년의 방); 14. (20개의 숫자); 15. Last Door (마지막 문); Escape successfully!!!; Special appearances: Lee Jang-won (Peppertones), Kim Ji-seok, Ha Seok-jin
13	Special Episode	9 June 2019	Review of Season 2 Kim Jong-min is absent for this episode	

=== Season 3 ===
List of episodes (season 3)

Episode #	Challenge #	Original airdate	Scene	Notes
1	1	1 March 2020	Time Machine Laboratory (타임머신 연구실)	
2	1	8 March 2020	Time Machine Laboratory (타임머신 연구실)	
3	2	15 March 2020	Zombie Factory (좀비 공장)	
4	2	22 March 2020	Zombie Factory (좀비 공장)	
5	3	29 March 2020	Dark Villa (어둠의 별장) (Villa of Shaman 천마도령)	Related to St. Matthew Jo's Psychiatric Hospital patient named Jang Gi Du
6	3	5 April 2020	Dark Villa (어둠의 별장) (Villa of Shaman 천마도령)	Related to St. Matthew Jo's Psychiatric Hospital patient named Jang Gi Du
—	No new episodes from 12 to 26 April as filming of the show has been postponed due to COVID-19. A special compilation episode of Top 50 scenes from the previous 15 escape challenges in all 3 seasons was aired on 12 April.			
7	4	3 May 2020	Achaland (아차랜드)	
8	4	10 May 2020	Achaland (아차랜드)	
9	5	17 May 2020	Bread Factory (빵공장)	
10	5	24 May 2020	Bread Factory (빵공장)	
11	6	31 May 2020	Mysterious Bunker/Back To The Gyeongseong (의문의 벙커/백 투 더 경성)	Special appearance by Ha Seok-jin
12	6	7 June 2020	Mysterious Bunker/Back To The Gyeongseong (의문의 벙커/백 투 더 경성)	Special appearance by Ha Seok-jin
13	Special Episode	14 June 2020	Review of Season 3	Kim Dong-hyun is absent for this episode

=== Season 4 ===
List of episodes (season 4)

Episode #	Challenge #	Original airdate	Scene	Notes
1	1	11 July 2021	Back To The Ahan (백 투 더 아한)	Continued from Season 3's Mysterious Bunker/Back To The Gyeongseong challenge
2	1	18 July 2021	Back To The Ahan (백 투 더 아한)	Continued from Season 3's Mysterious Bunker/Back To The Gyeongseong challenge
3	2	25 July 2021	Luckyland (럭키랜드)	
4	2	1 August 2021	Luckyland (럭키랜드)	
5	3	8 August 2021	Jeoksong Prison (적송교도소)	
6	3	15 August 2021	Jeoksong Prison (적송교도소)	
7	4	22 August 2021	Crazy House (크레이지 하우스)	
8	4	29 August 2021	Crazy House (크레이지 하우스)	
9	5	5 September 2021	3rd Industrial Complex (제3공업단지)	
10	5	12 September 2021	3rd Industrial Complex (제3공업단지)	
11	6	19 September 2021	Haneul Shelter (하늘에 쉼터)	
12	6	26 September 2021	Haneul Shelter (하늘에 쉼터)	
13	Special episode	3 October 2021	Review of season 4	

== Great Escape Universe ==
World Season	Zombie	Ghost	Secret Security Association (SSA)	Time Machine
1	Abandoned Hospital	Evil Prison (Villa of Shaman); Taeyang Girls' High School	—	—
2	Hope Research Laboratory	St. Matthew Jo's Psychiatric Hospital	Mirae University	—
3	Zombie Factory	Dark Villa (Villa of Shaman)	Bread Factory	Time Machine Laboratory; Mysterious Bunker/Back To The Gyeongseong
4	Jeoksong Prison	—	3rd Industrial Complex; Haneul Shelter	Back To The Ahan

== Ratings ==
- In the ratings below, the highest rating for the show will be in red and the lowest rating for the show will be in blue.
- Note that the show airs on a cable channel (pay TV), which plays part in its slower uptake and relatively small audience share when compared to programs broadcast (FTA) on public networks such as KBS, SBS, MBC or EBS.

Great Escape (Season 1 to 4) : South Korea viewers per episode (thousands)

Season	Episode number													Average
Season	1	2	3	4	5	6	7	8	9	10	11	12	13	Average
1	334	449	487	502	497	558	601	563	718	704	680	629	N/A	560.2
2	784	625	590	467	601	498	446	664	523	606	545	864	469	590.9
3	993	837	1017	830	1019	1123	930	799	873	944	964	804	591	901.8
4	898	644	656	648	696	771	825	680	791	773	907	652	488	725.3

Source: Audience measurement performed nationwide by Nielsen Media Research.

Season 1
2018		AGB Nielsen (Nationwide)
Ep.	Broadcast date	AGB Nielsen (Nationwide)
1	1 July	1.397%
2	8 July	1.626%
3	15 July	1.765%
4	22 July	1.557%
5	29 July	1.699%
6	5 August	1.776%
7	12 August	1.863%
8	19 August	1.641%
9	26 August	2.225%
10	2 September	2.135%
11	9 September	2.230%
12	16 September	2.036%
Special
13	23 September	1.107%

Season 2
2019		AGB Nielsen (Nationwide)
Ep.	Broadcast date	AGB Nielsen (Nationwide)
1	17 March	2.546%
2	24 March	2.048%
3	31 March	1.958%
4	7 April	1.749%
5	14 April	2.001%
6	21 April	1.836%
7	28 April	1.537%
8	5 May	2.001%
9	12 May	1.709%
10	19 May	1.871%
11	26 May	1.765%
12	2 June	2.955%
Special
13	9 June	1.714%

Season 3
2020		AGB Nielsen (Nationwide)
Ep.	Broadcast date	AGB Nielsen (Nationwide)
1	1 March	2.740%
2	8 March	2.333%
3	15 March	2.767%
4	22 March	2.272%
5	29 March	2.871%
6	5 April	2.958%
7	3 May	2.705%
8	10 May	2.566%
9	17 May	2.633%
10	24 May	2.717%
11	31 May	2.570%
12	7 June	2.528%
Special
13	14 June	1.7%

Season 4
2021		AGB Nielsen (Nationwide)
Ep.	Broadcast date	AGB Nielsen (Nationwide)
1	11 July	2.828%
2	18 July	1.949%
3	25 July	2.003%
4	1 August	1.954%
5	8 August	2.001%
6	15 August	2.289%
7	22 August	2.087%
8	29 August	2.110%
9	5 September	2.412%
10	12 September	2.272%
11	19 September	2.581%
12	26 September	1.976%
Special
13	3 October	1.595%

== Awards and nominations ==
Year	Award	Category	Recipients	Result	Ref.
2020	56th Baeksang Arts Awards	Technical Award	Jang Yeon-wook (Art)	Won	

== International version ==
=== Chinese franchise ===
In 2019, Mango Television purchased the rights for a Chinese adaptation of the show, titled Great Escape (密室大逃脫), which premiered on 30 March 2019.

=== Russian franchise ===
In 2023, channel STS released an official Russian adaptation of the format, titled Большой побег, which premiered on 7 March 2023.

=== Vietnamese franchise ===
In 2022, a program called Thử thách trốn thoát, was aired on channel VTV3 at 9.15 pm every Sunday night.
