= 1 Percent of Friendship =

- Also known as: 1 Percent Friendship
- Starring: Bae Cheol-soo; Ahn Jung-hwan; Kim Hee-chul; Bae Jeong-nam
- Country of origin: South Korea
- Original language: Korean
- No. of episodes: 14

Production
- Running time: 90 minutes

Original release
- Network: KBS2
- Release: March 3 – June 9, 2018

1 Percent of Friendship (Korean: 1%의 우정; lit. 1% Friendship) is a South Korean reality show distributed by KBS2 which aired on Saturdays. Originally having been just a Chuseok show, it became a permanent weekly show after favourable reviews of its pilot episode.

== Broadcast timeline ==
| Period | Time (KST) | Type |
|---|---|---|
| October 5, 2017 | Thursday 5:50 – 6:55 PM (Part 1); Thursday 6:55 – 8:00 PM (Part 2) | Pilot |
| March 3, 2018 – June 9, 2018 | Saturday 10:45 PM – 12:15 AM | Regular |

== Format ==
The reality show explores relationship dynamics and developments by looking at how two people with opposite personalities interact and build friendship.

== Host ==
- Bae Cheol-soo
- Ahn Jung-hwan
- Kim Hee-chul
- Bae Jeong-nam (Episode 10-14)
- Jung Hyung-don (Episode Pilot)

== List of episodes ==
| Episode # | Air Date | Guest(s) |
|---|---|---|
| Pilot | October 5, 2017 | Kim Jong-min, Seol Min-seok, Ahn Jung-hwan, Bae Jeong-nam |
| 1 | March 3, 2018 | Bae Jeong-nam, Joo Jin-woo |
| 2 | March 10, 2018 | Bae Jeong-nam, Joo Jin-woo |
| 3 | March 17, 2018 | Bae Jeong-nam, Joo Jin-woo, Kim Min-jun, Kim Hoyoung |
| 4 | March 31, 2018 | Bae Jeong-nam, Kim Min-jun, Kim Hoyoung |
| 5 | April 7, 2018 | Choiza, Sung Hyuk, Kim Ji-min, Kwak Jeong-eun |
| 6 | April 14, 2018 | Choiza, Sung Hyuk, Kim Ji-min, Kwak Jeong-eun |
| 7 | April 21, 2018 | Kim Ji-min, Kwak Jeong-eun, Tak Jae-hoon, Jang Seung-jo |
| 8 | April 28, 2018 | Tak Jae-hoon, Jang Seung-jo, Choiza, Sung Hyuk, Jung Changuk, Nucksal, Microdot, TopBob |
| 9 | May 5, 2018 | Tak Jae-hoon, Jang Seung-jo, Choiza, Sung Hyuk |
| 10 | May 12, 2018 | Choi Yong-soo, Han Hyun-min |
| 11 | May 19, 2018 | Choi Yong-soo, Han Hyun-min |
| 12 | May 26, 2018 | Choi Yong-soo, Han Hyun-min |
| 13 | June 2, 2018 | Kim Hoyoung, Boom, Hong Seok-cheon |
| 14 | June 9, 2018 | Joo Jin-woo, Han Hyun-min |

== Rating ==
In the ratings below, the highest rating for the show will be in red, and the lowest rating for the show will be in blue each year.

| Ep. # | Broadcast date | Average audience share | |
| Ep. # | Broadcast date | AGB Nielsen | TNmS Ratings |
|---|---|---|---|
| Pilot 1 | October 5, 2017 | 4.7% | N/A |
| Pilot 2 | October 5, 2017 | 6.9% | N/A |
| 1 | March 3, 2018 | 3.1% | 3.2% |
| 2 | March 10, 2018 | 3.5% | 2.8% |
| 3 | March 17, 2018 | 2.4% | 2.5% |
| 4 | March 31, 2018 | 2.9% | 2.7% |
| 5 | April 7, 2018 | 2.0% | 2.6% |
| 6 | April 14, 2018 | 2.8% | 2.7% |
| 7 | April 21, 2018 | 2.4% | 2.6% |
| 8 | April 28, 2018 | 2.2% | 2.1% |
| 9 | May 5, 2018 | 2.1% | 2.4% |
| 10 | May 12, 2018 | 4.3% | 4.4% |
| 11 | May 19, 2018 | 3.3% | 3.6% |
| 12 | May 26, 2018 | 2.9% | 3.8% |
| 13 | June 2, 2018 | 3.3% | 3.5% |
| 14 | June 9, 2018 | 3.6% | 3.9% |

== Awards and nominations ==
| Year | Award | Category | Recipient | Result | Ref. |
|---|---|---|---|---|---|
| 2018 | 2018 KBS Entertainment Awards | Hot Issue Entertainer | Bae Jeong-nam | Won | |
| 2018 | 2018 KBS Entertainment Awards | Rookie Award in Variety Category | Bae Jeong-nam | Nominated | |
