= Friends (2021 TV series) =

- Starring: Lee Sang-min; Kim Hee-chul; Shindong; Seunghee
- Country of origin: South Korea
- Original language: Korean
- No. of episodes: 12

Production
- Running time: 110 minutes

Original release
- Network: Channel A
- Release: February 17 – May 12, 2021

Related
- Heart Signal

Friends (Korean: 프렌즈) is a show by the Heart Signal production team and features cast members from Heart Signal 2 and Heart Signal 3. It follows the daily lives of its cast while highlighting their budding friendships and romance.

== Broadcast schedule ==
Broadcast channel	Broadcast period	Airtime
Channel A	February 17, 2021 – May 12, 2021	Every Wednesday 22:30 – 00:20

== MC ==
- Lee Sang-min – Main MC
- Kim Hee-chul (Super Junior)
- Shindong (Super Junior)
- Seunghee (Oh My Girl)

== Cast ==
Name	Birth year	Occupation
Kim Do-gyun (김도균)	1988	Korean medicine doctor
Jung Jae-ho (정재호)	1990	CEO of a startup company
Kim Hyun-woo (김현우)	1985	chef and restaurant owner
Jung Eui-dong (정의동)	1992	animal replica sculptor
Oh Young-joo (오영주)	1991	YouTuber
Kim Jang-mi (김장미)	1989	fashion boutique owner
Lee Ga-heun (이가흔)	1996	veterinary student
Park Ji-hyun (박지현)	1996	student at Waseda University
Seo Min-jae (서민재)	1993	auto mechanic

== List of episodes ==
- In the ratings below, the highest rating for the show is in red and the lowest rating for the show is in blue.

Episodes	Broadcast Date	Rating
1	February 17, 2021	0.787%
2	February 24, 2021	0.911%
3	March 3, 2021	0.963%
4	March 10, 2021	0.865%
5	March 17, 2021	0.625%
6	March 24, 2021	1.047%
7	March 31, 2021	0.754%
8	April 14, 2021	0.547%
9	April 21, 2021	0.375%
10	April 28, 2021	0.736%
11	May 5, 2021	0.813%
12	May 12, 2021	0.857%

== See also ==
- Heart Signal
