= Where on Earth?? =

South Korean television show

- Promotional poster
- Hangul: 거기가 어딘데??
- Lit.: Where Is There??
- RR: Geogiga eodinde??
- MR: Kŏgiga ŏdinde??
- Genre: Reality show Travel documentary
- Starring: Jo Se-ho; Cha Tae-hyun; Bae Jeong-nam; Ji Jin-hee
- Country of origin: South Korea
- Original language: Korean
- No. of seasons: 1
- No. of episodes: 11 + 1 Special

Production
- Executive producer: Yu Ho-jin
- Production locations: Oman; Scotland; South Korea
- Running time: 80 minutes
- Production company: Monster Union

Original release
- Network: KBS2
- Release: June 1 – August 31, 2018

Where on Earth?? (Korean: 거기가 어딘데??; RR: Geogiga eodinde??) is a South Korea variety show program on KBS2 starring Jo Se-ho, Cha Tae-hyun, Bae Jeong-nam and Ji Jin-hee. The show aired on KBS2 starting June 1, 2018 and ended on August 31, 2018. The program also aired on KBS World with English subtitles.

== Synopsis ==
Ji Jin-hee, Cha Tae-hyun, Jo Se-ho and Bae Jeong-nam go on an expedition to explore and experience the sublimity of the unpredictable Mother Nature!

== Guests ==
- Nam Young-ho (1st Expedition)
- James Hooper (2nd Expedition)

== Expedition locations ==
Episode	Expedition	Broadcast Date	Title	Location
1	1	June 1, 2018	The Arabian Desert	Raqi, Ash Sharqīyah, Oman
2	1	June 8, 2018	The Arabian Desert	Raqi, Ash Sharqīyah, Oman
3	1	June 22, 2018 (Note: Episode was pushed back a week due to the 2018 FIFA World Cup.)	The Arabian Desert	Raqi, Ash Sharqīyah, Oman
4	1	June 29, 2018	The Arabian Desert	Raqi, Ash Sharqīyah, Oman
5	1	July 13, 2018 (Note: Episode was pushed back a week due to Uruguay vs. France soccer match for the 2018 FIFA World Cup.)	The Arabian Desert	Raqi, Ash Sharqīyah, Oman
6	1	July 20, 2018	The Arabian Desert	Raqi, Ash Sharqīyah, Oman
7	1	July 27, 2018	The Arabian Desert	Raqi, Ash Sharqīyah, Oman
7	2	July 27, 2018	Isle of Skye Trekking	Skye, Highland, Scotland
8	2	August 3, 2018	Isle of Skye Trekking	Skye, Highland, Scotland
9	2	August 10, 2018	Isle of Skye Trekking	Skye, Highland, Scotland
10	2	August 17, 2018	Isle of Skye Trekking	Skye, Highland, Scotland
11	2	August 24, 2018	Isle of Skye Trekking	Skye, Highland, Scotland
12	—N/a	August 31, 2018	Special Episode	None

== Original soundtrack ==
No.	Title	Artist	Length
1.	"Fly"	Ciel	3.48
2.	"Wind"	Lee Soo-hoon	4.47
3.	"To The Sun" (햇빛 속으로 난 가리)	Geon Woo (건우)	3.46
4.	"Wind"	Lody, Yoon-seul	3.44
5.	"Fly Away" (Inst.)	Ciel	3.48
6.	"Wind" (Inst.)	Lee Soo-hoon	4.47
7.	"To The Sun" (Inst.)	Geon Woo (건우)	3.46
8.	"Wind" (Inst.)	Lody, Yoon-seul	3.44
Total length:			32.10

== Ratings ==
List of ratings (episode 1–11 + 1 special)
- Ratings listed below are the individual corner ratings of Where On Earth. (Note: Individual corner ratings do not include commercial time, which regular ratings include.)
- In the ratings below, the highest rating for the show will be in red and the lowest rating for the show will be in blue each year.

Ep. #	Original Airdate	AGB Nielsen Ratings (Nationwide)
1	June 1, 2018	3.3%
2	June 8, 2018	3.5%
3	June 22, 2018	4.5%
4	June 29, 2018	3.8%
5	July 13, 2018	3.4%
6	July 20, 2018	3.2%
7	July 27, 2018	3.3%
8	August 3, 2018	2.8%
9	August 10, 2018	3.0%
10	August 17, 2018	3.1%
11	August 24, 2018	2.5%
Special
12	August 31, 2018	2.6%

== Awards and nominations ==
Year	Award	Category	Recipients	Result	Ref.
2018	16th KBS Entertainment Awards	2018 Hot Issue Entertainer Award	Bae Jeong-nam	Won	
2018	16th KBS Entertainment Awards	Rookie Award in Variety Category	Bae Jeong-nam	Nominated	
