= Chrissy & Dave Dine Out =

2024 American television series

- Genre: Reality
- Directed by: Anna Chai
- Starring: Chrissy Teigen; David Chang; Joel Kim Booster
- Country of origin: United States
- Original language: English
- No. of series: 1
- No. of episodes: 5

Production
- Executive producers: Dan Cutforth; Jane Lipsitz; Nan Strait; Dan Volpe; Michael Rucker; San Heng; Chad Mumm; Mark W. Olsen; David Chang; Dave O'Connor; Chris Ying; Christopher Chen; Chrissy Teigen; Tracy Stevens; Luke Dillon
- Running time: 42 minutes
- Production companies: Alfred Street Industries; Vox Media Studios; Majordomo Media; Huntley Productions; 3 Arts Entertainment

Original release
- Network: Freeform
- Release: January 24 – February 21, 2024

Chrissy & Dave Dine Out is an American reality television series which premiered on January 24, 2024, on Freeform. Chrissy & Dave Dine Out Season 2 does not have an official release date.

== Production ==
Chrissy & Dave (Christine Diane Teigen and David Chang) are both famous restaurateurs who explores the true meaning of cooking by hosting popular and exciting dinner parties around the city of Los Angeles. It involves forming great conversations, amazing food, and features celebrity guests. According to Hulu, on May 1, 2019, the series undercover the working title Family Style, as part of a new slate of non-scripted programming. On September 27, 2023, the series was retitled Chrissy & Dave Dine Out, and later released on network platform Freeform. However, on November 6, 2023, it was announced that the series would premiere on January 24, 2024.

== Episodes ==
No.	Title	Original release date	U.S. viewers (millions)
1	"Bring the Pizza!"	January 24, 2024	N/A
Restaurant: Pizzeria Bianco; Owner: Chris Bianco; Guests: Jimmy Kimmel, Molly McNearney; Courses: Antipasto, Tomato & Burrata, The Marinara, The Wise Guy, The Rosa
2	"La Casita Mexicana"	January 31, 2024	N/A
Restaurant: La Casita Mexicana; Owners: Jaime Martin del Campo & Ramiro Arvizu; Guests: John Legend, Grace Seo Chang, Kumail Nanjiani, Emily V. Gordon; Courses: Ceviche Verde/Queso Azteca, Tres Moles, Chile en Nogada, Los Chamorros, Flan/Plantains/Churros; Absent: Joel Kim Booster
3	"Those Wings Tho!"	February 7, 2024	N/A
Restaurant: Yangban Society; Owners: Katianna Hong & John Hong; Guests: Reid Scott, Eric Nam; Courses: Squash & Caviar, Acorn Noodles, Avocado Pear Salad, Geotjeori, Twice Fried Wings, Matzoh Ball Soup, Truffled Rice Cakes, Abalone Pot Pie, Coconut Cheesecake, Buffalo Milk Soft Serve
4	"The Tasting Menu"	February 14, 2024	N/A
Restaurant: Providence; Owner: Michael Cimarusti; Guests: Simu Liu & Regina Hall; Courses: Uni Tart/Amberjack Tartare/Smoked Salmon/Wagyu Tartare, Macadamia Nuts & Caviar, Tai Snapper, Spot Prawns, Norwegian King Crab, Vermilion Rockfish, Liberty Farms Duck, Dessert
5	"Double the Fun"	February 21, 2024	N/A
Restaurants: Meals By Genet, Majordomo; Owners: Genet Agonafer (Meals By Genet), David Chang (Majordomo); Guests: Matt Rogers, Sasheer Zamata, Christine Ko (Meals By Genet); Randall Park, Alexandra Daddario (Majordomo); Courses: Vegetarian Combination, Doro Wat, Lamb & Beef Tibs, Kitfo (Meals By Genet); Tuna Tartare, Oysters, Kanpachi, Bing Board, Market & Snacks, Boiled Whole Chicken, Two Ways, Whole Plate Short Rib, Pavlova (Majordomo)
