= Heart Signal =

South Korean dating-reality show

- S5 panelists promotional poster
- Genre: Entertainment; Reality
- Directed by: Lee Jin-min, Park Kyong-sik, Seung-Young-yoon, Yun Hoon-ki, Choi Yoon-ah, Kim Hye-in, Shin Yoo-jin, Nam Eun-young, Jung Sung-hee, Kim Na-ra, Choi Eun-ji, Park Chul-hwan, Kim Hong-goo
- Presented by: Yoon Jong-shin; Lee Sang-min; Kim Eana; and others
- Country of origin: South Korea
- Original language: Korean
- No. of seasons: 5
- No. of episodes: 55 + 6 specials

Production
- Running time: 70-130 minutes
- Production company: Channel A

Original release
- Network: Channel A
- Release: June 2, 2017 – present

Related
- Friends; Heart Pairing

Heart Signal (Korean: 하트시그널) is a South Korean dating reality television show distributed by Channel A. Season 1 of the show aired in 2017, followed by season 2 in 2018, season 3 in 2020, season 4 in 2023 and season 5 in 2026. Based on the cast members of Heart Signal, a new program named Friends was also produced.

== Overview ==
The reality show follows eight people living together for one month as they get to know each other and go on dates. Every night, each cast member sends an anonymous text message to another cast member to show their romantic interest. However, they are not allowed to directly confess their love. Meanwhile, a panel of celebrities and experts watches the show, analyzing the cast members' actions and trying to predict who will text who.

== Panelists ==
Season 1

- Yoon Jong-shin
- Lee Sang-min
- Kim Eana
- Yang Jae-woong
- Shim So-young
- Shindong (Super Junior)

Season 2

- Yoon Jong-shin
- Lee Sang-min
- Kim Eana
- Yang Jae-woong
- ONE
- Soyou

Season 3

- Lee Sang-min
- Kim Eana
- Yang Jae-woong
- Han Hye-jin
- Yoon Shi-yoon
- P.O (Block B)

Season 4

- Yoon Jong-shin
- Lee Sang-min
- Kim Eana
- Kim Choong-gi
- Kang Seung-yoon (Winner) -> Kim Jin-woo (Winner)
- Mimi (Oh My Girl)

Season 5

- Yoon Jong-shin
- Lee Sang-min
- Kim Eana
- Roy Kim
- Tsuki (Billlie)

== Cast members ==
=== Season 1 ===
Name	Birth year	Occupation	Notes
Jang Cheon (장천)	1985	lawyer (Graduated from Department of Communication at Kyunghee University and Law at Konkuk University)	
Kang Sung-wook (강성욱)	1985	musical actor (Graduated from Seoul Institute of Arts)	
Seo Joo-won (서주원)	1994	race car driver (Graduated from Department of European Culture at Chung-ang University)	
Yoon Hyeon-chan (윤현찬)	1985	chef and restaurant owner	Joined the show in episode 8
Bae Yoon-kyung (배윤경)	1993	actress (Graduated from Department of Fashion Design at Konkuk University)	
Kim Se-rin (김세린)	1993	marketer at Cirque du Soleil (Studied at New York University)	
Seo Ji-hye (서지혜)	1996	student at Ewha Womans University	
Shin A-ra (신아라)	1995	first runner-up at Miss Korea 2016 (Graduated from Department of Aviation at Gwangju Women's University)	Joined the show in episode 4

Total Heart Signals

Participants	Total of Signals Received
Jang Cheon	27
Kang Sung-wook	9
Seo Joo-won	12
Yoon Hyeon-chan	0
Bae Yoon-kyung	21
Kim Se-rin	2
Seo Ji-hye	8
Shin A-ra	13

Final Results

Confession Result
Participants
Kang Sung-wook	↔	Shin A-ra
Jang Cheon	↔	Bae Yoon-kyung
Seo Joo-won	→	Seo Ji-hye
Yoon Hyeon-chan	→	Shin A-ra
Kim Se-rin	→	Jang Cheon
Seo Ji-hye	→	Jang Cheon

=== Season 2 ===
Name	Birth year	Occupation	Notes
Kim Do-gyun (김도균)	1988	Korean medicine doctor (Graduated from Department of Medicine at Kyunghee University)	
Jung Jae-ho (정재호)	1990	CEO of a startup company (Graduated from Department of Industrial Engineering and Management Science at UC Berkeley)	
Lee Gyu-bin (이규빈)	1993	preparing to join the South Korean public service (Graduated from Department of Free Major at Seoul National University)	
Kim Hyun-woo (김현우)	1985	chef and restaurant owner	Joined the show in episode 2
Oh Young-joo (오영주)	1991	marketer at Microsoft (Graduated from University of California)	
Song Da-eun (송다은)	1991	aspiring actress (Graduated from Department of Broadcasting and Entertainment at Induk University)	
Im Hyun-joo (임현주)	1992	work as an actress	student at Kookmin University
Kim Jang-mi (김장미)	1989	fashion boutique owner (Graduated from New York Fashion Institute of Technology)	Joined the show in episode 6

Total Heart Signals

Participants	Total of Signals Received
Kim Do-gyun	17
Jung Jae-ho	17
Lee Gyu-bin	5
Kim Hyun-woo	22
Oh Young-joo	26
Song Da-eun	18
Im Hyun-joo	25
Kim Jang-mi	3

Final Results

Confession Result
Participants
Jung Jae-ho	↔	Song Da-eun
Kim Hyun-woo	↔	Im Hyun-joo
Kim Do-gyun	→	Im Hyun-joo
Lee Gyu-bin	→	Oh Young-joo
Oh Young-joo	→	Kim Hyun-woo
Kim Jang-mi	→	Kim Do-gyun

=== Season 3 ===
Name	Birth year	Occupation	Notes
Cheon In-woo (천인우)	1989	engineering manager at a fintech company (Graduated from Department of Computer Science at UC Berkeley and MBA at Stanford University)	
Jung Eui-dong (정의동)	1992	animal replica sculptor	
Im Han-gyeol (임한결)	1989	branding consultant for restaurants	
Kim Kang-yeol (김강열)	1994	online fashion boutique owner (Graduated from Department of Fashion Design at Gachon University)	Joined the show in episode 6
Lee Ga-heun (이가흔)	1996	veterinary student at Konkuk University	
Park Ji-hyun (박지현)	1996	student at Waseda University	
Seo Min-jae (서민재)	1993	auto mechanic	studied Mechanical Engineering Inha University and Hanyang University
Cheon An-na (천안나)	1994	secretary (Graduated from Department of Aviation from Hanseo University)	Joined the show in episode 8

Total Heart Signals

Participants	Total of Signals Received
Cheon In-woo	14
Jung Eui-dong	7
Im Han-gyeol	17
Kim Kang-yeol	11
Lee Ga-heun	5
Park Ji-hyun	28
Seo Min-jae	11
Cheon An-na	7

Final Results

Confession Result
Participants
Im Han-gyeol	↔	Seo Min-jae
Kim Kang-yeol	↔	Park Ji-hyun
Cheon In-woo	→	Park Ji-hyun
Jung Eui-dong	→	Cheon An-na
Lee Ga-heun	→	Jung Eui-dong
Cheon An-na	→	Kim Kang-yeol

=== Season 4 ===
Name	Birth year	Occupation	Notes
Shin Min-gyu (신민규)	1993	Strategy Consultant (Graduated from Department of French Language and Literature at Korea University)	
Han Gyeo-re (한겨레)	1989	CEO of F&B Company (Studied from Department of Theater and Film)	Winner of barista competition in South Korea and represented the country in international competitions
Yoo Ji-won (유지원)	1996	Medical intern (Graduated from Department of Materials Engineering at Seoul National University and attending College of Medicine at Kyunghee University)	
Lee Hu-shin (이후신)	1993	Painter and model (Graduated from Kaywon University of Arts)	Joined in Episode 3
Lee Ju-mi (이주미)	1994	Lawyer (Graduated from College of Law from Sookmyung Women's University and Ajou University)	
Kim Ji-young (김지영)	1995	Brand officer at interior architecture company (Graduated from Department of Aviation at Inha Technical College)	Former Korean Air flight attendant
Kim Ji-min (김지민)	2000	Student at Sungshin Women's University	
Yoo Yi-soo (유이수)	1998	Casting agent and model (Graduated from Department of Advertising at University of Illinois)	Joined in Episode 6

Heart Signals

Male participants
Female participants
Heart Signal was not revealed
Chose each other

Heart Signals
Participants	Episodes														
Participants	1	2	3	4	5	6	7	8	9	10	11	12	13	14	Final
Shin Min-gyu	Kim Ji-min	Kim Ji-min	Kim Ji-min	Kim Ji-young	Kim Ji-min	Kim Ji-min	Yoo Yi-soo	Lee Ju-mi	Yoo Yi-soo	Yoo Yi-soo	No votings held	Yoo Yi-soo	Yoo Yi-soo	No votings held	Yoo Yi-soo
Lee Ju-mi	Shin Min-gyu	Han Gyeo-re	Shin Min-gyu	Han Gyeo-re	Shin Min-gyu	Han Gyeo-re	Han Gyeo-re	Han Gyeo-re	Han Gyeo-re	Han Gyeo-re	No votings held	Han Gyeo-re	Han Gyeo-re	No votings held	Han Gyeo-re
Yoo Ji-won	Kim Ji-young	Lee Ju-mi	Lee Ju-mi	Lee Ju-mi	Kim Ji-young	Kim Ji-young	Kim Ji-young	Kim Ji-young	Kim Ji-young	Kim Ji-young	No votings held	Kim Ji-young	Kim Ji-young	No votings held	Kim Ji-young
Kim Ji-young	Han Gyeo-re	Han Gyeo-re	Shin Min-gyu	Shin Min-gyu	Shin Min-gyu	Han Gyeo-re	Shin Min-gyu	Shin Min-gyu	Shin Min-gyu	Shin Min-gyu	No votings held	Lee Hu-shin	Shin Min-gyu	No votings held	Han Gyeo-re
Han Gyeo-re	Kim Ji-young	Kim Ji-young	Kim Ji-young	Lee Ju-mi	Lee Ju-mi	Kim Ji-young	Kim Ji-young	Kim Ji-young	Kim Ji-young	Kim Ji-young	No votings held	Lee Ju-mi	Kim Ji-young	No votings held	Kim Ji-young
Kim Ji-min	Yoo Ji-won	Yoo Ji-won	Yoo Ji-won	Lee Hu-shin	Yoo Ji-won	Lee Hu-shin	Lee Hu-shin	Lee Hu-shin	Lee Hu-shin	Lee Hu-shin	No votings held	Lee Hu-shin	Lee Hu-shin	No votings held	Lee Hu-shin
Lee Hu-shin	Not yet in the house		Lee Ju-mi	Kim Ji-min	Kim Ji-young	Kim Ji-min	Kim Ji-min	Kim Ji-min	Kim Ji-young	Kim Ji-young	No votings held	Kim Ji-young	Kim Ji-min	No votings held	Kim Ji-young
Yoo Yi-soo	Not yet in the house					Lee Hu-shin	Shin Min-gyu	Shin Min-gyu	Shin Min-gyu	Shin Min-gyu	No votings held	Shin Min-gyu	Shin Min-gyu	No votings held	Shin Min-gyu

Total Heart Signals

Participants	Total of Signals Received
Shin Min-gyu	18
Han Gyeo-re	14
Yoo Ji-won	4
Lee Hu-shin	11
Lee Ju-mi	8
Kim Ji-young	26
Kim Ji-min	9
Yoo Yi-soo	6

Final Results

Confession Result
Participants
Han Gyeo-re	↔	Kim Ji-young
Shin Min-gyu	↔	Yoo Yi-soo
Yoo Ji-won	→	Kim Ji-young
Lee Hu-shin	→	Kim Ji-young
Lee Ju-mi	→	Han Gyeo-re
Kim Ji-min	→	Lee Hu-shin

=== Season 5 ===
Male participants
Female participants

Name	Birth year	Occupation	Notes
Park Woo-yeol(박우열)	2002	Marketer at a company	
Kim Min-ju (김민주)	2000	Digital marketer and aspiring announcer	
Jeong Gyu-ri (정규리)	1998	Modern hanbok brand director (graduated from Department of Fashion Industry in Incheon National University)	
Kim Seong-min (김성민)	1998	Dermatologist (graduated from Department of Medicine in Chungbuk National University)	
Kim Seo-won (김서원)	2002	Fashion model (graduated from Seoul Comprehensive Arts School)	
Kang Yoo-kyung (강유경)	2004	Korean dance major at Sungkyunkwan University	
Jung Jun-hyun (정준현)	1994	Lawyer (graduated from Department of Italian Studies and Law in Hankuk University of Foreign Studies)	Joined in Episode 2
Choi So-yoon (최소윤)	2001	Industrial and Information Design major at Korea University & Freelance graphic designer	Joined in Episode 5

Heart Signals

Chose each other
Heart Signal was not revealed

Heart Signals
Participants	Episodes															
Participants	1	2	3	4	5		6	7	8	9	10	11	12	13	14	Final
Park Woo-yeol	Kang Yoo-kyung	Jeong Gyu-ri	Jeong Gyu-ri	Kang Yoo-kyung	Kang Yoo-kyung	Choi So-yoon	Jeong Gyu-ri	Choi So-yoon	Kang Yoo-kyung	Kang Yoo-kyung	Jeong Gyu-ri	Jeong Gyu-ri		Kang Yoo-kyung	No votings held	Kang Yoo-kyung
Kim Min-ju	Kim Seong-min	Kim Seong-min	Park Woo-yeol	Kim Seong-min	Kim Seo-won	Kim Seong-min	Kim Seong-min	Kim Seong-min	Kim Seong-min	Kim Seong-min	Kim Seong-min	Jung Jun-hyun		Jung Jun-hyun	No votings held	Kim Seong-min
Jeong Gyu-ri	Park Woo-yeol	Park Woo-yeol	Park Woo-yeol	Park Woo-yeol	Kim Seo-won	Kim Seo-won	Park Woo-yeol	Kim Seo-won	Kim Seo-won	Kim Seo-won	Kim Seo-won	Kim Seo-won		Park Woo-yeol	No votings held	Kim Seo-won
Kim Seong-min	Kang Yoo-kyung	Kang Yoo-kyung	Kang Yoo-kyung	Kim Min-ju	Kang Yoo-kyung	Kang Yoo-kyung	Kang Yoo-kyung	Kim Min-ju	Kim Min-ju	Kim Min-ju	Kang Yoo-kyung	Kang Yoo-kyung		Kang Yoo-kyung	No votings held	Kang Yoo-kyung
Kim Seo-won	Kang Yoo-kyung	Kim Min-ju	Kim Min-ju	Jeong Gyu-ri	Jeong Gyu-ri	Jeong Gyu-ri	Jeong Gyu-ri	Jeong Gyu-ri	Jeong Gyu-ri	Jeong Gyu-ri	Choi So-yoon	Jeong Gyu-ri		Jeong Gyu-ri	No votings held	Jeong Gyu-ri
Kang Yoo-kyung	Park Woo-yeol	Park Woo-yeol	Kim Seong-min	Park Woo-yeol	Kim Seong-min	Kim Seong-min	Park Woo-yeol	Jung Jun-hyun	Park Woo-yeol	Park Woo-yeol	Kim Seong-min	Park Woo-yeol		Jung Jun-hyun	No votings held	Park Woo-yeol
Jung Jun-hyun	Not yet in the house	Jeong Gyu-ri	Kang Yoo-kyung	Kim Min-ju	Jeong Gyu-ri	Jeong Gyu-ri	Kang Yoo-kyung	Kang Yoo-kyung	Kim Min-ju	Kang Yoo-kyung	Kang Yoo-kyung	Kang Yoo-kyung		Kang Yoo-kyung	No votings held	Kang Yoo-kyung
Choi So-yoon	Not yet in the house					Park Woo-yeol	Jung Jun-hyun	Park Woo-yeol	Kim Seong-min	Jung Jun-hyun	Kim Seo-won	Kim Seo-won		Kim Seo-won	No votings held	Kim Seo-won

Total Heart Signals

Participants	Total of Signals Received
Park Woo-yeol	17
Kim Min-ju	8
Jeong Gyu-ri	17
Kim Seong-min	15
Kim Seo-won	13
Kang Yoo-kyung	26
Jung Jun-hyun	6
Choi So-yoon	3

Final Results

Confession Result
Participants
Park Woo-yeol	↔	Kang Yoo-kyung
Kim Seo-won	↔	Jeong Gyu-ri
Kim Seong-min	→	Kang Yoo-kyung
Jung Jun-hyun	→	Kang Yoo-kyung
Choi So-yoon	→	Kim Seo-won
Kim Min-ju	→	Kim Seong-min

== Spin-off ==
=== Heart Pairing (2025–2026) ===
The spin-off follows ten individuals who are looking to marry as they live together for a month in the "Pairing House" located in Tuscany, Italy, and Seoul. Initially, the cast members are paired blindly based on shared values and interests, such as their favorite books, before seeing each other's faces. The show tracks the participants as they evaluate practical lifestyle habits to find a life partner. Meanwhile, a panel of celebrities and experts watches the interactions to analyze the contestants' compatibility and predict their final pairings.

=== Panelists ===
- Yoon Jong-shin
- Lee Chung-ah
- Choi Si-won
- Mimi (Oh My Girl)
- Park Ji-sun

=== Cast ===
Name	Birth year	Occupation	Notes
Shin Woo-jae (신우재)	1990	Painter	
Ahn Ji-min (안지민)	1992	Strategic planner for Samsung (Graduated from Department of Electrical Engineering at Sungkyunkwan University)	
Lee Chan-hyung (이찬형)	1992	Doctor and businessman (Graduated from College of Medicine at Hallym University, Master of Medicine and PhD at Seoul National University)	
Park Chang-hwan(박창환)	1984	Pilot (Graduated from Department of Aviation Transportation at Korea Aerospace University)	
Lee Sang-yoon(이상윤)	1996	Model (Graduated from Department of Physical Education at Dongguk University)	
Lee Je-yeon (이제연)	1995	Lawyer (Graduated from Department of Public Administration and Law at Yonsei University)	
Moon Ji-won (문지원)	1999	Semiconductor Engineer at Samsung (Graduated from Department of Electronic Engineering at Kookmin University)	
Joo Ha-neul (주하늘)	1998	Dancer and model (Graduated from Department of Performance Arts and Master's at Korea National Sport University)	
Bae Chae-eun (배채은)	1996	Researcher (Graduated from Department of Natural Science and Media Studies at University of Toronto)	
Kim Soo-a	1993	HR Team employee (Graduated from Hankuk University of Foreign Studies)	

Final Results

Confession Result
Participants
Lee Chan-hyung	↔	Bae Chae-eun
Shin Woo-jae	↔	Moon Ji-won
Ahn Ji-min	↔	Lee Je-yeon
Park Chang-hwan	→	Kim Soo-a
Kim Soo-a	→	Lee Sang-yoon
Lee Sang-yoon	→	Lee Je-yeon
Joo Ha-neul	→	Ahn Ji-min

== Aftermath ==
Seo Joo-won from Season 1 got married in 2018 to YouTuber Aori (Kim Min-young) and got divorced in 2022.

Kim Do-gyun from Season 2 got married in 2022 to a non-celebrity who is a yoga instructor. Im Hyun-joo dated actor Kwak Si-yang between 2023 until November 2024. Lee Gyu-bin from Season 2 proposed in 2025 to model Ahn Sun-mi, and the couple announced their engagement.

Park Ji-hyun from Season 3 got married in 2023 to a non-celebrity who is a businessman.

Shin Min-gyu and Yoo Yi-soo from Season 4 dated between April 2023 until late 2024. Kim Ji-young from Season 4 announced her marriage to a non-celebrity and pregnancy in January 2026.

Ahn Ji-min and Lee Je-yeon from the spin-off, Heart Pairing, dated until October 2025. Shin Woo-jae and Moon Ji-won from the spin-off are still currently in a relationship.

== Controversies ==
Season 1

In 2019, Heart Signal cast member Kang Sung-wook was sentenced to five years in prison for sexually assaulting a woman in August 2017. Fellow cast member Jang Cheon reportedly initially served as Kang's lawyer in the case but resigned after six days. Kang's sentence was reduced to 30 months in prison in 2020.

Season 2

Heart Signal 2 cast member Kim Hyun-woo was arrested for drunk driving in April 2018 while the show was airing.

Season 3

After the cast members of Heart Signal 3 were publicly announced, a woman accused cast member Lee Ga-heun of bullying classmates. Cast member Cheon An-na was also accused of bullying. The show's producers denied the allegations.

While the show was airing, another woman told the media that cast member Kim Kang-yeol had kicked her in the stomach at a nightclub in January 2017. Kim admitted to the incident and apologized on social media.

In May 2023, Yongsan Police Station in Seoul applied for an arrest warrant for Seo Min-jae on charges of violating the Narcotics Control Act. This suspicion was raised when Seo Min-jae made an SNS post revealing that she and her then boyfriend, Nam Tae-hyun, took methamphetamine in August 2022. In September 2022, the police finally collected the hair and urine of Seo Min-jae and Nam Tae-hyun, who were suspected of violating the Narcotics Control Act, and requested an appraisal from the National Institute of Scientific Investigation (NFS).

Season 4

In June 2026, a series of private Instagram stories of Kim Ji-min was leaked which included political comments, using derogatory expression against her mother, display of her boyfriend's gifts, and slandering comments against Single's Inferno 5's Park Hee-sun. She later posted an apology letter and announced legal actions.

Season 5

In June 2026, an anonymous netizen claimed in a post that Jeong Gyu-ri was having an affair with a married man whose wife had recently given birth. An alleged photo of the two kissing in an elevator was included in the post.
