= Brain-fficial =

South Korean web television program on History Korea

- Hangul: 뇌피셜
- RR: Noepisyeol
- MR: Noep'isyŏl
- Genre: Talk show Debate show Web television
- Presented by: Kim Jong-min
- Country of origin: South Korea
- Original language: Korean
- No. of seasons: 2
- No. of episodes: Season 1: 10; Season 2: 40

Production
- Producers: Go Dong-wan; Kim Joo Hyung
- Production location: South Korea

Original release
- Network: History Korea
- Release: July 19, 2018 – present

Brain-fficial (Korean: 뇌피셜) is a South Korean web television program on the History Korea channel, hosted by Kim Jong-min. Every week, a different guest appears, to have a one-on-one debate with Kim Jong-min on various topics. The show has aired on the channel's official YouTube, Naver and Facebook channels, starting from July 19, 2018.

On November 5, 2018, Brain-fficial opened its new channel and new episodes were released starting from November 15, 2018, after the last episode that was released previously on September 20, 2018.

On Season 2, the title of the show was changed from My Brain-fficial to Brain-fficial.

Starting from December 26, 2018, Brain-fficial started airing every Wednesday instead of every Thursday at 5pm KST.

== Episodes ==
=== Season 1 ===
No.	Date of Release	Debate Topic	Stand	Good-talker
1	July 19, 2018	Do aliens exist?	Kim Jong-min: No; Jessie: Yes	Jessie
2	July 26, 2018	Is male Brazilian waxing necessary?	Kim Jong-min: Necessary; Yang Se-chan: Not necessary	Yang Se-chan
3	August 2, 2018	Is alcohol your foe or your friend?	Kim Jong-min: Alcohol is your foe Shin Ji: Alcohol is your friend	Shin Ji
4	August 9, 2018	Is there a correlation between blood types and personalities?	Kim Jong-min: No correlation DIA: There is a correlation	Chae-yeon, Jueun and Somyi of DIA
5	August 16, 2018	Do such things as ghosts exist in this world?	Kim Jong-min: No; Haha: Yes	Haha
6	August 23, 2018	Which is better, JonBuh or YeoPo?	Kim Jong-min: JonBuh is the best Hong Jin-young: YeoPo are the best	Hong Jin-young
7	August 30, 2018	Impromptu battle	—N/a	YooA
8	September 6, 2018	Which hero in Marvel is the strongest of them all?	Kim Jong-min: Thor; Hyejeong: Dr. Strange; Lee Seung-gook: Scarlet Witch	Hyejeong of AOA and Lee Seung-gook
9	September 13, 2018	Which one is more accurate, Saju or Physiognomy?	Kim Jong-min: Saju; Kim Hee-chul : Physiognomy	Kim Hee-chul and Park Sung-jun
10	September 20, 2018	Which one is more accurate, Saju or Physiognomy?	Kim Jong-min: Saju; Kim Hee-chul : Physiognomy	Kim Hee-chul and Park Sung-jun

=== Season 2 ===
No.	Date of Release	Debate Topic	Stand	Good-talker
1	November 15, 2018	Are friendships between men and women possible?	Kim Jong-min: Impossible; Cha Tae-hyun: Possible	Cha Tae-hyun
2	November 22, 2018	Does food taste good when roasted or when eaten raw?	Kim Jong-min: Food tastes good when it's roasted. Defconn: Food must be eaten raw	Defconn
3	November 29, 2018	Can a person tell a white lie?	Kim Jong-min: One can tell a white lie Gugudan's Sejeong, Nayoung and Hana: One should not tell a white lie	Gugudan's Sejeong, Nayoung and Hana
4	December 6, 2018	Will you save a little bit of your salary or invest everything you have?	Kim Jong-min: Save a little bit of your salary to invest Kim Joon-ho: Invest everything at one shot	Kim Joon-ho
5	December 13, 2018	Is SNS your friend or your enemy?	Kim Jong-min: SNS is my enemy Shin Ji: SNS is my friend	Shin Ji and Bbaek Ga
6	December 20, 2018	Collection of viewers' topics	—N/a	Ji Sang-ryeol
7	December 26, 2018	—N/a	—N/a	DDOTTY
8	January 2, 2019	Is geomancy a superstition or science?	Kim Jong-min: The geomancy is supertition Han Bo-reum: Geomancy is science	Han Bo-reum
9	January 6, 2019	Do people have superpowers?	Kim Jong-min: No; Kim Gun-mo: Yes	Kim Gun-mo
No.	Date of Release	Debate Topic	Stand	Expert
10	January 9, 2019	—N/a	—N/a	Kim Sung-jun (A calendarist)
No.	Date of Release	Debate Topic	Stand	Good-talker
11	January 16, 2019	What is the best martial arts in practice?	Kim Jong-min: Kendo; Sleepy: Jiu Jitsu; DinDin: Boxing	DinDin and Sleepy
12	January 23, 2019	Can you lend your money with your best friend?	Kim Jong-min: Cannot; Hong Jin-kyung: Can	Hong Jin-kyung
13	January 30, 2019	What is the strongest of the three human needs?	Kim Jong-min: Sleeping; Kim Joon-ho: Sexual desire Defconn: Appetite	Kim Joon-ho and Defconn
14	February 6, 2019	—N/a	—N/a	—N/a
15	February 13, 2019	—N/a	—N/a	Shin Ji and Bbaek Ga
16	February 20, 2019	Where can you see a man's style?	Kim Jong-min: Clothes; Shindong: Hair	Shindong (Super Junior)
17	February 27, 2019	What is ramen to you?	Kim Jong-min: Ramen is ramen in the bag. Jung Eun-ji: Ramen is cup ramen.	Apink's Jung Eun-ji
18	March 6, 2019	What is the standard of old man?	TBA	Parc Jae-jung, Kang Yu-mi and Christian Burgos
19	March 13, 2019	What is the representative sport of Korea?	Kim Jong-min: Golf; Park Sung-kwang: Baseball; GAMST: Football	Park Sung-kwang and GAMST
20	March 20, 2019	Do you believe there is a thing call "previous life"?	Kim Jong-min: No; Solbi: Yes	Solbi
21	March 27, 2019	Do doppelgangers exist?	Kim Jong-min: No; Hong Jin-ho: Yes	Hong Jin-ho
22	April 3, 2019	—N/a	—N/a	Shin Ji and Bbaek Ga
23	April 10, 2019	TBA	TBA	Chan Mi, Young Bin and Genius SKLee
24	April 17, 2019	—N/a	—N/a	
25	April 25, 2019	TBA	TBA	Kwanghee
26	May 1, 2019	Is human nature good or bad?	Kim Jong-min; Moon Se-yoon: Good	Moon Se-yoon
27	May 8	TBA	TBA	Dayoung, Soobin and Yoo Yeon-jung (WJSN)
28	May 15	TBA	TBA	Doyeon, Yoojung and Sei (Weki Miki)
29	May 21	TBA	TBA	Hwang Jae-seong and Lee Jin-ho
30	June 6	TBA	TBA	Lee Yong-jin
31	June 12	TBA	TBA	Kim Ji-min and Kim Min-kyung
32	July 3	TBA	TBA	Yoo Byung-jae
33	July 19	—N/a	—N/a	Chaebin, Sunshine, Saebom (Nature) and Shin Ji
34	July 31	TBA	TBA	Jang Do-yeon
35	September 18	TBA	TBA	Ahn Il-kwon, Micky Gwang-soo
36	September 25	TBA	TBA	Lee Sang-jun
36	October 2, 2019	TBA	TBA	SinB, Umji (GFriend)
36	October 9, 2019	TBA	TBA	Exy, Seola, Soobin (Cosmic Girls)
37	October 10, 2019	TBA	TBA	Yoo Min-sang
38	October 16, 2019	Are superstitions reliable?	Kim Jong-min: Not reliable Eun Ji-won: Reliable	Eun Ji-won
39	October 23, 2019	TBA	TBA	
40	October 30, 2019	TBA	TBA	Oh Ha-young (Apink)
41	November 6, 2019	TBA	TBA	Jang Gyu-ri, Lee Na-gyung, Lee Chae-young (Fromis 9)

== Notes ==
This is a special episode. Rather than the usual way where there is a fixed topic for every episode, for this episode, they will randomly choose three out of a number of colored balls and debate about the topic written on the slip of paper within.

This is another special episode where there's no fixed topic, but rather, they collected the viewers' topics and discuss 3 of them.

This is a special episode which is released on Sunday rather than the usual Wednesday in collaboration with My Little Old Boy.

This is a special episode which features Jong-min completing his 100 thousand subscribers pledge by singing 'Our Dream' (One Piece OST Part 1 Korean Version) which was sung originally by Koyote.

During this week, the edited version of Brain-fficial's 1st live YouTube video was released instead of the usual debating episode.

For this week, the edited version of Brain-fficial × KYT 20th Anniversary Fan Meeting live YouTube video was released instead of the usual debating episode.

This is a special episode to celebrate Brain-fficial YouTube channel's 1st Anniversary.

== Awards and Norminations ==
Year	Award	Category	Result	Ref.
2019	2019 New Media Content	Web Arts	TBA	
