= Eric Nam =

American singer-songwriter (born 1988)

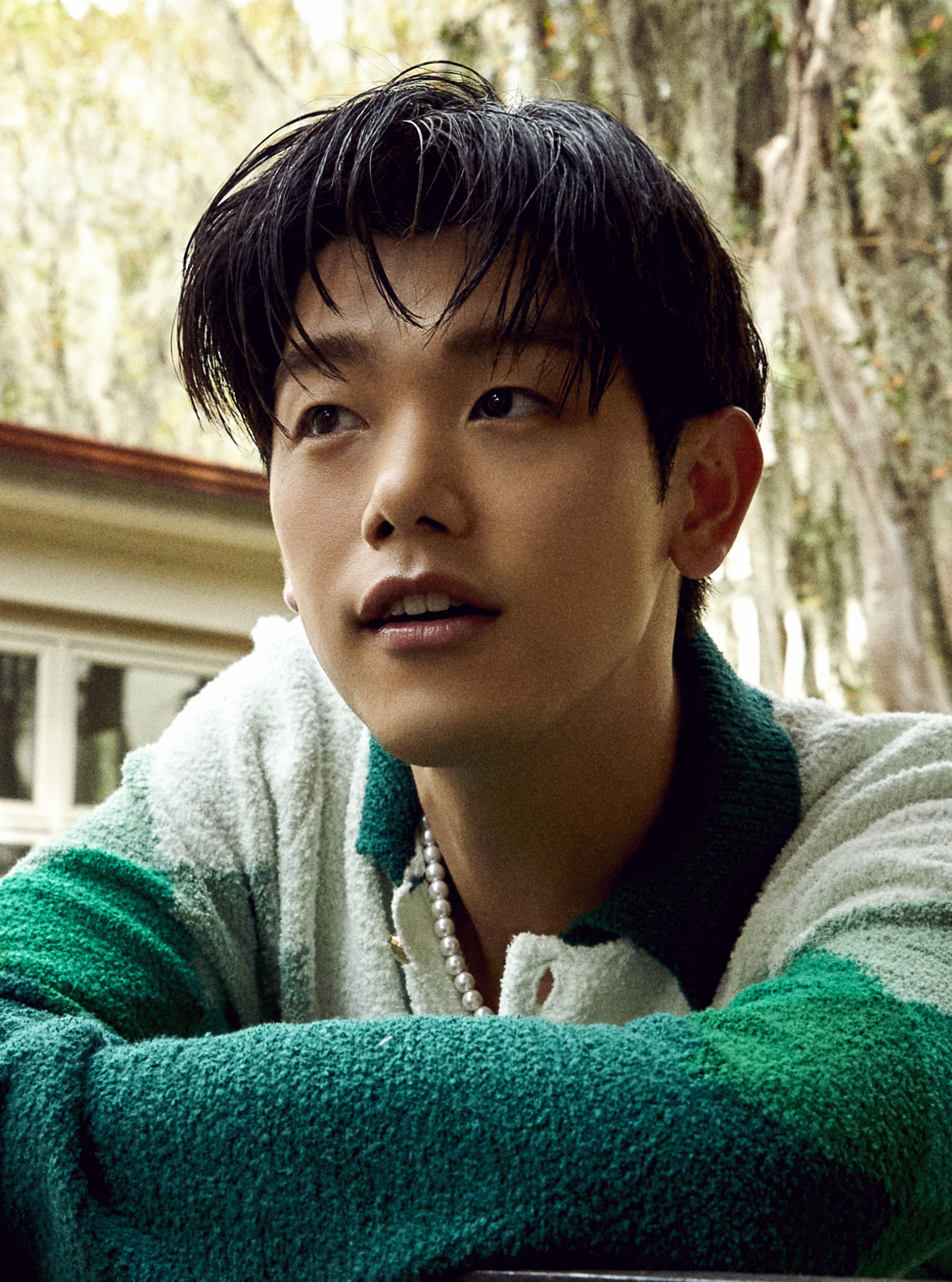
- Nam in September 2021
- Born: November 17, 1988 (age 37); Atlanta, Georgia, U.S.
- Education: Boston College (BA)
- Occupations: Singer; songwriter; television personality; actor
- Musical career
- Origin: South Korea
- Genres: K-pop; R&B; EDM
- Instrument: Vocals
- Years active: 2011–present
- Labels: B2M; CJ ENM; The Eric Nam Company
- Website: Official website

Korean name
- Hangul: 남윤도
- RR: Nam Yundo
- MR: Nam Yundo

Eric Nam (Korean: 에릭남; born November 17, 1988) is an American singer-songwriter, television personality, and actor who began his career in K-pop in 2013. One of the most recognizable figures in South Korea, he has since been named GQ Korea's Man of the Year, selected for Forbes' 30 Under 30 Asia, and honored as a Time100 Impact Award recipient in 2023.

== Early life and education ==
Eric Nam was born and raised in Atlanta, Georgia. He is the eldest of three boys. He graduated from Boston College in 2011 with a major in International Studies and a minor in Asian Studies. Nam accepted a position as a business analyst at Deloitte Consulting in New York City, deferring the opportunity to participate in microfinance initiatives in India. He subsequently decided to pursue a career in entertainment.

== Career ==
=== 2011–2012: Career beginnings ===
After a cover Nam posted on YouTube gained media attention, South Korean broadcasting company MBC invited Nam to Seoul to compete on the program Star Audition: Birth of a Great Star 2, a show similar to the music competition television series The X Factor. His final placement within the top five contestants started his career in South Korea.

On September 25, 2012, Nam signed with B2M Entertainment as a solo artist.

=== 2013–2015: Debut with Cloud 9 and hosting ===
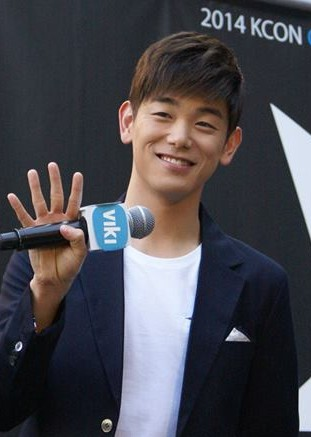
Eric Nam in 2014

On January 23, 2013, Nam made his debut with the release of his first extended play (EP) Cloud 9 with lead single "Heaven's Door". That year, Nam also joined Arirang TV's interactive show After School Club and its spin-off, The ASC After Show, as MC. He left the program in 2016, to focus on his music career. His appearances on After School Club and MBC's Section TV Entertainment Relay were positively received and helped established Nam as one of the "go-to" personalities for international celebrity interviews in South Korea.

In April 2014, Nam released his first digital single, "우우 (Ooh Ooh)", and performed at the Seoul Jazz Festival alongside artists such as Chris Botti, Damien Rice, Jamie Cullum, Paolo Nutini, and Craig David. In December, Nam released his second digital single, "Melt My Heart".

In February 2015, Nam featured on Amber Liu's song "I Just Wanna" from her EP Beautiful. In March, he released the single "I'm OK" and its accompanying music video. In May, Nam released the single "Dream", featuring 15&'s Park Ji-min, for charity. In December, Nam signed an exclusive contract with CJ ENM.

=== 2016–2017: Interview and first US releases ===
Nam released his second EP, Interview, with the lead single "Good For You" on March 24, 2016. That same month, he also took part in SM Entertainment's digital music channel SM Station, releasing the duet "Spring Love" with Red Velvet's Wendy. On April 16, Nam hosted and performed on Saturday Night Live Korea, receiving one of the highest ratings of the season. Later that month, Nam joined the virtual marriage show We Got Married with Mamamoo's Solar as his partner.

On June 10, Nam released his first US single, "Into You", a collaboration with electronic band KOLAJ. "Into You" premiered worldwide on Beats 1 Radio and The Fader, charting at a number one on Hype Machine. Later that month, Nam headlined KCON NY 2016 and performed five songs, including "Into You", to a sold-out crowd at Prudential Center. He then released his digital single "Can't Help Myself" in July 2016, with lyrics written by Epik High's Tablo and featuring rapper Loco. Nam also headlined KCON LA 2016 and performed "Can't Help Myself" and "Into You" with KOLAJ to a sold-out Staples Center.

Nam became the host of the Mnet talk show Yang and Nam Show alongside comedian Yang Se-hyung in November 2016. Additionally, he premiered his collaboration with producer Timbaland, "Body", at the 2016 Mnet Asian Music Awards.

In 2017, Nam collaborated with singer Gallant and rapper Tablo on the single "Cave Me In". The song premiered worldwide on Beats 1 Radio and trended globally on YouTube and Facebook for over 72 hours after its release. The music video was shot in Hong Kong. Nam also featured on Seohyun's "Hello" from her EP Don't Say No and collaborated with Jeon Somi on the single "You, Who?". Furthermore, Nam featured on DJ and record producer Arty's single "Idea of You". Nam performed three sold-out shows in New York City and Atlanta in August 2017, with singer Alec Benjamin as his opening act. The shows sold out in one minute during presale; due to overwhelming demand, Nam added the date in Atlanta and increased the venue size in New York City.

=== 2018: Honestly and North American tour ===
At the 2018 Winter Olympics in South Korea, Nam was named an Honorary Ambassador. He appeared on the primetime Olympic broadcast of American television network NBC, providing an in-depth look at K-pop with interviewers Johnny Weir and Tara Lipinski.

On April 11, 2018, Nam released his third EP, Honestly. Led by singles "Honestly" and "Potion", the latter of which featured rapper Woodie GoChild and was released before the album on April 9. Honestly leaned into synth and electropop while including some dancehall and reggaeton influences. Nam worked with numerous songwriters on the EP, including Brian Lee, Tablo, and Jake Torrey. Additionally, Nam stated that the members of BTS helped provide him with feedback as he was creating the record. Honestly debuted at number six on the Billboard World Album charts. In June, Nam embarked on the Honestly Tour, which encompassed 15 shows in 14 cities across North America and featured pop duo Loote as special guest. On July 21, Nam performed at We the Fest in Jakarta, Indonesia, he was the only Korean act in the line-up that year.

Later that summer, Nam released the song "Float", which he co-wrote with producer Kool Kojak. The song was selected by Sony Pictures for the official soundtrack for the film Hotel Transylvania 3: Summer Vacation, which reached number one at the US box office upon release. Nam also featured on a remix for "Your Side of the Bed" with Loote.

=== 2019–2020: Before We Begin, world tour, and The Other Side ===
On May 8, 2019, Nam released the digital single "Runaway". On April 17, he debuted his weekly podcast show, K-Pop Daebak w/ Eric Nam. The show was named "New & Noteworthy" and "Best Listens of 2019" by Apple Podcasts, as well as "Top 10 Music Podcasts" by Spotify in 2019. On November 14, Nam released his first English album Before We Begin, which marked the start of a new sound and "his transition from K-pop star to global pop singer-songwriter." He noted in an interview with Highsnobiety that he felt "much more expressive in English" since he believed that his previous process of translating English lyrics to Korean caused his music to "lose so much of [the] sentiment" he intended to convey. Nam released his second podcast show, I Think You're Dope w/ Eric Nam, on December 10. The show reached number one on the Music Podcast Charts in over 25 countries, including the US, UK, and South Korea.

On January 9, 2020, Nam embarked on his first official world tour, the Before We Begin World Tour. The tour was set to visit 34 cities across Asia, North America, and Latin America; however, in March 2020, Nam announced the cancellation of the final two Los Angeles shows and Latin American leg due to the COVID-19 pandemic. On July 30, 2020, Nam released his fourth Korean EP, The Other Side. In an interview, he described the record as "a little more playful, a little more upbeat, a little brighter" than his previous releases. The title track "The Other Side" and lead single "Paradise" saw success in South Korea and other Asian countries. Day6 vocalist Young K co-wrote four of the songs with Nam.

=== 2021–2022: There and Back Again ===
On May 21, 2021, Nam released the single "Echo", a collaboration with Indian singer and composer Armaan Malik and Indian-American composer Kshmr. On June 4, it was confirmed that Nam's contract with CJ E&M had expired. On October 15, Nam released the digital single "I Don't Know You Anymore", his first independent release. On October 19, Nam announced his There and Back Again World Tour 2022 and released the digital single "Any Other Way" on November 12.

On January 7, 2022, Nam released his second English album There and Back Again, which included the previously released singles "I Don't Know You Anymore" and "Any Other Way". Nam began the There And Back Again World Tour in Phoenix on January 24, visiting cities throughout North America, Europe, and the South Pacific. He embarked on an Asia tour extension that included six cities across Southeast Asia, concluding on November 20 in Seoul.

=== 2023–2024: There and Back Again (Reimagined), House on a Hill, and Lollapalooza India ===
On March 3, 2023, Nam released There and Back Again (Reimagined), a re-recording of all the songs that he had released on his There and Back Again album in 2022. He offered insights on re-recording the songs with the intention to give them a second life in today's increasingly short attention spans when it comes to music. Working with producer docskim to bring cinematic arrangements, Nam hoped to encourage listeners to revisit the tracks and find new depth in them. "I feel like art has been so short, so I wanted to give people a reason to go back to some of the songs I think were great because they weren't the single."

On September 8, 2023, Nam released his third English album, House on a Hill, which included four music videos and a short film, marking his directorial debut. Nam shared that the inspiration behind the first single, "House on a Hill," and subsequent tracks, "Don't Leave Yet," "Only for a Moment," "I Wish I Wasn't Me," and more centered on facing an existential crisis. He was self-reflecting on what he was feeling and thinking about life.

Following the new album release, Nam started his House on a Hill World Tour in Florida on September 21, making stops throughout North America, Latin America, Asia, Europe, and Oceania that spanned from 2023 to 2024. He completed his tour with an Encore show in Los Angeles at the Teragram Ballroom on May 4, 2024. Notable guests included Em Beihold, Lyn Lapid, and Gallant. Soon after, Nam released House on a Hill (Deluxe) on May 10, with four new tracks "In My Mind" with Zak Abel, "Strawberries," "Wish I Didn't Care" with Lyn Lapid, and "Hypochondriac".

During his House on a Hill World Tour, Nam performed at Lollapalooza India on January 28, 2024, at the Mahalaxmi Race Course in Mumbai as part of the two-day festival, featuring artists such as Sting, Jonas Brothers, Halsey, and The Rose. He was part of the line-up on the second day, playing on one of the main stages and performing his collaboration with Armaan Malik "Echo" for the first time together. Rolling Stone India did a cover story on Nam, discussing his thoughts of performing in India and connecting with his fans there to share his music and journey.

On August 22, 2024, Nam collaborated with Japanese rock band, Novelbright, on a new single, Everywhere I Go, released in English and Japanese versions, and released a music video which they filmed together.

In addition to music-related activities, Nam made his official acting debut in the feature, Transplant. The film premiered at the Chicago International Film Festival with two screenings on October 18 and 19. Nam was in attendance with writer-director Jason Park and producer Nina Yang Bongiovi. The film was also screened at the Philadelphia Film Festival and Virginia Film Festival.

=== 2025–present: Live From London, Transplant, acting projects, and The Traitors ===
Having livestreamed the London concert of his House on a Hill World Tour, Nam released the Live From London album digitally on April 16, 2025. The full concert premiered on his YouTube channel on June 13 and a vinyl album was released on September 12.

On the acting front, Transplant continued making its film festival circuit in various cities, including the Manchester Film Festival, where the film was screened on March 22, 2025, and received the Best International Feature Award. On May 2, the film was part of the line-up at the Los Angeles Asian Pacific Film Festival. Nam attended the screening with Jason Park, Nina Yang Bongiovi, and fellow cast member, Michelle Okkyung Lee, who plays the role of Nam's mother in the psychological thriller. On August 3, Transplant was the Centerpiece Presentation at the Asian American International Film Festival in New York.

Furthering his acting projects, Nam was announced to voice the adult role of Aang in the animated film, Avatar Aang: The Last Airbender on May 16, 2025. The film was released on July 25th 2026, on Paramount+.

On June 13, 2025, Nam was announced as one of the contestants competing on the fourth season of The Traitors US on Peacock. This was Nam's first appearance on a reality television show in America. The season premiered on January 8, 2026, with the first three episodes being released on the same day. Nam was originally a "Faithful" contestant until being recruited as a "Traitor" in episode 9. The season concluded on February 26, with Nam finishing in third place behind Maura Higgins and Rob Rausch. Nam attended the Season 4 Premiere Watch Party held at The Abbey in West Hollywood.

On July 22, 2025, it was announced that Nam had landed the leading role in a K-pop film alongside Ji-young Yoo. This film is a joint production between Paramount Pictures and HYBE America, directed by Benson Lee and scheduled to be released on February 12, 2027. The film is expected to be the first major American studio film shot entirely in South Korea. Additional talents had joined the cast, and filming had been completed in November 2025.

On October 3, 2025, Nam was in talks to be cast in the thriller, Loser, Radio Silence's feature adaptation of the short film by Colleen McGuinness. He has since been confirmed for the role and filming had been completed in December 2025.

On January 5, 2026, Nam was announced as an artist collaboration with CeREELs' new animated series BIRD, lending his vocals to a new song featured in the animation. This series is from the studio behind Ella Gator, created with indie animator, Hoazi.

Nam appeared at Nasdaq along with several cast members of The Traitors US season 4 to ring the closing bell on January 21, 2026.

On March 3, 2026, Nam released a new single entitled How the Fire Started with a music video featuring fellow cast members from The Traitors US, including Rob Rausch, Maura Higgins, Ron Funches, Natalie Anderson, and Yam Yam Arocho. This song signifies Nam's return to music as he prepares for the release of several singles followed by a full album release this summer and an upcoming world tour.

On March 20, 2026, Nam continued the momentum of his latest single release by introducing the official visualizer for How the Fire Started.

On April 15, 2026, Nam appeared on the TODAY Show to talk about his experience on The Traitors US and filming the How the Fire Started music video with castmates. He also teased the title of his upcoming album Confessions of a Lonely Heart, slated for a fall release. As part of the Citi Concert Series of the show, Nam performed How the Fire Started live.

On May 2, 2026, Nam was one of the performers in a line-up with Audrey Nuna and MILLI at Feria Nacional de San Marcos in Aguascalientes, Mexico. He performed a series of his hits, including his recent single How the Fire Started and his upcoming release Miss Me More. Nam later shared a recap of the experience via his socials.

On May 27, 2026, after teasing his next single Miss Me More on his various channels, Nam has officially posted the release date will be June 5, 2026. He has been actively sharing the pre-save link for this single.

On May 29, 2026, the previously announced title of his movie K-Pop Superstar: The Movie has now been changed to K-Pop: The Debut with the theatrical release date pushed back to Feb. 26, 2027.

On June 5, 2026, Nam made a series of announcements alongside the release of Miss Me More, his follow-up single from the upcoming album, Confessions of a Lonely Heart. The song depicts how one might feel towards an ex post-break-up, hoping for that person to miss you more. The music video was released on Nam's official YouTube channel. He also posted about his physical album for Confessions of a Lonely Heart being available for pre-order as a signed vinyl and as a CD plus photobook. Currently, he has plans to perform 3 live shows in New York City (Sept. 9, 10, and 11) at The Bowery Ballroom, followed by 2 live shows in Los Angeles (Sept. 17 and 18) at The Roxy. These shows at smaller venues are intended for a more intimate and interactive experience between Nam and his fans as the goal behind this new album is to connect with others who share the same lonely sentiments and to build community.

At the Las Culturistas Culture Awards 2026 aired on June 17, 2026, Nam won the Most Surprising Snack Award and delivered a viral acceptance speech.

Nam was invited to be a panelist at Stavros Niarchos Foundation (SNF) Nostos 2026, Resonant voices: Culture, creators, and youth mental health, speaking about mental health and his approach on his music and content as a songwriter and creator on June 22, 2026 in Athens, Greece. He also spoke as a panelist at Cannes Lions 2026, Brand Love Matches for Cultural Heat and Business Impact, sharing his thoughts on brand values and brand partnerships on June 25, 2026 in Cannes, France.

=== Awards and achievements ===
Nam has been known for being a mental health advocate. As the co-founder and creative director of DIVE Studios, he launched the mental wellness self-care app, Mindset. He was recognized in 2023 as one of the recipients of the TIME100 Impact Awards for his contributions in raising awareness on mental health issues.

In June 2024, Nam was the Voice of Mental Health Award Honoree at The Jed Foundation Annual Gala. Nam shared, "Mental health is universal; it impacts how every one of us shows up in the world. Prioritizing self-care and valuing our mental health as much as our physical health is essential to being the best version of ourselves. There should be no shame in nurturing all aspects of our well-being."

DIVE Studios was honored the ADCOLOR CATALYST Award in 2024, and Nam received the award on behalf of everyone at DIVE in November 2024.

=== Other television appearances ===
In 2020, Nam appeared in Phil Rosenthal's Netflix food travel show, Somebody Feed Phil, in the season 3 Seoul episode, where they explored Korean food such as tteok-bokki, fried chicken and beer (chimaek), and crab.

In 2021, Nam was seen as a guest on Padma Lakshmi's Taste the Nation on Hulu as part of the "K-Town Countdown (Holiday Edition)," where he shared an easy way of making Korean sweet pancakes (hotteok).

In 2024, Nam and Reid Scott guested on Chrissy & Dave Dine Out's "Those Wings Tho!" episode in the third episode of season 1 along with Chrissy Teigen, David Chang, and Joel Kim Booster, Nam and Scott examined cultural identity through the food at Yangban Society, a modern American restaurant merging the Korean and Jewish upbringing of chefs Katianna and John Hong.

In 2025, DIVE Studios was featured on Eugene Levy's The Reluctant Traveler "Trendsetting in South Korea" episode in the fifth episode of season 3 on Apple TV. Nam appeared with Ashley Choi, Peniel Shin, and JUNNY, who are hosts of the DIVE podcast, GET REAL.

In 2026, Nam appeared as a guest on The Dave Chang Show on April 6. He also appeared as a guest along with fellow The Traitors US castmate, Kristen Kish, on June 8 in the fifth episode of The Puzzle Room with David Kwong. Both shows can be viewed on Netflix.

=== Brand partnerships ===
From February to April 2025, Nam was the host of an original Korean food truck series Stop N Snack on YouTube by Samyang Foods in collaboration with the ROUNDStudios production team. Along with celebrity chefs, artists, and other talents, Nam visited high schools in America to introduce them to Korean food. The guests worked together to prepare the meals and talked with the students to get their honest take on the food.

In June 2025, Nam filmed a series of promotional videos for Delta Air Lines and Korean Air to allow viewers to learn about new routes and direct flights between Seoul and Utah through showcasing local food and scenic places to visit.

On April 25, 2026, DIVE Studios in partnership with Airbnb hosted the first-ever live taping of Eric's Daebak Show with his fans as guests as part of the "Airbnb Experiences" program.

On May 22, 2026, DIVE Studios posted a video featuring Nam with his brothers, Eddie and Brian, spending an adventurous 3 days at the Walt Disney World Resort, sponsored by Disney.

=== Event hosting ===
Being fluent in English and Korean, Nam has hosted several major Korean events and awards ceremonies with an international audience. In November 2024, Nam co-hosted the inaugural TikTok Korea Awards in Seoul and was the red carpet correspondent for the first U.S. ceremony of the MAMA Awards in Los Angeles.

== Discography ==
- Before We Begin (2019)
- There and Back Again (2022)
- House on a Hill (2023)
- Confessions of a Lonely Heart (2026)

== Concert tours ==
- Honestly Tour (2018–2019)
- Before We Begin World Tour (2020)
- There And Back Again World Tour (2022)
- House on a Hill World Tour (2023–2024)

== Filmography ==
=== Film ===
Film appearances
Year	Title	Role	Notes	Ref.
2024	Transplant	Jonah Yoon		
2026	Avatar Aang: The Last Airbender	Aang (voice)		
2027	K-Pop: The Debut	Kevin Park		
TBA	Loser	TBA		

=== Television ===
Year	Title	Role	Notes	Ref.
2011–2012	Birth of A Great Singer 2	Contestant		
2013–2016	After School Club	Host		
2014	Section TV	Host		
2015	King of Mask Singer	Contestant	As "Hello Mr. Monkey"	
2015–2016	No Oven Dessert 2	Host		
2016	We Got Married	Cast member	With Mamamoo's Solar	
2016	Daddy and I	Cast member		
2016	Law of the Jungle in Mongolia	Cast member		
2016	Saturday Night Live Korea	Guest host	Episode 8	
2016–2017	Yang and Nam Show	Host	With Yang Se-hyung	
2017–2018	Wizard of Nowhere	Cast member		
2018	2018 Winter Olympics	Honorary Ambassador	Featured on NBC prime time	
2018	Battle Trip	Special host	Episodes 85–86	
2018–2019	Grandma's Restaurant in Samcheong-dong	Cast member		
2019	King of Mask Singer	Contestant	As "Broccoli"	
2019	The Loud House	Yoon Kwan	Episode: "Pranks for the Memories with the Casagrandes"	
2020	Somebody Feed Phil	Himself	Season 3, Episode 4	
2021	Doing The Most with Phoebe Robinson	Himself	Season 1, Episode 10	
2021	Taste the Nation with Padma Lakshmi	Himself	Episode 204	
2024	Chrissy & Dave Dine Out	Himself	Season 1, Episode 3	
2025	The Reluctant Traveler with Eugene Levy	Himself	Season 3, Episode 5	
2026	The Traitors US	Contestant	Season 4, Episodes 1-11 and Reunion	
2026	The Dave Chang Show	Himself	April 6 Episode	
2026	The Puzzle Room with David Kwong	Himself	Episode 5 with Kristen Kish	
2026	The Kelly Clarkson Show	Himself	June 17 Episode	

== Awards and nominations ==
Name of the award ceremony, year presented, category, nominee of the award, and the result of the nomination
Award ceremony	Year	Category	Nominee / Work	Result	Ref.
KBS Entertainment Awards	2018	Best Newcomer Award - Variety	Grandma's Restaurant in Samcheong-dong	Won	
MBC Entertainment Awards	2016	Best Couple (with Solar)	We Got Married	Won	
Mnet Asian Music Awards	2016	Best Collaboration (with Wendy)	"Spring Love"	Nominated	
Mnet Asian Music Awards	2016	Best Vocal Performance – Male Solo	"Good For You"	Nominated	
Culture Awards	2026	Most Surprising Snack	Eric Nam	Won	

=== Listicles ===
Publisher	Year	Listle	Placement	Ref.
GQ Korea	2016	Men of the Year	Included	
Forbes	2017	30 Under 30 – Asia	Included	
Time	2023	TIME100 Impact Award	Included	
The Jed Foundation	2024	Voice of Mental Health Award	Included	
