= 2018 KBS Entertainment Awards =

16th edition of award ceremony

- Awarded for: Excellence in variety entertainment
- Date: December 22, 2018
- Site: KBS New Wing Open Hall, Yeouido-dong, Yeongdeungpo-gu, Seoul
- Hosted by: Shin Hyun-joon; Yoon Shi-yoon; Seolhyun (AOA)

Television coverage
- Network: KBS2, KBS World
- Duration: 250 minutes
- Viewership: Ratings: 7.1% (Part 1); 8.2% (Part 2); 7.7% (Part 3); Viewership:1.577 million

The 2018 KBS Entertainment Awards presented by Korean Broadcasting System (KBS), took place on December 22, 2018 at KBS New Wing Open Hall in Yeouido-dong, Yeongdeungpo-gu, Seoul. It was hosted by Shin Hyun-joon, Yoon Shi-yoon and AOA's Seolhyun.

== Nominations and winners ==
(Winners denoted in bold)

Grand Prize (Daesang)		Viewers' Choice Best Program Award
**Lee Young-ja** – **Hello Counselor**, **Red Cheek You**; Kim Jun-ho – 2 Days & 1 Night, Gag Concert; Lee Dong-gook – The Return of Superman; Shin Dong-yup – Hello Counselor, Immortal Songs: Singing the Legend; Yoo Jae-suk – Happy Together Season 4		**2 Days & 1 Night Season 3**; Gag Concert; Happy Together Season 4; Hello Counselor; Immortal Songs: Singing the Legend; Mr. House Husband; The Return of Superman
Top Excellence Award
Variety Category	Talk/Show Category	Comedy Category
**Defconn** – **2 Days & 1 Night**; **Sam Hammington** – **The Return of Superman**; Kim Jong-min – 2 Days & 1 Night; Song Eun-i – Problem Child in House	**Kim Sook** – **Battle Trip**; **Moon Hee-joon** – **Immortal Songs: Singing the Legend**; Jun Hyun-moo – Happy Together Season 4; Shin Hyun-joon – Entertainment Weekly	Male
**Defconn** – **2 Days & 1 Night**; **Sam Hammington** – **The Return of Superman**; Kim Jong-min – 2 Days & 1 Night; Song Eun-i – Problem Child in House	**Kim Sook** – **Battle Trip**; **Moon Hee-joon** – **Immortal Songs: Singing the Legend**; Jun Hyun-moo – Happy Together Season 4; Shin Hyun-joon – Entertainment Weekly	**Kwon Jae-kwan** – **Pigeon Magic Troupe**, **YOLO Inn**; Kim Dae-hee – Bongsunga School, So Touching, We Need to Talk 1987; Kim Won-hyo – I'd Like to Ask a Favor, Refreshing Statements; Park Young-jin – Love Ladder, Say Anything Festival; Yoo Min-sang – The Everything Show, Love Ladder, Momentary Home Shopping
**Defconn** – **2 Days & 1 Night**; **Sam Hammington** – **The Return of Superman**; Kim Jong-min – 2 Days & 1 Night; Song Eun-i – Problem Child in House	**Kim Sook** – **Battle Trip**; **Moon Hee-joon** – **Immortal Songs: Singing the Legend**; Jun Hyun-moo – Happy Together Season 4; Shin Hyun-joon – Entertainment Weekly	Female
**Defconn** – **2 Days & 1 Night**; **Sam Hammington** – **The Return of Superman**; Kim Jong-min – 2 Days & 1 Night; Song Eun-i – Problem Child in House	**Kim Sook** – **Battle Trip**; **Moon Hee-joon** – **Immortal Songs: Singing the Legend**; Jun Hyun-moo – Happy Together Season 4; Shin Hyun-joon – Entertainment Weekly	**Shin Bong-sun** – **Ms. Shin**, **We Need to Talk 1987**; Kang Yoo-mi – Professional Stand-ins, Ugly Inside; Kim Min-kyung – Decline, Myeonghun, Myeonghun, Myeonghun; Oh Na-mi – Myeonghun, Myeonghun, Myeonghun, Ms. Shin
Excellence Award
Variety Category	Talk/Show Category	Comedy Category
**Kim Seung-hyun** – **Mr. House Husband**; **Ko Ji-yong** – **The Return of Superman**; Bong Tae-gyu – The Return of Superman; Jung Joon-young – 2 Days & 1 Night; Yoon Shi-yoon – 2 Days & 1 Night	**Jo Se-ho** – **Happy Together Season 4**; **Sung Si-kyung** – **Battle Trip**; Do Kyung-wan – I Like to Sing; Jeong Hyeong-don – Dancing High, Hyena on the Keyboard; Kim Tae-gyun – Hello Counselor	Male
**Kim Seung-hyun** – **Mr. House Husband**; **Ko Ji-yong** – **The Return of Superman**; Bong Tae-gyu – The Return of Superman; Jung Joon-young – 2 Days & 1 Night; Yoon Shi-yoon – 2 Days & 1 Night	**Jo Se-ho** – **Happy Together Season 4**; **Sung Si-kyung** – **Battle Trip**; Do Kyung-wan – I Like to Sing; Jeong Hyeong-don – Dancing High, Hyena on the Keyboard; Kim Tae-gyun – Hello Counselor	**Song Joon-geun** – **Bongsunga School**, **How Awkward**, **So Touching**; Kim Sung-won – Bongsunga School, The Participation Show; Ryu Geun-ji – The Everything Show, The Participation Show; Seo Tae-hoon – Love Ladder, Ms. Shin, The Participation Show; Song Young-gil – The Everything Show, The Participation Show, Sloppy Kung Fu, Ugly Inside
**Kim Seung-hyun** – **Mr. House Husband**; **Ko Ji-yong** – **The Return of Superman**; Bong Tae-gyu – The Return of Superman; Jung Joon-young – 2 Days & 1 Night; Yoon Shi-yoon – 2 Days & 1 Night	**Jo Se-ho** – **Happy Together Season 4**; **Sung Si-kyung** – **Battle Trip**; Do Kyung-wan – I Like to Sing; Jeong Hyeong-don – Dancing High, Hyena on the Keyboard; Kim Tae-gyun – Hello Counselor	Female
**Kim Seung-hyun** – **Mr. House Husband**; **Ko Ji-yong** – **The Return of Superman**; Bong Tae-gyu – The Return of Superman; Jung Joon-young – 2 Days & 1 Night; Yoon Shi-yoon – 2 Days & 1 Night	**Jo Se-ho** – **Happy Together Season 4**; **Sung Si-kyung** – **Battle Trip**; Do Kyung-wan – I Like to Sing; Jeong Hyeong-don – Dancing High, Hyena on the Keyboard; Kim Tae-gyun – Hello Counselor	**Park So-ra** – **How Awkward**, **Two Job Republic**; Kim Seung-hye – YOLO Inn; Lee Hyun-jeong – Call Center, Refreshing Statements; Lee Soo-ji – Bongsunga School, Child Romance
Rookie Award
Variety Category	Talk/Show Category	Comedy Category
**Lee Hanee** – **The Secret and Great Private Lives of Animals**; **Eric Nam** – **Grandma's Restaurant in Samcheong-dong**; Bae Jeong-nam – Where on Earth??, 1 Percent of Friendship; Choi Min-hwan – Mr. House Husband; JooE – Grandma's Restaurant in Samcheong-dong; Moon Ga-bi – Red Cheek You	**Choi Won-myeong** – **Music Bank**; **Kei** – **Music Bank**; Jo Hyun-ah – The Unit: Idol Rebooting Project; Lee Hye-sung – Entertainment Weekly	Male
**Lee Hanee** – **The Secret and Great Private Lives of Animals**; **Eric Nam** – **Grandma's Restaurant in Samcheong-dong**; Bae Jeong-nam – Where on Earth??, 1 Percent of Friendship; Choi Min-hwan – Mr. House Husband; JooE – Grandma's Restaurant in Samcheong-dong; Moon Ga-bi – Red Cheek You	**Choi Won-myeong** – **Music Bank**; **Kei** – **Music Bank**; Jo Hyun-ah – The Unit: Idol Rebooting Project; Lee Hye-sung – Entertainment Weekly	**Lee Seung-hwan** – **Bongsunga School**, **The Everything Show**; Bae Jeong-geun – Pigeon Magic Troupe; Lee Jae-yool – Bongsunga School; Park Jin-ho – Are You Human?, The Everything Show; Shim Moon-gyu – Child Romance, Pigeon Magic Troupe
**Lee Hanee** – **The Secret and Great Private Lives of Animals**; **Eric Nam** – **Grandma's Restaurant in Samcheong-dong**; Bae Jeong-nam – Where on Earth??, 1 Percent of Friendship; Choi Min-hwan – Mr. House Husband; JooE – Grandma's Restaurant in Samcheong-dong; Moon Ga-bi – Red Cheek You	**Choi Won-myeong** – **Music Bank**; **Kei** – **Music Bank**; Jo Hyun-ah – The Unit: Idol Rebooting Project; Lee Hye-sung – Entertainment Weekly	Female
**Lee Hanee** – **The Secret and Great Private Lives of Animals**; **Eric Nam** – **Grandma's Restaurant in Samcheong-dong**; Bae Jeong-nam – Where on Earth??, 1 Percent of Friendship; Choi Min-hwan – Mr. House Husband; JooE – Grandma's Restaurant in Samcheong-dong; Moon Ga-bi – Red Cheek You	**Choi Won-myeong** – **Music Bank**; **Kei** – **Music Bank**; Jo Hyun-ah – The Unit: Idol Rebooting Project; Lee Hye-sung – Entertainment Weekly	**Kim Ni-na** – **The Everything Show**, **The Girl That Used to be Pretty**; Choi Hee-ryung – Come On!, Group Assignment; Hwang Jeong-hye – Bongsunga School, Countryside Love, The Everything Show; Jang Ha-na – Bongsunga School, Let's Do This.
Other Awards
Best Entertainer Award	Staff of the Year Award	Best Idea Award
**Choi Yang-rak** and **Paeng Hyun-sook** – **Mr. House Husband**; **Kim Tae-jin** – **Entertainment Weekly**; **Yoon Shi-yoon** – **2 Days & 1 Night**	**Kim Young-seon** (photographing director)	**Gag Concert** – **Refreshing Statements**
Broadcasting Screenwriter Award	Best Teamwork Award	Popularity Award
**Jang Jong-won** – **Gag Concert**; **Screenwriter team** – **Hello Counselor**; **Shim Eun-ha** – **Mr. House Husband**	**Hello Counselor**	**The Return of Superman Children**
New DJ of the Year Award	Entertainment DJ of the Year Award	DJ of the Year Award
**Lee Su-hyun** – **Akdong Musician Suhyun's Volume Up**; **Yangpa** – **Yangpa's Music Garden**	**Jang Hang-jun** – **Jang Hang-jun and Kim Jin-soo's Mister Radio**; **Kim Jin-soo** – **Jang Hang-jun and Kim Jin-soo's Mister Radio**	**Park Eun-young**
Producers' Special Award	2018 Hot Issue Entertainer Award	2018 Hot Issue Variety Program
**Shin Hyun-joon** – **Entertainment Weekly**	**Bae Jeong-nam** – **Where on Earth??**, **1 Percent of Friendship**; **Bong Tae-gyu** – **The Return of Superman**; **Hwasa** and **Loco** – **Hyena on the Keyboard**; **Jung Chae-yeon** – **To. Jenny**	**Joy of Conversation**
Achievement Award	Best Couple Award	
**Bae Cheol-soo**	**Kim Eon-joong** and **Baek Ok-ja** – **Mr. House Husband**; **Kim Jun-ho** and **Kim Jong-min** – **2 Days & 1 Night**	

== Presenters ==
Order	Presenter(s)	Award	References
1	Yoo Jae-suk, Jo Yoon-hee	Rookie Award in Comedy Category	
2	Hwang Seok-jeong, Kim Ho-young	Rookie Award in Veriety Category; Rookie Award in Talk/Show Category	
3	Cha Tae-hyun	New DJ of the Year Award; Entertainment DJ of the Year Award; DJ of the Year Award	
4	Lee Hwi-jae, Park Eun-young	Broadcasting Screenwriter Award	
5	You Hee-yeol, JooE	Popularity Award; Achievement Award	
6	Andy, Eric Nam	2018 Hot Issue Entertainer Award; 2018 Hot Issue Variety Program	
7	Kim Sook, Hwasa	Producers' Special Award	
8	Lee Moo-song, Noh Sa-yeon	Best Couple Award	
9	Kim Hye-seon, Lee Soo-ji	Best Teamwork Award	
10	Bae Jeong-nam, Moon Ga-bi	Best Entertainer Award	
11	Shin Dong-yup	Staff of the Year Award	
12	Jun Hyun-moo, Son Na-eun	Excellence Award in Comedy Category	
13	Kim Jun-ho, Cha Tae-hyun	Excellence Award in Talk/Show Category; Excellence Award in Variety Category	
14	Sung Si-kyung, Jung Chae-yeon	Top Excellence Award in Comedy Category	
15	Lee Young-ja, Baekhyun	Top Excellence Award in Talk/Show Category; Top Excellence Award in Variety Category	
16	Lee Chang-hyun, Lee Si-young	Viewers' Choice Best Program Award	
17	Yang Seung-dong, Uee	Grand Prize (Daesang)	

== Special performances ==
Order	Artist	Song/Spectacle	References
1	Gag Concert team	"I Wanna Be a Celeb" (셀럽이 되고 싶어) (Original: Celeb Five)	
2	Grandma's Restaurant in Samcheong-dong team	"Ring Ring" (따르릉) (Original: Kim Young-chul & Hong Jin-young); Bboom Bboom (뿜뿜) (Original: Momoland)	
3	Gag Concert team	"Dope" (쩔어) + "Blood Sweat & Tears" (피 땀 눈물) + "Idol" (Original: BTS)	
4	Yoo Min-sang, Song Young-gil, Kim Soo-young	돼너	
5	Twice	"Yes or Yes"	
