= Grandma's Restaurant in Samcheong-dong =

South Korean television show

- Promotional poster
- Hangul: 삼청동 외할머니
- Lit.: Samcheong-dong Grandma
- RR: Samcheong-dong oehalmeoni
- MR: Samch'ŏng-dong oehalmŏni
- Genre: Cooking show Reality show
- Starring: Kim Young-chul; Eric Nam; JooE; Stella Jang; Andy
- Country of origin: South Korea
- Original language: Korean
- No. of seasons: 1
- No. of episodes: 12

Production
- Production location: South Korea
- Running time: 75 minutes

Original release
- Network: KBS2
- Release: November 24, 2018 – February 16, 2019

Grandma's Restaurant in Samcheong-dong (Korean: 삼청동 외할머니) is a South Korea reality show program on KBS 2 starring Kim Young-chul, Eric Nam, JooE (Momoland), Stella Jang and Andy (Shinhwa). The show airs on KBS 2 starting from November 24, 2018. It is distributed and syndicated by KBS every Saturday at 22:45 (KST). The program also airs on KBS World with English subtitles.

== Synopsis ==
This is a show which features 6 grandmas from 6 countries all over the world who come together to serve their traditional homemade meals in a pop-up restaurant located at Samcheong-dong, South Korea. The pop-up restaurant was opened for 2 weeks. In addition, this show also features 5 other artists who will be the employees of Grandma's restaurant to help the grandmas run the restaurant.

== Changes in Running Time ==
| Air Date | Air Time |
Every Saturday
| November 24 – December 29, 2018 | Part 1: 22:50 – 23:30 |
| November 24 – December 29, 2018 | Part 2: 23:30 – 00:05 |
| January 5 – February 16, 2019 | Part 1: 22:45 – 23:25 |
| January 5 – February 16, 2019 | Part 2: 22:25 – 00:00 |

== Casts (Employees) ==
| Name | Air Date | Episodes |
|---|---|---|
| Kim Young-chul | November 24, 2018 – February 16, 2019 | 1 – 12 |
| Eric Nam | November 24, 2018 – February 16, 2019 | 1 – 12 |
| JooE (Momoland) | November 24, 2018 – February 16, 2019 | 1 – 12 |
| Stella Jang | November 24, 2018 – February 16, 2019 | 1 – 12 |
| Andy (Shinhwa) | November 24, 2018 – February 16, 2019 | 1 – 12 |

== Foreign Grandmas (Cooks) ==
- Hungary - Anna
- Belgium - Veronica
- Costa Rica - Violeta
- Mexico - Odette
- Thailand - Nudaeng
- France - Laurence

== Ratings ==
- In the ratings below, the highest rating for the show will be in red, and the lowest rating for the show will be in blue each year.
- Ratings listed below are the individual corner ratings of Grandma's Restaurant in Samcheong-dong. (Note: Individual corner ratings do not include commercial time, which regular ratings include.)

=== Season 1 ===
List of episodes in 2018 – 2019 (episode 1 – 12)

| Ep. # | Original Airdate | Nielsen Ratings |
| Ep. # | Original Airdate | Nationwide |
|---|---|---|
| 1 | November 24, 2018 | 2.3% |
| 2 | December 1, 2018 | 2.0% |
| 2 | December 1, 2018 | 1.7% |
| 3 | December 8, 2018 | 2.3% |
| 3 | December 8, 2018 | 1.6% |
| 4 | December 15, 2018 | 1.5% |
| 4 | December 15, 2018 | 1.3% |
| 5 | December 29 | 1.0% |
| 6 | January 5, 2019 | 2.2% |
| 6 | January 5, 2019 | 1.2% |
| 7 | January 12, 2019 | 2.1% |
| 8 | January 19, 2019 | 1.8% |
| 9 | January 26, 2019 | 1.4% |
| 10 | February 2, 2019 | 1.8% |
| 10 | February 2, 2019 | 1.1% |
| 11 | February 9, 2019 | 2.1% |
| 12 | February 16, 2019 | 1.3% |
| 12 | February 16, 2019 | 1.0% |

== Awards and nominations ==
| Year | Award | Category | Recipients | Result | Ref. |
|---|---|---|---|---|---|
| 2018 | 16th KBS Entertainment Awards | Rookie Award (Variety Category) | Eric Nam | Won | |
| 2018 | 16th KBS Entertainment Awards | Rookie Award (Variety Category) | JooE (Momoland) | Nominated | |
