= Hello Counselor =

South Korean reality show

- Promotional poster
- Hangul: 안녕하세요
- Lit.: Hello
- RR: Annyeonghaseyo
- MR: Annyŏnghaseyo
- Genre: Variety, Talk show
- Presented by: Shin Dong-yup; Lee Young-ja; Kim Tae-gyun (Cultwo)
- Country of origin: South Korea
- Original language: Korean
- No. of episodes: 431

Production
- Executive producer: Kwon Yong-taek
- Running time: 80 minutes

Original release
- Network: KBS2
- Release: November 22, 2010 – September 30, 2019

Hello Counselor (Korean: 안녕하세요; RR: Annyeonghaseyo; lit. Hello) was a South Korean social commentary talk show that debuted on November 22, 2010. It was hosted by Shin Dong-yup, Lee Young-ja, and Cultwo (Jung Chan-woo, Kim Tae-gyun). Choi Tae-joon joined the show as host from August 29, 2016 to September 4, 2017. After 8 years as host, Jung Chan-woo has left the show after the broadcast of April 23, 2018 due to health problems.

According to the show's official description through KBS, Hello Counselor is a talk show with an emphasis on regular people, regardless of age or gender, that aims to help take down communication barriers by sharing stories about life. The program airs a new episode every Monday on KBS2, and re-airs it with English subtitles on KBS World a week later in the same time frame.

The final episode of the series aired on September 30, 2019.

== Episodes ==
=== 2010–2011 ===
List of episodes in 2010 – 2011 (episodes 1 – 55)

Episode	Air Date	Guests	Note(s)
1	November 22, 2010	Kim Jang-hoon, Psy	
2	November 29, 2010	You Hee-yeol, Lee Juck	
3	December 6, 2010	Shim Hyung-rae, IU	
4	December 20, 2010	Lee Soo-geun, Eun Ji-won	
5	December 27, 2010	KARA	
6	January 3, 2011	Kim Heung-gook	
7	January 10, 2011	Kim Tae-won (Boohwal)	
8	January 17, 2011	Kim Byung-man, Park Jisun	
9	January 24, 2011	Lee Man-gi, Joo Yeong-hoon	
10	January 31, 2011	Jo Hyung-ki, Kim Jisun	
11	February 7, 2011	Hong Seok-cheon, Hwang Seung-hwan, Baek Bo-ram	
12	February 14, 2011	Park Kyung-lim, Simon D (Supreme Team), Lee Hongki (F.T. Island), Min (miss A)	
13	February 21, 2011	Lee Sang-yong, Lee Sang-byeok	
Special	February 28, 2011	Insooni, Koyote (Shin Ji, Kim Jong-min)	"Treasure of My Life" Special
14	March 7, 2011	Park Sang-cheol, Ahn Sun Young, Hyomin (T-ara)	
15	March 14, 2011	Kang Ju-eun, Oh Jung-yeon	
16	March 21, 2011	Tony An, Kim Jae-duc	
17	March 28, 2011	Jeon Won-ju, Park Hyun-bin	
18	April 4, 2011	Sean Lee, Kim Yong-joon	
19	April 11, 2011	Nam Hee-suk, Go Young-wook	
20	April 18, 2011	Park Jung-ah, Han Sunhwa (Secret)	
21	April 25, 2011	Jo Hye-ryun, Kwanghee (ZE:A)	
22	May 2, 2011	Kim Jang-hoon, Hong Rok-ki, Kim Hyun-chul, Chae Yeon	
23	May 9, 2011	Yeon Ye-in, Ban Jeong-dan	
24	May 16, 2011	Park Jun-gyu, Kim Bo-min	
25	May 23, 2011	Song Eun-i, Shin Bong-sun	
26	May 30, 2011	Jang Woo-hyuk, Narsha (Brown Eyed Girls), Brian Joo (Fly to the Sky)	
27	June 6, 2011	After School (Kahi, Raina, Lizzy)	
28	June 13, 2011	Kim Jong-seo, Rainbow (Jaekyung, Woori)	
29	June 20, 2011	Park Ji-yoon, G.NA, 4Minute (Hyuna, Sohyun)	
30	June 27, 2011	2PM (Jun. K, Chansung, Taecyeon, Junho, Wooyoung)	
31	July 4, 2011	Kim Jun-ho, Kim Dae-hee	
32	July 11, 2011	Lee Yoon-mi, Chae Yeon, Eunjung (Jewelry)	
33	July 18, 2011	Alex (Clazziquai), MBLAQ (G.O, Lee Joon)	
34	July 25, 2011	Park Hyun-bin, Secret	
35	August 1, 2011	Yoo Se-yoon, Jang Dong-min, Yoo Sang-moo	
36	August 8, 2011	Tae Jin-ah, Mighty Mouth	
37	August 15, 2011	Lee Hyun-woo, Go Young-wook	
38	August 22, 2011	Koyote	
39	August 29, 2011	T-ara (Eunjung, Qri, Soyeon, Jiyeon)	
40	September 5, 2011	Park Jun-gyu, Hong Rok-ki, Lee Ji-hoon	
41	September 12, 2011	Super Junior (Shindong, Eunhyuk, Donghae, Kyuhyun)	
42	September 19, 2011	Sung Si-kyung, Moon Chun-sik, Kim Tae-hoon	
43	September 26, 2011	KARA	
44	October 3, 2011	Lee Bong-won, Song Eun-i, Kim Jun-ho	
45	October 10, 2011	K.Will, Kim Sung-joo, Yoo Hyun-sung	
46	October 17, 2011	Seo In-young, Girls' Generation (Sunny, Seohyun)	
47	October 24, 2011	Kim Gun-mo, Yoon Hyung-bin, Huh Gak	
48	October 31, 2011	Kim Yeon-woo, Go Young-wook, Yoon Il-sang	
49	November 7, 2011	Hong Jin-kyung, Yoo Young-suk, Jun Hyun-moo	
50	November 21, 2011	Park Jun-gyu, Kim Jang-hoon, Tak Jae-hoon, Minho (Shinee)	1 Year Anniversary Special
51	November 28, 2011	Kim Chang-ryeol, Moon Hee-joon, Jay Park	
52	December 5, 2011	Yang Hee-kyung, Son Hoyoung, Kim Sook	
53	December 12, 2011	Wonder Girls	
54	December 19, 2011	Kim Wan-sun, Sistar (Bora, Hyolyn)	
55	December 26, 2011	Lee Sang-woo, Kim Young-cheol, IU, Kim Saeng-min	

=== 2012 ===
List of episodes in 2012 (episodes 56 – 104)

Episode	Air Date	Guests	Note(s)
56	January 2, 2012	Boom, Jung Bum-kyun, Infinite (Sungkyu, Woohyun, Sungyeol)	
57	January 9, 2012	Baekdusan	
58	January 16, 2012	After School (Jungah, Lizzy), Brown Eyed Girls (Narsha, Miryo)	
59	January 23, 2012	Park Seong-ho, Jung Taeho, Choi Hyojong, Kim Won-hyo	
60	January 30, 2012	Yoon Do Hyun Band	
61	February 6, 2012	Kim Hyun-seok, Sung Si-kyung, Jang Jane	
62	February 13, 2012	Jaurim	
63	February 20, 2012	Boohwal	
64	February 27, 2012	Jay Park, ALi, Huh Gak, Shin Yong-jae (4MEN)	
65	March 5, 2012	Lee Sung-mi, Lee Kyung-sil, Jung Kyung-mi	
66	March 12, 2012	Kim Dae-hee, Kim Jun-ho, Hong In-kyu, Kim Ji-ho, Heo Min	
67	March 19, 2012	Yoon Jong-shin, Jo Jung-chi, Haha, Taw	
68	March 26, 2012	2AM	
69	April 2, 2012	CNBLUE (Lee Jung-shin, Jung Yong-hwa), John Park, K.Will	
70	April 9, 2012	Lee Hyun-woo, Kwon Woo-joong, Lee Joon (MBLAQ)	
71	April 16, 2012	Park Soo-hong, Park Kyung-lim, Brian Joo (Fly to the Sky)	
72	April 23, 2012	Shinee	
73	April 30, 2012	Shinhwa	
74	May 7, 2012	Sayuri Fujita, Shin Bora, Suzy (Miss A)	
75	May 14, 2012	Girls' Generation (Taeyeon, Tiffany, Seohyun)	
76	May 21, 2012	Lee Man-gi, Yang Joon-hyuk, Woo Ji-won, Kim Se-jin	
77	May 28, 2012	Baek Ji-young, Ailee, Ivy	
78	June 4, 2012	Seo In-guk, Huh Gak, Ulala Session	
79	June 11, 2012	Kim Jong-seo, Kim Kyung-ho, Choi Jaehoon	
80	June 18, 2012	After School (Uee, Raina, E-young), Jo Young-soo, 2BIC	
81	June 25, 2012	f(x)	
82	July 2, 2012	Jo Kwon (2AM), Sistar	
83	July 9, 2012	Wooyoung (2PM), T-ara (Eunjung, Hyomin, Areum)	
84	July 16, 2012	Ha Chun-hwa, Gong Hyung-jin, Kang Dong-ho	
85	July 23, 2012	Super Junior (Leeteuk, Sungmin, Eunhyuk, Ryeowook, Kyuhyun	
86	August 13, 2012	Kim Jun-ho, Park Seong-ho, Hong In-kyu, Jung Tae-ho	
87	August 20, 2012	Haha, Skull, Han Sunhwa (Secret)	
88	August 27, 2012	BEAST	
89	September 3, 2012	KARA (Gyuri, Seungyeon, Jiyoung)	
90	September 10, 2012	Kim Jun-hyun, Heo Kyung-hwan, Kim Ki-yeol, Yang Sang-guk	
91	September 17, 2012	ZE:A (Kwanghee, Dongjun, Siwan, Hyungsik)	
92	October 1, 2012	UV (Muzie & Yoo Se-yoon)	Chuseok Special
93	October 8, 2012	F.T. Island (Hongki, Lee Jae-jin), Secret (Sunhwa, Jieun)	
94	October 15, 2012	Boohwal	
95	October 22, 2012	TVXQ	
96	October 29, 2012	Son Dam-bi, Park Bo-young, Yooyoung (Hello Venus)	
97	November 5, 2012	Yoon Gun, K.Will, Lee Seok-hoon (SG Wannabe)	
98	November 12, 2012	Kim Jong-kook, Byul, Minah (Girl's Day)	
99	November 19, 2012	Kim Jung-min, Hong Jimin, Stephanie (The Grace)	
100	November 26, 2012	Super Junior (Shindong, Sungmin, Eunhyuk)	100th Episode Special
101	December 3, 2012	NS Yoon-G, Infinite (L, Sungkyu), Yewon (Jewelry)	
102	December 10, 2012	Lena Park, Kim Bum-soo	
103	December 17, 2012	Bobby Kim, Kim Tae-woo, Younha	
104	December 24, 2012	Hyun Young, Sung Si-kyung, Alex (Clazziquai)	

=== 2013 ===
List of episodes in 2013 (episodes 105 – 156)

Episode	Air Date	Guests	Note(s)
105	January 7, 2013	Hwang Sukyung, Han Suk-joon, Ga Aeran	
106	January 14, 2013	Girls' Generation (Hyoyeon, Yoona, Jessica, Taeyeon, Tiffany, Sunny)	
107	January 21, 2013	Kim Ji-min, Heo Kyung-hwan, Kim Young-hee	
108	January 28, 2013	CNBLUE	
109	February 4, 2013	4Minute (Jiyoon, Gayoon), Infinite (Dongwoo, Hoya)	
110	February 11, 2013	Raina (After School), Tae Jin-ah, Ailee	
111	February 18, 2013	Rainbow (Jaekyung, Woori), Sistar (Bora, Hyolyn)	
112	February 25, 2013	Son Hoyoung, Ivy, Park Hyun-bin, Huh Gak	
113	March 4, 2013	Shinee	
114	March 11, 2013	2AM	
115	March 18, 2013	Seo Kyung-seok, Kim Young-chul, Park Eunyoung	
116	March 25, 2013	Kim Woo-bin, Lee Soo-hyuk, Hyun Woo	
117	April 1, 2013	Park Seong-ho, Jung Tae-ho, Kim Junhyun, Yang Sang-guk	
118	April 8, 2013	Nancy Lang, Kim Na-young, Sayuri Fujita	
119	April 15, 2013	Yang Hee-eun, Song Eun-i, Kim Sook	
120	April 22, 2013	Davichi, ZE:A (Siwan, Hyungsik)	
121	April 29, 2013	Hong Jin-young, Kim Soo-mi, Jang Yun-jeong, Kang Jin	
122	May 6, 2013	Lee Soo-young, Secret (Hyoseong, Jieun), Son Sung-yoon	
123	May 13, 2013	Shinhwa	
124	May 20, 2013	Narsha (Brown Eyed Girls), Feeldog (Big Star), Roy Kim, Yoon Gun	
125	May 27, 2013	2PM	
126	June 3, 2013	Lee Hongki (F.T. Island), Im Won-hee, Baek Jin-hee, Shim Yi-young	
127	June 10, 2013	Lee Hyori, Spica (Jiwon, Boa)	
128	June 17, 2013	Ji Sang-ryeol, An Sunyoung, Kim Sae-rom, Kim Tae-hyun	
129	June 24, 2013	Sistar	
130	July 1, 2013	Joo Young-hoon, Lee Ki-chan, Seo In-young, Mina Fujii	
131	July 8, 2013	Super Junior (Eunhyuk, Ryeowook, Henry), EXO (Kris, Chanyeol, Suho)	
132	July 15, 2013	Jang Dong-min, Yoo Sang-moo, Tia (Chocolat), Heyne	
133	July 22, 2013	Rainbow (Jaekyung, Jisook), Infinite (Sungkyu, Woohyun)	
134	July 29, 2013	f(x), Jo Jung-chi	Summer Special 1
135	August 5, 2013	Lim Kim (Togeworl), ZE:A (Kwanghee, Dongjun, Siwan, Lee Hoo)	Summer Special 2
136	August 12, 2013	B1A4 (Sandeul, Jinyoung), Apink (Eunji, Chorong)	Summer Special 3
137	August 19, 2013	Koyote, Kangnam (M.I.B)	Summer Special 4
138	August 26, 2013	BEAST	
139	September 2, 2013	KARA	
140	September 9, 2013	Kim Bo-seong, Park Jung-yu, Wi Yang-ho, Park Gyu-seon	Tough Guys Special
141	September 16, 2013	Kim Ji-min, Shin Bora, Park Ji-sun, Kim Min-kyung	Funniest Women Special
142	September 23, 2013	Im Chang-jung, Jo Sung-mo, Kyungri (Nine Muses), Feeldog (Big Star)	
143	September 30, 2013	Heo Kyung-hwan, Yang Sang-guk, Yu Min-sang, Kwon Jae-kwan	
144	October 7, 2013	Teen Top (Niel, Chunji), Secret (Sunhwa, Jieun)	
145	October 14, 2013	K.Will, IU, EXO (Lay, Kai)	
146	October 21, 2013	2AM (Jo Kwon, Changmin, Seulong), Hong Soo-ah	
147	October 28, 2013	Shinee (Onew, Jonghyun, Minho), Kim Jun-hee, Min Hae-kyung	
148	November 4, 2013	Park Ji-yoon, MayBee, U-KISS (Soohyun, Kevin), Seo In-guk	
149	November 11, 2013	Miss A (Fei, Min), Huh Gak, Kim Jong-seo	
150	November 18, 2013	Kim Kiri, An So-mi, Noel (Kang Kyun-sung, Lee Sang-gon)	
151	November 25, 2013	Sung Si-kyung, Lee Jung-shin (CNBLUE), Suzy (Miss A)	3rd Anniversary Special
152	December 2, 2013	Hyolyn (Sistar), Insooni, Sonya, The One	
153	December 9, 2013	Bobby Kim, Park Wan-kyu, Lee Jung, ALi	
154	December 16, 2013	Kim Shin-young, Lee Bong-won, Kim Sook, Yeon Jihu	Love Special
155	December 23, 2013	T-ara (Eunjung, Boram), Lee Yun-seok, Yoon Hyung-bin	Love Special Part 2
156	December 30, 2013	Han Hye-jin, Lee Sun-jin, Hanyoung, Lee Hyuni	

=== 2014 ===
List of episodes in 2014 (episodes 157 – 205)

Episode	Air Date	Guests	Note(s)
157	January 6, 2014	Park Eun-young, Kim Seung-hwi, Kim Solhee, Jung Jiwon	
158	January 13, 2014	Park Jun-hyung, Lisa, Chung Dong-ha, Ailee	
159	January 20, 2014	TVXQ, Lee Yu-bi	
160	January 27, 2014	B1A4 (Baro, Jinyoung), Dal Shabet (Subin, Woohee)	
161	February 3, 2014	Girl's Day	
162	February 24, 2014	Gain (Brown Eyed Girls), Hyene, Kim In-kwon, Hong Kyungin	
163	March 3, 2014	Lee Min-woo (Shinhwa), Park Ji-yoon, Rainbow (Jaekyung, Hyunyoung)	
164	March 10, 2014	After School (Nana, Lizzy), Taeyeon (Girls' Generation), Jonghyun (Shinee)	
165	March 17, 2014	CNBLUE	
166	March 24, 2014	Dasom (Sistar), Im Chang-jung, Baek Sung-hyun, Jung Joo-yeon	
167	March 31, 2014	Toheart, Apink (Eunji, Namjoo)	
168	April 7, 2014	Lee Kyou-hyuk, Jo Haeri, Park Seung-hi, Kim Arang	Olympic Heroes Special
169	April 14, 2014	4Minute (Hyuna, Gayoon), MBLAQ (G.O, Mir)	
170	April 28, 2014	Kim Daeseong, Park Jisun, Oh Nami, Park Sung-kwang, Song Byeongcheol	
171	May 5, 2014	Hong Seok-cheon, Hong Kyung-min, Chun Yiseul, Haeryung (Bestie)	
172	May 12, 2014	Weesung, Fly to the Sky, NS Yoon-G	
173	May 19, 2014	Jun Hyoseong (Secret), G.NA, Park Hwi-soon, Kim Young-chul	
174	May 26, 2014	ZE:A (Kwanghee, Hyungsik, Dongjun, Minwoo)	
175	June 2, 2014	Infinite (Dongwoo, Sungkyu, Sungyeol)	
176	June 9, 2014	BEAST (Gikwang, Yoseob, Junhyung, Dongwoon)	
177	June 16, 2014	Gummy, Kim Hyo-jin, Gong Seo-young	
178	June 23, 2014	Baek Ji-young, Jiyeon (T-ara), Kim Yeon-woo, Tey (Mr.Mr)	
179	June 30, 2014	K.Will, Yang Sangguk, Jo Yunho, Hong Inkyu	
180	July 7, 2014	After School (Uee, Raina), San E	
181	July 14, 2014	Chu Soyeong, Yoo Taewoong, Jo Kyunghoon, Kim Seunghyun	
182	July 21, 2014	Sistar	
183	July 28, 2014	Hyuna, Homme (Lee Changmin, Lee Hyun)	Summer Special 1
184	August 4, 2014	Girl's Day (Sojin, Minah), B1A4 (Baro, Gongchan)	Summer Special 2 (Horror Special)
185	August 11, 2014	Hyunyoung, Kim Won-hyo, Mamamoo (Solar, Moonbyul)	
186	August 18, 2014	KARA, Taemin (Shinee))	
187	August 25, 2014	Secret (Hana, Sunhwa), Choi Seung-guk, Lee Joon-hyuk	
188	September 1, 2014	Kim Jong-min (Koyote), Red Velvet	
189	September 8, 2014	Shin Eun-kyung, Oh In-hye, Kang Ji-sub	
190	September 15, 2014	Super Junior (Heechul, Shindong, Kangin, Ryeowook)	
191	September 22, 2014	Ha Chun-hwa, 2PM (Jun. K, Taecyeon, Wooyoung)	
192	September 29, 2014	Kim Jong-seo, T-ara (Soyeon, Hyomin), Ailee	
193	October 6, 2014	Girls' Generation-TTS	
194	October 13, 2014	Roy Kim, Lee Guk-joo, Jang Do-yeon, Park Na-rae	
195	October 20, 2014	BEAST (Gikwang, Yoseob, Doojoon, Dongwoon)	
196	October 27, 2014	Younha, Park Eun-ji, Lee Byeong-jin, Mino	
197	November 3, 2014	Park So-hyun, Choi Hee, Gu Jiseong, Kim Hyun-chul	
198	November 10, 2014	Apink (Naeun, Bomi, Namjoo, Hayoung)	
199	November 17, 2014	Hong Rok-gi, Jeong Ga-eun, AOA (Choa, Seolhyun)	
200	November 24, 2014	Im Chang-jung, Eun Ji-won, Hwayobi, Shin Bora	200th Episode Special
201	December 1, 2014	Son Hoyoung (g.o.d), Kang Seong-jin, Kahi, Dongjun (ZE:A)	
202	December 8, 2014	Yang Hee-eun, Kim Bum-soo, Hong Jin-young, Ahn Yeong-mi	
203	December 15, 2014	Chae Yeon, Alex (Clazziquai), Tei, Eric Nam	
204	December 22, 2014	Kim Yeon-woo, Lee Se-jun, Kim Tae-woo, K.Will	
205	December 29, 2014	Joon Park (g.o.d), Kim Nayoung, Min Kyung-hoon (BUZZ), Nicole	

=== 2015 ===
List of episodes in 2015 (episodes 206 – 256)

Episode	Air Date	Guests	Note(s)	Winner		
Episode	Air Date	Guests	Note(s)	Story	Votes	Time(s)
206	January 5, 2015	Kim Dae-hee, Kim Ji-min, Heo Anna, Song Pil-geun		"Crazy Husband"	132	1st
207	January 12, 2015	EXID (Hani, Junghwa), BtoB (Minhyuk, Eunkwang)		"Sniff, Sniff"	135	1st
208	January 19, 2015	Noel (Kang Kyun-sung, Jeon Woo-sung), Jonghyun (SHINee), Gong Seo-young, NC.A		"Sniff, Sniff"	135	2nd
209	January 26, 2015	Park Sung-jin, Lee Hye-jung, Kim Jae-young, Song Hae-na		"Sniff, Sniff"	135	3rd
210	February 2, 2015	Jang Su-won (Sechs Kies), Jung Yong-hwa (CNBLUE), Lizzy (After School), Sun Woo		"Sniff, Sniff"	135	4th
211	February 9, 2015	4Minute (Hyuna, Gayoon), Ji Sang-ryeol, Seok Joo-il		"Go, Go, Please Go"	138	1st
212	February 16, 2015	Lee Joon-hyuk, Kyung Soo-jin, Lee Sang-yeob, Chae Soo-bin		"Go, Go, Please Go"	138	2nd
Special	February 20, 2015	Seollal Special – Family Counseling				
213	February 23, 2015	Park Sung-kwang, Park Young-jin, Kim Kiri, Kim Young-hee		"Go, Go, Please Go"	138	3rd
214	March 2, 2015	Shinhwa		"Go, Go, Please Go"	138	4th
215	March 9, 2015	Byun Jung-soo, Kim Sa-eun, Niel (Teen Top), Boyfriend (Donghyun, Jeongmin)		"Go, Go, Please Go"	138	5th
216	March 16, 2015	Kangnam (M.I.B), Minah (Girl's Day), Soya, Insoo (MYNAME)		"My Husband's Shopping Methods"	132	1st
217	March 23, 2015	Hyun Young, Heo Kyung-hwan, Yang Sang-gook, HEYNE		"My Husband's Shopping Methods"	132	2nd
218	March 30, 2015	Baek Ji-young, Gain (Brown Eyed Girls), Huh Gak, Song Yubin		"You're Too Much"	145	1st
219	April 6, 2015	Jang Dong-min, Lady Jane, Jo Se-ho, Nam Chang-hee		"You're Too Much"	145	2nd
220	April 13, 2015	EXO (Baekhyun, Chanyeol, Chen), Red Velvet (Joy, Yeri)		"Let's Talk"	153	1st
221	April 20, 2015	F.T. Island (Hongki, Choi Jong-hoon), Dal Shabet (Subin, Jiyul)		"Forget It?"	157	1st
222	April 27, 2015	Jo Kwon (2AM), Kim Sae-rom, Seo Yu-ri, Park Bo-ram		"Forget It?"	157	2nd
223	May 4, 2015	Kim Ga-yeon, Lim Yo-hwan, Jessi, BTS (Rap Monster, V)		"My Unpretty Daughter"	159	1st
224	May 11, 2015	Hong Jin-ho, Hyosung (Secret), Sungkyu (Infinite), Lim Kim (Togeworl)		"My Unpretty Daughter"	159	2nd
225	May 18, 2015	Jung Dong-ha, Solbi, SHINee (Jonghyun, Key, Taemin)		"My Unpretty Daughter"	159	3rd
226	May 25, 2015	Jinusean, Horan (Clazziquai), Eunjung (T-ara)		"Want to Shave"	162	1st
227	June 1, 2015	Shin Sung-woo, CNU (B1A4), Ken (VIXX)		"Help Me"	164	1st
228	June 8, 2015	Park Young-jin, Kim Kiri, Im Woo-il, Song Pil-geun	Fireman Special	"He'll Do Anything"	148	1st
229	June 15, 2015	Eun Ji-won, Seo In-young, KARA (Seungyeon, Hara)		"Help Me"	164	2nd
230	June 22, 2015	Sistar (Soyou, Bora, Hyolyn)	Chuseok Special	"Completely Out of the Blue"	166	4th
231	June 29, 2015	K.Will, Homme (Lee Hyun, Changmin), AOA (Choa, Mina)		"Husband Like Fire"	169	1st
232	July 6, 2015	Lee Ki-chan, Lee Ji-hye, Girl's Day (Sojin, Yura)		"Husband Like Fire"	169	2nd
233	July 13, 2015	Infinite (L, Sungyeol, Woohyun), Jang Jane		"Man Who Changes"	173	1st
234	July 20, 2015	Kim Won-jun, Bada, Hwang Chi-yeul, Melody Day (Yein, Chahee)		"Man Who Changes"	173	2nd
235	July 27, 2015	Apink (Eunji, Hayoung), Song Yeong-gil, Lee Sang-hoon		"Man Who Changes"	173	3rd
236	August 3, 2015	Simon D, Jay Park, Cheetah, Lee Hoon, Kim Hyun-jung		"Man Who Changes"	173	4th
237	August 10, 2015	B1A4 (Jinyoung, Sandeul, Gongchan), Gong Seung-yeon		"My Husband is a Phoenix"	175	1st
238	August 17, 2015	Lee Guk-joo, Kang Ye-bin, Kim Sook, Park Gi-ryang		"My Husband is a Phoenix"	175	2nd
239	August 24, 2015	Jung-in, Jo Jung-chi, T-ara (Soyeon, Hyomin)		"My Husband is a Phoenix"	175	3rd
240	August 31, 2015	Jang Do-yeon, Teen Top (C.A.P, Chunji, Niel, Ricky, Changjo)	Outdoor Call Center Counselling Special	"What Planet Are You From?"	104	1st
241	September 7, 2015	Lee Eun-gyeol, Chorong (Apink), SG Wannabe (Lee Seok-hoon, Kim Yong-jun)		"My Husband is a Phoenix"	175	4th
242	September 14, 2015	Jun Jin (Shinhwa), Hong Ji-min, Baek A-yeon, Jooheon (Monsta X)		"My Husband is a Phoenix"	175	5th
243	September 21, 2015	Sayuri Fujita, DinDin, Kim Hyo-jin, Bae Ki-sung (CAN)		"Do You Live Alone?"	147	1st
244	October 5, 2015	Kim Young-ho, Changmin (2AM), Kim Jung-mo (TRAX), Lyn, Shin Ji-ho		"Hate Love"	149	1st
245	October 12, 2015	Hong Seok-cheon, Lee Ji-hyun, Lovelyz (Kei, Yein)		"Mom, Please!"	150	1st
246	October 19, 2015	Kim Na-young, Kim Young-hee, Bae Jeong-nam, Lee Young-jin		"Mom, Please!"	150	2nd
247	October 26, 2015	Kyuhyun (Super Junior), Stephanie (The Grace), Muzie (UV), Purfles (Geonhee, Eunyong)		"Mom, Please!"	150	3rd
248	November 2, 2015	Park Jun-gyu, Lee Kye-in, Kim Dong-wan (Shinhwa), Sleepy (Untouchable)		"Stop Her"	151	1st
249	November 9, 2015	Brown Eyed Girls		"Want to Stop Now"	155	1st
250	November 16, 2015	EXID (Hani, LE, Hyerin), Dynamic Duo		"Want to Stop Now"	155	2nd
251	November 23, 2015	Park Ji-yoon, Lee Hyun-woo, Kim Jung-min	5th Anniversary Special	"Man Who Only Cares For Me"	141	1st
252	November 30, 2015	Lee Hong-gi (F.T. Island), Noel (Kang Kyun-sung, Lee Sang-gon), Mir (MBLAQ)		"A Wife's Scream"	157	1st
253	December 7, 2015	Jung Sung-ho, Nine Muses (Kyungri, Euaerin), Oh Hyun-min		"Unbelievable"	160	1st
254	December 14, 2015	Jieun (Secret), Roy Kim, Laboum (Solbin, Yulhee)	Cameo GFriend	"Touching Everyday"	164	1st
255	December 21, 2015	Kim Sang-hyuk (Click-B), Kim Beom-soo, Kim Joo-hee, Ryu Si-hyeon		"Touching Everyday"	164	2nd
256	December 28, 2015	Lee Sang-hoon, Eric Nam, Kim Ji-min, Hayoung (Apink)	Christmas Special			

=== 2016 ===
List of episodes in 2016 (episodes 257 – 305)

Episode	Air Date	Guests	Note(s)	Winner		
Episode	Air Date	Guests	Note(s)	Story	Votes	Time(s)
257	January 4, 2016	Lee Hyun-woo, Seo Ye-ji, Kan Mi-youn, Hongbin (VIXX), Jeong Yoo-jin		"Man Who Doesn't Budge"	167	1st
258	January 11, 2016	Yesung (Super Junior), Dal Shabet (Subin, Ah Young), Park Si-hwan		"Man Who Doesn't Budge"	167	2nd
259	January 18, 2016	Niel (Teen Top), Yezi (Fiestar), Yoon Jung-soo, Lee Soo-ji		"My Husband's Dangerous Private Life"	169	1st
260	January 25, 2016	Park Gwang-hyun, Kwon So-hyun (4Minute), Kim Hye-seong, Kim Kyung-rok (V.O.S)		"Lifetime Enemy"	170	1st
261	February 1, 2016	Shin Hye-sung (Shinhwa), K.Will, Heo Young-ji (KARA), Kim Ryeowook (Super Junior)		"Lifetime Enemy"	170	2nd
Special	February 8, 2016	Seol Special: How Are You These Days?				
262	February 15, 2016	Kim Jong-seo, Jo Kwon (2AM), AOA Cream (Hyejeong, Chanmi)		"Lifetime Enemy"	170	3rd
263	February 22, 2016	Jung Joon-young, Crush, GFriend (Yuju, SinB)		"Stop! Stop! Stop!"	172	1st
264	February 29, 2016	Park Jung-chul, Kang Sung-jin, Seomoon Tak, Kim Il-joong		"Nobody Is Like This"	173	1st
265	March 7, 2016	Rainbow (Jisook, Woori), B.A.P (Himchan, Daehyun)		"How That Man Loves"	174	1st
266	March 14, 2016	Kim Jo-han, Yoo Sang-moo, Kim Joon-hee, Cheetah		"Addicted To Love"	176	1st
267	March 21, 2016	Jo Woo-jong, Hong Jin-ho, Red Velvet (Irene, Wendy)		"Addicted To Love"	176	2nd
268	March 28, 2016	Baek Sung-hyun, Lee Hyun, Oh My Girl (Hyojung, YooA)	Cameo Heechul (Super Junior)	"Addicted To Love"	176	3rd
269	April 4, 2016	Park So-hyun, Kang Ye-won, Lee Se-young, Dayoung (Cosmic Girls)		"Addicted To Love"	176	4th
270	April 11, 2016	Han Go-eun, Kim Sung-kyung, Jung Yong-hwa (CNBLUE), Kwanghee (ZE:A)		"Find My Husband"	179	1st
271	April 18, 2016	Kim Kyung-sik, Jung Kyung-mi, Fiestar (Cao Lu, Hyemi), Park Bo-ram		"Find My Husband"	179	2nd
272	April 25, 2016	Oh Young-shil, Hong Jin-kyung, Tei, Jung Eun-ji (Apink)		"Find My Husband"	179	3rd
273	May 2, 2016	Jo Gap-kyung, Yang Jae-jin, Kim Sae-rom, Lee Se-jin		"Let's End It"	181	1st
274	May 9, 2016	Hong Seok-cheon, Pyo Jin-in, Wax, DinDin		"Let's End It"	181	2nd
275	May 16, 2016	Yoon Bok-in, Hyun Young, Andy Lee (Shinhwa), Jeong Jinwoon (2AM), Wooshin (UP10TION)		"Let's End It"	181	3rd
276	May 23, 2016	Lee Sang-min, Sung Dae-hyun, Park Sang-hee, Chung Dong-ha		"Let's End It"	181	4th
277	May 30, 2016	Im Jung-eun, Defconn, Nam Woo-hyun (Infinite), Jo Jeong-min		"Let's End It"	181	5th
278	June 6, 2016	Son Hoyoung (G.o.d), Moon Ji-ae, I.O.I (Zhou Jieqiong, Choi Yoo-jung), Jung Woo-yeol		"Pay Attention To Me"	152	1st
279	June 13, 2016	Lee Jeong-min, Luna (F(x)), Baek A-yeon, HEYNE		"Change My Husband"	154	1st
280	June 20, 2016	Yoon Yoo-sun, Dana (The Grace), Joo Woo-jae, Lee Jin-yi		"Change My Husband"	154	2nd
281	June 27, 2016	Lee Hyun-woo, Jang Youngran, Raina (After School), San E		"Change My Husband"	154	3rd
282	July 4, 2016	Ra Mi-ran, Park Gwang-seon, Lee Yi-kyung, Kwon Hyuk-soo		"Are You Reading That Again?"	157	1st
283	July 11, 2016	Pyo Jin-in, Sistar (Bora, Dasom), Ahn Woo-yeon		"Are You Reading That Again?"	157	2nd
284	July 18, 2016	Lee Hye-jung, Sung Dae-hyun (R.ef), Moon Se-yoon, Gong Myung		"Dad, Please"	158	1st
285	July 25, 2016	Song Eun-i, KNK (Seungjun, Inseong), Jung Woo-yeol		"Dad, Please"	158	2nd
286	August 1, 2016	Baek Ji-young, Choi Tae-joon, Song Jae-hee, Kim So-hee (C.I.V.A)		"Dad, Please"	158	3rd
287	August 22, 2016	Choi Tae-joon, Lim Ju-hwan, Hong Jin-young		"I'm Not Your Mother"	160	1st
288	August 29, 2016	Lee Hyun-yi, Lee Hye-jeong, Jin Ah-reum	Choi Taejoon's first episode as host	"My Gluttonous Woman"	162	1st
289	September 5, 2016	Jun. K (2PM), Choi Hee		"An Annoying Customer"	163	1st
290	September 12, 2016	Jeon Yoo-sung, Oh Na-mi		"I Want My Husband Back"	166	1st
291	September 19, 2016	Kim So-hyun, Son Jun-ho		"Why Are You With Me?"	168	1st
292	September 26, 2016	Hwang Jung-min, Clazziquai (Alex Chu, Horan)		"Why Are You With Me?"	168	2nd
293	October 3, 2016	Apink (Chorong, Namjoo), Mamamoo (Wheein, Moonbyul)		"Is This What Life's Like?"	170	1st
294	October 10, 2016	Park Sung-kwang, Hong Yoon-hwa		"Is This What Life's Like?"	170	2nd
295	October 17, 2016	Lee Soo-min (C.I.V.A), Yang Jae-jin		"Is This What Life's Like?"	170	3rd
296	October 24, 2016	Kim Sung-kyung, Twice (Nayeon, Sana)		"I Want To Smell It Too"	131	1st
297	October 31, 2016	Seo Yoo-jeong, VIXX (Ken, Hongbin)		"My Exhausting Life"	150	1st
298	November 7, 2016	Lee Jeong-min, Kim Min-kyo, B.A.P (Himchan, Youngjae)		"Can I Block My Son?"	141	1st
299	November 14, 2016	Jang Do-yeon, Kang Tae-oh, Cha Eunwoo (ASTRO)		"The Watcher"	140	1st
300	November 21, 2016	Lee Sang-woo, Shim Hyung-tak, Seo In-young, Jeon So-mi (I.O.I)	300th Episode Special			
301	November 28, 2016	Joon Park (g.o.d), Lee Ji-hye, UP10TION (Kuhn, Wei)		"Do I Have to Take it Off?"	145	1st
302	December 5, 2016	Moon Hee-kyung, SEVENTEEN (Jeonghan, Seungkwan)		"No, No"	142	1st
303	December 12, 2016	Kim Young-ok, B1A4 (Jinyoung, Baro)		"Am I Creepy?"	147	1st
304	December 19, 2016	Park Sang-min, Apink (Eunji, Naeun), Choi Byung-chan (Victon)		"Dangerous Obsession"	135	1st
305	December 26, 2016	Ahn Seon-young, Kim Jeong-hoon (UN), Hwang Chi-yeul		"Reasons for Not Talking"	152	1st

=== 2017 ===
List of episodes in 2017 (episodes 306 – 347)

Episode	Air Date	Guests	Note(s)	Winner	
Episode	Air Date	Guests	Note(s)	Story	Votes
306	January 2, 2017	Shin So-yul, Zhang Yu'an		"Toilet Prince"	152
307	January 9, 2017	Shin A-young, AOA (Choa, Hyejeong)		"My Dangerous Mother"	130
308	January 16, 2017	Jeong Ga-eun, Cosmic Girls (Cheng Xiao, Bona)		"Shall I Get Divorced?"	174
309	January 23, 2017	Hwang Dong-joo, Jo Choong-hyun, Lee Soo-ji		"The King's Woman"	159
310	January 30, 2017	Kangnam, Cao Lu (Fiestar), Robin Deiana, Benji (B.I.G)		"My Scary Wife"	125
311	February 6, 2017	Hong Hye-geol, Yeo Esther		"Daughter, Please Stop"	139
312	February 13, 2017	Hong Jin-young, MC Gree	Minos (Eluphant) and Hanhae appeared during third concern	"The Job Hopper"	157
313	February 20, 2017	Park Hae-mi, Jo Hye-ryun, Michelle Lee		"My Excruciating Love"	146
314	February 27, 2017	Kim Soo-yong, Lee Hyun-kyung, Kyungri (Nine Muses)		"It's Really Over"	140
315	March 6, 2017	Shindong (Super Junior), Lovelyz (Mijoo, Sujeong)		"I'm Frustrated to Death!"	158
316	March 13, 2017	Kim Seung-hye, BTS (Jin, Jimin)		"He Drives Me Crazy"	154
317	March 20, 2017	Zizo, GFriend (SinB, Umji)		Let Go of Your Dream	125
318	March 27, 2017	Girl's Day		"Where's My House?"	144
319	April 3, 2017	Park Dool-seon, PRISTIN (Kyulkyung, Xiyeon)		"I Beg You"	139
320	April 10, 2017	Hwang Chi-yeul, Oh My Girl (Hyojung, Jiho)			
321	April 17, 2017	Kim Min-jun, Minzy, Laboum (Solbin, ZN)		The Risky Man	157
322	April 24, 2017	Rose Motel (Yook Joong-wan, Kang Joon-woo), Park Min-ji			
323	May 1, 2017	Kim Seung-hyun, Lee Chun-soo, DIA (Huihyeon, Chaeyeon)		The Difficult Man	145
324	May 8, 2017	Eli (U-KISS), EXID (Hani, Hyelin)		The Silent Son	171
325	May 15, 2017	Lee Ji-hoon, Lee Jin-ho, CNU (B1A4)		Please, Son	158
326	May 22, 2017	Gummy, Roy Kim, Oh Hyun-min		Extreme Life	168
327	May 29, 2017	Mamamoo		"Smoke-stained Life"	171
328	June 5, 2017	Boom, Twice (Jeongyeon, Dahyun)		"Are You Sleeping?"	130
329	June 12, 2017	Kim Jung-hwa, F.T. Island (Lee Hong-gi, Choi Min-hwan), Han Dong-geun		"My Goodness"	160
330	June 19, 2017	Heo Kyung-hwan, Apink (Jung Eun-ji, Yoon Bo-mi), Parc Jae-jung		"Biased Love"	155
331	June 26, 2017	Kim Hye-eun, Choi Hyun-woo		"Are You In Your Right Mind"	158
332	July 3, 2017	Kim Tae-woo (g.o.d), Kim Jeong-min, Henry Lau		"Nothing At Home"	155
333	July 10, 2017	Kim Eung-soo, Kim Min-kyung, ASTRO (Cha Eunwoo, Moon Bin)		"My Husband Is Addicted"	153
334	July 17, 2017	Yang Se-hyung, Jung Yong-hwa (CNBLUE), Red Velvet (Wendy, Joy)		"Tyrant Mother"	157
335	July 24, 2017	Ahn Ji-hwan, Sam Hammington, Ailee		"What are you doing? Where are you?"	153
336	July 31, 2017	Min Kyung-hoon (BUZZ), Weki Meki (Yoojung, Doyeon)		"Dangerous Friendship"	160
337	August 7, 2017	Son Hoyoung (g.o.d), GFriend (Eunha, Umji), Jang Moon-bok		"Please Say Goodbye"	159
338	August 14, 2017	Park Mi-sun, Kim Jong-min (Koyote), Jiyeon (T-ara), Peter Han		"Why Did You Get Married?"	165
339	August 21, 2017	Gong Hyung-jin, Jung Sang-hoon, DIA (Jueun, Chaeyeon)		"Where Is His Home"	166
340	August 28, 2017	Ivy, Min Woo-hyuk, Soyou, Lee Eui-woong	Choi Tae-joon hasn't appeared in this episode	"A Passionate Man"	150
341	September 4, 2017	Wanna One (Kang Daniel, Park Ji-hoon, Hwang Min-hyun)	Choi Tae-joon's last episode	"Please Quit Now"	170
342	September 11, 2017	Hong Kyung-min, Sleepy (Untouchable), Gikwang (HIGHLIGHT), Kim Ji-sook		"Shady Partner"	158
343	October 2, 2017	Kim Soo-yong, Turbo (Kim Jung-nam, Mikey), Lee Tae-im	Chuseok Special	"Revealing Herself"	147
344	October 9, 2017	K.Will, Kangnam, Kang Tae-oh (5urprise), Hur Youngji		"I'm Not Your Meal Ticket"	166
345	October 16, 2017	B1A4 (Sandeul, Gongchan), Kim Min-gyu, Sejeong (Gugudan), Seol In-ah		"Is This A True Story?"	167
346	October 23, 2017	Oh Ji-ho, Park Seul-gi, Do Ji-han, Seol In-ah		"A Wife Who Is Still Legally Single"	156
347	November 6, 2017	Kim So-hyun, Son Jun-ho, EXO (Suho, Sehun)		"Spine Breaker"	166

=== 2018 ===
List of episodes in 2018 (episodes 348 – 394)

Episode	Air Date	Guests	Note(s)	Winner	
Episode	Air Date	Guests	Note(s)	Story	Votes
348	January 15, 2018	Joon Park (g.o.d), Kim Il-joong, DinDin, Kim Chung-ha		"Brother, Stupid!"	151
349	January 22, 2018	Super Junior (Yesung, Shindong, Eunhyuk, Donghae)		"Never a Peaceful Day"	151
350	January 29, 2018	Brown Eyed Girls (JeA, Narsha), Block B (Taeil, Jaehyo, Park Kyung)		"Tough Middle-Aged Life"	159
351	February 5, 2018	Baek Ji-young, Davichi, INFINITE (Dongwoo, Woohyun, Sungjong)		"Are You Even Alive?"	161
352	February 12, 2018	Hong Seok-cheon, Wax, Hong Jin-young, Gugudan (Hana, Mina)		"A Man Who Works at Night"	150
353	February 19, 2018	KCM, Wang Ji-won, Red Velvet (Irene, Seulgi)		"My Man's Man"	141
354	February 26, 2018	Han Young, Kim Sae-rom, DinDin, Weki Meki (Doyeon, Sei)		"Buried in Debt"	150
355	March 5, 2018	Jung Jae-yong (DJ DOC), Mamamoo		"Out-of-hand Love"	154
356	March 12, 2018	Kim Seung-hyun, Choi Je-woo, Cosmic Girls (Bona, Cheng Xiao, Yeonjung)		"Mom, Where Are You Going?"	147
357	March 19, 2018	Lee Sang-min, Wanna One (Hwang Min-hyun, Ong Seong-wu, Kim Jae-hwan)		"My Man's Cave"	163
358	March 26, 2018	NCT 127 (Doyoung, Jaehyun, Mark), Momoland (Yeonwoo, JooE, Nancy)		"Doomed Man"	152
359	April 2, 2018	Tony An (H.O.T.), San E, EXID (Hani, Jeonghwa), Jung Seung-hwan, Han Hyun-min		"Complicated Girl Problems"	138
360	April 9, 2018	Lee Ji-ae, Lee Min-woong, Twice (Jeongyeon, Sana, Tzuyu)		"Don't Stop Me!"	148
361	April 16, 2018	Jo Sung-mo, Kim Ji-min, Flowsik, Eric Nam, Killagramz		"My Husband's Strange Desire"	147
362	April 23, 2018	Kim Kwang-kyu, Hwang Chi-yeul, Jo Hyun-ah (Urban Zakapa), UNB (Euijin, Feeldog)	Jung Chan-woo's last episode	"Sad Confession"	162
363	April 30, 2018	Kim Kyung-ho, Yoon Hyung-bin, Jung Kyung-mi, GFriend (Yuju, SinB)		"Shall We Graduate from Our Marriage?"	161
364	May 7, 2018	Woo Hyun, Choi Jung-won, Kim Yeon-koung, Niel (Teen Top)		"Last Warning"	158
365	May 14, 2018	Jeong Ga-eun, Gilgu Bonggu, SEVENTEEN (Hoshi, Seungkwan)		"Mom's Wish"	148
366	May 21, 2018	Lee Hwi-jae, Hong Kyung-min, Oh My Girl (YooA, Jiho), Yoo Hwe-seung (N.Flying)		"Deep Love"	162
367	May 28, 2018	Kim Young-chul, Choi Jung-in, Park Ji-seon, WJMK (Seola, Yoojung)		"Is He Really Their Father?"	166
368	June 4, 2018	Ji Sang-ryeol, Park Ji-woo, Kim So-young, AOA (Mina, Seolhyun)		"Honey, No More!"	153
369	June 11, 2018	Han Hye-yeon, Yubin, Sam Okyere, BtoB (Peniel, Ilhoon)		"Her New Hobby"	164
370	June 25, 2018	Won Ki-joon, Chae Yeon, Kyungri (Nine Muses), The East Light (Sagang, Woojin)		"God-Like Man"	163
371	July 9, 2018	Kim Eana, Kim Dong-hyun, Hangzoo, Apink (Yoon Bo-mi, Son Na-eun)		"Tired Because of My Face"	146
372	July 16, 2018	Yang Dong-geun, Kim Bo-min, Park Sung-kwang, Lee Hyun-joo, Alberto Mondi		"A Man Who Asks for Hardship"	161
373	July 23, 2018	Tak Jae-hoon, Lee Ji-hye, Lee Gyu-bok, Gugudan (Nayoung, Sejeong)		"Relieve My Grudge!"	152
374	July 30, 2018	Kim Ji-seon, Shin Ji (Koyote), Heo Yang-im, Lee Hong-gi (F.T. Island), Rowoon (SF9)		"Who Am I Living For?"	161
375	August 6, 2018	Song Kyung-ah, Hwangbo, Julien Kang, DIA (Chaeyeon, Somyi)		"Son, Please..."	144
376	August 13, 2018	Hong Ji-min, Sayuri Fujita, Go Young-bae (Soran), Laboum (ZN, Solbin)		"Stranger Couple"	157
377	August 20, 2018	Choi Hyun-seok, Kim Min-ki, Hong Yoon-hwa, Chansung (2PM), Nayoung (Pristin)		"This is My Daughter"	143
378	August 27, 2018	Kang Joo-eun, Kim Jong-min (Koyote), Byul, Lee Sang-joon, Song So-hee		"A Life-risking Concern"	159
379	September 3, 2018	Kahi, Heo Kyung-hwan, Kang Hyung-wook, Chungha, Kim So-hye		"A Lonely Battle"	156
380	September 10, 2018	Yoo Min-sang, Shim Jin-hwa, Sunmi, NU'EST W (JR, Ren)		"Please Stop"	166
381	September 17, 2018	Moon Se-yoon, Kim Sung-eun, Cheetah, Got7 (JB, Jinyoung)		"Don't Get Divorced"	157
382	October 1, 2018	Baek Bong-ki, Oh Na-mi, Cheon Yi-seul, Cosmic Girls (Bona, Luda)		"Bachelor Husband"	143
383	October 8, 2018	Lee Ki-chan, Great Library, Kim Min-kyung, Nature (Lu, Gaga)	Special appearance by Kangnam	"An Unfaithful Husband"	167
384	October 15, 2018	Tiger JK, Kwon Hyuk-soo, Risabae, Weki Meki (Elly, Doyeon)		"A Stinky Man"	160
385	October 22, 2018	Park Ki-young, Kim Na-young, Kim Ho-young, Monsta X (Kihyun, Shownu)		"Don't Even Dream!"	164
386	October 29, 2018	Byun Gi-soo, Daniel Lindemann, Jung Eun-ji (Apink), Iz One (Choi Ye-na, Jang Won-young)		"That Darn Love"	160
387	November 5, 2018	Kim Il-joong, Kim Hwan, DIA (Yebin, Somyi), Kenta (JBJ95)		"Looking for My Real Mom"	159
388	November 12, 2018	Park Joon-hyung, Kim Ji-hye, Hanhae, Twice (Jihyo, Mina)		"Uncomfortable Living Situation"	169
389	November 19, 2018	Johan Kim, Red Velvet (Seulgi, Joy), Faker, Seo Do-hyun		"A Man from Joseon"	167
390	November 26, 2018	Lee Man-gi, Kang Sung-tae, Key (Shinee), EXID (Solji, Jeonghwa)		"My Husband's Two Households"	150
391	December 3, 2018	Shin Yi, Ben, Jin Hae-sung, Lovelyz (Mijoo, Kei)		"Will I Ever Get Married?"	161
392	December 10, 2018	Norazo, Giriboy, Seol In-ah, Lee Hye-sung		"Dreamer Boy"	141
393	December 17, 2018	Yoon Sung-ho, Dong Hyun-bae, Seo In-young, Shorry J (Mighty Mouth), Luna (f(x))		"Come Back."	138
394	December 24, 2018	Park Ji-seon, Austin Kang, Choi Tae-joon, Chungha, Haon			

=== 2019 ===
List of episodes in 2019 (episodes 395 – 431)

Episode	Air Date	Guests	Note(s)	Winner	
Episode	Air Date	Guests	Note(s)	Story	Votes
395	January 7, 2019	Kim Jun-hyun, Park Young-jin, Lee Soo-ji, Pentagon (Hui, Hongseok)		"Truth About My Husband"	170
396	January 14, 2019	Choi Jung-won, Yewon, GFriend (Yuju, Umji), Han Tae-woong		"My Long-lost Life"	175
397	January 21, 2019	Shin Bong-sun, Hwang Chi-yeul, Shin A-young, DinDin		"Please Stop My Wife."	166
398	January 28, 2019	Chae Yeon, Kang Ah-rang, The Boyz (Sangyeon, Younghoon)		"Hey, You Prick."	170
399	February 4, 2019	Jeon Mi-ra, Choi Hyun-woo, Ahn Young-mi, Monsta X (Minhyuk, Jooheon)		"Looking for My Children's Father."	162
400	February 11, 2019	Lee Seung-yoon, Jo Seung-yeon, Lee Hyun-yi, Lee Hye-jeong, Eric Nam	400th Episode Special	"Give It Up"	170
401	February 18, 2019	Park Ji-yoon, Bae Yoon-jeong, Hyomin (T-ara), SF9 (Rowoon, Chani)		"My Wish"	167
402	February 25, 2019	Hyun Young, Seo Yu-ri, Cho Jun-ho, Ha Sung-woon (Hotshot), Im Hyun-joo		"Life Coordinator"	150
403	March 4, 2019	Kim Soo-yong, Hong Jin-young, Ravi (VIXX), (G)I-dle (Minnie, Yuqi)		"Please Go Out"	153
404	March 11, 2019	Koyote, Dream Note (Lara, Sumin)		"Please Stop His Addiction"	168
405	March 18, 2019	Noh Sa-yeon, Block B (B-Bomb, P.O), Momoland (Hyebin, JooE)		"Bottle Cap Concern"	169
406	March 25, 2019	Boom, Lee Sa-gang, Ron, DIA (Yebin, Chaeyeon)		"Two-faced Husband"	145
407	April 1, 2019	Jeon No-min, Giant Pink, Haon, Iz One (Kwon Eun-bi, Kim Min-ju)		"A Kicking Concern"	161
408	April 8, 2019	Yoon Jung-soo, Nam Chang-hee, Park Eun-young, Kim Dong-han, Park Gi-roo		"Every Single Night"	170
409	April 15, 2019	Oh Jeong-yeon, Lee Seok-hoon (SG Wannabe), Kwanghee (ZE:A), April (Naeun, Jinsol)		"The Quitter"	166
410	April 22, 2019	Narsha (Brown Eyed Girls), Yoo Jae-hwan, Choi Jeong-hoon (Jannabi), N.Flying (Kim Jae-hyun, Yoo Hwe-seung)		"Will I Ever Be Happy?"	167
411	April 29, 2019	Jung Da-eun, Lee Yong-jin, NU'EST (Aron, Minhyun), Angelina Danilova		"When Will Hello Counselor End?"	162
412	May 6, 2019	Ham So-won, Cheetah, NC.A, Golden Child (Y, Bomin)		"Short Fuse"	155
413	May 13, 2019	Byun Jung-soo, Oh Sang-jin, Kim Ji-min, Fromis 9 (Lee Sae-rom, Jang Gyu-ri)		"Let's Hit the Brakes"	169
414	May 20, 2019	Sam Hammington, Jang Youngran, Got7 (BamBam, Yugyeom), Kim Jae-hwan		"Extreme Parent Pleasing!"	167
415	May 27, 2019	Kim Hyun-chul, Hong Hyun-hee, Stephanie, AB6IX (Lim Young-min, Lee Dae-hwi)		"Let's Stop This"	170
416	June 3, 2019	Kwak Jeong-eun, Kangnam, Cosmic Girls (Seola, Bona), Jonathan Thona		"Good-for-Nothing Old Man"	158
417	June 10, 2019	Kim Ji-young, Han Suk-joon, Song Hae-na, Sandeul (B1A4)		"Are You Looking Down on Me?"	161
418	June 17, 2019	Lee Hye-jeong, Kim Eon-joong & Kim Seung-hyun, Hong Yoon-hwa		"A Changed Man"	135
419	June 24, 2019	Park Ji-woo, Ha Sang-wook, Lee Guk-joo, Park Yoo-ha		"Unexpected Parenting"	150
420	July 1, 2019	Don Spike, Kim Ji-woo, GFriend (Eunha, Yuju), Jung Hyuk		"Dozens of Grandchildren"	163
421	July 8, 2019	Jun Jin (Shinhwa), Ailee, Austin Kang, Park Kyung (Block B)		"A Story of the Other Side of the World"	161
422	July 15, 2019	Ahn Il-kwon, Soy Kim, Gong Seo-young, Euijin (Bigflo), Saebom (Nature)		"Are All Korean Men Like This?"	183
423	July 22, 2019	Kim Sae-rom, Sam Okyere, MC Gree, NCT Dream (Jaemin, Jeno)		"Too Much Boyfriend"	162
424	July 29, 2019	Ji Sang-ryeol, Kim Yo-han, Ben, GWSN (Anne, Lena)		"I Want to Stop Dreaming"	160
425	August 12, 2019	Song Jae-rim, Seo Tae-hoon, Sejeong (Gugudan), Oh My Girl (YooA, Seunghee)		"Find the Mother of My Kids"	161
426	August 19, 2019	g.o.d (Son Ho-young, Kim Tae-woo), Shorry J (Mighty Mouth), Kim Seung-hye		"I Want to Tear Them Up!"	165
427	August 26, 2019	Kim Na-young, Wink, Tyler Rasch, Oh Ha-young (Apink)		"The Terrifying Woman"	171
428	September 2, 2019	Chun Myung-hoon (NRG), Moon Jeong-won, Jason, Laboum (Yujeong, Solbin)		"Send Her to a Dentist"	163
429	September 16, 2019	Hong Kyung-min, Kang Yoo-mi, Dotty, Irene Kim		"I Want to Hold onto This Man"	168
430	September 23, 2019	Oh Ji-ho, Choi Dong-seok, Seventeen (S.Coups, Seungkwan), Lana		"Do You Want to Die?"	167
431	September 30, 2019	Baek Ji-young, Hwang Je-sung, Twice (Momo, Dahyun)		"My Husband Wants to Kick Me Out."	155

== Four Helpers ==
In January 2016, KBS threatened legal action against Shanghai Media Group for their show Four Helpers (四大名助), claiming that the show plagiarized Hello Counselor's set design, format, voting and scoring system, and other aspects of the show. A statement issued by KBS stated that they had demanded the immediate termination of the show's broadcast on the grounds publication right infringement and that, if the broadcasts continued, they would involve the Chinese State Administration of Press, Publication, Radio, Film and Television and pursue legal action.

== Awards and nominations ==
Year	Award	Category	Recipient	Result
2011	10th KBS Entertainment Awards	Best Teamwork Award	Hello Counselor	Won
2012	11th KBS Entertainment Awards	Grand Prize (Daesang)	Shin Dong-yup (for Hello Counselor and Immortal Songs 2)	Won
2012	11th KBS Entertainment Awards	Excellence Award for Variety Show (Female)	Lee Young-ja (for Hello Counselor and Invincible Youth 2)	Won
2012	11th KBS Entertainment Awards	Excellence Award for Variety Show (Male)	Cultwo (Jung Chan-woo and Kim Tae-gyun)	Won
2013	12th KBS Entertainment Awards	Excellence Award for Variety Show (Male)	Cultwo (Jung Chan-woo and Kim Tae-gyun)	Won
2013	49th Baeksang Arts Awards	Best Male Variety Performer	Cultwo (Jung Chan-woo and Kim Tae-gyun)	Nominated
2013	49th Baeksang Arts Awards	Best Female Variety Performer	Lee Young-ja	Nominated
2014	50th Baeksang Arts Awards	Best Female Variety Performer	Lee Young-ja	Nominated
2015	51st Baeksang Arts Awards	Best Female Variety Performer	Lee Young-ja	Nominated
2015	14th KBS Entertainment Awards	Top Excellence Award for Variety Show	Lee Young-ja	Nominated
2015	14th KBS Entertainment Awards	Viewers' Choice Program of the Year	Hello Counselor	Nominated
2016	15th KBS Entertainment Awards	Grand Prize (Daesang)	Shin Dong-yup	Nominated
2016	15th KBS Entertainment Awards	Viewers' Choice Program of the Year	Hello Counselor	Nominated
2016	15th KBS Entertainment Awards	Top Excellence Award in Talk Show	Lee Young-ja	Nominated
2016	15th KBS Entertainment Awards	Rookie Award in Talk Show	Choi Tae-joon	Won
2018	16th KBS Entertainment Awards	Grand Prize (Daesang)	Lee Young-ja	Won
2018	16th KBS Entertainment Awards	Grand Prize (Daesang)	Shin Dong-yup	Nominated
2018	16th KBS Entertainment Awards	Excellence Award in Talk/Show Category	Kim Tae-gyun	Nominated
2018	16th KBS Entertainment Awards	Broadcasting Screenwriter Award	Screenwriter team	Won
2018	16th KBS Entertainment Awards	Viewers' Choice Best Program Award	Hello Counselor	Nominated
2018	16th KBS Entertainment Awards	Best Teamwork Award	Hello Counselor	Won
2019	17th KBS Entertainment Awards	Producers' Special Award	Shin Dong-yup	Won
