= Strong Heart (talk show) =

South Korean talk show

- Logo
- Hangul: 강심장
- Hanja: 强心臟
- RR: Gangsimjang
- MR: Kangsimjang
- Genre: Variety, talk show
- Written by: Kim Youn-young; Kim Jee-youn
- Directed by: Park Sang-hyuk
- Presented by: Kang Ho-dong (2009–2011); Lee Seung-gi (2009–2012); Lee Dong-wook (2012–2013); Shin Dong-yup (2012–2013)
- Starring: Boom; Leeteuk (2009–2012); Eunhyuk; Shindong (2009–2012)
- Opening theme: Strong Heart Logo Song by Super Junior
- Country of origin: South Korea
- Original language: Korean
- No. of episodes: 166

Production
- Producers: Park Kyung-deok; Jung Ik-sung
- Running time: 70-90 minutes

Original release
- Network: Seoul Broadcasting System
- Release: 6 October 2009 – 12 February 2013

Strong Heart (Korean: 강심장; RR: Gangsimjang) is a South Korean talk show or talk battle broadcast by SBS. It aired on Tuesdays from 11:50 to Wednesdays 00:30. It was hosted by Kang Ho-dong and Lee Seung-gi, and later by Lee Dong-wook and Shin Dong-yup with Boom, Super Junior's Leeteuk, Shindong and Eunhyuk as hosts of a special segment and regular guests along with Kim Hyo-jin, Jung Ju-ri and Yang Se-hyung, who are known as six-fixed guests. The program relaunched as a second season with Shin Dong-yup and new hosts, actress, Kim Hee-sun, and singer, Yoon Jong-shin, in February 2013.

== History ==
The show premiered on 6 October 2009 with Kang Ho-dong and Lee Seung-gi as MCs. In September 2011, Kang withdrew from the show following his temporary retirement from the entertainment industry due to controversy regarding his non-payment of taxes. After hosting solo since Kang's departure, Lee announced in March 2012 that he was leaving the show. He recorded his last episode on March 15, which was broadcast on April 3. Actor Lee Dong-wook and Shin Dong-yup took over as MCs, with their first episode broadcast on April 10, 2012.

In December 2012, it was announced that the show's director, Park Sang-hyuk, left the show for an overseas sabbatical. The show's director was replaced by Shin Hyo-jung with a format changed. The last episode for season one was recorded on 17 January 2013, marking this as MC Lee Dong-wook's last appearance. It was announced on 15 January 2013 that the program will be relaunched as season two with a new format. Shin Dong-yup will remain as host, along with Kim Hee-sun and Yoon Jong-shin, being the first time as main MC for a variety show for Kim. The show is titled Hwasin - Controller of the Heart ("Hwashin" meaning God of Tuesday and God of Talk), with a scaled-down guest panel of four to five guests per episode; to air in mid-February 2013. The new season is billed as "an honest talk show based on topics based on the opinions of viewers".

In March 2023, SBS announced a reboot of the show, tentatively titled Strong Heart League.

== Format ==
About twenty guest stars tell emotional stories to make people cry or laugh. The best storyteller wins the show. Strong Heart gives viewers and fans a chance to look into the lives of stars by listening to their stories. Many stars come on the show and share stories about their hardships in debuting, strange experiences or some other funny situations that have occurred in their lives. Celebrities have also used their time on the show to try to clear up rumors.

== Cast ==
- Main MC
  - Kang Ho-dong (2009–2011)
  - Lee Seung-gi (2009–2012)
  - Lee Dong-wook (2012–2013)
  - Shin Dong-yup (2012–2013)
- Academy
  - Boom
  - Leeteuk (2009–2012)
  - Shindong (2009–2012)
  - Eunhyuk (2009–2013)

== Winners ==
List of winners
- 1st Strong Heart - Oh Young-shil (Episode 1)
- 2nd Strong Heart - Lee Eui-jung (Episode 2)
- 3rd Strong Heart - Im Chang-jung (Episode 3)
- 4th Strong Heart - Hong Seok-cheon (Episode 4 and 5)
- 5th Strong Heart - Seo In-guk (Episode 6)
- 6th Strong Heart - Leeteuk of Super Junior, (Episode 7 and 8)
- 7th Strong Heart - Jo Hye-ryun (Episode 9)
- 8th Strong Heart - Jung Chan-woo (broadcasts in two episodes, episode 10 until first half of episode 11)
- 9th Strong Heart - Kim Jang-hoon, Christmas special, broadcasts in two episodes which 2nd half of episode 11 and continue until episode 12
- 10th Strong Heart - Bada, (Episode 13 and 14)
- 11th Strong Heart - Bbaek Ga of Koyote, special appointed since the story about him struggling with his brain tumor (Episode 15 and 16)
- 12th Strong Heart - Kim Gi-wook (broadcasts in two episodes, episode 17 until first half of episode 18)
- 13th Strong Heart - Junho of 2PM (broadcasts in two episodes which 2nd half of episode 18 and continue until episode 19)
- 14th Strong Heart - Oh Jung-hae (Episode 20 and 21)
- 15th Strong Heart - Kim Na-young (Episode 22)
- 16th Strong Heart - Kim Jong-kook (Episode 23 and 24)
- 17th Strong Heart - Ha Chun-hwa (Episode 25 and 26)
- 18th Strong Heart - Rain (Episode 27 and 28)
- 19th Strong Heart - Bae Seul-ki (Episode 29 and 30)
- 20th Strong Heart - Yoo Sang-chul (Episode 31 and 32)
- 21st Strong Heart - Shindong of Super Junior (Episode 33 and 34)
- 22nd Strong Heart - Seungri of Big Bang (Episode 35 and 36)
- 23rd Strong Heart - No Min-woo (Episode 37 and 38)
- 24th Strong Heart - Park Jung-ah (Episode 39 and 40)
- 25th Strong Heart - Se7en (Episode 41 and 42)
- 26th Strong Heart - Ryu Si-won (Episode 43 and 44)
- 27th Strong Heart - Choi Hong-man (Episode 45 and 46)
- 28th Strong Heart - Oh Jong-hyuk (Episode 47 and 48)
- 29th Strong Heart - Yoon Son-ha (Episode 49 and 50)
- 30th Strong Heart - Huh Gak (Episode 51 and 52)
- 31st Strong Heart - Sooyoung of Girls' Generation (Episode 53 and 54)
- 32nd Strong Heart - Lee Moo Song (Episode 55 and 56)
- 33rd Strong Heart - Ahn Mun-sook (Episode 57 and 58)
- 34th Strong Heart - (Episode 59 and 60)
- 35th Strong Heart - Jo Kwon of 2AM (Episode 61 and 62)
- 36th Strong Heart - Yunho of TVXQ (Episode 63 and 64)
- 37th Strong Heart - Kim Ja-ok (Episode 65 and 66)
- 38th Strong Heart - Kang Soo-ji (Episode 67 and 68)
- 39th Strong Heart - Dokgo Young-jae (Episode 69 and 70)
- 40th Strong Heart - Tae Jin-ah (Episode 71 and 72)
- 44th Strong Heart - Oh Jung-hae (episode 81, 82 and 83)
- 49th Strong Heart - Kyuhyun of Super Junior (Episode 92 and 93)
- 50th Strong Heart - Yoo Hyun-sang (Episode 94 and 95)
- 51st Strong Heart - Lee Ye-rin, last episode with MC Kang Ho-dong (Episode 96 and 97)
- 52nd Strong Heart - Vicky of Diva (Episode 98 and 99)
- 54th Strong Heart - Kim Ji-sook (Episode 101 and 102)
- 55th Strong Heart - Seo Kyung-seok (Episode 103 and 104)
- 56th Strong Heart - Lee Bon (Episode 105 and 106)
- 63rd Strong Heart - Park Eun-hye (Episode 119 and 120)
- 64th Strong Heart - Kim Ae-kyung (Episode 121 and 122)
- 65th Strong Heart - Se7en, YG family special and last episode with Lee Seung-gi (Episode 123 and 124)
- 66th Strong Heart - Lee Jin-wook, first episode with host Shin Dong-yup and Lee Dong-wook (Episode 125 and 126)
- 67th Strong Heart - Ivy (Episode 127 and 128)
- 68th Strong Heart - Baek A-yeon (Episode 129 and 130)
- 69th Strong Heart - Choi Yoon-young (Episode 131 and 132)
- 70th Strong Heart - Cultwo (Jung Chan-woo and Kim Tae-gyun) (Episode 133 and 134)
- 71st Strong Heart - Kim Bu-seon (Episode 135 and 136)
- 72nd Strong Heart - Bang Eun-hee (Episode 137 and 138)
- 73rd Strong Heart - Jeon Soo-kyung (Episode 139 and 140)
- 75th Strong Heart - Hong Seok-cheon (broadcasts in two episodes which 2nd half of episode 142 and continue until episode 143)
- 76th Strong Heart - Kim Ki-duk (Episode 144 and 145)
- 77th Strong Heart - Lee Ji-hyun (Episode 146 and 147)
- 78th Strong Heart - Nancy Lang (Episode 148)
- 80th Strong Heart - Byul (Episode 150)
- 81st Strong Heart - Song Chong-gug (Episode 151 and 152)
- 82nd Strong Heart - Park Gwang-hyun (Episode 155 and 156)
- 85th Strong Heart - Kim Jung-hwa (Episode 161 and 162)
- 86th Strong Heart - Kim Chang-ryeol of DJ DOC (Episode 163 and 164)
- 87th Strong Heart - Sooyoung of Girls' Generation (Episode 165 and 166)

== List of episodes and guests ==
=== 2009 ===
List of episodes in 2009 (episode 1–12)

Episode #	Broadcast Date	Guests
1	2009-10-06	BigBang's G-Dragon and Seungri, Girls' Generation's Yoona, Epik High, Baek Ji-young, Kim Tae-woo, Brian, Jang Yoon-jeong, Han Sung-joo, Kim Young-ho, MC Mong, Boom, Oh Young-sil, Kyeon Mi-ri, Moon Jeong-hee, Nancy Lang, Solbi, Kim Hyo-jin, Yoo Se-yoon, Han Min-gwan, Ahn Young-mi, Buga Kingz' Juvie Train
2	2009-10-13	2NE1, Kara's Hara and Nicole, Super Junior's Leeteuk and Eunhyuk, Epik High's Tablo, Brian, Hong Seok-cheon, Insooni, Hyun Young, Moon Se-yoon, Jubi, Kim Hyo-jin, Nancy Lang, Solbi, Yoo Chae-yeong, Lee Eui-jeong
3	2009-10-20	Girls' Generation's Sooyoung, Brown Eyed Girls' Ga In and Narsha, Super Junior's Shindong and Eunhyuk, 2AM's Jo Kwon, Brian, Park Ye-jin, Seo In-young, Jang Na-ra, Lee Soo-young, Solbi, Im Chang-jung, Boom, Kim Han-seok, Kim Hee-won, Juvie Train, Kim Ga-yeon, Kim Hyo-jin, Nancy Lang, Seo Yoo-jung, Oh Young-sil
4	2009-10-27	Fly to the Sky's Brian and Hwanhee, Girls' Generation's Yoona and Tiffany, Kara's Gyu Ri and Seung-yeon, Super Junior's Leeteuk and Eunhyuk, Hong Suk-cheon, Im Sung-min, Park Hyun-bin, Kim Tae-hoon, Moon Cheon-shik, Hong Jin-young, Yang Jung-a, Boom, Kim Young-chul, Kim Hyo-jin, Nancy Lang, Solbi, Juvie Train
5	2009-11-03	Fly to the Sky's Brian and Hwanhee, Girls' Generation's Yoona and Tiffany, Kara's Gyu Ri and Seung-yeon, Super Junior's Leeteuk and Eunhyuk, Hong Suk-cheon, Im Sung-min, Park Hyun-bin, Kim Tae-hoon, Moon Cheon-shik, Hong Jin-young, Yang Jung-a, Boom, Kim Young-chul, Kim Hyo-jin, Nancy Lang, Solbi, Juvie Train
6	2009-11-10	Super Junior's Leeteuk and Eunhyuk, Girls' Generation's Yuri and Sunny, Brian, Son Dam-bi, Kim Tae-woo, Tei, Seo In-guk, Jo Dong-hyuk, Im Hyung-joon, Park Sang-wook, Park Dool-sun, Boom, Kim Hyo-jin, Kim Na-young, Jung Joo-ri, Kim Young-chul, Nancy Lang, Juvie Train
7	2009-11-17	Super Junior's Leeteuk, Eunhyuk, and Shindong, Girls' Generation's Jessica, Solbi, Eun Ji-won, MC Mong, g.o.d's Danny Ahn, Kim Ji-woo, Han Young, Baek Boram, Moon Cheon-shik, Kim Young-chul, Kang Ji-sub, Seo Ji-seok, Kim Hyo-jin, Jung Joo-ri, Nancy Lang, Juvie Train
8	2009-11-24	Super Junior's Leeteuk, Eunhyuk, and Shindong, Girls' Generation's Jessica, Solbi, Eun Ji-won, MC Mong, g.o.d's Danny Ahn, Kim Ji-woo, Han Young, Baek Boram, Moon Cheon-shik, Kim Young-chul, Kang Ji-sub, Seo Ji-seok, Kim Hyo-jin, Jung Joo-ri, Nancy Lang, Juvie Train
9	2009-12-01	SS501's Kim Kyu-jong and Heo Young-saeng, Super Junior's Leeteuk, Eunhyuk, and Shindong, Solbi, Andy, Danny Ahn, Hwangbo, Alex, Horan, Hong Kyung-min, Chae Young-in, Han Ye-won, Kim Tae-hoon, Jo Hye-ryun, Hwang Hye-young, Nancy Lang, Kim Hyo-jin, Kim Young-chul, Juvie Train
10	2009-12-08	SS501's Kim Hyun-joong, Kim Hyung-jun, and Park Jung-min, Super Junior's Leeteuk, Eunhyuk, and Shindong, Girls' Generation's Taeyeon, Seohyun, and Hyoyeon, g.o.d's Danny Ahn, Brian, Lee Chun-hee, Yang Mi-ra, Yang Eun-ji, Jin Bora, Kim San-ho, Solbi, Ji Sang-ryeol, Cultwo's Jung Chan-woo and Kim Tae-gyun, Kim Hyo-jin, Jung Joo-ri, Nancy Lang
11	2009-12-15	SS501's Kim Hyun-joong, Kim Hyung-jun, and Park Jung-min, Super Junior's Leeteuk, Eunhyuk, and Shindong, Girls' Generation's Taeyeon, Seohyun, and Hyoyeon, g.o.d's Danny Ahn, Brian, Lee Chun-hee, Yang Mi-ra, Yang Eun-ji, Jin Bora, Kim San-ho, Solbi, Ji Sang-ryeol, Cultwo's Jung Chan-woo and Kim Tae-gyun, Kim Hyo-jin, Jung Joo-ri, Nancy Lang
12	2009-12-22	Girls' Generation's Taeyeon, Seohyun, and Hyoyeon, Super Junior's Leeteuk, Eunhyuk, and Shindong, Brian, Eun Ji-won, g.o.d's Danny Ahn, Kim Jang-hoon, PSY, Shin Bong-sun, Heo Yi-jae, Won Ki-joon, Lee Eun-gyeol, Yeo Wook-hwan, Byul, Lee Yoo-jin, Kim Young-chul, Kim Hyo-jin, Jung Joo-ri, Nancy Lang

=== 2010 ===
List of episodes in 2010 (episode 13–57)

Episode #	Broadcast Date	Guests
13	2010-01-05	BigBang's Taeyang and Daesung, Kara's Park Gyu-ri and Hara, Super Junior's Leeteuk, Shindong, and Eunhyuk, Brian Joo, Bada, Lee Se-eun, Chae Min-seo, Choi Phillip, Go Young-wook, Chun Myung-hoon, Jang Young-ran, Kim Hyo-jin, Kim Young-chul, Jung Joo-ri
14	2010-01-12	BigBang's Taeyang and Daesung, Kara's Park Gyu-ri and Hara, Super Junior's Leeteuk, Shindong, and Eunhyuk, Brian Joo, Bada, Lee Se-eun, Chae Min-seo, Choi Phillip, Go Young-wook, Chun Myung-hoon, Jang Young-ran, Kim Hyo-jin, Kim Young-chul, Jung Joo-ri
15	2010-01-19	T-ara's Hyomin and Eunjung, Super Junior's Leeteuk, Shindong, and Eunhyuk, Danny Ahn, Brian Joo, Kan Mi-youn, Shin Ji, Park So-hyun, Kim Jong-min, Chun Myung-hoon, Noh Yoo-min, Kim Joon-hee, Im Chang-jung, Shim Eun-jin, Jung Joo-ri, Kim Hyo-jin, Kim Young-chul
16	2010-01-26	T-ara's Hyomin and Eunjung, Super Junior's Leeteuk, Shindong, and Eunhyuk, Danny Ahn, Brian Joo, Kan Mi-youn, Shin Ji, Park So-hyun, Kim Jong-min, Chun Myung-hoon, Noh Yoo-min, Kim Joon-hee, Im Chang-jung, Shim Eun-jin, Jung Joo-ri, Kim Hyo-jin, Kim Young-chul
17	2010-02-02	Super Junior's Leeteuk, Shindong, and Eunhyuk, CNBLUE's Yonghwa, MBLAQ's Lee Joon, After School's Uee and Kahi, Brown Eyed Girls' Narsha and JeA, Brian, Danny Ahn, Jeong Ga-eun, Wheesung, Kim Jung-min, Kim Ki-wook, Kim Young-chul, Jung Joo-ri, Kim Hyo-jin
18	2010-02-09	Super Junior's Leeteuk, Shindong, and Eunhyuk, CNBLUE's Yonghwa, MBLAQ's Lee Joon, After School's Uee and Kahi, Brown Eyed Girls' Narsha and JeA, Brian, Danny Ahn, Jeong Ga-eun, Wheesung, Kim Jung-min, Kim Ki-wook, Kim Young-chul, Jung Joo-ri, Kim Hyo-jin
19	2010-02-16	Super Junior's Leeteuk, Shindong, and Eunhyuk, Girls' Generation's Yoona, Sooyoung, Tiffany, and Seohyun, 2PM's Taecyeon and Junho, Danny Ahn, Jeon Hye-bin, Hwang In-young, Hong Soo-ah, Kim Hye-young, Ahn Hong-jin, Hwang Chan-bin, Lee Soo-geun, Kim Young-chul, Kim Hyo-jin, Jung Joo-ri
20	2010-03-02	T-ara's Hyomin, Super Junior's Leeteuk, Shindong, and Sungmin, Secret's Sunhwa, Brian, Byun Woo-min, Kim Jin-soo, Lee Kyung-sil, Lee Young-ja, Oh Jung-hae, Hong Ji-min, Kim Chang-ryul, Kim Sook, Ahn Sun-young, Jung Joo-ri, Kim Hyo-jin, Kim Young-chul
21	2010-03-09	T-ara's Hyomin, Super Junior's Leeteuk, Shindong, and Sungmin, Secret's Sunhwa, Brian, Byun Woo-min, Kim Jin-soo, Lee Kyung-sil, Lee Young-ja, Oh Jung-hae, Hong Ji-min, Kim Chang-ryul, Kim Sook, Ahn Sun-young, Jung Joo-ri, Kim Hyo-jin, Kim Young-chul
22	2010-03-16	Super Junior's Leeteuk, Shindong, and Eunhyuk, Song Joong-ki, Go Joo-won, Brian, Seo Ji-seok, Lee Young-eun, Shin Ji-soo, Koo Jun-yup, Park Mi-kyung, Ahn Sun-young, Kim Na-young, Rainbow's Kim Jae-kyung, Kim Young-chul, Kim Hyo-jin, Danny Ahn
23	2010-03-23	Super Junior's Leeteuk, Shindong, and Eunhyuk, Girls' Generation's Jessica and Sunny, Kara's Hara and Nicole, F.T. Island's Hongki, Kim Jong-kook, K.Will, Brian, Mighty Mouth's Sangchu, Lee Hyun-ji, Wi Yang-ho, Lee So-jung, Lee Jong-soo, Yoo Tae-woong, Kim Hyo-jin, Kim Young-chul, Jung Joo-ri
24	2010-03-23	Super Junior's Leeteuk, Shindong, and Eunhyuk, Girls' Generation's Jessica and Sunny, Kara's Hara and Nicole, F.T. Island's Hongki, Kim Jong-kook, K.Will, Brian, Mighty Mouth's Sangchu, Lee Hyun-ji, Wi Yang-ho, Lee So-jung, Lee Jong-soo, Yoo Tae-woong, Kim Hyo-jin, Kim Young-chul, Jung Joo-ri
25	2010-04-13	SHINee's Onew, U-KISS' Dongho, Super Junior's Leeteuk, Shindong, and Eunhyuk, Brian, Ha Chun-hwa, Hwang Jung-eum, Ahn Jae-mo, Ko Eun-mi, Ryu Tae-joon, Yoo In-na, Lee Kwang-soo, Boohwal's Jung Dong-ha, Kim Hye-young, Hong Rok-gi, Kim Young-chul, Kim Hyo-jin, Jung Joo-ri
26	2010-04-20	SHINee's Onew, U-KISS' Dongho, Super Junior's Leeteuk, Shindong, and Eunhyuk, Brian, Ha Chun-hwa, Hwang Jung-eum, Ahn Jae-mo, Ko Eun-mi, Ryu Tae-joon, Yoo In-na, Lee Kwang-soo, Boohwal's Jung Dong-ha, Kim Hye-young, Hong Rok-gi, Kim Young-chul, Kim Hyo-jin, Jung Joo-ri
27	2010-05-04	Rain, Super Junior's Heechul, Leeteuk, Shindong, and Eunhyuk, T-ara's Hyomin and Jiyeon, After School's Kahi and Nana, MBLAQ's G.O, Epik High's Tablo and Mithra, Lee Tae-gon, Jung Chan-woo, Jeong Ga-eun, Lee Chae-young, Park Ki-woong, Hwang Hyun-hee, Kim Hyo-jin, Kim Young-chul, Jung Joo-ri
28	2010-05-11	Rain, Super Junior's Heechul, Leeteuk, Shindong, and Eunhyuk, T-ara's Hyomin and Jiyeon, After School's Kahi and Nana, MBLAQ's G.O, Epik High's Tablo and Mithra, Lee Tae-gon, Jung Chan-woo, Jeong Ga-eun, Lee Chae-young, Park Ki-woong, Hwang Hyun-hee, Kim Hyo-jin, Kim Young-chul, Jung Joo-ri
29	2010-05-18	Super Junior's Leeteuk, Shindong, and Eunhyuk, Girls' Generation's Hyoyeon and Yuri, KARA's Seungyeon and Jiyoung, Bae Seul-ki, SG Wannabe's Kim Yong-jun, Park Hyun-bin, Byun Ki-soo, Choi Ah-jin, Kim Jong-min, Shin Ji, Chun Myung-hoon, Jee Seok-jin, Park Soo-jin, Kim Tae-hyun, Hong Rok-gi, Kim Young-chul, Kim Hyo-jin, Jung Joo-ri
30	2010-05-25	Super Junior's Leeteuk, Shindong, and Eunhyuk, Girls' Generation's Hyoyeon and Yuri, KARA's Seungyeon and Jiyoung, Bae Seul-ki, SG Wannabe's Kim Yong-jun, Park Hyun-bin, Byun Ki-soo, Choi Ah-jin, Kim Jong-min, Shin Ji, Chun Myung-hoon, Jee Seok-jin, Park Soo-jin, Kim Tae-hyun, Hong Rok-gi, Kim Young-chul, Kim Hyo-jin, Jung Joo-ri
31	2010-06-01	2PM's Nichkhun and Junsu, Super Junior's Leeteuk, Shindong, and Eunhyuk, Yoo Sang-chul, Park Jun-gyu, Kim Ji-young, Cho Yeo-jeong, Yoon Ji-min, Han Jung-soo, Jeong Si-a, Kim Sung-kyung, Kim Young-chul, Kim Hyo-jin, Jung Joo-ri, Hong Kyung-min, Hong Seok-cheon
32	2010-06-08	2PM's Nichkhun and Junsu, Super Junior's Leeteuk, Shindong, and Eunhyuk, Yoo Sang-chul, Park Jun-gyu, Kim Ji-young, Cho Yeo-jeong, Yoon Ji-min, Han Jung-soo, Jeong Si-a, Kim Sung-kyung, Kim Young-chul, Kim Hyo-jin, Jung Joo-ri, Hong Kyung-min, Hong Seok-cheon
33	2010-07-06	Super Junior's Siwon, Donghae, and Kyuhyun, Kim Se-ah, Yoon Se-ah, Oh Ji-eun, Simon D, Jang Dong-min, Yoo Sang-mu, Kim Young-chul, Tak Jae-hoon, Jo Jung-rin, Kim Hyo-jin, Hong Kyung-min, Jung Joo-ri
34	2010-07-13	Super Junior's Siwon, Donghae, Kyuhyun, Leeteuk, Shindong, and Eunhyuk, Simon D, Hong Kyung-min, Kim Young-chul, Jo Jung-rin, Kim Hyo-jin, Kim Se-ah, Yoon Se-ah, Oh Ji-eun, Tak Jae-hoon, Yoo Sang-mu, Jung Joo-ri
35	2010-07-20	BigBang's Taeyang and Seungri, Super Junior's Leeteuk, Shindong, and Eunhyuk, T-ara's Jiyeon, Kan Mi-youn, MBLAQ's Mir, Chae Yeon, Song Eun-i, Ha Joo-hee, Hwangbo, Kim Jin, Yoon Shi-yoon, Hong Kyung-min, Kim Young-chul, Kim Hyo-jin, Jung Joo-ri
36	2010-07-27	BigBang's Taeyang and Seungri, Super Junior's Leeteuk, Shindong, and Eunhyuk, T-ara's Jiyeon, Kan Mi-youn, MBLAQ's Mir, Chae Yeon, Song Eun-i, Ha Joo-hee, Hwangbo, Kim Jin, Yoon Shi-yoon, Hong Kyung-min, Kim Young-chul, Kim Hyo-jin, Jung Joo-ri
37	2010-08-03	Shin Min-a, Super Junior's Leeteuk, Shindong, and Eunhyuk, 2AM's Seulong, Brown Eyed Girls' Narsha, Park Soo-jin, Eun Ji-won, No Min-woo, Hwang Hyun-hee, Ahn Hye-kyung, Oh Se-jung, Yang Se-hyung, Kim Ho-chang, Hong Kyung-min, Kim Young-chul, Kim Hyo-jin, Jung Joo-ri
38	2010-08-10	Shin Min-a, Super Junior's Leeteuk, Shindong, and Eunhyuk, 2AM's Seulong, Brown Eyed Girls' Narsha, Park Soo-jin, Eun Ji-won, No Min-woo, Hwang Hyun-hee, Ahn Hye-kyung, Oh Se-jung, Yang Se-hyung, Kim Ho-chang, Hong Kyung-min, Kim Young-chul, Kim Hyo-jin, Jung Joo-ri
39	2010-08-17	2PM's Chansung and Junho, CNBlue's Yonghwa, 4Minute's Hyuna and Gayoon, 2AM's Jinwoon, Son Dam-bi, After School's Kahi, Super Junior's Leeteuk, Shindong, and Eunhyuk, Shin Jung-hwan, Park Jung-ah, Hwang Bo-ra, Noh Sa-yeon, Go Young-wook, Hong Kyung-min, Kim Young-chul, Kim Hyo-jin, Jung Joo-ri
40	2010-08-24	2PM's Chansung and Junho, CNBlue's Yonghwa, 4Minute's Hyuna and Gayoon, 2AM's Jinwoon, Son Dam-bi, After School's Kahi, Super Junior's Leeteuk, Shindong, and Eunhyuk, Shin Jung-hwan, Park Jung-ah, Hwang Bo-ra, Noh Sa-yeon, Go Young-wook, Hong Kyung-min, Kim Young-chul, Kim Hyo-jin, Jung Joo-ri
41	2010-08-31	Se7en, SHINee's Key and Minho, Super Junior's Leeteuk, Shindong, and Eunhyuk, Han Chae-ah, Jung So-ra, Lee Tae-im, Choi Eun-kyung, Yoo Young-seok, Rottyful Sky, Choi Won-young, Hong Kyung-min, Kim Young-chul, Kim Hyo-jin, Jung Joo-ri
42	2010-09-07	Se7en, SHINee's Key and Minho, Super Junior's Leeteuk, Shindong, and Eunhyuk, Han Chae-ah, Jung So-ra, Lee Tae-im, Choi Eun-kyung, Yoo Young-seok, Rottyful Sky, Choi Won-young, Hong Kyung-min, Kim Young-chul, Kim Hyo-jin, Jung Joo-ri
43	2010-09-14	BEAST's Doojoon, Younha, Orange Caramel's Lizzy, Ryu Si-won, Super Junior's Leeteuk, Shindong, and Eunhyuk, Park Gwang-hyun, Jo Sung-mo, Yoon Hae-young, Lee Hyun-kyung, Lee Hee-jin, Jo Jung-rin, Hong Kyung-min, Kim Young-chul, Kim Hyo-jin, Jung Joo-ri
44	2010-09-21	BEAST's Doojoon, Younha, Orange Caramel's Lizzy, Ryu Si-won, Super Junior's Leeteuk, Shindong, and Eunhyuk, Park Gwang-hyun, Jo Sung-mo, Yoon Hae-young, Lee Hyun-kyung, Lee Hee-jin, Jo Jung-rin, Hong Kyung-min, Kim Young-chul, Kim Hyo-jin, Jung Joo-ri
45	2010-09-28	Miss A's Min and Jia, Super Junior's Leeteuk, Shindong, and Eunhyuk, Kim So-yeon, Jung Gyu-woon, Cha Ye-ryun, Lee Yoo-jin, Choi Hongman, Jo Hyung-ki, Choi Hwa-jung, Hong Kyung-min, Kim Young-chul, Kim Hyo-jin, Jung Joo-ri
46	2010-10-05	Miss A's Min and Jia, Super Junior's Leeteuk, Shindong, and Eunhyuk, Kim So-yeon, Jung Gyu-woon, Cha Ye-ryun, Lee Yoo-jin, Choi Hongman, Jo Hyung-ki, Choi Hwa-jung, Hong Kyung-min, Kim Young-chul, Kim Hyo-jin, Jung Joo-ri
47	2010-10-12	T-ara's Eunjung, Super Junior's Shindong, Seo In-young, Danny Ahn, Shim Eun-jin, Oh Jong-hyuk, Lee Yeon-doo, Kim Heung-soo, Lee Hae-in, Jo Hye-ryun, Jung Chan, Park Jae-jung, Hong Kyung-min, Kim Young-chul, Kim Hyo-jin, Jung Joo-ri
48	2010-10-19	T-ara's Eunjung, Super Junior's Shindong, Seo In-young, Danny Ahn, Shim Eun-jin, Oh Jong-hyuk, Lee Yeon-doo, Kim Heung-soo, Lee Hae-in, Jo Hye-ryun, Jung Chan, Park Jae-jung, Hong Kyung-min, Kim Young-chul, Kim Hyo-jin, Jung Joo-ri
49	2010-10-26	2NE1's Dara and Bom, 2PM's Nichkhun and Wooyoung, Brown Eyed Girls' Gain, Yoon Seung-ah, ZE:A's Hwang Kwang-hee, Super Junior's Leeteuk, Eunhyuk, and Shindong, V.O.S' Kim Kyung-rok, PSY, Yoon Son-ha, Jang Mi-inae, Hong Kyung-min, Kim Young-chul, Kim Hyo-jin
50	2010-11-02	2NE1's Dara and Bom, 2PM's Nichkhun and Wooyoung, Brown Eyed Girls' Gain, Yoon Seung-ah, ZE:A's Hwang Kwang-hee, Super Junior's Leeteuk, Eunhyuk, and Shindong, V.O.S' Kim Kyung-rok, PSY, Yoon Son-ha, Jang Mi-inae, Hong Kyung-min, Kim Young-chul, Kim Hyo-jin
51	2010-11-09	KARA's Gyuri and Jiyoung, Superstar K's Huh Gak and John Park, IU, Super Junior's Leeteuk, Eunhyuk, and Shindong, An Jin-kyoung, Tony Ahn, Yoon Jong-shin, Yoon Yoo-sun, Lee Yu-ri, Yang Se-hyung, Jung Suk-won, Jung Sung-ho, Hong Kyung-min, Kim Young-chul, Kim Hyo-jin
52	2010-11-16	KARA's Gyuri and Jiyoung, Superstar K's Huh Gak and John Park, IU, Super Junior's Leeteuk, Eunhyuk, and Shindong, An Jin-kyoung, Tony Ahn, Yoon Jong-shin, Yoon Yoo-sun, Lee Yu-ri, Yang Se-hyung, Jung Suk-won, Jung Sung-ho, Hong Kyung-min, Kim Young-chul, Kim Hyo-jin
53	2010-11-30	Girls' Generation's Yuri and Sooyoung, CNBLUE's Minhyuk, Super Junior's Donghae, Leeteuk, Eunhyuk, and Shindong, Orange Caramel's Lizzy, Moon Hee Joon, Moon Chae Won
54	2010-12-07	Girls' Generation's Yuri and Sooyoung, CNBLUE's Minhyuk, Super Junior's Donghae, Leeteuk, Eunhyuk, and Shindong, Orange Caramel's Lizzy, Moon Hee Joon, Moon Chae Won
55	2010-12-14	f(x)'s Victoria, Hwangbo, Super Junior's Leeteuk and Eunhyuk
56	2010-12-21	f(x)'s Victoria, Hwangbo, Super Junior's Leeteuk and Eunhyuk
57	2010-12-28	Kim Ah Joong, T-ara's Jiyeon and Soyeon, ZE:A's Kwanghee, Super Junior's Leeteuk and Eunhyuk

=== 2011 ===
List of episodes in 2011 (episode 58–110)

Episode #	Broadcast Date	Guests
58	2011-01-04	Kim Ah-joong, T-ara (Jiyeon, Soyeon), Kwanghee (ZE:A), Super Junior (Leeteuk, Eunhyuk)
59	2011-01-11	Orange Caramel (Raina, Lizzy), Lee Jung, Super Junior (Leeteuk, Eunhyuk)
60	2011-01-18	Orange Caramel (Raina, Lizzy), Lee Jung, Super Junior (Leeteuk, Eunhyuk)
61	2011-01-25	Lee Yeon-hee, Park Jung Min, Jo Kwon from 2 AM, Doojoon from BEAST, Moon Hee-joon, Super Junior (Leeteuk, Eunhyuk, Shindong)
62	2011-02-01	Lee Yeon-hee, Park Jung Min, Jo Kwon from 2 AM, Doojoon from BEAST, Moon Hee-joon, Super Junior (Leeteuk, Eunhyuk, Shindong)
63	2011-02-08	TVXQ (Yunho, Max Changmin), Lee Jong-suk, Yoo Ha-na, Mina from Girl's Day, Super Junior (Leeteuk, Eunhyuk, Shindong), Gong Hyung-jin, Johnny Yune, Shin Joo-ah, Kim Min-ji
64	2011-02-15	TVXQ (Yunho, Max Changmin), Lee Jong-suk, Yoo Ha-na, Mina from Girl's Day, Super Junior (Leeteuk, Eunhyuk, Shindong), Gong Hyung-jin, Johnny Yune, Shin Joo-ah, Kim Min-ji
65	2011-02-22	BigBang (G-Dragon, Seungri), Dongwan from Shinhwa, Henry from Super Junior-M, Super Junior (Shindong, Eunhyuk)
66	2011-03-01	BigBang (G-Dragon, Seungri), Dongwan from Shinhwa, Henry from Super Junior-M, Super Junior (Shindong, Eunhyuk)
67	2011-03-08	Cast of 49 Days, Lee Joon from MBLAQ, Park Han-byul, Yoo In-na, Moon Hee-joon
68	2011-03-15	Cast of 49 Days, Lee Joon from MBLAQ, Park Han-byul, Yoo In-na, Moon Hee-joon
69	2011-03-22	Kim Tae-woo, Luna from f(x), Onew from SHINee, Sungjong from Infinite, Kim Bo-sung, Super Junior (Leeteuk, Eunhyuk, Shindong), Im Ye-jin, Cha Yu-ram, Lee Ji-hye, Park Sung-kwang, Dokgo Young-jae
70	2011-03-29	Kim Tae-woo, Luna from f(x), Onew from SHINee, Sungjong from Infinite, Kim Bo-sung, Super Junior (Leeteuk, Eunhyuk, Shindong), Im Ye-jin, Cha Yu-ram, Lee Ji-hye, Park Sung-kwang, Dokgo Young-jae
71	2011-04-05	Dongho from U-Kiss, Younha, Shorry J from Mighty Mouth, Tae Jin Ah, Park Joon Geum, Jung Sun Kyung, Jang Shin Young, Hwang Sun Hee, Lee Byung Jin, Super Junior (Leeteuk, Shindong), Moon Hee Jun
72	2011-04-12	Dongho from U-Kiss, Younha, Shorry J from Mighty Mouth, Tae Jin Ah, Park Joon Geum, Jung Sun Kyung, Jang Shin Young, Hwang Sun Hee, Lee Byung Jin, Super Junior (Leeteuk, Shindong), Moon Hee Jun
73	2011-04-19	Kim Hyung Jun from SS501, CN Blue (Yonghwa, Jungshin), Kwanghee from ZE:A, Wang Young Eun, Lee Byung Joon, Hyoun Young, Joo Young Hoon, Jennifer Lee, Son Eun Seo, Super Junior (Leeteuk, Shindong), Moon Hee Jun
74	2011-04-26	Kim Hyung Jun from SS501, CN Blue (Yonghwa, Jungshin), Kwanghee from ZE:A, Wang Young Eun, Lee Byung Joon, Hyoun Young, Joo Young Hoon, Jennifer Lee, Son Eun Seo, Super Junior (Leeteuk, Shindong), Moon Hee Jun
75	2011-05-03	Uee (After School), Chundong (MBLAQ), Choi Yeo Jin, Sun Woo Jae Duk, On Ju Wan, Lena Park, Yoon Young Ah, Kim Jun Hee, Super Junior (Leeteuk, Shindong), Moon Hee Jun, etc.
76	2011-05-10	Uee (After School), Chundong (MBLAQ), Choi Yeo Jin, Sun Woo Jae Duk, On Ju Wan, Lena Park, Yoon Young Ah, Kim Jun Hee, Super Junior (Leeteuk, Shindong), Moon Hee Jun, etc.
77	2011-05-17	Jang Woo Hyuk, Kara, Baek Ji Young, Shin Bong Sun, Lee Jung Seob, Kim Ji Sook, Kim Jung Nan, Kim Young Chul, Kim Hyo Jin, Moon Hee Jun, Jo Jung Rin, Super Junior (Leeteuk, Shindong)
78	2011-05-24	Jang Woo Hyuk, Kara, Baek Ji Young, Shin Bong Sun, Lee Jung Seob, Kim Ji Sook, Kim Jung Nan, Kim Young Chul, Kim Hyo Jin, Moon Hee Jun, Jo Jung Rin, Super Junior (Leeteuk, Shindong)
79	2011-05-31	Super Junior (Heechul, Leeteuk, Shindong), Suzy from miss A, Woori from Rainbow, Lee Young Ah, Lee Kwang Ki, Kang Min Kyung, Kim Jin Woo, Kwon Min Jung, Christina, Song Dae Hyun, Moon Hee Jun
80	2011-06-06	Super Junior (Heechul, Leeteuk, Shindong), Suzy from miss A, Woori from Rainbow, Lee Young Ah, Lee Kwang Ki, Kang Min Kyung, Kim Jin Woo, Kwon Min Jung, Christina, Song Dae Hyun, Moon Hee Jun
81	2011-06-07	Yunho from TVXQ, Kim Hyun-joong from SS501, Park Jung Ah, Junho from 2PM, Super Junior (Shindong, Leeteuk), Kwanghee from ZE:A, Park In Young, Moon Hee Jun, Hongman Choi, Ahn Moon-sook, Hong Seok-cheon, Oh Jeong-hae, Gu Bon-seung, Yun Hyeong-bin
82	2011-06-14	Yunho from TVXQ, Kim Hyun-joong from SS501, Park Jung Ah, Junho from 2PM, Super Junior (Shindong, Leeteuk), Kwanghee from ZE:A, Park In Young, Moon Hee Jun, Hongman Choi, Ahn Moon-sook, Hong Seok-cheon, Oh Jeong-hae, Gu Bon-seung, Yun Hyeong-bin
83	2011-06-21	Yunho from TVXQ, Kim Hyun-joong from SS501, Park Jung Ah, Junho from 2PM, Super Junior (Shindong, Leeteuk), Kwanghee from ZE:A, Park In Young, Moon Hee Jun, Hongman Choi, Ahn Moon-sook, Hong Seok-cheon, Oh Jeong-hae, Gu Bon-seung, Yun Hyeong-bin
84	2011-06-28	Alex, Hyosung (Secret), Gong Hyun Joo, Gu Bon Seung, Sul Woon Do. Park Hyun Bin, Super Junior (Shindong, Leeteuk, Eunhyuk), Moon Hee Jun, etc.
85	2011-07-05	Alex, Hyosung (Secret), Gong Hyun Joo, Gu Bon Seung, Sul Woon Do. Park Hyun Bin, Super Junior (Shindong, Leeteuk, Eunhyuk), Moon Hee Jun, etc.
86	2011-07-12	Ryu Shi Won, Park So Hyun, Lee Ji Hoon, Sulli (f(x)), Yun So Yi, Kim Sung Joo, Super Junior (Shindong, Leeteuk, Eunhyuk), Kwanghee (ZE:A), Moon Hee Jun, etc.
87	2011-07-19	Sulli (f(x)), Super Junior (Shindong, Leeteuk, Eunhyuk), Lee Ji Hoon, etc.
88	2011-07-26	Taecyeon (2PM), Krystal (f(x)), Woori, Kim Byoung Man, Super Junior (Shindong, Leeteuk, Eunhyuk), etc.
89	2011-08-02	Taecyeon (2PM), Krystal (f(x)), Woori, Kim Byoung Man, Super Junior (Shindong, Leeteuk, Eunhyuk), etc.
90	2011-08-09	G.O (MBLAQ), Im Sang A, Song Kyung Ah, Lee Yoon Mi, Super Junior (Shindong, Leeteuk, Eunhyuk), etc.
91	2011-08-16	G.O (MBLAQ), Im Sang A, Song Kyung Ah, Lee Yoon Mi, Super Junior (Shindong, Leeteuk, Eunhyuk), etc.
92	2011-08-23	Super Junior, Lim Soo Hyang, Sung Hoon, Song Kyung Chul, Choi Min Soo
93	2011-08-30	Super Junior, Lim Soo Hyang, Sung Hoon, Song Kyung Chul, Choi Min Soo
94	2011-09-06	Boom, Noh Joo Hyun, SNSD (Sunny, Seohyun), Jeon Hye Bin, BMK, Baek Du San's Yoo Hyun Sang, Kim Dokyun, Yoon Hee Seok, Yang Sea Hyung, Super Junior (Shindong, Leeteuk, Eunhyuk), etc.
95	2011-09-13	Boom, Noh Joo Hyun, SNSD (Sunny, Seohyun), Jeon Hye Bin, BMK, Baek Du San's Yoo Hyun Sang, Kim Dokyun, Yoon Hee Seok, Yang Sea Hyung, Super Junior (Shindong, Leeteuk, Eunhyuk), etc.
96	2011-09-20	Sung Si Kyung, Kara (Nicole, Jiyoung), Woohyun (Infinite), Jaurim, Kim Jo Han, Kim Hye Sun, Byeon Woo Min, Super Junior (Shindong, Leeteuk, Eunhyuk), etc.
97	2011-09-27	Sung Si Kyung, Kara (Nicole, Jiyoung), Woohyun (Infinite), Jaurim, Kim Jo Han, Kim Hye Sun, Byeon Woo Min, Super Junior (Shindong, Leeteuk, Eunhyuk), etc.
98	2011-10-04	Brown Eyed Girls (Narsha, Miryo), Hyun Jin Young, Garry, Choi Ran, Yu Hye Ri, Choi Soo Rin, Lee Jae Yoon (My Love By My Side), Kim Bo Mi, Yang Bae Chu, Super Junior (Shindong, Leeteuk, Eunhyuk), etc.
99	2011-10-11	Brown Eyed Girls (Narsha, Miryo), Hyun Jin Young, Garry, Choi Ran, Yu Hye Ri, Choi Soo Rin, Lee Jae Yoon (My Love By My Side), Kim Bo Mi, Yang Bae Chu, Super Junior (Shindong, Leeteuk, Eunhyuk), etc.
100	2011-10-18	Kara (Gyuri, Hara), Baby V.O.X. (Kim E-Z, Lee Hee Jin), Lee Kyung Sil, Kim Hyung Bum, Kim Sae Jin, Byeon Gi Su, etc.
101	2011-10-25	Kara (Gyuri, Hara), Baby V.O.X. (Kim E-Z, Lee Hee Jin), Lee Kyung Sil, Kim Hyung Bum, Kim Sae Jin, Byeon Gi Su, etc.
102	2011-11-01	Kim Hyun Joong, Jessica (SNSD), Yoon Se Ah, Kim Jang Hoon, Dana (CSJH), Clover (Eun Ji Won, Gilme), Kwanghee (ZE:A), Super Junior (Shindong, Leeteuk, Eunhyuk), etc.
103	2011-11-08	SNSD (Yoona, Yuri, Tiffany), Hongki (FT Island), Son Ho Young, Seo Kyung Seok, Song Chae Hwan, Kim Ji Hyun, Jin Seo Yeon, Sa Yoo Ri, Lee Byung Jin, etc.
104	2011-11-15	SNSD (Yoona, Yuri, Tiffany), Hongki (FT Island), Son Ho Young, Seo Kyung Seok, Song Chae Hwan, Kim Ji Hyun, Jin Seo Yeon, Sa Yoo Ri, Lee Byung Jin, etc.
105	2011-11-22	Wonder Girls, Psy, Lee Bon, Song Dae Kwan, Jang Jae In, Kim Jung Nam, Hwang Hye Young, Kim Won Hyo, Byeon Gi Su, Super Junior (Shindong, Leeteuk, Eunhyuk), Boom, etc.
106	2011-11-26	Wonder Girls, Psy, Lee Bon, Song Dae Kwan, Jang Jae In, Kim Jung Nam, Hwang Hye Young, Kim Won Hyo, Byeon Gi Su, Super Junior (Shindong, Leeteuk, Eunhyuk), Boom, etc.
107	2011-12-06	Shinhwa (Junjin, Andy), Trax (Jungmo, Jay), Yoon Do Hyun, Heo Jun, Seo In Young, Hye Eun Lee, Choi Phillip, Lee Jae Eun, Kim Eun Seo, Super Junior (Shindong, Eunhyuk), Boom, etc.
108	2011-12-13	Shinhwa (Junjin, Andy), Trax (Jungmo, Jay), Yoon Do Hyun, Heo Jun, Seo In Young, Hye Eun Lee, Choi Phillip, Lee Jae Eun, Kim Eun Seo, Super Junior (Shindong, Eunhyuk), Boom, etc.
109	2011-12-20	Kim Hyun Joo, IU, Sechang (B.o.M), Kim Yeon Joo, Lee Jung Jin, Ryu Tae Joon, Jung Juri, Boom, Super Junior (Leeteuk, Shindong, Eunhyuk), etc.
110	2011-12-27	Kim Hyun Joo, IU, Sechang (B.o.M), Kim Yeon Joo, Lee Jung Jin, Ryu Tae Joon, Jung Juri, Boom, Super Junior (Leeteuk, Shindong, Eunhyuk), etc.

=== 2012 ===
List of episodes in 2012 (episode 111–160)

Episode #	Broadcast Date	Guests
111	2012-01-03	Go Ara, Lee Chun Hee, Jung Sun Hee, Kim Chung, Kim Kyu Jong, Oh Sae Jung, Hong Hyun Hee, Yewon (Jewelry), Kwanghee, Boom, Super Junior (Leeteuk, Eunhyuk, Shindong), etc.
112	2012-01-10	Go Ara, Lee Chun Hee, Jung Sun Hee, Kim Chung, Kim Kyu Jong, Oh Sae Jung, Hong Hyun Hee, Yewon (Jewelry), Kwanghee, Boom, Super Junior (Leeteuk, Eunhyuk, Shindong), etc.
113	2012-01-17	Bora (Sistar), Seo Jun Young, Kim Min Hee, Ahn Jung Hoon, Kang Seung Hyun, Heo Cham, Jung So-Nyeo, Go Eun Ah, Mir (MBLAQ), Ahn Sun Young & Mother, etc.
114	2012-01-24	Bora (Sistar), Seo Jun Young, Kim Min Hee, Ahn Jung Hoon, Kang Seung Hyun, Heo Cham, Jung So-Nyeo, Go Eun Ah, Mir (MBLAQ), Ahn Sun Young & Mother, etc.
115	2012-01-31	Siwan (ZE:A), Lee Min Ho, Wang Bi Ho, Lee Yoon Seok, Im Ji Eun, Kim Yoon Kyoung, Choi Jin Hyuk, Chae Ri Na, Moon Hee Ok, Boom, Super Junior (Leeteuk, Eunhyuk, Shindong), etc.
116	2012-02-06	Siwan (ZE:A), Lee Min Ho, Wang Bi Ho, Lee Yoon Seok, Im Ji Eun, Kim Yoon Kyoung, Choi Jin Hyuk, Chae Ri Na, Moon Hee Ok, Boom, Super Junior (Leeteuk, Eunhyuk, Shindong), etc.
117	2012-02-14	Jisuk (Rainbow), Minah (Girl's Day), Bomi (APink), Subin (Dal Shabet), Yoon Jung Shin, Seo Ji Hye, Kim Boo Sun, Shin Da Eun, Kim Joo Hee, Kim Da Hyun, Kim Kyung Min, etc.
118	2012-02-21	Jisuk (Rainbow), Minah (Girl's Day), Bomi (APink), Subin (Dal Shabet), Yoon Jung Shin, Seo Ji Hye, Kim Boo Sun, Shin Da Eun, Kim Joo Hee, Kim Da Hyun, Kim Kyung Min, etc.
119	2012-02-28	Se7en, Seohyun (SNSD), miss A (Suzy, Min), K.Will, Park Eun Hye, Park Kyung Lim, Kim Hak Chul, Choi Harley, Lee Hyun Yi, Super Junior (Leeteuk, Eunhyuk, Shindong), Boom, etc.
120	2012-03-06	Se7en, Seohyun (SNSD), miss A (Suzy, Min), K.Will, Park Eun Hye, Park Kyung Lim, Kim Hak Chul, Choi Harley, Lee Hyun Yi, Super Junior (Leeteuk, Eunhyuk, Shindong), Boom, etc.
121	2012-03-11	2AM, Uee (After School), Lee Jang Woo, Park Ji Yoon, Jang Young Nam, Kim Ae Kyung, Choi Ji Yeon, Super Junior (Leeteuk, Eunhyuk, Shindong), Boom, etc.
122	2012-03-20	2AM, Uee (After School), Lee Jang Woo, Park Ji Yoon, Jang Young Nam, Kim Ae Kyung, Choi Ji Yeon, Super Junior (Leeteuk, Eunhyuk, Shindong), Boom, etc.
123	2012-03-27	BigBang, Se7en, 2NE1, Tablo, Psy, Gummy, etc.
124	2012-04-03	BigBang, Se7en, 2NE1, Tablo, Psy, Gummy, etc.
125	2012-04-10	Jung Yong Hwa (CN Blue), Hyorin (Sistar), Lee Jin Wook, Kim Ji Suk, Jang Na Ra, Kim Shin Young, Jung So Min, Song Eun Lee, Shin So Yeon, etc.
126	2012-04-17	Jung Yong Hwa (CN Blue), Hyorin (Sistar), Lee Jin Wook, Kim Ji Suk, Jang Na Ra, Kim Shin Young, Jung So Min, Song Eun Lee, Shin So Yeon, etc.
127	2012-04-24	Tiffany (SNSD), Lee Joon (MBLAQ), Ivy, Park Kyung Lim, Oh Yoon Ah, Han Ji Woo, Lee Hyun Jin, Seon Woo, Kim Hwan (announcer), Shin So Yeon, Kim Na Young, Super Junior (Leeteuk, Eunhyuk), Boom, etc.
128	2012-05-01	Tiffany (SNSD), Lee Joon (MBLAQ), Ivy, Park Kyung Lim, Oh Yoon Ah, Han Ji Woo, Lee Hyun Jin, Seon Woo, Kim Hwan (announcer), Shin So Yeon, Kim Na Young, Super Junior (Leeteuk, Eunhyuk), Boom, etc.
129	2012-05-08	Noh Sa Yeon, Yang Dong Geun, KPop Star contestants (Park Ji Min, Lee Ha Lee, Baek Ah Yeon), Lee Sung Mi, Jo Eun Suk, Dynamic Duo, Jang Dong Min, Super Junior (Leeteuk, Eunhyuk), Boom, etc.
130	2012-05-15	Noh Sa Yeon, Yang Dong Geun, KPop Star contestants (Park Ji Min, Lee Ha Lee, Baek Ah Yeon), Lee Sung Mi, Jo Eun Suk, Dynamic Duo, Jang Dong Min, Super Junior (Leeteuk, Eunhyuk), Boom, etc.
131	2012-05-22	IU, Kim Boa (Spica), Kang Seong Yeon, Kim Min, Lee Jong Seok, Chun Myung Hoon, Choi Yoon Young, Oh Chohee, Kim Young Chul, Super Junior (Leeteuk, Eunhyuk), Boom, etc.
132	2012-05-29	IU, Kim Boa (Spica), Kang Seong Yeon, Kim Min, Lee Jong Seok, Chun Myung Hoon, Choi Yoon Young, Oh Chohee, Kim Young Chul, Super Junior (Leeteuk, Eunhyuk), Boom, etc.
133	2012-06-05	Han Sun Hwa (Secret), Sung Gyu (Infinite), Kim Da Rae, Han Groo, Kim Yoo Mi, Jung Chang Woo, Kim Tae Gyun, Lee Su Hyuk, Super Junior (Leeteuk, Eunhyuk), Boom, etc.
134	2012-06-12	Han Sun Hwa (Secret), Sung Gyu (Infinite), Kim Da Rae, Han Groo, Kim Yoo Mi, Jung Chang Woo, Kim Tae Gyun, Lee Su Hyuk, Super Junior (Leeteuk, Eunhyuk), Boom, etc.
135	2012-06-19	Lee Ki Woo, Kim Bin Woo, Yoo Sae Yoon, etc.
136	2012-06-25	Lee Ki Woo, Kim Bin Woo, Yoo Sae Yoon, etc.
137	2012-07-03	Ye Eun (Wonder Girls), Jo Kwon (2AM), Wooyoung (2PM), Ye Ji Won, Bang Eun Hee, Jeong Jun (Tasty Life), Super Junior (Leeteuk, Eunhyuk), Boom, etc.
138	2012-07-10	Ye Eun (Wonder Girls), Jo Kwon (2AM), Wooyoung (2PM), Ye Ji Won, Bang Eun Hee, Jeong Jun (Tasty Life), Super Junior (Leeteuk, Eunhyuk), Boom, etc.
139	2012-07-17	Super Junior (Kyuhyun, Shindong), Victoria (f(x)), After School (Jung Ah, Lizzy), Lee Chung Ah, Nam, Kyung Joo, Jun Soo Kyung, Solbi, Park Ki Young, etc.
140	2012-07-24	Super Junior (Kyuhyun, Shindong), Victoria (f(x)), After School (Jung Ah, Lizzy), Lee Chung Ah, Nam, Kyung Joo, Jun Soo Kyung, Solbi, Park Ki Young, etc.
141	2012-08-14	Go Na Eun (Papaya), Bebe Migno, Super Junior (Leeteuk, Eunhyuk), etc.
142	2012-08-21	SHINee's Minho, f(x)'s Sulli, Lee Hyun-woo, ZE:A's Hwang Kwang Hee & Park Hyung-sik, Seo Joon Young & Kim Ji-won, Kim Jung Nah, Super Junior's Leeteuk & Eunhyuk, Boom, Han Hye-jin, Hong Seok-cheon, Hyunmi, Kim Jung-nan, Park Hyo-joo, Yang Se-hyung, Im Ho, Kim Yu-mi
143	2012-08-28	SHINee's Minho, f(x)'s Sulli, Lee Hyun-woo, ZE:A's Hwang Kwang Hee & Park Hyung-sik, Seo Joon Young & Kim Ji-won, Kim Jung Nah, Super Junior's Leeteuk & Eunhyuk, Boom, Han Hye-jin, Hong Seok-cheon, Hyunmi, Kim Jung-nan, Park Hyo-joo, Yang Se-hyung, Im Ho, Kim Yu-mi
144	2012-09-04	Hara & Seungyeon (Kara), Lee Joon (MBLAQ), Jo Min Soo, Lee Jung Jin, Kim Ki Duk, Kim Yeon Kyung, Leeteuk & Eunhyuk (Super Junior), Boom, etc.
145	2012-09-11	Hara & Seungyeon (Kara), Lee Joon (MBLAQ), Jo Min Soo, Lee Jung Jin, Kim Ki Duk, Kim Yeon Kyung, Leeteuk & Eunhyuk (Super Junior), Boom, etc.
146	2012-09-18	Lee Jihyun & Park Jung Ah (former members of Jewelry), Dasom (Sistar), Kim Ji Hoon, Kim Jang Hoon, Kang Ye Sol, Kim Jang Hoon, Leeteuk & Eunhyuk(Super Junior), Boom, etc.
147	2012-09-25	Lee Jihyun & Park Jung Ah (former members of Jewelry), Dasom (Sistar), Kim Ji Hoon, Kim Jang Hoon, Kang Ye Sol, Kim Jang Hoon, Leeteuk & Eunhyuk(Super Junior), Boom, etc.
148	2012-10-02	Sunhwa (Secret), Park Ki Woong, Shin So Yool, Hong Jong Hyun, Kim Jin Ah, Moon Hee Jun, Nancy Leng, Byun Ki Soo, etc.
149	2012-10-09	Suzy & Fei (Miss A), Oh In Hye, Oh Yeon Seo, Kim Yoo Jung, Cha Hwa Yeon, etc.
150	2012-09-25	Miss A's Suzy & Fei, MBLAQ's Mir, Byul, Oh In Hye, Oh Yeon Seo, Kim Yoo Jung, Cha Hwa Yeon, Kim Yoo Jung with Park Geon Tae, Boom, Super Junior's Eunhyuk
151	2012-10-23	Brown Eyed Girls' Ga In, The Great Sear Cast, Jewelry's Ye Won, APink's Jung Eun Ji, Ji Sung, Kim So Yun, Lee Yoon Ji, Yoo Ha Joon, Song Jong Gook, Super Junior's Leeteuk & Eunhyuk, Boom
152	2012-10-30	Brown Eyed Girls' Ga In, The Great Sear Cast, Jewelry's Ye Won, APink's Jung Eun Ji, Ji Sung, Kim So Yun, Lee Yoon Ji, Yoo Ha Joon, Song Jong Gook, Super Junior's Leeteuk & Eunhyuk, Boom
153	2012-11-06	Girls' Generation's Yoona, SHINee's Jonghyun & Taemin, Mighty Mouth's Sangchu, TVXQ's Yunho & Max Changmin, Super Junior's Leeteuk, Yesung, Eunhyuk & Shindong, Lee Jung-hyun, Lee Ki-chan, Park Min-ji, Boom, Lim Seong-min, Kim Se-ah
154	2012-11-13	Girls' Generation's Yoona, SHINee's Jonghyun & Taemin, Mighty Mouth's Sangchu, TVXQ's Yunho & Max Changmin, Super Junior's Leeteuk, Yesung, Eunhyuk & Shindong, Lee Jung-hyun, Lee Ki-chan, Park Min-ji, Boom, Lim Seong-min, Kim Se-ah
155	2012-11-20	Super Junior's Eunhyuk, Rainbow's Jisook, ZE:A's Kwanghee, Son Dambi, NU'EST's Ren
156	2012-11-27	Song Jihyo, Super Junior's Eunhyuk, Rainbow's Jisook, ZE:A's Kwanghee, Son Dambi, Shisandong Tiger, NU'EST's Ren
157	2012-12-04	Lee Sangyeob, Park Minha, Park Hyerim, Kim Soohyun, Super Junior's Eunhyuk, Rainbow's Jisook, ZE:A's Kwanghee, Myname's Insoo
158	2012-12-11	Cho Hye Ryun, Lee Eui Jeong, Park Min Ha (Park Chan Min's daughter), Hye Park, Lee Sang Yup, Yang Ik Joon, Kim So Hyun, Park Chan Min, Hwang Min Woo (Little Psy or Kid Psy), Cho Ji Hwan (Cho Hye Ryun's younger brother), Eunhyuk (Super Junior), Jisook (Rainbow), Kwanghee (ZE:A)
159	2012-12-18	Park Shin Hye & Yoon Shi Yoon, Go Kyung Pyo, MBLAQ Mir, 'Little Psy' Hwang Min Woo, Park Min Ha, Boom, Eunhyuk, etc.
160	2012-12-25	Park Shin Hye & Yoon Shi Yoon, Go Kyung Pyo, MBLAQ Mir, 'Little Psy' Hwang Min Woo, Park Min Ha, Boom, Eunhyuk, etc.

=== 2013 ===
List of episodes in 2013 (episode 161–166)

Episode #	Broadcast Date	Guests
161	2013-01-08	Baro & Sandeul (B1A4), Lee Yong Hyu, Yoo Ha Na, Kim Ha Na, Kim Jung Tae, Yoo Hyun Sang, Choi Hyun Hee, Kim Hyung Bum, Jung Ga Eun, Kim Jung Hwa, Park Shin Yang, Yewon (Jewelry)
162	2013-01-15	Baro & Sandeul (B1A4), Lee Yong Hyu, Yoo Ha Na, Kim Ha Na, Kim Jung Tae, Yoo Hyun Sang, Choi Hyun Hee, Kim Hyung Bum, Jung Ga Eun, Kim Jung Hwa, Park Shin Yang, Yewon (Jewelry)
163	2013-01-22	Baek Ji Young, Ji Eun (Secret), Jeong Ae Yeon, Park Sung Woong, Park Hyun Bin, Woo Yeon Suk, Fujii Mina, etc.
164	2013-01-29	Baek Ji Young, Ji Eun (Secret), Jeong Ae Yeon, Park Sung Woong, Park Hyun Bin, Woo Yeon Suk, Fujii Mina, etc.
165	2013-02-05	SNSD
166	2013-02-12	SNSD

== Awards ==
Year	Awards	Category	Nominee	Result	Ref
2009	SBS Entertainment Awards	Best TV Program	Strong Heart	Won	
2009	SBS Entertainment Awards	Netizen Best Popularity Award	Lee Seung-gi	Won	
2009	SBS Entertainment Awards	Best Newcomer	Boom (entertainer)	Won	
2009	SBS Entertainment Awards	Best Newcomer	Leeteuk	Won	
2009	SBS Entertainment Awards	Best Newcomer	Eunhyuk	Won	
2010	SBS Entertainment Awards	Top Excellence Award	Lee Seung-gi	Won	
2010	SBS Entertainment Awards	Netizen Best Popularity Award	Lee Seung-gi	Won	
2010	SBS Entertainment Awards	Multiple Talent Entertainer Award	Kim Hyo-jin	Won	
2010	SBS Entertainment Awards	Multiple Talent Entertainer Award	Kim Young-chul	Won	
2010	SBS Entertainment Awards	Best Writer	Kim Youn-young	Won	
2010	SBS Entertainment Awards	Best Newcomer	Shindong	Won	
2010	SBS Entertainment Awards	Grand Prize (Daesang)	Kang Ho-dong	Won	
2011	SBS Entertainment Awards	Best Entertainer Award (Talk Show Category)	Shindong	Won	
2011	SBS Entertainment Awards	Best Entertainer Award (Talk Show Category)	Jung Joo Ri	Won	
2011	SBS Entertainment Awards	Excellence Award (Talk Show Category)	Boom	Won	
2011	SBS Entertainment Awards	Excellence Award (Talk Show Category)	Leeteuk	Won	
2011	SBS Entertainment Awards	Excellence Program Award (Talk Show Category)	Strong Heart	Won	
2011	SBS Entertainment Awards	Top Excellence Award (Talk Show Category)	Lee Seung-gi	Won	
2011	SBS Entertainment Awards	Netizen Best Popularity Award	Lee Seung-gi	Won	
2012	SBS Entertainment Awards	Best Newcomer, MC category	Lee Dong-wook	Won	
2012	SBS Entertainment Awards	Best Couple Award	Lee Dong-wook & Shin Dong-yup	Won	

== Same-time Program ==
- KBS 《Moonlight Prince》
- KBS 《Kim Seung-woo's SeungSeungJang-gu》
- KBS 《Imagination plus》
- MBC 《PD Note》
- MBC 《100 minutes discussion》
