= Jung Chan-woo =

Jung Chan-woo (Korean: 정찬우) is a Korean name consisting of the family name Jung and the given name Chan-woo, and may also refer to:

- Jung Chan-woo (comedian) (born 1968), South Korean comedian
- Jung Chan-woo (singer) (born 1998), South Korean singer
