= 8 vs 1 =

- Title card
- Starring: Shin Dong-yup; Kim Hee-chul; Jung Chanwoo; Shim Eun-jin; Sol Bi
- Country of origin: South Korea
- Original language: Korean
- No. of episodes: 13

Original release
- Network: SBS
- Release: January 21 – April 21, 2008

8 vs 1 (Korean: 대결 8대1) was a South Korean television show distributed by SBS. The show was aired every Monday at 23:15. It took over the timeslot left vacant when Yashimmanman was canceled.

== Host ==
- Shin Dong-yup
- Jung Chan-woo
- Kim Hee-chul (EP. 1-8, 10)
- Shim Eun-jin (EP. 1-6)
- Solbi (EP. 7-13)

== Format ==
Each week, the 4 MCs and 4 guest celebrity panelists try to guess the answers given by 50 people/couples who answered a survey. If they aren't able to guess all the answers given, the task is passed onto a contestant who has to guess at the answers for prize money.

Episode 1

The panelists guess at the answers given by a survey of 50 people by picking up a placard with their own pictures on it or sitting on a whoopee cushion that is moving on a conveyor belt on a low table that they are sitting around. The panelists are allowed to make up to 50 guesses before they make 8 incorrect guesses. If they get a wrong answer, a strong gust of wind blows in their face. After 8 incorrect guesses, a contestant is given an opportunity. All they need is to find one correct answer within 60 seconds and they win $1000.

Episode 2-3 & 4 (second half)

The panelists guess at the answers given by a survey of 50 people by picking up a lollipop or sitting on a whoopee cushion that is moving on a conveyor belt on a low table that they are sitting around. The panelists are allowed to make up to 40 guesses until they make 8 incorrect guesses. If they get a wrong answer, a strong gust of wind blows under their skirts. After 8 incorrect guesses, a contestant is given an opportunity. They only have 8 changes to guess a correct answer and they win $1000.

Episode 4 (first half) & 5-9

The panelists guess at the answers given by a survey of 50 people. The panelists are allowed to make as many guesses as there are answers. After their allotted number of guesses, a contestant is given an opportunity. They are given 8 chances to guess the correct answers from whatever number of answers that are left unanswered. For each correct answer, they are given $1000 for a total of up to $8000. This episode instituted a new method of guessing at an answer, that of going up to a small cube podium and hitting a buzzer. There is no penalty for guessing the wrong answer.

Episode 10-13

The show is separated into two segments. The first part is called [star Straight Talk! GO? STOP!] where they show what the 50 people they surveyed had to say about 2 of the 4 guests on that week. The comments range from polite to mean and are given levels with the first level, the polite comments, being revealed first. The guest is given an opportunity to respond to each comment. Any time the guest doesn't feel comfortable with the comments, they can put a stop to it by holding up a stop sign. The second part is a survey question like before, but rather than having to guess all the answers, they reveal all the answers EXCEPT one peculiar or odd one out. The panelists are divided into two teams: MC team and Guest Team. One side is given the answer and has to give hints to the other side to help them guess the answer. If they are able to correctly guess the answer, they are given $1000 to donate to a charity of their choice. If they aren't able to correctly guess the answer, the contestant who gave the original answer is given $1000.

== List of episodes ==
In the ratings below, the highest rating for the show will be in red, and the lowest rating for the show will be in blue.

Episode #	Air Date	Guest(s)	AGB Nielsen ratings
1	January 21, 2008	Taeyeon, Kim Won-hee, Wheesung, Kim Mi-ryeo	6.6%
2	January 28, 2008	Alex Chu, Solbi, Han Young, Kim Saeng-min	6.4%
3	February 4, 2008	Kim Young-chul, Woo Seung-min, Jung Ju-ri, Oh Ji-eun	8%
4	February 11, 2008	Kim Young-chul, Woo Seung-min, Jung Ju-ri, Oh Ji-eun; Shoo, Noh Sa-yeon, Kim Tae-gyun, Jo Young-goo	8.3%
5	February 18, 2008	Kim Chang-ryul, Solbi, Jang Young-ran, LJ	6.6%
6	February 25, 2008	Shoo, Noh Sa-yeon, Kim Tae-gyun, Jo Young-goo; Park Yoo-chun, Kim Jae-joong, Judy Jung-hwa Kang, Boom	8.8%
7	March 3, 2008	Hong Seo-beom, Jo Gap-kyung, Byun Jin-sub, Mithra Jin	5.6%
8	March 10, 2008	Jae-eun Lee, Yoo Chae-yeong, Song Eun-i, Han-suk Kim	5.9%
9	March 17, 2008	Geum Bo-ra, Kim Heung-gook, Park Jung-ah, Sang-cheol Park; Subbing for Heechul: Eunhyuk, Kim Ki-bum	7.1%
10	March 24, 2008	Kim Ga-yeon, Lee Han-wi, Tae Jin-ah, Woo Seung-min	7.4%
11	March 31, 2008	Noh Sa-yeon, Moon Hee-joon, Ha Chun-hwa, Kim Young-chul; Subbing for Heechul: Shindong	7.4%
12	April 14, 2008	Song Eun-i, Ock Joo-hyun, Jang Na-ra, Geum Bo-ra, Kim Jung-min	6.3%
13	April 21, 2008	Song Eun-i, Andy, Hwayobi, Park Sang-min, Kim Jung-min	7%
