= Chan-woo =

- Hangul: 찬우
- RR: Chanu
- MR: Ch'anu

Chan-woo is a Korean given name.

People with this name include:

- Jung Chan-woo (comedian) (born 1968), South Korean comedian
- Jung Chan-woo (singer) (born 1998), South Korean singer, member of iKON

== See also ==
- List of Korean given names
