= Cultwo Show =

South Korean radio show

Cultwo (Kim Tae-gyun )Show
- Genre: Drama, talk, music
- Running time: 2 hours, Mondays - Sundays, 2:00pm-4:00pm, KST
- Country of origin: South Korea
- Home station: SBS Power FM
- Hosted by: Jung Chan-woo, Kim Tae-gyun (Cultwo)
- Created by: SBS Power FM
- Original release: May 1, 2006
- Website: Cultwo Show

Cultwo Show (Korean: 두시탈출 컬투쇼; lit. Escape at 2pm, Cultwo Show) is a South Korean radio show hosted by Jung Chan-woo and Kim Tae-gyun (Cultwo) on SBS Power FM (frequency 107.7 MHz) since May 1, 2006 from 2:00 pm to 4:00 pm. From the beginning the broadcast is being conducted in front of the audience.

Unlike other radio stations that proceed quietly and introduce songs, they have become very popular due to the candid and ingenious stories and original corners. Recently the audience has been engaged in various corners. This is the program that is currently ranked # 1 in radio listening.

== Awards and nominations ==
Year	Award	Category	Result
2007	SBS Entertainment Awards	Star of the Year Award (Radio category)	Won
2010	Korean National Assembly Award	Radio show of the Year	Won
2012	SBS Entertainment Awards	Radio DJ Award	Won
2013	SBS Entertainment Awards	PD Awards: Radio Programs	Won
2014	SBS Entertainment Awards	High Excellence Award (Talk Show category)	Won
