= Heyne (singer) =

South Korean singer

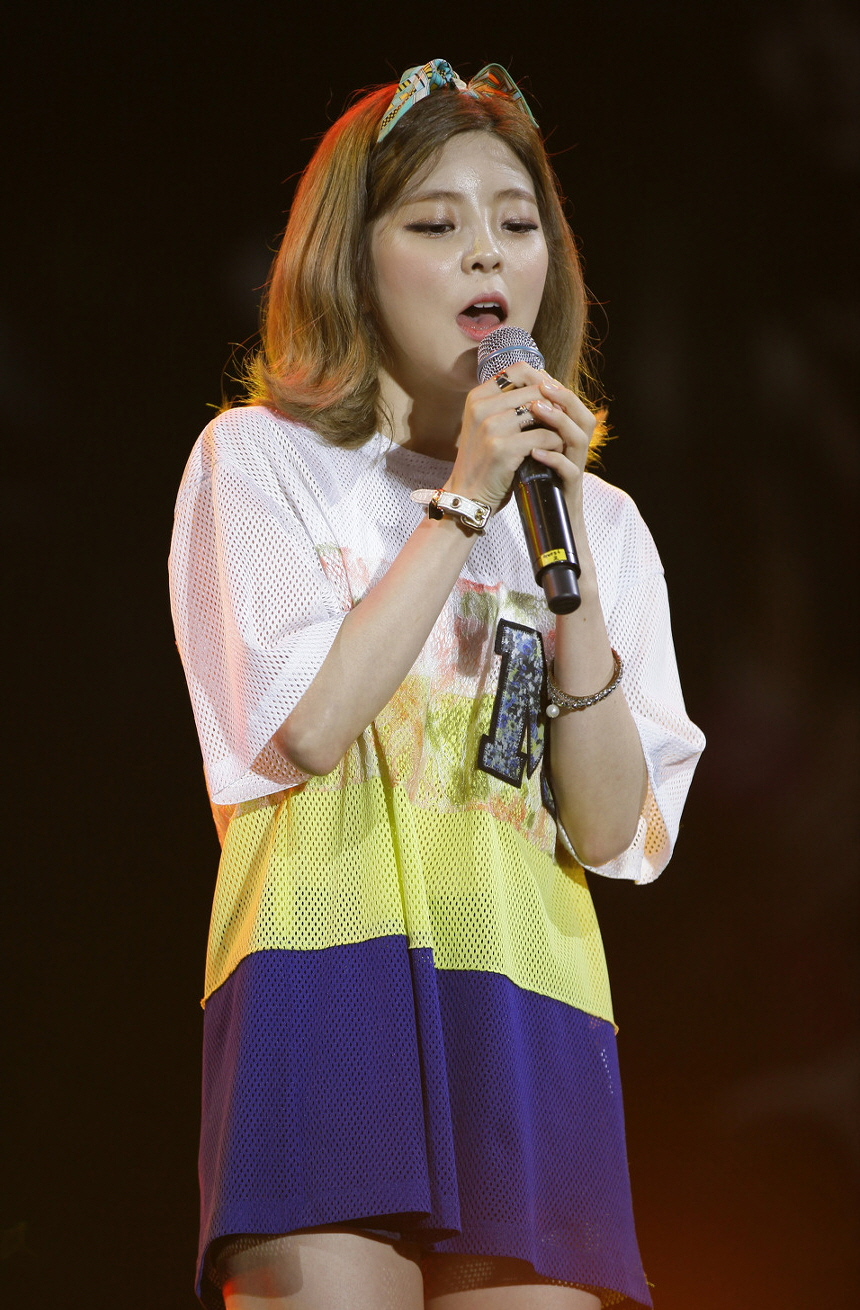
- Heyne in 2016

Background information
- Born: June 3, 1992 (age 34); Seoul, South Korea
- Genre: K-pop
- Years active: 2013–present
- Labels: Crescendo Music; Wellmade Yedang; Most Culture
- Website: Official website at the Wayback Machine (archived 2018-07-24)

Kim Hye-in (Korean: 김혜인, born June 3, 1992), known by her stage name Heyne (혜이니), is a South Korean singer and entertainer. She debuted in 2013 with the single, "Different."

== Discography ==
=== Singles ===
Title	Year	Peak chart positions	Sales (DL)	Album
Title	Year	KOR	Sales (DL)	Album
As lead artist
"Different" (달라)	2013	—	N/A	Non-album single
"Love007"	2013	—	N/A	Non-album single
"The Law Of The City" (도시의 법칙)	2014	—	N/A	Non-album single
"Red Lie" (새빨간 거짓말)	2014	—	KOR: 20,658+	Non-album single
"My Heart" (내맘이)	2015	—	N/A	Non-album single
"Love Cells" (연애세포)	2016	—	N/A	Non-album single
"Insomnia" (잠이 오지 않아)	2018	—	N/A	Non-album single
"Good Luck"	2021	—	N/A	Non-album single
"Run To You"	2022	—	N/A	Non-album single
"reminiscences"	2023	—	N/A	Non-album single
Collaborations
"Duet" (with Benji of B.I.G)	2016	—	N/A	Non-album single
"Love Is Blind" (with Minsoo)	2017	—	N/A	Non-album single
Soundtrack appearances
"Don't" (이러지마)	2014	—	N/A	Let's Eat OST Part 5
"5 Minutes"	2014	—	N/A	Dad For Rent OST
"Shall We Go"	2015	—	N/A	Let's Eat With My Friend OST
"Trust Me" (날 믿어요)	2015	—	N/A	Sweet Home, Sweet Honey OST Part 1
"Loving You"	2017	—	N/A	Borg Mom OST Part 9
"—" denotes releases that did not chart.

== Filmography ==
=== Television (drama) ===
Year	Program	Network	Notes/Ref.
2014–2015	Schoolgirl Detectives	JTBC	Supporting role
2016	Love at the Tip of the Tongue	Youku	Main role

=== Television (variety) ===
Year	Program	Network	Notes/Ref.
2013	Winning Show	SBS MTV	Host (ep. 1-11)
2014–2016	Chart Folio	ETN	Host (ep. 73-181)
2015	Off to School	JTBC	Cast member (ep. 66-68)
2016	King of Mask Singer	MBC	Contestant (ep. 53)
