= Cultwo =

South Korean comedy duo

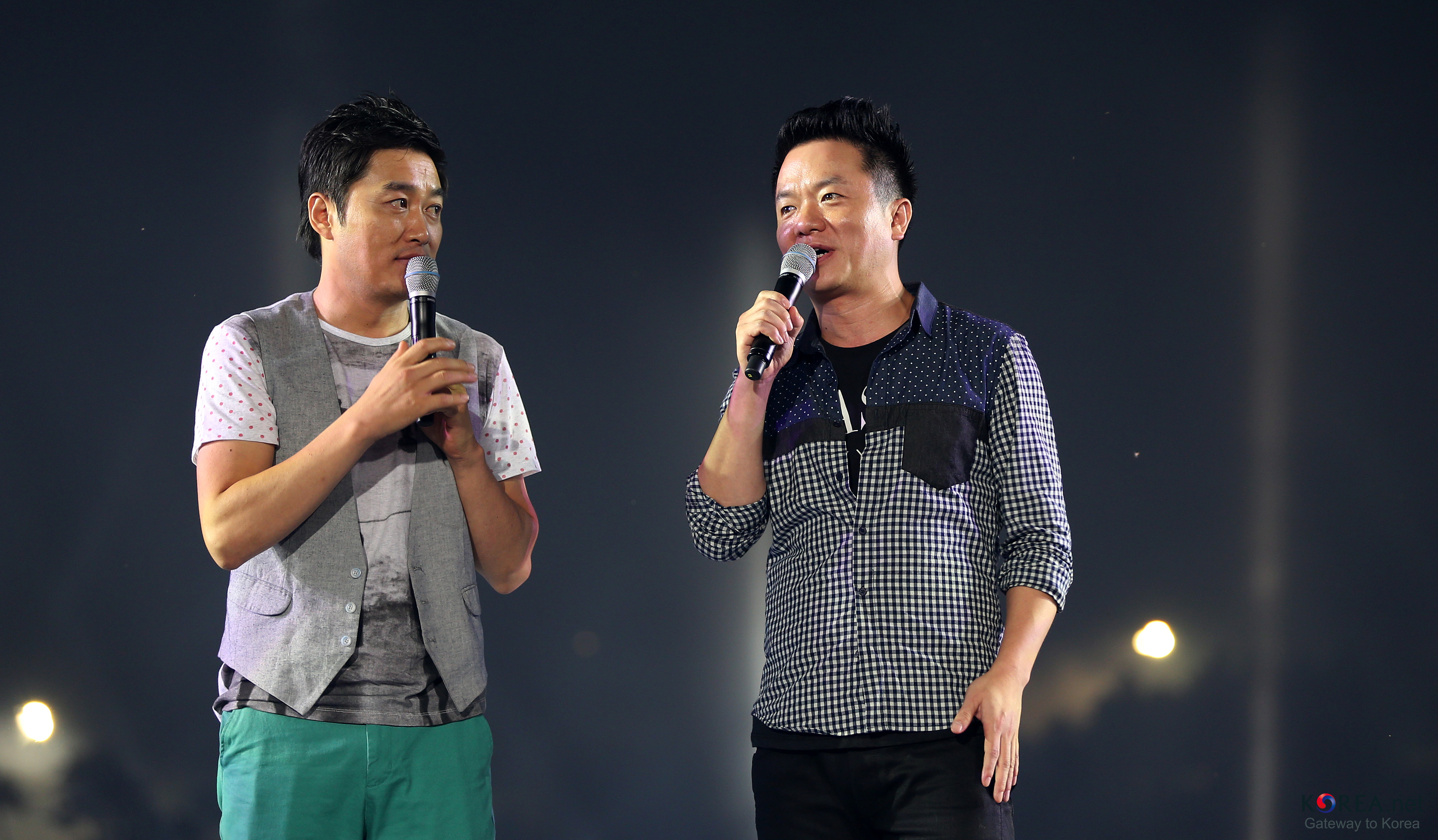
- Cultwo in 2013

Comedy career
- Years active: 1994–present
- Members: Jung Chan-woo; Kim Tae-gyun
- Former members: Jung Seong-han

Cultwo (Korean: 컬투) is a South Korean comedy duo consisting of Jung Chan-woo and Kim Tae-gyun. Formed in 1994 as Cult Triple, in 2002, Jung Seong-han left the team. After which, Chan-woo and Tae-gyun renamed the team the current name. Their syndicated talk radio show Cultwo Show, airs via the SBS Power FM since 2006.

They appeared with Kim Tae-gyun's son, Kim Bum-jun, in Episode 20 of Roommate Season 2. Kim Tae-gyun revealed that since his son watches Roommate every other day, so he decided to make an appearance on the show. After they appeared on the show, Kim Tae-gyun shared that he longs for his deceased mother, who died in 2014 due to cancer. Kim Bum-jun is a fan of GOT7's Jackson.

== Awards and nominations ==
Year	Award	Category	Nominated work	Result
2005	41st Baeksang Arts Awards	Best Variety Performer - Male	People Looking for a Laugh	Won
2011	KBS Entertainment Awards	Excellence Award	Hello!	Won
2012	KBS Entertainment Awards	Excellence Award	Hello Counselor	Won
2012	SBS Entertainment Awards	Radio DJ Award	Cultwo Show	Won
2014	SBS Entertainment Awards	Excellence Award	Cultwo Show	Won
2021	Brand of the Year Awards	Radio DJ	Cultwo	Won
