= Kim Tae-gyun (comedian) =

South Korean comedian, actor and singer

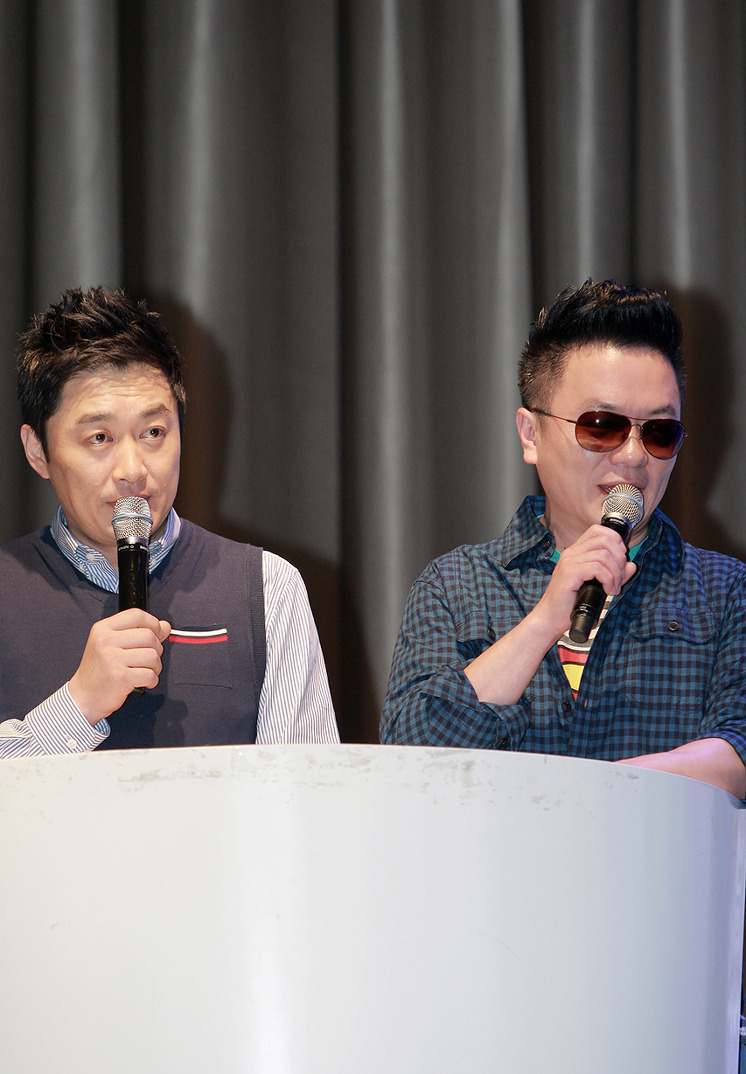
- Jung Chan-woo (left) and Kim (right) in 2014
- Born: September 16, 1972 (age 54); South Korea
- Spouse: Lee Ji-young
- Children: 1

Comedy career
- Years active: 1993–present
- Medium: Stand-up, television
- Genres: Observational, Sketch, Wit, Parody, Slapstick, Dramatic, Sitcom

Kim Tae-gyun (Korean: 김태균; Hanja: 金泰均; born September 19, 1972), is a South Korean comedian, actor and singer. He is member of comedy duo Cultwo. His syndicated talk radio show Cultwo Show, airs via the SBS Power FM since 2006.

== Ambassadorship ==
- Public relations ambassador of Seoul Energy Fund (2020–2022)

== State honors ==
Name of country, year given, and name of honor
| Country | Organization | Year | Honor or Award | Ref. |
|---|---|---|---|---|
| South Korea | Korean Popular Culture and Arts Awards (Note: Honors are given at the Korean Popular Culture and Arts Awards, arranged by the Korea Creative Content Agency and hosted by the Ministry of Culture, Sports and Tourism. They are awarded to those who have contributed to the arts and South Korea's pop culture.) | 2023 | Prime Minister's Commendation | |
