= Jung Chan-woo (comedian) =

South Korean comedian, actor and singer

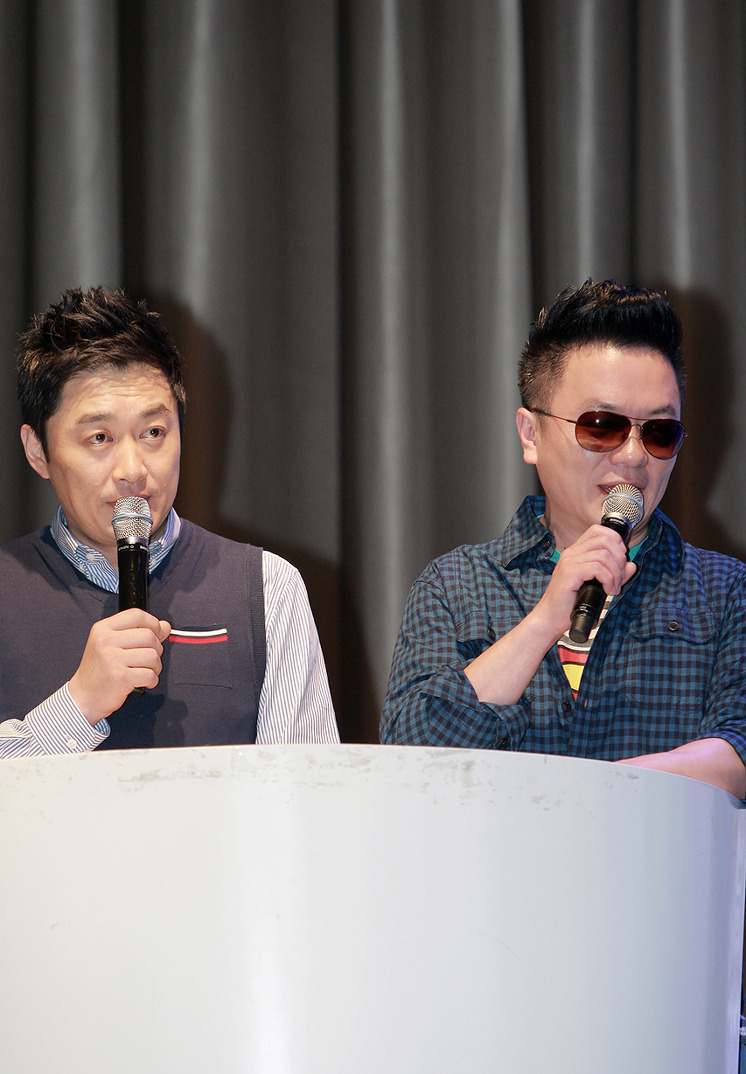
- Jung (left) and Kim Tae-gyun (right)
- Born: February 28, 1968 (age 58); South Korea

Comedy career
- Years active: 1991–2018
- Medium: Stand-up, television
- Genres: Observational, Sketch, Wit, Parody, Slapstick, Dramatic, Sitcom

Jung Chan-woo (Korean: 정찬우; Hanja: 鄭燦宇; born February 28, 1968), is a South Korean comedian, actor and singer. He is member of comedy duo Cultwo. His syndicated talk radio show Cultwo Show, airs via the SBS Power FM since 2006.

== Filmography ==
=== Television ===
Year	Title	Role	Remark
2005	Can Love Be Refilled?	Kang Dong-woo	Main role
2008	On Air	fortune-teller	
2008	8 vs 1	MC	
2014	The Idle Mermaid		
2015	The Family is Coming		
2015	A Girl Who Sees Smells	Wang Ja-bang	
2015	The Producers	himself	cameo
