= Vitamin (TV program) =

- Genre: Variety
- Presented by: Yoon Da-hoon; Jung Eun-ah; Kang Byung-kyu; Jun Hyun-moo; Kim Yong-man; Lee Hwi-jae; Eun Ji-won; Park Eun-young; Jeong Ji-won; Kim Tae-hoon
- Country of origin: South Korea
- Original language: Korean
- No. of episodes: 664

Production
- Production locations: Seoul, South Korea
- Running time: 65 minutes
- Production company: SM C&C

Original release
- Network: KBS
- Release: June 29, 2003 – March 9, 2017

Vitamin (Korean: 비타민) was a South Korean variety show, which airs on KBS2, KBS's cable and satellite network for comedy and variety shows. The show had several line-ups of hosts, including Yoon Da-hoon, Jung Eun-ah, Kang Byung-kyu, Jun Hyun-moo, Kim Yong-man, Lee Hwi-jae, Eun Ji-won, Park Eun-young, Jeong Ji-won, and Kim Tae-hoon. The show ended its run on March 9, 2017 after 14 years.

== Format ==
The show relies on a variety program format and aims to contribute to the development and improvement of the quality of lives of citizens by providing valuable information along with entertainment. The show discusses recent and relevant topics such as aging prevention, sex, the truth about Adam and Eve, and the birth cycle. Through a trilogy, or even a tetralogy, the program attempts to approach these topics profoundly and systematically, with a new point of view and satisfy viewer's curiosities. There are panels of medical experts and guests who talk about the set topic with the hosts and learn new ways to be healthy.

== List of episodes ==
=== 2003 ===
List of episodes (2003)

Episode	Air date	Title	Featured guests
1	June 29	-	-
2	July 6	-	-
3	July 13	-	-
4	July 20	-	-
5	July 27	-	-
6	August 3	-	-
7	August 10	-	-
8	August 17	-	-
9	August 24	-	-
10	August 31	-	-
11	September 7	-	-
12	September 21	-	-
13	September 28	-	-
14	October 5	-	-
15	October 12	-	-
16	October 19	-	-
17	October 26	-	-
18	November 2	-	-
19	November 9	-	-
20	November 16	-	-
21	November 23	-	-
22	November 30	-	-
23	December 7	-	-
24	December 14	-	-
25	December 21	-	-
26	December 28	-	-

=== 2004 ===
List of episodes (2004)

Episode	Air date	Title	Featured guests
27	January 4	-	-
28	January 11	-	-
29	January 18	-	-
30	January 25	-	-
31	February 1	-	-
32	February 8	-	-
33	February 15	-	-
34	February 22	-	-
35	February 29	-	-
36	March 7	-	-
37	March 14	-	-
38	March 21	-	-
39	March 28	-	-
40	April 4	-	-
41	April 11	-	-
42	April 18	-	-
43	April 25	-	-
44	May 2	-	-
45	May 9	-	-
46	May 16	-	-
47	May 23	-	-
48	May 30	-	-
49	June 6	-	-
50	June 13	-	-
51	June 20	-	-
52	June 27	Thyroid	Park Jung-ah, Im Ye-jin
53	July 4	Voice	Lee Hyun-woo (born 1966), Yoon Jong Shin
54	July 11	Sweat	Ahn Jae-hwan, Choi Hyeon-ho
55	July 18	I'm afraid of exposure! Varicose Veins	-
56	July 25	Liver	Kim Jong-min, Son Ji-chang
57	August 1	How to handle an emergency situation	Jo Eun-sook, Le Kwang-ki (actor)
58	August 8	Emergency Preparedness	Jo Eun-sook, Le Kwang-ki (actor)
59	August 22	Osteoporosis	Kim Se-hwan, UN (band)
60	September 5	Sex	-
61	September 12	Star Star Health	Hwang Shin-hye
62	September 19	Contraception	Hwang Shin-hye
63	October 3	Pregnancy and Infertility	-
64	October 10	Birth of Life - Myth	-
65	October 17	Cancer Birth Heritage	-
66	October 24	Postpartum Health	Ji Sang-ryeol, Iconiq
67	October 31	Vitamins	Kim Hyun-jung
68	November 7	Dietary Fiber & Lactic Acid Bacteria	Insooni
69	November 14	Mineral (nutrient)	Lee Soo-young
70	November 21	Essential amino acids	Lee Seung-chul
71	November 28	Successful Aging - Women	-
72	December 5	Successful Aging - Men	Kim Jong-min
73	December 12	Brain Aging - Stress	-
74	December 19	Aging - Skin, Muscle, Bone	-
75	December 26	End of Year Special	-

=== 2005 ===
List of episodes (2005)

Episode	Air date	Title	Featured guests
75			
76			
77			
78			
79			
80			
81			
82			
83			
84			
85			
86			
87			
88			
89			
90			
91			
92			
93			
94			
95			
96			
97			
98			
99			
100			
101			
102			
103			
104			
105			
106			
107	August 14		Heechul (Super Junior)
108	August 21		
109	August 28		
110	September 4		
111	September 11		
112	September 25		
113	October 2		
114	October 9		
115	October 16		
116	October 23		
117	October 30		
118	November 6		
119	November 13		
120	November 20		
121	November 27		
122	December 4		
123	December 11		
124	December 18		
125	December 25		

=== 2006 ===
List of episodes (2006)

Episode	Air date	Title	Featured guests

=== 2007 ===
List of episodes (2007)

Episode	Air date	Title	Featured guests

=== 2008 ===
List of episodes (2008)

Episode	Air date	Title	Featured guests

=== 2009 ===
List of episodes (2009)

Episode	Air date	Title	Featured guests

=== 2010 ===
List of episodes (2010)

Episode	Air date	Title	Featured guests

=== 2011 ===
List of episodes (2011)

Episode	Air date	Title	Featured guests

=== 2012 ===
List of episodes (2012)

Episode	Air date	Title	Featured guests
	April 5		Huh Gak
448	August 8		Sori, Jang Wooyoung (2PM), G.NA, Yoon Hyung-bin, Jo Eun-sook
464	December 19	End-of-Year Health Watch Special	Sunggyu of Infinite
465	December 26	Hereditary Cancer	Kim Jong-gook, Jo Hyang-ki, Bae Ki-sung, Cho Min-hee, Chun Myung-hoon, Lee Jong-won, Sonya

=== 2013 ===
List of episodes (2013)

Episode	Air date	Title	Featured guests	Notes
466	January 2	2013 New Year's Special: Genetic Illnesses	Park Gang-sung, Paeng Hyun-sook, Kim Jung-ryul, Jeon Won-ju, Kim So-ri, Jung Jae-yoon, Hwang Ki-sun	
467	January 9	2013 New Year's Special: Health Plans - Males	Huh Gak, Bae Ki-sung, Park Wan-kyu, Kim Kyung-jin, Kim Hak-rae	
468	January 16	2013 New Year's Special: Health Plans - Females	Hyomin (T-ara), Oh Jeong-yeon, Lee Hyeon-kyung, Lee Seong-mi, Lee Su-na	
469	January 23	New Year's Health Plans: Dieting	Taru Salminen, JeA (Brown Eyed Girls), Brian Joo, Hong Kyung-min, Han Yeong, Jo Se-ho, Kwon Mi-jin	
470	January 30	Allgeries	Choi Byeong-seo, Kang Min-hyuk (CNBLUE), Kim Sung-kyung, Jeon Soo-kyung, Seo Hyo-myung, Han Min-kwan, Park Hye-kyung	
471	February 6	Special Feature: World Health Food	Annabel, Christina Confalonieri, Ida Daussy, Robert Holley, Enes Kaya, Bronwyn Mullen, Sam Hammington	
472	February 13	Nutrition Conditions	4Minute (Gayoon, Jiyoon), Park Jeong-hak, Yoon Young-mi, Kim Jung-ryul, Inati (DMTN), Jung Dong-ha, Park Hyun-bin	
473	February 20	Warning Voices	Jeong Jong-cheol, Han Jun-hee, Kang Jin, Hong Seung-ok, Hong Won-bin, Sistar (Hyolyn, Bora)	
474	February 27	Expiry Dates and Mold	Lim Hyeok-pil, Jeong Ga-eun, Jeon Seong-ae, Sunwoo Yong-nyeo, Minha, Shin Yong-jae, Park Ji-hyun	
475	March 6	Colds Aren't Infectious	Park Soo-rim, Lee Yun-seong, Park Wan-kyu, Ji Seung-hyun, Oh Eon-jong, Choi Hee, Kim Kyung-jin	
476	March 13	Golden Time	Oh Eun-yeong, Kim Han-seok, Cho Min-hee, Kim Hyun-chul, Han Yeong, Jo Kwon (2AM), Taemin (Shinee)	
477	March 20	Lipolysis	Kim Ji-hyun, Im Sung-min, Park Joon-hyung, Oh Mi-yeon, Park Na-rae, Soohyun (U-KISS), Noh Woo-jin	
478	March 27	Jeju-do		
479	April 3	Dementia	Kim Soo-yong, Jung Su-ra, Choi Jin-hee, Lee Jung-sup, Soohyun (Sunny Days), K.Will, Hong Jin-young	Jung Eun-ah and Kim Yong-man's last episode as hosts. Kim Yong-man is absent. Alex Chu replaces him.
480	April 10	When My Stomach Hurts	Won Mi-yeon, Park Jun-gyu, Yoon Young-mi, Kim Dong-sung, Lee Sang-byuk, Lee Hae-ri & Kang Min-kyung (Davichi)	Lee Hwi-jae, Park Eun-young and Eun Ji-won's first episode as hosts.
481	April 17	Stroke	Fixed: Lee Jung-sup, Lee Hye-jung, Kim Na-young; Non-fixed: Jeong Jong-cheol & Hwang Kyu-lim, Secret (Hyosung, Hana), Shim Jin-hwa	Lee Jung-sup, Lee Hye-jung and Kim Na-young's first episode as fixed panellists.
482	April 24	Breast Cancer	Fixed: Lee Jung-sup, Lee Hye-jung, Kim Na-young; Non-fixed: Hong Seok-cheon, Kim Hyeong-ja, Teen Top (Chunji, Niel), Kim Mi-yeon	
483	May 1	Diabetes and Hair Loss	Fixed: Lee Jung-sup, Lee Hye-jung, Kim Na-young; Non-fixed: Kim Hak-rae, Park Hyun-bin, Taru Salminen, Yoon Sung-ho, Park Hwi-sun,	
484	May 8	Osteoarthritis	Fixed: Lee Jung-sup, Lee Hye-jung, Kim Na-young; Non-fixed: Kim Hye-yeon, Park Joon-hyung, T-ara N4 (Hyomin, Jiyeon), Kim Byung-chan	
485	May 15	Self-massage VS Masseur, Housewives' Depression, and Food Inspections	Fixed: Lee Jung-sup, Lee Hye-jung, Kim Na-young; Non-fixed: Robert Holley, Seo In-guk, Kim Jin, Jeong Kyung-mi, 4Minute (Gayoon, Jiyoon)	
486	May 22	Lemon Detox VS Juice Detox, Thyroid Cancer, and Honey	Fixed: Lee Jung-sup, Lee Hye-jung, Kim Na-young; Non-fixed: Hong Seo-beom, Lee Pa-ni, 2PM (Taecyeon, Nichkhun, Wooyoung)	
487	May 29	Stomach Vitamins & How to Use Smart Nutrition	Fixed: Lee Jung-sup, Lee Hye-jung, Kim Na-young; Non-fixed: Lee Jung-min, Yoo Hyun-sang, Byeon Gi-su, Kim Bo-kyung, Lee Ki-chan	
488	June 5	Pregnancy	Fixed: Lee Jung-sup, Lee Hye-jung, Kim Na-young; Non-fixed: Kim Hyun-chul, Do Kyung-wan, Han Min-kwan, Jo Hyang-ki, Lee Jung-soo	Lee Jung-sup's last episode as a fixed panellist.
489	June 12	Colo-rectal Cancer	Fixed: Lee Hye-jung, Kim Na-young; Non-fixed: Kim Jung-ryul, Hwang Ki-sun, Baek Chung-kang, Byeon Gi-su, Kim Ji-hyun, Kim Kyung-jin	
490	June 19	Tooth Health	Fixed: Lee Hye-jung, Kim Na-young; Non-fixed: Lee Sook-yeong, MBLAQ (G.O, Lee Joon), Jang Min-ho, Kim Hyeon-tae, Park Wan-kyu	
491	June 26	Female Urinary Disorders	Fixed: Lee Hye-jung, Kim Na-young, Byeon Gi-su; Non-fixed: Kim Ae-kyung, Kim Ji-sun, Lee Bong-won, Kim Jung-min, Bae Yeon-jeong	Byeon Gi-su's first episode as a fixed panellist.
492	July 3	Summer Diseases	Fixed: Lee Hye-jung, Kim Na-young, Byeon Gi-su; Non-fixed: Sistar (Bora, Soyou), Robert Holley, Park Hwi-sun, Jo Gap-gyeong	
493	July 10	Diet: Attack of Obesity (Gag Concert Special Feature)	Fixed: Lee Hye-jung, Kim Na-young, Byeon Gi-su; Non-fixed: Kim Su-yeong, Kim Jun-hyun, Kim Min-kyung, Yoo Min-sang, Kim Ji-ho	
494	July 17	Genetic Disease: Mother-Daughter Special	Fixed: Lee Hye-jung, Kim Na-young, Byeon Gi-su; Non-fixed: Ko Jun-yeong (Lee Hye-jung's daughter), Jo Hye-run & Choi Bok-sun, Um Aing-ran & Kang Su-hwa, Kim Jae-kyung & Kim Eunjin, Kim Hye-yeon} & Lee Yeong-hui	Guests brought their mothers/daughters along to the show.
495	July 24	Invigorating Food Special	Fixed: Lee Hye-jung, Kim Na-young, Byeon Gi-su; Non-fixed: Hong Jin-young, Lee Ji-ae, Oh Mi-yeon, Kim Jung-ryul, Kim Hak-rae	
496	July 31	The Enemy of Diets: Carbohydrates Addiction	Fixed: Lee Hye-jung, Kim Na-young; Non-fixed: Lee Seung-shin, Shin Ji, Park Hyun-bin, A-Jax (Seungyeop, Jaehyung), Park Hwa-seung (Yurisangja)	Byeon Gi-su is absent.
497	August 7	Hwa-byung	Fixed: Lee Hye-jung, Kim Na-young, Byeon Gi-su; Non-fixed: Chun Myung-hoon, Jeon Won-ju, Ahn So-young, Shin Young-il, Kim Bo-hwa,	
498	August 14	Hypertension	Fixed: Lee Hye-jung, Kim Na-young, Byeon Gi-su; Non-fixed: Bae Han-sung, Min Ji-young, Kim Jong-min, Moon Young-mi, Skarf (Hana, Jenny)	
499	August 21	Disc Herniation	Fixed: Lee Hye-jung, Kim Na-young, Byeon Gi-su; Non-fixed: Park Jun-gyu, Clara, Lee Seong-mi, Wink, Teen Top (Niel, Ricky)	
500	August 28	500th Episode Special: 10 Years of Peace! 10 More Years to Live! Reputation	Fixed: Lee Hye-jung, Kim Na-young, Byeon Gi-su; Non-fixed: Haeeunlee, Jo Hye-ryun, Kim Hyun-chul, Seol Seo-hyun, KARA (Hara, Seungyeon)	
501	September 4	Intermittent Fasting	Fixed: Lee Hye-jung, Kim Na-young, Byeon Gi-su; Non-fixed: Lee Yun-seong, Jeong Kyung-mi, BEAST (Yang Yo-seob, Lee Gi-kwang), Kim Jun-hee, Bae Ki-sung	
502	September 11	Shingles	Fixed: Lee Hye-jung, Kim Na-young, Byeon Gi-su; Non-fixed: Lee Sang-byuk, Choi Hui, Ahn Ji-hwan, Sonya, Moon Chun-sik	
503	September 18	Chuseok Special: Emergency Illnesses	Fixed: Lee Hye-jung, Kim Na-young; Non-fixed: Heo Kyung-hwan, Shin Bong-sun, Son Jun-ho and Kim So-hyun, Ko Min-hwan, Choi Jung-won & Jang Chang-sook, Bae Ki-sung	Kim Na-young's last episode as a fixed panellist. Byeon Gi-su is absent.
504	September 25	The Three Common Illnesses During Season Changes	Fixed: Lee Hye-jung, Byeon Gi-su; Non-fixed: Yoo Hyun-sang, Jeong Tae-ho, Park Sung-kwang, Yoon Young-mi, Crayon Pop (Choa, Geummi)	
505	October 2	Overcoming Climacterium (Menopause)	Fixed: Lee Hye-jung, Byeon Gi-su; Non-fixed: Jin Mi-ryeong, Kim Hak-chul, Ha Chun-hwa, Park Jong-ho, Won Mi-yeon, Kim Sook	
506	October 9	Rheumatic Arthritis	Fixed: Lee Hye-jung, Byeon Gi-su; Non-fixed: Lee Jung, Christina Confalonieri, Lee Man-ki, Kim Hyo-jin, Robert Holley, Hong Yeo-jin	IU fills in for Park Eun-young as a host.
507	October 16	Addiction to Sweet Flavours	Fixed: Lee Hye-jung, Kim Sook, Byeon Gi-su; Non fixed: Chun Myung-hoon, Hong Seok-cheon, Jang Young-ran, ZE:A (Heechul, Kwanghee)	Kim Sook's first episode as a fixed panellist.
508	October 23	Secret to Eternal Youth	Fixed: Lee Hye-jung, Kim Sook, Byeon Gi-su; Non-fixed: Oh Uk-cheol, Kim Hyun-chul & Choi Eun-kyung, Park Jun-gyu, Sunny Days (Sunkyung, Gyuhee)	
509	October 30	Osteoporosis	Fixed: Lee Hye-jung, Kim Sook, Byeon Gi-su; Non-fixed: Kim Jong-seo, K.Will, Kim Ji-sun, Lee Pa-ni, Mr. Mr (Tey, Changjae)	
510	November 6	Alcohol Dependency	Fixed: Lee Hye-jung, Kim Sook, Byeon Gi-su; Non-fixed: Lee Kye-in, Choi Hee, Danny Ahn, Cho Won-seok, Taru Salminen, Park Joon-hyung	. Byeon Gi-su's last episode as a fixed panellist.
511	November 13	Hair Loss	Fixed: Lee Hye-jung, Kim Sook; Non-fixed: Yang Sang-guk, Hong Jin-hee, Kim Jong-min, Sayuri Fujita, Kim Do-kyun, Sung Dae-hyun (R.ef)	
512	November 20	Headaches	Fixed: Lee Hye-jung, Kim Sook; Non-fixed: Jo Kwan-woo, Kim Young-hee, Heo Kyung-hwan, Lee Eui-jung, Lady Jane, Kang Kyun-sung (Noel)	
513	November 27	Sudden Death	Fixed: Lee Hye-jung, Kim Sook; Non-fixed: Kim Sung-soo (Cool), Insooni, Robert Holley, Lee Hyuk-jae, Sechs Kies (Kim Jae-duck, Jang Su-won)	
514	December 4	Dementia	Fixed: Lee Hye-jung, Kim Sook; Non-fixed: Shin Dong-seon, Park Wan-kyu, Lee Seung-shin, Park Hwi-sun, TASTY, Hyun Sook	
515	December 11	Three Common Winter Illnesses	Fixed: Lee Hye-jung, Kim Sook; Non-fixed: Lee Chang-myung, Kim Wan-sun, Danny Ahn, Christina Confalonieri, Secret (Sunhwa, Hana)	
516	December 18	Sports Star Special	Fixed: Lee Hye-jung, Kim Sook; Non-fixed: Kim Dong-hyun, Choi Byung-chul, Park Han-yi, Shin Soo-ji, Kwanghee, Hong Jin-young, Park Hyun-bin	
517	December 25	End-of-Year Special! Red Card King of the Kings	Fixed: Lee Hye-jung, Kim Sook; Non-fixed: Sung Dae-hyun (R.ef), Robert Holley, Kim Jung-ryul, Jeon Soo-kyung, Shin Dong-seon, Kim Hyun-chul, Bae Ki-sung	

=== 2014 ===
List of episodes (2014)

Episode	Air date	Title	Featured guests	Notes
518	January 1	Hair Enhancing Vitamins	Fixed: Lee Hye-jung, Kim Sook; Non-fixed: Han Jun-hee, Nancy Lang, Jeong Tae-ho, Ryu Si-hyun, Kim Kyung-jin	
519	January 8	Beauty Vitamins	Fixed: Lee Hye-jung, Kim Sook; Non-fixed: Park Joon-hyung, Kim Ji-min, Park So-yeong, Choi Wook, Koyote (Shin Ji, Kim Jong-min)	
520	January 15	Unwelcome Guests in the Body: Lumps	Fixed: Lee Hye-jung, Kim Sook; Non-fixed: Kim Hak-rae, Lee Seong-mi, Oh Sang-jin, Kim Jong-seo, Lim Jeong-hee, Kwon Jin-yeong	
521	January 22	Liver Health	Fixed: Lee Hye-jung, Kim Sook; Non-fixed: Chun Myung-hoon, Paeng Hyun-sook, Yoon Yong-hyun, Jeong Ju-ri, Han Hye-jin, Lee Sang-byuk	
522	January 29	Healthy Eyes	Fixed: Lee Hye-jung, Kim Sook; Non-fixed: Lee Si-eun, Jeon So-min, Kim Heung-gook, Jo Jung-chi, RAINBOW BLAXX (Seunga, Jaekyung)	
523	February 5	A Two-Faced Illness: Diabetes	Fixed: Lee Hye-jung, Kim Sook; Non-fixed: Hong Rok-gi, Yoon Gi-won, Kim Ae-kyung, Son Jin-young, Kim Hyo-jin, Lee Seon-min,	
524	February 12	The Smallest Killer in the World: Fine Dust	Fixed: Lee Hye-jung, Kim Sook; Non-fixed: Kim Hyun-chul, Lee Ji-ae, B1A4 (CNU, Sandeul), Ha Il-seong, Yoon Young-mi	
525	February 19	Constipation and Haemorrhoids	Fixed: Lee Hye-jung, Kim Sook; Non-fixed: Hong Seok-cheon, Jeong Ju-ri, T-ara (Hyomin, Eunjung), Kim Dae-seong, Jo Gap-gyeong, Kim Bo-hwa	
526	February 26	Spinal Illnesses	Fixed: Lee Hye-jung, Kim Sook; Non-fixed: Chun Myung-hoon, Do-hee (Tiny-G), Subin (Dal Shabet), Junggigo, Hwang Hyun-hee, Lee Su-na	
527	March 5	The Five Commandments of a Middle-Age Diet	Fixed: Lee Hye-jung, Kim Sook; Non-fixed: Heo Kyung-hwan, Kim Heung-gook, Jeong Jun-ha, Park Hyun-bin, Taru Salminen, Lee Guk-joo	
528	March 12	Energetic Spring Meals	Fixed: Lee Hye-jung, Kim Sook; Non-fixed: Sunwoo Yong-nyeo, Lee Se-joon, Christina Confalonieri, Hong Jin-ho, Hong Jin-young	
529	March 19	Family Illnesses, Part 1: Dad is Sick	Fixed: Lee Hye-jung, Kim Sook; Non-fixed: Kim Hak-chul, Ahn Sun-yeong, Yoon Gi-won, Yang Won-kyung, Sung Dae-hyun (R.ef), Ha Il-seong	
530	March 26	Family Illnesses, Part 2: Mom is Sick	Fixed: Lee Hye-jung, Kim Sook; Non-fixed: Lee Yoon-seong, MBLAQ (Thunder, Mir), Sa Mi-ja, Song Do-soon, Kim Hye-yeon	
531	April 2	Family Illnesses, Part 3: How to Live Alone	Fixed: Lee Hye-jung, Kim Sook; Non-fixed: Son Jin-young, Kim Wan-sun, Yang Jae-jin, Kim Hyeong-ja, Sayuri Fujita, Kim Kyung-jin	
532	April 9	Sleep Disorders	Fixed: Lee Hye-jung, Kim Sook; Non-fixed: Kim Hyun-chul, Apink (Bomi, Hayoung), Lee Chang-myung, Han Suk-joon, Nancy Lang	
533	April 16	Clean and Clear Blood	Fixed: Lee Hye-jung, Kim Sook; Non-fixed: Kim Young-chul, Ha Chun-hwa, Hong Kyung-min, The One, Cheon Yi-seul, Kim Ji-hyun	
534	April 30	Temporomandibular Joint Disorder	Fixed: Lee Hye-jung, Kim Sook; Non-fixed: Kim Saeng-min, Seo Kwon-soon, Orange Caramel (Lizzy, Nana), G.NA, Hong Dae-kwang, Lim Hyeok-pil	
535	May 7	Freckles, Age-spots, Wrinkles	Fixed: Lee Hye-jung, Kim Sook; Non-fixed: Kim Young-hee, Lee Kyung-jin, Kim Jung-ryul, Muzie, Jeong Ju-ri, Lee Seung-shin	
536	May 14	Pain	Fixed: Lee Hye-jung, Kim Sook; Non-fixed: Jin Mi-ryeong, Hyoseong, Yang Joon-hyuk, Geum Jandi, Kim Min-kyung, Jang Dong-min	
537	May 21	Thyroid Illnesses	Fixed: Lee Hye-jung, Kim Sook; Non-fixed: Yoon Gi-won, Hyun Young, Heo Jin, Shin Yoo, Kang Susie, Sung Dae-hyun (R.ef)	
538	May 28	The Two Faces of Medicine	Fixed: Lee Hye-jung, Kim Sook; Non-fixed: Chun Myung-hoon, Bae Ki-sung, Lim Chae-won, Yoo Hyun-sang, Yoo Min-sang, Kim Ji-sun	
539	June 4	Healing Foods	Fixed: Lee Hye-sung, Kim Sook; Non-fixed: Hong Rok-gi, INFINITE (Sungkyu, Hoya), Cho Min-hee, Brian Joo (Fly to the Sky), Lee Ji-hye, Kim Hyo-jin	
540	June 11	Lactic Acid Bacteria	Fixed: Lee Hye-jung, Kim Sook; Non-fixed: Ahn Ji-hwan, Hong Jin-young, Lee Changmin (2AM), Park Chan-sook, Park Na-rae	Park Eun-young is absent.
541	June 18	Food Poisoning	Fixed: Lee Hye-jung, Kim Sook; Non-fixed: Byeon Gi-su, Yang Yo-seob (BEAST, Kim Ga-yeon, Jeong Ju-ri, Kim Kyung-jin, Bae Yeon-jeong	
542	June 25	Foot Health	Fixed: Lee Hye-jung, Kim Sook; Non-fixed: Choi Hee, Choi Byung-chul, Sa Mi-ja, Eunjung (T-ara), Hwang Hyun-hee	
543	July 2	More Pain in the Summer	Fixed: Lee Hye-jung, Kim Sook; Non-fixed: Shin Dong-seon, Seo Kwon-soon, Heo Kyung-hwan, Boyfriend (Jeongmin, Donghyun), Kim Jun-hee, Hong Won-bin	
544	July 9	Pest Attack: Mosquitoes and Mites	Fixed: Lee Hye-jung, Kim Sook; Non-fixed: Park Jun-gyu, Lady Jane, K.Will, Park Hyun-bin, Seo Yeong-eun	
545	July 16	Summer Special: I Want to Stay Healthy	Fixed: Lee Hye-jung, Kim Sook; Non-fixed: Son Jin-young, Park Na-rae, Nancy Lang	
546	July 23	It's More Dangerous in the Summer: Heat, Cold, Moisture	Fixed: Lee Hye-jung, Kim Sook; Non-fixed: Sung Dae-hyun, Girl's Day (Sojin, Hyeri), Cho Hang-ri, Gong Seo-yeong, Lee Jung	
547	July 30	Lung Disease	Fixed: Lee Hye-jung, Kim Sook; Non-fixed: Sistar (Soyou, Bora), Ha Il-seong, Sam Okyere, Hwang Eun-jeong, Lee Byeong-jin	
548	August 6	Impulse Control Disorder	Fixed: Lee Hye-jung, Kim Sook; Non-fixed: Hong Jin-ho, Lee Su-na, Lee Dong-jun, Yoo Jae-hwan, Cheon Yi-seul	
549	August 13	Greek Special: Secrets of a Healthy 1 Hundred Years	Fixed: Lee Hye-jung, Kim Sook; Non-fixed: Yang Sang-guk, Jeong Ju-ri, Fabien, Sayuri Fujita, Christina Confalonieri, Sunny Days (Soojung, Jungyoon)	
550	August 20	2014 Summer Skin Report: People Who Are Afraid of Sunshine	Fixed: Lee Hye-jung, Kim Sook; Non-fixed: KARA (Gyuri, Hara), Homme, Kim Soo-yong, Enes Kaya	
551	August 27	More Fearful than Death: Suffering Dementia	Fixed: Lee Hye-jung, Kim Sook; Non-fixed: Kim Jong-min, Cho Min-hee, Secret (Hana, Hyoseong), Park Nam-jung, Hong In-kyu	
552	September 3	A Warning From Above: Gastrointestinal Diseases	Fixed: Lee Hye-jung; Non-fixed: Choi Yeong-wan, Hyun Young, Kim Hak-rae, Seok Joo-il, Lee Jung-min, BESTie (Hyeyeon, Haeryung)	Kim Sook is absent.
553	October 1	Adult Vaccines	Fixed: Lee Hye-jung, Kim Sook; Non-fixed: Jang Dong-hyuk, Shin Bo-ra, Lee Kye-in, Teen Top (Niel, Chunji), Kim Hyo-jin	
554	October 8	Ear Infections	Fixed: Lee Hye-jung, Kim Sook; Non-fixed: Hong Rok-gi, Jeon Won-ju, Hong Jin-young, Kim Jong-seo, Park Gi-ryang	
555	October 15	New Ways of Staying Healthy - Part 1	Fixed: Lee Hye-jung, Kim Sook; Non-fixed: Hyun Young, Heo Kyung-hwan, Kim Hyun-chul	
556	October 22	Metabolic Syndrome	Fixed: Lee Hye-jung, Kim Sook; Non-fixed: Kim Saeng-min, Nancy Lang, Kim Han-guk, The One, Seong Byeong-sook, Boyfriend (Minwoo, Kwangmin)	
557	October 29	New Ways of Staying Healthy - Part 2	Fixed: Lee Hye-jung, Kim Sook; Non-fixed: Hyun Young, Heo Kyung-hwan, Kim Hyun-chul	
558	November 12	Exercise is Ruining You	Fixed: Lee Hye-jung, Kim Sook; Non-fixed: Kim In-seok, Sunwoo Yong-nyeo, Kim Jung-ryul, Kim Young-hee, Park Ae-ri	
559	November 19	A Bloody, Stinking, Middle-Aged Tooth Problem: Toothaches	Fixed: Lee Hye-jung, Kim Sook; Non-fixed: Seo Kwon-soon, Kim Young-chul, Kangnam, Song Ji-eun, Kim Ji-sun, Yoon Moon-sik	
560	November 26	Counterattacking Viruses	Fixed: Non-fixed:	
561	December 3	A Wife's Nature	Fixed: Lee Hye-jung, Kim Sook; Non-fixed: Kim Hak-chul, Cho Min-hee, Ahn Sun-yeong, Yoon Gi-won & Hwang Eun-jeong, Lee Seung-shin	
562	December 10	Young and Healthy	Fixed: Lee Hye-jung, Kim Sook; Non-fixed: Kim Sung-soo (Cool), Noh Yoo-min, Jackson Wang (GOT7), Ilhoon (BtoB), Apink (Bomi, Hayoung), Rainbow (Jaekyung, Woori), Cheon Yi-seul	
563	December 17	Dangerous Food	Fixed: Lee Hye-jung, Kim Sook; Non-fixed: Park Ji-hoon, Do Kyung-wan, Chae Yeon, Jeong Ju-ri, Lee Chang-myung	
564	December 24	Will My Children be OK?	Fixed: Lee Hye-jung, Kim Sook; Non-fixed: Park Nam-jung, Park Si-eun, Cho Min-hee & Kwon Tae-won (Cho Min-hee's son), Seok Joo-il & Seok Neung-jun (Seok Joo-il's son), Seol Seo-hyun & Lee Ka-yoon (Seok Seo-hyun's daughter), Kim Sung-soo (Cool) & Kim Hye-bin (Kim Sung-soo's daughter)	

=== 2015 ===
List of episodes (2015)

Episode	Air date	Title	Featured guests	Notes
565	January 7	Alcohol, Liver & Yoghurt	Fixed: Lee Hye-jung, Kim Sook, Hyun Young, Kwanghee; Non-fixed: Fabien, Nancy Lang, Kim Heung-gook	Hyun Young and Kwanghee's first episode as fixed panellists. Lee Hye-jung's last episode as a fixed panellist.
566	January 14	Obesity	Fixed: Kim Sook, Hyun Young, Kim Sung-soo; Non-fixed: Julian, Kim Jun-hyun, Yoo Min-sang, Kim Su-yeong, Song Yeong-gil	Kwanghee is absent. Kim Sung-soo's first episode as a fixed panellist.
567	January 21	Smoking Bans & Instant Ramen	Fixed: Kim Sook, Hyun Young, Kwanghee, Kim Sung-soo; Non-fixed: Kim Jung-ryul, Chun Myung-hoon, Hong Jin-ho, Kim Soo-yong	
568	January 28	Dementia	Fixed: Kim Sook, Hyun Young, Kwanghee, Kim Sung-soo; Non-fixed: Song Eun-i, Ahn Yeon-hong, Jang Youngran	Kim Sook participates as part of the non-fixed guests.
569	February 4	Diabetes & Coffee	Fixed: Kim Sook, Hyun Young, Kwanghee, Kim Sung-soo; Non-fixed: Kim Kyung-jin, Jo Gap-gyeong, Kim Hyun-chul	
570	February 11	Constipation & Toothpaste	Fixed: Kim Sook, Hyun Young, Kwanghee, Kim Sung-soo; Non-fixed: Jang Do-yeon, Park Na-rae, Jo Jung-chi, Lady Jane	
571	February 25	Skin	Fixed: Kim Sook, Hyun Young, Kwanghee, Kim Sung-soo; Non-fixed: Jo Hye-ryun, Shin Bong-sun, Kim Young-hee, Hani	
572	March 4	Snoring	Fixed: Kim Sook, Hyun Young, Kwanghee, Kim Sung-soo; Non-fixed: Robert Holley, Park Ji-hoon, Yoo Sang-moo, Park Hwi-sun	
573	March 11	Back Pain & Rice	Fixed: Kim Sook, Hyun Young, Kwanghee, Kim Sung-soo; Non-fixed: Kim Jung-nam (Turbo), Kim Jin, Niel	Kim Sung-soo participates as part of the non-fixed guests.
574	March 18	Hair Loss	Fixed: Kim Sook, Hyun Young, Kwanghee, Kim Sung-soo; Non-fixed: Hwang Hyun-hee, Bae Han-seong, Kim Bum-soo, Kang Kyun-sung	
575	March 25	One Hundred Years of Bo-yang-sik	Fixed: Kim Sook, Hyun Young, Kwanghee, Kim Sung-soo; Non-fixed: Hong Jin-young, Kim Hak-rae, Jeong Tae-ho, Kim Mi-ryeo	
576	April 1	The Silent Killer: Colon Cancer	Fixed: Kim Sook, Hyun Young, Kwanghee, Kim Sung-soo; Non-fixed: Yoo Hyun-sang, Yoon Hyeong-bin, Yoon Jung-soo, Yoon Young-mi	
577	April 8	Diseases Threatening Old Age - Part 1: Hypertension	Fixed: Kim Sook, Hyun Young, Kwanghee, Kim Sung-soo; Non-fixed: Lee Kyung-jin, Seok Joo-il, Shin Ji, Yeom Kyung-hwan	
578	April 15	Diseases Threatening Old Age - Part 2: Arthritis	Fixed: Kim Sook, Hyun Young, Kwanghee, Kim Sung-soo; Non-fixed: Ha Chun-hwa, Kim Han-guk, Seong Byeong-sook, Im Sung-min	
579	April 22	Diseases Threatening Old Age - Part 3: Aches and Pains	Fixed: Kim Sook, Hyun Young, Kwanghee, Kim Sung-soo; Non-fixed: Sa Mi-ja, Kim Sung-hwan, Paeng Hyun-sook, NS Yoon-G	
580	April 29	Presbyopia and Hearing loss	Fixed: Kim Sook, Hyun Young, Kwanghee, Kim Sung-soo; Non-fixed: Sunwoo Yong-nyeo, Jo Kwon, Lee Si-eun, Lee Chang-myung	Park Eun-young and Eun Ji-won's last episode as hosts. Kim Sook and Kim Sung-soo's last episode as fixed panellists.
581	May 6	Domestic Month Special: Family Health Project (Part 1)	Fixed: Hyun Young, Kwanghee; Non-fixed: Kim Hyun-chul, Kim Hak-rae, Jo Tong-dal, Jo Kwan-woo	Jeong Ji-won's first episode as a host.
582	May 13	Domestic Month Special: Family Health Project (Part 2)	Fixed: Hyun Young, Kwanghee; Non-fixed: Kim Jung-ryul, Hong Yeo-jin, Sistar (Bora, Soyu)	
583	May 20	Domestic Month Special: Family Health Project (Part 3)	Fixed: Hyun Young, Kwanghee; Non-fixed: Kim Hak-chul, Kim Ga-yeon, Kim In-seok, Angela Park	
584	May 27	Domestic Month Special: Family Health Project (Part 4)	Fixed: Hyun Young; Non-fixed: Lee Ki-yeol, Shin Soo-ji, Lee Sang-ho, Lee Sang-min	Kwanghee is absent.
585	June 3	Last Health Boy Diet	Fixed: Hyun Young, Kwanghee; Non-fixed: Kim Su-yeong, Lee Guk-joo, Lee Seung-yoon, Song Yeong-gil	
586	June 10	Heart Disease	Fixed: Hyun Young, Kwanghee; Non-fixed: Yang Taek-jo, Oh Young-sil, Choi Jung-won	
587	June 17	MRSA Virus & Respiratory Disease	Fixed: Hyun Young, Kwanghee; Non-fixed: Do Kyung-wan, Jang Yun-jeong, Jo Young-gu, Geum Jandi, Seo Tae-hoon	
588	June 24	Brain Health: How to Prevent Dementia	Fixed: Hyun Young, Kwanghee; Non-fixed: Moon Young-mi, Kim Do-kyun, Chun Myung-hoon	
589	July 8	Fearful White Powder! Salt VS Sugar	Fixed: Hyun Young, Kwanghee; Non-fixed: Seok Joo-il, Moon Chun-sik, Choi Yeong-wan, Lady Jane	
590	July 15	The Laws of Summer Health	Fixed: Hyun Young, Kwanghee; Non-fixed: Won Mi-yeon, Kim Sae-rom, Jang Do-yeon, AOA (Jimin, Yuna)	
591	July 22	Win Summer Over with Bo-yang-sik	Fixed: Hyun Young, Kwanghee; Non-fixed: Lee Jung-sup, Kim Hyo-jin, Sayuri Fujita, Yang Sang-guk	
592	July 29	Protecting Your Skin in Summer	Fixed: Hyun Young, Kwanghee; Non-fixed: Moon Hee-kyung, Kim Won-jun, Park Na-rae, Sojin (Girl's Day)	
593	August 5	Summer Special: Dreadful Vitamins	Fixed: Hyun Young, Kwanghee; Non-fixed: Lee Yoon-seok, Chae Yeon, Kim Jung-min, Apink (Bomi, Hayoung)	
594	August 12	What Are They?: Have You Had Colon Cancer?	Fixed: Hyun Young, Kwanghee; Non-fixed: Park Sang-cheol, Seo Kwon-soon, Park Hwi-sun, Hong Jin-young, Kim Ki-hyeon, Baek Chung-kang	
595	August 19	Water Health: How to Change Mine	Fixed: Hyun Young, Kwanghee; Non-fixed: Jeong Ga-eun, Seok Joo-il, Shim Jin-hwa, Kim Won-hyo	
596	August 27	How to Eat Healthy and Delicious Meat - Beef, Pork, Chicken	Fixed: Hyun Young, Kwanghee; Non-fixed: Lee Kye-in, Lee Kyung-ae, Jung Sung-ho, Shin Bong-sun, Moon Se-yoon	
597	September 3	From Shingles to Cancer: Zero Incidence Rate Challenge!	Fixed: Hyun Young; Non-fixed: Lee Ki-yeol, Lee Eui-jung, Kim Seung-hyun, Lee Ji-hyun, Moon Se-yoon	Kwanghee is absent.
598	September 10	My Body is Poisonous! Heavy Metal Detox!	Fixed: Hyun Young, Kwanghee; Non-fixed: Hong In-kyu & Hong Tae-kyung (Hong In-kyu's son), Seol Seo-hyun & Lee Ga-yoon (Seol Seo-hyun's daughter), Choi Da-eun (Hyun Young's daughter)	The children's blood metal levels were analysed.
599	September 17	The Laws of Oil Health	Fixed: Hyun Young, Kwanghee; Non-fixed: Jo Young-gu, Eunjung (T-ara), Song Yeong-gil, Lee Sang-hun, Paeng Hyun-sook	
600	September 24	600th Episode Special Feature: A Doctor's Law of Health - The White Coat Dictionary (Part 1)	Fixed: Hyun Young, Kwanghee; Non-fixed: Seok Joo-il, Kim Jung-min, Kim Ji-sun, Kim Hak-rae, Lee Seong-mi	
601	October 1	600th Episode Special Feature: A Doctor's Law of Health - The White Coat Dictionary (Part 2) - From A to ...	Fixed: Hyun Young, Kwanghee; Non-fixed: Seok Joo-il, Kim Jung-min, Kim Ji-sun, Kim Hak-rae, Lee Seong-mi	
602	October 8	Blood Recovery: A How-to-Guide	Fixed: Hyun Young, Kwanghee; Non-fixed: Song Ji-eun, Hong Rok-gi, Lee Su-na, Yoo Hyun-sang, Ray Yang, Choi Mu-bae	
603	October 15	The Laws of Stance Health	Fixed: Hyun Young, Kwanghee; Non-fixed: Park Gi-ryang, Hong Jin-ho, Rumiko Tani, Kim Hyun-chul, Berry Good	
604	November 5	Seasonal Changes & Its Diseases	Fixed: Hyun Young, Kwanghee; Non-fixed: Bae Ki-sung, Sa Mi-ja, Lee Dong-jun, Park Na-rae, SONAMOO (Minjae, Sumin, Nahyun, Eujin), Ray Yang	
605	November 12	Intestinal Bacteria and The Process of Infection	Fixed: Hyun Young, Kwanghee; Non-fixed: Choi Byeong-seo, Lee Seung-shin, Jang Su-won (Sechs Kies), Lee Jae-eun, Melody Day	
606	November 19	Mental Health	Fixed: Hyun Young, Kwanghee, Park Na-rae; Non-fixed: Noh Hyun-hee, Park Bo-ram, Yoo Sang-moo, Yoon Jung-soo, BESTie	Park Na-rae's first episode as a fixed panellist.
607	November 26	Cellulite	Fixed: Hyun Young, Kwanghee, Park Na-rae; Non-fixed: Kim Heung-gook, Sayuri Fujita, Ha Chun-hwa, Kim Hyo-jin, Stellar (Hyoeun, Minhee, Gayoung, Jeonyul)	
608	December 3	Chronic Fatigue	Fixed: Hyun Young, Kwanghee, Park Na-rae; Non-fixed: Sun Ha, Lee Ki-yeol, Lady Jane, Lee Se-joon, Ray Yang, Hello Venus (Nara, Alice, Lime, Seoyoung, Yeoreum)	
609	December 10	Long Live the Country of Georgia: 'Longevity Secrets' For the Public!	Fixed: Hyun Young, Kwanghee, Park Na-rae, Ray Yang; Non-fixed: Lee Sang-byuk, Christina Confalonieri, Robert Holley, Fei, Moon Sook	Ray Yang's first episode as a fixed panellist.
610	December 17	No Smoking and Drinking	Fixed: Hyun Young, Kwanghee, Park Na-rae, Ray Yang; Non-fixed: Seo Tae-hoon, Kim Ji-ho, Lee Byeong-jin, Ahn Ji-hwan, Red Velvet (Wendy, Irene, Seulgi, Yeri)	
611	December 24	A Complete Summary of 2015's Health Issues: From Infections (MRSA, Hepatitis C, Pneumonia) to Functional Health Food (Cynanchum bungei)	Fixed: Hyun Young, Kwanghee, Park Na-rae, Ray Yang; Non-fixed: Kim Sae-rom, Seok Joo-il, Yoon Young-mi, Yoo Hyun-sang, Lovelyz (Baby Soul, Jiae, Yein, Jisoo)	

=== 2016 ===
List of episodes (2016)

Episode	Air date	Title	Featured guests	Notes
612	January 7	Eating Habits	Fixed: None. Non-fixed: Oh Young-sil, Noh Joo-hyun, Kim Ji-sun, Jung Eun-pyo, Kim Won-jun, Sleepy, April (Chaewon, Hyunjoo, Naeun, Yena, Jinsol)	Hyun Young, Kwanghee, Park Na-rae and Ray Yang are absent.
613	January 14	Winter Healthcare	Fixed: Hyun Young, Kwanghee, Park Na-rae, Ray Yang; Non-fixed: Park Hyo-jun, Moon Young-mi, Shim Yang-hong, Shin Ji, Dal Shabet (Woohee, Ah Young, Serri, Subin)	
614	January 21	Dizziness	Fixed: Hyun Young, Kwanghee, Park Na-rae, Ray Yang; Non-fixed: Hong Yeo-jin, Cho Yoon-ho, Park Sun-young, Kim Jung-ryul, Laboum (ZN, Yujeong, Yulhee, Solbin)	
615	January 28	Binge Eating Midnight Snacks	Fixed: Hyun Young, Kwanghee, Park Na-rae, Ray Yang; Non-fixed: Nam Chang-hee, Stephanie, Kim Min-kyung, Yoo Min-sang, Purfles (Wooyoung, Geonhee, Eunyong)	
616	February 4	Arthritis	Fixed: Hyun Young, Ray Yang; Non-fixed: Yeom Dong-heon, Ryu Si-hyeon, Heo Jin, Kim Jung-nam (Turbo), Kim Ji-min, Nine Muses (Hyuna, Hyemi, Keumjo, Minha, Sojin)	Kwanghee and Park Na-rae are absent.
617	February 11	Reach Your 70s Healthily~	Fixed: Hyun Young, Kwanghee, Park Na-rae, Ray Yang; Non-fixed: Kim Ki-hyeon, Sunwoo Yong-nyeo, Lee Sang-byuk, Jang Min-ho	
618	February 18	Eye Health	Fixed: Hyun Young, Kwanghee, Park Na-rae, Ray Yang; Non-fixed: Kwon Jin-yeong, Jo Young-gu, Paeng Hyun-sook, DIA (Jenny, Seunghee, Yebin, Eunjin)	
619	February 25	Balance Your Hormones!	Fixed: Hyun Young, Kwanghee, Park Na-rae, Ray Yang; Non-fixed: Lim Soo-min, Im Baek-chun, Gyuri, Kim Hyung-il, Melody Day	
620	March 10	The Mental Health of Children	Fixed: Hyun Young, Kwanghee, Park Na-rae, Ray Yang; Non-fixed: Kim Bong-gon, Lee Si-eun, Seok Joo-il, Jo Gap-gyeong, AOA (Yuna, Hyejeong, Chanmi)	
621	March 17	Overweight vs Underweight	Fixed: Hyun Young, Kwanghee, Park Na-rae, Ray Yang; Non-fixed: Moon Se-yooon, Lee Sang-hun, Lady Jane, Sleepy, Red Velvet (Irene, Seulgi, Yeri)	
622	March 24	Cancer: The Most Dreaded Disease!	Fixed: Hyun Young, Kwanghee, Park Na-rae, Ray Yang; Non-fixed: Yoon Hyeong-bin, Han Yeong, Yang Se-chan, Rainbow (Jaekyung, Jisook, Noeul and Yoonhye)	
623	March 31	Hypertension vs Hypotension	Fixed: Hyun Young, Kwanghee, Park Na-rae, Ray Yang; Non-fixed: Oh Mi-yeon, Don Spike, Lizzy, Kim Han-guk, Brave Girls (Minjeong, Yujeong, Eunji, Hyeran)	
624	April 7	Oversleeping vs Undersleeping	Fixed: Hyun Young, Kwanghee, Park Na-rae, Ray Yang; Non-fixed: MINO, Hong Jin-young, Yum Kyung-hwan, Jun Hyo-seong, Oh My Girl (YooA, Jiho, Hyojung, Binnie)	
625	April 14	Diabetes	Fixed: Hyun Young, Kwanghee, Park Na-rae, Ray Yang; Non-fixed: Park Bo-ram, Yoon Taek, Lee Kyung-ae, Lee Ki-yeol, Cosmic Girls (Dawon, SeolA, Cheng Xiao, Eunseo)	
626	April 21	Anti-aging: How to Avoid Aging	Fixed: Hyun Young, Kwanghee, Park Na-rae, Ray Yang; Non-fixed: Zo Bin, Mina, Kim Hyun-chul, Im Sung-min, Lee Soon-jung, Laboum (Solbin, Soyeon, Yulhee, Haein)	Park Na-rae's last episode as a fixed panellist.
627	April 28	Personal Health	Fixed: Hyun Young, Kwanghee, Ray Yang; Non-fixed: Tei, Heo Jin, Shin Bong-sun, Ryu Jeong-nam, Jin Hae-sung, Fiestar (Jei, Hyemi, Linzy)	
628	May 5	Respiratory Health	Fixed: Hyun Young, Kwanghee, Ray Yang; Non-fixed: Kim Hak-do, Seo Yu-ri, Yoon Jung-soo, Kim Ji-sun, Crush, Berry Good	Ray Yang's last episode as a fixed panellist.
629	May 12	Hepatitis	Fixed: Hyun Young, Kwanghee, Yang Jung-won; Non-fixed: Kim Kyung-rok, Lee Ji-hye, Sung Dae-hyun, Hyun Jin-young, Jeong Ju-ri, April	Yang Jung-won joins cast as a fixed panellist.
630	May 19	Colon Disease	Fixed: Hyun Young, Kwanghee, Yang Jung-won; Non-fixed: Lee Yong-nyeo, Ahn Se-ha, Kim Young-hee, Bae Han-seong, Shin Bong-sun, I.O.I (Lim Na-young, Kim Chung-ha, Kim So-hye and Choi Yoo-jung)	
631	May 26	Two-Faced Household Products	Fixed: Hyun Young, Kwanghee, Yang Jung-won; Non-fixed: Seok Joo-il, Lady Jane, Brian Joo, Kim Hye-yeon, Kim Jung-min, Twice (Jeongyeon, Momo, Jihyo, Mina and Tzuyu)	
632	June 9	Herniated Spinal Discs	Fixed: Hyun Young, Kwanghee, Yang Jung-won; Non-fixed: Guillaume Patry, Seo Kwon-soon, Nam Hyun-joon, Park Seul-gi, Nam Chang-hee, AOA (Yuna, Hyejeong, Mina, Chanmi)	
633	June 16	Good Carbs vs Bad Carbs	Fixed: Hyun Young, Kwanghee, Yang Jung-won; Non-fixed: Lee Won-il, Lee Sang-min, Lee Su-ji, Yoo Min-sang, Shin Bong-sun, Lovelyz (Baby Soul, Jisoo, Yein and Jiae)	
634	June 23	Drinking Health	Fixed: Hyun Young, Kwanghee, Yang Jung-won, Lady Jane; Non-fixed: Kim Soo-yong, Kim Hyo-jin, Yoo Jae-hwan, Jin A-reum, Lee Won-il, DIA (Yebin, Huihyeon, Chaeyeon)	Lady Jane joins cast as a fixed panellist.
635	June 30	Prostates	Fixed: Hyun Young, Kwanghee, Yang Jung-won, Lady Jane; Non-fixed: Shim Hyun-seop, Kang Jun-woo (Rose Motel), Kim Seung-hyun, Monsta X (I.M, Kihyun, Shownu, Wonho, Jooheon)	
636	July 7	A Dignified Middle-Aged Summer	Fixed: Hyun Young, Kwanghee, Yang Jung-won, Lady Jane; Non-fixed: Jo Young-gu, Jeong Ju-ri, Sleepy, Won Mi-yeon	
637	July 14	Intruders of the Summer, The Bugs Attack!	Fixed: Hyun Young, Kwanghee, Kim Hyo-jin, Lady Jane; Non-fixed: Hyun Sook, Boom, JeA, Kangnam, WANNA.B (Lina, Sejin, Ami, Eunsom)	Yang Jung-won is absent. Kim Hyo-jin replaces her.
638	July 21	Pancreatic Cancer	Fixed: Hyun Young, Kwanghee, Yang Jung-won, Lady Jane; Non-fixed: Choi Byeong-seo, Yoo Hye-ri, Don Spike, Yewon, Melody Day	
639	July 28	The Kidney	Fixed: Hyun Young, Kwanghee, Yang Jung-won, Lady Jane; Non-fixed: Lee Dong-jun, Dasom, Kim Won-jun, Rumiko Tani, Gugudan (Hana, Nayoung, Mina and Hyeyeon)	
640	August 4	The Mising	Fixed: Hyun Young, Kwanghee, Yang Jung-won, Lady Jane; Non-fixed: Lee Sang-byuk, Hwang Hye-young, Hong Kyung-min, Choi Hee, Stellar (Hyoeun, Jeonyul, Gayoung, Minhee)	
641	August 25	Rio Olympics: Special Feature	Fixed: Hyun Young, Lady Jane; Non-fixed: Sim Kwon-ho, Joo Hyun-hung, Kim Jae-bum, Hak Jin, Seok Joo-il, Ye Jung-hwa	Kwanghee and Yang Jung-won are absent.
642	September 1	Cholesterol	Fixed: Hyun Young, Yang Jung-won, Lady Jane; Non-fixed: Baek Ji-young, Kim Hyung-il, Moon Young-mi, Park Hyo-jun, Nam Chang-hee, U Sung-eun	. Kwanghee is absent.
643	September 8	Holiday Syndrome	Fixed: Hyun Young, Kwanghee, Lady Jane, Kim Hyo-jin; Non-fixed: Yoon Young-mi, Kim Ki-hyeon, Shin Bo-ra, Park Sang-cheol, Kim Do-kyun	Yang Jung-won is absent. Kim Hyo-jin replaces her.
644	September 22	Managing Your Health and Studying Well	Fixed: Hyun Young, Kwanghee, Yang Jung-won, Lady Jane; Non-fixed: Ryu Si-hyun, Blair Williams, Kim So-jung, Noh Yoo-min, Berry Good (Gowoon, Daye),	
645	September 29	Expiry Dates & Shelf Lives	Fixed: Hyun Young, Kwanghee, Yang Jung-won, Lady Jane; Non-fixed: Jo Gap-gyeong, Kim Jae-woo, Woohee, Fabien, Pi Hyun-jung	
646	October 20	How to Survive an Earthquake	Fixed: Hyun Young, Kwanghee, Yang Jung-won, Lady Jane; Non-fixed: Jung Chan, Seo Kwon-soon, Min Ji-young, Noh Woo-jin, Jieun	
647	October 27	Water Changes My Body	Fixed: Hyun Young, Kwanghee, Yang Jung-won, Lady Jane; Non-fixed: Byun Jung-soo, Lee Se-joon, Lee Ji-hye, DinDin, Lizzy	Jeong Ji-won's last episode as a host. Hyun Young, Kwanghee, Yang Jung-won and Lady Jane's last episode as fixed panellists.
648	November 10	The Regional Truth Game	Fixed: Kim Eung-soo, Hong Kyung-min, Son Jun-ho, Ji Joo-yeon; Non-fixed: None.	Kim Tae-hoon's first episode as a host. Kim Eung-soo, Hong Kyung-min, Son Jun-ho and Ji Joo-yeon's first episode as fixed panellists.
649	November 17	The Common Cold: Are There Cures For It?	Fixed: Kim Eung-soo, Hong Kyung-min, Son Jun-ho, Ji Joo-yeon; Non-fixed: None.	
650	November 24	Vaccinations: Should We Do It?	Fixed: Kim Eung-soo, Hong Kyung-min, Son Jun-ho, Ji Joo-yeon; Non-fixed: None.	
651	December 1	A Drunken Society: Alcohol is Poisonous	Fixed: Kim Eung-soo, Hong Kyung-min, Ji Joo-yeon; Non-fixed: Seo Jang-hoon	Son Jun-ho is absent, due to performing at a musical.
652	December 8	Korea is Depressed: What is the Way Out?	Fixed: Kim Eung-soo, Hong Kyung-min, Ji Joo-yeon, Kim Tae-hoon; Non-fixed: None.	Son Jun-ho is absent. Kim Tae-hoon replaces him.
653	December 15	The Secrets of Anti-Aging Injections	Fixed: Kim Eung-soo, Hong Kyung-min, Ji Joo-yeon, Kim Tae-hoon; Non-fixed: None.	Son Jun-ho is absent. Kim Tae-hoon replaces him.
654	December 22	2016 Vitamin No.5	Fixed: Kim Eung-soo, Hong Kyung-min, Ji Joo-yeon, Kim Tae-hoon; Non-fixed: None.	Son Jun-ho is absent. Kim Tae-hoon replaces him.

=== 2017 ===
List of episodes (2017)

Episode	Air date	Title	Featured guests	Notes
655	January 5	Nutrients: A How-to-Guide	Fixed: Kim Eung-soo, Hong Kyung-min, Ji Joo-yeon; Non-fixed: Kim Sung-kyung	Son Jun-ho is absent.
656	January 12	Medicinal Superfoods	Fixed: Kim Eung-soo, Hong Kyung-min, Ji Joo-yeon; Non-fixed: Lee Yeon-bok	Son Jun-ho is absent.
657	January 19	Surgery or No Surgery? (Part 1): Joints	Fixed: Kim Eung-soo, Hong Kyung-min, Son Jun-ho; Non-fixed: Moon Hee-kyung, Kim So-hyun	Ji Joo-yeon is absent.
658	January 26	Surgery or No Surgery? (Part 2): Thyroid Cancer	Fixed: Kim Eung-soo, Hong Kyung-min, Son Jun-ho; Non-fixed: Hong Ji-min	Doctor and Professor Heo Yang-im joined as a fixed clinical professional. Ji Joo-yeon is absent.
659	February 2	Surgery or No Surgery? (Part 3): The Spine	Fixed: Kim Eung-soo, Hong Kyung-min, Son Jun-ho; Non-fixed: Kim Jong-min	Ji Joo-yeon is absent.
660	February 9	The War With My Body: Obesity	Fixed: Kim Eung-soo, Hong Kyung-min, Son Jun-ho; Non-fixed: Kim Jung-min, Heo Kyung-hwan	. Ji Joo-yeon is absent.
661	February 16	The Silent Killer: Diabetes	Fixed: Kim Eung-soo, Hong Kyung-min, Son Jun-ho; Non-fixed: Jo Chung-hyun, Moon Ji-ae	Ji Joo-yeon is absent.
662	February 23	Silent Warnings From Your Blood Vessels: High Blood Pressure	Fixed: Kim Eung-soo, Hong Kyung-min, Son Jun-ho; Non-fixed: Shindong, Solbin	Ji Joo-yeon is absent.
663	March 2	Hair Loss, Athlete's Foot, Haemorrhoids: Unspoken Diseases	Fixed: Kim Eung-soo, Hong Kyung-min, Son Jun-ho; Non-fixed: Kim Soo-yong, Cheng Xiao	Ji Joo-yeon is absent.
664	March 9	No! No! Stress	Fixed: Kim Eung-soo, Hong Kyung-min, Son Jun-ho; Non-fixed: Do Kyung-wan, Jang Yun-jeong	.Final episode. Ji Joo-yeon is absent.

== Electronic cookbook ==
In 2008, Nintendo of Korea released a licensed electronic cookbook based on the series for the Nintendo DS, titled DS Vitamin: A Guide to Healthy Cooking at a Great Table (Hangul: DS 비타민 위대한 밥상 말하는 건강요리 길잡이), exclusively in the country. Developed by NOK partner Skonec, this voice-controlled software functions similarly to the DS e-cookbook Personal Trainer: Cooking, also published by Nintendo worldwide within the same year.

== See also ==
- Best Doctors
