= List of Star King episodes =

The following is a listing of episodes of Star King (Korean: 놀라운 대회! 스타킹). Star King is a South Korean show which first aired on January 13, 2007 on SBS and ended on August 9, 2016.

== Background ==
It starts on every Saturday from 6:20pm to 8:00pm. Star King is the first TV show in Korea which runs online and on TV simultaneously. In addition, people come from a variety of countries such as Brazil, Mongolia and Kenya, aging from 5 years old to 101 years old. Because of these unique people, Star King easily gained audiences. Once, Star King had the best audience ratings between Saturday TV shows. However, presently, has Star King lost a lot in audience ratings after the fabrication.

Star King is hosted by Kang Ho Dong. He temporarily left the show, leaving Boom and Super Junior's leader Leeteuk as the hosts. Leeteuk has since started his military service, leaving the show to Kang Ho Dong and Boom as the hosts.

== Episodes (2006–2007) ==
List of episodes in 2006-2007 (1-48)

Date	Episode	Guests
061216	Ep. 1	Son Ho-young, Haha, Noh Sa-yeon, Ji Sang-ryeol, G-Dragon, Seungri
070120	Ep. 2	Kangin (Super Junior)
070127	Ep. 3	Kim Jong-min, Bae Seul-ki
070203	Ep. 4	Lee Jong Soo
0702010	Ep. 5	Taehwa and Chris (Battle)
070217	Ep. 6	Kangin & Leeteuk (Super Junior)
070224	Ep. 7	Yang Eun-ji (Baby VOX Re.V), Kan Mi-youn (Baby VOX)
070303	Ep. 8	Brian, Kangin (Super Junior), Haha, Jang Youngran, Noh Sa-yeon, Ji Sang-ryeol
070310	Ep. 9	Super Junior-T, Song Dae-kwan, Haha, Noh Sa-yeon, Ji Sang-ryeol
070317	Ep. 10	Brian, Kangin (Super Junior), Shindong (Super Junior), Kim Kyung-rok (V.O.S), Haha, Noh Sa-yeon, Ji Sang-ryeol
070324	Ep. 11	Wonder Girls
070331	Ep. 12	Super Junior-T, Jo Hyung Ki, Noh Sa-yeon, Ji Sang-ryeol
070414	Ep. 13	TVXQ! Special Part 1: TVXQ, Haha, Noh Sa-yeon, Ji Sang-ryeol
070421	Ep. 14	TVXQ! Special Part 2: TVXQ, Haha, Noh Sa-yeon, Ji Sang-ryeol; Second Half: Kangin (Super Junior), Wonder Girls, Baby Vox Re.V
070428	Ep. 15	Kangin (Super Junior), Jin Tae-hwa and Ryu (Battle), Younha, Hwangbo, Boom
070505	Ep. 16	Children's Day special: Cho Seung-woo, Lee Seung-gi, Park Ji-sung, Jun Jin (Shinhwa), Ahn Yong-joon, Jin Kyoung (Baby Vox Re.V)
070512	Ep. 17	Super Junior-T, Epik High, Haha, Ji Sang-ryeol
070519	Ep. 18	Chae Yeon, Haha
070526	Ep. 19	Kangin (Super Junior), Byul, Paran, Haha, Lee Soo-geun, Boom
070602	Ep. 20	Kangin (Super Junior), Boom, CSJH The Grace
070609	Ep. 21	Kangin (Super Junior), Boom
070616	Ep. 22	Kangin (Super Junior), Boom, CSJH The Grace
070623	Ep. 23	Oh Jung-hae, CSJH
070630	Ep. 24	Kangin (Super Junior), Boom
070707	Ep. 25	Kangin (Super Junior), Boom, Younha
070714	Ep. 26	Kangin (Super Junior), Fly To The Sky, Lyn, Boom, Lee Soo-geun, CSJH
070721	Ep. 27	Choi Si-won, Kim Ki-bum, Lee Donghae, Kangin, Kim Hee-chul, and Kim Ryeo-wook (Super Junior), Boom, Fly to the Sky, Noh Sa-yeon
070728	Ep. 28	Kangin (Super Junior), Chae Yeon, Battle, Boom, Haha, Shin Hae-chul, Oh Jong-hyuk
070804	Ep. 29	Summer vacation special
070811	Ep. 30	Kangin (Super Junior), Solbi, Boom, Haha
070825	Ep. 31	China Special Part 1: Han Geng (Super Junior), Shin Ji (Koyote), Park Ga-won, Choi Won-joon, Yang Se-hyung, Noh Sa-yeon, Haha, Noh Hong-chul
070901	Ep. 32	China Special Part 2: Han Geng (Super Junior), Shin Ji (Koyote), Park Gawon, Choi Won-joon, Yang Se-hyung, Noh Sa-yeon, Haha, Noh Hong-chul
070908	Ep. 33	F.T. Island, Boom, Kim Jong-seo, Noh Sayeon
070915	Ep. 34	Girls' Generation, Kim Jae-duck
070922	Ep. 35	Chuseok special: Taeyeon, Hyoyeon, Yuri, Sooyoung, Yoona (Girls' Generation), Kim Mi-ryeo, Park Seong-yeol, Choi Jae-sik
070929	Ep. 36	M (Shinhwa), TYKEYS, Jun Ji-hyun
071006	Ep. 37	Wonder Girls, Lee Seung-gi, Wheesung, Boom, Jo Hyung-ki, Haha, Noh Sa-yeon
071013	Ep. 38	Leeteuk, Heechul, Yesung, Shindong, Sungmin, Eunhyuk, Donghae, Siwon, Ryeowook, Kyuhyun, Han Geng, and Kangin (Super Junior), Boom, Jo Hyung-ki, Haha, Noh Sa-yeon
071020	Ep. 39	Shin Hyesung (Shinhwa), Nam Gyu-ri (SeeYa), Kang Kyun-sung (Noel), Shin Bong-sun, Jo Hyung-ki, Kim Jong-seo (Boohwal), Noh Sa-yeon
071103	Ep. 40	Big Bang, Boom, Haha, Jo Hyung-ki
071110	Ep. 41	F.T. Island, Taeyeon, Yuri, and Tiffany (Girls' Generation), Tae Jin-ah
071117	Ep. 42	Girls' Generation, Wonder Girls, Koyote
071124	Ep. 43	Younha, Bae Seul-ki, Baek Ji-young, Lee Soo-young, Jeong Jun-ha
071201	Ep. 44	Eru, Tim, Sung Si-kyung, Lee Seung-chul, Haha, Boom, Jo Won-suk, Jo Hyung-ki, Noh Sa-yeon, 2007 Supermodels
071208	Ep. 45	Eun Ji-won, MayBee, Mr. Tyfoon (Clover), Boom, Jung Hyung-don, Kim Byung-man, Haha, Jo Hyung-ki
071215	Ep. 46	Tritops, Sung Eun, Kim Kwang-kyu, Kim Na-young, Haha, Boom, Jo Hyung-ki, Jeong Jong-cheol, Kim In-suk, Oh Ji-heon
071222	Ep. 47	Super Junior, Bae Seul-ki, Haha, Boom, Jo Hyung-ki, Noh Sa-yeon
071229	Ep. 48	Year-End Special: Girls' Generation, Min Kyung-hoon, Song Eun-i, Haha, Boom, Kim Jong-seo (Boohwal), Noh Sa-yeon

== Episodes (2008) ==
List of episodes in 2008 (49-97)

Date	Episode	Guests
080105	Ep. 49	Girls' Generation, Kim Na-young, Lee Jae-eun, Yoon Jung-soo, Boom, Haha, Jo Hyung-ki, Kim Jung-hyun
080112	Ep. 50	Jo Hyung-ki, Haha, Boom, Tim, Kim Na-young, Girls' Generation, F.T. Island
080119	Ep. 51	Jo Hyung-ki, Haha, Kim Na-young, Yoon Jong-shin, Woo Seung-min, Kang Seong-beom, Jang Jae-young, Jung Youngguk, Sung Eun, Lee Ji-hyung, Seo Dan-bi, Im Jun-hyeok
080126	Ep. 52	Jo Hyung-ki, Boom, Kim Na-young, Jung Chan-woo and Kim Tae-gyun (Cultwo), Kim Jae-woo, Kim Tae-hwan, Kim Kyung-wook, Kim Bum-ryong, Kim Hyun-jung, Baek Bo-ram, Girls' Generation, Shindong (Super Junior)
080202	Ep. 53	Lunar New Year Special, Magic Battle Part 1: Jo Hyung-ki, Haha, Kim Na-young, Mithra Jin (Epik High), Park Mi-sun, Lu-Vada, SeeYa, Prof. Kim Jung Woo
080208	Bonus Ep.	Lunar New Year Special (Best of Star King)
080209	Ep. 54	Lunar New Year Special, Magic Battle Part 2: Jo Hyung-ki, Haha, Kim Na-young, Boom, Park Mi-sun, Mithra Jin (Epik High), Lu-Vada, SeeYa, Prof. Kim Jung Woo, Big Bang, Girls' Generation, Tae Jin-ah, LJ, Charles, Jo Se-ho, Jung Joo-ri, Lee Jae-hyung
080216	Ep. 55	Jo Hyung-ki, Haha, Boom, Kim Na-young, Big Bang, Girls' Generation, Tae Jin-ah, Charles, Jo Se-ho
080223	Ep. 56	Jo Hyung-ki, Boom, Kim Na-young, Andy (Shinhwa), Jewelry, Cho Won-seok, Kim Hak-do, Mithra Jin (Epik High), LJ
080301	Ep. 57	Jo Hyung-ki, Boom, Kim Na-young, Kim C (Hot Potato), KCM, Yoo Chae-yeong, LJ, Leeteuk and Eunhyuk (Super Junior)
080308	Ep. 58	Gayo Daejeon Special: Jo Hyung-ki, Park Sun-joo, Kim Jang-hoon, Jang Yoon-jung, Boom, Kim Na-young, Park Hyun-bin, Taeyeon (Girls' Generation), Ban Nam-gyu (Miracle)
080315	Ep. 59	Leeteuk and Eunhyuk (Super Junior), Yuri (Girls Generation), Ajoo, Boom, Lee Min-kyung, Jang Jae-young, Kim Heung-gook, Kang Seong-beom, Kim Ki-su, Ban Nam-gyu, Kim Na-young
080322	Ep. 60	Joo, Jo Hyung-ki, Boom, Andy (Shinhwa), Leeteuk and Eunhyuk (Super Junior), H-Eugene, Kim Na-young, Ahn Hye-kyung, LJ, Nam Bo-ra
080329	Ep. 61	Jo Hyung-ki, Ha Chun-hwa, Kim Hyun-chul, Boom, Kim Na-young, Leeteuk and Han Geng (Super Junior), Kim Jung-min, Djamilya Abdullaeva, Maydoni, Kang Ye-bin, LJ, Lee Yoon-ah, Kim Hwan, and Park Sun-young (SBS announcers)
080405	Ep. 62	Jo Hyung-ki, Boom, Kim Na-young, Leeteuk and Shindong (Super Junior), Lyn, SS501, Sunha, Yuri, Tiffany, and YoonA (Girls' Generation)
080412	Ep. 63	Boom, Kim Na-young, Leeteuk and Shindong (Super Junior), Yoon Hae-young, Jang Na-ra, Jewelry, Jeon Je-hyang, LJ, Kang Ye-bin
080426	Ep. 64	Jo Hyung-ki, Boom, Kim Na-young, Leeteuk and Shindong (Super Junior), Hwayobi, Andy (Shinhwa), Choi Jung-won (UN), Kyu-jong and Hyung-jun (SS501), Kim Jung-min, LJ
080503	Ep. 65	Children's Day Special: Jo Hyung-ki, MC Mong, Boom, Kim Na-young, Leeteuk and Shindong (Super Junior), Kyu-jong and Hyung-jun (SS501), Joo, Kang Ye-bin, Cheong Mi
080505	Special	Super Kid Prodigy
080510	Ep. 66	Park Sang-myun, MC Mong, Boom, Leeteuk and Shindong (Super Junior), H-Eugene, Moon Hee-joon, Solbi (Typhoon), Mira, Kang Ye-bin, Kim Na-young
080517	Ep. 67	Noh Sa-yeon, Park Sang-myun, MC Mong, Boom, Han Young, Kim Na-young, Choi Jung-won, Lexy, Jackson Hwang (Hwang Young-jin), Lee Yong-jin, Lee Jin-ho, Yang Se-chan, and Oh In-taek (UtChatSa's Woongi's Family)
080524	Ep. 68	Eunhyuk (Super Junior), Epik High, Jun Jin (Shinhwa), Solbi (Typhoon), MC Mong, Boom, Noh Sa-yeon, Park Sang-myun
080531	Ep. 69	Eunhyuk (Super Junior), Tim, MC Mong, Solbi (Typhoon), Boom, Saori, Mira, Kim Jang-hoon, Jeon Tae-kwan (SSAW), Noh Sa-yeon, Park Sang-myun
080607	Ep. 70	Kim Kyu-jong and Kim Hyung-jun (SS501), Eunhyuk (Super Junior), Solbi, MC Mong, Boom, Kim Ji-sun, Lee Yoon-seok, Lee Yong-jin, Lee Jin-ho, Yang Se-chan, and Oh In-taek (UtChatSa's Woongi's Family), Mira
080614	Ep. 71	Eunhyuk (Super Junior), Song Ho-bum and Oh Chang-hoon (One Two), Solbi, MC Mong, Boom, Park Hae-mi, Hong Ji-min, Park Nam-jung, Mira
080621	Ep. 72	Eunhyuk, Shindong, Sungmin, and Yesung (Super Junior), Solbi (Typhoon), MC Mong, Boom, Kim Dong-gyu, Koh Yu-jin, Lee Soo-geun, Chunja, Mira
080628	Ep. 73	Eunhyuk (Super Junior), Tae-hwa and Hwi-chan (Battle), Jun Jin (Shinhwa), Ock Joo-hyun, Boom, Solbi, Na Hyeon-hui, Mira
080705	Ep. 74	Jung Yoon-hak, Kim Kwang-soo, and Park Geon-il (Supernova), Solbi (Typhoon), Lee Mu-song, Koo Jun-yup, Lee Yong-jin, Lee Jin-ho, Yang Se-chan, and Oh In-taek (UtChatSa's Woongi's Family), Mira
080712	Ep. 75	Leeteuk and Eunhyuk (Super Junior), MC Mong, Boom, Solbi, Kim Hyun-joong, Park Hyun-bin, Park Young-rin
080719	Ep. 76	SHINee, MC Mong, Boom, Solbi, Kim Heung-gook, Bae Geu-rin, Namgyu
080726	Ep. 77	Wonder Girls, 2AM, Hong Kyung-min, MC Mong, Boom, Solbi
080802	Ep. 78	Eunhyuk, Shindong, Yesung, and Sungmin (Super Junior), MC Mong, Solbi
080809	Ep. 79	MC Mong, Solbi, Lee Ki Chan, Hwangbo
080816	Ep. 80	SHINee, MC Mong, Solbi, Boom, Park Sang-myun, Byun Jin-sub, Yoon Jung-soo, Han Young, Kim Yang-chul, Dongkwang
080830	Ep. 81	Kara, Jang Yoon Jung, Kim Sung Joo, Goo Joon Yeob, Solbi
080914	Ep. 82	World's Best Asia Festival: Recap of 080830-080906
080920	Ep. 83	Jo Kwon and Lim Seul-ong (2AM), Ahn Jin-kyung and Eun Ji (Baby Vox Re.V), Oh Jong-hyuk
080927	Ep. 84	Lee Hong-gi, Choi Min-hwan, and Choi Jong-hoon (FT Island), Younha, Solbi
081004	Ep. 85	2PM, Kangin (Super Junior), Dong Kwang, Solbi
081011	Ep. 86	Goo Hara and Han Seung-yeon (Kara), Kangin (Super Junior), Solbi
081018	Ep. 87	Kangin (Super Junior), Nichkhun and Jaebum (2PM), Gain and Narsha (Brown Eyed Girls)
081025	Ep. 88	Jo Kwon and Jinwoon (2AM), Son Ho-young, Mighty Mouth
081101	Ep. 89	Lee Hong-gi (FT Island), Kangin (Super Junior), Solbi
081108	Ep. 90	Best of Best Special: Charice Pempenco, Girls' Generation, Kangin
081115	Ep. 91	Kangin, Wheesung, Lee Min-woo, Crown J
081122	Ep. 92	XIA Junsu, Micky Yoochun, and Max Changmin (TVXQ), Kangin (Super Junior), Jaurim, Solbi, Dongkwang, Yoon Il-sang, Jo Hye-ryun
081129	Ep. 93	Lee Min-woo (Shinhwa), Kangin, Nichkhun (2PM), Kim Jong-kook, Wheesung, Solbi
081206	Ep. 94	Kangin (Super Junior), Kim Jong-kook, Eun Ji-won, Nichkhun (2PM), Solbi, Mighty Mouth
081213	Ep. 95	Nichkhun, Jaebum, Junsu, and Junho (2PM), Kangin (Super Junior), Black, Solbi, Baek Ji-young
081220	Ep. 96	Nichkhun (2PM), Kangin (Super Junior), Boom, Solbi
081227	Ep. 97	Nichkhun, Jaebum, Junho, Chansung, and Taekyeon (2PM), Kim Jong Jin and Jeon Tae Kwan (Spring, Summer, Fall & Winter), Kangin (Super Junior), Wheesung

== Episodes (2009) ==
List of episodes in 2009 (98-146)

Date	Episode	Guests
090103	Ep. 98	Daesung (Big Bang), Nichkhun (2PM), Kara, Solbi
090110	Ep. 99	Nichkhun, Chansung, and Jaebum (2PM)
090117	Ep. 100	Yuri, Sooyoung, Sunny, and Tiffany (Girls' Generation), Nichkhun (2PM), Solbi
090124	Ep. 101	Nichkhun (2PM), Baek Ji-young
090131	Ep. 102	Nichkhun (2PM), Kim Kyung-rok (V.O.S)
090207	Ep. 103	Nichkhun and Jaebum (2PM), Kara
090214	Ep. 104	Jaebum, Nichkhun, Changsun, and Wooyoung (2PM), Hwayobi
090221	Ep. 105	Jessica, Tiffany, Hyoyeon, Sunny, and Sooyoung (Girls' Generation), Nichkhun, Jaebum, Chansung, and Wooyoung (2PM)
090228	Ep. 106	Sooyoung, Tiffany, Sunny, Hyoyeon, and Jessica (Girls' Generation), Nichkhun and Jaebum (2PM)
090314	Ep. 107	Kim Kyu-jong and Kim Hyun-joong (SS501), Andy (Shinhwa), Nichkhun (2PM), Kim Ji Hye (Cats), Byul
090321	Ep. 108	Andy, Lee Hong-gi (FT Island), Nichkhun, Jaebum, Chansung, and Wooyoung (2PM), Kim Kyu-jong and Kim Hyung-joong (SS501)
090328	Ep. 109	Leeteuk, Han Geng, Yesung, Kangin, Sungmin, Eunhyuk, Donghae, Siwon, Ryeowook, and Kyuhyun (Super Junior), Lee Hong-gi and Song Seung-hyun (FT Island), Nichkhun (2PM)
090404	Ep. 110	Super Junior, Kibum, Alexander, and Eli (U-KISS), Nichkhun and Jaebum (2PM), Mika (Black Pearl)
090411	Ep. 111	Leeteuk and Eunhyuk (Super Junior), Nichkhun (2PM), Kibum, Alexander, and Eli (U-Kiss)
090418	Ep. 112	Nichkhun, Jaebum, and Taecyeon (2PM), Leeteuk, Eunhyuk, Sungmin, Donghae, Heechul, and Siwon (Super Junior)
090425	Ep. 113	Leeteuk, Eunhyuk, Sungmin, Donghae, and Heechul (Super Junior), Nichkhun, Jaebum, Taecyeon, and Wooyoung (2PM), U-Kiss
090502	Ep. 114	Leeteuk, Eunhyuk, Shindong, Sungmin, and Yesung (Super Junior), Nichkhun, Wooyoung, Taecyeon, and Junsu (2PM)
090509	Ep. 115	Leeteuk, Kangin, Han Geng, Eunhyuk, Sungmin, and Ryeowook (Super Junior), Nichkhun (2PM), Bae Seul-ki
090516	Ep. 116	Eunhyuk, Sungmin, Yesung, and Kangin (Super Junior), Nichkhun (2PM), Jo Kwon and Jinwoon (2AM), After School, Kim Hye-yeon
090530	Ep. 117	Leeteuk, Eunhyuk, Sungmin, and Yesung (Super Junior), Nichkhun (2PM), Choi Jung-won, Kim Si-hyang
090606	Ep. 118	Super Junior, 2PM, After School, Chae Yeon
090613	Ep. 119	Jaebeom, Junsu, Wooyoung, Taecyeon, Chansung, and Junho (2PM), Onew, Jonghyun, Key, and Minho (SHINee), Sung Jin-woo, Lee Ji-hye, Hong Jin-young
090620	Ep. 120	Jaebeom, Junsu, Wooyoung, Nichkhun, Chansung, and Junho (2PM), Solbi, Kim Yang-chul, Kang Han-seong, Hong Jin-young
090627	Ep. 121	Nichkhun, Junho, and Chansung (2PM), Uee (After School), Tae Jin-ah, Insooni, Lee Soo-young, Jang Young-ran
090704	Ep. 122	2PM, Uee (After School), Solbi
090711	Ep. 123	Onew, Jonghyun, Key, and Minho (SHINee), Moon Hee-joon, Uee (After School), Nichkhun (2PM), Lee Sang-min, Ko Young-wook, Kim Ji-hyun, Chae Ri-na (Roo'ra)
090718	Ep. 124	Nichkhun, Jaebeom and Wooyoung (2PM), SNSD, HyunA (4Minute), Uee (After School)
090725	Ep. 125	Nichkhun and Wooyoung (2PM), Onew, Jonghyun, Key, and Minho (SHINee), Uee (After School), Solbi, Kim Hyun-chul, Jo Won-seok, Kim Na-young
090801	Ep. 126	Sungmin, Donghae, and Eunhyuk (Super Junior), Nichkhun, Wooyoung, Junho, and Chansung (2PM), Uee (After School)
090815	Ep. 127	FT Island, After School, Brown Eyed Girls, Kangin, Leeteuk, Eunhyuk, and Shindong (Super Junior), Wooyoung and Nichkhun (2PM), MC Mong, Jo Kwon and Lim Seul-ong (2AM)
090822	Ep. 128	Kangin, Leeteuk, Eunhyuk, and Shindong (Super Junior), Nichkhun and Wooyoung (2PM), Jo Kwon (2AM), Gyuri, Nicole, Seungyeon, Hara, and Jiyoung, (KARA), Lee Hong-gi (FT Island), Uee (After School), Kim Young-chul, Ida Daussy
090829	Ep. 129	Kangin, Leeteuk, Eunhyuk, and Shindong (Super Junior), Nichkhun and Wooyoung (2PM), 2AM, KARA, Park Jung-ah (Jewelry), Uee (After School)
090905	Ep. 130	Leeteuk and Eunhyuk (Super Junior) Nichkhun (2PM), Jo Kwon, Seulong, and Jinwoon (2AM), KARA, Park Jung-ah (Jewelry), Uee (After School), Chae Yeon
090912	Ep. 131	Jessica, Yuri, Tiffany, and Sunny (Girls' Generation), Minho and Onew (SHINee), Jo Kwon (2AM), Tae Jin-ah, Kim Young-chul, Jo Hye-ryun, Hyun Jung-hwa
090919	Ep. 132	Jo Kwon (2AM), Jessica, Yuri, Tiffany, and Sunny (Girls' Generation), Minho and Onew (SHINee), Tae Jin-ah, Kim Young-chul, Jo Hye-ryun
090926	Ep. 133	Nichkhun and Wooyoung (2PM), T-ara, Leeteuk and Yesung (Super Junior), Clazziquai Project
091003	Ep. 134	Jo Kwon and Seulong (2AM), Hyomin, Jiyeon, and Eunjung (T-ara), SHINee, Tae Jin-ah, Joo Byeong-seon, Kyeon Mi-ri, Jo Hye-ryeon, Jang Yoon-jeong, Park Hyun-bin, Kim Young-chul, Ahn Young-mi, Jeong Gyeong-mi
091010	Ep. 135	Wooyoung and Nichkhun (2PM), Jo Kwon and Seulong (2AM), Eunjung and Hyomin (T-ara), Leeteuk and Eunhyuk (Super Junior), Alex and Horan (Clazziquai)
091017	Ep. 136	SHINee, Jo Kwon and Seulong (2AM), Jiyeon, Eunjung, and Hyomin (T-ara), Eunhyuk (Super Junior), Tei, Jo Hye-ryeon, Shin Young-hee, Lee Kyung-sil, Lee Seong-mi, Lee Bong-won, Kim Dong-hyun, Park Young-jin, Kim Young-chul, Ahn Young-mi, Jung Kyung-mi, Park Hyun-bin
091024	Ep. 137	Nichkhun and Wooyoung (2PM), Leeteuk and Eunhyuk (Super Junior), KARA, Brian Joo (Fly to the Sky), Jo Kwon and Seulong (2AM), Kim Tae-woo, T-ara
091031	Ep. 138	SHINee, Leeteuk and Eunhyuk (Super Junior), Kim Tae-woo, Brian (Fly to the Sky), Alex (Clazziquai), Park Gyu-ri, Han Seung-yeon, Goo Hara, and Kang Ji-young (KARA), Jo Kwon and Seulong (2AM), Kim Jong-seo, Nancy Lang, Han Chae-ah
091107	Ep. 139	SHINee, Leeteuk and Eunhyuk (Super Junior), Eunjung, Hyomin, and Jiyeon (T-ARA), Andy (Shinhwa), Hye-eun, Kim Hyun-chul, Han Chae-ah, Yang Jin-seok, Kim Dong-hyun
091114	Ep. 140	SS501, Leeteuk and Eunhyuk (Super Junior), Taemin and Minho (SHINee), Eunjung, Hyomin, and Jiyeon (T-ARA), MC Mong, Choi Jung-won, Lee Kwang-ki, Jang Keun-i
091121	Ep. 141	Leeteuk and Eunhyuk (Super Junior), Jonghyun, Key, Minho, and Taemin (SHINee), Eunjung, Hyomin, and Jiyeon (T-ARA), Yang Jin-seok, Kim Tae-woo, Choi Phillip, Choi Han-bit
091128	Ep. 142	SS501, Leeteuk and Eunhyuk (Super Junior), Minho and Taemin (SHINee), Jo Kwon (2AM), Hwanhee (Fly to the Sky), Jiyeon, Hyomin, and Eunjung (T-ARA), Yang Jin-seok, Choi Phillip, Choo So-young, Choi Han-bit, NS Yoon-G
091205	Ep. 143	Leeteuk and Eunhyuk (Super Junior), Yuri, Sunny, Jessica, and Tiffany (Girls' Generation), Onew, Key, Minho, and Taemin (SHINee), Jo Kwon (2AM), Eun Ji-won, Yang Jin-seok, Choi Phillip, Nancy Lang, Choi Hyun-woo, Shoo
091212	Ep. 144	Yuri, Sunny, Tiffany, and Jessica (Girls' Generation), Minho, Onew, Key, and Taemin (SHINee), Leeteuk and Eunhyuk (Super Junior), Jo Kwon (2AM), Hwanhee, Yang Jin-seok, Choi Phillip, Nancy Lang, Choi Hyun-woo, Park Joon-hyung, Jeong Jong-cheol, Oh Ji-heon
091219	Ep. 145	Year-End Special: Sungmin, Yesung, Shindong, and Leeteuk (Super Junior), Siwon, Donghae, Ryeowook, Kyuhyun, Henry, and Zhou Mi (Super Junior M), Onew, Key, Jonghyun, and Taemin (SHINee), Bekah, Jungah, Uee, and Kahi (After School), Nicole, Seungyeon, and Jiyoung (Kara), Hyomin and Eunjung (T-ara), Jo Kwon (2AM), Tae Jin-ah, Yang Jin-seok, Choi Phillip, Park Hyun-bin, Mina
091226	Ep. 146	Leeteuk and Eunhyuk (Super Junior), Siwon, Donghae, Ryeowook, Kyuhyun, Henry, and Zhou Mi (Super Junior M), SHINee, Bekah, Jungah, Uee, and Kahi (After School), Jo Kwon (2AM), Yang Jin-seok, Choi Phillip, Nancy Lang, NS Yoon-G, IU

== Episodes (2010) ==
List of episodes in 2010 (147-195)

100102	Ep. 147	Onew, Jonghyun, Minho, and Taemin (SHINee), Sooyoung, Sunny, Seohyun, Hyoyeon, and Yuri (Girls' Generation), Leeteuk and Eunhyuk (Super Junior), Kim Jong-min, Jo Kwon (2AM), Eun Ji-won, Yang Jin-seok, Choi Phillip, Nancy Lang
100109	Ep. 148	Onew, Jonghyun, Minho, and Taemin (SHINee), Sooyoung, Sunny, Seohyun, Hyoyeon, Yuri, and Jessica (Girls' Generation), Leeteuk, Eunhyuk, and Shindong (Super Junior), Jo Kwon (2AM), Yang Jin-seok, Choi Phillip, Nancy Lang, Lee Ha-yan
100116	Ep. 149	Onew, Jonghyun, Minho, and Taemin (SHINee), Brown Eyed Girls, Bekah, Kahi, Jungah, Nana, and Raina (After School), Eunjung and Hyomin (T-ara), Leeteuk and Eunhyuk (Super Junior), Jo Kwon (2AM), Yang Jin-seok, Choi Phillip, Nancy Lang
100123	Ep. 150	Key, Minho, Taemin, and Jonghyun (SHINee), Leeteuk and Eunhyuk (Super Junior), Kim Jong-min, 4Minute, Eunjeong and Hyomin (T-ara), Sunwoo Yong-nyeo, Yang Jin-seok, Choi Phillip, Nancy Lang
100130	Ep. 151	Minho, Taemin, KEY, and Jonghyun (SHINee), Taeyeon, Jessica, Tiffany, Sunny, Yuri, Sooyoung, Hyoyeon, and Seohyun (Girls' Generation), 4Minute, Leeteuk and Eunhyuk (Super Junior), Eunjung and Hyomin (T-ara), Sunwoo Yong-nyeo, Yang Jin-seok, Choi Phillip, Nancy Lang, Kim Byung-jun
100205	Ep. 152	Jessica (Girls' Generation), Doojoon, Hyunseung, Yoseob, Junhyung, and Dongwoon (BEAST), Leeteuk and Eunhyuk (Super Junior), Jo Kwon (2AM)
100213	Ep. 153	Girls' Generation, Jonghyun, Minho, Taemin, and KEY (SHINee), Brown Eyed Girls, Eunjung and Hyomin (T-ara), Doojoon, Yoseob, Hyunseung, Junhyung, and Dongwoon (BEAST), Leeteuk and Eunhyuk (Super Junior), Jo Kwon (2AM), Tae Jin-ah, Yang Jin-seok, Choi Phillip, Nancy Lang, Kim Mi-yeon, Kim Se-hwang
100220	Ep. 154	Yuri and Jessica (Girls' Generation), Jonghyun, Key, Minho, and Taemin (SHINee), 4Minute, Eunjung and Hyomin (T-ara), Leeteuk and Eunhyuk (Super Junior), Jo Kwon (2AM), MBLAQ, Mighty Mouth, Kim Jong-kook, Yu Jin-ah
100227	Ep. 155	Yuri and Jessica (Girls' Generation), Kara, Mighty Mouth, Jo Kwon and Changmin (2AM), MBLAQ, Han Sun-hwa (Secret), Kim Jong-min (Koyote), Leeteuk and Eunhyuk (Super Junior)
100306	Ep. 156	Yuri, Jessica, and Yoona (Girls' Generation), Kara, U-Kiss, MBLAQ, BEAST, 2AM, Krystal (f(x)), Han Sun-hwa (Secret), Leeteuk and Eunhyuk (Super Junior), Min Kyung-hoon (Buzz), Shin Ji (Koyote), Brian Joo
100313	Ep. 157	Yuri and Jessica (Girls' Generation), Leeteuk, Eunhyuk, and Shindong (Super Junior), Onew, Jonghyun, Minho, and Taemin (SHINee), Jo Kwon, Jin-woon, and Changmin (2AM), MBLAQ, KARA, Eunjung and Hyomin (T-ara), Krystal (f(x)), Bekah, Kahi, Jungah, Nana, and Raina (After School), Alexander, Kevin Woo, Eli Kim, Kibum, Soohyun, and Lee Ki-seop (U-KISS), ZE:A, Brian Joo, Han Sunhwa (Secret), Mighty Mouth, Choi Hyun Woo, Jeong Ga-eun, Shin Ji and Kim Jong-min (Koyote)
100320	Ep. 158	Yuri and Jessica (SNSD), Kara, Onew, Jonghyun, Minho, and Taemin (SHINee), Jinwoon, Jo Kwon, and Changmin (2AM), Bekah, Kahi, Jungah, Nana, and Raina (After School), Alexander, Kevin, Eli, Kibum, Soohyun, and Lee Ki-seop (U-KISS), MBLAQ, Krystal (f(x)), Eunjung and Hyomin (T-ara), Leeteuk, Eunhyuk, and Shindong (Super Junior), ZE:A, Sunhwa (Secret), Kim Jong Kook, Mighty Mouth
100327	Ep. 159	Leeteuk, Eunhyuk, and Shindong (Super Junior), Sunny and Hyoyeon (SNSD), Mir and G.O (MBLAQ), U-Kiss, T-ara, Krystal, Victoria, and Luna (f(x)), Gwang Hee and Dong Joon (ZE:A), Kim Jong Kook, Brian Joo, Sunhwa (Secret)
100403	Ep. 160	Leeteuk and Eunhyuk (Super Junior), Yoona, Yuri, and Jessica (SNSD), Jo Kwon (2AM), Jonghyun, KEY, Minho, and Taemin (SHINee), Doojoon, Yoseob, Hyunseung, Junhyung, and Dongwoon (BEAST), Eunjung and Hyomin (T-ara), 4Minute, Alexander, Kevin, Eli, Kibum, Soohyun, and Kiseop (U-Kiss), Brian Joo, Sunhwa (Secret), Kim Jong Kook, Mighty Mouth
100410	Ep. 161	Yuri, Jessica, Sooyoung, Sunny, and Hyoyeon (SNSD), Taemin and Minho (SHINee), Alexander and Kevin (U-Kiss), Mir and G.O (MBLAQ), T-ara, Kwanghee and Dongjun (ZE:A), Leeteuk and Eunhyuk (Super Junior), Han Sunhwa (Secret), Wink, f(x), Wangbae
100501	Ep. 162	Leeteuk and Eunhyuk (Super Junior), Jonghyun, Key, Minho, and Taemin (SHINee), Yuri, Jessica, and Sooyoung (SNSD), Jo Kwon (2AM), Kim Tae Woo, Eunjung, Hyomin, and Jiyeon (T-ara), Kwanghee and Dongjun (ZE:A), Alexander and Kevin (U-Kiss)
100508	Ep. 163	Eunhyuk and Leeteuk (Super Junior), Taemin and Minho (SHINee), f(x), G.O and Mir (MBLAQ), Alexander and Kevin (U-KISS), Kwanghee and Dongjun (ZE:A), T-ara, Wink, Han Sunhwa (Secret)
100515	Ep. 164	Leeteuk and Eunhyuk (Super Junior), Taemin and Minho (SHINee), f(x), Mir and G.O (MBLAQ), Kwanghee and Dongjun (ZE:A), Alexander and Kevin (U-Kiss), Han Sunhwa (Secret)
100522	Ep. 165	Super Junior, G.O and Mir (MBLAQ), Victoria, Krystal, and Luna (f(x)), Kwanghee and Dongjoon (ZE:A), Alexander and Kevin (U-Kiss)
100529	Ep. 166	Leeteuk and Eunhyuk (Super Junior), Nichkhun and Chansung (2PM), G.O and Mir (MBLAQ), Victoria and Luna (f(x)), Kwanghee and Dongjoon (ZE:A), Alexander and Kevin (U-Kiss), Han Sunhwa (Secret)
100605	Ep. 167	Super Junior (Lee Teuk, Eunhyuk, Shindong, Sungmin, Donghae, Kyuhyun, Yesung), Nich Khun & Woo Young & Chan Sung (2PM), f(x), G.O & Mir (MBLAQ), Ga Hee & Na Na & Raina & Lizzy (After School), Kwang Hee & Dong Joon (ZE:A), Alexander & Kevin (U-Kiss), Han Sun Hwa (Secret), Wink, Maya, etc.
100619	Ep. 168	Super Junior (Lee Teuk, Eunhyuk, Shindong, Sungmin, Donghae, Kyuhyun, Yesung), Nichkhun & Wooyoung & Chansung (2PM), Gahee & Nana & Raina & Lizzy (After School), Alexander & Kevin (U-Kiss), G.O & Mir (MBLAQ), Han Sun Hwa (Secret), Kwanghee & Dongjoon (Ze:a), etc.
100626	Ep. 169	Taemin & Minho (SHINee), Jokwon (2AM), Wooyoung (2PM), BEAST, Leeteuk & Eunhyuk (Super Junior), Luna & Victoria & Sulli (f(x)), T-ara, Secret, G.O & Mir (MBLAQ), Wink, Alexander & Kevin (U-Kiss), Gwanghee & Dongjoon (Ze:a), etc.
100703	Ep. 170	Wooyoung, Junho, Chansung (2PM), Leeteuk, Eunhyuk (Super Junior), MBLAQ, f(x), Alexander, Kevin (U-Kiss), Secret, X-Cross, Sugar Boy, Kwang Hee, Dong Joon (ZE:A), etc.
100710	Ep. 171	Chansung & Wooyoung (2PM), f(x), Secret, Mir & G.O (MBLAQ), Gwanghee & Dongjoon (Ze:A), Alexander & Kevin (U-Kiss), Leeteuk & Eunhyuk & Shindong (Super Junior), etc.
100717	Ep. 172	CNBLUE, Onew & Jonghyun & Key & Taemin (SHINee), Sooyoung & Sunny & Yuri (SNSD), Victoria & Luna (f(x)), Leeteuk & Eunhyuk & Shindong (Super Junior), Kim Jong Min, Wink, Han Sun Hwa (Secret), etc.
100724	Ep. 173	Leeteuk & Eunhyuk & Shindong (Super Junior), Nichkhun & Junho & Chansung (2PM), CNBLUE, SHINee (without Minho), Victoria & Sulli & Luna (f(x)), 4Minute, G.O & Mir (MBLAQ), Han Sun Hwa (Secret), Alexander & Kevin & Eli & Kibum & Kisub (U-Kiss), Gwanghee & Dongjoon (Zea), Charice, Sugarboy, X-cross, etc.
100731	Ep. 174	f(x) (Victoria, Luna), SNSD (Sooyoung, Yuri, Yoona, Jessica, Sunny, Taeyeon), SHINee (Onew, Taemin), 2AM, 4Minute, MBLAQ (G.O, Mir), Ze:A (Gwanghee, Dongjoon), Super Junior (Leeteuk, Eunhyuk, Shindong), Secret (Han Sun Hwa), U-Kiss, Park Hyun Bin, Sistar, etc.
100807	Ep. 175	SHINee (Onew, Taemin), Super Junior (Leeteuk, Eunhyuk), MBLAQ (G.O, Mir), Ze:A (Gwanghee, Dongjoon), U-Kiss (Alexander, Kevin), etc.
100814	Ep. 176	Super Junior (Lee Teuk & Eun Hyuk), SNSD (Yuri, Jessica & Soo Young), SHINee, CN Blue (Jung Shin), MBLAQ, f(x), Brown Eyed Girls (Je Ah & Ga In), U-Kiss (Alexander & Kevin), The Boss (Ka Ram & Jay), miss A, ZE:A (Kwang Hee, Dong Joon), Rainbow, Han Sun Hwa (Secret), Julian Kang, Park Hyun Bin, Alex (Claaziquai), Chae Yeon, Koyote, etc.
100821	Ep. 177	Lee Teuk (Super Junior), SHINee, SNSD, CNBLUE (Jung Shin), MBLAQ, f(x) (Victoria & Luna), U-Kiss (Alexander & Kevin), The Boss (Ka Ram & Jay), miss A, Sistar, ZE:A (Kwang Hee, Dong Joon), 2AM, Brown Eyed Girls (Je Ah & Ga In), Rainbow, Sun Hwa (Secret), Park Hyun Bin, Chae Yeon, etc.
100828	Ep. 178	SHINee, Super Junior (Lee Teuk & Eun Hyuk), MBLAQ, f(x) (Victoria & Luna), Lee Jung Shin (CN Blue), U-Kiss (Alexander & Kevin), Brown Eyed Girls (Je Ah & Ga In), The Boss / D-NA (Karam & Jay), miss A, ZE:A (Kwang Hee & Dong Joon), Rainbow, Secret, Seo In-young, Rottyful Sky, etc.
100904	Ep. 179	Lee Teuk (Super Junior), SHINee (Onew), SNSD (Sunny & Hyoyeon), f(x) (Victoria & Luna), U-Kiss (Alexander & Kevin), Lee Jung Shin (CN Blue), 2AM, MBLAQ (G.O & Mir), Sistar, ZE:A (Kwang Hee & Dong Joon), Rottyful Sky, Han Sun Hwa (Secret), Mighty Mouth, Park Hyun Bin, Seo In-young, Kan Mi Yeon, etc.
100911	Ep. 180	SHINee, SNSD, f(x) (Victoria, Luna), CNBLUE (Jungshin), MBLAQ (G.O, Mir), Rainbow (Jaekyung, Jisook, Seunga, Yoon Hye), Ze:A (Kwanghee, Dongjoon), D-NA (Karam, Jay), U-Kiss (Alexander), Super Junior (Leeteuk, Shindong), Secret (Hyosun, Sunhwa), Chae Yeon, Kan Mi Yeon, GP Basic (Jenny, Trinity), etc.
100918	Ep. 181	SHINee, Lee Teuk (Super Junior), MBLAQ (G.O, Mir), miss A, Wheesung, Kim Jae Kyung (Rainbow), Alexander (U-Kiss), Mighty Mouth, Jang Yoon Jung, etc.
100925	Ep. 182	2PM (Junho, Chansung), Super Junior (Lee Teuk, Eun Hyuk), SNSD, SHINee, MBLAQ (G.O, Mir), f(x) (Victoria, Luna), miss A, Lee Jung Shin (CN Blue), Kim Jae Kyung (Rainbow), ZE:A (Kwanghee, Dong Joon), Sun Hwa (Secret), U-Kiss (Alexander & Kevin), GP Basic (Janey, Trinity), X-Cross, Jay (D-NA), Wheesung, Julien Kang, Park Hyun Bin, Philip Choi, Alex (Clazziquai), etc.
101002	Ep. 183	Super Junior (Lee Teuk & Eun Hyuk), SHINee (Jonghyun, Key & Minho), MBLAQ (G.O & Mir), f(x) (Victoria & Luna), Lee Jung Shin (CN Blue), U-Kiss (Alexander & Kevin), ZE:A (Kwang Hee & Dong Joon), miss A, Jay (D-NA), Kim Jae Kyung (Rainbow), Han Sun Hwa (Secret), GP Basic (Janey & Trinity), Rottyful Sky, Wink, Mighty Mouth, Jang Yoon Jung, Seo In-young, etc.
101009	Ep. 184	Super Junior (Lee Teuk, Eun Hyuk, Ye Sung, Shin Dong, Sung Min, Dong Hae, Kyu Hyun), SNSD, SHINee, 2AM, F.T. Island, MBLAQ (G.O, Mir), f(x) (Victoria, Luna), After School (Ga Hee, Nana, Raina, Lizzy), U-Kiss (Alexander & Kevin), miss A, Sistar, Lee Jung Shin (CN Blue), ZE:A (Kwang Hee, Dong Joon), Kim Jae Kyung (Rainbow), Han Sun Hwa (Secret), Park Hyun Bin, Maya, Kan Mi Yeon, etc.
101016	Ep. 185	SHINee (Onew, Key, Minho), MBLAQ (G.O, Mir), Alexander (U-Kiss), FT Island, Lee Teuk (Super Junior), miss A, Hwang Kwang Hee (ZE:A), Kim Jae Kyung (Rainbow), Secret, Mighty Mouth, etc.
101023	Ep. 186	FT Island, SHINee (Onew, Key, Minho), Super Junior (Leeteuk, Eunhyuk, Sungmin), MBLAQ (G.O, Mir), Secret, Lee Jung Shin (CN Blue), ZE:A (Kwang Hee, Dong Joon), Kim Jae Kyung (Rainbow), miss A (Jia, Min, Fei), U-Kiss (Alexander), Mighty Mouth, etc.
101030	Ep. 187	FT Island, SHINee (Onew, Key, Minho), Super Junior (Leeteuk, Eunhyuk, Sungmin), MBLAQ (G.O, Mir), Secret, Lee Jung Shin (CN Blue), ZE:A (Kwang Hee, Dong Joon), Kim Jae Kyung (Rainbow), miss A (Jia, Min, Fei), Co-Ed, U-Kiss (Alexander), IU, San.E, Mighty Mouth, etc.
101106	Ep. 188	2PM (Junsu, Nichkhun, Wooyoung, Junho), Super Junior (Leeteuk, Eunhyuk), SHINee (Key, Minho), Hongki (FT Island), MBLAQ, Alexander (U-Kiss), missA, Orange Caramel, Lee Jung Shin (CN Blue), ZE:A (Kwang Hee), Kim Jae Kyung (Rainbow), N.S Yoon Ji, San E, Mighty Mouth, Outsider, etc.
101113	Ep. 189	2PM, SHINee (Key, Minho), Super Junior (Leeteuk, Eunhyuk), missA, Orange Caramel, Alexander (U-Kiss), Lee Jung Shin (CN Blue), ZE:A (Kwang Hee), Co-Ed, Kim Jae Kyung (Rainbow), N.S Yoon Ji, San E, etc.
101120	Ep. 190	2PM, SHINee (Onew, Key, Minho), F.T. Island, Super Junior (Leeteuk, Eunhyuk), MBLAQ (G.O, Mir), miss A, Co-Ed, Sistar, Secret, Alexander (U-Kiss), Lee Jung Shin (CN Blue), ZE:A (Kwang Hee), Co-Ed, Kim Jae Kyung (Rainbow), San E, etc.
101127	Ep. 191	SNSD, Super Junior (Leeteuk, Eunhyuk), SHINee (Key, Minho), Lee Hongki (FT Island), MBLAQ (G.O, Mir), miss A, Sistar, Alexander (U-Kiss), Lee Jung Shin (CN Blue), ZE:A (Kwang Hee), Kim Jae Kyung (Rainbow), etc.
101204	Ep. 192	Super Junior (Leeteuk, Sungmin), SNSD, Mighty Mouth, SHINee (Key, Minho), MBLAQ (G.O, Mir), Kim Jae Kyung (Rainbow), CNBLUE (Jungshin), Miss A (Jia, Min, Fei)
101211	Ep. 193	Super Junior (Leeteuk, Eunhyuk), SNSD, SHINee (Onew, Key, Minho), KARA, miss A, Orange Caramel, Lee Jung Shin (CN Blue), Kim Jae Kyung (Rainbow), Raccoon (F1RST), Sori, etc.
101218	Ep. 194	Super Junior (Leeteuk, Eunhyuk), SHINee (Onew, Key, Minho, Taemin), miss A (Jia, Fei, Min), CNBLUE (Lee Jung Shin), Rainbow (Kim Jae Kyung), MBLAQ (G.O & Mir), Mighty Mouth, ), etc.
−101225

== Episodes (2011) ==
List of episodes in 2011 (196-

110101	Ep. 196	SHINee (Onew, Key, Minho), Kara, T-ara (Boram, Hyomin, Qri, Soyeon, Hwayoung), Super Junior (Leeteuk, Eunhyuk), MBLAQ (G.O, Mir), Secret, Orange Caramel, Sistar, F.Cuz, Coed, Son Dam bi, Jung Yeob, Tim, Park Hyun Bin, Wink, Mighty Mouth
110108	Ep. 197	MBLAQ (G.O, Mir), CNBLUE (Jungshin), Miss A (Jia, Min, Fei), Sistar, T-ara, Rainbow (Jaekyung), Super Junior (Sungmin, Leeteuk), Mighty Mouth, F.Cuz, Co-ed, Son Dam bi, Kim Jong Min, NS Yoonji, etc.
110115	Ep. 198	Kara (Gyuri, Seungyeon, Hara, Jiyoung), MBLAQ (G.O), T-ara (Boram, Hyomin, Qri, Soyeon, Hwayoung), Rainbow (Jaekyung), CNBLUE (Jungshin), F.Cuz, Miss A (Jia, Min, Fei), Sistar, Co-ed, Super Junior (Leeteuk, Eunhyuk), Mighty Mouth, Son Dam bi, NS Yoonji, Kim Jong Min
110122	Ep. 199	SHINee (Onew, Key), SNSD, MBLAQ (Seungho, G.O, Leejoon, Mir), Jungshin (CN Blue), Orange Caramel (Nana, Raina), Sistar, Jaekyung (Rainbow), Sori, NS Yoonji, Mighty Mouth, Tim, Leeteuk (Super Junior), Son Dam bi, Shim Hyung Rae
110129	Ep. 200	Super Junior (Leeteuk, Yesung, Sungmin), SNSD (Tiffany), 2PM (Junho, Chansung), MBLAQ (G.O, Mir), f(x) (Victoria, Luna), Rainbow (Jaekyung), Sistar (Bora, Hyorin), Mighty Mouth, Son Dam bi, Jung Ga Eun, Kim In Hye, Yiruma
110204	Ep. 200.5	Lunar New Year Special: Voice King
110205	Ep. 201	Super Junior (Leeteuk, Yesung, Sungmin), Son Dam bi, SNSD (Tiffany), 2PM (Junho, Chansung), Park Jung Min (SS501), f(x) (Victoria, Luna), MBLAQ (G.O, Mir), Sistar, Jaekyung (Rainbow), Secret (Sunhwa, Hyoseong), Dong Ho (U-Kiss), Lee Hyun (8eight), Tim, Moon Hee Jun, Yiruma
110212	Ep. 202	Super Junior (Leeteuk, Eunhyuk), 2PM, SHINee (Key, Minho), MBLAQ, Dongho (U-Kiss), Orange Caramel, Sistar, Son Dam bi, Secret (Sunhwa, Hyoseong), Jaekyung (Rainbow), Jungshin (CN Blue), NS Yoon Ji, San E, Tim, Moon Hee Jun
110219	Ep. 203	Leeteuk (Super Junior), Park Jung Min, Son Dam bi, MBLAQ (G.O, Mir), Dongho (U-Kiss), Sistar (Bora, Hyorin, Su Yoo), Lee Hyun (8eight), Secret (Sunhwa, Hyoseong), Jaekyung (Rainbow), Jewelry, Moon Hee Jun, Tim, etc.
110226	Ep. 204	Leeteuk (Super Junior), MBLAQ (G.O, Mir), Dongho (U-Kiss), Secret (Sunhwa, Hyoseong), Sistar (Bora, Hyorin, Su Yoo), Jaekyung (Rainbow), Jewelry, Moon Hee Jun, Tim, Norazo, etc.
110305	Ep. 205	Leeteuk (Super Junior), SHINee (Onew, Key, Minho, Taemin), MBLAQ (G.O, Mir), Jungshin (CN Blue), Miss A (Jia, Min, Fei), Infinite (Dongwoo, Woohyun, Sungjong), Son Dam bi, Dongho (U-Kiss), Secret (Sunhwa, Hyoseong), Jaekyung (Rainbow), Jewelry, Norazo, Tim, Moon Hee Jun, etc.
110312	Ep. 206	Leeteuk (Super Junior), Son Dam bi, G.O (MBLAQ), Dongho (U-Kiss), Infinite (Woohyun, Seongyeol, Sungjong), Secret (Sunhwa, Hyoseong), Jaekyung (Rainbow), Kim Tae Woo, Tim, Moon Hee Jun, Kan Mi Yeon, Jewelry, Girls Day, Norazo, etc.
110319	Ep. 207	Leeteuk (Super Junior), MBLAQ (G.O, Mir), Infinite (Woohyun, Sungyeol, Sungjong), Sistar, Son Dam bi, Secret (Sunhwa, Hyoseong), Jaekyung (Rainbow), Jewelry, Girl's Day, Dongho (U-Kiss), Moon Hee Jun, Kan Mi Yeon, Kim Tae Woo, Tim, Mighty Mouth, etc.
110326	Ep. 208	Leeteuk (Super Junior), SNSD (Sooyoung & Sunny), After School (Gahee, Nana), MBLAQ, Son Dam bi, Kwanghee (ZE:A), Infinite (Dongwoo, Woohyun, Sungyeol, Sungjong), Dongho (U-Kiss), Sistar, Secret (Sunhwa, Hyoseong), Jaekyung (Rainbow), Jewelry, Girl's Day (Ji Hae, Min Ah, Hyeri), Moon Hee Jun, Kan Mi Yeon, Kim Tae Woo, Tim, etc.
110402	Ep. 209	Leeteuk (Super Junior), Son Dam bi, MBLAQ (G.O, Leejoon), 2AM (Jinwoon, Changmin), Infinite (Woohyun, Sungjong), Secret (Sunhwa, Hyoseong), Jaekyung (Rainbow), Girl's Day (Min Ah, Haeri), Jewelry, Insooni, Moon Hee Jun, Tim, etc.
110409	Ep. 210	Leeteuk (Super Junior), Son Dam bi, MBLAQ (G.O, Mir), After School (Gahee, Nana), Dongho (U-Kiss), Kwanghee (ZE:A), Infinite (Woohyun, Sungyeol, Sungjong), G.NA, Sistar, Secret (Sunhwa, Hyoseong), Jaekyung (Rainbow), Girl's Day, Jewelry, Kim Tae Woo, Moon Hee Jun, Tim, Norazo, etc.
110416	Ep. 211	Leeteuk (Super Junior), Son Dam bi, SHINee (Onew, Key), CN Blue, MBLAQ (G.O, Leejoon), Dongho (U-Kiss), Infinite (Dongwoo, Woohyun, Sungjong), Brian Joo, Secret (Sunhwa, Hyoseong), Jaekyung (Rainbow), Sori, Han Groo, Jewelry, Clover, Moon Hee Jun, Tim, Park Hyun Bin, etc.
110423	Ep. 212	Leeteuk (Super Junior), Son Dam bi, CN Blue, MBLAQ, Lee Hyun (8eight), Infinite (Woohyun, Sungjong), Dongho (U-Kiss), Sistar (Soyu, Bora, Dasom), Secret (Sunhwa, Hyoseong), Jaekyung (Rainbow), Sori, NS Yoonji, Han Groo, Moon Hee Jun, Jewelry, Tim, Park Hyun Bin, etc.
110430	Ep. 213	Leeteuk (Super Junior), Son Dam bi, Kim Hyung Jun (SS501), MBLAQ (G.O, Leejoon), Infinite (Woohyun, Sungyeol, Sungjong), G.NA, Dongho (U-Kiss), Secret (Sunhwa, Hyoseong), Jaekyung (Rainbow), Girl's Day (Ji Hae, Min Ah, Haeri), Brian Joo, M4, Moon Hee Jun, Clover, Jewelry, Tim, Sori, Han Groo, etc.
110507	Ep. 214	Leeteuk (Super Junior), Son Dam bi, SHINee (Onew, Key), Kim Hyung Jun (SS501), MBLAQ (G.O, Leejoon), 4Minute, Brian Joo, Kim Tae Woo, Infinite (Dongwoo, Woohyun, Sungjong, L), Dongho (U-Kiss), Ze:A (Kwanghee, Siwan), Secret (Sunhwa, Hyoseong), Jaekyung (Rainbow), Girl's Day (Ji Hae, Min Ah, Yoora, Haeri), Tae Jin Ah, M4, Moon Hee Jun, Clover, Jewelry, Tim, Sori, etc.
110514	Ep. 215	Leeteuk (Super Junior), Son Dam bi, Kim Hyung Jun (SS501), Dongho (U-Kiss), Infinite (Woohyun, Sungjong, L), f(x), Jaekyung (Rainbow), Girl's Day (Ji Hae, Yoora, Haeri), Tony An, Moon Hee Jun, Tim, Chun Myung Hoon, Kim Jong Min, Jewelry, Tae Jin Ah, M4, etc.
110521	Ep. 216	Leeteuk (Super Junior), Son Dam bi, Kim Hyung Jun (SS501), After School, Dongho (U-Kiss), Infinite (Woohyun, Sungjong, L), Jaekyung (Rainbow), Girl's Day (Ji Hae, Yoora, Haeri), Tony An, Moon Hee Jun, Tim, Chun Myung Hoon, Kim Jong Min, Jewelry, Tae Jin Ah, M4, An Young Mi, Mighty Mouth, etc.
110528	Ep. 217	Super Junior (Leeteuk, Yesung), Son Dam bi, Heo Young Saeng (SS501), Infinite (Woohyun, Sungjong, L), Jaekyung (Rainbow), Girl's Day (Ji Hae, Yoora, Haeri), A Pink, Tony An, Moon Hee Jun, Chun Myung Hoon, Kim Jong Min, Turtles, Tim, etc.
110604	Ep. 218	Best of Star King
110611	Ep. 219	Girl's Day (Minah, Yoora, Haeri), etc.
110618	Ep. 220	Leeteuk (Super Junior), FT Island, After School (Bekah, Gahee, Jungah, Uee, Nana, Raina, Leeyoung), f(x) (Amber, Luna), Dongho (U-Kiss), Infinite (Woohyun, Sungjong, L), Secret (Sunhwa, Zinger), Jaekyung (Rainbow), Girl's Day (Minah, Yoora, Haeri), Kim Wan Sun, Moon Hee Jun, Chun Myung Hoon, Alex, Jewelry, etc.
110625	Ep. 221	Leeteuk (Super Junior), Kim Hyung Joon (SS501), Heo Young Saeng (SS501), Jang Woo Hyuk, f(x) (Amber, Luna), Dongho (U-Kiss), Infinite (Woohyun, Sungjong, L), Secret (Sunhwa, Zinger), Jaekyung (Rainbow), Girl's Day (Minah, Yoora, Haeri), Son Dam bi, Tae Jin Ah, M4, Moon Hee Jun, Chun Myung Hoon, Turtles, Alex, Jewelry, etc.
110702	Ep. 222	Leeteuk (Super Junior), f(x) (Victoria, Amber, Luna), After School (Bekah, Gahee, Jungah, Uee, Nana, Raina, Leeyoung), Infinite (Woohyun, Sungjong, L), Dongho (U-Kiss), Secret (Sunhwa, Zinger), Jaekyung (Rainbow), Girl's Day (Minah, Yoora, Haeri), Son Dam bi, Ahn Jung Hoon, Kim Wan Sun, Moon Hee Jun, Chun Myung Hoon, Alex, Jewelry
110709	Ep. 223	Nichkhun, Junho, and Chansung (2PM), T-ara, Jaekyung (Rainbow), Sunhwa (Secret), Woohyun, Sungjong, and L (Infinite), Minah, Yoora, and Hyeri (Girl's Day), Son Dam bi, Chun Myung Hoon, Alex
110716	Ep. 224	Super Junior, f(x), Mighty Mouth, Infinite, Girl's Day, Rainbow, Alex, Jang Woo Hyuk, 2PM, Jewelry, Secret
110723	Ep. 225	Jo Hye-ryun, Yang Jin-seok, Chun Myung-hoon, Jeong Sia, Alex, Ahn Young-mi, Leeteuk, Shindong, Eunhyuk, and Kyuhyun (Super Junior), Taecyeon and Wooyoung (2PM), Han Sun-hwa and Jeon Hyosung (Secret), Kim Jae-kyung, Victoria, Amber, Luna, and Sulli (f(x)), Jihae, Minah, and Hyeri (Girl's Day), Nam Woo-hyun and Lee Seong-jong (Infinite)
