= Kim Hyun-chul =

- Hangul: 김현철
- RR: Gim Hyeoncheol
- MR: Kim Hyŏnch'ŏl

Kim Hyun-chul (Korean: 김현철) is a Korean name consisting of the family name Kim and the given name Hyun-chul, and may also refer to:

- Kim Hyun-chul (politician) (1901-1989), South Korean politician
- Kim Hyun-chul (born 1959) (1959-), South Korean politician, academic, son of president Kim Young-sam
- Kim Hyun-chul (singer) (born 1969), South Korean singer
- Kim Hyun-chul (comedian) (born 1970), South Korean comedian
