= Kang Byung-kyu =

South Korean baseball player and broadcaster

- 강병규
- Born: May 20, 1972 (age 53); South Korea
- Occupations: Baseballer; Broadcaster
- Years active: 2000–present

Kang Byung-kyu (born May 20, 1972) is a South Korean former baseball player and broadcaster.

== Career ==
Kang started his baseball career while he was attending to Sungnam High School in the 1990s. He joined the Doosan Bears in 1991.

Following his retirement in 2001, Kang started a new life as a broadcaster. From 2005 to 2006, he was one of co-emcees of Crisis Escape No. 1, along with Lee Hyuk-jae. Both received an appreciation plaque from the Ministry of Labour in 2006. He also hosted Vitamin till 2008 when he resigned after a controversy related to the 2008 Summer Olympics.

Though being inactive for several years, in 2015, he showed his intention to not return for TV broadcasting. Instead, he officially returned as an online broadcaster in 2018. In 2019, he attended to a protest supporting Cho Kuk as the Minister of Justice.

== Controversies ==
Kang was widely accused in 2008 when he was reported for gambling at the Philippines. He admitted the incident a month before he was arrested.

In 2020, Kang provoked a controversy when he made a defamatory remark against Yoon Chung-ja, whose son (Min Pyung-ki) was victimised at ROKS Cheonan sinking 10 years ago. The controversial remark was written on his Twitter on 29 March, 3 days after when Yoon asked Moon to explain about who had occurred the tragedy.

I was shocked when I saw an old lady set herself against the President Moon.
All of the minders should be fired immediately.

Also, a background check must be done to dig out her past and don't forget to punish her.

It was an emergency situation that she could spread coronaviruses to the President.

Don't feel sympathy.

Dear Blue House, please show her that she could die if she treats others so easy.

== Filmography ==
=== Variety show ===
- Super TV Sunday is Fun
- Sunday is 101%
- Freedom Declaration — Saturday War
- Crisis Escape No. 1
- Vitamin
- Good Buddies
- 1000 Song Challenge
