= Hyun-chul =

- Hangul: 현철
- RR: Hyeoncheol
- MR: Hyŏnch'ŏl

Hyun-chul (Korean: 현철) is a Korean masculine given name. As of 2026, the name ranked 1,757nd out of 36,179 male names. A total of 124 people, all of whom were male, were born with the name from 2008 to 2026.

Notable people with the name include:

- Kim Hyun-chul (comedian), South Korean comedian
- Kim Hyun-chul (politician), South Korean politician and activist
- Hwang Hyun-chul, South Korean martial artist
- Seo Hyun-chul, South Korean actor
- Cho Hyun-chul, South Korean actor
- Lim Hyun-chul, South Korean amateur boxer

Fictional characters include:

- Song Hyun-chul, portrayed by Kim Myung-min, the protagonist of The Miracle We Met

== See also ==
- List of Korean given names
