= Lady Jane (singer) =

South Korean singer (born 1984)

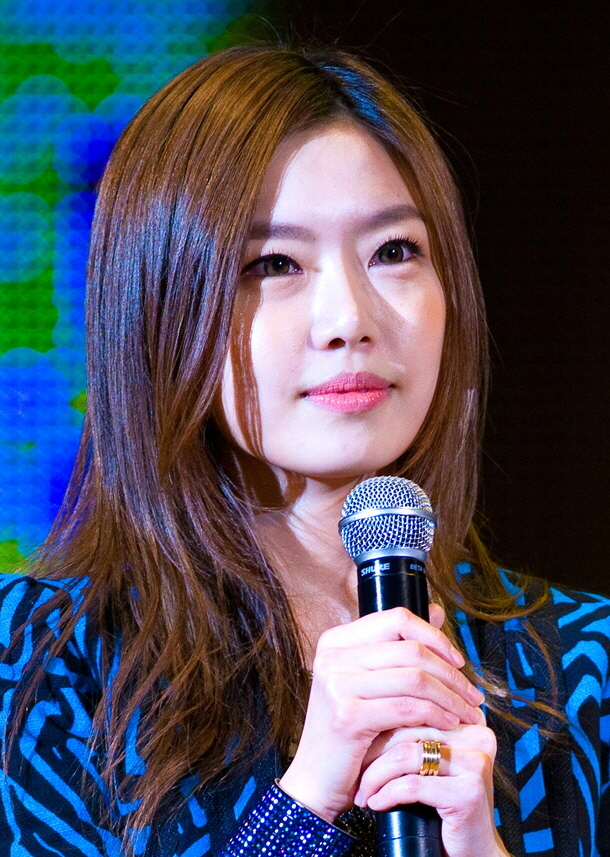
- Born: July 25, 1984 (age 41); Daegu, South Korea
- Occupations: Singer; television personality; radio presenter
- Years active: 2006–present
- Spouse: Lim Hyun-tae (m. 2023)
- Children: 2

Korean name
- Hangul: 전지혜
- Hanja: 全智慧
- RR: Jeon Jihye
- MR: Chŏn Chihye

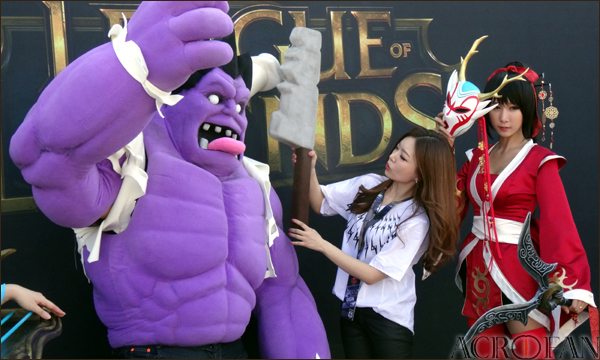
Lady Jane in October 2014

Jeon Ji-hye (Korean: 전지혜, born July 25, 1984), better known by her stage name Lady Jane, is a South Korean singer, television personality, radio presenter. Her syndicated radio show Lady Jane at 2PM, airs via the KBS Cool FM since 2015.

== Personal life ==
Lady Jane and the rapper Simon Dominic dated for 6 years from 2007 to 2013.

On April 14, 2023, it was confirmed Lady Jane and former BIGFLO member Lim Hyun-tae would be getting married after seven years of dating. The couple married on July 22, 2023. On January 10, 2025, Jeon announced she was pregnant with twins. Jeon gave birth to twin girls via caesarean section on July 3, 2025.

== Discography ==
=== Extended plays ===
Title	Album details	Peak chart positions	Sales
Title	Album details	KOR	Sales
Jane Another Jane (제인 어나더 제인)	Released: November 16, 2011; Label: Neowiz Internet; Format: CD, digital download	—	—

=== Singles ===
==== As lead artist ====
Title	Year	Peak chart positions		Album
Title	Year	KOR Gaon	KOR Billboard	Album
"Candy Tears" (눈물사탕) (with COIN)	2010	—	—	Non-album singles
"Don't Care" (이별 뭐 별거야)	2010	86	—	Non-album singles
"Intimate" (친한 사이)	2011	46	—	Non-album singles
"Love Treatment" (feat. Untouchable)	2011	—	—	Jane Another Jane
"Partner" (짝) (Feat. Tony An)	2011	74	—	Jane Another Jane
"6:30" (여섯시 반) (with Simon D)	2012	29	—	Non-album single
"More Lean On Me" (더 Lean On Me) (with Dr.Simpson)	2012	—	—	Clinic 12.5%
"Hello"	2013	—	—	Non-album single
"Stay" (feat. 1sagain)	2013	—	—	New Story Part.5
"Diary" (일기)	2013	67	—	Non-album single
"Dandy Girl"	2013	—	—	Non-album single
"Ballerina" (스무살) (with Nashow)	2014	—	—	20 Ballerina
"Are We 20 Years Old?" (스무살이니) (with Hanhae of Phantom)	2015	—	—	Non-album single
"Feel" (촉이와) (with MOSE)	2016	—	—	Non-album single
"I'm In Love" (with Jungkook)	2016	96	—	King of Mask Singer EP.71
"Farewell Warning" (이별주의) (feat. Dindin)	2016	—	—	Non-album single
"Just 2 days" (이틀이면)	2016	—	—	Non-album single
"—" denotes releases that did not chart or were not released in that region.

==== As featured artist ====
Title	Year	Peak chart positions		Album
Title	Year	KOR Gaon	KOR Billboard	Album
"After Breaking Up" (이별 뒤에 해야 할 몇 가지) (JP. feat. ladyJane)	2010	42	—	Non-album singles
"Available" (어베일러블) (Verbal Jint feat. ladyJane)	2011	44	—	Go Easy
"Ole ole" (오래오래) (Choi Hyo Jong feat. ladyJane)	2013	—	—	Non-album singles
"How R U?" (하우아유?) (Airplane, Narr. Lady Jane)	2014	—	—	Non-album singles
"Drunken Night" (취한밤) (SuperKidd feat. Lady Jane)	2015	—	—	Non-album singles
"To Be Expected" (그런 줄 알았어) (Kim Kyung Hoon feat. Lady Jane)	2018	—	—	Non-album singles
"Love To Be Part 2 (2018mix ver.)" (샴푸를 마시면 2018mix ver.) (Monochrome Cassette feat. Lady Jane)	2018	—	—	Non-album singles
"—" denotes releases that did not chart or were not released in that region.

==== Other appearances ====
Title	Year	Peak chart positions		Album
Title	Year	KOR Gaon	KOR Billboard	Album
"Ruby" (러뷰)	2007	—	—	Likeable or Not OST / Likeable or Not 2 OST
"Amnesia" (Loptimist feat. Simon Dominic, Lady Jane)	2008	—	—	Mind-Expander
"Sweeeet" (Aid feat. ladyJane)	2008	—	—	The Human Nature
"You and I" (너도 나와 같을까) (Lee Jin-wook feat. ladyJane)	2009	—	—	Brilliant Yesterday
"Love to Be Part 2" (샴푸를 마시면) (Feelbay feat. ladyJane)	2010	—	—	Love to Be Part 2
" If I could turn it back" (되돌릴 수 있다면) (Alex feat. ladyJane)	2011	—	—	Just Like Me / Late Autumn OST
"If I told you I loved you" (사랑한다고 내게 말해 줬으면) (LEN duet with Lady Jane)	2014	—	—	Second story (두 번째 이야기)
"Don't Believe The Story, Pt. 2" (믿겨지지 않는 이야기, Pt. 2) (JQ & ladyJane)	2014	56	—	Don't Believe The Story Vol.2
"We have it" (우리가 있잖아) (JOY Friends feat. Lady Jane, Kim Jang, Oh Se Yoon, Choi Jung Bin, Beat Jay, Kim Seo Young, Kim Duk Hyun, Min Jae Sung, Ami)	2014	—	—	We have it 2nd / (우리가 있잖아 2nd)
"We have it" (우리가 있잖아) (JOY Friends feat. Lady Jane, Oh Se Jun & Kim Duck Hyun)	2016	—	—	JOY Friends 5th Edition
"Kiss 101" (키스 잘하는 법) (Cho Jung Chi feat. Lady Jane)	2018	—	—	3
"Don't Believe The Story 2" (믿겨지지않는 이야기2) (JQ with Lady Jane)	2018	—	—	Journey'1.0'
"—" denotes releases that did not chart or were not released in that region.
