= Christina Confalonieri =

Italian-born South Korean broadcaster and radio host

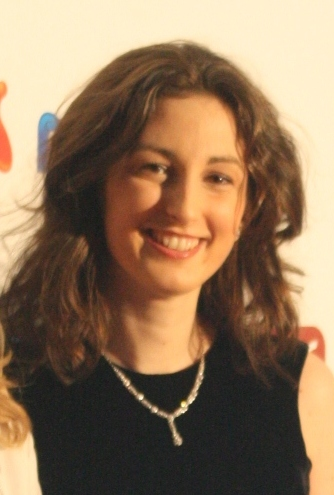
Confalonieri in 2009

Christina Confalonieri (Korean: 크리스티나 콘팔로니에리; born March 12, 1981) is an Italian-born South Korean broadcaster and radio host. She moved to Seoul from Milano and studied Korean at KHU Institute of International Education. She appeared on a Korean talk show, A Chat with Beauties, and has been a member of Global Talk Show since 2007. She is adjunct professor of Department of Law in Catholic University of Korea. She is the co-host of the radio show 입에서 톡-이탈리아어 broadcast by EBS FM. She has been the head of Yeoksam Global Village Center since 2008. She has been a special guest in the final episode of the ninth season of Pechino Express.

== Publications ==
- 크리스티나처럼 (2008) ISBN 9788993418033
