= Battle (South Korean band) =

South Korean boy band

- Origin: South Korea
- Genres: K-pop; hip hop
- Years active: 2006-2010; 2019
- Labels: Good
- Past members: Ryu; Jin Tae-hwa; Chris; Hwichan; Shin Ki-Hyun; Lio

Battle (Korean: 배틀) was a South Korean boy band that debuted on December 17, 2006, with the release of their first single "Crash". They are most popular for winning the reality show, Let's Coke Play! Battle Shinhwa!. The group includes Ryu, Tae-hwa, Lio, Chris, and Hwi-chan. Shin Ki-Hyun, who was chosen by Shinhwa's Eric, departed the group in 2008. The group separated following the dissolution of Good Entertainment, but reunited for a performance in 2019.

== Formation ==
The members of Battle participated in a popular reality show, Let's Coke Play! Battle Shinhwa!, hosted by the members of Shinhwa themselves. The show was sponsored by Good Entertainment, M-NET and Coca-Cola. The members were hand-picked particularly by each of the Shinhwa members. They were chosen because of their singing, dancing, and endurance skills. Although Kim Jang Hyun was picked during the course of the show, he decided to leave the group due to conflicting musical styles. Dongwan, who picked Jang Hyun, replaced him with Hwichan.

== Career ==
=== 2006—2007: Debut and first tour ===
Their first single was Crash, a song with a strong guitar and drum accompaniment. The music video was very dark, showing the members destroying various objects such as T.V.s, cars, etc. as opposed to Crash, which was a melodious dance tune combined with hardcore guitar and staccato drum beats, their other song, Icarus, was a ballad, showing their smooth vocals and harmonizing skills. Many of the fans also mention that "Icarus" sounds a lot like Shinhwa's number one hit song, "Once in a Lifetime". Flying Up, the third track from the single, was a rap song with great beat. Their debut performance was on SBS Gayo where they received very little applause and cheers though it being their first performance they achieved very well. From then on when they first did their live performance critics all stated that Battle is weak in vocal skills, despite the rolling rumors and comments Battle went on MBC Music Core and did a live performance for the very first time and performed very strongly.

After gaining some popularity in Thailand, the group started their first concert tour there on April 30, 2007. Subsequently, their second single "Tell Me! (Mal Hae)" was ranked 7th on the monthly "Top 20 Album Sales" with 10,263 copies sold in May.

After their tour from Thailand, Battle flew to Beijing, China on July 31, 2007. There, they appeared on numerous shows, including the popular CCTV-4 music program Joonghwajeong.

=== 2008: Kihyun's departure, Step by Step, and solo careers ===
Kihyun announced on June 2, 2008, that he would leave Battle shortly before their next comeback. On May 30, Battle's homepage officially went live, and their new looks were unveiled. The next album was teased, with photos released daily. Their music video was released two hours later than scheduled. They made their comeback stage on Music Bank's Summer special, on June 13. A comeback was speculated in 2009, but members Hwi-chan and Lio entered the military on June 2 and July 7, respectively, putting the group on hiatus. The other three members focused on their solo activities: Ryu started an acting career while Chris studied music in New York; lastly, Taehwa announced a solo career shortly after.

Despite all these, Good Entertainment stood firm that the group would not disband.

=== 2009—2010: Military service, Good Entertainment's bankruptcy and indefinite hiatus ===
On October 6, 2009, member Jin Taehwa released his first solo single under the name Zin Taehwa.

Although no official statement was released, Ryu entered the military. Following Good Entertainment's bankruptcy, the group became inactive.

=== 2019: I Can See Your Voice ===
On January 25, 2019, member Hwi-chan had lost I Can See Your Voice on the first round. Due to this, all members (minus Lio) performed "Step by Step", showing what they had achieved in the past 10 years.

== Members ==
- Ryu
- Taehwa
- Hwichan
- Chris
- Kihyun
- Lio

== Awards ==
Years	Awards
2007	MKMF 2007 Awards: Male Group Newface (nominated)

== Discography ==
=== Singles ===
Title of release	Date of release	Tracklist
Crash (Crazy Love)	December 14, 2006	1. Crash [Crazy in Love]; 2. Icarus; 3. Flying Up; 4. Icarus Instrumental
Tell Me (Malhae)	May 30, 2007	1. 말해! (Malhae! - Tell Me!); 2. Hey Yo; 3. 고장난 가슴 (Gojangnan Gaseum - Broken Heart); 4. 고장난 가슴 (Gojangnan Gaseum - Broken Heart) Instrumental
Step by Step	June 10, 2008	1. Big Change (feat. Deegie); 2. Step by Step; 3. Luv U
