= Ida Daussy =

South Korean celebrity (born 1969)

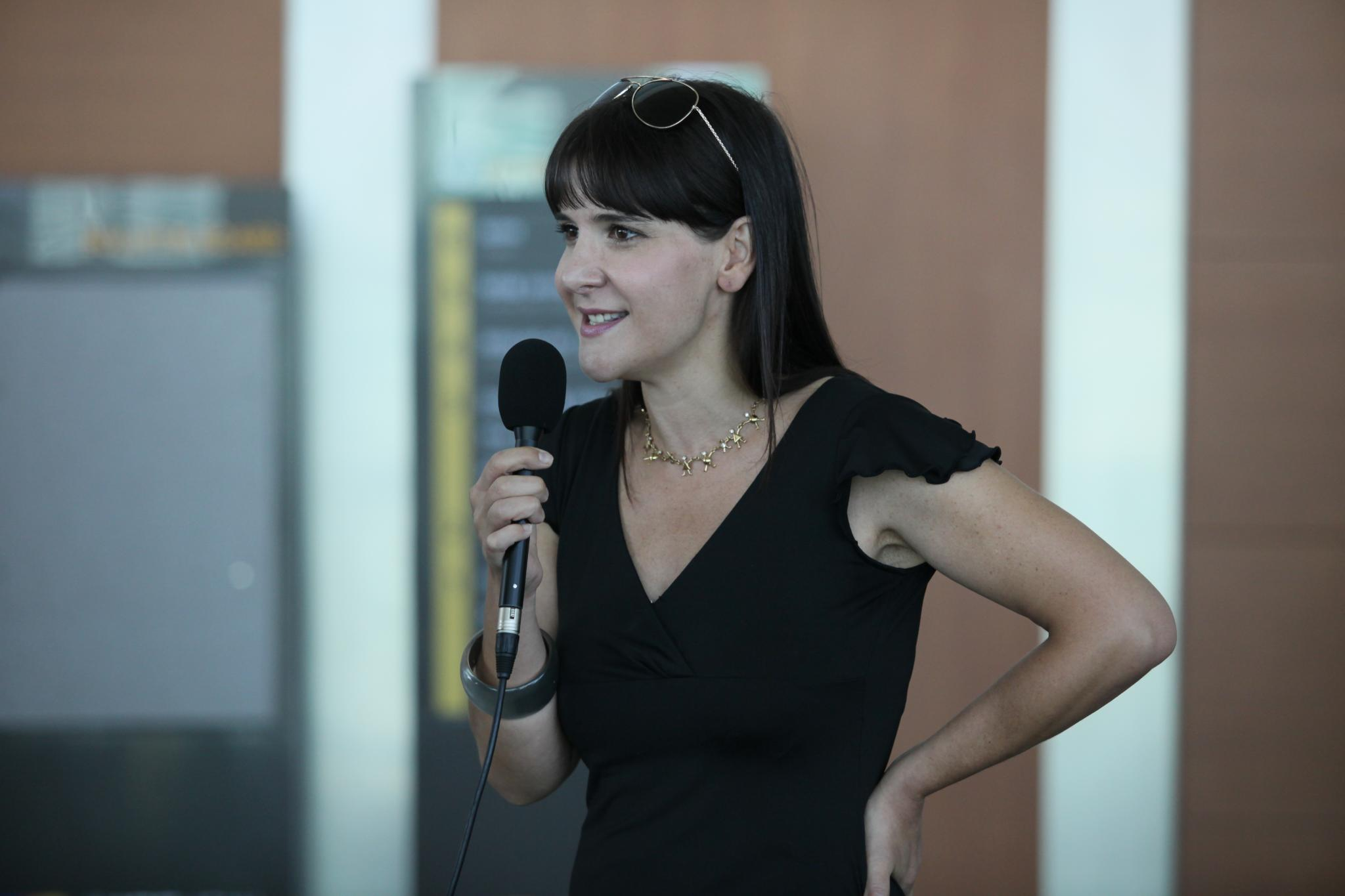
- Ida Daussy in 2009
- Born: 13 July 1969 (age 56); Fécamp, Seine-Maritime, Normandie, France
- Citizenship: South Korea (1996–present)
- Occupation(s): Professor of French language and culture
- Employer: Sookmyung Women's University

Korean name
- Hangul: 서혜나
- RR: Seo Hyena
- MR: Sŏ Hyena

Ida Daussy (born 13 July 1969), also known by her Korean name Seo Hye-na, is a South Korean celebrity. Born in France, she came to South Korea in the 1990s and is currently a professor at the Department of French Language & Culture of Sookmyung Women's University. She received a presidential citation in 2005 by the South Korean government. Her television work turned her into a "household name" in South Korea.

== Personal life ==
Daussy, a native of Fécamp, studied international business at the University of Le Havre. She came to South Korea on an exchange programme during her postgraduate studies in 1991, and married a man from Gyeongsang in 1993. She naturalised as a South Korean citizen after the marriage. The couple had two children, and divorced in 2009. She has registered the hangul transcription of her original French surname as her legal Korean surname.

== Publications ==
- 봉주르 여봉 싸랑해요 (1996), ISBN 8975300129
- 이다도시의 행복공감 (2006), ISBN 9788952746351
- 이다도시의 생활체험 프랑스식 감성교육법 (2000), ISBN 8989015081
- 이다도시 한국, 수다로 풀다 (2007), ISBN 9788991684362
- 봉주르 와인 (2009), ISBN 9788959133659
