= Nancy Lang =

American performance artist, entrepreneur and television personality

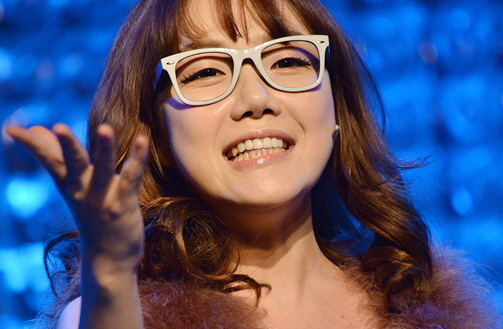
- Born: 11 March 1976 (age 50); New York City, New York or Seoul
- Occupation: Pop Artist
- Years active: 2000–present

Nancy Lang (Korean: 낸시 랭, Korean name: Park Hye-ryeong; Korean: 박혜령; born March 11, 1976) is a Pop artist, performance artist, entrepreneur and television personality. In 2010, she performed as "beggar the queen" in London. Her performances are considered on the fringe of artwork. From October 2012 to 2013, Lang starred Hwang Jung-min and Kim Se-a in The Vagina Monologues. She is CEO of cosmetic shop Laha Korea and Hair brand Lang Shop.

== Biography ==
Nancy went back to Korea in 1996 and went to Hongik University to study western art and gave up her south korean nationality around that time. In 2003, Nancy lang debuted with her 2003 performance at the Venice biennale titled 'the conflict with uninvited dreams', which was playing a violin in a lingerie.

== Publications ==
Year	Title	International Standard Book Number
2006	비키니 입은 현대미술	ISBN 9788959866564
2008	엉뚱발랄 미술관	ISBN 9788971899021
2010	난 실행할거야	ISBN 9788994122175
2012	아름다운 청춘	ISBN 9788997190317
