= Park Hyun-bin =

South Korean singer (born 1982)

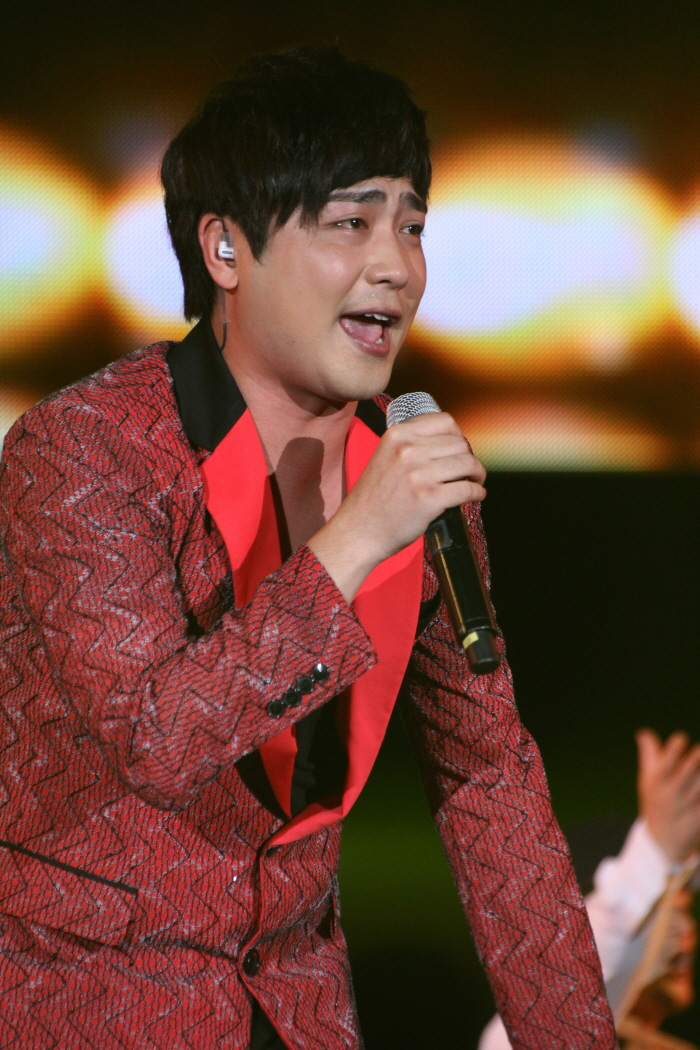

Background information
- Born: Park Ji-ung; October 28, 1982 (age 44); Gwangmyeong, South Korea
- Genre: Trot
- Occupation: Singer
- Years active: 2006–present

Korean name
- Hangul: 박지웅
- Hanja: 朴智雄
- RR: Bak Jiung
- MR: Pak Chiung

Stage name
- Hangul: 박현빈
- Hanja: 朴炫彬
- RR: Bak Hyeonbin
- MR: Pak Hyŏnbin

Park Ji-ung (Korean: 박지웅; born October 28, 1982), better known by his stage name Park Hyun-bin (박현빈), is a South Korean trot singer. Dubbed the "Prince of Trot", he made his debut in 2006 and has released three studio albums. His songs have become popular chants and rally songs sung at sporting events or election campaigns due to their catchy lyrics and tunes.

== Early life ==
Park was born and raised in Gwangmyeong and moved to the Incheon area when he was in middle school. He was exposed to music from an early age as his father was an amateur saxophone player and his mother is a former vocal instructor. After completing his mandatory military service in the Republic of Korea Air Force, where he was part of the band, he decided to pursue a career in music and majored in voice at the Chugye University for the Arts. During his second year in college, he auditioned at Jang Yoon-jeong's agency and was selected.

== Career ==
Park debuted in 2006 with the album Gondre Mandre. At that time he was given the sobriquet "Male Jang Yoon-jeong" by netizens and fans as both were under the same management and embodied a new generation of trot singers who possessed good looks and charismatic stage presence. He was recognized by the Korean Traditional Music Promotion Association with the Rookie of the Year award in 2007.

In 2008 Park released his second album, Shabang Shabang in 2008. He won the award in the Trot category at the Seoul Music Awards that year, beating veterans such as Tae Jin-ah and Song Dae-kwan. In 2011 he released a Japanese version and it became a hit in Japan, topping the USEN Enka charts. He was one of the performers at the 2011 Music Bank World Tour and became the first trot singer to perform at the Tokyo Dome and the only trot singer in the line-up, which mostly consisted of pop singers and idol groups. That year he returned to the domestic music scene and released his third album Hourglass.

== Personal life ==
In 2015 Park married traditional dancer Kim Joo-hee. They have a son and a daughter, both of whom have appeared with him on The Return of Superman.

in 2016 Park was involved in a traffic accident near Julpo IC on the upbound line of the West Coast Expressway. In this accident, he suffered a fracture to his right leg and thigh, and the manager who was driving suffered a crushing injury to his face. Because this accident left him traumatized , he now avoids using cars at all and takes the KTX to most local events.

Park is the younger of two sons. His older brother Ji-su is an opera singer (baritone) based in Germany and graduated from Kyung Hee University and the University of Music and Theatre Leipzig. The brothers performed together during the episode of Immortal Songs: Singing the Legend broadcast on May 24, 2019 and were the final winners.

== Discography ==
- Gondre Mandre (곤드레 만드레) (2006)
- Shabang Shabang (샤방샤방) (2008)
- Hourglass (모래시계) (2011)

== Filmography ==
=== Television shows ===
Year	Title	Role	Notes	Ref.
2021	National Top 10 Music Show	Host	broadcast on local television stations	
2022	Burning Trotman	Judge		

== Awards ==
Year	Award	Category	Result	Ref.
2008	Seoul Music Awards	Trot Award	Won	
2009	Seoul Music Awards	Trot Award	Won	
2010	Seoul Music Awards	Trot Award	Won	
2012	Japan Gold Disc Award	Best New Enka Artist	Won	
2015	Korean Popular Culture and Arts Awards	Minister of Culture, Sports and Tourism Commendation	Won	
