= Wink (South Korean group) =

South Korean music duo

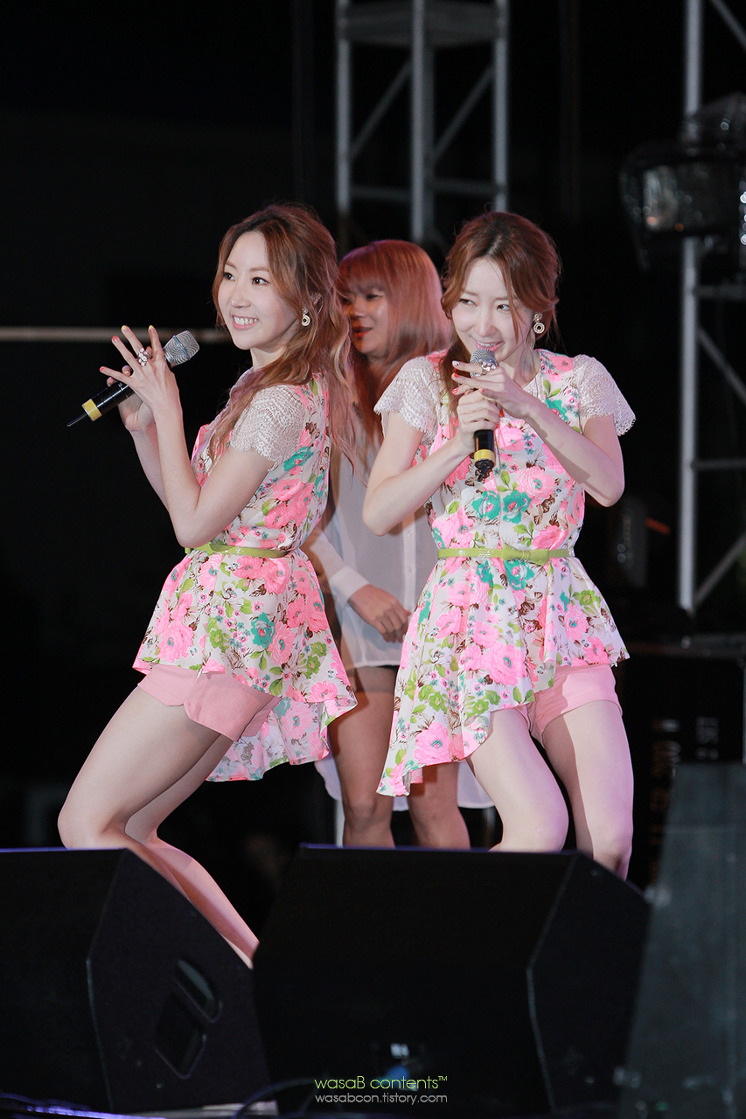
- Wink in January 2014

Background information
- Origin: Seoul, South Korea
- Genre: Trot
- Years active: 2008–present
- Members: Kang Joo-hee; Kang Seung-hee

Wink (Korean: 윙크) is a South Korean trot music duo. They debuted on February 12, 2008, with the single "Match Made in Heaven".

== Discography ==
=== Singles ===
Year	Single	Peak position	Album
2008	"천생연분" (Soulfulness)	—	Non-album single
2010	"얼쑤" (Fantastic)	—	Non-album single
2011	"아따 고것참" (It's True)	—	Non-album single
2014	"봉 잡았네!"	—	Non-album single

== Awards and nominations ==
Year	Award	Category	Nominated work	Result	Ref.
2008	Korean Entertainment Arts Awards	Newcomer		Won	
2011	Korean Popular Culture and Arts Awards	Trot Award		Won	
2015	Korean Popular Culture and Arts Awards	Trot Award		Won	
