= Kim Hyun-chul (comedian) =

South Korean comedian (born 1970)

- Born: August 27, 1970 (age 56); Seoul, South Korea

Comedy career
- Years active: 1994–present
- Medium: Stand-up, television
- Genres: Observational, Sketch, Wit, Parody, Slapstick, Dramatic, Sitcom

Korean name
- Hangul: 김현철
- RR: Gim Hyeoncheol
- MR: Kim Hyŏnch'ŏl

Kim Hyun-chul (Korean: 김현철; born August 27, 1970), is a South Korean comedian.
