= Ahn Ji-hwan =

South Korean actor (born 1969)

Ahn Ji-hwan 안지환
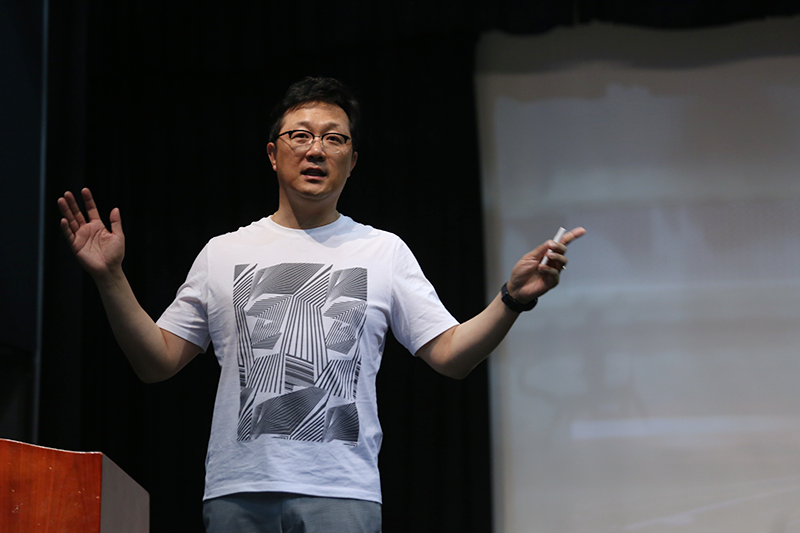
- Ahn in 2018
- Born: 안지환; July 24, 1969 (age 57); Seoul, South Korea
- Occupations: Voice actor; actor; television presenter; radio presenter
- Years active: 1993–present
- Height: 180 cm (5 ft 11 in)
- Children: Yein of Melody Day

Korean name
- Hangul: 안지환
- RR: An Jihwan
- MR: An Chihwan
- Website: Official fan club (in Korean); Official Twitter

Ahn Ji-hwan (Korean: 안지환; born July 24, 1969) is a South Korean voice actor, actor and television and radio presenter who joined Munhwa Broadcasting Corporation's Voice Acting Division in 1993 and debuted with his role as Prince Dandarn (known as Prince Omar in South Korea) on the Korean dub of Time Travel Tondekeman.

Since the early 2000s, Ahn has narrated several entertaining shows at Seoul Broadcasting System, including Animal Farm, The Music Trend, and Star King. In June 2012, he made his stage debut, performing the part of Edna Turnblad in a South Korean musical Hairspray based on a 1988 film under the same title.

Ahn has become famous for his cover of Johnny Depp on the Korean dub of Pirates of the Caribbean: The Curse of the Black Pearl, for his role as Det. Danny Messer on the Korean dub of CSI: NY, and for his narration of The Knee-Drop Guru on the South Korean talk show Golden Fishery.

On December 16, 2025, Ahn announced through his agency that, due to health reasons, he would be halting all activities, including narrating Animal Farm for 24 years, to focus on recovery. His junior voice actor, Nam Do-hyeong, is filling in as the show's narrator.

== Career ==
=== Voice acting ===
==== TV animation dubbing ====
- Bomberman B-Daman Bakugaiden V (빅토리 구슬동자, SBS)
  - Black Bomber (later)
- Fantomcat (무적 고양이 팬텀, MBC)
  - Fantomcat
- Flower Witch Mary Bell (꽃의 천사 메리벨, MBC)
  - Takuro
- Future GPX Cyber Formula (신세기 사이버 포뮬러, SBS)
  - Bleed Kaga
- Galaxy Express 999 (은하철도 999, MBC)
  - Count Mecha
- Hamtaro (방가방가 햄토리, SBS)
  - Dexter (An-gyeong on the Korean TV edition)
- Iron Man #28 FX (철인 28호 FX, MBC)
  - Franken
- Miracle Girls (요술소녀, MBC)
  - Chris Kubrick (Woo Jeong-soo on the Korean TV edition)
- Olympus Guardian (그리스 로마 신화: 올림포스 가디언, SBS)
  - Hercules
- The Prince of Tennis (테니스의 왕자, SBS)
  - Kunimitsu Tezuka (Dok-go Si-hyeong on the Korean TV edition)
- Red Baron (레드 바론, MBC)
  - Kômei Ryû (Je-gal Ryang on the Korean TV edition)
  - Narrator
- Rolling Stars (롤링 스타즈, KBS)
  - Narrator
- Slam Dunk (슬램덩크, SBS)
  - Akira Sendoh (Yoon Dae-hyeop on the Korean TV edition)
  - Kiminobu Kogure (Kwon Jun-ho on the Korean TV edition)
  - Narrator
- Time Travel Tondekeman (시간 탐험대, MBC)
  - Prince Dandarn (Prince Omar on the Korean TV edition)

==== Animated movie dubbing ====
===== 1990s =====
Year	Title	Role	Notes
1998	The Prince of Egypt (이집트 왕자)	Moses	The Korean TV edition broadcast on SBS

===== 2010s =====
Year	Title	Role	Notes
2011	Pokémon the Movie: Black—Victini and Reshiram (포켓몬스터 베스트위시 극장판: 비크티니와 백의 영웅 레시라무)	Zekrom	
2011	Pokémon the Movie: White—Victini and Zekrom (포켓몬스터 베스트위시 극장판: 비크티니와 흑의 영웅 제크로무)	Zekrom	

==== Film dubbing ====
===== A =====
- All the Pretty Horses (올 더 프리티 호스, MBC)
  - Matt Damon as John Grady Cole
- Armageddon (아마겟돈, SBS)
  - Ben Affleck as A. J. Frost

===== B =====
- Bad Boys II (나쁜 녀석들 2, MBC)
  - Martin Lawrence as Detective Marcus Burnett
- Big Daddy (빅 대디, MBC)
  - Adam Sandler as Sonny Koufax

===== C =====
- A Chinese Ghost Story (천녀유혼, MBC)
  - Leslie Cheung as Ning Choi-san
- A Chinese Ghost Story II (천녀유혼 2, MBC)
  - Leslie Cheung as Ning Choi-san
- Click (클릭, MBC)
  - Adam Sandler as Michael Newman
- Cold Mountain (콜드 마운틴, MBC)
  - Jude Law as W.P. Inman
- Con Air (콘 에어, MBC)
  - John Cusack as US Marshal Vince Larkin
- Contact (컨택트, SBS)
  - Matthew McConaughey as Palmer Joss

===== D =====
- Double Team (더블 팀, MBC)
  - Jean-Claude Van Damme as Jack Paul Quinn

===== E =====
- Enemy at the Gates (에너미 앳 더 게이트, MBC)
  - Jude Law as Vasily Zaitsev

===== H =====
- Heat (히트, MBC)
  - Val Kilmer as Chris Shiherlis
- Hero (영웅, MBC)
  - Jet Li as Nameless
- House of Flying Daggers (연인, MBC)
  - Andy Lau as Liu

===== I =====
- Inner Senses (이도공간, SBS)
  - Leslie Cheung as Jim Law
- The Italian Job (이탈리안 잡, MBC)
  - Edward Norton as Steve

===== L =====
- The Lord of the Rings: The Fellowship of the Ring (반지의 제왕: 반지 원정대, SBS)
  - Viggo Mortensen as Aragorn

===== M =====
- Meltdown (이연걸의 탈출, MBC)
  - Jet Li as Kit Li
- Mission: Impossible 2 (미션 임파서블 2, MBC)
  - Tom Cruise as Ethan Hunt

===== N =====
- Nick of Time (닉 오브 타임, MBC)
  - Johnny Depp as Gene Watson

===== P =====
- Pirates of the Caribbean: The Curse of the Black Pearl (캐리비안의 해적: 블랙 펄의 저주, MBC)
  - Johnny Depp as Jack Sparrow

===== R =====
- Red Cliff (적벽대전, MBC)
  - Tony Leung as Zhou Yu
- Rogue Trader (겜블, MBC)
  - Ewan McGregor as Nick Leeson
- The Rundown (웰컴 투 더 정글, MBC)
  - Dwayne Johnson as Beck

===== S =====
- Samurai Fiction (사무라이 픽션, MBC)
  - Tomoyasu Hotei as Rannosuke Kazamatsuri
- Sky Captain and the World of Tomorrow (월드 오브 투모로우, MBC)
  - Jude Law as Sky Captain
- Snatch (스내치, MBC)
  - Brad Pitt as Mickey O'Neil
- Star Wars (스타 워즈, MBC)
  - Ewan McGregor as Obi-Wan Kenobi
  - Mark Hamill as Luke Skywalker

===== T =====
- The Thomas Crown Affair (토마스 크라운 어페어, MBC)
  - Pierce Brosnan as Thomas Crown
- Top Gun (탑 건, SBS)
  - Tom Cruise as LT Pete "Maverick" Mitchell

===== V =====
- Vanilla Sky (바닐라 스카이, MBC)
  - Tom Cruise as David Aames

===== Y =====
- You Don't Mess with the Zohan (조한, MBC)
  - Adam Sandler as Zohan Dvir/Scrappy Coco

==== Foreign TV show dubbing ====
- 24 (24, MBC)
  - Kiefer Sutherland as Jack Bauer
- Band of Brothers (밴드 오브 브라더스, MBC)
  - Matthew Settle as Ronald Speirs
- Buffy the Vampire Slayer (버피와 뱀파이어, MBC)
  - Nicholas Brendon as Xander Harris
- The Client (존 그리셤의 의뢰인, MBC)
  - David Barry Gray as Clint McGuire
- CSI: NY (CSI NY, MBC)
  - Carmine Giovinazzo as Det. Danny Messer
- The Fugitive (도망자, MBC)
  - Tim Daly as Richard Kimble
- Heroes (히어로즈, SBS)
  - Adrian Pasdar as Nathan Petrelli
- Ripley's Believe It or Not! (리플리의 믿거나 말거나, MBC)
  - Dean Cain as Himself
- Smallville (스몰빌, MBC)
  - Michael Rosenbaum as Lex Luthor

==== Narrations ====
- 5th Republic (제5공화국, MBC)
- Animal Farm (TV 동물농장, SBS)
- Crisis Escape No. 1 (위기탈출 넘버원, KBS)
- Global Report (지구촌 리포트, MBC)
- Golden Fishery (황금어장, MBC)
  - Narrator of the segment "The Knee-Drop Guru (무릎팍 도사)"
    - January 3, 2007 - October 12, 2011 (aired Wednesdays, first run until the segment ended due to the temporary retirement of Kang Ho-dong)
    - November 29, 2012 - August 22, 2013 (aired Thursdays, second run after the segment was revamped as an independent show)
- Live Show: Friday Wide (생방송 금요와이드, MBC)
  - Narrator of the segment "Appetizing Trips with Sayuri Fujita (사유리의 식탐여행)"
- Martian Virus (화성인 바이러스, tvN)
- MBC News Desk (MBC 뉴스데스크, MBC)
  - News presenter
- Inkigayo (SBS 인기가요, previously SBS Popular Song, SBS)
  - Stage presenter
- Our Sunday Night (일요일 일요일 밤에, previously Sunday Sunday Night, MBC)
  - Narrator of the segment "Love House"
- Section TV Entertainment Telecommunications (섹션 TV 연예통신, MBC)
  - News presenter
- Star King (놀라운 대회! 스타킹, SBS)

=== TV appearances ===
==== 1990s ====
Year(s)	Title	Network	Role	Notes
1997	Into the Stories (다큐멘터리: 이야기 속으로)	MBC	Host	

==== 2000s ====
Year(s)	Title	Network	Role	Notes
2001	Talk Show: With Im Seong-hoon (토크쇼: 임성훈과 함께)	MBC	Guest	
2003	Comedy House (코미디 하우스)	MBC	Host	Ji-hwan hosted the segment "3-Men Forum (3자 토론)".
2003-04	The World Is Wide (세상은 넓다)	KBS	Host	He hosted the show weekdays.
2005	Parents (생방송 60분 부모)	EBS	Host	
2008	UCIS: Unsolved Crime Investigation Service (미해결 범죄 수사대)	MBC Drama	Kim Yong-dae	In the drama, Yong-dae is the head investigator of the team.
2009	1 vs. 100 (1 대 100)	KBS	Himself	The challenger (Episode 115)

==== 2010s ====
Year(s)	Title	Network	Role	Notes
2010	Yoo Jae-suk and Kim Won-hee's Come to Play (유재석 김원희의 놀러와)	MBC	Guest	Episode 318: The God-Given Voices
2010	Everyone's Best! (누가 누가 잘 하나)	EBS	Guest	Guest appearance with Ahn Ye-in, his daughter (Episode 278)
2011	Top Band (탑밴드)	KBS	Himself	The bassist of the On-Air Band (Episode 1)
2011	Morning Forum (아침마당)	KBS	Himself	One of the panel guests
2011	Challenge! 1000 Songs (도전! 1000곡)	SBS	Guest	Episode 163
2011	Golden Fishery (황금어장)	MBC	Himself	The opening presenter of the segment "Radio Star (라디오 스타)" (Episode 256)
2012	Challenge! 1000 Songs (도전! 1000곡)	SBS	Guest	Episode 201
2012	Golden Eggs (황금알)	MBN	Guest	Episode 17
2012	TV Show Jin-poom-myeong-poom (TV쇼 진품명품)	KBS	Guest	Episode 867
2012	Animal Farm (TV 동물농장)	SBS	Himself	The presenter of 2012 Animal Farm Awards (Episode 596)
2012-13	Morning Wide (출발! 모닝와이드)	SBS	Host	He has hosted the segment "The World Through the Black Boxes (블랙박스로 본 세상!)" Mondays and Wednesdays.
2013	Animal Farm (TV 동물농장)	SBS	Himself	Episode 600
2013	Family's Dignity: Full House (가족의 품격 풀하우스)	KBS	Guest	Episode 25
2016	King of Mask Singer (미스터리 음악쇼 복면가왕)	MBC	Contestant	Episode 79

=== Radio appearances ===
==== 2000s ====
Year(s)	Title	Network	Role	Notes
2003-04	Yoon Jong-shin's Have a Date in 2 P.M. (윤종신의 두시의 데이트)	MBC	Guest	Guest for the Friday-aired segment "Live Show: I Like Quiz (생방송 퀴즈가 좋다)"
2004-07	Yoon Jong-shin's Have a Date in 2 P.M. (윤종신의 두시의 데이트)	MBC	Guest	Guest for the weekday-aired segment Guest for the segment "Sense and the City"
2007	Park Myung-soo's FUN FUN Radio (박명수의 펀펀 라디오)	MBC	Guest	Guest for the segment "The Superstar Generation (거성시대)"
2007-08	Yoon Jong-shin's Have a Date in 2 P.M. (윤종신의 두시의 데이트)	MBC	Guest	Guest for the weekday-aired segment "Quiz and the City"
2008	Park Myung-soo's Have a Date in 2 P.M. (박명수의 두시의 데이트)	MBC	Guest	Guest for the weekday-aired segment "Quiz & Break"
2008-09	Park Myung-soo's Have a Date in 2 P.M. (박명수의 두시의 데이트)	MBC	Guest	Guest for the weekday-aired segment "Coming Soon Quiz"
2009-11	The 9595 Show (9595 쇼)	TBS	Host	Ji-hwan hosted the show weekdays, with Lee Seong-mi (South Korean comedian).

==== 2010s ====
Year(s)	Title	Network	Role	Notes
2010	Kim Heechul's Young Street (김희철의 영스트리트)	SBS	Guest	Guest for the segment "DJ Performance Assessment (DJ 수행평가)"
2010	The Cultwo Show (두시탈출 컬투쇼)	SBS	Guest	
2011	Younha's Starry Night (윤하의 별이 빛나는 밤에)	MBC	Guest	Guest for the segment "My Dear Uncle (아저씨)"
2011	Younha's Starry Night (윤하의 별이 빛나는 밤에)	MBC	Guest	Guest for the segment "Love Story in Chuseok (별밤 진상극장: 러브 스토리 in 추석)"
2012	Kim Chang-ryeol's Old School (김창렬의 올드스쿨)	SBS	Guest	Guest for the segment "Take a Break (쉬는 시간)"
2012	The Big Show with Voice Actors (성우 빅쇼)	SBS	Host	
2013	He Reads Korean Textbooks (성우 안지환이 읽어 주는 국어 교과서)	EBS	Host	He has hosted the show weekdays.

=== Stage appearance ===
Year	Title	Role	Theater
2012	Hairspray (헤어스프레이)	Edna Turnblad	Grand Theater, Chungmu Arts Hall, Seoul

== Awards ==
=== Korean Broadcasting Awards ===
Year	Award	Result
2005	Best Voice Actor/Actress	Won

=== Korean Broadcasting Producer Awards ===
Year	Award	Result
2001	Best Voice Actor/Actress	Won
2007	Voice Actor/Actress of the Year	Won

=== MBC Drama Awards ===
Year	Award	Result
2001	Special Award for Foreign Film Dubbing	Won
2006	Special Award for a Voice Actor/Actress on the Radio	Won

=== SBS Awards ===
Year	Award	Result
2005	Achievement Award	Won
2011	Special Award for a Voice Actor/Actress on the Best Program of the First Half Year	Won

== See also ==
- Munhwa Broadcasting Corporation
- MBC Voice Acting Division
