= Barefooted Friends =

- Also known as: Good Sunday - Barefooted Friends
- Genre: Reality, Variety
- Starring: Kang Ho-dong; Yoon Jong-shin; Eun Ji-won; Yoon Si-yoon; Uee; Kim Hyun-joong; Eunhyuk
- Country of origin: South Korea
- Original language: Korean
- No. of episodes: 31

Production
- Producer: Jang Hyuk-jae
- Running time: 70-80 minutes per episode

Original release
- Network: SBS
- Release: April 21 – November 17, 2013

Related
- Good Sunday

Barefooted Friends (Korean: 맨발의 친구들) was a South Korean reality-variety show; a part of SBS's Good Sunday lineup, along with Running Man. It was first aired on April 21, 2013. The show is a "real outdoor hardship variety"; a spin on typical outdoor variety shows. The members experience "real happiness" with others through challenges. The words, Barefooted is supposed to mean essence, sincerity, and real hardships, where as Friends not only represents the cast, but the people that are met as well. It has garnered attention as being the come-back program for Kang Ho-dong, the main MC of the program, after leaving Good Sunday's X-man in April 2007. After a seven-month run, the program was cancelled due to low ratings and to make room for K-pop Star 3, with the final episode airing on November 17, 2013.

In 2020, due to the requests of Kim Hyun-Joong's Japanese fans, after the completion of his previous Japanese variety show "Raw Hyun-Joong", the Japanese Cable Television "Satellite Theatre (Eisei Gekijo)" began to air Barefooted Friends from June 28 till July 28.

== Format ==
=== Episode 1-6 ===
A new life experience meeting new people in a new place, and exploring the cultural heritage and natural environment unseen elsewhere, the members search for real beauty and happiness on foreign soil. The members travel to foreign countries to experience "real happiness" with locals. Unlike typical vacations, they live like locals and experience what a day in their life is like. Members must provide for themselves as no support from staff is given. The members experience the essence of culture, food, music, nature, and lifestyle while surviving on their own in the foreign country. This program is a differentiated real variety program providing affection and enlightenment to viewers.

=== Episode 7-31 ===
The members take part in challenges based on different themes (diving, song writing, cooking, etc.).

== Cast ==
The original members of Barefooted Friends are Kang Ho-dong, Yoon Jong-shin, Yoo Se-yoon, Kim Bum-soo, Kim Hyun-joong, Yoon Si-yoon, Eunhyuk, Uee Unlike the other members, this is the first time Kim Bum-soo, Kim Hyun-joong, Yoon Si-yoon, and Uee are participating in a variety show as regulars, and the synergy effect between the experienced variety seniors and rookies are anticipated. As of June 9, 2013, Yoo Se-yoon has left the program due to his DUI case, and will not appear from episode 10. Eun Ji-won has replaced him. On June 11, 2013, Kim Bum-soo suffered an injury to his knee during the recording of the Diving Special and was transported to a hospital. He has since left the program. Eunhyuk has not appeared on the program since the diving special, and is presumed to have left the program. On October 31, 2013, it was announced that Kim Hyun-joong has completed his final filming of the program and will be leaving due to schedule conflicts, airing November 3.

== List of episodes ==
=== 2013 ===
#	Episode #	Broadcast Date	Location	Guests	Mission
1	1	April 21, 2013	Mui Ne & Huế, Vietnam	No guests	Live like a Vietnamese for 24 hours Find the greatest smile Have fun with Vietnamese people
1	2	April 28, 2013	Mui Ne & Huế, Vietnam	No guests	Live like a Vietnamese for 24 hours Find the greatest smile Have fun with Vietnamese people
1	3	May 5, 2013	Mui Ne & Huế, Vietnam	No guests	Live like a Vietnamese for 24 hours Find the greatest smile Have fun with Vietnamese people
2	4 (Note: Eunhyuk was unable to attend due to schedule conflicts.)	May 12, 2013	Yogyakarta, Indonesia	No guests	Live like an Indonesian for 24 hours Have fun with Indonesian children Catch the last flight to Korea
2	5	May 19, 2013	Yogyakarta, Indonesia	No guests	Live like an Indonesian for 24 hours Have fun with Indonesian children Catch the last flight to Korea
2	6	May 26, 2013	Yogyakarta, Indonesia	No guests	Live like an Indonesian for 24 hours Have fun with Indonesian children Catch the last flight to Korea
3	6	May 26, 2013	Seoul	Lee Hyo-ri	Visit your home and earn money for the MT; Get to know each other through the MT
3	7	June 2, 2013	Seoul	Lee Hyo-ri	Visit your home and earn money for the MT; Get to know each other through the MT
3	8	June 9, 2013	Seoul	Lee Hyo-ri	Visit your home and earn money for the MT; Get to know each other through the MT
3	8	June 9, 2013	Jirisan	Lee Hyo-ri	Visit your home and earn money for the MT; Get to know each other through the MT
3	9	June 16, 2013	Jirisan	Lee Hyo-ri	Visit your home and earn money for the MT; Get to know each other through the MT
4	10 (Note: Kim Bum-soo temporarily leaves the program due to an injury.)	June 23, 2013	Gimcheon Indoor Swimming Pool; Suwon World Cup Stadium Swimming Pool	No guests	Overcome the fear of diving
4	11	June 30, 2013	Gimcheon Indoor Swimming Pool; Suwon World Cup Stadium Swimming Pool	Kim Byung-man	Overcome the fear of diving
4	12	July 7, 2013	Gimcheon Indoor Swimming Pool; Suwon World Cup Stadium Swimming Pool	INFINITE, Lee Joon (MBLAQ), Jo Kwon (2AM), 2PM, Sistar, Rainbow	Overcome the fear of diving
4	13	July 14, 2013	Gimcheon Indoor Swimming Pool; Suwon World Cup Stadium Swimming Pool	INFINITE, Lee Joon (MBLAQ), Jo Kwon (2AM), 2PM, Sistar, Rainbow	Overcome the fear of diving
4	14	July 21, 2013	Gimcheon Indoor Swimming Pool; Suwon World Cup Stadium Swimming Pool	INFINITE, Lee Joon (MBLAQ), Jo Kwon (2AM), 2PM, Sistar, Rainbow	Overcome the fear of diving
4	15	July 28, 2013	Gimcheon Indoor Swimming Pool; Suwon World Cup Stadium Swimming Pool	No guests	Overcome the fear of diving
5	16	August 4, 2013	SBS Deungchon-dong; Open Hall	Dynamic Duo, Epik High, Duble Sidekick	Create and perform your own song
5	17	August 11, 2013	Seoul (Various Celebrities Homes)	Dynamic Duo, Epik High, Duble Sidekick	Create and perform your own song
5	18	August 18, 2013	Seoul (Various Celebrities Homes)	Dynamic Duo, Epik High, Duble Sidekick	Create and perform your own song
6	18	August 18, 2013	Seoul (Various Celebrities Homes)	Kim Na-woon	Making home cooked meals
6	19	August 25, 2013	Seoul (Various Celebrities Homes)	Kim Na-woon	Making home cooked meals
6	19	August 25, 2013	Seoul (Various Celebrities Homes)	Tony An, Moon Hee-joon	Making home cooked meals
6	19	August 25, 2013	Seoul (Various Celebrities Homes)	Hong Jin-kyung	Making home cooked meals
6	20	September 1, 2013	Seoul (Various Celebrities Homes)	Hong Jin-kyung	Making home cooked meals
6	20	September 1, 2013	Seoul (Various Celebrities Homes)	Kim Ji-hoon, Lee Ki-woo, Tak Jae-hoon	Making home cooked meals
6	20	September 1, 2013	Seoul (Various Celebrities Homes)	Jung Eun-ji, Lee Hye-jung	Making home cooked meals
6	21 (Note: Uee was unable to attend due to schedule conflicts.)	September 8, 2013	Seoul (Various Celebrities Homes)	Jung Eun-ji, Lee Hye-jung	Making home cooked meals
6	21	September 8, 2013	Seoul (Various Celebrities Homes)	Jung Eun-ji, Bobby Kim, Gummy	Making home cooked meals
6	22	September 15, 2013	Seoul (Various Celebrities Homes)	Hong Seok-cheon, Fujita Sayuri, Kim Heung-kook	Making home cooked meals
6	23 (Note: Kim Hyun-joong was unable to attend due to schedule conflicts.)	September 22, 2013	Seoul (Various Celebrities Homes)	Shim Hye-jin, Jeong Jun-ha, Kim Young-chul	Making home cooked meals
6	24	September 29, 2013	Seoul (Various Celebrities Homes)	Hong Seo-beom, Jo Gap-kyeong, Jun Hyun-moo, Shim Yi-young	Making home cooked meals
6	25	October 6, 2013	Seoul (Various Celebrities Homes)	Kim Cheong, K.Will, Huh Gak, Bora	Making home cooked meals
6	26	October 13, 2013	Seoul (Various Celebrities Homes)	Kim Hyung-ja, Brian, Bada	Making home cooked meals
6	27	October 20, 2013	Seoul (Various Celebrities Homes)	Tae Jin-ah, Eru, Shin Hye-sung, Lee Min-woo, Sung Hoon	Making home cooked meals
6	28	October 27, 2013	Seoul (Various Celebrities Homes)	Park Jun-gyu, Han Eun-jung	Making home cooked meals
6	29	November 3, 2013	Seoul (Various Celebrities Homes)	Insooni, Hong Jin-young, Kim Ji-min	Making home cooked meals
6	30	November 10, 2013	Seoul (Various Celebrities Homes)	Kim Ga-yeon, Lim Yo-hwan, Lee Hyun-do, Choi Hong-man	Making home cooked meals
6	31	November 17, 2013	Seoul (Various Celebrities Homes)	Kim Jung-nan, Shinee	Making home cooked meals

== Ratings ==
In the ratings below, the highest rating for the show will in be red, and the lowest rating for the show will be in blue. Ratings listed below are the individual corner ratings of Barefooted Friends. (Note: Individual corner ratings do not include commercial time, which regular ratings include.)

Episode #	Original Airdate	TNmS Ratings		AGB Ratings	
Episode #	Original Airdate	Nationwide	Seoul National Capital Area	Nationwide	Seoul National Capital Area
1	April 21, 2013	4.8%	4.9%	5.6%	5.6%
2	April 28, 2013	4.3%	5.3%	5.1%	5.1%
3	May 5, 2013	3.3%	4.1%	2.9%	3.6%
4	May 12, 2013	4.2%	4.4%	4.7%	5.5%
5	May 19, 2013	3.4%	3.5%	4.4%	4.8%
6	May 26, 2013	3.4%	3.8%	5.4%	7.0%
7	June 2, 2013	5.1%	5.4%	5.2%	5.4%
8	June 9, 2013	4.8%	4.8%	5.6%	6.0%
9	June 16, 2013	4.3%	4.7%	4.6%	4.8%
10	June 23, 2013	5.5%	5.8%	5.6%	6.4%
11	June 30, 2013	5.2%	6.2%	4.8%	5.1%
12	July 7, 2013	5.6%	5.8%	6.6%	7.0%
13	July 14, 2013	7.5%	8.6%	7.3%	7.4%
14	July 21, 2013	5.9%	6.5%	6.0%	6.1%
15	July 28, 2013	6.3%	7.3%	6.7%	6.9%
16	August 4, 2013	5.4%	6.0%	3.4%	5.0%
17	August 11, 2013	3.4%	4.2%	3.4%	3.5%
18	August 18, 2013	3.7%	4.9%	4.0%	4.5%
19	August 25, 2013	6.3%	6.9%	6.0%	6.0%
20	September 1, 2013	5.5%	6.2%	5.8%	5.9%
21	September 8, 2013	4.8%	5.4%	6.1%	6.5%
22	September 15, 2013	5.0%	6.1%	5.3%	5.5%
23	September 22, 2013	4.6%	4.9%	5.5%	5.4%
24	September 29, 2013	5.1%	5.9%	6.2%	5.6%
25	October 6, 2013	6.3%	7.0%	6.6%	6.2%
26	October 13, 2013	4.8%	5.6%	5.2%	5.3%
27	October 20, 2013	5.1%	6.7%	5.6%	5.2%
28	October 27, 2013	6.5%	7.6%	7.9%	8.0%
29	November 3, 2013	5.2%	6.6%	6.2%	5.6%
30	November 10, 2013	4.2%	5.3%	4.7%	5.1%
31	November 17, 2013	5.2%	5.9%	5.4%	5.5%

== Awards and achievements ==
Year	Awards
2013	1st Gimcheon International Masters Diving Competition (July 11); Special Award - Barefooted Friends members
2013	2013 SBS Entertainment Awards (December 30); Producer Award - Kang Ho-dong
