= A Battle of One Voice: 300 =

- Promotional poster for season 1
- Genre: Music show Variety show
- Presented by: Kang Ho-dong
- Starring: See below
- Country of origin: South Korea
- Original language: Korean
- No. of seasons: 2
- No. of episodes: 13

Original release
- Network: tvN
- Release: 31 August 2018 – 21 June 2019

A Battle of One Voice: 300 (Korean: 하나의 목소리 전쟁: 300; lit. One Voice War: 300) is a South Korean television program that aired on tvN. It is hosted by Kang Ho-dong.

Season 1 aired on Fridays at 19:40 (KST), from August 31, 2018 to September 28, 2018.

Season 2, titled 300 X2 (300 엑스투), aired from May 3, 2019 to June 21, 2019 on Fridays at 19:40 (KST). For the season, Boom and Shindong (Super Junior) has joined the show's cast as "Singalong Fairies".

== Program ==
Season 1: 8 groups of singers each attempt to gather 300 fans to form teams and pit themselves against one another in a battle of chorus performance stages without any form of rehearsals. The final winner of this series wins ₩100,000,000. After each episode, the audio tracks of the performances will be released as digital singles, under "tvN 300 X NC Fever Music".

Season 2: Unlike Season 1, there will be no battles. Instead, one act and 300 of the fans of the act selected for the show will appear each episode and have a singalong session together. The program will showcase the progress of the session, starting from 10 hours before the session starts. The program will also interview the celebrities and some of the fans who have been chosen for the session and their stories that they want to share for the act to hear.

=== Battle format (for Season 1 only) ===
==== Qualifiers ====
- The studio is specially made to fit a total of 600 fans on two sides of the stage, each side having 300 fans.
- Sitting between the two sides are 5 celebrity judges and a passionate judge squad of 100 people, who will then assess the performances and give a score. The 5 celebrity judges each hold 20 points, choosing the side that they each prefer. Each of the 100 people from the passionate judge squad has to choose one of the 2 performances, with each person holding 2 points.
- There is an attendance rule that if there is no full attendance of 300, points will be taken off from the total score. (e.g. if there are only 250 fans gathered in the team, the team will have 50 points deducted after the choices of the 5 celebrity judges)
- The higher scoring singer for each battle advances to the final.

==== Final ====
- The studio is specially made to fit a total of 1,200 fans on 4 sides of the stage, each side having 300 fans.
- Sitting in between are 5 celebrity judges who each hold 60 points, adding up to a total of 300 points. They will assess each performance and give a score.
- There is an attendance rule that if there is no full attendance of 300, points will be taken off from the total score. (e.g. if there are only 250 fans gathered in the team, the team will have 50 points deducted after the choices of the 5 celebrity judges)
- The highest scoring singer wins the series.

=== Session Run-through (for Season 2 only) ===
- Fans who are interested to join in as part of the 300 fans will have to register through the show's official website, and only the picked 300 fans will attend the recording of the episode.
- About 10 hours before the meeting between the act and the fans, the former will gather in the 300 Room together with the Singalong Fairies. They will have some time to interact with the chosen 300 fans through a secret chat room created, plus giving some pointers to what are to be done for the chorus performance later.
- At the start of the session, the act and the fans are separated by a large black curtain, and as the act performs their opening song, the fans are not to make any noise in order to create some surprise elements for the act. In the middle of this song, the large curtain will fall and both sides are able to see each other. The act will then continue the performance together with the cheering of the fans.
- There is a big change to the attendance rule for this season. Depending on the number of fans that have attended and 1 fan represents ₩100,000, the show will donate the amount of money corresponding to the number of fans that have attended to Musistance (e.g. if there are only 250 fans gathered in the team, the show will donate ₩2,500,000). If all 300 fans are gathered in the studio, the show will donate double the amount of ₩3,000,000 (₩6,000,000) under the name of the act and 300 Singalong Group (e.g. Twice X 300 Singalong Group).

== Cast ==
=== Host ===
- Kang Ho-dong (Season 1-2)
- Boom (Season 2, as "Singalong Fairy")
- Shindong (Super Junior) (Season 2, as "Singalong Fairy"; absent for episodes 3, 7)

=== Celebrity Judges (for Season 1 only) ===
- Heo Cham (Television host)
- Kim Hyeong-seok (Composer, producer) (Absent for episode 5)
- Kim Eana (Lyricist)
- Lia Kim (Dancer, choreographer)
- Moon Gabi (Model)
- Yoon Sang (Music producer, singer) (For only episode 5)

=== Contestants (for Season 1 only) ===
- Kim Yeon-ja
- Yoon Min-soo (Vibe)
- Wheesung
- UV (Yoo Se-yoon + Muzie)
- Loco & Gray
- Lovelyz
- iKON
- Weki Meki

== Episodes ==
=== Season 1 ===
List of episodes (episode 1 – 5)

Episode #	Broadcast Date	Team	Attendance Check	Song(s) Performed	Final Score	Winner	Note(s)
1	August 31, 2018	Loco & Gray; 300 Leaders: Sleepy, Han Hee-jun	273/300	I'm Not The One You Used To Know (니가 알던 내가 아냐) + No Manners (무례하게)	125	Loco & Gray	—
1	August 31, 2018	UV; 300 Leaders: Lee Se-young, Jang Moon-bok, Greg Priester	264/300	Probation (집행유애)	112	Loco & Gray	—
2	September 7, 2018	Kim Yeon-ja; 300 Leaders: Jang Dong-min, Kim Dong-hyun, Bae Myeong-ho	278/300	Amor Fati – DJ Koo Remix (아모르 파티 – DJ Koo Remix)	130	Kim Yeon-ja	—
2	September 7, 2018	Weki Meki; 300 Leaders: Park Sung-kwang, Yoo Jae-hwan	272/300	Sunset Glow (붉은노을)	120	Kim Yeon-ja	—
3	September 14, 2018	iKON; 300 Leaders: Lee Sang-hoon, Jang Do-yeon	300/300	Love Scenario (사랑을 했다) + B-Day (벌떼)	128	Wheesung	—
3	September 14, 2018	Wheesung; 300 Leaders: Kim Ho-young, Lee Guk-joo	262/300	Insomnia (불면증)	134	Wheesung	—
4	September 21, 2018	Yoon Min-soo; 300 Leaders: Kwon Hyuk-soo, Kangnam	282/300	Drinking (술이야)	174	Yoon Min-soo	—
4	September 21, 2018	Lovelyz; 300 Leaders: Lee Yong-jin, Lee Jin-ho	273/300	Ah-Choo (아츄)	81	Yoon Min-soo	—
5	September 28, 2018	Wheesung; 300 Leaders: Kim Ho-young, Lee Guk-joo	261/300	Heartsore Story (가슴 시린 이야시) + Even Thought of Marriage (결혼까지 생각했어)	223	Yoon Min-soo	—
5	September 28, 2018	Yoon Min-soo; 300 Leaders: Lee Sang-hoon, Kim Ji-min	278/300	All You Need Is Love	244	Yoon Min-soo	—
5	September 28, 2018	Kim Yeon-ja; 300 Leaders: Yoo Jae-hwan, Jang Moon-bok	263/300	Celeb Five (I Wanna Be A Celeb) (셀럽파이브 - 셀럽이 되도 싶어)	215	Yoon Min-soo	—
5	September 28, 2018	Loco & Gray; 300 Leaders: Sleepy, Han Hee-jun	262/300	I'm Fine (잘) + Respect	223	Yoon Min-soo	—

=== Season 2 ===
List of episodes (episode 1 – 8)

Ep. #	Broadcast Date	Artist(s)	Attendance Check	Chorus Song(s) Selected	Note(s)
1	May 3, 2019	Twice	300/300	What Is Love? + Cheer Up	Lee Sang-hoon, Song Young-gil and Kwon Hyuk-soo appeared as part of the fans
2	May 10, 2019	Norazo	262/300	Superman (슈퍼맨)	Yoo Jae-hwan, Nature, DreamNote and Pink Fantasy appeared as part of the fans
3	May 17, 2019	K.Will	292/300	Day 1 (오늘부터 1일) + My Heart Beating (가슴이 뛴다)	Yoo Jae-hwan stood in for Shindong as a Singalong Fairy for this episode; Kim Seung-hye, Park So-young, Ahn So-mi and Kim Soo-chan appeared as part of the fans
4	May 24, 2019	Mamamoo	300/300	Décalcomanie (데칼코마니)	Lee Se-young and Yoo Jae-hwan appeared as part of the fans
5	May 31, 2019	Seventeen	300/300	Clap (박수) + Very Nice (아주 NICE)	Lee Sang-hoon, Ha Ji-young and Yoo Jae-hwan appeared as part of the fans
6	June 7, 2019	Kim Jong-jin	243/300	Bravo, My Life!	Special performance appearances by Kim Joon-hyeon, Nine9 & dear cloud, O.O.O and The Rose; Song Young-gil and Yoo Jae-hwan appeared as part of the fans
7	June 14, 2019	Hong Jin-young	291/300	Love Battery (사랑의 배터리) + Ring Ring (따르릉)	Kim Ho-young stood in for Shindong as a Singalong Fairy for this episode; Kwon Hyuk-soo and Yoo Jae-hwan appeared as part of the fans
8	June 21, 2019	Red Velvet	281/300	Red Flavor (빨간 맛)	Kim Sung-won, Ryu Geun-ji, Lee Se-jin, Seo Tae-hoon, Yoo Jae-hwan and Na Ha-eun appeared as part of the fans

== Ratings ==
In the ratings below, the Low rating for the show will be in red and the High rating for the show will be in blue.

=== Season 1 ===
List of ratings (episode 1 – 5)

Episode	Date	AGB Nielsen
Episode	Date	Nationwide
1	August 31, 2018	1.168%
2	September 7, 2018	1.130%
3	September 14, 2018	1.018%
4	September 21, 2018	0.869%
5	September 28, 2018	1.097%

=== Season 2 ===
List of ratings (episode 1 – 8)

Episode	Date	AGB Nielsen
Episode	Date	Nationwide
1	May 3, 2019	0.981%
2	May 10, 2019	1.064%
3	May 17, 2019	1.156%
4	May 24, 2019	1.197%
5	May 31, 2019	0.854%
6	June 7, 2019	0.737%
7	June 14, 2019	1.635%
8	June 21, 2019	0.864%

- Note that the show airs on a cable channel (pay TV), which plays part in its slower uptake and relatively small audience share when compared to programs broadcast (FTA) on public networks such as KBS, SBS, MBC or EBS.
- NR rating means "not reported".
