= Chicken fight (disambiguation) =

A chicken fight is a water game.

Chicken fight may also refer to:

- Cockfight, a fight between roosters
- Chicken (game), a confrontational game using vehicles
- Chicken fight (Family Guy), a recurring gag in the TV series Family Guy
- A South Korean game, often played during the harvest festival Chuseok
