= X-Man (game show) =

South Korean game show

- Genre: Game show Comedy
- Starring: Yoo Jae-suk; Kang Ho-dong; Kim Je-dong (S.1–23); Gong Hyung-jin (S.24–34); Park Kyung-lim (S.35–59); Lee Hyuk-jae (S.60–90)
- Country of origin: South Korea
- Original language: Korean
- No. of seasons: 2
- No. of episodes: 178 (list of episodes)

Production
- Producer: Jang Hyuk-jae
- Running time: 50-80 minutes

Original release
- Network: SBS
- Release: November 8, 2003 – April 8, 2007

Related
- Good Sunday; Real Situation Saturday

X-Man (Korean: X맨) is a popular South Korean game show that ran from November 8, 2003 to April 8, 2007 on SBS. Its popularity peaked from 2004 to 2006. It was hosted by Yoo Jae-suk, Kang Ho-dong, Kim Je-dong, with Kim being successively replaced by Gong Hyung-jin, Park Kyung-lim, and Lee Hyuk-jae; only the first two were on the program since its inception.

X-man was loosely based on The Mole.

== History ==
The program first aired on November 8, 2003 as a "Genuine Psychological Reasoning Variety", Real Situation: Finding X-man (실제상황 X맨을 찾아라), a corner program of Real Situation Saturday. On October 10, 2004, the program was moved to Good Sunday and simply known as X-man. On November 5, 2006, the program became the sole program airing in Good Sunday and was officially known as X-man Good Sunday airing until April 8, 2007.

=== Real Situation Saturday era ===
In the first season of the program, the main host was Kim Je-dong, with team leaders Kang Ho-dong and Yoo Jae-suk of Kang and Yoo Team respectively. Beginning with Season 2, Yoo Jae-suk replaced Kim Je-dong as main host, with Kim Je-dong becoming the leader of Kim Team (Yoo Team in Season 2). During this early stages of the program, popular games which became staples of the show were Team! Horse Riding, Tongue Twisters Relay, and Fly! Fryingpan with the biggest hit Of Course! created in May 2004.

=== Good Sunday era ===
Following high ratings in the Saturday evening timeslot, X-man was moved to Good Sunday in October 2004, which was the lowest rated program of the Sunday evening timeslot. After the move, Good Sunday became the top rated program of the Sunday evening timeslot, beating incumbent MBC's Sunday Sunday Night by 2006. As the program aired under Good Sunday, a line up of changes occurred to the opposing team of Kang Team. The team leaders changed from Kim Je-dong to Gong Hyung-jin, Park Kyung-lim, and finally Lee Hyuk-jae. Popular mission Team! Horse Riding was abolished in April 2005 following the injury of comedian Kim Ki-wook during the game. Team! Chicken Fight and Team! "Go" Fighting later replaced it. Also in 2005, popular mission Couples and Warriors Forever became a hot topic following the fabulous performances by guests, which were intended to form couples to play couple games.

=== X-man Good Sunday era ===
Logo of New X-man

With the Autumn Program Restructuring of 2006, the second corner program of Good Sunday was cancelled, with X-man reformatted and airing as a stand-alone program. Airing in X-man Good Sunday was New X-man, abandoning the psychological game format and finding the team disruptor, the X-man became the top choice among various celebrities of surveys. Therefore, the objective of the game was to guess who would be the #1 vote-getter and trade the X-man over to the other team. The only time this was possible was when the team won a mission, after which they would have the chance to either retrieve someone from the other team or send someone over. Teams were chosen through a lottery system, with MC Yoo serving as the "divider". The number he picked served as the dividing line between the teams (with Kang Ho-dong getting the guests with earlier numbers, and Lee Hyuk-jae getting the later numbers). The team who has the X-man at the end loses the entire "game". Unfortunately, the new format did not prove to be popular and was cancelled following the Spring Program Restructuring of 2007. It was replaced by Haja! Go! (하자!고), which was also hosted by Yoo Jae-suk, with Kang Ho-dong moving to KBS's Happy Sunday. X-man became the last program South Korea's top MCs Yoo Jae-suk and Kang Ho-dong worked together.

== Format ==
Each season was divided into two episodes, airing in consecutive weeks. The first season was divided into six episodes, with three chances to find the X-man. The second and third season was divided into four episodes, with two chances. As of the fourth season, challengers only had one chance (two episodes) to find the X-man. The various celebrities were divided into two teams, with one led by Kang Ho-dong (Kang Team) and the second by the other main MC. Yoo Jae-suk served as the show's mediator and main MC. At the start of each episode, one celebrity would be chosen by the producer to be the X-man, whose main mission was to disrupt teamwork in his or her team and purposely throw challenges while keeping his or her identity a secret. Winning teams of each mission would be awarded ₩1 million. Actual amounts were undisclosed after earlier seasons.

After all the missions, the guests then voted on who they think is the X-man. The celebrity participant who was chosen was then digitally "fingerprinted" to see if the others chose correctly. If the others chose correctly, any money earned by the teams was donated to charity, under the names of the various guests. If they failed to find the X-man, the X-man was considered to have succeeded and the money donated to charity was given under the X-man's name.

== Missions ==
X-man has featured many missions that have become very popular with the general audience. Missions consisted of various physical and mental games that changed every few months.

List of missions

Main Missions

- Team! Horse Riding (단결! 말타기) [Season 1-34] - A traditional Korean game where a horse is formed a (defending) team of men bent down supporting each other with a man standing at the front (the head). The other (attacking) team will jump onto the horse, trying to stay on the horse until all members are on. The defending team must support the other team without collapsing. If all members are on the horse, then the first member in line and the head will play rock-paper-scissors to decide the winner.
- Tongue Twisters Relay (줄줄이 말해요) [Season 1-13,24] - All members of a team must correctly say tongue twisters in relay in a certain time limit.
- (Run!) Balloon/Couple Quiz ((달려라!) 붕선/커플 귀즈) [Season 3-9,12,13] - A quiz of 10 questions usually relating to the guests of that season, using couples.
- New Marriages are Beautiful (신혼은 아름다워) [Season 2-10] - Couples of each team must complete an obstacle course the fastest.
- Of Course! (당연하지!) [Season 10-70] - A game where two members face off in asking each other (embarrassing) questions and the opponent must say "Of Course!". A member loses if they are unable to say Of Course! or are knocked down by their opponent. This was an order-deciding game for Tongue Twisters Relay from Season 10-13.
- Couples and Warriors Forever (커플장사 만만세) [Season 11,14-70] - A couple event where male and female members of each team pair up and play games. Performances and dances are usually involved in the selection round. During Season 66 and 67, a survival element was added, where right after a male performs, he will choose who he wants to be his partner. If she accepts, they immediately become couples, but she can still change her mind if another male chooses her afterwards.
- Team! Chicken Fight (단결! 닭싸움) [Season 30,36-39,41,44-47,49,51] - A traditional Korean game where teams will chicken fight where you stand on one leg and try to knock your opponents while grabbing onto the other ankle. This was a secondary mission in Season 30.
- Team! "Go" Fighting (단결! 고싸움) [Season 48,50,52-61,64] - Teams are standing on a raised platform and must push the other team off. This was a warm-up game in Season 61.
- Survival Skybridge (서바이벌 구름따리) [Season 63-70] - Two teams must eliminate the opposing team using only a skybridge to get between. This was a warm-up game in Season 64.

Secondary Missions

- Baby Warriors (아기 천하장사) [Season 1] - A member of each team wears a sumo wrestler-like suit and needs to push the opposing member out of the ring.
- Catch Loves Ball (사랑은 공을 타고~) [Season 1] - Couples must shoot a ball from their mouth and catch it.
- Who is it? (누굴까요?) [Season 1] - Teams must guess who on the other team is carrying a pumpkin, where the other team is carrying fake pumpkins as well.
- Balance Beam Fight (평균대 결투) [Season 1] - A member of each team stand on a balance beam with pans on their hands and must push the opposing member off.
- Love's Chopsticks (사랑의 젓가락) [Season 1] - Couples must maneuver a giant pair of "chopsticks" and move pots to a farther stand.
- Let's Study (공부합시다) [Season 1] - Teams must memorize the order of fifty countries in five minutes and alternate reciting them correctly.
- Piggyback Toy Hammers (어부바 뿅망치) [Season 1] - A member of each team is piggybacked by another member of their team and must break the other piggybacked opponents balloon attached to their head with a toy hammer.
- Newspaper Game (신문지 게임) [Season 1] - Couples must stand within a newspaper as it gets smaller each round.
- Team Telepathy (단결 이심전심) [Season 1] - Teams must pull a table cloth from under a set of dinnerware and not have any of the items move in succession.
- Lion! Grasshopper! Relay (포자! 메뚜기! 릴레이) - Similar to New Marriages are Beautiful, a member of each team dressed in either a lion costume (representing Kang Team) or a grasshopper costume (representing Yu Team), must complete an obstacle course the fastest.
- Love~ Message! (러브~ 메시지!) [Season 2,3] - Couples must send a message to each other using only actions.
- Team! Feet Feet (단결! 다리다리) [Season 2,27,35] - Teams must have a designated number of feet standing on the ground. This was an order-deciding mission in Season 7 and a main mission in Season 35.
- Team! Catch the Tail (단결! 꼬리잡기) [Season 2,29,43] - The head (first member) of the team must catch the tail (last member) of the other team while keeping the team connected to each other. This was a main mission in Season 43.
- High Jump (높이 뛰기) [Season 2] - Males and females of each team compete in high jump separately.
- Survival Push Over (서바이벌 밀어내기) [Season 2] - A member of each team must push each other over using only their hands.
- Queen Bee Chicken Fighting (여왕벌 닭싸움) [Season 2] - The same as Team! Chicken Fight, a traditional Korean game where teams will chicken fight where you stand on one leg and try to knock your opponents while grabbing onto the other ankle, except teams must attack/protect the "Queen" from falling.
- Hug~ Your Love!! (사랑을 그대 품~안에!!) [Season 3] - Couples where a member of each team is connected with an elastic belt, and the other member is at either end with a balloon. The member connected to the elastic belt must get to the balloon and break it first by hugging.
- Skewered Relay (꼬치꼬치 릴레이) [Season 3] - Teams are connected to each other in an outfit and race to a turning point and back.
- Fly Frypan (날아라 프라이팬) [Season 9-19,21-23,25,26] - A game where a member of a team calls out the name of a member on the other team and a number. That member must say their name corresponding to the number given, following a rhythm and pattern. This continues until someone makes a mistake, and frypans "fly" and hit the heads of their team.
- Team! Hula Hoop (단결! 훌라후프) [Season 32] - All members of each team must successfully jump through a hula hoop rolling at them.
- Team! Balloon Dodgeball (단결! 풍선피구) [Season 53] - Each team must throw a ball at a balloon attached to an opposing members butt and break it in succession.
- Grab the Belt of Yudo (유도의 끈을잡고) [Season 65] - A member of each team must take the belt off of the opposing member.
- Endure Pater (파테르 버티기) [Season 67] - A member of each team must stay within a designated area for five seconds to win.
- Touch Touch Wrestling (터치터치 레슬링) [Season 69,70] - The same as Endure Pater, except they are able to change out with another member by touching them.

Order-deciding/Warm-Up Games

- Survival Chicken Fight (서바이벌 닭싸움) [Season 1,59] - A traditional Korean game where teams will chicken fight where you stand on one leg and try to knock your opponents while grabbing onto the other ankle. This differs from the main mission as it was played one vs. one on a survival basis.
- (Frog/Survival/Gomusin) Butt Pushing ((개구리/서바이벌/고무신) 엉덩이 밀치기) [Season 1-11,16,20,22,24,30,35,37,44,46,52,60] - A member of each team must push the opposing member's butt and knock them over. In Frog Butt Pushing, members kneel down in a frog position and are able to move within a designated area. In Survival Butt Pushing, it is played as a team. In Gomusin Butt Pushing, members grab the gomusin underneath and must break the balloon attached to the opponents waist.
- Survival Pull The Rope (서바이벌 줄당기기) [Season 2] - A member of each team has a rope wrapped around both waists. They must pull the rope in their favor to make the opponent fall.
- Survival X-man (서바이벌 X맨) [Season 2] - A member of each team shouts "X-man" and points either to the left or right in front of the opponents face. The opponents head needs to move to the opposite direction.
- Talk Fight (말싸움) [Season 3] - Similar to Of Course!, a member of each team must verbally "attack" their opponent.
- Hand Push Over ((쭈글쭈글) 손바닥 밀치기) [Season 3,21,25,28,31,32,34,40,42,51] - The same as Survival Push Over, a member of each team must push each other over using only their hands.
- Scary Hand Wrestling (공포의 손씨름) [Season 5] - A member of each team holds each other's hand and "wrestle" each other.
- Survival Foot Wrestling (서바이벌 발씨름) [Season 6] - A member of each team is sitting with their hands under their legs and must push the opposing member over or out of the ring.
- Toy Hammer Turn Turn (뿅망치 돌아돌아) [Season 12] - A member of each team must follow a circle using their knees and must hit the opposing member with a toy hammer.
- Survival Handkerchief Wrestling (서바이벌 수건씨름) [Season 13] - A member of each team must pull the handkerchief that is held between both members knees away from the opponent.
- Cushion Pushing (방석 밀치기) [Season 13] - The same as Hand Push Over, except the members are sitting on top of a pile of cushions.
- Lose Wrestling (지는 씨름) [Season 15, 26,36,43,45] - A member of each team wrestle each other but win by losing in traditional Korean wrestling, ssireum.
- (Survival/Relay) Take Off Stockings ((서바이벌/릴레이) 양말벗기) [Season 17,40,62] - Teams must race to take off their stockings.
- Head Archery (헤드 양궁) [Season 18] - Members wear a hat with a scoreboard and must throw a ball and try to land it in the center.
- Fly Super Board (날아라 슈퍼보드) [Season 23] - A member of each team stand on an unbalanced "super board" and must push the opponent over.
- Indian Dance (인디언 댄스) [Season 27] - A member of each team must dance to music and then step on the balloons attached to the opponent's feet.
- Stretch Your Legs (다리다리 쭉쭉) [Season 29] - A member of each team must stretch their legs to designated points. The member that can stretch farthest and support itself will win.
- Butt Push Koong (엉덩이 쿵) [Season 33] - Similar to Butt Pushing, a member of each team must push the opposing member's butt, attempting to knock them over, then grab the towel underneath.
- Catch the Gomusin (고무신 잡기) [Season 39,41] - A member of each team must toss their gomusin, catch it and break the balloon on the opposing member's butt first.
- Bucket Punch! Punch! (양동이 펀치! 펀치!) [Season 47,49] - A member of each team stand in metal buckets and push knock the opposing member over.
- Take Off the Rubber Gloves (고무장갑을 벗겨라) [Season 48] - A member of each team must grab the rubber gloves off the opposing member first.
- Be Careful of the Cold~ (감기 조심하세요~) [Season 50] - A member of each team must grab the scarf off the opposing member first.
- Apple Game (으랏차차 사과놀이) [Season 55] - A member of each team must knock off an apple attached to a helmet with a sword.
- Team! Butt Wrestling (단결! 엉덩이씨름) [Season 56,57] - Similar to Butt Pushing, teams will gradually add members throughout rounds and must push the other team's butt and knock them over.
- Tail Bites Tail (꼬리에 꼬리를 물고) [Season 58] - Same as Team! Catch the Tail, the head (first member) of the team must catch the tail (last member) of the other team while keeping the team connected to each other, except the number of members increases each round.

Special Missions These missions were played during a special (event).

- Team!/"Go" Fighting/in Water (단결!/수중 고싸움) [Season 10,40,54,62,68] - Teams are standing on a floating platform on water and must push the other team off.
- Team! Water Splash (단결! 물튀기기) [Season 40] - Teams must accumulate more water through collecting splashes of water created by its members diving into a pool.
- Hot Spring! Ram's War (온천! 양의전쟁) [Season 54] - A member of each team must grab the towel off the opposing members head first.
- Floating Canoe (부표카누) [Season 54] - Teams must successfully balance on a floating platform together. The team with the fastest time will win.
- Float Arm Wrestling (부표 팔씨름) [Season 54] - A member of each team must arm wrestle each other into water on a float.
- Ting Ting Teng Teng Rice Table Game (팅팅탱탱 밥상놀이) [Season 54] - Identical to Fly Frypan except the losing team hits their head on a rice table instead of frypans.
- World Cup Just Kick It (월드컵 발로차) [Season 56-58] - In support of the 2006 FIFA World Cup, members must shoot into a goal. The team with the most goals will win.
- Catch-Up To Michelle Wie (미셜위 따리잡기) [Season 61] - A game competing against Michelle Wie where members must shoot golf balls to hit gongs for points.
- Hit The Target (과녁을 맞어라) [Season 61] - A game competing against Michelle Wie where members must shoot golf balls to hit panels for points.
- Challenge! Penalty Shootout (도전! 승부차기) [Season 61,63] - In support of the 2006 FIFA World Cup, members must shoot more into each other's goals to win.
- World Cup Vaulting Competition (월드컵 뜀틀대회) [Season 62] - Teams must attempt to jump higher than previous attempts.
- X-man's Reenactment (X맨의 재구성) [Season 62,68] - Teams must correctly act out scenes from famous dramas. The team who successfully acts out all scenes will win.
- Ddui Ddui Bbang Bbang Bus Game (뛰뛰빵빵 버스놀이) [Season 66] - Similar to Fly Frypan, members are on a bus and calls out an opposing members name, a number and a command, whether to get on or off. That member and its corresponding number of members in line will either say "Hello" or "Getting Off", and the member called will call out the next member. If a command was not called, then the corresponding number of members in line will say the previous command. Anyone who makes a mistake, a set of skeletons will drop in front of their team.
- Know Your Multiplication (구구단을 외자고~) [Season 68] - Each member faces off against MC Yu in multiplication. The team that wins against MC Yu will win, if both teams win, a special round is played between the two teams.
- Swim Cap Relay (수영모 릴레이) [Season 68] - A member of each team swim to the other end to retrieve a swim cap underwater, put it on and return first.

New X-man Missions

- Dodgeball King X (피구왕X) [Season 1,2,4-8,10-20] - Similar to traditional dodgeball, teams attempt to throw a ball at each other and are eliminated if the ball touches them. If the ball is caught, then an eliminated member may return to play. The game ends when all members of a team are eliminated. From Season 16-20, the rules changed to Touch Dodgeball, where a maximum of five team members play at a time and may switch out with other members by touching them. Catching a ball no longer brings back an eliminated player. There is also a "Safe Zone" in the center of each team's court, where a player will not be eliminated even if they are hit by the ball as long as they are in that circle.
- Hand Separate, Lips Separate, Together Disagreeing (손따로 입따로 언행불일치) [Season 1,3,7-10] - Each team faces off against MC Yu individually, where they must say a number from one to five, and show a different number of fingers, and continue doing so until someone makes a mistake. The team that wins against MC Yu will win, if both teams win, a special round is played between the two teams.
- Star Battle Cold-Hearted OX (스타배틀 냉정한OX) [Season 1-20] - A member of each team performs to a panel of seven "cold-hearted" judges, composed of show staff members of varying age and gender, who judge based on their personal preference. The individual with the highest score's team will win. If both teams have a member with the same highest score, the team with the most highest score's will win.
  - Rookie Battle Cold-Hearted OX (신인배틀 냉정한OX) [Season 10] - Same as Star Battle Cold-Hearted OX, except featuring the rookies of that season and they are judged by their seniors from the opposite team. This mission was incorporated into Star Battle Cold-Hearted OX in future seasons.
- The Stairs of Possibility (설마의 계단) [Season 2-4] - A deciding discussion mission to determine who is most likely to be the X-man. MC Yu asks questions relating to that seasons topic. If a challenger believes they personally agree to that question, they step up the Stairs of Possibility. At the end of the questions, whoever is standing on the top of the Stairs of Possibility is a strong X-man candidate.
- Don't Ask Envelopes (묻지마 봉투) [Season 5,6] - A suspicion discussion mission to determine who is more likely to be the X-man. Challengers write questions to the final X-man candidates prior to this mission and are hidden in discreet envelopes. The final X-man candidates choose an envelope and answers the question, which may help the team leader decide who is most likely to be the X-man.
- Challenge! 3.3.3! Three Worded Poems (도전! 3.3.3! 삼행시) [Season 8-13,15-19] - A game where two members face off using the opponents name as the first "word" in the three phrases to "attack" each other. A member loses if they are unable to come up with a phrase using the name or are GGed by their opponent.
- Wrestling King X (씨름왕X) [Season 14] - A special Lunar New Year mission where members wrestle each other in traditional Korean wrestling, ssireum. This mission is divided into three groups: females, "young boys" and "old boys". Only the "old boys" division plays with a cloth wrapped around both members waist and must pull it in their favor to make the opponent fall.

== Hosts ==
- Yoo Jae-suk: Main Host, Season 1 Yoo Team Team Leader
- Kang Ho-dong: Kang Team Team Leader
- Kim Je-dong (November 8, 2003 – November 28, 2004): Kim Team Team Leader, Season 1 Main Host
- Gong Hyung-jin (December 5, 2004 – May 1, 2005): Gong Team Team Leader
- Park Kyung-lim (May 8, 2005 – April 30, 2006): Park Team Team Leader
- Lee Hyuk-jae (May 7, 2006 – April 8, 2007): Lee Team Team Leader

== Trivia ==
- Kim Je-dong was the only MC on X-man to have his team name written in Hanja as opposed to the traditional Hangul. This may be because the Hangul for Kang (강) and Kim (김) are very close to one another.
- The original team names, Kang (강) and Yoo (유), were actually meant in Hanja for Korean: 강; Hanja: 强 as in strong and Korean: 유; Hanja: 柔 as in tender, representing Kang Ho-dong and Yoo Jae-suk respectively, but were disregarded once Kim Je-dong became team leader.
- When identifying who is X-man, if the suspect was X-man, the screen read "Identical" (일치), if the suspect was not X-man, it would read "Discordant" (불일치) and carbon dioxide would be sprayed in the form of an "X" in front of the suspect. Starting in Season 65, the Couple Event took place in a different set resembling a forest, the "finger-print ceremony" took place there as well, but lacking a screen, in which "Identical" would be represented by fireworks, and "Discordant" was still represented by "X" carbon dioxide.
- Originally, suspects were identified corresponding to the number of votes received, but after earlier seasons, after incorrectly identifying X-man, he/she was simply revealed by MC Yoo in order to save time.

== Awards and achievements ==
Year	Awards
2007	2007 SBS Entertainment Awards (December 30); Korean Wave Program Award - X-man; Grand Award (Daesang) - Kang Ho-dong
