= Bae Seul-ki =

South Korean singer and actress (born 1986)

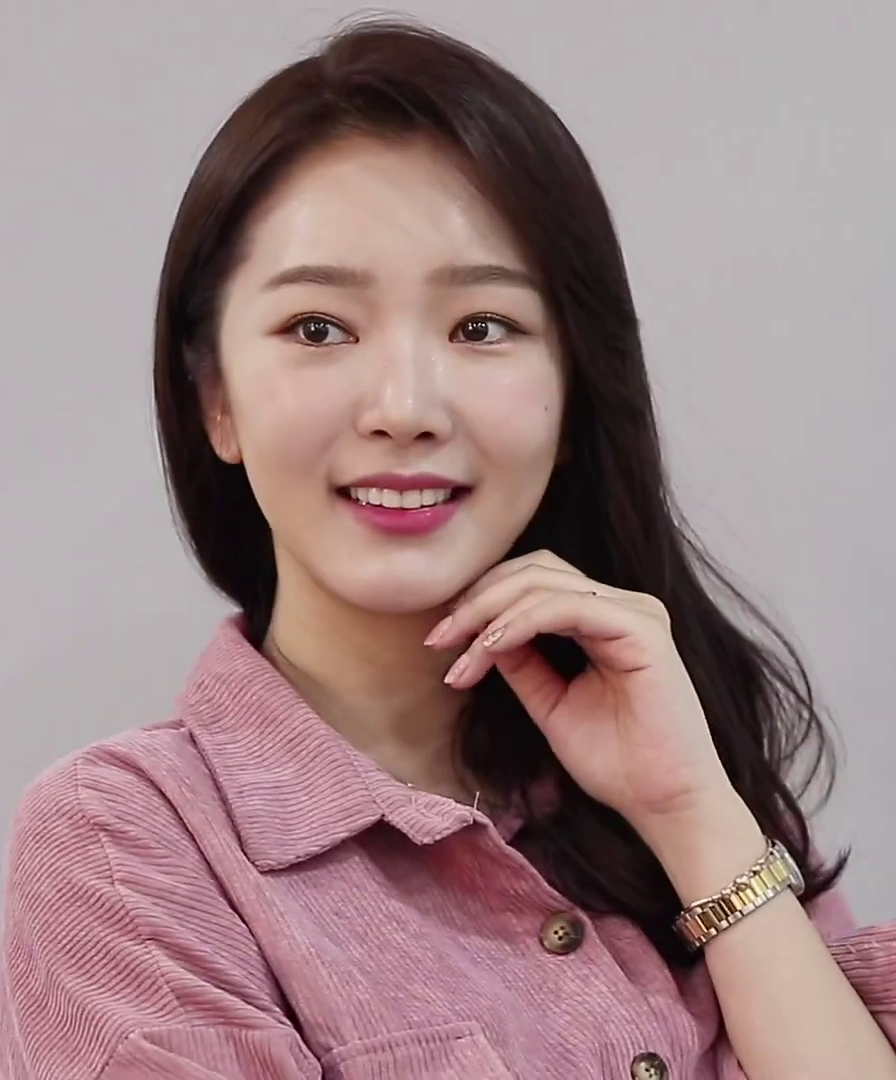
- Bae in November 2020
- Born: September 27, 1986 (age 40); South Korea
- Occupations: Singer; actress
- Years active: 2005–present
- Agent: SAYON Media
- Spouse: Shim Lee-seop (m. 2020)
- Children: 1
- Musical career
- Genre: Dance-pop
- Instruments: Vocals
- Formerly of: The Red

Korean name
- Hangul: 배슬기
- RR: Bae Seulgi
- MR: Pae Sŭlgi

Bae Seul-ki (Korean: 배슬기; born September 27, 1986) is a South Korean singer and actress. She made her entertainment debut as a member of The Red, but has since become a solo singer.

== Career ==
=== Debut ===
Bae Seul-ki studied Theater and Film at Sangmyong University, then made her entertainment debut in the fall of 2005 as part of the project group The 빨강 (The Red) with actresses Oh Seung-eun and Ju So-young, which allowed her to gain stage experience and fame before her solo debut. Appearing on many variety shows, she became an Internet sensation when she showed her 복고 (bokko meaning "old school") dance on SBS's Love Letter.

=== 2006 ===
After the group split in early 2006 (as it was a "project group," used for introducing new singers), the record company felt that Bae could handle being a solo singer. They quickly prepared a digital single, with a full album following in the fall of 2006. The first single from the album, "강한 여자" (Ganghan Yujah, meaning "Strong Woman"), had Carlos from the Korean rap group Uptown and featured Bae with many B-boys in a heavily choreographed breakdancing routine. However, this single was quickly abandoned after a few weeks in favor of "말괄량이" (Malgwalyangee, meaning "Tomboy" or "Sassy Girl"), a song with a cute, light feel. It was more in line with popular taste, as similar songs like "Cutie Honey" by Ahyoomee (from Sugar) and "Love Me Love Me" from Lee Ji-hye (formerly of S#arp) were doing well. In addition to promoting her single, she has also assisted Eru's performances of his second album comeback single, "까만 안경" (Ggaman Angkyung, "Black Glasses").

With the success of "Tomboy," her record company quickly released her second digital single in December 2006. Her title single "One by One" featured her in a snowy backdrop to suit the Christmas mood. The lyrics of this song were also written by her. After promoting this single on the various music programs, Bae sang a duet with Glass Box on a charity album called Mind Bridge.

=== 2007 ===
In May 2007, Bae made a guest appearance in the music video for Banana Girls' "Chocolate" alongside other stars such as Kan Mi-youn.

Returning with a new image after the success of "Strong Woman" and "Tomboy," Bae released her second album on October 8, 2007, titled Flying. Because of the popularity of her first album, she has come back with an entirely new image and worked with Korea's famous music producers to make this album.

The title track, "Seul-ki Say" was based on a vocal dance track. This is a departure from her previous sweet and cute image and was written to show off her singing skills. The music video for "What Is Love Like" was partly filmed in Beijing, China due to her large fanbase there.

On October 12, she performed her title track for the first time on KBS's Music Bank Comeback Special. With a more mature and sophisticated image, her performance slanted towards the "rock" side and surprised many of her fans. Soon after, her Comeback Special became number one on the search engine and this marked the start of her promotional activities.

=== Hosting and acting ===
She appeared in the variety shows Love Letter in 2005, and Catch Light in 2006. After ending the promotion of her album, Bae has moved on to hosting. In April 2007, she began hosting a music programme on KM TV called POP, which introduced popular foreign music to Korean fans. She also hosted MBC's Music Show with Brian Joo from Fly to the Sky, acting as a guest MC in place of Kim Hyun-joong from SS501. Bae starred in an advertisement for the MMORPG, Luna Online.

She was cast as the lead actress in the hip-hop drama Groove Party (also known as Hot Dance World), a China-Korea collaboration. When she arrived in Shanghai in mid-May 2007 for filming, more than 300 fans arrived at the airport to welcome her, and at the same time showering her with many gifts. Unfortunately, the project did not push through. After training for her role as an assassin in the international film Finale, she was later pulled out due to funding issues.

She then acted in the stage musicals Lunatic (2008) and On Air Live (2010).

In 2011, she had supporting roles in the MBC dramas The Greatest Love and Midnight Hospital, as well as the film Couples.

=== Endorsements ===
As of August 2007, Bae has become the spokesperson for Korea's Eyainteractive Company's MMORPG (online game) Luna Online. The reason she was chosen was because of her similarity to the character's liveliness and cuteness.

In 2014, Bae featured as a main dancer in the MV of the popular Chinese song, "Little Apple".

== Personal life ==
Bae has two younger siblings, a brother and a sister. She is a practicing Roman Catholic.

She married YouTuber Shim Lee-seop in 2020. On March 17, 2024, Bae announced that she was pregnant after four years of marriage. In a June 4 Instagram post, she revealed "Lee Seul" as the child's name. The couple welcomed their child, a son, on October 10, 2024.

== Discography ==
=== Studio albums ===
Title	Album details	Peak chart positions
Title	Album details	KOR
The 1st Volume	Released: September 29, 2006; Track listing: 1. One by One; 2. 강한 여자 (Strong Woman) feat. Carlos from Uptown; 3. 소금인형 (Salt Doll); 4. 말괄량이 (Tomboy) feat. Carlos from Uptown; 5. 꽃잎이 지면 (Petal Floor) [Narration]; 6. 꽃잎이 지면 (Petal Floor); 7. Sexy Boy; 8. Love Stuck; 9. A Good Day; 10. It's Groove feat. Crown J 11. 강한 여자 (Strong Woman) (Inst.); 12. Diary (Narration)	—
Flying	Released: October 12, 2007; Track listing: 1. Flying; 2. 다가와 (Come to Me); 3. 비가 오던 날 (A Rainy Day); 4. 슬기 Say (Seul-ki Say); 5. 왠지 모르게 (Somehow I Don't Know); 6. Right Now; 7. 사랑아 어떡한거니 (What Did You Do Love?); 8. Ride with me 9. 너 왜그래 (Why Are You Like That); 10. 이별과 가위는 서로 닮았다 (Separation and Scissors are Alike); 11. Crazy Party; 12. 다가와 (Come to Me) (Inst.)	36
"—" denotes releases that did not chart or were not released in that region.

=== Extended plays ===
Title	Album details	Peak chart positions
Title	Album details	KOR
Big Show	Released: April 9, 2009; Track listing: 1. Intro; 2. 지겨워 (Tiresome) feat. Ha Joo-yeon of Jewelry; 3. DJ feat. Maboos; 4. 내게로 와 5. 내 사람이 돼줘요 feat. Brian Joo of Fly to the Sky; 6. 지겨워 (Tiresome) (Inst.)	44

=== Singles ===
Title	Year	Album
"I Fell in Love" (난 사랑에 빠졌죠)	2006	One For Love single album
"Happy Christmas"	2006	Happy Christmas single album
"Desert Island" (무인도) with Kim Gyeong-Wook	2009	Bae Seul-ki and Namolla Family

=== Soundtrack appearances ===
Title	Year	Album
"Dream With Me" (꿈은 나에게)	2007	Yakitate!! Japan OST
"Somehow" (왠지)	2017	Still Loving You OST
"Everything" (전부)	2017	A Sea of Her Own OST

== Filmography ==
=== Television ===
- 2003: Thousand Years of Love (SBS)
- 2004: Full House (KBS2) (cameo, episode 1)
- 2004: Emperor of the Sea (KBS2)
- 2005: Rainbow Romance (MBC)
- 2005 to 2006: Banjun Drama (SBS)
  - "Unforgettable Love" (with DBSK)
  - "Suicide Rescue Team"
  - "A Very Special Story"
  - "The Third Guy"
  - "Taxi 1986"
  - "Junjin Goes to School"
- 2005: Love Letter (SBS)
- 2006: Catch Light (KM)
- 2006: Break
- 2009: Superstar Black City
- 2011: The Greatest Love (MBC)
- 2011: Midnight Hospital (MBC)
- 2012: Man from the Equator (KBS2)
- 2013: Unemployed Romance (E Channel)
- 2015: The Flatterer (YouTube)
- 2016: Still loving you
- 2017: The Idolmaster KR (Amazon Original Series, SBS)
- 2018: Risky Romance (MBC)
- 2021: Amor Fati (SBS)
- 2023: Battle for Happiness (special appearance, ENA)

=== Film ===
- 2011: Couples
- 2012: Weird Business (segment: "The Suicidal Assassin")
- 2013: Short! Short! Short! 2013 (segment: "The Body")
- 2013: Tough as Iron
- 2013: Door to the Night
- 2014: A Case of Bachelor Abduction
- 2014: School of Youth: The Corruption of Morals

== Musical theatre ==
- 2008: Lunatic
- 2010: On Air Live
