= Love Letter (game show) =

South Korean television show, 2004–2006

- Also known as: Real Romance Love Letter
- Hangul: 리얼 로망스 연애편지
- Hanja: 리얼 로망스 戀愛片紙
- RR: Rieol romangseu yeonaepyeonji
- MR: Riŏl romangsŭ yŏnaep'yŏnji
- Genre: Comedy; Romance; Game show
- Presented by: Kang Ho-dong
- Country of origin: South Korea
- Original language: Korean
- No. of seasons: 3
- No. of episodes: 154

Production
- Running time: 60 min

Original release
- Network: SBS
- Release: 16 October 2004 – 28 October 2006

Related
- Real Situation Saturday

Real Romance Love Letter (Korean: 리얼 로망스 연애편지) is a South Korean television game show broadcast from 16 October 2004 to 28 October 2006 for three seasons. It was part of the line-up of programme for Real Situation Saturday (실제상황! 토요일) that was broadcast from 8 November 2003 to 5 January 2007 on SBS.

The MC was Kang Ho Dong and it featured male and female contestants competing for "each other" in romance games. For example, guests have to dance in order to impress the person they are after. Contestants were artists, actors, models, comedians, and MCs of the South Korean entertainment industry.

== Format ==
Season 1: Each recording is divided and broadcast as two episodes in consecutive weeks. During the show various games are played. At the end of part 1 the female guest chooses two contestants to go on dates with, and the rest goes into training camp. At the end of part 2 the female guest chooses her "Perfect Man" and declared as the winner, who gets a "Perfect Man" pin and a kiss on the cheek from the guest.

== Contestants ==
Past contestants includes:

- Shinhwa members: Eric Mun, Lee Min-woo, Kim Dong-wan, Shin Hye-sung, Jun Jin, Andy
- Kim Jong-kook
- Shin Jung-hwan
- NRG members: Chun Myung-hoon, Lee Sungjin
- Kim Jong-min
- BUZZ members: Min Kyung-hoon, Son Sunghee, Kim Yejun
- Fly To The Sky members : Brian, Hwanhee
- Super Junior members: Choi Siwon, Han Geng, Kim Heechul, Lee Donghae, Lee Sungmin, Kim Kibum
- SS501 members
- Han Hyo-joo
- Chae Yeon
- Jeon Hye-bin
- Hwangbo
- Bae Seul-ki
- Jang Woo-hyuk
- Yoo Ri
- Tablo
- Hwang Jung-eum
- Lee Ahyumi
- Solbi
- Kang Ho-dong
- Ha Ji-won

== Episodes ==
SEASON 1

Season / Episode	Broadcast Date	Male Guests	Female Guest(s)	Winner
S01E01-02	2004.10.16 – 10.23	Shinhwa	Kim Jong Eun	Shin Hyesung
		Shin Junghwan, Chun Myunghoon		
S01E03-04	2004.11.06 – 11.13	Shinhwa	Han Ga In	advance?
		Shin Junghwan, Chun Myunghoon		
S01E05-06	2004.11.20 – 11.27	Shinhwa	Kim Minjung	Shin Hyesung
		Shin Junghwan, Chun Myunghoon		
S01E07-08	2004.12.04 – 12.11	Shinhwa	Ha Ji-Won	Eric
		Shin Junghwan, Chun Myunghoon		
S01E09-10	2004.12.18 – 12.25	Shinhwa	Han Eun Jung	Kim Dongwan
		Shin Junghwan, Chun Myunghoon		
S01E11	2005.01.01	SPECIAL		
S01E12-13	2005.01.08 – 01.15	Shinhwa	Jang Shin Young	Andy
		Shin Junghwan, Chun Myunghoon, Kim Jongmin		
S01E14-15	2005.01.22 – 01.29	Shinhwa	Han Ji Hye	Minwoo
		Shin Junghwan, Chun Myunghoon, Kim Jongmin		
S01E16-17	2005.02.05 – 02.12	Lee Hwijae, Hong Gyungmin, Fly To The Sky, Ohn Juhwan	Yoo Min	Kim Jongmin
		Shin Junghwan, Chun Myunghoon, Kim Jongmin		
S01E18-19	2005.02.19 – 02.26	Andy, Brian, Lee Seungki, Woo Jungtae, Ohn Juhwan, Lee Jung, Baek-ga	Lee Da Hae	Brian
		Shin Junghwan, Chun Myunghoon, Kim Jongmin		
S01E20-21	2005.03.05 – 03.12	Eun Jiwon, Andy, Yoon Taek, Hooni-hoon, Tei, Choi Hyunho, Ohn Juhwan	Kim Sun Ah	Shin Junghwan
		Shin Junghwan, Chun Myunghoon, Kim Jongmin		
S01E22-23	2005.03.19 – 03.26	Andy, Tim, Tei, Min Kyunghoon, Taek Yoon, Hoon Ni-hoon	Han Chae Young	Huni Hoon
		Shin Junghwan, Chun Myunghoon		
S01E24-25	2005.04.02 – 04.09	Andy, Tim, Baek Kiseong, Min Kyunghoon, HaHa, Yoon Taek, Chae Geon	Son Tae Young	team
		Shin Junghwan, Chun Myunghoon		
S01E26	2005.04.16	S1 SPECIAL SUMMARY		

SEASON 2

Season / Episode	Broadcast Date	Male Guests	Female Guest(s)	Winning Couple(s)

S02E01-02	2005.04.23 – 04.30	Cho Sungmo, Junjin, Andy, Tim, Alex	So Soojin, Hong Soohyun, Park Jung Ah	Cho Sungmo & Park Jung Ah					
		Shin Junghwan, Chun Myunghoon	Lee Jihyun, Binwoo, Jang Youngran, Lee Young Ah						
S02E03-04	2005.05.07 – 05.14	Sung Shi Kyung, Junjin, Andy, Tim, Min Kyunghoon	Han Eun Jung, Jeon Hyebin, Binwoo, Hyun Yung	Sung Shi Kyung & Han Eun Jung					
		Shin Junghwan, Chun Myunghoon	Hong Soo Ah, Jang Youngran, Gong Hyunjoo						
S02E05-06	2005.05.21 – 05.28	Junjin, Andy, Tei, Kyung Hoon Min, Son Sunghee	Hwang Inyoung, Jeon Hyebin, Binwoo	CMH & Hwang In Young	Min Kyunghoon & Chae Yeon				
		Shin Junghwan, Chun Myunghoon	Chae Yeon, Jang Youngran, Choi Jahye, Shim Eunjin						
S02E07-08	2005.06.04 – 06.11	Kim Junghoon, Junjin, Andy, Tim, Min Kunghoon	Ok Juhyun, Jeon Hyebin, Kim Binwoo,	Min Kyunghoon & Kim Binwoo	Team & Ok Juhyun	Junjin & Jeon Hyebin	Kim Junghoon & Lee Young Ah		
		Shin Junghwan, Chun Myunghoon	Jang Youngran, Seo In Young, Hong Soo Ah, Lee Young Ah						
S02E09-10	2005.06.18 – 06.25	Junjin, Andy, Tei, HaHa, Lee Sangwoo, Ha Seokjin	Park Jung Ah, Lee Jihyun, Jang Youngran	Lee Sangwoo & Park Jung Ah	Junjin & Lee Sookyung	Ha Seokjin & Binwoo	CMH & Choi Jiyeon	Tim & Choi Jahye	
		Shin Junghwan, Chun Myunghoon	Binwoo, Lee Soo Kyung, Choi Jiyeon, Choi Jahye						
S02E11-12	2005.07.02 – 07.09	Sung Shi Kyung, Junjin, Andy, Tim, MC Mong	Yang Mira, Binwoo, Jang Youngran	Junjin & Lee Soo Kyung	Andy & Bae Sunghee	Sung Shi Kyung & Binwoo	Tim & Kim Mira		
		Shin Junghwan, Chun Myunghoon	Lee Jihyun, Lee Soo Kyung, Bae Sunghee, Chae Yeon						
S02E13-14	2005.07.16 – 07.23	Shin Hyesung, Junjin, Andy, Tim, MC Mong	Binwoo, Jang Youngran, Kang Junghwa	Shin Hyesung & Lee Young Ah	Junjin & Lee Soo Kyung	Andy & Chu Soyoung	MC Mong & Choi Jiyeon		
		Shin Junghwan, Chun Myunghoon	Chu Soyoung, Choi Jiyeon, Lee Soo Kyung, Lee Young Ah						
S02E15-16	2005.07.30 – 08.06	Min Kyunghoon, Andy, Tim, Ha Seokjin, Kim Hyunjoong (SS501),	Jeon Hyebin, Seo Jiyoung, Sagan, Chu Soyoung	Kim Hyunjoong & Jeon Hyebin	Min Kyunghoon & Seo Jiyoung	Andy & Chu Soyoung	CMH & Sagan	Ha Seokjin & Lee Jihyun	
		Shin Junghwan, Chun Myunghoon	Jang Youngran, Lee Jihyun, Shin Minhee						
S02E17-18	2005.08.13 – 08.20	Shin Hyesung, Tim, Ha Seokjin, Kim Jiseok, Song Hobum	Jeon Hyebin, Jang Youngran, Seo Jiyoung	Shin Hyesung & Hong Soo Ah	Kim Jiseok & Dana	Ha Seokjin & Jung Yumi	Tim & Seo Jiyoung		
		Shin Junghwan, Chun Myunghoon	Hong Soo Ah, Chu Soyoung, Dana (CSJH), Jung Yumi						
S02E19-20	2005.08.27 – 09.03	Goo Junyoub (DJ Koo), Min Kyunghoon, Ha Seokjin, HaHa, Kim Ye Jun	Jeon Hyebin, Jang Youngran, Binwoo						
		Shin Junghwan, Chun Myunghoon	Seo Jiyoung, Seo In Young, Sun Woosun, Hwaran	CMH & Hwaran	Ha Seokjin & Jeon Hyebin	HaHa & Sun Woosun	Goo Junyoub & Seo In Young		
S02E21-23*	2005.09.10 – 09.24	Kim Jongkook, Yunho & Mickey (DBSK), Kim Jisuk, Song Hobum	Jeon Hyebin, Jang Youngran, Hwangbo	Kim Jongkook & Jeon Hyebin	Kim Seokjin & Sang Mirina	Mickey & Hwangbo			
*22 = Chuseok special Highlight		Shin Junghwan, Chun Myunghoon	Lee Jihye, Lim Jung Eun, Sang Mirina, Gilgun						
S02E24-25	2005.10.01 – 10.08	Minwoo, Sung Shi Kyung, MC Mong, Kim Hyunjoong (SS501), Song Hobum	Jeon Hyebin, Jang Youngran, Lee Jihye, Lim Jung Eun						
		Shin Junghwan, Chun Myunghoon	Seo Younghee, Lee Chae, Ryu Dayoung						
S02E26-27	2005.10.15 – 10.22	Jang Woo Hyuk, Goo Junyoub (DJ Koo), Yunho, Kim Ji Seok, No Yumi	Jeon Hyebin, Jang Youngran, Soojin, Oh Seung Eun	Jang Woo Hyuk & Seo Jiyoung	Kim Ji Seok & Soojin	Goo Junyoub & Han Hyo Joo	Yunho & Chu Soyoung		
		Shin Junghwan, Chun Myunghoon	Chu Soyoung, Han Hyo Joo						
S02E28-29	2005.10.29 – 11.05	Lee Minwoo, Lee Sungjin, Kim Jungnam, Kim Hyunjoong (SS501), Lee Taesung	Jeon Hyebin, Jang Youngran, Oh Seungeun	Kim Hyunjoong & Oh Seungeun	Lee Taesung & Hwang Jungeum	Lee Minwoo & Jeon Hyebin	Kim Jongmin & Bae Seul Gi	Lee Sungjin & Jang Youngran	CMH & Lee Chae
		Shin Junghwan, Chun Myunghoon, Kim Jongmin	Chu Soyoung, Bae Seul Gi, Hwang Jungeum, Lee Chae	Goo Junyoub & Han Hyo Joo	Brian & Jang Youngran	Hwanee & Jeon Hyebin	Wonwoo & Shim Eunjin	Lee Taesung & Bae Seul Gi	
S02E30-31	2005.11.12 – 11.19	Fly To The Sky, Goo Junyoub (DJ Koo), Lee Taesung, Wonwoo	Chae Yeon, Jeon Hyebin, Jang Youngran, Shim Eunjin						
		Shin Junghwan, Chun Myunghoon	Oh Seungeun, Bae Seul Gi, Han Hyo joo						
S02E32-33	2005.11.26 – 12.03	Jang Woo Hyuk, Yunho & Mickey (DBSK), Donghae (SuJu), Boom	Jeon Hyebin, Seo Jiyoung, Lee Yunmi	Jang Woohyuk & Seo Jiyoung	Jeon Hyebin & Yunho	Kim Jongmin & Bae Seul Gi	Mickey & Hwang Jungeum		
		Chun Myunghoon, Kim Jongmin	Bae Seul Gi, Hwang Jungeum, Dan Ji, Song Jaeyoon						
S02E34-35	2005.12.10 – 12.17	Jang Woo Hyuk, Lee Minwoo, Sung Shi Kyung, Tablo (EPIC HIGH), Boom	Chae Yeon, Jeon Hyebin, Lee Yunm	Lee Minwoo & Lee Yunmi	Jang Woo Hyuk & Jeon Hyebin	Tablo & Han Hyo Joo	Sung Shi Kyung & Benny		
		Chun Myunghoon, Kim Jongmin	Han Hyo Joo, Hwang Jungeum, Bae Seul Gi, Benny						
S02E36-37	2005.12.24 – 12.31	Jang Woo Hyuk, Tei, Kim Heechul (SuJu), Kim Jiseok, Wang Bae	Jeon Hyebin, Shim Eunjin, Park Jung Ah	KJM & Soojin	Tei & Harin	Heechul & Eunjin	Jang Woo Hyuk & Park Jung Ah	Kim Jiseok & Hong Soo Ah	
		Chun Myunghoon, Kim Jongmin	Hong Soo Ah, Bae Seul Gi, Soojin, Harin						
S02E38-39	2006.01.07 – 01.14	Kim Jongkook, MC Mong, Lee Sungjin, Kim Jiseok, Kim Hyungjoon, Park Jung Min	Chae Yeon, Jeon Hyebin, Seo Jiyoung, Shim Eunjin	MC Mong & Seo Jiyoung	Park Jungmin & Bae Seul Gi	Lee Sungjin & Hwang Jungeum	Kim Jiseok & Shim Eunjin		
		Chun Myunghoon, Kim Jongmin	Binwoo, Seo In Young, Bae Seul Gi, Hwang Jungeum						
S02E40-42	2006.01.21 – 02.04	Jang Woo Hyuk, Goo Junyoub (DJ Koo), Yoon Jungsoo, Kim Taehyun, Kim Jiseok, Ryan	Jeon Hyebin, Binwoo, Seo Younghee, Hwang Jungeum	Ryan & Bae Seul Gi	CMH & Lee Yewon	Jang Woo Hyuk & Jeon Hyebiin	Kim Jiseok & Hwang Jungeum	KJM & Seo Younghee	Goo Junyoub & Binwoo
(Phuket, Thailand Winter Special)		Chun Myunghoon, Kim Jongmin	Kang Junghwa, Bae Seul Gi, Lee Yewon, Jung Shia						
S02E43-44	2006.02.11 – 02.18	Minwoo, Fly To The Sky, Kim Jiseok, Choi Shi Won (SuJu), Choi Kwon	Chae Yeon, Shim Eunjin, Oh Seungeun						
		Chun Myunghoon, Kim Jongmin	Bae Seul Gi, Jo Jung Rin, Sungeun, Lee Yewon, Cha Hyunjung	KJM & Cha Hyunjung	Brian & Chae Yeon	Hwanee & Shim Eunjin	Kim Jiseok & Jo Jung Rin	Minwoo & Lee Yewon	Choi Shi Won & Bae Seul Gi
S02E45-46	2006.02.25 – 03.04	Brian, Tablo (EPIC HIGH), Tei, Kim Heechul (SuJu)	Bada (SES), Chae Yeon, Bae Seul Gi, Hwang Jungeum	Kim Jiseok & Hwang Jungeum	Tablo & Bada	Brian & Bae Seul Gi	Tei & Soojin		
		Kim Jiseok, Woosoo, Kim Jong Min	Soojin, Cha Hyunjung, Hwang Bora, Kwon Minhee						
S02E47-48	2006.03.11 – 03.18	Fly To The Sky, Choi Shi Won (SuJu), Kim Taehyun, Ryan, Jobin	Shim Eunjin, Soojin, Bae Seul Gi, Jo Jung Rin, Sungeun	Brian & Soojin	Hwanee & Lee Eonjung	Ryan & Hwang Bora	Kim Taehyun & Shim Eunjin	Choi Shiwon & Bae Seul Gi	KJM & Sungeun
		Chun Myunghoon, Kim Jongmin	Secretary Yoon, Lee Eonjung, Kwak Jimin, Hwang Bora						
S02E49-50	2006.03.25 – 04.01	Brian, Lee Seungki, Choi Shi Won & Kim Kibum (SuJu), Jo Gyuhung, Oh Changhoon	Bada (SES), Chae Yeon, Hwang Jungeum, Bae Seul Gi	CMH & Bada	KJM & Hwang Jungeum	Brian & Bae Seul Gi	Oh Changhoon & Hwang Bora	Chae Yeon & Lee Seungki	Soojin & Kim Kibum
		Chun Myunghoon, Kim Jongmin	Jo Jung Rin, Hwang Bora, Kwak Jimin						
S02E51-52	2006.04.08 – 04.15	Yoon Jungsu, Choi Shiwon (SuJu), Kim Taehyun, Jo Gyehyung, Seo Jaekyung, Lee Jaeyoon	Bada, Hwang Jungeum, Soojin, Bae Seul Gi, Hwang Bora						
		Chun Myunghoon, Kim Jongmin	Min Seohyun, Kim Soohyun, Yoon Soyoung						
S02E53-54	2006.04.22 – 04.29	Yoon Jungsu, Tim, Tei, Choi Sungjun, Kim Kyungrok, Sungmin	Bada (SES), Chae Yeon, Soojin, Ayumi (Sugar), Jo Jung Rin						
		Chun Myunghoon, Kim Jongmin	Bae Seul Gi, Yee Seolah, Choi Na						
S02E55-57	2006.05.06 – 05.20	Yoon Jungsu, Fly To The Sky, Tim, Choi Sungjun, Jo Ghehyung	Bada (SES), Park Jung Ah, Hwang Jungeum, Soojin						
BALI SPECIAL		Chun Myunghoon, Kim Jongmin	Oh Jooeun, Jo Minah, Yoo In Young, Kim Soohyun						

SEASON 3

Season / Episode	Broadcast Date	Male Guests	Female Guest(s)	Winning Couple(s)

S03E01-02	2006.05.27 – 06.03	Tony Ahn, Choi Shiwon & Donghae (SuJu), Tim, Jo Gyesung, Ryan, Yoon Jungsu	Park Jung Ah, Yuri, Soojin, Hwang Jungeum
		Shin Junghwan, Kim Jongmin	Bada, Maybee
S03E03-04	2006.06.10 – 06.17	Andy, Brian, Moon Ji Yoon, Tim, Kim Kyungrok, Leejung, Yoon Jungsu, Lee Seungki	Maybee, Hwayobi, Yuri, Nam Gyuri (SeeYa)
		Shin Junghwan, Kim Jongmin	Ayumi, Park Jung Ah
S03E05-06	2006.06.24 – 07.01	Choi Shiwon & Kim Heechul (SuJu), Ha Seokjin, Phillip Choi, Hankyung, Ryan, Yoon Jungsu, Ryan	Kang Junghwa, Yuri, Hwang Jungeum, Ayumi
		Shin Junghwan, Kim Jongmin	Jo Jung Rin, Yook Hyeseung
S03E07-08	2006.07.08 – 07.15	Brian, Tim, Im Juhwan, Lee Sangwon, Lee Jung, Now, Yoosoo, Ryan	Chae Yeon, Ayumi, Park Heebon
		Shin Junghwan, Kim Jongmin	Jung Juri, Lee Boram
S03E09-10	2006.07.22 – 07.29	Brian, Tim, Im Juhwan, Ha Dong Kyun, Lee Jung, Yoon Jungsu, Kim Jaewoo, Kim Jaeseung	Ayumi, Yuri, Choi Hana, Gilgun
		Shin Junghwan, Kim Jongmin	Shin Joo Ah, Kim Sae Rom
S03E11-13	2006.08.05 – 08.19	Lee Jongsu, Lee Sangwon, Lee Jung, Tim, Hankyung (SuJu), Yoon Jungsu, Lee Kyun, Lee Yongju	Ayumi, Yuri, Seo Younghee, Im Jungeun
THAILAND SPECIAL		Shin Junghwan, Kim Jongmin	Kim Yunjoo, Jung Dahae
S03E14-15	2006.08.26 – 09.02	Brian, Typhoon, Ha Dong Gyun, Kim Jiseok, Kim Inseok, Crown J	Yuri, Nam Gyuri (SeeYa), Hwang Bo
		Shin Junghwan, Chun Myunghoon, Kim Jongmin	Solbi, Lee Jihye, Kim Haryung
S03E16-17	2006.09.09 – 09.16	Brian, Hankyung & Choi Shi Won (SuJu), Lee Sangwon, Yoon Jungsu, Lee Jung	Ayumi, Hyun Young, Hwang Jungeum, Yuri, Solbi
		Shin Junghwan, Chun Myunghoon, Kim Jongmin	
S03E18-19	2006.09.23 – 09.30	Brian, Jang Woo Hyuk, Choi Shiwon & Kim Kibum (SuJu), Yoon Jungsu, Ham Jaehee, Jung Jae Wook	Hwang Jihyun, Bae Seul Gi, Sungeun, Ayumi, Yuri, Chae Rina
		Shin Junghwan, Chun Myunghoon, Kim Jongmin	
S03E20	2006.10.27	Chuseok Special - Bungee Highlights from S2 & S3	
S03E21-22	2006.10.14 – 10.21	Brian, Lee Seungki, Kim Jiseok, Yoon Jihoo, Xmas (The TRAX), Neo (Paran), Yoon Jungsu	Park Jung Ah, Bae Seul Gi, Kan Mi Youn
		Shin Junghwan, Chun Myunghoon, Kim Jongmin	Sungeun, Maybee, Lee Soojung
S03E23	2006.10.28	BEST OF / HIGHLIGHTS	
		LAST EPISODE	
