= Kim Ho-young (actor) =

South Korean actor (born 1983)

- 김호영
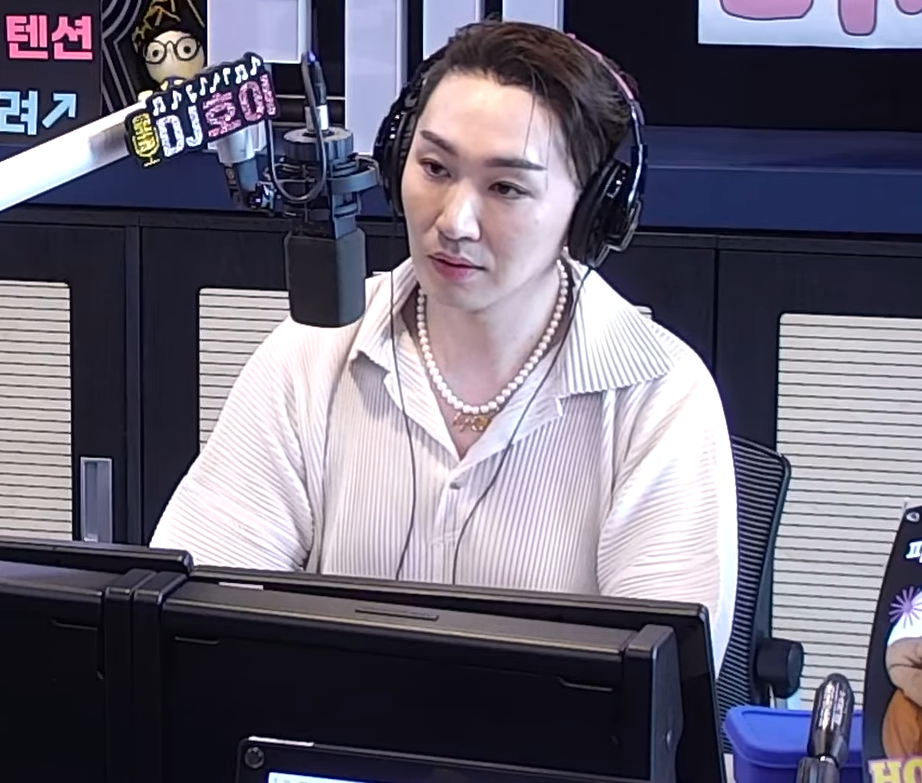
- Kim in 2024
- Born: February 19, 1983 (age 43); South Korea
- Education: Dongguk University (BA); Dankook University (MA)
- Occupations: Actor; musical actor; singer
- Years active: 2014–present
- Agent: PLK Good Friends

Korean name
- Hangul: 김호영
- RR: Gim Hoyeong
- MR: Kim Hoyŏng

Kim Ho-young (Korean: 김호영; born February 19, 1983) is a South Korean actor and television entertainer. He debuted in the musical Rent in 2002 and has since appeared in musicals such as Aida, Gambler, Kingdom of the Winds, Hairspray, Zanna, Don't!, Queen Seondeok, and The Two Gentlemen of Verona, and in the plays Yi, Agarwood, and Piaf. He has gained recognition for his feminine roles, becoming known as a "specialized cross-dressing actor" for his appearances as characters such as the gay character Angel in Rent, a crossdressing showgirl named Jiji in Gambler, and "the king's man" Gong-gil in Yi.

== Early life and education ==
Kim Ho-young was born in Seoul. When he was young, he saw the crown prince wearing a red robe in a historical drama and wanted to be an actor. His first play was in a high school drama class and he entered a national theater competition. Since his school was an all-boys high school, he played the role of a girl, and from then on, he often played girls' roles.

Kim enrolled to of the Department of Theater and Film at Dongguk University. He made his debut as Angel in Rent when he was in his second year of college. He received favorable reviews for his performance as a gay angel in Rent.

"I made my debut as Angel in Rent when I was in my second year of college. I started out as a cross-dressing man, and while I mainly played feminine roles, there were some concerns around me about being fixed with one image, but I am competitive and I am the only one who can do it. "I think it's a differentiation."

Kim played the role of Mereb in the musical Aida performed with Ock Joo-hyun. Kim also played the role of Gong-gil in the play Lee and gave a passionate performance. Kim played an active part in famous musicals such as The Hunchback of Notre Dame and The Sound of Music.

In 2007, Kim acted as teen Yeon Ho-gae in MBC's special drama The Legend.

In 2011, Kim with Seoul National University of Arts (Chairman Kim Min-seong) hold a special lecture at the SAC Art Center. In this special lecture, in which about 200 students from the Department of Musical, Acting, and Performing Arts were participating, on the topic of "Attitude of a Musical Actor".

Kim decided to enlist in the military late in November 20, 2012 at the age of 30. The difficulties he felt during his military service were due to the generation gap with his classmates rather than an environment dominated by strict hierarchy and discipline.

After his discharge from the military, Kim began his career as an MC on the women-only show Mr. Show. Kim later announced her successful return with the musical Priscilla.

In 2015, Kim who has been active on large stages, took on the challenge of appearing on the Daehakro small theater stage as Professor V in the musical Mama, Don't Cry. Mama, Don't Cry is a work that tells the story of Professor V, a genius physicist who travels through time, and meets Count Dracula, a vampire who lives an immortal life. It is a two-person play featuring addictive rock numbers that have a large fan base.

In 2016, known for his performances as cross-dressing men, surprised everyone by choosing to play the role of Charlie, an ordinary man, in the musical Kinky Boots. This marked a new challenge for him as he aimed to overcome the prejudice that he was only good at flashy roles and showcase his versatility as an actor.

In 2022, Kim reprised the role of Charlie again after 4 years. The musical performed at the Chungmu Arts Center Grand Theater until October 23.

== Filmography ==
=== Film ===
Year	Title		Role	Ref.
Year	English	Korean	Role	Ref.
2021	Mission: Possible	미션 파서블	fortune teller	

=== Television series ===
Year	Title		Role	Notes	Ref.
Year	English	Korean	Role	Notes	Ref.
2000	Love is for Everyone	사랑은 아무나 하나	Managing Director Kim		
2007	The Legend	태왕사신기	Youn Ho-gae		
2011	The Musical	더 뮤지컬	Kim Ho-young		
2017	Voice	보이스	Yang Ho-sik	Special appearance (episode 9, 10)	
2018	Come and Hug Me	이리와 안아줘	Kim Ho-young		
2019	Pegasus Market	쌉니다 천리마마트	Jo Min-dal		
2022	Behind Every Star	연예인 매니저로 살아남기	Kim Ho-young	Special appearance	

=== Television shows ===
Year	Title	Korean	Role	Notes	Ref.
2006	Ok Joo-hyun's Like Virgin Season 1	옥주현의 라이크 어 버진 시즌 1	Guest		
2011	Dream maker	드림 메이커			
2017	Singing Battle	노래싸움 - 승부	Contestant		
2017	King of Mask Singer	미스터리 음악쇼 복면가왕	Contestant		
2017	Radio Star	황금어장 라디오스타	Guest		
2018	Life Bar	인생술집	Guest		
2018	Real Man 300	진짜 사나이 300	Cast Member		
2019	Radio Star	황금어장 라디오스타	Guest		
2019	Women's Plus 3	여자플러스 3	MC		
2020	South Korean Foreigners	대한외국인	Guest		
2021	Radio Star	황금어장 라디오스타	Guest		
2022	Ilta Instructor	일타강사	MC		
2022	Let's Eat Go	먹자GO	Cast Member		
2022	Burning Trotman	불타는 트롯맨	Judge		
2023	You're so Nice	당신 참 좋다	Cast Member	With Yang Hee-eun, Park Seong-mi, and Park Mi-seon	
2023	Battle Trip Season 2	배틀트립 시즌2	Contestant	With Ryu Seung-soo	
2023	Meet at the Meat	고기서 만나	Cast Member	With Kang Ho-dong	
2023	Strong heart league	강심장 리그	Cast Member		
2023	Radio Star — Golden Anniversary	황금어장 라디오스타	Guest		
2023	New song came out	신곡떴다	Cast Member		
2024	Over-immersed life history	과몰입 인생사	Guest		

=== Web shows ===
Year	Korean title	Role	Notes	Ref.
Greed Shopping Basket	스튜디오 수제 탐욕의 장바구니	Host	With Poong-ja; Studio Handmade YouTube Channel	

== Stage ==
=== Musical ===
Theater play performances of Kim
Year	Title		Role	Venue	Date	Ref.
Year	English	Korean	Role	Venue	Date	Ref.
2002	Rent	렌트	Angel			
2002	The Sound of Music	사운드 오브 뮤직	Ensemble	Seoul Arts Center Opera House	July 29 to August 11	
2002–2003	Rent	렌트	Angel	CJ Towol Theater, Seoul Arts Center	December 6 January 5	
2003–2004	Urinetown	유린타운	Mr. McQueen	Woorim Cheongdam Theater	October 3 to January 4	
2004	Rent	렌트	Angel	Dusan Art Center Yeongang Hall	July 2 to October 31	
2004	The Hunchback of Notre Dame	노틀담의 꼽추	Antoine	National Theatre Haeoreum Theatre	December 24 to January 23	
2005	Gambler	겜블러	Jiji	Daegu Opera House	April 14 to 17	
2005–2006	Aida	아이다	Mereb	LG Arts Center	August 23–April 20	
2007	Rent	렌트	Angel	Daehakro TOM Hall 1	January 7 to March 18	
2007	Land of Wind	바람의 나라	Ho-dong	CJ Towol Theater, Seoul Arts Center	May 5 to 25	
2007–2008	Hairspray	헤어스프레이	Link Larkin	Chungmu Art Center Grand Theater	November 11 to March 1	
2008	Gambler	겜블러	Jiji	LG Art Center	July 10 to August 3	
2009	Jana, Dont	자나, 돈트	Jana	Sejong Center for the Performing Arts' M Theater	February 7 to March 31	
2009	Piaf	피아프	Theo Sarapo	Seoul Arts Centre CJ Towol Theatre	November 5 to 16	
2009–2010	New musical quiz show	New musical 퀴즈쇼		Seoul Arts Centre CJ Towol Theatre	December 6 to January 2	
2010	Queen Seondeok	선덕여왕	Kim Chunchu	Seondeok Seoul Olympic Park Woori Financial Art Hall	January 5 to 31	
2010	Two Gentlemen of Verona	베로나의 두 신사	Valentine	Sejong Center for the Performing Arts M Theater	July 17 to August 28	
2010–2011	Aida	아이다	Mereb	child Seongnam Art Center Opera House	December 14 to March 27	
2012	Mozart Opera Rock	모차르트 오페라 락	Wolfgang Amadeus Mozart	Daegu Keimyung Art Center Seongnam Art Center Opera House	February 14 to March 11	
2012	Mozart Opera Rock	모차르트 오페라 락	Wolfgang Amadeus Mozart	Seongnam Art Center	March 30 to April 29	
2012	La Cage	라카지	Jacob	LG Art Center	July 4 to September 4	
2012	Ssanghwabyeolgok	쌍화별곡	Uisang	Daegu Cheonma Art Center Grand Hall Daegu	October 20–21	
2013	Promise	프라미스	Myungsu	National Theatre Haeoreum Theatre	February 15 to March 2	
2013	Promise	프라미스	Myungsu	Daegu Gyemyeong Art Centre	March 21 to 24	
2014	Priscilla	프리실라	Adam	LG Art Centre	July 3 to September 28	
2014–2015	La Cage	라카지	Jacob	LG Art Centre	December 9 to March 8	
2015	Mama Don't Cry	마마 돈 크라이	Professor V	Plus Theatre (ex. Culture Space N.U.)	March 10 to May 31	
2015	Taehwa River	태화강	Soebulkan	Suseong Artpia Yongji Hall in Daegu	July 3	
2015	Man of La Mancha	맨 오브 라만차	Sancho	D-Cube Art Centre	July 30 to November 1	
2016	Mama Don't Cry	마마 돈 크라이	Professor V	Uniplex 2	April 27 to August 28	
2016	Kinky Boots	킹키부츠	Charlie	Blue Square Interpark Hall	September 2 to November 13	
2017	Kkoppai, Ideal	꾿빠이 이상	Ideal	CKL Stage	September 21 to 30	
2018	Kinky Boots	킹키부츠	Charlie	Blue Square Interpark Hall	January 31 to April 1	
2018	Man of La Mancha	맨 오브 라만차	Sancho	Blue Square Interpark Hall	April 12 to June 3	
2018	Gwanghwamun Love Song	광화문 연가	Moonlight	Sindorim D Cube Art Centre	November 2 to January 20, 2019	
2020	Kkoppai, Ideal	꾿빠이 이상	Ideal	Seoul Arts Center CJ Towol Theater	December 14, 2020	
2021	Gwanghwamun Love Song	광화문 연가	Moonlight	Opera Theater	July 16 to September 5	
2022	Kinky Boots	킹키부츠	Charlie	Chungmu Arts Center Grand Theater	July 20 to October 23	
2022	Kinky Boots	킹키부츠	Charlie	Gyemyung Art Centre	November 4 to 13	
2022	Kinky Boots	킹키부츠	Charlie	Seongnam Arts Center Opera House	November 19 to 20	
2022	Kinky Boots	킹키부츠	Charlie	GS Caltex Yeulmaru Grand Theater	December 3 to 4	
2022	Kinky Boots	킹키부츠	Charlie	Yonginpo Art Hall	December 10 to 11	
2022	Kinky Boots	킹키부츠	Charlie	Goyang Aram Nuri Aram Theatre	December 17 to 18	
2022	Kinky Boots	킹키부츠	Charlie	Icheon Art Hall Grand Performance Hall	December 26 to 27	
2022–2023	Kinky Boots	킹키부츠	Charlie	Dream Theater Busan	December 24 to January 1	
2023–2024	Rent	렌트	Angel	COEX Shinhan Art Atrium	November 11 to February 25	

=== Theater ===
Theater play performances of Kim
Year	Title		Role	Venue	Date	Ref.
Year	English	Korean	Role	Venue	Date	Ref.
2006	Lee	이(爾)	Gong-gil	LG Arts Center	June 29 to July 14	
2008	Agarwood	침향 (沈香)		Arko Arts Theatre Grand Theatre	June 11–29	
2010	Lee	이(爾)	Gong-gil	Seoul Arts Center's Towol Theater	February 27 to March 21, 2010	
2011	2011 Seoul International Performing Arts Festival - Make-up	2011 서울국제공연예술제 - 화장	Tomisaburo	Daehak-ro Arts Theatre Grand Theatre	October 23 to 24	
2012–2013	The Vagina Monologues	버자이너 모놀로그		Chungmu Art Hall Blue Theater	October 26 to January 6	
2015–2016	Kiss of the Spider Woman	거미여인의 키스	Molina	Sinyeon Art Hall (A Art Hall)	November 7, 2015, to January 31, 2016	
2016–2017	Romeo and Juliet	로미오와 줄리엣	Mercutio	National Theater Daloreum Theater	December 9–January 13	
2017	Romeo and Juliet	로미오와 줄리엣	Mercutio	Gunpo Culture and Arts Center Suri Hall (Grand Performance Hall)	January 21–22	
2017	Romeo and Juliet	로미오와 줄리엣	Mercutio	Woosong Arts Center Daejeon	February 4–5	
2017	Romeo and Juliet	로미오와 줄리엣	Mercutio	Suseong Artpia Paper Hall Daegu	February 23–24	
2017	Romeo and Juliet	로미오와 줄리엣	Mercutio	Andong Culture and Arts Center Woongbu Hall	February 25–26	
2017	Special Liar	스페셜 라이어	Bobby Franklin	Dongsung Art Center Dongsung Hall	May 23 to July 30, 2017	
2017–2018	Kiss of the Spider Woman	거미여인의 키스	Molina	Art One Theater 2	December 5, 2017, to February 25, 2018	

== Accolades ==
=== Awards and nominations ===
Award ceremony	Year	Category	Nominee / Work	Result	Ref.
11th Korean Musical Awards	2006	Best Supporting Actor Award	Aida	Nominated	
18th Korean Musical Awards	2012	Best Supporting Actor Award	La Cage	Won	
6th DIMP Awards	2012	Daegu Performing Arts Star of the Year Award	Mozart Opera Rock	Won	
5th Korea Arts and Culture Awards	2017	Musical category	Kim Ho-young	Won	
14th Golden Ticket Awards	2019	Scene Stealer Award	Man of La Mancha	Won	
The Korean Contemporary Dance Association 2023 Korean Contemporary Dancers' Night	2023	Special Achievement Award in Korean Contemporary Dance	In recognition of his outstanding performance as an ambassador for MODAFE 2023 (42nd International Contemporary Dance Festival)	Won	
8th Korea Musical Award	2024	Best Supporting Actor Award	Rent	Won	
