= Kang Ho-dong =

South Korean comedian

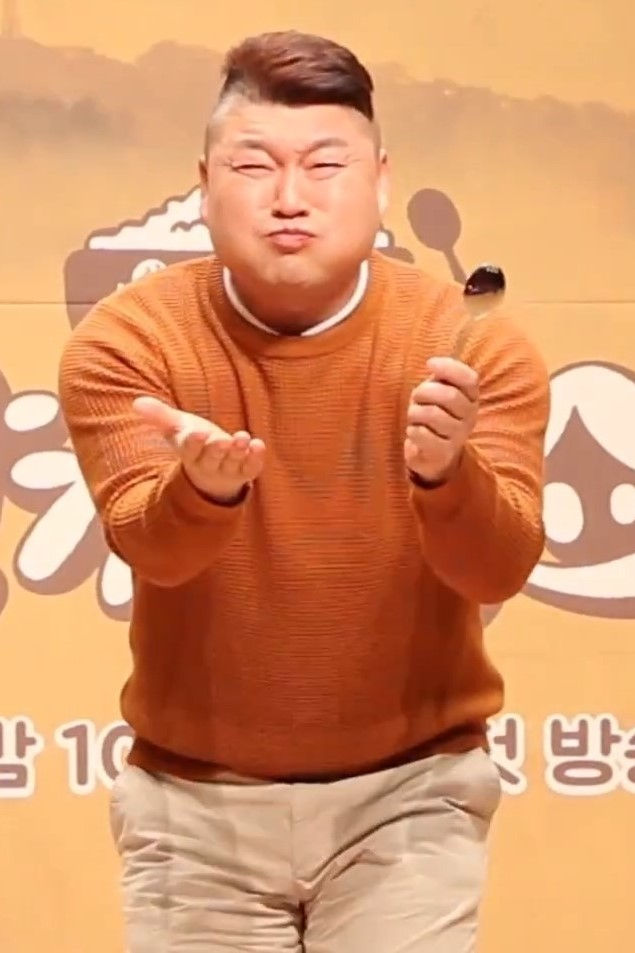
- Kang in 2016
- Born: July 14, 1970 (age 56); Jinju, South Gyeongsang Province, South Korea
- Employer: SM C&C
- Notable work: SBS X-Man; SBS Love Letter; SBS Star King MBC Golden Fishery; KBS Happy Sunday: 2 Days & 1 Night; SBS Strong Heart; KBS Our Neighborhood Arts and Physical Education; tvN New Journey to the West; JTBC Knowing Bros; tvN Kang's Kitchen
- Spouse: Lee Hyo-jin (이효진) (m. 2006)
- Children: 1

Comedy career
- Years active: 1993–present
- Genre: Comedy

Korean name
- Hangul: 강호동
- Hanja: 姜鎬童
- RR: Gang Hodong
- MR: Kang Hodong

Kang Ho-dong (born July 14, 1970) is a South Korean television host, comedian and former ssireum wrestler.

In 2008, Kang became the first comedian in history to win the Baeksang Arts Awards Daesang (Grand Prize) for Television category. This made him the first in history to achieve an entertainment awards Daesang grand slam, including KBS, MBC, SBS and Baeksang.

Along with comedian Yoo Jae-suk, he has terminated his contract with De Chocolate E&TF (a.k.a. Stom E&F) for issues of non-payment. On September 9, 2011, Kang announced that he would be taking a temporary leave of absence from the public eye due to rumors of tax evasion (which were later found to be caused by mistake by one of his agency's accountants). He announced his return to the entertainment industry in late 2012 with S.M. C&C as Kang's new agency.

== Personal life ==
Kang was born in Jinju on July 14, 1970 (11th day of the 6th lunar month), to a family of one brother and three sisters. Kang first met his wife on arranged double blind date with Yoo Jae-suk and on November 12, 2006, Kang married Lee Hyo-jin. They had their first child, a boy named Kang Si-hoo, on March 13, 2009.

== Career ==
Kang graduated from Masan Business High School. After graduating from high school, he started participating actively in professional Ssireum (Korean wrestling) matches. Early in his wrestling career, he lost many matches. However, on July 8, 1989, at the 44th national ssireum championships, the unseeded Kang managed to defeat the legendary Lee Mangi and went on to win the tournament, which marked the start of his successful Ssireum career. Known as 'Devil on the sand' for his arrogant and fearless demeanor, he went on to win the Baekdujangsa Ssireum Championship seven times and the Cheonhajangsa Ssireum Championship five times. He was widely recognized as the youngest ever Cheonhajangsa title holder.

After Kang retired from wrestling, he began his MC and comedian career in 1993, appearing on MBC as a talent. He was influenced by Lee Kyung-kyu, who is a famous MC and comedian in South Korea. He later became the host of a number of popular variety programs such as X-Man, Love Letter and Ya Shim Man Man. Kang has won numerous entertainment awards, and is widely recognized as one of the best television hosts in Korean television history. In 2011, he hosted four popular variety programs – Happy Sunday - 2 Days & 1 Night, Golden Fishery, Star King and Strong Heart.

In 2008, the 44th Baeksang Arts Awards, Kang became the first in history to win the TV category Daesang (Grand Prize) as a comedian. The Daesang had only been awarded to TV actors/actresses ever since its establishment and Kang is the first one to break this tradition.

On September 9, 2011, Kang held a press conference announcing his retirement from the entertainment industry due to his tax evasion controversy and demand for investigation by the National Tax Service. Kang was investigated for tax evasion. He was initially laid with a fine due to a discrepancy in his numbers, but it seems that there were no formal charges or processes made against the multi-entertainer. On December 17, the Seoul District Prosecutor Office announced, "In the case of the fine being less than $500,000 USD (per year), the National Tax Service must file a charge of tax evasion in order for the subject to be a suspect of tax evasion. However, there has been no such charge up until now, so we have decided to drop the case as of the 16th." Kang Ho Dong's fine amounts to $700,000 USD for a combined three years, significantly less than the required $500,000 USD per year. The National Tax Service added, "Kang Ho Dong's annual fine is less than the required $500,000 USD. Furthermore, he did not commit acts of intentional evasion. It is merely a mistake made on behalf of his accountant, so we will not be charging him with tax evasion.

On August 17, 2012, Kang signed an exclusive contract with SM C&C. CEO Lee Soo-man convinced Kang personally when he was retired along with fellow MC Shin Dong-yup SM Entertainment and made a comeback.

Kang had a rough time after his return to the industry. Multiple programs in three main public broadcasts were canceled because of low ratings. However, starting at the end of 2015, Kang hosted a number of new variety shows in cable broadcast including Knowing Bros, Let's Eat Dinner Together in JTBC and New Journey to the West series in tvN. All of these programs have received very good feedback and high ratings. Thanks to the popularity of the program New Journey to the West, a spin-off program called Kang's Kitchen was launched. As a result, Kang slowly regained his popularity and re-established his status of National MC.

He owns a chain of Korean barbecue restaurants called Baek Jeong.

== Notable programs ==
- Happy Sunday - 1 Night 2 Days is a wild variety program that airs on Sundays. Six or seven members, originally Kang Ho-dong (main MC), Lee Soo-geun, Eun Ji-won, Kim Jong-min, Ji Sang-ryul and Noh Hong-chul, later members in season 1 were Lee Seung-gi, Kim C, MC Mong, and Uhm Tae-woong, go on a trip for 1 night and 2 days and they play games (Bok-bul-bok) and present the beautiful scenery of South Korea to the viewers. Kang won his first Daesang from KBS during the annual KBS Entertainment Awards in 2008 for hosting 2 Days & 1 Night.
- Golden Fishery was a talk show that aired on Wednesdays. Kang Ho-dong played a "knee guru" to whom celebrities presented a current problem and Kang, along with popular comedian Yoo Se-yoon and All Rise Band, tried to come up with a solution.
- Star King is a talent variety program that airs on Saturdays. Each week, there are different challengers who compete for the title "STAR KING" and guests stars are invited to be the judges of the competition.
- Strong Heart was a talk show originally hosted by Kang Ho-dong and Lee Seung-gi. It aired on Tuesdays. Each week, 24 guest stars were invited to share their entertaining or heartwarming stories that are related to the theme assigned and the guest with the most touching story was presented with the "Strong Heart" title.
- Barefooted Friends was a variety and travel show where the hosts visited various countries in Asia, blending in by living like the locals in that specific country. Kang Ho-Dong was permanent host to the end of the show, alongside Yoon Shi-yoon, Yoon Jong-shin, Yoo Se-yoon, Kim Bum-soo, Eunhyuk, Kim Hyun-joong and Uee
- Our Neighborhood Arts and Physical Education or Cool Kiz on the Block is a variety sports show where the members play amateur sports games. When a sport ends, new members join the cast. Only the three permanent members stay, currently Kang Ho-dong (main MC), Jeong Hyeong-don, and Yang Sangguk. The members play against amateur or professional teams, and often fellow stars. At the KBS 2013 entertainment awards, Cool Kiz on the Block received a reward for the best teamwork.
- New Journey to the West is a Korean reality TV series well known for reuniting the original cast and producer from the "golden era" of the KBS2 variety show "1 Night 2 Days," "New Journey to the West," named after the Chinese legend "Journey to the West," features a trip undertaken by Korean TV personalities Kang Ho-dong, Lee Soo-geun, Eun Ji-won and Lee Seung-gi for 1st season. The first season of the show garnered an accumulated 50 million views on domestic portals by April 19, 2016.
- New Journey to the West 2 is a sequel series of New Journey to the West starring South Korean comedians Kang Ho-dong, Lee Soo-geun, singer Eun Ji-won and actor Ahn Jae-hyeon replaced Lee Seung-gi due to his attend to serve active military duty. The sequel however was watched more than 211 million times on Tencent (http://v.qq.com) as of Friday, tvN said. It is the shortest time a video has ever taken on the website to break 1 million views, the South Korean cable network said, adding the show has remained No. 1 in the entertainment category since premiering 45 days ago. (reported by 2016-06-04 11:16)

== Filmography ==
=== Television drama ===
Year	Title	Note
1992	Windmills of Love	Cameo
1992	Hotel	Cameo
1997	Three Guys and Three Girls	Cameo
2002	Nonstop 3	Cameo
2005	Old Miss Diary	Cameo
2016	Listen to Love	Cameo (ep.3)

=== Television shows ===
Off-Air On-Air

Year	Title	Role
1997	Open Comedy - Mother	
1999, 2002	Joyful Super Sunday TV - MC Standby Cue	
2002-2003	Kang Ho-dong's Soulmates	
2002-2004	Beautiful Sunday	
2003	Big Stars, First Looks	
2003	Saturday Wishes	
2003-2007	X-Man	Main Host
2003-2009	Ya Shim Man Man (S 1,2)	Main Host
2004	Healthy Men and Women	
2004	Star Olympiad	
2004	Medical Non-Fiction! Last Warning	
2004-2005	Experimental Show, Really?! Really!	
2004-2006	Love Letter	Main Host
2006-2011, 2012-2013	Golden Fishery	
2007	Are You Ready	
2007-2011	2 Days & 1 Night: Season 1	Regular Member
2007-2011, 2012-2016	Star King	Main Host
2009-2011	Strong Heart	Main Host
2013	Moonlight Prince	Main Host
2013	Barefooted Friends	Main Host
2013-2016	Our Neighborhood Arts and Physical Education	Main Host
2014	Star Gazing	Main Host
2015	Invisible Man	Regular Member
2015	New Journey to the West: Season 1	Main Host
2015-2016	Mari and Me	Regular Member
2015–present	Knowing Bros	Main Host
2016	National Chef Team	Main Host
2016	New Journey to the West: Season 2	Main Host
2016	Strong Man	Regular Member
2016	Sunshine Art Fitness	Regular Member
2016-2020	Let's Eat Dinner Together	Main Host
2017	New Journey to The West: Season 2.5	Main Host
2017	New Journey to The West: Season 3	Main Host
2017	Real Class - Elementary School	Main Host
2017	Island Trio	Main Host
2017	New Journey to The West: Season 4	Main Host
2017	Shadow Singer	Main Host
2017-2018	Kang's Kitchen	Owner and Main Chef
2018	Talkmon	
2018	For The First Time In My Life	Main Host
2018	Island Trio : Season 2	Main Host
2018	Great Escape	Main Host
2018	A Battle of One Voice: 300	Main Host
2018	New Journey to The West: Season 5	Regular Member
2018	New Journey to The West: Season 6	Regular Member
2018-2019	Eating Out Day	Main Host
2018-2019	We Will Channel You	Regular Member
2018-2019	Amor Fati	MC
2019	Everyone's Kitchen	Main Host
2019	The Great Escape: Season 2	Main Host
2019	300 X2	Main Host
2019	Kang's Kitchen 2	Regular Member
2019	Kang's Kitchen 3	Regular Member
2019	V-1	MC
2019	We Play	Regular Member
2019	The Ramyeonator	Main Host
2019-2020	New Journey to The West: Season 7	Regular Member
2019-2021	Eye Contact	Main Host
2020	The Great Escape: Season 3	Cast
2020	Eating Out Day: Season 2	Main Host
2020		Regular Member
2020	New Journey to The West: Season 8	Regular Member
2020-2021	Eat More Before You Leave	MC
2020-2021	Do you eat rice - Kang Ho-dong's rice heart	Host
2021	Job Estate	
2021	Voice King	Host
2021	Ho Dong's Camping Zone: Let's Choose	Regular Member
2021	The Great Escape: Season 4	Main Host
2021	The Great Home Cooking Research Institute	Main Host
2021-2022	Mamma Mian	Main Host
2022	One Tree Table	Cast Member
2022	Can't Cheat Blood	Main Host
2022	All Table Tennis!	Main Cast
2022	Daughter Thieves	Host
2022	National Science Representative	Host
2022	Round Table (Chuseok Special)	Host
2023	Hell Court	Host
2023	Golf Battle: Birdie Buddies 5	Cast Member
2023	Strong Heart League	Host
2023	Brother Ramyeon	Cast member
2025	Ten Million Trot Show	MC

=== Web shows ===
Year	Title	Role	Ref.
2020–2021	People Who Buy Time - About Time	MC	
2021	New Journey To The West Special "Spring Camp"	Cast Member	
2021	Merseon 129	Host	
2021	True Golfer	Regular Member	
2022	Goblin Stealing Wisdom	Host	
2022	Gannawa	Host	
2022–present	Kang Ho-dong Neighborhood Room	Main Cast	

== Music ==
- 2005: "Oh! Happy Day" (Christmas carol featuring child actress, Chae Eun)
- 2009: "Horror Show" (featured in MC Mong's repackaged album, Humanimal, also featured in the music video)
- 2018: "I kicked my luck off" (SM Station, Kang Ho-dong & Hong Jin-young)

== Awards and achievements ==
=== Ssireum (wrestling) ===
Year	Competition	Division	Result
1987	11th Hoejanggijaengtaljeon National Wrestling Championships (장사급)		Runner-up
1989	44th National Wrestling Championships	95.1 kg or more	Won
1990	47th National Wrestling Championships	95.1 kg or more	Won
1990	18th Wrestling Tournament Titans	Freeweight	Won
1991	54th National Wrestling Championships	95.1 kg or more	Won
1991	21st Wrestling Tournament Titans	Freeweight	Won
1992	24th Wrestling Tournament Titans	Freeweight	Won

=== Entertainment ===
Year	Award	Category	Results
1995	TV Journal Star King	Top Excellence Award	Won
1998	MBC Entertainment Awards	Excellence Award in a Comedy/Sitcom	Won
2002	MBC Entertainment Awards	Top Excellence Award in a Variety Show	Won
2003	SBS Entertainment Awards	Special Award, MC category	Won
2003	39th Baeksang Arts Awards	Best TV Entertainer (Soulmates)	Won
2003	SBS Drama Awards	Special Award Best Television MC	Won
2005	4th KBS Entertainment Awards	Special Award, MC category	Won
2005	SBS Drama Awards	Special Award Best Television MC	Won
2007	SBS Entertainment Awards	Daesang (Grand Prize)	Won
2007	6th KBS Entertainment Awards	Top Excellence Idea Corner Award	Won
2007	SBS Entertainment Awards	Korean Wave Program Award (X-man)	Won
2008	44th Baeksang Arts Awards	Daesang (Grand Prize)	Won
2008	7th KBS Entertainment Awards	Daesang (Grand Prize)	Won
2008	MBC Entertainment Awards	Daesang (Grand Prize)	Won
2008	20th Korean Producers' Award of Korea	Best Show Host (1 Night 2 Days)	Won
2008	SBS Entertainment Awards	Netizen's Choice Program of the Year Excellence Award (Star King)	Won
2008	2008 Famous Creative Entertainment	"1 of top 50"	Won
2008	9th Korea Visual Arts Awards	Photogenic Award, MC category	Won
2009	8th KBS Entertainment Awards	Daesang (Grand Prize)	Won
2009	8th KBS Entertainment Awards	Viewer's Choice Program (1 Night 2 Days)	Won
2009	SBS Entertainment Awards	Best Program Award (Strong Heart)	Won
2010	SBS Entertainment Awards	Daesang (Grand Prize)	Won
2010	SBS Entertainment Awards	Program of the Year Award (Star King)	Won
2010	SBS Entertainment Awards	SBS 20th Anniversary Entertainment 10 Star Award	Won
2010	Ministry of Culture, Sports and Tourism	Appreciation Plaque (1 Night 2 Days)	Won
2010	Korea Tourism Awards 2010	Merit Division (1 Night 2 Days)	Won
2010	9th KBS Entertainment Awards	Viewer's Choice Program (1 Night 2 Days)	Won
2011	SBS Entertainment Awards	Excellence Program Award (Talk Show Category) (Strong Heart)	Won
2013	SBS Entertainment Awards	Producer MC Award (Star King)	Won
2013	1st Gimcheon International Masters Diving Competition	Special Award (Barefooted Friends)	Won
2013	SBS Entertainment Awards	Producers award (TV sector)	Won
2013	12th KBS Entertainment Awards	Best Teamwork Award (Cool Kiz on the Block)	Won
2013	12th KBS Entertainment Awards	Kind to Rookie Award (Cool Kiz on the Block)	Won
2014	SBS Entertainment Awards	Excellence Award for Programs (Talk Shows category) (Star King)	Won
2015	14th KBS Entertainment Awards	Best Teamwork Award (Cool Kiz on the Block)	Won
2016	tvN10 Awards	Best Content Award, Variety (New Journey to the West)	Won
2022	1st Blue Dragon Series Awards	Best Male Entertainer	Won

=== State honors ===
Name of country, year given, and name of honor
Country	Year	Honor	Ref.
South Korea (Note: Honors are given at the Korean Popular Culture and Arts Awards, arranged by the Korea Creative Content Agency and hosted by the Ministry of Culture, Sports and Tourism. They are awarded to those who have contributed to the arts and South Korea's pop culture.)	2020	Presidential Commendation	

=== Listicles ===
Name of publisher, year listed, name of listicle, and placement
Publisher	Year	Listicle	Placement	Ref.
Forbes	2010	Korea Power Celebrity	10th	
Forbes	2011	Korea Power Celebrity	10th	
Forbes	2012	Korea Power Celebrity	12th	
Forbes	2018	Korea Power Celebrity	27th	

== Notes ==
Awards and achievements
Preceded by Tak Jae-hoon	KBS Entertainment Awards - Daesang; 2008 & 2009	Succeeded by Kang Ho-dong
