= Star King (TV program) =

South Korean TV show

- Also known as: Amazing Contest Star King
- Genre: Reality television / Comedy
- Presented by: Kang Ho-dong (2007 – 2011 / 2012 – 2016); Boom (2011 – 2013); Leeteuk (2011 – 2012 / 2015 – 2016)
- Country of origin: South Korea
- Original language: Korean

Production
- Producers: Bae Sung Woo; Kim Jin Ho
- Camera setup: Multi-camera
- Running time: 75-80 minutes per episode

Original release
- Network: SBS
- Release: January 13, 2007 – August 9, 2016

Star King (Korean: 놀라운 대회 스타킹; Hanja: 놀라운 大會 스타킹) is a South Korean television show which first aired on January 13, 2007 on the SBS network. Star King was the first TV show in Korea to run both online and on television simultaneously. The last episode of "Star King" aired on August 9, 2016.

== Format ==
The show is composed of four segments:

- Only This (딸랑 이거): featuring people with a humorous or unusual skill.
- Train Me! (키워주세요): for contestants seeking to be famous.
- Diet King (다이어트 킹): focusing on people attempting to lose weight. Shawn Lee, a previous winner, lost approximately 40 kg in 60 days.

Viewers upload videos of unusual events and stories to the official website. People and animals with unusual talents are then invited onto the program after being selected from these videos. The audience votes for their favorite person, video or story, and prize money is awarded to the contestant who receives the most votes.

Episodes typically feature people from a variety of countries, including Brazil, Mongolia and Kenya. Participants are of all ages.

== Critical reception ==
At one point, Star King held the top spot in audience ratings of any prime time TV show on Saturday. It suffered a drop in ratings after a "fabrication" scandal.

Star King was originally hosted by Kang Ho-dong, a well-known MC, who left the show due to a tax payment controversy.

== Winners and guests ==
- Season 1: Grandpa Rain
- Season 2: 11-year-old BoA (now Seunghee of Oh My Girl)
- Seasons 3 and 4: 40-year-old Dong Bang Shin Ki
- Season 6: 10-year-old Ballad Genius Baek Ye-rin
- Seasons 8 and 9: 5-year-old Mozart
- Season 16: Magic Rainbow dance
- Season 18 and 19: Dangerous boy
- Season 21, 22, and 23: Gugak boy
- Season 24 and 25: Spider man
- Season 26: Fire breathing human
- Season 33: One legged B-boy
- Season 34: Treasure of Mongo
- Season 38: Blind orchestra
- Season 39: B-boy T.I.P.
- Season 52: MoM B-boy
- Season 57: Super Junior Band
- Season 62, 64, and 65: Shadow Show
- Season 68, 69, and 70: 11-year-old drummer
- Season 79, 80, and 81: Two-handed guitar
- Season 84, 85, and 86: Bubble Artist
- Season 93, 95, and 96: OIDO Family Band
- Season 140: Bucheon Bicycle F4
- Season 142: 7-year-old B-boy
