= Golden Fishery =

- Genre: Talk show
- Starring: Kim Gu-ra; Yoon Jong-shin; Kim Kook-jin; Kyuhyun; You Se-yoon
- Country of origin: South Korea
- Original language: Korean
- No. of episodes: 462

Production
- Executive producer: Kwon Suk
- Producers: Park Jung-kyu; Hwang Kyo-jin
- Running time: 60-80 minutes

Original release
- Network: MBC
- Release: July 7, 2006 – present

Golden Fishery (Korean: 황금어장; Hanja: 黃金漁場) is a South Korean talk show broadcast on MBC. It first aired on the July 7, 2006 and has had a fairly stable audience share. Currently, Radio Star is the main segment in this program.

== True Story Theatre ==
Golden Fishery first aired on July 7, 2006 with True Story Theatre (실화극장) as the main segment. It originally started out with two main MCs, Kang Ho-dong and Jung Sun-hee with Shin Jung-hwan, Kim Hye-sung and Im Chae-moo as the main panels. The main MCs stayed the same but the panels were changed frequently. Kim Sung-ju, Ock Joo-hyun, Andy, Lee Ji-hoon, and You Se-yoon were some of the regular panelists in Golden Fishery'. The original True Story Theatre featured skits which acted out people's problems posted up on their homepage. This segment began to disappear in December 2006 due to the popularity of The Knee-Drop Guru and completely disappeared in March 2007.

== The Knee-Drop Guru ==
The Knee-Drop Guru (무릎팍 도사) first aired on January 3, 2007. Initially, it was just a special New Year program. However, it became popular and became a regular segment in February that year and is still loved by many people. The segment ended on October 12, 2011 due to the temporary retirement of Kang Ho-dong.

The Knee-Drop Guru is a talk show with a unique premise. According to the theme, clients (celebrity guests) visit The Knee-Drop Guru to discuss about their problems and to seek advice from him. The talk show is known for having famous or controversial guests. Some of the celebrities even volunteer to appear on the show to clarify rumors about themselves. The Knee-Drop Guru features a variety of guests from celebrities to cultural and political figures. The show appeals to many viewers because of the host's harsh, insensitive and honest questions and comments.

The Knee-Drop Guru (Kang Ho-dong) supposedly listens to the guests' problems and solves them. His name indicates that he knows everything before the clients kneel down in front of him. However, he actually attacks the guests with tough questions and leads the guests to talk about many unknown things about themselves. After all, The Knee-Drop Guru is a talk show, even though it doesn't seem like one. The Rude Guru (You Se-yoon)'s concept is "rude", just like his name. As The Knee-Drop Guru's assistant, his job is to introduce the guests' profiles and make insensitive comments here and there. He is known for purposely amplifying the guests' controversies and simply being "rude". The Band Boy (All Lies Band) was not an original member of The Knee-Drop Guru. He actually came to play guitar and sing the theme song of The Knee-Drop God. However, the rare comments he made were found to be so wise and hilarious that he became part of the cast.

== Radio Star ==
Radio Star (라디오 스타) was the second segment of Golden Fishery. It is another talk show, but it is approached in different ways as The Knee-Drop Guru. It is hosted by four DJs: Kim Gu-ra, Yoon Jong-shin, Kim Gook-jin, and Kyuhyun. They call their show "a high quality music talk show", as it focuses on the comedy aspect rather than the music aspect. Originally consisting of Kim Gu-ra, Yoon Jong-shin, and Shin Jung-hwan, Shindong was added as DJ until he was replaced by Kim Kook-jin. In 2011, Shin Jung-hwan was replaced by Heechul of Super Junior, after he was involved in an illegal gambling controversy overseas. Whereupon Heechul was replaced by fellow member Kyuhyun in September 2011, when he enlisted for mandatory military service.

Radio Star is different from other Korean talk shows because it is very informal and it talks about guests' and even host's sensitive pasts. While The Knee-Drop Guru has A-list celebrities as its guest stars, Radio Star tends to talk with B-list or even C-list celebrities. The atmosphere of the show is much lighter than The Knee-Drop Guru, as the hosts talk and joke about anything with the guest stars. In the beginning, the show was outshadowed by The Knee-Drop Guru as expected. There were several occasions when Radio Star only received 5 minutes of airtime when The Knee-Drop Guru received 1 hour. However, as the show went on, it has been gaining popularity. The audience seems to enjoy the wittiness of the hosts and the interaction between the guests and the hosts.

Following the cancellation of The Knee-Drop Guru, Radio Star became the main and only segment of Golden Fishery. In November 2011, You Se-yoon was recruited as the fifth DJ of Radio Star, returning to Golden Fishery after The Knee-Drop Guru's cancellation.

In April 2012, MC Kim Gu-ra quit the programme, following controversy over a 2002 audio clip from a radio programme, where he akin comfort women to prostitutes. Gura returned to the program 14 months later.
