= Lee Hyuk-jae =

South Korean film actor and comedian (born 1973)

- Born: July 5, 1973 (age 53); Incheon

Comedy career
- Years active: 1993–present
- Medium: Stand-up; Television comedy
- Genres: Observational; Sketch; Wit; Parody; Slapstick; Dramatic; Sitcom

- Lee Hyuk-jae
- Hangul: 이혁재
- Hanja: 李赫宰
- RR: I Hyeokjae
- MR: I Hyŏkchae

Lee Hyuk-jae (Korean: 이혁재; born on July 5, 1973) is a South Korean comedian.

== Filmography ==
=== Television shows ===
- Road Show Quiz Expedition (KBS2, 2008–2009)

== Awards and nominations ==
Year	Award	Category	Nomination	Result	Ref
2004	KBS Entertainment Awards	Grand Prize		Won	
