= Chicken fight =

Informal game

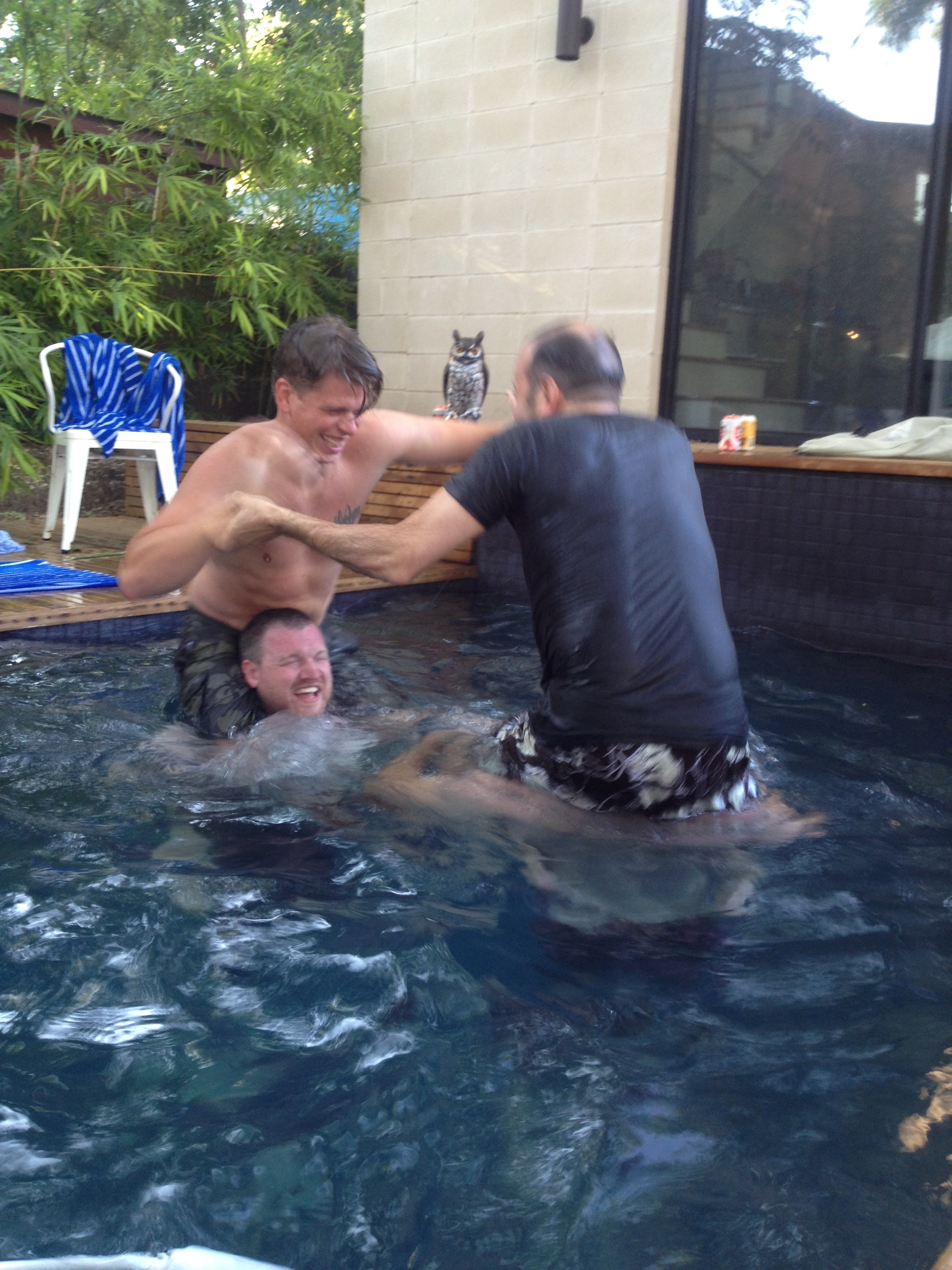
Men in a pool chicken fighting

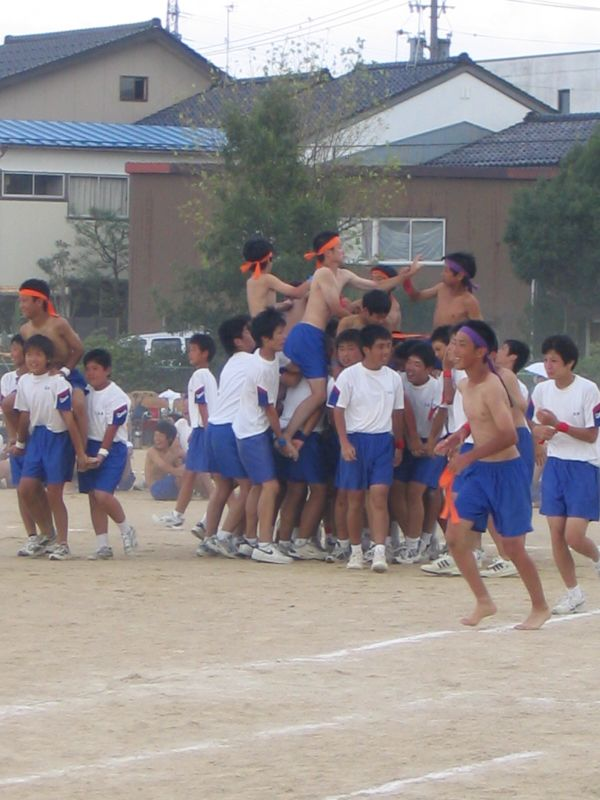
Japanese students participating in kibasen

A chicken fight, also known as shoulder wars, is an informal game, often played in a lake or swimming pool, characterized by one team member sitting on the shoulders of their team mate or riding piggy-back. The object of the game is to knock down or separate an opposing team through team effort. The person on top is considered to be the "attacker" while the person below is considered to be the "vehicle". The person below may not use arms or hands and must rely on momentum to attack by running into the other team. The person on his/her shoulders is the "attacker" and may use any means possible of separating the other team or knocking them to the ground. If a team is separated or knocked down in any way, they are required to resign from the game and the last team to remain together is considered the winner. It is not uncommon for this game to be banned in swimming pools due to safety concerns.

A similar Japanese game called kibasen (騎馬戦; literally "cavalry fight") is commonly played as part of an annual sports day event at elementary and junior high schools. It is a field event rather than a swimming event. In it, a team of four competitors work together, with three carrying the fourth, who wears a bandana (hachimaki) or hat. The team is defeated if they are knocked over or, more commonly, if their bandana/hat is removed by an opponent. Competitors are often divided into opposing red and white factions. In recent years some schools have removed physically demanding events such as the kibasen from sports day programs due to the risk of serious injury. In a 2003 incident a high school student in Fukuoka Prefecture was left quadriplegic after falling from his teammates' shoulders.
