= Yoo Se-yoon =

South Korean entertainer (born 1980)

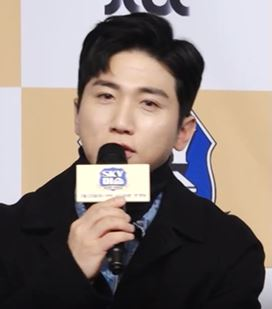
- Yoo in 2019
- Born: September 12, 1980 (age 46); Seoul, South Korea
- Spouse: Hwang Gyeong-hui (m. 2009)
- Children: 1

Comedy career
- Years active: 2004–present

Korean name
- Hangul: 유세윤
- Hanja: 兪世潤
- RR: Yu Seyun
- MR: Yu Seyun
- Website: yooseyoon.com

Yoo Se-yoon (Korean: 유세윤; born September 12, 1980) is a South Korean comedian and television comedy show host. He hosts and co-hosts a variety of shows, in addition to being a part of musical/comedic duo, UV. Yoo has been a part of shows such as South Korean talk show Non-Summit, Witch Hunt, SNL Korea, South Korean talk show Golden Fishery as well as its segments, Knee Drop Guru and Radio Star.

== Early life ==
Yoo was born to parents Yo Un-ja(mother) and Yoo Young-Tae(father) in 1980. Yoo grew up with his mom, as his parents went through a divorce when he was in elementary school. Yoo originally dreamed of being a movie director when he was young.

== Career ==
=== Comedy ===
Yoo became an officially recruited comedian at the 19th annual public recruitment of comedians for the South Korean TV network KBS in 2004. Yoo's debut comedy sketch was "Navigation" on May 2, 2005, with comedians Yoo sang moo and Jang Dong-min. In 2005, Yoo played the character of a returning student, usually after mandatory military service or other hardships, that can not keep up with the trends with his peers (known as 'bokhaksaeng' in Korean) in the popular comedy segment called 'Bongsungahakdang', becoming well known for the catch phrase "Colour Power!". He gained further popularity with the comedy segment "Are you kidding?" (장난하냐?). Yoo also gained popularity in 2006 for a comedy segment called "Love counselor" (사랑의 카운슬러), where the familiar stories of couples told in a comedic fashion proved very popular.

=== Music (UV) ===
UV is a theatrical rock band with musical instrumentals. They are known for creating a highly diverse mix of music with comedic lyrics which they promote only through their own show on South Korean music channel, Mnet titled "UV Syndrome".

UV debuted in 2010 with "No Cool, I'm Sorry", a song that depicts a break up between two lovers through a comic lens. Their later work includes parodies such as "Itaewon Freedom" featuring CEO of JYP Entertainment/musician Park Jin-young, and "Who am I" based on The Beatles. The music video of "Convenience", also released in 2010, featured characters and artwork from Welcome to Convenience Store.

In 2011, UV performed in the New Year's Eve festivities at Times Square (Seoul).

In August 2013, UV released their EP entitled "It Can't Be True". This release marked the return of Yoo to the entertainment industry after voluntarily surrendering to police for driving under the influence in May 2013.

UV performed on and had writing credits for several songs on the 'Original Motion Picture Soundtrack' of the 2014 Korean movie 플랜맨 (The Plan Man).

=== Music (Solo) ===
Occasionally, Yoo releases musical parodies on various aspects of pop culture such as his second EP titled "Kkattalk" which makes fun of the South Korean instant messaging service KakaoTalk.

== Legal troubles ==
In 2013, Yoo self-confessed his drunk driving after driving his car for 30 km.

== Filmography ==
=== Film ===
Year	Title	Role	Notes	Ref.
2021	Ideal	himself	Fake Film Documentary	

=== Television show ===
Year	Title	Role	Notes	Ref.
2021–2023	Divorced Singles	Host	Season 1–4	
2021	Candy Singers	Host	with Leeteuk	
2021	Cooking - The Birth of King Lee	Main Host		
2021	Han Cooker	Host	with Jang Dong-min	
2021	We Cycle	Host		
2021	Call me	Host		
2021	Books, Memories	Main Host		
2021	Weekly Mountain Club	Host	with Song Jin-woo	
2021	The Age of Destiny	Cast Member		
2022	Room Corner 1 Row	Host		
2022	Doll Singles Gaiden	Host	with John Park	
2022	Oh! My Wedding	Wedding planner		
2022	Star Birth	Star maker		
2022	Ava Dream	Host	with Lee Yong-jin	
2025	Trendy Table	Cast member	with Sunwoo Yong-nyeo	

=== Web shows ===
Year	Title	Role	Notes	Ref.
2021	Dad had a plan	Host	with Rhymer	
2023	Webtoon Singer	Host	with Choi Min-ho and Jang Do-yeon	
