= List of X-Man episodes =

The following is a list of episodes of South Korean variety game show television series X-Man. It was broadcast on SBS from November 8, 2003 to April 8, 2007, with a total of 178 episodes were aired.

== X-Man ==
=== Real Situation Saturday ===
- Aired: November 8, 2003 – October 9, 2004

#	Original Airdate	X-Man # / Episode #	Hosts	Guests	Missions	X-Man
1	November 8, 2003	X-Man 1 Episode 1	MC: Kim Je-dong; 强(Kang) Team Leader: Kang Ho-dong; 柔(Yu) Team Leader: Yoo Jae-suk	Kang Team: Kim Kyung-ho, Eun Ji-won, Annie, Yoon Hyun-jin; Yu Team: Kim C, Tony An, Kim Jong-min, Park Ye-jin	Main Mission 1: Tongue Twisters Relay (줄줄이 말해요); Mission 2: Suspicion Talk (지목토크)	Yoon Hyun-jin (Chosen)
2	November 15, 2003	X-Man 1 Episode 2	MC: Kim Je-dong; 强(Kang) Team Leader: Kang Ho-dong; 柔(Yu) Team Leader: Yoo Jae-suk	Kang Team: Kim Kyung-ho, Eun Ji-won, Annie, Yoon Hyun-jin; Yu Team: Kim C, Tony An, Kim Jong-min, Park Ye-jin	Mission 3: Baby Warriors (아기 천하장사); Mission 4: Catch Loves Ball (사랑은 공을 타고~); Mission 5: Who is it? (누굴까요?); Final Mission: The Last Choice (최후의 선택)	Suspected: Kang Ho-dong Yoon Hyun-jin (Not Found)
3	November 22, 2003	X-Man 1 Episode 3	MC: Kim Je-dong; 强(Kang) Team Leader: Kang Ho-dong; 柔(Yu) Team Leader: Yoo Jae-suk	Kang Team: Kim Kyung-ho, Eun Ji-won, Annie, Yoon Hyun-jin; Yu Team: Kim C, Tony An, Kim Jong-min, Park Ye-jin	Main Mission 1: Team! Horse Riding (단결! 말타기); Order-deciding Game: Survival Chicken Fight (서바이벌 닭싸움); Main Mission 2: Tongue Twisters Relay (줄줄이 말해요); Mission 3: First Vote (일차투표)/Suspicion Talk (지목토크)	Yoon Hyun-jin (Active)
4	November 29, 2003	X-Man 1 Episode 4	MC: Kim Je-dong; 强(Kang) Team Leader: Kang Ho-dong; 柔(Yu) Team Leader: Yoo Jae-suk	Kang Team: Kim Kyung-ho, Eun Ji-won, Annie, Yoon Hyun-jin; Yu Team: Kim C, Tony An, Kim Jong-min, Park Ye-jin	Mission 3: Balance Beam Fight (평균대 결투); Order-deciding Game: Survival Chicken Fight (서바이벌 닭싸움); Mission 4: Love's Chopsticks (사랑의 젓가락); Mission 5: Let's Study (공부합시다); Final Mission: The Last Choice (최후의 선택)	Suspected: Yoo Jae-suk Yoon Hyun-jin (Not Found)
5	December 6, 2003	X-Man 1 Episode 5	MC: Kim Je-dong; 强(Kang) Team Leader: Kang Ho-dong; 柔(Yu) Team Leader: Yoo Jae-suk	Kang Team: Kim Kyung-ho, Eun Ji-won, Annie, Yoon Hyun-jin; Yu Team: Kim C, Tony An, Kim Jong-min, Park Ye-jin	Mission 1: Piggyback Toy Hammers (어부바 뿅망치); Main Mission 2: Tongue Twisters Relay (줄줄이 말해요); Mission 3: First Vote (일차투표)/Suspicion Talk (지목토크)	Yoon Hyun-jin (Active)
6	December 13, 2003	X-Man 1 Episode 6	MC: Kim Je-dong; 强(Kang) Team Leader: Kang Ho-dong; 柔(Yu) Team Leader: Yoo Jae-suk	Kang Team: Kim Kyung-ho, Eun Ji-won, Annie, Yoon Hyun-jin; Yu Team: Kim C, Tony An, Kim Jong-min, Park Ye-jin	Mission 4: Newspaper Game (신문지 게임); Mission 5: Team Telepathy (단결 이심전심); Order-deciding Game: Survival Butt Pushing (서바이벌 엉덩이 밀치기); Mission 6: Lion! Grasshopper! Relay (포자! 메뚜기! 릴레이)	Suspected: Yoon Hyun-jin (Found)
6	Notes	In X-Man 1, challengers have 3 chances (1 chance = 2 episodes) to find X-Man.				
7	December 20, 2003	X-Man 2 Episode 7	MC: Yoo Jae-suk; 强(Kang) Team Leader: Kang Ho-dong; 柔(Yu) Team Leader: Kim Je-dong	Kang Team: Shin Hye-sung, Andy, Kim Hung-Su, Han Eun-jung, Lee Ji-hye; Yu Team: Tony An, Kim Jong-min, Sung Si-kyung, Jadu, Kim Ji-yun	Main Mission 1: Team! Horse Riding (단결! 말타기); Order-deciding Game: Survival Pull The Rope (서바이벌 줄당기기); Mission 2: Team! Feet Feet (단결! 다리다리); Mission 3: First Vote (일차투표)	Tony An (Chosen)
8	December 27, 2003	X-Man 2 Episode 8	MC: Yoo Jae-suk; 强(Kang) Team Leader: Kang Ho-dong; 柔(Yu) Team Leader: Kim Je-dong	Kang Team: Shin Hye-sung, Andy, Kim Hung-Su, Han Eun-jung, Lee Ji-hye; Yu Team: Tony An, Kim Jong-min, Sung Si-kyung, Jadu, Kim Ji-yun	Mission 3: Tongue Twisters Relay (줄줄이 말해요); Order-deciding Game: Survival Push Over (서바이벌 밀어내기); Mission 4: High Jump (높이 뛰기); Mission 5: Love~ Message! (러브~ 메시지!)	Suspected: Han Eun-jung Tony An (Not Found)
9	January 3, 2004	X-Man 2 Episode 9	MC: Yoo Jae-suk; 强(Kang) Team Leader: Kang Ho-dong; 柔(Yu) Team Leader: Kim Je-dong	Kang Team: Shin Hye-sung, Andy, Kim Hung-Su, Han Eun-jung, Lee Ji-hye; Yu Team: Tony An, Kim Jong-min, Sung Si-kyung, Jadu, Kim Ji-yun	Mission 1: Team! Catch the Tail (단결! 꼬리잡기); Mission 2: Tongue Twisters Relay (줄줄이 말해요); Order-deciding Game: Butt Pushing (엉덩이 밀치기)	Tony An (Active)
10	January 10, 2004	X-Man 2 Episode 10	MC: Yoo Jae-suk; 强(Kang) Team Leader: Kang Ho-dong; 柔(Yu) Team Leader: Kim Je-dong	Kang Team: Shin Hye-sung, Andy, Kim Hung-Su, Han Eun-jung, Lee Ji-hye; Yu Team: Tony An, Kim Jong-min, Sung Si-kyung, Jadu, Kim Ji-yun	Mission 3: New Marriages are Beautiful (신혼은 아름다워); Mission 4: Survival Push Over (서바이벌 밀어내기); Mission 5: Queen Bee Chicken Fighting (여왕벌 닭싸움)	Suspected: Tony An (Found)
10	Notes	Yoo Jae-suk becomes the main MC and Kim Je-dong takes over as Yu Team Leader. Challengers only have 2 chances to find X-Man now. One X-Man is 4 episodes.				
11	January 17, 2004	X-Man 3 Episode 11	MC: Yoo Jae-suk; 强(Kang) Team Leader: Kang Ho-dong; 金(Kim) Team Leader: Kim Je-dong	Kang Team: Andy, Lee Min-woo, Go Young-wook, Jang Na-ra, Annie; Kim Team: Kim Jong-min, Lee Beom-soo, Bong Tae-gyu, Yoon Eun-hye, Dana	Mission 1: Team! Horse Riding (단결! 말타기); Order-deciding Game: Butt Pushing (엉덩이 밀치기); Mission 2: Tongue Twisters Relay (줄줄이 말해요); Order-deciding Game: Survival X-Man (서바이벌 X맨)	Lee Bum-su (Chosen)
12	January 24, 2004	X-Man 3 Episode 12	MC: Yoo Jae-suk; 强(Kang) Team Leader: Kang Ho-dong; 金(Kim) Team Leader: Kim Je-dong	Kang Team: Andy, Lee Min-woo, Go Young-wook, Jang Na-ra, Annie; Kim Team: Kim Jong-min, Lee Beom-soo, Bong Tae-gyu, Yoon Eun-hye, Dana	Mission 3: Couple Event: Hug~ Your Love!! (사랑을 그대 품~안에!!); Mission 4: Love~ Message!! (러브~ 메시지!!); Mission 5: Skewered Relay (꼬치꼬치 릴레이); Order-deciding Game: Survival Push Over (서바이벌 밀어내기)	Suspected: Kim Jong-min Lee Bum-Su (Not Found)
13	January 31, 2004	X-Man 3 Episode 13	MC: Yoo Jae-suk; 强(Kang) Team Leader: Kang Ho-dong; 金(Kim) Team Leader: Kim Je-dong	Kang Team: Andy, Lee Min-woo, Go Young-wook, Jang Na-ra, Annie; Kim Team: Kim Jong-min, Lee Beom-soo, Bong Tae-gyu, Yoon Eun-hye, Dana	Warm-Up Game: Talk Fight (말싸움); Mission 1: Team! Horse Riding (단결! 말타기); Order-deciding Game: Survival Butt Pushing (서바이벌 엉덩이 밀치기); Mission 2: Tongue Twisters Relay (줄줄이 말해요); Order-deciding Game: Survival Hand Push Over (서바이벌 손바닥 밀치기)	Lee Bum-su (Active)
14	February 7, 2004	X-Man 3 Episode 14	MC: Yoo Jae-suk; 强(Kang) Team Leader: Kang Ho-dong; 金(Kim) Team Leader: Kim Je-dong	Kang Team: Andy, Lee Min-woo, Go Young-wook, Jang Na-ra, Annie; Kim Team: Kim Jong-min, Lee Beom-soo, Bong Tae-gyu, Yoon Eun-hye, Dana	Mission 3: Couple Balloon Quiz (커플 붕선퀴즈); Mission 4: Couple Event: New Marriages are Beautiful (신혼은 아름다워)	Suspected: Dana Lee Bum-Su (Not Found/Succeeds)
14	Notes	Yu Team becomes Kim Team to reflect the new team leader.				
15	February 14, 2004	X-Man 4 Episode 15	MC: Yoo Jae-suk; 强(Kang) Team Leader: Kang Ho-dong; 金(Kim) Team Leader: Kim Je-dong	Kang Team: Eun Ji-won, Andy, Namkoong Min, Lee Jin, Lee Hwa-sun; Kim Team: Lee Hoon, Kim Jong-min, Park Jun-suk, Yoon Eun-hye, Choi Ha-na	Mission 1: Team! Horse Riding (단결! 말타기); Order-deciding Game: Survival Butt Pushing (서바이벌 엉덩이 밀치기); Mission 2: Balloon Quiz (붕선퀴즈)	Lee Jin (Chosen)
16	February 21, 2004	X-Man 4 Episode 16	MC: Yoo Jae-suk; 强(Kang) Team Leader: Kang Ho-dong; 金(Kim) Team Leader: Kim Je-dong	Kang Team: Eun Ji-won, Andy, Namkoong Min, Lee Jin, Lee Hwa-sun; Kim Team: Lee Hoon, Kim Jong-min, Park Jun-suk, Yoon Eun-hye, Choi Ha-na	Mission 3: Couple Event: New Marriages are Beautiful (신혼은 아름다워); Mission 4: Tongue Twisters Relay (줄줄이 말해요); Order-deciding Game: Survival Hand Wrestling (서바이벌 손씨름)	Suspected: Kang Ho-dong Lee Jin (Not Found/Succeeds)
16	Notes	Challengers only have 1 chance to find X-Man. One X-Man now is only 2 episodes.				
17	February 28, 2004	X-Man 5 Episode 17	MC: Yoo Jae-suk; 强(Kang) Team Leader: Kang Ho-dong; 金(Kim) Team Leader: Kim Je-dong	Kang Team: Jun Jin, Andy, Namkoong Min, Lee Ji-hyun, Lee Hwa-sun; Kim Team: Gong Hyung-jin, Lee Sung-jin, h, Kim Jun-hee, Dana	Mission 1: Team! Horse Riding (단결! 말타기); Order-deciding Game: Butt Pushing (엉덩이 밀치기); Mission 2: Couple Quiz (커플 퀴즈)	Andy (Chosen)
18	March 6, 2004	X-Man 5 Episode 18	MC: Yoo Jae-suk; 强(Kang) Team Leader: Kang Ho-dong; 金(Kim) Team Leader: Kim Je-dong	Kang Team: Jun Jin, Andy, Namkoong Min, Lee Ji-hyun, Lee Hwa-sun; Kim Team: Gong Hyung-jin, Lee Sung-jin, h, Kim Jun-hee, Dana	Mission 3: Couple Event: New Marriages are Beautiful (신혼은 아름다워); Mission 4: Tongue Twisters Relay (줄줄이 말해요); Order-deciding Game: Scary Hand Wrestling (공포의 손씨름)	Suspected: Kim Jun-hee Andy (Not Found/Succeeds)
19	March 13, 2004	X-Man 6 Episode 19	MC: Yoo Jae-suk; 强(Kang) Team Leader: Kang Ho-dong; 金(Kim) Team Leader: Kim Je-dong	Kang Team: Lee Min-woo, Andy, Namkoong Min, Lee Jin, Lee Hwa-sun; Kim Team: Kim Sung-su, Kim Jong-min, Choi Hyun-ho, Dana, Kim Yeon-ju	Mission 1: Team! Horse Riding (단결! 말타기); Order-deciding Game: Butt Pushing (엉덩이 밀치기); Mission 2: Couple Balloon Quiz (커플 붕선퀴즈)	Kim Jong-min (Chosen)
20	March 20, 2004	X-Man 6 Episode 20	MC: Yoo Jae-suk; 强(Kang) Team Leader: Kang Ho-dong; 金(Kim) Team Leader: Kim Je-dong	Kang Team: Lee Min-woo, Andy, Namkoong Min, Lee Jin, Lee Hwa-sun; Kim Team: Kim Sung-su, Kim Jong-min, Choi Hyun-ho, Dana, Kim Yeon-ju	Mission 3: Couple Event: New Marriages are Beautiful (신혼은 아름다워); Mission 4: Tongue Twisters Relay (줄줄이 말해요); Order-deciding Game: Survival Foot Wrestling (서바이벌 발씨름)	Suspected: Namkoong Min Kim Jong-min (Not Found/Succeeds)
21	March 27, 2004	X-Man 7 Episode 21	MC: Yoo Jae-suk; 强(Kang) Team Leader: Kang Ho-dong; 金(Kim) Team Leader: Kim Je-dong	Kang Team: Lee Jong-su, Andy, Lee Ki-woo, Yuri, Lee Ji-hyun, Lee Hwa-sun; Kim Team: Tony An, Kim Jong-min, Choi Hyun-ho, Lexy, Ha Ri-su, Dana	Mission 1: Team! Horse Riding (단결! 말타기); Order-deciding Game: Butt Pushing (엉덩이 밀치기)	Kang Ho-dong (Chosen)
22	April 3, 2004	X-Man 7 Episode 22	MC: Yoo Jae-suk; 强(Kang) Team Leader: Kang Ho-dong; 金(Kim) Team Leader: Kim Je-dong	Kang Team: Lee Jong-su, Andy, Lee Ki-woo, Yuri, Lee Ji-hyun, Lee Hwa-sun; Kim Team: Tony An, Kim Jong-min, Choi Hyun-ho, Lexy, Ha Ri-su, Dana	Mission 2: Couple Event: New Marriages are Beautiful (신혼은 아름다워); Mission 3: Couple~ Balloon Quiz (커플~ 붕선퀴즈)	Kang Ho-dong (Active)
23	April 10, 2004	X-Man 7 Episode 23	MC: Yoo Jae-suk; 强(Kang) Team Leader: Kang Ho-dong; 金(Kim) Team Leader: Kim Je-dong	Kang Team: Lee Jong-su, Andy, Lee Ki-woo, Yuri, Lee Ji-hyun, Lee Hwa-sun; Kim Team: Tony An, Kim Jong-min, Choi Hyun-ho, Lexy, Ha Ri-su, Dana	Mission 3: Couple~ Balloon Quiz (커플~ 붕선퀴즈); Mission 4: Tongue Twisters Relay (줄줄이 말해요); Order-deciding Game: Feet Feet (다리다리)	Suspected: Lee Jong-su Kang Ho-Dong (Not Found/Succeeds)
23	Notes	A Spring Special that aired in 3 episodes.				
24	April 17, 2004	X-Man 8 Episode 24	MC: Yoo Jae-suk; 强(Kang) Team Leader: Kang Ho-dong; 金(Kim) Team Leader: Kim Je-dong	Kang Team: Shin Jung-hwan, Shin Hye-sung, Andy, Lee Hwa-sun, Chae Yeon, Kim Jae-in; Kim Team: Tim, Lee Ki-Woo, Lee Kyun, Bin, Kim Mi-yeon, Dana	Mission 1: Team! Horse Riding (단결! 말타기); Order-deciding Game: Survival Butt Pushing (서바이벌 엉덩이 밀치기); Mission 2: Balloon Quiz (붕선 퀴즈)	Shin Hye-sung (Chosen)
25	April 24, 2004	X-Man 8 Episode 25	MC: Yoo Jae-suk; 强(Kang) Team Leader: Kang Ho-dong; 金(Kim) Team Leader: Kim Je-dong	Kang Team: Shin Jung-hwan, Shin Hye-sung, Andy, Lee Hwa-sun, Chae Yeon, Kim Jae-in; Kim Team: Tim, Lee Ki-Woo, Lee Kyun, Bin, Kim Mi-yeon, Dana	Mission 2: Balloon Quiz (붕선 퀴즈); Mission 3: Couple Event: New Marriages are Beautiful (신혼은 아름다워)	Suspected: Kim Mi-yeon Shin Hye-sung (Not Found/Succeeds)
26	May 1, 2004	X-Man 9 Episode 26	MC: Yoo Jae-suk; 强(Kang) Team Leader: Kang Ho-dong; 金(Kim) Team Leader: Kim Je-dong	Kang Team: Shin Jung-hwan, Andy, Chun Jung-myung, Park Jung-ah, Lee Hwa-sun, Sunny; Kim Team: Lee Jong-su, Kim Jong-min, Tim, Won Young, Dana, Bonnie	Mission 1: Team! Horse Riding (단결! 말타기); Order-deciding Game: Survival Butt Pushing (서바이벌 엉덩이 밀치기); Mission 2: Tongue Twisters Relay (줄줄이 말해요)	Park Jung-ah (Chosen)
27	May 8, 2004	X-Man 9 Episode 27	MC: Yoo Jae-suk; 强(Kang) Team Leader: Kang Ho-dong; 金(Kim) Team Leader: Kim Je-dong	Kang Team: Shin Jung-hwan, Andy, Chun Jung-myung, Park Jung-ah, Lee Hwa-sun, Sunny; Kim Team: Lee Jong-su, Kim Jong-min, Tim, Won Young, Dana, Bonnie	Mission 3: Couple Balloon Quiz (커플 붕선퀴즈); Mission 4: Fly Frypan (날아라 프라이팬)	Suspected: Park Jung-ah (Found)
28	May 15, 2004	X-Man 10; Episode 28	MC: Yoo Jae-suk; 强(Kang) Team Leader: Kang Ho-dong; 金(Kim) Team Leader: Kim Je-dong	Kang Team: Shin Jung-hwan, Andy, Tim, Lee Ji-hyun, Bin-woo, Lee Hwa-sun; Kim Team: Lee Sung-jin, Kim Jong-min, Choi Hyun-ho, Kan Mi-yeon, Yoon Eun-hye, Yu Kyung-mi	Mission 1: Team! Horse Riding (단결! 말타기); Order-deciding Game: Butt Pushing (엉덩이 밀치기); Mission 2: Tongue Twisters Relay (줄줄이 말해요); Order-deciding Game: Of Course! (당연하지!)	Lee Sung-jin (Chosen)
29	May 22, 2004	X-Man 10; Episode 29	MC: Yoo Jae-suk; 强(Kang) Team Leader: Kang Ho-dong; 金(Kim) Team Leader: Kim Je-dong	Kang Team: Shin Jung-hwan, Andy, Tim, Lee Ji-hyun, Bin-woo, Lee Hwa-sun; Kim Team: Lee Sung-jin, Kim Jong-min, Choi Hyun-ho, Kan Mi-yeon, Yoon Eun-hye, Yu Kyung-mi	Mission 2: Tongue Twisters Relay (줄줄이 말해요); Mission 3: Couple Event: New Marriages are Beautiful (신혼은 아름다워)	Lee Sung-jin (Active)
30	May 29, 2004	X-Man 10; Episode 30	MC: Yoo Jae-suk; 强(Kang) Team Leader: Kang Ho-dong; 金(Kim) Team Leader: Kim Je-dong	Kang Team: Shin Jung-hwan, Andy, Tim, Lee Ji-hyun, Bin-woo, Lee Hwa-sun; Kim Team: Lee Sung-jin, Kim Jong-min, Choi Hyun-ho, Kan Mi-yeon, Yoon Eun-hye, Yu Kyung-mi	Mission 4: Fly Frypan (날아라 프라이팬); Mission 5: "Go" Fighting in Water (수중 고싸움)	Suspected: Shin Jung-hwan Lee Sung-jin (Not Found/Succeeds)
30	Notes	Jeju Island Special - aired in 3 episodes.				
31	June 5, 2004	X-Man 11; Episode 31	MC: Yoo Jae-suk; 强(Kang) Team Leader: Kang Ho-dong; 金(Kim) Team Leader: Kim Je-dong	Kang Team: Shin Jung-hwan, Andy, Chun Jung-myung, Chae Yeon, Lee Hwa-sun, Nam Sang-mi; Kim Team: Lee Ji-hoon, Kim Jong-min, Tim, Hwangbo, Yoon Eun-hye, Kim Jae-in	Mission 1: Team! Horse Riding (단결! 말타기); Order-deciding Game: Butt Pushing (엉덩이 밀치기); Mission 2: Fly Frypan (날아라 프라이팬)	Lee Ji-hoon (Chosen)
32	June 12, 2004	X-Man 11; Episode 32	MC: Yoo Jae-suk; 强(Kang) Team Leader: Kang Ho-dong; 金(Kim) Team Leader: Kim Je-dong	Kang Team: Shin Jung-hwan, Andy, Chun Jung-myung, Chae Yeon, Lee Hwa-sun, Nam Sang-mi; Kim Team: Lee Ji-hoon, Kim Jong-min, Tim, Hwangbo, Yoon Eun-hye, Kim Jae-in	Mission 3: Couple Event: Couples and Warriors Forever (커플장사 만만세); Mission 4: Tongue Twisters Relay (줄줄이 말해요); Order-deciding Game: Of Course! (당연하지!)	Suspected: Lee Ji-hoon (Found)
33	June 19, 2004	X-Man 12; Episode 33	MC: Yoo Jae-suk; 强(Kang) Team Leader: Kang Ho-dong; 金(Kim) Team Leader: Kim Je-dong	Kang Team: Shin Jung-hwan, Andy, Chun Jung-myung, Chu Ja-hyun, Lee Ji-hyun, Mina; Kim Team: Kim Jong-min, U-Know Yun-ho, Park Hyo-jun, Yoon Eun-hye, Eun, Kim Young-ah	Main Mission: Team! Horse Riding (단결! 말타기); Order-deciding Game: Toy Hammer Turn Turn (뿅망치 돌아돌아); Main Mission: Tongue Twisters Relay (줄줄이 말해요); Order-deciding Game: Of Course! (당연하지!)	Chun Jung-myung (Chosen)
34	June 26, 2004	X-Man 12; Episode 34	MC: Yoo Jae-suk; 强(Kang) Team Leader: Kang Ho-dong; 金(Kim) Team Leader: Kim Je-dong	Kang Team: Shin Jung-hwan, Andy, Chun Jung-myung, Chu Ja-hyun, Lee Ji-hyun, Mina; Kim Team: Kim Jong-min, U-Know Yun-ho, Park Hyo-jun, Yoon Eun-hye, Eun, Kim Young-ah	Main Mission: Tongue Twisters Relay (줄줄이 말해요); Fly Frypan (날아라 프라이팬); Run! Couple Quiz (달려라! 커플 퀴즈)	Suspected: Shin Jung-hwan Chun Jung-Meong (Not Found/Succeeds)
34	Notes	New set.				
35	July 3, 2004	X-Man 13; Episode 35	MC: Yoo Jae-suk; 强(Kang) Team Leader: Kang Ho-dong; 金(Kim) Team Leader: Kim Je-dong	Kang Team: Shin Jung-hwan, Go Young-wook, Seo Ji-won, Lee Ji-hyun, Chae Yeon, Jung Si-ah; Kim Team: Choi Hyun-ho, U-Know Yun-ho, Oh Jong-hyuk, Ha Ri-su, Hwangbo, Hong Su-ah	Main Mission: Team! Horse Riding (단결! 말타기); Order-deciding Game: Survival Handkerchief Wrestling (서바이벌 수건씨름); Fly Frypan (날아라 프라이팬)	Hwangbo (Chosen)
36	July 10, 2004	X-Man 13; Episode 36	MC: Yoo Jae-suk; 强(Kang) Team Leader: Kang Ho-dong; 金(Kim) Team Leader: Kim Je-dong	Kang Team: Shin Jung-hwan, Go Young-wook, Seo Ji-won, Lee Ji-hyun, Chae Yeon, Jung Si-ah; Kim Team: Choi Hyun-ho, U-Know Yun-ho, Oh Jong-hyuk, Ha Ri-su, Hwangbo, Hong Su-ah	Run! Couple Quiz (달려라! 커플퀴즈); Main Mission: Tongue Twisters Relay (줄줄이 말해요); Order-deciding Game: Of Course! (당연하지!)	Suspected: Hwangbo (Found)
37	July 17, 2004	X-Man 14; Episode 37	MC: Yoo Jae-suk; 强(Kang) Team Leader: Kang Ho-dong; 金(Kim) Team Leader: Kim Je-dong	Kang Team: Shin Jung-hwan, Chun Jung-myung, Lee Seung-gi, Lee Ji-hyun, Nam Sang-mi, Jung Da-hae; Kim Team: Kim Jong-kook, Kim Dong-wan, Kim Jong-min, Yoon Eun-hye, Oliver, Jang Young-ran	Main Mission: Team! Horse Riding (단결! 말타기); Order-deciding Game: Cushion Pushing (방석 밀치기); Of Course! (당연하지!)	Kim Dong-wan (Chosen)
38	July 24, 2004	X-Man 14; Episode 38	MC: Yoo Jae-suk; 强(Kang) Team Leader: Kang Ho-dong; 金(Kim) Team Leader: Kim Je-dong	Kang Team: Shin Jung-hwan, Chun Jung-myung, Lee Seung-gi, Lee Ji-hyun, Nam Sang-mi, Jung Da-hae; Kim Team: Kim Jong-kook, Kim Dong-wan, Kim Jong-min, Yoon Eun-hye, Oliver, Jang Young-ran	Of Course! (당연하지!); Fly Frypan (날아라 프라이팬); Couple Event: Couples and Warriors Forever (커플장사 만만세)	Suspected: Kim Dong-wan (Found)
39	July 31, 2004	X-Man 15; Episode 39	MC: Yoo Jae-suk; 强(Kang) Team Leader: Kang Ho-dong; 金(Kim) Team Leader: Kim Je-dong	Kang Team: Shin Jung-hwan, Kim Jung-Hoon, Lee Seung-gi, Chu Ja-hyun, Jung Mi-sun, Ha-na; Kim Team: Kim Jong-kook, Kim Jong-min, U-Know Yun-ho, Hwangbo, Yoon Eun-hye, Han Kyung-jin	Main Mission: Team! Horse Riding (단결! 말타기); Order-deciding Game: Lose Wrestling (지는 씨름); Of Course! (당연하지!)	U-Know Yun-ho (Chosen)
40	August 7, 2004	X-Man 15; Episode 40	MC: Yoo Jae-suk; 强(Kang) Team Leader: Kang Ho-dong; 金(Kim) Team Leader: Kim Je-dong	Kang Team: Shin Jung-hwan, Kim Jung-Hoon, Lee Seung-gi, Chu Ja-hyun, Jung Mi-sun, Ha-na; Kim Team: Kim Jong-kook, Kim Jong-min, U-Know Yun-ho, Hwangbo, Yoon Eun-hye, Han Kyung-jin	Of Course! (당연하지!); Couple Event: Couples and Warriors Forever (커플장사 만만세); Fly Frypan (날아라 프라이팬)	Suspected: Shin Jung-hwan U-Know Yun-ho (Not Found/Succeeds)
41	August 21, 2004	X-Man 16; Episode 41	MC: Yoo Jae-suk; 强(Kang) Team Leader: Kang Ho-dong; 金(Kim) Team Leader: Kim Je-dong	Kang Team: Shin Jung-hwan, Lee Jung, Lee Seung-gi, Lee Ji-hyun, Shin Jung-sun, Nam Sang-mi; Kim Team: Lee Jong-su, Kim Jong-min, Kim Dong-yun, Ha Ri-su, Lee Yu-ri, Choi Ja-hae	Main Mission: Team! Horse Riding (단결! 말타기); Order-deciding Game: Butt Pushing (엉덩이 밀치기); Of Course! (당연하지!)	Suspected: Lee Jong-su Kim Jong-min (Chosen/Not Found/Succeeds)
41	Notes	Special - Find X-Man in 1 episode! (2 missions)				
42	August 28, 2004	X-Man 17; Episode 42	MC: Yoo Jae-suk; 强(Kang) Team Leader: Kang Ho-dong; 金(Kim) Team Leader: Kim Je-dong	Kang Team: Shin Jung-hwan, Ryu Su-young, Lee Seung-gi, Lee Ji-hyun, Jo Jung-lin, Kim Sung-eun; Kim Team: Gong Hyung-jin, Kim Jong-kook, Lee Ju-hyun, Yoon Eun-hye, Choi Ja-hae, Jang Hae-rim	Main Mission: Team! Horse Riding (단결! 말타기); Order-deciding Game: Survival Take Off Stockings (서바이벌 양말벗기); Of Course! (당연하지!)	Yoon Eun-hye (Chosen)
43	September 4, 2004	X-Man 17; Episode 43	MC: Yoo Jae-suk; 强(Kang) Team Leader: Kang Ho-dong; 金(Kim) Team Leader: Kim Je-dong	Kang Team: Shin Jung-hwan, Ryu Su-young, Lee Seung-gi, Lee Ji-hyun, Jo Jung-lin, Kim Sung-eun; Kim Team: Gong Hyung-jin, Kim Jong-kook, Lee Ju-hyun, Yoon Eun-hye, Choi Ja-hae, Jang Hae-rim	Of Course! (당연하지!); Couple Event: Couples and Warriors Forever (커플장사 만만세); Fly Frypan (날아라 프라이팬)	Suspected: Jo Jung-lin Yoon Eun-Hye (Not Found/Succeeds)
44	September 11, 2004	X-Man 18; Episode 44	MC: Yoo Jae-suk; 强(Kang) Team Leader: Kang Ho-dong; 金(Kim) Team Leader: Kim Je-dong	Kang Team: Shin Jung-hwan, Yoon Young-su, Lee Seung-gi, Nam Sang-mi, Kim Sung-eun, Song Ji-eun; Kim Team: Kim Jang-hoon, Kim Jong-kook, Lee Ju-hyun, Lee Ji-hyun, Yoon Eun-hye, Lee Si-yeon	Main Mission: Team! Horse Riding (단결! 말타기); Order-deciding Game: Head Archery (헤드 양궁); Of Course! (당연하지!)	Shin Jung-hwan (Chosen)
45	September 18, 2004	X-Man 18; Episode 45	MC: Yoo Jae-suk; 强(Kang) Team Leader: Kang Ho-dong; 金(Kim) Team Leader: Kim Je-dong	Kang Team: Shin Jung-hwan, Yoon Young-su, Lee Seung-gi, Nam Sang-mi, Kim Sung-eun, Song Ji-eun; Kim Team: Kim Jang-hoon, Kim Jong-kook, Lee Ju-hyun, Lee Ji-hyun, Yoon Eun-hye, Lee Si-yeon	Of Course! (당연하지!); Couple Event: Couples and Warriors Forever (커플장사 만만세); Fly Frypan (날아라 프라이팬)	Suspected: Shin Jung-hwan (Found)
46	September 25, 2004	X-Man 19; Episode 46	MC: Yoo Jae-suk; 强(Kang) Team Leader: Kang Ho-dong; 金(Kim) Team Leader: Kim Je-dong	Kang Team: Shin Jung-hwan, Eun Ji-won, Lee Seung-gi, Lee Ji-hyun, Nam Sang-mi, Lee Young-eun; Kim Team: Gong Hyung-jin, Kim Jong-kook, Ji Hyun-woo, Chae Yeon, Oh Ju-eun, Lee Young-ah	Main Mission: Team! Horse Riding (단결! 말타기); Of Course! (당연하지!)	Gong Hyung-jin (Chosen)
47	October 2, 2004	X-Man 19; Episode 47	MC: Yoo Jae-suk; 强(Kang) Team Leader: Kang Ho-dong; 金(Kim) Team Leader: Kim Je-dong	Kang Team: Shin Jung-hwan, Eun Ji-won, Lee Seung-gi, Lee Ji-hyun, Nam Sang-mi, Lee Young-eun; Kim Team: Gong Hyung-jin, Kim Jong-kook, Ji Hyun-woo, Chae Yeon, Oh Ju-eun, Lee Young-ah	Of Course! (당연하지!); Couple Event: Couples and Warriors Forever (커플장사 만만세); Fly Frypan (날아라 프라이팬)	Suspected: Lee Seung-gi Gong Hyung-jin (Not Found/Succeeds)
47	Notes	Mid-Autumn Festival Special. Features the Top 5 Of Course! Kings in episode 46.				
48	October 9, 2004	Episode 48	MC: Yoo Jae-suk, Kang Ho-dong, Kim Je-dong	Various Past Guests		
48	Notes	One Year Anniversary special featuring memorable moments of the show and the Top 10 Guests. Last episode before moving to Good Sunday.				

=== Good Sunday ===
- Aired: October 10, 2004 – October 29, 2006

#	Original Airdate	X-Man # / Episode #	Hosts	Guests	Missions	X-Man
49	October 10, 2004	X-Man 20; Episode 49	MC: Yoo Jae-suk; 强(Kang) Team Leader: Kang Ho-dong; 金(Kim) Team Leader: Kim Je-dong	Kang Team: Ji Sang-ryul, Eric, Shin Hye-sung, Andy, Lee Ji-hyun, Lee Young-eun, Oh Yoon-ah; Kim Team: Kim Jong-kook, Kim Dong-wan, Lee Min-woo, Jun Jin, Yoon Eun-hye, Oh Ju-eun, Lee Yoo-ri	Main Mission: Team! Horse Riding (단결! 말타기); Order-deciding Game: Butt Pushing (엉덩이 밀치기); Of Course! (당연하지!)	Eric (Chosen)
50	October 17, 2004	X-Man 20; Episode 50	MC: Yoo Jae-suk; 强(Kang) Team Leader: Kang Ho-dong; 金(Kim) Team Leader: Kim Je-dong	Kang Team: Ji Sang-ryul, Eric, Shin Hye-sung, Andy, Lee Ji-hyun, Lee Young-eun, Oh Yoon-ah; Kim Team: Kim Jong-kook, Kim Dong-wan, Lee Min-woo, Jun Jin, Yoon Eun-hye, Oh Ju-eun, Lee Yoo-ri	Of Course! (당연하지!); Couple Event: Couples and Warriors Forever (커플장사 만만세)	Suspected: Eric (Found)
50	Notes	First X-Man after moving to Good Sunday. Autumn Special.				
51	October 24, 2004	X-Man 21; Episode 51	MC: Yoo Jae-suk; 强(Kang) Team Leader: Kang Ho-dong; 金(Kim) Team Leader: Kim Je-dong	Kang Team: Shin Jung-hwan, Tim, Lee Seung-gi, Lee Ji-hyun, Nam Sang-mi, Park Seul-ki; Kim Team: Kim Jong-kook, Tony An, Jung Hyung-don, Ryeo-won, Ayumi, Su-jin	Main Mission: Team! Horse Riding (단결! 말타기); Order-deciding Game: Hand Push Over (손바닥 밀치기); Of Course! (당연하지!)	Tim (Chosen)
52	October 31, 2004	X-Man 21; Episode 52	MC: Yoo Jae-suk; 强(Kang) Team Leader: Kang Ho-dong; 金(Kim) Team Leader: Kim Je-dong	Kang Team: Shin Jung-hwan, Tim, Lee Seung-gi, Lee Ji-hyun, Nam Sang-mi, Park Seul-ki; Kim Team: Kim Jong-kook, Tony An, Jung Hyung-don, Ryeo-won, Ayumi, Su-jin	Of Course! (당연하지!); Couple Event: Couples and Warriors Forever (커플장사 만만세); Fly Frypan (날아라 프라이팬)	Suspected: Shin Jung-hwan Tim (Not Found/Succeeds)
53	November 7, 2004	X-Man 22; Episode 53	MC: Yoo Jae-suk; 强(Kang) Team Leader: Kang Ho-dong; 金(Kim) Team Leader: Kim Je-dong	Kang Team: Shin Jung-hwan, Lee Ju-hyun, MC Mong, Lee Seung-gi, Lee So-ra, Lee Ji-hyun, Nam Sang-mi; Kim Team: Kim Jong-kook, Park Jun-gyu, Lee Jong-su, Ji Hyun-woo, Chae Yeon, Yang Mi-ra, Gong Hyun-ju	Main Mission: Team! Horse Riding (단결! 말타기); Order-deciding Game: Butt Pushing (엉덩이 밀치기); Of Course! (당연하지!)	Kim Je-dong (Chosen)
54	November 14, 2004	X-Man 22; Episode 54	MC: Yoo Jae-suk; 强(Kang) Team Leader: Kang Ho-dong; 金(Kim) Team Leader: Kim Je-dong	Kang Team: Shin Jung-hwan, Lee Ju-hyun, MC Mong, Lee Seung-gi, Lee So-ra, Lee Ji-hyun, Nam Sang-mi; Kim Team: Kim Jong-kook, Park Jun-gyu, Lee Jong-su, Ji Hyun-woo, Chae Yeon, Yang Mi-ra, Gong Hyun-ju	Of Course! (당연하지!); Couple Event: Couples and Warriors Forever (커플장사 만만세); Fly Frypan (날아라 프라이팬)	Suspected: MC Mong Kim Je-dong (Not Found/Succeeds)
55	November 21, 2004	X-Man 23; Episode 55	MC: Yoo Jae-suk; 强(Kang) Team Leader: Kang Ho-dong; 金(Kim) Team Leader: Kim Je-dong	Kang Team: Shin Jung-hwan, Choi Hyun-ho, Lee Seung-gi, Micky Yu-chun, Oh Seung-eun, Lee Ji-hyun, Jo Jung-lin; Kim Team: Kim Jong-kook, Park Sang-min, Tony An, U-Know Yun-ho, Yoon Eun-hye, Ryeo-won, Seo Yu-jung	Main Mission: Team! Horse Riding (단결! 말타기); Order-deciding Game: Fly Super Board (날아라 슈퍼보드); Of Course! (당연하지!)	Kim Jong-Kook (Chosen)
56	November 28, 2004	X-Man 23; Episode 56	MC: Yoo Jae-suk; 强(Kang) Team Leader: Kang Ho-dong; 金(Kim) Team Leader: Kim Je-dong	Kang Team: Shin Jung-hwan, Choi Hyun-ho, Lee Seung-gi, Micky Yu-chun, Oh Seung-eun, Lee Ji-hyun, Jo Jung-lin; Kim Team: Kim Jong-kook, Park Sang-min, Tony An, U-Know Yun-ho, Yoon Eun-hye, Ryeo-won, Seo Yu-jung	Of Course! (당연하지!); Couple Event: Couples and Warriors Forever (커플장사 만만세); Fly Frypan (날아라 프라이팬)	Suspected: Park Sang-min Kim Jong-kook (Not Found/Succeeds)
56	Notes	Kim Je-dong's last show.				
57	December 5, 2004	X-Man 24; Episode 57	MC: Yoo Jae-suk; 강(Kang) Team Leader: Kang Ho-dong; 공(Gong) Team Leader: Gong Hyung-jin	Kang Team: Shin Jung-hwan, Eric, Andy, Chun Jung-myung, Lee Jin, Lee Ji-hyun, Kim Jung-hwa; Gong Team: Kim Jong-kook, Kim Dong-wan, Shin Hye-sung, Kim Jong-min, Yoon Eun-hye, Hwangbo, Chae Min-seo	Mission 1: Team! Horse Riding (단결! 말타기); Order-deciding Game: Butt Pushing (엉덩이 밀치기); Mission 2: Of Course! (당연하지!)	Kang Ho-Dong (Chosen)
58	December 12, 2004	X-Man 24; Episode 58	MC: Yoo Jae-suk; 강(Kang) Team Leader: Kang Ho-dong; 공(Gong) Team Leader: Gong Hyung-jin	Kang Team: Shin Jung-hwan, Eric, Andy, Chun Jung-myung, Lee Jin, Lee Ji-hyun, Kim Jung-hwa; Gong Team: Kim Jong-kook, Kim Dong-wan, Shin Hye-sung, Kim Jong-min, Yoon Eun-hye, Hwangbo, Chae Min-seo	Mission 2: Of Course! (당연하지!); Mission 3: Couple Event: Couples and Warriors Forever (커플장사 만만세); Mission 4: Tongue Twisters Relay (줄줄이 말해요)	Suspected: Eric Kang Ho-dong (Not Found/Succeeds)
58	Notes	Special! Find the Best X-Man. (Previous X-Men return to find the best X-Man.) Gong Hyung-jin becomes team leader of Gong Team, replacing Kim Team.				
59	December 19, 2004	X-Man 25; Episode 59	MC: Yoo Jae-suk; 강(Kang) Team Leader: Kang Ho-dong; 공(Gong) Team Leader: Gong Hyung-jin	Kang Team: Shin Jung-hwan, Park Jun-gyu, Eun Ji-won, Lee Seung-gi, So Yoo-jin, Lee Ji-jyun, Jo Jung-rin; Gong Team: Kim Jong-kook, Rimario, Kim Jong-min, Kim Jeong-hoon, Kim Won-hee, Yoon Eun-hye, Seo In-young	Main Mission: Team! Horse Riding (단결! 말타기); Order-deciding Game: Hand Push Over (손바닥 밀치기); Of Course! (당연하지!)	Kim Won-hee (Chosen)
60	December 26, 2004	X-Man 25; Episode 60	MC: Yoo Jae-suk; 강(Kang) Team Leader: Kang Ho-dong; 공(Gong) Team Leader: Gong Hyung-jin	Kang Team: Shin Jung-hwan, Park Jun-gyu, Eun Ji-won, Lee Seung-gi, So Yoo-jin, Lee Ji-jyun, Jo Jung-rin; Gong Team: Kim Jong-kook, Rimario, Kim Jong-min, Kim Jeong-hoon, Kim Won-hee, Yoon Eun-hye, Seo In-young	Of Course! (당연하지!); Couple Event: Couples and Warriors Forever (커플장사 만만세); Fly Frypan (날아라 프라이팬)	Suspected: Lee Seung-gi Kim Won-hee (Not Found/Succeeds)
60	Notes	Christmas Special.				
61	January 2, 2005	X-Man 26; Episode 61	MC: Yoo Jae-suk; 강(Kang) Team Leader: Kang Ho-dong; 공(Gong) Team Leader: Gong Hyung-jin	Kang Team: Shin Jung-hwan, Im Ho, Haeng Sung, Lee Seung-gi, Yu Min, Chu Ja-hyun, Lee Ji-hyun; Gong Team: Kim Jong-kook, Tony An, Kim Jong-min, Jung Jun-ha, Chae Yeon, Yoon Eun-hye, Hong Su-ah	Main Mission: Team! Horse Riding (단결! 말타기); Order-deciding Game: Lose Wrestling (지는씨름); Of Course! (당연하지!)	Chu Ja-hyun (Chosen)
62	January 9, 2005	X-Man 26; Episode 62	MC: Yoo Jae-suk; 강(Kang) Team Leader: Kang Ho-dong; 공(Gong) Team Leader: Gong Hyung-jin	Kang Team: Shin Jung-hwan, Im Ho, Haeng Sung, Lee Seung-gi, Yu Min, Chu Ja-hyun, Lee Ji-hyun; Gong Team: Kim Jong-kook, Tony An, Kim Jong-min, Jung Jun-ha, Chae Yeon, Yoon Eun-hye, Hong Su-ah	Of Course! (당연하지!); Couple Event: Couples and Warriors Forever (커플장사 만만세); Fly Frypan (날아라 프라이팬)	Suspected: Lee Seung-gi Chu Ja-hyun (Not Found/Succeeds)
62	Notes	New Year's Special.				
63	January 16, 2005	X-Man 27; Episode 63	MC: Yoo Jae-suk; 강(Kang) Team Leader: Kang Ho-dong; 공(Gong) Team Leader: Gong Hyung-jin	Kang Team: Shin Jung-hwan, Go Young-wook, Andy, Lee Seung-gi, Lee Jin, Kim Shin-young, Lee Ji-hyun; Gong Team: Hong Kyung-min, Brian, Kim Jong-min, Ohn Ju-wan, Chae Yeon, Jang Yun-jung, Shin Eun-sung	Main Mission: Team! Horse Riding (단결! 말타기); Order-deciding Game: Indian Dance (인디언 댄스); Of Course! (당연하지!)	Lee Seung-gi (Chosen)
64	January 23, 2005	X-Man 27; Episode 64	MC: Yoo Jae-suk; 강(Kang) Team Leader: Kang Ho-dong; 공(Gong) Team Leader: Gong Hyung-jin	Kang Team: Shin Jung-hwan, Go Young-wook, Andy, Lee Seung-gi, Lee Jin, Kim Shin-young, Lee Ji-hyun; Gong Team: Hong Kyung-min, Brian, Kim Jong-min, Ohn Ju-wan, Chae Yeon, Jang Yun-jung, Shin Eun-sung	Of Course! (당연하지!); Couple Event: Couples and Warriors Forever (커플장사 만만세); Team! Feet Feet (단결! 다리다리)	Suspected: Andy Lee Seung-gi (Not Found/Succeeds)
65	January 30, 2005	X-Man 28; Episode 65	MC: Yoo Jae-suk; 강(Kang) Team Leader: Kang Ho-dong; 공(Gong) Team Leader: Gong Hyung-jin	Kang Team: Shin Jung-hwan, Park Jun-hyung, Danny Ahn, Kim Young-chul, Lee Jin, Chae Yeon, Yu Min; Gong Team: Kim Jong-min, Son Ho-young, Kim Tae-woo, Jung Jun-ha, Yoon Eun-hye, Yang Mi-ra, Han Young	Main Mission: Team! Horse Riding (단결! 말타기); Order-deciding Game: Hand Push Over (쭈글쭈글 손바닥 밀치기); Of Course! (당연하지!)	Danny Ahn (Chosen)
66	February 6, 2005	X-Man 28; Episode 66	MC: Yoo Jae-suk; 강(Kang) Team Leader: Kang Ho-dong; 공(Gong) Team Leader: Gong Hyung-jin	Kang Team: Shin Jung-hwan, Park Jun-hyung, Danny Ahn, Kim Young-chul, Lee Jin, Chae Yeon, Yu Min; Gong Team: Kim Jong-min, Son Ho-young, Kim Tae-woo, Jung Jun-ha, Yoon Eun-hye, Yang Mi-ra, Han Young	Of Course! (당연하지!); Couple Event: Couples and Warriors Forever (커플장사 만만세)	Suspected: Danny Ahn (Found)
66	Notes	Lunar New Years' Special. Special appearance by Lee Hyo-ri in episode 66.				
67	February 13, 2005	X-Man 29; Episode 67	MC: Yoo Jae-suk; 강(Kang) Team Leader: Kang Ho-dong; 공(Gong) Team Leader: Gong Hyung-jin	Kang Team: Shin Jung-hwan, Ahn Jae-hwan, Lee Jung, Ohn Ju-wan, Lee Jin, Lee Ji-hyun, Kim Ji-woo; Gong Team: Lee Moon-sik, Yoon Taec, Kim Jong-min, Fany, Yoon Eun-hye, Chae Yeon, Choi Yeo-jin	Main Mission: Team! Horse Riding (단결! 말타기); Order-deciding Game: Stretch Your Legs (다리다리 쭉쭉); Of Course! (당연하지!)	Lee Ji-hyun (Chosen)
68	February 20, 2005	X-Man 29; Episode 68	MC: Yoo Jae-suk; 강(Kang) Team Leader: Kang Ho-dong; 공(Gong) Team Leader: Gong Hyung-jin	Kang Team: Shin Jung-hwan, Ahn Jae-hwan, Lee Jung, Ohn Ju-wan, Lee Jin, Lee Ji-hyun, Kim Ji-woo; Gong Team: Lee Moon-sik, Yoon Taec, Kim Jong-min, Fany, Yoon Eun-hye, Chae Yeon, Choi Yeo-jin	Of Course! (당연하지!); Couple Event: Couples and Warriors Forever (커플장사 만만세); Team! Catch the Tail (단결! 꼬리잡기)	Suspected: Lee Ji-hyun (Found)
69	February 27, 2005	X-Man 30; Episode 69	MC: Yoo Jae-suk; 강(Kang) Team Leader: Kang Ho-dong; 공(Gong) Team Leader: Gong Hyung-jin	Kang Team: Shin Jung-hwan, Lee Byung-jin, Lee Ju-hyun, Lee Seung-gi, Lee Jin, Park Jung-ah, Seo Min-jung; Gong Team: Lee Moon-sik, Andy, Lee Jong-gyu, Haeng Sung, Yoon Eun-hye, Bin-woo, Jo Min-ah	Main Mission: Team! Horse Riding (단결! 말타기); Order-deciding Game: Butt Pushing (엉덩이 밀치기); Of Course! (당연하지!)	Lee Moon-sik (Chosen)
70	March 6, 2005	X-Man 30; Episode 70	MC: Yoo Jae-suk; 강(Kang) Team Leader: Kang Ho-dong; 공(Gong) Team Leader: Gong Hyung-jin	Kang Team: Shin Jung-hwan, Lee Byung-jin, Lee Ju-hyun, Lee Seung-gi, Lee Jin, Park Jung-ah, Seo Min-jung; Gong Team: Lee Moon-sik, Andy, Lee Jong-gyu, Haeng Sung, Yoon Eun-hye, Bin-woo, Jo Min-ah	Of Course! (당연하지!); Couple Event: Couples and Warriors Forever (커플장사 만만세); Team! Chicken Fight (단결! 닭싸움)	Suspected: Lee Moon-sik (Found)
71	March 13, 2005	X-Man 31; Episode 71	MC: Yoo Jae-suk; 강(Kang) Team Leader: Kang Ho-dong; 공(Gong) Team Leader: Gong Hyung-jin	Kang Team: Shin Jung-hwan, Hong Kyung-min, Jung Man-ho, Jae-woo, Hwangbo, Lee Ji-hyun, Haeng-ryang; Gong Team: Park Jun-gyu, Jun Jin, Tablo, Ohn Ju-Wan, Yoon Eun-hye, U;Nee, Choi Yeo-jin	Main Mission: Team! Horse Riding (단결! 말타기); Order-deciding Game: Hand Push Over (쭈글쭈글 손바닥 밀치기); Of Course! (당연하지!)	Park Jun-gyu (Chosen)
72	March 20, 2005	X-Man 31; Episode 72	MC: Yoo Jae-suk; 강(Kang) Team Leader: Kang Ho-dong; 공(Gong) Team Leader: Gong Hyung-jin	Kang Team: Shin Jung-hwan, Hong Kyung-min, Jung Man-ho, Jae-woo, Hwangbo, Lee Ji-hyun, Haeng-ryang; Gong Team: Park Jun-gyu, Jun Jin, Tablo, Ohn Ju-Wan, Yoon Eun-hye, U;Nee, Choi Yeo-jin	Of Course! (당연하지!); Couple Event: Couples and Warriors Forever (커플장사 만만세)	Suspected: Park Jun-gyu (Found)
73	March 27, 2005	X-Man 32; Episode 73	MC: Yoo Jae-suk; 강(Kang) Team Leader: Kang Ho-dong; 공(Gong) Team Leader: Gong Hyung-jin	Kang Team: Shin Jung-hwan, Eun Ji-won, Kim Tae-hyun, Tei, Lee Jin, Chae Yeon, Yu Min; Gong Team: Lee Byung-jin, Jo Sung-mo, Tablo, Yu Bin, Yoon Eun-hye, Kim Mi-yeon, Choi Yeo-jin	Main Mission: Team! Horse Riding (단결! 말타기); Order-deciding Game: Plastic Bucket Hand Pushing (고무대야 손바닥 밀치기); Of Course! (당연하지!)	Jo Sung-mo (Chosen)
74	April 3, 2005	X-Man 32/Episode 74	MC: Yoo Jae-suk; 강(Kang) Team Leader: Kang Ho-dong; 공(Gong) Team Leader: Gong Hyung-jin	Kang Team: Shin Jung-hwan, Eun Ji-won, Kim Tae-hyun, Tei, Lee Jin, Chae Yeon, Yu Min; Gong Team: Lee Byung-jin, Jo Sung-mo, Tablo, Yu Bin, Yoon Eun-hye, Kim Mi-yeon, Choi Yeo-jin	Of Course! (당연하지!); Couple Event: Couples and Warriors Forever (커플장사 만만세); Team! Hula Hoop (단결! 훌라후프)	Suspected: Lee Byung-jin Jo Sung-mo (Not Found/Succeeds)
75	April 10, 2005	X-Man 33; Episode 75	MC: Yoo Jae-suk; 강(Kang) Team Leader: Kang Ho-dong; 공(Gong) Team Leader: Gong Hyung-jin	Kang Team: Shin Jung-hwan, Park Sang-min, Andy, Kim Tae-hyun, Lee Jin, Lee Ji-hyun, Seo Min-jung; Gong Team: Bae Ki-sung, Park Jun-suk, Tablo, Kim Ki-wook, Yoon Eun-hye, Park Jung-ah, U;Nee	Main Mission: Team! Horse Riding (단결! 말타기); Order-deciding Game: Butt Push Koong (엉덩이 쿵); Of Course! (당연하지!)	Tablo (Chosen)
76	April 17, 2005	X-Man 33; Episode 76	MC: Yoo Jae-suk; 강(Kang) Team Leader: Kang Ho-dong; 공(Gong) Team Leader: Gong Hyung-jin	Kang Team: Shin Jung-hwan, Park Sang-min, Andy, Kim Tae-hyun, Lee Jin, Lee Ji-hyun, Seo Min-jung; Gong Team: Bae Ki-sung, Park Jun-suk, Tablo, Kim Ki-wook, Yoon Eun-hye, Park Jung-ah, U;Nee	Of Course! (당연하지!); Couple Event: Couples and Warriors Forever (커플장사 만만세)	Suspected: Tablo (Found)
77	April 24, 2005	X-Man 34; Episode 77	MC: Yoo Jae-suk; 강(Kang) Team Leader: Kang Ho-dong; 공(Gong) Team Leader: Gong Hyung-jin	Kang Team: Shin Jung-hwan, Lee Min-woo, Yoon Taec, Lee Seung-gi, Kim Won-hee, Lee Jin, Lee Ji-hyun; Gong Team: Park Jun-gyu, Jung Jun-ha, Sung Si-kyung, Tablo, Park Kyung-lim, Yoon Eun-hye, Nam Sang-mi	Main Mission: Team! Horse Riding (단결! 말타기); Order-deciding Game: Hand Push Over (쭈글쭈글 손바닥 밀치기); Of Course! (당연하지!)	Lee Min-woo (Chosen)
78	May 1, 2005	X-Man 34; Episode 78	MC: Yoo Jae-suk; 강(Kang) Team Leader: Kang Ho-dong; 공(Gong) Team Leader: Gong Hyung-jin	Kang Team: Shin Jung-hwan, Lee Min-woo, Yoon Taec, Lee Seung-gi, Kim Won-hee, Lee Jin, Lee Ji-hyun; Gong Team: Park Jun-gyu, Jung Jun-ha, Sung Si-kyung, Tablo, Park Kyung-lim, Yoon Eun-hye, Nam Sang-mi	Of Course! (당연하지!); Couple Event: Couples and Warriors Forever (커플장사 만만세)	Suspected: Lee Min-woo (Found)
78	Notes	Best of the Best Special. Featured Best of Of Course! in episode 77. Last show of Gong Hyung-jin.				
79	May 8, 2005	X-Man 35; Episode 79	MC: Yoo Jae-suk; 강(Kang) Team Leader: Kang Ho-dong; 박(Park) Team Leader: Park Kyung-lim	Kang Team: Kim Young-chul, Choi Jung-won, Tei, Seo Dong-won, Lee Jin, Jun Hye-bin, Hyun Young; Park Team: Kim Jang-hoon, Lee Byung-jin, Jung Jun-ha, Lee Jae-won, Ohn Ju-wan, Yu-ri, Yoon Eun-hye	Main Mission: Team! Feet Feet (단결! 다리다리); Order-deciding Game: Frog Butt Pushover (개구리 엉덩이 밀치기); Of Course! (당연하지!)	Choi Jung-won (Chosen)
80	May 15, 2005	X-Man 35; Episode 80	MC: Yoo Jae-suk; 강(Kang) Team Leader: Kang Ho-dong; 박(Park) Team Leader: Park Kyung-lim	Kang Team: Kim Young-chul, Choi Jung-won, Tei, Seo Dong-won, Lee Jin, Jun Hye-bin, Hyun Young; Park Team: Kim Jang-hoon, Lee Byung-jin, Jung Jun-ha, Lee Jae-won, Ohn Ju-wan, Yu-ri, Yoon Eun-hye	Of Course! (당연하지!); Couple Event: Couples and Warriors Forever (커플장사 만만세)	Suspected: Choi Jung-won (Found)
80	Notes	Park Kyung-lim becomes leader of Park Team, replacing Gong Team.				
81	May 22, 2005	X-Man 36; Episode 81	MC: Yoo Jae-suk; 강(Kang) Team Leader: Kang Ho-dong; 박(Park) Team Leader: Park Kyung-lim	Kang Team: Park Sang-min, Ahn Jae-hwan, Eun Ji-won, Ha-ha, Lee Jin, Lee Ji-hyun, Gong Hyun-ju; Park Team: Park Jun-gyu, Lee Byung-jin, Shin Hye-sung, Lee Jae-won, Jung Chul, Ock Ju-hyun, Yoon Eun-hye	Warm-Up Game: Lose Wrestling (지는 씨름); Main Mission: Team! Chicken Fight (단결! 닭싸움); Of Course! (당연하지!)	Shin Hye-sung (Chosen)
82	May 29, 2005	X-Man 36; Episode 82	MC: Yoo Jae-suk; 강(Kang) Team Leader: Kang Ho-dong; 박(Park) Team Leader: Park Kyung-lim	Kang Team: Park Sang-min, Ahn Jae-hwan, Eun Ji-won, Ha-ha, Lee Jin, Lee Ji-hyun, Gong Hyun-ju; Park Team: Park Jun-gyu, Lee Byung-jin, Shin Hye-sung, Lee Jae-won, Jung Chul, Ock Ju-hyun, Yoon Eun-hye	Of Course! (당연하지!); Couple Event: Couples and Warriors Forever (커플장사 만만세)	Suspected: Shin Hye-sung (Found)
83	June 5, 2005	X-Man 37; Episode 83	MC: Yoo Jae-suk; 강(Kang) Team Leader: Kang Ho-dong; 박(Park) Team Leader: Park Kyung-lim	Kang Team: Kim Young-chul, MC Mong, Ha-ha, Lee Min-ki, Yu-ri, Yang Mi-ra, Byul; Park Team: Kim Jung-min, Lee Byung-jin, Lee Jae-won, Kang Doo, Tim, Yoon Eun-hye, Ayumi	Warm-Up Game: Frog Butt Pushover (개구리 엉덩이 밀치기); Main Mission: Team! Chicken Fight (단결! 닭싸움); Of Course! (당연하지!)	MC Mong (Chosen)
84	June 12, 2005	X-Man 37; Episode 84	MC: Yoo Jae-suk; 강(Kang) Team Leader: Kang Ho-dong; 박(Park) Team Leader: Park Kyung-lim	Kang Team: Kim Young-chul, MC Mong, Ha-ha, Lee Min-ki, Yu-ri, Yang Mi-ra, Byul; Park Team: Kim Jung-min, Lee Byung-jin, Lee Jae-won, Kang Doo, Tim, Yoon Eun-hye, Ayumi	Of Course! (당연하지!); Couple Event: Couples and Warriors Forever (커플장사 만만세)	Suspected: Tim MC Mong (Not Found/Succeeds)
85	June 19, 2005	X-Man 38; Episode 85	MC: Yoo Jae-suk; 강(Kang) Team Leader: Kang Ho-dong; 박(Park) Team Leader: Park Kyung-lim	Kang Team: Ji Sang-ryul, Ha-ha, Lee Min-ki, Ru, Lee Jin, Yang Mi-ra, Kang Jung-hwa; Park Team: Park Sang-myun, Lee Byung-jin, Sung Si-kyung, Lee Jae-won, Lee Chun-hee, Yoon Eun-hye, Ha Yu-sun	Warm-Up Game: Lose Wrestling (지는 씨름); Main Mission: Team! Chicken Fight (단결! 닭싸움); Of Course! (당연하지!)	Sung Si-kyung (Chosen)
86	June 26, 2005	X-Man 38; Episode 86	MC: Yoo Jae-suk; 강(Kang) Team Leader: Kang Ho-dong; 박(Park) Team Leader: Park Kyung-lim	Kang Team: Ji Sang-ryul, Ha-ha, Lee Min-ki, Ru, Lee Jin, Yang Mi-ra, Kang Jung-hwa; Park Team: Park Sang-myun, Lee Byung-jin, Sung Si-kyung, Lee Jae-won, Lee Chun-hee, Yoon Eun-hye, Ha Yu-sun	Of Course! (당연하지!); Couple Event: Couples and Warriors Forever (커플장사 만만세)	Suspected: Sung Si-kyung (Found)
87	July 3, 2005	X-Man 39; Episode 87	MC: Yoo Jae-suk; 강(Kang) Team Leader: Kang Ho-dong; 박(Park) Team Leader: Park Kyung-lim	Kang Team: Ji Sang-ryul, Jo Yeon-woo, Ha-ha, Jo Kei-hyung, Lee Jin, Yu-ri, Lee Su-kyung; Park Team: Kim Jang-hoon, Bae Ki-sung, Lee Min-woo, Choi Kyu-hwan, Kim Hyun-joong, Yoon Eun-hye, Kill-Gun	Warm-Up Game: Catch the Gomusin (고무신 잡기); Main Mission: Team! Chicken Fight (단결! 닭싸움); Of Course! (당연하지!)	Kim Jang-hoon (Chosen)
88	July 10, 2005	X-Man 39; Episode 88	MC: Yoo Jae-suk; 강(Kang) Team Leader: Kang Ho-dong; 박(Park) Team Leader: Park Kyung-lim	Kang Team: Ji Sang-ryul, Jo Yeon-woo, Ha-ha, Jo Kei-hyung, Lee Jin, Yu-ri, Lee Su-kyung; Park Team: Kim Jang-hoon, Bae Ki-sung, Lee Min-woo, Choi Kyu-hwan, Kim Hyun-joong, Yoon Eun-hye, Kill-Gun	Of Course! (당연하지!); Couple Event: Couples and Warriors Forever (커플장사 만만세)	Suspected: Bae Ki-sung Kim Jang-hoon (Not Found/Succeeds)
89	July 17, 2005	X-Man 40; Episode 89	MC: Yoo Jae-suk; 강(Kang) Team Leader: Kang Ho-dong; 박(Park) Team Leader: Park Kyung-lim	Kang Team: Ji Sang-ryul, Lee Ji-hoon, Shin Hye-sung, Lee Min-ki, Lee Jin, Hwangbo, Ha Ju-hee; Park Team: Park Jun-gyu, Kim Jong-kook, Andy, Ha-ha, Kim Ji-seok, Yoon Eun-hye, Kim Eun-ju	Warm-Up Game: Hands Pushover (쭈글쭈글 손바닥 밀치기); Main Mission 1: Team! "Go" Fighting (단결! 고싸움); Of Course! (당연하지!)	Lee Ji-hoon (Chosen)
90	July 25, 2005	X-Man 40; Episode 90	MC: Yoo Jae-suk; 강(Kang) Team Leader: Kang Ho-dong; 박(Park) Team Leader: Park Kyung-lim	Kang Team: Ji Sang-ryul, Lee Ji-hoon, Shin Hye-sung, Lee Min-ki, Lee Jin, Hwangbo, Ha Ju-hee; Park Team: Park Jun-gyu, Kim Jong-kook, Andy, Ha-ha, Kim Ji-seok, Yoon Eun-hye, Kim Eun-ju	Of Course! (당연하지!); Warm-Up Game: Team! Water Splash (단결! 물튀기기); Main Mission 2: Relay Take Off Stockings (릴레이 양말벗기); Couple Event: Couples and Warriors Forever (커플장사 만만세)	Lee Ji-hoon (Active)
91	July 31, 2005	X-Man 40; Episode 91	MC: Yoo Jae-suk; 강(Kang) Team Leader: Kang Ho-dong; 박(Park) Team Leader: Park Kyung-lim	Kang Team: Ji Sang-ryul, Lee Ji-hoon, Shin Hye-sung, Lee Min-ki, Lee Jin, Hwangbo, Ha Ju-hee; Park Team: Park Jun-gyu, Kim Jong-kook, Andy, Ha-ha, Kim Ji-seok, Yoon Eun-hye, Kim Eun-ju	Couple Event: Couples and Warriors Forever (커플장사 만만세)	Suspected: Andy Lee Ji-hoon (Not Found/Succeeds)
91	Notes	Overseas Special Part 1, Summer Special: Pattaya, Thailand - aired in 3 episodes. Episode 91 was shortened to only 45 mins long.				
92	August 7, 2005	X-Man 41; Episode 92	MC: Yoo Jae-suk; 강(Kang) Team Leader: Kang Ho-dong; 박(Park) Team Leader: Park Kyung-lim	Kang Team: Ji Sang-ryul, Sung Si-kyung, Kim Wu-ju, Kim Hyung-jun, Lee Jin, Seo Ji-young, Chun-mu Stephanie; Park Team: Kim Jong-kook, Choi Kyu-hwan, No Yu-min, Tim, Kim Hyun-joong, Yoon Eun-hye, Shin Min-hee	Warm-Up Game: Catch the Gomusin (고무신 잡기); Main Mission: Team! Chicken Fight (단결! 닭싸움); Of Course! (당연하지!)	Park Kyung-lim (Chosen)
93	August 14, 2005	X-Man 41; Episode 93	MC: Yoo Jae-suk; 강(Kang) Team Leader: Kang Ho-dong; 박(Park) Team Leader: Park Kyung-lim	Kang Team: Ji Sang-ryul, Sung Si-kyung, Kim Wu-ju, Kim Hyung-jun, Lee Jin, Seo Ji-young, Chun-mu Stephanie; Park Team: Kim Jong-kook, Choi Kyu-hwan, No Yu-min, Tim, Kim Hyun-joong, Yoon Eun-hye, Shin Min-hee	Of Course! (당연하지!); Couple Event: Couples and Warriors Forever (커플장사 만만세)	Suspected: Ji Sang-ryul Park Kyung-lim (Not found/Succeeds)
94	August 21, 2005	X-Man 42; Episode 94	MC: Yoo Jae-suk; 강(Kang) Team Leader: Kang Ho-dong; 박(Park) Team Leader: Park Kyung-lim	Kang Team: Park Jun-gyu, Ji Sang-ryul, Micky Yu-chun, Xiah Jun-su, Hwangbo, Kang Eun-bi, Chun-mu Stephanie; Park Team: Kim Jong-kook, Park Myung-su, Ha-ha, U-Know Yun-ho, Kim Hyun-joong, Yoon Eun-hye, Lee Ji-hye	Warm-Up Game: Hands Pushover (쭈글쭈글 손바닥 밀치기); Of Course! (당연하지!)	U-Know Yun-ho (Chosen)
95	August 28, 2005	X-Man 42; Episode 95	MC: Yoo Jae-suk; 강(Kang) Team Leader: Kang Ho-dong; 박(Park) Team Leader: Park Kyung-lim	Kang Team: Park Jun-gyu, Ji Sang-ryul, Micky Yu-chun, Xiah Jun-su, Hwangbo, Kang Eun-bi, Chun-mu Stephanie; Park Team: Kim Jong-kook, Park Myung-su, Ha-ha, U-Know Yun-ho, Kim Hyun-joong, Yoon Eun-hye, Lee Ji-hye	Of Course! (당연하지!); Couple Event: Couples and Warriors Forever (커플장사 만만세)	Suspected: Micky Yu-chun U-Know Yun-ho (Not Found/Succeeds)
96	September 4, 2005	X-Man 43; Episode 96	MC: Yoo Jae-suk; 강(Kang) Team Leader: Kang Ho-dong; 박(Park) Team Leader: Park Kyung-lim	Kang Team: Gu Jun-yup, Jung Man-ho, Baek Bong-ki, Kim Hyun-joong, Lee Jin, Jun Hye-bin, Jang Yun-jung; Park Team: Kim Jong-kook, Ji Sang-ryul, Ha-ha, Jung Eui-chul, Kim Hyung-jun, Yoon Eun-hye, Kang Eun-bi	Warm-Up Game: Lose Wrestling (지는 씨름); Main Mission: Team! Catch the Tail (단결! 꼬리잡기); Of Course! (당연하지!)	Lee Jin (Chosen)
97	September 11, 2005	X-Man 43; Episode 97	MC: Yoo Jae-suk; 강(Kang) Team Leader: Kang Ho-dong; 박(Park) Team Leader: Park Kyung-lim	Kang Team: Gu Jun-yup, Jung Man-ho, Baek Bong-ki, Kim Hyun-joong, Lee Jin, Jun Hye-bin, Jang Yun-jung; Park Team: Kim Jong-kook, Ji Sang-ryul, Ha-ha, Jung Eui-chul, Kim Hyung-jun, Yoon Eun-hye, Kang Eun-bi	Of Course! (당연하지!); Couple Event: Couples and Warriors Forever (커플장사 만만세)	Suspected: Ji Sang-ryul Lee Jin (Not Found/Succeeds)
98	September 18, 2005	X-Man 44; Episode 98	MC: Yoo Jae-suk; 강(Kang) Team Leader: Kang Ho-dong; 박(Park) Team Leader: Park Kyung-lim	Kang Team: Ji Sang-ryul, Jang Wu-hyuk, Shin Hye-sung, KCM, Lee Ah-hyun, Hwangbo, Chun-mu Stephanie; Park Team: Gu Jun-yup, Park Myung-su, Kim Jong-kook, Ha-ha, Kim Hyun-joong, Yoon Eun-hye, Go Eun-ah	Warm-Up Game: Frog Butt Pushover (개구리 엉덩이 밀치기); Main Mission: Team! Chicken Fight (단결! 닭싸움); Of Course! (당연하지!)	Gu Jun-yup (Chosen)
99	September 25, 2005	X-Man 44; Episode 99	MC: Yoo Jae-suk; 강(Kang) Team Leader: Kang Ho-dong; 박(Park) Team Leader: Park Kyung-lim	Kang Team: Ji Sang-ryul, Jang Wu-hyuk, Shin Hye-sung, KCM, Lee Ah-hyun, Hwangbo, Chun-mu Stephanie; Park Team: Gu Jun-yup, Park Myung-su, Kim Jong-kook, Ha-ha, Kim Hyun-joong, Yoon Eun-hye, Go Eun-ah	Of Course! (당연하지!); Couple Event: Couples and Warriors Forever (커플장사 만만세)	Suspected: Yoon Eun-hye Gu Jun-yup (Not Found/Succeeds)
99	Notes	Mid-Autumn Festival Special.				
100	October 2, 2005	X-Man 45; Episode 100	MC: Yoo Jae-suk; 강(Kang) Team Leader: Kang Ho-dong; 박(Park) Team Leader: Park Kyung-lim	Kang Team: Ji Sang-ryul, Lee Min-woo, Kim Jong-min, Xiah Jun-su, Hwangbo, Jun Hye-bin, Jin Ga-young; Park Team: Park Myung-su, Kim Jong-kook, Ha-ha, Choi Jung-won, U-Know Yun-ho, Yu-ri, Kang Jung-hwa	Warm-Up Game: Lose Wrestling (지는 씨름); Mission 1: Team! Chicken Fight (단결! 닭싸움); Mission 2: Of Course! (당연하지!)	Kang Ho-dong (Chosen)
101	October 9, 2005	X-Man 45; Episode 101	MC: Yoo Jae-suk; 강(Kang) Team Leader: Kang Ho-dong; 박(Park) Team Leader: Park Kyung-lim	Kang Team: Ji Sang-ryul, Lee Min-woo, Kim Jong-min, Xiah Jun-su, Hwangbo, Jun Hye-bin, Jin Ga-young; Park Team: Park Myung-su, Kim Jong-kook, Ha-ha, Choi Jung-won, U-Know Yun-ho, Yu-ri, Kang Jung-hwa	Mission 2: Of Course! (당연하지!); Mission 3: Couple Event: Couples and Warriors Forever (커플장사 만만세)	Suspected: Ha-ha Kang Ho-dong (Not Found/Succeeds)
101	Notes	100th Episode Special.				
102	October 16, 2005	X-Man 46; Episode 102	MC: Yoo Jae-suk; 강(Kang) Team Leader: Kang Ho-dong; 박(Park) Team Leader: Park Kyung-lim	Kang Team: Ji Sang-ryul, Mun Hee-jun, Kim Jong-min, Kim Hyung-jun, Hwangbo, Shin Ji, Jang Hee-jin; Park Team: Kim Jong-kook, Park Myung-su, Ha-ha, Kim Hyun-joong, Choi Si-won, Chae Yeon, Gu Hye-sun	Warm-Up Game: Gomusin Butt Pushover (고무신 엉덩이 밀치기); Main Mission: Team! Chicken Fight (단결! 닭싸움); Of Course! (당연하지!)	Ji Sang-ryul (Chosen)
103	October 23, 2005	X-Man 46; Episode 103	MC: Yoo Jae-suk; 강(Kang) Team Leader: Kang Ho-dong; 박(Park) Team Leader: Park Kyung-lim	Kang Team: Ji Sang-ryul, Mun Hee-jun, Kim Jong-min, Kim Hyung-jun, Hwangbo, Shin Ji, Jang Hee-jin; Park Team: Kim Jong-kook, Park Myung-su, Ha-ha, Kim Hyun-joong, Choi Si-won, Chae Yeon, Gu Hye-sun	Of Course! (당연하지!); Couple Event: Couples and Warriors Forever (커플장사 만만세)	Suspected: Ji Sang-ryul (Found)
104	October 30, 2005	X-Man 47; Episode 104	MC: Yoo Jae-suk; 강(Kang) Team Leader: Kang Ho-dong; 박(Park) Team Leader: Park Kyung-lim	Kang Team: Ji Sang-ryul, Kim Jong-min, Ohn Ju-wan, Kim Hee-chul, Hwangbo, Jang Hee-jin, Kim Yoon-hee; Park Team: Gu Jun-yup, Park Myung-su, Kim Jong-kook, Ha-ha, Tablo, Chae Yeon, Ayumi	Warm-Up Game: Metal Bucket Punch! Punch! (양동이 펀치! 펀치!); Main Mission: Team! Chicken Fight (단결! 닭싸움); Of Course! (당연하지!)	Chae Yeon (Chosen)
105	November 6, 2005	X-Man 47; Episode 105	MC: Yoo Jae-suk; 강(Kang) Team Leader: Kang Ho-dong; 박(Park) Team Leader: Park Kyung-lim	Kang Team: Ji Sang-ryul, Kim Jong-min, Ohn Ju-wan, Kim Hee-chul, Hwangbo, Jang Hee-jin, Kim Yoon-hee; Park Team: Gu Jun-yup, Park Myung-su, Kim Jong-kook, Ha-ha, Tablo, Chae Yeon, Ayumi	Of Course! (당연하지!); Couple Event: Couples and Warriors Forever (커플장사 만만세)	Suspected: Kim Jong-kook Chae Yeon (Not Found/Succeeds)
106	November 13, 2005	X-Man 48; Episode 106	MC: Yoo Jae-suk; 강(Kang) Team Leader: Kang Ho-dong; 박(Park) Team Leader: Park Kyung-lim	Kang Team: Ji Sang-ryul, Jang Wu-hyuk, Kim Jong-min, Ryan, Hwangbo, Oh Seung-eun, Jang Hee-jin; Park Team: Kim Jong-kook, Park Myung-su, Lee Sung-jin, Ha-ha, Mikey, Chae Yeon, Hwang Jung-eum	Warm-Up Game: Take Off the Rubber Gloves (고무장갑을 벗겨라); Main Mission: Team! "Go" Fighting (단결! 고싸움); Of Course! (당연하지!)	Jang Wu-hyuk (Chosen)
107	November 20, 2005	X-Man 48; Episode 107	MC: Yoo Jae-suk; 강(Kang) Team Leader: Kang Ho-dong; 박(Park) Team Leader: Park Kyung-lim	Kang Team: Ji Sang-ryul, Jang Wu-hyuk, Kim Jong-min, Ryan, Hwangbo, Oh Seung-eun, Jang Hee-jin; Park Team: Kim Jong-kook, Park Myung-su, Lee Sung-jin, Ha-ha, Mikey, Chae Yeon, Hwang Jung-eum	Of Course! (당연하지!); Team! Chicken Fight (단결! 닭싸움); Couple Event: Couples and Warriors Forever (커플장사 만만세)	Suspected: Jang Wu-hyuk (Found)
108	November 27, 2005	X-Man 49; Episode 108	MC: Yoo Jae-suk; 강(Kang) Team Leader: Kang Ho-dong; 박(Park) Team Leader: Park Kyung-lim	Kang Team: Ji Sang-ryul, Lee Min-woo, Kim Jong-min, Won Woo, Hwangbo, Oh Yoon-ah, Jang Hee-jin; Park Team: Kim Jong-kook, Kim Jung-min, Park Myung-su, Ha-ha, Fany, Chae Yeon, Jang Mi-inae.	Warm-Up Game: Metal Bucket Punch! Punch! (양동이 펀치! 펀치!); Main Mission: Team! Chicken Fight (단결! 닭싸움); Of Course! (당연하지!)	Kim Jung-min (Chosen)
109	December 4, 2005	X-Man 49; Episode 109	MC: Yoo Jae-suk; 강(Kang) Team Leader: Kang Ho-dong; 박(Park) Team Leader: Park Kyung-lim	Kang Team: Ji Sang-ryul, Lee Min-woo, Kim Jong-min, Won Woo, Hwangbo, Oh Yoon-ah, Jang Hee-jin; Park Team: Kim Jong-kook, Kim Jung-min, Park Myung-su, Ha-ha, Fany, Chae Yeon, Jang Mi-inae.	Of Course! (당연하지!); Couple Event: Couples and Warriors Forever (커플장사 만만세)	Suspected: Lee Min-woo Kim Jung-min (Not Found/Succeeds)
109	Notes	Special appearance by Park Jun-gyu in episode 108.				
110	December 11, 2005	X-Man 50; Episode 110	MC: Yoo Jae-suk; 강(Kang) Team Leader: Kang Ho-dong; 박(Park) Team Leader: Park Kyung-lim	Kang Team: Park Myung-su, Park Jun-hyung, Son Ho-young, Kang-in, Chae Yeon, Lee Yoon-mi, Lee Ye-won; Park Team: Park Jun-gyu, Kim Jong-kook, Ha-ha, Kim Tae-woo, U-Know Yun-ho, Han Hyo-joo, Shin Ju-ah	Warm-Up Game: Be Careful of the Cold~ (감기 조심하세요~); Main Mission: Team! "Go" Fighting (단결! 고싸움); Of Course! (당연하지!)	Son Ho-young (Chosen)
111	December 18, 2005	X-Man 50; Episode 111	MC: Yoo Jae-suk; 강(Kang) Team Leader: Kang Ho-dong; 박(Park) Team Leader: Park Kyung-lim	Kang Team: Park Myung-su, Park Jun-hyung, Son Ho-young, Kang-in, Chae Yeon, Lee Yoon-mi, Lee Ye-won; Park Team: Park Jun-gyu, Kim Jong-kook, Ha-ha, Kim Tae-woo, U-Know Yun-ho, Han Hyo-joo, Shin Ju-ah	Of Course! (당연하지!); Couple Event: Couples and Warriors Forever (커플장사 만만세)	Suspected: Son Ho-young (Found)
112	December 25, 2005	X-Man 51; Episode 112	MC: Yoo Jae-suk; 강(Kang) Team Leader: Kang Ho-dong; 박(Park) Team Leader: Park Kyung-lim	Kang Team: Ji Sang-ryul, Jang Wu-hyuk, Tei, Micky Yu-chun, Kim Hyung-jun, Chae Yeon, Jun Hye-bin, Kang Jung-hwa; Park Team: Park Myung-su, Kim Jong-kook, Ha-ha, Lee Min-woo, Sung Si-kyung, U-Know Yun-ho, Park Jung-ah, Chae Young-in	Warm-Up Game: Plastic Bucket Hand Pushing (고무대야 손바닥 밀치기); Main Mission: Team! Chicken Fight (단결! 닭싸움); Of Course! (당연하지!)	Kim Jong-kook (Chosen)
113	January 1, 2006	X-Man 51; Episode 113	MC: Yoo Jae-suk; 강(Kang) Team Leader: Kang Ho-dong; 박(Park) Team Leader: Park Kyung-lim	Kang Team: Ji Sang-ryul, Jang Wu-hyuk, Tei, Micky Yu-chun, Kim Hyung-jun, Chae Yeon, Jun Hye-bin, Kang Jung-hwa; Park Team: Park Myung-su, Kim Jong-kook, Ha-ha, Lee Min-woo, Sung Si-kyung, U-Know Yun-ho, Park Jung-ah, Chae Young-in	Of Course! (당연하지!); Couple Event: Couples and Warriors Forever (커플장사 만만세)	Suspected: Park Myung-su Kim Jong-kook (Not Found/Succeeds)
113	Notes	Christmas/New Year's Special.				
114	January 8, 2006	X-Man 52; Episode 114	MC: Yoo Jae-suk; 강(Kang) Team Leader: Kang Ho-dong; 박(Park) Team Leader: Park Kyung-lim	Kang Team: Jung Jun-ho, Jung Woon-taec, Ji Sang-ryul, Kang Sung-pil, Kim Hee-chul, Chae Yeon, Kim Wan-sun, Han Hyo-joo; Park Team: Kim Sang-joong, Jung Woong-in, Park Myung-su, Kim Jong-kook, Ha-ha, Kim Hyun-joong, Choi Yoon-young, Chun-ja	Warm-Up Game: Butt Pushover (엉덩이 밀치기); Main Mission: Team! "Go" Fighting (단결! 고싸움); Of Course! (당연하지!)	Jung Jun-ho (Chosen)
115	January 15, 2006	X-Man 52; Episode 115	MC: Yoo Jae-suk; 강(Kang) Team Leader: Kang Ho-dong; 박(Park) Team Leader: Park Kyung-lim	Kang Team: Jung Jun-ho, Jung Woon-taec, Ji Sang-ryul, Kang Sung-pil, Kim Hee-chul, Chae Yeon, Kim Wan-sun, Han Hyo-joo; Park Team: Kim Sang-joong, Jung Woong-in, Park Myung-su, Kim Jong-kook, Ha-ha, Kim Hyun-joong, Choi Yoon-young, Chun-ja	Of Course! (당연하지!); Couple Event: Couples and Warriors Forever (커플장사 만만세)	Suspected: Jung Jun-ho (Found)
115	Notes	New Year's Special Part 2 - Screen Stars Special.				
116	January 22, 2006	X-Man 53; Episode 116	MC: Yoo Jae-suk; 강(Kang) Team Leader: Kang Ho-dong; 박(Park) Team Leader: Park Kyung-lim	Kang Team: Ji Sang-ryul, Lee Sung-jin, Brian, Tei, Chae Yeon, Shin Ji, Bae Seul-ki; Park Team: Park Myung-su, Kim Jong-kook, Ha-ha, Fany, Kang Ji-sub, Seo Ji-young, Su-jin	Warm-Up Game: Be Careful of the Cold~ (감기 조심하세요~); Main Mission: Team! "Go" Fighting (단결! 고싸움); Of Course! (당연하지!)	Fany (Chosen)
117	January 29, 2006	X-Man 53; Episode 117	MC: Yoo Jae-suk; 강(Kang) Team Leader: Kang Ho-dong; 박(Park) Team Leader: Park Kyung-lim	Kang Team: Ji Sang-ryul, Lee Sung-jin, Brian, Tei, Chae Yeon, Shin Ji, Bae Seul-ki; Park Team: Park Myung-su, Kim Jong-kook, Ha-ha, Fany, Kang Ji-sub, Seo Ji-young, Su-jin	Of Course! (당연하지!); Team! Balloon Dodgeball (단결! 풍선피구); Couple Event: Couples and Warriors Forever (커플장사 만만세)	Suspected: Ha-ha Fany (Not Found/Succeeds)
118	February 5, 2006	X-Man 54; Episode 118	MC: Yoo Jae-suk; 강(Kang) Team Leader: Kang Ho-dong; 박(Park) Team Leader: Park Kyung-lim	Kang Team: Shin Hye-sung, Ji Sang-ryul, Lee Min-ki, Jung Eui-chul, Chae Yeon, Jang Hee-jin, Kim Su-hyun; Park Team: Kim Jong-kook, Gu Jun-yup, Park Myung-su, Ha-ha, Lee Seung-gi, Lee Su-young, Shin Ae	Warm-Up Game: Hot Springs! Battle of the Ram (온천! 양의 전쟁); Main Mission 1: Team! "Go" Fighting (단결! 고싸움); Of Course! (당연하지!)	Lee Min-ki (Chosen)
119	February 12, 2006	X-Man 54; Episode 119	MC: Yoo Jae-suk; 강(Kang) Team Leader: Kang Ho-dong; 박(Park) Team Leader: Park Kyung-lim	Kang Team: Shin Hye-sung, Ji Sang-ryul, Lee Min-ki, Jung Eui-chul, Chae Yeon, Jang Hee-jin, Kim Su-hyun; Park Team: Kim Jong-kook, Gu Jun-yup, Park Myung-su, Ha-ha, Lee Seung-gi, Lee Su-young, Shin Ae	Of Course! (당연하지!); Floating Canoe (부표 카누); Main Mission 2: Float Arm Wrestling (부표 팔씨름); Couple Event: Couples and Warriors Forever (커플장사 만만세)	Lee Min-ki (Active)
120	February 19, 2006	X-Man 54; Episode 120	MC: Yoo Jae-suk; 강(Kang) Team Leader: Kang Ho-dong; 박(Park) Team Leader: Park Kyung-lim	Kang Team: Shin Hye-sung, Ji Sang-ryul, Lee Min-ki, Jung Eui-chul, Chae Yeon, Jang Hee-jin, Kim Su-hyun; Park Team: Kim Jong-kook, Gu Jun-yup, Park Myung-su, Ha-ha, Lee Seung-gi, Lee Su-young, Shin Ae	Couple Event: Couples and Warriors Forever (커플장사 만만세); Ting Ting Teng Teng Rice Table Game (팅팅탱탱 밥상놀이)	Suspected: Lee Min-ki (Found)
120	Notes	Overseas Special Part 2, Winter Story in Miyazaki, Japan - aired in 3 episodes.				
121	February 26, 2006	X-Man 55; Episode 121	MC: Yoo Jae-suk; 강(Kang) Team Leader: Kang Ho-dong; 박(Park) Team Leader: Park Kyung-lim	Kang Team: Ji Sang-ryul, Lee Sung-jin, Brian, Tei, Chae Yeon, Seo Ji-young, Jo Jung-lin; Park Team: Park Myung-su, Ha-ha, Kim Tae-hyun, Tablo, Lee Seung-gi, Lee Su-young, Shim Eun-jin	Warm-Up Game: Apple Game (으라차차 사과놀이); Main Mission: Team! "Go" Fighting (단결! 고싸움); Of Course! (당연하지!)	Tei (Chosen)
122	March 5, 2006	X-Man 55; Episode 122	MC: Yoo Jae-suk; 강(Kang) Team Leader: Kang Ho-dong; 박(Park) Team Leader: Park Kyung-lim	Kang Team: Ji Sang-ryul, Lee Sung-jin, Brian, Tei, Chae Yeon, Seo Ji-young, Jo Jung-lin; Park Team: Park Myung-su, Ha-ha, Kim Tae-hyun, Tablo, Lee Seung-gi, Lee Su-young, Shim Eun-jin	Of Course! (당연하지!); Couple Event: Couples and Warriors Forever (커플장사 만만세)	Suspected: Tei (Found)
123	March 12, 2006	X-Man 56; Episode 123	MC: Yoo Jae-suk; 강(Kang) Team Leader: Kang Ho-dong; 박(Park) Team Leader: Park Kyung-lim	Kang Team: Ji Sang-ryul, Lee Sung-jin, Bong Tae-gyu, Tei, Chae Yeon, Shin Ae, Jung Gu-yeon; Park Team: Park Myung-su, Sung Si-kyung, Ha-ha, Lee Seung-gi, Ha Suk-jin, Lee Su-young, Hong Su-ah	Warm-Up Game: Team! Butt Wrestling (단결! 엉덩이씨름); Main Mission: Team! "Go" Fighting (단결! 고싸움); Of Course! (당연하지!)	Bong Tae-gyu (Chosen)
124	March 19, 2006	X-Man 56; Episode 124	MC: Yoo Jae-suk; 강(Kang) Team Leader: Kang Ho-dong; 박(Park) Team Leader: Park Kyung-lim	Kang Team: Ji Sang-ryul, Lee Sung-jin, Bong Tae-gyu, Tei, Chae Yeon, Shin Ae, Jung Gu-yeon; Park Team: Park Myung-su, Sung Si-kyung, Ha-ha, Lee Seung-gi, Ha Suk-jin, Lee Su-young, Hong Su-ah	Of Course! (당연하지!); World Cup Special Mission: X-Man World Cup Just Kick It (X맨 월드컵 발로차); Couple Event: Couples and Warriors Forever (커플장사 만만세)	Suspected: Bong Tae-gyu (Found)
124	Notes	Special appearance by Tree Bicycle in episode 123.				
125	March 26, 2006	X-Man 57; Episode 125	MC: Yoo Jae-suk; 강(Kang) Team Leader: Kang Ho-dong; 박(Park) Team Leader: Park Kyung-lim	Kang Team: Ji Sang-ryul, Lee Sung-jin, KCM, Kim Ki-bum, Chae Yeon, Shin Ji, Choi Na.; Park Team: Park Myung-su, Kim Jung-min, Brian, Eru, Lee Seung-gi, Lee Su-young, Ba-da	Warm-Up Game: Team! Butt Wrestling (단결! 엉덩이씨름); Main Mission: Team! "Go" Fighting (단결! 고싸움); Of Course! (당연하지!)	Lee Su-young (Chosen)
126	April 2, 2006	X-Man 57; Episode 126	MC: Yoo Jae-suk; 강(Kang) Team Leader: Kang Ho-dong; 박(Park) Team Leader: Park Kyung-lim	Kang Team: Ji Sang-ryul, Lee Sung-jin, KCM, Kim Ki-bum, Chae Yeon, Shin Ji, Choi Na.; Park Team: Park Myung-su, Kim Jung-min, Brian, Eru, Lee Seung-gi, Lee Su-young, Ba-da	Of Course! (당연하지!); World Cup Special Mission: X-Man World Cup Just Kick It (X맨 월드컵 발로차); Couple Event: Couples and Warriors Forever (커플장사 만만세)	Suspected: Lee Su-young (Found)
126	Notes	New set.				
127	April 9, 2006	X-Man 58; Episode 127	MC: Yoo Jae-suk; 강(Kang) Team Leader: Kang Ho-dong; 박(Park) Team Leader: Park Kyung-lim	Kang Team: Ji Sang-ryul, Lee Sung-jin, Tony An, Kim Ji-hun, Chae Yeon, Jo Jung-lin, Seo Ye-na; Park Team: Park Myung-su, Kim Jong-seo, Kim Jin, Ha-ha, Lee Seung-gi, Lee Suk-jin, Uhm Hyun-kyung	Warm-Up Game: Tale Bites Tale (꼬리에 꼬리를 물고); Main Mission: Team! "Go" Fighting (단결! 고싸움); Of Course! (당연하지!)	Tony An (Chosen)
128	April 16, 2006	X-Man 58; Episode 128	MC: Yoo Jae-suk; 강(Kang) Team Leader: Kang Ho-dong; 박(Park) Team Leader: Park Kyung-lim	Kang Team: Ji Sang-ryul, Lee Sung-jin, Tony An, Kim Ji-hun, Chae Yeon, Jo Jung-lin, Seo Ye-na; Park Team: Park Myung-su, Kim Jong-seo, Kim Jin, Ha-ha, Lee Seung-gi, Lee Suk-jin, Uhm Hyun-kyung	Of Course! (당연하지!); Couple Event: Couples and Warriors Forever (커플장사 만만세); World Cup Special Mission: X-Man World Cup Just Kick It (X맨 월드컵 발로차)	Suspected: Tony An (Found)
129	April 23, 2006	X-Man 59; Episode 129	MC: Yoo Jae-suk; 강(Kang) Team Leader: Kang Ho-dong; 박(Park) Team Leader: Park Kyung-lim	Kang Team: Lee Sung-jin, Tony An, Yoon Jung-su, Tim, Chae Yeon, Bae Seul-ki, Nam Gyu-ri; Park Team: Park Myung-su, Kang-ta, Ha-ha, Lee Seung-gi, Kang Kyun-sung, Ba-da, Hwa-yo-bi	Warm-Up Game: Survival Chicken Fight (서바이벌 닭싸움); Main Mission: Team! "Go" Fighting (단결! 고싸움); Of Course! (당연하지!)	Kang-ta (Chosen)
130	April 30, 2006	X-Man 59; Episode 130	MC: Yoo Jae-suk; 강(Kang) Team Leader: Kang Ho-dong; 박(Park) Team Leader: Park Kyung-lim	Kang Team: Lee Sung-jin, Tony An, Yoon Jung-su, Tim, Chae Yeon, Bae Seul-ki, Nam Gyu-ri; Park Team: Park Myung-su, Kang-ta, Ha-ha, Lee Seung-gi, Kang Kyun-sung, Ba-da, Hwa-yo-bi	Of Course! (당연하지!); Couple Event: Couples and Warriors Forever (커플장사 만만세)	Suspected: Kang-ta (Found)
130	Notes	Park Kyung-lim's last show as Park Team Leader.				
131	May 7, 2006	X-Man 60; Episode 131	MC: Yoo Jae-suk; 강(Kang) Team Leader: Kang Ho-dong; 이(Lee) Team Leader: Lee Hyuk-jae	Kang Team: Jung Chan-wu, Lee Sung-jin, Tony An, Ha-ha, Chae Yeon, Nam Gyu-ri, Kim Mi-ryeo; Lee Team: Park Myung-su, Kim Tae-gyun, Kang-ta, Lee Seung-gi, Shin Ji, Hwa-yo-bi, Uhm Hyun-kyung	Warm-Up Game: Survival Butt Pushover (서바이벌 엉덩이 밀치기); Main Mission: Team! "Go" Fighting (단결! 고싸움); Of Course! (당연하지!)	Ha-ha (Chosen)
132	May 14, 2006	X-Man 60; Episode 132	MC: Yoo Jae-suk; 강(Kang) Team Leader: Kang Ho-dong; 이(Lee) Team Leader: Lee Hyuk-jae	Kang Team: Jung Chan-wu, Lee Sung-jin, Tony An, Ha-ha, Chae Yeon, Nam Gyu-ri, Kim Mi-ryeo; Lee Team: Park Myung-su, Kim Tae-gyun, Kang-ta, Lee Seung-gi, Shin Ji, Hwa-yo-bi, Uhm Hyun-kyung	Of Course! (당연하지!); Couple Event: Couples and Warriors Forever (커플장사 만만세)	Suspected: Jung Chan-wu Ha-ha (Not Found/Succeeds)
132	Notes	Lee Hyuk-jae becomes team leader of Lee Team, replacing Park Team. Featured the History of X-Man at the beginning of episode 131.				
133	May 21, 2006	X-Man 61; Episode 133	MC: Yoo Jae-suk; 강(Kang) Team Leader: Kang Ho-dong; 이(Lee) Team Leader: Lee Hyuk-jae	Kang Team: Lee Sung-jin, Tony An, Ha-ha, Kim Hyun-joong, Chae Yeon, Park Jung-ah, Yang Mi-ra; Lee Team: Park Myung-su, Lee Seung-gi, Kim Hyung-jun, Choi Si-won, Bada, Hwa-yo-bi, Cha Hyun-jung; Yu Team: Michelle Wie	Warm-Up Game: Team! "Go" Fighting (단결! 고싸움); Special Main Mission: Catch-Up To Michelle Wie (미셸위 따라잡기)*; Of Course! (당연하지!)*	Park Myung-su (Chosen)
134	May 14, 2006	X-Man 61; Episode 134	MC: Yoo Jae-suk; 강(Kang) Team Leader: Kang Ho-dong; 이(Lee) Team Leader: Lee Hyuk-jae	Kang Team: Lee Sung-jin, Tony An, Ha-ha, Kim Hyun-joong, Chae Yeon, Park Jung-ah, Yang Mi-ra; Lee Team: Park Myung-su, Lee Seung-gi, Kim Hyung-jun, Choi Si-won, Bada, Hwa-yo-bi, Cha Hyun-jung; Yu Team: Michelle Wie	Of Course! (당연하지!)*; Couple Event: Couples and Warriors Forever (커플장사 만만세); Special Michelle Wie Mission: Hit The Target (과녁을 맞혀라)*	Suspected: Park Myung-su (Found)
134	Notes	World Cup Special Part 1 - Michelle Wie Special. Michelle Wie is a special guest and does not belong to either Kang or Lee Team. Instead, she belonged to "Yu Team", in which double MCing with Yoo Jae-suk and only participating in special missions marked with an [*].				
135	June 4, 2006	X-Man 62; Episode 135	MC: Yoo Jae-suk; 강(Kang) Team Leader: Kang Ho-dong; 이(Lee) Team Leader: Lee Hyuk-jae	Kang Team: Ha-ha, Eric, Jun Jin, Andy, Chae Yeon, Park Jung-ah, Uhm Hyun-kyung; Lee Team: Park Myung-su, Kim Dong-wan, Shin Hye-sung, Lee Min-woo, Hwangbo, Hwa-yo-bi, Kim Sung-eun	Warm-Up Game: Team! World Cup Take Off Stockings (단결! 월드컵 양말벗기); Challenge! Penalty Shootout (도전! 승부차기); Of Course! (당연하지!)	Jun Jin (Chosen)
136	June 11, 2006	X-Man 62; Episode 136	MC: Yoo Jae-suk; 강(Kang) Team Leader: Kang Ho-dong; 이(Lee) Team Leader: Lee Hyuk-jae	Kang Team: Ha-ha, Eric, Jun Jin, Andy, Chae Yeon, Park Jung-ah, Uhm Hyun-kyung; Lee Team: Park Myung-su, Kim Dong-wan, Shin Hye-sung, Lee Min-woo, Hwangbo, Hwa-yo-bi, Kim Sung-eun	Of Course! (당연하지!)!; Main Mission: "Go" Fighting in Water (수중 고싸움); World Cup Vaulting Competition (월드컵 뜀틀대회); Couple Event: Couples and Warriors Forever (커플장사 만만세)	Jun Jin (Active)
137	June 18, 2006	X-Man 62; Episode 137	MC: Yoo Jae-suk; 강(Kang) Team Leader: Kang Ho-dong; 이(Lee) Team Leader: Lee Hyuk-jae	Kang Team: Ha-ha, Eric, Jun Jin, Andy, Chae Yeon, Park Jung-ah, Uhm Hyun-kyung; Lee Team: Park Myung-su, Kim Dong-wan, Shin Hye-sung, Lee Min-woo, Hwangbo, Hwa-yo-bi, Kim Sung-eun	Couple Event: Couples and Warriors Forever (커플장사 만만세); Fight Till Death: X-Man's Reenactment (사생결단: X맨의 재구성)	Suspected: Andy Jun Jin (Not Found/Succeeds)
137	Notes	World Cup Special Part 2 - Germany World Cup Special - aired in 3 episodes.				
138	June 25, 2006	X-Man 63; Episode 138	MC: Yoo Jae-suk; 강(Kang) Team Leader: Kang Ho-dong; 이(Lee) Team Leader: Lee Hyuk-jae/Park Myung-su	Kang Team: Kim Hyun-chul, Tony An, Ha-ha, Yoon Ji-hu, Chae Yeon, Kang Rae-yeon, Nam Gyu-ri; Lee Team: Park Myung-su, Lee Jong-su, Lee Jung, Kim Jae-wu, Hwangbo, Hwa-yo-bi, Bae Seul-ki	World Cup Special Mission: Challenge! Penalty Shootout (도전! 승부차기); Of Course! (당연하지!)!	Lee Jong-su (Chosen)
139	July 2, 2006	X-Man 63; Episode 139	MC: Yoo Jae-suk; 강(Kang) Team Leader: Kang Ho-dong; 이(Lee) Team Leader: Lee Hyuk-jae/Park Myung-su	Kang Team: Kim Hyun-chul, Tony An, Ha-ha, Yoon Ji-hu, Chae Yeon, Kang Rae-yeon, Nam Gyu-ri; Lee Team: Park Myung-su, Lee Jong-su, Lee Jung, Kim Jae-wu, Hwangbo, Hwa-yo-bi, Bae Seul-ki	Of Course! (당연하지!); Main Mission: Survival Skybridge (서바이벌 구름따리); Couple Event: Couples and Warriors Forever (커플장사 만만세)	Suspected: Lee Jong-Su (Found)
139	Notes	Due to Lee Hyuk-jae's personal matters, he was absent from the introduction and Survival Skybridge. Park Myung-su became the temporary team leader of Lee Team during Survival Skybridge. Challenge! Penalty Shootout, Couples and Warriors Forever and the Fingerprint Ceremony take place at an outdoor set this X-Man.				
140	July 9, 2006	X-Man 64; Episode 140	MC: Yoo Jae-suk; 강(Kang) Team Leader: Kang Ho-dong; 이(Lee) Team Leader: Lee Hyuk-jae	Kang Team: Lee Sung-jin, Ha-ha, Tim, Kim Jae-wu, Chae Yeon, Kill-Gun, Nam Gyu-ri; Lee Team: Park Myung-su, Lee Jung, Lee Seung-gi, Lee Sang-won, Hwa-yo-bi, Bae Seul-ki, Uhm Hyun-kyung	Warm-Up Game: Survival Skybridge (서바이벌 구름따리); Of Course! (당연하지!)	Lee Seung-gi (Chosen)
141	July 16, 2006	X-Man 64; Episode 141	MC: Yoo Jae-suk; 강(Kang) Team Leader: Kang Ho-dong; 이(Lee) Team Leader: Lee Hyuk-jae	Kang Team: Lee Sung-jin, Ha-ha, Tim, Kim Jae-wu, Chae Yeon, Kill-Gun, Nam Gyu-ri; Lee Team: Park Myung-su, Lee Jung, Lee Seung-gi, Lee Sang-won, Hwa-yo-bi, Bae Seul-ki, Uhm Hyun-kyung	Of Course! (당연하지!); Main Mission: Team! "Go" Fighting (단결! 고싸움); Couple Event: Couples and Warriors Forever (커플장사 만만세)	Suspected: Lee Sung-jin Lee Seung-gi (Not Found/Succeeds)
141	Notes	Couples and Warriors Forever and the Fingerprint Ceremony take place at an outdoor set this X-Man. Special appearance by Lee Young-ha in episode 140.				
142	July 23, 2006	X-Man 65; Episode 142	MC: Yoo Jae-suk; 강(Kang) Team Leader: Kang Ho-dong; 이(Lee) Team Leader: Lee Hyuk-jae	Kang Team: Kim Hyun-chul, Lee Jong-su, Ha-ha, Park Jin-wu, Shin Ji, Byul, Nam Gyu-ri; Lee Team: Park Myung-su, Kang-ta, Lee Kyun, Kim Ki-bum, Kim Ok-vin, Kill-Gun, Uhm Hyun-kyung	Main Mission: Survival Skybridge (서바이벌 구름따리); Of Course! (당연하지!)	Shin Ji (Chosen)
143	July 30, 2006	X-Man 65; Episode 143	MC: Yoo Jae-suk; 강(Kang) Team Leader: Kang Ho-dong; 이(Lee) Team Leader: Lee Hyuk-jae	Kang Team: Kim Hyun-chul, Lee Jong-su, Ha-ha, Park Jin-wu, Shin Ji, Byul, Nam Gyu-ri; Lee Team: Park Myung-su, Kang-ta, Lee Kyun, Kim Ki-bum, Kim Ok-vin, Kill-Gun, Uhm Hyun-kyung	Of Course! (당연하지!); Grab the Belt of Yudo (유도의 끈을잡고); Couple Event: Couples and Warriors Forever (커플장사 만만세)	Suspected: Park Jin-wu Shin Ji (Not Found/Succeeds)
144	August 6, 2006	X-Man 66; Episode 144	MC: Yoo Jae-suk; 강(Kang) Team Leader: Kang Ho-dong; 이(Lee) Team Leader: Lee Hyuk-jae	Kang Team: Kim Hyun-chul, Ha-ha, Lee Min-woo, Yoon Ji-hu, Chae Yeon, Baek Ji-young, Ayumi; Lee Team: Park Myung-su, Lee Jong-su, Kang-ta, Kim Kyung-rok, Hwangbo, Hwa-yo-bi, Im Eun-ju	Of Course! (당연하지!); Dui Dui Bang Bang Bus Game (뛰뛰빵빵 버스놀이)	Lee Min-woo (Chosen)
145	August 13, 2006	X-Man 66; Episode 145	MC: Yoo Jae-suk; 강(Kang) Team Leader: Kang Ho-dong; 이(Lee) Team Leader: Lee Hyuk-jae	Kang Team: Kim Hyun-chul, Ha-ha, Lee Min-woo, Yoon Ji-hu, Chae Yeon, Baek Ji-young, Ayumi; Lee Team: Park Myung-su, Lee Jong-su, Kang-ta, Kim Kyung-rok, Hwangbo, Hwa-yo-bi, Im Eun-ju	Dui Dui Bang Bang Bus Game (뛰뛰빵빵 버스놀이); Main Mission: Survival Skybridge (서바이벌 구름따리); Couple Event: Couples and Warriors Forever (커플장사 만만세)	Suspected: Lee Min-woo (Found)
145	Notes	Summer Special Part 1. Intro, Dui Dui Bang Bang Bus Game, Survival Couples and Warriors Forever and the Fingerprint Ceremony take place in an outdoor set this X-Man.				
146	August 27, 2006	X-Man 67; Episode 146	MC: Yoo Jae-suk; 강(Kang) Team Leader: Kang Ho-dong; 이(Lee) Team Leader: Lee Hyuk-jae	Kang Team: Jun No-min, Ha-ha, Lee Jung, Kim Ki-bum, Chae Yeon, Baek Ji-young, Lee Min-ah; Lee Team: Park Myung-su, Yoon Jong-shin, Lee Jong-su, Kim Kyung-rok, Hwangbo, Hwa-yo-bi, Jang Yoon-seo	Main Mission: Survival Skybridge (서바이벌 구름따리); Of Course! (당연하지!)	Yoon Jong-shin (Chosen)
147	September 3, 2006	X-Man 67; Episode 147	MC: Yoo Jae-suk; 강(Kang) Team Leader: Kang Ho-dong; 이(Lee) Team Leader: Lee Hyuk-jae	Kang Team: Jun No-min, Ha-ha, Lee Jung, Kim Ki-bum, Chae Yeon, Baek Ji-young, Lee Min-ah; Lee Team: Park Myung-su, Yoon Jong-shin, Lee Jong-su, Kim Kyung-rok, Hwangbo, Hwa-yo-bi, Jang Yoon-seo	Of Course! (당연하지!); Endure Pater (파테르 버티기); Couple Event: Couples and Warriors Forever (커플장사 만만세)	Suspected: Yoon Jong-shin (Found)
147	Notes	Couples and Warriors Forever and the Fingerprint Ceremony take place at an outdoor set this X-Man.				
148	September 10, 2006	X-Man 68; Episode 148	MC: Yoo Jae-suk; 강(Kang) Team Leader: Kang Ho-dong; 박(Park) Team Leader: Park Myung-su	Kang Team: Psy, Ha-ha, Andy, Choi Si-won, Chae Yeon, Lee Eon-jung, Ayumi; Park Team: Lee Jong-su, Lee Seung-gi, Kim Kyung-rok, Kim Ki-bum, Hwangbo, Hong Su-ah, Jo Ha-na	Warm-Up Mission: Survival Skybridge (서바이벌 구름따리); Know Your Multiplication (구구단을 외자구~); Of Course! (당연하지!)	Psy (Chosen)
149	September 17, 2006	X-Man 68; Episode 149	MC: Yoo Jae-suk; 강(Kang) Team Leader: Kang Ho-dong; 박(Park) Team Leader: Park Myung-su	Kang Team: Psy, Ha-ha, Andy, Choi Si-won, Chae Yeon, Lee Eon-jung, Ayumi; Park Team: Lee Jong-su, Lee Seung-gi, Kim Kyung-rok, Kim Ki-bum, Hwangbo, Hong Su-ah, Jo Ha-na	Of Course! (당연하지!); Main Mission: Team! "Go" Fighting In Water (단결! 수중 고싸움); Couple Event: Couples and Warriors Forever (커플장사 만만세)	Psy (Active)
150	September 24, 2006	X-Man 68; Episode 150	MC: Yoo Jae-suk; 강(Kang) Team Leader: Kang Ho-dong; 박(Park) Team Leader: Park Myung-su	Kang Team: Psy, Ha-ha, Andy, Choi Si-won, Chae Yeon, Lee Eon-jung, Ayumi; Park Team: Lee Jong-su, Lee Seung-gi, Kim Kyung-rok, Kim Ki-bum, Hwangbo, Hong Su-ah, Jo Ha-na	Couple Event: Couples and Warriors Forever (커플장사 만만세); Swim Cap Relay (수영모 릴레이); X-Man's Reenactment (X맨의 재구성)	Suspected: Psy (Found)
150	Notes	Summer Special: Korean Wave - China Hainan Special - aired in 3 episodes. Due to personal matters, Lee Hyuk-jae was unable to attend this X-Man, Park Myung-su substituted him as Park Team Team Leader this X-Man.				
151	October 1, 2006	X-Man 69; Episode 151	MC: Yoo Jae-suk; 강(Kang) Team Leader: Kang Ho-dong; 이(Lee) Team Leader: Lee Hyuk-jae	Kang Team: Ha-ha, Hero Jae-joong, Micky Yu-chun, Xiah Jun-su, Chae Yeon, Yu-ri, Yuk Hye-seung; Lee Team:Park Myung-su, Lee Jong-su, U-Know Yun-ho, Max Chang-min, Hwangbo, Im So-young, Bae Seul-ki	Main Mission: Survival Skybridge (서바이벌 구름따리); Of Course! (당연하지!)	Micky Yu-chun (Chosen)
152	October 8, 2006	X-Man 69; Episode 152	MC: Yoo Jae-suk; 강(Kang) Team Leader: Kang Ho-dong; 이(Lee) Team Leader: Lee Hyuk-jae	Kang Team: Ha-ha, Hero Jae-joong, Micky Yu-chun, Xiah Jun-su, Chae Yeon, Yu-ri, Yuk Hye-seung; Lee Team:Park Myung-su, Lee Jong-su, U-Know Yun-ho, Max Chang-min, Hwangbo, Im So-young, Bae Seul-ki	Of Course! (당연하지!); Touch Touch Wrestling (터치터치 레슬링); Couple Event: Couples and Warriors Forever (커플장사 만만세)	Suspected: Micky Yu-chun (Found)
152	Notes	Mid-Autumn Festival TVXQ Special. Of Course! takes place in front of a "Rock" set, that sits in front of the regular set. Couples and Warriors Forever and the Fingerprint Ceremony take place in an outdoor set this X-Man.				
153	October 15, 2006	X-Man 70; Episode 153	MC: Yoo Jae-suk; 강(Kang) Team Leader: Kang Ho-dong; 이(Lee) Team Leader: Lee Hyuk-jae	Kang Team: Park Jun-gyu, Ha-ha, Lee Seung-gi, Yang Dong-sun, Shin Ji, Park Si-yeon, Lee Min-ah; Lee Team: Park Myung-su, Lee Jong-su, Crown J, Kim Kyung-rok, Hwangbo, Yu-ri, Lee Hyun-ji	Main Mission: Survival Skybridge (서바이벌 구름따리); Of Course! (당연하지!)	Park Jun-gyu (Chosen)
154	October 22, 2006	X-Man 70; Episode 154	MC: Yoo Jae-suk; 강(Kang) Team Leader: Kang Ho-dong; 이(Lee) Team Leader: Lee Hyuk-jae	Kang Team: Park Jun-gyu, Ha-ha, Lee Seung-gi, Yang Dong-sun, Shin Ji, Park Si-yeon, Lee Min-ah; Lee Team: Park Myung-su, Lee Jong-su, Crown J, Kim Kyung-rok, Hwangbo, Yu-ri, Lee Hyun-ji	Of Course! (당연하지!); Touch Touch Wrestling (터치터치 레슬링); Couple Event: Couples and Warriors Forever (커플장사 만만세)	Suspected: Park Jun-gyu (Found)
154	Notes	Last X-Man of the original X-Man. Of Course! takes place in front of a "Rock" set, that sits in front of the regular set. Couples and Warriors Forever and the Fingerprint Ceremony take place in an outdoor set this X-Man.				
155	October 29, 2006	Episode 155	MC: Yoo Jae-suk, Kang Ho-dong, Lee Hyuk-jae	Various Past Guests		
155	Notes	A special episode featuring memorable moments of the show and the Top 10 Guests. Last episode of the original X-Man.				

== New X-Man ==
- Aired: November 5, 2006 – April 8, 2007

#	Original Air Date	X-Man # / Episode #	Hosts	Guests (Votes Received)	Missions	X-Man	Final results
156	November 5, 2006	X-Man 1 Episode 1	MC: Yu Jae-suk; 강(Kang) Team Leader: Kang Ho-dong; 이(Lee) Team Leader: Lee Hyuk-jae	Park Myung-su (38), Ha-ha (23), Lee Seung-gi (13), Ok Ju-hyun (10), U-Know Yun-ho (5), Andy (4), Hong Kyung-min (3), Park Jung-ah (2), Yang Dong-geun (2), Lee Jung-hyun (2), Son Ho-young (0)	Power Game: Dodgeball King X (피구왕X); Hand Separate, Lips Separate, Together Disagreeing (손따로 입따로 언행불일치); Star Battle Cold-Hearted OX (스타배틀 냉정한OX)	Park Myung-su - 38 Votes	Kang Team Wins
156	Topic	"신인 때 이렇게 뜰 줄 몰랐다!" (When this person was a newbie, no one thought he/she would be this famous!)				Park Myung-su - 38 Votes	Kang Team Wins
157	November 12, 2006	X-Man 2 Episode 2	MC: Yu Jae-suk; 강(Kang) Team Leader: Kang Ho-dong; 이(Lee) Team Leader: Lee Hyuk-jae	MC Mong (27), Ha-ha (24), Park Myung-su (22), Bae Seul-ki (10), Micky Yu-chun (10), Sung Si-kyung (9), U-Know Yun-ho (8), Jun Jin (7), Yuri (7), Andy (4), Kang Eun-bi (2)	Power Game: Dodgeball King X (피구왕X); Suspicion Talk: The Stairs of Possibility (설마의 계단); Star Battle Cold-Hearted OX (스타배틀 냉정한OX)	MC Mong - 27 Votes	Lee Team Wins
157	Topic	"연예인 휴대폰에 가장 많이 저장 된 사람은?" (The person with the most number of celebrities phone numbers?)				MC Mong - 27 Votes	Lee Team Wins
158	November 19, 2006	X-Man 3 Episode 3	MC: Yu Jae-suk; 강(Kang) Team Leader: Kang Ho-dong; 이(Lee) Team Leader: Lee Hyuk-jae	Brian (21), Kim Hyun-joong (16), Stephanie (12), Kan Mi-yeon (10), Lee Jung-hyun (9), Andy (8), Park Jun-gyu (6), Park Myung-su (6), Ha-ha (4), Ha Suk-jin (3), Heo Young-saeng (1)	Hand Separate, Lips Separate, Together Disagreeing (손따로 입따로 언행불일치); Suspicion Talk: The Stairs of Possiblility (설마의 계단); Star Battle Cold-Hearted OX (스타배틀 냉정한OX)	Brian - 21 Votes	Lee Team Wins
158	Topic	"이 사람의 외모가 나에게도 있었으면 좋겠다" (If I had that persons face, that would be great)				Brian - 21 Votes	Lee Team Wins
159	November 26, 2006	X-Man 4 Episode 4	MC: Yu Jae-suk; 강(Kang) Team Leader: Kang Ho-dong; 이(Lee) Team Leader: Lee Hyuk-jae	Kim Hyun-jung (14), Park Myung-su (13), Brian (12), Lee Seung-gi (11), Ha-ha (11), Andy (8), Ryan (7), Bada (6), Hong Kyung-min (5), Baek Ji-young (5), Ha Dong-kyun (3)	Power Game: Dodgeball King X (피구왕X); Suspicion Talk: The Stairs of Possiblility (설마의 계단); Star Battle Cold-Hearted OX (스타배틀 냉정한OX)	Kim Hyun-jung - 14 Votes	Kang Team Wins
159	Topic	"이사람 이미지 바꿀 때 됐다! 이미지를 바꾸면 더 잘 될 것 같다!" (This person is best to have their image changed!)				Kim Hyun-jung - 14 Votes	Kang Team Wins
160	December 3, 2006	X-Man 5 Episode 5	MC: Yu Jae-suk; 강(Kang) Team Leader: Kang Ho-dong; 이(Lee) Team Leader: Lee Hyuk-jae	Sung Si-kyung (21), Seven (19), U-Know Yun-ho (18), Park Myung-su (13), Jang Young-ran (11), MC Mong (8), Ha-ha (7), Young-woong Jae-joong (6), Stephanie (6), Andy (5), Lee Hyun-ji (0)	Power Game: Dodgeball King X (피구왕X); Star Battle Cold-Hearted OX (스타배틀 냉정한OX); Don't Ask Envelopes (묻지마 봉투)	Sung Si-kyung - 21 Votes	Lee Team Wins
160	Topic	"이 사람 지고는 못산다! 승부 근성이 가장 강한 사람은?" (This person just can't lose! The person who cares about winning the most?)				Sung Si-kyung - 21 Votes	Lee Team Wins
161	December 10, 2006	X-Man 6 Episode 6	MC: Yu Jae-suk; 강(Kang) Team Leader: Kang Ho-dong; 이(Lee) Team Leader: Lee Hyuk-jae	Jun Jin (32), Park Myung-su (31), Kim Tae-woo (9), Maya (7), Bae Seul-ki (6), Andy (3), Xi-ah Jun-su (3), Kim Ji-hoon (3), Ha-ha (2), Eru (1), Hwang Ji-hyun (1)	Power Game: Dodgeball King X (피구왕X); Star Battle Cold-Hearted OX (스타배틀 냉정한OX); Don't Ask Envelopes (묻지마 봉투)	Jun Jin - 32 Votes	Kang Team Wins
161	Topic	"이 사람 눈빛에 빨려들어간다! 눈빛이 가장 강렬한 사람은?" (The person who has the strongest eyes!)				Jun Jin - 32 Votes	Kang Team Wins
162	December 17, 2006	X-Man 7 Episode 7	MC: Yu Jae-suk; 강(Kang) Team Leader: Kang Ho-dong; 이(Lee) Team Leader: Lee Hyuk-jae	Jang Woo-hyuk (24), Lee Jung-hyun (23), Ju Young-hoon (17), Ha-ha (8), Hong Kyung-min (7), Park Myung-su (6), Micky Yu-chun (4), Stephanie (4), Andy (2), U-Know Yun-ho (2), Jo Jung-lin (2)	Power Game: Dodgeball King X (피구왕X); Hand Separate, Lips Separate, Together Disagreeing (손따로 입따로 언행불일치); Star Battle Cold-Hearted OX (스타배틀 냉정한OX)	Jang Woo-hyuk - 24 Votes	Kang Team Wins
162	Topic	"이 사람 실제로 보니 나이보다 동안이다!" (This person looks younger than they actually are!)				Jang Woo-hyuk - 24 Votes	Kang Team Wins
163	December 24, 2006	X-Man 8 Episode 8	MC: Yu Jae-suk; 강(Kang) Team Leader: Kang Ho-dong; 이(Lee) Team Leader: Lee Hyuk-jae	Baek Ji-young (44), Park Jung-ah (32), Son Ho-young (31), Jun Jin (27), Brian (26), Andy (21), Chae Yeon (19), Kim Hee-chul (19), Nam Gyu-ri (17), Eru (15), Tei (14), Choi Si-won (11)	Power Game: Dodgeball King X (피구왕X); Challenge! 3.3.3! Three Worded Poems (도전! 3.3.3! 삼행시); Hand Separate, Lips Separate, Together Disagreeing (손따로 입따로 언행불일치)	Baek Ji-young - 44 Votes	Lee Team Wins
164	December 31, 2006	X-Man 8 Episode 9	MC: Yu Jae-suk; 강(Kang) Team Leader: Kang Ho-dong; 이(Lee) Team Leader: Lee Hyuk-jae	Baek Ji-young (44), Park Jung-ah (32), Son Ho-young (31), Jun Jin (27), Brian (26), Andy (21), Chae Yeon (19), Kim Hee-chul (19), Nam Gyu-ri (17), Eru (15), Tei (14), Choi Si-won (11)	Hand Separate, Lips Separate, Together Disagreeing (손따로 입따로 언행불일치); Star Battle Cold-Hearted OX (스타배틀 냉정한OX)	Baek Ji-young - 44 Votes	Lee Team Wins
164	Topic	"2007년! 이 사람 꼭 '복(福)' 많이 받았으면 좋겠다!" (2007! This person will be very happy!)				Baek Ji-young - 44 Votes	Lee Team Wins
164	Notes	Christmas/New Years Special. X-Man 8 airs in 2 episodes.				Baek Ji-young - 44 Votes	Lee Team Wins
165	January 7, 2007	X-Man 9 Episode 10	MC: Yu Jae-suk; 강(Kang) Team Leader: Kang Ho-dong; 이(Lee) Team Leader: Lee Hyuk-jae	Yoon Hyun-jin (27), Park Chan-min (25), Yoon Young-mi (13), Choi Ki-hwan (12), Jung Sik-mun (10), Lee Hye-seung (9), Kim Il-joong (7), Jung Mi-sun (6), Kim Ju-hee (4), Lee Byung-hee (3), Andy, Park Myung-su, Ha-ha	Hand Separate, Lips Separate, Together Disagreeing (손따로 입따로 언행불일치); Challenge! 3.3.3! Three Worded Poems (도전! 3.3.3! 삼행시); Star Battle Cold-Hearted OX (스타배틀 냉정한OX)	Yoon Hyun-jin - 27 Votes	Kang Team Wins
165	Topic	"오락프로그램에 가장 잘 어울리는 아나운서는 누구?" (The announcer that best fits in an entertainment program?)				Yoon Hyun-jin - 27 Votes	Kang Team Wins
165	Notes	SBS Announcers Special.				Yoon Hyun-jin - 27 Votes	Kang Team Wins
166	January 14, 2007	X-Man 10; Episode 11	MC: Yu Jae-suk; 강(Kang) Team Leader: Kang Ho-dong; 이(Lee) Team Leader: Lee Hyuk-jae	Park Sang-min (16), Kang-in (15), Ha-ha (12), Andy (10), Bbaek-ga (9), Park Jun-hyung (8), Kim Ji-hoon (7), Jang Yun-jung (6), Stephanie (6), Lee Ki-chan (5), Park Myung-su (3), Shin Ki-hyun, Jung Su-young, Ji Ha-kun, Seo-young	Power Game: Dodgeball King X (피구왕X); Hand Separate, Lips Separate, Together Disagreeing (손따로 입따로 언행불일치); Rookie Battle Cold-Hearted OX (신인배틀 냉정한OX)	Park Sang-min - 16 Votes	Kang Team Wins
167	January 21, 2007	X-Man 10; Episode 12	MC: Yu Jae-suk; 강(Kang) Team Leader: Kang Ho-dong; 이(Lee) Team Leader: Lee Hyuk-jae	Park Sang-min (16), Kang-in (15), Ha-ha (12), Andy (10), Bbaek-ga (9), Park Jun-hyung (8), Kim Ji-hoon (7), Jang Yun-jung (6), Stephanie (6), Lee Ki-chan (5), Park Myung-su (3), Shin Ki-hyun, Jung Su-young, Ji Ha-kun, Seo-young	Rookie Battle Cold-Hearted OX (신인배틀 냉정한OX); Challenge! 3.3.3! Three Worded Poems (도전! 3.3.3! 삼행시); Star Battle Cold-Hearted OX (스타배틀 냉정한OX)	Park Sang-min - 16 Votes	Kang Team Wins
167	Topic	"이 사람 꼭~ 소개팅 시켜주고 싶다!" (This person really needs to go on a date!)				Park Sang-min - 16 Votes	Kang Team Wins
167	Notes	X-Man 10 airs in 2 episodes.				Park Sang-min - 16 Votes	Kang Team Wins
168	January 28, 2007	X-Man 11; Episode 13	MC: Yu Jae-suk; 강(Kang) Team Leader: Kang Ho-dong; 이(Lee) Team Leader: Lee Hyuk-jae	Chun Myung-hun (28), Jang Young-ran (26), Hwang Young-jin (12), Ha-ha (10), Brian (8), Park Myung-su (6), KCM (3), Kan Mi-yeon (1), Eru (0), Andy (0), Sung Si-kyung (0), Lee Eun-young, Lee Hyun-ji	Power Game: Dodgeball King X (피구왕X); Challenge! 3.3.3! Three Worded Poems (도전! 3.3.3! 삼행시); Star Battle Cold-Hearted OX (스타배틀 냉정한OX)	Chun Myung-hun - 28 Votes	Kang Team Wins
168	Topic	"이 사람, 방송에서 몸 사리지 않고 오버 액션한다!" (This person overreacts in programs!)				Chun Myung-hun - 28 Votes	Kang Team Wins
169	February 4, 2007	X-Man 12; Episode 14	MC: Yu Jae-suk; 강(Kang) Team Leader: Kang Ho-dong; 이(Lee) Team Leader: Lee Hyuk-jae	Park Myung-su (27), Tablo (16), Yoon Ji-min (14), Seo Ji-young (13), Kim Ji-hun (12), Kim Hyun-joong (8), Kim Hyung-jun (7), DJ Tu-Keut (5), Andy (3), MC Mong (2), Ha-ha (0), Lee Sun-il	Power Game: Dodgeball King X (피구왕X); Challenge! 3.3.3! Three Worded Poems (도전! 3.3.3! 삼행시); Star Battle Cold-Hearted OX (스타배틀 냉정한OX)	Park Myung-su - 27 Votes	Lee Team Wins
169	Topic	"단 둘이 있게 된다면 정말 어색할 것 같은 사람은?" (The person who is very shy when alone with someone?)				Park Myung-su - 27 Votes	Lee Team Wins
170	February 11, 2007	X-Man 13; Episode 15	MC: Yu Jae-suk; 강(Kang) Team Leader: Kang Ho-dong; 이(Lee) Team Leader: Lee Hyuk-jae	Kim Jang-hoon (19), Park Myung-su (17), Park Jung-min (15), Sol Bi (12), Brian (9), Hwangbo-ra (8), Bae Seul-ki (6), Yoon Ji-hu (4), Ha-ha (3), Andy (2), Kim Hyun-chul (0), Yang Eun-ji, Jin Tae-hwa	Power Game: Dodgeball King X (피구왕X); Challenge! 3.3.3! Three Worded Poems (도전! 3.3.3! 삼행시); Star Battle Cold-Hearted OX (스타배틀 냉정한OX)	Kim Jang-hoon - 19 Votes	Lee Team Wins
170	Topic	"유난히 외모에 돈을 많이 쓰는 사람은?" (The person who spends a lot of money on their appearance?)				Kim Jang-hoon - 19 Votes	Lee Team Wins
171	February 18, 2007	X-Man 14; Episode 16	MC: Yu Jae-suk; 강(Kang) Team Leader: Kang Ho-dong; 이(Lee) Team Leader: Lee Hyuk-jae	Kim Shin-young (37), Jo Jung-lin (36), Park Myung-su (5), Ha-ha (4), Andy (4), Sol Bi (4), Tablo (3), Kim Jang-hoon (2), Mithra (2), Park Jun-hyung (1), Shin Ju-ah (1), Park Hyun-bin (1)	Power Game 1: Dodgeball King X (피구왕X); Power Game 2:Wrestling King X (씨름왕X); Star Battle Cold-Hearted OX (스타배틀 냉정한OX)	Kim Shin-young - 37 Votes	Lee Team Wins
171	Topic	"이 사람, 참~ 복스럽게 생겼다!" (This person looks like they have a lot of good fortune!)				Kim Shin-young - 37 Votes	Lee Team Wins
171	Notes	Lunar New Year Special.				Kim Shin-young - 37 Votes	Lee Team Wins
172	February 25, 2007	X-Man 15; Episode 17	MC: Yu Jae-suk; 강(Kang) Team Leader: Kang Ho-dong; 이(Lee) Team Leader: Lee Hyuk-jae	Kim Hee-chul (21), Seo In-young (17), Park Myung-su (16), Lee Ji-hoon (12), Kim Jang-hoon (10), Seo Ji-young (9), Andy (6), Tei (6), Hyun Jin-young (4), Kim Kyung-rok (2), Ha-ha (2), Jung Ji-ah, TOP	Power Game: Dodgeball King X (피구왕X); Challenge! 3.3.3! Three Worded Poems (도전! 3.3.3! 삼행시); Star Battle Cold-Hearted OX (스타배틀 냉정한OX)	Kim Hee-chul - 21 Votes	Lee Team Wins
172	Topic	"연예계의 클레오파트라! 콧대가 가장 높은 사람은?" (The person who is very self-centered?)				Kim Hee-chul - 21 Votes	Lee Team Wins
173	March 4, 2007	X-Man 16; Episode 18	MC: Yu Jae-suk; 강(Kang) Team Leader: Kang Ho-dong; 이(Lee) Team Leader: Lee Hyuk-jae	Hwangbo (39), Kim Hee-chul (27), Shin Dong (11), Andy (8), Kim Jang-hoon (7), Park Sang-min (6), Kim Hyun-chul (5), Park Myung-su (5), Lee Ji-hoon (3), Ha-ha (2), Lee Sang-mi (0)	Power Game: Dodgeball King X (피구왕X); Challenge! 3.3.3! Three Worded Poems (도전! 3.3.3! 삼행시); Star Battle Cold-Hearted OX (스타배틀 냉정한OX)	Hwangbo - 39 Votes	Kang Team Wins
173	Topic	"성별이 바뀌면 오히려 더 나을 것 같은 사람은?" (The best person to have their sex changed?)				Hwangbo - 39 Votes	Kang Team Wins
174	March 11, 2007	X-Man 17; Episode 19	MC: Yu Jae-suk; 강(Kang) Team Leader: Kang Ho-dong; 이(Lee) Team Leader: Lee Hyuk-jae	Lee Ki-chan (32), Lee Ji-hoon (11), Kim Jang-hoon (9), Andy (7), Jang Na-ra (6), Sung-min (6), Ha-ha (5), Kim Hee-chul (4), Jadu (3), Park Myung-su (3), Boom (2)	Power Game: Dodgeball King X (피구왕X); Challenge! 3.3.3! Three Worded Poems (도전! 3.3.3! 삼행시); Star Battle Cold-Hearted OX (스타배틀 냉정한OX)	Lee Ki-chan - 32 Votes	Lee Team Wins
174	Topic	"이 사람, 왠지 지적인 이미지를 풍긴다!" (This person looks very intelligent!)				Lee Ki-chan - 32 Votes	Lee Team Wins
175	March 18, 2007	X-Man 18; Episode 20	MC: Yu Jae-suk; 강(Kang) Team Leader: Kang Ho-dong; 이(Lee) Team Leader: Lee Hyuk-jae	Oh Ji-heon (22), Kim Hee-chul (17), Kim Jae-woo (12), Park Myung-su (11), Baek Bo-ram (9), Tei (5), Ha-ha (5), Andy (4), Eru (2), Kang-in (2), Sol Bi (1)	Power Game: Dodgeball King X (피구왕X); Challenge! 3.3.3! Three Worded Poems (도전! 3.3.3! 삼행시); Star Battle Cold-Hearted OX (스타배틀 냉정한OX)	Oh Ji-heon - 22 Votes	Lee Team Wins
175	Topic	"이 사람 외모 때문에 더 많이 떴다!" (This person needs their face to be famous!)				Oh Ji-heon - 22 Votes	Lee Team Wins
176	March 25, 2007	X-Man 19; Episode 21	MC: Yu Jae-suk; 강(Kang) Team Leader: Kang Ho-dong; 이(Lee) Team Leader: Lee Hyuk-jae	Kim Young-chul (38), Park Myung-su (28), Yoon Jung-su (12), Kim Jang-hoon (7), Lee Jae-hoon (6), Lee Hyun-ji (3), Kim Hee-chul (2), Ha-ha (2), Andy (2), Hwangbo (1), Sol Bi (1)	Power Game: Dodgeball King X (피구왕X); Challenge! 3.3.3! Three Worded Poems (도전! 3.3.3! 삼행시); Star Battle Cold-Hearted OX (스타배틀 냉정한OX)	Kim Young-chul - 38 Votes	Kang Team Wins
176	Topic	"이 사람, 외모관리를 너무 안 한다!" (This person doesn't take care of their face very well!)				Kim Young-chul - 38 Votes	Kang Team Wins
177	April 1, 2007	X-Man 20; Episode 22	MC: Yu Jae-suk; 강(Kang) Team Leader: Kang Ho-dong (19); 이(Lee) Team Leader: Lee Hyuk-jae (7)	Ivy (12), Park Myung-su (12), Ha-ha (11), Tablo (8), Kim Hee-chul (7), Mithra (6), Sol Bi (5), Kim Jang-hoon (3), Im Jae-wook (2), Tony An (1), Andy (1), So-hee, Choi Jung-min	Power Game: Dodgeball King X (피구왕X); Star Battle Cold-Hearted OX (스타배틀 냉정한OX)	Kang Ho-dong - 19 Votes	Kang Team Wins
177	Topic	"무인도에 떨어져도 사막에 떨어져도 살아남을 것 같은 사람은?" (The person who can survive at a stranded desert or an island?)				Kang Ho-dong - 19 Votes	Kang Team Wins
177	Notes	The last X-Man of X-Man.				Kang Ho-dong - 19 Votes	Kang Team Wins
178	April 8, 2007	Episode 23	MC: Yu Jae-suk, Kang Ho-dong, Lee Hyuk-jae, Park Myung-su, Ha-ha	Various Guests			
178	Notes	X-Man Goodbye Special. A special episode featuring memorable moments of the show during its entire run. Last episode of X-Man, ending its 3 years and 6 months era.					
