= Tei (singer) =

South Korean singer (born 1983)

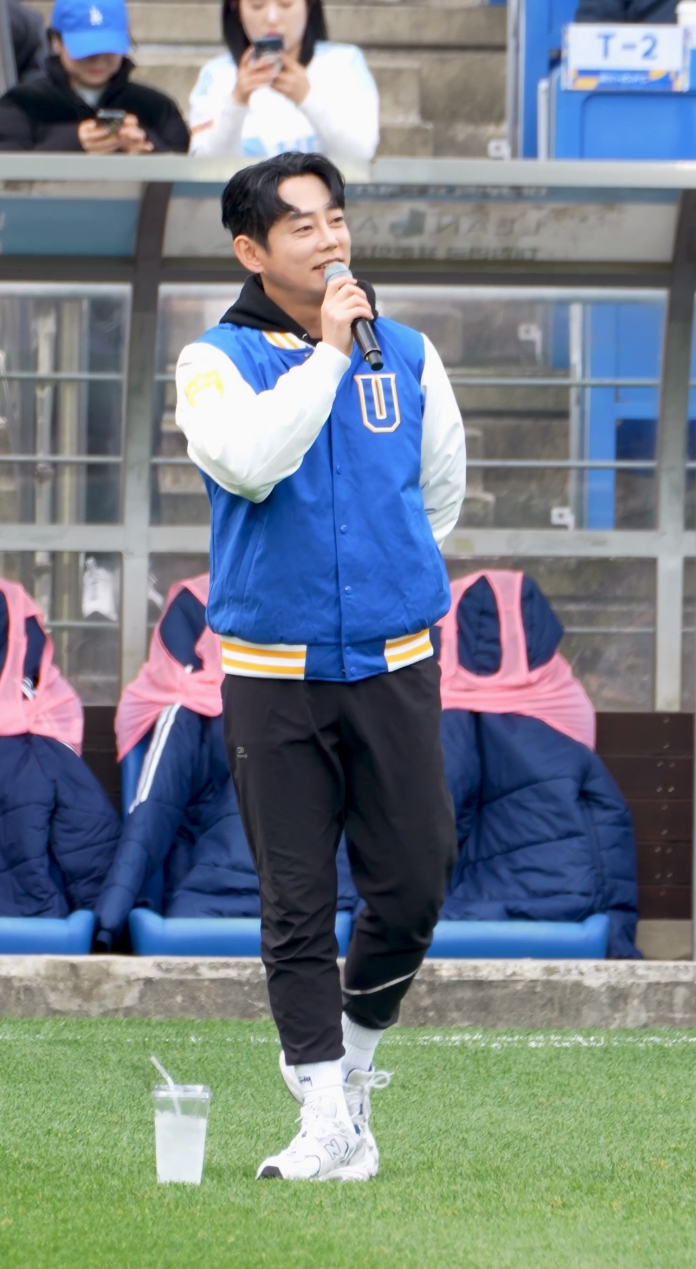
- Tei in 2025
- Born: Kim Ho-kyung; April 4, 1983 (age 43); Ulsan, South Korea
- Occupation: Singer
- Spouse: Unknown (m. 2023)
- Musical career
- Genres: K-pop; ballad
- Years active: 2004–present
- Label: HIS Entertainment
- Website: his-ent.com

Korean name
- Hangul: 김호경
- Hanja: 金鎬京
- RR: Gim Hogyeong
- MR: Kim Hogyŏng

Kim Ho-kyung (Korean: 김호경; born April 4, 1983), better known by his stage name Tei (테이), is a South Korean singer. He debuted in 2004 with the album, The First Journey.

== Biography ==
Born in South Korea, Tei's performance on stage in his high school was recorded and uploaded to a popular Korean website where he won a prize. He was invited to audition at JYP Entertainment Starlight Casting System and joined JYP Entertainment after he graduated from high school.

His hobbies include composing, movies, and writing. Before fame intervened, Tei wanted to be an architect, and studied towards that goal at Gyeongnam University. Tei sings and plays the guitar for his underground band.

In 2013, Tei finished his military service.

=== Relationship and marriage ===
On April 17, 2023, it was confirmed Tei would marry his girlfriend. On May 29, 2023, the couple married in a private ceremony.

== Career ==
While in high school, he led weekly performances with his underground band. Due to his singing abilities, he became known as the Mr. Big in school. When he was about to enter university, his composing talent and vocal abilities attracted the attention of JYP Entertainment. Tei joined JYP as a trainee and debuted after a three-year training period.

== Discography ==
=== Studio albums ===
Title	Album details	Peak chart positions	Sales
Title	Album details	KOR	Sales
The First Journey	Released: January 6, 2004; Labels: Kiss Creative Group; Formats: CD, cassette	4	KOR: 114,459
Ucupracacia	Released: February 1, 2005; Labels: Kiss Creative Group; Formats: CD, cassette	1	KOR: 102,688
Crazy in Love (세번째 설레임)	Released: November 21, 2005; Labels: Kiss Creative Group; Formats: CD, cassette	7	KOR: 45,381
Lover (애인)	Released: February 9, 2007; Label: Doori Star; Formats: CD	7	KOR: 18,751
The Note	Released: November 13, 2008; Label: Doori Star; Formats: CD	No data*	No data*
Tei (太利)	Released: August 16, 2010; Label: Doori Star; Formats: CD	9	—N/a
*2008 data not available from the Recording Industry Association of Korea.

=== Singles ===
Title	Year	Peak chart positions	Album
Title	Year	KOR	Album
"Love Leaves Its Scent" (사랑은... 향기를 남기고)	2004	—	The First Journey
"Love Is One" (사랑은...하나다)	2005	—	Ucupracacia
"Shout Out Longing" (그리움을 외치다)	2005	—	Crazy in Love
"Same Pillow" (같은 베개...)	2007	—	Lover
"Story Like a Miracle" (기적 같은 이야기)	2008	—	The Note
"I Miss You"	2009	—	Non-album single
"Wicked Tongue" (독설)	2009	—	The Shine 2009
"7 Things I Promise You" (너에게 약속하는 7가지) (with Kan Mi-youn)	2009	58	Non-album single
"Calling You In My Dream" (미쳐서 너를 불러)	2010	31	Tei
"Taste of Love" (사랑은... 엉터리다)	2010	—	Non-album singles
"I Love You" (그대를 사랑해)	2010	44	Non-album singles
"Memory Is More Beautiful Than Farewell" (추억은 이별보다 더 아름답다)	2013	35	Non-album singles
"Good Old Days" (그리운 날에는)	2015	84	The New Journey
"Why Is Love" (사랑은 왜)	2016	85	The New Journey
"Don't Say Goodbye" (헤어지지말자)	2017	—	Non-album singles
"Soonri" (순리)	2021	—	Non-album singles
"I Can End 7 Years in One Day" (7년을 하루만에 다 끝낼수 있구나)	2022	—	Non-album singles
"Sea Embrace" (바다가 사는 섬)	2022	—	Non-album singles
"Monologue"	2022	9	Non-album singles
"Making a New Ending of This Story" (이 소설의 끝을 다시 써보려 해)	2022	67	Non-album singles
"After Breaking Up" (헤어진 후에) (with Tanaka)	2023	—	Non-album singles
"Comb Honey Celebrity" (개꿀 연예인) (with UV)	2023	—	Non-album singles
"It's Strange, With You" (묘해, 너와)	2025	—	Non-album singles
"Last Love" (끝사랑)	2026	44	Non-album singles

== Filmography ==
=== Radio programs ===
2007–2008: KBS Tei Music Island

Beginning in 2015: MBC Tei's Dreaming Radio

=== Television dramas ===
- 2007: Love Is Hurt (Chinese: 坏爱情, Korean: 못된사랑) KBS drama
- 2008: Aristocrat (Chinese: 食客, Korean:식객) SBS drama
- 2009: Can Anyone Love? (Chinese: 不是谁都能爱)
- 2022: Business Proposal (Korean: 사내 맞선) (Cameo)

== Theater ==
Year	English title	Korean title	Role	Ref.
2022	Crash Landing on You	사랑의 불시착	Gu Seung-jun / Alberto Gu	
2022–2023	Dracula	드라큘라	Dracula	
2026	Hell's Kitchen		Davis	

== Awards and nominations ==
Award	Year	Category	Nominee	Result	Ref.
Golden Disc Awards	2004	Best New Artist	"Love Leaves Its Scent" (사랑은 향기를 남기고)	Won	
Korea Culture and Entertainment Awards	2022	K-POP Singer Award	Tei	Won	
Mnet Asian Music Awards	2004	Best New Male Video	"Love Leaves Its Scent" (사랑은 향기를 남기고)	Nominated	
Mnet Asian Music Awards	2005	Best Ballad Performance	"Love... Is The Only One" (사랑은...하나다)	Nominated	
Mnet Asian Music Awards	2008	Best OST	"Time Of Dreams"	Nominated	
