= Shin Jung-hwan =

South Korean singer and entertainer (born 1974)

- Born: 10 May 1974 (age 52); South Korea
- Occupations: Singer; entertainer
- Years active: 1994–present
- Agent: Koenstars
- Musical career
- Genres: Dance-pop; hip hop
- Instruments: Vocals

Korean name
- Hangul: 신정환
- Hanja: 申廷煥
- RR: Sin Jeonghwan
- MR: Sin Chŏnghwan

Shin Jung-hwan (Hangul: 신정환; born 10 May 1974) is a South Korean singer and entertainer. He debuted as a singer in 1994 as a member of the K-pop group Roo'ra, and later became a frequent guest on South Korean variety shows. His career was put on hold for several years, and his popularity plummeted after he was found guilty of illegal gambling while visiting the Philippines in 2010.

== Gambling controversy ==
On 20 January 2011, Shin returned to Korea. He was indicted without detention for habitual gambling, violation of the Foreign Exchange Trade Act as well as the Passport Act.

== Filmography ==
=== Variety shows ===
Year	Title	Ref.
2002–2003	Super TV Sunday is Fun (슈퍼 TV 일요일은 즐거워)	
2002–2003	Match Made in Heaven (강호동의 천생연분)	
2005	Chunpa (전파견문록)	
2007	Good Sunday	
2007–2010	Radio Star	
2008–2010	Sang Sang Plus (상상플러스)	
2017	Project S: Devil's Talent Donation (프로젝트 S: 악마의 재능기부)	
2021	The Age of Destiny	

=== Television dramas ===
Year	Title	Role	Ref.
2003	Bodyguard	N/A	
2003	My Fair Lady	Joo Tae-seong	

=== Web series ===
Year	Title	Role	Ref.
2023	Hwagok-dong Blues	Chief Shin	

== Discography ==
=== Country Kko Kko ===
- Country Kko Kko (1998)
- Happy Christmas (1998)
- Color of Chameleon (1999)
- Carol Album 2 (1999)
- Oh! Are You Going? (2000)
- Winter Traveling (2000)
- High Society (2001)
- Perfect! It's My Style (2002)
- Greatest Hits (2003)

=== Shinnago ===
- Project One (2004)
