= Lee Soo-geun filmography =

- Film: 4
- Television series: 4
- Television show: 106
- Music videos: 7

Lee Soo-geun (Korean: 이수근; born February 10, 1975) is a South Korean comedian

== Filmography ==
=== Film ===
Year	Title	Role
2004	The Magic Police	Support Role
2010	Shrek Forever After	Dubbed Rumpelstiltskin
2010	Chopsticks	
2013	The Snow Queen	Orm
2018	Detective K: Secret of the Living Dead	Comical dance choreographer

=== Drama ===
Year	Title	Role
2010	My Girlfriend Is a Gumiho	Police Officer, Ep.4
2012	My Husband Got a Family	Yoon Bin's former manager, Ep.21
2012	Reply 1997	Voice of substitute Bus Driver
2020	Hyena	Celebrity at Chair. Ha's birthday party, Ep.3
2021	So Not Worth It	Fortuneteller, Ep. 9
2022	The Driver	Cameo

=== Television shows ===
Off-Air On-Air

Year	Title	Role
2000–2013	Gag Concert	
2006–2007	Happy Together	
2007	Are You Ready	
2007–2013	Happy Sunday's 1 Night 2 Days	
2008–2009	Shin Dong-yup and Shin Bong-sun's Champagne	
2008–2010	Sang Sang Plus Season 2	
2008–2009	Crisis Escape No. 1	Main Host
2008–2009	God of Cookery Expedition	
2009	Welcome	
2009	Monarch of the Rings	
2010	Hakuna matata	
2010	Avatar	
2010	Par★Star	
2010	Happy Birthday	
2010	Delicious	
2010	스토리쇼부탁해요	
2010	Sweet Potato	
2010–2011	On Your Command Sir!	
2010–2013	Lee Seung-yeon & Lee Su-geun's Kitchen Road	
2011–2012	Invincible Youth 2	
2011–2013	Win Win	
2011–2013	Lee Soo Geun and Kim Byung Man's High Society	
2012	Three Idiots	
2013–2016	Cool Kiz on the Block	Ep. 1–32, 164–174
2015	Juk-bang Legend	
2015	Chicken Surfing	
2015	New Journey to the West	
2015–2016	Time Out	
2015–present	Knowing Bros	
2016	The Boss is Watching	
2016	Neighborhood Superstar	
2016	New Journey to the West 2	
2016	Variety Show Employment Agency	
2016	Hit the Stage	
2016	King of the Month	
2016	Boom Shakalaka	
2016	2016 Idol Star Olympics Championships Chuseok Special	
2016	Hit the Stage	
2016	Event King	
2016	Celeb Champions Trophy	
2016–2017	Singderella	Except Ep.10
2016–2017	Secretly Greatly	
2017	Abatak Travel	
2017	New Journey to the West 2.5	
2017	New Journey to the West 3	
2017	2017 Idol Star Athletics Championships	
2017	Guesthouse Daughters	
2017	Raid the Convenience Store	CEO
2017	The Bunker 8	
2017	It's Delicious	
2017	My Daughter's Men	
2017	New Journey to the West 4	
2017	Shadow Singer	Judge
2017	Law of the Jungle in Komodo	Legend of Hobbit (2nd Half)
2017	We Are Also National Athletes	
2017	My Foreigner Friend	Ep: 1 to 6 & 11
2017–2018	Master Key	
2017–2018	My Daughter's Men 2	
2017–2018	Night Goblin	
2017–2018	Cart Show	
2017–2018	Kang's Kitchen	Part-timer
2018	Talkmon	Talk Masters
2018	Friendly Driver	
2018	Do you want to rest today?	
2018	For The First Time In My Life	
2018	My Daughter's Men 3	
2018	Cart Show 2	
2018	Unexpected Q	
2018	Food Diary	
2018	Island Trio 2	
2018	New Journey to the West 5	
2018	New Journey to the West 6	
2018	Star Outing: Nolvengers	
2018–2019	We'll Show You, EXO!	Main Host
2018–2019	My Daughter's Men 4	
2018–2019	Bipedal Life	
2018–2019	Not the Same Person You Used to Know	Main Host
2018–present	Lee Soo Geun's Channel	
2019	Prison Life of Fools	
2019	Good People	
2019	Kang's Kitchen 2	Cast
2019	Perfect Combi	
2019	My Sibling's Lovers: Family Is Watching	
2019	Matching Survival 1+1	Main Host
2019	Kang's Kitchen 3	Cast
2019	Player 7	
2019	Three Meals in Iceland	
2019	We Play	
2019–2020	Modern Family	
2019–2020	New Journey to the West 7	
2019–2020	Cha Cha Cha Together	
2019–present	Ask Us Anything Fortune Teller	
2020	Is It Good?	
2020	My First Social Life	
2020	Player: Season 2	
2020	Idol Variety Corps Camp	
2020	Come Drive In	
2020	We Play: Season 2	
2020	Wheeling Camp	
2020	Lee's Kitchen Alone	
2020	Going to the Market	
2020	New Journey to the West 8	
2020–2021	People Who Buy Time - About Time	
2020–2021	The Fishermen and the City: Season 2	
2020–2021	There is No House in Seoul	
2021	Wild Wild Quiz	
2021	Famous Singer	
2021	New Journey To The West Special "Spring Camp"	
2021	Lee Soo-geun: The Sense Coach	
2021	Mr. Camper	
2021	True Golfer	
2021–2022	Mamma Mian	Main Host
2021–2022	Trust Me and Follow Me, Urban Fishermen 3	
2021–2022	Winner	
2021–present	The Girls Who Hit Goals	
2021–present	My Neighborhood Class	
2022	Fantastic Family	Host
2022	Daughter Thieves	Host
2022	Goal-Striking Overnight	Cast Member
2022	Trust Me and Follow Me, Urban Fishermen 4	Cast Member
2022	Extreme Beginner	Cast
2022	Hanbly	Cast Member
2023	City Sashimi Restaurant	Maid
2024	Watcha Up To?	

== Videography ==
=== Music video ===
Year	Name	Featuring
2006	고음불가	
2009	Let's Keep Going Until the End (갈때까지 가보자)	Eun Ji-won
2009	Happy Song (해피송)	
2009	160	featured in Eun Ji-won's fifth album, Platonic
2009	Soulmates (천생연분)	featured in 브랜뉴데이(Brand New Day) song
2010	HUK	Eun Ji-won
2010	The Journey of a National Tour (전국민여행송)	featured in 장근이 song
2022	"I hate trot" (나는 트로트가 싫어요)	Im Chang-jung
