= Ahn Jae-hyun =

South Korean actor (born 1987)

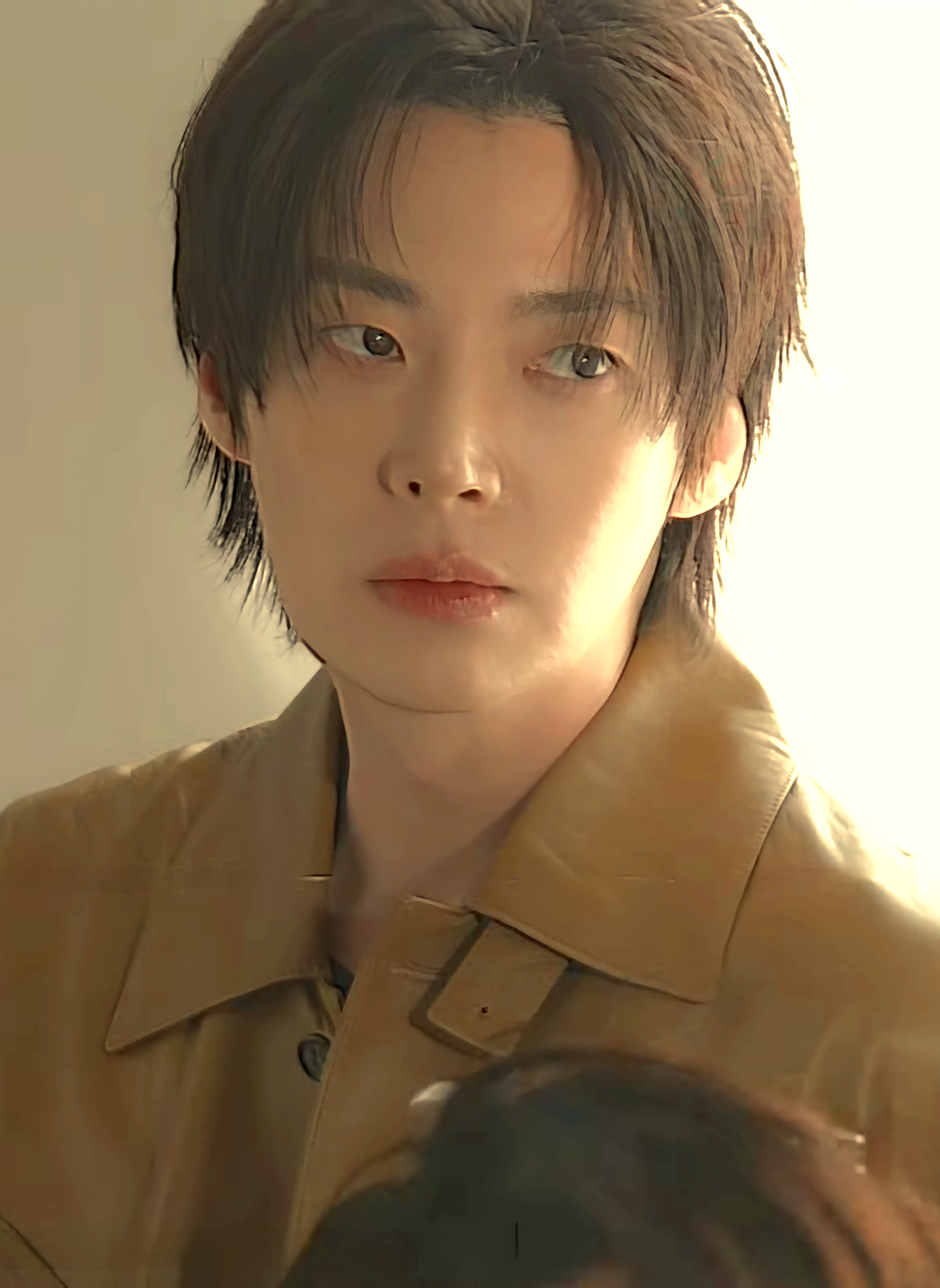
- Ahn in August 2024
- Born: July 1, 1987 (age 39); Seoul, South Korea
- Occupations: Model; actor
- Years active: 2009–present
- Height: 186 cm (6 ft 1 in)
- Spouse: Koo Hye-sun (m. 2016; div. 2019)

Korean name
- Hangul: 안재현
- Hanja: 安宰賢
- RR: An Jaehyeon
- MR: An Chaehyŏn

Ahn Jae-hyun (Korean: 안재현; born July 1, 1987) is a South Korean model and actor. He is best known for his roles in television dramas such as You're All Surrounded (2014), Blood (2015), Cinderella with Four Knights (2016), Reunited Worlds (2017), The Beauty Inside (2018), Love with Flaws (2019) and The Real Has Come! (2023).

== Career ==
Ahn Jae-hyun began his entertainment career as a fashion model in 2009, appearing in runway shows, magazine editorials and commercials. He gained recognition in 2011 while playing a delivery man in the cable variety show Lee Soo-geun and Kim Byung-man's High Society.

He also appeared in several music videos, including "Sad Song" by Baek A-yeon, "Please Don't" by K.Will, and "Gone Not Around Any Longer" by Sistar19.

In 2013, Ahn's popularity rose while playing actress Jun Ji-hyun's younger brother in the hit drama My Love from the Star. This led to more acting offers in 2014, including a role in police comedy You're All Surrounded and the webtoon film adaptation Fashion King. The same year, he was appointed to be MC for Mnet's weekly music program M Countdown.

In 2015, Ahn played his first leading role as a vampire doctor in Blood, and appeared in the two-episode fantasy drama Snow Lotus Flower alongside Lee Ji-ah.

In 2016, Ahn starred in tvN's romantic comedy series Cinderella with Four Knights, playing a chaebol and playboy vying for the main female lead's heart. He won the Top Excellence Award at the 9th Korea Drama Awards for his performance. He also joined the cast of travel reality show New Journey to the West, replacing Lee Seung-gi who enlisted in the army. The same year, he starred in the Chinese romance film Perfect Imperfection alongside Taiwanese actress Ady An.

In 2017, Ahn was cast as the second lead in SBS's fantasy romance drama Reunited Worlds. In 2018, Ahn was cast in the romance melodrama The Beauty Inside.

In 2019, Ahn returned to the small screen with a lead role in the romantic comedy drama Love with Flaws starring opposite Oh Yeon-seo.

In 2022, Ahn published his first photo essay List of Things to Remember, which went on sale June 8, 2022 at offline bookstores nationwide. Later in February 2023, Ahn donated 10 million won from the 2022 exhibition to help orphans who have suffered from the coronavirus.

== Personal life ==
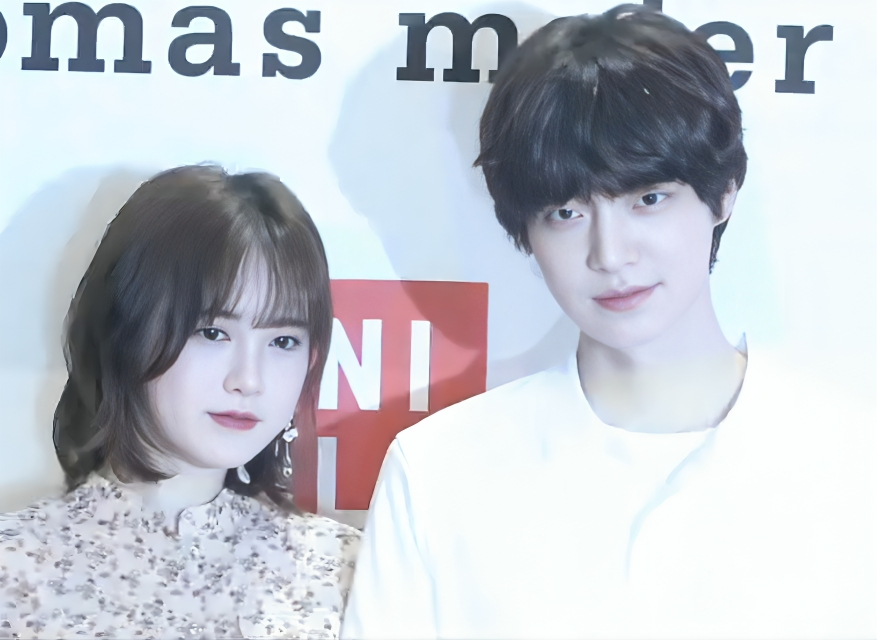
Ahn and Koo in 2018

On March 11, 2016, Ahn was confirmed to be dating his Blood co-star Koo Hye-sun since April 2015. The couple officially registered their marriage at the Gangnam district office on May 20, 2016, and married on May 21, 2016. They announced that instead of holding a wedding party, they would donate money to the pediatric ward of Severance Hospital, one of the oldest and biggest hospitals in Korea. The pair later appeared in the reality show Newlywed Diary produced by Na Young-seok, showcasing their married life.

In August 2019, it was reported Ahn requested a divorce from his wife. Ahn submitted an application to the Seoul Family Court on September 9, 2019 for divorce against Ku, and it was delivered to Ku on September 18, 2019. On October 21, 2019, he deleted all the photos on his Instagram account, which was speculated by the media to be an attempt to prevent further unnecessary issues and controversy about the divorce ahead of his upcoming TV series Love with Flaws.

== Filmography ==
=== Film ===
Year	Title	Role	Notes	Ref.
2014	Fashion King	Kim Won-ho		
2014	Timing	Kim Young-tak	Webtoon	
2016	Perfect Imperfection	Ann	Chinese film	

=== Television series ===
Year	Title	Role	Ref.
2013–2014	My Love from the Star	Cheon Yoon-jae	
2014	You're All Surrounded	Park Tae-il	
2015	Blood	Park Ji-sang/Jason	
2015	Snow Lotus Flower	Ma Moon-jae	
2016	Cinderella with Four Knights	Kang Hyun-min	
2017	Reunited Worlds	Cha Min-joon	
2018	The Beauty Inside	Ryu Eun-ho	
2019	Love with Flaws	Lee Kang-woo	
2023	The Real Has Come!	Gong Tae-kyung	

=== Television shows ===
Year	Title	Role	Notes	Ref.
2011–2012	Lee Soo-geun and Kim Byung-man's High Society	Cast member	episodes 1–53	
2013	Music Talk Talk Ma bling	MC		
2014	M Countdown	MC		
2016–2018	New Journey to the West (Season 2–6)	Cast member		
2017	The Lovebirds	Cast member	with Koo Hye-sun	
2017–2019	Kang's Kitchen	Cast member		
2021	Spring Camping	Cast member		
2021	Athletic Genius Ahn Jae-hyun	Main Cast		

=== Music video appearances ===
Year	Song title	Artist	Ref.
2012	"Sad Song"	Baek A-yeon	
2012	"Please Don't"	K.Will	
2013	"Gone Not Around Any Longer"	Sistar19	
2014	"Hair Short"	Wings	
2014	"The Space Between"	Urban Zakapa x Soyou	
2017	"On the Way Home"	No Reply	
2024	"No Sad Song For My Broken Heart"	K.Will	

== Discography ==
Year	Title	Artist	Notes
2013	"Maybe"	Dal Shabet	Narration
2014	"That Was You"	Ahn Jae-hyun	Track from You're All Surrounded OST

== Awards and nominations ==
Year	Award	Category	Nominated work	Result	Ref.
2009	4th Asia Model Awards	Best New Model	—N/a	Won	
2013	8th Asia Model Awards	Best Fashion Model	—N/a	Won	
2014	7th Korea Drama Awards	Best New Actor	My Love from the Star	Won	
2014	3rd APAN Star Awards	Best New Actor	My Love from the Star	Nominated	
2014	SBS Drama Awards	New Star Award	My Love from the Star	Won	
2014	3rd APAN Star Awards	Best New Actor	You're All Surrounded	Nominated	
2015	KBS Drama Awards	Popularity Award, Actor	Blood	Nominated	
2015	KBS Drama Awards	Best Couple Award with Koo Hye-sun	Blood	Nominated	
2016	9th Korea Drama Awards	Top Excellence Award, Actor	Cinderella with Four Knights	Won	
2016	9th Korea Drama Awards	Global Star Award	Cinderella with Four Knights	Won	
2016	7th Macau International Television Festival	Best Actor	Cinderella with Four Knights	Won	
2016	8th Macau International Movie Festival	Best Actor	Perfect Imperfection	Nominated	
2017	SBS Drama Awards	Excellence Award, Actor in a Wednesday-Thursday Drama	Reunited Worlds	Nominated	
2019	MBC Drama Awards	Top Excellence Award, Actor in a Wednesday-Thursday Miniseries	Love with Flaws	Nominated	
2023	KBS Drama Awards	Excellence Award, Actor in a Serial Drama	The Real Has Come!	Nominated	
2023	KBS Drama Awards	Popularity Award, Actor	The Real Has Come!	Won	
2023	KBS Drama Awards	Best Couple Award (with Baek Jin-hee)	The Real Has Come!	Won	
2023	KBS Drama Awards	Male Netizen Award	The Real Has Come!	Nominated	
