= My Daughter's Men =

- S4 promotional poster
- Genre: Entertainment
- Starring: Shin Hyun-joon; Lee Soo-geun; Kim Hee-chul; Park So-jin
- Country of origin: South Korea
- Original language: Korean
- No. of seasons: 4
- No. of episodes: 60

Production
- Running time: 70 minutes

Original release
- Network: E Channel
- Release: May 20, 2017 – January 27, 2019

Related
- My Sibling's Lovers: Family Is Watching (spin-off)

My Daughter's Men (Korean: 내 딸의 남자들:아빠가 보고 있다, or The Dads are Watching) is a South Korean TV Show distributed by E Channel. It airs every Sunday night at 9:00 KST.

== Format ==
Celebrity dads watch their daughters' dates with their boyfriends. What will the dads talk about, and how will they react as they watch their daughters' relationships?

== Host ==
Main Host

Name	Season(s)
Shin Hyun-joon	1–4
Lee Soo-geun	1–4
Kim Hee-chul	2–4
Park So-jin	2–4
Park Soo-ah	1

Special Host

Name	Episode(s)
Jang Yoon-hee	Season 4 (episode 14-16)

== Cast ==
Father	Daughter	Season(s)	Ref.
Kim Tae-won	Kim Seo-Hyun	1, 2	
Ahn Ji-hwan	Ye-in	1	
Choi Yang-Rak	Choi Hana	1	
Jeong Seong-mo	Jeong Jung-yeon	1	
Jang Gwang	Jang Yoon-hee	2, 3	
Park Jeong-hak	Park Ji-won	2	
Bae Dong-sung	Bae Soo-jin	2	
Lee Kwang-gi	Lee Yeon-ji	3	
Hong Seo-beom	Hong Seok-Hee	3, 4	
Song Ki-yoon	Song Woo-ju	4	
Ha Jae-Yeong	Ha Joo-Yeon	4	
Ahn Jung-hoon	Ahn Soo-Bin	4	

== List of episodes and rating ==
In the table below, the blue numbers represent the lowest ratings and the red numbers represent the highest ratings.

Season 1 (12 episodes)

Episode #	Air Date	AGB Nielsen ratings
1	May 20, 2017	—
2	May 27, 2017	0.560%
3	June 3, 2017	N/A
4	June 10, 2017	N/A
5	June 17, 2017	0.598%
6	June 24, 2017	0.520%
7	July 1, 2017	0.509%
8	July 8, 2017	0.731%
9	July 15, 2017	0.670%
10	July 22, 2017	0.505%
11	July 29, 2017	0.489%
12	August 5, 2017	0.439%

Season 2 (16 episodes)

Episode #	Air Date	AGB Nielsen ratings
1	October 14, 2017	0.633%
2	October 21, 2017	0.545%
3	October 28, 2017	0.565%
4	November 4, 2017	0.574%
5	November 11, 2017	0.837%
6	November 18, 2017	0.704%
7	November 25, 2017	0.471%
8	December 2, 2017	0.524%
9	December 9, 2017	0.510%
10	December 16, 2017	0.557%
11	December 23, 2017	0.486%
12	December 30, 2017	0.558%
13	January 6, 2018	0.847%
14	January 13, 2018	N/A
15	January 20, 2018	N/A
16	January 27, 2018	N/A

Season 3 (16 episodes)

Episode #	Air Date	AGB Nielsen ratings
1	April 15, 2018	0.2%
2	April 22, 2018	0.3%
3	April 29, 2018	0.519%
4	May 6, 2018	0.3%
5	May 13, 2018	0.510%
6	May 20, 2018	0.3%
7	May 27, 2018	0.400%
8	June 3, 2018	0.496%
9	June 10, 2018	0.4%
10	June 17, 2018	0.489%
11	June 24, 2018	0.713%
12	July 1, 2018	0.6%
13	July 8, 2018	0.4%
14	July 15, 2018	0.3%
15	July 22, 2018	N/A
16	July 29, 2018	N/A

Season 4 (16 episodes)

Episode #	Air Date	AGB Nielsen ratings
1	October 14, 2018	0.539%
2	October 21, 2018	0.693%
3	October 28, 2018	0.604%
4	November 4, 2018	0.475%
5	November 11, 2018	0.457%
6	November 18, 2018	0.543%
7	November 25, 2018	0.3%
8	December 2, 2018	0.3%
9	December 9, 2018	0.3%
10	December 16, 2018	0.3%
11	December 23, 2018	0.3%
12	December 30, 2018	0.502%
13	January 6, 2019	—
14	January 13, 2019	—
15	January 20, 2019	—
16	January 27, 2019	—

Note: This program airs on a cable channel/pay TV which normally has a relatively smaller audience compared to free-to-air TV/public broadcasters (KBS, SBS, MBC and EBS)
