= My Sibling's Lovers: Family Is Watching =

- Promotional poster
- Genre: Entertainment
- Starring: Lee Soo-geun; Kim Hee-chul; Hwang Bo-ra; Jang Yoon-hee
- Country of origin: South Korea
- Original language: Korean
- No. of episodes: 6

Production
- Running time: 60 minutes

Original release
- Network: E Channel
- Release: June 16 – July 21, 2019

Related
- My Daughter's Men

My Sibling's Lovers: Family Is Watching (Korean: 내 형제의 연인들 : 가족이 보고있다) is a South Korean TV Show distributed by E Channel. It airs every Sunday night at 9:00 KST.

== Format ==
A spin-off of My Daughter's Men.

My Sibling's Lover follows a similar principle with the celebrities watching the dates of their siblings as they try to find love.

== Host ==
- Lee Soo-geun
- Kim Hee-chul
- Hwang Bo-ra
- Jang Yoon-hee
- Cho Kyu-hyun (Special Host - Ep. 6)

== Cast ==
- Lee Mal-nyeon
- Park Sung-kwang
- Jung Tae-woo
- Kisum
