= Come Drive In =

South Korean television program

- Promotional poster
- Hangul: 전국민 드루와
- Lit.: Citizens Around the Country, Come Drive In
- RR: Jeongungmin deuruwa
- MR: Chŏn'gungmin tŭruwa
- Genre: Variety; Music; Talk show
- Starring: Lee Soo-geun; Boom
- Country of origin: South Korea
- Original language: Korean
- No. of seasons: 1
- No. of episodes: 10

Production
- Production location: South Korea
- Running time: 90 minutes

Original release
- Network: MBN
- Release: May 31 – August 3, 2020

Come Drive In (Korean: 전국민 드루와; RR: Jeongungmin deuruwa) is a South Korean television program that airs on MBN, and aired every Monday at 23:00 (KST).

It was originally aired on Sundays at 21:20 (KST) for its first two episodes.

== Overview ==
Lee Soo-geun and Boom, together with one special host, are put in charge of a special drive-through karaoke. From singing to talks, everything is done within the vehicle.

=== Rules ===
Episode 1-7

- Contestants can be of any background, regardless of whether he/she is able to drive a vehicle or not. Solo contestants or contestants coming in groups are welcome, and any type of vehicle is allowed.
- Before entering, he/she would choose one song to sing. After that, he/she will drive into the booth, where the hosts are situated, and then sing the song.
- After singing, if all the hosts have passed the contestant, he/she can get a cash prize by randomly choosing only one car key out of five, and unlocking the car's boot to confirm the amount of the cash prize. The amounts are ₩100,000, ₩200,000, ₩300,000, ₩500,000 and ₩1,000,000.
- If he/she has failed to get all three passes, they can choose a host for the token of appreciation. Each of the hosts represents one of the three types of tokens of appreciation decided at the start of the episode.

Episode 8-10

- There is a different set of rules compared to the first seven episodes, whereby instead of every contestant getting the chance of winning the cash prize, in each episode, contestants will compete against one another to win only one cash prize.
- After singing, if all the hosts have passed the contestant, not only he/she will instantly get ₩100,000, he/she will temporarily take the first place spot.
- The hosts will also decide whether another contestant performs better than the contestant currently in the first place spot. The former will take over the first place spot from the latter, if the hosts decided to open the car's boot with the "Change of Come Drive King". If the hosts opened the car's boot with the ₩100,000 cash prize, the contestant will drive away with it, and not replace it as the new Come Drive King.
- The final contestant in the first place spot for the episode will be crowned the Come Drive King (드루왕) and wins a cash prize of ₩3,000,000.

== Host ==
- Lee Soo-geun
- Boom

== Episodes ==
- In the ratings below, the highest rating for the show will be in red and the lowest rating for the show will be in blue.

Episode	Broadcast Date	Special Host	Total Amount of Money Given Away	Guest Appearances	Ratings (Nielsen Korea) (Nationalwide)
1	May 31	Hong Jin-young	₩5,900,000	Ham So-won; Clon	1.126%
2	June 7	Insooni	₩1,300,000	Christina Confalonieri; Park Nam-jung	0.969%
3	June 15	Kim Wan-sun	₩4,300,000	Park Ku-yoon; Kim Kyung-jin and Jeon Soo-min; Second Aunt Kim Davi; Oh My Girl (Hyojung, Mimi, YooA, Seunghee)	1.258%
4	June 22	Jin Sung	₩2,700,000	Lim Ju-ri and Jaeha (Lee Jin-ho) (Note: Son of Lim Ju-ri); Kim Chul-min	1.279%
5	June 29	Yang Dong-geun	Not mentioned	Kim Yong-myung; Kim Chul-min; Ahn Ji-hyun, Park Ye-jin, (Note: Cheerleader) Park So-jung and Lee Shi-ah; Kim Kook-hwan	0.934%
6	July 6	Kim Soo-mi	₩3,800,000	Kim Kwang-kyu; Park Hae-mi; Kangnam; Hyun Mi; Kanto and Gree; Nam Chang-hee, Oh Na-mi and Kim Seung-hye; Park Wan-kyu (Boohwal)	1.583%
7	July 13	Kim Soo-mi	₩3,800,000	Harisu and Ha Hyun-gon; J Black and Mmary	1.362%
7	July 13	Noh Sa-yeon	₩3,900,000	Kim Hyun-jung; Ahn Sung-hoon	1.362%
8	July 20	Kim Jong-min (Koyote)	—N/a (Note: Change of rules beginning episode 8, hence the amount of money given away is ₩3,000,000 for each episode.)	Koyote (Shin Ji, Bbaek Ga); Chun Myung-hoon; Tae Jin-ah; Hyun Mi and Kim Sang-hwan (Note: Foster son of Hyun Mi)	1.348%
9	July 27	Nam Sang-il	—N/a	Chae Yeon; Hong Seok-cheon and Wax; Kim Mi-ryeo	1.122%
10	August 3	Tae Jin-ah	—N/a	Nam Chang-hee; Kim Jang-hoon; Brian (Fly to the Sky), Kang In-soo and Lee Ye-joon	1.284%
