= Boom (entertainer) =

South Korean entertainer (born 1982)

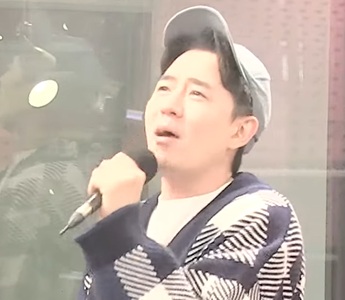
- Boom in 2019 during Boom Boom Power
- Born: Lee Min-ho; May 10, 1982 (age 44); Yeongwol, Gangwon, South Korea
- Occupations: Singer; rapper; actor; television host; radio host
- Spouse: Unknown (m. 2022)
- Children: 2
- Musical career
- Genres: Hip hop; rap; pop; dance
- Instrument: Beatboxing
- Years active: 1997–present
- Label: Bliss Entertainment

Korean name
- Hangul: 이민호
- Hanja: 李敏鎬
- RR: I Minho
- MR: I Minho

Lee Min-ho (Korean: 이민호; born May 10, 1982), better known as Boom (붐), is a South Korean rapper, singer, actor, radio host, and television presenter. He has made numerous television appearances in South Korean comedy shows and has acted in sitcoms as well.

== Career ==
He debuted in 1997 with the group Key with the first album Key. After their disbandment in 1998, he joined Nuclear in 1999 and released one album, Nuclear, before disbandment. Later in 2001, he belonged to the group Lexa with Geum Bi, who would later become a member of the South Korean band Turtles, but it disbanded after a year. In 2006, Boom released his first solo single "Boom Up", followed by his second single "Shout Out" in 2007.

Boom gained popularity through his comic appearances on variety shows such as X-man and Love Letter. He went on to host shows such as Mnet's School of Rock, although it was not until 2008 that he became well known as an MC through popular shows such as Idol Show, Star King and Champagne. From 2009, he hosted a special segment, Boom Academy, with Super Junior's Leeteuk, Eunhyuk and Shindong, on SBS' Strong Heart.

On October 29, 2009, Boom was enlisted for mandatory military service at a military training center in Gangwon-do Province. He reported to the 102 Replacement Depot in Chuncheon for six weeks of basic training followed by 22 months of active duty. He appeared on March 5, 2010, in an Armed Forces Television event where he was the MC for USO type show featuring girl group Kara. During the performance, he was dressed in a Republic of Korea Navy enlisted dress uniform.

Boom was discharged from the army on August 22, 2011, by the Defense Media Agency of the Ministry of National Defense where he had been serving as a PR agent. Boom returned to Strong Heart as a regular guest, known as one of the six fixed panelists and to lead Boom Academy. He released a music video, "Boom is Back", to celebrate his discharge and signed onto host SBS' radio show Young Street.

== Controversies ==
On November 10 and 11, 2013, Boom and several other celebrities, including Tak Jae-hoon, Andy Lee, Lee Soo-geun and Yang Se-hyung, were prosecuted for partaking in illegal gambling. The Seoul Central District Court classified Boom's case as a general gambling crime, and he was fined 5 million won.

== Personal life ==
On March 10, 2022, Boom announced through his fan cafe and agency that he would be marrying a non-celebrity girlfriend on April 9, 2022. On March 22, 2024, the couple welcomed their first child, a girl. Lee and his wife welcomed a second daughter on April 24, 2026.

== Filmography ==
=== Variety shows ===
==== Present shows ====
Year	Title	Role	Notes	Ref.
2018–present	Amazing Saturday	Host		
2019–present	Where is My Home	Cast	From Ep. 43	
2020–present	Buddy Into the Wild	Cast		
2020–2022	Mr Trot	Master	Season 1–2	
2021–present	Stars' Top Recipe at Fun-staurant	Host	From Ep. 33	
2021–present	I Love Tuesday Night	Host		
2021–present	Who Am I	Host		
2022–present	Forsythia School	Host		
2022–present	TMI Show	Host		
2022–present	Our Trot	Host	Chuseok Special	
2022–present	Star Birth	Entertainment president		
2023	Miss Wife	Host	MBC Lunar New Year	
2023	Girls Re:Verse	Host		
2023	Show King Night	Host		

==== Former shows ====
Year	Title	Role	Notes	Ref.
2009	Challenge! Good Song	Co-host		
2009–2013	Strong Heart	Co-host		
2011–2013	Star King	Host		
2011–2012	Invincible Youth Season 2	Host		
2013	Let's Go Dream Team! Season 2	Co-host	Appeared from Ep 184 – 209	
2015	Her Secret Weapon	Host		
2016–2017	PeekaVoo!	Host	For the 'Hatching Out Live' segment	
2018	Law of the Jungle in Last Indian Ocean	Cast Member	Part of first half tribe member. (Episodes: 338–339)	
2018	BPS	Host		
2018	Cart Show 2	Co-host		
2018	Which Star are You From	Host		
2018–2019	A Favorable Night For You, Opening at Night	Co-host		
2019	Hollywood Breakfast	Manager		
2019	Dating DNA Laboratory X	Celebrity dating professionals		
2019	Shopping Cart Savior	Cast		
2019	A Battle of One Voice: 300 S2	Singalong Fairy		
2019	Show! Audio Jockey	AJ		
2019	Super Hearer	Villain		
2019	Not the Same Person You Used to Know V2	Cast		
2019	Broadcasting on Your Side	Commentator		
2019	The Ranksters	Ranking Market Employees		
2019	Running Karaoke	Host	Chuseok special program	
2019	Seoul Mate 3	Cast		
2019	Eccentrics Next Door	Cast		
2019	Song Ga-in is Coming	Cast		
2019	Good Jobs in the World	Cast		
2019	Somebody 2	Cast		
2018–2020	Idol League	Host		
2019–2020	Joy of SSsireum	Cast		
2020	Money Road	Cast		
2020	Mr Trot	Master		
2020	Taste of Mr Trot	Host		
2020	Battle of the Musicians	Cast		
2019–2020	Broadcasting on Your Side	Commentator		
2020	Come Drive In	MC		
2020	K-Trot in Town	MC		
2020	Give Away the Answer Quiz Show: Today's Delivery	MC		
2020	Redevelopment of Love	MC		
2020	Chuseok Special: It's Ramyeon Time	MC		
2020	Korea's Paldo Speciality Certification Show: It's Me	MC		
2020–2021	Pet Vitamin	MC		
2020–2021	Bbongsunga School	Homeroom Teacher		
2020–2021	Miss Trot Season 2	Master		
2021	Miss Trot 2 Gala Show	Host		
2021	An Ant's Dream	Jurin		
2021	Miss Trot 2 Talk Concert	Host		
2021	Long Live Independence	Host		
2021	Idol Dictation Contest	Do Rae Mi Market		
2021	Let's be my daughter	MC		
2020–2021	Romantic Call Centre	MC		
2021	Where I Return to Myself – Liberation Town	Cast		
2021	Mialin	Host		
2021	Collab Boom Scene	Host		
2021	Awesome Romance	Host		
2021	Superhero	Host		
2021	Tomorrow's National Singer	Judge		
2020–2022	Dinga Dinga	Host		
2020–2022	Idol Dictation Contest 2	Host		

==== TV appearances ====
Year	Title	Role	Notes
2016	King of Mask Singer	Contestant	Appeared on Ep 67 as contestant, "Black and White Chessman"
2017	Guesthouse Daughters	Guest	Appeared on Ep 9, 11 – 12 as guest host

=== Television series ===
Year	Title	Role	Notes
2005	Nonstop	Cameo	
2016	Entourage	Cameo	Appeared on Ep 3

=== Film ===
Year	Title	Role
2006	Over the Border	Reporter

=== Hosting ===
Year	Title	Notes	Ref.
2020	2020 SBS Gayo Daejeon in Daegu "The Wonder Year"	with Kim Hee-chul and Lee Na-eun	
2021	2021 SBS Gayo Daejeon	with Key and Yuna (Itzy)	
2022	31st Seoul Music Awards	with Kim Sung-joo and Kim Seol-hyun	

=== Radio ===
Year	Title	Network
2007–2008	Boom's Fun Fun Radio (붐의 Fun Fun 라디오)	MBC FM4U
2011–2013	Boom's Young Street (붐의 영스트리트)	SBS Power FM
2016–2017	DJ Boom's Driving Club (DJ 붐의 드라이빙 클럽)	SBS Love FM
2017–2022	Boom Boom Power (붐붐파워)	SBS Power FM and SBS Love FM (Note: Starting from June 2, 2020, the show will simultaneously broadcast on 2 different radio channels under SBS.)

== Discography ==
=== Solo Activities ===
==== Singles ====
- "Boom Up" – June 26, 2006
- "Shout Out" (질러) – March 28, 2007
- "Boom's Friend Nyugyu Song" (붐친구 뉴규쏭) – April 16, 2009
- "Boom's Back" (붐스백) – September 7, 2011
- "Leave it to Play" (놀게 냅둬) ft. Gaeko of Dynamic Duo – July 10, 2012
- "Beautiful" (예쁘긴 했지) – November 27, 2012
- "Boy Next Door" (옆집오빠) – February 19, 2018

==== EP ====
- I Don't Know How to Love Her (여자를 모른다) – May 16, 2013

==== As Featuring Artist ====
- Kim Sung-soo – "The F4 Story" (ft. Boom) – March 30, 2009

==== As Narrator ====
- Xia – "Funny Song" (이 노래 웃기지?) (Narr. Boom) – July 15, 2013

=== Group Activities ===
==== Key (1997–1998) ====
- Key 1 – 1997
- Key 2 (Forever Love) – August 1998

==== Nuclear (1999) ====
- Nuclear – November 1999

==== Lexa (2001–2002) ====
- Lexa – 2001

==== VISIT (Project Group) (2018) ====
- Because It's You (너라서) – October 22, 2018

== Awards and nominations ==
Year	Award	Category	Nomination	Result	Ref
2006	Mnet Asian Music Awards	New Singer of the Year	"Boom Up" ft. Kim Bum	Nominated	
2009	3rd SBS Entertainment Awards	Best Newcomer Award (Variety Show)	Strong Heart	Won	
2011	5th SBS Entertainment Awards	Excellence Award (Talk Show Category)	Strong Heart	Won	
2011	5th SBS Entertainment Awards	Netizen Popularity Award	Star King	Nominated	
2012	6th SBS Entertainment Awards	Best Entertainer Award (Talk show)	Strong Heart	Won	
2018	Melon Music Awards	Best Trot Award	"Boy Next Door"	Nominated	
2018	12th SBS Entertainment Awards	Radio DJ Award	SBS Power FM Boom Boom Power	Won	
2019	19th MBC Entertainment Awards	Best Couple Award with Seo Jang-hoon	Broadcasting on Your Side	Nominated	
2019	19th MBC Entertainment Awards	Excellence Award in Variety Category (Male)	Broadcasting on Your Side	Nominated	
2020	20th MBC Entertainment Awards	Excellent Awards in Variety Show (Male)	Where is My Home; Buddy Into the Wild	Won	
2021	15th SBS Entertainment Awards	Radio DJ Award - SBS Power FM	Boom Boom Power	Won	
2021	21st MBC Entertainment Awards	MC Award (Male)	Where is My Home; I'm Glad We Don't Fight	Won	
2022	2022 KBS Entertainment Awards	Excellence Award in Show and Variety Category	Stars' Top Recipe at Fun-Staurant	Nominated	
2022	2022 MBC Entertainment Awards	Top Excellence Award, Variety Category – Male	It's Good If We Don't Fight and Where is My Home	Won	
2025	KBS Entertainment Awards	Entertainer of the Year	Stars' Top Recipe at Fun-Staurant	Won	
