= Bangpan Boys =

South Korean web series

- Poster
- Also known as: BPS
- Original title: 방판소년단
- Genre: Web television
- Presented by: Boom; Yoo Jae-hwan; Jaehyo
- Country of origin: South Korea
- Original language: Korean
- No. of seasons: 1
- No. of episodes: 79

Production
- Production location: South Korea

Original release
- Network: SBS Plus Hanbbum TV
- Release: June 4 – December 12, 2018

Bangpan Boys (Korean: 방판소년단) or BPS for short, is a South Korean Web television program aired on SBS Plus Hanbbum TV hosted by Boom, Yoo Jae-hwan and Block B's Jaehyo. It is aired every Monday through Wednesday at 11.00am KST on V Live and Naver TV, 5.00pm KST on YouTube and GOMTV.

== Synopsis ==
This is a web television about the 3 hosts who tries to earn a sum of money to produce a song through selling the sponsored products door-to-door either to the public or to the different celebrities.

== Changes of Hosts ==
On Episode 12, it was mentioned that Sam Okyere had since left the show due to his busy schedule, with Christian Burgos taking over his position.

On Episode 40, it was mentioned that Christian Burgos had left the show due to his busy schedule in Mexico, with Block B's Jaehyo taking over the MC position permanently from Episode 43 onward after being chosen through the 'New Member Interview'.

== Debut ==
On October 16, 2018, the 3 hosts had officially debut with their first single under the group name called 'VISIT' through SBS MTV's The Show.

On October 21, 2018, the single is made available on all major music sites.

== Hosts ==
=== Current ===
- Boom (Ep 1 - 79)
- Yoo Jae-hwan (Ep 1 - 79)
- Block B's Jaehyo (Ep 43 - 79)

=== Former ===
- Sam Okyere (Ep 1 - Ep 11)
- Christian Burgos (Ep 12 - Ep 39)

== Episodes ==
No.	Title	Original release date
1	BangPanBoys First Meeting	June 4, 2018
2	BangPanBoys First Meeting Continues	June 5, 2018
3	The Long Awaited First Day of Sales for BPS	June 11, 2018
4	TBA	June 11, 2018
5	TBA	June 12, 2018
6	Pet Food Sales, Sampling Time	June 13, 2018
7	TBA	June 18, 2018
8	TBA	June 19, 2018
9	TBA	June 19, 2018
10	TBA	June 20, 2018
11	TBA	June 20, 2018
12	BPS, new member! (Park Seo Joon B.F) congregate dining	July 16, 2018
13	BPS, to IU clingy BPS want door-to-door sales	July 17, 2018
14	Innocent OH MY GIRL, fell into a trap of the door-to-door sales	July 18, 2018
15	Otaku & Grandma Taste DIA Member??	July 23, 2018
16	DIA, why is this coming out of bed?	July 24, 2018
17	DIA, this will make you World No.1 idol	July 25, 2018
18	A.C.E Dorms Attack! A.C.E No Makeup Face!	July 30, 2018
19	A.C.E WOW, the Mattress is WOW	July 31, 2018
20	BPS, copied 'Please give me one meal'? Look who's here?!!	August 1, 2018
21	BPS, debut?! The beginning of Released a song	August 1, 2018
22	Why are you appearing from there? (feat. Big and Handsome)	August 6, 2018
23	Unexpected Global Sales (Chinese person Big Welcome)	August 7, 2018
24	It seems like he's good at singing (It's pretty good)	August 8, 2018
25	Girlfriend X BPS, Legendary Sales Collaboration	August 13, 2018
26	The story BPS became fundraising hero	August 13, 2018
27	BPS's Endless love to Girlfriend	August 14, 2018
28	YJH, losing his mind while spinning in Pole Academy	August 15, 2018
29	A surprise attack!! UNB house~	August 20, 2018
30	Releasing UNB's all hidden talents!	August 20, 2018
31	TBA	August 21, 2018
32	Sohee & Suhyun, get drenched with water and get betrayed?	August 22, 2018
33	CEO of THE BLACK SWAN is handsome and tall.	August 27, 2018
34	Reason of them getting soaking wet at the baseball park?	August 28, 2018
35	Challenge street sales at Yuntral-park for the first time!	August 29, 2018
36	Selling LED masks to fromis_9 (※a.k.a. Masked Singer)	September 3, 2018
37	Sae-rom's sexy dance shocks everyone	September 4, 2018
38	Cutie cute cute Na-kyoung? Made UL stop filming?	September 5, 2018
39	When B.P.S. meets ballad (ft. water hyacinth)	September 10, 2018
40	New Member Interview: Hojung from UNB VS JOEL	September 11, 2018
41	Let out the beagle-like charm! Meet 1N2IT's mood makers	September 11, 2018
42	Is it really Block-B? Jaehyo shows up in B.P.S.	September 12, 2018
43	Here comes the youngest B.P.S. member! Block-B Jaehyo!	September 17, 2018
44	KARD never takes out a credit CARD	September 18, 2018
45	Revealing Jaehyo's best female friend	September 19, 2018
46	KNK - a seller to a customer	October 1, 2018
47	'KNK & B.P.S.' sweeps Kondae area hotdogs	October 2, 2018
48	KNK road concert! On the streets of Kondae	October 3, 2018
49	Hangover drinks in OH MY GIRL's waiting room?	October 8, 2018
50	A guy spends 270 thousand won on OH MY GIRL	October 9, 2018
51	Avatar in Yeontral Park?	October 10, 2018
52	An idol admits plastic surgery a karaoke with Greg	October 15, 2018
53	Hey, we're singers too! (Heavily supported by Greg)	October 16, 2018
54	Episode of photographer Jaehyo becoming obsessed	October 17, 2018
55	Nevermind Song Sohee! All about a Korean traditional music normie	October 22, 2018
Special Ep	VISIT on SBS MTV 'The Show'	October 22, 2018
56	About a Yeonnam-dong eccentric man	October 23, 2018
57	A man keels down to a stranger	October 24, 2018
58	Pestering a Porsche Owner	October 29, 2018
59	Selling to a 'tsunere'	October 30, 2018
60	Getting rid of scuffs on your car equals a GF	October 31, 2018
61	Goddess Suji appears in Daehangno	November 5, 2018
62	A normie shouts Hallelujah in Daehangno	November 6, 2018
63	A celebrity gets slapped in downtown	November 7, 2018
64	Seo-jin with BPS?	November 12, 2018
65	TBA	November 13, 2018
66	Breaking News! Dissonance between 1N2T members	November 14, 2018
67	April likes kissing?	November 19, 2018
68	April Chaekyung becomes a mom?!	November 20, 2018
69	BPS meets a beautiful stewardess-to-be	November 21, 2018
70	Seoul Uni's Sunmi appears?!	November 26, 2018
71	BlockB Jae-hyo gets angry from talking about GF	November 27, 2018
72	Jung Hae-in comes out from a group of supermodels?	November 27, 2018
73	Supermodels mades Jae-hyo "losers"	November 28, 2018
74	Napping in a Lamborghini	December 3, 2018
75	Block B's Jae-hyo's favorite restaurant	December 4, 2018
76	What real men do! (feat. Fast and Furious)	December 5, 2018
77	A card shark all at sea - all in	December 10, 2018
78	A K-pop idol's dream first ever Beijing duck	December 11, 2018
79	Jae-hyo's last episode before military service (Last ep of BPS)	December 12, 2018

== Guests ==
Name	Episode(s)	Notes/Ref.
Kim Yeong-hee	3 - 4	
DIA	14 - 17	
ACE	18 - 19	All members
Park Chul	22	
G-Friend	25 - 27	
UNB	29 - 31	
Lee Su-hyun	32	
Elris' Sohee	32	
Fromis 9	36 - 38	
JOEL	41	Appeared for the New Member Interview
UNB's Go Ho-jung	41	Appeared for the New Member Interview
IN2IT's Inpyo	41	Appeared for the New Member Interview
IN2IT's Inho	41	Appeared for the New Member Interview
Block B's Jaehyo	42	Appeared for the New Member Interview
KARD	44	All members
Hong Ji-soo	45	
KNK	46 - 48	
OH MY GIRL	49 - 50	
Greg	52 - 53	
Shin Su-ji	61 - 62	
IN2IT	63 - 66	All members
April	67 - 68	

== Advertising Companies ==
Companies	Episode(s)
GINIPET Dog Food	3 - 6
Elroel	7 - 11, 67 - 69, 79
Coway	14 - 20
BiiON	22 - 24
Loveydovely	25 - 28
CALOBYE	29 - 32
THE BLACK SWAN	33 - 35
DAILY CUT	61 - 62
Dr JAYJUN	63 - 66
Sofaskins	70 - 73
Leaders	70 - 73
BODFRIEND	74
WELLNESS	74
Crab Jack	75
Shinhwa World	78
Jeju Shinhwa World	79

== Discography ==
Title	Year	Peak chart positions	Sales (DL)	Featured Artist(s)	Album
Title	Year	KOR	Sales (DL)	Featured Artist(s)	Album
"너라서"	2018	—	—N/a	Greg	Non-single Album
