= New Journey to the West =

South Korean variety show

- Official poster for Season 8
- Hangul: 신서유기
- Hanja: 新西遊記
- RR: Sinseoyugi
- MR: Sinsŏyugi
- Genre: Variety show Travel documentary
- Written by: Lee Woo-jung; Choi Jae-young
- Directed by: Na Young-seok; Shin Hyo-jung (season 1-6); Park Hyun-yong (season 7-8)
- Starring: Kang Ho-dong; Lee Soo-geun; Eun Ji-won; Ahn Jae-hyun; Cho Kyu-hyun; Song Min-ho; P.O
- Country of origin: South Korea
- Original language: Korean
- No. of seasons: 8
- No. of episodes: 64 (list of episodes)

Production
- Production locations: Xi'an, China; Chengdu & Lijiang, China; Guilin & Xiamen, China; Hanoi, Cat Ba, Hai Phong & Sa Pa, Vietnam; Hong Kong, China; Hokkaido, Japan & South Korea
- Running time: 5-10 minutes each video, 5 videos every release on Friday at 10 a.m. (KST) (Season 1) 80–90 minutes per episode (Season 1-8)

Original release
- Network: tvN
- Release: 8 April 2016 – 18 December 2020

New Journey to the West (Korean: 신서유기) is a South Korean travel-reality show that airs on tvN. This program started broadcasting on September 4, 2015, and has currently aired for 8 Seasons.

New Journey to the West's cast members are Kang Ho-dong, Lee Soo-geun, Eun Ji-won, Ahn Jae-hyun, Cho Kyu-hyun, Song Min-ho, and Pyo Ji-hoon. Inspired by the famous Chinese novel Journey to the West, in each season every cast member was dressed as a certain character and traveled to places on a mission to find mystical dragon balls. They must complete a task in order to receive dragon balls. If the members successfully gather seven dragon balls, their wishes would be granted. Over the years, this program has gained popularity and garnered high viewer ratings with its fresh ideas, fluid storyline, varying roles, and fun costumes.

== History ==
New Journey to the West was first announced on 16 July 2015, with Na Young-seok as the chief director. The show's initial concept came from one of the original member, Lee Seung-gi, which was to travel with the other cast members and film all their activities. It was originally broadcast online via Naver TVCast and was the first project from "tvN Go", a digital-content brand from cable channel tvN.

The show's first season reunites the former 2 Days & 1 Night Season 1 members Lee Seung-gi, Kang Ho-dong, Eun Ji-won and Lee Soo-geun. The four members each take one of the characters from the classic 16th-century Chinese novel Journey to the West as they go on a 5-days and 4 night backpacking trip through Xi'an, China, to play various games. The show was a success with over 42 million views on Naver TV Cast and 10 million views on Chinese portal site QQ.

After gaining positive response on the first season, the second season of the show was filmed in Chengdu, which included a new cast member Ahn Jae-hyun (replacing Lee Seung-gi who left for military conscription). Aside from airing on online platforms, the show was aired on cable channel tvN. It garnered over 100 million views in China. The third season of the show, added boy band members Kyuhyun (Super Junior) and Mino (Winner), filmed in Guilin. The fourth season of the show was filmed in Vietnam. The fifth season was filmed in Hong Kong with a new member P.O (Block B), replacing Kyuhyun who could not participate due to his mandatory military service. Then, it is continuously followed with the sixth season that was filmed in Hokkaido. The show returns for the seventh season in October 2019, with a returning Cho Kyu-hyun and was set in South Korea. However, Ahn Jae-hyun did not participate in the seventh and eighth season due to his personal family issue.

== Series overview ==
Series	Episodes	Originally released			Broadcast Time (KST)
Series	Episodes	First released	Last released	Network	Broadcast Time (KST)
1	23	4 September 2015	2 October 2015	Naver TVCast	Friday 10:00 AM
1	2	8 April 2016	15 April 2016	tvN	Friday 9:45 PM
2	9	19 April 2016	14 June 2016	Naver TVCast	Tuesday 10:00 AM
2	9	22 April 2016	17 June 2016	tvN	Friday 9:45 PM
2.5	7	5 January 2017	6 January 2017	Naver TVCast	Thursday & Friday 10:00 AM
3	10	8 January 2017	12 March 2017	tvN	Sunday 9:20 PM
4	11	13 June 2017	2 August 2017	tvN	Tuesday 9:30 PM
5 & 6	10	30 September 2018	2 December 2018	tvN	Sunday 10:40 PM
7	11	25 October 2019	3 January 2020	tvN	Friday 9:10 PM
8	11	9 October 2020	18 December 2020	tvN	Friday 9:10 PM

== Cast ==
Members
Members	Season 1	Season 2		Season 3		Season 4		Season 5	Season 6
Members	Xi'an	Chengdu	Lijiang	Guilin	Xiamen	Hanoi, Hai Phong	Sa Pa	Hong Kong	Hokkaido
Kang Ho-dong	Zhu Bajie		Sun Wukong	Zhu Bajie	Sun Wukong	Zhu Bajie	Sun Wukong	Kaonashi (No-Face)	Watermelon
Lee Soo-geun	Sun Wukong	Monk Xuan Zhang	Sha Wujing	Master Roshi	Sha Wujing	Piccolo	Krillin	Chucky	Pear
Eun Ji-won （Sechs Kies）	Sha Wujing	Sun Wukong	Monk Xuan Zhang	Bulma	Monk Xuan Zhang	Sun Wukong	Sha Wujing	Grim Reaper (Death Angel)	Farmer
Kyuhyun （Super Junior）	—N/a			Sun Wukong	Zhu Bajie	Sha Wujing	Zhu Bajie	—N/a	
Song Mino （Winner）	—N/a			Sha Wujing	Bulma	Krillin	Piccolo	Virgin Female; Ghost	Grape
P.O （Block B）	—N/a							Dracula	Sprouts
Ahn Jae-hyun	—N/a	Sha Wujing	Zhu Bajie	Monk Xuan Zhang	Master Roshi	Monk Xuan Zhang		Chinese Zombie	Peach
Lee Seung-gi	Monk Xuan Zhang	—N/a							

Members
Members	Season 7				Season 8	
Members	Homecoming	Retro Special	Global Special	Cinema Special	Tale of Hengbu	Dragon King
Kang Ho-dong	Shin Myohan	Park Jin-young	Panda King	Choi Ik-hyun	Heungbu's son	Rock bream
Lee Soo-geun	Knee-drop Guru	Lee Jung-hyun	Sugeuras	Na'vi	Gourd	Hijiki
Eun Ji-won （Sechs Kies）	Gandalf	Rain	Santa Claus	Elliott	Swallow	Dragon King
Kyuhyun （Super Junior）	Genie	Kang Joon-sang (Note: Character played by Bae Yong-joon in Winter Sonata)	Statue of Liberty	Joker	Nolbu's wife	Black sea bream
Song Mino （Winner）	Radish Guru	Red Devil	Cleopatra	Jack Sparrow	Heungbu	Terrapin
P.O （Block B）	Cabbage Guru	Song Eun-chae (Note: Character played by Im Soo-jung in I'm Sorry, I Love You)	Pharaoh	Olaf	Nolbu	Red sea bream
Ahn Jae-hyun	—N/a					

== Story plot ==
=== Season 1 ===
In Season 1, Lee Seung Gi plays Tang Sanzang (a Buddhist monk in the novel) who leads and worries constantly about the monsters hyungs (his co-cast members) who do not listen to him. Lee Soo Geun plays Sun Wukong a monkey character with the greatest sin, Eun Ji Won plays Sha Wujing (a celestial being) who is either immature or genius villain, and Kang Ho Dong plays Zhu Bajie (a pig character) with low brain power but great strength and appetite. Together, they take a journey to the west (Xi'an, China) while completing various missions to find seven dragon balls which can grant wishes for those who collect them.

Na Young Suk PD expressed, "The four are too familiar with each other, and they know what each other is thinking just from looking at each other's eyes. Everyone had a great and fun time during the 5 days four nights trip. We are working hard on the post-production at the moment, so that the viewers can experience the fun that we all had." Prior to the start of Season 2, tvN rebroadcast the online version of Season 1 to the TV by compiling it to two episodes on 8 and 15 April 2016.

=== Season 2 to 4 ===
In Season 2 to 4, the show followed the similar concept as Season 1 as they travelled with new characters and new cast members to several parts of China and Vietnam to find the seven dragon balls.

In Season 2, Kang Ho-dong, Eun Ji-won and Lee Soo-geun with Ahn Jae-hyun (replacing Lee Seung-gi) travel to China (Chengdu and Lijiang). Each member takes on one of the characters as in Season 1 and played various games. The season started on 22 April and ended on 17 June 2016. Simultaneously, the show was also broadcast online via Naver TVCast between 19 April and 14 June 2016.

Season 2.5 consists of two new members (Mino and Kyuhyun) for familiarizing with the current members from Season 2.

In Season 3, Kang Ho-dong, Eun Ji-won, Lee Soo-geun, Ahn Jae-hyun, Mino and Kyuhyun travel to China (Guilin and Xiamen). New characters (Master Roshi and Bulma) were also introduced. The season started on 8 January and ended on 12 March 2017.

In Season 4, the show continued with the same members from Season 3 as the whole group takes a journey to Vietnam. The season started on 13 June and ended on 22 August 2017. With the new theme of "The apocalypse of Hell", each member has his new character: Kang Ho-dong plays Zhu Bajie; Lee Soo-geun plays Piccolo; Eun Ji-won plays Sun Wukong; Ahn Jae-hyun plays monk Xuan Zhang; Kyuhyun plays Sha Wujing; and since Min-ho loses the Ping-pong competition and shaves his hair, he plays the character of Krillin. In Gangshi Game, members complete all the tasks in time, Mino accurately selects the gift buttons (luxury cars) after spinning 15 turns around. Instead of giving expensive cars, Na Young-suk PD promises to give them dragon balls and other rewards. Min-ho also receives a new nickname as Song Garak (Song finger). In this Season, members successfully collect all seven dragon balls and receive their rewards from the production team. Na Young-suk PD promises to put "Kang's Kitchen" and "Youth Over Flowers" into schedule.

=== Season 5, 6 and 6.5 ===
In Season 5 and 6, new sets of characters and themes (Ghost Special and Season of Harvest) were introduced as the cast members traveled to Hong Kong and Hokkaido. As Kyuhyun started his military conscription, P.O joined in as a replacement and guest member.

In Season 5, they make a journey to Hong Kong (China) with a new theme of "Ghost Special or Horror Special". In Season 6, members travelled to Hokkaido (Japan) with a new theme of "Geobong Geobong Geobong (Kyoho grape)". Then in Season 6.5, members return to Seoul (South Korea). They spend time together in a house and play different games to win the rewards. The season started on 30 September and ended on 2 December 2018. At the end of the show, the production team announced that "Kang's Kitchen 2" would return soon.

Theme	Plot
Ghost Special	Each member has his new character: Kang Ho-dong plays Kaonashi (No-Face); Lee Soo-geun plays Chucky; Eun Ji-won plays Grim Reaper (Death Angel); Ahn Jae-hyun plays Chinese Zombie; Song Min-ho plays Virgin Female Ghost; and P.O plays as Dracula. In the final mission, members did not receive the dragon balls as Lee Soo-geun and Song Min-ho failed fast changing of clothing challenge in a given time. Na Young-suk PD suddenly announces that Season 5 is over and Season 6 starts.
Season of Harvest	Each member dresses up as a fruit: Kang Ho-dong plays watermelon; Lee Soo-geun plays pear; Eun Ji-won plays farmer; Ahn Jae-hyun plays peach; Song Min-ho plays grape; and P.O plays sprout. In this Season, members pair up as teams to play games. In the game, Lee Soo-geun becomes the "Golden Hand" since he picks out 2 super rewards out of 3 in a hundred options.

=== Season 7 ===
In Season 7, Kang Ho-dong, Lee Soo-geun, Eun Ji-won, Song Mino, P.O, and a returning Cho Kyu-hyun travel around South Korea. The season started on 25 October 2019 and ended on 3 January 2020. In this season, the show was filmed in South Korea with the theme "Homecoming" and Na PD got the concept from the Spider-Man: Homecoming.

Theme	Plot
Homecoming	The dragon balls have fallen into Mount Gyeryong of South Korea and each member will become a spiritual guru. The members played "Signal Quiz" as the character selection game. Kang Ho-dong plays Shin Myohan; Lee Soo-geun plays Knee-drop Guru; Eun Ji-won plays Gandalf; Cho Kyuhyun plays Genie of the Lamp; Song Mino plays Radish Guru and P.O plays as Cabbage Guru.
Retro Special	The members played "Go Back Jump" as the character selection game. Kang Ho-dong plays Park Jin-young; Lee Soo-geun plays Lee Jung-hyun; Eun Ji-won plays Rain; Cho Kyuhyun plays Bae Yong-joon; Song Mino plays Red Devil and P.O plays as Im Soo-jung.
Innocence Special	The Innocence Special was initially not able to be accomplished as the members won the Great Release of Dragon Balls games and ended the filming earlier. After Na PD revealed that the production team has previously agreed with the sponsor to have the members to appear on a costume parade in Yong-in for Halloween, the members agreed after Na PD provided a sumptuous breakfast for the members. Kang Ho-dong plays Papa Smurf; Lee Soo-geun plays Smurfette; Eun Ji-won plays Grouchy Smurf; Cho Kyuhyun plays Brainy Smurf; Song Mino plays Hefty Smurf and P.O plays as Vanity Smurf.
Global Special	The members played "Classical Music Quiz" as the character selection game. Kang Ho-dong plays Panda; Lee Soo-geun plays Sugeuras; Eun Ji-won plays Santa Claus; Cho Kyuhyun plays Statue of Liberty; Song Mino plays Cleopatra and P.O plays as Pharaoh.
Cinema Special	The members played "Guess the Movie" quiz as the character selection game. Kang Ho-dong plays Choi Ik-hyun; Lee Soo-geun plays Na'vi; Eun Ji-won plays Elliott; Cho Kyuhyun plays Joker; Song Mino plays Jack Sparrow and P.O plays Olaf.

=== Season 8 ===
In Season 8, current members from Season 7 returned. The theme is based on Korean traditional fairytale and is being filmed in South Korea. The season started on 9 October 2020 (Hangeul Day) and ended on 18 December 2020.

Theme	Plot
Tale of Hengbu	The members played "Boom Boom game" as the character selection game for Tale of Hengbu, Kang Ho-dong plays Heungbu's son; Lee Soo-geun plays the gourd; Eun Ji-won plays the swallow; Cho Kyuhyun plays Nolbu's wife; Song Min-no plays Heungbu and P.O plays Nolbu.
Dragon King and his friends	The members had an election on who will be the Dragon King and the elected Dragon King will decide on the remaining characters. Kang Ho-dong plays Rock bream; Lee Soo-geun plays the Hijiki; Eun Ji-won plays the Dragon King; Cho Kyuhyun plays Black sea bream; Song Min-no plays Terrapin and P.O plays Red sea bream.

== Production ==
=== Season 1 ===
This show reunites four former cast members of the golden age of KBS '2 Days & 1 Night' in Season 1. On 16 July 2015, tvN announced that Na Young Seok PD will show a new form of variety program in fall through internet contents called 'New Journey to The West'. The production crew stated, "We invested [in the show] as a new format that will broadcast on the internet instead of TV. Right now, we are considering recruiting Lee Soo Geun, and Eun Ji Won in addition to Kang Ho Dong and Lee Seung Gi. There will be no more additions after four members are confirmed."

A CJ E&M official told Sports Chosun on 23 July 2015, 'New Journey to the West' is holding the first meeting of the members. On 5 August, a source involved in broadcasting said that Lee Seung Gi, Kang Ho Dong, Lee Soo Geun, Eun Ji Won, and Na Young Suk leave for China on 6 August to begin filming. Which later revealed that they heading to Xi'an, a city in China, for 5 days filming.

tvN announced on 18 August 2015 that "New Journey to the West" will be released exclusively through PC and mobile Naver TVCast in early September. It marked this show as the first South Korean variety show created by a TV network, tvN, to be broadcast exclusively online.

New Journey to the West production crew and members make their first official appearance through a press conference held at 63 Convention Center on the afternoon of 1 September 2015. The press conference go live on Tuesday at 2 p.m. on Naver and V app at the same time.

The show also streamed exclusively on Tencent's QQ.com in China, simultaneously with its run on South Korean portal website Naver. Seo Jang-Ho, the head of international sales and acquisitions at CJ E&M, said, "We are excited to introduce New Journey to the West to Chinese viewers through Tencent, one of the largest online platforms in the country. As the show is CJ E&M's highly anticipated digital content of the year, we hope for its successful reception in China."

In the show press conference, Director Na said that there was no step-by-step casting process. "It all just happened very naturally when Lee Seung-gi mentioned going on a trip with the old members over a casual dinner," Na explained. "We then talked about filming it, but because it would lack completeness as a TV show, we decided to use the Internet platform." Na stated that they wanted to make a program that is new in every ways, including genre and format. Providing busy businessmen and students with short break in the midst of their hectic daily routines. The concept about five new clips at once time release, with each clip to be about ten minutes long, make those who cannot afford the time to watch all of the clips in order can just randomly pick whatever looks good for them.

== Episodes ==
=== Season 1 ===
Destinations:Xi'an, China

List of episodes (season 1)

Roles
Role	Member
Zhu Bajie	Kang Hodong
Monk Xuan Zhang	Lee Seunggi
Sun Wukong	Lee Soogeun
Sha Wujin	Eun Jiwon

Naver TVCast
Release date	Episode	Title
4 September 2015	1	The Beginning of a Legend
4 September 2015	2	Find the Monkey King, the greatest sinner
4 September 2015	3	New Journey to the West Game Instruction Manual
4 September 2015	4	Good Things to Know Before the Race
4 September 2015	5	Finally China! Monk Tang Sanzang Race - Part 1
11 September 2015	6	The winner is Lee Seung Gi anyway! Monk Tang Sanzang Race - Part 2
11 September 2015	7	Ho Dong does it too, part 1! Kang Ho Dong's first ever errand
11 September 2015	8	The Birth of Zhu Bajie
11 September 2015	9	First Dragon Ball Mission! What happened at DeFaChang?!
11 September 2015	10	Sleeping together after 5 years! Monsters' First Night
18 September 2015	11	Xi'an City Wall tour
18 September 2015	12	Exploring The Terracotta Army
18 September 2015	13	Second Dragon Ball Mission
18 September 2015	14	A Trembling night with the massager!
18 September 2015	15	Who's responsible for the missing shoes?!
22 September 2015	11-1 (Special)	Time limit is 30 minutes! Dragon Ball Individual Mission!
25 September 2015	16	Culprit finally revealed! And breakfast at opposite extremes!
25 September 2015	17	Relay Individual Mission! HoDong's desperate struggle with an ATM!
25 September 2015	18	Extraordinary Mission! Look for KyungMo PD!
25 September 2015	19	Guess it right to eat! Who is this person?
29 September 2015	Chuseok Special	Home Cooking Monk Lee
2 October 2015	20	Night of Wishes! Crazy guy Eun Ji Won's wish is?
2 October 2015	21	Final Mission! Fate Up to HoDong!
2 October 2015	22	It's All Over But Let's Still Do One Quiz
2 October 2015	Final	Epilogue Made to Not Waste What Was Filmed (End)

tvN
Release date	Episode
8 April 2016	1
15 April 2016	2

=== Season 2 ===
Destinations:China (Chengdu and Lijiang)

List of episodes (season 2)

Episode 1(Highlights):- The new member Ahn jayeon joins the show and they chose the roles. They added the condition for the role Monk Xuan Zhang That he will have to shave his hair Aka Lee soogeun. After reaching china the crew dumps them after some time and told them to find their lodging with no money given. They mess up the ATM card and it gets blocked. And the crew gives them a second chance they win with the help of local fans who hand guides them to their Guest house.

Roles
Role	First part member	Second part member
Zhu Bajie	Kang Hodong	Ahn Jaehyun
Monk Xuan Zhang	Lee Soogeun	Ahn Jaehyun > Eun Jiwon
Sun Wukong	Eun Jiwon	Kang Hodong
Sha Wujing	Ahn Jaehyun	Lee Soogeun

Release date	Episode
22 April 2016	1
29 April 2016	2
6 May 2016	3
13 May 2016	4
20 May 2016	5
27 May 2016	6
3 June 2016	7
10 June 2016	8
17 June 2016	9

=== Season 2.5 ===
Season 2.5 consisted of 7 episode internet exclusive clips familiarizing the 2 new cast members, Cho Kyuhyun and Song Minho to the show among other things.

It aired on Naver TVCast between 5 and 6 January 2017.

=== Season 3 ===
Destinations:China (Guilin and Xiamen)

List of episodes (season 3)

Roles
Role	First part member	Second part member
*new* Master Roshi	Lee Soogeun	Ahn Jaehyun
*new* Bulma	Eun Jiwon	Song Minho
Zhu Bajie	Kang Hodong	Cho Kyuhyun
Monk Xuan Zhang	Ahn Jaehyun	Eun Jiwon
Sun Wukong	Cho Kyuhyun	Kang Hodong
Sha Wujin	Song Minho	Lee Soogeun

Release date	Episode
8 January 2017	1
15 January 2017	2
22 January 2017	3
29 January 2017	4
5 February 2017	5
12 February 2017	6
19 February 2017	7
26 February 2017	8
5 March 2017	9
12 March 2017	10

=== Season 4 ===
Destinations: Vietnam (Hanoi, Cat Ba, Hai Phong and Sa Pa). Theme: Hell's Apocalypse

List of episodes (season 4)

Roles
Role	First part member	Second part member
*new* Piccolo	Lee Soogeun	Lee Soogeun > Song Minho
*new* Krillin	Song Minho	Song Minho > Lee Soogeun
Zhu Bajie	Kang Hodong	Cho Kyuhyun
Monk Xuan Zhang	Ahn Jaehyun	Ahn Jaehyun
Sun Wukong→*new* Goku	Eun Jiwon	Kang Hodong
Sha Wujin	Cho Kyuhyun	Eun Jiwon

Release date	Episode	Recap
13 June 2017	1	Arriving in Hanoi, Vietnam. Sun Wukong has evolve to become Goku
20 June 2017	2	Arrival at the Army Hotel and Dragon Ball Games
27 June 2017	3	Let's go to Cat Ba Island
4 July 2017	4	Cat Ba Island: Cone Game and Guess Who Quiz
11 July 2017	5	The city of water - Hai Phong and The first Worlds' Best Martial Arts Competition
18 July 2017	6	Part 1 Ending, Dragon Ball Game
25 July 2017	7	Part 2 Beginning, Murder mystery train to Sa Pa, Vietnam
1 August 2017	8	Sa Pa: Dinner game and morning mission
8 August 2017	9	Dormammu, I've come to Bargain Game
15 August 2017	10	Part 2 Ending, Individual Dragon Ball Game
22 August 2017	11	Director's Cut

=== Season 5, 6 and 6.5 ===
Destinations: Hong Kong, Hokkaido and South Korea

List of episodes (season 5, 6 and 6.5)

Theme:

- Season 5 (Ghost Special or Horror Special)
- Season 6 (Season of Harvest)
- Season 6.5 (3 Wise Meals A day)

Roles
Character		Member	Notes
Hong Kong (Season 5)	Hokkaido (Season 6)	Member	Notes
*new* Kaonashi	*new* Watermelon	Kang Hodong	Old Boys Team
*new* Chucky	*new* Pear	Lee Soogeun	Old Boys Team
*new* Grim Reaper	*new* Farmer	Eun Jiwon	Old Boys Team
*new* Chinese Zombie	*new* Peach	Ahn Jaehyun	Young Boys Team
*new* Virgin Female Ghost	*new* Grape	Song Minho	Young Boys Team
*new* Dracula	*new* Sprouts	P.O	Young Boys Team

Release date	Episode	Recap
30 September 2018	1	Character selection and Ghost Olympiad. Soogeun won HK$300 as he chose not to "reincarnate" after winning the Ghost Olympiad.
7 October 2018	2	Arrive at Hong Kong (Day 1). Hodong won the first dragon ball for the team.
14 October 2018	3	Hong Kong (Day 2). Jiwon and Minho won HK$1,000, Hodong and Soogeun won HK$500, Jaehyun and P.O won HK$100 from the music & front seat quiz. They went for a lunch spree with the money they won on the double-decker bus.
21 October 2018	4	Hong Kong (Day 3 & 4). Kang Hodong won the second dragon ball for the team by correctly guessing five different brands of Korean ramen.
28 October 2018	5	Hong Kong (Day 4). Soogeun and Minho failed in the fast changing of clothing challenge. End of Season 5.
Release date	Episode	Recap
28 October 2018	5; S6 Ep 0	Start of Season 6.: Season of Harvest. Selection of new roles for Hokkaido via "Strawberry game".; Arrive at Hokkaido (Day 1).
4 November 2018	6; S6 Ep 1	Hokkaido (Day 1). Soogeun and Jiwon won 11,000円, Minho and P.O won 5,000円, Hodong and Jaehyun got nothing from the "Shout in Silence" game. They used the winning for their Day 2 breakfast. Hokkaido (Day 2). After breakfast, the cast had a movie quiz to get the best driver for the "Amazing Race" on a car. The final destination is at a sports park.
11 November 2018	7; S6 Ep 2	Hokkaido (Day 2). Minho and P.O came in first place with ten chances, Soogeun and Jiwon came in second place with five chances and Hodong and Jaehyun came in last with one chance in drawing the big prize at the end of the "Amazing Race". Jiwon won the Iceland trip in the draw. They played the cone game for a single chance to draw a prize in individual format which Soogeun won. He won an Alaska cruise in the draw. The cast played in the "3 on 3 Zombie" with Soogeun, Jaehyun and Minho winning the game. They had the pork belly meal while the rest of the cast are temporary stayed in the loft. The morning mission (Protect the Specialties of the Hokkaido) is to hide and preserve the items given by the production staff. Hokkaido (Day 3). P.O is the only cast that won the morning mission and got to eat a sumptuous breakfast. Hodong, Jiwon and P.O won the abbreviation quiz and got to eat a special ramen lunch.
18 November 2018	8; S6 Ep 3	Hokkaido (Day 3). The cast had a classical music quiz on the moving bus. Each cast member with the correct answer will alight the bus and return to the restaurant for a king pork rice bowl which will last for 30 minutes. South Korea (Day 1). Soogeun and Jiwon won several prizes in the Great lucky draw games. <Release of Dragon Ball> P.O & Hodong managed to win one dragon ball each but Minho did not manage to, thus ends the great release of dragon ball. Start of Season 6.5; Three Wise Meals A day special. Hodong selected P.O and Jiwon as team members while Soogeun paired up with Jaehyun and Minho. Hodong team arrived first at the final destination and get to eat a sumptuous lunch.
25 November 2018	9; S6 Ep 4	South Korea (Day 1). <Individual Mission> Each cast was given an individual mission to perform and only Hodong manage to succeed. Hodong won the chance to buy something from the live home shopping channel. <Individual Game> Each cast was to select any TV channel and the one with the most people on the screen wins. Jaehyun won the game and has to leave early in the following morning to go fishing on a boat. <Team Mission> Each cast member had to buy something from the mall to make gimbap without any prior discussion. All the cast managed to buy some ingredients for the dinner. South Korea (Day 2). Jaehyun woke up early and left the apartment with Na PD to go fishing at Anmyeondo Island. Jaehyun did not manage to catch any fish but Na PD caught several webfoot octopus and cuttlefish. Jaehyun ended up buying six blue crabs from the market. <Final Great Release of Dragon Ball> Jiwon, P.O and Minho each won a dragon ball. The season ended after Jaehyun failed "kicking the jegi back and forth" game.
2 December 2018	10; S6 Ep 5	Director's cut.

=== Season 7 ===
Destinations: South Korea. Theme: Homecoming, Retro Special, Innocence Special, Global Special and Cinema Special

List of episodes (season 7)

Roles: Homecoming
Role	Member
Shin Myohan	Kang Hodong
Knee-drop Guru	Lee Soogeun
Gandalf	Eun Jiwon
Genie of the Lamp	Cho Kyuhyun
Guru Radish	Song Minho
Guru Cabbage	P.O

Roles: Retro Special
Role	Member	Team
Park Jin-young	Kang Hodong	Team; Old Boys
Lee Jung-hyun	Lee Soogeun	Team; Old Boys
Rain	Eun Jiwon	Team; Old Boys
Bae Yong-joon	Cho Kyuhyun	Team; Young Boys
Red Devil	Song Minho	Team; Young Boys
Im Soo-jung	P.O	Team; Young Boys

Roles: Innocence Special
Role	Member
Papa Smurf	Kang Hodong
Smurfette	Lee Soogeun
Grouchy Smurf	Eun Jiwon
Brainy Smurf	Cho Kyuhyun
Hefty Smurf	Song Minho
Vanity Smurf	P.O

Roles: Global Special
Role	Member
Kang Panda from China	Kang Hodong
Santa Eun from Chimney	Eun Jiwon
Cleosongtra from Egypt	Song Minho
P.raoh from Egypt	P.O
Sugeuras from Mexico	Lee Soogeun
Statue Cho of Liberty from the States	Cho Kyuhyun

Roles: Cinema Special
Role	Member
Choi Ik-hyun of Nameless Gangster	Kang Hodong
Na'vi of Avatar	Lee Soogeun
Elliott of E.T.	Eun Jiwon
Joker of Batman	Cho Kyuhyun
Jack Sparrow of Pirates of the Caribbean	Song Minho
Olaf of Frozen	P.O

Release date	Episode	Recap
25 October 2019	1	Homecoming; Day 1: The members played 'Signal Quiz' to earn allowance. Signal Quiz is a game where the music is played, each member has to guess its program and channel. Minho won the quiz and got ₩100,000.; The members played Signal Quiz again as the character selection game.; After the make-up is completed (make-up artist is Minho), the members are split into groups of two.; Ho-dong and Kyuhyun will travel by an open-top sports car as both are symbol of wealth.; Mino and P.O will travel by a truck as they are the deities of agriculture.; Soogeun and Jiwon will travel by Renault-Samsung car as both characters are of East meet West.; Mino and P.O, Soogeun and Jiwon swapped the travel mode as Soogeun has the licence to drive the truck.; The members arrived at Hougwarts (a school for wizards) to attend the International Guru Symposium. They played a cone hat game to decide the sleeping conditions in the room.; During the dinner time game, the productions received 12 autumn specialty ingredients. The members will receive one ingredient if they answer correctly in "Guess Who Quiz".
1 November 2019	2	The members did not win any of the specialty ingredients and had ramyeon for dinner.; The members played the morning mission. The items are the autumn specialties from different regions. They can hide the items in the hallway or in the room.; In the end, all the members failed the morning mission.; The members sleep in the cone hat game that decide the sleeping conditions in the room.; Day 2: With the sound of the alarm, Na PD opens the "Nana Snack Bar" for the breakfast.; After breakfast, they played the scream in silence game.
8 November 2019	3	Jiwon, Mino and Kyuhyun choose the van that takes them to a famous jjamppong restaurant for lunch. Hodong, Soogeun and P.O choose the bus that takes them to deliver lunchboxes for the production staff.; As the members failed to win any of the speciality ingredients on Day 1, Na PD suggested to play a long jump with hat cone game. Kyuhyun, who win the game was entitle to three of the specialty ingredients.; Na PD added a second and third place game of "catch you own shoe". Mino gets second place and Jiwon, third place.; The members failed to complete the third game during the Great Release of Dragon Balls. Hence, this marked the end of the International Guru Symposium.; Retro Special: Two weeks later, the members meet up again for breakfast.; The members played a game to determine the costumes for the Retro Special.; The members are split up into group of three.; Hodong, Mino and P.O. (Team 1); Soogeun, Jiwon and Kyuhyun (Team 2); Both teams travel in older cars that are without GPS and their smartphone are also taken away from them. The members can use old mobile phone provided by the production staff.; The production staff will provide hints on the final location that are placed in their cars.
15 November 2019	4	After all the hints are given, both teams managed to guess the final location as Daeseong-ri train station. Team Kyuhyun arrived at the final destination ahead of Team P.O.; Two teams are formed (Old Boys vs Young Boys) for the dinner music challenge. The winning team of each round is entitled to some number of dinner.; For the morning mission, each member is given a special task to perform before breakfast. Only the first three to complete their mission are given breakfast.
22 November 2019	5	Mino, Kyuhun and Soogeun managed to complete their morning mission and were given a sumptuous breakfast.; In the nonsense quiz, two members will pair up to complete the retro mission.; Mino and P.O (Team 1); Hodong and Soogeun (Team 2); Kyuhyun and Jiwon (Team 3); Kyuhyun and Jiwon won the retro mission race after three rounds of missions, followed by Mino and P.O and Hodong and Soogeun.; The members failed to complete the second game during the Great Release of Dragon Balls.
29 November 2019	6	Innocence Special: Na PD started the episode with the third Great Release of Dragon Balls. If the members wins music quiz, they will end the filming earlier. Else, they will starts the Smurf Village episode.; The members completed the music quiz and Innocent quiz and therefore won all the Dragon Balls. Na PD agreed to the members' requests on their gift.; While the members were having their group selfie, Soogeun accidentally damaged Kyuhyun's cellphone. After a lengthy discussion, Na PD decided to buy a new phone for Kyuhyun.; The production team has rented a resting place for the members and Na PD suggested that the members should use the rented place and decide on their schedule for the day.; The members discuss with Na PD and the members allow the production team to finish filming in two hours in the rented place (Smurf Village).; The members did not win any side dish and end up having rice, sesame oil and gochujang for the dinner.; After the dinner, the members have a ten minute Innocence Debate that humans are basically good/evil.; Mino, Jiwon and Soogeun will represent the evil nature side.; P.O, Hodong and Kyuhyun will represent the good nature side.; The team that manage to convince production staff wins the debate. Final result is humans are basically evil and Mino, Jiwon and Soogeun win the debate.; The next game is Zombie game. One of the members is a zombie. Mino wins the game without becoming a zombie.
6 December 2019	7	Each member is given a task to complete within the remaining two hours of the filming time. Jiwon wins the game.; After the 2-hours filming, the members have the team dinner and karaoke session.; As the production team as agreed with the sponsor to have the members to appear on a costume parade in Yong-in, Na PD provided a sumptuous breakfast for the members.; The costume parade requires the members to a choreographed dance and the members learnt the dance steps with the help from Mino and Kyuhyun.; The members put on makeup and dress up as Smurfs for the costume parade.; Global Special: A few days later, the members meet up and have breakfast.; The members played Classical Music Quiz to determine their costumes for the Global Special.
13 December 2019	8	The members board the city bus to the French restaurant.; Hodong lose the general knowledge quiz and have to find his way to the French restaurant which is located next to the French Embassy. Hodong has to reach the restaurant within 30 minutes using public transport to earn a dragon ball.; Hodong win a dragon ball for completing his mission.; In the Guess Who quiz, the members gets to drink a cup of bubble tea of Taiwan each after 3 attempts.; At the Texas theme in Ganghwa island, the members played foot volleyball. Old Boys Team (Hodong, Soogeun and Jiwon) lose to the Young Boys Team (Kyuhyun Mino P.O) and have to sleep in outdoor tent.; Na PD give Hodong a secret mission to explain to the members on how to play the Three Words Game and 15 minutes later if the atmosphere is heated up, the members will received the second dragon ball.; The members did not win the dragon ball as the failed Hodong's secret mission.; At the Los Angeles theme, the members played the Soundtrack Quiz, Old Boys Team vs Young Boys Team for dinner.; At the Italy theme, the members played the two rounds of Mafia Game.
20 December 2019	9	Top 5 winners of the Mafia Game gets to eat a sumptuous breakfast for the next day.; At the China theme, the members played the Cauldron Game for the tie-breaker. Jiwon loses the game.; After the sumptuous breakfast, Soogeun change to his swimming attire and dips into the swimming pool at 4 °C.; Na PD challenge P.O to do the same as Soogeun and will get a dragon ball if he does not make a sound within 30 seconds. P.O failed eventually after last than 10 seconds in the pool.; Na PD challenge Hodong to get into the pool and will get 2 dragon balls if he does not make a sound within 20 seconds. Hodong succeed with the challenge. The members have collected 3 dragon balls in total.; Mino challenge himself and succeed with get into the pool without make a sound for 20 seconds for personal honour.; Initially, Na PD challenge Jiwon and Kyuhyun to get into the pool and will get a dragon ball if they do not make a sound within 20 seconds. Jiwon accidentally fell into the pool and Kyuhyun was perplexed on what to do next.; Na PD finally challenge the members that Kyuhyun to get into the pool and will get 2 dragon balls if he does not make a sound within 20 seconds and the remaining members will dive in.; The members win the 2 more dragon balls with a total of 5 dragon balls in total.; While the members get ready, a villain has captured Myohan and the members have 77 minutes to complete 3 missions to rescue Myohan. If they succeed in rescuing Myohan, they win a dragon ball.; First mission is "Cham Cham Cham Game". They succeed after 13th try.; Second mission is "Cone Hat Soccer". The members have to score a goal within a minute. They managed to succeed after 2 tries.; Final mission is "Group Skipping Rope". The members have to skip 20 times together to win the mission. They managed to succeed and three minutes left on the timer to safe Myohan. Hence getting the 6th dragon ball.; The members go to the Chinatown in Incheon. The dinner mission is "4 Syllables Relay Talking".; The "Guess Remains Quiz" is the final mission for the 7th dragon ball. They fail the mission and end the Global Special.
27 December 2019	10	Cinema Special: The members started out from Seoul Station to Miryang Station via train.; In the Guess the Movie quiz, members are paired up to compete for characters selection.; Hodong and Jiwon; Sooegeun and Kyuhyun; Mino and P.O; After putting on their character's costume and makeup, the members proceed to the base camp.; The members played Preference Shuffle to decide the room.; Kyuhyun sleeps alone; Hodong, Mino and Jiwon share a room; Sooegeun and P.O share a room; The production will re-create the food eaten in the some movies as the food for Cinema Dinner. Members will play Relay Talk to win the food.; After winning one of the food and a ramyeon set, the members played Find Your Partner game to have a Duet Singing Festival.; Soogeun and Jiwon; Hodong and Kyuhyun; Mino and P.O; Each team are given 30 minutes to practice and prepare for the duet singing. Soogeun & Jiwon win the duet singing competition.
3 January 2020	11	The members' wake-up mission is '2 vs 2 vs 2' (heading table-tennis match). The members are free to choose who they want to pair with, but they decided to pair with their duet singing partners.; Hodong and Kyuhyun lose the wake-up mission.; Director's cut.; The members lose the final Great Release of Dragon Balls.

=== Season 8 ===
Destinations: South Korea. Theme: Once Upon a Time, Retreat for Team Building, Dragon King and his friends (Once Upon a Time in the Sea)

List of episodes (season 8)

Roles: Tale of Hengbu
Role	Member
Heungbu's son	Kang Hodong
Gourd	Lee Soogeun
Swallow	Eun Jiwon
Nolbu's wife	Cho Kyuhyun
Heungbu	Song Mino
Nolbu	P.O

Roles: Dragon King
Role	Member
Rock bream	Kang Hodong
Hijiki	Lee Soogeun
Dragon King	Eun Jiwon
Black sea bream	Cho Kyuhyun
Terrapin	Song Mino
Red sea bream	P.O

Release date	Episode	Recap
9 October 2020	1	Tale of Hengbu; Day 1 (Jirisan): The members played Boom Boom game as the character selection game. Whoever gets it wrong will be out and last one standing will get to choose the character first.; For a chance to have a pancake for lunch (Na PD as the chef), the members played Complete the Phrase game.; The members get to drink espresso among the herbal tea, sophora root tea (a healthy but bitter taste tea).; The members are split up into group of 3 playing SNS Challenge.; Hodong, Soogeun and Mino (Team Hengbu); Jiwon, Kyuhyun and P.O. (Team Nolbu)
16 October 2020	2	Hodong was given a task by Na PD to give the morning mission briefing.
16 October 2020	2	Day 2: The morning mission is to stay on the Unicorn, flamingo or rhino floats within 10 minutes. Mino and Kyuhyun were the winners in the mission and was given chicken soup for breakfast.; Kyuhyun wins the "Folktale Quiz" to get to eat marsh clam soup, but he will need to complete a tiny mission at the restaurant to win the reward.; Kyuhyun will be live streaming on "LAN Cable Food Talk" while other members watch the live stream on the bus.; Kyuhyun explain the nutrition benefit of marsh clam soup while eating. At the peak of the live streaming, there were 29,000 viewers.; Hodong wins the "Common Knowledge Quiz" to get to eat jajangmyeon and tangsuyuk in the Chinese restaurant on a live streaming channel.; Hodong explain the taste of the jajangmyeon and tangsuyuk on the live streaming.; After Hodong returned to the bus, the other members tried to make fun of Mino about him dosing off during Hodong's live streaming.; In the final quiz of "Variety Show Initial Quiz", the loser of the quiz will host the live streaming. Jiwon lose the quiz and get to do live streaming in the cafe.; Jiwon make a slapstick comedy of a sparrow walking onto the window pane in the cafe.; Jiwon ordered iced latte and macaron. He express his views on the desserts he had ordered with viewers.; Due to Jiwon boring live streaming, the members were drowsy and the cameraman in the bus almost dose off while filming.; After live streaming, the members returned to their lodging and played in the creek.; In the evening, they played "Music Scholarship Quiz". Each members start with 200 points.; First-place winner of the quiz gets unlimited supply of black pork belly meal for dinner. The show will also donate ₩1,000,000 as a scholarship to their elementary school under the winner's name.; Second place gets a strip of black pork belly with rice and kimchi.; Third place gets a bowl of rice and kimchi.; Fourth place gets a bowl of rice and kimchi, but he has to make his own kimchi.; Fifth place gets a bottle of water.; The last place will get a penalty flick on his forehead from each of the member.
23 October 2020	3	Winners of "Music Scholarship Quiz" are Mino (first, 210 points), Soogeun (second, 170 points), P.O and Hodong (joint third, 150 points), Kyuhyun (fifth, 110 points) and Jiwon (last, zero points).; After their dinner, Na PD started the morning mission.; Morning Mission; The theme of the morning mission is "What are You Doing Now". Each member will pick a card that will indicate their task to perform till 9 am the next day.; If the member is able to perform the task as stated in the card, the first three members will have a breakfast from the food truck.
23 October 2020	3	Day 3: Morning Mission (continue); None of the members complete their morning mission.; After moving to another filming location, the members were split in two teams, playing a game of Yut with Korean language.; Team Nolbu (P.O, Soogeun and Hodong) and Team Nolbu's Wife (Kyuhyun, Jiwon and Mino).; Team Nolbu win the game and they receive a sumptuous dinner while Team Nolbu's Wife gets to eat puffed rice and crackers.
30 October 2020	4	After the dinner, they played the "Guess Who Quiz".; For every wrong answer, the production team will remove a Jirisan specialty product from the list of ten items from the table.; They did not win any specialty products.; Na PD suggested they form Team Old Boys (Hodong, Soogeun and Jiwon) and Team Young Boys (Kyuhyun, Mino and P.O) and play "Bonus Round over Pears".; Team Young Boys eventually win the quiz and a box of apples.; Na PD started the Nana Late Night Snack Bar.; This is an individual game challenge. If they are able to answer the questions, they will be rewarded with the choice of food. If failed, they will be penalised.; Morning Mission; The theme of the morning mission is "Keep Your Item". They will have to hide and preserve the item they received till the 9am next day.; The first three winners will get a hearty breakfast with a beautiful view.
30 October 2020	4	Day 4: Morning Mission (continue); Mino and P.O completed their morning mission.; Release of Dragon Balls; Each member will wish the gift (cost of each gift is limited to ₩1,000,000) they will receive if they win all the seven dragon balls from the Dragon Deity.; They failed the first mission. They negotiate with Na PD for a second chance but they still failed.; This conclude the filming in Jirisan.
6 November 2020	5	Retreat for Team Building; Day 1 (CJ ENM office and Yeongwol): Mino and P.O were tasked to design on a t-shirt and hoody jacket for each member and was present on their team building at the studio.; Na PD announced the new theme is Retreat for Team Building as a company.; Na PD presented six makeup designs for the members to decide and played Boom Boom game to select. They end up with the panda makeup.; Lunch choice; Prior to lunch, Jiwon was asked to make a voiceover of the Swallow (his character in this season) in the car.; The remaining were given a task to guess Jiwon's choice of first dish from a selection of 12.; If they are successful, they will earn one Dragon Ball but they failed.; Korean Language Game; Na PD joined the members in the car to play "Korean Language Game", but they failed. They have to do a live streaming.; They were given a re-match but they failed again.; At the restaurant, they played "Strawberry Game" to get lunch.; After arriving at Yeongwol, they start the team building game.; Team Mino (Soogeun, Kyuhyun and Mino) vs Team Ji Won (Hodong, Jiwon and P.O); Team Ji Won lose the game and was penalised.
13 November 2020	6	In the evening, the members gathered to do a confession/reflection of oneself.; After their confession, their phrase will be used in the "Music Scholarship Quiz". Each members start with 200 points.; First-place winner of the quiz will get a gift certificate of ₩1,000,000.; Second place gets a gift certificate of ₩300,000.; Third place gets a gift certificate of ₩150,000.; Fourth place gets a gift certificate of ₩50,000.; Fifth place gets a gift certificate of ₩10,000.; The last place will get a penalty flick on his forehead from each of the member.; Winners of "Music Scholarship Quiz" are Soogeun (first, 260 points), P.O (second, 130 points), Kyuhyun (third, minus 10 points), Jiwon (fourth, minus 60 points), Mino (fifth, minus 80 points) and Hodong (last, minus 110 points).; Na PD started the Nana's Tent Bar.; This is an individual game challenge. If they are able to answer the questions, they will be rewarded with a glass of drink of their choice and an accompaniment. If failed, they will be penalised.; Mino was able to answer one of questions and won the ownership of the Tent Bar.
13 November 2020	6	Day 2: Na PD get to know about Kyuhyun and Jiwon had a debate on who should wash the dishes if the host cooked a meal and used this debate to divide the members into two teams.; Hodong, Kyuhyun and P.O (Team Kyuhyun) vs Soogeun, Jiwon and Mino (Team Jiwon).; The losers will follow the winner's opinion.; They will play "Flipping of the Boards" game to determine the winners. The winners will get a sumptuous breakfast. Team Kyuhyun won the game.; The Medicinal Food Giveaway; The members will play "Guess Who Quiz" to win the medicinal products.; They were divided into Team Old Boys (Hodong, Soogeun and Jiwon) and Team Young Boys (Kyuhyun, Mino and P.O). Winners of each round will get a medicinal product.
20 November 2020	7	Name Them in a Row Game; They have Tteokbokki for lunch. But for every wrong answer, Cheongyang chilli, Vietnamese chilli or capsaicin sauce will be added to the broth of the Tteokbokki and one of the toppings removed.; The broth end up with 2 scoops of Cheongyang chilli, one scoop of Vietnamese chilli and capsicum sauce each with 4 toppings.; Release of Dragon Balls; Jiwon and Mino are selected to play "Table Tennis Rally" for 90 seconds. If they win the rally, they will win 2 Dragon Balls, but they failed.; This conclude the filming in Yeongwol.
20 November 2020	7	Dragon King and his friends Day 1 (Jeju island and Chujado): The members meet up again in Jeju Island and with the theme Dragon King and his friends.; The characters are Dragon King, terrapin, rock sea bream, red sea bream, black sea bream and Hijiki.; The member who is voted to be the Dragon King will appoint the remaining characters and make a valid request to the production per day. Jiwon won the election and become the first Dragon King.; After the makeup, the members go to Chujado to continue with the filming.; At Chujado, they started the Nana Tour with Supercheap Speed Package. They will visit six places and be the reporter to introduce the place to the viewers.; As the member alight the bus to introduce the place with some of the production staff, the bus will depart to the other locations.; After reporting at their locations, the members take selfies and production staff will decide who to be pick-up via "Contact-Free Common Knowledge Quiz" using group chat.; Only the first-place winner per question can get off work, the remaining members will report for ten minutes while they wait for the questions.; After a long day, all the members managed to gather at the base camp.
27 November 2020	8	For dinner, Jiwon and Mino were selected to be leaders.; The first game is to push food cans farthest on the two tables and team with the most food cans wins. Team members can only communicate in Korean language, any violations will have the team's food cans send to the starting line and remove one food can from the selection.; Soogeun, Jiwon and P.O (Team Jiwon) vs Hodong, Kyuhyun and Mino (Team Mino). After a long fight, Team Mino won the game.; Second game is "3 vs 3 Korean Language Table Tennis Relay". Each team has to score 15 points to win the game and any member using English will have their score reset to zero. In the end, Team Mino won again.; Team Mino gets to eat dinner of local delicacy.; After dinner, the members thought there was no morning mission and prepared to retire for the day. Unknowingly, the morning mission is "What Are Your Doing This Early in the Morning".; Any members who exit from their accommodation are asked to pick a numbered ping pong ball and was not given any reasons.; The members pranked each other with fake missions before sleeping.
27 November 2020	8	Day 2: Morning Mission; At 8 in the morning, Na PD send a message to each member informing their individual morning mission and will only proceed for 10 minutes.; Kyuhyun is to put on the Hijiki costume.; P.O is to wash Jiwon's face.; Mino is to stay on a plank position for two minutes.; Hodong is to make someone says he is sexy.; Soogeun is to make everyone fold their blankets.; P.O is to make a way to the bathroom.; Jiwon claimed that he did not receive any message on his mission as his privacy settings is only to receive message from his friends.; Kyuhyun and Mino succeeded in their missions and get to eat breakfast. The losers ate corn ice-creams.; After their breakfast, they visited Mojini Beach (pebble beach) in Chujado.; "New Journey to the West Circus Troupe". A '1 vs 5' talent competition.; Mino's talent is barefoot chicken fight. He won the fight and got five boxes of corvina.; Hodong's talent is arm wrestling. He won the fight and got five boxes of tile fish. The members also won a dragon ball after Hodong defeated one of the production staff in arm wrestling.; Kyuhyun's talent is eyes staring competition. He won the relay in 2 minutes and 4 seconds, and won gift vouchers.; After the competition, they go to Hupo Beach to watch the jumping fishes.
4 December 2020	9	They played the "Catch Mr. Mouse Game". Winners of each round will wear a cone hat in front of their face to eat the lunch for 30 seconds. They have a hard time eating as the cone hat restrict/limit their view of the table.; After lunch, they return to the lodging. Kyuhyun, Mino and P.O decided to go for a walk to the lighthouse observatory for a view of the ocean.; For dinner, they played "Doubles Team Match over Ramyeon"; Winning team can take anything them want for dinner; second place team can take one set of ramyeon, one of the toppings and one of the ingredients; losing team gets a packet of uncooked ramyeon.; Hodong and Soogeun (timeless duo); Mino and P.O (life-long friends); Jiwon and Kyuhyun (most incompatible duo). They played upgraded version "Shout in Silence" game, "Snitch Game".; Hodong and Soogeun got first place, Mino and P.O got second place while Jiwon and Kyuhyun got third place.; After Hodong and Soogeun completed selecting their ingreidents, Jiwon decided to use his Dragon King's valid request to reset/rematch the game which the production and members obligated to follow.; Na PD decide to simplify the rematch to the original "Shout in Silence".; Jiwon and Kyuhyun got first place, Hodong and Soogeun got second place while Mino and P.O got third place.; Morning mission; The members played a simple game to decide the order to receive the morning mission.; The mission is "Keep Your Item" and each are given ten seconds to hide the item that they selected. Other members cannot be around during the ten seconds.; Soogeun's item is salt; Mino's item is octopus; Kyuhyun's item is frozen Chaw bar; Hodong's item is to keep a piece of laver in his mouth; P.O's item is a cup of iced fish sauce mixed with coffee and Jiwon's is a big can of tuna.; Day 3: Morning mission; Soogeun, Hodong and Jiwon succeeded in their missions and get to eat breakfast.
11 December 2020	10	The members are now back at Jeju island to continue with their journey.; At the lodging, they played "Complete Four Characters Quiz" to acquire dishes for their lunch.; Na PD challenge Mino with "Grab the Tissue". If he succeed with the challenge, they will get a dragon ball. If Mino fails an attempt, the challenge will repeat at 6pm and again at 12am. Mino succeed and receive a dragon ball.; Before dinner, they played a '2 vs 2 vs 2' game with "Return of Zombies".; Hodong and Soogeun (Team Round Sun); Jiwon and Kyuhyun (Team Best Buddies); Mino and P.O (Team Hanlim Arts Schoolers).; First-place winners will get VIP set; second place gets solid meal set; third place gets vegan set.; First place — (Team Best Buddies); second place — (Team Hanlim Arts Schoolers); third place — (Team Round Sun).; Release of Dragon Balls; P.O was challenged with the "Rubber band challenge". If he succeed, they will earn a dragon, but he failed.; Na PD decided to play a bonus game, catch a card with his forehead. If each team is able to win the bonus, their meal set will be upgraded.; Director's cut was aired.
18 December 2020	11	Director's cut.

== Reception ==
In a survey done prior to the program's airing, 62.5% of the recipients knew about the new program, while 76.9% indicated that they would watch the program. The first trailer of the show which was revealed on 25 August 2015 via Naver TVCast exceeded more than 1 million view in less than 24 hours and became a hot topic among netizen.

The first five episodes, each spanning between five and ten minutes, were uploaded at 10 a.m. Five hours after it release, more than 50,000 people had subscribed to the channel on Naver's video streaming website TVCast, where the show is broadcast. The first episode has been viewed more than 700,000 times, with the five together recording a combined 2 million views. After 12 hours of its release, the five episodes almost hit 5 million views.

It has received positive response from the public. The show's network tvN revealed that the first five episodes, released through Naver TV Cast recorded 6.1 million hits on the first day of its release. If the trailer and the video unveiled in production presentation are also included, the number adds up to 11.5 million views as of the morning of 5 September 2015. In 3 days after its release, the first five episodes hit 8.7 million views and reach 14.4 million views altogether (including views for press conference and trailer clips).

On 8 September 2015, 'New Journey the West' Season 1 has accumulated 15 million views on Naver TV Cast since its release. In the day of the second five episodes release, 11 September, the show already attracted more than 20 million combined views online with its trailer and first episode. It made "New Journey to the West" as the first online broadcast to reach the break-even point with only advertising revenues in South Korea. Executive of CJ E&M stated, "We are likely to reap the profits earlier-than-expected thanks to a surge in viewers. Online broadcast is emerging as a new cash cow with TV ad revenues declining."

It also received good responses in China. On 5 September 2015, 'New Journey to the West' first on QQ video real time chart, and fourth in overall QQ videos site. On 7 September, the first 5 episodes of this show already got more than 10 million views on QQ Video in China. The Second 5 episodes (episode 6–10) which released in following week, got 10 million just 2 days after its release.

== Ratings ==
- In the ratings below, the highest rating for the show will be in red and the lowest rating for the show will be in blue.
- Note that the show airs on a cable channel (pay TV), which plays part in its slower uptake and relatively small audience share when compared to programs broadcast (FTA) on public networks such as KBS, SBS, MBC or EBS.
List of ratings (season 1)

Season 1
Episode #	Broadcast Date	AGB Ratings (Nationwide)
1	8 April 2016	2.702%
2	15 April 2016	2.721%

List of ratings (season 2)

Season 2
Episode #	Broadcast Date	AGB Ratings (Nationwide)
1	22 April 2016	2.722%
2	29 April 2016	2.688%
3	6 May 2016	2.746%
4	13 May 2016	5.012%
5	20 May 2016	3.622%
6	27 May 2016	3.480%
7	3 June 2016	2.862%
8	10 June 2016	3.660%
9	17 June 2016	3.830%

List of ratings (season 3)

Season 3
Episode #	Broadcast Date	AGB Ratings (Nationwide)
1	8 January 2017	3.618%
2	15 January 2017	3.538%
3	22 January 2017	3.619%
4	29 January 2017	3.071%
5	5 February 2017	3.529%
6	12 February 2017	3.132%
7	19 February 2017	3.540%
8	26 February 2017	3.706%
9	5 March 2017	3.355%
10	12 March 2017	2.839%

List of ratings (season 4)

Season 4
Episode #	Broadcast Date	AGB Ratings (Nationwide)
1	13 June 2017	3.299%
2	20 June 2017	2.766%
3	27 June 2017	3.534%
4	4 July 2017	3.762%
5	11 July 2017	3.244%
6	18 July 2017	4.329%
7	25 July 2017	3.474%
8	1 August 2017	4.423%
9	8 August 2017	4.624%
10	15 August 2017	5.119%
11	22 August 2017	3.921%

List of ratings (season 5 & 6)

Season 5 & 6
Season	Episode #	Broadcast Date	AGB Ratings (Nationwide)
5	1	30 September 2018	5.727%
5	2	7 October 2018	4.772%
5	3	14 October 2018	5.295%
5	4	21 October 2018	4.639%
5	5	28 October 2018	4.762%
6	5	28 October 2018	4.762%
6	6	4 November 2018	5.629%
6	7	11 November 2018	6.295%
6	8	18 November 2018	6.612%
6	9	25 November 2018	6.822%
6	10	2 December 2018	5.410%

New Journey to the West : South Korea viewers per episode (millions)

Season	Episode number										Average
Season	1	2	3	4	5	6	7	8	9	10	Average
5 & 6	1.675	1.442	1.538	1.409	1.519	1.755	1.993	1.939	2.137	1.779	1.719

Source: Audience measurement performed nationwide by Nielsen Media Research. (Note: The number of viewers was released on Nielsen starting January 2018.)

List of ratings (season 7)

Season 7
Episode #	Broadcast Date	AGB Ratings (Nationwide)
1	25 October 2019	5.660%
2	1 November 2019	6.637%
3	8 November 2019	6.041%
4	15 November 2019	6.425%
5	22 November 2019	5.515%
6	29 November 2019	6.419%
7	6 December 2019	6.072%
8	13 December 2019	6.387%
9	20 December 2019	5.457%
10	27 December 2019	5.884%
11	3 January 2020	5.842%

New Journey to the West : South Korea viewers per episode (millions)

Season	Episode number											Average
Season	1	2	3	4	5	6	7	8	9	10	11	Average
7	1.697	1.911	1.755	1.803	1.585	1.809	1.681	1.803	1.562	1.604	1.597	1.710

Source: Audience measurement performed nationwide by Nielsen Media Research.

List of ratings (season 8)

Season 8
Episode #	Broadcast Date	AGB Ratings (Nationwide)
1	9 October 2020	5.270%
2	16 October 2020	5.007%
3	23 October 2020	4.270%
4	30 October 2020	5.429%
5	6 November 2020	5.146%
6	13 November 2020	5.519%
7	20 November 2020	5.065%
8	27 November 2020	5.891%
9	4 December 2020	6.442%
10	11 December 2020	6.721%
11	18 December 2020	5.972%

New Journey to the West : South Korea viewers per episode (millions)

Season	Episode number											Average
Season	1	2	3	4	5	6	7	8	9	10	11	Average
8	1.778	1.630	1.352	1.653	1.602	1.723	1.617	1.847	2.090	2.028	1.877	1.745

Source: Audience measurement performed nationwide by Nielsen Media Research.

== Awards and nominations ==
Year	Award	Category	Recipient	Result	Ref.
2016	tvN10 Awards	Best Content Award, Variety	New Journey to the West	Won	
2016	tvN10 Awards	Variety Icon	Kang Ho-dong; Lee Soo-geun; Eun Ji-won; Ahn Jae-hyun	Nominated	

== Spin-offs ==
Year	Title	Cast	Network
2017	Youth Over Flowers: Winner	Kim Jin-woo, Lee Seung-hoon, Mino, Kang Seung-yoon	tvN
2017–2019	Kang's Kitchen	Kang Ho-dong, Lee Soo-geun, Eun Ji-won, Ahn Jae-hyun, Cho Kyu-hyun, Mino, P.O	tvN
2019	Three Meals in Iceland	Lee Soo-geun, Eun Ji-won	tvN
2019–2020	The Ramyeonator	Kang Ho-dong	tvN
2020	Mapo Hipster	Mino, P.O	tvN
2020	Three Meals for Four	Eun Ji-won, Lee Jai-jin, Kim Jae-duck, Jang Su-won	tvN
2020	Lee's Kitchen	Lee Soo-geun	tvN
2020–2021	Things That Make Me Groove	Cho Kyu-hyun	tvN
2021	Don't Look Back	You Hee-yeol, Eun Ji-won, Lee Jai-jin, Kim Jae-duck, Jang Su-won	tvN
2021	Spring Camp	Kang Ho-dong, Lee Soo-geun, Eun Ji-won, Ahn Jae-hyun, Cho Kyu-hyun, Mino, P.O	TVING
2021	The Game Caterers	Na Young-seok	tvN
2021	Mino's Pilot	Mino	tvN
2021	The Sports Master Ahn Jae-hyun	Ahn Jae-hyun	tvN
2025	Three Idiots in Kenya	Lee Soo-geun, Eun Ji-won, Cho Kyu-hyun	Netflix
