= Kang's Kitchen =

- Promotional poster
- Also known as: New Journey to the West spin-off
- Genre: Variety show
- Written by: Lee Woo-jung; Choi Jae-young
- Directed by: Na Young-seok; Shin Hyo-jung
- Starring: Kang Ho-dong; Eun Ji-won; Lee Soo-geun; Ahn Jae-hyun; Cho Kyu-hyun; Song Min-ho; P.O; Cho Kyuhyun
- Country of origin: South Korea
- Original language: Korean
- No. of seasons: 3
- No. of episodes: 16

Production
- Production locations: ' Jeju Island; Gyeongju
- Camera setup: Multi-camera setup
- Running time: 70-90 minutes

Original release
- Network: tvN
- Release: December 5, 2017 – August 2, 2019

Related
- New Journey to the West; Youn's Kitchen

Kang's Kitchen (Korean: 신서유기 외전 강식당) is a South Korean travel-reality show. It is a spin-off of the variety show New Journey to the West. The show airs every Fridays at 9.10 pm(Korea) on cable channel tvN starting from December 5, 2017.

The show was a success, recording an average rating of 8.3 percent, with its peak at 9.1 percent.

On 12 December 2018's episode of New Journey to the West, it was revealed by producer Na Young-seok that season 2 of the show is in the works, with P.O joining the cast. The second and third season aired in the summer of 2019.

== Synopsis ==
Members of New Journey to the West season four runs a restaurant on Jeju Island.

During the Season 4 of New Journey to the West, members had the opportunity to shoot their version of Youn's Kitchen in exchange for their prizes - a Lamborghini and a Porsche. The cars were an inside joke among the producers & scriptwriters, as they didn't think the members will be able to win, which ultimately backfired.

Kang Ho-dong, a rookie chef who is challenging cooking for the first time in his life, and members of staff at a restaurant will be responsible for preparing ingredients, ordering food, and entertaining guests. Kang's Kitchen is held in Hallym, Jeju Island, and pork cutlet is served to the guests of 10 teams selected through lottery.

== Airtime ==
Season	Airdate	Broadcast Time (KST)
1	5 December 2017 – 9 January 2018	Tuesdays 10.50 p.m.
2	31 May – 5 July 2019	Fridays 9.10 p.m.
3	12 July – 2 August 2019	Fridays 9.10 p.m.

== Cast ==
=== Main cast ===
- Kang Ho-dong : Head chef
- Eun Ji-won : Hall manager
- Lee Soo-geun : Part-timer
- Ahn Jae-hyun : Sous chef
- Song Min-ho : Part-timer
- P.O : Sous Chef
- Cho Kyu-hyun : Head Chef

=== Guest ===
- Baek Jong-won
- Na Young-seok : Na Slave

== Menu ==
=== Season 1 ===
Main Dish

- Tonkatsu
  - Kang Ho-dong (XXL)
  - Lee Soo-geun (Small)
- Omurice
- Ramyeon
- Samgyeopsal Kimbap

=== Season 2 ===
Main Dish

- Garak-guksu
  - Hot
  - Cold
  - Bibim
- Tteok-bokki
  - Medium
  - Large
- Jajang-Tteok-bokki
- Kimchi fried rice
- Jajang-Omurice

Dessert

- Patbingsu
- Mango Parfait
- Ice cream

=== Season 3 ===
Main Dish

- Pizza
  - Kang Ho-dong (60 cm)
  - Lee Soo-geun (20 cm)
- Bulgogi Pasta
- Cream Pasta
- Kimchi fried rice
- Jajang-Omurice

Dessert

- Patbingsu
- Ice Cream
- Parfait
  - Mango
  - Strawberry

== Ratings ==
- In the table below, the blue numbers represent the lowest ratings and the red numbers represent the highest ratings.
Season One

Ep.	Date	Average audience share		
Ep.	Date	AGB Nielsen		TNmS
Ep.	Date	Nationwide	Seoul	Nationwide
1	December 5, 2017	5.448%	6.173%	6.6%
2	December 12, 2017	5.313%	6.072%	6.2%
3	December 19, 2017	6.900%	7.721%	6.5%
4	December 26, 2017	8.245%	9.412%	8.0%
5	January 2, 2018	8.313%	9.278%	9.1%
6	January 9, 2018	5.880%	6.742%	7.1%
Average		6.683%	7.566%	7.25%

Season Two

Ep.	Date	Average audience share	
Ep.	Date	AGB Nielsen	
Ep.	Date	Nationwide	Seoul
1	May 31, 2019	7.749%	7.895%
2	June 7, 2019	6.537%	7.127%
3	June 14, 2019	6.081%	6.698%
4	June 21, 2019	6.192%	7.008%
5	June 28, 2019	6.977%	7.306%
6	July 5, 2019	7.172%	7.789%
Average		6.785%	7.304%

Season Three

Ep.	Date	Average audience share	
Ep.	Date	AGB Nielsen	
Ep.	Date	Nationwide	Seoul
1	July 12, 2019	7.470%	8.133%
2	July 19, 2019	6.151%	6.589%
3	July 26, 2019	5.562%	5.372%
4	August 2, 2019	5.880%	6.123%
Average		6.266%	6.554%

- This drama aired on a cable channel/pay TV which normally has a relatively smaller audience compared to free-to-air TV/public broadcasters (KBS, SBS, MBC & EBS).
