= Lee Soo-geun =

South Korean comedian (born 1975)

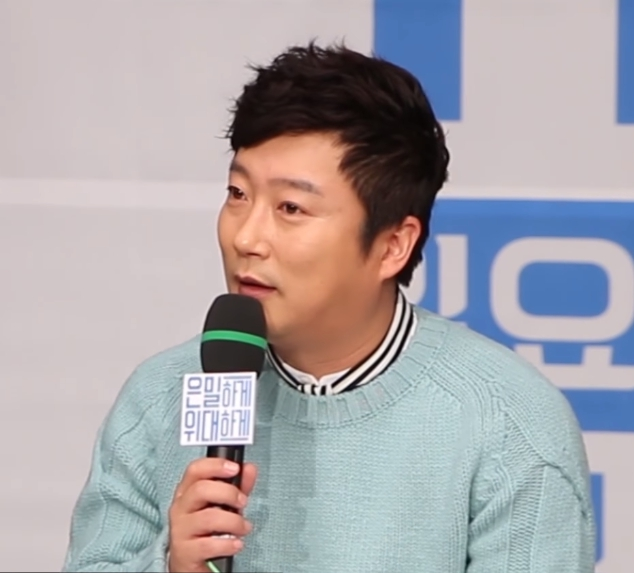
- Lee in 2017
- Born: Lee Soo-geun; February 10, 1975 (age 51); Yangpyeong County, Gyeonggi Province, South Korea
- Notable work: 2 Days & 1 Night; Gag Concert; Knowing Bros; New Journey to the West; Kang's Kitchen; Player 7
- Spouse: Park Ji-yeon (m. 2008)
- Children: 2

Comedy career
- Years active: 1996–2013; 2015–Present
- Medium: Stand-up comedy, television, master of ceremonies
- Genre: Comedy

Korean name
- Hangul: 이수근
- Hanja: 李壽根
- RR: I Sugeun
- MR: I Sugŭn

Lee Soo-geun (Korean: 이수근; born February 10, 1975) is a South Korean comedian who has worked on a number of comedy shows on South Korean television. He began his career as a comedian on KBS Gag Concert.

== Career ==
Before entering the entertainment industry, Lee worked as a recreational instructor, and entered a singing contest on MBC's River Music Festival (강변가요제). He was also an aerobics instructor. In October 2006, he began his own online internet shopping mall, selling clothes. In May 2008, he became an ambassador for the Pork Management Committee (양돈 자조금 관리위원회 홍보대사)

Lee has appeared on many reality-variety shows. He made a breakthrough in his career after appearing on KBS' Happy Sunday: 1 Night 2 Days. He was seen as the most hardworking member of the cast and was in charge of driving in the show, as he had a commercial coach license. After appearing on the show, he earned more recognition and was offered MC roles on other shows, such as season 2 of Sang Sang Plus, his first TV appearance in the role of an MC. His marriage was broadcast on national television on 1 Night 2 Days.

Up until 2012, he was signed under Castle J Entertainment, and on September 19, it was announced that he had signed exclusive contracts with SM C&C, a subsidiary of SM Entertainment, along with Kim Byung-man, immediately after fellow national MC Kang Ho-dong and Shin Dong-yup joined.

In December 2015, he reunited with Kang Ho-dong as a cast member for JTBC's new variety show, Knowing Bros.

In 2017, Lee Soo-geun appeared in more than ten programs.

In 2024, he left SM C&C and joined BPM Entertainment.

== Personal life ==
Lee married Park Ji-yeon in 2008. They have 2 sons from their marriage, Lee Tae-joon and Lee Tae-seo. Lee's mother is a shaman.

He is a Taekwondo black belt (he is currently a 5th dan black belt in Taekwondo and has demonstrated his skills on various variety shows such as Guesthouse Daughters and Knowing Bros).

== Controversies ==
In 2013, Lee was under the investigation for suspicion of online illegal gambling along with Tony An, Tak Jae-hoon, Andy Lee & Boom. Lee was involved in an illegal sports gambling scandal, in which he placed bets on the results of top division football teams in the United Kingdom by using an illegal online gambling website and cell phone text messages. Lee has claimed to have bet billions of Korean won on online sports betting websites. As a result of researching his gambling activities, Lee Soo-geun was found to have gambled using US$370,000 from December 2008 to June 2011. In the first public trial on the morning of December 6, 2013, Judge Shin Myung-hee of the Seoul Central Prosecutor's Office charged Lee Soo Geun with eight months in prison and two years of probation. Lee Soo Geun, who appeared in the first public trial with his lawyer, repeatedly acknowledged his crime and begged for mercy. After two years of self-restraint time at home, he returned with billiards competition show "Juk-bang Legend". Before filming the first episode of the show, Lee said "I will restart as if it is my first time."

== Discography ==
- 2020: "SWAG" (ft. Chin Chilla and Jiselle) - Show Me The Play 2 Final
- 2019: "White Winter" (with. Kim Hee-chul) - STATION X 4 LOVEs for Winter Part.3
- 2010: "Huk" (ft. Eun Jiwon)
- 2009: "Happy Song" (ft. Ez-Life)
- 2009: "Let's Keep Going Until the End" (ft. Eun Jiwon)

== Filmography ==
Year	Title
2015–present	Knowing Bros
2018–present	Lee Soo Geun's Channel
2019–present	Ask Us Anything Fortune Teller
2021–present	The Girls Who Hit Goals
2021–present	My Neighborhood Class
2022	Daughter Thieves
2022–present	Fantastic Family
2022	Trust Me and Follow Me, Urban Fishermen 4
2022	Extreme Beginner
2022	Hanbly
2023	City Sashimi Restaurant

== Accolades ==
=== Awards ===
Year	Award Show	Award
2006	KBS Entertainment Awards	Excellent Corner Award for Comedy Division
2007	KBS Entertainment Awards	Best Entertainer's Award (Men Division)
2008	KBS Entertainment Awards	New Male MC Award (Variety Show Division)
2008	15th Korea Entertainment Awards	Comedian Award
2009	KBS Entertainment Awards	Male MC Award (Variety Show Division)
2010	Mnet 20's Choice Awards	Mnet 20's Choice 20th Most influential star
2010	The 11th Korea Visual Arts Competition	Portfolio Award
2010	KBS Entertainment Awards	Excellence Award (Variety Show Division)
2011	Baeksang Arts Awards	Best Male Variety Performer
2011	23rd Korea PD Awards	Comedian Award
2011	The 38th Korea Broadcasting Awards	Personal Comedy Division
2011	KBS Entertainment Awards	Top Excellence Award
2011	KBS Entertainment Awards	Entertainment Daesang - 1N2D team members
2012	3rd Korea Popular Culture and Arts Awards	Minister of Culture, Sports and Tourism citation
2016	The 10th Cable TV Broadcasting	Popular Star - as MC of Juk-bang Legend (죽방전설)
2019	Brand of the Year Awards	Male Variety Star
2021	SBS Entertainment Awards	Best Couple Award with Bae Sung-jae – Kick A Goal

=== Listicles ===
Name of publisher, year listed, name of listicle, and placement
Publisher	Year	Listicle	Placement	Ref.
Forbes	2010	Korea Power Celebrity	39th	
Forbes	2020	Korea Power Celebrity	8th	

Awards and achievements
Preceded by Shin Bong-sun	KBS Entertainment Awards for Best Male MC; 2009; 2010	Succeeded by -
Preceded by Han Seok-joon	KBS Entertainment Awards for Best Newcomer MC; 2008	Succeeded by Jun Hyun-moo
Preceded by Kim Jong-min	KBS Entertainment Awards for Best Entertainer; 2007	Succeeded by Kim Sung-min; Kim Tae-won; Lee Ha-neul
