= 2021 KBS Entertainment Awards =

19th edition of award ceremony

- Official logo
- Awarded for: Excellence in variety entertainment
- Date: December 25, 2021
- Venue: KBS New Wing Open Hall, Yeouido-dong, Yeongdeungpo-gu, Seoul
- Country: South Korea
- Presented by: Korean Broadcasting System
- Hosted by: Kim Sung-joo; Moon Se-yoon; Han Sun-hwa

Highlights
- Daesang (Grand Prize): Moon Se-yoon - 2 Days & 1 Night 4, Godfather, Trot Magic Circus
- Viewers’ Choice for Best Program: 2 Days & 1 Night 4
- Entertainer of the Year: Kim Sook; Jun Hyun-moo; Kim Jong-min; Moon Se-yoon; Park Joo-ho and his family (Na Eun, Gun Hoo, Jin Woo)
- Website: KBS Entertainment Awards

Television/radio coverage
- Network: KBS2, KBS World
- Runtime: Approx. 240 minutes
- Viewership: Ratings: 7.3%; Viewership: 1.41 million viewers
- Produced by: Lee Hwang-seon
- Directed by: Jo Sung-suk; Son Ja-yeon; Kim Hyung-seok

The 2021 KBS Entertainment Awards presented by Korean Broadcasting System (KBS), took place on December 25, 2021, at KBS New Wing Open Hall in Yeouido-dong, Yeongdeungpo-gu, Seoul. It was hosted by Kim Sung-joo, Moon Se-yoon and Han Sun-hwa. Daesang (Grand Prize) was awarded to Moon Se-yoon for 2 Days & 1 Night 4, Godfather, Trot Magic Circus.

== Nominations and winners ==
(Winners denoted in bold)

Grand Prize (Daesang)	Viewers' Choice Best Program Award
**Moon Se-yoon – 2 Days & 1 Night 4, Godfather, Trot Magic Circus**; Kim Jong-min; Kim Sook; Jeon Hyun-moo; Park Joo-ho's family	**2 Days & 1 Night 4**; Dogs Are Incredible; Immortal Songs: Singing the Legend; Boss in the Mirror; Mr. House Husband 2; The Return of Superman
Top Excellence Award
Show/Variety Category	Reality Category
**Jang Yoon-jeong – I Like to Sing, LAN Marketplace, The Return of Superman**; Dindin – 2 Days & 1 Night 4; Jang Do-yeon – Dogs Are Incredible; Lee Hwi-jae – Entertainment Weekly (Live); Song Ga-in – Trot Magic Circus	**Hur Jae – Godfather, Boss in the Mirror**; Lee Young-ja – Stars' Top Recipe at Fun-Staurant; Ryu Soo-young – Stars' Top Recipe at Fun-Staurant; Sayuri Fujita – The Return of Superman
Excellence Award
Show/Variety Category	Reality Category
**Yeon Jung-hoon – 2 Days & 1 Night 4**; **Lee Seung-yoon – Gag Fighters**	**Jang Minho – Godfather**; **Oh Yoon-ah – Stars' Top Recipe at Fun-Staurant**; Ki Tae-young – Stars' Top Recipe at Fun-Staurant; So Yoo-jin – The Return of Superman; Solar – Boss in the Mirror, The Song We Loved, New Singer; Choi Soo-jong & Ha Hee-ra – Mr. House Husband 2
Entertainer of the Year
**Kim Sook – Boss in the Mirror**; **Jun Hyun-moo – Boss in the Mirror**; **Kim Jong-min – 2 Days & 1 Night 4**; **Moon Se-yoon – 2 Days & 1 Night 4**; **Park Joo-ho and his family (Na Eun, Gun Hoo, Jin Woo) – The Return of Superman**
Best Entertainer Award
Show/Variety Category	Reality Category
**Solar – Boss in the Mirror, The Song We Loved, New Singer**; **Jang Do-yeon – Dogs Are Incredible**; **Hong Hyun-hee – LAN Marketplace**	**Kim Byung-hyun – Boss in the Mirror**; **Sayuri Fujita – The Return of Superman**
Rookie Award
Show/Variety Category	Reality Category
**Ravi – 2 Days & 1 Night 4**; Park Jin-ho – Gag Fighters; Lee Young-ji – Come Back Home; Lee Chan-won – Immortal Songs: Singing the Legend; Wonyoung & Sunghoon – Music Bank	**Hong Sung-heon – Mr. House Husband 2**; Gong Hyo-jin – Today's Harmless; Kim Kap-soo – Godfather; Kim Byung-hyun – Boss in the Mirror; Yang Ji-eun – The Return of Superman
Radio DJ Award
New DJ of the Year Award	DJ of the Year Award
**Yoon Jung-soo, Nam Chang-hee (Mr. Radio)**	**Park Myung-soo – Park Myung-soo's Radio Show**
Other Awards
Staff of the Year Award	Producers' Special Award
**Kim Soo-ae - Editor-in- Chief**	**Kang Hyun-wook – Dogs Are Incredible**
Broadcasting Screenwriter Award
**Noh Jin-young - 2 Days & 1 Night 4**
Popularity Award	Best Challenge Award
**Ryu Soo-young – Stars' Top Recipe at Fun-Staurant**; **Song Ga-in – Trot Magic Circus**	**Gag Fighters**
Best Icon Award	Best Couple Award
**Children – The Return of Superman**	**Lee Hwi-jae, Lee Hyun-joo – Entertainment Weekly (Live)**; **Park Sung-hoon, Jang Won-young** – **Music Bank**
Best Online Content Award	Best Teamwork Award
**Tomorrow X Together**	**Mr. House Husband Season 2**
Achievement Award	Hot Issue TV Personality Award
**Choi Soo-jong & Ha Hee-ra – Mr. House Husband 2**	**Lee Yeon-bok - Stars' Top Recipe at Fun-Staurant**; **Jung Ho-young - Boss in the Mirror**

== Presenters ==
Order	Presenter(s)	Award(s)	Ref.
1	Park Myung-soo and Solar	Rookie Awards	
2	DinDin and Ravi	Writers' Award	
2	DinDin and Ravi	Staff of the Year Award	
3	Kim Jaewon and Kim Yi-joon	Best Icon Award	
4	Lee Geum-hee and Park Joon-hyung	Radio DJ Awards	
5	Hur Jae and Hong Sung-heon	Hot Issue TV Personality Award	
5	Hur Jae and Hong Sung-heon	Best Online Content Award	
5	Hur Jae and Hong Sung-heon	Best Challenge Award	
6	Kim Je-deok and Choi Yoo-jung (Weki Meki)	Popularity Award	
7	Jang Do-yeon and Hong Hyun-hee	Producers' Special Award	
8	Song Ga-in	Achievement Award	
9	–	Entertainer of the Year	
10	Gu Bon-gil and Oh Sang-uk	Best Teamwork Award	
10	Gu Bon-gil and Oh Sang-uk	Best Couple Award	
11	Gabee and Noze	Best Entertainer Awards	
12	Kim Jong-min and Kim Tae-jin	Excellence Awards	
13	Jun Hyun-moo and Cha Chung-hwa	Top Excellence Awards	
14	Choi Hyun-ah and Lee Hwi-jae	Viewers' Choice Best Program Award	
15	Kim Eui-chul and Park Jin-hee	Grand Prize (Daesang)	

== See also ==
- 2021 MBC Entertainment Awards
- 2021 SBS Entertainment Awards
