= 2019 KBS Entertainment Awards =

17th edition of award ceremony

- Awarded for: Excellence in variety entertainment
- Date: December 21, 2019
- Site: KBS New Wing Open Hall, Yeouido-dong, Yeongdeungpo-gu, Seoul
- Hosted by: Jun Hyun-moo; Kim Jun-hyun; Son Dam-bi; Jang Dong-yoon

Television coverage
- Network: KBS2, KBS World
- Duration: 210 minutes
- Viewership: Ratings: 7.6% (Part 1); 7.7% (Part 2); Viewership:1.44 million

The 2019 KBS Entertainment Awards presented by Korean Broadcasting System (KBS), took place on December 21, 2019 at KBS New Wing Open Hall in Yeouido-dong, Yeongdeungpo-gu, Seoul. The 1st part was hosted by Jun Hyun-moo, Son Dam-bi and Jang Dong-yoon. During the 2nd part of the show, Jun Hyun-moo was replaced by Kim Jun-hyun.

== Nominations and winners ==
(Winners denoted in bold)

Grand Prize (Daesang)		Viewers' Choice Best Program Award
**The Return of Superman Fathers** **(Sam Hammington, Park Joo-ho, Moon Hee-joon, Hong Kyung-min, Do Kyung-wan)**; Lee Young-ja; Kim Sook; Lee Kyung-kyu; Jun Hyun-moo		**The Return of Superman**; Gag Concert; Immortal Songs: Singing the Legend; Boss in the Mirror; Mr. House Husband 2; Stars' Top Recipe at Fun-Staurant
Top Excellence Award
Entertainment Category		Comedy Category
**Kim Seung-hyun – Mr. House Husband 2**; Sam Hammington – The Return of Superman; Park Joo-ho – The Return of Superman; Kim Jun-hyun – Battle Trip; Jo Se-ho – Happy Together Season 4; Hyun Joo-yup – Boss in the Mirror		**Park Joon-hyung – 2019 Everyday Dialect, Bababa Brothers**; Kim Dae-hee – It Could Happen, Lucky Day; Yoo Min-sang – King Of Characters, Hidden Voice; Gwon Jae-kwan – Pigeon Magic Troupe, All-knowing Watcher; Shin Bong-sun – My Boyfriend's Female Friend, Bongsiri; Song Jun-geun – Lucky Day, Follow the Song and Walk 3000 Meters
Excellence Award
Entertainment Category		Comedy Category
**Do Kyung-wan – The Return of Superman, I Like Songs**; **Kim Tae-woo – Immortal Songs: Singing the Legend**; Choi Yang-rak, Paeng Hyun-sook – Mr. Househusband 2; Choi Hyun-seok – Boss in the Mirror; Hong Kyung-min – The Return of Superman; Min Kyung-hoon – Problem Child in House		**Seo Tae-hoon – Trot Drama, Hidden Voice**; Yang Seon-il – My Pet, Weekly Park Sung-kwang; Song Young-gil – My Pet, Weekly Park Sung-kwang; Ahn So-mi – Trot Drama, King Of Characters; Lee Hyun-jung – Refreshing Statement, Weekly Park Sung-kwang
Rookie Award
Entertainment Category		Comedy Category
**Jung Il-woo**; **Sim Yeong-soon**; Bomi; Lee Yu-bi; Choi Bo-min; Shin Ye-eun		**Bae-jeong-geun**; Park Jin-ho; Jo Jin-se; Lee Ja-eun; Eom Ji-yoon
Other Awards
Staff of the Year Award	Best Idea Award	Best Teamwork Award
**Kim Seung-jun**	**Gag Concert: Weekly Park Sung-kwang**	**Happy Together**
Broadcasting Screenwriter Award		Best Icon Award
**Beak Sun-young – The Return of Superman, Stars' Top Recipe at Fun-Staurant**		**The Return of Superman Children**
New DJ of the Year Award	DJ of the Year Award	2019 Hot Issue Variety Program
**Jung Eun-ji – Jung Eun-ji Gayo Plaza**	**Lee Geum-hee – 사랑하기 좋은 날 이금희입니다**	**Stars' Top Recipe at Fun-Staurant**
2019 Hot Issue Entertainer Award		Achievement Award
**Baekho – Mansuro**; **Choi Min-hwan – Mr. House Husband 2**; **Yang Chi-seung – Boss in the Mirror**; **Jo Myeong-seop – Love Music**		**Shin Hyun-joon** **– Entertainment Company**
Producers' Special Award	Best Challenge Award	Best Couple Award
**Shin Dong-yup – Immortal Songs: Singing the Legend, Hello Counselor**	**Mansuro**; **Problem Child in House**	**Lee Kyung-kyu and Lee Young-ja – Stars' Top Recipe at Fun-Staurant**; **Shin Ye-eun and Choi Bo-min – Music Bank**; Lee Soo-geun and Seo Jang-hoon – Ask Us Anything Fortune Teller; Jang Yoon-jeong and Do Kyung-wan – The Return of Superman, I Like Songs; Kim Tae-woo and Moon Hee-joon – Immortal Songs: Singing the Legend

== Presenters ==
Order	Presenter	Award	Ref.
1	Yoo Jae-suk, Jung Il-woo	Rookie Award in Comedy Category; Rookie Award in Entertainment Category	
2	Kim Sook, Kim Kang-hoon	Best Icon Award	
3	Song Eun-i, Kang Hyung-wook	Broadcasting Screenwriter Award; Best Icon Award	
4	Shin Ye-eun, Choi Bo-min	New DJ of the Year Award; DJ of the Year Award	
5	Park Mak-rye, Moon Se-yoon	2019 Hot Issue Entertainer Award	
6	Kim Dae-hee, Shin Bong-sun	2019 Hot Issue Variety Program	
7	Hong Jin-young, Jo Se-ho	Producers' Special Award	
8	Ravi, DinDin, Kim Seon-ho	Best Challenge Award	
9	Choi Yang-rak, Paeng Hyun-sook	Best Couple Award	
10	Park Jong-hoon	Achievement Award	
11	Lee Kyung-kyu, Lee Yoo-bi	Best Teamwork Award	
12	Shin Dong-yup	Staff of the Year Award	
13	Jang Sung-kyu, Lee Hae-sung	Excellence Award in Comedy; Excellence Award in Entertainment	
14	Kim Su-ro, Lee Si-young	Top Excellence Award in Comedy	
15	Kim Jong-min, Yeon Jung-hoon	Top Excellence Award in Entertainment	
16	Lee Hoon-hee, Lee Young-ja	Viewers' Choice Best Program Award	
17	Yang Seung-dong, Kim So-yeon	Grand Prize (Daesang)	

== Special performances ==
Order	Artist	Song/Spectacle	Ref.
1	Hong Seok-kang ft. Jun Hyun-moo	Friend Like Me (Original: Jung Sung-hwa)	
2	Ahn So-mi	Wa (Original: Lee Jung-hyun)	
2	Park Joon-hyung, Kim Su-young	Choryeon (Original: Clon)	
2	Kim Seung-hyun, Hong Kyung-min	Shaky Friendship (Original: Hong Kyung-min)	
3	Kim Jun-hyun, Moon Se-yoon	Amateur (Original: Lee Seung-chul)	
4	Gag Concert (Lee Dong-yoon, Lee Kwang-seob, Kim Tae-won, Im Jae-beak, Bok Hyun-kyu, Eom Ji-yoon, Jeon Su-hee, Song Yi-ji, Lee Jeong-in)	Who Will Be Getting The Grand Award (Daesang)?	
