= 2024 KBS Entertainment Awards =

22nd edition of award ceremony

- Official poster
- Awarded for: Excellence in variety entertainment
- Date: December 21, 2024
- Venue: KBS New Wing Open Hall, Yeouido-dong, Yeongdeungpo District, Seoul
- Country: South Korea
- Presented by: Korean Broadcasting System
- Hosted by: Lee Joon; Lee Young-ji; Lee Chan-won

Highlights
- Grand Prize: Lee Chan-won
- Viewers' Choice Best Program Award: Immortal Songs: Singing the Legend
- Website: KBS Entertainment Awards

Television/radio coverage
- Network: KBS2, KBS World
- Viewership: Ratings: 4.6%; Viewership: 811,000
- Directed by: Lee Myung-seop; Choi Ji-na

The 2024 KBS Entertainment Awards presented by Korean Broadcasting System (KBS), took place on December 21, 2024, at KBS New Wing Open Hall in Yeouido-dong, Yeongdeungpo District, Seoul. It was hosted by Lee Joon, Lee Young-ji, and Lee Chan-won.

It was announced that singer Park Seo-jin, who is a strong contender for Rookie of the Year award will attend the award ceremony in spite of controversy of his military exemption.

In the ceremony broadcast live, Lee Chan-won, won the Grand Prize (Daesang) and Entertainer of the Year awards. Viewers' Choice Best Program Award was awarded to Immortal Songs: Singing the Legend.

== Nominations and winners ==
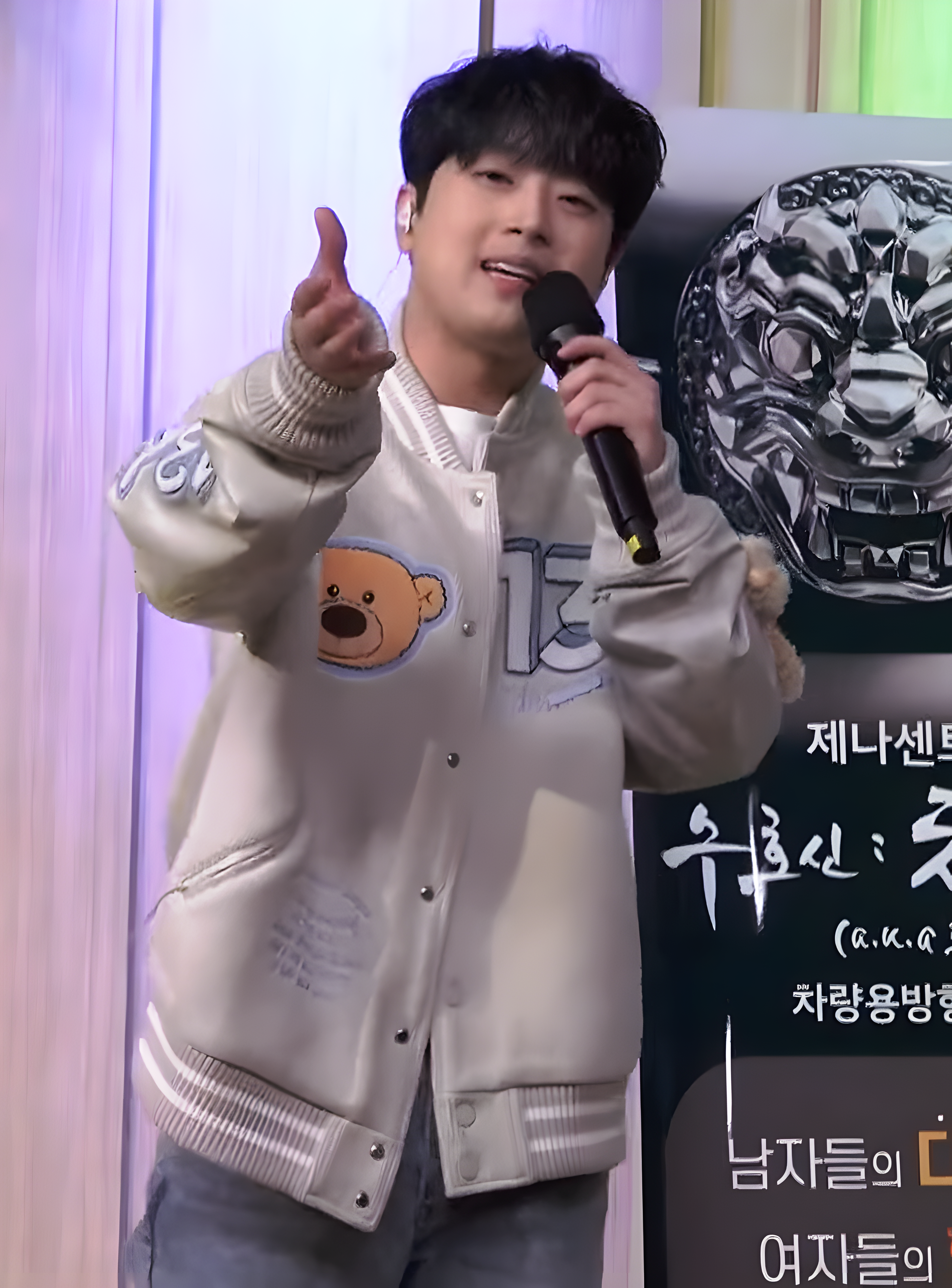
Lee Chan-won, winner of Grand Prize (Daesang) and Entertainer of the Year awards

Nominations for Grand Prize were revealed on December 21, 2024

(Winners denoted in bold)

Grand Prize (Daesang)	Viewers' Choice Best Program Award
**Lee Chan-won**; Yoo Jae-suk; Jeon Hyun-moo; Ryu Soo-young; Kim Jong-min	**Immortal Songs: Singing the Legend**; 2 Days & 1 Night 4; Synchro U; Boss in the Mirror; Stars' Top Recipe at Fun-Staurant; Gag Concert; Mr. House Husband
Top Excellence Award in Reality Category	Top Excellence Award in Show and Variety Category
**Kim Jun-ho - The Return of Superman**; **Jang Minho – Stars' Top Recipe at Fun-Staurant**; Pak Se-ri – Operation Pop-up Landing; Park Jin-young – The Ddanddara	**Shin Yun-seung - Gag Concert**; **Jo Se-ho – 2 Days & 1 Night 4**; DinDin – 2 Days & 1 Night 4; Kim Young-hee – Gag Concert; Kim Jun-hyun – Immortal Songs: Singing the Legend
Excellence Award in Reality Category	Excellence Award in Show and Variety Category
**Park Soo-hong – The Return of Superman**; **Jung Ji-seon – Boss in the Mirror**; Lee Min-woo – Mr. House Husband; Ha Seok-jin – Operation Pop-up Landing	**Lee Young-ji – The Seasons - Lee Young Ji's Rainbow**; **Lee Joon – 2 Days & 1 Night 4**; Lee Yong-jin – Synchro U; Lee Juck – Synchro U; Jung Beom Kyun – Gag Concert
Producer Special Award
**Kim Jong-min – 2 Days & 1 Night 4**
Rookie Award
Reality Category	Show and Variety Category
**Park Seo-jin – Mr. House Husband**; **Lee Sang-woo – Stars' Top Recipe at Fun-Staurant**; Nam Yoon-su – Stars' Top Recipe at Fun-Staurant; Park Yeong-gyu – Mr. House Husband; Lee Soon-sil – Boss in the Mirror	**Karina – Synchro U**; **Zico – The Seasons**; Na Hyun-Yeong – Gag Concert; Moon Sang-min – Music Bank
DJ Award	Digital Content Award
**Lee Gak-kyung – Lee Gak-kyung's Happy Time 4 o’clock**; **Cho Jung-sik – Jo Jeong-sik's FM Grand March**	**Shownu and Jungwoo – Nopogy**
Entertainer of the Year	Best Icon Award
**Kim Jong-min**; **Ryu Soo-young**; **Yoo Jae-suk**; **Lee Chan-won**; **Jeon Hyun-moo**	**The Return of Superman Children**; **Uhm Ji-in – Boss in the Mirror**; **Lee Yeonbok – Stars' Top Recipe at Fun-Staurant**
Best Challenger Award	Popularity Award
**Synchro U**	**Park Yeong-gyu – Mr. House Husband**; **Lee Mu-jin – LeeMujin Service**
Best Teamwork Award	Best Entertainer Award
**2 Days & 1 Night 4**	**Moon Se-yoon – 2 Days & 1 Night 4**; **Lee Juck – Synchro U**
Staff of the Year Award	Broadcast Writer Award
**MC Bae**	**Choi Hye-ran – Mr. House Husband**; **Yang Young-mi – The Seasons**
Best Idea Award
**Simgok Police Station – Gag Concert**
Best Couple Award
**Moon Sang-min and Minju – Music Bank**; **Eun Ji-won and Baek Ji-young – Mr. House Husband**; **Jeong Tae-ho and Nam Hyun-seung – Gag Concert**
