= Lee Ji-ae =

South Korean television personality

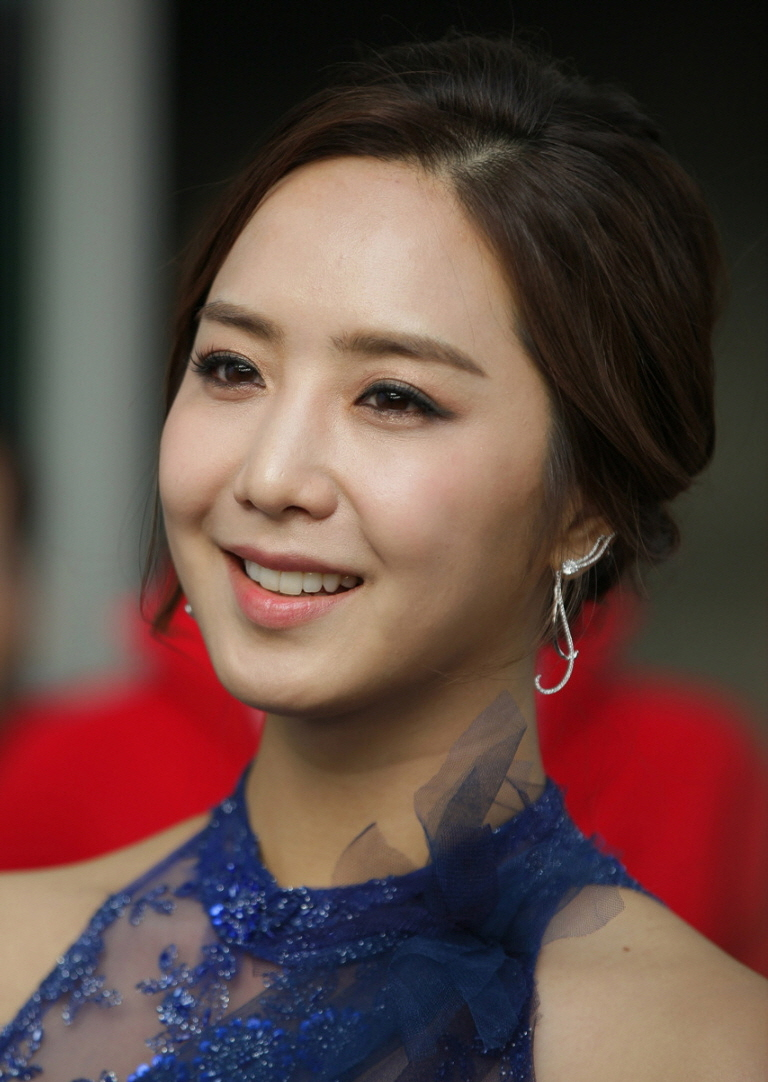
- Born: May 13, 1981 (age 44); Seoul, South Korea
- Education: Sungshin Women's University; Hanyang University
- Spouse: Kim Jung-geun (m. 2010)
- Children: 2

Korean name
- Hangul: 이지애
- Hanja: 李智愛
- RR: I Jiae
- MR: I Chiae

Lee Ji-ae (born May 13, 1981) is a South Korean former announcer and television personality. She is a former cast member in the variety show Real Men.

== Career ==
In 2006 Lee passed the Korean Broadcasting System (KBS) announcer recruitment exercise and was part of the 32nd batch of announcers. Initially she also applied to join the Republic of Korea Army but received her acceptance letter from KBS first, hence her career choice.

She was first posted to the Gangneung office and presented special features and programs concerning rural affairs (Gangneung is located in the mainly rural Gangwon Province) and KBS1TV's flagship arts and culture program Culture Zone (문화지대). In 2008 she replaced Lee Hyo-ri as one of the MCs of popular talk show SangSangPlus (상상 플러스), garnering her greater public recognition and praise from viewers. Since then she went on to host programs such as Top Band and the KBS Entertainment Awards.

In 2014 she resigned from KBS and signed with ChorokbaemJuna E&M, which later became Starit Entertainment following a series of mergers. Following her resignation from KBS, she went on a brief hiatus to earn her master's degree at Hanyang University.

== Personal life ==
In 2010, Lee married former MBC announcer Kim Jung-geun. The couple have a daughter (born in 2017) and a son (born in 2019).

Her husband's role as one of the union leaders during the 2012 KBS and MBC joint strike came to light, partly due to the fact that the couple worked for the competing broadcasters. After the strike ended, Kim was suspended and had his financial assets frozen when the president of MBC sued him and a fellow employee for leading the strike. In response, Lee expressed her support for her husband during an interview and publicly called on the government to intervene.
