= Park Ji-sun =

South Korean actress (1984–2020)

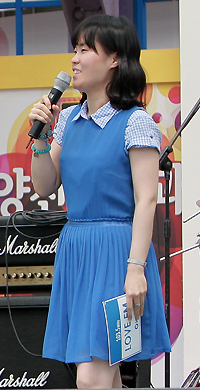
- Park in 2014
- Born: December 24, 1984; Bupyeong District, Incheon, South Korea
- Died: November 2, 2020 (aged 35); Mapo District, Seoul, South Korea
- Resting place: Incheon Family Park
- Notable work: KBS Gag Concert; KBS You Hee-yeol's Sketchbook; KBS Star Golden Bell; KBS Happy Together

Comedy career
- Years active: 2007–2020
- Genre: Comedy

Korean name
- Hangul: 박지선
- RR: Bak Jiseon
- MR: Pak Chisŏn

Park Ji-sun (Korean: 박지선; 24 December 1984 – 2 November 2020) was a South Korean comedian.

== Biography ==
Park was born on 24 December 1984 in Bupyeong District, Incheon. She attended Korea University before deciding to become a comedian. She debuted in 2007 through Korean Broadcasting System's 22nd open recruitment term for comedians. She made her first appearance in the comedy sketch segment of Gag Concert called "Gag Warrior 300" which brought her to public attention and won the Newcomer Award at the KBS Entertainment Awards in 2007.

Park had a chronic skin condition and a sunlight allergy. She also had been receiving treatment for an undisclosed medical condition and had told a journalist during a phone call on October 23, 2020 that she was going to have surgery and focus on recovering in November.

Park died on 2 November 2020, aged 35. Park's father called the police as he could not get in touch with her or her mother, as they were not answering their phones. Park and her mother were found deceased in Park's Seoul home by police. A one-page note presumed to be written by Park's mother was left behind. At the family's request, the contents of the note were not publicly released and no autopsy was performed. But according to Yonhap News Agency, the note said that Park's mother was not able to let her daughter suffer alone because of her illness. The cause of death has not been disclosed, although police suspect it was a suicide as there was no evidence of foul play.

Park's funeral service was initially set to take place at Ewha Womans University Mokdong Hospital at 5 p.m. 5 November, but was moved up to 11 a.m. of the same day. Park was also originally to be taken to Byeokjae Crematorium in Goyang, Gyeonggi, but Park and her mother will be taken to Incheon Family Park after the funeral service.

== Awards and nominations ==
Year	Award	Category	Nominated work	Result	Ref.
2007	KBS Entertainment Awards	Best Newcomer Award	—N/a	Won	
2008	KBS Entertainment Awards	Excellence Award in Comedy	Gag Concert	Won	
2010	KBS Entertainment Awards	Top Excellence Award in Comedy	Gag Concert	Won	
2012	SBS Entertainment Awards	Radio DJ Award	—N/a	Won	
