= Boss in the Mirror =

South Korean variety show

- Hangul: 사장님 귀는 당나귀 귀
- RR: Sajangnim gwineun dangnagwi gwi
- MR: Sajangnim kwinŭn tangnagwi kwi
- Genre: Variety show
- Presented by: Jun Hyun-Moo; Kim Sook; Kim Hee-chul
- Country of origin: South Korea
- Original language: Korean
- No. of seasons: 1
- No. of episodes: 148 + 1 Pilot

Production
- Running time: 90 minutes

Original release
- Network: KBS2
- Release: February 5, 2019 – present

Boss in the Mirror (Korean: 사장님 귀는 당나귀 귀) is a South Korean variety show hosted by Jeon Hyun-moo and Kim Sook. The show was initially aired as a pilot program on KBS2 on February 5–6, 2019. It premiered on April 28, 2019, as a regular program, and airs every Sunday at 17:00 (KST).

== Synopsis ==
This is a variety show where Korean bosses go through self-examination to create a better working environment for their employees. The show features a variety of industries and include guest appearances in the form of special MCs or people related to the bosses in the show.

== Host ==
=== Current MC ===
cast	broadcast period	Round	note
Kim sook	April 28, 2019 – March 6, 2022	Episodes 1 – 146	Absence from attending the 147 and 148 due to COVID-19
Kim sook	March 27, 2022 ~	Episodes 149 ~ Present	Absence from attending the 147 and 148 due to COVID-19
Jun Hyun-moo	April 28, 2019 ~	Episodes 1 ~ Present'	

=== Previous MC ===
cast	broadcast period	Round	note
Kim Yong-gun	April 28, 2019 – December 8, 2019	Episodes 1 – 33	
Shim Young-soon	November 10, 2019 – July 19, 2020	Episodes 29 – 65	
Hur Jae	January 30, 2022 – September 18, 2022	Episodes 142 – 174	Departure due to boss appearance
Kim Hee-chul	October 23, 2022 – May 12, 2024	Episodes 179 – 257	

== Cast ==
=== Current regular cast ===
Current Cast	Job	Broadcast period	Round	Note
Ji-Sun Jung	Chinese chef	January 15, 2023 ~	Episodes 190 ~ Present	The longest-running cast of all time
Yoshihiro Akiyama	Talent	June 25, 2023 ~	Episodes 213 ~ Present	
Heebab	Mukbang Creator	September 17, 2023 ~	Episodes 225 ~ Present	
Kim Heo-Seong	Hotel CEO	October 29, 2023 ~	Episodes 229 ~ Present	
Park Myung-soo	Comedian	January 14, 2024 ~	Episodes 240 ~ Present	

=== Semi-fixed cast ===
Current Cast	Job	Broadcast period	Round	Note
Lee Yeon-bok	Chinese chef	February 5, 2019 – May 5, 2019	Pilots 1 – 2	Appearing since the pilot
Lee Yeon-bok	Chinese chef	January 29, 2023 ~	Episodes 192 ~ Present	Appearing since the pilot
Byung-hyun Kim	Hamburger restaurant owner	August 29, 2021 – January 1, 2023	Episodes 121 – 188	
Byung-hyun Kim	Hamburger restaurant owner	March 5, 2023 ~	Episodes 197 ~ Present	
Jeong Ho-young	Japanese chef	August 22, 2021 – January 22, 2023	Episodes 120 – 191	
Jeong Ho-young	Japanese chef	May 21, 2023 ~	Episodes 208 ~ Present	
Kim Soo-mi	Actor	April 23, 2023 – April 30, 2023	Episodes 204 – 205	
Kim Soo-mi	Actor	September 10, 2023 ~	Episodes 224 ~ Present	

=== Previous cast ===
Cast	Job	Broadcast period	Round	Note
Kim Jun-ho	Comedian	February 5, 2019 – February 6, 2019	Pilots 1 – 2	
Park Won-soon	Seoul Special Market	February 5, 2019 – February 6, 2019	Pilots 1 – 2	
Tiger JK	Feelgood Music CEO	May 12, 2019 – July 21, 2019	Episodes 3 – 13	
Tiger JK	Feelgood Music CEO	December 13, 2020 – December 27, 2020	Episodes 86 – 88	
Won Hee-ryong	Jeju Special Self-Governing Province Governor	July 7, 2019 – October 6, 2019	Episodes 11 – 24	
Choi Hyun-seok	western chef	November 10, 2019 – December 29, 2019	Episodes 29 – 36	
Park Sul-nyeo	Hanbok Designer	January 5, 2020 – February 16, 2020	Episodes 37 – 43	
Park Sul-nyeo	Hanbok Designer	April 25, 2021 – May 23, 2021	Episodes 105 – 109	
Park Sul-nyeo	Hanbok Designer	January 30, 2022	Episode 142	
Sim Yeongsoon	Korean cuisine researcher	April 28, 2019 – July 19, 2020	Episodes 1 – 65	
Sim Yeongsoon	Korean cuisine researcher	March 21, 2021 – April 4, 2021	Episodes 100 – 102	
Sim Yeongsoon	Korean cuisine researcher	January 30, 2022	Episode 142	
Kim So-yeon	ESteem CEO	October 13, 2019 – July 12, 2020	Episodes 25 – 64	
Kim So-yeon	ESteem CEO	March 21, 2021 – April 4, 2021	Episodes 100 – 102	
Kim So-yeon	ESteem CEO	January 30, 2022	Episode 142	
Hey Jini	YouTuber	March 1, 2020 – June 21, 2020	Episodes 45 – 61	
Hey Jini	YouTuber	January 24, 2021 – April 4, 2021	Episodes 92 – 102	
Hey Jini	YouTuber	January 30, 2022	Episode 142	
Oh Joong Seok	photographer	July 26, 2020 – October 4, 2020	Episodes 66 – 76	
Oh Joong Seok	photographer	January 30, 2022	Episode 142	
Solar	singer	November 1, 2020 – December 6, 2020; May 5, 2021 – September 26, 2021	Episodes 80 – 85, 107–109, 115–120, 124–126	
Lim Seong-Bin	Interior designer	December 13, 2020 – December 27, 2020	Episodes 86 – 88	
Lim Seong-Bin	Interior designer	March 21, 2021 – April 4, 2021	Episodes 100 – 102	
Song Hoon	Italian cuisine expert	July 19, 2020 – January 24, 2021	Episodes 65 – 92	
Song Hoon	Italian cuisine expert	March 21, 2021 – April 4, 2021	Episodes 100 – 102	
Song Hoon	Italian cuisine expert	January 30, 2022	Episode 142	
Jeong Jae-Yong	KBS Sports Director	July 18, 2021	Episode 117	Special VCR Cast
Kim Jung-hwan, Gu Bon-gil, Kim Jun-ho, Oh Sang-uk	The men's fencing team	August 8, 2021 – August 15, 2021	Episodes 118 – 119	Special VCR Cast
Tony Ahn	TN Entertainment CEO	June 6, 2021 – September 19, 2021	Episodes 111 – 124	
Tony Ahn	TN Entertainment CEO	January 30, 2022	Episode 142	
Hyun Joo-yup	Broadcaster and former basketball coach	April 28, 2019 – October 27, 2019	Episodes 1 – 27	
Hyun Joo-yup	Broadcaster and former basketball coach	May 10, 2020 – October 17, 2021	Episodes 55 – 128	
Hyun Joo-yup	Broadcaster and former basketball coach	February 20, 2022	Episode 144	

== Ratings ==
- In the ratings below, the highest rating for the show is in red, and the lowest rating for the show is in blue each year.
- Highest ratings are listed for each episode.
- "—" denotes episode didn't enter top 20 in Nielsen Korea ratings.

=== 2019 ===
List of ratings in 2019 (Episode 1–36)
Boss in the Mirror : South Korea viewers per episode (millions)

Episode	Episode number																	
Episode	1	2	3	4	5	6	7	8	9	10	11	12	13	14	15	16	17	18
1–18	N/A	N/A	N/A	N/A	0.945	N/A	N/A	N/A	N/A	1.225	1.228	1.211	N/A	1.277	1.122	1.271	1.236	1.164
19–36	1.340	1.196	1.324	1.323	1.113	1.370	1.138	1.176	1.130	1.326	1.318	1.729	1.799	1.716	1.913	1.503	1.684	1.924

Source: Audience measurement performed nationwide by Nielsen Korea.

Average TV viewership ratings
Ep.	Original broadcast date	Nielsen Korea	
Ep.	Original broadcast date	Nationwide	Seoul
Pilot	February 5	8.1% (5th)	7.9% (4th)
1	April 28	5.7% (20th)	5.6% (20th)
2	May 5	—	—
3	May 12	—	—
4	May 19	—	—
5	May 26	6.1% (16th)	—
6	June 2	—	—
7	June 9	6.1% (18th)	6.8% (17th)
8	June 16	—	—
9	June 23	6.1% (19th)	6.5% (18th)
10	June 30	6.7% (12th)	6.5% (15th)
11	July 7	7.1% (15th)	7.4% (14th)
12	July 14	7.4% (15th)	7.4% (15th)
13	July 21	6.6% (18th)	6.4% (20th)
14	July 28	7.5% (14th)	8.1% (12th)
15	August 4	6.1% (18th)	—
16	August 11	7.1% (14th)	6.6% (17th)
17	August 18	7.8% (12th)	7.6% (14th)
18	August 25	7.1% (14th)	6.9% (14th)
19	September 1	7.9% (11th)	7.5% (12th)
20	September 8	7.0% (15th)	6.1% (19th)
21	September 15	7.9% (12th)	7.8% (15th)
22	September 22	8.4% (10th)	7.1% (14th)
23	September 29	7.0% (12th)	6.3% (15th)
24	October 6	7.8% (11th)	7.4% (12th)
25	October 13	6.9% (13th)	6.0% (17th)
26	October 20	7.7% (11th)	8.2% (10th)
27	October 27	6.3% (15th)	5.7% (19th)
28	November 3	8.0% (10th)	7.8% (12th)
29	November 10	8.1% (12th)	8.1% (11th)
30	November 17	9.4% (8th)	9.0% (8th)
31	November 24	10.4% (8th)	9.8% (9th)
32	December 1	10.1% (8th)	10.0% (8th)
33	December 8	11.2% (9th)	10.8% (9th)
34	December 15	9.3% (11th)	8.5% (12th)
35	December 22	9.5% (12th)	9.1% (12th)
36	December 29	11.0% (9th)	10.3% (12th)

=== 2020 ===
List of ratings in 2020 (Episode 37–88)
Boss in the Mirror : South Korea viewers per episode (millions)

Episode	Episode number												
Episode	1	2	3	4	5	6	7	8	9	10	11	12	13
37–49	1.900	1.625	1.859	1.275	1.560	1.898	1.648	1.756	1.870	1.838	1.578	1.646	1.616
50–62	1.531	1.544	1.885	1.304	1.326	1.430	1.454	1.585	1.566	1.380	1.350	1.658	1.525
63-75	1.684	1.744	1.499	1.283	1.589	1.400	1.447	1.436	1.651	2.051	1.820	1.379	1.392
76–88	1.525	1.294	1.571	1.632	1.731	1.619	1.949	1.863	1.989	2.045	1.974	1.604	2.062

Source: Audience measurement performed nationwide by Nielsen Korea.

Average TV viewership ratings
Ep.	Original broadcast date	Nielsen Korea	
Ep.	Original broadcast date	Nationwide	Seoul
37	January 5	10.9% (8th)	10.5% (9th)
38	January 12	9.7% (10th)	9.7% (9th)
39	January 19	10.3% (9th)	10.2% (8th)
40	January 26	7.6% (13th)	7.7% (12th)
41	February 2	9.3% (13th)	9.2% (12th)
42	February 9	10.3% (9th)	10.7% (7th)
43	February 16	9.3% (13th)	9.7% (11th)
44	February 23	9.2% (14th)	9.2% (12th)
45	March 1	9.6% (12th)	10.1% (9th)
46	March 8	10.0% (13th)	10.6% (10th)
47	March 15	8.4% (14th)	8.5% (15th)
48	March 22	9.3% (14th)	9.3% (12th)
49	March 29	9.4% (12th)	9.0% (13th)
50	April 5	7.9% (14th)	7.8% (15th)
51	April 12	8.5% (14th)	8.1% (14th)
52	April 19	9.9% (9th)	9.7% (9th)
53	April 26	6.9% (18th)	6.8% (19th)
54	May 3	7.5% (14th)	6.8% (15th)
55	May 10	7.3% (13th)	7.1% (15th)
56	May 17	7.8% (12th)	7.7% (13th)
57	May 24	8.5% (13th)	8.7% (14th)
58	May 31	8.4% (12th)	8.5% (12th)
59	June 7	7.8% (14th)	7.6% (13th)
60	June 14	8.0% (14th)	8.0% (13th)
61	June 21	9.6% (9th)	9.7% (8th)
62	June 28	8.7% (12th)	8.9% (10th)
63	July 5	9.3% (12th)	9.5% (11th)
64	July 12	10.5% (7th)	10.7% (7th)
65	July 19	8.2% (14th)	8.5% (10th)
66	July 26	6.7% (15th)	6.7% (16th)
67	August 2	8.5% (12th)	9.3% (11th)
68	August 9	8.3% (13th)	9.1% (11th)
69	August 16	8.2% (13th)	8.2% (10th)
70	August 23	8.1% (14th)	8.5% (13th)
71	August 30	9.1% (14th)	9.5% (11th)
72	September 6	11.0% (6th)	10.8% (7th)
73	September 13	9.8% (8th)	10.1% (7th)
74	September 20	8.6% (10th)	9.1% (9th)
75	September 27	8.7% (9th)	9.1% (8th)
76	October 4	8.6% (12th)	8.7% (12th)
77	October 11	8.0% (12th)	7.8% (13th)
78	October 18	8.4% (11th)	8.8% (9th)
79	October 25	8.8% (10th)	9.3% (11th)
80	November 1	10.0% (9th)	10.4% (8th)
81	November 8	9.1% (10th)	9.0% (9th)
82	November 15	10.2% (7th)	10.9% (6th)
83	November 22	10.4% (8th)	10.2% (8th)
84	November 29	11.2% (7th)	11.7% (7th)
85	December 6	11.7% (7th)	12.0% (6th)
86	December 13	10.5% (11th)	10.8% (8th)
87	December 20	9.0% (11th)	8.9% (11th)
88	December 27	11.7% (8th)	11.9% (7th)

=== 2021 ===
List of ratings in 2021 (Episode 89–137)
Boss in the Mirror : South Korea viewers per episode (millions)

Episode	Episode number												
Episode	1	2	3	4	5	6	7	8	9	10	11	12	13
89–101	2.148	1.966	1.817	1.834	1.766	1.806	1.964	1.563	1.807	1.615	1.612	1.589	1.783
102–114	1.609	1.531	1.520	1.519	1.304	1.420	1.872	1.609	1.396	1.257	1.458	1.309	1.264
115–127	1.101	1.074	1.040	1.254	1.098	1.329	1.275	1.273	1.121	0.828	1.054	0.815	0.931
128–137	1.009	1.140	1.002	0.994	1.021	1.299	1.226	1.326	1.070	1.152	–		

Source: Audience measurement performed nationwide by Nielsen Korea.

Average TV viewership ratings
Ep.	Original broadcast date	Nielsen Korea	
Ep.	Original broadcast date	Nationwide	Seoul
89	January 3	12.3% (7th)	12.4% (6th)
90	January 10	10.9% (7th)	10.9% (8th)
91	January 17	10.4% (9th)	11.1% (9th)
92	January 24	10.1% (8th)	9.7% (9th)
93	January 31	9.5% (7th)	9.8% (7th)
94	February 7	9.4% (8th)	9.1% (9th)
95	February 14	10.6% (7th)	10.7% (8th)
96	February 21	8.9% (10th)	9.1% (8th)
97	February 28	10.5% (7th)	10.2% (8th)
98	March 7	8.8% (9th)	9.2% (9th)
99	March 14	9.3% (8th)	9.8% (8th)
100	March 21	8.8% (9th)	8.9% (9th)
101	March 28	9.3% (9th)	10.0% (8th)
102	April 4	9.3% (9th)	9.4% (8th)
103	April 11	8.1% (9th)	8.2% (9th)
104	April 18	8.3% (11th)	7.5% (12th)
105	April 25	8.2% (9th)	7.6% (10th)
106	May 2	7.6% (11th)	7.5% (10th)
107	May 9	8.3% (8th)	8.0% (10th)
108	May 16	9.9% (7th)	9.6% (9th)
109	May 23	9.3% (8th)	8.6% (8th)
110	May 30	8.4% (9th)	8.1% (11th)
111	June 6	6.7% (11th)	6.2% (13th)
112	June 13	8.1% (8th)	8.6% (6th)
113	June 20	7.6% (9th)	7.5% (10th)
114	June 27	7.2% (11th)	6.8% (11th)
115	July 4	5.9% (9th)	5.9% (7th)
116	July 11	6.2% (8th)	5.8% (8th)
117	July 18	6.0% (10th)	5.7% (13th)
118	August 9	7.1% (6th)	6.5% (8th)
119	August 15	6.0% (7th)	5.7% (8th)
120	August 22	7.2% (7th)	7.6% (6th)
121	August 29	7.2% (7th)	7.2% (5th)
122	September 5	6.9% (6th)	6.5% (5th)
123	September 12	5.9% (8th)	5.0% (10th)
124	September 19	4.9% (12th)	4.6% (15th)
125	September 26	5.7% (11th)	5.2% (14th)
126	October 3	4.9% (14th)	5.1% (13th)
127	October 10	5.6% (9th)	6.1% (6th)
128	October 17	5.7% (8th)	
129	October 24	6.2% (7th)	5.8% (9th)
130	October 31	5.6% (8th)	5.3% (9th)
131	November 14	5.7% (10th)	6.1% (7th)
132	November 21	6.0% (7th)	5.7% (8th)
133	November 28	7.3% (5th)	7.4% (5th)
134	December 5	6.4% (8th)	6.3% (7th)
135	December 12	7.5% (7th)	7.6% (6th)
136	December 19	5.9% (12th)	5.9% (11th)
137	December 26	6.9% (9th)	6.7% (9th)

=== 2022 ===
List of ratings in 2022 (Episode 138–187)
Boss in the Mirror : South Korea viewers per episode (millions)

Episode	Episode number												
Episode	1	2	3	4	5	6	7	8	9	10	11	12	13
139–151	1.237	1.426	1.477	1.257	0.837	1.902	1.625	1.090	1.113	1.343	1.269	1.099	0.968
152–164	0.788	0.879	0.848	0.993	1.036	1.137	1.109	1.112	1.057	1.066	1.096	1.101	1.103
165–177	1.038	1.122	1.240	1.343	1.132	0.892	0.987	1.042	1.085	0.958	1.019	1.030	1.041
178–187	1.057	0.972	1.058	0.890	1.123	0.867	1.169	1.083	1.017	1.120	1.045	–	

Source: Audience measurement performed nationwide by Nielsen Korea.

Average TV viewership ratings
Ep.	Original broadcast date	Nielsen Korea	
Ep.	Original broadcast date	Nationwide	Seoul
138	January 2	6.6% (8th)	6.3% (9th)
139	January 9	7.7% (7th)	7.5% (6th)
140	January 16	7.8% (9th)	7.7% (9th)
141	January 23	7.0% (6th)	7.2% (5th)
142	January 30	4.8% (13th)	4.2% (18th)
143	February 6	10.3% (3rd)	10.2% (3rd)
144	February 20 (Note: No broadcast on February 13 due to the live coverage of the 2022 Beijing Winter Olympics.)	8.9% (4th)	8,9% (4th)
145	February 27	6.0% (10th)	5.6% (10th)
146	March 6	6.2% (10th)	6.0% (10th)
147	March 13	7.5% (6th)	7.4% (6th)
148	March 20	6.8% (7th)	6.6% (7th)
149	March 27	5.8% (8th)	6.0% (6th)
150	April 3	5.4% (9th)	5.5% (9th)
151	April 10	4.4% (15th)	4.2% (18th)
152	April 17	4.7% (10th)	4.5% (13th)
153	April 24	4.6% (11th)	4.2% (16th)
154	May 1	5.6% (7th)	5.5% (7th)
155	May 8	5.9% (6th)	6.0% (5th)
156	May 15	6.6% (5th)	6.7% (5th)
157	May 22	6.2% (7th)	5.4% (7th)
158	May 29	6.6% (6th)	6.2% (6th)
159	June 5	6.5% (5th)	5.4% (6th)
160	June 12	6.1% (7th)	6.1% (6th)
161	June 19	6.5% (5th)	6.0% (5th)
162	June 26	6.0% (6th)	5.9% (6th)
163	July 3	6.2% (6th)	5.7% (6th)
164	July 10	5.9% (8th)	5.9% (7th)
165	July 17	6.6% (7th)	6.4% (7th)
166	July 24	7.2% (6th)	7.2% (5th)
167	July 31	8.1% (4th)	8.0% (5th)
168	August 7	6.1% (8th)	5.8% (7th)
169	August 14	5.0% (8th)	4.9% (9th)
170	August 21	5.8% (8th)	5.3% (6th)
171	August 28	6.7% (6th)	6.3% (6th)
172	September 4	6.4% (9th)	6.2% (8th)
173	September 11	5.5% (6th)	5.5% (5th)
174	September 18	5.7% (8th)	5.3% (7th)
175	September 25	5.5% (7th)	4.7% (9th)
176	October 2	6.0% (6th)	6.0% (5th)
177	October 9	6.0% (7th)	6.3% (5th)
178	October 16	5.7% (7th)	5.4% (7th)
179	October 23	6.2% (5th)	5.9% (6th)
180	November 6	5.3% (7th)	5.0% (8th)
181	November 13	6.6% (6th)	6.8% (5th)
182	November 20	5.5% (10th)	5.5% (8th)
183	November 27	6.4% (10th)	6.1% (11th)
184	December 4	6.1% (7th)	5.8% (8th)
185	December 11	6.0% (7th)	5.7% (6th)
186	December 18	6.5% (8th)	6.1% (7th)
187	December 25	6.2% (8th)	5.5% (8th)

=== 2023 ===
List of ratings in 2023 (Episode 188–238)

Average TV viewership ratings
Ep.	Original broadcast date	Nielsen Korea	
Ep.	Original broadcast date	Nationwide	Seoul
188	January 1	5.8% (8th)	5.3% (9th)
189	January 8	6.9% (4th)	7.0% (4th)
190	January 15	6.9% (4th)	6.5% (5th)
191	January 22	4.0% (13th)	3.5% (17th)
192	January 29	7.8% (5th)	7.7% (5th)
193	February 5	6.5% (5th)	6.5% (5th)
194	February 12	6.6% (6th)	6.3% (5th)
195	February 19	5.3% (9th)	5.5% (5th)
196	February 26	5.3% (7th)	5.3% (5th)
197	March 5	5.9% (6th)	6.2% (5th)
198	March 12	6.9% (4th)	6.7% (4th)
199	March 19	5.8% (6th)	5.7% (5th)
200	March 26	6.7% (4th)	6.9% (4th)
201	April 2	4.9% (7th)	4.7% (6th)
202	April 9	5.2% (7th)	4.8% (7th)
203	April 16	5.8% (6th)	5.4% (6th)
204	April 23	6.7% (4th)	6.7% (4th)
205	April 30	4.0% (10th)	3.8% (10th)
206	May 7	5.7% (6th)	4.9% (5th)
207	May 14	4.4% (8th)	4.1% (8th)
208	May 21	5.5% (6th)	5.3% (5th)
209	May 28	6.3% (4th)	6.1% (4th)
210	June 4	5.8% (5th)	5.6% (5th)
211	June 11	5.0% (8th)	4.7% (7th)
212	June 18	5.4% (7th)	4.9% (6th)
213	June 25	5.1% (7th)	4.5% (8th)
214	July 2	5.7% (5th)	5.6% (6th)
215	July 9	5.5% (8th)	5.4% (6th)
216	July 16	8.3% (3th)	7.7% (3th)
217	July 23	6.2% (6th)	6.0% (5th)
218	July 30	5.9% (6th)	5.8% (6th)
219	August 6	6.2% (5th)	6.4% (5th)
220	August 13	5.1% (8th)	5.4% (6th)
221	August 20	5.2% (8th)	4.9% (6th)
222	August 27	4.6% (8th)	4.5% (8th)
223	September 3	5.4% (6th)	5.1% (7th)
224	September 10	5.8% (4th)	5.3% (5th)
225	September 17	5.2% (7th)	4.5% (8th)
226	October 8	5.2% (7th)	5.0% (7th)
227	October 15	4.7% (8th)	4.2% (9th)
228	October 22	4.8% (7th)	4.4% (10th)
229	October 29	4.8% (8th)	4.4% (9th)
230	November 5	6.4% (4th)	5.6% (5th)
231	November 12	5.5% (5th)	5.3% (6th)
232	November 19	5.4% (6th)	4.7% (7th)
233	November 26	6.2% (5th)	5.4% (7th)
234	December 3	5.8% (7th)	5.5% (8th)
235	December 10	5.1% (9th)	4.6% (9th)
236	December 17	% (th)	% (th)
237	December 24	% (th)	% (th)
238	December 31	5.2% (9th)	4.7% (9th)

=== 2024 ===
List of ratings in 2024 (Episode 239–286)

Average TV viewership ratings
Ep.	Original broadcast date	Nielsen Korea	
Ep.	Original broadcast date	Nationwide	Seoul
239	January 7	% (th)	% (th)
240	January 14	% (th)	% (th)
241	January 21	% (th)	% (th)
242	January 28	% (th)	% (th)
243	February 4	% (th)	% (th)
244	February 11	% (th)	% (th)
245	February 18	% (th)	% (th)
246	February 25	% (th)	% (th)
247	March 3	% (th)	% (th)
248	March 10	% (th)	% (th)
249	March 17	% (th)	% (th)
250	March 24	% (th)	% (th)
251	March 31	% (th)	% (th)
252	April 7	% (th)	% (th)
253	April 14	% (th)	% (th)
254	April 21	% (th)	% (th)
255	April 28	% (th)	% (th)
256	May 5	% (th)	% (th)
257	May 12	% (th)	% (th)
258	May 19	% (th)	% (th)
259	May 26	% (th)	% (th)
260	June 2	% (th)	% (th)
261	June 9	% (th)	% (th)
262	June 16	% (th)	% (th)
263	June 23	% (th)	% (th)
264	June 30	% (th)	% (th)
265	July 7	% (th)	% (th)
266	July 14	% (th)	% (th)
267	July 21	% (th)	% (th)
268	August 11	% (th)	% (th)
269	August 18	% (th)	% (th)
270	August 25	% (th)	% (th)
271	September 1	% (th)	% (th)
272	September 8	% (th)	% (th)
273	September 15	% (th)	% (th)
274	September 22	% (th)	% (th)
275	September 29	% (th)	% (th)
276	October 6	% (th)	% (th)
277	October 20	% (th)	% (th)
278	October 27	% (th)	% (th)
279	November 3	% (th)	% (th)
280	November 10	% (th)	% (th)
281	November 17	% (th)	% (th)
282	November 24	% (th)	% (th)
283	December 1	% (th)	% (th)
284	December 8	% (th)	% (th)
285	December 15	% (th)	% (th)
286	December 22	% (th)	% (th)

=== 2025 ===
List of ratings in 2025 (Episode 287–337)
Boss in the Mirror : South Korea viewers per episode (thousands)

Episode	Episode number											
Episode	1	2	3	4	5	6	7	8	9	10	11	12
287–298	1155	1118	1001	838	1041	1130	933	1131	950	900	1060	859
299–310	1098	837	886	797	893	670	789	735	783	767	856	781
311–322	658	822	900	947	877	735	895	803	TBD	1032	996	895
323–334	724	814	977	610	916	764	782	839	999	801	953	670
335–337	879	797	852	–								

Source: Audience measurement performed nationwide by Nielsen Korea.

Average TV viewership ratings
Ep.	Original broadcast date	Nielsen Korea	
Ep.	Original broadcast date	Nationwide	Seoul
287	January 5	5.8% (7th)	5.4% (7th)
288	January 12	6.0% (7th)	5.8% (8th)
289	January 19	5.3% (8th)	5.3% (7th)
290	January 26	4.8% (9th)	4.6% (9th)
291	February 2	5.7% (8th)	5.6% (7th)
292	February 9	5.6% (6th)	5.0% (7th)
293	February 16	5.2% (8th)	5.1% (7th)
294	February 23	5.9% (5th)	5.8% (5th)
295	March 2	5.3% (7th)	5.6% (5th)
296	March 9	5.0% (8th)	5.1% (7th)
297	March 16	5.7% (7th)	5.6% (7th)
298	March 23	4.7% (7th)	4.7% (6th)
299	March 30	5.7% (6th)	5.5% (6th)
300	April 6	4.7% (9th)	4.5% (9th)
301	April 13	4.7% (8th)	5.0% (6th)
302	April 20	4.4% (7th)	4.3% (8th)
303	April 27	4.7% (7th)	4.3% (8th)
304	May 4	4.0% (8th)	3.6% (10th)
305	May 11	4.3% (8th)	4.2% (8th)
306	May 18	4.2% (9th)	4.1% (10th)
307	May 25	4.1% (10th)	4.1% (11th)
308	June 1	4.0% (9th)	4.0% (9th)
309	June 8	4.7% (7th)	4.8% (8th)
310	June 15	4.0% (10th)	4.2% (10th)
311	June 22	3.5% (11th)	3.2% (13th)
312	June 29	4.2% (10th)	4.0% (11th)
313	July 6	4.9% (8th)	4.8% (8th)
314	July 13	5.1% (8th)	5.0% (8th)
315	July 20	4.9% (6th)	4.8% (6th)
316	July 27	4.2% (10th)	4.1% (10th)
317	August 3	4.5% (8th)	4.4% (8th)
318	August 10	4.4% (8th)	4.2% (9th)
319	August 17	% (th)	% (th)
320	August 24	5.5% (8th)	5.4% (7th)
321	August 31	5.3% (7th)	4.8% (9th)
322	September 7	4.4% (8th)	4.4% (8th)
323	September 14	3.9% (10th)	3.8% (10th)
324	September 21	4.6% (7th)	4.3% (7th)
325	September 28	5.1% (6th)	5.1% (6th)
326	October 5	3.6% (10th)	3.2% (12th)
327	October 12	4.7% (7th)	4.0% (12th)
328	October 19	4.1% (8th)	3.7% (12th)
329	November 2	4.2% (9th)	3.7% (12th)
330	November 9	4.7% (7th)	4.4% (7th)
331	November 16	5.0% (6th)	4.4% (8th)
332	November 23	4.6% (8th)	4.1% (8th)
333	November 30	5.2% (7th)	4.7% (7th)
334	December 7	3.6% (11th)	3.2% (13th)
335	December 14	4.8% (8th)	4.5% (9th)
336	December 21	4.3% (7th)	3.9% (8th)
337	December 28	4.3% (10th)	4.3% (9th)

=== 2026 ===
List of ratings in 2026 (Episode 338–Present)
Boss in the Mirror : South Korea viewers per episode (thousands)

Episode	Episode number											
Episode	1	2	3	4	5	6	7	8	9	10	11	12
338–349	834	884	908	967	1007	852	608	1034	670	881	790	640
350–361	668	704	633	637	746	742	647	628	562	687	610	718
362–373	596	610	699	710	718	825	671	672	TBD	TBD	TBD	TBD

Source: Audience measurement performed nationwide by Nielsen Korea.

Average TV viewership ratings
Ep.	Original broadcast date	Nielsen Korea	
Ep.	Original broadcast date	Nationwide	Seoul
338	January 4	4.4% (10th)	3.8% (14th)
339	January 11	4.5% (10th)	4.0% (11th)
340	January 18	4.9% (8th)	4.6% (9th)
341	January 25	4.9% (9th)	4.9% (9th)
342	February 1	5.1% (8th)	4.7% (10th)
343	February 8	4.5% (10th)	4.4% (10th)
344	February 15	3.2% (12th)	2.9% (15th)
345	February 22	5.3% (7th)	4.8% (9th)
346	March 1	3.4% (11th)	3.2% (10th)
347	March 8	4.5% (11th)	4.3% (10th)
348	March 15	4.2% (7th)	3.5% (11th)
349	March 22	3.4% (11th)	3.1% (14th)
350	March 29	3.5% (13th)	3.6% (11th)
351	April 5	3.7% (8th)	3.1% (12th)
352	April 12	3.4% (11th)	3.1% (11th)
353	April 19	3.6% (10th)	3.0% (11th)
354	April 26	3.7% (10th)	3.6% (11th)
355	May 3	4.1% (9th)	3.7% (9th)
356	May 10	3.5% (11th)	2.7% (13th)
357	May 17	3.2% (11th)	2.6% (15th)
358	May 24	3.1% (12th)	2.6% (13th)
359	May 31	4.0% (8th)	3.7% (8th)
360	June 7	3.2% (11th)	3.0% (11th)
361	June 14	3.5% (10th)	3.4% (11th)
362	June 21	3.1% (12th)	2.9% (13th)
363	June 28	3.2% (8th)	2.9% (11th)
364	July 5	3.6% (10th)	3.1% (13th)
365	July 12	3.8% (12th)	3.4% (13th)
366	July 19	3.7% (10th)	3.1% (13th)
367	July 26	4.2% (9th)	3.6% (11th)
368	August 2	3.4% (11th)	3.2% (12th)
369	August 9	3.4% (11th)	3.0% (13th)
370	August 16	% (th)	% (th)
		% (th)	% (th)
		% (th)	% (th)
		% (th)	% (th)
		% (th)	% (th)
		% (th)	% (th)
		% (th)	% (th)
		% (th)	% (th)
		% (th)	% (th)
		% (th)	% (th)
		% (th)	% (th)
		% (th)	% (th)
		% (th)	% (th)
		% (th)	% (th)
		% (th)	% (th)
		% (th)	% (th)
		% (th)	% (th)
		% (th)	% (th)
		% (th)	% (th)
		% (th)	% (th)
		% (th)	% (th)
		% (th)	% (th)
		% (th)	% (th)
		% (th)	% (th)
		% (th)	% (th)
		% (th)	% (th)
		% (th)	% (th)
		% (th)	% (th)
		% (th)	% (th)
		% (th)	% (th)
		% (th)	% (th)
		% (th)	% (th)

== Awards and nominations ==
Name of the award ceremony, year presented, category, nominee of the award, and the result of the nomination
Award ceremony	Year	Category	Nominee / Work	Result	Ref.
KBS Entertainment Awards	2019	Hot Issue Entertainer Award	Yang Chi-seung	Won	
KBS Entertainment Awards	2019	Excellence Award (Entertainment Category)	Choi Hyun-seok	Nominated	
KBS Entertainment Awards	2019	Top Excellence Award (Entertainment Category)	Hyun Joo-yup	Nominated	
KBS Entertainment Awards	2019	Rookie Award in Show & Entertainment	Shim Young Soon	Won	
KBS Entertainment Awards	2019	Viewers' Choice Best Program Award	Boss in the Mirror	Nominated	
KBS Entertainment Awards	2020	Best Entertainer Award (Reality Category)	Yang Chi-seung	Won	
KBS Entertainment Awards	2020	Grand Prize (Daesang)	Kim Sook	Won	
KBS Entertainment Awards	2020	Top Excellence Award (Reality Category)	Hyun Joo-yup	Won	
KBS Entertainment Awards	2020	Excellence Award (Reality Category)	Yang Chi-seung	Nominated	
KBS Entertainment Awards	2020	Rookie Award (Reality Category)	Hur Jae	Nominated	
KBS Entertainment Awards	2020	Viewers' Choice Best Program Award	Boss in the Mirror	Nominated	
KBS Entertainment Awards	2021	Best Entertainer Award (Reality Category)	Kim Byung-hyun	Won	
KBS Entertainment Awards	2021	Best Entertainer Award (Show/Variety Category)	Solar	Won	
KBS Entertainment Awards	2021	Entertainer of the Year	Kim Sook and Jun Hyun-moo	Won	
KBS Entertainment Awards	2021	Hot Issue TV Personality Award	Jung Ho-young	Won	
KBS Entertainment Awards	2021	Top Excellence Award (Reality Category)	Hur Jae	Won	
KBS Entertainment Awards	2021	Rookie Award (Reality Category)	Kim Byung-hyun	Nominated	
KBS Entertainment Awards	2021	Viewers' Choice Best Program Award	Boss in the Mirror	Nominated	
KBS Entertainment Awards	2022	Viewers' Choice Best Program Award	Boss in the Mirror	Nominated	
KBS Entertainment Awards	2022	Top Excellence Award in Reality Category	Hur Jae	Nominated	
KBS Entertainment Awards	2022	Excellence Award in Reality Category	Kim Byung-hyun	Won	
KBS Entertainment Awards	2022	Producer Special Award	Hur Jae	Won	
KBS Entertainment Awards	2022	Best Icon Award	Boss in the Mirror Bosses	Won	
KBS Entertainment Awards	2023	Entertainer of the Year	Jeon Hyun-moo	Won	
KBS Entertainment Awards	2023	Entertainer of the Year	Kim Sook	Won	
KBS Entertainment Awards	2023	Best Icon Award	Choo Sung-hoon	Won	
KBS Entertainment Awards	2023	Rookie Award (Reality Category)	Ji-seon Jeong	Won	
KBS Entertainment Awards	2024	Entertainer of the Year	Jeon Hyun-moo	Won	
KBS Entertainment Awards	2024	Viewer's Choice Best Program Award	Boss in the Mirror	Nominated	
KBS Entertainment Awards	2024	Excellence Award (Reality)	Jung Ji-seon	Won	
KBS Entertainment Awards	2024	Rookie Award (Reality)	Lee Soon-sil	Nominated	
KBS Entertainment Awards	2024	Best Icon Award	Uhm Ji-in	Won	
KBS Entertainment Awards	2025	Daesang (Grand Prize)	Jeon Hyun-moo	Won	
KBS Entertainment Awards	2025	Entertainer of the Year	Jeon Hyun-moo	Won	
KBS Entertainment Awards	2025	Entertainer of the Year	Kim Sook	Nominated	
KBS Entertainment Awards	2025	Viewer's Choice Best Program Award	Boss in the Mirror	Nominated	
KBS Entertainment Awards	2025	Top Excellence Award (Reality)	Uhm Ji-in	Nominated	
KBS Entertainment Awards	2025	Top Excellence Award (Reality)	Park Myung-soo	Nominated	
KBS Entertainment Awards	2025	Excellence Award (Reality)	Lee Soon-sil	Nominated	
KBS Entertainment Awards	2025	Producer Special Award	Uhm Ji-in	Won	
KBS Entertainment Awards	2025	Popularity Award	Jung Ji-seon	Won	
KBS Entertainment Awards	2025	Writer Award	Myung Min-ah	Won	
KBS Entertainment Awards	2025	Rookie Award (Reality)	David Lee	Nominated	
