= Sponge (TV program) =

South Korean variety show

- Also known as: Sponge 2.0; Sponge 0
- Hangul: 스펀지
- RR: Seupeonji
- MR: Sŭp'ŏnji
- Directed by: Lee Hwang-sun
- Presented by: Lee Hwi-jae; Kim Kyung-ran
- Country of origin: South Korea
- Original language: Korean
- No. of episodes: 441

Production
- Producer: Lee Hwang-sun
- Running time: Approx. 60 minutes per episode

Original release
- Network: KBS2
- Release: November 8, 2003 – September 21, 2012

Sponge (Korean: 스펀지) is a South Korean television show that aired on KBS2 from November 8, 2003, to September 21, 2012. The show is an infotainment program that deals with factoids and trivia, and tests and proves (or disproves) pieces of knowledge. Facts are usually submitted by viewers, though sometimes the TV station finds facts on their own. In 2007, the program was rebooted as Sponge 2.0 and shifted its focus to useful and necessary knowledge for a general audience. It was rebooted again and renamed Sponge 0 in 2010 but returned to its original name in March 2012.

Sponge saw popularity among young audiences; at the peak of its fame, some elementary schools incorporated it into their homework. It was adapted into a book series, the first 3 copies of which sold over 200,000 copies. The show was runner-up for the 2005 Asian Television Awards' Best Infotainment Program prize, and it reached the finals at the 2007 Rose d'Or. Sponge ended its 9-year run in 2012 on account of topic exhaustion.

== Hosts ==
The show had two hosts: Kim Kyung-ran and Lee Hwi-jae. Additionally each week a panel of celebrities is present.

=== Former hosts ===
- 1st: Hwang Soo-gyeong
- 2nd: Kim Kyung-ran
- 3rd: Goh Min-jeong

All of them (from the list) are the KBS announcers.

== Format ==
Each piece of trivia is introduced as a sentence with a blank missing. A panel of guests including singers, comedians, and actors then attempt to fill in the missing blank. After the guests make their guesses, the answer is revealed, and proof is offered to show how the piece of trivia is true.

Following the video evidence, a panel of 50 judges votes on how interesting the particular piece of trivia was, rating it on a scale of one to five stars. For people that submitted items that received five stars, a cash prize of 1,000,000 won is awarded.

However, the new version, Sponge 2.0, has a different format. Instead of viewers submitting items, professionals from specific fields appear on set to provide intriguing and interesting facts, which are presented with video footage. Instead of 50 judges, the show invites 100 people who usually assist in on-stage polls and demonstrations. The panel of celebrities remains.

The original version of Sponge ended with the week's top internet searches on Naver. In Sponge 2.0, episodes end with a way to develop and stimulate the brain.

== Plagiarism accusations ==
Following Sponge's 2003 debut, the Japanese television network Fuji TV accused the show of copying their program Hey! Spring of Trivia, which first broadcast in October 2002. KBS denied the claims, but Fuji TV stood their ground on the two shows' similarity. Fuji TV initially considered taking legal action against KBS, but Fuji TV later stated the claims proved hard to resolve legally. An investigation by the Korea Broadcasting Commission concluded that the accusations lacked evidence.
