= KBS Entertainment Awards =

South Korea Entertainment Awards

- Current: 2024 KBS Entertainment Awards
- Awarded for: Excellence in variety entertainment
- Location: Seoul
- Country: South Korea
- Presented by: Korean Broadcasting System
- First award: 2002
- Final award: 2023
- Website: https://program.kbs.co.kr/2tv/enter/2019kbsentawards

Television/radio coverage
- Network: KBS2, KBS World (Worldwide)
- Runtime: approximately 140 minutes

Korean name
- Hangul: KBS 연예대상
- Hanja: KBS 演藝大賞
- RR: KBS yeonye daesang
- MR: KBS yŏnye taesang

The KBS Entertainment Awards (Korean: KBS 연예대상) is an event held yearly and is sponsored by KBS. The awards ceremony is approximately 140 minutes long and is shown in two parts on KBS2. The ceremony features performances by K-pop artists and music parodies from Gag Concert members. This event is held at the end of each year, except in 2017, the Entertainment Awards were not held due to the KBS Variety Director Strike.

== Award categories ==
- Daesang (Grand Prize)
- Viewer's Choice Program of the Year
- Top Entertainer Award
- Special Merit Award
- Achievement Award

=== Comedy division ===
- Male Newcomer Award
- Female Newcomer Award
- Comedy Show Writer Award
- Excellence Award, Female Comedian
- Excellence Award, Male Comedian
- Top Excellence Award, Male Comedian
- Top Excellence Award, Female Comedian
- Top Excellence Award, Idea Corner, Comedy Program

=== Variety division ===
- Male MC Newcomer Award
- Female MC Newcomer Award
- Variety Show Writer Award
- Best Teamwork
- Excellence Award, Variety Show Male MC
- Excellence Award, Variety Show Female MC
- Excellence Award, Idea Corner, Variety Show
- Top Excellence Award, Variety Show Male MC
- Top Excellence Award, Variety Show Female MC

== History of winners ==
Sources: From 2005 onward.

=== Grand Prize Award (Daesang) ===
Year	Grand Prize (Daesang)		Ref.
Year	Winner(s)	Program	
1st 2002	Shin Dong-yup		
2nd 2003	Park Joon-hyung		
3rd 2004	Lee Hyuk-jae		
4th 2005	Yoo Jae-suk		
5th 2006	Kim Je-dong		
6th 2007	Tak Jae-hoon	Happy Sunday: Immortal Musical Classics	
7th 2008	Kang Ho-dong	Happy Sunday: 1 Night 2 Days	
8th 2009	Kang Ho-dong	Happy Sunday: 1 Night 2 Days	
9th 2010	Lee Kyung-kyu	Happy Sunday: Qualifications of Men	
10th 2011	Lee Soo-geun; Lee Seung-gi; Eun Ji-won; Kim Jong-min; Uhm Tae-woong	Happy Sunday: 1 Night 2 Days	
11th 2012	Shin Dong-yup	Hello Counselor, Immortal Songs 2	
12th 2013	Kim Jun-ho	Gag Concert, The Human Condition, 1 Night 2 Days Season 3	
13th 2014	Yoo Jae-suk	Happy Together, I Am a Man	
14th 2015	Lee Hwi-jae	Happy Sunday: The Return Of Superman, Vitamin	
15th 2016	Kim Jong-min	Happy Sunday: 1 Night 2 Days Season 3	
16th 2018	Lee Young-ja	Hello Counselor	
17th 2019	The Return of Superman Fathers	The Return of Superman	
18th 2020	Kim Sook	Problem Child in House, Boss in the Mirror	
19th 2021	Moon Se-yoon	2 Days & 1 Night 4, Godfather, Trot Magic Wanderer Troupe	
20th 2022	Shin Dong-yup	Immortal Songs: Singing the Legend	
21st 2023	Yeon Jung-hoon; Kim Jong-min; Moon Se-yoon; DinDin; Na In-woo; Yoo Seon-ho	2 Days & 1 Night 4	
22nd 2024	Lee Chan-won	Immortal Song; Stars' Top Recipe at Fun-staurant; Secrets of the Celebrity Soldier; High-End Penny Pincher	
23rd 2025	Jun Hyun-moo	Boss in the Mirror; Crazy Rich Korean	

=== Entertainer of the Year ===
Year	Winner(s)	Program	Ref.
19th 2021	Kim Sook	Boss in the Mirror; Problem Child in House	
19th 2021	Kim Jong-min	1 Night 2 Days	
19th 2021	Moon Se-yoon	1 Night 2 Days; Godfather; Trot Magic Wanderers	
19th 2021	Park Joo-ho family	The Return of Superman	
19th 2021	Jeon Hyun-moo	Boss in the Mirror	
20th 2022	Kim Sook	Boss in the Mirror; Problem Child in House; Beat Coin; Godfather; Baby Singer	
20th 2022	Kim Jong-min	1 Night 2 Days	
20th 2022	Shin Dong-yup	Immortal Songs: Singing the Legend	
20th 2022	Lee Kyung-kyu	Dogs are Incredible	
20th 2022	Jeon Hyun-moo	Boss in the Mirror	
21st 2023	1 Night 2 Days team	1 Night 2 Days	
21st 2023	Kim Sook	Boss in the Mirror; Problem Child in House; Beat Coin	
21st 2023	Ryu Soo-young	Stars' Top Recipe at Fun-Staurant	
21st 2023	J.Y. Park	Golden Girls	
21st 2023	Shin Dong-yup	Immortal Songs: Singing the Legend	
21st 2023	Lee Chun-soo	Mr. House Husband	
21st 2023	Jeon Hyun-moo	Boss in the Mirror	
22nd 2024	Kim Jong-min	1 Night 2 Days	
22nd 2024	Ryu Soo-young	Stars' Top Recipe at Fun-Staurant	
22nd 2024	Yoo Jae-suk	Synchro U	
22nd 2024	Lee Chan-won	Immortal Songs: Singing the Legend; Stars' Top Recipe at Fun-Staurant	
22nd 2024	Jeon Hyun-moo	Boss in the Mirror	
23rd 2025	Kim Sook	Boss in the Mirror; Problem Child in House; Pursuing Old Encounter; Delivery Has Arrive	
23rd 2025	Kim Young-hee	Gag Concert; Malja Show	
23rd 2025	Park Bo-gum	The Seasons: Park Bo-gum's Cantabile, Music Bank World Tour	
23rd 2025	Kim Jong-min	2 Days & 1 Night, The Return of Superman	
23rd 2025	Boom	Stars' Top Recipe at Fun-Staurant; Heart on Wheel	
23rd 2025	Lee Chan-won	Stars' Top Recipe at Fun-Staurant Celebrity Soldier's Secret; Bangpan Music: I'm Going Anywhere	
23rd 2025	Jeon Hyun-moo	Boss in the Mirror; Krazy rich korean	

=== Viewer's Choice Program of the Year ===
The Viewer's Choice Program award is chosen by votes from the viewers by SMS.

Year	Viewer's Choice Program
1st 2002	Happy Together Season 1
2nd 2003	Gag Concert
3rd 2004	Sponge
4th 2005	Sang Sang Plus
5th 2006	Sang Sang Plus
6th 2007	Happy Together Season 3
7th 2008	Happy Sunday
8th 2009	Happy Sunday
9th 2010	Happy Sunday
10th 2011	Gag Concert
11th 2012	Gag Concert
12th 2013	Gag Concert
13th 2014	Happy Sunday: The Return of Superman
14th 2015	Happy Sunday: 2 Days & 1 Night – Season 3
15th 2016	Happy Sunday: 2 Days & 1 Night – Season 3
16th 2018	Happy Sunday: 2 Days & 1 Night – Season 3
17th 2019	The Return of Superman
18th 2020	2 Days & 1 Night – Season 4
19th 2021	2 Days & 1 Night – Season 4
20th 2022	Immortal Songs: Singing the Legend
21st 2023	Immortal Songs: Singing the Legend
22nd 2024	Immortal Songs: Singing the Legend
23rd 2025	Mr. House Husband

=== Top Excellence Award ===
The Top Excellence Award is awarded to an individual for their appearance in variety and comedy. In recent years, a female and male MC/comedian are awarded in each category.

==== 2002 – 2019 ====
Year	Show / Variety		Comedy	
Year	Winner(s)	Program	Winner(s)	Program
1st 2002	Lee Kyung-kyu	Hey! One Night	Kang Sung-beom	Gag Concert: Rambling Man
1st 2002	Lee Kyung-kyu	Hey! One Night	Park Joon-hyung	Gag Concert: Beaver Brothers
1st 2002	Lee Kyung-kyu	Hey! One Night	Park Joon-hyung	Gag Concert: Young Rats
2nd 2003	Yoo Jae-suk	Super Sunday TV is Fun	Jung Yong-cheol	Gag Concert: Bongsunga School
2nd 2003	Yoo Jae-suk	Happy Together Season 1	Jung Yong-cheol	Gag Concert: Survival Dialect
3rd 2004	Lee Hwi-jae	Sponge	Park Seong-ho	Gag Concert: Bongsunga School
4th 2005	Tak Jae-hoon	Sang Sang Plus	Kim Joon-ho	Gag Concert: Family's Love
4th 2005	Tak Jae-hoon	Happy Together Friends	Kim Joon-ho	Gag Concert: Family's Love
5th 2006	Lee Hwi-jae	Sang Sang Plus	Jeong Jong-chul	Gag Concert: Mappagi
5th 2006	Lee Hwi-jae	Sponge	Jeong Jong-chul	Gag Concert: Mappagi
6th 2007	Nam Hee-seok	Global Talk Show	Kim Dae-hee	Gag Concert: We Need Communication
6th 2007	Hyun Young	Happy Sunday: Heroine 6	Kim Dae-hee	Gag Concert: We Need Communication
7th 2008	Jung Eun-ah	Vitamin	Kim Byung-man	Gag Concert: Master Show
8th 2009	Park Mi-sun	Comedy Star	Park Seong-ho	Gag Concert: Affectionate Man's Rights Committee
8th 2009	Park Mi-sun	Happy Together Season 3	Park Seong-ho	Gag Concert: Affectionate Man's Rights Committee
9th 2010	Hwang Soo-kyung	Open Concert	Park Ji-sun	Gag Concert: Solo Heaven Couple Hell
9th 2010	Hwang Soo-kyung	Open Concert	Park Ji-sun	Gag Concert: Buahjok
9th 2010	Lee Seung-gi	Happy Sunday: 1 Night 2 Days	Kim Byung-man	Gag Concert: Master Show
10th 2011	Lee Young-ja		Jeong Kyung-mi	
10th 2011	Lee Soo-geun		Kim Joon-ho	
11th 2012	Lee Young-ja	Hello Counselor	Shin Bo-ra	Gag Concert: Discoveries in Life, Brave Guys
11th 2012	Lee Young-ja	Invincible Youth Season 2	Shin Bo-ra	Gag Concert: Discoveries in Life, Brave Guys
11th 2012	Kim Seung-woo	Win Win	Kim Jun-hyun	Gag Concert: Discoveries in Life, Four Men
11th 2012	Kim Seung-woo	Happy Sunday: 1 Night 2 Days – Season 2	Kim Jun-hyun	Gag Concert: Discoveries in Life, Four Men
12th 2013	Park Mi-sun	Mamma Mia, Happy Together Season 3	Kim Ji-min	Gag Concert: BBOOM Entertainment
12th 2013	Cha Tae-hyun	Happy Sunday: 2 Days & 1 Night – Season 2 and 3	Kim Jun-hyun	Gag Concert: Just Relax, Goosebumps
13th 2014	Kim Ji-min	Crisis Escape No. 1 Human Condition	Kim Young-hee	Gag Concert
13th 2014	Choo Sung-hoon	Happy Sunday: The Return of Superman	Kim Dae-hee	Gag Concert
14th 2015	Park Myeong-su	Happy Together Season 3 A Look At Myself	Kim Min-kyung	Gag Concert
14th 2015	Kim Jong-min	Happy Sunday: 2 Days & 1 Night – Season 3	Yoo Min-sang	Gag Concert
15th 2016	Kim Sook	Sister's Slam Dunk, Battle Trip	Lee Su-ji	Gag Concert
15th 2016	Ra Mi-ran	Sister's Slam Dunk	Lee Su-ji	Gag Concert
15th 2016	Jung Jae-hyung	Immortal Songs: Singing the Legend	Yoo Min-sang	Gag Concert
15th 2016	Lee Dong-gook	Happy Sunday: The Return of Superman	Yoo Min-sang	Gag Concert
16th 2018	Defconn	Happy Sunday: 2 Days & 1 Night – Season 3	Shin Bong-sun	Gag Concert
16th 2018	Sam Hammington	Happy Sunday: The Return of Superman'	Shin Bong-sun	Gag Concert
16th 2018	Kim Sook	Battle Trip	Kwon Jae-kwan	Gag Concert
16th 2018	Moon Hee-joon	Immortal Songs: Singing the Legend	Kwon Jae-kwan	Gag Concert
17th 2019	Kim Seung-hyun	Mr. House Husband 2	Park Joon-hyung	Gag Concert: Everyday Dialect, Bababa Brothers

==== 2020 – present ====
Year	Show/Variety		Reality	
Year	Winner(s)	Program	Winner(s)	Program
18th 2020	Moon Se-yoon	2 Day & 1 Night 4		
18th 2020	Moon Se-yoon	2 Day & 1 Night 4	Poppin' Hyun Joon; Park Ye-ri	Mr. House Husband 2 Immortal Songs: Singing the Legend
18th 2020	Moon Se-yoon	2 Day & 1 Night 4	Hyun Joo-yup	Boss in the Mirror
19th 2021	Jang Yoon-jeong	I Like to Sing, LAN Marketplace, The Return of Superman	Hur Jae	Godfather, Boss in the Mirror
20th 2022	Ryu Soo-young	Stars' Top Recipe at Fun-staurant	Lee Chun-soo	Mr. House Husband
20th 2022	DinDin	2 Day & 1 Night 4	Sayuri Fujita	The Return of Superman
21st 2023	Kim Jun-hyun	Immortal Songs: Singing the Legend	Lee Chan-won	Stars' Top Recipe at Fun-Staurant
21st 2023	Hong Jin-kyung	Beat Coin	Jasson	The Return of Superman
22nd 2024	Shin Yun-seung	Gag Concert	Kim Jun-ho	The Return of Superman
22nd 2024	Jo Se-ho	2 Day & 1 Night 4	Jang Minho	Stars' Top Recipe at Fun-Staurant
23rd 2025	Lee Joon	2 Day & 1 Night 4	Lee Jung-hyun	Stars' Top Recipe at Fun-Staurant
23rd 2025	Song Eun-i	Problem Child in House	Park Seo-jin	Mr. House Husband

=== Excellence Award ===
The Excellence award is awarded to an individual for their appearance in variety and comedy. In recent years, a female and male MC/comedian are awarded in each category.

==== 2002 – 2019 ====
Year	Variety		Comedy	
Year	Winner(s)	Program	Winner(s)	Program
2nd 2003	Yoon Do-hyun	Yoon Do Hyun's Love Letter	Im Hyeok-pil	Gag Concert: Bongsunga School
3rd 2004	Ji Suk-jin	Happy Sunday	Jeong Hyeong-don	Gag Concert: Beautiful Flowers
4th 2005	Kim Je-dong	Happy Sunday: I'm Going To See	Jang Dong-min; Kim Hyun-sook	Gag Concert: Bongsunga School
5th 2006	Hyun Young; Jung Sun-hee	Happy Sunday: Heroine 6	Kang Yu-mi	Gag Concert: Love Counselor
5th 2006	Hyun Young; Jung Sun-hee	Happy Sunday: Heroine 6	Kim Dae-beom	Gag Concert: Mappagi
6th 2007	Park Ji-yoon	Star Golden Bell	Byun Ki-soo	Gag Concert: Fussy Mr. Byeon
6th 2007	Ji Suk-jin	Star Golden Bell	Shin Bong-sun	Gag Concert: We Need Communication
6th 2007	Ji Suk-jin	Happy Sunday: High Five	Shin Bong-sun	Gag Concert: We Need Communication
7th 2008	Shin Bong-sun	Champagne	Park Ji-sun	Gag Concert: Bongsunga School
7th 2008	Shin Bong-sun	Happy Together Season 3	Hwang Hyun-hee	Gag Concert: Hwang Hyun-hee's Consumer Reports
8th 2009	Shin Bong-sun	Champagne	Kang Yumi	Gag Concert: Teacher Kang's Dressing Room
8th 2009	Shin Bong-sun	Happy Together Season 3	Ahn Young-mi	Gag Concert: Teacher Kang's Dressing Room
8th 2009	Lee Soo-geun	Sang Sang Plus	Yoon Hyung-bin	Gag Concert: Bongsunga School
8th 2009	Lee Soo-geun	Happy Sunday: 1 Night 2 Days	Yoon Hyung-bin	Gag Concert: Bongsunga School
9th 2010	Goo Hara	Invincible Youth	Heo Anna	Gag Concert: Superstar KBS
9th 2010	Lee Soo-geun	Happy Sunday: 1 Night 2 Days	Park Young-jin	Gag Concert: Double Debate
10th 2011	Kim Kyung-ran		Shin Bo-ra	
10th 2011	Kim Seung-woo	Win Win	Kim Won-hyo	
10th 2011	Kim Seung-woo	Win Win	Choi Hyo-jong	
11th 2012	Hwang Shin-hye	Family	Kim Ji-min	Gag Concert: The Uncomfortable Truth, Dignity of a Beggar
11th 2012	Jung Chan-woo; Kim Tae-kyun	Hello Counselor	Heo Kyung-hwan	Gag Concert: Dignity of a Beggar, Four Men
11th 2012	Jung Chan-woo; Kim Tae-kyun	Hello Counselor	Jung Tae-ho	Gag Concert: Brave Guys, Madam Jeong
12th 2013	Park Eun-young	Entertainment Weekly, Mamma Mia, Vitamin	Kim Min-kyung	Gag Concert: Lobbyist, BBOOM Entertainment, Angels
12th 2013	Jung Chan-woo; Kim Tae-kyun	Hello Counselor	Yoo Min-sang	Gag Concert: Forever Alone, Legends of Legends, ....., You Are So Bad
13th 2014	Kim Shin-young	Happy Together, Human Condition	Heo An-na	Gag Concert
13th 2014	Defconn	Happy Sunday: 2 Days & 1 Night – Season 3	Jo Yoon-ho	Gag Concert
14th 2015	Kim Soo-mi	A Look At Myself	Lee Su-ji	Gag Concert
14th 2015	Song Il-gook	Happy Sunday: The Return of Superman	Lee Sang-hoon	Gag Concert
15th 2016	Jun Hyun-moo	Happy Together Season 3	Lee Hyun-jung	Gag Concert
15th 2016	Ki Tae-young; Lee Beom-soo	Happy Sunday: The Return of Superman	Song Young-gil	Gag Concert
16th 2018	Ko Ji-yong	Happy Sunday: The Return of Superman	Park So-ra	Gag Concert
16th 2018	Kim Seung-hyun	Mr. House Husband Season 2	Park So-ra	Gag Concert
16th 2018	Sung Si-kyung	Battle Trip	Song Joon-geun	Gag Concert
16th 2018	Jo Se-ho	Happy Together	Song Joon-geun	Gag Concert
17th 2019	Do Kyung-wan	The Return of Superman, I Like Songs	Seo Tae-hoon	Gag Concert: Trot Drama, Hidden Voice
17th 2019	Kim Tae-woo	Immortal Songs: Singing the Legend	Seo Tae-hoon	Gag Concert: Trot Drama, Hidden Voice
Year	Winner(s)	Program	Winner(s)	Program
Year	Variety		Comedy	

==== 2020 – present ====
Year	Show/Variety		Reality	
Year	Winner(s)	Program	Winner(s)	Program
18th 2020	DinDin	2 Days & 1 Night 4	Lee Yoo-ri	Stars' Top Recipe at Fun-Staurant
19th 2021	Yeon Jung-hoon	2 Days & 1 Night 4	Jang Minho	Godfather
19th 2021	Lee Seung-yoon	Gag Fighter	Oh Yoon-ah	Stars' Top Recipe at Fun-Staurant
20th 2022	Kim Shin-young	Korea Sings	Kim Byung-hyun	Boss in the Mirror
20th 2022	Lee Chan-won	Immortal Songs: Singing the Legend; Stars' Top Recipe at Fun-Staurant	Jasson	The Return of Superman
21st 2023	Choi Jung-hoon	The Black Box on Earth	Kim Jun-ho	The Return of Superman
21st 2023	Joo Woo-jae	Beat Coin	Kim Jun-ho	The Return of Superman
22nd 2024	Lee Joon	2 Days & 1 Night 4	Park Soo-hong	The Return of Superman
22nd 2024	Lee Young-ji	The Seasons	Jung Ji-Sung	Boss in the Mirror
23rd 2025	Yoo Seon-ho	2 Days & 1 Night 4	Kim Jae-joong	Stars' Top Recipe at Fun-Staurant
23rd 2025	Joo Woo-jae	Problem Child in House	Ji Sang-ryeol	Pursuing Old Encounter

=== Best Newcomer Award ===
In recent years, a rookie female and male MC/comedian are awarded in each category.

==== 2002 – 2019 ====
Year	Variety		Comedy	
Year	Winner(s)	Program	Winner(s)	Program
1st 2002	Lee Hyori		Lee Jung-soo	
1st 2002	Jang Na-ra		Lee Jung-soo	
2nd 2003	Kang Soo-jung	Happy Sunday: Heroine 5	Jeong Hyeong-don	
2nd 2003	Kang Soo-jung	Happy Sunday: Heroine 5	Seo Nam-yong	
2nd 2003	Kim Je-dong		Kwon Jin-young	
2nd 2003	Kim Je-dong		Kim Da-rae	
3rd 2004	Kim Kyung-ran		Kang Yumi	
3rd 2004	Kim Hyun-wook		Ahn Sang-tae	
3rd 2004	Kim Hyun-wook		Jung Chul-gyu	
4th 2005	Noh Hyun-jung		Yoo Se-yoon	
4th 2005	Noh Hyun-jung		Park Hwi-soon	
4th 2005	Noh Hyun-jung		Ahn Young-mi	
4th 2005	Noh Hyun-jung		Shin Bong-sun	
5th 2006	Park Ji-yoon		Ahn Il-kwon	
5th 2006	Park Ji-yoon		Kim Ji-min	Gag Concert: Lovers
6th 2007	Han Seok-joon		Kim Won-hyo	
6th 2007	Choi Song-hyun	Sang Sang Plus	Park Ji-sun	
7th 2008	Lee Ji-ae		Kim Kyung-ah	
7th 2008	Lee Soo-geun		Park Sung-gwang	
8th 2009	Kim Shin-young		Oh Nami	Gag Concert: Poisonous Things
8th 2009	Jun Hyun-moo		Heo Kyung-hwan	Gag Concert: Bongsungah School
9th 2010	Lee Si-young	Entertainment Weekly	Kim Young-hee	
9th 2010	Kim Seung-woo	Win Win	Choi Hyo-jong	
10th 2011	Park Eun-young		Lee Hee-kyung	
10th 2011	Yang Joon-hyuk	Happy Sunday: Qualifications of Men	Jung Tae-ho	
11th 2012	Bae Suzy	Invincible Youth Season 2	Park So-young	Gag Concert: School of Mental Breakdown
11th 2012	Joo Won	Happy Sunday: 1 Night 2 Days – Season 2	Kim Kiri	Gag Concert: Discoveries in Life, The Uncomfortable Truth
11th 2012	Joo Sang-wook	Happy Sunday: Qualifications of Men	Kim Kiri	Gag Concert: Discoveries in Life, The Uncomfortable Truth
12th 2013	Bora	Music Bank	An Somi	Gag Concert: The Three Friends, Dance Chatter
12th 2013	John Park	Cool Kiz on the Block	Lee Mun-jae	Gag Concert: Badump Badump, You Are So Bad
13th 2014	Cha Yu-ram	Cool Kiz on the Block	Lee Soo-ji	Gag Concert
13th 2014	Kim Joo-hyuk	Happy Sunday: 2 Days & 1 Night – Season 3	Song Pil-geun	Gag Concert
14th 2015	Seol-hyun	Brave Family	Lee Hyun-jung	Gag Concert
14th 2015	Park Bo-gum	Music Bank	Lee Sae-jin	Gag Concert
14th 2015	Lee Jae-yoon	Cool Kiz on the Block	Lee Sae-jin	Gag Concert
15th 2016	Min Hyo-rin	Sister's Slam Dunk	Kim Seung-hye	Gag Concert
15th 2016	Uhm Hyun-kyung	Happy Together Season 3	Kim Seung-hye	Gag Concert
15th 2016	Yoon Shi-yoon	Happy Sunday: 2 Days & 1 Night – Season 3	Hong Hyun-ho	Gag Concert
15th 2016	Choi Tae-joon	Hello Counselor	Hong Hyun-ho	Gag Concert
16th 2018	Honey Lee	The Secret and Great Private Lives of Animals	Kim Ni-na	Gag Concert
16th 2018	Eric Nam	Samcheong-dong's Foreign Grandmother	Kim Ni-na	Gag Concert
16th 2018	Kei (Lovelyz)	Music Bank	Lee Seung-hwan	Gag Concert
16th 2018	Choi Won-myung	Music Bank	Lee Seung-hwan	Gag Concert
17th 2019	Jung Il-woo		Bae-jeong-geun	Gag Concert
17th 2019	Sim Yeong-soon		Bae-jeong-geun	Gag Concert

==== 2020 – present ====
Year	Show/Variety		Reality	
Year	Winner(s)	Program	Winner(s)	Program
18th 2020	Kim Seon-ho	2 Days & 1 Night 4	Kim Il-woo	Mr. House Husband 2
18th 2020	Kim Seon-ho	2 Days & 1 Night 4	Kim Jae-won	Stars' Top Recipe at Fun-Staurant
19th 2021	Ravi	2 Days & 1 Night 4	Hong Sung-heon	Mr. House Husband 2
20th 2022	Na In-woo	2 Days & 1 Night 4	Yang Se-hyung	Love Recall
20th 2022	Na In-woo	2 Days & 1 Night 4	Jung Tae-woo	Mr. House Husband 2
21st 2023	Golden Girls team	Golden Girls	Jin Seo-yeon	Stars' Top Recipe at Fun-Staurant
21st 2023	Yoo Seon-ho	2 Days & 1 Night 4	Jung Ji-Sung	Boss in the Mirror
22nd 2024	Zico	The Seasons	Park Seo-jin	Mr. House Husband 2
22nd 2024	Karina	Synchro U	Lee Sang-woo	Stars' Top Recipe at Fun-Staurant
23rd 2025	10cm	The Seasons	Shim Hyung-tak; Shim Haru	The Return of Superman
23rd 2025	Na Hyun-young	Gag Concert	Kim Kang-woo	Stars' Top Recipe at Fun-Staurant

=== Top Entertainer Award ===
From 2002 to 2007, the award was called "Best Entertainer Award" (Korean: 베스트 엔터테이너상). In 2008, it was renamed to "Top Popularity Award" (Korean: 최고 인기상). From 2009 to 2019, the award was called "Top Entertainer Award" (Korean: 최고 엔터테이너상). From 2020, the award was renamed back as "Best Entertainer Award" (Korean: 베스트 엔터테이너상).

==== 2002 – 2019 ====
Year	Variety	
Year	Winner(s)	Program
1st 2002	Kang Byung-kyu	자유선언 토요대작전
1st 2002	Lee Hyuk-jae	자유선언 토요대작전
2nd 2003	–	
3rd 2004	Jung Sun-hee	Happy Sunday: Heroine 6
4th 2005	Noh Joo-hyun	Vitamin
4th 2005	Kim Jong-kook	Happy Sunday: Shooting Kid
5th 2006	Kim Jong-min	Happy Sunday: Heroine 6
6th 2007	Kim Gu-ra	Star Golden Bell
6th 2007	Lee Soo-geun	Happy Sunday: 1 Night 2 Days
6th 2007	Kim Sung-eun	Happy Sunday: Immortal Musical Classics
7th 2008	Lee Seung-gi	Happy Sunday: 1 Night 2 Days
8th 2009	Kim Sung-min	Qualifications of Men
8th 2009	Kim Tae-won	Qualifications of Men
8th 2009	Lee Ha-neul	Invincible Baseball Team
9th 2010	Eun Ji-won	Happy Sunday: 1 Night 2 Days
9th 2010	Eun Ji-won	Crisis Escape No. 1
9th 2010	Park Myeong-su	Happy Together Season 3
9th 2010	Park Myeong-su	100 Out of 100
10th 2011	Uhm Tae-woong	Happy Sunday: 1 Night 2 Days
10th 2011	Jun Hyun-moo	Happy Sunday: Qualifications of Men
11th 2012	Shin Hyun-joon (Infotainment category)	Entertainment Weekly
11th 2012	You Hee-yeol (Music show category)	You Hee-yeol's Sketchbook
11th 2012	Cha Tae-hyun (Variety show category)	Happy Sunday: 1 Night 2 Days – Season 2
12th 2013	Max Changmin (Variety show category)	Cool Kiz on the Block
12th 2013	Choo Sung-hoon (Variety show category)	The Return of Superman
12th 2013	Kim Jong-kook (Infotainment category)	Crisis Escape No. 1
12th 2013	Moon Hee-joon (Infotainment category)	Immortal Songs 2
13th 2014	Jeong Hyeong-don (Variety show category)	Cool Kiz on the Block
13th 2014	Jung Joon-young (Variety show category)	Happy Sunday: 2 Days & 1 Night – Season 3
13th 2014	Jo Woo-jong (Entertainment category)	
14th 2015	Hong Kyung-min (Variety show category)	Immortal Songs 2
14th 2015	Shin Hyun-joon (Infotainment category)	Entertainment Weekly
14th 2015	Lee Dong-gook (Entertainment category)	Happy Sunday: The Return of Superman
14th 2015	Kim Joo-hyuk (Entertainment category)	Happy Sunday: 2 Days & 1 Night – Season 3
15th 2016	Namkoong Min (Variety show category)	Singing Battle
16th 2018	Yoon Shi-yoon	Happy Sunday: 2 Days & 1 Night – Season 3
16th 2018	Choi Yang-rak	Mr. House Husband Season 2
16th 2018	Paeng Hyun-sook	Mr. House Husband Season 2
16th 2018	Kim Tae-jin	Entertainment Weekly

==== 2020 – present ====
Year	Show/Variety		Reality	
Year	Winner(s)	Program	Winner(s)	Program
18th 2020	Hong Kyung-min	Trot National Festival and The Return of Superman	Yang Chi-seung	Boss in the Mirror
18th 2020	Yeon Jung-hoon	2 Days & 1 Night 4	Oh Yoon-ah	Stars' Top Recipe at Fun-Staurant
18th 2020	Seunghee	Not Soccer or Baseball	Ryu Soo-young	Stars' Top Recipe at Fun-Staurant
19th 2021	Solar	Boss in the Mirror, The Song We Loved, New Singer	Kim Byung-hyun	Boss in the Mirror
19th 2021	Jang Do-yeon	Dogs Are Incredible	Sayuri Fujita	The Return of Superman
19th 2021	Hong Hyun-hee	LAN Marketplace	Sayuri Fujita	The Return of Superman
20th 2022	Yeon Jung-hoon	2 Days & 1 Night 4	Cha Ye-ryun	Stars' Top Recipe at Fun-Staurant
20th 2022	Yeon Jung-hoon	2 Days & 1 Night 4	Park Joo-ho	The Return of Superman
21st 2023			Kang Daniel	Mr. House Husband
22nd 2024	Moon Se-yoon	2 Days & 1 Night 4	Lee Juck	Shyncro U
23rd 2025	Moon Se-yoon	2 Days & 1 Night 4	Eun Ji-won	Mr. House Husband
23rd 2025	Hong Jin-kyung	Problem Child in House	Kim Jae-won	Heart on Wheels

=== Top Excellence Award, Idea (Corner) ===
For eleven years, Gag Concert has won a Top Excellence Award for Idea (Corner).

Year	Program	Corner
1st 2002	Gag Concert	Survival Dialect
2nd 2003	Gag Concert	Doremi Trio
2nd 2003	Happy Together	Karaoke Tree
2nd 2003	Campaign for a Nice Country	최재원의 양심추적
3rd 2004	Gag Concert	Flash Shopping
3rd 2004	Sponge	Sponge Response
3rd 2004	Morning Forum	The Person I Miss
4th 2005	Gag Concert	Family's Love
4th 2005	Sang Sang Plus	Old and New Three Empathy
5th 2006	Gag Concert	Mappagi
5th 2006	Happy Sunday	Shooting Kid
6th 2007	Gag Concert	We Need Communication
6th 2007	Happy Sunday	1 Night 2 Days
7th 2008	Gag Concert	The Master Show
8th 2009	Gag Concert	Teacher Kang's Dressing Room
9th 2010	Gag Concert	Double Debate
10th 2011	Gag Concert	Solutions to Iffy Issues
11th 2012	Gag Concert	Brave Guys
12th 2013	Gag Concert	The Yellow Sea
13th 2014	Gag Concert	Late Love
14th 2015	Gag Concert	Min Sang Debate
15th 2016	Gag Concert	The Most Sensitive People
16th 2018	Gag Concert	Refreshing Statements
17th 2019	Gag Concert	Weekly Park Sung-kwang
The award was not presented for three consecutive years.
21st 2023	Gag Concert	How about Defcon?
22nd 2024	Gag Concert	Simgok Police Station
23rd 2025	Gag Concert	Chatflix

=== Excellence Award, Idea (Corner) ===
Year	Program	Corner
4th 2005	Fun Club	X-Files: Dry Human Research
4th 2005	Happy Sunday	I'm Going To See
5th 2006	Gag Concert	High Pitch Impossible
5th 2006	Vitamin	Great Folks
6th 2007	Gag Concert	Fussy Mr. Byun
6th 2007	Happy Sunday	Immortal Musical Classics

=== Writer Award ===
==== 2002 – 2019 ====
Year	Variety		Comedy	
Year	Winner(s)	Program	Winner(s)	Program
4th 2005	Moon Eun-ae	SangSang Plus; Crisis Escape No. 1	Kim Eun-mi	Gag Concert
4th 2005	Shin Yeo-jin	Happy Together; Introduce Me to a Good Person	Kim Eun-mi	Gag Concert
5th 2006	Lee Hyun-ju	Vitamin	Hong Yoon-hye	Gag Concert
6th 2007	Im Gi-hong	Entertainment Weekly	Lee Nam-kyu	Gag Concert
7th 2008	Lee Woo-jung	Happy Sunday: 1 Night 2 Days	Kang Yoon-mi	Gag Concert
8th 2009	Jeong Han-wook	National Singing Contest	Baek Seong-woon	Gag Concert
9th 2010	Lee Don-kyung	Love Request	Lee Sang-deok	Gag Concert
10th 2011	Mo Eun-seol	Win Win	Choi Dae-woong	Gag Star 2
10th 2011	Joo Ji-peum	Happy Together Season 3	Choi Dae-woong	Gag Star 2
11th 2012	Choi Jae-hyung	Happy Sunday: 1 Night 2 Days – Season 2	Jo Ye-hyun	Gag Concert: Uncomfortable Truth
12th 2013	Lee Hyun-sook	Entertainment Weekly	Lee Sang-deok	Gag Concert
14th 2015	Lee Sang-joon	I Am Korea, Open Concert	Choi Sang-hee	Gag Concert
15th 2016	Ji Hyun Sook	Sister's Slam Dunk	Yoon Ki Young	Gag Concert
15th 2016	Jung Sun Young	Happy Sunday: 1 Night 2 Days – Season 3	Yoon Ki Young	Gag Concert
16th 2018	Shim Eun-ha	Mr. House Husband Season 2	Jang Jong-won	Gag Concert
16th 2018	Moon Eun-ae	Hello Counselor	Jang Jong-won	Gag Concert
16th 2018	Park Jae-eun	Hello Counselor	Jang Jong-won	Gag Concert
16th 2018	Lee Do-ri	Hello Counselor	Jang Jong-won	Gag Concert
16th 2018	Park Da-hye	Hello Counselor	Jang Jong-won	Gag Concert
16th 2018	Lee Eun-joo	Hello Counselor	Jang Jong-won	Gag Concert
16th 2018	Jang Hye-young	Hello Counselor	Jang Jong-won	Gag Concert
16th 2018	Kim Ji-yoon	Hello Counselor	Jang Jong-won	Gag Concert
17th 2019	Beak Sun-young	The Return of Superman, Stars' Top Recipe at Fun-Staurant	—	—

==== 2020 – present ====
Year	Variety	
Year	Winner(s)	Program
18th 2020	Kim Ji-eun	Trot National Festival, I Like Songs, Immortal Songs, Korea Again Na Hoon-a
19th 2021	Noh Jin-young	2 Days & 1 Night 4
20th 2022	Kwon Yu-kyung	Mr. House Husband; The Return of Superman
21st 2023	Yang Young-mi	Open Concert
21st 2023	Choi Hye-ran	2 Days & 1 Night 4
22nd 2024	Seo Hyun-ah	The Seasons
22nd 2024	Lee Min-ju	Mr. House Husband
23rd 2025	Lee Hae-nim	Stars' Top Recipe at Fun-Staurant
23rd 2025	Myung Min-ah	Boss in the Mirror

=== Best Teamwork Award ===
Year	Variety
8th 2009	Invincible Baseball Team
9th 2010	Happy Together Season 3
10th 2011	Hello Counselor
11th 2012	Happy Sunday: Qualifications of Men
12th 2013	Cool Kiz on the Block
13th 2014	Immortal Songs 2
14th 2015	Cool Kiz on the Block
15th 2016	Happy Together Season 3
16th 2018	Hello Counselor
17th 2019	Happy Together Season 4
18th 2020	Entertainment Weekly Live
19th 2021	Mr. House Husband 2
20th 2022	Beat Coin; Love Recall
21st 2023	Gag Concert
22nd 2024	2 Days & 1 Night 4
23rd 2025	Gag Concert

=== Radio DJ Award ===
Year	Radio DJ of the Year		New Radio DJ of the Year	
Year	Winner(s)	Program	Winner(s)	Program
1st 2002	Kangta; Shin Hye-sung	Kangta, Shin Hye-sung 'Freedom Declaration'	—N/a	
2nd 2003	Tae Jin-ah	Show Show Show	—N/a	
3rd 2004	Danny Ahn	Kiss the Radio	—N/a	
3rd 2004	Wang Young-eun; Jung Han-yong	Hello! this is Jung Han yong and Wang Young-eun	—N/a	
The award was not presented for 3 consecutive years.
6th 2007	Cha Tae-hyun	Mr. Radio	—N/a	
6th 2007	Ahn Jae-wook	Mr. Radio	—N/a	
9th 2010	You Hee-yeol	Radio Heaven	—N/a	
10th 2011	Tae Jin-ah	Show Show Show	—N/a	
10th 2011	Hwang Jung-min	FM Parade	—N/a	
11th 2012	Lee Hyun-woo	Music Album	—N/a	
12th 2013	Jang Yoon-ju	Rooftop Radio	—N/a	
13th 2014	Yoo In-na	Let's Crank Up the Volume	—N/a	
14th 2015	Kim Ryeo Wook	Kiss The Radio	—N/a	
15th 2016	Park Myung-soo	KBS Cool FM	—N/a	
16th 2018	Park Eun-young	FM March	Yangpa	Yangpa's Music Garden
16th 2018	Jang Hang-jun	Mr. Radio	Lee Su-hyun	AKMU Su-hyeon's Volume Up
16th 2018	Kim Jin-soo (actor)	Mr. Radio	Lee Su-hyun	AKMU Su-hyeon's Volume Up
17th 2019	Lee Geum-hee	사랑하기 좋은 날 이금희입니다	Jung Eun-ji	Jung Eun-ji Gayo Plaza
18th 2020	Jo Woo-jong	Jo Woo-jong's FM March	Kang Han-na	Kang Han-na's Volume Up
19th 2021	Park Myung-soo	Park Myung-soo's Radio Show	Yoon Jung-soo	Mr. Radio
19th 2021	Park Myung-soo	Park Myung-soo's Radio Show	Nam Chang-hee	Mr. Radio
20th 2022	Lee Gi-kwang	Gikwang's Song Plaza	—N/a	
20th 2022	Lee Min-hyuk	Kiss the Radiol	—N/a	
21st 2023	Young K	Kiss the Radio	—N/a	
21st 2023	Lee Eun-ji	Lee Eun-ji's Music Plaza	—N/a	
22nd 2024	Jo Jeong-sik	Jo Jeong-sik's FM March	—N/a	
22nd 2024	Lee Gak-kyeong	Happy Time 4 O'clock	—N/a	
23rd 2025	Hyojung	Raise the Volume	—N/a	
23rd 2025	Eun Ga-eun	Eun Ga-eun's Shining Trot	—N/a	

=== Special Merit / Achievement Award ===
Year	Special Merit		Achievement	
Year	Recipient(s)	Program	Recipient(s)	Program
4th 2005	Park Bong-joo	Vitamin	Shin Goo	The Clinic for Married Couples: Love and War
4th 2005	Kim Han-jo	Vitamin	Jung Ae-ri	The Clinic for Married Couples: Love and War
4th 2005	Kim Han-jo	Vitamin	Kim Young-ok	Old Miss Diary
5th 2006	Kim Ki-bong	–	Heo Cham	–
5th 2006	Yoo Jae-suk	–	Han Young-shil	–
6th 2007	Global Talk Show Team		Kim In-yeob	–
6th 2007	Global Talk Show Team		Son Young-soo	–
7th 2008	Bae Cheol-soo	Gag Concert 7080	Moon Geum-ju	–
8th 2009	Kwon Oh-joong	Vitamin	Go Dong-wook	–
9th 2010	Kolleen Park	Happy Sunday: Qualifications of Men	Jun Kwang-ryul	–
10th 2011	Kim Tae-won	Happy Sunday: Qualifications of Men	Kang Chan-hee (cameraman)	Happy Sunday: 1 Night 2 Days
11th 2012	Kim Young-ho (head of editing)	–	Kim In-hyeob (bandmaster)	National Singing Contest
12th 2013	Kang Seung-won	You Hee-yeol's Sketchbook	Jang Byeong-min	Open Concert
13th 2014	Song Tae-ho	Concert 7080	Park Young-hyun (technical director)	–
14th 2015	Jo Tae-jun (Cameraman)	–	The late Producer Jin Pil Hong	–
16th 2018	Kim Young-seon (Photographing Director)	–	Bae Cheol-soo	Concert 7080
17th 2019	Kim Seung-jun	–	Shin Hyun-joon	Entertainment Weekly
18th 2020	Ha Dong-geum; Ja Ji-won	-	-	-
19th 2021	Kim Soo-ae	–	Choi Soo-jong & Ha Hee-ra	Mr. House Husband 2
20th 2022	Min Ji-hong	-	The late Song Hae	National Singing Contest
21st 2023	Nam Byeong-guk	-	Kim Dong-geon	Gayo Stage
22nd 2024	MC Bae	-	-	-
23rd 2025	Kim Jung-hyun	-	The late Jeon Yu-seong	Gag Concert

=== Producers' Special Award ===
Year	Winner(s)	Program
9th 2010	Kim Sang-min	Entertainment Weekly
10th 2011	Lee Chang-myung	Let's Go Dream Team! Season 2
12th 2013	Lee Hwi-jae	The Return of Superman
13th 2014	Song Il-kook	The Return of Superman
13th 2014	Lee Hwi-jae	The Return of Superman
14th 2015	Choi Bool-am	Korean Table
15th 2016	Park Jin-young	Sister's Slam Dunk
16th 2018	Shin Hyun-Joon	Entertainment Weekly
17th 2019	Shin Dong-yup	Immortal Songs: Singing the Legend, Hello Counselor
18th 2020	Lee Young-ja	Stars' Top Recipe at Fun-Staurant
18th 2020	Song Eun-i	Problem Child in House
19th 2021	Kang Hyun-wook	Dogs Are Incredible
20th 2022	Heo Jae	Boss in the Mirror
21st 2023	Boom	Stars' Top Recipe at Fun-Staurant
22nd 2024	Kim Jong-min	2 Days & 1 Night
23rd 2025	Nam Hee-suk	National Singing Contest
23rd 2025	Um Ji-in	Boss in the Mirror

=== Best Couple Award ===
Year	Winner(s)	Program
15th 2016	Lee Kwang-soo and Jung So-min	The Sound of Your Heart
16th 2018	Kim Joon-ho and Kim Jong-min	2 Days 1 Night Season 3
16th 2018	Kim Eon-joong and Baek Ok-ja (Kim Seung-hyun's parents)	Mr. House Husband Season 2
17th 2019	Lee Kyung-kyu and Lee Young-ja	Stars' Top Recipe at Fun-Staurant
17th 2019	Shin Ye-eun and Choi Bo-min	Music Bank
18th 2020	Choi Yang-rak and Peng Hyun-sook	Mr. House Husband 2
18th 2020	Kim Ye-rin and Yoon Joo-Man	Mr. House Husband 2
18th 2020	Soobin and Arin	Music Bank
19th 2021	Lee Hwi-jae and Lee Hyun-joo	Entertainment Company Plus
19th 2021	Park Sung-hoon and Jang Won-young	Music Bank
20th 2022	Joo Sang-wook and Jo Jae-yoon	Second House
20th 2022	Ryan Jhun and Kim Seung-soo	Listen-Up
20th 2022	Jo Se-ho and Joo Woo-jae	Beat Coin
20th 2022	Kim Sook and Jonathan	Godfather
21st 2023	Lee Chae-min and Hong Eun-chae	Music Bank
21st 2023	Joon Park and kim Ji-hye	Mr. House Husband
22nd 2024	Moon Sang-min and Minju	Music Bank
22nd 2024	Eun Ji-won and Baek Ji-young	Mr. House Husband
22nd 2024	Jung Tae-ho and Nam Hyun-seung	Gag Concert

=== Other awards ===
==== 2005 – 2019 ====
Year	Award	Winner(s)
4th 2005	Netizen Popularity Award	Ji Hyun-woo, Ye Ji-won (Old Miss Diary)
4th 2005	Best Music Program Award	Yoon Do-hyun's Love Letter
6th 2007	Special Feature Award	National Singing Contest: New York episode
11th 2012	Best Cameo	Bae Suzy (Gag Concert)
12th 2013	Special Program Award	Golden Oldies Germany Concert
12th 2013	Mobile TV Popularity Award	The Children of The Return of Superman
12th 2013	Experimental Attitude Award	The Human Condition
12th 2013	Break Time Award Show (Kind to Rookie Award)	Kang Ho-dong (Cool Kiz on the Block)
12th 2013	Break Time Award Show (Best Eater Award)	Yoo Jae-suk (Happy Together Season 3)
12th 2013	Break Time Award Show (Catchphrase Award)	Jo Dal-hwan (Cool Kiz on the Block)
15th 2016	Popularity Award	The Children of The Return of Superman
15th 2016	Hot Issue Variety Award	Lee Kwang-soo
15th 2016	Hot Issue Variety Award	Jung So-min
15th 2016	Hot Issue Variety Award	Kim Byung-ok
15th 2016	Hot Issue Variety Award	Kim Mi-kyung
15th 2016	Hot Issue Variety Award	Kim Dae-myung
16th 2018	Hot Issue Variety Award	Hwasa (Mamamoo) and Loco
16th 2018	Hot Issue Variety Award	Jung Chae-yeon
16th 2018	Hot Issue Variety Award	Bong Tae-gyu
16th 2018	Hot Issue Variety Award	Bae Jung-nam
16th 2018	Popularity Award	The Children of The Return of Superman
17th 2019	Hot Issue Entertainer Award	Baekho (Mansuro)
17th 2019	Hot Issue Entertainer Award	Choi Min-hwan (Mr. House Husband 2)
17th 2019	Hot Issue Entertainer Award	Yang Chi-seung (Boss in the Mirror)
17th 2019	Hot Issue Entertainer Award	Jo Myeong-seop (Love Music)
17th 2019	Hot Issue Variety Program	Stars' Top Recipe at Fun-Staurant
17th 2019	Best Icon Award	The Return of Superman Children
17th 2019	Best Challenge Award	Mansuro
17th 2019	Best Challenge Award	Problem Child in House
Year	Award	Winner(s)

==== 2020 – present ====
Year	Award	Winner(s)
18th 2020	Hot Issue Variety Program	Dogs are Incredible
18th 2020	Special Program Award	Korea Again Na Hoon-a
18th 2020	Best Icon Award	The Return of Superman Children
18th 2020	Best Challenge Award	Zombie Detective
19th 2021	Hot Issue TV Personality Award	Lee Yeon-bok (Stars' Top Recipe at Fun-Staurant)
19th 2021	Hot Issue TV Personality Award	Jung Ho-young (Boss in the Mirror)
19th 2021	Best Icon Award	The Children of The Return of Superman
19th 2021	Best Online Content Award	Tomorrow X Together
19th 2021	Popularity Award	Ryu Soo-young (Stars' Top Recipe at Fun-Staurant)
19th 2021	Popularity Award	Song Ga-in (Trot Magic Wanderer Troupe)
19th 2021	Best Challenge Award	The Winners
19th 2021	Entertainer of the Year	Kim Sook (Boss in the Mirror)
19th 2021	Entertainer of the Year	Jun Hyun-moo (Boss in the Mirror)
19th 2021	Entertainer of the Year	Kim Jong-min (2 Days & 1 Night 4)
19th 2021	Entertainer of the Year	Moon Se-yoon (2 Days & 1 Night 4)
19th 2021	Entertainer of the Year	Park Joo-ho and his family (Na Eun, Gun Hoo, Jin Woo) (The Return of Superman)
20th 2022	Popularity Award	Kim Jun-ho (The Return of Superman)
20th 2022	Popularity Award	Jannabi (Immortal Songs: Singing the Legend)
20th 2022	Popularity Award	Jang Do-yeon (Dogs are Amazing)
21st 2023	Popularity Award	Children (The Return of Superman)
21st 2023	Best Icon Award	Choo Sung-hoon (Boss in the Mirror)
21st 2023	Best Icon Award	Lee Mu-jin (LeeMujin Service)
22nd 2024	Popularity Award	Park Yeong-gyu (Mr. House Husband)
22nd 2024	Popularity Award	Lee Mu-jin (LeeMujin Service)
22nd 2024	Best Icon Award	Children (The Return of Superman)
22nd 2024	Best Icon Award	Um Ji-in (Boss in the Mirror)
22nd 2024	Best Icon Award	Lee Yeon-bok (Stars' Top Recipe at Fun-Staurant)
23rd 2025	Popularity Award	Forestella (Immortal Songs: Singing the Legend)
23rd 2025	Popularity Award	Jung Ji-sun (Boss in the Mirror)
23rd 2025	Best Icon Award	Children (The Return of Superman)
23rd 2025	Best Icon Award	Children (Gongbu and Nolbu)
23rd 2025	Special Program Award	Cho Yong-pil, This Moment Forever

== Hosts ==
Ep. #	Year	MC
1	2002	Shin Dong-yup, Lee Hyori
2	2003	Shin Dong-yup, Lee Hyori
3	2004	Lee Hwi-jae, Kang Soo-jung
4	2005	Lee Hwi-jae, Kang Soo-jung
5	2006	Lee Hwi-jae, Baek Seung-joo, Kim Kyung-ran
6	2007	Shin Dong-yup, Lee Hyori
7	2008	Shin Dong-yup, Lee Ji-ae, Kim Sung-eun
8	2009	Lee Kyung-kyu, Lee Ji-ae, Yoona
9	2010	Shin Dong-yup, Lee Ji-ae, Shin Bong-sun
10	2011	Shin Dong-yup, Lee Ji-ae, Yoona
11	2012	Shin Dong-yup, Lee Ji-ae, Bae Suzy
12	2013	Shin Dong-yup, Seo In-guk, Goo Hara
13	2014	Shin Dong-yup, Sung Si-kyung, You Hee-yeol
14	2015	Shin Dong-yup, Sung Si-kyung, Seolhyun
15	2016	Lee Hwi-jae, You Hee-yeol, Lee Hye-ri
16	2018	Shin Hyun-joon, Yoon Shi-yoon, Seolhyun
17	2019	Jun Hyun-moo, Son Dam-bi and Jang Dong-yoon, Kim Jun-hyun
18	2020	Jun Hyun-moo, Jin Se-yeon, Kim Jun-hyun
19	2021	Kim Sung-joo, Moon Se-yoon, Han Sun-hwa
20	2022	Seol In-ah, Moon Se-yoon, Kang Chan-hee
21	2023	Shin Dong-yup, Cho Yi-hyun, Joo Woo-jae
22	2024	Lee Joon, Lee Young-ji, Lee Chan-won
23	2025	Moon Se-yoon, Lee Min-jung, Lee Chan-won

== Ratings ==
=== 2002 – 2020 ===
List of ratings 2002 – 2020

In the ratings below, the highest rating for the show will be in red, and the lowest rating for the show will be in blue.

Ep. #	Original Airdate	TNmS Ratings		Nielsen Ratings	
Ep. #	Original Airdate	Nationwide	Seoul Capital Area	Nationwide	Seoul Capital Area
1	December 28, 2002	18.3% (Part 1); 21.3% (Part 2)	18.6% (Part 1); 21.7% (Part 2)	19.7% (Part 1); 22.7% (Part 2)	18.7% (Part 1); 21.8% (Part 2)
2	December 27, 2003	16.0% (Part 1); 20.9% (Part 2)	15.5% (Part 1); 21.1% (Part 2)	20.1% (Part 1); 25.0% (Part 2)	19.6% (Part 1); 25.2% (Part 2)
3	December 25, 2004	15.4% (Part 1); 15.9% (Part 2)	14.8% (Part 1); 16.9% (Part 2)	12.7% (Part 1); 13.6% (Part 2)	12.1% (Part 1); 14.6% (Part 2)
4	December 24, 2005	15.0% (Part 1); 18.6% (Part 2)	14.8% (Part 1); 19.5% (Part 2)	13.4% (Part 1); 15.8% (Part 2)	13.6% (Part 1); 16.0% (Part 2)
5	December 23, 2006	18.0% (Part 1); 18.9% (Part 2)	17.9% (Part 1); 18.6% (Part 2)	16.5% (Part 1); 18.1% (Part 2)	17.6% (Part 1); 19.2% (Part 2)
6	December 22, 2007	16.0% (Part 1); 20.9% (Part 2)	16.2% (Part 1); 21.4% (Part 2)	14.3% (Part 1); 17.7% (Part 2)	14.1% (Part 1); 17.9% (Part 2)
7	December 27, 2008	20.8% (Part 1); 28.3% (Part 2)	21.2% (Part 1); 28.1% (Part 2)	18.3% (Part 1); 27.1% (Part 2)	18.5% (Part 1); 27.3% (Part 2)
8	December 26, 2009	17.8% (Part 1); 27.3% (Part 2)	18.4% (Part 1); 27.6% (Part 2)	16.0% (Part 1); 24.6% (Part 2)	17.2% (Part 1); 25.8% (Part 2)
9	December 25, 2010	14.3% (Part 1); 22.8% (Part 2)	14.5% (Part 1); 22.6% (Part 2)	13.6% (Part 1); 22.7% (Part 2)	15.4% (Part 1); 24.2% (Part 2)
10	December 24, 2011	12.2% (Part 1); 18.1% (Part 2)	13.9% (Part 1); 19.6% (Part 2)	13.4% (Part 1); 20.0% (Part 2)	14.0% (Part 1); 20.6% (Part 2)
11	December 22, 2012	12.4% (Part 1); 16.9% (Part 2)	13.1% (Part 1); 17.6% (Part 2)	12.2% (Part 1); 16.2% (Part 2)	15.5% (Part 1); 19.5% (Part 2)
12	December 21, 2013	12.9% (Part 1); 13.1% (Part 2)	13.9% (Part 1); 14.8% (Part 2)	13.5% (Part 1); 15.1% (Part 2)	14.0% (Part 1); 16.1% (Part 2)
13	December 27, 2014	13.4% (Part 1); 13.6% (Part 2)	14.2% (Part 1); 16.1% (Part 2)	14.4% (Part 1); 15.0% (Part 2)	14.7% (Part 1); 16.0% (Part 2)
14	December 26, 2015	8.1% (Part 1); 10.3% (Part 2)	8.5% (Part 1); 11.3% (Part 2)	9.7% (Part 1); 12.1% (Part 2)	10.5% (Part 1); 12.2% (Part 2)
15	December 24, 2016	9.9% (Part 1); 12.2% (Part 2)	10.6% (Part 1); 14.5% (Part 2)	10.1% (Part 1); 12.8% (Part 2)	9.6% (Part 1); 13.1% (Part 2)
16	December 22, 2018	10.9% (Part 1); 8.3% (Part 2); 6.6% (Part 3)	—N/a	7.1% (Part 1); 8.2% (Part 2); 7.7% (Part 3)	7.2% (Part 1); 8.5% (Part 2); 8.1%( Part 3)
17	December 21, 2019	—N/a	—N/a	7.6% (Part 1); 7.7% (Part 2)	6.8% (Part 1); 7.9% (Part 2)
18	December 24, 2020	—N/a	—N/a	5.5% (Part 1); 3.5% (Part 2)	5.7% (Part 1); 4.1% (Part 2)

=== 2021 – present ===
In the ratings below, the highest rating for the show will be in red, and the lowest rating for the show will be in blue.

Ep. #	Original Airdate	TNmS Ratings		Nielsen Ratings	
Ep. #	Original Airdate	Nationwide	Seoul Capital Area	Nationwide	Seoul Capital Area
19	December 25, 2021	—N/a	—N/a	7.3% (Part 1); 5.7% (Part 2)	6.4% (Part 1); 5.4% (Part 2)
20	December 24, 2022	—N/a	—N/a	5.2% (Part 1); 4.8% (Part 2)	4.9% (Part 1); 4.7% (Part 2)
21	December 23, 2023	—N/a	—N/a	5.2% (Part 1); 3.6% (Part 2)	—N/a
22	December 21, 2024	—N/a	—N/a	4.6% (Part 1); 3.8% (Part 2)	4.1% (Part 1); 3.8% (Part 2)
23	December 24, 2025	—N/a	—N/a	3.6% (Part 1); 3.4% (Part 2)	2.8% (Part 1); 3.2 (Part 2)

== See also ==
- List of Asian television awards
- KBS Drama Awards
