= Kim Kyung-ran =

South Korean television presenter (born 1977)

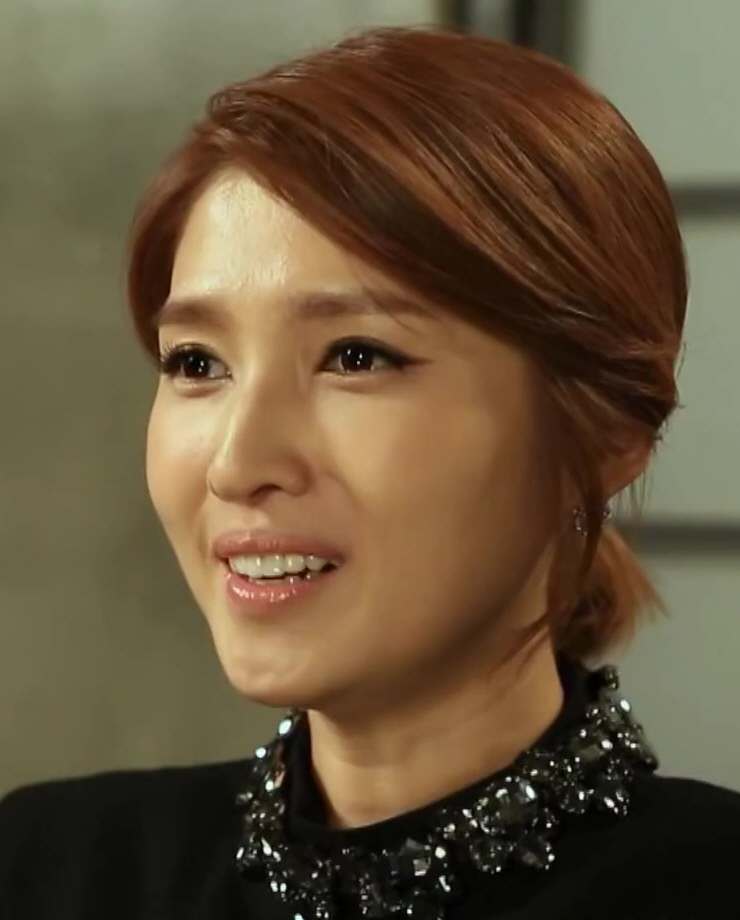
- Born: September 28, 1977 (age 49); Gangnam District, Seoul
- Occupations: Television personality, announcer
- Years active: 2001-present
- Agent: Line Entertainment

Kim Kyung-ran (born September 28, 1977) is a South Korean television personality and former announcer. She was a cast member in the reality show The Genius: Rules of the Game, and is a cast member in the reality show The Genius: Grand Final.

== Filmography ==
=== Television shows ===
Year	Title	Role	Ref.
2013	The Genius: Rules of the Game	Participant	
2015	The Genius: Grand Final	Participant	
2022	Queen of Ssireum	Participant	
2024	Bloody Game Season 3	Participant	
