= Mr. House Husband =

South Korean television show

- Promotional poster
- Also known as: Housekeeping Men
- Hangul: 살림하는 남자들
- RR: Sallimhaneun namjadeul
- MR: Sallimhanŭn namjadŭl
- Genre: Reality television
- Written by: Shim Eun-ha, Shin Yoo-jin, Park Jin-joo, Park Byeong-hee, Park Se-yi, Kim Jin-yeon, Park Eun-yeong, Kim Yeong-jin
- Directed by: Park Hyeong-geun, Lee Chang-soo, Joo Jong-hyun
- Creative director: Lee Hwang-seon
- Starring: Kim Seung-hyun; Kim Seong-soo; Choi Min-hwan
- Narrated by: Choi Yang-rak; Peng Hyun-sook
- Country of origin: South Korea
- Original language: Korean
- No. of seasons: 2
- No. of episodes: 135

Production
- Producer: Jo Hyeon-ah
- Production location: South Korea
- Running time: 65 minutes
- Production company: KBS

Original release
- Network: KBS2, KBS World
- Release: 8 November 2016 – present

Mr. House Husband (Korean: 살림하는 남자들) is a South Korean television entertainment program, where six men who do housekeeping and parenting are observed by their fellow cast members. For season 2, the format changed and the cast members' recordings were observed and narrated by two hosts.

== Broadcasting period ==
| Season | No. of episodes | Broadcasting period | Airtime | Duration |
|---|---|---|---|---|
| 1 | 14 | 8 November 2016 – 7 February 2017 | Tuesday at 11:10 pm – 12:35 am | 85 minutes |
| 2 | 66 | 22 February 2017 – present | Wednesday at 8:55 pm – 10:00 pm | 65 minutes |

== Season 1 ==
=== Cast ===
| Duration | House husband | Location | Notes |
|---|---|---|---|
| 2016–2017; Episodes 1–14 | Kim Seung-woo | Songdo, Incheon | |
| 2016–2017; Episodes 1–14 | Kim Jung-tae | Dalmaji, Haeundae, Busan | |
| 2016–2017; Episodes 1–14 | Kim Il-joong | Yeomchang, Seoul | |
| 2016–2017; Episodes 1–14 | Bong Tae-gyu | Jeongneung, Seoul | |
| 2016–2017; Episodes 1–14 | Moon Se-yoon | Gimpo, Gyeonggi Province | |
| 2017; Episodes 9–14 | Eli (U-KISS) | Jamwon, Seoul | |
| Duration | MC | | |
| 2016–2017; Episodes 1–14 | Kim Seung-woo | | |
| Duration | Fixed panellist | | |
| 2016; Episodes 1–4 | Yoon Son-ha | | |
| 2016–2017; Episodes 5–11, 14 | Son Tae-young | | |

=== Special cast ===
| Duration | House husband | Location | Notes |
|---|---|---|---|
| 2016; Episodes 1–2 | Ha Tae-kwon | Taereung, Gongneung, Seoul | |
| 2016; Episodes 3–4 | Lee Chul-min | Hyehwa, Seoul | |
| 2016; Episodes 5–6 | Kim Beop-rae | Eunpyeong, Seoul | |
| 2016; Episodes 7–8 | Muzie | Jayang, Seoul | |

=== Guest appearances ===
Season 1 guests

| Guests | Episode(s) |
|---|---|
| Choi Seong-min | 7, 9, 11 |
| Yoo Min-sang | 8 |
| Jo Jung-chi | 8 |
| Hwang Je-seong | 11, 14 |
| Byeon Gi-su | 14 |

== Season 2 ==
=== Cast ===
| Duration | House husband | Family | Notes |
|---|---|---|---|
| 2020–present Episodes 162–present | Roh Ji-hoon | Lee Eun-hye (wife) | |
| 2020–present Episodes 165–present | Yoon Joo-Man | Kim Ye-Rin (wife) | |
| 2020–present Episodes 181–present | Jung Sung-Yoon | Kim Mi-Ryeo (wife) | |
| 2021–present Episodes 227–present | Kim Bong-gon | Jeon Hye-ran (wife) | |
| Duration | Narrator(s) | | |
| 2024-present Episodes 340-present | Baek Ji-young and Eun Ji-won | | |

=== Former cast ===
| Duration | House husband | Family | Notes |
|---|---|---|---|
| 2017; Episodes 1–15 | Jung Won-kwan | Kim Geun-hye (wife) Jung Ah-in (daughter) | |
| 2017; Episodes 1–18 | Baek Il-seob | Baek Seung-ho (son) Baek Woo-jin & Baek Woo-joo (grandsons) | |
| 2017; Episodes 1–19 | Eli (U-KISS) | Ji Yeon-soo (wife) Kim Min-soo (Michael) (son) | |
| 2017; Episodes 19–26 | Lee Oi-su | Jeong Yeong-ja (wife) | |
| 2017–2018; Episodes 20–21, 23–29, 31–35, 37–39, 41–50, 52–57, 59–60 | Min Woo-hyuk | Lee Se-mi (LPG) (wife) Park Eden (son) | |
| 2017–2018; Episodes 27–29, 31–34, 37, 39, 42–44 | Song Jae-hee | Ji So-yeon (wife) | |
| 2018; Episodes 45–64, 66–67, 69 | Ryu Philip | Shim Mi-na (wife) | |
| 2018–present Episodes 62–63, 65–77 | Kim Dong-hyun | Song Ha-yeol (wife) | |
| 2018–2019; Episodes 70–71, 73–121 | Kim Seong-soo | Kim Hye-bin (daughter) | |
| 2018–2020; Episodes 86–150 | Choi Min-hwan | Kim Yul-hee (Laboum) (wife) Choi Jae-yul (son) | |
| 2017–2020; Episodes 16–34, 36–160 | Kim Seung-hyun | Kim Soo-bin (daughter) Baek Soo-ah (mother, previously known as Baek Ok-ja); Kim Do-yoon (father, previously known as Kim Yeon-joong) | |
| 2021; Episodes 184–213 | Yang Joon-hyuk | Park Hyun-sun (wife) | |
| 2021–2022; Episodes 217–247 | Eunhyuk | Lee Kang-heon (father) Jang Deok-boon (mother); Lee So-ra (older sister) | |
| Duration | Narrator(s) | | |
| 2017; Episodes 1–16 | Hong Hye-geol and Yeo Esther | | |
| 2017– Episodes 17–184 | Choi Yang-rak and Peng Hyun-sook | | |
| 2021–2022; Episodes 186–249 | Choi Soo-jong and Ha Hee-ra | | |

=== Special cast ===
| Duration | House husband | Family | Notes |
|---|---|---|---|
| 2018; Episode 41 | Choi Yang-rak | Peng Hyun-sook (wife) Choi Hyuk (son) | |

=== Guest appearances ===
Season 2 guests

Note: This list is incomplete.

| Guests | Episode(s) |
|---|---|
| Kim Won-jun | 1 |
| Yoon Jung-soo | 1 |
| Hong Rok-ki | 1 |
| Kim Tae-hyung | 1 |
| Jun (U-KISS) | 2, 13, 17 |
| Soohyun (U-KISS) | 2, 13, 17 |
| Shim Yeong-soon | 5 |
| Kim Hyeong-ja | 6 |
| Nam Jin | 6 |
| Kim Seong-hwan | 6 |
| Hoon (U-KISS) | 13, 17 |
| Kangnam | 13, 72 |
| Lee Sang-won | 13 |
| Lee Sang-hun | 13 |
| Kiseop (U-KISS) | 17 |
| Choi Chang-min | 41 |
| Yoon Taek | 68–69, 72 |
| Bae Ki-sung | 68 |
| Jee Seok-jin | 71 |
| Chun Myung-hoon | 71 |
| Kim Min-kyo (via telephone) | 71 |
| Jo Yeong-hoon (via telephone) | 71 |
| Boom | 72 |
| Moon Se-yoon | 72 |
| Choo Sung-hoon | 72 |

== Ratings ==
In the ratings below, the highest rating for the show will be in red, and the lowest rating will be in blue per section.

=== 2016 ===
List of ratings (episode 1–8)

| Episode | Date | AGB Nielsen Ratings |
|---|---|---|
| 1 | 8 November | 2.5% |
| 2 | 15 November | 2.9% |
| 3 | 22 November | 2.5% |
| 4 | 29 November | 2.5% |
| 5 | 6 December | 2.6% |
| 6 | 13 December | 2.8% |
| 7 | 20 December | 2.4% |
| 8 | 27 December | 2.7% |

=== 2017 (season 1) ===
List of ratings (episode 9–14)

| Episode | Date | AGB Nielsen Ratings |
|---|---|---|
| 9 | 3 January | 2.7% |
| 10 | 10 January | 2.7% |
| 11 | 17 January | 3.2% |
| 12 | 24 January | 2.7% |
| 13 | 31 January | 2.9% |
| 14 | 7 February | 2.0% |

=== 2017 (season 2) ===
List of ratings (episode 1–34)

| Episode | Date | AGB Nielsen Ratings |
|---|---|---|
| 1 | 22 February | 5.3%% |
| 2 | 29 February | 5.7% |
| 3 | 8 March | 4.9% |
| 4 | 15 March | 6.3% |
| 5 | 22 March | 5.4% |
| 6 | 29 March | 4.7% |
| 7 | 5 April | 5.2% |
| 8 | 12 April | 5.2% |
| 9 | 19 April | 5.2% |
| 10 | 26 April | 4.9% |
| 11 | 3 May | 5.8% |
| 12 | 10 May | 6.7% |
| 13 | 17 May | 4.7% |
| 14 | 24 May | 4.2% |
| 15 | 31 May | 3.6% |
| 16 | 7 June | 4.7% |
| 17 | 21 June^{1} | 4.3% |

| Episode | Date | AGB Nielsen Ratings |
|---|---|---|
| 18 | 28 June | 4.3% |
| 19 | 5 July | 4.4% |
| 20 | 12 July | 4.6% |
| 21 | 19 July | 5.0% |
| 22 | 26 July | 4.9% |
| 23 | 2 August | 5.6% |
| 24 | 9 August | 5.0% |
| 25 | 16 August | 6.5% |
| 26 | 23 August | 5.9% |
| 27 | 30 August | 5.7% |
| 28 | 6 September | 7.1% |
| 29 | 13 September | 6.0% |
| 30 | 27 September^{2} | 5.1% |
| 31 | 4 October | 5.6% |
| 32 | 11 October | 5.1% |
| 33 | 18 October | 6.1% |
| 34 | 25 October | 6.5% |

^Note 1:On 14 June 2017 there was a special broadcast of episodes 1–4 of Queen for Seven Days instead of an episode of Mr. House Husband.
^Note 2:On 20 September 2017 a special episode was broadcast.

=== 2018 ===
List of ratings (episode 35–81)

| Episode | Date | AGB Nielsen Ratings |
|---|---|---|
| 35 | 3 January^{3} | 5.5% |
| 36 | 10 January | 6.8% |
| 37 | 17 January | 6.1% |
| 38 | 24 January | 7.2% |
| 39 | 31 January | 6.8% |
| 40 | 7 February | 6.8% |
| 41 | 16 February^{4,}^{5} | 7.0% |
| 42 | 28 February | 6.8% |
| 43 | 7 March | 6.0% |
| 44 | 14 March | 6.8% |
| 45 | 21 March | 7.6% |
| 46 | 28 March | 6.2% |
| 47 | 4 April | 7.5% |
| 48 | 11 April | 6.3% |
| 49 | 18 April | 7.8% |
| 50 | 25 April | 6.8% |
| 51 | 2 May | 7.2% |
| 52 | 9 May | 6.9% |
| 53 | 16 May | 7.7% |
| 54 | 23 May | 6.5% |

| Episode | Date | AGB Nielsen Ratings |
|---|---|---|
| 55 | 30 May | 6.6% |
| 56 | 6 June | 7.8% |
| 57 | 13 June | 7.3% |
| 58 | 27 June^{6} | 7.1% |
| 59 | 4 July | 6.4% |
| 60 | 11 July | 6.2% |
| 61 | 18 July | 7.1% |
| 62 | 25 July | 5.8% |
| 63 | 1 August | 6.1% |
| 64 | 8 August | 6.9% |
| 65 | 22 August^{7} | 7.2% |
| 66 | 29 August | 7.3% |
| 67 | 5 September | 6.6% |
| 68 | 12 September | 6.9% |
| 69 | 19 September | 8.3% |
| 70 | 26 September^{8} | 7.0% |
| 71 | 3 October | 8.5% |
| 72 | 10 October | 6.7% |
| 73 | 17 October | 6.4% |
| 74 | 24 October | 7.2% |

| Episode | Date | AGB Nielsen Ratings |
|---|---|---|
| 75 | 14 November^{9} | 7.3% |
| 76 | 21 November | 7.7% |
| 77 | 28 November | 7.2% |
| 78 | 5 December | 6.7% |
| 79 | 12 December | 7.6% |
| 80 | 19 December | 7.4% |
| 81 | 26 December | 8.7% |

^Note 3:Special episodes were broadcast between 1 November 2017 and 27 January 2018 due to KBS' strike.
^Note 4:From 14 February 2018 to 21 February 2018, the 2018 Pyeong-chang Winter Olympics were being broadcast.
^Note 5:On 16 February 2018, the episode airtime changed to 6:15 pm due to the live broadcast of the 2018 Pyeong-chang Winter Olympics.
^Note 6:On 20 June 2018, the group stage game (Portugal vs. Morocco) of the 2018 Russia World Cup was broadcast in place of an episode of Mr. House Husband.
^Note 7:On 15 August 2018, the women's basketball qualifiers game (Korea vs. Indonesia) of the 2018 Jakarta and Palembang Asian Games was broadcast in place of an episode of Mr. House Husband.
^Note 8:On 25 September 2018, a two-part Chuseok special of Mr. House Husband (Season 2) was broadcast.
^Note 9:On 31 October and 7 November 2018, the 2018 KBO League games were broadcast instead of Mr. House Husband episodes.

=== 2019 ===
List of ratings (episode 82–present)

| Episode | Date | AGB Nielsen Ratings |
|---|---|---|
| 82 | 2 January | 7.6% |
| 83 | 9 January | 8.1% |
| 84 | 16 January | 8.4% |
| 85 | 23 January | 8.4% |
| 86 | 30 January | 8.5% |
| 87 | 6 February | 11.0% |
| 88 | 13 February | 7.3% |
| 89 | 20 February | 7.8% |
| 90 | 27 February | 9.8% |
| 91 | 6 March | 8.2% |
| 92 | 13 March | 8.6% |
| 93 | 20 March | 9.9% |
| 94 | 27 March | 8.3% |
| 95 | 3 April | 8.3% |
| 96 | 10 April | 7.5% |
| 97 | 17 April | 7.6% |
| 98 | 24 April | 7.6% |
| 99 | 1 May | 7.5% |
| 100 | 8 May | 7.5% |
| 101 | 15 May | 7.2% |

| Episode | Date | AGB Nielsen Ratings |
|---|---|---|
| 102 | 22 May | 7.5% |
| 103 | 29 May | 8.3% |
| 104 | 5 June | 7.3% |
| 105 | 12 June | 6.2% |
| 106 | 19 June | 6.5% |
| 107 | 26 June | 7.8% |
| 108 | 3 July | 7.0% |
| 109 | 10 July | 7.8% |
| 110 | 17 July | 7.6% |
| 111 | 24 July | 7.2% |
| 112 | 31 July | 6.8% |
| 113 | 7 August | 7.8% |
| 114 | 14 August | 7.4% |
| 115 | 21 August | 8.3% |
| 116 | 28 August | 7.7% |
| 117 | 4 September | 8.4% |
| 118 | 11 September | 6.7% |
| 119 | 18 September | 7.2% |
| 120 | 25 September | 7.8% |
| 121 | 2 October | 9.3% |

== Awards and nominations ==
| Year | Award | Category | Nominee | Result |
|---|---|---|---|---|
| 2018 | 16th KBS Entertainment Awards | Viewer's Choice Best Program Award | —N/a | Nominated |
| 2018 | 16th KBS Entertainment Awards | Excellence Award in Variety | Kim Seung-hyun | Won |
| 2018 | 16th KBS Entertainment Awards | Best Couple | Kim Yeon-joong & Baek Ok-ja | Won |
| 2018 | 16th KBS Entertainment Awards | Best Entertainer | Choi Yang-rak & Peng Hyun-sook | Won |
| 2018 | 16th KBS Entertainment Awards | Best Newcomer Award | Choi Min-hwan | Nominated |
| 2018 | 16th KBS Entertainment Awards | Writers Award | Shim Eun-ha | Won |
| 2019 | 17th KBS Entertainment Awards | Hot Issue Entertainer Award | Choi Min-hwan | Won |
| 2019 | 17th KBS Entertainment Awards | Top Excellence Award in Show/Entertainment | Kim Seung-hyun | Won |
| 2020 | 18th KBS Entertainment Awards | Rookie Award (Reality Category) | Kim Il-woo | Won |
| 2020 | 18th KBS Entertainment Awards | Best Couple Award | Choi Yang-rak and Peng Hyun-sook | Won |
| 2020 | 18th KBS Entertainment Awards | Best Couple Award | Kim Ye-rin and Yoon Joo-Man | Won |
| 2020 | 18th KBS Entertainment Awards | Top Excellence Award (Reality Category) | Poppin' Hyun Joon and Park Ye-ri | Won |
| 2020 | 18th KBS Entertainment Awards | Viewers' Choice Best Program Award | Mr. House Husband 2 | Nominated |
