= Park Joon-hyung (comedian) =

South Korean entertainer (born 1973)

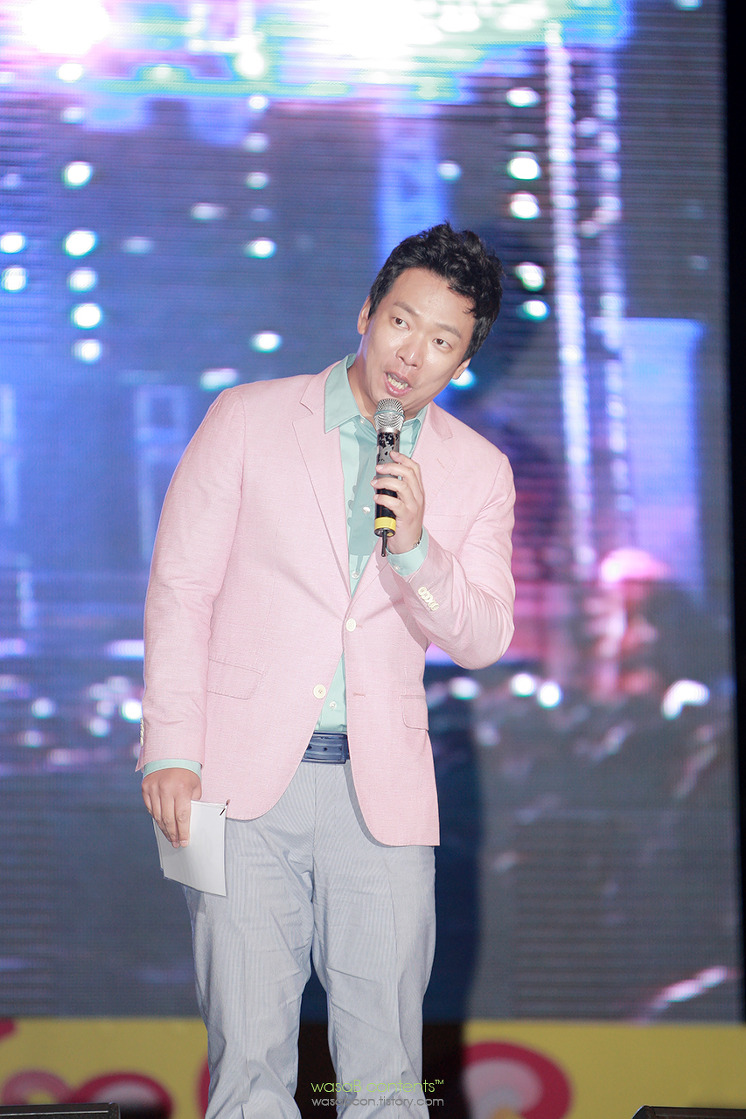
- Born: December 22, 1973 (age 52); Seoul, South Korea

Comedy career
- Years active: 1997–present
- Medium: Stand-up; Television comedy
- Genres: Observational; Sketch; Wit; Parody; Slapstick; Dramatic; Sitcom

- Park Joon-hyung
- Hangul: 박준형
- Hanja: 朴俊亨
- RR: Bak Junhyeong
- MR: Pak Chunhyŏng

Park Joon-hyung (Korean: 박준형; born 22 December 1973) is a South Korean comedian and radio presenter.

== Filmography ==
- Don't be the First One! (Cast member— JTBC 2020–2021)

== Awards and nominations ==
Year	Award	Category	Programme	Result	Note
2019	KBS Entertainment Awards	Comedy Top Excellence Award	Gag Concert	Won	
2017	MBC Entertainment Awards	Radio Top Excellence Award		Won	
2014	MBC Entertainment Awards	Radio Excellence Award		Won	
2013	MBC Entertainment Awards	Radio Excellence Award	Good Week	Won	
2003	Korea Broadcasting Prizes	Comedian Award	Gag Concert	Won	
2003	KBS Entertainment Awards	Grand Prize	Gag Concert	Won	
2002	KBS Entertainment Awards	Comedy Top Excellence Award	Gag Concert	Won	
