= Stars' Top Recipe at Fun-Staurant =

South Korean television program

- Hangul: 신상출시 편스토랑
- Lit.: New Product Release Convi-staurant
- RR: Sinsangchulsi pyeonseutorang
- MR: Sinsangch'ulsi p'yŏnsŭt'orang
- Genre: Cooking; Variety show Talk show
- Starring: See below
- Country of origin: South Korea
- Original language: Korean
- No. of seasons: 1
- No. of episodes: 347 + 2 special

Production
- Production location: South Korea
- Running time: 90 minutes

Original release
- Network: KBS2
- Release: October 25, 2019 – present

Stars' Top Recipe at Fun-Staurant (Korean: 신상출시 편스토랑) is a South Korean television program that airs on KBS2, beginning October 25, 2019. The program is also available to watch on KBS World's YouTube channel from November 5, 2019. The program aired on Fridays from episodes 1 to 324, and from episode 325 it would air on Thursdays at 20:30 (KST).

The program is notable for popularizing the Macanese coffee beverage later known as "Dalgona coffee" by former cast member Jung Il-woo.

== Overview ==
Based on a theme, celebrities will develop and reveal their own creative recipes, plus cooking personally. They will also share various cooking tips and other related helping points. The competing dishes (that should be convenience store-friendly) are then judged by a judge squad, and the winning dish will be available in CU outlets around South Korea the next day after the announcement of the winning dish. In addition, the winning dishes, beginning Round 17, are also available in online markets, in the form of a meal kit.

On May 2, 2022, it was announced that the show has signed a partnership with GS25. The winning dishes, beginning Round 41, will be available in GS25 outlets, instead of CU outlets.

At the program's press conference held on March 27, 2025, it was announced that the program has signed a new partnership with Ourhome for future releases of the winning dishes via online, and in cafeterias of Ourhome offices.

Proceeds from the sales of the winning dishes will be donated to charities. As reported on episode 330 of the show, the amount donated exceeded ₩800 million as of July 2026. (Note: Previously reported on episode 202 that the amount exceeded ₩581 million as at August 2023, had exceeded ₩673 million as reported on episode 246, and exceeded ₩782 million as reported on episode 300.)

=== Judge Squad ===
From the show's premiere to Round 13, the celebrities' dishes were judged by a judge squad. The judge squad consisted of chefs Lee Yeon-bok and Lee Won-il, singer Lee Seung-chul and Kim Jung-hoon, the MD of CU. They will judge the dishes based on these categories: Taste, Texture, Originality, and Marketability. Lee Won-il has not appeared after Round 9, possibly due to the effects of the media reports accusing his wife Kim Yoo-jin of bullying behaviour in the past.

From Rounds 14 to 16, the judge squad consisted of 20 individuals (5 each from the age groups: the 10s, the 20s, the 30s-40s and the 50s-60s). The 20 individuals could include idol singers or the sons/daughters of celebrities. The judge squad also include the guest host(s) of the round and chef Lee Yeon-bok. The judging criteria remains the same. Due to this change, Lee Seung-chul and Kim Jung-hoon have no longer appeared on the show from Round 14.

From Rounds 17 to 40, the judge squad consisted of only chefs, including Lee Yeon-bok as the head judge. Lee Won-il reappeared as part of the judge squad alongside Lee Yeon-bok from Round 33 to Round 40.

From Rounds 41 to 80, a judge squad consisting of Lee Yeon-bok and various experts, together with the special host(s) of the round, would decide in the winning dish. The judge squad would taste the competing dishes without knowing who cooked them.

From Round 81, in each round, each of the competing chefs would personally cook the competing dishes to the judge squad, which consists of Ourhome's staff members, including chefs, researchers and nutritionists.

== Cast ==
=== Host ===
Name	Round(s) Present
Do Kyung-wan	1-21
Heo Kyung-hwan	16-32
Boom	33-present
Hyojung (Oh My Girl)	68-present

=== Fixed Judge Squad ===
Other than being part of the judge squad to judge the food, they will sit together with the guest host(s) and the cast lineup to watch the recorded clips of the celebrities preparing their creative recipes.

==== Current ====
Name	Round(s) Present
Lee Yeon-bok	1-present

==== Former ====
Name	Round(s) Present
Lee Won-il	1-9
Lee Seung-chul	1-13
Kim Jung-hoon (Note: Merchandise Director of CU)	1-13

=== Special Judge Squad ===
Name	Round(s) Present
Choi Hyun-seok	2
Park Mi-kyung (Note: Traditional Korean medicine practitioner)	10
Oh Se-deuk	11, 17, 20, 22-25
Mihal Ashminov	17-24
Raymon Kim	17-24, 26-40
Kim Ho-yoon	17-19, 21, 31
Song Hoon	17, 20
Yoo Hyun-soo	17
Jung Ho-young	18-19, 81
Park Joon-woo	21-40, 81
Lee Won-il	33-40
Le Sserafim (Note: Only Sakura, Kim Chae-won, Huh Yunjin and Hong Eun-chae)	42
Jay Park	45
Abhishek Gupta/Lucky	46
Robin Deiana	46
Moeka Sato	46
Kim Seung-soo	47
Wang Bit-na	47
Kim So-eun	47
Hong Sung-heon	48
Kim Jung-im	48
Hong Hwa-ri	48
Hong Hwa-cheol	48
Yang Hee-eun	49
Park So-hyun	49
Sunwoo Eun-sook	51
Baek Sung-hyun	52
Bae Noo-ri	52
Nmixx (Note: Only Lily, Haewon, Sullyoon and Bae)	53
Yubin (Oh My Girl)	60
Illit (Note: Only Yunah, Moka and Wonhee)	70
Jin Sung	77
Andre Rush	80
Kim Young-ok	87

== Episodes (2019) ==
List of episodes in 2019

Round	Episodes	Broadcast Dates	Theme	Lineup of Competing Chefs	Winning Chef	Winning Dish	Special Host(s)
1	1–4	October 25; November 1 November 8 November 15	Rice	Lee Kyung-kyu, Lee Young-ja, Jung Hye-young, Kim Na-young, Jung Il-woo, Jin Se-yeon	Lee Kyung-kyu	Sesame Sauce Noodles	Hong Jin-kyung
2	5–7	November 22; November 29; December 6	Wheat	Lee Kyung-kyu, Lee Young-ja, Kim Na-young, Jung Il-woo, Jin Se-yeon, Don Spike	Don Spike	"Don's Pie" Meat Pie	Boom
3	8–10	December 13; December 20; January 3, 2020	Pork	Lee Kyung-kyu, Lee Young-ja, Jung Il-woo, Jin Se-yeon, Lee Jung-hyun	Jung Il-woo	Rice Cake Pork Chop Bun	Hong Jin-kyung, Kang Daniel

- Notes:
1. No broadcast on December 27 due to the broadcast of 2019 KBS Song Festival.

== Episodes (2020) ==
List of episodes in 2020

Round	Episodes	Broadcast Dates	Theme	Lineup of Competing Chefs	Winning Chef	Winning Dish	Special Host(s)
4	11–13	January 10; January 17; January 24	Taste of Memory	Lee Kyung-kyu, Lee Young-ja, Jung Il-woo, Lee Jung-hyun, Lee Hye-sung	Lee Young-ja	Taean Soup Noodles	Boom
5	14–16	January 31; February 7 February 14	Chicken	Lee Kyung-kyu, Lee Young-ja, Jung Il-woo, Lee Jung-hyun, Lee Yu-ri	Lee Kyung-kyu	Kkokko-bap	Lee Ji-hoon
6	17–20	February 21; February 28; March 6 March 13	Egg	Lee Kyung-kyu, Lee Young-ja, Jung Il-woo, Lee Jung-hyun, Lee Yu-ri	Lee Jung-hyun	Octopus Egg Bowl	Jeon So-mi
7	20–23	March 13; March 20; March 27; April 3	Street Snacks	Lee Kyung-kyu, Lee Young-ja, Lee Jung-hyun, Lee Yu-ri, Shim Ji-ho	Lee Kyung-kyu	Ang-Kyu-Lee Cream Chewy Noodles	Soyou
8	23–27	April 3 April 10; April 17; April 24; May 1	Wando Abalones	Lee Kyung-kyu, Lee Young-ja, Lee Jung-hyun, Lee Yu-ri, Oh Yoon-ah	Oh Yoon-ah	Abalone Ecklonia Cava Kimbap	Hong Jin-young
9	27–30	May 1 May 8 May 15; May 22	Tuna	Lee Kyung-kyu, Lee Young-ja, Lee Jung-hyun, Oh Yoon-ah, Jo Jung-min	Lee Jung-hyun	Chili Tuna Bibimmyeon	Kim Yong-myung, Kim Woo-seok (UP10TION)
10	30–33	May 22; May 29; June 5 June 12	Immunity Dining Table	Lee Kyung-kyu, Lee Young-ja, Oh Yoon-ah, Jin Sung, Jeon Hye-bin	Lee Young-ja	UP! Duck Rice	Kim Soo-chan, JR (NU'EST)
11	34–36	June 19; June 26; July 3	Beef Cattle	Lee Kyung-kyu, Lee Young-ja, Oh Yoon-ah, Jeon Hye-bin, Han Ji-hye	Lee Kyung-kyu	Tteok-galbi Kyurito	DK (Seventeen)
12	37-39	July 10; July 17; July 24	Gim (seaweed)	Lee Kyung-kyu, Oh Yoon-ah, Han Ji-hye, Jang Min-ho	Lee Kyung-kyu	Fried Gim Bibimbap	Kim Soo-chan, Kim Yo-han (WEi)
13	40-42	July 31; August 7 August 14	Anju	Lee Young-ja, Oh Yoon-ah, Han Ji-hye, Hong Jin-young	Han Ji-hye	Kko Kko Chicken Rice	Kang Daniel
14	43-45	August 21; August 28; September 4	Transcending Generations	Lee Kyung-kyu, Oh Yoon-ah, Han Ji-hye, Han Da-gam	Oh Yoon-ah	NewtRoll	Heo Kyung-hwan, Minhyuk (Monsta X)
15	46-48	September 11; September 18; September 25	Potato	Lee Young-ja, Jin Sung, Han Da-gam, Ham Yon-ji	Lee Young-ja	Potato Dream	Hong Yoon-hwa
16	49-51	October 2 October 9 October 16	Taste of Autumn	Lee Kyung-kyu, Moon Jung-won, Kim Jae-won, Yoon Eun-hye	Kim Jae-won	Fried Shiitake Stuffed with Prawn	—
17	51-54	October 16; October 23; October 30; November 6	1st Anniversary Special: Ramyeon	Lee Kyung-kyu, Lee Young-ja, Lee Yu-ri, Oh Yoon-ah, Ryu Soo-young, Hong Seok-cheon	Lee Kyung-kyu	Fortune Pork Ramyeon	Seventeen (Wonwoo, Seungkwan)
18	55-57	November 13; November 27; December 4	Capsicum	Lee Young-ja, Lee Yu-ri, Kim Jae-won, Ryu Soo-young	Lee Yu-ri	Paprika Red Rice	Choi Yoo-jung (Weki Meki)
19	58-60	December 11; December 25; January 1, 2021	Cheese	Lee Kyung-kyu, Lee Yu-ri, Kim Jae-won, Ryu Soo-young	Ryu Soo-young	Chee Chee Chicken	Kim Bo-min, Dayoung (WJSN)

- Notes:
1. No broadcast on November 20 due to the live broadcast of the 2020 KBO League's 2020 Korean Series.
2. No broadcast on December 18 due to the live broadcast of the 2020 KBS Song Festival.

== Episodes (2021) ==
List of episodes in 2021

Round	Episodes	Broadcast Dates	Theme	Lineup of Competing Chefs	Winning Chef	Winning Dish	Special Host(s)
20	61-63	January 8 January 15; January 22	Eomuk (fishcakes)	Lee Young-ja, Oh Yoon-ah, Han Da-gam, Yoon Eun-hye	Oh Yoon-ah	Squid Jjamppong Eomuk Soup	Lee Jae-sung, Yuqi ((G)I-DLE)
21	64-66	January 29; February 5 February 12	Kimchi	Lee Kyung-kyu, Lee Yu-ri, Kim Jae-won, Park Jung-ah	Kim Jae-won	Hawksbeard Spicy Stir-fried Pork	Yoon Soo-hyun
22	67-69	February 19; February 26; March 5	Dosirak (Lunch box set)	Lee Young-ja, Lee Yu-ri, Oh Yoon-ah, Ryu Soo-young	Lee Young-ja	Five-coloured Risotto	Kim Bo-min, Lee Ji-hye
23	70-72	March 12; March 19; March 26	Partners' Special: Seaweed	Team Gyu-Pam Salad: Lee Kyung-kyu, Lee Young-ja (nominal partner); The HeoChiYu Trio: Lee Yu-ri, Heo Kyung-hwan, Hwang Chi-yeul; Father-Son Funstaurant Wando Soup Team: Kim Jae-won, Kim Yi-jun; Boo Boo Couple: Kan Mi-youn, Hwang Ba-ul	The HeoChiYu Trio	Maesaengi Cream Tteokbokki	Kim Bo-min, Lee Ji-hye, Park Ji-won
24	73-75	April 2 April 9 April 16	Beans	Lee Young-ja, Lee Yu-ri, Kim Jae-won, Ryu Soo-young	Kim Jae-won	Okara Hamburg Steak	Kim Bo-min, Ahn Yeon-hong
25	76-78	April 23; April 30; May 7	Pork	Lee Kyung-kyu, Oh Yoon-ah, Han Ji-hye, Ki Tae-young	Lee Kyung-kyu	Don Kyu Rice Bowl	Ha Do-kwon, Kim Bo-min
26	79-81	May 14; May 21; May 28	Milk	Lee Young-ja, Lee Yu-ri, Ryu Soo-young, Kim Seung-soo	Ryu Soo-young	Tortilla Chee Chicken	Hyun Young, Park So-hyeon
27	82-84	June 4 June 11; June 18	Mandu (Korean dumplings)	Lee Kyung-kyu, Park Jung-ah, Ki Tae-young, Myung Se-bin	Ki Tae-young	Mandu Gambas al Ajillo	Kim Bo-min, Wink, Hong Ja
28	85-87	June 25; July 2 July 9	Chilli Pepper	Lee Young-ja, Lee Yu-ri, Kim Jae-won, Ryu Soo-young	Lee Young-ja	Shishito Peppers Stir-fried Noodles	Kim Bo-min, Ahn Sung-joon, Lee Hong-gi (F.T. Island)
29	88-90	July 16; July 23; July 30	Taste of Summer	Lee Kyung-kyu, Oh Yoon-ah, Ryu Soo-young, Ki Tae-young	Lee Kyung-kyu	Watermelon Chogye Noodles	Jung Si-a, SseuBokMan
30	91-93	August 6 August 13; August 20	Rice	Lee Young-ja, Lee Yu-ri, Ryu Soo-young, Myung Se-bin	Ryu Soo-young	Sesame Soy Vinegar Noodles	Jin A-reum, Inseong (SF9)
31	94-96	August 27; September 3 September 10	K-Food	Lee Kyung-kyu, Ryu Soo-young, Ki Tae-young, Kim Seung-soo	Ryu Soo-young	Honey Condensed Milk Tteokbokki	Oh Yoon-ah, Jung Si-a, Dayoung (WJSN)
32	97-99	September 17; September 24; October 1	Prawn	Lee Young-ja, Kim Jae-won, Lee Min-young, Jung Sang-hoon	Kim Jae-won	Coconut Thai Prawn Curry	Jung Si-a, Inseong (SF9), Seunghee (Oh My Girl)
33	100-103	October 8 October 15; October 22; October 29	100th Episode Special: Ramyeon	Lee Kyung-kyu, Lee Young-ja, Ryu Soo-young, Ki Tae-young, Jung Sang-hoon, Chu Sang-mi	Lee Kyung-kyu	Basil Pesto Ramyeon	Jung Si-a, Seungkwan (Seventeen)
34	104-106	November 5 November 12; November 19	Anju	Lee Kyung-kyu, Ryu Soo-young, Jung Sang-hoon, Park Sol-mi	Jung Sang-hoon	For You Garlic Pork Tail Jokbal	Kim Bo-min, Seungkwan (Seventeen)
35	107-109	December 3 December 10; December 24	Taste of Winter	Lee Young-ja, Oh Yoon-ah, Ryu Soo-young, Ki Tae-young	Ryu Soo-young	Apple Cream Sauce Chicken	Inseong (SF9), Dayoung (WJSN)

- Notes:
1. No broadcast on November 26 due to the live broadcast of the 42nd Blue Dragon Film Awards.
2. No broadcast on December 17 due to the live broadcast of the 2021 KBS Song Festival.
3. No broadcast on December 31 due to the live broadcast of the 2021 KBS Drama Awards.

== Episodes (2022) ==
List of episodes in 2022

Round	Episodes	Broadcast Dates	Theme	Lineup of Competing Chefs	Winning Chef	Winning Dish	Special Host(s)
36	110-113	January 7 January 14; January 21; January 28	Eat into the World	Ryu Soo-young, Ki Tae-young, Park Sol-mi, ChooSangHwa	Park Sol-mi	Pulled Pork Hangover Stew	Kim Bo-min, Kangnam, Dita (Secret Number)
37	114-116	February 4 February 18; February 25	Bunsik	Lee Young-ja, Kim Jae-won, Ryu Soo-young, Jung Sang-hoon	Lee Young-ja	Royal Court Jjolmyeon	Kangnam, Solbin (Laboum)
38	117-119	March 4 March 11; March 18	Chicken	Lee Kyung-kyu, Shim Ji-ho, Jung Sang-hoon, Park Sol-mi	Lee Kyung-kyu	New Chicken Concept Rice Bowl	Kim Bo-min, Jang Won-young (IVE)
39	120-122	March 25; April 1 April 8	Red Flavor	Lee Young-ja, Ryu Soo-young, Jung Sang-hoon, Cha Ye-ryun	Jung Sang-hoon	Meatballs Chilli Aplenty Noodles	Kim Bo-min, Aiki
40 (Note: Final round featuring both Lee Kyung-kyu and Lee Young-ja, before both totally stepped down from the show.)	123-125	April 8 April 15; April 22	Egg	Lee Kyung-kyu, Ryu Soo-young, Park Sol-mi, Park Ha-na	Ryu Soo-young	Mala Sauce Fried Chicken	Lee Young-ja, Kim Bo-min
41	126-128	May 6 May 13; May 20	Korean's Rice	Ryu Soo-young, Cha Ye-ryun, Lee Tae-gon, Lee Chan-won	Lee Chan-won	Jinto-Galbi	Hyojung (Oh My Girl)
42	129-131	May 27; June 3 June 10	Brunch	Ryu Soo-young, Park Sol-mi, Lee Chan-won, Ryu Jin	Park Sol-mi	Doenjang Ragù Pasta	Park Ha-na
43	132-134	June 17; June 24; July 1	Taste of Summer	Shim Ji-ho, Oh Yoon-ah, Cha Ye-ryun, Lee Chan-won	Cha Ye-ryun	Mountain Pile Beef Brisket Bibimmyeon	Hyojung (Oh My Girl)
44	135-137	July 8 July 15; July 22	Vacation Menu	Lee Yu-ri, Ryu Soo-young, Jung Sang-hoon, Choo Sung-hoon	Lee Yu-ri, Choo Sung-hoon (Note: For this round, there is a tie between Lee Yu-ri and Choo Sung-hoon, as Lee Yu-ri's food and Choo Sung-hoon's drink have won. Both the winning food and drink would be released via GS25 outlets at the same time.)	King Fried Shrimp Toast Sandwich + Raw Yam Honey Latte	Choi Ye-bin, Kim Yo-han (WEi)
45	138-140	July 29; August 5 August 12	Anju	Ryu Soo-young, Cha Ye-ryun, Lee Chan-won, Park Joon-geum	Ryu Soo-young	Rose Army Stew	Baek Ji-heon (fromis 9)
46	141-143	August 19; August 26; September 2	Korean's Jang	Han Ji-hye, Park Sol-mi, Lee Chan-won, Kim Gyu-ri	Lee Chan-won	Spicy Cheonggukjang	Fabien Yoon, Dahyun (Twice)
47	144-146	September 9 September 16; September 23	Our Rice	Cha Ye-ryun, Lee Tae-gon, Lee Chan-won, Song Jae-rim	Lee Chan-won	Garlic Butter Jjajangbap	Kangnam, Hyojung (Oh My Girl)
48	147-149	September 30; October 7 October 21	Garlic	Ryu Soo-young, Lee Chan-won, Kim Gyu-ri, Shim Yi-young	Ryu Soo-young	Eo Flavoured Fried Chicken	Kangnam
49	150-153	October 28; November 4 November 11; November 18	Ramyeon	Ryu Soo-young, Park Sol-mi, Cha Ye-ryun, Lee Chan-won, Park Soo-hong	Ryu Soo-young, Park Soo-hong (Note: For this round, there is a tie between Ryu Soo-young and Park Soo-hong. Both their winning dishes would be released via GS25 outlets at the same time, with Ryu Soo-young's dish being released as a meal kit, and Park Soo-hong's dish being released as cup ramyeon.)	Eo Ramyeon + Spicy Seolleongtang Ramyeon	Kim Na-young
50	154-156	December 2 December 9 December 23	K-Food	Shim Ji-ho, Lee Chan-won, Park Soo-hong, Park Tam-hee	Lee Chan-won	Ssamjang Chicken Tteokbokki	Jung Si-a, Sandara Park

- Notes:
1. No broadcast on February 11 due to the live broadcast of the 2022 Winter Olympics.
2. No broadcast on October 14, and a special broadcast was aired, featuring Ryu Soo-young in Rounds 45 and 48, Lee Chan-won in Round 46, and Cha Ye-ryun in Round 45.
3. No broadcast on November 25 due to the live broadcast of the 43rd Blue Dragon Film Awards.
4. No broadcast on December 16 due to the broadcast of 2022 KBS Song Festival.

== Episodes (2023) ==
List of episodes in 2023

Round	Episodes	Broadcast Dates	Theme	Lineup of Competing Chefs	Winning Chef	Winning Dish	Special Host(s)
51	157-160	December 30, 2022; January 6 January 13; January 20	Party Menu	Ryu Soo-young, Cha Ye-ryun, Lee Chan-won, Park Soo-hong	Cha Ye-ryun	Gochujang Bulgogi Lasagna	Jung Si-a, Ayumi, Kim Jong-hyeon
52	161-163	January 27; February 3 February 10	Taste of Memory	Ryu Soo-young, Park Sol-mi, Lee Chan-won, Park Soo-hong	Park Sol-mi	Fiery Stir-fried Pork Oil Tteokbokki	Yeonwoo
53	164-166	February 17; February 24; March 3	Haejang	Ryu Soo-young, Jung Sang-hoon, Cha Ye-ryun, Park Soo-hong	Ryu Soo-young	Pork Belly Gochujang Jjigae	BamBam (Got7)
54	167-169	March 17; March 24; March 31	Rice Power	Ryu Soo-young, Cha Ye-ryun, Lee Tae-gon, Lee Chan-won	Ryu Soo-young	Pollock roe Mayonnaise Jeyuk Rice	Hahm Eun-jung (T-ara), Hanhae
55	170-172	April 7 April 14; April 21	Cheese	Park Sol-mi, Lee Chan-won, Park Soo-hong, Nam Bo-ra	Lee Chan-won	Triple Crown Cheeseburger	Hanhae, Leeseo (Ive)
56	173-176	April 28; May 5 May 12; May 19	Taste of the World	Ryu Soo-young, Lee Chan-won, Park Soo-hong, Kang Soo-jung	Kang Soo-jung	Bibim-Dandan noodles	Sakura (Le Sserafim)
57	177-179	May 26; June 2 June 9	Snack	Oh Yoon-ah, Kang Soo-jung, Park Jung-soo, Choi Gwi-hwa	Oh Yoon-ah, Kang Soo-jung (Note: For this round, there is a tie between Oh Yoon-ah and Kang Soo-jung, as Kang Soo-jung's food and Oh Yoon-ah's drink have won. Both the winning food and drink would be released via GS25 outlets at the same time.)	I'm Fine Sandwich + Zero Vita Green Tea	Hyojung (Oh My Girl), Joohoney (Monsta X), Lee Chae-min
58 (Note: This round features part of Round 59, with the special appearance of Lee Jung-hyun, on episode 180.)	180-183	June 16; June 23; June 30; July 7	Taste of Summer	Ryu Soo-young, Cha Ye-ryun, Lee Chan-won, Park Tam-hee	Lee Chan-won	Buldak Jang-jorim Bibimbap	Hanhae, Sunghoon (Enhypen)
59	184-187	July 14; July 21; July 28; August 4	Anju	Lee Jung-hyun, Ryu Soo-young, Park Soo-hong, Hanhae	Lee Jung-hyun	Mala Soup Jokbal	Sandara Park, Hanhae, Im Hyun-jin (Espero), Hyojung (Oh My Girl) (Note: Only appeared on episode 187.)
60	188-190	August 11; August 18; August 25	Red Flavor	Lee Jung-hyun, Ryu Soo-young, Park Soo-hong, Song Ga-in	Song Ga-in	Garlic Gochujang Osam-bulgogi & Osam-gimbap	Young Tak, Hyojung (Oh My Girl)
61	191-193	September 1 September 8 September 15	Taste of Autumn	Lee Jung-hyun, Ryu Soo-young, Myung Se-bin, Kang Yul	Ryu Soo-young	Rice Thief Shishito Soy Sauce Chicken	Byul, Lee Seo-yeon
62	194-196	September 22; September 29; October 13	Meat is the Truth	Han Ji-hye, Park Soo-hong, Nam Bo-ra, Yang Ji-eun	Han Ji-hye	Bulgogi Jeongol	Byul, J-Us (ONF), Liz (Ive)
63	197-199	October 20; October 27; November 3	MZ Type Menu	Lee Jung-hyun, Ryu Soo-young, Hanhae, Jin Seo-yeon	Lee Jung-hyun	Cheongyang Neapolitan Pasta & Cheongyang Neapolitan Pasta Bread	Nam Chang-hee, Jo Yu-ri
64	200-202	November 10; November 17; December 1	200th Episode Special	Lee Jung-hyun, Lee Sang-yeob, Nam Yoon-su	Lee Sang-yeob	Seafood Jjamppong Bibimbap	Jang Min-ho, Song Hae-na, Hanhae, Hyojung (Oh My Girl)
65	203-206	December 8 December 22; December 29; January 5, 2024	Gukbap	Ryu Soo-young, Lee Chan-won, Jin Seo-yeon, Lee Sang-yeob	Lee Sang-yeob	Spicy Sesame Leaf Sundae Soup	Hanhae, Inseong (SF9), Lee Jung-ha

- Notes:
1. No broadcast on March 10 due to the live broadcast of the 2023 World Baseball Classic.
2. No broadcast on October 6 due to the live broadcast of the 2022 Asian Games.
3. No broadcast on November 24 due to the live broadcast of the 44th Blue Dragon Film Awards.
4. No broadcast on December 15 due to the live broadcast of the 2023 Music Bank Global Festival.

== Episodes (2024) ==
List of episodes in 2024

Round	Episodes	Broadcast Dates	Theme	Lineup of Competing Chefs	Winning Chef	Winning Dish	Special Host(s)
66	207-209	January 12; January 19; January 26	Taste of Winter	Lee Jung-hyun, Ryu Soo-young, Kang Yul, Lee Sang-yeob	Ryu Soo-young	Fire Taste Oyster Sauce Stir-fried Pasta	Sandeul (B1A4), Han Jae-yi, Hyojung (Oh My Girl)
67	210-212	February 2 February 9 February 16	Seollal Special	Han Ji-hye, Jang Min-ho, Jin Seo-yeon, Yoon Yoo-sun	Jang Min-ho	Mentaiko Potato Cream Udon	Hyojung (Oh My Girl), Hong Ji-yun, Kim Chae-won (Le Sserafim)
68 (Note: Appearance by Han Ji-hye in this round, but she would not be competing.)	213-215	February 23; March 1 March 8	New Academic Term Special	Cha Ye-ryun, Lee Sang-yeob, Han Chae-young	Lee Sang-yeob	Deep Fried Eomuk Yaki Udon	Brian Joo (Fly to the Sky), Lee Jang-jun (Golden Child)
69 (Note: Appearance by Kim Ho-joong in this round, but he would not be competing.)	216-219	March 15; March 22; March 29; April 5	Everyone's Lunch	Lee Jung-hyun, Jang Min-ho, Jin Seo-yeon, Nam Yoon-su	Lee Jung-hyun	Doubanjiang Stir-fried Pork	Hanhae, Kim Da-hyun
70	220-222	April 12; April 19; April 26	Everyone's Lunch	Lee Jung-hyun, Ryu Soo-young, Yang Ji-eun, Lee Sang-yeob	Ryu Soo-young	Lifetime Yukgaejang	Lee Jang-jun (Golden Child)
— (Note: This round would not be counted at all due to Kim Ho-joong's hit-and run controversy.)	223-225	May 3 May 10; May 17	Everyone's Lunch	Jang Min-ho, Ryu Soo-young, Jin Seo-yeon, Kim Ho-joong	—N/a (Note: For this round, the winning dish, regardless of who the winner is, will not be released in GS25 convenience stores. It was later revealed that Kim Ho-joong won the round, but it would not be included on the winning tally.)		Hanhae
71 (Note: Appearances by Ryu Soo-young and Jin Seo-yeon in this round, but they would not be competing.)	225-228	May 17; May 24; May 31; June 7	Everyone's Lunch	Jang Min-ho, Kang Yul, Kim Jae-joong	Jang Min-ho	Eel Chueo-tang	Jung Yong-hwa (CNBLUE), Hong Ji-yun
72 (Note: Appearances by Jang Min-ho and Ryu Soo-young in this round, but they would not be competing.)	229-231	June 14; June 21; June 28	Everyone's Lunch	Lee Jung-hyun, Jin Seo-yeon, Nam Yoon-su	Jin Seo-yeon, Nam Yoon-su (Note: For this round, there is a tie between Jin Seo-yeon and Nam Yoon-su, as Nam Yoon-su's food and Jin Seo-yeon's drink have won. Both the winning food and drink would be released via GS25 outlets at the same time.)	Buldak Cold Ramyeon + Apple Cider Vinegar Mojito	Lee Jung-shin (CNBLUE)
73 (Note: Appearances by Jin Seo-yeon, Yoon Yoo-sun and Yang Ji-eun in this round, but they would not be competing.)	232-235	July 5 July 12; July 19; July 26	Everyone's Dinner	Jang Min-ho, Ryu Soo-young, Kim Jae-joong	Kim Jae-joong	Spicy Perilla Oil Mak-guksu	Moon Seong-hyun
74 (Note: Appearance by Yang Ji-eun in this round, but she would not be competing.)	236-238	August 16; August 23; August 30	Everyone's Dinner	Ryu Soo-young, Jin Seo-yeon, Lee Sang-woo	Lee Sang-woo	Spicy Galbi-jjim on Rice	Hanhae, Kwon Eun-bi
75	239; 241-242; 244	September 6 September 20; September 27; October 11	Everyone's Dinner	Jang Min-ho, Lee Chan-won, Nam Yoon-su, Kim Jae-joong	Lee Chan-won	Spicy Gamja-tang Ramyeon	Bae Hye-ji, Hong Eun-chae (Le Sserafim)
76	240; 243; 246	September 13; October 4 October 25	5th Anniversary Special: Set Menu	Lee Jung-hyun, Ryu Soo-young, Lee Sang-woo	Ryu Soo-young	Charcoal Grilled Pork Galbi Set	Lee Hyun-yi, Kim Jae-won
77	245; 247; 249	October 18; November 1 November 15	Meal Kit	Lee Jung-hyun, Jang Min-ho, Kim Jae-joong	Lee Jung-hyun	Stir-fried Walnut Garlic Stem on Rice + Lemon Cream Walnut Bread	Lee Hyun-yi, Lee Gwan-hee
78 (Note: Appearance by Kim Jae-joong in this round, but he would not be competing.)	248; 250-252	November 8 November 22; December 6 December 13	Everyone's One Meal	Ryu Soo-young, Lee Chan-won, Lee Sang-woo	Lee Sang-woo	Tofu Stir-fried Pork Kal-guksu with Rice	Pyo Chang-won, Jung Young-ju

- Notes:
1. No broadcast on August 2 and 9 due to the live broadcast of the 2024 Summer Olympics.
2. No broadcast on November 29 due to the live broadcast of the 45th Blue Dragon Film Awards.
3. No broadcast on December 20 due to the live broadcast of the 2024 Music Bank Global Festival.

== Episodes (2025) ==
List of episodes in 2025

Round	Episodes	Broadcast Dates	Theme	Lineup of Competing Chefs	Winning Chef	Winning Dish	Special Host(s)
79 (Note: Appearance by Jang Min-ho in this round, but he would not be competing.)	253-255	December 27, 2024; January 10; January 17	Everyone's One Meal (New Year Special)	Lee Jung-hyun, Ryu Soo-young, Yoon Jong-hoon	Ryu Soo-young, Yoon Jong-hoon (Note: For this round, there is a tie between Ryu Soo-young and Yoon Jong-hoon. Ryu Soo-young's dish would be released in GS25 outlets, while Yoon Jong-hoon's dish would be released as a meal kit.)	Spicy Dried Squid Strips on Rice + Dak-dori-tang Noodles	Kang Soo-jung, Baek Ji-heon (Fromis 9)
80	256-258	January 24; January 31; February 7	Everyone's One Meal	Kim Jae-joong, Lee Sang-woo, Jang Shin-young	Kim Jae-joong	Chilli Tuna Mandu Stew	Lee Geum-hee
—N/a	259; 262-263	February 14; March 7 March 14	—N/a	Jang Min-ho, Nam Bo-ra, Yoon Jong-hoon	—N/a		—N/a
—N/a	260-261; 264	February 21; February 28; March 21	—N/a	Ryu Soo-young, Lee Sang-woo, Jang Shin-young	—N/a		Hong Ji-yun
81	265-267	March 28; April 4 April 11	Rice Bowl (Partnership Battle)	Nam Bo-ra & Park Eun-yeong (Ddaenggeuriz); Kim Jae-joong & Kwon Seong-joon (Matfia's Joong-centre); Hong Ji-yun & Lee Yeon-bok (Bok-Lucky Ji-yun)	Kim Jae-joong & Kwon Seong-joon (Matfia's Joong-centre)	Italian Galbi-jjim Kkakdugi Fried Rice Bowl	—N/a
82	268-270	April 18; April 25; May 2	Soup	Lee Chan-won, Nam Yoon-su, Ki Eun-se	Lee Chan-won	Beef Knee Yukgaejang	Jung Ho-young, Lee Gi-kwang (Highlight), Yerin (GFriend)
83	271-273	May 9 May 16; May 23	Noodles	Lee Jung-hyun, Monsta X (Shownu, Joohoney), Ha Young	Lee Jung-hyun	Spring Onion Cream Pasta	Jung Young-ju
84	274-276	May 30; June 6 June 13	Jjim	Jang Shin-young, Ki Eun-se, Park Tae-hwan	Jang Shin-young	Perilla Siraegi Jjimdak	Hanhae, Lee Si-an
85	277-279	June 20; June 27; July 4	Anju	Lee Jung-hyun, Jang Min-ho, Kim Jun-hyun	Jang Min-ho	Mala Toowoomba Pasta Pork Cartilage	Baek Ji-heon (Fromis 9)
86	280-282	July 11; July 25; August 1	Meat Party	Kim Jae-joong, Lee Sang-woo, Kim Kum-soon	Kim Jae-joong	Fire Jjamppong Back Ribs	Yeji (Itzy)
—N/a	283-285	August 8 August 15; August 22	Rejuvenation Recipes	Lee Jung-hyun, Jang Shin-young, Kim Kang-woo	—N/a		Hanhae, Chanelle Moon (Fifty Fifty)
—N/a	286-288	August 29; September 5 September 12	—N/a	Lee Jung-hyun, Nam Bo-ra, Kim Kang-woo	—N/a		Shin Ji (Koyote), Ko Kyu-pil, Gaeul (Ive)
87	289-291	September 19; September 26; October 3	Mom's Taste (Chuseok Special)	Kim Jae-joong & Yoo Man-soon (Note: Kim Jae-joong's mother.); Park Tae-hwan & Yoo Sung-mi (Note: Park Tae-hwan's mother.); Song Ga-in & Song Sun-dan (Note: Song Ga-in's mother.)	Song Ga-in & Song Sun-dan	Jindo Turmeric Chicken Gomtang	Hyojin (ONF)
88	292-294	October 10; October 17; October 24	Meat is Love	Lee Chan-won, Kim Kang-woo, Son Yeon-jae	Lee Chan-won	Big Amazing Dongaseu	Ayumi
89	295-297	October 31; November 7 November 14	Kimchi	Lee Jung-hyun, Kim Jae-joong, Ko Woo-rim (Forestella)	Ko Woo-rim	Yuzu Dongchimi	Kangnam
90	298-300	November 21; November 28; December 5	Meat	Jang Min-ho, Kim Kang-woo, Moon Jeong-hee	Jang Min-ho	Cured LA Galbi	Hanhae, Dohee (Say My Name)
—N/a	301-303	December 12; December 26; January 2, 2026	—N/a	Lee Jung-hyun, Nam Bo-ra, Kim Kang-woo	—N/a	—N/a	Kang Soo-jung

- Notes:
1. No broadcast on January 3 in light of the Jeju Air Flight 2216 accident.
2. No broadcast on July 18 due to the live broadcast of the 4th Blue Dragon Series Awards.
3. No broadcast on December 19 due to the live broadcast of the 2025 Music Bank Global Festival.

== Episodes (2026) ==
List of episodes in 2026

Round	Episodes	Broadcast Dates	Theme	Lineup of Competing Chefs	Winning Chef	Winning Dish	Special Host(s)
—N/a	304-306	January 9 January 16; January 23	—N/a	Jang Min-ho, Moon Jeong-hee, Son Tae-jin (Forte di Quattro)	—N/a	—N/a	Han Bo-reum, Yoon Bo-mi (Apink)
91	307-309	January 30; February 6 February 13	War of Pigs	Lee Jung-hyun, Kim Jun-hyun, Oh Sang-jin	Kim Jun-hyun	Fire Scent Pork Rice Bowl	Suh Dong-joo
92	310-312	February 20; February 27; March 6	Immunity Dining Table	Nam Bo-ra, Kim Kang-woo, Sunye	Kim Kang-woo	Black Garlic Neobiani	Kim Yong-bin
93 (Note: Appearance by Park Shin-yang in this round, but he would not be competing.)	313-315	March 13; March 20; March 27	Chicken Fight	Lee Jung-hyun, Oh Sang-jin, Shiho Yano	Oh Sang-jin	Samgye Pot Rice	Jeon Yu-jin
94 (Note: Appearance by Oh Sang-jin in this round, but he would not be competing.)	316-318	April 3 April 10; April 17	Our Beans	Kim Jae-joong, Kim Kang-woo, Hyomin (T-ara)	Kim Jae-joong	Curry Beany Hamburg Steak Set	Julie (Kiss of Life)
95 (Note: Appearances by Shin Ji (Koyote) & MoonOne in this round, but they would not be competing.)	319-321	April 24; May 1 May 8	Soup	Moon Jeong-hee, Shiho Yano, Kim Yong-bin	Kim Yong-bin	Daechang Dak-bokkeum-tang	Jung Sang-hoon
96	323-325	May 22; May 29; June 4	World Cup Support Menu	Lee Jung-hyun, Son Tae-jin (Forte di Quattro), Shin Ji (Koyote) & MoonOne	Son Tae-jin	Crunchy One Bite Boneless Chicken	Kim Young-hee
—N/a	322; 326-327	May 15; June 11; June 18	—N/a	Jang Min-ho, Kim Jae-joong, Ji Seung-hyun	—N/a	—N/a	Hong Ji-yun
97 (Note: Appearance by Namkoong Min in this round, but he would not be competing.)	328-330	July 2 July 9 July 16	Noodles	Lee Jung-hyun, Shiho Yano, Kim Yong-bin	Shiho Yano	Spicy Dak-galbi Aburasoba	Eom Ji-in
98 (Note: Appearances by Lee Jung-hyun and Ha Seok-jin in this round, but they would not be competing.)	331-333	July 23; August 6 August 13	Anju	Lee Chan-won, Oh Sang-jin, Ji Seung-hyun	Lee Chan-won	Sesame Bomb Sundae Jeongol	Nam Bo-ra
99	334-336	August 20; August 27; September 3	Kimchi	Nam Bo-ra, Kim Jae-joong, Kim Yong-bin	Kim Yong-bin	Asian Leek Kimchi	Yang Ji-eun
100 (Note: Appearance by Sim Soo-bong, but she would not be competing.)	337-339	September 10; September 17; October 1	Chuseok Special: Family Recipe	Son Tae-jin (Forte di Quattro), Shiho Yano, Ji Seung-hyun	Son Tae-jin	Son Family Tteok-galbi	Kim Ho-young
101	340-342	October 8 October 15; October 22	Perfect Match Special	Lee Jung-hyun, Do Kyung-wan, Ahn Sung-hoon	Ahn Sung-hoon	Smoked Duck Garlic Stem Bibimbap	Kim Bo-min
—N/a (Note: Appearance by Park Sung-woong, but he would not be competing.)	343-345	October 29; November 5 November 12	7th Anniversary Special: Homeward	Lee Yu-ri, Oh Yoon-ah, Do Kyung-wan	—N/a	—N/a	Evan, Ateez (Yeosang, Yunho)
—N/a	346-348	November 19; November 26; December 3	TBA	Ji Seung-hyun, Do Kyung-wan, TBA	—N/a	—N/a	Kim Bo-min

- Notes:
1. From Episode 325, the broadcast time has shifted to Thursdays at 20:30 (KST).
2. No broadcast on June 25 due to the broadcast of the highlights special of the 2026 FIFA World Cup match between South Korea and South Africa.
3. No broadcast on July 30, and a special broadcast was aired, featuring Kim Jae-joong, Shiho Yano, Jang Min-ho and Lee Chan-won.
4. No broadcast on September 24 due to the broadcast of the Chuseok special program Your Life is a Never Ending Story - Lee Seung-chul.

== Winning tally ==
Chef	Wins	Rounds Participated
Lee Kyung-kyu	10	1-12, 14, 16-17, 19, 21, 23, 25, 27, 29, 31, 33-34, 38, 40
Lee Young-ja	6	1-11, 13, 15, 17-18, 20, 22-24, 26, 28, 30, 32-33, 35, 37, 39
Jung Hye-young	0	1
Kim Na-young	0	1-2
Jung Il-woo	1	1-6
Jin Se-yeon	0	1-3
Don Spike	1	2
Lee Jung-hyun	7	3-9, 59-61, 63-64, 66, 69-70, 72, 76-77, 79, 83, 85, 89, 91, 93, 96-97
Lee Hye-sung	0	4
Lee Yu-ri	3	5-8, 17-19, 21-24, 26, 28, 30, 44
Shim Ji-ho	0	7, 38, 43, 50
Oh Yoon-ah	4	8-14, 17, 20, 22, 25, 29, 35, 43, 57
Jo Jung-min	0	9
Jin Sung	0	10, 15
Jeon Hye-bin	0	10-11
Han Ji-hye	2	11-14, 25, 46, 62, 67
Jang Min-ho	4	12, 67, 69, 71, 73, 75, 77, 85, 90
Hong Jin-young	0	13
Han Da-gam	0	14-15, 20
Ham Yon-ji	0	15
Moon Jung-won	0	16
Kim Jae-won	4	16, 18-19, 21, 23-24, 28, 32, 37
Yoon Eun-hye	0	16, 20
Ryu Soo-young	16	17-19, 22, 24, 26, 28-31, 33-37, 39-42, 44-45, 48-49, 51-54, 56, 58-61, 63, 65-66, 68, 70, 73-74, 76, 78-79
Hong Seok-cheon	0	17
Park Jung-ah	0	21, 27
Kan Mi-youn	0	23
Ki Tae-young	1	25, 27, 29, 31, 33, 35-36
Kim Seung-soo	0	26, 31
Myung Se-bin	0	27, 30, 61
Lee Min-young	0	32
Jung Sang-hoon	2	32-34, 37-39, 44, 53
Chu Sang-mi	0	33
Park Sol-mi	3	34, 36, 38, 40, 42, 46, 49, 52, 55
Choo Sung-hoon	1	36, 44
Cha Ye-ryun	2	39, 41, 43, 45, 47, 49, 51, 53-54, 58, 68
Park Ha-na	0	40
Lee Tae-gon	0	41, 47, 54
Lee Chan-won	10	41-43, 45-52, 54-56, 58, 65, 75, 78, 82, 88, 98
Ryu Jin	0	42
Park Joon-geum	0	45
Kim Gyu-ri	0	46, 48
Song Jae-rim	0	47
Shim Yi-young	0	48
Park Soo-hong	1	49-53, 55-56, 59-60, 62
Park Tam-hee	0	50, 58
Nam Bo-ra	0	55, 62, 81, 92, 99
Kang Soo-jung	2	56-57
Park Jung-soo	0	57
Choi Gwi-hwa	0	57
Hanhae	0	59, 63
Song Ga-in	2	60, 87
Kang Yul	0	61, 66, 71
Yang Ji-eun	0	62, 70
Jin Seo-yeon	1	63, 65, 67, 69, 72, 74
Lee Sang-yeob	3	64-66, 68, 70
Nam Yoon-su	1	64, 69, 72, 75, 82
Yoon Yoo-sun	0	67
Han Chae-young	0	68
Kim Jae-joong	5	71, 73, 75, 77, 80-81, 86-87, 89, 94, 96, 99
Lee Sang-woo	2	74, 76, 78, 80, 86
Yoon Jong-hoon	1	79
Jang Shin-young	1	80, 84
Hong Ji-yun	0	81
Ki Eun-se	0	82, 84
Monsta X	0	83
Ha Young	0	83
Park Tae-hwan	0	84, 87
Kim Jun-hyun	1	85, 91
Kim Kum-soon	0	86
Kim Kang-woo	1	88, 90, 92, 94
Son Yeon-jae	0	88
Ko Woo-rim	1	89
Moon Jeong-hee	0	90, 95
Oh Sang-jin	1	91, 93, 98
Sunye	0	92
Shiho Yano	1	93, 95, 97, 100
Hyomin	0	94
Kim Yong-bin	2	95, 97, 99
Son Tae-jin	2	96, 100
Shin Ji (Koyote) & MoonOne	0	96
Ji Seung-hyun	0	98, 100
Do Kyung-wan	0	101
Ahn Sung-hoon	1	101

== Ratings ==
- Ratings listed below are the individual corner ratings of Stars' Top Recipe at Fun-Staurant. (Note: Individual corner ratings do not include commercial time, which regular ratings include.)
- In the ratings below, the highest rating for the show will be in red and the lowest rating for the show will be in blue each year.

=== 2019 ===
List of ratings in 2019 (episodes 1–9)

Episode #	Broadcast Date	AGB Nielsen Ratings (Nationwide)	
Episode #	Broadcast Date	Part 1	Part 2
1	October 25	3.7%	5.5%
2	November 1	3.2%	4.8%
3	November 8	3.1%	4.9%
4	November 15	3.9%	5.4%
5	November 22	3.0%	4.2%
6	November 29	3.8%	5.4%
7	December 6	2.7%	4.4%
8	December 13	3.8%	5.1%
9	December 20	3.2%	5.5%

=== 2020 ===
List of ratings in 2020 (episode 10–59)

Episode #	Broadcast Date	AGB Nielsen Ratings (Nationwide)	
Episode #	Broadcast Date	Part 1	Part 2
10	January 3	3.5%	4.3%
11	January 10	3.6%	5.0%
12	January 17	3.8%	4.9%
13	January 24	4.4%	5.9%
14	January 31	4.0%	5.5%
15	February 7	3.6%	5.7%
16	February 14	4.0%	5.2%
17	February 21	4.1%	6.5%
18	February 28	4.8%	7.0%
19	March 6	4.5%	6.5%
20	March 13	4.3%	6.3%
21	March 20	5.5%	5.8%
22	March 27	6.5%	7.9%
23	April 3	6.9%	7.8%
24	April 10	5.7%	6.7%
25	April 17	5.5%	5.6%
26	April 24	4.6%	5.7%
27	May 1	3.9%	5.9%
28	May 8	3.2%	4.7%
29	May 15	2.7%	4.1%
30	May 22	2.9%	5.8%
31	May 29	3.5%	5.9%
32	June 5	3.3%	5.4%
33	June 12	2.8%	4.7%
34	June 19	2.9%	5.4%
35	June 26	2.1%	5.8%
36	July 3	2.6%	5.5%
37	July 10	4.8%	6.1%
38	July 17	4.7%	5.1%
39	July 24	4.3%	6.1%
40	July 31	3.7%	5.0%
41	August 7	4.3%	5.1%
42	August 14	4.5%	6.5%
43	August 21	3.2%	5.2%
44	August 28	3.7%	5.3%
45	September 4	3.2%	4.0%
46	September 11	3.4%	4.5%
47	September 18	3.6%	4.3%
48	September 25	2.6%	3.0%
49	October 2	2.9%	5.1%
50	October 9	3.4%	5.1%
51	October 16	3.6%	5.0%
52	October 23	3.3%	5.0%
53	October 30	3.0%	4.8%
54	November 6	3.7%	5.3%
55	November 13	3.7%	5.6%
56	November 27	3.6%	5.3%
57	December 4	3.7%	5.4%
58	December 11	4.3%	6.7%
59	December 25	3.9%	5.3%

=== 2021 ===
List of ratings in 2021 (episode 60–109)

Episode #	Broadcast Date	AGB Nielsen Ratings (Nationwide)	
Episode #	Broadcast Date	Part 1	Part 2
60	January 1	3.8%	4.9%
61	January 8	3.6%	6.4%
62	January 15	4.8%	6.3%
63	January 22	4.0%	4.9%
64	January 29	3.8%	4.9%
65	February 5	3.5%	4.9%
66	February 12	3.2%	3.0%
67	February 19	3.0%	3.4%
68	February 26	2.4%	2.2%
69	March 5	2.7%	4.5%
70	March 12	2.9%	2.4%
71	March 19	2.8%	2.6%
72	March 26	2.5%	2.5%
73	April 2	2.2%	2.6%
74	April 9	4.5%	5.1%
75	April 16	3.9%	5.2%
76	April 23	4.1%	4.8%
77	April 30	4.2%	4.5%
78	May 7	3.5%	4.2%
79	May 14	4.2%	4.9%
80	May 21	3.9%	4.6%
81	May 28	4.2%	4.8%
82	June 4	2.7%	3.7%
83	June 11	3.2%	3.5%
84	June 18	2.8%	3.5%
85	June 25	3.9%	4.5%
86	July 2	3.6%	
87	July 9	3.7%	
88	July 16	3.5%	
89	July 23	4.7%	
90	July 30	3.9%	
91	August 6	3.1%	
92	August 13	3.3%	
93	August 20	3.8%	
94	August 27	4.1%	
95	September 3	3.6%	
96	September 10	3.0%	
97	September 17	5.0%	
98	September 24	3.2%	
99	October 1	3.4%	
100	October 8	3.4%	
101	October 15	3.4%	
102	October 22	3.1%	
103	October 29	3.7%	
104	November 5	3.7%	
105	November 12	3.5%	
106	November 19	4.0%	
107	December 3	3.6%	
108	December 10	4.2%	
109	December 24	3.8%	

=== 2022 ===
List of ratings in 2022 (episode 110–157)

Episode #	Broadcast Date	AGB Nielsen Ratings (Nationwide)
110	January 7	5.3%
111	January 14	4.8%
112	January 21	4.7%
113	January 28	4.5%
114	February 4	5.2%
115	February 18	4.4%
116	February 25	5.4%
117	March 4	5.2%
118	March 11	4.8%
119	March 18	4.1%
120	March 25	4.5%
121	April 1	4.3%
122	April 8	3.8%
123	April 15	5.2%
124	April 22	4.4%
125	April 29	3.9%
126	May 6	5.2%
127	May 13	5.9%
128	May 20	4.7%
129	May 27	4.7%
130	June 3	4.2%
131	June 10	3.9%
132	June 17	4.7%
133	June 24	4.2%
134	July 1	4.4%
135	July 8	3.8%
136	July 15	4.3%
137	July 22	4.1%
138	July 29	4.9%
139	August 5	4.2%
140	August 12	3.2%
141	August 19	5.4%
142	August 26	5.7%
143	September 2	4.1%
144	September 9	4.0%
145	September 16	4.3%
146	September 23	3.9%
147	September 30	4.3%
148	October 7	4.9%
Special	October 14	4.0%
149	October 21	4.1%
150	October 28	4.5%
151	November 4	4.8%
152	November 11	5.0%
153	November 18	4.0%
154	December 2	4.9%
155	December 9	5.0%
156	December 23	5.0%
157	December 30	4.8%

=== 2023 ===
List of ratings in 2023 (episode 158–205)

Episode #	Broadcast Date	AGB Nielsen Ratings (Nationwide)
158	January 6	5.4%
159	January 13	4.2%
160	January 20	4.5%
161	January 27	4.5%
162	February 3	4.2%
163	February 10	4.4%
164	February 17	4.4%
165	February 24	3.7%
166	March 3	4.4%
167	March 17	3.7%
168	March 24	3.6%
169	March 31	3.4%
170	April 7	4.5%
171	April 14	3.9%
172	April 21	3.5%
173	April 28	3.7%
174	May 5	4.4%
175	May 12	4.2%
176	May 19	4.0%
177	May 26	4.1%
178	June 2	3.3%
179	June 9	3.5%
180	June 16	4.1%
181	June 23	4.3%
182	June 30	4.5%
183	July 7	4.3%
184	July 14	4.2%
185	July 21	3.9%
186	July 28	5.2%
187	August 4	3.8%
188	August 11	4.8%
189	August 18	4.7%
190	August 25	4.2%
191	September 1	3.9%
192	September 8	4.1%
193	September 15	4.1%
194	September 22	3.8%
195	September 29	2.1%
196	October 13	3.7%
197	October 20	3.9%
198	October 27	4.2%
199	November 3	3.9%
200	November 10	2.1%
201	November 17	4.1%
202	December 1	3.6%
203	December 8	4.3%
204	December 22	4.0%
205	December 29	3.3%

=== 2024 ===
List of ratings in 2024 (episode 206–253)

Episode #	Broadcast Date	AGB Nielsen Ratings (Nationwide)
206	January 5	4.2%
207	January 12	3.8%
208	January 19	5.0%
209	January 26	4.7%
210	February 2	4.0%
211	February 9	3.9%
212	February 16	3.9%
213	February 23	3.8%
214	March 1	3.9%
215	March 8	3.8%
216	March 15	3.4%
217	March 22	3.8%
218	March 29	3.6%
219	April 5	3.5%
220	April 12	2.9%
221	April 19	3.2%
222	April 26	3.0%
223	May 3	3.6%
224	May 10	4.0%
225	May 17	2.6%
226	May 24	3.4%
227	May 31	3.0%
228	June 7	3.7%
229	June 14	3.5%
230	June 21	3.3%
231	June 28	3.0%
232	July 5	2.6%
233	July 12	3.1%
234	July 19	1.7%
235	July 26	2.7%
236	August 16	3.3%
237	August 23	3.9%
238	August 30	2.9%
239	September 6	3.6%
240	September 13	4.3%
241	September 20	3.5%
242	September 27	3.3%
243	October 4	3.3%
244	October 11	3.3%
245	October 18	3.5%
246	October 25	3.4%
247	November 1	3.8%
248	November 8	3.9%
249	November 15	3.1%
250	November 22	4.5%
251	December 6	4.3%
252	December 13	3.7%
253	December 27	3.9%

=== 2025 ===
List of ratings in 2025 (episode 254–302)

Episode #	Broadcast Date	AGB Nielsen Ratings (Nationwide)
254	January 10	4.3%
255	January 17	4.4%
256	January 24	4.2%
257	January 31	4.9%
258	February 7	4.8%
259	February 14	4.2%
260	February 21	3.9%
261	February 28	3.6%
262	March 7	3.8%
263	March 14	4.0%
264	March 21	3.8%
265	March 28	3.7%
266	April 4	4.7%
267	April 11	3.5%
268	April 18	4.1%
269	April 25	3.9%
270	May 2	3.5%
271	May 9	3.7%
272	May 16	3.5%
273	May 23	3.6%
274	May 30	3.9%
275	June 6	4.3%
276	June 13	3.7%
277	June 20	4.6%
278	June 27	3.6%
279	July 4	3.8%
280	July 11	3.4%
281	July 25	3.6%
282	August 1	3.6%
283	August 8	3.3%
284	August 15	3.4%
285	August 22	3.3%
286	August 29	3.1%
287	September 5	3.7%
288	September 12	3.3%
289	September 19	3.8%
290	September 26	3.9%
291	October 3	3.8%
292	October 10	4.0%
293	October 17	3.7%
294	October 24	3.0%
295	October 31	3.2%
296	November 7	3.7%
297	November 14	2.9%
298	November 21	3.8%
299	November 28	3.4%
300	December 5	3.2%
301	December 12	4.0%
302	December 26	3.3%

=== 2026 ===
List of ratings in 2026 (episode 303–present)

Episode #	Broadcast Date	AGB Nielsen Ratings (Nationwide)
303	January 2	3.3%
304	January 9	3.7%
305	January 16	3.7%
306	January 23	4.0%
307	January 30	3.0%
308	February 6	4.0%
309	February 13	2.9%
310	February 20	3.4%
311	February 27	3.3%
312	March 6	2.2%
313	March 13	3.1%
314	March 20	3.2%
315	March 27	2.9%
316	April 3	1.7%
317	April 10	2.7%
318	April 17	2.2%
319	April 24	2.2%
320	May 1	2.8%
321	May 8	0.7%
322	May 15	1.9%
323	May 22	2.1%
324	May 29	2.2%
325	June 4	2.6%
326	June 11	2.3%
327	June 18	1.9%
328	July 2	2.1%
329	July 9	2.5%
330	July 16	2.1%
331	July 23	2.1%
Special 2	July 30	3.1%
332	August 6	2.9%
333	August 13	2.7%
334	August 20	3.1%
335	August 27	3.0%
336	September 3	3.1%
337	September 10	2.2%
338	September 17	3.5%
339	October 1	2.6%
340	October 8	3.1%
341	October 15	3.5%
342	October 22	3.3%
343	October 29	2.6%
344	November 5	2.5%
345	November 12	2.5%
346	November 19	2.6%
347	November 26	%

== Awards and nominations ==
Year	Award	Category	Recipient	Result	Ref.
2019	2019 KBS Entertainment Awards	Hot Issue Program Award	Stars' Top Recipe at Fun-Staurant	Won	
2019	2019 KBS Entertainment Awards	Excellence Award (Show-Entertainment)	Do Kyung-wan	Won	
2019	2019 KBS Entertainment Awards	Rookie Award (Show-Entertainment)	Jung Il-woo	Won	
2019	2019 KBS Entertainment Awards	Best Couple Award	Lee Kyung-kyu, Lee Young-ja	Won	
2019	2019 KBS Entertainment Awards	Broadcast Writer Award	Baek Soon-young	Won	
2020	2020 KBS Entertainment Awards	Best Program Award	Stars' Top Recipe at Fun-Staurant	Nominated	
2020	2020 KBS Entertainment Awards	Grand Prize (Daesang)	Lee Kyung-kyu	Nominated	
2020	2020 KBS Entertainment Awards	Viewers' Choice Best Program Award	Stars' Top Recipe at Fun-Staurant	Nominated	
2020	2020 KBS Entertainment Awards	Excellence Award (Reality)	Lee Yu-ri	Won	
2020	2020 KBS Entertainment Awards	Excellence Award (Reality)	Oh Yoon-ah	Nominated	
2020	2020 KBS Entertainment Awards	Top Excellence Award (Reality)	Lee Young-ja	Nominated	
2020	2020 KBS Entertainment Awards	Top Excellence Award (Reality)	Lee Yeon-bok	Nominated	
2020	2020 KBS Entertainment Awards	Top Excellence Award (Reality)	Do Kyung-wan	Nominated	
2020	2020 KBS Entertainment Awards	Best Entertainer Award (Reality)	Oh Yoon-ah	Won	
2020	2020 KBS Entertainment Awards	Best Entertainer Award (Reality)	Ryu Soo-young	Won	
2020	2020 KBS Entertainment Awards	Rookie Award (Reality)	Kim Jae-won	Won	
2020	2020 KBS Entertainment Awards	Rookie Award (Reality)	Ryu Soo-young	Nominated	
2020	2020 KBS Entertainment Awards	Producers' Special Award	Lee Young-ja	Won	
2021	2021 KBS Entertainment Awards	Hot Issue TV Personality Award	Lee Yeon-bok	Won	
2021	2021 KBS Entertainment Awards	Popularity Award	Ryu Soo-young	Won	
2021	2021 KBS Entertainment Awards	Excellence Award (Reality)	Oh Yoon-ah	Won	
2021	2021 KBS Entertainment Awards	Excellence Award (Reality)	Ki Tae-young	Nominated	
2021	2021 KBS Entertainment Awards	Top Excellence Award (Reality)	Lee Young-ja	Nominated	
2021	2021 KBS Entertainment Awards	Top Excellence Award (Reality)	Ryu Soo-young	Nominated	
2022	2022 KBS Entertainment Awards	Best Entertainer Award	Cha Ye-ryun	Won	
2022	2022 KBS Entertainment Awards	Rookie Award (Show and Variety)	Cha Ye-ryun	Nominated	
2022	2022 KBS Entertainment Awards	Excellence Award (Show and Variety)	Lee Chan-won	Won	
2022	2022 KBS Entertainment Awards	Excellence Award (Show and Variety)	Boom	Nominated	
2022	2022 KBS Entertainment Awards	Top Excellence Award (Show and Variety)	Ryu Soo-young	Won	
2022	2022 KBS Entertainment Awards	Viewers' Choice Best Program Award	Stars' Top Recipe at Fun-Staurant	Nominated	
2023	2023 KBS Entertainment Awards	Grand Prize (Daesang)	Ryu Soo-young	Nominated	
2023	2023 KBS Entertainment Awards	Entertainer of the Year Award	Ryu Soo-young	Won	
2023	2023 KBS Entertainment Awards	Viewers' Choice Best Program Award	Stars' Top Recipe at Fun-Staurant	Nominated	
2023	2023 KBS Entertainment Awards	Top Excellence Award (Reality)	Lee Chan-won	Won	
2023	2023 KBS Entertainment Awards	Excellence Award (Reality)	Lee Jung-hyun	Nominated	
2023	2023 KBS Entertainment Awards	Producers' Special Award	Boom	Won	
2023	2023 KBS Entertainment Awards	Rookie Award (Reality)	Jin Seo-yeon	Won	
2023	2023 KBS Entertainment Awards	Rookie Award (Reality)	Lee Sang-yeob	Nominated	
2024	2024 KBS Entertainment Awards	Grand Prize (Daesang)	Lee Chan-won	Won	
2024	2024 KBS Entertainment Awards	Grand Prize (Daesang)	Ryu Soo-young	Nominated	
2024	2024 KBS Entertainment Awards	Entertainer of the Year Award	Ryu Soo-young	Won	
2024	2024 KBS Entertainment Awards	Entertainer of the Year Award	Lee Chan-won	Won	
2024	2024 KBS Entertainment Awards	Viewers' Choice Best Program Award	Stars' Top Recipe at Fun-Staurant	Nominated	
2024	2024 KBS Entertainment Awards	Top Excellence Award (Reality)	Jang Min-ho	Won	
2024	2024 KBS Entertainment Awards	Best Icon Award	Lee Yeon-bok	Won	
2024	2024 KBS Entertainment Awards	Rookie Award (Reality)	Lee Sang-woo	Won	
2024	2024 KBS Entertainment Awards	Rookie Award (Reality)	Nam Yoon-su	Nominated	
2025	2025 KBS Entertainment Awards	Grand Prize (Daesang)	Boom	Nominated	
2025	2025 KBS Entertainment Awards	Grand Prize (Daesang)	Lee Chan-won	Nominated	
2025	2025 KBS Entertainment Awards	Entertainer of the Year Award	Boom	Won	
2025	2025 KBS Entertainment Awards	Entertainer of the Year Award	Lee Chan-won	Won	
2025	2025 KBS Entertainment Awards	Viewers' Choice Best Program Award	Stars' Top Recipe at Fun-Staurant	Nominated	
2025	2025 KBS Entertainment Awards	Top Excellence Award (Reality)	Lee Jung-hyun	Won	
2025	2025 KBS Entertainment Awards	Excellence Award (Reality)	Kim Jae-joong	Won	
2025	2025 KBS Entertainment Awards	Rookie Award (Reality)	Kim Kang-woo	Won	
2025	2025 KBS Entertainment Awards	Broadcast PD Award	Lee Hae-nim	Won	

== Spin-off ==
On September 3, 2025, KBS announced a spin-off of the program titled Ko So-young's Pub-Staurant, hosted by Ko So-young who returned to hosting in KBS after 28 years. It was aired on the KBS Entertainment YouTube channel and KBS2 beginning September 8, and lasted for 10 episodes.
