= Tteokbokki =

Korean spicy rice cake dish

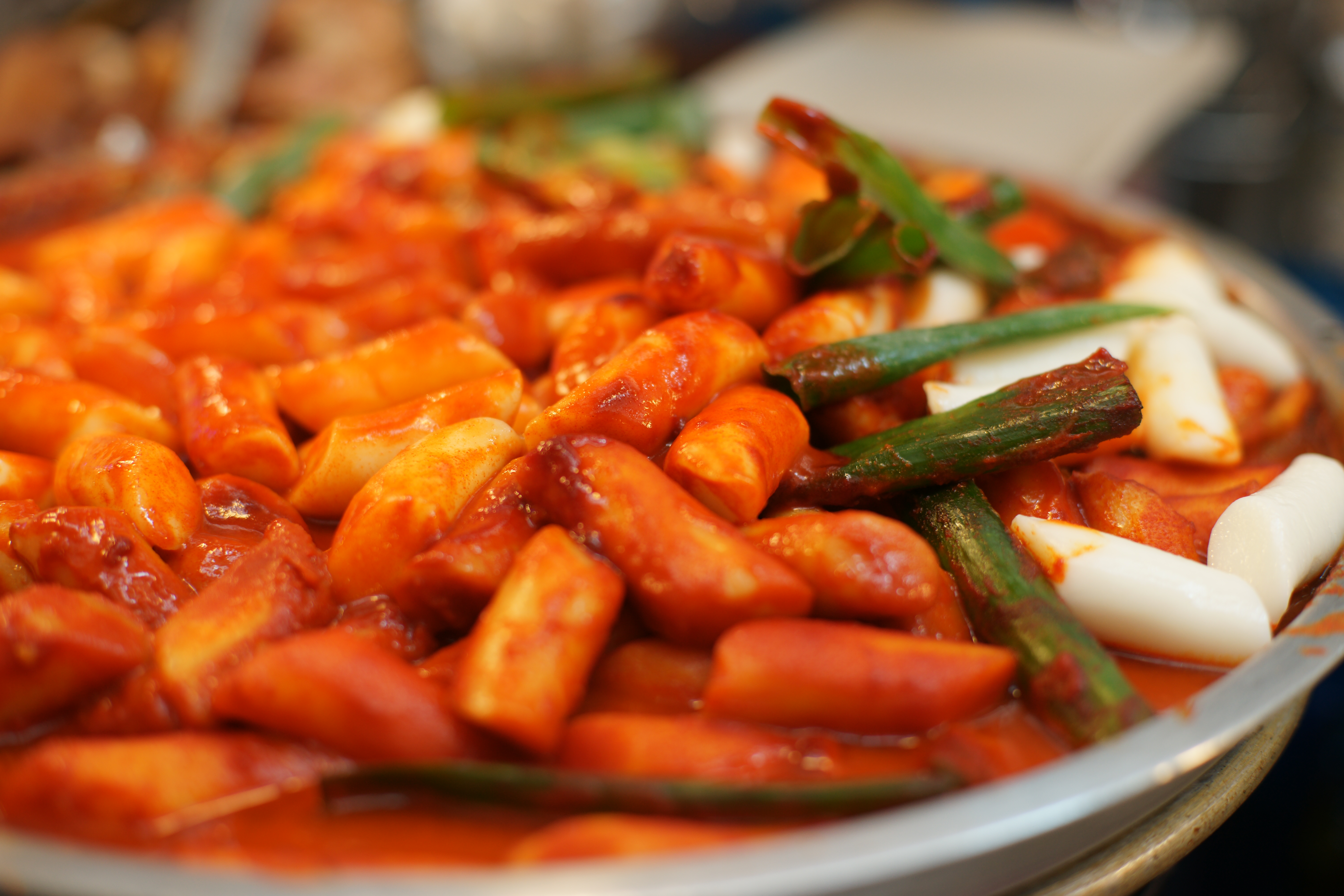
- Alternative names: Stir-fried rice cake, tteobokki, tteok-bokki, dukbokki
- Type: Bokkeum
- Place of origin: Korea
- Associated cuisine: Korean cuisine
- Main ingredients: Tteok (rice cakes), fishcake, gochujang
- Variations: Gungjung-tteokbokki, rabokki

Korean name
- Hangul: 떡볶이
- RR: tteokbokki
- MR: ttŏkpokki
- IPA: [t͈ʌk̚p͈ok͈i]

Tteokbokki (Note: English: /ˈtʌkbɒki, ˈtʌkboʊki/ TUK-bok-ee, TUK-boh-kee) (Korean: 떡볶이), (Note: Korean pronunciation: [t͈ʌk̚p͈ok͈i]) topokki or simmered rice cake, is a Korean food made from small-sized garae-tteok (long, white, cylinder-shaped rice cakes) called tteokmyeon (떡면; lit. 'rice cake noodles') or commonly tteokbokki-tteok (떡볶이 떡; lit. 'tteokbokki rice cakes'). It is often paired with eomuk (fish cakes), boiled eggs, and scallions, and seasoned with spicy gochujang (chili paste). Less often, it is served in a non-spicy ganjang-based (soy) sauce, which is sometimes called gungjung-tteokbokki (royal court tteokbokki).

Today, variations include curry tteokbokki, cream sauce tteokbokki, jajang-tteokbokki, seafood tteokbokki, rose tteokbokki, galbi-tteokbokki and so on. Tteokbokki is commonly purchased and eaten at bunsikjip (snack bars) as well as pojangmacha (street stalls). There are also dedicated restaurants for tteokbokki, referred to as jeukseok tteokbokki (impromptu tteokbokki). It is also a popular home dish, as the garae-tteok can be purchased in pre-packaged, semi-dehydrated form.

== History ==
The first record of tteokbokki appears in Siŭijŏnsŏ, a 19th-century cookbook, where the dish was listed using the archaic spelling steokbokgi (ᄯᅥᆨ복기). According to the book, tteokbokki was known by various names, including tteokjjim (steamed rice cakes), tteok-japchae (stir-fried rice cakes), and tteok-jeongol (rice cakes hot pot). The royal court version was made from white tteok (rice cakes), sirloin, sesame oil, soy sauce, scallions, rock tripe, pine nuts, and toasted and ground sesame seeds. In contrast, the savory, soy sauce–based tteokbokki was made in the head house of the Papyeong Yun clan, where high-quality soy sauce was brewed. In this version, ingredients such as short ribs were common. The name tteokbokki also appears in the revised and enlarged edition of Chosŏn mussang sinsik yorijepŏp, where it is described as a savory soy sauce–based dish.

The spicy variant of tteokbokki made with gochujang-based sauce is believed first appeared in 1953, when Ma Bok-rim participated in the opening of a Korean-Chinese restaurant. She accidentally dropped tteok, or rice cake, that was handed out during the opening into jajangmyeon. Realizing that it tasted good, she developed the idea of seasoning tteok in the Korean chili sauce, gochujang. After that, she began selling it in Sindang, which now has since become the most common variant of tteokbokki. Today, the typical tteokbokki purchased and eaten at bunsikjip (snack bars) and pojangmacha (street stalls) are red and spicy, while the soy sauce–based, non-spicy version is referred to as gungjung-tteokbokki (궁중떡볶이; lit. 'royal court tteokbokki'). Rice tteok rose in popularity as the South Korean economy developed, and various versions of the dish have proliferated since then. From the 1950s, imported wheat flour became more widely distributed in South Korea, contributing to the growth of inexpensive flour-based foods collectively known as bunsik. Wheat-flour rice cakes consequently became a common alternative to rice-based tteok in tteokbokki. The spicy version became widely popular as an inexpensive snack during the 1970s, although both wheat- and rice-based rice cakes have continued to be used.

Tteokbokki has become one of Korea's most recognisable street food. More and more stores around the world are selling tteokbokki directly, one such example is the selling of Korean red pepper paste tteokbokki at the home of the NFL's Houston Texans.

Tteokbokki was brought by restaurateurs to North Korea in 2017 and became a popular dish there. In 2024, North Korea banned the sale of tteokbokki, along with budae-jjigae, from sale in restaurants because the dishes are of South Korean origin.

The 2022 English translation of South Korean author Baek Se-hee’s million plus-selling memoir, I Want to Die but I Want to Eat Tteokbokki, brought the dish to a global audience.

== Varieties ==
Like other popular Korean dishes, tteokbokki has seen numerous variations and fusions. Boiled eggs and pan-fried mandu (dumplings) were traditionally added to tteokbokki. Ingredients such as seafood, short ribs, instant noodles, and chewy noodles are also common additions to the dish.

=== Variations based on added ingredients ===
Haemul-tteokbokki (해물떡볶이; lit. 'seafood tteokbokki') features seafood as its secondary ingredient.

Galbi-tteokbokki (갈비떡볶이; lit. 'short rib tteokbokki') features short ribs as its secondary ingredient.

Rabokki (라볶이; lit. 'instant noodle tteokbokki' and jjolbokki (쫄볶이; lit. 'chewy noodle tteokbokki') are similar variants which add noodles to tteokbokki. Rabokki adds ramyeon (ramen) noodles, and jjolbokki adds chewy jjolmyeon wheat noodles.

==== Jeukseok-tteokbokki ====
Jeongol (hot pot)-type tteokbokki is called jeukseok-tteokbokki (즉석떡볶이; lit. 'on-the-spot tteokbokki'), and is boiled on a table-top stove during the meal. A variety of additions, such as vegetables, mandu (dumplings), and ramyeon or udong noodles are available at jeukseok-tteokbokki restaurants. As jeukseok-tteokbokki is usually a meal rather than a snack, it is often paired with bokkeum-bap (fried rice).

=== Variation based on sauce ===
==== Gochujang tteokbokki ====
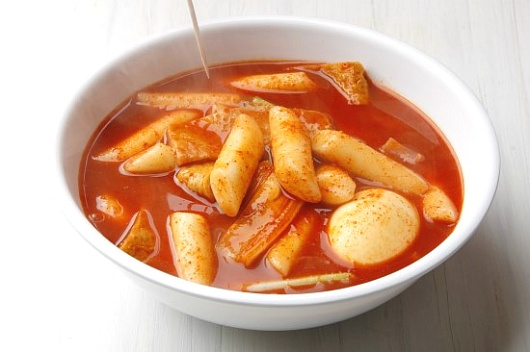
Soupy gungmul-tteokbokki

Piquant, red gochujang-based tteokbokki is one of Korea's most popular snacks. While both soup-style gungmul-tteokbokki (국물떡볶이; lit. 'soup tteokbokki') and dry gireum-tteokbokki (기름떡볶이; lit. 'oil tteokbokki') are commonly enjoyed, the former is considered the de facto standard style. In gungmul-tteokbokki, kelp-anchovy stock is often used to bring out the savory flavor. Gochugaru (chili powder) is often added for additional heat and color, while mullyeot (rice syrup) helps with sweetness and consistency. Eomuk (fish cakes), boiled eggs, and diagonally sliced scallions are common additions to the dish. In gireum-tteokbokki, the mixture of gochugaru, soy sauce, sugar or syrup, and sesame oil often replaces gochujang (chili paste). Soft tteok sticks are seasoned with the sauce mixture, then stir-fried in cooking oil with a handful of chopped scallions and served. Tongin Market in Jongno, Seoul is famous for its gireum-tteokbokki.

There are also many variations in gochujang tteokbokki, such as a version that is seasoned with perilla leaf.

==== Gungjung tteokbokki ====
Sweet and savory, brown soy sauce–based tteokbokki is often referred to as gungjung-tteokbokki (궁중떡볶이; lit. 'royal court tteokbokki'). Its history dates back to a royal court dish before the introduction of chili pepper to the Korean peninsula in the mid-Joseon era (17th and 18th centuries). The earliest record of gungjung tteokbokki is found in an 1800s cookbook called Siuijeonseo. Having a taste similar to japchae (stir-fried glass noodles and vegetables), it was enjoyed by the royals as a banchan and as a snack. Although traditional tteokbokki was made with soup soy sauce, which is the traditional (and at the time, the only) type of soy sauce in pre-modern Korea, sweeter regular soy sauce has taken its place in modern times. Other traditional ingredients such as sirloin or short ribs, sesame oil, scallions, rock tripe, pine nuts, and toasted and ground sesame seeds are still commonly used in modern gungjung-tteokbokki. Other ingredients such as mung bean sprouts, carrots, onions, dried Korean zucchini, garlic, and shiitake mushrooms are also common. The dish is typically served with egg garnish.

==== Other variations ====
Gungmul (soup) tteokbokki are not based on either soy sauce or gochujang and have also gained in popularity. There are some well-known variations.

Curry tteokbokki uses a yellow Korean-style curry base.

Cream sauce tteokbokki uses a base inspired by carbonara. Cream sauce and bacon are used instead of gochujang and fish cakes.

Rosé tteokbokki is a variation of tteokbokki made by adding cream, milk, or cheese to the red sauce, giving it a milder flavor and a light orange color.

Mala tteokbokki is a fusion tteokbokki dish that uses a base inspired by Chinese malatang. This variation may include mala sauce, wide glass noodles, and bok choy in addition to traditional tteokbokki ingredients.

Jajang-tteokbokki features a sauce based on jajang (sweet bean paste).

Cheese tteokbokki is a variant in which the tteokbokki is either topped or stuffed with cheese. It is sold in snack bars and can also easily be made at home. Depending on personal preference, it can be eaten with seasonings such as green tea powder, herb powder, sesame, or parsley.

Outside of Korea, Shanghainese chǎo niángāo (炒年糕) is a stir-fried dish made with tteok-like rice cakes sliced into flat oval shapes, scallions, beef, pork and cabbage.

==== Gireum and gyeran tteokbokki ====
Gireum tteokbokki (기름떡볶이; lit. 'oil tteokbokki') is a variety of tteokbokki that is stir-fried in oil and served with little or no sauce.

Gyeran tteokbokki (계란떡볶이; lit. 'egg tteokbokki') is another variation that features no sauce. Only tteok (rice cakes), eggs, vegetables, and seasonings (primarily salt) are used. It differs from gireum tteokbokki in that it is not spicy.

== Gallery ==
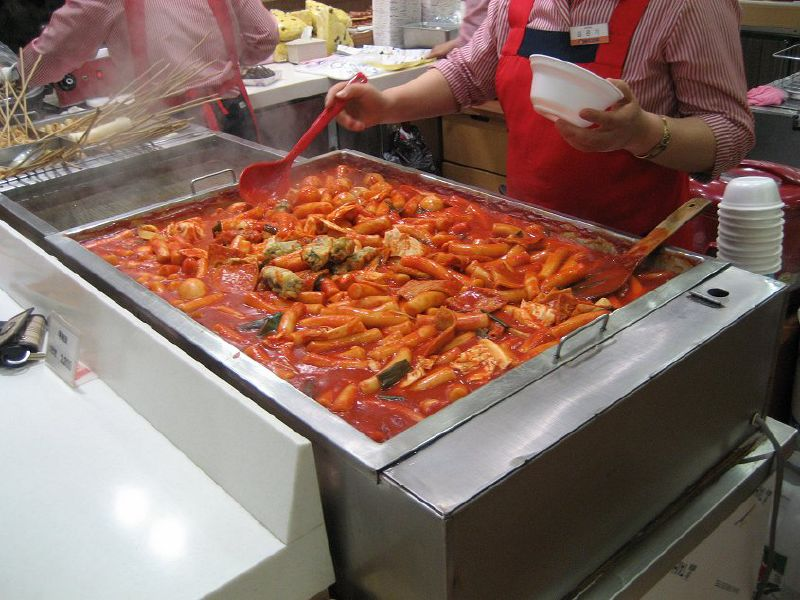
Tteokbokki at a bunsikjip (snack bar)

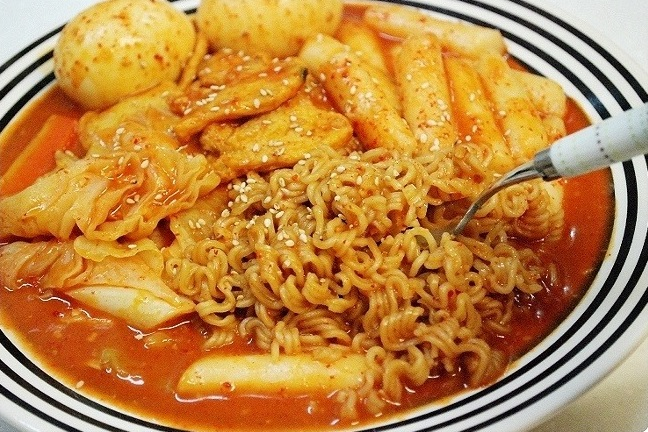
Rabokki (tteokbokki with ramyeon noodles)

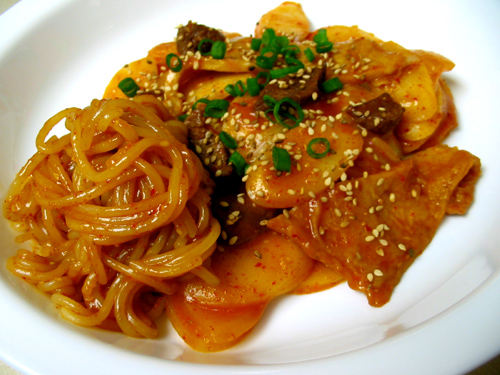
Jjolbokki (tteokbokki with jjolmyeon noodles)

== See also ==
- Bunsik
- Gimbap
- Korean cuisine
- Korean royal court cuisine
- Nian gao
- Rice cake
- Sundae
