= Rabokki =

South Korean dish

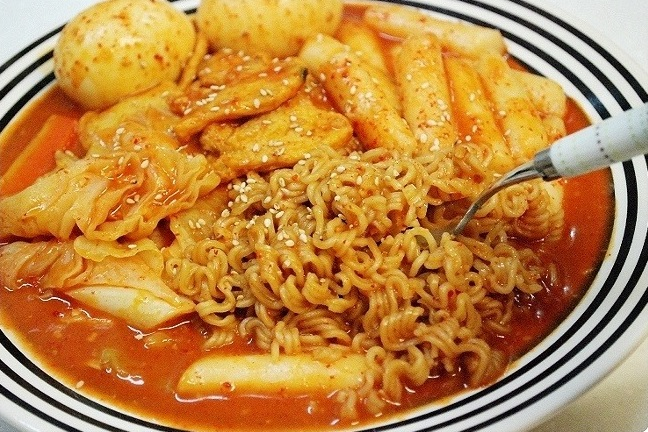
- Type: Tteokbokki
- Place of origin: Korea
- Main ingredients: Tteok, ramyeon

Korean name
- Hangul: 라볶이
- RR: rabokki
- MR: rabokki
- IPA: [ɾa.p͈o.k͈i]

Rabokki (Korean: 라볶이) is a type of tteokbokki (stir-fried rice cakes), with added ramyeon noodles. It is a street food commonly sold in bunsikjip (snack bars). As with other tteokbokki dishes, eomuk (fish cakes) and boiled eggs are a common addition. Cream sauce or Western-style chili sauce may be used instead of gochujang (Korean chili paste).

== Etymology ==
Rabokki is a Korean-language portmanteau that combines the words for ramyeon (라면), and tteokbokki (떡볶이). The literal meaning is to add ramyeon noodles to rice cakes.
