= Gangneung Joongang Market =

Market in Gangneung, South Korea

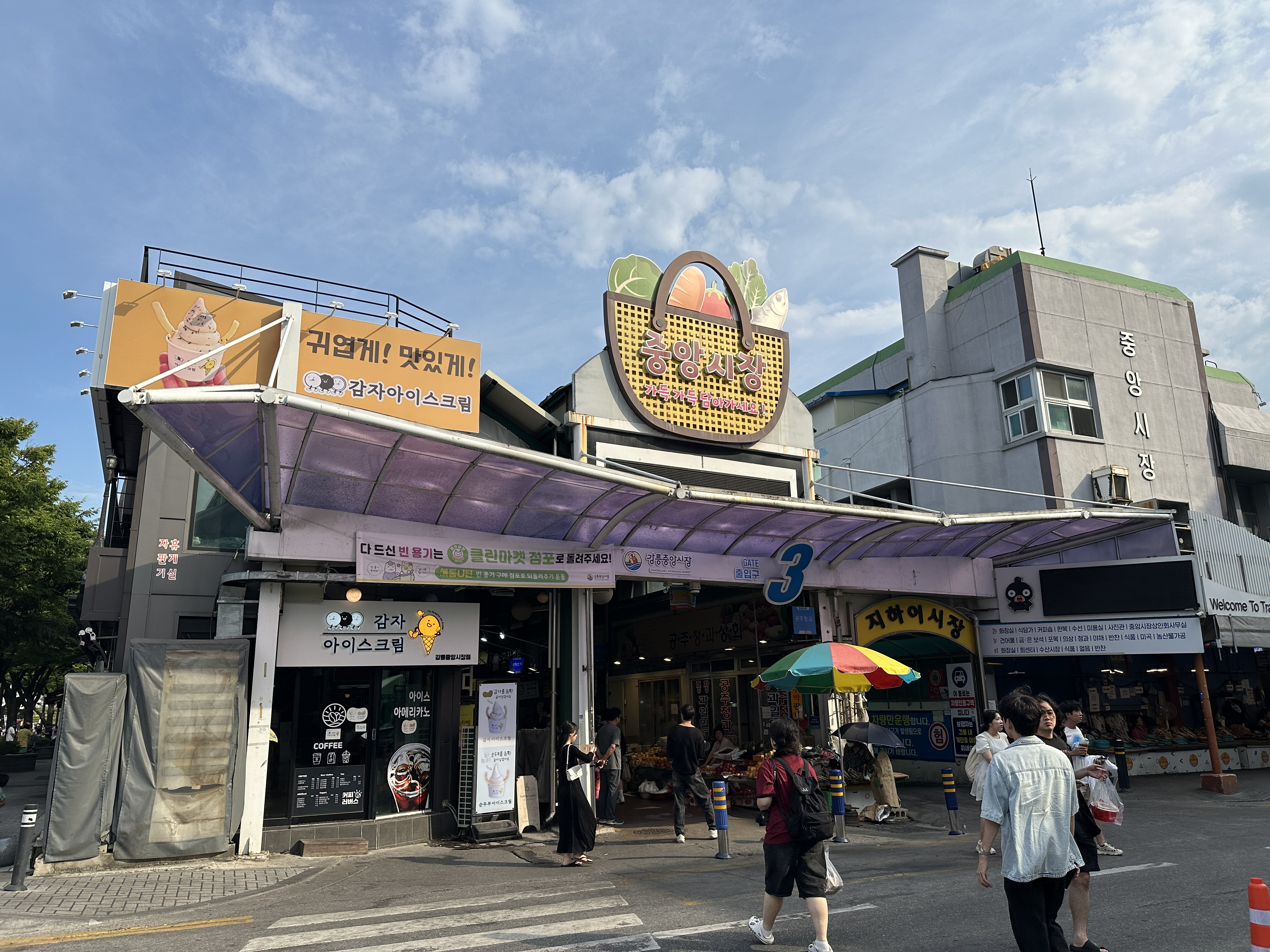
- One of the market entrances (2026)
- Coordinates: 37.7539°N 128.8986°E
- Website: gnmarket.or.kr

Korean name
- Hangul: 강릉중앙시장
- Hanja: 江陵中央市場
- RR: Gangneung jungang sijang
- MR: Kangnŭng chungang sijang

Gangneung Joongang Market (Korean: 강릉중앙시장), also spelled Gangneung Jungang Market, is a traditional market in Gangneung, South Korea. It was first established in 1980.

The market is famous for its sundae (sausage) with squid casing (오징어순대; ojingeo-sundae). In 2026, the market experienced one of the largest year-on-year growths in sales among all traditional markets in South Korea.

== Gallery ==
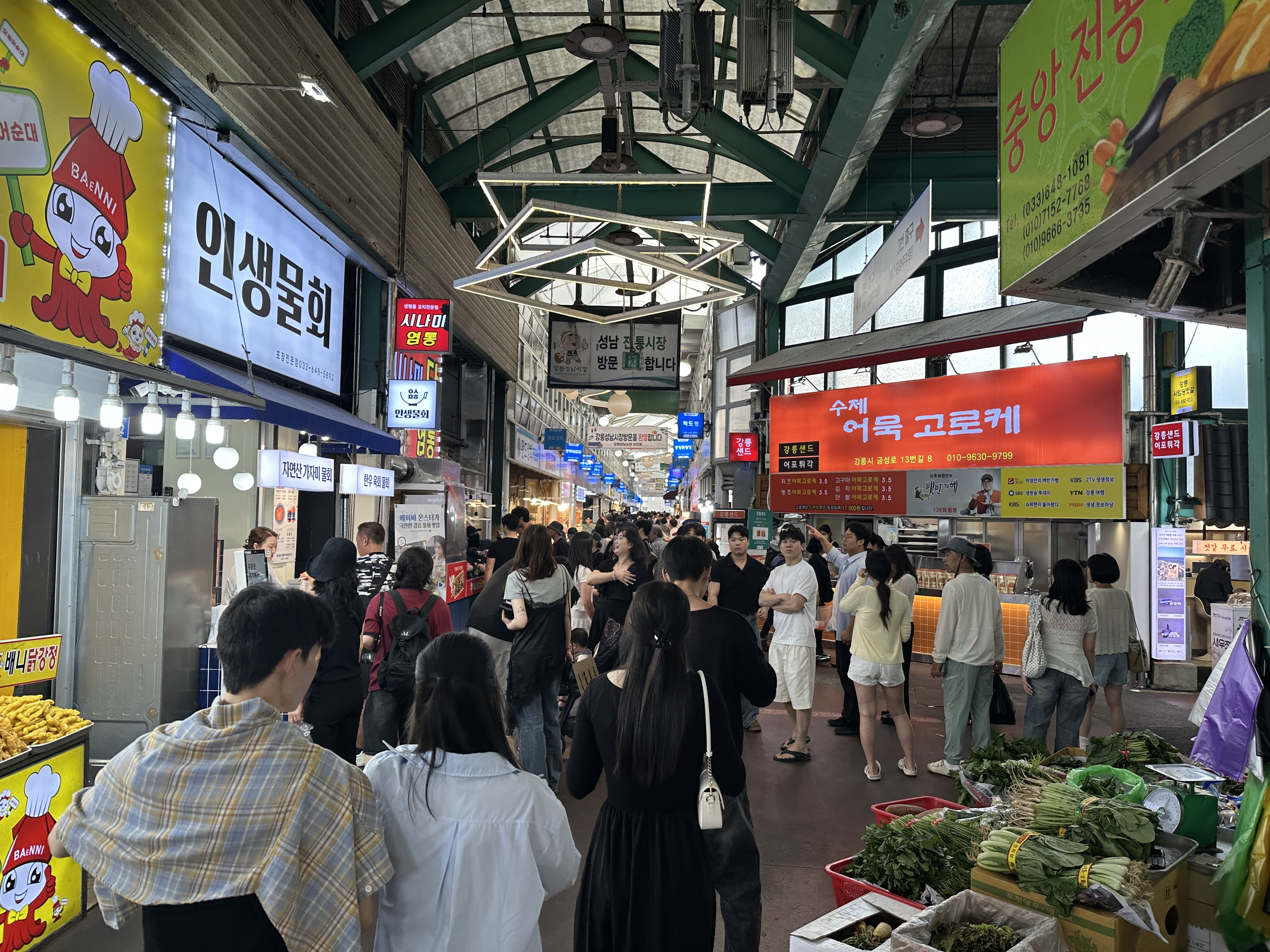
Inside the market (2026)

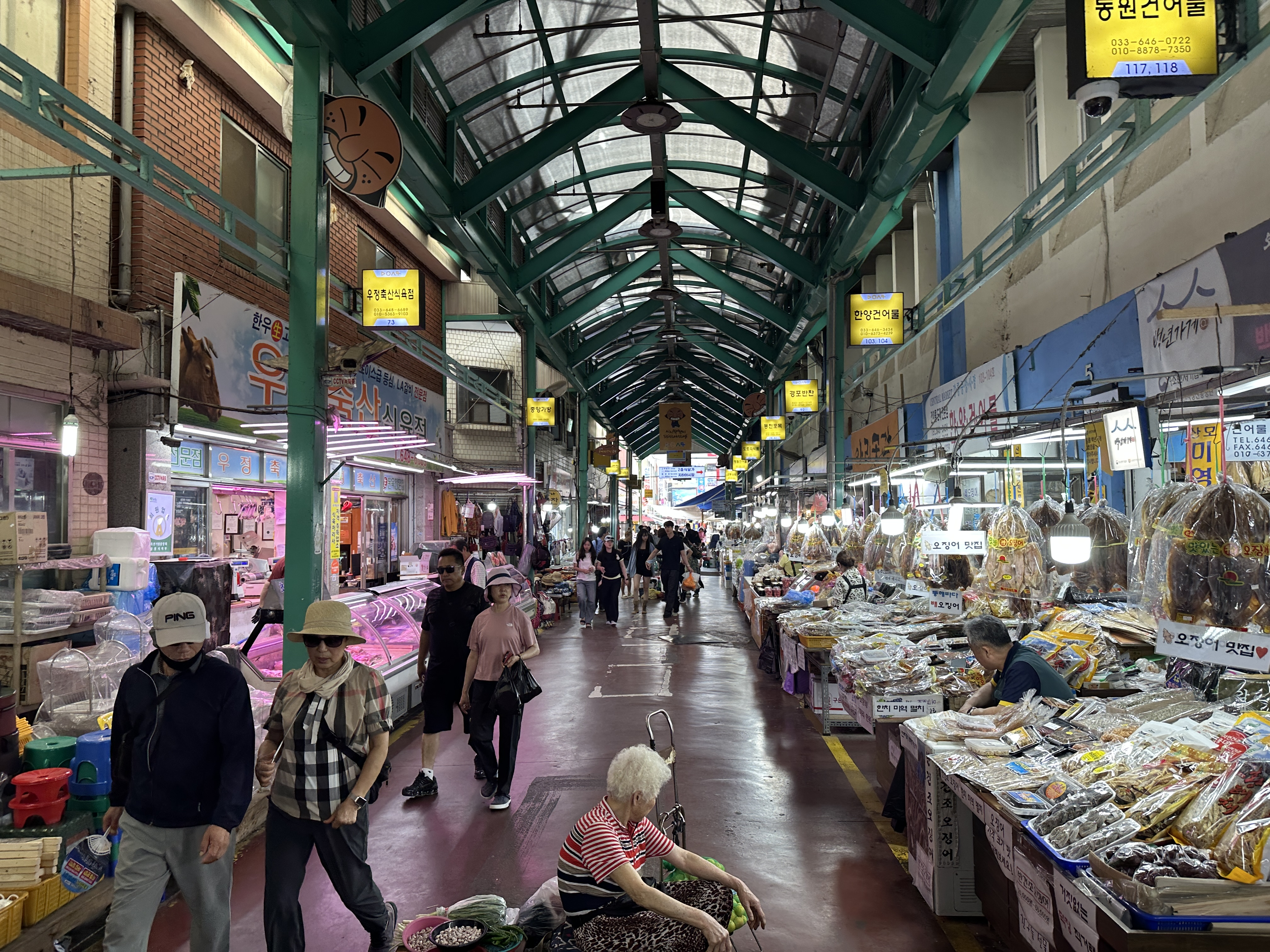
Inside the market (2026)
