= Jjolmyeon =

Korean noodle dish

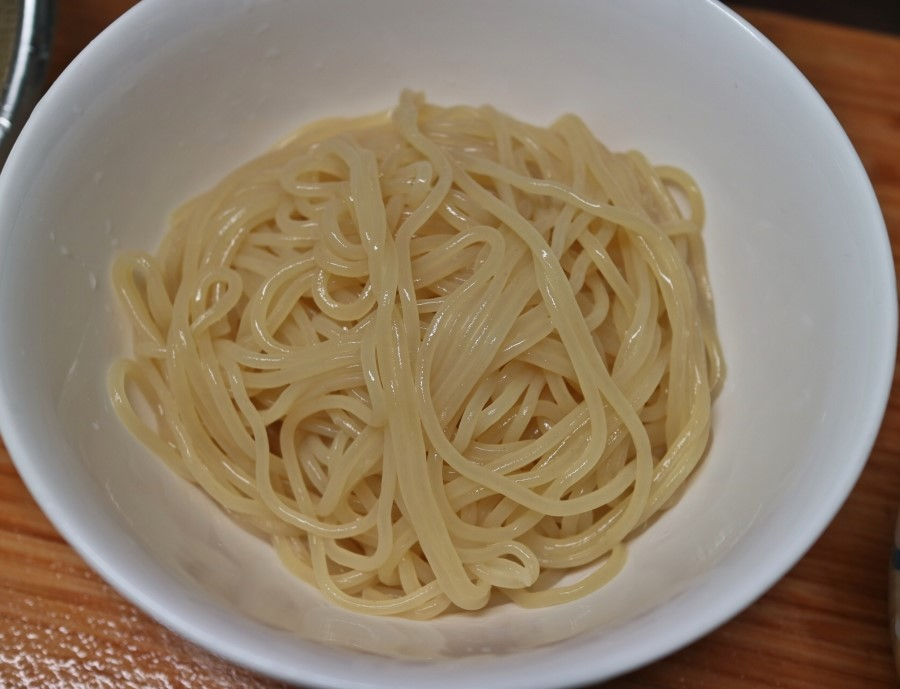
- A bowl of boiled jjolmyeon
- Type: Korean noodles
- Place of origin: Korea
- Region or state: Incheon
- Serving temperature: cold
- Main ingredients: Noodles (wheat flour, corn starch), sauce (gochujang, vinegar, sugar (optional), garlic), vegetables

Korean name
- Hangul: 쫄면
- Hanja: 쫄麵
- RR: jjolmyeon
- MR: tcholmyŏn

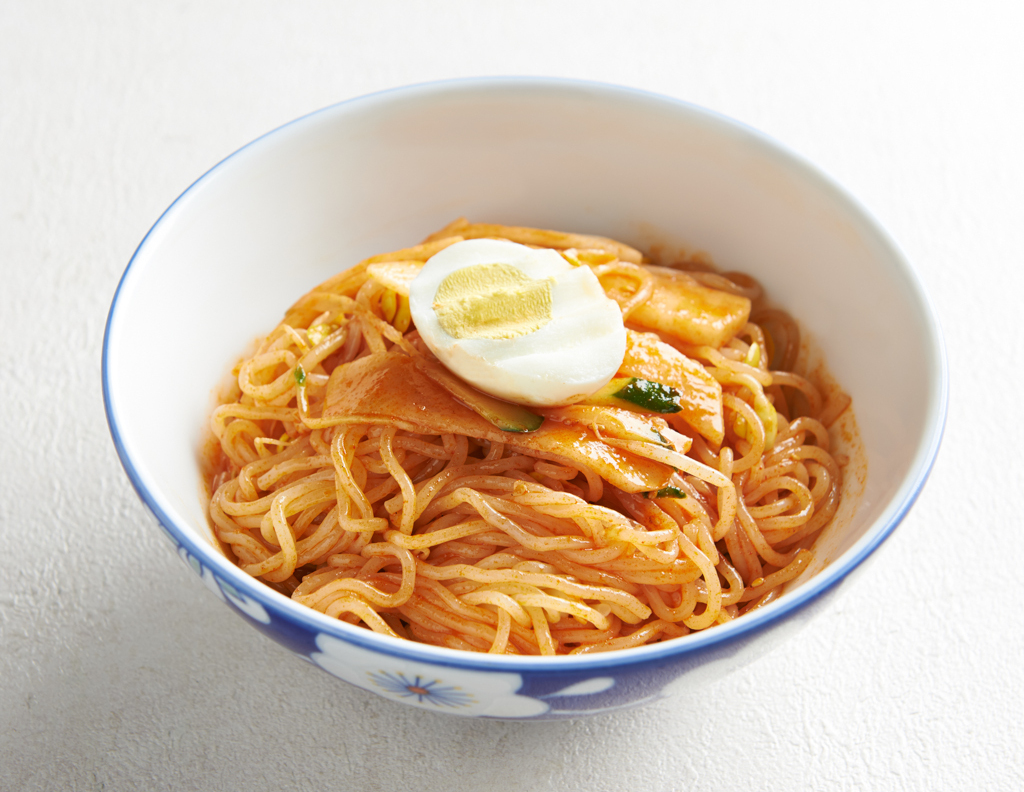
A bowl of bibim-jjolmyeon (mixed chewy noodles)

Jjolmyeon (Korean: 쫄면) is either a type of Korean noodle with a very chewy texture made from wheat flour and starch, or a cold and spicy dish bibim-jjolmyeon (비빔쫄면) made with the noodles and vegetables. Jjolmyeon can add many vegetables such as cabbage and bean sprouts. The spicy and hot sauce is a combination of gochujang (chili pepper paste), vinegar, sugar, and minced garlic. It is also a type of bibim guksu (mixed noodles).

The chewy texture of jjolmyeon noodles owes to its manufacturing process in which the dough is heated to 130-150 degrees Celsius and extruded by a machine under high pressure, in a manner similar to rice cake production.

== Etymology ==
The first syllable of the name comes from the sound symbolism jjolgit-jjolgit (쫄깃쫄깃) in Korean, which means "chewy", while myeon is a Hanja word meaning "noodles". Thus, the name literally means "chewy noodles".

== History ==
Jjolmyeon is one of the most popular noodle dishes in South Korea, especially among young people at bunsikjeom (Korean snack restaurants). It is a representative dish of Incheon, where jjolmyeon originated in the early 1970s by a mistake made while making naengmyeon. Noodles larger than regular naengmyeon noodles were made at a factory and instead of being thrown out, were given away to a nearby bunsikjeom. The owner mixed the noodles with gochujang sauce and jjolmyeon was born.

== See also ==
- Korean noodles
