= Ham Yon-ji =

South Korean businesswoman (born 1992)

- 함연지
- Born: 8 May 1992 (age 33); Seoul, South Korea
- Education: New York University (AB)
- Occupations: Businesswoman; actress
- Years active: 2015-present

Korean name
- Hangul: 함연지
- RR: Ham Yeonji
- MR: Ham Yŏnji

Ham Yon-ji (Korean: 함연지; born 8 May 1992) is a South Korean businesswoman and former actress. She is the eldest granddaughter of Ham Tae-ho, the founder of South Korean food processing company Ottogi.

== Early life and education ==
Ham attended Daewon Foreign Language High School and majored in acting at the New York University Tisch School of the Arts.

== Career ==
=== Media ===
Ham began her acting career in 2015, acting as Scarlett O’Hara in a French musical version of Gone with the Wind. She has since performed in various theater productions, including Amadeus and Notre-Dame de Paris. In 2019, Ham launched a YouTube channel, where she published vlogs, cooking content, and song covers.

=== Ottogi ===
In 2024, she began working as an intern at Ottogi America. Ham owns approximately 1 percent of the company.
