= Sundae (sausage) =

Korean blood sausage

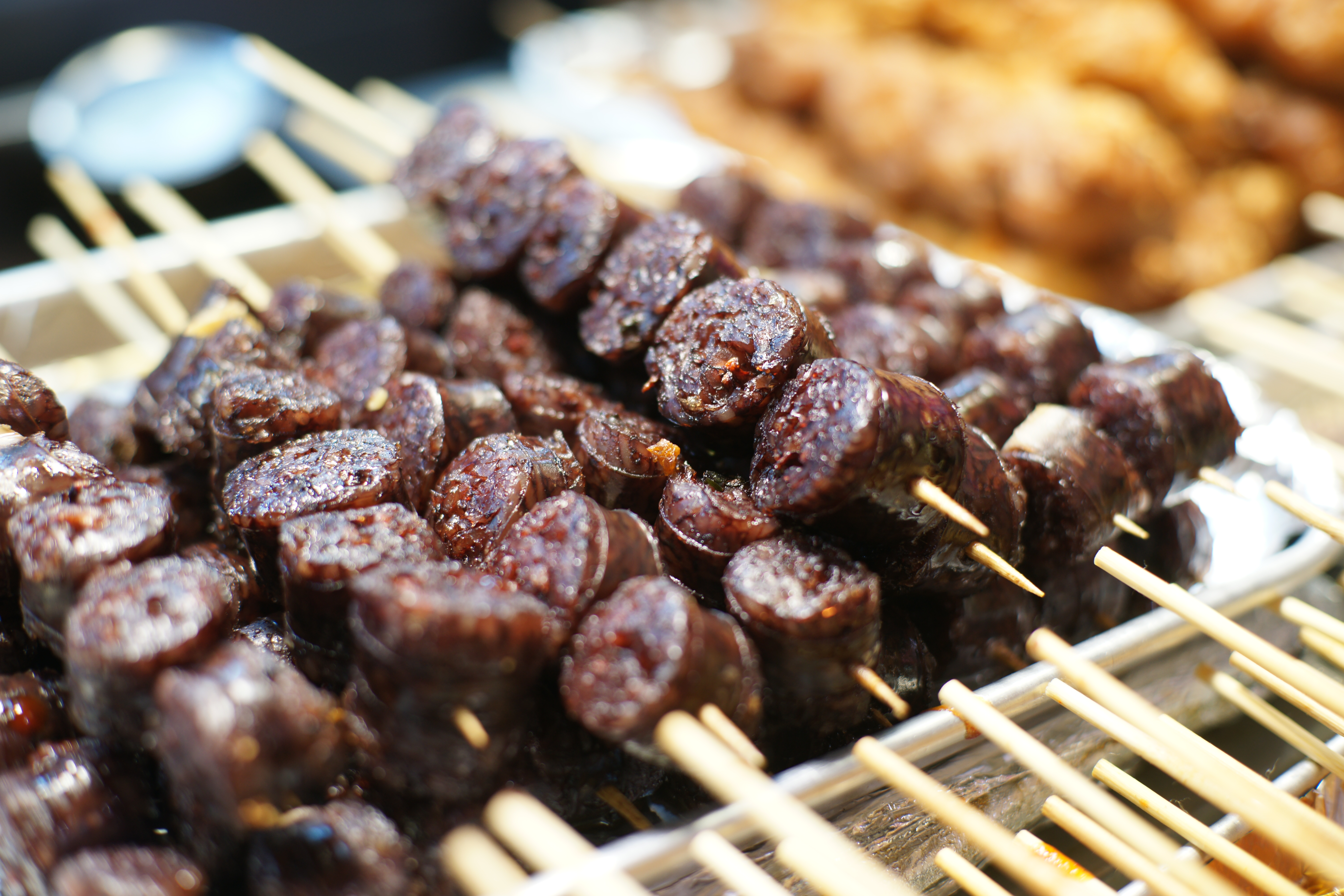
- Type: Blood sausage
- Course: Street food
- Place of origin: Korea
- Associated cuisine: Korean cuisine

Korean name
- Hangul: 순대
- RR: sundae
- MR: sundae
- IPA: [sun.dɛ]

Sundae (Korean: 순대; pronounced [sun.dɛ], sometimes anglicized as soondae) is a type of blood sausage in Korean cuisine. It is a popular street food in both North and South Korea, generally made by steaming cow or pig's intestines stuffed with various ingredients.

== History ==
The sundae sausage dates back to the Goryeo period (918–1392), when wild boars, prominent across the Korean Peninsula, were used in the dish. Recipes for sundae are found in nineteenth century cookbooks including Gyuhap chongseo and Siuijeonseo. The Siuijeonseo itself is where sundae is first attested in an early or Middle Korean form 슌ᄃᆡ /sjuntʌi/ annotated as an abbreviation of 성기 두하 /səŋgi duha/, a Manchu loan (lit. 'blood intestines').

Traditional sundae, cow or pig intestines stuffed with seonji (blood), minced meats, rice, and vegetables, was an indulgent food consumed during special occasions, festivities and large family gatherings. After the Korean War, when meat was scarce during the period of post-war poverty, dangmyeon replaced meat fillings in South Korea. sundae became an inexpensive street snack sold in bunsikjip (snack bars), pojangmacha (street stalls), and traditional markets.

== Recipe ==
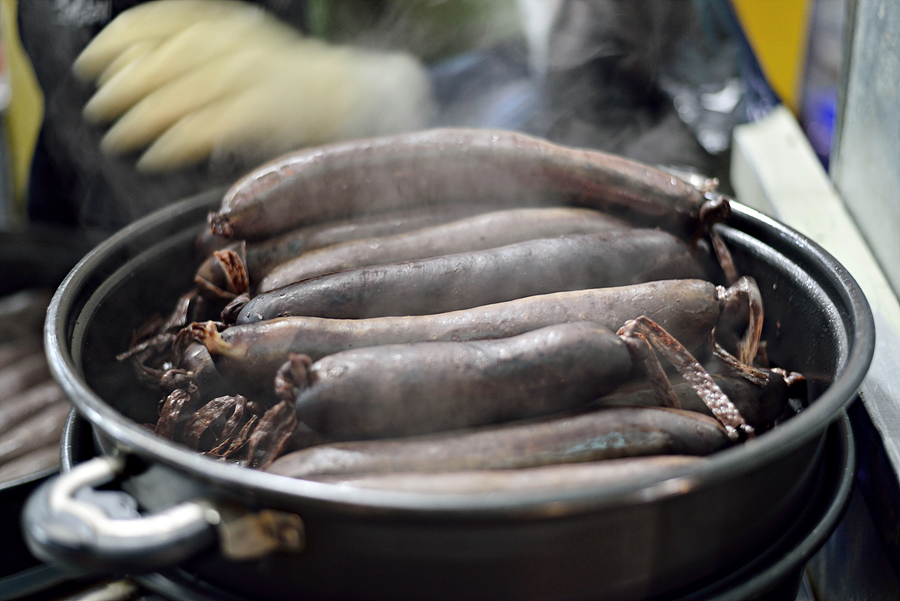
Steaming sundae

The skin of sundae is made by rubbing the pig intestines with salt and flour to get rid of the smell. When flipping the trimmed pig intestines, the clean side is exposed to the outside. Put pork skin in it along with tofu, bean sprouts, glutinous rice, and various spices. The sundae made in this way is steamed in a cauldron.

== Varieties ==
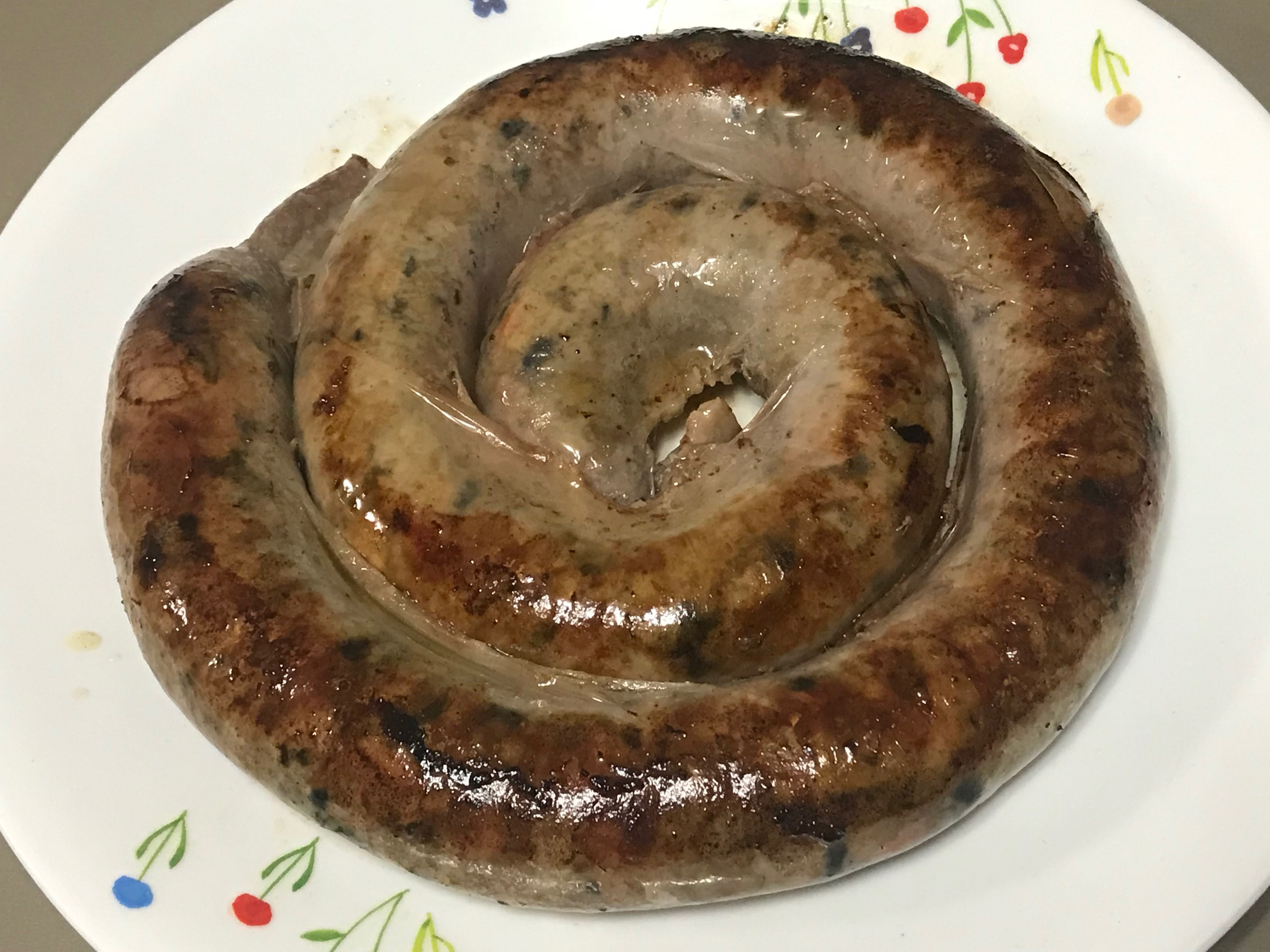
Uncut sundae

Traditional South Korean varieties, as well as all North Korean, Russian Korean (Koryo-saram and Sakhalin Korean), and Chinese Korean sundae fillings include seonji (blood), minced meat, rice, and vegetables. Modern South Korean bunsik (snack food) varieties often use dangmyeon (glass noodles) instead of meat, rice, and vegetables. Other fillings include kkaennip (perilla leaves), scallions, doenjang (soybean paste), kimchi, and soybean sprouts.

Regional varieties include abai-sundae (아바이순대) from the Hamgyong and Pyongan Provinces, Kaesong-sundae (개성순대) from Kaesong, Baegam-sundae (백암순대) from Yongin, Jeju-sundae (제주순대) from Jeju Island, Byeongcheon-sundae (병천순대) from Chungcheong Province, and amppong-sundae (암뽕순대) from Jeolla Province.

Some varieties use seafood as casing. Ojingeo-sundae (오징어순대), made with fresh squid, is a local specialty of Gangwon, while mareun-ojingeo-sundae (마른오징어순대) made with dried squid is eaten in Gangwon as well as Gyeonggi. Myeongtae-sundae (명태순대), made with Alaska pollock is a local specialty of Gangwon and Hamgyong. Eogyo-sundae (어교순대) is made with the swim bladder of brown croakers.

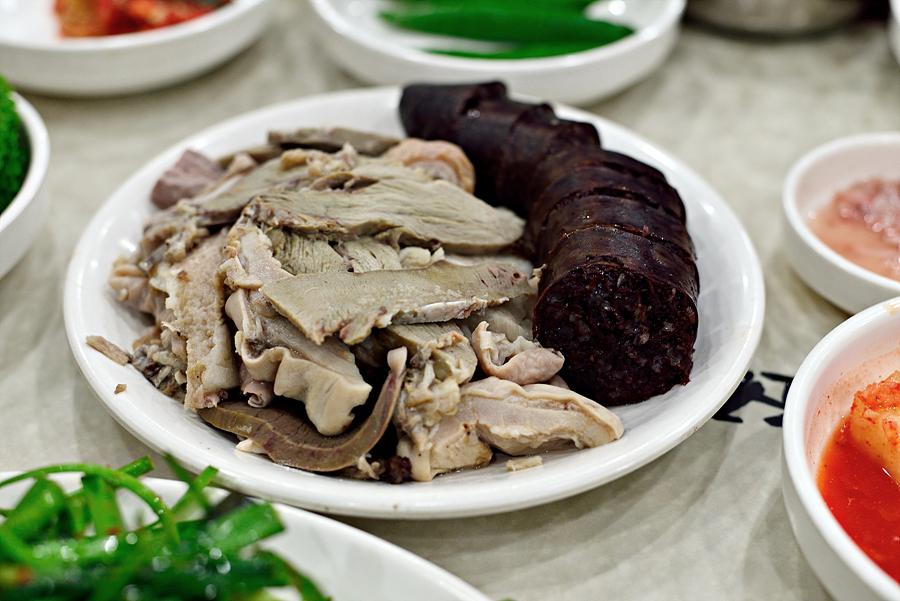
Traditional sundae (blood sausage) served with steamed offal

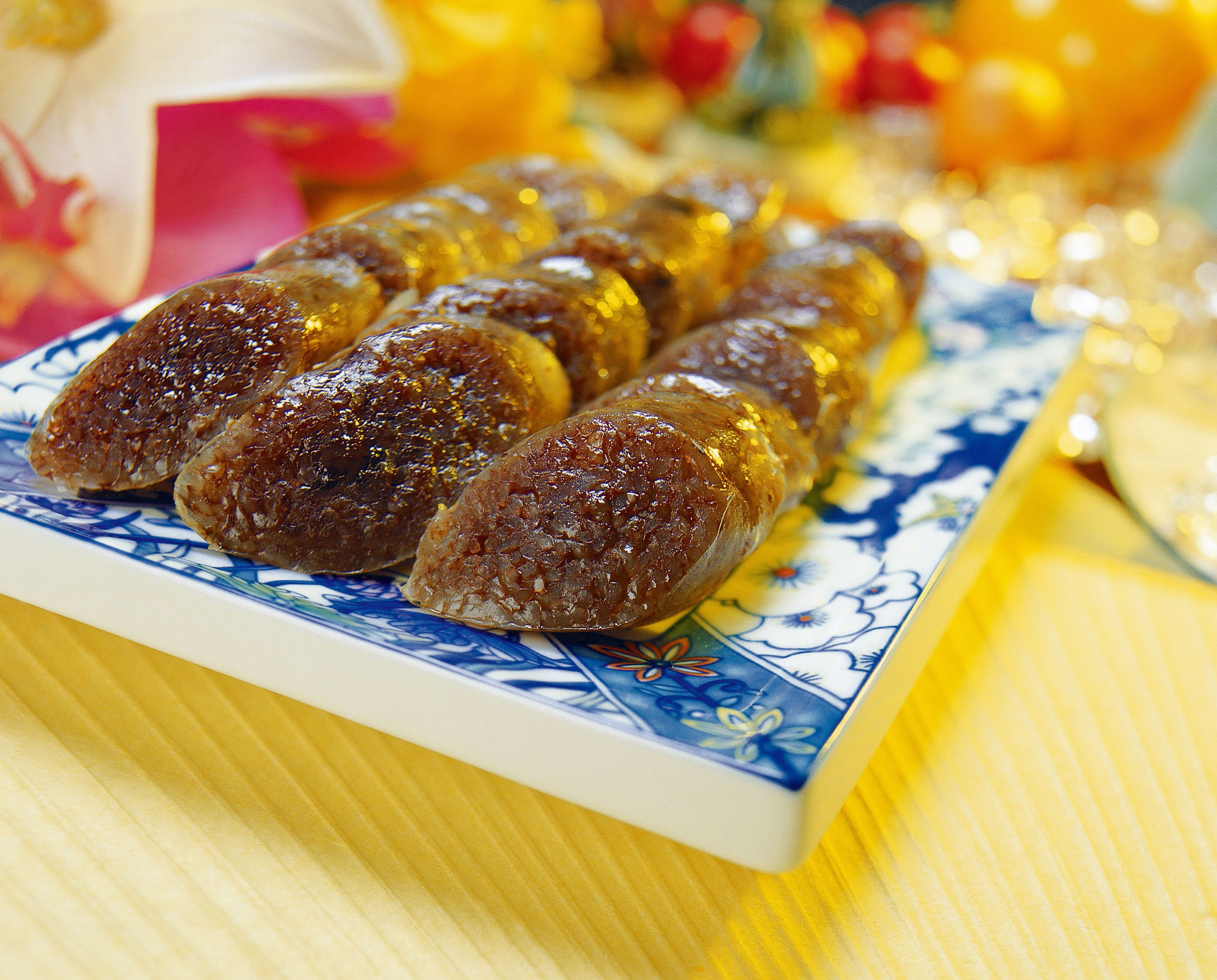
Bunsik-style sundae stuffed with dangmyeon (cellophane noodles)

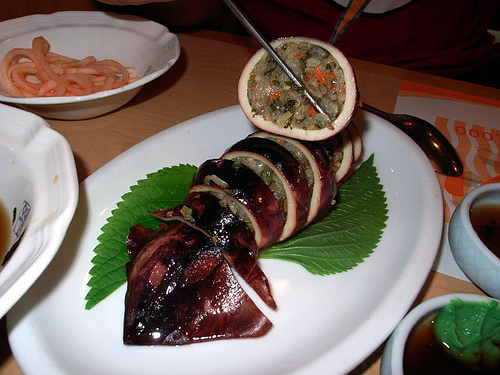
Ojingeo-sundae (squid sundae)

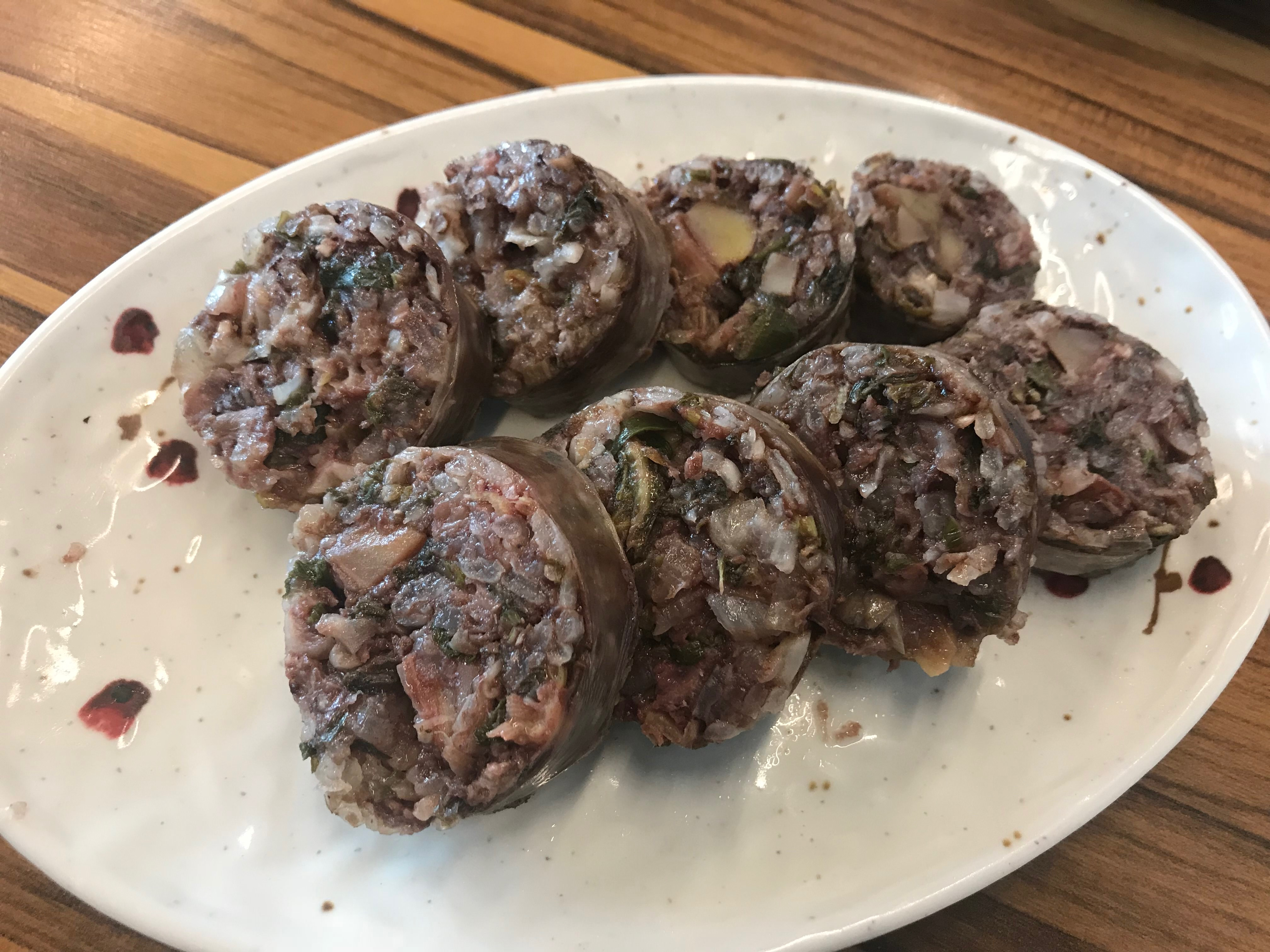
Abai-sundae

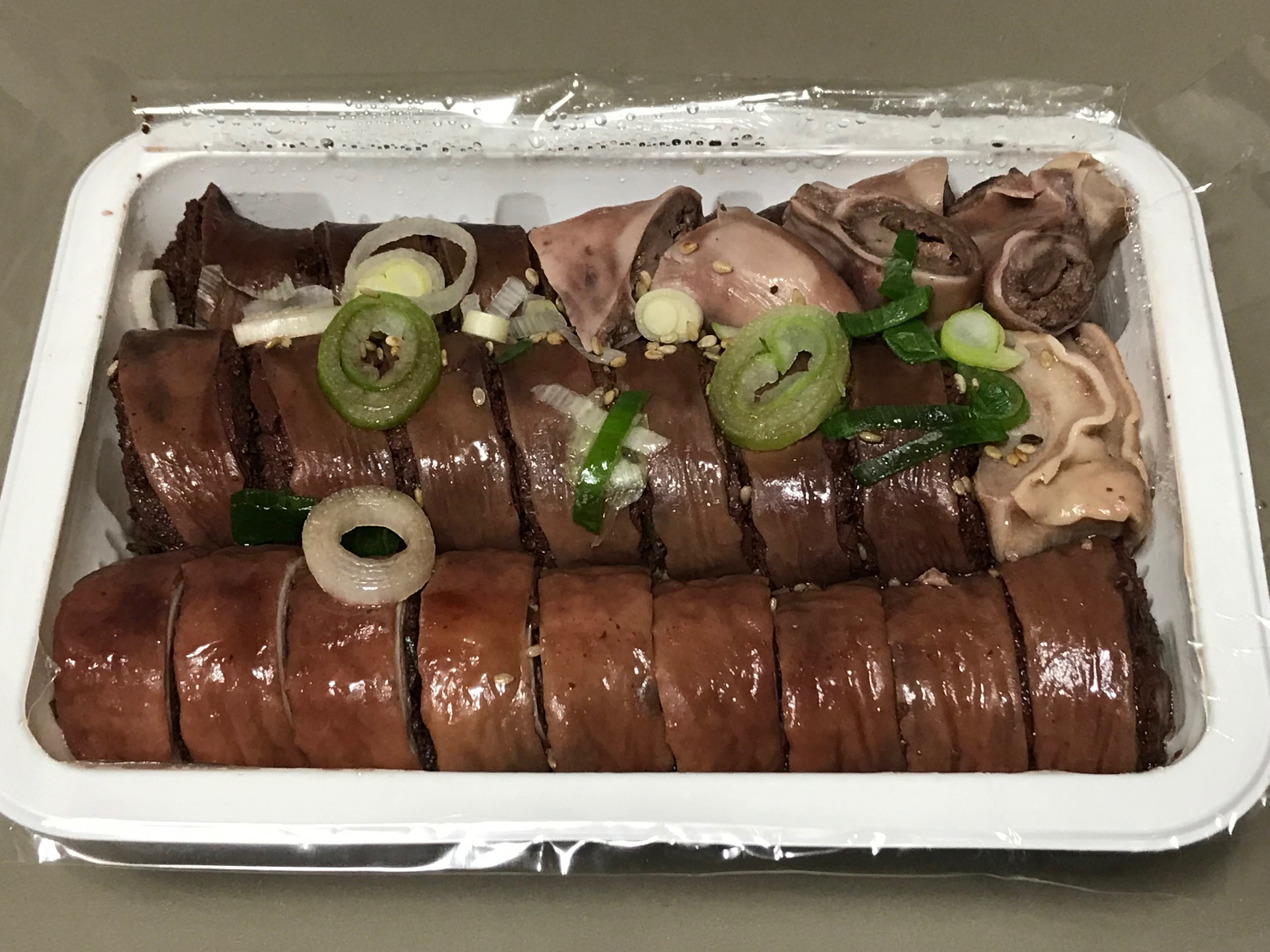
Blood sundae

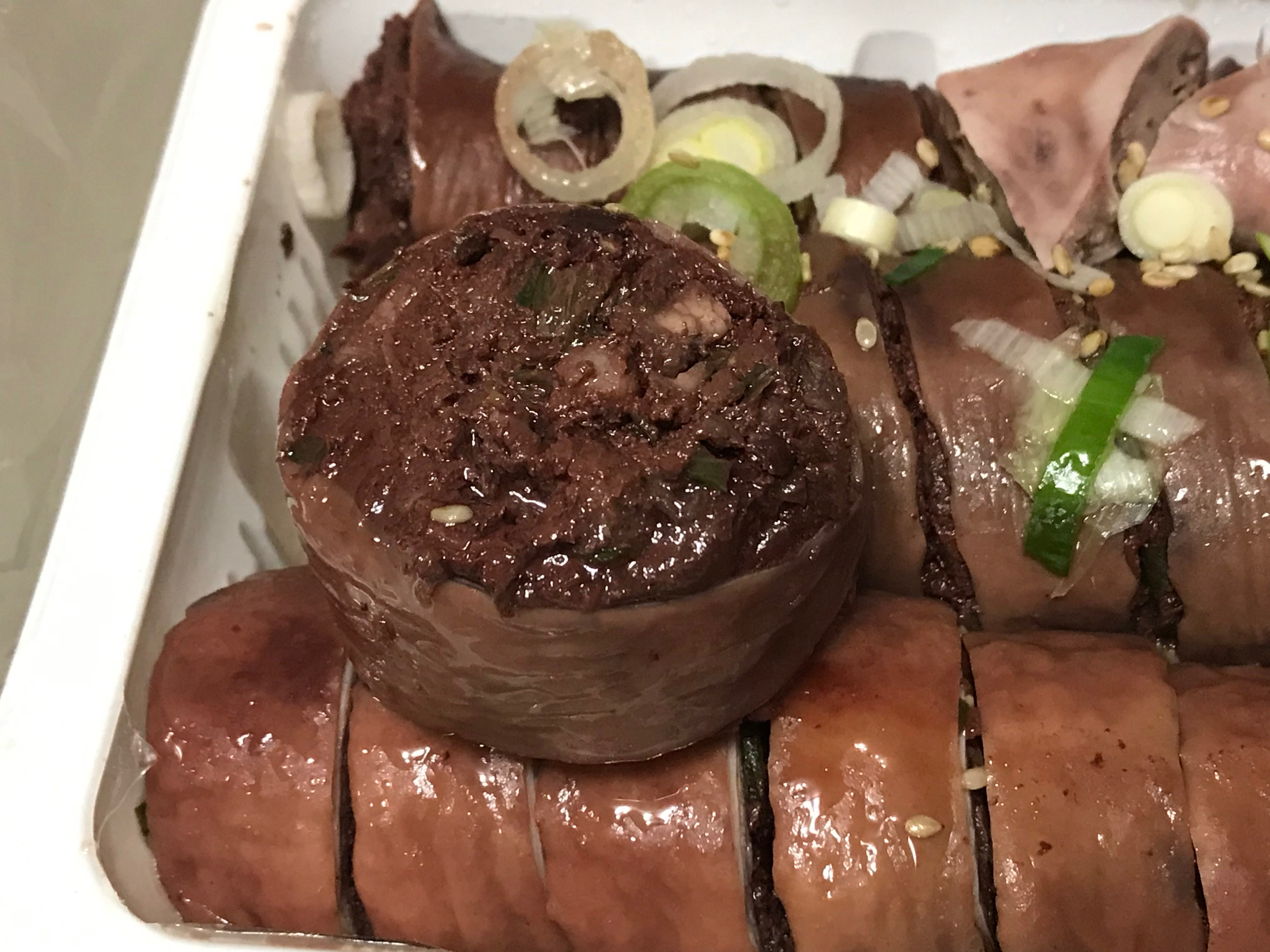

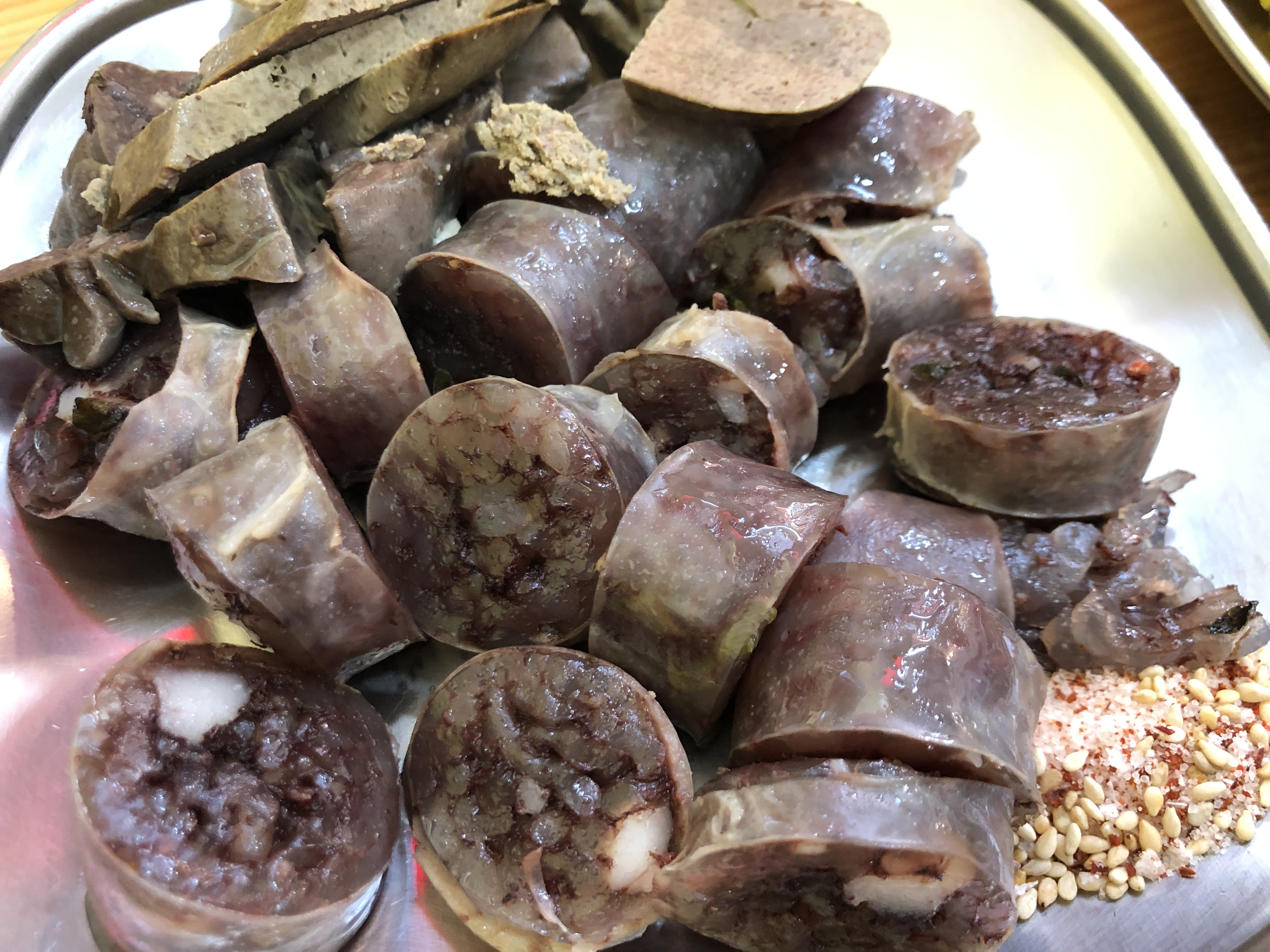

== Accompaniments ==
In South Korea, sundae is often steamed and served with steamed offal such as gan (liver) and heopa (lung). Sliced pieces of sundae and sides are dipped in salt-black pepper mixture (Seoul), in vinegar-gochujang mixture (Honam), seasoned soybean paste in Yeongnam, and soy sauce in Jeju. Sundae is sold a lot at guk-bap restaurants or bunsikjip (snack bars). As sundae is often sold in bunsikjip, along with tteok-bokki (stir-fried rice cakes) and twigim (fritters), it is also dipped in tteok-bokki sauce. Many bunsikjip offer tteok-twi-sun, a set menu with tteok-bokki, twigim and sundae.

== Sundae dishes ==
- Sundae-guk (순대국) – a guk (soup) made with sundae, other offal, and meat.
- Sundae-bokkeum (순대볶음) – a bokkeum (stir-fry) made with sundae, vegetables, and gochujang.
- Baek-sundae-bokkeum (백순대볶음) – a sundae-bokkeum without gochujang.
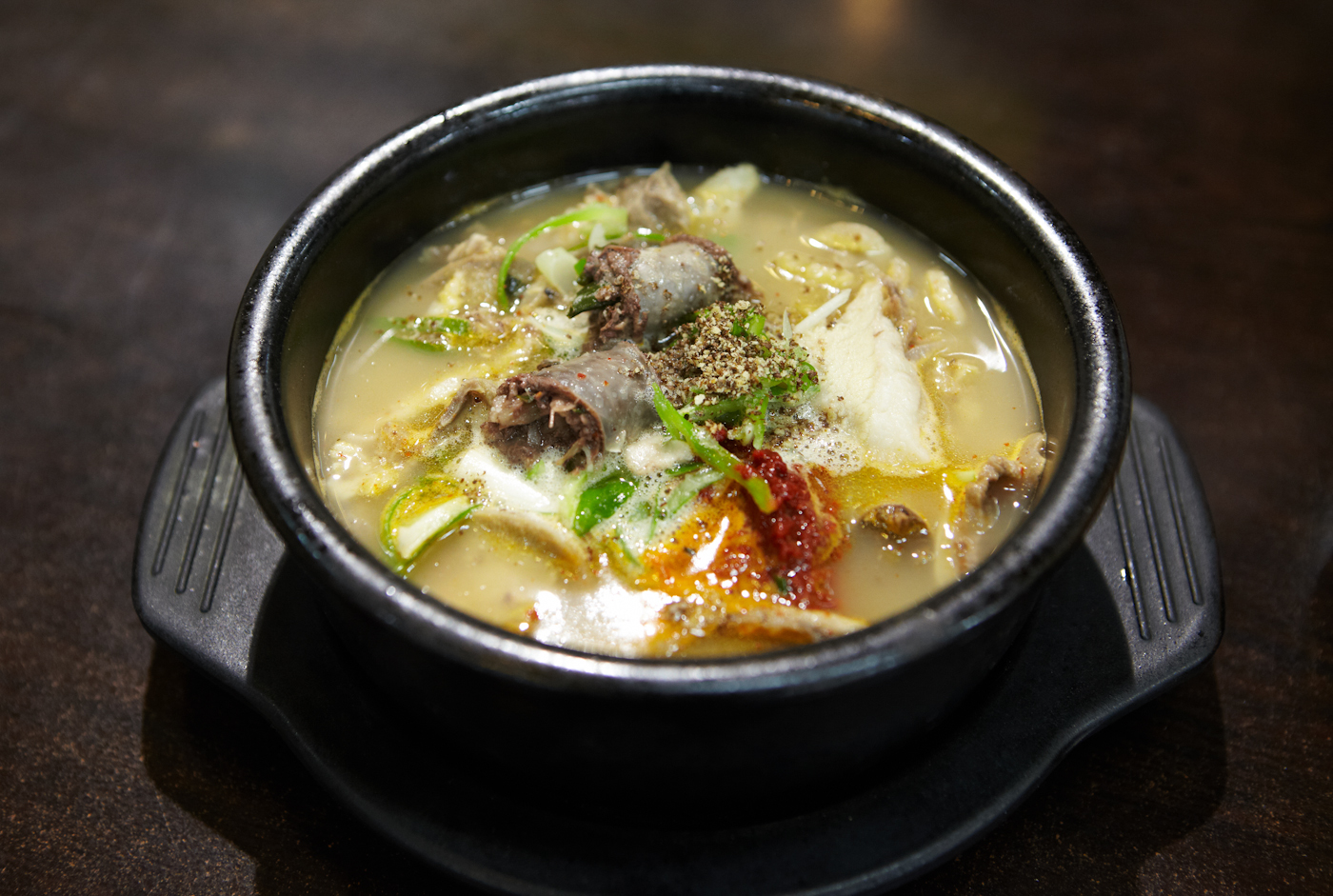
Sundae-guk (blood sausage soup) served in ttukbaegi

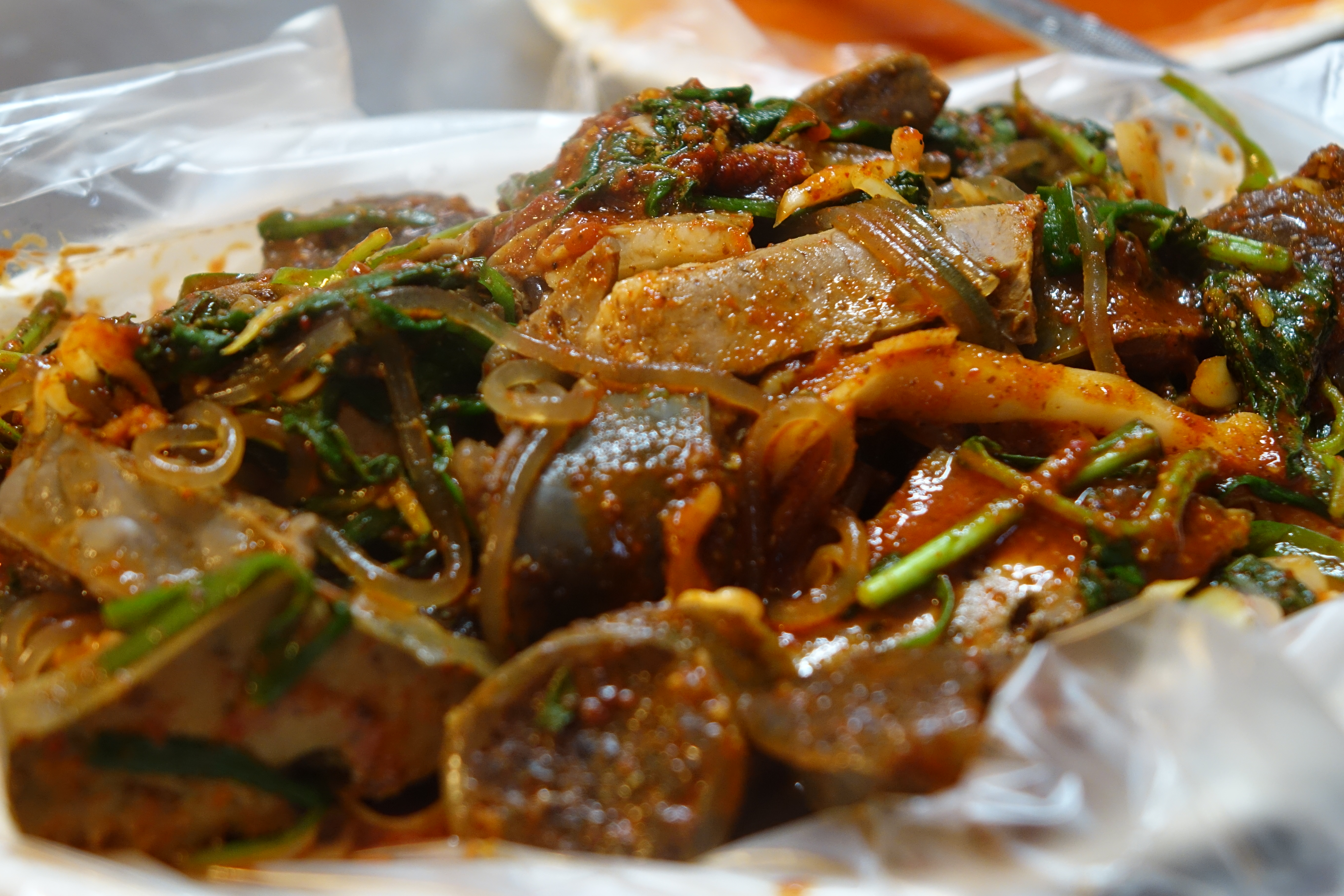
Sundae-bokkeum (stir-fried blood sausage with vegetables)

== See also ==
- Black pudding
- Gyurma
- Haggis
- Kaszanka
- Qazı
- List of sausages
