= Siŭijŏnsŏ =

Late 19th-century Korean cookbook

- Hangul: 시의전서
- Hanja: 是議全書
- RR: Siuijeonseo
- MR: Siŭijŏnsŏ
- IPA: [ɕi.ɰi.dʑʌn.sʌ]

Siŭijŏnsŏ (Korean: 시의전서; Hanja: 是議全書) is an anonymous Korean cookbook believed to have been compiled in the late nineteenth century, during the late Joseon period. The surviving manuscript is a copy transcribed around 1919 by Sim Hwanjin, then the governor of Sangju, and subsequently passed to his daughter-in-law, Hong Chŏng; the original manuscript has not been located.

The manuscript consists of two parts bound into a single volume and documents a wide range of traditional Korean cuisine and preparation methods. Its contents also include illustrated arrangements of traditional Korean table settings. One of its best-known entries is a historical recipe for bibimbap, recorded under the names koltongban (골동반) and pubimpap (부븸밥).
