= Bunsik =

Type of Korean dish

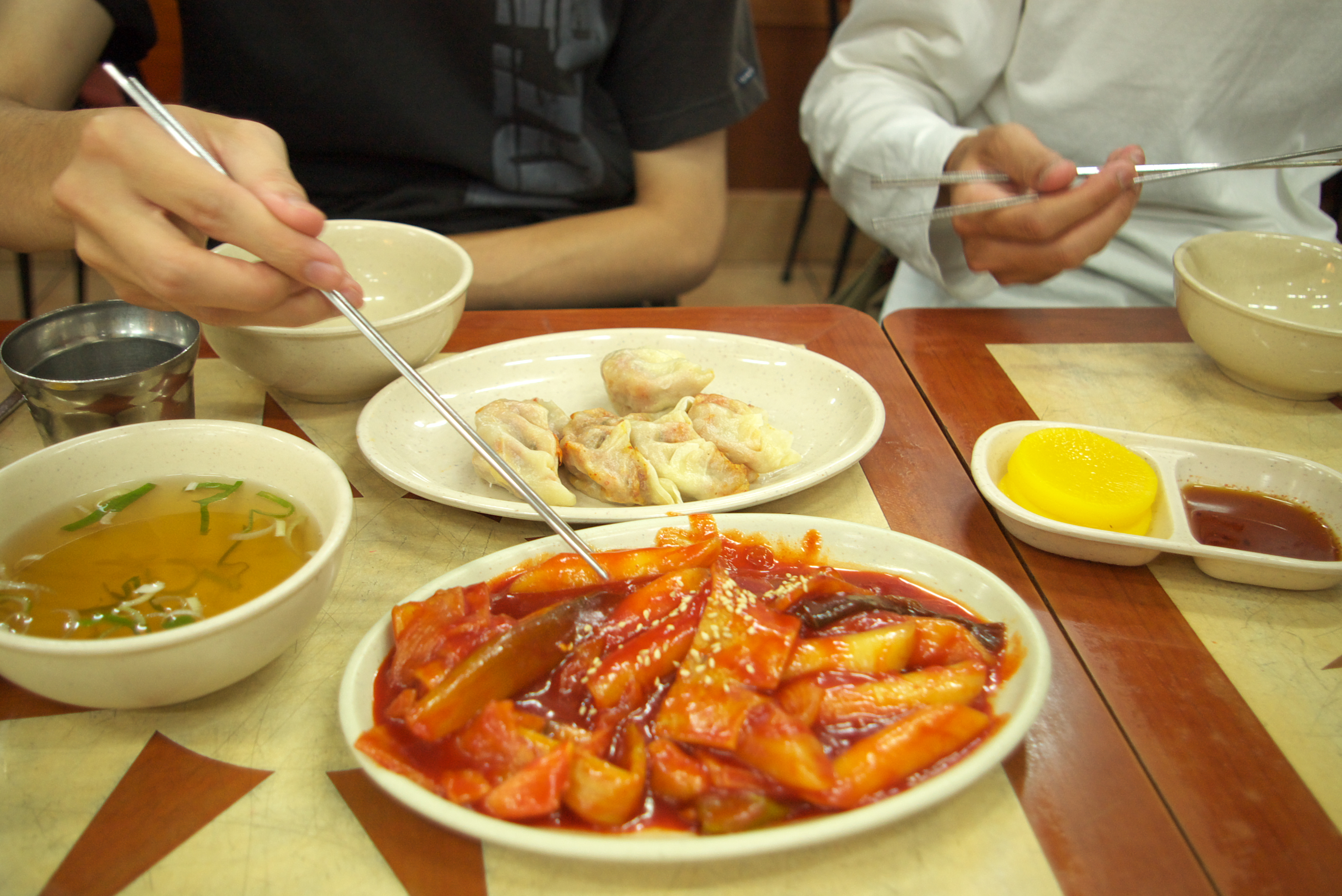

Korean name
- Hangul: 분식
- Hanja: 粉食
- RR: bunsik
- MR: punsik
- IPA: pun.ɕik̚

In Korean cuisine, bunsik (Korean: 분식) are inexpensive dishes available at bunsikjeom (분식점) or bunsikjip (분식집) snack restaurants. Bunsik literally means "food made from flour," referring to dishes such as ramyeon (라면; noodle soup) and bread, but modern bunsik restaurants serve other dishes in large portions at low prices, such as gimbap, tteokbokki, rabokki (tteokbokki with ramyeon), sundae, eomuk, and twigim. One bunsikjip chain is called "Gimbap Cheonguk".

== History ==
During the 1960s, rice was scarce in South Korea, and the government was prompted to promote bunsik as an alternative. Committees were set up in each region to encourage public organizations, schools, and government offices to lead the movement. Restaurants were guided to use more barley and wheat flour while sales of rice-based foods were banned on certain days of the week. Government run restaurants in official buildings were banned from selling rice dishes altogether. This effort lasted until 1976.
