= List of awards and nominations received by 2 Days & 1 Night =

2 Days & 1 Night awards and nominations
Awards and nominations
Award	Wins	Nominations
KBS Entertainment Awards	63	81
Baeksang Arts Awards	2	7
Korea Broadcasting Prizes	5	5
Korea Entertainment Art Awards	2	2
Korean PD Awards	2	2
Korean Broadcasters' Awards	1	1
Brand Customer Loyalty Awards	1	1

Totals (Note: Certain award groups do not simply award one winner. They acknowledge several different recipients, have runners-up, and have third place. Since this is a specific recognition and is different from losing an award, runner-up mentions are considered wins in this award tally. For simplification and to avoid errors, each award in this list has been presumed to have had a prior nomination.)
- Wins: 76
- Nominations: 99

This is a list of awards and nominations received by South Korean reality-variety show 2 Days & 1 Night.

== KBS Entertainment Awards ==
Season	Year	Award	Category	Recipient	Result	Ref
Season 1	2007	6th KBS Entertainment Awards	Best Entertainer Award	Lee Soo-geun	Won	
Season 1	2007	6th KBS Entertainment Awards	Top Excellence Idea Corner Award	2 Days & 1 Night Season 1	Won	
Season 1	2008	7th KBS Entertainment Awards	Grand Prize (Daesang)	Kang Ho-dong	Won	
Season 1	2008	7th KBS Entertainment Awards	Best Variety Show Writer	Lee Woo-jung	Won	
Season 1	2008	7th KBS Entertainment Awards	Best Newcomer in a Variety Show	Lee Soo-geun	Won	
Season 1	2008	7th KBS Entertainment Awards	Top Popularity Award	Lee Seung-gi	Won	
Season 1	2008	7th KBS Entertainment Awards	Viewer's Choice Program	Happy Sunday	Won	
Season 1	2009	8th KBS Entertainment Awards	Grand Prize (Daesang)	Kang Ho-dong	Won	
Season 1	2009	8th KBS Entertainment Awards	Excellence Award, Male MC in a Variety Show	Lee Soo-geun	Won	
Season 1	2009	8th KBS Entertainment Awards	Viewer's Choice Program	Happy Sunday	Won	
Season 1	2010	9th KBS Entertainment Awards	Top Entertainer Award	Eun Jiwon	Won	
Season 1	2010	9th KBS Entertainment Awards	Excellence Award, Male MC in a Variety Show	Lee Soo-geun	Won	
Season 1	2010	9th KBS Entertainment Awards	Top Excellence Award, Male MC in a Variety Show	Lee Seung-gi	Won	
Season 1	2010	9th KBS Entertainment Awards	Viewer's Choice Program	Happy Sunday	Won	
Season 1	2011	10th KBS Entertainment Awards	Grand Prize (Daesang)	Lee Soo-geun; Lee Seung-gi; Eun Jiwon; Kim Jong-min; Uhm Tae-woong	Won	
Season 1	2011	10th KBS Entertainment Awards	Top Entertainer Award	Uhm Tae-woong	Won	
Season 1	2011	10th KBS Entertainment Awards	Top Excellence, Male MC in a Variety Show	Lee Soo-geun	Won	
Season 1	2011	10th KBS Entertainment Awards	Distinguished Services Award	Kang Chan-hee (VJ)	Won	
Season 2	2012	11th KBS Entertainment Awards	Grand Prize (Daesang)	Lee Soo-geun	Nominated	
Season 2	2012	11th KBS Entertainment Awards	Best Variety Show Writer	Choi Jae-yeong	Won	
Season 2	2012	11th KBS Entertainment Awards	Best Newcomer in a Variety Show	Joo Won	Won	
Season 2	2012	11th KBS Entertainment Awards	Top Entertainer Award	Cha Tae-hyun	Won	
Season 2	2012	11th KBS Entertainment Awards	Top Excellence Award, Male MC in a Variety Show	Kim Seung-woo	Won	
Season 3	2013	12th KBS Entertainment Awards	Grand Prize	Kim Jun-ho	Won	
Season 3	2013	12th KBS Entertainment Awards	Male Top Excellence Award	Cha Tae-hyun	Won	
Season 3	2014	13th KBS Entertainment Awards	Grand Prize (Daesang)	Cha Tae-hyun	Nominated	
Season 3	2014	13th KBS Entertainment Awards	Grand Prize (Daesang)	Kim Jun-ho	Nominated	
Season 3	2014	13th KBS Entertainment Awards	Best Newcomer Award in a Variety Show	Kim Joo Hyuk	Won	
Season 3	2014	13th KBS Entertainment Awards	Top Entertainer Award in a Variety Show	Jung Joon-young	Won	
Season 3	2014	13th KBS Entertainment Awards	Male Excellence Award in a Variety Show	Defconn	Won	
Season 3	2015	14th KBS Entertainment Awards	Grand Prize (Daesang)	Cha Tae-hyun	Nominated	
Season 3	2015	14th KBS Entertainment Awards	Best Entertainer – Entertainment Category	Kim Joo Hyuk	Won	
Season 3	2015	14th KBS Entertainment Awards	High Excellence Award – Variety Category	Kim Jong-min	Won	
Season 3	2015	14th KBS Entertainment Awards	Viewers' Choice Best Program	2 Days & 1 Night Season 3	Won	
Season 3	2016	15th KBS Entertainment Awards	Grand Prize (Daesang)	Kim Jong-min	Won	
Season 3	2016	15th KBS Entertainment Awards	Grand Prize (Daesang)	Kim Jun-ho	Nominated	
Season 3	2016	15th KBS Entertainment Awards	Viewers' Choice Best Program	2 Days & 1 Night Season 3	Won	
Season 3	2016	15th KBS Entertainment Awards	Top Excellence Award, Male MC in a Variety Show	Defconn	Nominated	
Season 3	2016	15th KBS Entertainment Awards	Rookie Award in a Variety Show	Yoon Shi-yoon	Won	
Season 3	2016	15th KBS Entertainment Awards	Best Screenwriter Award	Jeong Seon-yeong	Won	
Season 3	2018	17th KBS Entertainment Awards	Viewers' Choice Best Program	2 Days & 1 Night Season 3	Won	
Season 3	2018	17th KBS Entertainment Awards	Best Couple Award	Kim Jun-ho & Kim Jong-min	Won	
Season 3	2018	17th KBS Entertainment Awards	Best Entertainer	Yoon Shi-yoon	Won	
Season 3	2018	17th KBS Entertainment Awards	Top Excellence Award, Male MC in a Variety Show	Defconn	Won	
Season 3	2018	17th KBS Entertainment Awards	Grand Prize (Daesang)	Kim Jun-ho	Nominated	
Season 4	2020	19th KBS Entertainment Awards	Rookie Award	Kim Seon-ho	Won	
Season 4	2020	19th KBS Entertainment Awards	Top Excellence Award, Variety	Moon Se-yoon	Won	
Season 4	2020	19th KBS Entertainment Awards	Excellence Award, Variety	DinDin	Won	
Season 4	2020	19th KBS Entertainment Awards	Viewers' Choice Best Program Award	2 Days & 1 Night Season 4	Won	
Season 4	2020	19th KBS Entertainment Awards	Best Entertainer	Yeon Jung-hoon	Won	
Season 4	2020	19th KBS Entertainment Awards	Grand Prize (Daesang)	Kim Jong-min	Nominated	
Season 4	2021	20th KBS Entertainment Awards	Rookie Award, Show/Variety Category	Ravi	Won	
Season 4	2021	20th KBS Entertainment Awards	Entertainer of the Year	Moon Se-yoon	Won	
Season 4	2021	20th KBS Entertainment Awards	Entertainer of the Year	Kim Jong-min	Won	
Season 4	2021	20th KBS Entertainment Awards	Viewers' Choice Best Program Award	2 Days & 1 Night Season 4	Won	
Season 4	2021	20th KBS Entertainment Awards	Broadcasting Screenwriter Award	Noh Jin-young	Won	
Season 4	2021	20th KBS Entertainment Awards	Excellence Award, Show/Variety Category	Yeon Jung-hoon	Won	
Season 4	2021	20th KBS Entertainment Awards	Top Excellence Award, Show/Variety Category	DinDin	Nominated	
Season 4	2021	20th KBS Entertainment Awards	Grand Prize (Daesang)	Moon Se-yoon	Won	
Season 4	2021	20th KBS Entertainment Awards	Grand Prize (Daesang)	Kim Jong-min	Nominated	
Season 4	2022	21st KBS Entertainment Awards	Rookie Award, Show/Variety Category	Na In-woo	Won	
Season 4	2022	21st KBS Entertainment Awards	Entertainer of the Year	Kim Jong-min	Won	
Season 4	2022	21st KBS Entertainment Awards	Best Entertainer Award	Yeon Jung-hoon	Won	
Season 4	2022	21st KBS Entertainment Awards	Viewers' Choice Best Program Award	2 Days & 1 Night Season 4	Nominated	
Season 4	2022	21st KBS Entertainment Awards	Excellence Award in Show/Variety Category	Yeon Jung-hoon	Nominated	
Season 4	2022	21st KBS Entertainment Awards	Top Excellence Award, Show/Variety Category	DinDin	Won	
Season 4	2023	22nd KBS Entertainment Awards	Rookie Award, Show/Variety Category	Yoo Seon-ho	Won	
Season 4	2023	22nd KBS Entertainment Awards	Excellence Award, Show/Variety Category	Na In-woo	Nominated	
Season 4	2023	22nd KBS Entertainment Awards	Top Excellence Award, Show/Variety Category	Yeon Jung-hoon	Nominated	
Season 4	2023	22nd KBS Entertainment Awards	Viewers' Choice Best Program Award	2 Days & 1 Night Season 4	Nominated	
Season 4	2023	22nd KBS Entertainment Awards	Broadcast Writer Award	Choi Hye-ran	Won	
Season 4	2023	22nd KBS Entertainment Awards	Entertainer of the Year	2 Days & 1 Night Season 4 Cast	Won	
Season 4	2023	22nd KBS Entertainment Awards	Grand Prize (Daesang)	Yeon Jung-hoon; Kim Jong-min; Moon Se-yoon; DinDin; Na In-woo; Yoo Seon-ho	Won	
Season 4	2024	23rd KBS Entertainment Awards	Grand Prize (Daesang)	Kim Jong-min	Nominated	
Season 4	2024	23rd KBS Entertainment Awards	Entertainer of the Year	Kim Jong-min	Won	
Season 4	2024	23rd KBS Entertainment Awards	Viewers' Choice Best Program Award	2 Days & 1 Night Season 4	Nominated	
Season 4	2024	23rd KBS Entertainment Awards	Top Excellence Award, Show/Variety Category	Jo Se-ho	Won	
Season 4	2024	23rd KBS Entertainment Awards	Top Excellence Award, Show/Variety Category	DinDin	Nominated	
Season 4	2024	23rd KBS Entertainment Awards	Excellence Award, Show/Variety Category	Lee Joon	Won	
Season 4	2024	23rd KBS Entertainment Awards	Producer Special Award	Kim Jong-min	Won	
Season 4	2024	23rd KBS Entertainment Awards	Best Teamwork	2 Days & 1 Night Season 4 Cast	Won	
Season 4	2024	23rd KBS Entertainment Awards	Best Entertainer Award	Moon Se-yoon	Won	

== Baeksang Arts Awards ==
Season	Year	Award	Category	Recipient	Result	Ref
Season 1	2008	44th Baeksang Arts Awards	Grand Prize – Television	Kang Ho-dong	Won	
Season 1	2008	44th Baeksang Arts Awards	Best Variety Performer – Male	Kang Ho-dong	Nominated	
Season 1	2011	47th Baeksang Arts Awards	Best Variety Performer – Male	Lee Soo-geun	Won	
Season 3	2017	53rd Baeksang Arts Awards	Best Variety Performer – Male	Kim Jong-min	Nominated	
Season 4	2020	56th Baeksang Arts Awards	Best Variety Performer – Male	Moon Se-yoon	Nominated	
Season 4	2021	57th Baeksang Arts Awards	Best Variety Performer – Male	Moon Se-yoon	Nominated	
Season 4	2022	58th Baeksang Arts Awards	Best Variety Performer – Male	Moon Se-yoon	Nominated	

== Others ==
Season	Year	Award	Category	Recipient	Result	Ref
Season 1	2008	Korea Entertainment Art Awards	Best Comedian	Lee Soo-geun	Won	
Season 1	2008	Korea Entertainment Art Awards	Best Program	2 Days & 1 Night Season 1	Won	
Season 1	2008	Korea Broadcasting Prizes	Best Entertainment TV Program	Happy Sunday	Won	
Season 1	2008	Korean PD Awards	Best Show Host	Kang Ho-dong	Won	
Season 1	2009	Korean PD Awards	Best Variety Show	2 Days & 1 Night Season 1	Won	
Season 1	2009	Korean Broadcasters' Awards	Best Produced Program	2 Days & 1 Night Season 1	Won	
Season 1	2011	Korea Broadcasting Prizes	Best Entertainment TV Program	2 Days & 1 Night Season 1	Won	
Season 3	2016	Korea Broadcasting Prizes	Best Variety Show	2 Days & 1 Night Season 3	Won	
Season 4	2021	Korea Broadcasting Prizes	Best TV Picture Award	2 Days & 1 Night Season 4	Won	
Season 4	2021	Korea Broadcasting Prizes	Entertainer Popularity Award	Kim Seon-ho	Won	
Season 4	2021	Brand Customer Loyalty Awards	Weekend Variety Show	2 Days & 1 Night Season 4	Won	
