= Jang Jin-young (singer) =

South Korean singer (born 1983)

- 장진영
- Born: Jang Jin-young; July 1, 1983 (age 43); Chuncheon, South Korea
- Occupations: Singer, vocal trainer
- Spouse: Kang Hae-in (m. 2017)
- Musical career
- Genres: K-pop
- Instrument: Vocals
- Years active: 2002–present
- Label: SM Entertainment

Korean name
- Hangul: 장진영
- RR: Jang Jinyeong
- MR: Chang Chinyŏng

Jang Jin-young (Korean: 장진영; born July 1, 1983) is a South Korean singer and the former lead singer of the boy group Black Beat. He is a vocal director for SM Entertainment and has trained artists such as BoA, Exo, Red Velvet and aespa. In 2013, he opened his own voice coaching company called A-Top Company and is currently the CEO.

== Career ==
Jang Jin-young made his debut as the lead singer of the boy group Black Beat which was formed by S.M. Entertainment in 2002. The five-member group released their first album Volume 1 – Black Beat #2002 but has been inactive since 2006. He also became a member of the duo 'by JINSUNG' before debuting in 2011 as a solo artist with the release of the single "시간이 흐른 뒤 (Another Time)" and mini album Vocalist.

In 2013, he founded his own voice coaching company called A-Top Company with fellow SM Entertainment vocal coach Kim Sung-pil and became the CEO. The company has since trained artists such as Exo, BTS, Red Velvet, NCT, aespa and Dean

He participated as a vocal trainer for S.M. Entertainment in the reality-survival show, K-pop Star and gained popularity in 2017 after appearing in the second season of Sister's Slam Dunk where he earned the nickname "지충쌤" or "Mr. Serious" for his training style. On June 23, he collaborated with The Barberettes for the song "Stranger's Love" which was released as part of the second season of SM Station, a special digital music project in which S.M. Entertainment releases a single every week. In July, he became a vocal trainer for the Mnet reality girl group survival show, Idol School along with S.E.S member Bada.

In 2023, he appeared as a vocal trainer in the MBC reality competition program Fantasy Boys.

== Personal life ==
In April 2017, Jang Jin-young announced his plans to marry his girlfriend of 10 years, actress Kang Hae-in (강해인), in October. They were wed on October 21 at a ceremony attended by the couple's family, friends and other S.M. Entertainment artists.

== Discography ==
=== Extended plays ===
| Title | Album details |
|---|---|
| Vocalist | Released: July 13, 2011; Formats: CD, Digital download |

=== Singles ===
| Year | Single |
|---|---|
| 2012 | "시간이 흐른 뒤 (Another Time)" |
| 2012 | "Vocalist" |
| 2017 | "Stranger's Love" (with The Barberettes) |

== Filmography ==
=== Television shows ===
| Year | Title | Network | Role |
|---|---|---|---|
| 2011–2012 | K-pop Star | SBS | Vocal trainer |
| 2017 | Unnie's Slam Dunk | KBS2 | Vocal trainer |
| 2017 | Idol School | Mnet | Vocal trainer |
| 2023 | Fantasy Boys | MBC | Vocal trainer |
