= Shut Up (Unnies song) =

Single by Unnies featuring You Hee-yeol
- Released: July 1, 2016
- Recorded: 2016
- Genre: K-pop
- Length: 3:11
- Label: KBS Media, LOEN
- Songwriters: Park Jin-young; Jessi
- Producer: Park Jin-young

"Shut Up" is a song by Unnies, a special girl group comprising the cast members from the South Korean reality show Sister's Slam Dunk. Written and produced by Park Jin-young, it was released by KBS Media and LOEN Entertainment on July 1, 2016. As of 2021, the track was not made available on streaming services.

== Background and release ==
Sister's Slam Dunk is a South Korean reality show starring Ra Mi-ran, Kim Sook, Hong Jin-kyung, Min Hyo-rin, Jessi and Tiffany that follows the cast's attempt at fulfilling their personal dreams. In order to accomplish Min Hyo-rin's dream of debuting as a member of a girl group, the cast formed a special girl group named Unnies and began working on a song produced by Park Jin-young. Hyo-rin had been a trainee at JYP Entertainment but was cut by the company, although she later debuted as a soloist and has released an album, it was a regret of hers that she had been unable to debut as a girl group member. Recording and choreography practice sessions for the song, later revealed to be titled "Shut Up", took place at JYP's headquarters and made up several episodes of the show.

"Shut Up" was released on July 1, 2016. Its music video, which features guest appearances by You Hee-yeol, Kim Joon-ho, Park Jin-young, Nine Muses member Gyeongree and Got7 member Jackson, was released on July 8. All profits from the single are reportedly donated towards helping people in need achieve their dreams.

== Promotion ==
Unnies made their debut performance with "Shut Up" on the KBS music television show Music Bank on July 1, 2016.

== Track listing ==
| No. | Title | Lyrics | Music | Length |
|---|---|---|---|---|
| 1. | "Shut Up" (featuring You Hee-yeol) | Park Jin-young; Jessi (rap) | Park Jin-young; Yoo Geon-hyung | 03:11 |

== Charts ==
"Shut Up" debuted at number 4 on the South Korean Gaon weekly digital chart.

| Chart (2016) | Peak position |
|---|---|
| South Korea (Gaon) | 3 |

Sales

| Chart | Sales |
|---|---|
| South Korean Download Chart | 724,088 |

== Release history ==
| Region | Date | Format | Label |
|---|---|---|---|
| South Korea | July 1, 2016 | Digital download | KBS Media, LOEN Entertainment |
