= The Ranksters =

South Korean television show

- Promotional poster
- Hangul: 뭐든지 프렌즈
- RR: Mwodeunji peurenjeu
- MR: Mwŏdŭnji p'ŭrenjŭ
- Genre: Variety
- Country of origin: South Korea
- Original language: Korean
- No. of seasons: 1
- No. of episodes: 8

Production
- Production location: South Korea
- Running time: 80 minutes

Original release
- Network: tvN
- Release: July 17 – September 4, 2019

The Ranksters (Korean: 뭐든지 프렌즈) was a South Korean variety show program on tvN. It was aired on tvN on Wednesdays at 23:00 (KST).

== Cast ==
=== Ranking Market Employees ===
- Boom
- Lee Si-won

=== Anything Friends ===
- Moon Se-yoon
- Hwang Je-sung
- Yang Se-hyung
- Park Na-rae
- Yang Se-chan
- Hong Yoon-hwa

== Synopsis ==
=== Episode 1-5 ===
This show features 2 segments, namely "No Matter What Ranking Mart" and "Taste Detective Friends". The cast will be split into pairs, while the guests will form their own pair.

In the first segment, "No Matter What Ranking Mart", the pairs compete to guess the results of real-life Korean surveys (similar to Family Feud). Each round has a different theme, and pairs take turns guessing the top 5 responses out of 30 items, such as "Top 5 items that you are reluctant to buy using your own money but other people are thankful for when gifted to them as presents from you". If a pair chooses an item that is not under the Top 5, they will have to pay for the item with their own credit cards. The pair that guesses the most top 5 items will have their spending deducted to zero. From episode 4, the pairs only have to answer the top 3 out of 20 items.

In the second segment, "Taste Detective Friends", participants moved to the Food Court. There was a food theme assigned for each episode. The game involved several versions of food, some of which were on the market, while the rest of the versions were made by the production team. The pairs had to play games to get to chosen first, as they each attempted to guess which were the real versions. If participants guessed correctly, they not have to pay for these food products using their own credit cards.

The money spent by the cast was used to purchase the items to be used for future episodes.

=== Episode 6-8 ===
New segments are introduced, in addition to the current segments shown in the first 5 episodes. The main objective for each episode is to pick each episode's Employee of the Week through competitions between the cast and 2 guests every week.

The games included:

- Guessing the titles of several songs that were played at the same time.
- Charades. In episode 6, the English words speed quiz was played with a foreigner. Each side had 100 seconds to explain as many words as they could to the foreigner in English.
- Guessing the correct song and its singer based on its music video, which would play a different song.
- A slightly modified version of "Taste Detective Friends". During each round, 4 types of food were shown, and each team had to choose only 1 type of food they think is actually sold.

== Episodes ==
- Pair A consists of Park Na-rae and Yang Se-chan
- Pair B consists of Hwang Je-sung and Yang Se-hyung
- Pair C consists of Moon Se-yoon and Hong Yoon-hwa
- Guests will form Pair D

Ep.	Broadcast Date	Guest(s)	No Matter What Ranking Mart			Taste Detective Friends			Final spending
Ep.	Broadcast Date	Guest(s)	Theme	Top Items	Spending	Theme	Food Items (Note: Food that is actually being sold)	Correct Guessers	Final spending
1	July 17, 2019	—N/a	Top 5 items that you will be reluctant to buy using your own money but other people are thankful for when gifted to them as presents from you	1. High quality tumbler 2. Mini air purifier 3. Flowers; 4. Beer foam maker 5. Mini flower pot	Pair A: ₩588,430; Pair B: ₩216,790; Pair C: ₩0 (Note: Originally spent ₩110,500 but won the segment)	Jjajangmyeon	1. Chilli galbi jjajangmyeon 2. Cotton candy jaengban-jjajangmyeon 3. King octopus jaengban-jjajangmyeon	Yang Se-chan; Yang Se-hyung; Hong Yoon-hwa	Pair A: ₩614,830; Pair B: ₩224,790; Pair C: ₩10,500
2	July 24, 2019	Solbi; Solbin (Laboum)	Top 5 hot Hallyu items based on an overseas shopping portal	1. Seaweed; 2. Snail cream 3. Italy towel 4. Konjac sponge 5. Insect screen repair tape	Pair A: ₩0 (Note: Originally spent ₩39,914 but won the segment); Pair B: ₩190,473; Pair C: ₩237,026; Pair D: ₩228,410	Cold food	1. Hanwoo naeng-gomtang 2. Chicken ice cream burger	Yang Se-chan; Park Na-rae	Pair A: ₩0; Pair B: ₩190,473; Pair C: ₩237,026; Pair D: ₩278,910 (Note: Solbin's card was selected to pay for every other food that is not sold)
3	July 31, 2019	Kim Ji-min; Joo Woo-jae	Top 5 presents with most sense for newlywed homes according to the 30s and 40s	1. Air fryer 2. Mood lamp 3. LED wall clock 4. One shot drinking set 5. Mini beam projector	Pair A: ₩0 (Note: Originally spent ₩189,000 but won the segment); Pair B: ₩260,350; Pair C: ₩88,600; Pair D: ₩389,000	Doenjang	1. Siraegi doenjang pasta 2. Doenjang fried chicken	Park Na-rae; Hong Yoon-hwa	Pair A: ₩0; Pair B: ₩260,350; Pair C: ₩140,100 (Note: Moon Se-yoon's card was selected to pay for every other food that is not sold); Pair D: ₩389,000

- Pair A consists of Park Na-rae and Yang Se-chan
- Pair B consists of Moon Se-yoon and Yang Se-hyung
- Pair C consists of Hong Yoon-hwa and Hwang Je-sung
- Guests will form Pair D

Ep.	Broadcast Date	Guest(s)	No Matter What Ranking Mart			Taste Detective Friends			Final spending
Ep.	Broadcast Date	Guest(s)	Theme	Top Items	Spending	Theme	Food Items (Note: Food that is actually being sold)	Correct Guessers	Final spending
4	August 7, 2019	Jang Sung-kyu; Jimin (AOA)	Top 3 hot items for the summer with 2000% in rise of sales based on an e-commerce website from June 1 to July 15, 2019	1. TBA; 2. TBA; 3. TBA	—N/a	Fried chicken & burger	1. Vegetable tongdak 2. Tongyeong oyster burger set 3. Yukhoe burger set	Yang Se-hyung; Park Na-rae; Jang Sung-kyu	Pair A: TBA; Pair B: TBA; Pair C: TBA; Pair D: TBA
5	August 14, 2019	Heo Jung-min; Jang Do-yeon	Top 3 South Korea summer attractions	1. Yeouido Hangang Park, Seoul; 2. Majang Lake Suspension Bridge, Paju; 3. Eurwangni Beach, Incheon	Pair A: ₩119,900; Pair B: ₩0 (Note: Won the segment); Pair C: ₩30,500; Pair D: ₩119,000	Jjamppong	1. Cheese jjamppong 2. Basil jjamppong 3. Peanut jjamppong	Hong Yoon-hwa; Jang Do-yeon; Yang Se-chan	Pair A: ₩ Pair B: ₩ Pair C: ₩ Pair D: ₩

- Pair A consists of Park Na-rae and Yang Se-chan
- Pair B consists of Hwang Je-sung and Yang Se-hyung
- Pair C consists of Moon Se-yoon and Hong Yoon-hwa
- Guests will form Pair D

Ep.	Broadcast Date	Guest(s)	Taste Detective Friends		Employee of the Week
Ep.	Broadcast Date	Guest(s)	Food Items	Correct Guessers	Employee of the Week
6	August 21, 2019	Koyote (Kim Jong-min, Shin Ji), Terris Brown	1. Raw octopus oil squid ink pasta 2. Dakbal pizza	Pair A Pair C	Yang Se-chan
7	August 28, 2019	Yoo Se-yoon, Lee Sang-joon	1. Raw mango jokbal 2. Sky blue carbonara	Pair D Pair D	Yoo Se-yoon
8	September 4, 2019	—N/a	TBA	TBA	TBA

== Ratings ==
- Ratings listed below are the individual corner ratings of The Ranksters. (Note: Individual corner ratings do not include commercial time, which regular ratings include.)
- In the ratings below, the highest rating for the show will be in red and the lowest rating for the show will be in blue each year.

=== 2019 ===
Ep. #	Original Airdate	AGB Nielsen Ratings Nationwide
1	July 17	1.128%
2	July 24	1.011%
3	July 31	0.939%
4	August 7	0.698%
5	August 14	0.725%
6	August 21	0.853%
7	August 28	0.7%
8	September 4	0.614%
