= Sister's Slam Dunk =

2016–2017 South Korean reality show

- Season 1
- Also known as: Unnie's Slam Dunk
- Hangul: 언니들의 슬램덩크
- RR: Eonnideurui seullaemdeongkeu
- MR: Ŏnnidŭrŭi sŭllaemdŏngk'ŭ
- Genre: Reality show
- Starring: Season 1: Ra Mi-ran; Kim Sook; Hong Jin-kyung; Min Hyo-rin; Jessi; Tiffany Season 2: Kim Sook; Hong Jin-kyung; Kang Ye-won; Han Chae-young; Hong Jin-young; Minzy; Jeon Somi
- Country of origin: South Korea
- Original language: Korean
- No. of seasons: 2
- No. of episodes: 49

Production
- Producers: Park In-seok; Hwang Min-kyu; Park Seon-hye; Chae Seung-woo
- Production location: Seoul
- Running time: 140 minutes

Original release
- Network: KBS 2TV
- Release: April 8, 2016 – May 26, 2017

Sister's Slam Dunk (Korean: 언니들의 슬램덩크; RR: Eonnideurui seullaemdeongkeu) is a South Korean reality show that aired every Friday on KBS 2TV from April 8 to December 2, 2016. The show's first season featured an all-female cast consisting of Ra Mi-ran, Kim Sook, Hong Jin-kyung, Min Hyo-rin, Jessi and Tiffany, and followed their attempts at fulfilling each cast member's dream using a budget of ₩2,196,000 or approximately $2,000.

The cast members formed a special girl group named "Unnies" (언니쓰; eonnisseu) and released a Park Jin-young-produced single titled "Shut Up", featuring You Hee-yeol, in July 2016.

Season 2 of the program focused primarily on the girl group project, which was Min Hyo-rin's dream in season 1. The show followed seven members, Kang Ye-won, Han Chae-young, Hong Jin-young, Minzy and Jeon Somi, with Kim Sook and Hong Jin-kyung returning, as they formed the second generation of "Unnies", produced by Kim Hyeong-seok (Park Jin-young's mentor). The fulfillment of each member's personal dreams have become the side projects of the program. The fan club name for the group remains as "Dongsaengs" (i.e. younger siblings) and their official greeting, as suggested by Heo Kyung-hwan, is "Shoot! Shoot! Shoot!, Hello! We are Unnies!", with an emphasis on the basketball shooting motion while saying "Shoot". Their official fandom object is a denim-colored balloon.

== Content ==
Sister's Slam Dunk follows the "Real Variety Show" format where the content is mostly unscripted. Additionally, there are no signature segments within the show, as it focuses on completing a single major objective over the course of several episodes. In resemblance to a reality show and a documentary show, each episode also documented their activities together and the relationship between the members. In season 1, the overarching theme of the show was the fulfillment of each member's dreams. Every episode focused on accomplishing several tasks that would lead to the fulfillment of those dreams. The members' dreams are, in chronological order:

1. Kim Sook – Obtaining a bus driver's license. Episodes for this dream revolves around the members, especially Kim Sook and Jessi, practicing the way to drive a bus with the final task to participate in a qualification exam to obtain the license.
2. Min Hyo-rin – Debuting in a girl group. Episodes for this dream revolves around the members practicing singing and dancing techniques to debut as idol singers. The members created a girl group, called "Unnies", and a song was produced for the members by Park Jin-young of JYP Entertainment with the final task to perform at the KBS Music Bank.
3. Jessi – Completing three missions from the past, present, and future from Jessi's father. Episodes for this dream revolves around the members accommodating to the requests of Jessi's parents with the final task to create a fake wedding for Jessi.
4. Hong Jin-kyung – Producing a Hong Jinkyung Show. Episodes for this dream revolves around the members filming the short film Was Will with the final task to submit the short film to a film festival.
5. Ra Mi-ran – Building/remodeling a house, having a photoshoot, camping, and producing a Christmas carol. Episodes for this dream revolves around the members planning and working to build a restaurant after finding an abandoned building. Additionally, similar to Min Hyo-rin's dream, the members practice their singing techniques in preparation for the carol recording.

In season 2, the format remains as "Real Variety Show" without a scripted segment and follows the members' activities across a certain period of time. However, the theme of the show focused on the continuation of the girl group project, "Unnies". The content for each episode chronicles the members' progress towards releasing songs and training for their stage performance. Similar to season 1, each episode documented their activities for a couple of days and their bonding as group members.

== Cast ==
=== Season 1 ===
- Ra Mi-ran, actress born 1975
- Kim Sook, comedian born 1975
- Hong Jin-kyung, model and host born 1977
- Min Hyo-rin, actress born 1986
- Jessi, singer born 1988
- Tiffany, singer born 1989 (withdrew in August 2016 due to controversy)

=== Season 2 ===
- Kim Sook, comedian born 1975
- Hong Jin-kyung, model and host born 1977
- Kang Ye-won, actress born 1980
- Han Chae-young, actress born 1980
- Hong Jin-young, singer born 1985
- Minzy, singer born 1994
- Jeon So-mi, singer born 2001

== Episodes ==
Year	Episodes	Originally aired	
Year	Episodes	First aired	Last aired
2016	33	April 8, 2016	December 2, 2016
2017	16	February 10, 2017	May 26, 2017

=== Season 1 ===
2016

#	Episodes	Air Date	Synopsis	Guest/Notes
1	1	April 8, 2016	The cast members are introduced through an interview with 3 "variety show masters" (cast members of 1 Night 2 Days), and meet each other for the first time. Kim Sook is chosen as the first dreamer, and her dream is to be a tour bus driver. The members divide into two teams: one to get the license (Kim Sook, Jessi, Tiffany), and the other to find a driving mentor (Ra Mi-ran, Hong Jin-kyung, Min Hyo-rin).	Kim Jong-min, Cha Tae-hyun, Defconn
2	2	April 15, 2016	Both teams proceed with their assigned task, and Jo Se-ho comes to inform them about road safety.	Jo Se-ho, Park Bo-gum
3	3	April 22, 2016	The members go on an outing as proposed by Kim Sook, and chooses the second dreamer. During the trip, the members are fulfilling their wishes as well as the rule. Min Hyo-rin is the first to get her wish, which is to do a makeover for the older members. Kim Sook gets her wish to eat alone, and Tiffany gets her wish to visit an amusement park.	
4	4	April 29, 2016	The members arrive at their rest place and spends the night playing games getting to know each other. The following morning, Jessi gets her wish to try bungee jumping.	
5	5	May 6, 2016	Min Hyo-rin is chosen as the second dreamer. Her dream is to debut as a girl group member (having been once a trainee) and they get help from Park Jin-young (JYP) as the producer (coincidentally JYP Entertainment was where Hyo-rin trained to be a singer before becoming an actress).	Park Jin-young
6	6	May 13, 2016	The members visit Music Bank and watch a pre-recording of Twice's "Cheer Up". Afterwards, they spent some time with the members as they learn more about being an idol. They also hear the pre-produced version of their debut song, "Shut Up". They also visit I.O.I during their debut stage practices and have talks regarding debuting as girl group from different agencies.	Park Jin-young, Twice, I.O.I
7	7	May 20, 2016	Kim Sook & Jessi are taking the exams for the bus driver's license, while the members also work on the second dream and their girl group name.	Taeyeon, Park Jin-young
8	8	May 27, 2016	Park Jin-young teaches the girls the choreography for their debut song. They also get their personality checked through a MBTI test and celebrate Tiffany's solo debut (I Just Wanna Dance) at Music Bank.	Park Jin-young, Block B, Yesung, Park Sang-hee (psychoanalyst)
9	9	June 3, 2016	With Tiffany missing through a concert schedule with Girls' Generation, the rest of the members work on their singing and choreography. Ra Mi-ran and Kim Sook consult with Jo Kwon and Ye-eun, Min Hyo-rin and Hong Jin-kyung consult with Kim Tae-woo and Jessi works on the rap part.	Park Jin-young, Jo Kwon, Ye-eun, Kim Tae-woo
10	10	June 10, 2016	The first recordings for the song, and more work on the choreography. The members also decide on the costumes and makeup style.	Park Jin-young, Jung Bo-yoon (stylist)
11	11	June 17, 2016	The recordings continue for the chorus and rap part, but Hong Jin-kyung still struggles with her part making her stay at the studio longer while the other members perfect the choreography. After the recording, Min Hyo-rin invites the members to her house.	Park Jin-young, Park Kyung-hwa (art psychoanalyst)
12	12	June 24, 2016	As their debut date is getting near, the members work harder on the choreography. Later Bada and Shoo of S.E.S. visit them to give tips on debuting as girl group. Footage of the 52nd Paeksang Arts Awards is then shown, where both Kim Sook (Best Variety Performer – Female) & Ra Mi-ran (Best Supporting Actress) receive an award. The members then hold a congratulatory celebration at Park Jin-young's bar at one of his performance nights, where they discuss the song and the upcoming music video filming, which Park Jin-young suggests his bar as one of the sets.	Park Jin-young, S.E.S. (Bada, Shoo), Shin Dong-yeop, Kim Hyeong-seok
13	13	July 1, 2016	The members continue to polish their choreography with their backup dancers, while also finalizing their outfit concepts. A preview snippet of the final version of the members' song is played by Park Jin-young, before practice resumes. The filming of the music video then commences at a club, with guests, Kim Jun-ho as Min Hyo-rin's boyfriend and You Hee-yeol as Hyo-rin's previous boyfriend.	Park Jin-young, Jung Bo-yoon (stylist), You Hee-yeol, Kim Jun-ho "Shut Up" is digitally released on this date at midnight.
14	14	July 8, 2016	The music video filming continues at Park Jin-young's bar with several cameo appearances from the members' friends. After their shooting is completed, Kim Sook, Hong Jin-kyung, & Min Hyo-rin then successfully convinces Music Bank PD to include their song in the nearest date.	Park Jin-young, You Hee-yeol, Kim Jun-ho, Kyungri, Nam Chang-hee, Kim In-seok, Sleepy, Park Hwi-soon, Jackson Wang, Won Seung-yeon (Music Bank's main PD) "Shut Up"'s official MV is first shown at the end of the episode.
15	15	July 15, 2016	With only 7 days until debut, the members go on a trip to relax and open up to each other, but they end up still practicing for their upcoming debut. Later on, "Shut Up" is finally released, along with the teaser for their MV, and the song manages to rank #1 after 4 hours. The members then proceed towards Music Bank for their long-awaited debut.	Park Jin-young
16	16	July 22, 2016	The Unnies finally debut live at Music Bank (while still maintaining their #1 rank at online music charts). The second dream comes to an end and the members present a gift to Park Jin-young as they bid farewell.	Park Jin-young's last recurring appearance Park Jin-young, Gugudan, Tae Jin-ah, Taeyeon, U-KISS, Hosts of Music Bank (Kang Min-hyuk, Solbin), KBS 6 NEWS TIME crew
17	17	July 29, 2016	Jessi is chosen as the third dreamer, choosing to learn boxing. But after starting this dream, she discovers that the other members' prepared a surprise with the crew: her real dream is to spend time with her parents who live abroad, and complete three tasks chosen by her father.	Lee Kye-in
18	18	August 5, 2016	The three tasks from Jessi's father are revealed: one related to the past by playing basketball together; one to the present, seeing Jessi perform; and one to the future, organize a pretend wedding.	
19	19	August 26, 2016	The members fulfill the two first tasks, and start to organize the pretend wedding.	Oppas: Nam Chang-hee, Kim In-seok, Sleepy, Park Hwi-soon, Song Yeong-gil, Kim Dong-jun
20	20	September 2, 2016	Jessi's pretend wedding is a success. The fourth dreamer is chosen as Hong Jin-kyung, whose dream is to host her own television show.	Ha Jung-woo (via phone); Oppas: Nam Chang-hee, Kim In-seok, Sleepy, Park Hwi-soon, Song Yeong-gil, Kim Dong-jun; Kim Tae-ho (via phone), Ryu Ho-jin, Song Eun-i (via phone), Jang Jin
21	21	September 9, 2016	The members then tell Jang Jin of Hong Jin-kyung's idea for her dream of a Hong Jingyeong Show. The members start brainstorming to find ideas for the show with each member asking for advice from several people. The members then present their ideas to Jang Jin, with the director deciding Jin-kyung's idea of environmental awareness in regards to health & well-being as the best theme for the show. The members then meet up with "Speech Dart" professor Kim Hyun-ah (who guested in MBC's My Little Television) to help them in their speech as TV presenters for Hong Jin-kyung's dream. The PD then announces that the volleyball player and Olympic competitor Kim Yeon-koung would be a special guest and a "dreamer" for several episodes.	Tiffany's last appearance as a cast member Jang Jin, Yoo Byung-jae, Park Hwi-soon, Kim Hyun-ah (Sungkyunkwan University professor), Kim Yeon-koung
22	22	September 16, 2016	The members meet up with athlete Kim Yeon-koung, who stated her dream to be a rapper. Due to only having a week to prepare, they will be aided by "teachers", which is revealed to be Lee Sang-min (former member of Roo'ra) & rapper DinDin. The members then head out to eat at the restaurant when they began the girl group project and surprise Kim Yeon-koung with the presence of her fellow 2016 Olympic volleyball teammates. The members then try to fulfill her special dream of being a rapper.	Lee Sang-min, DinDin, Kim Yeon-koung; Volleyball players: Hwang Youn-joo, Yang Hyo-jin, Kim Su-ji
23	23	September 23, 2016	The members meet up with Dynamic Duo and start practicing (under 10 hours) for their stage performance: a modified version of one of their well-known tracks, "Friday Night" at a well-known club at midnight.	Kim Yeon-koung's last recurring appearance Kim Yeon-koung, Dynamic Duo
24	24	September 30, 2016	Jang Jin then decides on the format of Hong Jingyeong Show: a movie with a fake documentary format, which he plans to enter in a film festival. The members do camera-recording trials with Jang Jin and are tasked with finding material for the show. The members then find out where their recycled trash goes to, and do a debate on protecting the environment.	Jang Jin; Debate panel: Park Jin-hee, Kim Jong-min, Kim Jun-hyun, Sam Okyere, Tyler Rasch, Song Eun-i, Kim Ji-min, Zhang Yu'an
25	25	October 7, 2016	The members measure the fine dust level within their surroundings while doing their own efforts in protecting the environment, from recycling to DIY eco-friendly products. The members then meet with former politician-turned-writer Rhyu Si-min in regards with Hong Jin-kyung's ideas. Jang Jin and the members then start shooting Hong Jingyeong Show's first scenes inside Seoul City Hall, with Jessi as the holder of the boom microphone. Jang Jin then informs the members that he plans to include their work in the 14th Asiana International Short Film Festival (AISFF), where they have to convince the film festival chairman Ahn Sung-ki.	Jo Yoon-hee, Cha In-pyo, Lee Hwi-jae, Rhyu Si-min, Jang Jin, Lee Han-wi
26	26	October 14, 2016	As the last dreamer, Ra Mi-ran then reveals that she plans to completely use what is left of their planned money, while she relates her life story at her old house. The members then meet up with AISFF chairman Ahn Sung-ki to convince him to include Hong Jingyeong Show in the film festival, while continuing to work on the movie's next scenes.	Jang Jin, Ahn Sung-ki, Kim Min-kyo
27	27	October 21, 2016	Ra Mi-ran's 1st dream is revealed, which is to build a house. They go to a vacant building to begin the process of building a restaurant in goodwill, with Ra Mi-ran's idea being chosen. Because of the rainy weather, they can't shoot scenes for the movie, rescheduling it instead for next week instead. Jessi and Kim Sook then receive their roles and lines for the movie, as they eat out with Jang Jin. The following week they go to work on the movie's car scene with Min Hyo-rin. After debating ideas, the cast then goes to Music Bank in search of someone young who can act. They finally settle on Music Bank host Kang Min-hyuk, and go to the MC's waiting room to ask him to act for them.	Jang Jin, Kang Min-hyuk, BTS
28	28	October 28, 2016	Hong Jin-kyung, Min Hyo-rin, and Jang Jin are filming their "fake" documentary while the other cast members paint the interior of the restaurant. In consideration, Hyo-rin then invites actor Kwak Si-yang with whom she worked in Persevere, Goo Hae Ra, to help the remaining members. The final design and floor plan of the restaurant is completed and split into sections for further development, with the members then bargaining and listing quotations on the necessary materials on a budget of ₩3,500,000 ($3,500). On another day, Jessi's films her part in one of the sets from Mi-ran's currently-airing drama The Gentlemen of Wolgyesu Tailor Shop while Kim Sook's double-role as a doctor and a dengue patient and Hong Jin-kyung boat scene is also filmed.	Jang Jin, Kwak Si-yang
29	29	November 4, 2016	Jessi, Ra Mi-ran, and Kim Sook go to make a table, which Kim Sook shows off her wood-working skills. Hong Seok-cheon comes to help with the restaurant set up. Later, the cast throw a Halloween party with Hong Jin-kyung and Jessi dressed up as cats, Min Hyo-rin as Harley Quinn, Sook as No-Face, and Ra Mi-ran as Marge Simpson. They spend the night near Gangnam station, talking to fans and doing silly antics.	Hong Seok-cheon, Jo Chung-hyeon, Hosts of infogram 2TV Real Live (Lee Seul-gi, Do Kyung-wan)
30	30	November 11, 2016	By the day of the film festival filming has been completed, and the members preview their "fake" documentary Was Will (originally Korean: 내일도 미래람면; RR: naeildo miraerammyeon, translated If Tomorrow is the Future). The cast then has a congratulatory dinner, and present a gift to Jang Jin as they bid their farewells to him.	Jang Jin's last recurring appearance Jang Jin, Kim Won-hae, Kim Seul-gi, Bae Sung-il, Kim Jung-min, Jo Chung-hyeon
31	31	November 18, 2016	The members continue with Ra Mi-ran's next dream, who has another dream of going caroling. Sung Si-kyung comes to help with the dream, and the cast goes to their restaurant to add the finishing touches with Lee Soo-geun assisting. They buy a kimchi refrigerator as a gift, and then later hold a love-counseling lesson with college students. Various students come to get help and are later set up with blind dates.	Sung Si-kyung, Lee Soo-geun
32	32	November 25, 2016	Another dream of Ra Mi-ran is revealed to be camping, and Mi-ran comes prepared with all the needed supplies. Once the cast reaches their destination they set up, prepare food, and play a version of "Never Have I Ever" with many personal questions. As the restaurant is officially opened, the cast members get to taste the food and hold the 3:3 blind date which includes Jessi's stylist. The blind date is a success, and Ra Mi-ran's dream restaurant is opened for the public.	
33	33	December 2, 2016	In the final episode, the members meet up again with Sung Si-kyung to go over their three holiday songs. They record the song the following week, to be revealed in the last part of the episode. Ra Mi-ran's dream draws to an end with a photoshoot of the cast members by rapper Bbaek Ga. The photoshoot concludes with the members saying their final words to the viewers, and one last cheer by the cast. At the end of the episode, the carol album is revealed, alongside photos from each dream in season 1 of Sister's Slam Dunk.	Sung Si-kyung, Bbaek Ga

=== Season 2 ===
2017

#	Episodes	Air Date	Synopsis	Guest/Notes
34	1	February 10, 2017	The cast members are introduced through a meeting with music producer, Kim Hyeong-seok, who will be the producer for their girl group project. Each member was individually interviewed by him where they revealed their ambition and reason for participating in the program. They also bring items and songs that represent them as part of their introduction to the other members.	I.O.I, Matthew Douma (Somi's father), Jeon Sun-hee (Somi's mother), Evelyn Douma (Somi's sister), Kim Hyeong-seok, Jang Jin-young (vocal coach), Han Won-jong (vocal director), Kim Hwa-young (choreographer), Kim Kyu-sang (visual performance director), Ahn Hyuk-mo (acting coach), Kolleen Park (musical director)
35	2	February 17, 2017	The cast members begin their evaluations in singing and dancing, as they start living as trainees.	Kim Hyeong-seok, Jang Jin-young (vocal coach), Han Won-jong (vocal director), Kim Hwa-young (choreographer), Kim Kyu-sang (visual performance director), Ahn Hyuk-mo (acting coach), Kolleen Park (musical director), Rain (via phone)
36	3	February 24, 2017	The cast members spend their first night together before resuming their training when they also decide to make Minzy as the leader of their group. Kim Hyeong-seok, Kim Hwa-young and Kim Kyu-sang assess their improvement in dancing from their performance of Sunmi's "Full Moon" for Somi and Minzy while the others perform Sistar19's "Ma Boy".	Heo Kyung-hwan, Kim Hyeong-seok, Kim Hwa-young (choreographer), Kim Kyu-sang (visual performance director), Jun Hyo-seong (Secret), Bora (Sistar), Han Chae-ah, Park Si-yeon, Kim Sung-eun
37	4	March 3, 2017	The members take a MBTI personality test which Kim Sook and Hong Jin-kyung took when they did the girl group project in season 1. Subsequently, they get a chance to listen to their new song, which was composed by Kim Hyeong-seokand written by lyricist Kim Eana, and vote which version of the song they would use. The members then meet Heo Kyung-hwan, Leeteuk and Red Velvet where they receive advice about idol's activities, such as deciding on Unnies' official greeting.	Park Sang-hee (psychoanalyst), Matthew Douma (Somi's father), Jeon Sun-hee (Somi's mother), Evelyn Douma (Somi's sister), Lee Yeon-bok (chef), Kim Hyeong-seok, Kim Eana (lyricist), Heo Kyung-hwan, Leeteuk (Super Junior), Red Velvet (except Joy), Lee Sang-yoon (via phone)
38	5	March 10, 2017	Kang Ye-won goes to an otolaryngologist to be diagnosed on her vocal folds' condition. Later on, they begin the vocal practice for their new song with vocal coach Jang Jin-young. Afterwards, the members have a birthday party for Somi and Kang Ye-won at the latter's house.	Lee Soo-young (Otolaryngologist), Jang Jin-young (vocal coach)
39	6	March 17, 2017	The members visit Music Bank to support Hong Jin-young. The PD then suddenly reveals that the song, which was shown to them, will not be used and two new songs are introduced, instead.	Twice, Taeyeon, Kim Hyeong-seok, Kim Eana (lyricist), Jang Jin-young (vocal coach), Han Won-jong (vocal director), Kim Hwa-young (choreographer), Kim Kyu-sang (visual performance director)
40	7	March 24, 2017	The members begin learning the vocal and dance routine for their first song, "Right?".	Jang Jin-young (vocal coach), Kim Hyeong-seok, Kim Hwa-young (choreographer), Kim Kyu-sang (visual performance director), Han Won-jong (vocal director)
41	8	March 31, 2017	The members are assessed and assigned to individual parts for their first song, "Right?". In addition, a few weeks before, the members went to the premiere of Kang Ye-won's film. Later on, the members present their concept ideas for their stage performance at the costume meeting.	Kim Hyeong-seok, Jang Jin-young (vocal coach), Han Won-jong (vocal director), Kisum, Uhm Jung-hwa, Park So-hyun, Choi Hee-sun (stylist), Kim Hwa-young (choreographer), Kim Kyu-sang (visual performance director)
42	9	April 7, 2017	The members have dinner after a busy day, then return to their dormitory to train. After seeing the full choreography of their first song and learning several basic skills, the members visit Immortal Songs: Singing the Legend. Later on, they are assessed on their basic rap skills and perform lyrics they are asked to write.	Kim Hwa-young (choreographer), Kim Kyu-sang (visual performance director), Hosts of Hello Counselor (Lee Young-ja, Cultwo), Hosts of Immortal Songs: Singing the Legend (Moon Hee-joon, Hwang Chi-yeul, Jung Jae-hyung), Kim Hyeong-seok, Killagramz (rap coach)
43	10	April 14, 2017	The members begin recording their first song, "Right?". While one of them is recording, the other members learn the song's choreography, which has been updated according to their vocal parts. Their performance of "Pick Me" and "Shut Up" during their visit to Immortal Songs: Singing the Legend is also shown.	Han Won-jong (vocal director), Kim Hyeong-seok, Jang Jin-young (vocal coach), Kim Hwa-young (choreographer), Kim Kyu-sang (visual performance director), Hosts of Immortal Songs: Singing the Legend (Moon Hee-joon, Hwang Chi-yeul, Jung Jae-hyung)
44	11	April 21, 2017	The members are being evaluated on their choreography progress before tuning it according to their vocal parts. The stylist, Choi Hee-sun, visits the show and reveal prototype version of their stage attire. Afterward, they begin the second recording session for "Right?", when it is decided that Kim Sook and Kang Ye-won are switching their vocal parts.	Kim Kyu-sang (visual performance director), Kim Hwa-young (choreographer), Kim Hyeong-seok, Choi Hee-sun (stylist), Jang Jin-young (vocal coach), Han Won-jong (vocal director)
45	12	April 28, 2017	Han Chae-young and Hong Jin-young are chosen to represent the members in KBS 1 vs. 100 in an attempt to raise funds for "Right?" music video. They also resume training for the full choreography for "Right?". The members' visit to 1 vs. 100 and their effort in the program is also shown. Later on, the assessment for the rapping part begins as the members showcase their skills. In the end, Hong Jin-young is chosen to perform the rapping part for "Right?".	Kim Hwa-young (choreographer), Seo Jin-ho (actress), Kim Hyeong-seok, Kim Kyu-sang (visual performance director), Jang Jin-young (vocal coach), Jo Chung-hyun (Host of 1 vs. 100), Defconn, Jessi
46	13	May 5, 2017	The members go for a 1 night 2 days trip to Busan. Hong Jin-young completes the recording of her rapping part for "Right?" and the members also finish the final recording session.	Kim Hyeong-seok, Han Won-jong (vocal director)
47	14	May 12, 2017	The members film the entire music video for "Right?"	Eunbin (CLC), Kim Sae-ron, Jeong Han-sol (CF director), Kim Hwa-young (choreographer), Kim Kyu-sang (visual performance director), Matthew Douma (Somi's father), Jeon Sun-hee (Somi's mother), Evelyn Douma (Somi's sister), Ahn Hyuk-mo (acting coach), Jang Jin-young (vocal coach), Kim Hyeong-seok, Han Won-jong (vocal director) "Right?" and "LaLaLa Song" were digitally released on this date at 12PM KST. "Right?"'s official MV is first shown at the end of the episode.
48	15	May 19, 2017	The members visit Music Bank for their debut. Additionally, they also interact with their fans, the Dongsaengs, and find their songs have reached the top of all daily music charts. Afterwards, each member receives a video message from their closest friends.	Kim Hwa-young (choreographer), Kim Kyu-sang (visual performance director), Kim Young-chul, Jang Jin-young (vocal coach), Hosts of Music Bank (Lee Seo-won, Solbin), Han Won-jong (vocal director), Ra Mi-ran, Cha Tae-hyun, Choi Yoo-jung, Kim Do-yeon, Min Hyo-rin
49	16	May 26, 2017	The members fulfill their promise for reaching the top of all daily music charts. Afterwards, they visit Konkuk University to participate in various events, which include their last performance.	IZ, Akdong Musician (Lee Chan-hyuk, Lee Su-hyun), Kim Hyeong-seok, MFBTY (Tiger JK, Yoon Mi-rae, Bizzy), Jung Sung-hwa, Kim Kyu-sang (visual performance director), Han Won-jong (vocal director), Jang Jin-young (vocal coach), Kim Hwa-young (choreographer)

== Ratings ==
In the table below, the blue number represents the lowest ratings and the red number represents the highest ratings.

=== Season 1 ===
2016

Episode #	Broadcast Date	Average national audience share (AGB Nielsen)
1	April 8, 2016	5.2%
2	April 15, 2016	4.9%
3	April 22, 2016	5.0%
4	April 29, 2016	3.2%
5	May 6, 2016	4.8%
6	May 13, 2016	4.5%
7	May 20, 2016	5.3%
8	May 27, 2016	6.4%
9	June 3, 2016	5.5%
10	June 10, 2016	7.5%
11	June 17, 2016	6.9%
12	June 24, 2016	7.0%
13	July 1, 2016	7.6%
14	July 8, 2016	7.5%
15	July 15, 2016	6.6%
16	July 22, 2016	7.8%
17	July 29, 2016	5.5%
18	August 5, 2016	5.1%
19	August 26, 2016	4.6%
20	September 2, 2016	3.8%
21	September 9, 2016	3.2%
22	September 16, 2016	4.8%
23	September 23, 2016	2.4%
24	September 30, 2016	2.6%
25	October 7, 2016	2.4%
26	October 14, 2016	3.2%
27	October 21, 2016	2.9%
28	October 28, 2016	2.6%
29	November 4, 2016	3.1%
30	November 11, 2016	2.6%
31	November 18, 2016	2.5%
32	November 25, 2016	2.7%
33	December 2, 2016	3.3%

=== Season 2 ===
2017

Episode #	Broadcast Date	Average national audience share (AGB Nielsen)
1	February 10, 2017	5.4%
2	February 17, 2017	3.8%
3	February 24, 2017	3.2%
4	March 3, 2017	3.2%
5	March 10, 2017	5.6%
6	March 17, 2017	3.2%
7	March 24, 2017	3.1%
8	March 31, 2017	3.6%
9	April 7, 2017	3.0%
10	April 14, 2017	3.9%
11	April 21, 2017	4.5%
12	April 28, 2017	3.8%
13	May 5, 2017	3.8%
14	May 12, 2017	5.1%
15	May 19, 2017	4.9%
16	May 26, 2017	4.8%

== Discography ==
Title	Album details	Peak chart positions		Sales	Album
Title	Album details	KOR	US World	Sales	Album
Season 1
"Shut Up" (featuring Yoo Hee-yeol)	Released: July 1, 2016; Label: KBS Media; Format: Digital download	3	—	KOR: 724,088+	Non-album single
Season 2
"Right?" (맞지?)	Released: May 12, 2017; Label: KBS Media; Format: Digital download	2	10	KOR: 953,036+	Non-album single
"Lalala Song" (랄랄라 송)	Released: May 12, 2017; Label: KBS Media; Format: Digital download	48	22	KOR: 96,638+	Non-album single
"—" denotes releases that did not chart or were not released in that region.

== Videography ==
=== Music videos ===
Year	Title	Director(s)	Length	Ref.
2016	"Shut up"	Park In Suk	3:58	Sister's Slam Dunk Season 1 episode 13
2017	"Right?" (맞지?)	Jeong Han Sol	4:41	Sister's Slam Dunk Season 2 episode 14

== Controversy ==
On August 14, 2016, (the day before Korean Liberation Day), Tiffany posted photos on Instagram and, a day later, onto Snapchat that included the current Japanese flag and the Rising Sun design which was part of a Snapchat geo-filter respectively while performing in Tokyo as a part of SM Town Live World Tour V. Although she had taken down her Snapchat post within minutes after posting, she faced substantial criticism, and she deleted the Instagram images soon after as well. The program received an outpouring of complaints demanding for the show to remove Tiffany. On August 18, 2016, the program announced that after discussing the situation with S.M. Entertainment, the decision to withdraw was reached. The official statement reads: "As a result of the discussion, we have the final decision for Tiffany to leave the show, in consideration of what we agree to be the effect that the controversy had on the country's sentiments." However, in December 2016, Tiffany reunited with the other cast members at the 15th KBS Entertainment Awards, where they opened the ceremony by performing "Shut Up".

== Awards and nominations ==
Year	Award	Category	Recipient	Result
2016	15th KBS Entertainment Awards	Top Excellence Award in Talk Show	Kim Sook	Won
2016	15th KBS Entertainment Awards	Top Excellence Award in Variety Show	Ra Mi-ran	Won
2016	15th KBS Entertainment Awards	Excellence Award in Variety Show	Hong Jin-kyung	Nominated
2016	15th KBS Entertainment Awards	Best Newcomer in Variety Show	Min Hyo-rin	Won
2016	15th KBS Entertainment Awards	Best Newcomer in Variety Show	Jessi	Nominated
2016	15th KBS Entertainment Awards	Best Writer	Ji Hyun-suk	Won
2016	15th KBS Entertainment Awards	PD Special Award	Park Jin-young	Won
2017	53rd Baeksang Arts Awards	Best Variety Performer – Female	Kim Sook	Nominated
