= Problem Child in House =

South Korean variety show

- Promotional poster
- Hangul: 옥탑방의 문제아들
- RR: Oktapbangui munjeadeul
- MR: Okt'appangŭi munjeadŭl
- Genre: Variety show Quiz show
- Starring: Song Eun-i; Kim Sook; Kim Jong-kook; Joo Woo-jae; Yang Se-chan; Hong Jin-kyung
- Country of origin: South Korea
- Original language: Korean
- No. of seasons: 2
- No. of episodes: 260 + 2 pilots (list of episodes)

Production
- Production location: South Korea
- Running time: 90 minutes
- Production companies: KBS Entertainment Production; FNC Production

Original release
- Network: KBS2
- Release: November 7, 2018 – present

Problem Child in House (Korean: 옥탑방의 문제아들, lit. Problem Children in the Rooftop Room) was a South Korean variety program that aired on KBS2 starting November 7, 2018. The program also aired on KBS World with English subtitles. The show ended in mid-January 2024, and return for season 2 in April 2025.

== Synopsis ==
In this quiz show, the five hosts and the guest(s) put their general knowledge to the test. They must correctly answer ten trivia questions given by the production team before they are allowed to leave the rooftop. They are not allowed to use their phones to find the answers on the internet.

== Changes in running time ==
| Air date | Air time |
Pilot
| September 25, 2018 | 17.50 – 19.10 |
| September 26, 2018 | 18.30 – 19.50 |
Air on every Wednesday
| November 7, 2018 – April 3, 2019 | Part 1: 23.10 – 23.55 |
| November 7, 2018 – April 3, 2019 | Part 2: 23.55 – 00.40 |
Air on every Monday
| April 8, 2019 – December 23, 2019 | 20.55 – 22.00 |
| January 6, 2020 – March 30, 2020 | Part 1: 20.55 – 21.30 |
| January 6, 2020 – March 30, 2020 | Part 2: 21.30 – 22.10 |
| April 6, 2020 – June 22, 2020 | Part 1: 20.50 – 21.25 |
| April 6, 2020 – June 22, 2020 | Part 2: 21.25 – 22.00 |
Air on every Tuesday
| June 30, 2020 – April 12, 2022 | Part 1: 22.40 – 23.15 |
| June 30, 2020 – April 12, 2022 | Part 2: 23.15 – 23.50 |
Air on every Wednesday
| April 20, 2022 – January 17, 2024 | 20.30 – 21.50 |
Air on every Thursday
| April 3, 2025 – May 28, 2026 | 20.30 – 21.50 |
Air on every Friday
| June 5, 2026 – present | 21.40 – 23.00 |

== Cast ==
=== Current ===
| Name | Episode |
|---|---|
| Song Eun-i | 1–present |
| Kim Sook | 1–3, 5–present |
| Kim Jong-kook | 174 – present |
| Joo Woo-jae | 261-present |
| Yang Se-chan | 261-present |
| Hong Jin-kyung | 261-present |

=== Former ===
| Name | Episode |
|---|---|
| Kim Yong-man | 1–29, 32–173 |
| Min Kyung-hoon | 1-223 |
| Jung Hyung-don | 1–46, 49–105, 118–173, 176 – 260 |
| Lee Chan-won | 224 – 260 |

=== Special MC ===
| Name | Episode |
|---|---|
| Hong Jin-kyung | 4 |
| Kim Sung-joo | 30-31 |
| Moon Se-yoon | 47-48 |
| Kim Hee-chul (Super Junior) | 110, 112 – 117 |
| Jang Do-yeon | 196 |

== List of episodes ==
=== Series overview ===
| Year | Episodes | Originally aired | |
| Year | Episodes | First aired | Last aired |
|---|---|---|---|
| Pilot | 2 | September 25, 2018 | September 26, 2018 |
| 2018 | 8 | November 7, 2018 | December 26, 2018 |
| 2019 | 50 | January 2, 2019 | December 23, 2019 |
| 2020 | 52 | January 6, 2020 | December 29, 2020 |
| 2021 | 50 | January 5, 2021 | December 28, 2021 |
| 2022 | 48 | January 4, 2022 | December 28, 2022 |
| 2023 | 49 | January 4, 2023 | December 27, 2023 |
| 2024 | 3 | January 3, 2024 | January 17, 2024 |
| 2025 | 35 | April 3, 2025 | December 25, 2025 |
| 2026 | TBA | January 1, 2026 | TBA |

=== 2018 ===
Episode 1–8 + 2 pilots

| Episode# | Broadcast date | Guest(s) | Note(s) | Ref. |
|---|---|---|---|---|
| Pilot | September 25 | No guest(s) | | |
| Pilot | September 26 | No guest(s) | | |
| 1 | November 7 | No guest(s) | | |
| 2 | November 14 | No guest(s) | | |
| 3 | November 21 | No guest(s) | | |
| 4 | November 28 | No guest(s) | Special MC: Hong Jin-kyung. Due to personal schedule, Kim Sook did not appear in this episode. | |
| 5 | December 5 | Kwak Dong-yeon | | |
| 6 | December 12 | Kim Jong-min | | |
| 7 | December 19 | Yoo Byung-jae | | |
| 8 | December 26 | Kim Shin-young, Shin Bong-sun | | |

=== 2019 ===
Episode 9–58

| Episode# | Broadcast date | Guest(s) | Notes | Ref. |
|---|---|---|---|---|
| 9 | January 2 | Moon Se-yoon | | |
| 10 | January 9 | Boom | | |
| 11 | January 16 | Lee Gi-kwang (Highlight) | | |
| 12 | January 23 | Kim Jun-hyun | | |
| 13 | January 30 | Heo Kyung-hwan | | |
| 14 | February 6 | Seo Jang-hoon | | |
| 15 | February 13 | Seo Jang-hoon | | |
| 16 | February 20 | Park Sung-kwang | | |
| 17 | February 27 | Kim Won-hee | | |
| 18 | March 6 | Lee Seung-yoon | | |
| 19 | March 13 | Key (Shinee) | | |
| 20 | March 20 | Mamamoo | | |
| 21 | March 27 | Kim Bo-sung | | |
| 22 | April 3 | Jo Jae-yoon | | |
| 23 | April 8 | Lee Hwi-jae | | |
| 24 | April 15 | Hong Jin-young | | |
| 25 | April 22 | Defconn | | |
| 26 | April 29 | Kim Sung-joo | | |
| 27 | May 6 | Im Ye-jin | | |
| 28 | May 13 | Yang Hee-eun | | |
| 29 | May 20 | Oh Sang-jin, Kim So-young | | |
| 30 | May 27 | Davichi | Special MC: Kim Sung-joo (Note: Standing in for Kim Yong-man who was absent due to health issues.) | |
| 31 | June 3 | Tyler Rasch | Special MC: Kim Sung-joo | |
| 32 | June 10 | Noh Sa-yeon | | |
| 33 | June 17 | Kim Hee-chul (Super Junior) | | |
| 34 | June 24 | Seo Kyung-seok | | |
| 35 | July 1 | Lee Hong-gi (F.T. Island) | | |
| 36 | July 8 | Hwang Kwang-hee | | |
| 37 | July 15 | Yoon Jung-soo | | |
| 38 | July 22 | Lee Deok-hwa | | |
| Special | July 29 | —N/a | | |
| 39 | August 5 | Chungha | | |
| 40 | August 12 | Kim Wan-sun, Kim Jung-nam (Turbo) | | |
| 41 | August 19 | Oh Chang-seok, Yoon So-yi | | |
| 42 | August 26 | Seo Min-jung | | |
| 43 | September 2 | Park Ji-sun | | |
| 44 | September 9 | Hong Hyun-hee, Jason | | |
| 45 | September 16 | Hur Jae | | |
| 46 | September 23 | Ahn Young-mi | | |
| 47 | September 30 | Baek Ji-young | Special MC: Moon Se-yoon (Note: Standing in for Jeong Hyeong-don who was absent due to personal matters.) | |
| 48 | October 7 | Kangnam | Special MC: Moon Se-yoon | |
| 49 | October 21 | Ahn Hyun-mo | | |
| 50 | October 28 | Sunwoo Sun | | |
| 51 | November 4 | Kim Dong-hyun | | |
| 52 | November 11 | Jang Yoon-jeong, Do Kyung-wan | | |
| 53 | November 18 | Kim Seung-hyun, Kim Eon-joong | | |
| 54 | November 25 | Na Moon-hee, Kim Su-an | | |
| 55 | December 2 | Kim Tae-gyun | | |
| 56 | December 9 | Park Ho-san | | |
| 57 | December 16 | g.o.d (Son Ho-young, Kim Tae-woo) | | |
| 58 | December 23 | Lee Hye-sung, Kim Do-yeon, Park Ji-won | | |

=== 2020 ===
Episode 59–110

| Episode# | Broadcast date | Guest(s) | Notes | Ref. |
|---|---|---|---|---|
| 59 | January 6 | Tei, Lee Seok-hoon (SG Wannabe) | | |
| 60 | January 13 | Kim Young-ok | | |
| 61 | January 20 | Seo Hyun-chul | | |
| 62 | January 27 | Rowoon (SF9), Kim Kang-hoon | | |
| 63 | February 3 | Kang Hyung-wook | | |
| 64 | February 10 | Tae Jin-ah, Lee Moo-song | | |
| 65 | February 17 | Choo Dae-yeob | | |
| 66 | February 24 | Kim Soo-yong, Lee Yeon-soo | | |
| 67 | March 2 | Sechs Kies (Eun Ji-won, Jang Su-won) | | |
| 68 | March 9 | Jang Hyun-sung | | |
| 69 | March 16 | Jang Young-ran, Lee Ha-jung | | |
| 70 | March 23 | Kwon Il-yong | | |
| 71 | March 30 | Cha Hwa-yeon | | |
| 72 | April 6 | Yang Chi-seung | | |
| 73 | April 13 | Park Hyun-bin | | |
| 74 | April 20 | Jin Se-yeon | | |
| 75 | April 27 | Yoo Min-sang, Kim Min-kyung | | |
| 76 | May 4 | Jo Kwon (2AM), Seo Eun-kwang (BtoB) | | |
| 77 | May 11 | Park Eun-hye, Kim Kyung-ran | | |
| 78 | May 18 | Sung Si-kyung | | |
| 79 | May 25 | Shownu (Monsta X), JR (NU'EST) | | |
| 80 | June 1 | Kim Chang-ok | | |
| 81 | June 8 | DinDin, Ravi (VIXX) | | |
| 82 | June 15 | Byun Young-joo | | |
| 83 | June 22 | Yoon Doo-joon (Highlight) | | |
| 84 | June 30 | Lee Yoo-ri, Lee Bong-geun | | |
| 85 | July 7 | Jang Yoon-ju | | |
| 86 | July 14 | Sean (Jinusean), Lee Young-pyo | | |
| 87 | July 21 | Jang Sung-kyu | | |
| 88 | July 28 | Park Joon-hyung, Kim Ji-hye | | |
| 89 | August 4 | Lee Soo-jung | | |
| 90 | August 11 | Choi Soo-jong, Lee Chang-wook | | |
| 91 | August 18 | Hyun Joo-yup | | |
| 92 | August 25 | Seo Yi-sook | | |
| 93 | September 1 | Lee Hee-joon | | |
| 94 | September 8 | Yang Joon-il | | |
| 95 | September 15 | Park Jung-soo | | |
| 96 | September 22 | Jo Woo-jong, Jung Da-eun | | |
| 97 | September 29 | Kang Eun-tak. Uhm Hyun-kyung | | |
| 98 | October 6 | Jessi | | |
| 99 | October 13 | Im Chang-jung | | |
| 100 | October 20 | Kim Han-gil, Choi Myung-gil | | |
| 101 | October 27 | Esom, Go Ah-sung, Park Hye-su | | |
| 102 | November 3 | Ham Yon-ji, Aiki | | |
| 103 | November 10 | Lee Juck | | |
| 104 | November 17 | CNBLUE | | |
| 105 | November 24 | Lee Sang-yi | | |
| 106 | December 1 | Jung Sang-hoon | Jung Hyung-don did not appear in this episode. | |
| 107 | December 8 | Kim Hak-rae, Im Mi-sook | Jung Hyung-don did not appear in this episode. | |
| 108 | December 15 | Jang Ye-won, Jang Ye-in | Jung Hyung-don did not appear in this episode. | |
| 109 | December 22 | Oh Hyun-kyung, Kim Soo-ro | Jung Hyung-don did not appear in this episode. | |
| 110 | December 29 | Sandara Park, Lee Ho-cheol | Special MC: Kim Hee-chul | |

=== 2021 ===
Episode 111–160

| Episode# | Broadcast date | Guest(s) | Notes | Ref. |
|---|---|---|---|---|
| 111 | January 5 | John Lee, Yoo Su-jin | | |
| 112 | January 12 | Ha Do-kwon, Yoon Jong-hoon | Special MC: Kim Hee-chul | |
| 113 | January 19 | Bae Yoon-jung, Jaejae | Special MC: Kim Hee-chul | |
| 114 | January 26 | Yang Jae-jin, Yang Jae-woong | Special MC: Kim Hee-chul | |
| 115 | February 2 | Eum Moon-suk, Kim Young-kwang | Special MC: Kim Hee-chul | |
| 116 | February 9 | Epik High | Special MC: Kim Hee-chul | |
| 117 | February 16 | Oh Mi-hee, Lee So-yeon, Choi Yeo-jin | Special MC: Kim Hee-chul | |
| 118 | February 23 | Minho (Shinee) | | |
| 119 | March 2 | Jang Hang-jun | | |
| 120 | March 9 | Hong Eun-hee, Jeon Hye-bin, Go Won-hee | | |
| 121 | March 16 | Bak Goon, Hong Jam-eon | | |
| 122 | March 23 | Sayuri Fujita | | |
| 123 | March 30 | Oh Eun-young | | |
| 124 | April 6 | Kang Daniel | | |
| 125 | April 13 | Jang Na-ra, Jung Yong-hwa (CNBLUE) | | |
| 126 | April 20 | Brave Girls | | |
| 127 | April 27 | Kim Won-hyo, Shim Jin-hwa | | |
| 128 | May 4 | Lee Seung-chul | | |
| 129 | May 11 | Jin Goo | | |
| 130 | May 18 | Hur Jae, Heo Ung, Heo Hoon | | |
| 131 | May 25 | Kim Seung-woo, Ahn Jae-wook | | |
| 132 | June 1 | Ra Mi-ran, Mirani | | |
| 133 | June 8 | Yoo Jun-sang, Jung Sung-hwa | | |
| 134 | June 15 | Park Hoon, Jin Ki-joo, Wi Ha-joon | | |
| 135 | June 22 | KCM, Kim Yong-jun (SG Wannabe) | | |
| 136 | June 29 | Go Doo-shim, Ji Hyun-woo | | |
| 137 | July 6 | So Yi-hyun | | |
| 138 | July 13 | Ha Jae-sook, Ok Ja-yeon | | |
| 139 | July 20 | Jeong Jun-ha | | |
| 140 | August 3 | Cha Tae-hyun | | |
| 141 | August 10 | Myung Se-bin | | |
| 142 | August 17 | Kim Dong-hwan, Syuka | | |
| 143 | August 24 | Song Seok-won, Namgoong In | | |
| 144 | August 31 | Park Joon-young | | |
| 145 | September 7 | Jee Seok-jin | | |
| 146 | September 14 | Lee Dong-jin | | |
| 147 | September 28 | Choi Young-jae, Hwang Choong-won | | |
| 148 | October 5 | Jang Young-nam | | |
| 149 | October 12 | Ji Hyun-woo, Lee Se-hee | | |
| 150 | October 19 | Park Sung-hoon, Jeon So-min | | |
| 151 | October 26 | Kim Jae-won | | |
| 152 | November 2 | Choi Tae-sung, Jung Seung-je | | |
| 153 | November 9 | Kim Yeo-jin, Yoo Sun | | |
| 154 | November 16 | Kim Sung-ryung, Lee Hak-joo | | |
| 155 | November 23 | Kim Kap-soo, Jang Min-ho | | |
| 156 | November 30 | Lee Jae Myung | | |
| 157 | December 7 | Yoon Seok-youl | | |
| 158 | December 14 | Haha | | |
| 159 | December 21 | Pak Se-ri | | |
| 160 | December 28 | Choi Won-young, Kim Ki-bang | | |

=== 2022 ===
Episode 161–208

| Episode# | Broadcast date | Guest(s) | Notes | Ref. |
|---|---|---|---|---|
| 161 | January 4 | Na Tae-joo | | |
| 162 | January 11 | Kwon Yul, Park Ha-sun | | |
| 163 | January 18 | Kim Young-chul, Lee Geun-chul/Jake Lee | | |
| 164 | January 25 | Moon Se-yoon | | |
| 165 | February 15 | Apink | Yoon Bo-mi and Son Na-eun are absent | |
| 166 | February 22 | Yeo Esther, Kim So-hyung | | |
| 167 | March 1 | Han Chae-young, Ji Yi-soo, Koo Ja-sung | | |
| 168 | March 8 | Abhishek Gupta/Lucky, Jonathan Yiombi | | |
| 169 | March 15 | Shim Yong-hwan, Kwak Jae-sik | | |
| 170 | March 22 | Chang Ki-ha | | |
| 171 | March 29 | Park Ji-young, Bae Da-bin | | |
| 172 | April 5 | Lee Jung-eun | | |
| 173 | April 12 | Kim Byeong-ok | Final regular appearance of Kim Yong-man. | |
| 174 | April 20 | Song Ji-hyo | First regular appearance of Kim Jong-kook. | |
| 175 | April 27 | Jang Hyuk | | |
| 176 | May 4 | Kwak Do-won, Yoon Doo-joon (Highlight) | | |
| 177 | May 11 | Jo Hye-ryun | | |
| 178 | May 18 | Sung Hoon | | |
| 179 | May 25 | Seo Kyung-seok, Park Jong-bok | | |
| 180 | June 1 | Kim Young-ha | | |
| 181 | June 8 | Lee Min-young, Lee Yu-ri | | |
| 182 | June 15 | Na Moon-hee, Choi Jung-hoon (Jannabi) | | |
| 183 | June 22 | Jang Do-yeon | | |
| 184 | June 29 | Hwang Soo-kyung, Kang Soo-jung | | |
| 185 | July 6 | Young Tak | | |
| 186 | July 13 | Ji Sang-ryeol, KCM | | |
| 187 | July 20 | Lee Ji-hye | | |
| 188 | July 27 | Hong Seok-cheon, Kim Ji-min | | |
| 189 | August 3 | Bong Tae-gyu | | |
| 190 | August 17 | So Yoo-jin, Kim Ho-young | | |
| 191 | August 24 | Kim Sook, Baek Ji-young | | |
| 192 | August 31 | Kim Moon-jeong, Im Chang-jung | | |
| 193 | September 7 | Jung Eun-pyo, Jung Ji-woong | | |
| 194 | September 14 | Lee Sang-jun, Kim Hae-jun, Lee Eun-ji | | |
| 195 | September 21 | Koyote | | |
| 196 | September 28 | Ra Mi-ran, Song Sae-byeok | | |
| 197 | October 5 | Park So-hyun, Sandara Park | | |
| 198 | October 12 | Jang Young-ran, Han Chang | | |
| 199 | October 19 | Son Jong-hak, Jang Hang-jun | | |
| 200 | October 26 | Sungjin, Ha Sung-yong | | |
| 201 | November 2 | Kim Wan-sun, Choi Sung-kook | | |
| 202 | November 9 | Jeon Soo-kyeong, Lee Jong-hyuk | | |
| 203 | November 16 | Kim Kwang-kyu | | |
| 204 | November 30 | Lee Guk-joo, Song Hae-na | | |
| 205 | December 7 | Jeong Dong-won | | |
| 206 | December 14 | Kim Young-min, Jinyoung (Got7) | | |
| 207 | December 21 | Kim Bum-soo | | |
| 208 | December 28 | Cha Tae-hyun, Kwak Sun-young | | |

=== 2023 ===
Episode 209–257

| Episode# | Broadcast date | Guest(s) | Notes | Ref. |
|---|---|---|---|---|
| 209 | January 4 | Cha In-pyo | | |
| 210 | January 11 | Lee Kyu-hyung | | |
| 211 | January 18 | Choo Shin-soo | | |
| 212 | January 25 | Byul, Seo In-young | | |
| 213 | February 1 | Hong Sung-woo, Han Sang-bo | Min Kyung-hoon absent | |
| 214 | February 8 | Lee Soo-ji, Jasson | Min Kyung-hoon absent | |
| 215 | February 15 | Lee Chan-won | Min Kyung-hoon absent | |
| 216 | February 22 | Kim Mi-kyung | | |
| 217 | March 1 | Shin Hyun-joon, Kim Min-kyung, Lee Moon-sik | | |
| 218 | March 8 | Lee Jang-won, Joo Woo-jae | Jung Hyung-don absent | |
| 219 | March 15 | Pyo Chang-won, Kwon Il-yong | Jung Hyung-don absent | |
| 220 | March 22 | Ryu-jin, Choi Dae-chul | | |
| 221 | March 29 | Kim Min-kyung, Oh Na-mi | | |
| 222 | April 5 | Joo Hyun-young, Choi Moon-hee, Kim Ah-young | | |
| 223 | April 12 | Kim Ji-hye, Yeom Kyung-hwan | Final regular appearance Min Kyung-hoon | |
| 224 | April 19 | Oh Yoon-ah, Lee So-yeon | First regular appearance Lee Chan-won | |
| 225 | April 26 | Lee Geum-hee | | |
| 226 | May 3 | Kang Susie | | |
| 227 | May 10 | Kim Kyu-il | | |
| 228 | May 17 | DinDin, Lee Mi-joo | | |
| 229 | May 24 | Hwang Kwang-hee, Choo Sung-hoon | | |
| 230 | May 31 | Kim Sun-young, Lee Yoon-ji | | |
| 231 | June 7 | Park Ji-sun | | |
| 232 | June 14 | Kwaktube, Son Mina | | |
| 233 | June 21 | Park Mi-ok | | |
| 234 | June 28 | Park Sung-woong, Park Sun-ho | | |
| 235 | July 5 | Lee Hye-young, Yoo Se-yoon | | |
| 236 | July 12 | Park Ji-hoon, Yang Na-rae | | |
| 237 | July 26 | Park Seon-yeong, Park Sun-young | | |
| 238 | August 2 | Sung Si-kyung | | |
| 239 | August 9 | Sung Si-kyung | | |
| 240 | August 16 | Lee Sang-yeob, Kim So-hye | | |
| 241 | August 23 | Choi Tae-seong | | |
| 242 | August 30 | Jonathan, Patricia | | |
| 243 | September 6 | Kim Se-jeong | | |
| 244 | September 13 | Uee, Ha Jun | | |
| 245 | September 20 | Orbit | | |
| 246 | Oktober 11 | Jeon No-min, Park Joon-geum | | |
| 247 | Oktober 18 | Han Hye-jin, Im Soo-hyang, Park Ha-sun | | |
| 248 | Oktober 25 | Kim So-hyun, Kim Seong-kwon | | |
| 249 | November 1 | Jang Seo-hee | | |
| 250 | November 8 | Seol Chae-hyeon, Kim Myeong-cheol | | |
| 251 | November 15 | Lee Joo-young, Crush | | |
| 252 | November 22 | Jeon Han-gil | | |
| 253 | November 29 | Jeon Han-gil | | |
| 254 | December 6 | Son Bum-soo, Jin Yang-hye | | |
| 255 | December 13 | Jung Hee-won | | |
| 256 | December 20 | Kim Nam-il, Kim Bo-min | | |
| 257 | December 27 | Song Jae-rim, Choi Soo-young | | |

=== 2024 ===
Episode 258–260

| Episode# | Broadcast date | Guest(s) | Notes | Ref. |
|---|---|---|---|---|
| 258 | January 3 | Shim Hyung-tak, Kangnam | | |
| 259 | January 10 | Yang Se-hyung | | |
| 260 | January 17 | No Guest | | |

=== 2025 ===
Episode 261–295

| Episode# | Broadcast date | Guest(s) | Notes | Ref. |
|---|---|---|---|---|
| 261 | April 3 | | | |
| 262 | April 10 | Jo Se-ho, Nam Chang-hee | | |
| 263 | April 17 | Song Ga-in | | |
| 264 | April 24 | Lee Kyung-kyu | | |
| 265 | May 1 | Lee Jun-young, Jung Eun-ji | | |
| 266 | May 8 | Calm Down Man | | |
| 267 | May 15 | Kang Ji-yeong, Kim Dae-ho | | |
| 268 | May 23 | Park Min-cheol, Lee Ho-seon | | |
| 269 | May 29 | Lee Min-jung, Kim Jae-won | | |
| 270 | June 5 | Choi Kang-hee | | |
| 271 | June 12 | Jo Hye-ryun, Peppertones | | |
| 272 | June 19 | Kim Jong-min | | |
| 273 | June 26 | Seonwoo Yong-yeo | | |
| 274 | July 3 | Shindong, Cho Kyu-hyun | | |
| 275 | July 10 | Lee Joon, Hwang Kwang-hee | | |
| 276 | July 17 | Han Suk-joon, Kim So-young | | |
| 277 | July 31 | Park Seo-jin | | |
| 278 | August 7 | Lee Tae-ran | | |
| 279 | August 14 | Ryu Soo-young, Jung Il-woo | | |
| 280 | August 21 | Ko Myung-hwan | | |
| 281 | August 28 | Hwangbo, Solbi | | |
| 282 | September 4 | Lee Dae-ho, Zo Zazz | | |
| 283 | September 11 | Park Yeong-gyu | | |
| 284 | September 18 | Yoo Seung-ho | | |
| 285 | September 25 | Eugene | | |
| 286 | Oktober 2 | Yoon Jung-soo, Go Bon-seung | | |
| 287 | Oktober 16 | Jin Tae-hyun, Park Si-eun | | |
| 288 | Oktober 23 | Na Min-ae | | |
| 289 | November 6 | Jung Ae-ri, Geum Bo-ra | | |
| 290 | November 13 | Lee Seung-chul | | |
| 291 | November 20 | Yoo Jun-sang, Jung Moon-sung | | |
| 292 | November 27 | Han Hye-jin | | |
| 293 | December 4 | Yoo Sun, Oh Min-suk | | |
| 294 | December 11 | Lee Kyung-sil, Lee Geum-hee | | |
| 295 | December 25 | Kim Bung-nyeon | | |

=== 2026 ===
Episode 296–present

| Episode | Broadcast date | Guest(s) | Notes | Ref. |
|---|---|---|---|---|
| 296 | January 1 | Lee Si-hyeong, Yoon Bang-bu | | |
| 297 | January 8 | Kim Young-ok, Ha Hee-ra | | |
| 298 | January 15 | Hwang Shin-hye, Jang Yoon-jeong | | |
| 299 | January 22 | Jung Ho-young, Kwon Sung-jun | | |
| 300 | January 29 | Jeon Hyun-moo | | |
| 301 | February 5 | Kim Seung-soo, So Yi-hyun | | |
| 302 | February 12 | Yoon Yoo-sun, Lee Sung-ho | | |
| 303 | February 19 | Yoon Yoo-sun, Lee Sung-ho | | |
| 304 | February 26 | Jung Ji-sun, Lee Moon-jung | | |
| 305 | March 12 | Park Jin-hee, Kim Hee-jung | | |
| 306 | March 19 | Park Shin-yang | | |
| 307 | March 26 | Park Sung-woong, Lee Soo-kyung | | |
| 308 | April 2 | Park Eun-yeong, Kim Si-hyeon | | |
| 309 | April 9 | K.Will, Ahn Jae-hyun | | |
| 310 | April 16 | Kim Ji-youn, Choo Sung-il | | |
| 311 | April 23 | Kim Tae-kyun, Park Yong-taik | | |
| 312 | April 31 | Kim Shin-young | | |
| 313 | May 7 | Yoon Sang, Lee Hyun-woo, Kim Hyeon-cheol. | | |
| 314 | May 14 | Kim Dae-sik | | |
| 315 | May 21 | Yang Sang-guk, BiBi | | |
| 316 | June 28 | Son Tae-jin, Park Ji-hyeon | | |
| 317 | June 5 | Jang Keun-suk | | |
| 318 | June 26 | Yoon Jong-shin, Jang Hang-jun | | |
| 319 | July 3 | Yoon Jong-shin, Jang Hang-jun | | |
| 320 | July 10 | Namkoong Min | | |
| 321 | July 17 | Jin Seon-kyu, Lee Hee-jun | | |
| 322 | July 24 | Yeon Jung-hoon | | |
| 323 | August 7 | Jung Hae-in, Ha Young | | |
| 324 | August 14 | | | |
| 325 | August 21 | | | |
| 326 | August 28 | | | |
| 327 | September 4 | | | |
| 328 | September 11 | | | |
| 329 | | | | |
| 330 | | | | |
| 331 | | | | |

== Rating ==
- In the ratings below, the highest rating for the show will be in red, and the lowest rating for the show will be in blue each year.
- Ratings listed below are the individual corner ratings of Problem Child in House. (Note: Individual corner ratings do not include commercial time, which regular ratings include.)

=== 2018 ===
List of episodes in 2018 (episode 1–8 + 2 pilots)

| Ep. # | Original airdate | Nielsen ratings |
| Ep. # | Original airdate | Nationwide |
|---|---|---|
| Pilot | September 25 | 3.2% |
| Pilot | September 26 | 3.9% |
| 1 | November 7 | 2.2% |
| 1 | November 7 | 1.7% |
| 2 | November 14 | 1.6% |
| 2 | November 14 | 1.6% |
| 3 | November 21 | 1.6% |
| 3 | November 21 | 1.3% |
| 4 | November 28 | 1.5% |
| 4 | November 28 | 1.4% |
| 5 | December 5 | 1.6% |
| 5 | December 5 | 1.2% |
| 6 | December 12 | 1.4% |
| 6 | December 12 | 1.6% |
| 7 | December 19 | 1.9% |
| 7 | December 19 | 2.0% |
| 8 | December 26 | 1.9% |
| 8 | December 26 | 2.5% |

=== 2019 ===
List of episodes in 2019 (episode 9–58)

| Ep. # | Original airdate | Nielsen ratings |
| Ep. # | Original airdate | Nationwide |
|---|---|---|
| 9 | January 2 | 2.2% |
| 10 | January 9 | 2.2% |
| 11 | January 16 | 1.4% |
| 11 | January 16 | 1.4% |
| 12 | January 23 | 2.5% |
| 12 | January 23 | 1.8% |
| 13 | January 30 | 2.6% |
| 13 | January 30 | 2.6% |
| 14 | February 6 | 2.8% |
| 14 | February 6 | 3.7% |
| 15 | February 13 | 3.2% |
| 15 | February 13 | 3.6% |
| 16 | February 20 | 2.7% |
| 16 | February 20 | 2.8% |
| 17 | February 27 | 4.1% |
| 17 | February 27 | 3.7% |
| 18 | March 6 | 3.2% |
| 18 | March 6 | 2.9% |
| 19 | March 13 | 3.0% |
| 19 | March 13 | 2.8% |
| 20 | March 20 | 2.9% |
| 20 | March 20 | 2.9% |
| 21 | March 27 | 2.7% |
| 21 | March 27 | 2.7% |
| 22 | April 3 | 3.0% |
| 22 | April 3 | 2.8% |
| 23 | April 8 | 4.0% |
| 24 | April 15 | 4.9% |
| 25 | April 22 | 3.6% |
| 26 | April 29 | 4.4% |
| 27 | May 6 | 5.4% |
| 28 | May 13 | 4.5% |
| 29 | May 20 | 4.3% |
| 30 | May 27 | 4.3% |
| 31 | June 3 | 4.3% |
| 32 | June 10 | 4.0% |
| 33 | June 17 | 3.9% |
| 34 | June 24 | 4.6% |
| 35 | July 1 | 4.0% |
| 36 | July 8 | 4.1% |
| 37 | July 15 | 4.1% |
| 38 | July 22 | 4.4% |
| Special | July 29 | 3.4% |
| 39 | August 5 | 3.8% |
| 40 | August 12 | 4.0% |
| 41 | August 19 | 4.2% |
| 42 | August 26 | 3.8% |
| 43 | September 2 | 4.5% |
| 44 | September 9 | 4.2% |
| 45 | September 16 | 4.1% |
| 46 | September 23 | 3.4% |
| 47 | September 30 | 4.4% |
| 48 | October 7 | 4.9% |
| 49 | October 21 | 4.6% |
| 50 | October 28 | 4.5% |
| 51 | November 4 | 4.5% |
| 52 | November 11 | 6.1% |
| 53 | November 18 | 6.4% |
| 54 | November 25 | 4.7% |
| 55 | December 2 | 4.8% |
| 56 | December 9 | 5.2% |
| 57 | December 16 | 4.8% |
| 58 | December 23 | 5.6% |
| 58 | December 23 | 6.5% |

=== 2020 ===
List of episodes in 2020 (episode 59–110)

| Ep. # | Original airdate | Nielsen ratings |
| Ep. # | Original airdate | Nationwide |
|---|---|---|
| 59 | January 6 | 4.1% |
| 59 | January 6 | 5.5% |
| 60 | January 13 | 5.6% |
| 60 | January 13 | 7.0% |
| 61 | January 20 | 4.7% |
| 61 | January 20 | 6.1% |
| 62 | January 27 | 4.2% |
| 62 | January 27 | 5.3% |
| 63 | February 3 | 4.8% |
| 63 | February 3 | 6.5% |
| 64 | February 10 | 3.8% |
| 64 | February 10 | 5.5% |
| 65 | February 17 | 4.2% |
| 65 | February 17 | 5.6% |
| 66 | February 24 | 4.4% |
| 66 | February 24 | 5.1% |
| 67 | March 2 | 4.2% |
| 67 | March 2 | 7.5% |
| 68 | March 9 | 4.3% |
| 68 | March 9 | 6.5% |
| 69 | March 16 | 4.1% |
| 69 | March 16 | 6.0% |
| 70 | March 23 | 4.4% |
| 70 | March 23 | 6.5% |
| 71 | March 30 | 5.5% |
| 71 | March 30 | 7.3% |
| 72 | April 6 | 4.3% |
| 72 | April 6 | 6.6% |
| 73 | April 13 | 4.6% |
| 73 | April 13 | 6.6% |
| 74 | April 20 | 4.2% |
| 74 | April 20 | 5.9% |
| 75 | April 27 | 4.3% |
| 75 | April 27 | 7.3% |
| 76 | May 4 | 4.7% |
| 76 | May 4 | 6.5% |
| 77 | May 11 | 4.4% |
| 77 | May 11 | 6.3% |
| 78 | May 18 | 4.9% |
| 78 | May 18 | 7.7% |
| 79 | May 25 | 3.7% |
| 79 | May 25 | 4.9% |
| 80 | June 1 | 4.7% |
| 80 | June 1 | 7.0% |
| 81 | June 8 | 3.9% |
| 81 | June 8 | 5.8% |
| 82 | June 15 | 4.1% |
| 82 | June 15 | 5.9% |
| 83 | June 22 | 4.5% |
| 83 | June 22 | 6.0% |
| 84 | June 30 | 3.1% |
| 84 | June 30 | 3.2% |
| 85 | July 7 | 3.1% |
| 85 | July 7 | 3.4% |
| 86 | July 14 | 3.0% |
| 86 | July 14 | 3.6% |
| 87 | July 21 | 2.6% |
| 87 | July 21 | 2.8% |
| 88 | July 28 | 2.7% |
| 88 | July 28 | 3.5% |
| 89 | August 4 | 3.3% |
| 89 | August 4 | 3.8% |
| 90 | August 11 | 2.9% |
| 90 | August 11 | 3.2% |
| 91 | August 18 | 2.7% |
| 91 | August 18 | 3.1% |
| 92 | August 25 | 4.4% |
| 92 | August 25 | 4.5% |
| 93 | September 1 | 3.7% |
| 93 | September 1 | 3.8% |
| 94 | September 8 | 3.1% |
| 94 | September 8 | 3.7% |
| 95 | September 15 | 3.4% |
| 95 | September 15 | 3.8% |
| 96 | September 22 | 3.4% |
| 96 | September 22 | 3.8% |
| 97 | September 29 | 3.3% |
| 97 | September 29 | 3.8% |
| 98 | October 6 | 3.8% |
| 98 | October 6 | 4.0% |
| 99 | October 13 | 3.1% |
| 99 | October 13 | 3.3% |
| 100 | October 20 | 3.6% |
| 100 | October 20 | 3.6% |
| 101 | October 27 | 2.2% |
| 101 | October 27 | 3.0% |
| 102 | November 3 | 3.0% |
| 102 | November 3 | 3.7% |
| 103 | November 10 | 2.4% |
| 103 | November 10 | 2.5% |
| 104 | November 17 | 3.1% |
| 104 | November 17 | 3.3% |
| 105 | November 24 | 3.5% |
| 105 | November 24 | 4.4% |
| 106 | December 1 | 3.4% |
| 106 | December 1 | 4.4% |
| 107 | December 8 | 3.7% |
| 107 | December 8 | 4.1% |
| 108 | December 15 | 3.0% |
| 108 | December 15 | 3.6% |
| 109 | December 22 | 3.5% |
| 109 | December 22 | 4.0% |
| 110 | December 29 | 3.5% |
| 110 | December 29 | 3.8% |

=== 2021 ===
List of episodes in 2021 (episode 111–160)

| Ep. # | Original airdate | Nielsen ratings |
| Ep. # | Original airdate | Nationwide |
|---|---|---|
| 111 | January 5 | 4.4% |
| 111 | January 5 | 6.1% |
| 112 | January 12 | 3.3% |
| 112 | January 12 | 4.4% |
| 113 | January 19 | 3.3% |
| 113 | January 19 | 3.7% |
| 114 | January 26 | 4.3% |
| 114 | January 26 | 5.1% |
| 115 | February 2 | 3.7% |
| 115 | February 2 | 4.7% |
| 116 | February 9 | 4.1% |
| 116 | February 9 | 4.2% |
| 117 | February 16 | 2.8% |
| 117 | February 16 | 3.0% |
| 118 | February 23 | 3.1% |
| 118 | February 23 | 3.7% |
| 119 | March 2 | 3.9% |
| 119 | March 2 | 4.4% |
| 120 | March 9 | 3.3% |
| 120 | March 9 | 3.7% |
| 121 | March 16 | 3.4% |
| 121 | March 16 | 4.4% |
| 122 | March 23 | 3.2% |
| 122 | March 23 | 3.1% |
| 123 | March 30 | 2.6% |
| 123 | March 30 | 3.9% |
| 124 | April 6 | 2.8% |
| 124 | April 6 | 3.6% |
| 125 | April 13 | 3.0% |
| 125 | April 13 | 3.6% |
| 126 | April 20 | 2.3% |
| 126 | April 20 | 2.6% |
| 127 | April 27 | 2.6% |
| 127 | April 27 | 3.3% |
| 128 | May 4 | 2.9% |
| 128 | May 4 | 3.8% |
| 129 | May 11 | 3.1% |
| 129 | May 11 | 3.7% |
| 130 | May 18 | 3.2% |
| 130 | May 18 | 4.0% |
| 131 | May 25 | 3.4% |
| 131 | May 25 | 4.4% |
| 132 | June 1 | 2.8% |
| 132 | June 1 | 3.9% |
| 133 | June 8 | 2.7% |
| 133 | June 8 | 3.4% |
| 134 | June 15 | 2.3% |
| 134 | June 15 | 2.8% |
| 135 | June 22 | 2.7% |
| 135 | June 22 | 3.7% |
| 136 | June 29 | 2.4% |
| 136 | June 29 | 3.5% |
| 137 | July 6 | 3.2% |
| 138 | July 13 | 3.3% |
| 139 | July 20 | 3.3% |
| 140 | August 3 | 5.3% |
| 141 | August 10 | 3.4% |
| 142 | August 17 | 4.0% |
| 143 | August 24 | 4.1% |
| 144 | August 31 | 4.3% |
| 145 | September 7 | 3.0% |
| 146 | September 14 | 3.1% |
| 147 | September 28 | 3.5% |
| 148 | October 5 | 3.3% |
| 149 | October 12 | 3.6% |
| 150 | October 19 | 3.6% |
| 151 | October 26 | 2.8% |
| 152 | November 2 | 3.5% |
| 153 | November 9 | 3.1% |
| 154 | November 16 | 3.4% |
| 155 | November 23 | 3.8% |
| 156 | November 30 | 4.4% |
| 157 | December 7 | 4.0% |
| 158 | December 14 | 2.7% |
| 159 | December 21 | 3.3% |
| 160 | December 28 | 2.5% |

=== 2022 ===
List of episodes in 2022 (episode 161–208)

| Ep. # | Original airdate | Nielsen ratings |
| Ep. # | Original airdate | Nationwide |
|---|---|---|
| 161 | January 4 | 2.5% |
| 162 | January 11 | 2.7% |
| 163 | January 18 | 2.7% |
| 164 | January 25 | 3.0% |
| 165 | February 15 | 1.6% |
| 166 | February 22 | 4.0% |
| 167 | March 1 | 2.7% |
| 168 | March 8 | 2.6% |
| 169 | March 15 | 2.6% |
| 170 | March 22 | 2.5% |
| 171 | March 29 | 2.3% |
| 172 | April 5 | 2.5% |
| 173 | April 12 | 2.5% |
| 174 | April 20 | 3.5% |
| 175 | April 27 | 4.0% |
| 176 | May 4 | 3.5% |
| 177 | May 11 | 5.2% |
| 178 | May 18 | 3.5% |
| 179 | May 25 | 3.6% |
| 180 | June 1 | 4.3% |
| 181 | June 8 | 2.6% |
| 182 | June 15 | 3.1% |
| 183 | June 22 | 3.2% |
| 184 | June 29 | 3.6% |
| 185 | July 6 | 3.1% |
| 186 | July 13 | 2.7% |
| 187 | July 20 | 2.2% |
| 188 | July 27 | 2.8% |
| 189 | August 3 | 2.7% |
| 190 | August 17 | 2.9% |
| 191 | August 24 | 3.4% |
| 192 | August 31 | 3.3% |
| 193 | September 7 | 3.5% |
| 194 | September 14 | 2.7% |
| 195 | September 21 | 3.6% |
| 196 | September 28 | 3.2% |
| 197 | October 5 | 3.7% |
| 198 | October 12 | 3.7% |
| 199 | October 19 | 2.8% |
| 200 | October 26 | 4.9% |
| 201 | November 2 | 4.0% |
| 202 | November 9 | 2.9% |
| 203 | November 16 | 4.3% |
| 204 | November 30 | 3.3% |
| 205 | December 7 | 3.6% |
| 206 | December 14 | 2.9% |
| 207 | December 21 | 2.5% |
| 208 | December 28 | 3.4% |

=== 2023 ===
List of episodes in 2023 (episode 209–257)

| Ep. # | Original airdate | Nielsen ratings |
| Ep. # | Original airdate | Nationwide |
|---|---|---|
| 209 | January 4 | 3.7% |
| 210 | January 11 | 2.7% |
| 211 | January 18 | 3.1% |
| 212 | January 25 | 2.9% |
| 213 | February 1 | 3.0% |
| 214 | February 8 | 3.4% |
| 215 | February 15 | 4.4% |
| 216 | February 22 | 3.1% |
| 217 | March 1 | 3.2% |
| 218 | March 8 | 3.7% |
| 219 | March 15 | 3.2% |
| 220 | March 22 | 2.7% |
| 221 | March 29 | 3.3% |
| 222 | April 5 | 2.5% |
| 223 | April 12 | 3.3% |
| 224 | April 19 | 3.1% |
| 225 | April 26 | 4.0% |
| 226 | May 3 | 4.2% |
| 227 | May 10 | 3.9% |
| 228 | May 17 | 3.2% |
| 229 | May 24 | 3.5% |
| 230 | May 31 | 4.0% |
| 231 | June 7 | 3.3% |
| 232 | June 14 | 4.3% |
| 233 | June 21 | 4.4% |
| 234 | June 28 | 4.7% |
| 235 | July 5 | 3.0% |
| 236 | July 12 | 4.5% |
| 237 | July 26 | 3.2% |
| 238 | August 2 | 3.3% |
| 239 | August 9 | 3.6% |
| 240 | August 16 | 2.7% |
| 241 | August 23 | 3.3% |
| 242 | August 30 | 2.8% |
| 243 | 2.9September 6 | 2.9% |
| 244 | September 13 | 3.0% |
| 245 | September 20 | 3.5% |
| 246 | October 11 | 3.5% |
| 247 | October 18 | 4.0% |
| 248 | October 25 | 4.5% |
| 249 | November 1 | 3.4% |
| 250 | November 8 | 3.7% |
| 251 | November 15 | 3.0% |
| 252 | November 22 | 3.5% |
| 253 | November 29 | 3.2% |
| 254 | December 6 | 4.2% |
| 255 | December 13 | 4.6% |
| 256 | December 20 | 4.0% |
| 257 | December 27 | 2.6% |

=== 2024 ===
List of episodes in 2024 (episode 258–260)

| Ep. # | Original airdate | Nielsen ratings |
| Ep. # | Original airdate | Nationwide |
|---|---|---|
| 258 | January 3 | 3.9% |
| 259 | January 10 | 3.5% |
| 260 | January 17 | 4.3% |

=== 2025 ===
List of episodes in 2025 (episode 261–295)

| Ep. # | Original airdate | Nielsen ratings |
| Ep. # | Original airdate | Nationwide |
|---|---|---|
| 261 | April 3 | 2.6% |
| 262 | April 10 | 2.8% |
| 263 | April 17 | 3.1% |
| 264 | April 24 | 2.9% |
| 265 | May 1 | 2.2% |
| 266 | May 8 | 2.2% |
| 267 | May 15 | 2.8% |
| 268 | May 22 | 4.1% |
| 269 | May 29 | 2.2% |
| 270 | June 5 | 2.3% |
| 271 | June 12 | 2.6% |
| 272 | June 19 | 3.2% |
| 273 | June 26 | 2.9% |
| 274 | July 3 | 3.1% |
| 275 | July 10 | 2.6% |
| 276 | July 17 | 2.9% |
| 277 | July 31 | 3.2% |
| 278 | August 7 | 2.8% |
| 279 | August 14 | 3.4% |
| 280 | August 21 | 3.4% |
| 281 | August 28 | 2.9% |
| 282 | September 4 | 2.7% |
| 283 | September 11 | 2.7% |
| 284 | September 18 | 3.5% |
| 285 | September 25 | 2.9% |
| 286 | October 2 | 3.2% |
| 287 | October 16 | 3.3% |
| 288 | October 23 | 2.8% |
| 289 | November 6 | 3.7% |
| 290 | November 13 | 2.6% |
| 291 | November 20 | 2.9% |
| 292 | November 27 | 2.9% |
| 293 | December 4 | 3.2% |
| 294 | December 11 | 3.6% |
| 295 | December 25 | 3.1% |

=== 2026 ===
List of episodes in 2026 (episode 296–present)

| Ep. # | Original airdate | Nielsen ratings |
| Ep. # | Original airdate | Nationwide |
|---|---|---|
| 296 | January 1 | 4.1% |
| 297 | January 8 | 3.5% |
| 298 | January 15 | 3.1% |
| 299 | January 22 | 3.4% |
| 300 | January 29 | 3.5% |
| 301 | February 5 | 4.5% |
| 302 | February 12 | 4.8% |
| 303 | February 19 | 4.0% |
| 304 | February 26 | 4.0% |
| 305 | March 12 | 3.2% |
| 306 | March 19 | 2.5% |
| 307 | March 26 | 2.7% |
| 308 | April 2 | 2.1% |
| 309 | April 9 | 3.4% |
| 310 | April 16 | 3.3% |
| 311 | April 23 | 1.7% |
| 312 | April 30 | 3.3% |
| 313 | May 7 | 2.5% |
| 314 | May 14 | 3.0% |
| 315 | May 21 | 2.9% |
| 316 | May 28 | 2.8% |
| 317 | June 5 | 1.9% |
| 318 | June 26 | 2.0% |
| 319 | July 3 | 1.4% |
| 320 | July 10 | 2.0% |
| 321 | July 17 | 1.2% |
| 322 | July 24 | 2.2% |
| 323 | August 7 | 1.7% |
| 324 | August 14 | |

== Awards and nominations ==
| Year | Award | Category | Recipient | Result | Ref. |
|---|---|---|---|---|---|
| 2019 | 17th KBS Entertainment Awards | Best Challenge Award | Problem Child in House | Won | |
| 2019 | 17th KBS Entertainment Awards | Excellence Award in Entertainment | Min Kyung-hoon | Nominated | |
| 2020 | 18th KBS Entertainment Awards | Grand Prize (Daesang) | Kim Sook | Won | |
| 2020 | 18th KBS Entertainment Awards | Viewers' Choice Best Program Award | Problem Child in House | Nominated | |
| 2020 | 18th KBS Entertainment Awards | Top Excellence Award in Show/Variety Category | Song Eun-i | Nominated | |
| 2020 | 18th KBS Entertainment Awards | Producers' Special Award | Song Eun-i | Won | |
| 2020 | 18th KBS Entertainment Awards | Excellence Award in Show/Variety Category | Min Kyung-hoon | Nominated | |
| 2021 | 19th KBS Entertainment Awards | | | | |
| 2021 | 19th KBS Entertainment Awards | Grand Prize (Daesang) | Kim Sook | Nominated | |
| 2021 | 19th KBS Entertainment Awards | Entertainer of the Year | Kim Sook | Won | |
| 2022 | 20th KBS Entertainment Awards | | | | |
| 2022 | 20th KBS Entertainment Awards | Grand Prize (Daesang) | Kim Sook | Nominated | |
| 2022 | 20th KBS Entertainment Awards | Entertainer of the Year | Kim Sook | Won | |
| 2023 | 21st KBS Entertainment Awards | | | | |
| 2023 | 21st KBS Entertainment Awards | Grand Prize (Daesang) | Kim Sook | Nominated | |
| 2023 | 21st KBS Entertainment Awards | Entertainer of the Year | Kim Sook | Won | |
| 2025 | 23rd KBS Entertainment Awards | | | | |
| 2025 | 23rd KBS Entertainment Awards | Grand Prize (Daesang) | Kim Sook | Nominated | |
| 2025 | 23rd KBS Entertainment Awards | Entertainer of the Year | Kim Sook | Won | |
| 2025 | 23rd KBS Entertainment Awards | Top Excellence Award | Song Eun-i | Won | |
| 2025 | 23rd KBS Entertainment Awards | Top Excellence Award | Kim Jong-kook | Nominated | |
| 2025 | 23rd KBS Entertainment Awards | Excellence Award | Joo Woo-jae | Won | |
| 2025 | 23rd KBS Entertainment Awards | Excellence Award | Yang Se-chan | Nominated | |
| 2025 | 23rd KBS Entertainment Awards | Best Entertainer Award | Hong Jin-kyung | Won | |
