= Baeksang Arts Award for Best Male Variety Performer =

South Korean annual television award

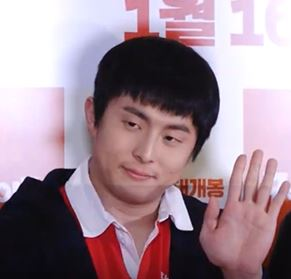
- 2026 recipient: Kian84
- Awarded for: Best male performance in South Korean variety programs
- Country: South Korea
- Presented by: Baeksang Arts Awards
- Most recent winner: Kian84 (2026)
- Website: baeksangartsawards

The Baeksang Arts Award for Best Male Variety Performer (Korean: 백상예술대상 TV부문 남자 예능상; RR: Baeksang Yesul Daesang TV Bumun Namja Yeneungsang) is annually presented at the Baeksang Arts Awards ceremony.

== List of winners ==
| # | Year | Recipient | Variety show / Sitcom |
|---|---|---|---|
| 34th | 1998 | Kim Hyung-gon | Show! Haenguneul Jabara (쇼! 행운을 잡아라) |
| 35th | 1999 | Nam Hee-suk | Good Friends (좋은 친구들) |
| 36th | 2000 | Shim Hyun-sub | Gag Concert |
| 37th | 2001 | Kim Yong-man | Sunday Night |
| 38th | 2002 | Kang Sung-beom | Gag Concert |
| 39th | 2003 | Kang Ho-dong | Soulmates (천생연분) |
| 40th | 2004 | Kim Je-dong | Happy Together |
| 41st | 2005 | Cultwo | People Looking for a Laugh (웃찾사) |
| 42nd | 2006 | Yoo Jae-suk | Good Sunday |
| 43rd | 2007 | Jeong Jong-cheol | Gag Concert |
| 44th | 2008 | Park Myung-soo | Happy Together |
| 45th | 2009 | Kim Byung-man | Gag Concert |
| 46th | 2010 | Park Seong-ho | Gag Concert |
| 47th | 2011 | Lee Soo-geun | 2 Days & 1 Night |
| 48th | 2012 | Kim Jun-hyun | Gag Concert |
| 49th | 2013 | Kim Byung-man | Law of the Jungle |
| 50th | 2014 | Shin Dong-yup | Witch Hunt |
| 51st | 2015 | Jun Hyun-moo | Non-Summit; I Live Alone |
| 52nd | 2016 | Kim Gu-ra | My Little Television |
| 53rd | 2017 | Yang Se-hyung | Mobidic: Yang Se-hyung's Shortview (모비딕 ‘양세형의 숏터뷰’) |
| 54th | 2018 | Seo Jang-hoon | Knowing Bros; Same Bed, Different Dreams 2 |
| 55th | 2019 | Jun Hyun-moo | I Live Alone |
| 56th | 2020 | Yoo Jae-suk | Hangout with Yoo |
| 57th | 2021 | Lee Seung-gi | Master in the House; Sing Again; Busted! |
| 58th | 2022 | Lee Yong-jin | Turkids on the Block |
| 59th | 2023 | Kim Jong-kook | GYM Jong Kook; Running Man; My Little Old Boy; Problem Child in House; I Can See Your Voice |
| 60th | 2024 | Na Yeong-seok | Things That Make Me Groove; The Game Caterers; Jinny's Kitchen |
| 61st | 2025 | Shin Dong-yup | SNL Korea |
| 62nd | 2026 | Kian84 | Adventure by Accident 4 |

== Sources ==
- "Baeksang Arts Awards Nominees and Winners Lists". Naver Movie (in Korean).
- "Baeksang Arts Awards Winners Lists". Baeksang Arts Awards (in Korean).
