= Moon Se-yoon =

South Korean comedian

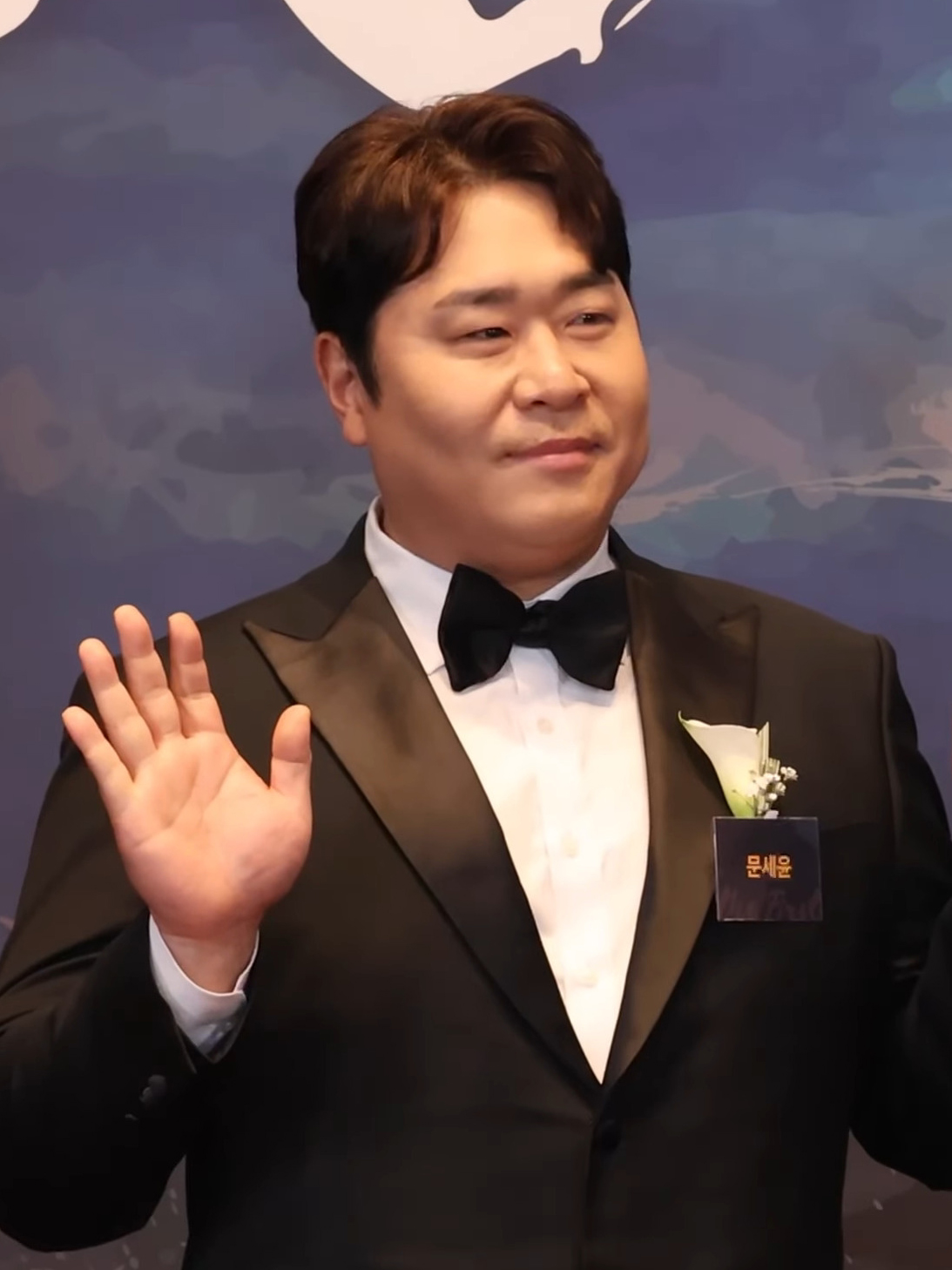
- Moon in 2026
- Born: May 11, 1982 (age 44); Jungnang-gu, Seoul, South Korea
- Spouse: Kim Ha-na (김하나) (m. 2009)
- Children: 2

Comedy career
- Years active: 2002–present
- Medium: Stand-up, television
- Genres: Observational, Sketch, Wit, Parody, Slapstick, Dramatic, Sitcom

Korean name
- Hangul: 문세윤
- Hanja: 文世潤
- RR: Mun Seyun
- MR: Mun Seyun

Moon Se-yoon (born May 11, 1982), is a South Korean comedian and television personality. He began his career in the entertainment industry as a comedian with SBS, starting with Good Friends in 2002. He gained recognition through his appearances on SBS's People Looking for a Laugh and cable channel tvN's Comedy Big League. Currently, he is a fixed cast member of Comedy Big League, 2 Days & 1 Night, Amazing Saturday and Delicious Guys, and managed by FNC Entertainment.

== Early life ==
Moon Se-yoon was born on May 11, 1982 in Jungnang-gu, Seoul, weighing 4.5 kg at birth. He was known in his neighborhood as a mischievous child. As a young boy, he would often wear a red toy car set and put on headphones, entertaining adults by singing songs such as Cho Yong-pil's "Empty Space." In high school, he was nicknamed "400 Won" because he often had only 400 Won in his pocket but still managed to entertain his friends and be the group's comedian. He also participated in a program called "Chasing the Stars." On this program, he received an award for his impersonations. Moon has mentioned that this experience was an early influence, contributing to his decision to pursue a career in the entertainment industry. He has stated that the positive reception he received for his performances during this time encouraged him to explore his comedic talents further.

== Career ==
Moon officially debuted as a comedian in 2002 through the SBS Comedian Contest. In 2003, he joined SBS's comedy show People Looking for a Laugh. Moon gained attention for his portrayal of a cross-dressing character in the 'Quiz, Let's Play' segment of the show. His catchphrase, "I don't know~ la~~yo~~," became associated with his character in that segment. He also participated in other segments of People Looking for a Laugh, including the 'Fine Words Drama' corner, 'Pigeon Karaoke', and the Pyo's brother.

In 2006, Moon Se-yoon appeared in the MBC sitcom Elephant, directed by Lee Min-ho. In the sitcom, Moon portrayed the character of Baek-soo Joo Bok-soo, the second son of Joo-hyun's character in the landlord's family. Elephant depicted the intertwined lives of the landlord's family and the tenant's family, exploring themes such as the school lives of teenagers, the romantic relationships of those in their 20s, the challenges of unemployment, and the family dynamics of middle-aged and elderly characters. Moon's performance earned him a nomination for the Excellence Award in the MBC Entertainment Awards.

In the same year, Moon took on the role of Song Young-bae, a ssireum wrestler, in the film Like a Virgin. The film's narrative centered on Dong-gu, an overweight high school student who enters the world of wrestling. Moon's character, Song Young-bae, also known as 'Dungchi Won,' is a senior member of Dong-gu's wrestling team (played by Ryu Deok-hwan). In the film, Song Young-bae agrees to teach Dong-gu wrestling techniques. Moon's performance earned him a nomination for Best New Actor at the 5th Korean Film Awards. He was grateful for the opportunity to work with talented individuals and be part of a film submitted to the Berlin International Film Festival. Positive feedback motivated him to aim for better projects in the future.

After completing his mandatory military service, Moon was discharged in April 2013. He signed with A-List Entertainment in the same month. Subsequently, he and Jung Ju-rib joined tvN's Comedy Big League.

After joining FNC Entertainment, Moon is active in entertainment show.

In 2026, Moon reunited with Kim Seon-ho in a special appearance for Netflix original series Can This Love Be Translated? A romantic comedy that follows the relationship between Joo Ho-jin (Kim Seon-ho), a multilingual interpreter, and Cha Mu-hee (Go Youn-jung), a top actress. Moon acted as a taxi driver who drives Joo Ho-jin from the airport.

== Personal life ==
Moon was familiar with Buddhism from a young age, influenced by his mother's Buddhist practices. Since July 2005, Moon has been serving as a DJ on the Buddhist Broadcasting System's program, Music Punch. In this role, he engages with listeners by reading their text messages and emails, which often contain personal stories and reflections on life. He has mentioned that this experience provides him with valuable insights and learning opportunities.

Moon married Kim Ha-na, a former LG Twins cheerleader team leader, on November 21, 2009, at the Ceritsu Wedding Convention in Nonhyeon-dong, Seoul. The couple had been dating for six years prior to their marriage. Moon has mentioned that he first connected with Kim through an online platform, where she initially reached out to him as a fan. Their relationship developed from an online friendship to a romantic partnership. They have two children: a daughter born on December 8, 2012, and a son born on October 14, 2014.

== Filmography ==
=== Films ===
Year	Title	Role	Notes/Ref.
2006	Mr. Wacky	School nurse	Special appearance
2006	Like a Virgin	Song Young-bae (Big guy 1)	
2007	Love Exposure	Radio DJ	Special appearance
2007	Hellcats	Ah-mi's hairstylist	
2008	Radio Dayz	Political party member 3	
2008	My Mighty Princess	Captain of a club	
2010	Foxy Festival	Deok-gu	
2011	Penny Pinchers	Sysop	
2013	Incomplete Life: Prequel	Kim Dong-sik	Main character
2014	The Wicked	University teaching assistant	
2016	Mood of the Day	Car repair shop junior	
2016	Half	Pink	
2016	Familyhood	Broadcasting station entertainer	Special appearance
2017	Fabricated City	Documentary narrator	Special appearance

=== Television series ===
Year	Title	Role	Notes	Ref.
2006	Elephant	Lord Revenge		
2008	Hong Gil-dong	Mr. Yeon		
2008	Seoul Warrior Story	Lee Man-gi		
2008	Fantasy Story	Yeongmin		
2013	MBC Drama Festival - Survival in Africa	Park Eun-seong		
2013	KBS Drama Special - The Strange Cohabitation	Room 504 resident	Minor character	
2014	Cheo Yong	Ghost hunter cameraman	Guest appearance (Episode 2)	
2015	Misaengmul	Chief Executive Officer	Supporting character	
2015	The Superman Age	Moon Se-yoon	Special appearance	
2015	High-End Crush	Jang Sae-yoon	Supporting character	
2016	One More Happy Ending	Cupid	Special appearance	
2016	Click Your Heart	Bus driver	Minor character	
2016	Cinderella with Four Knights	Convenience store manager	Special appearance (Episode 1–2)	
2019	Young Ae's Crunchy 17	Shaman Station	Special appearance (Episode 1)	
2020	Kkondae Intern	Mr.Park	Special appearance (Episode 23)	
2020	Start-Up	Security guard	Special appearance (Episode 7)	

=== Television shows ===
On-Air

Year	Title	Role	Notes	Ref.
2002	Good Friends	Cast Member		
2002	Gag Concert	Cast Member	Disgrace of a Family skit	
2003	People Looking for a Laugh	Cast Member		
2004	English Magic School (잉글리시 매직스쿨)	Cast Member		
2006	Comedy Countdown (코미디 카운트 다운)	Cast Member		
2008	Live Animals (동물이 산다)	Cast Member		
2013–present	Comedy Big League	Cast Member	Season 3–present	
2015–2023	Delicious Guys	Co-host	with Yoo Min-sang, Kim Jun-hyun and Kim Min-kyung	
2016	Real Men	Cast Member	Comedian special	
2016	Singing Battle – Victory	Contestant	Team Lee Sang-min, Pilot	
2016–2017	Mr. House Husband	Panelist	Season 1	
2017	One Night Food Trip: Eating Race	Contestant	Episode 1	
2017	King of Mask Singer	Contestant	Episodes 105–106	
2017	I Can See Your Voice	Tone-deaf Detective Team	Season 4, Episode 10	
2017	Battle Trip	Contestant	with Yoo Min-sang (Episode 68–69)	
2018–present	DoReMi Market	Cast Member		
2018–2019	Salty Tour	Cast Member	Episodes 25 – 78	
2019	The Ranksters	Cast Member	Episode 1–8	
2019	Tell Me	Cast Member	Episode 1–10	
2019– present	2 Days & 1 Night	Cast Member	Season 4	
2021	Honeymoon Tavern	Cast Member		
2021	Rice come at the end of hardship	Main Cast		
2021	Still Alive	Main Cast	Chuseok pilot	
2021	Godfather	Main Cast		
2022	Baby Singer	Host		
2022	Over the Top	Contestant		
2022	Dog-Daughter-in-law	Host		
2022	Mystery Club	Host	2 pilot episodes	
2023–present	Oh Eun-young Report - Marriage Hell	Host		
2023	Mukbo Brothers Season 1	Cast Member	with Kim Jun-hyun	
2023–2024	Strong Heart VS	Host	with Jeon Hyun-moo, Uhm Ji-yoon, and Jo Hyun-Ah	
2024	Mukbo Brothers Season 2	Cast Member	with Kim Jun-hyun	

=== Web show ===
Web shows
Year	Event/ Show	Notes	Ref.
2022	Captain Moon		
2022	Everyone is Good at Singing		

=== Hosting ===
Year	Event/ Show	Notes	Ref.
2021	2021 KBS Entertainment Awards	with Kim Sung-joo and Han Sun-hwa	
2022	2022 KBS Entertainment Awards	with Seol In-ah and Kang Chan-hee	

=== Radio shows ===
Year	Title	Role	Notes	Ref.
2005	Buddhist broadcast Music Punch	DJ		
2022	Cultwo Show	Special DJ	August 1	

== Stage ==
=== Musical ===
Year	Title		Role	Venue	Date	Ref.
Year	English	Original	Role	Venue	Date	Ref.
2015	Love in the Rain	사랑은 비를 타고	Jung Dong-wook	Uniplex Theater 2	June 6 to July 31, 2015	

=== Theater ===
Year	Title		Role	Venue	Date	Ref.
Year	English	Original	Role	Venue	Date	Ref.
2010	Romeo and Juliet Ver 2.0	로미오와 줄리엣 Ver2.0	Capulet	Bukchon Changwoo Theater (Shakespeare Theater in Daehakro)	March 13 to May 9, 2010	

== Discography ==
=== Singles ===
Title	Year	Note	Ref.
"My Loving Laughter" (멜로가 체질)	2020	All My Ballad	
"I'm Unfamiliar" (은근히 낯가려요) (feat. Ravi)	2021	Debut Project	
"Ssook Dong" (쑥맥) featuring Choi Yoo-jung (Weki Meki)	2022		

== Accolades ==
=== Awards and nominations ===
Year	Award	Category	Nominated work / Recipient	Result	Ref.
2006	5th Korean Film Awards	Best New Actor	Like a Virgin	Nominated	
2007	SBS Entertainment Awards	Comedian Popularity Award	Pong Pong Pong	Nominated	
2008	MBC Entertainment Awards	Excellence Award — Male Entertainer in Comedy/Sitcom	Elephant	Nominated	
2016	Cable TV Broadcasting Awards	Delicious Star Award	Delicious Guys	Won	
2019	55th Baeksang Arts Awards	Best Variety Performer – Male	Delicious Guys	Nominated	
2019	Korea Culture and Entertainment Awards	Best Prize — Entertainment	Delicious Guys	Won	
2020	Korea First Brand Awards	Best Comedian Award	Moon Se-yoon	Won	
2020	56th Baeksang Arts Awards	Best Variety Performer – Male	2 Days & 1 Night Season 4	Nominated	
2020	18th KBS Entertainment Awards	Top Excellence Award in Variety	2 Days & 1 Night Season 4	Won	
2021	57th Baeksang Arts Awards	Best Variety Performer – Male	2 Days & 1 Night Season 4 and Delicious Guys	Nominated	
2021	Brand of the Year Awards	Male Entertainer	Moon Se-yoon	Won	
2021	19th KBS Entertainment Awards	Grand Prize (Daesang)	2 Days & 1 Night Season 4 and Godfather	Won	
2021	19th KBS Entertainment Awards	Entertainer of the Year	2 Days & 1 Night Season 4	Won	
2022	Brand Consumer Loyalty Awards	Entertainer Category	Moon Se-yoon	Won	
2022	58th Baeksang Arts Awards	Best Male Variety Performer	Moon Se-yoon	Nominated	
2022	2022 Post Office Shopping Year Competition	Ministry of Science and Technology Award	Moon Se-yoon	Won	
2025	KBS Entertainment Awards	Best Entertainer Award in Show and Variety	2 Days & 1 Night Season 4	Won	

=== Listicle ===
Name of publisher, year listed, name of listicle, and placement
Publisher	Year	List	Placement	Ref.
Star News	2006	KBS, MBC, and SBS Entertainment Team Leader's Selection of 2006 Hopefuls	Shortlisted	
KBS	2023	The 50 people who made KBS shine	22nd	
