= 2020 KBS Entertainment Awards =

18th edition of award ceremony

- Awarded for: Excellence in variety entertainment
- Date: December 24, 2020
- Site: KBS New Wing Open Hall, Yeouido-dong, Yeongdeungpo-gu, Seoul
- Hosted by: Jun Hyun-moo; Jin Se-yeon; Kim Jun-hyun

Television coverage
- Network: KBS2, KBS World
- Duration: Approx. 180 minutes
- Viewership: Ratings: 5.5% (Part 1); 3.5% (Part 2); Viewership: 1.061 million

The 2020 KBS Entertainment Awards presented by Korean Broadcasting System (KBS), took place on December 24, 2020, at KBS New Wing Open Hall in Yeouido-dong, Yeongdeungpo-gu, Seoul. It was hosted by Jun Hyun-moo, Jin Se-yeon and Kim Jun-hyun.

== Nominations and winners ==
(Winners denoted in bold)

| Grand Prize (Daesang) | Viewers' Choice Best Program Award |
|---|---|
| **Kim Sook – Problem Child in House, Boss in the Mirror**; Jun Hyun-moo – Boss in the Mirror, Happy Together 4; Kim Jong-min – 2 Days & 1 Night 4, Idol on Quiz; Sam Hammington's family – The Return of Superman; Lee Kyung-kyu – Stars' Top Recipe at Fun-Staurant, Dogs Are Incredible | **2 Days & 1 Night 4**; Dogs Are Incredible; Immortal Songs: Singing the Legend; Boss in the Mirror; Mr. House Husband 2; The Return of Superman; Stars' Top Recipe at Fun-Staurant |
Top Excellence Award
| Show/Variety Category | Reality Category |
| **Moon Se-yoon** – **2 Day & 1 Night 4**; Jang Yoon-jung – I Like Songs, The Return of Superman; Hong Kyung-min – Trot National Festival, The Return of Superman, Immortal Songs: Singing the Legend; Song Eun-i – Problem Child in House; Park Na-rae – Stand Up; Kim Tae-woo – Immortal Songs: Singing the Legend | **Poppin' Hyun Joon and Park Ye-ri** **– Mr. House Husband 2, Immortal Songs: Singing the Legend**; **Hyun Joo-yup – Boss in the Mirror**; Kang Hyung-wook – Dogs Are Incredible; Do Kyung-wan – The Return of Superman, I Like Songs, Stars' Top Recipe at Fun-Staurant; Lee Young-ja – Stars' Top Recipe at Fun-Staurant; Lee Yeon-bok – Stars' Top Recipe at Fun-Staurant |
Excellence Award
| Show/Variety Category | Reality Category |
| **DinDin – 2 Days & 1 Night 4**; Kim Shin-young – Immortal Songs: Singing the Legend; Kim Jun-hyun – Immortal Songs: Singing the Legend; Min Kyung-hoon – Problem Child in House; Yang Se-chan - Fly Shoot Dori - New Beginning; Lee Sang-min - War of Villains | **Lee Yoo-ri** – **Stars' Top Recipe at Fun-Staurant**; Yang Chi-seung – Boss in the Mirror; Oh Yoon-ah – Stars' Top Recipe at Fun-Staurant; Jang Do-yeon – Dogs Are Incredible; Choi Yang-rak and Peng Hyun-sook – Mr House Husband 2 |
Best Entertainer Award
| Show/Variety Category | Reality Category |
| **Hong Kyung-min – Trot National Festival and The Return of Superman**; **Yeon Jung-hoon – 2 Days & 1 Night 4**; **Seunghee – Not Soccer or Baseball** | **Yang Chi-seung – Boss in the Mirror**; **Oh Yoon-ah – Stars' Top Recipe at Fun-Staurant**; **Ryu Soo-young – Stars' Top Recipe at Fun-Staurant** |
Rookie Award
| Show/Variety Category | Reality Category |
| **Kim Seon-ho – 2 Days & 1 Night 4**; Na Tae-joo – Trot National Festival, Immortal Songs: Singing the Legend; Song Ga-in– Trot National Festival; Soobin – Music Bank; Seunghee – Not Soccer or Baseball; Arin – Music Bank | **Kim Il-woo** – **Mr. House Husband 2**; **Kim Jae-won – Stars' Top Recipe at Fun-Staurant**; Ryu Soo-young – Stars' Top Recipe at Fun-Staurant; Lee Chun-soo – The Return of Superman; Hur Jae – Boss in the Mirror |
Radio DJ Award
| New DJ of the Year Award | DJ of the Year Award |
| **Kang Han-na – Kang Han-na's Volume Up** | **Jo Woo-jong – Jo Woo-jong's FM March** |
Other Awards
| Staff of the Year Award | Producers' Special Award |
| **Ha Dong-geum** (artistic director) **– Korea Again Na Hoon-a**, **KBS Song Festival**; **Jang Ji-won** (music director) **– Immortal Songs: Singing the Legend, Trot National Festival** | **Lee Young-ja – Stars' Top Recipe at Fun-Staurant**; **Song Eun-i – Problem Child in House** |
| Broadcasting Screenwriter Award | Special Programme Award |
| **Kim Ji-eun – Trot National Festival, I Like Songs, Immortal Songs: Singing the Legend, Korea Again Na Hoon-a** | **Korea Again Na Hoon-a** |
| 2020 Hot Issue Variety Program | Best Challenge Award |
| **Dogs Are Incredible** | **Zombie Detective** |
| Best Icon Award | Best Couple Award |
| **The Return of Superman** Kids | **Choi Yang-rak and Peng Hyun-sook – Mr. House Husband 2**; **Kim Ye-rin and Yoon Joo-Man – Mr. House Husband 2**; **Soobin and Arin – Music Bank** |
| Best Online Content Award | Best Teamwork Award |
| **Kim Gu-ra – Studio K: Gura Cheol** | **Entertainment Weekly Live** |

== Presenters ==
| Order | Presenter | Award | Ref. |
|---|---|---|---|
| 1 | Yoo Jae-suk and Jessi | Rookie Awards | |
| 2 | Jin Se-yeon | Best Icon Award | |
| 3 | Lee Jae-si and Lee Dong-gook | Radio DJ Awards | |
| 4 | Kim Jun-hyun | Broadcasting Screenwriter Award | |
| 5 | Jun Hyun-moo | Staff of the Year Award | |
| 6 | Yeon Jung-hoon and Kim Seon-ho | Best Teamwork Award | |
| 6 | Yeon Jung-hoon and Kim Seon-ho | Best Couple Award | |
| 7 | Ravi and Lee Jin-hyuk | Hot Issue Variety Award | |
| 8 | Jin Se-yeon | Special Programme Award | |
| 9 | Kim Jae-won | Best Challenge Award | |
| 10 | Lia Kim and Kang Hyung-wook | Best Digital Content Award | |
| 11 | Moon Se-yoon and DinDin | Best Entertainer Awards | |
| 12 | Kim Sook | Producers' Special Award | |
| 13 | Kim Jong-min and Jang Do-yeon | Excellence Awards | |
| 14 | Lee Hwi-jae and Sam Hammington | Top Excellence Awards | |
| 15 | Song Eun-i and Lee Hoon-hee | Viewers' Choice Best Program Award | |
| 16 | Yang Seung-dong | Daesang Award | |

== Special performances ==
| Order | Artist | Song/Spectacle | Ref. |
|---|---|---|---|
| 1 | The Return of Superman casts | Blessed Christmas (Original: Kim Hyun-cheol) | |
| 1 | The Return of Superman casts | We Wish You a Merry Christmas | |
| 1 | The Return of Superman casts | Dynamite (Original: BTS) | |
| 2 | Mr. House Husband Team | The Happy Life (Original: Lee Kwang-jo) | |
| 3 | Kim Tae-woo, Kim Jun-hyun and Kim Shin-young (Narr. Shin Dong-yup) | Stand By Me (Original: Ben E. King) | |
| 4 | Nam Jin, Jo Jung-min | White Christmas (Original: Bing Crosby) | |
| 4 | Nam Jin, Yoon Do-hyun | Nest (Original: Nam Jin) | |
| 5 | Kim Sook, Jun Hyun-moo, Tiger JK, Bizzy | Monster (Original: Tiger JK) | |
| 6 | Ravi | Tiger | |
| 6 | Ravi | Tiger is Coming (Original: Leenalchi) | |
| 6 | Kim Jong-min, Yeon Jung-hoon, Moon Se-yoon, DinDin, Kim Seon-ho, Ravi | Move (Original: Taemin) | |

== See also ==
- 2020 MBC Entertainment Awards
- 2020 SBS Entertainment Awards
