= Black Beat =

South Korean boy band

Black Beat 블랙 비트
- Origin: Seoul, South Korea
- Genre: K-pop
- Years active: 2002–2007
- Label: SM Entertainment
- Past members: Lee So-min; Hwang Sang-hoon; Jung Ji-hoon; Shim Jae-won; Jang Jin-young
- Website: Official Site

Black Beat (블랙 비트) was a South Korean boy band formed by SM Entertainment. The five-member group released an album Volume 1 - Black Beat #2002 in 2002. They have not promoted as a group since SM Town 2006. Several members are active as choreographers and vocal trainers for other SM Entertainment artists. In 2007, lead vocalist Jang Jin-young teamed up with Kim Sung-pil to form the R&B duo, ByJinSung.

Black Beat was originally planned to be formed as a seven-member group before they debuted in 2000. They debuted as a five-member group during Lee Ji-hun's Dream Concert 2000 as back-up vocalists and dancers. Before 2002, Black Beat members performed as rappers and dancers for other artists. They have all performed as dancers for S.E.S.' "Dreams Come True" performances.

== Performing with other artists ==
After joining SM Entertainment, Black Beat has appeared in many music videos and performances for other artists, mainly S.E.S. Other artists include BoA, H.O.T., Shinhwa, Fly to the Sky, Shinvi, Dana, and Lee Ji-hun as dancers, backup vocals, choreographers, and rappers. A video clip of member Jae-won dancing with Hyoyeon, a member of girl group Girls' Generation, has also garnered a lot of attention. .

== Former members ==
- Lee So-min (이소민)
- Hwang Sang-hoon (황상훈)
- Jung Ji-hoon (정지훈)
- Shim Jae-won (심재원)
- Jang Jin-young (장진영)

== Appearances in music videos ==
All five members (dancers)

- Shinhwa's "All Your Dreams"

Yoo Hyun-jae, Jung Ji Hun, Hwang Sang Hun, and Shim Jae-won (dancers)

- BoA's "ID Peace B"
- BoA's "Sara"

Yoo Hyun-jae (dancer) and Shim Jae-won (rapper)

- S.E.S.' "Twilight Zone"

Yoo Hyun-jae (dancer)

- S.E.S.' "I love you"

Shim Jae-won (as a thief; dancer)

- H.O.T.'s "We Are the Future"
- TVXQ's "Why (Keep Your Head Down)"
- TVXQ's "I Don't Know"
- TVXQ's "Superstar"
- BoA's "Only One"

Jang Jin-young (as the younger Jun Jin)

- Shinhwa's "Wedding March"
- Shinhwa's "All Your Dream" (Both Original & 2018 Remake Alongside M.I.L.K Bomi)

== Discography ==
- Volume 1 - Black Beat #2002 - The First Performance #001 (November 3, 2002)
1. Intro (Can't You Feel)
2. The Fan
3. 날개 (Wing)
4. Lover
5. In The Sky
6. Black Beat
7. Dangerous
8. 회상
9. Y (Tell Me Why)
10. 헤어지기전
11. Shine
12. Night Fever
13. 친구 (Friend)
14. In The Sky (Radio Edited) (Bonus Track

=== Joint discography ===
- Summer Vacation in SMTown.com June 10, 2002
- 2002 Winter Vacation in SMTown.com - My Angel My Light December 6, 2002
- 2003 Summer Vacation in SMTown.com June 18, 2003
- 2004 Summer Vacation in SMTown.com July 2, 2004
- 2006 Summer SMTown June 20, 2006
- 2006 Winter SMTown - Snow Dream December 12, 2006

== Awards ==
Year	Award-Giving Body	Category	Work	Result
2002	Mnet Asian Music Awards	Best New Group	"In The Sky"	Won
