= Sichuan Radio and Television =

Provincial broadcaster in Sichuan Province, China

Sichuan Radio and Television 四川广播电视台
- Type: Free-to-air, satellite television, radio
- Industry: Media and entertainment
- Founded: 1 May 1960
- Headquarters: Chengdu, Sichuan, China
- Area served: China and abroad
- Owner: Government of Sichuan
- Website: www.sctv.com

Sichuan Radio and Television (SRT) (Chinese: 四川广播电视台; pinyin: Sìchuān Guǎngbò Diànshìtái) is a major television network in China. The nationwide television network is owned by the Sichuan provincial government. SRT is based in Chengdu in Sichuan.

== History ==
SRT was launched 1 May 1960 as a local television network in Sichuan. SRT began broadcasting nationally on 1 August 2003.

== Television channels ==
- SCTV-1
- SCTV-2
- SCTV-3
- SCTV-4
- SCTV-5
- SCTV-6
- SCTV-7
- SCTV-8
- SCTV-9
- SCTV-10
- Kangba TV (SCTV-11)

== Production ==
SRT have broadcast notable programming such as 2 Days & 1 Night, often referred to as the Chinese version of Korea's reality talent show 2 Days & 1 Night.

- 2 Days & 1 Night
- China Positive Energy (中国正能量)
- China Big Love Concert (中国爱大歌会)
- Love is All (让爱做主)
