= Family Outing 2 =

- Also known as: Good Sunday - Family Outing 2
- Genre: Reality; Variety; Comedy
- Starring: Kim Won-hee; Yoon Sang-hyun; Ji Sang-ryeol; Shin Bong-sun; Yoona; Taecyeon; Jo Kwon; Kim Hee-chul; Jang Dong-min
- Country of origin: South Korea
- Original language: Korean
- No. of episodes: 17 (list of episodes)

Production
- Executive producer: Kwak Seung-young
- Producer: Nam Seung-yong
- Running time: 60-80 minutes

Original release
- Network: SBS
- Release: February 21 – July 11, 2010

Related
- Family Outing; Good Sunday

Family Outing Season 2 (Korean: 패밀리가 떴다2; RR: Paemilliga tteotda2; lit. Family's Here 2) is a South Korean variety show; a part of SBS's Good Sunday lineup, along with Gold Miss is Coming (골드미스가 간다). It first aired on February 21, 2010, following the end of the first season. In early episodes, a "Family Leader" (Note: The "Family Leader" (가장/家長) makes all decisions for the Family that outing and is chosen at the beginning of each pair of episodes. He/she will decide where the rest of the family members sleep, what they will eat for dinner/breakfast, etc.) is chosen and acts as the main host of that outing. That role has been abolished. The "Family" travels to rural parts of South Korea and helps out in the village they are staying in. The shows predecessor, Family Outing Season 1, featured a similar format, but ended because of the main host leaving and ratings dropping. This season differs from its predecessor with more focus on reality and the family aspect, and less on chores and games. This season ended on July 11, 2010 due to low ratings and was replaced with Running Man.

== Synopsis ==
This show is filmed over two days and one night, airing over two episodes. Episodes vary and do not always follow the same format.

The "Family Leader", who makes all decisions for the Family for that episode, is chosen through a vote. The family then heads to their destination. Candid interviews of the members air throughout the episode, discussing their feelings of something that just aired. The "Family Leader" also begins to make every decision deciding the Family's fate. The Family arrives at their house(s) and begins that day's agenda. A challenge is presented for the Family Leader as to whether they live in a nice house or the house that is falling apart. They settle into their new home and then take part in outdoor activities and games. There is no official main host, Kim Won-hee acts as a moderator during games. The Family then returns inside to prepare dinner. The Family Leader will need to go through a challenge and if he/she succeeds, he/she will have the better dinner available. If he/she fails, the family will eat the unfilling dinner. Late into the night, the Family prepares for bed. The next morning, the "Wake-Up Mission" takes place. Easier tasks are given to those who come out earliest and ascend to harder tasks for those who come out last. The Family is then waken up by loud techno music and flashing lights. The music continues playing as they participate in a morning exercise, followed by the "Wake-Up Mission". The mission involves finding food for breakfast and then preparing it afterwards. After breakfast, the Family completes a favor asked by the village headman. A preview of next week's episode is shown at the end of the each episode.

== Cast ==
The members of the second "Family" are Kim Won-hee, Yoon Sang-hyun, Shin Bong-sun, Ji Sang-ryeol, Yoona of Girls' Generation, Jo Kwon of 2AM, Taecyeon of 2PM and Kim Hee-chul of Super Junior. Jang Dong-min was added along with Kim Hee-chul during a recording on May 18, 2010. Kim Hee-chul is the eighth member of the Family, and Jang Dong-min is considered a fixed guest.

Name	Joined the show / Left the show	Character
Kim Won-hee	February, 2010	Shown as being "usually weak" (play on her name), Kim Won-hee acts as the "female master" and moderator of the show.
Yoon Sang-hyun	February, 2010	As this show is his first variety program, Yoon Sang-hyun is known as an "Entertainment Newbie" while still familiarising himself with being funny and is usually picked on. Dubbed as "Toto" by Sang-ryul due to his constant whining.
Ji Sang-ryeol	February, 2010	The oldest member of the family, Ji Sang-ryul usually sides with Kim Won-hee and Shin Bong-sun.
Shin Bong-sun	February, 2010	Also acting as a "female master" of the show, only second to Kim Won-hee, she enjoys controlling Ji Sang-ryul and Yoon Sang-hyun.
Yoona	February, 2010	The youngest member of the family, Yoona seems to have superior strength and beauty.
Taecyeon	February, 2010	Normally seen as a "beastly idol", Taecyeon is just as "beastly" in the Family.
Jo Kwon	February, 2010	Known to be flamboyant and emotional, Jo Kwon claims to be an entertainer veteran.
Kim Hee-chul	May, 2010	The newest and eighth member added to the Family. Hee-chul likes to act as the MC of the show.
Jang Dong-min	May, 2010	A fixed-guest of the show. Jang Dong-min uses furious gags towards other members of the Family.

== Relations ==
Relation (Note: These are all as-seen on-air and are considered official relations.)	Members	Details	First Seen
Idol Line (아이돌라인)	Yoona, Taecyeon, Jo Kwon, Heechul	As the idols of the show, they form a close bond with each other.	Episode 1 - Picking Up the Family/Episode 12 - Addition of Heechul
Love Line (러브라인)	Yoona, Taecyeon	After a joint stage performance, they are often paired up for games, which the other members tease them about it.	Episode 1 - Picking Up the Family/Episode 9/Episode 13
Bong-Ji Siblings (봉지남메)	Shin Bong-sun, Ji Sang-ryul	As the two gag man/woman of the show, the two are not close with each other, but form a funny, awkward relationship.	Episode 1 - Picking Up the Family
Rival Line - Tom & Jerry (천적라인-톰앤제리)	Yoon Sang-hyun, Jo Kwon	Jo Kwon claims to be the entertainer senior of Yoon Sang-hyun and makes fun of him for not being funny.	Episode 1 - Orientation

== Ratings ==
Although Season 2 features many popular celebrity and idol group members, ratings of the show continues to drop. Compared to the Season 1, Season 2 is currently viewed as a failure. Rumors has been circulating about the show's cancellation since the 3rd episode, which the show's producers strongly denied. The shows fate was eventually determined and it ended after 5 months due to low ratings.

In the ratings below, the highest rating for the show will in be red, and the lowest rating for the show will be in blue.

Episode 1-9 (Good Sunday Part 1)

Episode #	Original Airdate	Good Sunday Part 1 ratings (Family Outing Season 2)	
Episode #	Original Airdate	TNmS Ratings	AGB Ratings
1	February 21, 2010	17.8%	16.5%
2	February 28, 2010	12.4%	10.9%
3	March 7, 2010	11.8%	10.1%
4	March 14, 2010	9.1%	8.6%
5	March 21, 2010	6.1%	7.6%
6	March 28, 2010	6.2%	7.5%
7	April 11, 2010	5.6%	5.6%
8	May 2, 2010	7.2%	7.3%
9	May 9, 2010	6.8%	6.5%

Episode 10-16 (Good Sunday)

Episode #	Original Airdate	Good Sunday ratings (Family Outing 2 & Gold Miss is Coming)	
Episode #	Original Airdate	TNmS Ratings	AGB Ratings
10	May 16, 2010	10.6%	10.3%
11	May 23, 2010	12.2%	12.5%
12	May 30, 2010	6.8%	6.3%
13	June 6, 2010	8.2%	8.9%
14	June 13, 2010	6.3%	5.7%
15	June 27, 2010	10.4%	8.3%
16	July 4, 2010	10.7%	8.7%

Episode 17 (Good Sunday Part 2)

Episode #	Original Airdate	Good Sunday Part 2 ratings (Family Outing Season 2)	
Episode #	Original Airdate	TNmS Ratings	AGB Ratings
17	July 11, 2010	8.1%	6.7%

== Critical reception ==
Season 2 received mostly negative reviews from TV critics and viewers who criticized the changes made on the format of the show, the casting choice and the fact that the show became too idol-oriented with most of the airtime and attention being given to the idol group members of the cast. Viewers also complained about Season 2 being too boring and for focusing too much on the forced love-lines between SNSD's member Yoona and 2PM's member Taecyeon. Viewers complained that the love-lines are heavily scripted and doesn't suit the 'family' concept of the show. There was much comparison between Season 1 and 2, with viewers commenting that the first season was much more humorous and natural.

== See also ==
- SBS Family Outing
- SBS Good Sunday
- KBS 1 Night 2 Days
- MBC Infinite Challenge
