= Family Outing =

2008–2010 South Korean variety show

- Logo
- Genre: Reality, Variety, Comedy
- Starring: Yoo Jae-suk (2008–2010); Lee Hyo-ri (2008–2010); Kim Soo-ro (2008–2010); Yoon Jong-shin (2008–2010); Dae-sung (2008–2010); Kim Jong-kook (2008–2010); Park Ye-jin (2008–2009); Lee Chun-hee (2008–2009); Park Hae-jin (2009–2010); Park Si-yeon (2009)
- Country of origin: South Korea
- Original language: Korean
- No. of episodes: 84 (list of episodes)

Production
- Executive producer: Jang Hyuk-jae
- Camera setup: Multi-camera setup
- Running time: 70–80 minutes

Original release
- Network: SBS
- Release: June 15, 2008 – February 14, 2010

Related
- Family Outing 2 Good Sunday

Family Outing (Korean: 패밀리가 떴다; RR: Paemilliga tteotda; lit. Family's Here; also known as Family Outing Season 1) was a South Korean comedy-variety show; part of SBS's Good Sunday lineup, along with Gold Miss is Coming (골드미스가 간다). It first aired on June 15, 2008, and was one of the top rated programs on Sunday Korean television. Each week, the cast members referred to as "Family" travelled to different locations in South Korea to stay for a single night. During their stay the Family would play games and complete tasks set by the owners of the home, while the owners are out on vacation.

The game-variety show format of Family Outing has widely been considered to be influenced by its predecessor, X-Man with both programs sharing key production and cast members, the most notable of which being Main Producer Jang Hyuk-jae, MC Yoo Jae-suk and cast member Kim Jong-kook. Trademarks of the production included sound effects, pop-up text and background music in accordance with the on-screen narrative. Music included personal theme songs for various cast members, frequently coordinated with moments of lament or foolishness for comedic effect, or schadenfreude.

The first season ended on February 14, 2010, and a second season of 17 episodes featuring a brand new cast and production team aired from February 21, 2010 to July 11, 2010.

== Episode synopsis ==
The show typically followed a format comprising a series of two-episode arcs. These comprised a two-day shoot, including an overnight stay for the cast and crew, that was edited for broadcast over two weekly episodes. Generally, the events transpiring on the first day of filming would be shown in the first of the two-episode arc, with the second day's events broadcast in the second episode. These two days of filming were generally filmed biweekly, with the cast and crew regathering every two weeks. Guest cast members frequently joined the permanent members for the two-episode arc, appearing in two successive episodes before departing.

The first of two episodes typically starts with a phone call from Yoo Jae-suk, the MC of the show, notifying the Family members where and when to gather for the next location of filming, which was frequently a remote, rural region. Each member arrives along with any guests, as they greet each other and the viewing audience. The guest is usually then given a map to lead the Family to the house in which they will be staying for their two-day stay. Upon reaching the house, the Family greet and send the homeowners off on a vacation. At this point, the Family reviews the list of chores that the homeowners have assigned before setting upon the first task. While completing the list of chores, the Family compete in various mental and physical challenges. After completing the first chore, the Family may proceed to the next assigned or return home to prepare dinner. For the latter, the Family usually divides into teams to gather ingredients, clean, prepare, and cook.

After eating dinner, the Family typically play another game before preparing for bedtime. This game often determines sleep positions or who is in charge of late-night/early-morning chores. Sleeping arrangement allowed the Family to determine where each member would be positioned overnight, with this ranking of particular importance if sleeping locations included particularly undesirable quarters, such as a cold and cramped room, or next to someone inclined to flatulence. The ranking process involved the female cast members numerically ranking the men in the Family, often based on their performance either in the preceding game or over the course of the day. The male members then repeat the ranking process for the female Family members. In addition to bedding location, the ranking system or game was used to determine which Family members would be assigned the undesirable task of late-night/early-morning chores. These chores were typically menial tasks such as delivery, collection, or preparation of food.

The second of two episodes typically begins with the continuation of the previous night's activities. Frequently this involved some late-night conversation before the Family dozed off. The next morning, Yoo Jae-suk is typically the first to be woken and is then himself assigned the task of waking the other Family members. The reluctant waking process is usually presented for comedic effect. After the Family rise, Jae-suk initiates a "Wake Up Mission", where the losing member would be tasked with breakfast preparation, alongside other members (s)he selects. While they make breakfast, the rest of the Family either returns to bed, or completes another chore. The Family members that are assigned breakfast duty are frequently filmed gathering ingredients from around the community before commencing preparation and cooking. In this way the program also highlights regional produce and places of interest in more rural villages. After the Family awakens a second time to eat breakfast, they typically perform the last chores assigned by the homeowners. While completing these final tasks, the Family will often participate in another competition before returning to the house. The homeowners are then shown returning from vacation and bidding the Family farewell. The episode concludes with a sneak peek of the following episode, including the next guest(s).

== Cast and characters ==
The first "Family" was composed of comedian/MC Yoo Jae-suk, singer/songwriter/MC Yoon Jong-shin, Big Bang member Daesung, singer Lee Hyo-ri, actor Kim Soo-ro, singer Kim Jong-kook, actor Park Hae-jin, actress Park Si-yeon, actress Park Ye-jin and actor Lee Chun-hee. "Family" members Park Ye-jin and Lee Chun-hee left the show after 53 episodes and the expiration of their one-year contract with both citing their desire to focus on their acting careers. Near the end of the series, Park Si-yeon could not continue filming the show because of a physical injury.

On November 26, 2009, it was announced that Yoo Jae-suk and Park Si-yeon would be leaving the show. It was later reported that Family Outing Season 1 would end due to the conflicting schedules and solo activities of the members. Their last episode aired in February 2010 with the show returning for a second season, with a new concept, production team, and cast. All the original Family members reunited for the last three episodes, which included a special reunion awards episode.

- Yoo Jae-suk, June 2008 / February 2010
- Lee Hyo-ri, June 2008 / February 2010
- Yoon Jong-shin, June 2008 / February 2010
- Kim Soo-ro, June 2008 / February 2010
- Kang Dae-sung, June 2008 / February 2010
- Kim Jong-kook, November 2008 / February 2010
- Park Hae-jin, July 2009 / February 2010
- Lee Chun-hee, June 2008 / June 2009
- Park Ye-jin, June 2008 / June 2009
- Park Si-yeon, July 2009 / December 2009

== Guest stars ==
Guest star(s) were featured in most episodes, with the majority being in two back-to-back episodes.

Guests who were featured in more than two episodes are Jang Hyuk who appeared in episodes 27, 28 and 29 during the Christmas Special and Seo In-young (Jewelry) and Park Jin-young, whom both appeared in episodes 76, 77 and 78.

Family Outing had featured a variety of South Korea's most popular figures including actors (Cha Tae-hyun, Cha Seung-won, Ha Ji-won), athletes (Chu Sung-hoon), comedians (Ji Sang-ryeol) and kpop idols (Yoona, Taeyeon)

== Ratings ==
In the ratings below, the highest rating for the show will in be red, and the lowest rating for the show will be in blue.

=== 2008 ===
List of ratings

Episode #	Original Airdate		
Episode #	Original Airdate	TNmS Ratings	AGB Ratings
1	June 15, 2008	5.5% (Note: This rating is the rating of Good Sunday and therefore includes all corner programs.)	5.3%
2	June 22, 2008	9.0%	8.2%
3	June 29, 2008	8.5%	7.3%
4	July 6, 2008	6.3%	5.7%
5	July 13, 2008	8.0%	8.5%
6	July 20, 2008	10.6%	10.0%
7	July 27, 2008	13.4%	13.7%
8	August 3, 2008	12.9%	14.9%
9	August 17, 2008	21.7%	21.6%
10	August 24, 2008	18.3%	18.0%
11	August 31, 2008	19.9%	20.0%
12	September 7, 2008	16.4%	15.3%
13	September 14, 2008	16.3%	13.9%
14	September 21, 2008	22.1%	21.0%
15	September 28, 2008	20.3%	19.5%
16	October 5, 2008	21.3%	20.8%
17	October 12, 2008	23.0%	21.5%
18	October 19, 2008	23.6%	22.0%
19	October 26, 2008	27.5%	24.1%
20	November 2, 2008	24.5%	23.1%
21	November 9, 2008	29.6%	23.3%
22	November 16, 2008	26.4%	24.2%
23	November 23, 2008	25.1%	23.6%
24	November 30, 2008	26.1%	23.0%
25	December 7, 2008	28.0%	25.5%
26	December 14, 2008	25.1%	22.5%
27	December 21, 2008	29.1%	24.4%
28	December 28, 2008	27.7%	24.7%

=== 2009 ===
List of ratings

Episode #	Original Airdate		
Episode #	Original Airdate	TNmS Ratings	AGB Ratings
29	January 4, 2009	27.4%	23.7%
30	January 11, 2009	27.7%	25.6%
31	January 18, 2009	24.1%	23.1%
32	January 25, 2009	17.8%	18.0%
33	February 1, 2009	23.3%	21.5%
34	February 8, 2009	26.0%	21.7%
35	February 15, 2009	23.5%	23.1%
36	February 22, 2009	27.2%	24.9%
37	March 1, 2009	22.6%	21.3%
38	March 8, 2009	24.7%	22.1%
39	March 15, 2009	23.9%	22.9%
40	March 22, 2009	25.1%	21.0%
41	March 29, 2009	23.0%	19.9%
42	April 5, 2009	26.3%	21.8%
43	April 12, 2009	23.0%	18.6%
44	April 19, 2009	23.0%	19.4%
45	April 26, 2009	24.3%	20.1%
46	May 3, 2009	22.4%	18.5%
47	May 10, 2009	24.4%	20.4%
48	May 17, 2009	25.9%	23.9%
49	May 31, 2009	23.4%	18.8%
50	June 7, 2009	25.1%	21.1%
51	June 14, 2009	24.3%	19.6%
52	June 21, 2009	23.2%	18.9%
53	June 28, 2009	24.4%	18.5%
54	July 5, 2009	24.7%	19.7%
55	July 12, 2009	26.6%	21.0%
56	July 19, 2009	20.4%	17.5%
57	July 26, 2009	23.7%	18.8%
58	August 2, 2009	18.2%	14.9%
59	August 9, 2009	21.5%	16.7%
60	August 16, 2009	22.7%	17.2%
61	August 30, 2009	21.2%	17.6%
62	September 6, 2009	22.7%	18.6%
63	September 13, 2009	20.4%	17.0%
64	September 20, 2009	20.3%	18.3%
65	September 27, 2009	22.7%	18.6%
66	October 4, 2009	19.3%	15.9%
67	October 11, 2009	18.6%	16.1%
68	October 18, 2009	21.8%	17.2%
69	October 25, 2009	19.7%	18.0%
70	November 1, 2009	20.1%	17.5%
71	November 8, 2009	21.8%	18.8%
72	November 15, 2009	23.1%	18.7%
73	November 22, 2009	22.0%	17.8%
74	November 29, 2009	22.4%	19.3%
75	December 6, 2009	18.5%	15.4%
76	December 13, 2009	18.5%	15.3%
77	December 20, 2009	19.3%	16.6%
78	December 27, 2009	16.8%	13.8%

=== 2010 ===
List of ratings

Episode #	Original Airdate		
Episode #	Original Airdate	TNmS Ratings	AGB Ratings
79	January 3, 2010	16.5%	14.1%
80	January 10, 2010	16.5%	13.6%
81	January 17, 2010	17.9%	15.3%
82	January 24, 2010	18.0%	15.4%
83	January 31, 2010	18.6%	14.7%
84	February 7, 2010	16.1%	14.1%
85	February 14, 2010	8.7%	8.4%

== Awards and nominations ==
Year	Award	Category	Recipient	Result
2008	SBS Entertainment Awards	Daesang (Grand Prize)	Yoo Jae-suk	Won
2008	SBS Entertainment Awards	Excellence Award, Program	Family Outing	Won
2008	SBS Entertainment Awards	Popularity Award	Lee Chun-hee	Won
2008	SBS Entertainment Awards	Popularity Award	Park Ye-jin	Won
2008	SBS Entertainment Awards	PD Award	Kim Soo-ro	Won
2008	SBS Entertainment Awards	Best Writer	Lee Mi-sun	Won
2009	SBS Entertainment Awards	Daesang (Grand Prize)	Yoo Jae-suk	Won
2009	SBS Entertainment Awards	Daesang (Grand Prize)	Lee Hyori	Won
2009	SBS Entertainment Awards	Popularity Award	Lee Hyo-ri	Won
2009	SBS Entertainment Awards	Best Teamwork	Family Outing	Won

== See also ==
- SBS Family Outing 2
- SBS Good Sunday
- KBS 1 Night 2 Days
- MBC Infinite Challenge
