= Sanggeun =

South Korean dog (2004–2014)

Sanggeun (Korean: 상근이; born as Herbie, Korean: 허비; April 16, 2004 - April 11, 2014) was a South Korean Pyrenean Mountain Dog actor. When Sanggeun first made his appearance on TV show 2 Days & 1 Night, he was named "Sanggeun" by Ji Sang-ryul. Ji Sang-ryul adopted Sangdon, Sanggeun's son. Sanggeun died on April 11, 2014. Hoya, Sanggeun's son appeared in Season 3 Ep 23 of 2 Days & 1 Night a month after Sanggeun's death.

== Filmography ==
| Year | Title | Character |
|---|---|---|
| 2007–2011 | 2 Days & 1 Night | Himself |
| 2007–2008 | Madame Ahyundong | Seol-kook |
| 2010 | Heart Is... 2 | |

== Advertising ==
- LG Electronics phone
- LG Cyon Ice-cream phone
- KT Tech EVER Ever MGMG
- Aekyung S.T. Homes Air Fresh
- Outback Steakhouse
- English Moumou
- Lotte Confectionery Worldcorn
- BHC Chicken
- Hyundai Tucson

== See also ==
- List of individual dogs
