= 2 Days & 1 Night (Chinese TV series) =

- Intertitle
- 2天1夜; Liǎngtiān Yīyè
- Genre: Reality show
- Based on: 2 Days & 1 Night
- Country of origin: China
- Original language: Standard Chinese
- No. of seasons: 3
- No. of episodes: 7

Production
- Camera setup: Multicamera setup
- Running time: 70 minutes

Original release
- Network: SRT: Sichuan Television (1, Family Go); SMG: Dragon Television (2)
- Release: 27 October – 29 December 2013

2 Days & 1 Night (Chinese: 2天1夜) is a Chinese variety show. It is based on the South Korean reality show 2 Days & 1 Night and broadcast on Sichuan Television.

== Synopsis ==
The cast members have made various trips throughout Sichuan's major landmarks and complete for transportation, food, services, sleeping location, etc.

== Broadcast ==
- The first season of 2 Days & 1 Night debuted on 27 October 2013 on 8:30 PM through 10:00 PM every Sunday night on SRT: Sichuan TV.
- The second season of 2 Days & 1 Night debuted on 14 September 2014 on 9:15 PM through 10:30 PM every Saturday night on SMG: Dragon TV.
- Last updated of second season end on 30 November 2014.

== Cast and character ==
=== First season ===
- Jacky Wu Tsung-hsien is a famous host of variety show Guess he is also a singer and actor from Taiwan.
- Ma Ke is a former HBS news anchor for Hunan eTV.
- Kangta is a famous South Korean singer from 1st generation Kpop group H.O.T.
- Jiang Chao a Chinese actor known for his military roles, to costume drama roles, and sitcom roles.
- Zhu Zixiao a Chinese idol actor and variety host.
- Zhang Rui a Chinese idol actor and variety host.

=== Second season's MC ===
- 卜學亮 / Bu Xue Liang: Host and actor.
- 周韦彤 / Cica Zhou: Actress and model.
- 杜海涛 / Du Haitao: Host and actor.
- Lee Mayfair:
- Masson Bái Jǔ Gāng:
- Ahn Jae-hyun: South Korean actor and model.

== Episodes and visited locations ==
=== First season ===
Trip	EP	Aired date	Landmark	Cast & guest appearance
1st Leg	1	27 October 2013	Mount Qingcheng; Dujiangyan, Chengdu, Sichuan	Jacky Wu Tsung-hsien; Ma Ke; Kangta; Zhu Zixiao; Zhang Rui; Jaycee Chan Jo-ming (Guest)
1st Leg	2	3 November 2013	Dujiangyan irrigation system Dujiangyan, Chengdu, Sichuan	Jacky Wu Tsung-hsien; Ma Ke; Kangta; Zhu Zixiao; Zhang Rui; Jaycee Chan Jo-ming (Guest)
2nd Leg	3	10 November 2013	Huangze Temple; Lizhou, Guangyuan, Sichuan; Jianmen Pass & Cuiyun Corridor; Jiange County, Guangyuan, Sichuan; Mingyue Gorge; Chaotian, Guangyuan, Sichuan	Jacky Wu Tsung-hsien; Ma Ke; Kangta; Jiang Chao; Zhu Zixiao; Zhang Rui; Deric Wan Siu-lun (Guest)
2nd Leg	4	17 November 2013	Huangze Temple; Lizhou, Guangyuan, Sichuan; Jianmen Pass & Cuiyun Corridor; Jiange County, Guangyuan, Sichuan; Mingyue Gorge; Chaotian, Guangyuan, Sichuan	Jacky Wu Tsung-hsien; Ma Ke; Kangta; Jiang Chao; Zhu Zixiao; Zhang Rui; Deric Wan Siu-lun (Guest)
3rd Leg	5	24 November 2013	Shunan Bamboo Sea; Changning County, Yibin, Sichuan; Lizhuang Ancient Town; Cuiping, Yibin, Sichuan	Jacky Wu Tsung-hsien; Ma Ke; Kangta; Jiang Chao; Zhu Zixiao; Zhang Rui; Ray Lui Leung-wai (Guest)
3rd Leg	6	1 December 2013	Shunan Bamboo Sea; Changning County, Yibin, Sichuan; Lizhuang Ancient Town; Cuiping, Yibin, Sichuan	Jacky Wu Tsung-hsien; Ma Ke; Kangta; Jiang Chao; Zhu Zixiao; Zhang Rui; Ray Lui Leung-wai (Guest)
4th Leg	7	8 December 2013	Langzhong Ancient City; Langzhong, Nanchong, Sichuan	Jacky Wu Tsung-hsien; Ma Ke; Kangta; Jiang Chao; Zhu Zixiao; Zhang Rui; Zhang Rui; An Hu (Guest)
4th Leg	8	15 December 2013	Langzhong Ancient City; Langzhong, Nanchong, Sichuan	Jacky Wu Tsung-hsien; Ma Ke; Kangta; Jiang Chao; Zhu Zixiao; Zhang Rui; Zhang Rui; An Hu (Guest)
5th Leg	9	22 December 2013	Hailuogou Valley; Luding County, Garzê Prefecture, Sichuan	Jacky Wu Tsung-hsien; Ma Ke; Kangta; Jiang Chao; Zhu Zixiao; Zhang Rui; Zhang Rui; An Hu (Guest)
5th Leg	10	29 December 2013	Hailuogou Valley; Luding County, Garzê Prefecture, Sichuan	Jacky Wu Tsung-hsien; Ma Ke; Kangta; Jiang Chao; Zhu Zixiao; Zhang Rui; Zhang Rui; An Hu (Guest)

== Ratings ==
Episode	Date	Time	Rating	Percent	National ranking
1	27 October 2013	8:30-10:00 PM	0.580	1.53%	7
2	3 November 2013	8:30-10:00 PM	0.645	1.68%	3
3	10 November 2013	8:30-10:00 PM	0.592	1.55%	6
4	17 November 2013	8:30-10:00 PM	0.514	1.37%	6
5	24 November 2013	8:30-10:00 PM	0.390	1.01%	13
6	1 December 2013	8:30-10:00 PM	0.533	1.41%	6
7	8 December 2013	8:30-10:00 PM	0.910	2.35%	3
8	15 December 2013	8:30-10:00 PM	0.804	2.10%	3

The data determined by CSM.

== See also ==
- 2 Days & 1 Night (Korean version)
