= List of Family Outing episodes =

The following is a list of episodes of Family Outing (패밀리가 떴다). Family Outing was a South Korean television variety show that comprised SBS's Good Sunday lineup, along with Gold Miss is Coming (골드미스가 간다). It first aired on June 15, 2008 with the first season ending on February 14, 2010. The second season began on February 21, 2010 before ending on July 11, 2010. The show is filmed over two days and one night, then edited to comprise two broadcast episodes.

The first "Family" was composed of comedian/MC Yoo Jae-suk, singer/songwriter/MC Yoon Jong-shin, singer Kang Dae-sung, singer Lee Hyori, actor Kim Soo-ro, singer Kim Jong-kook, actor Park Hae-jin, actress Park Si-yeon, actress Park Ye-jin and actor Lee Chun-hee. The "Family," along with a special guest(s), travel to different parts of South Korea and takes care of the house of an elderly family while that family goes on a vacation. The "Family" then accomplishes the tasks left for them by the owners of the house. Along with the assigned tasks, they play games and prepare dinner and breakfast for themselves. The second "Family" was composed of Yoon Sang-hyun, Kim Won-hee, Ji Sang-ryeol, Shin Bong-sun, Yoona, Ok Taecyeon, Jo Kwon, Kim Heechul, and Jang Dong-min.

A total of 102 episodes have aired.

== Episodes ==
=== Season 1 ===
No.	Episode No.	Guest(s)	Location	Original airdates
1	1–2	Lee Chun-hee, (Note: Lee Chun-hee was originally a guest, but after good appraisal, he was chosen to be part of the permanent cast.) Kim Dong-wan (Shinhwa)	Maamter Village, Gangwon	June 15, 2008, June 22, 2008
1	The premiere episode of Family Outing begins with a "red carpet" event inside the SBS building; a night introducing the show and the Family members. The members interrogate each other with personal questions to allow the audience to familiarize itself with the Family. The day of formal filming follows with the Family gathering at a farm village, where everyone sets off for a local river to fish and play their first game. During the water-based running race, Hyori's team loses decisively to Yejin's, leading to the introduction of the "Hyori Effect". Returning home with their fish, Yejin reveals her "savage" fish preparation abilities while the other members look on with wonder. After dinner, the Family form a circle to play the "Saranghae (I Love You) Game" and end the evening with a ranking of Family members to determine the sleeping order. Highlights of the ranking include Yejin's annoyance at the men's slow voting leading to a reversal of results in Hyori's favor. As bedtime preparations continue, the faux "Big Bbeon" members Jongshin as "Kae Sung" and Jaesuk as "C-Dragon" are introduced. The next morning, the wake-up mission involves a trivia game, ultimately with Daesung and Jaesuk being held responsible for breakfast duty. Here the concept of "Dumb and Dumber" is introduced as the pairing encounters difficulty determining the appropriate amount of water for cooking ramyun. After breakfast, the Family set out to feed the farm's piglets, with some escaping and chasing down of the "kids" to ensue. The Family then move on to the fields to organize stacks of hay, but not before distracting themselves with another race game. Highlights include Sooro the "Game Devil" carrying Hyori's team to victory, Jongshin's "old man" accordion music, and Yejin losing her sense of direction following the "elephant spin". Finally, the Family stack the hay, plant the seeds, clean up the house, and welcome back the homeowners.			
2	3–4	Brian (Fly to the Sky)	Geumcheon Valley, Namhae Island, South Gyeongsang	June 29, 2008, July 6, 2008
2	The episode opens with the Family gathering at the airport, traveling by bus to the local seaside village. Highlights include the Family men conversing about female celebrities they would like to see on the show and Hyori mistaking a stewardess for an eager fan. The Family proceed to the beach to complete their first assigned task of digging for ssok (crayfish). Highlights include Chunhee and Brian revealing their less glamorous pre-celebrity birth names and Sooro unsuccessfully attempting to induce Chunhee to declare his respect for Sooro's acting career. After catching ssok, the Family form teams to play a game of 7-step long jumps. Highlights of the game include piggybacked jumps from the Hyori-Jaesuk and Yejin-Jongshin tandems. After the jumping game, the Family play a quick game of "Catch the Tail" at the muddy shores before heading to the roof of a local building to entertain the local residents with jokes, songs, and celebrity imitations over the town loudspeakers. During dinner preparations, the audience is introduced to the "Stepmother Kim and Chundrella" characters, as well as Chunhee's trademark children's Cinderella song. After eating, the Family form a circle for the Saranghae game, featuring highlights of 1) Brian's attacks of cuteness on Yejin and Jongshin and 2) Sooro threatening Chunhee to not dare laugh. The evening ends with sleep order rankings and bedtime preparations, highlighted by the Family turning off the lights and pretending to be asleep while Jongshin is still outside washing up. The wake-up mission comprises vocabulary trivia questions. Highlights include the Family teasing Yejin's attempts to hide facial bloating with sunglasses and Jaesuk jokingly referring to Daesung as Kim Jong-kook. The episode features abbreviated breakfast cooking and eating sequences, leading into a morning dance exercise session. The Family then execute their assigned task of trimming garlic plants, featuring a memorable scene of Chunhee accidentally dropping a straw basket on Sooro's head. The final assignment calls for the Family to harvest seagrass, which is followed by a race game on elevated planks in shallow waters. In a surprising turn of events, the Family "worst-team" of Jaesuk, Jongshin, and Chunhee win the final race of the day. The episode ends with the Family recording a message declaring their thanks for the returning homeowners.			
3	5-6	Park Hae-jin	Kanggol Village, Boseong County, Jeollanamdo	July 13, 2008, July 20, 2008
3	The Family arrive at the village and enjoy the homeowners' apricot tea before heading off into the bamboo forest for some games and harvesting of bamboo shoots. In the forest, the Family act out a martial art movie scene under Sooro's instruction before delighting themselves further with some bamboo climbing and endurance games. Highlights include 1) Hyori's team dominating every game despite having the "worst" members of Jaesuk and Jongshin and 2) an emerging rivalry between Haejin and Jaesuk. Returning to the house, the Family decide to catch a chicken for dinner, with Jaesuk and Daesung exhibiting their characteristic cowardice, and relying on Yejin's quick hands and precision technique for the capture. Highlights of dinner preparation include 1) the "Dumb and Dumber" brothers picking perilla leaves, while fearful of Hyori's scolding, 2) Stepmother Kim and Chundrella digging for potatoes, and 3) Jongshin secretively seasoning the stew with ramyun powder. After dinner, the Family play the Saranghae game, using kisses, rather than forehead slaps, as punishment for laughter. During bedtime rankings, Chunhee endures a pitiful fall to nearly last place from a first-place finish during the previous episode and Hyori fights for attention and votes from the Family men by performing the Wonder Girls song "So Hot". In the morning, Jaesuk moderates the trivia question wake-up mission with broken glasses, with Daesung and Jaesuk held responsible for breakfast duty. Highlights of breakfast preparation include the inability of the "Dumb and Dumber" brothers to flavor the mud-snail stew with miso and anchovies, before finally resorting to ramyun seasoning. Following breakfast, the Family perform a morning wake-up dancing exercise before heading out into the mud fields to gather loaches. A running gag of the episode features Jongshin being characterized as an ailing hospital patient in matching pajama top and bottoms. While in the mud field, the Family participate in a water basin carrying race in the shallow waters, featuring 1) Jaesuk and Haejin's rivalry and repeated falls and 2) the ongoing battle between Sooro and Chunhee. After the game, the Family returns home to clean the house and express their gratitude to the homeowners with an audio recording.			
4	7-8	G-Dragon (Big Bang), Shin Sung-rok (Note: Shin Sung-rok filled in for Lee Chun-hee due to scheduling conflicts with other filming. Lee Chun-hee showed up "the next day" for the second episode.)	Baekmiri Village, Geumcheon Valley, Namhae Island, South Gyeongsang	July 27, 2008, August 3, 2008
4	The Family welcomes guests G-Dragon and Sungrok, who fills in for the busy Chunhee, before heading to the village house. Dressing up in large latex bib pants, the Family men give each other wedgies, followed by a runway show, before everyone head into the river to catch mullets with large nets. After fishing, the Family form two teams to play a game of chicken fight in the waist-level waters. Many humorous moments arise as a result of water leaking into their bib pants, with 1) Sungrok reminding the audience of Chunhee with his clumsiness and 2) G-dragon and Jaesuk being held upside down to drain their bib pants, with mouthfuls of water as a result. Returning home, the Family cook dinner, as Yejin demonstrates her "savage" eyeball-popping fish preparation ways, contrasting against Jaesuk's cowardice. Other highlights of dinner include Hyori supervising "Dumb and Dumber", who gather vegetables while burdened with equal parts fear and doubt and 2) Jongshin and Jaesuk's "snowy" stew seasoning. During dinner, via phone, the Family greet and cheer on with Chunhee, who is away on assignment. After eating, the Family plays the Saranghae game, featuring 1) "love-line" and verbal jabs between Hyori, G-Dragon and Yejin and 2) Jongshin's teeth attacks on Jaesuk. During sleep order rankings, the Family men demonstrate "tough guy" face washing before pairing up for a dance demonstration, featuring the snake-charming Jaesuk and towel-wringing Jongshin, while the women engage in a battle of Yejin's aegyo (cuteness) versus Hyori's dancing. At bedtime, Sooro entertains with a ghost story as the Family falls asleep. During the trivia wake-up mission, Chunhee makes a surprise appearance and is mobbed by Sooro. Chunhee immediately assumes the Chunderella role when tasked with carrying the supplies, forming the "Faulty Brothers" with Sungrok. Rather than the usual assigned breakfast duties, the Family set off on a boat ride to go abalone fishing, featuring scuba diving stories from Chunhee and songs from Sungrok, G-dragon and Jaesuk. On the beach, Sooro and Jongshin trade praises while directing Sungrok, as the other Family members dive for abalone. After a brunch of grilled abalone and rice porridge, the Family forms teams to play a palm-pushing game where Stepmother Kim outduels Chunderella, G-Dragon defeats "imitation C-Dragon" Jaesuk, Daesung bests "Gaesung" Jongshin, Hyori outcharms Sungrok, and Yejin savages G-Dragon. Returning to the house, the Family recall their memories and bestow best wishes for the homeowners via audio recording.			
5	9-10	Jun Jin (Shinhwa)	Bolitgogae Village	August 17, 2008, August 24, 2008
5	The Family welcomes Junjin, celebrating Hyori's new single U-Go-Girl as they meet. After finding the homeowners' house, they go fishing at the river for their first assigned task, taking some time to play in the water. Junjin and Sooro are the aces during this race through water game, with teammates acting as obstacles for the opposing competitor, leading to much foul play from moving-road-block Yejin and upright-wall Sooro. After the game, the Family find nary a fish despite their bean paste and rice bait trap. Returning home for dinner preparation, Hyori attempts to fry a loaf of bread, and with Chunhee away briefly for a hospital visit, Jaesuk endures Stepmother Kim's oppression as he gathers corn, Bruce Lee-style. Meanwhile, Junjin and Yejin pick vegetables in the field, pledging each other votes during sleep order rankings. During soup preparation, forbidden from using ramyun seasoning, the Family men flavor the stew with canned fish and meat, collude carefully to avoid detection from Hyori. After dinner, with Chunhee returning, the Family play the "Truth" game, guessing each other's good and bad points as decided by the other members. During the sleep order rankings, the Family role play to compete to be the most pitiful. Highlights include Jongshin invoking his newborn son, Chunhee bribing with aloe leaves, and Yejin falling to the ground in tears. As bedtime approaches, Junjin, Daesung, and Hyori play with the cameras, singing and dancing to each other's songs, while the other Family members perform the task of night fishing. In the morning, after the trivia wake-up mission, Chunhee selects Hyori from a circle of sycophants to prepare breakfast with him. Highlights of cooking include Hyori using Chunhee's face in lieu of a wall for the throw-and-stick test and Chunhee working hard for praise from Hyori. After eating, the Family learn the U-Go-Girl dance from Hyori as part of the morning exercise before heading off to pick peaches. While in the fields, the Family women, Chunhee, Junjin, and Daesung compete in the "Miss Peach" pageant honors. Finally, the Family play a game on the monkey bars, featuring the "Game Devil" Sooro, high-bar master Junjin, biting man Jaesuk, and an epic women's battle before heading back to the house to express their gratitude for the homeowners with an audio recording.			
6	11-12	Lee Jin-wook	Doteumbyut Village	August 31, 2008, September 7, 2008
6	The Family gathers at the airport and set off for the village. Executing their first assigned task of catching eels, the Family pile rocks as a trap before playing water balloon and water-basin filling games, with the latter eliciting much foul play. Bringing their eels home, the Family boss Chunhee and Jinwook around as they make raspberry wine. During dinner preparation, Jaesuk encounters difficulty catching eel from the water pot before teaching Chunhee how to pick vegetables, Bruce Lee-style. Meanwhile, Yejin and Jinwook slice the eel, Jongshin prepares marinade for it with canned barbecue sauce, and Daesung covertly marks charcoal on Hyori's face. After eating, the Family compose and recite poetry based on the theme of Family, ranging from heartfelt to vengeful, before painting art and calligraphy on a bare wall. During sleep order rankings, the Family attempt celebrity imitations and impromptu poetry. In the morning, the wake-up mission comprises trivia and a tickling test, with Jinwook and Jaesuk relegated to breakfast duty, where Jaesuk becomes increasingly frustrated with Jinwook's inability to cook and barrage of non sequiturs. Following breakfast, the Family herd the goats out to graze, giving the Family the opportunity to play a potato (fertilizer) sack race game, where foul play and Chunhee's clumsiness are in full display. Gathering at the house, the Family audio-record their gratitude for the homeowners and welcome them home.			
7	13-14	Lee Hong-gi (F.T. Island), Taeyeon (Girls' Generation)	Gasong Village, North Gyeongsang	September 14, 2008, September 21, 2008
7	Gathering at the local village, the Family men eagerly welcome Taeyeon while the Family women are largely ignored. Carrying out the first assigned task, the Family catch fish in a nearby stream before heading to a local water hold to perform acrobatic dives off a cliff. Highlights include the members' ages expressed as "levels" and members expressing their future wishes and predictions as they jump, such as Chunhee scolding Sooro and Jongshin requesting respect for the "middle-aged". During dinner preparations, Taeyeon and Chunhee pick pine needles, with Chunhee showing off his ballet moves and crying ability. Meanwhile, Daesung, Sooro, and Jaesuk have difficulty catching and cleaning the fish. "Dumb and Dumber" then encounter challenges when starting the fire while Chunhee spills some boiling water on Sooro. The Family women then compete for best exclamations, with Taeyeon delighting the men. After dinner, the Family work in pairs to prepare rice cakes for the village in celebration of Chuseok, with Hyori and Yejin forming cakes that resemble the Family men including bean insoles for Jongshin before secretively eating Hongki's rabbit cake. As the evening closes, sleep order rankings are determined with the members acting most innocently, featuring a hoppingly cute Yejin and dance performance from Taeyeon. In the morning, Chunhee loses the trivia wake-up mission and selects Taeyeon to help him start a fire before waking everyone up to prepare stuffed pumpkins and rice cakes for the townspeople. Cooking highlights include Chunhee playing rock-paper-scissors with Hyori to gently slap each other with spatulas. After cooking, the Family greet the villagers with their pumpkins, with Hyori singing verses with impromptu lyrics and Daesung getting propositioned by one of the local omonis (mothers). The Family then gather at a local valley to sing songs from The Sound of Music before playing a football-like game, where Sooro accidentally pushes Chunhee off the field and Jaesuk is ignored and chastised by his team. Finally, the Family harvest cabbages before recording a message of gratitude towards the homeowners.			
8	15-16	Shin Hye-sung (Shinhwa)	Hoesang Village, Muan, Jeolla	September 28, 2008, October 5, 2008
8	As the episode begins, Yejin and Chunhee are busy filming an ice cream CF as we catch a glimpse of Jongshin with his infant son. The Family gather at a local village and play around in a lotus pond, competing in a team boat race. Highlights include the repeated capsizing of the boat steered by Hyori's team and the Family members washing and cleaning each other off after the muddy play. Dinner preparations feature 1) "Dumb and Dumber" having difficulty deciding how many pumpkin leaves to pick, 2) Jongshin, Jaesuk, and Hyesung attempting to properly season the soup, and 3) Chunhee being bossed around and nagged by the tandem of Hyori and Yejin. Following dinner, the Family enjoy a game of guessing each other's pet peeves, weaknesses, and other habits worthy of laughter. Highlights include the teasing of Jongshin's "weak body" and frequent body scratching. Upon losing this game of verbal warfare, Hyori's team is assigned to pick sweet potatoes after the sleeping order is determined. For this episode, the rankings involve everyone competing to act the most despicably, while yet exhibiting charisma. Highlights include Jongshin garnering repeated face splashings due to his unbecoming behavior and Hyesung attempting to woo both female Family members simultaneously. Ultimately, Jongshin and Hyori prevail for first place victories. At bedtime, Hyori delights the cameras with her flirtatious antics before the Family doze off. The wake-up mission involves each member catching a thrown pillow immediately following a somersault, eventually leaving Hyesung and Yejin with breakfast duty. The pairing proceed to peacefully cook kimbap and egg soup, only to have Hyori and Jaesuk nagging them throughout the process. After brunch, the Family head off to pick persimmons in the field, engaging in a verbal game of puns centered on the Korean word for persimmon, before forming teams to play a game of racing up a hill of hay. Highlights include inept physical performances from Jaesuk and Jongshin leading to their trademark sad accordion music. The episode ends with the homeowners being welcomed home.			
9	17-18	U-Know Yunho, Xiah Junsu (TVXQ)	Haenoemi Village, Jeolla	October 12, 2008, October 19, 2008
9	The Family gather at the village, with Sooro sporting an extra short haircut. On the way to the beach, Sooro jokes about his fan boards. The Family catch a variety of small fish and crabs, then help the local fisherman in sorting their catch, feeding the leftovers to the seagulls. On the shores, Daesung and Yunho captain teams for a race game in the shallow water. Highlights include foul play from Hyori, who throws mud at and pulls at the pants of Junsu, and Yejin who places a bucket on Jaesuk's head before tossing away his fins. Gathering back at the house, Yejin teaches Junsu to prepare the fish at the distress of Jaesuk and Hyori while Yunho and Daesung go off to harvest vegetables, conspiring to bribe the women with sweet potatoes. Armed with ramyun powder, Jongshin ensures the seafood stew is appropriately seasoned. After dinner, the Family play a team-order guessing game to determine the ordinal ranking of the opposing team on topics such as IQ and frequency of being dumped (romantically). Highlights include Jongshin revealing his rejection stories, Jaesuk's "ladies man" phase, Junsu's difficulty with math, and Dumb and Dumber discovering how similar their IQs are. Afterwards, the Family perform dances to determine sleep order rankings, supplemented with some gifts of sweet potatoes and chocolate bars. In the morning, Jaesuk operates a cups and balls game for the wake-up mission where Jongshin, Jaesuk, and Sooro are assigned breakfast duty. After catching a few fish in the local pond, Jaesuk is oppressed to perform menial labor as the youngest of the trio. Beyond cleaning fish and fetching supplies, Jaesuk must carry Sooro and Jongshin to the faucet as the latter wash their hands. After breakfast, the Family head to the fields to seed the soil, but not before playing a rolling race game. Members pair up to roll themselves back and forth a large vinyl sheet, competing for best times, with the winning team of Sooro, Jongshin, and Chunhee being relieved of seed planting duty as their reward.			
10	19-20	Kim Jong-kook (New Family Member)	Heoumri Village, Chungcheong	October 26, 2008, November 2, 2008
10	The episode opens with the Family enthusiastically welcoming Jongkook as a new member, focusing on Hyori's bashfulness as the "One Man" arrives to pair up with Daesung to form the "small-eyed brothers". Arriving at the village, the Family head to the wheat fields to harvest first by hand, then with a combine operated by Sooro. Highlights include 1) Hyori acting demure in front of Jongkook and 2) Jongkook reluctantly waving to the Family women before sheepishly helping them descend from the combine. The Family then play a game competing to build the larger hay stack, followed by a game of dressing up one member as the funniest looking scarecrow. With the production crew acting as judge, Chunhee bests Jongkook, with both donning lipstick, false lashes, and blush, causing the losing Jongkook to feign frustration as he runs into a patch of mud with his new sneakers. Returning to the house, the Family catch a duck for dinner and split into teams for dinner preparation. Hyori and Chunhee take turns climbing on each other's backs while gathering chestnuts, with Chunhee painfully stepping barefoot on a thorny chestnut burr. Jongkook joins the "Dumb and Dumber" tandem to dig for ginseng, while Sooro and Jongshin lounge about the house, directing Yejin in fire starting. As the Family re-gather, Chunhee attempts to delay Jongkook's return home to allow Hyori time to wash Jongkook's muddied sneakers. Following dinner, the Family visit a local music hall to practice for a village performance. The members reveal impressive talent with their singing and playing of instruments, although Jaesuk and Sooro garner criticism for their overwhelming backing vocals. Returning home, sleep order rankings allow the Family men to show off their boxing skills, with entertaining performances from water-spitting Jaesuk, buttocks-punching Jongshin, and easily toppled Chunhee. Bedtime features the last placed Jaesuk relegated to sleeping in the bedroom corner along the hallway to the bathroom. In the morning, the wake-up mission requires the Family to guess words written on a rapidly rotating propeller, concluding with Sooro and Chunhee tasked with breakfast duty. Highlights include 1) Chunhee washing radishes with a bar of soap, 2) Chunhee and Sooro shaving the radish with their teeth and 3) Sooro frying eggs with vinegar rather than oil. At the same time, the other Family members milk cows in the barn before returning home as Hyori and Daesung help to finish breakfast preparations, making some ice cream along the way. After breakfast, the Family feed the cows and head to an outdoor stage to perform for the village. A mini concert ensues, featuring a group cover of "Kite" by Linus and solo performances from Daesung, Jongkook, Hyori, and Jongshin.			
11	21-22	Rain	Soyool Village, Yeosu, South Jeolla	November 9, 2008, November 16, 2008
11	The Family welcome Rain, who along with Jongkook and Daesung, form the three "slanty-eyed" brothers. At the homeowners' house, the Family send off the omonis (mothers) before setting off in boats to harvest octopus. Afterwards, the Family play an obstacle race game on the beach, highlighted by 1) the members becoming conscious of their image upon realizing Rain will be attracting a large viewing audience, 2) Jongkook's frustration upon slipping and losing to Rain, 3) Yejin being dropped three times by Daesung and Jaesuk, and 4) the sabotaging efforts of Yejin and Hyori as they impede the opposing team with hair-pulling, kicking, and sprawling. During dinner preparation, Rain overcomes his averseness to handling octopus with Yejin's help, Dumb and Dumber can do nothing right as they endure combination scoldings from Yejin and Hyori, and Jongshin furtively prepares seasoning from store-bought marinade and ramyun powder. As Chunhee gathers and washes the vegetables, he sustains the oppression of two Stepmother Kims, in Sooro and Jongkook. After dinner, the Family face off in one-on-one boasting battles, where preposterous exchanges take place between Rain and Chunhee, Jaesuk and Jongshin, Hyori and Yejin, Jongkook and Daesung, and Sooro and Chunhee, including ridiculously topics such as television-watching ability, fame resulting from associating with Kang Ho-dong, crying to songs when drunk, and frequent flyer miles. During sleep order rankings, the Family men dance while donning an Afro wig and gold chain and Yejin bribes her way to first place among the women with cookies. As the Family heads to bed, Jongkook departs to prepare for his comeback broadcast performance the following day. In the morning, the wake-up mission comprises a needle-threading task, finally resulting in Rain and Chunhee tasked with breakfast duty. Although only able to catch one fish, Rain and Chunhee prepare a tasty dumpling and fish soup with the broth Rain brought. Following breakfast, the Family head to the beach to play a game of queen dodgeball, where teams protect their respective queens of Hyori and Yejin, highlighted by Jaesuk's multiple body shots. After Hyori's team victory, the Family gather to clean the fishing nets before wiping down the house and welcoming the homeowners home.			
12	23-24	Cha Tae-hyun	Gamsan Village, Jeju Island	November 23, 2008, November 30, 2008
12	The Family gather at the airport, with Cha Tae-hyun easily integrating with the other members. After locating the house, they set off to pick tea leaves, highlighted by Chunhee chasing down Sooro and Jaesuk and Taehyun personifying leaves as various girl group members. With the first assigned task complete, the Family play their first game, "Catch the Tail", featuring Taehyun becoming easily exhausted and a game of the "worsts" as Chunhee-Jongshin battle Jaesuk-Taehyun with much foul play. Returning to the house for dinner preparations, Jaesuk, Taehyun and Jongkook proceed to gather beansprout stalks, with the latter two ganging up on Jaesuk to force him to taste seeds and chop down the stalks. At the same time, Chunhee endures the oppression of Yejin and Hyori as he picks flowers and recites poetry, while Daesung starts dinner at the house, under the supervision of Sooro and Jongshin. After the meat stew dinner, the Family drink their newly harvested tea and play a game of guessing each other's embarrassing habits and experiences. Highlights include Daesung revealing his text message exchanges with a female idol, Taehyun falling asleep drunk next to garbage dumpster, and Jongkook admitting he cried when drunk. For sleep order rankings, the Family members reenact a scene from "My Sassy Girl", with highlights including Jongkook's awkwardness towards Hyori, Sooro protecting Hyori's feelings, Chunhee pointing out Hyori's short temper and morning bloatedness, and Taehyun revealing the director's (PD) fondness for Hyori. At bedtime, the Family share laughs as Chunhee shows a picture of Taehyun's swollen bee-stung lip. In the morning, the wake-up mission calls for the members to catch a piece of paper while butting with their heads against Jaesuk's. "Dragon Brothers" Jongkook and Taehyun are assigned breakfast duty and set off to find potatoes and fermented soybean, only to find a persistent praying mantis in their way. Meanwhile, the rest of the Family pick tangerines, with the Hyori and Yejin competing to see who is most adorable when eating oranges. During stew preparations, Taehyun calls his wife for assistance, only to find their recipe is grossly mistakened, but eventually conjure up a serviceable breakfast menu. After eating, the Family feed the cattle and take a break to play a game of team "musical chairs" with a large haystack, featuring Taehyun's biting foul play and Jongshin's backwards underpants. Returning to the house, the homeowners send the Family off with farewell gifts.			
13	25-26	Lee Soo-kyung	Seogmodo Village, Ganghwa	December 7, 2008, December 14, 2008
13	The Family men enthusiastically welcome the female guest, Lee Soo-kyung, while Yejin and Hyori act displeased. The Family separates into two teams to prepare to make kimchi: 1) picking cabbage from the fields and 2) gathering clams from the seaside, before joining up at the beach. Here, Daesung and Chunhee select teams for the first game of the day: one member must lift and rotate his partner around his body. Highlights of the game include the Hyori embarrassingly revealing her weight and Jaesuk's series of face plants into the mud. After the game session, the rest of the Family continue with kimchi preparation while Jaesuk, Daesung, and Sooro mischievously head off to town to seek out other necessary ingredients. When they reconvene, the Family proceed to prepare a large batch of kimchi before quickly cooking and enjoying dinner in the winter cold. The evening concludes with a play-acting break-up scene. Highlights include Hyori and Jaesuk requesting the return of each other's clothing. The Nation's Siblings' performances garner them first-place rankings, although Jaesuk is, nonetheless, relegated to cramped sleeping quarters. The next morning, a watermelon seed spitting game enables the selection of Jaesuk, Daesung, and Yejin for breakfast duty. Highlights of breakfast cooking include Jaesuk and Daesung's dramatic medical resuscitation of the dough used for cut noodles. After eating, the Family distribute their kimchi to the villagers, eliciting delight with their jokes, dancing, and singing. Following, the Family enjoy the last game of the day: one team must resist being dragged off a plastic tarp by the opposing team. Finally, the Family complete their last assigned task of planting garlic in the farm fields before welcoming the return of the homeowners.			
14	27-29	Jang Hyuk	Noonkkot Village, Gangwon	December 21, 2008, December 28, 2008, January 4, 2009
14	Episodes 27-29 comprises a special New Year's edition three-episode arc with guest Jang Hyuk, with episode 28 featuring previously unaired scenes as "X-Files". The episodes begin with Sooro making an appearance at a basketball game and Hyori and Chunhee attending Daesung's musical. At the village, the Family heartily greet Hyuk, with Hyori disappointed to find him already married. Jongshin, Jaesuk, Yejin, Jongkook and Hyuk head into the woods to chop down a tree, with Hyuk getting teased for working so seriously. While carrying the felled tree home, Jaesuk and Jongshin slip into a freezing stream. Meanwhile, Chunhee, Hyori, Sooro and Daesung spread sawdust over the fields as fertilizer. Afterwards, the Family recombine for a sled race down a snowhill, with highlights including Hyori expressing her displeasure at Jongkook for losing and Jaesuk falling into the ditch during the last round. Later, the Family visit a turkey farm to catch one for dinner, with Daesung and Jaesuk displaying their usual hesitation while Hyuk and Chunhee chase down an escaped bird. Returning to the house, the Family separate for dinner preparations. Jaesuk teaches Hyuk about comic timing ("Timing is now") while digging for hwanggi roots, while Hyori and Jongkook awkwardly head off to a neighbor's house to barter a song and dance for some sweet potatoes and kimchi. While the turkey cooks, Hyuk is teased for his attempts at humor, with Hyori mischievously spreading mud on the faces of Jongkook and Hyuk. After dinner, the Family wrap Christmas presents for the local village children, who are introduced with self-portraits. The members then split into teams and deliver the gifts. Later, the Family, along with Hyuk, gather to play a game of quizzing each another with an array of embarrassing questions. Highlights include Hyori favoring TOP over Daesung as her favorite BigBang member, Hyuk recommending the need for Jongkook to find a dominating mate, Jongkook being questioned about his history with Yoon Eun-hye, Daesung clarifying his female idol texting scandal, and Jaesuk's tendency of wearing tight pants. Returning to the house for sleep order rankings, the Family sing and dance as part of a karaoke performance, while Chunhee and Yejin present the members with ugg boots and cookies, respectively. Episode 28 then shifts to the unaired "X-Files". The first sequence (with Kim Dong-wan) shows the Family spitting watermelon seeds on themselves, followed by Chunhee and Yejin enduring a scary night-time mission. The second sequence highlights the rivalry between Park Hae-jin and Jaesuk after their water race and during bamboo climbing. The third sequence looks back on the episode with G-Dragon and Shin Sung-rok, revisiting the bib pants runway performance and Yejin and Jongshin struggling with their bib pants. The fourth sequence shows Hyori reliving her most embarrassing moments on the show during the guessing game with Shin Hye-sung, followed by Yejin rejecting men at a mock club scene. The fifth sequence with the TVXQ guests shows Sooro and Jongshin stressing over developing their careers then the Family men's dance performances for sleep order rankings. The six sequence looks back at the appearance by Rain, with Chunhee teaching him how to pick green onions, and shows unseen footage of a beach obstacle race. The final sequence with Cha Tae-hyun revisits a surprise phone call from Gong Yoo to the Family while he is away during military training. The episode concludes with a review of the personal milestones of the Family, including marriages, births, and career comebacks. Episode 29 returns to Jang Hyuk's guest appearance, with the Family begrudgingly waking before sunset to welcome the new year, 2009, with their resolutions and expectations on the beach as the sun rises. Highlights include Hyori teasing Jongkook about their blossomoning love-line, with Jongkook's refusal, and Jongshin pledging to pay back his loans and wishes for the invention of a 'fountain of youth' pill. While on the beach, the Family play a race game of bringing a handful of water from the waves to determine breakfast duty. Returning to the village, Hyuk, Jaesuk, and Sooro procure potatoes and fresh bean curd for breakfast preparation, with Hyuk struggling to fry potato pancakes without a flame and oil, thus losing confidence along the way. Later, Jaesuk and Sooro secretively season the bean curd soup with ramyun powder while Hyuk is distracted. After eating, the Family head to the field to accomplish their assigned task of harvesting flower roots, which they snack on with some pepper paste. Yejin and Hyori then choose teams for a pinata-like game of breaking a paper-mache container of sawdust over a member seated underneath it. Highlights include the frequently errant throws from Jongshin and Hyuk and Jongkook pitifully enduring the sawdust falling on him.			
15	30-31	Song Chang-eui	Ihmegol Village, Nonsan, South Chungcheong	January 11, 2009, January 19, 2009
15	The Family gather at the village, with Changeui revealing he attended school with Chunhee. After arriving at the house, the Family split into teams for fishing and soybean cooking duties. Jongkook and Hyori form an awkward pairing as they stay at the house to cook: playing a face slapping game, chatting with the camera, exercising with kitchen utensils. The two then join up with the other Family members, who, unsuccessful at catching a fish, decide to play a race game hopping over bales of hay to break through a wall made from a plastic sheet. Highlights include Hyori and Yejin playing foul as they sabotage Jongkook, who is blamed for being in a game slump. Returning to the house, the Family prepare meju from the fermented soybean, with a kiss on the cheek for the victor, Changeui. Further preparing for dinner, Chunhee, Sooro, and Changeui gather strawberries from a green house, while Hyori scolds Dumb and Dumber at home. At the same time, Jongshin, Yejin, and Jongkook gather peppers and sesame leaves, with the latter two having fun with wearing the leaves as masks before Jongshin heads off to find some fish and meat for the stew. After dinner, the Family play a phone call game where members phone a friend to try to have say a pre-selected phrase. Highlights include Yejin convincing her friend that 'Jongshin is manly' and Jongshin trying to have his friend say 'Yejin is loveable'. To determine sleep order rankings, the Family perform a scene from Changeui's musical, with highlights include Hyori scolding Jongkook, Sooro's cringeworthy singing, and Daesung integrating gift-giving with his performance. The women follow with their performances, featuring Hyori attacking Jongkook without reason. As the Family go to bed, Jaesuk performs voice imitations of TOP and Sooro, to everyone's delight. The morning wake-up mission calls for the members to spread their legs to touch a bottle of water. Changeui, Chunhee, and Hyori gather mushrooms for the stew and Changeui and Hyori grow closer during cooking. Afterbreakfast, the Family peel and dry persimmons as one of their assigned tasks, then engage in a game afterwards where the members stand on top of each other to bite off a hanging persimmon. Highlights include Jongshin's massive heel spacers, repeated falls by Daesung, and Yejin almost performing the splits while being raised.			
16	32-33	Daniel Henney	Yongdok Gweshi Village, North Gyeongsang	January 25, 2009, February 1, 2009
16	The Family gather at the airport with Daniel Henney helping Jaesuk with his "timing is now" phrasing in the bus. At the village house, Henney helps to wash rice, reenacting a scene from the movie Ghost with Hyori. Afterwards, the Family head to the dock to clean and dry squid, featuring Hyori singing songs by Kara and Daesung showing embarrassment as we are reminded of his idol text message exchange. The Family then head to the beach to play a wrestling game between teams headed by Henney and Jongkook. Back at the house, the Family separate into teams to prepare dinner, with Henney, Chunhee, and Jaesuk charged with buying rice cakes, where Henney acts out a CF. Meanwhile, Jongkook and Daesung strategize over sleep order rankings as they pick vegetables in the greenhouse. At the house, Jongshin becomes more familiar with Sooro and Jaesuk and Jongshin attempt to rescue the squid stew with ramen seasoning. After dinner, the Family perform a hanbok fashion show, with Jaesuk attempting to act as suave as Henney, before everyone helps to prepare rice cakes for the village. The Family then gather around a fire to share stories of first loves before Henney sings Bob Dylan's "Knockin' on Heaven's Door". Finally, after Henney distributes gift hoodie sweatshirts, the Family perform a dancing demonstration and the sleep order rankings are determined. Highlights include Jongkook and Hyori showing displeasure with being ranked last place. In the morning, the wake-up mission involves using one's head to break a gourd that is launched by a seesaw. For breakfast, Hyori and Henney buy fresh snow crabs for steaming and stewing. After eating, the Family greet Hyori's mother and sister, who happen to be in town, then finish preparing the rice cake soup for the village elders. Later, the Family head to the beach to play a game where pairs squat and balance while greeting the new year. Highlights include Hyori trying to place a clamshell in her boot, Hyori accidentally kicking Jongkook in the groin, and Daesung inadvertently head-butting Jaesuk. The Family then perform the last assigned task of harvesting leeks from the field before welcoming back the homeowners.			
17	34-35	TOP (Big Bang)	Bukdong Village, Gangneung, Gangwon	February 8, 2009, February 15, 2009
17	Opening with Chunhee on a modeling shoot and Sooro preparing for college entrance exams, the Family gather at the village and enthusiastically welcome TOP. Donning bib pants, they set off on a boat to harvest fishing nets. Highlights include Jaesuk singing as TOP in Haru Haru and the Family finding a wide variety of fish, as well as a small shark, in their nets. Returning to land, Sooro arrives and the Family enjoy a "capture the flag" game, fighting in the snow; much foul play ensues, largely aimed at Jaesuk. At the house, TOP overcomes some apprehensiveness to assist Yejin in the angler fish preparation before he, Hyori, and Chunhee depart to the market for dinner ingredients, buying six steamed buns along the way. Meanwhile, Dumb and Dumber kindle the embers of a love-line between Jongkook and Yejin who busily prepare the fish stew and clean the bean sprouts: "the two people who came in one car, but had to switch to two cars right in front." At the same time, the Forty Brothers collect peppers with Jongshin climbing atop Sooro's shoulders. With everyone returning home, Hyori shares her steam bun with Jongkook, Daesung with TOP, Chunhee with Yejin, Sooro and Jongshin, with only Jaesuk intentionally excluded. As Hyori prepares the potato pancakes, the Family form lines for a bite, providing an opportunity for Jaesuk and Jongkook to do battle in excluding each other from eating the pancake. After dinner, the Family verbally duel to guess the members' first impressions of each other, with teases aimed at Daesung's appearance, Chunhee's uselessness, and Jongshin's sickness and talkativeness. To determine sleep order rankings, the Family conduct individual rap sessions after a demonstration performance from TOP, featuring Jaesuk teasing Jongkook about his small eyes and his scandals with Yejin, Hyori, and Eunhye, Jongkook thanking Hyori for capturing his heart with a "pure white steamed bun", and Hyori scolding the Family men while touting her palindromic name. In the morning, the wake-up mission involves throwing a tennis ball at a Velcro bulls-eye target worn by Jaesuk; Jongshin, Jaesuk and TOP are held responsible for breakfast. The trio gather some fresh trout from a local fishery with TOP preparing the fish for grilling. Meanwhile, Daesung awakes to boss TOP around, and with the two respected elders present, TOP is forced to concede to Daesung's criticisms. Later, Daesung reveals embarrassing facts and nicknames about "Bingu" TOP, further fueling his ire. During cooking of the kimchi stew, the men discover they've added the potatoes too late, so are forced to prematurely serve the stew with the kimchi and other ingredients getting burned, thus incurring the criticisms of the other Family members for the half-cooked potatoes. After eating, the Family head to a frozen pond and show off their figure skating abilities, highlighted by Daesung's ice dance and Chunhee clumsily dropping Yejin onto the ice, before the Family engage in a skating race across the pond. Later, the Family perform their last assigned task of harvesting shiitake mushrooms in a greenhouse nursery before welcoming back the homeowners.			
18	36-37	Yoona (Girls' Generation)	Wae Ahm Village, Chungcheong	February 22, 2009, March 1, 2009
18	The episode opens with Sooro and Jongkook practicing for theater and concert performances, respectively. Gathering at the village, the Family men heartily greet Yoona; whose surprise presence causes Chunhee to fumble with his sunglasses and Daesung to run to her, laterally, with delight. At the house, the Family separate into two teams to build a ceremonious 'Full Moon House' with Daesung, Chunhee and Sooro overjoyed upon being selected by Yoona for cutting bamboo. Highlights of the bamboo gathering team include Daesung and Chunhee fighting for Yoona's affections, with Daesung laying on top of bamboo shoots to create a walking path for Yoona, only to be hindered by Sooro as he inquires about the girl idol Daesung text-messaged. Meanwhile, Jaesuk, Jongkook, and Jongshin are, to their dismay, delegated to piling straw and twigs while enduring Hyori's supervision. Highlights include Hyori threatening to withhold Jongkook's wages if he dares to take a break and Hyori caning the three men when their attempts at humor are deemed not funny. As the Family re-gather, they play an ice-block carrying game, with the men performing ridiculous demonstrations of strength to earn Yoona's pick, including Jongshin breaking an ice-block with his head. During the game, Hyori discovers her heavier body weight compared to Yoona has put her team at a significant disadvantage as Sooro compares Yoona's weight to cotton and feathers. Later, back at the house, the Family pop rice kernels to be served with molasses, with highlights including Jaesuk testing Jongkook's patience as the latter teaches the Dumb MC how to operate the popping machine and Daesung delightfully accepting Yoona feeding him mouthfuls of the confection. Afterwards, to prepare dinner, Jongkook and Yejin are sent to the market to find vegetables and nuts, but to interfere with a running 'love scandal' gag, Chunhee is instructed to tag along and act as an interloper, only to have the couple furtively escaping his oversight. Meanwhile, Daesung flirts with Yoona as they harvest vegetables on the field, only to be interrupted by a stray dog. At the house, Sooro and Jongshin escape Hyori to procure meat for dinner while Jaesuk remains behind to assist Hyori, to his disappointment. After enjoying the five-grained rice dinner, the Family gather to set their 'Full Moon House' ablaze while Yoona puts on a dance performance of 'Gee' and Hyori's '10 Minutes' and the members declare their wishes for the Family. Highlights include Yejin jealously requesting no future female guests are invited, Hyori hoping the men treat her more as a feminine 'baby', and Jongshin wanting to be in more CFs like Chunhee. During sleep order rankings, Hyori, with Sooro's help, plays a prank on the other Family members as she feigns disappointment over her last place ranking. Before bedtime, Daesung distributes gift packages his fans have sent the Family, including personalized hooded sweat-shirts for each member. In the morning, the Family must pick up a plate using only their feet while flipping their bodies backwards. Highlights include Jongshin's lack of flexibility and the Family teasing Jongkook for giving advice to Yejin as part of their 'love scandal'. Charged with breakfast duty, Jongshin, Daesung, and Yoona fail to locate fish from the local stream so are forced to cook ramen for breakfast, enduring Hyori's ire. Meanwhile, the other members build a straw thatch-roof as part of their assignments. After breakfast, the Family choreograph and perform a Natta (traditional percussion) show for the local village. Following an encore performance, the Family fulfills wishes by the audience, including a slow-dance with Jaesuk; aegyo demonstrations by Jongshin, Sooro, and Jongkook; and trot acts from Daesung and Yoona.			
19	38-39	Lee Beom-soo	Sambae Village, Gangwon	March 8, 2009, March 15, 2009
19	The Family gather at the village, teasing Jongkook and Hyori over their movie "date" and Jongshin's hair perm. Arriving at the barn, the Family herd cattle and spread sawdust. Highlights include Chunhee driving the forklift and Sooro's Bruce Lee-style bag tearing. After completing this assigned task, the Family join forces creatively to film an advertisement (CF) for Korean beef, the local cuisine, based on the theme of a "love scandal" between Hyori, Yejin, and Yoon Eun-hye. The Family then move on to their first game, where the object is to race down and up a large pile of hay while carrying a basin of water. Highlights include the members attempting to introduce humor by spilling and falling into the water, with foul play along the way. The game also features an accidental slip of the tongue by Yejin that becomes the reoccurring catchphrase of the episode. Returning home, the Family is delighted to find beef provided to them for dinner. As Bumsoo, Yejin, and Jaesuk gather quail eggs, Sooro and Chunhee head off to gather garlic. At the house, Jongshin, Hyori, Jongkook, and Daesung fall to temptation as they devour most of the beef for themselves, only to go into immediately cover-up mode as the others starting returning home. As Sooro returns, however, he discovers his quest for meat is stifled with most having been eaten. After dinner, the Family visit a local school to play a game guessing each member's childhood report card comments. Highlights include Yejin battling Jongkook to reveal his less mature childhood tendencies and how comparable the present day personalities of most members are to those from their grade school days. Upon returning home, the Family role play a scene from Bumsoo's drama to determine sleep order rankings, highlighted by Jongshin's surprising "Eh" sound. Before going to bed, the Family start preparing steamed buns, featuring an emergency resuscitation of dough by Jaesuk and Bumsoo and Chunhee kindly staying up with Sooro to stir the red beans. In the morning, the wake-up mission comprises a cooking pot high-kick challenge, with Daesung, Jongkook, and Bumsoo tasked with breakfast. While the trio digs for mudfish, highlighted by multiple slips in the mud, the rest of the family resume cooking of steamed buns, highlighted by Chunhee being splashed by a defunct water faucet. By early afternoon, the trio of cooks finally complete their loach stew, featuring a wide assortment of random ingredients. After eating, the Family welcome the homeowners' return.			
20	40-41	Hwang Jung-min	Unho Village, Jeolla	March 22, 2009, March 29, 2009
20	The Family gather at the village, teasing Jongkook over his new song and music video for 'Happy Virus'. Taking on their first assigned task, the Family board a boat to go octopus fishing, cooking ramen during the ride. Jongshin soon becomes seasick and must lay down as the other members pull octopus from the bait and joke around with megaphones. Back on dry land, the Family form teams with an aegyo paper-rock-scissors battle to play an 'airplane' game with one member hold up another with his feet. Highlights include Jongshin drooling on Jaesuk, Jungmin making face-to-face contact with Chunhee, and Jaesuk spitting water on Sooro. Back at home, Jongkook and Yejin are teased for wearing matching pink clothes, enduring 'newlywed' jokes from Daesung, with which Jongkook counters with threats of violence. Meanwhile, Jungmin, Jaesuk, and Sooro engage in some farming Olympic competition as they gather onions and cabbage and Hyori and Chunhee gather fresh salt from a local mine, with the latter tricked into swallowing spoonfuls of salt. With the Family re-gathering for dinner, Jungmin assists with soup cooking by tossing in carelessly chopped vegetables and half-eaten garlic. After dinner, the Family form teams for a drawing and painting competition, with Hyori and Yejin's contrasting expressions and Daesung's novice abilities drawing much laughter. To determine sleep order rankings, the Family act out a piggyback date scene from Jungmin's drama, featuring complaints of the men who must carry and endure Hyori's body weight and a Konglish fight between Jaesuk and Hyori. After the men are ranked, they take turns confronting the women while being 'held back'. At bedtime, the Family play a prank on Sooro by pretending that Daesung would be leaving the show with this being his last evening. In the morning, the Family gather oysters from the beach, then play their wake-up mission on the muddy shores, where they must swing their bodies around a horizontal beam. Although only Jongkook succeeds, he is assigned breakfast duty with Jungmin and Sooro while the other members return to bed. After harvesting potatoes from the field, the three prepare curry rice while singing along to The Lion King. Following breakfast, the Family bid farewell to the returning homeowners.			
21	42-43	Kim Won-hee	Hangae Village, Seongju, North Gyeongsang	April 5, 2009, April 12, 2009
21	The episode opens with Jongshin penning a song and Jongkook playing soccer. Gathering at the village, the Family tease Jongkook for ignoring them while inviting Yoon Eun-hye to his concert and Hyori is intimidated by Wonhee's presence. The Family split into two teams, with one feeding and vaccinating piglets while the other harvesting melons from the green house. Later, the Family re-combine to play a race game with buckets of water balanced atop their heads; highlights include Chunhee tripping and falling and Yejin playing foul against Jongshin. Back at the house, the Family separate into teams for dinner preparation, with Yejin guarding the marbling beef closely. Wonhee acts the queen's role with Jongkook and Chunhee as they shop for pig skin and fashionable pants, while Hyori and Daesung manage to gorge on the beef while picking vegetables, confessing to the other members upon Wonhee's confrontation. At the house, Jongshin and Jaesuk discover they used vinegar instead of cooking wine, resulting in sour braised ribs. During cooking, Wonhee continues to push the women to do labor, causing ire from Hyori and Yejin. Highlights of dinner preparation include Jaesuk pretending to undergo castration, Hyori and Yejin chastisting the men whenever Wonhee's protection is unavailable, and Wonhee carrying out a beef cutting ceremony. After dinner, the Family gather to watch a fan-made music video featuring clips of previous episodes before Kim Tae-won makes an appearance, performing with his guitar. Highlights include Jongshin, Sooro, and Jongkook attempting to reproduce the husky vocals. To determine sleep order rankings, the Family perform a costume fashion show, featuring Daesung's cross-dressing, Sooro and Jongshin as Boys Over Flowers characters, and Jaesuk's dripping and hairy nose, with the three last-ranked men delegated to sleep in the unheated living room. In the morning, the wake-up mission calls for the members to jump over a rolling hula hoop. Wonhee selects Jaesuk and Daesung to assist her with breakfast preparation, with the three catching a chicken from the local farm after much consternation. Meanwhile, the other Family members harvest gastrodia tubers from the field, featuring an impromptu concert encore performance from Jongkook. During cooking, Wonhee secretly seasons the stew with canned meat while Jaesuk and Daesung are distracted by the World Baseball Classic game. To conclude the episode, the last scene filmed from two weeks later shows the Family writing, practicing, and recording a personalized Family Outing theme song.			
22	44-45	Cha Seung-won	Goseong, South Gyeongsang	April 19, 2009, April 26, 2009
22	The Family fly and bus to the local village, with Jaesuk arriving late due to car troubles. All head to a nearby shallow pond to catch fish with their hands, where Seungwon and Sooro compete to catch the most and Hyori guides (and yells at) Jongkook. The Family then divide into two teams to play a racing game where each competitor races through the water while carrying a teammate. Returning to the house, Hyori and Jongkook set out to pick edible flowers while the others remain to prepare dinner from the caught fish, where Sooro is relegated to being a spectator while Seungwon skillfully trims the squid. Hyori and Jongkook joke around in the picturesque flowerbeds and Hyori re-enacts a memorable scene from My Sassy Girl, apologizing for her behavior towards Jongkook because of his muscular arms. Later, Chunhee and Yejin discover Hyori being carried down the mountain path by Jongkook, causing him much embarrassment. Regathering at the house, the Family finish cooking and eating dinner, then perform an individual talent show. Jongkook sprays water through his teeth, Hyori shows off her strong pinching toes, and Jaesuk excels at hiding among the cameramen. After a game of paper rock scissors, Jaesuk, Jongshin, Jongkook, and Seungwon are selected to gather octopus in the local pond for night duty. Meanwhile, the other Family members play a bedtime game where Sooro tricks Daesung and Hyori into believing he has mind-reading powers. In the morning, the Family compete with one another in blowing a ping-pong ball through a tube filled with flour. Highlights include Jongshin standing on a rock to gain a height advantage. After gathering sea snails from the beach, Hyori and Seungwon prepare breakfast while Jongkook is assigned helper duty. Seungwon and Hyori proceed to compete to cook the tastiest dishes, fighting for ingredients and utensils while ordering Jongkook about. Ultimately, the entire Family benefit from the cooking contest as it results in the most delicious breakfast in memory.			
23	46-47	Son Dam-bi	Seonhakdong Village, South Jeolla	May 3, 2009, May 10, 2009
23	The Family gather at the village with Dambi, discovering inclimate weather upon arrival, and head to the canola fields to harvest some flowers. With the men fawning over Dambi, Hyori makes wisecracks at Dambi's expense at every opportunity, only to have the men come to her defense with praise, song and dance. After picking canolas, the pairings of Hyori-Jongkook and Dambi-Chunhee act out "honeymoon picture shoots" among the flowers. As the rain and wind worsen, the Family help, and occasionally sabotage, each other while crossing a small creek before partaking in a race game with the objective of being first to ascend a large haystack. Much foul play ensues during the exhausting battles, including tossed shoes, mud being spread on opponents' faces, and stepping on one another. Returning home, the Family forms subgroups for dinner preparations. The trio of Jongkook, Jaesuk, and Jongshin are charged with gathering soondae sausage ingredients, but mischievously head to a local restaurant to eat rice cakes and other snacks before delighting themselves at a local karaoke, fervently singing and dancing along to songs from Jongshin, Turbo, Dambi, and SNSD. Chunhee happily accompanies Dambi to pick vegetables on the local hillside before procuring a horse carriage ride through town for Dambi and the other Family members on hand. Meanwhile, at the house, Yejin and Hyori engage in a bet over which of the two Jongkook prefers, with situps and push-ups as punishment at stake, and Daesung distresses after momentarily losing sight of Sooro. During dinner, the exhausted and well-fed trio (Jongkook, Jaesuk, and Jongshin) must appear hungry to not reveal their clandestine detour. After eating, the Family compete in a jumping contest to hit their head against a dangling lightbulb, with much teasing of Jongkook during a love-line with Yejin and Hyori. Jaesuk, Hyori, Jongshin and Yejin are tasked with night chores of dog feeding and night chores, but not before an impromptu dance session as the Family attempt to reproduce Dambi's dances in the barn. During night patrol duties, Jaesuk quizzes Hyori about her ideal type before Yejin and Jongshin scare them with screams in the darkness. At bedtime, the Family wish Daesung and Jongkook happy birthdays with a surprise cake. In the morning, the wake-up mission calls for the Family to strike a gong with a mallet grasped by their feet, resulting in Jongshin, Dambi, and Chunhee assigned to breakfast duty. After a catfish song, the Family head to a mud field to play the palm pushing game before heading home to welcome back the homeowners.			
24	48-49	Lee Joon-gi	Bibongneh Village, Sacheon, South Gyeongsang	May 17, 2009, May 31, 2009
24	Gathering at the village, the Family admire Yejin's new perm and welcome Joon-gi. Carrying out the first assigned task of visiting the uninhabited island, the Family build a canopy before playing a water game aimed at pushing the opponents off their float. Highlights include Joon-gi being grouped with Jaesuk and Jongshin for falling into the water so readily and Jongkook coming up with a creative exit strategy when he and Yejin are the last survivors. Back on land, the members pair off to locate dinner ingredients hidden around the island, with one foursome heading off to fish in the ocean while Chunhee scuba-dives for clams. The Family roast the clams and prepare a kimchi stew for dinner, then partake in an individual competition to roast open clams. Coming in last, Jaesuk selects Jongkook, Daesung, and Jongshin to remain late on the island with him to repair a greenhouse while the other members return home. When done with their tasks, the foursome wait for their boatride home by fighting over pieces of a lollipop. Meanwhile, the other members play drawing games in bed before Yejin and Chunhee decide to play a street arcade game and order fried chicken for the returning foursome. Finally, with everyone returning home, the Family enjoy a chicken snack and fall asleep. In the morning, the wake-up mission involves performing a sit-up to avoid a pillow of flour falling on each other's face. Chunhee selects Yejin, Joon-gi and Sooro to accompany him in preparing breakfast, with the foursome setting out into the forest to collect bamboo shoots. While in the forest, Sooro choreographs some dance numbers and an action scene, with Joon-gi playing assassin to Chunhee the prince. During breakfast preparation, Chunhee directs Joon-gi around, to the latter's dismay, but successfully cook a delicious menu of kimchi soup and roasted beef.			
25	50-51	Chu Sung-hoon	Jeongokri Village, Hwaseong, Gyeonggi	June 7, 2009, June 14, 2009
25	The family gathers at the village followed by the arrival of the strongest guest. Their first task is to take the boat and catch blue swimmer crabs. Unfortunately though, the waves are terrible that day and Jaesuk, Hyori, and Sooro get seasick and are left on the boat while the rest of the family works. Sung-hoon is shown to be very scared of marine animals which gives the rest of the members something to tease him about. The first game quickly afterwards is the highlight of the episode as the members fight 1:1 with Sung-hoon in a wrestling ring. Much laughs are shared when absolutely no one can beat the strongest fighter; including muscle Jongkook and Devil Sooro. Dinner preparations include Hyori, Jongkook, and Sung-hoon going off to get vegetables and while at it, the two strong men play a series of games where the loser receives punishment. Upon reaching home, Jongkook takes out his frustration from losing in most of the games previously on Jaesuk who in turn begins playing around with other members and ends up receiving punishments as well. Selection of members for nightly chores is done by a quiz and whoever gets the wrong answer needs to get off the truck they are riding in and walk all the way back to the wharf. Eventually, Jaesuk, Jongshin, Hyori, and Daesung are chosen for the chores and they go back on the boat for some more fishing. Next morning, the morning mission includes breaking wooden plates by headbutting into them. Daesung loses and selects Jaesuk, Sung-hoon, and Hyori for making breakfast. The four of them go off to the market and buy ray fish to prepare. Sung-hoon with much help from Yejin helps in preparing the fish and shows an adorable side of self by becoming scared of the process.			
26	52-53	None	Samsaeng Village, Hongcheon, Gangwon	June 21, 2009, June 28, 2009
26	Visiting Gangwon-do brought back memories of the first trip of the "Family". As the Farewell Special for Lee Chun-hee and Park Ye-jin, this episode featured no guest. After one year of Family Outing, two of the members are leaving the show. Even with the looming departure, the "Family" still engaged in the tasks and games they usually do for the last time as the original group. They recap the most memorable scenes of Lee Chun-hee and Park Ye-jin in Family Outing during their surprise farewell party. The breakfast featured the "Family" searching for the favorite food of the two leaving members. The whole episode was filled with laughter and melancholy, ending with the tear-filled departure of Lee Chun-hee and Park Ye-jin.			
27	54-55	Park Hae-jin, Park Si-yeon (New Family Members)	Bonghyun Village, Eumseong, Chungcheong	July 5, 2009, July 12, 2009
27	Welcoming two new "Family" members: past guest "Delicate Boy" Park Hae-jin and variety newbie "City Girl" Park Si-yeon. After the departure of Lee Chun-hee and Park Ye-jin comes the arrival of two new members. The first trip as the new "Family" was all about learning the ropes for the new members. Visiting an ostrich farm in Chungcheong-do revealed the rhetoric personalities of the "Park Siblings", creating instant rivalry and discovering clashing personalities. As a surprise for the newcomers, the "Family" set up a "prank" quiz show, even though ended up "failing", to welcome the two members. With the new "Family" comes new pairings and characters: "Kim Wanderers" Kim Jong-kook and Kim Soo-ro, "Kim Soo-ro Button" and the new family, "Park Siblings".			
28	56-57	Kim Min-jun, Ji Sang-ryeol (Note: Ji Sang-ryeol filled in for Dae-sung, due to conflicting schedules with Big Bang activities.)	Yoo Gyea Village, Hapcheon, South Gyeongsang	July 19, 2009, July 26, 2009
28	The "Family" flew high visiting Hapcheon in Gyeongsangnam-do. Due to Kang Dae-sung's absence, two guests were featured. Upon arriving, the "Family" was "tasked" to experience the county's specialty—paragliding—atop Mt. Deaem. However, due to the poor wind conditions, some of the members were unable to do the jump. During dinner preparations, "Tall" Park Hae-jin and "Short" elder Yoon Jong-shin went into a cave to fetch locally fermented kimchi. After dinner, knowing that Kim Jong-kook's relatives reside in the nearby town, Haeinsa, the "Family" split into pairs in order to bring one of his relatives. The losers ended up with early-morning chores, which eventually did not push through due to the bad weather. As the last game, the "Family" played ssireum in a local beach along Hwang River.			
29	58-59	Song Ji-hyo	Chudong Village, Muju, North Jeolla	August 2, 2009, August 9, 2009
29	The Family Outing Summer Horror special: The voices in the abandoned factory! The night games took place inside an abandoned textile factory. The easily scared "Family" is tasked to finish the course in pairs to figure out the mystery behind the place, not knowing the horror hidden within the factory. The team who finished with the longest amount of time has to do the nighttime chores. In this episode a special appearance of "Boys Over Flowers" was also seen, in the form of Kang "Jun-pyo" and Song "Jan-di".			
30	60-61	Choi Soo-jong	Seomdalcheon Village, Yeosu, South Jeolla	August 16, 2009, August 30, 2009
31	62-63	Shin Hyun-joon	Sagimak Village, Chungcheong	September 6, 2009, September 13, 2009
32	64-65	Kim Hyun-joong (SS501), Seung-ri (BigBang) (Note: Seung-ri filled in for Dae-sung, due to a car accident.)	Hajodae Village, Yangyang, Gangwon	September 20, 2009, September 27, 2009
33	66-67	Cha Tae-hyun, Jang Hyuk (Note: Cha Tae-hyun and Jang Hyuk's second time recording on Family Outing. Two guests were featured to fill in for Dae-sung.)	Goyo Village, Mungyeong, North Gyeongsang	October 4, 2009, October 11, 2009
34	68-69	Ha Ji-won	Yeong Il Village, U-do, Jeju Island	October 18, 2009, October 25, 2009
35	70-71	Lee Seung-cheol	Sosuk Village, Namwon, North Jeolla	November 1, 2009, November 8, 2009
36	72-73	Sandara Park (2NE1), Uee (After School)	Sopo Village, Jindo Island, South Jeolla	November 15, 2009, November 22, 2009
36	Last episodes of Park Si-yeon.			
37	74-75	Lee Kyung-shil	Ongjeong Village, Gangwon	November 29, 2009, December 6, 2009
38	76-78	Seo In-young (Jewelry), Park Jin-young	Bangchon Village, South Jeolla	December 13, 2009, December 20, 2009, December 27, 2009
38	In this Christmas special, a third episode featured the X-Files (Unaired footage), having Seo In-young and Park Jin-young stay for 3 episodes.			
39	79-80	Jo Han-sun, Kim Sung-soo	Changpo, Gyeongsang	January 3, 2010, January 10, 2010
39	The Family visits an elementary school where they compete with the students in academic quizzes and outdoor athletics. In the evening, the male Family members dress up as female idol groups and compete in a song contest with Hyori as the judge. The losing team does morning chores; Catching snow crabs. Earlier in the evening, the dinner mission is started. Sungsoo burns the rice but is much better preparing the seafood. Hyori, Jong-Kook, Jongshin, and Hae-jin have helpful comments. Han-sun accompanies Jaesuk and Daesung ("Dumb and Dumber") in search of flatfish. Soo-ro, aka Little Boy Kim, does a self-camera as he goes to get dried fish.			
40	81-82	Nicole (Kara), Tiffany (Girls' Generation)	Pocheon, Gyeonggi	January 17, 2010, January 24, 2010
40	These episodes also feature guest appearances by SNSD: Yoona; Kara: Jiyoung, Seungyeon; B.E.G: Jea, Miryo, Ga-in; and T-ara: Eunjung, Jiyeon.			
41	83-84	Lee Chun-hee, Park Ye-jin, Park Si-yeon	Kanggol Village, Boseong County, Jeollanamdo	January 31, 2010, February 7, 2010
41	For the last episodes of Season 1, previous members Lee Chun-hee and Park Ye-jin along with Park Si-yeon, who has been absent due to a back injury, return for a reunion.			
42	85	Entire Family	SBS Mokdong Broadcasting Center, Yangcheon, Seoul	February 14, 2010
42	The last episode of Season 1; all members of Season 1 returned for the "Family Awards", an awards ceremony where members of the Family receive awards for their achievements in the program.			

=== Season 2 ===
#	Episode #	Family Leader (Note: The "Family Leader" (가장/家長) acts as the main host of that outing and is chosen at the beginning of each pair of episodes. He/she will decide where the rest of the family members sleep, what they will eat for dinner/breakfast, etc.)/Guests	Location	Original Airdates
1	1-2	Taecyeon	Gombaeleong, Inje, Gangwon	February 21, 2010, February 28, 2010
1	The first episodes of Season 2, with a brand new cast, production team, and concept. This show is an orientation for the new members.			
2	3–4	Shin Bong-sun	Surak Village, Sinan-gun, South Jeolla	March 7, 2010, March 14, 2010
3	5-6	Ji Sang-ryeol & Jo Kwon	Hadonggun, Gyeongsang	March 21, 2010, March 28, 2010
3	The "Family" is divided into "Ji Family" and "Jo Family" as they battle it out for the house.			
4	7		Bosung, South Jeolla	April 11, 2010
4	As of this episode, the role of the Family Leader has been abolished.			
5	8-9	Noh Sa-yeon, Jang Dong-min, Kim Kwang-kyu, Tiffany (Girls' Generation), Kim Heechul (Super Junior), Junho (2PM), Gil	Eeonseok Village, Anseong, Gyeonggi	May 2, 2010, May 9, 2010
5	Best Friends Special.			
6	10-11	Lee Sang-yong, Girls' Generation	Yanggu, Gangwon	May 16, 2010, May 23, 2010
6	Army Consolation Performance Special.			
7	12-13	Wonder Girls	Gaemideol Village, Jeongseon, Gangwon	May 30, 2010, June 6, 2010
7	School Excursion Special.			
8	14-15	Gain (Brown Eyed Girls), Nicole Jung (Kara), Shin Hyun-joon (Note: Special performances by Jang Yun-jeong, Tae Jin-ah, and Maya.)	Damyang, South Jeolla	June 13, 2010, June 27, 2010
8	The "Family" helps celebrate the birthday of a centenarian.			
9	16-17	Lee Kyung Shil (comedian), Song Eun-i (comedian), Yang Jung-a (radio dj), So Yi Hyun (actress)		July 4, 2010, July 11, 2010
9	The last episodes of Family Outing Season 2. The family attempts to do crop art, planting rice.			
