= 2 Days & 1 Night =

South Korean reality-variety show

- Also known as: 1 Night 2 Days (1N2D)
- Hangul: 1박 2일
- Hanja: 一泊二日
- RR: 1bak 2il
- MR: 1pak 2il
- Genre: Reality television
- Written by: Lee Woo-jung (Episode 1 – 232); Choi Jae-yeong (Episode 1 – 287); Lee Sak-yeong (Episode 288 – 321); Ji Hyeon-suk (Episode 322 – 411); Jeong Seon-yeong (Episode 412 – 494); Ji Hyeon-suk (Episode 495 – 578); Noh Jin-young (Episode 579 – 700); Choi Hye-ran (Episode 701 – present)
- Directed by: Lee Myung-han; Na Yeong-seok (Episode 1 – 232); Choi Jae-hyung (Episode 233 – 287); Lee Sae-hee (Episode 288 – 321); Yu Ho-jin (Episode 322 – 447); Yoo Il-yong (Episode 448 – 568); Kim Seong (Episode 569 – 578); Bang Geul-yi (Episode 579 – 700); Lee Jeong-gyu (Episode 701 – 813); Joo Jong-hyun (Episode 814 – present)
- Creative directors: KBS Art Vision; Digital Arts Center for Visual Arts
- Starring: Kim Jong-min; Moon Se-yoon; DinDin; Lee Joon; Lee Yong-jin; Lee Ki-taek
- Country of origin: South Korea
- Original language: Korean
- No. of seasons: 4
- No. of episodes: 906 (list of episodes)

Production
- Executive producers: Bak Jung-min; Seo Su-min; Lee Hwang-sun; Han Dong-gyu
- Producers: Kim Young-do; Shin Mi-jin
- Cinematography: Kang Chan-hee
- Camera setup: Multicamera setup
- Running time: Approximately 1 hours 40 minutes (100 minutes)
- Production companies: Koen Media Corporation; Vision Productions

Original release
- Network: KBS2
- Release: August 5, 2007 – present

Related
- 101% Sunday (일요일은 101%); Happy Sunday 다녀오겠습니다 (KBS Joy)

2 Days & 1 Night (Korean: 1박 2일; also known as 1 Night 2 Days; abbreviated as 1N2D) is a South Korean reality-variety show that airs every Sunday at 6:10pm KST on KBS2 beginning August 5, 2007. 1 Night 2 Days used to be one of the two segments (the other segment is The Return of Superman) on Happy Sunday. The episodes are also uploaded with English subtitles weekly on YouTube through KBS World's official channel. The show's current cast members are Kim Jong-min, Moon Se-yoon, DinDin, Lee Joon, Lee Yong-jin, and Lee Ki-taek. The show's motto is "Real Wild Road Variety." Its main concept is to recommend various places of interest that viewers can visit in South Korea. Filming for every new trip is usually done 2 weeks prior to broadcast on KBS2.

1 Night 2 Days has gained much popularity and has garnered high viewer ratings, especially during season 1. After a steady decline during season 2, the combination of the show's third season along with The Return of Superman, helped revive KBS2 Happy Sunday ratings and compete with shows from other networks.

== Synopsis ==
Although there were multiple member line-up changes through each season, 1 Night 2 Days has mostly kept its format. The cast members take various trips throughout South Korea, including many offshore islands. While doing so, members also perform missions at a certain mealtime or point of the day to earn rewards (ex. foods that are famous in the region they visit) and to avoid punishments (ex. going into the water, sleeping outdoors). Guests can be invited not only by the production team but also by the members themselves if they meet the criteria of the episode's concept (ex. ep 396-399).

== History ==
Before 2 Days & 1 Night was first aired, it was preceded by Are You Ready which featured four of the six 2 Days & 1 Night Season 1 members (Kang Ho-dong, Lee Soo-geun, Kim Jong-min, and Eun Jiwon). Are You Ready was canceled due to low viewership ratings and was replaced by 2 Days & 1 Night after 12 episodes. Singer and actor Lee Ji-hoon was offered to join the cast of 1 Night 2 Days but rejected the role to take a role on MBC drama New Heart instead.

Season 1

Season 1 premiered on August 5, 2007 with cast members Kang Ho-dong, Lee Soo-geun, Kim Jong-min, Eun Jiwon, Lee Seung-gi, Noh Hong-chul, Ji Sang-ryul, and Sanggeun the dog mascot. The show later experienced a number of cast member changes. Season 1 broadcast its final episode on February 26, 2012.

Season 2

Season 2 premiered on March 4, 2012 with returning members Lee Soo-geun, Kim Jong-min, and Uhm Tae-woong, who were joined by new members Kim Seung-woo, Cha Tae-hyun, Sung Si-kyung, and Joo Won. Kim Seung-woo left the show in March 2013 to focus on his acting career. He was replaced by fellow actor Yoo Hae-jin. Season 2 officially wrapped up on November 24, 2013.

Season 3

Season 3 premiered on December 1, 2013, with returning members Cha Tae-hyun and Kim Jong-min, and new members Kim Jun-ho, Kim Joo-hyuk, Jung Joon-young, and Defconn. On November 22, 2015, Kim Joo-hyuk left the cast of season 3 on their second anniversary. He filmed his last episodes on November 20 and 21. Yoon Shi-yoon was then rumored to be in talks to join the show and officially became the new member in April 2016. Lee Yong-jin joined the cast as 2 Days & 1 Night's first ever intern in December 2018 after appearing as a guest.

Jung Joon-young left the show on September 29, 2016 due to his scandal regarding a "sexual offence" charged by his former girlfriend, of which he was later cleared. On January 7, 2017, a production member confirmed that Joon-young will return to the show, already having recorded an episode the previous day. Jung Joon-young was permanently removed on March 12, 2019 by the production team due to his involvement in the Burning Sun scandal concerning non-consensual filming during sex and covert distribution of said illegal videos. As a result, KBS announced on March 15 that they are halting the production and broadcast of 2 Days & 1 Night until further announcement is made. The chatroom exposé also affected members Cha Tae-hyun and Kim Jun-ho with allegations of golf gambling in large amounts, resulting in both of them quitting all their television programs, including 2 Days & 1 Night, with immediate effect. This marked the abrupt end of Season 3, unlike the two previous seasons having traditional farewell episodes. This also marked the end of Defconn, Yoon Shi-yoon and Lee Yong-jin's run with the show.

In April 2021, Kim Jong-min and Moon Se-yoon appeared as guests on KBS's entertainment show "Come Back Home" to promote the launch of the new season of "2 Days and 1 Night". As Lee Yong-jin was one of the show's co-hosts, Kim Jong-min revealed that Yong-jin was set to become a permanent cast member during Season 3 and an episode welcoming him was filmed but never aired due to all the scandals surrounding other members during that season.

Season 4

Season 4 was confirmed in November 2019 with Kim Jong-min returning with new members Yeon Jung-hoon, Moon Se-yoon, Kim Seon-ho, DinDin and Ravi. The new cast filmed the first episode on November 12, 2019 which had its first broadcast on December 8, 2019.

On October 20, 2021, both KBS and the production team confirmed that Kim Seon-ho has been removed as a permanent cast member following controversies regarding his personal life. He was edited out of the remaining episodes that were shot prior to his removal in order to "minimize the inconvenience to viewers". Subsequent episodes featured the remaining five cast members until Na In-woo was confirmed to join the show as the sixth member on January 25, 2022, with his first episode airing on February 13, 2022.

On April 21, 2022, Ravi announced his departure from the show, with his last episode broadcast on May 1. On November 28, 2022, Yoo Seon-ho was confirmed to be the newest cast member, with his first episode airing on December 11, 2022.

On June 9, 2024, Yeon Jung-hoon and Na In-woo announced their departure from the show, with their last episode broadcast on July 21. The show took a 3-week break for live coverage of the 2024 Summer Olympics and underwent a re-organization. On August 2, Jo Se-ho and Lee Joon were confirmed to join the show as new members, with their first episode to air on August 18.

On December 9, 2025, Jo Se-ho announced he was leaving the show voluntarily following allegations of him being connected to a criminal organization. His last episode aired on December 28.

On May 12, 2026, Yoo Seon-ho announced his departure from the show, after over 3 years as part of the cast, to focus on his acting career. His last episode aired on May 31. On May 15, 2026, it was announced that model and actor Lee Ki-taek had been chosen as the newest cast member, replacing Yoo Seon-ho. His first episode aired on June 7. Finally, on May 18, comedian Lee Yong-jin was announced as a new cast member in order to have 6 regular members. His first episode aired on June 7.

== Broadcast ==
KBS Drama, KBS Joy has often aired re-runs of 1 Night 2 Days. U-KBS HERAT, a DMB, a digital radio transmission technology developed by South Korea, channel aired the show daily from Monday to Friday at 8:00 p.m. – 9:00 p.m. and recorded the show as one of the "fun to watch" re-runs. KBS World, the international broadcasting service provided by KBS, also started airing English-subtitled episodes (usually one week after the original broadcast) of the show starting from Episode 35 titled as 2 Days and 1 Night.

With 1 Night 2 Days being well received, KBS Joy launched a "female version" of 1 Night 2 Days called 다녀오겠습니다. The first season aired between January 12, 2009 and April 29, 2009. The first season's members were gagwoman Kim Sook, Kim E-Z (former member of Baby Vox), Jeong Jung-ah, Bronwyn Mullen (Afrikaaner ethnicity and member on Global Talk Show), Polina Lipina (Russian ethnicity and member on Global Talk Show), and Kim Ji Hye (member of Korean girl group Cats). Season 2 aired from June 3 to September 16, 2009 with two members from Season 1, Kim Sook and Kim E-Z, and new members, actress and singer Yoo Chae-yeong, movie actress Seo Young, gagwoman Kwon Jin-young, and Kang Ye-bin.

== Cast and character ==
=== Current ===
| Name | Notes |
|---|---|
| Kim Jong-min | Kim Jong-min is one of the original cast members along with Kang Ho-dong, Lee Soo-geun and Eun Ji-won. Kim took a hiatus from the show after episode 18 to fulfill his mandatory military service. Kim rejoined the cast after completing his military service in December 2009. Kim Jong-min is currently the longest-serving member of the cast and the only original cast member to appear in all 4 seasons. He is known for being good at quizzes and the member with the greatest knowledge about history. He has been given the nickname "신바" (acronym of "신나는 바보" aka Cheerful fool) which was first termed by former member, Cha Tae-hyun. |
| Moon Se-yoon | Already an established comedian, Moon Se-yoon joined the cast of Season 4 after previously appearing in Season 3 as a guest. Moon is known for his skit-like humor and for explaining the food the best among the members, thus getting the nickname "먹선생" (aka Food Teacher). He is surprisingly good at singing, playing the guitar, and dancing. He is the member who usually talks to the staff and negotiates with them on behalf of the other members. |
| DinDin | DinDin is a rapper. He is a member who has a lot of previous experience in variety shows, similar to Moon Se-yoon. He frequently shows his love for his parents on the show. His mother also appeared multiple times as a guest. On the other hand, he is the most teased member and it is mostly about his teeth or his so-called "manliness". As homage to his personality, his nickname was "DinDin the Kid". |
| Lee Joon | Lee Joon is a singer, actor, and model. He was a former member of idol group MBLAQ before deciding to become an actor. He most recently appeared in the series The Escape of the Seven. He joined as a new regular member in August 2024. |
| Lee Yong-jin | Lee Yong-jin is a comedian. He appeared during season 3 as an intern and was expected to become a regular member before the season was abruptly cancelled. He joined as a new regular member in June 2026. |
| Lee Ki-taek | Lee Ki-taek is an actor and model. He made his debut in 2021 and is entering the world of variety shows having recently appeared in Bonjour Bakery. He joined as a new regular member in June 2026. |

=== Former ===
| Name | Notes |
|---|---|
| Kang Ho-dong | Kang Ho-dong was the main MC of 1 Night 2 Days. He has won two Grand Prizes (Daesangs) from the KBS Entertainment Awards for his work on the show. He previously starred in an early incarnation of the show, Are You Ready, but it was canceled due to low viewership ratings. On September 9, 2011, Kang Ho-dong left the show and temporarily retired from show business due to allegations of tax evasion, leaving the show with five members. |
| Lee Soo-geun | Lee Soo-geun was one of the original members who started off in the variety show Are You Ready. He was the main MC in season 2, taking over Kang Ho-dong's spot. On November 24, 2013, Lee Soo-geun left the show due to being under investigation for suspicion of online illegal gambling. |
| Eun Ji-won | Eun Ji-won, like Kang Ho-dong and Lee Soo-geun, was one of the original members, who started off in the variety show Are You Ready and appeared on every episode of season 1. Eun Ji-won left the show along with Lee Seung-gi on February 26, 2012, and later returned as a guest in an early episode of season 3. |
| Lee Seung-gi | Lee Seung-gi joined the cast on their trip to Pyeongchang, Gangwon Province. He was the replacement for Noh Hong-chul who left the show for medical reasons. In the show, he is nicknamed Heodang by Kim C due to being often empty-headed. He along with Kim C are considered often the brains of group (in quizzes). In a poll regarding looks, he was ranked first, followed by Sanggeun. Lee Seung-gi left the show with Eun Ji-won on February 26, 2012. |
| MC Mong | MC Mong joined the cast on episodes 19–20 as the replacement for Kim Jong-min who left due to mandatory military service. MC Mong was the last replacement of the cast of the first season. MC Mong has been put on hiatus and did not take part in the filming on September 17, 2010 due to the investigation of his mandatory military service. The producers had made an official announcement that MC Mong's appearance will be deferred until a final judgment has been made and the rest of the five members will continue filming during his absence. Taking into the account of the viewers' feelings and opinions, the episode set to be aired on September 19, 2010 will edit MC Mong's parts as much as possible. This trip will be broadcast in one episode (instead of the usual two episode). They had already started editing MC Mong's parts since the September 12, 2010 episode. It has been confirmed in December 2010 that he has been banned from KBS. |
| Kim C | Kim C joined as a member on their sixth trip (episodes 13–14). He was the replacement member for Ji Sang-ryeol, who appeared in SBS Good Sunday's Family Outing 2. Kim C was absent on their trip to Geochang, South Gyeongsang Province due to the death of his father. Kim C had decided to leave the show in order to devote more time to his music. According to sources, Kim C had originally intended to leave the show after filming the trip for Antarctica, however due to the trip being canceled, his leave was delayed. Kim C approached the producers of the show six months before and informed them of his leave. On the other hand, the members found out Kim C was leaving only two days before the last filming where Kim C called each member as he didn't want to interrupt the mood and bond they had for each other while filming. |
| Ji Sang-ryeol | Ji Sang-ryeol was the first member to leave the show after seven episodes (three trips) due to filming commitments for MBC's drama Yi San. After Ji Sang-ryeol left, Kim Young-chul and Koyote's Shin Ji were special guests for the next couple of episodes before Kim C joined the cast in the next episode (episode 13). A year later, Ji Sang-ryeol appeared as a guest on the show's 70th episode. Ji Sang-Ryul brought a guest along with him on this episode, which was the dog Sangdon, Sanggeun's son. |
| Noh Hong-chul | Comedy show host Noh Hong-chul left after fourteen episodes due to exhaustion and in order to focus on MBC's Saturday variety show Infinite Challenge. He was quickly replaced in the following episode with ballad singer Lee Seung-gi. |
| Sanggeun | Sanggeun, who had gained much popularity, was a Great Pyrenees bred-dog that usually accompanied the members on their trip. Sanggeun's real name was Herbie. When Sanggeun first made his appearance on the show, he was named "Sanggeun" by Ji Sang-ryeol. Sanggeun had appeared in the MBC drama Madame Ahyundong. |
| Uhm Tae-woong | Uhm Tae-woong's first appearance was during the 87th trip to Yangyang, which was broadcast on March 6 and 13, 2011. |
| Kim Seung-woo | Kim Seung-woo was one of the new members and the oldest of season 2. |
| Cha Tae-hyun | Cha Tae-hyun was a member since the first episode of season 2 after he had been recommended by the viewers. He was considered as the informal leader of the cast members in season 3. He was known for his distinct laugh, often heard in the background during humorous moments. He is often praised for his variety show prowess despite being a famous actor. He was showcased as being a model father and husband, at times being referred to as "수찬이 아빠" ("Su-chan's dad). His three children (Su-chan, Tae-eun, Soo-jin) even joined in on two separate trips. |
| Joo Won | Joo Won was one of the new four members and the youngest of season 2. |
| Sung Si-kyung | Sung Si-kyung was one of the new four members of season 2. |
| Yoo Hae-jin | Yoo Hae-jin was the member who replaced Kim Seung-woo in March 2013. |
| Kim Joo-hyuk | Kim Joo-hyuk was one of the four new members of season 3. He left the show in December 2015, as he was getting more and more role offers and subsequently had a busy schedule. Still, he briefly appeared in many episodes after his departure. On October 30, 2017, Kim Joo-hyuk died due to a vehicular accident. The show later aired a special episode on November 5, 2017, as a tribute to his memory, despite the show's broadcast hiatus due to the labor union's strike. |
| Jung Joon-young | Jung Joon-young was one of the new members and the youngest of season 3. He was a contestant of Superstar K4. He usually took a lot of pictures of the food and set of the show to be put up on his blog. He temporarily left the show in October 2016 due to a scandal with an ex-girlfriend, but returned after almost 4 months. On March 11, 2019, in the midst of a huge scandal concerning non-consensual filming during sex and covert distribution of said illegal videos (which sprung off in the midst of an earlier ongoing scandal that erupted in January 2019 concerning former Big Bang member Seungri and his Gangnam club Burning Sun), Jung Joon-young was identified as an active participant due to leaked KakaoTalk chatroom messages of which he was part of (speculation is also rife in connection to his earlier October 2016 scandal with an ex-girlfriend). A day later (March 12), the show's production team decided to permanently remove Jung Joon-young as a cast member, with KBS subsequently banning him from all of the station's programming. |
| Kim Jun-ho | Kim Jun-ho was one of the four new members of season 3. The oldest member of season 3. He brought much of the humor to the show's third season as a comedian, especially with Jong-min in their banter. Very much as the oldest member, he was lazy and often complained a lot about having to do a lot of work. Considered quite unlucky, often missing out on meals and having to secretly steal food. Notably, he has had to jump into the water for the show's new year episodes on multiple occasions. He would often strip randomly and be teased by the other members for his yellow teeth and bad breath. |
| Defconn | Defconn was one of the four new members of season 3. Known for being the show's best eater and, due to his large build, the strongest member. He excelled in strength dependent games, often reigning king. He has been nicknamed "concerned pig" for, as the nickname suggests, having concerns and worries about too many things. He was often teased by the members for being chaste and not having any dating experience. He was shown to be very kind and considerate towards the other members. |
| Yoon Shi-yoon | Yoon Shi-yoon was the newest member of season 3; he joined the show as a replacement for Kim Joo-hyuk in the 207th trip. Despite his handsome looks, athletic abilities, and determination, he often loses games, giving him the nickname "삑구" ("Bbik gu"). He is particularly known for being bad at playing table tennis. While not technically the youngest member of the third season, he was very much like the show's youngest member with his optimism and admiration for the older members, particularly Jun-ho. |
| Kim Seon-ho | Kim Seon-ho was one of the five new members of the fourth season, and at the same time, the member with the least variety experience at the beginning of season 4. Although he was relatively unknown to the public compared to the other members when he joined the show, he became one of the most loved members after appearing. His lack of experience brought a fresh new character to the show and he gained the nickname, "예뽀" (short for "예능 뽀시래기") aka "Variety Rookie". After Yeon Jung-hoon, he had the best record among the cast members of season 4. He left the show on October 20, 2021 after a controversy surrounding his relationship with an ex-girlfriend. He was edited out of the remaining episodes that were shot prior to the controversy. |
| Ravi | Ravi is a rapper, record producer and member of the boy group VIXX. He was one of the five new members and the youngest member at the beginning of the fourth season. Although he looked dependable and skillful, he often lost games and acted clumsy in crucial moments. His nickname "도라비" ("doravi" aka Crazy Ravi) was given due to the often mischievous actions he made in random situations. He departed from the show to focus on his singing career ahead of his mandatory military service. His last episode aired on May 1, 2022 and he released a single titled "Who We Are" (Korean: 안녕; RR: Annyeong; lit. 'Goodbye') on the same day, as a farewell song. |
| Yeon Jung-hoon | Yeon Jung-hoon is an actor. He was the oldest member of the fourth season. He was known for being passionate and determined when playing games, thus getting the nickname of "열정훈" ("Yeol Jeong-hoon" aka Passion Jeong-hoon, a wordplay combination of 열정 & 정훈). He also has the best winning record among the members when it was announced in one episode. He departed from the show to focus on his acting career. His last episode aired on July 21, 2024. |
| Na In-woo | Na In-woo is an actor, most known for his role in the television series Marry My Husband. He replaced Ravi as the youngest member (maknae) of the fourth season after joining the cast in February 2022. Initially described as a "handsome Kim Jong-min" (hence the eventual nicknames "라이징 바보" (aka Rising fool) & "용바" (acronym of "용감한 바보" aka Brave fool), but "much crazier than Crazy Ravi", he is often teased due to his seemingly never-ending positive energy (hence the nicknames "인우자이저" (aka In-woo-gizer) & "나트리버" (aka Na-triever)) and tall height. Although he is clumsy and clingy, he is later revealed to be quite good at games. He is sometimes referred to as "Manager Yoo", the name of his character from Marry My Husband. He departed from the show to focus on his acting career ahead of his mandatory military service. His last episode aired on July 21, 2024. |
| Jo Se-ho | Jo Se-ho is a comedian and host. He is the best known for appearing as one of the hosts of You Quiz on the Block. He joined as a new regular member in August 2024. He departed from the show due to allegations of being involved with organized crime. His last episode aired on December 28. 2025. |
| Yoo Seon-ho | Yoo Seon-ho is a singer, actor, and model, best known as a contestant on the survival reality show Produce 101 season 2 and the drama Under the Queen's Umbrella. He joined as a new regular member in December 2022. He left the show after 3 years and a half in order to focus on his acting career. His last episode aired on May 31, 2026. |

== Criticism of Season 1 ==
=== Concept ===
During the early days of 1 Night 2 Days, the show was heavily compared with SBS's Good Sunday's Family Outing and MBC's Infinite Challenge, particularly because Noh Hong-chul was part of both 1 Night 2 Days and Infinite Challenge (which aired on Sundays and Saturdays, respectively). However, the concept of the three shows is different. The concept of 1 Night 2 Days is traveling on a trip with families and friends, while Infinite Challenge is a challenge-based variety program with 7 men competing in games.

=== Smoking and profanity ===
The episode which aired on July 6, 2008 gained a lot of criticism from viewers because of a smoking scene. On their trip to Baekdusan, Korea, a scene of MC Mong smoking in the bus was not edited and was aired. In 2004, all 3 major broadcasting stations, KBS, MBC and SBS, agreed to prohibit smoking scenes being aired before midnight. The variety program's directors made an official apology on July 7 for not properly editing the scene before airing the program and it will never occur again.

Viewers protested about the "violent scene" on episode 51, which aired July 20, 2008. The scene was a hidden prank of Kang Ho-dong and Kim C getting into an argument to fool the new director who had joined the show. The production team stated that the fight was not intentional and it left good memories.

On the episode aired September 21, 2008, scenes of Lee Soo-geun smoking in the village were caught on tape and aired. On the episode aired December 7, 2008, more drinking and smoking scenes appeared. It was deemed unsuitable for families watching the show with their children. In the March 15, 2009 episode, it was said that Kang Ho-dong had uttered the profanity "XX-bitch" in one of the scenes. But the production team denied that Kang Ho-dong had said such a thing on the show and that it was just noises during the car ride.

=== Antarctic trip ===
It was announced that on March 9, 2010, the cast and crew of 1 Night 2 Days will take a trip to Antarctica to visit the King Sejong Station. Viewers' opinions were mixed, with some thinking it will be a great experience while others think they should not go. Nonetheless, the production team still had plans to leave on March 9 for the beginning of filming. A small group of the production team even left in February for Chile to prepare for the trip, but they had no choice but to leave and return to Korea after staying in Chile for a week. The reason was due to a blizzard that prevented them from taking a flight to Antarctica from Chile. The production crew had bought brand new HD cameras, lighting equipment and microphones to film the beauty of Antarctica and bring the best resolution to viewers. However, due to the 2010 Chile earthquake on February 27, the production crew had to search for alternate routes to get to Antarctica. Unfortunately, it was announced that the crew had decided to cancel their trip.

== Media response and reception ==
On December 27, 2008 at the 2008 KBS Entertainment Awards, all six cast members were present at the award show and performed "No Matter What" by Park Sang-chul. The show took home five awards – Best Newcomer (Variety), Best Variety Show Writer, Top Popularity Award, Viewer's Choice Program, and the Grand Prize (Daesang). In the Top Popularity Award category, three out of the four nominees were from 1 Night 2 Days – Eun Jiwon, MC Mong, and Lee Seung-gi, for which Lee won the award. The Viewer's Choice Program was based on viewer's votes through surveys and SMS. Happy Sunday ended up with 108.3% of the votes, and trailing behind them with 40.3% of the votes was Happy Together (Gag Concert with 33.1% of votes, A Chat with Beauties with 12.9% of the votes and Sang Sang Plus with 5.3% of the votes).

2 Days & 1 Night's third season received much positive response. The first episode of 1 Night 2 Days received very high viewer ratings of 14.3% when it first aired in December 2013. At the end of 2014, Happy Sunday segments (1 Night 2 Days and The Return of Superman) wrapped up with ratings of 17.9%, followed by SBS Good Sunday (K-pop Star 4 and Running Man) with 12.1% and MBC Sunday Night (7.8%) with Real Men and Dad, Where Are You Going? In March 2015, KBS's Happy Sunday was in first place in terms of viewer ratings with 14.7%, beating out SBS's Good Sunday (Running Man and Take Care of My Dad) with 11.1% and MBC's Sunday Night (Animals and Real Man) with 8.4%.

== Digital single ==
A digital single of the show's theme song was released on March 29, 2010 and was first heard on episode 135, which was aired March 28, 2010. The title of the song is called "Let's Go Paradise" and is sung by Gil Hak-mi (a contestant on Mnet's talent show Superstar K 1) and Han Bora (from AB Avenue).

On the episodes 486-488 which were aired March 5, 12, and 19, 2017, Season 3 members had been given a mission to make an OST for their 10th Anniversary. With the help of several musicians, they succeeded the mission. Producing 3 songs, namely "Remember Each Member", "Day Off", and "Kkanaricano".

== In popular culture ==
The 2015 KBS2 television series The Producers, written by Park Ji-eun and directed by Seo Soo-min, which depicts the lives of the employees of the KBS variety department, is centered around the (fictional) production staff of 2 Days & 1 Night. Unlike the original program, however, the 2 Days & 1 Night depicted in the drama had both male and female cast members and was already in its fifth season. Cha Tae-hyun, who was then a cast member of the original program, played the role of main PD of 2 Days & 1 Night in the drama, while Kim Soo-hyun played a rookie PD and Lee Ji-eun (IU) played a cast member of the show. Several celebrities also made cameo appearances in the drama as (fictional) cast members from various seasons of the show, including Youn Yuh-jung, Geum Bo-ra, Hwang Shin-hye, Hyun Young, You Hee-yeol, Jun Hyun-moo, Yoon Jong-shin, Sandara Park, Kang Seung-yoon, Minwoo, Kim Min-jae, and Jisoo. In 2022, an idol spin-off version was made titled Idol 1N2D.

== Awards and recognitions ==
Being a successful long-running program, 2 Days & 1 Night has won numerous awards at various award ceremonies. At KBS Entertainment Awards, cast members of 2 Days & 1 Night won the Grand Prize in 2008, 2009, 2011, 2016 & 2021 and the show became Viewers' Choice Best Program in 2015, 2016, 2018, 2020 & 2021. In 2008, Kang Ho-dong - cast member of Season 1 received Grand Prize -Television at 44th Baeksang Arts Awards becoming the first comedian to win the award. In 2018, the show received a Presidential Commendation from the South Korean Ministry of Culture, Sports and Tourism for the show's effort of promoting tourism since 2007.

=== Other accolades ===
| Organization | Year | Honor | Ref |
|---|---|---|---|
| Ministry of Culture, Sports and Tourism | 2010 | Appreciation Plaque | |
| Ministry of Culture, Sports and Tourism | 2010 | Korea Tourism Star – Merit | |
| Ministry of Culture, Sports and Tourism | 2018 | Presidential Commendation | |

== International versions ==
- China: 2 Days & 1 Night (Chinese TV series), Sichuan TV (SS1) - Dragon TV (SS2)
- Vietnam: 2 ngày 1 đêm, HTV7

== See also ==
- List of 2 Days & 1 Night episodes
- KBS2 Happy Sunday
- 2 Days & 1 Night (Chinese TV series)

Awards and achievements
| Preceded by Happy Sunday | Korea Entertainment Art Awards; 2008 | Succeeded by Quiz to Change the World |
| Preceded by Happy Sunday | KBS Entertainment Awards for Best Program Award; 2010 | Succeeded by n/a |
