= Ji Sang-ryeol =

South Korean comedian (born 1970)

Ji Sang-ryeol 지상렬 池相烈
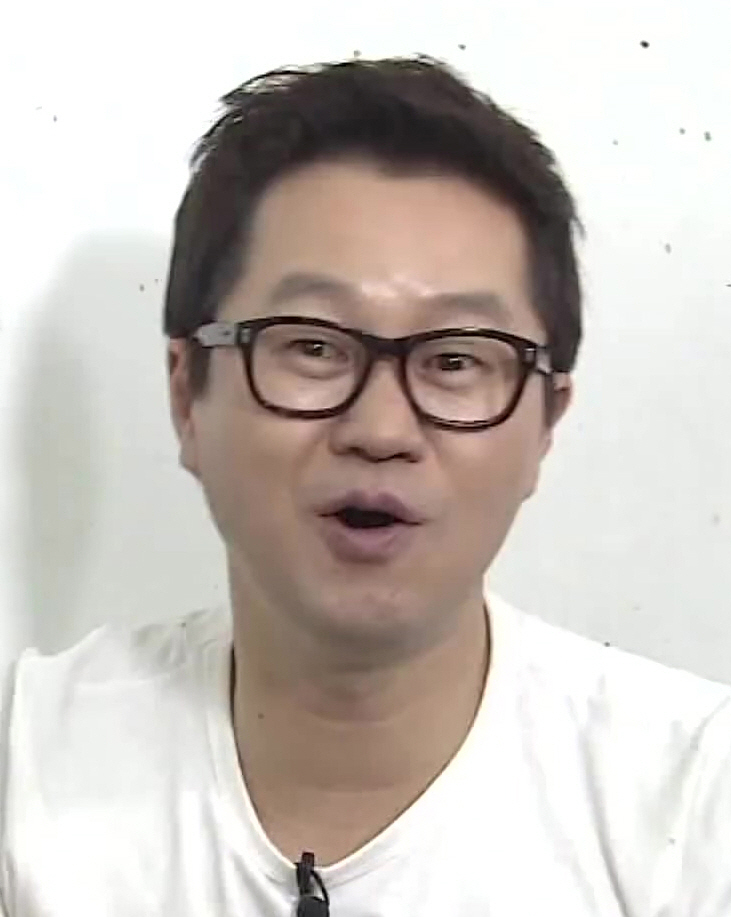
- Born: Ji Sang-ryeol; December 26, 1970 (age 55); Michuhol-gu, Incheon, South Korea
- Occupations: Actor; television presenter; comedian
- Years active: 1996–present

Ji Sang-ryeol (born December 26, 1970) is a South Korean actor, comedian, and host. Ji has made numerous appearances in dramas and TV Shows. He is well known for his blunt yet humorous personality in TV Shows such as X-Man and being of the main MCs of top Korean variety show 2 Days & 1 Night until a sudden withdrawal and replaced by Kim C. In 2010 Ji was one of the main MCs of Family Outing 2 along with female comedian Shin Bong-sun.

== Filmography ==
=== TV dramas ===
- Lee San, Wind of the Palace (MBC, 2007)
- Common Single (SBS, 2006)
- A Love to Kill (KBS2, 2005)
- Bad Housewife (SBS, 2005)
- Banjun Drama (SBS, 2004)
- Match Made in Heaven (MBC, 2004)
- Jewel in the Palace (MBC, 2003)
- The Bean Chaff of My Life (MBC, 2003)
- My Platoon Leader (MBC, 2002)

=== Variety shows and comedy ===
- X-Man
- 2 Days & 1 Night
- Family Outing 2
- Rainbow Kids
- Law of the Jungle in Sumatra
- Living Together in Empty Room
- The Fishermen and the City (Season 2)
- King of Mask Singer
- Good.R.Sam MBC Drama Net

=== Television shows ===
Year	Title	Role	Notes	Ref.
2021	The Village Lover	Cast Member		
2021	Battle in the Box	Host	with Lee Hwi-jae	
2022	Healing Spot Cam City	Main Host		
2023	Hell Court	Regular Member		

=== Radio shows ===
Year	Title	Role	Notes	Ref.
2022–present	When It's Hot, Sang-ryeol	DJ	July 18, 2022–present	

=== Web shows ===
Year	Title	Role	Notes	Ref.
2022	Bone Striking Masters	Host	with Lee Sang-wook	

== Education ==
- Korea National Open University
